= 2017–18 Georgia Tech Yellow Jackets women's basketball team =

Intercollegiate basketball season

2017–18 Georgia Tech Yellow Jackets women's basketball

WNIT, Third Round
- Conference: Atlantic Coast Conference
- Record: 20–14 (6–10 ACC)
- Head coach: MaChelle Joseph (15th season)
- Assistant coaches: Kevin Morrison; Rob Norris; Jonneshia Pineda
- Home arena: Hank McCamish Pavilion

2017–18 ACC women's basketball standings
	Conf.				Overall
Team	W		L	PCT	W		L	PCT
No. 3 Louisville *†	15	–	1	.938	36	–	3	.923
No. 5 Notre Dame	15	–	1	.938	35	–	3	.921
No. 11 Florida State	12	–	4	.750	26	–	7	.788
No. 21 NC State	11	–	5	.688	26	–	9	.743
No. 20 Duke	11	–	5	.688	24	–	9	.727
Syracuse	10	–	6	.625	22	–	9	.710
Miami (FL)	10	–	6	.625	21	–	11	.656
Virginia	10	–	6	.625	19	–	14	.576
Virginia Tech	6	–	10	.375	23	–	14	.622
Georgia Tech	6	–	10	.375	20	–	14	.588
Wake Forest	5	–	11	.313	14	–	17	.452
North Carolina	4	–	12	.250	15	–	16	.484
Pittsburgh	2	–	14	.125	10	–	20	.333
Boston College	2	–	14	.125	7	–	23	.233
Clemson	1	–	15	.063	11	–	19	.367
† 2018 ACC tournament winner * Tournament #1 seed As of 31 March 2018; Rankings from AP poll

The 2017–18 Georgia Tech Yellow Jackets women's basketball team represented Georgia Institute of Technology during the 2017-18 NCAA Division I women's basketball season. Returning as head coach was MaChelle Joseph in her 15th season. The team played its home games at Hank McCamish Pavilion in Atlanta, Georgia as members of the Atlantic Coast Conference.

They finished the season 20–14, 6–10 in ACC play to finish in ninth place. They advanced to the second round of the ACC women's tournament where they lost to Virginia. They were invited to the Women's National Invitation Tournament and advanced to the third round, where they lost to Alabama.

== Previous season ==
They finished the 2016–17 season 22–15, 5–11 in ACC play to finish in tenth place. They advanced to the second round of the ACC women's tournament where they lost to Miami (FL). They were invited to the Women's National Invitation Tournament where they advanced to the championship game where they lost to Michigan.

== 2017–18 media ==
All Yellow Jackets games will air on the Yellow Jackets IMG Sports Network. WREK once again serves as the home of the Ramblin Wreck women's basketball team.

== Roster ==
2017–18 Georgia Tech Yellow Jackets women's basketball team
Players
Coaches

Pos.	#	Name	Height	Year	Previous school	Hometown
G	0	Imani Tilford	5 ft 5 in (1.65 m)	Sr	Woodlands	Greenburgh, NY
G	1	Kaylan Pugh	5 ft 9 in (1.75 m)	Jr	St. Mary's Episcopal; Ohio State	Collierville, TN
G	3	Taja Cummings	5 ft 6 in (1.68 m)	Fr	St. Francis	Alpharetta, GA
F	4	Anne Francoise Diouf	6 ft 4 in (1.93 m)	Jr	IMG Academy	Dakar, Senegal
F	5	Daijah Jefferson	6 ft 2 in (1.88 m)	Fr	Hopewell	Hopewell, VA
F	11	Elo Edeferioka	6 ft 2 in (1.88 m)	RS Sr	Life Center Academy	Warri, Nigeria
F	12	Breanna Brown	6 ft 3 in (1.91 m)	GS	Bishop O'Dowd; Oregon State	Oakland, CA
G	13	Lorela Cubaj	6 ft 4 in (1.93 m)	Fr	Istituto Paritario G. Parini	Terni, Italy
F	21	Zaire O'Neil	5 ft 11 in (1.8 m)	Sr	Malcolm X Shabazz	Newark, NJ
G	24	Chanin Scott	6 ft 0 in (1.83 m)	So	Meyers Park	Charlotte, NC
G	33	Francesca Pan	6 ft 1 in (1.85 m)	So	None	Bassano del Grappa, Italy
G	41	Kierra Fletcher	5 ft 9 in (1.75 m)	Fr	Warren Cousino	Warren, MI
F	44	Martine Fortune	6 ft 3 in (1.91 m)	Jr	The Shipley School	Philadelphia, PA
G	55	Antonia Peresson	5 ft 9 in (1.75 m)	Sr	Liceo Stefanini Yenezia	Pordenone, Italy

Head coach

- MaChelle Joseph (Purdue)

Assistant coach(es)

- Kevin Morrison (Cal Poly)
- Rob Norris (Indiana (PA))
- Jonneshia Pineda (Georgia Southwestern State)

Legend

- (C) Team captain
- (S) Suspended
- (I) Ineligible
- (W) Walk-on
- Injured
- Current redshirt

Roster

== Schedule ==
Date time, TV	Rank^{#}	Opponent^{#}	Result	Record	Site (attendance) city, state
Non-conference regular season
11/10/2017*; 7:00 pm, ESPN3		at Appalachian State	W 75-41	1–0	Holmes Center (750); Boone, NC
11/12/2017*; 2:00 pm, ACCN Extra		South Carolina State	W 86–40	2–0	Hank McCamish Pavilion (896); Atlanta, GA
11/15/2017*; 7:00 pm, ACCN Extra		Kennesaw State	W 86–48	3–0	Hank McCamish Pavilion (904); Atlanta, GA
11/19/2017*; 1:00 pm, ESPN3		at Princeton	W 67–56	4–0	Jadwin Gymnasium (852); Princeton, NJ
11/21/2017*; 11:00 am, ACCN Extra		Georgia State	W 75–51	5–0	Hank McCamish Pavilion (1,024); Atlanta, GA
11/23/2017*; 5:15 pm		vs. Penn; Junkanoo Jam Junkanoo Division semifinals	W 69–55	6–0	Gateway Christian Academy; Bimini, BAH
11/25/2017*; 2:00 pm		vs. No. 8 Baylor; Junkanoo Jam Junkanoo Division championship	L 57–80	6–1	Gateway Christian Academy; Bimini, BAH
11/30/2017*; 7:00 pm, ACCN Extra		Purdue; ACC–Big Ten Women's Challenge	W 68–55	7–1	Hank McCamish Pavilion (1,201); Atlanta, GA
12/03/2017*; 1:00 pm, ACCN Extra		Middle Tennessee	W 48–45	8–1	Hank McCamish Pavilion (921); Atlanta, GA
12/10/2017*; 2:00 pm, ACCN Extra		Texas–Arlington	W 80–52	9–1	Hank McCamish Pavilion (718); Atlanta, GA
12/17/2017*; 1:00 pm, SECN		at Georgia	L 53–60	9–2	Stegeman Coliseum (4,290); Athens, GA
12/19/2017*; 7:00 pm, ACCN Extra		Charleston Southern	W 78–51	10-2	Hank McCamish Pavilion (807); Atlanta, GA
12/21/2017*; 7:00 pm, ACCN Extra		Southern Miss	W 63–44	11–2	Hank McCamish Pavilion (856); Atlanta, GA
ACC regular season
12/28/2017; 7:00 pm, ACCN Extra		No. 3 Louisville	L 71–74	11–3 (0–1)	Hank McCamish Pavilion (1,473); Atlanta, GA
12/31/2017; 2:00 pm, ACCN Extra		Clemson	W 66–33	12–3 (1-1)	Hank McCamish Pavilion (1,191); Atlanta, GA
01/04/2018; 7:00 pm, ACCN Extra		at Syracuse	L 77–88	12–4 (1–2)	Carrier Dome (1,231); Syracuse, NY
01/07/2018; 2:00 pm, ACCN Extra		No. 2 Notre Dame	L 54–77	12–5 (1–3)	Hank McCamish Pavilion (2,024); Atlanta, GA
01/10/2018; 7:00 pm, ACCN Extra		at NC State	L 43–56	12–6 (1–4)	Reynolds Coliseum (2,421); Raleigh, NC
01/14/2018; 2:00 pm, ACCN Extra		at Pittsburgh	L 62–68	12–7 (1–5)	Petersen Events Center (812); Pittsburgh, PA
01/21/2018; 2:00 pm, ACCN Extra		Wake Forest	W 79–67	13–7 (2–5)	Hank McCamish Pavilion (1,597); Atlanta, GA
01/25/2018; 7:00 pm, ACCN Extra		at Virginia Tech	L 62–68	13–8 (2–6)	Cassell Coliseum (2,179); Blacksburg, VA
01/28/2018; 7:00 pm, ACCN Extra		Virginia	L 56–62	13–9 (2–7)	Hank McCamish Pavilion (1,601); Atlanta, GA
02/01/2018; 7:00 pm, ACCN Extra		at No. 19 Duke	L 59–77	13–10 (2–8)	Cameron Indoor Stadium (3,311); Durham, NC
02/04/2018; 2:00 pm, ACCN Extra		at Clemson	W 60-48	14–10 (3–8)	Littlejohn Coliseum (947); Clemson, SC
02/08/2018; 7:00 pm, ACCN Extra		Boston College	W 67–43	15–10 (4–8)	Hank McCamish Pavilion (1,014); Atlanta, GA
02/11/2018; 7:00 pm, RSN		at No. 5 Notre Dame	L 69–85	15–11 (4–9)	Edmund P. Joyce Center (8,421); Notre Dame, IN
02/15/2018; 7:00 pm, ACCN Extra		North Carolina	W 79–61	16–11 (5–9)	Hank McCamish Pavilion (1,122); Atlanta, GA
02/22/2018; 7:00 pm, RSN		Miami (FL)	W 70–51	17–11 (6–9)	Hank McCamish Pavilion (1,476); Atlanta, GA
02/25/2018; 1:00 pm, RSN		at No. 9 Florida State	L 61–64	17–12 (6–10)	Donald L. Tucker Center (3,357); Tallahassee, FL
ACC Women's Tournament
02/28/2018; 3:30 pm, ACCN Extra	(10)	vs. (15) Clemson; First Round	W 61–52	18–12	Greensboro Coliseum (3,134); Greensboro, NC
03/01/2018; 6:00 pm, ACCN Extra	(10)	vs. (7) Virginia; Second Round	L 58–60	18–13	Greensboro Coliseum; Greensboro, NC
WNIT
03/15/2017*; 7:00 pm, ACCN Extra		Bethune–Cookman; First Round	W 85–32	19–13	Hank McCamish Pavilion (539); Atlanta, GA
03/18/2017*; 2:00 pm, ESPN3		UAB; Second Round	W 91–47	20–13	Hank McCamish Pavilion (681); Atlanta, GA
03/22/2018*; 8:00 pm		at Alabama; Third Round	L 59–61	20–14	Coleman Coliseum (640); Tuscaloosa, AL
*Non-conference game. ^{#}Rankings from AP Poll,. (#) Tournament seedings in parentheses. All times are in Eastern Time.

== Rankings ==
Regular season polls
Poll	Pre- Season	Week 2	Week 3	Week 4	Week 5	Week 6	Week 7	Week 8	Week 9	Week 10	Week 11	Week 12	Week 13	Week 14	Week 15	Week 16	Week 17	Week 18	Week 19	Final
AP	RV	RV	RV						RV											N/A
Coaches	RV	RV	RV		RV	RV	RV	RV	RV	RV										

Legend
	Increase in ranking
	Decrease in ranking
	Not ranked previous week
(RV)	Received Votes

== See also ==
2017-18 Georgia Tech Yellow Jackets men's basketball team
