= 2017–18 Wake Forest Demon Deacons women's basketball team =

Intercollegiate basketball season

2017–18 Wake Forest Demon Deacons women's basketball
- Conference: Atlantic Coast Conference
- Record: 14–17 (5–11 ACC)
- Head coach: Jen Hoover (6th season)
- Assistant coaches: Jermaine Woods; Lisa Cermignano; Dane Sparrow
- Home arena: LJVM Coliseum

2017–18 ACC women's basketball standings
	Conf.				Overall
Team	W		L	PCT	W		L	PCT
No. 3 Louisville *†	15	–	1	.938	36	–	3	.923
No. 5 Notre Dame	15	–	1	.938	35	–	3	.921
No. 11 Florida State	12	–	4	.750	26	–	7	.788
No. 21 NC State	11	–	5	.688	26	–	9	.743
No. 20 Duke	11	–	5	.688	24	–	9	.727
Syracuse	10	–	6	.625	22	–	9	.710
Miami (FL)	10	–	6	.625	21	–	11	.656
Virginia	10	–	6	.625	19	–	14	.576
Virginia Tech	6	–	10	.375	23	–	14	.622
Georgia Tech	6	–	10	.375	20	–	14	.588
Wake Forest	5	–	11	.313	14	–	17	.452
North Carolina	4	–	12	.250	15	–	16	.484
Pittsburgh	2	–	14	.125	10	–	20	.333
Boston College	2	–	14	.125	7	–	23	.233
Clemson	1	–	15	.063	11	–	19	.367
† 2018 ACC tournament winner * Tournament #1 seed As of 31 March 2018; Rankings from AP poll

The 2017–18 Wake Forest Demon Deacons women's basketball team represented Wake Forest University during the 2017–18 NCAA Division I women's basketball season. The Demon Deacons, led by sixth-year head coach Jen Hoover, were members of the Atlantic Coast Conference and played their home games at the Lawrence Joel Veterans Memorial Coliseum. They finished the season 14–17, 5–11 in ACC play to finish in eleventh place. They defeated Pittsburgh in the first round before losing in the second round of the ACC women's tournament to Miami (FL).

== Previous season ==
They finished the season 16–16, 6–10 in ACC play in ninth place. They lost in the second round of the ACC women's tournament to Virginia. They were invited to the Women's National Invitation Tournament, where they defeated Bethune-Cookman in the first round before losing to Middle Tennessee in the second round.

== Media ==
=== Wake Forest IMG Sports Network ===
The Wake Forest Demon Deacons IMG Sports Network broadcast Demon Deacons games on Wake Forest All Access. Information was also posted on Twitter @WakeWBB. Post-game interviews were posted on the school's YouTube channel.

== Roster ==
2017–18 Wake Forest Demon Deacons women's basketball team
Players
Coaches

Pos.	#	Name	Height	Year	Previous school	Hometown
F	0	Maya Banks	6 ft 4 in (1.93 m)	Fr	Hamilton	Chandler, AZ
G/F	1	Destini Walker	6 ft 0 in (1.83 m)	RS So	Hermitage	Ossining, NY
G	2	Amber Campbell	5 ft 9 in (1.75 m)	Sr	Northwood Academy	Charleston, SC
G	5	Gina Conti	5 ft 10 in (1.78 m)	Fr	Grove City	Grove City, OH
F	11	Ivana Raca	6 ft 2 in (1.88 m)	Fr	1st Lyceum of Voula	Belgrade, Serbia
G	14	Alex Sharp	6 ft 1 in (1.85 m)	So	Australian Institute of Sport	Melbourne, Australia
G	15	Kortni Simmons	5 ft 8 in (1.73 m)	RS So	West Florence	Spotsylvania, PA
F	21	Raegyn Branch	6 ft 2 in (1.88 m)	RS Fr	Arlington	Arlington, TX
G	25	Ariel Stephenson	5 ft 10 in (1.78 m)	Jr	Prince George	Prince George, VA
F	41	Elisa Penna	6 ft 3 in (1.91 m)	Jr	ITC F. Foscari	Bergamo, Italy
F	42	Tyra Whitehead	6 ft 3 in (1.91 m)	So	Cosby	Richmond, VA
F	44	Ona Udoh	6 ft 1 in (1.85 m)	So	Terry Sanford	Fayetteville, NC

Head coach

- Jen Hoover (Wake Forest)

Assistant coach(es)

- Jermaine Woods (Christopher Newport)
- Lisa Cermignano (George Washington)
- Dane Sparrow (UNC Greensboro)

Legend

- (C) Team captain
- (S) Suspended
- (I) Ineligible
- (W) Walk-on
- Injured
- Current redshirt

Roster
Last update: February 25, 2018

== Schedule ==
Date time, TV	Rank^{#}	Opponent^{#}	Result	Record	Site (attendance) city, state
Non-conference regular season
November 10, 2017*; 4:00 pm		Texas Southern	W 73–56	1–0	LJVM Coliseum (583); Winston–Salem, NC
November 12, 2017*; 2:00 pm		Seton Hall	L 57–67	1–1	LJVM Coliseum (497); Winston–Salem, NC
November 15, 2017*; 7:00 pm		at Richmond	W 85–81	2–1	Robins Center (775); Richmond, VA
November 19, 2017*; 6:30 pm		at Rutgers	L 51–65	2–2	Louis Brown Athletic Center (1,535); Piscataway, NJ
November 25, 2017*; 5:30 pm		vs. Minnesota; Lady Rebel Round-up semifinals	L 81–93	2–3	Cox Pavilion (583); Las Vegas, NV
November 26, 2017*; 3:00 pm		vs. Hofstra; Lady Rebel Round-up 3rd place game	L 66–69	2–4	Cox Pavilion; Las Vegas, NV
November 30, 2017*; 7:00 pm		at Penn State; ACC–Big Ten Women's Challenge	L 58–68	2–5	Bryce Jordan Center (2,329); University Park, PA
December 2, 2017*; 12:00 pm		Elon	W 53–51	3–5	LJVM Coliseum (411); Winston–Salem, NC
December 4, 2017*; 7:00 pm		at Xavier	W 62–57	4–5	Cintas Center (656); Cincinnati, OH
December 7, 2017*; 7:00 pm		Appalachian State	W 78–49	5–5	LJVM Coliseum (509); Winston–Salem, NC
December 9, 2017*; 5:00 pm		Maryland Eastern Shore	W 90–50	6–5	LJVM Coliseum (317); Winston–Salem, NC
December 18, 2017*; 11:00 am		Charlotte	W 71–69	7–5	LJVM Coliseum (10,011); Winston–Salem, NC
December 21, 2017*; 12:00 pm		at College of Charleston	W 77–40	8–5	TD Arena (414); Charleston, SC
ACC regular season
December 31, 2017; 1:00 pm, ACCN Extra		No. 2 Notre Dame	L 73–96	8–6 (0–1)	LJVM Coliseum (731); Winston–Salem, NC
January 4, 2018; 7:00 pm, ACCN Extra		at Pittsburgh	W 58–49	9–6 (1–1)	Peterson Events Center (463); Pittsburgh, PA
January 7, 2018; 7:00 pm, ACCN Extra		at Miami (FL)	W 61–50	10–6 (2–1)	Watsco Center (1,138); Coral Gables, FL
January 11, 2018; 7:00 pm, ACCN Extra		No. 16 Duke	L 67–80	10–7 (2–2)	LJVM Coliseum (557); Winston–Salem, NC
January 14, 2018; 12:30 pm, RSN		North Carolina	L 76–79 ^{OT}	10–8 (2–3)	LJVM Coliseum (937); Winston–Salem, NC
January 18, 2018; 7:00 pm, ACCN Extra		No. 12 Florida State	L 79–81 ^{OT}	10–9 (2–4)	LJVM Coliseum (329); Winston–Salem, NC
January 21, 2018; 2:00 pm, ACCN Extra		at Georgia Tech	L 67–79	10–10 (2–5)	McCamish Pavilion (1,597); Atlanta, GA
January 25, 2018; 7:00 pm, RSN		NC State	L 68–82	10–11 (2–6)	LJVM Coliseum (517); Winston–Salem, NC
January 28, 2018; 1:00 pm, RSN		at Louisville	L 52–89	10–12 (2–7)	KFC Yum! Center (10,139); Louisville, KY
February 1, 2018; 7:00 pm, ACCN Extra		at Boston College	W 67–59	11–12 (3–7)	Conte Forum (1,027); Chestnut Hill, MA
February 7, 2018; 7:00 pm, ACCN Extra		at No. 19 Duke	L 51–59	11–13 (3–8)	Cameron Indoor Stadium (3,243); Durham, NC
February 11, 2018; 2:00 pm, ACCN Extra		Syracuse	L 61–71	11–14 (3–9)	LJVM Coliseum (1,097); Winston–Salem, NC
February 15, 2018; 2:00 pm, ACCN Extra		Virginia Tech	W 73–56	12–14 (4–9)	LJVM Coliseum (485); Winston–Salem, NC
February 18, 2018; 12:00 pm, ESPNU		at No. 25 NC State	L 61–74	12–15 (4–10)	Reynolds Coliseum (4,501); Raleigh, NC
February 22, 2018; 7:00 pm, ACCN Extra		at Clemson	W 61–55	13–15 (5–10)	Littlejohn Coliseum (709); Clemson, SC
February 25, 2018; 3:00 pm, RSN		Virginia	L 41–48	13–16 (5–11)	LJVM Coliseum (786); Winston–Salem, NC
ACC Women's Tournament
February 28, 2018; 6:30 pm, ACCN Extra	(11)	vs. (14) Pittsburgh; First Round	W 72–38	14–16	Greensboro Coliseum (2,810); Greensboro, NC
March 1, 2018; 8:00 pm, ACCN Extra	(11)	vs. (6) Miami (FL); Second Round	L 60–68	14–17	Greensboro Coliseum (4,008); Greensboro, NC
*Non-conference game. ^{#}Rankings from AP Poll. (#) Tournament seedings in parentheses. All times are in Eastern.

== See also ==
- 2017–18 Wake Forest Demon Deacons men's basketball team
