= 2017–18 Duke Blue Devils women's basketball team =

Intercollegiate basketball season

2017–18 Duke Blue Devils women's basketball

NCAA tournament, Sweet Sixteen
- Conference: Atlantic Coast Conference

Ranking
- Coaches: No. 12
- AP: No. 20
- Record: 24–9 (11–5 ACC)
- Head coach: Joanne P. McCallie (11th season)
- Assistant coaches: Sam Miller; Rene Haynes; Hernando Planells
- Home arena: Cameron Indoor Stadium

2017–18 ACC women's basketball standings
	Conf.				Overall
Team	W		L	PCT	W		L	PCT
No. 3 Louisville *†	15	–	1	.938	36	–	3	.923
No. 5 Notre Dame	15	–	1	.938	35	–	3	.921
No. 11 Florida State	12	–	4	.750	26	–	7	.788
No. 21 NC State	11	–	5	.688	26	–	9	.743
No. 20 Duke	11	–	5	.688	24	–	9	.727
Syracuse	10	–	6	.625	22	–	9	.710
Miami (FL)	10	–	6	.625	21	–	11	.656
Virginia	10	–	6	.625	19	–	14	.576
Virginia Tech	6	–	10	.375	23	–	14	.622
Georgia Tech	6	–	10	.375	20	–	14	.588
Wake Forest	5	–	11	.313	14	–	17	.452
North Carolina	4	–	12	.250	15	–	16	.484
Pittsburgh	2	–	14	.125	10	–	20	.333
Boston College	2	–	14	.125	7	–	23	.233
Clemson	1	–	15	.063	11	–	19	.367
† 2018 ACC tournament winner * Tournament #1 seed As of 31 March 2018; Rankings from AP poll

The 2017–18 Duke Blue Devils women's basketball team represented Duke University during the 2017–18 NCAA Division I women's basketball season. Their head coach was Joanne P. McCallie in her 11th season at Duke. The Blue Devils played theirs home games at Cameron Indoor Stadium in Durham, North Carolina as members of the Atlantic Coast Conference. They finished the season 24–9, 11–5 in ACC play to finish in a tie for fourth place. They lost in the quarterfinals of the ACC women's tournament to NC State. They received an at-large bid to the NCAA women's tournament, where they defeated Belmont and Georgia before losing to Connecticut in the Sweet Sixteen.

== Roster ==
2017–18 Duke Blue Devils women's basketball team
Players
Coaches

Pos.	#	Name	Height	Year	Previous school	Hometown
G	2	Haley Gorecki	6 ft 0 in (1.83 m)	RS So	William Fremd	Palatine, IL
G	4	Lexie Brown	5 ft 9 in (1.75 m)	RS Sr	North Gwinnett; Maryland	Suwanee, GA
F	5	Leaonna Odom	6 ft 2 in (1.88 m)	So	Chaminade	Lompoc, CA
C	11	Sofía Roma	6 ft 2 in (1.88 m)	RS Jr	Nazareth Regional; Wagner	Richmond Hill, NY
G/F	14	Faith Suggs	6 ft 1 in (1.85 m)	Jr	Homewood Flossmoor	Flossmoor, IL
G	15	Kyra Lambert	5 ft 9 in (1.75 m)	Jr	Samuel Clemens	Cibolo, TX
C	21	Bego Faz Davalos	6 ft 3 in (1.91 m)	RS Sr	Technologico De Monterrey	San Luis Potosí, Mexico
G	23	Rebecca Greenwell	6 ft 1 in (1.85 m)	RS Sr	The Colony	The Colony, TX
F/C	25	Jade Williams	6 ft 5 in (1.96 m)	Fr	Owensboro Catholic	Owensboro, KY
C	30	Emily Schubert	6 ft 4 in (1.93 m)	RS Fr	Elizabethton	Elizabethton, TN
G	32	Jayda Adams	6 ft 4 in (1.93 m)	Fr	Mater Dei	Irvine, CA
F/C	35	Erin Mathias	6 ft 4 in (1.93 m)	Sr	Fox Chapel Area	Pittsburgh, PA
F/C	44	Madison Treece	6 ft 4 in (1.93 m)	Fr	Rock Bridge	St. Peters, MO

Head coach

- Joanne P. McCallie (Northwestern)

Assistant coach(es)

- Hernando Planells (Regis)
- Rene Haynes (Michigan State)
- Sam Miller (Adrian)

Legend

- (C) Team captain
- (S) Suspended
- (I) Ineligible
- (W) Walk-on
- Injured
- Current redshirt

Roster
Last update: February 15, 2018

== Rankings ==
Regular season polls
Poll	Pre- season	Week 2	Week 3	Week 4	Week 5	Week 6	Week 7	Week 8	Week 9	Week 10	Week 11	Week 12	Week 13	Week 14	Week 15	Week 16	Week 17	Week 18	Week 19	Final
AP	12	11	16	14	14	14	14	14	17	16	15	18	19	19	17	20	18	20	20	N/A
Coaches	12	N/A	17	16	14	14	15	15	18	18	15	18	19	19	16	16	15	18	18	12

Legend
	Increase in ranking
	Decrease in ranking
	No change
(RV)	Received votes
(NR)	Not ranked

== Schedule and results ==
Date time, TV	Rank^{#}	Opponent^{#}	Result	Record	High points	High rebounds	High assists	Site (attendance) city, state
Exhibition
November 5, 2017*; 6:00 pm	No. 12	Alaska Anchorage	W 87–56		27 – Brown	8 – Odom	6 – Greenwell	Cameron Indoor Stadium; Durham, NC
Non-conference regular season
November 12, 2017*; 5:00 pm, ESPN3	No. 12	at Grand Canyon	W 74–61	1–0	19 – Greenwell	9 – Mathias	6 – Brown	GCU Arena (1,683); Phoenix, AZ
November 16, 2017*; 2:00 pm, ACCN Extra	No. 11	High Point	W 77–50	2–0	24 – Brown	9 – Odom	7 – Boykin	Cameron Indoor Stadium (2,063); Durham, NC
November 19, 2017*; 1:00 pm	No. 11	at Villanova	L 55–64	2–1	16 – Brown	12 – Odom	2 – tied	Jake Nevin Field House (1,421); Villanova, PA
November 22, 2017*; 7:00 pm, ESPN3	No. 16	at Old Dominion	W 84–51	3–1	28 – Brown	9 – Greenwell	8 – Brown	Ted Constant Convocation Center (1,960); Norfolk, VA
November 25, 2017*; 3:00 pm, ACCN Extra	No. 16	No. 18 Oregon State	W 72–65	4–1	19 – Brown	9 – Greenwell	5 – Brown	Cameron Indoor Stadium (3,408); Durham, NC
November 26, 2017*; 2:00 pm, ACCN Extra	No. 16	Presbyterian	W 79–45	5–1	22 – Greenwell	10 – Odom	7 – Brown	Cameron Indoor Stadium (3,266); Durham, NC
November 30, 2017*; 7:00 pm, ESPN2	No. 14	No. 8 Ohio State; ACC–Big Ten Women's Challenge	W 69–60	6–1	19 – tied	13 – Odom	4 – tied	Cameron Indoor Stadium (3,408); Durham, NC
December 3, 2017*; 12:00 pm, SECN	No. 14	at No. 5 South Carolina	L 52–72	6–2	16 – Mathias	6 – tied	4 – tied	Colonial Life Arena (13,054); Columbia, SC
December 10, 2017*; 2:00 pm, ACCN Extra	No. 14	Winthrop	W 101–30	8–2	30 – Brown	7 – tied	6 – Brown	Cameron Indoor Stadium (3,332); Durham, NC
December 19, 2017*; 7:00 pm, ACCN Extra	No. 14	Maine	W 69–39	9–2	26 – Brown	11 – Odom	6 – Odom	Cameron Indoor Stadium (3,053); Durham, NC
December 21, 2017*; 7:00 pm, ACCN Extra	No. 14	Wyoming	W 63–40	10–2	23 – Brown	9 – Gorecki	3 – tied	Cameron Indoor Stadium (3,156); Durham, NC
December 29, 2017*; 7:00 pm, ACCN Extra	No. 14	Liberty	W 65–51	11–2	26 – Brown	7 – 4 tied	4 – Gorecki	Cameron Indoor Stadium (3,531); Durham, NC
ACC regular season
December 31, 2017; 12:30 pm, ACCN Extra	No. 14	at Miami (FL)	L 48–51	11–3 (0–1)	16 – Gorecki	7 – tied	3 – Gorecki	Watsco Center (878); Coral Gables, FL
January 4, 2018; 7:00 pm, ACCN Extra	No. 17	at No. 3 Louisville	L 60–66	11–4 (0–2)	25 – Gorecki	9 – Brown	6 – Gorecki	KFC Yum! Center (8,101); Louisville, KY
January 7, 2018; 3:00 pm, ACCN Extra	No. 17	NC State	W 69–56	12–4 (1–2)	34 – Brown	8 – Brown	6 – Gorecki	Cameron Indoor Stadium (4,531); Durham, NC
January 11, 2018; 7:00 pm, ACCN Extra	No. 16	at Wake Forest	W 80–67	13–4 (2–2)	27 – Brown	8 – Greenwell	7 – Gorecki	LJVM Coliseum (557); Winston–Salem, NC
January 14, 2018; 3:00 pm, ESPN2	No. 16	Virginia	W 55–48	14–4 (3–2)	14 – Brown	9 – Odom	4 – Brown	Cameron Indoor Stadium (3,856); Durham, NC
January 18, 2018; 7:00 pm, ACCN Extra	No. 15	at Virginia Tech	W 86–75	15–4 (4–2)	28 – Gorecki	6 – tied	5 – Brown	Cassell Coliseum (2,365); Blacksburg, VA
January 21, 2018; 7:00 pm, RSN	No. 15	at North Carolina; Rivalry	L 86–92 ^{OT}	15–5 (4–3)	29 – Gorecki	10 – Brown	6 – tied	Carmichael Arena (4,634); Chapel Hill, NC
January 25, 2018; 7:00 pm, ACCN Extra	No. 18	Boston College	W 75–50	16–5 (5–3)	19 – tied	8 – Odom	4 – Odom	Cameron Indoor Stadium (3,405); Durham, NC
January 28, 2018; 2:00 pm, ACCN Extra	No. 18	at Pittsburgh	W 58–46	17–5 (6–3)	20 – Brown	10 – Mathias	4 – tied	Petersen Events Center (2,430); Pittsburgh, PA
February 1, 2018; 7:00 pm, ACCN Extra	No. 19	Georgia Tech	W 77–59	18–5 (7–3)	24 – Brown	8 – tied	6 – Brown	Cameron Indoor Stadium (3,311); Durham, NC
February 4, 2018; 1:00 pm, ESPN2	No. 19	No. 5 Notre Dame	L 54–72	18–6 (7–4)	16 – Brown	10 – Greenwell	3 – tied	Cameron Indoor Stadium (5,724); Durham, NC
February 7, 2018; 7:00 pm, ACCN Extra	No. 19	Wake Forest	W 59–51	19–6 (8–4)	21 – Brown	8 – tied	4 – Brown	Cameron Indoor Stadium (3,243); Durham, NC
February 11, 2018; 2:00 pm, ACCN Extra	No. 19	at Clemson	W 60–35	20–6 (9–4)	17 – Greenwell	11 – Greenwell	9 – Brown	Littlejohn Coliseum (829); Clemson, SC
February 15, 2018; 7:00 pm, ACCN Extra	No. 17	at Syracuse	L 65–68	20–7 (9–5)	20 – Brown	9 – Greenwell	5 – Greenwell	Carrier Dome (2,666); Syracuse, NY
February 19, 2018; 6:00 pm, ESPN2	No. 20	No. 9 Florida State	W 79–66	21–7 (10–5)	30 – Brown	12 – Odom	5 – Mathias	Cameron Indoor Stadium (4,127); Durham, NC
February 25, 2018; 2:00 pm, ACCN Extra	No. 20	North Carolina; Rivalry	W 70–54	22–7 (11–5)	31 – Greenwell	13 – Greenwell	11 – Brown	Cameron Indoor Stadium (9,314); Durham, NC
ACC Women's Tournament
March 2, 2018; 11:00 am, ACCN Extra	(4) No. 18	vs. (5) No. 23 NC State; Quarterfinals	L 45–51	22–8	16 – Brown	9 – Odom	3 – Brown	Greensboro Coliseum (5,613); Greensboro, NC
NCAA Women's Tournament
March 17, 2018*; 12:00 pm, ESPN2	(5 A) No. 20	vs. (12 A) No. 23 Belmont; First Round	W 72–58	23–8	25 – Odom	8 – Suggs	5 – Brown	Stegeman Coliseum; Athens, GA
March 19, 2018*; 6:30 pm, ESPN2	(5 A) No. 20	at (4 A) No. 18 Georgia; Second Round	W 66–40	24–8	16 – Odom	9 – Greenwell	6 – Brown	Stegeman Coliseum (2,908); Athens, GA
March 24, 2018*; 1:30 pm, ESPN	(5 A) No. 20	vs. (1 A) No. 1 Connecticut; Sweet Sixteen	L 59–72	24–9	22 – Odom	8 – 2 tied	4 – 2 tied	Times Union Center (10,658); Albany, NY
*Non-conference game. ^{#}Rankings from AP Poll,. (#) Tournament seedings in parentheses. A=Albany Region. All times are in Eastern Time.

== See also ==
- 2017–18 Duke Blue Devils men's basketball team
