= 2017–18 Pittsburgh Panthers women's basketball team =

Intercollegiate basketball season

2017–18 Pittsburgh Panthers women's basketball
- Conference: Atlantic Coast Conference
- Record: 10–20 (2–14 ACC)
- Head coach: Suzie McConnell-Serio (5th season)
- Assistant coaches: Kathy McConnell-Miller; Lindsay Richards; Amadou Koundoul
- Home arena: Petersen Events Center

2017–18 ACC women's basketball standings
	Conf.				Overall
Team	W		L	PCT	W		L	PCT
No. 3 Louisville *†	15	–	1	.938	36	–	3	.923
No. 5 Notre Dame	15	–	1	.938	35	–	3	.921
No. 11 Florida State	12	–	4	.750	26	–	7	.788
No. 21 NC State	11	–	5	.688	26	–	9	.743
No. 20 Duke	11	–	5	.688	24	–	9	.727
Syracuse	10	–	6	.625	22	–	9	.710
Miami (FL)	10	–	6	.625	21	–	11	.656
Virginia	10	–	6	.625	19	–	14	.576
Virginia Tech	6	–	10	.375	23	–	14	.622
Georgia Tech	6	–	10	.375	20	–	14	.588
Wake Forest	5	–	11	.313	14	–	17	.452
North Carolina	4	–	12	.250	15	–	16	.484
Pittsburgh	2	–	14	.125	10	–	20	.333
Boston College	2	–	14	.125	7	–	23	.233
Clemson	1	–	15	.063	11	–	19	.367
† 2018 ACC tournament winner * Tournament #1 seed As of 31 March 2018; Rankings from AP poll

The 2017–18 Pittsburgh Panthers women's basketball team represented Pittsburgh University during the 2017–18 NCAA Division I women's basketball season. The Panthers, led by fifth-year head coach Suzie McConnell-Serio, played their home games at the Petersen Events Center and were members of the Atlantic Coast Conference. They finished the season 10–20, 2–14 in ACC play to finish in a tie for thirteenth place. They lost in the first round of the ACC women's tournament to Wake Forest.

On April 5, McConnell-Serio was fired. She finished at Pittsburgh with a five-year record of 67–87.

== Previous season ==
The Panthers finished the season 13–17, 4–12 in ACC play to finish in a tie for eleventh place. They lost in the first round of the ACC women's tournament to North Carolina.

== Media ==
=== Pitt Panthers Sports Network ===
The Pitt Panthers Sports Network broadcast all Panthers games on WJAS. George Von Benko provided the play-by-play while Jen Tuscano provided the analysis. Non-televised home games were aired online via Pitt Panthers TV with the Panthers Sports Network call.

== Roster ==
2017–18 Pittsburgh Panthers women's basketball team
Players
Coaches

Pos.	#	Name	Height	Year	Previous school	Hometown
F	1	Danielle Garven	6 ft 1 in (1.85 m)	Jr	St. John Paul II; Chipola	Toronto, ON
G	2	Aysia Bugg	5 ft 7 in (1.7 m)	Sr	Bolingbrook	Chicago, IL
G	3	Jasmine Whitney	5 ft 9 in (1.75 m)	So	Paul IV	Centreville, VA
G	4	Tania Lamb	5 ft 7 in (1.7 m)	Jr	Long Beach Poly	Los Angeles, CA
F	5	Kauai Bradley	6 ft 0 in (1.83 m)	Jr	Marian Catholic	Chicago, IL
G	10	Cassidy Walsh	5 ft 7 in (1.7 m)	Jr	Seton-La Salle	Pittsburgh, PA
C	11	Cara Judkins	6 ft 2 in (1.88 m)	Fr	Our Lady of Good Counsel	Bethesda, MD
F	12	Yacine Diop	5 ft 10 in (1.78 m)	RS Jr	Seton-La Salle	Dakar, Senegal
G	13	Kyla Nelson	5 ft 11 in (1.8 m)	Fr	Oaklands	Worthing, England
G	20	Pika Rodriguez	5 ft 11 in (1.8 m)	Fr	Capital Prep Magnet	Hartford, CT
F	22	Jaala Henry	6 ft 3 in (1.91 m)	Fr	National Christian Academy	Riverdale, MD
G	23	Alayna Gribble	6 ft 0 in (1.83 m)	So	Norwin	Pittsburgh, PA
F	32	Kalista Walters	6 ft 0 in (1.83 m)	Jr	Bethlehem Catholic	Fleetwood, PA
F	44	Magatte Sall	6 ft 2 in (1.88 m)	Fr	Victory Rock Prep	Thiès, Senegal

Head coach

- Suzie McConnell-Serio (Penn State)

Assistant coach(es)

- Kathy McConnell-Miller (Virginia)
- Lindsay Richards (Iowa)
- Amadou Koundoul (Cleveland State)

Legend

- (C) Team captain
- (S) Suspended
- (I) Ineligible
- (W) Walk-on
- Injured
- Current redshirt

Roster
Last update: February 25, 2018

== Schedule ==
Date time, TV	Rank^{#}	Opponent^{#}	Result	Record	Site (attendance) city, state
Exhibition
November 5, 2017; 2:00 pm		IUP	L 68–73	–	Peterson Events Center (560); Pittsburgh, PA
Regular season
November 10, 2017*; 7:00 pm, ACCN Extra		Youngstown State	W 66–58	1–0	Peterson Events Center (762); Pittsburgh, PA
November 13, 2017*; 11:00 am, ACCN Extra		Cornell	W 51–39	2–0	Peterson Events Center (10,587); Pittsburgh, PA
November 16, 2017*; 7:00 pm, ACCN Extra		Duquesne; City Game	L 53–66	2–1	Peterson Events Center (1,410); Pittsburgh, PA
November 19, 2017*; 2:00 pm, ACCN Extra		Towson	W 81–63	3–1	Peterson Events Center (1,124); Pittsburgh, PA
November 21, 2017*; 7:00 pm		at Cincinnati	W 66–46	4–1	Saint Ursula Academy Gym (524); Cincinnati, OH
November 25, 2017*; 6:00 pm, ACCN Extra		Arkansas State	W 87–47	5–1	Peterson Events Center (629); Pittsburgh, PA
November 29, 2017*; 3:30 pm, ACCN Extra		Wisconsin; ACC–Big Ten Women's Challenge	L 57–58	5–2	Peterson Events Center (762); Pittsburgh, PA
December 3, 2017*; 2:00 pm		at Fordham	L 55–58	5–3	Rose Hill Gymnasium (804); Bronx, NY
December 7, 2017*; 7:00 pm		at No. 10 West Virginia	L 52–73	5–4	WVU Coliseum (2,005); Morgantown, WV
December 9, 2017*; 1:00 pm, ACCN Extra		UNC Wilmington	W 74–55	6–4	Peterson Events Center (621); Pittsburgh, PA
December 17, 2017*; 2:00 pm, ACCN Extra		Penn State	L 48–59	6–5	Peterson Events Center (2,097); Pittsburgh, PA
December 20, 2017*; 2:00 pm, ACCN Extra		Bucknell	W 57–39	7–5	Peterson Events Center (432); Pittsburgh, PA
December 28, 2017; 7:00 pm, ACCN Extra		at Virginia	L 50–62	7–6 (0–1)	John Paul Jones Arena (2,822); Charlottesville, VA
December 31, 2017*; 1:00 pm, ACCN Extra		Chicago State	W 87–49	8–6	Peterson Events Center (567); Pittsburgh, PA
January 4, 2018; 7:00 pm, ACCN Extra		Wake Forest	L 49–58	8–7 (0–2)	Peterson Events Center (463); Pittsburgh, PA
January 7, 2018; 2:00 pm, ACCN Extra		at North Carolina	L 67–68	8–8 (0–3)	Carmichael Arena (2,327); Chapel Hill, NC
January 11, 2018; 7:00 pm, ACCN Extra		at Virginia Tech	L 69–89	8–9 (0–4)	Cassell Coliseum (2,256); Blacksburg, VA
January 14, 2018; 2:00 pm, ACCN Extra		Georgia Tech	W 68–62	9–9 (1–4)	Peterson Events Center (812); Pittsburgh, PA
January 18, 2018; 2:00 pm, ACCN Extra		No. 2 Louisville	L 51–77	9–10 (1–5)	Peterson Events Center (441); Pittsburgh, PA
January 21, 2018; 2:00 pm, ACCN Extra		at Syracuse	L 52–70	9–11 (1–6)	Carrier Dome (8,126); Syracuse, NY
January 25, 2018; 7:00 pm, ACCN Extra		No. 5 Notre Dame	L 53–87	9–12 (1–7)	Peterson Events Center (760); Pittsburgh, PA
January 28, 2018; 2:00 pm, ACCN Extra		No. 18 Duke	L 46–58	9–13 (1–8)	Peterson Events Center (2,430); Pittsburgh, PA
February 1, 2018; 7:00 pm, ACCN Extra		at Clemson	W 58–42	10–13 (2–8)	Littlejohn Coliseum (675); Clemson, SC
February 4, 2018; 1:00 pm, RSN		No. 10 Florida State	L 59–66	10–14 (2–9)	Peterson Events Center (1,755); Pittsburgh, PA
February 11, 2018; 1:00 pm, ACCN Extra		at Boston College	L 61–72	10–15 (2–10)	Conte Forum (1,435); Chestnut Hill, MA
February 15, 2018; 7:00 pm, ACCN Extra		at Miami (FL)	L 58–82	10–16 (2–11)	Watsco Center (840); Coral Gables, FL
February 19, 2018; 7:00 pm, RSN		Syracuse	L 53–62	10–17 (2–12)	Peterson Events Center (638); Pittsburgh, PA
February 21, 2018; 7:00 pm, ACCN Extra		No. 21 NC State	L 66–77	10–18 (2–13)	Peterson Events Center (600); Pittsburgh, PA
February 25, 2018; 2:00 pm, ACCN Extra		at No. 4 Louisville	L 49–81	10–19 (2–14)	KFC Yum! Center (10,431); Louisville, KY
ACC Women's Tournament
February 28, 2018; 6:30 pm, ACCN Extra	(14)	vs. (11) Wake Forest; First Round	L 38–72	10–20	Greensboro Coliseum (2,810); Greensboro, NC
*Non-conference game. ^{#}Rankings from AP Poll. (#) Tournament seedings in parentheses. All times are in Eastern.

== Rankings ==
Regular season polls
Poll	Pre- season	Week 2	Week 3	Week 4	Week 5	Week 6	Week 7	Week 8	Week 9	Week 10	Week 11	Week 12	Week 13	Week 14	Week 15	Week 16	Week 17	Week 18	Week 19	Final
AP																				N/A
Coaches																				

Legend
	Increase in ranking
	Decrease in ranking
	No change
(RV)	Received votes
(NR)	Not ranked
