= 2017–18 Florida State Seminoles women's basketball team =

Intercollegiate basketball season

2017–18 Florida State Seminoles women's basketball

NCAA women's tournament, second round
- Conference: Atlantic Coast Conference

Ranking
- Coaches: No. 13
- AP: No. 11
- Record: 26–7 (12–4 ACC)
- Head coach: Sue Semrau (21st season)
- Assistant coaches: Lance White; Brooke Wyckoff; Danielle Atkinson
- Home arena: Donald L. Tucker Center (Capacity: 12,100)

2017–18 ACC women's basketball standings
	Conf.				Overall
Team	W		L	PCT	W		L	PCT
No. 3 Louisville *†	15	–	1	.938	36	–	3	.923
No. 5 Notre Dame	15	–	1	.938	35	–	3	.921
No. 11 Florida State	12	–	4	.750	26	–	7	.788
No. 21 NC State	11	–	5	.688	26	–	9	.743
No. 20 Duke	11	–	5	.688	24	–	9	.727
Syracuse	10	–	6	.625	22	–	9	.710
Miami (FL)	10	–	6	.625	21	–	11	.656
Virginia	10	–	6	.625	19	–	14	.576
Virginia Tech	6	–	10	.375	23	–	14	.622
Georgia Tech	6	–	10	.375	20	–	14	.588
Wake Forest	5	–	11	.313	14	–	17	.452
North Carolina	4	–	12	.250	15	–	16	.484
Pittsburgh	2	–	14	.125	10	–	20	.333
Boston College	2	–	14	.125	7	–	23	.233
Clemson	1	–	15	.063	11	–	19	.367
† 2018 ACC tournament winner * Tournament #1 seed As of 31 March 2018; Rankings from AP poll

The 2017–18 Florida State Seminoles women's basketball team, variously Florida State or FSU, represents Florida State University during the 2017–18 NCAA Division I basketball season. Florida State competes in Division I of the National Collegiate Athletic Association (NCAA). The Seminoles are led by head coach Sue Semrau, in her twenty-first year, and play their home games at the Donald L. Tucker Center on the university's Tallahassee, Florida campus. They were members of the Atlantic Coast Conference.

Florida State finished the season 26–7, 12–4 in ACC play, to finish in third place. The Seminoles advanced to the semifinals of the ACC women's tournament where they lost to Notre Dame. They received an at-large bid to the NCAA women's tournament where they defeated Little Rock in the first round before getting upset by Buffalo in the second round. Shakayla Thomas and Imani Wright went on to be selected in the WNBA draft.

== Previous season ==
For the 2016–17 season, the Seminoles achieved their best start in school history, reaching twenty wins faster than any other FSU team. Leticia Romero, Brittany Brown, Ivey Slaughter, and Kai James were among the senior class with the most wins in program history. Romero and James went on to be selected in the 2017 WNBA draft.

Florida State finished second in the ACC but was eliminated in the quarterfinals of the ACC tournament. The Seminoles received an at-large bid to the NCAA tournament as a three-seed, their fifth consecutive tournament appearance, reaching the Elite Eight for just the third time in school history.

== Roster ==
2017–18 Florida State Seminoles women's basketball team
Players
Coaches

Pos.	#	Name	Height	Year	Hometown
G	3	Sayawni Lassiter	5 ft 7 in (1.7 m)	Fr	Dorchester, MA
G	4	A. J. Alix	5 ft 6 in (1.68 m)	Fr	Houston, TX
F	11	Iho López	6 ft 2 in (1.88 m)	RS Fr	Blanes, Spain
G	12	Nicole Ekhomu	5 ft 9 in (1.75 m)	So	Bolingbrook, IL
G	13	Nausia Woolfolk	5 ft 9 in (1.75 m)	So	Fort Valley, GA
F	15	Kiah Gillespie	6 ft 2 in (1.88 m)	RS So	Meriden, CT
F	20	Shakayla Thomas	5 ft 11 in (1.8 m)	Sr	Sylacauga, AL
C	25	Ama Degbeon	6 ft 2 in (1.88 m)	Sr	Grünberg, Germany
G	31	Savannah Wilkinson	5 ft 11 in (1.8 m)	Fr	London, England
G	32	Imani Wright	5 ft 9 in (1.75 m)	RS Jr	Hooks, TX
C	50	Chatrice White	6 ft 3 in (1.91 m)	Sr	Shelby, NE

Head coach

- Sue Semrau (UC San Diego)

Assistant coach(es)

- Lance White (Texas Tech)
- Brooke Wyckoff (Florida State)
- Danielle Atkinson (Florida)

Legend

- (C) Team captain
- (S) Suspended
- (I) Ineligible
- (W) Walk-on
- Injured
- Current redshirt

Roster
Last update: January 11, 2018

== Rankings ==
Ranking movements Legend: ██ Increase in ranking ██ Decrease in ranking
	Week																				
Poll	Pre	1	2	3	4	5	6	7	8	9	10	11	12	13	14	15	16	17	18	19	Final
AP	18	18	17	13	13	13	12	13	13	11	13	12	8	10	12	12	9	11	11	11	Not released
Coaches	14	14	14^	11	11	10	10	13	13	12	12	11	8	11	12	12	9	11	11	14	13

^Coaches' Poll did not release a second poll. The pre-season ranking is used for comparison.

== Schedule and results ==
Date time, TV	Rank^{#}	Opponent^{#}	Result	Record	Site (attendance) city, state
Non–Conference Regular season
November 10*; 7:00 p.m., ACCN Extra	No. 18	North Florida	W 109–51	1–0	Donald L. Tucker Center (2,637); Tallahassee, FL
November 12*; 4:30 p.m.	No. 18	at Jacksonville State	W 75–51	2–0	Pete Mathews Coliseum (1,191); Jacksonville, AL
November 17*; 7:00 p.m.	No. 17	at Florida	W 84–54	3–0	O'Connell Center (2,989); Gainesville, FL
November 19*; 5:00 p.m.	No. 17	at Grambling State	W 96–53	4–0	Fredrick C. Hobdy Assembly Center (661); Grambling, LA
November 24*; 4:00 p.m., ACCN Extra	No. 13	Sacred Heart	W 101–52	5–0	Donald L. Tucker Center (3,233); Tallahassee, FL
November 26*; 2:00 p.m., ACCN Extra	No. 13	Samford	W 87–62	6–0	Donald L. Tucker Center (2,502); Tallahassee, FL
November 29*; 8:00 p.m., BTN	No. 13	at Iowa; ACC–Big Ten Women's Challenge	W 94–93	7–0	Carver–Hawkeye Arena (4,202); Iowa City, IA
December 3*; 2:00 p.m.	No. 13	at James Madison	W 79–63	8–0	JMU Convocation Center (2,092); Harrisonburg, VA
December 7*; 7:00 p.m., ACCN Extra	No. 13	Stetson	W 84–39	9–0	Donald L. Tucker Center (3,403); Tallahassee, FL
December 10*; 2:00 p.m., ACCN Extra	No. 13	Arizona State	W 77–66	10–0	Donald L. Tucker Center (3,671); Tallahassee, FL
December 17*; 12:30 p.m.	No. 12	at No. 8 Texas	L 72–87	10–1	Frank Erwin Center (4,202); Austin, TX
December 21*; 7:00 p.m.	No. 13	at Creighton	W 92–82	11–1	D. J. Sokol Arena (760); Omaha, NE
December 28*; 7:00 p.m., ACCN Extra	No. 13	Jacksonville	W 82–50	12–1	Donald L. Tucker Center (2,900); Tallahassee, FL
ACC Regular season
December 31; 2:00 p.m., ACCN Extra	No. 13	North Carolina	W 102–65	13–1 (1–0)	Donald L. Tucker Center (3,219); Tallahassee, FL
January 4; 7:00 p.m.	No. 11	at Clemson	W 69–47	14–1 (2–0)	Littlejohn Coliseum (589); Clemson, SC
January 7; 1:00 p.m.	No. 11	at Syracuse	L 69–76	14–2 (2–1)	Carrier Dome (1,803); Syracuse, NY
January 11; 7:00 p.m.	No. 13	Miami (FL)	W 105–67	15–2 (3–1)	Donald L. Tucker Center (3,281); Tallahassee, FL
January 14; 2:30 p.m.	No. 13	Virginia Tech	W 107–62	16–2 (4–1)	Donald L. Tucker Center (4,983); Tallahassee, FL
January 18; 7:00 p.m., ACCN Extra	No. 12	at Wake Forest	W 81–79 ^{OT}	17–2 (5–1)	LJVM Coliseum (379); Winston-Salem, NC
January 21; 5:00 p.m., ESPN2	No. 12	at No. 2 Louisville	W 50–49	18–2 (6–1)	KFC Yum! Center (14,248); Louisville, KY
January 28; 4:00 p.m., ESPN2	No. 8	No. 2 Notre Dame	L 69–100	18–3 (6–2)	Donald L. Tucker Center (9,498); Tallahassee, FL
February 1; 7:00 p.m., ACCN Extra	No. 10	at NC State	L 56–65	18–4 (6–3)	Reynolds Coliseum (2,253); Raleigh, NC
February 4; 1:00 p.m., ACCN Extra	No. 10	at Pittsburgh	W 66–59	19–4 (7–3)	Petersen Events Center (1,755); Pittsburgh, PA
February 8; 7:00 p.m., ACCN Extra	No. 12	Virginia	W 77–62	20–4 (8–3)	Donald L. Tucker Center (2,843); Tallahassee, FL
February 11; 4:00 p.m., ESPN2	No. 12	at Miami (FL)	W 91–71	21–4 (9–3)	BankUnited Center (2,527); Coral Gables, FL
February 15; 4:00 p.m., ACCN Extra	No. 12	Clemson	W 91–43	22–4 (10–3)	Donald L. Tucker Center (3,102); Tallahassee, FL
February 19; 6:00 p.m., ESPN2	No. 9	at No. 20 Duke	L 66–79	22–5 (10–4)	Cameron Indoor Stadium (4,127); Durham, NC
February 22; 7:00 p.m., ACCN Extra	No. 9	Boston College	W 67–39	23–5 (11–4)	Donald L. Tucker Center (3,090); Tallahassee, FL
February 25; 1:00 p.m.	No. 9	Georgia Tech	W 64–61	24–5 (12–4)	Donald L. Tucker Center (3,357); Tallahassee, FL
ACC Women's Tournament
March 2; 8:00 p.m., ACCN Extra	(3) No. 11	vs. (6) Miami (FL); Quarterfinals	W 73–69	25–5	Greensboro Coliseum (4,316); Greensboro, NC
March 3; 2:30 p.m., ESPNU	(3) No. 11	vs. (2) No. 5 Notre Dame; Semifinals	L 80–90	25–6	Greensboro Coliseum (6,160); Greensboro, NC
NCAA Women's Tournament
March 17*; 11:00 a.m., ESPN2	(3 A) No. 11	(14 A) Little Rock; First Round	W 91–49	26–6	Donald L. Tucker Center; Tallahassee, FL
March 19*; 6:30 p.m., ESPN2	(3 A) No. 11	(11 A) Buffalo; Second Round	L 65–86	26–7	Donald L. Tucker Center (4,119); Tallahassee, FL
*Non-conference game. ^{#}Rankings from AP Poll. (#) Tournament seedings in parentheses. A=Albany Region. All times are in Eastern Time.
