= 2017–18 NC State Wolfpack women's basketball team =

Intercollegiate basketball season

2017–18 NC State Wolfpack women's basketball

NCAA Women's Tournament, Sweet Sixteen
- Conference: Atlantic Coast Conference

Ranking
- Coaches: No. 16
- AP: No. 21
- Record: 26–9 (11–5 ACC)
- Head coach: Wes Moore (5th season)
- Assistant coaches: Nikki West; Gene Hill; Lindsay Edmonds
- Home arena: Reynolds Coliseum

2017–18 ACC women's basketball standings
	Conf.				Overall
Team	W		L	PCT	W		L	PCT
No. 3 Louisville *†	15	–	1	.938	36	–	3	.923
No. 5 Notre Dame	15	–	1	.938	35	–	3	.921
No. 11 Florida State	12	–	4	.750	26	–	7	.788
No. 21 NC State	11	–	5	.688	26	–	9	.743
No. 20 Duke	11	–	5	.688	24	–	9	.727
Syracuse	10	–	6	.625	22	–	9	.710
Miami (FL)	10	–	6	.625	21	–	11	.656
Virginia	10	–	6	.625	19	–	14	.576
Virginia Tech	6	–	10	.375	23	–	14	.622
Georgia Tech	6	–	10	.375	20	–	14	.588
Wake Forest	5	–	11	.313	14	–	17	.452
North Carolina	4	–	12	.250	15	–	16	.484
Pittsburgh	2	–	14	.125	10	–	20	.333
Boston College	2	–	14	.125	7	–	23	.233
Clemson	1	–	15	.063	11	–	19	.367
† 2018 ACC tournament winner * Tournament #1 seed As of 31 March 2018; Rankings from AP poll

The 2017–18 NC State Wolfpack women's basketball team represented North Carolina State University during the 2017–18 NCAA Division I women's basketball season. The Wolfpack, led by fifth-year head coach Wes Moore, played their home games at Reynolds Coliseum and were members of the Atlantic Coast Conference. They finished the season 26–9, 11–5 in ACC play to finish in a tie for fourth place. They advanced to the semifinals of the ACC women's tournament, where they lost to Louisville. They received an at-large bid to the NCAA women's tournament, where they defeated Elon and Maryland in the first and second rounds before losing to Mississippi State in the sweet sixteen.

== Roster ==
2017–18 NC State Wolfpack women's basketball team
Players
Coaches

Pos.	#	Name	Height	Year	Previous school	Hometown
G	1	Aislinn Konig	5 ft 9 in (1.75 m)	So	Brookswood Secondary	Surrey, BC
G	2	Kaila Ealey	5 ft 8 in (1.73 m)	RS So	Needham Broughton	Raleigh, NC
G	3	Kai Crutchfield	5 ft 8 in (1.73 m)	Fr	Millbrook	Raleigh, NC
F	5	Chelsea Nelson	6 ft 2 in (1.88 m)	Sr	John Overton	Antioch, TN
G	11	Kiara Leslie	6 ft 0 in (1.83 m)	RS Jr	Holly Springs	Holly Springs, NC
F	21	DD Rodgers	6 ft 1 in (1.85 m)	Jr	Myers Park	Charlotte, NC
G	23	Grace Hunter	5 ft 9 in (1.75 m)	RS So	Athens Drive	Raleigh, NC
F	24	Erika Cassell	6 ft 2 in (1.88 m)	So	Holy Innocents	Marietta, GA
F	25	Kayla Jones	6 ft 1 in (1.85 m)	Fr	Riverside	Jamesville, NC
C	32	Akela Maize	6 ft 5 in (1.96 m)	Jr	New Hope Christian Academy	Greensboro, NC
G	40	Katie Wadsworth	5 ft 6 in (1.68 m)	Jr	Needham Broughton	Raleigh, NC
C	44	Nae Nae Cole	6 ft 3 in (1.91 m)	Jr	Paul IV	Gainesville, VA
G	50	Armani Hawkins	5 ft 10 in (1.78 m)	RS Jr	Mountain View	Mesa, AZ

Head coach

- Wes Moore (NC State)

Assistant coach(es)

- Nikki West (Clemson)
- Gene Hill (Georgia Tech)
- Lindsay Edmonds (Appalachian State)

Legend

- (C) Team captain
- (S) Suspended
- (I) Ineligible
- (W) Walk-on
- Injured
- Current redshirt

Roster
Last update: February 20, 2018

== Schedule ==
Date time, TV	Rank^{#}	Opponent^{#}	Result	Record	Site (attendance) city, state
Exhibition
November 2, 2017*; 7:00 pm		Lee	W 57–42	–	Reynolds Coliseum (615); Raleigh, NC
Non-conference regular season
November 10, 2017*; 5:00 pm, ACCN Extra		Jacksonville	W 64–44	1–0	Reynolds Coliseum (1,757); Raleigh, NC
November 12, 2017*; 2:00 pm, ACCN Extra		Davidson	W 73–49	2–0	Reynolds Coliseum (1,809); Raleigh, NC
November 15, 2017*; 7:00 pm, ACCN Extra		UNC Asheville	W 87–55	3–0	Reynolds Coliseum (1,686); Raleigh, NC
November 17, 2017*; 7:00 pm, ACCN Extra		South Alabama	W 71–50	4–0	Reynolds Coliseum (1,997); Raleigh, NC
November 20, 2017*; 7:00 pm		at Old Dominion	W 73–56	5–0	Ted Constant Convocation Center (1,706); Norfolk, VA
November 23, 2017*; 2:30 pm		vs. Alabama; Puerto Rico Clasico	W 68–49	6–0	Cardinal Gibbons Arena (57); Fort Lauderdale, FL
November 24, 2017*; 2:30 pm		vs. South Dakota State; Puerto Rico Clasico	L 67–75	6–1	Cardinal Gibbons Arena (132); Fort Lauderdale, FL
November 30, 2017*; 6:00 pm, BTN		at Rutgers; ACC–Big Ten Women's Challenge	L 53–57	6–2	Louis Brown Athletic Center (1,215); Piscataway, NJ
December 3, 2017*; 2:00 pm, ACCN Extra		Tulane	W 79–55	7–2	Reynolds Coliseum (2,088); Raleigh, NC
December 10, 2017*; 2:00 pm, ACCN Extra		Georgetown	W 63–49	8–2	Reynolds Coliseum (2,174); Raleigh, NC
December 14, 2017*; 7:00 pm, ACCN Extra		East Tennessee State	W 70–58	9–2	Reynolds Coliseum (1,697); Raleigh, NC
December 16, 2017*; 6:00 pm, ACCN Extra		Elon	W 70–57	10–2	Reynolds Coliseum (2,002); Raleigh, NC
December 19, 2017*; 6:00 pm, SECN Plus		at Vanderbilt	W 83–72	11–2	Memorial Gymnasium (2,292); Nashville, TN
ACC regular season
December 28, 2017; 2:30 pm, ACCN extra		at Virginia Tech	W 68–51	12–2 (1–0)	Cassell Coliseum (2,132); Blacksburg, VA
December 31, 2017; 2:30 pm, RSN		No. 3 Louisville	L 47–55	12–3 (1–1)	Reynolds Coliseum (2,685); Raleigh, NC
January 4, 2018; 7:00 pm, ACCN Extra		Virginia	L 63–73	12–4 (1–2)	Reynolds Coliseum (1,801); Raleigh, NC
January 7, 2018; 2:30 pm, RSN		at No. 17 Duke	L 56–69	12–5 (1–3)	Cameron Indoor Stadium (4,531); Durham, NC
January 10, 2018; 7:00 pm, ACCN Extra		Georgia Tech	W 56–43	13–5 (2–3)	Reynolds Coliseum (2,421); Raleigh, NC
January 14, 2018; 2:00 pm, ACCN Extra		Syracuse	W 60–56	14–5 (3–3)	Reynolds Coliseum (2,855); Raleigh, NC
January 18, 2018; 4:00 pm, ACCN Extra		at North Carolina; Rivalry	W 66–53	15–5 (4–3)	Carmichael Arena (2,037); Chapel Hill, NC
January 25, 2018; 7:00 pm, RSN		at Wake Forest; Rivalry	W 82–68	16–5 (5–3)	LJVM Coliseum (517); Winston–Salem, NC
January 28, 2018; 3:00 pm, RSN		at Clemson	W 62–41	17–5 (6–3)	Littlejohn Coliseum (1,343); Clemson, SC
February 1, 2018; 7:00 pm, ACCN Extra		No. 10 Florida State	W 65–56	18–5 (7–3)	Reynolds Coliseum (2,253); Raleigh, NC
February 4, 2018; 2:00 pm, ACCN Extra		Boston College	W 72–53	19–5 (8–3)	Reynolds Coliseum (2,619); Raleigh, NC
February 8, 2018; 7:00 pm, ACCN Extra	No. 23	at Miami (FL)	L 48–52	19–6 (8–4)	Watsco Center (786); Coral Gables, FL
February 11, 2018; 3:00 pm, RSN	No. 23	North Carolina; Rivalry	W 73–54	20–6 (9–4)	Reynolds Coliseum (5,500); Raleigh, NC
February 18, 2018; 12:00 pm, ESPNU	No. 25	Wake Forest; Rivalry/Play4Kay Game	W 74–61	21–6 (10–4)	Reynolds Coliseum (4,501); Raleigh, NC
February 22, 2018; 7:00 pm, ACCN Extra	No. 21	at Pittsburgh	W 77–66	22–6 (11–4)	Peterson Events Center (600); Pittsburgh, PA
February 25, 2018; 2:00 pm, ESPN2	No. 21	at No. 5 Notre Dame	L 67–86	22–7 (11–5)	Purcell Pavilion (8,786); South Bend, IN
ACC Women's Tournament
March 1, 2018; 11:00 am, ACCN Extra	(5) No. 23	vs. (12) North Carolina; Second Round	W 77–64	23–7	Greensboro Coliseum (6,164); Greensboro, NC
March 2, 2018; 11:00 am, ACCN Extra	(5) No. 23	vs. (4) No. 18 Duke; Quarterfinals	W 51–45	24–7	Greensboro Coliseum (5,613); Greensboro, NC
March 3, 2018; 12:00 pm, ESPNU	(5) No. 23	vs. (1) No. 4 Louisville; Semifinals	L 59–64	24–8	Greensboro Coliseum; Greensboro, NC
NCAA Women's Tournament
March 16, 2018*; 2:30 pm, ESPN2	(4 KC) No. 21	(13 KC) Elon; First Round	W 62–35	25–8	Reynolds Coliseum (2,669); Raleigh, NC
March 18, 2018*; 2:00 pm, ESPN2	(4 KC) No. 21	(5 KC) No. 16 Maryland; Second Round	W 74–60	26–8	Reynolds Coliseum (2,711); Raleigh, NC
March 23, 2018*; 7:00 pm, ESPN2	(4 KC) No. 21	vs. (1 KC) No. 4 Mississippi State; Sweet Sixteen	L 57–71	26–9	Sprint Center; Kansas City, MO
*Non-conference game. ^{#}Rankings from AP Poll. (#) Tournament seedings in parentheses. KC=Kansas City Region. All times are in Eastern.

== Rankings ==
Regular season polls
Poll	Pre- season	Week 2	Week 3	Week 4	Week 5	Week 6	Week 7	Week 8	Week 9	Week 10	Week 11	Week 12	Week 13	Week 14	Week 15	Week 16	Week 17	Week 18	Week 19	Final
AP											RV	RV	RV	23	25	21	23	21	21	N/A
Coaches		N/A									RV	RV	RV	23	25	22	22	22	22	16

Legend
	Increase in ranking
	Decrease in ranking
	Not ranked previous week
(RV)	Received votes
