= 2017–18 Virginia Cavaliers women's basketball team =

Intercollegiate basketball season

2017–18 Virginia Cavaliers women's basketball

NCAA Women's Tournament, second round
- Conference: Atlantic Coast Conference
- Record: 19–14 (10–6 ACC)
- Head coach: Joanne Boyle (7th season)
- Assistant coaches: La'Keshia Frett Meredith; Katherine Graham; Tim Taylor
- Home arena: John Paul Jones Arena

2017–18 ACC women's basketball standings
	Conf.				Overall
Team	W		L	PCT	W		L	PCT
No. 3 Louisville *†	15	–	1	.938	36	–	3	.923
No. 5 Notre Dame	15	–	1	.938	35	–	3	.921
No. 11 Florida State	12	–	4	.750	26	–	7	.788
No. 21 NC State	11	–	5	.688	26	–	9	.743
No. 20 Duke	11	–	5	.688	24	–	9	.727
Syracuse	10	–	6	.625	22	–	9	.710
Miami (FL)	10	–	6	.625	21	–	11	.656
Virginia	10	–	6	.625	19	–	14	.576
Virginia Tech	6	–	10	.375	23	–	14	.622
Georgia Tech	6	–	10	.375	20	–	14	.588
Wake Forest	5	–	11	.313	14	–	17	.452
North Carolina	4	–	12	.250	15	–	16	.484
Pittsburgh	2	–	14	.125	10	–	20	.333
Boston College	2	–	14	.125	7	–	23	.233
Clemson	1	–	15	.063	11	–	19	.367
† 2018 ACC tournament winner * Tournament #1 seed As of 31 March 2018; Rankings from AP poll

The 2017–18 Virginia Cavaliers women's basketball team represented the University of Virginia during the 2017–18 NCAA Division I women's basketball season. The Cavaliers, led by seventh-year head coach Joanne Boyle, played their home games at John Paul Jones Arena and were members the Atlantic Coast Conference. They finished the season 19–14, 10–6 in ACC play to finish in a three-way tie for sixth place. They advanced to the quarterfinals of the ACC women's tournament, where they lost to Notre Dame. They received an at-large bid to the NCAA women's tournament, which was their first trip since 2009, where they defeated California first round before losing to South Carolina in the second round.

On March 20, Boyle announced her retirement, initially citing an unspecified family matter. She would later reveal that she retired because of snags in her ongoing attempt to finalize the adoption of her Senegalese daughter. Boyle finished at Virginia with a record of 129–98.

== Roster ==
2017–18 Virginia Cavaliers women's basketball team
Players
Coaches

Pos.	#	Name	Height	Year	Previous school	Hometown
G	1	Brianna Tinsley	5 ft 7 in (1.7 m)	Fr	St. Anne's-Belfield	Madison, VA
F	2	Jae'Lisa Allen	6 ft 2 in (1.88 m)	Sr	White Hall	Pine Bluff, AR
F	3	Lauren Moses	6 ft 2 in (1.88 m)	Sr	Rancocas	Mt. Holly, NJ
G	4	Dominique Toussaint	5 ft 9 in (1.75 m)	So	Christ the King	Staten Island, NY
F	5	Khyasia Caldwell	5 ft 5 in (1.65 m)	Fr	Pocono Mountain East	Pocono Summit, PA
G	10	J'Kyra Brown	5 ft 11 in (1.8 m)	RS Sr	Rocky Mount; East Carolina	Rocky Mount, NC
G	13	Jocelyn Willoughby	6 ft 0 in (1.83 m)	So	Newark Academy	Woodbridge, VA
F	14	Lisa Jablonowski	6 ft 3 in (1.91 m)	So	Lycée de garçons	Steinsel, France
G	20	Amandine Toi	6 ft 1 in (1.85 m)	Fr	INSEP Academy	Paris, France
G	23	Aliyah Huland El	6 ft 1 in (1.85 m)	Sr	Randolph	Randolph, NJ
C	30	Felicia Aiyeotan	6 ft 9 in (2.06 m)	So	Blair Academy	Lagos, Nigeria
F	32	Moné Jones	6 ft 3 in (1.91 m)	Jr	Riverside	Durham, NC
F	35	Shakyna Payne	6 ft 3 in (1.91 m)	So	Southwest Atlanta Christian Academy	Acworth, GA

Head coach

- Joanne Boyle (Duke)

Assistant coach(es)

- La'Keisha Frett Meredith (Georgia)
- Katherine Graham (LSU)
- Tim Taylor (James Madison)

Legend

- (C) Team captain
- (S) Suspended
- (I) Ineligible
- (W) Walk-on
- Injured
- Current redshirt

Roster
Last update: 2/12/18

== Schedule ==
Date time, TV	Rank^{#}	Opponent^{#}	Result	Record	Site (attendance) city, state
Non-conference regular season
November 10*; 9:00 pm		at No. 7 Mississippi State	L 53–68	0–1	Humphrey Coliseum (6,811); Starkville, MS
November 12*; 2:00 pm, ACCN Extra		Central Connecticut	W 103–59	1–1	John Paul Jones Arena (3,306); Charlottesville, VA
November 16*; 7:00 pm, ACCN Extra		Georgia	L 61–64	1–2	John Paul Jones Arena (3,170); Charlottesville, VA
November 19*; 2:00 pm		at Dayton	L 46–61	1–3	UD Arena (1,866); Dayton, OH
November 21*; 7:00 pm, ACCN Extra		Hampton	W 66–62	2–3	John Paul Jones Arena (2,546); Charlottesville, VA
November 25*; 2:00 pm, ACCN Extra		Harvard; Cavalier Classic Tournament	W 50–48	3–3	John Paul Jones Arena (2,838); Charlottesville, VA
November 26*; 3:30 pm, ACCN Extra		Duquesne; Cavalier Classic Tournament	L 63–74	3–4	John Paul Jones Arena (2,846); Charlottesville, VA
November 29*; 7:00 pm, ACCN Extra		No. 15 Maryland; ACC–Big Ten Women's Challenge	L 59–60	3–5	John Paul Jones Arena (3,082); Charlottesville, VA
December 2*; 6:00 pm, ACCN Extra		UNC Greensboro	W 68–50	4–5	John Paul Jones Arena (2,642); Charlottesville, VA
December 4*; 2:00 pm, BTN		at Rutgers	L 43–52	4–6	Louis Brown Athletic Center (1,368); Piscataway, NJ
December 17*; 3:30 pm		vs. Ohio; West Palm Beach Invitational	W 77–59	5–6	Student Life Center (200); West Palm Beach, FL
December 18*; 12:00 pm		vs. Indiana; West Palm Beach Invitational	W 82–72 ^{OT}	6–6	Student Life Center (150); West Palm Beach, FL
December 21*; 7:00 pm, ACCN Extra		Manhattan	W 69–47	7–6	John Paul Jones Arena (2,383); Charlottesville, VA
ACC regular season
December 28; 7:00 pm, ACCN Extra		Pittsburgh	W 62–50	8–6 (1–0)	John Paul Jones Arena (2,822); Charlottesville, VA
December 31*; 2:00 pm, ACCN Extra		Syracuse	W 68–63	9–6 (2–0)	John Paul Jones Arena (2,979); Charlottesville, VA
January 4; 7:00 pm, ACCN Extra		NC State	W 73–63	10–6 (3–0)	Reynolds Coliseum (1,801); Raleigh, NC
January 7; 2:00 pm, ACCN Extra		Clemson	W 70–41	11–6 (4–0)	John Paul Jones Arena (3,995); Charlottesville, VA
January 11; 7:00 pm, ACCN Extra		at Boston College	W 68–57	12–6 (5–0)	Conte Forum (1,065); Chestnut Hill, MA
January 14; 3:00 pm, ESPN2		at No. 16 Duke	L 48–55	12–7 (5–1)	Cameron Indoor Stadium (3,856); Durham, NC
January 21; 12:30 pm, RSN		Virginia Tech; Commonwealth Clash	W 61–52	13–7 (6–1)	John Paul Jones Arena (4,212); Charlottesville, VA
January 25; 7:00 pm, ACCN Extra		North Carolina	W 82–70	14–7 (7–1)	John Paul Jones Arena (2,971); Charlottesville, VA
January 28; 1:00 pm, ACCN Extra		at Georgia Tech	W 62–56	15–7 (8–1)	McCamish Pavilion (1,601); Atlanta, GA
February 1; 7:00 pm, RSN		No. 4 Louisville	L 41–77	15–8 (8–2)	John Paul Jones Arena (2,877); Charlottesville, VA
February 8; 7:00 pm, ACCN Extra		at No. 12 Florida State	L 62–77	15–9 (8–3)	Tucker Center (2,843); Tallahassee, FL
February 11; 2:00 pm, ACCN Extra		at Virginia Tech; Commonwealth Cup	W 64–62	16–9 (9–3)	Cassell Coliseum (2,733); Blacksburg, VA
February 15; 7:00 pm, ACCN Extra		No. 5 Notre Dame	L 69–83	16–10 (9–4)	John Paul Jones Arena (3,038); Charlottesville, VA
February 18; 12:30 pm, RSN		Miami	L 62–77	16–11 (9–5)	John Paul Jones Arena (3,890); Charlottesville, VA
February 22; 7:00 pm, ACCN Extra		at No. 4 Louisville	L 39–51	16–12 (9–6)	KFC Yum! Center (8,434); Louisville, KY
February 25; 3:00 pm, RSN		at Wake Forest	W 48–41	17–12 (10–6)	LJVM Coliseum (786); Winston-Salem, NC
ACC Women's Tournament
March 1; 6:00 pm, ACCN Extra	(7)	vs. (10) Georgia Tech; Second Round	W 60–58	18–12	Greensboro Coliseum; Greensboro, NC
March 2; 6:00 pm, ACCN Extra	(7)	vs. (2) No. 5 Notre Dame; Quarterfinals	L 47–83	18–13	Greensboro Coliseum; Greensboro, NC
NCAA Women's Tournament
March 16*; 5:00 pm, ESPN2	(10 A)	vs. (7 A) California; First Round	W 68–62	19–13	Colonial Life Arena; Columbia, SC
March 18*; 9:00 pm, ESPN	(10 A)	at (2 A) No. 7 South Carolina; Second Round	L 56–66	19–14	Colonial Life Arena (10,037); Columbia, SC
*Non-conference game. ^{#}Rankings from AP Poll. (#) Tournament seedings in parentheses. A=Albany Region. All times are in Eastern.

== Rankings ==
Regular season polls
Poll	Pre- season	Week 2	Week 3	Week 4	Week 5	Week 6	Week 7	Week 8	Week 9	Week 10	Week 11	Week 12	Week 13	Week 14	Week 15	Week 16	Week 17	Week 18	Week 19	Final
AP	NR	NR	NR	NR	NR	NR	NR	NR	NR	NR	NR	NR	NR	NR	NR	NR	NR	NR	RV	N/A
Coaches	NR	NR	NR	NR	NR	NR	NR	NR	NR	NR	NR	NR	NR	NR	NR	RV	RV	RV	RV	RV

Legend
	Increase in ranking
	Decrease in ranking
	Not ranked previous week
(RV)	Received votes

== See also ==
- 2017–18 Virginia Cavaliers men's basketball team
