= 2017–18 Boston College Eagles women's basketball team =

Intercollegiate basketball season

2017–18 Boston College Eagles women's basketball
- Conference: Atlantic Coast Conference
- Record: 7–23 (2–14 ACC)
- Head coach: Erik Johnson (6th season)
- Assistant coaches: Yvonne Hawkins; Thomas Garrick; Latara King
- Home arena: Conte Forum

2017–18 ACC women's basketball standings
	Conf.				Overall
Team	W		L	PCT	W		L	PCT
No. 3 Louisville *†	15	–	1	.938	36	–	3	.923
No. 5 Notre Dame	15	–	1	.938	35	–	3	.921
No. 11 Florida State	12	–	4	.750	26	–	7	.788
No. 21 NC State	11	–	5	.688	26	–	9	.743
No. 20 Duke	11	–	5	.688	24	–	9	.727
Syracuse	10	–	6	.625	22	–	9	.710
Miami (FL)	10	–	6	.625	21	–	11	.656
Virginia	10	–	6	.625	19	–	14	.576
Virginia Tech	6	–	10	.375	23	–	14	.622
Georgia Tech	6	–	10	.375	20	–	14	.588
Wake Forest	5	–	11	.313	14	–	17	.452
North Carolina	4	–	12	.250	15	–	16	.484
Pittsburgh	2	–	14	.125	10	–	20	.333
Boston College	2	–	14	.125	7	–	23	.233
Clemson	1	–	15	.063	11	–	19	.367
† 2018 ACC tournament winner * Tournament #1 seed As of 31 March 2018; Rankings from AP poll

The 2017–18 Boston College Eagles women's basketball team represented Boston College during the 2017–18 NCAA Division I women's basketball season. The Eagles, were led by sixth year head coach Erik Johnson. They played their home games at the Conte Forum and were members of the Atlantic Coast Conference. They finished the season 7–23, 2–14 in ACC play in a tie for thirteenth place. They lost in the first round of the ACC women's tournament to Pittsburgh.

On March 1, head coach Erik Johnson resigns. He finished at Boston College with a six-year record of 68–115. On April 10, Boston College hired former Albany head coach Joanna Bernabei-McNamee to be the next head coach for Boston College.

== Previous season ==
They finished the season 9–21, 2–14 in ACC play to finish in last place. They lost in the first round of the ACC women's tournament to Georgia Tech.

== 2016–17 media ==
=== Boston College IMG Sports Network Affiliates ===
Select BC games, mostly home games and conference road games, will be broadcast on ZBC Sports. BC Game notes and stories will continue to be posted through their athletic website and on Twitter by following @bc_wbb.

== Roster ==
2017–18 Boston College Eagles women's basketball team
Players
Coaches

Pos.	#	Name	Height	Year	Previous school	Hometown
G	1	Stephanie Jones	5 ft 7 in (1.7 m)	Jr	Loomis Chaffee School	Shelton, CT
F	2	Georgia Pineau	6 ft 1 in (1.85 m)	So	Caulfield Grammar	Victoria, Australia
G	3	Andie Anastos	5 ft 8 in (1.73 m)	GS	Livonia Ladywood	Farmington Hills, MI
G	4	Taylor Ortlepp	5 ft 9 in (1.75 m)	So	St. Ignatius College	Adelaide, Australia
G	5	Rachel Gartner	5 ft 8 in (1.73 m)	RS Sr	Danbury	Danbury, CT
F	11	Emma Guy	6 ft 3 in (1.91 m)	So	Penfield	Penfield, NY
G/F	20	Jasmine Taylor	6 ft 0 in (1.83 m)	So	Bishop O'Connell	Springfield, VA
G	21	Martina Mosetti	5 ft 9 in (1.75 m)	Sr	Niccolo Tron	Trieste, Italy
G	23	Milan Bolden-Morris	5 ft 10 in (1.78 m)	Fr	Cardinal Newman	Belle Glade, FL
G/F	25	Isabelle Robinson (W)	6 ft 0 in (1.83 m)	So	Moses Brown	Dighton, MA
G	31	Sydney Lowery	5 ft 10 in (1.78 m)	Fr	St. Luke's School	Shelton, CT
C	42	Katie Quandt	6 ft 3 in (1.91 m)	Sr	Lakeville South	Lakeville, MN

Head coach

- Erik Johnson (UC San Diego)

Assistant coach(es)

- Yvonne Hawkins (Ashland)
- Thomas Garrick (Rhode Island)
- Latara King (Florida Memorial)

Legend

- (C) Team captain
- (S) Suspended
- (I) Ineligible
- (W) Walk-on
- Injured
- Current redshirt

Roster
Last update: February 25, 2018

== Schedule ==
Date time, TV	Rank^{#}	Opponent^{#}	Result	Record	Site (attendance) city, state
Non-conference regular season
11/10/2017*; 12:00 pm, ACCN Extra		Bryant	W 65–42	1–0	Conte Forum (748); Chestnut Hill, MA
11/12/2017*; 2:00 pm		at Dartmouth	L 57–68	1–1	Leede Arena (537); Hanover, NH
11/16/2017*; 11:00 am, ACCN Extra		Fordham	W 55–52	2–1	Conte Forum (2,563); Chestnut Hill, MA
11/19/2017*; 8:00 pm		at Minnesota	L 68–78	2–2	Williams Arena (2,454); Minneapolis, MN
11/22/2017*; 6:00 pm, ACCN Extra		Houston	W 79–74	3–2	Conte Forum (891); Chestnut Hill, MA
11/26/2017*; 1:00 pm		at Boston University; Green Line Rivalry	L 57–61	3–3	Case Gym (335); Boston, MA
11/29/2017*; 11:00 am		at Columbia	L 60–68	3–4	Levien Gymnasium (2,372); New York, NY
12/03/2017*; 1:00 pm, ACCN Extra		Fairfield	L 58–66	3–5	Conte Forum (2,372); Chestnut Hill, MA
12/06/2017*; 7:05 pm		at Holy Cross	W 70–66	4–5	Hart Center (987); Worcester, MA
12/10/2017*; 1:00 pm, ACCN Extra		Seton Hall	L 53–73	4–6	Conte Forum (1,249); Chestnut Hill, MA
12/17/2017*; 3:00 pm, ACCN Extra		New Hampshire	W 64–55 ^{OT}	5–6	Conte Forum (1,041); Chestnut Hill, MA
12/21/2017*; 12:00 pm		at Providence	L 55–63	5–7	Alumni Hall (424); Providence, RI
12/28/2017*; 7:00 pm, ACCN Extra		Maine	L 40–61	5–8	Conte Forum (1,337); Chestnut Hill, MA
ACC regular season
12/31/2017; 2:00 pm, ACCN Extra		at Virginia Tech	L 58–89	5–9 (0–1)	Cassell Coliseum (2,349); Blacksburg, VA
01/05/2018; 11:00 am, ACCN Extra		North Carolina	W 77–64	6–9 (1–1)	Conte Forum (747); Chestnut Hill, MA
01/11/2018; 7:00 pm, ACCN Extra		Virginia	L 57–68	6–10 (1–2)	Conte Forum (1,065); Chestnut Hill, MA
01/14/2018; 1:00 pm, ACCN Extra		at No. 2 Notre Dame	L 60–89	6–11 (1–3)	Edmund P. Joyce Center (8,208); South Bend, IN
01/18/2018; 7:00 pm, ACCN Extra		at Clemson	L 61–65 ^{OT}	6–12 (1–4)	Littlejohn Coliseum (599); Clemson, SC
01/21/2018; 1:00 pm, ACCN Extra		at Miami (FL)	L 43–65	6–13 (1–5)	Watsco Center (1,232); Coral Gables, FL
01/25/2018; 7:00 pm, ACCN Extra		at No. 18 Duke	L 50–75	6–14 (1–6)	Cameron Indoor Stadium (3,405); Durham, NH
01/28/2018; 1:00 pm, ACCN Extra		Syracuse	L 57–75	6–15 (1–7)	Conte Forum (1,817); Chestnut Hill, MA
02/01/2018; 1:00 pm, ACCN Extra		Wake Forest	L 59–67	6–16 (1–8)	Conte Forum (1,027); Chestnut Hill, MA
02/04/2018; 2:00 pm, ACCN Extra		at NC State	L 53–72	6–17 (1–9)	Reynolds Coliseum (2,619); Raleigh, NC
02/08/2018; 7:00 pm, ACCN Extra		at Georgia Tech	L 43–67	6–18 (1–10)	Hank McCamish Pavilion (1,014); Atlanta, GA
02/11/2018; 1:00 pm, ACCN Extra		Pittsburgh	W 72–61	7–18 (2–10)	Conte Forum (1,435); Chestnut Hill, MA
02/15/2018; 1:00 pm, ACCN Extra		No. 4 Louisville	L 52–87	7–19 (2–11)	Conte Forum (929); Chestnut Hill, MA
02/18/2018; 1:00 pm, ACCN Extra		No. 5 Notre Dame	L 55–89	7–20 (2–12)	Conte Forum (2,009); Chestnut Hill, MA
02/22/2018; 7:00 pm, ACCN Extra		at No. 9 Florida State	L 39–67	7–21 (2–13)	Donald L. Tucker Center (929); Tallahassee, FL
02/25/2018; 2:00 pm, ACCN Extra		at Syracuse	L 63–69	7–22 (2–14)	Carrier Dome (3,196); Syracuse, NY
ACC Women's Tournament
02/28/2018; 1:00 pm, ACCN Extra	(13)	vs. (12) North Carolina; First Round	L 64–69	7–23	Greensboro Coliseum; Greensboro, NC
*Non-conference game. ^{#}Rankings from AP Poll. (#) Tournament seedings in parentheses. All times are in Eastern.

== Rankings ==
Regular season polls
Poll	Pre- Season	Week 2	Week 3	Week 4	Week 5	Week 6	Week 7	Week 8	Week 9	Week 10	Week 11	Week 12	Week 13	Week 14	Week 15	Week 16	Week 17	Week 18	Week 19	Final
AP																				N/A
Coaches																				

Legend
	Increase in ranking
	Decrease in ranking
	No change
(RV)	Received votes
(NR)	Not ranked

== See also ==
- 2017–18 Boston College Eagles men's basketball team
