= 2017–18 Clemson Tigers women's basketball team =

Intercollegiate basketball season

2017–18 Clemson Tigers women's basketball
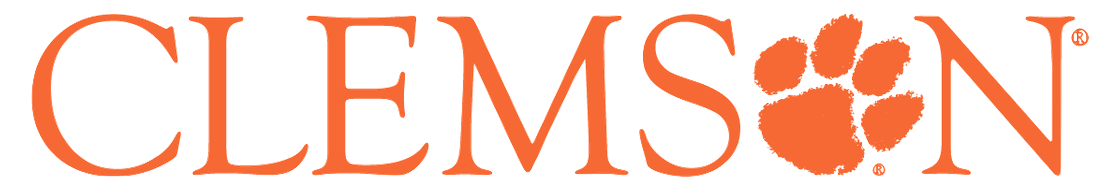
- Conference: Atlantic Coast Conference
- Record: 11–19 (1–15 ACC)
- Head coach: Audra Smith (5th season)
- Assistant coaches: Daryl Oliver (3rd season); Edgar Farmer (2nd season); Tiffany Sardin (2nd season)
- Home arena: Littlejohn Coliseum

2017–18 ACC women's basketball standings
	Conf.				Overall
Team	W		L	PCT	W		L	PCT
No. 3 Louisville *†	15	–	1	.938	36	–	3	.923
No. 5 Notre Dame	15	–	1	.938	35	–	3	.921
No. 11 Florida State	12	–	4	.750	26	–	7	.788
No. 21 NC State	11	–	5	.688	26	–	9	.743
No. 20 Duke	11	–	5	.688	24	–	9	.727
Syracuse	10	–	6	.625	22	–	9	.710
Miami (FL)	10	–	6	.625	21	–	11	.656
Virginia	10	–	6	.625	19	–	14	.576
Virginia Tech	6	–	10	.375	23	–	14	.622
Georgia Tech	6	–	10	.375	20	–	14	.588
Wake Forest	5	–	11	.313	14	–	17	.452
North Carolina	4	–	12	.250	15	–	16	.484
Pittsburgh	2	–	14	.125	10	–	20	.333
Boston College	2	–	14	.125	7	–	23	.233
Clemson	1	–	15	.063	11	–	19	.367
† 2018 ACC tournament winner * Tournament #1 seed As of 31 March 2018; Rankings from AP poll

The 2017–18 Clemson Tigers women's basketball team represented Clemson University during the 2017–18 college basketball season. The Tigers, were led by fifth year head coach Audra Smith. The Tigers, members of the Atlantic Coast Conference, played their home games at Littlejohn Coliseum. The Tigers finished the season 1–15 in ACC play, in last place in the conference regular season. The Tigers were the 15th seed in the ACC tournament. They lost in the first round to Georgia Tech.

Despite receiving a three-year contract extension during the preseason, it was announced on March 27 that head coach Audra Smith would not be returning to the program for the 2018–19 season.

== Roster ==
2017–18 Clemson Tigers women's basketball team
Players
Coaches

Pos.	#	Name	Height	Year	Previous school	Hometown
G/F	0	Nelly Perry	5 ft 10 in (1.78 m)	Sr	Brimm Medical Arts	Camden, NJ
G	1	Destiny Thomas	5 ft 10 in (1.78 m)	Fr	Pelham	Pelham, GA
C	2	Jenise Strover	6 ft 2 in (1.88 m)	Fr	Mountain Pointe	Phoenix, AZ
G	5	Danielle Edwards	5 ft 7 in (1.7 m)	Jr	McDonogh School	Perry Hall, MD
G/F	10	Francesca Tagliapietra	5 ft 9 in (1.75 m)	RS Jr	Liceo Scientifico Nicolo' Tron	Carrè, Italy
F	11	Siana Fields	5 ft 8 in (1.73 m)	So	Long Beach Poly	Long Beach, CA
G	12	Aliyah Collier	5 ft 9 in (1.75 m)	Jr	Laney	Augusta, GA
G	15	Jaia Alexander	5 ft 9 in (1.75 m)	So	Roland Park Country	Towson, MD
C	20	Sirah Diarra	6 ft 2 in (1.88 m)	Jr	Champlain College Saint-Lambert	Longueuil, QE
G	22	Keniece Purvis	5 ft 7 in (1.7 m)	Jr	New Garden Friends School	Greensboro, NC
C	24	Ivy Atkism	6 ft 2 in (1.88 m)	Sr	George Walton Academy	Monroe, GA
F	32	Chyna Cotton	6 ft 0 in (1.83 m)	So	Southwest Atlanta Christian	Monroe, GA
G	33	Alexis Carter	5 ft 7 in (1.7 m)	Sr	Tigard	Portland, OR
C	44	Kobi Thornton	6 ft 2 in (1.88 m)	So	Randolph-Clay	Cuthbert, GA
C	55	Tylar Bennett	6 ft 4 in (1.93 m)	Fr	Detroit Country Day	Redford, MI

Head coach

- Audra Smith (Virginia)

Assistant coach(es)

- Daryl Oliver (Richmond)
- Edgar Farmer (North Carolina)
- Tiffany Sardin (Virginia)

Legend

- (C) Team captain
- (S) Suspended
- (I) Ineligible
- (W) Walk-on
- Injured
- Current redshirt

Roster

== Schedule ==
Date time, TV	Rank^{#}	Opponent^{#}	Result	Record	High points	High rebounds	High assists	Site (attendance) city, state
Exhibition
October 29*; 2:00 pm		North Greenville	W 67–39		13 – Edwards	6 – Tied	5 – Edwards	Littlejohn Coliseum; Clemson, SC
November 5*; 5:00 pm		Belmont Abbey	W 56–47		17 – Edwards	9 – Thornton	3 – Thomas	Littlejohn Coliseum; Clemson, SC
Non-conference regular season
November 10*; 11:00 am, ACCN Extra		Kennesaw State	W 41–28	1–0	7 – Edwards	2 – Tied	3 – Alexander	Littlejohn Coliseum (692); Clemson, SC
November 13*; 7:00 pm, ACCN Extra		South Carolina State	W 56–48	2–0	18 – Thornton	6 – Tied	4 – Tagliapietra	Littlejohn Coliseum (478); Clemson, SC
November 16*; 7:00 pm		No. 4 South Carolina; Rivalry	L 36–66	2–1	8 – Thornton	10 – Thornton	2 – Tied	Littlejohn Coliseum (1,589); Clemson, SC
November 19*; 2:00 pm		Monmouth	W 57–54	3–1	16 – Edwards	8 – Thornton	3 – Edwards	Littlejohn Coliseum (708); Clemson, SC
November 23*; 6:30 pm, ACCN Extra		vs. Detroit Mercy; San Juan Shootout	W 72–44	4–1	12 – Thomas	8 – Strover	2 – 3 Tied	Ocean Center (150); Daytona Beach, FL
November 24*; 6:30 pm		vs. Buffalo; San Juan Shootout	L 41–61	4–2	11 – Collier	7 – Thornton	2 – Alexander	Ocean Center (175); Daytona Beach, FL
November 30*; 8:00 pm, BTN Plus		at Nebraska; ACC-Big Ten Challenge	W 67–66	5–2	33 – Edwards	7 – Thornton	4 – Collier	Pinnacle Bank Arena (3,579); Lincoln, NE
December 2*; 2:00 pm, ACCN Extra		Charleston Southern	W 66–30	6–2	10 – Edwards	14 – Thornton	2 – Tied	Littlejohn Coliseum (552); Clemson, SC
December 4*; 7:30 pm		at Louisiana Tech	W 55–47	7–2	13 – Edwards	8 – Thornton	3 – Edwards	Thomas Assembly Center (2,129); Ruston, LA
December 8*; 7:00 pm, ACCN Extra		Prairie View A&M	W 64–58	8–2	22 – Alexander	10 – Thornton	4 – Collier	Littlejohn Coliseum (392); Clemson, SC
December 17*; 2:00 pm, ACCN Extra		Jacksonville State	W 53–45	9–2	12 – Carter	5 – Diarra	3 – Tied	Littlejohn Coliseum (738); Clemson, SC
December 20*; 1:00 pm, ESPN3		vs. Central Arkansas; FIU Holiday Tournament	L 47–53	9–3	16 – Collier	9 – Thornton	2 – Edwards	FIU Arena (284); Miami, FL
December 21*; 2:00 pm		vs. FIU; FIU Holiday Tournament	W 67–65	10–3	16 – Edwards	7 – Thomas	5 – Carter	FIU Arena (281); Miami, FL
ACC regular season
December 31; 2:00 pm, ACCN Extra		at Georgia Tech	L 33–66	10–4 (0–1)	10 – Thornton	9 – Bennett	3 – Edwards	McCamish Pavilion (1,191); Atlanta, GA
January 4; 7:00 pm, ACCN Extra		No. 11 Florida State	L 47–69	10–5 (0–2)	16 – Carter	3 – 5 Tied	4 – Carter	Littlejohn Coliseum (589); Clemson, SC
January 7; 2:00 pm, ACCN Extra		at Virginia	L 41–70	10–6 (0–3)	12 – Carter	5 – Tied	4 – Edwards	John Paul Jones Arena (3,995); Charlottesville, VA
January 11; 7:00 pm, ACCN Extra		at North Carolina	L 52–59	10–7 (0–4)	19 – Carter	13 – Alexander	4 – Edwards	Carmichael Arena (2,239); Chapel Hill, NC
January 14; 2:00 pm, ACCN Extra		Miami (FL)	L 60–72	10–8 (0–5)	18 – Tied	9 – Thornton	4 – Edwards	Littlejohn Coliseum (830); Clemson, SC
January 18; 7:00 pm, ACCN Extra		Boston College	W 65–61 ^{2OT}	11–8 (1–5)	19 – Alexander	10 – Thornton	5 – Edwards	Littlejohn Coliseum (599); Clemson, SC
January 21; 1:00 pm, ACCN Extra		at No. 5 Notre Dame	L 37–90	11–9 (1–6)	16 – Thornton	10 – Thornton	4 – Carter	Edmund P. Joyce Center (8,479); South Bend, IN
January 25; 7:00 pm, ACCN Extra		Syracuse	L 51–86	11–10 (1–7)	20 – Thornton	7 – Carter	3 – Tied	Carrier Dome (1,264); Syracuse, NY
January 28; 3:00 pm, RSN		NC State	L 41–62	11–11 (1–8)	12 – Thornton	8 – Thornton	2 – Edwards	Littlejohn Coliseum (1,343); Clemson, SC
February 1; 7:00 pm, ACCN Extra		Pittsburgh	L 42–58	11–12 (1–9)	15 – Thornton	10 – Edwards	2 – Tied	Littlejohn Coliseum (675); Clemson, SC
February 4; 2:00 pm, ACCN Extra		Georgia Tech	L 48–60	11–13 (1–10)	12 – Thornton	4 – 3 Tied	3 – Edwards	Littlejohn Coliseum (947); Clemson, SC
February 7; 7:00 pm, ACCN Extra		at No. 4 Louisville	L 46–65	11–14 (1–11)	13 – Thornton	10 – Collier	3 – Edwards	KFC Yum! Center (7,014); Louisville, KY
February 11; 2:00 pm, ACCN Extra		No. 19 Duke	L 35–60	11–15 (1–12)	11 – Collier	7 – Collier	2 – Carter	Littlejohn Coliseum (829); Clemson, SC
February 15; 7:00 pm, ACCN Extra		at No. 12 Florida State	L 43–91	11–16 (1–13)	17 – Thornton	6 – Tied	3 – Thomas	Donald L. Tucker Civic Center (3,102); Tallahassee, FL
February 18; 2:00 pm, ACCN Extra		at Virginia Tech	L 45–53	11–17 (1–14)	14 – Thornton	10 – Thornton	2 – Tied	Cassell Coliseum (2,425); Blacksburg, VA
February 22; 7:00 pm, ACCN Extra		Wake Forest	L 55–61	11–18 (1–15)	17 – Tied	11 – Thornton	6 – Carter	Littlejohn Coliseum (709); Clemson, SC
ACC Women's Tournament
February 28, 2018; 3:30 pm, ACCN Extra	(15)	vs. (10) Georgia Tech; First Round	L 52–61	11–19	13 – Tied	13 – Thornton	4 – Edwards	Greensboro Coliseum (3,134); Greensboro, NC
*Non-conference game. ^{#}Rankings from AP Poll. (#) Tournament seedings in parentheses. All times are in Eastern.

== Rankings ==
Regular season polls
Poll	Pre- Season	Week 2	Week 3	Week 4	Week 5	Week 6	Week 7	Week 8	Week 9	Week 10	Week 11	Week 12	Week 13	Week 14	Week 15	Week 16	Week 17	Week 18	Final
AP																			
Coaches																			

Legend
	Increase in ranking
	Decrease in ranking
	Not ranked previous week
(RV)	Received Votes

== See also ==
- 2017–18 Clemson Tigers men's basketball team
