= 2018 ACC women's basketball tournament =

- Classification: Division I
- Season: 2017–18
- Teams: 15
- Site: Greensboro Coliseum; Greensboro, NC
- Champions: Louisville (1st title)
- Winning coach: Jeff Walz (1st title)
- MVP: Myisha Hines-Allen (Louisville)
- Television: ESPN2, ESPNU, ACCRSN

2017–18 ACC women's basketball standings
| | Conf. | | | | Overall |
| Team | W | | L | PCT | W | | L | PCT |
|---|---|---|---|---|---|---|---|---|
| No. 3 Louisville *† | 15 | – | 1 | .938 | 36 | – | 3 | .923 |
| No. 5 Notre Dame | 15 | – | 1 | .938 | 35 | – | 3 | .921 |
| No. 11 Florida State | 12 | – | 4 | .750 | 26 | – | 7 | .788 |
| No. 21 NC State | 11 | – | 5 | .688 | 26 | – | 9 | .743 |
| No. 20 Duke | 11 | – | 5 | .688 | 24 | – | 9 | .727 |
| Syracuse | 10 | – | 6 | .625 | 22 | – | 9 | .710 |
| Miami (FL) | 10 | – | 6 | .625 | 21 | – | 11 | .656 |
| Virginia | 10 | – | 6 | .625 | 19 | – | 14 | .576 |
| Virginia Tech | 6 | – | 10 | .375 | 23 | – | 14 | .622 |
| Georgia Tech | 6 | – | 10 | .375 | 20 | – | 14 | .588 |
| Wake Forest | 5 | – | 11 | .313 | 14 | – | 17 | .452 |
| North Carolina | 4 | – | 12 | .250 | 15 | – | 16 | .484 |
| Pittsburgh | 2 | – | 14 | .125 | 10 | – | 20 | .333 |
| Boston College | 2 | – | 14 | .125 | 7 | – | 23 | .233 |
| Clemson | 1 | – | 15 | .063 | 11 | – | 19 | .367 |
† 2018 ACC tournament winner * Tournament #1 seed As of 31 March 2018; Rankings from AP poll

The 2018 ACC women's basketball tournament, which ended the 2017–18 season of the Atlantic Coast Conference, was held at Greensboro Coliseum in Greensboro, North Carolina, from February 28–March 4, 2018. Louisville, which finished atop the ACC regular-season table along with Notre Dame, won the tournament and with it the ACC's automatic bid to the 2018 NCAA Women's Division I Basketball Tournament.

== Seeds ==
| Seed | School | Conference record | Overall record | Tiebreaker |
|---|---|---|---|---|
| 1 | Louisville^{‡†} | 15–1 | 29–2 | 1–0 vs. Notre Dame |
| 2 | Notre Dame^{‡†} | 15–1 | 27–2 | 0–1 vs. Louisville |
| 3 | Florida State^{†} | 12–4 | 24–5 | |
| 4 | Duke^{†} | 11–5 | 22–7 | 1-0 vs. NC State |
| 5 | NC State^{#} | 11–5 | 22–7 | 0–1 vs. Duke |
| 6 | Miami^{#} | 10–6 | 20–9 | 1–0 vs. Virginia and 1–0 vs. Syracuse |
| 7 | Virginia^{#} | 10–6 | 17–12 | 0–1 vs. Miami and 1–0 vs. Syracuse |
| 8 | Syracuse^{#} | 10–6 | 22–7 | 0–1 vs. Miami and 0-1 vs. Virginia |
| 9 | Virginia Tech^{#} | 6–10 | 17–12 | 1–0 vs. Georgia Tech |
| 10 | Georgia Tech | 6–10 | 17–12 | 0–1 vs. Georgia Tech |
| 11 | Wake Forest | 5–11 | 13–16 | |
| 12 | North Carolina | 4–12 | 14–15 | |
| 13 | Boston College | 2–14 | 10–19 | 1–0 vs. Pittsburgh |
| 14 | Pittsburgh | 2–14 | 7–22 | 0–1 vs. Boston College |
| 15 | Clemson | 1–15 | 11–18 | |
‡ – ACC regular season co-champions. † – Received a double-bye in the conference tournament. # – Received a single-bye in the conference tournament. Overall records include all games played in the ACC Tournament.

== Schedule ==
| Game | Time* | Matchup^{#} | Television | Attendance |
First round – Wednesday, February 28
| 1 | 1:00 pm | #12 North Carolina vs. #13 Boston College | ACCRSN | 3,134 |
| 2 | 3:30 pm | #10 Georgia Tech vs. #15 Clemson | ACCRSN | 3,134 |
| 3 | 6:30 pm | #11 Wake Forest vs. #14 Pittsburgh | ACCRSN | 2,810 |
Second round – Thursday, March 1
| 4 | 11:00 am | #5 NC State vs. #12 North Carolina | ACCRSN | 6,168 |
| 5 | 2:00 pm | #8 Syracuse vs. #9 Virginia Tech | ACCRSN | 2,886 |
| 6 | 6:00 pm | #7 Virginia vs. #10 Georgia Tech | ACCRSN | 4,008 |
| 7 | 8:00 pm | #6 Miami vs. #11 Wake Forest | ACCRSN | 4,008 |
Quarterfinals – Friday, March 2
| 8 | 11:00 am | #4 Duke vs. #5 NC State | ACCRSN | 5,613 |
| 9 | 2:00 pm | #1 Louisville vs. #9 Virginia Tech | ACCRSN | 3,297 |
| 10 | 6:00 pm | #2 Notre Dame vs. #7 Virginia | ACCRSN | 4,316 |
| 11 | 8:00 pm | #3 Florida State vs. #6 Miami | ACCRSN | 4,316 |
Semifinals – Saturday, March 3
| 12 | Noon | #5 NC State vs. #1 Louisville | ESPNU | 6,160 |
| 13 | 2:30 pm | #2 Notre Dame vs #3 Florida State | ESPNU | 6,160 |
Championship – Sunday, March 4
| 14 | 2:00 pm | #1 Louisville vs #2 Notre Dame | ESPN2 | 7,424 |
*Game times in ET. # – Rankings denote tournament seed

== Bracket ==
First round Wednesday, February 28; ACCRSN
12 | North Carolina | 69
13 | Boston College | 64
10 | Georgia Tech | 61
15 | Clemson | 52
11 | Wake Forest | 72
14 | Pittsburgh | 38

Second round Thursday, March 1 ACCRSN
8 | Syracuse | 70
9 | Virginia Tech | 85
5 | NC State | 77
12 | North Carolina | 64
7 | Virginia | 60
10 | Georgia Tech | 58
6 | Miami | 68
11 | Wake Forest | 60

Quarterfinals; Friday, March 2 ACCRSN
1 | Louisville | 73
9 | Virginia Tech | 70
4 | Duke | 45
5 | NC State | 51
2 | Notre Dame | 83
7 | Virginia | 47
3 | Florida State | 73
6 | Miami | 69

Semifinals; Saturday, March 3 ESPNU
1 | Louisville | 64
5 | NC State | 59
2 | Notre Dame | 90
3 | Florida State | 80

Championship; Sunday, March 4 ESPN2
1 | Louisville | 74
2 | Notre Dame | 72

== See also ==
- 2018 ACC men's basketball tournament
