= 2017–18 Miami Hurricanes women's basketball team =

Intercollegiate basketball season

2017–18 Miami Hurricanes women's basketball

NCAA Women's Tournament, first round
- Conference: Atlantic Coast Conference
- Record: 21–11 (10–6 ACC)
- Head coach: Katie Meier (13th season)
- Assistant coaches: Octavia Blue; Tia Jackson; Fitzroy Anthony
- Home arena: Watsco Center

2017–18 ACC women's basketball standings
	Conf.				Overall
Team	W		L	PCT	W		L	PCT
No. 3 Louisville *†	15	–	1	.938	36	–	3	.923
No. 5 Notre Dame	15	–	1	.938	35	–	3	.921
No. 11 Florida State	12	–	4	.750	26	–	7	.788
No. 21 NC State	11	–	5	.688	26	–	9	.743
No. 20 Duke	11	–	5	.688	24	–	9	.727
Syracuse	10	–	6	.625	22	–	9	.710
Miami (FL)	10	–	6	.625	21	–	11	.656
Virginia	10	–	6	.625	19	–	14	.576
Virginia Tech	6	–	10	.375	23	–	14	.622
Georgia Tech	6	–	10	.375	20	–	14	.588
Wake Forest	5	–	11	.313	14	–	17	.452
North Carolina	4	–	12	.250	15	–	16	.484
Pittsburgh	2	–	14	.125	10	–	20	.333
Boston College	2	–	14	.125	7	–	23	.233
Clemson	1	–	15	.063	11	–	19	.367
† 2018 ACC tournament winner * Tournament #1 seed As of 31 March 2018; Rankings from AP poll

The 2017–18 Miami hurricanes women's basketball team represented the University of Miami during the 2017–18 NCAA Division I women's basketball season. The Hurricanes, led by thirteenth-year head coach Katie Meier, played their home games at the Watsco Center and were members of the Atlantic Coast Conference. They finished the season 21–11, 10–6 in ACC play to finish in a three-way tie for sixth place. They advanced to the quarterfinals of the ACC women's tournament, where they lost to Florida State. They received an at-large bid to the NCAA women's tournament, where they lost in the rematch of last year's second round to Quinnipiac in the first round.

== Roster ==
2017–18 Miami Hurricanes women's basketball team
Players
Coaches

Pos.	#	Name	Height	Year	Previous school	Hometown
F	0	Keyanna Harris	6 ft 0 in (1.83 m)	Sr	William T. Dwyer	Palm Beach Gardens, FL
G	1	Laura Cornelius	5 ft 8 in (1.73 m)	Jr	Caland Lyceum	Groningen, Netherlands
G	3	Endia Banks	5 ft 9 in (1.75 m)	Fr	Duluth	Duluth, GA
G	4	Shaneese Bailey	5 ft 9 in (1.75 m)	RS Sr	University Christian School; Florida Atlantic	Callahan, FL
G	5	Mykea Gray	5 ft 4 in (1.63 m)	RS Fr	National Christian Academy	Atlanta, GA
G/F	12	Sarah Mortensen	6 ft 1 in (1.85 m)	So	Long Island Lutheran	Copenhagen, Denmark
G	13	Taylor Mason	5 ft 9 in (1.75 m)	Fr	Norcross	Decatur, GA
G	15	Neydja Petithomme	5 ft 8 in (1.73 m)	Sr	Grandview Prep; Auburn	Boca Raton, FL
G	20	Kelsey Marshall	5 ft 8 in (1.73 m)	Fr	Miami Country Day School	Davie, FL
F/C	21	Emese Hof	6 ft 3 in (1.91 m)	Jr	Caland Lyceum	Utrecht, Netherlands
G/F	23	Rebecca Ripley	6 ft 0 in (1.83 m)	Fr	New Hampton School	Stratham, NH
F	25	Khaila Prather	6 ft 1 in (1.85 m)	Sr	Riverdale Baptist	Upper Marlboro, MD
F/C	30	Erykah Davenport	6 ft 2 in (1.88 m)	Sr	Tucker	Tucker, GA
F	32	Beatrice Mompremier	6 ft 4 in (1.93 m)	Jr	Miami Senior; Baylor	Miami, FL
C	51	Serena-Lynn Geldof	6 ft 6 in (1.98 m)	So	KA Redingenhof Leuven	Ostend, Belgium

Head coach

- Katie Meier (Duke)

Assistant coach(es)

- Octavia Blue (Miami (FL))
- Tia Jackson (Iowa)
- Fitzroy Anthony (Palm Beach Atlantic)

Legend

- (C) Team captain
- (S) Suspended
- (I) Ineligible
- (W) Walk-on
- Injured
- Current redshirt

Roster
Last update: February 21, 2018

== Schedule ==
Date time, TV	Rank^{#}	Opponent^{#}	Result	Record	Site (attendance) city, state
Exhibition
October 31, 2017*; 7:00 pm, ACCN Extra		Nova Southeastern	W 102–47		Watsco Center (812); Coral Gables, FL
Non-conference regular season
November 10, 2017*; 6:00 pm, ACCN Extra		FIU	W 77–69	1–0	Watsco Center (1,073); Coral Gables, FL
November 12, 2017*; 2:00 pm, ACCN Extra		Vermont	W 73–49	2–0	Watsco Center (777); Coral Gables, FL
November 18, 2017*; 3:00 pm, Pac–12 Plus		at Colorado	L 61–67	2–1	Coors Events Center (1,450); Boulder, CO
November 21, 2017*; 11:00 am, ACCN Extra		New Orleans	W 76–46	3–1	Watsco Center (2,005); Coral Gables, FL
November 24, 2017*; 4:00 pm, ACCN Extra		Maine; Miami Thanksgiving Tournament	W 80–73	4–1	Watsco Center (713); Coral Gables, FL
November 26, 2017*; 12:00 pm, ACCN Extra		No. 15 Maryland; Miami Thanksgiving Tournament	L 71–79	4–2	Watsco Center (884); Coral Gables, FL
November 30, 2017*; 1:00 pm, ACCN Extra		Michigan State; ACC–Big Ten Women's Challenge	W 67–57	5–2	Watsco Center (1,062); Coral Gables, FL
December 3, 2017*; 1:00 pm, ACCN Extra		St. John's	L 64–74	5–3	Watsco Center (809); Coral Gables, FL
December 10, 2017*; 1:00 pm, ACCN Extra		No. 20 Kentucky	W 65–54	6–3	Watsco Center (868); Coral Gables, FL
December 15, 2017*; 7:00 pm, ACCN Extra		Alabama State	W 73–31	7–3	Watsco Center (929); Coral Gables, FL
December 18, 2017*; 3:30 pm		vs. Sacramento State; Puerto Rico Classic	W 82–56	8–3	Coliseo Rubén Zayas Montañez (105); Trujillo Alto, PR
December 20, 2017*; 1:00 pm		vs. Southern Illinois; Puerto Rico Classic	W 75–65	9–3	Coliseo Rubén Zayas Montañez (116); Trujillo Alto, PR
December 28, 2017*; 7:00 pm		Bethune–Cookman	W 85–39	10–3	Watsco Center (793); Coral Gables, FL
ACC regular season
December 31, 2017; 12:30 pm, RSN		No. 14 Duke	W 51–48	11–3 (1–0)	Watsco Center (878); Coral Gables, FL
January 4, 2018; 7:00 pm, ACCN Extra		at No. 2 Notre Dame	L 76–83	11–4 (1–1)	Purcell Pavilion (7,828); South Bend, IN
January 7, 2018; 12:00 pm, ACCN Extra		Wake Forest	L 50–61	11–5 (1–2)	Watsco Center (1,138); Coral Gables, FL
January 11, 2018; 7:00 pm, RSN		at No. 13 Florida State	L 67–105	11–6 (1–3)	Donald L. Tucker Civic Center (3,281); Tallahassee, FL
January 14, 2018; 2:00 pm, ACCN Extra		at Clemson	W 72–60	12–6 (2–3)	Littlejohn Coliseum (830); Clemson, SC
January 18, 2018; 7:00 pm, RSN		Syracuse	W 72–67	13–6 (3–3)	Watsco Center (631); Coral Gables, FL
January 21, 2018; 1:00 pm, ACCN Extra		at Boston College	W 65–43	14–6 (4–3)	Conte Forum (1,232); Chestnut Hill, MA
January 25, 2018; 11:00 am, ACCN Extra		Louisville	L 74–84	14–7 (4–4)	Watsco Center (2,706); Coral Gables, FL
January 28, 2018; 2:00 pm, ACCN Extra		at Virginia Tech	W 82–78	15–7 (5–4)	Cassell Coliseum (2,878); Blacksburg, VA
February 4, 2018; 2:00 pm, ACCN Extra		at North Carolina	W 92–72	16–7 (6–4)	Carmichael Arena (3,549); Chapel Hill, NC
February 8, 2018; 7:00 pm, ACCN Extra		No. 23 NC State	W 52–48	17–7 (7–4)	Watsco Center (786); Coral Gables, FL
February 11, 2018; 4:00 pm, ESPN2		No. 12 Florida State	L 71–91	17–8 (7–5)	Watsco Center (2,527); Coral Gables, FL
February 15, 2018; 7:00 pm, ACCN Extra		Pittsburgh	W 82–58	18–8 (8–5)	Watsco Center (840); Coral Gables, FL
February 18, 2018; 12:30 pm, RSN		at Virginia	W 77–62	19–8 (9–5)	John Paul Jones Arena (3,890); Charlottesville, VA
February 22, 2018; 7:00 pm, ACCN Extra		at Georgia Tech	L 51–70	19–9 (9–6)	McCamish Pavilion (1,476); Atlanta, GA
February 25, 2018; 4:00 pm, RSN		Virginia Tech	W 76–46	20–9 (10–6)	Watsco Center (1,165); Coral Gables, FL
ACC Women's Tournament
March 1, 2018; 8:00 pm, ACCN Extra	(6)	vs. (11) Wake Forest; Second Round	W 68–60	21–9	Greensboro Coliseum (4,008); Greensboro, NC
March 2, 2018; 8:00 pm, ACCN Extra	(6)	vs. (3) No. 11 Florida State; Quarterfinals	L 69–73	21–10	Greensboro Coliseum (4,316); Greensboro, NC
NCAA Women's Tournament
March 17, 2018*; 1:30 pm, ESPN2	(8 A)	vs. (9 A) Quinnipiac; First Round	L 72–86	21–11	Harry A. Gampel Pavilion (6,154); Storrs, CT
*Non-conference game. ^{#}Rankings from AP Poll. (#) Tournament seedings in parentheses. A=Albany. All times are in Eastern.

== Rankings ==
Regular season polls
Poll	Pre- Season	Week 2	Week 3	Week 4	Week 5	Week 6	Week 7	Week 8	Week 9	Week 10	Week 11	Week 12	Week 13	Week 14	Week 15	Week 16	Week 17	Week 18	Week 19	Final
AP	RV	RV							RV						RV	RV	RV	RV		N/A
Coaches	24	24	RV	RV		RV	RV		RV	RV		RV	RV	RV	RV	RV	RV	RV	RV	RV

Legend
	Increase in ranking
	Decrease in ranking
	Not ranked previous week
(RV)	Received votes
