= 2017–18 Syracuse Orange women's basketball team =

Intercollegiate basketball season

2017–18 Syracuse Orange women's basketball

Paradise Jam Tournament Reef Division champions

NCAA tournament, first round
- Conference: Atlantic Coast Conference
- Record: 22–9 (10–6 ACC)
- Head coach: Quentin Hillsman (11th season)
- Assistant coaches: Vonn Read; Tammi Reiss; Adeniyi Amadou
- Home arena: Carrier Dome

2017–18 ACC women's basketball standings
	Conf.				Overall
Team	W		L	PCT	W		L	PCT
No. 3 Louisville *†	15	–	1	.938	36	–	3	.923
No. 5 Notre Dame	15	–	1	.938	35	–	3	.921
No. 11 Florida State	12	–	4	.750	26	–	7	.788
No. 21 NC State	11	–	5	.688	26	–	9	.743
No. 20 Duke	11	–	5	.688	24	–	9	.727
Syracuse	10	–	6	.625	22	–	9	.710
Miami (FL)	10	–	6	.625	21	–	11	.656
Virginia	10	–	6	.625	19	–	14	.576
Virginia Tech	6	–	10	.375	23	–	14	.622
Georgia Tech	6	–	10	.375	20	–	14	.588
Wake Forest	5	–	11	.313	14	–	17	.452
North Carolina	4	–	12	.250	15	–	16	.484
Pittsburgh	2	–	14	.125	10	–	20	.333
Boston College	2	–	14	.125	7	–	23	.233
Clemson	1	–	15	.063	11	–	19	.367
† 2018 ACC tournament winner * Tournament #1 seed As of 31 March 2018; Rankings from AP poll

The 2017–18 Syracuse Orange women's basketball team represented Syracuse University during the 2017–18 NCAA Division I women's basketball season. The Orange, led by eleventh-year head coach Quentin Hillsman. The Orange were fifth-year members of the Atlantic Coast Conference and played their home games at the Carrier Dome. They finished the season 22–9, 10–6 in ACC play to finish in a three-way tie for sixth place. They lost in the second round of the ACC women's tournament to Virginia Tech. They received an at-large bid to the NCAA women's tournament, where they lost to Oklahoma State in the first round.

== Roster ==
2017–18 Syracuse Orange women's basketball team
Players
Coaches

Pos.	#	Name	Height	Year	Previous school	Hometown
G	1	Raven Fox	5 ft 8 in (1.73 m)	Fr	Elizabeth Seton	Bladensburg, MD
G	2	Chelayne Bailey	5 ft 6 in (1.68 m)	So	Pickering	Pickering, ON
F	3	Maeva Djaldi–Tabdi	6 ft 2 in (1.88 m)	Fr	Jean Moulin	Paris, France
G	4	Tiana Mangakahia	5 ft 6 in (1.68 m)	So	Lake Ginninderra	Meadowbrook, QLD, Australia
F	10	Marie–Paule Foppossi	6 ft 1 in (1.85 m)	Fr	Lycée Marcelin Berthelot	Strasbourg, France
G	11	Gabrielle Cooper	5 ft 10 in (1.78 m)	So	Morgan Park	Lansing, IL
G	12	Kiara Lewis	5 ft 8 in (1.73 m)	So	Whitney Young	Chicago, IL
G	14	Nikki Oppenheimer	5 ft 9 in (1.75 m)	Fr	Montini Catholic	Glenview, IL
G	20	Marisa Romeo	5 ft 9 in (1.75 m)	RS Sr	Christian Brothers Academy	Syracuse, NY
G	21	Desiree Elmore	5 ft 9 in (1.75 m)	So	Capital Prep	Hartford, CT
C	22	Amaya Finklea–Guity	6 ft 4 in (1.93 m)	Fr	Noble & Greenough	Dorchester, MA
G	23	Isis Young	5 ft 7 in (1.7 m)	RS Jr	Life Center Academy	Berlin, NJ
G	24	Brandi Fowler	5 ft 4 in (1.63 m)	Jr	Corcoran	Syracuse, NY
F	32	Miranda Drummond	6 ft 1 in (1.85 m)	RS Jr	Harpursville; St. Bonaventure	Binghamton, NY
G	34	Abby Grant	5 ft 9 in (1.75 m)	Jr	St. Francis	Suwanee, GA
F	45	Digna Strautmane	6 ft 2 in (1.88 m)	Fr	Riga 66	Riga, Latvia

Head coach

- Quentin Hillsman (St. Mary's (MD))

Assistant coach(es)

- Vonn Read (Clark Atlanta)
- Adeniyi Amadou (Indiana (PA))
- Tammi Reiss (Virginia)

Legend

- (C) Team captain
- (S) Suspended
- (I) Ineligible
- (W) Walk-on
- Injured
- Current redshirt

Roster

== Schedule ==
Date time, TV	Rank^{#}	Opponent^{#}	Result	Record	Site (attendance) city, state
Non-conference regular season
November 10, 2017*; 2:00 pm, ACCN Extra		Morgan State	W 95–68	1–0	Carrier Dome (1,234); Syracuse, NY
November 16, 2017*; 7:00 pm, ACCN Extra		Maryland Eastern Shore	W 68–45	2–0	Carrier Dome (1,221); Syracuse, NY
November 20, 2017*; 11:00 am, ACCN Extra		Hartford	W 75–63	3–0	Carrier Dome (5,144); Syracuse, NY
November 23, 2017*; 11:00 am		vs. Wisconsin; Paradise Jam Tournament Reef Division	W 77–74	4–0	Charles E. Smith Center; Washington, D.C.
November 24, 2017*; 3:30 pm		vs. Vanderbilt; Paradise Jam Tournament Reef Division	W 84–78	5–0	Charles E. Smith Center (933); Washington, D.C.
November 25, 2017*; 3:30 pm		vs. George Washington; Paradise Jam Tournament Reef Division	W 74–62	6–0	Charles E. Smith Center (788); Washington, D.C.
November 30, 2017*; 7:00 pm, ACCN Extra		Northwestern; ACC–Big Ten Women's Challenge	W 81–74	7–0	Carrier Dome (1,167); Syracuse, NY
December 3, 2017*; 2:00 pm, ACCN Extra		Stony Brook	W 81–70 ^{OT}	8–0	Carrier Dome (1,617); Syracuse, NY
December 6, 2017*; 7:00 pm, ACCN Extra		Colgate	W 79–39	9–0	Carrier Dome (1,131); Syracuse, NY
December 9, 2017*; 6:00 pm, ACCN Extra		Drexel	W 72–62	10–0	Carrier Dome (1,471); Syracuse, NY
December 17, 2017*; 6:30 pm		vs. Coastal Carolina; Carolinas Challenge	W 69–57	11–0	Myrtle Beach Convention Center; Myrtle Beach, SC
December 21, 2017*; 5:30 pm		vs. No. 5 Mississippi State; Duel in the Desert	L 65–76	11–1	Cox Pavilion; Paradise, NV
December 22, 2017*; 5:30 pm		at UNLV; Duel in the Desert	W 69–55	12–1	Cox Pavilion; Paradise, NV
ACC regular season
December 28, 2017; 7:00 pm, ACCN Extra		at No. 2 Notre Dame	L 72–87	12–2 (0–1)	Purcell Pavilion (8,288); South Bend, IN
December 31, 2017; 2:00 pm, ACCN Extra		at Virginia	L 63–68	12–3 (0–2)	John Paul Jones Arena (2,979); Charlottesville, VA
January 4, 2018; 7:00 pm, ACCN Extra		Georgia Tech	W 88–77	13–3 (1–2)	Carrier Dome (1,231); Syracuse, NY
January 7, 2018; 1:00 pm, RSN		No. 11 Florida State	W 76–69	14–3 (2–2)	Carrier Dome (1,803); Syracuse, NY
January 14, 2018; 2:00 pm, ACCN Extra		at NC State	L 56–60	14–4 (2–3)	Reynolds Coliseum (2,855); Raleigh, NC
January 18, 2018; 7:00 pm, RSN		at Miami (FL)	L 67–72	14–5 (2–4)	Watsco Center (631); Coral Gables, FL
January 21, 2018; 2:00 pm, ACCN Extra		Pittsburgh	W 70–52	15–5 (3–4)	Carrier Dome (8,126); Syracuse, NY
January 25, 2018; 7:00 pm, ACCN Extra		Clemson	W 86–51	16–5 (4–4)	Carrier Dome (1,264); Syracuse, NY
January 28, 2018; 1:00 pm, ACCN Extra		at Boston College	W 75–57	17–5 (5–4)	Conte Forum (1,817); Chestnut Hill, MA
February 1, 2018; 7:00 pm, ACCN Extra		Virginia Tech	L 64–73	17–6 (5–5)	Carrier Dome (1,416); Syracuse, NY
February 4, 2018; 1:00 pm, ACCN Extra		No. 4 Louisville	L 77–84	17–7 (5–6)	Carrier Dome (2,575); Syracuse, NY
February 11, 2018; 7:00 pm, ACCN Extra		Wake Forest	W 71–61	18–7 (6–6)	LJVM Coliseum (1,097); Winston–Salem, NC
February 15, 2018; 2:00 pm, RSN		No. 17 Duke	W 68–65	19–7 (7–6)	Carrier Dome (2,666); Syracuse, NY
February 19, 2018; 7:00 pm, RSN		at Pittsburgh	W 62–53	20–7 (8–6)	Peterson Events Center (638); Pittsburgh, PA
February 22, 2018; 7:00 pm, ACCN Extra		at North Carolina	W 86–80	21–7 (9–6)	Carmichael Arena (2,357); Chapel Hill, NC
February 25, 2018; 2:00 pm, ACCN Extra		Boston College	W 69–63	22–7 (10–6)	Carrier Dome (3,196); Syracuse, NY
ACC Women's Tournament
March 1, 2018*; 2:00 pm, ACCN Extra	(8)	vs. (9) Virginia Tech; Second Round	L 70–85	22–8	Greensboro Coliseum (2,886); Greensboro, NC
NCAA Women's Tournament
March 17, 2018*; 3:30 pm, ESPN2	(8 KC)	vs. (9 KC) Oklahoma State; First Round	L 57–84	22–9	Humphrey Coliseum; Starkville, MS
*Non-conference game. ^{#}Rankings from AP Poll. (#) Tournament seedings in parentheses. KC=Kansas City Region. All times are in Eastern.

== Rankings ==
Regular season polls
Poll	Pre- season	Week 2	Week 3	Week 4	Week 5	Week 6	Week 7	Week 8	Week 9	Week 10	Week 11	Week 12	Week 13	Week 14	Week 15	Week 16	Week 17	Week 18	Week 19	Final
AP	RV	RV		RV	RV	RV	RV	RV	RV	RV	RV		RV			RV	RV			N/A
Coaches	RV	RV	RV	25	24	23	22	23	RV	RV	RV	RV	RV	RV	RV	24	23	RV	RV	RV

Legend
	Increase in ranking
	Decrease in ranking
	Not ranked previous week
(RV)	Received votes

== See also ==
- 2017–18 Syracuse Orange men's basketball team
