= 2017–18 North Carolina Tar Heels women's basketball team =

Intercollegiate basketball season

2017–18 North Carolina Tar Heels women's basketball
- Conference: Atlantic Coast Conference
- Record: 15–16 (4–12 ACC)
- Head coach: Sylvia Hatchell (32nd season)
- Assistant coaches: Andrew Calder; Tracey Williams-Johnson; Sylvia Crawley
- Home arena: Carmichael Arena

2017–18 ACC women's basketball standings
	Conf.				Overall
Team	W		L	PCT	W		L	PCT
No. 3 Louisville *†	15	–	1	.938	36	–	3	.923
No. 5 Notre Dame	15	–	1	.938	35	–	3	.921
No. 11 Florida State	12	–	4	.750	26	–	7	.788
No. 21 NC State	11	–	5	.688	26	–	9	.743
No. 20 Duke	11	–	5	.688	24	–	9	.727
Syracuse	10	–	6	.625	22	–	9	.710
Miami (FL)	10	–	6	.625	21	–	11	.656
Virginia	10	–	6	.625	19	–	14	.576
Virginia Tech	6	–	10	.375	23	–	14	.622
Georgia Tech	6	–	10	.375	20	–	14	.588
Wake Forest	5	–	11	.313	14	–	17	.452
North Carolina	4	–	12	.250	15	–	16	.484
Pittsburgh	2	–	14	.125	10	–	20	.333
Boston College	2	–	14	.125	7	–	23	.233
Clemson	1	–	15	.063	11	–	19	.367
† 2018 ACC tournament winner * Tournament #1 seed As of 31 March 2018; Rankings from AP poll

The 2017–18 North Carolina Tar Heels women's basketball team represented the University of North Carolina at Chapel Hill during the 2017–18 NCAA Division I women's basketball season. The Tar Heels, led by thirty-second-year head coach Sylvia Hatchell, played their games at Carmichael Arena and were members of the Atlantic Coast Conference. They finished the season 15–16, 4–12 in ACC play in twelfth place. They defeated Boston College in the first round before losing in the second round of the ACC women's tournament to NC State.

== Roster ==
2017–18 North Carolina Tar Heels women's basketball team
Players
Coaches

Pos.	#	Name	Height	Year	Previous school	Hometown
G	1	Taylor Koenen	6 ft 2 in (1.88 m)	So	Shakopee	Savage, MN
G	4	Jocelyn Jones	6 ft 0 in (1.83 m)	RS Fr	Cosby	Richmond, VA
G	5	Stephanie Watts	5 ft 11 in (1.8 m)	Jr	Weddington	Wesley Chapel, NC
G	10	Jamie Cherry	5 ft 8 in (1.73 m)	Sr	West Craven	Cove City, NC
F	11	Emily Sullivan	6 ft 4 in (1.93 m)	So	Reitz Memorial	Newburgh, IN
G	13	Dazia Powell	5 ft 10 in (1.78 m)	RS Fr	Millbrook	Raleigh, NC
G	14	Liz Roberts (W)	5 ft 8 in (1.73 m)	So	Durham Academy	Chapel Hill, NC
G	15	Olivia Smith	6 ft 0 in (1.83 m)	So	Cardinal Gibbons	Raleigh, NC
G	20	Leah Church	5 ft 8 in (1.73 m)	Fr	Forest Trail Academy	Purlear, NC
G	22	Paris Kea	5 ft 9 in (1.75 m)	RS Jr	Page; Vanderbilt	Greenboro, NC
G	24	Destinee Walker	5 ft 10 in (1.78 m)	So	Lake Highland Prep	Ocoee, FL
F	30	Jaelynn Murray	6 ft 2 in (1.88 m)	Fr	Dreher	Columbia, SC
C	34	Naomi Van Nes	6 ft 6 in (1.98 m)	So	Hamden Country Day	Dorchester, England
C	44	Janelle Bailey	6 ft 4 in (1.93 m)	Fr	Providence Day School	Matthews, NC

Head coach

- Sylvia Hatchell (Carson–Newman)

Assistant coach(es)

- Andrew Calder (Coker)
- Tracey Williams-Johnson (UNC Pembroke)
- Sylvia Crawley (North Carolina)

Legend

- (C) Team captain
- (S) Suspended
- (I) Ineligible
- (W) Walk-on
- Injured
- Current redshirt

Roster
Last update: February 20, 2018

== Schedule ==
Date time, TV	Rank^{#}	Opponent^{#}	Result	Record	Site (attendance) city, state
Exhibition
November 1, 2017*; 6:00 pm, ACCN Extra		Wingate	W 84–62		Carmichael Arena; Chapel Hill, NC
November 6, 2017*; 6:00 pm, ACCN Extra		Mount Olive	W 102–47		Carmichael Arena; Chapel Hill, NC
Non-conference regular season
November 10, 2017*; 3:30 pm, ACCN Extra		Hampton	L 66–70	0–1	Carmichael Arena (1,965); Chapel Hill, NC
November 12, 2017*; 2:00 pm, ACCN Extra		Colorado	W 87–80 ^{OT}	1–1	Carmichael Arena (2,181); Chapel Hill, NC
November 16, 2017*; 6:00 pm, ACCN Extra		Radford	W 79–46	2–1	Carmichael Arena (2,250); Chapel Hill, NC
November 19, 2017*; 3:00 pm, ACCN Extra		South Alabama	L 84–85	2–2	Carmichael Arena (2,380); Chapel Hill, NC
November 22, 2017*; 2:00 pm, ACCN Extra		UNC Wilmington	W 86–60	3–2	Carmichael Arena (2,823); Chapel Hill, NC
November 29, 2017*; 3:30 pm, ACCN Extra		Minnesota; ACC–Big Ten Women's Challenge	W 88–83	4–2	Carmichael Arena (2,315); Chapel Hill, NC
December 1, 2017*; 3:00 pm, ACCN Extra		Hartford	W 90–70	5–2	Carmichael Arena (1,960); Chapel Hill, NC
December 3, 2017*; 5:30 pm, ACCN Extra		Appalachian State	W 56–43	6–2	Carmichael Arena (2,617); Chapel Hill, NC
December 5, 2017*; 6:00 pm, ACCN Extra		Presbyterian	W 91–56	7–2	Carmichael Arena (2,304); Chapel Hill, NC
December 10, 2017*; 2:00 pm, ACCN Extra		Furman	W 84–56	8–2	Carmichael Arena (2,268); Chapel Hill, NC
December 17, 2017*; 4:00 pm, Stadium		vs. Washington; Carolina's Challenge	W 90–78	9–2	Myrtle Beach Convention Center (500); Myrtle Beach, SC
12/20/2016*; 2:00 pm		vs. Grambling State; Carolina's Challenge	W 79–63	10–2	Myrtle Beach Convention Center (500); Myrtle Beach, SC
December 28, 2017*; 2:00 pm, ACCN Extra		Mercer	L 86–97	10–3	Carmichael Arena (2,988); Chapel Hill, NC
ACC regular season
December 31, 2017; 2:00 pm, ACCN Extra		at No. 13 Florida State	L 65–103	10–4 (0–1)	Donald L. Tucker Center (3,219); Tallahassee, FL
January 5, 2018; 11:00 am, ACCN Extra		at Boston College	L 64–77	10–5 (0–2)	Conte Forum (747); Chestnut Hill, MA
January 7, 2018; 2:00 pm, ACCN Extra		Pittsburgh	W 68–67	11–5 (1–2)	Carmichael Arena (2,325); Chapel Hill, NC
January 11, 2018; 7:00 pm, ACCN Extra		Clemson	W 59–52	12–5 (2–2)	Carmichael Arena (2,239); Chapel Hill, NC
January 14, 2018; 12:30 pm, ACCN Extra		at Wake Forest	W 79–76 ^{OT}	13–5 (3–2)	LJVM Coliseum (937); Winston–Salem, NC
January 18, 2018; 7:00 pm, ACCN Extra		NC State; Rivalry	W 66–53	13–6 (3–3)	Carmichael Arena (2,037); Chapel Hill, NC
January 21, 2018; 2:30 pm, ACCN Extra		No. 15 Duke; Rivalry	W 92–86 ^{OT}	14–6 (4–3)	Carmichael Arena (4,634); Chapel Hill, NC
November 25, 2018; 7:00 pm, ACCN Extra		at Virginia	L 70–82	14–7 (4–4)	John Paul Jones Arena (2,971); Charlottesville, VA
February 1, 2018; 7:00 pm, ACCN Extra		at No. 5 Notre Dame	L 62–94	14–8 (4–5)	Edmund P. Joyce Center (7,617); South Bend, IN
February 4, 2018; 2:00 pm, ACCN Extra		Miami	L 72–92	14–9 (4–6)	Carmichael Arena (3,549); Chapel Hill, NC
February 7, 2018; 7:00 pm, ACCN Extra		Virginia Tech	L 74–90	14–10 (4–7)	Carmichael Arena (2,744); Chapel Hill, NC
February 11, 2018; 3:00 pm, ACCN Extra		at No. 20 NC State; Rivalry	L 54–73	14–11 (4–8)	Reynolds Coliseum (5,500); Raleigh, NC
February 15, 2018; 7:00 pm, ACCN Extra		at Georgia Tech	L 61–79	14–12 (4–9)	McCamish Pavilion (1,122); Atlanta, GA
November 18, 2018; 2:30 pm, ACCN Extra		No. 4 Louisville	L 57–67	14–13 (4–10)	Carmichael Arena (3,934); Chapel Hill, NC
February 22, 2018; 7:00 pm, ACCN Extra		Syracuse	L 80–86	14–14 (4–11)	Carmichael Arena (2,357); Chapel Hill, NC
February 25, 2018; 2:00 pm, ACCN Extra		at No. 20 Duke; Rivalry	L 54–70	14–15 (4–12)	Cameron Indoor Stadium (9,314); Durham, NC
ACC Women's Tournament
February 28, 2018; 1:00 pm, ACCN Extra	(12)	vs. (13) Boston College; First Round	W 69–64	15–15	Greensboro Coliseum; Greensboro, NC
March 1, 2018; 11:00 am, ACCN Extra	(12)	vs. (5) No. 23 NC State; Second Round	L 64–77	15–16	Greensboro Coliseum (6,164); Greensboro, NC
*Non-conference game. ^{#}Rankings from AP Poll. (#) Tournament seedings in parentheses. All times are in Eastern.

== Rankings ==
Regular season polls
Poll	Pre- season	Week 2	Week 3	Week 4	Week 5	Week 6	Week 7	Week 8	Week 9	Week 10	Week 11	Week 12	Week 13	Week 14	Week 15	Week 16	Week 17	Week 18	Week 19	Final
AP																				
Coaches																				

Legend
	Increase in ranking
	Decrease in ranking
	Not ranked previous week
(RV)	Received votes

== See also ==
- 2017–18 North Carolina Tar Heels men's basketball team
