= 2017–18 Louisville Cardinals women's basketball team =

Intercollegiate basketball season

2017–18 Louisville Cardinals women's basketball

ACC tournament champions ACC regular season co-champions Preseason WNIT champions

NCAA tournament, Final Four
- Conference: Atlantic Coast Conference

Ranking
- Coaches: No. 4
- AP: No. 3
- Record: 36–3 (15–1 ACC)
- Head coach: Jeff Walz (11th season)
- Assistant coaches: Stephanie Norman; Samantha Williams; Sam Purcell
- Home arena: KFC Yum! Center

2017–18 ACC women's basketball standings
	Conf.				Overall
Team	W		L	PCT	W		L	PCT
No. 3 Louisville *†	15	–	1	.938	36	–	3	.923
No. 5 Notre Dame	15	–	1	.938	35	–	3	.921
No. 11 Florida State	12	–	4	.750	26	–	7	.788
No. 21 NC State	11	–	5	.688	26	–	9	.743
No. 20 Duke	11	–	5	.688	24	–	9	.727
Syracuse	10	–	6	.625	22	–	9	.710
Miami (FL)	10	–	6	.625	21	–	11	.656
Virginia	10	–	6	.625	19	–	14	.576
Virginia Tech	6	–	10	.375	23	–	14	.622
Georgia Tech	6	–	10	.375	20	–	14	.588
Wake Forest	5	–	11	.313	14	–	17	.452
North Carolina	4	–	12	.250	15	–	16	.484
Pittsburgh	2	–	14	.125	10	–	20	.333
Boston College	2	–	14	.125	7	–	23	.233
Clemson	1	–	15	.063	11	–	19	.367
† 2018 ACC tournament winner * Tournament #1 seed As of 31 March 2018; Rankings from AP poll

The 2017–18 Louisville Cardinals women's basketball team represented the University of Louisville during the 2017–18 NCAA Division I women's basketball season. The Cardinals, led by 11th-year head coach Jeff Walz, played their home games at the KFC Yum! Center in their fourth year in the Atlantic Coast Conference. They finished the season 36–3, 15–1 in ACC play to win a share of the regular season title. They defeated Virginia Tech, NC State, and Notre Dame to win the ACC women's tournament. As a result, they received the conference's automatic bid to the NCAA women's tournament. As the No. 1 seed in the Lexington region, they defeated Boise State and Marquette to advance to the Sweet Sixteen. There they defeated Stanford and Oregon State in the Elite Eight to advance to the school's third Final Four. In the Final Four, they lost to Mississippi State in overtime.

== Previous season ==
The Cardinals finished the 2016–17 season at 29–8, 12–4 in ACC play to finish in a tie for fourth place. They advanced to the semifinals of the ACC women's tournament where they lost to Notre Dame. They received an at-large bid for the NCAA women's tournament and advanced to the Sweet Sixteen where they lost to Baylor.

== Roster ==
2017–18 Louisville Cardinals women's basketball team
Players
Coaches

Pos.	#	Name	Height	Year	Previous school	Hometown
G	1	Dana Evans	5 ft 6 in (1.68 m)	Fr	West Side Leadership Academy	Gary, IN
F	2	Myisha Hines-Allen	6 ft 2 in (1.88 m)	Sr	Montclair	Montclair, NJ
F	3	Sam Fuehring	6 ft 3 in (1.91 m)	Jr	Immaculate Conception	Wanaque, NJ
G	10	Sydney Zambrotta	5 ft 9 in (1.75 m)	So	Christ the King	North Babylon, NY
G	11	Arica Carter	5 ft 8 in (1.73 m)	RS Jr	Lloyd C. Bird	Long Beach, CA
G	12	Lindsey Duvall	5 ft 9 in (1.75 m)	Fr	Bullitt East	Mount Washington, KY
F	21	Kylee Shook	6 ft 4 in (1.93 m)	So	Mesa Ridge	Colorado Springs, CO
G	23	Jazmine Jones	6 ft 0 in (1.83 m)	So	Florida A&M Developmental	Tallahassee, FL
G	24	Jessica Laemmle	5 ft 2 in (1.57 m)	So	Mercy Academy	Louisville, KY
G	25	Asia Durr	5 ft 10 in (1.78 m)	Jr	St. Pius X Catholic	Douglasville, GA
C	32	Loretta Kakala	6 ft 2 in (1.88 m)	Fr	Manteca	Manteca, CA
F	33	Bionca Dunham	6 ft 2 in (1.88 m)	So	Imhotep Institute Charter	Philadelphia, PA

Head coach

- Jeff Walz (Northern Kentucky)

Assistant coach(es)

- Stephanie Norman (Arizona State)
- Samantha Williams (Auburn)
- Sam Purcell (Auburn)

Legend

- (C) Team captain
- (S) Suspended
- (I) Ineligible
- (W) Walk-on
- Injured
- Current redshirt

Roster

== Rankings ==
Regular season ranking movement Legend: ██ Increase in ranking. ██ Decrease in ranking. ██ Not ranked the previous week. RV=Received votes.
Poll	Pre- Season	Week 2	Week 3	Week 4	Week 5	Week 6	Week 7	Week 8	Week 9	Week 10	Week 11	Week 12	Week 13	Week 14	Week 15	Week 16	Week 17	Week 18	Week 19	Final
AP	9	5	4	4	4	4	3	3	3	3	2	4	4	4	4	4	4	3	3	N/A
Coaches	10	N/A	7	5	5	4	4	4	4	4	2	4	4	4	5	5	5	3	3	4

== Schedule and results ==
Date time, TV	Rank^{#}	Opponent^{#}	Result	Record	Site (attendance) city, state
Regular season
Nov 10, 2017*; 7:00 pm, ACCN Extra	No. 9	Southeast Missouri State; Preseason WNIT First Round	W 80–40	1–0	KFC Yum! Center (6,054); Louisville, KY
Nov 12, 2017*; 4:00 pm, ESPNU	No. 9	vs. No. 5 Ohio State; Countdown to Columbus	W 95–90 ^{OT}	2–0	Nationwide Arena (9,711); Columbus, OH
Nov 14, 2017*; 7:00 pm, ACCN Extra	No. 5	Toledo; Preseason WNIT Quarterfinals	W 90–55	3–0	KFC Yum! Center (7,444); Louisville, KY
Nov 16, 2017*; 7:00 pm, ACCN Extra	No. 5	No. 25 Michigan; Preseason WNIT Semifinals	W 74–49	4–0	KFC Yum! Center (5,651); Louisville, KY
Nov 19, 2017*; 3:00 pm, CBSSN	No. 5	No. 10 Oregon; Preseason WNIT Championship	W 74–61	5–0	KFC Yum! Center (6,162); Louisville, KY
Nov 24, 2017*; 1:00 pm, ACCN Extra	No. 4	Murray State	W 115–51	6–0	KFC Yum! Center (6,881); Louisville, KY
Nov 30, 2017*; 8:00 pm, BTN	No. 4	at Indiana; ACC–Big Ten Women's Challenge	W 72–59	7–0	Simon Skjodt Assembly Hall (2,853); Bloomington, IN
Dec 03, 2017*; 3:00 pm	No. 4	at South Dakota State	W 68–64	8–0	Frost Arena (2,506); Brookings, SD
Dec 05, 2017*; 7:00 pm, ACCN Extra	No. 4	UT Martin	W 91–56	9–0	KFC Yum! Center (6,279); Louisville, KY
Dec 07, 2017*; 7:00 pm, ACCN Extra	No. 4	Vanderbilt	W 79–57	10–0	KFC Yum! Center (6,132); Louisville, KY
Dec 09, 2017*; 7:00 pm, ACCN Extra	No. 4	Middle Tennessee	W 80–26	11–0	KFC Yum! Center (6,752); Louisville, KY
Dec 12, 2017*; 7:00 pm, ACCN Extra	No. 3	Tennessee State	W 95–56	12–0	KFC Yum! Center (5,782); Louisville, KY
Dec 17, 2017*; 3:00 pm, SECN	No. 3	at Kentucky; The Battle for the Bluegrass	W 87–63	13–0	Memorial Coliseum (5,871); Lexington, KY
Dec 20, 2017*; 3:00 pm	No. 3	at Air Force	W 62–50	14–0	Clune Arena (537); Colorado Springs, CO
Dec 28, 2017; 7:00 pm, ACCN Extra	No. 3	at Georgia Tech	W 74–71	15–0 (1–0)	McCamish Pavilion (1,473); Atlanta, GA
Dec 31, 2017; 2:30 pm, FS Regional	No. 3	at NC State	W 55–47	16–0 (2–0)	Reynolds Coliseum (2,865); Raleigh, NC
Jan 04, 2018; 7:00 pm, ACCN Extra	No. 3	No. 17 Duke	W 66–60	17–0 (3–0)	KFC Yum! Center (8,101); Louisville, KY
Jan 7, 2018; 2:00 pm, ACCN Extra	No. 3	Virginia Tech	W 67–56	18–0 (4–0)	KFC Yum! Center (7,523); Louisville, KY
Jan 11, 2018; 7:00 pm, ESPN	No. 3	No. 2 Notre Dame	W 100–67	19–0 (5–0)	KFC Yum! Center (12,614); Louisville, KY
Jan 18, 2018; 7:00 pm, ACCN Extra	No. 2	at Pittsburgh	W 77–51	20–0 (6–0)	Petersen Events Center (441); Pittsburgh, PA
Jan 21, 2018; 5:00 pm, ESPN2	No. 2	No. 12 Florida State	L 49–50	20–1 (6–1)	KFC Yum! Center (14,248); Louisville, KY
Jan 25, 2018; 11:00 am, ACCN Extra	No. 4	at Miami (FL)	W 84–74	21–1 (7–1)	Watsco Center (2,706); Coral Gables, FL
Jan 28, 2018; 1:00 pm, RSN	No. 4	Wake Forest	W 89–52	22–1 (8–1)	KFC Yum! Center (10,139); Louisville, KY
Feb 01, 2018; 7:00 pm, RSN	No. 4	at Virginia	W 77–41	23–1 (9–1)	John Paul Jones Arena (2,877); Charlottesville, VA
Feb 04, 2018; 1:00 pm, ACCN Extra	No. 4	at Syracuse	W 84–77	24–1 (10–1)	Carrier Dome (2,575); Syracuse, NY
Feb 09, 2018; 7:00 pm, ACCN Extra	No. 4	Clemson	W 65–48	25–1 (11–1)	KFC Yum! Center (7,014); Louisville, KY
Feb 12, 2018*; 7:00 pm, ESPN2	No. 4	at No. 1 Connecticut	L 58–69	25–2 (11–1)	Harry A. Gampel Pavilion (10,167); Storrs, CT
Feb 15, 2018; 7:00 pm, ACCN Extra	No. 4	at Boston College	W 87–52	26–2 (12–1)	Conte Forum (929); Chestnut Hill, MA
Feb 18, 2018; 2:30 pm, RSN	No. 4	at North Carolina	W 67–57	27–2 (13–1)	Carmichael Arena (3,934); Chapel Hill, NC
Feb 22, 2018; 7:00 pm, ACCN Extra	No. 4	Virginia	W 51–39	28–2 (14–1)	KFC Yum! Center (8,434); Louisville, KY
Feb 25, 2018; 2:00 pm, ACCN Extra	No. 4	Pittsburgh	W 81–49	29–2 (15–1)	KFC Yum! Center (10,431); Louisville, KY
ACC Women's Tournament
Mar 02, 2018; 2:00 pm, ACCN Extra	(1) No. 4	vs. (9) Virginia Tech; Quarterfinals	W 73–70	30–2	Greensboro Coliseum (3,297); Greensboro, NC
Mar 03, 2018; 12:00 pm, ESPNU	(1) No. 4	vs. (5) No. 23 NC State; Semifinals	W 64–59	31–2	Greensboro Coliseum; Greensboro, NC
Mar 04, 2018; 2:00 pm, ESPN2	(1) No. 4	vs. (2) No. 5 Notre Dame; Championship	W 74–72	32–2	Greensboro Coliseum (7,424); Greensboro, NC
NCAA Women's Tournament
Mar 16, 2018*; 12:00 pm, ESPN2	(1 L) No. 3	(16 L) Boise State; First Round	W 74–42	33–2	KFC Yum! Center; Louisville, KY
Mar 18, 2018*; 12:00 pm, ESPN2	(1 L) No. 3	(8 L) Marquette; Second Round	W 90–72	34–2	KFC Yum! Center (8,017); Louisville, KY
Mar 23, 2018*; 9:00 pm, ESPN	(1 L) No. 3	vs. (4 L) No. 15 Stanford; Sweet Sixteen	W 86–59	35–2	Rupp Arena (5,715); Lexington, KY
Mar 25, 2018*; 12:00 pm, ESPN	(1 L) No. 3	vs. (6 L) No. 13 Oregon State; Elite Eight	W 76–43	36–2	Rupp Arena (6,268); Lexington, KY
Mar 30, 2018*; 7:00 pm, ESPN2	(1 L) No. 3	vs. (1 KC) No. 4 Mississippi State; Final Four	L 63–73 ^{OT}	36–3	Nationwide Arena (19,564); Columbus, OH
*Non-conference game. ^{#}Rankings from AP Poll. (#) Tournament seedings in parentheses. L=Lexington Region. All times are in Eastern.
