= 2019–20 WABA League Regular season =

The WABA League is a top-level regional basketball league, featuring female teams from Serbia, Montenegro, Bosnia and Herzegovina, Bulgaria, Slovenia and Croatia. In the Regular season was played with 10 teams and play a dual circuit system, each with each one game at home and away. The four best teams at the end of the regular season were placed in the Final Four. The regular season began on 2 October 2019 and it will end on 4 March 2020.

== Standings ==
Pos	Team	Pld	W	L	PF	PA	PD	Pts	Qualification or relegation
1	(Montenegro) Budućnost Bemax	18	15	3	1340	1021	+319	33	Advance to the Final Four
2	(Slovenia) Cinkarna Celje	18	14	4	1471	1171	+300	32	Advance to the Final Four
3	(Bulgaria) Montana 2003	18	13	5	1354	1203	+151	31	Advance to the Final Four
4	(Bulgaria) Beroe (-1)	18	14	4	1444	1193	+251	32	Advance to the Final Four
5	(Serbia) Kraljevo	18	11	7	1413	1305	+108	29	
6	(Bosnia and Herzegovina) RMU Banovići	18	5	13	1288	1479	−191	23	
7	(Serbia) Partizan 1953	18	5	13	1173	1434	−261	23	
8	(Serbia) Crvena zvezda Kombank (-1)	18	5	13	1151	1313	−162	23	
9	(Bosnia and Herzegovina) Orlovi	18	4	14	1192	1429	−237	22	
10	(Croatia) Trešnjevka 2009	18	4	14	1204	1482	−278	22	

Updated to match(es) played on March 5, 2020. Source: WABA League

== Fixtures and results ==
All times given below are in Central European Time (for the matches played in Bulgaria is time expressed in Eastern European Time).

=== Game 1 ===
2 October 2019
17:30

Report

Kraljevo	78–78	Beroe
Scoring by quarter: 22:27, 24:17, 17:14, 12:20
Pts: Hill 18; Rebs: Račić 9 Asts: Ristić 7		Pts: Lee 18; Rebs: Adams 10; Asts: Konstantinova 3

Sports Hall, Kraljevo
Attendance: 500
Referees: Lakićević, Kuburović, Cetković

2 October 2019
18:30

Report

Crvena zvezda Kombank	74–59	RMU Banovići
Scoring by quarter: 17:12, 20:17, 20:18, 17:12
Pts: Janković 17; Rebs: I. Katanić 12; Asts: I. Katanić 9		Pts: Marković 13; Rebs: Marković 13; Asts: Gilbert, Vrančić 4

Basket City, Belgrade
Attendance: 100
Referees: Holjevac, Grubišić, Pencinger

2 October 2019
15:30

Report

Partizan 1953	62–48	Orlovi
Scoring by quarter: 13:14, 18:4, 14:10, 17:20
Pts: Mitrović 18; Rebs: Marjanović 11; Asts: Mitrović, Inđić 7		Pts: Rajić 12; Rebs: Rajić 10; Asts: Morrison 2

Vizura Sport, Belgrade
Attendance: 100
Referees: Hartman, Barišić, Kelava

2 October 2019
18:30

Report

Montana 2003	80–54	Trešnjevka 2009
Scoring by quarter: 26:15, 11:11, 30:10, 13:18
Pts: Tavić 15; Rebs: Natskina, Georgieva 5 Asts: Tavić 5		Pts: Turkalj 20; Rebs: Pavić 8 Asts: Mühl 5

Mladost, Montana
Attendance: 500
Referees: Miloradović, Pešić, Vlahović

2 October 2019
18:00

Report

Cinkarna Celje	72–45	Budućnost Bemax
Scoring by quarter: 16:9, 19:13, 18:9, 19:14
Pts: Krošelj 19; Rebs: Kostourkova 8 Asts: Krošelj, Keys 4		Pts: Džebo 11; Rebs: Đorđević 9 Asts: A. Katanić 4

Hall Gimnazija Center Celje, Celje
Attendance: 200
Referees: Adamović, Vavan, Rađević

=== Game 2 ===
9 October 2019
18:00

Report

Beroe	71–59	Budućnost Bemax
Scoring by quarter: 23:20, 12:13, 15:14, 21:12
Pts: Adams, Lee 15; Rebs: Adams 12; Asts: Kocheva 8		Pts: Mitrašinović, Džebo 12; Rebs: Đorđević 6 Asts: Babić, Džebo 4

Municipal Hall, Stara Zagora
Attendance: 180
Referees: Vesković, Milojević, Miloradović

9 October 2019
18:30

Report

Trešnjevka 2009	59–85	Cinkarna Celje
Scoring by quarter: 16:19, 16:21, 15:25, 12:20
Pts: Pavić 16; Rebs: Pavić 12; Asts: Mühl 10		Pts: Keys 17; Rebs: Keys 9 Asts: Keys 5

Dom sportova 2, Zagreb
Attendance: 30
Referees: Bajgorić, Hasić, Bambur

9 October 2019
17:00

Report

Orlovi	63–82	Montana 2003
Scoring by quarter: 19:21, 14:22, 10:28, 20:11
Pts: Nikpaljević 28; Rebs: Nikpaljević 9 Asts: Gligić 6		Pts: Trebec 20; Rebs: Georgieva 7 Asts: Tavić 7

Obilićevo, Banja Luka
Attendance: 100
Referees: Javor, Klemen Dovč, Krebs

8 October 2019
18:00

Report

RMU Banovići	80–61	Partizan 1953
Scoring by quarter: 22:13, 22:13, 21:15, 15:20
Pts: Gilbert, Marković 15; Rebs: Marković 14; Asts: Vrančić 8		Pts: Stojanović 12; Rebs: Marjanović 6 Asts: Marjanović 5

SKC Banovići, Banovići
Attendance: 100
Referees: Holjevac, Grubišić, Hartman

9 October 2019
17:30

Report

Kraljevo	81–71	Crvena zvezda Kombank
Scoring by quarter: 25:14, 26:19, 15:16, 15:22
Pts: Hill 16; Rebs: Hawkins 7 Asts: Hill 9		Pts: I. Katanić 25; Rebs: Bojović 8 Asts: I. Katanić 6

Sports Hall, Kraljevo
Attendance: 500
Referees: Vuković, Popović, Bajrović

=== Game 3 ===
16 October 2019
18:30

Report

Crvena zvezda Kombank	63–74	Beroe
Scoring by quarter: 22:18, 13:27, 14:18, 14:11
Pts: Bojović 15; Rebs: I. Katanić 7 Asts: Mandić 4		Pts: Dineva 21; Rebs: Lee 6 Asts: Konstantinova 8

Basket City, Belgrade
Attendance: 100
Referees: Nožinović, Ališehović, Kasumović

16 October 2019
15:30

Report

Partizan 1953	77–88	Kraljevo
Scoring by quarter: 21:26, 21:32, 12:15, 23:15
Pts: Mitrović 21; Rebs: Marjanović 10; Asts: Mitrović 3		Pts: Denise Hill 23; Rebs: Gobeljić 10; Asts: Denise Hill 10

Vizura Sport, Belgrade
Attendance: 100
Referees: Čalić, Sedlar, Jovičin

16 October 2019
18:30

Report

Montana 2003	86–84	RMU Banovići
Scoring by quarter: 23:23, 25:19, 21:20, 17:22
Pts: Ivanova 27; Rebs: Georgieva 17; Asts: Tavić 7		Pts: Gilbert 24; Rebs: Marković 10; Asts: Ikanović 9

Mladost Hall, Montana
Attendance: 600
Referees: Pešić, Vlahović, Matić

15 October 2019
18:00

Report

Cinkarna Celje	119–64	Orlovi
Scoring by quarter: 40:11, 28:19, 24:15, 27:19
Pts: Hersler 28; Rebs: Kostourkova 16; Asts: Debeljak 5		Pts: Nikpaljević 16; Rebs: Gligić 6 Asts: Rajić 5

Hall Gimnazija Center Celje, Celje
Attendance: 100
Referees: Jež, Šonjić, Ekart

17 October 2019
19:00

Report

Budućnost Bemax	106–49	Trešnjevka 2009
Scoring by quarter: 34:7, 32:13, 22:18, 18:11
Pts: Leković 17; Rebs: Živković 5 Asts: Babić 5		Pts: Pavić 18; Rebs: Pavić 10; Asts: Savić 3

Bemax Arena, Podgorica
Attendance: 1200
Referees: Lasetović, Nikšić, Kadrić

=== Game 4 ===
23 October 2019
18:00

Report

Beroe	103–59	Trešnjevka 2009
Scoring by quarter: 30:12, 31:20, 21:17, 21:10
Pts: Adams 30; Rebs: Adams 13; Asts: Kocheva 14		Pts: Mühl 16; Rebs: Mühl 6 Asts: Mühl 5

Municipal Hall, Stara Zagora
Attendance: 200
Referees: Čalić, Krstić, Živković

23 October 2019
19:00

Report

Orlovi	61–100	Budućnost Bemax
Scoring by quarter: 12:32, 14:19, 14:24, 21:25
Pts: Nikpaljević 24; Rebs: Rajić 7 Asts: Božić, Rajić 3		Pts: three players 20; Rebs: Bura, Džebo 6 Asts: Mitrašinović 6

Obilićevo, Banja Luka
Attendance: 150
Referees: Mauer, Dovč, Krebs

23 October 2019
18:00

Report

RMU Banovići	83–93	Cinkarna Celje
Scoring by quarter: 15:24, 14:21, 23:32, 31:16
Pts: Musić 31; Rebs: Marković 13; Asts: Vrančić 8		Pts: three players 17; Rebs: Keys 10; Asts: Deer, Keys 4

SKC Banovići, Banovići
Attendance: 300
Referees: Holjevac, Hartman, Barišić

22 October 2019
17:30

Report

Kraljevo	84–72	Montana 2003
Scoring by quarter: 20:20, 19:19, 28:16, 17:17
Pts: Račić 24; Rebs: Gobeljić 15; Asts: Bajić 5		Pts: Ivanova 17; Rebs: Stoycheva, Dimitrova 5 Asts: Tavić 3

Sports Hall, Kraljevo
Attendance: 500
Referees: M. Lakićević, I. Lakićević, Kuburović

23 October 2019
19:00

Report

Crvena zvezda Kombank	83–85	Partizan 1953
Scoring by quarter: 24:19, 30:18, 18:24, 11:24
Pts: I. Katanić, Mandić 21; Rebs: Janković 8 Asts: Mandić 11		Pts: Mitrović 23; Rebs: Inđić 10; Asts: Inđić 6

Basket City, Belgrade
Attendance: 100
Referees: Pešić, Marković, Vlahović

=== Game 5 ===
30 October 2019
15:30

Report

Partizan 1953	60–100	Beroe
Scoring by quarter: 10:25, 22:24, 17:28, 11:23
Pts: Mitrović 20; Rebs: Inđić 11; Asts: Stojanović 6		Pts: Adams 18; Rebs: Zlatanova 8 Asts: Dineva, Kocheva 6

Vizura Sport, Belgrade
Attendance: 40
Referees: N. Nikšić, T. Nikšić, Jurić

30 October 2019
18:30

Report

Montana 2003	82–71	Crvena zvezda Kombank
Scoring by quarter: 19:17, 28:13, 19:13, 16:28
Pts: Georgieva 19; Rebs: Georgieva 8 Asts: Tavić 11		Pts: Bojović 18; Rebs: Vulović 7 Asts: I. Katanić 6

Mladost hall, Montana
Attendance: 450
Referees: Holjevac, Jež, Ekart

30 October 2019
18:00

Report

Cinkarna Celje	71–65	Kraljevo
Scoring by quarter: 26:12, 21:18, 8:19, 16:16
Pts: Deer 24; Rebs: Keys 9 Asts: Deer 5		Pts: Račić 22; Rebs: Denise Hill 12; Asts: Denise Hill 7

Hall Gimnazija Center Celje, Celje
Attendance: 100
Referees: Adamović, Vavan, Rađević

31 October 2019
19:00

Report

Budućnost Bemax	87–76	RMU Banovići
Scoring by quarter: 25:12, 28:21, 23:22, 11:21
Pts: Džebo 22; Rebs: Babić 9 Asts: Babić 10		Pts: Jones 21; Rebs: Marković 7 Asts: Vrančić 9

Bemax Arena, Podgorica
Attendance: 500
Referees: Bajramović, Pepur, Strikić

31 October 2019
18:45

Report

Trešnjevka 2009	86–68	Orlovi
Scoring by quarter: 19:19, 28:15, 21:14, 18:20
Pts: Turkalj 18; Rebs: Pavić 16; Asts: Mühl 12		Pts: Nikpaljević 19; Rebs: Begenišić 7 Asts: Nikpaljević 5

Dom sportova 2, Zagreb
Attendance: 30
Referees: Gajšek, Dovč, Musić

=== Game 6 ===
6 November 2019
18:00

Report

Beroe	96–74	Orlovi
Scoring by quarter: 24:19, 29:21, 19:20, 24:14
Pts: Kocheva 19; Rebs: Zlatanova 13; Asts: Kocheva 7		Pts: Nikpaljević 36; Rebs: Nikpaljević 17; Asts: Gligić 6

Municipal Hall, Stara Zagora
Attendance: 130
Referees: Čalić, Marković, Dašić

6 November 2019
18:30

Report

RMU Banovići	75–74	Trešnjevka 2009
Scoring by quarter: 20:29, 21:9, 17:20, 17:16
Pts: Delić 19; Rebs: Marković 5 Asts: Vrančić 8		Pts: Katavić 18; Rebs: Mühl 8 Asts: Mühl 7

SKC Banovići, Banovići
Attendance: 100
Referees: Pecelj, Sedlar, Jovičin

8 November 2019
18:00

Report

Kraljevo	46–77	Budućnost Bemax
Scoring by quarter: 7:20, 15:18, 11:19, 13:20
Pts: Jovančević 13; Rebs: Gobeljić 7 Asts: Ristić 5		Pts: three players 14; Rebs: Jakšić 10; Asts: Mitrašinović 7

Sports Hall, Kraljevo
Attendance: 500
Referees: Bajgorić, Hasić, Bambur

6 November 2019
18:30

Report

Crvena zvezda Kombank	64–73	Cinkarna Celje
Scoring by quarter: 12:25, 25:23, 15:11, 12:14
Pts: Nedeljkov, Janković 12; Rebs: I. Katanić, Janković 5 Asts: Mandić 10		Pts: Keys 24; Rebs: Seničar 10; Asts: Deer 7

Basket City, Belgrade
Attendance: 100
Referees: Adamović, Babić, Skenderija

7 November 2019
15:30

Report

Partizan 1953	66–68	Montana 2003
Pts: Mitrović 18; Rebs: Radović 10; Asts: Inđić 5		Pts: Georgieva 16; Rebs: Georgieva 6 Asts: Tavić 7

Vizura Sport, Belgrade
Attendance: 150
Referees: Pencinger, Hartman, Barišić

=== Game 7 ===
27 November 2019
18:30

Report

Montana 2003	65–56	Beroe
Scoring by quarter: 18:13, 21:16, 13:10, 13:17
Pts: Georgieva 23; Rebs: Georgieva 13; Asts: Tavić 7		Pts: Lee 19; Rebs: Lee 13; Asts: Konstantinova 3

Mladost Hall, Montana
Attendance: 600
Referees: Pešic, Marković, Čalić

27 November 2019
18:00

Report

Cinkarna Celje	89–48	Partizan 1953
Scoring by quarter: 22:8, 26:13, 22:20, 19:7
Pts: Keys 23; Rebs: Hersler 10; Asts: Deer 7		Pts: Stojanović 12; Rebs: Inđić 10; Asts: Inđić 4

Hall Gimnazija Center Celje, Celje
Attendance: n/a
Referees: Glavurdić, Jež, Šonjić

26 November 2019
19:00

Report

Budućnost Bemax	81–49	Crvena zvezda Kombank
Scoring by quarter: 24:13, 19:16, 25:6, 13:14
Pts: Babić 16; Rebs: Bura 6 Asts: Babić 5		Pts: I. Katanić, Nedeljkov 14; Rebs: Mandić 5 Asts: I. Katanić 5

Bemax Arena, Podgorica
Attendance: 1500
Referees: N. Nikšić, T. Nikšić, Kadrić

28 November 2019
18:30

Report

Trešnjevka 2009	66–73 (OT)	Kraljevo
Scoring by quarter: 25:23, 9:18, 14:14, 14:7, Overtime: 4:11
Pts: Pavić 15; Rebs: Jurić 4 Asts: Galunić, Perić 4		Pts: Gobeljić 21; Rebs: Gobeljić 10; Asts: Denise Hill, Bajić 5

Sutinska vrela, Zagreb
Attendance: 100
Referees: Adamović, Skenderija, Dojčinović

27 November 2019
17:00

Report

Orlovi	86–91	RMU Banovići
Scoring by quarter: 23:35, 26:19, 17:14, 20:23
Pts: Nikpaljević 32; Rebs: Begenišić 12; Asts: Nikpaljević 6		Pts: Vrančić 26; Rebs: Marković 12; Asts: Vrančić 10

Obilićevo, Banja Luka
Attendance: 100
Referees: Vlahov, Karačić, Šutalo

=== Game 8 ===
4 December 2019
18:30

Report

Beroe	107–68	RMU Banovići
Scoring by quarter: 30:19, 29:10, 29:14, 19:25
Pts: Dineva 26; Rebs: Zlatanova 12; Asts: Kocheva 6		Pts: Vrančić 17; Rebs: Vrančić 6 Asts: Vrančić 13

Municipal Hall, Stara Zagora
Attendance: 250
Referees: Matić, Pešić, Vlahović

4 December 2019
17:30

Report

Kraljevo	83–49	Orlovi
Scoring by quarter: 30:10, 20:13, 24:14, 9:12
Pts: Denise Hill, Gobeljić 19; Rebs: Gobeljić, Jovančević 10; Asts: Bajić 8		Pts: Rajić 13; Rebs: Orašanin 7 Asts: Rajić, Gligić 2

Sports Hall, Kraljevo
Attendance: 500
Referees: Lakićević, Kuburović, Cetković

4 December 2019
20:00

Report

Crvena zvezda Kombank	89–61	Trešnjevka 2009
Scoring by quarter: 21:22, 11:15, 27:10, 30:14
Pts: I. Katanić, Mišeljić 15; Rebs: Mišeljić 5 Asts: I. Katanić 8		Pts: Ujević 13; Rebs: Majstorović 10; Asts: Majstorović 5

Basket City, Belgrade
Attendance: 50
Referees: Bajgorić, Hasić, Bambur

5 December 2019
15:30

Report

Partizan 1953	50–79	Budućnost Bemax
Scoring by quarter: 15:21, 14:16, 10:25, 11:17
Pts: Popović 9 Rebs: Jovanović, Inđić 4 Asts: Popović 4		Pts: Mitrašinović, Jakšić 13; Rebs: Đorđević 8 Asts: Babić 6

Vizura Sport, Belgrade
Attendance: 100
Referees: Holjevac, Grubišić, Pencinger

4 December 2019
18:30

Report

Montana 2003	84–79	Cinkarna Celje
Scoring by quarter: 17:26, 18:23, 22:13, 27:17
Pts: Trebec 35; Rebs: Georgieva 10; Asts: Tavić 14		Pts: Hersler, Keys 21; Rebs: Keys 9 Asts: Deer 12

Mladost Hall, Montana
Attendance: 400
Referees: Vesković, Miloradović, Čalić

=== Game 9 ===
11 December 2019
18:00

Report

Cinkarna Celje	80–64	Beroe
Scoring by quarter: 19:18, 18:16, 20:14, 23:16
Pts: Bogićević 20; Rebs: Keys 10; Asts: Deer 9		Pts: Dineva 18; Rebs: Zlatanova, Adams 10; Asts: Kocheva 5

Hall Gimnazija Center Celje, Celje
Attendance: 200
Referees: Adamović, Skenderija, Srdić

12 December 2019
19:00

Report

Budućnost Bemax	82–67	Montana 2003
Scoring by quarter: 13:10, 25:25, 18:17, 26:15
Pts: Babić, Džebo 24; Rebs: Jakšić 10; Asts: Babić 7		Pts: Trebec 23; Rebs: Trebec 6 Asts: Stoycheva 4

Bemax Arena, Podgorica
Attendance: 1500
Referees: Kralj, Komar, Kovačević

11 December 2019
17:00

Report

Trešnjevka 2009	92–81	Partizan 1953
Scoring by quarter: 23:19, 27:19, 21:10, 21:33
Pts: Katavić, Majstorović 17; Rebs: three players 7 Asts: Mühl 5		Pts: Marjanović 20; Rebs: Đoković, Marjanović 7 Asts: Popović 6

Sutinska vrela, Zagreb
Attendance: 50
Referees: Nikšić, Kadrić, Šehovič

11 December 2019
17:00

Report

Orlovi	76–64	Crvena zvezda Kombank
Scoring by quarter: 20:14, 16:23, 23:12, 17:15
Pts: Šobot 22; Rebs: Begenišić 15; Asts: Rajić 7		Pts: Janković 15; Rebs: Janković 10; Asts: I. Katanić 5

Obilićevo, Banja Luka
Attendance: 100
Referees: Gajšek, Kruljac, Copić

11 December 2019
18:30

Report

RMU Banovići	66–76	Kraljevo
Scoring by quarter: 18:22, 22:18, 9:16, 17:20
Pts: Marković 27; Rebs: Zeljković, Delić 7 Asts: Vrančić 7		Pts: Bajić 18; Rebs: Gobeljić, Pierre-Louis 9 Asts: Ristić 4

SKC Banovići, Banovići
Attendance: 300
Referees: Holjevac, Hartman, Barišić

=== Game 10 ===
18 December 2019
18:30

Report

Beroe	102–79	Kraljevo
Scoring by quarter: 27:14, 16:16, 30:21, 29:28
Pts: Dineva 21; Rebs: Lee 9 Asts: Ivanova 6		Pts: Gobeljić, Pierre-Louis 16; Rebs: Pierre-Louis 13; Asts: Hill 6

Municipal Hall, Stara Zagora
Attendance: 200
Referees: Petrović, Lazov, Jakova

18 December 2019
18:30

Report

RMU Banovići	69–64	Crvena zvezda Kombank
Scoring by quarter: 18:24, 20:12, 19:15, 12:13
Pts: Marković 22; Rebs: Marković 19; Asts: Zeljković, Ikanović 3		Pts: I. Katanić 16; Rebs: I. Katanić 14; Asts: Đokić 3

SKC Banovići, Banovići
Attendance: 100
Referees: Galić, Pavičić, Ekart

18 December 2019
17:00

Report

Orlovi	65–73	Partizan 1953
Scoring by quarter: 21:17, 19:9, 13:23, 12:24
Pts: Rajić 27; Rebs: Begenišić 11; Asts: Gligić 5		Pts: Inđić 24; Rebs: Inđić 13; Asts: Inđić 6

Obilićevo, Banja Luka
Attendance: 150
Referees: Holjevac, Hartman, Barišić

18 December 2019
17:00

Report

Trešnjevka 2009	47–77	Montana 2003
Scoring by quarter: 7:15, 15:15, 20:22, 5:25
Pts: Pavić 14; Rebs: Pavić 12; Asts: Mühl 4		Pts: Dimitrova 20; Rebs: Tavić 7 Asts: Stoycheva 6

Sutinska vrela, Zagreb
Attendance: 20
Referees: Bajgorić, Hasić, Jurić

18 December 2019
19:00

Report

Budućnost Bemax	85–76	Cinkarna Celje
Scoring by quarter: 16:19, 14:11, 27:17, 28:29
Pts: Babić, Mitrašinović 17; Rebs: Đorđević 7 Asts: Babić, Mitrašinović 6		Pts: Bogićević 18; Rebs: Bogićević 9 Asts: Deer 6

Bemax Arena, Podgorica
Attendance: 500
Referees: Bajramović, Mjeda, Pepur

=== Game 11 ===
26 December 2019
19:00

Report

Budućnost Bemax	20–0	Beroe

Bemax Arena, Podgorica
Attendance: 0
Referees: Bajgorić, Hasić, Bambur

23 December 2019
18:00

Report

Cinkarna Celje	106–56	Trešnjevka 2009
Scoring by quarter: 21:15, 30:12, 32:16, 23:13
Pts: Bogićević, Hersler 21; Rebs: Kostourkova 9 Asts: Deer 11		Pts: Pavić 16; Rebs: Majstorović 7 Asts: Pavić 5

Hall Gimnazija Center Celje, Celje
Attendance: 100
Referees: Adamović, Dojčinović, Rađević

24 December 2019
14:00

Report

Montana 2003	70–61	Orlovi
Scoring by quarter: 21:10, 14:18, 17:13, 18:20
Pts: Trebec 21; Rebs: Tavić 9 Asts: Tavić 5		Pts: Rajić 20; Rebs: Begenišić 11; Asts: Vasilić 6

Mladost Hall, Montana
Attendance: 300
Referees: Matić, Dašić, Živković

25 December 2019
20:30

Report

Partizan 1953	83–78	RMU Banovići
Scoring by quarter: 21:26, 24:20, 16:13, 22:19
Pts: Inđić 23; Rebs: Inđić 9 Asts: Inđić 6		Pts: Vrančić, Marković 18; Rebs: Marković 12; Asts: Delić 6

Vizura Sport, Belgrade
Attendance: 150
Referees: Krstevski, Petrovski, Tasevski

25 December 2019
18:30

Report

Crvena zvezda Kombank	69–84	Kraljevo
Scoring by quarter: 16:31, 20:16, 16:19, 17:18
Pts: I. Katanić 22; Rebs: I. Katanić 11; Asts: I. Katanić 6		Pts: Gobeljić 19; Rebs: Hill 11; Asts: Hill 11

Basket City, Belgrade
Attendance: 80
Referees: Strika, Sedlar, Jovičin

=== Game 12 ===
9 January 2020
18:30

Report

Beroe	93–46	Crvena zvezda Kombank
Scoring by quarter: 25:19, 23:9, 19:8, 26:10
Pts: Dineva 19; Rebs: Zlatanova 17; Asts: Ivanova 6		Pts: I. Katanić, Tešić 11; Rebs: Deurić 7 Asts: three players 2

Municipal Hall, Stara Zagora
Attendance: 200
Referees: Davidov, Petrović, Jakova

8 January 2020
17:30

Report

Kraljevo	96–62	Partizan 1953
Scoring by quarter: 26:12, 25:25, 29:13, 16:12
Pts: Pierre-Louis 21; Rebs: Hill 16; Asts: Hill, Bajić 6		Pts: Inđić 19; Rebs: Mitrović 6 Asts: Popović 3

Sports Hall, Kraljevo
Attendance: 1000
Referees: Lakićević, Đikanović, Ćetković

8 January 2020
18:30

Report

RMU Banovići	57–69	Montana 2003
Scoring by quarter: 16:19, 12:10, 17:23, 12:17
Pts: Marković 19; Rebs: Marković 9 Asts: Vrančić 4		Pts: Dimitrova 20; Rebs: Trebec 6 Asts: Tavić 4

SKC Banovići, Banovići
Attendance: 50
Referees: Pešić, Vlahović, Čalić

8 January 2020
17:00

Report

Orlovi	59–77	Cinkarna Celje
Scoring by quarter: 22:22, 14:20, 17:16, 6:19
Pts: Rajić 18; Rebs: Begenišić 11; Asts: Ristić 6		Pts: Hersler 23; Rebs: Hersler 16; Asts: Deer 6

Obilićevo, Banja Luka
Attendance: 100
Referees: Glavurdić, Juraga, Jež

12 February 2020
17:45

Report

Trešnjevka 2009	66–80	Budućnost Bemax
Scoring by quarter: 20:18, 16:22, 22:21, 8:19
Pts: three players 15; Rebs: Pavić 11; Asts: Mühl 7		Pts: Džebo 19; Rebs: Bura 11; Asts: Džebo 5

Dom sportova 2, Zagreb
Attendance: 50
Referees: Adamović, Skenderija, Dojčinović

=== Game 13 ===
15 January 2020
18:00

Report

Trešnjevka 2009	62–86	Beroe
Scoring by quarter: 19:20, 13:25, 16:25, 14:16
Pts: Majstorović 14; Rebs: Pavić 10; Asts: Mühl 8		Pts: Kocheva 26; Rebs: Zlatanova, Adams 7 Asts: three players 3

Dom sportova 2, Zagreb
Attendance: 50
Referees: Pelja, Bajgorić, Hasić

16 January 2020
19:00

Report

Budućnost Bemax	73–50	Orlovi
Scoring by quarter: 29:14, 15:9, 14:14, 15:13
Pts: Džebo 21; Rebs: Džebo, Bura 6 Asts: Džebo 8		Pts: Rajić 18; Rebs: Begenišić 7 Asts: Ristić, Rajić 2

Bemax Arena, Podgorica
Attendance: 100
Referees: Bajramović, Pepur, Strikić

15 January 2020
18:00

Report

Cinkarna Celje	105–88	RMU Banovići
Scoring by quarter: 23:28, 29:15, 23:19, 30:26
Pts: Deer 24; Rebs: Seničar 13; Asts: Deer 8		Pts: Zeljković 24; Rebs: three players 6 Asts: Vrančić 9

Hall Gimnazija Center Celje, Celje
Attendance: 150
Referees: Lenac, Žagar, Miletić

15 January 2020
18:30

Report

Montana 2003	95–62	Kraljevo
Scoring by quarter: 37:18, 16:15, 26:16, 16:13
Pts: Tavić 19; Rebs: Georgieva 8 Asts: Tavić 9		Pts: Hill 16; Rebs: Hill 13; Asts: Hill 7

Mladost Hall, Montana
Attendance: 500
Referees: Holjevac, Pencinger, Barišić

15 January 2020
17:45

Report

Partizan 1953	57–64	Crvena zvezda Kombank
Scoring by quarter: 20:20, 15:17, 15:18, 7:9
Pts: Inđić 23; Rebs: Inđić 8 Asts: Inđić 3		Pts: I. Katanić 18; Rebs: I. Katanić 9 Asts: I. Katanić 11

Vizura Sport, Belgrade
Attendance: 100
Referees: Miloradović, Pešić, Marković

=== Game 14 ===
31 January 2020
18:30

Report

Beroe	70–59	Partizan 1953
Scoring by quarter: 17:8, 24:14, 22:18, 7:19
Pts: Ivanova 17; Rebs: Aksentieva 7 Asts: Kocheva 6		Pts: Mitrović, Inđić 14; Rebs: Marjanović 16; Asts: Inđić 3

Municipal Hall, Stara Zagora
Attendance: 300
Referees: Bajgorić, Hasić, Bambur

22 January 2020
18:00

Report

Crvena zvezda Kombank	59–93	Montana 2003
Scoring by quarter: 18:17, 18:21, 17:23, 6:32
Pts: Tešić 13; Rebs: Čubra 7 Asts: Čubra 9		Pts: Trebec 21; Rebs: Trebec 9 Asts: Stoycheva 10

Basket City, Belgrade
Attendance: 50
Referees: N. Nikšić, T. Nikšić, Kadrić

22 January 2020
18:00

Report

Kraljevo	98–76	Cinkarna Celje
Scoring by quarter: 18:23, 25:20, 31:17, 24:16
Pts: Gobeljić 22; Rebs: Pierre-Louis 17; Asts: Hill 13		Pts: Krošelj 20; Rebs: Hersler 9 Asts: Deer 8

Sports Hall, Kraljevo
Attendance: 1000
Referees: Lakićević, Vuković, Kuburović

22 January 2020
18:30

Report

RMU Banovići	47–78	Budućnost Bemax
Scoring by quarter: 16:18, 16:17, 7:24, 8:19
Pts: Vrančić 13; Rebs: Marković 7 Asts: Vrančić 3		Pts: Bura 24; Rebs: Bura 9 Asts: Babić 7

SKC Banovići, Banovići
Attendance: 150
Referees: Miloradović, Vlahovic, Ćalić

22 January 2020
17:00

Report

Orlovi	76–55	Trešnjevka 2009
Scoring by quarter: 20:20, 11:9, 20:11, 25:15
Pts: three players 17; Rebs: Ristić 10; Asts: Ristić 13		Pts: Pavić 14; Rebs: Majstorović 13; Asts: Turkalj 4

Obilićevo, Banja Luka
Attendance: 100
Referees: Gajšek, Mohorič, Dovč

=== Game 15 ===
29 January 2020
17:00

Report

Orlovi	96–78	Beroe
Scoring by quarter: 26:32, 34:13, 17:17, 19:16
Pts: Rajić 28; Rebs: Rajić 8 Asts: Ristić 10		Pts: Adams, Konstantinova 14; Rebs: Zlatanova 10; Asts: Zlatanova 5

Obilićevo, Banja Luka
Attendance: 100
Referees: Holjevac, Lipovac, Lombar

5 February 2020
17:45

Report

Trešnjevka 2009	97–74	RMU Banovići
Scoring by quarter: 25:21, 20:14, 23:20, 29:19
Pts: Pavić 22; Rebs: Pavić 15; Asts: Mühl 7		Pts: Delić 27; Rebs: Zeljković, Ibrić 6 Asts: Ikanović 9

Dom sportova 2, Zagreb
Attendance: 25
Referees: Gajšek, Mauer, Oprčkal

29 January 2020
19:00

Report

Budućnost Bemax	70–66	Kraljevo
Scoring by quarter: 27:12, 15:18, 14:26, 14:10
Pts: Babić 20; Rebs: A. Katanić, Bura 7 Asts: Babić 6		Pts: Hill 21; Rebs: Gobeljić 9 Asts: Hill 7

Bemax Arena, Podgorica
Attendance: 500
Referees: Porobić, Radanović, Komar

29 January 2020
18:00

Report

Cinkarna Celje	20–0	Crvena zvezda Kombank

Hall Gimnazija Center Celje, Celje
Attendance: 0
Referees: Galiot, Čačić, Šonjić

30 January 2020
17:30

Report

Montana 2003	90–67	Partizan 1953
Scoring by quarter: 29:16, 23:16, 25:16, 13:19
Pts: Georgieva, Trebec 16; Rebs: Georgieva, Trebec 8 Asts: Tavić 10		Pts: Marjanović 16; Rebs: Marjanović 8 Asts: Mitrović 6

Mladost Hall, Montana
Attendance: 400
Referees: Bajgoric, Hašić, Bambur

=== Game 16 ===
19 February 2020
18:30

Report

Beroe	79–72	Montana 2003
Scoring by quarter: 21:26, 20:18, 24:12, 14:16
Pts: Adams 17; Rebs: Adams 9 Asts: Zlatanova 4		Pts: Trebec 26; Rebs: Tavić 9 Asts: Georgieva, Tavić 5

Municipal Hall, Stara Zagora
Attendance: 400
Referees: Vesković, Miloradović, Milojević

19 February 2020
18:00

Report

Partizan 1953	68–94	Cinkarna Celje
Scoring by quarter: 22:32, 19:24, 10:18, 17:20
Pts: Inđić 11; Rebs: Inđić, Repac 5 Asts: Popović, Inđić 5		Pts: Deer 18; Rebs: Bogićević 9 Asts: Deer 7

Vizura Sport, Belgrade
Attendance: 100
Referees: Bajgorić, Hasić, Bambur

19 February 2020
18:30

Report

Crvena zvezda Kombank	75–70	Budućnost Bemax
Scoring by quarter: 19:15, 18:18, 18:19, 20:18
Pts: I. Katanć 22; Rebs: I. Katanć 12; Asts: I. Katanć 8		Pts: Babić 19; Rebs: Jakšić, Džebo 8 Asts: Živković 6

Basket City, Belgrade
Attendance: 100
Referees: N. Nikšić, Lasetovic, T. Nikšić

20 February 2020
17:30

Report

Kraljevo	92–75	Trešnjevka 2009
Scoring by quarter: 23:20, 26:20, 27:12, 16:23
Pts: three players 17; Rebs: Hill, Gobeljić 5 Asts: Hill 9		Pts: Pavić 20; Rebs: Mühl 11; Asts: Mühl 6

Sports Hall, Kraljevo
Attendance: 500
Referees: Lakićević, Gušmirović, Ćetković

19 February 2020
18:30

Report

RMU Banovići	66–51	Orlovi
Scoring by quarter: 15:17, 20:13, 14:10, 17:11
Pts: Delić 19; Rebs: Vrančić, Marković 11; Asts: Vrančić 5		Pts: Rajić 20; Rebs: Ristić 10; Asts: three players 2

SKC Banovići, Banovići
Attendance: 150
Referees: Pešić, Strika, Vlahović

=== Game 17 ===
26 February 2020
18:30

Report

RMU Banovići	69–93	Beroe
Scoring by quarter: 14:31, 22:27, 10:19, 23:16
Pts: Marković 16; Rebs: Delić 6 Asts: Vrančić 4		Pts: Dineva 23; Rebs: Ivanova 8 Asts: Kocheva 5

SKC Banovići, Banovići
Attendance: 50
Referees: Veskovič, Marković, Čalić

26 February 2020
17:00

Report

Orlovi	71–70	Kraljevo
Scoring by quarter: 14:25, 13:24, 25:11, 19:10
Pts: Ristić 21; Rebs: Begenišić 9 Asts: Svitlica 6		Pts: Pierre-Louis 30; Rebs: Pierre-Louis 17; Asts: Bajić 6

Obilićevo, Banja Luka
Attendance: 100
Referees: Holjevac, Hartman, Barišić

26 February 2020
17:00

Report

Trešnjevka 2009	81–62	Crvena zvezda Kombank
Scoring by quarter: 19:11, 16:19, 26:20, 20:12
Pts: Katavić 16; Rebs: Pavić 14; Asts: Katavić 8		Pts: Bojović 17; Rebs: three players 5 Asts: I. Katanić 10

Sutinska vrela, Zagreb
Attendance: 30
Referees: Adamović, Skenderija, Rađević

27 February 2020
19:00

Report

Budućnost Bemax	85–45	Partizan 1953
Scoring by quarter: 28:13, 17:9, 22:13, 18:10
Pts: A. Katanić 18; Rebs: Džebo 7 Asts: Babić 7		Pts: Samardžić 13; Rebs: Inđić 4 Asts: Popović, Stojanović 5

Bemax Arena, Podgorica
Attendance: 500
Referees: Vlaho, Šutalo, Brekalo

26 February 2020
18:00

Report

Cinkarna Celje	69–47	Montana 2003
Scoring by quarter: 23:8, 20:9, 15:18, 11:12
Pts: Hersler 14; Rebs: Seničar 12; Asts: Deer 8		Pts: Tavić 17; Rebs: Tavić 7 Asts: Tavić 6

Hall Gimnazija Center Celje, Celje
Attendance: 150
Referees: Pavičić, Galiot, Ekart

=== Game 18 ===
4 March 2020
18:30

Report

Beroe	94–87 (OT)	Cinkarna Celje
Scoring by quarter: 18:20, 24:18, 20:22, 19:21, Overtime: 13:6
Pts: Adams 19; Rebs: Zlatanova 12; Asts: Zlatanova, Bachvarova 5		Pts: Deer 17; Rebs: Hersler 12; Asts: Deer 5

Municipal Hall, Stara Zagora
Attendance: 200
Referees: Miloradović, Strika, Matić

3 March 2020
18:30

Report

Montana 2003	55–63	Budućnost Bemax
Scoring by quarter: 15:17, 17:13, 11:18, 12:15
Pts: Trebec 10; Rebs: Dimitrova 7 Asts: Tavić 8		Pts: Babić 17; Rebs: Đorđevic 8 Asts: Babić 10

Mladost, Montana
Attendance: 400
Referees: Pešić, Marković, Vlahović

4 March 2020
20:30

Report

Partizan 1953	69–65	Trešnjevka 2009
Scoring by quarter: 13:21, 24:19, 12:12, 20:13
Pts: Marjanović 18; Rebs: Marjanović 9 Asts: Inđić 13		Pts: Pavić 25; Rebs: Pavić 15; Asts: Mühl 10

Vizira Sport, Belgrade
Attendance: 50
Referees: Nožinović, Ališehovćc, Kasumović

5 March 2020
18:30

Report

Crvena zvezda Kombank	84–74	Orlovi
Scoring by quarter: 31:12, 16:22, 17:21, 20:19
Pts: I. Katanić 21; Rebs: Janković 11; Asts: I. Katanić 13		Pts: Svitlica 21; Rebs: Begenišić 11; Asts: Ristić, Rajić 9

Basket City, Belgrade
Attendance: 50
Referees: Holjevac, Matej Grubišić, Lombar

4 March 2020
17:30

Report

Kraljevo	95–58	RMU Banovići
Scoring by quarter: 21:15, 23:20, 38:7, 13:16
Pts: Gobeljić 19; Rebs: Račić 10; Asts: Račić 6		Pts: Zeljković 23; Rebs: Zeljković 9 Asts: Zeljković, Karić 4

Sports Hall, Kraljevo
Attendance: 1000
Referees: Kuburović, Ćetković, Bajrović
