= 2019–20 WABA League =

WABA League
- Season: 2019–20
- Duration: October 2, 2019 – March 5, 2020 (Regular season); 21–22 March 2020 (Final Four)
- Games played: 90
- Teams: 10

Finals
- Champions: (Montenegro) Budućnost Bemax (3rd title)
- All statistics correct as of August 3, 2020.

The 2019–20 BTravel WABA League was the 19th season of the Adriatic League. Competition included eight teams from six countries. In this season, participating clubs from Serbia, Croatia, Montenegro, Bosnia and Herzegovina, Bulgaria and Slovenia.

== Teams ==
=== Team allocation ===
Regular season
| (Bulgaria) Montana 2003 | (Bosnia and Herzegovina) RMU Banovići | (Slovenia) Cinkarna Celje | (Serbia) Crvena zvezda Kombank | (Croatia) Trešnjevka 2009 |
| (Bulgaria) Beroe | (Bosnia and Herzegovina) Orlovi | (Serbia) Kraljevo | (Serbia) Partizan 1953 | (Montenegro) Budućnost Bemax |

=== Venues and locations ===
Location of teams in the 2019–20 WABA League
Location of teams in the 2019–20 WABA League

| Team | Home city | Arena | Capacity |
|---|---|---|---|
| Beroe | Stara Zagora | Municipal Hall | 1,000 |
| Budućnost Bemax | Podgorica | University Sports&Culture Hall | 770 |
| Cinkarna Celje | Celje | Hall Gimnazija Center Celje | 1,500 |
| Crvena zvezda Kombank | Belgrade | Železnik Hall | 3,000 |
| Montana 2003 | Montana | Sports Hall Mladost | |
| Trešnjevka 2009 | Zagreb | Dom Sportova | 3,100 |
| Partizan 1953 | Beograd | Ranko Žeravica Sports Hall | 5,000 |
| Kraljevo | Kraljevo | Sports Hall Kraljevo | |
| Orlovi | Banja Luka | | |
| RMU Banovići | Banovići | SKC Banovici | |

== Regular season ==
In the Regular season was played with 10 teams and play a dual circuit system, each with each one game at home and away. The four best teams at the end of the regular season were placed in the Final Four. The regular season began on 2 October 2019 and it will end on 4 March 2020.

=== Standings ===
| Pos | Team | Pld | W | L | PF | PA | PD | Pts | Qualification or relegation |
|---|---|---|---|---|---|---|---|---|---|
| 1 | (Montenegro) Budućnost Bemax | 18 | 15 | 3 | 1340 | 1021 | +319 | 33 | Advance to the Final Four |
| 2 | (Slovenia) Cinkarna Celje | 18 | 14 | 4 | 1471 | 1171 | +300 | 32 | Advance to the Final Four |
| 3 | (Bulgaria) Montana 2003 | 18 | 13 | 5 | 1354 | 1203 | +151 | 31 | Advance to the Final Four |
| 4 | (Bulgaria) Beroe (-1) | 18 | 14 | 4 | 1444 | 1193 | +251 | 32 | Advance to the Final Four |
| 5 | (Serbia) Kraljevo | 18 | 11 | 7 | 1413 | 1305 | +108 | 29 | |
| 6 | (Bosnia and Herzegovina) RMU Banovići | 18 | 5 | 13 | 1288 | 1479 | −191 | 23 | |
| 7 | (Serbia) Partizan 1953 | 18 | 5 | 13 | 1173 | 1434 | −261 | 23 | |
| 8 | (Serbia) Crvena zvezda Kombank (-1) | 18 | 5 | 13 | 1151 | 1313 | −162 | 23 | |
| 9 | (Bosnia and Herzegovina) Orlovi | 18 | 4 | 14 | 1192 | 1429 | −237 | 22 | |
| 10 | (Croatia) Trešnjevka 2009 | 18 | 4 | 14 | 1204 | 1482 | −278 | 22 | |

Updated to match(es) played on March 5, 2020. Source: WABA League

== Final Four ==
Final Four which was to be played from 21 to 22 March 2020 in the Stara Zagora, Bulgaria, but it was canceled due to the spread of COVID-19. The final standings were announced on the basis of the Regular season.

Semi-finals; 21 March
(Montenegro) Budućnost Bemax | .
(Bulgaria) Beroe | .
(Slovenia) Cinkarna Celje | .
(Bulgaria) Montana 2003 | .

Final; 22 March
. | .
. | .
Third place
. | .
. | .

2019–20 Adriatic League champion

Budućnost Bemax
3rd title

== Awards ==
- Player of the Year: Andreona Keys (178-G-95) of (Slovenia) Cinkarna Celje
- Guard of the Year: Nikolina Babić (177-G-95) of (Montenegro) Budućnost Bemax
- Forward of Year: Andreona Keys (178-G-95) of (Slovenia) Cinkarna Celje
- Center of the Year: Dimana Georgieva (188-F/C-88) of (Bulgaria) Montana 2003
- Newcomer of the Year: Maša Janković (187-C-00) of (Serbia) Crvena zvezda
- Most Improved Player of Year: Josipa Pavić (189-C-99) of (Croatia) Trešnjevka 2009
- Defensive Player of Year: Shakyla Hill (170-G-96) of (Serbia) Kraljevo
- Coach of the Year: Vladan Radović of (Montenegro) Budućnost Bemax

1st Team

- G: Shakyla Hill (170-G-96) of (Serbia) Kraljevo
- G: Nikolina Babić (177-G-95) of (Montenegro) Budućnost Bemax
- G: Andreona Keys (178-G-95) of (Slovenia) Cinkarna Celje
- F/C: Dimana Georgieva (188-F/C-88) of (Bulgaria) Montana 2003
- C: Adijat Adams (188-C-92) of (Bulgaria) Beroe

2nd Team

- PG: Ivana Katanić (180-PG-99) of (Serbia) Crvena zvezda
- SG: Snežana Bogićević (177-SG-97) of (Slovenia) Cinkarna Celje
- G/F: Teodora Dineva (178-G/F-96) of (Bulgaria) Beroe
- C: Tina Trebec (190-C-90) of (Bulgaria) Montana 2003
- F/C: Nikolina Džebo (186-F/C-95) of (Montenegro) Budućnost Bemax

Honorable Mention

- Taeler Deer (165-G-96) of (Slovenia) Cinkarna Celje
- Matea Tavić (178-G-92) of (Bulgaria) Montana 2003
- Jaklin Zlatanova (190-PF-88) of (Bulgaria) Beroe
- Chelsey Lee (193-C-89) of (Bulgaria) Beroe
- Aleksandra Račić (181-G-90) of (Serbia) Kraljevo
- Dragana Gobeljic (181-F-88) of (Serbia) Kraljevo
- Jovana Marković (186-PF-97) of (Bosnia and Herzegovina) RMU Banovići
- Tamara Rajić (182-G/F-93) of (Bosnia and Herzegovina) Orlovi
- Josipa Pavić (189-C-99) of (Croatia) Trešnjevka 2009

All-Defensive Team

- G: Shakyla Hill (170-G-96) of (Serbia) Kraljevo
- PG: Ivana Katanić (180-PG-99) of (Serbia) Crvena zvezda
- G/F: Teodora Dineva (178-G/F-96) of (Bulgaria) Beroe
- F/C: Dimana Georgieva (188-F/C-88) of (Bulgaria) Montana 2003
- C: Adijat Adams (188-C-92) of (Bulgaria) Beroe

All-Newcomers Team

- PG: Anđela Gligić (157-PG-00) of (Bosnia and Herzegovina) Orlovi
- G: Milica Zeljković (176-G-98) of (Bosnia and Herzegovina) RMU Banovići
- C: Maša Janković (187-C-00) of (Serbia) Crvena zvezda
- F: Gorana Marjanović (188-F-00) of (Serbia) Partizan 1953
- C: Josipa Jurić (196-C-01) of (Croatia) Trešnjevka 2009

== See also ==
- 2019–20 ABA League First Division
- 2019–20 First Women's Basketball League of Serbia
