= Double-double =

Statistic in basketball

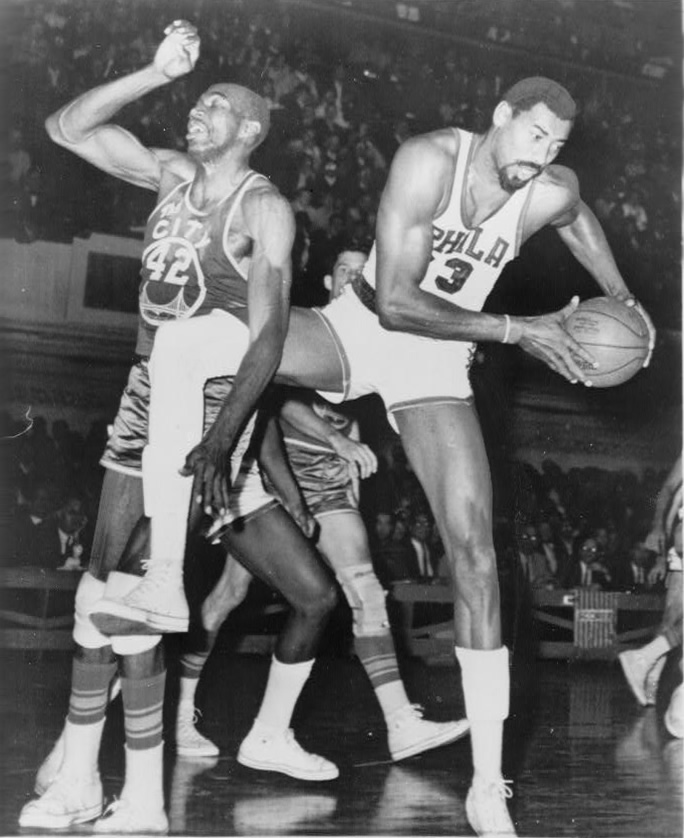
Wilt Chamberlain (#13) holds the record for most career double-doubles in the NBA with 968, while Nate Thurmond (#42) was the first to record a quadruple-double.

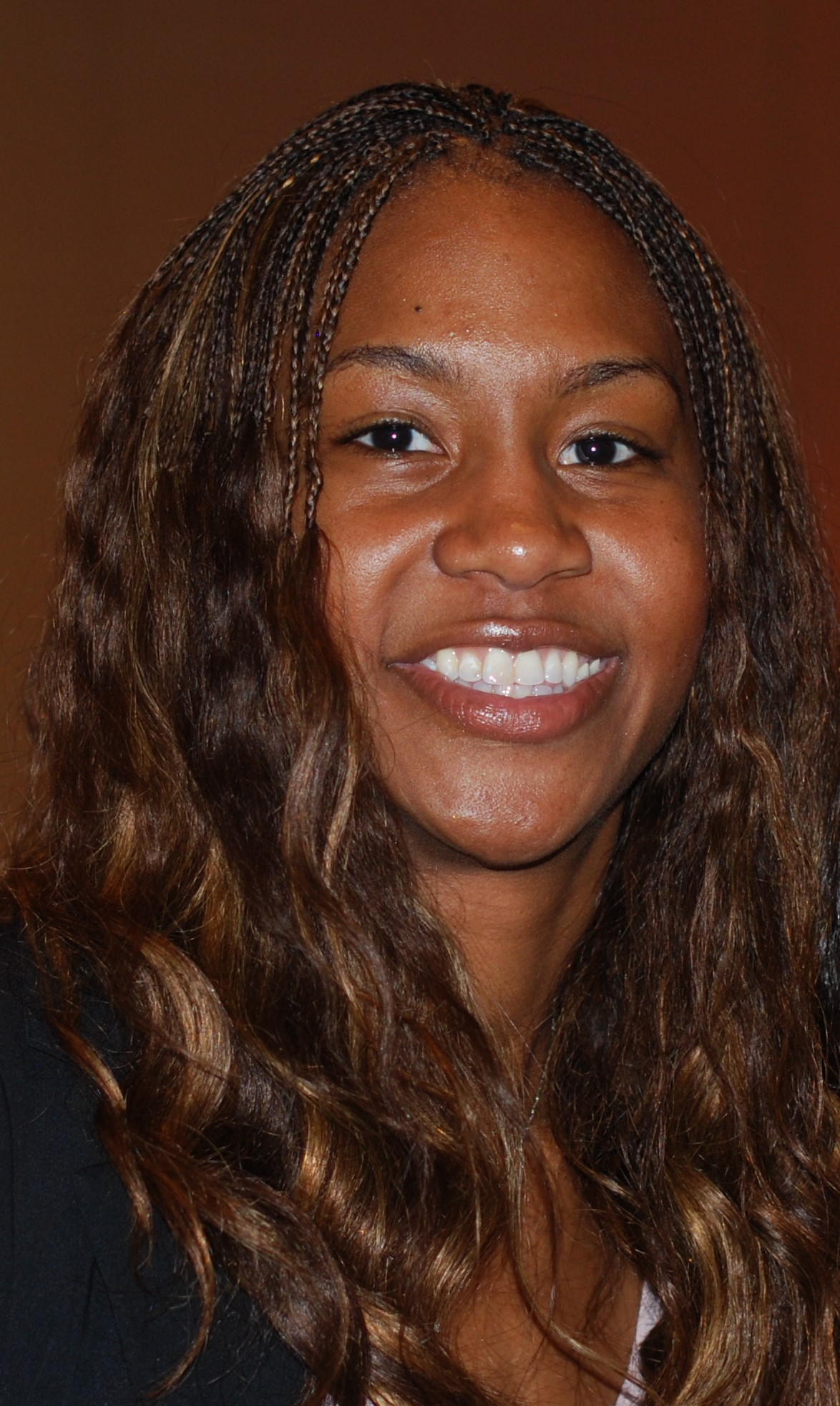
Duncanville High School forward Tamika Catchings was the first woman player to record a quintuple-double after Wilt Chamberlain.

In basketball, a double-double is a single-game performance in which a player accumulates ten or more in two of the following five statistical categories: points, rebounds, assists, steals, and blocked shots. The first "double" in the term refers to the two (double) categories and the second "double" refers to accumulating ten or more (typically double digits) in that category. Similarly, a player records a triple-double, quadruple-double, and quintuple-double when accumulating ten or more in three, four, or all five of the statistical categories, respectively. While double-doubles and triple-doubles occur regularly each NBA season, only four quadruple-doubles have ever been officially recorded in the league. Those performances were recorded by Nate Thurmond (1974), Alvin Robertson (1986), Hakeem Olajuwon (1990), and David Robinson (1994). It is sometimes claimed that Wilt Chamberlain recorded an unofficial quintuple-double on March 18, 1968, in a 158–128 Philadelphia 76ers win over the Los Angeles Lakers with the official box score showing 53 points, 32 rebounds, and 14 assists, and later reconstructions attributing additional blocks and steals. Because the NBA did not begin officially recording steals and blocks until the 1973–74 season, such claims are not recognized as official league records. A related achievement, the five-by-five, is recorded when a player totals at least five each in points, rebounds, assists, steals, and blocks in a single game; it is also rare.

== Double-double ==
A double-double is a performance in which a player accumulates a double-digit total in two of five statistical categories—points, rebounds, assists, steals, and blocked shots—in a game. The most common double-double combination is points and rebounds, followed by points and assists. During the 2008–09 NBA season, 69 players who were eligible for leadership in the main statistical categories recorded at least ten double-doubles during the season.

Since the 1983–84 season, Tim Duncan leads the National Basketball Association (NBA) in the points–rebounds combination with 841 double-doubles, John Stockton leads the points–assists combination with 714, and Russell Westbrook leads the rebounds–assists combinations with 142. Since the 1983–84 season, Tim Duncan also holds the record for most total career double-doubles in the NBA, having recorded 841. In league history, the record for most career double-doubles is 968, held by Wilt Chamberlain.

Special double-doubles are rare. One such achievement is sometimes called a 20–20, double double-double, or double-20, when a player accumulates 20 or more in two statistics in a game. Another similar feat is a 30–30. The only player in NBA history to record a 40–40 is Wilt Chamberlain, who achieved the feat eight times in his career, four of which were in his rookie season.

- Longest continuous streak of double-doubles: According to the Elias Sports Bureau, Wilt Chamberlain holds the record with 227 consecutive double-doubles from 1964 to 1967. Chamberlain also holds the second- and third-longest continuous streaks of double-doubles with 220 and 133. This record is before the ABA–NBA merger in 1976. The longest streak of double-doubles since the merger is actively 61 games, achieved by Domantas Sabonis of the Sacramento Kings.
- Youngest player: Tracy McGrady (Toronto Raptors), aged 18 years and 175 days, logged a double-double on November 15, 1997, versus the Indiana Pacers. He had 10 points and 11 rebounds.
- Oldest player: Dikembe Mutombo (Houston Rockets), aged 42 years and 289 days, logged a double-double on April 10, 2009, versus the Golden State Warriors. He had 10 points and 15 rebounds.

== Triple-double ==
A triple-double is a single-game performance by a player who accumulates a double-digit number total in three of five statistical categories—points, rebounds, assists, steals, and blocked shots—in a game. The most common way for a player to achieve a triple-double is with points, rebounds, and assists, though on occasion players may record 10 or more steals or blocked shots in a game. The origin of the term "triple-double" is unclear. Some sources claim that it was coined in the NBA by former Los Angeles Lakers public relations director Bruce Jolesch in the 1980s in order to showcase Magic Johnson's versatility, while others claim that it was coined by then Philadelphia 76ers media relations director Harvey Pollack in 1980. The earliest known appearances of the phrase in print come from October 1980 issues of the Los Angeles Times, although, as early as 1974, Bob Ryan wrote in The Boston Globe that "John Havlicek just missed a triple double-figure night."

=== Triple-doubles in the NBA ===
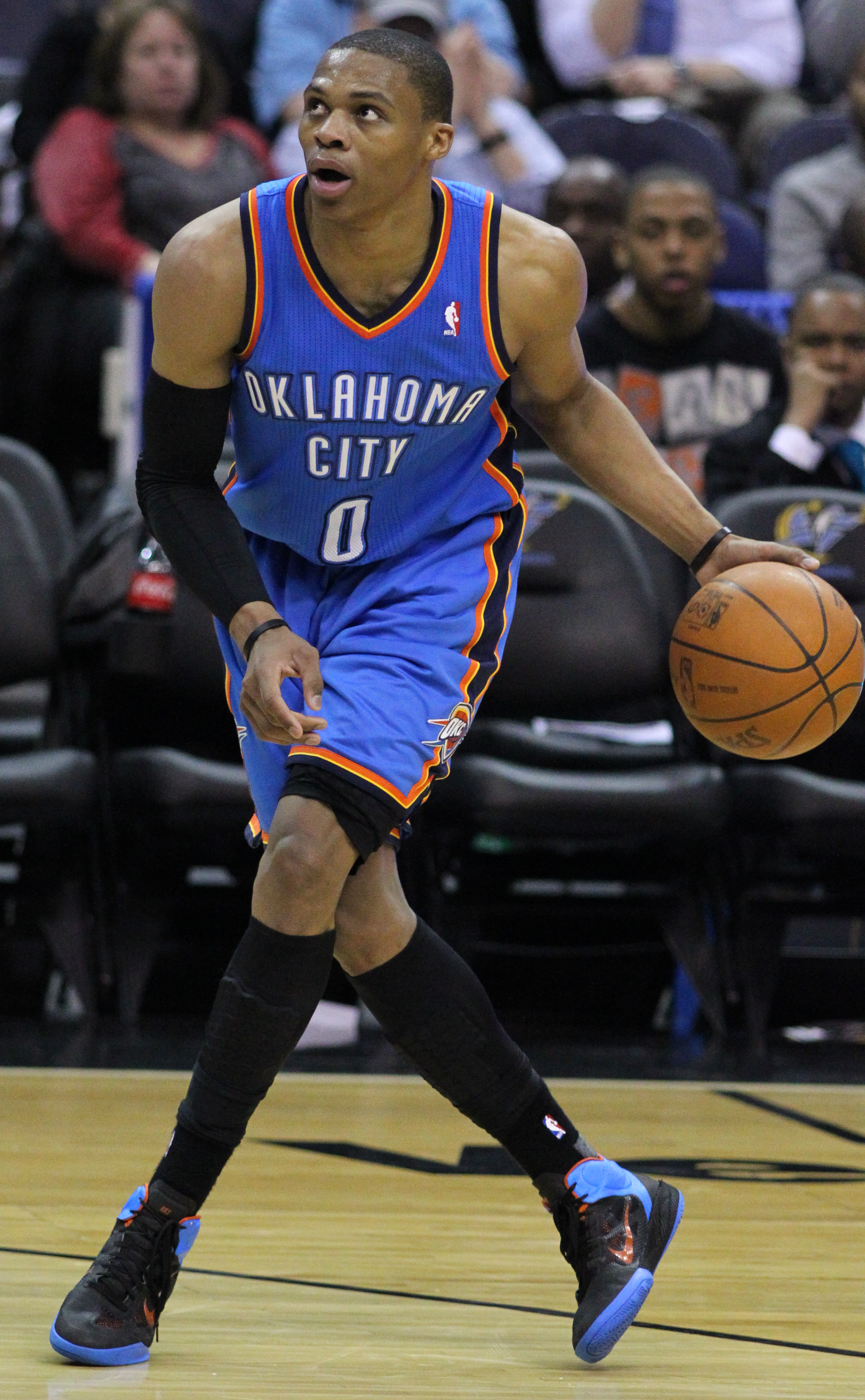
Russell Westbrook holds the record for the most NBA career regular season triple-doubles with 209, and has averaged a triple-double in four different seasons.

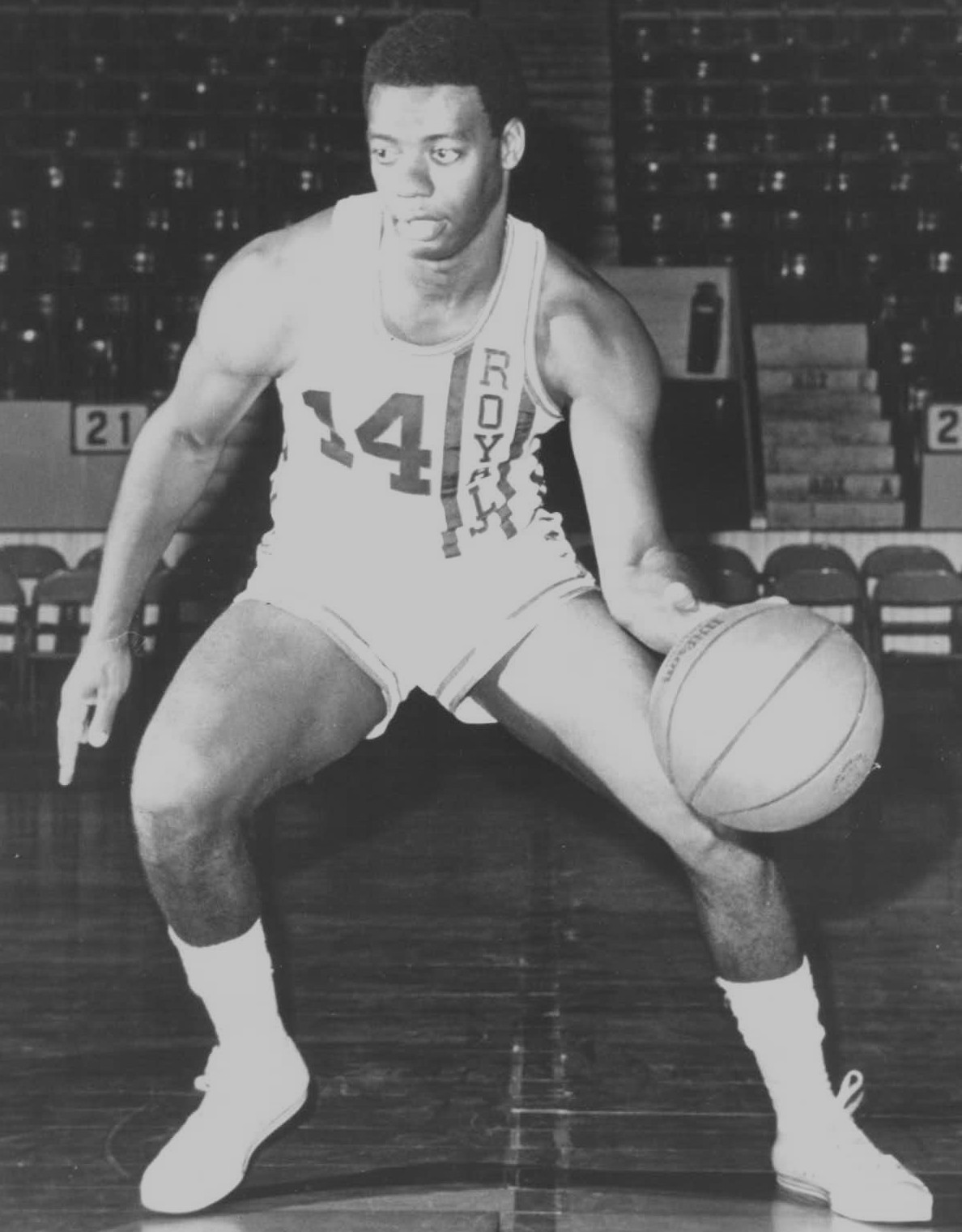
Oscar Robertson is third in NBA career regular season triple-doubles with 181, and was the first player to average a triple-double, achieving the feat in the 1961–1962 season.

The triple-double became an officially recorded statistic in the NBA during the 1979–80 season. That season, there were 32 triple-doubles, 12 more than the previous season. From the 1979–80 to the 1990–91 seasons, the NBA recorded a total of 543 triple-doubles, or 45.25 triple-doubles per season. This can be largely attributed to Magic Johnson, who was responsible for 137 of this timespan's triple-doubles, or about 25.23% of them. After Johnson retired in 1991, the number of triple-doubles in the league declined. From the 1991–92 to the 2014–15 seasons, there were only 841 triple-doubles, or about 35.04 triple-doubles per season. Jason Kidd recorded the most triple-doubles in this timespan with 107, which was 68 more than second placed LeBron James. However, in the 2015–16 season, the number of triple-doubles recorded in the NBA grew from 46 to 75. From the 2016–17 to the 2018–19 season, the NBA recorded 352 triple doubles, which was approximately 117.33 triple-doubles per season. Over those three years, Russell Westbrook recorded 101 triple-doubles—28.69% of all triple-doubles in that timespan.

During the 2017 NBA season on February 10, 2017, Warriors forward Draymond Green became the first player in NBA history to achieve a triple double without scoring 10 points. Green had 11 rebounds, 10 assists, 10 steals and 4 points while contributing to his team's victory over the Memphis Grizzlies 122–107.

There has been occasional controversy surrounding triple-doubles made when a player achieves the feat with a late rebound. Players with nine rebounds in a game have sometimes been accused of deliberately missing a shot late in the game in order to recover the rebound. One such case involved a player shooting at his own team's basket. On March 16, 2003, the Cleveland Cavaliers were up 120–95 against the Utah Jazz with four seconds left in the fourth quarter. Following an inbounded ball, Cavaliers guard Ricky Davis shot the ball off his own team's basket to secure the final rebound for a triple-double. The move was criticized by players, coaches, and the media. To deter this, NBA rules allow rebounds to be nullified if the shot is determined not to be a legitimate scoring attempt.

Russell Westbrook holds the NBA record for career triple-doubles with 209. He, Oscar Robertson and Nikola Jokić are the only three players to average a triple-double over a season, with Robertson achieving the feat once, Jokić twice, and Westbrook achieving the feat four times. Magic Johnson holds the playoff record for career triple-doubles with 30.

=== WNBA ===
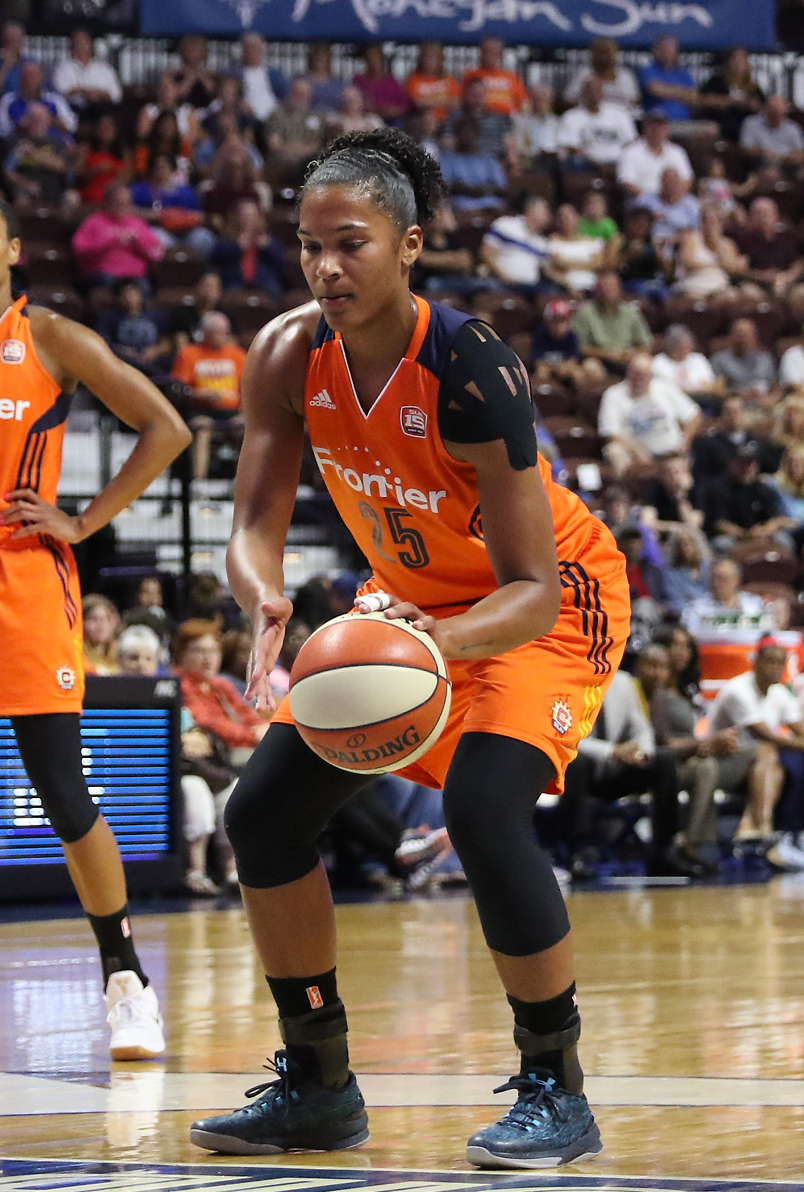
Alyssa Thomas of the Phoenix Mercury holds the WNBA record for career triple-doubles with twenty seven.

Triple-doubles have been rarer in the WNBA than in the NBA. Games are shorter (40 minutes vs 48), there are fewer games (fewer teams) in a season (44 vs 82), and the playing style in the WNBA is more of a team game than relying on star players. As of the mid-2026 season, 67 triple-doubles have been recorded in the WNBA. Alyssa Thomas has the all-time record with twenty seven, and no other player has more than five.

=== NCAA Division I ===
- Most triple-doubles in a career:
  - Men's: Kyle Collinsworth (BYU, 2010–11, 2013–16) with 12 — six in 2014–15 and six again as a senior in 2015–16. Before the triple-double being tracked as an NCAA statistic, Oscar Robertson (Cincinnati) had 10—five in 1958–59 and five in 1959–60.
    - Although BYU was forced to vacate all but one of its wins in the 2015–16 season due to improper benefits provided by boosters to another BYU player, Collinsworth's triple-double record was not affected.
  - Women's: Sabrina Ionescu (Oregon, 2016–2020) with 26 – four in 2016–17, six in 2017–18, eight in 2018–19, and eight in 2019–20.
- Consecutive triple-doubles: In Division I men's play, David Edwards (Texas A&M), Penny Hardaway (Memphis State), Tony Lee (Robert Morris), Gerald Lewis (SMU), Shaquille O'Neal (LSU), and Kevin Roberson (Vermont) each recorded two consecutive games with a triple-double.

In women's play, Danielle Carson (Youngstown State), Kim Rhock (Mount St. Mary's), Nicole Powell (Stanford), Ashley Schrock (Cleveland State), Claire Faucher (Portland State), Brittney Griner (Baylor), and Ny Hammonds (Charlotte) have accomplished this feat once. Powell did so in successive rounds of the NCAA tournament. Sabrina Ionescu has done so twice, and Chastadie Barrs of Lamar has done so three times, making them the only D-I players of either sex to do so more than once. Barrs is the only player to have recorded consecutive triple-doubles twice in a single season, doing so in 2018–19.
- Two women are the only NCAA players of either sex in any division to have recorded three consecutive triple-doubles. The first was Carson in the 1985–86 season. She began by recording 12 points, ten rebounds, and 12 assists against Akron on November 29, 1985. The following day, she recorded 20 points, 12 rebounds, and at least 20 assists against Kent State (her exact assists total in that game is unknown). Finally, on December 2 against Cleveland State, Carson recorded 26 points, 15 rebounds, and 14 assists. Barrs matched the feat in the 2018–19 season. She began with 17 points, ten rebounds, and 12 steals on January 9, 2019 against New Orleans. Next, on January 12, Barrs had ten points, 11 rebounds, and ten assists against Central Arkansas. Finally, on January 16, Barrs recorded 15 points, ten rebounds, and 11 assists against Southeastern Louisiana.

- Most triple-doubles in a single season:
  - Men's: Kyle Collinsworth (BYU), with six – performed twice: in the 2014–15 season, and again in 2015–16.
  - Women's: Sabrina Ionescu (Oregon), with eight in the 2018–19 season.
- Triple-doubles in NCAA tournament history:

Men's

The NCAA first recorded individual assists in men's basketball in 1950–51, but stopped doing so after the 1951–52 season, and did not resume keeping track of assists until 1983–84. Blocks and steals were first recorded in 1985–86. Thus, the NCAA officially records ten tournament triple-doubles. However, many tournaments had included assists, steals and blocks in their official boxscores prior to that time, so unofficially this has occurred 18 times. Only three pre-1986 triple-doubles are included below.

Name	Team	Score	Opponent	Round	Date	Minutes played	Points	Rebounds	Assists	Steals	Blocks	Reference
Oscar Robertson	Cincinnati	98–85	Louisville	Third place	March 21, 1959	39	39	17	10	—	—	
Magic Johnson	Michigan State	95–64	Lamar	Second round	March 10, 1979	35	13	17	10			
Magic Johnson	Michigan State	101–67	Penn	Final Four	March 24, 1979	35	29	10	10	3	0	
Gary Grant	Michigan	97–109	North Carolina	Second round	March 14, 1987	39	24	10	10	1	0	
Shaquille O'Neal	LSU	94–83	BYU	First round	March 19, 1992	31	26	13	4	1	11	
David Cain	St. John's	85–67	Texas Tech	First round	March 18, 1993	37	12	11	11	1	0	
Andre Miller	Utah	76–51	Arizona	Elite Eight	March 21, 1998	36	18	14	13	2	1	
Dwyane Wade	Marquette	83–69	Kentucky	Elite Eight	March 29, 2003	35	29	11	11	1	4	
Cole Aldrich	Kansas	60–43	Dayton	Second round	March 22, 2009	31	13	20	1	0	10	
Draymond Green	Michigan State	76–78	UCLA	First round	March 17, 2011	37	23	11	10	4	0	
Draymond Green	Michigan State	89–67	Long Island	Second round	March 16, 2012	35	24	12	10	1	0	
Ja Morant	Murray State	83–64	Marquette	First round	March 21, 2019	39	17	11	16	0	0	
Marcus Domask	Illinois	85–69	Morehead State	First round	March 21, 2024	36	12	11	10	0	0	

Women's

In women's basketball, the NCAA began keeping track of assists in 1985–86, then blocks and steals in 1987–88, so officially this has occurred 14 times. However, many tournaments had included assists, steals and blocks in their official boxscores prior to that time, so unofficially this has occurred 17 times. All three triple-doubles that preceded the NCAA's official inclusion of the relevant statistics are included below.

Name	Team	Score	Opponent	Round	Date	Points	Rebounds	Assists	Steals	Blocks	Reference
Cassandra Lander	Arizona State	97–77	Georgia	First round	March 12, 1982	17	11	10	—	—	
Anne Donovan	Old Dominion	74–60	Penn State	Elite Eight	March 26, 1983	20	13	—	—	12	
Joni Davis	Missouri	82–92	LSU	First round	March 18, 1984	14	11	10	—	—	
Katie Meier	Duke	70–55	Manhattan	First round	March 11, 1987	16	11	10	—	—	
Pauline Jordan	UNLV	84–74	Colorado	Second round	March 18, 1989	22	17	—	—	11	
Sonja Henning	Stanford	91–67	Cal State Fullerton	Second round	March 16, 1991	19	10	10	—	—	
Niesa Johnson	Alabama	121–120 (4OT)	Duke	Second round	March 18, 1995	28	12	14	—	—	
Tracy Henderson	Georgia	81–68	Louisville	Second round	March 19, 1995	14	13	—	—	10	
Ticha Penicheiro	Old Dominion	92–39	Saint Francis (PA)	First round	March 13, 1998	22	—	15	14	—	
Nicole Powell	Stanford	76–51	Weber State	First round	March 16, 2002	20	11	10	—	—	
Nicole Powell	Stanford	77–55	Tulane	Second round	March 18, 2002	16	10	10	—	—	
Kristin Haynie	Michigan State	76–64	Vanderbilt	Sweet Sixteen	March 27, 2005	16	10	10	—	—	
Skylar Diggins	Notre Dame	80–49	Maryland	Elite Eight	March 27, 2012	13	10	10	—	—	
Kaleena Mosqueda-Lewis	Connecticut	91–52	Saint Joseph's	Second round	March 25, 2014	20	10	10	—	—	
Samantha Logic	Iowa	66–81	Baylor	Sweet Sixteen	March 27, 2015	13	10	14	—	—	
Sabrina Ionescu	Oregon	88–45	Seattle	First round	March 16, 2018	19	10	11	—	—	
Sabrina Ionescu	Oregon	91–68	Indiana	Second round	March 24, 2019	29	10	12	3	0	
Caitlin Clark	Iowa	97–83	Louisville	Elite Eight	March 26, 2023	41	10	12	3	0	

- Others
  - Kalara McFadyen of Memphis achieved perhaps the most unusual triple-double in history, and she did it without scoring a point or even attempting a shot from either the field or the free-throw line. On February 3, 2002, in a women's Division I game against Charlotte, she had 12 assists, 10 steals, and 10 rebounds.

=== FIBA European Champions Cup and EuroLeague ===
Codi Miller-McIntyre is the most recent EuroLeague player to record a triple-double, doing so in 2024, and the first to record one since 2019.

Much like the WNBA, there are a few reasons why triple-doubles are far more rare in the EuroLeague than in the NBA. The games are 40 minutes long — 8 minutes shorter than in the NBA — there are 34 games in a season compared to the NBA's 82, and various rules — such as those on assists — are stricter than that of the NBA. As of 2024, only eight triple-doubles have been recorded in EuroLeague history, and only four in the modern era of Euroleague basketball (since 2000). The following is a list of all eight of these triple-doubles:

Name	Team	Opponent	Season	Points	Rebounds	Assists	Reference
(United States) Keith Williams	(Poland) WKS Śląsk Wrocław	(Georgia (country)) Dinamo Tbilisi	1992–93	30	10	16	
(Russia) Vasily Karasev	(Russia) CSKA Moscow	(Greece) Olympiacos	1994–95	21	10	10	
(United States) Bill Edwards	(Greece) PAOK	(France) Cholet Basket	1999–00	24	15	10	
(United States) Derrick Phelps	(Germany) ALBA Berlin	(Greece) Iraklis	2000–01 SuproLeague	11	10	12	
(Croatia) Nikola Vujčić	(Israel) Maccabi Tel Aviv	(Poland) Prokom Trefl	2005–06	11	12	11	
(Croatia) Nikola Vujčić	(Israel) Maccabi Tel Aviv	(Slovenia) Olimpija Ljubljana	2006–07	27	10	10	
(Greece) Nick Calathes	(Greece) Panathinaikos	(Montenegro) Budućnost	2018–19	11	12	18	
(Bulgaria) Codi Miller-McIntyre	(Spain) Baskonia	(France) ASVEL	2023–24	11	11	20	

== Quadruple-double ==
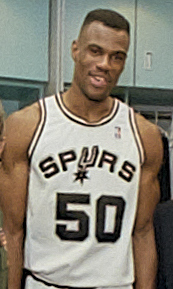
Center David Robinson is the most recent NBA player (1994) to accomplish the feat of a quadruple-double.

A quadruple-double is a single-game performance by a player who accumulates ten or more in four of five statistical categories—points, rebounds, assists, steals, and blocked shots—in a game. This feat is extremely rare: only four players have officially recorded a quadruple-double in National Basketball Association (NBA) history. The first American male player above the high school level to officially record a quadruple-double was Nate Thurmond, who achieved this feat in 1974 while playing for the NBA's Chicago Bulls. The first American female player above the high school level to officially record a quadruple-double was Ann Meyers, who achieved this feat in 1978 while playing for the UCLA Bruins, when women's college sports were under the auspices of the AIAW.

The first male player in NCAA Division I history to record a quadruple-double was Lester Hudson in 2007. The first Division I women's player to have officially recorded a quadruple-double since the NCAA began sponsoring women's sports in 1981–82 was Veronica Pettry of Loyola–Chicago in 1989. Only three other women have done so since, and the only player to have recorded a quadruple-double since 1993 is Shakyla Hill of Grambling State, who accomplished the feat in 2018 and 2019. An earlier player, Jackie Spencer of Louisville, accomplished the feat against Cincinnati during the 1984–85 season, but the NCAA did not record assists and steals throughout Division I women's basketball at that time. The Metro Conference, then home to both schools, did officially record these statistics, but the NCAA did not start doing so until 1985–86 for assists and 1987–88 for steals.

=== NBA ===
Quadruple-doubles have only been possible since the 1973–74 season, when the NBA started recording both blocked shots and steals. It is often speculated by observers that other all-time greats, namely Oscar Robertson (third in all-time triple-doubles with 181, behind Russell Westbrook and Nikola Jokic), Wilt Chamberlain, Bill Russell, and Jerry West could conceivably have had quadruple-doubles. West's biography at NBA.com claims that he once recorded an unofficial quadruple-double with 44 points, 12 rebounds, 10 assists, and 10 blocks. A biography of Wilt Chamberlain claims that he also recorded an unofficial quadruple-double in Game 1 of the 1967 Eastern Division Finals against the Boston Celtics, when he had 24 points, 32 rebounds, 13 assists, and 12 blocks.

The reason why [the quadruple-double] is such a hard thing to accomplish is because it requires a player to be completely dominant on both ends of the court without being too selfish—so he can get the assists—and without fouling out trying to block every shot or grab every rebound. A lot of guys can get the points, rebounds and assists, but it's the defensive stuff that messes everybody up. You have to love defense to get a quadruple-double. There's no way around it.

— Nate Thurmond

The four players listed below are the only players who have officially recorded a quadruple-double in an NBA game. Save Thurmond, who retired before the award was established in 1983, all of them have won NBA Defensive Player of the Year at least once. Alvin Robertson is the only player who was not a center to accomplish the feat, doing so with steals rather than blocks.

Legend
* : Inducted into the Naismith Memorial Basketball Hall of Fame

NBA quadruple-doubles
Name	Date	Team	Score	Opponent	Min	Points	Reb	Assists	Steals	Blocks	Overtime
Nate Thurmond*	October 18, 1974	Chicago Bulls	120–115	Atlanta Hawks	45	22	14	13	1	12	Yes
Alvin Robertson	February 18, 1986	San Antonio Spurs	120–114	Phoenix Suns	36	20	11	10	10	0	No
Hakeem Olajuwon*	March 29, 1990	Houston Rockets	120–94	Milwaukee Bucks	40	18	16	10	1	11	No
David Robinson*	February 17, 1994	San Antonio Spurs	115–96	Detroit Pistons	43	34	10	10	2	10	No

Only seven other players (Drexler did it twice) have managed to finish with triple-doubles and a total of 9 in a fourth statistical category (statistical categories in which they fell short are in bold):

NBA triple-doubles with nine of a fourth statistic
Name	Date	Team	Opponent	Minutes played	Points	Rebounds	Assists	Steals	Blocks	Overtime
Rick Barry*	October 29, 1974	Golden State Warriors	Buffalo Braves	43	30	10	11	**9**	—	No
Larry Steele	November 16, 1974	Portland Trail Blazers	Los Angeles Lakers	44	12	11	**9**	10	—	No
Johnny Moore	January 8, 1985	San Antonio Spurs	Golden State Warriors	36	26	11	13	**9**	—	No
Larry Bird*^{[a]}	February 18, 1985	Boston Celtics	Utah Jazz	33	30	12	10	**9**	—	No
Micheal Ray Richardson	October 30, 1985	New Jersey Nets	Indiana Pacers	54	38	11	11	**9**	—	Yes (3 OT)
Clyde Drexler*	January 10, 1986	Portland Trail Blazers	Milwaukee Bucks	42	26	**9**	11	10	—	No
Hakeem Olajuwon*^{[b]}	March 3, 1990	Houston Rockets	Golden State Warriors	40	29	18	**9**^{[b]}	5	11	No
Clyde Drexler*	November 1, 1996	Houston Rockets	Sacramento Kings	42	25	10	**9**	10	—	No

Notes

- **^{a}** Bird sat out the entire fourth quarter. After three quarters, head coach K. C. Jones informed Bird that he was one steal away from a quadruple-double and asked if he wanted to stay in the game. Bird declined, saying that he "already did enough damage."
- **^{b}** Olajuwon was credited with 9 assists in the original box score. However, after Rockets officials reviewed the game tape and discovered what they believe was an uncredited assist in the first quarter, they revised the box score, crediting Olajuwon with 10 assists and the third quadruple-double in NBA history. NBA director of operations Rod Thorn requested to review the tape. After reviewing the tape, the league disallowed Olajuwon's quadruple-double and announced that his original line–with 9 assists–is official.

=== Other men's basketball ===
League	Name	Date	Team	Opponent	Points	Rebounds	Assists	Steals	Blocks	Overtime	Reference
NJCAA	Clifford Wilson	February 14, 1979	Fulton-Montgomery	Hudson Valley	31	18	10	—	15	No	
French National League	Derrick Lewis^{[c]}	February 24, 1990	Reims	Lorient	20	11	—	12	10	No	
National Basketball League (Australia)	Daren Rowe^{[d]}	July 28, 1990	Geelong Supercats	North Melbourne Giants	25	17	11	—	11	No	
NJCAA	Monroe Pippins	February 9, 1995	Fulton-Montgomery	Herkimer	34	17	10	11	—	No	
NJCAA	Steve Francis	November 16, 1997	Allegany College of Maryland	Vincennes	24	10	11	10	—	—	
Metropolitan Basketball Association	Donbel Belano	August 14, 1999	Davao Eagles	Nueva Ecija Patriots	19	11	11	10	—	No	
Úrvalsdeild karla	Brenton Birmingham	March 16, 2000	Grindavík	Keflavík	17	14	10	10	—	No	
Úrvalsdeild karla	Brenton Birmingham	April 17, 2001	Njarðvík	Tindastóll	28	10	11	10	—	No	
Chinese Basketball Association	Hu Xuefeng	December 8, 2004	Jiangsu Dragons	Yunnan Bulls	16	10	12	10	—	No	
FIBA Europe Under-16 Championship	Ricky Rubio	August 19, 2006	Spain	Croatia	19	10	13	11	—	No	
American Basketball Association (2000–)	Jamel Staten	February 2, 2007	Minnesota Ripknees	St. Louis Stunners	17	11	11	10	—	No	
NCAA (Division I)	Lester Hudson^{[e]}	November 13, 2007	UT Martin	Central Baptist	25	12	10	10	1	No	
Continental Basketball Association	Jermaine Blackburn	December 20, 2008	East Kentucky Miners	West Virginia Wild	22	10	14	10	—	No	
High school boys	Jerrelle Benimon	February 17, 2009	Fauquier HS	Osbourn HS	13	17	11	—	10	No	
NCAA Juniors Division (Philippines)	Joshua Saret	July 23, 2009	JRU Light Bombers	AUF Baby Danes	89	11	12	13	—	No	
Chinese Basketball Association	Chris Williams	December 25, 2009	Qingdao Doublestar	Dongguan Leopards	15	11	11	11	—	No	
High school boys	Isaiah Grant	December 6, 2014	Sequoia Pathway Academy	Berean Academy	11	10	10	10	–	No	
Ukrainian First league	Vitaliy Bykov	December 17, 2016	BC Zaporizhya-2	BC Kramatorsk	14	13	11	12	—	No	
II Liga	Mariusz Konopatzki	February 18, 2017	Arka Gdynia	TKM Włocławek	10	12	10	10	—	No	
High school boys	Cameron Krutwig	March 10, 2017	Jacobs HS	Larkin HS	20	23	10	—	11	No	
Liga Super Basketball U-18	Natan Oliveira	April 8, 2017	Colégio Sul Americano	Rappers	32	11	10	16	—	No	
High school boys	Andres Frye	December 1, 2017	McLean School	Model Secondary School for the Deaf	13	10	10	10	—	No	
High school boys	Billy Whelan	February 2, 2018	Hamilton-Wenham HS	Manchester Essex HS	15	11	11	10	—	No	
High school boys	Romeo Weems	February 20, 2019	New Haven HS	Detroit Edison Public School Academy	34	12	—	10	10	No	
1. Regionalliga	Jonathan Braeger	March 12, 2022	Baskets Vilsbiburg	s.Oliver Würzburg Akademie	100	12	16	12	—	No	
Maharlika Pilipinas Basketball League	Kyt Jimenez	October 10, 2022	Sarangani Marlins	Mindoro Tams	33	13	11	11	1	No	
II Liga	Tomasz Nowakowski	December 10, 2022	Pogoń Prudnik	Team-Plast KK Oleśnica	11	13	10	—	10	No	
1. muška liga Republike Srpske	Filip Cvijetinović	December 16, 2023	Drina Princip Zvornik	Derventa	18	10	11	10	—	No	
American Basketball Association (2000–)	Yasim Hooker	October 26, 2024	Jersey Express	Dover Dawgs	20	11	10	10	4	No	

Notes

- **^{c}** This is the only quadruple-double in French National League history.
- **^{d}** This is the only quadruple-double in National Basketball League history.
- **^{e}** This is the only quadruple-double in NCAA Division I men's basketball history. The opponent, Central Baptist, plays in the NAIA.

=== Women's basketball ===
- United States college records mostly are accurate as of February 2019. NCAA records are complete for Divisions I and II, but not for Division III; specifically, entering the 2018–19 season, there have been a total of eight quadruple-doubles in Division III play, and one player, Suzy Venet of Mount Union (1994–1998), had two in her career, both in the 1996–97 season. NAIA records are also incomplete.

League	Name	Date	Team	Opponent	Points	Rebounds	Assists	Steals	Blocks	Reference
AIAW Division I	Ann Meyers	February 18, 1978	UCLA	Stephen F. Austin	20	14	10	10	—	
NCAA Division I	Jackie Spencer (Note: The NCAA does not consider Spencer's quadruple-double to be official. Although the Metro Conference, then home to both teams involved in this game, kept records in all of the relevant statistical categories in the 1984–85 season, the NCAA did not. Assists were not recorded throughout Division I women's basketball until 1985–86, and steals were not so recorded until 1987–88.)	February 2, 1985	Louisville	Cincinnati	14	12	14	10	—	
NAIA	Suzanne Gonzales (Note: Although Gonzales played for a school that is now a member of NCAA Division II, the NCAA does not consider her quadruple-double to be official for two reasons. First, the Rocky Mountain Athletic Conference, then as now home to both teams involved in this game, then competed in the National Association of Intercollegiate Athletics (NAIA), and was not an NCAA conference until 1992–93. In addition, the NCAA did not record steals throughout Division II women's basketball until 1992–93.)	February 11, 1989	Southern Colorado	Western State	13	12	10	11	—	
NCAA Division I	Veronica Pettry	March 4, 1989	Loyola (Chicago)	Detroit	12	10	22	11	—	
NCAA Division I	Ramona Jones	January 14, 1991	Lamar	UCF	10	10	10	12	—	
NCAA Division I	Sonja Tate	January 27, 1993	Arkansas State	Mississippi Valley State	29	14	10	10	—	
Úrvalsdeild kvenna	Penny Peppas	October 15, 1996	Grindavík	ÍR	52	16	11	10	—	
American Basketball League	Debbie Black	December 8, 1996	Colorado Xplosion	Atlanta Glory	10	14	12	10	—	
NCAA Division II	Tereska Watkins	February 8, 1997	Fort Valley State	unknown	12	12	10	10	—	
North West Basketball Union (Australia)	Tricia Bader Binford	1997	Latrobe Demons	unknown	67	10	14	10	—	
NCAA Division III	Katherine Santiago	December 7, 1999	Lehman	SUNY-Purchase	23	10	13	12	—	
Russian Premier League	Maria Kalmykova	January 21, 2001	Chevakata Vologda	Dynamo Kursk	20	15	11	—	11	
European U16 Championship	Anastasiya Verameyenka	April 20, 2003	Belarus U16	Czech U16	21	10	—	10	12	
1. deild kvenna	Helena Sverrisdóttir (Note: During the 2003-2004 1. deild kvenna season, Helena averaged a quadruple-double with 37.6 points, 13.3 rebounds, 11.6 assists and 10.2 steals. Out of the 16 games she played, she posted a quadruple-double in six of them.)	October 17, 2003	Haukar	Breiðablik	37	15	10	10	—	
1. deild kvenna	Helena Sverrisdóttir	October 30, 2003	Haukar	Hamar	41	11	15	11	—	
1. deild kvenna	Helena Sverrisdóttir	November 18, 2003	Haukar	Laugdælir	24	12	10	11	—	
1. deild kvenna	Helena Sverrisdóttir	December 14, 2003	Haukar	Hrunamenn	38	11	15	13	—	
NCAA Division III	Evita Esteves	February 5, 2004	Emmanuel (MA)	Johnson & Wales	10	10	11	13	—	
1. deild kvenna	Helena Sverrisdóttir	February 8, 2004	Haukar	Breiðablik	41	12	13	14	—	
1. deild kvenna	Helena Sverrisdóttir	March 27, 2004	Haukar	Hrunamenn	45	20	20	10	—	
Úrvalsdeild kvenna	Reshea Bristol	November 10, 2005	Keflavík	Grindavík	30	16	10	10	—	
NCAA Division III	Danna Purnell	February 10, 2007	SUNY-Old Westbury	New Rochelle	14	10	11	13	—	
NCAA Division III	Latiqua Williams	November 16, 2008	Bard	New Rochelle	21	13	10	11	—	
Israeli Premier League	Edwina Brown	December 2008	Ramat Hen	Hapoel Holon	22	10	10	10	—	
Greek A1 Ethniki	Zoi Dimitrakou	March 22, 2009	G.S. Megas Alexandros	Aris Holargou	49	18	10	12	—	
Icelandic Company Cup	Heather Ezell	September 25, 2009	Haukar	Njarðvík	24	13	10	10	—	
Úrvalsdeild kvenna	Heather Ezell	January 9, 2010	Haukar	Valur	25	15	11	10	—	
Ukrainian SuperLeague	Alina Iagupova	May 15, 2011	BC Dnipro	Luhanski Lastivky	28	15	13	10	—	Stats
FIBA U16 European Championship	Ana Ferariu	August 7, 2013	Romania U16	Ireland U16	23	12	10	10	—	Stats
High School girls	Aminata Ly	December 12, 2017	Greenforest Academy	W.D. Mohammed	23	16	—	11	14	
Úrvalsdeild kvenna	Kristen McCarthy	December 3, 2017	Snæfell	Njarðvík	31	15	10	12	—	
NCAA Division I	Shakyla Hill	January 3, 2018	Grambling State	Alabama State	15	10	10	10	—	
1. deild kvenna	Sylvía Rún Hálfdánardóttir	January 5, 2019	Þór Akureyri	Njarðvík	11	13	10	10	—	
NCAA Division I	Shakyla Hill	February 2, 2019	Grambling State	Arkansas–Pine Bluff	21	16	13	10	—	
First Women's Basketball League of Serbia	Shakyla Hill	January 25, 2020	ŽKK Kraljevo	Partizan 1953	15	10	11	11	—	
1. deild kvenna	Jordan Danberry	November 8, 2023	Aþena	ÍR	40	13	12	17	—	
Icelandic Cup	Randi Keonsha Brow	December 7, 2024	Tindastóll	Selfoss	31	15	12	10	—	
Women's Maharlika Pilipinas Basketball League	Stefanie Berberabe	August 24, 2025	Tagaytay 'Tol Patriots	Pangasinan Solar Home Suns	20	15	10	10	—	
Kvindebasketligaen	Rim Taha	November 1, 2025	SISU Basketball	BMS Herlev	17	14	16	11	—	

== Quintuple-double ==
A quintuple-double is a single-game performance by a player who accumulates double-digits in all five statistical categories—points, rebounds, assists, steals, and blocked shots—in a single game. No officially recognized quintuple-doubles have ever occurred in professional basketball, although Wilt Chamberlain is believed to have achieved at least one quintuple-double during the 1967-68 NBA season. On March 18, 1968, Chamberlain unofficially accumulated 53 points, 32 rebounds, 24 blocks, 14 assists and 11 steals for the Philadelphia 76ers in a 158-128 win over the Los Angeles Lakers. Statistician Harvey Pollack, who attended the game and recorded Chamberlain's statistics, suggested that Chamberlain may have achieved additional unrecorded quintuple-doubles as well. There are also six known officially recorded quintuple-doubles, almost entirely done at the girls' high-school level. The first was recorded by Tamika Catchings of Duncanville High School (Duncanville, Texas) with 25 points, 18 rebounds, 11 assists, 10 steals, and 10 blocks in 1997. The second was by Alex Montgomery of Lincoln High School (Tacoma, Washington), who had 27 points, 22 rebounds, 10 assists, 10 steals, and 10 blocks in January 2007. The third was by Aimee Oertner of Northern Lehigh High School (Slatington, Pennsylvania), who had 26 points, 20 rebounds, 10 assists, 10 steals, and 11 blocks on January 7, 2012. On February 23, 2024, Kieonna Christmas of Fonda-Fultonville High School (Fonda, New York), had 11 points, 20 rebounds, 11 assists, 10 steals, and 10 blocks. Kira Reynolds of South Bend Washington High School (South Bend, Indiana), recorded 14 points, 18 rebounds, 12 assists, 11 steals, and 10 blocks on January 6, 2025. The most recent was completed by F. Welander in a high-school game in Norwich, United Kingdom.

As of January 2023, there is no overlap between the 14 players who have recorded 10+ steals in an NBA game and the 36 players who have recorded 10+ blocks in a game; in other words, no NBA player's career-high stat line is a quintuple-double. The best single-game career high in blocks for a player with a game of 10+ steals is 5 by Draymond Green, and the best single-game career high in steals for a player with a game of 10+ blocks is 8 (Andrei Kirilenko and Hakeem Olajuwon).

== Five-by-five ==
A five-by-five is a performance in which a player accumulates a total of five in five statistical categories—points, rebounds, assists, steals, and blocks—in a single game. Statistics for steals and blocks were not kept in the NBA until the 1973–74 season, so all NBA five-by-fives are known only from that season onward. Hakeem Olajuwon (six times), Andrei Kirilenko (three times), and Victor Wembanyama (two times) are the only players to have recorded multiple five-by-fives (based on records since the 1984–85 season). Olajuwon and Kirilenko are also the only players to record six-by-fives (at least six in all five statistical categories). Only twice has a five-by-five coincided with a triple-double (both by Olajuwon, one of which was 1 assist shy of a quadruple-double) and only three times has a player recorded a five-by-five without registering at least a double-double (two by Kirilenko and one by Marcus Camby).

=== Facts ===
All facts based on data since the 1985–86 season:

- Greatest five-by-fives (most of each stat): Hakeem Olajuwon, on March 10, 1987, became the first in NBA history to record a six-by-five (at least 6 each of all five statistics: points, rebounds, assists, blocks, steals). It took nearly twenty years for the second official occurrence in NBA history. Andrei Kirilenko, on January 3, 2006, recorded a six-by-five against the Lakers.
- Most five-by-fives in a career: Hakeem Olajuwon leads all players with 6 career five-by-fives. Andrei Kirilenko, with 3, and Victor Wembanyama, with 2, are the only other players with more than one career five-by-five.
- Most five-by-fives in the same season: Only twice has a player recorded at least two five-by-fives in a season. Olajuwon with three in the 1993–94 season, and Kirilenko with two in the 2003–04 season.
- Quickest pair of five-by-fives: Kirilenko performed a five-by-five on December 3, 2003, and completed another just a week later, on December 10, 2003. The second-quickest five-by-fives were completed by Olajuwon on November 5, 1993, and another, 55 days later, on December 30, 1993.
- Quickest to reach a five-by-five in a game: Victor Wembanyama in 30 minutes and 55 seconds vs the Los Angeles Lakers on February 23, 2024
- Youngest player: Wembanyama is the youngest player to record a five-by-five, which he did on February 23, 2024 when he was 20 years, 50 days of age.
- Oldest player: Olajuwon is the oldest player to record a five-by-five. His last career five-by-five came on December 30, 1993, at which time he was 30 years, 343 days old.

== See also ==
- NBA records
- WNBA records
