= 2017–18 Grambling State Tigers women's basketball team =

Intercollegiate basketball season

2017–18 Grambling State Tigers women's basketball

SWAC Tournament Champions

NCAA Women's Tournament, first round
- Conference: Southwestern Athletic Conference
- Record: 19–13 (13–5 SWAC)
- Head coach: Freddie Murray (1st season)
- Assistant coaches: Isayra Diaz; David Pierre
- Home arena: Fredrick C. Hobdy Assembly Center (Capacity: 6,500)

2017–18 SWAC women's basketball standings
| | Conf. | | | | Overall |
| Team | W | | L | PCT | W | | L | PCT |
|---|---|---|---|---|---|---|---|---|
| Southern | 14 | – | 4 | .778 | 17 | – | 13 | .567 |
| Texas Southern | 13 | – | 5 | .722 | 19 | – | 12 | .613 |
| Grambling State † | 13 | – | 5 | .722 | 19 | – | 13 | .594 |
| Prairie View A&M | 12 | – | 6 | .667 | 15 | – | 16 | .484 |
| Jackson State | 10 | – | 8 | .556 | 15 | – | 13 | .536 |
| Alcorn State | 8 | – | 10 | .444 | 12 | – | 18 | .400 |
| Alabama A&M | 6 | – | 12 | .333 | 11 | – | 18 | .379 |
| Arkansas-Pine Bluff | 6 | – | 12 | .333 | 8 | – | 21 | .276 |
| Alabama State | 6 | – | 12 | .333 | 8 | – | 22 | .267 |
| Mississippi Valley State | 2 | – | 16 | .111 | 2 | – | 28 | .067 |
† 2018 SWAC tournament winner Rankings from AP poll

The 2017–18 Grambling State Lady Tigers basketball team represented Grambling State University in the 2017-18 NCAA Division I women's basketball season. They were led by new coach Freddie Murray, who was promoted to interim and then hired full-time after former coach Nadine Domond departed to become an assistant coach at Rutgers.

On January 3, 2018, Shakyla Hill became the fourth player in NCAA Division I history (men's and women's) to record a quadruple-double; it had not been done since Lester Hudson did it in 2007. In the Lady Tigers' 93–71 win over the Alabama A&M Lady Bulldogs, Hill recorded 15 points, 10 rebounds, 10 assists, and 10 steals.

== Roster ==
2017–18 Grambling State Tigers women's basketball team
Players
Coaches

| Pos. | # | Name | Height | Year | Previous school | Hometown |
|---|---|---|---|---|---|---|
| G | 3 | Takerra Parsons | 5 ft 9 in (1.75 m) | Jr | Bayside HS | Virginia Beach, VA |
| G | 4 | Monisha Neal | 5 ft 9 in (1.75 m) | Sr | Lewisville HS | Lewisville, TX |
| G | 5 | Shakyla Hill | 5 ft 7 in (1.7 m) | Jr | Hall HS | Little Rock, AR |
| G | 11 | Ariel Williams | 5 ft 9 in (1.75 m) | Fr | Whitehaven HS | Memphis, TN |
| G | 12 | Justice Coleman | 5 ft 10 in (1.78 m) | Fr | Scotlandville HS | Baton Rouge, LA |
| G | 13 | Jazmin Boyd | 5 ft 8 in (1.73 m) | Jr | Hattiesburg HS | Hattiesburg, MS |
| F | 20 | Jazmine Torian | 6 ft 0 in (1.83 m) | Sr | Coffeyville CC | Clarksville, TN |
| G | 22 | Deja McKinney | 5 ft 10 in (1.78 m) | RS So | Ville Platte HS | Ville Platte, LA |
| G | 23 | Darae Taylor | 5 ft 7 in (1.7 m) | Jr | East St. John HS | Reserve, LA |
| F | 30 | Alexus Williams | 6 ft 0 in (1.83 m) | Fr | Whitehaven HS | Memphis, TN |
| F | 32 | Hannah Henderson | 6 ft 0 in (1.83 m) | So | Ooltewah HS | Chattanooga, TN |
| F | 33 | Kailyn Gideon | 6 ft 3 in (1.91 m) | Jr | Pasadena City College | Los Angeles, CA |

Head coach

Freddie Murray (Jackson State '90)

Assistant coach(es)

- Isayra Diaz (Shaw '14)
- David Pierre (Grambling State '05)

Legend

- (C) Team captain
- (S) Suspended
- (I) Ineligible
- (W) Walk-on
- Injured
- Current redshirt

Roster
Last update: January 17, 2018

== Schedule ==
| Date time, TV | Rank^{#} | Opponent^{#} | Result | Record | High points | High rebounds | High assists | Site (attendance) city, state |
Non-conference regular season
| November 10*; 11:00 a.m. | | at Louisiana Tech | L 53–64 | 0–1 | 12 – Hill | 7 – Hill | 6 – Hill | Thomas Assembly Center (4,811); Ruston, LA |
| November 13*; 6:00 p.m. | | Louisiana–Monroe | W 61–52 | 1–1 | 18 – Hill | 8 – Neal | 5 – Neal | Fredrick C. Hobdy Assembly Center (1,229); Grambling, LA |
| November 16*; 7:00 p.m. | | at Xavier | L 67–72 | 1–2 | 21 – McKinney | 6 – Hill | 10 – Hill | Cintas Center (705); Cincinnati, OH |
| November 19*; 4:00 p.m. | | No. 17 Florida State | L 53–96 | 1–3 | 17 – McKinney | 2 – 6 tied | 4 – Boyd | Fredrick C. Hobdy Assembly Center (661); Grambling, LA |
| November 22*; 1:00 p.m. | | at McNeese State | W 75–60 | 2–3 | 18 – Boyd | 8 – Parsons | 6 – Hill | Burton Coliseum (796); Lake Charles, LA |
| November 30*; 6:00 p.m. | | Southeastern Louisiana | W 61–52 | 3–3 | 18 – Boyd | 5 – Boyd | 3 – Hill | Fredick C. Hobdy Assembly Center (451); Grambling, LA |
| December 10*; 2:00 p.m. | | at Alabama | L 49–73 | 3–4 | 26 – Hill | 13 – Hill | 4 – Hill | Coleman Coliseum (2,009); Tuscaloosa, AL |
| December 16*; 3:00 p.m. | | at Arkansas State | L 56–76 | 3–5 | 15 – Hill | 10 – Gideon | 6 – Neal | First National Bank Arena (587); Jonesboro, AR |
| December 19*; 1:00 p.m. | | vs. North Carolina; Carolinas Challenge | L 63–79 | 3–6 | 20 – Hill | 7 – Hill | 6 – Hill | Myrtle Beach Convention Center (500); Myrtle Beach, SC |
| December 21*; 12:00 p.m. | | at Memphis | L 48–57 | 3–7 | 11 – Torian | 8 – Hill | 6 – Hill | Elma Roane Fieldhouse (438); Memphis, TN |
| December 28*; 7:00 p.m. | | at Arkansas | L 62–79 | 3–8 | 16 – Ar. Williams | 7 – Neal | 3 – Ar. Williams | Bud Walton Arena (1,388); Fayetteville, AR |
SWAC regular season
| January 1; 12:00 p.m. | | Alabama A&M | W 78–49 | 4–8 (1–0) | 14 – Hill | 9 – Neal | 7 – Hill | Fredrick C. Hobdy Assembly Center (189); Grambling, LA |
| January 3; 5:30 p.m. | | Alabama State | W 93–71 | 5–8 (2–0) | 20 – McKinney | 10 – Hill | 10 – Hill | Fredrick C. Hobdy Assembly Center (250); Grambling, LA |
| January 6; 3:00 p.m. | | at Southern | L 44–63 | 5–9 (2–1) | 18 – Hill | 12 – Hill | 3 – Coleman | F. G. Clark Center (908); Baton Rouge, LA |
| January 8; 5:30 p.m. | | at Alcorn State | W 75–68 | 6–9 (3–1) | 16 – Hill | 9 – Gideon | 6 – Hill | Davey Whitney Complex (591); Lorman, MS |
| January 13; 3:00 p.m. | | Prairie View A&M | W 81–79 ^{OT} | 7–9 (4–1) | 24 – Hill | 9 – Neal | 8 – Hill | Fredrick C. Hobdy Assembly Center (515); Grambling, LA |
| January 15; 5:30 p.m. | | Texas Southern | L 63–73 | 7–10 (4–2) | 13 – Boyd | 4 – 2 tied | 4 – Neal | Fredrick C. Hobdy Assembly Center (615); Grambling, LA |
| January 20; 5:30 p.m. | | at Jackson State | L 70–82 | 7–11 (4–3) | 16 – Neal | 12 – Neal | 6 – Hill | Williams Assembly Center (1,979); Jackson, MS |
| January 27; 5:00 p.m. | | at Arkansas–Pine Bluff | W 66–57 | 8–11 (5–3) | 11 – 2 tied | 9 – Hill | 6 – Hill | K. L. Johnson Complex (916); Pine Bluff, AR |
| January 29; 5:30 p.m. | | at Mississippi Valley State | W 64–62 | 9–11 (6–3) | 20 – Hill | 9 – Hill | 7 – Hill | Harrison HPER Complex (2,401); Itta Bena, MS |
| February 3; 3:00 p.m. | | Southern | W 79–71 | 10–11 (7–3) | 18 – Neal | 9 – Hill | 7 – Hill | Fredrick C. Hobdy Assembly Center (3,875); Grambling, MS |
| February 5; 5:30 p.m. | | Alcorn State | W 68–51 | 11–11 (8–3) | 22 – Hill | 7 – Gideon | 6 – Hill | Fredrick C. Hobdy Assembly Center (1,109); Grambling, LA |
| February 10; 3:00 p.m. | | at Prairie View A&M | W 75–68 | 12–11 (9–3) | 26 – Hill | 10 – Neal | 4 – Neal | William J. Nicks Building (324); Prairie View, TX |
| February 12; 5:30 p.m. | | at Texas Southern | L 56–66 | 12–12 (9–4) | 17 – Hill | 9 – Gideon | 4 – 2 Tied | H&PE Arena (1,018); Houston, TX |
| February 17; 3:00 p.m. | | Jackson State | W 93–89 ^{OT} | 13–12 (10–4) | 31 – Boyd | 7 – 2 tied | 11 – Hill | Fredrick C. Hobdy Assembly Center (1,127); Grambling, LA |
| February 24; 3:00 p.m. | | Arkansas–Pine Bluff | W 73–63 | 14–12 (11–4) | 22 – Hill | 9 – Hill | 11 – Hill | Fredrick C. Hobdy Assembly Center (934); Grambling, LA |
| February 26; 5:30 p.m. | | Mississippi Valley State | W 64–55 | 15–12 (12–4) | 21 – Hill | 10 – Hill | 6 – Hill | Fredrick C. Hobdy Assembly Center (836); Grambling, LA |
| March 1; 5:30 p.m. | | at Alabama A&M | L 64–71 | 15–13 (12–5) | 35 – Hill | 12 – Hill | 4 – Hill | Elmore Gymnasium; Huntsville, AL |
| March 3; 3:00 p.m. | | at Alabama State | W 73–52 | 16–13 (13–5) | 29 – Hill | 13 – Neal | 3 – Hill | Dunn–Oliver Acadome; Montgomery, AL |
SWAC Women's Tournament
| March 6; 6:30 p.m. | (3) | (6) Alcorn State; Quarterfinals | W 80–71 | 17–13 | 30 – Hill | 6 – Neal | 6 – Hill | Fredrick C. Hobdy Assembly Center (1,300); Grambling, LA |
| March 9; 6:00 p.m. | (3) | vs. (2) Texas Southern; Semifinals | W 66–59 | 18–13 | 19 – Boyd | 14 – Neal | 9 – Hill | Delmar Fieldhouse (1,800); Houston, TX |
| March 10; 3:00 p.m., ESPN3 | (3) | vs. (1) Southern; Championship Game | W 72–68 | 19–13 | 27 – Hill | 10 – Hill | 5 – Hill | Delmar Fieldhouse (1,993); Houston, TX |
NCAA Women's Tournament
| March 16*; 6:30 p.m., ESPN2 | (15 L) | at (2 L) No. 2 Baylor; First Round | L 46–96 | 19–14 | 20 – Boyd | 6 – Hill | 4 – Hill | Ferrell Center (4,933); Waco, TX |
*Non-conference game. ^{#}Rankings from AP Poll. (#) Tournament seedings in parentheses. L=Lexington Region. All times are in Central.

- Schedule source:

== See also ==
- 2017–18 Grambling State Tigers men's basketball team
