= 2018 SWAC women's basketball tournament =

- Classification: Division I
- Season: 2017–18
- Teams: 8
- Site: Delmar Fieldhouse; Houston, Texas
- First round site: Campus sites
- Champions: Grambling State (7th title)
- Winning coach: Freddie Murray (1st title)
- Television: ESPN3

2017–18 SWAC women's basketball standings
	Conf.				Overall
Team	W		L	PCT	W		L	PCT
Southern	14	–	4	.778	17	–	13	.567
Texas Southern	13	–	5	.722	19	–	12	.613
Grambling State †	13	–	5	.722	19	–	13	.594
Prairie View A&M	12	–	6	.667	15	–	16	.484
Jackson State	10	–	8	.556	15	–	13	.536
Alcorn State	8	–	10	.444	12	–	18	.400
Alabama A&M	6	–	12	.333	11	–	18	.379
Arkansas-Pine Bluff	6	–	12	.333	8	–	21	.276
Alabama State	6	–	12	.333	8	–	22	.267
Mississippi Valley State	2	–	16	.111	2	–	28	.067
† 2018 SWAC tournament winner Rankings from AP poll

The 2018 SWAC women's basketball tournament is an event which took place March 6–10, 2018. Tournament quarterfinal games were held at campus sites, hosted by the higher seed, on March 6. The semifinals and championship are at Delmar Fieldhouse in Houston. The winner, Gambling State, received the Southwestern Athletic Conference's automatic bid to the 2018 NCAA Women's Division I Basketball Championship.

== Seeds ==
2018 SWAC Women's Basketball Tournament seeds
Seed	School	Conference	Overall	Tiebreaker
1.	Southern	14–4	17–13	
2.	Texas Southern	13–5	19–12	
3.	Grambling State	13–5	19–13	
4.	Prairie View A&M	12–6	15–16	
5.	Jackson State	10–8	15–13	
6.	Alcorn State	8–10	12–18	
7.	Alabama State	6–12	8–22	
8.	Arkansas-Pine Bluff	6–12	8–21	

== Bracket ==
Quarterfinals; Tuesday, March 6
3	Grambling State	80
6	Alcorn State	71
2	Texas Southern	70
7	Alabama State	42
1	Southern	70
8	Arkansas–Pine Bluff	60
4	Prairie View A&M	66
5	Jackson State	65

Semifinals; Friday, March 9
3	Grambling State	66
2	Texas Southern	59
1	Southern	84
4	Prairie View A&M	76

Championship; Saturday, March 10; ESPN3
3	Grambling State	72
1	Southern	68

== See also ==
- 2018 SWAC men's basketball tournament
