= Marina Ristić =

Serbian politician

Marina Ristić (Serbian Cyrillic: Марина Ристић; born 1974) is a politician in Serbia. She served in the National Assembly of Serbia from 2016 to 2020 as a member of the far-right Serbian Radical Party.

== Private career ==
Ristić is an administrative worker based in Belgrade.

== Political career ==
Ristić was included on the Radical Party's electoral lists in the 2012 and 2014 Serbian parliamentary elections. The party did not cross the electoral threshold to win representation in the assembly on either occasion.

She received the twelfth position on the Radical Party's electoral list in the 2016 parliamentary election and was on this occasion elected when the list won twenty-two mandates. In parliament, Ristić was a member of the assembly committee on spatial planning, transport, infrastructure, and telecommunications; a deputy member of the foreign affairs committee, the health and family committee, and the committee on the rights of the child; a deputy member of Serbia's delegation to the Parliamentary Assembly of the Mediterranean; and a member of the parliamentary friendship groups with Cyprus and Morocco.
