= Paulina Hersler =

Swedish basketball player (born 1994)

Personal information
- Born: 16 May 1994 (age 32) Sweden
- Listed height: 190 cm (6 ft 3 in)

Career information
- College: UCLA (2013–2017); Florida (2017–2018)
- Position: Power forward / center

Career history
- 2010–2013: Telge Basket
- 2018–2019: Stadium Casablanca
- 2021–2022: Elizur Ramla
- 2022–2023: London Lions
- 2023: Hapoel Petah Tiqva
- 2023–2024: Estudiantes Madrid
- 2025–2026: Njarðvík

Career highlights
- 2× Damligan champion (2011, 2012); Icelandic champion (2026); Icelandic Cup (2025)

Paulina Frida Lovisa Hersler (born 16 May 1994) is Swedish basketball player and a member of the Sweden national team. During her career, she has played in Egypt, United Kingdom, Spain, Israel, Italy, Slovenia, Sweden, Turkey and USA. During her career, she has won the Swedish national championship twice, and the Icelandic championship once.

== Playing career ==
=== Iceland ===
In January 2025, Hersler signed with Njarðvík in the Icelandic Úrvalsdeild kvenna. In March, she helped the club win the national cup after defeating Grindavík in the cup final where she had 25 points and 9 rebounds. During the regular season, she averaged 22.3 points, 8.2 rebounds and 3.0 assists. She helped Njarðvík reach the Úrvalsdeild finals where the team lost 2–3. At the end of May, she resigned with Njarðvík for the 2025–2026 season.

On 17 May 2026, she won the Icelandic championship for the first time.

== Personal life ==
Hersler's father, Bengt Hersler, played basketball for 12 years.
