= Radoslava Bachvarova =

Bulgarian female basketball player

No. 10 – Trith-Saint-Leger
- Position: Shooting guard
- League: NF1 France

Personal information
- Born: 19 January 1987 (age 39) Ruse, Bulgaria
- Listed height: 1.83 m (6 ft 0 in)
- Listed weight: 74 kg (163 lb)

Career information
- College: VCU
- WNBA draft: 2009: undrafted
- Playing career: 2007–2024

Career history
- 2004–2005: Ušće Novi Beograd
- 2007–2009: VCU
- 2009–2011: Dunav Ruse
- 2011: Levski Sofia
- 2011–2012: Saint-Amand Hainaut Basket
- 2012–2013: ASPTT Arras
- 2013: Levski Sofia
- 2014: DJK Brose Bamberg
- 2014: Edirne Belediyesi
- 2015: COB Calais
- 2015–2016: BC Beroe
- 2016–2017: Vasas
- 2017–2018: U Cluj-Napoca
- 2018–2020: BC Beroe
- 2020–2021: BCMF Montbrison
- 2021-2024: CO Trith Porte du Hainaut

Radoslava Bachvarova (Bulgarian: Радослава Бъчварова) (born 19 January 1987) is a former Bulgarian female basketball player. Bachvarova graduated from Virginia Commonwealth University in 2009. She was a member of the Bulgarian National team.
