= Jovana Stojanović =

Serbian footballer (born 1995)

Personal information
- Date of birth: 10 February 1995 (age 31)
- Position: Defender

International career^{‡}
Years	Team	Apps	(Gls)
- Serbia
- ‡ National team caps and goals as of 19:48, 30 August 2019 (UTC)

Jovana Stojanović (Serbian Cyrillic: Јована Стојановић; born 10 February 1995) is a Serbian footballer who plays as a defender and has appeared for the Serbia women's national team.

== Career ==
Stojanović has been capped for the Serbia national team, appearing for the team during the 2019 FIFA Women's World Cup qualifying cycle.
