= Shakyla Hill =

American basketball player

Personal information
- Born: December 14, 1996 (age 29) Jacksonville, Arkansas
- Listed height: 5 ft 7 in (1.70 m)

Career information
- High school: Hall High School (Little Rock, Arkansas)
- College: Grambling State (2015–2019)
- WNBA draft: 2019: undrafted
- Position: Point guard
- Number: 2

Career history
- 2019–2020: ŽKK Kraljevo
- 2022: Bashkimi Prizren

Career highlights
- Serbian Cup winner (2020); Kosovo Cup (2022); WABA League Defensive Player of Year (2020); WABA League Defensive All-First Team (2020); WABA League Defensive First Team (2020); ZLS steals leader (2020)

Shakyla Denise Hill (born December 14, 1996) is an American basketball player. She played college basketball for Grambling State where she became the first woman to record two quadruple-double's over her career. She later went on to play professionally in Serbia where she recorded the first quadruple-double in the ZLS's history.

== College career ==
Hill played for Grambling State University from 2015 to 2019. On January 4, 2018, she recorded a quadruple-double, the first one in the NCAA for 25 years, with 15 points, 10 rebounds, 10 assists, and 10 steals. On February 3, 2019, she posted the second quadruple-double of her career with 21 points, 16 rebounds, 13 assists, and 10 steals in a victory against over Arkansas-Pine Bluff.

== Professional career ==
After going undrafted in the 2019 WNBA draft, Hill signed with Serbian club ŽKK Kraljevo of the First Women's Basketball League of Serbia (ZLS) and the regional WABA League in September 2019. On January 26, 2020, she posted another quadruple-double, the first in ZLS history, with 15 points, 10 rebounds, 10 assists and 10 steals against KZK Partizan. In March 2020, she helped Kraljevo win the Milan Ciga Vasojević Cup. Kraljevo had a 17–1 record when the rest of the 2019–20 ZLS season was canceled due to the COVID-19 pandemic in Serbia. In the ZLS league, she averaged 13.3 points, 8.1 rebounds, 6.3 assists and 5.7 steals per game. In the WABA League, she averaged 14.3 points, 6.4 rebounds, 6.1 assists and 4.2 steals per game.

In January 2022, Hill joined Bashkimi Prizren of the Kosovo Women's Basketball Superleague. In February, she won the Kosovo Cup.

== Statistics ==
=== College statistics ===
Legend
GP	Games played	GS	Games started	MPG	Minutes per game
FG%	Field goal percentage	3P%	3-point field goal percentage	FT%	Free throw percentage
RPG	Rebounds per game	APG	Assists per game	SPG	Steals per game
BPG	Blocks per game	PPG	Points per game	**Bold**	Career high

Year	Team	GP	Points	FG%	3P%	FT%	RPG	APG	SPG	BPG	PPG
2015–16	Grambling	31	401	**57.4%**	**40.0%**	64.5%	5.8	3.0	2.8	0.1	12.9
2016–17	Grambling	**34**	511	48.2%	27.6%	62.7%	**7.8**	4.2	3.0	0.1	15.0
2017–18	Grambling	33	556	45.9%	22.4%	**69.8%**	7.5	5.7	**4.8**	0.3	16.8
2018–19	Grambling	32	**605**	42.3%	24.3%	69.4%	7.6	**6.3**	4.6	**0.3**	**18.9**
Career		130	2073	47.3%	25.7%	67.1%	7.2	4.8	3.8	0.2	15.9
