= Jaklin Zlatanova =

Bulgarian basketball player

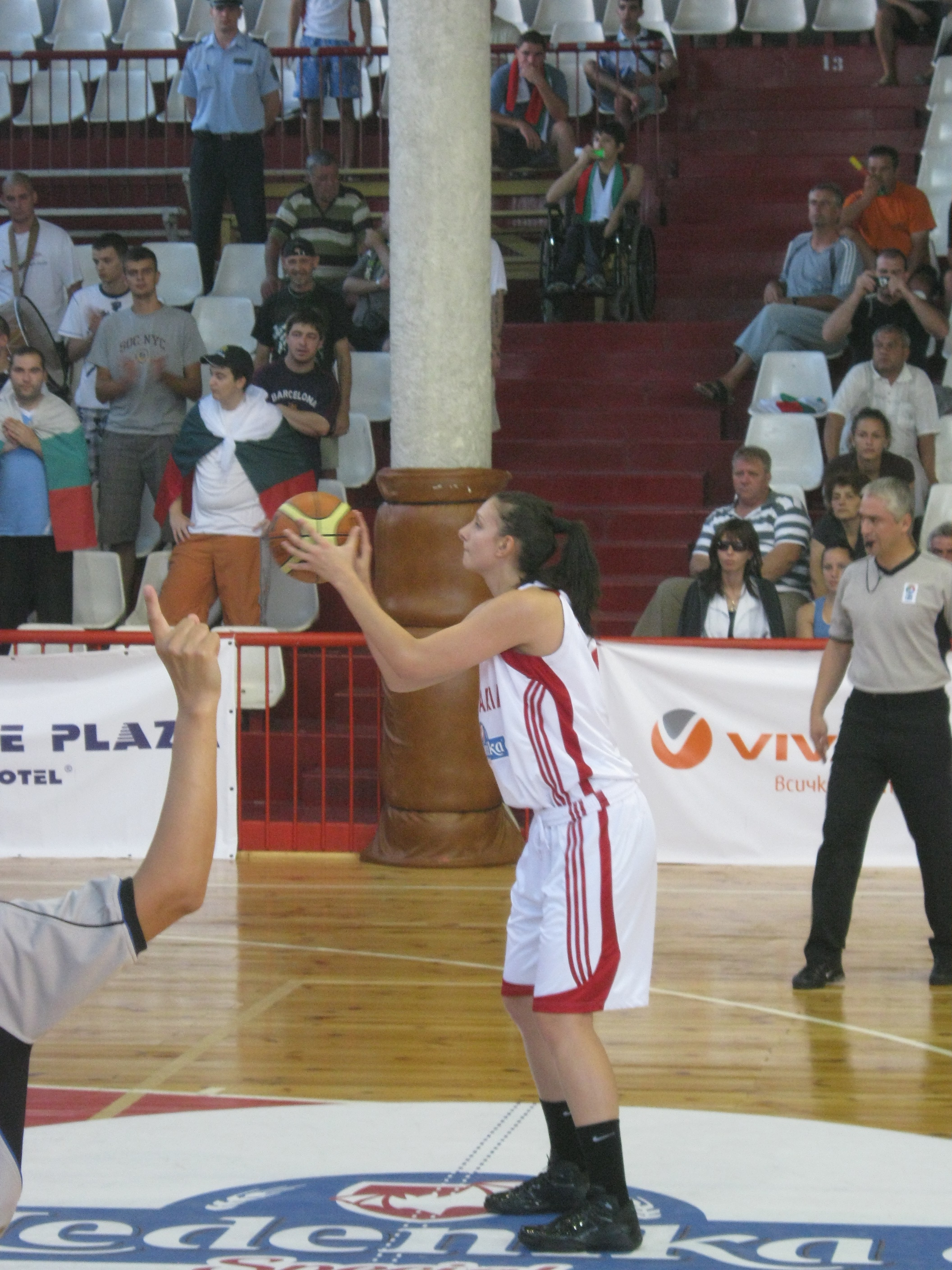
- Jaklin Zlatanova with the national team during the Qualifications for the European Championships in 2010.

No. 7 – WBC Beroe
- Position: Power forward
- League: Bulgaria

Personal information
- Born: 25 September 1988 (age 38) Sofia, PR Bulgaria
- Listed height: 1.88 m (6 ft 2 in)

Career information
- Playing career: 2006–present

Career history
- 2000–2003: Levski Sofia
- 2003–2004: Rilski Sportist Samakov
- 2004–2008: Tarbes Gespe Bigorre
- 2008–2009: Extragusa Vilagarcía
- 2009–2010: Gran Canaria
- 2010–2011: Mann Filter Zaragoza
- 2012–2013: Rivas Ecópolis
- 2013–2015: Dunav Ruse
- 2015–2016: Stadium Casablanca
- 2017-2018: Stadium Casablanca
- 2019-2020: WBC Beroe
- 2020-2021: WBC Beroe

Career highlights
- Spanish Cup Champion (2013); Bulgarian Women's Basketball League Champion (2013, 2014, 2015, 2019)

Jaklin Dencheva Zlatanova (Bulgarian: Жаклин Денчева Златанова, born 25 September 1988) is a Bulgarian female basketball player currently competing for WBC Beroe in the Bulgarian League. Zlatanova is considered to be among the most talented athletes in the country which in the past used to be among the most successful nations in the European female basketball.

Jaklin Zlatanova was born on 25 September 1988 in the capital Sofia, where she spent most of her childhood in the family with long-run basketball tradition. Her mother Krassimira Banova had been a very successful basketball player, and with the team of Levski(Sofia) she won Euro league competition in 1984, Ronchetti cup in 1979 and other awards as well before she retired.

== National team: 2003–2021 ==
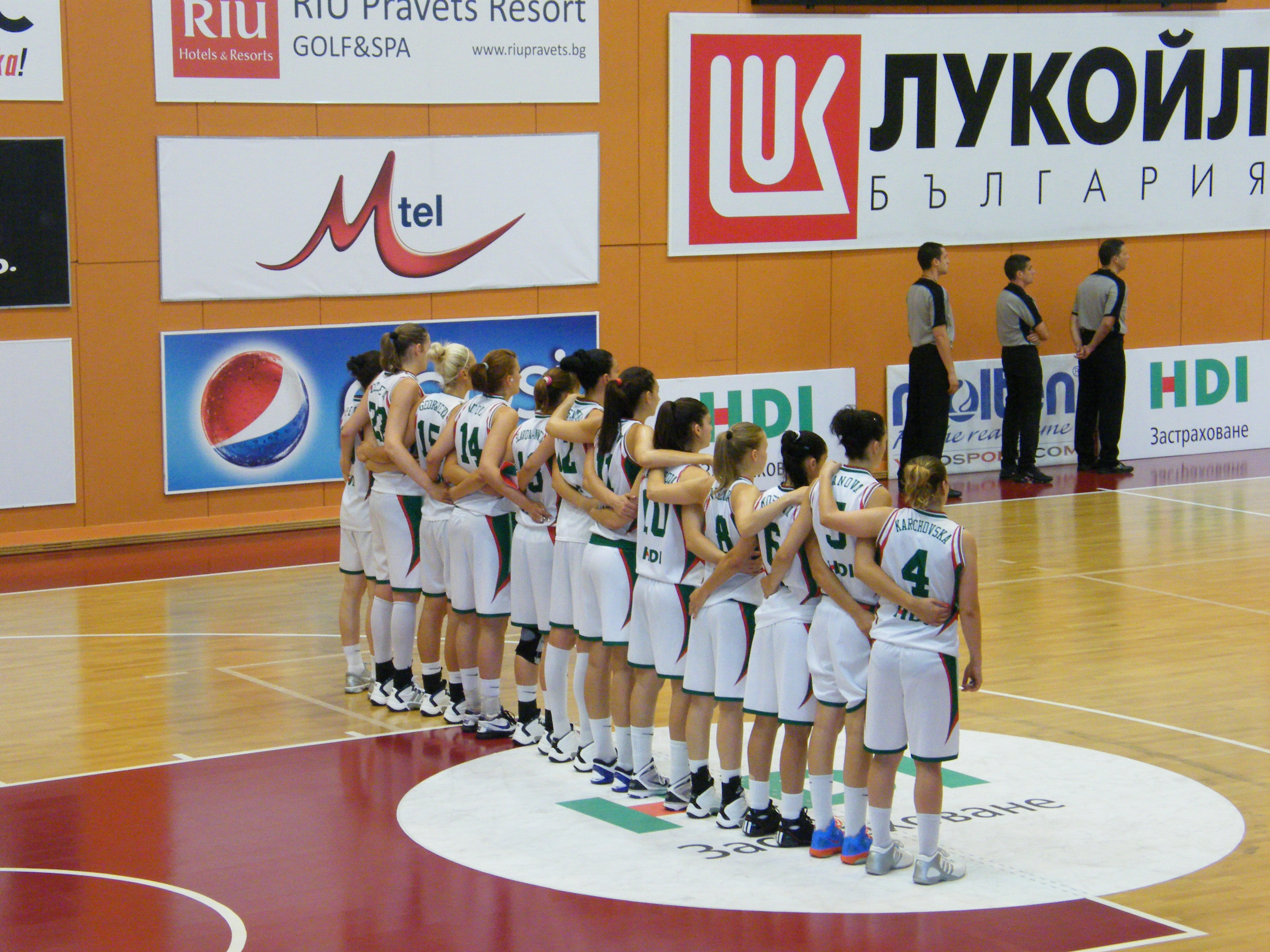
Jaklin Zlatanova with Bulgarian national team during the qualification campaign in Pravets, 2011

Zlatanova has been part of the Bulgarian national team since 2003 when she competed for the first time with the Cadettes team on the European Championship Challenge Round. Since then she has played more than 100 games with the youth and women's representative team of the country.

However, Bulgaria has not played in the European Championship for more than 20 years despite the efforts of three generations of female basketball players. Due to the three major injuries in the period, 2012-2014 Zlatanova missed one Round of the European Qualifications in 2014. The last time she took part of the official's games, during the EuroBasket campaign in 2013, she was the top scorer for her team with an average of 14.1 Points, 6.1 Rebounds and 1.5 Assist per game.

=== Bulgarian National team statistics ===
Team, Competition, year	Points per game	Rebounds per game	Assists per game
(Bulgaria) European Championship for Cadettes - Challenge Round 2003	12.5	10.0	1.6
(Bulgaria) European Championship for U18 Women - Qualifying Round 2004	2.8	2.5	0.5
(Bulgaria) European Championship for U18 Women - Challenge Round 2004	8.0	4.3	0.6
(Bulgaria) European Championship for U18 Women - Final Round 2004	5.0	6.3	1.1
(Bulgaria) European Championship for U16 Women - Division A 2004	12.1	7.4	0.9
(Bulgaria) European Championship for U20 Women - Division B 2005	11.4	5.0	0.2
(Bulgaria) European Championship for U18 Women - Division A 2005	16.3	8.4	3.4
(Bulgaria) European Championship for U20 Women - Division A 2006	11.7	3.3	1.8
(Bulgaria) European Championship for U18 Women - Division A 2006	14.8	9.4	2.1
(Bulgaria) European Championship for U20 Women - Division A 2007	20.6	8.6	2.6
(Bulgaria) European Championship for U20 Women - Division A 2008	11.3	7.0	1.2
(Bulgaria) EuroBasket Women - Division A 2009	0.0	1.5	0.0
(Bulgaria) EuroBasket Women - Division A 2011	14.0	5.8	1.5
(Bulgaria) Eurobasket Women - Qualifiers 2013	14.1	6.1	1.9
(Bulgaria) EuroBasket Women - Qualifiers 2017	5.5	4.0	0.5
(Bulgaria) EuroBasket Women - Qualifiers 2020			

== Club career: 2005–2021 ==
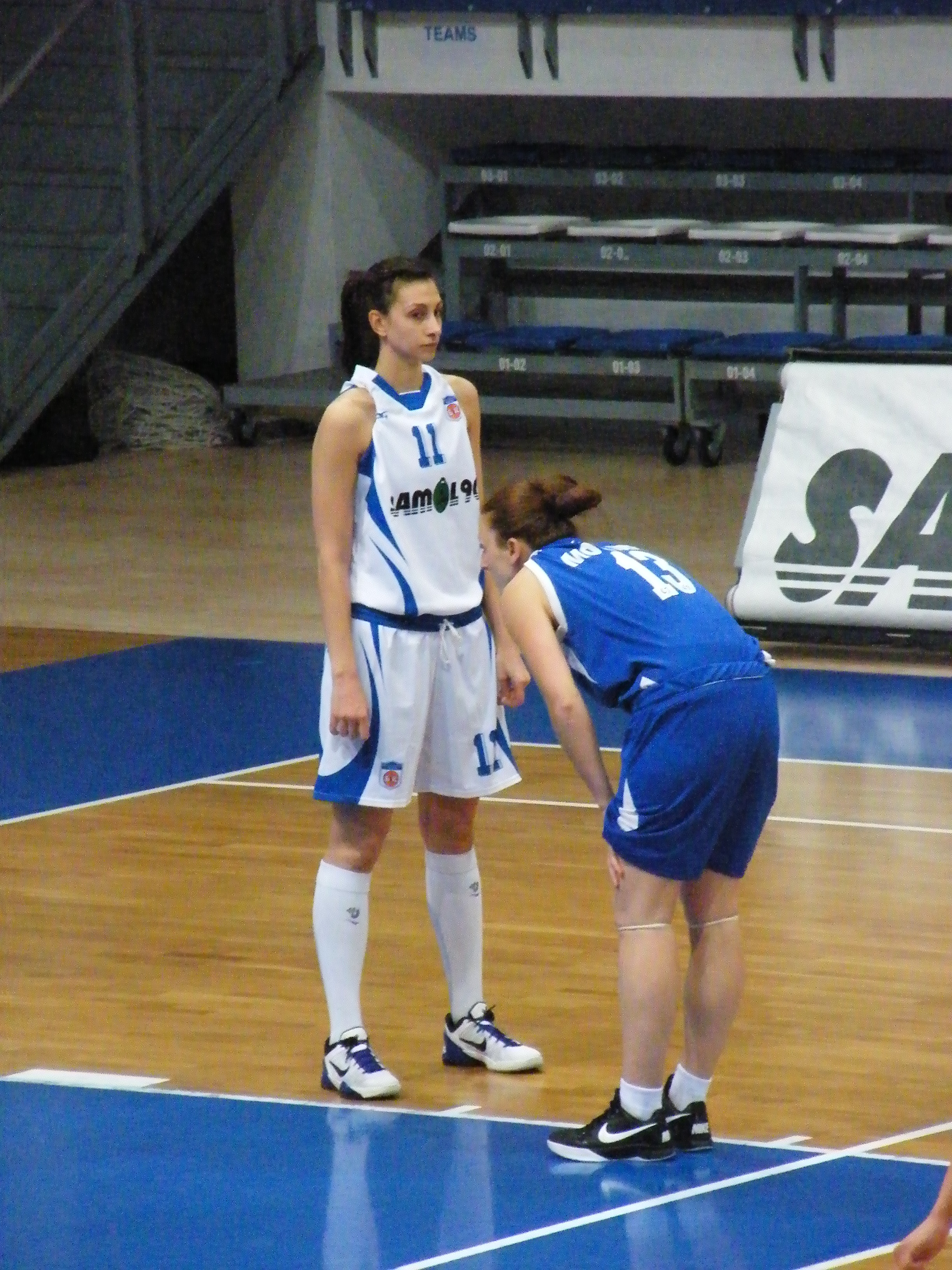
During the playoffs in season 2011–2012 in Bulgarian national league Zlatanova played two games with the team of Rilski Sportist where for 38 minutes she scored 37 points and 11 rebounds.

Most of her career Zlatanova has spent abroad, mainly in French and Spanish teams. In 2005 she was part of the Tarbes GB in southwest France where she made her debut on the European scene in the Euroleague competition. Having spent four years in the club (2005-2008), Zlatanova decided to move to Spain in Extrugasa's team at the beginning of 2009 season. She played in the EuroCup competition with an average of 14.3 points, 2.8 rebounds and 0.8 assists per game.

In the following season 2010–2011, she joined the Grand Canaria's team. Following up on the former success, the squad took part in the Eurocup competition with Zlatanova being one of the most important players with an average of 11.2 points, 7.4 rebounds and 1.4 assists per game. With the relatively young club Mann Filter Zaragoza, she began her seventh consecutive season in the European competitions, eventually ending up with an average of 10.2 points, six rebounds and 1.4 assists per game.

Moreover, the most significant step in athlete's career was when she signed Rival Ecopolis in 2013. Unfortunately, during the training period, before the official start of the season, the athlete underwent rapture of the Achilles tendon which was the first out of three serious injuries. After four months of recovering she was able to play just a couple of games before the second intervention on the same leg. Having missed the entire season, Jaklin Zlatanova decided to go back to Bulgaria, where she signed contract with Dunav 8806 Ruse in 2013. The first couple of rehabilitation months went very well, and she was even able to compete in the Eurocup again, becoming the most important player on the team with an average of 12.4 points, 6.2 rebounds and 1.4 assists per game. The end of the remaining season was over when she got injured her left knee and underwent an operation in January 2014.

Competition	Team	Points per game	Rebounds per game	Assists per game
FIBA EuroLeague Women 2005 - 2006	(France) Tarbes GB	1.7	1.0	0.4
FIBA EuroCup Women 2006 - 2007	(France) Tarbes GB	3.4	2.9	0.6
FIBA EuroCup Women 2007 - 2008	(France) Tarbes GB	8.0	2.0	0.9
FIBA EuroCup Women 2008 - 2009	(France) Tarbes GB	4.4	2.6	0.8
FIBA EuroCup Women 2009 - 2010	(Spain) Extrugasa	14.3	2.8	0.8
FIBA EuroCup Women 2010 - 2011	(Spain) Gran Canaria	11.2	7.4	1.4
FIBA EuroCup Women 2011 - 2012	(Spain) Mann Filter	10.2	6.0	2.2
FIBA EuroCup Women 2014 - 2015	(Bulgaria) Dunav 8806 Ruse	12.4	6.2	1.4
WABA League 2019 - 2020	(Bulgaria) WBC Beroe	8.8	9	2.5

=== Season 2013–2014 ===
After ten years abroad Zlatanova returned home for the season 2013–2014 with the team of Dunav 8806 Ruse. The club confirmed their participation in the EuroCup, and the presence in the composition of Zlatanova gave them great hopes for good performance. Unfortunately, the existence of strong clubs from Turkey and Russia left the inexperienced team of Dunav 8806 at the bottom of the points table, and they had to focus their efforts only on the local league. Having recovered from the second Achilles tendon operation, Zlatanova was very close to becoming one of the most important players in the squad but unlucky she injured her left knee in one of the last games before the Christmas break. The medical examinations showed rupture of the ties of her knee, and she underwent a new intervention in early 2014. For the entire season, 2013-2014 Jaklin Zlatanova participated in 11 games with an average of 12.4 points, 5.2 rebounds and 1.5 assists per game. Meanwhile, Dunav 8806 Ruse continued competing in the league, being in position for the gold medal. Without Zlatanova they managed to defeat the strong team of Levski Sofia and to become the champions for the fourth time in their history.

	Games played	Games started	Minutes per game	2-point field goal %	3-point field goal %	Rebounds per game	Assist per game	Points per game
AVG	11	5	22.5	52.1 %	18.5%	5.2	1.5	12.4
Total	11	5	22.5	52.1%	18.5%	57	17	136

=== Season 2014–2015 ===
After a long recovery, which lasted nearly nine months, the athlete was ready for her second season with the Dunav 8806. She played 31 games of the regular season and playoffs in 27 of which she has started. For the entire season, Zlatanova scored an average of 11.3 points, 7.4 rebounds, and 2.5 assists. Also, the lineup took part in the Bulgarian Cup competition where was eliminated in the semifinals, but Zlatanova reinforced its strong position by becoming one of the top three scorers of the tournament. However, this was not enough for her team, and competitors from Ruse won only the bronze medal. Just a month later the basketball players had the opportunity to revenge for the loss, and in the final playoff series against Neftohimik Bourgas, they eventually won the title after 3–0 in the series.

	Games played	Games started	Minutes per game	2-point field goal %	3-point field goal %	Rebounds per game	Assist per game	Points per game
AVG	31	27	26.7	52.9 %	8.3%	7.4	2.5	11.3
Total	31	31	827.7	52.9%	8.3%	229	77.5	350.3

=== Season 2015–2016 ===
	Games played	Games started	Minutes per game	2-point field goal %	3-point field goal %	Rebounds per game	Assist per game	Points per game
AVG	28	26	32.43	51 %	22.2 %	8.6	2.4	12.1
Total	28	26	916.10	51 %	22%	241	67	340

=== Season 2017–2018 ===
Having missed out the entire 2016–2017 season due to the pregnancy, Zlatanova joined Gaby Ocete and Pao Ferrari and started her second season with the jersey of Mann Filer Stadium Casablanca.

=== Season 2019–2020 ===
In 2019 Jaklin signed with WBC Beroe, which is competing in the National Women's Basketball leagues in Bulgaria. Below is her statistics for the current season.

	Games played	Games started	Minutes per game	2-point field goal %	3-point field goal %	Rebounds per game	Assist per game	Points per game
AVG	25	23	21.1	54.6%	23.1%	8.0	2.2	9.2
Total	25	23	528	54.6%	23.1%	199	55	231

WBC Beroe also participates in the WABA League, which is the regional basketball league, featuring female teams from Serbia, Montenegro, Bosnia and Herzegovina, Bulgaria, Slovenia, and Croatia. For the season 2019–2020, Zlatanova has played 12 games with 8.8 points per game and nine rebounds. See the statistics below.

	Games played	Points per game	Rebounds per game	Assist per game	Efficiency	+/-
AVG	12	8.8	9.0	2.5	15.8	7.8
Ranking #	-	41	3	28	13	25

=== Season 2020–2021 ===
In the current 2020–2021 season, Zlatanova renewed her contract with the team of WBC Beroe. However, due to the COVID-19 pandemic, the women's basketball league competitions in Bulgaria have been suspended.

== Social media ==
- Personal page at Facebook.com
