= Tina Trebec =

Slovenian basketball player

No. 13 – Sassari Sardegna
- Position: Power forward
- League: Italian Women's Basketball Championship

Personal information
- Born: March 10, 1990 (age 36) Postojna, Slovenia
- Listed height: 6 ft 2 in (1.88 m)

Tina Trebec (born March 10, 1990) is a Slovenian basketball player for Sassari Sardegna and the Slovenian national team.

She participated at the EuroBasket Women 2017, 2019, 2021.
