= Aleksandra Račić =

Serbian basketball player

No. 10 – Donau-Ries
- Position: Guard
- League: Bundesliga

Personal information
- Born: September 19, 1990 (age 36) Kraljevo, SFR Yugoslavia
- Listed height: 1.81 m (5 ft 11 in)

Career information
- WNBA draft: 2012: undrafted
- Playing career: 2007–present

Career history
- Kraljevo
- Student Niš
- –2012: Radnički Kragujevac
- 2012–2014: Šumadija Kragujevac
- 2014–2015: CS Sfaxien
- 2015: Vojvodina
- 2016–present: Donau-Ries

Aleksandra Račić (Serbian: Александра Рачић; born September 19, 1990) is a Serbian female basketball player.

== Professional career ==
During the 2015–16 season of the First Women's Basketball League of Serbia, Račić averaged 25.3 points, 6.8 rebounds and 3.5 assists per game. She then signed with Donau-Ries in Germany.
