= Chelsey Lee =

American basketball player

No. 52 – Beroe
- Title: Center
- League: First League of Bulgaria; Adriatic League

Personal information
- Born: December 10, 1989 (age 36) Miami, United States
- Listed height: 1.93 m (6 ft 4 in)

Career information
- High school: Parkway Academy
- College: Rutgers (2008–2013)
- WNBA draft: 2013: undrafted
- Playing career: 2013–present
- Position: Center

Career history
- 2013–2014: CREFF Madrid
- 2014–2015: Phoenix Galați
- 2015–2016: Bucheon KEB Hana Bank
- 2016–2017: Haskovo 2012
- 2017–2018: Broni
- 2018–2019: ICIM Arad
- 2019–present: Beroe

Career highlights
- McDonald's All-American (2008)

Chelsey Lee (born 10 December 1989 in Miami, United States) is an American basketball player. She currently played for Beroe in First League of Bulgaria and Adriatic League.

She also played for CREFF Madrid, Phoenix Galați, Bucheon KEB Hana Bank, Haskovo 2012, Broni and ICIM Arad.

== Rutgers statistics ==
Legend
GP	Games played	GS	Games started	MPG	Minutes per game
FG%	Field goal percentage	3P%	3-point field goal percentage	FT%	Free throw percentage
RPG	Rebounds per game	APG	Assists per game	SPG	Steals per game
BPG	Blocks per game	PPG	Points per game	**Bold**	Career high

Year	Team	GP	Points	FG%	3P%	FT%	RPG	APG	SPG	BPG	PPG
2008–09	Rutgers	27	26	45.8%	–	36.4%	1.3	0.1	0.2	0.3	1.0
2009–10	Rutgers	**33**	239	46.3%	–	53.7%	7.2	0.7	0.9	1.1	7.2
2010–11	Rutgers	**33**	**281**	50.9%	–	**67.0%**	**7.5**	0.6	**1.0**	**1.4**	**8.5**
2011–12	Rutgers	Redshirt									
2012–13	Rutgers	24	156	**51.7%**	–	59.6%	5.0	**0.7**	0.7	0.8	6.5
Career		117	702	49.2%	–	59.1%	5.5	0.5	0.7	0.9	6.0
