= 2017–18 Atlantic Coast Conference women's basketball season =

- League: NCAA Division I
- Sport: Basketball
- Teams: 15
- TV partner(s): ACC Network, ESPN, Regional Sports Networks

WNBA Draft
- Top draft pick: Lexie Brown, Duke
- Picked by: Connecticut Sun

2017–18 NCAA Division I women's basketball season
- Regular Season Champions: Louisville
- Runners-up: Notre Dame
- Season MVP: Asia Durr – Louisville
- Top scorer: Arike Ogunbowale – Notre Dame

ACC Tournament
- Champions: Louisville
- Finals MVP: Myisha Hines-Allen

Atlantic Coast Conference women's basketball seasons
- ← 2016–17 2018–19 →

2017–18 ACC women's basketball standings
	Conf.				Overall
Team	W		L	PCT	W		L	PCT
No. 3 Louisville *†	15	–	1	.938	36	–	3	.923
No. 5 Notre Dame	15	–	1	.938	35	–	3	.921
No. 11 Florida State	12	–	4	.750	26	–	7	.788
No. 21 NC State	11	–	5	.688	26	–	9	.743
No. 20 Duke	11	–	5	.688	24	–	9	.727
Syracuse	10	–	6	.625	22	–	9	.710
Miami (FL)	10	–	6	.625	21	–	11	.656
Virginia	10	–	6	.625	19	–	14	.576
Virginia Tech	6	–	10	.375	23	–	14	.622
Georgia Tech	6	–	10	.375	20	–	14	.588
Wake Forest	5	–	11	.313	14	–	17	.452
North Carolina	4	–	12	.250	15	–	16	.484
Pittsburgh	2	–	14	.125	10	–	20	.333
Boston College	2	–	14	.125	7	–	23	.233
Clemson	1	–	15	.063	11	–	19	.367
† 2018 ACC tournament winner * Tournament #1 seed As of 31 March 2018; Rankings from AP poll

The 2017–18 Atlantic Coast Conference women's basketball season began with practices in October 2017, followed by the start of the 2017–18 NCAA Division I women's basketball season in November. Conference play started in late December 2017 and will conclude in March with the 2018 ACC women's basketball tournament at the Greensboro Coliseum in Greensboro, NC. The regular season and tournament champions were the Louisville Cardinals.

== Head coaches ==
=== Coaching changes ===
There were no coaching changes prior to the 2017–18 season. However, after the season ended, Erik Johnson resigned as the head coach of Boston College. Also after the season concluded it was announced that Audra Smith would not be returning as coach of Clemson.

=== Coaches ===
Team	Head coach	Previous job	Years at school	Record at school	ACC record	ACC titles	NCAA Tournaments	NCAA Final Fours	NCAA Championships
Boston College	Erik Johnson	Denver	6	61–92	17–63	0	0	0	0
Clemson	Audra Smith	UAB	5	41–80	8–55	0	0	0	0
Duke	Joanne P. McCallie	Michigan State	11	273–71	121–33	4	9	0	0
Florida State	Sue Semrau	Wisconsin (Assistant)	21	401–233	174–134	2	13	0	0
Georgia Tech	MaChelle Joseph	Georgia Tech (Assistant)	15	274–177	100–112	0	7	0	0
Louisville	Jeff Walz	Maryland (Assistant)	11	263–93	113–47	0	3	2	0
Miami	Katie Meier	Charlotte	13	231–152	89–93	1	6	0	0
NC State	Wes Moore	Chattanooga	5	86–43	40–24	0	2	0	0
North Carolina	Sylvia Hatchell	Francis Marion	32	718–296	285–187	7	22	3	1
Notre Dame	Muffet McGraw	Lehigh	31	763–226	389–84	4	4	7	1
Pittsburgh	Suzie McConnell-Serio	Duquesne	5	57–57	20–44	0	1	0	0
Syracuse	Quentin Hillsman	Syracuse (Assistant)	11	95–39	45–29	0	4	1	0
Virginia	Joanne Boyle	California	7	110–85	43–55	0	5	0	0
Virginia Tech	Kenny Brooks	James Madison	2	20–14	4–12	0	0	0	0
Wake Forest	Jennifer Hoover	High Point	6	74–87	24–58	0	0	0	0

Notes:

- Year at school includes 2017–18 season.
- Overall and ACC records are from time at current school and are through the end the 2016–17 season.
- NCAA Tournament appearances are from time at current school only.
- NCAA Final Fours and Championship include time at other schools

== Preseason ==
=== Preseason watch lists ===
Below is a table of notable preseason watch lists.

Lieberman	Drysdale	Miller	McClain	Leslie
Lexie Brown – Duke; Chanette Hicks – Virginia Tech	Asia Durr – Louisville; Rebecca Greenwell – Duke; Arike Ogunbowale – Notre Dame	Shakayla Thomas – Florida State	Myisha Hines-Allen – Louisville; Erykah Davenport – Miami; Leaonna Odom – Duke	Akela Maize – NC State; Erin Mathias – Florida State; Chatrice White – Florida State

=== ACC Preseason Media Day ===
Prior to the start of the season, the ACC hosted a media day at the Westin Hotel in Charlotte, North Carolina. At the media day, the head coaches voted on the finishing order of the teams, an All-ACC team, a Preseason Player of the Year, and Newcomers to watch. The media day was hosted on October 19, 2017. A selected group of student athletes also took questions from the media on this day.

==== ACC preseason polls ====
At ACC Media Day, the ACC Head Coaches voted on a final finishing order for all ACC teams, as well as a Blue Ribbon Panel. The results are shown below.

===== Head Coaches Poll =====
First place votes shown in parentheses.

1. Notre Dame (8) – 212
2. Louisville (1) – 205
3. Duke (3) – 200
4. Florida State (3) – 188
5. Virginia – 148
6. Georgia Tech – 141
7. Syracuse – 122
8. Miami – 113
9. North Carolina – 103
10. NC State – 97
11. Wake Forest – 90
12. Virginia Tech – 82
13. Clemson – 43
14. Boston College – 37
15. Pittsburgh – 19

===== Blue Ribbon Panel =====
First place votes shown in parentheses.

1. Notre Dame (35) – 858
2. Louisville (5) – 809
3. Duke (10) – 799
4. Florida State (10) – 752
5. Miami – 515
6. Virginia – 505
7. Syracuse – 497
8. NC State – 463
9. Georgia Tech – 456
10. North Carolina – 434
11. Virginia Tech – 334
12. Wake Forest – 316
13. Pittsburgh – 193
14. Clemson – 164
15. Boston College – 86

==== Preseason All-ACC Teams ====
2017 ACC Women's Basketball Preseason All-ACC Teams
Head coaches	Blue Ribbon Panel
Lexie Brown, R-Sr., G, Duke; Rebecca Greenwell, R-Sr., G, Duke; Shakayla Thomas, Sr., F, Florida State; Francesca Pan, So., G, Georgia Tech; Asia Durr, Jr., G, Louisville; Myisha Hines-Allen, Sr., F, Louisville; Paris Kea, R-Jr., G, North Carolina; Arike Ogunbowale, Jr., G, Notre Dame; Marina Mabrey, Jr., G, Notre Dame; Elisa Penna, So., G, Wake Forest	Lexie Brown, R-Sr., G, Duke; Rebecca Greenwell, R-Sr., G, Duke; Shakayla Thomas, Sr., F, Florida State; Asia Durr, Jr., G, Louisville; Myisha Hines-Allen, Sr., F, Louisville; Stephanie Watts, Jr., G, North Carolina; Paris Kea, R-Jr., G, North Carolina; Arike Ogunbowale, Jr., G, Notre Dame; Marina Mabrey, Jr., G, Notre Dame; Chanette Hicks, Jr., G, Virginia Tech

==== Preseason ACC Player of the Year ====
2017 ACC Women's Basketball Preseason Player of the Year
Head coaches	Blue Ribbon Panel
Asia Durr, Jr., G, Louisville	Lexie Brown, R-Sr., G, Duke

==== Newcomer Watchlist ====
2017 ACC Women's Basketball Newcomer Watchlists
Head coaches	Blue Ribbon Panel
Mikayla Boykin, Fr., G, Duke; Lorela Cubaj, Fr., F, Georgia Tech; Dana Evans, Fr., G, Louisville; Janelle Bailey, Fr., C, North Carolina; Lili Thompson, GS, G, Notre Dame	Mikayla Boykin, Fr., G, Duke; Bego Faz Davalos, R-Sr., C, Duke; Dana Evans, Fr., G, Louisville; Janelle Bailey, Fr., C, North Carolina; Lili Thompson, GS, G, Notre Dame

== Regular season ==
=== Rankings ===
Legend
Increase in ranking
Decrease in ranking
Not ranked previous week
First Place votes shown in ()

		Pre	Wk 2	Wk 3	Wk 4	Wk 5	Wk 6	Wk 7	Wk 8	Wk 9	Wk 10	Wk 11	Wk 12	Wk 13	Wk 14	Wk 15	Wk 16	Wk 17	Wk 18	Wk 19	Final
Boston College	AP																				
Boston College	C																				
Clemson	AP																				
Clemson	C																				
Duke	AP	12	11	16	14	14	14	14	14	17	16	15	18	19	19	17	20	18	20	20	
Duke	C	12	12	17	16	14	14	15	15	18	18	15	18	19	19	16	16	15	18	18	12
Florida State	AP	18	17	13	13	13	12	13	13	11	13	12	8	10	12	12	9	11	11	11	
Florida State	C	14	14	11	11	10	10	13	13	12	12	11	8	11	12	12	9	11	11	11	13
Georgia Tech	AP	RV	RV	RV						RV											
Georgia Tech	C	RV	RV	RV		RV	RV	RV	RV	RV	RV										
Louisville	AP	9	5	4	4	4	4	3	3	3	3	2	4	4	4	4	4	4	3	3	
Louisville	C	10	10	7	5	5	4	4	4	4	4	2	4	4	4	5	5	5	3	3	4
Miami	AP	RV	RV							RV						RV	RV	RV	RV		
Miami	C	24	24	RV	RV		RV	RV		RV	RV		RV	RV	RV	RV	RV	RV	RV	RV	RV
North Carolina	AP																				
North Carolina	C																				
NC State	AP											RV	RV	RV	23	25	21	23	21	21	
NC State	C											RV	RV	RV	23	25	22	22	22	22	16
Notre Dame	AP	6	6	6	3	3	2	2	2	2	2	5	5	5	5	5	5	5	5	5	
Notre Dame	C	5	5	6	2	2	2	2	2	2	2	5	5	5	5	4	4	4	6	6	1
Pittsburgh	AP																				
Pittsburgh	C																				
Syracuse	AP	RV	RV		RV	RV	RV	RV	RV	RV	RV	RV		RV			RV	RV			
Syracuse	C	RV	RV	RV	25	24	23	22	23	RV	RV	RV	RV	RV	RV	RV	24	23	RV	RV	RV
Virginia	AP																			RV	
Virginia	C																RV	RV	RV	RV	RV
Virginia Tech	AP									RV											
Virginia Tech	C	RV	RV	RV		RV	RV	RV	RV		RV								RV	RV	RV
Wake Forest	AP																				
Wake Forest	C																				

Note: The Coaches Poll releases a final poll after the NCAA tournament, but the AP Poll does not release a poll at this time.

=== Conference matrix ===
This table summarizes the head-to-head results between teams in conference play. Each team will play 16 conference games, and at least 1 against each opponent.

	Boston College	Clemson	Duke	Florida State	Georgia Tech	Louisville	Miami	North Carolina	NC State	Notre Dame	Pittsburgh	Syracuse	Virginia	Virginia Tech	Wake Forest
vs. Boston College	–	1–0	1–0	1–0	1–0	1–0	1–0	0–1	1–0	2–0	0–1	2–0	1–0	1–0	1–0
vs. Clemson	0–1	–	1–0	2–0	2–0	1–0	1–0	1–0	1–0	1–0	1–0	1–0	1–0	1–0	1–0
vs. Duke	0–1	0–1	–	0–1	0–1	1–0	1–0	1–1	0–1	1–0	0–1	1–0	0–1	0–1	0–2
vs. Florida State	0–1	0–2	1–0	–	0–1	0–1	0–2	0–1	1–0	1–0	0–1	1–0	0–1	0–1	0–1
vs. Georgia Tech	0–1	0–2	1–0	1–0	–	1–0	0–1	0–1	1–0	2–0	1–0	1–0	1–0	1–0	0–1
vs. Louisville	0–1	0–1	0–1	1–0	0–1	–	0–1	0–1	0–1	0–1	0–2	0–1	0–2	0–1	0–1
vs. Miami	0–1	0–1	0–1	2–0	1–0	1–0	–	0–1	0–1	1–0	0–1	0–1	0–1	0–2	1–0
vs. North Carolina	1–0	0–1	1–1	1–0	1–0	1–0	1–0	–	2–0	1–0	0–1	1–0	1–0	1–0	0–1
vs. NC State	0–1	0–1	1–0	0–1	0–1	1–0	1–0	0–2	–	1–0	0–1	0–1	1–0	0–1	0–2
vs. Notre Dame	0–2	0–1	0–1	0–1	0–2	1–0	0–1	0–1	0–1	–	0–1	0–1	0–1	0–1	0–1
vs. Pittsburgh	1–0	0–1	1–0	1–0	0–1	2–0	1–0	1–0	1–0	1–0	–	2–0	1–0	1–0	1–0
vs. Syracuse	0–2	0–1	0–1	0–1	0–1	1–0	1–0	0–1	1–0	1–0	0–2	–	1–0	1–0	0–1
vs. Virginia	0–1	0–1	1–0	1–0	0–1	2–0	1–0	0–1	0–1	1–0	0–1	0–1	–	0–2	0–1
vs. Virginia Tech	0–1	0–1	1–0	1–0	0–1	1–0	2–0	0–1	1–0	1–0	0–1	0–1	2–0	–	1–0
vs. Wake Forest	0–1	0–1	2–0	1–0	1–0	1–0	0–1	1–0	2–0	1–0	0–1	1–0	1–0	0–1	–
Total	2–14	1–15	11–5	12–4	6–10	15–1	10–6	4–12	11–5	15–1	2–14	10–6	10–6	6–10	5–11

=== Player of the week ===
Throughout the conference regular season, the Atlantic Coast Conference offices named a Player(s) of the week and a Rookie(s) of the week.

Week	Player of the week	Rookie of the week	Reference
November 13, 2017	Asia Durr, Louisville	Mykea Grey, Miami	
November 20, 2017	Myisha Hines-Allen, Louisville	Janelle Bailey, North Carolina	
November 27, 2017	Jackie Young, Notre Dame	Mykea Grey (2), Miami	
November 27, 2017	Tiana Mangakahia, Syracuse	Mykea Grey (2), Miami	
December 4, 2017	Shakayla Thomas, Florida State	Janelle Bailey (2), North Carolina	
December 11, 2017	Lexie Brown, Duke	Digna Strautmane, Syracuse	
December 18, 2017	Jessica Shepard, Notre Dame	Janelle Bailey (3), North Carolina	
December 26, 2017	Lexie Brown (2), Duke	Milan Bolden-Morris, Boston College	
January 2, 2018	Asia Durr (2), Louisville	Janelle Bailey (4), North Carolina	
January 2, 2018	Imani Wright, Florida State	Janelle Bailey (4), North Carolina	
January 8, 2018	Tiana Mangakahia (2), Syracuse	Milan Bolden-Morris (2), Boston College	
January 15, 2018	Asia Durr (3), Louisville	Janelle Bailey (5), North Carolina	
January 22, 2018	Arike Ogunbowale, Notre Dame	Amaya Finklea-Guity, Syracuse	
January 29, 2018	Jessica Shepard (2), Notre Dame	Digna Strautmane (2), Syracuse	
February 5, 2018	Asia Durr (4), Louisville	Digna Strautmane (3), Syracuse	
February 12, 2018	Taylor Emery, Virginia Tech	Janelle Bailey (6), North Carolina	
February 19, 2018	Elisa Penna, Wake Forest	Kierra Fletcher, Georgia Tech	
February 26, 2018	Lexie Brown (3), Duke	Janelle Bailey (7), North Carolina	

== Postseason ==
=== ACC tournament ===
First round Wednesday, February 28
12	North Carolina	69
13	Boston College	64
10	Georgia Tech	61
15	Clemson	52
11	Wake Forest	72
14	Pittsburgh	38

Second round Thursday, March 1
5	NC State	77
12	North Carolina	64
8	Syracuse	70
9	Virginia Tech	85
7	Virginia	60
10	Georgia Tech	58
6	Miami	68
11	Wake Forest	60

Quarterfinals; Friday, March 2
4	Duke	45
5	NC State	51
1	Louisville	73
9	Virginia Tech	70
2	Notre Dame	83
7	Virginia	47
3	Florida State	73
6	Miami	69

Semifinals; Saturday, March 3
5	NC State	59
1	Louisville	64
2	Notre Dame	90
3	Florida State	80

Championship; Sunday, March 4
1	Louisville	74
2	Notre Dame	72

=== NCAA tournament ===
Seed	Region	School	1st Round	2nd Round	Sweet 16	Elite Eight	Final Four	Championship
1	Lexington	Louisville	W 74–42 vs. #16 Boise State – (Louisville)	W 90–72 vs. #8 Marquette – (Louisville)	W 86–59 vs. #4 Stanford – (Lexington)	W 76–43 vs. #6 Oregon State – ([Lexington)	L 63–73 (OT) vs. #1 Mississippi State – (Columbus)	
1	Spokane	Notre Dame	W 99–81 vs. #16 Cal State Northridge – (South Bend)	W 98–72 vs. #9 Villanova – (South Bend)	W 90–84 vs. #4 Texas A&M – (Spokane)	W 84–74 vs. #2 Oregon – (Spokane)	W 91–89 (OT) vs. #1 Connecticut – (Columbus)	W 61–58 vs. #1 Mississippi State – (Columbus)
3	Albany	Florida State	W 91–49 vs. #14 Little Rock – (Tallahassee)	L 65–86 vs. #11 Buffalo – (Tallahassee)				
4	Kansas City	NC State	W 62–35 vs. #13 Elon – (Raleigh)	W 74–60 vs. #5 Maryland – (Raleigh)	L 57–71 vs. #1 Mississippi State – (Kansas City)			
5	Albany	Duke	W 72–58 vs. #12 Belmont – (Athens)	W 66–40 vs. #4 Georgia – (Athens)	L 59–72 vs. #1 Connecticut – (Albany)			
8	Albany	Miami	L 72–86 vs. #9 Quinnipiac – (Storrs)					
8	Kansas City	Syracuse	L 57–84 vs. #9 Oklahoma State – (Starkville)					
10	Albany	Virginia	W 68–62 vs. #7 Cal – (Columbia)	L 56–66 vs. #2 South Carolina – (Columbia)				
		W–L (%):	6–2 (.750)	4–2 (.667)	2–2 (.500)	2–0 (1.000)	1–1 (.500)	1–0 (1.000) Total: 16–7 (.696)

=== National Invitation tournament ===
School	1st Round	2nd Round	3rd Round	Quarterfinals	Semifinals	Championship
Georgia Tech	W 85–32 vs. Bethune–Cookman – (Atlanta)	W 91–47 vs. UAB – (Atlanta)	L 59–61 vs. Alabama – (Tuscaloosa)			
Virginia Tech	W 56–55 vs. Navy – (Blacksburg)	W 78–69 vs. George Mason – (Blacksburg)	W 81–50 vs. Fordham – (Blacksburg)	W 74–67 vs. Alabama – (Blacksburg)	W 64–61 vs. West Virginia – (Morgantown)	L 57–65 vs. Indiana – (Bloomington)
W–L (%):	2–0 (1.000)	2–0 (1.000)	1–1 (.500)	1–0 (1.000)	1–0 (1.000)	0–1 (.000) Total: 7–2 (.778)

== Honors and awards ==
=== ACC Awards ===
2017 ACC Women's Basketball Individual Awards
Award	Recipient(s)
Player of the Year	Asia Durr – Louisville
Coach of the Year	Jeff Walz – Louisville
Defensive Player of the Year	Lexie Brown – Duke
Freshman of the Year	Janelle Bailey – North Carolina
Sixth Player of the Year	Zaire O’Neil – Georgia Tech

2017 ACC Women's Basketball All-Conference Teams
First Team	Second Team	Freshman Team
Lexie Brown, R-Sr., G, Duke; Shakayla Thomas, Sr., F, Florida State; Imani Wright, R-Sr., G, Florida State; Asia Durr, Jr., G, Louisville; Myisha Hines-Allen, Sr., F, Louisville; Paris Kea, R-Jr., G, North Carolina; Chelsea Nelson, Sr., F, NC State; Arike Ogunbowale, Jr., G, Notre Dame; Jessica Shepard, Jr., F, Notre Dame; Tiana Mangakahia, So., G, Syracuse	Rebecca Greenwell, R-Sr., G, Duke; Erykah Davenport, Sr., F/C, Miami; Marina Mabrey, Jr., G, Notre Dame; Taylor Emery, Jr., G, Virginia Tech; Elisa Penna, Jr, F, Wake Forest	Milan Bolden-Morris, Fr., G, Boston College; Jade Williams, Fr., F, Duke; Kierra Fletcher, Fr., G, Georgia Tech; Dana Evans, Fr., G, Louisville; Mykea Gray, Fr., G, Miami; Kelsey Marshall, Fr., G, Miami; Janelle Bailey, Fr., F, North Carolina; Digna Strautmane, Fr., F, Syracuse

== WNBA draft ==
The ACC had 5 players selected in the 2018 WNBA draft.

Player	Team	Round	Pick #	Position	School
Lexie Brown	Connecticut Sun	1	9	G	Duke
Myisha Hines-Allen	Washington Mystics	2	19	F	Louisville
Shakayla Thomas	Los Angeles Sparks	2	23	F	Florida State
Imani Wright	Phoenix Mercury	3	26	G	Florida State
Rebecca Greenwell	Washington Mystics	3	31	G	Duke
