= 2017–18 Notre Dame Fighting Irish women's basketball team =

Intercollegiate basketball season

2017–18 Notre Dame Fighting Irish women's basketball

NCAA tournament national champions ACC regular season co-champions Gulf Coast Showcase champions
- Conference: Atlantic Coast Conference

Ranking
- Coaches: No. 1
- AP: No. 5
- Record: 35–3 (15–1 ACC)
- Head coach: Muffet McGraw (31st season)
- Associate head coach: Carol Owens (18th season)
- Assistant coaches: Niele Ivey (11th season); Beth Cunningham (6th season)
- Home arena: Edmund P. Joyce Center

2017–18 ACC women's basketball standings
	Conf.				Overall
Team	W		L	PCT	W		L	PCT
No. 3 Louisville *†	15	–	1	.938	36	–	3	.923
No. 5 Notre Dame	15	–	1	.938	35	–	3	.921
No. 11 Florida State	12	–	4	.750	26	–	7	.788
No. 21 NC State	11	–	5	.688	26	–	9	.743
No. 20 Duke	11	–	5	.688	24	–	9	.727
Syracuse	10	–	6	.625	22	–	9	.710
Miami (FL)	10	–	6	.625	21	–	11	.656
Virginia	10	–	6	.625	19	–	14	.576
Virginia Tech	6	–	10	.375	23	–	14	.622
Georgia Tech	6	–	10	.375	20	–	14	.588
Wake Forest	5	–	11	.313	14	–	17	.452
North Carolina	4	–	12	.250	15	–	16	.484
Pittsburgh	2	–	14	.125	10	–	20	.333
Boston College	2	–	14	.125	7	–	23	.233
Clemson	1	–	15	.063	11	–	19	.367
† 2018 ACC tournament winner * Tournament #1 seed As of 31 March 2018; Rankings from AP poll

The 2017–18 Notre Dame Fighting Irish women's basketball team represented the University of Notre Dame during the 2017–18 NCAA Division I women's basketball season. The Fighting Irish, led by thirty-first year head coach Muffet McGraw, played their home games at Edmund P. Joyce Center as members of the Atlantic Coast Conference. McGraw was inducted into the Basketball Hall of Fame at the start of the season. The Irish finished the season 35–3, 15–1 in ACC play to earn a share of the regular season championship. They defeated Virginia and Florida State before losing to Louisville in the ACC Women's Tournament championship. They received an at-large bid as the No. 1 seed in the Spokane region. They defeated Cal State Northridge and Villanova to advance to the Sweet Sixteen. There they defeated Texas A&M and Oregon to advance to the Final Four. After upsetting then-unbeaten Connecticut 91–89 in overtime in the Final Four, Notre Dame played Mississippi State in the national championship. The Irish edged the Bulldogs 61–58 by Arike Ogunbowale's three-pointer with 0.1 seconds left on the clock, capturing their second national title in 18 years. The Irish became the first team in NCAA Women's Basketball history to trail by double digits in both the semifinal and National Championship games and come back to win.

Despite the team's record, its appearance in the championship game was seen as surprising because of its severely depleted roster. Two players missed the entire season to torn ACLs, and two others were lost to the same injury in December; this rash of injuries left the Irish with only seven scholarship players. Brianna Turner, an All-American forward in 2016–17, was injured in the 2017 NCAA tournament; senior guard Mychal Johnson was lost in a preseason practice, freshman center Mikayla Vaughn only played 6 games; and starting senior point guard Lili Thompson was lost on New Year's Eve. Before the championship game, McGraw told media, "I didn't think we'd have more ACL tears than losses. I think it's just an amazing accomplishment for this team and the resilience they've shown all year."

== Offseason ==
=== Departures ===
Name	Number	Pos.	Height	Year	Hometown	Notes
Lindsay Allen	15	G	5'8"	Senior	Mitchellville, MD	Graduated
Erin Boley	22	F	6'2"	Freshman	Hodgenville, KY	Transferred to Oregon
Ali Patberg	20	G	5'10"	Sophomore	Columbus, IN	Transferred to Indiana
Diamond Thompson	35	C	6'5"	Senior	Wheaton, IL	Graduated

== Roster ==
2017–18 Notre Dame Fighting Irish women's basketball team
Players
Coaches

Pos.	#	Name	Height	Year	Previous school	Hometown
G	1	Lilli Thompson (injured)	5 ft 7 in (1.7 m)	RS Sr	Timberview; Stanford	Mansfield, TX
G	2	Kaitlin Cole	5 ft 10 in (1.78 m)	So	Sylvania Northview	Toledo, OH
G	3	Marina Mabrey	5 ft 11 in (1.8 m)	Jr	Manasquan	Belmar, NJ
G	5	Jackie Young	6 ft 0 in (1.83 m)	So	Princeton Community	Princeton, IN
F	11	Brianna Turner (injured) (redshirt)	6 ft 3 in (1.91 m)	Sr	Manvel	Pearland, TX
G	14	Mychal Johnson (injured) (redshirt)	5 ft 7 in (1.7 m)	Sr	Huntington St. Joseph	Huntington, WV
G	20	Nicole Benz (W)	5 ft 8 in (1.73 m)	Fr	William S. Hart	Valencia, CA
F	21	Kristina Nelson	6 ft 4 in (1.93 m)	RS Sr	Buford	Buford, GA
F	23	Jessica Shepard	6 ft 4 in (1.93 m)	Jr	Fremont; Nebraska	Fremont, NE
G	24	Arike Ogunbowale	5 ft 8 in (1.73 m)	Jr	Divine Savior Holy Angels	Milwaukee, WI
C	30	Mikayla Vaughn (injured) (redshirt)	6 ft 3 in (1.91 m)	Fr	Paul VI Catholic	Philadelphia, PA
F	32	Danielle Patterson	6 ft 2 in (1.88 m)	Fr	The Mary Louis Academy	Brooklyn, NY
F	33	Kathryn Westbeld	6 ft 2 in (1.88 m)	Sr	Ketting Fairmount	Kettering, OH
F	40	Maureen Butler	6 ft 1 in (1.85 m)	Jr	Dearborn Divine Child	Livonia, MI

Head coach

- Muffet McGraw (Saint Joseph's)

Assistant coach(es)

- Carol Owens (Northern Illinois)
- Beth Cunningham (Notre Dame)
- Niele Ivey (Notre Dame)

Legend

- (C) Team captain
- (S) Suspended
- (I) Ineligible
- (W) Walk-on
- Injured
- Current redshirt

Roster

== Media ==
All Notre Dame games will air on WHPZ Pulse 96.9 FM. Games are streamed online live.

== Rankings ==
Regular season polls
Poll	Pre- Season	Week 2	Week 3	Week 4	Week 5	Week 6	Week 7	Week 8	Week 9	Week 10	Week 11	Week 12	Week 13	Week 14	Week 15	Week 16	Week 17	Week 18	Week 19	Final
AP	6	6	6	3	3	2	2	2	2	2	5	5	5	5	5	5	5	5	5	N/A
Coaches	5	N/A	6	2	2	2	2	2	2	2	5	5	5	5	4	4	4	6	6	1 (32)

Legend
	Increase in ranking
	Decrease in ranking
	Not ranked previous week
(RV)	Received Votes

== Schedule and results ==
Date time, TV	Rank^{#}	Opponent^{#}	Result	Record	Site (attendance) city, state
Exhibition
Nov 01, 2017*; 7:00 pm	No. 6	Indiana (PA)	W 108–40		Edmund P. Joyce Center (7,268); South Bend, IN
Regular season
Nov 11, 2017*; 1:00 pm, ACCN Extra	No. 6	Mount St. Mary's	W 121–65	1–0	Edmund P. Joyce Center (7,418); South Bend, IN
Nov 14, 2017*; 8:00 pm, FCS	No. 6	at Western Kentucky	W 78–65	2–0	E. A. Diddle Arena (5,061); Bowling Green, KY
Nov 19, 2017*; 2:00 pm, P12N	No. 6	at No. 18 Oregon State	W 72–67	3–0	Gill Coliseum (7,570); Corvallis, OR
Nov 24, 2017*; 7:30 pm	No. 6	vs. East Tennessee State; Gulf Coast Showcase quarterfinals	W 77–46	4–0	Germain Arena; Fort Myers, FL
Nov 25, 2017*; 7:30 pm	No. 6	vs. No. 17 South Florida; Gulf Coast Showcase semifinals	W 76–66	5–0	Germain Arena; Fort Myers, FL
Nov 26, 2017*; 7:30 pm	No. 6	vs. No. 3 South Carolina; Gulf Coast Showcase finals	W 92–85	6–0	Germain Arena; Fort Myers, FL
Nov 29, 2017*; 6:00 pm, BTN	No. 3	at No. 22 Michigan; ACC–Big Ten Women's Challenge	W 83–63	7–0	Crisler Center (3,100); Ann Arbor, MI
Dec 03, 2017*; 4:00 pm, ESPN	No. 3	at No. 1 Connecticut; Jimmy V Classic/Rivalry	L 71–80	7–1	XL Center (15,564); Hartford, CT
Dec 06, 2017*; 7:00 pm, ACCN Extra	No. 3	Michigan State	W 90–59	8–1	Edmund P. Joyce Center (9,149); South Bend, IN
Dec 09, 2017*; 1:00 pm, ILDN	No. 3	at Penn	W 66–54	9–1	Palestra (1,647); Philadelphia, PA
Dec 17, 2017*; 1:00 pm, ACCN Extra	No. 2	DePaul	W 91–82	10–1	Edmund P. Joyce Center (8,503); South Bend, IN
Dec 20, 2017*; 3:00 pm, ACCN Extra	No. 2	Marquette	W 91–85 ^{OT}	11–1	Edmund P. Joyce Center (7,456); South Bend, IN
Dec 28, 2017; 7:00 pm, ACCN Extra	No. 2	Syracuse	W 87–72	12–1 (1–0)	Edmund P. Joyce Center (8,288); South Bend, IN
Dec 31, 2017; 1:00 pm, ACCN Extra	No. 2	at Wake Forest	W 96–73	13–1 (2–0)	LVJM Coliseum (731); Winston-Salem, NC
Jan 04, 2018; 7:00 pm, ACCN Extra	No. 2	Miami (FL)	W 83–76	14–1 (3–0)	Edmund P. Joyce Center (7,828); South Bend, IN
Jan 07, 2018; 2:00 pm, ACCN Extra	No. 2	at Georgia Tech	W 77–54	15–1 (4–0)	McCamish Pavilion (1,601); Atlanta, GA
Jan 11, 2018; 7:00 pm, ESPN	No. 2	at No. 3 Louisville	L 67–100	15–2 (4–1)	KFC Yum! Center (12,614); Louisville, KY
Jan 14, 2018; 1:00 pm, ACCN Extra	No. 2	Boston College	W 89–60	16–2 (5–1)	Edmund P. Joyce Center (8,208); South Bend, IN
Jan 18, 2018*; 7:00 pm, ESPN	No. 5	No. 6 Tennessee	W 84–70	17–2	Edmund P. Joyce Center (8,733); South Bend, IN
Jan 21, 2018; 1:00 pm, ACCN Extra	No. 5	Clemson	W 90–37	18–2 (6–1)	Edmund P. Joyce Center (8,479); South Bend, IN
Jan 25, 2018; 7:00 pm, ACCN Extra	No. 5	at Pittsburgh	W 87–53	19–2 (7–1)	Petersen Events Center (760); Pittsburgh, PA
Jan 28, 2018; 4:00 pm, ESPN2	No. 5	at No. 8 Florida State	W 100–69	20–2 (8–1)	Donald L. Tucker Civic Center (9,498); Tallahassee, FL
Feb 01, 2018; 7:00 pm, ACCN Extra	No. 5	North Carolina	W 94–62	21–2 (9–1)	Edmund P. Joyce Center (7,617); South Bend, IN
Feb 04, 2018; 1:00 pm, ESPN2	No. 5	at No. 19 Duke	W 72–54	22–2 (10–1)	Cameron Indoor Stadium (5,724); Durham, NC
Feb 11, 2018; 1:00 pm, RSN	No. 5	Georgia Tech	W 85–69	23–2 (11–1)	Edmund P. Joyce Center (8,421); South Bend, IN
Feb 15, 2018; 7:00 pm, ACCN Extra	No. 5	at Virginia	W 83–69	24–2 (12–1)	John Paul Jones Arena (3,038); Charlottesville, VA
Feb 18, 2018; 1:00 pm, ACCN Extra	No. 5	at Boston College	W 89–55	25–2 (13–1)	Conte Forum (2,009); Chestnut Hill, MA
Feb 22, 2018; 7:00 pm, ACCN Extra	No. 5	Virginia Tech	W 89–59	26–2 (14–1)	Edmund P. Joyce Center (8,053); South Bend, IN
Feb 25, 2018; 2:00 pm, ESPN2	No. 5	No. 21 NC State	W 86–67	27–2 (15–1)	Edmund P. Joyce Center (8,786); South Bend, IN
ACC Women's tournament
Mar 02, 2018; 6:00 pm, ACCN Extra	(2) No. 5	vs. (7) Virginia; Quarterfinals	W 83–47	28–2	Greensboro Coliseum; Greensboro, NC
Mar 03, 2018; 2:30 pm, ESPNU	(2) No. 5	vs. (3) No. 11 Florida State; Semifinals	W 90–80	29–2	Greensboro Coliseum (6,160); Greensboro, NC
Mar 04, 2018; 2:00 pm, ESPN2	(2) No. 5	vs. (1) No. 4 Louisville; Championship	L 72–74	29–3	Greensboro Coliseum (7,424); Greensboro, NC
NCAA women's tournament
Mar 16, 2018*; 5:00 pm, ESPN2	(1 S) No. 5	(16 S) Cal State Northridge; First Round	W 99–81	30–3	Edmund P. Joyce Center; South Bend, IN
Mar 18, 2018*; 7:00 pm, ESPN	(1 S) No. 5	(9 S) Villanova; Second Round	W 98–72	31–3	Edmund P. Joyce Center (4,249); South Bend, IN
Mar 24, 2018*; 4:00 pm, ESPN	(1 S) No. 5	vs. (4 S) No. 14 Texas A&M; Sweet Sixteen	W 90–84	32–3	Spokane Arena; Spokane, WA
Mar 26, 2018*; 9:00 pm, ESPN	(1 S) No. 5	vs. (2 S) No. 6 Oregon; Elite Eight	W 84–74	33–3	Spokane Arena (5,226); Spokane, WA
Mar 30, 2018*; 9:00 pm, ESPN2	(1 S) No. 5	vs. (1 A) No. 1 Connecticut; Final Four/Rivalry	W 91–89 ^{OT}	34–3	Nationwide Arena (19,564); Columbus, OH
Apr 01, 2018*; 6:00 pm, ESPN	(1 S) No. 5	vs. (1 KC) No. 4 Mississippi State; Championship Game	W 61–58	35–3	Nationwide Arena (19,599); Columbus, OH
*Non-conference game. ^{#}Rankings from AP Poll. (#) Tournament seedings in parentheses. S=Spokane Region. All times are in Eastern.
