= 2018 NCAA Division I women's basketball championship game =

2018 NCAA Tournament Championship Game
National championship game
Notre Dame Fighting Irish	Mississippi State Bulldogs
ACC	SEC
(34–3)	(37–1)
61	58
Head coach: Muffet McGraw	Head coach: Vic Schaefer
- AP: 5
- Coaches: 6
- AP: 4
- Coaches: 4
	1	2	3	4	Total
Notre Dame Fighting Irish	14	3	24	20	61
Mississippi State Bulldogs	17	13	11	17	58
- Date: April 1, 2018
- Venue: Nationwide Arena, Columbus, Ohio
- MVP: Arike Ogunbowale (Notre Dame)
- Referees: Dee Kantner, Brenda Pantoja, and Joseph Vaszily
- Attendance: 19,599

United States TV coverage
- Network: ESPN
- Announcers: Adam Amin (play-by-play); Kara Lawson (analyst); Rebecca Lobo (analyst); Holly Rowe (sideline)
- Nielsen Ratings: 0.76 (3.54 million)

The 2018 NCAA Division I women's basketball championship game was the final game of the 2018 NCAA Division I women's basketball tournament. The game was played on April 1, 2018, at the Nationwide Arena in Columbus, Ohio. The Notre Dame Fighting Irish defeated the Mississippi State Bulldogs to win their second national championship.

The game was won on a made basket by Arike Ogunbowale with 0.1 seconds left on the clock—she made a similar shot with 1.0 second in the semifinal to defeat Connecticut, earning Notre Dame a berth in the championship.

== Participants ==
=== Mississippi State ===
The Mississippi State Bulldogs were led by sixth-year head coach Vic Schaefer. The Bulldogs opened their season by winning all 15 of their non-conference games, including three wins in the Cancún Challenge and two wins as a part of the Duel in the Desert (played in Paradise, Nevada), adding a win against the No. 9 Oregon Ducks. The Bulldogs entered SEC play ranked No. 5 in the nation, and never dropped below that ranking, as they finished the regular season 30–0, 16–0 in SEC play, including four wins over ranked conference opponents: No. 6 Tennessee, No. 15 Missouri, defending national champions No. 7 South Carolina, and No. 17 Texas A&M. The Bulldogs were seeded first in the SEC tournament, where they defeated (9) Kentucky and (5) Texas A&M en route to the championship game, where they fell to (2) South Carolina, 51–62 for their first loss of the season. The Bulldogs received an at-large bid to the NCAA tournament, where they were seeded first in the Kansas City regional. In the tournament, Mississippi State defeated (16) Nicholls State, (9) Oklahoma State, (4) NC State, and (3) UCLA en route to the Final Four, where they beat (1) Louisville in overtime, putting their record at 37–1.

=== Notre Dame ===
The Notre Dame Fighting Irish were led by 31st-year head coach Muffet McGraw. The Fighting Irish opened their season by winning eleven of their first twelve games, including three wins in the Gulf Coast Showcase and a win in the ACC–Big Ten Women's Challenge, with three of those four being ranked opponents, most notably defending champions No. 3 South Carolina. The Irish suffered their first loss in their eighth game of the season, a matchup with No. 1 Connecticut in the Jimmy V Classic. Notre Dame entered ACC play 11–1, ranked No. 2 in the nation. The Irish performed exceptionally in conference, finishing the regular season 27–2, with fifteen wins from sixteen ACC games, including three wins against ranked conference opponents (No. 8 Florida State, No. 19 Duke, and No. 21 NC State) and one win against a ranked non-conference opponent (No. 8 Tennessee). The Irish's only other loss of the season came against No. 3 Louisville in their fifth conference game; Notre Dame finished the season having won their last twelve games and were seeded second in the ACC tournament, where they defeated (7) Virginia and (3) Florida State en route to the title game, where they once again fell to Louisville. The Irish were seeded first as an at-large bid in the NCAA Tournament's Spokane Regional. On their run to the title game, Notre Dame defeated (16) Cal State Northridge, (9) Villanova, (4) Texas A&M, and (2) Oregon to get to the Final Four, where they faced and defeated (1) Connecticut in overtime via a made basket by Arike Ogunbowale with 1.0 seconds left.

The Irish reached this point despite a severely depleted roster with only seven scholarship players by the start of the NCAA tournament—four players missed part or all of the season to torn ACLs. Brianna Turner, an All-American forward in 2016–17, suffered the injury in the 2017 NCAA tournament and missed the entire season. Senior guard Mychael Johnson was lost in a preseason practice, freshman center Mikayla Vaughn after six games, and starting senior point guard Lili Thompson was lost on New Year's Eve. Before the title game, McGraw told media, "I didn't think we'd have more ACL tears than losses. I think it's just an amazing accomplishment for this team and the resilience they've shown all year."

== Game summary ==
ESPN

April 1, 2018
6:00 p.m.

Report

#1 Notre Dame Fighting Irish 61, #1 Mississippi State Bulldogs 58
Scoring by quarter: 14–17, 3–13, 24–11, 20–17
Pts: J. Shepard – 19; Rebs: K. Westbeld – 9 Asts: M. Mabrey, J. Shepard, J. Young – 2	Pts: V. Vivians – 21; Rebs: T. McCowan – 17; Asts: M. William – 2

Nationwide Arena – Columbus, Ohio
Attendance: 19,599

== Media coverage ==
The Championship Game was televised in the United States by ESPN. Adam Amin gave the play-by-play, with Kara Lawson and Rebecca Lobo as the color analysts, and Holly Rowe as the sideline reporter. Maria Taylor, Lobo, Nell Fortner and Andy Landers provided studio coverage.

== See also ==
- 2018 NCAA Men's Division I Basketball Championship Game
- 2018 NCAA Division I women's basketball tournament
