= 2018 NCAA Division I women's basketball tournament =

American college basketball championship

- Season: 2017–18
- Teams: 64
- Finals site: Nationwide Arena, Columbus, Ohio
- Champions: Notre Dame Fighting Irish (2nd title, 6th title game, 8th Final Four)
- Runner-up: Mississippi State Bulldogs (2nd title game, 2nd Final Four)
- Semifinalists: UConn Huskies (19th Final Four); Louisville Cardinals (3rd Final Four)
- Winning coach: Muffet McGraw (2nd title)
- MOP: Arike Ogunbowale (Notre Dame)

The 2018 NCAA Division I women's basketball tournament began on March 16, 2018, and concluded with the national championship game on Sunday, April 1. The Final Four was played at Nationwide Arena in Columbus, Ohio. This is the third time that the women's Final Four was played in Ohio after previously being held in Cincinnati in 1997 and Cleveland in 2007 and the first time that the women's Final Four was played in Columbus. For only the fourth time in the tournament’s 37-year history, all four of the number one seeds made it to the Final Four (1989, 2012, 2015).

Tennessee continued its record streak of making every NCAA women's basketball tournament at 37 consecutive appearances. Connecticut also continued its record streak of 11 consecutive Final Four appearances.

== Tournament procedure ==
Pending any changes to the format, a total of 64 teams will enter the 2016 tournament. 32 automatic bids shall be awarded to each program that wins their conference's tournament. The remaining 36 bids are "at-large", with selections extended by the NCAA Selection Committee. The tournament is split into four regional tournaments, and each regional has teams seeded from 1 to 16, with the committee ostensibly making every region as comparable to the others as possible. The top-seeded team in each region plays the #16 team, the #2 team plays the #15, etc. (meaning where the two seeds add up to 17, that team will be assigned to play another).

The basis for the subregionals returned to the approach used between 1982 and 2002; the top sixteen teams, as chosen in the bracket selection process, hosted the first two rounds on campus.

The selection committee will also seed the entire field from 1 to 64.

== Schedule and venues ==
The first two rounds, also referred to as the subregionals, were played at the sites of the top 16 seeds, as was done in 2016 and 2017. The following are the sites selected to host the last four rounds of the 2018 tournament.

First and Second rounds (Subregionals)

- March 16–18
  - KFC Yum! Center, Louisville, Kentucky (Host: University of Louisville)
  - Thompson–Boling Arena, Knoxville, Tennessee (Host: University of Tennessee)
  - Reed Arena, College Station, Texas (Host: Texas A&M University)
  - Reynolds Coliseum, Raleigh, North Carolina (Host: North Carolina State University)
  - Edmund P. Joyce Center, Notre Dame, Indiana (Host: University of Notre Dame)
  - Colonial Life Arena, Columbia, South Carolina (Host: University of South Carolina)
  - Matthew Knight Arena, Eugene, Oregon (Host: University of Oregon)
  - Ferrell Center, Waco, Texas (Host: Baylor University)
- March 17–19
  - Harry A. Gampel Pavilion, Storrs, Connecticut (Host: University of Connecticut)
  - Stegeman Coliseum, Athens, Georgia (Host: University of Georgia)
  - St. John Arena, Columbus, Ohio (Host: Ohio State University)
  - Donald L. Tucker Civic Center, Tallahassee, Florida (Host: Florida State University)
  - Humphrey Coliseum, Starkville, Mississippi (Host: Mississippi State University)
  - Maples Pavilion, Stanford, California (Host: Stanford University)
  - Pauley Pavilion, Los Angeles, California (Host: University of California, Los Angeles)
  - Frank Erwin Center, Austin, Texas (Host: University of Texas at Austin)

Regional semifinals and finals (Sweet Sixteen and Elite Eight)

2018 NCAA regionals and Final Four
- March 23–25
  - Kansas City regional, Sprint Center, Kansas City, Missouri (Host: Big 12)
  - Lexington regional, Rupp Arena, Lexington, Kentucky (Host: University of Kentucky)
- March 24–26
  - Albany regional, Times Union Center, Albany, New York (Hosts: MAAC)
  - Spokane regional, Veterans Memorial Arena, Spokane, Washington (Host: University of Idaho)

National semifinals and Championship (Final Four and Championship)

- March 30 and April 1
  - Nationwide Arena, Columbus, Ohio (Host: Ohio State University)

== Subregionals tournament and automatic qualifiers ==
Selections for the 2018 NCAA Division I Women’s Basketball Championship were announced at 7 p.m. Eastern time, Monday, March 12 via ESPN.

The basis for the subregionals returned to the approach used between 1982 and 2002; the top sixteen teams, as chosen in the bracket selection process, hosted the first two rounds on campus.

A total of 64 teams entered the 2018 tournament. 32 automatic bids teams were given to teams that won their conference tournament. The remaining 32 teams were granted "at-large" bids, which were extended by the NCAA Selection Committee.

The selection committee also seeded the entire field from 1 to 64.

=== Automatic qualifiers ===
The following teams automatically qualified for the 2018 NCAA field by virtue of winning their conference's tournament.

Conference	Team	Record	Appearance	Last bid
ACC	Louisville	32–2	21st	2017
America East	Maine	23–9	8th	2004
American	Connecticut	32–0	30th	2017
Atlantic 10	George Washington	19–13	18th	2016
Atlantic Sun	Florida Gulf Coast	30–4	5th	2017
Big 12	Baylor	31–1	17th	2017
Big East	DePaul	26–7	23rd	2017
Big Sky	Northern Colorado	26–6	1st	Never
Big South	Liberty	24–9	17th	2013
Big Ten	Ohio State	27–6	25th	2017
Big West	Cal State Northridge	19–15	4th	2015
Colonial	Elon	25–7	2nd	2017
C-USA	Western Kentucky	24–8	20th	2017
Horizon	Green Bay	29–3	18th	2017
Ivy League	Princeton	24–5	7th	2016
MAAC	Quinnipiac	27–5	4th	2017
Mid-American	Central Michigan	28–4	4th	2013
MEAC	North Carolina A&T	23–8	4th	2016
Missouri Valley	Drake	26–7	12th	2017
Mountain West	Boise State	23–9	5th	2017
Northeast	Saint Francis (PA)	24–9	12th	2011
Ohio Valley	Belmont	31–3	4th	2017
Pac-12	Oregon	30–4	14th	2017
Patriot	American	26–6	2nd	2015
SEC	South Carolina	26–6	15th	2017
Southern	Mercer	30–2	1st	Never
Southland	Nicholls State	19–13	1st	Never
SWAC	Grambling State	19–13	6th	1999
Summit	South Dakota State	26–6	8th	2016
Sun Belt	Little Rock	23–9	5th	2015
West Coast	Gonzaga	27–5	10th	2017
WAC	Seattle	18–14	1st	Never

=== Tournament seeds ===
Albany regional – Times Union Center, Albany, New York
Seed	School	Conference	Record	RPI	Berth type
1	Connecticut	American	32–0	1	Automatic
2	South Carolina	SEC	26–6	11	Automatic
3	Florida State	ACC	25–6	8	At-large
4	Georgia	SEC	25–6	26	At-Large
5	Duke	ACC	22–8	19	At-Large
6	South Florida	American	26–7	14	At-Large
7	California	Pac-12	21–10	43	At-Large
8	Miami (FL)	ACC	21–10	53	At-Large
9	Quinnipiac	MAAC	27–5	37	Automatic
10	Virginia	ACC	18–13	33	At-Large
11	Buffalo	Mid-American	27–5	22	At-Large
12	Belmont	Ohio Valley	31–3	57	Automatic
13	Mercer	Southern	30–2	48	Automatic
14	Little Rock	Sun Belt	23–9	88	Automatic
15	North Carolina A&T	MEAC	23–8	154	Automatic
16	Saint Francis (PA)	Northeast	24–9	99	Automatic

Lexington regional – Rupp Arena, Lexington, Kentucky
Seed	School	Conference	Record	RPI	Berth type
1	Louisville	ACC	32–2	3	Automatic
2	Baylor	Big 12	31–1	4	Automatic
3	Tennessee	SEC	24–7	9	At-Large
4	Stanford	Pac-12	22–10	13	At-Large
5	Missouri	SEC	24–7	24	At-Large
6	Oregon State	Pac-12	23–7	42	At-Large
7	Michigan	Big Ten	22–9	39	At-Large
8	Marquette	Big East	23–9	25	At-Large
9	Dayton	Atlantic 10	23–6	36	At-Large
10	Northern Colorado	Big Sky	26–6	32	Automatic
11	Western Kentucky	C-USA	24–8	50	Automatic
12	Florida Gulf Coast	Atlantic Sun	30–4	47	Automatic
13	Gonzaga	West Coast	27–5	34	Automatic
14	Liberty	Big South	24–9	82	Automatic
15	Grambling State	SWAC	19–13	210	Automatic
16	Boise State	Mountain West	23–9	111	Automatic

Kansas City regional – Sprint Center, Kansas City, Missouri
Seed	School	Conference	Record	RPI	Berth type
1	Mississippi State	SEC	32–1	5	At-Large
2	Texas	Big 12	26–6	12	At-Large
3	UCLA	Pac-12	24–7	10	At-Large
4	NC State	ACC	24–8	17	At-Large
5	Maryland	Big Ten	25–7	18	At-Large
6	Iowa	Big Ten	24–7	21	At-Large
7	Arizona State	Pac-12	21–12	55	At-Large
8	Syracuse	ACC	22–8	38	At-Large
9	Oklahoma State	Big 12	20–10	58	At-Large
10	Nebraska	Big Ten	21–10	60	At-Large
11	Creighton	Big East	18–12	49	At-Large
12	Princeton	Ivy League	24–5	27	Automatic
13	Elon	Colonial	25–7	31	Automatic
14	American	Patriot	26–6	46	Automatic
15	Maine	America East	23–9	70	Automatic
16	Nicholls State	Southland	19–13	189	Automatic

Spokane regional – Spokane Veterans Memorial Arena, Spokane, Washington
Seed	School	Conference	Record	RPI	Berth type
1	Notre Dame	ACC	29–3	2	At-Large
2	Oregon	Pac-12	30–4	7	Automatic
3	Ohio State	Big Ten	27–6	6	Automatic
4	Texas A&M	SEC	24–9	16	At-Large
5	DePaul	Big East	26–7	20	Automatic
6	LSU	SEC	19–9	29	At-Large
7	Green Bay	Horizon	29–3	23	Automatic
8	South Dakota State	Summit	26–6	28	Automatic
9	Villanova	Big East	22–8	30	At-Large
10	Minnesota	Big Ten	23–8	41	At-Large
11	Central Michigan	Mid-American	28–4	15	Automatic
12	Oklahoma	Big 12	16–14	35	At-Large
13	Drake	Missouri Valley	26–7	63	Automatic
14	George Washington	Atlantic 10	19–13	77	Automatic
15	Seattle	WAC	18–14	196	Automatic
16	Cal State Northridge	Big West	19–15	178	Automatic

== Tournament records ==
- Mississippi State's Teaira McCowan recorded 109 rebounds, setting the record for the most rebounds in a tournament.
- Texas hit 103 of 178 field-goal attempts, hitting 57.9% of the attempts, setting a record for the highest field-goal percentage in a tournament.

== Bracket ==
All times are listed as Eastern Daylight Time (UTC−4)
* – Denotes overtime period

=== Albany Regional – Albany, New York ===
First Round; Round Of 64; March 16–17
1	UConn	140
16	Saint Francis	52
Storrs, Connecticut (Sat/Mon)
8	Miami (FL)	72
9	Quinnipiac	86
5	Duke	72
12	Belmont	58
Athens, Georgia (Sat/Mon)
4	Georgia	68
13	Mercer	63
6	South Florida	79
11	Buffalo	102
Tallahassee, Florida (Sat/Mon)
3	Florida State	91
14	Little Rock	49
7	California	62
10	Virginia	68
Columbia, South Carolina (Fri/Sun)
2	South Carolina	63
15	North Carolina A&T	52

Second Round; Round Of 32; March 18–19
1	UConn	71
9	Quinnipiac	46
5	Duke	66
4	Georgia	40
11	Buffalo	86
3	Florida State	65
10	Virginia	56
2	South Carolina	66

Regional Semifinals; Sweet 16; March 24
1	UConn	72
5	Duke	59
11	Buffalo	63
2	South Carolina	79

Regional Final; Elite 8 March 26
1	UConn	94
2	South Carolina	65

==== Albany Regional Final ====
ESPN

Monday, March 26
7:00 pm

Box Score

#1 Connecticut Huskies 94, #2 South Carolina Gamecocks 65
Scoring by quarter: 30–12, 24–21, 22–14, 18–18
Pts: G. Williams 23; Rebs: N. Collier 7 Asts: K. Samuelson 7	Pts: A. Wilson 27; Rebs: A. Wilson 8 Asts: D. Cliney/T. Harris/B. Jackson/A. Jennings 2

Times Union Center – Albany, New York
Attendance: 9,522
Referees: Eric Brewton, Roy Gulbeyan, Brenda Pantoja

==== Albany Regional all tournament team ====
- Gabby Williams, UConn (MOP)
- Cierra Dillard, Buffalo
- A'ja Wilson, South Carolina
- Crystal Dangerfield, UConn
- Katie Lou Samuelson, UConn

=== Kansas City Regional – Kansas City, Missouri ===
First Round; Round Of 64; March 16–17
1	Mississippi State	95
16	Nicholls State	50
Starkville, Mississippi (Sat/Mon)
8	Syracuse	57
9	Oklahoma State	84
5	Maryland	77
12	Princeton	57
Raleigh, North Carolina (Fri/Sun)
4	NC State	62
13	Elon	35
6	Iowa	70
11	Creighton	76
Los Angeles, California (Sat/Mon)
3	UCLA	71
14	American	60
7	Arizona State	73
10	Nebraska	62
Austin, Texas (Sat/Mon)
2	Texas	83
15	Maine	54

Second Round; Round Of 32; March 18–19
1	Mississippi State	71
9	Oklahoma State	56
5	Maryland	60
4	NC State	74
11	Creighton	64
3	UCLA	86
7	Arizona State	65
2	Texas	85

Regional Semifinals; Sweet 16; March 23
1	Mississippi State	71
4	NC State	57
3	UCLA	84
2	Texas	75

Regional Final; Elite 8 March 25
1	Mississippi State	89
3	UCLA	73

==== Kansas City Regional final ====
ESPN

Sunday, March 25
7:30 pm

Box Score

#1 Mississippi State Bulldogs 89, #3 UCLA Bruins 73
Scoring by quarter: 23–17, 19–9, 21–24, 26–23
Pts: V. Vivians 24; Rebs: T. McCowan 21; Asts: R. Johnson/M. William 5	Pts: J. Canada 23; Rebs: J. Canada 8 Asts: J. Canada 5

Sprint Center – Kansas City, MO
Attendance: 4,089
Referees: Tina Napier, Charles Gonzalez, Susan Blauch

==== Kansas City Regional all tournament team ====
- Teaira McCowan, Mississippi State (Co-MOP)
- Victoria Vivians, Mississippi State (Co-MOP)
- Kiara Leslie, NC State
- Jordin Canada, UCLA
- Monique Billings, UCLA

=== Lexington Regional – Lexington, Kentucky ===
First Round; Round Of 64; March 16–17
1	Louisville	74
16	Boise State	42
Louisville, Kentucky (Fri/Sun)
8	Marquette	84
9	Dayton	65
5	Missouri	70
12	Florida Gulf Coast	80
Stanford, California (Sat/Mon)
4	Stanford	82
13	Gonzaga	68
6	Oregon State	82
11	Western Kentucky	58
Knoxville, Tennessee (Fri/Sun)
3	Tennessee	100
14	Liberty	60
7	Michigan	75
10	Northern Colorado	61
Waco, Texas (Fri/Sun)
2	Baylor	96
15	Grambling State	46

Second Round; Round Of 32; March 18–19
1	Louisville	90
8	Marquette	72
12	Florida Gulf Coast	70
4	Stanford	90
6	Oregon State	66
3	Tennessee	59
7	Michigan	58
2	Baylor	80

Regional Semifinals; Sweet 16; March 23
1	Louisville	86
4	Stanford	59
6	Oregon State	72
2	Baylor	67

Regional Final; Elite 8 March 25
1	Louisville	76
6	Oregon State	43

==== Lexington Regional Final ====
ESPN

Sunday, March 25
12:00 pm

Summary

#1 Louisville Cardinals 76, #6 Oregon State Beavers 43
Scoring by quarter: 14–8, 17–16, 28–12, 17–7
Pts: A. Durr 18; Rebs: J. Jones 6 Asts: K. McWilliams	Pts: M. Gülich 14; Rebs: M. Gülich 8 Asts: D. Evans 5

Rupp Arena – Lexington, KY
Attendance: 6,268
Referees: Dee Kantner, Jesse Dickerson, Michol Murray

==== Lexington Regional all tournament team ====
- Asia Durr, Louisville (MOP)
- Myisha Hines-Allen, Louisville
- Arica Carter, Louisville
- Sam Fuehring, Louisville
- Marie Gülich, Oregon State

=== Spokane Regional – Spokane, Washington ===
First Round; Round Of 64; March 16–17
1	Notre Dame	99
16	Cal State Northridge	81
Notre Dame, Indiana (Fri/Sun)
8	South Dakota State	74
9	Villanova	81*
5	DePaul	90
12	Oklahoma	79
College Station, Texas (Fri/Sun)
4	Texas A&M	89
13	Drake	76
6	LSU	69
11	Central Michigan	78
Columbus, Ohio (Sat/Mon)
3	Ohio State	87
14	George Washington	45
7	Green Bay	77
10	Minnesota	89
Eugene, Oregon (Fri/Sun)
2	Oregon	88
15	Seattle	45

Second Round; Round Of 32; March 18–19
1	Notre Dame	98
9	Villanova	72
5	DePaul	79
4	Texas A&M	80
11	Central Michigan	95
3	Ohio State	78
10	Minnesota	73
2	Oregon	101

Regional Semifinals; Sweet 16; March 24
1	Notre Dame	90
4	Texas A&M	84
11	Central Michigan	68
2	Oregon	83

Regional Final; Elite 8 March 26
1	Notre Dame	84
2	Oregon	74

==== Spokane Regional Final ====
ESPN

Monday, March 26
9:00 pm

Summary

#1 Notre Dame Fighting Irish 84, #2 Oregon Ducks 74
Scoring by quarter: 22–21, 18–25, 21–9, 23–19
Pts: K. Westbeld 20; Rebs: J. Young 13; Asts: M. Mabrey 7	Pts: S. Ionescu 26; Rebs: R. Hebard 10; Asts: S. Ionescu 4

Spokane Veterans Memorial Arena – Spokane, WA
Attendance: 5,226
Referees: Lisa Mattingly, Penny Davis, Kevin Pethtel

==== Spokane Regional all tournament team ====
- Arike Ogunbowale, Notre Dame (MOP)
- Marina Mabrey, Notre Dame
- Chennedy Carter, Texas A&M
- Sabrina Ionescu, Oregon
- Ruthy Hebard, Oregon

== Final Four ==
During the Final Four round, regardless of the seeds of the participating teams, the champion of the top overall top seed's region (Connecticut's Albany Region) plays against the champion of the fourth-ranked top seed's region (Notre Dame's Spokane Region), and the champion of the second overall top seed's region (Mississippi State's Kansas City Region) plays against the champion of the third-ranked top seed's region (Louisville's Lexington Region).

=== Nationwide Arena – Columbus, Ohio ===
National Semifinals; Final Four; March 30
A1	UConn	89
S1	Notre Dame	91*
KC1	Mississippi State	73*
L1	Louisville	63

National Championship Game; April 1
S1	Notre Dame	61
KC1	Mississippi State	58

* – Denotes overtime period

==== Final Four ====
ESPN2

Friday, March 30
7:00 pm

Report

#1 Mississippi State Bulldogs 73, #1 Louisville Cardinals 63 (OT)
Scoring by quarter: 13–11, 18–19, 15–18, 13–11, Overtime: 14–4
Pts: Vivians – 25; Rebs: McCowan – 25; Asts: William – 4	Pts: Durr – 18; Rebs: Jones – 9 Asts: Carter – 3

Nationwide Arena – Columbus, OH
Attendance: 19,564
Referees: Lisa Mattingly, Penny Davis, Denise Brooks

ESPN2

Friday, March 30
9:52 pm

Report

#1 Connecticut Huskies 89, #1 Notre Dame Fighting Irish 91 (OT)
Scoring by quarter: 14–24, 27–10, 19–23, 19–22, Overtime: 10–12
Pts: Collier – 24; Rebs: Williams – 10; Asts: Williams – 7	Pts: Young – 32; Rebs: Shepard, Young – 11; Asts: Shepard, Westbeld – 5

Nationwide Arena – Columbus, OH
Attendance: 19,564
Referees: Lisa Jones, Michael McConnell, Karen Preato

==== National Championship ====
ESPN

Sunday, April 1
12:00 pm

Report

#1 Notre Dame Fighting Irish 61, #1 Mississippi State Bulldogs 58
Scoring by quarter: 14–17, 3–13, 24–11, 20–17
Pts: J. Shepard – 19; Rebs: K. Westbeld – 9 Asts: Three tied – 2	Pts: V. Vivians – 21; Rebs: T. McCowan – 17; Asts: M. William – 2

Nationwide Arena – Columbus, OH
Attendance: 19,599
Referees: Dee Kantner, Brenda Pantoja, Joseph Vaszily

==== Final Four all-tournament team ====
- Arike Ogunbowale, Notre Dame (MOP)
- Jessica Shepard, Notre Dame
- Victoria Vivians, Mississippi State
- Teaira McCowan, Mississippi State
- Napheesa Collier, Connecticut

== Record by conference ==
Conference	Bids	Record	Win %	R64	R32	S16	E8	F4	CG	NC
ACC	8	16–7	.696	8	6	4	2	2	1	1
SEC	7	12–7	.632	7	5	3	2	1	1	–
American	2	4–2	.667	2	1	1	1	1	–	–
Pac-12	6	12–6	.667	6	5	4	3	–	–	–
Big 12	4	5–4	.556	4	3	2	–	–	–	–
Mid-American	2	4–2	.667	2	2	2	–	–	–	–
Big Ten	6	4–6	.400	6	4	–	–	–	–	–
Big East	4	4–4	.500	4	4	–	–	–	–	–
MAAC	1	1–1	.500	1	1	–	–	–	–	–
Atlantic Sun	1	1–1	.500	1	1	–	–	–	–	–
Atlantic 10	2	0–2	.000	2	–	–	–	–	–	–

- The R64, R32, S16, E8, F4, CG, and NC columns indicate how many teams from each conference were in the round of 64 (first round), round of 32 (second round), Sweet 16, Elite Eight, Final Four, championship game, and national champion, respectively.
- The America East, Big Sky, Big South, Big West, Conference USA, Colonial, Horizon, Ivy League, MEAC, Missouri Valley, Mountain West, Northeast, Ohio Valley, Patriot, Southern, Southland, Summit, Sun Belt, SWAC, WAC and West Coast conferences each had one representative that was eliminated in the first round.

== Media coverage ==
=== Television ===
ESPN had US television rights to all games during the tournament. During the first and second rounds, ESPN aired select games nationally on ESPN2, ESPNU, and ESPNews. All other games aired regionally on ESPN, ESPN2, or ESPN3 and were streamed online via WatchESPN. Most of the nation got whip-a-round coverage during this time, which allowed ESPN to rotate between the games and focus the nation on the game that had the closest score.

==== Studio host and analysts ====
- Maria Taylor (Host)
- Andy Landers (Analyst)
- Rebecca Lobo (Analyst) (First, Second rounds, Final Four and National championship game)
- Nell Fortner (Analyst) (Regionals, Final Four and National championship game)

==== Broadcast assignments ====
First & second rounds Friday/Sunday

- Beth Mowins and Nell Fortner – Louisville, Kentucky
- Brenda VanLengen and Carol Ross – Knoxville, Tennessee
- Lowell Galindo and Andraya Carter – College Station, Texas
- John Brickley and Mike Thibault – Raleigh, North Carolina
- Roy Philpott and Brooke Weisbrod – Notre Dame, Indiana
- Paul Sunderland and Steffi Sorensen – Columbia, South Carolina
- Dave Pasch and LaChina Robinson – Eugene, Oregon
- Eric Frede and Christy Thomaskutty – Waco, Texas

Sweet Sixteen & Elite Eight Friday/Sunday

- Beth Mowins, Debbie Antonelli, and Allison Williams – Lexington, Kentucky
- Pam Ward, Gail Goestenkors, and Courtney Lyle – Kansas City, Missouri

Final Four

- Adam Amin, Kara Lawson, Rebecca Lobo, and Holly Rowe – Columbus, Ohio

First & second rounds Saturday/Monday

- Adam Amin and Kara Lawson – Storrs, Connecticut
- Melissa Lee and Amanda Butler – Athens, Georgia
- Sam Gore and Christy Winters-Scott – Columbus, Ohio
- Clay Matvick and Katie Smith – Tallahassee, Florida
- Courtney Lyle and Tamika Catchings – Starkville, Mississippi
- Elise Woodward and Dan Hughes – Stanford, California
- Tiffany Greene and Chiney Ogwumike – Los Angeles, California
- Pam Ward and Gail Goestenkors – Austin, Texas

Sweet Sixteen & Elite Eight Saturday/Monday

- Adam Amin, Kara Lawson, Rebecca Lobo, and Holly Rowe – Albany, New York
- Dave Pasch, LaChina Robinson, and Molly McGrath – Spokane, Washington

Championship

- Adam Amin, Kara Lawson, Rebecca Lobo, and Holly Rowe – Columbus, Ohio

=== Radio ===
Westwood One had exclusive radio rights to the entire tournament. Teams participating in the regional finals, Final Four, and Championship were allowed to have their own local broadcasts, but they weren’t allowed to stream those broadcasts online.

Regional finals Sunday

- Justin Kutcher and Ann Schatz – Lexington, Kentucky
- Ted Emrich and Krista Blunk – Kansas City, Missouri

Final Four

- John Sadak, Debbie Antonelli, and Krista Blunk – Columbus, Ohio

Regional finals Monday

- John Sadak and Debbie Antonelli – Albany, New York
- Dick Fain and Kristen Kozlowski – Spokane, Washington

Championship

- John Sadak, Debbie Antonelli, and Krista Blunk – Columbus, Ohio

== See also ==
- 2018 NCAA Division I men's basketball tournament
- 2018 NCAA Division II men's basketball tournament
- 2018 NCAA Division III men's basketball tournament
- 2018 NCAA Division II women's basketball tournament
- 2018 Women's National Invitation Tournament
- 2018 U Sports Women's Basketball Championship
- 2018 National Invitation Tournament
- 2018 NAIA Division I women's basketball tournament
- 2018 NAIA Division II women's basketball tournament
- 2018 NAIA Division I men's basketball tournament
- 2018 NAIA Division II men's basketball tournament
- 2018 Women's Basketball Invitational
- 2018 College Basketball Invitational
- 2018 CollegeInsider.com Postseason Tournament
