= 2017–18 Virginia Tech Hokies women's basketball team =

Intercollegiate basketball season

2017–18 Virginia Tech Hokies women's basketball

WNIT, Runner-up
- Conference: Atlantic Coast Conference
- Record: 23–14 (6–10 ACC)
- Head coach: Kenny Brooks (2nd season)
- Assistant coaches: Britney Anderson; Jennifer Brown; Shawn Poppie
- Home arena: Cassell Coliseum

2017–18 ACC women's basketball standings
	Conf.				Overall
Team	W		L	PCT	W		L	PCT
No. 3 Louisville *†	15	–	1	.938	36	–	3	.923
No. 5 Notre Dame	15	–	1	.938	35	–	3	.921
No. 11 Florida State	12	–	4	.750	26	–	7	.788
No. 21 NC State	11	–	5	.688	26	–	9	.743
No. 20 Duke	11	–	5	.688	24	–	9	.727
Syracuse	10	–	6	.625	22	–	9	.710
Miami (FL)	10	–	6	.625	21	–	11	.656
Virginia	10	–	6	.625	19	–	14	.576
Virginia Tech	6	–	10	.375	23	–	14	.622
Georgia Tech	6	–	10	.375	20	–	14	.588
Wake Forest	5	–	11	.313	14	–	17	.452
North Carolina	4	–	12	.250	15	–	16	.484
Pittsburgh	2	–	14	.125	10	–	20	.333
Boston College	2	–	14	.125	7	–	23	.233
Clemson	1	–	15	.063	11	–	19	.367
† 2018 ACC tournament winner * Tournament #1 seed As of 31 March 2018; Rankings from AP poll

The 2017–18 Virginia Tech Hokies women's basketball team represented Virginia Polytechnic Institute and State University during the 2017–18 NCAA Division I women's basketball season. The Hokies, led by second-year head coach Kenny Brooks, played their home games at Cassell Coliseum as members of the Atlantic Coast Conference. They finished the season 23–14, 6–10 in ACC play to finish in a tie for ninth place. They advanced to the quarterfinals of the ACC women's tournament, where they lost to Louisville. They received an automatic bid to the Women's National Invitation Tournament, where they defeated Navy, George Mason and Fordham in the first, second and third rounds, Alabama in the quarterfinals, and West Virginia in the semifinals, to advance to the championship game, where they lost to Indiana.

== Previous season ==
They finished the season 20–14, 4–12 in ACC play to finish in a tie for eleventh place. They lost in the first round of the ACC women's tournament to Clemson. They were invited to the Women's National Invitation Tournament, where they defeated Rider, Navy and Penn State in the first, second and third rounds before losing to Michigan in the quarterfinals.

== Media ==
=== Virginia Tech Hokies Sports Network ===
The Virginia Tech Hokies IMG Sports Network broadcast Hokies games on WNMX. Andrew Allegretta provided the call for the games and for select ESPN3 games.

== Roster ==
2017–18 Virginia Tech Hokies women's basketball team
Players
Coaches

Pos.	#	Name	Height	Year	Previous school	Hometown
G	1	Taylor Emery	5 ft 10 in (1.78 m)	Jr	Freedom; Tulane/Gulf Coast State	Tampa, FL
G	2	Aisha Sheppard	5 ft 9 in (1.75 m)	Fr	St. John's	Alexandria, VA
G	3	Diandra DaRosa	5 ft 7 in (1.7 m)	Sr	William E. Tolman; ASA College	Pawtucket, RI
G	10	Kendyl Brooks	5 ft 8 in (1.73 m)	So	Spotswood	Harrisonburg, VA
F	11	Regan Magarity	6 ft 3 in (1.91 m)	RS Jr	Igelstavikens Gymnasium	Norrköping, Sweden
G	12	Chanette Hicks	5 ft 6 in (1.68 m)	Jr	Maury	Norfolk, VA
G	14	Kaela Kinder	5 ft 10 in (1.78 m)	So	Christ the King	Inwood, NY
F	20	Michelle Berry	6 ft 2 in (1.88 m)	RS So	Miami Country Day; Cal State Fullerton	Miami, FL
F	22	Sierra Votaw	6 ft 1 in (1.85 m)	Fr	Harrells Christian	Harrells, NC
G	23	Rachel Camp	5 ft 11 in (1.8 m)	RS Jr	East Rutherford	Forest City, NC
F	25	Alexis Jean	6 ft 1 in (1.85 m)	Jr	Treasure Coast; Kennesaw State/Palm Beach State	Port St. Lucie, FL
F	40	Erinn Brooks	5 ft 9 in (1.75 m)	Jr	Franklin County	Union Hall, VA
F/C	55	Celeste Akoro	6 ft 2 in (1.88 m)	Fr	O'Fallon Township	O'Fallon, IL

Head coach

- Kenny Brooks (James Madison)

Assistant coach(es)

- Britney Anderson (Virginia Tech)
- Jennifer Brown (James Madison)
- Shawn Poppie (Limestone)

Legend

- (C) Team captain
- (S) Suspended
- (I) Ineligible
- (W) Walk-on
- Injured
- Current redshirt

Roster
Last update: February 25, 2018

== Schedule ==
Date time, TV	Rank^{#}	Opponent^{#}	Result	Record	Site (attendance) city, state
Non-conference regular season
November 10, 2017*; 3:30 pm, ACCN Extra		Wagner	W 99–32	1–0	Cassell Coliseum (2,086); Blacksburg, VA
November 13, 2017*; 7:00 pm, ACCN Extra		Auburn	W 72–63	2–0	Cassell Coliseum (2,156); Blacksburg, VA
November 17, 2017*; 9:00 pm, ACCN Extra		USC Upstate	W 87–56	3–0	Cassell Coliseum (2,162); Blacksburg, VA
November 19, 2017*; 6:30 pm, ACCN Extra		UCF	W 86–69	4–0	Cassell Coliseum (2,166); Blacksburg, VA
November 23, 2017*; 2:30 pm, FloHoops		vs. Drexel; Paradise Jam Tournament Island Division	W 79–67	5–0	Titan Field House (674); Melbourne, FL
November 24, 2017*; 6:00 pm, FloHoops		vs. Butler; Paradise Jam Tournament Island Division	L 77–79	5–1	Titan Field House (369); Melbourne, FL
November 25, 2017*; 6:00 pm, FloHoops		vs. No. 11 West Virginia; Paradise Jam Tournament Island Division	L 61–79	5–2	Titan Field House (276); Melbourne, FL
November 30, 2017*; 8:00 pm, BTN Plus		at Illinois; ACC–Big Ten Women's Challenge	W 96–49	6–2	State Farm Center (1,339); Champaign, IL
December 3, 2017*; 2:00 pm, ACCN Extra		Radford; Rivalry	W 68–42	7–2	Cassell Coliseum (2,388); Blacksburg, VA
December 6, 2017*; 8:30 pm, ACCN Extra		Maryland Eastern Shore	W 90–52	8–2	Cassell Coliseum (2,027); Blacksburg, VA
December 10, 2017*; 3:30 pm, ESPN3		at Chattanooga	W 64–44	9–2	McKenzie Arena (3,676); Chattanooga, TN
December 12, 2017*; 7:00 pm, ESPN3		at Monmouth	W 74–34	10–2	OceanFirst Bank Center (980); West Long Branch, NJ
December 16, 2017*; 6:00 pm, ACCN Extra		High Point	W 86–63	11–2	Cassell Coliseum (2,388); Blacksburg, VA
ACC regular season
December 28, 2017; 2:30 pm, ACCN Extra		NC State	L 51–68	11–3 (0–1)	Cassell Coliseum (2,132); Blacksburg, VA
December 31, 2017; 2:00 pm, ACCN Extra		Boston College	W 89–58	12–3 (1–1)	Cassell Coliseum (2,349); Blacksburg, VA
January 7, 2018; 2:00 pm, ACCN Extra		at No. 3 Louisville	L 56–67	12–4 (1–2)	KFC Yum! Center (7,523); Louisville, KY
January 11, 2018; 7:00 pm, ACCN Extra		Pittsburgh	W 89–66	13–4 (2–2)	Cassell Coliseum (2,256); Blacksburg, VA
January 14, 2018; 2:30 pm, RSN		at No. 13 Florida State	L 62–107	13–5 (2–3)	Donald L. Tucker Center (4,983); Tallahassee, FL
January 18, 2018; 7:00 pm, ACCN Extra		No. 15 Duke	L 75–86	13–6 (2–4)	Cassell Coliseum (2,365); Blacksburg, VA
January 21, 2018; 12:30 pm, ACCN Extra		at Virginia; Commonwealth Clash	L 52–61	13–7 (2–5)	John Paul Jones Arena (4,212); Charlottesville, VA
January 25, 2018; 7:00 pm, ACCN Extra		Georgia Tech	W 68–62	14–7 (3–5)	Cassell Coliseum (2,179); Blacksburg, VA
January 28, 2018; 2:00 pm, ACCN Extra		Miami	L 78–82	14–8 (3–6)	Cassell Coliseum (2,878); Blacksburg, VA
February 1, 2018; 7:00 pm, ACCN Extra		at Syracuse	W 73–64	15–8 (4–6)	Carrier Dome (1,416); Syracuse, NY
February 7, 2018; 7:00 pm, ACCN Extra		at North Carolina	W 90–74	16–8 (5–6)	Carmichael Arena (2,744); Chapel Hill, NC
February 11, 2018; 2:00 pm, ACCN Extra		Virginia; Commonwealth Clash	L 62–64	16–9 (5–7)	Cassell Coliseum (2,733); Blacksburg, VA
February 15, 2018; 7:00 pm, ACCN Extra		at Wake Forest	L 56–73	16–10 (5–8)	LJVM Coliseum (485); Winston–Salem, NC
February 18, 2018; 2:00 pm, ACCN Extra		Clemson	W 53–45	17–10 (6–8)	Cassell Coliseum (2,425); Blacksburg, VA
February 22, 2018; 7:00 pm, ACCN Extra		No. 5 Notre Dame	L 59–89	17–11 (6–9)	Purcell Pavilion (8,053); South Bend, IN
February 25, 2018; 4:00 pm, ACCN Extra		Miami	L 46–76	17–12 (6–10)	Watsco Center (1,165); Coral Gables, FL
ACC Women's Tournament
March 1, 2018; 2:00 pm, ACCN Extra	(8)	vs. (9) Syracuse; Second Round	W 85–70	18–12	Greensboro Coliseum; Greensboro, NC
March 2, 2018; 2:00 pm, ACCN Extra	(8)	vs. (1) No. 4 Louisville; Quarterfinals	L 70–73	18–13	Greensboro Coliseum (3,297); Greensboro, NC
WNIT
March 16, 2018*; 7:00 pm, ACCN Extra		Navy; First Round	W 56–55	19–13	Cassell Coliseum (828); Blacksburg, VA
March 18, 2018*; 2:00 pm, ACCN Extra		George Mason; Second Round	W 78–69	20–13	Cassell Coliseum (774); Blacksburg, VA
March 22, 2018*; 7:00 pm		Fordham; Third Round	W 81–50	21–13	Cassell Coliseum (950); Blacksburg, VA
March 25, 2018*; 2:00 pm, ACCN Extra		Alabama; Quarterfinals	W 74–67	22–13	Cassell Coliseum (1,067); Blacksburg, VA
March 28, 2018*; 7:00 pm		at West Virginia; Semifinals	W 64–61	23–13	WVU Coliseum (3,015); Morgantown, WV
March 31, 2018*; 3:00 pm, CBSSN		at Indiana; Championship Game	L 57–65	23–14	Simon Skjodt Assembly Hall (13,007); Bloomington, IN
*Non-conference game. ^{#}Rankings from AP Poll. (#) Tournament seedings in parentheses. All times are in Eastern.

== Rankings ==
Regular season polls
Poll	Pre- season	Week 2	Week 3	Week 4	Week 5	Week 6	Week 7	Week 8	Week 9	Week 10	Week 11	Week 12	Week 13	Week 14	Week 15	Week 16	Week 17	Week 18	Week 19	Final
AP									RV											N/A
Coaches	RV	RV	RV		RV	RV	RV	RV		RV								RV	RV	RV

Legend
	Increase in ranking
	Decrease in ranking
	No change
(RV)	Received votes
(NR)	Not ranked

== See also ==
- 2017–18 Virginia Tech Hokies men's basketball team
