= Divine Savior Holy Angels High School =

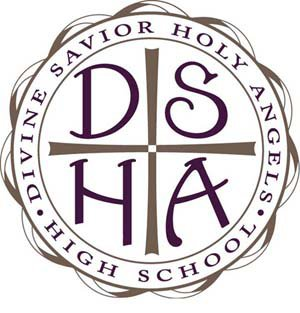

Location
- 4257 North 100th Street; Milwaukee, Milwaukee County, Wisconsin 53222-1391; United States; 43°5′40″N 88°2′21″W

Information
- Type: Private, All-Girls
- Motto: All girls makes all the difference.
- Religious affiliation: Roman Catholic
- Established: 1892 (Holy Angels), 1926 (Divine Savior)
- CEEB code: 501-350
- President: Katherine Konieczny
- Principal: Dan Quesnell
- Faculty: 61
- Grades: 9–12
- Gender: all female
- Average class size: 23
- Student to teacher ratio: 12:1
- Campus: suburban
- Campus size: 20 acres
- Colors: Red, gold and white
- Slogan: All Girls Makes All the Difference
- Athletics conference: Greater Metro Conference
- Sports: Basketball, Cross Country, Field Hockey, Golf, Gymnastics, Ice Hockey, Rugby, Skiing, Soccer, Softball, Swimming & Diving, Tennis, Track & Field; Volleyball
- Mascot: Penny the Dasher
- Team name: Dashers
- Accreditation: North Central Association of Colleges and Schools
- National ranking: 1. 1 Catholic high school in Wisconsin, #1 private high school for athletes in Wisconsin
- Newspaper: The Word
- Yearbook: Retrospect
- Tuition: 12,580
- Graduates: 100%
- Website: http://www.dsha.info

Divine Savior Holy Angels High School (DSHA) is an all-girls Roman Catholic high school in Milwaukee, Wisconsin. It is in the Roman Catholic Archdiocese of Milwaukee and sponsored by the Sisters of the Divine Savior.

== History ==
The school was created in 1970 with the affiliation of Divine Savior High School (DS) and Holy Angels Academy (HA). Divine Savior High School was established in 1926 by the Sisters of the Divine Savior (Salvatorians-SDS) as a convent school; it opened its doors to lay students in 1948. In 1951, DS moved to a new building near 100th Street and Capitol Drive. Holy Angels Academy (HA) was founded in 1892 by the Sisters of Charity of the Blessed Virgin Mary (BVMs) at 12th Street and Cedar Street (now Kilbourn Avenue) in Milwaukee.

In the years after its founding, HA continued to grow. In 1927 the BVMs dedicated an imposing new building on the school's original site. From its beginnings, HA established strong academic and religious education programs that included four years of English, Latin, science, history, and fine arts. Reflecting the times, emphasis was placed on teaching patriotism, social service, and a concern for the development of "womanliness" and the social graces. For example, in the World War I years, it was not unusual for HA students to raise money for Liberty Bonds and then on Saturdays learn to pour tea and do "lady-like" things like "china painting." As times changed, the HA curriculum expanded, as did the range of student activities. However, the Academy's core mission, reflecting the vision and example shared by the BVM order, its nineteen principals, staff, and alumnae over the years, was maintained until its closing.

Divine Savior High School, like HA, also expanded at its original site. Outgrowing its first location, the SDS sisters, led by their Superior General, Mother Olympia Heuel, first expanded the school at its North 36th Street location and then built a large, modern facility on 100th Street near Capitol Drive in Milwaukee. Sister Margaret (Charlene) Shekleton, the school's first principal at its new location, guided the transfer. Together with a group of dedicated SDS and lay instructors, she established a college preparatory program that also featured a wide range of extracurricular activities that included student government, forensics, debate, drama, journalism, and Sodality. Athletic programs were started in basketball and volleyball.

At both schools parental involvement was encouraged; each organized active advisory boards and home and school associations.

By the late 1960s, however, demographic, societal, and economic pressures led to the closing of many area schools, including most of Milwaukee's Catholic high schools. Both HA and DS were affected by these pressures, which raised serious doubts about their futures. Still, in the face of the conditions facing both schools connected with declining enrollment, the drop in the number of teaching sisters, and severe budget deficits, the two sponsoring religious orders, parents, students, and alumnae maintained their faith in continuing the mission of providing Catholic high school education for young women.

In 1970, and in the face of these realities, the religious sponsors and lay leaders of the two schools agreed to a proposed arrangement to join the schools together. The ensuing agreement meant the closing of HA. At the same time it offered the possibility of preserving the HA identity on the DS school site on 100th Street. No financial arrangements were made in the affiliation. What was understood was that in renaming the institution, Divine Savior Holy Angels High School and unifying the parents’ organizations, alumnae and school boards into one, the traditions of both schools would be preserved – with the sponsorship of the Sisters of the Divine Savior. Kenneth Grover was appointed the school's first principal.

Yet, even after the affiliation, the 1970s were difficult for the new DSHA high school. By then, the Sisters of the Divine Savior were finding it increasingly burdensome to continue their ownership of some of their institutions, which led to their closing. DSHA itself came under scrutiny as the question was raised over the sisters’ withdrawing from ownership of the school. In a word, "Should they seek out some group willing to purchase the school?" In 1975, a Salvatorian task force was established to confront this question. It recommended that a new try be made to continue the sisters’ commitment to DSHA, with the understanding that a new and successful effort be made.

In 1976, a DS alumna, Angela T. Pienkos, was named to the newly created position of chief administrator with a set of responsibilities that combined the duties of principal and those of leader of development. Working with a restructured and supportive Advisory Board, she energetically initiated the strengthening of educational programs and took on the task of putting the school on a solid financial footing.

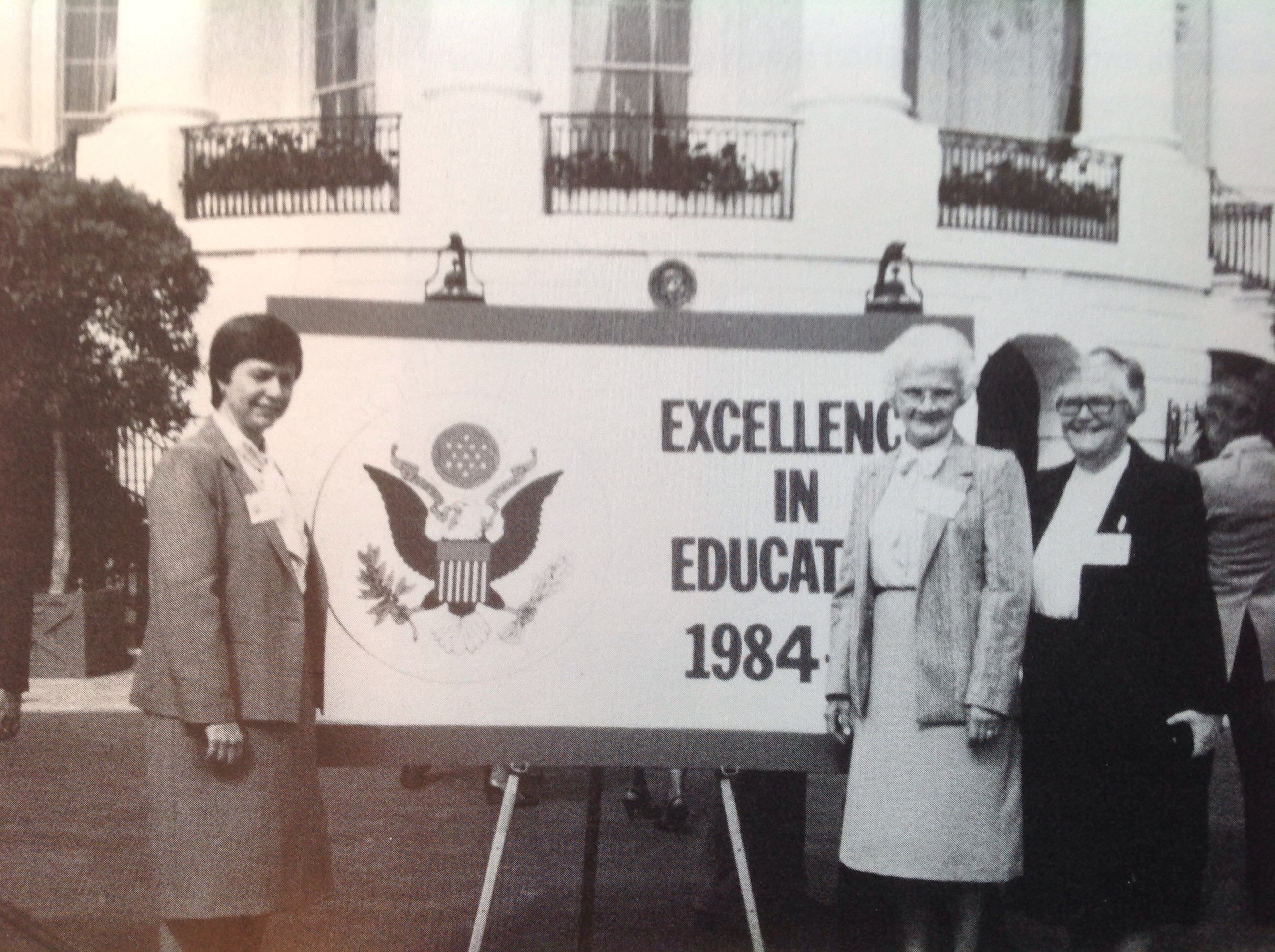
Exemplary Private School Award presentation for DSHA at the White House in 1984. Left to right, Dr. Angela T. Pienkos, S. Janet Schewe BVM, S. Maureen Hopkins SDS

Catholic high schools that were not faring so well included some single-gender high school institutions. One response to declining enrollment and financial problems was for all-boys schools, two of them in the Milwaukee area, to consider altering their mission and turning co-educational. One of them did so; soon after a neighboring and highly regarded all-girls high school went out of existence.

DSHA, too, was faced with this challenge when it was announced that the Jesuit-sponsored all-boys Marquette University High School of Milwaukee (MUHS) had begun an effort to gain support for its own move to becoming co-ed. This was a path other Jesuit high schools were taking around the country.

Recognizing the grave danger to DSHA and the diminution of the single-gender educational option (something that was gaining new recognition as a valuable type of educational experience), Pienkos organized a multi-faceted campaign that called on the MUHS school community to preserve MUHS as an all-boys school. Even DSHA's and MUHS’ student newspapers published surveys and editorials that opposed the idea.

Such efforts had a salutary effect. They led to MUHS’ decision to remain an all-boys school, an action that enabled both DSHA and MUHS to thrive into the 21st century – with both achieving capacity enrollments and offering Milwaukee area parents and students more high-quality Catholic, single-gender secondary school educational options.

In 1992 DSHA celebrated its centennial. The centennial events recalled the contributions of its founding religious sponsors, teachers, staff, and parents who had worked for and supported the school and its predecessors. At one of the centennial ceremonies a "Wall of Honor" was dedicated in honor and memory of the thousands of graduates of the school and its predecessor institutions.

With a large space of land and a need to expand and modernize, the 1990s also saw a continuing effort to update its facilities. Changes to the school have included construction of the Marie Esser Hansen (HA 1943) Library, a computer laboratory and business computer classroom in 1996, and the Rose A. Monaghan Science Center and lecture hall in 1998.

In 2003, the school was dramatically altered with the addition of the Robert and Marie Hansen Family Fine Arts Theatre, the Fridl Family Foyer, the Quad (a new cafeteria donated by Betty Quadracci), a new art suite, and new administrative areas. These physical changes were accompanied by a new strategic plan, revised mission and vision statements, a new logo, and new school uniforms.

In 2015, DSHA made another addition knocking down the original gymnasium, and building the Chris and John McDermott Gymnasium, the R. J. Fridl Commons, Sarah M. Hegarty Fitness Center, a new academic wing with a music suite, and the Mother of Our Savior Chapel with the DuBois Campus Ministry center. DSHA has completed this through the Building on our Faith campaign, as well as taken a new approach to the students' wellness.

== Demographics ==
In 2010-2011, the school enrolled 658 young women from the Milwaukee area and surrounding counties, drawing from over 115 parochial, private, and public schools throughout southeastern Wisconsin. Non-Catholic student enrollment was 10%. Student of color enrollment was 19%.

Financial aid and work study grants are available.

As of 2018, there were 687 girls enrolled, coming from over 116 parochial, private, and public schools. Around 25% of the student body identified themselves as students of color. Non-catholic enrollment was 17%.

== Academics ==
Divine Savior Holy Angels provides honors-level and advanced placement courses, as well as electives in visual arts, computer science, physical education, journalism, speech, music, dance, and theater arts. Languages offered are Spanish, French, and Latin. Students are required to complete theology courses all four years, plus overnight retreats and community service.

The Latin program placed third at the Wisconsin Junior Classical League's Latin Convention in 2005. After many years not attending Latin Convention, the program began to go again in 2017. Since then, they have placed first in the big schools category and brought the largest delegation in 2019.

== Extracurricular activities ==
DSHA performs a musical in the fall, a winter play, a spring play or showcase, and a community musical in the summer. The DSHA theater department also offers classes to students in performance, play-writing, and stagecraft for school credit.

The high school has a student council, a Model UN, forensics team, National Honor Society, foreign exchange programs, and culture and hobby-orientated clubs. The school's a monthly newspaper is The Word. It also has a literary magazine, an online magazine titled The Story, and an annual yearbook.

Volunteering in the community is required for students in all four years. There are a variety of service-oriented student clubs, such as the Campus Ministry Council. Students also must attend Mass once a month, and are required to attend retreats freshman and sophomore year.

The following sports are offered at DSHA: basketball, cross country, field hockey, golf, rugby, downhill ski racing, soccer, softball, swimming and diving, tennis, track and field, volleyball, ice hockey, and lacrosse. The DSHA rugby team has won the girls' regional tournament fourteen times, as of 2017. The team also won the girls' national competition in 2004, 2005, 2006, 2007, 2008, 2009, 2017, 2018, and 2019. The volleyball and basketball team won the 2015 Division 1 state championship.

=== Conference affiliation history ===
- Metro Conference (1974-1997)
- Greater Metro Conference (1997–present)

== Notable alumnae ==
- Chuti Tiu (1988), actress
- Rebecca Bradley (1989), Wisconsin Supreme Court justice
- Alyson Dudek (2008), speed skater and Olympic bronze medalist
- Arike Ogunbowale (2015), WNBA All-Star guard
- Jadin O'Brien (2020), track & field athlete
