= Kenny Brooks =

American basketball player and coach (born 1968)

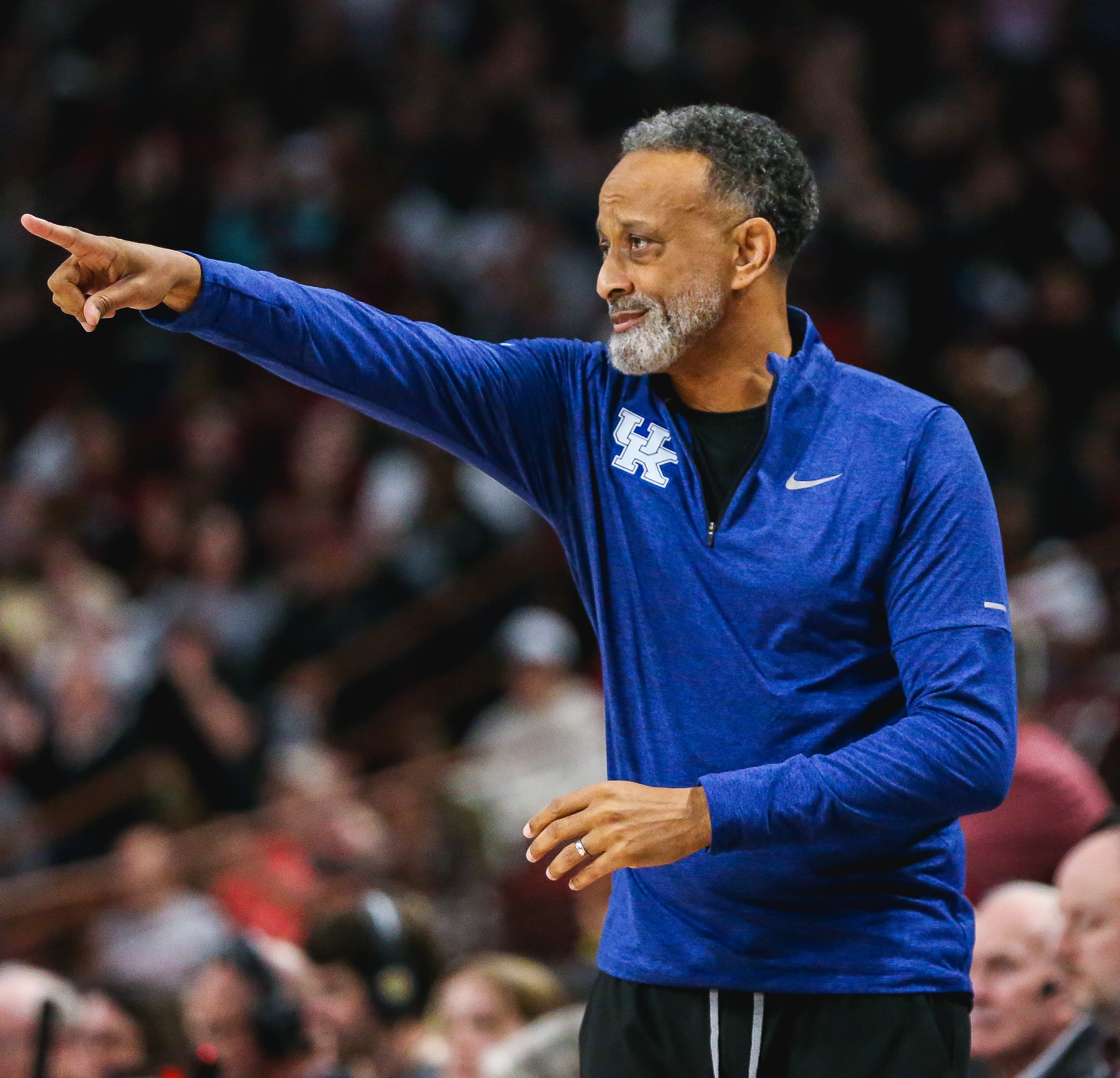
- Brooks with Kentucky in 2025

Current position
- Title: Head coach
- Team: Kentucky
- Conference: SEC
- Record: 48–19 (.716)

Biographical details
- Born: December 20, 1968 (age 57); Waynesboro, Virginia, U.S.

Playing career
- 1988–1991: James Madison

Coaching career (HC unless noted)
- 1994–1998: VMI (men's asst.)
- 1998–2002: James Madison (men's asst.)
- 2002–2003: James Madison (women's asst.)
- 2003–2016: James Madison
- 2016–2024: Virginia Tech
- 2024–present: Kentucky

Head coaching record
- Overall: 565–223 (.717)
- Tournaments: NCAA: 10–12; WNIT: 20–7

Accomplishments and honors

Championships
- NCAA regional champion – Final Four (2023); ACC tournament champion (2023); ACC regular season champion (2024); 5× CAA tournament champion (2010, 2011, 2014, 2015, 2016); 4× CAA regular season champion (2011, 2014, 2015, 2016)

Awards
- 2025 The Sporting News National Coach of the Year; 2022 JMU Athletics Hall of Fame; 4× CAA Coach of the Year (2007, 2014, 2015, 2016)

Records
- 500+ Career Wins; 220 CAA Victories (2nd all-time); 27 CAA Tournament Victories (2nd all-time)

Kenneth R. Brooks Jr. (born December 20, 1968) is an American college basketball coach who has been the head coach of the University of Kentucky women's basketball team since 2024. Previously, he was head coach at James Madison from 2003 to 2016 and Virginia Tech from 2016 to 2024.

== Career ==
Brooks played collegiate basketball at James Madison under coach Lefty Driesell.

After serving as the interim head coach for the 2002–03 season, Brooks was introduced as the James Madison University women's basketball head coach on March 21, 2003.

During the 2013–14 season, the James Madison University women's basketball team upset the 6-seed Gonzaga in the NCAA tournament. It was JMU's first NCAA tournament victory since 1991.

Brooks has the most regular season game victories in James Madison's women's basketball program history (337), having surpassed Shelia Moorman (302) in 2015. Brooks was the head coach when the James Madison University women's basketball team became the third school in NCAA women's basketball history to win 1,000 program games. He twice tied the school record for most wins in a single season with 29 (2011–12 and 2013–14).

On February 6, 2015, James Madison beat Hofstra University, (77–68), giving Brooks his 300th career win.

On March 28, 2016, Brooks accepted the position of head coach of the Virginia Tech Hokies women's basketball team. Brooks helped guide the program to many firsts, including the ACC tournament championship, the Sweet Sixteen, the Elite Eight, the Final Four, and a 30-win season all which were accomplished during the 2022–23 season. For the first time in program history, the Hokies won the ACC regular season title during the 2023–2024 season. He achieved his 500th career win as head coach while with the program.

On March 26, 2024, after eight seasons with Virginia Tech, Brooks resigned from his position and accepted a five-year, $7.7 million contract with Kentucky, making him the third highest paid women's basketball coach in the Southeastern Conference behind only LSU's Kim Mulkey and South Carolina's Dawn Staley.

=== Final Four ===
In 2023, Brooks achieved two college basketball coaching milestones. He coached his first team to a thirty-win season, and his team made it to the Final Four of the woman's basketball tournament. Virginia Tech won their first two games in the 2023 Women's NCAA Tournament by double digits, then faced Tennessee in the regional semifinal. The Hokies had 29 wins after the first two rounds of the tournament. The game against Tennessee started very well, with Virginia Tech achieving a 13 point lead (35 – 22) at halftime, then starting the second half with five straight points to open up an 18 point lead. Tennessee responded, cutting the lead to 9 points at the end of the third quarter and continued cutting into the lead, reducing the deficit to a single point at 53–52. The Hokies fought back and extended the lead to 11 points with just over two minutes remaining in the game. Virginia Tech ended up with the win, pushing their season win total to 30 wins for the first time in Brooks' career and resulting in the first time Virginia Tech has advanced to the elite eight game.

The elite eight game was against the Ohio State team that knocked UConn out of their quest for a 15th consecutive Final Four. Both teams led at times in the first half, with Virginia Tech clinging to a slim three point lead at halftime 48–45. Although Ohio State would cut the lead to a single point early in the third quarter, the Hokies never relinquished the lead and ended up with the win 84–74 to advance Brooks and Virginia Tech to their first ever Final Four.

== Head coaching record ==
Record table
Season	Team	Overall	Conference	Standing	Postseason
James Madison (Colonial Athletic Association) (2002–2016)
2002–03	James Madison	16–10	11–7	4th	
2003–04	James Madison	13–18	7–10	7th	
2004–05	James Madison	18–11	10–8	4th	
2005–06	James Madison	24–7	14–4	2nd	WNIT First Round
2006–07	James Madison	27–6	16–2	2nd	NCAA First Round
2007–08	James Madison	24–10	14–4	2nd	WNIT Quarterfinals
2008–09	James Madison	24–10	14–4	3rd	WNIT Second Round
2009–10	James Madison	26–7	13–5	2nd	NCAA First Round
2010–11	James Madison	26–8	16–2	1st	NCAA First Round
2011–12	James Madison	29–8	14–4	2nd	WNIT Runner-up
2012–13	James Madison	25–11	15–3	2nd	WNIT Quarterfinals
2013–14	James Madison	29–6	15–1	1st	NCAA Second Round
2014–15	James Madison	29–4	17–1	1st	NCAA First Round
2015–16	James Madison	27–6	17–1	1st	NCAA First Round
James Madison University:		337–122 (.734)	193–56 (.775)		
Virginia Tech (Atlantic Coast Conference) (2016–2024)
2016–17	Virginia Tech	20–14	4–12	T–11th	WNIT Quarterfinals
2017–18	Virginia Tech	23–14	6–10	T–9th	WNIT Runner-up
2018–19	Virginia Tech	22–12	6–10	10th	WNIT Third Round
2019–20	Virginia Tech	21–9	11–7	T–4th	Postseason cancelled
2020–21	Virginia Tech	15–10	8–8	7th	NCAA Second Round
2021–22	Virginia Tech	23–10	13–5	T–3rd	NCAA First Round
2022–23	Virginia Tech	31–5	14–4	T–2nd	NCAA Final Four
2023–24	Virginia Tech	25–8	14–4	1st	NCAA Second Round
Virginia Tech:		180–82 (.687)	76–60 (.559)		
Kentucky (SEC) (2024–present)
2024–25	Kentucky	23–8	11–5	T–4th	NCAA Second Round
2025–26	Kentucky	25–11	8–8	T–6th	NCAA Sweet Sixteen
Kentucky:		48–19 (.716)	19–13 (.594)		
Total:		565–223 (.717)			
National champion Postseason invitational champion Conference regular season champion Conference regular season and conference tournament champion Division regular season champion Division regular season and conference tournament champion Conference tournament champion
