= 2017–18 Mississippi State Bulldogs women's basketball team =

Intercollegiate basketball season

2017–18 Mississippi State Bulldogs women's basketball

SEC Regular Season Champions Cancún Challenge Mayan Division champions

NCAA tournament, Runner-Up
- Conference: Southeastern Conference

Ranking
- Coaches: No. 2
- AP: No. 4
- Record: 37–2 (16–0 SEC)
- Head coach: Vic Schaefer (6th season)
- Assistant coaches: Johnnie Harris; Dionnah Jackson-Durrett; Carly Thibault-DuDonis
- Home arena: Humphrey Coliseum

2017–18 SEC women's basketball standings
	Conf.				Overall
Team	W		L	PCT	W		L	PCT
No. 4 Mississippi State	16	–	0	1.000	37	–	2	.949
No. 7 South Carolina †	12	–	4	.750	29	–	7	.806
No. 18 Georgia	12	–	4	.750	26	–	7	.788
No. 12 Tennessee	11	–	5	.688	25	–	8	.758
No. 17 Missouri	11	–	5	.688	24	–	8	.750
No. 14 Texas A&M	11	–	5	.688	26	–	10	.722
No. 24 LSU	11	–	5	.688	19	–	10	.655
Alabama	7	–	9	.438	20	–	14	.588
Kentucky	6	–	10	.375	15	–	17	.469
Auburn	5	–	11	.313	14	–	15	.483
Arkansas	3	–	13	.188	13	–	18	.419
Florida	3	–	13	.188	11	–	19	.367
Vanderbilt	3	–	13	.188	7	–	24	.226
Ole Miss	1	–	15	.063	12	–	19	.387
† 2018 SEC tournament winner As of April 1, 2018; Rankings from AP poll

The 2017–18 Mississippi State Lady Bulldogs basketball team represented Mississippi State University during the 2017–18 NCAA Division I women's basketball season. The Lady Bulldogs, led by sixth-year head coach Vic Schaefer, played their home games at Humphrey Coliseum as members of the Southeastern Conference (SEC).

The Bulldogs were coming off a runner-up finish to fellow SEC team South Carolina in the NCAA tournament.

By beating Louisville 73-63 in overtime in the Final Four, Mississippi State played Notre Dame for the national championship; however, the Bulldogs were denied the title again, falling short 61–58 on a last-second three-pointer by Notre Dame's Arike Ogunbowale.

== Offseason ==
=== Departures ===
Name	Number	Pos.	Height	Year	Hometown	Notes
Dominique Dillingham	00	G	5'9"	Senior	Jackson, MS	Graduated
Breanna Richardson	3	F	6'1"	Senior	Conyers, GA	Graduated
Ketara Chapel	13	F	6'1"	Senior	Temple, TX	Graduated
Chinwe Okorie	45	C	6'5"	Senior	Lagos, Nigeria	Graduated

== Roster ==
2017–18 Mississippi State Bulldogs women's basketball team
Players
Coaches

Pos.	#	Name	Height	Year	Previous school	Hometown
G	1	Blair Schaefer	5 ft 7 in (1.7 m)	Sr	Starkville HS	Starkville, MS
G	2	Morgan William	5 ft 5 in (1.65 m)	Sr	Shades Valley HS	Birmingham, AL
G	3	Myah Taylor (redshirt)	5 ft 7 in (1.7 m)	Fr	Olive Branch HS	Olive Branch, MS
G	10	Jazzmun Holmes	5 ft 8 in (1.73 m)	Jr	Harrison Central HS	Gulfport, MS
G	11	Roshunda Johnson	5 ft 7 in (1.7 m)	RS Sr	Parkview Arts & Science; Oklahoma State	Little Rock, AR
G	12	Jacaira Allen	5 ft 10 in (1.78 m)	So	Dillard HS	Pompano Beach, FL
C	15	Teaira McCowan	6 ft 7 in (2.01 m)	Jr	Brenham HS	Brenham, TX
G	20	Nyah Tate	6 ft 0 in (1.83 m)	Fr	Terry HS	Terry, MS
F	21	Jonika Garvin	6 ft 0 in (1.83 m)	Jr	Lake Worth Community HS; Palm Beach State CC	Lake Worth, FL
G	23	Bre'Amber Scott	5 ft 11 in (1.8 m)	Fr	Central HS	Little Rock, AR
G	24	Jordan Danberry	5 ft 8 in (1.73 m)	Jr	Conway HS; Arkansas	Conway, AR
C	25	Zion Campbell	6 ft 3 in (1.91 m)	RS So	Riverdale Baptist School	Washington, DC
F	35	Victoria Vivians	6 ft 1 in (1.85 m)	Sr	Scott Central HS	Forest, MS
F	55	Chloe Bibby	6 ft 1 in (1.85 m)	Fr	Rowville Secondary	Warracknabeal, Vic, Australia

Head coach

- Vic Schaefer (Texas A&M)

Assistant coach(es)

- Johnnie Harris (Arkansas Baptist)
- Dionnah Jackson-Durrett (Oklahoma)
- Carly Thibault-DuDonis (Monmouth)

Legend

- (C) Team captain
- (S) Suspended
- (I) Ineligible
- (W) Walk-on
- Injured
- Current redshirt

Roster
Last update: November 30, 2017

== Schedule ==
Date time, TV	Rank^{#}	Opponent^{#}	Result	Record	Site (attendance) city, state
Exhibition
11/03/2017*; 6:00 pm	No. 7	Arkansas–Fort Smith	W 100–67		Humphrey Coliseum (1,850); Starkville, MS
Non-conference regular season
11/10/2017*; 8:00 pm	No. 7	Virginia	W 68–53	1–0	Humphrey Coliseum (6,811); Starkville, MS
11/16/2017*; 7:00 pm	No. 7	Georgia State	W 106–50	2–0	Humphrey Coliseum (4,584); Starkville, MS
11/19/2017*; 2:00 pm	No. 7	Southern Miss	W 91–56	3–0	Humphrey Coliseum (5,321); Starkville, MS
11/23/2017*; 1:30 pm	No. 7	vs. No. 24 Arizona State; Cancún Challenge Mayan Division	W 65–57	4–0	Hard Rock Hotel Riviera Maya (982); Cancún, Mexico
11/24/2017*; 10:00 am	No. 7	vs. Columbia; Cancún Challenge Mayan Division	W 90–54	5–0	Hard Rock Hotel Riviera Maya; Cancún, Mexico
11/25/2017*; 11:00 am	No. 7	vs. Green Bay; Cancún Challenge Mayan Division	W 67–46	6–0	Hard Rock Hotel Riviera Maya (982); Cancún, Mexico
11/29/2017*; 7:00 pm	No. 6	vs. Louisiana; Jackson Showcase	W 94–37	7–0	Mississippi Coliseum (3,578); Jackson, MS
12/03/2017*; 1:00 pm, SECN	No. 6	Oklahoma State; Big 12/SEC Women's Challenge	W 79–76	8–0	Humphrey Coliseum (5,138); Starkville, MS
12/10/2017*; 2:00 pm	No. 6	Little Rock	W 86–48	9–0	Humphrey Coliseum (5,010); Starkville, MS
12/13/2017*; 6:00 pm, SECN	No. 5	No. 9 Oregon	W 90–79	10–0	Humphrey Coliseum (5,445); Starkville, MS
12/17/2017*; 2:00 pm	No. 5	Maine	W 83–43	11–0	Humphrey Coliseum (4,953); Starkville, MS
12/20/2017*; 4:30 pm	No. 5	at UNLV; Duel in the Desert, Rebel Division	W 103–63	12–0	Cox Pavilion; Paradise, NV
12/21/2017*; 4:30 pm	No. 5	vs. Syracuse; Duel in the Desert, Rebel Division	W 76–65	13–0	Cox Pavilion; Paradise, NV
12/28/2017*; 7:00 pm	No. 5	Mississippi Valley State	W 112–36	14–0	Humphrey Coliseum (8,535); Starkville, MS
SEC regular season
12/31/2017; 5:00 pm, SECN	No. 5	at Georgia	W 86–62	15–0 (1–0)	Stegeman Coliseum (2,934); Athens, GA
01/04/2018; 8:00 pm, SECN	No. 5	Arkansas	W 111–69	16–0 (2–0)	Humphrey Coliseum (5,398); Starkville, MS
01/07/2018; 1:00 pm, SECN	No. 5	at LSU	W 83–70	17–0 (3–0)	Pete Maravich Assembly Center (2,525); Baton Rouge, LA
01/11/2018; 8:00 pm, SECN	No. 4	Ole Miss	W 76–45	18–0 (4–0)	Humphrey Coliseum (7,161); Starkville, MS
01/14/2018; 3:00 pm, ESPNU	No. 4	Alabama	W 75–61	19–0 (5–0)	Humphrey Coliseum (9,010); Starkville, MS
01/21/2018; 2:00 pm, ESPN2	No. 3	at No. 6 Tennessee	W 71–52	20–0 (6–0)	Thompson–Boling Arena (13,436); Knoxville, TN
01/25/2018; 7:30 pm, SECN	No. 2	Florida	W 90–53	21–0 (7–0)	Humphrey Coliseum (6,727); Starkville, MS
01/28/2018; 1:00 pm, ESPNU	No. 2	at Ole Miss	W 69–49	22–0 (8–0)	The Pavilion at Ole Miss (5,158); Oxford, MS
02/01/2018; 7:30 pm, SECN	No. 2	at No. 15 Missouri	W 57–53	23–0 (9–0)	Mizzou Arena (5,095); Columbia, MO
02/05/2018; 6:00 pm, ESPN2	No. 2	No. 7 South Carolina	W 67–53	24–0 (10–0)	Humphrey Coliseum (10,794); Starkville, MS
02/08/2018; 6:00 pm	No. 2	at Florida	W 98–50	25–0 (11–0)	O'Connell Center (1,503); Gainesville, FL
02/11/2018; 1:00 pm, ESPNU	No. 2	Kentucky	W 74–55	26–0 (12–0)	Humphrey Coliseum (9,520); Starkville, MS
02/15/2018; 7:30 pm, SECN	No. 2	at Vanderbilt	W 95–50	27–0 (13–0)	Memorial Gymnasium (2,876); Nashville, TN
02/18/2018; 4:00 pm, ESPN2	No. 2	No. 17 Texas A&M	W 76–55	28–0 (14–0)	Humphrey Coliseum (9,933); Starkville, MS
02/22/2018; 7:00 pm	No. 2	Auburn	W 82–61	29–0 (15–0)	Humphrey Coliseum (9,474); Starkville, MS
02/25/2018; 11:00 am, ESPNU	No. 2	at Kentucky	W 85–63	30–0 (16–0)	Memorial Coliseum (6,014); Lexington, KY
SEC Women's Tournament
03/02/2018; 12:00 pm, SECN	(1) No. 2	vs. (9) Kentucky; Quarterfinals	W 81–58	31–0	Bridgestone Arena (6,344); Nashville, TN
03/03/2018; 4:00 pm, ESPNU	(1) No. 2	vs. (5) No. 15 Texas A&M; Semifinals	W 70–55	32–0	Bridgestone Arena (8,819); Nashville, TN
03/04/2018; 3:30 pm, ESPN2	(1) No. 2	vs. (2) No. 8 South Carolina; Championship	L 51–62	32–1	Bridgestone Arena (8,215); Nashville, TN
NCAA Women's Tournament
03/17/2018*; 5:00 pm, ESPN2	(1 KC) No. 4	(16 KC) Nicholls State; First Round	W 95–50	33–1	Humphrey Coliseum (10,211); Starkville, MS
03/19/2018*; 8:00 pm, ESPN2	(1 KC) No. 4	(9 KC) Oklahoma State; Second Round	W 71–56	34–1	Humphrey Coliseum (9,881); Starkville, MS
03/23/2018*; 6:00 pm, ESPN2	(1 KC) No. 4	vs. (4 KC) No. 21 NC State; Sweet Sixteen	W 71–57	35–1	Sprint Center; Kansas City, MO
03/25/2018*; 6:30 pm, ESPN	(1 KC) No. 4	vs. (3 KC) No. 9 UCLA; Elite Eight	W 89–73	36–1	Sprint Center (4,089); Kansas City, MO
03/30/2018*; 6:00 pm, ESPN2	(1 KC) No. 4	vs. (1 L) No. 3 Louisville; Final Four	W 73–63 ^{OT}	37–1	Nationwide Arena (19,564); Columbus, OH
04/01/2018*; 5:00 pm, ESPN	(1 KC) No. 4	vs. (1 S) No. 3 Notre Dame; Championship Game	L 58–61	37–2	Nationwide Arena (19,599); Columbus, OH
*Non-conference game. ^{#}Rankings from AP Poll. (#) Tournament seedings in parentheses. KC=Kansas City Region. All times are in Central Time.

== Rankings ==
Ranking movements Legend: ██ Increase in ranking ██ Decrease in ranking
	Week																			
Poll	Pre	1	2	3	4	5	6	7	8	9	10	11	12	13	14	15	16	17	18	Final
AP	7	7	7	6	6	5	5	5	5	4	3	2	2	2	2	2	2	4	4	Not released
Coaches	4	3^	3	3	3	3	3	3	3	3	3	2	2	2	2	2	2	4	4	2

^Coaches' Poll did not release a second poll at the same time as the AP.

== See also ==
- 2017–18 Mississippi State Bulldogs men's basketball team
