= Milan Bolden-Morris =

Basketball player and football coach

Personal information
- Born: Belle Glade, Florida
- Listed height: 5 ft 10 in (1.78 m)

Career information
- High school: Cardinal Newman (West Palm Beach, Florida)
- College: Boston College (2017–2020); Georgetown (2020–2022)
- Position: Guard

Career highlights
- ACC All-Freshman Team (2018)

Milan "Mimi" Bolden-Morris is a former basketball player for the Boston College Eagles and Georgetown Hoyas, and a former graduate assistant football coach for the Michigan Wolverines.

== Early life and education ==
Bolden-Morris is from Belle Glade, Florida, and attended Cardinal Newman High School. Bolden-Morris's father, Michael, is a policeman and her mother, Melanie, is a high school principal. In high school, she was the president of her school's National Honor Society.

Growing up, she played baseball, softball, and flag football.

In April 2017, as a senior in high school, she wore a prom dress printed with faces from the Black Lives Matter movement, including Sandra Bland, Trayvon Martin, Tamir Rice, and Michael Brown. The dress was designed by Terrence Torrence.

== College ==
Bolden-Morris attended Boston College for three and a half years, where she played basketball and earned a bachelor's degree in communication.

She then spent a year and a half at Georgetown University, where she continued to play basketball in the latter half of the 2020-2021 season and the entire 2021-2022 season. As a guard, she led the Georgetown women's basketball team in scoring with 12.6 points per game, and made 83 three-point shots. At Georgetown, she won the Most Outstanding Student Award.

She earned a master's degree from Georgetown in sports industry management. At the University of Michigan, she is pursuing a second master's degree, in public policy.

== Coaching career ==
In March 2022, the Michigan Wolverines football team hired Bolden-Morris as a graduate assistant coach who would work with quarterbacks. Michigan football coach Jim Harbaugh reportedly described Bolden-Morris as a “bright, intelligent and competitive young woman who will be a great addition to our program and offensive coaching staff," and noted that he has "always believed in providing opportunities for individuals who are passionate about football, and Mimi is someone who has shown that drive to become a football coach." She started the job in June 2022.

On her hiring, Bolden-Morris said, "The opportunity to be the first female GA in the Power Five, especially the Big Ten, is an absolute honor. It speaks volumes to the efforts that Coach Harbaugh has made to create an environment of inclusion. These opportunities have been an anomaly for a black woman until recently. Growing up watching my dad coach my brother, it has always been my dream to be a part of a football team in some form, so this opportunity is allowing me to live out a dream of mine, especially working with quarterbacks. Coming from the basketball world, guards and quarterbacks are one and the same. Both have the ability to make decisions under duress, read defenses, take care of the ball, and execute with precision and accuracy."

Bolden-Morris's first game as an assistant was when Michigan beat the Colorado State Rams (51-7) on September 3, 2022.

Her younger brother, Mike Morris, is a senior defensive end on the 2022 team.

Per the Associated Press, Bolden-Morris is believed to be the first female graduate assistant football coach at a Power Five school since Carol White worked as a kicking assistant at Georgia Tech in the 1980s, and the first ever in the Big Ten.

== Career statistics ==
Legend
GP	Games played	GS	Games started	MPG	Minutes per game	RPG	Rebounds per game
APG	Assists per game	SPG	Steals per game	BPG	Blocks per game	PPG	Points per game
TO	Turnovers per game	FG%	Field-goal percentage	3P%	3-point field-goal percentage	FT%	Free-throw percentage
**Bold**	Career best	°	League leader

=== College ===
Year	Team	GP	GS	MPG	FG%	3P%	FT%	RPG	APG	SPG	BPG	TO	PPG
2017–18	Boston College	**30**	27	35.0	**37.9**	35.6	66.7	**4.5**	**1.2**	0.8	0.0	2.2	12.0
2018–19	Boston College	**30**	0	16.4	34.2	31.4	66.7	1.6	0.7	0.4	0.1	**0.5**	5.1
2019–20	Boston College	25	4	14.6	36.8	33.8	53.8	1.9	0.8	0.4	0.1	1.0	5.0
2020–21	Georgetown	15	13	31.9	32.3	22.6	62.5	3.4	0.6	0.7	**0.5**	1.9	9.5
2021–22	Georgetown	29	**29**	**35.2**	33.3	**35.8**	**78.3**	4.2	1.0	**0.9**	0.1	2.2	**12.6**
**Career**		129	73	26.4	35.0	33.0	69.0	3.1	0.9	0.7	0.1	1.6	8.9
Statistics retrieved from Sports-Reference.
