= Arike Ogunbowale =

American basketball player (born 1997)

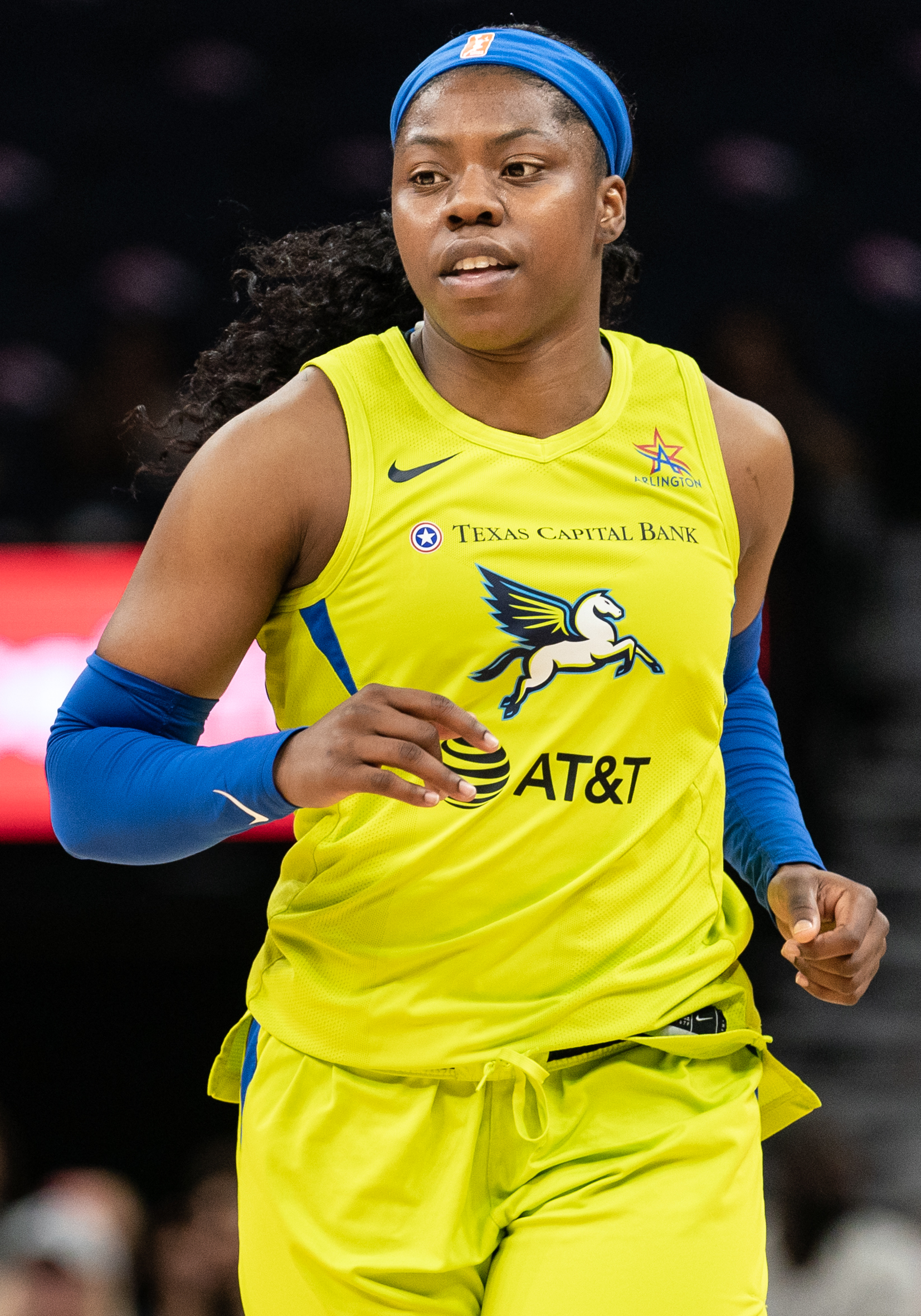
- Ogunbowale in 2019

No. 24 – Dallas Wings
- Position: Point guard / Shooting guard
- League: WNBA

Personal information
- Born: March 2, 1997 (age 29) Milwaukee, Wisconsin, U.S.
- Listed height: 5 ft 8 in (1.73 m)
- Listed weight: 165 lb (75 kg)

Career information
- High school: Divine Savior Holy Angels (Milwaukee, Wisconsin)
- College: Notre Dame (2015–2019)
- WNBA draft: 2019: 1st round, 5th overall pick
- Drafted by: Dallas Wings
- Playing career: 2019–present

Career history
- 2019–present: Dallas Wings
- 2019–2020: OGM Ormanspor
- 2020–2022: Dynamo Kursk
- 2025: Vinyl BC
- 2026–present: Mist BC
- 2026: Sichuan Yuanda

Career highlights
- 4× WNBA All-Star (2021-2024); 2× WNBA All-Star Game MVP (2021, 2024); All-WNBA First Team (2020); 2x All-WNBA Second Team (2021, 2024); WNBA All-Rookie Team (2019); WNBA scoring champion (2020); WNBA steals leader (2024); Unrivaled champion (2026); WCBA champion (2026); NCAA champion (2018); NCAA Tournament MOP (2018); 2x Second-team All-American – AP (2018, 2019); 2x WBCA Coaches' All-American (2018, 2019); First-team All-American – USBWA (2019); All-American – USBWA (2018); ACC Female Athlete of the Year (2018); 2x First-team All-ACC (2018, 2019); ACC All-Freshman Team (2016); McDonald's All-American (2015); Wisconsin Miss Basketball (2015)
- Stats at WNBA.com
- Stats at Basketball Reference
Medals
Women's basketball
Representing the United States
FIBA AmeriCup
Gold medal – first place	2019 Puerto Rico	Team
FIBA Under-17 World Cup
Gold medal – first place	2014 Czech Republic	Team
FIBA Americas Under-16 Championship
Gold medal – first place	2013 Mexico	Team
Women's 3x3 basketball
Representing the United States
FIBA 3x3 Under-18 World Cup
Silver medal – second place	2015 Hungary	Team
Youth Olympic Games
Gold medal – first place	2014 China	Team
FIBA 3x3 Under-18 World Cup
Gold medal – first place	2013 Indonesia	Team

Arike Faulina “Goomba” Ogunbowale (born March 2, 1997) is a Nigerian-American professional basketball player for the Dallas Wings of the Women's National Basketball Association (WNBA) and for the Mist of Unrivaled. She played college basketball for the Notre Dame Fighting Irish, before being drafted by the Wings with the fifth overall pick of the 2019 WNBA draft. She was the Most Outstanding Player of Notre Dame's 2018 national title run, hitting game-winning baskets in both the semi-final and championship game. Arike Ogunbowale was named WNBA All Star MVP in 2021 and 2024.

== Early life ==
She was born to parents Yolanda Block Ogunbowale and Nigerian expat Gregory Ogunbowale in Milwaukee. She is the youngest of three children. She is of Yoruba descent and her name "Arike" means "a child you treasure, cherish, pamper and love" in the Yoruba language. Her father served in the Nigerian military while her mother Yolanda played softball at DePaul University and her brother Dare played football at the University of Wisconsin and is a running back for the Las Vegas Raiders. She is also a cousin of basketball player Diamond Stone. From 2009 to 2012, Ogunbowale was part of four Division One Wisconsin State High School Champions soccer teams.

Ogunbowale came out of the eighth grade at Our Redeemer Lutheran School in Wauwatosa, Wisconsin. In her last year at Our Redeemer, Arike helped the Our Redeemer girls' team win the national championship at the 2011 Tournament of Champions sponsored by the Lutheran Basketball Association of America. She was named the MVP of the tournament.

== High school ==
In high school, she also played as a soccer forward, but decided to focus on basketball after coming to enjoy the sport more.

She went on to play high school basketball at Divine Savior Holy Angels High School (DSHA) in Milwaukee, Wisconsin. DSHA has long been known for its multiple national and state titles in numerous sports. Ogunbowale returned to DSHA on December 30, 2021, to be inducted into the Hall of Fame there. In the 2014–2015 season, the team won the Wisconsin Interscholastic Athletic Association Division I title, with Ogunbowale averaging 27.2 points per game. She scored 55 points in a semi-final game against an undefeated team. Ogunbowale was ranked ninth in the world, named 2015 Wisconsin Miss Basketball and was a McDonald's High School All-America selection.

== College career ==
Ogunbowale averaged 11.4 points per game in her freshman season at Notre Dame as a reserve player, and became a regular starter the next year.

In her junior season, Ogunbowale helped the Fighting Irish win the 2018 NCAA Division I women's basketball tournament, making game-winning baskets in the semifinal against UConn and in the final against Mississippi State. Shortly after the end of the 2017–18 school year, the Atlantic Coast Conference named her as its female Athlete of the Year across all sports, sharing honors with men's winner Lamar Jackson of Louisville football.

In her next and final season at Notre Dame, she again helped them to the final of the NCAA tournament but this time, despite contributing 31 points through that match and a tournament average of 22.8 points, she missed 1 of 2 free throws in the final seconds against Baylor, with her miss providing the final 1-point margin.

== Professional career ==
=== WNBA ===
Ogunbowale entered the WNBA league in 2019 when she was the fifth overall pick in the 2019 WNBA draft by the Dallas Wings.

Ogunbowale was selected as the WNBA 2021 All-Star Game Most Valuable Player (MVP) with 26 points in the team WNBA win versus the women's Olympic squad, Team USA (July 14, 2021). During the 2019 season, she was third in the league in scoring, averaging 19.1 points per game. She scored 20 or more points in 13 of her final 14 games, including the final 11 of the season. After the season, Ogunbowale was named to the All-Rookie Team.

In May 2023 she was named the WNBA's Western Conference Player of the Month. Leading up to the May award, in the first week of the season from May 20 to May 28, Ogunbowale averaged a league-high 26.7 points, giving Dallas its first 2–0 season start since 2007. Over four games in May, she ranked third in scoring in the WNBA. In a game where she scored 21 points against Minnesota, she became the 11th player in league history to score over 20 points in the first four games of the season.

While playing with the Wings early on, in the winter she played overseas in Turkey and then Russia. She coached at the 2022 NBA Academy Women's Camp during an offseason trip to Saly, Senegal. Also, she played during the NBA Celebrity All-Star Game in Utah. Near the end of the 2022 regular season, she suffered an oblique injury and stayed home for the offseason instead of playing overseas, accepting a player marketing agreement from the WNBA. She didn't play for two months.

In May 2023, after a win over the Atlanta Dream, the Dallas Morning News called her the "cornerstone" of the team. In June 2023, her parents praised the debut of WNBA shows being aired on national television, allowing her games to be seen outside of arenas. In 2023, early that year, she appeared in several State Farm ads. She led the Dallas Wings to a second win over Mercury in front of a sellout crowd in June 2023, scoring a season-high of 35 points for the Wings in a 90–77 win. She sank 12 of 21 shots with five assists.

On July 20, 2024, Ogunbowale was named the WNBA All Star Game MVP after scoring 34 points (a WNBA All-Star Game record) with 6 assists—all in the second half. This was the 2nd All-Star MVP title for Ogunbowale, who also won the title in 2021. In both cases, the WNBA All-Stars were playing against Team USA Olympic teams.

On April 10, 2026, Ogunbowale re-signed with the Wings on a seven-figure, multiyear contract.

=== Unrivaled ===
On July 12, 2024, it was announced that Ogunbowale would appear and play in the inaugural season of Unrivaled, a new women's 3-on-3 basketball league founded by Napheesa Collier and Breanna Stewart. In the 2025 Unrivaled season she played for Vinyl BC. In the 1v1 tournament of Unrivaled she finished as a semi-finalist, losing to eventual runner-up Aaliyah Edwards.

On November 5, 2025, it was announced that Ogunbowale had been drafted by Mist BC for the 2026 Unrivaled season.

== Career statistics ==
Legend
GP	Games played	GS	Games started	MPG	Minutes per game	RPG	Rebounds per game
APG	Assists per game	SPG	Steals per game	BPG	Blocks per game	PPG	Points per game
TO	Turnovers per game	FG%	Field-goal percentage	3P%	3-point field-goal percentage	FT%	Free-throw percentage
**Bold**	Career best	°	League leader

*	Denotes season(s) in which Ogunbowale won an NCAA Championship

=== WNBA ===
==== Regular season ====
Stats current through end of 2025 season

WNBA regular season statistics
Year	Team	GP	GS	MPG	FG%	3P%	FT%	RPG	APG	SPG	BPG	TO	PPG
2019	Dallas	33	28	32.1	.388	.352	.815	2.4	3.2	1.1	0.0	2.1	19.1
2020	Dallas	22°	22°	34.0	**.412**	.336	.856	2.8	3.4	1.6	0.0	2.1	**22.8**°
2021	Dallas	32	32	31.3	.383	**.376**	.864	3.2	3.3	1.1	0.0	2.1	18.7
2022	Dallas	30	30	31.4	.400	.352	.798	3.3	3.6	1.5	0.1	**1.8**	19.7
2023	Dallas	**40**	**40**	37.2°	.398	.343	.876	3.4	4.5	1.7	0.1	2.6	21.2
2024	Dallas	38	38	**38.6**°	.383	.346	.921°	**4.6**	**5.1**	**2.1**°	**0.3**	2.7	22.2
2025	Dallas	29	29	33.3	.364	.304	**.931**	2.5	4.1	1.3	0.2	2.1	15.5
**Career**	7 years, 1 team	224	219	34.3	.390	.346	.866	3.2	4.0	1.5	0.1	2.2	19.9
**Career**	All-Star	4	3	25.7	.416	.391	.875	3.8	3.8	1.5	0.0	0.8	22.3

==== Playoffs ====
WNBA playoff statistics
Year	Team	GP	GS	MPG	FG%	3P%	FT%	RPG	APG	SPG	BPG	TO	PPG
2021	Dallas	1	1	35.0	**.500**	**.500**	.500	2.0	2.0	1.0	0.0	1.0	**22.0**
2022	Dallas	1	0	6.0	.000	.000	–	0.0	0.0	0.0	0.0	**0.0**	0.0
2023	Dallas	**5**	**5**	**37.8**	.388	.351	**.643**	**4.8**	**5.2**	**1.6**	0.0	1.4	19.6
**Career**	3 years, 1 team	7	6	32.9	.393	.367	.625	3.7	4.0	1.3	0.0	1.1	17.1

=== College ===
NCAA statistics
Year	Team	GP	GS	MPG	FG%	3P%	FT%	RPG	APG	SPG	BPG	TO	PPG
2015–16	Notre Dame	35	0	19.3	.433	.391	.718	3.4	1.2	0.6	0.1	2.0	11.4
2016–17	Notre Dame	37	26	29.4	**.449**	**.454**	.732	4.8	1.9	1.2	**0.2**	1.5	15.9
2017–18*	Notre Dame	38	38	**34.3**	.443	.382	.796	**5.4**	2.8	1.4	0.1	**1.4**	20.8°
2018–19	Notre Dame	**39**	**39**	32.7	.456	.359	**.804**	4.9	**3.8**	**1.9**	0.1	2.0	**21.8**°
**Career**		149	113	29.2	.444	.393	.770	4.6	2.4	1.3	0.1	1.7	17.6

== Personal life ==
In April 2018, Ogunbowale was announced as one of the celebrities who would compete on season 26 of Dancing with the Stars. She was partnered with professional dancer, Gleb Savchenko. Ogunbowale and Savchenko were eliminated from the competition on May 7, 2018, placing 7th.

On May 19, 2024, Arike announced her engagement to Lala Ronay. The couple married on February 24, 2026.

Arike's older brother, Dare, is a professional football player in the NFL.

On March 5, 2026, Ogunbowale was arrested for misdemeanor battery for punching a man in the face at a Miami nightclub. She was out celebrating winning the Unrivaled championship. The charges were dropped in May of 2026.
