= 2017–18 Cal State Northridge Matadors women's basketball team =

Intercollegiate basketball season

2017–18 Cal State Northridge Matadors women's basketball
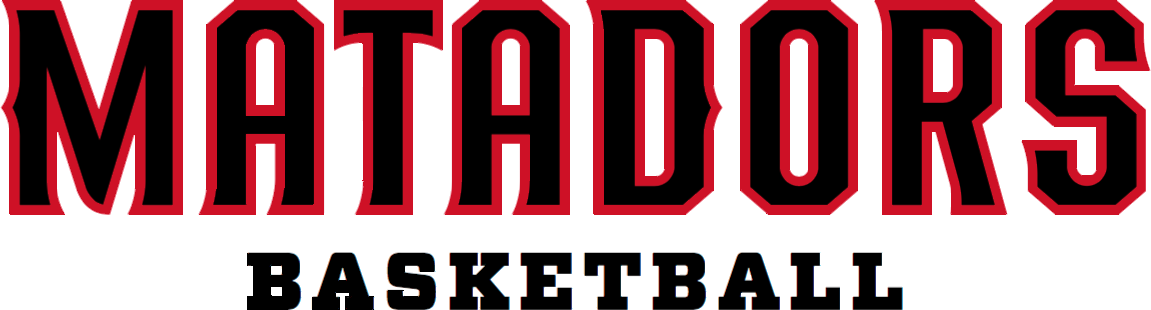

Big West tournament champions

NCAA women's tournament, first round
- Conference: Big West Conference
- Record: 19–16 (8–8 Big West)
- Head coach: Jason Flowers (8th season)
- Assistant coaches: Lindsey Foster; Brandy Manning; Ashlee Guay
- Home arena: Matadome

2017–18 Big West women's basketball standings
	Conf.				Overall
Team	W		L	PCT	W		L	PCT
UC Davis	14	–	2	.875	28	–	7	.800
Cal Poly	11	–	5	.688	17	–	12	.586
UC Irvine	10	–	6	.625	18	–	13	.581
UC Santa Barbara	9	–	7	.563	12	–	17	.414
Cal State Northridge †	8	–	8	.500	19	–	16	.543
UC Riverside	6	–	10	.375	11	–	22	.333
Long Beach State	6	–	10	.375	8	–	23	.258
Hawaii	5	–	11	.313	12	–	18	.400
Cal State Fullerton	3	–	13	.188	8	–	21	.276
† 2018 Big West tournament winner As of 25 March 2018; Rankings from AP poll

The 2017–18 Cal State Northridge Matadors women's basketball team represented California State University, Northridge during the 2017–18 NCAA Division I women's basketball season. The Matadors, led by eighth-year head coach Jason Flowers, played their home games at the Matadome as members of the Big West Conference. They finished the season 19–16, 8–8 in Big West play, to finish in fifth place. They won the Big West women's tournament to earn an automatic bid to the NCAA women's tournament where they lost to Notre Dame in the first round.

== Roster ==
2017–18 Cal State Northridge Matadors women's basketball team
Players
Coaches

Pos.	#	Name	Height	Year	Previous school	Hometown
G	0	Terrin Sullivan	5 ft 8 in (1.73 m)	So	Middle College	Los Angeles, CA
G	2	Destiny Brooks	5 ft 7 in (1.7 m)	Fr	Gilmer	Gilmer, TX
G	3	Serafina Maulupe	5 ft 8 in (1.73 m)	RS Sr	Vista Murrieta; Virginia Tech	Murrieta, CA
F	10	Tessa Boagni	6 ft 2 in (1.88 m)	Sr	Christchurch Girls'	Christchurch, New Zealand
F	11	Juliana Louis	6 ft 1 in (1.85 m)	Fr	St. Anthony's	Long Beach, CA
G	12	Meghann Henderson	5 ft 10 in (1.78 m)	Fr	Sonora	La Habra, CA
F	14	Taylor Nate	6 ft 0 in (1.83 m)	Sr	Rocky Mountain	Meridian, ID
G	15	Claudia Ramos	6 ft 0 in (1.83 m)	Jr	Tecnológico de Monterrey	Zapopan, Mexico
F	22	Jordan Smith	6 ft 3 in (1.91 m)	Sr	Woodcroft College; Casper College	Adelaide, Australia
G	23	Hayley Tanabe	5 ft 4 in (1.63 m)	So	West Torrance	Torrance, CA
G	24	Cheyenne Allen	5 ft 10 in (1.78 m)	Jr	St. Anthony's	Lakewood, CA
C	33	Channon Fluker	6 ft 4 in (1.93 m)	Jr	Maranatha	Pasadena, CA
C	44	Lauren Shymkewicz	6 ft 3 in (1.91 m)	So	Ralston	Omaha, NE
F	52	Eliza Matthews	6 ft 1 in (1.85 m)	So	Long Beach Poly	Long Beach, CA
F	55	De'Jionae Calloway (redshirt)	6 ft 0 in (1.83 m)	Jr	Lee's Summit West; Texas State	Lee's Summit, MO

Head coach

- Jason Flowers (UCLA)

Assistant coach(es)

- Lindsey Foster (Northern Arizona)
- Brandy Manning (Clark Atlanta)
- Ashlee Guay (Cal State Northridge)

Legend

- (C) Team captain
- (S) Suspended
- (I) Ineligible
- (W) Walk-on
- Injured
- Current redshirt

Roster
Last update: July 8, 2024

== Schedule and results ==
Date time, TV	Rank^{#}	Opponent^{#}	Result	Record	Site (attendance) city, state
Exhibition
10/28/2017*; 3:00 p.m.		The Master's	W 83–55		Matadome; Northridge, CA
Non-conference regular season
11/10/2017*; 5:00 p.m.		at No. 11 Oregon; Preseason WNIT first round	L 43–91	0–1	Matthew Knight Arena (2,646); Eugene, OR
11/14/2017*; 6:30 p.m.		at San Diego State	L 55–58	0–2	Viejas Arena (366); San Diego, CA
11/17/2017*; 5:30 p.m.		at New Orleans; Preseason WNIT consolation 2nd round	L 73–76	0–3	Lakefront Arena (417); New Orleans, LA
11/18/2017*; 12:00 p.m.		vs. Milwaukee; Preseason WNIT consolation 2nd round	L 50–58	0–4	Lakefront Arena (50); New Orleans, LA
11/24/2017*; 7:30 p.m.		Idaho; Warner Center Marriott Thanksgiving Basketball Classic	L 75–80	0–5	Matadome (556); Northridge, CA
11/25/2017*; 5:00 p.m.		Arizona; Warner Center Marriott Thanksgiving Basketball Classic	W 66–63	1–5	Matadome (307); Northridge, CA
11/30/2017*; 7:00 p.m.		Weber State	L 61–64	1–6	Matadome (356); Northridge, CA
12/02/2017*; 7:00 p.m.		Fresno State	W 85–72	2–6	Matadome (237); Northridge, CA
12/07/2017*; 7:00 p.m.		at San Jose State	W 86–59	3–6	Event Center Arena (727); San Jose, CA
12/09/2017*; 2:00 p.m.		at Loyola Marymount	W 75–68	4–6	Gersten Pavilion (286); Los Angeles, CA
12/18/2017*; 7:00 p.m.		Northern Arizona	W 78–69	5–6	Matadome (252); Northridge, CA
12/20/2017*; 2:00 p.m.		Omaha	L 60–68	5–7	Matadome (225); Northridge, CA
12/28/2017*; 7:00 p.m.		Biola	W 68–51	6–7	Matadome (239); Northridge, CA
12/30/2017*; 4:00 p.m.		Seattle	W 67–62	7–7	Matadome (422); Northridge, CA
Big West regular season
01/06/2018; 6:00 p.m.		at Cal State Fullerton	W 70–68	8–7 (1–0)	Titan Gym (186); Fullerton, CA
01/11/2018; 7:00 p.m.		UC Santa Barbara	L 73–74	8–8 (1–1)	Matadome (323); Northridge, CA
01/13/2018; 2:00 p.m.		at Cal Poly	L 71–84	8–9 (1–2)	Mott Athletics Center (631); San Luis Obispo, CA
01/18/2018; 7:00 p.m.		Cal State Fullerton	W 65–41	9–9 (2–2)	Matadome (355); Northridge, CA
01/20/2018; 7:00 p.m., ESPN3		UC Riverside	W 60–55	10–9 (3–2)	Matadome (470); Northridge, CA
01/25/2018; 9:00 p.m.		at Hawaii	W 70–58	11–9 (4–2)	Stan Sheriff Center (1,379); Honolulu, HI
01/27/2018; 2:00 p.m.		at UC Irvine	L 47–56	11–10 (4–3)	Bren Events Center (334); Irvine, CA
01/31/2018; 7:00 p.m.		at UC Santa Barbara	W 48–30	12–10 (5–3)	The Thunderdome (528); Santa Barbara, CA
02/03/2018; 4:00 p.m.		UC Aggies	W 75–71 ^{OT}	13–10 (6–3)	Matadome (356); Northridge, CA
02/08/2018; 7:00 p.m.		Long Beach State	L 51–59	13–11 (6–4)	Matadome (402); Northridge, CA
02/10/2018; 2:30 p.m.		at UC Aggies	L 46–72	13–12 (6–5)	The Pavilion; Davis, CA
02/15/2018; 7:00 p.m.		at UC Riverside	L 58–69	13–13 (6–6)	SRC Arena (722); Riverside, CA
02/17/2018; 4:00 p.m.		Cal Poly	W 86–66	14–13 (7–6)	Matadome (727); Northridge, CA
02/22/2018; 7:00 p.m., ESPN3		Hawaii	L 54–56	14–14 (7–7)	Matadome (594); Northridge, CA
03/01/2018; 7:00 p.m.		UC Irvine	W 71–67	15–14 (8–7)	Matadome (437); Northridge, CA
03/03/2018; 4:00 p.m.		at Long Beach State	L 54–67	15–15 (8–8)	Walter Pyramid (724); Long Beach, CA
Big West women's tournament
03/06/2018; 6:00 p.m., ESPN3	(5)	vs. (8) Hawaii; First round	W 62–57	16–15	Titan Gym; Fullerton, CA
03/07/2018; 8:30 p.m., ESPN3	(5)	vs. (4) Cal Poly; Quarterfinals	W 72–63	17–15	Matadome (502); Fullerton, CA
03/09/2018; 2:30 p.m., ESPN3	(5)	vs. (2) Cal Poly; Semifinals	W 73–50	18–15	Honda Center (867); Anaheim, CA
03/10/2018; 4:00 p.m., Prime Ticket	(5)	vs. (1) UC Davis; Championship game	W 63–55	19–15	Honda Center (1,273); Anaheim, CA
NCAA women's tournament
03/16/2018*; 2:00 p.m., ESPN2	(16 S)	at (1 S) No. 5 Notre Dame; First round	L 81–99	19–16	Edmund P. Joyce Center; South Bend, IN
*Non-conference game. ^{#}Rankings from AP poll. (#) Tournament seedings in parentheses. S=Spokane Region. All times are in Pacific.

== See also ==
- 2017–18 Cal State Northridge Matadors men's basketball team
