= 2017–18 Georgetown Hoyas women's basketball team =

Intercollegiate basketball season

2017–18 Georgetown Hoyas women's basketball

WNIT, Second Round
- Conference: Big East
- Record: 16–16 (9–9 Big East)
- Head coach: James Howard (1st season)
- Assistant coaches: Niki Reid Geckeler; Andre Bolton; Erin Dickerson
- Home arena: McDonough Gymnasium

2017–18 Big East Conference women's basketball standings
| | Conf. | | | | Overall |
| Team | W | | L | PCT | W | | L | PCT |
|---|---|---|---|---|---|---|---|---|
| DePaul † | 15 | – | 3 | .833 | 27 | – | 8 | .771 |
| Marquette | 15 | – | 3 | .833 | 24 | – | 10 | .706 |
| Villanova | 12 | – | 6 | .667 | 23 | – | 9 | .719 |
| Creighton | 11 | – | 7 | .611 | 19 | – | 13 | .594 |
| St. John's | 9 | – | 9 | .500 | 19 | – | 15 | .559 |
| Georgetown | 9 | – | 9 | .500 | 16 | – | 16 | .500 |
| Seton Hall | 7 | – | 11 | .389 | 16 | – | 16 | .500 |
| Butler | 6 | – | 12 | .333 | 15 | – | 17 | .469 |
| Xavier | 3 | – | 15 | .167 | 10 | – | 20 | .333 |
| Providence | 3 | – | 15 | .167 | 10 | – | 21 | .323 |
† 2018 Big East tournament winner As of 25 March 2018; Rankings from AP poll

The 2017–18 Georgetown Hoyas women's basketball team represented Georgetown University in the 2017–18 college basketball season. The Hoyas, led by first-year head coach James Howard, were members of the Big East Conference. The Hoyas played their home games at the McDonough Gymnasium. They finished the season 16–16, 9–9 in Big East play to finish in a tie for fifth place. They advanced to the semifinals of the Big East women's tournament, where they lost to DePaul. They received an at-large bid to the WNIT, where they defeated Delaware in the first round before losing to Duquesne in the second round.

== Previous season ==
The Hoyas finished the season 17–13, 9–9 in Big East play to finish in sixth place. They lost in the quarterfinals of the Big East women's tournament to Marquette. They were invited to the WNIT, where they lost to Fordham in the first round.

== Roster ==
2017–18 Georgetown Hoyas women's basketball team
Players
Coaches

| Pos. | # | Name | Height | Year | Previous school | Hometown |
|---|---|---|---|---|---|---|
| G | 0 | Brianna Jones (redshirt) | 5 ft 9 in (1.75 m) | Jr | North Babylon; Louisville | North Babylon, NY |
| F | 1 | Tatiana Thompson | 6 ft 0 in (1.83 m) | Fr | Winter Haven | Winter Haven, FL |
| G | 2 | Didi Burton | 5 ft 5 in (1.65 m) | Sr | Baltimore City College | Baltimore, MD |
| G | 3 | Morgan Smith | 6 ft 0 in (1.83 m) | So | Riverdale Baptist | Upper Marlboro, MD |
| F | 5 | Cynthia Petke | 6 ft 2 in (1.88 m) | Sr | Chipola College | Yaoundé, Cameroon |
| G | 10 | Lexi Kimball | 5 ft 10 in (1.78 m) | Fr | Greens Farms Academy | Westport, CT |
| G | 11 | Dionna White | 5 ft 5 in (1.65 m) | Jr | Milford Mill | Baltimore, MD |
| G | 12 | Marvellous Osagie-Erese | 5 ft 4 in (1.63 m) | So | East Orange STEM Academy | East Orange, NJ |
| F | 13 | Anita Kelava (redshirt) | 6 ft 3 in (1.91 m) | So | Croatian National Team; Maine | Zagreb, Croatia |
| G | 15 | Mikayla Venson | 5 ft 7 in (1.7 m) | RS Jr | Yorktown; Virginia | Arlington, VA |
| C | 21 | Breonna Mayfield | 6 ft 5 in (1.96 m) | Fr | Good Counsel | Clinton, MD |
| F | 25 | Sari Cureton | 6 ft 1 in (1.85 m) | Fr | Walled Lake Western | Farmington, MI |
| C | 32 | Yazmine Belk | 6 ft 3 in (1.91 m) | Sr | Nazareth Regional | Queens, NY |
| G | 34 | Dorothy Adomako | 6 ft 1 in (1.85 m) | Sr | Cosby | Midlothian, VA |

Head coach

- James Howard (Greensboro)

Assistant coach(es)

- Niki Reid Geckeler (Georgetown)
- Andre Bolton (Christopher Newport)
- Erin Dickerson (Northwestern)

Legend

- (C) Team captain
- (S) Suspended
- (I) Ineligible
- (W) Walk-on
- Injured
- Current redshirt

Roster
Last update: February 23, 2018

== Schedule ==
| Date time, TV | Rank^{#} | Opponent^{#} | Result | Record | Site (attendance) city, state |
Non-conference regular season
| 11/14/2017*; 7:00 pm | | Howard | W 93–41 | 1–0 | McDonough Gymnasium (393); Washington, D.C. |
| 11/16/2017*; 7:00 pm | | at Loyola (MD) | W 72–54 | 2–0 | Reitz Arena (273); Baltimore, MD |
| 11/19/2017*; 2:00 pm | | at George Washington | L 54–65 | 2–1 | Charles E. Smith Center (1,008); Washington, D.C. |
| 11/24/2017*; 8:30 pm | | vs. Auburn; Challenge in Music City | L 40–60 | 2–2 | Nashville Municipal Auditorium; Nashville, TN |
| 11/25/2017*; 8:30 pm | | vs. Chattanooga; Challenge in Music City | L 41–54 | 2–3 | Nashville Municipal Auditorium (534); Nashville, TN |
| 11/26/2017*; 3:00 pm | | vs. Northwestern; Challenge in Music City | W 55–54 | 3–3 | Nashville Municipal Auditorium (217); Nashville, TN |
| 11/29/2017*; 7:00 pm | | FIU | W 77–56 | 4–3 | McDonough Gymnasium (239); Washington, D.C. |
| 12/03/2017*; 7:00 pm | | Minnesota | L 63–73 | 4–4 | McDonough Gymnasium (307); Washington, D.C. |
| 12/10/2017*; 2:00 pm, ACCN Extra | | at NC State | L 49–63 | 4–5 | Reynolds Coliseum (2,174); Raleigh, NC |
| 12/21/2017*; 6:00 pm | | at VCU | W 71–59 | 5–5 | Siegel Center (922); Richmond, VA |
Conference regular season
| 12/28/2017; 7:00 pm, BEDN | | at Providence | W 75–43 | 6–5 (1–0) | Alumni Hall (331); Providence, RI |
| 12/30/2017; 2:00 pm, BEDN | | at Creighton | L 58–69 | 6–6 (1–1) | D. J. Sokol Arena (745); Omaha, NE |
| 01/02/2018; 2:00 pm, BEDN | | Xavier | W 65–60 | 7–6 (2–1) | McDonough Gymnasium (391); Washington, D.C. |
| 01/05/2018; 7:00 pm, BEDN | | Butler | L 57–66 | 7–7 (2–2) | McDonough Gymnasium (297); Washington, D.C. |
| 01/10/2018; 7:00 pm, BEDN | | Villanova | L 58–60 | 7–8 (2–3) | McDonough Gymnasium (827); Washington, D.C. |
| 01/12/2018; 7:00 pm, BEDN | | at St. John's | L 41–64 | 7–9 (2–4) | Carnesecca Arena (561); Queens, NY |
| 01/14/2018; 1:00 pm, BEDN | | at Seton Hall | L 65–70 | 7–10 (2–5) | Walsh Gymnasium (895); South Orange, NJ |
| 01/19/2018; 7:00 pm, BEDN | | Marquette | L 65–70 | 8–10 (3–5) | McDonough Gymnasium (877); Washington, D.C. |
| 01/21/2018; 3:00 pm, CBSSN | | DePaul | L 62–78 | 8–11 (3–6) | McDonough Gymnasium (1,191); Washington, D.C. |
| 01/26/2018; 7:00 pm, BEDN | | at Butler | W 63–52 | 9–11 (4–6) | Hinkle Fieldhouse (773); Indianapolis, IN |
| 01/28/2018; 2:00 pm, FS2 | | at Xavier | W 65–48 | 10–11 (5–6) | Cintas Center (2,400); Cincinnati, OH |
| 02/03/2018; 1:00 pm, BEDN | | at Villanova | L 67–68 | 10–12 (5–7) | Jake Nevin Field House (827); Villanova, PA |
| 02/09/2018; 2:00 pm, BEDN | | Seton Hall | W 71–52 | 11–12 (6–7) | McDonough Gymnasium (229); Washington, D.C. |
| 02/11/2018; 2:00 pm, BEDN | | St. John's | L 63–71 | 11–13 (6–8) | McDonough Gymnasium (1,133); Washington, D.C. |
| 02/16/2018; 8:00 pm, BEDN | | at DePaul | W 86–85 | 12–13 (7–8) | McGrath-Phillips Arena (1,890); Chicago, IL |
| 02/18/2018; 3:00 pm, BEDN | | at Marquette | L 68–71 | 12–14 (7–9) | Al McGuire Center (895); Milwaukee, WI |
| 02/23/2018; 11:00 am, BEDN | | Creighton | W 70–67 | 13–14 (8–9) | McDonough Gymnasium (2,257); Washington, D.C. |
| 02/25/2018; 2:00 pm, BEDN | | Providence | W 74–48 | 14–14 (9–9) | McDonough Gymnasium; Washington, D.C. |
Big East Women's Tournament
| 03/04/2018; 9:30 pm, FS2 | (6) | vs. (3) Villanova; Quarterfinals | W 63–58 | 15–14 | Wintrust Arena (2,147); Chicago, IL |
| 03/05/2018; 6:30 pm, FS1 | (6) | vs. (2) DePaul; Semifinals | L 53–85 | 15–15 | Wintrust Arena (2,192); Chicago, IL |
NCAA Women's Tournament
| 03/16/2018*; 7:00 pm | | Delaware; First Round | W 67–57 | 16–15 | McDonough Gymnasium (653); Washington, D.C. |
| 03/19/2018*; 7:00 pm | | Duquesne; Second Round | L 66–69 | 16–16 | McDonough Gymnasium (285); Washington, D.C. |
*Non-conference game. ^{#}Rankings from AP Poll. (#) Tournament seedings in parentheses. All times are in Eastern.

== Rankings ==
Regular season polls
| Poll | Pre- season | Week 2 | Week 3 | Week 4 | Week 5 | Week 6 | Week 7 | Week 8 | Week 9 | Week 10 | Week 11 | Week 12 | Week 13 | Week 14 | Week 15 | Week 16 | Week 17 | Week 18 | Week 19 | Final |
|---|---|---|---|---|---|---|---|---|---|---|---|---|---|---|---|---|---|---|---|---|
| AP | | | | | | | | | | | | | | | | | | | | N/A |
| Coaches | | | | | | | | | | | | | | | | | | | | |

Legend
| | Increase in ranking |
| | Decrease in ranking |
| | No change |
| (RV) | Received votes |
| (NR) | Not ranked |

== See also ==
- 2017–18 Georgetown Hoyas men's basketball team
