= 2017–18 Seton Hall Pirates women's basketball team =

Intercollegiate basketball season

2017–18 Seton Hall Pirates women's basketball

SHU Thanksgiving Classic Champions

WNIT, First Round
- Conference: Big East Conference
- Record: 16–16 (7–11 Big East)
- Head coach: Anthony Bozzella (5th season)
- Assistant coaches: Lauren DeFalco; Marissa Flagg; Nick DiPillo
- Home arena: Walsh Gymnasium

2017–18 Big East Conference women's basketball standings
	Conf.				Overall
Team	W		L	PCT	W		L	PCT
DePaul †	15	–	3	.833	27	–	8	.771
Marquette	15	–	3	.833	24	–	10	.706
Villanova	12	–	6	.667	23	–	9	.719
Creighton	11	–	7	.611	19	–	13	.594
St. John's	9	–	9	.500	19	–	15	.559
Georgetown	9	–	9	.500	16	–	16	.500
Seton Hall	7	–	11	.389	16	–	16	.500
Butler	6	–	12	.333	15	–	17	.469
Xavier	3	–	15	.167	10	–	20	.333
Providence	3	–	15	.167	10	–	21	.323
† 2018 Big East tournament winner As of 25 March 2018; Rankings from AP poll

The 2017–18 Seton Hall Pirates women's basketball team represented Seton Hall University during the 2017–18 NCAA Division I women's basketball season. The Pirates, led by fifth year head coach Anthony Bozzella, played their home games in South Orange, New Jersey at the Walsh Gymnasium as members of the Big East Conference. They finished the season 16–16, 7–11 in Big East play to finish in seventh place. They advanced to the quarterfinals of the Big East women's tournament where they lost to DePaul. They received an at-large berth in the WNIT where they lost to Saint Joseph's in the first round.

== Previous season ==
They finished the season 12–19, 4–14 in Big East play to finish in a tie for seventh place. They advance to the quarterfinals of the Big East women's tournament where they lost to DePaul.

== Roster ==
2017–18 Seton Hall Pirates women's basketball team
Players
Coaches

Pos.	#	Name	Height	Year	Previous school	Hometown
G	0	JaQuan Jackson	5 ft 8 in (1.73 m)	RS Sr	Harker Heights; Louisiana Tech	Killeen, TX
G	1	Kaela Hilaire	5 ft 5 in (1.65 m)	So	Floral Park	Floral Park, NY
G	4	Kaity Healy	5 ft 6 in (1.68 m)	RS So	Colts Neck	Colts Neck, NJ
G	5	Inja Butina	5 ft 9 in (1.75 m)	Jr	Gimnazija Zagreb; Hutchinson CC	Zagreb, Croatia
G/F	15	Deja Winters	5 ft 11 in (1.8 m)	So	Richmond Heights	Richmond Heights, OH
C	20	Kimi Evans	6 ft 4 in (1.93 m)	Fr	St. John Vianney	Jackson, NJ
G	21	Nicole Jimenez	5 ft 1 in (1.55 m)	Jr	Florida Christian; Broward College	Miami, FL
F	23	Taylor Brown	6 ft 0 in (1.83 m)	RS So	Eastside; Western Kentucky	Paterson, NJ
G/F	24	Shadeen Samuels	6 ft 0 in (1.83 m)	So	Ossining	Ossining, NY
F/C	31	Jayla Jones-Pack	6 ft 4 in (1.93 m)	So	St. Anthony's	Amityville, NY
F	34	Selena Philoxy	6 ft 1 in (1.85 m)	Fr	South Shore	Queens, NY
G		Victoria Cardaci (redshirt)	5 ft 7 in (1.7 m)	Sr	Holmdel; Clemson	Holmdel, NJ

Head coach

- Anthony Bozzella (Seton Hall)

Assistant coach(es)

- Lauren DeFalco (Iona)
- Marissa Flagg (Iona)
- Nick DiPillo (Fairleigh Dickinson)

Legend

- (C) Team captain
- (S) Suspended
- (I) Ineligible
- (W) Walk-on
- Injured
- Current redshirt

Roster
Last update: February 23, 2018

== Schedule ==
Date time, TV	Rank^{#}	Opponent^{#}	Result	Record	Site (attendance) city, state
Exhibition
11/04/2017*; 12:00 pm		Jefferson	W 89–61		Walsh Gymnasium; South Orange, NJ
Non-conference regular season
11/10/2017*; 1:00 pm, PSN		Saint Peter's	W 91–49	1–0	Walsh Gymnasium (726); South Orange, NJ
11/12/2017*; 2:00 pm		at Wake Forest	W 67–57	2–0	LJVM Coliseum (497); Winston–Salem, NC
11/16/2017*; 7:00 pm, PSN		Princeton	L 83–85	2–1	Walsh Gymnasium (716); South Orange, NJ
11/25/2017*; 12:00 pm, PSN		Rider; SHU Thanksgiving Classic semifinals	W 85–49	3–1	Walsh Gymnasium (848); South Orange, NJ
11/25/2017*; 2:30 pm, PSN		Jacksonville State; SHU Thanksgiving Classic championship	W 73–54	4–1	Walsh Gymnasium (885); South Orange, NJ
11/30/2017*; 7:00 pm, PSN		Marist	W 85–60	5–1	Walsh Gymnasium (895); South Orange, NJ
12/02/2017*; 1:00 pm, PSN		St. Francis Brooklyn	W 84–50	6–1	Walsh Gymnasium (890); South Orange, NJ
12/08/2017*; 2:00 pm		at Rutgers	L 45–70	6–2	Louis Brown Athletic Center (1,235); Piscataway, NJ
12/10/2017*; 1:00 pm, ACCN Extra		at Boston College	W 73–53	7–2	Conte Forum (1,249); Chestnut Hill, MA
12/17/2017*; 1:00 pm, PSN		No. 11 UCLA	L 68–77	7–3	Walsh Gymnasium (1,165); South Orange, NJ
12/21/2017*; 11:00 am, PSN		Fairfield	W 80–61	8–3	Walsh Gymnasium (1,655); South Orange, NJ
Big East regular season
12/28/2017; 8:00 pm, BEDN		at DePaul	L 66–89	8–4 (0–1)	Phillips-McGrath Arena (1,832); Chicago, IL
12/30/2017; 8:30 pm, BEDN		at Marquette	L 72–74	8–5 (0–2)	Al McGuire Center (1,392); Milwaukee, WI
01/02/2018; 7:00 pm, FS2		Creighton	L 51–68	8–6 (0–3)	Walsh Gymnasium (625); South Orange, NJ
01/05/2018; 7:00 pm, FS2		Providence	W 65–56	9–6 (1–3)	Walsh Gymnasium (686); South Orange, NJ
01/07/2018; 1:00 pm, BEDN		at Butler	L 48–66	9–7 (1–4)	Hinkle Fieldhouse (543); Indianapolis, IN
01/10/2018; 7:00 pm, BEDN		at Xavier	W 62–51	10–7 (2–4)	Cintas Center (597); Cincinnati, OH
01/12/2018; 7:00 pm, BEDN		Villanova	L 59–67	10–8 (2–5)	Walsh Gymnasium (881); South Orange, NJ
01/14/2018; 1:00 pm, BEDN		Georgetown	W 70–65	11–8 (3–5)	Walsh Gymnasium (895); South Orange, NJ
01/21/2018; 1:00 pm, BEDN		St. John's	W 62–57	12–8 (4–5)	Walsh Gymnasium (967); South Orange, NJ
01/26/2018; 11:30 am, BEDN		at Providence	W 65–56	13–8 (5–5)	Alumni Hall (1,270); Providence, RI
01/28/2018; 2:00 pm, BEDN		at Creighton	L 39–53	13–9 (5–6)	D. J. Sokol Arena (1,015); Omaha, NE
02/02/2018; 7:00 pm, BEDN		Xavier	W 58–53	14–9 (6–6)	Walsh Gymnasium (787); South Orange, NJ
02/04/2018; 1:00 pm, BEDN		Butler	W 75–64	15–9 (7–6)	Walsh Gymnasium (1,655); South Orange, NJ
02/09/2018; 7:00 pm, BEDN		at Georgetown	L 52–71	15–10 (7–7)	McDonough Gymnasium (229); Washington, D.C.
02/11/2018; 2:00 pm, FS2		at Villanova	L 53–59	15–11 (7–8)	Jake Nevin Field House (1,003); Villanova, PA
02/16/2018; 7:00 pm, FS2		at St. John's	L 56–75	15–12 (7–9)	Carnesecca Arena (755); Queens, NY
02/23/2018; 7:00 pm, BEDN		Marquette	L 54–81	15–13 (7–10)	Walsh Gymnasium (1,074); South Orange, NJ
02/25/2018; 1:00 pm, BEDN		DePaul	L 68–72	15–14 (7–11)	Walsh Gymnasium (1,013); South Orange, NJ
Big East Women's Tournament
03/03/2018; 7:30 pm, BEDN	(7)	vs. (10) Xavier; First Round	W 66–42	16–14	Wintrust Arena (1,950); Chicago, IL
03/04/2018; 7:00 pm, FS2	(7)	vs. (1) DePaul; Quarterfinals	L 52–78	16–15	Wintrust Arena; Chicago, IL
WNIT
03/14/2018*; 7:00 pm		Saint Joseph's; First Round	L 57–75	16–16	Walsh Gymnasium (281); South Orange, NJ
*Non-conference game. ^{#}Rankings from AP Poll. (#) Tournament seedings in parentheses. All times are in Eastern Time.

== See also ==
- 2017–18 Seton Hall Pirates men's basketball team
