= 2017–18 Xavier Musketeers women's basketball team =

Intercollegiate basketball season

2017–18 Xavier Musketeers women's basketball
- Conference: Big East Conference
- Record: 10–20 (3–15 Big East)
- Head coach: Brian Neal (7th season)
- Assistant coaches: Crystal Kelly; Christian Stefanopoulos; Mark Stephens
- Home arena: Cintas Center

2017–18 Big East Conference women's basketball standings
	Conf.				Overall
Team	W		L	PCT	W		L	PCT
DePaul †	15	–	3	.833	27	–	8	.771
Marquette	15	–	3	.833	24	–	10	.706
Villanova	12	–	6	.667	23	–	9	.719
Creighton	11	–	7	.611	19	–	13	.594
St. John's	9	–	9	.500	19	–	15	.559
Georgetown	9	–	9	.500	16	–	16	.500
Seton Hall	7	–	11	.389	16	–	16	.500
Butler	6	–	12	.333	15	–	17	.469
Xavier	3	–	15	.167	10	–	20	.333
Providence	3	–	15	.167	10	–	21	.323
† 2018 Big East tournament winner As of 25 March 2018; Rankings from AP poll

The 2017–18 Xavier Musketeers women's basketball team represented Xavier University during the 2017–18 NCAA Division I women's basketball season. The Musketeers, led by seventh-year head coach Brian Neal, played their games at the Cintas Center and were members of the Big East Conference. They finished the season 10–20, 3–15 in Big East play to finish in a tie for last place. They lost in the first round of the Big East women's tournament to Seton Hall.

== Previous season ==
They finished the season 12–18, 4–14 in Big East play to finish in a tie for seventh place. They lost in the first round of the Big East women's tournament to Butler.

== Roster ==
2017–18 Xavier Musketeers women's basketball team
Players
Coaches

Pos.	#	Name	Height	Year	Previous school	Hometown
G	1	Kindell Fincher	5 ft 9 in (1.75 m)	RS Jr	Canterbury HS	Fort Wayne, IN
F	2	Deja Ross	6 ft 0 in (1.83 m)	Fr	Pomfret	Providence, RI
G	3	Aaliyah Dunham	5 ft 4 in (1.63 m)	Fr	South Charleston	South Charleston, WV
G	5	Princess Stewart	5 ft 9 in (1.75 m)	Fr	Franklin County	Frankfort, KY
G	10	Ashley Gomez	5 ft 9 in (1.75 m)	So	Westmoore HS	Oklahoma City, OK
G	12	Jada Byrd	5 ft 9 in (1.75 m)	Sr	Redan HS	Lithonia GA
G	15	Aly Reiff	5 ft 11 in (1.8 m)	Fr	Whitko	South Whitley, IN
G	20	Na'Teshia Owens	5 ft 5 in (1.65 m)	So	Mexia HS	Mexia, TX
F	21	A'Riana Gray	6 ft 0 in (1.83 m)	Fr	Maple Heights	Cleveland, OH
F	22	Megan Christopher	5 ft 8 in (1.73 m)	So	Turpin HS	Cincinnati, OH
G/F	24	Jordyn Dawson	5 ft 10 in (1.78 m)	Fr	Huntington	Huntington, WV
F	25	Anniina Äijänen	6 ft 2 in (1.88 m)	Sr	Sammon Keskuslukio	Tampere, Finland
F	40	Tierra Floyd	6 ft 1 in (1.85 m)	RS So	St. Bernard-Elmwood Place HS	Toledo, OH
F	45	Imani Partlow	6 ft 1 in (1.85 m)	RS Jr	Winton Woods HS	Cincinnati, OH

Head coach

- Brian Neal (Northern Kentucky)

Assistant coach(es)

- Crystal Kelly (Western Kentucky)
- Christian Stefanopoulos (Thomas More)
- Mark Stephens (Morehead State)

Legend

- (C) Team captain
- (S) Suspended
- (I) Ineligible
- (W) Walk-on
- Injured
- Current redshirt

Roster
Last update: February 23, 2018

== Schedule ==
Date time, TV	Rank^{#}	Opponent^{#}	Result	Record	Site (attendance) city, state
Non-conference regular season
11/11/2017*; 5:00 pm		New Hampshire; Lauren Hill Tipoff Classic	W 71–66 ^{OT}	1–0	Cintas Center (1,922); Cincinnati, OH
11/14/2017*; 7:00 pm		Mount St. Mary's	W 66–45	2–0	Cintas Center (537); Cincinnati, OH
11/16/2017*; 7:00 pm		Grambling State	W 72–67	3–0	Cintas Center (705); Cincinnati, OH
11/22/2017*; 9:00 pm, BTN		at Minnesota	L 62–74	3–1	Williams Arena (2,000); Minneapolis, MN
11/29/2017*; 7:00 pm		Fort Wayne	W 62–50	4–1	Cintas Center (612); Cincinnati, OH
12/04/2017*; 7:00 pm		Wake Forest	L 57–62	4–2	Cintas Center (656); Cincinnati, OH
12/06/2017*; 11:00 am, ESPN3		at Bowling Green	L 53–63	4–3	Stroh Center (4,130); Bowling Green, OH
12/10/2017*; 5:00 pm		Cincinnati	W 53–50	5–3	Cintas Center (1,654); Cincinnati, OH
12/17/2017*; 6:00 pm		vs. Furman; West Palm Beach Invitational Semifinal	W 75–62	6–3	Student Life Center (125); West Palm Beach, FL
12/18/2017*; 5:00 pm		vs. No. 16 Missouri; West Palm Beach Invitational Final	L 48–74	6–4	Student Life Center (350); West Palm Beach, FL
12/22/2017*; 2:00 pm		Florida A&M	W 70–52	7–4	Cintas Center (704); Cincinnati, OH
Big East regular season
12/29/2017; 7:00 pm, FS2		Butler	W 69–62	8–4 (1–0)	Hinkle Fieldhouse (799); Indianapolis, IN
01/02/2018; 7:00 pm, BEDN		at Georgetown	L 60–65	8–5 (1–1)	McDonough Gymnasium (391); Washington, D.C.
01/05/2018; 7:00 pm, BEDN		at No. 21 Villanova	L 57–75	8–6 (1–2)	Jake Nevin Field House (541); Villanova, PA
01/07/2018; 2:00 pm, BEDN		St. John's	L 63–67	8–7 (1–3)	Cintas Center (845); Cincinnati, OH
01/10/2018; 7:00 pm, BEDN		Seton Hall	L 51–62	8–8 (1–4)	Cintas Center (597); Cincinnati, OH
01/12/2018; 6:30 pm, BEDN		at DePaul	L 48–79	8–9 (1–5)	Wintrust Arena (5,354); Chicago, IL
01/14/2018; 3:00 pm, BEDN		at Marquette	L 67–88	8–10 (1–6)	Al McGuire Center (2,003); Milwaukee, WI
01/19/2018; 7:00 pm, BEDN		Providence	W 68–59	9–10 (2–6)	Cintas Center (1,433); Cincinnati, OH
01/22/2018; 12:00 pm, BEDN		Creighton	L 64–71 ^{OT}	9–11 (2–7)	Cintas Center (922); Cincinnati, OH
01/26/2018; 7:00 pm, BEDN		Villanova	L 50–89	9–12 (2–8)	Cintas Center (1,135); Cincinnati, OH
01/28/2018; 2:00 pm, FS2		Georgetown	L 48–65	9–13 (2–9)	Cintas Center (2,400); Cincinnati, OH
02/02/2018; 7:00 pm, BEDN		at Seton Hall	L 53–58	9–14 (2–10)	Walsh Gymnasium (787); South Orange, NJ
02/04/2018; 2:00 pm, BEDN		at St. John's	L 36–70	9–15 (2–11)	Carnesecca Arena; Queens, NY
02/09/2018; 8:00 pm, FS2		Marquette	L 63–80	9–16 (2–12)	Cintas Center (1,483); Cincinnati, OH
02/11/2018; 2:00 pm, BEDN		DePaul	L 72–73	9–17 (2–13)	Cintas Center (1,107); Cincinnati, OH
02/16/2018; 8:00 pm, BEDN		at Creighton	L 54–65	9–18 (2–14)	D. J. Sokol Arena (922); Omaha, NE
02/18/2018; 1:00 pm, BEDN		at Providence	L 48–69	9–19 (2–15)	Alumni Hall (677); Providence, RI
02/25/2017; 7:00 pm, BEDN		Butler	W 57–54	10–19 (3–15)	Cintas Center (1,766); Cincinnati, OH
Big East Women's Tournament
03/03/2018; 7:30 pm, BEDN	(10)	vs. (7) Seton Hall; First Round	L 42–66	10–20	Wintrust Arena (1,950); Chicago, IL
*Non-conference game. ^{#}Rankings from AP Poll. (#) Tournament seedings in parentheses. All times are in Eastern Time.

== See also ==
2017–18 Xavier Musketeers men's basketball team
