= 2017–18 Providence Friars women's basketball team =

Intercollegiate basketball season

2017–18 Providence Friars women's basketball
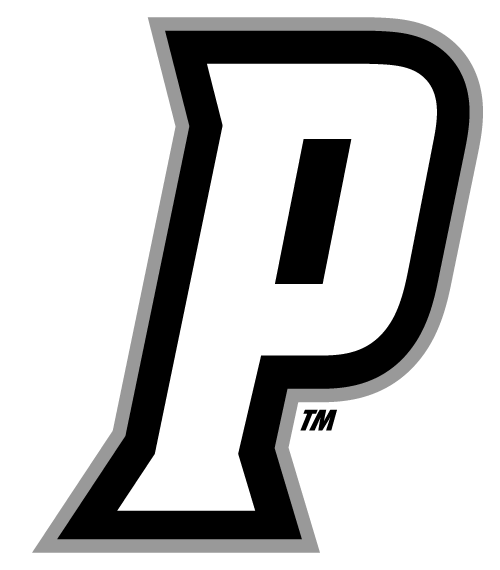

Savannah Invitational Champions
- Conference: Big East
- Record: 10–21 (3–15 Big East)
- Head coach: Jim Crowley (2nd season)
- Assistant coaches: Priscilla Edwards; Tiara Johnson; Jessica Jenkins
- Home arena: Alumni Hall

2017–18 Big East Conference women's basketball standings
	Conf.				Overall
Team	W		L	PCT	W		L	PCT
DePaul †	15	–	3	.833	27	–	8	.771
Marquette	15	–	3	.833	24	–	10	.706
Villanova	12	–	6	.667	23	–	9	.719
Creighton	11	–	7	.611	19	–	13	.594
St. John's	9	–	9	.500	19	–	15	.559
Georgetown	9	–	9	.500	16	–	16	.500
Seton Hall	7	–	11	.389	16	–	16	.500
Butler	6	–	12	.333	15	–	17	.469
Xavier	3	–	15	.167	10	–	20	.333
Providence	3	–	15	.167	10	–	21	.323
† 2018 Big East tournament winner As of 25 March 2018; Rankings from AP poll

The 2017–18 Providence Friars women's basketball team represented Providence College in the 2017–18 NCAA Division I women's basketball season. The Friars, led by second-year head coach Jim Crowley, played their home games at Alumni Hall and were members of the Big East Conference. They finished the season 10–21, 3–15 in Big East play to finish in a tie for last place. They lost in the first round of the Big East women's tournament to Butler.

== Previous season ==
They finished the season 12–18, 4–14 in Big East play to finish in a tie for seventh place. They lost in the first round of the Big East women's tournament to Seton Hall.

== Roster ==
2017–18 Providence Friars women's basketball team
Players
Coaches

Pos.	#	Name	Height	Year	Previous school	Hometown
G	2	Chanell Williams	5 ft 4 in (1.63 m)	Fr	Monsignor Scanlan	Bronx, NY
G	5	Kyra Spiwak	5 ft 9 in (1.75 m)	Fr	Rolling Meadows	Arlington Heights, IL
G	10	Allegra Botteghi	6 ft 0 in (1.83 m)	Sr	G. Parini	Bologna, Italy
G	11	Jovana Nogic	6 ft 1 in (1.85 m)	Jr	Vergilio Ferreira	Belgrade, Serbia
G	20	Ny'Dajah Jackson	5 ft 5 in (1.65 m)	So	Piedmont	Oakland, CA
G	21	Maddie Jolin	5 ft 9 in (1.75 m)	Jr	Bishop Feehan	Rehoboth, MA
G	22	Olivia Orlando	5 ft 10 in (1.78 m)	Fr	Tilton School	Winthrop, MA
G	23	Clara Che	5 ft 8 in (1.73 m)	Jr	Institut Joaquim Blume	Valencia, Spain
F	24	Ny-Asia Franklin	6 ft 1 in (1.85 m)	Jr	East Orange; ASA Junior	East Orange, NJ
F	25	Brianna Frias	6 ft 3 in (1.91 m)	Sr	Holy Name Central	Worcester, MA
F	33	Andrea Cooper	5 ft 10 in (1.78 m)	Fr	Edmond Santa Fe	Edmond, OK

Head coach

- Jim Crowley (Keuka)

Assistant coach(es)

- Priscilla Edwards (St. Bonaventure)
- Tiara Johnson (St. Bonaventure)
- Jessica Jenkins (St. Bonaventure)

Legend

- (C) Team captain
- (S) Suspended
- (I) Ineligible
- (W) Walk-on
- Injured
- Current redshirt

Roster
Last update: February 23, 2018

== Schedule ==
Date time, TV	Rank^{#}	Opponent^{#}	Result	Record	Site (attendance) city, state
Exhibition
11/04/2017*; 1:00 pm		Merrimack	W 73–32		Alumni Hall; Providence, RI
Non-conference regular season
11/10/2017*; 3:30 pm		Columbia	L 64–73	0–1	Alumni Hall (231); Providence, RI
11/14/2017*; 7:00 pm		at Northeastern	W 98–95 ^{OT}	1–1	Cabot Center (338); Boston, MA
11/18/2017*; 1:00 pm, YurView		Penn State	L 51–60	1–2	Alumni Hall (422); Providence, RI
11/21/2017*; 7:00 pm		vs. Savannah State; Savannah Invitational	W 78–48	2–2	Savannah Civic Center (322); Savannah, GA
11/22/2017*; 4:30 pm		vs. Wright State; Savannah Invitational	W 74–69	3–2	Savannah Civic Center; Savannah, GA
11/23/2017*; 4:30 pm		vs. Stetson; Savannah Invitational	W 56–45	4–2	Savannah Civic Center (75); Savannah, GA
11/29/2017*; 6:00 pm, ESPN3		at Yale	W 55–51	5–2	John J. Lee Amphitheater; New Haven, CT
12/02/2017*; 12:00 pm, Yurview		Brown; Ocean State Tip-Off semifinals	L 59–64	5–3	Alumni Hall; Providence, RI
12/03/2017*; 12:00 pm, Yurview		Rhode Island; Ocean State Tip-Off 3rd place game	W 65–41	6–3	Alumni Hall; Providence, RI
12/06/2017*; 7:00 pm, ESPN3		at Quinnipiac	L 36–62	6–4	TD Bank Sports Center (517); Hamden, CT
12/09/2017*; 1:00 pm		at Sacred Heart	L 75–78	6–5	William H. Pitt Center; Fairfield, CT
12/21/2017*; 12:00 pm, Yurview		Boston College	W 63–55	7–5	Alumni Hall (424); Providence, RI
Big East regular season
12/28/2017; 7:00 pm, BEDN		Georgetown	L 43–75	7–6 (0–1)	Alumni Hall (331); Providence, RI
12/30/2017; 1:00 pm, BEDN		No. 18 Villanova	L 55–63	7–7 (0–2)	Alumni Hall (528); Providence, RI
01/02/2018; 7:00 pm, BEDN		at St. John's	W 49–44	8–7 (1–2)	Carnesecca Arena (566); Queens, NY
01/05/2018; 7:00 pm, FS2		at Seton Hall	L 56–65	8–8 (1–3)	Walsh Gymnasium (686); South Orange, NJ
01/07/2018; 1:00 pm, BEDN		DePaul	L 48–71	8–9 (1–4)	Alumni Hall (326); Providence, RI
01/10/2018; 7:00 pm, BEDN		Marquette	L 60–77	8–10 (1–5)	Alumni Hall (257); Providence, RI
01/13/2018; 2:00 pm, BEDN		at Creighton	L 56–73	8–11 (1–6)	D. J. Sokol Arena (951); Omaha, NE
01/19/2018; 2:00 pm, BEDN		at Xavier	L 59–68	8–12 (1–7)	Cintas Center (1,433); Cincinnati, OH
01/21/2018; 1:00 pm, BEDN		at Butler	L 59–68	8–13 (1–8)	Hinkle Fieldhouse (862); Indianapolis, IN
01/26/2018; 11:30 am, BEDN		Seton Hall	L 56–65	8–14 (1–9)	Alumni Hall (1,270); Providence, RI
01/28/2018; 1:00 pm, BEDN		St. John's	W 70–68	9–14 (2–9)	Alumni Hall (690); Providence, RI
02/02/2018; 8:00 pm, BEDN		at Marquette	L 63–94	9–15 (2–10)	Al McGuire Center (2,019); Milwaukee, WI
02/04/2018; 3:00 pm, BEDN		at DePaul	L 47–81	9–16 (2–11)	McGrath-Phillips Arena (2,235); Chicago, IL
02/10/2018; 12:00 pm, BEDN		Creighton	L 84–87 ^{2OT}	9–17 (2–12)	Alumni Hall (439); Providence, RI
02/16/2018; 1:00 pm, BEDN		Butler	L 59–68	9–18 (2–13)	Alumni Hall (463); Providence, RI
02/18/2018; 1:00 pm, BEDN		Xavier	W 69–48	10–18 (3–13)	Alumni Hall (677); Providence, RI
02/23/2018; 7:00 pm, BEDN		at Villanova	L 43–70	10–19 (3–14)	Jake Nevin Field House (541); Villanova, PA
02/25/2018; 2:00 pm, BEDN		at Georgetown	L 48–74	10–20 (3–15)	McDonough Gymnasium (331); Washington, D.C.
Big East Women's Tournament
03/03/2018; 5:00 pm, BEDN	(9)	vs. (8) Butler; First Round	L 67–73 ^{OT}	10–21	Wintrust Arena; Chicago, IL
*Non-conference game. ^{#}Rankings from AP Poll. (#) Tournament seedings in parentheses. All times are in Eastern.

== See also ==
- 2017–18 Providence Friars men's basketball team
