= 2017–18 Creighton Bluejays women's basketball team =

Intercollegiate basketball season

2017–18 Creighton Bluejays women's basketball

NCAA Women's Tournament, second round
- Conference: Big East
- Record: 19–13 (11–7 Big East)
- Head coach: Jim Flanery (15th season)
- Assistant coaches: Carli Tritz; Chevelle Saunsoci; Linda Sayavongchanh
- Home arena: D. J. Sokol Arena

2017–18 Big East Conference women's basketball standings
	Conf.				Overall
Team	W		L	PCT	W		L	PCT
DePaul †	15	–	3	.833	27	–	8	.771
Marquette	15	–	3	.833	24	–	10	.706
Villanova	12	–	6	.667	23	–	9	.719
Creighton	11	–	7	.611	19	–	13	.594
St. John's	9	–	9	.500	19	–	15	.559
Georgetown	9	–	9	.500	16	–	16	.500
Seton Hall	7	–	11	.389	16	–	16	.500
Butler	6	–	12	.333	15	–	17	.469
Xavier	3	–	15	.167	10	–	20	.333
Providence	3	–	15	.167	10	–	21	.323
† 2018 Big East tournament winner As of 25 March 2018; Rankings from AP poll

The 2017–18 Creighton Bluejays women's basketball team represented Creighton University in the 2017–18 NCAA Division I women's basketball season. The Bluejays, led by fifteenth year head coach Jim Flanery, played their home games at D. J. Sokol Arena and were members of the Big East Conference. They finished the season 19–13, 11–7 in Big East play to finish in fourth place. They advanced to the semifinals of the Big East women's tournament, where they lost to Marquette. They received an at-large bid to the NCAA women's tournament, where they defeated Iowa in the first round before losing to UCLA in the second round.

== Previous season ==
They finished the season 24–8, 16–2 in Big East play to share the Big East regular season title with DePaul. They advanced to the semifinals of the Big East women's tournament where they lost to Marquette. They received an at-large bid to the NCAA women's tournament where they defeated Toledo in the first round before losing to Oregon State in the second round.

== Roster ==
2017–18 Creighton Bluejays women's basketball team
Players
Coaches

Pos.	#	Name	Height	Year	Previous school	Hometown
G	1	Jade Owens	5 ft 6 in (1.68 m)	RS Jr	Fenwick	River Forest, IL
G	2	Myah Mellman	5 ft 7 in (1.7 m)	Sr	Mason City	Mason City, IA
G	4	Aimee Rischard	5 ft 5 in (1.65 m)	Sr	Mount Saint Mary Catholic	Oklahoma City, OK
F	5	Jaylyn Agnew	5 ft 11 in (1.8 m)	RS So	Andover	Andover, KS
F	11	Bailey Norby	6 ft 2 in (1.88 m)	RS Sr	Forest Lake	Forest Lake, MN
F	12	Gracey Griglione	6 ft 2 in (1.88 m)	Fr	Interstate 35	Truro, IA
G	14	Sydney Lamberty	5 ft 10 in (1.78 m)	Sr	Park	Cottage Grove, MN
G	15	Tatum Rembao	5 ft 9 in (1.75 m)	Fr	Loveland	Loveland, CO
G	21	Olivia Elger	5 ft 7 in (1.7 m)	RS So	Richwoods	Peoria, IL
G	22	Brooke Kissinger	5 ft 7 in (1.7 m)	RS Jr	Minden; Illinois	Minden, NE
G	24	Temi Carda	5 ft 7 in (1.7 m)	Fr	Lakeville North	Lakeville, MN
F	33	Kylie Brown	6 ft 3 in (1.91 m)	Sr	Simley	Inver Grove Heights, MN
F	40	Ali Greene	6 ft 1 in (1.85 m)	RS So	Mahtomedi	Lino Lakes, MN
F	45	Audrey Faber	6 ft 2 in (1.88 m)	Jr	Dowling Catholic	Clive, IA

Head coach

- Jim Flanery (Creighton)

Assistant coach(es)

- Carli Tritz (Creighton)
- Chevelle Saunsoci (Creighton)
- Linda Sayavongchanh (Drake)

Legend

- (C) Team captain
- (S) Suspended
- (I) Ineligible
- (W) Walk-on
- Injured
- Current redshirt

Roster
Last update: February 21, 2018

== Schedule ==
Date time, TV	Rank^{#}	Opponent^{#}	Result	Record	Site (attendance) city, state
Exhibition
11/01/2017*; 6:00 pm		Northern State	W 68–63		D. J. Sokol Arena; Omaha, NE
Non-conference regular season
11/10/2017*; 11:30 am		Wichita State	W 66–61	1–0	D. J. Sokol Arena (1,323); Omaha, NE
11/14/2017*; 7:00 pm		at South Dakota	L 68–73	1–1	Sanford Coyote Sports Center (1,997); Vermillion, SD
11/19/2017*; 7:00 pm		at Nebraska	W 64–49	2–1	Pinnacle Bank Arena (4,324); Lincoln, NE
11/21/2017*; 6:00 pm		Northern Iowa	W 89–78 ^{2OT}	3–1	D. J. Sokol Arena (632); Omaha, NE
11/24/2017*; 1:00 pm		vs. Washington; South Point Thanksgiving Shootout	L 64–67	3–2	South Point Arena (175); Enterprise, NV
11/25/2017*; 3:30 pm		vs. No. 5 UCLA; South Point Thanksgiving Shootout	L 63–72	3–3	South Point Arena (550); Enterprise, NV
12/03/2017*; 2:00 pm		at Drake	W 108–100 ^{4OT}	4–3	Knapp Center (2,863); Des Moines, IA
12/10/2017*; 1:00 pm		at Omaha	W 72–51	5–3	Baxter Arena (2,043); Omaha, NE
12/15/2017*; 4:00 pm		South Dakota State	W 72–65	6–3	D. J. Sokol Arena (780); Omaha, NE
12/21/2017*; 6:00 pm		No. 13 Florida State	L 82–92	6–4	D. J. Sokol Arena (760); Omaha, NE
Big East regular season
12/28/2017; 7:00 pm, BEDN		No. 18 Villanova	W 69–54	7–4 (1–0)	D. J. Sokol Arena (1,120); Omaha, NE
12/30/2017; 1:00 pm, BEDN		Georgetown	W 69–58	8–4 (2–0)	D. J. Sokol Arena (745); Omaha, NE
01/02/2018; 6:00 pm, FS2		at Seton Hall	W 68–51	9–4 (3–0)	Walsh Gymnasium (625); South Orange, NJ
01/05/2018; 6:00 pm, BEDN		at St. John's	L 65–72 ^{OT}	9–5 (3–1)	Carnesecca Arena (625); Queens, NY
01/07/2018; 1:00 pm, FS2		Marquette	L 77–92	9–6 (3–2)	D. J. Sokol Arena (1,109); Omaha, NE
01/10/2018; 8:00 pm, BEDN		DePaul	L 54–82	9–7 (3–3)	D. J. Sokol Arena (672); Omaha, NE
01/13/2018; 1:00 pm, BEDN		Providence	W 73–56	10–7 (4–3)	D. J. Sokol Arena (951); Omaha, NE
01/19/2018; 6:00 pm, BEDN		at Butler	L 53–59	10–8 (4–4)	Hinkle Fieldhouse (922); Indianapolis, IN
01/22/2018; 11:00 am, BEDN		at Xavier	W 71–64 ^{OT}	11–8 (5–4)	Cintas Center (922); Cincinnati, OH
01/26/2018; 7:00 pm, BEDN		St. John's	L 65–72	11–9 (5–5)	D. J. Sokol Arena (1,316); Omaha, NE
01/28/2018; 1:00 pm, BEDN		Seton Hall	W 53–39	12–9 (6–5)	D. J. Sokol Arena (1,015); Omaha, NE
02/02/2018; 7:00 pm, BEDN		at DePaul	L 67–77	12–10 (7–5)	McGrath-Phillips Arena (1,828); Chicago, IL
02/04/2018; 1:00 pm, BEDN		at Marquette	W 74–73	13–10 (8–5)	Al McGuire Center (1,612); Milwaukee, WI
02/10/2018; 11:00 am, BEDN		at Providence	W 87–84 ^{2OT}	14–10 (9–5)	Alumni Hall (439); Providence, RI
02/16/2018; 7:00 pm, BEDN		Xavier	W 65–54	15–10 (10–5)	D. J. Sokol Arena (1,002); Omaha, NE
02/18/2018; 1:00 pm, BEDN		Butler	W 64–55	16–10 (11–5)	D. J. Sokol Arena (1,261); Omaha, NE
02/23/2018; 10:00 am, BEDN		at Georgetown	L 67–70	16–11 (11–6)	McDonough Gymnasium (2,257); Washington, D.C.
02/25/2018; 1:00 pm, FS1		Villanova	W 55–48	17–11 (12–6)	Jake Nevin Field House (801); Villanova, PA
Big East Women's Tournament
03/04/2018; 2:30 pm, FS2	(4)	vs. (5) St. John's; Quarterfinals	W 66–58	18–11	Wintrust Arena (1,991); Chicago, IL
03/05/2018; 3:00 pm, FS1	(4)	vs. (1) Marquette; Semifinals	L 70–76	18–12	Wintrust Arena; Chicago, IL
NCAA Women's Tournament
03/17/2018*; 5:00 pm, ESPN2	(11 KC)	vs. (6 KC) Iowa; First Round	W 76–70	19–12	Pauley Pavilion (2,304); Los Angeles, CA
03/19/2018*; 8:00 pm, ESPN2	(11 KC)	at (3 KC) No. 9 UCLA; Second Round	L 64–86	19–13	Pauley Pavilion (1,860); Los Angeles, CA
*Non-conference game. ^{#}Rankings from AP Poll. (#) Tournament seedings in parentheses. KC=Kansas City Region. All times are in Central.

== Rankings ==
2017–18 NCAA Division I women's basketball rankings

+ Regular season polls	Poll	Pre- Season	Week 2	Week 3	Week 4	Week 5	Week 6	Week 7	Week 8	Week 9	Week 10	Week 11	Week 12	Week 13	Week 14	Week 15	Week 16	Week 17	Week 18	Week 19	Final
AP																				N/A	
Coaches																					

Legend
	Increase in ranking
	Decrease in ranking
	No change
(RV)	Received votes
(NR)	Not ranked

== See also ==
- 2017–18 Creighton Bluejays men's basketball team
