= 2017–18 St. John's Red Storm women's basketball team =

Intercollegiate basketball season

2017–18 St. John's Red Storm women's basketball

WNIT, Quarterfinals
- Conference: Big East Conference
- Record: 19–15 (9–9 Big East)
- Head coach: Joe Tartamella (6th season)
- Assistant coaches: Jonath Nicholas; Da'Shena Stevens; Rory Kuhn
- Home arena: Carnesecca Arena

2017–18 Big East Conference women's basketball standings
	Conf.				Overall
Team	W		L	PCT	W		L	PCT
DePaul †	15	–	3	.833	27	–	8	.771
Marquette	15	–	3	.833	24	–	10	.706
Villanova	12	–	6	.667	23	–	9	.719
Creighton	11	–	7	.611	19	–	13	.594
St. John's	9	–	9	.500	19	–	15	.559
Georgetown	9	–	9	.500	16	–	16	.500
Seton Hall	7	–	11	.389	16	–	16	.500
Butler	6	–	12	.333	15	–	17	.469
Xavier	3	–	15	.167	10	–	20	.333
Providence	3	–	15	.167	10	–	21	.323
† 2018 Big East tournament winner As of 25 March 2018; Rankings from AP poll

The 2017–18 St. John's Red Storm women's basketball team represented St. John's University during the 2017–18 NCAA Division I women's basketball season. The Red Storm, led by sixth-year head coach Joe Tartamella, played their games at Carnesecca Arena and were members of the Big East Conference. They finished the season 19–15, 9–9 in Big East play to finish in a tie for fifth place. They lost in the quarterfinals of the Big East women's basketball tournament to Creighton. They received an automatic bid to the Women's National Invitation Tournament where they defeated Marist, Penn and Duquesne in the first, second and third rounds before losing to West Virginia in the quarterfinals.

== Roster ==
2017–18 St. John's Red Storm women's basketball team
Players
Coaches

Pos.	#	Name	Height	Year	Previous school	Hometown
G	0	Alisha Kebbe	5 ft 10 in (1.78 m)	So	Neumann-Goretti	Philadelphia, PA
G	1	Tamesha Alexander	5 ft 7 in (1.7 m)	Sr	The Shipley School	Philadelphia, PA
G	3	Tiana England	5 ft 7 in (1.7 m)	RS Fr	Stamford	Stamford, CT
G	5	Shamachya Duncan	5 ft 6 in (1.68 m)	So	The Patrick School	Staten Island, NY
F	11	Kayla Charles	6 ft 3 in (1.91 m)	Fr	William Cullen Bryant	Far Rockaway, NY
G	15	Andrayah Adams	5 ft 10 in (1.78 m)	So	Como Park	Minneapolis, MN
G/F	20	Akina Wellere	5 ft 11 in (1.8 m)	Jr	Gwendolyn Brooks College Prep	Chicago, IL
G	21	Qadashah Hoppie	5 ft 7 in (1.7 m)	Fr	The Patrick School	Staten Island, NY
F	25	Curteeona Brelove (redshirt)	6 ft 2 in (1.88 m)	Sr	Malone; VCU	Malone, FL
F	34	Maya Singleton	6 ft 0 in (1.83 m)	Sr	Riverdale Baptist; Trinity Valley CC	Indian Head, MD
F	35	Imani Littleton	6 ft 3 in (1.91 m)	Sr	The Bishop's School	San Diego, CA

Head coach

- Joe Tartamella (James Madison)

Assistant coach(es)

- Jonath Nicholas (Trinity (TX))
- Da'Shena Stevens (St. John's)
- Rory Kuhn (SUNY Cortland)

Legend

- (C) Team captain
- (S) Suspended
- (I) Ineligible
- (W) Walk-on
- Injured
- Current redshirt

Roster

== Schedule ==
Date time, TV	Rank^{#}	Opponent^{#}	Result	Record	Site (attendance) city, state
Exhibition
11/01/2017*; 11:00 am		Stony Brook; Red Cross Disaster Relief Game	W 66–45		Carnesecca Arena (110); Queens, NY
Non-conference regular season
11/10/2017*; 4:30 pm, ESPN3		St. Francis Brooklyn	W 73–49	1–0	Carnesecca Arena; Queens, VA
11/17/2017*; 7:00 pm, ESPN3		William & Mary	W 92–81	2–0	Carnesecca Arena (323); Queens, VA
11/24/2017*; 11:00 am		vs. Western Michigan; Gulf Coast Showcase quarterfinals	W 76–48	3–0	Germain Arena (1,207); Estero, FL
11/25/2017*; 5:00 pm		vs. No. 3 South Carolina; Gulf Coast Showcase semifinals	L 58–76	3–1	Germain Arena; Estero, FL
11/26/2017*; 5:00 pm		vs. No. 17 South Florida; Gulf Coast Showcase 3rd place game	L 59–68	3–2	Germain Arena; Estero, FL
11/30/2017*; 7:00 pm, ESPN3		at Albany	W 71–66	4–2	SEFCU Arena (913); Albany, NY
12/03/2017*; 1:00 pm, ACCN Extra		at Miami (FL)	W 74–64	5–2	Watsco Center (665); Coral Gables, FL
12/09/2017*; 2:00 pm, ESPN3		James Madison	W 81–64	6–2	Carnesecca Arena (809); Queens, NY
12/12/2017*; 7:00 pm, ESPN3		Fordham; Rivalry	W 67–64 ^{2OT}	6–3	Carnesecca Arena (587); Queens, NY
12/18/2017*; 7:00 pm, ESPN3		Kansas	W 65–53 ^{OT}	7–3	Carnesecca Arena (690); Queens, NY
12/21/2017*; 11:00 am, ESPN3		Buffalo	L 72–73	7–4	Carnesecca Arena (5,602); Queens, NY
Big East regular season
12/28/2017; 8:30 pm, FS2		at Marquette	L 72–74 ^{OT}	7–5 (0–1)	Al McGuire Center (1,479); Milwaukee, WI
12/30/2017; 8:00 pm, BEDN		at DePaul	L 67–76	7–6 (0–2)	McGrath-Phillips Arena (1,709); Chicago, IL
01/02/2018; 7:00 pm, BEDN		Providence	L 44–49	7–7 (0–3)	Carnesecca Arena (566); Queens, NY
01/05/2018; 7:00 pm, BEDN		Creighton	W 72–65 ^{OT}	8–7 (1–3)	Carnesecca Arena (538); Queens, NY
01/07/2018; 2:00 pm, BEDN		at Xavier	W 67–63	9–7 (2–3)	Cintas Center (845); Cincinnati, OH
01/10/2018; 7:00 pm, FS2		at Butler	W 73–55	10–7 (3–3)	Hinkle Fieldhouse (401); Indianapolis, IN
01/12/2018; 7:00 pm, BEDN		Georgetown	W 64–41	11–7 (4–3)	Carnesecca Arena (561); Queens, NY
01/14/2018; 2:00 pm, BEDN		Villanova	W 70–64	12–7 (5–3)	Carnesecca Arena (936); Queens, NY
01/21/2018; 1:00 pm, BEDN		at Seton Hall	L 57–62	12–8 (5–4)	Walsh Gymnasium (967); South Orange, NJ
01/26/2018; 8:00 pm, BEDN		at Creighton	L 39–53	12–9 (5–5)	D. J. Sokol Arena (1,316); Omaha, NE
01/28/2018; 1:00 pm, BEDN		at Providence	L 68–70	12–10 (5–6)	Alumni Hall (690); Providence, RI
02/02/2018; 7:00 pm, BEDN		Butler	W 76–38	13–10 (6–6)	Carnesecca Arena (716); Queens, NY
02/04/2018; 2:00 pm, BEDN		Xavier	W 70–36	14–10 (7–6)	Carnesecca Arena; Queens, NY
02/09/2018; 11:30 am, BEDN		at Villanova	L 52–69	14–11 (7–7)	Jake Nevin Field House (1,709); Villanova, PA
02/11/2018; 2:00 pm, BEDN		at Georgetown	W 71–63	15–11 (8–7)	McDonough Gymnasium (1,133); Washington, D.C.
02/16/2018; 7:00 pm, FS2		Seton Hall	W 75–56	16–11 (9–7)	Carnesecca Arena (755); Queens, NY
02/23/2018; 7:00 pm, BEDN		DePaul	L 54–67	16–12 (9–8)	Carnesecca Arena (749); Queens, NY
02/25/2018; 2:00 pm, BEDN		Marquette	L 57–76	16–13 (9–9)	Carnesecca Arena (1,069); Queens, NY
Big East Women's Tournament
03/04/2018; 3:30 pm, FS2	(5)	vs. (4) Creighton; Quarterfinals	L 58–66	16–14	Wintrust Arena (1,991); Chicago, IL
WNIT
03/15/2018*; 7:00 pm, ESPN3		Marist; First Round	W 68–47	17–14	Carnesecca Arena (694); Queens, NY
03/19/2018*; 7:00 pm, ESPN3		Penn; Second Round	W 53–48	18–14	Carnesecca Arena (478); Queens, NY
03/22/2018*; 7:00 pm		Duquesne; Third Round	W 65–52	19–14	Carnesecca Arena (335); Queens, NY
03/25/2018*; 4:00 pm		at West Virginia; Quarterfinals	L 62–76	19–15	WVU Coliseum (2,280); Morgantown, WV
*Non-conference game. ^{#}Rankings from AP Poll. (#) Tournament seedings in parentheses. All times are in Eastern Time.

== See also ==
- 2017–18 St. John's Red Storm men's basketball team
