= 2017–18 DePaul Blue Demons women's basketball team =

Intercollegiate basketball season

2017–18 DePaul Blue Demons women's basketball
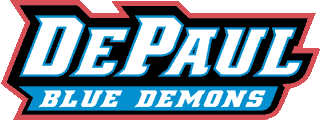

Maggie Dixon Classic champions Big East regular season co-champions & Tournament Champions

NCAA Women's Tournament, second round
- Conference: Big East Conference

Ranking
- Coaches: No. 23
- Record: 27–8 (15–3 Big East)
- Head coach: Doug Bruno (32nd season)
- Assistant coaches: Jill M. Pizzotti; Lisa Ryckbosch; Jasmine Lister
- Home arena: Wintrust Arena; McGrath-Phillips Arena

2017–18 Big East Conference women's basketball standings
	Conf.				Overall
Team	W		L	PCT	W		L	PCT
DePaul †	15	–	3	.833	27	–	8	.771
Marquette	15	–	3	.833	24	–	10	.706
Villanova	12	–	6	.667	23	–	9	.719
Creighton	11	–	7	.611	19	–	13	.594
St. John's	9	–	9	.500	19	–	15	.559
Georgetown	9	–	9	.500	16	–	16	.500
Seton Hall	7	–	11	.389	16	–	16	.500
Butler	6	–	12	.333	15	–	17	.469
Xavier	3	–	15	.167	10	–	20	.333
Providence	3	–	15	.167	10	–	21	.323
† 2018 Big East tournament winner As of 25 March 2018; Rankings from AP poll

The 2017–18 DePaul Blue Demons women's basketball team represented DePaul University during the 2017–18 NCAA Division I women's basketball season. The Blue Demons, led by thirty-second year head coach Doug Bruno, played their home games at the Wintrust Arena. They were members of the Big East Conference. They finished the season 27–8, 15–3 in Big East play to share the Big East regular season title with Marquette. They won the Big East women's tournament by defeating Marquette in the championship game. They received an automatic bid to the NCAA women's tournament, where they defeated Oklahoma in the first round before losing to Texas A&M in the second round.

This was the Blue Demons' first season at the new Wintrust Arena at the McCormick Place convention center. The arena is also the new home to the DePaul men's team.

== Roster ==
2017–18 DePaul Blue Demons women's basketball team
Players
Coaches

Pos.	#	Name	Height	Year	Previous school	Hometown
G	1	Ashton Millender	5 ft 8 in (1.73 m)	Jr	Marian Catholic	Glenwood, IL
G	3	Vinisha Sherrod	5 ft 9 in (1.75 m)	Fr	Bradley-Bourbonnais	Bourbonnais, IL
G	5	Lauren Prochaska	5 ft 8 in (1.73 m)	Sr	Trinity	Chicago, IL
G	10	Amarah Coleman	5 ft 11 in (1.8 m)	Sr	Homewood-Flossmoor	Bolingbrook, IL
G	11	Rebekah Dahlman	5 ft 9 in (1.75 m)	RS Sr	Braham Area; Vanderbilt	Braham, MN
G/F	14	Rachel McLimore	5 ft 10 in (1.78 m)	Fr	Zionsville	Zionsville, IN
G	15	Jolene Daninger	5 ft 7 in (1.7 m)	Fr	Andover	Andover, MN
G	20	Kelly Campbell	5 ft 10 in (1.78 m)	So	Saint John Vianney	Wall, NJ
F	22	Chante Stonewall	6 ft 1 in (1.85 m)	So	University	Normal, IL
G	23	Dee Bekelja	5 ft 8 in (1.73 m)	Fr	Solon	Solon, OH
G	24	Tanita Allen	5 ft 10 in (1.78 m)	Jr	Whitney Young	Chicago, IL
G	31	Deja Cage	5 ft 8 in (1.73 m)	So	Morgan Park	Chicago, IL
F	33	Claire McMahon	6 ft 1 in (1.85 m)	So	Lincoln Way East	Frankfort, IL
F	35	Mart'e Grays	6 ft 2 in (1.88 m)	Jr	Martin Luther King Jr.	Detroit, MI

Head coach

- Doug Bruno (DePaul)

Assistant coach(es)

- Jill M. Pizzotti (Southeast Missouri State)
- Lisa Ryckbosch (Georgetown)
- Jasmine Lister (Vanderbilt)

Legend

- (C) Team captain
- (S) Suspended
- (I) Ineligible
- (W) Walk-on
- Injured
- Current redshirt

Roster

== Schedule ==
Date time, TV	Rank^{#}	Opponent^{#}	Result	Record	Site (attendance) city, state
Exhibition
11/05/2017*; 5:30 pm	No. 25	Saint Xavier	W 128–77	–	Wintrust Arena (4,751); Chicago, IL
Non-conference regular season
11/10/2017*; 7:00 pm	No. 25	Northern Colorado	L 88–94	0–1	McGrath-Phillips Arena (1,665); Chicago, IL
11/13/2017*; 7:00 pm		No. 21 Oklahoma	W 111–108 ^{OT}	1–1	McGrath-Phillips Arena (2,072); Chicago, IL
11/17/2017*; 6:30 pm		Delaware State; Maggie Dixon Classic semifinals	W 110–71	2–1	Wintrust Arena (1,692); Chicago, IL
11/18/2017*; 4:00 pm		Saint Louis; Maggie Dixon Classic championship	W 86–78	3–1	Wintrust Arena (1,964); Chicago, IL
11/23/2017*; 2:30 pm		vs. Florida Gulf Coast; Play4Kay Showcase Quarterfinals	L 84–89 ^{OT}	3–2	Mandalay Bay Arena; Las Vegas, NV
11/24/2017*; 2:30 pm		vs. Memphis; Play4Kay Showcase consolation 2nd round	W 81–67	4–2	Mandalay Bay Arena; Las Vegas, NV
11/25/2017*; 5:00 pm		vs. Gonzaga; Play4Kay Showcase 5th place game	W 88–71	5–2	Mandalay Bay Arena; Las Vegas, NV
12/04/2017*; 11:00 am		Loyola–Chicago	W 88–47	6–2	Wintrust Arena (5,152); Chicago, IL
12/08/2017*; 6:00 pm, FS1		No. 1 Connecticut	L 69–103	6–3	Wintrust Arena (3,229); Chicago, IL
12/13/2017*; 7:00 pm, BTN Plus		at Northwestern	W 92–63	7–3	Beardsley Gym (636); Evanston, IL
12/17/2017*; 12:00 pm, ACCN Extra		at No. 2 Notre Dame	L 82–91	7–4	Edmund P. Joyce Center (8,503); South Bend, IN
12/20/2017*; 7:00 pm		IUPUI	W 85–71	8–4	McGrath-Phillips Arena (1,746); Chicago, IL
Conference regular season
12/28/2017; 7:00 pm, BEDN		Seton Hall	W 89–66	9–4 (1–0)	McGrath-Phillips Arena (1,832); Chicago, IL
12/30/2017; 7:00 pm, BEDN/NBCSCH		St. John's	W 76–67	10–4 (2–0)	McGrath-Phillips Arena (1,709); Chicago, IL
01/04/2018; 7:00 pm, BEDN/NBCSCH		at Marquette	L 81–93	10–5 (2–1)	Al McGuire Center (1,626); Milwaukee, WI
01/07/2018; 12:00 pm, BEDN		at Providence	W 71–48	11–5 (3–1)	Alumni Hall (326); Providence, RI
01/10/2018; 7:00 pm, BEDN		at Creighton	W 82–54	12–5 (4–1)	D. J. Sokol Arena (672); Omaha, NE
01/12/2018; 4:30 pm, BEDN/NBCSCH		Xavier	W 79–48	13–5 (5–1)	Wintrust Arena (5,354); Chicago, IL
01/14/2018; 3:30 pm, CBSSN		Butler	W 87–65	14–5 (6–1)	Wintrust Arena (1,979); Chicago, IL
01/19/2018; 6:00 pm, BEDN		at Villanova	L 58–84	14–6 (6–2)	Jake Nevin Field House (641); Villanova, PA
01/21/2018; 1:00 pm, CBSSN		at Georgetown	W 78–62	15–6 (7–2)	McDonough Gymnasium (1,191); Washington, D.C.
01/29/2018; 8:00 pm, FS1		Marquette	W 95–83	16–6 (8–2)	McGrath-Phillips Arena (2,381); Chicago, IL
02/02/2018; 7:00 pm, BEDN/NBCSCH		Creighton	W 77–67	17–6 (9–2)	McGrath-Phillips Arena (1,828); Chicago, IL
02/04/2018; 2:00 pm, BEDN/NBCSCH		Providence	W 81–47	18–6 (10–2)	McGrath-Phillips Arena (2,235); Chicago, IL
02/09/2018; 6:00 pm, BEDN		at Butler	W 86–68	19–6 (11–2)	Hinkle Fieldhouse (1,047); Indianapolis, IN
02/11/2018; 1:00 pm, BEDN		at Xavier	W 73–72	20–6 (12–2)	Cintas Center (1,107); Cincinnati, OH
02/16/2018; 7:00 pm, BEDN/NBCSCH		Georgetown	L 85–86	20–7 (12–3)	McGrath-Phillips Arena (1,890); Chicago, IL
02/18/2018; 2:00 pm, FS1		Villanova	W 71–66	21–7 (13–3)	McGrath-Phillips Arena (2,182); Chicago, IL
02/23/2018; 6:00 pm, BEDN		at St. John's	W 67–54	22–7 (14–3)	Carnesecca Arena (749); Queens, NY
02/25/2018; 12:00 pm, BEDN		at Seton Hall	W 72–68	23–7 (15–3)	Walsh Gymnasium (1,013); South Orange, NJ
Big East Women's Tournament
03/04/2018; 6:00 pm, FS2	(2)	vs. (7) Seton Hall; Quarterfinals	W 78–52	24–7	Wintrust Arena; Chicago, IL
03/05/2018; 5:30 pm, FS1	(2)	vs. (6) Georgetown; Semifinals	W 85–53	25–7	Wintrust Arena (2,192); Chicago, IL
03/06/2018; 6:00 pm, FS1	(2)	vs. (1) Marquette; Championship Game	W 98–63	26–7	Wintrust Arena (2,264); Chicago, IL
NCAA Women's Tournament
03/16/2018*; 11:00 am, ESPN2	(5 S)	vs. (12 S) Oklahoma; First Round	W 90–79	27–7	Reed Arena; College Station, TX
03/18/2018*; 1:00 pm, ESPN2	(5 S)	at (4 S) No. 14 Texas A&M; Second Round	L 79–80	27–8	Reed Arena (3,162); College Station, TX
*Non-conference game. ^{#}Rankings from AP Poll. (#) Tournament seedings in parentheses. S=Spokane Region. All times are in Central Time.

== Rankings ==
2017–18 NCAA Division I women's basketball rankings

Regular season polls
Poll	Pre- season	Week 2	Week 3	Week 4	Week 5	Week 6	Week 7	Week 8	Week 9	Week 10	Week 11	Week 12	Week 13	Week 14	Week 15	Week 16	Week 17	Week 18	Week 19	Final
AP	25	RV	RV	RV	RV	NR	RV	RV	RV	NR	NR	NR	NR	RV	RV	NR	RV	RV	NR	N/A
Coaches	20	21	21	RV	RV	RV	RV	RV	RV	RV	RV	RV	RV	RV	24	RV	RV	24	23	23

Legend
	Increase in ranking
	Decrease in ranking
	No change
(RV)	Received votes
(NR)	Not ranked
