= 2017–18 Butler Bulldogs women's basketball team =

Intercollegiate basketball season

2017–18 Butler Bulldogs women's basketball
- Conference: Big East
- Record: 15–17 (6–12 Big East)
- Head coach: Kurt Godlevske (4th season)
- Assistant coaches: John Marcum; Kierra McCleary; Gabe Henry
- Home arena: Hinkle Fieldhouse

2017–18 Big East Conference women's basketball standings
| | Conf. | | | | Overall |
| Team | W | | L | PCT | W | | L | PCT |
|---|---|---|---|---|---|---|---|---|
| DePaul † | 15 | – | 3 | .833 | 27 | – | 8 | .771 |
| Marquette | 15 | – | 3 | .833 | 24 | – | 10 | .706 |
| Villanova | 12 | – | 6 | .667 | 23 | – | 9 | .719 |
| Creighton | 11 | – | 7 | .611 | 19 | – | 13 | .594 |
| St. John's | 9 | – | 9 | .500 | 19 | – | 15 | .559 |
| Georgetown | 9 | – | 9 | .500 | 16 | – | 16 | .500 |
| Seton Hall | 7 | – | 11 | .389 | 16 | – | 16 | .500 |
| Butler | 6 | – | 12 | .333 | 15 | – | 17 | .469 |
| Xavier | 3 | – | 15 | .167 | 10 | – | 20 | .333 |
| Providence | 3 | – | 15 | .167 | 10 | – | 21 | .323 |
† 2018 Big East tournament winner As of 25 March 2018; Rankings from AP poll

The 2017–18 Butler Bulldogs women's basketball team represented Butler University in the 2017–18 NCAA Division I women's basketball season. The Bulldogs, led by fourth year head coach Kurt Godlevske, played their home games at Hinkle Fieldhouse and were members of the Big East Conference. They finished the season 15–17, 6–12 in Big East play to finish in eighth place. They advanced to the quarterfinals of the Big East women's tournament, where they lost to Marquette.

== Previous season ==
They finished the season 6–25, 2–16 in Big East play to finish in last place. They advanced to the quarterfinals of the Big East women's tournament where they lost to Creighton.

== Roster ==
2017–18 Butler Bulldogs women's basketball team
Players
Coaches

| Pos. | # | Name | Height | Year | Previous school | Hometown |
|---|---|---|---|---|---|---|
| F | 2 | Kaela Hodges | 6 ft 0 in (1.83 m) | Sr | Pontiac Township; Wabash Valley | Odell, IL |
| G/F | 3 | Alisha Aube | 6 ft 0 in (1.83 m) | Fr | Thornton Academy | Westbrook, ME |
| G | 4 | Taylor Buford | 5 ft 11 in (1.8 m) | Jr | Adlai Stevenson | Long Grove, IL |
| F | 10 | Naira Caceres (redshirt) | 6 ft 1 in (1.85 m) | So | Colegio Manuel Peleteiro; Maine | Las Palmas de Gran Canaria, Spain |
| G | 11 | Michelle Weaver | 5 ft 7 in (1.7 m) | Jr | Saint Joseph | South Bend, IN |
| G | 12 | Sydney Buck | 5 ft 7 in (1.7 m) | Sr | Homestead | Fort Wayne, IN |
| G | 14 | Sarah Humphrey | 6 ft 0 in (1.83 m) | So | Crete-Monee | Crete, IL |
| G | 15 | Whitney Jennings | 5 ft 5 in (1.65 m) | RS Jr | Logansport; Iowa | Logansport, IN |
| G | 21 | Katherine Strong (redshirt) | 5 ft 11 in (1.8 m) | Jr | Bloom; VCU | Chicago Heights, IL |
| G | 22 | Iman Lathan | 5 ft 9 in (1.75 m) | RS Sr | Perris; Cal State Fullerton | Temecula, CA |
| G/F | 23 | Shae Brey | 6 ft 0 in (1.83 m) | So | Eau Claire Regis | Altoona, WI |
| G | 24 | Kristen Spolyar | 5 ft 10 in (1.78 m) | So | Lebanon | Lebanon, IN |
| C | 32 | Ashanti Thomas (redshirt) | 6 ft 4 in (1.93 m) | Jr | Lafayette; Penn State | Lexington, KY |
| F | 34 | Tori Schickel | 6 ft 1 in (1.85 m) | Jr | Mater Dei | Evansville, IN |

Head coach

- Kurt Godlevske (Northern Michigan)

Assistant coach(es)

- John Marcum (East Central)
- Kierra McCleary (North Alabama)
- Gabe Henry (Missouri Valley)

Legend

- (C) Team captain
- (S) Suspended
- (I) Ineligible
- (W) Walk-on
- Injured
- Current redshirt

Roster
Last update: February 23, 2018

== Schedule ==
| Date time, TV | Rank^{#} | Opponent^{#} | Result | Record | Site (attendance) city, state |
Non-conference regular season
| 11/11/2017*; 7:00 pm | | Austin Peay | W 75–54 | 1–0 | Hinkle Fieldhouse (883); Indianapolis, IN |
| 11/15/2017*; 12:00 pm | | at Murray State | W 88–59 | 2–0 | CFSB Center (494); Murray, KY |
| 11/17/2017*; 7:00 pm | | Lipscomb | W 70–58 | 3–0 | Hinkle Fieldhouse (506); Indianapolis, IN |
| 11/20/2017*; 7:00 pm | | at No. 17 South Florida | L 55–71 | 3–1 | USF Sun Dome (2,223); Tampa, FL |
| 11/23/2017*; 3:30 pm | | vs. No. 11 West Virginia; Paradise Jam Tournament Island Division | L 68–75 | 3–2 | Titan Field House; Melbourne, FL |
| 11/24/2017*; 6:00 pm | | vs. Virginia Tech; Paradise Jam Tournament Island Division | W 79–77 | 4–2 | Titan Field House (369); Melbourne, FL |
| 11/25/2017*; 3:30 pm | | vs. Drexel; Paradise Jam Tournament Island Division | L 62–76 | 4–3 | Titan Field House (276); Melbourne, FL |
| 11/29/2017*; 7:00 pm, ESPN3 | | at Ball State | L 75–87 | 4–4 | Worthen Arena (1,564); Muncie, IN |
| 12/02/2017*; 3:00 pm, ESPN3 | | at Illinois State | W 56–45 | 5–4 | Redbird Arena (613); Normal, IL |
| 12/08/2017*; 7:00 pm | | Wisconsin | W 69–62 | 6–4 | Hinkle Fieldhouse (869); Indianapolis, IN |
| 12/18/2017*; 7:00 pm | | Loyola–Chicago | W 64–52 | 7–4 | Hinkle Fieldhouse (427); Indianapolis, IN |
| 12/21/2017*; 7:00 pm, ESPN3 | | at Indiana State | W 60–51 | 8–4 | Hulman Center (1,277); Terre Haute, IN |
Big East Conference Play
| 12/29/2017; 7:00 pm, FS2 | | Xavier | L 62–69 | 8–5 (0–1) | Hinkle Fieldhouse (799); Indianapolis, IN |
| 01/02/2017; 7:00 pm, BEDN | | at No. 21 Villanova | W 76–53 | 9–5 (1–1) | Jake Nevin Field House (404); Villanova, PA |
| 01/05/2018; 7:00 pm, BEDN | | at Georgetown | W 66–57 | 10–5 (2–1) | McDonough Gymnasium (297); Washington, D.C. |
| 01/07/2018; 1:00 pm, BEDN | | Seton Hall | W 66–48 | 11–5 (3–1) | Hinkle Fieldhouse (543); Indianapolis, IN |
| 01/10/2018; 7:00 pm, FS2 | | St. John's | L 55–73 | 11–6 (3–2) | Hinkle Fieldhouse (401); Indianapolis, IN |
| 01/12/2018; 8:00 pm, BEDN | | at Marquette | L 67–69 | 11–7 (3–3) | Al McGuire Center (1,707); Milwaukee, WI |
| 01/14/2018; 4:30 pm, CBSSN | | at DePaul | L 65–87 | 11–8 (3–4) | Wintrust Arena (1,979); Chicago, IL |
| 01/19/2018; 7:00 pm, BEDN | | Creighton | W 59–53 | 12–8 (4–4) | Hinkle Fieldhouse (922); Indianapolis, IN |
| 01/21/2018; 1:00 pm, BEDN | | Providence | W 68–57 | 13–8 (5–4) | Hinkle Fieldhouse (862); Indianapolis, IN |
| 01/26/2017; 7:00 pm, BEDN | | at Georgetown | L 52–63 | 13–9 (5–5) | Hinkle Fieldhouse (773); Indianapolis, IN |
| 01/28/2017; 1:00 pm, BEDN | | at Villanova | L 67–69 | 13–10 (5–6) | Hinkle Fieldhouse (736); Indianapolis, IN |
| 02/02/2018; 7:00 pm, BEDN | | at St. John's | L 38–76 | 13–11 (5–7) | Carnesecca Arena (716); Queens, NY |
| 02/04/2017; 1:00 pm, BEDN | | at Seton Hall | L 64–75 | 13–12 (5–8) | Walsh Gymnasium (1,655); South Orange, NJ |
| 02/09/2018; 7:00 pm, BEDN | | DePaul | L 65–87 | 13–13 (5–9) | Hinkle Fieldhouse (1,047); Indianapolis, IN |
| 02/11/2018; 1:00 pm, BEDN | | Marquette | L 59–78 | 13–14 (5–10) | Hinkle Fieldhouse (1,317); Indianapolis, IN |
| 02/16/2018; 7:00 pm, BEDN | | at Providence | W 69–48 | 14–14 (6–10) | Alumni Hall (463); Providence, RI |
| 02/18/2018; 2:00 pm, BEDN | | at Creighton | L 55–64 | 14–15 (6–11) | D. J. Sokol Arena (1,261); Omaha, NE |
| 02/25/2018; 7:00 pm, BEDN | | at Xavier | L 54–57 | 14–16 (6–12) | Cintas Center (1,776); Cincinnati, OH |
Big East Women's Tournament
| 03/03/2018; 5:00 pm, BEDN | (8) | vs. (9) Providence; First Round | W 73–67 ^{OT} | 15–16 | Wintrust Arena; Chicago, IL |
| 03/04/2018; 1:00 pm, BEDN | (8) | vs. (2) Marquette; Quarterfinals | L 61–73 | 15–17 | Wintrust Arena; Chicago, IL |
*Non-conference game. ^{#}Rankings from AP Poll. (#) Tournament seedings in parentheses. All times are in Eastern BEDN=Big East Digital Network.

== See also ==
2017–18 Butler Bulldogs men's basketball team
