= 2017–18 Villanova Wildcats women's basketball team =

Intercollegiate basketball season

2017–18 Villanova Wildcats women's basketball

TD Bank Classic Champions

NCAA Women's Tournament, second round
- Conference: Big East Conference
- Record: 23–9 (12–6 Big East)
- Head coach: Harry Perretta (40th season)
- Assistant coaches: Joe Mullaney; Laura Kurz; Shanette Lee
- Home arena: Jake Nevin Field House

2017–18 Big East Conference women's basketball standings
	Conf.				Overall
Team	W		L	PCT	W		L	PCT
DePaul †	15	–	3	.833	27	–	8	.771
Marquette	15	–	3	.833	24	–	10	.706
Villanova	12	–	6	.667	23	–	9	.719
Creighton	11	–	7	.611	19	–	13	.594
St. John's	9	–	9	.500	19	–	15	.559
Georgetown	9	–	9	.500	16	–	16	.500
Seton Hall	7	–	11	.389	16	–	16	.500
Butler	6	–	12	.333	15	–	17	.469
Xavier	3	–	15	.167	10	–	20	.333
Providence	3	–	15	.167	10	–	21	.323
† 2018 Big East tournament winner As of 25 March 2018; Rankings from AP poll

The 2017–18 Villanova Wildcats women's basketball team represented Villanova University in the 2017–18 NCAA Division I women's basketball season. The Wildcats, led by fortieth-year head coach Harry Perretta, played their games at Jake Nevin Field House due to renovations at The Pavilion, and were members of the Big East Conference. They finished the season 23–9, 12–6 in Big East play to finish in third place. They lost in the quarterfinals of the Big East women's tournament to Georgetown. They received an at-large bid to the NCAA women's tournament, where they defeated South Dakota State in the first round before losing to Notre Dame in the second round.

== Previous season ==
They finished the season 20–15, 11–7 in Big East play to finish in a tie for fourth place. They lost in the quarterfinals of the Big East women's tournament to St. John's. They were invited to the Women's National Invitation Tournament, where they defeated Princeton, Drexel and James Madison in the first, second and third rounds, and Indiana in the quarterfinals, before losing to Michigan in the semifinals.

== Roster ==
2017–18 Villanova Wildcats women's basketball team
Players
Coaches

Pos.	#	Name	Height	Year	Previous school	Hometown
G	0	Cameron Onken	5 ft 10 in (1.78 m)	RS Fr	Lafayette Central Catholic	Lafayette, IN
F	1	Bridget Herlihy	6 ft 2 in (1.88 m)	RS So	Braintree	Braintree, MA
G	2	Alex Louin (W)	6 ft 0 in (1.83 m)	Sr	Mount St. Joseph Academy	Doylestown, PA
F	3	Grace Lange	5 ft 11 in (1.8 m)	Fr	Caravel Academy	Newark, DE
G	10	Raven James	5 ft 6 in (1.68 m)	RS Fr	St. Paul VI	Upper Marlboro, MD
C	12	Megan Quinn	6 ft 2 in (1.88 m)	Sr	Episcopal Academy	Berwyn, PA
G	13	Samantha Carangi	5 ft 9 in (1.75 m)	Fr	North Penn	Lansdale, PA
F	14	Brianna Herlihy	6 ft 0 in (1.83 m)	RS Fr	Braintree	Braintree, MA
G/F	21	Jannah Tucker	6 ft 0 in (1.83 m)	Jr	New Town	Baltimore, MD
G	23	Emily Esposito	5 ft 9 in (1.75 m)	Fr	Gorham	Gorham, ME
G	24	Nicolette Juliana	5 ft 8 in (1.73 m)	Sr	Bishop Shanahan	West Chester, PA
G	25	Kelly Jekot	6 ft 0 in (1.83 m)	So	Cumberland Valley	Enola, PA
F	30	Mary Gedaka	6 ft 1 in (1.85 m)	So	Gloucester Catholic	Mullica Hill, NJ
G	31	Adrianna Hahn	5 ft 6 in (1.68 m)	Jr	Ursuline Academy	Wilmington, DE
G	45	Grace Stant	6 ft 0 in (1.83 m)	RS Jr	Rumson Fair Haven	Fair Haven, NJ

Head coach

- Harry Perretta (Lycoming)

Assistant coach(es)

- Joe Mullaney (Providence)
- Laura Kurz (Villanova)
- Shanette Lee (Villanova)

Legend

- (C) Team captain
- (S) Suspended
- (I) Ineligible
- (W) Walk-on
- Injured
- Current redshirt

Roster
Last update: February 21, 2018

== Schedule ==
Date time, TV	Rank^{#}	Opponent^{#}	Result	Record	Site (attendance) city, state
Exhibition
11/01/2017*; 6:00 pm		East Stroudsburg	W 109–42		Jake Nevin Field House; Villanova, PA
Regular season
11/10/2017*; 5:30 pm		at Hartford	W 71–53	1–0	Chase Arena at Reich Family Pavilion; West Hartford, CT
11/17/2017*; 5:00 pm		vs. Lehigh	W 62–42	2–0	PPL Center (6,651); Allentown, PA
11/19/2017*; 1:00 pm		No. 11 Duke	W 64–55	3–0	Jake Nevin Field House (1,421); Villanova, PA
11/24/2017*; 7:00 pm		vs. James Madison; TD Bank Classic semifinals	W 60–57	4–0	Patrick Gym (906); Burlington, VT
11/25/2017*; 7:00 pm, ESPN3		vs. American; TD Bank Classic championship	W 65–60	5–0	Patrick Gym (406); Burlington, VT
11/29/2017*; 5:30 pm	No. 25	at Princeton	W 62–59	6–0	Jadwin Gymnasium (525); Princeton, NJ
12/03/2017*; 7:00 pm	No. 25	Saint Joseph's; Holy War	W 79–44	7–0	Jake Nevin Field House (1,519); Villanova, PA
12/06/2017*; 7:00 pm	No. 22	at Fairfield	W 73–44	8–0	Alumni Hall (521); Fairfield, CT
12/10/2017*; 2:00 pm	No. 22	at Temple	W 69–65	9–0	McGonigle Hall (1,184); Philadelphia, PA
12/28/2017; 8:00 pm, BEDN	No. 18	at Creighton	L 54–69	10–1 (0–1)	D. J. Sokol Arena (1,120); Omaha, NE
12/30/2017; 1:00 pm, BEDN	No. 18	at Providence	W 63–55	11–1 (1–1)	Alumni Hall (528); Providence, RI
01/02/2018; 7:00 pm, BEDN	No. 21	Butler	L 53–76	11–2 (1–2)	Jake Nevin Field House (401); Villanova, PA
01/05/2018; 7:00 pm, BEDN	No. 21	Xavier	W 75–57	12–2 (2–2)	Jake Nevin Field House (541); Villanova, PA
01/10/2018; 7:00 pm, BEDN		at Georgetown	W 60–58	13–2 (3–2)	McDonough Gymnasium (827); Washington, D.C.
01/12/2018; 7:00 pm, BEDN		at Seton Hall	W 67–59	14–2 (4–2)	Walsh Gymnasium (881); South Orange, NJ
01/14/2018; 2:00 pm, BEDN		at St. John's	L 64–70	14–3 (4–3)	Carnesecca Arena (936); Queens, NY
01/17/2018*; 7:00 pm		Penn	L 77–79	14–4	Jake Nevin Field House (519); Villanova, PA
01/19/2018; 7:00 pm, BEDN		DePaul	W 84–58	15–4 (5–3)	Jake Nevin Field House (641); Villanova, PA
01/21/2018; 12:00 pm, FS1		Marquette	L 57–67	15–5 (5–4)	Jake Nevin Field House (701); Villanova, PA
01/26/2018; 7:00 pm, BEDN		at Xavier	W 89–50	16–5 (6–4)	Cintas Center (1,135); Cincinnati, OH
01/28/2018; 1:00 pm, BEDN		at Butler	W 69–67	17–5 (7–4)	Hinkle Fieldhouse (736); Indianapolis, IN
02/03/2018; 1:00 pm, BEDN		Georgetown	W 68–67	18–5 (8–4)	Jake Nevin Field House (1,209); Villanova, PA
02/09/2018; 11:30 am, BEDN		St. John's	W 69–52	19–5 (9–4)	Jake Nevin Field House (1,709); Villanova, PA
02/11/2018; 2:00 pm, FS2		Seton Hall	W 59–53	20–5 (10–4)	Jake Nevin Field House (1,003); Villanova, PA
02/16/2018; 12:30 pm, BEDN		at Marquette	L 69–90	20–6 (10–5)	Al McGuire Center (2,438); Milwaukee, WI
02/18/2018; 3:00 pm, FS1		at DePaul	L 66–71	20–7 (10–6)	McGrath-Phillips Arena (2,182); Chicago, IL
02/23/2018*; 7:00 pm, BEDN		Providence	W 70–43	21–7 (11–6)	Jake Nevin Field House (541); Villanova, PA
02/25/2018; 2:00 pm, FS1		Creighton	W 55–48	22–7 (12–6)	Jake Nevin Field House (801); Villanova, PA
Big East Women's Tournament
03/04/2018; 9:30 pm, FS2	(3)	vs. (6) Georgetown; Quarterfinals	L 58–63	22–8	Wintrust Arena (2,147); Chicago, IL
NCAA Women's Tournament
03/16/2018*; 7:30 pm, ESPN2	(8 S)	vs. (9 S) South Dakota State; First Round	W 81–74 ^{OT}	23–8	Edmund P. Joyce Center (4,431); South Bend, IN
03/18/2018*; 7:00 pm, ESPN	(8 S)	at (1 S) No. 5 Notre Dame; Second Round	L 72–98	23–9	Edmund P. Joyce Center (4,249); South Bend, IN
*Non-conference game. ^{#}Rankings from AP Poll. (#) Tournament seedings in parentheses. S=Spokane Region. All times are in Eastern Time.

== Rankings ==
Regular season polls
Poll	Pre- season	Week 2	Week 3	Week 4	Week 5	Week 6	Week 7	Week 8	Week 9	Week 10	Week 11	Week 12	Week 13	Week 14	Week 15	Week 16	Week 17	Week 18	Week 19	Final
AP	NR	NR	RV	25	22	20	20	18	21	RV	RV	NR	NR	NR	RV	NR	NR	NR	NR	N/A
Coaches	RV	N/A	RV	24	20	19	18	18	21	RV	RV	RV	NR	NR	RV	NR	NR	NR	NR	RV

Legend
	Increase in ranking
	Decrease in ranking
	Not ranked previous week
(RV)	Received votes

== See also ==
- 2017–18 Villanova Wildcats men's basketball team
