= 2018 Big East women's basketball tournament =

- Classification: Division I
- Season: 2017–18
- Teams: 10
- Site: Wintrust Arena; Chicago, IL
- Champions: DePaul (3rd title)
- Winning coach: Doug Bruno (3rd title)
- MVP: Amarah Coleman (DePaul)
- Attendance: 10,544
- Television: FS1, FS2, BEDN

2017–18 Big East Conference women's basketball standings
	Conf.				Overall
Team	W		L	PCT	W		L	PCT
DePaul †	15	–	3	.833	27	–	8	.771
Marquette	15	–	3	.833	24	–	10	.706
Villanova	12	–	6	.667	23	–	9	.719
Creighton	11	–	7	.611	19	–	13	.594
St. John's	9	–	9	.500	19	–	15	.559
Georgetown	9	–	9	.500	16	–	16	.500
Seton Hall	7	–	11	.389	16	–	16	.500
Butler	6	–	12	.333	15	–	17	.469
Xavier	3	–	15	.167	10	–	20	.333
Providence	3	–	15	.167	10	–	21	.323
† 2018 Big East tournament winner As of 25 March 2018; Rankings from AP poll

The 2018 Big East women's basketball tournament ended the 2017–18 season of Big East Conference women's basketball. The event was held March 3–6, 2018, at Wintrust Arena in Chicago. Big East regular-season co-champion and tournament host DePaul won the tournament and with it the Big East's automatic bid to the 2018 NCAA Division I women's basketball tournament.

== Seeds ==
2018 Big East women's basketball tournament seeds and results
Seed	School	Conf.	Over.	Tiebreaker
1	Marquette	15–3	21–8	1-1 vs DePaul, 2-0 vs. Villanova
2	DePaul	15-3	23–7	1-1 vs Marquette, 1-1 vs. Villanova
3	Villanova	12–6	22–7	
4	Creighton	11–7	17–11	
5	St. John's	9-9	16–13	2-0 vs. Georgetown
6	Georgetown	9-9	14-14	0-2 vs. St. John's
7	Seton Hall	7–11	15–14	
8	Butler	6–12	14–16	
9	Providence	3–15	10–20	1-1 vs. Xavier, 0-2 vs. Marquette, 0-2 vs. DePaul, 0-2 vs. Villanova, 0-2 vs. Creighton, 2-0 vs. St. John's
10	Xavier	3–15	10–19	1-1 vs. Providence, 0-2 vs. Marquette, 0-2 vs. DePaul, 0-2 vs. Villanova, 0-2 vs. Creighton, 0-2 vs. St. John's
‡ – Big East regular season champions, and tournament No. 1 seed. † – Received a single-bye in the conference tournament. Overall records include all games played in the Big East tournament.

== Schedule ==
Game	Time*	Matchup^{#}	Television	Attendance
First round – Saturday, March 3
1	4:00 PM	#9 Providence vs. #8 Butler	BEDN	1,950
2	6:30 PM	#10 Xavier vs. #7 Seton Hall	BEDN	1,950
Quarterfinals – Sunday, March 4
3	12:00 PM	#1 Marquette vs. #8 Butler	FS2	1,991
4	2:30 PM	#4 Creighton vs. #5 St John's	FS2	1,991
5	6:00 PM	#2 DePaul vs. #7 Seton Hall	FS2	2,147
6	8:30 PM	#3 Villanova vs. #6 Georgetown	FS2	2,147
Semifinals – Monday, March 5
7	3:00 PM	#1 Marquette vs. #4 Creighton	FS1	2,192
8	5:30 PM	#2 DePaul vs. #6 Georgetown	FS1	2,192
Championship – Tuesday, March 6
9	6:00 PM	#1 Marquette vs. #2 DePaul	FS1	2,264
*Game Times in CT. #-Rankings denote tournament seed

== Bracket ==
First round March 3
8	Butler	73*
9	Providence	67
7	Seton Hall	66
10	Xavier	42

Quarterfinals; March 4
1	Marquette	73
8	Butler	61
4	Creighton	66
5	St. John's	58
2	DePaul	78
7	Seton Hall	52
3	Villanova	58
6	Georgetown	63

Semifinals; March 5
1	Marquette	76
4	Creighton	70
2	DePaul	85
6	Georgetown	53

Championship; March 6
1	Marquette	63
2	DePaul	98

* denotes overtime period

== See also ==
- 2018 Big East men's basketball tournament
