= 2017–18 Marquette Golden Eagles women's basketball team =

Intercollegiate basketball season

2017–18 Marquette Golden Eagles women's basketball
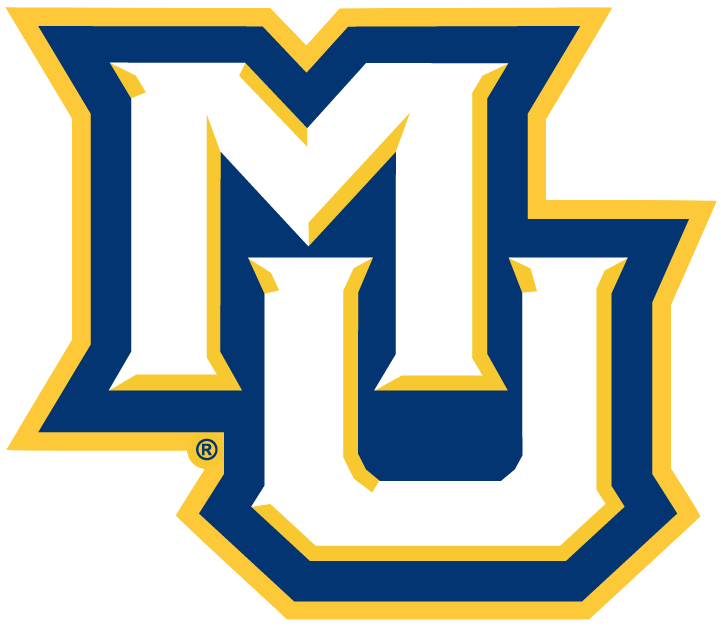

Big East regular season co-champions

NCAA Women's Tournament, second round
- Conference: Big East
- Record: 24–10 (15–3 Big East)
- Head coach: Carolyn Kieger (4th season)
- Assistant coaches: Ginny Boggess; Scott Merritt; Vernette Skeete
- Home arena: Al McGuire Center

2017–18 Big East Conference women's basketball standings
	Conf.				Overall
Team	W		L	PCT	W		L	PCT
DePaul †	15	–	3	.833	27	–	8	.771
Marquette	15	–	3	.833	24	–	10	.706
Villanova	12	–	6	.667	23	–	9	.719
Creighton	11	–	7	.611	19	–	13	.594
St. John's	9	–	9	.500	19	–	15	.559
Georgetown	9	–	9	.500	16	–	16	.500
Seton Hall	7	–	11	.389	16	–	16	.500
Butler	6	–	12	.333	15	–	17	.469
Xavier	3	–	15	.167	10	–	20	.333
Providence	3	–	15	.167	10	–	21	.323
† 2018 Big East tournament winner As of 25 March 2018; Rankings from AP poll

The 2017–18 Marquette Golden Eagles women's basketball team represented Marquette University in the 2017–18 NCAA Division I women's basketball season. The Golden Eagles, led by fourth year head coach Carolyn Kieger, play their home games at the Al McGuire Center and were members of the Big East Conference. They finished the season 24–10, 16–2 in Big East in Big East play to share the Big East regular season title with DePaul. They advanced to the championship game of the Big East women's tournament where they lost to DePaul. They received an at-large bid to the NCAA women's tournament where they defeated Dayton in the first round before losing to Louisville in the second round.

== Previous season ==
They finished the season 25–8, 13–5 in Big East play to finish in third place. They won the Big East tournament title for the first time in school history and earn an automatic trip to the NCAA women's tournament where they got upset by Quinnipiac in the first round.

== Roster ==
2017–18 Marquette Golden Eagles women's basketball team
Players
Coaches

Pos.	#	Name	Height	Year	Previous school	Hometown
F	0	Tori McCoy (redshirt)	6 ft 4 in (1.93 m)	So	St. Thomas More; Ohio State	Champaign, IL
G	1	Danielle King	5 ft 5 in (1.65 m)	Jr	Bloom Township	Chicago, IL
G	5	Natisha Hiedeman	5 ft 8 in (1.73 m)	Jr	Green Bay Southwest	Green Bay, WI
F	10	Sandra Dahling	5 ft 9 in (1.75 m)	Jr	Soina Gymnasium	Stockholm, Sweden
G	11	Allazia Blockton	6 ft 0 in (1.83 m)	Jr	Dominican	Milwaukee, WI
F	12	Erika Davenport	5 ft 11 in (1.8 m)	Jr	Clarkston	Clarkston, MI
G	13	Olivia Moskari	5 ft 9 in (1.75 m)	Jr	Makelanrinteen Lukio	Helsinki, Finland
G	15	Amani Wilborn	5 ft 9 in (1.75 m)	Jr	Riverside University	Milwaukee, WI
F	20	Altia Anderson	6 ft 2 in (1.88 m)	So	Woodbridge	Bridgeville, DE
G	24	Selena Lott	5 ft 11 in (1.8 m)	Fr	Columbia	East Greenbush, NY
G	30	Isabelle Spingola	6 ft 0 in (1.83 m)	So	Whitney Young	Chicago, IL
C	31	Shantelle Valentine	6 ft 3 in (1.91 m)	Sr	St. Roch	Toronto, ON
F	35	Myriama Smith Traore	6 ft 2 in (1.88 m)	Fr	Whitewater	Whitewater, WI
G	42	Lauren Van Kleunen	6 ft 2 in (1.88 m)	RS Fr	Mason	Mason, OH

Head coach

- Carolyn Kieger (Marquette)

Assistant coach(es)

- Ginny Boggess (Wingate)
- Scott Merritt (Marquette)
- Vernette Skeete (Alcorn State)

Legend

- (C) Team captain
- (S) Suspended
- (I) Ineligible
- (W) Walk-on
- Injured
- Current redshirt

Roster
Last update: February 21, 2018

== Schedule ==
Date time, TV	Rank^{#}	Opponent^{#}	Result	Record	Site (attendance) city, state
Exhibition
11/06/2017*; 1:00 pm	No. 17	Minnesota State	W 78–75		Al McGuire Center; Milwaukee, WI
Non-conference regular season
11/13/2017*; 8:00 pm	No. 16	at New Mexico	L 87–88	0–1	Dreamstyle Arena (4,169); Albuquerque, NM
11/19/2017*; 3:00 pm	No. 16	Loyola (MD)	W 83–63	1–1	Al McGuire Center (806); Milwaukee, WI
11/23/2017*; 5:30 pm	No. 20	vs. No. 12 Tennessee; Cancún Challenge Riviera Division	L 99–101 ^{OT}	1–2	Hard Rock Hotel Riviera Maya (982); Cancún, Mexico
11/24/2017*; 8:00 pm	No. 20	vs. Montana; Cancún Challenge Riviera Division	W 87–68	2–2	Hard Rock Hotel Riviera Maya (982); Cancún, Mexico
11/28/2017*; 11:30 am	No. 23	Loyola–Chicago	W 92–30	3–2	Al McGuire Center (3,700); Milwaukee, WI
12/04/2017*; 1:00 pm, ESPN3	No. 23	at Green Bay	L 55–63	3–3	Kress Events Center (2,865); Green Bay, WI
12/04/2017*; 7:00 pm		Wisconsin	W 88–65	4–3	Al McGuire Center (2,865); Milwaukee, WI
12/07/2017*; 6:00 pm		at No. 24 Michigan	L 76–82	4–4	Crisler Center (1,962); Ann Arbor, MI
12/10/2017*; 3:00 pm		Army	W 83–53	5–4	Al McGuire Center (1,219); Milwaukee, WI
12/17/2017*; 4:00 pm, FSWI		at Milwaukee	W 83–68	6–4	Klotsche Center (874); Milwaukee, WI
12/20/2017*; 2:00 pm, ACCN		at No. 2 Notre Dame	L 85–91 ^{OT}	6–5	Edmund P. Joyce Center (7,456); South Bend, IN
Big East regular season
12/28/2017; 7:30 pm, FS2		St. John's	W 74–72 ^{OT}	7–5 (1–0)	Al McGuire Center (1,479); Milwaukee, WI
12/30/2017; 7:30 pm, BEDN		Seton Hall	W 74–72	8–5 (2–0)	Al McGuire Center (1,392); Milwaukee, WI
01/04/2018; 7:00 pm, BEDN/FSWI		DePaul	W 93–81	9–5 (3–0)	Al McGuire Center (1,626); Milwaukee, WI
01/07/2018; 1:00 pm, FS2		at Creighton	W 92–77	10–5 (4–0)	D. J. Sokol Arena (1,109); Omaha, NE
01/10/2018; 6:00 pm, BEDN		at Providence	W 77–60	11–5 (5–0)	Alumni Hall (257); Providence, RI
01/12/2018; 7:00 pm, BEDN		Butler	W 69–67	12–5 (6–0)	Al McGuire Center (1,707); Milwaukee, WI
01/14/2018; 2:00 pm, BEDN		Xavier	W 88–67	13–5 (7–0)	Al McGuire Center (2,003); Milwaukee, WI
01/19/2018; 6:00 pm, BEDN		at Georgetown	L 58–85	13–6 (7–1)	McDonough Gymnasium (877); Washington, D.C.
01/21/2018; 11:00 am, FS1		at Villanova	W 67–57	14–6 (8–1)	Jake Nevin Field House (701); Villanova, PA
01/29/2018; 8:00 pm, FS1		at DePaul	L 83–95	14–7 (8–2)	McGrath-Phillips Arena (2,381); Chicago, IL
02/02/2018; 7:00 pm, BEDN		Providence	W 94–63	15–7 (9–2)	Al McGuire Center (2,019); Milwaukee, WI
02/04/2018; 1:00 pm, BEDN/FSWI		Creighton	L 73–74	15–8 (9–3)	Al McGuire Center (1,612); Milwaukee, WI
02/09/2018; 7:00 pm, FS2		at Xavier	W 80–63	16–8 (10–3)	Cintas Center (1,483); Cincinnati, OH
02/11/2018; 12:00 pm, BEDN		at Butler	W 78–59	17–8 (11–3)	Hinkle Fieldhouse (1,317); Indianapolis, IN
02/16/2018; 11:30 am, BEDN		Villanova	W 90–69	18–8 (12–3)	Al McGuire Center (2,438); Milwaukee, WI
02/18/2018; 2:00 pm, BEDN/FSWI		Georgetown	W 71–68	19–8 (13–3)	Al McGuire Center (2,245); Milwaukee, WI
02/23/2018; 6:00 pm, BEDN		at Seton Hall	W 81–54	20–8 (14–3)	Walsh Gymnasium (1,074); South Orange, NJ
02/25/2018; 1:00 pm, BEDN		at St. John's	W 76–57	21–8 (15–3)	Carnesecca Arena (1,069); Queens, NY
Big East Women's Tournament
03/04/2018; 12:00 pm, FS2	(1)	vs. (8) Butler; Quarterfinals	W 73–61	22–8	Wintrust Arena; Chicago, IL
03/04/2018; 3:00 pm, FS1	(1)	vs. (4) Creighton; Semifinals	W 76–70	23–8	Wintrust Arena; Chicago, IL
03/06/2018; 6:00 pm, FS1	(1)	vs. (2) DePaul; Championship Game	L 63–98	23–9	Wintrust Arena (2,264); Chicago, IL
NCAA Women's Tournament
03/16/2018*; 1:30 pm, ESPN2	(8 L)	vs. (9 L) Dayton; First Round	W 84–65	24–9	KFC Yum! Center (7,229); Louisville, KY
03/18/2018*; 11:00 am, ESPN2	(8 L)	at (1 L) No. 3 Louisville; Second Round	L 72–90	24–10	KFC Yum! Center (8,017); Louisville, KY
*Non-conference game. ^{#}Rankings from AP Poll. (#) Tournament seedings in parentheses. L=Lexington Region. All times are in Central.

== Rankings ==
2017–18 NCAA Division I women's basketball rankings

Regular season polls
Poll	Pre- season	Week 2	Week 3	Week 4	Week 5	Week 6	Week 7	Week 8	Week 9	Week 10	Week 11	Week 12	Week 13	Week 14	Week 15	Week 16	Week 17	Week 18	Week 19	Final
AP	17	16	20	23	RV	RV	RV	RV	NR	RV	RV	RV	RV	NR	NR	NR	NR	NR	NR	N/A
Coaches	19	N/A	20	23	RV	NR	NR	RV	RV	RV	RV	RV	RV	RV	RV	RV	RV	RV	RV	RV

Legend
	Increase in ranking
	Decrease in ranking
	No change
(RV)	Received votes
(NR)	Not ranked

== See also ==
2017–18 Marquette Golden Eagles men's basketball team
