= Jasmine Lister =

American basketball player (born 1992)

Personal information
- Born: September 12, 1992 (age 34) Los Angeles, California, U.S.
- Listed height: 5 ft 4 in (1.63 m)
- Listed weight: 135 lb (61 kg)

Career information
- High school: Santiago (Corona, California)
- College: Vanderbilt (2010–2014)
- WNBA draft: 2014: undrafted
- Playing career: 2014–2015
- Position: Guard
- Number: 12
- Coaching career: 2014–2020

Career history

Playing
- 2015: Los Angeles Sparks

Coaching
- 2014–2016: UConn (graduate assistant)
- 2016–2017: Washington (assistant)
- 2017–2018: DePaul (assistant)
- 2018–2020: UConn (assistant)

Career highlights
- SEC All-Freshman team (2011); 3× Second-team All-SEC (2012–2014)
- Stats at WNBA.com
- Stats at Basketball Reference

Jasmine Lister (born September 12, 1992) is an American former basketball coach and professional basketball player. She played guard for the Los Angeles Sparks of the Women's National Basketball Association (WNBA). Lister played college basketball for the Vanderbilt Commodores and was an assistant coach for the UConn Huskies, DePaul Blue Demons, and Washington Huskies.

== Early life ==
Lister was a four-year starter and three-time team most valuable player on the basketball team at Santiago High School in Corona, California. She set several school records, including most points in a game (38), most points in a season (656), and most career points (2,265). Lister averaged 20 points, five assists, and four steals per game in her senior season. She was a three-time first-team All-State selection and was her class salutatorian.

== College career ==
As a freshman at Vanderbilt, Lister was one of only two players on the team to start in every game, leading the team in minutes played and points per game (11.8). She was named to the SEC All-Freshman team for her efforts.

Lister led the SEC in assists per game (5.3) and free throw percentage (83.7%) in her sophomore year. She recorded her first career double-double in a win against the nation's 11th-ranked team, Tennessee, with 19 points and 13 assists. Lister recorded 19 points, five assists, and five rebounds in a win against Middle Tennessee in the first round of the 2012 NCAA Division I women's basketball tournament, and added 16 points and seven assists against #6 Duke in the following round. She was named second-team All-SEC in her sophomore season.

In her junior season, Lister was first in the SEC in minutes played per game (36.5). She achieved three more double-doubles and recorded 14 points and five rebounds in a victory over Saint Joseph's in the first round of the 2013 NCAA Division I women's basketball tournament. Lister was named second-team All-SEC for a second time after her junior season.

Lister again earned all-conference honors in her senior season. She recorded another double-double (23 points and 10 assists) in a win against Auburn. In the final game of her college career, she recorded nine points and four assists in a losing effort against Arizona State in the first round of the 2014 NCAA Division I women's basketball tournament.

Lister earned a reputation of physical durability at Vanderbilt, starting in all 129 games of her career and setting a school record for career minutes played (4,626). She majored in women and gender studies at Vanderbilt.

== Professional and coaching career ==
During the 2014 WNBA preseason, Lister participated in training camp with the Seattle Storm, but was not selected for the team's final roster. UConn head coach Geno Auriemma hired Lister as a graduate assistant for the 2014–15 and 2015–16 seasons, where she earned a master's degree in sport management; UConn won national championships in both seasons. Additionally, she played for the WNBA's Los Angeles Sparks in 2015, appearing in seven games. After two years at UConn, Lister joined Mike Neighbors's staff at Washington as an assistant coach for the 2016–17 season. She spent the 2017–2018 season as an assistant coach at DePaul, a season in which the Blue Demons won the Big East regular season and conference tournament championships. She returned to Auriemma's staff at UConn in 2018 as an assistant coach. In January 2020, UConn announced that Lister was taking a leave of absence for personal reasons after missing eight games and not "feeling well". That May, the school announced her resignation; Auriemma noted that Lister was "doing well" but would be pursuing other opportunities. Lister expressed gratitude to UConn and Auriemma in a statement confirming her resignation.

== Career statistics ==
Legend
GP	Games played	GS	Games started	MPG	Minutes per game	RPG	Rebounds per game
APG	Assists per game	SPG	Steals per game	BPG	Blocks per game	PPG	Points per game
TO	Turnovers per game	FG%	Field-goal percentage	3P%	3-point field-goal percentage	FT%	Free-throw percentage
**Bold**	Career best	°	League leader

=== WNBA ===
WNBA regular season statistics
Year	Team	GP	GS	MPG	FG%	3P%	FT%	RPG	APG	SPG	BPG	TO	PPG
2015	Los Angeles	7	0	9.3	.533	.800	—	1.3	0.6	0.3	0.0	1.0	2.9
**Career**	1 year, 1 team	7	0	9.3	.533	.800	—	1.3	0.6	0.3	0.0	1.0	2.9

=== College ===
NCAA statistics
Year	Team	GP	GS	MPG	FG%	3P%	FT%	RPG	APG	SPG	BPG	TO	PPG
2010–11	Vanderbilt	32	32	33.9	.391	.367	.714	2.6	3.2	0.6	0.0	**2.7**	11.8
2011–12	Vanderbilt	**33**	**33**	**36.8**	.427	.348	.837	2.8	**5.3**	**1.0**	0.0	3.5	12.5
2011–12	Vanderbilt	**33**	**33**	36.5	.387	.368	**.865**	3.0	5.1	0.8	0.0	3.4	12.2
2013–14	Vanderbilt	30	30	36.3	**.450**	**.446**	.859	**3.6**	4.7	0.9	0.0	**2.7**	**13.9**
**Career**		128	128	35.9	.413	.379	.823	3.0	4.6	0.9	0.0	3.1	12.6

== Personal life ==
Her twin sister, Cinnamon Lister, played college basketball at Boise State and Cal State Northridge. She was also an assistant coach at Princeton and UC Irvine, as well as the WNBA's Phoenix Mercury.

After her basketball coaching career, Lister opened a therapy practice in San Diego, California.
