= 2017–18 NCAA Division I women's basketball rankings =

- Season: 2017–18
- NCAA Tournament: 2018
- Preseason No. 1: Connecticut
- NCAA Tournament Champions: Notre Dame
NCAA Division I women's basketball rankings


Two human polls make up the 2017–18 NCAA Division I women's basketball rankings, the AP Poll and the Coaches Poll, in addition to various publications' preseason polls.

== Notable events ==
Stanford failed to be in the top 25 in the AP Poll released December 25, 2017. They had been in the top 25 for the prior 312 consecutive weeks, tied with Duke for the third-longest streak in the top 25. The longest streak (not currently active) is 565 weeks (32 seasons) held by Tennessee between February 17, 1985, and February 15, 2016. The second-longest streak, and longest active streak, is held by Connecticut, and currently active as of December 25, 2017, at 458 weeks, starting with the preseason 1993–94 poll.

== Legend ==
	Increase in ranking
	Decrease in ranking
	Not ranked previous week
Italics	Number of first-place votes
(#–#)	Win–loss record
т	Tied with team above or below also with this symbol

== AP Poll ==
	Preseason Nov. 2	Week 2 Nov. 13	Week 3 Nov. 20	Week 4 Nov. 27	Week 5 Dec. 4	Week 6 Dec. 11	Week 7 Dec. 18	Week 8 Dec. 25	Week 9 Jan. 1	Week 10 Jan. 8	Week 11 Jan. 15	Week 12 Jan. 22	Week 13 Jan. 29	Week 14 Feb. 5	Week 15 Feb. 12	Week 16 Feb. 19	Week 17 Feb. 26	Week 18 Mar. 5	Week 19 Mar. 12	
1.	Connecticut (32)	Connecticut (1–0) (32)	Connecticut (3–0) (32)	Connecticut (5–0) (31)	Connecticut (7–0) (32)	Connecticut (8–0) (32)	Connecticut (8–0) (32)	Connecticut (10–0) (32)	Connecticut (11–0) (32)	Connecticut (13–0) (32)	Connecticut (15–0) (32)	Connecticut (18–0) (32)	Connecticut (20–0) (32)	Connecticut (22–0) (32)	Connecticut (24–0) (32)	Connecticut (26–0) (32)	Connecticut (28–0) (32)	Connecticut (30–0) (32)	Connecticut (32–0) (32)	1.
2.	Texas	Texas (1–0)	Texas (3–0)	Texas (5–0)	Texas (7–0)	Notre Dame (9–1)	Notre Dame (10–1)	Notre Dame (11–1)	Notre Dame (13–1)	Notre Dame (15–1)	Louisville (19–0)	Mississippi State (20–0)	Mississippi State (22–0)	Mississippi State (23–0)	Mississippi State (26–0)	Mississippi State (28–0)	Mississippi State (30–0)	Baylor (30–1)	Baylor (31–1)	2.
3.	Baylor	Baylor (2–0)	South Carolina (4–0)	Notre Dame (6–0)	Notre Dame (7–1)	Louisville (11–0)	Louisville (13–0)	Louisville (14–0)	Louisville (16–0)	Louisville (18–0)	Mississippi State (19–0)	Baylor (17–1)	Baylor (19–1)	Baylor (21–1)	Baylor (23–1)	Baylor (25–1)	Baylor (27–1)	Louisville (32–2)	Louisville (32–2)	3.
4.	South Carolina	South Carolina (1–0)	Louisville (5–0)	Louisville (6–0)	Louisville (8–0)	South Carolina (9–1)	South Carolina (10–1)	South Carolina (11–1)	South Carolina (12–1)	Mississippi State (17–0)	Baylor (15–1)	Louisville (20–1)	Louisville (22–1)	Louisville (24–1)	Louisville (25–1)	Louisville (27–2)	Louisville (29–2)	Mississippi State (32–1)	Mississippi State (32–1)	4.
5.	Ohio State	Louisville (2–0)	UCLA (3–0)	South Carolina (6–1)	South Carolina (8–1)	Mississippi State (9–0)	Mississippi State (11–0)	Mississippi State (13–0)	Mississippi State (15–0)	Baylor (14–1)	Notre Dame (16–2)	Notre Dame (18–2)	Notre Dame (20–2)	Notre Dame (22–2)	Notre Dame (23–2)	Notre Dame (25–2)	Notre Dame (27–2)	Notre Dame (29–3)	Notre Dame (29–3)	5.
6.	Notre Dame	Notre Dame (1–0)	Notre Dame (3–0)	Mississippi State (6–0)	Mississippi State (8–0)	Baylor (8–1)	Baylor (9–1)	Baylor (10–1)	Baylor (12–1)	Tennessee (15–0)	Tennessee (16–1)	Texas (15–3)	Oregon (20–3)	Texas (18–4)	Texas (20–4)	Texas (22–4)	Oregon (27–4)	Oregon (30–4)	Oregon (30–4)	6.
7.	Mississippi State	Mississippi State (1–0)	Mississippi State (3–0)	UCLA (5–1)	UCLA (7–1)	Tennessee (10–0)	Tennessee (11–0)	Tennessee (12–0)	Tennessee (13–0)	Texas (13–1)	Oregon (17–2)	Oregon (18–3)	South Carolina (18–3)	South Carolina (18–4)	UCLA (21–4)	South Carolina (22–5)	Texas (23–5)	South Carolina (26–6)	South Carolina (26–6)	7.
8.	UCLA	UCLA (2–0)	Baylor (3–1)	Ohio State (7–1)	Baylor (7–1)	Texas (7–1)	Texas (9–1)	Texas (9–1)	Texas (11–1)	Oregon (15–2)	Ohio State (16–2)	Florida State (18–2)	Texas (16–4)	UCLA (18–4)	South Carolina (20–5)	Oregon (24–4)	South Carolina (23–6)	Texas (26–5)	Texas (26–6)	8.
9.	Louisville	Ohio State (1–1)	Ohio State (4–1)	Baylor (5–1)	Oregon (7–1)	Oregon (8–1)	West Virginia (10–0)	West Virginia (12–0)	Oregon (13–2)	South Carolina (13–2)	Texas (14–2)	South Carolina (16–3)	UCLA (17–4)	Oregon (21–4)	Oregon (23–4)	Florida State (22–4)	UCLA (23–6)	UCLA (24–7)	UCLA (24–7)	9.
10.	Stanford	Oregon (2–0)	Oregon (3–1)	Oregon (5–1)	West Virginia (7–0)	West Virginia (9–0)	Oregon (9–2)	Oregon (11–2)	Ohio State (13–2)	Ohio State (15–2)	South Carolina (14–3)	Tennessee (16–3)	Florida State (18–3)	Maryland (20–3)	Maryland (22–3)	UCLA (21–5)	Oregon State (23–6)	Ohio State (27–6)	Ohio State (27–6)	10.
11.	Oregon	Duke (1–0)	West Virginia (3–0)	West Virginia (6–0)	Tennessee (8–0)	UCLA (7–2)	UCLA (8–2)	UCLA (9–2)	Florida State (13–1)	Maryland (15–2)	Missouri (15–2)	Missouri (17–2)	Maryland (18–3)	Tennessee (19–4)	Tennessee (21–4)	Missouri (22–5)	Florida State (24–5)	Florida State (25–6)	Florida State (25–6)	11.
12.	Duke	West Virginia (1–0)	Tennessee (2–0)	Tennessee (6–0)	Ohio State (8–2)	Florida State (10–0)	Ohio State (11–2)	Ohio State (11–2)	West Virginia (13–1)	Missouri (14–2)	Florida State (16–2)	Ohio State (16–3)	Tennessee (17–4)	Florida State (19–4)	Florida State (21–4)	Oregon State (21–6)	Tennessee (23–6)	Tennessee (24–7)	Tennessee (24–7)	12.
13.	West Virginia	Tennessee (1–0)	Florida State (4–0)	Florida State (6–0)	Florida State (8–0)	Ohio State (9–2)	Florida State (10–1)	Florida State (11–1)	Maryland (13–2)	Florida State (14–2)	UCLA (13–4)	UCLA (15–4)	Michigan (19–4)	Ohio State (19–5)	Missouri (19–5)	Maryland (22–5)	Ohio State (24–6)	Oregon State (23–7)	Oregon State (23–7)	13.
14.	Tennessee	Stanford (0–2)	Stanford (2–2)	Duke (5–1)	Duke (6–2)	Duke (8–2)	Duke (8–2)	Duke (10–2)	UCLA (10–3)	UCLA (11–4)	Maryland (15–3)	Maryland (16–3)	Texas A&M (17–5)	Texas A&M (18–6)	Stanford (18–8)	Ohio State (22–6)	Missouri (23–6)	Texas A&M (24–9)	Texas A&M (24–9)	14.
15.	Maryland	Maryland (1–0)	Maryland (2–2)	Maryland (5–2)	Maryland (7–2)	Maryland (9–2)	Maryland (10–2)	Maryland (11–2)	Missouri (13–1)	West Virginia (14–2)	Duke (14–4)	Texas A&M (15–5)	Missouri (17–4)	Missouri (17–5)	Oregon State (19–6)	Tennessee (21–6)	Texas A&M (22–8)	Stanford (22–10)	Stanford (22–10)	15.
16.	Missouri	Marquette (0–0)	Duke (2–1)	Stanford (4–3)	South Florida (7–1)	Missouri (9–1)	Missouri (10–1)	Missouri (12–1)	Oregon State (11–2)	Duke (12–4)	Texas A&M (14–5)	Michigan (17–4)	Oregon State (16–5)	Oregon State (17–6)	Ohio State (20–6)	Stanford (19–9)	Stanford (20–9)	Missouri (24–7)	Maryland (25–7)	16.
17.	Marquette	Florida State (2–0)	South Florida (3–0)	South Florida (6–1)	Missouri (7–1)	Oregon State (6–2)	Oregon State (8–2)	Oregon State (9–2)	Duke (11–3)	Texas A&M (13–4)	West Virginia (15–3)	Oregon State (14–5)	Georgia (19–2)	Stanford (16–8)	Duke (20–6)	Texas A&M (20–8)	Maryland (23–6)	Maryland (25–7)	Missouri (24–7)	17.
18.	Florida State	Oregon State (1–0)	Oregon State (2–1)	Texas A&M (4–1)	Stanford (5–4)	Stanford (5–4)	Stanford (6–4)	Villanova (10–0)	Iowa (14–1)	Arizona State (13–3) T	Oregon State (13–4)	Duke (15–5)	Ohio State (17–5)	Georgia (20–3)	Texas A&M (19–7)	South Florida (22–5)	Duke (22–7)	Georgia (25–6)	Georgia (25–6)	18.
19.	Oregon State	Texas A&M (2–0)	Texas A&M (2–1)	Missouri (5–1)	Oregon State (5–2)	Texas A&M (8–2)	Texas A&M (9–2)	Green Bay (10–1)	Texas A&M (11–4)	Iowa (15–2) T	Michigan (15–4)	Oklahoma State (14–4)	Duke (17–5)	Duke (18–6)	Green Bay (22–2)	Georgia (21–5)	Georgia (24–5)	South Florida (25–6)	South Florida (26–7)	19.
20.	California T	California (1–0)	Marquette (1–1)	Kentucky (6–0)	Kentucky (7–1)	Villanova (9–0)	Villanova (9–0)	California (9–2)	Oklahoma State (11–2)	Oklahoma State (12–3)	Iowa (15–3)	West Virginia (16–4)	Green Bay (19–2)	Green Bay (21–2)	Georgia (21–4)	Duke (20–7)	South Florida (24–5)	Duke (22–8)	Duke (22–8)	20.
21.	Texas A&M T	Oklahoma (1–0)	California (2–1)	Oregon State (3–2)	Texas A&M (6–2)	Green Bay (8–1)	Green Bay (9–1)	Michigan (11–2)	Villanova (11–1)	Rutgers (16–2)	California (13–4)	Georgia (17–2)	West Virginia (17–5)	Michigan (19–6)	Oklahoma State (18–6)	NC State (21–6)	Green Bay (26–3)	NC State (24–8)	NC State (24–8)	21.
22.	Oklahoma	South Florida (2–0)	Kentucky (4–0)	Michigan (4–1)	Villanova (7–0)	South Florida (7–2)	South Florida (9–2)	Texas A&M (10–3)	Michigan (12–3)	Oregon State (11–4)	Arizona State (13–5)	Green Bay (17–2)	TCU (15–5)	Oklahoma State (16–6)	South Florida (20–5)	Green Bay (23–3)	Belmont (28–3)	Green Bay (27–3)	Green Bay (29–3)	22.
23.	South Florida	Missouri (1–1)	Missouri (3–1)	Marquette (2–2)	Green Bay (6–1)	Michigan (8–2)	Michigan (10–2)	Iowa (12–1)	California (10–3)	Michigan (13–4)	Green Bay (14–2)	California (14–5)	Oklahoma State (15–5)	NC State (19–5)	Michigan (20–7)	Belmont (26–3)	NC State (22–7)	Belmont (31–3)	Belmont (31–3)	23.
24.	Michigan	Michigan (2–0)	Arizona State (4–0)	California (3–2)	Michigan (5–2)	California (7–2)	California (8–2)	Oklahoma State (9–2)	Stanford (8–6)	California (11–4)	Oklahoma State (12–4)	TCU (13–5)	Stanford (14–8)	TCU (16–6)	Belmont (24–3)	LSU (18–7)	LSU (19-8)	LSU (19–9)	LSU (19–9)	24.
25.	DePaul	Kentucky (2–0)	Michigan (2–1)	Villanova (5–0)	California (5–2)	Iowa (10–1)	Iowa (11–1)	South Florida (10–3)	Arizona State (11–3)	Green Bay (12–2)	Rutgers (17–3)	Arizona State (14–6)	California (15–6)	Arizona State (17–7)	NC State (20–6)	Oklahoma State (18–8)	Mercer (27–2)	Mercer (30–2)	Mercer (30–2)	25.
	Preseason Nov. 2	Week 2 Nov. 13	Week 3 Nov. 20	Week 4 Nov. 27	Week 5 Dec. 4	Week 6 Dec. 11	Week 7 Dec. 18	Week 8 Dec. 25	Week 9 Jan. 1	Week 10 Jan. 8	Week 11 Jan. 15	Week 12 Jan. 22	Week 13 Jan. 29	Week 14 Feb. 5	Week 15 Feb. 12	Week 16 Feb. 19	Week 17 Feb. 26	Week 18 Mar. 5	Week 19 Mar. 12	
		Dropped: DePaul (1–1)	Dropped: Oklahoma (2–1)	Dropped: Arizona State (5–2)	Dropped: Marquette (3–3)	Dropped: Kentucky (8-3)	None	Dropped: Stanford (6–6)	Dropped: Green Bay (11-2); South Florida (11-3)	Dropped: Villanova (12-2); Stanford (9-7)	None	Dropped: Iowa (15-5); Rutgers (17-5)	Dropped: Arizona State (15-7)	Dropped: West Virginia (17-6); California (15-8)	Dropped: Arizona State (17-9); TCU (16-8)	Dropped: Michigan (20-8)	Dropped: Oklahoma State (19-9)	None	None	

== USA Today Coaches Poll ==
The Coaches Poll is the second-oldest poll still in use after the AP Poll. It is compiled by a rotating group of 31 college Division I head coaches. The poll operates by Borda count. Each voting member ranks teams from 1 to 25. Each team then receives points for their ranking in reverse order: Number 1 earns 25 points, number 2 earns 24 points, and so forth. The points are then combined and the team with the most points is then ranked No. 1; second most is ranked No. 2 and so forth. Only the top 25 teams with points are ranked, with teams receiving first-place votes noted the quantity next to their name. The maximum points a single team can earn is 775.

	Preseason Oct. 26	Week 2 Nov. 21	Week 3 Nov. 28	Week 4 Dec. 5	Week 5 Dec. 12	Week 6 Dec. 19	Week 7 Dec. 26	Week 8 Jan. 2	Week 9 Jan. 9	Week 10 Jan. 16	Week 11 Jan. 22	Week 12 Jan. 29	Week 13 Feb 6.	Week 14 Feb. 13	Week 15 Feb. 19	Week 16 Feb. 26	Week 17 Mar. 5	Week 18 Mar. 12	Week 19 Final	
1.	Connecticut	Connecticut (3–0)	Connecticut (5–0)	Connecticut (7–0)	Connecticut (8–0)	Connecticut (8–0)	Connecticut (10–0)	Connecticut (11–0)	Connecticut (13–0)	Connecticut (16–0)	Connecticut (18–0)	Connecticut (20–0) (32)	Connecticut (22–0) (32)	Connecticut (25–0) (32)	Connecticut (26–0) (32)	Connecticut (29–0) (32)	Connecticut (31–0) (32)	Connecticut (32–0) (32)	Notre Dame (35–3) (32)	1.
2.	South Carolina	South Carolina (4–0)	Notre Dame (6–0)	Notre Dame (7–1)	Notre Dame (9–1)	Notre Dame (10–1)	Notre Dame (11–1)	Notre Dame (13–1)	Notre Dame (15–1)	Louisville (19–0)	Mississippi State (20–0)	Mississippi State (22–0)	Mississippi State (24–0)	Mississippi State (26–0)	Mississippi State (28–0)	Mississippi State (30–0)	Baylor (31–1)	Baylor (31–1)	Mississippi State (37–2)	2.
3.	Baylor	Mississippi State (3–0)	Mississippi State (6–0)	Mississippi State (8–0)	Mississippi State (9–0)	Mississippi State (11–0)	Mississippi State (13–0)	Mississippi State (15–0)	Mississippi State (17–0)	Mississippi State (19–0)	Baylor (17–1)	Baylor (19–1)	Baylor (22–1)	Baylor (23–1)	Baylor (26–1)	Baylor (28–1)	Louisville (32–2)	Louisville (32–2)	Connecticut (36–1)	3.
4.	Mississippi State	UCLA (3–0) T	Texas (5–0)	Texas (7–0)	Louisville (11–0)	Louisville (13–0)	Louisville (14–0)	Louisville (16–0)	Louisville (18–0)	Baylor (15–1)	Louisville (20–1)	Louisville (22–1)	Louisville (24–1)	Notre Dame (23–2)	Notre Dame (25–2)	Notre Dame (27–2)	Mississippi State (32–1)	Mississippi State (32–1)	Louisville (36–3)	4.
5.	Notre Dame	Texas (3–0) T	Louisville (6–0)	Louisville (8–0)	South Carolina (9–1)	South Carolina (10–1)	South Carolina (11–1)	South Carolina (12–1)	Baylor (14–1)	Notre Dame (16–2)	Notre Dame (18–2)	Notre Dame (20–2)	Notre Dame (22–2)	Louisville (25–2)	Louisville (27–2)	Louisville (29–2)	Oregon (30–4)	Oregon (30–4)	Oregon (33–5)	5.
6.	Texas	Notre Dame (3–0)	South Carolina (6–1)	South Carolina (8–1)	Baylor (8–1)	Baylor (10–1)	Baylor (10–1)	Baylor (12–1)	Tennessee (15–0)	Oregon (16–2)	Texas (15–3)	South Carolina (18–3)	Texas (19–4)	Texas (20–4)	South Carolina (22–5)	Oregon (27–4)	Notre Dame (29–3)	Notre Dame (29–3)	South Carolina (29–7)	6.
7.	UCLA	Louisville (5–0)	UCLA (5–1)	UCLA (7–1)	Tennessee (10–0)	Tennessee (11–0)	Tennessee (12–0)	Tennessee (13–0)	Texas (13–1)	Tennessee (16–1)	South Carolina (16–3)	Oregon (20–3)	UCLA (19–4)	UCLA (21–4)	Oregon (25–4)	Texas (23–5)	South Carolina (26–6)	South Carolina (26–6)	UCLA (27–8)	7.
8.	Ohio State	Ohio State (4–1)	Ohio State (7–1)	Baylor (7–1)	Texas (7–1)	Texas (9–1)	Texas (9–1)	Texas (11–1)	South Carolina (13–2)	Ohio State (16–2)	Florida State (18–2)	Texas (16–4)	South Carolina (18–5)	South Carolina (20–5)	Texas (22–5)	South Carolina (23–6)	Texas (26–6)	Texas (26–6)	Oregon State (26–8)	8.
9.	Stanford	Baylor (3–1)	Baylor (5–1)	Oregon (7–1)	Oregon (8–1)	West Virginia (10–0)	West Virginia (12–0)	Oregon (13–2)	Oregon (15–2)	Texas (14–3)	Oregon (18–3)	UCLA (17–4)	Maryland (20–3)	Maryland (22–3)	Missouri (22–5)	UCLA (23–6)	UCLA (24–7)	UCLA (24–7)	Baylor (33–2)	9.
10.	Louisville	Oregon (3–1)	Oregon (5–1)	Florida State (8–0)	Florida State (10–0)	Oregon (9–2)	Oregon (11–2)	Ohio State (13–2)	Ohio State (15–2)	South Carolina (14–3)	Tennessee (16–3)	Maryland (18–3)	Oregon (21–4)	Oregon (23–4)	UCLA (21–6)	Oregon State (23–6)	Ohio State (27–6)	Ohio State (27–6)	Texas (28–7)	10.
11.	Oregon	Florida State (3–0)	Florida State (6–0)	West Virginia (7–0)	West Virginia (9–0)	Ohio State (11–2)	Ohio State (11–2)	West Virginia (13–1)	Maryland (15–2)	Florida State (16–2)	Missouri (17–2)	Florida State (18–3)	Tennessee (19–4)	Tennessee (21–4)	Oregon State (21–6)	Florida State (24–5)	Florida State (25–6)	Florida State (25–6)	Texas A&M (26–10)	11.
12.	Duke	Stanford (2–2)	West Virginia (6–0)	Ohio State (8–2)	UCLA (7–2)	UCLA (8–2)	UCLA (9–2)	Florida State (13–1)	Florida State (14–2)	Missouri (15–2)	UCLA (15–4)	Texas A&M (17–5)	Florida State (19–4)	Florida State (21–4)	Florida State (22–5)	Tennessee (23–6)	Oregon State (23–7)	Oregon State (23–7)	Duke (24–9)	12.
13.	Maryland	West Virginia (3–0)	Tennessee (6–0)	Tennessee (8–0)	Ohio State (9–2)	Florida State (10–1)	Florida State (11–1)	Maryland (13–2)	Missouri (14–2)	UCLA (13–4)	Maryland (17–3)	Tennessee (17–4)	Ohio St. (19–5)	Missouri (20–5)	Maryland (22–5)	Missouri (23–6)	Tennessee (24–7)	Tennessee (24–7)	Stanford (24–11)	13.
14.	Florida State	Tennessee (3–0)	Stanford (4–3)	Duke (6–2) T	Duke (8–2)	Maryland (10–2)	Maryland (11–2)	UCLA (10–3)	UCLA (11–4)	Maryland (15–3)	Ohio State (16–4)	Michigan (19–4)	Texas A&M (18–6)	Oregon State (19–6)	Tennessee (21–6)	Ohio State (24–6)	Missouri (24–7)	Texas A&M (24–9)	Florida State (26–7)	14.
15.	West Virginia	Maryland (2–2)	Maryland (5–2)	Maryland (7–2) T	Maryland (10–2)	Duke (8–2)	Duke (10–2)	Missouri (13–1)	West Virginia (14–2)	Duke (14–4)	Texas A&M (16–5)	Missouri (17–4)	Missouri (18–5)	Green Bay (22–2)	Ohio State (22–6)	Duke (22–7)	Texas A&M (24–9)	Missouri (24–7)	Ohio State (28–7)	15.
16.	Missouri	South Florida (4–0)	Duke (5–1)	South Florida (7–1)	Missouri (9–1)	Missouri (11–1)	Missouri (12–1)	Oregon State (11–2)	Texas A&M (13–4)	West Virginia (15–3)	Michigan (17–4)	Oregon State (16–5)	Oregon St. (17–6)	Duke (20–6)	Duke (21–7)	Texas A&M (22–8)	Maryland (25–7)	Maryland (25–7)	NC State (26–9)	16.
17.	Oregon State	Duke (2–1)	South Florida (6–1)	Missouri (7–1)	Stanford (5–4)	Oregon State (8–2)	Oregon State (9–2)	Iowa (14–1)	Iowa (15–2)	Texas A&M (14–5)	Oregon State (14–5)	Ohio State (17–5)	Green Bay (21–2)	Ohio State (20–6)	South Florida (22–5)	Maryland (23–6)	Georgia (25–6)	Georgia (25–6)	Tennessee (25–8)	17.
18.	Tennessee	Oregon State (2–1)	Missouri (5–1)	Stanford (5–4)	Oregon State (6–2)	Villanova (9–0)	Villanova (10–0)	Duke (11–3)	Duke (12–4)	Michigan (15–4)	Duke (15–5)	Georgia (19–2)	Georgia (20–3)	Texas A&M (19–7)	Texas A&M (20–8)	Georgia (24–5)	Duke (22–8)	Duke (22–8)	Maryland (26–8)	18.
19.	Marquette	Missouri (3–1)	Oregon State (3–2)	Oregon State (5–2)	Villanova (9–0)	South Florida (9–2)	Michigan (11–2)	Texas A&M (11–4)	Rutgers (16–2)	Oregon State (13–4)	West Virginia (16–4)	Duke (17–5)	Duke (18–6)	Georgia (21–4)	Georgia (22–5)	South Florida (24–6)	South Florida (26–6)	Stanford (22–10)	Georgia (26–7)	19.
20.	DePaul	Marquette (1–1)	Michigan (4–1)	Villanova (7–0)	South Florida (7–2)	Texas A&M (9–2)	Green Bay (10–1)	Michigan (12–3)	Michigan (13–4)	Iowa (15–3)	Georgia (17–2)	Green Bay (19–2)	Michigan (19–6)	Stanford (18–8)	Stanford (19–9)	Stanford (20–9)	Stanford (22–10)	South Florida (26–7)	Central Michigan (30–5)	20.
21.	Oklahoma	DePaul (3–1)	Texas A&M (4–1)	Michigan (6–2)	Michigan (8–2)	Michigan (10–2)	Texas A&M (10–3)	Villanova (11–1)	Oregon State (11–4)	Rutgers (17–3)	Green Bay (17–2)	West Virginia (17–5)	Stanford (16–8)	South Florida (20–5)	Green Bay (24–3)	Green Bay (26–3)	Green Bay (28–3)	Green Bay (29–3)	Buffalo (29–6)	21.
22.	South Florida	Michigan (2–1)	Kentucky (6–0)	Texas A&M (6–2)	Texas A&M (8–2)	Syracuse (11–0)	Iowa (12–1)	South Florida (11–3)	Oklahoma State (12–3)	Green Bay (15–2)	Oklahoma State (14–4)	TCU (15–5)	South Florida (18–5)	Oklahoma State (18–6)	NC State (21–6)	NC State (22–7)	NC State (24–8)	NC State (24–8)	Missouri (24–8)	22.
23.	Michigan	NC State (5–0) T	Marquette (2–2)	Kentucky (7–1)	Syracuse (10–0)	Green Bay (9–1)	Syracuse (12–1)	Oklahoma State (11–2)	Arizona State (13–3)	South Florida (14–4)	South Florida (15–5)	South Florida (16–5)	NC State (19–5)	Michigan (20–7)	Oklahoma State (18–8)	Syracuse (22–7)	Mercer (30–2)	DePaul (26–7)	De Paul (27–8)	23.
24.	Miami (FL)	California (2–1) T	Villanova (5–0)	Syracuse (8–0)	Green Bay (8–1)	Stanford (6–5)	South Florida (10–3)	Green Bay (11–2)	Green Bay (12–2)	Georgia (16–2)	TCU (13–5)	Oklahoma State (15–5)	TCU (16–6)	DePaul (20–6)	Syracuse (20–7)	Michigan (21–8)	DePaul (25–7)	Mercer(30–2)	South Florida (26–8)	24.
25.	California T	Texas A&M (2–1)	Syracuse (6–0)	Green Bay (6–1)	Iowa (10–1)	Iowa (11–1)	California (9–2)	Rutgers (14–2)	South Florida (12–4)	Arizona State (13–5)	Iowa (15–5)	Florida Gulf Coast (20–3)	Oklahoma St. (16–6)	NC State (20–6)	Mercer (25–2)	Mercer (27–2)	Belmont (31–3)	Belmont (31–3)	Florida Gulf Coast (31–5)	25.
	Preseason Oct. 26	Week 2 Nov. 21	Week 3 Nov. 28	Week 4 Dec. 5	Week 5 Dec. 12	Week 6 Dec. 19	Week 7 Dec. 26	Week 8 Jan. 2	Week 9 Jan. 9	Week 10 Jan. 16	Week 11 Jan. 22	Week 12 Jan. 29	Week 13 Feb 6.	Week 14 Feb. 13	Week 15 Feb. 19	Week 16 Feb. 26	Week 17 Mar. 5	Week 18 Mar. 12	Week 19 Final	
		Dropped: Oklahoma; Miami (FL)	Dropped: DePaul (5–2); NC State (7–1); California (3–2)	Dropped: Marquette	Dropped: Kentucky	None	Dropped: Stanford (6–6)	Dropped: Syracuse; California	Dropped: Villanova	Dropped: Oklahoma State	Dropped: Rutgers; Arizona State	Dropped: Iowa	Dropped: Florida Gulf Coast; West Virginia	Dropped: TCU	Dropped: Michigan; DePaul	Dropped: Oklahoma State	Dropped: Michigan; Syracuse	None	Dropped: Green Bay; Mercer; Belmont	

== See also ==
- 2017–18 NCAA Division I men's basketball rankings
