= Jake Nevin Field House =

Arena in Villanova, Pennsylvania

Coordinates: 40.0337°N 75.3383°W

- Interactive map of Jake Nevin Field House
- Former names: Villanova Field House (1932–85)
- Location: Villanova University; Villanova, PA 19085
- Owner: Villanova University
- Capacity: 1,500
- Surface: Maple
- Public transit: SEPTA Metro: (Stadium)

Construction
- Opened: 1932

Tenants
- Villanova Wildcats; Men's basketball (1932–86); Women's basketball (2017–18); Volleyball

The Jake Nevin Field House (originally known as the Villanova Field House) is an arena located at Villanova University in Villanova, Pennsylvania. The arena, built in 1932, is the former home of the Villanova men's basketball program prior to the construction of the venue now known as Finneran Pavilion in 1986. It currently houses the women's volleyball team, as well as the intramural sports program and the main athletic offices for the school.

The building, originally known as the Villanova Field House, was renamed in 1985 in honor of Jake Nevin, longtime Villanova athletic trainer. It has permanent seating for 1,500 in the sideline balconies of the building, and can accommodate more with temporary seating on the floor of the arena.

With Finneran Pavilion closed for renovations during the 2017–18 season, the Villanova women's basketball team played its entire home schedule that season at the Field House. The men's basketball team hosted Penn in a game played on November 29, 2017. It was the first game for the men's team in the facility since 1986.
