= 2017–18 FIU Panthers women's basketball team =

Intercollegiate basketball season

2017–18 FIU Panthers women's basketball
- Conference: Conference USA
- Record: 8–21 (5–11 C-USA)
- Head coach: Tiara Malcom (2nd season)
- Assistant coaches: Keunta Miles; Gabe Lazo; Joe Silvestri
- Home arena: FIU Arena

2017–18 Conference USA women's basketball standings
	Conf.				Overall
Team	W		L	PCT	W		L	PCT
UAB	13	–	3	.813	27	–	7	.794
Western Kentucky †	12	–	4	.750	24	–	9	.727
Rice	10	–	6	.625	23	–	10	.697
Louisiana Tech	10	–	6	.625	19	–	12	.613
Middle Tennessee	10	–	6	.625	18	–	13	.581
Charlotte	10	–	6	.625	14	–	16	.467
UTEP	7	–	9	.438	17	–	14	.548
Florida Atlantic	7	–	9	.438	13	–	15	.464
Southern Miss	7	–	9	.438	15	–	15	.500
North Texas	6	–	10	.375	17	–	14	.548
UTSA	6	–	10	.375	9	–	21	.300
Old Dominion	6	–	10	.375	8	–	23	.258
FIU	5	–	11	.313	8	–	21	.276
Marshall	3	–	13	.188	9	–	20	.310
† 2018 C-USA tournament winner As of 20 March 2018; Rankings from AP poll

The 2017–18 FIU Panthers women's basketball team represented Florida International University during the 2017–18 NCAA Division I women's basketball season. The Panthers, led by second year head coach Tiara Malcom, played their home games at FIU Arena, and were members of Conference USA. They finished the season 8–21, 5–11 in C-USA play to finish in thirteenth place. They failed to qualify for the Conference USA women's tournament.

== Roster ==
2017–18 FIU Panthers women's basketball team
Players
Coaches

Pos.	#	Name	Height	Year	Previous school	Hometown
F	0	Elizabeth Toye	6 ft 0 in (1.83 m)	RS So	Lindblom Academy; Wisconsin	Chicago, IL
G	1	Kiandre'a Pound	6 ft 0 in (1.83 m)	RS Jr	Sebastian River HS	Vero Beach, FL
G	2	Cabria Lee	5 ft 8 in (1.73 m)	Fr	Northeast HS	Lake Worth, FL
G	3	Lauryn Snipes	5 ft 11 in (1.8 m)	Fr	Wellington HS	Wellington, KS
G	5	Kayla Rogers	5 ft 8 in (1.73 m)	So	Jean Ribault	Jacksonville, FL
G	10	TaMiracle Taylor	5 ft 8 in (1.73 m)	Fr	Fort Lauderdale HS	Fort Lauderdale, FL
F	12	Quira Demery	5 ft 10 in (1.78 m)	RS Sr	Millwood HS; Central Florida	Oklahoma City, OK
G	15	Kristian Hudson	5 ft 5 in (1.65 m)	Jr	Clay-Chalkville HS	Birmingham, AL
G	21	Alexis Gordon	5 ft 8 in (1.73 m)	So	Covenant Christian	Palm Bay, FL
F	23	Callie Cavanaugh	6 ft 1 in (1.85 m)	Fr	Holyoke HS	Holyoke, MA
F	34	Shante Walker	5 ft 11 in (1.8 m)	Fr	South Broward HS	West Park, FL
C		Chelsea Guimaraes (redshirt)	6 ft 3 in (1.91 m)	Jr	Professor José Augusto Lucas; Georgia Tech	Almada, Portugal

Head coach

- Tiara Malcom (Delaware)

Assistant coach(es)

- Keunta Miles (North Florida)
- Gabe Lazo (Barry)
- Joe Silvestri (Central Florida)

Legend

- (C) Team captain
- (S) Suspended
- (I) Ineligible
- (W) Walk-on
- Injured
- Current redshirt

Roster
Last update: December 28, 2017

== Schedule ==
Date time, TV	Rank^{#}	Opponent^{#}	Result	Record	Site (attendance) city, state
Non-conference regular season
11/10/2017*; 6:00 pm, ACCN Extra		at Miami (FL)	L 69–77	0–1	Watsco Center (1,073); Coral Gables, FL
11/13/2017*; 7:00 pm		Bethune–Cookman	L 59–77	0–2	FIU Arena (594); Miami, FL
11/15/2017*; 7:00 pm		Florida Gulf Coast	L 52–88	0–3	FIU Arena (360); Miami, FL
11/19/2017*; 2:00 pm		Air Force	W 70–69	1–3	FIU Arena (310); Miami, FL
11/25/2017*; 12:00 pm		Alabama A&M; 2017 Thanksgiving Tournament	L 51–58	1–4	FIU Arena (421); Miami, FL
11/26/2017*; 2:00 pm		Charleston Southern; 2017 Thanksgiving Tournament	W 77–70	2–4	FIU Arena (364); Miami, FL
11/29/2017*; 7:00 pm		at Georgetown	L 56–77	2–5	McDonough Gymnasium (239); Washington, D.C.
12/02/2017*; 7:00 pm		at Howard	L 62–69	2–6	Burr Gymnasium (150); Washington, D.C.
12/04/2017*; 5:30 pm		at Morgan State	L 51–62	2–7	Talmadge L. Hill Field House; Baltimore, MD
12/17/2017*; 3:00 pm		vs. No. 22 South Florida	L 52–82	2–8	Rick Case Arena (350); Fort Lauderdale, FL
12/20/2017*; 12:00 pm		North Dakota State; 2017 Holiday Tournament	L 68–71	2–9	FIU Arena (284); Miami, FL
12/21/2017*; 2:00 pm		Clemson; 2017 Holiday Tournament	L 65–67	2–10	FIU Arena (281); Miami, FL
12/30/2017*; 1:00 pm		Vermont	W 80–70	3–10	FIU Arena (216); Miami, FL
Conference USA regular season
01/05/2018; 7:00 pm		UTEP	L 76–77	3–11 (0–1)	FIU Arena (289); Miami, FL
01/07/2018; 2:00 pm		Marshall	W 67–54	4–11 (1–1)	FIU Arena (327); Miami, FL
01/11/2018; 8:00 pm		at Western Kentucky	L 47–101	4–12 (1–2)	E. A. Diddle Arena (1,126); Bowling Green, KY
01/13/2018; 7:00 pm		Rice	W 68–58	5–12 (2–2)	FIU Arena (346); Miami, FL
01/18/2018; 12:00 pm, ESPN3		Louisiana Tech	W 57–54	6–12 (3–2)	FIU Arena (2,151); Miami, FL
01/25/2018; 7:00 pm		UAB	L 61–71	6–13 (3–3)	FIU Arena (505); Miami, FL
01/28/2018; 1:00 pm		at Marshall	L 75–78	6–14 (3–4)	Cam Henderson Center (1,018); Huntington, WV
02/02/2018; 11:00 am		at Old Dominion	L 61–71	6–15 (3–5)	Ted Constant Convocation Center (1,859); Norfolk, VA
02/04/2018; 1:00 pm, ESPN3		at Charlotte	L 57–80	6–16 (3–6)	Dale F. Halton Arena (778); Charlotte, NC
02/08/2018; 7:00 pm		North Texas	L 46–92	6–17 (3–7)	FIU Arena (298); Miami, FL
02/10/2018; 2:00 pm, beIN		Middle Tennessee	L 59–63	6–18 (3–8)	FIU Arena (327); Miami, FL
02/14/2018; 9:00 pm		at UTSA	L 66–69	6–19 (3–9)	Convocation Center (395); San Antonio, TX
02/17/2018; 2:00 pm		Florida Atlantic	W 86–65	7–19 (4–9)	FIU Arena (433); Miami, FL
02/25/2018; 2:00 pm		at Florida Atlantic	L 63–67	7–20 (4–10)	FAU Arena (569); Boca Raton, FL
03/01/2018; 9:00 pm		at UTEP	L 70–86	7–21 (4–11)	Don Haskins Center (655); El Paso, TX
03/03/2018; 3:00 pm		at Southern Miss	W 74–70	8–21 (5–11)	Reed Green Coliseum (1,322); Hattiesburg, MS
*Non-conference game. ^{#}Rankings from AP Poll. (#) Tournament seedings in parentheses. All times are in Eastern Time.

== See also ==
2017–18 FIU Panthers men's basketball team
