= 2017–18 Louisiana Tech Lady Techsters basketball team =

Intercollegiate basketball season

2017–18 Louisiana Tech Lady Techsters basketball

WNIT, First Round
- Conference: Conference USA
- Record: 19–12 (10–6 C-USA)
- Head coach: Brooke Stoehr & Scott Stoehr (2nd season)
- Assistant coaches: Lindsey Hicks; Alaura Sharp
- Home arena: Thomas Assembly Center

2017–18 Conference USA women's basketball standings
	Conf.				Overall
Team	W		L	PCT	W		L	PCT
UAB	13	–	3	.813	27	–	7	.794
Western Kentucky †	12	–	4	.750	24	–	9	.727
Rice	10	–	6	.625	23	–	10	.697
Louisiana Tech	10	–	6	.625	19	–	12	.613
Middle Tennessee	10	–	6	.625	18	–	13	.581
Charlotte	10	–	6	.625	14	–	16	.467
UTEP	7	–	9	.438	17	–	14	.548
Florida Atlantic	7	–	9	.438	13	–	15	.464
Southern Miss	7	–	9	.438	15	–	15	.500
North Texas	6	–	10	.375	17	–	14	.548
UTSA	6	–	10	.375	9	–	21	.300
Old Dominion	6	–	10	.375	8	–	23	.258
FIU	5	–	11	.313	8	–	21	.276
Marshall	3	–	13	.188	9	–	20	.310
† 2018 C-USA tournament winner As of 20 March 2018; Rankings from AP poll

The 2017–18 Louisiana Tech Lady Techsters basketball team represented the Louisiana Tech University during the 2017–18 NCAA Division I women's basketball season. The Lady Techsters, led by second year co-head coaches Brooke Stoehr and Scott Stoehr, played their home games at Thomas Assembly Center and were members of Conference USA. They finished the season 19–12, 10–6 in C-USA play to finish in a 4-way tie for third place. They lost in the quarterfinals of the C-USA women's tournament to North Texas. They received an at-large bid to the Women's National Invitation Tournament where they lost to Missouri State in the first round.

== Roster ==
2017–18 Louisiana Tech Lady Techsters women's basketball team
Players
Coaches

Pos.	#	Name	Height	Year	Previous school	Hometown
G	1	Raizel Guinto	5 ft 7 in (1.7 m)	Fr	Sisler HS	Winnipeg, MB
G	3	Kierra Lang	5 ft 9 in (1.75 m)	So	Springdale HS	Springdale, AR
G	4	Kierra Anthony	5 ft 6 in (1.68 m)	Jr	New Iberia HS	New Iberia, LA
G	10	Amber Dixon	5 ft 9 in (1.75 m)	Fr	Mansfield Summit	Arlington, TX
G	12	Daria McCutcheon	5 ft 8 in (1.73 m)	So	Plano East HS	Plano, TX
G	14	Anna McLeod	6 ft 0 in (1.83 m)	RS So	Homeschooled	Houston, TX
F	15	MaKayla Johnson	6 ft 2 in (1.88 m)	Fr	Crowley	Crowley, TX
G	22	Maria Delgado	5 ft 9 in (1.75 m)	Jr	Northeastern Oklahoma A&M	Bucaramanga, Colombia
F	23	Reauna Cleaver	6 ft 2 in (1.88 m)	Jr	Elizabethtown HS	Elizabethtown, KY
G	24	Taylor Stahly	5 ft 7 in (1.7 m)	Jr	Newton HS; Hutchinson CC	Newton, KS
G	25	Nikki McDonald	6 ft 0 in (1.83 m)	RS So	Wesleyan; Elon	Atlanta, GA
F	32	Zhanae Whitney	6 ft 0 in (1.83 m)	Jr	Colleville Heritage HS; Collin County	Queens, NY
F	34	Alexus Malone	6 ft 0 in (1.83 m)	RS Sr	Buffalo	Oxford, MS

Head coach

- Brooke Stoehr (Louisiana Tech)
- Scott Stoehr (Little Rock)

Assistant coach(es)

- Lindsey Hicks (Purdue)
- Alaura Sharp (Southwest Minnesota State)

Legend

- (C) Team captain
- (S) Suspended
- (I) Ineligible
- (W) Walk-on
- Injured
- Current redshirt

Roster
Last update: December 23, 2017

== Schedule ==
Date time, TV	Rank^{#}	Opponent^{#}	Result	Record	Site city, state
Non-conference regular season
November 10*; 11:00 a.m.		Grambling State	W 64–53	1–0	Thomas Assembly Center (4,811); Ruston, LA
November 12*; 2:00 p.m.		LSU–Alexandria	W 87–47	2–0	Thomas Assembly Center (1,563); Ruston, LA
November 16*; 6:30 p.m.		Memphis	W 65–40	3–0	Thomas Assembly Center (1,851); Ruston, LA
November 19*; 6:00 p.m.		at Auburn	L 59–75	3–1	Auburn Arena (1,879); Auburn, AL
November 24*; 7:45 p.m.		vs. Penn State; South Point Thanksgiving Shootout	W 71–59	4–1	South Point Arena; Las Vegas, NV
November 26*; 11:00 p.m.		vs. Niagara; South Point Thanksgiving Shootout	L 67–73	4–2	South Point Arena; Las Vegas, NV
November 30*; 7:00 p.m.		at Texas	L 54–88	4–3	Frank Erwin Center (2,956); Austin, TX
December 4*; 6:30 p.m.		Clemson	L 47–55	4–4	Thomas Assembly Center (2,129); Ruston, LA
December 7*; 6:30 p.m.		at Little Rock	W 58–49	5–4	Jack Stephens Center (1,141); Little Rock, AR
December 11*; 6:30 p.m.		Louisiana–Monroe	W 71–49	6–4	Thomas Assembly Center (2,045); Ruston, LA
December 18*; 6:30 p.m.		McNeese State	W 78–62	7–4	Thomas Assembly Center (1,823); Ruston, LA
December 21*; 6:30 p.m.		Houston Baptist	W 85–62	8–4	Thomas Assembly Center (1,659); Ruston, LA
December 29*; 6:30 p.m.		Alcorn State	W 87–50	9–4	Thomas Assembly Center (1,555); Ruston, LA
Conference USA regular season
January 3; 6:30 p.m.		North Texas	W 61–53	10–4 (1–0)	Thomas Assembly Center (1,749); Ruston, LA
January 5; 6:30 p.m.		UTSA	W 63–55	11–4 (2–0)	Thomas Assembly Center (1,735); Ruston, LA
January 11; 6:00 p.m.		at Southern Miss	L 50–65	11–5 (2–1)	Reed Green Coliseum (1,264); Hattiesburg, MS
January 13; 12:00 p.m.		at Marshall	W 74–65	12–5 (3–1)	Cam Henderson Center (483); Huntington, WV
January 18; 11:00 a.m., ESPN3		at FIU	L 54–57	12–6 (3–2)	FIU Arena (2,151); Miami, FL
January 20; 6:00 p.m.		at Florida Atlantic	L 72–86	12–7 (3–3)	FAU Arena (804); Boca Raton, FL
January 26; 6:30 p.m.		Old Dominion	W 59–45	13–7 (4–3)	Thomas Assembly Center (2,229); Ruston, LA
January 28; 2:00 p.m.		Western Kentucky	L 64–74	13–8 (4–4)	Thomas Assembly Center (2,134); Ruston, LA
February 1; 6:30 p.m., ESPN3		at Middle Tennessee	W 66–49	14–8 (5–4)	Murphy Center (3,436); Murfreesboro, TN
February 4; 2:00 p.m.		UAB	L 61–66	14–9 (5–5)	Thomas Assembly Center (2,032); Ruston, LA
February 7; 6:30 p.m.		Rice	W 75–55	15–9 (6–5)	Thomas Assembly Center (2,039); Ruston, LA
February 10; 2:00 p.m.		at UTEP	W 65–62	16–9 (7–5)	Don Haskins Center (1,104); El Paso, TX
February 15; 4:30 p.m.		Charlotte	L 51–64	16–10 (7–6)	Thomas Assembly Center (3,562); Ruston, LA
February 17; 2:30 p.m.		Southern Miss	W 89–57	17–10 (8–6)	Thomas Assembly Center (4,748); Ruston, LA
February 24; 2:00 p.m.		at UAB	W 70–60	18–10 (9–6)	Bartow Arena (517); Birmingham, AL
March 1; 5:00 p.m.		at Rice	W 70–62	19–10 (10–6)	Tudor Fieldhouse (1,514); Houston, TX
Conference USA Women's Tournament
March 8; 2:30 p.m.	(3)	vs. (11) North Texas; Quarterfinals	L 69–76	19–11	The Ford Center at The Star; Frisco, TX
WNIT
March 15*; 6:30 p.m.		Missouri State; First Round	L 59–63	19–12	Thomas Assembly Center (1,734); Ruston, LA
*Non-conference game. ^{#}Rankings from AP Poll. (#) Tournament seedings in parentheses. All times are in Central Time.

== See also ==
2017–18 Louisiana Tech Bulldogs basketball team
