= 2017–18 Rice Owls women's basketball team =

Intercollegiate basketball season

2017–18 Rice Owls women's basketball

WNIT, Second Round
- Conference: Conference USA
- Record: 23–10 (10–6 C-USA)
- Head coach: Tina Langley (3rd season)
- Assistant coaches: Lee Aduddell; Tasha Brown; Winston Gandy
- Home arena: Tudor Fieldhouse

2017–18 Conference USA women's basketball standings
	Conf.				Overall
Team	W		L	PCT	W		L	PCT
UAB	13	–	3	.813	27	–	7	.794
Western Kentucky †	12	–	4	.750	24	–	9	.727
Rice	10	–	6	.625	23	–	10	.697
Louisiana Tech	10	–	6	.625	19	–	12	.613
Middle Tennessee	10	–	6	.625	18	–	13	.581
Charlotte	10	–	6	.625	14	–	16	.467
UTEP	7	–	9	.438	17	–	14	.548
Florida Atlantic	7	–	9	.438	13	–	15	.464
Southern Miss	7	–	9	.438	15	–	15	.500
North Texas	6	–	10	.375	17	–	14	.548
UTSA	6	–	10	.375	9	–	21	.300
Old Dominion	6	–	10	.375	8	–	23	.258
FIU	5	–	11	.313	8	–	21	.276
Marshall	3	–	13	.188	9	–	20	.310
† 2018 C-USA tournament winner As of 20 March 2018; Rankings from AP poll

The 2017–18 Rice Owls women's basketball team represented Rice University during the 2017–18 NCAA Division I women's basketball season. The Owls, led by third-year head coach Tina Langley, played their home games at the Tudor Fieldhouse and were members of Conference USA. They finished the season 23–10, 10–6 in C-USA play to finish in a four-way tie for third place. They advanced to the semifinals of the C-USA women's tournament, where they lost to UAB. They revived an at-large bid to the Women's National Invitation Tournament, where they defeated Texas State in the first round before losing to New Mexico in the second round.

== Previous season ==
The Owls finished the season 22–13, 8–10 in C-USA play to finish in a three-way tie for eighth place. They advanced to the quarterfinals of the C-USA women's tournament, where they lost to Middle Tennessee. They were invited to the WBI, where they defeat Lamar, Texas–Rio Grande Valley, Idaho and UNC Greensboro, to become champions of the Women's Basketball Invitational.

== Roster ==
2017–18 Rice Owls women's basketball team
Players
Coaches

Pos.	#	Name	Height	Year	Previous school	Hometown
G	1	Tayler Bennett	5 ft 7 in (1.7 m)	So	St. Anthony HS	Long Beach, CA
G	2	Sydne Wiggins	5 ft 11 in (1.8 m)	Fr	Harrison HS	Powder Springs, GA
G	5	Lauren Grigsby	5 ft 10 in (1.78 m)	Jr	Dekaney HS	Spring, TX
G	10	Wendy Knight	5 ft 9 in (1.75 m)	Sr	Reagan HS	San Antonio, TX
G	13	Erica Ogwumike	5 ft 9 in (1.75 m)	RS So	Cypress Woods HS; Pepperdine	Cypress, TX
G	20	Shani Rainey	5 ft 10 in (1.78 m)	Sr	Lovejoy HS	Fairview, TX
G	21	Gabrielle Stanton	5 ft 7 in (1.7 m)	Jr	Kingwood HS	Kingwood, TX
G/F	22	Nicole Iademarco	6 ft 1 in (1.85 m)	RS Jr	The Woodlands HS; Arizona State	The Woodlands, TX
F/C	23	Alexah Chrisman	6 ft 2 in (1.88 m)	Fr	McAuley HS	Lawrenceburg, IN
F	24	Temi Alao	5 ft 10 in (1.78 m)	Fr	Allen HS	Allen, TX
G	25	Kendall Ellig	5 ft 7 in (1.7 m)	So	Liberty Christian School	Flower Mound, TX
F	30	Olivia Ogwumike	5 ft 11 in (1.8 m)	RS Jr	Cypress Woods HS; Pepperdine	Cypress, TX
C	32	Nancy Mulkey (redshirt)	6 ft 9 in (2.06 m)	So	Cypress Woods HS; Oklahoma	Cypress, TX
C	40	Gabby Ozoude	6 ft 2 in (1.88 m)	So	Bellbrook HS	Bellbrook, OH

Head coach

- Tina Langley (West Alabama)

Assistant coach(es)

- Lee Aduddell (Abilene Christian)
- Tasha Brown (St. Ambrose)
- Winston Gandy (Maryland)

Legend

- (C) Team captain
- (S) Suspended
- (I) Ineligible
- (W) Walk-on
- Injured
- Current redshirt

Roster
Last update: December 23, 2017

== Schedule ==
Date time, TV	Rank^{#}	Opponent^{#}	Result	Record	Site (attendance) city, state
Non-conference regular season
November 10*; 3:00 p.m.		at Grand Canyon	W 69–59	1–0	GCU Arena (818); Phoenix, AZ
November 12*; 2:00 p.m.		at Northern Arizona	W 88–83	2–0	Walkup Skydome (297); Flagstaff, AZ
November 18*; 2:00 p.m.		Houston Baptist	W 67–45	3–0	Tudor Fieldhouse (576); Houston, TX
November 21*; 6:30 p.m.		at Sam Houston State	W 79–50	4–0	Bernard Johnson Coliseum (554); Huntsville, TX
November 24*; 2:00 p.m.		Little Rock	W 58–51	5–0	Tudor Fieldhouse (336); Houston, TX
November 26*; 1:00 p.m., ESPN3		at Kansas	L 65–73	5–1	Allen Fieldhouse (1,546); Lawrence, KS
November 29*; 7:00 p.m.		at No. 18 Texas A&M	L 76–82	5–2	Reed Arena (3,009); College Station, TX
December 9*; 2:00 p.m.		Incarnate Word	W 60–43	6–2	Tudor Fieldhouse (562); Houston, TX
December 14*; 7:00 p.m.		Louisiana–Monroe	W 63–47	7–2	Tudor Fieldhouse (423); Houston, TX
December 18*; 7:00 p.m.		at Texas A&M–Corpus Christi	W 67–56	8–2	American Bank Center (331); Corpus Christi, TX
December 21*; 2:00 p.m.		at Prairie View A&M	W 88–68	9–2	William J. Nicks Building (110); Prairie View, TX
December 30*; 2:00 p.m., ESPN3		Columbia	W 67–44	10–2	Tudor Fieldhouse (802); Houston, TX
Conference USA regular season
January 5; 7:00 p.m., beIN		at North Texas	W 50–49	11–2 (1–0)	UNT Coliseum (1,211); Denton, TX
January 7; 2:00 p.m.		UTSA	W 83–52	12–2 (2–0)	Tudor Fieldhouse (651); Houston, TX
January 11; 6:00 p.m.		at Florida Atlantic	W 67–53	13–2 (3–0)	FAU Arena (879); Boca Raton, FL
January 13; 6:00 p.m.		at FIU	L 58–68	13–3 (3–1)	FIU Arena (346); Miami, FL
January 20; 6:00 p.m.		at Charlotte	W 62–55	14–3 (4–1)	Dale F. Halton Arena (802); Charlotte, NC
January 26; 7:00 p.m.		UTEP	W 56–42	15–3 (5–1)	Tudor Fieldhouse (681); Houston, TX
January 28; 2:00 p.m., ESPN3		Old Dominion	W 53–45	16–3 (6–1)	Tudor Fieldhouse (643); Houston, TX
February 1; 7:00 p.m., beIN		Southern Miss	W 62–56	17–3 (7–1)	Tudor Fieldhouse (626); Houston, TX
February 7; 6:30 p.m.		at Louisiana Tech	L 55–75	17–4 (7–2)	Thomas Assembly Center (2,039); Ruston, LA
February 10; 2:00 p.m.		Western Kentucky	W 73–58	18–4 (8–2)	Tudor Fieldhouse (945); Houston, TX
February 15; 6:00 p.m.		at UAB	L 63–70	18–5 (8–3)	Bartow Arena (597); Birmingham, AL
February 17; 2:00 p.m., ESPN3		at Middle Tennessee	L 41–51	18–6 (8–4)	Murphy Center (4,235); Murfreesboro, TN
February 22; 7:00 p.m.		Marshall	W 87–44	19–6 (9–4)	Tudor Fieldhouse (586); Houston, TX
February 25; 2:00 p.m.		at UTSA	L 58–62	19–7 (9–5)	Convocation Center (609); San Antonio, TX
March 1; 5:00 p.m.		Louisiana Tech	L 62–70	19–8 (9–6)	Tudor Fieldhouse (1,514); Houston, TX
March 3; 4:30 p.m., ESPN3		North Texas	W 47–45	20–8 (10–6)	Tudor Fieldhouse (3,524); Houston, TX
Conference USA Women's Tournament
March 7; 11:30 a.m.	(5)	vs. (12) Old Dominion; First Round	W 70–48	21–8	The Ford Center at The Star; Frisco, TX
March 8; 11:30 a.m.	(5)	vs. (4) Middle Tennessee; Quarterfinals	W 61–53	22–8	The Ford Center at The Star; Frisco, TX
March 9; 5:30 p.m., Stadium	(5)	vs. (1) UAB; Semifinals	L 55–67	22–9	The Ford Center at The Star; Frisco, TX
WNIT
March 15*; 7:00 p.m.		Texas State; First Round	W 71–60	23–9	Tudor Fieldhouse (320); Houston, TX
March 20*; 8:00 p.m.		at New Mexico; Second Round	L 73–93	23–10	Dreamstyle Arena (3,302); Albuquerque, NM
*Non-conference game. ^{#}Rankings from AP Poll. (#) Tournament seedings in parentheses. All times are in Central Time.

== See also ==
- 2017–18 Rice Owls men's basketball team
