= 2017–18 Old Dominion Monarchs women's basketball team =

Intercollegiate basketball season

2017–18 Old Dominion Monarchs women's basketball
- Conference: Conference USA
- Record: 8–23 (6–10 C-USA)
- Head coach: Nikki McCray-Penson (1st season)
- Assistant coaches: Ed Baldwin (1st season); Richard Fortune (4th season); Brittany Young (1st season)
- Home arena: Ted Constant Convocation Center

2017–18 Conference USA women's basketball standings
	Conf.				Overall
Team	W		L	PCT	W		L	PCT
UAB	13	–	3	.813	27	–	7	.794
Western Kentucky †	12	–	4	.750	24	–	9	.727
Rice	10	–	6	.625	23	–	10	.697
Louisiana Tech	10	–	6	.625	19	–	12	.613
Middle Tennessee	10	–	6	.625	18	–	13	.581
Charlotte	10	–	6	.625	14	–	16	.467
UTEP	7	–	9	.438	17	–	14	.548
Florida Atlantic	7	–	9	.438	13	–	15	.464
Southern Miss	7	–	9	.438	15	–	15	.500
North Texas	6	–	10	.375	17	–	14	.548
UTSA	6	–	10	.375	9	–	21	.300
Old Dominion	6	–	10	.375	8	–	23	.258
FIU	5	–	11	.313	8	–	21	.276
Marshall	3	–	13	.188	9	–	20	.310
† 2018 C-USA tournament winner As of 20 March 2018; Rankings from AP poll

The 2017–18 Old Dominion Monarchs women’s basketball team represented Old Dominion University during the 2017–18 NCAA Division I women's basketball season. The Monarchs, led by first-year head coach Nikki McCray-Penson, played their home games at Ted Constant Convocation Center and were members of Conference USA.

They finished the season 8–23, 6–10 in C-USA play to finish in a 3-way tie for tenth place. They lost in the first round of the C-USA women's tournament to Rice.

== Previous season ==
The Monarchs finished the 2016–17 season 17-14, 11–7 in C-USA play to finish in sixth place. They defeated UTEP in the first round of the C-USA tournament before losing to Southern Miss in the quarterfinals. The Lady Monarchs did not participate in the postseason.

== Preseason ==
Head coach Karen Barefoot resigned on May 3 to take the same position at UNC Wilmington. On May 24, Old Dominion announced the hiring of McCray-Penson, then a South Carolina assistant coach.

== Roster ==
2017–18 Old Dominion Monarchs women's basketball team
Players
Coaches

Pos.	#	Name	Height	Year	Previous school	Hometown
G	0	Kelly Loftus	5 ft 10 in (1.78 m)	RS Sr	Mount Vernon; Hofstra	Alexandria, Virginia
G	2	MaKayla Timmons	5 ft 7 in (1.7 m)	Jr	Columbia Central	Columbia, TN
G	3	Carolina Bernardeco	5 ft 6 in (1.68 m)	Jr	Escola Secundária de Santo André	Lisbon, Portugal
F	4	Jessica Munoz	6 ft 2 in (1.88 m)	So	Central Heights	Nacogdoches, TX
G	5	Victoria Morris	5 ft 8 in (1.73 m)	Fr	North College Hill	Cincinnati, OH
G	11	Taylor Edwards	5 ft 9 in (1.75 m)	So	Woodrow Wilson	Portsmouth, VA
F	14	Dejah Carter	6 ft 2 in (1.88 m)	Fr	Cosby	Chesterfield, VA
F	24	Carley Brew	6 ft 0 in (1.83 m)	RS Jr	Wilson; James Madison	Wyomissing, PA
G	30	Ashley Jackson	5 ft 9 in (1.75 m)	Sr	Ridgeway	Memphis, TN
F	32	Lovie Harden	6 ft 0 in (1.83 m)	Fr	Tucker	Richmond, VA
F	34	Odegua Oigbokie	6 ft 1 in (1.85 m)	RS Sr	Ridgeway	Memphis, TN

Head coach

- Nikki McCray-Penson (Tennessee)

Assistant coach(es)

- Ed Baldwin (North Carolina Central)
- Richard Fortune (Virginia State)
- Brittany Young (Francis Marion)

Legend

- (C) Team captain
- (S) Suspended
- (I) Ineligible
- (W) Walk-on
- Injured
- Current redshirt

Roster
Last update: July 20, 2017

== Schedule ==
Date time, TV	Rank^{#}	Opponent^{#}	Result	Record	High points	High rebounds	High assists	Site (attendance) city, state
Exhibition
11/01/2017*; 7:00 pm		Christopher Newport	W 63–56		17 – Loftus	9 – Edwards	9 – Timmons	Ted Constant Convocation Center; Norfolk, VA
Non-conference regular season
11/10/2017*; 4:00 pm		Liberty; Preseason WNIT first round	L 55–63	0–1	14 – Oigbokie	8 – Jackson	4 – Timmons	Ted Constant Convocation Center (1,584); Norfolk, VA
11/17/2017*; 2:30 pm		at George Mason; Preseason WNIT Consolation Round	L 53–66	0–2	18 – Jackson	6 – 2 tied	2 – 3 tied	EagleBank Arena (523); Fairfax, VA
11/18/2017*; 12:00 pm		vs. Saint Francis (PA); Preseason WNIT Consolation Round	L 68–79	0–3	16 – Morris	9 – Oigbokie	3 – Edwards	EagleBank Arena (177); Fairfax, VA
11/20/2017*; 7:00 pm		NC State	L 56–73	0–4	15 – 2 tied	4 – Edwards	8 – Timmons	Ted Constant Convocation Center (1,706); Norfolk, VA
11/22/2017*; 7:00 pm, ESPN3		No. 16 Duke	L 51–84	0–5	15 – Morris	5 – 2 tied	5 – Timmons	Ted Constant Convocation Center (1,960); Norfolk, VA
11/26/2017*; 2:00 pm		Richmond	L 45–54	0–6	16 – Oigbokie	8 – Oigbokie	2 – 2 tied	Ted Constant Convocation Center (1,561); Norfolk, VA
11/30/2017*; 11:00 am		Coppin State	W 75–67	1–6	20 – Morris	5 – Edwards	5 – 2 tied	Ted Constant Convocation Center (6,491); Norfolk, VA
12/03/2017*; 2:00 pm		Cincinnati	L 33–54	1–7	11 – Timmons	5 – Oigbokie	3 – Timmons	Ted Constant Convocation Center (1,809); Norfolk, VA
12/06/2017*; 6:00 pm		at VCU	L 39–68	1–8	11 – Loftus	4 – 2 tied	3 – 2 tied	Siegel Center (664); Richmond, VA
12/17/2017*; 5:00 pm		at William & Mary; Rivalry	L 58–75	1–9	16 – Jackson	11 – Oigbokie	4 – Oigbokie	Kaplan Arena (2,880); Williamsburg, VA
12/21/2017*; 7:30 pm		vs. Oakland; Las Vegas Holiday Hoops Classic	L 59–80	1–10	20 – Morris	8 – Oigbokie	4 – Timmons	South Point Arena; Paradise, NV
12/22/2017*; 5:15 pm		vs. Abilene Christian; Las Vegas Holiday Hoops Classic	L 60–74	1–11	25 – Oigbokie	6 – 2 tied	3 – Jackson	South Point Arena; Paradise, NV
12/30/2017*; 2:00 pm		South Carolina State	W 52–35	2–11	13 – Oigbokie	15 – Taylor	4 – Timmons	Ted Constant Convocation Center (1,613); Norfolk, VA
C-USA regular season
01/04/2018; 7:00 pm, beIN		UAB	L 61–74	2–12 (0–1)	19 – Morris	8 – Oigbokie	6 – Timmons	Ted Constant Convocation Center (1,353); Norfolk, VA
01/06/2018; 7:00 pm		Charlotte	L 60–63	2–13 (0–2)	18 – Timmons	7 – Jackson	6 – Timmons	Ted Constant Convocation Center (1,522); Norfolk, VA
01/11/2018; 8:00 pm		at North Texas	L 46–63	2–14 (0–3)	19 – Timmons	10 – Brew	1 – 3 tied	The Super Pit (1,028); Denton, TX
01/13/2018; 8:00 pm		at UTSA	L 56–64	2–15 (0–4)	18 – Loftus	13 – Edwards	4 – Edwards	Convocation Center (417); San Antonio, TX
01/15/2018*; 7:00 pm		at Hampton	L 42–50	2–16	10 – Edwards	7 – 2 tied	4 – Timmons	Hampton Convocation Center (3,812); Hampton, VA
01/18/2018; 7:00 pm		Marshall	W 69–53	3–16 (1–4)	20 – Jackson	9 – Jackson	7 – Timmons	Ted Constant Convocation Center (1,558); Norfolk, VA
01/20/2018; 7:00 pm		UTSA	W 69–63	4–16 (2–4)	19 – Edwards	12 – Edwards	3 – 2 tied	Ted Constant Convocation Center (1,703); Norfolk, VA
01/26/2018; 7:30 pm		at Louisiana Tech	L 45–59	4–17 (2–5)	18 – Morris	11 – Edwards	3 – Jackson	Thomas Assembly Center (2,229); Ruston, LA
01/28/2018; 3:00 pm, ESPN3		at Rice	L 45–53	4–18 (2–6)	13 – 2 tied	7 – Oigbokie	3 – Timmons	Tudor Fieldhouse (643); Houston, TX
02/02/2018; 11:00 am		FIU	W 68–60	5–18 (3–6)	24 – Morris	8 – Edwards	4 – 2 tied	Ted Constant Convocation Center (1,859); Norfolk, VA
02/08/2018; 6:30 pm, FCS		at Western Kentucky	L 48–62	5–19 (3–7)	16 – Edwards	8 – Edwards	3 – Edwards	E.A. Diddle Arena (3,568); Bowling Green, KY
02/10/2018; 3:00 pm		at Southern Miss	W 74–55	6–19 (4–7)	24 – Loftus	8 – 2 tied	6 – Timmons	Reed Green Coliseum (1,431); Hattiesburg, MS
02/14/2018; 7:00 pm		Florida Atlantic	W 59–54	7–19 (5–7)	22 – Timmons	12 – Edwards	5 – Edwards	Ted Constant Convocation Center (1,588); Norfolk, VA
02/17/2018; 2:00 pm		UTEP	W 56–52 ^{OT}	8–19 (6–7)	22 – Loftus	6 – 2 tied	8 – Timmons	Ted Constant Convocation Center (2,890); Norfolk, VA
02/22/2018; 7:00 pm, beIN		North Texas	L 52–55	8–20 (6–8)	9 – Oigbokie	6 – Jackson	3 – Morris	Ted Constant Convocation Center (1,762); Norfolk, VA
03/01/2018; 5:00 pm		at Charlotte	L 43–51	8–21 (6–9)	10 – Oigbokie	8 – Jackson	10 – Edwards	Dale F. Halton Arena (3,305); Charlotte, NC
03/03/2018; 4:00 pm		at Middle Tennessee	L 47–65	8–22 (6–10)	11 – Jackson	6 – Jackson	5 – Timmons	Murphy Center (10,050); Murfreesboro, TN
C-USA Tournament
03/07/2018; 12:30 pm	(12)	vs. (5) Rice; First Round	L 48–70	8–23	12 – Loftus	5 – 3 tied	3 – Morris	The Ford Center at The Star; Frisco, TX
*Non-conference game. ^{#}Rankings from AP Poll. (#) Tournament seedings in parentheses. All times are in Eastern Time.

- Source: Old Dominion Athletics

== See also ==
2017–18 Old Dominion Monarchs men's basketball team
