= 2017–18 UTSA Roadrunners women's basketball team =

Intercollegiate basketball season

2017–18 UTSA Roadrunners women's basketball
- Conference: Conference USA
- Record: 9–21 (6–10 C-USA)
- Head coach: Kristen Holt (1st season)
- Assistant coaches: Adam Esses; Ela Mukosiej
- Home arena: Convocation Center

2017–18 Conference USA women's basketball standings
	Conf.				Overall
Team	W		L	PCT	W		L	PCT
UAB	13	–	3	.813	27	–	7	.794
Western Kentucky †	12	–	4	.750	24	–	9	.727
Rice	10	–	6	.625	23	–	10	.697
Louisiana Tech	10	–	6	.625	19	–	12	.613
Middle Tennessee	10	–	6	.625	18	–	13	.581
Charlotte	10	–	6	.625	14	–	16	.467
UTEP	7	–	9	.438	17	–	14	.548
Florida Atlantic	7	–	9	.438	13	–	15	.464
Southern Miss	7	–	9	.438	15	–	15	.500
North Texas	6	–	10	.375	17	–	14	.548
UTSA	6	–	10	.375	9	–	21	.300
Old Dominion	6	–	10	.375	8	–	23	.258
FIU	5	–	11	.313	8	–	21	.276
Marshall	3	–	13	.188	9	–	20	.310
† 2018 C-USA tournament winner As of 20 March 2018; Rankings from AP poll

The 2017–18 UTSA Roadrunners women's basketball team represented the University of Texas at San Antonio during the 2017–18 NCAA Division I women's basketball season. The Roadrunners, led by first year head coach Kristen Holt, played their home games at the Convocation Center and were members of Conference USA. They finished the season 9–21, 6–10 in C-USA play to finish in a 3 way tie for tenth place. They advanced to the quarterfinals of the C-USA women's tournament, where they lost to Western Kentucky.

== Previous season ==
They finished the season 14–17, 10–8 in C-USA play to finish in seventh place. They lost in the first round of the C-USA women's tournament to Rice.

== Roster ==
2017–18 UTSA Roadrunners women's basketball team
Players
Coaches

Pos.	#	Name	Height	Year	Previous school	Hometown
F	1	Evelyn Omemmah	6 ft 1 in (1.85 m)	Jr	Long Island Lutheran HS; Paris JC	Kakuri Kaduna, Nigeria
G	3	Alexus Dukes	5 ft 6 in (1.68 m)	Jr	Harker Heights HS	Harker Heights, TX
G	4	Crystal Chidomere	5 ft 11 in (1.8 m)	Sr	Bush HS	Richmond, TX
G	10	Tasharian Robinson	5 ft 10 in (1.78 m)	Fr	Clear Springs HS	League City, TX
G	13	Deja Cousin	5 ft 9 in (1.75 m)	So	The Burlington School	Burlington, NC
F	15	Tîmea Tóth	6 ft 1 in (1.85 m)	So	Dunakeszi Radnóti Miklos Gimnáziuma	Dunakeszi, Hungary
F	20	Kourtney Kekec	5 ft 10 in (1.78 m)	Jr	North County HS; Mineral Area JC	Bonne Terre, MO
F	21	Marie Benson	6 ft 1 in (1.85 m)	So	Midland HS	Waco, TX
F	23	Tija Hawkins	6 ft 1 in (1.85 m)	So	Shoemaker HS	Killeen, TX
G	31	Carlie Henieman	6 ft 0 in (1.83 m)	Sr	Brennan HS	San Antonio, TX
G	33	Barbara Benson	5 ft 11 in (1.8 m)	Fr	Midway HS	Amarillo, TX
G	34	Karrington Donald	5 ft 7 in (1.7 m)	Fr	Humble HS	Humble, TX
C	40	Billie Marlow	6 ft 3 in (1.91 m)	Sr	Falcon HS; Collin JC	Copenhagen, Denmark

Head coach

- Kristen Holt (Ohio)

Assistant coach(es)

- Adam Esses (Bethany (KS))
- Ela Mukosiej (Seton Hall)

Legend

- (C) Team captain
- (S) Suspended
- (I) Ineligible
- (W) Walk-on
- Injured
- Current redshirt

Roster
Last update: 2017-12-28

== Schedule ==
Date time, TV	Rank^{#}	Opponent^{#}	Result	Record	Site (attendance) city, state
Exhibition
November 3*; 7:00 p.m.		Trinity	W 74–60		Convocation Center; San Antonio, TX
Non-conference regular season
November 10*; 7:00 p.m.		Sul Ross	W 97–47	1–0	Convocation Center (308); San Antonio, TX
November 12*; 3:00 p.m.		at Arizona State	L 42–74	1–1	Wells Fargo Arena (4,639); Tempe, AZ
November 15*; 7:00 p.m.		Texas–Arlington	L 68–69 ^{OT}	1–2	Convocation Center (265); San Antonio, TX
November 17*; 7:00 p.m., LHN		at No. 2 Texas	L 70–120	1–3	Frank Erwin Center (3,135); Austin, TX
November 24*; 4:00 p.m.		Northern Illinois; UTSA Thanksgiving Classic	L 55–69	1–4	Convocation Center (347); San Antonio, TX
November 25*; 2:00 p.m.		North Dakota; UTSA Thanksgiving Classic	L 47–60	1–5	Convocation Center (328); San Antonio, TX
December 1*; 4:30 p.m.		vs. Mississippi Valley State; Battle on the Border	W 68–55	2–5	UTRGV Fieldhouse (97); Edinburg, TX
December 2*; 3:00 p.m.		at Texas–Rio Grande Valley; Battle on the Border	L 58–70	2–6	UTRGV Fieldhouse (485); Edinburg, TX
December 5*; 7:00 p.m.		at Texas State; I-35 Rivalry	L 38–91	2–7	Strahan Coliseum (1,085); San Marcos, TX
December 16*; 7:00 p.m.		at San Diego	L 69–78	2–8	Jenny Craig Pavilion (442); San Diego, CA
December 19*; 9:00 p.m.		at Cal State Fullerton	L 46–55	2–9	Titan Gym (202); Fullerton, CA
December 29*; 7:00 p.m.		Texas A&M–Commerce	L 60–69	2–10	Convocation Center (369); San Antonio, TX
Conference USA regular season
January 5; 6:30 p.m.		at Louisiana Tech	L 55–63	2–11 (0–1)	Thomas Assembly Center (1,735); Ruston, LA
January 7; 2:00 p.m.		at Rice	L 52–83	2–12 (0–2)	Tudor Fieldhouse (651); Houston, TX
January 11; 11:00 a.m.		Middle Tennessee	L 47–62	2–13 (0–3)	Convocation Center (1,202); San Antonio, TX
January 13; 7:00 p.m.		Old Dominion	W 64–56	3–13 (1–3)	Convocation Center (417); San Antonio, TX
January 18; 11:00 a.m., FCS		at Western Kentucky	L 38–73	3–14 (1–4)	E. A. Diddle Arena (3,887); Bowling Green, KY
January 20; 6:00 p.m.		at Old Dominion	L 63–69	3–15 (1–5)	Ted Constant Convocation Center (1,703); Norfolk, VA
January 25; 7:00 p.m.		Florida Atlantic	L 65–99	3–16 (1–6)	Convocation Center (495); San Antonio, TX
January 27; 4:00 p.m.		at Southern Miss	L 60–83	3–17 (1–7)	Reed Green Coliseum (1,362); Hattiesburg, MS
February 2; 7:00 p.m.		North Texas	W 70–58	4–17 (2–7)	Convocation Center (605); San Antonio, TX
February 4; 2:00 p.m.		UTEP	L 53–66	4–18 (2–8)	Convocation Center (468); San Antonio, TX
February 8; 4:00 p.m.		at Marshall	W 72–59	5–18 (3–8)	Cam Henderson Center (427); Huntington, WV
February 10; 6:00 p.m., ESPN3		at Charlotte	L 75–88	5–19 (3–9)	Dale F. Halton Arena (1,048); Charlotte, NC
February 14; 7:00 p.m.		FIU	W 69–66	6–19 (4–9)	Convocation Center (395); San Antonio, TX
February 23; 8:00 p.m.		at UTEP	W 58–55	7–19 (5–9)	Don Haskins Center (748); El Paso, TX
February 25; 2:00 p.m.		Rice	W 62–58	8–19 (6–9)	Convocation Center (609); San Antonio, TX
March 3; 2:00 p.m.		UAB	L 66-74	8–20 (6–10)	Convocation Center (561); San Antonio, TX
C-USA Women's Tournament
March 7; 1:30 p.m.	(10)	vs. (7) Florida Atlantic; First Round	W 83–71	9–20	The Ford Center at The Star; Frisco, TX
March 8; 1:30 p.m.	(10)	vs. (2) Western Kentucky; Quarterfinals	L 50–78	9–21	The Ford Center at The Star; Frisco, TX
*Non-conference game. ^{#}Rankings from AP Poll. (#) Tournament seedings in parentheses. All times are in Central Time.

== See also ==
2017–18 UTSA Roadrunners men's basketball team
