= Tiara Malcom =

American basketball player

Biographical details
- Born: January 24, 1983 (age 43); Camp Springs, Maryland

Playing career
- 2001–2005: Delaware
- 2005–2006: GDESSA Barreiro
- Position: Forward

Coaching career (HC unless noted)
- 2006–2015: Delaware (asst.)
- 2015–2016: FIU (asst.)
- 2016–2020: FIU
- 2022–present: Villanova (asst.)

Head coaching record
- Overall: 13–45 (.224)

Accomplishments and honors

Awards
- CAA Player of the Year (2005); First-team All-CAA (2005)

Tiara Patryce Malcom (born January 24, 1983) is an American college basketball coach, who was head women's basketball coach at FIU from 2016 to 2020.

== Early life and playing career ==
After graduating from Caravel Academy in Bear, Delaware in 2001, Malcom attended the University of Delaware and played at forward for the Delaware Fightin' Blue Hens for four years under head coach Tina Martin. As a senior, Malcom was one of three team captains. Malcom averaged 16.4 points and 6.7 rebounds in her senior year of 2004–05 and helped Delaware make the WNIT.

Malcom, who completed a bachelor's degree in family and community services in 2005, and a Master's in Higher Education Administration in 2011, played one year of professional basketball for GDESSA, a team in the Portuguese Liga Feminina de Basquetebol located in Barreiro.

=== Delaware statistics ===
Legend
GP	Games played	GS	Games started	MPG	Minutes per game
FG%	Field goal percentage	3P%	3-point field goal percentage	FT%	Free throw percentage
RPG	Rebounds per game	APG	Assists per game	SPG	Steals per game
BPG	Blocks per game	PPG	Points per game	**Bold**	Career high

Year	Team	GP	Points	FG%	3P%	FT%	RPG	APG	SPG	BPG	PPG
2001–02	Delaware	30	179	40.5%	0.0%	73.3%	5.1	0.5	0.5	0.5	6.0
2002–03	Delaware	**31**	407	**50.4%**	0.0%	**81.1%**	**7.6**	0.9	**1.5**	0.8	13.1
2003–04	Delaware	29	450	49.3%	**100.0%**	75.9%	6.8	1.9	1.3	**1.4**	15.5
2004–05	Delaware	**31**	**509**	44.9%	0.0%	79.5%	6.7	**1.9**	1.2	0.9	**16.4**
Career		121	1545	47.1%	28.6%	77.8%	6.6	1.3	1.1	0.9	12.8

== Coaching career ==
Malcom returned to the University of Delaware in 2006 to become an assistant coach on Martin's staff. In nine seasons as an assistant coach, Malcom helped Delaware reach a 36–0 record in CAA play in the 2011–12 and 2012–13 seasons combined. The team featured future WNBA Rookie of the Year Elena Delle Donne. While working as assistant coach, Malcom earned a master's degree in educational administration from Delaware in 2011.

On May 13, 2015, Malcom joined Marlin Chinn's staff at FIU as assistant coach. Following Chinn's suspension for sexual harassment of a player, Malcom became acting head coach for the final two regular season games and C-USA Tournament. Malcom went 1–4 as acting coach, with the one win being in the first round of the C-USA Tournament, 61–57 over UTSA.

FIU fired Chinn on March 11, 2016, for a violation of NCAA rules and promoted Malcom to head coach on April 8.

== Head coaching record ==
Record table
Season	Team	Overall	Conference	Standing	Postseason
FIU Panthers (Conference USA) (2016–present)
2016–17	FIU	5–24	3–15	13th	
2017–18	FIU	8–21	5–11	13th	
2018–19	FIU	6–23	3–15	T-12th	
FIU:		24–92 (.207)	13–55 (.191)		
Total:		24–92 (.207)			
