= 2017–18 Marshall Thundering Herd women's basketball team =

Intercollegiate basketball season

2017–18 Marshall Thundering Herd women's basketball
- Conference: Conference USA
- Record: 9–20 (3–13 C-USA)
- Head coach: Tony Kemper (1st season)
- Assistant coaches: Katie Pate; Lazar Milinkovic; Stephanie Stoglin-Reed
- Home arena: Cam Henderson Center

2017–18 Conference USA women's basketball standings
	Conf.				Overall
Team	W		L	PCT	W		L	PCT
UAB	13	–	3	.813	27	–	7	.794
Western Kentucky †	12	–	4	.750	24	–	9	.727
Rice	10	–	6	.625	23	–	10	.697
Louisiana Tech	10	–	6	.625	19	–	12	.613
Middle Tennessee	10	–	6	.625	18	–	13	.581
Charlotte	10	–	6	.625	14	–	16	.467
UTEP	7	–	9	.438	17	–	14	.548
Florida Atlantic	7	–	9	.438	13	–	15	.464
Southern Miss	7	–	9	.438	15	–	15	.500
North Texas	6	–	10	.375	17	–	14	.548
UTSA	6	–	10	.375	9	–	21	.300
Old Dominion	6	–	10	.375	8	–	23	.258
FIU	5	–	11	.313	8	–	21	.276
Marshall	3	–	13	.188	9	–	20	.310
† 2018 C-USA tournament winner As of 20 March 2018; Rankings from AP poll

The 2017–18 Marshall Thundering Herd women's basketball team represented the Marshall University during the 2017–18 NCAA Division I women's basketball season. The Thundering Herd, led by first year head coach Tony Kemper, played their home games at the Cam Henderson Center and were members of Conference USA. They finished the season 9–20, 3–13 in C-USA play to finish in last place. They failed to qualify for the Conference USA women's tournament.

== Roster ==
2017–18 Marshall Thundering Herd women's basketball team
Players
Coaches

Pos.	#	Name	Height	Year	Previous school	Hometown
F	0	Talequia Hamilton	6 ft 0 in (1.83 m)	GS	Huntington HS; Cincinnati	Huntington, WV
F	1	Jovana Vucetic	6 ft 1 in (1.85 m)	So	Sunrise Christian Academy	Loznica, Serbia
G	2	Logan Fraley	5 ft 10 in (1.78 m)	Jr	Boyd County HS	Ashland, KY
G	4	Mychelle Johnson (redshirt)	5 ft 5 in (1.65 m)	So	St. Joseph Central Catholic HS; Middle Tennessee State	Huntington, WV
G	10	Ashley Saintigene	6 ft 2 in (1.88 m)	So	Northeast HS	Lauderdale Lakes, FL
G	11	Taylor Porter	5 ft 8 in (1.73 m)	RS Sr	Murray State	Fort Gay, WV
G/F	14	Shayna Gore	5 ft 8 in (1.73 m)	Jr	Logan HS	Logan, WV
G	15	Tana Driver	5 ft 0 in (1.52 m)	RS So	MacArthur HS	Irving, TX
F	20	Taylor Pearson	5 ft 7 in (1.7 m)	Fr	Columbus Alternative HS	Columbus, OH
F	21	Brianna Toney	5 ft 11 in (1.8 m)	Fr	Bexley HS	Bexley, OH
G/F	22	Khadaijia Brooks	5 ft 10 in (1.78 m)	Jr	Bristol Eastern HS	Bristol, CT
G	23	Kristen Mayo	5 ft 5 in (1.65 m)	Fr	East Carter	Grayson, KY
F	24	Ekaterina Zhibareva	6 ft 0 in (1.83 m)	Jr	New Mexico JC	Liski, Russia

Head coach

- Tony Kemper (Fort Hays State)

Assistant coach(es)

- Katie Pate (Coker)
- Lazar Milinkovic (Ohio)
- Stephanie Stoglin-Reed (Houston Baptist)

Legend

- (C) Team captain
- (S) Suspended
- (I) Ineligible
- (W) Walk-on
- Injured
- Current redshirt

Roster
Last update: December 27, 2017

== Schedule ==
Date time, TV	Rank^{#}	Opponent^{#}	Result	Record	Site (attendance) city, state
Non-conference regular season
11/10/2017*; 5:00 pm		Longwood	W 90–45	1–0	Cam Henderson Center (1,017); Huntington, WV
11/15/2017*; 6:00 pm		Penn State	L 65–80	1–1	Cam Henderson Center (1,017); Huntington, WV
11/19/2017*; 2:00 pm		at Cleveland State	L 76–85	1–2	Wolstein Center (217); Cleveland, OH
11/22/2017*; 5:00 pm		Ohio	L 52–54	1–3	Cam Henderson Center (757); Huntington, WV
11/26/2017*; 2:00 pm		at No. 22 Kentucky	L 39–69	1–4	Memorial Coliseum (4,726); Lexington, KY
11/30/2017*; 6:00 pm		Winthrop	W 70–40	2–4	Cam Henderson Center (515); Huntington, WV
12/02/2017*; 1:00 pm		Southern Illinois	L 59–64	2–5	Cam Henderson Center (517); Huntington, WV
12/06/2017*; 6:00 pm		Morgan State	W 73–68	3–5	Cam Henderson Center (546); Huntington, WV
12/10/2017*; 1:00 pm, SECN		at Florida	L 69–74	3–6	O'Connell Center (1,008); Gainesville, FL
12/16/2017*; 1:00 pm		Appalachian State	L 54–56	3–7	Cam Henderson Center (615); Huntington, WV
12/18/2017*; 1:00 pm		Kentucky Christian	W 111–38	4–7	Cam Henderson Center (435); Huntington, WV
12/21/2017*; 7:00 pm		at Tennessee State	W 71–65	5–7	Gentry Complex (289); Nashville, TN
12/30/2017*; 1:00 pm		Alice Lloyd	W 96–46	6–7	Cam Henderson Center (718); Huntington, WV
Conference USA regular season
01/05/2018; 7:00 pm		at Florida Atlantic	L 59–79	6–8 (0–1)	FAU Arena (755); Boca Raton, FL
01/07/2018; 2:00 pm		at FIU	L 54–67	6–9 (0–2)	FIU Arena (327); Miami, FL
01/13/2018; 1:00 pm		FIU	L 65–74	6–10 (0–3)	Cam Henderson Center (483); Huntington, WV
01/18/2018; 7:00 pm		at Old Dominion	L 53–69	6–11 (0–4)	Ted Constant Convocation Center (1,558); Norfolk, VA
01/21/2018; 1:00 pm		Western Kentucky	L 66–86	6–12 (0–5)	Cam Henderson Center (573); Huntington, WV
01/26/2018; 6:00 pm, ESPN3		Middle Tennessee	L 57–73	6–13 (0–6)	Cam Henderson Center (433); Huntington, WV
01/28/2018; 1:00 pm		FIU	W 78–75	7–13 (1–6)	Cam Henderson Center (1,018); Huntington, WV
02/02/2018; 7:00 pm		at Charlotte	L 61–67	7–14 (1–7)	Dale F. Halton Arena (865); Charlotte, NC
02/04/2018; 3:00 pm		at Southern Miss	L 61–70	7–15 (1–8)	Reed Green Coliseum (1,194); Hattiesburg, MS
02/08/2018; 5:00 pm, beIN		UTSA	L 59–72	7–16 (1–9)	Cam Henderson Center (427); Huntington, WV
02/10/2018; 1:00 pm		UAB	L 62–69	7–17 (1–10)	Cam Henderson Center (713); Huntington, WV
02/15/2018; 6:00 pm		UTEP	W 66–64	8–17 (2–10)	Cam Henderson Center (698); Huntington, WV
02/17/2018; 3:00 pm		at Western Kentucky	L 50–77	8–18 (2–11)	E. A. Diddle Arena (2,205); Bowling Green, KY
02/22/2018; 8:00 pm		at Rice	L 44–87	8–19 (2–12)	Tudor Fieldhouse (586); Houston, TX
02/24/2018; 8:00 pm, ESPN3		at North Texas	W 62–54	9–19 (3–12)	The Super Pit (1,136); Denton, TX
03/01/2018; 6:00 pm		Florida Atlantic	L 55–62	9–20 (3–13)	Cam Henderson Center (792); Huntington, WV
*Non-conference game. ^{#}Rankings from AP Poll. (#) Tournament seedings in parentheses. All times are in Eastern Time.

== See also ==
2017–18 Marshall Thundering Herd men's basketball team
