= 2017–18 UAB Blazers women's basketball team =

Intercollegiate basketball season

2017–18 UAB Blazers women's basketball

C-USA Regular Season Champions

WNIT, Second Round
- Conference: Conference USA
- Record: 27–7 (13–3 C-USA)
- Head coach: Randy Norton (5th season)
- Assistant coaches: Taren Martin; Michael Scott Jr.; Reagan Miller
- Home arena: Bartow Arena

2017–18 Conference USA women's basketball standings
	Conf.				Overall
Team	W		L	PCT	W		L	PCT
UAB	13	–	3	.813	27	–	7	.794
Western Kentucky †	12	–	4	.750	24	–	9	.727
Rice	10	–	6	.625	23	–	10	.697
Louisiana Tech	10	–	6	.625	19	–	12	.613
Middle Tennessee	10	–	6	.625	18	–	13	.581
Charlotte	10	–	6	.625	14	–	16	.467
UTEP	7	–	9	.438	17	–	14	.548
Florida Atlantic	7	–	9	.438	13	–	15	.464
Southern Miss	7	–	9	.438	15	–	15	.500
North Texas	6	–	10	.375	17	–	14	.548
UTSA	6	–	10	.375	9	–	21	.300
Old Dominion	6	–	10	.375	8	–	23	.258
FIU	5	–	11	.313	8	–	21	.276
Marshall	3	–	13	.188	9	–	20	.310
† 2018 C-USA tournament winner As of 20 March 2018; Rankings from AP poll

The 2017–18 UAB Blazers women's basketball team represented the University of Alabama at Birmingham during the 2017–18 NCAA Division I women's basketball season. The Blazers, led by fifth year head coach Randy Norton, played their home games at the Bartow Arena and were members of Conference USA. They finished the season 27–7, 13–3 in C-USA play to win the C-USA regular season. They advanced to the championship game of the C-USA women's tournament, where they lost to Western Kentucky. They received an automatic bid to the Women's National Invitation Tournament, where they defeated Chattanooga in the first round before losing to Georgia Tech in the second round.

== Roster ==
2017–18 UAB Blazers women's basketball team
Players
Coaches

Pos.	#	Name	Height	Year	Previous school	Hometown
G	0	Miyah Barnes	5 ft 5 in (1.65 m)	So	Central HS	Memphis, TN
G	2	Whytney Singleton	5 ft 6 in (1.68 m)	Sr	Blount HS	Mobile, AL
G	3	Angela Vendrell	6 ft 2 in (1.88 m)	So	CB Claret Benimaclet	Alicante, Spain
F	4	Talia Roldan	6 ft 4 in (1.93 m)	Fr	Andrean	Griffith, IN
G	12	Trista Magee	6 ft 1 in (1.85 m)	RS So	Presbyterian Christian; Alabama	Ellisville, MS
F	13	Katelynn Thomas	6 ft 0 in (1.83 m)	So	Shades Valley HS	Birmingham, AL
G	14	T'erra Lewis	5 ft 6 in (1.68 m)	Sr	Robert E. Lee HS	Montgomery, AL
G	20	Deanna Kuzmanic	5 ft 9 in (1.75 m)	Jr	Wheeling HS	Wheeling, IL
G	22	Maya Garland	5 ft 6 in (1.68 m)	RS Jr	Fenwick HS	River Forest, IL
G	23	Lea Kerstein	5 ft 8 in (1.73 m)	RS Fr	Montini Catholic HS	West Chicago, IL
G/F	24	Kara Rawls	6 ft 1 in (1.85 m)	Sr	Lawson State CC	Hoover, AL
G	32	Rachael Childress	5 ft 10 in (1.78 m)	So	Lawrence County HS	Moulton, AL
F	34	Imani Johnson	6 ft 0 in (1.83 m)	So	Desoto Central HS	Southaven, MS

Head coach

- Randy Norton (Iowa)

Assistant coach(es)

- Taren Martin (Illinois State)
- Michael Scott Jr. (Missouri)
- Reagan Miller (Liberty)

Legend

- (C) Team captain
- (S) Suspended
- (I) Ineligible
- (W) Walk-on
- Injured
- Current redshirt

Roster
Last update: December 23, 2017

== Schedule ==
Date time, TV	Rank^{#}	Opponent^{#}	Result	Record	Site (attendance) city, state
Exhibition
11/01/2017*; 6:00 pm		Montevallo	W 113–20		Bartow Arena; Birmingham, AL
11/07/2017*; 7:00 pm		Judson College	W 126–51		Bartow Arena; Birmingham, AL
Non-conference regular season
11/11/2017*; 2:00 pm		Mississippi Valley State	W 87–72	1–0	Bartow Arena (596); Birmingham, AL
11/12/2017*; 4:30 pm		Southern Illinois	W 76–66	2–0	Bartow Arena (407); Birmingham, AL
11/15/2017*; 6:00 pm		Miles College	W 85–42	3–0	Bartow Arena (292); Birmingham, AL
11/24/2017*; 2:00 pm		vs. Indiana; Hilton Concord Classic	L 63–71	3–1	McKeon Pavilion (142); Moraga, CA
11/25/2017*; 2:00 pm		vs. UC Santa Barbara; Hilton Concord Classic	W 67–54	4–1	McKeon Pavilion (152); Moraga, CA
12/01/2017*; 11:00 am		at Appalachian State	W 70–59	5–1	Holmes Center (466); Boone, NC
12/03/2017*; 11:00 am		at High Point	W 77–61	6–1	Millis Center (602); High Point, NC
12/07/2017*; 6:00 pm		Samford	W 77–53	7–1	Bartow Arena (497); Birmingham, AL
12/09/2017*; 3:00 pm		at Memphis	L 62–64	7–2	Elma Roane Fieldhouse (835); Memphis, TN
12/17/2017*; 4:00 pm		Alabama A&M	W 85–58	8–2	Bartow Arena (431); Birmingham, AL
12/19/2017*; 1:00 pm		Alabama State	W 61–44	9–2	Bartow Arena (475); Birmingham, AL
12/21/2017*; 1:05 pm		at South Alabama	W 78–66	10–2	Mitchell Center (242); Mobile, AL
12/30/2017*; 6:30 pm		Tuskegee	W 105–50	11–2	Bartow Arena (431); Birmingham, AL
Conference USA regular season
01/04/2018; 6:00 pm, BEIN		at Old Dominion	W 74–61	12–2 (1–0)	Ted Constant Convocation Center (1,353); Norfolk, VA
01/06/2018; 6:00 pm		at Middle Tennessee	W 59–51	13–2 (2–0)	Murphy Center (3,940); Murfreesboro, TN
01/13/2018; 6:30 pm		Western Kentucky	W 79–61	14–2 (3–0)	Bartow Arena (527); Birmingham, AL
01/18/2018; 6:00 pm		Southern Miss	L 63–80	14–3 (3–1)	Bartow Arena (357); Birmingham, AL
01/20/2018; 2:00 pm		North Texas	W 68–52	15–3 (4–1)	Bartow Arena (369); Birmingham, AL
01/25/2018; 6:00 pm		at FIU	W 71–61	16–3 (5–1)	FIU Arena (505); Miami, FL
01/27/2018; 4:00 pm, ESPN3		Florida Atlantic	W 90–57	17–3 (6–1)	Bartow Arena (647); Birmingham, AL
02/02/2018; 8:00 pm, BEIN		at UTEP	W 84–64	18–3 (7–1)	Don Haskins Center (771); El Paso, TX
02/04/2018; 2:00 pm		at Louisiana Tech	W 66–61	19–3 (8–1)	Thomas Assembly Center (2,032); Ruston, LA
02/10/2018; 12:00 pm		at Marshall	W 69–62	20–3 (9–1)	Cam Henderson Center (713); Huntington, WV
02/15/2018; 6:00 pm		Rice	W 70–63	21–3 (10–1)	Bartow Arena (597); Birmingham, AL
02/17/2018; 2:00 pm		Charlotte	L 71–80	21–4 (10–2)	Bartow Arena (427); Birmingham, AL
02/22/2018; 11:00 am		Middle Tennessee	W 65–58	22–4 (11–2)	Bartow Arena (1,011); Birmingham, AL
02/24/2018; 2:00 pm		Louisiana Tech	L 60–70	22–5 (11–3)	Bartow Arena (517); Birmingham, AL
03/01/2018; 5:00 pm		at North Texas	W 69–51	23–5 (12–3)	The Super Pit (1,310); Denton, TX
03/03/2018; 2:00 pm		at UTSA	W 74–66	24–5 (13–3)	Convocation Center (561); San Antonio, TX
Conference USA Women's Tournament
03/08/2018; 11:00 am, Stadium	(1)	vs. (9) UTEP; Quarterfinals	W 75–66	25–5	The Ford Center at The Star; Frisco, TX
03/09/2018; 5:30 pm, Stadium	(1)	vs. (5) Rice; Semifinals	W 67–55	26–5	The Ford Center at The Star; Frisco, TX
03/10/2018; 4:30 pm, CBSSN	(1)	vs. (2) WKU; Championship Game	L 57–72	26–6	The Ford Center at The Star; Frisco, TX
WNIT
03/15/2018; 6:00 pm		Chattanooga; First Round	W 60–50	27–6	Bartow Arena (769); Birmingham, AL
03/18/2018; 1:00 pm		at Georgia Tech; Second Round	L 47–91	27–7	Hank McCamish Pavilion (681); Atlanta, GA
*Non-conference game. ^{#}Rankings from AP Poll. (#) Tournament seedings in parentheses. All times are in Central Time.

== Rankings ==
2017–18 NCAA Division I women's basketball rankings

Regular season polls
Poll	Pre- Season	Week 2	Week 3	Week 4	Week 5	Week 6	Week 7	Week 8	Week 9	Week 10	Week 11	Week 12	Week 13	Week 14	Week 15	Week 16	Week 17	Week 18	Week 19	Final
AP															RV					N/A
Coaches																				

Legend
	Increase in ranking
	Decrease in ranking
	Not ranked previous week
(RV)	Received Votes
(NR)	Not Ranked

== See also ==
- 2017–18 UAB Blazers men's basketball team
