= 2017–18 Southern Miss Lady Eagles basketball team =

Intercollegiate basketball season

2017–18 Southern Miss Lady Eagles basketball
- Conference: Conference USA
- Record: 15–15 (7–9 C-USA)
- Head coach: Joye Lee-McNelis (14th season)
- Assistant coaches: Kiley Hill; Victoria Crawford; Lauren Pittman
- Home arena: Reed Green Coliseum

2017–18 Conference USA women's basketball standings
	Conf.				Overall
Team	W		L	PCT	W		L	PCT
UAB	13	–	3	.813	27	–	7	.794
Western Kentucky †	12	–	4	.750	24	–	9	.727
Rice	10	–	6	.625	23	–	10	.697
Louisiana Tech	10	–	6	.625	19	–	12	.613
Middle Tennessee	10	–	6	.625	18	–	13	.581
Charlotte	10	–	6	.625	14	–	16	.467
UTEP	7	–	9	.438	17	–	14	.548
Florida Atlantic	7	–	9	.438	13	–	15	.464
Southern Miss	7	–	9	.438	15	–	15	.500
North Texas	6	–	10	.375	17	–	14	.548
UTSA	6	–	10	.375	9	–	21	.300
Old Dominion	6	–	10	.375	8	–	23	.258
FIU	5	–	11	.313	8	–	21	.276
Marshall	3	–	13	.188	9	–	20	.310
† 2018 C-USA tournament winner As of 20 March 2018; Rankings from AP poll

The 2017–18 Southern Miss Lady Eagles basketball team represented the University of Southern Mississippi during the 2017–18 NCAA Division I women's basketball season. The Lady Eagles, led by fourteenth year head coach Joye Lee-McNelis, played their home games at Reed Green Coliseum and were members of Conference USA. They finished the season 15–15, 7–9 in C-USA play to finish in a 3-way tie for seventh place. They lost in the first round of the C-USA women's tournament to UTEP.

== Roster ==
2017–18 Southern Miss Golden Eagles women's basketball team
Players
Coaches

Pos.	#	Name	Height	Year	Previous school	Hometown
G	0	Camille Anderson (redshirt)	5 ft 9 in (1.75 m)	Jr	Buford HS; NC State	Buford, GA
G	2	Allie Kennedy	5 ft 6 in (1.68 m)	Fr	Red Bay HS	Bed Bay, AL
G	5	Shonte Hailes	5 ft 6 in (1.68 m)	So	Quitman HS	Quitman, MS
C	11	Kyle Felton	6 ft 3 in (1.91 m)	Jr	Columbus HS; Jones County JC	Lithonia, GA
G/F	12	Imani Carter	6 ft 0 in (1.83 m)	Fr	Enterprise HS	Enterprise, AL
C	15	Amber Landing	6 ft 4 in (1.93 m)	RS So	Madison-Ridgeland Academy; Little Rock	Sharon, MS
G	20	Molly Brown	5 ft 9 in (1.75 m)	Sr	Alexander HS; South Georgia Tech	Douglasville, GA
G/F	21	Jayla King	5 ft 9 in (1.75 m)	RS Sr	Pine Forest HS; South Florida	Pensacola, FL
G	22	Megan Brown	5 ft 10 in (1.78 m)	RS Jr	Salmen HS	Slidell, LA
F	24	Kennedy Gavin	6 ft 0 in (1.83 m)	Fr	Petal HS	Petal, MS
G/F	25	Alarie Mayze	5 ft 10 in (1.78 m)	So	Arlington HS; New Mexico JC	Arlington, TX
G	30	Hanah Lott	5 ft 6 in (1.68 m)	RS So	Petal HS; Jones County JC	Petal, MS
F	34	Respect Leaphart	6 ft 0 in (1.83 m)	So	Dunbar HS	Fort Myers, FL
C	42	Kelsey Jones	6 ft 3 in (1.91 m)	Fr	Starkville HS	Starkville, MS

Head coach

- Joye Lee-McNelis (Southern Miss)

Assistant coach(es)

- Kiley Hill (Arkansas Tech)
- Victoria Crawford (Memphis)
- Lauren Pittman (Southern Miss)

Legend

- (C) Team captain
- (S) Suspended
- (I) Ineligible
- (W) Walk-on
- Injured
- Current redshirt

Roster
Last update: December 27, 2017

== Schedule ==
Date time, TV	Rank^{#}	Opponent^{#}	Result	Record	Site (attendance) city, state
Exhibition
11/03/2017*; 6:00 pm		Antelope Valley	W 73–55		Reed Green Coliseum; Hattiesburg, MS
Non-conference regular season
11/10/2017*; 11:00 am		William Carey	W 82–44	1–0	Reed Green Coliseum (2,943); Hattiesburg, MS
11/14/2017*; 6:00 pm		Tulane	W 66–58	2–0	Reed Green Coliseum (1,126); Hattiesburg, MS
11/16/2017*; 6:00 pm		Mississippi Valley State	W 84–69	3–0	Reed Green Coliseum (1,244); Hattiesburg, MS
11/19/2017*; 2:00 pm		at No. 6 Mississippi State	L 56–91	3–1	Humphrey Coliseum (5,321); Starkville, MS
11/24/2017*; 6:00 pm		Alcorn State; Lady Eagle Thanksgiving Classic	W 72–67	4–1	Reed Green Coliseum; Hattiesburg, MS
11/25/2017*; 4:00 pm		Alabama State; Lady Eagle Thanksgiving Classic	W 72–35	5–1	Reed Green Coliseum (1,132); Hattiesburg, MS
11/28/2017*; 6:30 pm		at Northwestern State	W 71–59	6–1	Prather Coliseum (742); Natchitoches, LA
11/30/2017*; 6:00 pm		South Alabama	L 57–78	6–2	Reed Green Coliseum (1,243); Hattiesburg, MS
12/12/2017*; 11:00 am		at Ole Miss	L 59–68	6–3	The Pavilion at Ole Miss (8,229); Oxford, MS
12/15/2017*; 6:00 pm		Sam Houston State	W 58–38	7–3	Reed Green Coliseum (1,225); Hattiesburg, MS
12/19/2017*; 12:00 pm, ESPN3		at Samford	L 56–61	7–4	Pete Hanna Center (243); Birmingham, AL
12/21/2017*; 7:00 pm, ACCN Extra		at Georgia Tech	L 44–63	7–5	Hank McCamish Pavilion (856); Atlanta, GA
12/30/2017*; 4:00 pm		Blue Mountain	W 96–46	8–5	Reed Green Coliseum (1,101); Hattiesburg, MS
Conference USA regular season
01/04/2018; 10:30 am		at Charlotte	L 56–66	8–6 (0–1)	Dale F. Halton Arena (5,438); Charlotte, NC
01/06/2018; 2:00 pm, FCS		at Western Kentucky	L 60–81	8–7 (0–2)	E. A. Diddle Arena (1,897); Bowling Green, KY
01/11/2018; 6:00 pm		Louisiana Tech	W 65–50	9–7 (1–2)	Reed Green Coliseum (1,264); Hattiesburg, MS
01/18/2018; 6:00 pm		at UAB	W 80–63	10–7 (2–2)	Bartow Arena (357); Birmingham, AL
01/20/2018; 1:00 pm, ESPN3		at Middle Tennessee	W 61–53	11–7 (3–2)	Murphy Center (3,470); Murfreesboro, TN
01/25/2018; 6:00 pm		Charlotte	L 79–85 ^{2OT}	11–8 (3–3)	Reed Green Coliseum (1,346); Hattiesburg, MS
01/27/2018; 4:00 pm		UTSA	W 83–60	12–8 (4–2)	Reed Green Coliseum (1,362); Hattiesburg, MS
02/01/2018; 7:00 pm, beIN		at Rice	L 56–62	12–9 (4–3)	Tudor Fieldhouse (626); Houston, TX
02/04/2018; 2:00 pm		Marshall	W 70–61	13–9 (5–3)	Reed Green Coliseum (1,194); Hattiesburg, MS
02/10/2018; 2:00 pm		Old Dominion	L 55–74	13–10 (5–4)	Reed Green Coliseum (1,431); Hattiesburg, MS
02/15/2018; 5:00 pm		at North Texas	L 62–71	13–11 (5–5)	The Super Pit (1,602); Denton, TX
02/17/2018; 2:30 pm		at Louisiana Tech	L 57–89	13–12 (5–7)	Thomas Assembly Center (4,748); Ruston, LA
02/23/2018; 6:00 pm		at Florida Atlantic	L 74–89	13–13 (5–8)	FAU Arena (480); Boca Raton, FL
02/25/2018; 2:00 pm		UTEP	W 60–53	14–13 (6–8)	Reed Green Coliseum (1,310); Hattiesburg, MS
03/01/2018; 6:00 pm		Western Kentucky	W 69–63	15–13 (7–8)	Reed Green Coliseum (1,175); Hattiesburg, MS
03/03/2018; 2:00 pm		FIU	L 70–74	15–14 (7–9)	Reed Green Coliseum (1,322); Hattiesburg, MS
Conference USA Women's Tournament
03/07/2018; 11:00 am	(8)	vs. (9) UTEP; First Round	L 67–72	15–15	The Ford Center at The Star; Frisco, TX
*Non-conference game. ^{#}Rankings from AP Poll. (#) Tournament seedings in parentheses. All times are in Central Time.

== See also ==
2017–18 Southern Miss Golden Eagles basketball team
