= 2018 Conference USA women's basketball tournament =

Conference USA women's basketball tournament

- Classification: Division I
- Season: 2017–18
- Teams: 12
- Site: The Ford Center at The Star; Frisco, Texas
- Champions: Western Kentucky (3rd title)
- Winning coach: Michelle Clark-Heard (3r title)
- MVP: Tashia Brown (Western Kentucky)
- Television: Stadium, CBSSN

2017–18 Conference USA women's basketball standings
	Conf.				Overall
Team	W		L	PCT	W		L	PCT
UAB	13	–	3	.813	27	–	7	.794
Western Kentucky †	12	–	4	.750	24	–	9	.727
Rice	10	–	6	.625	23	–	10	.697
Louisiana Tech	10	–	6	.625	19	–	12	.613
Middle Tennessee	10	–	6	.625	18	–	13	.581
Charlotte	10	–	6	.625	14	–	16	.467
UTEP	7	–	9	.438	17	–	14	.548
Florida Atlantic	7	–	9	.438	13	–	15	.464
Southern Miss	7	–	9	.438	15	–	15	.500
North Texas	6	–	10	.375	17	–	14	.548
UTSA	6	–	10	.375	9	–	21	.300
Old Dominion	6	–	10	.375	8	–	23	.258
FIU	5	–	11	.313	8	–	21	.276
Marshall	3	–	13	.188	9	–	20	.310
† 2018 C-USA tournament winner As of 20 March 2018; Rankings from AP poll

The 2018 Conference USA women's basketball tournament was a postseason women's basketball tournament for the Conference USA held at The Ford Center at The Star in Frisco, Texas, from March 7 through March 10, 2018. Western Kentucky won their 3rd Conference USA tournament and earned an automatic bid to the 2018 NCAA Women's Division I Basketball Tournament.

== Seeds ==
The top twelve teams will qualify for the tournament. Teams will be seeded by record within the conference, with a tiebreaker system to seed teams with identical conference records.

Seed	School	Conference record	Overall record	Tiebreaker
1	UAB #	13–3	24–5	
2	Western Kentucky #	12–4	21–8	
3	Louisiana Tech #	10–6	19–10	0–1 vs. Charlotte, 1–0 vs. Middle Tennessee, 2–0 vs. Rice
4	Middle Tennessee #	10–6	18–11	2–0 vs. Charlotte, 0–1 vs. Louisiana Tech, 1–0 vs. Rice
5	Rice	10–6	20–8	1–0 vs. Charlotte, 0–2 vs. Louisiana Tech, 0–1 vs. Middle Tennessee
6	Charlotte	10–6	14–15	1–0 vs. Louisiana Tech, 0–2 vs. Middle Tennessee, 0–1 vs. Rice
7	Florida Atlantic	7–9	13–14	1–0 vs. Southern Miss, 1–1 vs. UTEP
8	Southern Miss	7–9	15–14	0–1 vs. Florida Atlantic, 1–0 vs. UTEP
9	UTEP	7–9	16–13	1–1 vs. Florida Atlantic, 0–1 vs. Southern Miss
10	UTSA	6–10	8–20	1–0 vs. North Texas, 1–1 vs. Old Dominion
11	North Texas	6–10	15–13	2–0 vs. Old Dominion, 0–1 vs. UTSA
12	Old Dominion	6–10	8–22	0–1 vs. North Texas, 1–1 vs. UTSA
	FIU	5–11	8–21	
	Marshall	3–13	9–20	
‡ – C–USA regular season champions, and tournament No. 1 seed. # – Received a single-bye in the conference tournament. Overall records include all games played in the regular season.

== Schedule ==
Session	Game	Time*	Matchup^{#}	Television	Attendance
First round – Wednesday, March 7
1	1	11:00 am	#8 Southern Miss vs #9 UTEP		
1	2	11:30 am	#5 Rice vs #12 Old Dominion		
2	3	1:30 pm	#7 Florida Atlantic vs #10 UTSA		
2	4	2:00 pm	#6 Charlotte vs #11 North Texas		
Quarterfinals – Thursday, March 8
3	5	11:00 am	#1 UAB vs #9 UTEP		
3	6	11:30 am	#4 Middle Tennessee vs #5 Rice		
4	7	1:30 pm	#2 Western Kentucky vs #7 Florida Atlantic		
4	8	2:00 pm	#3 Louisiana Tech vs #5 Old Dominion		
Semifinals – Friday, March 9
5	9	5:30 pm	#1 UAB vs #5 Rice	Stadium	
5	10	8:00 pm	#2 Western Kentucky vs #11 North Texas	Stadium	
Championship – Saturday, March 10
6	11	4:30 pm	#1 UAB vs #2 Western Kentucky	CBSSN	
*Game times in CT. #-Rankings denote tournament seed

== Bracket ==
The tournament took place March 7–10.

First round Wednesday, March 7
8	Southern Miss	67
9	UTEP	72
5	Rice	70
12	Old Dominion	48
7	Florida Atlantic	71
10	UTSA	83
6	Charlotte	55
11	North Texas	58

Quarterfinals; Thursday, March 8
1	UAB	75
9	UTEP	66
4	Middle Tennessee	53
5	Rice	61
2	Western Kentucky	78
10	UTSA	50
3	Louisiana Tech	69
11	North Texas	76

Semifinals; Friday, March 9
1	UAB	67
5	Rice	55
2	Western Kentucky	77
11	North Texas	61

Championship Game; Saturday, March 10; CBSSN
1	UAB	57
2	Western Kentucky	72

All times listed are Central

== See also ==
2018 Conference USA men's basketball tournament
