= 2017–18 Middle Tennessee Blue Raiders women's basketball team =

Intercollegiate basketball season

2017–18 Middle Tennessee Blue Raiders women's basketball

WNIT, First Round
- Conference: Conference USA
- Record: 18–13 (10–6 C-USA)
- Head coach: Rick Insell (13th season)
- Assistant coaches: Kim Brewton; Tom Hodges; Shalon Pillow
- Home arena: Murphy Center

2017–18 Conference USA women's basketball standings
	Conf.				Overall
Team	W		L	PCT	W		L	PCT
UAB	13	–	3	.813	27	–	7	.794
Western Kentucky †	12	–	4	.750	24	–	9	.727
Rice	10	–	6	.625	23	–	10	.697
Louisiana Tech	10	–	6	.625	19	–	12	.613
Middle Tennessee	10	–	6	.625	18	–	13	.581
Charlotte	10	–	6	.625	14	–	16	.467
UTEP	7	–	9	.438	17	–	14	.548
Florida Atlantic	7	–	9	.438	13	–	15	.464
Southern Miss	7	–	9	.438	15	–	15	.500
North Texas	6	–	10	.375	17	–	14	.548
UTSA	6	–	10	.375	9	–	21	.300
Old Dominion	6	–	10	.375	8	–	23	.258
FIU	5	–	11	.313	8	–	21	.276
Marshall	3	–	13	.188	9	–	20	.310
† 2018 C-USA tournament winner As of 20 March 2018; Rankings from AP poll

The 2017–18 Middle Tennessee Blue Raiders women's basketball team represented Middle Tennessee State University during the 2017–18 NCAA Division I women's basketball season. The Blue Raiders, led by thirteenth-year head coach Rick Insell, played their home games at the Murphy Center and were third year members of Conference USA. They finished the season 18–13, 10–6 in C-USA play to finish in a four-way tie for third place. They lost in the quarterfinals of the C-USA women's tournament to Rice. They received an at-large bid to the Women's National Invitation Tournament, where they lost to Ball State in the first round.

== Previous season ==
The team finished the season 23–11, 15–3 in C-USA play to finish in second place. They advanced to the semifinals of the C-USA women's tournament, where they lost to Southern Miss. They received an automatic bid to the Women's National Invitation Tournament, where they defeated Morehead State and Wake Forest in the first and second rounds before losing to Georgia Tech in the third round.

== Roster ==
2017–18 Middle Tennessee Blue Raiders women's basketball team
Players
Coaches

Pos.	#	Name	Height	Year	Previous school	Hometown
F	0	Alex Johnson	6 ft 0 in (1.83 m)	RS Jr	Blackman HS	Murfreesboro, TN
G	2	Zeynep Canbaz	5 ft 8 in (1.73 m)	Jr	Ozel Bostanci Doga Anadolu Lisesi; Western Nebraska CC	Istanbul, Turkey
G	3	Kyla Allison	6 ft 0 in (1.83 m)	So	Wekiva HS	Orlando, FL
G	5	Abbey Sissom	5 ft 8 in (1.73 m)	Sr	Cannon County HS	Woodbury, TN
C	11	Jadona Davis	6 ft 5 in (1.96 m)	Fr	Wayne County HS	Buckatunna, MS
G	12	Jess Louro	5 ft 10 in (1.78 m)	Jr	St. Rose HS	Wall, New Jersey
F	13	Jordan Majors	6 ft 0 in (1.83 m)	RS So	Martin Luther King HS	Nashville, TN
G	14	Katie Collier	5 ft 9 in (1.75 m)	Jr	Webb School of Knoxville	Knoxville, TN
G	15	Anna Jones	6 ft 1 in (1.85 m)	Fr	Jackson HS	Jackson, TN
F	21	LaSonja Edwards	6 ft 1 in (1.85 m)	Jr	Fort Pierce Central HS; Gulf Coast State	Fort Pierce, FL
F	23	Gabby Lyon	6 ft 0 in (1.83 m)	Sr	Science Hill HS	Johnson City, TN
F	24	Rebecca Reuter	6 ft 3 in (1.91 m)	Sr	Bradley Central HS	Cleveland, TN
F	35	Charity Savage	5 ft 0 in (1.52 m)	So	Barlett HS	Memphis, TN
C	43	Kara Meadows	6 ft 4 in (1.93 m)	Fr	Clarkrange HS	Jamestown, TN

Head coach

- Rick Insell (Middle Tennessee)

Assistant coach(es)

- Kim Brewton (Liberty)
- Tom Hodges (Tennessee Tech)
- Shalon Pillow (Tennessee)

Legend

- (C) Team captain
- (S) Suspended
- (I) Ineligible
- (W) Walk-on
- Injured
- Current redshirt

Roster
Last update: December 27, 2017

== Schedule ==
Date time, TV	Rank^{#}	Opponent^{#}	Result	Record	Site (attendance) city, state
Exhibition
10/29/2017*; 3:00 pm		Tennessee Wesleyan	W 89–34		Murphy Center; Murfreesboro, TN
11/02/2017*; 5:30 pm		Trevecca Nazarene	W 88–41		Murphy Center; Murfreesboro, TN
Non-conference regular season
11/10/2017*; 6:00 pm		at Vanderbilt	W 65–54	1–0	Memorial Gymnasium (2,866); Nashville, TN
11/14/2017*; 6:30 pm		Tennessee Tech	W 58–44	2–0	Murphy Center (3,912); Murfreesboro, TN
11/19/2017*; 2:00 pm		Lipscomb	W 72–48	3–0	Murphy Center (4,122); Murfreesboro, TN
11/26/2017*; 1:00 pm		at UNC Asheville	W 72–57	4–0	Kimmel Arena (1,323); Asheville, NC
11/29/2017*; 7:00 pm, SECN		at Ole Miss	L 56–65	4–1	The Pavilion at Ole Miss (1,112); Oxford, MS
12/03/2017*; 12:00 pm, ACCN Extra		at Georgia Tech	L 45–48	4–2	Hank McCamish Pavilion (921); Atlanta, GA
12/05/2017*; 11:00 am		Coppin State	W 69–39	5–2	Murphy Center (11,305); Murfreesboro, TN
12/09/2017*; 6:00 pm, ACCN Extra		at No. 4 Louisville	L 26–80	5–3	KFC Yum! Center (6,752); Louisville, KY
12/14/2017*; 6:30 pm		Troy	W 73–57	6–3	Murphy Center (3,986); Murfreesboro, TN
12/17/2017*; 2:00 pm		at Tulane	L 44–62	6–4	Devlin Fieldhouse (545); New Orleans, LA
12/19/2017*; 4:30 pm		vs. USC; UTRGV Holiday Classic	L 57–72	6–5	UTRGV Fieldhouse (89); Edinburg, TX
12/20/2017*; 4:30 pm		vs. Canisius; UTRGV Holiday Classic	W 55–44	7–5	UTRGV Fieldhouse (94); Edinburg, TX
12/20/2017*; 4:30 pm		Kentucky	W 62–57	8–5	Murphy Center (4,209); Murfreesboro, TN
Conference USA regular season
01/04/2018; 7:00 pm, FCSA		at Western Kentucky	L 43–57	8–6 (0–1)	E. A. Diddle Arena (1,811); Bowling Green, KY
01/06/2018; 6:00 pm		UAB	L 51–59	8–7 (0–2)	Murphy Center (3,940); Murfreesboro, TN
01/11/2018; 11:00 am		at UTSA	W 62–47	9–7 (1–2)	Convocation Center (1,202); San Antonio, TX
01/13/2018; 1:00 pm		at UTEP	W 54–45	10–7 (2–2)	Don Haskins Center (617); El Paso, TX
01/18/2018; 6:30 pm, ESPN3		North Texas	W 56–48	11–7 (3–2)	Murphy Center (3,230); Murfreesboro, TN
01/20/2018; 1:00 pm, ESPN3		Southern Miss	L 53–61	11–8 (3–3)	Murphy Center (3,470); Murfreesboro, TN
01/26/2018; 5:00 pm, ESPN3		at Marshall	W 73–57	12–8 (4–3)	Cam Henderson Center (433); Huntington, WV
01/28/2018; 2:00 pm, ESPN3		Charlotte	W 64–45	13–8 (5–3)	Murphy Center (3,441); Murfreesboro, TN
02/01/2018; 2:00 pm, ESPN3		Louisiana Tech	L 49–66	13–9 (5–4)	Murphy Center (3,436); Murfreesboro, TN
02/08/2018; 6:00 pm		at Florida Atlantic	W 69–65	14–9 (6–4)	FAU Arena (692); Boca Raton, FL
02/10/2018; 1:00 pm, beIN		at FIU	W 63–59	15–9 (7–4)	FIU Arena (327); Miami, FL
02/15/2018; 6:30 pm, ESPN3		Western Kentucky	L 60–76	15–10 (7–5)	Murphy Center (4,061); Murfreesboro, TN
02/17/2018; 2:00 pm		Rice	W 51–41	16–10 (8–5)	Murphy Center (4,235); Murfreesboro, TN
02/22/2018; 11:00 am		at UAB	L 43–57	16–11 (8–6)	Bartow Arena (1,011); Birmingham, AL
02/25/2018; 12:00 pm, ESPN3		at Charlotte	W 54–53	17–11 (9–6)	Dale F. Halton Arena (789); Charlotte, NC
03/03/2018; 3:00 pm		Old Dominion	W 65–47	18–11 (10–6)	Murphy Center (10,050); Murfreesboro, TN
Conference USA Women's Tournament
03/08/2018; 11:30 am	(4)	vs. (5) Rice; Quarterfinals	L 36–61	18–12	The Ford Center at The Star; Frisco, TX
WNIT
03/15/2018*; 6:00 pm		at Ball State; First Round	L 60–69	18–13	Worthen Arena (1,083); Muncie, IN
*Non-conference game. ^{#}Rankings from AP Poll. (#) Tournament seedings in parentheses. All times are in Central Time.

== Rankings ==
2017–18 NCAA Division I women's basketball rankings

Regular season polls
Poll	Pre- Season	Week 2	Week 3	Week 4	Week 5	Week 6	Week 7	Week 8	Week 9	Week 10	Week 11	Week 12	Week 13	Week 14	Week 15	Week 16	Week 17	Week 18	Week 19	Final
AP																				N/A
Coaches																				

Legend
	Increase in ranking
	Decrease in ranking
	No change
(RV)	Received votes
(NR)	Not ranked

== See also ==
- 2017–18 Middle Tennessee Blue Raiders men's basketball team
