= 2017–18 Florida Atlantic Owls women's basketball team =

Intercollegiate basketball season

2017–18 Florida Atlantic Owls women's basketball

FAU Holiday Classic champions
- Conference: Conference USA
- Record: 13–15 (7–9 C-USA)
- Head coach: Jim Jabir (1st season)
- Assistant coaches: Kachine Alexander; Terry Primm; Desma Thomas Bateast
- Home arena: FAU Arena

2017–18 Conference USA women's basketball standings
	Conf.				Overall
Team	W		L	PCT	W		L	PCT
UAB	13	–	3	.813	27	–	7	.794
Western Kentucky †	12	–	4	.750	24	–	9	.727
Rice	10	–	6	.625	23	–	10	.697
Louisiana Tech	10	–	6	.625	19	–	12	.613
Middle Tennessee	10	–	6	.625	18	–	13	.581
Charlotte	10	–	6	.625	14	–	16	.467
UTEP	7	–	9	.438	17	–	14	.548
Florida Atlantic	7	–	9	.438	13	–	15	.464
Southern Miss	7	–	9	.438	15	–	15	.500
North Texas	6	–	10	.375	17	–	14	.548
UTSA	6	–	10	.375	9	–	21	.300
Old Dominion	6	–	10	.375	8	–	23	.258
FIU	5	–	11	.313	8	–	21	.276
Marshall	3	–	13	.188	9	–	20	.310
† 2018 C-USA tournament winner As of 20 March 2018; Rankings from AP poll

The 2017–18 Florida Atlantic Owls women's basketball team represented Florida Atlantic University during the 2017–18 NCAA Division I women's basketball season. The Owls, led by first-year head coach Jim Jabir, played their home games at FAU Arena in Boca Raton, Florida and were members of Conference USA (C-USA). They finished the season 13–15, 7–9 in C-USA play, to finish in a three-way tie for seventh place. They lost in the first round of the C-USA women's tournament to UTSA.

== Roster ==
2017–18 Florida Atlantic Owls women's basketball team
Players
Coaches

Pos.	#	Name	Height	Year	Previous school	Hometown
G	0	Danneal Ford	5 ft 9 in (1.75 m)	RS Jr	Norland	Miami, FL
G	4	Tyana Robinson	5 ft 11 in (1.8 m)	RS Fr	Pike HS	Indianapolis, IN
F	5	Raven Doyle	6 ft 2 in (1.88 m)	RS Sr	Desert Christian HS	Lancaster, CA
G	10	Jamaria Williams	5 ft 5 in (1.65 m)	Jr	North Lawndale College Prep HS; Miami Dade College	Chicago, IL
G/F	11	Rhianna-Mae Laing	5 ft 10 in (1.78 m)	Jr	Barking Abbey School; Cowley CC	Bradford, England
G	13	DaChé Williams	6 ft 2 in (1.88 m)	RS Sr	Watkinson School; Rutgers	Bloomfield, CT
F	15	Sasha Cedeño	6 ft 3 in (1.91 m)	Sr	Klein Oak HS	Spring, TX
G	21	Myka Johnson Matthews (redshirt)	5 ft 8 in (1.73 m)	Jr	Bishop McNamara HS; Stetson	Upper Marlboro, MD
G	23	Alexis Cowan	5 ft 7 in (1.7 m)	Jr	Auburn HS; State Fair CC	Bolingbrook, IL
F	31	Ra'Kyra Gabriel	6 ft 2 in (1.88 m)	Jr	Brookside Christian HS	Stockton, CA
G	32	Malia Kency	5 ft 6 in (1.68 m)	Sr	Briarwood Academy	Statesboro, GA
G	33	Nika Zyryanova	5 ft 9 in (1.75 m)	Sr	Casper College	Yekaterinburg, Russia
F	50	Melinda Meyers	6 ft 2 in (1.88 m)	Sr	Highland HS	Gilbert, AZ

Head coach

- Jim Jabir (Nazareth)

Assistant coach(es)

- Kachine Alexander (Iowa)
- Terry Primm (Palm Beach Atlantic)
- Desma Thomas Bateast (Miami (FL))

Legend

- (C) Team captain
- (S) Suspended
- (I) Ineligible
- (W) Walk-on
- Injured
- Current redshirt

Roster
Last update: September 6, 2024

== Schedule ==
Date time, TV	Rank^{#}	Opponent^{#}	Result	Record	Site (attendance) city, state
Exhibition
November 4, 2017*; 2:00 p.m.		at Lynn	W 79–67		De Hoernle Center; Boca Raton, FL
Non-conference regular season
November 12, 2017*; 2:00 p.m.		Mercer	L 55–66	0–1	FAU Arena (587); Boca Raton, FL
November 15, 2017*; 9:00 p.m.		at Colorado	L 69–76	0–2	Coors Events Center (1,503); Boulder, CO
November 20, 2017*; 7:00 p.m., ESPN3		at Indiana State	W 66–58	1–2	Hulman Center (1,258); Terre Haute, IN
November 24, 2017*; 12:00 p.m.		St. Francis Brooklyn; FAU Thanksgiving Tournament semifinals	W 80–60	2–2	FAU Arena; Boca Raton, FL
November 25, 2017*; 2:30 p.m.		Bowling Green; FAU Thanksgiving Tournament championship	L 55–66	2–3	FAU Arena (583); Boca Raton, FL
December 1, 2017*; 7:00 p.m.		Grand Canyon	L 73–77 ^{2OT}	2–4	FAU Arena (374); Boca Raton, FL
December 3, 2017*; 2:00 p.m.		North Florida	W 83–75 ^{2OT}	3–4	FAU Arena (406); Boca Raton, FL
December 15, 2017*; 7:00 p.m., ESPN3		at Georgia State	W 82–50	4–4	GSU Sports Arena (125); Atlanta, GA
December 19, 2017*; 8:00 p.m.		at Nebraska	L 69–86	4–5	Pinnacle Bank Arena (3,635); Lincoln, NE
December 29, 2017*; 12:00 p.m.		Delaware State; FAU Holiday Classic semifinals	W 90–67	5–5	FAU Arena; Boca Raton, FL
December 30, 2017*; 2:30 p.m.		UMKC; FAU Holiday Classic championship	W 65–55	6–5	FAU Arena (641); Boca Raton, FL
Conference USA regular season
January 5, 2018; 7:00 p.m.		Marshall	W 79–59	7–5 (1–0)	FAU Arena (755); Boca Raton, FL
January 7, 2018; 2:00 p.m.		UTEP	W 72–65	8–5 (2–0)	FAU Arena (655); Boca Raton, FL
January 11, 2018; 7:00 p.m.		Rice	L 53–67	8–6 (2–1)	FAU Arena (879); Boca Raton, FL
January 18, 2018; 9:00 p.m.		at UTEP	L 70–75	8–7 (2–2)	Don Haskins Center (511); El Paso, TX
January 20, 2018; 7:00 p.m.		Louisiana Tech	W 86–72	9–7 (3–2)	FAU Arena (804); Boca Raton, FL
January 25, 2018; 7:00 p.m.		at UTSA	W 99–65	10–7 (4–2)	Convocation Center (495); San Antonio, TX
January 27, 2018; 5:00 p.m., ESPN3		at UAB	L 57–90	10–8 (4–3)	Bartow Arena (647); Birmingham, AL
February 3, 2018; 3:00 p.m.		at Western Kentucky	L 63–82	10–9 (4–4)	E. A. Diddle Arena (2,145); Bowling Green, KY
February 8, 2018; 7:00 p.m.		Middle Tennessee	L 65–69	10–10 (4–5)	FAU Arena (692); Boca Raton, FL
February 10, 2018; 7:00 p.m.		North Texas	L 51–65	10–11 (4–6)	FAU Arena (786); Boca Raton, FL
February 14, 2018; 7:00 p.m., ESPN3		at Old Dominion	L 54–59	10–12 (4–7)	Ted Constant Convocation Center (1,588); Norfolk, VA
February 17, 2018; 2:00 p.m.		at FIU	L 65–86	10–13 (4–8)	FIU Arena (433); Miami, FL
February 23, 2018; 7:00 p.m.		Southern Miss	W 89–74	11–13 (5–8)	FAU Arena (480); Boca Raton, FL
February 25, 2018; 2:00 p.m.		FIU	W 67–63	11–14 (6–8)	FAU Arena (569); Boca Raton, FL
March 1, 2018; 6:00 p.m.		at Marshall	W 62–55	12–14 (7–8)	Cam Henderson Center (792); Huntington, WV
March 3, 2018; 5:00 p.m.		at Charlotte	L 69–83	13–14 (7–9)	Dale F. Halton Arena (4,587); Charlotte, NC
Conference USA women's tournament
March 7, 2018; 2:30 p.m.	(10)	vs. (7) UTSA; First round	L 71–83	13–15	The Ford Center at The Star; Frisco, TX
*Non-conference game. ^{#}Rankings from AP poll. (#) Tournament seedings in parentheses. All times are in Eastern.

== See also ==
- 2017–18 Florida Atlantic Owls men's basketball team
