= 2017–18 Western Kentucky Lady Toppers basketball team =

Intercollegiate basketball season

2017–18 Western Kentucky Lady Toppers basketball

C-USA tournament champions

NCAA women's tournament, first round
- Conference: Conference USA
- Record: 24–9 (12–4 C-USA)
- Head coach: Michelle Clark-Heard (5th season)
- Assistant coaches: Greg Collins; Melissa Kolbe; Brittany Parker
- Home arena: E. A. Diddle Arena

2017–18 Conference USA women's basketball standings
	Conf.				Overall
Team	W		L	PCT	W		L	PCT
UAB	13	–	3	.813	27	–	7	.794
Western Kentucky †	12	–	4	.750	24	–	9	.727
Rice	10	–	6	.625	23	–	10	.697
Louisiana Tech	10	–	6	.625	19	–	12	.613
Middle Tennessee	10	–	6	.625	18	–	13	.581
Charlotte	10	–	6	.625	14	–	16	.467
UTEP	7	–	9	.438	17	–	14	.548
Florida Atlantic	7	–	9	.438	13	–	15	.464
Southern Miss	7	–	9	.438	15	–	15	.500
North Texas	6	–	10	.375	17	–	14	.548
UTSA	6	–	10	.375	9	–	21	.300
Old Dominion	6	–	10	.375	8	–	23	.258
FIU	5	–	11	.313	8	–	21	.276
Marshall	3	–	13	.188	9	–	20	.310
† 2018 C-USA tournament winner As of 20 March 2018; Rankings from AP poll

The 2017–18 Western Kentucky Lady Toppers basketball team represented Western Kentucky University during the 2017–18 NCAA Division I women's basketball season. The Lady Toppers were led by fifth-year head coach Michelle Clark-Heard. They played their home games at E. A. Diddle Arena in Bowling Green, Kentucky and were members of Conference USA (C-USA). They finished the season 24–9, 12–4 in C-USA play, to finish in second place. They won the Conference USA tournament for the second year in a row and earned an automatic bid to the NCAA women's basketball tournament where they were defeated by Oregon State in the first round.

On March 27, Michelle Clark-Heard resigned from Western Kentucky to accept the head coaching job at Cincinnati. She finished with a five-year record of 154–48.

== Previous season ==
The Lady Toppers finished the 2016–17 season 27–8, 16–2 in C-USA play, to win the Conference USA regular season and also won the Conference USA tournament. They received an automatic bid to the NCAA women's basketball tournament where they were defeated by Ohio State in the first round.

== Roster ==
2017–18 WKU Lady Toppers women's basketball team
Players
Coaches

Pos.	#	Name	Height	Year	Previous school	Hometown
F	1	Arame Niang	6 ft 3 in (1.91 m)	So		Rufisque, Senegal
G	3	Sidnee Bopp	5 ft 6 in (1.68 m)	Jr	Marmaduke HS	Marmaduke, AR
F	4	Dee Givens	6 ft 1 in (1.85 m)	RS So	Lafayette HS	Lexington, KY
G	5	Whitney Creech	5 ft 8 in (1.73 m)	So	Jenkins HS	Jenkins, KY
F	10	Tashia Brown	6 ft 1 in (1.85 m)	Sr	Lowndes HS	Lake Park, GA
G	11	Alexis Brewer (redshirt)	5 ft 9 in (1.75 m)	Jr	Bardstown HS; West Virginia	Buffalo, KY
G	12	Nichel Tampa	5 ft 5 in (1.65 m)	Fr	St. Francis	Alpharetta, GA
F	15	Raneem Elgedawy	6 ft 4 in (1.93 m)	Fr		Alexandria, Egypt
G	20	Terri Smith	5 ft 7 in (1.7 m)	Fr	Sparkman	Harvest, AL
G	22	Sherry Porter	5 ft 7 in (1.7 m)	Fr	Madison Prep Academy	Baton Rouge, LA
F	23	Ivy Brown	6 ft 1 in (1.85 m)	Sr	LaRue County HS	Hodgenville, KY
F	30	Elizabeth Anderson	6 ft 1 in (1.85 m)	Fr	Mercy Academy	Louisville, KY
G/F	32	Kayla Smith	5 ft 11 in (1.8 m)	Jr	Fayette County HS	Fayetteville, GA

Head coach

- Michelle Clark-Heard (Western Kentucky)

Assistant coach(es)

- Greg Collins (Louisville)
- Melissa Kolbe (Wittenberg)
- Brittany Parker (Fayetteville State)

Legend

- (C) Team captain
- (S) Suspended
- (I) Ineligible
- (W) Walk-on
- Injured
- Current redshirt

Roster
Last update: August 15, 2024

== Schedule ==
Date time, TV	Rank^{#}	Opponent^{#}	Result	Record	Site (attendance) city, state
Exhibition
November 2, 2017*; 7:00 p.m.		Union	W 101–58	1–0	E. A. Diddle Arena (1,468); Bowling Green, KY
Non-conference regular season
November 10, 2017*; 2:30 p.m.		vs. No. 16 Missouri; 2017 Hawkeye Challenge	W 79–76	1–0	Carver–Hawkeye Arena (1,015); Iowa City, IA
November 11, 2017*; 4:30 p.m.		at Iowa; 2017 Hawkeye Challenge	L 97–104 ^{OT}	1–1	Carver–Hawkeye Arena (3,649); Iowa City, IA
November 14, 2017*; 7:00 p.m., FCS/WKYU		No. 6 Notre Dame	L 65–78	1–2	E. A. Diddle Arena (5,061); Bowling Green, KY
November 17, 2017*; 6:00 p.m.		at Indiana	L 71–73	1–3	Simon Skjodt Assembly Hall (3,063); Bloomington, IN
November 24, 2017*; 5:00 p.m.		vs. Mercer; GSU Thanksgiving Classic	W 67–62	2–3	GSU Sports Arena (401); Atlanta, GA
November 26, 2017*; 1:00 p.m., ESPN3		at Georgia State; GSU Thanksgiving Classic	W 74–63	3–3	GSU Sports Arena (412); Atlanta, GA
November 30, 2017*; 7:00 p.m.		Evansville	W 92–54	4–3	E. A. Diddle Arena (1,078); Bowling Green, KY
December 10, 2017*; 2:00 p.m.		at Southern Illinois	W 75–49	5–3	SIU Arena (700); Carbondale, IL
December 12, 2017*; 5:30 p.m.		Mississippi Valley State	W 87–48	6–3	E. A. Diddle Arena (1,063); Bowling Green, KY
December 16, 2017*; 11:00 a.m.		vs. Stetson; West Palm Invitational	W 66–58	7–3	Student Life Center (125); West Palm Beach, FL
December 17, 2017*; 10:00 a.m.		vs. Toledo; West Palm Invitational	W 70–56	8–3	Student Life Center (250); West Palm Beach, FL
December 21, 2017*; 6:00 p.m., ESPN3		at Ball State	L 81–93	8–4	Worthen Arena (1,435); Muncie, IN
December 29, 2017*; 5:30 p.m.		Lee	W 88–64	9–4	E. A. Diddle Arena (1,634); Bowling Green, KY
Conference USA regular season
January 4, 2018; 7:00 p.m., FCS/WKYU		Middle Tennessee	W 57–43	10–4 (1–0)	E. A. Diddle Arena (1,811); Bowling Green, KY
January 6, 2018; 2:00 p.m., FCS/WKYU		Southern Miss	W 81–60	11–4 (2–0)	E. A. Diddle Arena (1,897); Bowling Green, KY
January 11, 2018; 7:00 p.m.		FIU	W 101–47	12–4 (3-0)	E. A. Diddle Arena (1,126); Bowling Green, KY
January 13, 2018; 6:30 p.m., beIN		at UAB	L 61–79	12–5 (3–1)	Bartow Arena (527); Birmingham, AL
January 18, 2018; 11:00 a.m., FCS/WKYU		UTSA	W 73–38	13–5 (4-1)	E. A. Diddle Arena (3,887); Bowling Green, KY
January 21, 2018; 12:00 p.m.		at Marshall	W 86–66	14–5 (5–1)	Cam Henderson Center (573); Huntington, WV
January 26, 2018; 7:00 p.m.		at North Texas	W 79–65	15–5 (6–1)	UNT Coliseum (1,134); Denton, TX
January 28, 2018; 2:00 p.m.		at Louisiana Tech	W 74–64	16–5 (7–1)	Thomas Assembly Center (2,134); Ruston, LA
February 3, 2018; 2:00 p.m.		Florida Atlantic	W 82–63	17–5 (8–1)	E. A. Diddle Arena (2,145); Bowling Green, KY
February 8, 2018; 5:30 p.m., FCS/WKYU		Old Dominion	W 62–48	18–5 (9–1)	E. A. Diddle Arena (3,568); Bowling Green, KY
February 10, 2018; 2:00 p.m.		at Rice	L 58–73	18–6 (9–2)	Tudor Fieldhouse (945); Houston, TX
February 15, 2018; 6:30 p.m., ESPN3		at Middle Tennessee	W 76–60	19–6 (10–2)	Murphy Center (4,061); Murfreesboro, TN
February 17, 2018; 2:00 p.m.		Marshall	W 77–50	20–6 (11–2)	E. A. Diddle Arena (2,205); Bowling Green, KY
February 23, 2018; 7:00 p.m.		Charlotte	W 83–61	21–6 (12–2)	E. A. Diddle Arena (2,459); Bowling Green, KY
March 1, 2018; 6:00 p.m.		at Southern Miss	L 63–69	21–7 (12–3)	Reed Green Coliseum (1,175); Hattiesburg, MS
March 3, 2018; 2:00 p.m.		at UTEP	L 75–80	21–8 (12–4)	Don Haskins Center (528); El Paso, TX
Conference USA women's tournament
March 8, 2018; 1:30 p.m., Stadium	(2)	vs. (10) UTSA; Quarterfinals	W 78–50	22–8	The Ford Center at The Star; Frisco, TX
March 9, 2018; 8:00 p.m., Stadium	(2)	vs. (11) North Texas; Semifinals	W 77–61	23–8	The Ford Center at The Star; Frisco, TX
March 10, 2018; 4:30 p.m., CBSSN	(2)	vs. (1) UAB; Championship game	W 72–57	24–8	The Ford Center at The Star; Frisco, TX
NCAA women's tournament
March 16, 2018*; 11:00 a.m., ESPN2	(11 L)	vs. (6 L) No. 13 Oregon State; First round	L 58–82	24–9	Thompson–Boling Arena; Knoxville, TN
*Non-conference game. ^{#}Rankings from AP poll. (#) Tournament seedings in parentheses. L=Lexington Region. All times are in Central.

== Rankings ==
Regular-season polls
Poll	Pre- season	Week 2	Week 3	Week 4	Week 5	Week 6	Week 7	Week 8	Week 9	Week 10	Week 11	Week 12	Week 13	Week 14	Week 15	Week 16	Week 17	Week 18	Week 19	Final
AP		RV	RV										RV							N/A
Coaches		N/A																		

Legend
	Increase in ranking
	Decrease in ranking
	Not ranked previous week
(RV)	Received votes
(NR)	Not ranked

== See also ==
- 2017–18 Western Kentucky Hilltoppers basketball team
