= Jim Jabir =

American basketball coach (1962–2026)

Biographical details
- Born: August 12, 1962; New York City, New York, U.S.
- Died: April 16, 2026 (aged 63); Menlo Park, California, U.S.
- Education: Nazareth College

Coaching career (HC unless noted)
- 1986–1987: Buffalo State
- 1987–1990: Siena
- 1990–1996: Marquette
- 1996–2002: Providence
- 2002–2003: Colorado (assistant)
- 2003–2016: Dayton
- 2017: SISU BK
- 2017–2021: Florida Atlantic
- 2021–2024: Siena

Head coaching record
- Overall: 561–472 (.543)

James Jude Jabir Jr. (August 12, 1962 – April 16, 2026) was an American basketball coach who coached at the college level and the professional level.

== Career ==
A native of Brooklyn, New York, Jabir graduated from Nazareth College in 1984 with a degree in English. He began his coaching career as an assistant at Nazareth in 1984–85. He was the head coach of Buffalo State College in the NCAA Division 3 in 1986–87, guiding the team to a SUNYAC Championship and the NCAA Regionals. At Buffalo State, he earned a Master's degree in Student Personnel Administration.

At age 24, Jabir was named Head Women's Basketball Coach at Siena College. Between 1987 and 1990, he had a record of 50–29 at Siena, followed by head coaching stints at Marquette University (1990–1996) and Providence College (1996–2002). He guided Marquette Women’s Basketball Team to NCAA Tournament appearances in 1994 and 1995, Jabir earned Reebok/Great Midwest Coach of the Year honors twice. During his tenure at Providence, he led the Women’s team to 62 wins and 102 losses.

In 2002–03, Jabir was an assistant coach at the Colorado University Women’s Basketball Team, helping the squad to a Sweet 16 appearance. Jabir moved to the University of Dayton, where he was the Head Women’s Basketball Coach from 2003 to 2016. At Dayton, he compiled a record of 252 wins and 155 defeats and became the winningest coach in program history. In 2013, his Dayton Flyers’ team was ranked 11th nationally in the Associated Press and USA Today Coaches polls. He coached Dayton to the NCAA Elite Eight in 2015. Jabir received Atlantic 10 Coach of the Year honors in 2008 and 2013 and was a finalist for the Naismith College Coach of the Year Award in 2013. On September 7, 2016, Jabir stepped back for health reasons. Jabir said, he has had heart problems in the past and a pacemaker and defibrillator.

In parts of the 2016–17 season, he coached in the professional ranks, serving as head coach for SISU's men's team in Denmark’s Basketligaen, where he signed in January 2017. He guided the team to a semifinal appearance and was named 2016–17 Basketligaen Coach of the Year. Under his guidance, SISU won eleven of its 18 games.

Jabir went back to the United States and was Head Women's Basketball Coach at Florida Atlantic University from 2017 to 2021. In April 2021, he returned to Siena College and was named Siena's Women's Basketball Head Coach.

== Retirement and death ==
Jabir announced his retirement in March 2024. He decided to move to California where his wife took a job at Stanford University. Jabir died from complications of pancreatic cancer on April 16, 2026, at the age of 63.

== Head coaching record ==
Record table
Season	Team	Overall	Conference	Standing	Postseason
Buffalo State (SUNYAC) (1986–1987)
1986–1987	Buffalo State	14–11	8–2		
Buffalo State:		14–11 (.560)	8–2 (.800)		
Siena Saints (Independent) (1987–1989)
1987–1988	Siena Saints	16–10			
1988–1989	Siena Saints	16–8			
Siena Saints (MAAC) (1989–1990)
1989–1990	Siena Saints	18–11	5–5	6th	
Siena Saints:		50–29 (.633)	5–5 (.500)		
Marquette (Midwestern Collegiate) (1990–1991)
1990–1991	Marquette	7–20	3–13	8th	
Marquette (Great Midwest) (1991–1995)
1991–1992	Marquette	16–13	7–3	3rd	
1992–1993	Marquette	22–9	10–0	1st	NWIT 4th Place
1993–1994	Marquette	22–7	10–2	2nd	NCAA Division I Round of 64
1994–1995	Marquette	19–12	9–3	T–2nd	NCAA Division I Round of 64
Marquette (Conference USA) (1995–1996)
1995–1996	Marquette	8–20	5–9	7th	
Marquette Golden Eagles:		94–81 (.537)	44–30 (.595)		
Providence Friars (Big East) (1996–2002)
1996–1997	Providence	13–14	8–10	T–6th	
1997–1998	Providence	10–17	6–12	T–9th	
1998–1999	Providence	5–22	4–14	11th	
1999–2000	Providence	10–17	5–11	T–9th	
2000–2001	Providence	11–17	4–12	11th	
2001–2002	Providence	13–15	6–10	8th	
Providence Friars:		62–85 (.422)	33–69 (.324)		
Dayton Flyers (A-10) (2003–2016)
2003–2004	Dayton	3–25	1–15	12th	
2004–2005	Dayton	12–16	6–10	T–5th	
2005–2006	Dayton	17–12	8–8	T–6th	
2006–2007	Dayton	12–19	7–8	9th	
2007–2008	Dayton	25–9	9–5	T–4th	
2008–2009	Dayton	21–14	7–7	8th	
2009–2010	Dayton	25–8	11–3	T–2nd	NCAA Division I Round of 32
2010–2011	Dayton	21–12	9–5	T–3rd	NCAA Division I Round of 64
2011–2012	Dayton	23–7	12–2	3rd	NCAA Division I Round of 64
2012–13	Dayton	28–3	14–0	1st	NCAA Division I Round of 32
2013–14	Dayton	23–8	14–2	1st	NCAA Division I Round of 64
2014–15	Dayton	28–7	14–2	2nd	NCAA Division I Elite Eight
2015–16	Dayton	14–15	7–9	8th	WNIT First Round
Dayton Flyers:		252–155 (.619)	119–76 (.610)		
Florida Atlantic Owls (C-USA) (2017–2021)
2017–18	Florida Atlantic	13–15	7–9	T–7th	
2018–19	Florida Atlantic	5–24	2–14	T–12th	
2019–20	Florida Atlantic	13–17	7–11	T–8th	
2020–21	Florida Atlantic	11–11	8–8	T–3rd (East)	
Florida Atlantic Owls:		42–67 (.385)	24–42 (.364)		
Siena Saints (MAAC) (2021–2024)
2021–22	Siena	10–19	10–10	5th	
2022–23	Siena	19–13	12–8	4th	
2023–24	Siena	18–12	14–6	3rd	
Siena Saints:		47–44 (.516)	36–24 (.600)		
Total:		561–472 (.543)			
National champion Postseason invitational champion Conference regular season champion Conference regular season and conference tournament champion Division regular season champion Division regular season and conference tournament champion Conference tournament champion
