= 2017–18 North Texas Mean Green women's basketball team =

Intercollegiate basketball season

2017–18 North Texas Mean Green women's basketball
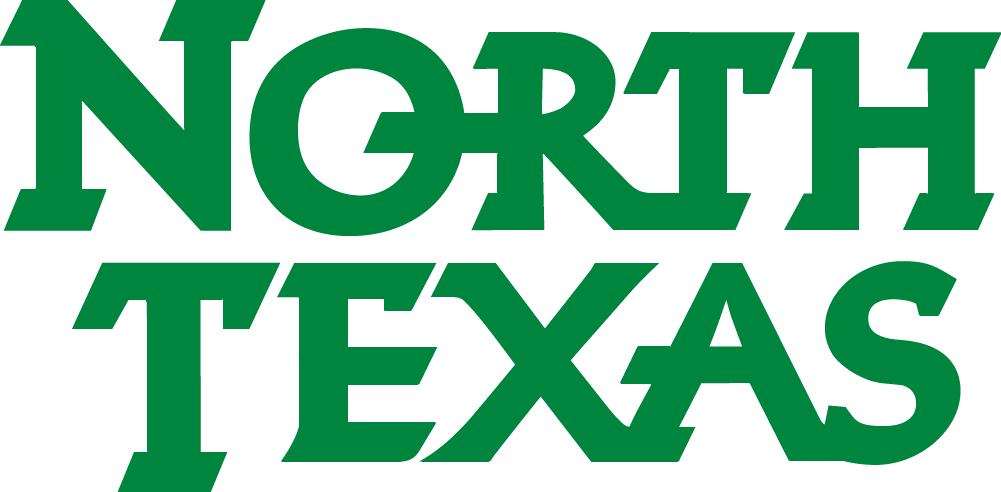
- Conference: Conference USA
- Record: 17–14 (6–10 C-USA)
- Head coach: Jalie Mitchell (3rd season)
- Assistant coaches: Bobby Brasel; Carlos Knox; Kasondra Foreman
- Home arena: The Super Pit

2017–18 Conference USA women's basketball standings
	Conf.				Overall
Team	W		L	PCT	W		L	PCT
UAB	13	–	3	.813	27	–	7	.794
Western Kentucky †	12	–	4	.750	24	–	9	.727
Rice	10	–	6	.625	23	–	10	.697
Louisiana Tech	10	–	6	.625	19	–	12	.613
Middle Tennessee	10	–	6	.625	18	–	13	.581
Charlotte	10	–	6	.625	14	–	16	.467
UTEP	7	–	9	.438	17	–	14	.548
Florida Atlantic	7	–	9	.438	13	–	15	.464
Southern Miss	7	–	9	.438	15	–	15	.500
North Texas	6	–	10	.375	17	–	14	.548
UTSA	6	–	10	.375	9	–	21	.300
Old Dominion	6	–	10	.375	8	–	23	.258
FIU	5	–	11	.313	8	–	21	.276
Marshall	3	–	13	.188	9	–	20	.310
† 2018 C-USA tournament winner As of 20 March 2018; Rankings from AP poll

The 2017–18 North Texas Mean Green women's basketball team represented the University of North Texas during the 2017–18 NCAA Division I women's basketball season. The Mean Green, led by third year head coach Jalie Mitchell, played their home games UNT Coliseum, also known as The Super Pit, and were members of Conference USA. They finished the season 17–14, 6–10 in C-USA play to finish in a 3-way tie for tenth place. They advanced to the semifinals of the C-USA women's tournament, where they lost to Western Kentucky.

== Previous season ==
They finished the season 12–19, 8–10 in C-USA play to finish in a 3-way tie for eighth place. They advanced to the quarterfinals of the C-USA women's tournament where they lost to WKU.

== Roster ==
2017–18 North Texas Mean Green women's basketball team
Players
Coaches

Pos.	#	Name	Height	Year	Previous school	Hometown
G	0	Callie Owens (redshirt)	5 ft 10 in (1.78 m)	So	Plano West HS; Pacific	Plano, TX
G	1	Tyara Warren	5 ft 9 in (1.75 m)	RS Jr	Plano West HS; West Virginia	Plano, TX
G	2	Grance Goodhart	5 ft 9 in (1.75 m)	Jr	Sunnyvale HS; Loyola–Chicago	Sunnyvale, TX
G	3	Brittany Smith	5 ft 6 in (1.68 m)	Jr	Spring HS; South Plains College	Houston, TX
G	10	Adrianna Henderson	5 ft 8 in (1.73 m)	So	Topeka HS	Topeka, KS
F	11	Justis Szcezepanski	6 ft 3 in (1.91 m)	RS So	IMG Academy; Baylor	Portland, OR
F	12	Jada Poland	5 ft 11 in (1.8 m)	So	Fort Zumwalt HS	St. Louis, MO
G	13	Orianna Shillow	5 ft 8 in (1.73 m)	Jr	Stony Point HS	Round Rock, TX
C	15	Hannah Hopkins	5 ft 3 in (1.6 m)	So	Kingwood HS	Humble, TX
F	21	Deja Terrell	6 ft 1 in (1.85 m)	Fr	Life Oak Cliff HS	Dallas, TX
G	23	Terriell Bradley	5 ft 10 in (1.78 m)	RS Jr	Mansfield HS; Kansas	Arlington, TX
G	24	Trena Mims	5 ft 5 in (1.65 m)	Fr	Muskogee HS	Muskogee, OK
C	30	Tosin Mabodu	6 ft 1 in (1.85 m)	Sr	Homewood-Flossmor HS; Murray State College	Chicago, IL
G	33	Lauren Holmes	5 ft 9 in (1.75 m)	Fr	Fayetteville HS	Fayetteville, AR
C	34	Micayla Buckner	6 ft 3 in (1.91 m)	RS Jr	Naaman Forest HS; Collin College	Garland, TX
F	41	Madison Townley	6 ft 0 in (1.83 m)	So	Duncanville HS	Duncanville, TX

Head coach

- Jalie Mitchell (North Texas)

Assistant coach(es)

- Bobby Brasel (UT Permian Basin)
- Carlos Knox (IUPUI)
- Kasondra Foreman (North Texas)

Legend

- (C) Team captain
- (S) Suspended
- (I) Ineligible
- (W) Walk-on
- Injured
- Current redshirt

Roster
Last update: December 27, 2017

== Schedule ==
Date time, TV	Rank^{#}	Opponent^{#}	Result	Record	Site (attendance) city, state
Exhibition
11/04/2017*; 3:00 pm		Texas Woman's	W 69–66		The Super Pit (350); Denton, TX
Non-conference regular Season
11/10/2017*; 3:00 pm		Mid-America Christian	W 86–52	1–0	The Super Pit (1,007); Denton, TX
11/14/2017*; 7:00 pm		Texas A&M International	W 64–38	2–0	The Super Pit (807); Denton, TX
11/19/2017*; 3:00 pm		Kansas State	L 54–55	2–1	The Super Pit (1,172); Denton, TX
11/23/2017*; 1:00 pm		vs. Coastal Carolina; San Juan Shootout	W 50–34	3–1	Ocean Center; Daytona Beach, FL
11/24/2017*; 3:15 pm		vs. Detroit; San Juan Shootout	W 63–57	4–1	Ocean Center (175); Daytona Beach, FL
11/29/2017*; 11:30 am		SMU	W 47–40	5–1	The Super Pit (3,243); Denton, TX
12/02/2017*; 3:00 pm		Tulsa	W 66–43	6–1	The Super Pit (1,181); Denton, TX
12/05/2017*; 6:00 pm		at Indiana	L 63–68	6–2	Simon Skjodt Assembly Hall (2,303); Bloomington, IN
12/09/2017*; 3:00 pm		La Salle	W 70–44	7–2	The Super Pit (996); Denton, TX
12/18/2017*; 7:00 pm, ESPN3		at UIC	L 67–70	7–3	UIC Pavilion (249); Chicago, IL
12/20/2017*; 6:00 pm		at Eastern Illinois	W 63–61 ^{OT}	8–3	Lantz Arena (287); Charleston, IL
12/30/2017*; 3:00 pm		Oklahoma Panhandle State	W 63–41	9–3	The Super Pit (397); Denton, TX
Conference USA regular Season
01/03/2018; 6:30 pm		at Louisiana Tech	L 53–61	9–4 (0–1)	Thomas Assembly Center (1,749); Ruston, LA
01/05/2018; 7:00 pm, beIN		Rice	L 49–50	9–5 (0–2)	The Super Pit (1,211); Denton, TX
01/11/2018; 7:00 pm		Old Dominion	W 63–46	10–5 (1–2)	The Super Pit (1,028); Denton, TX
01/13/2018; 3:00 pm		Charlotte	W 73–68	11–5 (2–2)	The Super Pit (643); Denton, TX
01/18/2018; 6:30 pm, ESPN3		at Middle Tennessee	L 48–56	11–6 (2–3)	Murphy Center (3,270); Murfreesboro, TN
01/20/2018; 2:00 pm		at UAB	L 52–68	11–7 (2–4)	Bartow Arena (369); Birmingham, AL
01/26/2018; 7:00 pm		Western Kentucky	L 65–79	11–8 (2–5)	The Super Pit (1,134); Denton, TX
01/28/2018; 2:00 pm		UTEP	L 48–50	11–9 (2–6)	The Super Pit (1,302); Denton, TX
02/02/2018; 2:00 pm		at UTSA	L 58–70	11–10 (2–7)	Convocation Center (605); San Antonio, TX
02/08/2018; 6:00 pm		at FIU	W 92–46	12–10 (3–7)	FIU Arena (298); Miami, FL
02/10/2018; 6:00 pm		at Florida Atlantic	W 65–51	13–10 (4–7)	FAU Arena (786); Boca Raton, FL
02/15/2018; 5:00 pm		Southern Miss	W 65–51	14–10 (5–7)	The Super Pit (1,602); Denton, TX
02/22/2018; 6:00 pm, beIN		at Old Dominion	W 55–52	15–10 (6–7)	Ted Constant Convocation Center (1,762); Norfolk, VA
02/24/2018; 7:00 pm, ESPN3		Marshall	L 54–62	15–11 (6–8)	The Super Pit (1,136); Denton, TX
03/01/2018; 5:00 pm		UAB	L 51–69	15–12 (6–9)	The Super Pit (1,310); Denton, TX
03/03/2018; 4:30 pm, ESPN3		at Rice	L 45–47	15–13 (6–10)	Tudor Fieldhouse (3,524); Houston, TX
Conference USA Women's Tournament
03/07/2018; 2:30 pm	(11)	vs. (6) Charlotte; First Round	L 55–58	16–13	The Ford Center at The Star (2,031); Frisco, TX
03/08/2018; 2:30 pm	(11)	vs. (3) Louisiana Tech; Quarterfinals	W 76–69	17–13	The Ford Center at The Star; Frisco, TX
03/09/2018; 8:00 pm, Stadium	(11)	vs. (2) Western Kentucky; Semifinals	L 61–77	17–14	The Ford Center at The Star; Frisco, TX
*Non-conference game. ^{#}Rankings from AP Poll. (#) Tournament seedings in parentheses. All times are in Central Time.

== See also ==
2017–18 North Texas Mean Green men's basketball team
