= 2017–18 UTEP Miners women's basketball team =

Intercollegiate basketball season

2017–18 UTEP Miners women's basketball
- Conference: Conference USA
- Record: 17–14 (7–9 C-USA)
- Head coach: Kevin Baker (1st season)
- Assistant coaches: Nicole Dunson; Michael Madrid; Lori Morris
- Home arena: Don Haskins Center

2017–18 Conference USA women's basketball standings
	Conf.				Overall
Team	W		L	PCT	W		L	PCT
UAB	13	–	3	.813	27	–	7	.794
Western Kentucky †	12	–	4	.750	24	–	9	.727
Rice	10	–	6	.625	23	–	10	.697
Louisiana Tech	10	–	6	.625	19	–	12	.613
Middle Tennessee	10	–	6	.625	18	–	13	.581
Charlotte	10	–	6	.625	14	–	16	.467
UTEP	7	–	9	.438	17	–	14	.548
Florida Atlantic	7	–	9	.438	13	–	15	.464
Southern Miss	7	–	9	.438	15	–	15	.500
North Texas	6	–	10	.375	17	–	14	.548
UTSA	6	–	10	.375	9	–	21	.300
Old Dominion	6	–	10	.375	8	–	23	.258
FIU	5	–	11	.313	8	–	21	.276
Marshall	3	–	13	.188	9	–	20	.310
† 2018 C-USA tournament winner As of 20 March 2018; Rankings from AP poll

The 2017–18 UTEP Miners women's basketball team represented the University of Texas at El Paso during the 2017–18 NCAA Division I women's basketball season. The Miners, led by first year head coach Kevin Baker, played their home games at Don Haskins Center and were members of Conference USA. They finished the season 17–14, 7–9 in C-USA play to finish in a 3 way tie for seventh place. They advanced to the quarterfinals of the C-USA women's tournament, where they lost to UAB.

== Previous season ==
They finished the season 8–23, 5–13 in C-USA play to finish in a tie for eleventh place. They lost in the first round of the C-USA women's tournament to Old Dominion.

== Roster ==
2017–18 UTEP Miners women's basketball team
Players
Coaches

Pos.	#	Name	Height	Year	Previous school	Hometown
G	0	Jordan Jenkins	5 ft 3 in (1.6 m)	Fr	Buffalo HS	Buffalo, TX
G	1	Roeshonda Patterson	5 ft 8 in (1.73 m)	So	New Way Christian Academy	Odessa, TX
G/F	3	Jordan Alexander	5 ft 11 in (1.8 m)	Jr	Skyline HS; Trinity Valley CC	Dallas, TX
G	4	Neidy Ocuane	5 ft 5 in (1.65 m)	Jr	Seward County CC	Maputo, Mozambique
F	5	Zuzanna Puc	6 ft 2 in (1.88 m)	So	ZSMS Poznan	Poznań, Poland
G	10	Faith Cook	5 ft 3 in (1.6 m)	So	Goose Creek Memorial HS	Baytown, TX
F	12	Ariona Gill	5 ft 11 in (1.8 m)	Jr	Arbor View; San Jacinto College	Las Vegas, NV
G/F	14	Najala Howell	5 ft 10 in (1.78 m)	Jr	DeSoto HS	DeSoto, TX
F	23	Jakeira Ford	6 ft 1 in (1.85 m)	So	Port Arthur Memorial HS	Port Arthur, TX
G	24	Rachel Tapps	5 ft 8 in (1.73 m)	So	Cypress Ranch HS	Cypress, TX
F	42	Tamara Seda	6 ft 4 in (1.93 m)	RS Sr	Seward County CC	Maputo, Mozambique
G	44	Katarina Zec	5 ft 10 in (1.78 m)	So	Sportska gimnazija	Belgrade, Serbia

Head coach

- Kevin Baker (Stephen F. Austin)

Assistant coach(es)

- Nicole Dunson (Texas–San Antonio)
- Michael Madrid (Eastern New Mexico)
- Lori Morris (San Diego)

Legend

- (C) Team captain
- (S) Suspended
- (I) Ineligible
- (W) Walk-on
- Injured
- Current redshirt

Roster
Last update: December 27, 2017

== Schedule ==
Date time, TV	Rank^{#}	Opponent^{#}	Result	Record	Site (attendance) city, state
Exhibition
10/29/2017*; 1:00 pm		Sul Ross State	W 99–40		Don Haskins Center (473); El Paso, TX
11/04/2017*; 1:00 pm		St. Mary's (TX)	L 62–68		Don Haskins Center (453); El Paso, TX
Non-conference regular season
11/11/2017*; 1:00 pm		Cal State Bakersfield	W 67–56	1–0	Don Haskins Center (426); El Paso, TX
11/18/2017*; 7:00 pm		Texas A&M–Corpus Christi	W 69–49	2–0	Don Haskins Center (426); El Paso, TX
11/24/2017*; 2:30 pm		Arkansas; UTEP Classic	W 64–61	3–0	Don Haskins Center (633); El Paso, TX
11/25/2017*; 2:30 pm		Texas Southern; UTEP Classic	W 65–55	4–0	Don Haskins Center (709); El Paso, TX
11/30/2017*; 5:30 pm		New Mexico	L 35–59	4–1	Don Haskins Center (1,350); El Paso, TX
12/02/2017*; 1:00 pm		Houston Baptist	W 69–62	5–1	Don Haskins Center (412); El Paso, TX
12/05/2017*; 4:00 pm		at Arkansas State	L 73–76	5–2	First National Bank Arena; Jonesboro, AR
12/05/2017*; 4:00 pm, FSSW/FSAZ+		at New Mexico State; Battle of I-10	L 68–76	5–3	Pan American Center (886); Las Cruces, NM
12/17/2017*; 11:30 am		vs. East Carolina; Carolinas Challenge	W 94–79 ^{OT}	6–3	Myrtle Beach Convention Center (100); Myrtle Beach, SC
12/21/2017*; 4:00 pm		vs. Samford; Tulane Classic semifinals	W 46–33	7–3	Devlin Fieldhouse (672); New Orleans, LA
12/22/2017*; 2:00 pm		at Tulane; Tulane Classic championship	L 56–67	7–4	Devlin Fieldhouse (706); New Orleans, LA
12/29/2017*; 8:00 pm		at Cal State Fullerton	W 92–91 ^{2OT}	8–4	Titan Gym (672); Fullerton, CA
12/30/2017*; 6:00 pm		at UC Riverside	W 73–62	9–4	SRC Arena (311); Riverside, CA
Conference USA regular season
01/05/2018; 5:00 pm		at FIU	W 77–76	10–4 (1–0)	FIU Arena (289); Miami, FL
01/07/2018; 12:00 pm		at Florida Atlantic	L 66–72	10–5 (1–1)	FAU Arena (655); Boca Raton, FL
01/11/2018; 1:00 pm, beIN		Charlotte	W 67–58	11–5 (2–1)	Don Haskins Center (1,375); El Paso, TX
01/13/2018; 12:00 pm		Middle Tennessee	L 45–54	11–6 (2–2)	Don Haskins Center (617); El Paso, TX
01/18/2018; 7:00 pm		Florida Atlantic	W 75–70	12–6 (3–2)	Don Haskins Center (511); El Paso, TX
01/26/2018; 6:00 pm		at Rice	L 42–56	12–7 (3–3)	Tudor Fieldhouse (681); Houston, TX
01/28/2018; 2:00 pm		at North Texas	W 50–48	13–7 (4–3)	The Super Pit (1,302); Denton, TX
02/02/2018; 7:00 pm, beIN		UAB	L 64–84	13–8 (4–4)	Don Haskins Center (771); El Paso, TX
02/04/2018; 1:00 pm		at UTSA	W 66–53	14–8 (5–4)	Convocation Center (468); San Antonio, TX
02/10/2018; 1:00 pm		Louisiana Tech	L 62–65	14–9 (5–5)	Don Haskins Center (1,104); El Paso, TX
02/15/2018; 4:00 pm		at Marshall	L 64–66	14–10 (5–6)	Cam Henderson Center (698); Huntington, WV
02/17/2018; 12:00 pm		at Old Dominion	L 52–56 ^{OT}	14–11 (5–7)	Ted Constant Convocation Center (2,890); Norfolk, WV
02/23/2018; 7:00 pm		UTSA	L 55–58	14–12 (5–8)	Don Haskins Center (748); El Paso, TX
02/25/2018; 1:00 pm		at Southern Miss	L 53–60	14–13 (5–9)	Reed Green Coliseum (1,310); Hattiesburg, MS
03/01/2018; 7:00 pm		FIU	W 86–70	15–13 (6–9)	Don Haskins Center (655); El Paso, TX
03/03/2018; 1:00 pm		Western Kentucky	W 80–75	16–13 (7–9)	Don Haskins Center (528); El Paso, TX
C-USA Women's Tournament
03/07/2018; 10:00 am	(9)	vs. (8) Southern Miss; First Round	W 72–67	17–13	The Ford Center at The Star; Frisco, TX
03/08/2018; 10:00 am	(9)	vs. (1) UAB; Quarterfinals	L 66–75	17–14	The Ford Center at The Star; Frisco, TX
*Non-conference game. ^{#}Rankings from AP Poll. (#) Tournament seedings in parentheses. All times are in Mountain Time.

== Rankings ==
2017–18 NCAA Division I women's basketball rankings

+ Regular season polls	Poll	Pre- Season	Week 2	Week 3	Week 4	Week 5	Week 6	Week 7	Week 8	Week 9	Week 10	Week 11	Week 12	Week 13	Week 14	Week 15	Week 16	Week 17	Week 18	Week 19	Final
AP																				N/A	
Coaches																					

Legend
	Increase in ranking
	Decrease in ranking
	No change
(RV)	Received votes
(NR)	Not ranked

== See also ==
2017–18 UTEP Miners men's basketball team
