= 2017–18 Charlotte 49ers women's basketball team =

Intercollegiate basketball season

2017–18 Charlotte 49ers women's basketball
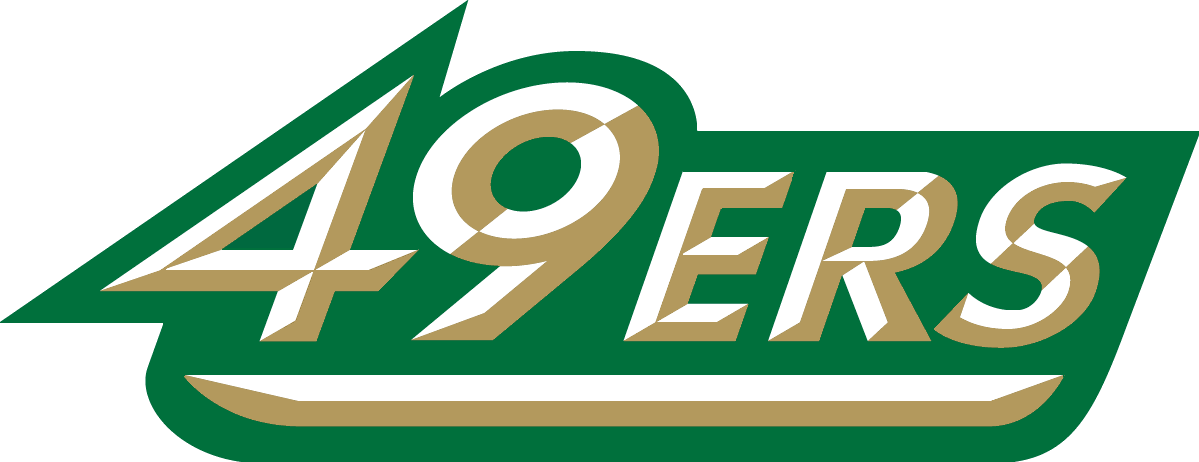
- Conference: Conference USA
- Record: 14–16 (10–6 C-USA)
- Head coach: Cara Consuegra (6th season)
- Assistant coaches: Nicole Woods; Joanne Aluka-White; Tanisha Wright
- Home arena: Dale F. Halton Arena

2017–18 Conference USA women's basketball standings
	Conf.				Overall
Team	W		L	PCT	W		L	PCT
UAB	13	–	3	.813	27	–	7	.794
Western Kentucky †	12	–	4	.750	24	–	9	.727
Rice	10	–	6	.625	23	–	10	.697
Louisiana Tech	10	–	6	.625	19	–	12	.613
Middle Tennessee	10	–	6	.625	18	–	13	.581
Charlotte	10	–	6	.625	14	–	16	.467
UTEP	7	–	9	.438	17	–	14	.548
Florida Atlantic	7	–	9	.438	13	–	15	.464
Southern Miss	7	–	9	.438	15	–	15	.500
North Texas	6	–	10	.375	17	–	14	.548
UTSA	6	–	10	.375	9	–	21	.300
Old Dominion	6	–	10	.375	8	–	23	.258
FIU	5	–	11	.313	8	–	21	.276
Marshall	3	–	13	.188	9	–	20	.310
† 2018 C-USA tournament winner As of 20 March 2018; Rankings from AP poll

The 2017–18 Charlotte 49ers women's basketball team represented the University of North Carolina at Charlotte during the 2017–18 NCAA Division I women's basketball season. The 49ers, led by sixth-year head coach Cara Consuegra, played their home games at Dale F. Halton Arena in Charlotte, North Carolina as members of Conference USA (C-USA). They finished the season 14–16, 10–6 in C-USA play, to finish in a four-way tie for third place. They lost in the first round of the C-USA women's tournament to North Texas.

== Previous season ==
The 49ers finished the 2016–17 season 21–10, 12–6 in C-USA play, to finish in a tie for fourth place. They advance to the quarterfinals of the C-USA women's tournament where they lost to Louisiana Tech. Despite having 21 wins, they were not invited to a postseason tournament.

== Roster ==
2017–18 Charlotte 49ers women's basketball team
Players
Coaches

Pos.	#	Name	Height	Year	Previous school	Hometown
G	2	Christian Hithe (redshirt)	5 ft 9 in (1.75 m)	So	Spring Valley; UCF	Columbia, SC
G	3	Mariah Linney	5 ft 9 in (1.75 m)	Fr	Goose Creek	Goose Creek, SC
G	4	Laia Raventós	5 ft 7 in (1.7 m)	RS Jr	IES Joaquim Blume	Santa Eulàlia de Riuprimer, Spain
G	5	Jade Phillips (redshirt)	5 ft 11 in (1.8 m)	Jr	Southeast Raleigh; Syracuse	Raleigh, NC
G	10	Jada Martin	5 ft 8 in (1.73 m)	Sr	Fairfield Central; Spartanburg Methodist	Winnsboro, SC
G	13	Octavia Wilson	5 ft 8 in (1.73 m)	Fr	Eleanor Roosevelt	Greenbelt, MD
F	15	Nyilah Jamison-Myers	6 ft 3 in (1.91 m)	RS Sr	Orangeburg-Wilkinson; Clemson	Orangeburg, SC
G	22	Lauren Harley	5 ft 8 in (1.73 m)	So	Blythewood	Columbia, SC
F	24	Lyrissa Deans	6 ft 3 in (1.91 m)	Fr	Bishop Ireton	Waldorf, MD
F	30	Jaida Robinson	6 ft 2 in (1.88 m)	RS So	Albemarle	Albemarle, NC
F	34	Dara Pearson	6 ft 3 in (1.91 m)	RS So	Hampton	Hampton, VA
G	44	Amaya Ransom	5 ft 11 in (1.8 m)	Sr	Landstown	Virginia Beach, VA
F	45	Ka'Neeshia Brown	6 ft 3 in (1.91 m)	Jr	South Miami; Daytona State	Miami, FL

Head coach

- Cara Consuegra (Iowa)

Assistant coach(es)

- Nicole Woods (Belmont Abbey)
- Joanne Aluka-White (Middle Tennessee)
- Tanisha Wright (Penn State)

Legend

- (C) Team captain
- (S) Suspended
- (I) Ineligible
- (W) Walk-on
- Injured
- Current redshirt

Roster
Last update: February 17, 2025

== Schedule ==
Date time, TV	Rank^{#}	Opponent^{#}	Result	Record	Site (attendance) city, state
Exhibition
November 4, 2017*; 7:00 p.m.		Coker	W 78–47		Dale F. Halton Arena; Charlotte, NC
Non-conference regular season
November 10, 2017*; 5:00 p.m.		Duquesne	W 75–72	1–0	Dale F. Halton Arena (4,841); Charlotte, NC
November 12, 2017*; 12:00 p.m.		at Wisconsin	L 66–80	1–1	Kohl Center (3,235); Madison, WI
November 16, 2017*; 7:00 p.m.		Rutgers	L 54–77	1–2	Dale F. Halton Arena (872); Charlotte, NC
November 18, 2017*; 2:00 p.m.		at UNC Asheville	W 51–47	2–2	Kimmel Arena (756); Asheville, NC
November 23, 2017*; 12:00 p.m.		vs. Iowa; Puerto Rico Clasico	L 64–77	2–3	Cardinal Gibbons High School (172); Fort Lauderdale, FL
November 25, 2017*; 2:30 p.m.		vs. South Dakota State; Puerto Rico Clasico	L 70–71	2–4	Cardinal Gibbons High School (172); Fort Lauderdale, FL
November 30, 2017*; 5:30 p.m.		at East Carolina	L 55–58	2–5	Williams Arena (824); Greenville, NC
December 3, 2017*; 1:00 p.m.		Coppin State	W 78–49	3–5	Dale F. Halton Arena (975); Charlotte, NC
December 7, 2017*; 8:00 p.m.		at Arkansas	L 72–73	3–6	Bud Walton Arena (1,139); Fayetteville, AR
December 18, 2017*; 11:00 a.m.		at Wake Forest	L 69–71	3–7	LJVM Coliseum (10,011); Winston-Salem, NC
December 21, 2017*; 2:00 p.m.		at Davidson	L 66–68	3–8	John M. Belk Arena (379); Davidson, NC
December 28, 2017*; 7:00 p.m.		South Carolina State	W 64–49	4–8	Dale F. Halton Arena (814); Charlotte, NC
December 30, 2017*; 4:00 p.m.		Mercer	L 74–90	4–9	Dale F. Halton Arena (863); Charlotte, NC
Conference USA regular season
January 4, 2018; 11:30 a.m.		Southern Miss	W 66–56	5–10 (1–0)	Dale F. Halton Arena (5,438); Charlotte, NC
January 6, 2018; 7:00 p.m.		at Old Dominion	W 63–60	6–10 (2–0)	Ted Constant Convocation Center (1,522); Norfolk, VA
January 11, 2018; 3:00 p.m., beIN		at UTEP	L 58–67	6–11 (2–1)	Don Haskins Center (1,375); El Paso, TX
January 13, 2018; 4:00 p.m.		at North Texas	L 68–73	6–12 (2–2)	The Super Pit (643); Denton, TX
January 20, 2018; 7:00 p.m.		Rice	L 55–62	6–13 (2–3)	Dale F. Halton Arena (802); Charlotte, NC
January 25, 2018; 7:00 p.m.		at Southern Miss	W 85–79 ^{2OT}	7–13 (3–3)	Reed Green Coliseum (1,346); Hattiesburg, MS
January 28, 2018; 3:00 p.m., ESPN3		at Middle Tennessee	L 45–64	7–13 (3–4)	Murphy Center (3,441); Murfreesboro, TN
February 2, 2018; 7:00 p.m.		Marshall	W 67–61	8–13 (4–4)	Dale F. Halton Arena (865); Charlotte, NC
February 4, 2018; 1:00 p.m., ESPN3		FIU	W 80–57	9–13 (5–4)	Dale F. Halton Arena (778); Charlotte, NC
February 10, 2018; 7:00 p.m., ESPN3		UTSA	W 88–75	10–13 (6–4)	Dale F. Halton Arena (1,048); Charlotte, NC
February 15, 2018; 5:30 p.m.		at Louisiana Tech	W 64–51	11–13 (7–4)	Thomas Assembly Center (3,562); Ruston, LA
February 17, 2018; 3:00 p.m.		at UAB	W 64–51	12–13 (8–4)	Bartow Arena (427); Birmingham, AL
February 23, 2018; 8:00 p.m.		at Western Kentucky	L 61–83	12–14 (8–5)	E. A. Diddle Arena (2,459); Bowling Green, KY
February 25, 2018; 1:00 p.m., ESPN3		Middle Tennessee	L 53–54	12–15 (8–6)	Dale F. Halton Arena (3,441); Charlotte, NC
March 1, 2018; 5:00 p.m.		Old Dominion	W 51–43	13–15 (9–6)	Dale F. Halton Arena (3,305); Charlotte, NC
March 3, 2018; 5:00 p.m.		Florida Atlantic	W 83–69	14–15 (10–6)	Dale F. Halton Arena (4,587); Charlotte, NC
Conference USA women's tournament
March 7, 2018; 3:00 p.m.	(6)	vs. (11) North Texas; First round	L 55–58	14–16	The Ford Center at The Star (2,031); Frisco, TX
*Non-conference game. ^{#}Rankings from AP poll. (#) Tournament seedings in parentheses. All times are in Eastern.

== Rankings ==
Regular-season polls
Poll	Pre- season	Week 2	Week 3	Week 4	Week 5	Week 6	Week 7	Week 8	Week 9	Week 10	Week 11	Week 12	Week 13	Week 14	Week 15	Week 16	Week 17	Week 18	Week 19	Final
AP																				N/A
Coaches																				

Legend
	Increase in ranking
	Decrease in ranking
	No change
(RV)	Received votes
(NR)	Not ranked

== See also ==
- 2017–18 Charlotte 49ers men's basketball team
