= 2017–18 Indiana Hoosiers women's basketball team =

Intercollegiate basketball season

2017–18 Indiana Hoosiers women's basketball

WNIT Champions
- Conference: Big Ten Conference
- Record: 23–14 (9–7 Big Ten)
- Head coach: Teri Moren (4th season)
- Assistant coaches: Rhet Wierzba; Janese Banks; Glenn Box
- Home arena: Simon Skjodt Assembly Hall

2017–18 Big Ten women's basketball standings
	Conf.				Overall
Team	W		L	PCT	W		L	PCT
No. 10 Ohio State †	13	–	3	.813	28	–	7	.800
No. 16 Maryland	12	–	4	.750	26	–	8	.765
Iowa	11	–	5	.688	24	–	8	.750
Minnesota	11	–	5	.688	24	–	9	.727
Nebraska	11	–	5	.688	21	–	11	.656
Michigan	10	–	6	.625	23	–	10	.697
Indiana	9	–	7	.563	23	–	14	.622
Purdue	9	–	7	.563	20	–	14	.588
Rutgers	7	–	9	.438	20	–	12	.625
Michigan State	7	–	9	.438	19	–	14	.576
Penn State	6	–	10	.375	16	–	16	.500
Northwestern	4	–	12	.250	12	–	20	.375
Wisconsin	2	–	14	.125	9	–	21	.300
Illinois	0	–	16	.000	9	–	21	.300
† 2018 Big Ten tournament winner Rankings from AP poll

The 2017–18 Indiana Hoosiers women's basketball team represented Indiana University Bloomington during the 2017–18 NCAA Division I women's basketball season. The Hoosiers were led by fourth year head coach Teri Moren and played their home games at Simon Skjodt Assembly Hall as a member of the Big Ten Conference. They finished the season of 23–14, 9–7 in Big Ten play to finish in a tie for fourth place. They lost in the quarterfinals of the Big Ten women's tournament to Maryland. They were invited to the Women's National Invitation Tournament, where they advanced to the finals and defeated Virginia Tech for the championship.

== Roster ==
2017–18 Indiana Hoosiers women's basketball team
Players
Coaches

Pos.	#	Name	Height	Year	Previous school	Hometown
G	1	Bendu Yeaney	5 ft 10 in (1.78 m)	Fr	St. Mary's Academy	Portland, OR
G	2	Keyanna Warthen	5 ft 10 in (1.78 m)	Fr	Fort Lauderdale	Fort Lauderdale, FL
G	3	Tyra Buss	5 ft 8 in (1.73 m)	Sr	Mount Carmel	Mount Carmel, IL
G	5	Grace Withrow (W)	5 ft 6 in (1.68 m)	Jr	Valparaiso	Valparaiso, IN
F	11	Kym Royster	6 ft 2 in (1.88 m)	Jr	Newark	Newark, OH
C	12	Linsey Marchese	6 ft 4 in (1.93 m)	Fr	Archer	Dacula, GA
G	13	Jaelynn Penn	5 ft 10 in (1.78 m)	Fr	Butler	Louisville, KY
G	14	Ali Patberg	5 ft 11 in (1.8 m)	RS So	Columbus North; Notre Dame	Columbus, IN
F	23	Alexis Johnson	6 ft 1 in (1.85 m)	Fr	The Kinkaid School	Houston, TX
F	31	Bre Wickware	6 ft 2 in (1.88 m)	So	Guyer	Denton, TX
F	33	Amanda Cahill	6 ft 2 in (1.88 m)	Sr	Clyde	Clyde, OH
F	50	Brenna Wise	6 ft 0 in (1.83 m)	Jr	Vincentian Academy; Pittsburgh	Pittsburgh, PA

Head coach

- Teri Moren (Purdue)

Assistant coach(es)

- Rhet Wierzba (Austin Peay)
- Janese Banks (Oral Roberts)
- Glenn Box (Southeast Missouri State)

Legend

- (C) Team captain
- (S) Suspended
- (I) Ineligible
- (W) Walk-on
- Injured
- Current redshirt

Roster

== Schedule ==
Date time, TV	Rank^{#}	Opponent^{#}	Result	Record	High points	High rebounds	High assists	Site (attendance) city, state
Exhibition
Nov 06, 2017*; 7:00 pm		Gannon	W 82–38		23 – Buss	9 – Buss	4 – Tied	Simon Skjodt Assembly Hall; Bloomington, IN
Non-conference regular season
Nov 11, 2017*; 2:00 pm		Arkansas State	W 93–51	1–0	28 – Buss	12 – Cahill	11 – Buss	Simon Skjodt Assembly Hall (2,790); Bloomington, IN
Nov 14, 2017*; 7:00 pm		Southern	W 64–49	2–0	23 – Buss	15 – Royster	5 – Buss	Simon Skjodt Assembly Hall (2,194); Bloomington, IN
Nov 17, 2017*; 7:00 pm		Western Kentucky	W 73–71	3–0	22 – Buss	13 – Cahill	6 – Cahill	Simon Skjodt Assembly Hall (3,063); Bloomington, IN
Nov 20, 2017*; 7:00 pm		Chattanooga	L 61–64	3–1	17 – Buss	10 – Cahill	10 – Buss	Simon Skjodt Assembly Hall (2,492); Bloomington, IN
Nov 24, 2017*; 3:00 pm		vs. UAB; Hilton Concord Classic	W 71–63	4–1	22 – Buss	13 – Royster	3 – Buss	McKeon Pavilion (142); Moraga, CA
Nov 25, 2017*; 5:00 pm		at Saint Mary's; Hilton Concord Classic	L 82–88	4–2	24 – Buss	9 – Penn	7 – Buss	McKeon Pavilion (312); Moraga, CA
Nov 30, 2017*; 8:00 pm, BTN		No. 4 Louisville; ACC–Big Ten Women's Challenge	L 59–72	4–3	17 – Penn	8 – Royster	6 – Cahill	Simon Skjodt Assembly Hall (2,853); Bloomington, IN
Dec 03, 2017*; 2:00 pm		Auburn	L 53–65	4–4	16 – Penn	10 – Penn	7 – Cahill	Simon Skjodt Assembly Hall (2,966); Bloomington, IN
Dec 05, 2017*; 7:00 pm		North Texas	W 68–63	5–4	26 – Buss	12 – Cahill	5 – Buss	Simon Skjodt Assembly Hall (2,303); Bloomington, IN
Dec 09, 2017*; 7:00 pm		at Northern Kentucky	W 67–56	6–4	25 – Buss	9 – Cahill	3 – Tied	BB&T Arena (1,034); Highland Heights, KY
Dec 17, 2017*; 1:15 pm		vs. No. 16 Missouri; West Palm Invitational	L 55–75	6–5	18 – Cahill	6 – Royster	6 – Buss	Student Life Center (350); West Palm Beach, FL
Dec 18, 2017*; 12:00 pm		vs. Virginia; West Palm Invitational	L 72–82 ^{OT}	6–6	28 – Buss	8 – Royster	4 – Tied	Student Life Center (150); West Palm Beach, FL
Dec 21, 2017*; 1:00 pm		at Yale	W 72–68	7–6	20 – Buss	8 – Yeaney	7 – Buss	John J. Lee Amphitheater (311); New Haven, CT
Big Ten regular Season
Dec 28, 2017; 7:00 pm		Michigan State	L 46–68	7–7 (0–1)	13 – Yeaney	8 – Royster	4 – Cahill	Simon Skjodt Assembly Hall (4,303); Bloomington, IN
Dec 31, 2017; 2:00 pm, ESPN2		at No. 12 Ohio State	L 70–85	7–8 (0–2)	24 – Buss	9 – Cahill	4 – Penn	Value City Arena (6,364); Columbus, OH
Jan 03, 2018; 7:00 pm		at Penn State	L 74–77	7–9 (0–3)	21 – Cahill	12 – Cahill	6 – Penn	Bryce Jordan Center (2,252); University Park, PA
Jan 06, 2018; 2:00 pm		Purdue; Rivalry/Crimson and Gold Cup	W 72–54	8–9 (1–3)	19 – Buss	6 – Tied	9 – Buss	Simon Skjodt Assembly Hall (4,768); Bloomington, IN
Jan 10, 2018; 7:00 pm		at No. 23 Michigan	L 79–84	8–10 (1–4)	18 – Tied	4 – Tied	5 – Buss	Crisler Center (2,018); Ann Arbor, MI
Jan 13, 2018; 12:00 pm, BTN		No. 10 Ohio State	L 62–77	8–11 (1–5)	20 – Penn	10 – Cahill	6 – Yeaney	Simon Skjodt Assembly Hall (2,983); Bloomington, IN
Jan 16, 2018; 7:00 pm		at No. 14 Maryland	L 70–74	8–12 (1–6)	18 – Tied	10 – Yeaney	8 – Buss	Xfinity Center (3,947); College Park, MD
Jan 20, 2018; 4:00 pm, BTN		at Michigan State	W 69–65	9–12 (2–6)	28 – Buss	9 – Cahill	7 – Buss	Breslin Center (11,950); East Lansing, MI
Jan 24, 2018; 7:00 pm		Wisconsin	W 69–55	10–12 (3–6)	27 – Buss	11 – Cahill	4 – Buss	Simon Skjodt Assembly Hall (2,574); Bloomington, IN
Jan 27, 2018; 1:00 pm, BTN		Rutgers	W 64–58	11–12 (4–6)	14 – 3 tied	7 – Cahill	4 – Buss	Simon Skjodt Assembly Hall (3,340); Bloomington, IN
Feb 04, 2018; 12:00 pm, BTN		Northwestern	W 78–73 ^{OT}	12–12 (5–6)	31 – Buss	6 – Tied	4 – 3 tied	Simon Skjodt Assembly Hall (3,786); Bloomington, IN
Feb 08, 2018; 7:00 pm		Illinois	W 70–54	13–12 (6–6)	20 – Cahill	6 – 4 tied	6 – Buss	Simon Skjodt Assembly Hall (2,852); Bloomington, IN
Feb 12, 2018; 7:00 pm, BTN		at Purdue; Rivalry/Crimson and Gold Cup	W 52–44	14–12 (7–6)	16 – Cahill	11 – Cahill	4 – Penn	Mackey Arena (7,054); West Lafayette, IN
Feb 17, 2018; 12:00 pm, BTN		Nebraska	W 83–75	15–12 (8–6)	37 – Buss	10 – Cahill	5 – Buss	Simon Skjodt Assembly Hall (5,258); Bloomington, IN
Feb 20, 2018; 8:00 pm		at Minnesota	W 82–70	16–12 (9–6)	36 – Buss	10 – Yeaney	7 – Buss	Williams Arena (3,477); Minneapolis, MN
Feb 24, 2018; 12:00 pm, BTN		at Iowa	L 62–75	16–13 (9–7)	14 – Cahill	8 – Cahill	7 – Buss	Carver–Hawkeye Arena (6,921); Iowa City, IA
Big Ten Women's Tournament
Mar 01, 2018; 6:30 pm, RSN	(7)	vs. (10) Michigan State; Second Round	W 111–109 ^{4OT}	17–13	38 – Cahill	9 – Cahill	8 – Buss	Bankers Life Fieldhouse; Indianapolis, IN
Mar 02, 2018; 6:30 pm, RSN	(7)	vs. (2) Maryland; Quarterfinals	L 54–67	17–14	17 – Cahill	7 – Royster	3 – Buss	Bankers Life Fieldhouse; Indianapolis, IN
Women's National Invitation Tournament
Mar 15, 2018*; 7:00 pm		UT Martin; First Round	W 74–50	18–14	25 – Penn	9 – Cahill	4 – Yeaney	Simon Skjodt Assembly Hall (2,324); Bloomington, IN
Mar 18, 2018*; 2:00 pm		Milwaukee; Second Round	W 74–54	19–14	17 – Buss	9 – Royster	6 – Cahill	Simon Skjodt Assembly Hall (2,913); Bloomington, IN
Mar 22, 2018*; 7:00 pm		Purdue; Third Round/Rivalry	W 73–51	20–14	24 – Buss	7 – Cahill	6 – Buss	Simon Skjodt Assembly Hall (5,564); Bloomington, IN
Mar 25, 2018*; 2:00 pm		UC Davis; Quarterfinals	W 81–66	21–14	30 – Buss	10 – Cahill	5 – Buss	Simon Skjodt Assembly Hall (6,001); Bloomington, IN
Mar 28, 2018*; 7:00 pm		TCU; Semifinals	W 71–58	22–14	22 – Buss	10 – Royster	4 – Yeaney	Simon Skjodt Assembly Hall (7,815); Bloomington, IN
Mar 31, 2018*; 3:00 pm, CBSSN		Virginia Tech; Championship Game	W 65–57	23–14	16 – Buss	10 – Penn	2 – Tied	Simon Skjodt Assembly Hall (13,007); Bloomington, IN
*Non-conference game. ^{#}Rankings from AP Poll. (#) Tournament seedings in parentheses. All times are in Eastern Time.

== Rankings ==
Ranking movement Legend: ██ Increase in ranking. ██ Decrease in ranking. NR = Not ranked. RV = Received votes.
Poll	Pre	Wk 2	Wk 3	Wk 4	Wk 5	Wk 6	Wk 7	Wk 8	Wk 9	Wk 10	Wk 11	Wk 12	Wk 13	Wk 14	Wk 15	Wk 16	Wk 17	Wk 18	Wk 19	Final
AP																				N/A
Coaches																				RV

== See also ==
2017–18 Indiana Hoosiers men's basketball team
