= 2017–18 Michigan State Spartans women's basketball team =

Intercollegiate basketball season

2017–18 Michigan State Spartans women's basketball

WNIT, third round
- Conference: Big Ten Conference
- Record: 19–14 (7–9 Big Ten)
- Head coach: Suzy Merchant (11th season)
- Assistant coaches: Amaka Agugua-Hamilton; Maria Fantanarosa; Alysiah Bond
- Home arena: Breslin Center

2017–18 Big Ten women's basketball standings
	Conf.				Overall
Team	W		L	PCT	W		L	PCT
No. 10 Ohio State †	13	–	3	.813	28	–	7	.800
No. 16 Maryland	12	–	4	.750	26	–	8	.765
Iowa	11	–	5	.688	24	–	8	.750
Minnesota	11	–	5	.688	24	–	9	.727
Nebraska	11	–	5	.688	21	–	11	.656
Michigan	10	–	6	.625	23	–	10	.697
Indiana	9	–	7	.563	23	–	14	.622
Purdue	9	–	7	.563	20	–	14	.588
Rutgers	7	–	9	.438	20	–	12	.625
Michigan State	7	–	9	.438	19	–	14	.576
Penn State	6	–	10	.375	16	–	16	.500
Northwestern	4	–	12	.250	12	–	20	.375
Wisconsin	2	–	14	.125	9	–	21	.300
Illinois	0	–	16	.000	9	–	21	.300
† 2018 Big Ten tournament winner Rankings from AP poll

The 2017–18 Michigan State Spartans women's basketball team represented Michigan State University during the 2017–18 NCAA Division I women's basketball season. The Spartans, led by 11th-year head coach Suzy Merchant, played their home games at the Breslin Center in East Lansing, Michigan as members of the Big Ten Conference. They finished the season 19–14, 7–9 in Big Ten play to finish in a tie for ninth place. They lost in the second round of the Big Ten women's tournament to Indiana. They received an at-large bid to the Women's National Invitation Tournament where they defeated Cincinnati and Toledo before losing to South Dakota in the third round.

== Previous season ==
The Spartans finished the 2016–17 season 21–12, 9–7 in Big Ten play to finish in a tie for sixth place. In the Big Ten tournament, they beat Wisconsin and Michigan before losing in the semifinals to Maryland. They received an at-large bid to the NCAA tournament as a No. 8 seed where the lost in the First Round to Arizona State.

== Roster ==
2017–18 Michigan State Spartans women's basketball team
Players
Coaches

Pos.	#	Name	Height	Year	Previous school	Hometown
G	0	Shay Colley	5 ft 8 in (1.73 m)	RS So	St. Edmund Campion Secondary; South Carolina	Brampton, ON
F	1	Sidney Cooks	6 ft 4 in (1.93 m)	Fr	St. Joseph	Kenosha, WI
F	2	Mardrekia Cook	6 ft 0 in (1.83 m)	So	Muskegon	Muskegon, MI
G	4	Taryn McCutcheon	5 ft 5 in (1.65 m)	So	East Lansing	East Lansing, MI
G	5	Claire Hendrickson	5 ft 11 in (1.8 m)	Fr	Wyoming	Wyoming, MI
G	10	Brannadais Agee	5 ft 11 in (1.8 m)	RS Sr	Cass Technical	Detroit, MI
F	11	Nathy Dambo	6 ft 3 in (1.91 m)	RS So	Junípero Serra	Fort-de-France, Martinique
F	12	Nia Hollie	6 ft 0 in (1.83 m)	So	Hopkins	Minnetonka, MN
F	15	Victoria Gaines	6 ft 1 in (1.85 m)	RS So	Merrillville	Merrillville, IN
G	22	Kiara Carter	5 ft 1 in (1.55 m)	Sr	Homewood Flossmoor	Homewood, IL
G/F	24	Lexi Gussert	6 ft 0 in (1.83 m)	Sr	Forest Park	Crystal Falls, MI
F	32	Taya Reimer	6 ft 4 in (1.93 m)	RS Sr	Hamilton Southeastern; Notre Dame	Fishers, IN
C	33	Jenna Allen	6 ft 3 in (1.91 m)	Jr	North Lawrence	Bedford, IN
F	55	Kennedy Johnson	6 ft 2 in (1.88 m)	Sr	Wildwood Catholic	Galloway, NJ

Head coach

- Suzy Merchant (Central Michigan)

Assistant coach(es)

- Amaka Agugua-Hamilton (Hofstra)
- Maria Fantanarosa (Miami (OH))
- Alysiah Bond (Ohio State)

Legend

- (C) Team captain
- (S) Suspended
- (I) Ineligible
- (W) Walk-on
- Injured
- Current redshirt

Roster
Last update: November 24, 2017

== Schedule and results ==
Date time, TV	Rank^{#}	Opponent^{#}	Result	Record	Site (attendance) city, state
Exhibition
Nov 05, 2017*; 2:00 pm		Lake Superior State	W 111–37		Breslin Center (4,919); East Lansing, MI
Non-conference regular season
Nov 11, 2017*; 4:00 pm		Robert Morris	W 100–58	1–0	Breslin Center (5,038); East Lansing, MI
Nov 13, 2017*; 7:00 pm		Oakland	W 95–63	2–0	Breslin Center (4,362); East Lansing, MI
Nov 19, 2017*; 12:00 pm		College of Charleston	W 107–43	3–0	Breslin Center (4,425); East Lansing, MI
Nov 21, 2017*; 7:00 pm, ESPN3		at Detroit	W 97–60	4–0	Calihan Hall (817); Detroit, MI
Nov 25, 2017*; 3:00 pm, SNY		vs. No. 1 Connecticut; Phil Knight Invitational	L 62–96	4–1	Matthew Knight Arena (6,033); Eugene, OR
Nov 30, 2017*; 7:00 pm, ESPN3		at Miami (FL); ACC–Big Ten Women's Challenge	L 57–67	4–2	Watsco Center (1,062); Coral Gables, FL
Dec 03, 2017*; 12:30 pm		Western Michigan	W 65–62	5–2	Breslin Center (6,313); East Lansing, MI
Dec 06, 2017*; 7:00 pm		at No. 3 Notre Dame	L 59–90	5–3	Edmund P. Joyce Center (9,149); Notre Dame, IN
Dec 09, 2017*; 2:00 pm		Rhode Island	W 82–38	6–3	Breslin Center (5,743); East Lansing, MI
Dec 16, 2017*; 7:00 pm, ESPN3		at East Tennessee State	W 83–74	7–3	J. Madison Brooks Gymnasium (1,100); Johnson City, TN
Dec 18, 2017*; 9:00 pm		Quinnipiac	W 74–55	8–3	Breslin Center (4,220); East Lansing, MI
Dec 21, 2017*; 8:30 pm		vs. No. 22 South Florida; New Orleans Shootout	W 83–73	9–3	Convocation Center (420); New Orleans, LA
Dec 22, 2017*; 6:00 pm		vs. Mississippi Valley State; New Orleans Shootout	W 83–64	10–3	Convocation Center (335); New Orleans, LA
Big Ten regular season
Dec 28, 2017; 7:00 pm		at Indiana	W 68–46	11–3 (1–0)	Simon Skjodt Assembly Hall (4,303); Bloomington, IN
Dec 31, 2017; 4:00 pm		Rutgers	L 58–62	11–4 (1–1)	Breslin Center (6,251); East Lansing, MI
Jan 03, 2018; 7:00 pm		Northwestern	W 81–51	12–4 (2–1)	Breslin Center (6,079); East Lansing, MI
Jan 07, 2018; 4:00 pm, BTN		at Minnesota	L 77–83	12–5 (2–2)	Williams Arena (3,422); Minneapolis, MN
Jan 11, 2018; 8:00 pm, BTN		at No. 11 Maryland	W 82–68	13–5 (3–2)	Xfinity Center (4,052); College Park, MD
Jan 16, 2018; 9:00 pm, BTN		at Illinois	W 67–55	14–5 (4–2)	State Farm Center (1,114); Champaign, IL
Jan 20, 2018; 4:00 pm, BTN		Indiana	L 65–69	14–6 (4–3)	Breslin Center (11,950); East Lansing, MI
Jan 23, 2018; 7:00 pm, BTN		at No. 16 Michigan	L 48–71	14–7 (4–4)	Crisler Center (3,147); Ann Arbor, MI
Jan 27, 2018; 12:00 pm, ESPNU		at No. 12 Ohio State	L 62–78	14–8 (4–5)	Value City Arena (6,850); Columbus, OH
Feb 01, 2018; 6:00 pm, BTN		Iowa	L 68–71	14–9 (4–6)	Breslin Center (5,047); East Lansing, MI
Feb 04, 2018; 2:00 pm		at Penn State	L 59–74	14–10 (4–7)	Bryce Jordan Center (3,521); University Park, PA
Feb 08, 2018; 7:00 pm, BTN		No. 10 Maryland	L 68–76	14–11 (4–8)	Breslin Center (4,988); East Lansing, MI
Feb 11, 2018; 12:00 pm, ESPN2		No. 21 Michigan	W 66–61	15–11 (5–8)	Breslin Center (12,434); East Lansing, MI
Feb 14, 2018; 7:00 pm		Nebraska	L 69–79	15–12 (5–9)	Breslin Center (4,972); East Lansing, MI
Feb 21, 2018; 7:00 pm		Wisconsin	W 69–61	16–12 (6–9)	Breslin Center (5,355); East Lansing, MI
Feb 24, 2018; 2:00 pm, BTN		at Purdue	W 82–68	17–12 (7–9)	Mackey Arena (6,800); West Lafayette, IN
Big Ten tournament
Mar 01, 2018; 6:30 pm, RSN	(10)	vs. (7) Indiana; Second Round	L 109–111 ^{4OT}	17–13	Bankers Life Fieldhouse; Indianapolis, IN
WNIT
Mar 15, 2018*; 7:00 pm		Cincinnati; First Round	W 81–75	18–13	Breslin Center (1,705); East Lansing, MI
Mar 19, 2018*; 7:00 pm		Toledo; Second Round	W 68–66	19–13	Breslin Center (2,144); East Lansing, MI
Mar 22, 2018*; 8:00 pm		at South Dakota; Third Round	L 83–85 ^{OT}	19–14	Sanford Coyote Sports Center (3,072); Vermillion, SD
*Non-conference game. ^{#}Rankings from AP Poll. (#) Tournament seedings in parentheses. All times are in Eastern Time; Source.

== Rankings ==
2017–18 NCAA Division I women's basketball rankings

Regular season polls
Poll	Pre- season	Week 2	Week 3	Week 4	Week 5	Week 6	Week 7	Week 8	Week 9	Week 10	Week 11	Week 12	Week 13	Week 14	Week 15	Week 16	Week 17	Week 18	Week 19	Final
AP	RV	RV	RV	RV	NR	NR	NR	NR	NR	NR	RV	NR	NR	NR	NR	NR	NR	NR		N/A
Coaches	RV	N/A	RV	RV	NR	NR	NR	RV	NR	NR	RV	RV	NR	NR	NR	NR	NR	NR		

Legend
	Increase in ranking
	Decrease in ranking
	No change
(RV)	Received votes
(NR)	Not ranked

== See also ==
2017–18 Michigan State Spartans men's basketball team
