= 2017–18 Iowa Hawkeyes women's basketball team =

American college basketball season

2017–18 Iowa Hawkeyes women's basketball

NCAA tournament, first round
- Conference: Big Ten Conference
- Record: 24–8 (11–5 Big Ten)
- Head coach: Lisa Bluder (18th season)
- Assistant coaches: Jan Jensen; Jenni Fitzgerald; Raina Harmon
- Home arena: Carver–Hawkeye Arena

2017–18 Big Ten women's basketball standings
	Conf.				Overall
Team	W		L	PCT	W		L	PCT
No. 10 Ohio State †	13	–	3	.813	28	–	7	.800
No. 16 Maryland	12	–	4	.750	26	–	8	.765
Iowa	11	–	5	.688	24	–	8	.750
Minnesota	11	–	5	.688	24	–	9	.727
Nebraska	11	–	5	.688	21	–	11	.656
Michigan	10	–	6	.625	23	–	10	.697
Indiana	9	–	7	.563	23	–	14	.622
Purdue	9	–	7	.563	20	–	14	.588
Rutgers	7	–	9	.438	20	–	12	.625
Michigan State	7	–	9	.438	19	–	14	.576
Penn State	6	–	10	.375	16	–	16	.500
Northwestern	4	–	12	.250	12	–	20	.375
Wisconsin	2	–	14	.125	9	–	21	.300
Illinois	0	–	16	.000	9	–	21	.300
† 2018 Big Ten tournament winner Rankings from AP poll

The 2017–18 Iowa Hawkeyes women's basketball team represented the University of Iowa during the 2017–18 NCAA Division I women's basketball season. The Hawkeyes, led by 18th year head coach Lisa Bluder, played their home games at Carver–Hawkeye Arena in Iowa City, IA as members of the Big Ten Conference. They finished the season 24–8, 11–5 in Big Ten play to finish in a three-way tie for third place. They defeated Northwestern in the second round before losing to Minnesota in the quarterfinals of the Big Ten women's tournament. They received an at-large bid to the NCAA women's tournament as the No. 6 seed in the Kansas City region. There they lost in the First Round to Creighton.

== Previous season ==
The Hawkeyes finished the 2016–17 season 20–14, 8–8 in Big Ten play to finish in a tie for eighth place. They lost in the second round of the Big Ten women's tournament to Northwestern. They received an invitation to the Women's National Invitation Tournament, where they defeated Missouri State, South Dakota, and Colorado before losing to Washington State in the NIT quarterfinals.

== Roster ==
2017–18 Iowa Hawkeyes women's basketball team
Players
Coaches

Pos.	#	Name	Height	Year	Previous school	Hometown
G	3	Makenzie Meyer	5 ft 10 in (1.78 m)	So	Mason City	Mason City, IA
F	4	Chase Coley	6 ft 3 in (1.91 m)	Sr	Washburn	Minneapolis, MN
G	5	Alexis Sevillian	5 ft 6 in (1.68 m)	RS Fr	Goodrich	Goodrich, MI
F	10	Megan Gustafson	6 ft 3 in (1.91 m)	Jr	South Shore	Port Wing, WI
G	11	Tania Davis	5 ft 4 in (1.63 m)	Jr	Goodrich	Grand Blanc, MI
G	14	Jinaya Houston	6 ft 1 in (1.85 m)	Fr	Davenport North High School	Davenport, IA
F	21	Hannah Stewart	6 ft 2 in (1.88 m)	Jr	Bishop Ryan Catholic	Minot, ND
G	22	Kathleen Doyle (C)	5 ft 9 in (1.75 m)	So	Benet Academy	LaGrange Park, IL
G	24	Zion Sanders (W)	5 ft 8 in (1.73 m)	Fr	Central	Evansville, IN
F/C	31	Paula Valiño Ramos	6 ft 3 in (1.91 m)	Fr	Ies Otero Pedrayo	Ourense, SP, Brazil
F	34	Carly Mohns	6 ft 1 in (1.85 m)	RS Jr	Brodhead	Brodhead, WI
F	43	Amanda Ollinger	6 ft 1 in (1.85 m)	So	Linn-Mar	Cedar Rapids, IA

Head coach

- Lisa Bluder (Northern Iowa)

Assistant coach(es)

- Jan Jensen (Drake)
- Jenni Fitzgerald (Drake)
- Raina Harmon (Central Michigan)

Legend

- (C) Team captain
- (S) Suspended
- (I) Ineligible
- (W) Walk-on
- Injured
- Current redshirt

Roster
Last update: August 7, 2017

== Schedule and results ==
Date time, TV	Rank^{#}	Opponent^{#}	Result	Record	High points	High rebounds	High assists	Site (attendance) city, state
Exhibition
Nov 5, 2017*; 7:00 pm		Minnesota State-Moorhead	W 85–56	–	22 – Gustafson	10 – Tied	6 – Meyer	Carver–Hawkeye Arena (3,430); Iowa City, IA
Non-conference regular season
Nov 10, 2017*; 5:00 pm		Quinnipiac; 2017 Hawkeye Challenge	W 83–67	1–0	17 – Doyle	15 – Gustafson	5 – Stewart	Carver–Hawkeye Arena (3,758); Iowa City, IA
Nov 11, 2017*; 4:30 pm		Western Kentucky; 2017 Hawkeye Challenge	W 104–97 ^{OT}	2–0	35 – Gustafson	17 – Gustafson	9 – Davis	Carver–Hawkeye Arena (3,649); Iowa City, IA
Nov 15, 2017*; 7:00 pm		Northern Illinois	W 105–80	3–0	22 – Gustafson	11 – Gustafson	8 – Meyer	Carver–Hawkeye Arena (3,504); Iowa City, IA
Nov 19, 2017*; 2:00 pm		Western Michigan	W 79–56	4–0	21 – Meyer	13 – Gustafson	6 – Sevillian	Carver–Hawkeye Arena (3,578); Iowa City, IA
Nov 22, 2017*; 12:30 pm		vs. Morgan State; 2017 Puerto Rico Classic	W 90–46	5–0	18 – Gustafson	10 – Gustafson	7 – Meyer	Cardinal Gibbons High School (117); Fort Lauderdale, FL
Nov 23, 2017*; 11:00 am		vs. Charlotte; 2017 Puerto Rico Classic	W 77–64	6–0	23 – Gustafson	14 – Gustafson	7 – Meyer	Cardinal Gibbons High School (172); Fort Lauderdale, FL
Nov 25, 2017*; 4:00 pm		vs. Elon; 2017 Puerto Rico Classic	W 74–61	7–0	21 – Sevillian	14 – Gustafson	7 – Doyle	Cardinal Gibbons High School (137); Fort Lauderdale, FL
Nov 29, 2017*; 7:00 pm, BTN		No. 13 Florida State; ACC–Big Ten Women's Challenge	L 93–94	7–1	34 – Gustafson	9 – Tied	6 – Meyer	Carver–Hawkeye Arena (4,202); Iowa City, IA
Dec 3, 2017*; 2:00 pm		Samford	W 80–59	8–1	18 – Gustafson	11 – Gustafson	7 – Davis	Carver–Hawkeye Arena (3,785); Iowa City, IA
Dec 6, 2017*; 6:30 pm		at Iowa State; Iowa Corn Cy-Hawk Series	W 61–55	9–1	16 – Meyer	14 – Gustafson	5 – Davis	Hilton Coliseum (10,916); Ames, IA
Dec 9, 2017*; 2:00 pm		Arkansas-Pine Bluff	W 85–43	10–1	19 – Gustafson	10 – Gustafson	5 – Tied	Carver–Hawkeye Arena (3,806); Iowa City, IA
Dec 17, 2017*; 2:00 pm, ESPN3	No. 25	at Northern Iowa	W 71–47	11–1	26 – Gustafson	10 – Gustafson	7 – Doyle	McLeod Center (3,008); Cedar Falls, IA
Dec 21, 2017*; 7:00 pm	No. 25	Drake	W 79–66	12–1	27 – Gustafson	12 – Gustafson	7 – Meyer	Carver–Hawkeye Arena (4,847); Iowa City, IA
Big Ten conference season
Dec 28, 2017; 7:00 pm	No. 23	at Wisconsin	W 56–46	13–1 (1–0)	21 – Gustafson	16 – Gustafson	7 – Doyle	Kohl Center (3,865); Madison, WI
Dec 31, 2017; 3:00 pm, BTN	No. 23	No. 21 Michigan	W 82–72	14–1 (2–0)	27 – Gustafson	11 – Gustafson	9 – Doyle	Carver–Hawkeye Arena (6,928); Iowa City, IA
Jan 4, 2018; 5:00 pm, BTN	No. 18	at No. 13 Maryland	L 64–80	14–2 (2–1)	15 – Gustafson	15 – Gustafson	11 – Doyle	Xfinity Center (3,841); College Park, MD
Jan 7, 2018; 1:00 pm, BTN	No. 18	at Illinois	W 84–71	15–2 (3–1)	34 – Gustafson	12 – Gustafson	10 – Doyle	State Farm Center (1,646); Champaign, IL
Jan 13, 2018; 3:00 pm, BTN	No. 18	Purdue	L 70–76	15–3 (3–2)	37 – Gustafson	14 – Gustafson	10 – Doyle	Carver–Hawkeye Arena (7,477); Iowa City, IA
Jan 16, 2018; 7:00 pm	No. 20	at Nebraska	L 65–74	15–4 (3–3)	29 – Gustafson	18 – Gustafson	5 – Doyle	Pinnacle Bank Arena (3,667); Lincoln, NE
Jan 21, 2018; 3:00 pm	No. 20	at Minnesota	L 72–77	15–5 (3–4)	20 – Gustafson	10 – Gustafson	4 – 3 tied	Williams Arena (4,182); Minneapolis, MN
Jan 25, 2018; 7:00 pm		No. 12 Ohio State	W 103–89	16–5 (4–4)	29 – Gustafson	11 – Coley	11 – Doyle	Carver–Hawkeye Arena (6,012); Iowa City, IA
Jan 28, 2018; 2:00 pm		Nebraska	L 74–92	16–6 (4–5)	26 – Gustafson	10 – Gustafson	4 – Tied	Carver–Hawkeye Arena (8,823); Iowa City, IA
Feb 1, 2018; 5:00 pm, BTN		at Michigan State	W 71–68	17–6 (5–5)	36 – Gustafson	17 – Gustafson	11 – Doyle	Breslin Center (5,047); East Lansing, MI
Feb 4, 2018; 2:00 pm		Minnesota	W 92–84	18–6 (6–5)	25 – Gustafson	15 – Gustafson	8 – Doyle	Carver–Hawkeye Arena (6,581); Iowa City, IA
Feb 8, 2018; 7:00 pm		Penn State	W 80–76	19–6 (7–5)	33 – Gustafson	14 – Gustafson	7 – Meyer	Carver–Hawkeye Arena (5,878); Iowa City, IA
Feb 11, 2018; 2:00 pm		at Northwestern	W 70–61	20–6 (8–5)	25 – Gustafson	16 – Gustafson	6 – Doyle	Beardsley Gym (1,363); Evanston, IL
Feb 18, 2018; 2:00 pm		Wisconsin	W 88–61	21–6 (9–5)	25 – Gustafson	8 – Gustafson	6 – 2 tied	Carver–Hawkeye Arena (7,495); Iowa City, IA
Feb 21, 2018; 6:00 pm		at Rutgers	W 77–67 ^{OT}	22–6 (10–5)	27 – Gustafson	14 – Gustafson	9 – Doyle	Louis Brown Athletic Center (1,852); Piscataway, NJ
Feb 24, 2018; 11:00 am, BTN		Indiana	W 75–62	23–6 (11–5)	36 – Gustafson	15 – Gustafson	5 – Coley	Carver–Hawkeye Arena (6,921); Iowa City, IA
Big Ten Women's Tournament
Mar 1, 2018; 1:30 pm, RSN	(5)	vs. (12) Northwestern; Second Round	W 55–45	24–6	13 – Meyer	9 – Gustafson	7 – Doyle	Bankers Life Fieldhouse (3,447); Indianapolis, IN
Mar 2, 2018; 1:30 pm, RSN	(5)	vs. (4) Minnesota; Quarterfinals	L 89–90	24–7	48 – Gustafson	15 – Gustafson	7 – Doyle	Bankers Life Fieldhouse (5,274); Indianapolis, IN
NCAA Women's Tournament
Mar 17, 2018*; 5:00 pm, ESPN2	(6 KC)	vs. (11 KC) Creighton; First Round	L 70–76	24–8	29 – Gustafson	17 – Gustafson	8 – Doyle	Pauley Pavilion (2,304); Los Angeles, CA
*Non-conference game. ^{#}Rankings from AP Poll. (#) Tournament seedings in parentheses. KC=Kansas City Region. All times are in Central Time.

== Rankings ==
Regular season polls
Poll	Pre- Season	Week 2	Week 3	Week 4	Week 5	Week 6	Week 7	Week 8	Week 9	Week 10	Week 11	Week 12	Week 13	Week 14	Week 15	Week 16	Week 17	Week 18	Week 19	Final
AP	NR	RV	RV	RV	RV	25	25	23	18	18т	20	RV	RV	RV	RV	RV	RV	RV	RV	N/A
Coaches	NR	N/A	RV	RV	25	25	25	25	17	17	20	25	RV	RV	NR	NR	NR	RV	NR	NR

Legend
	Increase in ranking
	Decrease in ranking
	Not ranked previous week
(RV)	Received Votes

== See also ==
- 2017–18 Iowa Hawkeyes men's basketball team
