= 2017–18 Penn State Lady Lions basketball team =

Intercollegiate basketball season

2017–18 Penn State Lady Lions basketball

WNIT, First Round
- Conference: Big Ten Conference
- Record: 16–16 (6–10 Big Ten)
- Head coach: Coquese Washington (11th season)
- Assistant coaches: Itoro Coleman; Tamika Williams-Jeter; Jocelyn Wyatt
- Home arena: Bryce Jordan Center

2017–18 Big Ten women's basketball standings
	Conf.				Overall
Team	W		L	PCT	W		L	PCT
No. 10 Ohio State †	13	–	3	.813	28	–	7	.800
No. 16 Maryland	12	–	4	.750	26	–	8	.765
Iowa	11	–	5	.688	24	–	8	.750
Minnesota	11	–	5	.688	24	–	9	.727
Nebraska	11	–	5	.688	21	–	11	.656
Michigan	10	–	6	.625	23	–	10	.697
Indiana	9	–	7	.563	23	–	14	.622
Purdue	9	–	7	.563	20	–	14	.588
Rutgers	7	–	9	.438	20	–	12	.625
Michigan State	7	–	9	.438	19	–	14	.576
Penn State	6	–	10	.375	16	–	16	.500
Northwestern	4	–	12	.250	12	–	20	.375
Wisconsin	2	–	14	.125	9	–	21	.300
Illinois	0	–	16	.000	9	–	21	.300
† 2018 Big Ten tournament winner Rankings from AP poll

The 2017–18 Penn State Lady Lions basketball team represented Pennsylvania State University during the 2017–18 NCAA Division I women's basketball season. The Lady Lions, led by 11th-year head coach Coquese Washington, played their home games at the Bryce Jordan Center as members of the Big Ten Conference. They finished the season of 16–16, 6–10 in Big Ten play to finish in a tie for sixth place. They defeated Illinois in the first round of the Big Ten women's tournament before losing to Michigan. They received an at-large bid to the Women's National Invitation Tournament, where they lost to Radford in the first round.

== Previous season ==
The Lady Lions finished the 2016–17 season 21–11, 9–7 in Big Ten play to finish in a tie for sixth place. They lost in the second round of the Big Ten women's tournament to Minnesota. They were invited to the Women's National Invitation Tournament, where they defeated Ohio and Fordham before losing to Virginia Tech in the third round.

== Roster ==
2017–18 Penn State Nittany Lions women's basketball team
Players
Coaches

Pos.	#	Name	Height	Year	Previous school	Hometown
F	1	Alisia Smith	6 ft 3 in (1.91 m)	Fr	Waverly	Lansing, MI
G	2	Amari Carter	5 ft 8 in (1.73 m)	RS So	St. John's College	Washington, D.C.
G	4	Siyeh Frazier	5 ft 9 in (1.75 m)	So	Renaissance	Detroit, MI
G	5	Kemaria McDaniel	5 ft 10 in (1.78 m)	Fr	Dearborn Heights Robichaud	Inkster, MI
G	11	Teniya Page	5 ft 7 in (1.7 m)	Jr	Marian Catholic	Chicago, IL
G	22	Leah Knizner	5 ft 9 in (1.75 m)	Jr	Hempfield Area	Greensburg, PA
F	23	Jaylen Williams	6 ft 3 in (1.91 m)	Jr	Archbishop Williams	Easton, MA
F	24	Sam Breen	6 ft 1 in (1.85 m)	Fr	Cardinal Wuerl North Catholic	Gibsonia, PA
G	31	Jaida Travascio-Green	6 ft 2 in (1.88 m)	So	Downers Grove North	Lisle, IL
G	34	Sarah McMurtry	5 ft 6 in (1.68 m)	Jr	Upper St. Clair	Pittsburgh, PA
F	35	De'Janae Boykin	6 ft 2 in (1.88 m)	RS So	Charles Herbert Flowers; Connecticut	Springdale, MD

Head coach

- Coquese Washington (Notre Dame)

Assistant coach(es)

- Itoro Coleman (Clemson)
- Tamika Williams-Jeter (Connecticut)
- Jocelyn Wyatt (Appalachian State)

Legend

- (C) Team captain
- (S) Suspended
- (I) Ineligible
- (W) Walk-on
- Injured
- Current redshirt

Roster
Last update: 11/28/2017

== Schedule and results ==
Date time, TV	Rank^{#}	Opponent^{#}	Result	Record	Site (attendance) city, state
Non-conference regular season
Nov 10, 2017*; 7:00 pm		Siena	W 86–72	1–0	Bryce Jordan Center (8,512); University Park, PA
Nov 12, 2017*; 1:00 pm		Drexel	W 84–70	2–0	Bryce Jordan Center (2,504); University Park, PA
Nov 15, 2017*; 6:00 pm		at Marshall	W 80–65	3–0	Cam Henderson Center (1,017); Huntington, WV
Nov 18, 2017*; 1:00 pm		at Providence	W 60–51	4–0	Alumni Hall (422); Providence, RI
Nov 20, 2017*; 6:00 pm		Central Connecticut State	W 83–66	5–0	Bryce Jordan Center (2,052); University Park, PA
Nov 24, 2017*; 8:45 pm		vs. Louisiana Tech; South Point Shootout	L 59–71	5–1	South Point Arena (N/A); Las Vegas, NV
Nov 25, 2017*; 8:45 pm		vs. Kansas State; South Point Shootout	L 65–70	5–2	South Point Arena (N/A); Las Vegas, NV
Nov 30, 2017*; 7:00 pm		Wake Forest; ACC–Big Ten Women's Challenge	W 68–58	6–2	Bryce Jordan Center (2,329); University Park, PA
Dec 3, 2017*; 2:00 pm		Manhattan	W 78–46	7–2	Bryce Jordan Center (3,021); University Park, PA
Dec 6, 2017*; 6:00 pm, BTN		Fordham	W 65–60	8–2	Bryce Jordan Center (2,390); University Park, PA
Dec 9, 2017*; 7:00 pm		at St. Bonaventure	L 62–65	8–3	Reilly Center (1,059); Olean, NY
Dec 17, 2017*; 2:00 pm, ACCN Extra		at Pittsburgh	W 59–48	9–3	Petersen Events Center (2,097); Pittsburgh, PA
Dec 20, 2017*; 1:00 pm		at American	L 66–75 ^{OT}	9–4	Bender Arena (372); Washington, D.C.
Big Ten conference season
Dec 28, 2017; 6:00 pm, BTN		at No. 21 Michigan	L 69–89	9–5 (0–1)	Crisler Center (4,907); Ann Arbor, MI
Dec 31, 2017; 2:00 pm, BTN		No. 15 Maryland	L 65–69	9–6 (0–2)	Bryce Jordan Center (2,612); University Park, PA
Jan 3, 2018; 7:00 pm		Indiana	W 77–74	10–6 (1–2)	Bryce Jordan Center (2,252); University Park, PA
Jan 6, 2018; 4:30 pm, BTN		at Rutgers	L 65–70	10–7 (1–3)	Louis Brown Athletic Center (2,246); Piscataway, NJ
Jan 10, 2018; 7:00 pm		Minnesota	L 71–91	10–8 (1–4)	Bryce Jordan Center (2,326); University Park, PA
Jan 14, 2018; 2:00 pm, BTN		at Wisconsin	W 69–62	11–8 (2–4)	Kohl Center (3,729); Madison, WI
Jan 18, 2018; 7:00 pm		No. 25 Rutgers	W 70–67	12–8 (3–4)	Bryce Jordan Center (2,531); University Park, PA
Jan 23, 2018; 7:00 pm		Illinois	W 68–59	13–8 (4–4)	Bryce Jordan Center (2,326); University Park, PA
Jan 28, 2018; 12:00 pm, BTN		at Purdue	L 73–88	13–9 (4–5)	Mackey Arena (6,970); West Lafayette, IN
Jan 31, 2018; 7:00 pm		at No. 18 Ohio State	L 64–94	13–10 (4–6)	Value City Arena (5,449); Columbus, OH
Feb 4, 2018; 2:00 pm		Michigan State	W 74–59	14–10 (5–6)	Bryce Jordan Center (3,521); University Park, PA
Feb 8, 2018; 8:00 pm		at Iowa	L 76–80	14–11 (5–7)	Carver–Hawkeye Arena (5,878); Iowa City, IA
Feb 11, 2018; 4:00 pm, BTN		at Minnesota	L 68–101	14–12 (5–8)	Williams Arena (3,794); Minneapolis, MN
Feb 14, 2018; 7:00 pm		Northwestern	W 67–59	15–12 (6–8)	Bryce Jordan Center (2,409); University Park, PA
Feb 22, 2018; 8:00 pm, BTN		at Nebraska	L 51–59	15–13 (6–9)	Pinnacle Bank Arena (5,757); Lincoln, NE
Feb 25, 2018; 12:00 pm, ESPN2		No. 14 Ohio State	L 64–89	15–14 (6–10)	Bryce Jordan Center (7,517); University Park, PA
Big Ten Women's Tournament
Feb 28, 2018; 4:00 pm, RSN	(11)	vs. (14) Illinois; First Round	W 83–57	16–14	Bankers Life Fieldhouse (3,119); Indianapolis, IN
Mar 1, 2018; 9:00 pm, RSN	(11)	vs. (6) Michigan; Second Round	L 48–77	16–15	Bankers Life Fieldhouse (3,813); Indianapolis, IN
WNIT
Mar 15, 2018*; 7:00 pm		Radford; First Round	L 62–63 ^{OT}	16–16	Bryce Jordan Center (473); University Park, PA
*Non-conference game. ^{#}Rankings from AP Poll. (#) Tournament seedings in parentheses. All times are in Eastern Time.

== Rankings ==
Regular season polls
Poll	Pre- season	Week 2	Week 3	Week 4	Week 5	Week 6	Week 7	Week 8	Week 9	Week 10	Week 11	Week 12	Week 13	Week 14	Week 15	Week 16	Week 17	Week 18	Week 19	Final
AP																				N/A
Coaches																				

Legend
	Increase in ranking
	Decrease in ranking
	Not ranked previous week
(RV)	Received votes

== See also ==
- 2017–18 Penn State Nittany Lions basketball team
