= 2017–18 Michigan Wolverines women's basketball team =

Intercollegiate basketball season

2017–18 Michigan Wolverines women's basketball

NCAA Women's Tournament, second round L 58-80 vs. Baylor
- Conference: Big Ten Conference
- Record: 23–10 (10–6 Big Ten)
- Head coach: Kim Barnes Arico (6th season)
- Assistant coaches: Melanie Moore; Joy McCorvey; Wesley Brooks
- Home arena: Crisler Center

2017–18 Big Ten women's basketball standings
	Conf.				Overall
Team	W		L	PCT	W		L	PCT
No. 10 Ohio State †	13	–	3	.813	28	–	7	.800
No. 16 Maryland	12	–	4	.750	26	–	8	.765
Iowa	11	–	5	.688	24	–	8	.750
Minnesota	11	–	5	.688	24	–	9	.727
Nebraska	11	–	5	.688	21	–	11	.656
Michigan	10	–	6	.625	23	–	10	.697
Indiana	9	–	7	.563	23	–	14	.622
Purdue	9	–	7	.563	20	–	14	.588
Rutgers	7	–	9	.438	20	–	12	.625
Michigan State	7	–	9	.438	19	–	14	.576
Penn State	6	–	10	.375	16	–	16	.500
Northwestern	4	–	12	.250	12	–	20	.375
Wisconsin	2	–	14	.125	9	–	21	.300
Illinois	0	–	16	.000	9	–	21	.300
† 2018 Big Ten tournament winner Rankings from AP poll

The 2017–18 Michigan Wolverines women's basketball team represented the University of Michigan during the 2017–18 NCAA Division I women's basketball season. The Wolverines, led by 6th year head coach Kim Barnes Arico, played their home games at the Crisler Center and were members of the Big Ten Conference. They finished the season 23–10, 10–6 in Big Ten play to finish in sixth place. They advanced to the quarterfinals of the Big Ten women's tournament, where they lost to Nebraska. They received an at-large bid to the NCAA women's tournament, where they defeated Northern Colorado before losing to Baylor in the second round.

== Roster ==
2017–18 Michigan Wolverines women's basketball team
Players
Coaches

Pos.	#	Name	Height	Year	Previous school	Hometown
G	2	Priscilla Smeenge	6 ft 0 in (1.83 m)	Fr	Celebration	Jacksonville, FL
G	3	Katelynn Flaherty	5 ft 7 in (1.7 m)	Sr	Metuchen	Point Pleasant, NJ
F	5	Kayla Robbins	6 ft 1 in (1.85 m)	So	St. John's College	Mitchellville, MD
G	10	Nicole Munger	5 ft 11 in (1.8 m)	Jr	Central Bucks West	Doylestown, PA
F	11	Jillian Dunston	5 ft 11 in (1.8 m)	Sr	Academy of the Holy Cross	Silver Springs, MD
G	14	Akienreh Johnson	6 ft 0 in (1.83 m)	So	Rogers	Toledo, OH
F	15	Hailey Brown	6 ft 1 in (1.85 m)	Fr	The Rise Centre Academy	Hamilton, Ontario
G	20	Deja Church	5 ft 10 in (1.78 m)	Fr	Southfield A&T	Southfield, MI
F	21	Samantha Trammel	6 ft 1 in (1.85 m)	Jr	Eastview	Minnetonka, MN
F	22	Keasja Peace	6 ft 3 in (1.91 m)	So	Rogers	Toledo, OH
C	30	Hallie Thome	6 ft 5 in (1.96 m)	Jr	Chagrin Falls	Chagrin Falls, OH

Head coach

- Kim Barnes Arico (Montclair State)

Assistant coach(es)

- Melanie Moore (Siena)
- Joy McCorvey (St. John's)
- Wesley Brooks (West Virginia)

Legend

- (C) Team captain
- (S) Suspended
- (I) Ineligible
- (W) Walk-on
- Injured
- Current redshirt

Roster
Last update: Nov 27, 2017

== Schedule ==
Date time, TV	Rank^{#}	Opponent^{#}	Result	Record	Site (attendance) city, state
Exhibition
Nov 2, 2017*; 7:00 pm	No. 24	Grand Valley State	W 65–43	–	Crisler Center (674); Ann Arbor, MI
Non-conference regular season
Nov 10, 2017*; 7:00 pm	No. 24	George Mason; Preseason WNIT First Round	W 75–61	1–0	Crisler Center (3,442); Ann Arbor, MI
Nov 12, 2017*; 2:00 pm	No. 24	Liberty; Preseason WNIT Second Round	W 74–50	2–0	Crisler Center (2,138); Ann Arbor, MI
Nov 16, 2017*; 7:00 pm	No. 25	at No. 5 Louisville; Preseason WNIT Semifinals	L 49–74	2–1	KFC Yum! Center (5,651); Louisville, KY
Nov 22, 2017*; 7:00 pm	No. 25	Oakland	W 78–69	3–1	Crisler Center (2,679); Ann Arbor, MI
Nov 25, 2017*; 2:00 pm	No. 25	at Ohio	W 74–61	4–1	Convocation Center (436); Athens, OH
Nov 29, 2017*; 6:00 pm, BTN	No. 22	No. 3 Notre Dame; ACC–Big Ten Women's Challenge	L 63–83	4–2	Crisler Center (3,100); Ann Arbor, MI
Dec 2, 2017*; 12:00 pm	No. 22	at LIU Brooklyn	W 86–49	5–2	Steinberg Wellness Center (563); Brooklyn, NY
Dec 4, 2017*; 7:00 pm	No. 24	at Detroit	W 86–50	6–2	Calihan Hall (527); Detroit, MI
Dec 7, 2017*; 7:00 pm	No. 24	Marquette	W 82–76	7–2	Crisler Center (1,962); Ann Arbor, MI
Dec 10, 2017*; 2:00 pm	No. 24	Kent State	W 54–41	8–2	Crisler Center (2,164); Ann Arbor, MI
Dec 12, 2017*; 7:00 pm, BTN	No. 23	North Florida	W 79–34	9–2	Crisler Center (1,789); Ann Arbor, MI
Dec 16, 2017*; 2:00 pm	No. 23	Fort Wayne	W 77–45	10–2	Crisler Center (2,402); Ann Arbor, MI
Dec 21, 2017*; 3:30 pm	No. 23	Delaware State	W 105–36	11–2	Crisler Center (2,098); Ann Arbor, MI
Big Ten conference season
Dec 28, 2017; 6:00 pm, BTN	No. 21	Penn State	W 89–69	12–2 (1–0)	Crisler Center (4,907); Ann Arbor, MI
Dec 31, 2017; 4:00 pm, BTN	No. 21	at No. 23 Iowa	L 72–82	12–3 (1–1)	Carver–Hawkeye Arena (6,928); Iowa City, IA
Jan 4, 2018; 8:00 pm, BTN	No. 22	at Wisconsin	W 80–57	13–3 (2–1)	Kohl Center (2,978); Madison, WI
Jan 7, 2018; 12:00 pm, ESPN2	No. 22	No. 10 Ohio State; Rivalry	L 71–78 ^{OT}	13–4 (2–2)	Crisler Center (8,313); Ann Arbor, MI
Jan 10, 2018; 7:00 pm	No. 23	Indiana	W 84–79	14–4 (3–2)	Crisler Center (2,018); Ann Arbor, MI
Jan 13, 2018; 8:00 pm	No. 23	at Nebraska	W 69–64 ^{OT}	15–4 (4–2)	Pinnacle Bank Arena (4,279); Lincoln, NE
Jan 16, 2018; 7:00 pm, BTN	No. 19	at No. 8 Ohio State; Rivalry	W 84–75	16–4 (5–2)	Value City Arena (4,774); Columbus, OH
Jan 20, 2018; 6:00 pm, BTN	No. 19	Illinois	W 86–42	17–4 (6–2)	Crisler Center (3,265); Ann Arbor, MI
Jan 23, 2018; 7:00 pm, BTN	No. 16	Michigan State; Rivalry	W 74–48	18–4 (7–2)	Crisler Center (3,147); Ann Arbor, MI
Jan 28, 2018; 3:00 pm	No. 16	at Northwestern	W 80–59	19–4 (8–2)	Beardsley Gym (1,258); Evanston, IL
Feb 1, 2018; 8:00 pm, BTN	No. 13	Purdue	L 79–81 ^{OT}	19–5 (8–3)	Crisler Center (2,281); Ann Arbor, MI
Feb 4, 2018; 2:00 pm	No. 13	at Rutgers	L 56–63	19–6 (8–4)	Louis Brown Athletic Center (2,470); Piscataway, NJ
Feb 8, 2018; 7:00 pm	No. 21	Northwestern	W 84–63	20–6 (9–4)	Crisler Center (2,264); Ann Arbor, MI
Feb 11, 2018; 12:00 pm, ESPN2	No. 21	at Michigan State; Rivalry	L 61–66	20–7 (9–5)	Breslin Center (12,434); East Lansing, MI
Feb 14, 2018; 8:00 pm	No. 23	at Minnesota	L 87–93	20–8 (9–6)	Williams Arena (2,415); Minneapolis, MN
Feb 22, 2018; 6:00 pm		No. 13 Maryland	W 71–65	21–8 (10–6)	Crisler Center (2,964); Ann Arbor, MI
Big Ten Women's Tournament
Mar 1, 2018; 9:00 pm, RSN	(6)	vs. (11) Penn State; Second Round	W 77–48	22–8	Bankers Life Fieldhouse (3,813); Indianapolis, IN
Mar 2, 2018; 9:00 pm, RSN	(6)	vs. (3) Nebraska; Quarterfinals	L 54–61	22–9	Bankers Life Fieldhouse (5,538); Indianapolis, IN
NCAA Women's Tournament
Mar 16, 2018*; 5:00 pm, ESPN2	(7 L)	vs. (10 L) Northern Colorado; First Round	W 75–61	23–9	Ferrell Center; Waco, TX
Mar 18, 2018*; 8:30 pm, ESPN2	(7 L)	at (2 L) No. 2 Baylor; Second Round	L 58–80	23–10	Ferrell Center (4,114); Waco, TX
*Non-conference game. ^{#}Rankings from AP Poll. (#) Tournament seedings in parentheses. L=Lexington Region. All times are in Eastern Time.

== Rankings ==
Regular season polls
Poll	Pre- Season	Week 2	Week 3	Week 4	Week 5	Week 6	Week 7	Week 8	Week 9	Week 10	Week 11	Week 12	Week 13	Week 14	Week 15	Week 16	Week 17	Week 18	Week 19	Final
AP	24	24	25	22	24	23	23	21	22	23	19	16	13	21	23	RV	RV	RV	RV	N/A
Coaches	23	22	20	21	21	21	21	19	20	20	18	16	14	20	23	RV	24	RV	RV	RV

Legend
	Increase in ranking
	Decrease in ranking
	Not ranked previous week
(RV)	Received Votes

== See also ==
- 2017–18 Michigan Wolverines men's basketball team
