= 2017–18 Northwestern Wildcats women's basketball team =

Intercollegiate basketball season

2017–18 Northwestern Wildcats women's basketball
- Conference: Big Ten Conference
- Record: 12–20 (4–12 Big Ten)
- Head coach: Joe McKeown (10th season)
- Assistant coaches: Tasha Pointer; Tiffany Coppage; Christie Sides
- Home arena: Beardsley Gym (2017–18 only)

2017–18 Big Ten women's basketball standings
	Conf.				Overall
Team	W		L	PCT	W		L	PCT
No. 10 Ohio State †	13	–	3	.813	28	–	7	.800
No. 16 Maryland	12	–	4	.750	26	–	8	.765
Iowa	11	–	5	.688	24	–	8	.750
Minnesota	11	–	5	.688	24	–	9	.727
Nebraska	11	–	5	.688	21	–	11	.656
Michigan	10	–	6	.625	23	–	10	.697
Indiana	9	–	7	.563	23	–	14	.622
Purdue	9	–	7	.563	20	–	14	.588
Rutgers	7	–	9	.438	20	–	12	.625
Michigan State	7	–	9	.438	19	–	14	.576
Penn State	6	–	10	.375	16	–	16	.500
Northwestern	4	–	12	.250	12	–	20	.375
Wisconsin	2	–	14	.125	9	–	21	.300
Illinois	0	–	16	.000	9	–	21	.300
† 2018 Big Ten tournament winner Rankings from AP poll

The 2017–18 Northwestern Wildcats women's basketball team represented Northwestern University during the 2017–18 NCAA Division I women's basketball season. The Wildcats were led by 10th-year head coach Joe McKeown. They played 15 of their 16 home games, including an exhibition game, at Beardsley Gym on the nearby campus of Evanston Township High School, along with a home game at Allstate Arena while their home arena, Welsh-Ryan Arena, undergoes renovations. They were members of the Big Ten Conference. They finished the season 12–20, 4–12 in Big Ten play to finish in 11th place. They defeated Wisconsin in the first round of the Big Ten women's tournament before losing to Iowa.

== Previous season ==
The Wildcats finished the 2016–17 season 20–11, 8–8 in Big Ten play to finish in a tie for eighth place. They defeated Iowa in the second round of the Big Ten women's tournament before losing to Ohio State. Despite having 20 wins, they were not invited to a postseason tournament first time since 2013.

== Roster ==
2017–18 Northwestern Wildcats women's basketball team
Players
Coaches

Pos.	#	Name	Height	Year	Previous school	Hometown
G	2	Lauryn Satterwhite	5 ft 7 in (1.7 m)	Fr	Valley Vista	Avondale, AZ
F	4	Bryana Hopkins	6 ft 2 in (1.88 m)	So	William Fremd	Palatine, IL
G	10	Lindsey Pulliam	5 ft 10 in (1.78 m)	Fr	Our Lady of Good Counsel	Silver Spring, MD
G	11	Brooke Pikiell	5 ft 10 in (1.78 m)	Fr	Rutgers Prep	Far Hills, NJ
G	12	Lydia Rohde	5 ft 10 in (1.78 m)	Sr	Brookfield Central	Brookfield, WI
F	14	Pallas Kunaiyi-Akpannah	6 ft 2 in (1.88 m)	Jr	Rabun Gap-Nacoochee School	Abuja, Nigeria
F/C	21	Abbie Wolf	6 ft 4 in (1.93 m)	So	Greenwich	White Plains, NY
G	22	Byrdy Galernik	5 ft 8 in (1.73 m)	So	Toledo Central Catholic	Perrysburg, OH
G	24	Jordan Hamilton	5 ft 8 in (1.73 m)	Fr	Liberty	Frisco, TX
F	32	Amber Jamison	6 ft 0 in (1.83 m)	Jr	Rochester Adams	Rochester Hills, MI
C	34	Oceana Hamilton	6 ft 4 in (1.93 m)	RS Sr	St. Edmund Campion; Alabama	Mississauga, ON
F/C	44	Aby Scheid	6 ft 2 in (1.88 m)	So	Elk River	Elk River, MN

Head coach

- Joe McKeown (Mercer)

Assistant coach(es)

- Tiffany Coppage (Missouri State)
- Tasha Pointer (Rutgers)
- Christie Sides (Louisiana Tech)

Legend

- (C) Team captain
- (S) Suspended
- (I) Ineligible
- (W) Walk-on
- Injured
- Current redshirt

Roster
Last update: October 29, 2017

== Schedule and results ==
Date time, TV	Rank^{#}	Opponent^{#}	Result	Record	Site (attendance) city, state
Exhibition
Nov 05, 2017*; 2:00 pm		UMSL	W 59–40		Beardsley Gym (250); Evanston, IL
Non-conference regular season
Nov 10, 2017*; 7:00 pm		at Chicago State	W 63–36	1–0	Jones Convocation Center (250); Chicago, IL
Nov 16, 2017*; 7:00 pm		Oakland	W 88–70	2–0	Beardsley Gym (572); Evanston, IL
Nov 18, 2017*; 2:00 pm		at UT Martin	W 71–63	3–0	Skyhawk Arena (1,409); Martin, TN
Nov 22, 2017*; 1:00 pm		Santa Clara	W 57–47	4–0	Beardsley Gym (628); Evanston, IL
Nov 24, 2017*; 5:00 pm		vs. Chattanooga; Challenge in Music City	L 44–61	4–1	Nashville Municipal Auditorium (552); Nashville, TN
Nov 25, 2017*; 5:00 pm		vs. Auburn; Challenge in Music City	W 49–48	5–1	Nashville Municipal Auditorium (426); Nashville, TN
Nov 26, 2017*; 2:00 pm		vs. Georgetown; Challenge in Music City	L 54–55	5–2	Nashville Municipal Auditorium (217); Nashville, TN
Nov 30, 2017*; 6:00 pm		at Syracuse; ACC–Big Ten Women's Challenge	L 74–81	5-3	Carrier Dome (1,167); Syracuse, NY
Dec 03, 2017*; 2:00 pm		Milwaukee	L 57–66	5–4	Beardsley Gym (662); Evanston, IL
Dec 10, 2017*; 12:00 pm		Stony Brook	W 68–36	6–4	Beardsley Gym (654); Evanston, IL
Dec 13, 2017*; 7:00 pm		DePaul	L 63–92	6–5	Beardsley Gym (636); Evanston, IL
Dec 16, 2017*; 2:00 pm, ESPN3		at Missouri State	L 59–90	6–6	JQH Arena (2,121); Springfield, MO
Dec 19, 2017*; 11:00 am		No. 21 Green Bay	L 57–63	6–7	Allstate Arena (4,142); Rosemont, IL
Dec 22, 2017*; 4:00 pm		Eastern Illinois	W 74–40	7–7	Beardsley Gym (650); Evanston, IL
Big Ten regular season
Dec 28, 2017; 7:00 pm		Minnesota	L 63–90	7–8 (0–1)	Beardsley Gym (703); Evanston, IL
Dec 31, 2017; 2:00 pm		at Illinois	W 74–59	8–8 (1–1)	State Farm Center (1,412); Champaign, IL
Jan 03, 2018; 6:00 pm		at Michigan State	L 51–81	8–9 (1–2)	Breslin Center (6,079); East Lansing, MI
Jan 07, 2018; 2:00 pm		Nebraska	L 59–69	8–10 (1–3)	Beardsley Gym (850); Evanston, IL
Jan 11, 2018; 7:00 pm		Wisconsin	W 69–60	9–10 (2–3)	Beardsley Gym (652); Evanston, IL
Jan 18, 2018; 6:00 pm		at Purdue	L 60–63	9–11 (2–4)	Mackey Arena (5,795); West Lafayette, IN
Jan 21, 2018; 4:30 pm, BTN		at Wisconsin	L 48–56	9–12 (2–5)	Kohl Center (5,110); Madison, WI
Jan 25, 2018; 6:00 pm		No. 14 Maryland	L 65–68	9–13 (2–6)	Beardsley Gym (704); Evanston, IL
Jan 28, 2018; 2:00 pm		No. 16 Michigan	L 59–80	9–14 (2–7)	Beardsley Gym (1,258); Evanston, IL
Feb 04, 2018; 11:00 am, BTN		at Indiana	L 73–78	9–15 (2–8)	Simon Skjodt Assembly Hall (3,786); Bloomington, IN
Feb 08, 2018; 6:00 pm		at No. 21 Michigan	L 63–84	9–16 (2–9)	Crisler Center (2,264); Ann Arbor, MI
Feb 11, 2018; 2:00 pm		Iowa	L 61–70	9–17 (2–10)	Beardsley Gym (1,363); Evanston, IL
Feb 14, 2018; 6:00 pm		at Penn State	L 59–67	9–18 (2–11)	Bryce Jordan Center (2,409); University Park, PA
Feb 18, 2018; 2:00 pm		Illinois	W 68–61	10–18 (3–11)	Beardsley Gym (856); Evanston, IL
Feb 21, 2018; 6:00 pm		at No. 14 Ohio State	L 54–88	10–19 (3–12)	Value City Arena (4,774); Columbus, OH
Feb 25, 2018; 2:00 pm		Rutgers	W 63–50	11–19 (4–12)	Beardsley Gym (957); Evanston, IL
Big Ten Women's Tournament
Feb 28, 2018; 1:30 pm, RSN	(12)	vs. (13) Wisconsin; First Round	W 68–63	12–19	Bankers Life Fieldhouse; Indianapolis, IN
Mar 01, 2018; 1:30 pm, RSN	(12)	vs. (5) Iowa; Second Round	L 45–55	12–20	Bankers Life Fieldhouse; Indianapolis, IN
*Non-conference game. ^{#}Rankings from AP Poll. (#) Tournament seedings in parentheses. All times are in Central Time.

== Rankings ==
Regular season polls
Poll	Pre- Season	Week 2	Week 3	Week 4	Week 5	Week 6	Week 7	Week 8	Week 9	Week 10	Week 11	Week 12	Week 13	Week 14	Week 15	Week 16	Week 17	Week 18	Week 19	Final
AP																				
Coaches																				

Legend
	Increase in ranking
	Decrease in ranking
	Not ranked previous week
(RV)	Received Votes

== See also ==
2017–18 Northwestern Wildcats men's basketball team
