= 2017–18 Illinois Fighting Illini women's basketball team =

Intercollegiate basketball season

2017–18 Illinois Fighting Illini women's basketball
- Conference: Big Ten Conference
- Record: 9–22 (0–16 Big Ten)
- Head coach: Nancy Fahey (1st season)
- Assistant coaches: LaKale Malone; Tianna Kirkland; Steve Cochran
- Home arena: State Farm Center

2017–18 Big Ten women's basketball standings
	Conf.				Overall
Team	W		L	PCT	W		L	PCT
No. 10 Ohio State †	13	–	3	.813	28	–	7	.800
No. 16 Maryland	12	–	4	.750	26	–	8	.765
Iowa	11	–	5	.688	24	–	8	.750
Minnesota	11	–	5	.688	24	–	9	.727
Nebraska	11	–	5	.688	21	–	11	.656
Michigan	10	–	6	.625	23	–	10	.697
Indiana	9	–	7	.563	23	–	14	.622
Purdue	9	–	7	.563	20	–	14	.588
Rutgers	7	–	9	.438	20	–	12	.625
Michigan State	7	–	9	.438	19	–	14	.576
Penn State	6	–	10	.375	16	–	16	.500
Northwestern	4	–	12	.250	12	–	20	.375
Wisconsin	2	–	14	.125	9	–	21	.300
Illinois	0	–	16	.000	9	–	21	.300
† 2018 Big Ten tournament winner Rankings from AP poll

The 2017–18 Illinois Fighting Illini women's basketball team represented the University of Illinois during the 2017–18 NCAA Division I women's basketball season. The Fighting Illini, led by first-year head coach Nancy Fahey, played their home games at State Farm Center as members of the Big Ten Conference. They finished the season 9–21, 0–16 in Big Ten play to finish in last place. They lost in the first round of the Big Ten women's tournament to Penn State.

== Previous season ==
The Illini finished the 2016–17 season 9–22, 3–13 in Big Ten play to finish in a four-way tie for 11th place. They advanced to the second round of the Big Ten women's tournament where they lost to Purdue.

On March 14, 2017, head coach Matt Bollant was fired. He finished at Illinois with a five-year record of 61–94. On March 22, the school hired five-time Division III national champion and two-time Division III coach of the year recipient Nancy Fahey as head coach.

== Roster ==
2017–18 Illinois Fighting Illini women's basketball team
Players
Coaches

Pos.	#	Name	Height	Year	Previous school	Hometown
G	1	Brandi Beasley	5 ft 6 in (1.68 m)	So	Ridgeway	Memphis, TN
F	2	Lyric Robins	5 ft 11 in (1.8 m)	Fr	Plano West	Plano, TX
F	3	Alli Ball	6 ft 1 in (1.85 m)	Sr	Principia Upper; Akron	St. Louis, MO
G	5	Cierra Rice	5 ft 9 in (1.75 m)	RS So	Grosse Pointe South	Gross Pointe, MI
F	11	Cydnee Kinslow	6 ft 2 in (1.88 m)	RS So	Freedom; Pepperdine	Oakley, CA
G	13	Petra Holešínská	5 ft 9 in (1.75 m)	So	Sportovni Gzmnazium Ludvika Danka	Vracov, Czech Republic
G	14	Addaya Moore	5 ft 11 in (1.8 m)	Fr	Granite City	Granite City, IL
F	21	Nancy Panagiotopoulou Andritsopoulou	6 ft 3 in (1.91 m)	Fr	American Community Schools of Athens	Athens, Greece
G	23	Jaelyne Kirkpatrick	5 ft 7 in (1.7 m)	Jr	St. Ignatius of Loyola	Oakville, Ontario
F	24	Jnaya Walker	6 ft 1 in (1.85 m)	Fr	Bolingbrook	Bolingbrook, IL
G	25	Kennedy Cattenhead	5 ft 10 in (1.78 m)	RS Sr	Bolingbrook	Bolingbrook, IL
G	30	Courtney Joens	5 ft 10 in (1.78 m)	So	City High	Iowa City, IA
G	33	Meagan McNicholas	5 ft 10 in (1.78 m)	So	Rochester	Rochester, IL
F	35	Alex Wittinger	6 ft 1 in (1.85 m)	Jr	Delano	Delano, MN
F	50	Ali Andrews	6 ft 2 in (1.88 m)	So	Huntley	Lake in the Hills, IL

Head coach

- Nancy Fahey (Wisconsin)

Assistant coach(es)

- LaKale Malone (Indiana)
- Tianna Kirkland (Ferris State)
- Steve Cochran (Missouri–St. Louis)

Legend

- (C) Team captain
- (S) Suspended
- (I) Ineligible
- (W) Walk-on
- Injured
- Current redshirt

Roster
Last update: 11/26/2017

== Schedule and results ==
Date time, TV	Rank^{#}	Opponent^{#}	Result	Record	Site (attendance) city, state
Non-conference regular season
Nov 10, 2017*; 1:00 pm		Fort Wayne	W 64–50	1–0	State Farm Center (1,148); Champaign, IL
Nov 12, 2017*; 5:00 pm		at Florida Gulf Coast	L 61–85	1–1	Alico Arena (2,202); Fort Myers, FL
Nov 15, 2017*; 7:00 pm		Chicago State	W 66–56	2–1	State Farm Center (1,056); Champaign, IL
Nov 18, 2017*; 2:00 pm		Bradley	W 74–62	3–1	State Farm Center (1,135); Champaign, IL
Nov 21, 2017*; 7:00 pm		Western Illinois	L 67–77	3–2	State Farm Center (1,080); Champaign, IL
Nov 24, 2017*; 4:30 pm		vs. UC Irvine; New Mexico Thanksgiving Tournament	W 65–59	4–2	Dreamstyle Arena; Albuquerque, NM
Nov 25, 2017*; 1:00 pm		vs. Wichita State; New Mexico Thanksgiving Tournament	W 68–67	5–2	Dreamstyle Arena (4,425); Albuquerque, NM
Nov 26, 2017*; 3:30 pm		vs. New Mexico; New Mexico Thanksgiving Tournament	L 68–97	5–3	Dreamstyle Arena (4,663); Albuquerque, NM
Nov 30, 2017*; 7:00 pm		Virginia Tech; ACC–Big Ten Women's Challenge	L 49–96	5–4	State Farm Center (1,339); Champaign, IL
Dec 3, 2017*; 2:00 pm		at Memphis	W 63–47	6–4	Elma Roane Fieldhouse (553); Memphis, TN
Dec 7, 2017*; 7:00 pm		Indiana State	W 81–52	7–4	State Farm Center (1,044); Champaign, IL
Dec 12, 2017*; 2:00 pm		Detroit	W 73–65	8–4	State Farm Arena (1,151); Champaign, IL
Dec 16, 2017*; 2:00 pm		Austin Peay	W 59–47	9–4	State Farm Center (1,085); Champaign, IL
Dec 22, 2017*; 12:00 pm		at No. 16 Missouri	L 55–72	9–5	Mizzou Arena (4,630); Columbia, MO
Big Ten conference season
Dec 28, 2017; 5:00 pm		at No. 15 Maryland	L 65–100	9–6 (0–1)	Xfinity Center (7,346); College Park, MD
Dec 31, 2017; 2:00 pm		Northwestern	L 59–74	9–7 (0–2)	State Farm Center (1,412); Champaign, IL
Jan 3, 2018; 6:00 pm		at Rutgers	L 37–76	9–8 (0–3)	Louis Brown Athletic Center (1,289); Piscataway, NJ
Jan 7, 2018; 1:00 pm, BTN		No. 18 Iowa	L 71–84	9–9 (0–4)	State Farm Center (1,646); Champaign, IL
Jan 10, 2018; 7:00 pm		Nebraska	L 72–80	9–10 (0–5)	State Farm Center (1,039); Champaign, IL
Jan 16, 2018; 8:00 pm, BTN		Michigan State	L 55–67	9–11 (0–6)	State Farm Center (1,114); Champaign, IL
Jan 20, 2018; 5:00 pm, BTN		at No. 19 Michigan	L 42–86	9–12 (0–7)	Crisler Center (3,265); Ann Arbor, MI
Jan 23, 2018; 6:00 pm		at Penn State	L 59–68	9–13 (0–8)	Bryce Jordan Center (2,326); University Park, PA
Jan 28, 2018; 3:00 pm, BTN		Wisconsin	L 61–70	9–14 (0–9)	State Farm Center (3,237); Champaign, IL
Feb 1, 2018; 7:00 pm		at Nebraska	L 47–62	9–15 (0–10)	Pinnacle Bank Arena (4,618); Lincoln, NE
Feb 4, 2018; 1:00 pm, BTN		Purdue	L 54–73	9–16 (0–11)	State Farm Center (1,902); Champaign, IL
Feb 8, 2018; 6:00 pm		at Indiana	L 54–70	9–17 (0–12)	Simon Skjodt Assembly Hall (2,852); Bloomington, IN
Feb 13, 2018; 7:00 pm		No. 16 Ohio State	L 69–88	9–18 (0–13)	State Farm Center (1,149); Champaign, IL
Feb 18, 2018; 2:00 pm		at Northwestern	L 61–68	9–19 (0–14)	Beardsley Gym (856); Evanston, IL
Feb 21, 2018; 6:00 pm		at Purdue	L 51–64	9–20 (0–15)	Mackey Arena (5,655); West Lafayette, IN
Feb 25, 2018; 2:00 pm		Minnesota	L 75–84	9–21 (0–16)	State Farm Center (1,638); Champaign, IL
Big Ten Women's Tournament
Feb 28, 2018; 3:00 pm, RSN	(14)	vs. (11) Penn State; First Round	L 57–83	9–22	Bankers Life Fieldhouse (3,119); Indianapolis, IN
*Non-conference game. ^{#}Rankings from AP Poll. (#) Tournament seedings in parentheses. All times are in Central Time.

== Rankings ==
Regular season polls
Poll	Pre- Season	Week 2	Week 3	Week 4	Week 5	Week 6	Week 7	Week 8	Week 9	Week 10	Week 11	Week 12	Week 13	Week 14	Week 15	Week 16	Week 17	Week 18	Week 19	Final
AP																				N/A
Coaches																				

Legend
	Increase in ranking
	Decrease in ranking
	Not ranked previous week
(RV)	Received Votes

== See also ==
- 2017–18 Illinois Fighting Illini men's basketball team
