= 2017–18 Maryland Terrapins women's basketball team =

Intercollegiate basketball season

2017–18 Maryland Terrapins women's basketball
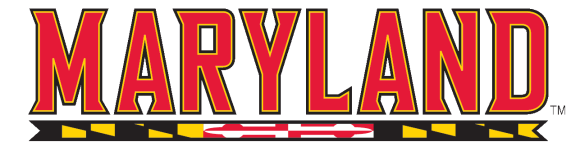

NCAA tournament, second round
- Conference: Big Ten Conference

Ranking
- Coaches: No. 18
- AP: No. 16
- Record: 26–8 (12–4 Big Ten)
- Head coach: Brenda Frese (16th season)
- Assistant coaches: Shay Robinson; Bett Shelby; Terry Nooner
- Home arena: Xfinity Center

2017–18 Big Ten women's basketball standings
	Conf.				Overall
Team	W		L	PCT	W		L	PCT
No. 10 Ohio State †	13	–	3	.813	28	–	7	.800
No. 16 Maryland	12	–	4	.750	26	–	8	.765
Iowa	11	–	5	.688	24	–	8	.750
Minnesota	11	–	5	.688	24	–	9	.727
Nebraska	11	–	5	.688	21	–	11	.656
Michigan	10	–	6	.625	23	–	10	.697
Indiana	9	–	7	.563	23	–	14	.622
Purdue	9	–	7	.563	20	–	14	.588
Rutgers	7	–	9	.438	20	–	12	.625
Michigan State	7	–	9	.438	19	–	14	.576
Penn State	6	–	10	.375	16	–	16	.500
Northwestern	4	–	12	.250	12	–	20	.375
Wisconsin	2	–	14	.125	9	–	21	.300
Illinois	0	–	16	.000	9	–	21	.300
† 2018 Big Ten tournament winner Rankings from AP poll

The 2017–18 Maryland Terrapins women's basketball team represented the University of Maryland, College Park in 2017–18 NCAA Division I women's basketball season. The Terrapins, led by sixteenth-year head coach Brenda Frese, played their home games at the Xfinity Center as members of the Big Ten Conference. They finished the season 26–8, 12–4 in Big Ten play to finish in second place. They defeated Indiana and Nebraska to advance to the championship of the Big Ten women's tournament, where they lost to Ohio State. They received an at-large bid to the NCAA women's basketball tournament as the No. 5 seed in the Kansas City region. There, they defeated Princeton before losing to NC State in the second round.

== Previous season ==
The Terrapins finished the 2017–18 season 32–3, 15–1 in Big Ten play to win, sharing the regular season title with Ohio State. They defeated Minnesota and Michigan State to advance to the championship of the Big Ten women's tournament, where they defeated Purdue to win the tournament championship for the third consecutive year. As a result, they received the conference's automatic bid to the NCAA women's basketball tournament as the No. 3 seed in the Bridgeport region. There, they defeated Bucknell and West Virginia to advance to the Sweet Sixteen before losing to Oregon.

== Roster ==
2017–18 Maryland Terrapins women's basketball team
Players
Coaches

Pos.	#	Name	Height	Year	Previous school	Hometown
F	0	Aja Ellison	6 ft 3 in (1.91 m)	RS Jr	Life Center Academy	Burlington, OH
G	1	Ieshia Small	6 ft 0 in (1.83 m)	RS Sr	Florida State Univ. HS; Baylor	Miami, FL
G	3	Channise Lewis	5 ft 8 in (1.73 m)	Fr	Miami Country Day	Miami, FL
G	5	Kaila Charles	6 ft 1 in (1.85 m)	So	Riverdale Baptist	Glenn Dale, MD
G/F	10	Eleanna Christinaki (redshirt)	6 ft 0 in (1.83 m)	Jr	Moraitis School; Florida	Athens, Greece
G	12	Kristen Confroy	5 ft 9 in (1.75 m)	Sr	Holly Springs	Solo, OH
G	21	Sarah Myers	5 ft 10 in (1.78 m)	So	West Forsyth	Cumming, GA
G	22	Blair Watson	6 ft 0 in (1.83 m)	So	Nutley	Nutley, NJ
F	24	Stephanie Jones	6 ft 2 in (1.88 m)	So	Aberdeen	Havre de Grace, MD
F	34	Brianna Fraser	6 ft 3 in (1.91 m)	Jr	South Shore	Brooklyn, NY

Head coach

- Brenda Frese (Arizona)

Assistant coach(es)

- Shay Robinson (Central Florida)
- Bett Shelby (Greensboro)
- Terry Nooner (Kansas)

Legend

- (C) Team captain
- (S) Suspended
- (I) Ineligible
- (W) Walk-on
- Injured
- Current redshirt

Roster
Last update: November 18, 2017

== Schedule and results ==
Date time, TV	Rank^{#}	Opponent^{#}	Result	Record	Site (attendance) city, state
Non-conference regular season
Nov 10, 2017*; 7:00 pm	No. 15	Albany	W 91–58	1–0	Xfinity Center (4,021); College Park, MD
Nov 13, 2017*; 7:00 pm, ESPN2	No. 15	No. 4 South Carolina	L 86–94	1–1	Xfinity Center (8,677); College Park, MD
Nov 16, 2017*; 11:00 am	No. 15	Niagara	W 92–65	2–1	Xfinity Center (9,425); College Park, MD
Nov 19, 2017*; 1:30 pm, ESPN	No. 15	at No. 1 Connecticut	L 72–97	2–2	XL Center (10,126); Hartford, CT
Nov 21, 2017*; 6:00 pm, BTN	No. 15	Howard	W 111–49	3–2	Xfinity Center (3,517); College Park, MD
Nov 24, 2017*; 2:00 pm	No. 15	vs. Kennesaw State; Miami Thanksgiving Tournament	W 89–35	4–2	Watsco Center (676); Coral Gables, FL
Nov 26, 2017*; 12:00 pm, ACCN Extra	No. 15	at Miami (FL); Miami Thanksgiving Tournament	W 79–71	5–2	Watsco Center (884); Coral Gables, FL
Nov 27, 2017*; 7:00 pm, ACCN Extra	No. 15	at Virginia; ACC–Big Ten Women's Challenge	W 60–59	6–2	John Paul Jones Arena (3,082); Charlottesville, VA
Dec 02, 2017*; 2:00 pm, ESPN3	No. 15	at Akron	W 75–54	7–2	James A. Rhodes Arena (656); Akron, OH
Dec 06, 2017*; 6:30 pm	No. 15	Mount St. Mary's	W 97–57	8–2	Xfinity Center (3,490); College Park, MD
Dec 08, 2017*; 7:00 pm	No. 15	George Washington	W 80–54	9–2	Xfinity Center (4,125); College Park, MD
Dec 11, 2017*; 6:00 pm, BTN	No. 15	Loyola (MD)	W 114–45	10–2	Xfinity Center (3,486); College Park, MD
Dec 20, 2017*; 2:00 pm	No. 15	at Coppin State	W 113–49	11–2	Physical Education Complex (630); Baltimore, MD
Big Ten regular season
Dec 28, 2017; 6:00 pm	No. 15	Illinois	W 100–65	12–2 (1–0)	Xfinity Center (7,346); College Park, MD
Dec 31, 2017; 2:00 pm, BTN	No. 15	at Penn State	W 69–65	13–2 (2–0)	Bryce Jordan Center (2,612); University Park, PA
Jan 04, 2018; 6:00 pm, BTN	No. 13	No. 18 Iowa	W 80–64	14–2 (3–0)	Xfinity Center (3,841); College Park, MD
Jan 07, 2018; 3:00 pm	No. 13	at Wisconsin	W 71–44	15–2 (4–0)	Kohl Center (3,882); Madison, WI
Jan 11, 2018; 8:00 pm, BTN	No. 11	Michigan State	L 68–82	15–3 (4-1)	Xfinity Center (4,052); College Park, MD
Jan 16, 2018; 7:00 pm	No. 14	Indiana	W 74–70	16–3 (5–1)	Xfinity Center (3,947); College Park, MD
Jan 22, 2018; 7:00 pm, ESPN2	No. 14	No. 12 Ohio State	W 99–69	17–3 (6–1)	Xfinity Center (7,944); College Park, MD
Jan 25, 2018; 8:00 pm	No. 14	at Northwestern	W 68–65	18–3 (7–1)	Beardsley Gym (704); Evanston, IL
Feb 01, 2018; 7:00 pm	No. 11	Rutgers	W 88–60	19–3 (8–1)	Xfinity Center (4,427); College Park, MD
Feb 04, 2018; 3:00 pm	No. 11	at Nebraska	W 64–57	20–3 (9–1)	Pinnacle Bank Arena (6,185); Lincoln, NE
Feb 08, 2018; 7:00 pm, BTN	No. 10	at Michigan State	W 76–68	21–3 (10–1)	Breslin Center (4,988); East Lansing, MI
Feb 11, 2018; 12:00 pm, BTN	No. 10	at Rutgers	W 72–54	22–3 (11–1)	Louis Brown Athletic Center (3,545); Piscataway, NJ
Feb 15, 2018; 6:00 pm, BTN	No. 10	Purdue	L 65–75	22–4 (11–2)	Xfinity Center (4,521); College Park, MD
Feb 18, 2018; 1:00 pm, BTN	No. 10	at Minnesota	L 74–93	22–5 (11–3)	Williams Arena (4,625); Minneapolis, MN
Feb 22, 2018; 6:00 pm, BTN	No. 13	at Michigan	L 65–71	22–6 (11–4)	Crisler Center (2,964); Ann Arbor, MI
Feb 25, 2018; 12:00 pm, BTN	No. 13	Nebraska	W 77–75	23–6 (12–4)	Xfinity Center (10,239); College Park, MD
Big Ten Women's Tournament
Mar 02, 2018; 6:30 pm, RSN	(2) No. 17	vs. (7) Indiana; Quarterfinals	W 67–54	24–6	Bankers Life Fieldhouse; Indianapolis, IN
Mar 03, 2018; 7:30 pm, BTN	(2) No. 17	vs. (3) Nebraska; Semifinals	W 66–53	25–6	Bankers Life Fieldhouse (7,499); Indianapolis, IN
Mar 04, 2018; 7:00 pm, ESPN2	(2) No. 17	vs. (1) No. 13 Ohio State; Championship Game	L 69–79	25–7	Bankers Life Fieldhouse (4,519); Indianapolis, IN
NCAA Women's Tournament
Mar 16, 2018*; Noon, ESPN2	(5 KC) No. 16	vs. (12 KC) Princeton; First Round	W 77–57	26–7	Reynolds Coliseum (2,522); Raleigh, NC
Mar 18, 2018*; 2:00 pm, ESPN2	(5 KC) No. 16	at (4 KC) No. 21 NC State; Second Round	L 60–74	26–8	Reynolds Coliseum (2,711); Raleigh, NC
*Non-conference game. ^{#}Rankings from AP Poll. (#) Tournament seedings in parentheses. KC=Kansas City Region. All times are in Eastern Time.

== Rankings ==
Regular season polls
Poll	Pre- season	Week 2	Week 3	Week 4	Week 5	Week 6	Week 7	Week 8	Week 9	Week 10	Week 11	Week 12	Week 13	Week 14	Week 15	Week 16	Week 17	Week 18	Week 19	Final
AP	15	15	15	15	15	15	15	15	13	11	14	14	11	10	10	13	17	17	16	N/A
Coaches	13	15	15	15	15	15	14	15	13	11	14	13	10	9	9	13	17	16	16	18

Legend
	Increase in ranking
	Decrease in ranking
	No change
(RV)	Received votes
(NR)	Not ranked

== See also ==
- 2017–18 Maryland Terrapins men's basketball team
