= 2017–18 Nebraska Cornhuskers women's basketball team =

Intercollegiate basketball season

2017–18 Nebraska Cornhuskers women's basketball

NCAA women's tournament, first round
- Conference: Big Ten Conference
- Record: 21–11 (11–5 Big Ten)
- Head coach: Amy Williams (2nd season)
- Assistant coaches: Tom Goehle; Chuck Love; Tandem Mays
- Home arena: Pinnacle Bank Arena

2017–18 Big Ten women's basketball standings
	Conf.				Overall
Team	W		L	PCT	W		L	PCT
No. 10 Ohio State †	13	–	3	.813	28	–	7	.800
No. 16 Maryland	12	–	4	.750	26	–	8	.765
Iowa	11	–	5	.688	24	–	8	.750
Minnesota	11	–	5	.688	24	–	9	.727
Nebraska	11	–	5	.688	21	–	11	.656
Michigan	10	–	6	.625	23	–	10	.697
Indiana	9	–	7	.563	23	–	14	.622
Purdue	9	–	7	.563	20	–	14	.588
Rutgers	7	–	9	.438	20	–	12	.625
Michigan State	7	–	9	.438	19	–	14	.576
Penn State	6	–	10	.375	16	–	16	.500
Northwestern	4	–	12	.250	12	–	20	.375
Wisconsin	2	–	14	.125	9	–	21	.300
Illinois	0	–	16	.000	9	–	21	.300
† 2018 Big Ten tournament winner Rankings from AP poll

The 2017–18 Nebraska Cornhuskers women's basketball team represented the University of Nebraska during the 2017–18 NCAA Division I women's basketball season. The Cornhuskers, led by second-year head coach Amy Williams, played their home games at Pinnacle Bank Arena in Lincoln, Nebraska and were a member of the Big Ten Conference. They finished the season 21–11, 11–5 in Big Ten play, to finish in a three-way for third place. They advanced to the semifinals of the Big Ten women's tournament where they lost to Maryland. They received an at-large bid to the 2018 Division I women's tournament where they lost to Arizona State in the first round.

== Roster ==
2017–18 Nebraska Cornhuskers women's basketball team
Players
Coaches

Pos.	#	Name	Height	Year	Previous school	Hometown
G	3	Hannah Whitish	5 ft 9 in (1.75 m)	So	Barneveld	Barneveld, WI
G	5	Nicea Eliely	6 ft 1 in (1.85 m)	So	Rampart	Colorado Springs, CO
G	12	Emily Wood	5 ft 5 in (1.65 m)	Sr	Salina Central	Salina, KS
G	13	Janay Morton	5 ft 10 in (1.78 m)	RS Sr	Osseo; Eastern Michigan	Brooklyn Park, MN
G/F	14	Grace Mitchell	6 ft 2 in (1.88 m)	So	Wellington	Wellington, KS
G	15	Bria Stallworth	5 ft 6 in (1.68 m)	So	Homewood-Flossmoor; UMass	Chicago, IL
G	24	Maddie Simon	6 ft 2 in (1.88 m)	Jr	Pius X	Lincoln, NE
C	31	Kate Cain	6 ft 5 in (1.96 m)	Fr	Pine Bush	Middletown, NY
F	32	Jessica Shepard	6 ft 4 in (1.93 m)	Jr	Fremont	Fremont, NE
G/F	33	Taylor Kissinger	6 ft 1 in (1.85 m)	Fr	Minden	Minden, NE
G	34	Jasmine Cincore	5 ft 8 in (1.73 m)	Sr	Briarcrest Christian School	Arlington, TN
F	43	Rachel Blackburn	6 ft 3 in (1.91 m)	So	Leavenworth	Leavenworth, KS
C	50	Darrien Washington	6 ft 2 in (1.88 m)	RS Jr	Skyline	Oakland, CA

Head coach

- Amy Williams (Nebraska)

Assistant coach(es)

- Tom Goehle (Augustana (SD))
- Chuck Love (Northwestern Oklahoma State)
- Tandem Mays (Tulsa)

Legend

- (C) Team captain
- (S) Suspended
- (I) Ineligible
- (W) Walk-on
- Injured
- Current redshirt

Roster
Last update: October 6, 2024

== Schedule ==
Date time, TV	Rank^{#}	Opponent^{#}	Result	Record	Site (attendance) city, state
Exhibition
November 5, 2017*; 2:00 p.m., BTN+		Minnesota State	W 88–55	–	Pinnacle Bank Arena (3,647); Lincoln, NE
Non-conference regular season
November 11, 2017*; 3:00 p.m., BTN+		Southern Illinois	W 62–53	1–0	Pinnacle Bank Arena (3,523); Lincoln, NE
November 14, 2017*; 7:00 p.m., BTN+		UMKC	W 80–60	2–0	Pinnacle Bank Arena (3,503); Lincoln, NE
November 16, 2017*; 8:00 p.m., BTN		Arkansas	W 80–69	3–0	Pinnacle Bank Arena (3,459); Lincoln, NE
November 19, 2017*; 7:00 p.m., BTN+		Creighton	L 49–64	3–1	Pinnacle Bank Arena (4,324); Lincoln, NE
November 23, 2017*; 3:15 p.m., NET		vs. Buffalo; San Juan Shootout	L 72–82	3–2	Ocean Center (200); Daytona Beach, FL
November 24, 2017*; 1:00 p.m., NET		vs. Coastal Carolina; San Juan Shootout	W 55–47	4–2	Ocean Center (175); Daytona Beach, FL
November 30, 2017*; 2:00 p.m., BTN+		Clemson; ACC–Big Ten Women's Challenge	L 66–67	4–3	Pinnacle Bank Arena (3,579); Lincoln, NE
December 2, 2017*; 2:00 p.m., BTN+		Arkansas–Pine Bluff	W 73–52	5–3	Pinnacle Bank Arena (3,781); Lincoln, NE
December 6, 2017*; 7:00 p.m., ESPN3		at Kansas	W 66–49	6–3	Allen Fieldhouse; Lawrence, KS
December 9, 2017*; 2:00 p.m., ESPN3		at Drake	W 89–84 ^{2OT}	7–3	Knapp Center (2,683); Des Moines, IA
December 17, 2017*; 2:00 p.m., MWN		at San Jose State	W 81–55	8–3	Event Center Arena (1,424); San Jose, CA
December 19, 2017*; 7:00 p.m., BTN+		Florida Atlantic	W 86–69	9–3	Pinnacle Bank Arena (3,635); Lincoln, NE
December 22, 2017*; 1:00 p.m., BTN+		Washington State	L 61–73	9–4	Pinnacle Bank Arena (4,404); Lincoln, NE
Big Ten Conference season
December 28, 2017; 7:00 p.m., BTN		Ohio State	L 61–73	9–5 (0–1)	Pinnacle Bank Arena (4,383); Lincoln, NE
December 31, 2017; 2:00 p.m., BTN+		at Minnesota	W 79–74	10–5 (1–1)	Williams Arena (3,284); Minneapolis, MN
January 7, 2018; 2:00 p.m., BTN+		at Northwestern	W 69–59	11–5 (2–1)	Beardsley Gym (850); Evanston, IL
January 10, 2018; 7:00 p.m., BTN+		at Illinois	W 80–72	12–5 (3–1)	State Farm Center (1,039); Champaign, IL
January 13, 2018; 7:00 p.m., BTN+		No. 23 Michigan	L 64–69 ^{OT}	12–6 (3–2)	Pinnacle Bank Arena (4,279); Lincoln, NE
January 16, 2018; 7:00 p.m., BTN+		No. 20 Iowa	W 74–65	13–6 (4–2)	Pinnacle Bank Arena (3,667); Lincoln, NE
January 21, 2018; 5:00 p.m., BTN		at No. 25 Rutgers	W 52–42	14–6 (5–2)	Louis Brown Athletic Center (1,887); Piscataway, NJ
January 24, 2018; 7:00 p.m., BTN+		Purdue	W 75–51	15–6 (6–2)	Pinnacle Bank Arena (4,167); Lincoln, NE
January 28, 2018; 2:00 p.m., BTN+		at Iowa	W 92–74	16–6 (7–2)	Carver–Hawkeye Arena (8,823); Iowa City, IA
February 1, 2018; 7:00 p.m., BTN+		Illinois	W 62–47	17–6 (8–2)	Pinnacle Bank Arena (4,618); Lincoln, NE
February 4, 2018; 2:00 p.m., BTN+		No. 11 Maryland	L 57–64	17–7 (8–3)	Pinnacle Bank Arena (6,185); Lincoln, NE
February 11, 2018; 2:00 p.m., BTN+		Wisconsin	W 51–48	18–7 (9–3)	Pinnacle Bank Arena (6,823); Lincoln, NE
February 14, 2018; 6:00 p.m., BTN+		at Michigan State	W 79–69	19–7 (10–3)	Breslin Center (4,972); East Lansing, MI
February 17, 2018; 11:00 a.m., BTN		at Indiana	L 75–83	19–8 (10–4)	Simon Skjodt Assembly Hall (5,258); Bloomington, IN
February 22, 2018; 7:00 p.m., BTN		Penn State	W 59–51	20–8 (11–4)	Pinnacle Bank Arena (5,757); Lincoln, NE
February 25, 2018; 11:00 a.m., BTN		at No. 13 Maryland	L 75–77	20–9 (11–5)	Xfinity Center (10,239); College Park, MD
Big Ten women's tournament
March 2, 2018; 8:00 p.m., RSN	(3)	vs. (6) Michigan; Quarterfinals	W 61–54	21–9	Bankers Life Fieldhouse (5,538); Indianapolis, IN
March 3, 2018; 7:30 p.m., BTN	(3)	vs. (2) No. 17 Maryland; Semifinals	L 53–66	21–10	Bankers Life Fieldhouse (7,499); Indianapolis, IN
NCAA women's tournament
March 17, 2018*; 2:30 p.m., ESPN2	(10 KC)	vs. (7 KC) Arizona State; First round	L 62–73	21–11	Frank Erwin Center (3,878); Austin, TX
*Non-conference game. ^{#}Rankings from AP poll. (#) Tournament seedings in parentheses. KC=Kansas City Region. All times are in Central.

== Rankings ==
Regular-season polls
Poll	Pre- season	Week 2	Week 3	Week 4	Week 5	Week 6	Week 7	Week 8	Week 9	Week 10	Week 11	Week 12	Week 13	Week 14	Week 15	Week 16	Week 17	Week 18	Week 19	Final
AP	NR	NR	NR	NR	NR	NR	NR	NR	NR	NR	NR	NR	RV	RV	RV	RV	NR	NR	NR	N/A
Coaches	NR	N/A	NR	NR	NR	NR	NR	NR	NR	NR	NR	NR	RV	NR	RV	NR	NR	RV	NR	NR

Legend
	Increase in ranking
	Decrease in ranking
	Not ranked previous week
(RV)	Received votes

== See also ==
- 2017–18 Nebraska Cornhuskers men's basketball team
