= 2017–18 Wisconsin Badgers women's basketball team =

Intercollegiate basketball season

2017–18 Wisconsin Badgers women's basketball
- Conference: Big Ten Conference
- Record: 9–21 (2–14 Big Ten)
- Head coach: Jonathan Tsipis (2nd season)
- Assistant coaches: Sasha Palmer; Craig Carter; Myia McCurdy-Johnson
- Home arena: Kohl Center

2017–18 Big Ten women's basketball standings
| | Conf. | | | | Overall |
| Team | W | | L | PCT | W | | L | PCT |
|---|---|---|---|---|---|---|---|---|
| No. 10 Ohio State † | 13 | – | 3 | .813 | 28 | – | 7 | .800 |
| No. 16 Maryland | 12 | – | 4 | .750 | 26 | – | 8 | .765 |
| Iowa | 11 | – | 5 | .688 | 24 | – | 8 | .750 |
| Minnesota | 11 | – | 5 | .688 | 24 | – | 9 | .727 |
| Nebraska | 11 | – | 5 | .688 | 21 | – | 11 | .656 |
| Michigan | 10 | – | 6 | .625 | 23 | – | 10 | .697 |
| Indiana | 9 | – | 7 | .563 | 23 | – | 14 | .622 |
| Purdue | 9 | – | 7 | .563 | 20 | – | 14 | .588 |
| Rutgers | 7 | – | 9 | .438 | 20 | – | 12 | .625 |
| Michigan State | 7 | – | 9 | .438 | 19 | – | 14 | .576 |
| Penn State | 6 | – | 10 | .375 | 16 | – | 16 | .500 |
| Northwestern | 4 | – | 12 | .250 | 12 | – | 20 | .375 |
| Wisconsin | 2 | – | 14 | .125 | 9 | – | 21 | .300 |
| Illinois | 0 | – | 16 | .000 | 9 | – | 21 | .300 |
† 2018 Big Ten tournament winner Rankings from AP poll

The 2017–18 Wisconsin Badgers women's basketball team represented the University of Wisconsin–Madison during the 2017–18 NCAA Division I women's basketball season. The Badgers, led by second-year head coach Jonathan Tsipis, played their home games at the Kohl Center as members of the Big Ten Conference. They finished the season 9–21, 2–14 in Big Ten play to finish in 13th place. They lost in the first round of the Big Ten women's tournament to Northwestern.

== Previous season ==
The Badgers finished the 2016–17 season 9–22, 3–13 in Big Ten play to finish in a four-way for 11th place. They defeated Rutgers in the first round of the Big Ten women's tournament before losing to Michigan State.

== Roster ==
2017–18 Wisconsin Badgers women's basketball team
Players
Coaches

| Pos. | # | Name | Height | Year | Previous school | Hometown |
|---|---|---|---|---|---|---|
| F | 2 | Kelly Karlis | 6 ft 2 in (1.88 m) | Sr | Montini Catholic; Ohio | Medinah, IL |
| G | 3 | Suzanne Gilreath | 5 ft 4 in (1.63 m) | So | Fridley | Brooklyn Park, MN |
| G | 5 | Roichelle Marble | 5 ft 7 in (1.7 m) | RS Jr | East | Des Moines, IA |
| G | 10 | Kendra Van Leeuwen | 5 ft 10 in (1.78 m) | So | St. John's College (ON) | Brantford, ON |
| F | 11 | Marsha Howard | 5 ft 10 in (1.78 m) | Jr | Crete Monee | Chicago, IL |
| F | 14 | Abby Laszewski | 6 ft 3 in (1.91 m) | So | Avon | Hartford, CT |
| G | 15 | Lexy Richardson | 5 ft 9 in (1.75 m) | RS Jr | Verona Area | Verona, WI |
| G | 20 | Lizzie Miller | 5 ft 7 in (1.7 m) | Fr | De Pere | De Pere, WI |
| G | 22 | Niya Beverley | 5 ft 7 in (1.7 m) | Fr | St. John's College (DC) | Laurel, MD |
| G | 23 | Cayla McMorris | 6 ft 0 in (1.83 m) | Sr | Park Center | Brooklyn Park, MN |
| F/C | 24 | Malayna Johnson | 6 ft 4 in (1.93 m) | RS Jr | Montini Catholic | Bellwood, IL |
| G | 30 | Kara Crowley | 5 ft 10 in (1.78 m) | Fr | Beaver Dam | Beaver Dam, WI |
| F | 33 | Courtney Fredrickson | 6 ft 2 in (1.88 m) | So | Minnetonka | Excelsior, MN |
| F/C | 35 | Kendall Shaw | 6 ft 4 in (1.93 m) | GS | Barbers Hill; Vanderbilt | Mont Belvieu, TX |
| F | 43 | Grace Mueller | 6 ft 2 in (1.88 m) | RS Fr | Verona Area | Madison, WI |

Head coach

- Jonathan Tsipis (North Carolina)

Assistant coach(es)

- Sasha Palmer (Northern Michigan)
- Craig Carter (Rutgers)
- Myia McCurdy-Johnson (Rutgers)

Legend

- (C) Team captain
- (S) Suspended
- (I) Ineligible
- (W) Walk-on
- Injured
- Current redshirt

Roster
Last update: October 9, 2017

== Schedule and results ==
| Date time, TV | Rank^{#} | Opponent^{#} | Result | Record | Site (attendance) city, state |
Exhibition
| Nov 08, 2017*; 7:00 pm | | UW–Platteville | W 107–58 | – | Kohl Center; Madison, WI |
Non-conference regular season
| Nov 12, 2017*; 11:00 am | | Charlotte | W 80–66 | 1–0 | Kohl Center (3,235); Madison, WI |
| Nov 15, 2017*; 7:00 pm | | Green Bay | L 34–67 | 1–1 | Kohl Center (3,495); Madison, WI |
| Nov 20, 2017*; 7:00 pm | | Southern | W 77–74 | 2–1 | Kohl Center (2,808); Madison, WI |
| Nov 23, 2017*; 10:00 am | | vs. Syracuse; Paradise Jam Tournament Reef Division | L 74–77 | 2–2 | Charles E. Smith Center; Washington, D.C. |
| Nov 24, 2017*; 12:00 pm | | vs. George Washington; Paradise Jam Tournament Reef Division | L 46–61 | 2–3 | Charles E. Smith Center; Washington, D.C. |
| Nov 25, 2017*; 10:00 am | | vs. Vanderbilt; Paradise Jam Tournament Reef Division | W 73–71 ^{OT} | 3–3 | Charles E. Smith Center; Washington, D.C. |
| Nov 29, 2017*; 2:30 pm | | at Pittsburgh; ACC–Big Ten Women's Challenge | W 58–57 | 4–3 | Petersen Events Center (762); Pittsburgh, PA |
| Dec 02, 2017*; 11:00 am | | La Salle | W 71–60 | 5–3 | Kohl Center (3,771); Madison, WI |
| Dec 04, 2017*; 7:00 pm | | at Marquette | L 65–88 | 5–4 | Al McGuire Center (1,629); Milwaukee, WI |
| Dec 06, 2017*; 7:00 pm | | Texas–Rio Grande Valley | W 82–54 | 6–4 | Kohl Center (2,809); Madison, WI |
| Dec 08, 2017*; 7:00 pm | | at Butler | L 62–69 | 6–5 | Hinkle Fieldhouse (869); Indianapolis, IN |
| Dec 10, 2017*; 2:00 pm | | Savannah State | W 82–24 | 7–5 | Kohl Center (3,344); Madison, WI |
| Dec 14, 2017*; 7:00 pm | | Milwaukee | L 64–67 | 7–6 | Kohl Center (3,233); Madison, WI |
Big Ten regular season
| Dec 28, 2017; 7:00 pm | | No. 23 Iowa | L 46–56 | 7–7 (0–1) | Kohl Center (3,865); Madison, WI |
| Dec 31, 2017; 1:00 pm | | at Purdue | L 35–57 | 7–8 (0–2) | Mackey Arena (6,218); West Lafayette, IN |
| Jan 04, 2018; 7:00 pm, BTN | | No. 22 Michigan | L 57–80 | 7–9 (0–3) | Kohl Center (2,978); Madison, WI |
| Jan 07, 2018; 2:00 pm | | No. 13 Maryland | L 44–71 | 7–10 (0–4) | Kohl Center (3,882); Madison, WI |
| Jan 11, 2018; 7:00 pm | | at Northwestern | L 60–69 | 7–11 (0–5) | Beardsley Gym (652); Evanston, IL |
| Jan 14, 2018; 1:00 pm, BTN | | Penn State | L 62–69 | 7–12 (0–6) | Kohl Center (3,729); Madison, WI |
| Jan 18, 2018; 7:00 pm | | at Minnesota | L 65–90 | 7–13 (0–7) | Williams Arena (3,588); Minneapolis, MN |
| Jan 21, 2018; 4:30 pm, BTN | | Northwestern | W 56–48 | 8–13 (1–7) | Kohl Center (5,110); Madison, WI |
| Jan 24, 2018; 6:00 pm | | at Indiana | L 55–69 | 8–14 (1–8) | Simon Skjodt Assembly Hall (2,574); Bloomington, IN |
| Jan 28, 2018; 3:00 pm, BTN | | at Illinois | W 70–61 | 9–14 (2–8) | State Farm Center (3,237); Champaign, IL |
| Jan 31, 2018; 7:00 pm | | Minnesota | L 61–71 | 9–15 (2–9) | Kohl Center (3,583); Madison, WI |
| Feb 03, 2018; 12:00 pm, BTN | | No. 18 Ohio State | L 55–68 | 9–16 (2–10) | Kohl Center (6,623); Madison, WI |
| Feb 11, 2018; 2:00 pm | | at Nebraska | L 48–51 | 9–17 (2–11) | Pinnacle Bank Arena (6,823); Lincoln, NE |
| Feb 14, 2018; 7:00 pm | | Rutgers | L 50–63 | 9–18 (2–12) | Kohl Center (3,073); Madison, WI |
| Feb 18, 2018; 7:00 pm | | at Iowa | L 61–88 | 9–19 (2–13) | Carver–Hawkeye Arena (7,495); Iowa City, IA |
| Feb 21, 2018; 6:00 pm | | at Michigan State | L 61–69 | 9–20 (2–14) | Breslin Center (5,355); East Lansing, MI |
Big Ten Conference Women's Tournament
| Feb 28, 2018; 1:30 pm, RSN | (13) | vs. (12) Northwestern; First Round | L 63–68 | 9–21 | Bankers Life Fieldhouse; Indianapolis, IN |
*Non-conference game. ^{#}Rankings from AP Poll. (#) Tournament seedings in parentheses. All times are in Central Time.

== See also ==
2017–18 Wisconsin Badgers men's basketball team
