= 2017–18 Ohio State Buckeyes women's basketball team =

Intercollegiate basketball season

2017–18 Ohio State Buckeyes women's basketball

Big Ten tournament champions Big Ten regular season champions Play4Kay Showcase champions

NCAA tournament, second round
- Conference: Big Ten Conference

Ranking
- Coaches: No. 15
- AP: No. 10
- Record: 28–7 (13–3 Big Ten)
- Head coach: Kevin McGuff (5th season)
- Assistant coaches: Patrick Klein; Mark Mitchell; Carrie Banks
- Home arena: Value City Arena

2017–18 Big Ten women's basketball standings
	Conf.				Overall
Team	W		L	PCT	W		L	PCT
No. 10 Ohio State †	13	–	3	.813	28	–	7	.800
No. 16 Maryland	12	–	4	.750	26	–	8	.765
Iowa	11	–	5	.688	24	–	8	.750
Minnesota	11	–	5	.688	24	–	9	.727
Nebraska	11	–	5	.688	21	–	11	.656
Michigan	10	–	6	.625	23	–	10	.697
Indiana	9	–	7	.563	23	–	14	.622
Purdue	9	–	7	.563	20	–	14	.588
Rutgers	7	–	9	.438	20	–	12	.625
Michigan State	7	–	9	.438	19	–	14	.576
Penn State	6	–	10	.375	16	–	16	.500
Northwestern	4	–	12	.250	12	–	20	.375
Wisconsin	2	–	14	.125	9	–	21	.300
Illinois	0	–	16	.000	9	–	21	.300
† 2018 Big Ten tournament winner Rankings from AP poll

The 2017–18 Ohio State Buckeyes women's basketball team represented the Ohio State University during the 2017–18 NCAA Division I women's basketball season. The Buckeyes, led by 5th-year head coach Kevin McGuff, played their home games at Value City Arena and were a member of the Big Ten Conference. They finished the season 28–7, 13–3 in Big Ten play to win the regular season title. They defeated Rutgers, Minnesota, and Maryland to win the Big Ten women's basketball tournament. As a result, they received the conference's automatic bid to the NCAA women's tournament as the No. 3 seed in the Spokane region. There, they defeated George Washington in the first round before being upset by No. 11-seeded Central Michigan in the second round.

== Previous season ==
The Buckeyes finished the 2016–17 season 28–7, 15–1 in Big Ten play to win a share of the Big Ten regular season title with Maryland. They defeated Northwestern in the quarterfinals of the Big Ten women's basketball tournament before losing to Purdue. They received an at-large bid to the NCAA women's tournament as the No. 5 seed in the Lexington region. There, they defeated Western Kentucky and Kentucky to advance to the Sweet Sixteen. In the Sweet Sixteen, they lost to Notre Dame.

== Roster ==
2017–18 Ohio State Buckeyes women's basketball team
Players
Coaches

Pos.	#	Name	Height	Year	Previous school	Hometown
F	1	Stephanie Mavunga	6 ft 3 in (1.91 m)	RS Sr	Brownsburg; North Carolina	Brownsburg, IN
G	3	Kelsey Mitchell	5 ft 8 in (1.73 m)	Sr	Princeton	Cincinnati, OH
G	4	Sierra Calhoun	6 ft 0 in (1.83 m)	RS Jr	Christ the King; Duke	Brooklyn, NY
F	5	Chelsea Mitchell	5 ft 11 in (1.8 m)	RS Jr	Princeton	Cincinnati, OH
F	12	Savita Jayaraman	6 ft 2 in (1.88 m)	Fr	Olentangy Liberty	Powell, OH
G	14	Karlie Cronin	5 ft 8 in (1.73 m)	So	Oakton	Oakton, VA
G	15	Linnae Harper	5 ft 8 in (1.73 m)	RS Sr	Whitney Young; Kentucky	Chicago, IL
G	20	Asia Doss	5 ft 7 in (1.7 m)	Sr	Country Day School	Detroit, MI
F	22	Alexa Hart	6 ft 3 in (1.91 m)	Sr	Africentric	Columbus, OH
F	24	Makayla Waterman	6 ft 2 in (1.88 m)	RS Jr	Fairmont	Kettering, OH
G	33	Jensen Caretti	6 ft 1 in (1.85 m)	Fr	River	Clarington, OH

Head coach

- Kevin McGuff (Saint Joseph's (IN))

Assistant coach(es)

- Patrick Klein (Ohio State)
- Mark Mitchell (Eastern Kentucky)
- Carrie Banks (Detroit Mercy)

Legend

- (C) Team captain
- (S) Suspended
- (I) Ineligible
- (W) Walk-on
- Injured
- Current redshirt

Roster
Last update: Nov 28, 2017

== Schedule and results ==
Date time, TV	Rank^{#}	Opponent^{#}	Result	Record	Site (attendance) city, state
Exhibition
Oct 29, 2017*; 2:00 pm	No. 5	Ashland	W 110–80		Value City Arena (4,750); Columbus, OH
Nov 05, 2017*; 1:00 pm	No. 5	Urbana	W 135–54		Value City Arena (4,190); Columbus, OH
Regular season
Nov 10, 2017*; 2:00 pm, BTN	No. 5	No. 10 Stanford	W 85–64	1–0	St. John Arena (5,854); Columbus, OH
Nov 12, 2017*; 4:00 pm, ESPNU	No. 5	vs. No. 9 Louisville; Countdown to Columbus	L 90–95 ^{OT}	1–1	Nationwide Arena (9,711); Columbus, OH
Nov 15, 2017*; 7:00 pm	No. 9	Idaho	W 99–56	2–1	Value City Arena (3,960); Columbus, OH
Nov 17, 2017*; 7:00 pm	No. 9	Quinnipiac	W 95–63	3-1	Value City Arena (3,793); Columbus, OH
Nov 19, 2017*; 11:00 am	No. 9	Washington	W 85–76	4–1	Value City Arena (4,335); Columbus, OH
Nov 23, 2017*; 6:00 pm	No. 9	vs. Memphis; Play4Kay Showcase Quarterfinals	W 100–69	5–1	Mandalay Bay Arena (N/A); Las Vegas, NV
Nov 24, 2017*; 8:30 pm	No. 9	vs. Florida Gulf Coast; Play4Kay Showcase Semifinals	W 104–62	6–1	Mandalay Bay Arena (N/A); Las Vegas, NV
Nov 25, 2017*; 11:00 pm	No. 9	vs. No. 14 Stanford; Play4Kay Showcase Championship	W 94–83 ^{OT}	7–1	Mandalay Bay Arena (N/A); Las Vegas, NV
Nov 30, 2017*; 1:00 pm, ESPN2	No. 8	at No. 14 Duke; ACC–Big Ten Women's Challenge	L 60–69	7–2	Cameron Indoor Stadium (5,535); Durham, NC
Dec 03, 2017*; 1:00 pm	No. 8	Maine	W 83–70	8–2	Value City Arena (5,879); Columbus, OH
Dec 06, 2017*; 5:30 pm	No. 12	at Florida	W 103–77	9–2	O'Connell Center (1,512); Gainesville, FL
Dec 15, 2017*; 7:00 pm	No. 13	Dartmouth	W 103–70	10–2	Value City Arena (5,086); Columbus, OH
Dec 17, 2017*; 4:00 pm, ESPN2	No. 13	at Cincinnati	W 87–76	11–2	Saint Ursula Academy Gym (1,072); Cincinnati, OH
Dec 28, 2017; 8:00 pm, BTN	No. 12	at Nebraska	W 73–61	12–2 (1–0)	Pinnacle Bank Arena (4,383); Lincoln, NE
Dec 31, 2017; 2:00 pm, ESPN2	No. 12	Indiana	W 85–70	13–2 (2–0)	Value City Arena (6,364); Columbus, OH
Jan 04, 2018; 7:00 pm	No. 10	Minnesota	W 91–75	14–2 (3–0)	Value City Arena (4,519); Columbus, OH
Jan 07, 2018; 12:00 pm, ESPN2	No. 10	at No. 22 Michigan; Rivalry	W 78–71 ^{OT}	15–2 (4–0)	Crisler Center (8,313); Ann Arbor, MI
Jan 13, 2018; 12:00 pm, BTN	No. 10	at Indiana	W 77–62	16–2 (5–0)	Simon Skjodt Assembly Hall (2,983); Bloomington, IN
Jan 16, 2018; 7:00 pm, BTN	No. 8	No. 19 Michigan; Rivalry	L 75–84	16–3 (5–1)	Value City Arena (4,774); Columbus, OH
Jan 22, 2018; 7:00 pm, ESPN2	No. 12	at No. 14 Maryland	L 69–99	16–4 (5–2)	Xfinity Center (7,944); College Park, MD
Jan 25, 2018; 8:00 pm	No. 12	at Iowa	L 89–103	16–5 (5–3)	Carver-Hawkeye Arena (6,012); Iowa City, IA
Jan 27, 2018; 12:00 pm, ESPNU	No. 12	Michigan State	W 78–62	17–5 (6–3)	Value City Arena (6,850); Columbus, OH
Jan 31, 2018; 7:00 pm	No. 18	Penn State	W 94–64	18–5 (7–3)	Value City Arena (5,449); Columbus, OH
Feb 02, 2018; 1:00 pm, BTN	No. 18	at Wisconsin	W 68–55	19–5 (8–3)	Kohl Center (6,623); Madison, WI
Feb 08, 2018; 7:00 pm	No. 13	Rutgers	W 90–68	20–5 (9–3)	Value City Arena (4,505); Columbus, OH
Feb 11, 2018*; 2:00 pm, ESPN2	No. 13	at South Florida	L 65–84	20–6	USF Sun Dome (2,852); Tampa, FL
Feb 13, 2018; 8:00 pm	No. 16	at Illinois	W 88–69	21–6 (10–3)	State Farm Center (1,149); Champaign, IL
Feb 18, 2018; 1:00 pm, ESPN2	No. 16	Purdue	W 73–60	22–6 (11–3)	Value City Arena (8,081); Columbus, OH
Feb 21, 2018; 7:00 pm	No. 14	Northwestern	W 88–54	23–6 (12–3)	Value City Arena (4,774); Columbus, OH
Feb 25, 2018; 12:00 pm, ESPN2	No. 14	Penn State	W 89–64	24–6 (13–3)	Bryce Jordan Center (7,517); University Park, PA
Big Ten Women's Tournament
Mar 02, 2018; 12:00 pm, RSN	(1) No. 13	vs. (9) Rutgers; Quarterfinals	W 82–57	25–6	Bankers Life Fieldhouse; Indianapolis, IN
Mar 03, 2018; 6:00 pm, BTN	(1) No. 13	vs. (4) Minnesota; Semifinals	W 90–88	26–6	Bankers Life Fieldhouse; Indianapolis, IN
Mar 04, 2018; 7:00 pm, ESPN2	(1) No. 13	vs. (2) No. 17 Maryland; Championship Game	W 79–69	27–6	Bankers Life Fieldhouse (4,519); Indianapolis, IN
NCAA Women's Tournament
Mar 17, 2018*; 1:30 pm, ESPN2	(3 S) No. 10	(14 S) George Washington; First Round	W 87–45	28–6	St. John Arena (4,253); Columbus, OH
Mar 19, 2018*; 6:30 pm, ESPN2	(3 S) No. 10	(11 S) Central Michigan; Second Round	L 78–95	28–7	St. John Arena (3,571); Columbus, OH
*Non-conference game. ^{#}Rankings from AP Poll. (#) Tournament seedings in parentheses. S=Spokane Region. All times are in Eastern Time.

== Rankings ==
Regular season polls
Poll	Pre- season	Week 2	Week 3	Week 4	Week 5	Week 6	Week 7	Week 8	Week 9	Week 10	Week 11	Week 12	Week 13	Week 14	Week 15	Week 16	Week 17	Week 18	Week 19	Final
AP	5	9	9	8	12	13	12	12	10	10	8	12	18	13	16	14	13	10	10	N/A
Coaches	8	8	8	12	13	13	11	11	10	10	8	14	17	13	17	15	14	10	10	15

Legend
	Increase in ranking
	Decrease in ranking
	Not ranked previous week
(RV)	Received votes

== See also ==
- 2017–18 Ohio State Buckeyes men's basketball team
