= 2017–18 Rutgers Scarlet Knights women's basketball team =

Intercollegiate basketball season

2017–18 Rutgers Scarlet Knights women's basketball
- Conference: Big Ten Conference
- Record: 20–12 (7–9 Big Ten)
- Head coach: C. Vivian Stringer (23rd season)
- Assistant coaches: Timothy Eatman; Kelley Gibson; Nadine Domond
- Home arena: Louis Brown Athletic Center

2017–18 Big Ten women's basketball standings
	Conf.				Overall
Team	W		L	PCT	W		L	PCT
No. 10 Ohio State †	13	–	3	.813	28	–	7	.800
No. 16 Maryland	12	–	4	.750	26	–	8	.765
Iowa	11	–	5	.688	24	–	8	.750
Minnesota	11	–	5	.688	24	–	9	.727
Nebraska	11	–	5	.688	21	–	11	.656
Michigan	10	–	6	.625	23	–	10	.697
Indiana	9	–	7	.563	23	–	14	.622
Purdue	9	–	7	.563	20	–	14	.588
Rutgers	7	–	9	.438	20	–	12	.625
Michigan State	7	–	9	.438	19	–	14	.576
Penn State	6	–	10	.375	16	–	16	.500
Northwestern	4	–	12	.250	12	–	20	.375
Wisconsin	2	–	14	.125	9	–	21	.300
Illinois	0	–	16	.000	9	–	21	.300
† 2018 Big Ten tournament winner Rankings from AP poll

The 2017–18 Rutgers Scarlet Knights women's basketball team represented Rutgers University during the 2017–18 NCAA Division I women's basketball season. The Scarlet Knights, led by 23rd year head coach C. Vivian Stringer, played their home games at the Louis Brown Athletic Center, better known as The RAC, as a member of the Big Ten Conference.

Despite improving on the dismal 2016–17 season and finishing with a 20–12 record, the Scarlet Knights weren't selected to participate in the 2018 NCAA tournament. They were then offered an at-large berth in the WNIT, but Coach Stringer declined, stating the team needed to "focus on the future" in order to "control our destiny" next season.

== Roster ==
2017–18 Rutgers Scarlet Knights women's basketball team
Players
Coaches

Pos.	#	Name	Height	Year	Previous school	Hometown
G	1	Jazlynd Rollins	5 ft 7 in (1.7 m)	Sr	Buchholz; Daytona State	Gainesville, FL
G	3	Tyler Scaife	5 ft 9 in (1.75 m)	RS Sr	Hall	Little Rock, AR
G	4	Kate Hill	5 ft 7 in (1.7 m)	RS Fr	Peddie	Toronto, ON
G	5	Ciani Cryor	5 ft 5 in (1.65 m)	RS So	Neumann-Goretti; Georgia Tech	Philadelphia, PA
G	10	Kathleen Fitzpatrick	5 ft 9 in (1.75 m)	RS Sr	Academy of Notre Dame de Namur; Saint Joseph's	Drexel Hill, PA
G	11	Nigia Greene	5 ft 10 in (1.78 m)	Sr	St. Francis; Miami	Atlanta, GA
G	12	Khadaizha Sanders	5 ft 7 in (1.7 m)	Jr	Bishop McNamara	Kankakee, IL
F	13	Mael Gilles	6 ft 1 in (1.85 m)	Fr	Montmorency	Montréal-Nord, QC
F	15	Caitlin Jenkins	6 ft 3 in (1.91 m)	Jr	Huntington; Southern Miss; Southern	Shreveport, LA
G	24	Arella Guirantes	5 ft 11 in (1.8 m)	So	Bellport; Texas Tech	Bellport, NY
G/F	31	Tekia Mack	6 ft 1 in (1.85 m)	Fr	Marshall	Chicago, IL
F/C	32	Desiree Keeling	6 ft 2 in (1.88 m)	Jr	William Fleming	Roanoke, VA
F	35	Stasha Carey	6 ft 2 in (1.88 m)	RS Jr	Berea-Midpark; Pittsburgh	Cleveland, OH
F/C	40	Victoria Harris	6 ft 3 in (1.91 m)	Jr	Parkview	Snellville, GA
C	44	Jordan Wallace	6 ft 3 in (1.91 m)	So	Sterling	Somerdale, NJ

Head coach

- C. Vivian Stringer (Slippery Rock)

Assistant coach(es)

- Tim Eatman (Talladega)
- Kelley Gibson (Maryland)
- Nadine Domond (Iowa)

Legend

- (C) Team captain
- (S) Suspended
- (I) Ineligible
- (W) Walk-on
- Injured
- Current redshirt

Roster
Last update: Nov 28, 2017

== Schedule ==
Date time, TV	Rank^{#}	Opponent^{#}	Result	Record	Site (attendance) city, state
Non-conference regular season
Nov 10, 2017*; 7:30 pm		at James Madison	W 76–63	1–0	JMU Convocation Center (4,598); Harrisonburg, VA
Nov 13, 2017*; 7:00 pm, ESPN3		at Temple	W 84–67	2–0	McGonigle Hall (1,158); Philadelphia, PA
Nov 16, 2017*; 7:00 pm		at Charlotte	W 77–54	3–0	Dale F. Halton Arena (872); Charlotte, NC
Nov 19, 2017*; 6:30 pm		Wake Forest	W 65–51	4–0	Louis Brown Athletic Center (1,535); Piscataway, NJ
Nov 24, 2017*; 1:30 pm		vs. No. 3 South Carolina; Gulf Coast Showcase Quarterfinals	L 68–78	4–1	Germain Arena (1,207); Fort Myers, FL
Nov 25, 2017*; 11:00 am		vs. Western Michigan; Gulf Coast Showcase Consolation 2nd round	W 75–64	5–1	Germain Arena (1,100); Fort Myers, FL
Nov 26, 2017*; 1:30 pm		vs. Washington State; Gulf Coast Showcase 5th Place Game	L 60–63	5–2	Germain Arena (N/A); Fort Myers, FL
Nov 30, 2017*; 6:00 pm, BTN		NC State; ACC–Big Ten Women's Challenge	W 57–53	6–2	Louis Brown Athletic Center (1,215); Piscataway, NJ
Dec 2, 2017*; 2:00 pm		Siena	W 59–47	7–2	Louis Brown Athletic Center (2,139); Piscataway, NJ
Dec 4, 2017*; 6:00 pm, BTN		Virginia	W 52–43	8–2	Louis Brown Athletic Center (1,368); Piscataway, NJ
Dec 8, 2017*; 2:00 pm		Seton Hall	W 70–45	9–2	Louis Brown Athletic Center (1,235); Piscataway, NJ
Dec 10, 2017*; 2:00 pm		Fairleigh Dickinson	W 101–35	10–2	Louis Brown Athletic Center (1,508); Piscataway, NJ
Dec 13, 2017*; 6:00 pm, BTN		Princeton; Rivalry	W 70–50	11–2	Louis Brown Athletic Center (1,247); Piscataway, NJ
Dec 16, 2017*; 6:00 pm		Houston	W 75–57	12–2	Louis Brown Athletic Center (1,220); Piscataway, NJ
Big Ten conference season
Dec 28, 2017; 2:00 pm		Purdue	W 58–50	13–2 (1–0)	Louis Brown Athletic Center (1,827); Piscataway, NJ
Dec 31, 2017; 4:00 pm		at Michigan State	W 61–58	14–2 (2–0)	Breslin Center (6,251); East Lansing, MI
Jan 3, 2018; 7:00 pm		Illinois	W 76–37	15–2 (3–0)	Louis Brown Athletic Center (1,289); Piscataway, NJ
Jan 6, 2018; 4:30 pm, BTN		Penn State	W 70–65	16–2 (4–0)	Louis Brown Athletic Center (2,246); Piscataway, NJ
Jan 10, 2018; 7:00 pm	No. 21	at Purdue	L 33–47	16–3 (4–1)	Mackey Arena (5,774); West Lafayette, IN
Jan 13, 2018; 2:00 pm, BTN	No. 21	Minnesota	W 80–70 ^{OT}	17–3 (5–1)	Louis Brown Athletic Center (2,168); Piscataway, NJ
Jan 18, 2018; 7:00 pm	No. 25	at Penn State	L 67–70	17–4 (5–2)	Bryce Jordan Center (2,531); University Park, PA
Jan 21, 2018; 6:00 pm	No. 25	Nebraska	L 42–52	17–5 (5–3)	Louis Brown Athletic Center (1,887); Piscataway, NJ
Jan 27, 2018; 1:00 pm		at Indiana	L 58–64	17–6 (5–4)	Simon Skjodt Assembly Hall (3,340); Bloomington, IN
Feb 1, 2018; 7:00 pm		at No. 11 Maryland	L 60–88	17–7 (5–5)	Xfinity Center (4,427); College Park, MD
Feb 4, 2018; 2:00 pm		No. 13 Michigan	W 63–56	18–7 (6–5)	Louis Brown Athletic Center (2,470); Piscataway, NJ
Feb 8, 2018; 7:00 pm		at No. 13 Ohio State	L 68–90	18–8 (6–6)	Value City Arena (4,505); Columbus, OH
Feb 11, 2018; 12:00 pm, BTN		No. 10 Maryland	L 54–72	18–9 (6–7)	Louis Brown Athletic Center (3,545); Piscataway, NJ
Feb 14, 2018; 8:00 pm		at Wisconsin	W 63–50	19–9 (7–7)	Kohl Center (3,073); Madison, WI
Feb 21, 2018; 7:00 pm		Iowa	L 67–77 ^{OT}	19–10 (7–8)	Louis Brown Athletic Center (1,852); Piscataway, NJ
Feb 25, 2018; 3:00 pm		at Northwestern	L 50–63	19–11 (7–9)	Beardsley Gym (957); Evanston, IL
Big Ten Women's Tournament
Mar 1, 2018; 12:00 pm, RSN	(9)	vs. (8) Purdue; Second Round	W 62–60	20–11	Bankers Life Fieldhouse; Indianapolis, IN
Mar 2, 2018; 12:00 pm, RSN	(9)	vs. (1) No. 13 Ohio State; Quarterfinals	L 57–82	20–12	Bankers Life Fieldhouse; Indianapolis, IN
*Non-conference game. ^{#}Rankings from AP Poll. (#) Tournament seedings in parentheses. All times are in Eastern Time.

== Rankings ==
Regular season polls
Poll	Pre- Season	Week 2	Week 3	Week 4	Week 5	Week 6	Week 7	Week 8	Week 9	Week 10	Week 11	Week 12	Week 13	Week 14	Week 15	Week 16	Week 17	Week 18	Week 19	Final
AP	NR	NR	NR	NR	NR	NR	NR	NR	RV	21	25	RV	NR	RV	NR	NR	NR	NR		N/A
Coaches	NR	RV	NR	NR	NR	NR	NR	25	19	19	21	RV	NR	RV	NR	NR	NR	NR		

Legend
	Increase in ranking
	Decrease in ranking
	Not ranked previous week
(RV)	Received Votes

== See also ==
2017–18 Rutgers Scarlet Knights men's basketball team
