= 2018 Big Ten women's basketball tournament =

- Classification: Division I
- Season: 2017–18
- Teams: 14
- Site: Bankers Life Fieldhouse; Indianapolis, IN
- Champions: Ohio State (6th title)
- Winning coach: Kevin McGuff (1st title)
- MVP: Kelsey Mitchell (Ohio State)
- Attendance: 33,209
- Television: Big Ten Network, RSN, ESPN2

2017–18 Big Ten women's basketball standings
	Conf.				Overall
Team	W		L	PCT	W		L	PCT
No. 10 Ohio State †	13	–	3	.813	28	–	7	.800
No. 16 Maryland	12	–	4	.750	26	–	8	.765
Iowa	11	–	5	.688	24	–	8	.750
Minnesota	11	–	5	.688	24	–	9	.727
Nebraska	11	–	5	.688	21	–	11	.656
Michigan	10	–	6	.625	23	–	10	.697
Indiana	9	–	7	.563	23	–	14	.622
Purdue	9	–	7	.563	20	–	14	.588
Rutgers	7	–	9	.438	20	–	12	.625
Michigan State	7	–	9	.438	19	–	14	.576
Penn State	6	–	10	.375	16	–	16	.500
Northwestern	4	–	12	.250	12	–	20	.375
Wisconsin	2	–	14	.125	9	–	21	.300
Illinois	0	–	16	.000	9	–	21	.300
† 2018 Big Ten tournament winner Rankings from AP poll

The 2018 Big Ten women's basketball tournament was the postseason women's basketball tournament for the Big Ten Conference during the 2017–18 NCAA Division I women's basketball season. It was held from February 28 through March 4, 2018 at Bankers Life Fieldhouse in Indianapolis. Ohio State defeated Maryland 79–69 in the championship game to win the tournament, and received the Big Ten's automatic bid to the 2018 NCAA tournament.

== Seeds ==
All 14 Big Ten schools participated in the tournament. Teams were seeded by 2017–18 Big Ten Conference season record. The top 10 teams received a first-round bye and the top 4 teams received a double bye.

Seeding for the tournament was determined at the close of the regular conference season:

Seed	School	Conf	Tiebreak 1	Tiebreak 2
1	Ohio State	13–3		
2	Maryland	12–4		
3	Nebraska	11–5	2–0 vs Iowa	
4	Minnesota	11–5	1–1 vs. NEB	1–0 vs. MD
5	Iowa	11–5	1–1 vs. NEB	0–1 vs. MD
6	Michigan	10–6		
7	Indiana	9–7	2–0 vs. PUR	
8	Purdue	9–7	0–2 vs. IND	
9	Rutgers	7–9	1–0 vs. MSU	
10	Michigan State	7–9	0–1 vs. RU	
11	Penn State	6–10		
12	Northwestern	3–13		
13	Wisconsin	2–14		
14	Illinois	0–16		

== Schedule ==
Session	Game	Time*	Matchup^{#}	Television	Attendance	Score
First Round – Wednesday, February 28
1	1	1:30 pm	#13 Wisconsin vs. #12 Northwestern	RSN	3,119	63–68
1	2	4:00 pm	#14 Illinois vs. #11 Penn State	RSN	3,119	57–83
Second Round – Thursday, March 1
2	3	12:00 pm	#9 Rutgers vs. #8 Purdue	RSN	3,447	62–60
2	4	2:30 pm	#12 Northwestern vs. #5 Iowa	RSN	3,447	45–55
3	5	6:30 pm	#10 Michigan State vs. #7 Indiana	RSN	3,813	109–111^{4OT}
3	6	9:00 pm	#11 Penn State vs. #6 Michigan	RSN	3,813	48–77
Quarterfinals – Friday, March 2
4	7	12:00 pm	#9 Rutgers vs. #1 Ohio State	RSN	5,274	82–57
4	8	2:30 pm	#5 Iowa vs. #4 Minnesota	RSN	5,274	89–90
5	9	6:30 pm	#7 Indiana vs. #2 Maryland	RSN	5,538	54–67
5	10	9:00 pm	#6 Michigan vs. #3 Nebraska	RSN	5,538	54–61
Semifinals – Saturday, March 3
6	11	6:00 pm	#1 Ohio State vs. #4 Minnesota	BTN	7,499	90–88
6	12	8:30 pm	#2 Maryland vs. #3 Nebraska	BTN	7,499	66–53
Championship – Sunday, March 4
7	13	7:00 pm	#1 Ohio State vs. #2 Maryland	ESPN2	4,519	79–69

*Game times in Eastern Time. #Rankings denote tournament seeding.

== Bracket ==
- All times are Eastern.

First round Wednesday, February 28; RSN/BTN2Go; 1:30 pm 3:55 pm
13	Northwestern	68
12	Wisconsin	63
14	Illinois	57
11	Penn State	83

Second round Thursday, March 1 RSN/BTN2Go; 12 pm 2:25 pm 6:30 pm 8:55 pm
9	Rutgers	62
8	Purdue	60
13	Northwestern	45
5	Iowa	55
10	Michigan State	109
7	Indiana	111^{4OT}
11	Penn State	48
6	Michigan	77

Quarterfinals; Friday, March 2 RSN/BTN2Go; 12 pm 2:25 pm 6:30 pm 8:55 pm
9	Rutgers	57
1	Ohio State	82
5	Iowa	89
4	Minnesota	90
7	Indiana	54
2	Maryland	67
6	Michigan	54
3	Nebraska	61

Semifinals; Saturday, March 3 BTN; 6 pm 8:25 pm
1	Ohio State	90
4	Minnesota	88
2	Maryland	66
3	Nebraska	53

Championship; Sunday, March 4 ESPN2; 7 pm
1	Ohio State	79
2	Maryland	69

== See also ==
- 2018 Big Ten Conference men's basketball tournament
