= 2017–18 Minnesota Golden Gophers women's basketball team =

Intercollegiate basketball season

2017–18 Minnesota Golden Gophers women's basketball

Lady Rebel Round-Up Champions

NCAA Women's Tournament, second round
- Conference: Big Ten Conference
- Record: 24–9 (11–5 Big Ten)
- Head coach: Marlene Stollings (4th season)
- Assistant coaches: Nikita Lowry Dawkins; Marty McGillan; Gail Striegler
- Home arena: Williams Arena

2017–18 Big Ten women's basketball standings
	Conf.				Overall
Team	W		L	PCT	W		L	PCT
No. 10 Ohio State †	13	–	3	.813	28	–	7	.800
No. 16 Maryland	12	–	4	.750	26	–	8	.765
Iowa	11	–	5	.688	24	–	8	.750
Minnesota	11	–	5	.688	24	–	9	.727
Nebraska	11	–	5	.688	21	–	11	.656
Michigan	10	–	6	.625	23	–	10	.697
Indiana	9	–	7	.563	23	–	14	.622
Purdue	9	–	7	.563	20	–	14	.588
Rutgers	7	–	9	.438	20	–	12	.625
Michigan State	7	–	9	.438	19	–	14	.576
Penn State	6	–	10	.375	16	–	16	.500
Northwestern	4	–	12	.250	12	–	20	.375
Wisconsin	2	–	14	.125	9	–	21	.300
Illinois	0	–	16	.000	9	–	21	.300
† 2018 Big Ten tournament winner Rankings from AP poll

The 2017–18 Minnesota Golden Gophers women's basketball team represented the University of Minnesota during the 2017–18 NCAA Division I women's basketball season. The Golden Gophers, led by fourth-year head coach Marlene Stollings, played their home games at Williams Arena as members of the Big Ten Conference. They finished the season 24–9, 11–5 in Big Ten play to finish in a three-way tie for third place. They defeated Iowa in the quarterfinals of the Big Ten women's tournament before losing to Ohio State in the semifinals. They received an at-large bid to the NCAA women's tournament as the No. 7 seed in the Spokane region. There they defeated Green Bay before losing to Oregon in the second round.

On April 9, 2018, head coach Marlene Stollings resigned from Minnesota to accept the head coaching job at Texas Tech. She finished with a four-year record of 82–47. On April 12, the school hired the second all-time leading scorer for the Gophers, Lindsay Whalen, as head coach. As part of her contract with the school, Whalen will continue to play for the WNBA's Minnesota Lynx while she is head coach.

== Roster ==
2017–18 Minnesota Golden Gophers women's basketball team
Players
Coaches

Pos.	#	Name	Height	Year	Previous school	Hometown
G/F	3	Destiny Pitts	5 ft 10 in (1.78 m)	Fr	Detroit Country Day	Detroit, MI
F	5	Taiye Bello	6 ft 2 in (1.88 m)	So	Southfield-Lathrup	Southfield, MI
C	10	Jessie Edwards	6 ft 3 in (1.91 m)	Sr	Western Australia	Leeming, Australia
C	14	Bryanna Fernstrom	6 ft 5 in (1.96 m)	Sr	Chisago Lakes; Iowa State	Center City, MN
F	20	Kehinde Bello	6 ft 2 in (1.88 m)	So	Southfield-Lathrup	Southfield, MI
G	21	Jasmine Brunson	5 ft 8 in (1.73 m)	So	Mary Louis Academy	Queens, NY
G	23	Kenisha Bell	5 ft 9 in (1.75 m)	RS Jr	Kennedy HS; Marquettte	Minneapolis, MN
F	25	Palma Kaposi	6 ft 2 in (1.88 m)	Jr	None	Pécs, Hungary
F	31	Irene Garrido Perez	6 ft 1 in (1.85 m)	Jr	Wyoming CC	Granada, Spain
G	33	Carlie Wagner	5 ft 10 in (1.78 m)	Sr	NRHEG HS	New Richland, MN
G	34	Gadiva Hubbard	5 ft 9 in (1.75 m)	So	Princess Anne High School	Virginia Beach, VA
C	41	Annalese Lamke	6 ft 3 in (1.91 m)	Jr	Gale-Ettrick-Trempealeau HS	Milwaukee, WI
G	43	Paloma Gonzalez	5 ft 7 in (1.7 m)	Fr	Colegio Leones	Vigo, Spain

Head coach

- Marlene Stollings (Ohio)

Assistant coach(es)

- Nikita Lowry Dawkins (Ohio State)
- Marty McGillan (UNC Wilmington)
- Gail Striegler (Central Arkansas)

Legend

- (C) Team captain
- (S) Suspended
- (I) Ineligible
- (W) Walk-on
- Injured
- Current redshirt

Roster
Last update: Nov 27, 2017

== Schedule and results ==
Date time, TV	Rank^{#}	Opponent^{#}	Result	Record	Site (attendance) city, state
Non-conference regular season
Nov 11, 2017*; 5:00 pm		Lehigh	W 107–73	1–0	Williams Arena (2,642); Minneapolis, MN
Nov 13, 2017*; 6:00 pm		at Rhode Island	W 82–60	2–0	Ryan Center (310); Kingston, RI
Nov 16, 2017*; 7:00 pm		VCU	W 108–63	3–0	Williams Arena (2,147); Minneapolis, MN
Nov 19, 2017*; 7:00 pm		Boston College	W 78–68	4–0	Williams Arena (2,454); Minneapolis, MN
Nov 22, 2017*; 8:00 pm, BTN		Xavier	W 74–62	5–0	Williams Arena (2,000); Minneapolis, MN
Nov 25, 2017*; 4:30 pm		vs. Wake Forest; Lady Rebel Round-Up semifinals	W 93–81	6–0	Cox Pavilion (583); Paradise, NV
Nov 26, 2017*; 4:30 pm		at UNLV; Lady Rebel Round-Up championship	W 79–72	7–0	Cox Pavilion (575); Paradise, NV
Nov 29, 2017*; 2:30 pm, ACCN Extra		at North Carolina; ACC–Big Ten Women's Challenge	L 83–88	7–1	Carmichael Arena (2,315); Chapel Hill, NC
Dec 3, 2017*; 1:00 pm		Eastern Michigan	W 80–56	8–1	Williams Arena (2,694); Minneapolis, MN
Dec 7, 2017*; 6:00 pm		at Georgetown	W 73–63	9–1	McDonough Gymnasium (307); Washington, D.C.
Dec 10, 2017*; 2:30 pm		at San Diego	L 69–72	9–2	Jenny Craig Pavilion (511); San Diego, CA
Dec 13, 2017*; 12:00 pm		Cal Poly	W 112–68	10–2	Williams Arena (4,126); Minneapolis, MN
Dec 22, 2017*; 1:00 pm		UC Riverside	W 101–75	11–2	Williams Arena (2,106); Minneapolis, MN
Big Ten conference season
Dec 28, 2017; 7:00 pm		at Northwestern	W 90–63	12–2 (1–0)	Beardsley Gym (703); Evanston, IL
Dec 31, 2017; 2:00 pm		Nebraska	L 74–79	12–3 (1–1)	Williams Arena (3,284); Minneapolis, MN
Jan 4, 2018; 6:00 pm		at No. 10 Ohio State	L 75–91	12–4 (1–2)	Value City Arena (4,519); Columbus, OH
Jan 7, 2018; 3:00 pm, BTN		Michigan State	W 83–77	13–4 (2–2)	Williams Arena (3,422); Minneapolis, MN
Jan 10, 2018; 6:00 pm		at Penn State	W 91–71	14–4 (3–2)	Bryce Jordan Center (2,326); University Park, PA
Jan 13, 2018; 1:00 pm, BTN		at No. 21 Rutgers	L 70–80 ^{OT}	14–5 (3–3)	Louis Brown Athletic Center (2,168); Piscataway, NJ
Jan 18, 2018; 7:00 pm		Wisconsin	W 90–65	15–5 (4–3)	Williams Arena (3,588); Minneapolis, MN
Jan 21, 2018; 3:00 pm		No. 20 Iowa	W 77–72	16–5 (5–3)	Williams Arena (4,182); Minneapolis, MN
Jan 31, 2018; 7:00 pm		at Wisconsin	W 71–61	17–5 (6–3)	Kohl Center (3,583); Madison, WI
Feb 4, 2018; 2:00 pm		at Iowa	L 84–92	17–6 (6–4)	Carver–Hawkeye Arena (6,581); Iowa City, IA
Feb 8, 2018; 6:00 pm		at Purdue	W 78–74	18–6 (7–4)	Mackey Arena (5,827); West Lafayette, IN
Feb 11, 2018; 3:00 pm, BTN		Penn State	W 101–68	19–6 (8–4)	Williams Arena (3,794); Minneapolis, MN
Feb 14, 2018; 7:00 pm		No. 23 Michigan	W 93–87	20–6 (9–4)	Williams Arena (2,415); Minneapolis, MN
Feb 18, 2018; 12:00 pm, BTN		No. 10 Maryland	W 93–74	21–6 (10–4)	Williams Arena (4,625); Minneapolis, MN
Feb 20, 2018; 7:00 pm		Indiana	L 70–82	21–7 (10–5)	Williams Arena (3,477); Minneapolis, MN
Feb 25, 2018; 2:00 pm		at Illinois	W 84–75	22–7 (11–5)	State Farm Center (1,638); Champaign, IL
Big Ten Women's Tournament
Mar 2, 2018; 2:30 pm, RSN	(4)	vs. (5) Iowa; Quarterfinals	W 90–89	23–7	Bankers Life Fieldhouse (5,274); Indianapolis, IN
Mar 3, 2018; 5:00 pm, BTN	(4)	vs. (1) No. 13 Ohio State; Semifinals	L 88–90	23–8	Bankers Life Fieldhouse; Indianapolis, IN
NCAA Women's Tournament
Mar 16, 2018*; 4:00 pm, ESPN2	(10 S)	vs. (7 S) No. 21 Green Bay; First Round	W 89–77	24–8	Matthew Knight Arena; Eugene, OR
Mar 18, 2018*; 9:30 pm, ESPN2	(10 S)	at (2 S) No. 6 Oregon; Second Round	L 73–101	24–9	Matthew Knight Arena (7,576); Eugene, OR
*Non-conference game. ^{#}Rankings from AP Poll. (#) Tournament seedings in parentheses. S=Spokane Region. All times are in Central Time.

== Rankings ==
Regular season polls
Poll	Pre- season	Week 2	Week 3	Week 4	Week 5	Week 6	Week 7	Week 8	Week 9	Week 10	Week 11	Week 12	Week 13	Week 14	Week 15	Week 16	Week 17	Week 18	Week 19	Final
AP	NR	NR	NR	NR	NR	NR	NR	NR	NR	NR	NR	NR	NR	RV	RV	RV	RV	RV	RV	N/A
Coaches	NR	NR	NR	NR	NR	NR	NR	NR	NR	NR	NR	NR	NR	NR	NR	RV	RV	RV	RV	RV

Legend
	Increase in ranking
	Decrease in ranking
	Not ranked previous week
(RV)	Received votes

== See also ==
- 2017–18 Minnesota Golden Gophers men's basketball team
