= 2018 MAC women's basketball tournament =

- Classification: Division I
- Season: 2017–18
- Teams: 12
- First round site: Campus sites
- Quarterfinals site: Quicken Loans Arena; Cleveland, Ohio
- Semifinals site: Quicken Loans Arena; Cleveland, Ohio
- Finals site: Quicken Loans Arena; Cleveland, Ohio
- Champions: Central Michigan (4th title)
- Winning coach: Sue Guevara (2nd title)
- MVP: Reyna Frost (Central Michigan)
- Television: CBSSN, ESPN3
- MAC women's basketball tournaments

2017–18 Mid-American Conference women's basketball standings
	Conf.				Overall
Team	W		L	PCT	W		L	PCT
East
Buffalo	16	–	2	.889	29	–	6	.829
Miami (OH)	12	–	6	.667	21	–	11	.656
Ohio	9	–	9	.500	16	–	15	.516
Kent State	5	–	13	.278	13	–	19	.406
Bowling Green	3	–	15	.167	11	–	19	.367
Akron	3	–	15	.167	9	–	21	.300
West
Central Michigan †	17	–	1	.944	30	–	5	.857
Ball State	13	–	5	.722	25	–	7	.781
Western Michigan	9	–	9	.500	18	–	15	.545
Toledo	8	–	10	.444	18	–	15	.545
Northern Illinois	7	–	11	.389	15	–	15	.500
Eastern Michigan	6	–	12	.333	11	–	20	.355
† 2018 MAC tournament winner As of March 24, 2018

The 2018 Mid-American Conference women's basketball tournament was a post-season basketball tournament for the Mid-American Conference (MAC) 2017–18 college basketball season. Tournament first round games was held on campus sites at the higher seed on March 5. The remaining rounds was held at Quicken Loans Arena in Cleveland between March 7–10. Central Michigan won the MAC Women's Tournament received the conference's automatic bid into the 2018 NCAA tournament.

== Format ==
Unlike with the recent tournaments, where the top two seeds received byes into the semifinals, with the three and four seeds receiving a bye to the quarterfinals, the tournament will revert to its original structure in which the top four seeds receive just one bye into the quarterfinals.

== Seeds ==
Seed	School	Conference record	Division	Tiebreaker
1†	Central Michigan	17–1	West	
2†	Buffalo	16–2	East	
3†	Ball State	13–5	West	
4†	Miami (OH)	12–6	East	
5	Ohio	9–9	East	1–0 vs. Western Michigan
6	Western Michigan	9–9	West	0–1 vs. Ohio
7	Toledo	8–10	West	
8	Northern Illinois	7–11	West	
9	Eastern Michigan	6–12	West	
10	Kent State	5–13	East	
11	Bowling Green	3–15	East	2–0 vs. Akron
12	Akron	3–15	East	0–2 vs. Bowling Green
† – Received Bye to quarterfinals. Overall record are as of the end of the regular season.

== Schedule ==
Game	Time	Matchup^{#}	Television
First Round – Monday, March 5
1	7:00 PM	#9 Eastern Michigan at #8 Northern Illinois	ESPN3
2	7:00 PM	#12 Akron at #5 Ohio	ESPN3
3	7:00 PM	#10 Kent State at #7 Toledo	ESPN3
4	5:30 PM	#11 Bowling Green at #6 Western Michigan	ESPN3
Quarterfinals – Wednesday, March 7
5	12:00 NN	#9 Eastern Michigan vs. #1 Central Michigan	ESPN3
6	2:30 PM	#5 Ohio vs. #4 Miami (OH)	ESPN3
7	5:00 PM	#10 Kent State vs. #2 Buffalo	ESPN3
8	7:30 PM	#6 Western Michigan vs. #3 Ball State	ESPN3
Semifinals – Friday, March 9
9	11:00 AM	#1 Central Michigan vs. #4 Miami (OH)	ESPN3
10	1:30 PM	#2 Buffalo vs. #6 Western Michigan	ESPN3
Championship – Saturday, March 10
11	11:00 AM	#1 Central Michigan vs. #2 Buffalo	CBSSN
* Game times in ET. # Rankings denote tournament seed

== Bracket ==
First round Monday, March 5
7	Toledo	76
10	Kent State	80^{OT}
6	Western Michigan	85
11	Bowling Green	71
8	Northern Illinois	77
9	Eastern Michigan	84
5	Ohio	85
12	Akron	73

Quarterfinals; Wednesday, March 7
2	Buffalo	72
10	Kent State	50
3	Ball State	54
6	Western Michigan	65
1	Central Michigan	67
9	Eastern Michigan	64
4	Miami (OH)	69
5	Ohio	66

Semifinals; Friday, March 9
2	Buffalo	85
6	Western Michigan	53
1	Central Michigan	61
4	Miami (OH)	58

Championship; Saturday, March 10
2	Buffalo	91
1	Central Michigan	96

First round games at campus sites of lower-numbered seeds

== All-Tournament Team ==
Tournament MVP – Reyna Frost, Central Michigan

Player	Team
Reyna Frost	Central Michigan
Tinara Moore	Central Michigan
Micaela Kelly	Central Michigan
Stephanie Reid	Buffalo
Cierra Dillard	Buffalo

== See also ==
2018 MAC men's basketball tournament
