= 2017–18 Mid-American Conference women's basketball season =

- League: NCAA Division I
- Sport: Basketball
- Teams: 12

Regular season
- Champions: Central Michigan
- Runners-up: Buffalo
- Season MVP: Tinara Moore

Tournament
- Champions: Central Michigan
- Runners-up: Buffalo
- Finals MVP: Reyna Frost

Mid-American women's basketball seasons
- ← 2016–17 2018–19 →

2017–18 Mid-American Conference women's basketball standings
	Conf.				Overall
Team	W		L	PCT	W		L	PCT
East
Buffalo	16	–	2	.889	29	–	6	.829
Miami (OH)	12	–	6	.667	21	–	11	.656
Ohio	9	–	9	.500	16	–	15	.516
Kent State	5	–	13	.278	13	–	19	.406
Bowling Green	3	–	15	.167	11	–	19	.367
Akron	3	–	15	.167	9	–	21	.300
West
Central Michigan †	17	–	1	.944	30	–	5	.857
Ball State	13	–	5	.722	25	–	7	.781
Western Michigan	9	–	9	.500	18	–	15	.545
Toledo	8	–	10	.444	18	–	15	.545
Northern Illinois	7	–	11	.389	15	–	15	.500
Eastern Michigan	6	–	12	.333	11	–	20	.355
† 2018 MAC tournament winner As of March 24, 2018

The 2017–18 Mid-American Conference women's basketball season began with practices in October 2017, followed by the start of the 2017–18 NCAA Division I women's basketball season in November. Conference play began in January 2018 and concluded in March 2018. Central Michigan won its second straight regular season title with a record of 17–1 by one game over Buffalo. Tinara Moore of Central Michigan was named MAC player of the year.

Top-seeded Central Michigan won the MAC tournament by beating Buffalo 96–91 in the final. Buffalo was given an at large bid as the 11th seed in the Albany Region of the NCAA tournament where they scored wins over #19 South Florida 101–79 and #11 Florida State 86–65 before losing to second seeded #7 South Carolina in the Sweet Sixteen. Central Michigan also reached the Sweet Sixteen in the Spokane Region after defeating #24 LSU 78–69 and #10 Ohio State 95–78. They were knocked out by #6 Oregon. Ball State, Miami, and Toledo all qualified for the WNIT.

== Preseason awards ==
The preseason coaches' poll and league awards were announced by the league office on October 25, 2017.

=== Preseason women's basketball coaches poll ===
(First place votes in parentheses)

==== East Division ====
1. Buffalo (10) 69
2. Kent State (1) 52
3. Ohio (1) 47
4. Miami 40
5. Bowling Green 23
6. Akron 21

==== West Division ====
1. Central Michigan (10) 70
2. Toledo (1) 60
3. Ball State (1) 46
4. Western Michigan 32
5. Northern Illinois 29
6. Eastern Michigan 15

==== Regular Season Champion ====
Central Michigan (10), Ball State (1), Buffalo (1)

==== Tournament champs ====
Central Michigan (9), Ball State (1), Buffalo (1), Western Michigan (1)

=== Honors ===
Honor	Recipient
Preseason All-MAC East	Carly Santoro, Bowling Green, Junior, Guard
Preseason All-MAC East	Stephanie Reid, Buffalo, Senior, Guard
Preseason All-MAC East	Jordan Korinek, Kent State, Senior, Forward
Preseason All-MAC East	Lauren Dickerson, Miami, Sophomore, Guard
Preseason All-MAC East	Taylor Agler, Ohio, R-Senior, Guard
Preseason All-MAC West	Moriah Monaco, Ball State, Senior, Forward
Preseason All-MAC West	Presley Hudson, Central Michigan, Junior, Guard
Preseason All-MAC West	Tinara Moore, Central Michigan, Senior, Forward
Preseason All-MAC West	Mikaela Boyd, Toledo, Junior, Guard
Preseason All-MAC West	Breanna Mobley, Western Michigan, Junior, Forward

== Postseason ==
=== Postseason awards ===
1. Coach of the Year: Sue Guevara, Central Michigan
2. Player of the Year: Tinara Moore, Central Michigan
3. Freshman of the Year: Cece Hooks, Ohio
4. Defensive Player of the Year: Tinara Moore, Central Michigan
5. Sixth Man of the Year: Oshlynn Brown, Ball State

=== Honors ===
Honor	Recipient
Postseason All-MAC First Team	Presley Hudson, Central Michigan
Postseason All-MAC First Team	Tinara Moore, Central Michigan
Postseason All-MAC First Team	Jordan Korinek, Kent State
Postseason All-MAC First Team	Lauren Dickerson, Miami
Postseason All-MAC First Team	Courtney Woods, Northern Illinois
Postseason All-MAC Second Team	Moriah Monaco, Ball State
Postseason All-MAC Second Team	Cierra Dillard, Buffalo
Postseason All-MAC Second Team	Cassie Oursler, Buffalo
Postseason All-MAC Second Team	Stephanie Reid, Buffalo
Postseason All-MAC Second Team	Reyna Frost, Central Michigan
Postseason All-MAC Third Team	Carmen Grande, Ball State
Postseason All-MAC Third Team	Danielle Minott, Eastern Michigan
Postseason All-MAC Third Team	Cece Hooks, Ohio
Postseason All-MAC Third Team	Kaayla McIntyre, Toledo
Postseason All-MAC Third Team	Mikaela Boyd, Toledo
Postseason All-MAC Honorable Mention	Courtnie Lewis, Eastern Michigan
Postseason All-MAC Honorable Mention	Kendall McCoy, Miami
Postseason All-MAC Honorable Mention	Kelly Smith, Northern Illinois
Postseason All-MAC Honorable Mention	Jay-Ann Bravo-Harriott, Toledo
Postseason All-MAC Honorable Mention	Breanna Mobley, Western Michigan
All-MAC Defensive Team	Carmen Grande, Ball State
All-MAC Defensive Team	Stephanie Reid, Buffalo
All-MAC Defensive Team	Tinara Moore, Central Michigan
All-MAC Defensive Team	Cece Hooks, Ohio
All-MAC Defensive Team	Mikaela Boyd, Toledo
All-MAC Freshman Team	Oshlynn Brown, Ball State
All-MAC Freshman Team	Micaela Kelly, Central Michigan
All-MAC Freshman Team	Courtnie Lewis, Eastern Michigan
All-MAC Freshman Team	Cece Hooks, Ohio
All-MAC Freshman Team	Gabby Burris, Ohio

== See also ==
- 2017–18 Mid-American Conference men's basketball season
