= 2017–18 Bowling Green Falcons women's basketball team =

Intercollegiate basketball season

2017–18 Bowling Green Falcons women's basketball

FAU Thanksgiving Tournament Champions
- Conference: Mid-American Conference
- East Division
- Record: 11–19 (3–15 MAC)
- Head coach: Jennifer Roos (6th season)
- Assistant coaches: Nick Moore; Jacey Brooks; Jessie Ivey
- Home arena: Stroh Center

2017–18 Mid-American Conference women's basketball standings
	Conf.				Overall
Team	W		L	PCT	W		L	PCT
East
Buffalo	16	–	2	.889	29	–	6	.829
Miami (OH)	12	–	6	.667	21	–	11	.656
Ohio	9	–	9	.500	16	–	15	.516
Kent State	5	–	13	.278	13	–	19	.406
Bowling Green	3	–	15	.167	11	–	19	.367
Akron	3	–	15	.167	9	–	21	.300
West
Central Michigan †	17	–	1	.944	30	–	5	.857
Ball State	13	–	5	.722	25	–	7	.781
Western Michigan	9	–	9	.500	18	–	15	.545
Toledo	8	–	10	.444	18	–	15	.545
Northern Illinois	7	–	11	.389	15	–	15	.500
Eastern Michigan	6	–	12	.333	11	–	20	.355
† 2018 MAC tournament winner As of March 24, 2018

The 2017–18 Bowling Green Falcons women's basketball team represented Bowling Green State University during the 2017–18 NCAA Division I women's basketball season. The Falcons, led by sixth year head coach Jennifer Roos, played their home games at the Stroh Center as members of the East Division of the Mid-American Conference. They finished the season 11–19, 3–15 in MAC play to finish in a tie for last place in the East Division. They lost in the first round of the MAC women's tournament to Western Michigan.

On March 8, Jennifer Roos was fired. She finished at Bowling Green with a six year record of 92–97. On April 3, the school hired Robyn Fralick to be the next head coach at Bowling Green.

== Roster ==
2017–18 Bowling Green Falcons women's basketball team
Players
Coaches

Pos.	#	Name	Height	Year	Previous school	Hometown
G	1	Kennedy Williams	5 ft 6 in (1.68 m)	Fr	Marshall	Marshall, IL
G/F	3	Andrea Cecil	6 ft 1 in (1.85 m)	So	Oak Harbor	Oak Harbor, OH
G	4	Madisen Parker	5 ft 9 in (1.75 m)	Fr	Homestead	Fort Wayne, IN
G	11	Rachel Myers	5 ft 8 in (1.73 m)	Sr	Liberty–Benton	Findlay, OH
G	13	Sydney Lambert	5 ft 8 in (1.73 m)	Jr	McAuley	Cincinnati, OH
G	14	Carly Santoro	5 ft 10 in (1.78 m)	Jr	Bellevue	Bellevue, OH
G	23	Caterrion Thompson	5 ft 10 in (1.78 m)	So	Lima Senior	Lima, OH
C	24	Jane Uecker	6 ft 3 in (1.91 m)	So	St. Vincent-St. Mary	Akron, OH
C	25	Terri Battle	6 ft 2 in (1.88 m)	Fr	Simeon	Chicago, IL
G	33	Haley Puk	6 ft 0 in (1.83 m)	Sr	Waterloo West	Waterloo, IA
C	40	Clare Glowniak	6 ft 2 in (1.88 m)	RS Fr	Flushing	Corunna, MI
F	42	Sierra Thompson	5 ft 11 in (1.8 m)	Fr	Mattoon	Mattoon, IL
F	44	Maddie Cole	6 ft 0 in (1.83 m)	Jr	Northview	Sylvania, OH
C	55	Angela Perry	6 ft 2 in (1.88 m)	Fr	Rochester	Rochester, IL

Head coach

- Jennifer Roos (Davidson)

Assistant coach(es)

- Jacey Brooks (Buffalo State)
- Nick Moore (Fredonia State)
- Jessie Ivey (West Florida)

Legend

- (C) Team captain
- (S) Suspended
- (I) Ineligible
- (W) Walk-on
- Injured
- Current redshirt

Roster
Last update: December 30, 2017

== Schedule ==
Date time, TV	Rank^{#}	Opponent^{#}	Result	Record	Site (attendance) city, state
Exhibition
11/05/2017*; 2:00 PM, WBGU-TV		Seton Hill	W 92–62		Stroh Center (712); Bowling Green, OH
Non-conference regular season
11/10/2017*; 5:30 PM, ESPN3		Eastern Kentucky	W 77–60	1–0	Stroh Center (937); Bowling Green, OH
11/13/2017*; 11:00 AM, ESPN3		at Detroit	W 85–81	2–0	Calihan Hall (4,127); Detroit, MI
11/16/2017*; 10:00 AM		at Robert Morris	W 64–62	3–0	RMU North Athletic Complex (529); Moon Township, PA
11/19/2017*; 2:00 PM, ESPN3		Canisius	L 57–71	3–1	Stroh Center (1,277); Bowling Green, OH
11/24/2017*; 2:30 PM		vs. Norfolk State; FAU Thanksgiving Tournament semifinals	W 59–50	4–1	FAU Arena (629); Boca Raton, FL
11/25/2017*; 2:30 PM		at Florida Atlantic; FAU Thanksgiving Tournament championship	W 66–55	5–1	FAU Arena (583); Boca Raton, FL
11/28/2017*; 7:00 PM, ESPN3		Valparaiso	W 90–77	6–1	Stroh Center (1,389); Bowling Green, OH
12/06/2017*; 11:00 AM, ESPN3		Xavier	W 63–53	7–1	Stroh Center (4,130); Bowling Green, OH
12/06/2017*; 8:00 PM		at South Dakota State	L 44–76	7–2	Frost Arena (1,771); Brookings, SD
12/18/2017*; 7:00 PM, WBGU-TV		Ferris State	W 82–73	8–2	Stroh Center (1,107); Bowling Green, OH
12/21/2017*; 7:00 PM		at Cincinnati	L 51–75	8–3	Saint Ursula Academy Gym (504); Cincinnati, OH
MAC regular season
12/30/2017; 2:00 PM, ESPN3		at Western Michigan	L 58–67	8–4 (0–1)	University Arena (782); Kalamazoo, MI
01/03/2018; 7:00 PM, ESPN3		Eastern Michigan	L 52–54	8–5 (0–2)	Stroh Center (1,152); Bowling Green, OH
01/06/2018; 2:00 PM, ESPN3		Ball State	L 73–84	8–6 (0–3)	Stroh Center (1,478); Bowling Green, OH
01/10/2018; 7:00 PM, ESPN3		at Central Michigan	L 54–90	8–7 (0–4)	McGuirk Arena (1,494); Mount Pleasant, MI
01/13/2018; 4:30 PM, ESPN3		at Akron	W 66–64	9–7 (1–4)	James A. Rhodes Arena (544); Akron, OH
01/17/2018; 7:00 PM, ESPN3		Kent State	W 60–50	10–7 (2–4)	Stroh Center (1,268); Bowling Green, OH
01/20/2018; 1:00 PM, ESPN3		Ohio	L 63–70	10–8 (2–5)	Stroh Center (3,103); Bowling Green, OH
01/24/2018; 7:00 PM, ESPN3		at Ball State	L 41–42	10–9 (2–6)	Worthen Arena (1,077); Muncie, IN
01/27/2018; 2:00 PM, ESPN3		Toledo	L 67–77	10–10 (2–7)	Stroh Center (2,103); Bowling Green, OH
01/31/2018; 7:00 PM, ESPN3		at Kent State	L 57–81	10–11 (2–8)	MAC Center (490); Kent, OH
02/03/2018; 1:00 PM, ESPN3		Miami (OH)	L 62–66	10–12 (2–9)	Stroh Center (3,540); Bowling Green, OH
02/07/2018; 7:00 PM, ESPN3		Western Michigan	L 67–81	10–13 (2–10)	Stroh Center (1,013); Bowling Green, OH
02/10/2018; 2:00 PM, ESPN3		at Northern Illinois	L 68–73	10–14 (2–11)	Convocation Center (557); DeKalb, IL
02/17/2018; 1:00 PM, ESP2N3		at Ohio	L 58–69	10–15 (2–12)	Convocation Center (6,872); Athens, OH
02/21/2018; 7:00 PM, ESPN3		Buffalo	L 67–88	10–16 (2–13)	Stroh Center (1,060); Bowling Green, OH
02/24/2018; 2:00 PM, ESPN3		at Miami (OH)	L 64–92	10–17 (2–14)	Millett Hall (589); Oxford, OH
02/28/2018; 7:00 PM, ESPN3		Akron	W 84–63	11–17 (3–14)	Stroh Center (1,204); Bowling Green, OH
03/03/2018; 2:00 PM, ESPN3		at Buffalo	L 38–74	11–18 (3–15)	Alumni Arena (2,681); DeKalb, IL
MAC Women's Tournament
03/05/2018; 5:30 pm, ESPN3	(11)	at (6) Western Michigan; First Round	L 71–85	11–19	University Arena (546); Kalamazoo, MI
*Non-conference game. ^{#}Rankings from AP Poll. (#) Tournament seedings in parentheses. All times are in Eastern Time.

== See also ==
2017–18 Bowling Green Falcons men's basketball team
