= 2017–18 Akron Zips women's basketball team =

Intercollegiate basketball season

2017–18 Akron Zips women's basketball
- Conference: Mid-American Conference
- East Division
- Record: 9–21 (3–15 MAC)
- Head coach: Jodi Kest (12th season)
- Assistant coaches: Melissa Jackson; Brianna Sanders; Preston Reid
- Home arena: James A. Rhodes Arena

2017–18 Mid-American Conference women's basketball standings
	Conf.				Overall
Team	W		L	PCT	W		L	PCT
East
Buffalo	16	–	2	.889	29	–	6	.829
Miami (OH)	12	–	6	.667	21	–	11	.656
Ohio	9	–	9	.500	16	–	15	.516
Kent State	5	–	13	.278	13	–	19	.406
Bowling Green	3	–	15	.167	11	–	19	.367
Akron	3	–	15	.167	9	–	21	.300
West
Central Michigan †	17	–	1	.944	30	–	5	.857
Ball State	13	–	5	.722	25	–	7	.781
Western Michigan	9	–	9	.500	18	–	15	.545
Toledo	8	–	10	.444	18	–	15	.545
Northern Illinois	7	–	11	.389	15	–	15	.500
Eastern Michigan	6	–	12	.333	11	–	20	.355
† 2018 MAC tournament winner As of March 24, 2018

The 2017–18 Akron Zips women's basketball team represented the University of Akron during the 2017–18 NCAA Division I women's basketball season. The Zips, led by twelfth year head coach Jodi Kest, played their home games at the James A. Rhodes Arena as members of the East Division of the Mid-American Conference. They finished the season 9–21, 3–15 in MAC play to finish in a tie for last place in the East Division. They lost in the first round of the MAC women's tournament to Ohio.

On April 21, 2018, Jodi Kest announced her retirement after 12 seasons at Akron and 26 seasons as a head coach. She finished with a 26 year record of 405–348.

== Roster ==
2017–18 Akron Zips women's basketball team
Players
Coaches

Pos.	#	Name	Height	Year	Previous school	Hometown
G	2	Alyssa Clay	5 ft 9 in (1.75 m)	So	Pike	Indianapolis, IN
G	3	Shaunay Edmonds	5 ft 4 in (1.63 m)	So	Seton LaSalle	Pittsburgh, PA
G	4	Shayna Harmon	5 ft 9 in (1.75 m)	So	Teays Valley	Ashville, OH
F	5	Haliegh Reinoehl	6 ft 1 in (1.85 m)	So	Westfield	Westfield, IN
F/C	10	Sarah Leyendecker	6 ft 4 in (1.93 m)	Fr	Mother of Mercy	Lawrenceburg, IN
G	11	Megan Sefcik	5 ft 10 in (1.78 m)	RS Jr	Austintown Fitch	Austintown, OH
G	12	Lauren Hung	5 ft 8 in (1.73 m)	Sr	Waterford Mott	Waterford, MI
G	13	Kynnedy Azubike	5 ft 10 in (1.78 m)	Fr	Africentric	Columbus, OH
F	14	Greta Burry	6 ft 1 in (1.85 m)	Sr	St. Joseph Academy	Lakewood, OH
G	21	Kaitlyn Flowers	5 ft 5 in (1.65 m)	RS Jr	St. Joseph	Lompoc, CA
F	24	Caitlin Vari	6 ft 1 in (1.85 m)	So	Revere	Richfield, OH
G	32	Destiny Perkins	5 ft 6 in (1.68 m)	Fr	Lawrence North	Indianapolis, IN
F	34	Fredniqua Walker	6 ft 1 in (1.85 m)	Jr	Shaw	Cleveland, OH

Head coach

- Jodi Kest (Slippery Rock)

Assistant coach(es)

- Melissa Jackson (Richmond)
- Preston Reid (Akron)
- Brianna Sanders (Ohio State)

Legend

- (C) Team captain
- (S) Suspended
- (I) Ineligible
- (W) Walk-on
- Injured
- Current redshirt

Roster
Last update: December 30, 2017

== Schedule ==
Date time, TV	Rank^{#}	Opponent^{#}	Result	Record	Site (attendance) city, state
Exhibition
11/05/2017*; 2:00 PM		Notre Dame (OH)	W 66–39		James A. Rhodes Arena (485); Akron, OH
Non-conference regular season
11/12/2017*; 2:00 PM		at Bucknell	L 52–63	0–1	Sojka Pavilion (722); Lewisburg, PA
11/17/2017*; 7:30 PM, ESPN3		Southeastern Louisiana; Akron Classic	W 66–54	1–1	James A. Rhodes Arena (713); Akron, OH
11/18/2017*; 2:30 PM, ESPN3		Florida Gulf Coast; Akron Classic	L 63–82	1–2	James A. Rhodes Arena (611); Akron, OH
11/22/2017*; 7:00 PM, ESPN3		Eastern Kentucky	W 62–45	2–2	James A. Rhodes Arena (545); Akron, OH
11/28/2017*; 10:30 AM, ESPN3		Winthrop	W 69–43	3–2	James A. Rhodes Arena (1,450); Akron, OH
12/02/2017*; 2:00 PM, ESPN3		No. 15 Maryland	L 54–75	3–3	James A. Rhodes Arena (656); Akron, OH
12/05/2017*; 7:00 PM, ESPN3		Youngstown State	W 75–58	4–3	James A. Rhodes Arena (485); Akron, OH
12/07/2017*; 3:00 PM		at Duquesne	L 60–66	4–4	Palumbo Center (1,213); Pittsburgh, PA
12/16/2017*; 4:30 PM, ESPN3		Ohio Christian	W 93–33	5–4	James A. Rhodes Arena (524); Akron, OH
12/20/2017*; 4:30 PM		vs. SIU Edwardsville; FGCU Hilton Inn Garden Classic	W 59–58	6–4	Alico Arena; Fort Myers, FL
12/21/2017*; 4:30 PM		vs. Harvard; FGCU Hilton Inn Garden Classic	L 63–76	6–5	Alico Arena; Fort Myers, FL
MAC regular season
12/30/2017; 2:00 PM, ESPN3		Buffalo	L 66–89	6–6 (0–1)	James A. Rhodes Arena (522); Akron, OH
01/03/2018; 7:00 PM, ESPN3		at Toledo	L 54–60	6–7 (0–2)	Savage Arena (3,392); Toledo, OH
01/06/2018; 1:00 PM, ESPN3		at Ohio	L 54–60	6–8 (0–3)	Convocation Center; Athens, OH
01/10/2018; 7:00 PM, ESPN3		Ball State	L 61–74	6–9 (0–4)	James A. Rhodes Arena; Akron, OH
01/13/2018; 4:30 PM, ESPN3		Bowling Green	L 64–66	6–10 (0–5)	James A. Rhodes Arena (544); Akron, OH
01/17/2018; 7:00 PM, ESPN3		at Miami (OH)	L 67–75	6–11 (0–6)	Millett Hall (256); Oxford, OH
01/20/2018; 2:00 PM, ESPN3		Central Michigan	L 86–95	6–12 (0–7)	James A. Rhodes Arena (682); Akron, OH
01/24/2018; 7:00 PM, ESPN3		Western Michigan	L 51–59	6–13 (0–8)	James A. Rhodes Arena (473); Akron, OH
01/27/2018; 2:00 PM, ESPN3		Kent State	W 75–60	7–13 (1–8)	James A. Rhodes Arena (704); Akron, OH
01/31/2018; 7:00 PM, ESPN3		at Ball State	L 65–97	7–14 (1–9)	Worthen Arena (1,205); Muncie, IN
02/03/2018; 2:00 PM, ESPN3		at Western Michigan	L 60–76	7–15 (1–10)	University Arena (607); Kalamazoo, MI
02/07/2018; 7:00 PM, ESPN3		Northern Illinois	L 61–84	7–16 (1–11)	James A. Rhodes Arena (505); Akron, OH
02/11/2018; 2:00 PM, ESPN3		at Eastern Michigan	W 77–65	8–16 (2–11)	Convocation Center (933); Ypsilanti, MI
02/17/2018; 1:00 PM, ESPN3		at Buffalo	L 66–89	8–17 (2–12)	Alumni Arena (1,001); Buffalo, NY
02/21/2018; 7:00 PM, ESPN3		Miami (OH)	L 67–75	8–18 (2–13)	James A. Rhodes Arena (553); Akron, OH
02/24/2018; 2:00 PM, ESPN3		at Kent State	L 55–60	8–19 (2–14)	MAC Center; Kent, OH
02/28/2018; 7:00 PM, ESPN3		at Bowling Green	L 63–84	8–20 (2–15)	Stroh Center (1,204); Bowling Green, OH
03/03/2018; 2:00 PM, ESPN3		Ohio	W 62–59	9–20 (3–15)	James A. Rhodes Arena (591); Akron, OH
MAC Women's Tournament
03/05/2018; 7:00 pm	(12)	at (5) Ohio; First Round	L 73–85	9–21	Convocation Center (375); Athens, OH
*Non-conference game. ^{#}Rankings from AP Poll. (#) Tournament seedings in parentheses. All times are in Eastern Time.

== See also ==
- 2017–18 Akron Zips men's basketball team
