= 2017–18 Kent State Golden Flashes women's basketball team =

American college basketball season

2017–18 Kent State Golden Flashes women's basketball
- Conference: Mid-American Conference
- East Division
- Record: 13–19 (5–13 MAC)
- Head coach: Todd Starkey (2nd season)
- Assistant coaches: Fran Recchia; Morgan Toles; Mike McKee
- Home arena: MAC Center

2017–18 Mid-American Conference women's basketball standings
	Conf.				Overall
Team	W		L	PCT	W		L	PCT
East
Buffalo	16	–	2	.889	29	–	6	.829
Miami (OH)	12	–	6	.667	21	–	11	.656
Ohio	9	–	9	.500	16	–	15	.516
Kent State	5	–	13	.278	13	–	19	.406
Bowling Green	3	–	15	.167	11	–	19	.367
Akron	3	–	15	.167	9	–	21	.300
West
Central Michigan †	17	–	1	.944	30	–	5	.857
Ball State	13	–	5	.722	25	–	7	.781
Western Michigan	9	–	9	.500	18	–	15	.545
Toledo	8	–	10	.444	18	–	15	.545
Northern Illinois	7	–	11	.389	15	–	15	.500
Eastern Michigan	6	–	12	.333	11	–	20	.355
† 2018 MAC tournament winner As of March 24, 2018

The 2017–18 Kent State Golden Flashes women's basketball team represented Kent State University during the 2017–18 NCAA Division I women's basketball season. The Golden Flashes, led by second-year head coach Todd Starkey, played their home games at the Memorial Athletic and Convocation Center, also known as the MAC Center, as members of the East Division of the Mid-American Conference (MAC). They finished the season 13–19, 5–13 in MAC play, to finish in fourth place in the West Division. They advanced to the quarterfinals of the MAC women's tournament where they lost to Buffalo.

== Previous season ==
The Flashes finished the 2016–17 regular season with a 19–11 overall record, and 13–5 in MAC play. They won their first East Division title since 2005, clinching a share on March 1 and winning it outright on March 4.

== Roster ==
2017–18 Kent State Golden Flashes women's basketball team
Players
Coaches

Pos.	#	Name	Height	Year	Previous school	Hometown
G	0	Erin Thames	5 ft 6 in (1.68 m)	Fr	Hopewell	Charlotte, NC
G	1	Naddiyah Cross	5 ft 6 in (1.68 m)	Sr	Centerville	Centerville, OH
G	3	Kasey Toles	5 ft 10 in (1.78 m)	Fr	Sandy Creek	Atlanta, GA
F	10	McKenna Stephens	6 ft 0 in (1.83 m)	RS Sr	Lake; Michigan State	Uniontown, OH
F	22	Merissa Barber-Smith	6 ft 4 in (1.93 m)	Jr	La Follette	Madison, WI
G	23	Ali Poole	6 ft 0 in (1.83 m)	So	Carrollton	Carrollton, OH
G	24	Alexa Golden	5 ft 9 in (1.75 m)	Jr	Chartiers Valley	Pittsburgh, PA
G	25	Monique Smith	5 ft 11 in (1.8 m)	Fr	Serra	San Diego, CA
G	31	Megan Carter	5 ft 7 in (1.7 m)	RS So	North Farmington	Farmington Hills, MI
F	33	Kennedy Roberts-Rosser	6 ft 2 in (1.88 m)	Fr	Fairfield	Cincinnati, OH
F	34	Zenobia Bess	6 ft 1 in (1.85 m)	RS Sr	Gahanna Lincoln; Illinois State	Gahanna, OH
F	35	Jordan Korinek	6 ft 2 in (1.88 m)	Sr	St. Vincent-St. Mary	Cuyahoga Falls, OH
G	40	Margaux Eibel	5 ft 11 in (1.8 m)	Fr	La Costa Canyon	Carlsbad, CA
G	44	Tyra James	5 ft 11 in (1.8 m)	RS Jr	Winton Woods	Cincinnati, OH
C	50	Amanda Sape	6 ft 3 in (1.91 m)	Fr	Bloomfield Hills	Bloomfield Hills, MI

Head coach

- Todd Starkey (Montreat)

Assistant coach(es)

- Fran Recchia (Virginia Tech)
- Morgan Toles (Florida State)
- Mike McKee (Kent State)

Legend

- (C) Team captain
- (S) Suspended
- (I) Ineligible
- (W) Walk-on
- Injured
- Current redshirt

Roster
Last update: July 4, 2024

== Schedule ==
Date time, TV	Rank^{#}	Opponent^{#}	Result	Record	Site (attendance) city, state
Non-conference regular season
11/11/2017*; 1:00 p.m., ESPN3		at Northern Kentucky	W 59–54	1–0	BB&T Arena (1,085); Highland Heights, KY
11/14/2017*; 5:15 p.m., ESPN3		at Youngstown State	W 55–44	2–0	Beeghly Center (1,085); Youngstown, OH
11/17/2017*; 5:00 p.m.		vs. Florida Gulf Coast; Akron Classic	L 62–80	2–1	James A. Rhodes Arena; Akron, OH
11/18/2017*; 12:00 p.m.		vs. Southeastern Louisiana; Akron Classic	W 81–60	3–1	James A. Rhodes Arena; Akron, OH
11/23/2017*; 8:30 p.m.		vs. No. 14 Stanford; Play4Kay Shootout quarterfinals	L 54–79	3–2	Mandalay Bay Events Center (1,207); Paradise, NV
11/24/2017*; 6:00 p.m.		vs. Gonzaga; Play4Kay Shootout consolation 2nd round	L 57–77	3–3	Mandalay Bay Events Center (343); Paradise, NV
11/25/2017*; 3:30 p.m.		vs. Memphis; Play4Kay Shootout 7th-place game	W 70–55	4–3	Mandalay Bay Events Center; Paradise, NV
11/30/2017*; 7:00 p.m., ESPN3		Detroit	W 82–74	5–3	MAC Center (493); Kent, OH
12/05/2017*; 7:00 p.m.		at Eastern Kentucky	W 65–57 ^{OT}	6–3	McBrayer Arena (530); Richmond, KY
12/07/2017*; 7:00 p.m., ESPN3		Wright State	L 60–72	6–4	MAC Center (375); Kent, OH
12/10/2017*; 2:00 p.m.		at No. 24 Michigan	L 41–54	6–5	Crisler Arena (2,164); Ann Arbor, MI
12/19/2017*; 10:00 a.m.		at Robert Morris	W 46–31	7–5	RMU North Athletic Complex (407); Moon Township, PA
MAC regular season
12/30/2017; 2:00 p.m., ESPN3		at Eastern Michigan	W 67–60	8–5 (1–0)	Convocation Center (914); Ypsilanti, MI
01/03/2018; 7:00 p.m., ESPN3		at Northern Illinois	L 79–81	8–6 (1–1)	Convocation Center (334); DeKalb, IL
01/06/2018; 4:30 p.m., ESPN3		Western Michigan	L 61–66	8–7 (1–2)	MAC Center (336); Kent, OH
01/10/2018; 7:00 p.m., ESPN3		Eastern Michigan	W 76–69	9–7 (2–2)	MAC Center (914); Kent, OH
01/13/2018; 1:00 p.m., ESPN3		at Central Michigan	L 84–88	9–8 (2–3)	McGuirk Arena (1,756); Mount Pleasant, MI
01/17/2018; 7:00 p.m., ESPN3		at Bowling Green	L 50–60	9–9 (2–4)	Stroh Center (1,268); Bowling Green, OH
01/20/2018; 2:00 p.m., ESPN3		Ball State	L 58–79	9–10 (2–5)	MAC Center (472); Kent, OH
01/24/2018; 7:00 p.m., ESPN3		at Toledo	W 62–55	10–10 (3–5)	Savage Arena (3,722); Toledo, OH
01/27/2018; 2:00 p.m., ESPN3		at Akron	L 60–75	10–11 (3–6)	James A. Rhodes Arena (704); Akron, OH
01/31/2018; 7:00 p.m., ESPN3		Bowling Green	W 81–57	11–11 (4–6)	MAC Center (490); Kent, OH
02/03/2018; 2:00 p.m., ESPN3		Northern Illinois	L 62–72	11–12 (4–7)	MAC Center (546); Kent, OH
02/07/2018; 7:00 p.m., ESPN3		at Buffalo	L 42–80	11–13 (4–8)	Alumni Arena (1,054); Buffalo, NY
02/10/2018; 2:00 p.m., ESPN3		Ohio	L 65–78	11–14 (4–9)	MAC Center (486); Kent, OH
02/17/2018; 4:30 p.m., ESPN3		Miami (OH)	L 59–65	11–15 (4–10)	MAC Center (6,055); Kent, OH
02/21/2018; 7:00 p.m., ESPN3		at Ohio	L 78–79	11–16 (4–11)	Convocation Center (290); Athens, OH
02/24/2018; 2:00 p.m., ESPN3		Akron	W 60–55	12–16 (5–11)	MAC Center; Kent, OH
02/28/2018; 7:00 p.m., ESPN3		Buffalo	L 60–75	12–17 (5–12)	MAC Center (411); Kent, OH
03/03/2018; 1:00 p.m., ESPN3		at Miami (OH)	L 35–58	12–18 (5–13)	Millett Hall (527); Oxford, OH
MAC tournament
03/05/2018; 7:00 p.m., ESPN3	(10)	at (7) Toledo; First round	W 80–76 ^{OT}	13–18	Savage Arena (3,157); Toledo, OH
03/07/2018; 5:00 p.m., ESPN3	(10)	vs. (2) Buffalo; Quarterfinals	L 50–72	13–19	Quicken Loans Arena; Cleveland, OH
*Non-conference game. ^{#}Rankings from AP poll. (#) Tournament seedings in parentheses. All times are in Eastern.

== See also ==
- 2017–18 Kent State Golden Flashes men's basketball team
