= 2017–18 Ball State Cardinals women's basketball team =

Intercollegiate basketball season

2017–18 Ball State Cardinals women's basketball

WNIT, second round
- Conference: Mid-American Conference
- West Division
- Record: 25–7 (13–5 MAC)
- Head coach: Brady Sallee (6th season)
- Assistant coaches: Tennille Adams; Audrey McDonald-Spencer; Ryan Patterson
- Home arena: Worthen Arena

2017–18 Mid-American Conference women's basketball standings
	Conf.				Overall
Team	W		L	PCT	W		L	PCT
East
Buffalo	16	–	2	.889	29	–	6	.829
Miami (OH)	12	–	6	.667	21	–	11	.656
Ohio	9	–	9	.500	16	–	15	.516
Kent State	5	–	13	.278	13	–	19	.406
Bowling Green	3	–	15	.167	11	–	19	.367
Akron	3	–	15	.167	9	–	21	.300
West
Central Michigan †	17	–	1	.944	30	–	5	.857
Ball State	13	–	5	.722	25	–	7	.781
Western Michigan	9	–	9	.500	18	–	15	.545
Toledo	8	–	10	.444	18	–	15	.545
Northern Illinois	7	–	11	.389	15	–	15	.500
Eastern Michigan	6	–	12	.333	11	–	20	.355
† 2018 MAC tournament winner As of March 24, 2018

The 2017–18 Ball State Cardinals women's basketball team represented Ball State University during the 2017–18. The Cardinals, led by sixth-year head coach Brady Sallee, played their home games at Worthen Arena in Muncie, Indiana as members of the West Division of the Mid-American Conference (MAC). They finished the season 25–7, 13–5 in MAC play, to finish in second place in the West Division. They lost in the quarterfinals of the MAC women's tournament to Western Michigan. They received an automatic bid to the Women's National Invitation Tournament, where they defeated Middle Tennessee in the first round before losing in the second round to Purdue.

== Roster ==
2017–18 Ball State Cardinals women's basketball team
Players
Coaches

Pos.	#	Name	Height	Year	Previous school	Hometown
G	2	Katie Helgason	5 ft 6 in (1.68 m)	Fr	Greenfield Central	Indianapolis, IN
G	3	Carmen Grande	5 ft 8 in (1.73 m)	Jr		Madrid, Spain
G	5	Maliah Howard-Bass	5 ft 8 in (1.73 m)	Fr	Columbus North	Columbus, IN
F	11	Keri Kleist	6 ft 4 in (1.93 m)	RS Sr	Sycamore; Cal State Bakersfield	Cincinnati, OH
F	12	Sara Price	6 ft 0 in (1.83 m)	Fr	Howland	Warren, OH
G	20	Frannie Frazier	5 ft 9 in (1.75 m)	Sr	Worthington	Columbus, OH
G	22	Destiny Washington	5 ft 11 in (1.8 m)	Sr	Lawrence North	Indianapolis, IN
G	24	Jasmin Samz	5 ft 9 in (1.75 m)	Fr	Wausaw	Wausau, WI
F	25	Zayn Dornstauder (redshirt)	6 ft 3 in (1.91 m)	Jr	Hamilton; San Francisco	Regina, SK
G	31	Nakeya Penny	5 ft 10 in (1.78 m)	Jr	Logansport	Logansport, IN
F	32	Oshlyn Brown	6 ft 0 in (1.83 m)	Fr	Chillicothe	Chillicothe, OH
F	33	Moriah Monaco	6 ft 0 in (1.83 m)	Sr	Dover	Dover, OH
F	34	Aliyah Walker	5 ft 10 in (1.78 m)	So	Brownsburg	Indianapolis, IN

Head coach

- Brady Sallee (Thomas More)

Assistant coach(es)

- Tennille Adams (Arkansas)
- Audrey McDonald-Spencer (Ball State)
- Ryan Patterson (Malone)

Legend

- (C) Team captain
- (S) Suspended
- (I) Ineligible
- (W) Walk-on
- Injured
- Current redshirt

Roster
Last update: April 21, 2025

== Schedule ==
Date time, TV	Rank^{#}	Opponent^{#}	Result	Record	Site (attendance) city, state
Exhibition
November 1, 2017*; 7:00 p.m.		Illinois–Springfield	W 92–42		Worthen Arena (975); Muncie, IN
Non-conference regular season
November 11, 2017*; 1:00 p.m.		at Cleveland State	W 76–64	1–0	Wolstein Center (304); Cleveland, OH
November 13, 2017*; 7:00 p.m.		Missouri State	W 70–58	2–0	Worthen Arena (1,040); Muncie, IN
November 15, 2017*; 7:00 p.m.		Lipscomb	W 84–46	3–0	Worthen Arena (1,076); Muncie, IN
November 20, 2017*; 1:00 p.m., ESPN3		at Vanderbilt	W 88–79	4–0	Memorial Gymnasium (5,367); Nashville, TN
November 22, 2017*; 1:00 p.m.		at Tennessee State	W 85–65	5–0	Gentry Complex (468); Nashville, TN
November 29, 2017*; 7:00 p.m., ESPN3		Butler	W 87–75	6–0	Worthen Arena (1,564); Muncie, IN
December 4, 2017*; 7:00 p.m.		at Purdue	W 66–60	7–0	Mackey Arena (6,068); West Lafayette, IN
December 7, 2017*; 7:00 p.m., ESPN3		Southeast Missouri State	W 69–56	8–0	Worthen Arena (1,519); Muncie, IN
December 10, 2017*; 2:00 p.m., Sports Link		Oakland City	W 126–55	9–0	Worthen Arena (1,011); Muncie, IN
December 18, 2017*; 11:00 a.m., ESPN3		Austin Peay	W 89–57	10–0	Worthen Arena (3,077); Muncie, IN
December 21, 2017*; 7:00 p.m., ESPN3		Western Kentucky	W 93–81	11–0	Worthen Arena (1,435); Muncie, IN
MAC regular season
December 30, 2017; 2:00 p.m., ESPN3		Central Michigan	L 65–69	11–1 (0–1)	Worthen Arena (1,513); Muncie, IN
January 3, 2018; 7:00 p.m., ESPN3		Miami (OH)	W 86–61	12–1 (1–1)	Worthen Arena (1,111); Muncie, IN
January 6, 2018; 2:00 p.m., ESPN3		at Bowling Green	W 84–73	13–1 (2–1)	Stroh Center (1,478); Bowling Green, OH
January 10, 2018; 7:00 p.m., ESPN3		at Akron	W 74–61	14–1 (3–1)	James A. Rhodes Arena; Akron, OH
January 13, 2018; 2:00 p.m., ESPN3		Buffalo	L 80–84	14–2 (3–2)	Worthen Arena (1,568); Muncie, IN
January 17, 2018; 7:00 p.m., ESPN3		at Toledo	L 66–72	14–3 (3–3)	Savage Arena (3,259); Toledo, OH
January 20, 2018; 2:00 p.m., ESPN3		at Kent State	W 79–58	15–3 (4–3)	MAC Center (472); Kent, OH
January 24, 2018; 7:00 p.m., ESPN3		Bowling Green	W 82–41	16–3 (5–3)	Worthen Arena (1,077); Muncie, IN
January 27, 2018; 2:30 p.m., ESPN3		Northern Illinois	W 81–72	17–3 (6–3)	Worthen Arena (3,867); Muncie, IN
January 31, 2018; 7:00 p.m., ESPN3		Akron	W 97–65	18–3 (7–3)	Worthen Arena (1,205); Muncie, IN
February 3, 2018; 1:00 p.m., ESPN3		at Ohio	L 76–80	18–4 (7–4)	Convocation Center (8,027); Athens, OH
February 7, 2018; 7:00 p.m., ESPN3		Eastern Michigan	W 91–85	19–4 (8–4)	Worthen Arena (1,398); Muncie, IN
February 10, 2018; 2:00 p.m., ESPN3		at Western Michigan	W 81–71	20–4 (9–4)	University Arena; Kalamazoo, MI
February 17, 2018; 3:30 p.m., ESPN3		at Northern Illinois	W 72–50	21–4 (10–4)	Convocation Center (794); DeKalb, IL
February 21, 2018; 7:00 p.m., ESPN3		Western Michigan	W 85–58	22–4 (11–4)	Worthen Arena (1,275); Muncie, IN
February 24, 2018; 2:00 p.m., ESPN3		at Toledo	W 78–73	23–4 (12–4)	Worthen Arena (2,822); Muncie, IN
February 28, 2018; 7:00 p.m., ESPN3		at Central Michigan	L 80–88	23–5 (12–5)	McGuirk Arena (2,132); Mount Pleasant, MI
March 3, 2018; 2:00 p.m., ESPN3		at Eastern Michigan	W 88–63	24–5 (13–5)	Convocation Center (1,370); Ypsilanti, MI
MAC tournament
March 7, 2018; 7:30 p.m., ESPN3	(3)	vs. (6) Western Michigan; Quarterfinals	L 54–65	24–6	Quicken Loans Arena (3,012); Cleveland, OH
WNIT
March 14, 2018; 7:00 p.m.		Middle Tennessee; First round	W 69–60	25–6	Worthen Arena (1,083); Muncie, IN
March 18, 2018; 2:00 p.m., ESPN3		Purdue; Second round	L 72–77	25–7	Worthen Arena (1,307); Muncie, IN
*Non-conference game. ^{#}Rankings from AP poll. (#) Tournament seedings in parentheses. All times are in Eastern.

== Rankings ==
Regular-season polls
Poll	Pre- season	Week 2	Week 3	Week 4	Week 5	Week 6	Week 7	Week 8	Week 9	Week 10	Week 11	Week 12	Week 13	Week 14	Week 15	Week 16	Week 17	Week 18	Week 19	Final
AP							RV	RV	RV											N/A
Coaches		N/A						RV	RV											

Legend
	Increase in ranking
	Decrease in ranking
	Not ranked previous week
(RV)	Received votes

== See also ==
- 2017–18 Ball State Cardinals men's basketball team
