= 2017–18 Northern Illinois Huskies women's basketball team =

Intercollegiate basketball season

2017–18 Northern Illinois Huskies women's basketball
- Conference: Mid-American Conference
- West Division
- Record: 15–15 (7–11 MAC)
- Head coach: Lisa Carlsen (3rd season)
- Assistant coaches: Adam Tandez; John McGinty; Maria Kasza
- Home arena: Convocation Center

2017–18 Mid-American Conference women's basketball standings
	Conf.				Overall
Team	W		L	PCT	W		L	PCT
East
Buffalo	16	–	2	.889	29	–	6	.829
Miami (OH)	12	–	6	.667	21	–	11	.656
Ohio	9	–	9	.500	16	–	15	.516
Kent State	5	–	13	.278	13	–	19	.406
Bowling Green	3	–	15	.167	11	–	19	.367
Akron	3	–	15	.167	9	–	21	.300
West
Central Michigan †	17	–	1	.944	30	–	5	.857
Ball State	13	–	5	.722	25	–	7	.781
Western Michigan	9	–	9	.500	18	–	15	.545
Toledo	8	–	10	.444	18	–	15	.545
Northern Illinois	7	–	11	.389	15	–	15	.500
Eastern Michigan	6	–	12	.333	11	–	20	.355
† 2018 MAC tournament winner As of March 24, 2018

The 2017–18 Northern Illinois Huskies women's basketball team represented Northern Illinois University during the 2017–18 NCAA Division I women's basketball season. The Huskies, led by third-year head coach Lisa Carlsen, played their home games at the Convocation Center in DeKalb, Illinois as members of the West Division of the Mid-American Conference (MAC). They finished the season 15–15, 7–11 in MAC play, to finish in fifth place in the West division. They lost in the first round of the MAC women's tournament to Eastern Michigan.

== Previous season ==
They finished the season 21–12, 12–6 in MAC play, to finish in a tie for third place in the West division. They defeated Ohio and Western Michigan in the MAC tournament before losing to Toledo in the championship. They received an at-large bid to the WNIT where they lost in the first round to South Dakota State.

== Roster ==
2017–18 Northern Illinois Huskies women's basketball team
Players
Coaches

Pos.	#	Name	Height	Year	Previous school	Hometown
G	1	Errin Hodges	6 ft 0 in (1.83 m)	Fr	Central	Evansville, IN
G	3	Gabby Nikitiniate	5 ft 1 in (1.55 m)	Fr	Coopers School	Orpington, England
G/F	4	Courtney Woods	6 ft 0 in (1.83 m)	Jr	St. Margaret's Anglican School	Brisbane, Australia
G	5	Georgia Breunig	5 ft 10 in (1.78 m)	Sr	Sauk Prairie	Sauk Prairie, WI
G	10	Nicole Orr	5 ft 10 in (1.78 m)	RS Jr	Reynoldsburg; Butler	Columbus, OH
F	12	Riley Blackwell	6 ft 1 in (1.85 m)	Fr	Plainfield	Plainfield, IN
G	21	Mikayla Voigt	5 ft 9 in (1.75 m)	Jr	Kettle Moraine Lutheran	Slinger, WI
G	22	Janae Poisson	5 ft 8 in (1.73 m)	So	Marian Catholic	Matteson, IL
G	23	Myia Starks	5 ft 4 in (1.63 m)	So	Neuqua Valley	Oswego, IL
G	24	Paulina Castro	5 ft 8 in (1.73 m)	RS Fr	Harvest Christian	Elgin, IL
F	25	Kelly Smith	6 ft 1 in (1.85 m)	Sr	Arrowhead	Hartland, WI
F	32	Abby Woollacott	6 ft 2 in (1.88 m)	So	Rockford Lutheran	Rockford, IL
F	33	Jazmine Harris	6 ft 0 in (1.83 m)	RS Sr	Heritage Christian	West Allis, WI
F	34	Ally May	6 ft 2 in (1.88 m)	RS So	Arrowhead	Hartland, WI
F	40	Renee Sladek	6 ft 1 in (1.85 m)	RS Jr	Merrill	Merrill, WI

Head coach

- Lisa Carlsen (Northwest Missouri State)

Assistant coach(es)

- John McGinty (Iowa)
- Adam Tandez (Marquette)
- Maria Kasza (Michigan Tech)

Legend

- (C) Team captain
- (S) Suspended
- (I) Ineligible
- (W) Walk-on
- Injured
- Current redshirt

Roster
Last update: July 16, 2024

== Schedule and results ==
Date time, TV	Rank^{#}	Opponent^{#}	Result	Record	Site (attendance) city, state
Exhibition
November 4, 2017*; 1:00 p.m.		Benedictine	W 96–28		Convocation Center; DeKalb, IL
Non-conference regular season
November 10, 2017*; 6:00 p.m.		at Eastern Illinois	W 93–64	1–0	Lantz Arena (338); Charleston, IL
November 15, 2017*; 7:00 p.m.		at Iowa	L 80–105	1–1	Carver–Hawkeye Arena (3,504); Iowa City, IA
November 18, 2017*; 1:00 p.m., ESPN3		Western Illinois	W 96–94	2–1	Convocation Center (550); DeKalb, IL
November 20, 2017*; 7:00 p.m.		at Chicago State	W 80–59	3–1	Jones Convocation Center (255); Chicago, IL
November 24, 2017*; 4:00 p.m.		at UTSA; UTSA Thanksgiving Classic	W 69–55	4–1	Convocation Center (347); San Antonio, TX
November 25, 2017*; 12:00 p.m.		vs. Lamar; UTSA Thanksgiving Classic	L 80–90	4–2	Convocation Center; San Antonio, TX
November 29, 2017*; 6:00 p.m., ESPN3		Bradley	W 76–52	5–2	Convocation Center (636); DeKalb, IL
December 6, 2017*; 11:00 a.m.		Loyola Chicago	W 80–71	6–2	Convocation Center (1,271); DeKalb, IL
December 17, 2017*; 2:00 p.m.		at SIU Edwardsville	W 86–75	7–2	Vadalabene Center (655); Edwardsville, IL
December 20, 2017*; 2:30 p.m.		vs. Sacramento State; Puerto Rico Classic	W 82–56	8–2	Coliseo Rubén Zayas Montañez (105); Trujillo Alto, PR
December 21, 2017*; 12:00 p.m.		vs. Albany; Puerto Rico Classic	L 91–97 ^{OT}	8–3	Coliseo Rubén Zayas Montañez (122); Trujillo Alto, PR
MAC regular season
December 30, 2017; 12:00 p.m., ESPN3		at Miami (OH)	L 65–67	8–4 (0–1)	Millett Hall; Oxford, OH
January 3, 2018; 6:00 p.m., ESPN3		Kent State	W 81–79	9–4 (1–1)	Convocation Center (334); DeKalb, IL
January 6, 2018; 1:00 p.m., ESPN3		Buffalo	W 86–84 ^{OT}	10–4 (2–1)	Convocation Center (593); DeKalb, IL
January 10, 2018; 6:00 p.m., ESPN3		at Western Michigan	L 83–88	10–5 (2–2)	University Arena (635); Kalamazoo, MI
January 13, 2018; 1:00 p.m., ESPN3		at Toledo	L 60–63	10–6 (2–3)	Savage Arena (3,716); Toledo, OH
January 13, 2018; 6:00 p.m., ESPN3		Central Michigan	L 78–81	10–7 (2–4)	Convocation Center (468); DeKalb, IL
January 20, 2018; 1:00 p.m., ESPN3		Eastern Michigan	L 76–83	10–8 (2–5)	Convocation Center (547); DeKalb, IL
January 24, 2018; 6:00 p.m., ESPN3		at Ohio	L 75–77	10–9 (2–6)	Convocation Center (242); Athens, OH
January 27, 2018; 2:30 p.m., ESPN3		at Ball State	L 72–81	10–10 (2–7)	Worthen Arena (3,867); Muncie, IN
January 31, 2018; 6:00 p.m., ESPN3		Miami (OH)	L 62–77	10–11 (2–8)	Convocation Center (457); DeKalb, IL
February 3, 2018; 1:00 p.m., ESPN3		at Kent State	W 72–62	11–11 (3–8)	MAC Center (546); Kent, OH
February 7, 2018; 6:00 p.m., ESPN3		at Akron	W 84–61	12–11 (4–8)	James A. Rhodes Arena (505); Akron, OH
February 10, 2018; 1:00 p.m., ESPN3		Bowling Green	W 72–68	13–11 (5–8)	Convocation Center (557); DeKalb, IL
February 17, 2018; 3:30 p.m., ESPN3		Ball State	L 50–72	13–12 (5–9)	Worthen Arena (794); Muncie, IN
February 21, 2018; 6:00 p.m., ESPN3		at Central Michigan	L 77–91	13–13 (5–10)	McGuirk Arena (1,614); Mount Pleasant, MI
February 24, 2018; 1:30 p.m., ESPN3		at Eastern Michigan	W 84–75	14–13 (6–10)	Convocation Center (2,773); Ypsilanti, MI
February 28, 2018; 6:00 p.m., ESPN3		Toledo	W 89–79	15–13 (7–10)	Convocation Center (463); DeKalb, IL
March 3, 2018; 1:00 p.m., ESPN3		Western Michigan	L 66–85	15–14 (7–11)	Convocation Center (593); DeKalb, IL
MAC women's tournament
March 5, 2018; 5:00 p.m., ESPN3	(8)	(9) Eastern Michigan; First round	L 77–84	15–15	Convocation Center (294); DeKalb, IL
*Non-conference game. ^{#}Rankings from AP poll. (#) Tournament seedings in parentheses. All times are in Eastern.

== See also ==
- 2017–18 Northern Illinois Huskies men's basketball team
