= 2017–18 Western Michigan Broncos women's basketball team =

Intercollegiate basketball season

2017–18 Western Michigan Broncos women's basketball
- Conference: Mid-American Conference
- West Division
- Record: 18–15 (9–9 MAC)
- Head coach: Shane Clipfell (6th season)
- Assistant coaches: Russ Rose; Tangela Smith; Cetera Washington
- Home arena: University Arena

2017–18 Mid-American Conference women's basketball standings
	Conf.				Overall
Team	W		L	PCT	W		L	PCT
East
Buffalo	16	–	2	.889	29	–	6	.829
Miami (OH)	12	–	6	.667	21	–	11	.656
Ohio	9	–	9	.500	16	–	15	.516
Kent State	5	–	13	.278	13	–	19	.406
Bowling Green	3	–	15	.167	11	–	19	.367
Akron	3	–	15	.167	9	–	21	.300
West
Central Michigan †	17	–	1	.944	30	–	5	.857
Ball State	13	–	5	.722	25	–	7	.781
Western Michigan	9	–	9	.500	18	–	15	.545
Toledo	8	–	10	.444	18	–	15	.545
Northern Illinois	7	–	11	.389	15	–	15	.500
Eastern Michigan	6	–	12	.333	11	–	20	.355
† 2018 MAC tournament winner As of March 24, 2018

The 2017–18 Western Michigan Broncos women's basketball team represented Western Michigan University during the 2017–18 NCAA Division I women's basketball season. The Broncos, led by sixth year head coach Shane Clipfell, played their home games at University Arena as members of the West Division of the Mid-American Conference. They finished the season 18–15, 9–9 in MAC play to finish in third place of the West division. They advanced to the semifinals of the MAC women's tournament, where they lost to Buffalo.

== Roster ==
2017–18 Western Michigan Broncos women's basketball team
Players
Coaches

Pos.	#	Name	Height	Year	Previous school	Hometown
G	1	Kia Brooks	5 ft 9 in (1.75 m)	Fr	North Lawndale	Chicago, IL
G	2	Alexis Parks	5 ft 4 in (1.63 m)	Sr	Africentric	Columbus, OH
G	3	Jillian Fletcher	5 ft 9 in (1.75 m)	RS So	Ursuline Academy; West Virginia State	Cincinnati, OH
G	4	Deja Wimby	5 ft 7 in (1.7 m)	Jr	Snider	Fort Wayne, IN
G	5	Nina Farkic	5 ft 9 in (1.75 m)	Fr	Cameron Heights	Kitchener, ON
F	10	Breanna Mobley	6 ft 1 in (1.85 m)	Jr	Lansing Waverly	Lansing, MI
G	11	Kamrin Reed	5 ft 7 in (1.7 m)	So	Holt	Holt, MI
G	14	Najee Smith	5 ft 8 in (1.73 m)	Sr	Neuqua Valley	Naperville, IL
G	15	Aneisha Carlisle	5 ft 9 in (1.75 m)	Sr	Kalamazoo Central	Kalamazoo, MI
G	20	Logan McCane	5 ft 9 in (1.75 m)	Jr	Rockford	Rockford, MI
G/F	22	Meredith Miller	5 ft 10 in (1.78 m)	Jr	Hilliard Bradley	Hilliard, OH
G	23	Jordan Walker	5 ft 8 in (1.73 m)	Fr	Mona Shores	Muskegon, MI
F	24	Leighah-Amori Wool	6 ft 0 in (1.83 m)	Fr	Evanston	Evanston, IL
G	32	LaTondra Brooks	5 ft 5 in (1.65 m)	Sr	Oak Lawn	Oak Lawn, IL
F	33	Marley Hill	6 ft 2 in (1.88 m)	RS Sr	Africentric; Cincinnati	Cleveland, OH
G	34	Jasmyn Walker	5 ft 10 in (1.78 m)	RS Jr	Mona Shores; Valparaiso	Muskegon, MI
C	52	Emma Vanzanten	6 ft 4 in (1.93 m)	So	Northview	Grand Rapids, MI

Head coach

- Shane Clipfell (Eastern Michigan)

Assistant coach(es)

- Russ Rose (Davenport)
- Tangela Smith (Iowa)
- Cetera Washington (Michigan State)

Legend

- (C) Team captain
- (S) Suspended
- (I) Ineligible
- (W) Walk-on
- Injured
- Current redshirt

Roster
Last update: January 1, 2018

== Schedule ==
Date time, TV	Rank^{#}	Opponent^{#}	Result	Record	Site (attendance) city, state
Exhibition
11/03/2017*; 7:00 PM		Lake Superior State	W 72–59		University Arena; Kalamazoo, MI
Non-conference regular season
11/10/2017*; 9:00 PM		at New Mexico	L 76–88	0–1	Dreamstyle Arena (4,145); Albuquerque, NM
11/12/2017*; 4:00 PM, ESPN3		at New Mexico State	W 64–55	1–1	Pan American Center (646); Las Cruces, NM
11/15/2017*; 8:00 PM, ESPN3		at Loyola Chicago	W 65–47	2–1	Joseph J. Gentile Arena (312); Chicago, IL
11/19/2017*; 3:00 PM		at Iowa	L 56–79	2–2	Carver–Hawkeye Arena (3,578); Iowa City, IA
11/24/2017*; 11:00 AM		vs. St. John's; Gulf Coast Showcase quarterfinals	L 48–76	2–3	Germain Arena (1,207); Estero, FL
11/25/2017*; 11:00 AM		vs. Rutgers; Gulf Coast Showcase Consolation 2nd round	L 64–75	2–4	Germain Arena (1,100); Fort Myers, FL
11/26/2017*; 11:00 AM		vs. East Tennessee State; Gulf Coast Showcase 7th place game	W 87–79	3–4	Germain Arena; Estero, FL
11/30/2017*; 7:00 PM, ESPN3		Olivet	W 86–37	4–4	University Arena (1,060); Kalamazoo, MI
12/03/2017*; 12:30 PM		at Michigan State	L 62–65	4–5	Breslin Center (6,313); East Lansing, MI
12/08/2017*; 7:00 PM, ESPN3		Detroit	W 74–62	5–5	University Arena (636); Kalamazoo, MI
12/08/2017*; 7:00 PM, ESPN3		Kentucky State	W 85–50	6–5	University Arena (646); Kalamazoo, MI
12/19/2017*; 6:00 PM, ESPN3		Goshen	W 87–36	7–5	University Arena (192); Kalamazoo, MI
MAC regular season
12/30/2017; 2:00 PM, ESPN3		Bowling Green	W 67–58	8–5 (1–0)	University Arena (782); Kalamazoo, MI
01/03/2018; 2:00 PM, ESPN3		at Buffalo	L 49–71	8–6 (1–1)	Alumni Arena (1,059); Buffalo, NY
01/06/2018; 4:30 PM, ESPN3		at Kent State	W 66–61	9–6 (2–1)	MAC Center (336); Kent, OH
01/10/2018; 7:00 PM, ESPN3		Northern Illinois	W 88–83	10–6 (3–1)	University Arena (635); Kalamazoo, MI
01/13/2018; 2:00 PM, ESPN3		Ohio	L 54–69	10–7 (3–2)	University Arena (415); Kalamazoo, MI
01/17/2018; 7:00 PM, ESPN3		at Eastern Michigan	L 67–69 ^{OT}	10–8 (3–3)	Convocation Center (1,050); Ypsilanti, MI
01/20/2018; 2:00 PM, ESPN3		Miami (OH)	W 81–70	11–8 (4–3)	University Arena (737); Kalamazoo, MI
01/24/2018; 7:00 PM, ESPN3		at Akron	W 59–51	12–8 (5–3)	James A. Rhodes Arena (473); Akron, OH
01/27/2018; 1:00 PM, ESPN3		at Central Michigan	L 70–74	12–9 (5–4)	McGuirk Arena (2,307); Mount Pleasant, MI
01/31/2018; 7:00 PM, ESPN3		Toledo	L 73–78	12–10 (5–5)	University Arena (505); Kalamazoo, MI
02/03/2018; 2:00 PM, ESPN3		Akron	W 76–60	13–10 (6–5)	University Arena (607); Kalamazoo, MI
02/07/2018; 7:00 PM, ESPN3		at Bowling Green	W 81–67	14–10 (7–5)	Stroh Center (1,013); Bowling Green, OH
02/10/2018; 1:00 PM, ESPN3		Ball State	L 71–81	14–11 (7–6)	University Arena; Kalamazoo, MI
02/17/2018; 2:00 PM, ESPN3		at Toledo	L 68–69	14–12 (7–7)	Savage Arena (5,024); Toledo, OH
02/21/2018; 7:00 PM, ESPN3		at Ball State	L 58–85	14–13 (7–8)	Worthen Arena (1,275); Muncie, IN
02/24/2018; 2:00 PM, ESPN3		Central Michigan	L 62–78	14–14 (7–9)	University Arena (1,276); Kalamazoo, MI
02/28/2018; 7:00 PM, ESPN3		Eastern Michigan	W 74–66	15–14 (8–9)	University Arena (659); Kalamazoo, MI
03/03/2018; 2:00 PM, ESPN3		at Northern Illinois	W 85–66	16–14 (9–9)	Convocation Center (593); DeKalb, IL
MAC Women's Tournament
03/05/2018; 5:30 pm, ESPN3	(6)	(11) Bowling Green; First Round	W 85–71	17–14	University Arena (546); Kalamazoo, MI
03/07/2018; 7:30 pm, ESPN3	(6)	vs. (3) Ball State; Quarterfinals	W 65–54	18–14	Quicken Loans Arena (3,012); Cleveland, OH
03/09/2018; 1:30 pm, ESPN3	(6)	vs. (2) Buffalo; Semifinals	L 53–85	18–15	Quicken Loans Arena (1,271); Cleveland, OH
*Non-conference game. ^{#}Rankings from AP Poll. (#) Tournament seedings in parentheses. All times are in Eastern Time.

== See also ==
- 2017–18 Western Michigan Broncos men's basketball team
