= 2017–18 Ohio Bobcats women's basketball team =

Intercollegiate basketball season

2017–18 Ohio Bobcats women's basketball
- Conference: Mid-American Conference
- East Division
- Record: 16–15 (9–9 MAC)
- Head coach: Bob Boldon (5th season)
- Assistant coaches: Tavares Jackson; Mary Evans; Marwan Miller
- Home arena: Convocation Center

2017–18 Mid-American Conference women's basketball standings
	Conf.				Overall
Team	W		L	PCT	W		L	PCT
East
Buffalo	16	–	2	.889	29	–	6	.829
Miami (OH)	12	–	6	.667	21	–	11	.656
Ohio	9	–	9	.500	16	–	15	.516
Kent State	5	–	13	.278	13	–	19	.406
Bowling Green	3	–	15	.167	11	–	19	.367
Akron	3	–	15	.167	9	–	21	.300
West
Central Michigan †	17	–	1	.944	30	–	5	.857
Ball State	13	–	5	.722	25	–	7	.781
Western Michigan	9	–	9	.500	18	–	15	.545
Toledo	8	–	10	.444	18	–	15	.545
Northern Illinois	7	–	11	.389	15	–	15	.500
Eastern Michigan	6	–	12	.333	11	–	20	.355
† 2018 MAC tournament winner As of March 24, 2018

The 2017–18 Ohio Bobcats women's basketball team represented Ohio University during the 2017–18 NCAA Division I women's basketball season. The Bobcats, led by fifth year head coach Bob Boldon, played its home games at the Convocation Center in Athens, Ohio as a member of the Mid-American Conference. They finished the season 16–15, 9–9 in MAC play to finish in third place in the East Division. They advanced to the quarterfinals of the MAC women's tournament, where they lost to Miami (OH).

== Preseason ==
The preseason coaches' poll and league awards were announced by the league office on October 25, 2017. Ohio was picked third in the MAC East

=== Preseason women's basketball coaches poll ===
(First place votes in parentheses)

==== East Division ====
1. Buffalo (10) 69
2. Kent State (1) 52
3. Ohio (1) 47
4. Miami 40
5. Bowling Green 23
6. Akron 21

==== West Division ====
1. Central Michigan (10) 70
2. Toledo (1) 60
3. Ball State (1) 46
4. Western Michigan 32
5. Northern Illinois 29
6. Eastern Michigan 15

==== Regular-season champion ====
Central Michigan (10), Ball State (1), Buffalo (1)

==== Tournament champs ====
Central Michigan (9), Ball State (1), Buffalo (1), Western Michigan (1)

=== Preseason All-MAC ===
Preseason All-MAC teams
Team	Player	Position	Year
Preseason All-MAC East	Taylor Agler	G	Sr.

== Roster ==
2017–18 Ohio Bobcats women's basketball team
Players
Coaches

Pos.	#	Name	Height	Year	Previous school	Hometown
G	0	Taylor Agler	5 ft 9 in (1.75 m)	RS Sr	Olentangy Orange	Westerville, OH
G	1	Cece Hooks	5 ft 8 in (1.73 m)	Fr	Thurgood Marshall	Dayton, OH
G	2	Katie Barker	5 ft 10 in (1.78 m)	RS So	Cary-Grove	Cary, IL
G	3	Amani Burke	5 ft 9 in (1.75 m)	RS So	Eastmoor Academy	Columbus, OH
F	4	Erica Johnson	5 ft 11 in (1.8 m)	Fr	Mansfield Senior	Mansfield, OH
F	5	Alexis Stover	5 ft 11 in (1.8 m)	Fr	Solon	Solon, OH
G	7	Adyn Bucher	—	Jr	Alexander Elementary School	Athens, OH
G	10	Dominique Doseck	5 ft 8 in (1.73 m)	Jr	Athens	Athens, OH
F	13	Olivia Bower	6 ft 1 in (1.85 m)	Jr	Conotton Valley	Bowerston, OH
G	15	Kaylee Bambule	5 ft 8 in (1.73 m)	Fr	Montini Catholic	Plainfield, IL
F	21	Hannah Thome	6 ft 1 in (1.85 m)	RS So	Chagrin Falls	Chagrin Falls, OH
G	24	Meche'la Cobb	6 ft 0 in (1.83 m)	RS Fr	New Albany	New Albany, OH
F	41	Gabby Burris	5 ft 11 in (1.8 m)	Fr	Liberty Union	Baltimore, OH
F	54	Kendall Jessing	6 ft 0 in (1.83 m)	Jr	Sylvania Northview	Sylvania, OH

Head coach

- Bob Boldon (Walsh)

Assistant coach(es)

- Tavares Jackson (Minnesota)
- Mary Evans (Georgia Southern)
- Marwan Miller (Franklin (OH))

Legend

- (C) Team captain
- (S) Suspended
- (I) Ineligible
- (W) Walk-on
- Injured
- Current redshirt

Roster
Last update: December 30, 2017

== Schedule ==
Date time, TV	Rank^{#}	Opponent^{#}	Result	Record	Site (attendance) city, state
Exhibition
11/04/2017*; 1:00 PM		Walsh	L 66–82		Convocation Center; Athens, OH
Non-conference regular season
11/12/2017*; 2:00 PM, ESPN3		High Point	W 64–61	1–0	Convocation Center (370); Athens, OH
11/16/2017*; 11:00 AM, ESPN3		Notre Dame (OH)	W 93–37	2–0	Convocation Center (832); Athens, OH
11/22/2017*; 5:00 PM		at Marshall	W 54–52	3–0	Cam Henderson Center (757); Huntington, WV
11/25/2017*; 2:00 PM		No. 25 Michigan	L 61–74	3–1	Convocation Center (436); Athens, OH
11/28/2017*; 7:00 PM		at Eastern Kentucky	W 69–57	4–1	McBrayer Arena (550); Richmond, KY
12/02/2017*; 3:30 PM, ESPN3		IUPUI	L 52–76	4–2	Convocation Center (335); Athens, OH
12/06/2017*; 11:00 AM		at Cleveland State	L 64–71	4–3	Wolstein Center (2,134); Cleveland, OH
12/10/2017*; 2:00 PM, BTN		at Purdue	W 77–71	5–3	Mackey Arena (5,654); West Lafayette, IN
12/16/2017*; 2:30 PM		vs. Furman; West Palm Beach Invitational	L 68–70	5–4	Student Life Center (250); West Palm Beach, FL
12/17/2017*; 3:30 PM		vs. Virginia; West Palm Beach Invitational	L 59–77	5–5	Student Life Center (200); West Palm Beach, FL
12/28/2017*; 7:00 PM		North Carolina A&T	W 72–65	6–5	Convocation Center (334); Athens, OH
MAC regular season
12/31/2017; 1:00 PM		Toledo	W 78–61	7–5 (1–0)	Convocation Center (361); Athens, OH
01/03/2018; 7:00 PM		at Central Michigan	L 58–82	7–6 (1–1)	McGuirk Arena (1,539); Mount Pleasant, MI
01/06/2018*; 1:00 PM, ESPN3		Akron	W 70–67 ^{OT}	8–6 (2–1)	Convocation Center; Athens, OH
01/10/2018; 1:00 PM		at Toledo	L 57–75	8–7 (2–2)	Savage Arena (3,229); Toledo, Ohio
01/13/2018; 1:00 PM		at Western Michigan	W 69–54	9–7 (3–2)	University Arena (415); Kalamazoo, MI
01/17/2018; 7:00 PM, ESPN3		Buffalo	L 63–67	9–8 (3–3)	Convocation Center (355); Athens, OH
01/20/2018; 1:00 PM		at Bowling Green	W 70–63	10–8 (4–3)	Stroh Center (3,103); Bowling Green, OH
01/24/2018; 7:00 PM, ESPN3		Northern Illinois	W 77–75	11–8 (5–3)	Convocation Center (242); Athens, OH
01/27/2018; 1:00 PM		at Miami (OH)	L 55–64	11–9 (5–4)	Millett Hall; Oxford, OH
02/03/2018; 1:00 PM, ESPN3		Ball State	W 80–76	12–9 (6–4)	Convocation Center (8,027); Athens, OH
02/07/2018; 7:00 PM, ESPN3		Central Michigan	L 72–74	12–10 (6–5)	Convocation Center (265); Athens, OH
02/10/2018; 2:00 PM		at Kent State	W 78–65	13–10 (7–5)	MAC Center (486); Kent, OH
02/14/2018; 7:00 PM		at Eastern Michigan	L 58–73	13–11 (7–6)	Convocation Center (1,033); Ypsilanti, MI
02/17/2018; 1:00 PM, ESPN3		Bowling Green	W 69–58	14–11 (8–6)	Convocation Center (6,872); Athens, OH
02/21/2018; 7:00 PM, ESPN3		Kent State	W 79–78	15–11 (9–6)	Convocation Center (290); Athens, OH
02/24/2018; 1:00 PM		at Buffalo	L 53–70	15–12 (9–7)	Alumni Arena (3,128); Buffalo, NY
02/28/2018; 7:00 PM, ESPN3		Miami (OH)	L 56–78	15–13 (9–8)	Convocation Center (328); Athens, OH
03/03/2018; 2:00 PM, ESPN3		at Akron	L 59–62	15–14 (9–9)	James A. Rhodes Arena (591); Akron, OH
MAC Tournament
03/05/2018; 7:00 pm, ESPN3	(5)	(12) Akron; First Round	W 85–73	16–14	Convocation Center (375); Athens, OH
03/07/2018; 2:30 pm, ESPN3	(5)	vs. (4) Miami (OH); Quarterfinals	L 66–69	16–15	Quicken Loans Arena; Cleveland, OH
*Non-conference game. ^{#}Rankings from AP Poll. (#) Tournament seedings in parentheses. All times are in Eastern Time.

== Awards and honors ==
=== Weekly awards ===
Weekly Award Honors
Honors	Player	Position	Date Awarded	Source
MAC East player of the week	Dominique Doseck	G	January 2	
MAC East player of the week	Cece Hooks	G	January 17	
MAC East player of the week	Taylor Agler	G	March 5	

=== All-MAC awards ===
Postseason All-MAC teams
Team	Player	Position	Year
All-MAC 3rd team	Cece Hooks	G	Fr.
All-MAC Freshman team	Cece Hooks	G	Fr.
All-MAC Defensive team	Cece Hooks	G	Fr.

== See also ==
- 2017–18 Ohio Bobcats men's basketball team
