= 2017–18 Buffalo Bulls women's basketball team =

Intercollegiate basketball season

2017–18 Buffalo Bulls women's basketball

MAC East Division Champions

NCAA women's tournament, Sweet Sixteen
- Conference: Mid-American Conference
- East Division

Ranking
- Coaches: No. 21
- Record: 29–6 (16–2 MAC)
- Head coach: Felisha Legette-Jack (6th season)
- Assistant coaches: Cherie Cordoba; Khyreed Carter; Kristen Sharkey
- Home arena: Alumni Arena

2017–18 Mid-American Conference women's basketball standings
	Conf.				Overall
Team	W		L	PCT	W		L	PCT
East
Buffalo	16	–	2	.889	29	–	6	.829
Miami (OH)	12	–	6	.667	21	–	11	.656
Ohio	9	–	9	.500	16	–	15	.516
Kent State	5	–	13	.278	13	–	19	.406
Bowling Green	3	–	15	.167	11	–	19	.367
Akron	3	–	15	.167	9	–	21	.300
West
Central Michigan †	17	–	1	.944	30	–	5	.857
Ball State	13	–	5	.722	25	–	7	.781
Western Michigan	9	–	9	.500	18	–	15	.545
Toledo	8	–	10	.444	18	–	15	.545
Northern Illinois	7	–	11	.389	15	–	15	.500
Eastern Michigan	6	–	12	.333	11	–	20	.355
† 2018 MAC tournament winner As of March 24, 2018

The 2017–18 Buffalo Bulls women's basketball team represented the University at Buffalo during the 2017–18 NCAA Division I women's basketball season. The Bulls, led by sixth-year head coach Felisha Legette-Jack, played their home games at Alumni Arena as members of the East Division of the Mid-American Conference. They finished the season 29–6, 16–2 in MAC play to win MAC East Division. They advanced to the championship game of the MAC women's tournament, where they lost to Central Michigan. They received an at-large bid to the NCAA women's tournament, where they upset South Florida in the first round to win their first NCAA tournament game in school history, and beat Florida State in the second round, to advance to the sweet sixteen for the first time in school history. They lost to South Carolina. With 29 wins, they finished with the most wins in school history.

== Roster ==
2017–18 Buffalo Bulls women's basketball team
Players
Coaches

Pos.	#	Name	Height	Year	Previous school	Hometown
F	0	Summer Hemphill	6 ft 1 in (1.85 m)	So	Cardinal O'Hara	Buffalo, NY
G	1	Stephanie Reid	5 ft 6 in (1.68 m)	Sr	The Peninsula School	Melbourne, Australia
G	3	Liisa Ups	5 ft 9 in (1.75 m)	Sr	Smith's Hill	Wollongong, Australia
G	4	Hanna Hall	5 ft 3 in (1.6 m)	Fr	Lincoln Prep	Hamilton, ON
G	5	Katherine Ups	5 ft 9 in (1.75 m)	Sr	Smith's Hill	Wollongong, Australia
G	11	Theresa Onwuka	5 ft 10 in (1.78 m)	So	Lake Forest Academy	Asaba, Nigeria
F	12	Courtney Wilkins	6 ft 1 in (1.85 m)	Jr	Haileybury College	Melbourne, Australia
G	13	Autumn Jones	5 ft 8 in (1.73 m)	Jr	Lawrence North; Pensacola State	Indianapolis, IN
F	21	Mariah Suchan	6 ft 1 in (1.85 m)	Sr	Maize South	Wichita, KS
G	22	Ayoleka Sodade	5 ft 9 in (1.75 m)	Jr	Holy Names Catholic	Windsor, ON
G	24	Cierra Dillard	5 ft 9 in (1.75 m)	RS Jr	Gates Chili; Massachusetts	Rochester, NY
F	30	Marissa Hamilton	5 ft 11 in (1.8 m)	Fr	Ellicottville Central	Great Valley, NY
C	31	Cassie Oursler	6 ft 3 in (1.91 m)	Sr	Grand Island	Grand Island, NY
F	32	Brittany Morrison	5 ft 9 in (1.75 m)	Jr	St. Joseph Academy	North Ridgeville, OH

Head coach

- Felisha Legette-Jack (Syracuse)

Assistant coach(es)

- Cherie Cordoba (UNLV)
- Khyreed Carter (Michigan State)
- Kristen Sharkey (Buffalo)

Legend

- (C) Team captain
- (S) Suspended
- (I) Ineligible
- (W) Walk-on
- Injured
- Current redshirt

Roster
Last update: December 30, 2017

== Schedule ==
Date time, TV	Rank^{#}	Opponent^{#}	Result	Record	High points	High rebounds	High assists	Site (attendance) city, state
Exhibition
November 3, 2017*; 5:30 p.m.		Bloomsburg	W 64–32	–	20 – C. Oursler	7 – C. Oursler	4 – S. Reid	Alumni Arena; Buffalo, NY
Non-conference regular season
November 10, 2017*; 1:00 p.m.		Delaware	W 87–73	1–0	17 – C. Dillard	6 – K. Ups	11 – S. Reid	Alumni Arena (1,015); Buffalo, NY
November 13, 2017*; 7:00 p.m.		Maryland Eastern Shore	W 76–41	2–0	12 – S. Hemphill	9 – Tier	6 – C. Dillard	Alumni Arena (966); Buffalo, NY
November 23, 2017*; 4:15 p.m.		vs. Nebraska; San Juan Shootout	W 82–72	3–0	25 – C. Dillard	7 – S. Hemphill	5 – S. Reid	Ocean Center; Daytona Beach, FL
November 24, 2017*; 6:30 p.m.		vs. Clemson; San Juan Shootout	W 61–41	4–0	13 – C. Oursler	14 – S. Hemphill	4 – K. Ups	Ocean Center (175); Daytona Beach, FL
December 2, 2017*; 2:36 p.m., P12N		at Arizona State; ASU Classic semifinals	L 57–76	4–1	18 – C. Dillard	5 – B. Morrison	2 – Tied	Wells Fargo Arena (2,233); Tempe, AZ
December 3, 2017*; 12:04 p.m.		vs. UNLV; ASU Classic 3rd place game	W 80–53	5–1	18 – C. Dillard	6 – Tied	7 – H. Hall	Wells Fargo Arena; Tempe, AZ
December 7, 2017*; 7:00 p.m.		Canisius	W 73–47	6–1	14 – Tied	7 – Tied	8 – K. Ups	Alumni Arena (1,354); Buffalo, NY
December 9, 2017; 2:00 p.m.		at Columbia	W 65–63	7–1	26 – C. Oursler	11 – C. Oursler	5 – C. Dillard	Levien Gymnasium (371); New York, NY
December 15, 2017*; 7:00 p.m.		at St. Bonaventure	W 76–59	8–1	15 – S. Reid	8 – B. Morrison	10 – C. Dillard	Reilly Center (876); Olean, NY
December 18, 2017*; 7:00 p.m.		at Niagara	L 62–75	8–2	16 – C. Oursler	9 – S. Hemphill	6 – Tied	Gallagher Center (410); Niagara, NY
December 21, 2017*; 11:01 a.m.		at St. John's	W 73–72	9–2	17 – A. Jones	10 – S. Hemphill	5 – S. Reid	Carnesecca Arena (5,602); Queens, NY
MAC regular season
December 30, 2017; 2:00 p.m.		at Akron	W 89–66	10–2 (1–0)	18 – Tied	6 – S. Reid	10 – S. Reid	James A. Rhodes Arena (522); Akron, OH
January 3, 2018; 7:00 p.m.		Western Michigan	W 71–49	11–2 (2–0)	23 – C. Dillard	9 – C. Oursler	12 – S. Reid	Alumni Arena (1,059); Buffalo, NY
January 6, 2018; 2:00 p.m.		at Northern Illinois	L 84–86 ^{OT}	11–3 (2–1)	18 – C. Dillard	12 – C. Oursler	11 – S. Reid	Convocation Center (593); DeKalb, IL
January 10, 2018; 7:00 p.m.		Miami (OH)	W 72–67	12–3 (3–1)	19 – C. Dillard	6 – Tied	8 – C. Dillard	Alumni Arena (1,032); Buffalo, NY
January 13, 2018; 2:00 p.m.		at Ball State	W 84–80	13–3 (4–1)	20 – C. Dillard	10 – S. Hemphill	9 – S. Reid	Worthen Arena (1,568); Muncie, IN
January 17, 2018; 7:00 p.m., ESPN3		at Ohio	W 67–63	14–3 (5–1)	20 – C. Dillard	10 – S. Hemphill	5 – Tied	Convocation Center (355); Athens, OH
January 20, 2018; 2:00 p.m.		Toledo	W 87–69	15–3 (6–1)	30 – C. Dillard	10 – S. Hemphill	10 – S. Reid	Alumni Arena (1,899); Buffalo, NY
January 27, 2018; 2:00 p.m.		Eastern Michigan	W 97–92 ^{OT}	16–3 (7–1)	25 – C. Oursler	13 – C. Oursler	9 – S. Reid	Alumni Arena (1,630); Buffalo, NY
January 31, 2018; 7:00 p.m.		at Central Michigan	L 79–86	16–4 (7–2)	22 – C. Dillard	10 – S. Hemphill	5 – C. Dillard	McGuirk Arena (1,765); Mount Pleasant, MI
February 3, 2018; 2:00 p.m.		at Toledo	W 84–73	17–4 (8–2)	21 – C. Dillard	13 – S. Hemphill	4 – C. Dillard	Savage Arena (4,613); Toledo, OH
February 7, 2018; 7:00 p.m.		Kent State	W 80–42	18–4 (9–2)	19 – C. Oursler	14 – C. Oursler	8 – S. Reid	Alumni Arena (1,054); Buffalo, NY
February 10, 2018; 1:02 p.m.		at Miami (OH)	W 64–49	19–4 (10–2)	16 – S. Reid	13 – C. Oursler	6 – Tied	Millett Hall (1,507); Oxford, OH
February 14, 2018; 7:00 p.m.		Central Michigan	W 85–82	20–4 (11–2)	24 – C. Oursler	13 – C. Oursler	9 – C. Dillard	Alumni Arena (1,010); Buffalo, NY
February 17, 2018; 1:00 p.m.		Akron	W 85–71	21–4 (12–2)	18 – S. Hemphill	9 – S. Hemphill	10 – S. Reid	Alumni Arena (1,001); Buffalo, NY
February 21, 2018; 7:00 p.m.		at Bowling Green	W 88–67	22–4 (13–2)	20 – C. Oursler	12 – C. Oursler	7 – C. Dillard	Stroh Center (1,060); Bowling Green, OH
February 24, 2018; 1:00 p.m.		Ohio	W 70–53	23–4 (14–2)	12 – C. Oursler	23 – S. Hemphill	7 – S. Reid	Alumni Arena (3,128); Buffalo, NY
February 28, 2018; 7:00 p.m.		at Kent State	W 81–51	24–4 (15–2)	17 – C. Dillard	6 – S. Hemphill	5 – A. Jones	MAC Center (411); Kent, OH
March 3, 2018; 2:00 p.m.		Bowling Green	W 74–38	25–4 (16–2)	12 – C. Oursler	8 – S. Hemphill	7 – S. Reid	Alumni Arena (2,681); Buffalo, NY
MAC Women's Tournament
March 7, 2018; 5:00 p.m.	(2)	vs. (10) Kent State; Quarterfinals	W 72–50	26–4	22 – S. Reid	11 – C. Dillard	11 – S. Reid	Quicken Loans Arena (1,422); Cleveland, OH
March 9, 2018; 1:30 p.m.	(2)	vs. (6) Western Michigan; Semifinals	W 85–53	27–4	17 – C. Dillard	6 – S. Hemphill	7 – C. Dillard	Quicken Loans Arena (1,271); Cleveland, OH
March 10, 2018; 11:00 a.m., CBSSN	(2)	vs. (1) Central Michigan; Championship Game	L 91–96	27–5	26 – C. Dillard	7 – S. Hemphill	10 – C. Dillard	Quicken Loans Arena (1,656); Cleveland, OH
NCAA Women's Tournament
March 17, 2018*; 1:30 p.m., ESPN2	(11 A)	vs. (6 A) No. 19 South Florida; First Round	W 101–79	28–5	36 – C. Dillard	7 – K. Ups	8 – S. Reid	Donald L. Tucker Center (3,507); Tallahassee, FL
March 19, 2018*; 6:30 p.m., ESPN2	(11 A)	at (3 A) No. 11 Florida State; Second Round	W 86–65	29–5	22 – C. Dillard	11 – S. Hemphill	5 – C. Dillard	Donald L. Tucker Center (4,119); Tallahassee, FL
March 24, 2018*; 11:30 a.m., ESPN	(11 A)	vs. (2 A) No. 7 South Carolina; Sweet Sixteen	L 63–79	29–6	29 – C. Dillard	4 – C. Oursler	6 – C. Dillard	Times Union Center (10,310); Albany, NY
*Non-conference game. ^{#}Rankings from AP Poll. (#) Tournament seedings in parentheses. A=Albany Region. All times are in Eastern Time.

== Rankings ==
Regular season polls
Poll	Pre- season	Week 2	Week 3	Week 4	Week 5	Week 6	Week 7	Week 8	Week 9	Week 10	Week 11	Week 12	Week 13	Week 14	Week 15	Week 16	Week 17	Week 18	Week 19	Final
AP																	RV			N/A
Coaches		N/A										RV	RV	RV	RV	RV	RV	RV	RV	21

Legend
	Increase in ranking
	Decrease in ranking
	Not ranked previous week
(RV)	Received votes

== See also ==
- 2017–18 Buffalo Bulls men's basketball team
