= 2017–18 Central Michigan Chippewas women's basketball team =

Intercollegiate basketball season

2017–18 Central Michigan Chippewas women's basketball

Junkanoo Jam Champions MAC West Division Champions MAC Regular Season Champions MAC tournament champions

NCAA women's tournament, Sweet Sixteen
- Conference: Mid-American Conference
- West Division

Ranking
- Coaches: No. 20
- Record: 30–5 (17–1 MAC)
- Head coach: Sue Guevara (11th season)
- Assistant coaches: Heather Oesterle; Murriel Page; Courtney Shelton
- Home arena: McGuirk Arena

2017–18 Mid-American Conference women's basketball standings
	Conf.				Overall
Team	W		L	PCT	W		L	PCT
East
Buffalo	16	–	2	.889	29	–	6	.829
Miami (OH)	12	–	6	.667	21	–	11	.656
Ohio	9	–	9	.500	16	–	15	.516
Kent State	5	–	13	.278	13	–	19	.406
Bowling Green	3	–	15	.167	11	–	19	.367
Akron	3	–	15	.167	9	–	21	.300
West
Central Michigan †	17	–	1	.944	30	–	5	.857
Ball State	13	–	5	.722	25	–	7	.781
Western Michigan	9	–	9	.500	18	–	15	.545
Toledo	8	–	10	.444	18	–	15	.545
Northern Illinois	7	–	11	.389	15	–	15	.500
Eastern Michigan	6	–	12	.333	11	–	20	.355
† 2018 MAC tournament winner As of March 24, 2018

The 2017–18 Central Michigan Chippewas women's basketball team represented Central Michigan University during the 2017–18 NCAA Division I women's basketball season. The Chippewas, led by eleventh-year head coach Sue Guevara, played their home games at McGuirk Arena as members of the West Division of the Mid-American Conference. They finished the season 30–5, 16–1 in MAC play to win MAC West Division. They won the MAC women's tournament and earned an automatic bid to the NCAA women's tournament, where they upset LSU in the first round to win their first NCAA tournament win in school history, and Ohio State in the second round, to advance to the sweet sixteen for the first time in school history. They lost to Oregon. With 30 wins, they finished with the most wins in school history.

== Roster ==
2017–18 Central Michigan Chippewas women's basketball team
Players
Coaches

Pos.	#	Name	Height	Year	Previous school	Hometown
G	1	Micaela Kelly	5 ft 6 in (1.68 m)	RS Fr	Detroit Martin Luther King; DePaul	Detroit, MI
F	2	Tinara Moore	6 ft 3 in (1.91 m)	Sr	Southgate Anderson	Southgate, MI
G	3	Presley Hudson	6 ft 0 in (1.83 m)	Jr	Wayland Union	Wayland, MI
G	4	Maddy Watters	5 ft 9 in (1.75 m)	Fr	Rockford	Rockford, MI
G	5	Aleah Swary	5 ft 10 in (1.78 m)	Sr	Northrop	Fort Wayne, IN
G	10	Cassie Breen	5 ft 10 in (1.78 m)	Sr	Woodhaven	Woodhaven, MI
G	11	Sophia Karasinski	5 ft 9 in (1.75 m)	Fr	Grand Rapids Catholic Central	Grand Rapids, MI
F	13	Reyna Frost	6 ft 0 in (1.83 m)	Jr	Reese	Reese, MI
G	14	Amani Corley	5 ft 8 in (1.73 m)	Sr	Southgate Anderson	Southgate, MI
C	20	Annie Yost	6 ft 2 in (1.88 m)	Fr	Livonia Churchill	Livonia, MI
G	21	Jeada Robinson	5 ft 8 in (1.73 m)	Jr	Bloomfield Hills Marian	Bloomfield Hills, MI
G	22	Kalle Martinez	5 ft 6 in (1.68 m)	Fr	John Glenn	Bay City, MI
F	33	Gabrielle Bird	6 ft 0 in (1.83 m)	RS So	South Lyon East	South Lyon, MI
G/F	42	MacKenna Kelly	5 ft 10 in (1.78 m)	So	Frankfort	Frankfort, MI
F	50	Kyra Bussell	6 ft 1 in (1.85 m)	Fr	Grand Rapids Catholic Central	Grand Rapids, MI
C	55	Averi Gamble	6 ft 3 in (1.91 m)	So	Sacred Heart	Mount Pleasant, MI

Head coach

- Sue Guevara (Saginaw Valley State)

Assistant coach(es)

- Heather Oesterle (Michigan)
- Murriel Page (Florida)
- Courtney Shelton (Northern Illinois)

Legend

- (C) Team captain
- (S) Suspended
- (I) Ineligible
- (W) Walk-on
- Injured
- Current redshirt

Roster
Last update: December 30, 2017

== Schedule ==
Date time, TV	Rank^{#}	Opponent^{#}	Result	Record	Site (attendance) city, state
Non-conference regular season
November 10, 2017*; 7:30 PM, ESPN3		Purdue	L 69–79	0–1	McGuirk Arena (2,035); Mount Pleasant, MI
November 14, 2017*; 7:00 PM, ESPN3		Vanderbilt	W 92–72	1–1	McGuirk Arena (1,500); Mount Pleasant, MI
November 17, 2017*; 12:00 PM, CSN		College of Charleston	W 79–58	2–1	McGuirk Arena (3,084); Mount Pleasant, MI
November 24, 2017*; 5:15 PM		vs. San Diego State; Junkanoo Jam Bimini Division semifinals	W 85–76 ^{OT}	3–1	Gateway Christian Academy; Bimini, Bahamas
November 25, 2017*; 6:45 PM		vs. Iowa State; Junkanoo Jam Bimini Division championship	W 81–60	4–1	Gateway Christian Academy; Bimini, Bahamas
November 30, 2017*; 7:00 PM		Aquinas	W 96–47	5–1	McGuirk Arena (1,509); Mount Pleasant, MI
December 3, 2017*; 1:00 PM, ESPN3		at Oakland	W 103–85	6–1	Athletics Center O'rena (862); Auburn Hills, MI
December 7, 2017*; 8:00 PM, ESPN3		at SIU Edwardsville	W 94–56	7–1	Vadalabene Center (647); Edwardsville, IL
December 9, 2017*; 1:00 PM, ESPN3		at Indiana State	W 77–67	8–1	Hulman Center (1,322); Terre Haute, IN
December 17, 2017*; 2:30 PM		at Duquesne	L 61–64	8–2	Palumbo Center (721); Pittsburgh, PA
December 21, 2017*; 7:00 PM, ESPN3		Quinnipiac	L 70–84	8–3	McGuirk Arena (1,645); Mount Pleasant, MI
MAC regular season
December 30, 2017; 2:00 PM, ESPN3		at Ball State	W 69–65	9–3 (1–0)	Worthen Arena (1,513); Muncie, IN
January 3, 2018; 7:00 PM, ESPN3		Ohio	W 82–58	10–3 (2–0)	McGuirk Arena (1,539); Mount Pleasant, MI
January 6, 2018; 1:00 PM, ESPN3		at Miami (OH)	W 84–66	11–3 (3–0)	Millett Hall (1,003); Oxford, OH
January 10, 2018; 7:00 PM, ESPN3		Bowling Green	W 90–54	12–3 (4–0)	McGuirk Arena (1,494); Mount Pleasant, MI
January 13, 2018; 1:00 PM, ESPN3		Kent State	W 88–84	13–3 (5–0)	McGuirk Arena (1,756); Mount Pleasant, MI
January 17, 2018; 7:00 PM, ESPN3		at Northern Illinois	W 81–78	14–3 (6–0)	Convocation Center (468); DeKalb, IL
January 20, 2018; 2:00 PM, ESPN3		at Akron	W 95–86	15–3 (7–0)	James A. Rhodes Arena (682); Akron, OH
January 27, 2018; 1:00 PM, ESPN3		Western Michigan	W 74–70	16–3 (8–0)	McGiurk Arena (2,307); Mount Pleasant, MI
January 31, 2018; 7:00 PM, ESPN3		Buffalo	W 86–79	17–3 (9–0)	McGiurk Arena (1,765); Mount Pleasant, MI
February 3, 2018; 2:30 PM, ESPN3		at Eastern Michigan	W 95–72	18–3 (10–0)	Convocation Center (2,520); Ypsilanti, MI
February 7, 2018; 7:00 PM, ESPN3		at Ohio	W 74–72	19–3 (11–0)	Convocation Center (265); Muncie, IN
February 10, 2018; 1:00 PM, ESPN3		Toledo	W 85–47	20–3 (12–0)	McGuirk Arena (1,888); Mount Pleasant, MI
February 14, 2018; 7:00 PM, ESPN3		at Buffalo	L 82–85	20–4 (12–1)	Alumni Arena (1,010); Buffalo, NY
February 17, 2018; 7:00 PM, ESPN3		Eastern Michigan	W 95–82	21–4 (13–1)	McGuirk Arena (2,189); Mount Pleasant, MI
February 21, 2018; 7:00 PM, ESPN3		Northern Illinois	W 91–77	22–4 (14–1)	McGuirk Arena (1,614); Mount Pleasant, MI
February 24, 2018; 2:00 PM, ESPN3		at Western Michigan	W 78–62	23–4 (15–1)	University Arena (1,276); Kalamazoo, MI
February 28, 2018; 7:00 PM, ESPN3		Ball State	W 88–80	24–4 (15–1)	McGuirk Arena (2,132); Mount Pleasant, MI
March 3, 2018; 2:00 PM, ESPN3		at Toledo	W 72–67	25–4 (17–1)	Savage Arena (4,837); Toledo, OH
MAC Women's Tournament
March 7, 2018; 12:00 pm, ESPN3	(1)	vs. (9) Eastern Michigan; Quarterfinals	W 67–64	26–4	Quicken Loans Arena; Cleveland, OH
March 9, 2018; 11:00 am, ESPN3	(1)	vs. (4) Miami (OH); Semifinals	W 61–58	27–4	Quicken Loans Arena; Cleveland, OH
March 10, 2018; 11:00 am, CBSSN	(1)	vs. (2) Buffalo; Championship Game	W 96–91	28–4	Quicken Loans Arena (1,656); Cleveland, OH
NCAA Women's Tournament
March 17, 2018*; 11:00 am, ESPN2	(11 S)	vs. (6 S) No. 24 LSU; First Round	W 78–69	29–4	St. John Arena; Columbus, OH
March 19, 2018*; 6:30 pm, ESPN2	(11 S)	at (3 S) No. 10 Ohio State; Second Round	W 95–78	30–4	St. John Arena (3,571); Columbus, OH
March 24, 2018*; 6:30 pm, ESPN	(11 S)	vs. (2 S) No. 6 Oregon; Sweet Sixteen	L 69–83	30–5	Spokane Arena (5,084); Spokane, WA
*Non-conference game. ^{#}Rankings from AP Poll. (#) Tournament seedings in parentheses. S=Spokane Region. All times are in Eastern Time.

== Rankings ==
Regular season polls
Poll	Pre- season	Week 2	Week 3	Week 4	Week 5	Week 6	Week 7	Week 8	Week 9	Week 10	Week 11	Week 12	Week 13	Week 14	Week 15	Week 16	Week 17	Week 18	Week 19	Final
AP														RV	RV	RV	RV	RV	RV	N/A
Coaches		N/A										RV	RV	RV	RV	RV	RV	RV	RV	20

Legend
	Increase in ranking
	Decrease in ranking
	Not ranked previous week
(RV)	Received votes

== See also ==
- 2017–18 Central Michigan Chippewas men's basketball team
