= 2017–18 Eastern Michigan Eagles women's basketball team =

Intercollegiate basketball season

2017–18 Eastern Michigan Eagles women's basketball
- Conference: Mid-American Conference
- West Division
- Record: 11–20 (6–12 MAC)
- Head coach: Fred Castro (2nd season)
- Assistant coaches: Adam Call; Abi Olajuwon; Cassandra Callaway
- Home arena: Convocation Center

2017–18 Mid-American Conference women's basketball standings
	Conf.				Overall
Team	W		L	PCT	W		L	PCT
East
Buffalo	16	–	2	.889	29	–	6	.829
Miami (OH)	12	–	6	.667	21	–	11	.656
Ohio	9	–	9	.500	16	–	15	.516
Kent State	5	–	13	.278	13	–	19	.406
Bowling Green	3	–	15	.167	11	–	19	.367
Akron	3	–	15	.167	9	–	21	.300
West
Central Michigan †	17	–	1	.944	30	–	5	.857
Ball State	13	–	5	.722	25	–	7	.781
Western Michigan	9	–	9	.500	18	–	15	.545
Toledo	8	–	10	.444	18	–	15	.545
Northern Illinois	7	–	11	.389	15	–	15	.500
Eastern Michigan	6	–	12	.333	11	–	20	.355
† 2018 MAC tournament winner As of March 24, 2018

The 2017–18 Eastern Michigan Eagles women's basketball team represented Eastern Michigan University during the 2017–18 NCAA Division I women's basketball season. The Eagles, led by second year head coach Fred Castro, played their home games at the Convocation Center, as members of the West Division of the Mid-American Conference. They finished the season 11–20, 6–12 in MAC play to finish in last place in the West Division. They advance to the quarterfinals of the MAC women's tournament, where they lost to Central Michigan.

== Roster ==
2017–18 Eastern Michigan Eagles women's basketball team
Players
Coaches

Pos.	#	Name	Height	Year	Previous school	Hometown
G	0	Tiffany Suarez	5 ft 11 in (1.8 m)	RS Sr	Our Lady of Lourdes; Virginia/Fordham	Miami, FL
G	1	Sasha Dailey	5 ft 8 in (1.73 m)	Sr	Rogers	Toledo, OH
G	2	Juanita Agosto	5 ft 6 in (1.68 m)	Fr	Garfield	Seattle, WA
F	3	Tori Easley	6 ft 1 in (1.85 m)	Sr	Rogers	Toledo, OH
G	5	Nailah Mitchell	5 ft 8 in (1.73 m)	So	Shaker Heights	Shaker Heights, OH
G	11	Esabelle Levine	5 ft 3 in (1.6 m)	So	Eden Prairie	Eden Prairie, MN
G	14	Courtnie Lewis	5 ft 10 in (1.78 m)	Fr	Belton	Belton, MO
G	20	Carrione Cardwell	5 ft 8 in (1.73 m)	RS Fr	New Tech East	Cleveland, OH
F	22	Autumn Hudson	6 ft 5 in (1.96 m)	Fr	North Union	Richwood, OH
G	23	Danielle Minott	5 ft 8 in (1.73 m)	RS Jr	Miami Country Day; Syracuse	Miami, FL
F	24	Emoni Jackson	6 ft 1 in (1.85 m)	RS Jr	Long Beach Polytechnic; Michigan	Los Angeles, CA
F	31	Lorraine Enabulene	6 ft 1 in (1.85 m)	RS Jr	Notre Dame Secondary School; Kansas	Ajax, ON
F	32	RayJon Harris	6 ft 1 in (1.85 m)	Fr	Euclid	Euclid, OH
G	42	Micah Robinson	5 ft 8 in (1.73 m)	Sr	Huron	Ann Arbor, MI

Head coach

- Fred Castro (Oklahoma)

Assistant coach(es)

- Adam Call (Oklahoma)
- Abi Olajuwon (Oklahoma)
- Cassandra Callaway (Daytona State)

Legend

- (C) Team captain
- (S) Suspended
- (I) Ineligible
- (W) Walk-on
- Injured
- Current redshirt

Roster
Last update: January 1, 2018

== Schedule ==
Date time, TV	Rank^{#}	Opponent^{#}	Result	Record	Site (attendance) city, state
Exhibition
11/01/2017*; 7:00 PM		Hillsdale	W 70–57		Convocation Center; Ypsilanti, MI
Non-conference regular season
11/10/2017*; 1:00 PM, ESPN3		Florida A&M	W 83–61	1–0	Convocation Center (4,767); Ypsilanti, MI
11/13/2017*; 7:00 PM, ESPN3		Rochester	W 62–29	2–0	Convocation Center (646); Ypsilanti, MI
11/16/2017*; 7:00 PM, ESPN3		at Cleveland State	L 65–77	2–1	Wolstein Center (228); Cleveland, OH
11/18/2017*; 1:30 PM		at St. Bonaventure	L 51–70	2–2	Reilly Center (924); Olean, NY
11/24/2017*; 4:00 PM		vs. Denver; LMU Thanksgiving Classic	L 54–60	2–3	Gersten Pavilion (280); Los Angeles, CA
11/25/2017*; 6:30 PM		at Loyola Marymount; LMU Thanksgiving Classic	L 64–73	2–4	Gersten Pavilion (431); Los Angeles, CA
12/03/2017*; 2:00 PM		at Minnesota	L 56–80	2–5	Williams Arena (2,694); Minneapolis, MN
12/08/2017*; 8:00 PM, ESPN3		at UIC	L 70–73	2–6	UIC Pavilion (397); Chicago, IL
12/10/2017*; 3:00 PM, ESPN3		at Illinois State	L 56–65	2–7	Redbird Arena (592); Normal, IL
12/17/2017*; 12:00 PM, ESPN3		at Detroit	W 78–76	3–7	Calihan Hall (289); Detroit, MI
12/20/2017*; 4:00 PM, ESPN3		Longwood	W 73–44	4–7	Convocation Center (844); Ypsilanti, MI
MAC regular season
12/30/2017; 2:00 PM, ESPN3		Kent State	L 60–67	4–8 (0–1)	Convocation Center (914); Ypsilanti, MI
01/03/2018; 7:00 PM, ESPN3		at Bowling Green	W 54–52	5–8 (1–1)	Stroh Center (1,152); Bowling Green, OH
01/06/2018; 2:30 PM, ESPN3		Toledo	W 70–57	6–8 (2–1)	Convocation Center (1,571); Ypsilanti, MI
01/10/2018; 7:00 PM, ESPN3		at Kent State	L 69–76	6–9 (2–2)	MAC Center (402); Kent, OH
01/13/2018; 2:00 PM, ESPN3		at Miami (OH)	W 74–59	7–9 (3–2)	Millett Hall (307); Oxford, OH
01/17/2018; 7:00 PM, ESPN3		Western Michigan	W 69–67 ^{OT}	8–9 (4–2)	Convocation Center (1,050); Ypsilanti, MI
01/20/2018; 2:00 PM, ESPN3		at Northern Illinois	W 83–76	9–9 (5–2)	Convocation Center (547); DeKalb, IL
01/24/2018; 7:00 PM, ESPN3		Miami (OH)	L 69–73	10–9 (5–3)	Convocation Center (399); Ypsilanti, MI
01/27/2018; 2:00 PM, ESPN3		at Buffalo	L 92–97 ^{OT}	10–10 (5–4)	Alumni Arena (1,630); Buffalo, NY
02/03/2018; 2:30 PM, ESPN3		Central Michigan	L 72–95	10–11 (5–5)	Convocation Center (2,520); Ypsilanti, MI
02/07/2018; 7:00 PM, ESPN3		at Ball State	L 85–91	10–12 (5–6)	Worthen Arena (1,398); Muncie, IN
02/11/2018; 2:00 PM, ESPN3		Akron	L 65–77	10–13 (5–7)	Convocation Center (933); Ypsilanti, MI
02/14/2018; 7:00 PM, ESPN3		Ohio	W 73–58	11–13 (6–7)	Convocation Center (1,033); Ypsilanti, MI
02/17/2018; 7:00 PM, ESPN3		at Central Michigan	L 82–95	10–15 (6–8)	McGuirk Arena (2,189); Mount Pleasant, MI
02/21/2018; 7:00 PM, ESPN3		at Toledo	L 69–80	10–16 (6–9)	Savage Arena (4,018); Toledo, OH
02/24/2018; 2:30 PM, ESPN3		Northern Illinois	L 75–84	10–17 (6–10)	Convocation Center (2,773); Ypsilanti, MI
02/28/2018; 7:00 PM, ESPN3		at Western Michigan	L 66–74	10–18 (6–11)	University Arena (659); Kalamazoo, MI
03/03/2018; 2:00 PM, ESPN3		Ball State	L 63–88	10–18 (6–12)	Convocation Center (1,370); Ypsilanti, MI
MAC Women's Tournament
03/05/2018; 6:00 pm, ESPN3	(9)	at (8) Northern Illinois; First Round	W 84–77	11–19	Convocation Center (294); DeKalb, IL
03/07/2018; 12:00 pm, ESPN3	(9)	vs. (1) Central Michigan; Quarterfinals	L 64–67	11–20	Quicken Loans Arena; Cleveland, OH
*Non-conference game. ^{#}Rankings from AP Poll. (#) Tournament seedings in parentheses. All times are in Eastern Time.

== See also ==
- 2017–18 Eastern Michigan Eagles men's basketball team
