= 2017–18 Toledo Rockets women's basketball team =

Intercollegiate basketball season

2017–18 Toledo Rockets women's basketball

WNIT, second round
- Conference: Mid-American Conference
- West Division
- Record: 18–15 (8–10 MAC)
- Head coach: Tricia Cullop (10th season)
- Assistant coaches: Vicki Hall; Tony Greene; Tiffany Swoffard
- Home arena: Savage Arena

2017–18 Mid-American Conference women's basketball standings
	Conf.				Overall
Team	W		L	PCT	W		L	PCT
East
Buffalo	16	–	2	.889	29	–	6	.829
Miami (OH)	12	–	6	.667	21	–	11	.656
Ohio	9	–	9	.500	16	–	15	.516
Kent State	5	–	13	.278	13	–	19	.406
Bowling Green	3	–	15	.167	11	–	19	.367
Akron	3	–	15	.167	9	–	21	.300
West
Central Michigan †	17	–	1	.944	30	–	5	.857
Ball State	13	–	5	.722	25	–	7	.781
Western Michigan	9	–	9	.500	18	–	15	.545
Toledo	8	–	10	.444	18	–	15	.545
Northern Illinois	7	–	11	.389	15	–	15	.500
Eastern Michigan	6	–	12	.333	11	–	20	.355
† 2018 MAC tournament winner As of March 24, 2018

The 2017–18 Toledo Rockets women's basketball team represented University of Toledo during the 2017–18 NCAA Division I women's basketball season. The Rockets, led by tenth year head coach Tricia Cullop, played their home games at Savage Arena, as members of the West Division of the Mid-American Conference. They finished the season 18–15, 8–10 in MAC play to finish in fourth place in the West Division. They lost in the first round of the MAC women's tournament to Kent State. They received an at-large bid to the Women's National Invitation Tournament, where they defeated Wright State in the first round before losing to Michigan State in the second round.

== Previous season ==
They finished the season 25–9, 12–6 in MAC play to finish in a tie for third place in the West Division. They defeated Kent State, Buffalo and Northern Illinois to win the MAC Tournament to earn an automatic trip to the NCAA women's tournament for the first time since 2001. They lost to Creighton in the first round.

== Roster ==
2017–18 Toledo Rockets women's basketball team
Players
Coaches

Pos.	#	Name	Height	Year	Previous school	Hometown
G	0	Olivia Cunningham	5 ft 7 in (1.7 m)	RS Jr	Horn Lake; Murray State	Horn Lake, MS
F	1	Sara Rokkanen	5 ft 10 in (1.78 m)	So	Mäkelänrinne	Helsinki, Finland
G	2	Mikaela Boyd	5 ft 7 in (1.7 m)	RS Jr	Proviso West	Hillside, IL
G	3	Mariella Santucci	5 ft 6 in (1.68 m)	So	Liceo Scientifico Sabin	Bologna, Italy
G/F	5	Sarah St-Fort	5 ft 10 in (1.78 m)	Jr	Dawson College	Montreal, Quebec
F	10	Merveilles Tshitenge	5 ft 10 in (1.78 m)	RS Jr	ESCC; Redlands CC	Neuchâtel, Switzerland
G	11	Jay-Ann Bravo-Harriott (C)	5 ft 10 in (1.78 m)	Sr	Greig City Academy	London, England
G	12	Tatyana Davis	5 ft 9 in (1.75 m)	Fr	Morgan County	Madison, GA
G	13	Mariah Copeland	5 ft 9 in (1.75 m)	Fr	Notre Dame Academy	Toledo, OH
F	14	Tyra Carlsten-Handberg (redshirt)	6 ft 4 in (1.93 m)	So	Bromma Gymnasium; UIC	Stockholm, Sweden
C	15	Kaayla McIntyre	6 ft 2 in (1.88 m)	Jr	Notre Dame Academy	Toledo, OH
F	23	Tanaya Beacham	6 ft 1 in (1.85 m)	RS Fr	Toledo Rogers	Youngstown, OH
F	24	Michaela Rasmussen	6 ft 1 in (1.85 m)	Sr	Holy Family	Chaska, MN
G	25	Zaria Wright	5 ft 8 in (1.73 m)	Fr	Concord First Assembly Academy	Concord, NC
G/F	35	Jada Woody	6 ft 1 in (1.85 m)	Sr	Plymouth	Canton, MI

Head coach

- Tricia Cullop (Purdue)

Assistant coach(es)

- Vicki Hall (Texas)
- Tony Greene (Langston)
- Tiffany Swoffard (Austin Peay)

Legend

- (C) Team captain
- (S) Suspended
- (I) Ineligible
- (W) Walk-on
- Injured
- Current redshirt

Roster
Last update: January 1, 2018

== Schedule ==
Date time, TV	Rank^{#}	Opponent^{#}	Result	Record	Site (attendance) city, state
Exhibition
11/04/2017*; 12:00 PM		Lock Haven	W 78–47		Savage Arena; Toledo, OH
Non-conference regular season
11/10/2017*; 7:00 PM, ESPN3		Saint Francis (PA); Preseason WNIT First Round	W 74–66	1–0	Savage Arena (3,740); Toledo, OH
11/14/2017*; 7:00 PM		at No. 5 Louisville; Preseason WNIT Second Round	L 55–90	1–1	KFC Yum! Center (7,444); Louisville, KY
11/18/2017*; 2:00 PM, ESPN3		Louisiana; Preseason WNIT consolation round	W 79–55	2–1	Savage Arena (593); Toledo, OH
11/22/2017*; 7:00 PM, ESPN3		Dayton	W 68–50	3–1	Savage Arena (3,347); Toledo, OH
11/27/2017*; 12:00 PM		at Iona	W 74–57	4–1	Hynes Athletic Center (311); New Rochelle, NY
11/30/2017*; 7:00 PM, ESPN3		Maine	W 65–64 ^{OT}	5–1	Savage Arena (3,208); Toledo, OH
12/04/2017*; 7:00 PM		at St. Bonaventure	W 59–38	6–1	Reilly Center (794); Olean, NY
12/06/2017*; 5:30 PM		at Duquesne	L 54–73	6–2	Palumbo Center (620); Pittsburgh, PA
12/09/2017*; 2:00 PM, ESPN3		Cleveland State	W 65–56	7–2	Savage Arena (3,631); Toledo, OH
12/17/2017*; 11:00 AM		vs. Western Kentucky; West Palm Invitational	L 56–70	7–3	Student Life Center (125); West Palm Beach, FL
12/18/2017*; 2:30 PM		vs. Southern; West Palm Invitational	W 81–76	8–3	Student Life Center (200); West Palm Beach, FL
12/21/2017*; 5:00 PM		at Detroit	W 81–64	9–3	Calihan Hall (307); Detroit, MI
MAC regular season
12/31/2017; 1:00 PM, ESPN3		at Ohio	L 61–78	9–4 (0–1)	Convocation Center (361); Athens, OH
01/03/2018; 7:00 PM, ESPN3		Akron	W 60–54	10–4 (1–1)	Savage Arena (3,392); Toledo, OH
01/06/2018; 2:30 PM, ESPN3		at Eastern Michigan	L 57–70	10–5 (1–2)	Convocation Center (1,571); Ypsilanti, MI
01/10/2018; 1:00 PM, ESPN3		Ohio	W 75–57	11–5 (2–2)	Savage Arena (3,229); Toledo, OH
01/13/2018; 2:00 PM, ESPN3		Northern Illinois	W 63–60	12–5 (3–2)	Savage Arena (3,716); Toledo, OH
01/17/2018; 7:00 PM, ESPN3		Ball State	W 72–66	13–5 (4–2)	Savage Arena (3,259); Toledo, OH
01/20/2018; 2:00 PM, ESPN3		at Buffalo	L 69–87	13–6 (4–3)	Alumni Arena (1,899); Buffalo, NY
01/24/2018; 7:00 PM, ESPN3		Kent State	L 55–62	13–7 (4–4)	Savage Arena (3,722); Toledo, OH
01/27/2018; 2:00 PM, ESPN3		at Bowling Green	W 77–67	14–7 (5–4)	Stroh Center (2,103); Bowling Green, OH
01/31/2018; 7:00 PM, ESPN3		at Western Michigan	W 78–73	15–7 (6–4)	University Arena (505); Kalamazoo, MI
02/03/2018; 2:00 PM, ESPN3		Buffalo	L 73–84	15–8 (6–5)	Savage Arena (4,613); Toledo, OH
02/07/2018; 7:00 PM, ESPN3		at Miami (OH)	L 58–67	15–9 (6–6)	Millett Hall (328); Oxford, OH
02/10/2018; 1:00 PM, ESPN3		at Central Michigan	L 47–85	15–10 (6–7)	McGuirk Arena (1,888); Mount Pleasant, MI
02/17/2018; 2:00 PM, ESPN3		Western Michigan	W 69–68	16–10 (7–7)	Savage Arena (5,024); Toledo, OH
02/21/2018; 7:00 PM, ESPN3		Eastern Michigan	W 80–69	17–10 (8–7)	Savage Arena (4,018); Toledo, OH
02/24/2018; 2:00 PM, ESPN3		at Ball State	L 73–78	17–11 (8–8)	Worthen Arena (2,822); Muncie, IN
02/28/2018; 7:00 PM, ESPN3		at Northern Illinois	L 79–89	17–12 (8–9)	Convocation Center (463); DeKalb, IL
03/03/2018; 2:00 PM, ESPN3		Central Michigan	L 67–72	17–13 (8–10)	Savage Arena (4,837); Toledo, OH
MAC Women's Tournament
03/05/2018; 7:00 pm, ESPN3	(7)	(10) Kent State; First Round	L 76–80 ^{OT}	17–14	Savage Arena (3,157); Toledo, OH
WNIT
03/16/2018*; 7:00 pm, ESPN3		Wright State; First Round	W 64–50	18–14	Savage Arena (1,236); Toledo, OH
03/19/2018*; 7:00 pm		at Michigan State; Second Round	L 66–68	18–15	Breslin Center (2,144); East Lansing, MI
*Non-conference game. ^{#}Rankings from AP Poll. (#) Tournament seedings in parentheses. All times are in Eastern Time.

== See also ==
- 2017–18 Toledo Rockets men's basketball team
