= 2017–18 Purdue Boilermakers women's basketball team =

Intercollegiate basketball season

2017–18 Purdue Boilermakers women's basketball

WNIT, Third Round
- Conference: Big Ten Conference
- Record: 20–14 (9–7 Big Ten)
- Head coach: Sharon Versyp (12th season)
- Assistant coaches: Nadine Morgan; Beth Couture; Lindsay Wisdom-Hylton
- Home arena: Mackey Arena

2017–18 Big Ten women's basketball standings
	Conf.				Overall
Team	W		L	PCT	W		L	PCT
No. 10 Ohio State †	13	–	3	.813	28	–	7	.800
No. 16 Maryland	12	–	4	.750	26	–	8	.765
Iowa	11	–	5	.688	24	–	8	.750
Minnesota	11	–	5	.688	24	–	9	.727
Nebraska	11	–	5	.688	21	–	11	.656
Michigan	10	–	6	.625	23	–	10	.697
Indiana	9	–	7	.563	23	–	14	.622
Purdue	9	–	7	.563	20	–	14	.588
Rutgers	7	–	9	.438	20	–	12	.625
Michigan State	7	–	9	.438	19	–	14	.576
Penn State	6	–	10	.375	16	–	16	.500
Northwestern	4	–	12	.250	12	–	20	.375
Wisconsin	2	–	14	.125	9	–	21	.300
Illinois	0	–	16	.000	9	–	21	.300
† 2018 Big Ten tournament winner Rankings from AP poll

The 2017–18 Purdue Boilermakers women's basketball team represented Purdue University during the 2017–18 NCAA Division I women's basketball season. The Boilermakers, led by 12th-year head coach Sharon Versyp, played their home games at Mackey Arena and were members of the Big Ten Conference. They finished the season 20–14, 9–7 in Big Ten play to finish in tie for seventh place. They lost in the second round of the Big Ten women's tournament to Rutgers. They received an at-large bid to the Women's National Invitation Tournament, where they defeated IUPUI and Ball State in the first and second rounds before losing to Big Ten member and their rival Indiana in the third round.

== Roster ==
2017–18 Purdue Boilermakers women's basketball team
Players
Coaches

Pos.	#	Name	Height	Year	Previous school	Hometown
G	1	Karissa McLaughlin	5 ft 7 in (1.7 m)	Fr	Homestead	Fort Wayne, IN
G	2	Abby Abel	5 ft 5 in (1.65 m)	Jr	Carmel	Carmel, IN
G	3	Tiara Murphy	5 ft 7 in (1.7 m)	RS So	Washington	South Bend, IN
G	5	Miracle Gray	5 ft 6 in (1.68 m)	So	Stephenson	Stone Mountain, GA
G	10	Andreona Keys	5 ft 10 in (1.78 m)	Sr	Roswell	Atlanta, GA
G	11	Dominique Oden	5 ft 8 in (1.73 m)	So	Marist	Atlanta, GA
C	12	Nora Kiesler	6 ft 6 in (1.98 m)	Jr	Assumption	Louisville, KY
G	15	Léony Boudreau	5 ft 10 in (1.78 m)	Fr	Dawson College	Montreal, Quebec
F	22	Dani Lawson	6 ft 2 in (1.88 m)	Fr	Hathaway Brown	Cleveland, OH
G	25	Tamara Farquhar	6 ft 0 in (1.83 m)	Fr	Dawson College	Pierrefonds, Quebec
F	32	Ae'Rianna Harris	6 ft 1 in (1.85 m)	So	Lawrence North	Indianapolis, IN
G	40	Lamina Cooper	5 ft 9 in (1.75 m)	So	Lawrence North	Indianapolis, IN
C	45	Fatou Diagne	6 ft 4 in (1.93 m)	RS So	Kocc Barma	Thiès, Senegal

Head coach

- Sharon Versyp (Purdue)

Assistant coach(es)

- Nadine Morgan (James Madison)
- Beth Couture (Erskine)
- Lindsay Wisdom-Hylton (Purdue)

Legend

- (C) Team captain
- (S) Suspended
- (I) Ineligible
- (W) Walk-on
- Injured
- Current redshirt

Roster
Last update: Nov 28, 2017

== Schedule ==
Date time, TV	Rank^{#}	Opponent^{#}	Result	Record	Site (attendance) city, state
Exhibition
Nov 5, 2017*; 2:00 pm		St. Francis (IL)	W 88–39		Mackey Arena (5,774); West Lafayette, IN
Non-conference regular season
Nov 10, 2017*; 7:30 pm, ESPN3		at Central Michigan	W 79–69	1–0	McGuirk Arena (2,035); Mount Pleasant, MI
Nov 15, 2017*; 7:00 pm		Miami (OH)	W 75–66	2–0	Mackey Arena (5,610); West Lafayette, IN
Nov 18, 2017*; 1:00 pm		Lamar	W 79–64	3–0	Mackey Arena (5,579); West Lafayette, IN
Nov 20, 2017*; 9:00 pm, P12N		at Utah	L 68–81	3–1	Jon M. Huntsman Center (1,887); Salt Lake City, UT
Nov 24, 2017*; 8:00 pm		vs. USC; Rainbow Wahine Classic	L 46–58	3–2	Stan Sheriff Center (N/A); Honolulu, HI
Nov 25, 2017*; 10:30 pm		at Hawaii; Rainbow Wahine Classic	W 79–67	4–2	Stan Sheriff Center (1,366); Honolulu, HI
Nov 26, 2017*; 7:30 pm		vs. Marist; Rainbow Wahine Classic	W 61–47	5–2	Stan Sheriff Center (N/A); Honolulu, HI
Nov 30, 2017*; 7:00 pm, ACCN Extra		at Georgia Tech; ACC–Big Ten Women's Challenge	L 55–68	5–3	McCamish Pavilion (1,201); Atlanta, GA
Dec 4, 2017*; 7:00 pm		Ball State	L 60–66	5–4	Mackey Arena (6,068); West Lafayette, IN
Dec 8, 2017*; 7:00 pm		Valparaiso	W 95–49	6–4	Mackey Arena (5,534); West Lafayette, IN
Dec 10, 2017*; 2:00 pm, BTN		Ohio	L 71–77	6–5	Mackey Arena (5,654); West Lafayette, IN
Dec 17, 2017*; 12:00 pm, BTN		Eastern Washington; Basketball Travelers Inc. Invitational	W 65–40	7–5	Mackey Arena (6,193); West Lafayette, IN
Dec 18, 2017*; 6:30 pm		UT Martin; Basketball Travelers Inc. Invitational	W 60–58	8–5	Mackey Arena (5,387); West Lafayette, IN
Dec 20, 2017*; 1:30 pm		Saint Mary's; Basketball Travelers Inc. Invitational	W 70–60	9–5	Mackey Arena (6,510); West Lafayette, IN
Big Ten conference season
Dec 28, 2017; 2:00 pm		at Rutgers	L 50–58	9–6 (0–1)	Louis Brown Athletic Center (1,827); Piscataway, NJ
Dec 31, 2017; 2:00 pm		Wisconsin	W 57–35	10–6 (1–1)	Mackey Arena (6,218); West Lafayette, IN
Jan 6, 2018; 2:00 pm		at Indiana; Rivalry/Crimson and Gold Cup	L 54–72	10–7 (1–2)	Simon Skjodt Assembly Hall (4,768); Bloomington, IN
Jan 10, 2018; 7:00 pm		No. 21 Rutgers	W 47–33	11–7 (2–2)	Mackey Arena (5,774); West Lafayette, IN
Jan 13, 2018; 4:00 pm, BTN		at No. 18 Iowa	W 76–70	12–7 (3–2)	Carver–Hawkeye Arena (7,477); Iowa City, IA
Jan 18, 2018; 7:00 pm		Northwestern	W 63–60	13–7 (4–2)	Mackey Arena (5,795); West Lafayette, IN
Jan 24, 2018; 8:00 pm		at Nebraska	L 51–75	13–8 (4–3)	Pinnacle Bank Arena (4,167); Lincoln, NE
Jan 28, 2018; 12:00 pm, BTN		Penn State	W 88–73	14–8 (5–3)	Mackey Arena (6,970); West Lafayette, IN
Feb 1, 2018; 8:00 pm, BTN		at No. 13 Michigan	W 81–79 ^{OT}	15–8 (6–3)	Crisler Center (2,281); Ann Arbor, MI
Feb 4, 2018; 2:00 pm, BTN		at Illinois	W 73–54	16–8 (7–3)	State Farm Center (1,902); Champaign, IL
Feb 8, 2018; 7:00 pm		Minnesota	L 74–78	16–9 (7–4)	Mackey Arena (5,827); West Lafayette, IN
Feb 12, 2018; 7:00 pm, BTN		Indiana; Rivalry/Crimson and Gold Cup	L 44–52	16–10 (7–5)	Mackey Arena (7,054); West Lafayette, IN
Feb 15, 2018; 6:00 pm, BTN		at No. 10 Maryland	W 75–65	17–10 (8–5)	Xfinity Center (4,521); College Park, MD
Feb 18, 2018; 1:00 pm, ESPN2		at No. 16 Ohio State	L 60–73	17–11 (8–6)	Value City Arena (8,081); Columbus, OH
Feb 21, 2018; 7:00 pm		Illinois	W 64–51	18–11 (9–6)	Mackey Arena (5,655); West Lafayette, IN
Feb 24, 2018; 2:00 pm, BTN		Michigan State	L 68–82	18–12 (9–7)	Mackey Arena (6,800); West Lafayette, IN
Big Ten Women's Tournament
Mar 1, 2018; 12:00 pm, RSN	(8)	vs. (9) Rutgers; Second Round	L 60–62	18–13	Bankers Life Fieldhouse; Indianapolis, IN
WNIT
Mar 15, 2018*; 7:00 pm		at IUPUI; First Round	W 48–46	19–13	The Jungle (488); Indianapolis, IN
Mar 18, 2018*; 2:00 pm		at Ball State; Second Round	W 77–72	20–13	Worthen Arena (1,307); Muncie, IN
Mar 22, 2018*; 7:00 pm		at Indiana; Third Round/Rivalry	L 51–73	20–14	Simon Skjodt Assembly Hall (5,564); Bloomington, IN
*Non-conference game. ^{#}Rankings from AP Poll. (#) Tournament seedings in parentheses. All times are in Eastern Time.

== Rankings ==
Regular season polls
Poll	Pre- season	Week 2	Week 3	Week 4	Week 5	Week 6	Week 7	Week 8	Week 9	Week 10	Week 11	Week 12	Week 13	Week 14	Week 15	Week 16	Week 17	Week 18	Week 19	Final
AP	NR	NR	NR	NR	NR	NR	NR	NR	NR	NR	NR	NR	NR	NR	NR	NR	NR	NR		N/A
Coaches	NR	N/A	NR	NR	NR	NR	NR	NR	NR	NR	NR	RV	NR	NR	NR	RV	RV	NR		

Legend
	Increase in ranking
	Decrease in ranking
	Not ranked previous week
(RV)	Received votes

== See also ==
- 2017–18 Purdue Boilermakers men's basketball team
