= 2017–18 Miami RedHawks women's basketball team =

Intercollegiate basketball season

2017–18 Miami RedHawks women's basketball

WNIT, First Round
- Conference: Mid-American Conference
- East Division
- Record: 21–11 (12–6 MAC)
- Head coach: Megan Duffy (1st season)
- Assistant coaches: Frank Goldsberry; Ke'Sha Blanton; Michaela Mabrey
- Home arena: Millett Hall

2017–18 Mid-American Conference women's basketball standings
	Conf.				Overall
Team	W		L	PCT	W		L	PCT
East
Buffalo	16	–	2	.889	29	–	6	.829
Miami (OH)	12	–	6	.667	21	–	11	.656
Ohio	9	–	9	.500	16	–	15	.516
Kent State	5	–	13	.278	13	–	19	.406
Bowling Green	3	–	15	.167	11	–	19	.367
Akron	3	–	15	.167	9	–	21	.300
West
Central Michigan †	17	–	1	.944	30	–	5	.857
Ball State	13	–	5	.722	25	–	7	.781
Western Michigan	9	–	9	.500	18	–	15	.545
Toledo	8	–	10	.444	18	–	15	.545
Northern Illinois	7	–	11	.389	15	–	15	.500
Eastern Michigan	6	–	12	.333	11	–	20	.355
† 2018 MAC tournament winner As of March 24, 2018

The 2017–18 Miami RedHawks women's basketball team represented Miami University during the 2017–18 NCAA Division I women's basketball season. The RedHawks, led by first year head coach Megan Duffy, played their home games at Millett Hall, as members of the East Division of the Mid-American Conference. They finished the season 21–11, 12–6 in MAC play to finish in second place in the East Division. They advanced to the semifinals of the MAC women's tournament, where they lost to Central Michigan. They received an at-large bid to the Women's National Invitation Tournament, where they lost to Duquesne in the first round.

== Roster ==
2017–18 Miami RedHawks women's basketball team
Players
Coaches

Pos.	#	Name	Height	Year	Previous school	Hometown
G	4	Nanci Hunter	5 ft 0 in (1.52 m)	Jr	Sycamore	Cincinnati, OH
F	10	Kristen Levering	6 ft 2 in (1.88 m)	Jr	Olentangy Liberty	Powell, OH
G	13	Lauren Dickerson	5 ft 3 in (1.6 m)	So	Lawrence North	Indianapolis, IN
G	15	Kayla Brown	6 ft 2 in (1.88 m)	Sr	Westfield	Westfield, IN
G	21	Leah Purvis	5 ft 6 in (1.68 m)	Jr	The Buckley School	Los Angeles, CA
G	22	Jazz Smith	5 ft 8 in (1.73 m)	Sr	Rogers	Toledo, OH
G	23	Kenzie Schmitz	5 ft 10 in (1.78 m)	Fr	Germantown	Germantown, WI
G	24	Baleigh Reid	5 ft 10 in (1.78 m)	RS Jr	Twinsburg	Twinsburg, OH
G/F	25	Molly McDonagh	6 ft 0 in (1.83 m)	Sr	Glenbrook South	Glenview, IL
F	32	Savannah Kluesner	6 ft 2 in (1.88 m)	So	Lutheran	St. Charles, MO
F	34	Megan Galloway	6 ft 2 in (1.88 m)	RS Sr	Greenville	Greenville, OH
G/F	35	Abbey Hoff	6 ft 0 in (1.83 m)	So	Incarnate Word Academy	St. Peters, MO
G/F	40	Kendall McCoy	6 ft 0 in (1.83 m)	Jr	Sylvania Northview	Sylvania, OH
F	54	Kelly McLaughlin	6 ft 3 in (1.91 m)	Fr	St. Joseph's Academy	St. Louis, MO

Head coach

- Megan Duffy (Notre Dame)

Assistant coach(es)

- Frank Goldsberry (Ball State)
- Ke'Sha Blanton (Toledo)
- Michaela Mabrey (Notre Dame)

Legend

- (C) Team captain
- (S) Suspended
- (I) Ineligible
- (W) Walk-on
- Injured
- Current redshirt

Roster
Last update: December 30, 2017

== Schedule ==
Date time, TV	Rank^{#}	Opponent^{#}	Result	Record	Site (attendance) city, state
Exhibition
11/02/2017*; 7:00 PM		Central State	W 91–45		Millett Hall; Oxford, OH
Non-conference regular season
11/10/2017*; 2:00 PM, ESPN3		Detroit	W 91–64	1–0	Millett Hall (1,678); Oxford, OH
11/15/2017*; 7:00 PM		at Purdue	L 66–75	1–1	Mackey Arena (5,610); West Lafayette, IN
11/18/2017*; 2:00 PM		at Cincinnati	L 62–73	1–2	Saint Ursula Academy Gym (500); Cincinnati, OH
11/21/2017*; 12:00 PM, ESPN3		Valparaiso	W 77–68	2–2	Millett Hall (1,037); Oxford, OH
11/24/2017*; 6:30 PM		at Loyola Marymount; LMU Thanksgiving Classic	L 71–84	2–3	Gersten Pavilion (351); Los Angeles, CA
11/25/2017*; 4:00 PM		vs. Denver; LMU Thanksgiving Classic	W 69–52	3–3	Gersten Pavilion (215); Los Angeles, CA
12/03/2017*; 2:00 PM, ESPN3		Canisius	W 72–47	4–3	Millett Hall (355); Oxford, OH
12/06/2017*; 7:00 PM, ESPN3		at IUPUI	W 96–83 ^{OT}	5–3	The Jungle (507); Indianapolis, IN
12/09/2017*; 3:30 PM, ESPN3		Jacksonville State	W 58–55	6–3	Millett Hall (213); Oxford, OH
12/19/2017*; 7:00 PM, ESPN3		at Indiana State	W 68–56	7–3	Hulman Center (1,295); Terre Haute, IN
12/21/2017*; 7:00 PM, ESPN3		Florida A&M	W 73–33	8–3	Millett Hall (245); Oxford, OH
MAC regular season
12/30/2017; 1:00 PM, ESPN3		Northern Illinois	W 67–65	9–3 (1–0)	Millett Hall; Oxford, OH
01/03/2018; 7:00 PM, ESPN3		at Ball State	L 61–86	9–4 (1–1)	Worthen Arena (1,111); Muncie, IN
01/06/2018; 1:00 PM, ESPN3		Central Michigan	L 66–84	9–5 (1–2)	Millett Hall (1,003); Oxford, OH
01/10/2018; 7:00 PM		at Buffalo	L 67–72	9–6 (1–3)	Alumni Arena (1,032); Buffalo, NY
01/13/2018; 2:00 PM, ESPN3		Eastern Michigan	L 59–74	9–7 (1–4)	Millett Hall (307); Oxford, OH
01/17/2018; 7:00 PM, ESPN3		Akron	W 75–67	10–7 (2–4)	Millett Hall (256); Oxford, OH
01/20/2018; 2:00 PM, ESPN3		at Western Michigan	L 70–81	10–8 (2–5)	University Arena (737); Kalamazoo, MI
01/24/2018; 7:00 PM, ESPN3		at Eastern Michigan	W 73–69	11–8 (3–5)	Convocation Center (399); Ypsilanti, MI
01/27/2018; 1:00 PM, ESPN3		Ohio	W 64–55	12–8 (4–5)	Millett Hall (737); Oxford, OH
01/31/2018; 7:00 PM, ESPN3		at Northern Illinois	W 77–62	13–8 (5–5)	Convocation Center (457); DeKalb, IL
02/03/2018; 1:00 PM, ESPN3		at Bowling Green	W 66–62	14–8 (6–5)	Stroh Center (737); Bowling Green, OH
02/07/2018; 7:00 PM, ESPN3		Toledo	W 67–58	15–8 (7–5)	Millett Hall (328); Oxford, OH
02/10/2018; 1:00 PM		Buffalo	L 49–64	15–9 (7–6)	Millett Hall (1,507); Oxford, OH
02/17/2018; 4:30 PM, ESPN3		at Kent State	W 65–59	16–9 (8–6)	MAC Center (6,055); Kent, OH
02/21/2018; 7:00 PM, ESPN3		at Akron	W 77–50	17–9 (9–6)	James A. Rhodes Arena (553); Akron, OH
02/24/2018; 2:00 PM, ESPN3		Bowling Green	W 92–64	18–9 (10–6)	Millett Hall (589); Oxford, OH
02/28/2018; 2:00 PM, ESPN3		at Ohio	W 78–56	19–9 (11–6)	Convocation Center (328); Kalamazoo, MI
03/03/2018; 1:00 PM, ESPN3		Kent State	W 58–35	20–9 (12–6)	Millett Hall (527); Oxford, OH
MAC Women's Tournament
03/07/2018; 2:30 pm, ESPN3	(4)	vs. (5) Ohio; Quarterfinals	W 69–66	21–9	Quicken Loans Arena; Cleveland, OH
03/09/2018; 11:00 am, ESPN3	(4)	vs. (1) Central Michigan; Semifinals	L 58–61	21–10	Quicken Loans Arena; Cleveland, OH
WNIT
03/15/2018*; 7:00 pm, ESPN3		Duquesne; First Round	L 56–69	21–11	Millett Hall (510); Oxford, OH
*Non-conference game. ^{#}Rankings from AP Poll. (#) Tournament seedings in parentheses. All times are in Eastern Time.

== See also ==
2017–18 Miami RedHawks men's basketball team
