= Jennifer Roos =

American basketball coach

Biographical details
- Born: July 17, 1971 (age 55)

Playing career
- 1992–1993: Davidson

Coaching career (HC unless noted)
- 1993–2001: Davidson (asst.)
- 2001–2004: Bowling Green (asst.)
- 2004–2012: Bowling Green (assoc. HC)
- 2012–2018: Bowling Green

Head coaching record
- Overall: 92–97 (.487)

Jennifer Roos (born July 17, 1971) was the head women's basketball coach for the Bowling Green Falcons women's basketball team from 2012 through 2018.

== Early life ==
Roos is from Louisville, Kentucky. She played basketball, field hockey, and lacrosse for Davidson. She earned her degree in history from Davidson College in 1993.

== Coaching career ==
Early in her career Roos was an assistant at Davidson. Roos was a long time assistant at Bowling Green under Curt Miller from 2001 through 2012. Miller's teams were very successful winning eight MAC titles. On April 16, 2012, she was named Bowling Green's head coach when Miller accepted the head coach position at Indiana. Her initial teams were successful. Bowling Green won 24 games in 2012–13. In her second season in 2013–14 the Falcons won 30 games and won the MAC regular season title and she was MAC coach of the year. Her later teams were not as successful. She was fired by BGSU on March 8, 2018.

== Head coaching record ==
Record table
| Season | Team | Overall | Conference | Standing | Postseason |
|---|---|---|---|---|---|
Bowling Green (Mid-American Conference) (2012–2018)
| 2012–13 | Bowling Green | 24–11 | 11–5 | 2nd (East) | WNIT Third Round |
| 2013–14 | Bowling Green | 30–5 | 17–1 | 1st (East) | WNIT Quarterfinals |
| 2014–15 | Bowling Green | 9–21 | 2–16 | 6th (East) | |
| 2015–16 | Bowling Green | 10–18 | 6–12 | 4th (East) | |
| 2016–17 | Bowling Green | 8–23 | 4–14 | 5th (East) | |
| 2017–18 | Bowling Green | 11–19 | 3–15 | 5th (East) | |
| Bowling Green: | | 92–97 (.487) | 43–63 (.406) | | |
| Total: | | 92–97 (.487) | | | |
National champion Postseason invitational champion Conference regular season champion Conference regular season and conference tournament champion Division regular season champion Division regular season and conference tournament champion Conference tournament champion
