= Sue Guevara =

American basketball coach

Biographical details
- Born: July 8, 1954 (age 72); Saginaw, Michigan, U.S.

Playing career
- 1974–1975: Saginaw Valley State

Coaching career (HC unless noted)

Women's basketball
- 1979–1984: Saginaw Valley State (asst.)
- 1984–1985: Ohio State (grad. asst.)
- 1985–1986: Ball State (asst.)
- 1986–1995: Michigan State (asst.)
- 1995–1996: Michigan State (assoc. HC)
- 1996–2003: Michigan
- 2004–2007: Auburn (asst.)
- 2007–2019: Central Michigan

Softball
- 1982–1984: Saginaw Valley State

Head coaching record
- Overall: 326–230 (.586) (basketball); 56–33 (softball)
- Tournaments: 3–5 (NCAA); 1–7 (WNIT)

Accomplishments and honors

Championships
- 2× MAC tournament (2013, 2018); 3× MAC West Division (2014, 2016, 2018)

Susan Marie Guevara (born July 8, 1954) is the former head women's basketball coach at Central Michigan University. She previously served as the head women's basketball coach at the University of Michigan from 1996 to 2003. Sue announced her retirement from CMU on July 12, 2019.

== Coaching career ==
Guevara began her coaching career as an assistant at Saginaw Valley State in 1979. After five seasons, she became a graduate assistant at Ohio State in 1984, become becoming an assistant coach at Ball State in 1985. Guevara spent a decade as an assistant coach at Michigan State under Karen Langeland, including as associate head coach in the 1995–96 season.

In 1996, Guevara became a head coach for the first time at Michigan. Inheriting a program whose winning percentage in the past four years was under .200, Guevara led Michigan to four consecutive postseason tournament berths, which had never occurred in program history. Guevara earned two Big Ten Coach of the Year honors (1998 and 2000).

She also coached at Auburn University from 2004 to 2007, under Nell Fortner.

In April 2007, Central Michigan hired Guevara as head coach.

=== Lawsuit ===
In 2009, she was named as a defendant in a lawsuit brought by Brooke Heike, a former player who lost her scholarship after the 2007–08 season. On May 3, 2010, all of Heike's claims against Coach Guevara and Central Michigan University were dismissed as lacking merit.

== Head coaching record ==
=== Softball ===
Record table
Season	Team	Overall	Conference	Standing	Postseason
Saginaw Valley State Cardinals (Great Lakes Intercollegiate Athletic Conference) (1982–1984)
1982	Saginaw Valley State	19–14	3–7	5th	
1983	Saginaw Valley State	17–10	7–5	T–3rd	
1984	Saginaw Valley State	20–9	9–1	1st	
Saginaw Valley State:		56–33	19–13		
Total:		56–33			
National champion Postseason invitational champion Conference regular season champion Conference regular season and conference tournament champion Division regular season champion Division regular season and conference tournament champion Conference tournament champion

=== Basketball ===
Record table
Season	Team	Overall	Conference	Standing	Postseason
Michigan Wolverines (Big Ten Conference) (1996–2003)
1996–97	Michigan	15–11	7–9	T–8th	
1997–98	Michigan	19–10	10–6	T–3rd	NCAA First Round
1998–99	Michigan	18–12	8–8	T–6th	WNIT Second Round
1999–2000	Michigan	22–8	13–3	2nd	NCAA First Round
2000–01	Michigan	19–12	10–6	5th	NCAA Second Round
2001–02	Michigan	17–13	6–10	T–9th	WNIT First Round
2002–03	Michigan	13–16	3–13	T–10th	
Michigan:		123–82	57–55		
Central Michigan Chippewas (Mid-American Conference) (2007–2019)
2007–08	Central Michigan	6–23	2–13	6th (West)	
2008–09	Central Michigan	18–14	9–7	4th (West)	
2009–10	Central Michigan	12–18	8–8	3rd (West)	
2010–11	Central Michigan	20–11	11–5	2nd (West)	WNIT First Round
2011–12	Central Michigan	20–16	8–8	3rd (West)	WNIT First Round
2012–13	Central Michigan	21–12	12–4	T–2nd (West)	NCAA First Round
2013–14	Central Michigan	20–12	16–2	1st (West)	WNIT First Round
2014–15	Central Michigan	13–18	7–11	6th (West)	
2015–16	Central Michigan	22–11	14–4	1st (West)	WNIT First Round
2016–17	Central Michigan	23–9	15–3	1st (West)	WNIT First Round
2017–18	Central Michigan	30–5	17–1	1st (West)	NCAA Sweet Sixteen
2018–19	Central Michigan	20–6	11–3	1st (West)	NCAA First Round
Central Michigan:		215–151 (.587)	104–65 (.615)		
Total:		337–232 (.592)			
National champion Postseason invitational champion Conference regular season champion Conference regular season and conference tournament champion Division regular season champion Division regular season and conference tournament champion Conference tournament champion
