= 2017–18 Evansville Purple Aces women's basketball team =

Intercollegiate basketball season

2017–18 Evansville Purple Aces women's basketball
- Conference: Missouri Valley Conference
- Record: 3–27 (0–18 The Valley)
- Head coach: Matt Ruffing (2nd season)
- Assistant coaches: Doug Rogers; Jauwan Scaife; Kaitlynn Pacholke
- Home arena: Meeks Family Fieldhouse

2017–18 Missouri Valley Conference women's basketball standings
	Conf.				Overall
Team	W		L	PCT	W		L	PCT
Drake †	18	–	0	1.000	26	–	8	.765
Missouri State	15	–	3	.833	21	–	12	.636
Northern Iowa	13	–	5	.722	19	–	14	.576
Southern Illinois	11	–	7	.611	17	–	14	.548
Indiana State	9	–	9	.500	11	–	19	.367
Illinois State	8	–	10	.444	14	–	16	.467
Bradley	6	–	12	.333	13	–	18	.419
Valparaiso	5	–	13	.278	13	–	18	.419
Loyola–Chicago	5	–	13	.278	7	–	23	.233
Evansville	0	–	18	.000	3	–	27	.100
† 2018 MVC tournament winner As of March 17, 2018

The 2017–18 Evansville Purple Aces women's basketball team represented the University of Evansville during the 2017–18 NCAA Division I women's basketball season. The Purple Aces, led by second year head coach Matt Ruffing, played their home games at Meeks Family Fieldhouse and were members of the Missouri Valley Conference. They finished the season 3–27, 0–18 in MVC play to finish in last place. They lost in the first round of the Missouri Valley women's tournament to Bradley.

== Previous season ==
They finished the season 14–17, 8–10 in MVC play to finish in sixth place. They advanced to the semifinals of the Missouri Valley women's tournament where they lost to Northern Iowa.

== Roster ==
2017–18 Evansville Purple Aces women's basketball team
Players
Coaches

Pos.	#	Name	Height	Year	Previous school	Hometown
G	1	Macie Lively	5 ft 7 in (1.7 m)	So	Tipton	Tipton, IN
F	2	Kerri Gasper	5 ft 11 in (1.8 m)	Jr	Olmstead Falls	Olmsted Township, OH
G	3	Marley Miller	5 ft 7 in (1.7 m)	RS So	East Richland; Vincennes University	Olney, IL
G	10	Hannah Noe	5 ft 9 in (1.75 m)	Sr	Dexter; Southeast Missouri State	Dexter, MO
G	11	Brooke Dossett	5 ft 6 in (1.68 m)	Sr	Gallatin; Vincennes University	Warsaw, KY
G	12	Monica Watkins	5 ft 8 in (1.73 m)	Fr	Liberty Christian School	Anderson, IN
G	20	Kadie Dearing	5 ft 9 in (1.75 m)	So	Southridge; Wabash Valley College	Huntingburg, IN
G	20	Katelyn Hedinger (W)	5 ft 8 in (1.73 m)	So	Japser	Jasper, IN
F	31	Tattenai Hall	6 ft 0 in (1.83 m)	Jr	Heritage	Fort Wayne, IN
G	32	Kayla Casteel	5 ft 9 in (1.75 m)	Fr	Plainfield	Indianapolis, IN
G	33	Crimson Jones	5 ft 11 in (1.8 m)	So	Flora; Wabash Valley College	Flora, IL
F	40	Elizabeth Jones	5 ft 10 in (1.78 m)	Sr	Washington Catholic	Washington, IN
C	42	Kaylan Coffman	6 ft 3 in (1.91 m)	So	Benton Central	Templeton, IN
C	44	Kelsi Scott	6 ft 3 in (1.91 m)	Jr	Silver Creek; Olney Central College	Sellersburg, IN

Head coach

- Matt Ruffing (Dayton)

Assistant coach(es)

- Doug Rogers (Wisconsin)
- Jauwan Scaife (Ball State)
- Kaitlynn Pacholke (Newberry)

Legend

- (C) Team captain
- (S) Suspended
- (I) Ineligible
- (W) Walk-on
- Injured
- Current redshirt

Roster
Last update: January 3, 2018

== Schedule ==
Date time, TV	Rank^{#}	Opponent^{#}	Result	Record	Site (attendance) city, state
Non-conference regular season
11/12/2017*; 1:00 pm, ESPN3		Murray State	W 89–81	1–0	Meeks Family Fieldhouse (721); Evansville, IN
11/15/2017*; 6:00 pm		at Alabama A&M	L 56–70	1–1	Elmore Gymnasium (827); Huntsville, AL
11/18/2017*; 1:00 pm		at Eastern Illinois	L 52–79	1–2	Lantz Arena (340); Charleston, IL
11/21/2017*; 7:00 pm, ESPN3		Westminster (MO)	W 79–53	2–2	Meeks Family Fieldhouse (317); Evansville, IN
11/30/2017*; 7:00 pm		at Western Kentucky	L 54–92	2–3	E. A. Diddle Arena (1,078); Bowling Green, KY
12/02/2017*; 1:00 pm		at Austin Peay	L 73–82	2–4	Dunn Center (485); Clarksville, TN
12/10/2017*; 1:00 pm		at Kentucky	L 62–100	2–5	Memorial Coliseum (4,071); Lexington, KY
12/10/2017*; 1:00 pm, ESPN3		Morehead State	L 75–82	2–6	Meeks Family Fieldhouse (357); Evansville, IN
12/14/2017*; 7:00 pm, ESPN3		Oakland City	W 96–59	3–6	Meeks Family Fieldhouse (286); Evansville, IN
12/16/2017*; 3:00 pm		at UIC	L 62–74	3–7	Flames Athletic Center (154); Chicago, IL
12/19/2017*; 1:00 pm		at Southeast Missouri State	L 65–74	3–8	Show Me Center (425); Cape Girardeau, MO
Missouri Valley regular season
12/29/2017; 7:00 pm, ESPN3		Southern Illinois	L 62–74	3–9 (0–1)	Meeks Family Fieldhouse (324); Evansville, IN
12/31/2017; 1:00 pm, ESPN3		Missouri State	L 65–95	3–10 (0–2)	Meeks Family Fieldhouse (332); Evansville, IN
01/05/2018; 6:00 pm, ESPN3		at Indiana State	L 48–56	3–11 (0–3)	Hulman Center (1,529); Terre Haute, IN
01/12/2018; 7:00 pm, ESPN3		at Northern Iowa	L 41–65	3–12 (0–4)	McLeod Center (1,596); Cedar Falls, IA
01/14/2018; 2:00 pm, ESPN3		at Drake	L 67–107	3–13 (0–5)	Knapp Center (2,520); Des Moines, IA
01/19/2018; 7:00 pm, ESPN3		Illinois State	L 43–67	3–14 (0–6)	Meeks Family Fieldhouse (447); Evansville, IN
01/21/2018; 1:00 pm, ESPN3		Bradley	L 59–117	3–15 (0–7)	Meeks Family Fieldhouse (287); Evansville, IN
01/26/2018; 7:00 pm, ESPN3		at Valparaiso	L 59–101	3–16 (0–8)	Athletics–Recreation Center (492); Valparaiso, IN
01/28/2018; 11:30 am, ESPN3		at Loyola–Chicago	L 63–82	3–17 (0–9)	Joseph J. Gentile Arena (221); Chicago, IL
02/02/2018; 7:00 pm, ESPN3		Indiana State	L 57–66	3–18 (0–10)	Meeks Family Fieldhouse (404); Evansville, IN
02/09/2018; 7:00 pm, ESPN3		Drake	L 50–101	3–19 (0–11)	Meeks Family Fieldhouse (361); Evansville, IN
02/11/2018; 1:00 pm, ESP2N3		Northern Iowa	L 60–85	3–20 (0–12)	Meeks Family Fieldhouse (374); Evansville, IN
02/16/2018; 7:00 pm, ESPN3		at Bradley	L 47–92	3–21 (0–13)	Renaissance Coliseum (684); Peoria, IL
02/18/2018; 2:00 pm, ESPN3		at Illinois State	L 44–70	3–22 (0–14)	Redbird Arena (1,109); Normal, IL
02/23/2018; 7:00 pm, ESPN3		Loyola–Chicago	L 47–60	3–23 (0–15)	Meeks Family Fieldhouse (419); Evansville, IN
02/25/2018; 1:00 pm, ESPN3		Valparaiso	L 54–67	3–24 (0–16)	Meeks Family Fieldhouse (323); Evansville, IN
03/01/2018; 7:00 pm, ESPN3		at Missouri State	L 51–97	3–25 (0–17)	JQH Arena (1,875); Springfield, MO
03/03/2018; 2:00 pm, ESPN3		at Southern Illinois	L 41–66	3–26 (0–18)	SIU Arena (755); Carbondale, IL
Missouri Valley Women's Tournament
02/28/2018; 7:00 pm, ESPN3	(10)	vs. (7) Bradley; First Round	L 49–77	3–27	TaxSlayer Center (1,028); Moline, IL
*Non-conference game. ^{#}Rankings from AP Poll. (#) Tournament seedings in parentheses. All times are in Central Time.

== See also ==
2017–18 Evansville Purple Aces men's basketball team
