= 2017–18 Valparaiso Crusaders women's basketball team =

Intercollegiate basketball season

2017–18 Valparaiso Crusaders women's basketball
- Conference: Missouri Valley Conference
- Record: 13–18 (5–13 MVC)
- Head coach: Tracey Dorow (6th season)
- Assistant coaches: Justin Rees; Clyde Manns; Megan Leuzinger
- Home arena: Athletics–Recreation Center

2017–18 Missouri Valley Conference women's basketball standings
	Conf.				Overall
Team	W		L	PCT	W		L	PCT
Drake †	18	–	0	1.000	26	–	8	.765
Missouri State	15	–	3	.833	21	–	12	.636
Northern Iowa	13	–	5	.722	19	–	14	.576
Southern Illinois	11	–	7	.611	17	–	14	.548
Indiana State	9	–	9	.500	11	–	19	.367
Illinois State	8	–	10	.444	14	–	16	.467
Bradley	6	–	12	.333	13	–	18	.419
Valparaiso	5	–	13	.278	13	–	18	.419
Loyola–Chicago	5	–	13	.278	7	–	23	.233
Evansville	0	–	18	.000	3	–	27	.100
† 2018 MVC tournament winner As of March 17, 2018

The 2017–18 Valparaiso Crusaders women's basketball team represented Valparaiso University during the 2017–18 NCAA Division I women's basketball season. The Crusaders, led by sixth-year head coach Tracey Dorow, played their home games at the Athletics–Recreation Center as first-year members of the Missouri Valley Conference. They finished the season 13–18, 5–13 in MVC play to finish in a tie for eighth place. They advanced to the quarterfinals of the Missouri Valley women's tournament, where they lost to Drake.

== Roster ==
2017–18 Valparaiso Crusaders women's basketball team
Players
Coaches

Pos.	#	Name	Height	Year	Previous school	Hometown
G	0	Maya Meredith	5 ft 7 in (1.7 m)	So	Cathedral	Indianapolis, IN
G	2	Meredith Hamlet	5 ft 8 in (1.73 m)	Jr	McBain	McBain, MI
G	3	Hannah Schaub	5 ft 6 in (1.68 m)	Jr	Park Center	Brooklyn Park, MN
G	11	Georgi Donchetz	5 ft 10 in (1.78 m)	Sr	Burnsville	Savage, MN
G/F	12	Addison Stoller	6 ft 0 in (1.83 m)	RS Fr	Cissna Park	Cissna Park, IL
F	13	Ella Ellenson	6 ft 2 in (1.88 m)	Fr	Rice Lake	Rice Lake, WI
F	14	Marlee Profitt	6 ft 2 in (1.88 m)	RS Fr	Highland	Medina, OH
F	15	Nicole Johnanson	6 ft 5 in (1.96 m)	Fr	Herscher	Herscher, IL
G	20	Nicole Konieczny	6 ft 9 in (2.06 m)	Fr	South Bend Saint Joseph	Granger, IN
F	22	Bryce Blood	6 ft 2 in (1.88 m)	Fr	Whitmer	Toledo, OH
G/F	25	Grace Hales	6 ft 0 in (1.83 m)	So	Westview	Cromwell, IN
F	32	Dani Franklin	6 ft 1 in (1.85 m)	Sr	George Washington	Cedar Rapids, IA
G/F	33	Allison Schofield	5 ft 9 in (1.75 m)	Jr	Heritage Christian	McCordsville, IN
G	34	Taylor Richards	6 ft 0 in (1.83 m)	Fr	Chippewa	Doylestown, OH
F	40	Caitlin Morrison	6 ft 2 in (1.88 m)	So	Glenbrook South	Glenview, IL

Head coach

- Tracey Dorow (Illinois State)

Assistant coach(es)

- Justin Rees (Barry)
- Clyde Manns (Pitt–Greensburg)
- Megan Leuzinger (Liberty)

Legend

- (C) Team captain
- (S) Suspended
- (I) Ineligible
- (W) Walk-on
- Injured
- Current redshirt

Roster

== Schedule and results ==
Date time, TV	Rank^{#}	Opponent^{#}	Result	Record	Site (attendance) city, state
Exhibition
Nov 7, 2017*; 7:00 pm		St. Francis (IL)	W 49–40		Athletics–Recreation Center (196); Valparaiso, IN
Non-conference regular season
Nov 16, 2017*; 7:00 pm, ESPN3		IU Kokomo	W 81–47	1–0	Athletics–Recreation Center (438); Valparaiso, IN
Nov 21, 2017*; 11:00 am, ESPN3		at Miami (OH)	L 68–77	1–1	Millett Hall (1,037); Oxford, OH
Nov 25, 2017*; 2:00 pm, ESPN3		Grand Canyon	W 80–75	2–1	Athletics–Recreation Center (239); Valparaiso, IN
Nov 28, 2017*; 6:00 pm, ESPN3		at Bowling Green	L 77–90	2–2	Stroh Center (1,389); Bowling Green, OH
Dec 2, 2017*; 3:00 pm, ESPN3		at Liberty	L 40–61	2–3	Vines Center (1,351); Lynchburg, VA
Dec 3, 2017; 1:00 pm		at Longwood	W 81–68	3–3	Willett Hall (473); Farmville, VA
Dec 8, 2017*; 6:00 pm		at Purdue	L 49–95	3–4	Mackey Arena (5,534); West Lafayette, IN
Dec 10, 2017*; 3:00 pm, ESPN3		Chicago State	W 71–60	4–4	Athletics–Recreation Center (289); Valparaiso, IN
Dec 15, 2017*; 7:00 pm, ESPN3		IU Northwest	W 99–59	5–4	Athletics–Recreation Center (388); Valparaiso, IN
Dec 18, 2017*; 12:00 pm		at Eastern Illinois	W 76–67	6–4	Lantz Arena (2,177); Charleston, IL
Dec 21, 2017*; 7:00 pm, ESPN3		Fort Wayne	W 68–50	7–4	Athletics–Recreation Center (495); Valparaiso, IN
Missouri Valley regular season
Dec 29, 2017; 7:00 pm, ESPN3		at Drake	L 50–86	7–5 (0–1)	Knapp Center (2,310); Des Moines, IA
Dec 31, 2017; 2:00 pm, ESPN3		at Northern Iowa	L 56–77	7–6 (0–2)	McLeod Center (1,368); Cedar Falls, IA
Jan 5, 2018; 7:00 pm, ESPN3		Illinois State	W 56–50	8–6 (1–2)	Athletics–Recreation Center (372); Valparaiso, IN
Jan 7, 2018; 3:00 pm, ESPN3		Bradley	L 69–88	8–7 (1–3)	Athletics–Recreation Center (322); Valparaiso, IN
Jan 12, 2018; 7:00 pm, ESPN3		Loyola–Chicago	W 76–60	9–7 (2–3)	Athletics–Recreation Center (348); Valparaiso, IN
Jan 19, 2018; 7:00 pm, ESPN3		at Missouri State	L 60–83	9–8 (2–4)	JQH Arena (2,486); Springfield, MO
Jan 21, 2018; 11:30 am, ESPN3		at Southern Illinois	L 61–74	9–9 (2–5)	SIU Arena (651); Carbondale, IL
Jan 26, 2018; 7:00 pm, ESPN3		Evansville	W 101–59	10–9 (3–5)	Athletics–Recreation Center (492); Valparaiso, IN
Jan 28, 2018; 3:00 pm, ESPN3		Indiana State	L 54–67	10–10 (3–6)	Athletics–Recreation Center (319); Valparaiso, IN
Feb 2, 2018; 7:00 pm, ESPN3		at Bradley	L 58–69	10–11 (3–7)	Renaissance Coliseum (780); Peoria, IL
Feb 4, 2018; 1:00 pm, ESPN3		at Illinois State	L 55–63	10–12 (3–8)	Redbird Arena (681); Bloomington, IL
Feb 11, 2018; 1:00 pm, ESPN3		at Loyola–Chicago	W 63–53	11–12 (4–8)	Joseph J. Gentile Arena (367); Chicago, IL
Feb 16, 2018; 7:00 pm, ESPN3		Southern Illinois	L 86–88 ^{2OT}	11–13 (4–9)	Athletics–Recreation Center (386); Valparaiso, IN
Feb 18, 2018; 3:00 pm, ESPN3		Missouri State	L 60–66	11–14 (4–10)	Athletics–Recreation Center (349); Valparaiso, IN
Feb 23, 2018; 6:00 pm, ESPN3		at Indiana State	L 46–64	11–15 (4–11)	Hulman Center (1,450); Terre Haute, IN
Feb 25, 2018; 1:00 pm, ESPN3		at Evansville	W 67–54	12–15 (5–11)	Meeks Family Fieldhouse (323); Evansville, IN
Mar 1, 2018; 7:00 pm, ESPN3		Northern Iowa	L 53–76	12–16 (5–12)	Athletics–Recreation Center (260); Valparaiso, IN
Mar 3, 2018; 3:00 pm, ESPN3		Drake	L 53–85	12–17 (5–13)	Athletics–Recreation Center (440); Valparaiso, IN
Missouri Valley Women's Tournament
March 8, 2018; 4:00 pm, ESPN3	(8)	vs. (9) Loyola Chicago; First Round	W 63–46	13–17	TaxSlayer Center; Moline, IL
March 9, 2018; 12:00 pm, ESPN3	(8)	vs. (1) Drake; Quarterfinals	L 40–89	13–18	TaxSlayer Center; Moline, IL
*Non-conference game. ^{#}Rankings from AP Poll. (#) Tournament seedings in parentheses. All times are in Central Time.

== See also ==
2017–18 Valparaiso Crusaders men's basketball team
