= Andrea Gorski =

American basketball coach (born 1970)

Biographical details
- Born: May 16, 1970 (age 55); Dearborn Heights, Michigan, U.S.

Playing career
- 1988–1992: Bradley
- Position(s): Point guard

Coaching career (HC unless noted)
- 1992–1993: Bradley (GA)
- 1996–2008: Ladywood HS
- 2008–2013: Concordia Ann Arbor
- 2013–2016: Southern Illinois (associate HC)
- 2016–2022: Bradley

Administrative career (AD unless noted)
- 2010–2013: Concordia Ann Arbor (associate AD)
- 2011–2012: Concordia Ann Arbor (interim AD)

Head coaching record
- Overall: 194–149 (.566) (college); 184–99 (.650) (high school)
- Tournaments: 0–1 (NCAA); 3–2 (NAIA)

Accomplishments and honors

Championships
- 2 WHAC regular season (2011, 2012); MVC tournament (2021)

Awards
- 2× WHAC Coach of the Year (2010, 2011); First-team All-MVC (1992)

Andrea Gorski (née McAllister; born May 16, 1970) is an American basketball coach who was the head women's basketball coach at Bradley University.

== Playing career ==
Gorski was a four-year point guard at Bradley, where she was a first-team all-conference selection as a senior, finishing her career in the top 10 of multiple career program records.

== Coaching career ==
Gorski began her coaching career as a graduate assistant at her alma mater Bradley in 1992. She left coaching for a job outside of basketball before returning as the head coach at Ladywood High School in Michigan. At Ladywood, she coached a team that won 11 district titles in 12 seasons and was also named the Michigan coach of the year in 2005 by the Associated Press.

Gorski was named the head coach at Concordia University Ann Arbor in 2008. She spent five seasons at Concordia, helping turn around a team that went sub-.500 the previous three seasons into a Wolverine–Hoosier Athletic Conference (WHAC) championship contender, making it to three NAIA tournaments and winning two WHAC coach of the year awards. Gorski left Concordia in 2013 to accept a position at Southern Illinois as their associate head coach, where her daughter Kiley committed to play basketball.

=== Bradley (second stint) ===
Gorski was named the head coach at Bradley on April 9, 2016. She received a contract extension in 2019 after leading the Braves to their best season in a decade, while also helping develop three first-team All-MVC players, the same amount of Bradley players selected in the previous 15 years.

Gorski led Bradley to their first Missouri Valley Conference tournament championship in 2021, which also included an NCAA tournament bid, the first in Bradley program history.

== Head coaching record ==
=== College ===
Statistics overview
Season	Team	Overall	Conference	Standing	Postseason
Concordia Ann Arbor Cardinals (Wolverine–Hoosier Athletic Conference) (2008–2013)
2008–09	Concordia Ann Arbor	8–22	2–12	T–7th	
2009–10	Concordia Ann Arbor	19–14	8–6	T–3rd	
2010–11	Concordia Ann Arbor	23–11	12–4	2nd	NAIA Division II Opening Round
2011–12	Concordia Ann Arbor	29–6	16–2	T–1st	NAIA Division II Sweet Sixteen
2012–13	Concordia Ann Arbor	28–7	20–2	T–1st	NAIA Division II Second Round
Concordia Ann Arbor:		106–59 (.642)	58–26 (.690)		
Bradley Braves (Missouri Valley Conference) (2016–2022)
2016–17	Bradley	12–19	7–11	7th	
2017–18	Bradley	13–18	6–12	7th	
2018–19	Bradley	20–10	10–8	5th	
2019–20	Bradley	22–7	13–5	3rd	
2020–21	Bradley	17–12	10–8	5th	NCAA Division I Round of 64
2021–22	Bradley	4–24	1–17	10th	
Bradley:		88–90 (.494)	37–61 (.378)		
Total:		194–149 (.566)			
National champion Postseason invitational champion Conference regular season champion Conference regular season and conference tournament champion Division regular season champion Division regular season and conference tournament champion Conference tournament champion

== Personal life ==
Gorski has two children, Luke and Kiley. Kiley was a basketball player who committed to Southern Illinois but did not play after her freshman year due to suffering a career-ending injury.

While coaching at Ladywood, Gorski was identified as the millionth fan to attend a Detroit Shock game, winning a prize package that included season tickets.
