= 2017–18 Missouri State Lady Bears basketball team =

Intercollegiate basketball season

2017–18 Missouri State Lady Bears basketball

WNIT, Second Round
- Conference: Missouri Valley Conference
- Record: 21–12 (15–3 The Valley)
- Head coach: Kellie Harper (5th season)
- Assistant coaches: Jon Harper; Jennifer Sullivan; Jackie Stiles
- Home arena: JQH Arena

2017–18 Missouri Valley Conference women's basketball standings
	Conf.				Overall
Team	W		L	PCT	W		L	PCT
Drake †	18	–	0	1.000	26	–	8	.765
Missouri State	15	–	3	.833	21	–	12	.636
Northern Iowa	13	–	5	.722	19	–	14	.576
Southern Illinois	11	–	7	.611	17	–	14	.548
Indiana State	9	–	9	.500	11	–	19	.367
Illinois State	8	–	10	.444	14	–	16	.467
Bradley	6	–	12	.333	13	–	18	.419
Valparaiso	5	–	13	.278	13	–	18	.419
Loyola–Chicago	5	–	13	.278	7	–	23	.233
Evansville	0	–	18	.000	3	–	27	.100
† 2018 MVC tournament winner As of March 17, 2018

The 2017–18 Missouri State Lady Bears basketball team represented Missouri State University during the 2017–18 NCAA Division I women's basketball season. The Lady Bears, led by fifth year head coach Kellie Harper, played their home games at JQH Arena and were members of the Missouri Valley Conference. They finished the season 21–12, 15–3 in MVC play to finish in second place. They advanced to the semifinals of the Missouri Valley Tournament where they lost to Northern Iowa. They received an automatic bid to the Women's National Invitation Tournament, where they defeated Louisiana Tech in the first round before losing to TCU in the second round.

== Previous season ==
They finished the season 16–15, 12–4 in MVC play to finish in third place. They lost in the semifinals of the Missouri Valley Tournament to Evansville. They received an automatic bid to the Women's National Invitation Tournament where they lost to Iowa in the first round.

== Roster ==
2017–18 Missouri State Bears women's basketball team
Players
Coaches

Pos.	#	Name	Height	Year	Previous school	Hometown
G	1	Danielle Gitzen	5 ft 10 in (1.78 m)	Jr	Chanhassen High	Victoria, MN
G	2	Elle Ruffridge	5 ft 3 in (1.6 m)	Fr	Pocahontas Area High	Pocahontas, IA
G	3	Lee Ann Polowy	5 ft 7 in (1.7 m)	Sr	Blair Oaks High	Jefferson City, MO
F	4	Abby Hipp	6 ft 2 in (1.88 m)	Fr	St. Pius X High	Kansas City, MO
G	5	Liza Fruendt	5 ft 9 in (1.75 m)	Sr	Batavia High	Batavia, IL
G	11	Brice Calip	5 ft 8 in (1.73 m)	RS Fr	Sapulpa High	Sapulpa, OK
F	12	Sydney Schultz	6 ft 2 in (1.88 m)	Fr	Oswego East High	Aurora, IL
F	13	Audrey Holt	6 ft 1 in (1.85 m)	Sr	Rock Bridge High	Columbia, MO
F	21	Aubrey Buckley	6 ft 1 in (1.85 m)	Sr	Parkview High	Springfield, MO
G	22	Alexia Willard	6 ft 2 in (1.88 m)	So	Stoutland High	Lebanon, MO
F	30	Shameka Ealy	6 ft 1 in (1.85 m)	So	Russellville High	Russellville, AR
G	34	Bri Ellis	5 ft 7 in (1.7 m)	RS Fr	Rock Bridge High	Columbia, MO
C	50	Emily Gartner	6 ft 4 in (1.93 m)	RS Fr	Hiawatha High	Hiawatha, KS

Head coach

- Kellie Harper (Tennessee)

Assistant coach(es)

- Jon Harper (Auburn)
- Jennifer Sullivan (Memphis)
- Jackie Stiles (Missouri State)

Legend

- (C) Team captain
- (S) Suspended
- (I) Ineligible
- (W) Walk-on
- Injured
- Current redshirt

Roster
Last update: January 4, 2018

== Schedule ==
Date time, TV	Rank^{#}	Opponent^{#}	Result	Record	Site (attendance) city, state
Exhibition
11/05/2017*; 2:00 pm		Lindenwood	W 75–48		JQH Arena (1,780); Springfield, MO
Non-conference regular season
11/13/2017*; 6:00 pm, ESPN3		at Ball State	L 58–70	0–1	Worthen Arena (1,040); Muncie, IN
11/15/2017*; 8:00 pm, ESPN3		Central Missouri	W 62–36	1–1	JQH Arena (3,001); Springfield, MO
11/19/2017*; 2:00 pm, KOZL		No. 23 Missouri	L 59–69	1–2	JQH Arena (4,251); Springfield, MO
11/23/2017*; 7:00 pm		vs. No. 8 Baylor; Junkanoo Jam Junkanoo Division semifinals	L 58–100	1–3	Gateway Christian Academy; Bimini, Bahamas
11/24/2017*; 6:45 pm		vs. Penn; Junkanoo Jam Junkanoo Division 3rd place game	L 60–65	1–4	Gateway Christian Academy; Bimini, Bahamas
11/29/2017*; 7:00 pm, KOZL		at Wichita State	L 58–72	1–5	Charles Koch Arena (1,988); Wichita, KS
12/04/2017*; 6:30 pm		at Little Rock	L 51–63	1–6	Jack Stephens Center (1,037); Little Rock, AR
12/07/2017*; 7:00 pm, ESPN3		Wichita State	W 78–65	2–6	JQH Arena (1,821); Springfield, MO
12/10/2017*; 2:00 pm, 0ESPN3		Oral Roberts	W 76–66	3–6	JQH Arena (2,034); Springfield, MO
12/16/2017*; 2:00 pm, ESPN3		Northwestern	W 90–59	4–6	JQH Arena (2,121); Springfield, MO
12/19/2017*; 12:00 pm		at Alabama	L 61–65	4–7	Coleman Coliseum (1,971); Tuscaloosa, AL
Missouri Valley regular season
12/29/2017; 6:00 pm, ESPN3		at Indiana State	W 77–63	5–7 (1–0)	Hulman Center (1,272); Terre Haute, IN
12/31/2017; 1:00 pm, ESPN3		at Evansville	W 95–65	6–7 (2–0)	Meeks Family Fieldhouse (332); Evansville, IN
01/05/2018; 7:00 pm, KOZL		Drake	L 68–80	6–8 (2–1)	JQH Arena (2,204); Springfield, MO
01/07/2018; 2:00 pm, ESPN3		Northern Iowa	W 62–52	7–8 (3–1)	JQH Arena (1,871); Springfield, MO
01/12/2018; 7:00 pm, KOZL		at Illinois State	W 56–50	8–8 (4–1)	Redbird Arena (718); Normal, IL
01/14/2018; 2:00 pm, ESPN3		at Bradley	W 71–65	9–8 (5–1)	Renaissance Coliseum (918); Peoria, IL
01/19/2018; 7:00 pm, ESPN3		Valparaiso	W 83–60	10–8 (6–1)	JQH Arena (2,486); Springfield, MO
01/21/2018; 2:00 pm, ESPN3		Loyola–Chicago	W 75–36	11–8 (7–1)	JQH Arena (2,326); Springfield, MO
01/26/2018; 2:00 pm, ESPN3		at Southern Illinois	L 69–71 ^{OT}	11–9 (7–2)	SIU Arena (703); Carbondale, IL
02/02/2018; 7:00 pm, ESPN3		at Northern Iowa	W 57–52	12–9 (8–2)	McLeod Center (1,406); Cedar Falls, IA
02/04/2018; 2:00 pm, ESPN3		at Drake	L 65–84	12–10 (8–3)	Knapp Center (3,784); Des Moines, IA
02/09/2018; 7:00 pm, ESPN3		Bradley	W 74–54	13–10 (9–3)	JQH Arena (2,417); Springfield, MO
02/11/2018; 2:00 pm, ESPN3		Illinois State	W 75–58	14–10 (10–3)	JQH Arena (1,246); Springfield, MO
02/16/2018; 7:00 pm, ESPN3		at Loyola–Chicago	W 69–58	15–10 (11–3)	Joseph J. Gentile Arena (502); Chicago, IL
02/18/2018; 3:00 pm, KOZL		at Valparaiso	W 66–60	16–10 (12–3)	Athletics–Recreation Center (349); Valparaiso, IN
02/23/2018; 7:00 pm, ESPN3		Southern Illinois	W 79–61	17–10 (13–3)	JQH Arena (2,383); Springfield, MO
03/01/2018; 7:00 pm, KOZL		Evansville	W 97–51	18–10 (14–3)	JQH Arena (1,875); Springfield, MO
03/03/2018; 2:00 pm, ESPN3		Indiana State	W 69–56	19–10 (15–3)	JQH Arena (2,412); Springfield, MO
Missouri Valley Women's Tournament
03/09/2018; 6:00 pm, ESPN3	(2)	vs. (7) Bradley; Quarterfinals	W 76–68	20–10	TaxSlayer Center; Moline, IL
03/10/2018; 4:00 pm, ESPN3	(2)	vs. (3) Northern Iowa; Semifinals	L 58–70	20–11	TaxSlayer Center (2,129); Moline, IL
WNIT
03/15/2018*; 6:30 pm		at Louisiana Tech; First Round	W 63–59	21–11	Thomas Assembly Center (1,734); Ruston, LA
03/17/2018*; 12:00 pm		at TCU; Second Round	L 51–86	21–12	Schollmaier Arena (1,069); Fort Worth, TX
*Non-conference game. ^{#}Rankings from AP Poll. (#) Tournament seedings in parentheses. All times are in Central Time.

== See also ==
- 2017–18 Missouri State Bears basketball team
