= 2017–18 Southern Illinois Salukis women's basketball team =

Intercollegiate basketball season

2017–18 Southern Illinois Salukis women's basketball
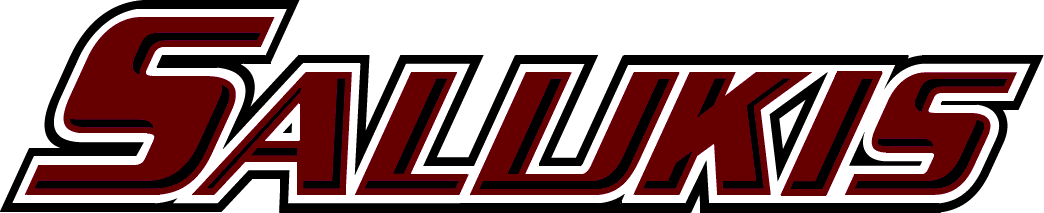
- Conference: Missouri Valley Conference
- Record: 17–14 (11–7 The Valley)
- Head coach: Cindy Stein (5th season)
- Assistant coaches: Amanda Hanneman; Christelle N'Garsanet; Nicole Collier
- Home arena: SIU Arena

2017–18 Missouri Valley Conference women's basketball standings
	Conf.				Overall
Team	W		L	PCT	W		L	PCT
Drake †	18	–	0	1.000	26	–	8	.765
Missouri State	15	–	3	.833	21	–	12	.636
Northern Iowa	13	–	5	.722	19	–	14	.576
Southern Illinois	11	–	7	.611	17	–	14	.548
Indiana State	9	–	9	.500	11	–	19	.367
Illinois State	8	–	10	.444	14	–	16	.467
Bradley	6	–	12	.333	13	–	18	.419
Valparaiso	5	–	13	.278	13	–	18	.419
Loyola–Chicago	5	–	13	.278	7	–	23	.233
Evansville	0	–	18	.000	3	–	27	.100
† 2018 MVC tournament winner As of March 17, 2018

The 2017–18 Southern Illinois women's basketball team represented Southern Illinois University Carbondale during the 2017–18 NCAA Division I women's basketball season. The Salukis were led by fifth year head coach Cindy Stein. They played their home games at SIU Arena and were members of the Missouri Valley Conference. They finished the season 17–14, 11–7 in MVC play to finish in fourth place. They advanced to the semifinals of the Missouri Valley women's tournament, where they lost to Drake.

== Previous season ==
They finished the season 16–15, 10–8 in MVC play to finish in fourth place. They lost in the quarterfinals of the Missouri Valley women's tournament to Wichita State. They were invited to the Women's Basketball Invitational where they lost to Milwaukee in the first round.

== Roster ==
2017–18 Southern Illinois Salukis women's basketball team
Players
Coaches

Pos.	#	Name	Height	Year	Previous school	Hometown
G	3	Olivia Bowling	5 ft 9 in (1.75 m)	Jr	Elizabethtown	New Haven, KY
G	10	Brittney Patrick	5 ft 6 in (1.68 m)	So	Bolingbrook	Bolingbrook, IL
G	12	Makenzie Silvey	5 ft 11 in (1.8 m)	Fr	Edwardsville	Glen Carbon, IL
G/F	15	Caitlyn Claussen	6 ft 0 in (1.83 m)	So	Wamego	Manhattan, KS
G/F	22	Tiajaney Hawkins	5 ft 10 in (1.78 m)	RS So	Central	East Chicago, IN
G	23	Kristen Nelson	5 ft 9 in (1.75 m)	So	Harrison	Farmington Hills, MI
F	24	Criste'On Waters	6 ft 1 in (1.85 m)	RS Fr	Edwardsville	Edwardsville, IL
F	25	Abby Brockmeyer	6 ft 1 in (1.85 m)	Fr	Lincolnwood	Raymond, IL
F/C	31	Lauren Hartman	6 ft 3 in (1.91 m)	So	Tremont	Tremont, IL
G	32	Kylie Giebelhausen	6 ft 1 in (1.85 m)	Sr	East Peoria	East Peoria, IL
F	33	Rachel Pudlowski	5 ft 11 in (1.8 m)	Fr	Fort Zumwalt	O'Fallon, MO
F	34	Nicole Martin	6 ft 1 in (1.85 m)	So	Jefferson City	Jefferson City, MO
F/C	35	Celina VanHyfte	6 ft 0 in (1.83 m)	RS Jr	Annawan	Annawa, IL
F/C	42	Ashley Hummel	6 ft 1 in (1.85 m)	Jr	Hilliard Bradley	Hilliard, OH

Head coach

- Cindy Stein (Illinois)

Assistant coach(es)

- Amanda Hanneman (Missouri)
- Christelle N'Garsanet (Missouri)
- Nicole Collier (Missouri Western)

Legend

- (C) Team captain
- (S) Suspended
- (I) Ineligible
- (W) Walk-on
- Injured
- Current redshirt

Roster
Last update: January 4, 2018

== Schedule ==
Date time, TV	Rank^{#}	Opponent^{#}	Result	Record	Site (attendance) city, state
Exhibition
10/28/2017*; 2:00 pm, ESPN3		Kentucky Wesleyan	W 89–41		SIU Arena (605); Carbondale, IL
11/03/2017*; 6:00 pm		Lindenwood	W 90–68		SIU Arena (650); Carbondale, IL
Non-conference regular season
11/10/2017*; 6:00 pm		UT Martin	W 84–72	1–0	SIU Arena (625); Carbondale, IL
11/13/2017*; 4:30 pm		at UAB	L 66–76	1–1	Bartow Arena (407); Birmingham, AL
11/19/2017*; 2:00 pm		at Memphis	W 68–56	2–1	Elma Roane Fieldhouse (440); Memphis, TN
11/22/2017*; 1:00 pm		at Southeast Missouri State	W 79–74 ^{OT}	3–1	Show Me Center; Cape Girardeau, MO
11/27/2017*; 6:00 pm, ESPN3		SIU Edwardsville	L 53–57	3–2	SIU Arena (450); Carbondale, IL
11/30/2017*; 7:15 pm		at Morehead State	L 81–85	3–3	Ellis Johnson Arena (2,387); Morehead, KY
12/02/2017*; 12:00 pm		at Marshall	W 64–59	4–3	Cam Henderson Center (517); Huntington, WV
12/07/2017*; 12:00 pm, ESPN3		Martin Methodist	W 60–50	5–3	SIU Arena (2,222); Carbondale, IL
12/10/2017*; 2:00 pm, ESPN3		Western Kentucky	L 49–75	5–4	SIU Arena (700); Carbondale, IL
12/19/2017*; 12:00 pm		vs. Albany; Puerto Rico Classic	L 57–68	5–5	Coliseo Rubén Zayas Montañez (105); San Juan, PR
12/20/2017*; 12:00 pm		vs. Miami (FL); Puerto Rico Classic	L 65–75	5–6	Coliseo Rubén Zayas Montañez (116); San Juan, PR
Missouri Valley regular season
12/29/2017; 7:00 pm, ESPN3		at Evansville	W 74–62	6–6 (1–0)	Meeks Family Fieldhouse (324); Evansville, IN
12/31/2017; 1:00 pm, ESPN3		at Indiana State	W 64–45	7–6 (2–0)	Hulman Center (1,252); Terre Haute, IN
01/05/2018; 6:00 pm, ESPN3		Northern Iowa	W 60–53 ^{OT}	8–6 (3–0)	SIU Arena (703); Carbondale, IL
01/07/2018; 2:00 pm, ESPN3		Drake	L 64–75	8–7 (3–1)	SIU Arena (706); Carbondale, IL
01/12/2018; 7:00 pm, ESPN3		at Bradley	W 63–62	9–7 (4–1)	Renaissance Coliseum (927); Peoria, IL
01/14/2018; 2:00 pm, ESPN3		at Illinois State	L 46–49	9–8 (4–2)	Redbird Arena (1,528); Normal, IL
01/19/2018; 6:00 pm, ESPN3		Loyola–Chicago	W 62–46	10–8 (5–2)	SIU Arena (713); Carbondale, IL
01/21/2018; 11:30 am, ESPN3		Valparaiso	W 74–63	11–8 (6–2)	SIU Arena (651); Carbondale, IL
01/26/2018; 2:00 pm, ESPN3		Missouri State	W 71–69 ^{OT}	12–8 (7–2)	SIU Arena (703); Carbondale, IL
02/02/2018; 7:00 pm, ESPN3		at Drake	L 73–84	12–9 (7–3)	Knapp Center (2,714); Des Moines, IA
02/04/2018; 2:00 pm, ESPN3		at Northern Iowa	L 63–71	12–10 (7–4)	McLeod Center (1,387); Cedar Falls, IA
02/09/2018; 6:00 pm, ESPN3		Illinois State	L 36–39	12–11 (7–5)	SIU Arena (658); Carbondale, IL
02/11/2018; 11:30 am, ESPN3		Bradley	W 62–53	13–11 (8–5)	SIU Arena (757); Carbondale, IL
02/16/2018; 7:00 pm, ESPN3		at Valparaiso	W 88–86 ^{2OT}	14–11 (9–5)	Athletics–Recreation Center (386); Valparaiso, IN
02/18/2018; 1:00 pm, ESPN3		at Loyola–Chicago	L 53–62	14–12 (9–6)	Joseph J. Gentile Arena (311); Chicago, IL
02/23/2018; 7:00 pm, ESPN3		at Missouri State	L 61–79	14–13 (9–7)	JQH Arena (2,383); Springfield, MO
03/01/2018; 6:00 pm, ESPN3		Indiana State	W 54–43	15–13 (10–7)	SIU Arena (760); Carbondale, IL
03/03/2018; 2:00 pm, ESPN3		Evansville	W 66–41	16–13 (11–7)	SIU Arena (755); Carbondale, IL
Missouri Valley Women's Tournament
03/09/2018; 2:30 pm, ESPN3	(4)	vs. (5) Indiana State; Quarterfinals	W 69–67	17–13	TaxSlayer Center (1,403); Moline, IL
03/10/2018; 1:30 pm, ESPN3	(4)	vs. (1) Drake; Semifinals	L 59–68	17–14	TaxSlayer Center; Moline, IL
*Non-conference game. ^{#}Rankings from AP Poll. (#) Tournament seedings in parentheses. All times are in Central Time.

== See also ==
2017–18 Southern Illinois Salukis men's basketball team
