= 2017–18 Illinois State Redbirds women's basketball team =

Intercollegiate basketball season

2017–18 Illinois State Redbirds women's basketball

Beach Classic champions
- Conference: Missouri Valley Conference
- Record: 14–16 (8–10 The Valley)
- Head coach: Kristen Gillespie (1st season)
- Assistant coaches: Jessica Keller; Niki Washington; Scott Gillespie
- Home arena: Redbird Arena

2017–18 Missouri Valley Conference women's basketball standings
	Conf.				Overall
Team	W		L	PCT	W		L	PCT
Drake †	18	–	0	1.000	26	–	8	.765
Missouri State	15	–	3	.833	21	–	12	.636
Northern Iowa	13	–	5	.722	19	–	14	.576
Southern Illinois	11	–	7	.611	17	–	14	.548
Indiana State	9	–	9	.500	11	–	19	.367
Illinois State	8	–	10	.444	14	–	16	.467
Bradley	6	–	12	.333	13	–	18	.419
Valparaiso	5	–	13	.278	13	–	18	.419
Loyola–Chicago	5	–	13	.278	7	–	23	.233
Evansville	0	–	18	.000	3	–	27	.100
† 2018 MVC tournament winner As of March 17, 2018

The 2017–18 Illinois State Redbirds women's basketball team represented Illinois State University during the 2017–18 NCAA Division I women's basketball season. The Redbirds, led by first-year head coach Kristen Gillespie, played their home games at Redbird Arena and were members of the Missouri Valley Conference (MVC). They finished the season 14–16, 8–10 in MVC play, to finish in sixth place. They lost in the quarterfinals of the Missouri Valley women's tournament to Northern Iowa.

== Previous season ==
In 2016–17, the Redbirds finished the season 8–23, 5–13 in MVC play, to finish in ninth place. They advanced to the quarterfinals of the Missouri Valley women's tournament where they lost to Northern Iowa.

== Roster ==
2017–18 Illinois State Redbirds women's basketball team
Players
Coaches

Pos.	#	Name	Height	Year	Previous school	Hometown
G	0	Zakiya Beckles	5 ft 6 in (1.68 m)	So	Middlesex	Middlesex, NJ
G	2	Deja Turner	5 ft 11 in (1.8 m)	So	Plant	Tampa, FL
G	3	Ajai Simmons	5 ft 10 in (1.78 m)	Fr	Brentwood	Studio City, CA
F	12	Millie Stevens	6 ft 0 in (1.83 m)	Jr	Sevenoaks Suns (WBBL team)	Surrey, England
G	13	Katrina Beck	5 ft 9 in (1.75 m)	Jr	Whitney Young	Chicago, IL
G	14	Paige Saylor	5 ft 5 in (1.65 m)	Fr	Roncalli	Martinsville, IN
G	15	Frannie Corrigan	5 ft 11 in (1.8 m)	So	Lyons Township	La Grange Park, IL
G	23	Viria Livingston	5 ft 8 in (1.73 m)	Jr	Hopkins	Minnetonka, MN
F	24	Megan Talbot	6 ft 2 in (1.88 m)	So	Barrington	Barrington, IL
F	25	Hannah Green	6 ft 0 in (1.83 m)	Sr	West Ranch; College of the Canyons	Santa Clarita, CA
G	30	Amaria Allen	5 ft 10 in (1.78 m)	So	Colerain	Cincinnati, OH
F	32	Simone Goods	6 ft 2 in (1.88 m)	Jr	Benson HS; Kirkwood CC	Omaha, NE
G	33	Morgan VanHyfte	6 ft 0 in (1.83 m)	So	Annawan	Annawan, IL

Head coach

- Kristen Gillespie (NC State)

Assistant coach(es)

- Jessica Keller (Quincy)
- Niki Washington (Southern Illinois)
- Scott Gillespie (Ripon)

Legend

- (C) Team captain
- (S) Suspended
- (I) Ineligible
- (W) Walk-on
- Injured
- Current redshirt

Roster
Last update: August 2, 2024

== Schedule ==
Date time, TV	Rank^{#}	Opponent^{#}	Result	Record	Site (attendance) city, state
Exhibition
November 1, 2017*; 7:00 p.m.		Eureka	W 80–54		Redbird Arena (564); Normal, IL
Non-conference regular season
November 11, 2017*; 12:00 p.m.		at Oakland	L 43–64	0–1	Athletics Center O'rena (801); Rochester, MI
November 15, 2017*; 7:00 p.m., ESPN3		Northern Kentucky	W 49–37	1–1	Redbird Arena (561); Normal, IL
November 22, 2017*; 11:00 a.m.		at George Mason	L 37–56	1–2	EagleBank Arena (432); Fairfax, VA
November 26, 2017*; 2:00 p.m., ESPN3		UMKC	W 64–53	2–2	Redbird Arena (572); Normal, IL
November 30, 2017*; 7:00 p.m., ESPN3		SIU Edwardsville	W 62–47	3–2	Redbird Arena (782); Normal, IL
December 2, 2017*; 2:00 p.m., ESPN3		Butler	L 45–56	3–3	Redbird Arena (613); Normal, IL
December 7, 2017*; 7:00 p.m., ESPN3		at Milwaukee	L 59–61	3–4	Klotsche Center (389); Milwaukee, WI
December 10, 2017*; 2:00 p.m., ESPN3		Eastern Michigan	W 65–56	4–4	Redbird Arena (592); Normal, IL
December 17, 2017*; 2:00 p.m., ESPN3		Cleveland State	L 47–56	4–5	Redbird Arena (657); Normal, IL
December 20, 2017*; 5:00 p.m.		at Long Beach State; Beach Classic semifinals	W 59–51	5–5	Walter Pyramid (712); Long Beach, CA
December 21, 2017*; 4:00 p.m.		vs. Northeastern; Beach Classic championship game	W 65–55	6–5	Walter Pyramid (684); Long Beach, CA
Missouri Valley regular season
December 31, 2017; 11:00 a.m., ESPN3		Bradley	L 42–62	6–6 (0–1)	Redbird Arena (741); Normal, IL
January 5, 2018; 7:00 p.m., ESPN3		at Valparaiso	L 50–56	6–7 (0–2)	Athletics–Recreation Center (372); Valparaiso, IN
January 7, 2018; 1:00 p.m., ESPN3		at Loyola–Chicago	L 59–62	6–8 (0–3)	Joseph J. Gentile Arena (302); Chicago, IL
January 12, 2018; 7:00 p.m., ESPN3		Missouri State	L 50–56	6–9 (0–4)	Redbird Arena (718); Normal, IL
January 14, 2018; 2:00 p.m., ESPN3		Southern Illinois	W 49–46	7–9 (1–4)	Redbird Arena (1,528); Normal, IL
January 19, 2018; 7:00 p.m., ESPN3		at Evansville	W 67–43	8–9 (2–4)	Meeks Family Fieldhouse (447); Evansville, IN
January 21, 2018; 2:00 p.m., ESPN3		at Indiana State	L 49–52	8–10 (2–5)	Hulman Center (1,811); Terre Haute, IN
January 26, 2018; 7:00 p.m., ESPN3		Drake	L 58–65	8–11 (2–6)	Redbird Arena (607); Normal, IL
January 28, 2018; 2:00 p.m., ESPN3		Northern Iowa	L 36–58	8–12 (2–7)	Redbird Arena (1,073); Normal, IL
February 2, 2018; 7:00 p.m., ESPN3		Loyola–Chicago	W 57–49	9–12 (3–7)	Redbird Arena (719); Normal, IL
February 4, 2018; 1:00 p.m., ESPN3		Valparaiso	W 63–55	10–12 (4–7)	Redbird Arena (741); Normal, IL
February 9, 2018; 6:00 p.m., ESPN3		at Southern Illinois	W 39–36	11–12 (5–7)	SIU Arena (658); Carbondale, IL
February November 2018; 2:00 p.m., ESPN3		at Missouri State	L 58–75	11–13 (5–8)	JQH Arena (1,246); Springfield, MO
February 16, 2018; 7:00 p.m., ESPN3		Indiana State	W 63–53	12–13 (6–8)	Redbird Arena (579); Normal, IL
February 18, 2018; 2:00 p.m., ESPN3		Evansville	W 70–44	13–13 (7–8)	Redbird Arena (1,109); Normal, IL
February 23, 2018; 7:00 p.m., ESPN3		at Northern Iowa	L 48–66	13–14 (7–9)	McLeod Center (1,461); Cedar Falls, IA
February 25, 2018; 2:00 p.m., ESPN3		at Drake	L 64–80	13–15 (7–10)	Knapp Center (3,152); Des Moines, IA
March 3, 2018; 2:00 p.m., ESPN3		at Bradley	W 53–41	14–15 (8–10)	Renaissance Coliseum (810); Peoria, IL
Missouri Valley women's tournament
March 9, 2018; 8:30 p.m., ESPN3	(6)	vs. (3) Northern Iowa; Quarterfinals	L 36–56	14–16	TaxSlayer Center (1,706); Moline, IL
*Non-conference game. ^{#}Rankings from AP poll. (#) Tournament seedings in parentheses. All times are in Central.

== See also ==
- 2017–18 Illinois State Redbirds men's basketball team
