= 2017–18 Loyola Ramblers women's basketball team =

Intercollegiate basketball season

2017–18 Loyola Ramblers women's basketball
- Conference: Missouri Valley Conference
- Record: 7–23 (5–13 The Valley)
- Head coach: Kate Achter (2nd season)
- Assistant coaches: Maria Noucas; Michael Scruggs; Bianca Smith
- Home arena: Joseph J. Gentile Arena

2017–18 Missouri Valley Conference women's basketball standings
	Conf.				Overall
Team	W		L	PCT	W		L	PCT
Drake †	18	–	0	1.000	26	–	8	.765
Missouri State	15	–	3	.833	21	–	12	.636
Northern Iowa	13	–	5	.722	19	–	14	.576
Southern Illinois	11	–	7	.611	17	–	14	.548
Indiana State	9	–	9	.500	11	–	19	.367
Illinois State	8	–	10	.444	14	–	16	.467
Bradley	6	–	12	.333	13	–	18	.419
Valparaiso	5	–	13	.278	13	–	18	.419
Loyola–Chicago	5	–	13	.278	7	–	23	.233
Evansville	0	–	18	.000	3	–	27	.100
† 2018 MVC tournament winner As of March 17, 2018

The 2017–18 Loyola Ramblers women's basketball team represented Loyola University Chicago during the 2017–18 NCAA Division I women's basketball season. The Ramblers, led by second-year head coach Kate Achter, played their home games at the Joseph J. Gentile Arena in Chicago, illinois and were members of the Missouri Valley Conference (MVC). They finished the season 7–23, 5–13 in MVC play, to finish in a tie for eighth place. They lost in the first round of the Missouri Valley women's tournament to Valparaiso.

== Previous season ==
The Ramblers finished the 2016–17 season 2–28, 2–16 in MVC play, to finish in tenth (last) place. They lost in the first round of the Missouri Valley women's tournament to Bradley.

== Roster ==
2017–18 Loyola Ramblers women's basketball team
Players
Coaches

Pos.	#	Name	Height	Year	Previous school	Hometown
G	1	Lauren Segars	5 ft 9 in (1.75 m)	So	Boys and Girls	Queens, NY
G	2	Ellie Rice	5 ft 10 in (1.78 m)	Fr	Regents School of Austin	Austin, TX
G/F	3	Alexis Meyer	5 ft 11 in (1.8 m)	Fr	Westview	Portland, OR
G/F	4	Abby O'Connor	6 ft 0 in (1.83 m)	Fr	St. Joseph	South Bend, IN
G	5	Tiara Wallace	5 ft 6 in (1.68 m)	So	Montini Catholic	Berkeley, IL
G/F	11	Brandi Segars	5 ft 11 in (1.8 m)	Jr	Mount Zion Christian Academy	Queens, NY
G/F	12	Citiana Negatu	5 ft 9 in (1.75 m)	Jr	Blake	Silver Spring, MD
G/F	13	Katie Salmon	6 ft 1 in (1.85 m)	Sr	Wauwatosa East	Wauwatosa, WI
G	20	Kailyn Strawbridge	5 ft 7 in (1.7 m)	Fr	Rockford Lutheran	Rockford, IL
G	30	Jessica Cerda	5 ft 10 in (1.78 m)	RS Sr	Streamwood; Chicago State	Streamwood, IL
F/C	32	Kat Nolan	6 ft 1 in (1.85 m)	Fr	Rolling Meadows	Arlington Heights, IL
G/F	33	Lee Williams	5 ft 8 in (1.73 m)	Sr	Potter's House Christian Academy; Chattanooga State CC	Ajax, ON

Head coach

- Kate Achter (Bowling Green)

Assistant coach(es)

- Maria Noucas (Bowdoin)
- Michael Scruggs (Tennessee)
- Bianca Smith (Colorado)

Legend

- (C) Team captain
- (S) Suspended
- (I) Ineligible
- (W) Walk-on
- Injured
- Current redshirt

Roster
Last update: March 30, 2025

== Schedule ==
Date time, TV	Rank^{#}	Opponent^{#}	Result	Record	Site (attendance) city, state
Exhibition
November 7, 2017*; 7:00 p.m.		Concordia (IL)	W 91–56		Joseph J. Gentile Arena (215); Chicago, IL
Non-conference regular season
November 12, 2017*; 2:00 p.m.		at Fort Wayne	L 70–79	0–1	Hilliard Gates Sports Center (637); Fort Wayne, IN
November 15, 2017*; 7:00 p.m., ESPN3		Western Michigan	L 47–65	0–2	Joseph J. Gentile Arena (312); Chicago, IL
November 18, 2017*; 1:00 p.m., ESPN3		Youngstown State	L 49–73	0–3	Joseph J. Gentile Arena (224); Chicago, IL
November 21, 2017*; 7:00 p.m., ESPN3		at Milwaukee	L 41–63	0–4	Klotsche Center (352); Milwaukee, WI
November 28, 2017*; 11:30 a.m., SPEC		at No. 23 Marquette	L 30–93	0–5	Al McGuire Center (3,700); Milwaukee, WI
December 1, 2017*; 7:00 p.m.		at Chicago State	W 46–28	1–5	Jones Convocation Center (112); Chicago, IL
December 4, 2017*; 11:30 a.m.		at DePaul	L 47–88	1–6	Wintrust Arena (5,152); Chicago, IL
December 6, 2017*; 11:00 a.m., ESPN3		at Northern Illinois	L 71–80	1–7	Convocation Center (1,271); DeKalb, IL
December 10, 2017*; 1:00 p.m., ESPN3		No. 23 Green Bay	L 39–76	1–8	Joseph J. Gentile Arena (304); Chicago, IL
December 18, 2017*; 7:00 p.m.		at Butler	L 52–64	1–9	Hinkle Fieldhouse (427); Indianapolis, IN
December 22, 2017*; 7:00 p.m., ESPN3		UIC	W 57–55	2–9	Joseph J. Gentile Arena (167); Chicago, IL
Missouri Valley regular season
December 29, 2017; 7:00 p.m., ESPN3		at Northern Iowa	L 41–70	2–10 (0–1)	McLeod Center (1,234); Cedar Falls, IA
December 31, 2017; 2:00 p.m., ESPN3		at Drake	L 46–72	2–11 (0–2)	Knapp Center (2,190); Des Moines, IA
January 5, 2018; 7:00 p.m., ESPN3		Bradley	L 57–59	2–12 (0–3)	Joseph J. Gentile Arena (233); Chicago, IL
January 7, 2018; 1:00 p.m., ESPN3		Illinois State	W 62–59	3–12 (1–3)	Joseph J. Gentile Arena (302); Chicago, IL
January 12, 2018; 7:00 p.m., ESPN3		at Valparaiso	L 60–76	3–13 (1–4)	Athletics–Recreation Center (348); Valparaiso, IN
January 19, 2018; 7:00 p.m., ESPN3		at Southern Illinois	L 46–62	3–14 (1–5)	SIU Arena (713); Carbondale, IL
January 21, 2018; 2:00 p.m., ESPN3		at Missouri State	L 36–75	3–15 (1–6)	JQH Arena (2,326); Springfield, MO
January 26, 2018; 7:00 p.m., ESPN3		Indiana State	L 65–73	3–16 (1–7)	Joseph J. Gentile Arena (307); Chicago, IL
January 28, 2018; 11:00 a.m., ESPN3		Evansville	W 82–63	4–16 (2–7)	Joseph J. Gentile Arena (221); Chicago, IL
February 2, 2018; 7:00 p.m., ESPN3		at Illinois State	L 49–57	4–17 (2–8)	Redbird Arena (719); Normal, IL
February 4, 2018; 1:00 p.m., ESPN3		at Bradley	W 71–61	5–17 (3–8)	Renaissance Coliseum (558); Peoria, IL
February 11, 2018; 1:00 p.m., ESPN3		Valparaiso	L 53–63	5–18 (3–9)	Joseph J. Gentile Arena (367); Chicago, IL
February 16, 2018; 2:00 p.m., ESPN3		Missouri State	L 58–69	5–19 (3–10)	Joseph J. Gentile Arena (502); Chicago, IL
February 18, 2018; 7:00 p.m., ESPN3		Southern Illinois	W 62–53	6–19 (4–10)	Joseph J. Gentile Arena (311); Chicago, IL
February 23, 2018; 7:00 p.m., ESPN3		at Evansville	W 60–47	7–19 (5–10)	Meeks Family Fieldhouse (419); Evansville, IN
February 25, 2018; 2:00 p.m., ESPN3		at Indiana State	L 67–74	7–20 (5–11)	Hulman Center (1,580); Terre Haute, IN
March 1, 2017; 7:00 p.m., ESPN3		Drake	L 53–97	7–21 (5–12)	Joseph J. Gentile Arena (272); Chicago, IL
March 3, 2018; 1:00 p.m., ESPN3		Northern Iowa	L 38–64	7–22 (5–13)	Joseph J. Gentile Arena (342); Chicago, IL
Missouri Valley women's tournament
March 8, 2018; 4:00 p.m., ESPN3	(9)	vs. (8) Valparaiso; First round	L 46–63	7–23	TaxSlayer Center; Moline, IL
*Non-conference game. ^{#}Rankings from Coaches' Poll. (#) Tournament seedings in parentheses. All times are in Central.

== See also ==
- 2017–18 Loyola Ramblers men's basketball team
