= 2017–18 Drake Bulldogs women's basketball team =

Intercollegiate basketball season

2017–18 Drake Bulldogs women's basketball

MVC regular season and tournament champions

NCAA tournament, first round
- Conference: Missouri Valley Conference
- Record: 26–8 (18–0 The Valley)
- Head coach: Jennie Baranczyk (6th season)
- Assistant coaches: Allison Pohlman; Nicci Hays Fort; Markisha Wright
- Home arena: Knapp Center

2017–18 Missouri Valley Conference women's basketball standings
	Conf.				Overall
Team	W		L	PCT	W		L	PCT
Drake †	18	–	0	1.000	26	–	8	.765
Missouri State	15	–	3	.833	21	–	12	.636
Northern Iowa	13	–	5	.722	19	–	14	.576
Southern Illinois	11	–	7	.611	17	–	14	.548
Indiana State	9	–	9	.500	11	–	19	.367
Illinois State	8	–	10	.444	14	–	16	.467
Bradley	6	–	12	.333	13	–	18	.419
Valparaiso	5	–	13	.278	13	–	18	.419
Loyola–Chicago	5	–	13	.278	7	–	23	.233
Evansville	0	–	18	.000	3	–	27	.100
† 2018 MVC tournament winner As of March 17, 2018

The 2017–18 Drake Bulldogs women's basketball team represented Drake University during the 2017–18 NCAA Division I women's basketball season. The Bulldogs, led by sixth year head coach Jennie Baranczyk, played their home games at Knapp Center and are members of the Missouri Valley Conference. They finished the season 26–8, 18–0 in MVC play to win the MVC regular season championship. They defeated Valparaiso, Southern Illinois and Northern Iowa to become champions of the Missouri Valley women's tournament and earn an automatic trip to the NCAA women's tournament, where they lost to Texas A&M in the first round.

== Roster ==
2017–18 Drake Bulldogs women's basketball team
Players
Coaches

Pos.	#	Name	Height	Year	Previous school	Hometown
G	2	Maddie Monahan	5 ft 8 in (1.73 m)	Fr	Glencoe-Silver Lake	Silver Lake, MN
G	5	Becca Hittner	6 ft 0 in (1.83 m)	So	Dowling Catholic	Urbandale, IA
G/F	12	Brenni Rose	6 ft 0 in (1.83 m)	So	Shawnee Mission Northwest	Shawnee, KS
G	15	Paige Greiner	5 ft 5 in (1.65 m)	Sr	Williamsburg	Williamsburg, IA
G	20	Maddy Dean	5 ft 9 in (1.75 m)	RS Sr	Jordan	Jordan, MN
G	21	Sammie Bachrodt	5 ft 10 in (1.78 m)	Jr	Kapaun Mt. Carmel	Wichita, KS
G	22	Hannah Fuller	5 ft 8 in (1.73 m)	Fr	Valley	West Des Moines, IA
G	24	Nicole Miller	5 ft 9 in (1.75 m)	Jr	North Linn	Walker, IA
G	30	Katie Van Scyoc	6 ft 1 in (1.85 m)	Fr	Lourdes Academy	Green Lake, WI
F	31	Monica Burich	6 ft 2 in (1.88 m)	RS So	Roseville; Colorado	Roseville, MN
F/C	35	Becca Jonas	6 ft 2 in (1.88 m)	RS Jr	Truman	Independence, MO
F/C	40	Mya Mertz	6 ft 2 in (1.88 m)	So	Blue Valley Northwest	Overland Park, KS
F	50	Sara Rhine	6 ft 1 in (1.85 m)	RS So	Eldon	Eldon, MO

Head coach

- Jennie Baranczyk (Iowa)

Assistant coach(es)

- Allison Pohlman (Northern Iowa)
- Nicci Hays Fort (Loyola (MD))
- Markisha Wright (Notre Dame)

Legend

- (C) Team captain
- (S) Suspended
- (I) Ineligible
- (W) Walk-on
- Injured
- Current redshirt

Roster

== Schedule ==
Date time, TV	Rank^{#}	Opponent^{#}	Result	Record	Site (attendance) city, state
Exhibition
11/01/2017*; 7:00 pm		Grand View	W 115–43		Knapp Center (1,993); Des Moines, IA
11/05/2017*; 2:00 pm		Truman State	W 90–50		Knapp Center (2,059); Des Moines, IA
Non-conference regular season
11/10/2017*; 7:00 pm, ESPN3		Milwaukee; Preseason WNIT First Round	W 77–73	1–0	Knapp Center (2,658); Des Moines, IA
11/12/2017*; 4:00 pm		at No. 11 Oregon; Preseason WNIT Quarterfinals	L 77–110	1–1	Matthew Knight Arena (2,658); Eugene, OR
11/17/2017*; 7:00 pm		Liberty; Preseason WNIT Consolation Round	W 96–68	2–1	Knapp Center (2,022); Des Moines, IA
11/21/2017*; 7:30 pm		at Wyoming	L 61–75	2–2	Arena-Auditorium (2,453); Laramie, WY
11/24/2017*; 3:30 pm		vs. George Mason; Rocky Mountain Hoops Classic semifinals	L 75–87	2–3	Coors Events Center (1,486); Boulder, CO
11/25/2017*; 1:00 pm		vs. Mississippi Valley State; Rocky Mountain Hoops Classic 3rd place game	W 96–60	3–3	Coors Events Center (250); Boulder, CO
11/30/2017*; 7:00 pm, MC22		Iowa State	W 83–80	4–3	Knapp Center (3,212); Des Moines, IA
12/03/2017*; 2:00 pm, MC22		Creighton	L 100–108 ^{4OT}	4–4	Knapp Center (2,863); Des Moines, IA
12/05/2017*; 11:00 am, ESPN3		Iowa Wesleyan	W 102–25	5–4	Knapp Center (4,615); Des Moines, IA
12/09/2017*; 2:00 pm, ESPN3		Nebraska	L 84–89 ^{2OT}	5–5	Knapp Center (2,683); Des Moines, IA
12/17/2017*; 2:00 pm, ESPN3		South Dakota State	L 78–85	5–6	Knapp Center (2,309); Des Moines, IA
12/21/2017*; 7:00 pm		at No. 25 Iowa	L 66–79	5–7	Carver–Hawkeye Arena (4,847); Iowa City, IA
Missouri Valley Conference regular season
12/29/2017; 7:00 pm, ESPN3		Valparaiso	W 86–50	6–7 (1–0)	Knapp Center (2,310); Des Moines, IA
12/31/2017; 2:00 pm, ESPN3		Loyola–Chicago	W 72–46	7–7 (2–0)	Knapp Center (2,190); Des Moines, IA
01/05/2018; 7:00 pm, ESPN3		at Missouri State	W 80–68	8–7 (3–0)	JQH Arena (2,204); Springfield, MO
01/07/2018; 2:00 pm, ESPN3		at Southern Illinois	W 75–64	9–7 (4–0)	SIU Arena (706); Carbondale, IL
01/12/2018; 7:00 pm, ESPN3		Indiana State	W 85–64	10–7 (5–0)	Knapp Center (2,287); Des Moines, IA
01/14/2018; 2:00 pm, ESPN3		Evansville	W 107–66	11–7 (6–0)	Knapp Center (2,520); Des Moines, IA
01/19/2018; 7:00 pm, ESPN3		Northern Iowa	W 81–64	12–7 (7–0)	Knapp Center (3,331); Des Moines, IA
01/26/2018; 7:00 pm, ESPN3		at Illinois State	W 65–58	13–7 (8–0)	Redbird Arena (607); Normal, IL
01/28/2018; 2:00 pm, ESPN3		at Bradley	W 84–75	14–7 (9–0)	Renaissance Coliseum (733); Peoria, IL
02/02/2018; 7:00 pm, ESPN3		Southern Illinois	W 84–73	15–7 (10–0)	Knapp Center (2,714); Des Moines, IA
02/04/2018; 2:00 pm, ESPN3		Missouri State	W 84–65	16–7 (11–0)	Knapp Center (3,784); Des Moines, IA
02/09/2018; 7:00 pm, ESPN3		at Evansville	W 101–50	17–7 (12–0)	Meeks Family Fieldhouse (361); Evansville, IN
02/11/2018; 1:00 pm, ESPN3		at Indiana State	W 84–51	18–7 (13–0)	Hulman Center (1,657); Terre Haute, IN
02/16/2018; 7:00 pm, ESPN3		at Northern Iowa	W 72–67	19–7 (14–0)	McLeod Center (1,966); Cedar Falls, IA
02/23/2018; 7:00 pm, ESPN3		Bradley	W 77–71	20–7 (15–0)	Knapp Center (3,922); Des Moines, IA
02/25/2018; 2:00 pm, ESPN3		Illinois State	W 80–64	21–7 (16–0)	Knapp Center (3,152); Des Moines, IA
03/01/2017; 7:00 pm, ESPN3		at Loyola–Chicago	W 97–53	22–7 (17–0)	Joseph J. Gentile Arena (272); Chicago, IL
03/03/2018; 3:00 pm, ESPN3		at Valparaiso	W 85–53	23–7 (18–0)	Athletics–Recreation Center (440); Valparaiso, IN
Missouri Valley Women's Tournament
03/09/2018; 12:00 pm, ESPN3	(1)	vs. (8) Valparaiso; Quarterfinals	W 89–40	24–7	TaxSlayer Center; Moline, IL
03/10/2018; 1:30 pm, ESPN3	(1)	vs. (4) Southern Illinois; Semifinals	W 68–59	25–7	TaxSlayer Center; Moline, IL
03/11/2018; 2:00 pm, ESPN3	(1)	vs. (3) Northern Iowa; Championship Game	W 75–63	26–7	TaxSlayer Center (2,169); Moline, IL
NCAA Women's Tournament
03/16/2018*; 1:30 pm, ESPN2	(13 S)	at (4 S) No. 14 Texas A&M; First Round	L 76–89	26–8	Reed Arena (2,835); College Station, TX
*Non-conference game. ^{#}Rankings from AP Poll. (#) Tournament seedings in parentheses. S=Spokane Region. All times are in Central Time.

== Rankings ==
+ Regular season polls	Poll	Pre- Season	Week 2	Week 3	Week 4	Week 5	Week 6	Week 7	Week 8	Week 9	Week 10	Week 11	Week 12	Week 13	Week 14	Week 15	Week 16	Week 17	Week 18	Week 19	Final
AP																				N/A	
Coaches	RV																				

Legend
	Increase in ranking
	Decrease in ranking
	Not ranked previous week
(RV)	Received Votes

== See also ==
2017–18 Drake Bulldogs men's basketball team
