= 2017–18 Northern Iowa Panthers women's basketball team =

Intercollegiate basketball season

2017–18 Northern Iowa Panthers women's basketball

WNIT, first round
- Conference: Missouri Valley Conference
- Record: 19–14 (13–5 The Valley)
- Head coach: Tanya Warren (11th season)
- Assistant coaches: Brad Nelson; Steven Fennelly; KK Armstrong
- Home arena: McLeod Center

2017–18 Missouri Valley Conference women's basketball standings
	Conf.				Overall
Team	W		L	PCT	W		L	PCT
Drake †	18	–	0	1.000	26	–	8	.765
Missouri State	15	–	3	.833	21	–	12	.636
Northern Iowa	13	–	5	.722	19	–	14	.576
Southern Illinois	11	–	7	.611	17	–	14	.548
Indiana State	9	–	9	.500	11	–	19	.367
Illinois State	8	–	10	.444	14	–	16	.467
Bradley	6	–	12	.333	13	–	18	.419
Valparaiso	5	–	13	.278	13	–	18	.419
Loyola–Chicago	5	–	13	.278	7	–	23	.233
Evansville	0	–	18	.000	3	–	27	.100
† 2018 MVC tournament winner As of March 17, 2018

The 2017–18 Northern Iowa Panthers women's basketball team represented the University of Northern Iowa in the 2017–18 NCAA Division I women's basketball season. The Panthers, led by eleventh-year head coach Tanya Warren, played their home games at McLeod Center and were members of the Missouri Valley Conference. They finished the season 19–14, 13–5 in MVC play to finish in third place. They advanced to the championship game of the Missouri Valley Tournament, where they lost to Drake. They received an at-large bid to the Women's National Invitation Tournament, where they lost to Milwaukee in the first round.

== Previous season ==
They Panthers advanced to the championship game of the Missouri Valley Tournament, where they lost to Drake. They received an at-large bid to the NCAA women's tournament for the first time since 2011, where they lost to DePaul in the first round.

== Roster ==
2017–18 Northern Iowa Panthers women's basketball team
Players
Coaches

Pos.	#	Name	Height	Year	Previous school	Hometown
G	3	Karli Rucker	5 ft 6 in (1.68 m)	Fr	North Scott	Eldridge, IA
G	5	Nicole Kroeger	5 ft 10 in (1.78 m)	Fr	Palmyra	Palmyra, MO
G	10	Ellie Howell	5 ft 9 in (1.75 m)	RS Jr	Manson Northwest Webster	Manson, IA
F	11	Bre Gunnels	6 ft 1 in (1.85 m)	Fr	Southeast	Kansas City, MO
F	15	Dariann Garrison-Nickerson	5 ft 10 in (1.78 m)	Jr	Des Moines East	West Des Moines, IA
G	21	Riley Wheatcraft	5 ft 11 in (1.8 m)	Fr	Prior Lake	Prior Lake, MN
G	22	Rose Simon-Ressler	5 ft 10 in (1.78 m)	RS So	Western Dubuque	Epworth, IA
G	23	Kennedy Kirkpatrick	5 ft 10 in (1.78 m)	RS Sr	Free State; Bowling Green	Lawrence, KS
G	24	Mikaela Morgan	5 ft 10 in (1.78 m)	Jr	Iowa City West	Coralville, IA
F	32	Heidi Hillyard	6 ft 0 in (1.83 m)	RS So	Mediapolis	Burlington, IA
F	34	Taylor Hagen	6 ft 1 in (1.85 m)	Jr	Blooming Prairie	Blooming Prairie, MN
G	41	Abby Gerrits	5 ft 10 in (1.78 m)	So	Pewaukee	Pewaukee, WI
F	42	Marissa Robson	6 ft 1 in (1.85 m)	Fr	Stoughton	Oregon, WI
F	50	Megan Maahs	6 ft 1 in (1.85 m)	So	Western Dubuque	Epworth, IA

Head coach

- Tanya Warren (Creighton)

Assistant coach(es)

- Brad Nelson (Oregon)
- Steven Fennelly (Iowa State)
- KK Armstrong (Northern Iowa)

Legend

- (C) Team captain
- (S) Suspended
- (I) Ineligible
- (W) Walk-on
- Injured
- Current redshirt

Roster
Last update: January 4, 2018

== Schedule ==
Date time, TV	Rank^{#}	Opponent^{#}	Result	Record	Site (attendance) city, state
Exhibition
11/05/2017*; 4:00 pm, ESPN3		Sioux Falls	W 80–53		McLeod Center (1,110); Cedar Falls, IA
Non-conference regular season
11/10/2017*; 7:00 pm, ESPN3		IUPUI	L 48–54	0–1	McLeod Center (1,852); Cedar Falls, IA
11/14/2017*; 7:00 pm, PSN/ESPN3		Iowa State	W 57–53	1–1	McLeod Center (2,099); Cedar Falls, IA
11/21/2017*; 6:00 pm		at Creighton	L 78–89 ^{2OT}	1–2	D. J. Sokol Arena (632); Omaha, NE
11/25/2017*; 11:00 am		vs. Wyoming; UCF Thanksgiving Classic	W 55–40	2–2	CFE Arena; Orlando, FL
11/26/2017*; 12:30 pm		at UCF; UCF Thanksgiving Classic	L 43–53	2–3	CFE Arena (2,755); Orlando, FL
11/30/2017*; 7:00 pm		at South Dakota State	L 47–57	2–4	Frost Arena (1,760); Brookings, SD
12/02/2017*; 2:00 pm, FSNOR		at North Dakota	L 72–80	2–5	Betty Engelstad Sioux Center (1,877); Grand Forks, ND
12/06/2017*; 7:00 pm		at Omaha	L 74–78	2–6	Baxter Arena (995); Omaha, NE
12/10/2017*; 1:00 pm, ESPN3		UW–Parkside	W 92–62	3–6	McLeod Center (1,131); Cedar Falls, IA
12/17/2017*; 2:00 pm, ESPN3		No. 25 Iowa	L 47–71	3–7	McLeod Center (3,008); Cedar Falls, IA
12/21/2017*; 7:00 pm, ESPN3		at Kansas State	W 72–71	4–7	Bramlage Coliseum (3,260); Manhattan, KS
Missouri Valley Conference regular season
12/29/2017; 7:00 pm, ESPN3		Loyola–Chicago	W 70–41	5–7 (1–0)	McLeod Center (1,234); Cedar Falls, IA
12/31/2017; 2:00 pm, ESPN3		Valparaiso	W 77–56	6–7 (2–0)	McLeod Center (1,368); Cedar Falls, IA
01/05/2018; 6:00 pm, ESPN3		at Southern Illinois	L 53–60 ^{OT}	6–8 (2–1)	SIU Arena (703); Carbondale, IL
01/07/2018; 2:00 pm, ESPN3		at Missouri State	L 52–62	6–9 (2–2)	JQH Arena (1,871); Springfield, MO
01/12/2018; 7:00 pm, ESPN3		Evansville	W 65–41	7–9 (3–2)	McLeod Center (1,596); Cedar Falls, IA
01/14/2018; 2:00 pm, ESPN3		Indiana State	W 59–53	8–9 (4–2)	McLeod Center (1,486); Cedar Falls, IA
01/19/2018; 7:00 pm, ESPN3		at Drake	L 64–81	8–10 (4–3)	Knapp Center (3,331); Des Moines, IA
01/26/2018; 7:00 pm, ESPN3		at Bradley	W 56–40	9–10 (5–3)	Renaissance Coliseum (786); Peoria, IL
01/28/2018; 2:00 pm, ESPN3		at Illinois State	W 58–36	10–10 (6–3)	Redbird Arena (1,073); Normal, IL
02/02/2018; 7:00 pm, ESPN3		Missouri State	L 52–57	10–11 (7–3)	McLeod Center (1,406); Cedar Falls, IA
02/04/2018; 2:00 pm, ESPN3		Southern Illinois	W 71–63	11–11 (7–4)	McLeod Center (1,387); Cedar Falls, IA
02/09/2018; 6:00 pm, ESPN3		at Indiana State	W 56–46	12–11 (8–4)	Hulman Center (1,639); Terre Haute, IN
02/11/2018; 1:00 pm, ESPN3		at Evansville	W 85–60	13–11 (9–4)	Meeks Family Fieldhouse (374); Evansville, IN
02/16/2018; 2:00 pm, ESPN3		Drake	L 67–72	13–12 (9–5)	McLeod Center (1,966); Cedar Falls, IA
02/23/2018; 7:00 pm, ESPN3		Illinois State	W 66–48	14–12 (10–5)	McLeod Center (1,461); Cedar Falls, IA
02/25/2018; 2:00 pm, ESPN3		Bradley	W 63–50	15–12 (11–5)	McLeod Center (1,166); Cedar Falls, IA
03/01/2018; 7:00 pm, ESPN3		Valparaiso	W 76–53	16–12 (12–5)	Athletics–Recreation Center (260); Valparaiso, IN
03/03/2018; 1:00 pm, ESPN3		at Loyola–Chicago	W 64–38	17–12 (13–5)	Joseph J. Gentile Arena (342); Chicago, IL
Missouri Valley Women's Tournament
03/09/2018; 8:30 pm, ESPN3	(3)	vs. (6) Illinois State; Quarterfinals	W 56–36	18–12	TaxSlayer Center (1,706); Moline, IL
03/10/2018; 4:00 pm, ESPN3	(3)	vs. (2) Missouri State; Semifinals	W 70–58	19–12	TaxSlayer Center (2,129); Moline, IL
03/11/2018; 2:00 pm, ESPN3	(3)	vs. (1) Drake; Championship Game	L 63–75	19–13	TaxSlayer Center (2,169); Moline, IL
WNIT
03/15/2018*; 7:00 pm, ESPN3		Milwaukee; First Round	L 67–81	19–14	McLeod Center (1,105); Cedar Falls, IA
*Non-conference game. ^{#}Rankings from AP Poll. (#) Tournament seedings in parentheses. All times are in Central Time.

== See also ==
- 2017–18 Northern Iowa Panthers men's basketball team
