= 2017–18 Indiana State Sycamores women's basketball team =

Intercollegiate basketball season

2017–18 Indiana State Sycamores women's basketball
- Conference: Missouri Valley Conference
- Record: 11–19 (9–9 The Valley)
- Head coach: Josh Keister (Interim)
- Assistant coaches: Janet Eaton; Evan Dodd
- Home arena: Hulman Center

2017–18 Missouri Valley Conference women's basketball standings
	Conf.				Overall
Team	W		L	PCT	W		L	PCT
Drake †	18	–	0	1.000	26	–	8	.765
Missouri State	15	–	3	.833	21	–	12	.636
Northern Iowa	13	–	5	.722	19	–	14	.576
Southern Illinois	11	–	7	.611	17	–	14	.548
Indiana State	9	–	9	.500	11	–	19	.367
Illinois State	8	–	10	.444	14	–	16	.467
Bradley	6	–	12	.333	13	–	18	.419
Valparaiso	5	–	13	.278	13	–	18	.419
Loyola–Chicago	5	–	13	.278	7	–	23	.233
Evansville	0	–	18	.000	3	–	27	.100
† 2018 MVC tournament winner As of March 17, 2018

The 2017–18 Indiana State Sycamores women's basketball team represented Indiana State University during the 2017–18 NCAA Division I women's basketball season. The Sycamores, led by interim head coach Josh Keister, played their home games at the Hulman Center and were members of the Missouri Valley Conference. They finished the season 11–19, 9–9 in MVC play to finish in fifth place. They lost in the quarterfinals of the Missouri Valley women's tournament to Southern Illinois.

== Previous season ==
They finished the season 12–18, 6–12 in MVC play to finish in eighth place. They lost in the first round of the Missouri Valley women's tournament to Illinois State.

== Roster ==
2017–18 Indiana State Sycamores women's basketball team
Players
Coaches

Pos.	#	Name	Height	Year	Previous school	Hometown
F	1	Ashley Taia	6 ft 0 in (1.83 m)	RS Sr	St. John Paul; Odessa College	Brisbane, Australia
G	2	Freja Christensen	5 ft 10 in (1.78 m)	Sr	Falkonergardens Gymnasium	Copenhagen, Denmark
G	3	Ashli O'Neal	5 ft 5 in (1.65 m)	So	Wyoming	Wyoming, OH
G	4	Maryam Wilcher	6 ft 0 in (1.83 m)	So	Morton West	Berwyn, IL
G	5	Maeva Kitantou	5 ft 8 in (1.73 m)	Jr	Northeast CC	Orléans, France
G	11	Krystal Rice	5 ft 8 in (1.73 m)	Fr	Flint Hamady	Flint, MI
G	13	Alexis Delgado	5 ft 7 in (1.7 m)	Jr	Tolleston Union; Phoenix College	Phoenix, AZ
G	14	Tierra Webb	5 ft 7 in (1.7 m)	Jr	Rich South	Richton Park, IL
F	21	Kendra Boone	6 ft 2 in (1.88 m)	Jr	Ridgeway; State Fair CC	Memphis, TN
F	23	Wendi Bibbins	6 ft 2 in (1.88 m)	Sr	Helen Cox; Jones County JC	Harvey, LA
F	24	Kierra Isaiah	6 ft 0 in (1.83 m)	Jr	Hogan Preparatory Academy; Johnson County CC	Kansas City, MO
F	30	Regan Wentland	6 ft 1 in (1.85 m)	Jr	Center Grove	Greenwood, IN
F	33	Ty Battle	6 ft 1 in (1.85 m)	Fr	Oswego East	Plainfield, IL
F	34	AJ Thomas	5 ft 10 in (1.78 m)	Fr	North Central	Detroit, MI

Head coach

- Josh Keister (Mount Mercy)

Assistant coach(es)

- Janet Eaton (Dillard)
- Evan Dodd (Indiana State)

Legend

- (C) Team captain
- (S) Suspended
- (I) Ineligible
- (W) Walk-on
- Injured
- Current redshirt

Roster
Last update: January 4, 2018

== Schedule ==
Date time, TV	Rank^{#}	Opponent^{#}	Result	Record	Site (attendance) city, state
Exhibition
11/03/2017*; 5:00 pm		at Eastern Illinois; Hurricane Relief Charity Event	L 70–77		Lantz Arena; Charleston, IL
11/05/2017*; 2:00 pm		Illinois–Springfield	W 72–46		Hulman Center (1,340); Terre Haute, IN
Non-conference regular season
11/10/2017*; 7:00 pm		Saint Louis	L 59–60	0–1	Hulman Center (1,469); Terre Haute, IN
11/17/2017*; 7:00 pm		at IUPUI	L 57–86	0–2	The Jungle (611); Indianapolis, IN
11/20/2017*; 7:00 pm		Florida Atlantic	L 58–66	0–3	Hulman Center (1,258); Terre Haute, IN
11/23/2017*; 9:00 pm		vs. Montana; Cancún Challenge Rivera Division	W 57–45	1–3	Hard Rock Hotel Riviera Maya (982); Cancún, Mexico
11/24/2017*; 6:30 pm		vs. South Dakota; Cancún Challenge Rivera Division	L 59–71	1–4	Hard Rock Hotel Riviera Maya (982); Cancún, Mexico
11/28/2017*; 7:00 pm		Missouri S&T	W 84–51	2–4	Hulman Center (1,402); Terre Haute, IN
11/30/2017*; 8:00 pm, ESPN3		at UIC	L 46–55	2–5	UIC Pavilion (701); Chicago, IL
12/07/2017*; 8:00 pm		at Illinois	L 52–81	2–6	State Farm Center (1,044); Champaign, IL
12/09/2017*; 1:00 pm, ESPN3		Central Michigan	L 67–77	2–7	Hulman Center (1,322); Terre Haute, IN
12/19/2017*; 7:00 pm, ESPN3		Miami (OH)	L 56–68	2–8	Hulman Center (1,295); Terre Haute, IN
12/21/2017*; 7:00 pm, ESPN3		Xavier	L 51–60	2–9	Hulman Center (1,277); Terre Haute, IN
Missouri Valley Conference regular season
12/29/2017; 7:00 pm, ESPN3		Missouri State	L 63–77	2–10 (0–1)	Hulman Center (1,272); Terre Haute, IN
12/31/2017; 2:00 pm, ESPN3		Southern Illinois	L 45–64	2–11 (0–2)	Hulman Center (1,252); Terre Haute, IN
01/05/2018; 7:00 pm, ESPN3		Evansville	W 56–48	3–11 (1–2)	Hulman Center (1,529); Terre Haute, IN
01/12/2018; 8:00 pm, ESPN3		at Drake	L 64–85	3–12 (1–3)	Knapp Center (2,287); Des Moines, IA
01/14/2018; 3:00 pm, ESPN3		at Northern Iowa	L 53–59	3–13 (1–4)	McLeod Center (1,486); Cedar Falls, IA
01/19/2018; 7:00 pm, ESPN3		Bradley	W 65–50	4–13 (2–4)	Hulman Center (1,791); Terre Haute, IN
01/21/2018; 2:00 pm, ESPN3		Illinois State	W 52–49	5–13 (3–4)	Hulman Center (1,811); Terre Haute, IN
01/26/2018; 8:00 pm, ESPN3		at Loyola–Chicago	W 73–65	6–13 (4–4)	Joseph J. Gentile Arena (307); Chicago, IL
01/28/2018; 4:00 pm, ESPN3		at Valparaiso	W 67–54	7–13 (5–4)	Athletics–Recreation Center (319); Valparaiso, IN
02/02/2018; 8:00 pm, ESPN3		at Evansville	W 66–57	8–13 (6–4)	Meeks Family Fieldhouse (404); Evansville, IN
02/09/2018; 7:00 pm, ESPN3		Northern Iowa	L 46–56	8–14 (6–5)	Hulman Center (1,639); Terre Haute, IN
02/11/2018; 2:00 pm, ESPN3		Drake	L 51–84	8–15 (6–6)	Hulman Center (1,657); Terre Haute, IN
02/16/2018; 8:00 pm, ESPN3		at Illinois State	L 53–63	8–16 (6–7)	Redbird Arena (579); Normal, IL
02/18/2018; 3:00 pm, ESPN3		at Bradley	W 74–70	9–16 (7–7)	Renaissance Coliseum (811); Peoria, IL
02/23/2018; 7:00 pm, ESPN3		Valparaiso	W 64–46	10–16 (8–7)	Hulman Center (1,450); Terre Haute, IN
02/25/2018; 2:00 pm, ESPN3		Loyola–Chicago	W 74–67	11–16 (9–7)	Hulman Center (1,580); Terre Haute, IN
03/01/2017; 7:00 pm, ESPN3		at Southern Illinois	L 43–54	11–17 (9–8)	SIU Arena (760); Carbondale, IL
03/03/2017; 2:00 pm, ESPN3		at Missouri State	L 56–69	11–18 (9–9)	JQH Arena (2,412); Springfield, MO
Missouri Valley Women's Tournament
03/09/2018; 2:30 pm, ESPN3	(5)	vs. (4) Southern Illinois; Quarterfinals	L 67–69	11–19	TaxSlayer Center (1,403); Moline, IL
*Non-conference game. ^{#}Rankings from AP Poll. (#) Tournament seedings in parentheses. All times are in Eastern Time.

== See also ==
2017–18 Indiana State Sycamores men's basketball team
