= 2018 Missouri Valley Conference women's basketball tournament =

- Classification: Division I
- Season: 2017–18
- Teams: 10
- Site: TaxSlayer Center; Moline, Illinois
- Champions: Drake Bulldogs (7th title)
- Winning coach: Jennie Baranczyk (2nd title)
- MVP: Maddy Dean (Drake)
- Attendance: 8,435
- Television: ESPN3

2017–18 Missouri Valley Conference women's basketball standings
	Conf.				Overall
Team	W		L	PCT	W		L	PCT
Drake †	18	–	0	1.000	26	–	8	.765
Missouri State	15	–	3	.833	21	–	12	.636
Northern Iowa	13	–	5	.722	19	–	14	.576
Southern Illinois	11	–	7	.611	17	–	14	.548
Indiana State	9	–	9	.500	11	–	19	.367
Illinois State	8	–	10	.444	14	–	16	.467
Bradley	6	–	12	.333	13	–	18	.419
Valparaiso	5	–	13	.278	13	–	18	.419
Loyola–Chicago	5	–	13	.278	7	–	23	.233
Evansville	0	–	18	.000	3	–	27	.100
† 2018 MVC tournament winner As of March 17, 2018

The 2018 Missouri Valley Conference women's basketball tournament (also known as the Hoops in the Heartland Tournament) was part of the 2017–18 NCAA Division I women's basketball season and was played in Moline, Illinois, March 8–11, 2018, at the TaxSlayer Center. The tournament's winner received the Missouri Valley Conference's automatic bid to the 2018 NCAA tournament.

== Tie-breaking procedures ==
- 1. Winner of head-to-head competition
- 2. If three or more teams are tied, regular-season competition among the tied teams shall be pooled into a “mini round-robin.” Teams shall be ranked according to their position in such a round-robin.
- 3. Power rating using MVC games:

Team place	Road Win	Home Win
1st	20 pts.	19 pts.
2nd	18 pts.	17 pts.
3rd	16 pts.	15 pts.
4th	14 pts.	13 pts.
5th	12 pts.	11 pts.
6th	10 pts.	19 pts.
7th	8 pts.	7 pts.
8th	6pts.	5 pts.
9th	4 pts.	3 pts.
10th	2 pts.	1 pts.

- 4. The most recently available NCAA RPI ranking.

== Seeds ==
2018 Missouri Valley Conference women's basketball tournament seeds and results
Seed	School	Conf.	Over.	Tiebreaker
1	‡ Drake	18–0	26–7	
2	# Missouri State	15–3	20–11	
3	# Northern Iowa	13–5	19–13	
4	# Southern Illinois	11–7	17–14	
5	# Indiana State	9–9	11–19	
6	# Illinois State	8–10	14–16	
7	Bradley	6–12	13–18	
8	Valparaiso	5–13	13–18	2–0 vs. Loyola-Chicago
9	Loyola-Chicago	5–13	7–23	0–2 vs. Valparaiso
10	Evansville	0–18	3–27	
‡ – Missouri Valley Conference regular season champions, and tournament No. 1 seed. # - Received a single-bye in the conference tournament. Overall records include all games played in the Missouri Valley Conference tournament.

== Schedule ==
Session	Game	Time*	Matchup^{#}	Television	Attendance
First round – Thursday, March 8
1	1	4:00 pm	No. 8 Valparaiso vs. No. 9 Loyola-Chicago	ESPN3	1,028
1	2	7:00 pm	No. 7 Bradley vs. No. 10 Evansville	ESPN3	1,028
Quarterfinals – Friday, March 9
2	3	12:00 pm	No. 1 Drake vs. No 8. Valparaiso	ESPN3	1,403
2	4	2:30 pm	No. 4 Southern Illinois vs. No. 5 Indiana State	ESPN3	1,403
3	5	6:00 pm	No. 2 Missouri State vs. No. 7 Bradley	ESPN3	1,706
3	6	8:30 pm	No. 3 Northern Iowa vs. No. 6 Illinois State	ESPN3	1,706
Semifinals – Saturday, March 10
4	7	1:30 pm	No. 1 Drake vs. No. 4 Southern Illinois	ESPN3	2,129
4	8	4:00 pm	No. 2 Missouri State vs. No. 3 Northern Iowa	ESPN3	2,129
Final – Sunday, March 11
5	9	2:00 pm	No. 1 Drake vs. No. 3 Northern Iowa	ESPN3	2,169
*Game Times in CT. #-Rankings denote tournament seed

== Tournament bracket ==
First round Thursday, March 8 ESPN3
8	Valparaiso	63
9	Loyola	46
7	Bradley	77
10	Evansville	49

Quarterfinals; Friday, March 9 ESPN3
1	Drake	89
8	Valparaiso	40
4	Southern Illinois	69
5	Indiana State	67
2	Missouri State	76
7	Bradley	68
3	Northern Iowa	56
6	Illinois State	36

Semifinals; Saturday, March 10; ESPN3
1	Drake	68
4	Southern Illinois	59
2	Missouri State	58
3	Northern Iowa	70

Championship; Sunday, March 11; ESPN3
1	Drake	75
3	Northern Iowa	63

== See also ==
- 2018 Missouri Valley Conference men's basketball tournament
