= 2017–18 Bradley Braves women's basketball team =

Intercollegiate basketball season

2017–18 Bradley Braves women's basketball
- Conference: Missouri Valley Conference
- Record: 13–18 (6–12 The Valley)
- Head coach: Andrea Gorski (2nd season)
- Assistant coaches: Paul Fessler; Christena Hamilton; Kristi Zeller
- Home arena: Renaissance Coliseum

2017–18 Missouri Valley Conference women's basketball standings
| | Conf. | | | | Overall |
| Team | W | | L | PCT | W | | L | PCT |
|---|---|---|---|---|---|---|---|---|
| Drake † | 18 | – | 0 | 1.000 | 26 | – | 8 | .765 |
| Missouri State | 15 | – | 3 | .833 | 21 | – | 12 | .636 |
| Northern Iowa | 13 | – | 5 | .722 | 19 | – | 14 | .576 |
| Southern Illinois | 11 | – | 7 | .611 | 17 | – | 14 | .548 |
| Indiana State | 9 | – | 9 | .500 | 11 | – | 19 | .367 |
| Illinois State | 8 | – | 10 | .444 | 14 | – | 16 | .467 |
| Bradley | 6 | – | 12 | .333 | 13 | – | 18 | .419 |
| Valparaiso | 5 | – | 13 | .278 | 13 | – | 18 | .419 |
| Loyola–Chicago | 5 | – | 13 | .278 | 7 | – | 23 | .233 |
| Evansville | 0 | – | 18 | .000 | 3 | – | 27 | .100 |
† 2018 MVC tournament winner As of March 17, 2018

The 2017–18 Bradley Braves women's basketball team represented Bradley University during the 2017–18 NCAA Division I women's basketball season. The Braves were led by second year head coach Andrea Gorski. The Braves were members of the Missouri Valley Conference and played their home games at Renaissance Coliseum. They finished the season 13–18, 6–12 in MVC play to finish in seventh place. They advanced to the quarterfinals of the Missouri Valley women's tournament, where they lost to Missouri State.

== Roster ==
2017–18 Bradley Braves women's basketball team
Players
Coaches

| Pos. | # | Name | Height | Year | Previous school | Hometown |
|---|---|---|---|---|---|---|
| F | 00 | Danielle Brewer | 5 ft 10 in (1.78 m) | Sr | Home schooled | Coatsville, IN |
| G | 3 | Gabi Haack | 5 ft 10 in (1.78 m) | Fr | Elk River | Elk River, MN |
| G | 4 | Missy Adrian | 5 ft 11 in (1.8 m) | Fr | Fremd | Rolling Meadows, IL |
| F | 5 | Chelsea Brackmann | 6 ft 1 in (1.85 m) | So | Eisenhower | New Berlin, WI |
| G | 12 | Kellee Clay | 5 ft 6 in (1.68 m) | Jr | Metea Valley | Naperville, IL |
| G | 14 | Ryan Wilkins | 5 ft 5 in (1.65 m) | So | St. Teresa's Academy | Kansas City, MO |
| G | 20 | Shareece Burrell | 5 ft 8 in (1.73 m) | Sr | East | Des Moines, IA |
| G | 23 | Jailynn Lawson | 5 ft 8 in (1.73 m) | Fr | Central | Peoria, IL |
| G | 24 | Shunseere Kent | 5 ft 7 in (1.7 m) | Jr | Hapeville Charter Career Academy; East Georgia State | East Point, GA |
| G | 25 | Amber Bozeman | 5 ft 9 in (1.75 m) | So | Dunlap | Dunlap, IL |
| F | 30 | Emily Marsh | 6 ft 0 in (1.83 m) | Fr | Huron | Superior Township, MI |
| G | 32 | Madison Dellamuth | 5 ft 6 in (1.68 m) | Sr | Prairie | Cedar Rapids, IA |
| G | 33 | Anneke Schlueter | 6 ft 0 in (1.83 m) | Sr | Max-Weber-Schule | Ulm, Germany |
| F | 44 | Vanessa Markert | 6 ft 2 in (1.88 m) | Jr | Brown County | Mount Sterling, IL |
| F | 45 | Nyjah White | 5 ft 11 in (1.8 m) | Fr | Hickman | Columbia, MO |

Head coach

- Andrea Gorski (Bradley)

Assistant coach(es)

- Paul Fessler (Northern Iowa)
- Christena Hamilton (Temple)
- Kristi Zeller (Toledo)

Legend

- (C) Team captain
- (S) Suspended
- (I) Ineligible
- (W) Walk-on
- Injured
- Current redshirt

Roster
Last update: January 3, 2018

== Schedule ==
| Date time, TV | Rank^{#} | Opponent^{#} | Result | Record | Site (attendance) city, state |
Exhibition
| 11/04/2017*; 4:00 pm | | Upper Iowa | W 79–40 | | Renaissance Coliseum (557); Peoria, IL |
Non-conference regular season
| 11/10/2017*; 7:00 pm, ESPN3 | | Omaha | W 69–56 | 1–0 | Renaissance Coliseum (643); Peoria, IL |
| 11/15/2017*; 7:00 pm, ESPN3 | | Lincoln (MO) | W 88–44 | 2–0 | Renaissance Coliseum (646); Peoria, IL |
| 11/18/2017*; 2:00 pm | | at Illinois | L 62–74 | 2–1 | State Farm Center (1,135); Champaign, IL |
| 11/24/2017*; 1:00 pm | | vs. Nicholls State; SEMO Thanksgiving Classic | W 75–65 | 3–1 | Show Me Center (215); Cape Girardeau, MO |
| 11/25/2017*; 3:15 pm | | at Southeast Missouri State; SEMO Thanksgiving Classic | L 53–57 | 3–2 | Show Me Center; Cape Girardeau, MO |
| 11/29/2017*; 6:00 pm, ESPN3 | | at Northern Illinois | L 52–76 | 3–3 | Convocation Center (636); DeKalb, IL |
| 12/02/2017*; 2:00 pm, ESPN3 | | UIC | W 58–48 | 4–3 | Renaissance Coliseum (635); Peoria, IL |
| 12/05/2017*; 6:00 pm | | at Eastern Illinois | W 67–52 | 5–3 | Lantz Arena (379); Charleston, IL |
| 12/16/2017*; 1:00 pm, ESPN3 | | at No. 21 Green Bay | L 40–72 | 5–4 | Kress Events Center (2,239); Green Bay, WI |
| 12/19/2017*; 11:00 am, ESPN3 | | Cleveland State | L 65–67 | 5–5 | Renaissance Coliseum (3,096); Peoria, IL |
| 12/28/2017*; 7:00 pm, ESPN3 | | Western Illinois | W 87–80 | 6–5 | Renaissance Coliseum (854); Peoria, IL |
Missouri Valley Conference regular season
| 12/31/2017; 11:00 am, ESPN3 | | at Illinois State | W 62–42 | 7–5 (1–0) | Redbird Arena (741); Normal, IL |
| 01/05/2018; 7:00 pm, ESPN3 | | at Loyola–Chicago | W 59–57 | 8–5 (2–0) | Joseph J. Gentile Arena (233); Chicago, IL |
| 01/07/2018; 3:00 pm, ESPN3 | | at Valparaiso | W 88–69 | 9–5 (3–0) | Athletics–Recreation Center (322); Valparaiso, IN |
| 01/12/2018; 7:00 pm, ESPN3 | | Southern Illinois | L 62–63 | 9–6 (3–1) | Renaissance Coliseum (927); Peoria, IL |
| 01/14/2018; 2:00 pm, ESPN3 | | Missouri State | L 65–71 | 9–7 (3–2) | Renaissance Coliseum (918); Peoria, IL |
| 01/19/2018; 6:00 pm, ESPN3 | | at Indiana State | L 50–65 | 9–8 (3–3) | Hulman Center (1,791); Terre Haute, IN |
| 01/21/2018; 1:00 pm, ESPN3 | | at Evansville | W 117–59 | 10–8 (4–3) | Meeks Family Fieldhouse (287); Evansville, IN |
| 01/26/2018; 7:00 pm, ESPN3 | | Northern Iowa | L 40–56 | 10–9 (4–4) | Renaissance Coliseum (287); Peoria, IL |
| 01/28/2018; 2:00 pm, ESPN3 | | Drake | L 75–84 | 10–10 (4–5) | Renaissance Coliseum (733); Peoria, IL |
| 02/02/2018; 7:00 pm, ESPN3 | | Valparaiso | W 69–58 | 11–10 (5–5) | Renaissance Coliseum (780); Peoria, IL |
| 02/04/2018; 1:00 pm, ESPN3 | | Loyola–Chicago | L 61–71 | 11–11 (5–6) | Renaissance Coliseum (558); Peoria, IL |
| 02/09/2018; 7:00 pm, ESPN3 | | at Missouri State | L 54–74 | 11–12 (5–7) | JQH Arena (2,417); Springfield, MO |
| 02/11/2018; 11:30 am, ESPN3 | | at Southern Illinois | L 53–62 | 11–13 (5–8) | SIU Arena (757); Carbondale, IL |
| 02/16/2018; 7:00 pm, ESPN3 | | Evansville | W 92–47 | 12–13 (6–8) | Renaissance Coliseum (684); Peoria, IL |
| 02/18/2018; 2:00 pm, ESPN3 | | Indiana State | L 70–74 | 12–15 (6–9) | Renaissance Coliseum (811); Peoria, IL |
| 02/23/2018; 7:00 pm, ESPN3 | | at Drake | L 71–77 | 12–16 (6–10) | Knapp Center (3,922); Des Moines, IA |
| 02/25/2018; 2:00 pm, ESPN3 | | at Northern Iowa | L 50–63 | 12–16 (6–11) | McLeod Center (1,166); Cedar Falls, IA |
| 03/03/2018; 2:00 pm, ESPN3 | | Illinois State | L 41–53 | 12–17 (6–12) | Renaissance Coliseum (810); Peoria, IL |
Missouri Valley Women's Tournament
| 03/08/2018; 7:00 pm, ESPN3 | (7) | vs. (10) Evansville; First Round | W 77–49 | 13–17 | TaxSlayer Center (1,028); Moline, IL |
| 03/09/2018; 6:00 pm, ESPN3 | (7) | vs. (2) Missouri State; Quarterfinals | L 68–76 | 13–18 | TaxSlayer Center; Moline, IL |
*Non-conference game. ^{#}Rankings from AP Poll. (#) Tournament seedings in parentheses. All times are in Central Time.

== See also ==
2017–18 Bradley Braves men's basketball team
