= Jennie Baranczyk =

American basketball coach (born 1982)

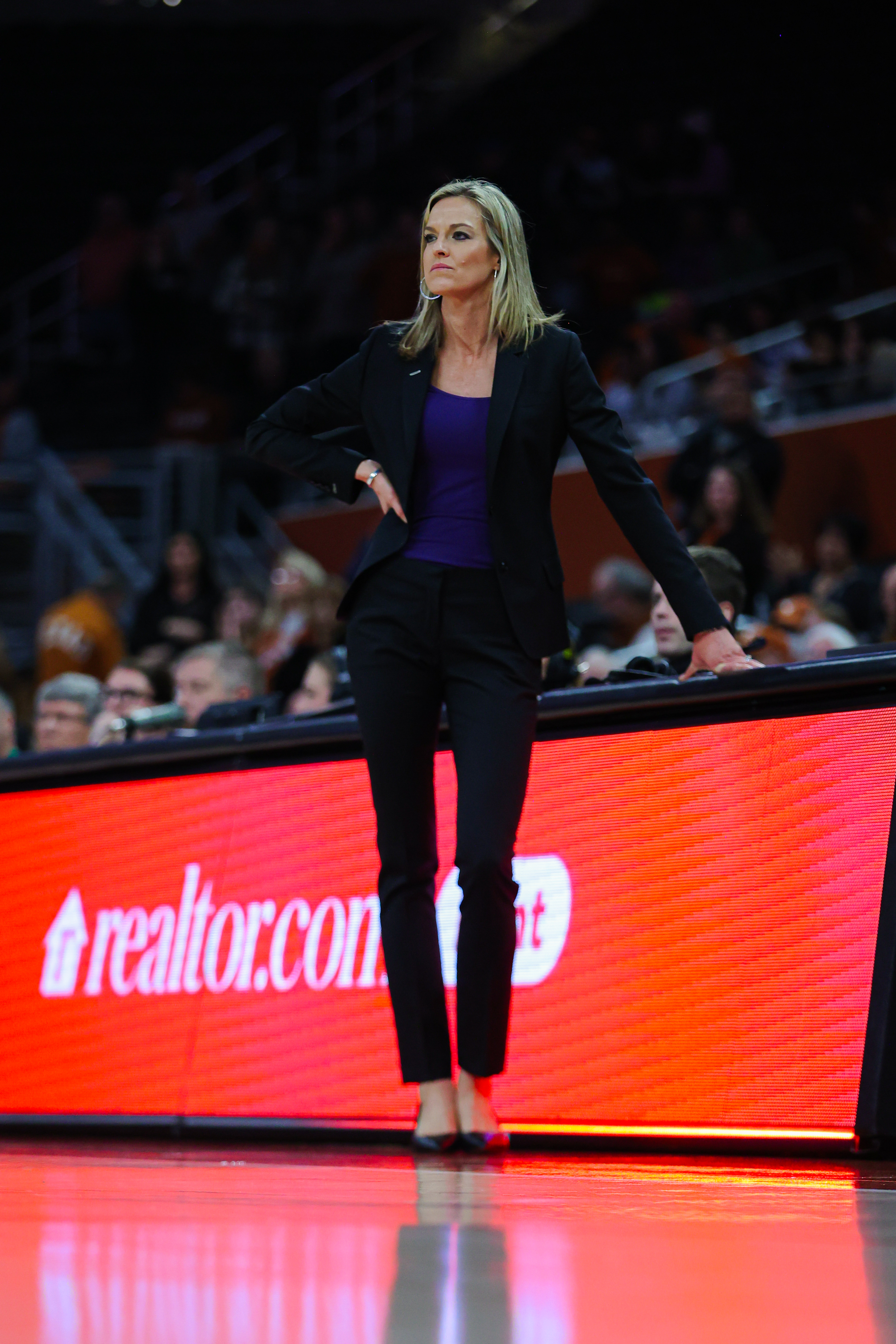

Current position
- Title: Head coach
- Team: Oklahoma
- Conference: SEC
- Record: 127–42 (.751)
- Annual salary: $1,075,000

Biographical details
- Born: February 22, 1982 (age 44); Cedar Rapids, Iowa, U.S.
- Education: Iowa

Playing career
- 2000–2004: Iowa
- Position: Power forward

Coaching career (HC unless noted)

Women's Basketball
- 2004–2006: Kansas State (assistant)
- 2006–2010: Marquette (assistant)
- 2010–2012: Colorado (assistant)
- 2012–2021: Drake
- 2021–present: Oklahoma

Head coaching record
- Overall: 319–138 (.698)

Accomplishments and honors

Championships
- 3× MVC regular season (2017, 2018, 2019); 2× MVC tournament (2017, 2018); 2× Big 12 regular season (2023, 2024)

Awards
- Big 12 Coach of the Year (2024); 2× MVC Coach of the Year (2017, 2018); As player: First-team All-Big Ten (2003); 2× Second-team All-Big Ten (2002, 2004)

Jennie Lillis Baranczyk (born Jennie Marie Lillis; February 22, 1982) is an American basketball coach who is the current head coach of the University of Oklahoma women's basketball team.

== Early life and education ==
Born Jennie Marie Lillis in Cedar Rapids, Iowa, Jennie Baranczyk was raised in Urbandale, Iowa and attended Dowling Catholic High School in nearby West Des Moines, the same high school which Caitlin Clark graduated from. A communications major, Baranczyk attended the University of Iowa and played at forward on the Iowa Hawkeyes women's basketball team under head coach Lisa Bluder from 2000 to 2004. As a senior, Baranczyk averaged 16.0 points and 6.2 rebounds and was a second-team All-Big Ten selection. She also earned second-team All-Big Ten honors in 2002 and first-team honors in 2003, in addition to being a Women's Basketball Coaches Association Region 6 honorable mention All-American, and was an academic All-Big Ten honoree from 2002 to 2004. Baranczyk won the Big Ten's Medal of Honor for academic and athletic excellence upon graduating from Iowa in 2004.

Legend
GP	Games played	GS	Games started	MPG	Minutes per game
FG%	Field goal percentage	3P%	3-point field goal percentage	FT%	Free throw percentage
RPG	Rebounds per game	APG	Assists per game	SPG	Steals per game
BPG	Blocks per game	PPG	Points per game	**Bold**	Career high

Year	Team	GP	Points	FG%	3P%	FT%	RPG	APG	SPG	BPG	PPG
2000–01	Iowa	31	333	49.0%	0.0%	62.6%	**7.6**	1.8	1.1	0.8	10.7
2001–02	Iowa	29	429	**53.7%**	33.3%	79.0%	6.0	2.6	1.2	0.8	14.8
2002–03	Iowa	**33**	**537**	48.2%	**41.7%**	77.0%	7.2	2.2	**2.0**	**1.2**	**16.3**
2003–04	Iowa	29	463	43.4%	36.6%	**81.7%**	6.2	**3.2**	1.9	0.9	16.0
Career		122	1762	48.2%	36.0%	75.5%	6.8	2.4	1.6	0.9	14.4

== Coaching career ==
Baranczyk began her coaching career in 2004 at Kansas State under Deb Patterson and helped Kansas State win the 2006 WNIT. From 2006 to 2010, Baranczyk was an assistant at Marquette under Terri Mitchell, including Marquette's 2008 WNIT title. At Marquette, Baranczyk also helped with recruiting, game scheduling, opponent scouting, and public relations. The first hire on the new coaching staff, Baranczyk then was an assistant at Colorado under Linda Lappe beginning on May 10, 2010.

=== Drake ===
On April 17, 2012, Drake University in Des Moines, Iowa hired Baranczyk as head women's basketball coach. Drake went 11–20 in Baranczyk's first season and improved to 17–15 in the 2013–14 season. Baranczyk followed that season by leading Drake to a 20–11 record and the first round of the 2015 WNIT, the first postseason appearance in her tenure. In 2016, Drake improved to 23–10 and advanced to the second round of the WNIT.

The 2016–17 season was the most successful in Baranczyk's tenure, as Drake reached a 28–5 record that included a program and Missouri Valley Conference (MVC) record 22-game winning streak and 18–0 MVC record, the first team in the MVC to go undefeated in conference play. Drake won its first conference title since 2008 and first outright title since 2000. Drake went on to win the MVC tournament for the first time since 2007 and qualified for the NCAA tournament.

=== Oklahoma ===
Baranczyk was named head coach at Oklahoma on April 10, 2021, after nine years at Drake. In her first three years, she led Oklahoma into the second round of the NCAA Tournament. She delivered a Big 12 Conference regular season championship to the Sooners in 2022–23, the program's first in 15 years. The next season, Baranczyk and OU won their second consecutive conference title despite a 6-5 non-conference record, posting a 15–3 record in Big 12 play to win the title outright. She was named the Big 12's Coach of the Year in 2024 and coached Big 12 Player of the Year Skylar Vann and the Big 12 Newcomer of the Year Payton Verhulst.

In 2025, Baranczyk coached Oklahoma to a 25–7 overall record and an 11–5 record in conference play during their first season as a member of the SEC. The Sooners earned a 3-seed in the NCAA Tournament and hosted the first two rounds at the Lloyd Noble Center, drawing over 8,000 fans. They defeated Florida Gulf Coast in the First Round and Iowa in the Second Round before losing to UConn in the Sweet Sixteen to end their season.

She became the first Oklahoma head coach to be named a National Coach of the Year finalist in each of their first three seasons.

== Personal life ==
Formerly Jennie Lillis, Baranczyk married Scott Baranczyk in 2009. They have three children.

== Head coaching record ==
Record table
Season	Team	Overall	Conference	Standing	Postseason
Drake Bulldogs (Missouri Valley Conference) (2012–2021)
2012–13	Drake	11–20	5–13	9th	
2013–14	Drake	17–15	9–9	5th	
2014–15	Drake	20–11	15–3	2nd	WNIT First Round
2015–16	Drake	23–10	14–4	T–2nd	WNIT Second Round
2016–17	Drake	28–5	18–0	1st	NCAA First Round
2017–18	Drake	26–8	18–0	1st	NCAA First Round
2018–19	Drake	27–7	17–1	1st	NCAA First Round
2019–20	Drake	22–8	14–4	2nd	Postseason not held
2020–21	Drake	18–12	13–5	2nd	WNIT First Round
Drake:		192–96 (.667)	123–39 (.759)		
Oklahoma Sooners (Big 12 Conference) (2021–2024)
2021–22	Oklahoma	25–9	12–6	4th	NCAA Second Round
2022–23	Oklahoma	26–7	14–4	T–1st	NCAA Second Round
2023–24	Oklahoma	23–10	15–3	1st	NCAA Second Round
Oklahoma (Big 12):		74–26 (.740)	41–13 (.759)		
Oklahoma Sooners (Southeastern Conference) (2024–present)
2024–25	Oklahoma	27–8	11–5	T–4th	NCAA Sweet Sixteen
2025–26	Oklahoma	26–8	11–5	5th	NCAA Sweet Sixteen
Oklahoma (SEC):		53–16 (.768)	22–10 (.688)		
Oklahoma (Overall):		127–42 (.751)	54–19 (.740)		
Total:		319–138 (.698)			
National champion Postseason invitational champion Conference regular season champion Conference regular season and conference tournament champion Division regular season champion Division regular season and conference tournament champion Conference tournament champion
