= Ladywood High School =

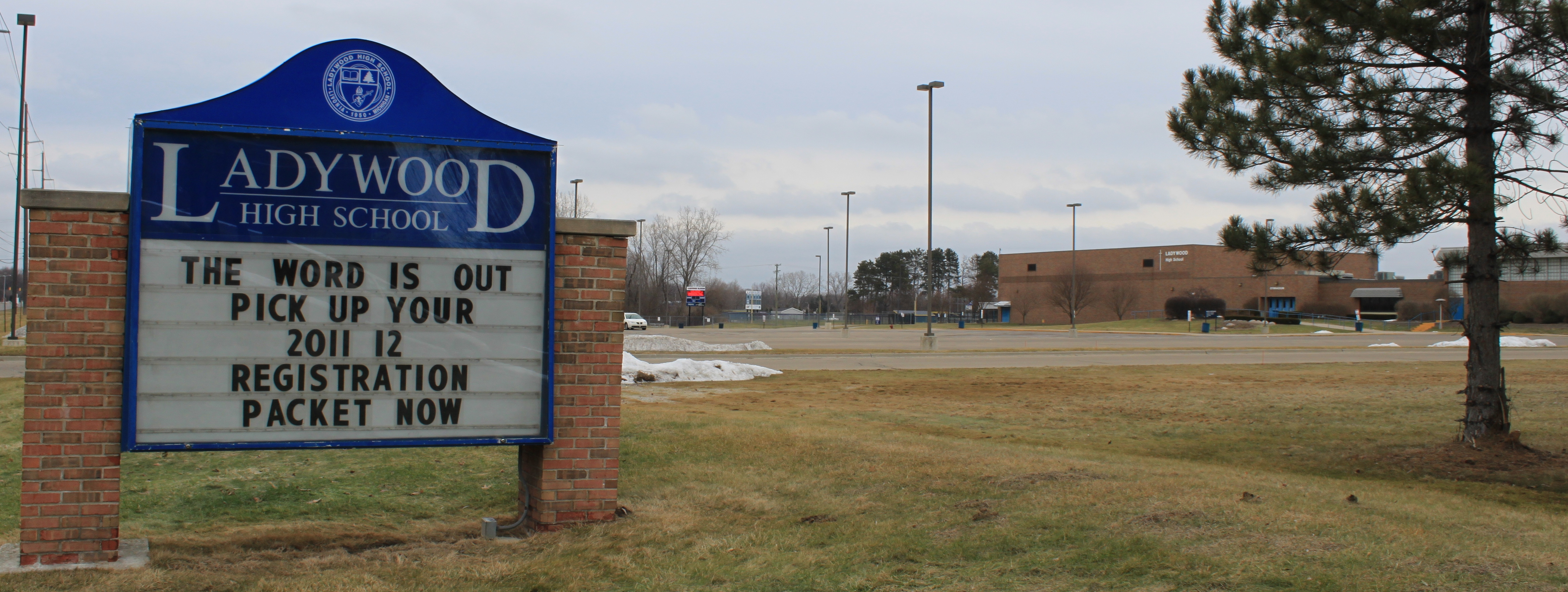

Location
- 14680 Newburgh Road; Livonia, Michigan 48154; United States
- Coordinates: 42°23′30″N 83°24′39″W

Information
- Type: Private, all-female
- Religious affiliation: Roman Catholic
- Established: 1950
- Closed: 2018
- Head of school: Tracey Mocon
- Grades: 9–12
- Colors: Royal Blue and White
- Athletics conference: Catholic High School League
- Nickname: Blazers
- Rival: Marlins, Mercy High School
- Accreditation: North Central Association of Colleges and Schools
- Tuition: $9,600
- Website: www.ladywood.org

Ladywood High School was a private, Roman Catholic, all-girls high school in Livonia, Michigan. It was located in the Roman Catholic Archdiocese of Detroit.

It opened in 1950. From 2005 to 2017 the number of students declined by 60%, with 169 students in 2017. In December 2017, the archdiocese announced that Ladywood High School would close at the end of the 2017–2018 school year.

== Operations ==
Ladywood High School was associated with the Felician Sisters, an organization that also owns nearby Madonna University. The Ladywood High School Campus was purchased by Madonna University following its closure in 2018.

In 2017 the yearly tuition was $11,000.

Ann Zaniewski of the Detroit Free Press wrote in 2017 that it was "known for its rigorous academics and strong athletic programs".
