= Liberty Christian School (Anderson, Indiana) =

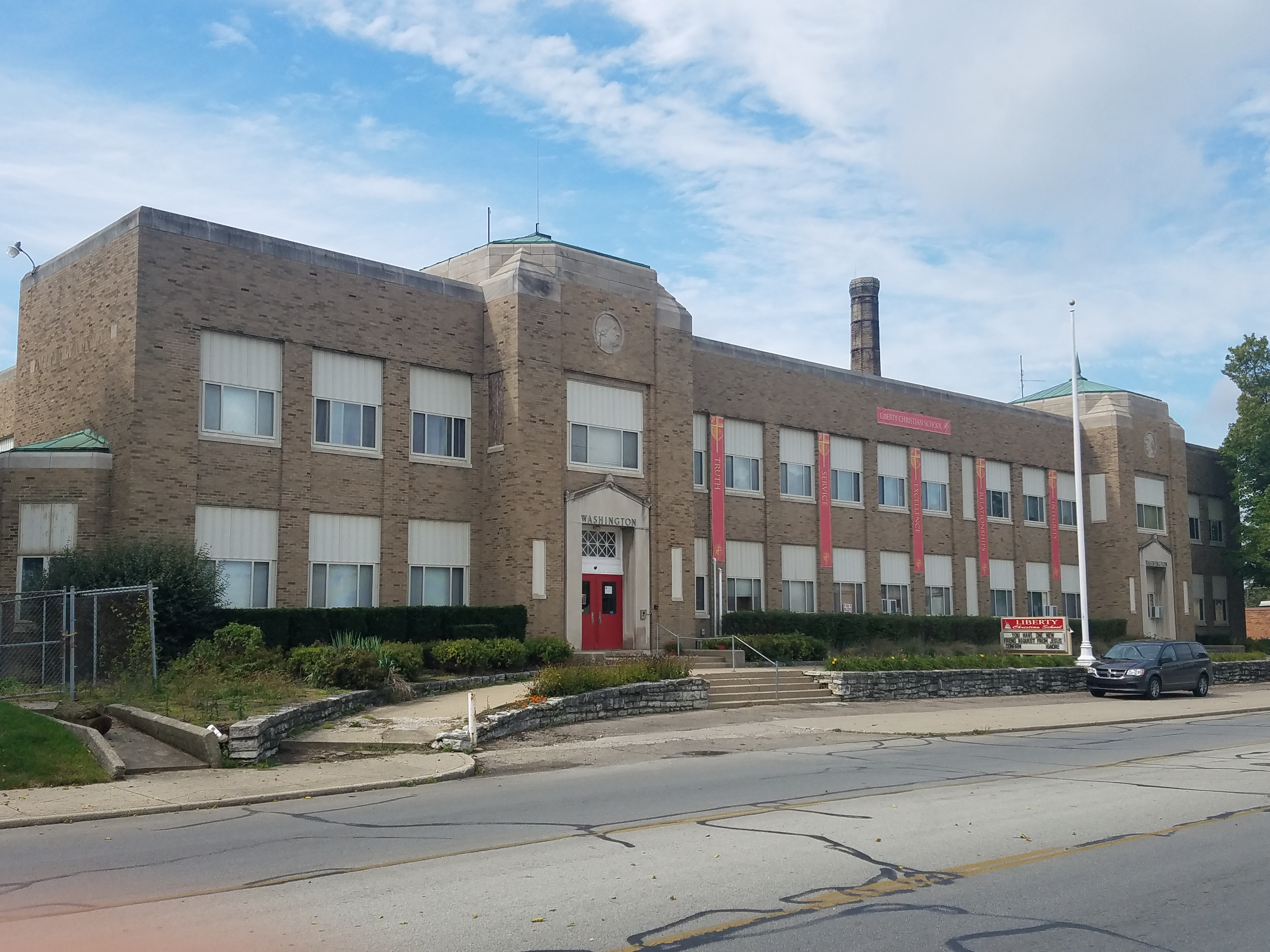

Location
- 2323 Columbus Ave (Washington Campus); 2025 Hillcrest Drive (Hillcrest Campus); Anderson, Madison County, Indiana 46016; United States; 40.092870°N 85.667498°W

Information
- School type: Private Christian
- Religious affiliation: Non-denominational Christian
- Established: 1976
- Superintendent: Adam Freeman
- Principal: Dr. Jason Smith (Secondary); Dr. Brian Ramsey (Elementary)
- Staff: 80
- Faculty: 44
- Grades: Preschool–12
- Enrollment: 388 (2023–2024)
- Student to teacher ratio: 10:1
- Campus size: Two campuses
- Campus type: Suburban
- Color: Red Gold
- Athletics conference: Pioneer Conference
- Nickname: Lions
- Accreditation: Association of Christian Schools International (ACSI)
- Tuition: $8,464 (highest grade, 2024)
- Website: www.libertyonline.org

Liberty Christian School (LCS) is a private, non-denominational Christian school in Anderson, Indiana, serving students from preschool through 12th grade. Founded in 1976, the school operates two campuses: the Hillcrest Campus for preschool through 6th grade and the Washington Campus for grades 7–12. With a mission to provide a Christ-centered education based on biblical truth, LCS emphasizes academic rigor, spiritual development, and community service. The school is governed by a self-electing board and maintains a strong family-oriented atmosphere, as noted by students, parents, and faculty.

LCS is accredited by the Association of Christian Schools International (ACSI) and holds memberships with School Choice Indiana and the Indiana High School Athletic Association (IHSAA). It ranks in the top 20% of Indiana private schools for its low acceptance rate (76%), large student body, and extensive sports and extracurricular offerings.

== History ==
Liberty Christian School was established in 1976 by a community committee that planned and prayed for over a year. Initially serving 24 students in kindergarten through 4th grade, the school operated in a building owned by the Church of the Brethren on McKinley Street with four full-time teachers, including Gwelda Walker, who served as the first principal without compensation. Between 1977 and 1979, LCS expanded to include grades 5–8 and preschool, utilizing additional facilities from South Meridian Church of God and Mounds Baptist Church. In 1981, the school purchased the former Fall Creek Heights School on South Rangeline Road for $40,000 and added 9th grade. The Washington Campus, formerly Anderson School Corporation's Washington Elementary, was acquired in 1982 for $81,000. LCS celebrated its first graduating class of three students in 1985, all of whom pursued college education. In 2000, the Hillcrest Campus was purchased from United Auto Workers’ Local 662 for $785,000 and opened in 2002 after volunteer-led refurbishments. As of 2025, LCS serves 388 students across three buildings: Little Lions Preschool, Hillcrest Campus (K–6), and Washington Campus (7–12), with 633 alumni and 80 staff members.

== Academics ==
LCS offers a comprehensive curriculum rooted in biblical principles, designed to prepare students for college and lifelong learning. Elementary education (preschool–6th grade) includes language arts, writing, mathematics, science, and history, while secondary education (7th–12th grade) covers algebra, biology, fine arts, Bible studies, physical education, geography, and honors courses in keyboarding, health, foreign language, and social studies. The school maintains a student-teacher ratio of 10:1, fostering individualized attention. Approximately 80% of LCS graduates enroll in 4-year colleges, reflecting strong college preparatory outcomes. After-school care is available for students in preschool through 8th grade, and the school provides guidance on graduation requirements and scholarship opportunities. While praised for its spiritual and academic foundation, some former students have noted limitations in academic rigor and exposure to diverse perspectives, citing a conservative Protestant worldview.

== Athletics ==
Liberty Christian School competes in the Pioneer Conference under the nickname "Lions." The Washington Campus offers 10 intercholastic sports for middle and high school students, ranking in the top 20% of Indiana private schools for sports offerings:

- Archery (through NASP)
- Baseball
- Basketball
- Cheerleading
- Cross country
- Golf
- Soccer
- Softball
- Swimming
- Track and field
- Volleyball

The Lions won the 2015–16 IHSAA Class 1A Boys Basketball State Championship, a significant achievement in the school's athletic history. Recent athletic highlights include participation in the Madison County Championship (basketball, January 2025) and the IHSAA 3A Regional 27 Final (girls’ basketball, March 2024).

== Extracurricular activities ==
LCS offers a wide range of extracurricular activities, ranking in the top 20% of Indiana private schools for its offerings. The fine arts department organizes dramatic, musical, and visual arts workshops, fostering creative expression. Numerous clubs and programs cater to diverse student interests, and the school emphasizes community service as a core value, encouraging students to engage in local outreach initiatives. An alumni association supports graduates, maintaining strong ties to the school community. Students report a vibrant campus life, with opportunities to develop leadership and teamwork skills through extracurricular involvement.

== Community and reputation ==
Liberty Christian School is noted for its close-knit, family-oriented environment, often described as a hallmark of its culture. Parents and students praise the school for its dedicated teachers, spiritual guidance, and preparation for college and future careers. Testimonials highlight personal growth, with students crediting LCS for strengthening their faith and character. The school's commitment to Christian discipleship and community service resonates with families, as evidenced by alumni who choose to enroll their own children. However, some reviews express concerns about academic quality, faculty turnover, and a lack of exposure to diverse viewpoints, suggesting areas for improvement.

== Admissions ==
LCS operates a year-round enrollment process, welcoming applications for preschool through 12th grade. The admissions process is designed to be accessible, with an online application system and opportunities for families to visit campuses and meet faculty. The school's acceptance rate is 76%, lower than the national average of 88%, indicating selective admissions. Tuition for the highest grade offered is $8,464 (2024), with grants and financial aid programs available to offset costs. The school encourages prospective families to engage with current students and staff to experience its Christ-centered community firsthand.

== See also ==
- List of high schools in Indiana
- Association of Christian Schools International
- Indiana High School Athletic Association
