= Tracey Dorow =

American basketball player and coach

Tracey Dorow is a women's basketball coach who served as the head women's basketball coach for Valparaiso University for six seasons at the helm with an overall record 56-129. In 2016, she received a contract extension through 2017–18. She was relieved of duty in March 2018. She then went on to coach St. Joseph High School. Prior to joining the Beacons, she coached the Ferris State Bulldogs women's basketball team for 14 years. She also served as an assistant coach at Lake Michigan Community College and as a graduate assistant at the University of Indianapolis.

Dorow played at Illinois State University and Northern Michigan University. She received her bachelor's degree at Western Michigan University and her master's degree at the University of Indianapolis.
