= Vibrant Arena at The MARK =

Arena in Illinois, United States

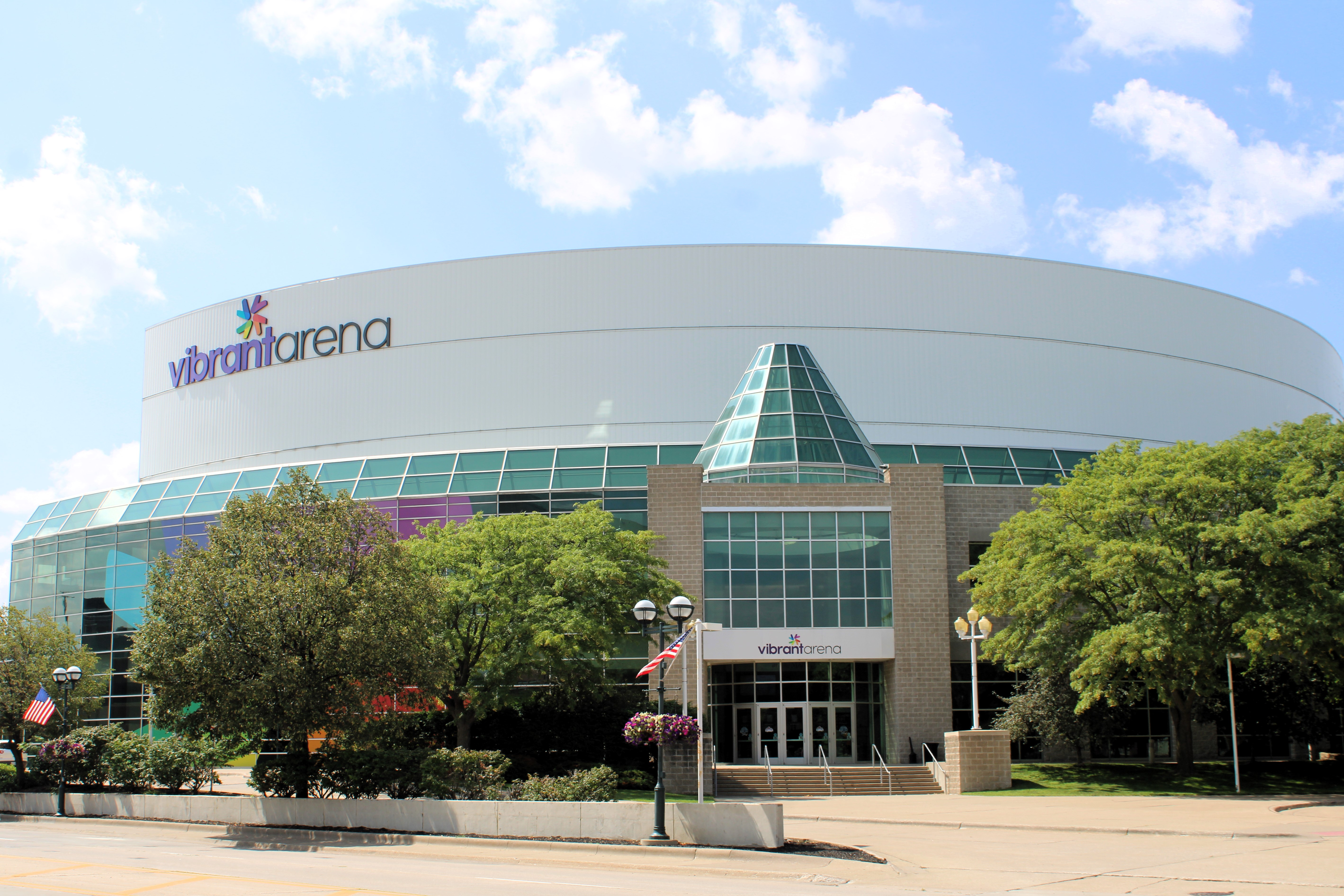
- Vibrant Arena in 2023

- Location within Illinois Location within the United States
- Former names: The MARK of the Quad Cities (1993–2007) iWireless Center (2007–2017); TaxSlayer Center (2017–2022)
- Address: 1201 River Drive
- Location: Moline, Illinois, U.S.
- Coordinates: 41.507837°N 90.520437°W
- Owner: Quad City Civic Center Authority
- Capacity: 12,000 (concerts); 3,000 (theater concerts); 6,000 (amphitheater concerts); 9,200 (hockey)
- Public transit: Quad Cities MetroLINK

Construction
- Groundbreaking: October 17, 1991
- Opened: May 28, 1993
- Cost: $33.4 million ($79 million in 2025 dollars)
- Architect: Ellerbe Becket
- Project manager: National Sports Services
- Services engineer: KJWW Engineering Consultants
- General contractor: Huber Hunt & Nichols Inc.

Tenants
- Quad City Thunder (CBA) (1993–2001); Quad City Mallards (CoHL/UHL) (1995–2007); Quad City Steamwheelers (AF2) (2000–2009); Quad City Flames (AHL) (2007–2009); Quad City Mallards (IHL/CHL/ECHL) (2009–2018); Quad City Steamwheelers (CIF/IFL) (2018–2019, 2022–present); Quad City Storm (SPHL) (2018–present)

Website
- vibrantarena.com

The Vibrant Arena at The MARK, formerly known as The MARK of the Quad Cities, the iWireless Center, and the TaxSlayer Center, is a 12,000-seat multi-purpose arena located in Moline, Illinois. The facility opened in May 1993, under the name The MARK of the Quad Cities with the singer Neil Diamond as the opening act. The facility was renamed as the TaxSlayer Center on October 1, 2017. The arena started using its current name on September 1, 2022.

It is the home to the revived Quad City Steamwheelers of the Indoor Football League and the Quad City Storm of the SPHL.

== Sporting events ==
The arena has hosted NCAA Division I college basketball games (including the Mid-Continent Conference men's basketball tournament from 1996 to 1999) in addition to several NHL and NBA exhibition contests. The Missouri Valley Conference has hosted their Women's Basketball Tournament at the venue since 2016. The now-defunct Quad City Thunder basketball team played all their home games at the TaxSlayer Center from 1993 until the Continental Basketball Association folded eight years later.

Hockey has also been played at the arena since 1995. The Quad City Mallards of the United Hockey League played the first 12 years. They were replaced by the Quad City Flames of the American Hockey League for two seasons before moving to Abbotsford, British Columbia. After the Flames left, the Quad City Mallards were reincarnated in 2009 and played home games at the arena until 2018. In May 2018, two months after the Quad City Mallards ceased operations, TaxSlayer Center director Scott Mullen and former Mallards' owner Howard Cornfield announced a Southern Professional Hockey League team called the Quad City Storm would play the 2018–19 season.

On Sunday, June 15, 1997, the arena hosted World Championship Wrestling's Great American Bash pay-per-view

In 2009, Western Illinois University's club hockey team, the Fighting Leathernecks, began playing there for four games per season.

From 2000 to 2009, the arena played host to arena football as the home of the af2's Quad City Steamwheelers, who won the first two Arena Cup championships in league history (the arena hosted both games at the time). The Steamwheelers came back in 2018 in Champions Indoor Football (CIF) before joining the Indoor Football League (IFL) for the 2019 season.

== Configuration ==
The arena seats up to 12,000 for end-stage concerts along with center-stage concerts. It takes only six hours to convert the center into a theater (called The Theater at the TaxSlayer Center). The seating capacity is 3,000 for theater shows, including Broadway shows, concerts and family shows; and 6,000 for amphitheater concerts.

The center has also hosted professional wrestling events, including the 1997 Great American Bash and 2015 King of the Ring pay-per-views, and numerous broadcasts of World Wrestling Entertainment programming, including Raw, ECW and SmackDown. The arena also hosted WWE The Shield's Final Chapter on April 21, 2019.

The arena contains 31,000 square feet (2,900 m^{2}) of arena floor space, allowing the arena to be used for trade shows and conventions; adjacent is 20,000 square feet (2,000 m^{2}) of meeting room space and an 11,000-square-foot (1,000 m^{2}) lobby. The attendance record was set in 1996, when more than 12,000 people viewed Neil Diamond's concert.

== Naming rights ==
In August 2005, iWireless (formerly Iowa Wireless, a T-Mobile affiliate), announced a 10-year agreement with The MARK (former name) and the Illinois Quad City Civic Center Authority to secure naming rights to the arena. The name change to the "iWireless Center" occurred July 19, 2007. The naming rights agreement with iWireless was intended to be extended for two more years in July 2017. However, a new sponsor, TaxSlayer, an online tax and finance firm, bought the rights in 2017. In September of that same year, TaxSlayer Chief Marketing Officer Chris Moloney announced at a press conference that the company had signed a long-term agreement to be the title sponsor of the venue, which would now be called the TaxSlayer Center beginning on October 1, 2017. On August 17, 2022, the arena announced a new naming rights deal with Vibrant Credit Union. The new name of the arena, Vibrant Arena at The MARK, took effect on September 1, 2022.

== See also ==
- List of convention centers in the United States
