= 1998–99 Lafayette Leopards men's basketball team =

American college basketball season

1998–99 Lafayette Leopards men's basketball

Patriot League tournament champions

NCAA tournament
- Conference: Patriot League
- Record: 22–8 (10–2 Patriot)
- Head coach: Fran O'Hanlon (4th season)
- Home arena: Kirby Sports Center

1998–99 Patriot League men's basketball standings
	Conf.				Overall
Team	W		L	PCT	W		L	PCT
Lafayette †	10	–	2	.833	22	–	8	.733
Navy	9	–	3	.750	20	–	7	.741
Bucknell	9	–	3	.750	16	–	13	.552
Colgate	7	–	5	.583	14	–	14	.500
Army	4	–	8	.333	8	–	19	.296
Holy Cross	3	–	9	.250	7	–	20	.259
Lehigh	0	–	12	.000	6	–	22	.214
† 1999 Patriot League tournament winner

Lafayette Leopards wordmark

The 1998–99 Lafayette Leopards men's basketball team represented Lafayette College during the 1998–99 NCAA Division I men's basketball season. The Leopards, led by 4th year head coach Fran O'Hanlon, played their home games at the Kirby Sports Center and were members of the Patriot League. They finished the season 22–8, 10–2 in Patriot League play to finish tied for first place. They defeated Army, Lehigh, and Navy to win the Patriot League tournament to receive an automatic bid to the NCAA tournament. As No. 15 seed in the East region, they lost in the opening round to No. 2 seed Miami (FL).

== Roster ==
1998–99 Lafayette Leopards men's basketball team
Players
Coaches

Pos.	#	Name	Height	Weight	Year	Hometown
G	32	Brian Ehlers	6 ft 4 in (1.93 m)	195 lb (88 kg)	Jr	Bay Shore, New York
C	34	Stefan Ciosici	6 ft 11 in (2.11 m)	265 lb (120 kg)	Jr

Head coach

- Fran O'Hanlon

Assistant coach(es)

Legend

- (C) Team captain
- (S) Suspended
- (I) Ineligible
- (W) Walk-on
- Injured
- Current redshirt

== Schedule and results ==
Date time, TV	Rank^{#}	Opponent^{#}	Result	Record	Site (attendance) city, state
Regular season
Nov 14, 1998*		at Dartmouth	W 56–41	1–0	Leede Arena; Hanover, New Hampshire
Nov 18, 1998*		Princeton	W 63–47	2–0	Allan P. Kirby Field House; Easton, Pennsylvania
Nov 22, 1998*		at No. 15 Purdue	L 67–72	2–1	Mackey Arena; West Lafayette, Indiana
Nov 29, 1998*		at Saint Peter's	W 76–66	3–1	Yanitelli Center; Jersey City, New Jersey
Dec 2, 1998*		Swarthmore	W 75–56	4–1	Allan P. Kirby Field House; Easton, Pennsylvania
Dec 5, 1998*		at Howard	W 68–55	5–1	Burr Gymnasium; Washington, D.C.
Dec 10, 1998*		Columbia	W 81–61	6–1	Allan P. Kirby Field House; Easton, Pennsylvania
Dec 12, 1998*		vs. Delaware; Desmond Conference Challenge	L 78–92	6–2	Pepsi Arena; Albany, New York
Dec 22, 1998*		at Towson	W 76–69	7–2	Towson Center; Towson, Maryland
Dec 29, 1998*		vs. Troy State; Gossner Classic	W 80–77	8–2	Smith Spectrum; Logan, Utah
Dec 30, 1998*		at Utah State; Gossner Classic	L 67–85	8–3	Smith Spectrum; Logan, Utah
Jan 5, 1999*		Penn	L 62–74	8–4	Allan P. Kirby Field House; Easton, Pennsylvania
Jan 9, 1999		at Navy	W 72–66	9–4 (1–0)	Alumni Hall; Annapolis, Maryland
Jan 13, 1999		Holy Cross	W 76–64	10–4 (2–0)	Allan P. Kirby Field House; Easton, Pennsylvania
Jan 16, 1999		Army	W 82–78	11–4 (3–0)	Allan P. Kirby Field House; Easton, Pennsylvania
Jan 18, 1999*		at Cornell	W 72–54	12–4	Newman Arena; Ithaca, New York
Jan 20, 1999		at Lehigh	W 73–70	13–4 (4–0)	Stabler Arena; Bethlehem, Pennsylvania
Jan 23, 1999		Colgate	L 57–65	13–5 (4–1)	Allan P. Kirby Field House; Easton, Pennsylvania
Jan 25, 1999*		at Rutgers	L 64–84	13–6	Louis Brown Athletic Center; Piscataway, New Jersey
Jan 27, 1999		at Bucknell	W 66–65	14–6 (5–1)	Davis Gym; Lewisburg, Pennsylvania
Feb 1, 1999*		Haverford	W 96–62	15–6	Allan P. Kirby Field House; Easton, Pennsylvania
Feb 3, 1999		Navy	W 74–71	16–6 (6–1)	Allan P. Kirby Field House; Easton, Pennsylvania
Feb 6, 1999		at Holy Cross	W 79–65	17–6 (7–1)	Hart Center; Worcester, Massachusetts
Feb 10, 1999		at Army	W 89–59	18–6 (8–1)	Christl Arena; West Point, New York
Feb 14, 1999		Lehigh	W 85–49	19–6 (9–1)	Allan P. Kirby Field House; Easton, Pennsylvania
Feb 17, 1999		at Colgate	L 46–47	19–7 (9–2)	Cotterell Court; Hamilton, New York
Feb 21, 1999		Bucknell	W 67–63	20–7 (10–2)	Allan P. Kirby Field House; Easton, Pennsylvania
Patriot League Tournament
Feb 28, 1999*	(1)	vs. (4) Colgate; Semifinals	W 73–71	21–7	Christl Arena; West Point, New York
Mar 5, 1999*	(1)	(3) Bucknell; Championship game	W 67–63	22–7	Allan P. Kirby Field House; Easton, Pennsylvania
NCAA Tournament
Mar 12, 1999*; CBS	(15 E)	vs. (2 E) No. 10 Miami (FL); First round	L 54–75	22–8	FleetCenter (18,908); Boston, Massachusetts
*Non-conference game. ^{#}Rankings from AP Poll. (#) Tournament seedings in parentheses. E=East. All times are in Eastern Time.

== Awards and honors ==
- Brian Ehlers – Patriot League Player of the Year
