= 1999–2000 Lafayette Leopards men's basketball team =

American college basketball season

1999–2000 Lafayette Leopards men's basketball

Patriot League tournament champions

NCAA tournament
- Conference: Patriot League
- Record: 24–7 (11–1 Patriot)
- Head coach: Fran O'Hanlon (5th season)
- Home arena: Kirby Sports Center

1999–2000 Patriot League men's basketball standings
| | Conf. | | | | Overall |
| Team | W | | L | PCT | W | | L | PCT |
|---|---|---|---|---|---|---|---|---|
| Navy | 11 | – | 1 | .917 | 23 | – | 6 | .793 |
| Lafayette † | 11 | – | 1 | .917 | 24 | – | 7 | .774 |
| Bucknell | 8 | – | 4 | .667 | 17 | – | 11 | .607 |
| Colgate | 4 | – | 8 | .333 | 13 | – | 16 | .448 |
| Holy Cross | 3 | – | 9 | .250 | 10 | – | 18 | .357 |
| Lehigh | 3 | – | 9 | .250 | 8 | – | 21 | .276 |
| Army | 2 | – | 10 | .167 | 5 | – | 23 | .179 |
† 2000 Patriot League tournament winner

The 1999–2000 Lafayette Leopards men's basketball team represented Lafayette College during the 1999–2000 NCAA Division I men's basketball season. The Leopards, led by 5th year head coach Fran O'Hanlon, played their home games at the Kirby Sports Center and were members of the Patriot League. They finished the season 24–7, 11–1 in Patriot League play to finish tied for first place. They defeated Army, Lehigh, and Navy to win the Patriot League tournament to receive an automatic bid to the NCAA tournament. As No. 15 seed in the East region, they lost in the opening round to No. 2 seed Temple.

== Roster ==
1999–2000 Lafayette Leopards men's basketball team
Players
Coaches

| Pos. | # | Name | Height | Weight | Year | Hometown |
|---|---|---|---|---|---|---|
| G | 32 | Brian Ehlers | 6 ft 4 in (1.93 m) | 195 lb (88 kg) | Sr | Bay Shore, New York |
| C | 34 | Stefan Ciosici | 6 ft 11 in (2.11 m) | 265 lb (120 kg) | Sr |

Head coach

- Fran O'Hanlon

Assistant coach(es)

Legend

- (C) Team captain
- (S) Suspended
- (I) Ineligible
- (W) Walk-on
- Injured
- Current redshirt

== Schedule and results ==
| Date time, TV | Rank^{#} | Opponent^{#} | Result | Record | Site (attendance) city, state |
Regular Season
| Nov 20, 1999* | | at Columbia | W 59–52 | 1–0 | Levien Gymnasium (1,300); New York, New York |
| Nov 23, 1999* | | at Villanova | L 70–74 | 1–1 | The Pavilion (6,500); Philadelphia, Pennsylvania |
| Nov 29, 1999* | | Cornell | W 65–54 | 2–1 | Kirby Sports Center (2,287); Easton, Pennsylvania |
| Dec 1, 1999* | | at Howard | W 64–55 | 3–1 | Burr Gymnasium (507); Washington, D.C. |
| Dec 6, 1999* | | Towson | L 57–59 | 3–2 | Kirby Sports Center (1,931); Easton, Pennsylvania |
| Dec 11, 1999* | | Saint Peter's | W 81–69 | 4–2 | Kirby Sports Center (1,859); Easton, Pennsylvania |
| Dec 21, 1999* | | Gettysburg | W 82–52 | 5–2 | Kirby Sports Center (1,012); Easton, Pennsylvania |
| Dec 29, 1999* | | vs. Saint Joseph's | L 81–83 ^{2OT} | 5–3 | The Pit (16,533); Albuquerque, New Mexico |
| Dec 30, 1999* | | vs. Alabama State | W 88–54 | 6–3 | The Pit (16,861); Albuquerque, New Mexico |
| Jan 2, 2000* | | at Georgia Tech | L 64–75 | 6–4 | Alexander Memorial Coliseum (4,120); Atlanta, Georgia |
| Jan 5, 2000* | | Delaware Valley | W 76–58 | 7–4 | Kirby Sports Center (551); Easton, Pennsylvania |
| Jan 8, 2000* | | at Princeton | W 70–69 ^{OT} | 8–4 | Jadwin Gymnasium (6,432); Princeton, New Jersey |
| Jan 11, 2000* | | at Penn | L 76–80 | 8–5 | The Palestra (3,852); Philadelphia, Pennsylvania |
| Jan 16, 2000 | | Navy | W 80–74 | 9–5 (1–0) | Kirby Sports Center (2,882); Easton, Pennsylvania |
| Jan 19, 2000 | | at Holy Cross | W 77–70 | 10–5 (2–0) | Hart Center (714); Worcester, Massachusetts |
| Jan 22, 2000 | | at Army | W 77–55 | 11–5 (3–0) | Christl Arena (1,150); West Point, New York |
| Jan 26, 2000 | | Lehigh | W 87–68 | 12–5 (4–0) | Kirby Sports Center (3,171); Easton, Pennsylvania |
| Jan 29, 2000 | | at Colgate | W 64–58 | 13–5 (5–0) | Cotterell Court (925); Hamilton, New York |
| Feb 2, 2000 | | Bucknell | W 75–73 | 14–5 (6–0) | Kirby Sports Center (3,211); Easton, Pennsylvania |
| Feb 7, 2000* | | Albany | W 90–70 | 15–5 | Kirby Sports Center (1,911); Easton, Pennsylvania |
| Feb 9, 2000 | | at Navy | L 66–94 | 15–6 (6–1) | Alumni Hall (3,871); Annapolis, Maryland |
| Feb 12, 2000 | | Holy Cross | W 77–66 | 16–6 (7–1) | Kirby Sports Center (3,218); Easton, Pennsylvania |
| Feb 14, 2000* | | at Stony Brook | W 71–69 | 17–6 | Stony Brook University Arena (1,293); Stony Brook, New York |
| Feb 16, 2000 | | Army | W 69–43 | 18–6 (8–1) | Kirby Sports Center (1,541); Easton, Pennsylvania |
| Feb 19, 2000 | | at Lehigh | W 77–63 | 19–6 (9–1) | Stabler Arena (3,221); Bethlehem, Pennsylvania |
| Feb 23, 2000 | | Colgate | W 92–51 | 20–6 (10–1) | Kirby Sports Center (2,814); Easton, Pennsylvania |
| Feb 27, 2000 | | at Bucknell | W 74–59 | 21–6 (11–1) | Davis Gym (2,413); Lewisburg, Pennsylvania |
Patriot League Tournament
| Mar 4, 2000* | | Army; Quarterfinals | W 71–45 | 22–6 | Kirby Sports Center (3,055); Easton, Pennsylvania |
| Mar 5, 2000* | | Lehigh; Semifinals | W 66–60 | 23–6 | Kirby Sports Center (3,648); Easton, Pennsylvania |
| Mar 10, 2000* | | Navy; Championship game | W 87–61 | 24–6 | Kirby Sports Center (4,021); Easton, Pennsylvania |
NCAA Tournament
| Mar 17, 2000* | (15 E) | vs. (2 E) No. 5 Temple; First Round | L 47–73 | 24–7 | HSBC Arena (19,357); Buffalo, New York |
*Non-conference game. ^{#}Rankings from AP Poll. (#) Tournament seedings in parentheses. E=East. All times are in Eastern Time.

== Awards and honors ==
- Brian Ehlers – Patriot League Player of the Year (2x)
