= 1999 Patriot League men's basketball tournament =

- Classification: Division I
- Season: 1998–99
- Teams: 7
- Site: Christl Arena; West Point, New York
- Finals site: Allan P. Kirby Field House; Easton, Pennsylvania
- Champions: Lafayette (1st title)
- Winning coach: Fran O'Hanlon (1st title)
- MVP: Brian Ehlers (Lafayette)

1998–99 Patriot League men's basketball standings
	Conf.				Overall
Team	W		L	PCT	W		L	PCT
Lafayette †	10	–	2	.833	22	–	8	.733
Navy	9	–	3	.750	20	–	7	.741
Bucknell	9	–	3	.750	16	–	13	.552
Colgate	7	–	5	.583	14	–	14	.500
Army	4	–	8	.333	8	–	19	.296
Holy Cross	3	–	9	.250	7	–	20	.259
Lehigh	0	–	12	.000	6	–	22	.214
† 1999 Patriot League tournament winner

The 1999 Patriot League men's basketball tournament was played at Christl Arena in West Point, New York and Cotterell Court in Hamilton, New York after the conclusion of the 1998–99 regular season. Lafayette defeated #3 seed Bucknell, 67–63 in the championship game, to win its first Patriot League Tournament title. The Leopards earned an automatic bid to the 1999 NCAA tournament as #15 seed in the East region.

== Format ==
All seven league members participated in the tournament, with teams seeded according to regular season conference record. Play began with the quarterfinal round.

== Bracket ==
Quarterfinals; February 27
4	Colgate	77
5	Army	56
3	Bucknell	76
6	Holy Cross	52
2	Navy	45
7	Lehigh	53

Semifinals; February 28
1	Lafayette	73
4	Colgate	71
3	Bucknell	58
7	Lehigh	50

Championship game March 5
1	Lafayette	67
3	Bucknell	63
