= Fran O'Hanlon =

American basketball player and coach

Personal information
- Born: August 24, 1948 (age 78) Philadelphia, Pennsylvania, U.S.
- Listed height: 6 ft 1 in (1.85 m)
- Listed weight: 175 lb (79 kg)

Career information
- High school: St. Thomas More (Philadelphia, Pennsylvania)
- College: Villanova (1967–1970)
- NBA draft: 1970: 8th round, 131st overall pick
- Drafted by: Philadelphia 76ers
- Playing career: 1970–1982
- Position: Guard
- Number: 10
- Coaching career: 1982–2022

Career history

Playing
- 1970–1971: Miami Floridians
- 1971–1973: Trenton / Hamilton Pat Pavers
- 1974–1975: Cherry Hill Pros
- 1975–1982: Hageby BK

Coaching
- 1982–1983: Panteras de Lara
- 1983–1984: Hapoel Haifa
- 1984–1985: Temple (women's asst.)
- 1985–1986: Maccabi Haifa
- 1986–1989: Monsignor Bonner HS
- 1989–1995: Penn (assistant)
- 1995–2022: Lafayette

Career highlights
- As Player: Swedish Basketball League champion (1980); As Coach: Venezuelan league champion (1983); 3× Patriot League tournament champion (1999, 2000, 2015); 3× Patriot League regular season champion (1998–2000); Patriot League Central division champion (2021)
- Stats at Basketball Reference

Francis Brian O'Hanlon (born August 24, 1948) is a retired American college basketball coach who was the head men's basketball coach at Lafayette College from 1995 to 2022.

== Formative years ==
Born in Philadelphia, on August 24, 1948, O'Hanlon was a 1970 graduate of Villanova University, where he played college basketball, including during a 1970 NCAA Tournament basketball game against Saint Bonaventure in which Bob Lanier was tripped up and injured in a collision with Chris Ford.

== Professional career ==
O'Hanlon played professional basketball for the Miami Floridians of the ABA in the 1970–71 season despite being a Philadelphia 76ers draft pick in the 8th round of the 1970 NBA draft. He was the only Floridians player whose surname on the back of his jersey didn't need to be embellished with an O' prefix in a publicity stunt for the first game of a Saint Patrick's Day doubleheader versus the Utah Stars at Madison Square Garden in 1971. O'Hanlon played in the Eastern Basketball Association for the Trenton / Hamilton Pat Pavers and Cherry Hill Pros from 1971 to 1975. From 1975 to 1982, O'Hanlon played overseas with Hageby Basket in Sweden.

O'Hanlon was appointed to succeed John Leone as the 21st head coach in Lafayette Leopards men's basketball history on March 13, 1995. He announced on January 21, 2022 his retirement following the conclusion of his 27th season with the Leopards. His final game was an 82–81 overtime home loss to Bucknell at Kirby Sports Center in the Patriot League tournament first round on March 1.

== Head coaching record ==
Record table
Season	Team	Overall	Conference	Standing	Postseason
Lafayette Leopards (Patriot League) (1995–2022)
1995–96	Lafayette	7–20	4–8	5th	
1996–97	Lafayette	11–17	5–7	T–4th	
1997–98	Lafayette	19–9	10–2	T–1st	
1998–99	Lafayette	22–8	10–2	1st	NCAA round of 64
1999–2000	Lafayette	24–7	11–1	T–1st	NCAA round of 64
2000–01	Lafayette	12–16	4–8	T–5th	
2001–02	Lafayette	15–14	8–6	T–3rd	
2002–03	Lafayette	13–16	6–8	6th	
2003–04	Lafayette	18–10	9–5	T–3rd	
2004–05	Lafayette	10–18	6–8	T–5th	
2005–06	Lafayette	11–17	5–9	5th	
2006–07	Lafayette	9–21	3–11	8th	
2007–08	Lafayette	15–15	6–8	T–5th	
2008–09	Lafayette	8–22	4–10	T–7th	
2009–10	Lafayette	19–13	8–6	3rd	
2010–11	Lafayette	13–19	6–8	T-4th	
2011–12	Lafayette	13–17	7–7	5th	
2012–13	Lafayette	19–15	10–4	T–2nd	
2013–14	Lafayette	11–20	6–12	7th	
2014–15	Lafayette	20–13	9–9	T–4th	NCAA round of 64
2015–16	Lafayette	6–24	3–15	10th	
2016–17	Lafayette	9–21	5–13	T–9th	
2017–18	Lafayette	10–21	7–11	7th	
2018–19	Lafayette	10–20	7–11	T–7th	
2019–20	Lafayette	19–12	10–8	T–4th	
2020–21	Lafayette	9–6	9–5	1st (Central)	
2021–22	Lafayette	10–20	7–11	T-7th	
Lafayette:		361–433 (.455)	204–213 (.489)		
Total:		361–433 (.455)			
National champion Postseason invitational champion Conference regular season champion Conference regular season and conference tournament champion Division regular season champion Division regular season and conference tournament champion Conference tournament champion
