= 2017–18 Charleston Cougars women's basketball team =

Intercollegiate basketball season

2017–18 Charleston Cougars women's basketball
- Conference: Colonial Athletic Association
- Record: 7–24 (2–16 CAA)
- Head coach: Candice M. Jackson (4th season)
- Assistant coaches: Malikah Willis; Kelvin Long; Adria Crawford
- Home arena: TD Arena

2017–18 CAA women's basketball standings
	Conf.				Overall
Team	W		L	PCT	W		L	PCT
Drexel	16	–	2	.889	27	–	8	.771
James Madison	16	–	2	.889	23	–	11	.676
Elon †	14	–	4	.778	25	–	8	.758
Delaware	11	–	7	.611	19	–	13	.594
Northeastern	11	–	7	.611	16	–	15	.516
William & Mary	7	–	11	.389	16	–	14	.533
Hofstra	5	–	13	.278	11	–	19	.367
UNC Wilmington	4	–	14	.222	12	–	19	.387
Towson	4	–	14	.222	9	–	21	.300
College of Charleston	2	–	16	.111	7	–	24	.226
† 2018 CAA tournament winner Rankings from AP poll

The 2017–18 Charleston Cougars women's basketball team represented the College of Charleston during the 2017–18 NCAA Division I women's basketball season. The Cougars, led by fourth-year head coach Candice M. Jackson, played their home games at the TD Arena in Charleston, South Carolina as members of the Colonial Athletic Association (CAA). They finished the season 7–24, 2–16 CAA play, to finish in last place. They advanced to the quarterfinals of the CAA women's tournament, where they lost to James Madison.

== Previous season ==
The Cougars finished the 2016–17 season 9–21, 6–12 CAA play, to finish in seventh place. They lost in the first round of the CAA women's tournament to UNC Wilmington.

== Roster ==
2017–18 Charleston Cougars women's basketball team
Players
Coaches

Pos.	#	Name	Height	Year	Previous school	Hometown
G	1	Shai Blanding	5 ft 6 in (1.68 m)	Fr	Holy Innocents' Episcopal	Atlanta, GA
G	2	Darien Huff	5 ft 8 in (1.73 m)	Jr	Elizabethtown	Elizabethtown, KY
G	3	Shiclasia Brown	5 ft 5 in (1.65 m)	Sr	Nazareth Regional	Corona, NY
G	5	Cailin Dorsey	5 ft 11 in (1.8 m)	So	Ravenscroft School	Raleigh, NC
G	10	Dee Heath	5 ft 9 in (1.75 m)	So	Northwood Academy	Hanahan, SC
G	11	Bryanna Goodson	5 ft 9 in (1.75 m)	Fr	Wilson	Florence, SC
G	15	Tanisha Brown	5 ft 11 in (1.8 m)	RS Sr	Myrtle Beach; Charlotte	Loris, SC
F	20	Bri Sullivan	6 ft 1 in (1.85 m)	Jr	Colonial Forge	Fredericksburg, VA
F/C	21	Baileigh Larson	6 ft 2 in (1.88 m)	So	Oakleaf	Orange Park, FL
F/C	23	Brianna Boyd	6 ft 3 in (1.91 m)	RS Sr	Pinewood Prep; Winthrop	Ridgeville, SC
F	24	Lexi Maddox	6 ft 1 in (1.85 m)	Fr	Winder-Barrow	Winder, GA
G	25	Deja Ford	5 ft 9 in (1.75 m)	So	St. Mary's Ryken	Waldorf, MD
F/C	42	Ericka Broughton	6 ft 2 in (1.88 m)	Fr	Goose Creek	Goose Creek, SC

Head coach

- Candice M. Jackson (Michigan State)

Assistant coach(es)

- Malikah Willis (Iowa)
- Kelvin Long (East Tennessee State)
- Adria Crawford (Georgetown)

Legend

- (C) Team captain
- (S) Suspended
- (I) Ineligible
- (W) Walk-on
- Injured
- Current redshirt

Roster
Last update: January 21, 2025

== Schedule ==
Date time, TV	Rank^{#}	Opponent^{#}	Result	Record	Site (attendance) city, state
Exhibition
November 3, 2017*; 6:30 p.m.		USC Aiken	W 80–48		TD Arena; Charleston, SC
Non-conference regular season
November 10, 2017*; 12:00 p.m.		Lipscomb	W 85–69	1–0	TD Arena (304); Charleston, SC
November 12, 2017*; 2:00 p.m.		at Furman	L 58–72	1–1	Timmons Arena (633); Greenville, SC
November 17, 2017*; 12:00 p.m., CSN		at Central Michigan	L 58–79	1–2	McGuirk Arena (3,084); Mount Pleasant, MI
November 19, 2017*; 12:00 p.m.		at Michigan State	L 43–107	1–3	Breslin Center (4,425); East Lansing, MI
November 22, 2017*; 6:30 p.m.		Campbell	L 45–53	1–4	TD Arena (310); Charleston, SC
November 26, 2017*; 2:00 p.m.		Appalachian State	L 70–76	1–5	TD Arena (333); Charleston, SC
November 30, 2017*; 6:00 p.m.		at Coastal Carolina	W 72–70	2–5	HTC Center (335); Conway, SC
December 5, 2017*; 7:00 p.m.		at No. 5 South Carolina	L 43–69	2–6	Colonial Life Arena (11,732); Columbia, SC
December 15, 2017*; 7:00 p.m., ESPN3		at North Florida	W 73–69	3–6	UNF Arena (304); Jacksonville, FL
December 18, 2017*; 6:30 p.m.		Wofford	W 59–51	4–6	TD Arena (339); Charleston, SC
December 21, 2017*; 12:00 p.m.		Wake Forest	L 40–77	4–7	TD Arena (414); Charleston, SC
CAA regular season
December 29, 2017; 6:30 p.m.		William & Mary	L 54–68	4–8 (0–1)	TD Arena (436); Charleston, SC
December 31, 2017; 12:00 p.m.		at Towson	W 80–67	5–8 (1–1)	SECU Arena (171); Towson, MD
January 5, 2018; 6:30 p.m.		Hofstra	L 60–75	5–9 (1–2)	TD Arena (333); Charleston, SC
January 7, 2018; 1:00 p.m.		Delaware	L 59–68	5–10 (1–3)	TD Arena (280); Charleston, SC
January 12, 2018; 7:00 p.m.		at Northeastern	L 37–59	5–11 (1–4)	Cabot Center (348); Boston, MA
January 14, 2018; 2:00 p.m.		at Hofstra	L 60–65	5–12 (1–5)	Hofstra Arena (526); Hempstead, NY
January 19, 2018; 6:30 p.m.		James Madison	L 45–67	5–13 (1–6)	TD Arena (404); Charleston, SC
January 21, 2018; 12:00 p.m.		Towson	L 58–83	5–14 (1–7)	TD Arena (290); Charleston, SC
January 26, 2018; 7:00 p.m.		at William & Mary	L 66–79	5–15 (1–8)	Kaplan Arena (636); Williamsburg, VA
January 28, 2018; 7:00 p.m.		at James Madison	L 67–70	5–16 (1–9)	JMU Convocation Center (3,661); Harrisonburg, VA
February 2, 2018; 6:30 p.m.		Elon	L 55–77	5–17 (1–10)	TD Arena (321); Charleston, SC
February 4, 2018; 1:00 p.m.		Drexel	L 53–80	5–18 (1–11)	TD Arena (330); Charleston, SC
February 9, 2018; 7:00 p.m.		at UNC Wilmington	W 72–63	6–18 (2–11)	Trask Coliseum (857); Wilmington, NC
February 11, 2018; 2:00 p.m.		at Elon	L 44–97	6–19 (2–12)	Alumni Gym (889); Elon, NC
February 18, 2018; 1:00 p.m.		at Delaware	L 51–79	6–20 (2–13)	Bob Carpenter Center (1,503); Newark, DE
February 23, 2018; 11:30 a.m.		UNC Wilmington	L 60–76	6–21 (2–14)	TD Arena (3,209); Charleston, SC
February 25, 2018; 2:00 p.m.		Northeastern	L 59–68	6–22 (2–15)	TD Arena (280); Charleston, SC
March 3, 2018; 1:00 p.m.		at Drexel	L 57–71	6–23 (2–16)	Daskalakis Athletic Center (614); Philadelphia, PA
CAA women's tournament
March 7, 2018; 2:30 p.m.	(10)	vs. (7) Hofstra; First round	W 88–72	7–23	Daskalakis Athletic Center (1,048); Philadelphia, PA
March 8, 2018; 5:00 p.m.	(10)	vs. (2) James Madison; Quarterfinals	L 66–81	7–24	Daskalakis Athletic Center (2,053); Philadelphia, PA
*Non-conference game. ^{#}Rankings from AP poll. (#) Tournament seedings in parentheses. All times are in Eastern.

== See also ==
- 2017–18 Charleston Cougars men's basketball team
