= 2017–18 Drexel Dragons women's basketball team =

American college basketball season

2017–18 Drexel Dragons women's basketball

CAA regular season co-champions

WNIT, Second round
- Conference: Colonial Athletic Association
- Record: 27–8 (16–2 CAA)
- Head coach: Denise Dillon (15th season)
- Assistant coaches: Amy Mallon; Stacy McCullough; Michelle Baker
- MVP: Kelsi Lidge
- Home arena: Daskalakis Athletic Center

2017–18 CAA women's basketball standings
	Conf.				Overall
Team	W		L	PCT	W		L	PCT
Drexel	16	–	2	.889	27	–	8	.771
James Madison	16	–	2	.889	23	–	11	.676
Elon †	14	–	4	.778	25	–	8	.758
Delaware	11	–	7	.611	19	–	13	.594
Northeastern	11	–	7	.611	16	–	15	.516
William & Mary	7	–	11	.389	16	–	14	.533
Hofstra	5	–	13	.278	11	–	19	.367
UNC Wilmington	4	–	14	.222	12	–	19	.387
Towson	4	–	14	.222	9	–	21	.300
College of Charleston	2	–	16	.111	7	–	24	.226
† 2018 CAA tournament winner Rankings from AP poll

The 2017–18 Drexel Dragons women's basketball team represented Drexel University during the 2017–18 NCAA Division I women's basketball season. The Dragons, led by fifteenth year head coach Denise Dillon, played their home games at the Daskalakis Athletic Center and were members of the Colonial Athletic Association (CAA). They finished the season 27–8, 16–2 in CAA play to share the CAA regular season title with James Madison. They advanced to the championship game of the CAA women's tournament where they lost to Elon. They received an automatic trip to the Women's National Invitational Tournament where they defeated Robert Morris in the first round before losing to Fordham in the second round.

== Off season ==
=== Departures ===
Name	Number	Pos.	Height	Year	Hometown	Notes
Meghan Creighton	22	G	5'7"	Senior	West Chester, PA	Graduated
Alexis Smith	23	G	5'6"	Senior	Lusby, MD	Graduated
Sarah Curran	33	F	5'11"	Senior	Media, PA	Graduated

=== 2017 Recruiting Class ===
College recruiting information
Name	Hometown	School	Height	Weight	Commit date
Hannah Nihill; PG	Drexel Hill, PA	Cardinal O'Hara High School	5 ft 5 in (1.65 m)	N/A	Jul 16, 2015
Hannah Nihill; PG	Recruit ratings: ESPN: (88)				
Hayley Wardwell; G	Hanover, MA	Cardinal Spellman High School	5 ft 9 in (1.75 m)	N/A	Aug 12, 2015
Hayley Wardwell; G	Recruit ratings: ESPN: (89)				
Kayla Bacon; G	Owings Mills, MD	Seton Keough High School	5 ft 8 in (1.73 m)	N/A	
Kayla Bacon; G	Recruit ratings: No ratings found				
Overall recruit ranking:
Note: In many cases, Scout, Rivals, 247Sports, On3, and ESPN may conflict in their listings of height and weight.; In these cases, the average was taken. ESPN grades are on a 100-point scale.; Sources: "Drexel Dragons". ESPN.; "2017 Team Ranking". Rivals.

=== Class of 2018 early commitments ===
College recruiting information (2018)
Name	Hometown	School	Height	Weight	Commit date
Maura Hendrixson; SG	Souderton, PA	Cardinal O'Hara HS (PA)	5 ft 9 in (1.75 m)	N/A	Jul 30, 2016
Maura Hendrixson; SG	Recruit ratings: No ratings found				
Kate Connolly; SF	Souderton, PA	Souderton Area HS	N/A	N/A	Nov 15, 2016
Kate Connolly; SF	Recruit ratings: No ratings found				
Keishana Washington; PG	Pickering, Ontario	Durham Elite Prep	5 ft 7 in (1.70 m)	N/A	May 24, 2017
Keishana Washington; PG	Recruit ratings: No ratings found				
Overall recruit ranking:
Note: In many cases, Scout, Rivals, 247Sports, On3, and ESPN may conflict in their listings of height and weight.; In these cases, the average was taken. ESPN grades are on a 100-point scale.; Sources: "Drexel Dragons". ESPN.; "2018 Team Ranking". Rivals.

=== Class of 2019 early commitments ===
College recruiting information (2019)
Name	Hometown	School	Height	Weight	Commit date
Brianne Borcky; PF	Glen Mills, PA	Garnet Valley HS	6 ft 0 in (1.83 m)	N/A	Aug 29, 2017
Brianne Borcky; PF	Recruit ratings: No ratings found				
Overall recruit ranking:
Note: In many cases, Scout, Rivals, 247Sports, On3, and ESPN may conflict in their listings of height and weight.; In these cases, the average was taken. ESPN grades are on a 100-point scale.; Sources: "Drexel Dragons". ESPN.; "2019 Team Ranking". Rivals.

== Roster ==
2017–18 Drexel Dragons women's basketball team
Players
Coaches

Pos.	#	Name	Height	Year	Previous school	Hometown
G	4	Kayla Bacon	5 ft 8 in (1.73 m)	Fr	Seton Keough	Owings Mills, MD
F	10	Eline Maesschalck	5 ft 11 in (1.8 m)	Jr	KA Redingenhof	Aalst, Belgium
G	11	Aubree Brown	5 ft 11 in (1.8 m)	RS So	Archbishop Wood	Philadelphia, PA
F	12	Bailey Greenberg	5 ft 11 in (1.8 m)	So	Archbishop Wood	Philadelphia, PA
G/F	14	Sara Woods	5 ft 10 in (1.78 m)	Sr	Good Counsel	Olney, MD
G	20	Hannah Nihill	5 ft 3 in (1.6 m)	Fr	Cardinal O'Hara	Drexel Hill, PA
G	21	Megan Marecic	5 ft 11 in (1.8 m)	RS Jr	Bethel Park	Bethel Park, PA
G	22	Hayley Wardwell	5 ft 10 in (1.78 m)	Fr	Cardinal Spellman	Hanover, MA
F	24	Niki Metzel	6 ft 2 in (1.88 m)	So	Rutgers Prep	Princeton, NJ
F	25	Kelsi Lidge	5 ft 8 in (1.73 m)	Sr	Regis Jesuit	Aurora, CO
F	30	Mariah Leonard	5 ft 10 in (1.78 m)	RS Fr	Broad Run	Ashburn, VA
C	34	Tereza Kracikova	6 ft 2 in (1.88 m)	Jr	Gymnazium Pripotocni	Prague, Czech Republic
G	50	Ana Ferariu	5 ft 9 in (1.75 m)	So	Johannes Honterus	Brașov, Romania

Head coach

- Denise Dillon (Villanova)

Assistant coach(es)

- Amy Mallon (Saint Joseph's)
- Stacy McCullough (Drexel)
- Michelle Baker (Saint Joseph's)

Legend

- (C) Team captain
- (S) Suspended
- (I) Ineligible
- (W) Walk-on
- Injured
- Current redshirt

Roster
Last update: July 6, 2017

== Schedule ==
Date time, TV	Rank^{#}	Opponent^{#}	Result	Record	High points	High rebounds	High assists	Site (attendance) city, state
Exhibition
October 28, 2017*; 2:00 pm		West Chester	W 69–56		–	–	–	Daskalakis Athletic Center; Philadelphia, PA
November 4, 2017*; 2:00 pm		University of the Sciences	W 70–39		–	–	–	Daskalakis Athletic Center; Philadelphia, PA
Non-conference regular season
November 12, 2017*; 1:00 pm		at Penn State	L 70–84	0–1	16 – Brown	6 – Tied	6 – Brown	Bryce Jordan Center (2,504); University Park, PA
November 16, 2017*; 7:00 pm		La Salle	W 79–54	1–1	14 – Ferariu	6 – Tied	8 – Lidge	Daskalakis Athletic Center (692); Philadelphia, PA
November 18, 2017*; 2:00 pm		Bucknell	W 63–54	2–1	13 – Brown	7 – Greenberg	3 – Brown	Daskalakis Athletic Center (582); Philadelphia, PA
November 23, 2017*; 2:30 pm		vs. Virginia Tech; Paradise Jam First Round	L 67–79	2–2	18 – Brown	7 – Lidge	5 – Lidge	Titan Field House (674); Melbourne, FL
November 24, 2017*; 3:30 pm		vs. No. 11 West Virginia; Paradise Jam Second Round	L 42–75	2–3	16 – Lidge	5 – Brown	2 – Tied	Titan Field House (369); Melbourne, FL
November 25, 2017*; 3:30 pm		vs. Butler; Paradise Jam Third Round	W 76–62	3–3	15 – Tied	5 – Brown	9 – Brown	Titan Field House (276); Melbourne, FL
December 1, 2017*; 7:00 pm		Lafayette	W 52–37	4–3	14 – Marecic	5 – Tied	3 – Tied	Daskalakis Athletic Center (572); Philadelphia, PA
December 3, 2017*; 2:00 pm		at Delaware State	W 73–52	5–3	17 – Lidge	10 – Lidge	9 – Brown	Memorial Hall (243); Dover, DE
December 7, 2017*; 2:00 pm		at Niagara	W 66–65	6–3	23 – Lidge	10 – Greenberg	6 – Brown	Gallagher Center (350); Lewiston, NY
December 9, 2017*; 6:00 pm		at Syracuse	L 62–72	6–4	17 – Marecic	6 – Lidge	4 – Tied	Carrier Dome (1,471); Syracuse, NY
December 17, 2017*; 1:30 pm		at Saint Joseph's	W 65–58	7–4	20 – Marecic	8 – Lidge	2 – Tied	Hagan Arena (3,551); Philadelphia, PA
December 21, 2017*; 1:00 pm		Cornell	W 61–39	8–4	15 – Brown	7 – Lidge	4 – Brown	Daskalakis Athletic Center (524); Philadelphia, PA
CAA regular season
December 29, 2017; 4:00 pm		Delaware	W 74–53	9–4 (1–0)	16 – Lidge	7 – Woods	5 – Tied	Daskalakis Athletic Center (679); Philadelphia, PA
December 31, 2017; 2:00 pm		Hofstra	W 47–38	10–4 (2–0)	14 – Woods	10 – Woods	4 – Woods	Daskalakis Athletic Center (502); Philadelphia, PA
January 5, 2018; 7:00 pm		at William & Mary; Postponed to January 9 (Snow)						Kaplan Arena; Williamsburg, VA
January 7, 2018; 2:00 pm		at James Madison	L 48–56	10–5 (2–1)	19 – Greenberg	9 – Lidge	5 – Brown	JMU Convocation Center (1,849); Harrisonburg, VA
January 9, 2018; 6:00 pm		at William & Mary; Rescheduled from January 5	W 65–58	11–5 (3–1)	17 – Woods	13 – Lidge	8 – Lidge	Kaplan Arena (561); Williamsburg, VA
January 14, 2018; 2:00 pm		UNC Wilmington	W 68–42	12–5 (4–1)	18 – Lidge	8 – Brown	5 – Lidge	Daskalakis Athletic Center (556); Philadelphia, PA
January 19, 2018; 7:00 pm		at Northeastern	W 69–58	13–5 (5–1)	21 – Lidge	9 – Lidge	5 – Tied	Cabot Center (816); Boston, MA
January 21, 2018; 2:00 pm		at Hofstra	W 58–47	14–5 (6–1)	15 – Greenberg	8 – Greenberg	7 – Brown	Hofstra Arena (233); Hempstead, NY
January 26, 2018; 7:00 pm		Elon	W 58–56	15–5 (7–1)	17 – Lidge	9 – Woods	5 – Brown	Daskalakis Athletic Center (638); Philadelphia, PA
January 28, 2018; 2:00 pm		Northeastern	W 58–50	16–5 (8–1)	11 – Tied	6 – Nihill	4 – Brown	Daskalakis Athletic Center (815); Philadelphia, PA
February 2, 2018; 7:00 pm		Towson	W 78–53	17–5 (9–1)	18 – Woods	8 – Nihill	7 – Brown	Daskalakis Athletic Center (508); Philadelphia, PA
February 4, 2018; 1:00 pm		at College of Charleston	W 80–53	18–5 (10–1)	16 – Greenberg	10 – Brown	11 – Brown	TD Arena (330); Charleston, SC
February 9, 2018; 7:00 pm		at Elon	L 58–70	18–6 (10–2)	14 – Brown	6 – Ferariu	2 – Tied	Alumni Gym (787); Elon, NC
February 11, 2018; 1:00 pm		at UNC Wilmington	W 58–40	19–6 (11–2)	11 – Lidge	6 – Marecic	9 – Lidge	Trask Coliseum (808); Wilmington, NC
February 18, 2018; 2:00 pm		William & Mary	W 54–34	20–6 (12–2)	12 – Greenberg	8 – Tied	4 – Lidge	Daskalakis Athletic Center (802); Philadelphia, PA
February 23, 2018; 7:00 pm		James Madison	W 73–71 ^{2OT}	21–6 (13–2)	26 – Brown	7 – Woods	6 – Lidge	Daskalakis Athletic Center (1,208); Philadelphia, PA
February 25, 2018; 2:00 pm		at Towson	W 62–54	22–6 (14–2)	16 – Brown	11 – Greenberg	5 – Brown	SECU Arena (423); Towson, MD
March 1, 2018; 7:00 pm		at Delaware	W 72–53	23–6 (15–2)	27 – Lidge	8 – Woods	4 – Lidge	Bob Carpenter Center (1,408); Newark, DE
March 3, 2018; 1:00 pm		College of Charleston	W 71–57	24–6 (16–2)	20 – Greenberg	10 – Lidge	5 – Tied	Daskalakis Athletic Center (614); Philadelphia, PA
CAA Tournament
March 8, 2018; 12:00 pm	(1)	(8) UNC Wilmington; Quarterfinals	W 71–41	25–6	18 – Lidge	7 – Woods	6 – Brown	Daskalakis Athletic Center; Philadelphia, PA
March 9, 2018; 3:00 pm	(1)	(5) Delaware; Semifinals	W 58–53 ^{OT}	26–6	13 – Greenberg	11 – Woods	4 – Brown	Daskalakis Athletic Center; Philadelphia, PA
March 10, 2018; 1:00 pm, NBCSN	(1)	(3) Elon; Championship	L 45–57	26–7	14 – Nihill	4 – Brown	3 – Greenberg	Daskalakis Athletic Center (2,441); Philadelphia, PA
WNIT
March 16, 2018; 7:00 pm		Robert Morris; First round	W 57–44	27–7	14 – Greenberg	6 – Lidge	5 – Lidge	Daskalakis Athletic Center (479); Philadelphia, PA
March 18, 2018; 4:00 pm		Fordham; Second round	L 60–63	27–8	20 – Greenberg	6 – Greenberg	7 – Brown	Daskalakis Athletic Center (505); Philadelphia, PA
*Non-conference game. ^{#}Rankings from AP. (#) Tournament seedings in parentheses. All times are in Eastern Time.

== See also ==
2017–18 Drexel Dragons men's basketball team
