= 2000 Patriot League men's basketball tournament =

- Classification: Division I
- Season: 1999–00
- Teams: 7
- Site: Allan P. Kirby Field House; Easton, Pennsylvania
- Champions: Lafayette (2nd title)
- Winning coach: Fran O'Hanlon (2nd title)
- MVP: Stefan Ciosici (Lafayette)

1999–2000 Patriot League men's basketball standings
	Conf.				Overall
Team	W		L	PCT	W		L	PCT
Navy	11	–	1	.917	23	–	6	.793
Lafayette †	11	–	1	.917	24	–	7	.774
Bucknell	8	–	4	.667	17	–	11	.607
Colgate	4	–	8	.333	13	–	16	.448
Holy Cross	3	–	9	.250	10	–	18	.357
Lehigh	3	–	9	.250	8	–	21	.276
Army	2	–	10	.167	5	–	23	.179
† 2000 Patriot League tournament winner

The 2000 Patriot League men's basketball tournament was played at Allan P. Kirby Field House in Easton, Pennsylvania after the conclusion of the 1999–2000 regular season. Lafayette defeated top seed Navy, 87–61 in the championship game, to win its second Patriot League Tournament title. The Leopards earned an automatic bid to the 2000 NCAA tournament as #15 seed in the East region.

== Format ==
All seven league members participated in the tournament, with teams seeded according to regular season conference record. Play began with the quarterfinal round.

== Bracket ==
Quarterfinals; March 4
4	Colgate	58
5	Holy Cross	49
3	Bucknell	62
6	Lehigh	73
2	Lafayette	71
7	Army	45

Semifinals; March 5
1	Navy	82
4	Colgate	56
3	Lehigh	60
2	Lafayette	66

Championship game March 10
1	Navy	61
2	Lafayette	87
