= 2017–18 Delaware Fightin' Blue Hens women's basketball team =

Intercollegiate basketball season

2017–18 Delaware Fightin' Blue Hens women's basketball

WNIT, First Round
- Conference: Colonial Athletic Association
- Record: 19–13 (11–7 CAA)
- Head coach: Natasha Adair (1st season)
- Assistant coaches: Bob Clark; Sarah Jenkins; Mykala Walker
- Home arena: Bob Carpenter Center

2017–18 CAA women's basketball standings
	Conf.				Overall
Team	W		L	PCT	W		L	PCT
Drexel	16	–	2	.889	27	–	8	.771
James Madison	16	–	2	.889	23	–	11	.676
Elon †	14	–	4	.778	25	–	8	.758
Delaware	11	–	7	.611	19	–	13	.594
Northeastern	11	–	7	.611	16	–	15	.516
William & Mary	7	–	11	.389	16	–	14	.533
Hofstra	5	–	13	.278	11	–	19	.367
UNC Wilmington	4	–	14	.222	12	–	19	.387
Towson	4	–	14	.222	9	–	21	.300
College of Charleston	2	–	16	.111	7	–	24	.226
† 2018 CAA tournament winner Rankings from AP poll

The 2017–18 Delaware Fightin' Blue Hens women's basketball team represented the University of Delaware during the 2017–18 NCAA Division I women's basketball season. The Fightin' Blue Hens, led by first-year head coach Natasha Adair, played their home games at the Bob Carpenter Center and were members of the Colonial Athletic Association (CAA). They finished the season 19–13, 11–7 in CAA play to finish in fourth place. They advanced to the semifinals of the CAA women's tournament, where they lost to Drexel. They received an at-large bid to the Women's National Invitation Tournament, where they lost in the first round to Georgetown.

== Roster ==
2017–18 Delaware Fightin' Blue Hens women's basketball team
Players
Coaches

Pos.	#	Name	Height	Year	Previous school	Hometown
G/F	0	Gadson Lefft	6 ft 1 in (1.85 m)	RS Jr	Heathwood Hall/Phillips Academy; Clemson	Lake Wylie, SC
G	2	Abby Gonzales	5 ft 7 in (1.7 m)	So	North Allegheny	Wexford, PA
F	5	Makeda Nicholas	6 ft 1 in (1.85 m)	Sr	North Babylon	North Babylon, NY
F	12	Lizzie Oleary	6 ft 2 in (1.88 m)	Fr	Abington Senior	Willow Grove, PA
G	15	Danielle Roberts	5 ft 6 in (1.68 m)	RS Sr	South Brunswick; Georgia Southern	Dayton, NJ
G	21	Kiersten West	5 ft 9 in (1.75 m)	Sr	Longwood	Coram, NY
F	22	Samone DeFreese	5 ft 11 in (1.8 m)	So	Berkshire	Bergenfield, NJ
G	23	Bailey Kargo	5 ft 10 in (1.78 m)	So	Walter Hines Page	Greensboro, NC
G	24	Justina Mascaro	5 ft 11 in (1.8 m)	Fr	Bethel Park	Bethel Park, PA
F	25	Rebecca Lawrence	6 ft 3 in (1.91 m)	So	Walter Hines Page	Ridgefield, CT
F	33	Nicole Enabosi	6 ft 0 in (1.83 m)	Jr	Our Lady of Good Counsel	Gaithersburg, MD
G	35	Alison Lewis	5 ft 9 in (1.75 m)	RS Jr	Sanford School; Providence	Kennett Square, PA
F	40	Alexis Sears	6 ft 2 in (1.88 m)	Sr	Lenape HS	Mount Laurel, NJ
F/C	44	Erin Antosh	6 ft 3 in (1.91 m)	Fr	Lawrence Academy	Townsend, MA

Head coach

- Natasha Adair (South Florida)

Assistant coach(es)

- Bob Clark (Towson)
- Sarah Jenkins (Georgetown)
- Mykala Walker (Wake Forest)

Legend

- (C) Team captain
- (S) Suspended
- (I) Ineligible
- (W) Walk-on
- Injured
- Current redshirt

Roster
Last update: December 22, 2017

== Schedule ==
Date time, TV	Rank^{#}	Opponent^{#}	Result	Record	Site (attendance) city, state
Non-conference regular season
11/10/2017*; 1:00 pm		at Buffalo	L 73–87	0–1	Alumni Arena (1,015); Buffalo, NY
11/13/2017*; 7:00 pm		at Hartford	W 72–63	1–1	Chase Arena at Reich Family Pavilion (714); West Hartford, CT
11/16/2017*; 7:00 pm, NBCSPHI+		American	W 72–56	2–1	Bob Carpenter Center (1,466); Newark, DE
11/19/2017*; 2:00 pm		Boston University	L 79–85 ^{OT}	2–2	Bob Carpenter Center (1,330); Newark, DE
11/25/2017*; 4:00 pm		vs. Saint Peter's; Hawk Classic semifinals	L 87–90 ^{OT}	2–3	Hagan Arena (1,025); Philadelphia, PA
11/26/2017*; 2:00 pm		vs. Eastern Illinois; Hawk Classic 3rd place game	W 66–37	3–3	Hagan Arena (732); Philadelphia, PA
11/29/2017*; 7:00 pm		at St. Bonaventure	W 53–52	4–3	Reilly Center (953); Olean, NY
12/02/2017*; 7:00 pm, NBCSPHI+		at Princeton	L 60–78	4–4	Jadwin Gymnasium (699); Princeton, NJ
12/06/2017*; 7:00 pm		at Army	W 70–59	5–4	Christl Arena (432); West Point, NY
12/10/2017*; 2:00 pm		Delaware State	W 84–49	6–4	Bob Carpenter Center (1,311); Newark, DE
12/22/2017*; 1:00 pm		Loyola (MD)	W 71–38	7–4	Bob Carpenter Center (1,414); Newark, DE
CAA regular season
12/29/2017; 4:00 pm		at Drexel	L 53–74	7–5 (0–1)	Daskalakis Athletic Center (679); Philadelphia, PA
01/05/2018; 12:00 pm		Elon	W 80–66	8–5 (1–1)	Bob Carpenter Center (1,180); Newark, DE
01/07/2018; 1:00 pm		at College of Charleston	W 68–59	9–5 (2–1)	TD Arena (280); Charleston, SC
01/12/2018; 7:00 pm		at Hofstra	W 58–51	10–5 (3–1)	Hofstra Arena (318); Hempstead, NY
01/14/2018; 2:00 pm		Towson	W 51–49	11–5 (4–1)	Bob Carpenter Center (1,554); Newark, DE
01/19/2018; 7:00 pm		at UNC Wilmington	W 82–49	12–5 (5–1)	Trask Coliseum (819); Wilmington, DE
01/21/2018; 1:00 pm		at Elon	L 51–64	12–6 (5–2)	Alumni Gym (872); Elon, NC
01/26/2018; 7:00 pm		Northeastern	L 53–64	12–7 (5–3)	Bob Carpenter Center (1,539); Newark, DE
01/28/2018; 1:00 pm		UNC Wilmington	W 80–62	13–7 (6–3)	Bob Carpenter Center (1,554); Newark, DE
02/04/2018; 2:00 pm		at Northeastern	L 59–73	13–8 (6–4)	Cabot Center (392); Boston, MA
02/09/2018; 7:00 pm		William & Mary	W 68–59	14–8 (7–4)	Bob Carpenter Center (1,359); Newark, DE
02/11/2018; 2:00 pm		Hofstra	W 61–41	15–8 (8–4)	Bob Carpenter Center (1,753); Newark, DE
02/16/2018; 7:00 pm		James Madison	L 53–56	15–9 (8–5)	Bob Carpenter Center (1,422); Newark, DE
02/18/2018; 1:00 pm		College of Charleston	W 79–51	16–9 (8–6)	Bob Carpenter Center (1,503); Newark, DE
02/23/2018; 7:00 pm		at William & Mary	W 61–52	17–9 (9–6)	Kaplan Arena (731); Williamsburg, VA
02/25/2018; 2:00 pm		at James Madison	L 56–67	17–10 (9–7)	JMU Convocation Center (3,494); Harrisonburg, VA
03/01/2018; 7:00 pm		Drexel	L 58–72	17–11 (10–7)	Bob Carpenter Center (1,408); Newark, DE
03/03/2018; 2:00 pm		at Towson	W 81–55	18–11 (11–7)	SECU Arena (481); Towson, MD
CAA Women's Tournament
03/08/2018; 2:30 pm	(5)	vs. (4) Northeastern; Quarterfinals	W 61–50	19–11	Daskalakis Athletic Center (2,053); Philadelphia, PA
03/09/2018; 3:00 pm	(5)	at (1) Drexel; Semifinals	L 53–58 ^{OT}	19–12	Daskalakis Athletic Center (2,120); Philadelphia, PA
WNIT
03/16/2018*; 7:00 pm		at Georgetown; First Round	L 57–67	19–13	McDonough Gymnasium (653); Washington, D.C.
*Non-conference game. ^{#}Rankings from AP Poll. (#) Tournament seedings in parentheses. All times are in Eastern Time.

== See also ==
- 2017–18 Delaware Fightin' Blue Hens men's basketball team
