= 2017–18 Hofstra Pride women's basketball team =

Intercollegiate basketball season

2017–18 Hofstra Pride women's basketball
- Conference: Colonial Athletic Association
- Record: 11–19 (5–13 CAA)
- Head coach: Krista Kilburn-Steveskey (12th season)
- Assistant coaches: Faisal Khan; Denise King; Michael Gibson
- Home arena: Hofstra Arena

2017–18 CAA women's basketball standings
	Conf.				Overall
Team	W		L	PCT	W		L	PCT
Drexel	16	–	2	.889	27	–	8	.771
James Madison	16	–	2	.889	23	–	11	.676
Elon †	14	–	4	.778	25	–	8	.758
Delaware	11	–	7	.611	19	–	13	.594
Northeastern	11	–	7	.611	16	–	15	.516
William & Mary	7	–	11	.389	16	–	14	.533
Hofstra	5	–	13	.278	11	–	19	.367
UNC Wilmington	4	–	14	.222	12	–	19	.387
Towson	4	–	14	.222	9	–	21	.300
College of Charleston	2	–	16	.111	7	–	24	.226
† 2018 CAA tournament winner Rankings from AP poll

The 2017–18 Hofstra Pride women's basketball team represented Hofstra University during the 2017–18 NCAA Division I women's basketball season. The Pride, led by twelfth-year head coach Krista Kilburn-Steveskey, played their home games at Hofstra Arena and were members of the Colonial Athletic Association (CAA). They finished the season 11–19, 5–13 in CAA play, to finish in seventh place. They lost in the first round of the CAA women's tournament to College of Charleston.

== Previous season ==
They finished the season 13–18, 5–13 in CAA play, to finish in a three-way tie for eighth place. They advanced to the quarterfinals of the CAA women's tournament where they lost to James Madison.

== Roster ==
2017–18 Hofstra Pride women's basketball team
Players
Coaches

Pos.	#	Name	Height	Year	Previous school	Hometown
G	1	E'Lexus Davis	5 ft 7 in (1.7 m)	So	National Christian Academy	Hyattsville, MD
G	2	Ashunae Durant	5 ft 10 in (1.78 m)	Sr	Bloomfield Tech	Newark, NJ
G	5	Petja Krupenko	5 ft 8 in (1.73 m)	So	Gimnazija Bezigrad	Ljubljana, Slovenia
G	10	Ana Hernandez Gil	5 ft 8 in (1.73 m)	So	San Antonio Maria Claret	Las Palmas de Gran Canaria, Canary Islands
F	11	Jaylen Hines	5 ft 10 in (1.78 m)	Fr	Elizabeth Seton	Clinton, MD
F	12	Mie Hoff	6 ft 0 in (1.83 m)	Fr	Stend Videreående Skole	Bergen, Norway
G	13	Aleana Leon	5 ft 7 in (1.7 m)	Sr	Colegio del Sagrado Corazon de Jesus	Ponce, PR
F	21	Mikiyah Croskey	6 ft 1 in (1.85 m)	So	National Christian Academy	Bowie, MD
G	22	Olivia Askin	5 ft 8 in (1.73 m)	Sr	Shawnee	Medford, NJ
G	24	Sica Cuzic	5 ft 10 in (1.78 m)	Jr	Trinity International; Salt Lake CC	Galați, Romania
F	33	Kayla Minott	6 ft 3 in (1.91 m)	Jr	St. Peter Catholic High School	Ottawa, ON
G	34	Boogie Brozoski	5 ft 6 in (1.68 m)	Jr	Long Island Lutheran; Michigan	Cambria Heights, NY
F	53	Marianne Kalin	6 ft 1 in (1.85 m)	So	Kimpisen Lukio	Lappeenranta, Finland
G	54	Sandra Karsten	5 ft 9 in (1.75 m)	So	Mäkelänrinteen Lukio	Helsinki, Finland

Head coach

- Krista Kilburn-Steveskey (NC State)

Assistant coach(es)

- Faisal Khan (UMBC)
- Denise King (Rhode Island)
- Michael Gibson (Boston College)

Legend

- (C) Team captain
- (S) Suspended
- (I) Ineligible
- (W) Walk-on
- Injured
- Current redshirt

Roster

== Schedule ==
Date time, TV	Rank^{#}	Opponent^{#}	Result	Record	Site (attendance) city, state
Exhibition
11/03/2017*; 4:00 pm		at Fordham; Puerto Rico Relief Exhibition	W 55–46		Rose Hill Gymnasium; The Bronx, NY
Non-conference regular season
11/12/2017*; 2:00 pm		UMBC	W 71–55	1–0	Hofstra Arena (323); Hempstead, NY
11/14/2017*; 6:00 pm		Stony Brook	L 49–73	1–1	Hofstra Arena (312); Hempstead, NY
11/18/2017*; 2:00 pm, ESPN3		at Hartford	L 49–60	1–2	Chase Arena at Reich Family Pavilion (907); West Hartford, CT
11/21/2017*; 7:00 pm		Holy Cross	W 69–63	2–2	Hofstra Arena (277); Hempstead, NY
11/25/2017*; 3:00 pm		at UNLV; Lady Rebel Round-Up semifinals	L 52–68	2–3	Cox Pavilion; Paradise, NV
11/26/2017*; 3:00 pm		vs. Wake Forest; Lady Rebel Round-Up third-place game	W 69–66	3–3	Cox Pavilion; Paradise, NV
11/30/2017*; 6:00 pm		at Sacred Heart	W 86–81 ^{2OT}	4–3	William H. Pitt Center (326); Fairfield, CT
12/04/2017*; 7:00 pm		Siena	L 60–70	4–4	Hofstra Arena (316); Hempstead, NY
12/07/2017*; 7:00 pm, ESPN3		at Iona	W 68–43	5–4	Hynes Athletic Center (419); New Rochelle, NY
12/11/2017*; 7:00 pm, SNY		at Columbia	L 53–75	5–5	Levien Gymnasium (325); New York, NY
12/21/2017*; 2:00 pm		St. Bonaventure	W 71–68	6–5	Hofstra Arena (265); Hempstead, NY
CAA regular season
12/29/2017; 7:00 pm		James Madison	L 42–55	6–6 (0–1)	Hofstra Arena (448); Hempstead, NY
12/31/2017; 2:00 pm		at Drexel	L 38–47	6–7 (0–2)	Daskalakis Athletic Center (502); Philadelphia, PA
01/05/2018; 6:30 pm		at College of Charleston	W 75–60	7–7 (1–2)	TD Arena (333); Charleston, SC
01/07/2018; 1:00 pm		at UNC Wilmington	W 69–61	8–7 (2–2)	Trask Coliseum (593); Wilmington, NC
01/12/2018; 7:00 pm		Delaware	L 51–59	8–8 (2–3)	Hofstra Arena (318); Hempstead, NY
01/14/2018; 2:00 pm		College of Charleston	W 65–60	9–8 (3–3)	Hofstra Arena (526); Hempstead, NY
01/19/2018; 11:30 am		William & Mary	W 65–54	10–8 (4–3)	Hofstra Arena (2,262); Hempstead, NY
01/21/2018; 2:00 pm		Drexel	L 47–58	10–9 (4–4)	Hofstra Arena (233); Hempstead, NY
01/26/2018; 7:00 pm		at James Madison	L 56–73	10–10 (4–5)	JMU Convocation Center (2,000); Harrisonburg, VA
01/28/2018; 2:00 pm		at William & Mary	L 53–63	10–11 (4–6)	Kaplan Arena (692); Williamsburg, PA
02/04/2018; 1:00 pm		UNC Wilmington	L 55–59	10–12 (4–7)	Hofstra Arena (454); Hempstead, NY
02/09/2018; 7:00 pm		at Towson	L 72–73	10–13 (4–8)	SECU Arena (286); Towson, MD
02/11/2018; 2:00 pm		at Delaware	L 41–61	10–14 (4–9)	Bob Carpenter Center (1,753); Newark, DE
02/16/2018; 7:00 pm		Elon	L 65–72	10–15 (5–10)	Hofstra Arena (355); Hempstead, NY
02/18/2018; 2:00 pm		Towson	W 83–72	11–15 (5–10)	Hofstra Arena (1,020); Hempstead, NY
02/23/2018; 7:00 pm		Northeastern	L 50–55	11–16 (5–11)	Hofstra Arena (448); Hempstead, NY
02/25/2018; 2:00 pm		at Elon	L 55–80	11–17 (5–12)	Alumni Gym (1,027); Elon, NC
03/02/2018; 2:00 pm		at Northeastern	L 54–58	11–18 (5–13)	Cabot Center (278); Boston, MA
CAA women's tournament
03/07/2018; 2:30 pm	(7)	vs. (10) College of Charleston; First Round	L 72–88	11–19	Daskalakis Athletic Center (1,048); Philadelphia, PA
*Non-conference game. ^{#}Rankings from AP poll. (#) Tournament seedings in parentheses. All times are in Eastern Time.

== See also ==
- 2017–18 Hofstra Pride men's basketball team
