= 2017–18 Elon Phoenix women's basketball team =

Intercollegiate basketball season

2017–18 Elon Phoenix women's basketball

CAA tournament champions

NCAA tournament, First Round
- Conference: Colonial Athletic Association
- Record: 25–8 (14–4 CAA)
- Head coach: Charlotte Smith (7th season)
- Assistant coaches: Cristy McKinney; Josh Wick; Tasha Taylor
- Home arena: Alumni Gym

2017–18 CAA women's basketball standings
	Conf.				Overall
Team	W		L	PCT	W		L	PCT
Drexel	16	–	2	.889	27	–	8	.771
James Madison	16	–	2	.889	23	–	11	.676
Elon †	14	–	4	.778	25	–	8	.758
Delaware	11	–	7	.611	19	–	13	.594
Northeastern	11	–	7	.611	16	–	15	.516
William & Mary	7	–	11	.389	16	–	14	.533
Hofstra	5	–	13	.278	11	–	19	.367
UNC Wilmington	4	–	14	.222	12	–	19	.387
Towson	4	–	14	.222	9	–	21	.300
College of Charleston	2	–	16	.111	7	–	24	.226
† 2018 CAA tournament winner Rankings from AP poll

The 2017–18 Elon Phoenix women's basketball team represented Elon University during the 2017–18 NCAA Division I women's basketball season. The Phoenix, led by seventh-year head coach Charlotte Smith, played their home games at Alumni Gym and were members of the Colonial Athletic Association (CAA). They finished the season 25–8, 14–4 in CAA play to finish in third place. They also won the CAA Tournament Championship for the second straight year and earned an automatic bid to the NCAA women's basketball tournament. They lost in the first round to NC State.

This season was the last for the Phoenix at Alumni Gym, with the new Schar Center scheduled to open for the 2018 women's volleyball season (which precedes the basketball season within the school year).

== Roster ==
2017–18 Elon Phoenix women's basketball team
Players
Coaches

Pos.	#	Name	Height	Year	Previous school	Hometown
G	1	Saadia Munford	5 ft 6 in (1.68 m)	Fr	Jonesboro	Atlanta, GA
F	3	Anna Popovic	6 ft 1 in (1.85 m)	Fr	Charnwood	Loughborough, England
G	5	Shay Burnett	5 ft 9 in (1.75 m)	Sr	Southern Alamance	Graham, NC
G	10	Jada Graves	5 ft 9 in (1.75 m)	So	Thomas Edison	Alexandria, VA
F	13	Jaylin Powell	5 ft 10 in (1.78 m)	Fr	Rolesville	Raleigh, NC
G	21	Ariel Colon	5 ft 10 in (1.78 m)	Fr	Ocoee	Orlando, FL
G	22	Lexi Mercer	5 ft 9 in (1.75 m)	So	Rosewood	Goldsboro, NC
G	23	Ariana Nance	5 ft 9 in (1.75 m)	Fr	Rocky River	Charlotte, NC
F	32	Meme Garner	6 ft 0 in (1.83 m)	RS Sr	Jordan-Matthews; Charlotte	Siler City, NC
C	34	Ra'Shika White	6 ft 5 in (1.96 m)	So	Phillip O'Berry Academy	Charlotte, NC
F	42	Emily Maupin	6 ft 3 in (1.91 m)	Fr	The Covenant School	Charlottesville, VA
C	44	Malaya Johnson	6 ft 3 in (1.91 m)	Sr	North Surry	Mount Airy, NC

Head coach

- Charlotte Smith (North Carolina)

Assistant coach(es)

- Cristy McKinney (Western Carolina)
- Josh Wick (North Carolina)
- Tasha Taylor (Clemson)

Legend

- (C) Team captain
- (S) Suspended
- (I) Ineligible
- (W) Walk-on
- Injured
- Current redshirt

Roster
Last update: December 22, 2017

== Schedule ==
Date time, TV	Rank^{#}	Opponent^{#}	Result	Record	Site (attendance) city, state
Exhibition
11/05/2017*; 5:30 pm		Anderson	W 102–47		Alumni Gym; Elon, NC
Non-conference regular season
11/10/2017*; 7:00 pm		Winthrop	W 98–37	1–0	Alumni Gym (794); Elon, NC
11/13/2017*; 5:30 pm		at North Carolina A&T	W 90–59	2–0	Corbett Sports Center (421); Greensboro, NC
11/17/2017*; 7:00 pm		Hampton	W 82–59	3–0	Alumni Gym (871); Elon, NC
11/22/2017*; 2:00 pm		at UCF	W 71–57	4–0	CFE Arena (2,332); Orlando, FL
11/24/2017*; 5:00 pm		vs. Alabama; Puerto Rico Clasico	W 60–55	5–0	Cardinal Gibbons Arena (87); Fort Lauderdale, FL
11/25/2017*; 5:00 pm		vs. Iowa; Puerto Rico Clasico	L 61–74	5–1	Cardinal Gibbons Arena (137); Fort Lauderdale, FL
11/27/2017*; 7:00 pm		Coker	W 106–54	6–1	Alumni Gym (786); Elon, NC
12/02/2017*; 12:00 pm		at Wake Forest	L 51–53	6–2	LJVM Coliseum (411); Winston-Salem, NC
12/06/2017*; 7:00 pm		at Davidson	W 75–58	7–2	John M. Belk Arena (365); Davidson, NC
12/16/2017*; 6:00 pm, ACCN Extra		at NC State	L 57–70	7–3	Reynolds Coliseum (2,002); Raleigh, NC
12/19/2017*; 7:00 pm		North Carolina Central	W 78–50	8–3	Alumni Gym (709); Elon, NC
CAA regular season
12/29/2017; 7:00 pm		UNC Wilmington	W 75–67	9–3 (1–0)	Alumni Gym (951); Elon, NC
01/05/2018; 12:00 pm		at Delaware	L 66–80	9–4 (1–1)	Bob Carpenter Center (1,180); Newark, DE
01/07/2018; 2:00 pm		Northeastern	W 78–71	10–4 (2–1)	Alumni Gym (789); Elon, NC
01/12/2018; 7:00 pm		at James Madison	L 67–70	10–5 (2–2)	JMU Convocation Center (1,849); Harrisonburg, VA
01/14/2018; 2:00 pm		at William & Mary	L 75–81	10–6 (2–3)	Kaplan Arena (543); Williamsburg, VA
01/19/2018; 7:00 pm		Towson	W 84–61	11–6 (3–3)	Alumni Gym (749); Elon, NC
01/21/2018; 1:00 pm		Delaware	W 64–51	12–6 (4–3)	Alumni Gym (872); Elon, NC
01/26/2018; 7:00 pm		at Drexel	L 56–58	12–7 (4–4)	Daskalakis Athletic Center (638); Philadelphia, PA
01/28/2018; 2:00 pm		at Towson	W 71–45	13–7 (5–4)	SECU Arena (564); Towson, MD
02/02/2018; 6:30 pm		at College of Charleston	W 77–55	14–7 (6–4)	TD Arena (321); Charleston, SC
02/04/2018; 2:00 pm		James Madison	W 50–43	15–7 (7–4)	Alumni Gym (848); Elon, NC
02/09/2018; 7:00 pm		Drexel	W 70–58	16–7 (8–4)	Alumni Gym (787); Elon, NC
02/11/2018; 2:00 pm		College of Charleston	W 97–44	17–7 (9–4)	Alumni Gym (889); Elon, NC
02/16/2018; 7:00 pm		at Hofstra	W 72–65	18–7 (10–4)	Hofstra Arena (355); Hempstead, NY
02/18/2018; 2:00 pm		at Northeastern	W 65–46	19–7 (11–4)	Cabot Center (311); Boston, MA
02/25/2018; 2:00 pm		Hofstra	W 80–55	20–7 (12–4)	Alumni Gym (1,027); Elon, NC
03/01/2018; 7:00 pm		William & Mary	W 82–61	21–7 (13–4)	Alumni Gym (1,329); Elon, NC
03/03/2017; 2:00 pm		at UNC Wilmington	W 58–49	22–7 (14–4)	Trask Coliseum (743); Wilmington, NC
CAA Women's Tournament
03/08/2018; 7:30 pm	(3)	vs. (6) William & Mary; Quarterfinals	W 67–50	23–7	Daskalakis Athletic Center (2,053); Philadelphia, PA
03/09/2018; 3:00 pm	(3)	vs. (2) James Madison; Semifinals	W 76–53	24–7	Daskalakis Athletic Center (2,120); Philadelphia, PA
03/10/2018; 1:00 pm, NBCSN	(3)	at (1) Drexel; Championship Game	W 57–45	25–7	Daskalakis Athletic Center (2,441); Philadelphia, PA
NCAA Women's Tournament
03/16/2018*; 2:30 pm, ESPN2	(13 KC)	at (4 KC) No. 21 NC State; First Round	L 35–62	25–8	Reynolds Coliseum (2,669); Raleigh, NC
*Non-conference game. ^{#}Rankings from AP Poll. (#) Tournament seedings in parentheses. KC=Kansas City Region. All times are in Eastern Time.

== Rankings ==
Regular season polls
Poll	Pre- season	Week 2	Week 3	Week 4	Week 5	Week 6	Week 7	Week 8	Week 9	Week 10	Week 11	Week 12	Week 13	Week 14	Week 15	Week 16	Week 17	Week 18	Week 19	Final
AP																				N/A
Coaches	RV	N/A	RV																	

Legend
	Increase in ranking
	Decrease in ranking
	Not ranked previous week
(RV)	Received votes
(NR)	Not ranked

== See also ==
- 2017–18 Elon Phoenix men's basketball team
