= 2017–18 Towson Tigers women's basketball team =

Intercollegiate basketball season

2017–18 Towson Tigers women's basketball
- Conference: Colonial Athletic Association
- Record: 9–21 (4–14 CAA)
- Head coach: Diane Richardson (1st season)
- Assistant coaches: Zach Kancher; Wanisha Smith; Billie Wilson
- Home arena: SECU Arena

2017–18 CAA women's basketball standings
	Conf.				Overall
Team	W		L	PCT	W		L	PCT
Drexel	16	–	2	.889	27	–	8	.771
James Madison	16	–	2	.889	23	–	11	.676
Elon †	14	–	4	.778	25	–	8	.758
Delaware	11	–	7	.611	19	–	13	.594
Northeastern	11	–	7	.611	16	–	15	.516
William & Mary	7	–	11	.389	16	–	14	.533
Hofstra	5	–	13	.278	11	–	19	.367
UNC Wilmington	4	–	14	.222	12	–	19	.387
Towson	4	–	14	.222	9	–	21	.300
College of Charleston	2	–	16	.111	7	–	24	.226
† 2018 CAA tournament winner Rankings from AP poll

The 2017–18 Towson Tigers women's basketball team represented Towson University during the 2017–18 NCAA Division I women's basketball season. The Tigers, led by first-year head coach Diane Richardson, played their home games at SECU Arena in Towson, Maryland as members of the Colonial Athletic Association (CAA). They finished the season 9–21, 4–14 in CAA play, to finish in a tie for eighth place. They lost in the first round of the CAA women's tournament to UNC Wilmington.

== Previous season ==
The Tigers finished the 2016–17 season 12–18, 5–13 in CAA play, to finish in a three-way tie for eighth place. They lost in the first round of the CAA women's tournament to Hofstra.

== Roster ==
2017–18 Towson Tigers women's basketball team
Players
Coaches

Pos.	#	Name	Height	Year	Previous school	Hometown
G	0	Danielle Durjan	5 ft 10 in (1.78 m)	Jr	Watkins Mills; Hartford CC/Sacred Heart	Montgomery County, MD
G/F	1	Nukiya Mayo	6 ft 3 in (1.91 m)	So	Monsignor Scanlan	The Bronx, NY
G	2	Rayna Barbour	5 ft 3 in (1.6 m)	Fr	Paul VI Catholic	Fort Washington, MD
G	4	Jalynn Holmes	5 ft 9 in (1.75 m)	Fr	Riverdale Baptist	Upper Marlboro, MD
G	5	Kayla Davis	5 ft 7 in (1.7 m)	Sr	St. Marguerite d'Youville; Xavier	Brampton, ON
G	10	Raine Bankston	5 ft 10 in (1.78 m)	RS Sr	John Glenn H.S. Delaware State	Detroit, MI
G	13	Etalyia Vogt	5 ft 6 in (1.68 m)	So	St. Anthony's H.S.	Long Island, NY
G	15	Mariah Gray	5 ft 7 in (1.7 m)	So	Good Counsel H.S.	Ellicott City, MD
F	22	Mary Cuevas	6 ft 4 in (1.93 m)	Sr	CD CREF; ASA College	Madrid, Spain
F	23	Brittany Tarr	6 ft 0 in (1.83 m)	Jr	Sevier County	Sevierville, TN
F	24	Tess Borgosz	6 ft 2 in (1.88 m)	Fr	Depew	Depew, NY
C	25	Maia Lee	6 ft 4 in (1.93 m)	RS Jr	McLean; Old Dominion	McLean, VA
C	33	Daijha Thomas	6 ft 4 in (1.93 m)	Sr	Calvert	St. Leonard, MD

Head coach

- Diane Richardson (Frostburg State)

Assistant coach(es)

- Zach Kancher (George Washington)
- Wanisha Smith (Duke)
- Billie Wilson (Frostburg State)

Legend

- (C) Team captain
- (S) Suspended
- (I) Ineligible
- (W) Walk-on
- Injured
- Current redshirt

Roster
Last update: December 2, 2024

== Schedule ==
Date time, TV	Rank^{#}	Opponent^{#}	Result	Record	Site (attendance) city, state
Non-conference regular season
November 12, 2017*; 2:00 p.m.		at UMass	L 49–72	0–1	Mullins Center (361); Amherst, MA
November 16, 2017*; 7:00 p.m.		George Washington	L 43–66	0–2	SECU Arena (1,213); Towson, MD
November 19, 2017*; 2:00 p.m.		at Pittsburgh	L 63–81	0–3	Petersen Events Center (1,124); Pittsburgh, PA
November 21, 2017*; 11:00 a.m.		UMBC	W 95–64	1–3	SECU Arena (3,100); Towson, MD
November 26, 2017*; 2:00 p.m.		Colgate	L 61–65	1–4	SECU Arena (151); Towson, MD
November 30, 2017*; 7:00 p.m.		Wagner	W 64–42	2–4	SECU Arena (186); Towson, MD
December 5, 2017*; 7:00 p.m.		Saint Joseph's	W 90–66	3–4	SECU Arena (209); Towson, MD
December 9, 2017*; 1:00 p.m.		at Loyola (MD)	W 76–67	4–4	Reitz Arena (787); Baltimore, MD
December 12, 2017*; 6:00 p.m.		at Norfolk State	L 76–86	4–5	Echols Hall (178); Norfolk, VA
December 21, 2017*; 5:15 p.m.		vs. Arkansas–Pine Bluff; Las Vegas Holiday Hoops Classic	W 70–44	5–5	South Point Arena; Enterprise, NV
December 22, 2017*; 3:00 p.m.		vs. Radford; Las Vegas Holiday Hoops Classic	L 66–69	5–6	South Point Arena; Enterprise, NV
CAA regular season
December 29, 2017; 7:00 p.m.		Northeastern	L 61–70	5–7 (0–1)	SECU Arena (206); Towson, MD
December 31, 2017; 12:00 p.m.		College of Charleston	L 67–80	5–8 (0–2)	SECU Arena (171); Towson, MD
January 5, 2018; 7:00 p.m.		at James Madison	L 45–69	5–9 (0–3)	JMU Convocation Center (1,818); Harrisonburg, VA
January 7, 2018; 2:00 p.m.		at William & Mary	W 67–66	6–9 (1–3)	Kaplan Arena (589); Williamsburg, VA
January 12, 2018; 7:00 p.m.		UNC Wilmington	W 72–71	7–9 (2–3)	SECU Arena (129); Towson, MD
January 14, 2018; 2:00 p.m.		at Delaware	L 49–51	7–10 (2–4)	Bob Carpenter Center (1,554); Newark, DE
January 19, 2018; 7:00 p.m.		at Elon	L 61–84	7–11 (2–5)	Alumni Gym (872); Elon, NC
January 21, 2018; 2:00 p.m.		at College of Charleston	W 83–58	8–11 (3–5)	TD Arena (290); Charleston, SC
January 28, 2018; 2:00 p.m.		Elon	L 45–71	7–12 (3–6)	SECU Arena (564); Towson, MD
February 2, 2018; 7:00 p.m.		at Drexel	L 53–78	7–13 (3–7)	Daskalakis Athletic Center (508); Philadelphia, PA
February 4, 2018; 2:00 p.m.		William & Mary	L 63–75	7–14 (3–8)	SECU Arena (253); Towson, MD
February 9, 2018; 7:00 p.m.		Hofstra	W 73–72	8–14 (4–8)	SECU Arena (286); Towson, MD
February 11, 2018; 2:00 p.m.		James Madison	L 55–64	9–15 (4–9)	SECU Arena (457); Towson, MD
February 16, 2018; 7:00 p.m.		at Northeastern	L 61–79	9–16 (4–10)	Cabot Center (334); Boston, MA
February 18, 2018; 2:00 p.m.		at Hofstra	L 72–83	9–17 (4–11)	Hofstra Arena (1,020); Hempstead, NY
February 25, 2018; 2:00 p.m.		Drexel	L 54–62	9–18 (4–12)	SECU Arena (423); Towson, MD
March 1, 2018; 7:00 p.m.		at UNC Wilmington	L 53–64	9–19 (4–13)	Trask Coliseum (623); Wilmington, NC
March 3, 2018; 2:00 p.m.		Delaware	L 55–81	9–20 (4–14)	SECU Arena (455); Towson, MD
CAA tournament
March 7, 2018; 12:00 p.m.	(9)	vs. (8) UNC Wilmington; First round	L 47–58	9–21	Daskalakis Athletic Center; Philadelphia, PA
*Non-conference game. ^{#}Rankings from AP poll. (#) Tournament seedings in parentheses. All times are in Eastern.

== See also ==
- 2017–18 Towson Tigers men's basketball team
