= 2017–18 UNC Wilmington Seahawks women's basketball team =

Intercollegiate basketball season

2017–18 UNC Wilmington Seahawks women's basketball
- Conference: Colonial Athletic Association
- Record: 12–19 (4–14 CAA)
- Head coach: Karen Barefoot (1st season)
- Assistant coaches: Tina Martin; David Caputo; Brittany Morris
- Home arena: Trask Coliseum

2017–18 CAA women's basketball standings
	Conf.				Overall
Team	W		L	PCT	W		L	PCT
Drexel	16	–	2	.889	27	–	8	.771
James Madison	16	–	2	.889	23	–	11	.676
Elon †	14	–	4	.778	25	–	8	.758
Delaware	11	–	7	.611	19	–	13	.594
Northeastern	11	–	7	.611	16	–	15	.516
William & Mary	7	–	11	.389	16	–	14	.533
Hofstra	5	–	13	.278	11	–	19	.367
UNC Wilmington	4	–	14	.222	12	–	19	.387
Towson	4	–	14	.222	9	–	21	.300
College of Charleston	2	–	16	.111	7	–	24	.226
† 2018 CAA tournament winner Rankings from AP poll

The 2017–18 UNC Wilmington Seahawks women's basketball team represented the University of North Carolina Wilmington during the 2017–18 NCAA Division I women's basketball season. The Seahawks, led by first year head coach Karen Barefoot, played their home games at the Trask Coliseum and were members of the Colonial Athletic Association (CAA). They finished the season 12–19, 4–14 in CAA play to finish in a tie for eight place. They advance to the quarterfinals of the CAA women's tournament, where they lost to Drexel.

== Roster ==
2017–18 UNC Wilmington Seahawks women's basketball team
Players
Coaches

Pos.	#	Name	Height	Year	Previous school	Hometown
G	0	Ashli Jeune (redshirt)	5 ft 10 in (1.78 m)	RS Jr	Life Center Academy; Rutgers	Westampton, NJ
F	1	Paige Powell	6 ft 2 in (1.88 m)	Fr	East Columbus	Hallsboro, NC
G	2	Moriah Crisp	5 ft 2 in (1.57 m)	So	Bishop McNamara	Waldorf, MD
G	3	Katelyn Weems	5 ft 9 in (1.75 m)	So	North Greene	Chuckey, TN
G	4	Shrita Parker (redshirt)	5 ft 7 in (1.7 m)	Sr	Ocean Lakes; Rutgers	Virginia Beach, VA
G	5	Madison Raque	5 ft 8 in (1.73 m)	Sr	Eastern	Louisville, KY
G	10	Gigi Smith (redshirt)	5 ft 10 in (1.78 m)	Jr	Lake Taylor; Old Dominion	Norfolk, VA
F	11	Micah Hoggatt	6 ft 0 in (1.83 m)	Fr	Salem	Conyers, GA
G	12	Julia Buehler	5 ft 7 in (1.7 m)	Jr	John T. Hoggard; Appalachian State	Wilmington, NC
G	13	Lacey Suggs	5 ft 10 in (1.78 m)	So	East Bladen	White Lake, NC
G	14	Timber Tate	5 ft 11 in (1.8 m)	So	Forest Trail Academy	Thomasville, NC
F	21	Jenny DeGraaf	6 ft 1 in (1.85 m)	RS Sr	Springboro; Penn State	Springboro, OH
F	24	Chinyere Bell	6 ft 0 in (1.83 m)	Jr	South View; George Mason	Fayetteville, NC
G	25	Diamond Willis	6 ft 0 in (1.83 m)	Sr	C.E. Byrd; Bossier Parish CC	Shreveport, LA
C	32	Rebekah Banks	6 ft 1 in (1.85 m)	Sr	Cary Academy	Durham, NC
G	33	Grace Sacco	5 ft 5 in (1.65 m)	Fr	Ocean City	Ocean City, NJ
G	34	Sierra Clayborn	5 ft 8 in (1.73 m)	Sr	Evanston Township; State Fair CC	Chicago, IL

Head coach

- Karen Barefoot (Christopher Newport)

Assistant coach(es)

- Tina Martin (Lock Haven)
- David Caputo (Montclair State)
- Brittany Morris (Seton Hall)

Legend

- (C) Team captain
- (S) Suspended
- (I) Ineligible
- (W) Walk-on
- Injured
- Current redshirt

Roster
Last update: December 22, 2017

== Schedule ==
Date time, TV	Rank^{#}	Opponent^{#}	Result	Record	Site (attendance) city, state
Exhibition
10/29/2017*; 2:00 pm		Greensboro	W 81–37		Trask Coliseum (743); Wilmington, NC
Non-conference regular season
11/12/2017*; 2:00 pm		UNC Pembroke	W 73–64	1–0	Trask Coliseum (803); Wilmington, NC
11/15/2017*; 7:00 pm		East Carolina	W 66–62	2–0	Trask Coliseum (927); Wilmington, NC
11/18/2017*; 2:00 pm		at Coastal Carolina	L 41–57	2–1	HTC Center (276); Conway, SC
11/22/2017*; 2:00 pm		at North Carolina	L 60–86	2–2	Carmichael Arena (2,823); Chapel Hill, NC
11/24/2017*; 4:00 pm		Catawba	W 74–59	3–2	Trask Coliseum (664); Wilmington, NC
11/26/2017*; 2:00 pm		at Furman	L 71–76	3–3	Timmons Arena (318); Greenville, SC
11/29/2017*; 7:00 pm		VCU	W 83–67	4–3	Trask Coliseum (856); Wilmington, NC
12/03/2017*; 2:00 pm		North Carolina Central	W 89–63	5–3	Trask Coliseum (673); Wilmington, NC
12/09/2017*; 1:00 pm		at Pittsburgh	L 55–74	5–4	Peterson Events Center (621); Pittsburgh, PA
12/16/2017*; 7:00 pm		at Wofford	W 65–60	6–4	Jerry Richardson Indoor Stadium (240); Spartanburg, SC
12/21/2017*; 1:00 pm		Georgia State	W 74–62	7–4	Trask Coliseum (904); Wilmington, NC
CAA regular season
12/29/2017; 7:00 pm		at Elon	L 67–75	7–5 (0–1)	Alumni Gym (951); Elon, NC
12/31/2017; 2:00 pm		William & Mary	L 53–66	7–6 (0–2)	Trask Coliseum (718); Wilmington, NC
01/05/2018; 4:00 pm		Northeastern	L 47–54	7–7 (0–3)	Trask Coliseum (421); Wilmington, NC
01/07/2018; 1:00 pm		Hofstra	L 61–69	7–8 (0–4)	Trask Coliseum (593); Wilmington, NC
01/12/2018; 7:00 pm		at Towson	L 71–72	7–9 (0–5)	SECU Arena (129); Towson, MD
01/14/2018; 2:00 pm		at Drexel	L 42–68	7–9 (0–5)	Daskalakis Athletic Center (556); Philadelphia, PA
01/19/2018; 7:00 pm		Delaware	L 49–82	7–10 (0–6)	Trask Coliseum (819); Wilmington, NC
01/21/2018; 2:00 pm		James Madison	L 48–63	7–11 (0–7)	Trask Coliseum (895); Wilmington, NC
01/28/2018; 1:00 pm		at Delaware	L 62–80	7–13 (0–9)	Bob Carpenter Center (1,554); Philadelphia, PA
02/02/2018; 7:00 pm		at Northeastern	L 39–56	7–14 (0–10)	Cabot Center (288); Boston, MA
02/04/2018; 1:00 pm		at Hofstra	W 59–55	8–14 (1–10)	Hofstra Arena (454); Hempstead, NY
02/09/2018; 7:00 pm		College of Charleston	L 63–72	8–15 (1–11)	Trask Coliseum (857); Wilmington, NC
02/11/2018; 1:00 pm		Drexel	L 40–58	8–16 (1–12)	Trask Coliseum (808); Wilmington, NC
02/16/2018; 7:00 pm		at William & Mary	W 64–49	9–16 (2–12)	Kaplan Arena (641); Williamsburg, VA
02/18/2018; 2:00 pm		at James Madison	L 48–65	9–17 (2–13)	JMU Convocation Center (2,636); Harrisonburg, VA
02/23/2018; 11:30 am		at College of Charleston	W 76–60	10–17 (3–13)	TD Arena (3,209); Charleston, SC
03/01/2018; 7:00 pm		Towson	W 64–53	11–17 (4–13)	Trask Coliseum (623); Wilmington, NC
03/03/2018; 2:00 pm		Elon	L 67–75	11–18 (4–14)	Trask Coliseum (743); Wilmington, NC
CAA Women's Tournament
03/07/2018; 12:00 pm	(8)	vs. (9) Towson; First Round	W 58–47	12–18	Daskalakis Athletic Center; Philadelphia, PA
03/08/2018; 12:00 pm	(8)	at (1) Drexel; Quarterfinals	L 41–71	12–19	Daskalakis Athletic Center; Philadelphia, PA
*Non-conference game. ^{#}Rankings from AP Poll. (#) Tournament seedings in parentheses. All times are in Eastern Time.

== See also ==
- 2017–18 UNC Wilmington Seahawks men's basketball team
