= 2017–18 Northeastern Huskies women's basketball team =

Intercollegiate basketball season

2017–18 Northeastern Huskies women's basketball

WBI, First Round
- Conference: Colonial Athletic Association
- Record: 16–15 (11–7 CAA)
- Head coach: Kelly Cole (4th season)
- Assistant coaches: Whitney Edwards; Mike Leflar; Kindyll Dorsey
- Home arena: Cabot Center; Matthews Arena

2017–18 CAA women's basketball standings
	Conf.				Overall
Team	W		L	PCT	W		L	PCT
Drexel	16	–	2	.889	27	–	8	.771
James Madison	16	–	2	.889	23	–	11	.676
Elon †	14	–	4	.778	25	–	8	.758
Delaware	11	–	7	.611	19	–	13	.594
Northeastern	11	–	7	.611	16	–	15	.516
William & Mary	7	–	11	.389	16	–	14	.533
Hofstra	5	–	13	.278	11	–	19	.367
UNC Wilmington	4	–	14	.222	12	–	19	.387
Towson	4	–	14	.222	9	–	21	.300
College of Charleston	2	–	16	.111	7	–	24	.226
† 2018 CAA tournament winner Rankings from AP poll

The 2017–18 Northeastern Huskies women's basketball team represented the Northeastern University during the 2017–18 NCAA Division I women's basketball season. The Huskies, led by fourth year head coach Kelly Cole, played their home games at the Cabot Center and were members of the Colonial Athletic Association (CAA). They finished the season 16–15, 11–7 CAA play to finish in a tie for fourth place. They lost in the quarterfinals of the CAA women's tournament to Delaware. They were invited to the Women's Basketball Invitational, where they lost to Yale in the first round.

== Previous season ==
They finished the season 12–19, 8–10 CAA play to finish in sixth place. They lost in the quarterfinals of the CAA women's tournament to Drexel.

== Roster ==
2017–18 Northeastern Huskies women's basketball team
Players
Coaches

Pos.	#	Name	Height	Year	Previous school	Hometown
G	1	Zoe Zwerling	5 ft 8 in (1.73 m)	Jr	Henry M. Gunn	Palo Alto, CA
G	2	Jasmin Watson	5 ft 7 in (1.7 m)	Fr	West Windsor-Plainsboro North	Princeton, NJ
G	3	Loren Lassiter	5 ft 11 in (1.8 m)	Sr	Bishop O'Dowd	Castro Valley, CA
G	4	Claudia Oritz	5 ft 7 in (1.7 m)	RS Sr	San Jorge Academy; Ole Miss	Carolina, PR
G	11	Stella Clark	5 ft 4 in (1.63 m)	Fr	Manasquan	Sea Girt, NJ
G	12	Ayanna Dublin	5 ft 10 in (1.78 m)	So	Grace Church School	Brooklyn, NY
G	14	Shannon Todd	5 ft 10 in (1.78 m)	So	York	York, ME
G	20	Jess Genco	5 ft 5 in (1.65 m)	Jr	Scranton Prep	Scranton, PA
F	21	Samantha Michel	6 ft 0 in (1.83 m)	Fr	Apex	Apex, NC
G	22	Te'Erica Eason	5 ft 8 in (1.73 m)	Jr	The Lovett School	Atlanta, GA
F	23	Courtney Redcross	6 ft 0 in (1.83 m)	So	The Shipley School	West Chester, PA
F	24	Gabriella Giacone	6 ft 0 in (1.83 m)	Jr	Bethlehem Central	Delmar, NY
F	25	Jasmine Braswell	6 ft 2 in (1.88 m)	So	Broad Run	Ashburn, VA
F	32	Maureen Taggart	5 ft 11 in (1.8 m)	Sr	Tilton School	Wallingford, VT
F	42	Rachel Aho (redshirt)	6 ft 3 in (1.91 m)	Jr	Marianapolis Prep; Providence	Holden, MA

Head coach

- Kelly Cole (Northwestern)

Assistant coach(es)

- Whitney Edwards (New Hampshire)
- Mike Leflar (Boston College)
- Kindyll Dorsey (Boston College)

Legend

- (C) Team captain
- (S) Suspended
- (I) Ineligible
- (W) Walk-on
- Injured
- Current redshirt

Roster
Last update: December 22, 2017

== Schedule ==
Date time, TV	Rank^{#}	Opponent^{#}	Result	Record	Site (attendance) city, state
Non-conference regular season
11/10/2017*; 5:30 pm		at Boston University	L 73–74	0–1	Case Gym (1,535); Boston, MA
11/14/2017*; 7:00 pm		Providence	L 95–98 ^{OT}	0–2	Cabot Center (338); Boston, MA
11/14/2017*; 7:00 pm		Fairfield	W 63–43	1–2	Cabot Center (352); Boston, MA
11/19/2017*; 2:00 pm		Marist	W 78–72	2–2	Cabot Center (297); Boston, MA
11/24/2017*; 1:00 pm		at UMass; UMass Thanksgiving Classic	W 64–54	3–2	Mullins Center (387); Amherst, MA
11/24/2017*; 11:00 am		vs. Houston; UMass Thanksgiving Classic	L 64–72	3–3	Mullins Center (396); Amherst, MA
12/01/2017*; 7:00 pm, ESPN3		at New Hampshire	L 50–65	3–4	Lundholm Gym (312); Durham, NH
12/06/2017*; 12:00 pm		Harvard	L 59–69	3–5	Matthews Arena (2,043); Boston, MA
12/16/2017*; 2:00 pm, ESPN3		at Vermont	W 71–66	4–5	Patrick Gym (259); Burlington, VT
12/20/2017*; 8:00 pm		vs. New Mexico State; Beach Classic semifinals	W 65–64	5–5	Walter Pyramid (712); Long Beach, CA
12/21/2017*; 5:00 pm		vs. Illinois State; Beach Classic championship game	L 55–65	5–6	Walter Pyramid (684); Long Beach, CA
CAA regular season
12/29/2017; 7:00 pm		at Towson	W 70–61	6–6 (1–0)	SECU Arena (206); Towson, MD
12/31/2017; 1:00 pm		James Madison	L 57–60	6–7 (1–1)	Cabot Center (307); Boston, MA
01/05/2018; 4:00 pm		at UNC Wilmington	W 54–47	7–7 (2–1)	Trask Coliseum (421); Wilmington, NC
01/07/2018; 2:00 pm		at Elon	L 71–78	7–8 (2–2)	Alumni Gym (789); Elon, NC
01/12/2018; 7:00 pm		College of Charleston	W 59–37	8–8 (3–2)	Cabot Center (348); Boston, MA
01/19/2018; 7:00 pm		Drexel	L 58–69	8–9 (3–3)	Cabot Center (816); Boston, MA
01/21/2018; 2:00 pm, NESN+		William & Mary	W 64–46	9–9 (4–3)	Cabot Center (347); Boston, MA
01/26/2018; 7:00 pm		at Delaware	W 64–53	10–9 (5–3)	Bob Carpenter Center (1,539); Newark, DE
01/28/2018; 2:00 pm		at Drexel	L 56–58	10–10 (5–4)	Daskalakis Athletic Center (816); Philadelphia, PA
02/02/2018; 7:00 pm		UNC Wilmington	W 56–39	11–10 (6–4)	Cabot Center (288); Boston, MA
02/04/2018; 2:00 pm		Delaware	W 73–59	12–10 (7–4)	Cabot Center (392); Boston, MA
02/09/2017; 7:00 pm		at James Madison	L 43–72	12–11 (7–5)	JMU Convocation Center (2,496); Towson, MD
02/11/2018; 2:00 pm		at William & Mary	L 53–71	12–12 (7–6)	Kaplan Arena (1,003); Williamsburg, VA
02/16/2018; 7:00 pm		Towson	W 79–61	13–12 (8–6)	Cabot Center (334); Boston, MA
02/18/2018; 2:00 pm, NESN		Elon	L 46–65	13–13 (8–7)	Cabot Center (311); Boston, MA
02/23/2018; 7:00 pm		at Hofstra	W 55–50	14–13 (9–7)	Hofstra Arena (448); Hempstead, NY
02/25/2018; 2:00 pm		at College of Charleston	W 67–48	15–13 (10–7)	TD Arena (427); Charleston, SC
03/02/2018; 2:00 pm		Hofstra	W 58–54	16–13 (11–7)	Cabot Center (279); Boston, MA
CAA Women's Tournament
03/08/2018; 2:30 pm	(4)	vs. (5) Delaware; Quarterfinals	L 50–61	16–14	Daskalakis Athletic Center (2,053); Philadelphia, PA
WBI
03/15/2018*; 7:00 pm		Yale; First Round	L 58–68	16–15	Cabot Center (232); Boston, MA
*Non-conference game. ^{#}Rankings from AP Poll. (#) Tournament seedings in parentheses. All times are in Eastern Time.

== See also ==
2017–18 Northeastern Huskies men's basketball team
