= 2017–18 William & Mary Tribe women's basketball team =

Intercollegiate basketball season

2017–18 William & Mary Tribe women's basketball
- Conference: Colonial Athletic Association
- Record: 16–14 (7–11 CAA)
- Head coach: Ed Swanson (5th season)
- Assistant coaches: Chanel Murchison; Lynne-Ann Kokoski; Sarah Eichler
- Home arena: Kaplan Arena

2017–18 CAA women's basketball standings
	Conf.				Overall
Team	W		L	PCT	W		L	PCT
Drexel	16	–	2	.889	27	–	8	.771
James Madison	16	–	2	.889	23	–	11	.676
Elon †	14	–	4	.778	25	–	8	.758
Delaware	11	–	7	.611	19	–	13	.594
Northeastern	11	–	7	.611	16	–	15	.516
William & Mary	7	–	11	.389	16	–	14	.533
Hofstra	5	–	13	.278	11	–	19	.367
UNC Wilmington	4	–	14	.222	12	–	19	.387
Towson	4	–	14	.222	9	–	21	.300
College of Charleston	2	–	16	.111	7	–	24	.226
† 2018 CAA tournament winner Rankings from AP poll

The 2017–18 William & Mary Tribe women's basketball team represented the College of William & Mary during the 2017–18 NCAA Division I women's basketball season. The Tribe, led by fifth-year head coach Ed Swanson, play their home games at Kaplan Arena and were members of the Colonial Athletic Association (CAA). They finished the season 16–14, 7–11 in CAA play, to finish in sixth place. They lost in the quarterfinals of the CAA women's tournament to Elon.

== Roster ==
2017–18 William & Mary Tribe women's basketball team
Players
Coaches

Pos.	#	Name	Height	Year	Previous school	Hometown
G	0	Libby Underwood	5 ft 9 in (1.75 m)	Fr	Portsmouth	Rye, NH
G	2	Bianca Boggs	5 ft 8 in (1.73 m)	Jr	St. Mary's Ryken	Waldorf, MD
G	3	Ashley Taylor	6 ft 0 in (1.83 m)	So	St. Anne's-Belfield	Charlottesville, VA
G/F	4	Jeanne Gaumont	6 ft 0 in (1.83 m)	Sr	Champlain College Saint-Lambert	Saint-Lambert, QC
G/F	5	Misha Jones	5 ft 9 in (1.75 m)	Jr	Battlefield	Manassas Park, VA
G	10	Nari Garner	5 ft 7 in (1.7 m)	So	Freedom	Tampa, FL
G	11	Nyla Pollard	5 ft 9 in (1.75 m)	Fr	Princess Anne	Virginia Beach, VA
F	12	Jenna Green	5 ft 7 in (1.7 m)	Sr	Centerville	Clifton, VA
G	15	Tyra Cox	5 ft 8 in (1.73 m)	Fr	Lake Highland Prep	Winter Garden, FL
C	20	Chandler Smith	6 ft 3 in (1.91 m)	Jr	St. Mary's Ryken	Port Tobacco, MD
G/F	21	Bailey Eichner	6 ft 1 in (1.85 m)	Fr	Cudhay	Cudahy, WI
C	24	Abby Rendle	6 ft 4 in (1.93 m)	Sr	South Lakes	Reston, VA
C	25	Gabby Rogers	6 ft 1 in (1.85 m)	Fr	Bishop Lynch	Dallas, TX
F	30	Victoria Reynolds	5 ft 10 in (1.78 m)	So	Archbishop Spalding	Pasadena, MD
G	31	Harper Birdsong (redshirt)	5 ft 10 in (1.78 m)	So	Nansemond-Suffolk Academy; George Washington	Suffolk, VA

Head coach

- Ed Swanson (Sacred Heart)

Assistant coach(es)

- Chanel Murchison (William & Mary)
- Lynne-Ann Kokoski (Bryant)
- Sarah Eichler (Green Bay)

Legend

- (C) Team captain
- (S) Suspended
- (I) Ineligible
- (W) Walk-on
- Injured
- Current redshirt

Roster
Last update: June 28, 2024

== Schedule ==
Date time, TV	Rank^{#}	Opponent^{#}	Result	Record	Site (attendance) city, state
Non-conference regular season
11/11/2017*; 6:00 p.m.		at Howard	W 83–71	1–0	Burr Gymnasium (450); Washington, D.C.
11/14/2017*; 7:00 p.m.		Fairfield	W 57–47	2–0	Kaplan Arena (322); Williamsburg, VA
11/17/2017*; 7:00 p.m., ESPN3		at St. John's	L 81–92	2–1	Carnesecca Arena (323); Queens, NY
11/21/2017*; 7:00 p.m.		at East Carolina	W 71–65 ^{OT}	3–1	Williams Arena (841); Greensboro, NC
11/25/2017*; 3:00 p.m.		Loyola (MD)	W 70–49	4–1	Kaplan Arena (345); Williamsburg, VA
11/27/2017*; 7:00 p.m.		Davidson	W 73–55	5–1	Kaplan Arena (376); Williamsburg, VA
11/29/2017*; 3:00 p.m.		at Richmond	W 78–64	6–1	Robins Center (353); Richmond, VA
12/02/2017*; 2:00 p.m.		at Saint Francis (PA)	W 92–86	7–1	DeGol Arena (1,021); Loretto, PA
12/05/2017*; 7:00 p.m.		USC Upstate	W 83–63	8–1	Kaplan Arena (549); Williamsburg, VA
12/17/2017*; 5:00 p.m.		Old Dominion; Rivalry	W 75–58	9–1	Kaplan Arena (2,880); Williamsburg, VA
12/21/2017*; 2:00 p.m.		Norfolk State	L 74–80 ^{OT}	9–2	Kaplan Arena (531); Williamsburg, VA
CAA regular season
12/29/2017; 6:30 p.m.		at College of Charleston	W 68–54	10–2 (1–0)	TD Arena (436); Charleston, SC
12/31/2017; 2:00 p.m.		at UNC Wilmington	W 66–53	11–2 (2–0)	Trask Coliseum (718); Wilmington, NC
01/05/2018; 7:00 p.m.		Drexel; Postponed to January 9 (snow)			Kaplan Arena; Williamsburg, VA
01/07/2018; 2:00 p.m.		Towson	L 66–67	11–3 (2–1)	Kaplan Arena (589); Williamsburg, VA
01/09/2018; 6:00 p.m.		Drexel; Rescheduled from January 5	L 58–68	11–4 (2–2)	Kaplan Arena (561); Williamsburg, VA
01/14/2018; 2:00 p.m.		Elon	W 81–75	12–4 (3–2)	Kaplan Arena (543); Williamsburg, VA
01/19/2018; 11:30 a.m.		at Hofstra	L 54–65	12–5 (3–3)	Hofstra Arena (2,262); Hempstead, NY
01/21/2018; 2:00 p.m.		at Northeastern	L 46–64	12–6 (3–4)	Cabot Center (347); Boston, MA
01/26/2018; 7:00 p.m.		College of Charleston	W 79–66	13–6 (4–4)	Kaplan Arena (636); Williamsburg, VA
01/28/2018; 2:00 p.m.		Hofstra	W 63–53	14–6 (5–4)	Kaplan Arena (692); Williamsburg, VA
02/02/2018; 7:00 p.m.		James Madison	L 41–86	12–7 (3–5)	Kaplan Arena (856); Williamsburg, VA
02/04/2018; 2:00 p.m.		at Towson	W 75–63	15–7 (6–5)	SECU Arena (253); Towson, MD
02/09/2018; 7:00 p.m.		at Delaware	L 59–68	15–8 (6–6)	Bob Carpenter Center (1,359); Newark, DE
02/11/2018; 2:00 p.m.		Northeastern	W 71–53	16–8 (7–6)	Kaplan Arena (347); Williamsburg, VA
02/16/2018; 7:00 p.m.		UNC Wilmington	L 49–64	16–9 (7–7)	Kaplan Arena (641); Williamsburg, VA
02/18/2018; 2:00 p.m.		at Drexel	L 34–54	16–10 (7–8)	Daskalakis Athletic Center (802); Philadelphia, PA
02/23/2018; 7:00 p.m.		Delaware	L 52–61	16–11 (7–9)	Kaplan Arena (731); Williamsburg, VA
03/01/2018; 7:00 p.m.		at Elon	L 61–82	16–12 (7–10)	Alumni Gym (1,329); Elon, NC
03/03/2018; 2:00 p.m.		at James Madison	L 64–70	16–13 (7–11)	JMU Convocation Center (2,115); Harrisonburg, VA
CAA women's tournament
03/08/2018; 7:30 p.m.	(6)	vs. (3) Elon; Quarterfinals	L 50–67	16–14	Daskalakis Athletic Center (2,053); Philadelphia, PA
*Non-conference game. ^{#}Rankings from AP poll. (#) Tournament seedings in parentheses. All times are in Eastern.

== See also ==
- 2017–18 William & Mary Tribe men's basketball team
