= 2018 CAA women's basketball tournament =

- Classification: Division I
- Season: 2017–18
- Teams: 10
- Site: Daskalakis Athletic Center; Philadelphia, PA
- Champions: Elon (2nd title)
- Winning coach: Charlotte Smith (2nd title)
- MVP: Shay Burnett (Elon)
- Television: NBCSN, CAA.tv
- CAA women's basketball tournaments

2017–18 CAA women's basketball standings
	Conf.				Overall
Team	W		L	PCT	W		L	PCT
Drexel	16	–	2	.889	27	–	8	.771
James Madison	16	–	2	.889	23	–	11	.676
Elon †	14	–	4	.778	25	–	8	.758
Delaware	11	–	7	.611	19	–	13	.594
Northeastern	11	–	7	.611	16	–	15	.516
William & Mary	7	–	11	.389	16	–	14	.533
Hofstra	5	–	13	.278	11	–	19	.367
UNC Wilmington	4	–	14	.222	12	–	19	.387
Towson	4	–	14	.222	9	–	21	.300
College of Charleston	2	–	16	.111	7	–	24	.226
† 2018 CAA tournament winner Rankings from AP poll

The 2018 Colonial Athletic Association women's basketball tournament is a postseason event that was held from March 7–10, 2018 at the Daskalakis Athletic Center in Philadelphia. The champion received an automatic bid to the 2018 NCAA tournament.

== Seeds ==
Seed	School	Conference	Overall	Tiebreaker 1	Tiebreaker 2	Tiebreaker 3
1	‡† Drexel	16–2	24–6	1–1 vs. JMU	1–1 vs. Elon, 14–0 vs. remainder of CAA	RPI: 45
2	† James Madison	16–2	20–9	1–1 vs. Drexel	1–1 vs. Elon, 14–0 vs. remainder of CAA	RPI: 63
3	† Elon	14–4	22–7			
4	† Northeastern	11–7	16–13	2–0 vs. UD		
5	† Delaware	11–7	18–11	0–2 vs. NE		
6	† William & Mary	7–11	16–13			
7	Hofstra	5–13	11–18			
8	UNCW	4–14	11–18	1–1 vs. Towson	1–1 vs. each of W&M, Hofstra, and Charleston; 0–10 vs. remainder of CAA	RPI: 257
9	Towson	4–14	9–20	1–1 vs. UNCW	1–1 vs. each of W&M, Hofstra, and Charleston; 0–10 vs. remainder of CAA	RPI: 270
10	College of Charleston	2–16	6–23			
‡ – CAA regular season champions. † – Received a bye in the conference tournament. Records are as of the end of the regular season.

== Schedule ==
Session	Game	Time*	Matchup^{#}	Television
First round – Wednesday March 7, 2018
1	1	2:00 PM	#9 Towson vs #8 UNCW	CAA.tv
1	2	4:30 PM	#10 Charleston vs #7 Hofstra	CAA.tv
Quarterfinals – Thursday March 8, 2018
2	3	12:00 PM	#8 UNCW vs #1 Drexel	CAA.tv
2	4	2:30 PM	#5 Delaware vs #4 Northeastern	CAA.tv
3	5	5:00 PM	#10 Charleston vs #2 James Madison	CAA.tv
3	6	7:30 PM	#6 William & Mary vs #3 Elon	CAA.tv
Semifinals – Friday March 9, 2018
4	7	3:00 PM	#1 Drexel vs #5 Delaware	CAA.tv
4	8	5:30 PM	#2 James Madison vs #3 Elon	CAA.tv
Championship – Saturday March 10, 2018
5	9	1:00 PM	#1 Drexel vs #3 Elon	NBC Sports
*Game times in ET. #-Rankings denote tournament seed

== Bracket ==
First round Wednesday, March 7 CAA.tv
8	UNCW	58
9	Towson	47
7	Hofstra	72
10	College of Charleston	88

Quarterfinals; Thursday, March 8 CAA.tv
1	Drexel	71
8	UNCW	41
4	Northeastern	50
5	Delaware	61
2	James Madison	81
10	College of Charleston	66
3	Elon	67
6	William & Mary	50

Semifinals; Friday, March 9 CAA.tv
1	Drexel	58
5	Delaware	53
2	James Madison	53
3	Elon	76

Final; Saturday, March 10; NBC Sports
1	Drexel	45
3	Elon	57

== See also ==
- 2018 CAA men's basketball tournament
