= Krista Kilburn-Steveskey =

Biographical details
- Born: June 28, 1968 (age 58); Fayetteville, Georgia, U.S.

Playing career
- 1986–1990: NC State

Coaching career (HC unless noted)
- 1992–1996: Sandy Creek HS (Asst.)
- 1996–2002: Wheeler HS
- 2002–2006: James Madison (Asst.)
- 2006–2019: Hofstra

Head coaching record
- Overall: 213–198 (college)

Krista Kilburn-Steveskey (born June 28, 1968) is an American former head coach of the Hofstra University women's basketball team. Before becoming the head coach at Hofstra, she served as an assistant coach for the James Madison University women's basketball team for four seasons.

As the head coach at Wheeler High School in Marietta, Georgia, Kilburn-Steveskey quickly turned around a struggling Lady Wildcat program. In her second season at the helm, she led Wheeler to the GHSA Class AAAA Girls State Championship in 1998.

During her tenure as head coach at Wheeler from 1996 to 2002, Kilburn-Steveskey compiled a 143–38 record. She was honored as the Georgia Class AAAA Coach of the Year in 1998.

Kilburn-Steveskey played college basketball under Hall of Fame coach Kay Yow at North Carolina State from 1986 to 1990.

== Head coaching record ==
Record table
| Season | Team | Overall | Conference | Standing | Postseason |
|---|---|---|---|---|---|
Hofstra Pride (Colonial Athletic Association) (2006–2019)
| 2006–07 | Hofstra | 26–8 | 13–5 | 4th | WNIT Quarterfinals |
| 2007–08 | Hofstra | 5–25 | 3–15 | T-12th | |
| 2008–09 | Hofstra | 16–14 | 8–10 | T-6th | |
| 2009–10 | Hofstra | 20–14 | 11–7 | T-4th | WNIT Second Round |
| 2010–11 | Hofstra | 19–12 | 10–8 | T-5th | |
| 2011–12 | Hofstra | 19–12 | 11–7 | T-4th | WNIT First Round |
| 2012–13 | Hofstra | 14–17 | 9–9 | 6th | |
| 2013–14 | Hofstra | 14–15 | 8–8 | 5th | |
| 2014–15 | Hofstra | 20–13 | 11–7 | 3rd | WNIT First Round |
| 2015–16 | Hofstra | 25–9 | 13–5 | T-2nd | WNIT Quarterfinals |
| 2016–17 | Hofstra | 13–18 | 5–13 | T-8th | |
| 2017–18 | Hofstra | 11–19 | 5–13 | 7th | |
| 2018–19 | Hofstra | 11–22 | 3–15 | T–9th | |
| Hofstra: | | 213–198 (.518) | 111–122 (.476) | | |
| Total: | | 213–198 (.518) | | | |
National champion Postseason invitational champion Conference regular season champion Conference regular season and conference tournament champion Division regular season champion Division regular season and conference tournament champion Conference tournament champion

== Personal ==
Kilburn-Steveskey is a native of Fayetteville, Georgia.
