= 2017–18 James Madison Dukes women's basketball team =

Intercollegiate basketball season

2017–18 James Madison Dukes women's basketball

CAA regular-season co-champions

WNIT, third round
- Conference: Colonial Athletic Association
- Record: 23–11 (16–2 CAA)
- Head coach: Sean O'Regan (2nd season)
- Assistant coaches: Bridgette Mitchell; Ian Caskill; Ashley Langford
- Home arena: JMU Convocation Center

2017–18 CAA women's basketball standings
	Conf.				Overall
Team	W		L	PCT	W		L	PCT
Drexel	16	–	2	.889	27	–	8	.771
James Madison	16	–	2	.889	23	–	11	.676
Elon †	14	–	4	.778	25	–	8	.758
Delaware	11	–	7	.611	19	–	13	.594
Northeastern	11	–	7	.611	16	–	15	.516
William & Mary	7	–	11	.389	16	–	14	.533
Hofstra	5	–	13	.278	11	–	19	.367
UNC Wilmington	4	–	14	.222	12	–	19	.387
Towson	4	–	14	.222	9	–	21	.300
College of Charleston	2	–	16	.111	7	–	24	.226
† 2018 CAA tournament winner Rankings from AP poll

The 2017–18 James Madison Dukes women's basketball team represented James Madison University during the 2017–18 NCAA Division I women's basketball season. The Dukes, led by second-year head coach Sean O'Regan, played their home games at the James Madison University Convocation Center and were members of the Colonial Athletic Association (CAA). They finished the season 23–11, 16–2 in CAA play, to win the CAA regular-season title with Drexel. They advanced to the semifinals of the CAA women's tournament, where they lost to Elon. They received an at-large bid to the WNIT, where they defeated East Tennessee State and Radford in the first and second rounds before losing to West Virginia in the third round.

== Previous season ==
The Dukes finished the 2016–17 season 26–9, 15–3 in CAA play, to finish in second place. They advanced to the championship game of the CAA women's tournament where they lost to Elon. They received an automatic bid to the Women's National Invitation Tournament where they defeated Radford and Virginia in the first and second rounds before losing to Villanova in the third round.

== Roster ==
2017–18 James Madison Dukes women's basketball team
Players
Coaches

Pos.	#	Name	Height	Year	Previous school	Hometown
G	1	Tori Harris	6 ft 0 in (1.83 m)	Fr	Half Hollow Hills West	Dix Hills, NY
G	3	Kamiah Smalls	5 ft 10 in (1.78 m)	So	Neumann Goretti	Philadelphia, PA
F	4	Tasia Butler	6 ft 1 in (1.85 m)	RS Sr	North Point; Syracuse	Waldorf, MD
F	5	Breyenne Bellerand	5 ft 10 in (1.78 m)	Fr	Immaculate Conception	Emerson, NJ
G	10	Aneah Young	5 ft 11 in (1.8 m)	Jr	Baltimore Polytechnic Institute	Baltimore, MD
G	13	Logan Reynolds	5 ft 7 in (1.7 m)	Jr	Central	Norton, VA
G	14	Hailee Barron	5 ft 10 in (1.78 m)	Sr	Rice	Burlington, VT
G	15	Lexie Barrier	5 ft 10 in (1.78 m)	So	Ironton	Ironton, OH
C	21	Debra Ferguson (redshirt)	6 ft 4 in (1.93 m)	Jr	Amherst County; Virginia	Madison Heights, VA
C	31	Kayla Cooper-Williams	6 ft 2 in (1.88 m)	RS So	C. D. Hylton	Dumfries, VA
F	33	Kelly Koshuta	6 ft 2 in (1.88 m)	RS So	James Madison; Virginia Tech	Vienna, VA
F	42	Devon Merritt	6 ft 2 in (1.88 m)	So	Berks Catholic	Reading, PA
G	55	Jackie Benitez (redshirt)	5 ft 10 in (1.78 m)	Jr	Pocono Mountain West; Siena	Tobyhanna, PA

Head coach

- Sean O'Regan (James Madison)

Assistant coach(es)

- Bridgette Mitchell (Duke)
- Ian Caskill (James Madison)
- Ashley Langford (Tulane)

Legend

- (C) Team captain
- (S) Suspended
- (I) Ineligible
- (W) Walk-on
- Injured
- Current redshirt

Roster
Last update: January 19, 2025

== Schedule ==
Date time, TV	Rank^{#}	Opponent^{#}	Result	Record	Site (attendance) city, state
Exhibition
November 5, 2017*; 2:00 p.m.		Christopher Newport	W 79–41		JMU Convocation Center; Harrisonburg, VA
Non-conference regular season
November 10, 2017*; 7:30 p.m.		Rutgers	L 63–76	0–1	JMU Convocation Center (4,598); Harrisonburg, VA
November 12, 2017*; 2:00 p.m.		Wagner	W 68–45	1–1	JMU Convocation Center (1,826); Harrisonburg, VA
November 15, 2017*; 7:00 p.m.		at No. 13 Tennessee	L 60–89	1–2	Thompson–Boling Arena (7,553); Knoxville, TN
November 19, 2017*; 2:00 p.m.		Saint Joseph's	L 66–73	1–3	JMU Convocation Center (1,850); Harrisonburg, VA
November 24, 2017*; 7:00 p.m.		vs. Villanova; TD Bank Classic semifinals	L 57–60	1–4	Patrick Gym (906); Burlington, VT
November 25, 2017*; 5:00 p.m., ESPN3		at Vermont; TD Bank Classic 3rd-place game	W 68–56	2–4	Patrick Gym (409); Burlington, VT
December 3, 2017*; 2:00 p.m.		No. 13 Florida State	L 63–79	2–5	JMU Convocation Center (2,092); Harrisonburg, VA
December 6, 2017*; 7:00 p.m.		Liberty	W 58–47	3–5	JMU Convocation Center (1,912); Harrisonburg, VA
December 9, 2017*; 7:00 p.m., ESPN3		at St. John's	L 64–81	3–6	Carnesecca Arena (809); Queens, NY
December 17, 2017*; 2:00 p.m.		at Dayton	L 54–82	3–7	UD Arena (1,665); Dayton, OH
December 21, 2017*; 1:00 p.m.		Bryant	W 67–36	4–7	JMU Convocation Center (1,961); Harrisonburg, VA
CAA regular season
December 29, 2017; 7:00 p.m.		at Hofstra	W 55–42	5–7 (1–0)	Hofstra Arena (448); Hempstead, NY
December 31, 2017; 1:00 p.m.		at Northeastern	W 60–57	6–7 (2–0)	Cabot Center (307); Boston, MA
January 5, 2018; 7:00 p.m.		Towson	W 69–45	7–7 (3–0)	JMU Convocation Center (1,818); Harrionsburg, VA
January 7, 2018; 2:00 p.m.		Drexel	W 58–46	8–7 (4–0)	JMU Convocation Center (1,849); Harrionsburg, VA
January 12, 2018; 7:00 p.m.		Elon	W 70–67	9–7 (5–0)	JMU Convocation Center (2,421); Harrionsburg, VA
January 19, 2018; 6:30 p.m.		at College of Charleston	W 67–45	10–7 (6–0)	TD Arena (404); Charleston, SC
January 21, 2018; 2:00 p.m.		at UNC Wilmington	W 63–48	11–7 (7–0)	Trask Coliseum (895); Wilmington, NC
January 26, 2018; 7:00 p.m.		Hofstra	W 73–56	12–7 (8–0)	JMU Convocation Center (2,000); Harrisonburg, VA
January 28, 2018; 2:00 p.m.		College of Charleston	W 70–67	13–7 (9–0)	JMU Convocation Center (3,661); Harrionsburg, VA
February 2, 2018; 7:00 p.m.		at William & Mary	W 86–41	14–7 (10–0)	Kaplan Arena (856); Williamsburg, VA
February 4, 2018; 2:00 p.m.		at Elon	L 43–50	14–8 (10–1)	Alumni Gym (848); Elon, NC
February 9, 2018; 7:00 p.m.		Northeastern	W 72–43	15–8 (11–1)	JMU Convocation Center (2,496); Harrisonburg, VA
February 11, 2018; 2:00 p.m.		Towson	W 64–55	16–8 (12–1)	SECU Arena (457); Towson, MD
February 16, 2018; 7:00 p.m.		at Delaware	W 56–53	17–8 (13–1)	Bob Carpenter Center (1,422); Newark, DE
February 18, 2018; 2:00 p.m.		UNC Wilmington	W 65–48	18–8 (14–1)	JMU Convocation Center (2,636); Harrisonburg, VA
February 23, 2018; 7:00 p.m.		at Drexel	L 71–73 ^{2OT}	18–9 (14–2)	Daskalakis Athletic Center (1,208); Philadelphia, PA
February 25, 2018; 2:00 p.m.		Delaware	W 67–56	19–9 (13–1)	JMU Convocation Center (3,494); Harrisonburg, VA
March 3, 2018; 2:00 p.m.		William & Mary	W 70–64	20–9 (16–2)	JMU Convocation Center (2,115); Harrisonburg, VA
CAA women's tournament
March 8, 2018; 5:00 p.m.	(2)	vs. (10) College of Charleston; Quarterfinals	W 81–66	21–9	Daskalakis Athletic Center (2,053); Philadelphia, PA
March 9, 2018; 3:00 p.m.	(2)	vs. (3) Elon; Semifinals	L 53–76	21–10	Daskalakis Athletic Center (2,120); Philadelphia, PA
WNIT
March 15, 2018*; 7:00 p.m.		East Tennessee State; First round	W 60–52	22–10	JMU Convocation Center (1,089); Harrisonburg, VA
March 17, 2018*; 7:00 p.m.		Radford; Second round	W 62–35	23–10	JMU Convocation Center (1,048); Harrisonburg, VA
March 23, 2018*; 5:30 p.m.		at West Virginia; Third round	L 55–67	23–11	WVU Coliseum (1,709); Morgantown, WV
*Non-conference game. ^{#}Rankings from AP poll. (#) Tournament seedings in parentheses. All times are in Eastern.

== Rankings ==
Regular-season polls
Poll	Pre- season	Week 2	Week 3	Week 4	Week 5	Week 6	Week 7	Week 8	Week 9	Week 10	Week 11	Week 12	Week 13	Week 14	Week 15	Week 16	Week 17	Week 18	Week 19	Final
AP																				N/A
Coaches																				

Legend
	Increase in ranking
	Decrease in ranking
	Not ranked previous week
(RV)	Received votes
(NR)	Not ranked

== See also ==
- 2017–18 James Madison Dukes men's basketball team
