= Diane Richardson =

American basketball coach

Current position
- Title: Head coach
- Team: Temple
- Conference: The American
- Record: 66–58 (.532)

Biographical details
- Education: Frostburg State

Coaching career (HC unless noted)
- 2000–2006: Riverdale Baptist School (GA)
- 2006–2007: American (assistant)
- 2007–2008: Maryland (assistant)
- 2009–2012: Riverdale Baptist School
- 2012–2016: George Washington (assistant)
- 2016–2017: West Virginia (assistant)
- 2017–2022: Towson
- 2022–present: Temple

Head coaching record
- Overall: 146–124 (.541)
- Tournaments: 0–1 (NCAA); 0–1 (WNIT)

Accomplishments and honors

Championships
- CAA tournament (2019); AAC regular season (2024)

Awards
- CAA Coach of the Year (2019); AAC Coach of the Year (2024)

Diane Richardson is an American basketball coach and currently the Head Coach of Temple Owls women's basketball team. Prior to coaching at Temple, she was head coach at Towson University from 2017 to 2022, an assistant coach and recruiting coordinator at West Virginia University from 2016 to 2017, following coaching stints at George Washington University from 2012 to 2016, the University of Maryland from 2007 to 2008, and American University from 2006 to 2007.

== Early life ==
Diane Richardson obtained her bachelor's degree in psychology and sociology from Frostburg State University where she participated in basketball and track and was a 1979 NCAA regional champion in both 200- and 400 meter races. In 1980 she earned a spot at the 1980 Summer Olympics but didn't participate. Four years later, she got her master's degree in management from Central Michigan University. She also was a founder of American Security Companies and Vice President of Bank of America's lending marketing team.

== Coaching career ==
=== Riverdale Baptist High School ===
From 2001 to 2006 she coached at Riverdale Baptist High in Upper Marlboro, Maryland, during which time her team won five championships.

=== American University ===
Following her success at Riverdale Baptist, she was hired as an assistant coach at American University.

=== Maryland ===
Richardson was hired as an assistant at Maryland in 2007 replacing Joanna Bernabei.

=== Return to Riverdale Baptist ===
Richardson returned to Riverdale Baptist as head coach in 2009 until 2012.

=== George Washington ===
In 2012, she was hired as an assistant coach at George Washington who went from 11 wins to 29 in just four years due to her coaching and made the NCAA Tournament in 2015 and 2016.

=== West Virginia ===
In 2016, Richardson was hired as an assistant coach at West Virginia Mountaineers.

=== Towson ===
In 2017 she was named the Head Coach of Towson Tigers women's basketball team. Her 2018–19 season began with signing of six new recruits. In the 2018–19 season, Richardson coached the Tigers to the first-ever CAA Championship title and the program's first appearance in the NCAA Tournament. She was named CAA and ECAC Coach of the Year.

=== Temple ===
Diane Richardson was named the 21st head women's basketball coach of Temple University on April 5, 2022. On April 20, 2022, Richardson and Temple announced that 5 members of her coaching staff at Towson, including associate head coach Zach Kancher would be joining her staff at Temple.

== Head coaching record ==
Record table
Season	Team	Overall	Conference	Standing	Postseason
Towson (Colonial Athletic Association) (2017–2022)
2017–18	Towson	9–21	4–14	9th	
2018–19	Towson	20–13	11–7	T–3rd	NCAA First Round
2019–20	Towson	14–15	9–9	4th	
2020–21	Towson	13–9	8–6	T–3rd	
2021–22	Towson	24–8	14–4	3rd	WNIT First Round
Towson:		80–66 (.548)	46–40 (.535)		
Temple (American Athletic Conference) (2023–present)
2022–23	Temple	11–18	6–10	T–8th	
2023–24	Temple	20–12	13–5	T–1st	
2024–25	Temple	20–11	13–5	4th	
2025–26	Temple	15–17	8–10	T–7th	
Temple:		66–58 (.532)	40–30 (.571)		
Total:		146–124 (.541)			
National champion Postseason invitational champion Conference regular season champion Conference regular season and conference tournament champion Division regular season champion Division regular season and conference tournament champion Conference tournament champion

== Personal life ==
Richardson is married and has four children.
