= Temple Owls women's basketball =

2025–26 Temple Owls women's basketball team
- University: Temple University
- Head coach: Diane Richardson (4th season)
- Location: Philadelphia, Pennsylvania
- Arena: Liacouras Center (capacity: 10,206)
- Conference: The American
- Nickname: Owls
- Colors: Cherry and white

NCAA Division I tournament second round
- 1989, 2005, 2007, 2010, 2011

NCAA Division I tournament appearances
- 1989, 2002, 2004, 2006, 2007, 2008, 2009, 2010, 2011, 2017

Conference tournament champions
- 2002, 2004, 2005, 2006

Conference regular-season champions
- 2002, 2004, 2005, 2008, 2024

Uniforms
Home	Away

The Temple Owls women's basketball team represents Temple University in women's basketball. The school competes in the American Athletic Conference in Division I of the National Collegiate Athletic Association (NCAA). The Owls play home basketball games at the Liacouras Center in Philadelphia, Pennsylvania, United States.

== Season-by-season record ==
As of the 2025–26 season, the Owls had an 948–792 record. They had made 10 appearances in the NCAA Tournament (1989, 2002, 2004, 2006, 2007, 2008, 2009, 2010, 2011, 2017), with a 5–11 record. They previously played in the Atlantic-10 Conference from 1983 to 2013. They had also made six appearances in the Women's National Invitation Tournament (WNIT) (1982, 1983, 2001, 2012, 2015, 2016). They had also finished as the Philadelphia Big 5 champions in 1983, 1986, 2002, 2005, 2006, 2007, 2008, 2009 (co-champ), 2011, 2017, 2020, and 2025.

Season	Coach	Record	Conference record	Postseason finish
1923–24	Blanche Voorhees Brown	12–0	n/a	n/a
1924–25	Blanche Voorhees Brown	6–6	n/a	n/a
1925–26	Blanche Voorhees Brown	1–5	n/a	n/a
1926–27	Viola Zuttig	2–3	n/a	n/a
1937–38	Blanche Voorhees Brown	3–1	n/a	n/a
1938–39	Blanche Voorhees Brown	4–2	n/a	n/a
1939–40	Blanche Voorhees Brown	6–1	n/a	n/a
1940–41	Patricia Collins	7–2	n/a	n/a
1941–42	Patricia Collins	5–3	n/a	n/a
1942–43	Patricia Collins	8–0	n/a	n/a
1943–44	Patricia Collins	9–0	n/a	n/a
1944–45	Vera Egner	10–0	n/a	n/a
1945–46	Vera Egner	7–1	n/a	n/a
1946–47	Grace Shuler McGoey	7–1	n/a	n/a
1947–48	Patricia Collins	6–2	n/a	n/a
1948–49	Patricia Collins	7–1	n/a	n/a
1949–50*	Marion Earl	5–2	n/a	n/a
1950–51	Marion Earl	6–2	n/a	n/a
1951–52	Patricia Collins Morris	5–3	n/a	n/a
1952–53	Anne McConaghie Volp	6–1	n/a	n/a
1953–54	Anne McConaghie Volp	7–1	n/a	n/a
1954–55*	Virginia Middleton	8–0	n/a	n/a
1955–56	Virginia Middleton	5–3	n/a	n/a
1956–57	Virginia Middleton	5–3	n/a	n/a
1957–58	Dorothy Miller	4–4	n/a	n/a
1958–59*	Dorothy Miller	5–2	n/a	n/a
1959–60	Annette Smith	1–7	n/a	n/a
1960–61	Jean Hamilton	5–5	n/a	n/a
1961–62	Jean Hamilton	4–5	n/a	n/a
1963–64	Nancy Rupp	1–9	n/a	n/a
1964–65	Nancy Rupp	5–4	n/a	n/a
1965–66	Carol Underwood	2–8	n/a	n/a
1974–75	Ronnie Maurek	7–8	n/a	n/a
1975–76	Ronnie Maurek	5–14	n/a	EAIAW Tournament
1976–77	Ronnie Maurek	2–12	n/a	n/a
1977–78	Ronnie Maurek	7–14	n/a	EAIAW Tournament
1978–79	Andy McGovern	8–11	n/a	n/a
1979–80	Andy McGovern	14–10	n/a	n/a
1980–81	Linda MacDonald	12–17	n/a	n/a
1981–82	Linda MacDonald	20–11	n/a	WNIT 5th place
1982–83	Linda MacDonald	19–12	n/a	n/a
1983–84	Linda MacDonald	17–10	5–3 (4th)	n/a
1984–85	Linda MacDonald	20–9	5–3 (4th)	n/a
1985–86	Linda MacDonald	15–13	8–8 (3rd)	n/a
1986–87	Linda MacDonald	11–18	9–9 (4th)	n/a
1987–88	Linda MacDonald	14–15	9–9 (5th)	n/a
1988–89	Linda MacDonald	22–10	14–4 (3rd)	NCAA second round
1989–90	Linda MacDonald	16–15	11–7 (5th)	n/a
1990–91	Charlene Curtis	13–15	10–8 (T-5th)	n/a
1991–92	Charlene Curtis	11–17	8–8 (T-5th)	n/a
1992–93	Charlene Curtis	8–19	3–11 (7th)	n/a
1993–94	Charlene Curtis	7–21	2–14 9th	n/a
1994–95	Charlene Curtis	2–25	0–16 9th	n/a
1995–96	Kristen Foley	7–21	3–13 (T-5th)	n/a
1996–97	Kristen Foley	10–18	4–12 (T-4th)	n/a
1997–98	Kristen Foley	10–17	3–13 (T-5th)	n/a
1998–99	Kristen Foley	8–19	4–12 (T-4th)	n/a
1999-00	Kristen Foley	10–18	5–11 T-(T-3rd)	n/a
2000–01	Dawn Staley	19–11	11–5 (3rd)	WNIT appearance
2001–02	Dawn Staley	20–11	12–4 T-(1st)	NCAA Tournament; Atlantic-10 champions Regular season co-champions
2002–03	Dawn Staley	14–15	9–7 (2nd)	n/a
2003–04	Dawn Staley	21–10	14–2 (1st)	NCAA Tournament; A-10 champions Regular season champions
2004–05	Dawn Staley	28–4	16–0 (1st)	NCAA second round A-10 champions Regular season champions
2005–06	Dawn Staley	24–8	12–4 (3rd)	NCAA Tournament; A-10 champions
2006–07	Dawn Staley	25–8	13–1 (2nd)	NCAA second round
2007–08	Dawn Staley	21–13	12–2 (T-1st)	NCAA Tournament; A-10 regular season co-champions
2008–09	Tonya Cardoza	21–10	11–3 (T-2nd)	NCAA Tournament
2009–10	Tonya Cardoza	25 9	11–3 (T-2nd)	NCAA second round
2010–11	Tonya Cardoza	24–9	13–1 (2nd)	NCAA second round
2011–12	Tonya Cardoza	23–10	13–1 (2nd)	n/a
2012–13	Tonya Cardoza	14–18	5–9	n/a
2013–14	Tonya Cardoza	14–16	8–10 (T-5th)	n/a
2014–15	Tonya Cardoza	20–17	12–6 (4th)	WNIT Final Four
2015–16	Tonya Cardoza	23–12	13–5 (3rd)	WNIT Elite Eight
2016–17	Tonya Cardoza	24–8	13–3 (2nd)	NCAA first round
2017–18	Tonya Cardoza	12–19	3–13 (T-11th)	n/a
2018–19	Tonya Cardoza	11–19	7–9 (T–5th)	
2019–20	Tonya Cardoza	16–15	7–9 (T–6th)	
2020–21	Tonya Cardoza	11–11	11–7 (5th)	
2021–22	Tonya Cardoza	13–15	8–8 (4th)	
2022–23	Diane Richardson	11–18	6–10 (T–8th)	
2023–24	Diane Richardson	20–12	13–5 (T–1st)	Regular season co-champions
2024–25	Diane Richardson	20–11	13–5 (4th)	
2025–26	Diane Richardson	15–17	8–10 (T–7th)	

== NCAA tournament results ==
Temple has appeared in the NCAA Division I women's basketball tournament ten times. They have a record of 4–10.

Year	Seed	Round	Opponent	Result
1989	#8	First round Second round	#9 Holy Cross #1 Auburn	W 90–80; L 54–88
2002	#14	First round	#3 Iowa State	L 57–72
2004	#11	First round	#6 TCU	L 57–70
2006	#6	First round	#11 Hartford	L 58–64
2007	#8	First round Second round	#9 Nebraska #1 Duke	W 64–61; L 52–62
2008	#11	First round	#6 Arizona State	L 54–61
2009	#9	First round	#8 Florida	L 57–70
2010	#8	First round Second round	#9 James Madison #1 Connecticut	W 65–53; L 36–90
2011	#10	First round Second round	#7 Arizona State #2 Notre Dame	W 63–45; L 64–77
2017	#7	First round	#10 Oregon	L 70–71
