= Brian Ehlers =

American basketball player (born 1978)

Personal information
- Born: January 26, 1978 (age 48)
- Listed height: 6 ft 4 in (1.93 m)
- Listed weight: 195 lb (88 kg)

Career information
- High school: Bay Shore (Bay Shore, New York)
- College: Lafayette (1996–2000)
- NBA draft: 2000: undrafted
- Playing career: 2000–2002

Career history
- 2000: Long Island Surf
- 2000–2001: Newcastle Eagles
- 2001–2002: MAFC

Career highlights
- 2× Patriot League Player of the Year (1999, 2000); 2× First-team All-Patriot League (1999, 2000); Second-team All-Patriot League (1998); Patriot League All-Rookie Team (1997); Patriot League tournament MVP (1999)

Brian Ehlers (born January 26, 1978) is an American former professional basketball player who is best known for his collegiate career at Lafayette College from 1996–97 to 1999–2000. He then played professionally for two seasons in Europe before retiring from the sport to become a police officer in his hometown of Bay Shore, New York since 2007.

== College ==
Ehlers spent his prep days playing for his hometown's Bay Shore High School, where as a senior he averaged 31.4 points per game and was named Suffolk County Player of the Year. After graduating in 1996, he continued his career at Lafayette. In his four seasons, Ehlers established himself as one of the more decorated players in school and Patriot League history. During his tenure, the Leopards won three regular season conference championships, earned two berths to the NCAA tournament, and compiled many more wins than losses. Ehlers earned Patriot League All-Rookie Team honors in 1996–97. As a sophomore, he averaged 16.3 points per game on a team that featured league player of the year Stefan Ciosici.

In his last three years, Ehlers was chosen to the All-Patriot League team, and as both a junior and senior he was named the Patriot League Player of the Year, joining Colgate's Adonal Foyle as the only players in league history to win multiple player of the year awards to that point. In the 1998 Patriot League Tournament championship game, Ehlers scored a still-standing record of 31 points. His 1,836 career points were the fourth most in league history as of 2011–12 while being third all-time in Lafayette history.

== Professional and later life ==
After college, Ehlers joined the Long Island Surf of the United States Basketball League (USBL) after being selected in the fifth round of the 2000 USBL draft. He later moved to England to play for the Newcastle Eagles in the British Basketball League (BBL), where he led the BBL in three-point field goal percentage and free throw percentage during the 2000–01 season. He helped Newcastle reach the final of the BBL Trophy. For the 2001–02 season, he played in Hungary for MAFC, where he averaged 20 points per game.

Eventually Ehlers returned home and became a police officer in Bay Shore, New York. He and his wife, Jamie, have two children, Emily and Matthew.
