= Stefan Ciosici =

Romanian basketball player

Personal information
- Born: October 12, 1976 (age 50) Timișoara, Romania
- Listed height: 6 ft 11 in (2.11 m)
- Listed weight: 265 lb (120 kg)

Career information
- High school: Colegiul C.D. Loga (Timișoara, Romania)
- College: Lafayette (1995–2000)
- NBA draft: 2000: undrafted
- Playing career: 2000–2002
- Position: Center

Career history
- 2000–2002: Basket Rimini Crabs

Career highlights
- Patriot League Player of the Year (1998); First-team All-Patriot League (1998); Second-team All-Patriot League (2000); Patriot League tournament MVP (2000); Patriot League Rookie of the Year (1996); Patriot League All-Rookie Team (1996)

Doru Stefan Ciosici (pronounced CHO-sitch; born October 12, 1976) is a Romanian former basketball player known for his collegiate career at Lafayette College between 1995 and 2000, where he was the 1998 Patriot League Player of the Year. He also had a brief professional career in Italy following college. Ciosici became a schoolteacher in Bradenton, Florida. Following a career at SCFCS Collegiate School, Ciosici would step down and immigrate back to Romania for unknown reasons.

== Early life ==
Ciosici grew up in Timișoara, Romania, in a communist environment. Both of his parents were teachers and emphasized the importance of a good education. Basketball was not initially a goal of Ciosici's, but by his sophomore year in high school at Colegiul C.D. Loga he has grown to 6'11". Scouts recommended that he research American universities, and in 1995 he landed at Lafayette College to play for head coach Fran O'Hanlon, having not seen the school nor his coach in person prior to arriving.

== Basketball career ==
=== College ===
Ciosici entered his freshman year in 1995–96 and made an immediate impact, averaging 11.4 points and 7.6 rebounds per game. He was named to the 1996 Patriot League All-Rookie Team and also named the Patriot League Rookie of the Year. In 1996–97, his sophomore season, Ciosici averaged 13.7 points and 7.5 rebounds per game while the Leopards mustered an 11–17 overall record.

As a junior in 1997–98 he increased his averages to 17.0 points and 7.9 rebounds per game, the latter of which led the Patriot League. Lafayette finished a co-regular season champions with Navy, finishing with 10–2 conference records. Lafayette lost to Navy in the Patriot League tournament championship, 85–93. Ciosici was named to the first-team All-Patriot League as well as being honored as the Patriot League Player of the Year, becoming the first player from Lafayette to earn the award.

After his most successful college season, Ciosici missed the entire 1998–99 season after suffering a serious knee injury. He returned in 1999–2000 to be a fifth-year senior by declaring a second academic major. Ciosici and Lafayette had success, seeing him earn a spot on the All-Patriot League second-team after averaging 11.1 points and 6.5 rebounds per game, while the Leopards went 11–1 and finished in second place. They won the conference tournament championship, where Ciosici was named the tournament's MVP, as Lafayette earned the automatic bid into the 2000 NCAA tournament. #15-seed Lafayette lost in the opening round to #2-seed Temple, 47–73, thus ending Ciosici's collegiate career.

=== Professional / international ===
Ciosici went undrafted in the ensuing 2000 NBA draft. He instead played in Italy from 2000 to 2002 for Basket Rimini Crabs where he averaged 5.9 points and 5.5 rebounds per game. In 2003, he played for the Romanian national team during the FIBA EuroBasket qualifying matches, but Romania did not advance. Ciosici's professional and international careers ended after that.

== Post-playing career ==
Ciosici stayed in Italy until 2007, working as a Product Manager for the Menarini Group. Between 2007 and 2013 he worked a number of odd jobs back in the United States before settling in as an educator. He earned a certificate for education/pedagogy from State College of Florida, Manatee–Sarasota in 2012, then a Master's degree in online teaching/learning from the University of South Florida–Manatee–Sarasota in 2016. Ciosici became a mathematics teacher at State College of Florida Collegiate School in Bradenton, Florida from August 2012 until April 2026.

== See also ==
- The Last Amateurs – a book by John Feinstein which chronicles the 1999–2000 Patriot League men's basketball season; Ciosici is a featured player in different chapters
