= Kirby Sports Center =

Sports arena in Easton, Pennsylvania

- Kirby Sports Center
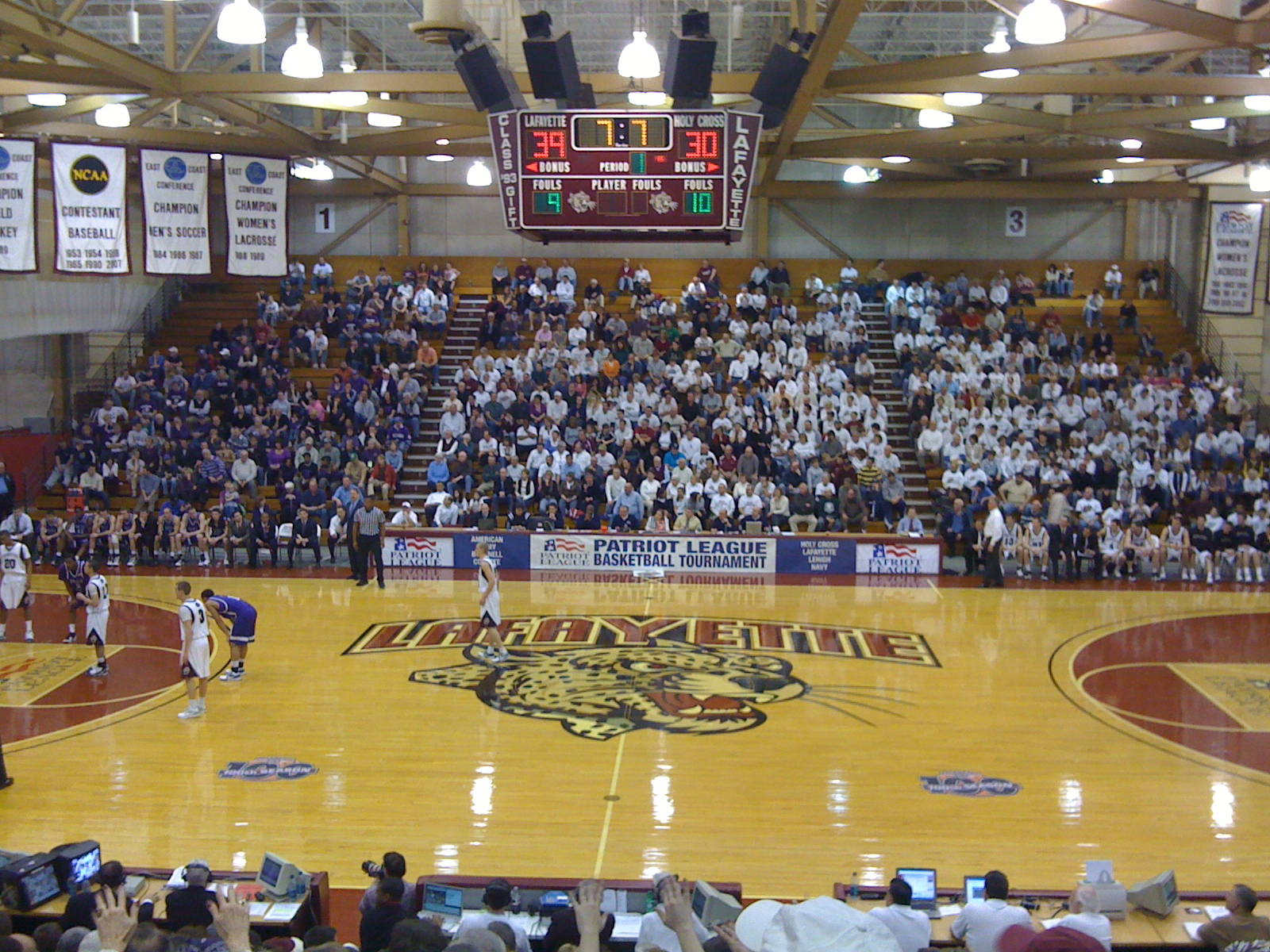
- Kirby Sports Center, March 2010
- Interactive map of Kirby Sports Center
- Former names: Allan P. Kirby Field House (1973–2000)
- Location: 700 Pierce Street; Easton, Pennsylvania, 18042, U.S.
- Coordinates: 40.7019°N 75.2107°W
- Owner: Lafayette College
- Operator: Lafayette College
- Capacity: 2,453 (expandable
- Surface: Hardwood

Construction
- Opened: December 1, 1973; June 2, 2000 (renovation)
- Cost: $35 million (renovation)
- Architect: Cannon Design (renovation)

Tenants
- Lafayette Leopards (men's and women's basketball, women's volleyball, men's and women's indoor track, fencing)

Kirby Sports Center is a 2,453-seat multi-purpose arena in Easton, Pennsylvania. It was built in 1973 and is home to the Lafayette College Leopards basketball team. It hosted the 2000 Patriot League men's basketball tournament and has been the site of two Patriot League tournament finals, an Ivy League playoff game and numerous high school tournament contests.

The arena in Kirby Sports Center underwent a $1.7 million renovation that was completed for the start of the 2013–14 academic year. Three major changes included in the project that was overseen by Clough, Harbor and Associates: new seating, the addition of a video scoreboard and an LED scorer's table.

Dedicated on June 2, 2000, the $35 million Allan P. Kirby Sports Center includes a new, 110,000-square-foot (10,000 m^{2}) intramural and recreational sports facility attached to the previously existing Kirby Field House.

The new portion of the center, featuring a distinctive atrium overlooking Fisher Stadium, includes the Kamine Gymnasium, which includes three 50-by-84-foot (15 by 26 m) courts for basketball, floor hockey, and other sports and an elevated 1/10-mile (0.16 km) jogging track. The Buck Courts include six courts for racquet sports, two for squash and four that can be configured for squash or racquetball. A 6,600-square-foot (610 m^{2}) fitness center and weight room includes a full strength-training circuit, spacious free-weight area, and more than 30 cardiovascular machines. There is also a 35-foot (11 m) climbing wall, an aerobics area, and several offices.

Built in 1973, the original field house, which contains Ruef Natatorium, is home to several varsity sports teams. It replaced Alumni Gymnasium, an Art Deco building located to the southeast of Fisher Field built in 1924. It has been enhanced by the renovations dedicated in 2000 to include a new sports medicine area and a new equipment room and renovated locker rooms and administrative offices. The lobby and Athletic Hall of Fame exhibitry have been modernized.

Major support for the sports center was provided by the F.M. Kirby Foundation, which made a $32.5 million gift to Lafayette, the largest gift ever received by a college, university, or other non-profit organization in the Lehigh Valley. The Kirby Foundation is the family foundation of the Fred Morgan Kirby family, which has been prominent in the life of Lafayette for nearly a century. Seven family members are alumni, four have served as trustees, and three received honorary doctorates from Lafayette.

The current director of recreation services for the Kirby Sports Center is Jodie Frey, who is also the associate dean of students.

The venue should not be confused with the F.M. Kirby Center, an arts and entertainment complex in Wilkes-Barre.

== See also ==
- List of NCAA Division I basketball arenas
