= Todd Morgan (politician) =

American politician (born 1956)

Todd B. Morgan
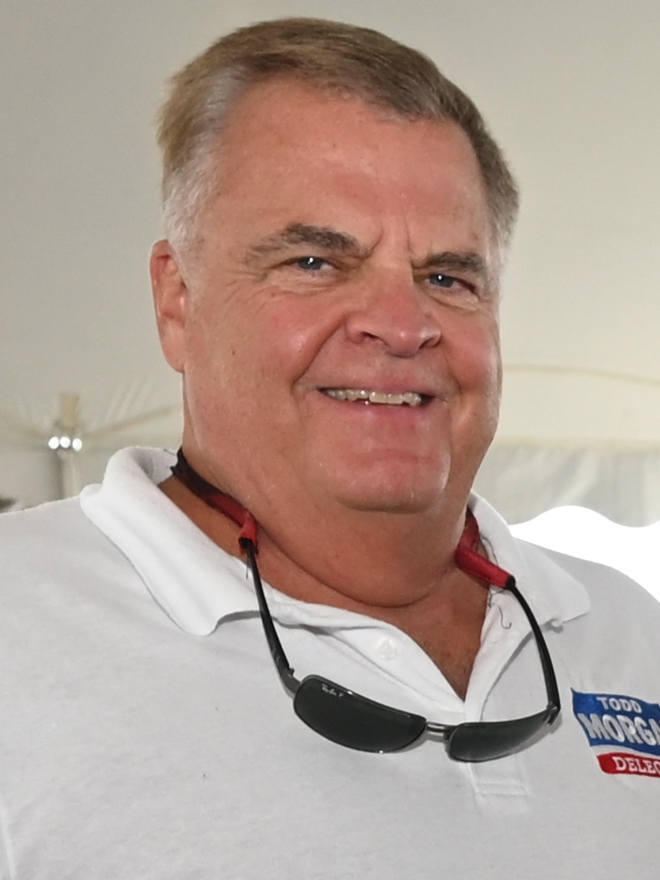
- Morgan in 2022

Member of the Maryland House of Delegates from the 29C district
- Incumbent
- Assumed office January 11, 2023
- Preceded by: Jerry Clark

Vice President of the St. Mary's County Board of Commissioners
- In office January 2, 2014 – December 9, 2014
- Preceded by: Lawrence D. Jarboe
- Succeeded by: Thomas H. Jarboe

Member of the St. Mary's County Board of Commissioners, District 4
- In office December 6, 2010 – December 5, 2022
- Preceded by: Daniel H. Raley
- Succeeded by: Scott R. Ostrow

Personal details
- Born: January 1, 1956 (age 70) Pittsburgh, Pennsylvania, U.S.
- Party: Republican
- Spouse: Maria (died 2012)
- Children: 3
- Education: Susquehanna University (BBA); Marshall University (MBA)
- Occupation: Defense contractor
- Website: Campaign website

Todd B. Morgan (born January 1, 1956) is an American politician. He is a member of the Maryland House of Delegates for District 29C in St. Mary's County, Maryland. He was previously a member of the St. Mary's County Board of Commissioners from 2010 to 2022 and served as its vice president in 2014.

== Background ==
Morgan graduated from Susquehanna University in Selinsgrove, Pennsylvania with a Bachelor of Business Administration. He later attended Marshall University in Huntington, West Virginia, where he earned his Master of Business Administration degree. Morgan moved to St. Mary's County in 1979 following graduation.

Morgan began his career by working at federal U.S. Department of Defense contractor Science Applications International Corporation in finance and acquisitions. He also previously taught classes for 20 years at various local colleges, including College of Southern Maryland, St. Mary's College of Maryland, and the University of Maryland Global Campus, and as an adjunct assistant professor at Embry-Riddle University. From 2004 to 2010, he was the president of the Southern Maryland Navy Alliance.

In 2010, Morgan was elected to the St. Mary's County Board of Commissioners, and was re-elected in 2014 and 2018. He served as the board's vice president in 2014.

In August 2016, Morgan applied to fill a vacancy in the Maryland House of Delegates left by the appointment of state delegate Tony O'Donnell to the Maryland Public Service Commission. The St. Mary's County Republican Central Committee included Morgan on its list of three potential nominees, but Governor Larry Hogan appointed former Calvert County commissioner Jerry Clark to the seat in September.

In February 2022, Morgan filed to run for the Maryland House of Delegates in District 29C, seeking to succeed retiring state delegate Jerry Clark. He defeated Maryland Adjutant General Timothy Gowen in the Republican primary on July 19, receiving 64.8 percent of the vote.

Morgan endorsed former Maryland Secretary of Commerce Kelly Schulz for governor in 2022.

== In the legislature ==
Morgan was sworn into the Maryland House of Delegates on January 11, 2023. He is a member of the House Environment and Transportation Committee.

== Political positions ==
Morgan self-identifies as a fiscal conservative.

=== Elections ===
Morgan opposed a bill introduced by state delegate Brian M. Crosby that would require elections for county commissioners to only be decided by voters within the districts in which the candidate is running rather than at-large, voting in 2021 to ask the Maryland General Assembly for a referendum on the bill and for another referendum on eliminating districts altogether.

=== Guns ===
In May 2020, Morgan voted to designate St. Mary's County as a Second Amendment sanctuary area.

=== Marijuana ===
In March 2022, Morgan introduced a resolution that called on the St. Mary's County planning commission to amend the zoning ordinance to allow review of future medical marijuana facilities in the county. The resolution was unanimously approved by the Board of Commissioners. In August, he voted for an ordinance that would restrict medical marijuana growing and processing operations to certain zoning areas.

=== Social issues ===
In June 2019, Morgan described a Drag Queen Story Hour event held at the St. Mary's County Library as "going after and targeting the kids for sexuality".

=== Taxes ===
In November 2022, Morgan said he supported reductions in or eliminating the inheritance tax. He also supports deregulation and requiring the state to providing additional funding to counties to pay for "unfunded mandates from Annapolis".

During the 2026 legislative session and amid the 2026 Iran war, Morgan introduced an amendment to the state budget that would impose a 30-day holiday gas tax holiday. The amendment was rejected by the House of Delegates.

== Personal life ==
Morgan has three children. His wife, Maria, died in November 2012 following a long battle with injuries sustained in a traffic accident in July 2011. Morgan attends the Church of the Ascension in Lexington Park, Maryland.

== Electoral history ==
St. Mary's Board of Education at-large primary election, 2000
Candidate	Votes	%
Cathy Allen	4,417	43.8
Todd B. Morgan	3,211	31.8
Elizabeth Reeves	2,457	24.4

St. Mary's Board of Education at-large election, 2000
Candidate	Votes	%
Cathy Allen	15,633	62.9
Todd B. Morgan	9,236	37.1

St. Mary's County Commissioner District 4 Republican primary election, 2010
Party	Candidate	Votes	%
Republican	Todd B. Morgan	5,384	100.0

St. Mary's County Commissioner District 4 election, 2010
Party	Candidate	Votes	%
Republican	Todd B. Morgan	18,530	59.9
Democratic	Mary M. Washington	12,405	40.1
Write-in		9	0.0

St. Mary's County Commissioner District 4 Republican primary election, 2014
Party	Candidate	Votes	%
Republican	Todd B. Morgan	4,231	100.0

St. Mary's County Commissioner District 4 election, 2014
Party	Candidate	Votes	%
Republican	Todd B. Morgan	26,705	98.4
Write-in		444	1.6

St. Mary's County Commissioner District 4 Republican primary election, 2018
Party	Candidate	Votes	%
Republican	Todd B. Morgan	4,804	100.0

St. Mary's County Commissioner District 4 election, 2018
Party	Candidate	Votes	%
Republican	Todd B. Morgan	31,119	95.9
Write-in		1,345	4.1

Maryland House of Delegates District 29C Republican primary election, 2022
Party	Candidate	Votes	%
Republican	Todd B. Morgan	3,249	64.8
Republican	Timothy E. Gowen	1,766	35.2

Maryland House of Delegates District 29C election, 2022
Party	Candidate	Votes	%
Republican	Todd B. Morgan	10,604	61.66
Democratic	Bill Bates	6,561	38.15
Write-in		32	0.19
