= Adrianne Mathis =

American politician (born 1972)

- Mathis in 2026

Member-elect of the Maryland House of Delegates from the 29B district
- Assuming office January 13, 2027
- Succeeding: Brian M. Crosby

Personal details
- Born: Adrianne Michelle Mathis; 1972 (age 53–54) Naval Air Station Patuxent River, Maryland, U.S.
- Party: Democratic
- Children: 3
- Education: Bowie State University; College of Notre Dame of Maryland

Adrianne Michelle Mathis (born 1972) is an American politician and retired educator who is a member-elect of the Maryland House of Delegates from District 29B. She is a member of the Democratic Party.

== Early life and education ==
Mathis was born in 1972 on Patuxent River Naval Air Station in St. Mary's County, Maryland, to a Catholic and Baptist family. Her father, Walter Lee Mathis Jr., was a U.S. Navy veteran who retired as a petty officer first class in 1983. Mathis graduated from Leonardtown High School, earned her bachelor's degree from Bowie State University, and a master's degree from the College of Notre Dame of Maryland.

== Career ==
Mathis taught in Calvert County, Maryland, for six years, later returning to St. Mary's County to teach at Leonardtown Middle School and the Chesapeake Public Charter School before becoming the assistant principal at Spring Middle High School. In August 2019, she was named the coordinator of equity assurance for St. Mary's County Public Schools. From 2022 to 2023, she served as the assistant principal of Great Mills High School.

Mathis is a member of the St. Mary's County NAACP.

== Maryland House of Delegates ==
In September 2025, Mathis announced that she would run for the Maryland House of Delegates in District 29B. She won the Democratic primary on June 23, 2026, and defeated Republican nominee BJ Hall in the general election. She is the first African-American person elected to the Maryland General Assembly from St. Mary's County. Mathis was assigned to the Health Committee.

== Political positions ==
Mathis supports strengthening schools through equity-focused investments through the Blueprint for Maryland's Future. She also supports tax credits for new hires and property improvements in innovation districts, expanding subsidies for affordable housing, increasing environmental protections to reduce pollution in the Patuxent River, and the widening of Maryland Route 235.

== Personal life ==
Mathis is a mother of twin daughters and a son.
