= Balanoff =

Balanoff is a surname. Notable people with the surname include:

- Clem Balanoff (born 1953), American politician, son of Miriam
- Miriam Balanoff (1926–2017), American judge and politician
- Tom Balanoff, American labor union leader

== See also ==
- Andrey Balanov
