= Anthony O'Donnell =

Anthony O'Donnell may refer to:

- Anthony O'Donnell (actor), Welsh actor
- Tony O'Donnell (politician) (born 1961), American politician in the Maryland House of Delegates
