= Maryland House of Delegates District 29B =

American legislative district

Maryland's legislative district 29B
- Represents part of St. Mary's County
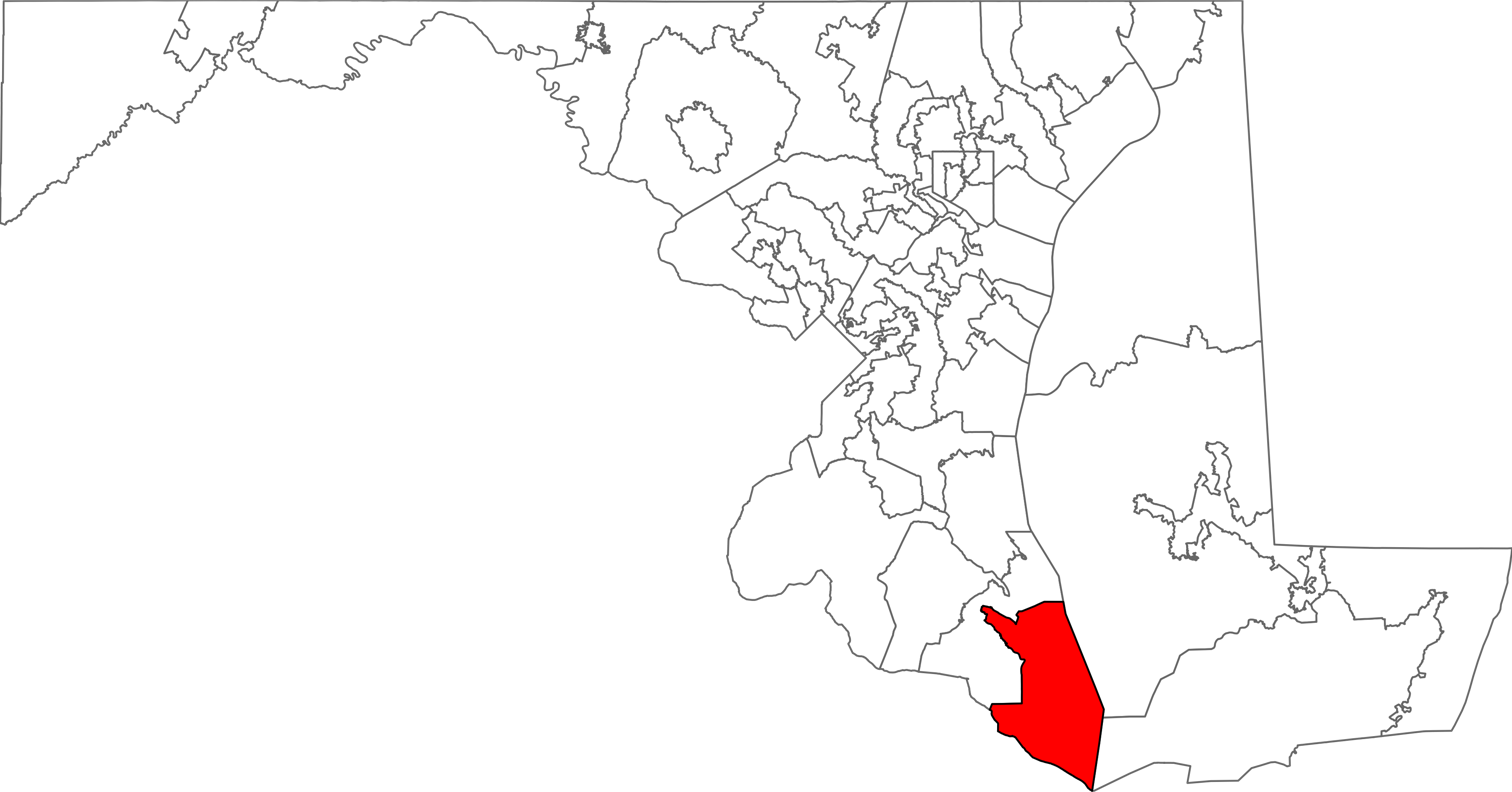
- Delegate(s): Brian M. Crosby (D)
- Registration: 43.6% Democratic; 32.5% Republican; 22.0% unaffiliated
- Demographics: 57.6% White; 24.3% Black/African American; 0.4% Native American; 4.2% Asian; 0.1% Hawaiian/Pacific Islander; 3.4% Other race; 9.9% Two or more races; 8.8% Hispanic
- Population (2020): 44,620
- Voting-age population: 34,184
- Registered voters: 26,285

Maryland House of Delegates District 29B is one of the 71 districts that compose the Maryland House of Delegates. Along with subdistricts 29A and 29C, it makes up the 29th district of the Maryland Senate. District 29B includes part of St. Mary's County, and is represented by one delegate.

== Demographic characteristics ==
As of the 2020 United States census, the district had a population of 44,620, of whom 34,184 (76.6%) were of voting age. The racial makeup of the district was 25,721 (57.6%) White, 10,841 (24.3%) African American, 193 (0.4%) Native American, 1,878 (4.2%) Asian, 32 (0.1%) Pacific Islander, 1,502 (3.4%) from some other race, and 4,429 (9.9%) from two or more races. Hispanic or Latino of any race were 3,936 (8.8%) of the population.

The district had 26,285 registered voters as of October 17, 2020, of whom 5,785 (22.0%) were registered as unaffiliated, 8,554 (32.5%) were registered as Republicans, 11,468 (43.6%) were registered as Democrats, and 265 (1.0%) were registered to other parties.

== Past Election Results ==
=== 1990 ===
Name	Party	Votes	Percent	Outcome
J. Ernest Bell II	Democratic	5,956	70.0%	Won
O'Donnell	Republican	2,590	30.0%	Lost

=== 1994 ===
Name	Party	Votes	Percent	Outcome
John F. Slade III	Democratic	5,228	63.0%	Won
Donald Lee O'Neal	Republican	3,083	37.0%	Lost

=== 1998 ===
Name	Party	Votes	Percent	Outcome
John F. Slade III	Democratic	6,327	66.0%	Won
Donald Lee O'Neal	Republican	3,316	34.0%	Lost

=== 2002 ===
Name	Party	Votes	Percent	Outcome
John L. Bohanan Jr.	Democratic	6,340	58.8%	Won
Joseph L. Dick	Republican	4,434	41.2%	Lost
Other Write-Ins		2	0.0%	

=== 2006 ===
Name	Party	Votes	Percent	Outcome
John L. Bohanan Jr.	Democratic	8,077	64.0%	Won
Noel Temple Wood	Republican	4,528	35.9%	Lost
Other Write-Ins		8	0.1%	

=== 2010 ===
Name	Party	Votes	Percent	Outcome
John L. Bohanan Jr.	Democratic	7,654	52.4%	Won
Erik Anderson	Republican	6,946	47.5%	Lost
Other Write-Ins		11	0.1%	

=== 2014 ===
Name	Party	Votes	Percent	Outcome
Deb Rey	Republican	5,334	50.3%	Won
John L. Bohanan Jr.	Democratic	5,258	49.6%	Lost
Other Write-Ins		10	0.1%	

=== 2018 ===
Name	Party	Votes	Percent	Outcome
Brian M. Crosby	Democratic	7,351	53.4%	Won
Deb Rey	Republican	6,409	46.5%	Lost
Other Write-Ins		16	0.1%	

== List of delegates ==
Delegate	Party	Years	Electoral history	Notes
J. Ernest Bell II	Democratic	1983–1994	Elected in 1990	
John F. Slade III	Democratic	1995–2002	Elected in 1994 and 1998	
John L. Bohanan Jr.	Democratic	2003–2014	Elected in 2002, 2006 and 2010. Lost election in 2014.	
Deb Rey	Republican	2015–2018	Elected in 2014. Lost election in 2018.	
Brian M. Crosby	Democratic	2019–present	Elected in 2018.	
