= John F. Slade III =

American politician (born 1943)

Associated Judge, 4th District Court
- Incumbent
- Assumed office October 22, 1999

Member of the Maryland House of Delegates from the 29B district
- In office 1995–2002
- Preceded by: J. Ernest Bell II
- Succeeded by: John L. Bohanan, Jr.

Member of the Maryland House of Delegates from the 29C district
- In office 1983–1994
- Preceded by: district established
- Succeeded by: Tony O'Donnell

Personal details
- Born: August 5, 1943 (age 83) Leonardtown, Maryland
- Party: Democratic
- Spouse: Dorothy Rose Martin
- Children: 3
- Education: St. Mary's College of Maryland; University of Maryland; University of Baltimore School of Law

John F. Slade III (born August 5, 1943) is an Associate Judge with the 4th District Court of Maryland. Slade served in the Maryland House of Delegates from 1983 to 2003. He represented District 29C, which represented part of St. Mary's County, from 1983 to 1994 and represented District 29B, which represented parts of Calvert County and St. Mary's County, from 1995 to 2002.

== Early life ==
Slade went to Great Mills High School in Great Mills, Maryland. He went to St. Mary's College of Maryland, where he received his associate degree in 1964. He then attended the University of Maryland, getting his bachelor's degree in Economics in 1967. Two years later, he graduated from the University of Baltimore School of Law and was admitted to the Maryland Bar in 1970.

== Personal life ==
Slade is married to Dorothy Rose Martin Slade and has children.

== Career ==
After receiving his law degree, Slade was a public defender in St. Mary's County until 1974, when he became an Assistant State's Attorney, also for St. Mary's County. In 1986, he advanced to District Public Defender, District 4 for Calvert, Charles, and St. Mary's Counties.

In 1982, he was elected to the Maryland House of Delegates in District 29C. He served in District 29C until 1994. He then was elected to District 29B in 1994 and served from 1995 to 2002. While a member of the House of Delegates, he was the chair of the Joint Audit Committee from 1995 until 1997 and chair of the St. Mary's County Delegation from 1995 until 1999. He then became a member of the District Court.

Over his career, Judge Slade has won several awards including the Cross Bottany Award, the St. Mary's College of Maryland Alumni Award, the Outstanding Young Men of America Award and the Delegate of the Year, as awarded by the Maryland Association of Psychosocial Services. Finally, he is a foundation member of the Zeta Chapter of Phi Beta Kappa at St. Mary's College.

== Election results ==
- 1986 Race for Maryland House of Delegates – District 29C

Voters to choose one:

Name	Votes	Percent	Outcome
John F. Slade III, Dem.	3,696	100%	Won
Unopposed			

- 1990 Race for Maryland House of Delegates – District 29C

Voters to choose one:

Name	Votes	Percent	Outcome
John F. Slade III, Dem.	4,296	100%	Won
Unopposed			

- 1994 Race for Maryland House of Delegates – District 29B

Voters to choose one:

Name	Votes	Percent	Outcome
John F. Slade III, Dem.	5,228	63%	Won
Donald Lee O'Neal, Rep.	3,083	37%	Lost

- 1998 Race for Maryland House of Delegates – District 29B

Voters to choose one:

Name	Votes	Percent	Outcome
John F. Slade III, Dem.	6,327	66%	Won
Donald Lee O'Neal, Rep.	3,316	34%	Lost
