= Schedule of the 2008 Democratic National Convention =

American political convention schedule

The following is a schedule of the 2008 Democratic National Convention that was held from August 25 to August 27 at Pepsi Center and on August 28 at INVESCO Field at Mile High in Denver, Colorado.

== Sunday, August 24 ==
=== Interfaith gathering ===
A Democratic National Convention Interfaith Gathering was held at "2:00 pm MT, at the Wells Fargo Theater, inside the Colorado Convention Center." It was the first time the DNC has hosted such an event and was "the first official event for the 2008 Convention [...] The event [was] free and open to the public, but tickets [were] required."

The event was led by:

- Rabbi Tsvi Weinreb, executive vice president of the Union of Orthodox Jewish Congregations of America
- Bishop Charles E. Blake, presiding prelate of the Church of God in Christ
- Ingrid Mattson, president of the Islamic Society of North America
- Roman Catholic nun Helen Prejean, who was featured in the award-winning movie Dead Man Walking

Additional clergy included:

- Rabbi Marc Schneier, founding director of the Jewish-Muslim Foundation for Ethnic Understanding
- Rabbi Amy Schwartzman, a Reform rabbi from Virginia.

Local clergy included:

- Imam Abdur-Rahim Ali of the Northeast Denver Islamic Center
- Rabbi Steven Foster from Congregation Emmanuel
- Human rights leader Reverend Lucia Guzman
- Kathryn Ida of the Buddhist Association at University of Colorado.

The Secular Coalition for America has argued that while the event was "designed to showcase the 'diversity' and 'shared values' of the party and achieve a 'spirit of unity,' it would, in fact, marginalize those Democrats who do not practice religion." The Coalition wrote to chief executive officer of the Democratic National Convention Committee, the Rev. Leah Daughtry, stating that it "expressed the Coalition's willingness to discuss ways to make the convention more inclusive."

== Monday, August 25 ==
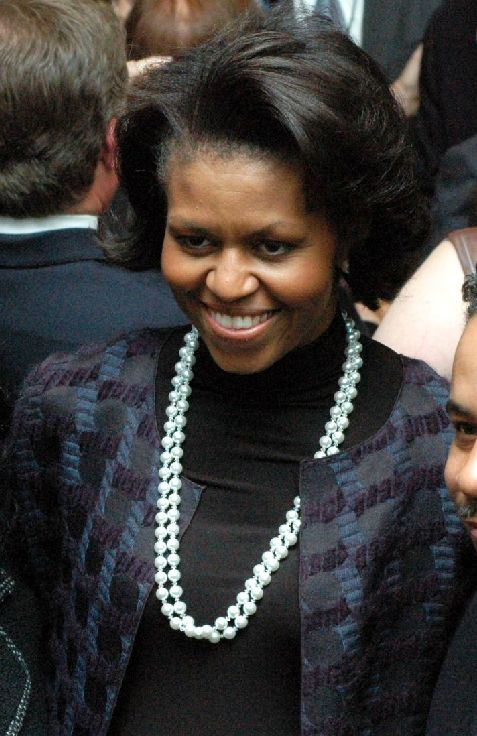
Michelle Obama

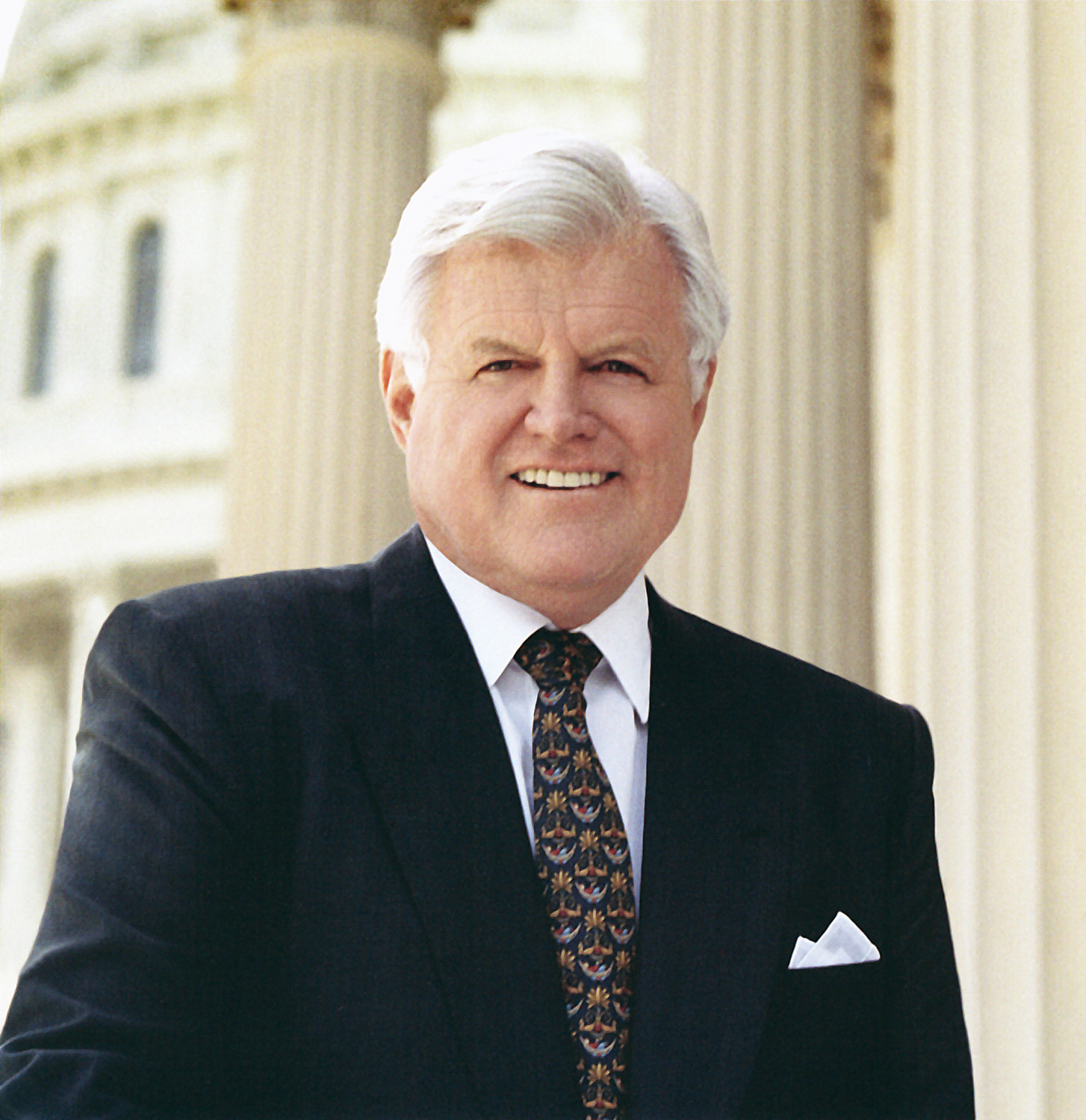
Ted Kennedy

The theme for the day was "One Nation", with Michelle Obama as the "headline prime-time speaker." She was introduced by her brother, Craig Robinson. The Work to Come: A Tribute to Senator Edward Kennedy, directed and produced by Mark Herzog and Chris Cowen in association with Ken Burns, was introduced by Kennedy's niece, Caroline Kennedy. Senator Kennedy was not expected to attend the convention due to his illness, but nevertheless made a surprise appearance and speech in the evening. A video about former President Jimmy Carter's humanitarian work was also shown, followed by a brief appearance by the president and former president himself, accompanied by former First Lady Rosalynn Carter.

The Platform was adopted by voice vote with no real debate.

The speakers were scheduled to include:

=== Principal speakers ===
- Caroline Bouvier Kennedy, author, attorney, and former First Daughter
- Edward M. Kennedy, United States Senator from Massachusetts
- Michelle Obama, attorney, public servant, and executive; wife of Barack Obama
- Nancy Pelosi, Speaker of the United States House of Representatives, congresswoman, Convention Chair

=== Featured speakers ===
- Joe Baca, United States Representative from California
- Tom Balanoff, representative of the Illinois Service Employees International Union
- Sherrod Brown, United States Senator from Ohio
- Howard Dean, chair of the Democratic National Committee
- Miguel del Valle, Chicago City Clerk
- Manny Diaz, Mayor of Miami
- Jesse Jackson, Jr., United States Representative from Illinois
- Alexi Giannoulias, Illinois State Treasurer
- Tom Harkin, United States Senator from Iowa
- John Hickenlooper, Mayor of Denver
- Dan Hynes, State Comptroller of Illinois
- Emil Jones, Jr., State Senator from Illinois
- Nancy Keenan, President of NARAL Pro-Choice America
- Jerry Kellman, mentor and friend of Barack Obama
- Amy Klobuchar, United States Senator from Minnesota
- Jim Leach, Republican former United States Representative from Iowa
- Lisa Madigan, Attorney General of Illinois
- Patricia Madrid, Attorney General of New Mexico
- Doris Matsui, United States Representative from California and Convention Parliamentarian
- Claire McCaskill, United States Senator from Missouri
- Judith McHale, business executive and co-chair of the Convention Platform Committee
- Grace Napolitano, United States Representative from California
- Margie Perez, musician
- Silvestre Reyes, United States Representative from Texas
- Candi Schmieder, delegate chair of the Iowa County Convention
- Kathleen Sebelius, Governor of Kansas
- Maya Soetoro-Ng, half-sister of Barack Obama
- Andrew Tobias, Democratic Party Treasurer
- Reg Weaver, President of the National Education Association
- Randi Weingarten, President of the American Federation of Teachers

== Tuesday, August 26 ==
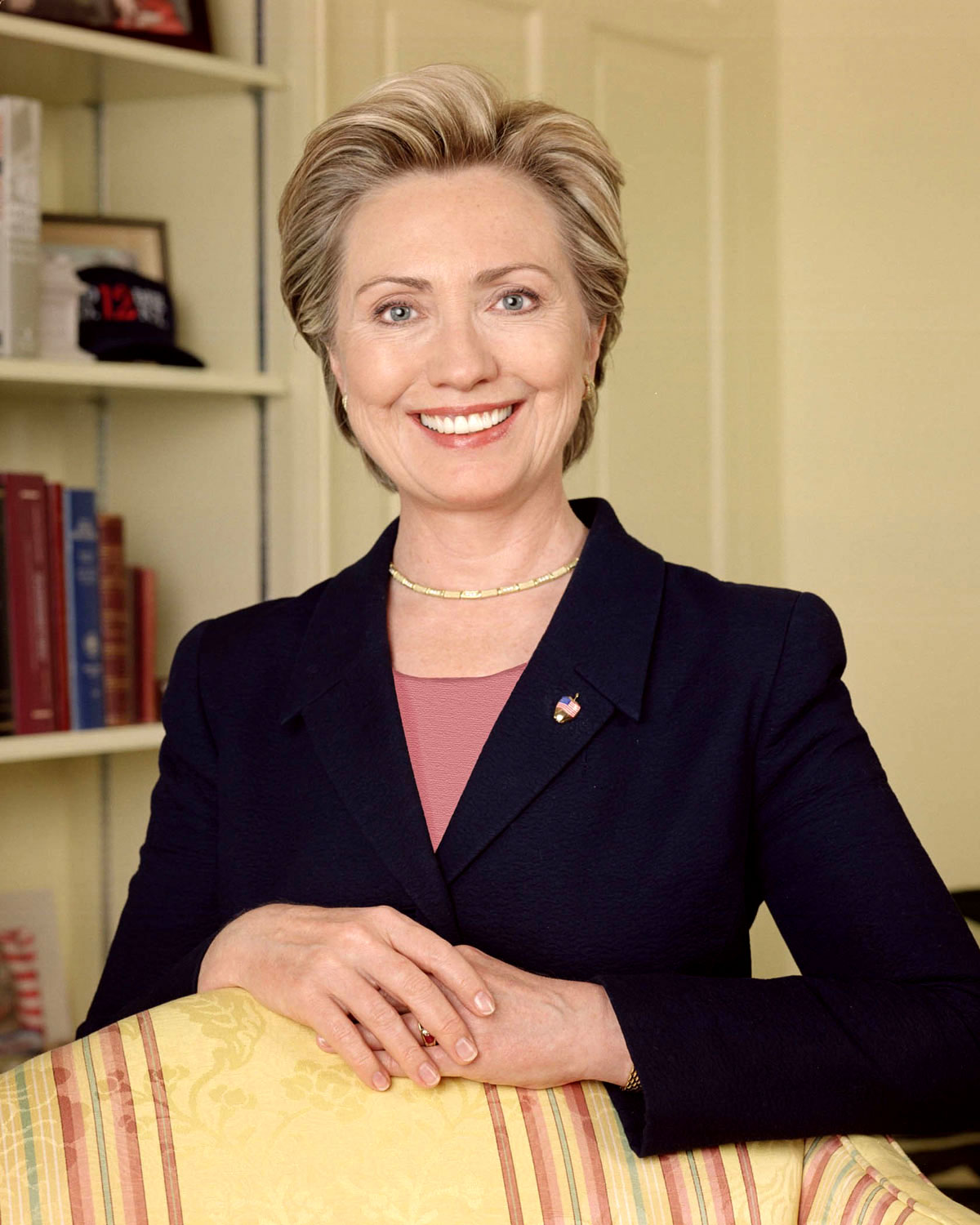
Hillary Clinton

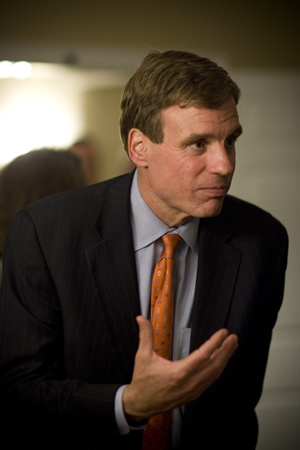
Mark Warner

The theme for the day was "Renewing America's Promise." Senator Hillary Clinton was the headline prime-time speaker and former Virginia Governor Mark Warner delivered the keynote address on Tuesday night.

=== Principal speakers ===
- Hillary Clinton, United States Senator from New York, former congressional and Carter administration lawyer, and former First Lady of the United States; runner-up for the 2008 Democratic nomination
- Mark Warner, keynote speaker, former Virginia governor and candidate for United States Senate

=== Featured speakers ===
The speakers included:

- Tammy Baldwin, United States Representative from Wisconsin
- Xavier Becerra, United States Representative from California
- Barbara Boxer, United States Senator from California
- Anna Burger, chair of the Change to Win Federation
- Maria Cantwell, United States Senator from Washington
- Bob Casey, Jr., United States Senator from Pennsylvania
- John Chiang, State Controller of California
- John Conyers, United States Representative from Michigan
- Chet Culver, Governor of Iowa
- Jim Doyle, Governor of Wisconsin
- Rahm Emanuel, United States House of Representatives Democratic Caucus Chair
- David Gipp, President of United Tribes Technical College, Bismarck, North Dakota
- Jennifer Granholm, Governor of Michigan
- Mike Honda, United States Representative from California
- Eleanor Holmes Norton, United States Delegate from the District of Columbia
- Steny Hoyer, United States Representative from Maryland, House Majority Leader
- Carolyn Kilpatrick, United States Representative from Michigan
- Amy Klobuchar, United States Senator from Minnesota
- Dennis Kucinich, United States Representative from Ohio
- Mary Landrieu, United States Senator from Louisiana
- Patrick Leahy, United States Senator from Vermont
- Lilly Ledbetter, pay equity pioneer
- Blanche Lincoln, United States Senator from Arkansas
- Joe Manchin, Governor of West Virginia and chair of the Democratic Governors’ Association
- Claire McCaskill, United States Senator from Missouri
- Barbara Mikulski, United States Senator from Maryland
- Nancy Floyd, founder of Nth Power
- Janet Napolitano, Governor of Arizona
- Deval Patrick, Governor of Massachusetts
- Charles Rangel, United States Representative from New York
- Ed Rendell, Governor of Pennsylvania
- Cecile Richards, President of Planned Parenthood of America
- David Paterson, Governor of New York
- Federico Peña, former United States Secretary of Energy and United States Secretary of Transportation
- Linda Sánchez, United States Representative from California
- Brian Schweitzer, Governor of Montana
- Kathleen Sebelius, Governor of Kansas
- Ted Sorensen, author and advisor to President John F. Kennedy
- Debbie Stabenow, United States Senator from Michigan
- Ted Strickland, Governor of Ohio
- John Sweeney, President of the AFL-CIO
- Bennie Thompson, United States Representative from Mississippi
- Chris Van Hollen, chair of the Democratic Congressional Campaign Committee
- Nydia Velázquez, United States Representative from New York
- Jim Whitaker, Republican mayor of Fairbanks, Alaska

== Wednesday, August 27 ==
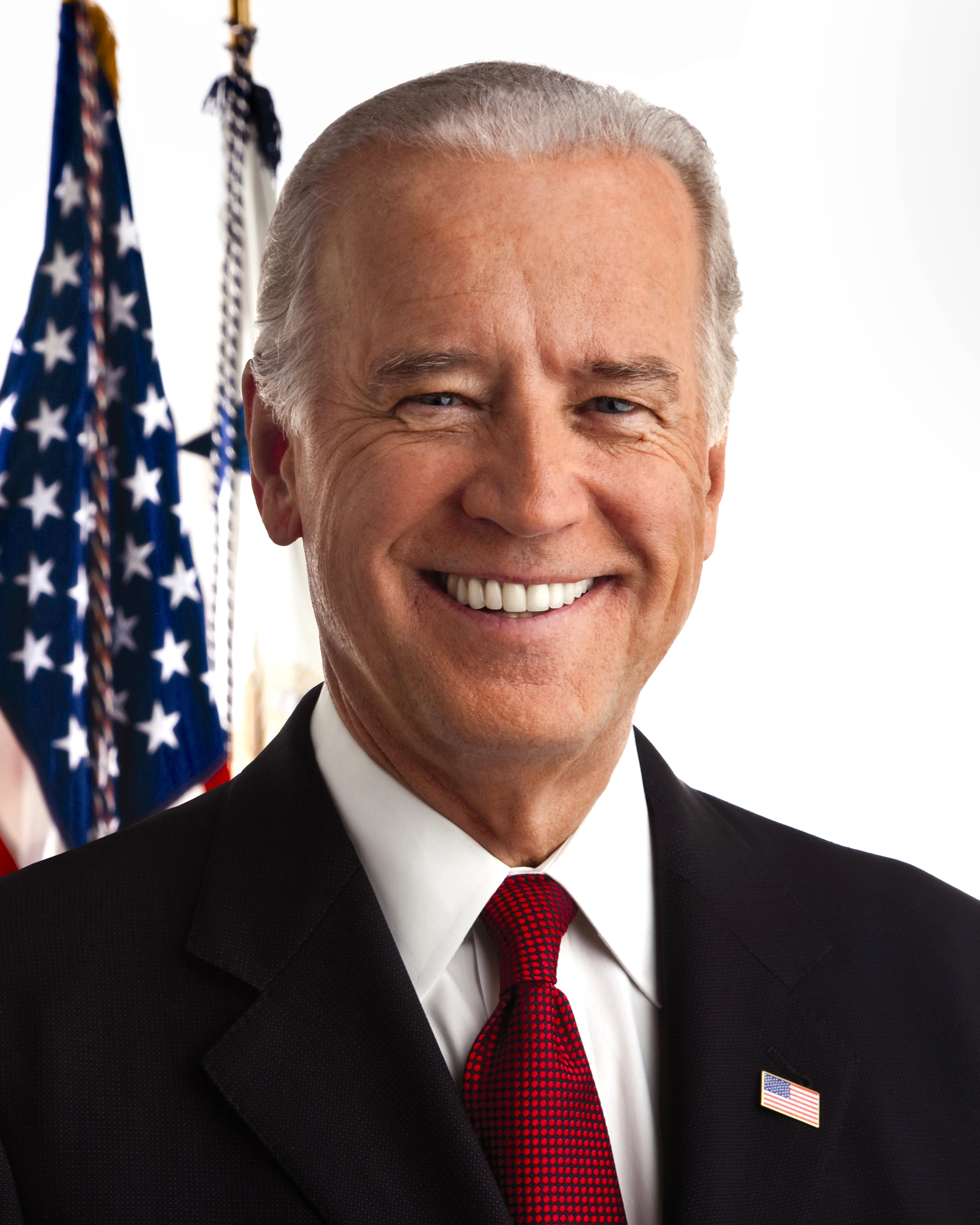
Joe Biden

Bill Clinton

The theme for the day was "Securing America's Future" and featured a speech by Joe Biden, the vice presidential candidate. Iraq War veterans Representative Patrick Murphy (D-PA) and Illinois Veterans' Affairs Department Director Tammy Duckworth offered a tribute to war veterans.

Obama and Biden were both formally chosen to be the Democratic nominees for President and Vice President by acclamation, put forward by former rival Senator Hillary Clinton.

Barack Obama himself made a surprise appearance after Biden's acceptance speech and praised the performances of his colleagues and his wife Michelle. Obama also reminded delegates to attend his acceptance speech the following day.

Sister Catherine Pinkerton delivered the benediction for the night.

=== Principal speakers ===
- Joe Biden, United States Senator from Delaware and 2008 Democratic nominee for Vice President of the United States
- Bill Clinton, 42nd President of the United States

=== Featured speakers ===
The speakers included:

- Madeleine Albright, former United States Secretary of State
- Tom Allen, candidate for United States Senate from Maine
- Evan Bayh, United States Senator from Indiana
- Beau Biden, Attorney General of Delaware and son of Joe Biden
- Lois Capps, United States Representative from California
- Kathy Castor, United States Representative from Florida
- James E. Clyburn, United States House of Representatives Majority Whip
- Elijah Cummings, United States Representative from Maryland
- Richard M. Daley, Mayor of Chicago
- Tom Daschle, former United States Senator from South Dakota
- Artur Davis, United States Representative from Alabama
- Rosa DeLauro, United States Representative from Connecticut
- Manny Diaz, mayor of Miami
- Tammy Duckworth, Iraq War veteran and Director of Illinois Veterans' Affairs
- Chet Edwards, United States Representative from Texas
- John Hutson, Republican, retired rear admiral of the United States Navy and president of the Franklin Pierce Law Center
- Michele S. Jones, first female command sergeant major of the United States Army
- Claudia J. Kennedy, first female three-star general in the United States Army
- John Kerry, United States Senator from Massachusetts and 2004 Democratic presidential nominee
- Nita Lowey, United States Representative from New York
- Jeff Merkley, candidate for United States Senate from Oregon
- Patrick Murphy, United States Representative from Pennsylvania and first Iraq War veteran elected to Congress
- Nancy Pelosi, Speaker of the United States House of Representatives
- Jack Reed, United States Senator from Rhode Island
- Harry Reid, United States Senate Majority Leader
- Jay Rockefeller, United States Senator from West Virginia
- Xiomara Rodriguez, Nevada delegate and retired member of the United States Coast Guard
- Ken Salazar, United States Senator from Colorado
- Joe Sestak, United States Representative from Pennsylvania
- Chuck Schumer, United States Senator from New York
- Jeanne Shaheen, former governor of New Hampshire and candidate for United States Senate
- Louise Slaughter, United States Representative from New York
- Hilda Solis, United States Representative from California
- Tom Udall, United States Representative from New Mexico and candidate for United States Senate
- Debbie Wasserman Schultz, United States Representative from Florida
- Maxine Waters, United States Representative from California
- Robert Wexler, United States Representative from Florida

=== Results of delegate voting ===
Along with presumptive presidential nominee Barack Obama, former opponent Hillary Clinton's name was also placed in nomination for president. The Los Angeles Times noted that this has occurred before: Jerry Brown's name was entered into the roll call after losing to Bill Clinton in 1992; Jesse Jackson and Gary Hart also had their names added after losing to Walter F. Mondale in 1984. In 1980, Senator Ted Kennedy's name was entered into the roll call after losing to Jimmy Carter. In addition, Clinton became only the fourth woman to have her name placed in nomination for president at a major party convention. U.S. Sen. Margaret Chase Smith of Maine was placed in nomination at the 1964 Republican convention, and U.S. Rep. Shirley Chisholm of New York was placed in nomination at the 1972 Democratic convention. In 1976, anti-abortionist Ellen McCormack had her name placed in nomination along with Mo Udall, Jimmy Carter and Jerry Brown.

==== President ====
Democratic National Convention presidential vote, 2008
Candidate	Votes	Percentage
Barack Obama	1549	35.07%
Hillary Clinton	341.5	7.73%
Abstain	1	0%
Totals	2,527.0	57.20%

Obama was formally selected as the Democratic nominee through acclamation, put forward by formal rival Senator Hillary Clinton of New York, offering her own delegates to Obama and motioning to suspend the rules of the roll call.

==== Vice president ====
Joe Biden was nominated by acclamation on a voice vote.

== Thursday, August 28 ==
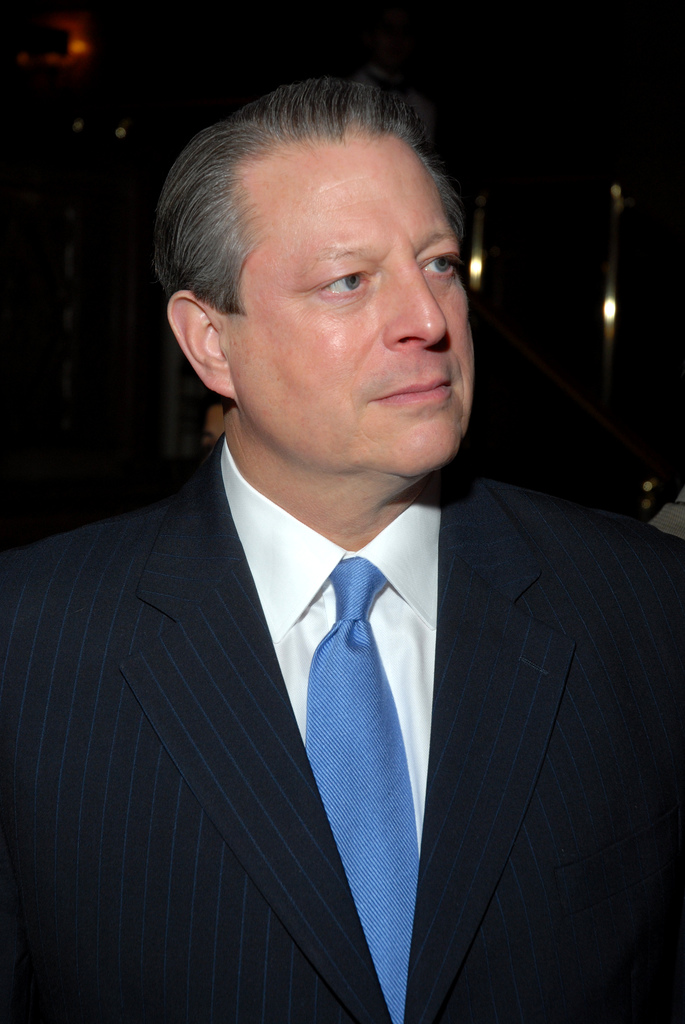
Al Gore

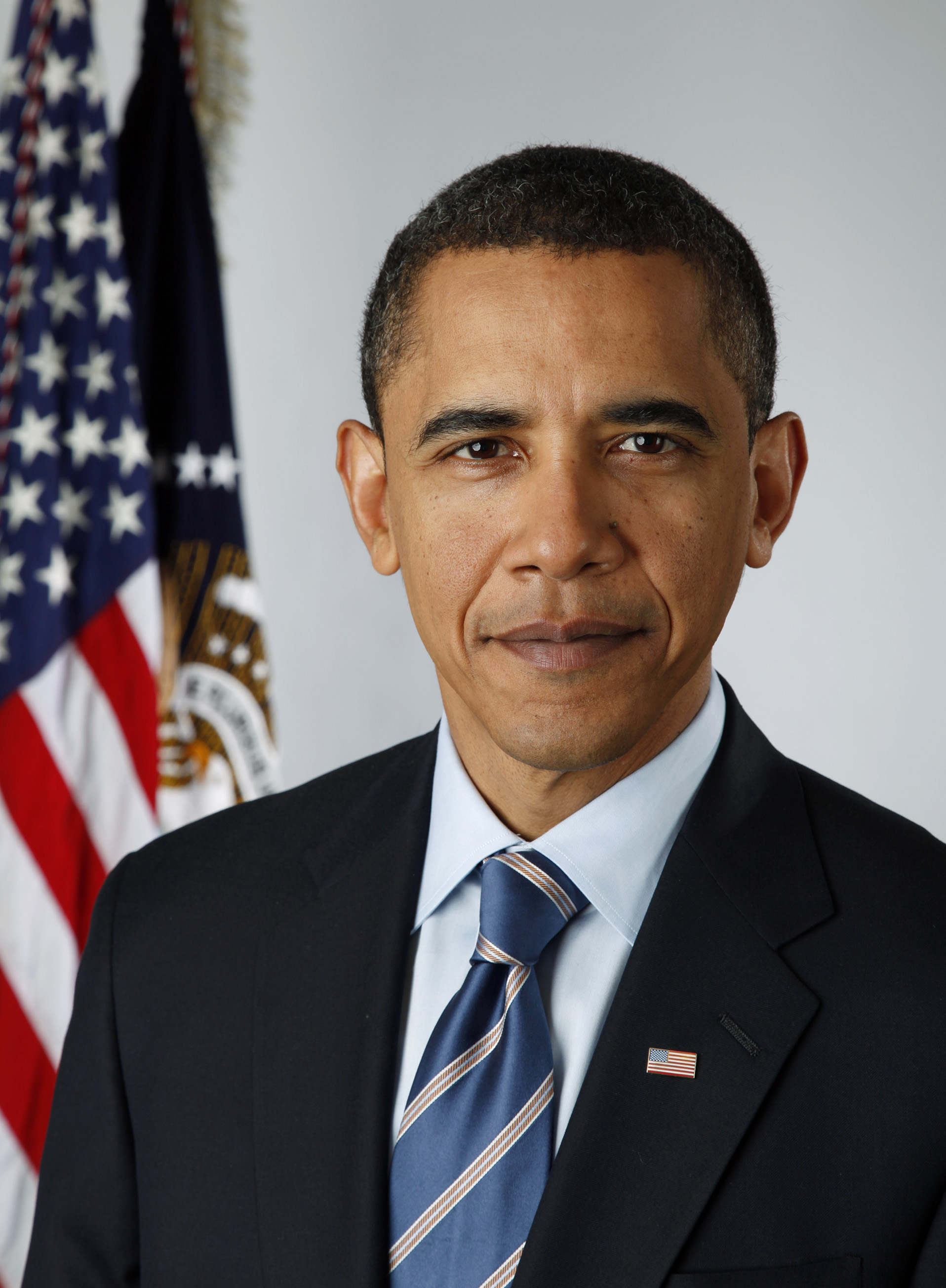
Barack Obama

The theme for the day was "Change You Can Believe In."

Barack Obama accepted the nomination in a speech at INVESCO Field at Mile High on the 45th anniversary of Martin Luther King Jr.'s "I Have a Dream" speech.

Rabbi David Saperstein gave an invocation prior to Obama's speech. Progressive pastor Joel Hunter offered the benediction after Obama's speech. Speaker Pelosi adjourned the convention after the benediction.

=== Principal speakers ===
- Al Gore, 45th Vice President of the United States
- Barack Obama, United States Senator from Illinois

=== Featured speakers ===
- Howard Dean, chair of the Democratic National Committee
- Diana DeGette, United States Representative from Colorado
- Dick Durbin, United States Senator from Illinois
- Susan Eisenhower, granddaughter of President Dwight D. Eisenhower
- J. Scott Gration, retired Major General of the United States Air Force
- Luis Gutierrez, United States Representative from Illinois
- Tim Kaine, Governor of Virginia
- Bernice King, daughter of Martin Luther King, Jr.
- Martin Luther King III, eldest son of Martin Luther King, Jr.
- John Lewis, United States Representative from Georgia
- Ed Perlmutter, United States Representative from Colorado
- David Plouffe, Obama campaign manager
- Bill Richardson, Governor of New Mexico
- Bill Ritter, Governor of Colorado
- Ray Rivera, Obama state director of Colorado
- John Salazar, United States Representative from Colorado
- Jan Schakowsky, United States Representative from Illinois
- Mark Udall, United States Representative from Colorado and candidate for United States Senate

=== Live performances ===
- Jennifer Hudson
- will.i.am, accompanied by John Legend (piano), Agape Choir, and band
- Sheryl Crow A Change Would Do You Good / Out Of Our Heads / Everyday Is A Winding Road Interlude I Can See Clearly Now
- Stevie Wonder
- Michael McDonald
- Yonder Mountain String Band

=== Other ===
- Shawn Johnson, Olympic gymnast, recited the Pledge of Allegiance

== Notes ==
Preceded by 2004; Boston, Massachusetts	Democratic National Conventions	Succeeded by 2012; Charlotte, North Carolina
