= Robert Kniaz =

American venture capitalist (born 1979)

- Other name: Rob Kniaz
- Education: B.S. degree in Computer Science
- Alma mater: University of Maryland
- Occupation: Venture capitalist
- Years active: 2001 - present

Robert (Rob) Kniaz (born May 1979) is an American venture capitalist based in London. He is a founding partner of H Tree Capital, a VC firm investing in deep tech and bio/healthcare, and is founding partner emeritus of Hoxton Ventures, an early-stage investment venture capital firm. Previously, he worked at Google as a product manager for AdSense.

== Education ==
Kniaz was a National Merit Scholarship recipient at St Mary's Ryken High School. Subsequently, in 2001, he graduated from the University of Maryland with a B.S. degree in Computer Science.

== Early career ==
He worked at Intel as a market development manager after graduation. He joined Google as a product manager, where he worked on both Adsense referrals and pay-per-click advertising. He helped develop cost per action advertising (now known as Conversion Optimizer).

== Intellectual Property ==
While working at Google on AdSense, he filed significant US patents for advertising technology particularly around pay-per-action ads, ad syndication and ad tracking. A number of patents remain in the application process both in the US as well as the EU.

This portfolio of patents has been cited 301 times in subsequent patents by others, largely in the online advertising field, particularly around user-generated ads which was filed with investor Tomasz Tunguz, a venture capitalist at Theory.

His notable patents include:

- User-generated advertising, (2009, application abandoned).
- Syndicated trackable ad content, (2011).
- A method for selecting ad pricing model dynamically, (2013).
- Allowing publisher preference of ads shown, (2014).
- Identifying complementary ads, (2014).
- Determining ad value in selection, (2014).

== Hoxton Ventures ==
In 2013, Kniaz and Hussein Kanji founded Hoxton Ventures, an early stage European venture capital firm. Hoxton has been cited as one of Europe's leading "unicorn hunter" VCs with two portfolio companies valued at over $1b as of 2018. Along with his partner, he has been noted by Business Insider as one of Europe's "coolest tech investors" in 2018. The firm has raised over $360m to date and was rated #8 in the world in the Founders Choice VC Leaderboard.

The firm's notable investments include Deliveroo (now public as LSE:ROO), and Darktrace (now public as LSE:DARK),

Kniaz holds board seats on Assetario, Boost Security, Deblock, FabricNano, Flair Impact, Formance, Kheiron Medical, LiliumX, Limbo Revolution, NoMagic, Ordercast, Pear Bio, Phagos, Preply and Spacelift for Hoxton.

Kniaz also previously served on the boards of Bother, Campanja (acquired), Immunio (acquired), Mainframe, Mavrx (acquired), Raptor Supplies and Vatic (insolvent).

== H-Tree Capital ==
Kniaz co-founded the deep tech and biotech VC firm H Tree Capital in 2023. The firm is named after a term from fractal geometry.

== Technology ==
Kniaz is often cited in major news sources for commentary on the European venture capital ecosystem. He also regularly comments on macroeconomic trends as they relate to the venture capital industry as well as international travel trends.

Post Brexit he has provided regular commentary around the position of UK venture capital in Europe in publications such as Bloomberg News, the Evening Standard, and Business Insider.

He is a regular guest on BBC Radio and BBC World Service TV news on the impact of public sector technology companies (especially Google and Apple), as well as on CNBC television.

He is also a regular contributor to Forbes Magazine on venture capital related topics.
