= St. Mary's Ryken High School =

Location
- 22600 Camp Calvert Road; Leonardtown, Maryland; Leonardtown, (St. Mary's County), Maryland 20650; United States; 38°17′16″N 76°37′35″W

Information
- Type: Private, Coeducational
- Religious affiliation: Roman Catholic
- Patron saints: St Francis Xavier, St Therese of lisieux
- Established: 1817 (St. Mary’s Academy), 1957 (Ryken high school), 1981 (merged: St. Marys Ryken)
- Founder: The Sisters of Charity of Nazareth (St. Mary’s Academy) Xavierian Brothers (Ryken High School)
- Status: open
- School district: Archdiocese of Washington Catholic Schools
- President: Dr. Rick Wood
- Dean: Ms. Angela Swann, Dean of Student Life Jason DeLucco, Dean of Academics
- Principal: Thomas Campbell
- Chaplain: Fr. Joseph Cwik
- Staff: 85
- Faculty: 66
- Grades: 9–12
- Enrollment: 700 (2024-2025)
- Average class size: 21
- Student to teacher ratio: 13:1
- Campus size: 87 acres (350,000 m^{2})
- Colors: Blue, Green and White
- Athletics: Sailing, Basketball, Soccer Lacrosse, Swimming, Track, Cross country, Tennis, Baseball, football, weight training.
- Athletics conference: Washington Catholic Athletic Conference
- Mascot: Knight
- Nickname: Knights
- Accreditation: Middle States Association of Colleges and Schools
- Publication: Connections magazine: the magazine for the St Mary’s Ryken community.
- Tuition: Tuition for the 2023-2024 academic year is $19,225
- Website: smrhs.org

St. Mary's Ryken High School, located on an 87-acre (350,000 m^{2}) waterfront campus on Breton Bay, is a coeducational, secondary school sponsored by the Xaverian Brothers. SMR is a member of the National Association of Independent Schools and is accredited by the Middle States Association of Colleges and Secondary Schools, and recognized as an independent, Catholic school by the Archdiocese of Washington and the Maryland State Department of Education.

The campus has a 1,000-seat sports stadium with a turf field and six-lane track and seven buildings: Paschal Hall; The Donnie Williams Center; Rupert Hall; Romuald Hall; Xavier Hall; Alumni Hall (cafeteria); and Lambert Hall (business office).

The large majority of Students come from its various partner schools: St. John's School, Father Andrew White School, St. Michaels School, Our lady Star of the Sea School, and Little Flower School.

Approximately 99% of each graduating class pursues a higher education at a college, university or military service academy. In the Class of 2021, students received over $22 million in scholarship offers.

St. Mary's Ryken provides education for almost 700 students in grades 9-12 and is the only Catholic high school affiliated with the Archdiocese of Washington in the three Southern Maryland counties. Students come from St. Mary's, Calvert, Charles, southern Prince George's, and King George counties.

The school colors are blue, green and white, and the official mascot is the knight.

== History ==
St. Mary's Ryken was established in 1981 and traces its roots in Catholic education to St. Mary's Academy (est. 1885) and Ryken High School (est. 1956).

The Sisters of Charity of Nazareth opened St. Mary's Academy (SMA) in 1885 on the grounds of the property known as Rose Hill in Leonardtown. Mrs. Richard H. Miles bequeathed the property to Father Charles Jenkins, S.J., with the intent that it be used by "a religious order to conduct a Catholic school." SMA grew rapidly as a coeducational boarding school and accepted students from kindergarten through twelfth grade. The burgeoning population of St. Mary's County and Southern Maryland soon rendered the academy too small and a new school building was erected in 1936. In 1956, the school expanded yet again with a dormitory, convent and chapel. With the opening of the new, all boys Ryken High School, the sisters carried on their selfless dedication as a school for young women.

In 1916, to their good fortune, the Xaverian Brothers purchased over one hundred acres along Breton Bay from Mr. Enoch Abell and opened a camp for boys known as Camp Calvert. Young men flocked from the cities to spend a few weeks of their summer vacations there. The brothers' vision for this property was to eventually build a school and novitiate for boys and, in 1956, their dream became reality with the opening of Ryken High School (RHS). The school, named after Theodore James Ryken, founder of the Xaverian order, served as a juniorate for those with vocations to the Xaverian Brothers as well as a high school for young men.

Eventually, with a diminishing number of boarders and vocational candidates, both SMA and RHS closed their dormitories and operated solely as Catholic high schools. SMA and RHS supported each other through sports programs, theater and music productions, dances, proms and academic instruction. By the late 1970s, both schools experienced declining enrollments and agreed to merge into one coeducational Catholic high school.

In 2009, St. Mary's Ryken embarked on the first significant reshaping of its campus in almost 30 years. Phase 1 of the Strategic Master Plan was put into action with the groundbreaking for the SMR Athletic Complex. In this year, all of Paschal Hall was air conditioned and an annex was added that includes an office for the Athletics Director and a new boys' team and locker room. A 340-space parking lot was built on the grounds of the old student parking lot and the field and track behind Paschal Hall. Construction of the new 1,000-seat stadium with pressbox, artificial turf field and six-lane track was completed in August 2010.

The newest building, the Donnie Williams Center (DWC), was finished in 2019 and opened for the 2019–2020 school year. It is a 48,000-square-foot facility featuring a basketball and volleyball court, athletic training facilities, health and wellness class spaces, indoor and outdoor common spaces, a stage, locker rooms, concessions, and campus store. The DWC was named after SMR alumnus Donnie Williams, a successful businessman and believer in community.

== Student life ==
=== Sports ===
St. Mary's Ryken is a member of the Washington Catholic Athletic Conference.

The varsity football team won three straight Washington Catholic Athletic Conference Metro Division Championship 2018, 2019 and 2021. There was no postseason in 2020 due to COVID-19.

St. Mary's Ryken's wrestling team claimed its first Washington Catholic Athletic Conference championship in program history in 2020.

The varsity softball team captured the 2014 WCAC conference title. Other athletics champions: in 2010, a member of the SMR golf team won the individual WCAC golf championship; in 2007, the boys lacrosse team won the WCAC conference title.

Fall sports: cross country, field hockey, cheerleading, football, sailing, soccer, tennis and volleyball; Winter sports: basketball, cheerleading, ice hockey, swimming and wrestling; Spring sports: baseball, golf, lacrosse, sailing, softball, tennis and track & field.

=== Fine arts ===
Concert band, orchestra, jazz band, drama, dance, chorus, photography, art appreciation, pre-architecture, pottery, sculpture, photography and studio art are the main fine art classes and clubs. Each has at least one concert, rehearsal or showcase during the school year.

=== Uniform ===
Students wear button-down shirts and blazers with dress pants or skirts in the winter and polo shirts with khaki shorts or skirts in the summer. The polo shirt colors are navy blue and forest green. Clubs and sports polo shirts are also allowed. Underclassmen wear green and blue SMR ties. The winter uniform includes a navy blue blazer.

== General information ==
- Full-time faculty : 55
- Full-time administrators : 4
- Full-time staff : 24
- AP Classes offered : 24

== Education ==
Students must complete 28 credits and 65 hours of community service to graduate. They are required to take four social studies credits, four English, four religion (except in the case of transfer students), four math, three science, three of the same foreign language, one fine arts, one technology, one physical education, and four electives. Courses are taken at the college preparatory, honors or Advanced Placement level.

== Notable alumni ==
- J. Ernest Bell II (born 1941) - Member of the Maryland House of Delegates
- John L. Bohanan, Jr. - Member of the Maryland House of Delegates
- John Flowers — American professional basketball player for Club Atlético Peñarol of the Liga Uruguaya de Básquetbol
- Alfred Gough - Prominent film writer and producer
- Treveon Graham - 5th all-time leading scorer for the VCU Rams and former NBA player
- Robert Kniaz - technology venture capitalist
