= Jerry Clark (politician) =

American politician (born 1952)

Gerald "Jerry" Clark
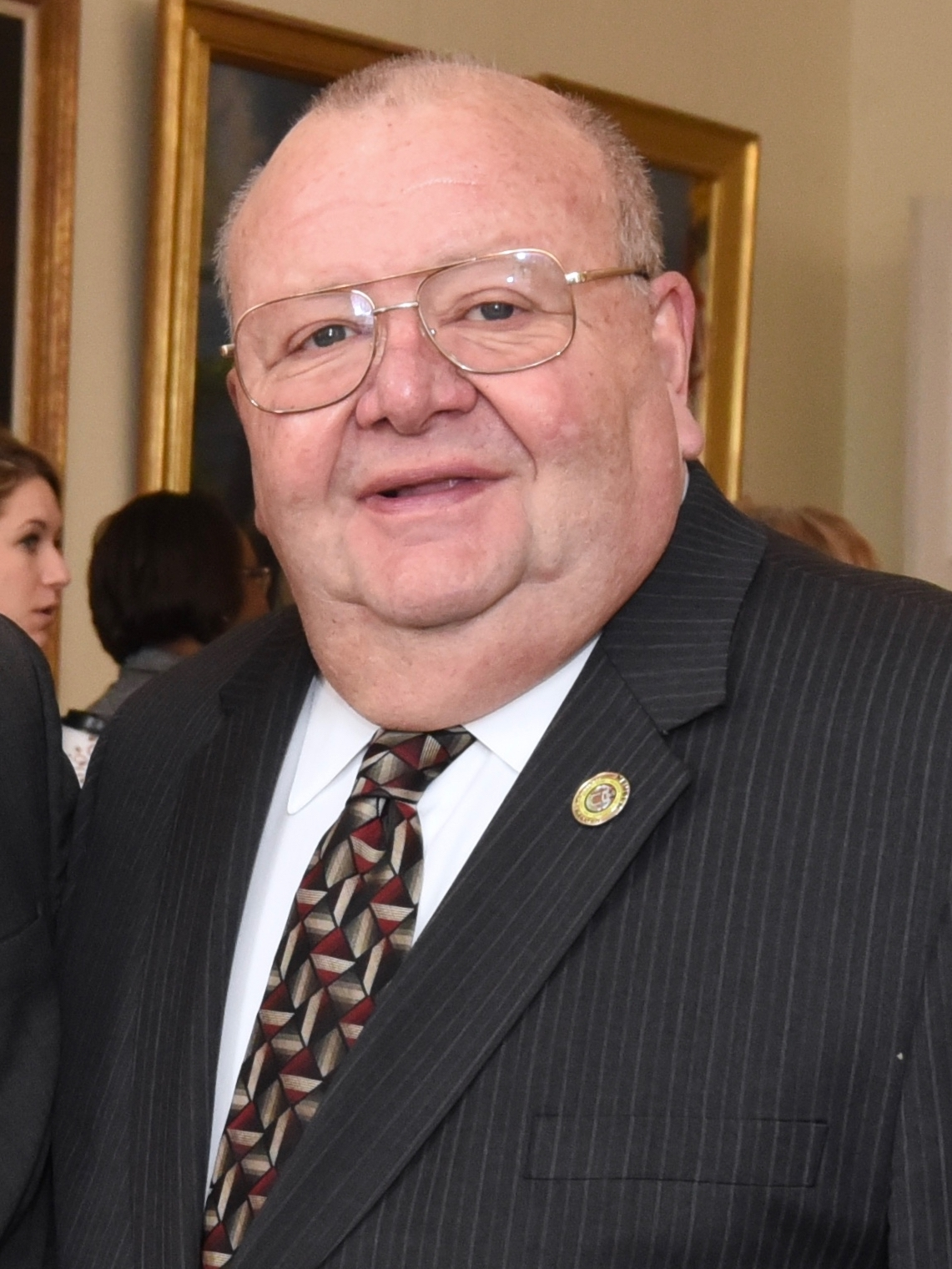
- Clark in 2018

Member of the Maryland House of Delegates from District 29C
- In office October 13, 2016 – January 11, 2023
- Preceded by: Tony O'Donnell
- Succeeded by: Todd Morgan

Personal details
- Born: November 29, 1952 (age 73)
- Party: Republican

Gerald Clark (born November 29, 1952) is a Republican politician. Clark represented District 29C of the Maryland House of Delegates from when he was appointed to the position on October 13, 2016, to January 11, 2023.

== Early life and career ==
Clark was born in Maryland on November 29, 1952, and attended Central High School in Seat Pleasant, Maryland. He is a small business owner, having operated the Port of Call Wine and Spirits in Solomons, Maryland, since 1979.

From 2002 to 2014, Clark served on the Calvert County Board of Commissioners. Since 2016, he has been a member of the Tri-County Council for Southern Maryland.

In 2014, Port of Call Liquors was cited for violations of the law prohibiting the sale of alcohol to minors. The Calvert County Liquor Board imposed Clark's business with a five day suspension, 30 days of abeyance, and a $1,000 fine.

In September 2016, Governor Larry Hogan appointed Clark to the Maryland House of Delegates, filling a seat left by former Delegate Tony O'Donnell, who had been appointed by Hogan to serve on the Maryland Public Service Commission.

== In the legislature ==
Clark was sworn into the Maryland House of Delegates on October 13, 2016.

Clark filed to run in the 2018 election. He was unopposed in the Republican primary, but faced Democratic candidate Julia Nichols in the general election. During the election, Clark endorsed Jack Bailey in his race for Maryland State Senate District 29. He won with 57% of the vote.

In January 2022, Clark announced that he would not seek re-election in the 2022 Maryland House of Delegates election.

=== Committee assignments ===
- Environment and Transportation Committee, 2017–2023 (local government & bi-county issues subcommittee, 2017–2018; natural resources, agriculture & open space subcommittee, 2017–2023; land use & ethics subcommittee, 2019–2023)

== Electoral history ==
Calvert County Board of Commissioners Republican Primary Election, 2002
Party	Candidate	Votes	%
Republican	David F. Hale	3,630	18
Republican	Susan Ellsworth Shaw	3,303	17
Republican	Linda L. Kelley	2,887	15
Republican	Roger Tracy	2,401	12
Republican	Jerry Clark	2,380	12
Republican	John Douglass Parran	2,366	12
Republican	Maggie Thomas	1,728	9
Republican	Culver Ladd	881	4
Republican	Emad Dides	313	2

Calvert County Board of Commissioners General Election, 2002
Party	Candidate	Votes	%
Republican	David F. Hale	14,686	13
Democratic	Wilson Parran	12,656	11
Republican	Susan Ellsworth Shaw	12,582	11
Republican	Linda L. Kelley	12,197	11
Democratic	Barbara A. Stinnett	11,323	10
Democratic	Thomas Michael Pelagatti	11,205	10
Republican	Jerry Clark	10,996	10
Democratic	Grace Mary Brady	10,980	10
Democratic	Gene Karol	9,792	8
Republican	Roger Tracy	9,159	8

Calvert County Board of Commissioners Republican Primary Election, 2006
Party	Candidate	Votes	%
Republican	Susan Ellsworth Shaw	2,659	15
Republican	Linda L. Kelley	2,550	14
Republican	Cal Steuart	2,296	13
Republican	Jerry Clark	2,230	12
Republican	Michael Benton	1,616	9
Republican	William Chambers	1,606	9
Republican	Jan Horton	1,605	9
Republican	Patrick E. Flaherty	1,288	7
Republican	Cal Steuart	1,175	7
Republican	Ben Ridgely	508	3
Republican	Ford Gallagher	360	2

Calvert County Board of Commissioners General Election, 2006
Party	Candidate	Votes	%
Democratic	Wilson H. Parran	15,902	12
Republican	Susan Shaw	14,144	11
Republican	Linda L. Kelley	14,052	11
Democratic	Barbara A. Stinnett	12,729	10
Republican	Jerry Clark	12,726	10
Democratic	Mark Frazer	12,715	10
Democratic	Dixie C. Miller	11,681	9
Republican	Cal Steuart	11,038	9
Republican	Mike Benton	10,557	8
Democratic	E. Lloyd Robertson	7,690	6
Unknown	Doug Parran	6,490	5
Other/Write-ins	Other/Write-ins	127	0

Calvert County Board of Commissioners Republican Primary Election, 2010
Party	Candidate	Votes	%
Republican	Evan Slaughenhoupt	3,352	14
Republican	Susan Shaw	3,258	13
Republican	Steve Weems	3,162	13
Republican	Jerry Clark	3,091	13
Republican	Pat Nutter	3,082	13
Republican	Linda Kelley	2,960	12
Republican	Patrick Edward Flaherty	2,261	9
Republican	Timothy Wayne Hardesty	1,780	7
Republican	Jackie Porter	1,175	5

Calvert County Board of Commissioners General Election, 2010
Party	Candidate	Votes	%
Republican	Susan Shaw	15,374	11
Republican	Pat Nutter	15,040	11
Republican	Steve Weems	14,646	11
Republican	Jerry Clark	13,233	10
Republican	Evan Slaughenhoupt	13,133	10
Democratic	Wilson H. Parran	12,996	9
Democratic	Kelly D. McConkey	11,769	9
Democratic	Kimberly Mackall	11,754	9
Democratic	Barbara A. Stinnett	11,195	8
Democratic	William J. "Bill" Phalen	9,356	7
Unaffiliated	V. Charles Donnelly	5,719	4
Republican (write-in)	Linda Kelley	2,880	2
Other/Write-ins	Other/Write-ins	171	0
Libertarian (write-in)	Rich Falcone	77	0

Calvert County Board of Commissioners District 1 Republican Primary Election, 2014
Party	Candidate	Votes	%
Republican	Mike Hart	2,231	40
Republican	Gerald W. "Jerry" Clark	1,887	34
Republican	Joe Chenelly	1,409	26

Maryland House of Delegates District 29C Republican Primary Election, 2018
Party	Candidate	Votes	%
Republican	Gerald W. "Jerry" Clark	2,657	100

Maryland House of Delegates District 29C General Election, 2018
Party	Candidate	Votes	%
Republican	Gerald W. "Jerry" Clark	10,087	57
Democratic	Julia Margaret Nichols	7,580	43
Other/Write-in	Other/Write-in	31	0
