= J. Ernest Bell II =

American politician (born 1941)

Member of the Maryland House of Delegates from the 29B district
- In office 1983–1994
- Preceded by: district established
- Succeeded by: John F. Slade III

Personal details
- Born: April 26, 1941 (age 85) Leonardtown, Maryland, U.S.
- Party: Democratic
- Children: 4
- Education: Mount St. Mary's University (BS); Columbus School of Law (JD)
- Occupation: Politician; lawyer

Military service
- Allegiance: United States
- Branch/service: United States Marine Corps
- Years of service: 1966–1970

J. Ernest Bell II (born April 26, 1941) is an American politician and lawyer. He served in the Maryland House of Delegates from 1983 to 1994, representing District 29B.

== Early life ==
J. Ernest Bell II was born on April 26, 1941, in Leonardtown, Maryland. He graduated from St. Mary's Ryken High School in 1959. Bell graduated from Mount St. Mary's University with a Bachelor of Science in 1963. He graduated from the Columbus School of Law in Catholic University of America with a J.D. in 1966. He was admitted to the bar in Maryland in 1970.

== Career ==
Bell served as a captain in the U.S. Marine Corps from 1966 to 1970. He received a Navy Achievement Medal. He then worked as an attorney.

Bell served as a member of the Maryland House of Delegates, representing District 29B and St. Mary's County, Maryland from 1983 to 1994. He was a Democrat.

== Personal life ==
Bell is married and has four children.
