= Steny Hoyer =

American politician (born 1939)

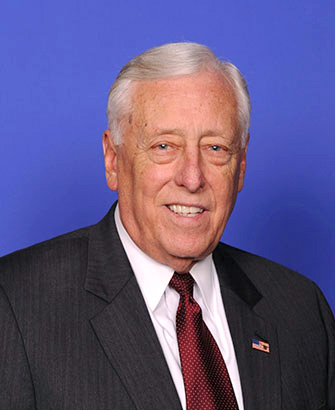
- Official portrait, 2018

Member of the U.S. House of Representatives from Maryland's 5th district
- Incumbent
- Assumed office May 19, 1981
- Preceded by: Gladys Spellman
House positions
House Majority Leader
In office January 3, 2019 – January 3, 2023
Speaker	Nancy Pelosi
Whip	Jim Clyburn
Preceded by	Kevin McCarthy
Succeeded by	Steve Scalise
In office January 3, 2007 – January 3, 2011
Speaker	Nancy Pelosi
Whip	Jim Clyburn
Preceded by	John Boehner
Succeeded by	Eric Cantor
House Minority Whip
In office January 3, 2011 – January 3, 2019
Leader	Nancy Pelosi
Preceded by	Eric Cantor
Succeeded by	Steve Scalise
In office January 3, 2003 – January 3, 2007
Leader	Nancy Pelosi
Preceded by	Nancy Pelosi
Succeeded by	Roy Blunt
Chair of the House Democratic Caucus
In office June 21, 1989 – January 3, 1995
Leader	Tom Foley
Preceded by	Bill Gray
Succeeded by	Vic Fazio
Vice Chair of the House Democratic Caucus
In office January 3, 1989 – June 21, 1989
Leader	Jim Wright
Preceded by	Mary Rose Oakar
Succeeded by	Vic Fazio

President of the Maryland Senate
- In office January 3, 1975 – January 3, 1978
- Preceded by: William S. James
- Succeeded by: James Clark Jr.

Member of the Maryland Senate
- In office January 3, 1975 – January 3, 1978
- Preceded by: Constituency established
- Succeeded by: Mike Donovan
- Constituency: 26th district
- In office January 1967 – January 1975
- Preceded by: Constituency established
- Succeeded by: Constituency abolished
- Constituency: 4C district

Personal details
- Born: Steny Hamilton Hoyer; June 14, 1939 (age 87) New York City, U.S.
- Party: Democratic
- Spouse(s): Judith Pickett (m. 1961; died 1997) Elaine Kamarck (m. 2023)
- Children: 3
- Education: University of Maryland (BA); Georgetown University (JD)
- Website: House website Campaign website
- Hoyer's voice Hoyer honoring Mitch King, a retiring government relations manager for the United States Postal Service. Recorded April 22, 2009

Steny Hamilton Hoyer (/ˈstɛni ˈhɔɪər/ STEN-ee HOY-ər; born June 14, 1939) is an American politician and retired attorney who has served as the U.S. representative for Maryland's 5th congressional district since 1981. From 2003 to 2023, Hoyer was the second-ranking Democrat in the House of Representatives behind Nancy Pelosi. He served twice as House Majority Leader, from 2007 to 2011 and again from 2019 to 2023.

Hoyer was first elected in a 1981 special election and began his 23rd term in 2025. His district includes a large swath of rural and suburban territory southeast of Washington, D.C. He is currently the most senior Democrat in the House and the dean of Maryland congressional delegation. Hoyer has also twice served as the House minority whip (2003–2007 and 2011–2019), with Pelosi as minority leader. In November 2022, Hoyer announced that he, along with Pelosi, would not seek a leadership position in the 118th Congress. He was re-elected in 2024, and on January 7, 2026, announced that he would not seek a 24th term in that year's election.

== Early life and education ==
Hoyer was born in New York City but grew up in Mitchellville, Maryland, the son of Jean (née Baldwin) and Steen Theilgaard Høyer. His father was Danish and a native of Copenhagen; "Steny" is a variant of his father's name, "Steen". His mother was an American with Scottish, German, and English ancestry and a descendant of John Hart, a signer of the US Declaration of Independence.

Steny Hoyer graduated from Suitland High School in Suitland, Maryland. In 1963, Hoyer received his Bachelor of Arts degree magna cum laude and graduated Omicron Delta Kappa from the University of Maryland, College Park. He was a member of the Sigma Chi fraternity. He earned his Juris Doctor from the Georgetown University Law Center in 1966.

== Early political career ==
From 1962 to 1966, Hoyer was a member of the staff of U.S. senator Daniel Brewster; also on Brewster's staff at that time was Nancy Pelosi.

In 1966, Hoyer won a newly created seat in the Maryland State Senate, representing Prince George's County–based Senate district 4C. The district, created in the aftermath of Reynolds v. Sims, was renumbered as the 26th in 1975, the same year that Hoyer was elected president of the Maryland State Senate, the youngest in state history.

From 1969 to 1971, Hoyer served as the first vice president of the Young Democrats of America.

In 1978, Hoyer sought the Democratic nomination for lieutenant governor of Maryland as the running mate of then acting Governor Blair Lee III, but lost to Samuel Bogley, 37%–34%. The same year, Hoyer was appointed to the Maryland Board of Higher Education, a position he held until 1981.

== U.S. House of Representatives ==
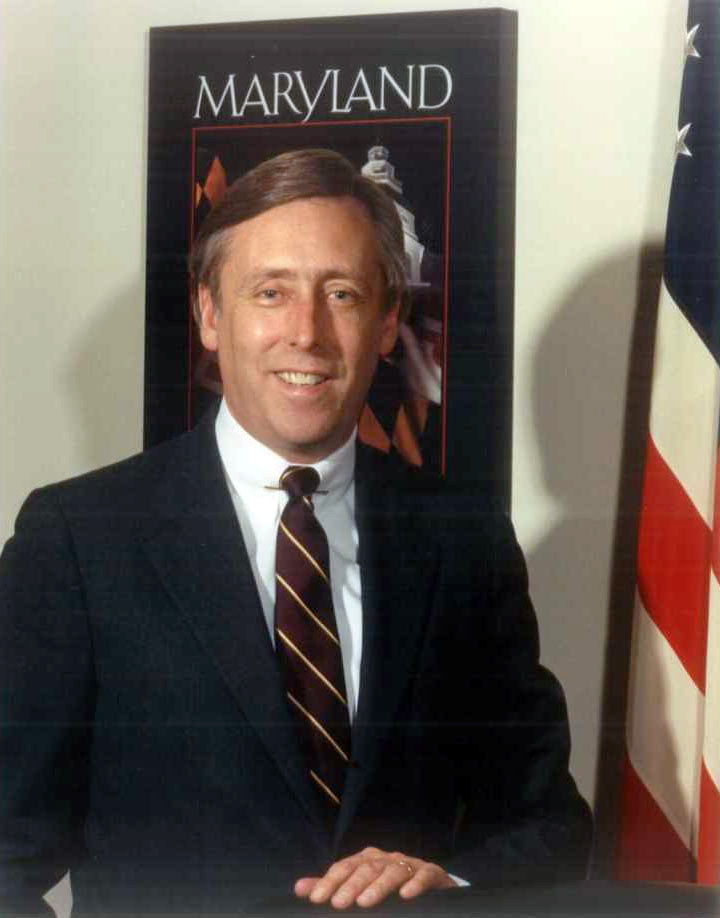
Congressional portrait of Hoyer, circa 1981

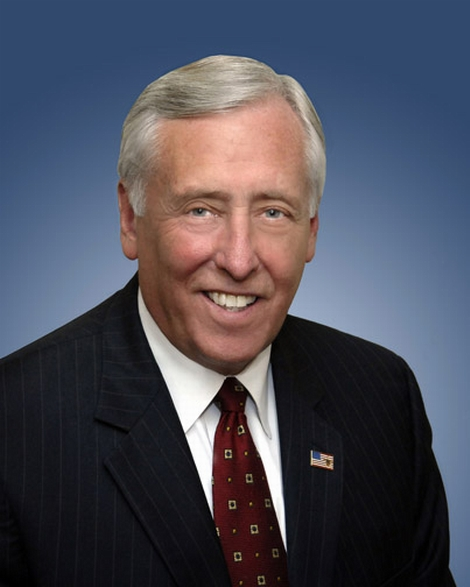
Hoyer in 2008 as House Majority Leader

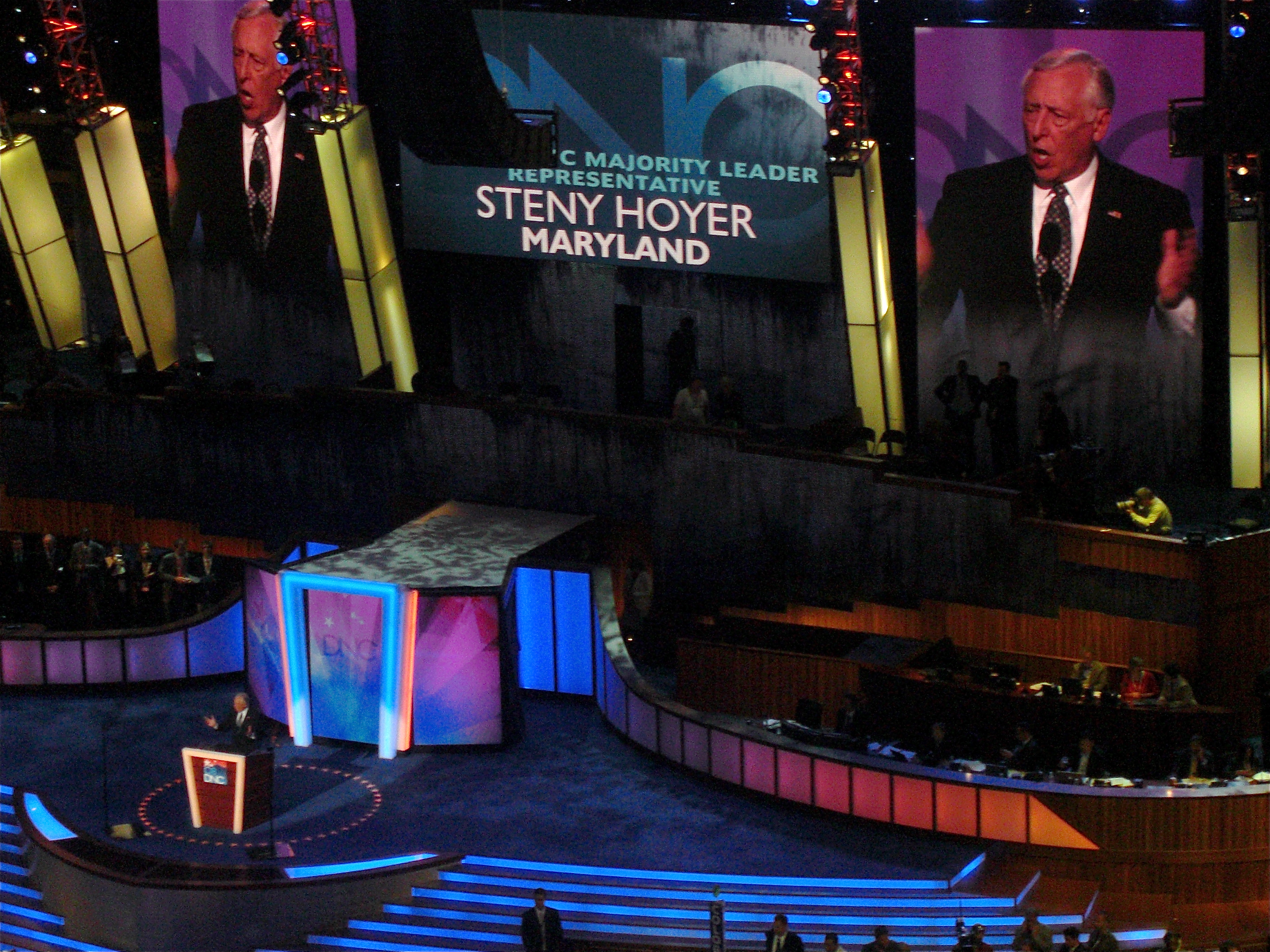
Hoyer speaks during the second day of the 2008 Democratic National Convention in Denver, Colorado.

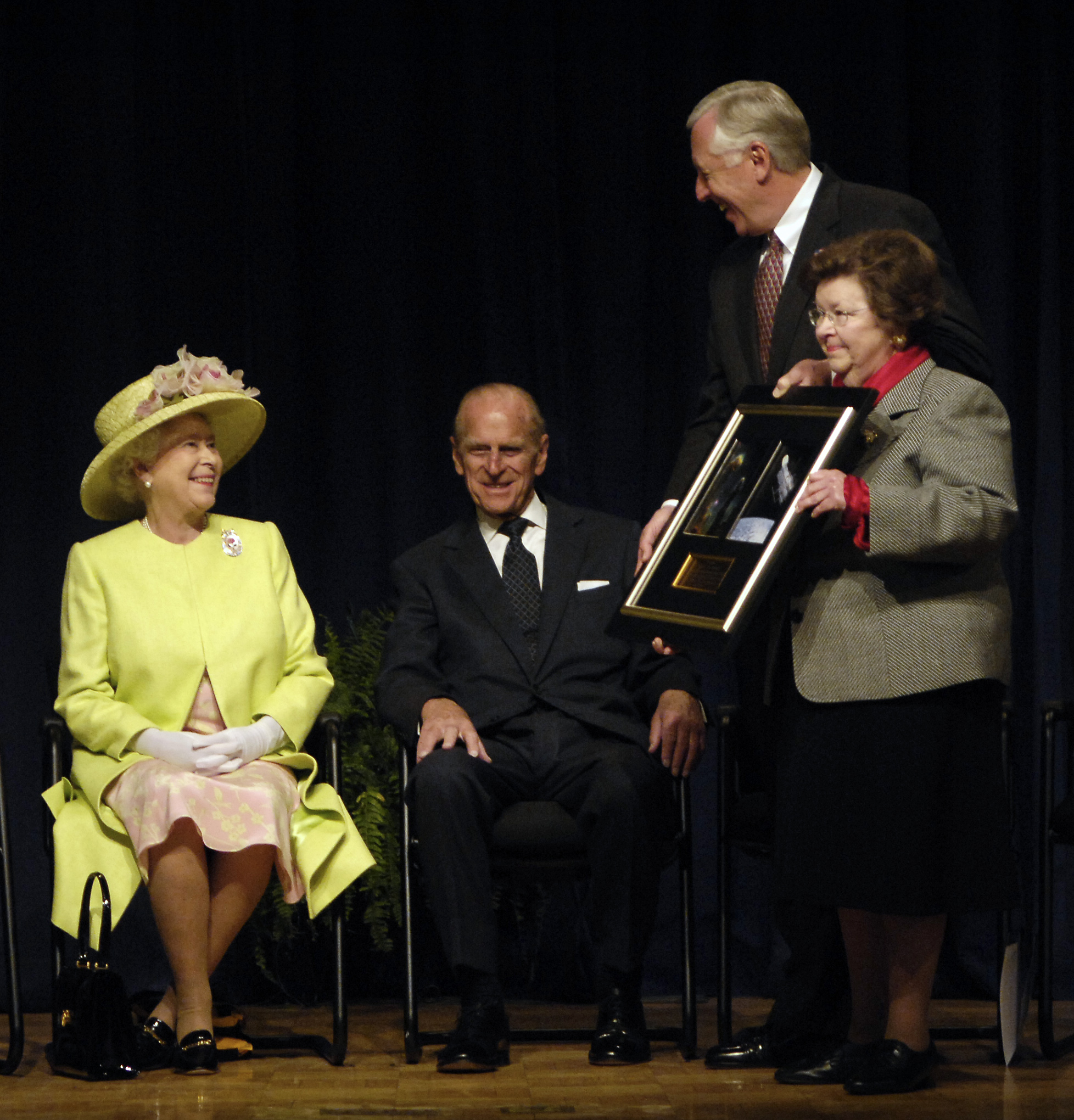
Hoyer with Barbara Mikulski presenting a photo to Queen Elizabeth II and Prince Philip in Greenbelt, Maryland

=== Elections ===
Fifth district Congresswoman Gladys Spellman fell into a coma shortly before the 1980 election. She was reelected, but it soon became apparent that she would never regain consciousness, and Congress declared her seat vacant by resolution in February 1981. Hoyer narrowly won a crowded seven-way Democratic primary, beating Spellman's husband, Reuben, by only 1,600 votes. He defeated a better-funded Republican, Bowie Mayor Audrey Scott, in the May 19 special election. 56%–44%, earning himself the nickname "boy wonder". In the 1982 general election, Hoyer was reelected to a full term with 80% of the vote. He has faced only one relatively close contest since then, when he defeated future Governor of Maryland Larry Hogan with 53% of the vote in 1992. His second-lowest margin of victory was his 1996 race against Republican State Delegate John Morgan, when he received 57% of the vote. Hoyer has been reelected 14 times with no substantive opposition and is the longest-serving House member ever from Maryland.

=== Tenure ===
==== Domestic issues ====
Hoyer supports and has led the Make It In America plan linking the domestic manufacturing industry and overall U.S. economic success.

Hoyer is pro-choice on abortion rights. He voted against the Partial-Birth Abortion Ban Act in 2003. (However, at the height of national polarization after the Supreme Court's intention to overturn Roe v. Wade leaked, Hoyer controversially endorsed a pro-life incumbent House member over his pro-choice primary challenger.) Hoyer supports affirmative action and LGBT rights. He is rated "F" by the NRA Political Victory Fund, indicating that he tends to vote in favor of gun control.

In 2008, Hoyer said he opposed providing immunity to telecom companies, but then negotiated a bill, which Senators Patrick Leahy and Russ Feingold called a "capitulation", that would provide immunity to any telecom company that had been told by the George W. Bush administration that its actions were legal. "No matter how they spin it, this is still immunity", said Kevin Bankston, a senior lawyer for the Electronic Frontier Foundation, a privacy rights group that sued over Bush's wiretapping program. "It's not compromise, it's pure theater."

In June 2010, Hoyer brought up the idea that Congress could temporarily extend middle-class tax cuts set to expire at the end of the year, suggesting that making them permanent would cost too much. President Obama wanted to extend them permanently for people making less than $200,000 a year and families making less than $250,000.

Hoyer voted against the impeachment of President Bill Clinton in 1999. In 2019 and 2021, Hoyer voted to impeach President Donald Trump.

In February 2021, Hoyer made a speech in Congress that has been viewed online more than two million times, criticizing a Facebook post by U.S. Representative Marjorie Taylor Greene. The post featured a gun-toting Greene next to three members of the "Squad"—Representatives Ilhan Omar, Alexandria Ocasio-Cortez, and Rashida Tlaib—with the caption "Democrats' Worst Nightmare". In his speech, Hoyer compared Greene's words with those of Representative Steve King, who was removed from the Judiciary and Agriculture Committees in 2019 after comments he made to The New York Times questioning why white supremacy was considered offensive. Hoyer said that, in both posts, Greene had promoted baseless conspiracy theories far more offensive and incendiary than the comment that led Republicans to strip King of his committee roles. He asked his colleagues on both sides of the aisle to "do the decent thing" and strip Greene of her committee roles. The vote succeeded, with 11 Republicans joining Democrats to pass the motion to remove.

==== Foreign issues ====
Hoyer supports civilian nuclear cooperation with India.

Hoyer initially supported the Iraq War and was recognized by the DLC for his vocal leadership on this issue. After the war became publicly unpopular, he said he favored a "responsible redeployment". But he repeatedly supported legislation to continue funding the war without deadlines for troop withdrawal, most recently in return for increased funding of domestic projects.

Hoyer is a supporter of Israel, and has often been allied with American Israel Public Affairs Committee (AIPAC). In September 2007, he criticized Representative Jim Moran for suggesting that AIPAC "has pushed [the Iraq] war from the beginning", calling the comment "factually inaccurate". In January 2017, he voted for a House resolution condemning UN Security Council Resolution 2334, which called Israeli settlement building in the occupied Palestinian territories a flagrant violation of international law and a major obstacle to peace.

Hoyer supported President Trump's decision to recognize Jerusalem as Israel's capital. In 2023, he voted with an overwhelming bipartisan majority to provide Israel with whatever support is necessary in the "barbaric war" in Gaza started by Hamas and other terrorists following the October 7 attacks.

Hoyer has said that a nuclear Iran is "unacceptable" and that the use of force remains an option.

In January 2019, Hoyer opposed Trump's planned withdrawal of U.S. troops from Syria and Afghanistan as "impulsive, irresponsible, and dangerous". He supports former President Obama's call for authorizing limited but decisive military action in response to the Assad regime's alleged use of chemical weapons.

Hoyer is a former chair of the Commission on Security and Cooperation in Europe. During an AIPAC-led August 2025 summer trip to Israel amid the Gaza humanitarian crisis, Hoyer said in a video recorded for AIPAC, "What we found is that contrary to world opinion, Israel has been doing everything it possibly can to ensure that there’s minimal damage to civilians who are not part of Hamas's army. Unfortunately, the world is not seeing that. The world has got a view that I don't think is accurate." Hoyer was referred to as a long-term unofficial leader to AIPAC-led trips.

==== Maritime law ====
Hoyer voted for the Abandoned Shipwrecks Act of 1987. The Act asserts United States title to certain abandoned shipwrecks located on or embedded in submerged lands under state jurisdiction, and transfers title to the respective state, thereby empowering states to manage these cultural and historical resources more efficiently, with the goal of preventing treasure hunters and salvagers from damaging them. President Ronald Reagan signed it into law on April 28, 1988.

==== Legislation ====
On February 28, 2014, Hoyer introduced the bill to amend the National Law Enforcement Museum Act to extend the termination date (H.R. 4120; 113th Congress). The bill would extend until November 9, 2016, the authority of the National Law Enforcement Officers Memorial Fund, a nonprofit organization, to construct a museum on federal lands in the District of Columbia honoring law enforcement officers.

==== Fundraising ====
Hoyer is a donor for House Democrats. He has donated large sums to fellow party members in the House. In the 2008 election cycle, he contributed more than $1 million to the party and individual candidates.

=== Committee assignments ===
For the 119th Congress:

- Committee on Appropriations
  - Subcommittee on Financial Services and General Government (Ranking Member)
  - Subcommittee on Labor, Health and Human Services, Education, and Related Agencies
  - Subcommittee on the Legislative Branch

=== Caucus memberships ===
- Black Maternal Health Caucus
- Congressional Ukraine Caucus

=== Party leadership ===
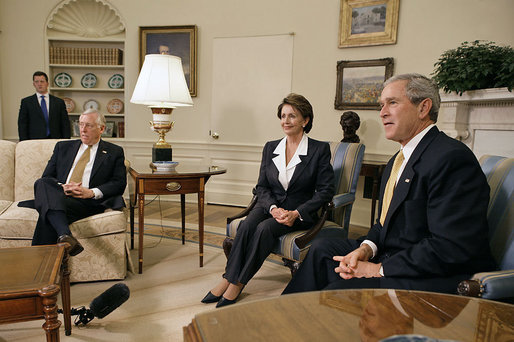
Then-President George W. Bush meets with soon to be Speaker of the House Nancy Pelosi and soon to be House Majority Leader Steny Hoyer on November 9, 2006.

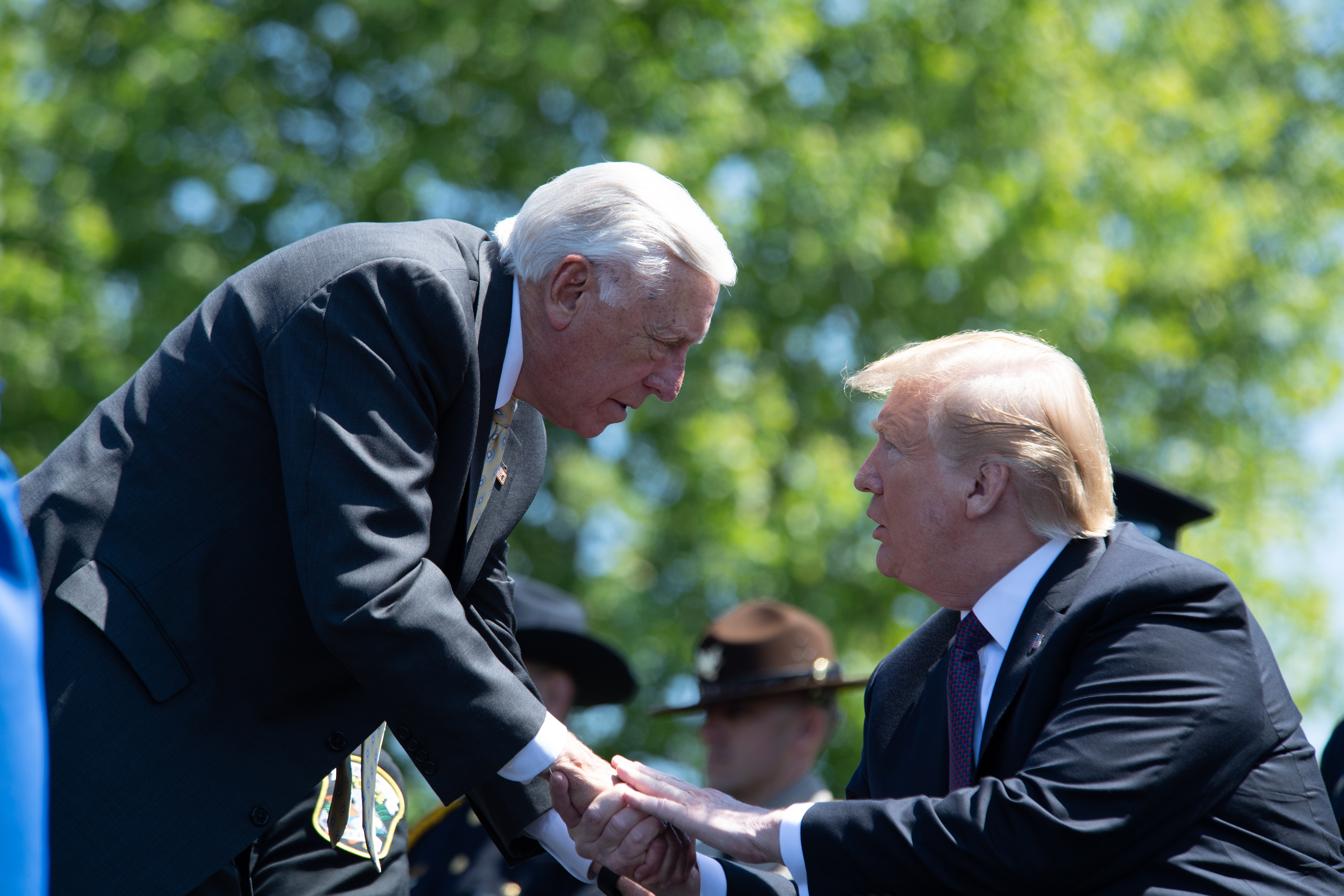
Hoyer with President Donald Trump in 2019

Hoyer served as chair of the Democratic Caucus, the fourth-ranking position among House Democrats, from 1989 to 1994; a former co-chair of the Democratic Steering Committee; and as the chief candidate recruiter for House Democrats from 1995 to 2000. He also served as Deputy Majority Whip from 1987 to 1989.

When David E. Bonior resigned as minority whip in early 2002, Hoyer ran in the race to succeed him but lost to Nancy Pelosi. After the 2002 midterm elections, Pelosi ran to succeed Dick Gephardt as minority leader, leaving the minority whip post open again. On November 14, 2002, Hoyer's colleagues in the Democratic Caucus unanimously elected him minority whip, the second-highest-ranking position among House Democrats.

Pelosi became the Speaker of the House in January 2007. Hoyer was elected by his colleagues to be House Majority Leader for the 110th Congress, defeating John Murtha of Pennsylvania by a vote of 149–86 within the caucus, despite Pelosi's endorsement of Murtha. Hoyer was the first Marylander to become Majority Leader and became the highest-ranking federal lawmaker in Maryland history. In this post, Hoyer was the House Democrats' floor leader and ranked second in the leadership, after the Speaker.

The day after the 2010 midterm elections, in which the Democrats lost control of the House, Hoyer had a private conversation with Pelosi and said he would not challenge her for minority leader. He ran for minority whip, but was challenged by outgoing Majority Whip Jim Clyburn (the top House Democrats wanted to remain in the leadership, but the minority party in the House has one less position). Hoyer is moderate while Pelosi and Clyburn are more liberal, and a significant number of Hoyer's would-be supporters in the House who were moderate and conservative Democrats had been defeated for reelection. The Congressional Black Caucus backed Clyburn, while 30 House Democrats have supported Hoyer. Hoyer received further support from outgoing Foreign Affairs Committee Chairman Howard L. Berman, Financial Services Committee Chairman Barney Frank, and outgoing Energy and Commerce Committee Chairman Henry A. Waxman. Pelosi intervened in the contest by supporting Hoyer as Minority Whip, while creating an "Assistant Leader" position for Clyburn, which would keep him as the third-ranking Democrat in the House behind Pelosi and Hoyer (the existing "Assistant to the Leader" post formerly held by Chris Van Hollen is not officially part of the House leadership and was directly appointed by the Minority Leader).

Hoyer and the Democratic Congressional Campaign Committee (DCCC) have been criticized for picking their preferred candidates through an undemocratic process. In 2018, it was reported that Hoyer sought to influence the primary race in Colorado's 6th congressional district. He was recorded urging progressive candidate Levi Tillemann to drop out of the race. Hoyer acknowledged that the DCCC had already identified its preferred candidate and discouraged a candid discussion about his weaknesses. On November 28, 2018, Hoyer was selected to return as House Majority Leader.

== Electoral history ==
Year	Office	Election	Subject	Party	Votes	%	Opponent	Party	Votes	%	Opponent	Party	Votes	%	Opponent	Party	Votes	%
1981	Congress, 5th district	Special	Steny Hoyer	Democratic	42,573	55.81	Audrey Scott	Republican	33,708	44.19								
1982	Congress, 5th district	General	Steny Hoyer	Democratic	83,937	79.58	William Guthrie	Republican	21,533	20.42								
1984	Congress, 5th district	General	Steny Hoyer	Democratic	116,310	72.18	John Ritchie	Republican	44,839	27.82								
1986	Congress, 5th district	General	Steny Hoyer	Democratic	82,098	81.93	John Sellner	Republican	18,102	18.07								
1988	Congress, 5th district	General	Steny Hoyer	Democratic	128,437	78.63	John Sellner	Republican	34,909	21.37								
1990	Congress, 5th district	General	Steny Hoyer	Democratic	84,747	80.66	Lee Breuer	Republican	20,314	19.34								
1992	Congress, 5th district	General	Steny Hoyer	Democratic	113,280	55.0	Larry J. Hogan Jr.	Republican	92,636	45.0								
1994	Congress, 5th district	General	Steny Hoyer	Democratic	98,821	58.81	Donald Devine	Republican	69,211	41.19								
1996	Congress, 5th district	General	Steny Hoyer	Democratic	121,288	56.92	John S. Morgan	Republican	91,806	43.08								
1998	Congress, 5th district	General	Steny Hoyer	Democratic	126,792	65.37	Robert Ostrom	Republican	67,176	34.36								
2000	Congress, 5th district	General	Steny Hoyer	Democratic	166,231	65.09	Thomas Hutchins	Republican	89,019	34.86								
2002	Congress, 5th district	General	Steny Hoyer	Democratic	137,903	69.27	Joseph Crawford	Republican	60,758	30.52								
2004	Congress, 5th district	General	Steny Hoyer	Democratic	204,867	68.72	Brad Jewitt	Republican	87,189	29.25	Bob Auerbach	Green	4,224	1.42	Steve Krukar	Constitution	1,849	0.62
2006	Congress, 5th district	General	Steny Hoyer	Democratic	168,114	82.69	Steve Warner	Green	33,464	16.46	Peter Kuhnert	Constitution	635	0.31	Other write-ins		1,110	0.55
2008	Congress, 5th district	General	Steny Hoyer	Democratic	253,854	73.65	Collins Bailey	Republican	82,631	23.97	Darlene Nicholas	Libertarian	7,829	2.27	Write-ins		377	0.11
2010	Congress, 5th district	General	Steny Hoyer	Democratic	155,110	64.26	Charles Lollar	Republican	83,575	34.62	H. Gavin Shickle	Libertarian	2,578	1.07	Write-ins		120	0.05
2012	Congress, 5th district	General	Steny Hoyer	Democratic	238,618	69.40	Tony O'Donnell	Republican	95,271	27.71	Bob Auerbach	Green	5,040	1.47	Arvin Vohra	Libertarian	4,503	1.31
2014	Congress, 5th district	General	Steny Hoyer	Democratic	144,725	64.03	Chris Chafee	Republican	80,752	35.72	Write-ins		563	0.25				
2016	Congress, 5th district	General	Steny Hoyer	Democratic	242,989	67.38	Mark Arness	Republican	105,931	29.37	Jason Summers	Libertarian	11,078	3.07	Write-ins		606	0.18
2018	Congress, 5th district	General	Steny Hoyer	Democratic	213,796	70.28	William Devine III	Republican	82,361	27.07	Patrick Elder	Green	4,082	1.34	Jacob Pulcher	Libertarian	3,592	1.18
2020	Congress, 5th district	General	Steny Hoyer	Democratic	274,210	68.75	Chris Palombi	Republican	123,525	30.97	Write-ins		1,104	0.28				
2022	Congress, 5th district	General	Steny Hoyer	Democratic	182,478	65.90	Chris Palombi	Republican	94,000	33.94	Write-ins		442	0.16				
2024	Congress, 5th district	General	Steny Hoyer	Democratic	283,619	67.75	Michelle Talkington	Republican	133,985	32.01	Write-ins		999	0.24				

== Personal life ==
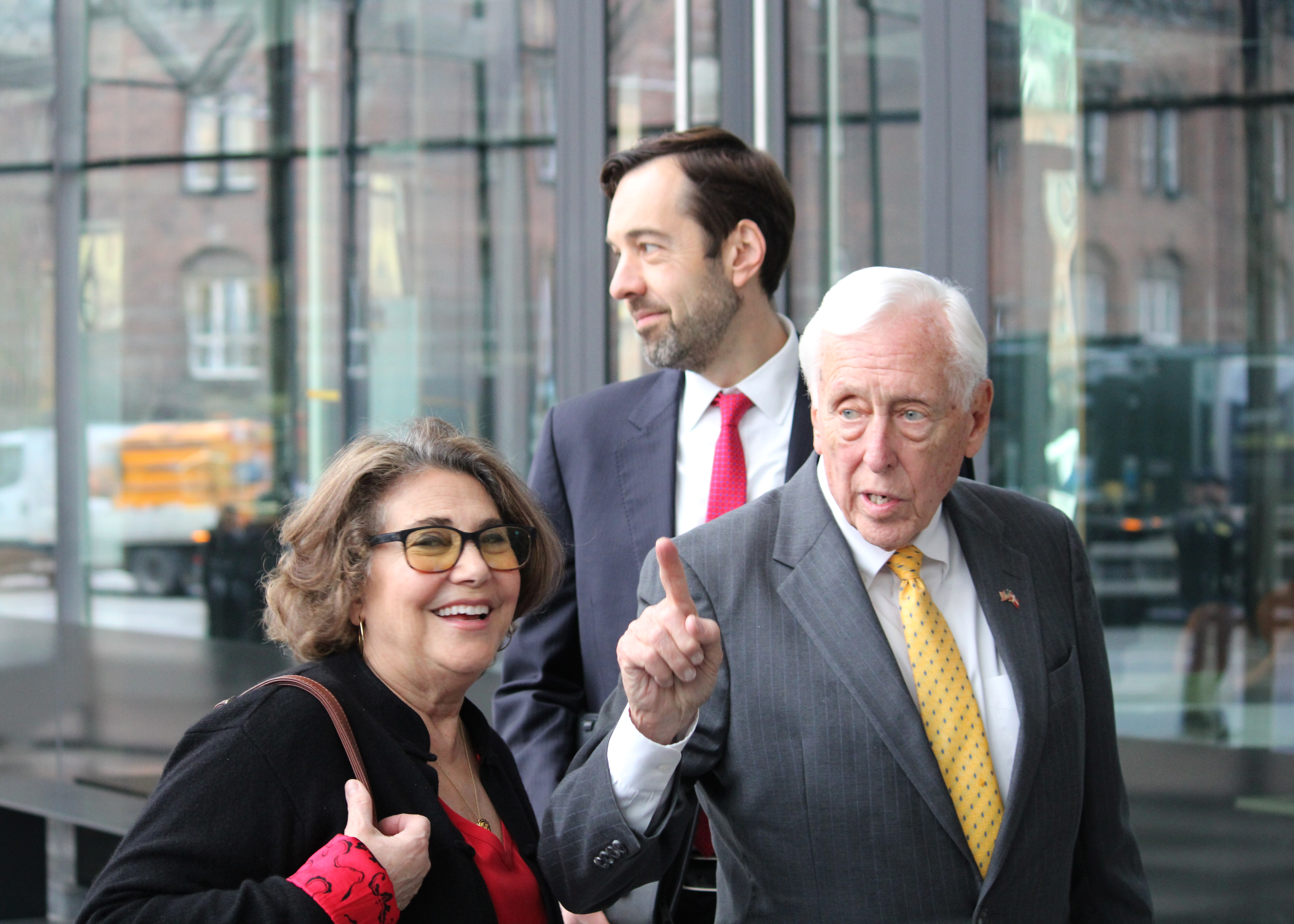
Hoyer with his wife Elaine Kamarck in Copenhagen, Denmark in support of the country during the Greenland crisis, January 2026

Hoyer has three daughters from his marriage to Judy Pickett Hoyer, who died of cancer in February 1997. In June 2012, after Hoyer announced his support of same-sex marriage, his daughter Stefany Hoyer Hemmer came out as a lesbian in an interview with the Washington Blade. A widower for 26 years, Hoyer married Elaine Kamarck, a Clinton administration official and the director of the Center for Effective Public Management at the Brookings Institution, in June 2023.

Judy Hoyer was an advocate of early childhood education, and child development learning centers in Maryland have been named in her honor ("Judy Centers"). She also suffered from epilepsy, and the Epilepsy Foundation of America sponsors an annual public lecture in her name. Steny Hoyer, too, has been an advocate for research in this area, and in 2002 the Epilepsy Foundation gave him its Congressional Leadership Award.

Hoyer serves on the board of trustees for St. Mary's College of Maryland and is a member of the board of the International Foundation for Electoral Systems, a nonprofit that supports international elections. He is also an Advisory Board Member for the Center for the Study of Democracy.

Hoyer is a member of a Baptist church.

On August 13, 2024, Hoyer suffered a mild stroke.

Political offices
Preceded by William S. James	President of the Maryland Senate; 1975–1978	Succeeded by James Clark Jr.
U.S. House of Representatives
Preceded by Gladys Spellman	Member of the U.S. House of Representatives from Maryland's 5th congressional district 1981–present	Incumbent
Preceded by Al D'Amato	Chair of the Joint Helsinki Commission; 1987–1989	Succeeded by Dennis DeConcini
Preceded by Dennis DeConcini	Chair of the Joint Helsinki Commission; 1991–1993	Succeeded by Dennis DeConcini
Preceded by Sam Gejdenson	Ranking Member of the House Administration Committee; 1999–2003	Succeeded by John B. Larson
Preceded by Nancy Pelosi	House Minority Whip; 2003–2007	Succeeded by Roy Blunt
Preceded by John Boehner	House Majority Leader; 2007–2011	Succeeded by Eric Cantor
Preceded by Eric Cantor	House Minority Whip; 2011–2019	Succeeded by Steve Scalise
Preceded by Kevin McCarthy	House Majority Leader; 2019–2023	Succeeded by Steve Scalise
Party political offices
Preceded by Mary Rose Oakar	Vice Chair of the House Democratic Conference; 1989	Succeeded by Vic Fazio
Preceded by William Gray	Chair of the House Democratic Conference; 1989–1995	Succeeded by Vic Fazio
Preceded by Nancy Pelosi	House Democratic Deputy Leader; 2003–2023	Succeeded by Katherine Clark
Honorary titles
Preceded by John Conyers	Most senior Democrat in the U.S. House of Representatives; 2017–present	Incumbent
U.S. order of precedence (ceremonial)
Preceded by Chris Smith	United States representatives by seniority 3rd	Succeeded by Marcy Kaptur
Preceded by Chris Smith	Order of precedence of the United States	Succeeded by Marcy Kaptur
