= Maryland House of Delegates District 29C =

American legislative district

Maryland's legislative district 29C
- Represents parts of Calvert County and St. Mary's County
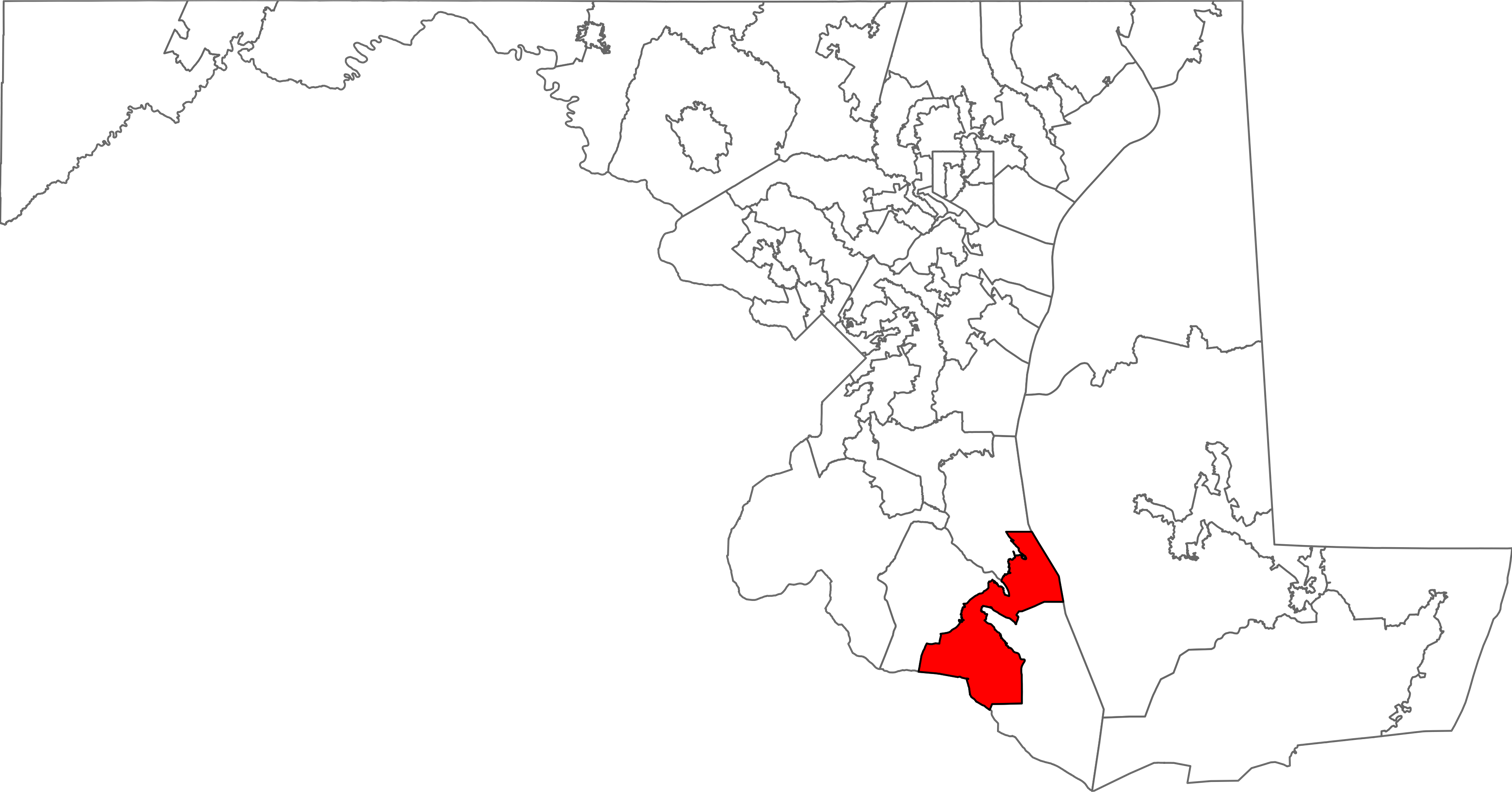
- Delegate(s): Todd Morgan (R)
- Registration: 42.9% Republican; 33.5% Democratic; 21.9% unaffiliated
- Demographics: 76.4% White; 10.7% Black/African American; 0.3% Native American; 2.7% Asian; 0.1% Hawaiian/Pacific Islander; 1.4% Other race; 8.3% Two or more races; 4.9% Hispanic
- Population (2020): 45,970
- Voting-age population: 34,881
- Registered voters: 32,182

Maryland House of Delegates District 29C is one of the 71 districts that compose the Maryland House of Delegates. Along with subdistricts 29A and 29B, it makes up the 29th district of the Maryland Senate. District 29C includes parts of Calvert County and St. Mary's County, and is represented by one delegate.

== Demographic characteristics ==
As of the 2020 United States census, the district had a population of 45,970, of whom 34,881 (75.9%) were of voting age. The racial makeup of the district was 35,140 (76.4%) White, 4,929 (10.7%) African American, 155 (0.3%) Native American, 1,234 (2.7%) Asian, 55 (0.1%) Pacific Islander, 663 (1.4%) from some other race, and 3,835 (8.3%) from two or more races. Hispanic or Latino of any race were 2,247 (4.9%) of the population.

The district had 32,182 registered voters as of October 17, 2020, of whom 7,062 (21.9%) were registered as unaffiliated, 13,803 (42.9%) were registered as Republicans, 10,776 (33.5%) were registered as Democrats, and 264 (0.8%) were registered to other parties.

== Past Election Results ==
=== 1998 ===
Name	Party	Votes	Percent	Outcome
Tony O'Donnell	Republican	8,401	59.0%	Won
John M. Gott	Democratic	5,772	41.0%	Lost

=== 2002 ===
Name	Party	Votes	Percent	Outcome
Tony O'Donnell	Republican	6,027	51.9%	Won
Pat Buehler	Democratic	5,586	48.1%	Lost
Other Write-Ins		6	0.1%	

=== 2006 ===
Name	Party	Votes	Percent	Outcome
Tony O'Donnell	Republican	7,739	60.3%	Won
Norma Powers	Democratic	5,091	39.6%	Lost
Other Write-Ins		11	0.1%	

=== 2010 ===
Name	Party	Votes	Percent	Outcome
Tony O'Donnell	Republican	8,009	56.8%	Won
Chris Davies	Democratic	5,610	39.8%	Lost
Shawn P. Quinn	Libertarian	474	3.4%	Lost
Other Write-Ins		11	0.1%	

=== 2014 ===
Name	Party	Votes	Percent	Outcome
Tony O'Donnell	Republican	9,924	68.5%	Won
Len Zuza	Democratic	4,548	31.4%	Lost
Other Write-Ins		19	0.1%	

=== 2018 ===
In the November 6, 2018 election, Clark was challenged by Democrat Julia Nichols. She launched her campaign on September 1, 2017 and won the nomination in the June 2018 Democratic primary. Nichols lost the election with 7,049 votes at 42.43% of the vote.

Name	Party	Votes	Percent	Outcome
Jerry Clark	Republican	10,087	57.0%	Won
Julia Margaret Nichols	Democratic	7,580	42.8%	Lost
Other Write-Ins		31	0.2%	

== List of delegates ==
Delegate	Party	Years	Electoral history	Notes
John F. Slade III	Democratic	1983–1994		
Tony O'Donnell	Republican	January 11, 1995 – July 31, 2016	Appointed by Governor Larry Hogan to the Maryland Public Service Commission in 2016.	
Jerry Clark	Republican	October 13, 2016 – present	Appointed by Governor Larry Hogan to finish O'Donnell's term in 2016.	
