= Deb Rey =

American politician

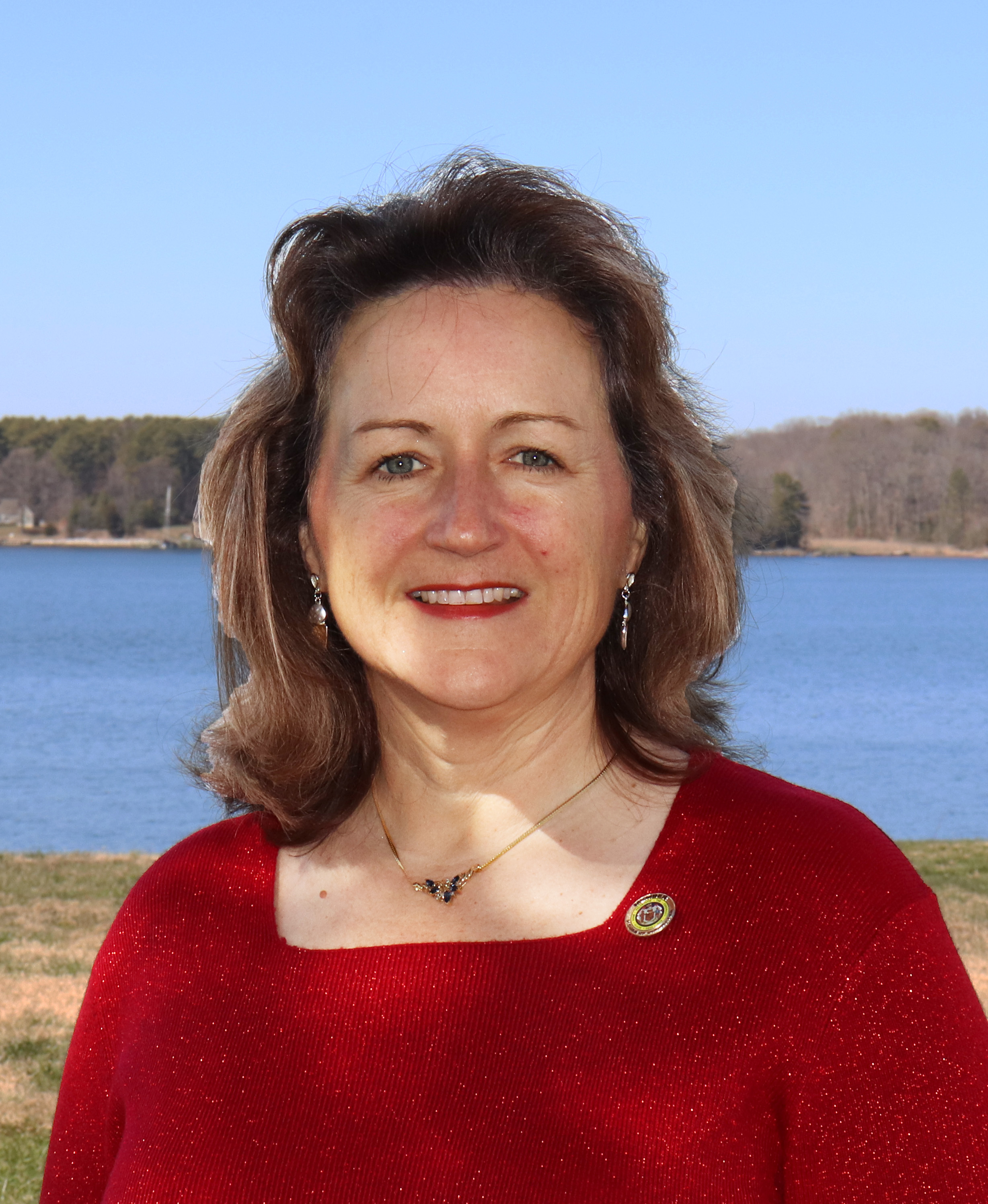

Member of the Maryland House of Delegates from the 29B district
- In office January 14, 2015 – January 9, 2019
- Preceded by: John L. Bohanan Jr.
- Succeeded by: Brian M. Crosby

Personal details
- Born: Deborah C. Rey; July 15, 1967 (age 59) St. Louis, Missouri
- Party: Republican
- Spouse: Jeff Lathrop
- Children: 2
- Education: Affton High School, Affton, Missouri; University of Missouri, B.A. (political science), 1989; Webster University, M.A. (management), 2004

Military service
- Allegiance: United States
- Branch/service: United States Air Force
- Years of service: 1989-2009
- Rank: Major

Deb Rey (born July 15, 1967) is a former American politician who represented District 29B in the Maryland House of Delegates from 2015 to 2019. In November 2018, she was unseated by Democratic challenger, and former Army Ranger, Brian Crosby.

== Early life, education, and early career ==
Rey attended Affton High School in Affton, Missouri. She graduated from University of Missouri with a B.S. in Political Science in 1989. She earned a M.S. in Management from Webster University in 2004.

Rey served in the United States Air Force from 1989 to 2009, achieving the rank of major (O-4). After retiring from the Air Force, she moved to St. Mary's County, Maryland. She was elected president of the Republican Women of St. Mary's County in 2010, and president of the Republican Club of St. Mary's County in 2012. She was selected as the St. Mary's County Republican Woman of the Year for 2013.

== Maryland House of Delegates ==
=== Elections ===
Rey was elected in 2014 to the Maryland House of Delegates from District 29B, which covers the southern part of St. Mary's County. She defeated John Bohanon by 76 votes.

Rey sought re-election in 2018, but was defeated by Brian M. Crosby by 942 votes. She again sought re-election in 2022, but was again defeated by Crosby.

=== Committee assignments, leadership positions and caucus memberships ===
- Judiciary Committee (2015–2019), Deputy Minority Whip (2018–2019)
- Juvenile law Subcommittee (2015–2019)
- Criminal Justice Subcommittee (2017–2019)
- Chair, St. Mary's County Delegation (2016–2019)
- Commissioner, Oyster Advisory Commission (2016–2019)
- Tri-County Council (2015–2019)
- Maryland Veterans Caucus (2015–2019)
- Maryland Military Installation Legislative Caucus (2017–2019)
- Women Legislators of Maryland (2015–2019)

== Personal life ==
Rey and her husband, Jeff Lathrop, have two children.
