= John L. Bohanan Jr. =

American politician

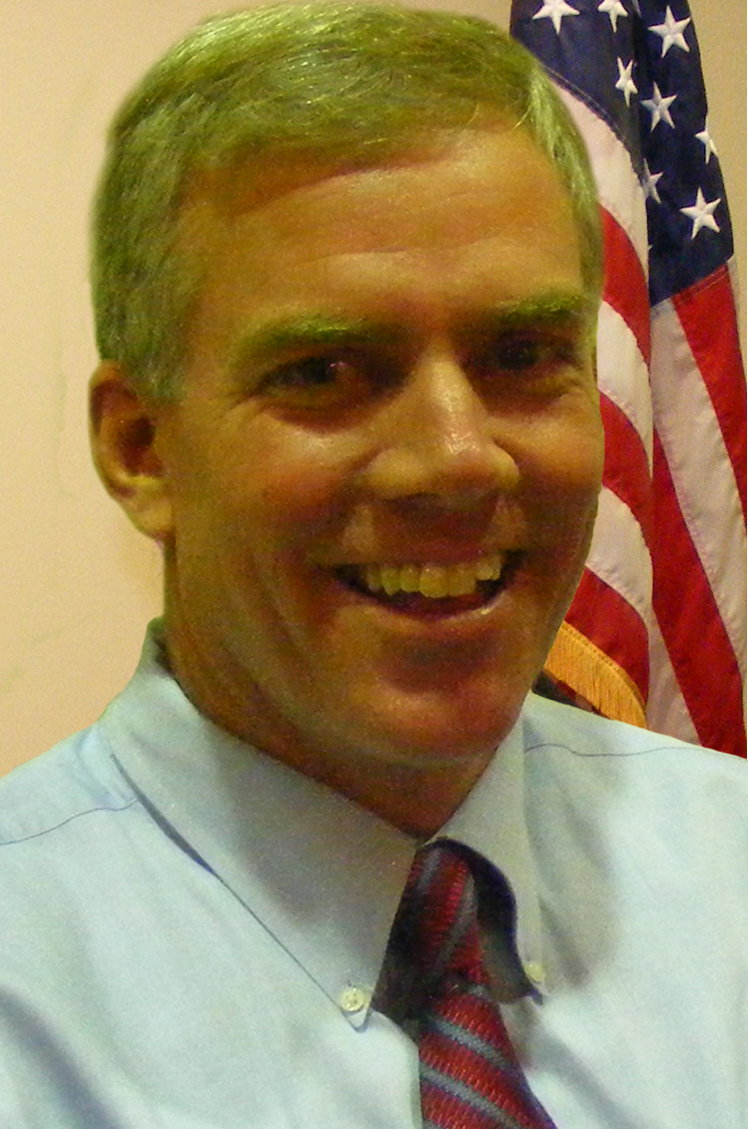

Member of the Maryland House of Delegates from the 29B district
- In office December 16, 1999 – January 14, 2015
- Preceded by: John F. Slade III
- Succeeded by: Deb Rey
- Constituency: St. Mary's County

Personal details
- Born: September 12, 1958 (age 67) St. Mary's County, Maryland, U.S.
- Party: Democratic
- Spouse: Mary K. Bohanan
- Education: Towson University (BS)

John L. Bohanan Jr. (born September 12, 1958) is an American politician who represented district 29B in the Maryland House of Delegates. Bohanan served as chairman of the House Spending Affordability Committee.

== Early life and career ==
Bohanan was born in St. Mary's County, Maryland on September 12, 1958.

He attended St. Mary's Ryken High School in Leonardtown, Maryland and later graduated from Towson University in 1981 with a Bachelor of Science degree in finance. He then served as a legislative assistant to U.S. Representative Roy Dyson from 1981 until 1987.

== In the legislature ==
While in the House of Delegates, Bohanan served as the Deputy Majority Whip for floor votes.

- voted against slots in 2005 (HB1361)
- voted for the Healthy Air Act in 2006(SB154)
- voted for the Clean Indoor Air Act of 2007 (HB359)
- voted for the Maryland Gang Prosecution Act of 2007 (HB713), subjecting gang members to up to 20 years in prison and/or a fine of up to $100,000
- voted for Jessica's Law (HB 930), eliminating parole for the most violent child sexual predators and creating a mandatory minimum sentence of 25 years in state prison, 2007
- voted for Public Safety – Statewide DNA Database System – Crimes of Violence and Burglary – Post conviction (HB 370), helping to give police officers and prosecutors greater resources to solve crimes and eliminating a backlog of 24,000 unanalyzed DNA samples, leading to 192 arrests, 2008
- voted for Vehicle Laws – Repeated Drunk and Drugged Driving Offenses – Suspension of License (HB 293), strengthening Maryland's drunk driving laws by imposing a mandatory one year license suspension for a person convicted of drunk driving more than once in five years, 2009
- voted for HB 102, creating the House Emergency Medical Services System Workgroup, leading to Maryland's budgeting of $52 million to fund three new Medevac helicopters to replace the State's aging fleet, 2009
- Voted against Gun control
- Voted Against abolishing the Death Penalty
- Voted for Raising the Minimal Wage
- Voted to Increase the Gas tax to 20 cents

== Awards ==
- 2010 Most Influential Maryland Legislators (Top 20)
