= Brian M. Crosby =

American politician (born 1982)

Brian Crosby
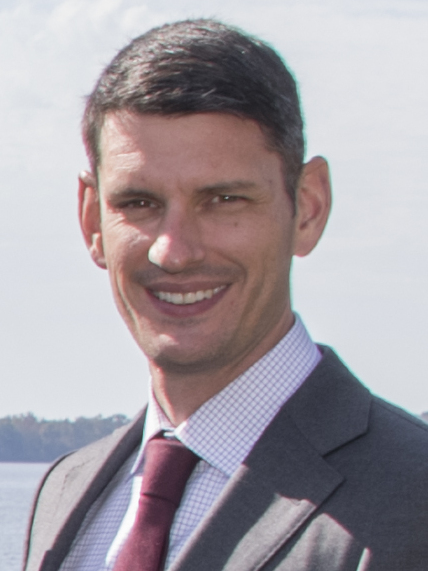

Member of the Maryland House of Delegates from the 29B district
- Incumbent
- Assumed office January 9, 2019
- Preceded by: Deb Rey

Personal details
- Born: Brian Michael Crosby; December 5, 1982 (age 43) Clifton Heights, Pennsylvania, U.S.
- Party: Democratic
- Education: Drexel University (BA); Western Michigan University (JD)

Military service
- Allegiance: United States
- Branch/service: United States Army
- Years of service: 2011–2015 (Army); 2016–2020 (National Guard)
- Rank: Captain
- Unit: Maryland Army National Guard
- Battles/wars: War in Afghanistan
- Awards: Bronze Star; Army Commendation Medals; Combat Infantryman Badge; Expert Infantryman Badge

Brian Michael Crosby (born December 5, 1982) is an American politician from the Democratic Party and is a member of the Maryland House of Delegates representing District 29B.

== Background ==
Crosby was born in Clifton Heights, Pennsylvania. He graduated from Monsignor Bonner High School in Drexel Hill, Pennsylvania in 2001. He attended Drexel University, where he received a B.A. in business administration. Crosby later attended Western Michigan University Cooley Law School where he received his J.D. and was admitted to the Pennsylvania Bar and New Jersey Bar in 2008. Starting in 2011, Crosby served in the U.S. Army after completing Officer Candidate School. While in the Army, he completed the Infantry Officer Leadership Course, Ranger School, and Airborne School and deployed to Afghanistan three times. He currently serves as a Captain in the Maryland Army National Guard.

In September 2017, Crosby announced his candidacy for the Maryland House of Delegates in District 29B, seeking to challenge incumbent Republican Delegate Deb Rey. He defeated Rey in the general election with 53 percent of the vote, or by a margin of about 700 votes.

== In the legislature ==
Crosby was sworn in as a member of the Maryland House of Delegates on January 9, 2019. He was a member of the Economic Matters Committee during his entire tenure, including as its vice chair from 2021 to 2025. He was also a member of the Rules and Executive Nominations Committee, the Southern Maryland Delegation, and the Maryland Legislative Transit Caucus.

In January 2026, Crosby announced that he would not run for re-election in 2026.

== Political positions ==
=== Education ===
Crosby supports the Blueprint for Maryland's Future, a sweeping education reform bill passed by the legislature during the 2020 legislative session that would provide schools with $3.8 billion a year for 10 years. He criticized a bill introduced that year that would allow teachers to carry guns in schools, later calling it the "dumbest policy in American history. Teachers sign up to teach. They don't sign up to go through combat trauma."

During the 2022 legislative session, Crosby voted for a bill that would prevent school boards from discriminating against people on the basis of race, ethnicity, color, religion, sex, age, national origin, marital status, sexual orientation, gender identity, or disability; the bill passed the House of Delegates by a vote of 94-36 and the Senate by a 34-13 vote, and became law without the governor's signature. During a debate on the bill, Crosby voted against an amendment that would have blocked public schools from discussing gender and sexuality in the classroom. The amendment failed by a 37-95 vote. He also voted against an amendment that would prohibit transgender students from competing on girls' sports team in schools, which was defeated in a 42-91 vote.

=== Elections ===
In September 2020, Crosby criticized the Maryland State Board of Elections for only having one early voting center in his county for the 2020 United States presidential election.

During the 2021 legislative session, Crosby introduced legislation that would require elections for county commissioners to only be decided by voters within the districts in which the candidate is running. The bill later passed the House of Delegates by a vote of 95-39. He also proposed legislation that would require buses on fixed routes to stop at early voting centers during elections, which passed the House of Delegates by a vote of 104-32.

=== Energy ===
Crosby supports expanding the Calvert Cliffs Nuclear Power Plant. During the 2026 legislative session, he introduced a bill that would prohibit investor-owned utilities from paying employee bonuses and supervisor compensation with ratepayer dollars.

=== Gun control ===
In 2020, Crosby voted in favor of legislation that would require additional background checks on secondary firearm transfers.

=== Marijuana ===
In 2019, Crosby said that he would support a ballot referendum on legalizing marijuana.

=== Policing ===
During the 2021 legislative session, Crosby introduced legislation that would require the Maryland Department of State Police to give body-worn cameras to all on-duty officers by 2022.

=== Social issues ===
During the 2020 legislative session, Crosby introduced legislation that would abolish daylight saving time in Maryland. The bill was reintroduced in the 2021 and 2022 legislative sessions.

During the 2022 legislative session, Crosby voted for a bill that would expand abortion access by providing $3.5 million to train nurse practitioners, physician assistants, and midwives to perform abortions in Maryland.

=== Taxes ===
During the 2022 legislative session, Crosby introduced legislation to exempt diapers from the state sales tax, and another bill to exempt baby bottles and infant car seats from the state's sales tax. Both bills passed unanimously and were signed into law on April 1, 2022.

During the 2025 legislative session, Crosby opposed the 3% tax on IT services proposed by Governor Wes Moore in the budget deal he negotiated with legislative leaders. Crosby announced on the House floor in March 2025 that he was in the process of moving his small business, which is a subcontractor on defense IT contracts, from Maryland to Virginia as a result of the new tax. He was one of two Democrats to vote against the tax. Crosby later clarified that his company's move to Virginia was purely strategic and logistical, and that he opposed the IT services tax because he thought it would disproportionately burden small and minority-owned subcontractors.

== Electoral history ==
Maryland House of Delegates District 29B Democratic Primary Election, 2018
Party	Candidate	Votes	%
Democratic	Brian M. Crosby	1,660	100.0

Maryland House of Delegates District 29B Election, 2018
Party	Candidate	Votes	%
Democratic	Brian M. Crosby	7,351	53.4
Republican	Deb Rey (incumbent)	6,409	46.5
Write-in		16	0.1

Maryland House of Delegates District 29B Election, 2022
Party	Candidate	Votes	%
Democratic	Brian M. Crosby (incumbent)	6,596	55.8
Republican	Deb Rey	5,210	44.1
Write-in		15	0.1
