= Tom Balanoff =

American labor leader

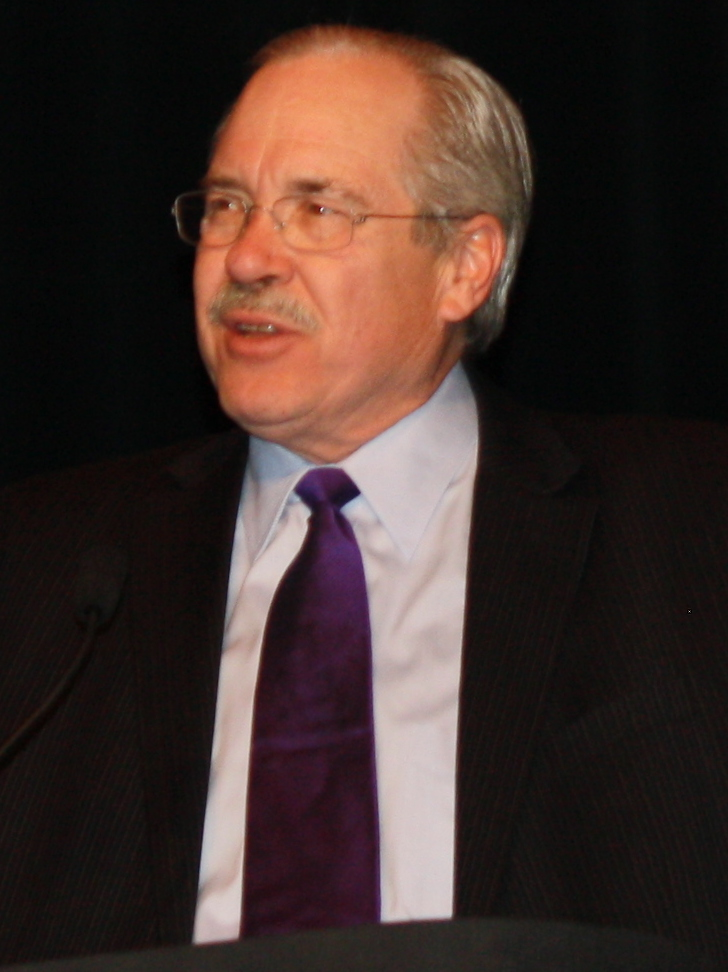
Balanoff in 2012

Tom Balanoff is the president of Service Employees International Union Illinois Council and the Vice President of its International Executive Board, as well as the President of SEIU Local 1 with 40,000 janitors and security guards. He comes from a family of labor union officials. His father, James Balanoff, Jr., was the president of the largest United Steelworkers local in the country which was Local 1010 based in East Chicago, Indiana. He received a Master's degree in Labor from the University of Illinois.

Balanoff gave a speech at the 2008 Democratic National Convention, supporting Barack Obama for President.

Balanoff is believed to be the unnamed "SEIU official" mentioned in the December 9, 2008 federal criminal complaint against Illinois Gov. Rod Blagojevich.

In 2018, J. B. Pritzker appointed Balanoff a member of the gubernatorial transition's Job Creation and Economic Opportunity Committee.
