= Tony O'Donnell (politician) =

American politician (born 1961)

Anthony J. O'Donnell
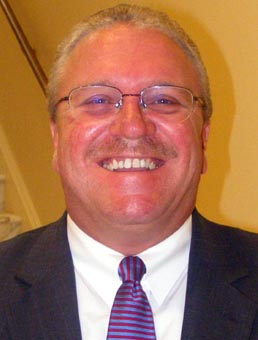

Minority Leader of the Maryland House of Delegates
- In office 2007 – May 1, 2013
- Preceded by: George C. Edwards
- Succeeded by: Nic Kipke

Member of the Maryland House of Delegates from the 29C district
- In office January 11, 1995 – July 31, 2016
- Succeeded by: Gerald W. Clark

Personal details
- Born: March 7, 1961 (age 65) Harrisburg, Pennsylvania, U.S.
- Party: Republican
- Education: Regents College (BS)

Tony O'Donnell (born March 7, 1961) is an American politician, who represented District 29C in the Maryland House of Delegates. In 2016, Governor Larry Hogan appointed him to the Maryland Public Service Commission. He retired from the commission in June 2024.

== Early life, education, and early career ==
O'Donnell attended Middletown Area High School in Middletown, Dauphin County, Pennsylvania. He graduated from Naval Nuclear Propulsion School in 1980. He received his B.S. from Regents College of the University of the State of New York (now Excelsior University) in 1985.

O'Donnell served in United States Navy, achieving a rank of E-6, from 1979-87. After the Navy, he was a supervisor for the Instrument Modifications Unit at Baltimore Gas & Electric's Calvert Cliffs Nuclear Power Plant. He received the Edward T. Hall Memorial Award for Outstanding Republican Man of the Year – Calvert County, Calvert County Republican Central Committee in 1993. In 2005, he received the Outstanding Employer Partner award from the Maryland Chamber of Commerce.

== Maryland House of Delegates ==
=== Elections ===
O'Donnell was first elected in 1995 into the Maryland House of Delegates for District 29C, which covers parts of Calvert and St. Mary's Counties. He defeated Thomas Michael Pelagatti by 32 votes. He was re-elected in 1998 (59%), 2002 (52%), 2006 (60%), and 2010 (57%).

=== Tenure ===
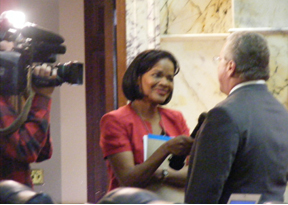
O'Donnell being interviewed during 2007 extraordinary session of the Maryland General Assembly

O'Donnell was Minority Whip in the Maryland House of Delegates from 2003 to 2006, and served as Minority Leader until 2013. In 2010, he was named one of the "Most Influential Maryland Legislators" (Top 20).

Voting Record

- voted against the Clean Indoor Air Act of 2007 (HB359)
- voted against in-state tuition for illegal immigrants in 2007 (HB6)
- voted against the Healthy Air Act in 2006 (SB154)
- voted for slots in 2005 (HB1361)
- voted for electric deregulation in 1999 (HB703)
- voted for income tax reduction in 1998 (SB750)

=== Committee assignments ===
- Environmental Matters Committee (2007–15)
  - Agriculture, agriculture preservation & open space subcommittee (2007–08)
  - Environment subcommittee (2007–10)
  - Natural resources subcommittee (2007–15)
  - Local government & bi-county agencies subcommittee (2008–09)
  - Land use & ethics subcommittee (2011–15)
- Rules and Executive Nominations Committee (2007–16)
- Legislative Policy Committee (2007-2013)
  - Management subcommittee (2007-2013)
- Judiciary Committee (1995-2004)
  - Family & juvenile law subcommittee (1995-2003)
  - Juvenile law subcommittee (2003–04)
- Special Committee on Higher Education Affordability and Accessibility (2003–04)
- Rules and Executive Nominations Committee (2003–04)
- Appropriations Committee (2004–06)
  - Health & human resources subcommittee (2005–06)
- Pensions Oversight Committee (2005–06)
- Joint Committee on the Selection of the State Treasurer (2007, 2011)

=== Caucus memberships ===
- Maryland Legislative Sportsmen's Caucus (2001-)
- Maryland Rural Caucus (2002-)
- Taxpayers Protection Caucus (2003-)
- Maryland Veterans Caucus (2011-)

== 2012 congressional election ==
In November 2011, O'Donnell announced his intention to run for the United States Congress representing Maryland's 5th congressional district currently held by Democratic incumbent Steny Hoyer. The 5th district spans from Anne Arundel, Calvert, Prince George's and Saint Mary's Counties.

== Personal life ==
Tony O'Donnell and his wife, Lori, have three children and two grandchildren.

== Electoral history ==
- 2006 Race for Maryland House of Delegates – District 26C

Voters to choose one:

Name	Votes	Percent	Outcome
Anthony J. O'Donnell, Rep.	7,739	60.3%	Won
Norma Powers, Dem.	5,091	39.6%	Lost
Other Write-Ins	11	0.1%	Lost

- 2002 Race for Maryland House of Delegates – District 27C

Voters to choose one:

Name	Votes	Percent	Outcome
Anthony J. O'Donnell, Rep.	6,027	51.87%	Won
Pat Buehler, Dem.	5,586	48.08%	Lost
Other Write-Ins	6	0.1%	Lost

- 1998 Race for Maryland House of Delegates – District 29C

Voters to choose one:

Name	Votes	Percent	Outcome
Anthony J. O'Donnell, Rep.	8,401	59%	Won
John M. Gott, Dem.	5,772	41%	Lost

- 1994 Race for Maryland House of Delegates – District 29C

Voters to choose one:

Name	Votes	Percent	Outcome
Anthony J. O'Donnell, Rep.	5,839	50%	Won
Thomas Michael Pelagatti, Dem.	5,807	50%	Lost
