= 2016–17 Drexel Dragons men's basketball team =

American college basketball season

2016–17 Drexel Dragons men's basketball
- Conference: Colonial Athletic Association
- Record: 9–23 (3–15 CAA)
- Head coach: Zach Spiker (1st season)
- Assistant coaches: Paul Fortier (1st season); Justin Jennings (1st season); Rob O'Driscoll (1st season)
- MVP: Rodney Williams
- Home arena: Daskalakis Athletic Center

2016–17 CAA men's basketball standings
	Conf.				Overall
Team	W		L	PCT	W		L	PCT
UNC Wilmington †	15	–	3	.833	29	–	6	.829
College of Charleston	14	–	4	.778	25	–	10	.714
Towson	11	–	7	.611	20	–	13	.606
Elon	10	–	8	.556	18	–	14	.563
William & Mary	10	–	8	.556	17	–	14	.548
Northeastern	8	–	10	.444	15	–	16	.484
Hofstra	7	–	11	.389	15	–	17	.469
James Madison	7	–	11	.389	10	–	23	.303
Delaware	5	–	13	.278	13	–	20	.394
Drexel	3	–	15	.167	9	–	23	.281
† 2017 CAA tournament winner

The 2016–17 Drexel Dragons men's basketball team represented Drexel University during the 2016–17 NCAA Division I men's basketball season. The Dragons, led by first year head coach Zach Spiker, played their home games at the Daskalakis Athletic Center in Philadelphia, Pennsylvania as members of the Colonial Athletic Association. They finished the season 9–23, 3–15 in CAA play to finish in last place. They lost in the first round of the CAA tournament to James Madison.

== Previous season ==
The 2015–16 Drexel Dragons finished the season with a record of 6–25 after losing to Hofstra in the 2016 CAA men's basketball tournament. The team went 3–15 in the CAA regular season, finishing 9th.

On March 7, 2016, after the end of the season, Bruiser Flint was fired as head basketball coach after 15 seasons with the team.

On March 24, 2016, Drexel announced that Zach Spiker was hired to replace Bruiser Flint as head coach.

== Off season ==
=== Departures ===
Name	Number	Pos.	Height	Weight	Year	Hometown	Notes
Ahmad Fields	1	G	6'5"	195	RS Sophomore	Philadelphia, PA	Career Ending Injury; Transferred to Cal State LA
Tavon Allen	11	G/F	6'7"	190	RS Senior	New Haven, CT	Graduated; Signed to BC Khimik
Terrell Allen	12	G	6'2"	180	Freshman	Upper Marlboro, MD	Transferred to UCF
Rashaan London	13	G	6'2"	185	Junior	Philadelphia, PA	Transferred to North Carolina Central
Kazembe Abif	32	F	6'7"	220	RS Senior	Elizabeth, NJ	Graduated; Signed to SC Rasta Vechta
Chandler Fraser-Pauls	33	G	6'0"	175	RS Senior	Pennington, NJ	Graduated; Hired as Director of Player Development at Rider

=== Incoming transfers ===
College recruiting information
Name	Hometown	School	Height	Weight	Commit date
Troy Harper; PG	Philadelphia, PA	Campbell	6 ft 7 in (2.01 m)	170 lb (77 kg)	Jun 12, 2016
Troy Harper; PG	Recruit ratings: ESPN: (69)				
Tramaine Isabell; SG	Seattle, WA	Missouri	6 ft 0 in (1.83 m)	178 lb (81 kg)	Jul 20, 2016
Tramaine Isabell; SG	Recruit ratings: Scout: 247Sports: ESPN: (70)				
Overall recruit ranking:
Note: In many cases, Scout, Rivals, 247Sports, On3, and ESPN may conflict in their listings of height and weight.; In these cases, the average was taken. ESPN grades are on a 100-point scale.; Sources: "Drexel 2016 Basketball Commitments". Rivals.; "Drexel Dragons". ESPN.; "2016 Team Ranking". Rivals.

- Troy Harper and Tramaine Isabell were not eligible to play in the 2016–17 season due to NCAA transfer rules. Both were redshirts for the season and entered the 2017–18 season as redshirt juniors with 2 years of eligibility remaining.

=== 2016 Recruiting Class ===
College recruiting information
Name	Hometown	School	Height	Weight	Commit date
Sam Green; SF	Forestville, MD	Bishop McNamara High School	6 ft 6 in (1.98 m)	200 lb (91 kg)	Aug 30, 2015
Sam Green; SF	Recruit ratings: Scout:				
Jeremy Peck; PF	Houston, TX	St. Thomas High School (TX)	N/A	245 lb (111 kg)	Oct 6, 2015
Jeremy Peck; PF	Recruit ratings: No ratings found				
Kurk Lee Jr; PG	Baltimore, MD	St. Frances (MD)	5 ft 9 in (1.75 m)	160 lb (73 kg)	May 2, 2016
Kurk Lee Jr; PG	Recruit ratings: ESPN: (57)				
Kári Jónsson; SG	Reykjavík, Iceland	Haukar Hafnarfjörður	6 ft 3 in (1.91 m)	170 lb (77 kg)	Jun 1, 2016
Kári Jónsson; SG	Recruit ratings: No ratings found				
Overall recruit ranking:
Note: In many cases, Scout, Rivals, 247Sports, On3, and ESPN may conflict in their listings of height and weight.; In these cases, the average was taken. ESPN grades are on a 100-point scale.; Sources: "Drexel 2016 Basketball Commitments". Rivals.; "Drexel Dragons". ESPN.; "2016 Team Ranking". Rivals.

=== Class of 2017 early commitments ===
College recruiting information (2017)
Name	Hometown	School	Height	Weight	Commit date
Jarvis Doles; PF	Columbia, MD	Mount Zion Preparatory School	6 ft 8 in (2.03 m)	N/A	Nov 16, 2016
Jarvis Doles; PF	Recruit ratings: No ratings found				
Tim Perry; PF	Cherry Hill, NJ	The Phelps School	6 ft 10 in (2.08 m)	220 lb (100 kg)	Jan 11, 2017
Tim Perry; PF	Recruit ratings: ESPN: (58)				
Overall recruit ranking:
Note: In many cases, Scout, Rivals, 247Sports, On3, and ESPN may conflict in their listings of height and weight.; In these cases, the average was taken. ESPN grades are on a 100-point scale.; Sources: "Drexel 2016 Basketball Commitments". Rivals.; "Drexel Dragons". ESPN.; "2017 Team Ranking". Rivals.

== Roster ==
2016–17 Drexel Dragons men's basketball team
Players
Coaches

Pos.	#	Name	Height	Weight	Year	Previous school	Hometown
G	0	Miles Overton	6 ft 4 in (1.93 m)	210 lb (95 kg)	RS Jr	Saint Joseph's Prep/Wake Forest	Philadelphia, PA
G	1	Kurk Lee Jr	5 ft 10 in (1.78 m)	150 lb (68 kg)	Fr	St. Frances (MD)	Baltimore, MD
G	2	Tramaine Isabell (I) (redshirt)	6 ft 1 in (1.85 m)	180 lb (82 kg)	Jr	Garfield HS (WA)/Missouri	Seattle, WA
G	3	Troy Harper (I) (redshirt)	6 ft 1 in (1.85 m)	170 lb (77 kg)	Jr	Neumann-Goretti HS/Campbell	Philadelphia, PA
F	4	Sam Green	6 ft 6 in (1.98 m)	230 lb (104 kg)	Fr	Bishop McNamara HS	Forestville, MD
F	5	Austin Williams	6 ft 8 in (2.03 m)	240 lb (109 kg)	Jr	Trinity Episcopal HS	Richmond, VA
G	12	Kári Jónsson	6 ft 3 in (1.91 m)	170 lb (77 kg)	Fr	Haukar Hafnarfjörður	Reykjavík, Iceland
G	14	Kris Alford (W)	6 ft 2 in (1.88 m)	185 lb (84 kg)	Fr	Valley Christian	Los Angeles, CA
G	15	Sammy Mojica	6 ft 3 in (1.91 m)	195 lb (88 kg)	Jr	Brimmer and May School	Chestnut Hill, MA
G	22	Elgin Ford, Jr. (W)	6 ft 1 in (1.85 m)	175 lb (79 kg)	Sr	Arabia Mountain	Lithonia, GA
F/C	23	Mohamed Bah	6 ft 9 in (2.06 m)	240 lb (109 kg)	Sr	Lee Academy (ME)	Bamako, Mali
F	24	Rodney Williams	6 ft 7 in (2.01 m)	225 lb (102 kg)	Sr	St. Christopher's School (VA)	Richmond, VA
G	25	Major Canady	6 ft 4 in (1.93 m)	215 lb (98 kg)	RS Jr	The Kiski School (PA)	Wilson, NC
G	30	John Moran (W)	6 ft 3 in (1.91 m)	185 lb (84 kg)	RS Sr	The Hill School/Richmond	Phoenixville, PA
F	34	Jeremy Peck	6 ft 8 in (2.03 m)	245 lb (111 kg)	Fr	St. Thomas HS	Houston, TX
F	35	Andrew Cartwright (W)	6 ft 6 in (1.98 m)	215 lb (98 kg)	So	Nokomis Regional HS	Guilford, ME
F	55	Tyshawn Myles	6 ft 8 in (2.03 m)	260 lb (118 kg)	Jr	Washington Heights	Queens, NY

Head coach

- Zach Spiker (Ithaca)

Assistant coach(es)

- Paul Fortier (Washington)
- Justin Jennings (Penn State Behrend)
- Rob O'Driscoll (Villanova)

Legend

- (C) Team captain
- (S) Suspended
- (I) Ineligible
- (W) Walk-on
- Injured
- Current redshirt

Roster
Last update: November 28, 2016

== Schedule and results ==
Date time, TV	Rank^{#}	Opponent^{#}	Result	Record	High points	High rebounds	High assists	Site (attendance) city, state
Exhibition
October 27, 2016*; 7:00 pm		Keiser	L 71–76	0–1	18 – Mojica	12 – R. Williams	5 – Lee	Daskalakis Athletic Center; Philadelphia, PA
Non-conference regular season
November 11, 2016*; 7:00 pm, ESPN3		at Monmouth	L 65–78	0–1	17 – Lee	10 – R. Williams	3 – Lee	OceanFirst Bank Center (3,738); West Long Branch, NJ
November 13, 2016*; 4:00 pm, BTN		at Rutgers; Scarlet Knight Showcase	L 66–87	0–2	24 – R. Williams	7 – Mojica	6 – Lee	Louis Brown Athletic Center (4,056); Piscataway, NJ
November 18, 2016*; 7:00 pm		Hartford; Scarlet Knight Showcase	W 87–73	1–2	24 – Lee	11 – A. Williams	3 – Lee	Daskalakis Athletic Center (2,025); Philadelphia, PA
November 20, 2016*; 2:00 pm		at North Texas; Scarlet Knight Showcase	W 83–62	2–2	20 – R. Williams	9 – Mojica	5 – R. Williams	Super Pit (1,457); Denton, TX
November 23, 2016*; 7:00 pm		at Niagara; Scarlet Knight Showcase	L 74–93	2–3	17 – Mojica	7 – A. Williams	7 – Lee	Gallagher Center (863); Lewiston, NY
November 27, 2016*; 4:00 pm		La Salle; City 6	L 78–89	2–4	21 – Lee	8 – Mojica	5 – Lee	Daskalakis Athletic Center (931); Philadelphia, PA
November 30, 2016*; 8:00 pm		at Lafayette	W 74–70	3–4	14 – Tied	7 – R. Williams	3 – Mojica	Kirby Sports Center (1,134); Easton, PA
December 3, 2016*; 7:00 pm		at High Point	W 78–72	4–4	25 – Jónsson	12 – A. Williams	8 – Lee	Millis Center (1,106); High Point, NC
December 11, 2016*; 6:00 pm		Saint Joseph's; City 6	L 71–72	4–5	29 – R. Williams	10 – R. Williams	6 – Lee	Daskalakis Athletic Center (1,252); Philadelphia, PA
December 16, 2016*; 7:00 pm		at Rider	L 82–90	4–6	23 – R. Williams	9 – A. Williams	4 – Lee	Alumni Gymnasium (1,531); Lawrenceville, NJ
December 18, 2016*; 4:30 pm		Kean	W 84–44	5–6	16 – Tied	11 – A. Williams	10 – Lee	Daskalakis Athletic Center (895); Philadelphia, PA
December 21, 2016*; 7:00 pm		at Quinnipiac	W 91–74	6–6	25 – R. Williams	12 – A. Williams	9 – Lee	TD Bank Sports Center (823); Hamden, CT
December 28, 2016*; 4:00 pm, TCN		at Penn; Battle of 33rd Street	L 67–75	6–7	19 – Overton	9 – Mojica	6 – Lee	Palestra (3,836); Philadelphia, PA
CAA regular season
December 31, 2016; 2:00 pm		at James Madison	L 67–78	6–8 (0–1)	14 – Overton	11 – R. Williams	4 – Overton	JMU Convocation Center (3,212); Harrisonburg, VA
January 2, 2017; 4:30 pm		Northeastern	L 70–75 ^{OT}	6–9 (0–2)	20 – R. Williams	9 – R. Williams	8 – Mojica	Daskalakis Athletic Center (899); Philadelphia, PA
January 5, 2017; 7:00 pm		UNC Wilmington	L 72–90	6–10 (0–3)	17 – R. Williams	11 – R. Williams	3 – Tied	Daskalakis Athletic Center (508); Philadelphia, PA
January 7, 2017; 4:00 pm		at William & Mary	Postponed to January 30 (Snow)					Kaplan Arena; Williamsburg, VA
January 12, 2017; 7:00 pm		at Northeastern	L 75–92	6–11 (0–4)	18 – Mojica	8 – A. Williams	5 – Lee	Matthews Arena (1,417); Boston, MA
January 14, 2017; 4:00 pm		Delaware	W 76–60	7–11 (1–4)	15 – R. Williams	15 – Mojica	10 – Mojica	Daskalakis Athletic Center (1,788); Philadelphia, PA
January 19, 2017; 7:00 pm		at Elon	L 73–93	7–12 (1–5)	15 – Tied	6 – R. Williams	4 – Jónsson	Alumni Gym (1,452); Elon, NC
January 21, 2017; 4:00 pm, TCN		at UNC Wilmington	L 74–87	7–13 (1–6)	15 – Mojica	10 – R. Williams	5 – Lee	Trask Coliseum (5,200); Wilmington, NC
January 26, 2017; 7:00 pm		Hofstra	W 81–80 ^{OT}	8–13 (2–6)	22 – R. Williams	8 – R. Williams	4 – Tied	Daskalakis Athletic Center (717); Philadelphia, PA
January 28, 2017; 2:00 pm, ASN		College of Charleston	L 76–90	8–14 (2–7)	17 – Jónsson	9 – A. Williams	6 – Lee	Daskalakis Athletic Center (1,602); Philadelphia, PA
January 30, 2017; 7:00 pm		at William & Mary; Rescheduled from January 7	L 85–108	8–15 (2–8)	25 – Lee	4 – Tied	8 – Lee	Kaplan Arena (1,895); Williamsburg, VA
February 2, 2017; 7:00 pm		at Towson	L 103–104 ^{2OT}	8–16 (2–9)	27 – R. Williams	16 – R. Williams	5 – Tied	SECU Arena (1,905); Towson, MD
February 4, 2017; 7:00 pm		at Hofstra	L 77–79	8–17 (2–10)	26 – R. Williams	8 – Tied	5 – Lee	Mack Sports Complex (2,819); Hempstead, NY
February 9, 2017; 7:00 pm		William & Mary	W 79–61	9–17 (3–10)	23 – Jónsson	8 – A. Williams	6 – Mojica	Daskalakis Athletic Center (533); Philadelphia, PA
February 11, 2017; 4:00 pm		Towson	L 65–69	9–18 (3–11)	18 – Lee	6 – Tied	5 – Lee	Daskalakis Athletic Center (1,009); Philadelphia, PA
February 16, 2017; 7:00 pm		at Delaware	L 67–68	9–19 (3–12)	21 – Lee	9 – Bah	4 – Tied	Bob Carpenter Center (2,248); Newark, DE
February 18, 2017; 2:00 pm		Elon	L 65–66	9–20 (3–13)	18 – Bah	12 – Bah	6 – Lee	Daskalakis Athletic Center (1,217); Philadelphia, PA
February 23, 2017; 7:00 pm		James Madison	L 64–70	9–21 (3–14)	18 – Tied	9 – Bah	3 – Tied	Daskalakis Athletic Center (858); Philadelphia, PA
February 25, 2017; 5:00 pm		at College of Charleston	L 67–80	9–22 (3–15)	13 – Lee	8 – Tied	3 – Lee	TD Arena (3,111); Charleston, SC
CAA Tournament
March 3, 2017; 8:30 pm	(10)	vs. (7) James Madison; First round	L 70–80	9–23	15 – Mojica	7 – R. Williams	7 – Lee	North Charleston Coliseum (1,889); North Charleston, SC
*Non-conference game. ^{#}Rankings from AP. (#) Tournament seedings in parentheses. All times are in Eastern Time.

== Team statistics ==
As of the end of the season.
Indicates team leader in each category.

(FG%, FT% leader = minimum 50 att.; 3P% leader = minimum 20 att.)

Player	GP	GS	MPG	PPG	RPG	APG	SPG	BPG	TPG	FG%	FT%	3P%
Kris Alford	5	0	3.6	0.6	0.6	0.2	0.2	0.0	0.4	.125	.000	.143
Mohamed Bah	24	5	12.6	4.3	3.7	0.3	0.2	0.2	0.7	.583	.588	.000
Major Canady	21	2	9.2	1.4	1.1	1.4	0.2	0.0	0.5	.250	.429	.227
Andrew Cartwright	4	0	2.5	0.8	0.3	0.0	0.0	0.0	0.0	.333	.000	.500
Elgin Ford	5	1	1.6	0.6	0.4	0.0	0.0	0.0	0.0	1.000	.000	1.000
Sam Green	14	0	6.8	2.4	0.7	0.4	0.0	0.1	0.2	.444	.000	.450
Kári Jónsson	28	21	28.5	10.1	2.3	2.0	1.0	0.1	1.4	.468	.829	.436
Kurk Lee	32	30	32.9	14.9	3.9	5.0	1.6	0.0	2.9	.415	.678	.400
Sammy Mojica	32	31	31.6	11.2	5.3	2.5	1.2	0.4	1.5	.388	.731	.312
John Moran	31	5	13.4	2.8	1.0	0.9	0.4	0.0	1.1	.275	.619	.316
Tyshawn Myles	25	0	12.4	2.2	2.8	0.2	0.0	0.3	0.3	.479	.476	.000
Miles Overton	22	6	23.8	9.5	2.0	1.6	0.9	0.1	2.1	.284	.763	.252
Jeremy Peck	19	0	6.4	1.6	1.6	0.0	0.1	0.1	0.2	.500	.778	.400
Austin Williams	31	27	21.8	7.1	6.3	0.5	0.4	1.2	1.5	.613	.480	.000
Rodney Williams	32	32	30.4	15.6	6.8	1.5	0.5	0.8	2.3	.526	.674	.231
Team	32	-	-	74.9	36.8	14.5	5.8	3.0	13.3	.435	.666	.345

== Awards ==
Rodney Williams

- Team Most Valuable Player
- "Sweep" Award (team leader in blocks)
- CAA All-Conference Third Team
- CAA All-Academic Team
- CAA Player of the Week
- Preseason CAA All-Conference Team Honorable Mention

Kurk Lee

- Assist Award (team leader in assists)
- CAA All-Rookie Team
- CAA Rookie of the Week (2)

Kári Jónsson

- Donald Shank Spirit & Dedication Award
- CAA Rookie of the Week

John Moran

- Team Academic Award
- CAA All-Academic Team

Austin Williams

- Dragon "D" Award (team's top defensive player)

Sam Green

- Samuel D. Cozen Award (most improved player)

== See also ==
- 2016–17 Drexel Dragons women's basketball team
