= 2016–17 Elon Phoenix women's basketball team =

Intercollegiate basketball season

2016–17 Elon Phoenix women's basketball

CAA tournament & regular season champions

NCAA tournament, First Round
- Conference: Colonial Athletic Association
- Record: 27–7 (16–2 CAA)
- Head coach: Charlotte Smith (6th season)
- Assistant coaches: Cristy McKinney; Josh Wick; Tasha Taylor
- Home arena: Alumni Gym

2016–17 CAA women's basketball standings
	Conf.				Overall
Team	W		L	PCT	W		L	PCT
Elon †	16	–	2	.889	27	–	7	.794
James Madison	15	–	3	.833	26	–	9	.743
Drexel	11	–	7	.611	22	–	11	.667
Delaware	10	–	8	.556	16	–	14	.533
William & Mary	9	–	9	.500	20	–	11	.645
Northeastern	8	–	10	.444	12	–	19	.387
College of Charleston	6	–	12	.333	9	–	21	.300
Hofstra	5	–	13	.278	13	–	18	.419
Towson	5	–	13	.278	12	–	18	.400
UNC Wilmington	5	–	13	.278	11	–	20	.355
† 2017 CAA tournament winner As of March 23, 2017; Rankings from AP poll

The 2016–17 Elon Phoenix women's basketball team represented Elon University during the 2016–17 NCAA Division I women's basketball season. The Phoenix, led by sixth-year head coach Charlotte Smith, played their home games at Alumni Gym and were third-year members of the Colonial Athletic Association (CAA). They finished the season 27–7, 16–2 in CAA play to win the CAA regular season title. They also won the CAA Tournament Championship for the first time in school history, and earned their first bid to the NCAA women's basketball tournament. They lost in the first round to West Virginia.

== Roster ==
2016–17 Elon Phoenix women's basketball team
Players
Coaches

Pos.	#	Name	Height	Year	Previous school	Hometown
G	2	Essence Baucom	5 ft 5 in (1.65 m)	RS Sr	Phillip O'Berry Academy; UAB	Charlotte, NC
G	3	Lauren Brown	5 ft 9 in (1.75 m)	Sr	Alpharetta	Alpharetta, GA
G	5	Shay Burnett	5 ft 9 in (1.75 m)	Jr	Southern Alamance	Graham, NC
G	10	Jada Graves	5 ft 9 in (1.75 m)	Fr	Thomas Edison	Alexandria, VA
F	11	Jenifer Rhodes	6 ft 0 in (1.83 m)	Sr	Pinewood Prep	North Charleston, SC
G	12	Lenaira Ruffin	5 ft 9 in (1.75 m)	Sr	River Mill	Burlington, NC
G	22	Lexi Mercer	5 ft 9 in (1.75 m)	Fr	Rosewood	Goldsboro, NC
G	24	Madison Wildson	5 ft 11 in (1.8 m)	Fr	Pepperell	Rome, GA
F	32	Meme Garner	6 ft 0 in (1.83 m)	RS Jr	Jordan-Matthews; Charlotte	Siler City, NC
G	33	Maddie MaCallie	5 ft 10 in (1.78 m)	RS Jr	Riverside; Miami (OH)	Durham, NC
C	34	Ra'Shika White	6 ft 5 in (1.96 m)	Fr	Phillip O'Berry Academy	Charlotte, NC
C	44	Malaya Johnson	6 ft 3 in (1.91 m)	Jr	North Surry	Mount Airy, NC

Head coach

- Charlotte Smith (North Carolina)

Assistant coach(es)

- Cristy McKinney (Western Carolina)
- Josh Wick (North Carolina)
- Tasha Taylor (Clemson)

Legend

- (C) Team captain
- (S) Suspended
- (I) Ineligible
- (W) Walk-on
- Injured
- Current redshirt

Roster

== Schedule ==
Date time, TV	Rank^{#}	Opponent^{#}	Result	Record	Site (attendance) city, state
Exhibition
11/08/2016*; 2:00 pm		Wingate	W 74–42		Alumni Gym; Elon, NC
Non-conference regular season
11/11/2016*; 8:00 pm, ESPN3		at Green Bay; Preseason WNIT first round	L 56–71	0–1	Kress Events Center (2,049); Green Bay, WI
11/15/2016*; 5:30 pm		Rutgers	W 66–54	1–1	Alumni Gym (983); Elon, NC
11/18/2016*; 4:30 pm		vs. Eastern Washington; Preseason WNIT consolation round	W 76–55	2–1	McGuirk Arena (100); Mount Pleasant, MI
11/19/2016*; 7:00 pm		at Central Michigan; Preseason WNIT consolation round	W 71–57	3–1	McGuirk Arena (454); Mount Pleasant, MI
11/22/2016*; 7:00 pm		Bucknell	W 64–58	4–1	Alumni Gym (533); Elon, NC
11/26/2016*; 2:00 pm		Wake Forest	L 68–78	4–2	Alumni Gym (716); Elon, NC
12/04/2016*; 6:00 pm, ACCN Extra		at North Carolina	L 73–78	4–3	Carmichael Arena (2,791); Chapel Hill, NC
12/08/2016*; 7:00 pm, ACCN Extra		at No. 21 Duke	L 61–68	4–4	Cameron Indoor Stadium (3,121); Durham, NC
12/17/2016*; 2:00 pm		at East Tennessee State	W 79–51	5–4	Freedom Hall Civic Center (567); Johnson City, TN
12/21/2016*; 1:00 pm		vs. Akron; GSU Holiday Classic	W 65–62	6–4	GSU Sports Arena (365); Atlanta, GA
12/22/2016*; 1:00 pm		at Georgia State; GSU Holiday Classic	W 84–67	7–4	GSU Sports Arena (433); Atlanta, GA
12/28/2016*; 5:30 pm		King	W 93–47	8–4	Alumni Gym (306); Elon, NC
CAA regular season
01/02/2017; 7:00 pm		College of Charleston	W 70–57	9–4 (1–0)	Alumni Gym (338); Elon, NC
01/06/2017; 7:00 pm		at Drexel	W 48–45	10–4 (2–0)	Daskalakis Athletic Center (520); Philadelphia, PA
01/08/2017; 2:00 pm		Delaware	W 69–42	11–4 (3–0)	Alumni Gym (303); Elon, NC
01/13/2017; 6:30 pm		at College of Charleston	W 84–56	12–4 (4–0)	TD Arena (520); Charleston, SC
01/15/2017; 3:00 pm, ASN		Drexel	W 75–65	13–4 (5–0)	Alumni Gym (1,054); Elon, NC
01/20/2017; 7:00 pm		James Madison	L 70–76	13–5 (5–1)	Alumni Gym (1,412); Elon, NC
01/22/2017; 2:00 pm		at William & Mary	W 60–58	14–5 (6–1)	Kaplan Arena (434); Williamsburg, VA
01/27/2017; 7:00 pm		at Northeastern	W 76–65	15–5 (7–1)	Cabot Center (327); Boston, MA
01/29/2017; 1:00 pm		at Hofstra	W 64–53	16–5 (8–1)	Hofstra Arena (387); Hempstead, NY
02/03/2017; 7:00 pm		Towson	W 83–55	17–5 (9–1)	Alumni Gym (628); Elon, NY
02/05/2017; 2:00 pm		at UNC Wilmington	W 66–56	18–5 (10–1)	Trask Coliseum (381); Wilmington, NC
02/10/2017; 7:00 pm		Northeastern	W 70–58	19–5 (11–1)	Alumni Gym (531); Elon, NC
02/12/2017; 7:00 pm, ASN		at James Madison	L 54–61	19–6 (11–2)	JMU Convocation Center (4,019); Williamsburg, VA
02/16/2017; 7:00 pm		Hofstra	W 72–61	20–6 (12–2)	Alumni Gym (617); Elon, NC
02/19/2017; 2:00 pm		William & Mary	W 70–47	21–6 (13–2)	Alumni Gym (831); Elon, NC
02/24/2017; 7:00 pm		at Delaware	W 57–48	22–6 (14–2)	Bob Carpenter Center (1,718); Newark, DE
02/26/2017; 2:00 pm		at Towson	W 67–65	23–6 (15–2)	SECU Arena (398); Towson, MD
03/01/2017; 7:00 pm		UNC Wilmington	W 82–48	24–6 (16–2)	Alumni Gym (1,234); Elon, NY
CAA Women's Tournament
03/09/2017; 12:00 pm		vs. Hofstra; Quarterfinals	W 78–50	25–6	JMU Convocation Center; Harrisonburg, VA
03/10/2017; 4:30 pm, CSN		vs. William & Mary; Semifinals	W 88–60	26–6	JMU Convocation Center; Harrisonburg, VA
03/11/2017; 7:00 pm, CSN		at James Madison; Championship Game	W 78–60	27–6	JMU Convocation Center; Harrisonburg, VA
NCAA Women's Tournament
03/17/2017*; 2:30 pm, ESPN2	(11 B)	vs. (6 B) No. 22 West Virginia; First Round	L 62–75	27–7	Xfinity Center (3,511); College Park, MD
*Non-conference game. ^{#}Rankings from AP Poll. (#) Tournament seedings in parentheses. B=Bridgeport Region. All times are in Eastern Time.

== Rankings ==
Regular season polls
Poll	Pre- season	Week 2	Week 3	Week 4	Week 5	Week 6	Week 7	Week 8	Week 9	Week 10	Week 11	Week 12	Week 13	Week 14	Week 15	Week 16	Week 17	Week 18	Week 19	Final
AP	NR	NR	NR	NR	NR	NR	NR	NR	NR	NR	NR	NR	NR	NR	NR	NR	NR	NR	NR	N/A
Coaches	NR	NR	NR	NR	NR	NR	NR	NR	NR	NR	NR	NR	NR	NR	NR	RV	RV	NR	RV	RV

Legend
	Increase in ranking
	Decrease in ranking
	No change
(RV)	Received votes

== See also ==
- 2016–17 Elon Phoenix men's basketball team
