= 2016–17 Towson Tigers women's basketball team =

Intercollegiate basketball season

2016–17 Towson Tigers women's basketball
- Conference: Colonial Athletic Association
- Record: 12–18 (5–13 CAA)
- Head coach: Niki Reid Geckeler (4th season)
- Associate head coach: Erin Dickerson
- Assistant coaches: Sidney Raikes; Brian Davis
- Home arena: SECU Arena

2016–17 CAA women's basketball standings
| | Conf. | | | | Overall |
| Team | W | | L | PCT | W | | L | PCT |
|---|---|---|---|---|---|---|---|---|
| Elon † | 16 | – | 2 | .889 | 27 | – | 7 | .794 |
| James Madison | 15 | – | 3 | .833 | 26 | – | 9 | .743 |
| Drexel | 11 | – | 7 | .611 | 22 | – | 11 | .667 |
| Delaware | 10 | – | 8 | .556 | 16 | – | 14 | .533 |
| William & Mary | 9 | – | 9 | .500 | 20 | – | 11 | .645 |
| Northeastern | 8 | – | 10 | .444 | 12 | – | 19 | .387 |
| College of Charleston | 6 | – | 12 | .333 | 9 | – | 21 | .300 |
| Hofstra | 5 | – | 13 | .278 | 13 | – | 18 | .419 |
| Towson | 5 | – | 13 | .278 | 12 | – | 18 | .400 |
| UNC Wilmington | 5 | – | 13 | .278 | 11 | – | 20 | .355 |
† 2017 CAA tournament winner As of March 23, 2017; Rankings from AP poll

The 2016–17 Towson Tigers women's basketball team represented Towson University during the 2016–17 NCAA Division I women's basketball season. The Tigers, led by fourth year head coach Niki Reid Geckeler, played their home games at SECU Arena and were members of the Colonial Athletic Association (CAA). They finished the season 12–18, 5–13 in CAA play to finish in a 3 way tie for eighth place. They lost in the first round of the CAA women's tournament to Hofstra.

== Roster ==
2016–17 Towson Tigers women's basketball team
Players
Coaches

| Pos. | # | Name | Height | Year | Previous school | Hometown |
|---|---|---|---|---|---|---|
| G/F | 1 | Nukiya Mayo | 6 ft 3 in (1.91 m) | Fr | Monsignor Scanlan H.S. | Bronx, NY |
| G | 3 | Sianni Martin | 5 ft 8 in (1.73 m) | So | Neumann Gorretti H.S. | Philadelphia, PA |
| G | 4 | Braysia Hicks | 5 ft 10 in (1.78 m) | Jr | Hampton Roads Academy | Yorktown, VA |
| F | 5 | Jordyn Smith | 6 ft 0 in (1.83 m) | RS Jr | Hillside H.S. | Durham, NC |
| G | 10 | Raine Bankston | 5 ft 10 in (1.78 m) | RS Jr | John Glenn H.S. Delaware State | Detroit, MI |
| G | 11 | Raven Bankston | 5 ft 10 in (1.78 m) | Sr | John Glenn H.S. Delaware State | Detroit, MI |
| G | 13 | Etalyia Vogt | 5 ft 6 in (1.68 m) | Fr | St. Anthony's H.S. | Long Island, NY |
| F | 14 | Brianna Bush | 6 ft 2 in (1.88 m) | Sr | Elizabeth Seton H.S. | District Heights, MD |
| G | 15 | Mariah Gray | 5 ft 7 in (1.7 m) | Fr | Good Counsel H.S. | Ellicott City, MD |
| G | 21 | A. J. Timbers | 6 ft 0 in (1.83 m) | So | Neumann Gorretti H.S. | Philadelphia, PA |
| F | 22 | Mary Cuevas | 6 ft 4 in (1.93 m) | Jr | CD Cref H.S. ASA College | Madrid, Spain |
| F | 23 | Brittany Tarr | 6 ft 0 in (1.83 m) | So | Sevier County H.S. | Sevierville, TN |
| C | 25 | Maia Lee | 6 ft 4 in (1.93 m) | RS So | McLean; Old Dominion | McLean, VA |
| G | 32 | Shanea Butler | 5 ft 10 in (1.78 m) | Jr | Westlake H.S. | Waldorf, MD |
| C | 33 | Daijha Thomas | 6 ft 4 in (1.93 m) | Jr | Calvert H.S. | St. Leonard, MD |

Head coach

- Niki Reid Geckeler (Georgetown)

Assistant coach(es)

- Erin Dickerson (Northwestern)
- Sidney Raikes (Coppin State)
- Brian Davis (Tennessee Tech)

Legend

- (C) Team captain
- (S) Suspended
- (I) Ineligible
- (W) Walk-on
- Injured
- Current redshirt

Roster

== Schedule ==
| Date time, TV | Rank^{#} | Opponent^{#} | Result | Record | Site (attendance) city, state |
Non-conference regular season
| 11/11/2016*; 7:00 pm | | UMass Lowell | W 90–56 | 1–0 | SECU Arena (350); Towson, MD |
| 11/17/2016*; 7:00 pm | | at Wagner | W 69–40 | 2–0 | Spiro Sports Center (323); Staten Island, NY |
| 11/19/2016*; 12:00 pm | | Cornell | W 68–63 | 3–0 | SECU Arena (263); Towson, MD |
| 11/22/2016*; 7:00 pm | | at UMBC | W 59–48 | 4–0 | Retriever Activities Center (382); Catonsville, MD |
| 11/27/2016*; 2:00 pm | | George Mason | W 79–75 | 5–0 | SECU Arena (278); Towson, MD |
| 11/30/2016*; 12:00 pm | | Georgetown | L 59–75 | 5–1 | SECU Arena (1,357); Towson, MD |
| 12/03/2016*; 5:30 pm | | Coppin State | W 69–65 | 6–1 | SECU Arena (332); Towson, MD |
| 12/06/2016*; 7:00 pm | | at No. 4 Maryland | L 63–97 | 6–2 | Xfinity Center (1,343); College Park, MD |
| 12/08/2016*; 7:00 pm | | at Colgate | L 71–76 | 6–3 | Cotterell Court (472); Hamilton, NY |
| 12/11/2016*; 2:00 pm | | Rider | L 75–79 | 6–4 | SECU Arena (307); Towson, MD |
| 12/29/2016*; 7:00 pm | | Norfolk State | W 61–58 | 7–4 | SECU Arena (330); Towson, MD |
CAA regular season
| 01/02/2017; 2:00 pm | | at Drexel | L 48–58 | 7–5 (0–1) | Daskalakis Athletic Center; Philadelphia, PA |
| 01/06/2017; 7:00 pm | | at Northeastern | L 64–72 | 7–6 (0–2) | Cabot Center (222); Boston, MA |
| 01/08/2017; 2:00 pm | | James Madison | W 54–51 | 8–6 (1–2) | SECU Arena (454); Towson, MD |
| 01/13/2017; 7:00 pm | | Hofstra | L 61–70 | 8–7 (1–3) | SECU Arena (192); Towson, MD |
| 01/15/2017; 2:00 pm | | College of Charleston | W 61–59 | 9–7 (2–3) | SECU Arena (257); Towson, MD |
| 01/20/2017; 7:00 pm | | William & Mary | W 64–60 | 10–7 (3–3) | SECU Arena (167); Towson, MD |
| 01/22/2017; 2:00 pm | | at James Madison | W 60–55 | 10–8 (4–3) | JMU Convocation Center (4,135); Harrisonburg, VA |
| 01/27/2017; 7:00 pm | | at UNC Wilmington | L 56–59 | 11–8 (4–4) | Trask Coliseum (568); Wilmington, NC |
| 01/29/2017; 2:00 pm | | Delaware | L 67–73 | 11–9 (4–5) | SECU Arena (202); Towson, MD |
| 02/03/2017; 7:00 pm | | at Elon | L 55–83 | 11–10 (4–6) | Alumni Gym (628); Elon, NC |
| 02/05/2017; 2:00 pm | | at College of Charleston | L 54–59 | 11–11 (4–7) | TD Arena (604); Charleston, SC |
| 02/10/2017; 7:00 pm | | UNC Wilmington | L 42–48 | 11–12 (4–8) | SECU Arena (445); Towson, MD |
| 02/12/2017; 2:00 pm | | at William & Mary | L 55–68 | 11–13 (4–9) | Kaplan Arena (418); Williamsburg, VA |
| 02/17/2017; 7:00 pm | | Drexel | L 65–80 | 11–14 (4–10) | SECU Arena (387); Towson, MD |
| 02/19/2017; 2:00 pm | | Northeastern | L 51–63 | 11–15 (4–11) | SECU Arena (234); Towson, MD |
| 02/24/2017; 7:00 pm | | at Hofstra | W 59–56 | 12–15 (5–11) | Hofstra Arena (309); Hempstead, NY |
| 02/26/2017; 2:00 pm | | Elon | L 65–67 | 12–16 (5–12) | SECU Arena (398); Towson, MD |
| 03/01/2017; 7:00 pm | | at Delaware | L 59–75 | 12–17 (5–13) | Bob Carpenter Center (1,496); Newark, DE |
CAA Tournament
| 03/08/2017; 12:00 pm | | vs. Hofstra; First Round | L 66–77 | 12–18 | JMU Convocation Center (1,123); Harrisonburg, VA |
*Non-conference game. ^{#}Rankings from AP Poll. (#) Tournament seedings in parentheses. All times are in Eastern Time.

== See also ==
2016–17 Towson Tigers men's basketball team
