= 2016–17 UNC Wilmington Seahawks women's basketball team =

Intercollegiate basketball season

2016–17 UNC Wilmington Seahawks women's basketball
- Conference: Colonial Athletic Association
- Record: 11–20 (5–13 CAA)
- Head coach: Adell Harris (5th season)
- Assistant coaches: Richard Moore; Kim Tingley; Crystal Riley
- Home arena: Trask Coliseum

2016–17 CAA women's basketball standings
	Conf.				Overall
Team	W		L	PCT	W		L	PCT
Elon †	16	–	2	.889	27	–	7	.794
James Madison	15	–	3	.833	26	–	9	.743
Drexel	11	–	7	.611	22	–	11	.667
Delaware	10	–	8	.556	16	–	14	.533
William & Mary	9	–	9	.500	20	–	11	.645
Northeastern	8	–	10	.444	12	–	19	.387
College of Charleston	6	–	12	.333	9	–	21	.300
Hofstra	5	–	13	.278	13	–	18	.419
Towson	5	–	13	.278	12	–	18	.400
UNC Wilmington	5	–	13	.278	11	–	20	.355
† 2017 CAA tournament winner As of March 23, 2017; Rankings from AP poll

The 2016–17 UNC Wilmington Seahawks women's basketball team represented the University of North Carolina Wilmington during the 2016–17 NCAA Division I women's basketball season. The Seahawks, led by fifth-year head coach Adell Harris, played their home games at Trask Coliseum and were members of the Colonial Athletic Association (CAA). They finished the season with an 11–20 record, going 5–13 in CAA play, which placed them in a three-way tie for eight place. They advanced to the quarterfinals of the CAA women's tournament where they lost to James Madison.

== Roster ==
2016–17 UNC Wilmington Seahawks women's basketball team
Players
Coaches

Pos.	#	Name	Height	Year	Previous school	Hometown
G	2	Moriah Crisp	5 ft 2 in (1.57 m)	Fr	Bishop McNamara	Waldorf, MD
G	3	Katelyn Weems	5 ft 9 in (1.75 m)	Fr	North Greene	Chuckey, TN
G	10	Madison Raque	5 ft 8 in (1.73 m)	Jr	Eastern	Louisville, KY
G	11	Jasmine Steele	5 ft 1 in (1.55 m)	RS Sr	Midfield; Alabama	Birmingham, AL
F	12	Janeá Williams	6 ft 3 in (1.91 m)	RS Jr	Pinecrest; North Florida	Pinehurst, NC
G	13	Lacey Suggs	5 ft 10 in (1.78 m)	Fr	East Bladen	White Lake, NC
G	14	Timber Tate	5 ft 11 in (1.8 m)	Fr	Forest Trail Academy	Thomasville, NC
G	15	Seara Clayborn	5 ft 8 in (1.73 m)	Jr	Evanston Township; State Fair CC	Chicago, IL
F	20	Jordan Henry	6 ft 3 in (1.91 m)	RS Sr	Marvin Ridge; Iona	Waxhaw, NC
F	21	Jenny DeGraaf	6 ft 1 in (1.85 m)	RS Jr	Springboro; Penn State	Springboro, OH
G	22	Amber Reeves	5 ft 9 in (1.75 m)	Sr	North Cobb	Mariette, GA
G	24	Emily Thomas	5 ft 6 in (1.68 m)	So	Pickerington North	Pickerington, OH
C	32	Rebekah Banks	6 ft 1 in (1.85 m)	Jr	Cary Academy	Durham, NC
G	34	Sierra Clayborn	5 ft 8 in (1.73 m)	Jr	Evanston Township; State Fair CC	Chicago, IL

Head coach

- Adell Harris (Wake Forest)

Assistant coach(es)

- Richard Moore (Fairleigh Dickinson)
- Kim Tingley (Delaware)
- Crystal Riley (Kentucky)

Legend

- (C) Team captain
- (S) Suspended
- (I) Ineligible
- (W) Walk-on
- Injured
- Current redshirt

Roster

== Schedule ==
Date time, TV	Rank^{#}	Opponent^{#}	Result	Record	Site (attendance) city, state
Non-conference regular season
11/11/2016*; 4:30 pm		Norfolk State	W 64–56	1–0	Trask Coliseum (813); Wilmington, NC
11/16/2016*; 11:30 am		at East Carolina	L 65–75	1–1	Williams Arena (4,958); Greenville, NC
11/20/2016*; 2:00 pm		at Georgia State	W 72–66	2–1	GSU Sports Arena (472); Atlanta, GA
11/26/2016*; 2:00 pm		Providence; UNCW Hampton Inn Thanksgiving Classic	L 49–65	2–2	Trask Coliseum (428); Wilmington, NC
11/27/2015*; 2:00 pm		La Salle; UNCW Hampton Inn Thanksgiving Classic	L 48–64	2–3	Trask Coliseum (397); Wilmington, NC
11/30/2016*; 7:00 pm		at Davidson	W 67–58	3–3	John M. Belk Arena (316); Davidson, NC
12/11/2016*; 2:00 pm, ACCN Extra		at NC State	L 54–86	3–4	Reynolds Coliseum (2,093); Raleigh, NC
12/15/2016*; 11:30 am		Furman	W 56–52	4–4	Trask Coliseum (4,516); Wilmington, NC
12/17/2016*; 4:30 pm		Wofford	L 67–71	4–5	Trask Coliseum (516); Wilmington, NC
12/19/2016*; 7:00 pm		Catawba	W 91–65	5–5	Trask Coliseum (388); Wilmington, NC
12/29/2016*; 7:00 pm		at Tennessee	L 54–90	5–6	Thompson–Boling Arena (9,109); Knoxville, TN
CAA regular season
01/02/2017; 2:00 pm		at James Madison	L 51–73	5–7 (0–1)	JMU Conovcation Center (2,139); Harrisonburg, VA
01/06/2017; 11:30 am		Delaware	L 52–63	5–8 (0–2)	Trask Coliseum (3,207); Wilmington, NC
01/08/2017; 2:00 pm		at College of Charleston	L 37–76 (Note: An investigation by the CAA revealed that Charleston had supplied improperly sized basketballs in this game, as well as the Cougars' home game against William & Mary. The CAA ruled that these games would be treated as Charleston losses for tournament seeding purposes, though counting as Charleston wins for all other purposes.)	5–9 (0–3)	TD Arena (303); Charleston, SC
01/13/2017; 7:00 pm		Drexel	L 38–71	5–10 (0–4)	Trask Coliseum (551); Wilmington, NC
01/15/2017; 2:00 pm		William & Mary	L 43–57	5–11 (0–5)	Trask Coliseum (451); Wilmington, NC
01/20/2017; 12:00 pm		at Hofstra	W 56–54 ^{OT}	6–11 (1–5)	Hofstra Arena (1,955); Hempstead, NY
01/22/2017; 2:00 pm		at Northeastern	L 47–55	6–12 (1–6)	Cabot Center (210); Boston, MA
01/27/2017; 7:00 pm		Towson	W 59–56	7–12 (2–6)	Trask Coliseum (568); Wilmington, NC
01/29/2017; 2:00 pm		College of Charleston	W 67–61	8–12 (3–6)	Trask Coliseum (337); Wilmington, NC
02/03/2017; 7:00 pm		at Delaware	L 40–57	8–13 (3–7)	Bob Carpenter Center (1,326); Newark, DE
02/05/2017; 2:00 pm		Elon	L 56–66	8–14 (3–8)	Trask Coliseum (381); Wilmington, NC
02/10/2017; 7:00 pm		at Towson	W 68–55	9–14 (4–8)	SECU Arena (418); Towson, MD
02/12/2017; 1:00 pm		at Drexel	L 51–76	9–15 (4–9)	Daskalakis Athletic Center (505); Philadelphia, PA
02/17/2017; 7:00 pm		James Madison	L 59–70	9–16 (4–10)	Trask Coliseum (641); Wilmington, NC
02/19/2017; 1:00 pm		Hofstra	L 54–66	9–17 (4–11)	Trask Coliseum (537); Wilmington, NC
02/24/2017; 7:00 pm		at William & Mary	L 52–58	9–18 (4–12)	Kaplan Arena (463); Williamsburg, VA
02/26/2017; 2:00 pm		Northeastern	W 68–63	10–18 (5–12)	Trask Coliseum (623); Wilmington, NC
03/01/2017; 7:00 pm		at Elon	L 48–82	10–19 (5–13)	Alumni Gym (1,234); Elon, NC
CAA Women's Tournament
03/08/2017; 2:30 pm		vs. College of Charleston; First Round	W 49–44	11–19	JMU Convocation Center (1,123); Harrisonburg, VA
03/09/2017; 5:00 pm		vs. James Madison; Quarterfinals	L 27–52	11–20	JMU Convocation Center; Harrisonburg, VA
*Non-conference game. ^{#}Rankings from AP Poll. (#) Tournament seedings in parentheses. All times are in Eastern Time.

== See also ==
- 2016–17 UNC Wilmington Seahawks men's basketball team
