= 2016–17 William & Mary Tribe women's basketball team =

Intercollegiate basketball season

2016–17 William & Mary Tribe women's basketball
- Conference: Colonial Athletic Association
- Record: 20–11 (9–9 CAA)
- Head coach: Ed Swanson (4th season)
- Assistant coaches: Millette Green; Lynne-Ann Kokoski; Sarah Eichler
- Home arena: Kaplan Arena

2016–17 CAA women's basketball standings
	Conf.				Overall
Team	W		L	PCT	W		L	PCT
Elon †	16	–	2	.889	27	–	7	.794
James Madison	15	–	3	.833	26	–	9	.743
Drexel	11	–	7	.611	22	–	11	.667
Delaware	10	–	8	.556	16	–	14	.533
William & Mary	9	–	9	.500	20	–	11	.645
Northeastern	8	–	10	.444	12	–	19	.387
College of Charleston	6	–	12	.333	9	–	21	.300
Hofstra	5	–	13	.278	13	–	18	.419
Towson	5	–	13	.278	12	–	18	.400
UNC Wilmington	5	–	13	.278	11	–	20	.355
† 2017 CAA tournament winner As of March 23, 2017; Rankings from AP poll

The 2016–17 William & Mary Tribe women's basketball team represented The College of William & Mary during the 2016–17 NCAA Division I women's basketball season. The Tribe, led by fourth year head coach Ed Swanson, played their home games at Kaplan Arena and were members of the Colonial Athletic Association (CAA). They finished the season 20–11, 9–9 in CAA play to finish in fifth place, although they were seeded fourth in the CAA women's tournament. (Note: An investigation by the CAA revealed that Charleston had supplied improperly sized basketballs in their home wins over W&M and UNCW. The CAA ruled that these games would be treated as Charleston losses for tournament seeding purposes. This gave W&M a 10–8 record for seeding purposes, putting them into a fourth-place tie with Delaware in which W&M held the tiebreaker.) They advanced to the quarterfinals of the CAA tournament, losing there to Elon. Despite having 20 wins, they were not invited to a postseason tournament.

== Roster ==
2016–17 William & Mary Tribe women's basketball team
Players
Coaches

Pos.	#	Name	Height	Year	Previous school	Hometown
G	1	Latrice Hunter	5 ft 5 in (1.65 m)	Sr	Norfolk Christian	Norfolk, VA
G	2	Bianca Boggs	5 ft 8 in (1.73 m)	So	St. Mary's Ryken	Waldolf, MD
F	3	Kasey Curtis	6 ft 2 in (1.88 m)	Sr	Paul VI	Manassas, VA
G/F	4	Jeanne Gaumont	6 ft 0 in (1.83 m)	Jr	Champlain College Saint-Lambert	Saint-Lambert, QE
G/F	5	Misha Jones	5 ft 9 in (1.75 m)	So	Battlefield	Manassas Park, VA
G	10	Nari Garner	5 ft 7 in (1.7 m)	Fr	Freedom	Tampa, FL
F	11	Alexandra Masaquel	5 ft 10 in (1.78 m)	Sr	ʻIolani School	Honolulu, HI
F	12	Jenna Green	5 ft 7 in (1.7 m)	Jr	Centerville	Clifton, VA
G	13	Marlena Tremba	5 ft 9 in (1.75 m)	Sr	Paul VI	Vienna, VA
C	20	Chandler Smith	6 ft 3 in (1.91 m)	So	St. Mary's Ryken	Port Tobacco, MD
G	23	Ashley Taylor	6 ft 0 in (1.83 m)	Fr	St. Anne's-Belfield	Charlottesville, VA
C	24	Abby Rendle	6 ft 4 in (1.93 m)	So	South Lakes	Reston, VA
F	30	Victoria Reynolds	5 ft 10 in (1.78 m)	Fr	Archbishop Spalding	Pasadena, MD
F	42	Ali Engelhardt	6 ft 1 in (1.85 m)	Fr	Mt. Carmel	San Diego, CA

Head coach

- Ed Swanson (Sacred Heart)

Assistant coach(es)

- Millette Green (UMBC)
- Lynne-Ann Kokoski (Bryant)
- Sarah Eichler (Green Bay)

Legend

- (C) Team captain
- (S) Suspended
- (I) Ineligible
- (W) Walk-on
- Injured
- Current redshirt

Roster

== Schedule ==
Date time, TV	Rank^{#}	Opponent^{#}	Result	Record	Site (attendance) city, state
Non-conference regular season
11/11/2016*; 2:00 p.m.		St. John's	L 57–73	0–1	Kaplan Arena (471); Williamsburg, VA
11/18/2016*; 7:00 p.m.		Richmond	W 67–39	1–1	Kaplan Arena (467); Williamsburg, VA
11/20/2016*; 2:00 p.m.		at Old Dominion; Rivalry	W 68–59	2–1	Ted Constant Convocation Center (1,089); Norfolk, VA
11/22/2016*; 7:00 p.m.		at USC Upstate	W 49–46	3–1	G. B. Hodge Center (201); Spartanburg, SC
11/28/2016*; 7:00 p.m.		Delaware State	W 82–48	4–1	Kaplan Arena (319); Williamsburg, VA
12/01/2016*; 7:00 p.m.		Dartmouth	W 63–50	5–1	Kaplan Arena (381); Williamsburg, VA
12/03/2016*; 2:00 p.m.		at American	W 48–34	6–1	Bender Arena (297); Washington, D.C.
12/15/2016*; 7:00 p.m.		at Norfolk State	W 65–52	7–1	Joseph G. Echols Memorial Hall (223); Norfolk, VA
12/18/2016*; 2:00 p.m.		Mount St. Mary's	W 68–46	8–1	Kaplan Arena (310); Williamsburg, VA
12/20/2016*; 7:00 p.m.		Saint Francis (PA)	W 73–60	9–1	Kaplan Arena (268); Williamsburg, VA
12/28/2016*; 7:00 p.m.		East Carolina	W 82–72	10–1	Kaplan Arena (372); Williamsburg, VA
CAA regular season
01/02/2017; 3:00 p.m.		at Delaware	W 60–49	11–1 (1–0)	Bob Carpenter Center (2,619); Newark, DE
01/06/2017; 6:30 p.m.		at College of Charleston	L 60–70	11–2 (1–1) (Note: This game was treated as a W&M win for purposes of CAA tournament seeding, though counting as a Charleston win for all other purposes.)	TD Arena (183); Charleston, SC
01/08/2017; 2:00 p.m.		Hofstra; Postponed (snow), rescheduled 02/07/2017			Kaplan Arena; Williamsburg, VA
01/13/2017; 7:00 p.m.		Northeastern	W 60–58	12–2 (2–1)	Kaplan Arena (420); Williamsburg, VA
01/15/2017; 2:00 p.m.		at UNC Wilmington	W 57–43	13–2 (3–1)	Trask Coliseum (451); Wilmington, NC
01/20/2017; 7:00 p.m.		at Towson	L 60–64	13–3 (3–2)	SECU Arena (167); Towson, MD
01/22/2017; 2:00 p.m.		Elon	L 58–60	13–4 (3–3)	Kaplan Arena (434); Williamsburg, VA
01/27/2017; 7:00 p.m.		Delaware	L 54–68	13–5 (3–4)	Kaplan Arena (433); Williamsburg, VA
01/29/2017; 2:00 p.m.		James Madison	L 64–79	13–6 (3–5)	Kaplan Arena (1,106); Williamsburg, VA
02/03/2017; 7:00 p.m.		at Northeastern	W 68–54	14–6 (4–5)	Cabot Center (166); Boston, MA
02/05/2017; 2:00 p.m.		at Hofstra	L 61–64	14–7 (4–6)	Hofstra Arena (376); Hempstead, NY
02/07/2017; 7:00 p.m.		Hofstra	W 81–65	15–7 (5–6)	Kaplan Arena (236); Williamsburg, VA
02/10/2017; 7:00 p.m.		at Drexel	L 48–65	15–8 (5–7)	Daskalakis Athletic Center (340); Philadelphia, PA
02/12/2017; 2:00 p.m.		Towson	W 68–55	16–8 (6–7)	Kaplan Arena (418); Williamsburg, VA
02/17/2017; 7:00 p.m.		College of Charleston	L 69–71 ^{OT}	16–9 (6–8)	Kaplan Arena (512); Williamsburg, VA
02/19/2017; 2:00 p.m.		at Elon	L 47–70	16–10 (6–9)	Alumni Gym (831); Elon, NC
02/24/2017; 7:00 p.m.		UNC Wilmington	W 58–52	17–10 (7–9)	Kaplan Arena (463); Williamsburg, VA
02/26/2017; 5:00 p.m., ASN		at James Madison	W 62–53	18–10 (8–9)	JMU Convocation Center (2,985); Harrisonburg, VA
03/01/2017; 7:00 p.m.		Drexel	W 74–65	19–10 (9–9)	Kaplan Arena (361); Williamsburg, VA
CAA Women's Tournament
03/09/2017; 2:30 pm		vs. Delaware; Quarterfinals	W 59–44	20–10	JMU Convocation Center (2,497); Williamsburg, VA
03/10/2017; 4:30 pm, CSN		vs. Elon; Semifinals	L 60–88	20–11	JMU Convocation Center; Williamsburg, VA
*Non-conference game. ^{#}Rankings from AP Poll. (#) Tournament seedings in parentheses. All times are in Eastern Time.

== See also ==
- 2016–17 William & Mary Tribe men's basketball team
