= 2016–17 Drexel Dragons women's basketball team =

Sports team season

2016–17 Drexel Dragons women's basketball

WNIT, Second Round
- Conference: Colonial Athletic Association
- Record: 22–11 (11–7 CAA)
- Head coach: Denise Dillon (14th season)
- Assistant coaches: Amy Mallon; Stacy McCullough; Michelle Baker
- MVP: Sarah Curran
- Home arena: Daskalakis Athletic Center

2016–17 CAA women's basketball standings
	Conf.				Overall
Team	W		L	PCT	W		L	PCT
Elon †	16	–	2	.889	27	–	7	.794
James Madison	15	–	3	.833	26	–	9	.743
Drexel	11	–	7	.611	22	–	11	.667
Delaware	10	–	8	.556	16	–	14	.533
William & Mary	9	–	9	.500	20	–	11	.645
Northeastern	8	–	10	.444	12	–	19	.387
College of Charleston	6	–	12	.333	9	–	21	.300
Hofstra	5	–	13	.278	13	–	18	.419
Towson	5	–	13	.278	12	–	18	.400
UNC Wilmington	5	–	13	.278	11	–	20	.355
† 2017 CAA tournament winner As of March 23, 2017; Rankings from AP poll

The 2016–17 Drexel Dragons women's basketball team represented Drexel University during the 2016–17 NCAA Division I women's basketball season. The Dragons, led by fourteenth year head coach Denise Dillon, played their home games at the Daskalakis Athletic Center and were members of the Colonial Athletic Association (CAA). They finished the season 22–11, 11–7 in CAA play to finish in third place. They advanced to the semifinals of the CAA women's tournament where they lost to James Madison. They were invited to the Women's National Invitational Tournament where they defeated Duquesne in the first round before losing to Villanova in the second round.

== Off season ==
=== 2016 Recruiting Class ===
College recruiting information
Name	Hometown	School	Height	Weight	Commit date
Bailey Greenberg; W	North Wales, PA	Archbishop Wood High School	6 ft 0 in (1.83 m)	N/A	May 20, 2015
Bailey Greenberg; W	Recruit ratings: ESPN: (89)				
Overall recruit ranking:
Note: In many cases, Scout, Rivals, 247Sports, On3, and ESPN may conflict in their listings of height and weight.; In these cases, the average was taken. ESPN grades are on a 100-point scale.; Sources: "Drexel Dragons". ESPN.; "2016 Team Ranking". Rivals.

== Roster ==
2016–17 Drexel Dragons women's basketball team
Players
Coaches

Pos.	#	Name	Height	Year	Previous school	Hometown
F	10	Eline Maesschalck	5 ft 11 in (1.8 m)	So	KA Redingenhof	Aalst, Belgium
G	11	Aubree Brown	5 ft 11 in (1.8 m)	RS Fr	Archbishop Wood	Philadelphia, PA
F	12	Bailey Greenberg	5 ft 11 in (1.8 m)	Fr	Archbishop Wood	Philadelphia, PA
G/F	14	Sara Woods	5 ft 10 in (1.78 m)	Jr	Good Counsel	Olney, MD
G	21	Megan Marecic	5 ft 11 in (1.8 m)	RS So	Bethel Park	Bethel Park, PA
G	22	Meghan Creighton	5 ft 7 in (1.7 m)	RS Sr	Archbishop Carroll	West Chester, PA
G	23	Alexis Smith	5 ft 6 in (1.68 m)	Sr	Calvert	Lusby, MD
F	24	Niki Metzel	6 ft 2 in (1.88 m)	Fr	Rutgers Prep	Princeton, NJ
F	25	Kelsi Lidge	5 ft 8 in (1.73 m)	Jr	Regis Jesuit	Aurora, CO
F	30	Mariah Leonard (redshirt)	5 ft 10 in (1.78 m)	Fr	Broad Run	Ashburn, VA
F	33	Sarah Curran	5 ft 11 in (1.8 m)	Sr	Archbishop Carroll	Media, PA
C	34	Tereza Kracikova	6 ft 2 in (1.88 m)	So	Gymnazium Pripotocni	Prague, Czech Republic
G	50	Ana Ferariu	5 ft 9 in (1.75 m)	Fr	Johannes Honterus	Brașov, Romania

Head coach

- Denise Dillon (Villanova)

Assistant coach(es)

- Amy Mallon (Saint Joseph's)
- Stacy McCullough (Drexel)
- Michelle Baker (Saint Joseph's)

Legend

- (C) Team captain
- (S) Suspended
- (I) Ineligible
- (W) Walk-on
- Injured
- Current redshirt

Roster

== Schedule ==
Date time, TV	Rank^{#}	Opponent^{#}	Result	Record	High points	High rebounds	High assists	Site (attendance) city, state
Non-conference regular season
November 11, 2016*; 7:00 pm		Penn State	W 83–60	1–0	30 – Pellechio	6 – Lidge	5 – Creighton	Daskalakis Athletic Center (1,057); Philadelphia, PA
November 13, 2016*; 2:00 pm		Delaware State	W 69–44	2–0	18 – Curran	8 – Pellechio	7 – Curran	Daskalakis Athletic Center (678); Philadelphia, PA
November 16, 2016*; 8:00 pm		at Vanderbilt	L 63–73	2–1	19 – Curran	5 – Tied	8 – Creighton	Memorial Gymnasium (2,243); Nashville, TN
November 21, 2016*; 7:00 pm		No. 11 Syracuse	W 62–61	3–1	23 – Creighton	6 – Pellechio	6 – Lidge	Daskalakis Athletic Center (762); Philadelphia, PA
November 27, 2016*; 2:00 pm		at Bucknell	L 66–78	3–2	19 – Curran	6 – Kracikova	5 – Creighton	Sojka Pavilion (454); Lewisburg, PA
December 3, 2016*; 1:00 pm		at Cornell	W 63–53	4–2	17 – Pellechio	5 – Tied	8 – Creighton	Newman Arena (319); Ithaca, NY
December 13, 2016*; 5:00 pm		Niagara	W 69–57	5–2	29 – Creighton	12 – Greenberg	6 – Lidge	Daskalakis Athletic Center (545); Philadelphia, PA
December 18, 2016*; 2:00 pm		Saint Joseph's	W 60–49	6–2	18 – Ferariu	4 – Tied	2 – Tied	Daskalakis Athletic Center (895); Philadelphia, PA
December 21, 2016*; 2:00 pm		at Lafayette	W 81–39	7–2	14 – Pellechio	6 – Brown	4 – Curran	Kirby Sports Center (437); Easton, PA
December 27, 2016*; 2:00 pm		vs. George Mason; FIU Holiday Tournament	W 82–71	8–2	29 – Curran	7 – Greenberg	5 – Creighton	FIU Arena (339); Miami, FL
December 28, 2016*; 12:00 pm		vs. Massachusetts; FIU Holiday Tournament	W 65–47	9–2	20 – Curran	5 – Tied	4 – Lidge	FIU Arena (369); Miami, FL
CAA regular season
January 2, 2017; 2:00 pm		Towson	W 58–48	10–2 (1–0)	17 – Brown	9 – Greenberg	4 – Tied	Daskalakis Athletic Center; Philadelphia, PA
January 6, 2017; 7:00 pm		Elon	L 45–48	10–3 (1–1)	15 – Curran	9 – Lidge	3 – Tied	Daskalakis Athletic Center (520); Philadelphia, PA
January 8, 2017; 2:00 pm		at Northeastern	W 63–33	11–3 (2–1)	20 – Pellechio	10 – Woods	6 – Curran	Cabot Center (312); Boston, MA
January 13, 2017; 7:00 pm		at UNC Wilmington	W 71–38	12–3 (3–1)	17 – Curran	6 – Greenberg	3 – Tied	Trask Coliseum (551); Wilmington, NC
January 15, 2017; 3:00 pm, ASN		at Elon	L 65–75	12–4 (3–2)	24 – Pellechio	6 – Pellechio	4 – Lidge	Alumni Gym (1,054); Elon, NC
January 20, 2017; 7:00 pm		College of Charleston	W 70–57	13–4 (4–2)	10 – Curran	5 – Tied	5 – Lidge	Daskalakis Athletic Center (397); Philadelphia, PA
January 22, 2017; 2:00 pm		Hofstra	W 63–43	14–4 (5–2)	17 – Curran	7 – Curran	4 – Creighton	Daskalakis Athletic Center (1,050); Philadelphia, PA
January 27, 2017; 7:00 pm		at James Madison	L 47–54	14–5 (5–3)	12 – Curran	7 – Curran	4 – Creighton	JMU Convocation Center (3,082); Harrisonburg, VA
January 29, 2017; 2:00 pm		Northeastern	W 74–51	15–5 (6–3)	24 – Curran	8 – Curran	9 – Creighton	Daskalakis Athletic Center (785); Philadelphia, PA
February 3, 2017; 6:30 pm		at College of Charleston	L 75–79	15–6 (6–4)	21 – Pellechio	7 – Pellechio	5 – Curran	TD Arena (377); Charleston, SC
February 5, 2017; 2:00 pm		at Delaware	W 54–44	16–6 (7–4)	20 – Curran	10 – Woods	3 – Brown	Bob Carpenter Center (1,829); Newark, DE
February 10, 2017; 7:00 pm		William & Mary	W 65–48	17–6 (8–4)	15 – Pellechio	6 – Tied	3 – Tied	Daskalakis Athletic Center (340); Philadelphia, PA
February 12, 2017; 1:00 pm		UNC Wilmington	W 76–51	18–6 (9–4)	30 – Creighton	6 – Greenberg	4 – Tied	Daskalakis Athletic Center (505); Philadelphia, PA
February 17, 2017; 7:00 pm		at Towson	W 80–65	19–6 (10–4)	19 – Curran	6 – Brown	4 – Tied	SECU Arena (387); Towson, MD
February 19, 2017; 3:00 pm, ASN		Delaware	W 53–49	20–6 (11–4)	23 – Pellechio	8 – Greenberg	4 – Brown	Daskalakis Athletic Center (640); Philadelphia, PA
February 24, 2017; 7:00 pm		James Madison	L 64–74	20–7 (11–5)	14 – Curran	9 – Lidge	9 – Tied	Daskalakis Athletic Center (808); Philadelphia, PA
February 26, 2017; 2:00 pm		at Hofstra	L 53–58	20–8 (11–6)	18 – Curran	5 – Creighton	3 – Curran	Hofstra Arena (417); Hempstead, NY
March 1, 2017; 7:00 pm		at William & Mary	L 65–74	20–9 (11–7)	15 – Pellechio	6 – Curran	6 – Creighton	Kaplan Arena (361); Williamsburg, VA
CAA Tournament
March 9, 2017; 7:30 pm	(3)	vs. (6) Northeastern; Quarterfinals	W 68–50	21–9	18 – Creighton	9 – Curran	5 – Creighton	JMU Convocation Center; Harrisonburg, VA
March 10, 2017; 7:00 pm, CSN	(3)	vs. (2) James Madison; Semifinals	L 68–76	21–10	22 – Curran	7 – Woods	4 – Tied	JMU Convocation Center; Harrisonburg, VA
WNIT
March 17, 2017*; 7:00 pm		Duquesne; First Round	W 70–47	22–10	24 – Curran	9 – Lidge	6 – Brown	Daskalakis Athletic Center (417); Philadelphia
March 19, 2017*; 2:00 pm		Villanova; Second Round	L 51–56	22–11	20 – Curran	8 – Brown	6 – Creighton	Daskalakis Athletic Center (599); Philadelphia
*Non-conference game. ^{#}Rankings from AP. (#) Tournament seedings in parentheses. All times are in Eastern Time.

== See also ==
2016–17 Drexel Dragons men's basketball team
