= 2017 CAA women's basketball tournament =

- Classification: Division I
- Season: 2016–17
- Teams: 10
- Site: JMU Convocation Center; Harrisonburg, VA
- Champions: Elon (1st title)
- Winning coach: Charlotte Smith (1st title)
- MVP: Lauren Brown (Elon)
- Television: CSN, ASN, CAA.tv
- CAA women's basketball tournaments

2016–17 CAA women's basketball standings
	Conf.				Overall
Team	W		L	PCT	W		L	PCT
Elon †	16	–	2	.889	27	–	7	.794
James Madison	15	–	3	.833	26	–	9	.743
Drexel	11	–	7	.611	22	–	11	.667
Delaware	10	–	8	.556	16	–	14	.533
William & Mary	9	–	9	.500	20	–	11	.645
Northeastern	8	–	10	.444	12	–	19	.387
College of Charleston	6	–	12	.333	9	–	21	.300
Hofstra	5	–	13	.278	13	–	18	.419
Towson	5	–	13	.278	12	–	18	.400
UNC Wilmington	5	–	13	.278	11	–	20	.355
† 2017 CAA tournament winner As of March 23, 2017; Rankings from AP poll

The 2017 Colonial Athletic Association women's basketball tournament was a postseason event was held from March 8–11, 2017 at the JMU Convocation Center in Harrisonburg, Virginia. Elon won their first CAA Women's Basketball Tournament in school history and earn an automatic trip to the NCAA women's tournament.

== Seeds ==
Due to the revelation that Charleston had supplied improperly sized basketballs in its home conference wins over William & Mary and UNCW, the CAA announced on February 2 that those games would be treated as Charleston losses for purposes of CAA tournament seeding, although they still count as Charleston wins for all other purposes.

Seed	School	Conference	Overall	Tiebreaker 1	Tiebreaker 2
1	‡† Elon	16–2	24–6		
2	† James Madison	15–3	22–7		
3	† Drexel	11–7	20–9		
4	† William & Mary	10–8	19–10	1–1 vs. Delaware	0–2 vs. Elon, 1–1 vs. JMU
5	† Delaware	10–8	16–13	1–1 vs. William & Mary	0–2 vs. Elon, 0–2 vs. JMU
6	† Northeastern	8–10	12–18		
7	UNC Wilmington	6–12	10–19		
8	Towson	5–13	12–17	1–1 vs. Hofstra	0–2 vs. Elon, 2–0 vs. JMU
9	Hofstra	5–13	12–17	1–1 vs. Towson	0–2 vs. Elon, 0–2 vs. JMU
10	College of Charleston	4–14	9–20		
‡ – CAA regular season champions. † – Received a bye in the conference tournament. Overall records are as of the end of the regular season. Changes due to the Charleston basketball size scandal: William & Mary's CAA record for tournament seeding purposes was 10–8 instead of its actual 9–9.; UNCW's CAA record for tournament seeding purposes was 6–12 instead of its actual 5–13.; Charleston's CAA record for tournament seeding purposes was 4–14 instead of its actual 6–12.

== Schedule ==
Session	Game	Time*	Matchup^{#}	Television	Score	Attendance
First round – Wednesday, March 8, 2017
1	1	12:00 pm	#9 Hofstra vs. 8 Towson	CAA.tv	77–66	1,123
1	2	2:30 pm	#10 College of Charleston vs. #7 UNC Wilmington	CAA.tv	44–49	1,123
Quarterfinals – Thursday, March 9, 2017
2	3	12:00 pm	#9 Hofstra vs. #1 Elon	CAA.tv	50–78	2,497
2	4	2:30 pm	#5 Delaware vs #4 William & Mary	CAA.tv	44–59	2,497
3	5	5:00 pm	#7 UNC Wilmington vs. #2 James Madison	CAA.tv	27–52	
3	6	7:30 pm	#6 Northeastern vs #3 Drexel	CAA.tv	50–68	
Semifinals – Friday, March 10, 2017
4	7	4:30 pm	#1 Elon vs. #4 William & Mary	CSN	88–60	
4	8	7:00 pm	#2 James Madison vs. #3 Drexel	CSN	76–68	
Championship – Saturday, March 11, 2017
5	9	7:00 pm	#1 Elon vs #2 James Madison	CSN	78–60	
*Game times in ET.

== Bracket ==
First round Wednesday, March 8 CAA.tv
8	Towson	66
9	Hofstra	77
7	UNC Wilmington	49
10	College of Charleston	44

Quarterfinals; Thursday, March 9 ASN
1	Elon	78
9	Hofstra	50
4	William & Mary	59
5	Delaware	44
2	James Madison	52
7	UNC Wilmington	27
6	Northeastern	50
3	Drexel	68

Semifinals; Friday, March 10; CSN
1	Elon	88
4	William & Mary	60
2	James Madison	76
3	Drexel	68

Final; Saturday, March 11; CSN
1	Elon	78
2	James Madison	60

== See also ==
- 2017 CAA men's basketball tournament
