= 2016–17 James Madison Dukes women's basketball team =

Intercollegiate basketball season

2016–17 James Madison Dukes women's basketball

WNIT, Third Round
- Conference: Colonial Athletic Association
- Record: 26–9 (15–3 CAA)
- Head coach: Sean O'Regan (1st season)
- Assistant coaches: Bridgette Mitchell; Ian Caskill; Ashlee McGee
- Home arena: JMU Convocation Center

2016–17 CAA women's basketball standings
	Conf.				Overall
Team	W		L	PCT	W		L	PCT
Elon †	16	–	2	.889	27	–	7	.794
James Madison	15	–	3	.833	26	–	9	.743
Drexel	11	–	7	.611	22	–	11	.667
Delaware	10	–	8	.556	16	–	14	.533
William & Mary	9	–	9	.500	20	–	11	.645
Northeastern	8	–	10	.444	12	–	19	.387
College of Charleston	6	–	12	.333	9	–	21	.300
Hofstra	5	–	13	.278	13	–	18	.419
Towson	5	–	13	.278	12	–	18	.400
UNC Wilmington	5	–	13	.278	11	–	20	.355
† 2017 CAA tournament winner As of March 23, 2017; Rankings from AP poll

The 2016–17 James Madison Dukes women's basketball team represented James Madison University during the 2016–17 NCAA Division I women's basketball season. The Dukes, led by first-year head coach Sean O'Regan, played their home games at the James Madison University Convocation Center and were members of the Colonial Athletic Association (CAA). They finished the season 26–9, 15–3 in CAA play to finish in second place. They advanced to the championship game of the CAA women's tournament, where they lost to Elon. They received an automatic bid to the Women's National Invitation Tournament, where they defeated Radford and Virginia in the first and second rounds before losing to Villanova in the third round.

== Roster ==
2016–17 James Madison Dukes women's basketball team
Players
Coaches

Pos.	#	Name	Height	Year	Previous school	Hometown
F	4	Tasia Butler	6 ft 1 in (1.85 m)	RS Jr	North Point; Syracuse	Waldorf, MD
G	10	Aneah Young	5 ft 11 in (1.8 m)	So	Baltimore Polytechnic Institute	Baltimore, MD
G	12	Precious Hall	5 ft 8 in (1.73 m)	RS Sr	Maclay School	Tallahassee, FL
G	13	Logan Reynolds	5 ft 7 in (1.7 m)	So	Central	Norton, VA
G	14	Hailee Barron	5 ft 10 in (1.78 m)	Jr	Rice	Burlington, VT
G	15	Lexie Barrier	5 ft 10 in (1.78 m)	Fr	Ironton	Ironton, OH
G	20	Kamiah Smalls	5 ft 10 in (1.78 m)	Fr	Neumann Goretti	Philadelphia, PA
F/C	22	Amber Porter	6 ft 3 in (1.91 m)	RS Jr	Potomac; Stetson	Woodbridge, VA
C	31	Kayla Cooper-Williams	6 ft 2 in (1.88 m)	So	C. D. Hylton	Dumfries, VA
F	33	Kelly Koshuta (I) (redshirt)	6 ft 2 in (1.88 m)	So	James Madison; Virginia Tech	Vienna, VA
C	40	Da'Lishia Griffin	6 ft 2 in (1.88 m)	Sr	Western Branch	Chesapeake, VA
F	42	Devon Merritt	6 ft 2 in (1.88 m)	Fr	Berks Catholic	Reading, PA
F	45	Savannah Felgemacher	6 ft 3 in (1.91 m)	So	Volunteer	Church Hill, TN

Head coach

- Sean O'Regan (James Madison)

Assistant coach(es)

- Bridgette Mitchell (Duke)
- Ian Caskill (James Madison)
- Ashlee McGee (Austin Peay)

Legend

- (C) Team captain
- (S) Suspended
- (I) Ineligible
- (W) Walk-on
- Injured
- Current redshirt

Roster

== Schedule ==
Date time, TV	Rank^{#}	Opponent^{#}	Result	Record	Site (attendance) city, state
Exhibition
11/06/2016*; 2:00 pm		Glenville State	W 114–79		JMU Convocation Center; Harrisonburg, VA
Non-conference regular season
11/11/2016*; 7:00 pm		No. 13 Tennessee	L 69–81	0–1	JMU Convocation Center (3,471); Harrisonburg, VA
11/13/2016*; 4:00 pm		St. Francis Brooklyn	W 83–57	1–1	JMU Convocation Center (3,480); Harrisonburg, VA
11/15/2016*; 5:00 pm		at Liberty	W 62–48	2–1	Vines Center (826); Lynchburg, VA
11/20/2016*; 1:00 pm, ACCN Extra		at No. 12 Florida State	L 64–84	2–2	Donald L. Tucker Center (3,030); Tallahassee, FL
11/24/2016*; 6:30 pm		vs. Idaho State; Cancún Challenge Riviera Division	W 83–53	3–2	Hard Rock Hotel Riviera Maya (1,610); Cancún, Mexico
11/25/2016*; 9:00 pm		vs. Iowa; Cancún Challenge Riviera Division	L 75–90	3–3	Hard Rock Hotel Riviera Maya (1,610); Cancún, Mexico
12/02/2016*; 7:00 pm		Hampton	W 71–50	4–3	JMU Convocation Center (2,678); Harrisonburg, VA
12/05/2016*; 7:00 pm		at Rutgers	W 82–76 ^{2OT}	5–3	Louis Brown Athletic Center (1,320); Piscataway, NJ
12/21/2016*; 11:00 am, ESPN3		at St. John's	L 63–74	5–4	Carnesecca Arena (5,602); Queens, NY
12/28/2016*; 7:00 pm		at Saint Joseph's	W 85–72	6–4	Hagan Arena (923); Philadelphia, PA
12/31/2016*; 4:30 pm		Wake Forest	W 83–76	7–4	JMU Convocation Center (3,212); Harrisonburg, VA
CAA regular season
01/02/2017; 2:00 pm		UNC Wilmington	W 73–51	8–4 (1–0)	JMU Convocation Center (2,139); Harrisonburg, VA
01/06/2017; 7:00 pm		Hofstra	W 93–57	9–4 (2–0)	JMU Convocation Center (2,118); Harrisonburg, VA
01/08/2017; 2:00 pm		at Towson	L 51–54	9–5 (2–1)	SECU Arena (454); Towson, MD
01/13/2017; 7:00 pm		at Delaware	W 66–51	10–5 (3–1)	Bob Carpenter Center (1,378); Newark, DE
01/15/2017; 2:00 pm		Northeastern	W 74–54	11–5 (4–1)	JMU Convocation Center (2,358); Harrisonburg, VA
01/20/2017; 7:00 pm		at Elon	W 76–70	12–5 (5–1)	Alumni Gym (1,412); Elon, NC
01/22/2017; 2:00 pm		Towson	L 55–60	13–5 (5–2)	JMU Convocation Center (4,135); Harrisonburg, VA
01/27/2017; 7:00 pm		Drexel	W 54–47	14–5 (6–2)	JMU Convocation Center (3,082); Harrisonburg, VA
01/29/2017; 2:00 pm		William & Mary	W 79–64	15–5 (7–2)	Kaplan Arena (1,106); Williamsburg, VA
02/03/2017; 7:00 pm		at Hofstra	W 61–50	16–5 (8–2)	Hofstra Arena (859); Hempstead, NY
02/05/2017; 2:00 pm		at Northeastern	W 67–49	17–5 (9–2)	Cabot Center (180); Boston, MA
02/10/2017; 7:00 pm		Delaware	W 77–42	17–6 (10–2)	JMU Convocation Center (2,428); Harrisonburg, VA
02/12/2017; 3:00 pm, ASN		Elon	W 61–54	18–6 (11–2)	JMU Convocation Center (4,019); Harrisonburg, VA
02/17/2017; 7:00 pm		at UNC Wilmington	W 70–59	19–6 (12–2)	Trask Coliseum (641); Wilmington, NC
02/19/2017; 2:00 pm		at College of Charleston	W 84–78	20–6 (13–2)	TD Arena (311); Charleston, SC
02/24/2017; 7:00 pm		at Drexel	W 74–64	21–6 (14–2)	Daskalakis Athletic Center (808); Philadelphia, PA
02/26/2017; 5:00 pm, ASN		at William & Mary	L 53–62	21–7 (14–3)	JMU Convocation Center (2,985); Harrisonburg, VA
03/01/2017; 7:00 pm		College of Charleston	W 74–60	22–7 (15–3)	JMU Convocation Center (2,319); Harrisonburg, VA
CAA Women's Tournament
03/09/2017; 5:00 pm, ASN	(2)	vs. (7) UNC Wilmington; Quarterfinals	W 52–27	23–7	JMU Convocation Center; Harrisonburg, VA
03/10/2017; 7:30 pm, CSN	(2)	vs. (3) Drexel; Semifinals	W 76–68	24–7	JMU Convocation Center; Harrisonburg, VA
03/11/2017; 7:30 pm, CSN	(2)	vs. (1) Elon; Championship Game	L 60–78	24–8	JMU Convocation Center; Harrisonburg, VA
WNIT
03/17/2017*; 7:00 pm		Radford; First Round	W 80–59	25–8	JMU Convocation Center (1,292); Harrisonburg, VA
03/19/2017*; 2:00 pm		Virginia; Second Round	W 61–55	26–8	JMU Convocation Center (1,626); Harrisonburg, VA
03/23/2017*; 7:00 pm		Villanova; Third Round	L 67–69 ^{OT}	26–9	JMU Convocation Center (1,712); Harrisonburg, VA
*Non-conference game. ^{#}Rankings from AP Poll. (#) Tournament seedings in parentheses. All times are in Eastern Time.

== Rankings ==
Regular season polls
Poll	Pre- season	Week 2	Week 3	Week 4	Week 5	Week 6	Week 7	Week 8	Week 9	Week 10	Week 11	Week 12	Week 13	Week 14	Week 15	Week 16	Week 17	Week 18	Week 19	Final
AP																				N/A
Coaches																				

Legend
	Increase in ranking
	Decrease in ranking
	No change
(RV)	Received votes

== See also ==
- 2016–17 James Madison Dukes men's basketball team
