= 2016–17 Charleston Cougars women's basketball team =

Intercollegiate basketball season

2016–17 Charleston Cougars women's basketball
- Conference: Colonial Athletic Association
- Record: 9–21 (6–12 CAA)
- Head coach: Candice M. Jackson (3rd season)
- Assistant coaches: Bob Clark; Kelvin Long; Adria Crawford
- Home arena: TD Arena

2016–17 CAA women's basketball standings
	Conf.				Overall
Team	W		L	PCT	W		L	PCT
Elon †	16	–	2	.889	27	–	7	.794
James Madison	15	–	3	.833	26	–	9	.743
Drexel	11	–	7	.611	22	–	11	.667
Delaware	10	–	8	.556	16	–	14	.533
William & Mary	9	–	9	.500	20	–	11	.645
Northeastern	8	–	10	.444	12	–	19	.387
College of Charleston	6	–	12	.333	9	–	21	.300
Hofstra	5	–	13	.278	13	–	18	.419
Towson	5	–	13	.278	12	–	18	.400
UNC Wilmington	5	–	13	.278	11	–	20	.355
† 2017 CAA tournament winner As of March 23, 2017; Rankings from AP poll

The 2016–17 Charleston Cougars women's basketball team represented the College of Charleston during the 2016–17 NCAA Division I women's basketball season. The Cougars, led by third-year head coach Candice M. Jackson, played their home games at the TD Arena in Charleston, South Carolina and were members of the Colonial Athletic Association (CAA). They finished the season 9–21, 6–12 CAA play, to finish in seventh place. They lost in the first round of the CAA women's tournament to UNC Wilmington.

Due to the revelation that Charleston had supplied improperly sized basketballs in its home conference wins over William & Mary and UNC Wilmington, the CAA announced on February 2 that those games would be treated as Charleston losses for purposes of CAA tournament seeding, although they still count as Charleston wins for all other purposes.

== Roster ==
2016–17 College of Charleston Cougars women's basketball team
Players
Coaches

Pos.	#	Name	Height	Year	Previous school	Hometown
G	1	Nola Henry	5 ft 7 in (1.7 m)	RS Sr	Willingboro; Massachusetts	Willingboro, NJ
G	2	Darien Huff	5 ft 8 in (1.73 m)	So	Elizabethtown	Elizabethtown, KY
G	3	Shiclasia Brown	5 ft 5 in (1.65 m)	Jr	Nazareth Regional	Corona, NY
G	5	Cailin Dorsey	5 ft 11 in (1.8 m)	Fr	Ravenscroft School	Raleigh, NC
G	10	Dee Heath	5 ft 9 in (1.75 m)	Fr	Northwood Academy	Hanahan, SC
F	14	Courtney Gardner	5 ft 11 in (1.8 m)	Sr	Brookwood	Snellville, GA
G	15	Tanisha Brown	5 ft 11 in (1.8 m)	RS Jr	Myrtle Beach; Charlotte	Loris, SC
F	20	Bri Sullivan	6 ft 1 in (1.85 m)	So	Colonial Forge	Fredericksburg, VA
F/C	21	Baileigh Larson	6 ft 2 in (1.88 m)	Fr	Oakleaf	Orange Park, FL
F/C	23	Brianna Boyd	6 ft 3 in (1.91 m)	RS Jr	Pinewood Prep; Winthrop	Ridgeville, SC
F	24	Breanna Bolden	5 ft 11 in (1.8 m)	Sr	South River	Edgewater, MD
G	25	Deja Ford	5 ft 9 in (1.75 m)	Fr	St. Mary's Ryken	Waldorf, MD
F	40	Dajan Logan	5 ft 11 in (1.8 m)	So	McDonogh	Randallstown, MD

Head coach

- Candice M. Jackson (Michigan State)

Assistant coach(es)

- Bob Clark (Towson)
- Kelvin Long (East Tennessee State)
- Adria Crawford (Georgetown)

Legend

- (C) Team captain
- (S) Suspended
- (I) Ineligible
- (W) Walk-on
- Injured
- Current redshirt

Roster
Last update: October 20, 2024

== Schedule ==
Date time, TV	Rank^{#}	Opponent^{#}	Result	Record	Site (attendance) city, state
Exhibition
November 2, 2016*; 6:30 p.m.		Armstrong State	W 66–57		TD Arena; Charleston, SC
Non-conference regular season
November 13, 2016*; 2:00 p.m.		Charlotte	L 49–62	0–1	TD Arena (681); Charleston, SC
November 16, 2016*; 7:00 p.m.		at Winthrop	W 95–64	1–1	Winthrop Coliseum (394); Rock Hill, SC
November 19, 2016*; 6:00 p.m., ACCN Extra		at NC State	L 47–91	1–2	Reynolds Coliseum (2,152); Raleigh, NC
November 22, 2016*; 6:30 p.m.		Virginia Tech	L 61–71	1–3	TD Arena (330); Charleston, SC
November 27, 2016*; 2:00 p.m.		at Appalachian State	W 65–62	2–3	Holmes Center (206); Boone, NC
November 30, 2016*; 6:30 p.m.		North Florida	L 47–60	2–4	TD Arena (520); Charleston, SC
December 4, 2016*; 3:00 p.m.		at Houston	L 63–79	2–5	Hofheinz Pavilion (565); Houston, TX
December 16, 2016*; 7:00 p.m., ACCN Extra		at No. 8 Louisville	L 58–86	2–6	KFC Yum! Center (7,567); Louisville, KY
December 18, 2016*; 3:00 p.m.		at WKU	L 76–89	2–7	E. A. Diddle Arena (1,051); Bowling Green, KY
December 20, 2016*; 4:00 p.m.		Coastal Carolina	L 72–79	2–8	TD Arena (402); Charleston, SC
December 22, 2016*; 4:00 p.m.		at Charleston Southern	W 79–76	3–8	CSU Field House (278); Charleston, SC
CAA regular season
January 2, 2017; 7:00 p.m.		at Elon	L 57–70	3–9 (0–1)	Alumni Gym (338); Elon, NC
January 6, 2017; 6:30 p.m.		William & Mary	W 70–60	4–9 (1–1)	TD Arena (183); Charleston, SC
January 8, 2017; 2:00 p.m.		UNC Wilmington	W 76–37	5–9 (2–1)	TD Arena (303); Charleston, SC
January 13, 2017; 6:30 p.m.		Elon	L 56–84	5–10 (2–2)	TD Arena (520); Charleston, SC
January 15, 2017; 2:00 p.m.		at Towson	L 59–61	5–11 (2–3)	SECU Arena (257); Towson, MD
January 20, 2017; 7:00 p.m.		at Drexel	L 57–70	5–12 (2–4)	Daskalakis Athletic Center (1,050); Philadelphia, PA
January 22, 2017; 2:00 p.m.		at Delaware	L 66–71	5–13 (2–5)	Bob Carpenter Center (1,477); Newark, DE
January 27, 2017; 11:00 a.m.		Hofstra	W 71–55	6–13 (3–5)	TD Arena (1,715); Charleston, SC
January 29, 2017; 2:00 p.m.		at UNC Wilmington	L 61–67	6–14 (3–6)	Trask Coliseum (337); Wilmington, NC
February 3, 2017; 6:30 p.m.		Drexel	W 79–75	7–14 (4–6)	TD Arena (377); Charleston, SC
February 5, 2017; 2:00 p.m.		Towson	W 59–54	8–14 (5–6)	TD Arena (604); Charleston, SC
February 10, 2017; 7:00 p.m.		at Hofstra	L 81–85	8–15 (5–7)	Hofstra Arena (224); Hempstead, NY
February 12, 2017; 2:00 p.m.		at Northeastern	L 44–61	8–16 (5–8)	Cabot Center (204); Boston, MA
February 17, 2017; 7:00 p.m.		at William & Mary	W 71–69 ^{OT}	9–16 (6–8)	Kaplan Arena (512); Williamsburg, VA
February 19, 2017; 2:00 p.m.		James Madison	L 78–84	9–17 (6–9)	TD Arena (311); Charleston, SC
February 24, 2017; 6:30 p.m.		Northeastern	L 75–86	9–18 (6–10)	TD Arena (297); Charleston, SC
February 26, 2017; 2:00 p.m.		Delaware	L 56–69	9–19 (6–11)	TD Arena (328); Charleston, SC
March 1, 2017; 7:00 p.m.		at James Madison	L 60–74	9–20 (6–12)	JMU Convocation Center (2,319); Harrisonburg, VA
CAA women's tournament
March 8, 2017; 2:30 p.m.	(10)	vs. (7) UNC Wilmington; First round	L 44–49	9–21	JMU Convocation Center (1,123); Harrisonburg, VA
*Non-conference game. ^{#}Rankings from AP poll. (#) Tournament seedings in parentheses. All times are in Eastern.

== See also ==
- 2016–17 Charleston Cougars men's basketball team
