= 2016–17 Northeastern Huskies women's basketball team =

Intercollegiate basketball season

2016–17 Northeastern Huskies women's basketball
- Conference: Colonial Athletic Association
- Record: 12–19 (8–10 CAA)
- Head coach: Kelly Cole (3rd season)
- Assistant coaches: Ganiyat Adeduntan; Mike Leflar; Kindyll Dorsey
- Home arena: Cabot Center

2016–17 CAA women's basketball standings
	Conf.				Overall
Team	W		L	PCT	W		L	PCT
Elon †	16	–	2	.889	27	–	7	.794
James Madison	15	–	3	.833	26	–	9	.743
Drexel	11	–	7	.611	22	–	11	.667
Delaware	10	–	8	.556	16	–	14	.533
William & Mary	9	–	9	.500	20	–	11	.645
Northeastern	8	–	10	.444	12	–	19	.387
College of Charleston	6	–	12	.333	9	–	21	.300
Hofstra	5	–	13	.278	13	–	18	.419
Towson	5	–	13	.278	12	–	18	.400
UNC Wilmington	5	–	13	.278	11	–	20	.355
† 2017 CAA tournament winner As of March 23, 2017; Rankings from AP poll

The 2016–17 Northeastern Huskies women's basketball team represented the Northeastern University during the 2016–17 NCAA Division I women's basketball season. The Huskies, led by third year head coach Kelly Cole, played their home games at the Cabot Center and were members of the Colonial Athletic Association (CAA). They finished the season 12–19, 8–10 CAA play to finish in sixth place. They lost in the quarterfinals of the CAA women's tournament to Drexel.

== Roster ==
2016–17 Northeastern Huskies women's basketball team
Players
Coaches

Pos.	#	Name	Height	Year	Previous school	Hometown
G	1	Zoe Zwerling	5 ft 8 in (1.73 m)	So	Henry M. Gunn	Palo Alto, CA
G	3	Loren Lassiter	5 ft 11 in (1.8 m)	Jr	Bishop O'Dowd	Castro Valley, CA
G	4	Claudia Oritz	5 ft 7 in (1.7 m)	RS Jr	SSan Jorge Academy; Ole Miss	Carolina, PR
G	10	Ayanna Dublin	5 ft 10 in (1.78 m)	Fr	Grace Church School	Brooklyn, NY
G	14	Shannon Todd	5 ft 10 in (1.78 m)	Fr	York	York, ME
G	20	Jess Genco	5 ft 5 in (1.65 m)	So	Scranton Prep	Scranton, PA
G	22	Te'Erica Eason	5 ft 8 in (1.73 m)	So	The Lovett School	Atlanta, GA
F	23	Courtney Redcross	6 ft 0 in (1.83 m)	Fr	The Shipley School	West Chester, PA
F	24	Gabriella Giacone	6 ft 0 in (1.83 m)	So	Bethlehem Central	Delmar, NY
F	25	Jasmine Braswell	6 ft 2 in (1.88 m)	Fr	Broad Run	Ashburn, VA
C	30	Briana Schnare	6 ft 3 in (1.91 m)	RS Sr	Wachusetts Regional HS; Manhattan	Holden, MA
F	32	Maureen Taggart	5 ft 11 in (1.8 m)	Jr	Tilton School	Wallingford, VT
C	33	Francesca Salley	6 ft 2 in (1.88 m)	Sr	East HS	Denver, CO

Head coach

- Kelly Cole (Northwestern)

Assistant coach(es)

- Ganiyat Adeduntan (Florida State)
- Mike Leflar (Boston College)
- Kindyll Dorsey (Boston College)

Legend

- (C) Team captain
- (S) Suspended
- (I) Ineligible
- (W) Walk-on
- Injured
- Current redshirt

Roster

== Schedule ==
Date time, TV	Rank^{#}	Opponent^{#}	Result	Record	Site (attendance) city, state
Non-conference regular season
11/11/2016*; 3:00 pm, NESN		Boston University	W 78–59	1–0	Cabot Center (412); Boston, MA
11/13/2016*; 2:00 pm, ESPN3		at Canisius	W 83–59	2–0	Koessler Athletic Center (552); Buffalo, NY
11/18/2016*; 12:00 pm		Saint Mary's	L 53–77	2–1	Cabot Center (1,250); Boston, MA
11/20/2016*; 2:00 pm		at Quinnipiac	L 59–76	2–2	TD Bank Sports Center (546); Hamden, CT
11/24/2016*; 11:00 am		vs. No. 11 Stanford; Cancún Challenge Mayan Division	L 45–74	2–3	Hard Rock Hotel Riviera Maya (1,610); Cancún, Mexico
11/25/2016*; 1:30 pm		vs. Purdue; Cancún Challenge Mayan Division	L 54–79	2–4	Hard Rock Hotel Riviera Maya (1,610); Cancún, Mexico
11/26/2016*; 11:00 am		vs. Wichita State; Cancún Challenge Mayan Division	L 73–87	2–5	Hard Rock Hotel Riviera Maya (1,610); Cancún, Mexico
12/01/2016*; 7:00 pm		New Hampshire	L 63–66 ^{OT}	2–6	Cabot Center (231); Boston, MA
12/07/2016*; 7:30 pm		at Maine	L 49–68	2–7	Cross Insurance Center; Bangor, ME
12/18/2016*; 12:00 pm		at Michigan State	L 44–78	2–8	Breslin Center (4,018); East Lansing, MI
12/20/2016*; 2:00 pm		at Denver	W 72–69	3–8	Magness Arena (596); Denver, CO
12/28/2016*; 2:00 pm		Siena	W 61–50	4–8	Cabot Center (343); Boston, MA
CAA regular season
01/02/2017; 2:00 pm		at Hofstra	W 53–51 ^{OT}	5–8 (1–0)	Hofstra Arena (1,702); Hempstead, NY
01/06/2017; 7:00 pm		Towson	W 72–64	6–8 (2–0)	Cabot Center (222); Boston, MA
01/08/2017; 2:00 pm		Drexel	L 33–63	6–9 (2–1)	Cabot Center (312); Boston, MA
01/13/2017; 7:00 pm		at William & Mary	L 58–60	6–10 (2–2)	Kaplan Arena (420); Williamsburg, VA
01/15/2017; 2:00 pm		at James Madison	L 54–74	6–11 (2–3)	JMU Convocation Center (2,358); Harrisonburg, VA
01/20/2017; 2:00 pm		at Delaware	L 53–65	6–12 (2–4)	Bob Carpenter Center (1,305); Newark, DE
01/22/2017; 2:00 pm		UNC Wilmington	W 55–47	7–12 (3–4)	Cabot Center (210); Boston, MA
01/27/2017; 7:00 pm		Elon	L 65–76	7–13 (3–5)	Cabot Center (327); Boston, MA
01/29/2017; 2:00 pm		at Drexel	L 51–74	7–14 (3–6)	Daskalakis Athletic Center (785); Philadelphia, PA
02/03/2017; 7:00 pm		William & Mary	L 54–68	7–15 (3–7)	Cabot Center (166); Boston, MA
02/05/2017; 2:00 pm		James Madison	L 49–67	7–16 (3–8)	Cabot Center (180); Boston, MA
02/10/2017; 7:00 pm		at Elon	L 65–76	7–17 (3–9)	Alumni Gym (531); Elon, NC
02/12/2017; 2:00 pm		College of Charleston	W 61–44	8–17 (4–9)	Cabot Center (204); Boston, MA
02/17/2017; 7:00 pm		Delaware	W 50–41	9–17 (5–9)	Cabot Center (240); Boston, MA
02/19/2017; 2:00 pm		at Towson	W 63–51	10–17 (6–9)	SECU Arena (234); Towson, MD
02/24/2017; 6:30 pm		at College of Charleston	W 86–75	11–17 (7–9)	TD Arena (297); Charleston, SC
02/26/2017; 2:00 pm		at UNC Wilmington	L 63–68	11–18 (7–10)	Trask Coliseum (623); Wilmington, NC
03/01/2017; 7:00 pm		Hofstra	W 52–46	12–18 (8–10)	Cabot Center (303); Boston, MA
CAA Women's Tournament
03/09/2017; 7:30 pm		vs. Drexel; Quarterfinals	L 50–68	12–19	JMU Convocation Center; Harrisonburg, VA
*Non-conference game. ^{#}Rankings from AP Poll. (#) Tournament seedings in parentheses. All times are in Eastern Time.

== See also ==
2016–17 Northeastern Huskies men's basketball team
