= 2016–17 Delaware Fightin' Blue Hens women's basketball team =

Intercollegiate basketball season

2016–17 Delaware Fightin' Blue Hens women's basketball
- Conference: Colonial Athletic Association
- Record: 16–14 (10–8 CAA)
- Head coach: Tina Martin (21st season)
- Assistant coaches: Jeanine Radice; Tom Lochner; Jade Singleton
- Home arena: Bob Carpenter Center

2016–17 CAA women's basketball standings
	Conf.				Overall
Team	W		L	PCT	W		L	PCT
Elon †	16	–	2	.889	27	–	7	.794
James Madison	15	–	3	.833	26	–	9	.743
Drexel	11	–	7	.611	22	–	11	.667
Delaware	10	–	8	.556	16	–	14	.533
William & Mary	9	–	9	.500	20	–	11	.645
Northeastern	8	–	10	.444	12	–	19	.387
College of Charleston	6	–	12	.333	9	–	21	.300
Hofstra	5	–	13	.278	13	–	18	.419
Towson	5	–	13	.278	12	–	18	.400
UNC Wilmington	5	–	13	.278	11	–	20	.355
† 2017 CAA tournament winner As of March 23, 2017; Rankings from AP poll

The 2016–17 Delaware Fightin' Blue Hens women's basketball team represented the University of Delaware during the 2016–17 NCAA Division I women's basketball season. The Fightin' Blue Hens, led by 21st year head coach Tina Martin, played their home games at the Bob Carpenter Center and were members of the Colonial Athletic Association (CAA). They finished the season 16–14, 10–8 CAA play to finish in fourth place. They played in the quarterfinal of the CAA women's tournament where they lost to William & Mary.

== Roster ==
2016–17 Delaware Fightin' Blue Hens women's basketball team
Players
Coaches

Pos.	#	Name	Height	Year	Previous school	Hometown
G	2	Abby Gonzales	5 ft 7 in (1.7 m)	Fr	North Allegheny	Wexford, PA
G	3	Erika Brown	5 ft 7 in (1.7 m)	Sr	John F. Kennedy	Haldeon, NJ
F	5	Makeda Nicholas	6 ft 1 in (1.85 m)	Jr	North Babylon	North Babylon, NY
F	12	Hannah Jardine (C)	6 ft 1 in (1.85 m)	Sr	O'Donel	St. John's, NL
F	13	Sadé Chatman (S)	6 ft 1 in (1.85 m)	RS Jr	Central; Clemson	St. Paul, Minnesota
G	21	Kiersten West	5 ft 9 in (1.75 m)	So	Longwood	Coram, NY
F	22	Samone DeFreese	5 ft 11 in (1.8 m)	Fr	Berkshire	Bergenfield, NJ
G	23	Bailey Kargo	5 ft 10 in (1.78 m)	Fr	Walter Hines Page	Greensboro, NC
F	25	Rebecca Lawrence	6 ft 3 in (1.91 m)	Fr	Walter Hines Page	Ridgefield, CT
F	33	Nicole Enabosi	6 ft 0 in (1.83 m)	So	Our Lady of Good Counsel	Gaithersburg, MD
F	40	Alexis Sears (injured)	6 ft 2 in (1.88 m)	Jr	Lenape HS	Mount Laurel, New Jersey
G		Alison Lewis (i)	5 ft 9 in (1.75 m)	Jr	Sanford School; Providence	Kennett Square, PA
G/F		Gadson Lefft (I) (redshirt)	6 ft 1 in (1.85 m)	So	Heathwood Hall/Phillips Academy; Clemson	Lake Wylie, SC
G		Danielle Roberts (I) (redshirt)	5 ft 6 in (1.68 m)	Jr	South Brunswick; Georgia Southern	Dayton, NJ

Head coach

- Tina Martin (Lock Haven)

Assistant coach(es)

- Jeanine Radice (Fordham)
- Tom Lochner (Temple)
- Jade Singleton (Duquesne)

Legend

- (C) Team captain
- (S) Suspended
- (I) Ineligible
- (W) Walk-on
- Injured
- Current redshirt

Roster

== Schedule ==
Date time, TV	Rank^{#}	Opponent^{#}	Result	Record	Site (attendance) city, state
Non-conference regular season
11/13/2016*; 2:00 pm		George Mason	W 67–51	1–0	Bob Carpenter Center (1,320); Newark, DE
11/16/2016*; 7:00 pm		at American	W 56–55 ^{OT}	2–0	Bender Arena (407); Washington, D.C.
11/19/2016*; 8:00 pm		St. Bonaventure	W 43–40	3–0	Bob Carpenter Center (1,130); Newark, DE
11/22/2016*; 7:00 pm		Princeton	W 66–62	4–0	Bob Carpenter Center (1,005); Newark, DE
11/25/2016*; 8:00 pm		vs. No. 24 Michigan State; Radisson Thanksgiving Classic	L 64–81	4–1	Matadome (218); Northridge, CA
11/26/2016*; 9:30 pm		vs. Detroit; Radisson Thanksgiving Classic	L 64–66	4–2	Matadome; Northridge, CA
12/01/2016*; 7:00 pm		Robert Morris	W 67–65	5–2	Bob Carpenter Center (1,150); Newark, DE
12/04/2016*; 2:00 pm		Georgetown	L 46–54	5–3	Bob Carpenter Center (1,368); Newark, DE
12/07/2016*; 7:00 pm		at Loyola (MD)	W 47–45	6–3	Reitz Arena (213); Baltimore, MD
12/11/2016*; 2:00 pm		Army	L 47–61	6–4	Bob Carpenter Center (1,164); Newark, DE
12/21/2016*; 7:00 pm		Hartford	L 66–67	6–5	Bob Carpenter Center (1,370); Newark, DE
CAA regular season
01/02/2017; 3:00 pm		William & Mary	L 49–60	6–6 (0–1)	Bob Carpenter Center (2,619); Newark, DE
01/06/2017; 11:30 am		at UNC Wilmington	W 63–52	7–6 (1–1)	Trask Coliseum (3,207); Wilmington, DE
01/08/2017; 2:00 pm		at Elon	L 42–69	7–7 (1–2)	Alumni Gym (303); Elon, NC
01/13/2017; 7:00 pm		James Madison	L 51–66	7–8 (1–3)	Bob Carpenter Center (1,378); Newark, DE
01/15/2017; 4:00 pm		at Hofstra	W 73–56	8–8 (2–3)	Hofstra Arena (308); Hempstead, NY
01/20/2017; 7:00 pm		Northeastern	W 65–53	9–8 (3–3)	Bob Carpenter Center (1,305); Newark, DE
01/22/2017; 2:00 pm		College of Charleston	W 71–66	10–8 (4–3)	Bob Carpenter Center (1,477); Newark, DE
01/27/2017; 7:00 pm		at William & Mary	W 68–54	11–8 (5–3)	Kaplan Arena (433); Williamsburg, VA
01/29/2017; 2:00 pm		at Towson	W 73–67	12–8 (6–3)	SECU Arena (202); Towson, MD
02/03/2017; 7:00 pm		UNC Wilmington	W 57–40	13–8 (7–3)	Bob Carpenter Center (1,326); Newark, DE
02/05/2017; 2:00 pm		Drexel	L 44–54	13–9 (7–4)	Bob Carpenter Center (1,829); Newark, DE
02/10/2017; 7:00 pm		at James Madison	L 42–77	13–10 (7–5)	JMU Convocation Center (2,428); Harrisonburg, VA
02/12/2017; 5:00 pm, ASN		Hofstra	W 56–45	14–10 (8–5)	Bob Carpenter Center (1,696); Newark, DE
02/17/2017; 7:00 pm		at Northeastern	L 41–50	14–11 (8–6)	Cabot Center (240); Boston, MA
02/19/2017; 3:00 pm, ASN		at Drexel	L 49–53	14–12 (8–7)	Daskalakis Athletic Center (640); Philadelphia, PA
02/24/2017; 7:00 pm		Elon	L 48–57	14–13 (8–8)	Bob Carpenter Center (1,718); Newark, DE
02/26/2017; 2:00 pm		at College of Charleston	W 69–56	15–13 (9–8)	TD Arena (328); Charleston, SC
03/01/2017; 7:00 pm		Towson	W 75–59	16–13 (10–8)	Bob Carpenter Center (1,496); Newark, DE
CAA Women's Tournament
03/09/2017; 2:30 pm, ASN		vs. William & Mary; Quarterfinals	L 44–59	16–14	JMU Convocation Center; Harrisonburg, VA
*Non-conference game. ^{#}Rankings from AP Poll. (#) Tournament seedings in parentheses. All times are in Eastern Time.

== See also ==
2016–17 Delaware Fightin' Blue Hens men's basketball team
