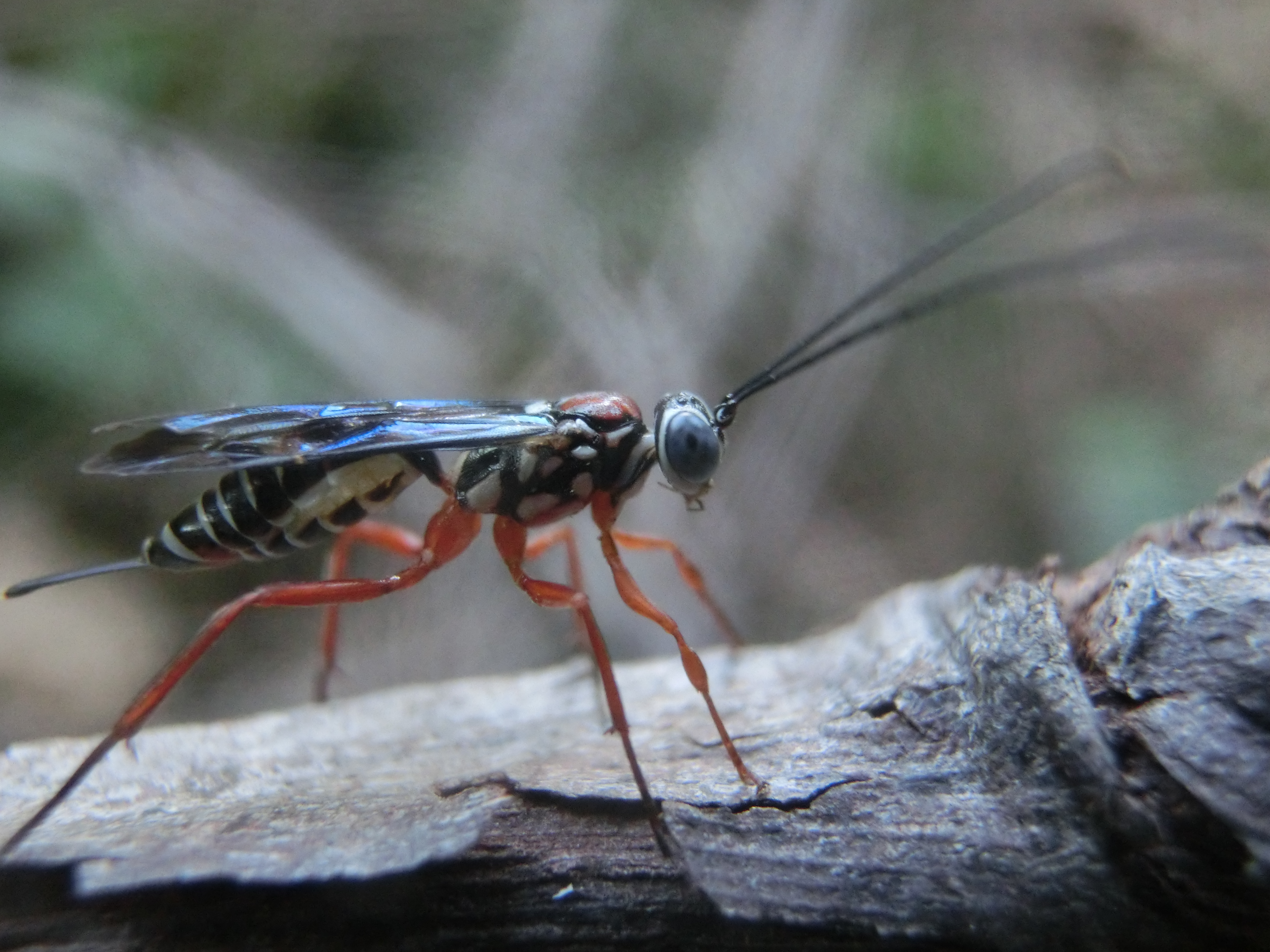
- Nesolinoceras laluzbrillante female

Scientific classification
- Kingdom: Animalia
- Phylum: Arthropoda
- Clade: Pancrustacea
- Class: Insecta
- Order: Hymenoptera
- Family: Ichneumonidae
- Genus: Nesolinoceras
- Species: N. laluzbrillante

Binomial name
- Nesolinoceras laluzbrillante Santos, 2016

= Nesolinoceras laluzbrillante =

Species of wasp

Nesolinoceras laluzbrillante is a species of ichneumon wasps. It is known from the Caribbean island of Hispaniola. The larvae are parasitoids and the host species is unknown.

== Taxonomy ==
A related species from Cuba, N. ornatipennis, was discovered first before N. laluzbrillante was described in 2016. The specific epithet laluzbrillante refers to the Spanish la luz brillante ("the bright light"), in reference to the Dominican Republic's sunny climate and the wasp's bright, glossy wings. The name was chosen by students of the Washington Heights Expeditionary Learning School.

== Description ==
The wasp has an alternating black and white coloration, with coppery brown wings and orangeish legs. Females (8.8 to 9.0 mm forewing length) are larger than males (7.2 to 8.0 mm forewing length), typical for Hymenoptera.
