= Cancún Challenge =

College basketball tournament

Cancun Challenge
- Cancun Challenge Logo

Tournament information
- Sport: College basketball
- Location: United States (campus sites); Mexico (Riviera Maya)
- Month played: November
- Established: 2005 (Women's); 2008 (Men's)
- Format: MTE
- Teams: 10 (Women's); 8 (Men's 2008–24); 6 (Men's 2025)

Current champion
- Loyola Marymount (Men's Riviera Division); Gardner–Webb (Men's Mayan Division)

The Cancun Challenge (Spanish: Desafío Cancún) is a college basketball tournament organized by Triple Crown Sports which currently features six NCAA Division I men's basketball teams and ten women's basketball teams. The formats of the men's and women's tournaments have varied from year to year. The 2025 tournament consists of teams playing in a set schedule of games at participants' campus sites and Cancún, Mexico with no bracket, and therefore no champion.

The Mexico portion of the event has been held at multiple venues in and around Cancún. The inaugural 2005 tournament was relocated from the Moon Palace Resort to the Aventura Spa Palace Resort in Playa del Carmen shortly before it was scheduled to occur due to damage sustained at the original location from Hurricane Wilma. The tournament was held at one of these two sites each year up until 2014, when it would be moved to the Hard Rock Hotel Riviera Maya, where it has been held since. CBS Sports Network televises the men's Riviera Division games. All Mexico games in the men's Mayan Division along with all women's games are streamed on FloHoops.

Previous men's champions include Vanderbilt (2008), Kentucky (2009), Missouri (2010), Illinois (2011), Wichita State (2012), Wisconsin (2013), Northern Iowa (2014), Maryland (2015), Purdue (2016), LA Tech (2017), Bradley (2018), West Virginia (2019), Clemson (2020), Saint Louis (2021) and Auburn (2022). Previous women's participating teams include marquee programs such as Arizona State, Baylor, Duke, Georgia Tech, Iowa, Iowa State, Kansas State, Maryland, Oklahoma, Purdue, Seton Hall, Stanford, UCLA, and Washington, among others.

== Brackets ==
* – Denotes overtime period

=== 2025 ===
The 2025 Cancún Challenge features teams playing in a set schedule of games.

==== Men's ====
2025 Men's Cancún Challenge
Date	Away		Home		Site	City
November 19, 2025	UC Irvine	72	79	Utah Valley	UCCU Center	Orem, UT
November 21, 2025	Georgia State	58	105	South Dakota State	First Bank and Trust Arena	Brookings, SD
November 21, 2025	Samford	72	81	New Mexico State	Pan American Center	Las Cruces, NM
November 25, 2025	Samford	78	63	Georgia State	Hard Rock Hotel Riviera Maya	Cancun, Mexico
November 25, 2025	Utah Valley	75	52	South Dakota State	Hard Rock Hotel Riviera Maya	Cancun, Mexico
November 25, 2025	New Mexico State	57	42	UC Irvine	Hard Rock Hotel Riviera Maya	Cancun, Mexico
November 26, 2025	Georgia State	58	77	New Mexico State	Hard Rock Hotel Riviera Maya	Cancun, Mexico
November 26, 2025	Samford	45	89	Utah Valley	Hard Rock Hotel Riviera Maya	Cancun, Mexico
November 26, 2025	South Dakota State	52	64	UC Irvine	Hard Rock Hotel Riviera Maya	Cancun, Mexico

==== Women's ====
2025 Women's Cancún Challenge
Date	Away		Home		Site	City
November 27, 2025	No. 12 North Carolina	83	48	South Dakota State	Hard Rock Hotel Riviera Maya	Cancún, Mexico
November 27, 2025	Columbia	92	95	Kansas State	Hard Rock Hotel Riviera Maya	Cancún, Mexico
November 27, 2025	No. 25 NC State	79	67	Green Bay	Hard Rock Hotel Riviera Maya	Cancún, Mexico
November 27, 2025	Southern Miss	72	77	UAB	Hard Rock Hotel Riviera Maya	Cancún, Mexico
November 27, 2025	Richmond	52	88	No. 8 TCU	Hard Rock Hotel Riviera Maya	Cancún, Mexico
November 28, 2025	Kansas State	73	85	No. 12 North Carolina	Hard Rock Hotel Riviera Maya	Cancún, Mexico
November 28, 2025	South Dakota State	67	80	Columbia	Hard Rock Hotel Riviera Maya	Cancún, Mexico
November 28, 2025	No. 25 NC State	110	56	Southern Miss	Hard Rock Hotel Riviera Maya	Cancún, Mexico
November 28, 2025	UAB	61	82	No. 8 TCU	Hard Rock Hotel Riviera Maya	Cancún, Mexico
November 28, 2025	Green Bay	59	76	Richmond	Hard Rock Hotel Riviera Maya	Cancún, Mexico
November 29, 2025	South Dakota State	82	70	Kansas State	Hard Rock Hotel Riviera Maya	Cancún, Mexico
November 29, 2025	No. 12 North Carolina	80	63	Columbia	Hard Rock Hotel Riviera Maya	Cancún, Mexico

=== 2024 ===
==== Men's ====
===== Riviera Division =====
Riviera Semifinals; November 26
Wyoming	64
Tulane	63
Loyola Marymount	77
Belmont	63

Riviera Championship; November 27
Wyoming	70
Loyola Marymount	73
Riviera Consolation; November 27
Tulane	66
Belmont	89

===== Mayan Division =====
Mayan Semifinals; November 26
Southeastern Louisiana	69
Gardner–Webb	73
Bethune–Cookman	79
North Dakota	67

Mayan Championship; November 27
Gardner–Webb	79
Bethune–Cookman	64
Mayan Consolation; November 27
Southeastern Louisiana	76
North Dakota	60

==== Women's ====
===== Mayan Division =====
Team	Record
San Diego State	2–1
Wisconsin	2–1
Providence	1–2
VCU	1–2

===== Riviera Division =====
Team	Record
Iowa	2–0
BYU	1–1
Idaho State	1–1
Rice	1–1
Vermont	1–1
Rhode Island	0–2

=== 2023 ===
==== Men's ====
===== Riviera Division =====
Riviera Consolation; November 22; CBS Sports Network
Southern Illinois	81
New Mexico State	54

Riviera Semifinals; November 21; CBS Sports Network
22	James Madison	82
Southern Illinois	76
Fresno State	81*
New Mexico State	76

Riviera Championship; November 22; CBS Sports Network
22	James Madison	95
Fresno State	64

===== Mayan Division =====
Mayan Consolation; November 22; Flo Hoops
Morgan State	83
Chicago State	84

Mayan Semifinals; November 21; Flo Hoops
Morgan State	72
Radford	82
Chicago State	77
Northern Colorado	78

Mayan Championship; November 22; Flo Hoops
Radford	79
Northern Colorado	68

==== Women's ====
===== Riviera Division =====
Team	Record
Creighton	2–0
Georgia Tech	1–1
James Madison	1–1
Michigan State	1–1
Montana State	1–1
New Mexico	0–2

===== Mayan Division =====
Team	Record
Maryland	2–1
Washington State	2–1
Green Bay	1–2
UMass	0–3

=== 2022 ===
==== Men's ====
===== Riviera Division =====
Riviera Semifinals; November 22; CBS Sports Network
Bradley	64
13	Auburn	85
Liberty	52
Northwestern	66

Riviera Championship; November 23; CBS Sports Network
13	Auburn	43
Northwestern	42
Riviera Consolation; November 23; CBS Sports Network
Bradley	44
Liberty	55

===== Mayan Division =====
Mayan Semifinals; November 22; FloHoops
Purdue Fort Wayne	74
Eastern Michigan	67
Southern Miss	77
Winthrop	52

Mayan Championship; November 23; FloHoops
Purdue Fort Wayne	58
Southern Miss	70
Mayan Consolation; November 23; FloHoops
Eastern Michigan	87
Winthrop	101

=== 2021 ===
==== Men's ====
===== Riviera Division =====
Riviera Semifinals; November 23; CBS Sports Network
Stephen F. Austin	79
Buffalo	78
Illinois State	76
Saint Louis	82

Riviera Championship; November 24; CBS Sports Network
Stephen F. Austin	68
Saint Louis	79
Riviera Consolation; November 24; CBS Sports Network
Buffalo	106
Illinois State	90

===== Mayan Division =====
Mayan Semifinals; November 23; FloHoops
Middle Tennessee	60
Rider	54
Bucknell	68
Mercer	78

Mayan Championship; November 24; FloHoops
Middle Tennessee	82
Mercer	58
Mayan Consolation; November 24; FloHoops
Rider	85
Bucknell	79

==== Women's ====
All games streamed on FloHoops.com

===== Mayan Division =====
Team	Record
Baylor	2–0
Houston	1–1
Arizona State	1–2
Fordham	1–2

===== Riviera Division =====
Team	Record
UCF	1–0
USC	1-1
Seton Hall	1–1
Toledo	1–1
Idaho State	0–2
Iowa	0–0

=== 2020 Space Coast Classic ===
Due to COVID-19 pandemic the 2020 Cancún Challenge was not held, instead a 4 team tournament was branded as the Space Coast Challenge, games were played at Titan Field House in Melbourne, FL.

Semifinals; November 24; CBS Sports Network
Clemson	53
Mississippi State	42
Liberty	64
Purdue	77

Championship; November 25; CBS Sports Network
Clemson	81
Purdue	70
Consolation; November 25; CBS Sports Network
Mississippi State	73
Liberty	84

=== 2019 ===
==== Men's ====
===== Riviera Division =====
Riviera Semifinals; November 26; CBS Sports Network
Wichita State	70
South Carolina	47
Northern Iowa	55
West Virginia	60

Riviera Championship; November 27; CBS Sports Network
Wichita State	63
West Virginia	74
Riviera Consolation; November 27; CBS Sports Network
South Carolina	72
Northern Iowa	78

===== Mayan Division =====
Mayan Semifinals; November 26; FloHoops
UT Martin	64
Gardner–Webb	81
Boston University	55
Northern Colorado	78

Mayan Championship; November 27; FloHoops
Gardner–Webb	67
Northern Colorado	63
Mayan Consolation; November 27; FloHoops
UT Martin	76
Boston University	73

==== Women's ====
===== Riviera Division =====
Team	Record
Creighton	2–0
North Carolina	2–0
New Mexico	1–1
West Virginia	1–1
Missouri	0–2
Temple	0–2

===== Mayan Division =====
Team	Record
Florida Gulf Coast	3–0
South Dakota State	2–1
Notre Dame	1–2
South Florida	0–3

=== 2018 ===
==== Men's ====
===== Riviera Division =====
Riviera Semifinals; November 20; CBS Sports Network
Bradley	75
SMU	62
Wright State	59
Penn State	77

Riviera Championship; November 21; CBS Sports Network
Bradley	59
Penn State	56
Riviera Consolation; November 21; CBS Sports Network
SMU	77
Wright State	76

===== Mayan Division =====
Mayan Semifinals; November 20
Western Carolina	53
Jacksonville State	84
North Florida	64
Southern Miss	48

Mayan Championship; November 21
Jacksonville State	83
North Florida	78
Mayan Consolation; November 21
Western Carolina	63
Southern Miss	68

==== Riviera Division ====
Team	Record
NC State	2–0
Georgia Tech	2–0
Idaho State	1–1
Michigan State	1–1
Kennesaw State	0–2
George Washington	0–2

==== Mayan Division ====
Team	Record
Syracuse	3–0
DePaul	2–1
Kansas State	1–2
Princeton	0–3

=== 2017 ===
==== Men's ====
===== Riviera Division =====
Riviera Semifinals; November 21; CBS Sports Network
George Mason	64
Louisiana Tech	77
Fresno State	57
Evansville	59

Riviera Championship game November 22; CBS Sports Network
Louisiana Tech	63
Evansville	61
Riviera Consolation; November 22; CBS Sports Network
George Mason	75
Fresno State	79

===== Mayan Division =====
Mayan Semifinals; November 21
Binghamton	64
Montana State	74
Cal State Northridge	59
Southeast Missouri State	74

Mayan Championship; November 22
Montana State	88
Southeast Missouri State	82
Mayan Consolation; November 22; CBS Sports Network
Binghamton	70
Cal State Northridge	65

==== Women's ====
===== Riviera Division =====
Team	Record
Tennessee	3–0
Indiana State	1–1
Marquette	1–1
Oklahoma State	1–1
South Dakota	1–2
Montana	0–2

===== Mayan Division =====
Team	Record
Mississippi State	3–0
Green Bay	2–1
Arizona State	1–2
Columbia	0–3

=== 2016 ===
==== Men's ====
===== Riviera Division =====
Riviera Semifinals; November 22; CBSSN
Auburn	67
Texas Tech	65
Utah State	64
15	Purdue	85

Riviera Championship game November 23; CBSSN
Auburn	71
15	Purdue	96
Riviera Consolation; November 23; CBSSN
Texas Tech	75
Utah State	51

===== Mayan Division =====
Mayan Semifinals; November 22
NJIT	53
Georgia State	74
Idaho State	82
Eastern Kentucky	91*

Mayan Championship; November 23
Georgia State	82
Eastern Kentucky	65
Mayan Consolation; November 23
NJIT	71
Idaho State	67

==== Women's ====
===== Riviera Division =====
Team	Record
UCLA	2–0
Idaho State	1–1
Iowa	1–1
James Madison	1–1
Toledo	1–1
Davidson	0–2

===== Mayan Division =====
Team	Record
Stanford	3–0
Purdue	2–1
Wichita State	1–2
Northeastern	0–3

=== 2015 ===
==== Men's ====
===== Riviera Division =====
Riviera Semifinals; November 24; CBSSN
Rhode Island	66
TCU	60
Illinois State	66
2	Maryland	77

Riviera Championship game November 25; CBSSN
Rhode Island	63
2	Maryland	86
Riviera Consolation; November 25; CBSSN
TCU	71
Illinois State	60

===== Mayan Division =====
Mayan Semifinals; November 24
Cleveland State	57
Rider	52
Houston Baptist	68
South Dakota State	92

Mayan Championship; November 25
Cleveland State	68
South Dakota State	77
Mayan Consolation; November 27
Rider	67
Houston Baptist	56

==== Women's ====
===== Riviera Division =====
Team	Record
Seton Hall	2–0
Georgia Tech	1–1
NC State	1–1
Northern Iowa	1–1
UAB	1–1
High Point	0–2

===== Mayan Division =====
Team	Record
Duke	3–0
Idaho	2–1
Iowa State	1–2
Texas State	0–3

=== 2014 ===
==== Men's ====
===== Riviera Division =====
Riviera Semifinals; November 25; CBS Sports Network
Virginia Tech	54
Northern Iowa	73
Miami (OH)	46
Northwestern	55

Riviera Championship; November 26; CBS Sports Network
Northern Iowa	61
Northwestern	42
Consolation; November 27; CBS Sports Network
Virginia Tech	78
Miami (OH)	63

===== Mayan Division =====
Mayan Semifinals; November 25
Morgan State	73
Elon	74
North Florida	77
Liberty	57

Mayan Championship; November 26
Elon	65
North Florida	72
Consolation; November 27
Morgan State	51
Liberty	50

==== Women's ====
===== Riviera Division =====
Team	Record
Washington	3–0
Florida State	2–1
Furman	1–2
Hartford	0–3

===== Mayan Division =====
Team	Record
Princeton	3–0
Wake Forest	2–1
Montana	1–2
Charlotte	0–3

=== 2013 ===
==== Men's ====
===== Riviera Division =====
Riviera Semifinals; November 26
West Virginia	78
Old Dominion	60
Wisconsin	63
Saint Louis	57

Riviera Championship; November 27
West Virginia	63
Wisconsin	70
Consolation; November 27
Old Dominion	52
Saint Louis	62

===== Mayan Division =====
Mayan Semifinals; November 26
Presbyterian	45
Bowling Green	67
Oral Roberts	67
Georgia Southern	65

Mayan Championship; November 27
Bowling Green	56
Oral Roberts	63
Consolation; November 27
Presbyterian	64
Georgia Southern	78

==== Women's ====
===== Riviera Division =====
Team	Record
Arizona State	3–0
North Carolina	2–1
Illinois	1–2
Arkansas State	0–3

===== Mayan Division =====
Team	Record
Iowa	3–0
USC	2–1
Boston College	1–2
UNC Wilmington	0–3

=== 2012 ===
==== Men's ====
===== Riviera Division =====
Riviera Semifinals; November 20
DePaul	62
Wichita State	75
Iowa	63
Western Kentucky	55

Riviera Championship; November 21
Wichita State	75
Iowa	63
Consolation; November 21
DePaul	61
Western Kentucky	70

===== Mayan Division =====
Mayan Semifinals; November 20
Austin Peay	72
Western Carolina	71
Howard	43
Gardner–Webb	55

Mayan Championship; November 21
Austin Peay	62
Gardner–Webb	72
Consolation; November 21
Western Carolina	69
Howard	67

=== 2011 ===
==== Men's ====
===== Riviera Division =====
Riviera Semifinals; November 22
Rutgers	70
Illinois State	76
Richmond	61
Illinois	70

Riviera Championship; November 23
Illinois State	59
Illinois	63
Consolation; November 23
Rutgers	53
Richmond	58

===== Mayan Division =====
Mayan Semifinals; November 22
SIU Edwardsville	87
Lipscomb	90
Hampton	71
Sacred Heart	78

Mayan Championship; November 23
Lipscomb	79
Sacred Heart	77
Consolation; November 23
SIU Edwardsville	64
Hampton	68

=== 2010 ===
==== Men's ====
===== Riviera Division =====
Riviera Semifinals; November 23
Wyoming	62
Missouri	72
La Salle	84
Providence	73

Riviera Championship; November 24
Missouri	83
La Salle	71
Consolation; November 24
Wyoming	77
Providence	84

==== Mayan Division ====
Mayan Semifinals; November 23
Western Illinois	53
Morgan State	72
Prairie View A&M	66
North Florida	84

Mayan Championship; November 24
Morgan State	52
North Florida	59
Consolation; November 24
Western Illinois	69
Prairie View A&M	63

=== 2009 ===
==== Men's ====
===== Riviera Division =====
Riviera Semifinals; November 24
Kentucky	73
Cleveland State	49
Stanford	57
Virginia	52

Riviera Championship; November 25
Kentucky	73*
Stanford	65
Consolation; November 25
Cleveland State	65
Virginia	76

===== Mayan Division =====
Mayan Semifinals; November 24
Oral Roberts	65
Sam Houston State	71
Florida A&M	73
Rider	88

Mayan Championship; November 25
Sam Houston State	80
Rider	68
Consolation; November 25
Oral Roberts	72
Florida A&M	51

=== 2008 ===
==== Men's ====
===== Riviera Division =====
Semifinals; November 29
Vanderbilt	72
Drake	57
VCU	67
New Mexico	57

Championship; November 30
Vanderbilt	71
VCU	66
Consolation; November 30
Drake	68
New Mexico	62
