= Washington Heights Expeditionary Learning School =

Public school in New York City

Coordinates: 40.8492°N 73.9310°W

Information
- Established: 2006; 20 years ago
- Grades: Pre-Kindergarten - Grade 12
- Enrollment: c.800 (2017)

Washington Heights Expeditionary Learning School (WHEELS) is a public school in Washington Heights, Manhattan, New York City, serving grades PreK -12. It is a part of the New York City Department of Education (NYCDOE).

== History ==
The school opened in 2006, and initially it had 150 students in grades six through twelve. Its first class, in June 2012, had one hundred percent college acceptance. Brett Kimmel was the first principal. As of 2012 the school had 600 students; 98% of the students were Hispanic and Latino, with most of them being Dominican American and/or born in the Dominican Republic. WHEELS opened a Lower Grades to serve PreK - 5 in 2014 and expanded each year to become a PreK - 12. As of 2017, it had apperoximately 800 students.
