= Hofstra Pride women's basketball =

| 2025–26 Hofstra Pride women's basketball team |
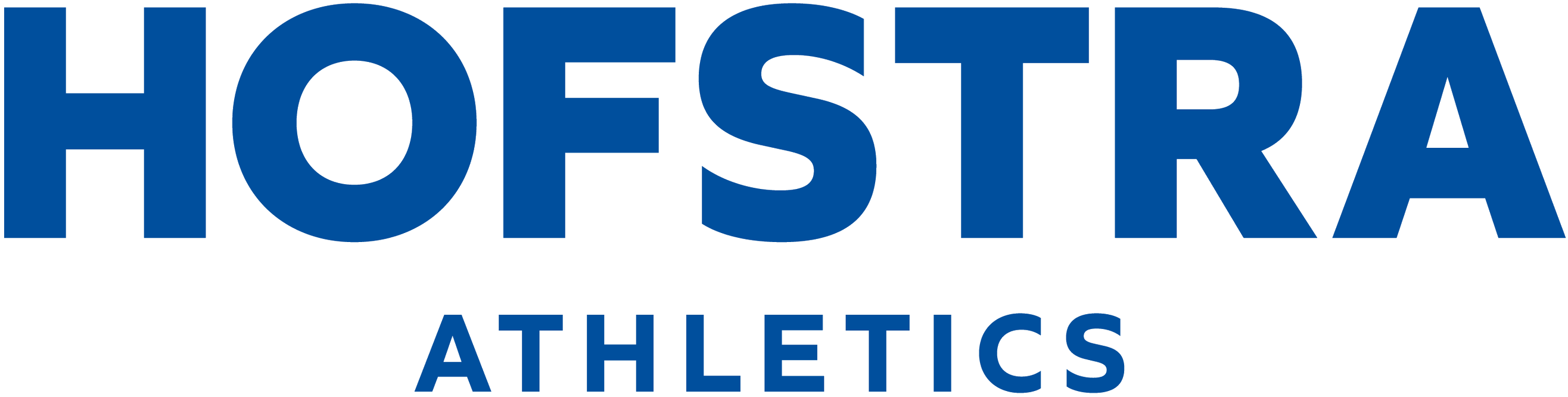
- University: Hofstra University
- Head coach: Danielle Santos Atkinson (7th season)
- Location: Hempstead, New York
- Arena: David S. Mack Sports and Exhibition Complex (capacity: 5,142)
- Conference: Coastal Athletic Association
- Nickname: Pride
- Colors: Blue, white, and gold
- Student section: The Lion’s Den

AIAW tournament appearances
- Division II: 1980

Uniforms
| Home | Away |

The Hofstra Pride women's basketball team is the basketball team that represents Hofstra University in Hempstead, New York, United States. The school's team currently competes in the Coastal Athletic Association.

== History ==
The Pride has made eight appearances in postseason play, two being in the AIAW Division II National Tournament (1980, 1982) and four being in the WNIT (2006, 2007, 2010, 2011, 2015, 2016). They beat Stony Brook 92–65 for their first ever postseason win before losing to Villanova 71–46 in the next round. They made the Quarterfinals in 2007 and 2016.

== Players ==
=== Retired numbers ===
Hofstra Pride women's basketball retired numbers
| No. | Player | Tenure | Ref. |
| 14 | Liz Irwin | 1978–82 | |
| 15 | Dia LaBella | 1978–82 | |
| 30 | Shante Evans | 2010–13 | |

== Postseason ==
=== AIAW College Division/Division II ===
The Pride, then known as the Flying Dutchmen, made one appearance in the AIAW National Division II Basketball Tournament, with a combined record of 0–1.

| Year | Round | Opponent | Result |
|---|---|---|---|
| 1980 | First Round | Morgan State | L, 52–62 |
