= JMU Convocation Center =

Building in Virginia, United States

Coordinates: 38.4318918°N 78.868854°W

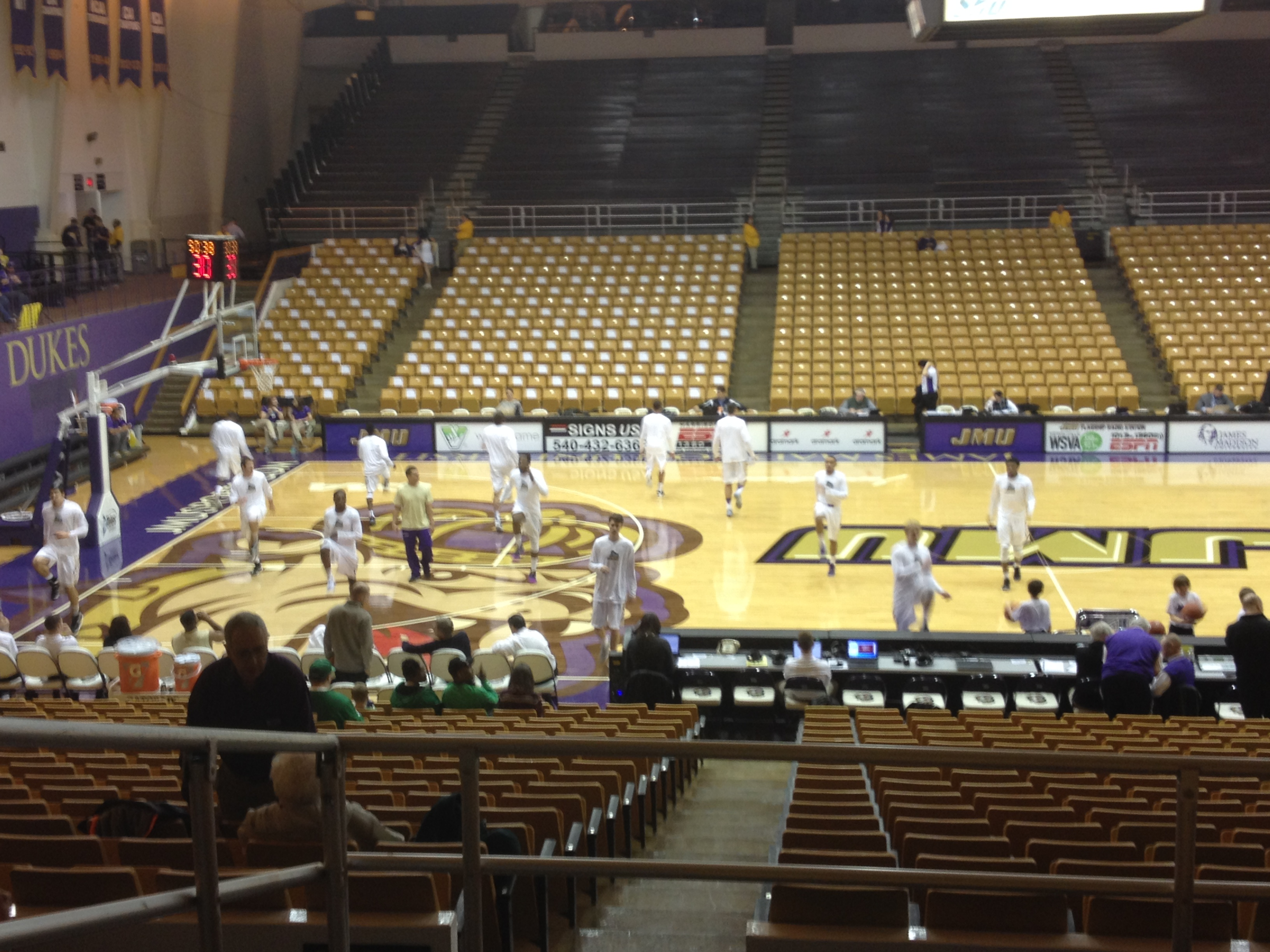
The Convocation Center, set up for basketball

The JMU Convocation Center is a 6,426-seat multi-purpose arena in Harrisonburg, Virginia. The arena opened in 1982, and was home to the James Madison Dukes men's basketball and James Madison Dukes women's basketball teams through the 2019–20 season. It hosted the 1984 ECAC South men's basketball tournament (now known as the Coastal Athletic Association).

It was one of the rotating host venues for the Coastal Athletic Association women's basketball tournament, having hosted the tournament six times since 1987. JMU's University Program Board (UPB) hosts concerts at the Convocation center each semester. Past concerts have included: The Kinks, Third Eye Blind, Jason Derulo, Wale, Wiz Khalifa, Macklemore, and Big Sean. The Convocation Center also hosts numerous other functions including the winter commencement ceremony.

The Convocation Center hosted its last basketball games in February 2020. The Dukes moved into the 8,500-seat Atlantic Union Bank Center for the 2020–21 season. The Convocation Center was converted into practice facilities and home court for the Dukes women's volleyball team.
