= Immaculate Conception Ukrainian Catholic High School =

Immaculate Conception Ukrainian High School

Location
- 29500 Westbrook; Warren, Michigan; United States
- Coordinates: 42°30′31″N 83°04′48″W

Information
- School type: Parochial
- Motto: Προς νε τους ους - for the Youth. Omnia per Mariam - all things through Mary.
- Established: 1959
- Status: closed
- Closed: 2008
- Headmaster: Lesia Lawrin
- Grades: K-12
- Colors: Blue and silver
- Mascot: Bengal Tiger
- Newspaper: Luna
- Website: http://www.icschools.org

Immaculate Conception Ukrainian High School was a private, Ukrainian Catholic high school in Warren, Michigan.

== History ==
Immaculate Conception Ukrainian High School was established in 1959. It was the first Ukrainian Catholic co-educational high school in the United States.

It was closed in 2008, primarily due to budgetary constraints. It was associated with the Immaculate Conception Ukrainian Catholic Church.

== Notable people ==
- Sister Emellia Prokopik, principal before becoming Academic Dean at Manor College.
- Wally Palmar, frontman of The Romantics
