= Saint Basil Academy =

Saint Basil Academy may refer to:

- Saint Basil Academy (Garrison, New York)
- Saint Basil Academy (Jenkintown, Pennsylvania)
