= 2017–18 Holy Cross Crusaders women's basketball team =

Intercollegiate basketball season

2017–18 Holy Cross Crusaders women's basketball
- Conference: Patriot League
- Record: 12–18 (7–11 Patriot)
- Head coach: Bill Gibbons (33rd season)
- Assistant coaches: Ann McInerney; Danielle Parks; Matt Raquet
- Home arena: Hart Center

2017–18 Patriot League women's basketball standings
	Conf.				Overall
Team	W		L	PCT	W		L	PCT
American †	16	–	2	.889	26	–	7	.788
Bucknell	15	–	3	.833	22	–	10	.688
Navy	13	–	5	.722	25	–	8	.758
Army	9	–	9	.500	17	–	14	.548
Lehigh	9	–	9	.500	15	–	15	.500
Holy Cross	7	–	11	.389	12	–	18	.400
Loyola (MD)	7	–	11	.389	9	–	21	.300
Lafayette	6	–	12	.333	11	–	19	.367
Boston University	5	–	13	.278	10	–	19	.345
Colgate	3	–	15	.167	7	–	23	.233
† 2018 Patriot League tournament winner As of 16 March 2018; Rankings from AP poll

The 2017–18 Holy Cross Crusaders women's basketball team represented the College of the Holy Cross during the 2017–18 NCAA Division I women's basketball season. The Crusaders, led by thirty-third year head coach Bill Gibbons, played their home games at the Hart Center and were members of the Patriot League. They finished the season 12–18, 7–11 in Patriot League play to finish in a tie for sixth place. They advanced to the quarterfinals of the Patriot League women's tournament, where they lost to Bucknell.

== Previous season ==
They finished the season 8–21, 6–12 in Patriot League play to finish in a tie for seventh place. They lost in the first round of the Patriot League women's tournament to Lafayette.

== Roster ==
2017–18 Holy Cross Crusaders women's basketball team
Players
Coaches

Pos.	#	Name	Height	Year	Previous school	Hometown
G	1	Tricia Byrne	5 ft 7 in (1.7 m)	Sr	Scranton Prep	Dunmore, PA
G	3	Infiniti Thomas-Waheed	5 ft 10 in (1.78 m)	Sr	Newton North	Newton, MA
G	4	Jenay Faulkner	5 ft 11 in (1.8 m)	Fr	Greencastle-Antrim	Greencastle, PA
G	5	Katie Doherty	5 ft 10 in (1.78 m)	Sr	Sachem East	Holbrook, NY
G	10	Megan Swords	6 ft 3 in (1.91 m)	So	Immaculate Heart Academy	Glen Rock NJ
G	11	Shannon Druck	5 ft 8 in (1.73 m)	Sr	Susquehannock	New Freedom, PA
G	12	Madalyn Smith	5 ft 8 in (1.73 m)	So	High Point Regional	Sussex, NJ
G/F	14	Kathryn Pedi	5 ft 9 in (1.75 m)	So	New Trier	Wilmette, IL
G	21	Mia Mazza	5 ft 8 in (1.73 m)	Fr	St. Francis	Glen Ellyn, IL
G	22	Nicole Morris	5 ft 8 in (1.73 m)	So	Rumson-Fair Haven Regional	Rumson, NJ
F	23	Maggie Locke	6 ft 1 in (1.85 m)	Jr	Spring-Ford	Collegeville, PA
F	25	Lauren Manis	6 ft 1 in (1.85 m)	So	Bishop Feehan	Franklin, MA
C	33	Shannon Murphy	6 ft 1 in (1.85 m)	Fr	Watertown	Watertown, MA
F	41	Amy Hasenauer	6 ft 2 in (1.88 m)	Sr	Hilton	Greece, NY
C	55	Miranda Nixon	6 ft 3 in (1.91 m)	Jr	Trinity	Harrisburg, PA

Head coach

- Bill Gibbons (Clark)

Assistant coach(es)

- Ann McInerney (Assumption (MA))
- Danielle Parks (Adelphi)
- Matt Raquet (Pittsburgh)

Legend

- (C) Team captain
- (S) Suspended
- (I) Ineligible
- (W) Walk-on
- Injured
- Current redshirt

Roster
Last update: January 6, 2018

== Schedule ==
Date time, TV	Rank^{#}	Opponent^{#}	Result	Record	Site (attendance) city, state
Exhibition
11/04/2017*; 12:05 pm		Assumption	W 64–41		Hart Center (861); Worcester, MA
Non-conference regular season
11/12/2017*; 4:00 pm, ESPN3		at UMass Lowell	W 84–56	1–0	Tsongas Center (492); Lowell, MA
11/14/2017*; 7:00 pm		at Marist	L 74–85	1–1	McCann Field House (1,382); Poughkeepsie, NY
11/18/2017*; 2:00 pm		at Rider	W 83–56	2–1	Alumni Gymnasium (505); Lawrenceville, NJ
11/21/2017*; 7:00 pm		at Hofstra	L 63–69	2–2	Hofstra Arena (277); Hempstead, NY
11/26/2017*; 12:05 pm		Bryant	W 59–57 ^{OT}	3–2	Hart Center (1,047); Worcester, MA
11/29/2017*; 7:00 pm		at Brown	L 78–82	3–3	Pizzitola Sports Center (237); Providence, RI
12/03/2017*; 12:05 pm		Albany	L 56–65	3–4	Hart Center (965); Worcester, MA
12/06/2017*; 7:05 pm		Boston College	L 66–70	3–5	Hart Center (987); Worcester, MA
12/09/2017*; 12:05 pm		Vermont	W 63–54	4–5	Hart Center (833); Worcester, MA
12/17/2017*; 2:00 pm		at Rhode Island	W 69–63	5–5	Ryan Center (407); Kingston, RI
12/20/2017*; 11:05 am		Dartmouth	L 74–76 ^{OT}	5–6	Hart Center (2,312); Worcester, MA
Patriot League regular season
12/29/2017; 7:00 pm		at Colgate	W 71–64	6–6 (1–0)	Cotterell Court (302); Hamilton, NY
01/02/2018; 7:05 pm		Lafayette	L 65–69	6–7 (1–1)	Hart Center (704); Worcester, MA
01/05/2018; 6:05 pm		Lehigh	W 54–49	7–7 (2–1)	Hart Center (710); Worcester, MA
01/08/2018; 7:00 pm		at Loyola (MD)	L 60–77	7–8 (2–2)	Reitz Arena (105); Baltimore, MD
01/11/2018; 7:05 pm		Navy	L 58–65	7–9 (2–3)	Hart Center (886); Worcester, MA
01/13/2018; 2:00 pm		at Boston University; Rivalry	W 60–57	8–9 (3–3)	Case Gym (376); Boston, MA
01/17/2018; 7:00 pm		at Army	W 70–62 ^{OT}	9–9 (4–3)	Christl Arena (463); West Point, NY
01/20/2018; 1:05 pm		Bucknell	L 47–71	9–10 (4–4)	Hart Center (805); Worcester, MA
01/24/2018; 1:05 pm		American	L 63–68 ^{OT}	9–11 (4–5)	Hart Center (933); Worcester, MA
01/27/2018; 2:00 pm		at Lafayette	W 69–56	10–11 (5–5)	Kirby Sports Center (1,012); Easton, PA
02/03/2018; 1:05 pm		Loyola (MD)	L 58–65	10–12 (5–6)	Hart Center (1,143); Worcester, MA
02/07/2018; 7:00 pm		at Navy	L 54–62	10–13 (5–7)	Alumni Hall (1,368); Annapolis, MD
02/10/2018; 1:05 pm		Boston University; Rivalry	L 49–62	10–14 (5–8)	Hart Center (1,059); Worcester, MA
02/14/2018; 7:05 pm		Army	L 57–66	10–15 (5–9)	Hart Center (889); Worcester, MA
02/17/2018; 2:00 pm		at Bucknell	L 63–72	10–16 (5–10)	Sojka Pavilion (945); Lewisburg, PA
02/21/2018; 11:30 am		at American	L 54–72	10–17 (5–11)	Bender Arena (514); Washington, D.C.
02/24/2018; 1:05 pm		Colgate	W 61–52	11–17 (6–11)	Hart Center (1,080); Worcester, MA
02/28/2018; 6:00 pm		at Lehigh	W 65–62	12–17 (7–11)	Stabler Arena (642); Bethlehem, PA
Patriot League Women's Tournament
03/03/2018; 1:00 pm	(7)	(10) Colgate; First Round	W 66–47	12–17	Hart Center (537); Worcester, MA
03/05/2018; 6:00 pm	(7)	at (2) Bucknell; Quarterfinals	L 53–67	12–18	Sojka Pavilion (594); Lewisburg, PA
*Non-conference game. ^{#}Rankings from AP Poll. (#) Tournament seedings in parentheses. All times are in Eastern Time.

== See also ==
- 2017–18 Holy Cross Crusaders men's basketball team
