= 2017–18 Boston University Terriers women's basketball team =

Intercollegiate basketball season

2017–18 Boston University Terriers women's basketball
- Conference: Patriot League
- Record: 10–19 (5–13 Patriot)
- Head coach: Katy Steding (4th season)
- Assistant coaches: Cindy Blodgett; Jenny Thigpin; Ben Chase
- Home arena: Case Gym

2017–18 Patriot League women's basketball standings
	Conf.				Overall
Team	W		L	PCT	W		L	PCT
American †	16	–	2	.889	26	–	7	.788
Bucknell	15	–	3	.833	22	–	10	.688
Navy	13	–	5	.722	25	–	8	.758
Army	9	–	9	.500	17	–	14	.548
Lehigh	9	–	9	.500	15	–	15	.500
Holy Cross	7	–	11	.389	12	–	18	.400
Loyola (MD)	7	–	11	.389	9	–	21	.300
Lafayette	6	–	12	.333	11	–	19	.367
Boston University	5	–	13	.278	10	–	19	.345
Colgate	3	–	15	.167	7	–	23	.233
† 2018 Patriot League tournament winner As of 16 March 2018; Rankings from AP poll

The 2017–18 Boston University Terriers women's basketball team represented Boston University during the 2017–18 NCAA Division I women's basketball season. The Terries, led by fourth year head coach Katy Steding, played their home games at Case Gym and were members of the Patriot League. They finished the season 10–19, 5–13 in Patriot League play to finish in ninth place. They lost in the first round of the Patriot League women's tournament to Lafayette.

On March 13, head coach Katy Steding was fired. She finished at Boston University with four year record of 31–88.

== Previous season ==
They finished the season 13–17, 11–7 in Patriot League play to finish in a tie for fourth place. They lost in the quarterfinals of the Patriot League women's tournament to American.

== Roster ==
2017–18 Boston University Terriers women's basketball team
Players
Coaches

Pos.	#	Name	Height	Year	Previous school	Hometown
C	1	Sophie Beaudry	6 ft 5 in (1.96 m)	RS Sr	Dawson College; Monmouth	Chambly, QE
G	2	Katie Nelson	5 ft 8 in (1.73 m)	Fr	Bishop Feehan	Falmouth, MA
F	3	Naiyah Thompson	5 ft 11 in (1.8 m)	Jr	St. Mary's Ryken	Leonard, MD
G	4	Payton Hauck	5 ft 9 in (1.75 m)	Jr	Northeastern	York, PA
G	11	Meghan Doogan	5 ft 9 in (1.75 m)	Sr	Concord	Claymont, DE
F	20	Nia Irving	6 ft 1 in (1.85 m)	So	Lawrence	Fairfield, ME
G	21	Lauren Spearman	5 ft 7 in (1.7 m)	Jr	Marlborough School	Los Angeles, CA
G	22	Corrine Williams	6 ft 1 in (1.85 m)	Sr	Bloomfield	Bloomfield, CT
G	23	Tenisha Pressley	5 ft 9 in (1.75 m)	Fr	Gloucester Catholic	Deptford, NJ
G	30	Vanessa Edgehill	5 ft 8 in (1.73 m)	So	The Rivers School	Franklin, MA
F	34	Erin Bayram	6 ft 2 in (1.88 m)	Sr	Batavia	Batavia, IL
F	52	Kara Sheftic	6 ft 1 in (1.85 m)	Sr	Essex	Essex Junction, VT
F	55	Mackenzie Miers	6 ft 2 in (1.88 m)	Fr	Easton Area	Easton, PA

Head coach

- Katy Steding (Stanford)

Assistant coach(es)

- Cindy Blodgett (Maine)
- Jenny Thigpin (Fresno State)
- Ben Chase (Emerson)

Legend

- (C) Team captain
- (S) Suspended
- (I) Ineligible
- (W) Walk-on
- Injured
- Current redshirt

Roster
Last update: January 6, 2018

== Schedule ==
Date time, TV	Rank^{#}	Opponent^{#}	Result	Record	Site (attendance) city, state
Non-conference regular season
11/10/2017*; 5:30 pm		Northeastern	W 74–73	1–0	Case Gym (1,535); Boston, MA
11/15/2017*; 7:00 pm		at New Hampshire	L 57–74	1–1	Lundholm Gym (319); Durham, NH
11/19/2017*; 2:00 pm		at Delaware	W 85–79 ^{OT}	2–1	Bob Carpenter Center (1,330); Newark, DE
11/21/2017*; 6:00 pm		at Harvard	L 70–80	2–2	Lavietes Pavilion (478); Cambridge, MA
11/26/2017*; 1:00 pm		Boston College; Green Line Rivalry	W 61–57	3–2	Case Gym (335); Boston, MA
11/29/2017*; 6:00 pm		at Bryant	W 78–61	4–2	Chace Athletic Center (321); Smithfield, RI
12/03/2017*; 2:00 pm		at Vermont	W 57–41	5–2	Patrick Gym (522); Burlington, VT
12/09/2017*; 2:00 pm		Marist	L 52–80	5–3	Case Gym (307); Boston, MA
12/13/2017*; 7:00 pm		UCF	L 32–47	5–4	Case Gym (301); Boston, MA
12/22/2017*; 1:00 pm, NESN+		at Brown	L 68–92	5–5	Pizzitola Sports Center (751); Providence, RI
Patriot League regular season
12/29/2017; 3:00 pm		at Army	W 60–59	6–5 (1–0)	Christl Arena (605); West Point, NY
01/02/2018; 2:00 pm		Bucknell	L 58–63	6–6 (1–1)	Case Gym (174); Boston, MA
01/05/2018; 7:00 pm		Loyola (MD)	W 75–56	7–6 (2–1)	Case Gym (148); Boston, MA
01/08/2018; 6:00 pm		at Lehigh	L 58–74	7–7 (2–2)	Stabler Arena (501); Bethlehem, PA
01/11/2018; 12:00 pm		at Colgate	W 62–49	8–7 (3–2)	Cotterell Court (1,342); Hamilton, NY
01/13/2018; 2:00 pm		Holy Cross; Rivalry	L 57–60	8–8 (3–3)	Case Gym (376); Boston, MA
01/17/2018; 7:00 pm		at American	L 50–66	8–9 (3–4)	Bender Arena (436); Washington, D.C.
01/20/2018; 2:00 pm		Navy	L 59–64	8–10 (3–5)	Case Gym (484); Boston, MA
01/24/2018; 7:00 pm		Lafayette	L 45–47	8–11 (3–6)	Case Gym (187); Boston, MA
01/27/2018; 2:00 pm		at Bucknell	L 57–67	8–12 (3–7)	Sojka Pavilion (805); Lewisburg, PA
02/03/2018; 2:00 pm		Lehigh	L 56–65	8–13 (3–8)	Case Gym (307); Boston, MA
02/07/2018; 7:00 pm		Colgate	W 66–64 ^{OT}	9–13 (4–8)	Case Gym (393); Boston, MA
02/10/2018; 1:00 pm		at Holy Cross; Rivalry	W 62–49	10–13 (5–8)	Hart Center (1,059); Worcester, MA
02/14/2018; 7:00 pm		American	L 54–61	10–14 (5–9)	Case Gym (211); Boston, MA
02/17/2018; 5:30 pm		at Navy	L 48–59	10–15 (5–10)	Alumni Hall (881); Annapolis, MD
02/21/2018; 7:00 pm		at Lafayette	L 41–44	10–16 (5–11)	Kirby Sports Center (347); Easton, PA
02/24/2018; 2:00 pm		Army	L 47–48	10–17 (5–12)	Case Gym (407); Boston, MA
02/28/2018; 7:00 pm		at Loyola (MD)	L 52–65	10–18 (5–13)	Reitz Arena (305); Baltimore, MD
Patriot League Women's Tournament
03/03/2018; 2:00 pm	(9)	at (8) Lafayette; First Round	L 49–58	10–19	Kirby Sports Center (435); Easton, PA
*Non-conference game. ^{#}Rankings from AP Poll. (#) Tournament seedings in parentheses. All times are in Eastern Time.

== See also ==
- 2017–18 Boston University Terriers men's basketball team
