= 2017–18 Lafayette Leopards women's basketball team =

Intercollegiate basketball season

2017–18 Lafayette Leopards women's basketball
- Conference: Patriot League
- Record: 11–19 (6–11 Patriot)
- Head coach: Kia Damon (1st season)
- Assistant coaches: Tom Lochner; Natalie Jarrett; Jennifer Montoya
- Home arena: Kirby Sports Center

2017–18 Patriot League women's basketball standings
	Conf.				Overall
Team	W		L	PCT	W		L	PCT
American †	16	–	2	.889	26	–	7	.788
Bucknell	15	–	3	.833	22	–	10	.688
Navy	13	–	5	.722	25	–	8	.758
Army	9	–	9	.500	17	–	14	.548
Lehigh	9	–	9	.500	15	–	15	.500
Holy Cross	7	–	11	.389	12	–	18	.400
Loyola (MD)	7	–	11	.389	9	–	21	.300
Lafayette	6	–	12	.333	11	–	19	.367
Boston University	5	–	13	.278	10	–	19	.345
Colgate	3	–	15	.167	7	–	23	.233
† 2018 Patriot League tournament winner As of 16 March 2018; Rankings from AP poll

The 2017–18 Lafayette Leopards women's basketball team represented Lafayette College during the 2017–18 NCAA Division I women's basketball season. The Leopards, led by first year head coach Kia Damon, played their home games at Kirby Sports Center and were members of the Patriot League. They finished the season 11–19, 6–11 in Patriot League play to finish in eighth place. They advanced to the quarterfinals of the Patriot League women's tournament, where they lost to American.

== Previous season ==
They finished the season 4–28, 2–16 in Patriot League play to finish in last place. They advanced to the quarterfinals of the Patriot League women's tournament where they lost to Navy.

== Roster ==
2017–18 Lafayette Leopards women's basketball team
Players
Coaches

Pos.	#	Name	Height	Year	Previous school	Hometown
G	2	Nia Holland	5 ft 6 in (1.68 m)	Jr	Shipley School	Landsdowne, PA
G	3	Drew Freeland	5 ft 8 in (1.73 m)	Fr	Hidden Valley	Roanoke, VA
G	5	Anna Ptasinski	5 ft 10 in (1.78 m)	Sr	Regis Jesuit	Highlands Ranch, CO
G	11	Alex Cantwell	5 ft 10 in (1.78 m)	Jr	North Shore	Glen Head, NY
G	13	Sarah Agnello	5 ft 10 in (1.78 m)	So	Villa Maria Academy	Erie, PA
G/F	21	Olivia Martino	5 ft 10 in (1.78 m)	Fr	National Christian Academy	Lanham, MD
G	22	Sammy Stipa	5 ft 5 in (1.65 m)	Sr	Spring-Ford	Royersford, PA
F	24	Alexis Santarelli	6 ft 2 in (1.88 m)	So	Bishop Eustace Prep	Philadelphia, PA
F	25	Natalie Kucowski	6 ft 3 in (1.91 m)	Fr	Saint Basil Academy	Philadelphia, PA
G	31	Sydney Sabino	5 ft 8 in (1.73 m)	So	Rumson-Fair Haven	Rumson, NJ
G/F	34	Tasha Vipond	6 ft 2 in (1.88 m)	So	Ankeny Centennial	Ankeny, IA
C	42	Ellen Graham	6 ft 2 in (1.88 m)	Sr	Lincoln-Way North	Frankford, IL

Head coach

- Kia Damon (Millersville)

Assistant coach(es)

- Tom Lochner (Temple)
- Natalie Jarrett (UCLA)
- Jennifer Montoya (Penn State)

Legend

- (C) Team captain
- (S) Suspended
- (I) Ineligible
- (W) Walk-on
- Injured
- Current redshirt

Roster
Last update: January 9, 2018

== Schedule ==
Date time, TV	Rank^{#}	Opponent^{#}	Result	Record	Site (attendance) city, state
Non-conference regular season
11/10/2017*; 7:00 pm		La Salle	L 47–74	0–1	Kirby Sports Center (644); Easton, PA
11/12/2017*; 1:00 pm		at Saint Peter's	L 61–64	0–2	Yanitelli Center (245); Jersey City, NJ
11/18/2017*; 5:00 pm		at Penn	L 42–55	0–3	Palestra (705); Philadelphia, PA
11/21/2017*; 7:00 pm		Rider	W 60–45	1–3	Kirby Sports Center (266); Easton, PA
11/25/2017*; 2:00 pm		LIU Brooklyn	W 69–53	2–3	Kirby Sports Center (266); Easton, PA
11/28/2017*; 7:00 pm		at Cornell	W 59–58	3–3	Newman Arena (117); Ithaca, NY
12/01/2017*; 7:00 pm		at Drexel	L 37–52	3–4	Daskalakis Athletic Center (572); Philadelphia, PA
12/06/2017*; 6:00 pm, WBPH		Princeton	L 45–53	3–5	Kirby Sports Center (554); Easton, PA
12/09/2017*; 1:00 pm		at Robert Morris	L 42–63	3–6	North Athletic Complex (391); Moon Township, PA
12/20/2017*; 12:00 pm		Wagner	W 70–52	4–6	Kirby Sports Center (183); Easton, PA
Patriot League regular season
12/29/2017; 4:00 pm		at Lehigh	L 45–70	4–7 (0–1)	Stabler Arena (725); Bethlehem, PA
01/02/2018; 7:00 pm		at Holy Cross	W 69–65	5–7 (1–1)	Hart Center (704); Worcester, MA
01/05/2018; 7:00 pm, WBPH		Colgate	W 63–48	6–7 (2–1)	Kirby Sports Center (366); Easton, PA
01/08/2018; 11:00 am		at Bucknell	L 53–83	6–8 (2–2)	Sojka Pavilion (1,638); Lewisburg, PA
01/11/2018; 7:00 pm, WPCH		Army	L 60–65	6–9 (2–3)	Kirby Sports Center (486); Easton, PA
01/14/2018; 2:00 pm, WPCH		Loyola (MD)	W 65–54	7–9 (3–3)	Kirby Sports Center (446); Easton, PA
01/17/2018; 7:00 pm		at Navy	L 59–65	7–10 (3–4)	Alumni Hall (1,133); Annapolis, MD
01/20/2018; 2:00 pm, WPCH		American	L 67–74	7–11 (3–5)	Kirby Sports Center (577); Easton, PA
01/24/2018; 7:00 pm		at Boston University	W 47–45	8–11 (4–5)	Case Gym (187); Boston, MA
01/27/2018; 2:00 pm, WBPH		Holy Cross	L 56–69	8–12 (4–6)	Kirby Sports Center (1,012); Easton, PA
02/03/2018; 2:00 pm, WBPH		Bucknell	L 57–80	8–13 (4–7)	Kirby Sports Center (877); Easton, PA
02/07/2018; 7:00 pm		at Army	L 39–48	8–14 (4–8)	Christl Arena (432); West Point, NY
02/10/2018; 2:00 pm		at Loyola (MD)	W 73–64	9–14 (5–8)	Reitz Arena (1,450); Baltimore, MD
02/14/2018; 7:00 pm, WPCH		Navy	L 43–59	9–15 (5–9)	Kirby Sports Center (303); Easton, PA
02/17/2018; 1:00 pm		at American	L 66–74	9–16 (5–10)	Bender Arena (497); Washington, D.C.
02/21/2018; 7:00 pm, WPCH		Boston University	W 44–41	10–16 (6–10)	Kirby Sports Center (347); Easton, PA
02/24/2018; 2:00 pm, WBPH		Lehigh	L 62–72	10–17 (6–11)	Kirby Sports Center (866); Easton, PA
02/28/2018; 7:00 pm		at Colgate	L 55–60	10–18 (6–12)	Cotterell Court (288); Hamilton, NY
Patriot League Women's Tournament
03/03/2018; 2:00 pm	(8)	(9) Boston University; First Round	W 66–61	11–18	Kirby Sports Center (435); Easton, PA
03/05/2018; 7:00 pm	(8)	at (1) American; Quarterfinals	L 35–55	11–19	Bender Arena (501); Washington, D.C.
*Non-conference game. ^{#}Rankings from AP poll. (#) Tournament seedings in parentheses. All times are in Eastern Time.

== See also ==
- 2017–18 Lafayette Leopards men's basketball team
