= 2017–18 Loyola Greyhounds women's basketball team =

Intercollegiate basketball season

2017–18 Loyola Greyhounds women's basketball
- Conference: Patriot League
- Record: 9–21 (7–11 Patriot)
- Head coach: Joe Logan (12th season)
- Assistant coaches: Shelley Sheetz; Sarah Jones; Jenna Loschiavo
- Home arena: Reitz Arena

2017–18 Patriot League women's basketball standings
	Conf.				Overall
Team	W		L	PCT	W		L	PCT
American †	16	–	2	.889	26	–	7	.788
Bucknell	15	–	3	.833	22	–	10	.688
Navy	13	–	5	.722	25	–	8	.758
Army	9	–	9	.500	17	–	14	.548
Lehigh	9	–	9	.500	15	–	15	.500
Holy Cross	7	–	11	.389	12	–	18	.400
Loyola (MD)	7	–	11	.389	9	–	21	.300
Lafayette	6	–	12	.333	11	–	19	.367
Boston University	5	–	13	.278	10	–	19	.345
Colgate	3	–	15	.167	7	–	23	.233
† 2018 Patriot League tournament winner As of 16 March 2018; Rankings from AP poll

The 2017–18 Loyola Greyhounds women's basketball team represented Loyola University Maryland during the 2017–18 NCAA Division I women's basketball season. The Greyhounds, led by twelfth year head coach Joe Logan, played their home games at Reitz Arena and were members of the Patriot League. They finished the season 9–21, 7–11 in Patriot League play to finish in a tie for sixth place. They lost in the quarterfinals of the Patriot League women's tournament to Navy.

== Previous season ==
They finished the season 11–20, 6–12 in Patriot League play to finish in a tie for seventh place. They advanced to the quarterfinals of the Patriot League women's tournament where they lost to Bucknell.

== Roster ==
2017–18 Loyola Greyhounds women's basketball team
Players
Coaches

Pos.	#	Name	Height	Year	Previous school	Hometown
G	1	Molly Taylor	5 ft 9 in (1.75 m)	So	Mercersburg Academy	Cranleigh, England
G	3	Abby Omdahl	5 ft 11 in (1.8 m)	Jr	Saucon Valley	Bethlehem, PA
F	4	Claire Jakaitis	6 ft 2 in (1.88 m)	So	St. Charles North	South Elgin, IL
G	10	Stephanie Karcz	5 ft 11 in (1.8 m)	So	Middletown South	Red Bank, NJ
G	11	Bri Betz-White	5 ft 3 in (1.6 m)	Sr	Trinity	Mechanicsburg, PA
G	12	CaLee Gelbaugh	5 ft 8 in (1.73 m)	Sr	Central Dauphin East	Harrisburg, PA
F	13	Izzy Therien	6 ft 0 in (1.83 m)	Fr	Cherokee	Marlton, NJ
G	14	Madelene McDonald	5 ft 10 in (1.78 m)	Sr	Southern Lehigh	Coopersburg, PA
F	15	Ashley Hunter	6 ft 0 in (1.83 m)	Jr	The John Carroll School	Abingdon, MD
G	20	Alexis Gray	5 ft 6 in (1.68 m)	So	Georgetown Visitation	Clarksburg, MD
G	22	Alex Barazotti	5 ft 6 in (1.68 m)	Jr	Red Bank Catholic	Howell, NJ
G/F	24	Maria Kilcullen	5 ft 9 in (1.75 m)	Jr	The Episcopal Academy	Berwyn, PA
F	31	Tori Schultz	5 ft 9 in (1.75 m)	Jr	Lampeter-Strasburg	Lancaster, PA
G	32	Hannah Niles	5 ft 9 in (1.75 m)	So	Walt Whitman	Glen Echo, MD
F	44	Delaney Connolly	6 ft 0 in (1.83 m)	Fr	Oakton	Vienna, VA
F	55	Courtney Vannoy	6 ft 1 in (1.85 m)	Jr	Blackhawk	Beaver Falls, PA

Head coach

- Joe Logan (Loyola (MD))

Assistant coach(es)

- Shelley Sheetz (Colorado)
- Sarah Jones (Villanova)
- Jenna Loschiavo (Saint Joseph's)

Legend

- (C) Team captain
- (S) Suspended
- (I) Ineligible
- (W) Walk-on
- Injured
- Current redshirt

Roster
Last update: January 9, 2018

== Schedule ==
Date time, TV	Rank^{#}	Opponent^{#}	Result	Record	Site (attendance) city, state
Non-conference regular season
11/10/2017*; 12:00 pm		Cornell	W 78–63	1–0	Reitz Arena (374); Baltimore, MD
11/14/2017*; 7:00 pm		George Mason	L 72–80	1–1	Reitz Arena (212); Baltimore, MD
11/16/2017*; 7:00 pm		Georgetown	L 54–72	1–2	Reitz Arena (273); Baltimore, MD
11/19/2017*; 4:00 pm		at No. 16 Marquette	L 63–83	1–3	Al McGuire Center (806); Milwaukee, WI
11/21/2017*; 11:00 am		at Norfolk State	W 61–58	2–3	Joseph G. Echols Memorial Hall (1,512); Norfolk, VA
11/25/2017*; 3:00 pm		at William & Mary	L 49–70	2–4	Kaplan Arena (345); Williamsburg, VA
12/02/2017*; 1:00 pm		at Mount St. Mary's	L 63–71	2–5	Knott Arena (922); Emmitsburg, MD
12/06/2017*; 7:00 pm		at St. Francis Brooklyn	L 47–64	2–6	Generoso Pope Athletic Complex (218); Brooklyn, NY
12/09/2017*; 1:00 pm		Towson	L 67–76	2–7	Reitz Arena (787); Baltimore, MD
12/11/2017*; 6:00 pm, BTN		at No. 15 Maryland	L 45–114	2–8	Xfinity Center (3,486); College Park, MD
12/22/2017*; 1:00 pm		at Delaware	L 38–71	2–9	Bob Carpenter Center (1,414); Newark, DE
Patriot League regular season
12/29/2017; 7:00 pm		at Navy	L 44–73	2–10 (0–1)	Alumni Hall (852); Annapolis, MD
01/02/2018; 7:00 pm		Army	L 62–69	2–11 (0–2)	Reitz Arena (216); Baltimore, MD
01/05/2018; 7:00 pm		at Boston University	L 56–75	2–12 (0–3)	Case Gym (148); Boston, MA
01/08/2018; 7:00 pm		Holy Cross	W 77–60	3–12 (1–3)	Reitz Arena (105); Baltimore, MD
01/11/2018; 11:30 am		American	L 58–71	3–13 (1–4)	Reitz Arena (1,012); Baltimore, MD
01/14/2018; 2:00 pm		at Lafayette	L 54–65	3–14 (1–5)	Kirby Sports Center (446); Easton, PA
01/16/2018; 6:00 pm		at Bucknell	W 68–65	4–14 (2–5)	Sojka Pavilion (614); Lewisburg, PA
01/21/2018; 12:00 pm		Colgate	W 70–55	5–14 (3–5)	Reitz Arena (193); Baltimore, MD
01/24/2018; 7:00 pm		Lehigh	W 67–64	6–14 (4–5)	Reitz Arena (297); Baltimore, MD
01/27/2018; 3:00 pm		at Army	L 47–62	6–15 (4–6)	Christl Arena (949); West Point, NY
02/03/2018; 1:00 pm		at Holy Cross	W 65–58	7–15 (5–6)	Hart Center (1,143); Worcester, MA
02/07/2018; 7:00 pm		at American	L 56–69	7–16 (5–7)	Bender Arena (322); Washington, D.C.
02/10/2018; 2:00 pm		Lafayette	L 64–73	7–17 (5–8)	Reitz Arena (1,450); Baltimore, MD
02/14/2018; 7:00 pm		Bucknell	L 69–74	7–18 (5–9)	Reitz Arena (202); Baltimore, MD
02/17/2018; 2:00 pm		at Colgate	L 60–71	7–19 (5–10)	Cotterell Court (326); Hamilton, NY
02/21/2018; 6:00 pm		at Lehigh	L 55–64	7–20 (5–11)	Stabler Arena (568); Bethlehem, PA
02/24/2018; 3:00 pm		Navy	W 58–40	8–20 (6–11)	Reitz Arena (206); Baltimore, MD
02/28/2018; 7:00 pm		Boston University	W 65–52	9–20 (7–11)	Reitz Arena (305); Baltimore, MD
Patriot League Women's Tournament
03/05/2018; 7:00 pm	(6)	at (3) Navy; Quarterfinals	L 55–63	9–21	Alumni Hall (487); Annapolis, MD
*Non-conference game. ^{#}Rankings from AP Poll. (#) Tournament seedings in parentheses. All times are in Eastern Time.

== See also ==
- 2017–18 Loyola Greyhounds men's basketball team
