= 2017–18 Colgate Raiders women's basketball team =

Intercollegiate basketball season

2017–18 Colgate Raiders women's basketball
- Conference: Patriot League
- Record: 7–23 (3–15 Patriot)
- Head coach: Bill Cleary (2nd season)
- Assistant coaches: Mahogany Green; Lauren Ellis; Candice Green
- Home arena: Cotterell Court

2017–18 Patriot League women's basketball standings
	Conf.				Overall
Team	W		L	PCT	W		L	PCT
American †	16	–	2	.889	26	–	7	.788
Bucknell	15	–	3	.833	22	–	10	.688
Navy	13	–	5	.722	25	–	8	.758
Army	9	–	9	.500	17	–	14	.548
Lehigh	9	–	9	.500	15	–	15	.500
Holy Cross	7	–	11	.389	12	–	18	.400
Loyola (MD)	7	–	11	.389	9	–	21	.300
Lafayette	6	–	12	.333	11	–	19	.367
Boston University	5	–	13	.278	10	–	19	.345
Colgate	3	–	15	.167	7	–	23	.233
† 2018 Patriot League tournament winner As of 16 March 2018; Rankings from AP poll

The 2017–18 Colgate Raiders women's basketball team represented Colgate University during the 2017–18 NCAA Division I women's basketball season. The Raiders, led by second year head coach Bill Cleary, played their home games at Cotterell Court and were members of the Patriot League. They finished the season 7–23, 3–15 in Patriot League play to finish in last place. They lost in the first round of the Patriot League women's tournament to Holy Cross.

== Previous season ==
They finished the season 10–20, 7–11 in Patriot League play to finish in a tie for eighth place. They lost in the quarterfinals of the Patriot League women's tournament to Army.

== Roster ==
2017–18 Colgate Raiders women's basketball team
Players
Coaches

Pos.	#	Name	Height	Year	Previous school	Hometown
F	0	Mylah Chandler	5 ft 10 in (1.78 m)	Jr	Albany	Albany, NY
G	2	Tegan Graham (C)	5 ft 11 in (1.8 m)	So	Wellington Girls' College	Wellington, New Zealand
G	3	Nia Ahart	5 ft 7 in (1.7 m)	Fr	University Liggett School	Detroit, MI
G	4	Mackenzie Carroll	5 ft 9 in (1.75 m)	Jr	Central Bucks HS West	New Britain, PA
F	5	Chelsey Koren	5 ft 10 in (1.78 m)	Jr	Blairsville	Blairsville, PA
G	11	Kateri Stone	6 ft 1 in (1.85 m)	Sr	Montini Catholic	Naperville, IL
G	13	Keelah Dixon	5 ft 5 in (1.65 m)	Fr	Braintree	Braintree, MA
G	14	Rachel Thompson	5 ft 10 in (1.78 m)	So	Mary Institute and St. Louis Country Day	St. Louis, MO
G	15	Haley Greer	5 ft 10 in (1.78 m)	So	New Trier	Winnetka, IL
F	22	Abby Schubiger	6 ft 1 in (1.85 m)	So	Morristown	Morristown, NJ
F	23	Tori Pozsonyi	6 ft 1 in (1.85 m)	Sr	Roselle Catholic	Roselle Park, NJ
F	33	Julia Barcello	6 ft 0 in (1.83 m)	Sr	Seton Catholic Prep	Chandler, AZ
F	40	Summer King (C)	6 ft 1 in (1.85 m)	Jr	Walpole	Walpole, MA

Head coach

- Bill Cleary (Villanova)

Assistant coach(es)

- Mahogany Green (Cleveland State)
- Lauren Ellis (Bloomsburg)
- Candice Green (Colgate)

Legend

- (C) Team captain
- (S) Suspended
- (I) Ineligible
- (W) Walk-on
- Injured
- Current redshirt

Roster
Last update: January 6, 2018

== Schedule ==
Date time, TV	Rank^{#}	Opponent^{#}	Result	Record	Site (attendance) city, state
Non-conference regular season
11/10/2017*; 7:00 pm, ESPN3		at Canisius	W 70–63	1–0	Koessler Athletic Center (1,007); Buffalo, NY
11/13/2017*; 7:00 pm		at Yale	L 56–82	1–1	John J. Lee Amphitheater (846); New Haven, CT
11/16/2017*; 7:00 pm		at Cornell	W 74–70	2–1	Newman Arena (212); Ithaca, NY
11/19/2017*; 5:00 pm		at Arizona State	L 54–65	2–2	Wells Fargo Arena (5,394); Tempe, AZ
11/22/2017*; 12:00 pm		at Fairleigh Dickinson	L 51–61	2–3	Rothman Center (402); Hackensack, NJ
11/26/2017*; 2:00 pm		at Towson	W 65–61	3–3	SECU Arena (151); Towson, MD
11/29/2017*; 7:00 pm		Siena	L 70–73 ^{OT}	3–4	Cotterell Court (563); Hamilton, NY
12/02/2017*; 2:00 pm		UMass Lowell	W 84–64	4–4	Cotterell Court (213); Hamilton, NY
12/06/2017*; 7:00 pm		at Syracuse	L 39–79	4–5	Carrier Dome (1,131); Syracuse, NY
12/10/2017*; 12:00 pm		Brown	L 73–83	4–6	Cotterell Court (487); Hamilton, NY
12/22/2017*; 12:00 pm		Niagara	L 44–81	4–7	Cotterell Court (219); Hamilton, NY
Patriot League regular season
12/29/2017; 7:00 pm		Holy Cross	L 64–71	4–8 (0–1)	Cotterell Court (302); Hamilton, NY
01/02/2018; 2:00 pm		American	L 55–77	4–9 (0–2)	Cotterell Court (211); Hamilton, NY
01/05/2018; 7:00 pm		at Lafayette	L 48–63	4–10 (0–3)	Kirby Sports Center (366); Easton, PA
01/08/2018; 7:00 pm		at Navy	L 45–70	4–11 (0–4)	Alumni Hall (1,131); Annapolis, MD
01/11/2018; 12:00 pm		Boston University	L 49–62	4–12 (0–5)	Cotterell Court (1,342); Hamilton, NY
01/14/2018; 2:00 pm		at Bucknell	L 57–77	4–13 (0–6)	Sojka Pavilion (790); Lewisburg, PA
01/17/2018; 7:00 pm		Lehigh	L 51–59	4–14 (0–7)	Cottrell Court (264); Hamilton, NY
01/21/2018; 12:00 pm		at Loyola (MD)	L 55–70	4–15 (0–8)	Reitz Arena (193); Baltimore, MD
01/24/2018; 7:00 pm		Army	L 54–62	4–16 (0–9)	Cottrell Court (133); Hamilton, NY
01/27/2018; 2:00 pm		at American	L 55–77	4–17 (0–10)	Bender Arena (405); Washington, D.C.
02/03/2018; 2:00 pm		Navy	L 42–69	4–18 (0–11)	Cotterell Court (404); Hamilton, NY
02/07/2018; 7:00 pm		at Boston University	L 64–66 ^{OT}	4–19 (0–12)	Case Gym (393); Boston, MA
02/10/2018; 2:00 pm		Bucknell	L 42–63	4–20 (0–13)	Cotterell Court (439); Hamilton, NY
02/14/2018; 6:00 pm		at Lehigh	W 54–48	5–20 (1–13)	Stabler Arena (571); Bethlehem, PA
02/17/2018; 2:00 pm		Loyola (MD)	W 71–60	6–20 (2–13)	Cottrell Court (326); Hamilton, NY
02/21/2018; 11:00 am		at Army	L 54–62	6–21 (2–14)	Christl Arena (634); West Point, NY
02/24/2018; 1:00 pm		at Holy Cross	L 52–61	6–22 (2–15)	Hart Center (1,080); Worcester, MA
02/28/2018; 7:00 pm		Lafayette	W 60–55	7–22 (3–15)	Cotterell Court (288); Hamilton, NY
Patriot League Women's Tournament
03/03/2018; 1:00 pm	(10)	at (7) Holy Cross; First Round	L 47–66	7–23	Hart Center (537); Worcester, MA
*Non-conference game. ^{#}Rankings from AP Poll. (#) Tournament seedings in parentheses. All times are in Eastern Time.

== See also ==
- 2017–18 Colgate Raiders men's basketball team
