= Emellia Prokopik =

Ukrainian Catholic nun

Mother General Emellia Prokopik O.S.B.M.
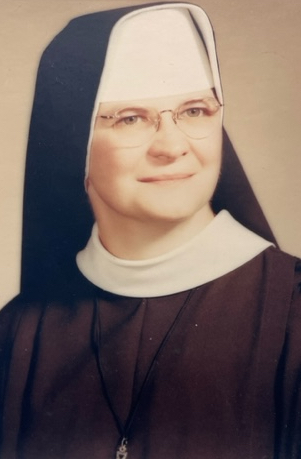

Personal life
- Born: May 11, 1920 Arnold, Pennsylvania, United States
- Died: December 17, 2015 (aged 95) Abington, Pennsylvania, United States

Religious life
- Religion: Ukrainian Catholic

Emellia Prokopik, OSBM (Ukrainian: Емелія Прокопик, romanized: Emeliia Prokopyk; born Mildred E. Prokopik; May 11, 1920 – December 17, 2015) was a Ukrainian-American Catholic nun who served for 12 years as superior general of the Sisters of Saint Basil the Great.

== Youth, education, and vows ==
She was born Mildred E. Prokopik to Annie Anna Kilar from Galicia, an area comprising parts of modern-day Poland and Ukraine, and Vasyl (also Wasyl) Prokopik from Ukraine. There were eight children, and they all went to St. Vladimir's Church. She was fluent in Ukrainian as well as English, Latin, and German, and she may have spoken Polish. She began high school at St. Basil Academy in Abington, Pennsylvania.

Prokopik expressed her Eastern Christian spirituality by entering the Order of Saint Basil the Great before finishing high school, at age 16, on July 23, 1936. Her first profession was on August 27, 1939, and she made her final vows before the Most Reverend Constantine Bohachevsky, the first Ukrainian Metropolitan (bishop) in the US, on August 27, 1945. Then she completed high school, where her teachers noted her talent and encouraged her to go on for higher education. She majored in Latin at Catholic University of America in Washington, DC for her BA, and Villanova University near Philadelphia, Pennsylvania for her MA. She began but did not complete doctoral studies in school administration at Fordham University.

Sisters in her congregation study the writings of Basil the Great and other Eastern Fathers, and have a devotion to Mary. The church belongs to the Byzantine Rite and is in full communion with Roman Catholicism. Pope John Paul II wrote in paragraph 54 of Ut unum sint that the church "must breathe with her two lungs," meaning the union of Latin and Orthodox traditions.

== Work as an educator ==
In Chicago she was principal of St. Nicholas Ukrainian Catholic School's St. Basil Academy. In New York she was principal of St. George Elementary School and St. George Academy. Then in Hamtramck, Michigan she served in that role at Immaculate Conception Ukrainian Catholic High School. Finally, back in Jenkintown, Pennsylvania, she was Academic Dean at Manor College, founded by the Byzantine Ukrainian Sisters of Saint Basil the Great. Throughout her teaching career she found opportunities to teach classics and German.

== Serving the congregation ==
She took on leadership roles for her order first as provincial councilor, then Mother General, and General Councilor. When the Order was based in Rome in the 1950s, she served there as Province Historian. She remained good friends with Metropolitan (bishop) Bohachevsky until his death in 1961, and he once confided to her that "most at home" with their congregation in Pennsylvania. She also led the province of Jesus, Lover of Humanity in Pennsylvania, what the first Ukrainian bishop in the US called "cradle of the Ukrainian Catholic Church in the United States."

The sisters elected her superior general in 1971, while she was still in Rome, and she led the Basilian provinces through the many changes wrought by Vatican II. After she was elected, Pope Paul VI offered her a special papal audience on July 21, 1971. The pope encouraged her (in the words of her uncle who was present) to "have faith and courage during her tenure of office... and to diligently love, pray and work for the improvement of conditions in Ukraine for his persecuted Ukrainian people." She continued as superior general for 12 years, until 1983, visited Basilian Sisters worldwide. She knew Eugenio Pacelli in Rome even before he became Pope Pius XII.

== In Ukraine and Ukrainian influence ==
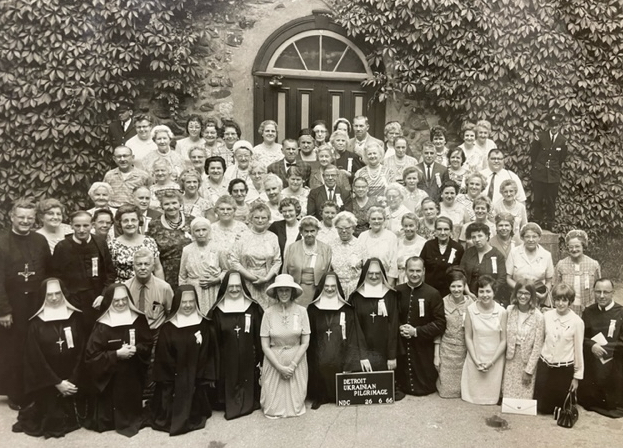
With a Detroit Ukrainian Pilgrimage, 1966. Photographs are provided by permission of the archives, Sisters of the Order of Saint Basil the Great, Fox Chase, Pennsylvania.

When visiting Ukraine was prohibited for US citizens, she kept up contact with those Basilian Sisters while she served as General Councilor in Rome from 1983 to 1989. After the fall of the Iron Curtain in 1989, she became a Special Delegate assigned to the congregation's Basilian Province in Ukraine, and while based there she also visited sisters in Poland, Czechoslovakia, and Yugoslavia. She returned to the United States in 1995. Archbishop Stephen Sulyk asked her to promote the beatification of Ukrainian Metropolitan Andrew Sheptytsky of the Ukrainian Greek Catholic Church. The Holy See approved his beatification shortly before her 2015 death.

== Publication ==
- Emellia Prokopik, Keepers of the Flame: 90 Year Province History, 1911-2001, (Fox Chase, Pennsylvania:Sisters of the Order of Saint Basil the Great, 2005), the history of the Basilian Sisters in America.

== Legacy and death ==
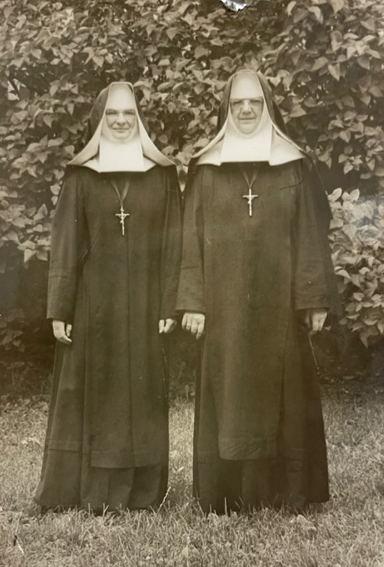
Sr. Emellia (l) and Sr. Eveline. Graciously provided provided by permission of the archives, Sisters of the Order of Saint Basil the Great, Fox Chase, Pennsylvania.

On Thursday, May 13, 1982, Charles F. Dougherty, the Republican member of Congress from Pennsylvania, read her name into the Congressional Record when honoring the congregation on its 50th jubilee. Her closest friend in the congregation was Sister Bohdonna Stephanie Podney, who was named in her obituary for their years of friendship. In 2015, the Major Archbishop Sviatoslav Shevchuk, leader of the Eastern Catholic Church, and Metropolitan Archbishop Stefan Soroka visited her personally during her last illness.
