= 2017–18 Navy Midshipmen women's basketball team =

Intercollegiate basketball season

2017–18 Navy Midshipmen women's basketball

Navy Classic Champions

WNIT, First Round
- Conference: Patriot League
- Record: 25–8 (13–5 Patriot)
- Head coach: Stefanie Pemper (10th season)
- Assistant coaches: Jimmy Colloton; Ryenn Micaletti; Rebecca Tillett; Katie Rokus
- Home arena: Alumni Hall

2017–18 Patriot League women's basketball standings
	Conf.				Overall
Team	W		L	PCT	W		L	PCT
American †	16	–	2	.889	26	–	7	.788
Bucknell	15	–	3	.833	22	–	10	.688
Navy	13	–	5	.722	25	–	8	.758
Army	9	–	9	.500	17	–	14	.548
Lehigh	9	–	9	.500	15	–	15	.500
Holy Cross	7	–	11	.389	12	–	18	.400
Loyola (MD)	7	–	11	.389	9	–	21	.300
Lafayette	6	–	12	.333	11	–	19	.367
Boston University	5	–	13	.278	10	–	19	.345
Colgate	3	–	15	.167	7	–	23	.233
† 2018 Patriot League tournament winner As of 16 March 2018; Rankings from AP poll

The 2017–18 Navy Midshipmen women's basketball team represented the United States Naval Academy during the 2017–18 NCAA Division I women's basketball season. The Midshipmen, led by tenth year head coach Stefanie Pemper, played their home games at Alumni Hall and are members of the Patriot League. They finished the season 25–8, 13–5 in Patriot League play to finish in third place. They advanced to the championship game of the Patriot League women's tournament, where they lost to American. They received an at-large bid to the Women's National Invitation Tournament, where they lost to Virginia Tech in the first round.

== Previous season ==
They advanced to the championship of the Patriot League women's tournament where they lost to Bucknell. They received an automatic bid to the Women's National Invitation Tournament they defeated George Washington in the first round before losing to Virginia Tech in the second round.

== Roster ==
2017–18 Navy Midshipmen women's basketball team
Players
Coaches

Pos.	#	Name	Height	Year	Previous school	Hometown
G	0	Morgan Taylor	5 ft 7 in (1.7 m)	So	Greenbrier	Evans, GA
G	1	Taylor Durham	5 ft 4 in (1.63 m)	Sr	Mount Vernon	Fort Belvoir, VA
G	3	Cayla Hannibal	5 ft 4 in (1.63 m)	Fr	Salem	Virginia Beach, VA
C	4	Victoria Coleman	6 ft 3 in (1.91 m)	Fr	Great Bridge	Chesapeake, VA
F	10	Laurel Jaunich	6 ft 0 in (1.83 m)	So	Champlain Valley Union	Charlotte, VT
F	11	Kaila Clark	5 ft 11 in (1.8 m)	So	Archbishop Spalding	Hughesville, MD
G	12	Sierra Swanda	5 ft 10 in (1.78 m)	Fr	Potter's House Christian Academy	Jacksonville, FL
G	13	Hannah Fenske	5 ft 8 in (1.73 m)	Sr	Volcano Vista	Albuquerque, NM
G	15	Bianca Roach	5 ft 7 in (1.7 m)	Jr	Cape Henry Collegiate	Virginia Beach, VA
F	20	Maggie Phillips	6 ft 0 in (1.83 m)	Sr	Loudoun County	Leesburg, VA
G	21	Jasmine Bishop	5 ft 9 in (1.75 m)	Fr	Twinsburg	Twinsburg, OH
G	23	Molly Sanders	5 ft 7 in (1.7 m)	Jr	Ames	Ames, IA
F	30	Montana Braxton	5 ft 10 in (1.78 m)	So	Cape Elizabeth	Cape Elizabeth, ME
G	33	Sophie Gatzounas	5 ft 9 in (1.75 m)	Fr	South Hadley	South Hadley, MA
C	34	Grace Sheehan	6 ft 2 in (1.88 m)	Fr	Mount Saint Dominic Academy	Fairfield, NJ
G	55	Mary Kate Ulasewicz	5 ft 5 in (1.65 m)	So	Mount Saint Joseph	Doylestown, PA

Head coach

- Stefanie Pemper (Idaho State)

Assistant coach(es)

- Jimmy Colloton (Wittenberg)
- Ryenn Micaletti (Seton Hill)
- Katie Rokus (USC Aiken)
- Rebecca Tillett (William & Mary)

Legend

- (C) Team captain
- (S) Suspended
- (I) Ineligible
- (W) Walk-on
- Injured
- Current redshirt

Roster
Last update: January 9, 2018

== Schedule ==
Date time, TV	Rank^{#}	Opponent^{#}	Result	Record	Site (attendance) city, state
Non-conference regular season
11/10/2017*; 7:00 pm		at Marist	W 77–70	1–0	McCann Field House (1,608); Poughkeepsie, NY
11/12/2017*; 4:00 pm		Rider	W 63–44	2–0	Alumni Hall (503); Annapolis, MD
11/17/2017*; 7:00 pm		Norfolk State	W 70–51	3–0	Alumni Hall (192); Annapolis, MD
11/22/2017*; 5:00 pm		Air Force	W 71–64	4–0	Alumni Hall (1,242); Annapolis, MD
11/25/2017*; 5:00 pm		North Dakota State; Navy Classic semifinals	W 67–54	5–0	Alumni Hall (378); Annapolis, MD
11/26/2017*; 3:15 pm		St. Bonaventure; Navy Classic championship	W 86–48	6–0	Alumni Hall (215); Annapolis, MD
11/30/2017*; 7:00 pm		Monmouth	W 73–49	7–0	Alumni Hall (211); Annapolis, MD
12/03/2017*; 3:15 pm		Emory & Henry	W 88–57	8–0	Alumni Hall (848); Annapolis, MD
12/06/2017*; 7:00 pm		at Richmond	W 76–56	9–0	Robins Center (407); Richmond, VA
12/10/2017*; 3:00 pm		at New Mexico	L 87–94 ^{OT}	9–1	Dreamstyle Arena (6,763); Albuquerque, NM
12/20/2017*; 7:00 pm		at LIU Brooklyn	W 79–47	10–1	Steinberg Wellness Center (203); Brooklyn, NY
Patriot League regular season
12/29/2017; 7:00 pm		Loyola (MD)	W 73–44	11–1 (1–0)	Alumni Hall (852); Annapolis, MD
01/02/2018; 6:00 pm		at Lehigh	L 63–66	11–2 (1–1)	Stabler Arena (433); Bethlehem, PA
01/05/2018; 7:00 pm		at American	L 41–46	11–3 (1–2)	Bender Arena (199); Washington, D.C.
01/08/2018; 7:00 pm		Colgate	W 70–45	12–3 (2–2)	Alumni Hall (1,131); Annapolis, MD
01/11/2018; 7:00 pm		at Holy Cross	W 65–58	13–3 (3–2)	Hart Center (886); Worcester, MA
01/14/2018; 12:00 pm, CBSSN		Army	W 70–45	14–3 (4–2)	Alumni Hall (5,710); Annapolis, MD
01/17/2018; 7:00 pm		Lafayette	W 65–59	15–3 (5–2)	Alumni Hall (1,133); Annapolis, MD
01/20/2018; 2:00 pm		at Boston University	W 64–59	16–3 (6–2)	Case Gym (484); Boston, MA
01/24/2018; 6:00 pm		at Bucknell	L 39–47	16–4 (6–3)	Sojka Pavilion (639); Lewisburg, PA
01/27/2018; 7:00 pm		Lehigh	W 53–50	17–4 (7–3)	Alumni Hall (672); Annapolis, MD
02/03/2018; 2:00 pm		at Colgate	W 69–42	18–4 (8–3)	Cotterell Court (404); Hamilton, NY
02/07/2018; 7:00 pm		Holy Cross	W 62–54	19–4 (9–3)	Alumni Hall (1,368); Annapolis, MD
02/10/2018; 11:00 am, CBSSN		at Army	W 55–46	20–4 (10–3)	Christl Arena (5,181); West Point, NY
02/14/2018; 7:00 pm		at Lafayette	W 59–43	21–4 (11–3)	Kirby Sports Center (303); Easton, PA
02/17/2018; 5:30 pm		Boston University	W 59–48	22–4 (12–3)	Alumni Hall (881); Annapolis, MD
02/21/2018; 7:00 pm		Bucknell	L 40–49	22–5 (12–4)	Alumni Hall (1,053); Annapolis, MD
02/24/2017; 3:00 pm		at Loyola (MD)	W 58–40	23–5 (13–4)	Reitz Arena (206); Baltimore, MD
02/28/2018; 7:00 pm		American	L 49–76	23–6 (13–5)	Alumni Hall (608); Annapolis, MD
Patriot League Women's Tournament
03/05/2018; 7:00 pm	(3)	(6) Loyola (MD); Quarterfinals	W 68–62	24–6	Alumni Hall (487); Annapolis, MD
03/08/2018; 6:00 pm	(3)	at (2) Bucknell; Semifinals	W 68–62	25–6	Sojka Pavilion (619); Lewisburg, PA
03/11/2018; 11:00 am, CBSSN	(3)	at (1) American; Championship Game	L 49–58	25–7	Bender Arena (1,001); Washington, D.C.
WNIT
03/16/2018*; 7:00 pm		at Virginia Tech; First Round	L 55–56	25–8	Cassell Coliseum (828); Blacksburg, VA
*Non-conference game. ^{#}Rankings from AP Poll. (#) Tournament seedings in parentheses. All times are in Eastern Time.

== Rankings ==
2017–18 NCAA Division I women's basketball rankings

+ Regular season polls	Poll	Pre- Season	Week 2	Week 3	Week 4	Week 5	Week 6	Week 7	Week 8	Week 9	Week 10	Week 11	Week 12	Week 13	Week 14	Week 15	Week 16	Week 17	Week 18	Week 19	Final
AP									RV											N/A	
Coaches		N/A																			

Legend
	Increase in ranking
	Decrease in ranking
	Not ranked previous week
(RV)	Received Votes

== See also ==
- 2017–18 Navy Midshipmen men's basketball team
