= 2017–18 Lehigh Mountain Hawks women's basketball team =

Intercollegiate basketball season

2017–18 Lehigh Mountain Hawks women's basketball
- Conference: Patriot League
- Record: 15–15 (9–9 Patriot)
- Head coach: Sue Troyan (23rd season)
- Assistant coaches: Glenn Rigney; Caitlin Gillard; Ariel Braker
- Home arena: Stabler Arena

2017–18 Patriot League women's basketball standings
	Conf.				Overall
Team	W		L	PCT	W		L	PCT
American †	16	–	2	.889	26	–	7	.788
Bucknell	15	–	3	.833	22	–	10	.688
Navy	13	–	5	.722	25	–	8	.758
Army	9	–	9	.500	17	–	14	.548
Lehigh	9	–	9	.500	15	–	15	.500
Holy Cross	7	–	11	.389	12	–	18	.400
Loyola (MD)	7	–	11	.389	9	–	21	.300
Lafayette	6	–	12	.333	11	–	19	.367
Boston University	5	–	13	.278	10	–	19	.345
Colgate	3	–	15	.167	7	–	23	.233
† 2018 Patriot League tournament winner As of 16 March 2018; Rankings from AP poll

The 2017–18 Lehigh Mountain Hawks women's basketball team represented Lehigh University during the 2017–18 NCAA Division I women's basketball season. The Mountain Hawks, led by twenty-third year head coach Sue Troyan, played their home games at Stabler Arena and were members of the Patriot League. They finished the season 15–15, 9–9 in Patriot League play to finish in a tie for fourth place. They lost in the quarterfinals of the Patriot League women's tournament to Navy.

== Previous season ==
They finished the season 10–20, 5–13 in Patriot League play to finish in ninth place. They lost in the first round of the Patriot League women's tournament where they lost to Loyola (MD).

== Roster ==
2017–18 Lehigh Mountain Hawks women's basketball team
Players
Coaches

Pos.	#	Name	Height	Year	Previous school	Hometown
G	5	Bernadette Devaney	5 ft 8 in (1.73 m)	Sr	Nova	Cooper City, FL
F	11	Emily Johnson	6 ft 1 in (1.85 m)	Fr	Archbishop Molloy	Franklin Square, NY
F	12	Gena Grundhoffer	6 ft 1 in (1.85 m)	So	Assumption	Wisconsin Rapids, WI
C	13	Megan Eripret	6 ft 3 in (1.91 m)	Jr	Salisbury	Allentown, PA
G	14	Paige Galiani	5 ft 10 in (1.78 m)	So	Langley	Great Falls, VA
G	15	Camrym Buhr	6 ft 1 in (1.85 m)	So	Penn	Misawaka, WI
G	20	Quinci Mann	5 ft 10 in (1.78 m)	Sr	St. Ignatius Prep	Oakland, CA
G	22	Hannah Hedstrom	5 ft 9 in (1.75 m)	So	Minnetonka	Minnetonka, MN
G	23	Ann-Marie Jacobs	5 ft 11 in (1.8 m)	Fr	Bellevue	Clyde Hill, WA
F	24	Bryce Menendez	6 ft 2 in (1.88 m)	Jr	Neuqua Valley	Naperville, IL
G	25	Mary Clougherty	6 ft 0 in (1.83 m)	Fr	Chantilly	Herndon, VA
F	30	Cameryn Benz	6 ft 3 in (1.91 m)	So	Montgomery	Montgomery, NJ
G	33	Hailey Pascoe	5 ft 9 in (1.75 m)	Jr	Clayton Valley	Concord, CA
F	34	Mariah Sexe	6 ft 2 in (1.88 m)	Fr	East Ridge	Woodbury, MN
F	44	Mae Williams	6 ft 0 in (1.83 m)	Sr	Monarch	Lafayette, OH

Head coach

- Sue Troyan (Dickinson)

Assistant coach(es)

- Glenn Rigney (Miami (FL))
- Caitlin Gillard (Colgate)
- Ariel Braker (Notre Dame)

Legend

- (C) Team captain
- (S) Suspended
- (I) Ineligible
- (W) Walk-on
- Injured
- Current redshirt

Roster
Last update: January 9, 2018

== Schedule ==
Date time, TV	Rank^{#}	Opponent^{#}	Result	Record	Site (attendance) city, state
Non-conference regular season
11/11/2017*; 6:00 pm		at Minnesota	L 73–107	0–1	Williams Arena (2,642); Minneapolis, MN
11/14/2017*; 7:00 pm		at Monmouth	W 75–57	1–1	OceanFirst Bank Center (435); West Long Branch, NJ
11/17/2017*; 5:00 pm		vs. Villanova	L 42–62	1–2	PPL Center (6,651); Allentown, PA
11/20/2017*; 7:00 pm		at Cornell	W 62–57	2–2	Newman Arena (124); Ithaca, NY
11/22/2017*; 6:00 pm		Mansfield	W 77–47	3–2	Stabler Arena (486); Bethlehem, PA
11/25/2017*; 2:00 pm		Fairfield; Christmas City Classic semifinals	W 56–53	4–2	Stabler Arena (571); Bethlehem, PA
11/26/2017*; 4:30 pm		La Salle; Christmas City Classic championship game	L 61–69	4–3	Stabler Arena (544); Bethlehem, PA
11/29/2017*; 7:00 pm		Mount St. Mary's	W 75–71	5–3	Stabler Arena (470); Bethlehem, PA
12/03/2017*; 1:00 pm		at Sacred Heart	L 55–65	5–4	William H. Pitt Center (259); Fairfield, CT
12/06/2017*; 11:00 am, SE2		NJIT	W 64–50	6–4	Stabler Arena (4,009); Bethlehem, PA
12/10/2017*; 1:00 pm		at LIU Brooklyn	L 69–72	6–5	Barclays Center (1,242); Brooklyn, NY
Patriot League regular season
12/29/2017; 4:00 pm, SE2		Lafayette	W 70–45	7–5 (1–0)	Stabler Arena (725); Bethlehem, PA
01/02/2018; 6:00 pm, SE2		Navy	W 66–63	8–5 (2–0)	Stabler Arena (433); Bethlehem, PA
01/05/2018; 6:00 pm		at Holy Cross	L 49–54	8–6 (2–1)	Hart Center (710); Worcester, MA
01/08/2018; 6:00 pm, SE2		Boston University	W 74–58	9–6 (3–1)	Stabler Arena (501); Bethlehem, PA
01/11/2018; 6:00 pm, SE2		Bucknell	W 66–62	10–6 (4–1)	Stabler Arena (582); Bethlehem, PA
01/14/2018; 3:00 pm		at American	L 64–82	10–7 (4–2)	Bender Arena (435); Washington, D.C.
01/17/2018; 7:00 pm		at Colgate	W 59–51	11–7 (5–2)	Cotterell Court (264); Hamilton, NY
01/20/2018; 2:00 pm, SE2		Army	W 59–55	12–7 (6–2)	Stabler Arena (634); Bethlehem, PA
01/24/2018; 7:00 pm		at Loyola (MD)	L 64–67	12–8 (6–3)	Reitz Arena (297); Baltimore, MD
01/27/2018; 7:00 pm		at Navy	L 50–53	12–9 (6–4)	Alumni Hall (672); Annapolis, MD
02/03/2018; 2:00 pm		at Boston University	W 65–56	13–9 (7–4)	Case Gym (307); Boston, MA
02/07/2018; 6:00 pm		at Bucknell	L 52–59	13–10 (7–5)	Sojka Pavilion (486); Lewisburg, PA
02/10/2018; 4:00 pm, SE2		American	L 44–60	13–11 (7–6)	Stabler Arena (787); Bethlehem, PA
02/14/2018; 6:00 pm, SE2		Colgate	L 48–54	13–12 (7–7)	Stabler Arena (571); Bethlehem, PA
02/17/2018; 1:00 pm		at Army	L 51–55	13–13 (7–8)	Christl Arena (621); West Point, NY
02/21/2018; 6:00 pm, SE2		Loyola (MD)	W 64–55	14–13 (8–8)	Stabler Arena (568); Bethlehem, PA
02/24/2018; 2:00 pm		at Lafayette	W 72–62	15–13 (9–8)	Kirby Sports Center (866); Easton, PA
02/28/2018; 6:00 pm, SE50		Holy Cross	L 62–65	15–14 (9–9)	Stabler Arena (642); Bethlehem, PA
Patriot League Women's Tournament
03/05/2018; 7:00 pm	(4)	(5) Army; Quarterfinals	L 60–62	15–15	Stabler Arena (483); Bethlehem, PA
*Non-conference game. ^{#}Rankings from AP Poll. (#) Tournament seedings in parentheses. All times are in Eastern Time.

== See also ==
- 2017–18 Lehigh Mountain Hawks men's basketball team
