= 2017–18 American Eagles women's basketball team =

Intercollegiate basketball season

2017–18 American Eagles women's basketball

Patriot League Regular Season and Tournament Champions

NCAA Women's Tournament, first round
- Conference: Patriot League
- Record: 26–7 (16–2 Patriot)
- Head coach: Megan Gebbia (5th season)
- Assistant coaches: Tiffany Coll; Nikki Flores; Emily Stallings
- Home arena: Bender Arena

2017–18 Patriot League women's basketball standings
	Conf.				Overall
Team	W		L	PCT	W		L	PCT
American †	16	–	2	.889	26	–	7	.788
Bucknell	15	–	3	.833	22	–	10	.688
Navy	13	–	5	.722	25	–	8	.758
Army	9	–	9	.500	17	–	14	.548
Lehigh	9	–	9	.500	15	–	15	.500
Holy Cross	7	–	11	.389	12	–	18	.400
Loyola (MD)	7	–	11	.389	9	–	21	.300
Lafayette	6	–	12	.333	11	–	19	.367
Boston University	5	–	13	.278	10	–	19	.345
Colgate	3	–	15	.167	7	–	23	.233
† 2018 Patriot League tournament winner As of 16 March 2018; Rankings from AP poll

The 2017–18 American Eagles women's basketball team represented American University during the 2017–18 NCAA Division I women's basketball season. The Eagles, led by fifth year head coach Megan Gebbia, played their home games at Bender Arena and were members of the Patriot League. They finished the season 26–7, 16–2 in Patriot League play to win the Patriot League regular season title. They won the Patriot League women's tournament by defeating Navy and earned an automatic trip to the NCAA women's tournament, where they lost to UCLA in the first round.

== Previous season ==
They finished the season 15–16, 11–7 in Patriot League play to finish in a tie for fourth place. They advanced to the semifinals of the Patriot League women's tournament where they lost to Bucknell.

== Roster ==
2017–18 American Eagles women's basketball team
Players
Coaches

Pos.	#	Name	Height	Year	Previous school	Hometown
F	2	Morgan Bartner	6 ft 2 in (1.88 m)	Jr	Morristown Beard	Florham Park, NJ
G	3	Kaitlyn Lewis	5 ft 7 in (1.7 m)	Jr	North Pocono	Scranton, PA
G	4	Emily Kinneston	5 ft 8 in (1.73 m)	Sr	Champlain Valley Union	Shelburne, VT
G	5	Asha Henley (W)	5 ft 5 in (1.65 m)	Sr	Blake	Sliver Spring, MD
F	10	Io Chaney	5 ft 11 in (1.8 m)	Sr	St. Vincent Pallotti; Norfolk State	Bowie, MD
F	11	TaeKenya Cleveland	6 ft 0 in (1.83 m)	So	Regis Jesuit	Aurora, CO
G	12	Indeya Sanders	5 ft 5 in (1.65 m)	Fr	Herndon	Reston, VA
F	14	Maria Liddane	5 ft 8 in (1.73 m)	Sr	Grosse Point North	Grosse Pointe Woods, MI
G	21	Kate Bond	5 ft 9 in (1.75 m)	Sr	Mount St. Mary	Norman, OK
G	22	Katie Marenyi	5 ft 8 in (1.73 m)	So	Penn	Granger, IN
G	23	Elina Koskimies	6 ft 0 in (1.83 m)	Jr	Makelanrinne Sports High	Helsinki, Finland
F	33	Michael Harris	6 ft 1 in (1.85 m)	Sr	Abington	Abington, PA
F	42	Maddie Royle	6 ft 1 in (1.85 m)	Fr	Oakton	Oakton, VA
F	44	Cecily Carl	6 ft 3 in (1.91 m)	Jr	Mechanicsburg	Mechanicsburg, PA

Head coach

- Megan Gebbia (Towson)

Assistant coach(es)

- Tiffany Coll (UMBC)
- Nikki Flores (Marist)
- Emily Stallings (Marist)

Legend

- (C) Team captain
- (S) Suspended
- (I) Ineligible
- (W) Walk-on
- Injured
- Current redshirt

Roster
Last update: January 6, 2018

== Schedule ==
Date time, TV	Rank^{#}	Opponent^{#}	Result	Record	Site (attendance) city, state
Non-conference regular season
11/10/2017*; 8:00 pm		at Tulsa	W 72–67	1–0	Reynolds Center (322); Tulsa, OK
11/13/2017*; 7:00 pm		La Salle	W 66–48	2–0	Bender Arena (390); Washington, D.C.
11/16/2017*; 7:00 pm		at Delaware	L 56–72	2–1	Bob Carpenter Center (1,466); Newark, DE
11/20/2017*; 7:00 pm		at George Mason	L 53–71	2–2	EagleBank Arena (481); Fairfax, VA
11/24/2017*; 5:00 pm, ESPN3		at Vermont; TD Bank Classic semifinals	W 64–62	3–2	Patrick Gym (906); Burlington, VT
11/25/2017*; 7:00 pm		vs. Villanova; TD Bank Classic championship	L 60–65	3–3	Patrick Gym (406); Burlington, VT
11/29/2017*; 7:00 pm, ESPN3		at UMBC	W 61–48	4–3	Retriever Activities Center (320); Catonsville, MD
12/02/2017*; 2:00 pm		Youngstown State	W 78–72 ^{OT}	5–3	Bender Arena (280); Washington, D.C.
12/09/2017*; 12:00 pm		Denver	W 66–53	6–3	Bender Arena (182); Washington, D.C.
12/17/2017*; 2:00 pm		at George Washington	L 44–61	6–4	Charles E. Smith Center (653); Washington, D.C.
12/20/2017*; 1:00 pm		Penn State	W 75–66 ^{OT}	7–4	Bender Arena (372); Washington, D.C.
Patriot League regular season
12/29/2017; 7:00 pm		Bucknell	W 68–58	8–4 (1–0)	Bender Arena (332); Washington, D.C.
01/02/2018; 2:00 pm		at Colgate	W 77–55	9–4 (2–0)	Cotterell Court (211); Hamilton, NY
01/05/2018; 7:00 pm		Navy	W 46–41	10–4 (3–0)	Bender Arena (199); Washington, D.C.
01/08/2018; 7:00 pm		at Army	W 64–46	11–4 (4–0)	Christl Arena (403); West Point, NY
01/11/2018; 11:30 am		at Loyola (MD)	W 71–58	12–4 (5–0)	Reitz Arena (1,012); Baltimore, MD
01/14/2018; 3:00 pm		Lehigh	W 82–64	13–4 (6–0)	Bender Arena (435); Washington, D.C.
01/17/2018; 7:00 pm		Boston University	W 66–50	14–4 (7–0)	Bender Arena (436); Washington, D.C.
01/20/2018; 2:00 pm		at Lafayette	W 74–67	15–4 (8–0)	Kirby Sports Center (577); Easton, PA
01/24/2018; 7:00 pm		at Holy Cross	W 68–63 ^{OT}	16–4 (9–0)	Hart Center (933); Worcester, MA
01/27/2018; 2:00 pm		Colgate	W 67–44	17–4 (10–0)	Bender Arena (405); Washington, D.C.
02/03/2018; 2:00 pm		Army	W 71–63 ^{OT}	18–4 (11–0)	Bender Arena (665); Washington, D.C.
02/07/2018; 7:00 pm		Loyola (MD)	W 69–56	19–4 (12–0)	Bender Arena (322); Washington, D.C.
02/10/2018; 4:00 pm		at Lehigh	W 60–44	20–4 (13–0)	Stabler Arena (787); Bethlehem, PA
02/14/2018; 7:00 pm		at Boston University	W 61–54	21–4 (14–0)	Case Gym (211); Boston, MA
02/17/2018; 1:00 pm		Lafayette	W 74–66	22–4 (15–0)	Bender Arena (497); Washington, D.C.
02/21/2018; 11:30 am		Holy Cross	W 72–54	23–4 (16–0)	Bender Arena (514); Washington, D.C.
02/24/2018; 2:00 pm		at Bucknell	L 52–57	23–5 (16–1)	Sojka Pavilion (925); Lewisburg, PA
02/28/2018; 7:00 pm		at Navy	L 49–76	23–6 (16–2)	Alumni Hall (608); Annapolis, MD
Patriot League Women's Tournament
03/05/2018; 7:00 pm	(1)	(8) Lafayette; Quarterfinals	W 55–35	24–6	Bender Arena (501); Washington, D.C.
03/08/2018; 7:00 pm	(1)	(5) Army; Semifinals	W 60–49	25–6	Bender Arena (585); Washington, D.C.
03/11/2018; 11:00 am, CBSSN	(1)	(3) Navy; Championship Game	W 58–49	26–6	Bender Arena (1,001); Washington, D.C.
NCAA Women's Tournament
03/17/2018*; 3:30 pm, ESPN2	(14 KC)	at (3 KC) No. 9 UCLA; First Round	L 60–71	26–7	Pauley Pavilion (2,304); Los Angeles, CA
*Non-conference game. ^{#}Rankings from AP poll. (#) Tournament seedings in parentheses. KC=Kansas City Region. All times are in Eastern Time.

== See also ==
- 2017–18 American Eagles men's basketball team
