= Ea Semper =

1907 document on Eastern Catholics

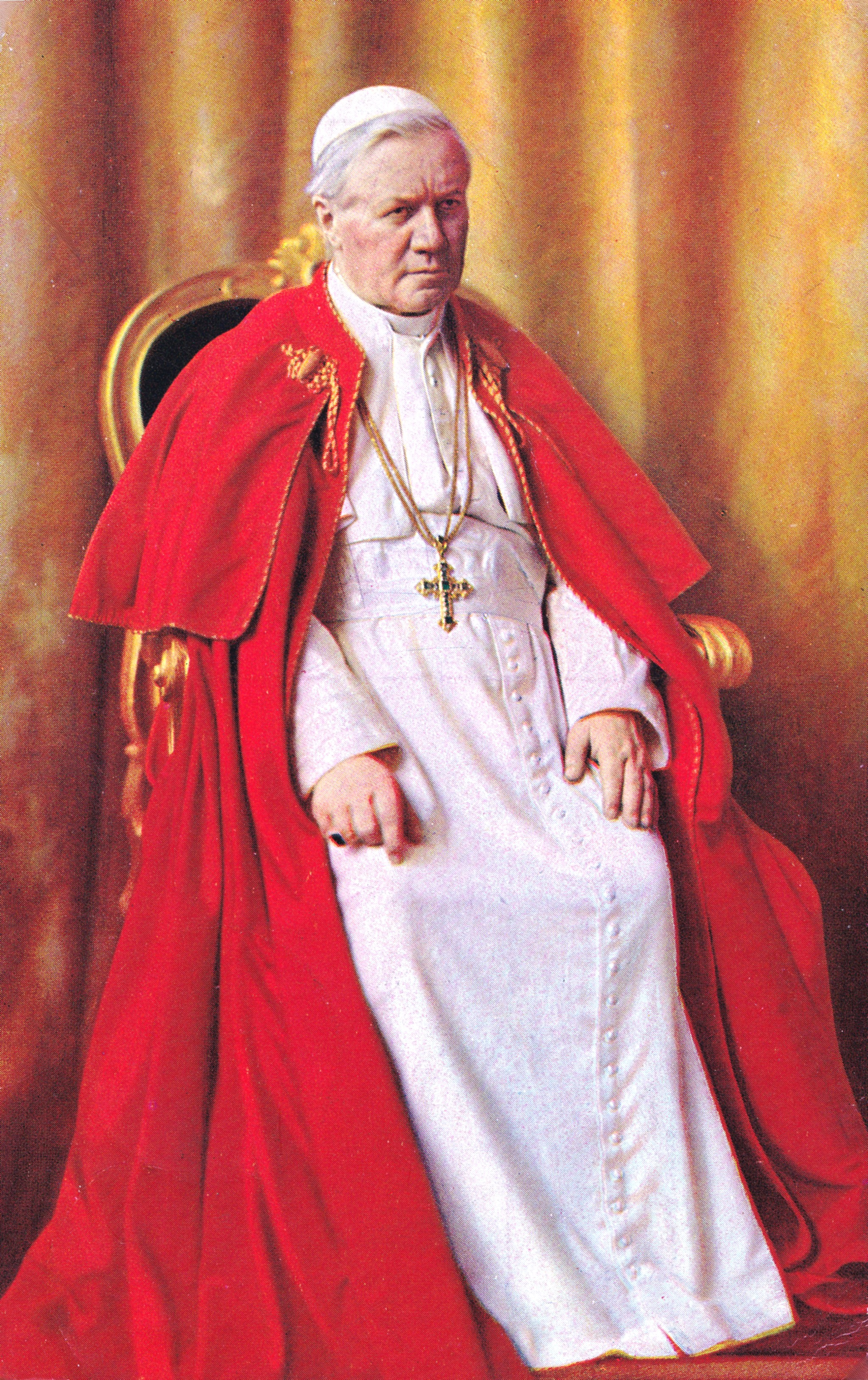
Pope Pius X in 1907

Ea Semper was an apostolic letter written by Pope Pius X in September 1907 that dealt with the governance of the Byzantine Rite Eastern Catholics in the United States. It dealt with the appointment of Soter Ortynsky as the first bishop of the Ruthenian Catholics in the United States, together with papal instructions concerning his powers and duties.

== Contents ==
The letter created considerable dissatisfaction among the American Greek Rite clergy and laity since it did not provide for any diocesan authority for their new bishop. Rather, it made him an auxiliary to Latin Church bishops, some of whom (such as Bishop John Ireland in Minnesota) were notoriously hostile to the existence of the Eastern Catholic Churches.

Furthermore, it also modified several aspects of Eastern Catholic liturgy that differed from the Latin liturgical rites. Confirmation was no longer to be conferred at baptism. and could now be given only by a bishop (not a priest, as in the Eastern churches). No new married priests were to be ordained in America or to be sent to America. The pope's missive also mandated changes to the regulations governing marriages between persons in the Latin and Byzantine Rite.

These concessions to the demands of anti-Byzantine Latin bishops were made, however, in order to secure their grudging agreement to having a bishop from the Eastern Catholic Churches within their midst and were always intended to be temporary. The driving force for the appointment of Bishop Soter Ortynsky in the first place had been Metropolitan bishop Andrey Sheptytsky of the Ukrainian Greek Catholic Church, who had persuaded the Holy See that establishing a Byzantine Rite hierarchy in the United States was a necessity to stave off further defections to Orthodoxy. Furthermore, on 28 May, 1913, Pope Pius X felt secure enough to remove all remaining restrictions upon Bishop Soter Ortynsky, who was granted full jurisdiction over all Rusyn and Ukrainian American Byzantine Catholics and was made completely independent of the local Roman Rite Bishops.

== Reaction ==
Dissatisfaction with the letter resulted in many conversions to Russian Orthodoxy, particularly in America; it continued a movement that began in 1892 under Alexis Toth, who was later canonized by the Orthodox Church in America. Although many historians now insist that Pan-Slavic and Tsarist political ideology were every bit as much at play as theology, a further 80,000 Greek Catholic parishioners defected to Orthodoxy after the publication of the letter.

The Orthodox Church in America claims that by 1916, the Eastern Catholic Churches had lost 163 Uniate parishes, with over 100,000 faithful, to the Russian missionary diocese.

In an effort "to return the favor", during two audiences in 1907 and 1908, Pope Pius X secretly granted Metropolitan Andrey Sheptytsky the authority of a Patriarch over the Russian Empire, with the intention of creating an underground Russian Greek Catholic Church. This ultimately resulted in Sheptytsky organizing the first Byzantine Catholic Apostolic Exarchate of Russia and assigning Leonid Feodorov to lead it following the February Revolution of 1917.
