= 2017–18 Army Black Knights women's basketball team =

Intercollegiate basketball season

2017–18 Army Black Knights women's basketball
- Conference: Patriot League
- Record: 17–14 (9–9 Patriot)
- Head coach: Dave Magarity (12th season)
- Assistant coaches: Colleen Mullen; Lisa Strack; Melissa Brooks; Megan Methven
- Home arena: Christl Arena

2017–18 Patriot League women's basketball standings
	Conf.				Overall
Team	W		L	PCT	W		L	PCT
American †	16	–	2	.889	26	–	7	.788
Bucknell	15	–	3	.833	22	–	10	.688
Navy	13	–	5	.722	25	–	8	.758
Army	9	–	9	.500	17	–	14	.548
Lehigh	9	–	9	.500	15	–	15	.500
Holy Cross	7	–	11	.389	12	–	18	.400
Loyola (MD)	7	–	11	.389	9	–	21	.300
Lafayette	6	–	12	.333	11	–	19	.367
Boston University	5	–	13	.278	10	–	19	.345
Colgate	3	–	15	.167	7	–	23	.233
† 2018 Patriot League tournament winner As of 16 March 2018; Rankings from AP poll

The 2017–18 Army Black Knights men's basketball team represented the United States Military Academy during the 2017–18 NCAA Division I women's basketball season. The Black Knights, led by twelfth year head coach Dave Magarity, played their home games at Christl Arena and were members of the Patriot League. They finished the season 17–14, 9–9 in Patriot League play to finish in a tie for fourth place. They advanced to the semifinals of the Patriot League women's tournament where they lost to American.

== Previous season ==
They finished the season 22–9, 12–6 in Patriot League play to finish in third place. They advanced to the semifinals of the Patriot League women's tournament where they lost to Navy. Despite having 22 wins, they missed the postseason tournament for the first time since 2014.

== Roster ==
2017–18 Army Black Knights women's basketball team
Players
Coaches

Pos.	#	Name	Height	Year	Previous school	Hometown
G	0	Gabby White	5 ft 7 in (1.7 m)	Fr	North Royalton	Cleveland, OH
G	1	Cori Schnell	5 ft 8 in (1.73 m)	So	Prince of Peace Christian School	Plano, TX
G	2	Morgann Yancey	5 ft 8 in (1.73 m)	So	Plano West	Dallas, TX
G	3	Jess Lewis	5 ft 9 in (1.75 m)	Jr	Regis Jesuit	Denver, CO
F	4	Margaret Anne Hubbell	5 ft 9 in (1.75 m)	Sr	Germantown Academy	Doylestown, PA
G	10	Aliyah Murray	5 ft 10 in (1.78 m)	Sr	Delran; USMAPS	Delran, NJ
F/C	13	Lena' Hicks	6 ft 4 in (1.93 m)	Sr	Elkton; USMAPS	Charlotte, NC
G	20	Destinee Morris	5 ft 7 in (1.7 m)	Sr	Centennial	Lino Lakes, MN
G	21	Janae McNeal	5 ft 9 in (1.75 m)	Sr	Courtland; USMAPS	Spotsylvania, VA
G/F	22	Shelby Haynes	5 ft 11 in (1.8 m)	So	West Springfield	Brandon, MS
G	23	Daizjah Morris	5 ft 7 in (1.7 m)	Sr	Centennial	Lino Lakes, MN
F	25	Jessica Rawls	6 ft 0 in (1.83 m)	Fr	Central Dauphin East Senior	Harrisburg, PA
F	33	Liz Layne	6 ft 0 in (1.83 m)	Fr	Elkhorn South	Omaha, NE
F	34	Julia Gibbs	5 ft 10 in (1.78 m)	So	Mills	Millbrae, CA
F	41	Madison Hovren	5 ft 11 in (1.8 m)	Jr	Central Valley	Spokane, WA
G	44	Libby Tacka	5 ft 9 in (1.75 m)	So	Mount Saint Joseph Academy	Blue Bell, PA

Head coach

- Dave Magarity (Saint Francis (PA))

Assistant coach(es)

- Colleen Mullen (New Hampshire)
- Lisa Strack (American)
- Melissa Brooks (Holy Family)
- Megan Methven (Stonehill)

Legend

- (C) Team captain
- (S) Suspended
- (I) Ineligible
- (W) Walk-on
- Injured
- Current redshirt

Roster
Last update: January 6, 2018

== Schedule ==
Date time, TV	Rank^{#}	Opponent^{#}	Result	Record	Site (attendance) city, state
Non-conference regular season
11/10/2017*; 7:00 pm		Binghamton	W 73–61	1–0	Christl Arena (728); West Point, NY
11/13/2017*; 7:00 pm		at Fairleigh Dickinson	L 56–58	1–1	Rothman Center (175); Teaneck, NJ
11/16/2017*; 7:00 pm		at St. Francis Brooklyn	L 52–73	1–2	Generoso Pope Athletic Complex (100); Brooklyn, NY
11/20/2017*; 7:00 pm		LIU Brooklyn	W 71–37	2–2	Christl Arena (418); West Point, NY
11/22/2017*; 5:00 pm		NJIT	W 79–49	3–2	Christl Arena (428); West Point, NY
11/26/2017*; 2:00 pm		at Yale	W 82–65	4–2	John J. Lee Amphitheater (502); New Haven, CT
11/29/2017*; 7:00 pm		Dartmouth	W 71–56	5–2	Christl Arena (460); West Point, NY
12/02/2017*; 3:00 pm		at Air Force	W 65–59	6–2	Clune Arena (634); Colorado Springs, CO
12/06/2017*; 7:00 pm		Delaware	L 59–70	6–3	Christl Arena (432); West Point, NY
12/10/2017*; 4:00 pm		at Marquette	L 53–83	6–4	Al McGuire Center (1,219); Milwaukee, WI
12/16/2017*; 1:00 pm		St. Joseph's–Brooklyn	W 107–46	7–4	Christl Arena (1,325); West Point, NY
Patriot League regular season
12/29/2017; 3:00 pm		Boston University	L 59–60	7–5 (0–1)	Christl Arena (605); West Point, NY
01/02/2018; 7:00 pm		at Loyola (MD)	W 69–62	8–5 (1–1)	Reitz Arena (216); Baltimore, MD
01/05/2018; 6:00 pm		at Bucknell	L 36–60	8–6 (1–2)	Sojka Pavilion (1,007); Lewisburg, PA
01/08/2018; 6:00 pm		American	L 46–64	8–7 (1–3)	Christl Arena (403); West Point, NY
01/11/2018; 7:00 pm		at Lafayette	W 65–60	9–7 (2–3)	Kirby Sports Center (486); Easton, PA
01/14/2018; 12:00 pm, CBSSN		at Navy	L 44–70	9–8 (2–4)	Alumni Hall (5,710); Annapolis, MD
01/17/2018; 7:00 pm		Holy Cross	L 62–70 ^{OT}	9–9 (2–5)	Christl Arena (463); West Point, NY
01/20/2018; 2:00 pm		at Lehigh	L 55–59	9–10 (2–6)	Stabler Arena (634); Bethlehem, PA
01/24/2018; 7:00 pm		at Colgate	W 62–54	10–10 (3–6)	Cotterell Court (133); Hamilton, NY
01/27/2018; 3:00 pm		Loyola (MD)	W 62–47	11–10 (4–6)	Christl Arena (949); West Point, NY
02/03/2018; 2:00 pm		at American	L 63–71 ^{OT}	11–11 (4–7)	Bender Arena (665); Washington, D.C.
02/07/2018; 7:00 pm		Lafayette	W 48–39	12–11 (5–7)	Christl Arena (432); West Point, NY
02/10/2018; 11:00 am, CBSSN		Navy	L 46–55	12–12 (5–8)	Christl Arena (5,181); West Point, NY
02/14/2018; 7:00 pm		at Holy Cross	W 66–57	13–12 (6–8)	Hart Center (889); Worcester, MA
02/17/2018; 1:00 pm		Lehigh	W 55–50	14–12 (7–8)	Christl Arena (621); West Point, NY
02/21/2018; 11:00 am		Colgate	W 69–49	15–12 (8–8)	Christl Arena (634); West Point, NY
02/24/2018; 2:00 pm		at Boston University	W 48–47	16–12 (9–8)	Case Gym (407); Boston, MA
02/28/2018; 7:00 pm		Bucknell	L 36–60	16–13 (9–9)	Christl Arena (578); West Point, NY
Patriot League Women's Tournament
03/05/2018; 6:00 pm	(5)	at (4) Lehigh; Quarterfinals	W 62–60	17–13	Stabler Arena (483); Bethlehem, PA
03/05/2018; 7:00 pm	(5)	at (1) American; Semifinals	L 49–60	17–14	Bender Arena (585); Washington, D.C.
*Non-conference game. ^{#}Rankings from AP Poll. (#) Tournament seedings in parentheses. All times are in Eastern Time.

== Rankings ==
2017–18 NCAA Division I women's basketball rankings

+ Regular season polls	Poll	Pre- Season	Week 2	Week 3	Week 4	Week 5	Week 6	Week 7	Week 8	Week 9	Week 10	Week 11	Week 12	Week 13	Week 14	Week 15	Week 16	Week 17	Week 18	Week 19	Final
AP																				N/A	
Coaches																					

Legend
	Increase in ranking
	Decrease in ranking
	No change
(RV)	Received votes
(NR)	Not ranked

== See also ==
2017–18 Army Black Knights men's basketball team
