= 2018 Patriot League women's basketball tournament =

College basketball tournament

- Classification: Division I
- Season: 2017–18
- Teams: 10
- Site: Campus sites
- Champions: American (2nd title)
- Winning coach: Megan Gebbia (2nd title)
- MVP: Cecily Carl (American)
- Television: PLN, CBSSN

2017–18 Patriot League women's basketball standings
| | Conf. | | | | Overall |
| Team | W | | L | PCT | W | | L | PCT |
|---|---|---|---|---|---|---|---|---|
| American † | 16 | – | 2 | .889 | 26 | – | 7 | .788 |
| Bucknell | 15 | – | 3 | .833 | 22 | – | 10 | .688 |
| Navy | 13 | – | 5 | .722 | 25 | – | 8 | .758 |
| Army | 9 | – | 9 | .500 | 17 | – | 14 | .548 |
| Lehigh | 9 | – | 9 | .500 | 15 | – | 15 | .500 |
| Holy Cross | 7 | – | 11 | .389 | 12 | – | 18 | .400 |
| Loyola (MD) | 7 | – | 11 | .389 | 9 | – | 21 | .300 |
| Lafayette | 6 | – | 12 | .333 | 11 | – | 19 | .367 |
| Boston University | 5 | – | 13 | .278 | 10 | – | 19 | .345 |
| Colgate | 3 | – | 15 | .167 | 7 | – | 23 | .233 |
† 2018 Patriot League tournament winner As of 16 March 2018; Rankings from AP poll

The 2018 Patriot League women's basketball tournament was from held March 3, 5, 8 and 10 at campus sites of the higher seed, except that both semi-final games will be played at the same site of the highest seed. American won the Patriot League Tournament will earn an automatic trip to the NCAA women's tournament.

== Seeds ==
Teams are seeded by conference record, with ties broken in the following order:

- Head-to-head record between the teams involved in the tie
- Record against the highest-seeded team not involved in the tie, going down through the seedings as necessary
- Higher RPI entering the tournament, as published by College Basketball News

| Seed | School | Conference | Overall | Tiebreaker |
|---|---|---|---|---|
| 1 | American | 16–2 | 23–6 | |
| 2 | Bucknell | 15–3 | 21–8 | |
| 3 | Navy | 13–5 | 23–6 | |
| 4 | Lehigh | 9–9 | 15–14 | 1–1 vs. Army |
| 5 | Army | 9–9 | 16–13 | 1–1 vs. Lehigh |
| 6 | Loyola (MD) | 7–11 | 9–20 | 2–0 vs. Holy Cross |
| 7 | Holy Cross | 7–11 | 12–17 | 0–2 vs. Loyola (MD) |
| 8 | Lafayette | 6–12 | 10–18 | |
| 9 | Boston University | 5–13 | 10–18 | |
| 10 | Colgate | 3–15 | 7–22 | |

== Schedule ==
| Game | Time* | Matchup | Television | Attendance |
First round – Saturday, March 3
| 1 | 1:00 PM | #10 Colgate at #7 Holy Cross | PLN | 537 |
| 2 | 2:00 PM | #9 Boston University at #8 Lafayette | PLN | 435 |
Quarterfinals – Monday, March 5
| 3 | 7:00 PM | #8 Lafayette at #1 American | PLN | 501 |
| 4 | 6:00 PM | #7 Holy Cross at #2 Bucknell | PLN | 594 |
| 5 | 7:00 PM | #6 Loyola (MD) at #3 Navy | PLN | 487 |
| 6 | 6:00 PM | #5 Army at #4 Lehigh | PLN | 483 |
Semifinals – Thursday, March 8
| 7 | 7:00 PM | #5 Army at #1 American | PLN | 585 |
| 8 | 6:00 PM | #3 Navy at #2 Bucknell | PLN | 619 |
Championship – Sunday, March 11
| 9 | 11:00 am | #3 Navy at #1 American | CBSSN | 1,001 |
*Game times in ET. #-Rankings denote tournament seeding. All games hosted by higher-seeded team.

== Bracket ==
First round March 3 Patriot League Network
8 | Lafayette | 66
9 | Boston University | 61
10 | Colgate | 47
7 | Holy Cross | 66

Quarterfinals; March 5 Patriot League Network
1 | American | 55
8 | Lafayette | 35
4 | Lehigh | 60
5 | Army | 62
2 | Bucknell | 67
7 | Holy Cross | 53
3 | Navy | 63
6 | Loyola (MD) | 55

Semifinals; March 8 Patriot League Network
1 | American | 60
5 | Army | 49
2 | Bucknell | 62
3 | Navy | 68

Championship; March 11; CBS Sports Network
1 | American | 58
3 | Navy | 49
