= Helena Langevych =

Polish-Ukrainian Roman Catholic nun and co-founder of Manor College (1881–1916)

Mother Helena Langevych OSBM
- Олена Лянґевич
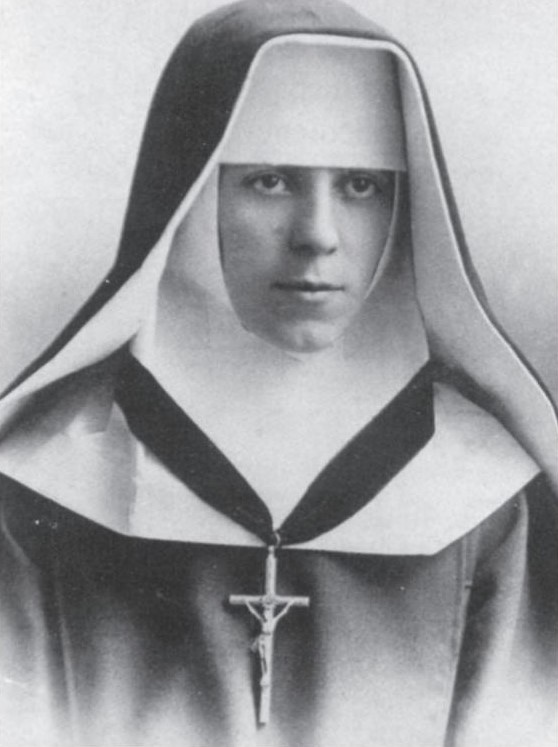

Personal life
- Born: January 24, 1881 Zhovkva, Ukraine
- Died: May 7, 1916 (aged 35)

Religious life
- Religion: Roman Catholicism

Helena Emilia Langevych (Ukrainian: Олена Лянґевич; 1881–1916) was a Ukrainian nun who led a group of Sisters of the Order of Saint Basil the Great to the United States on November 28, 1911. Langevych brought the sisters at the specific request of Soter Ortynsky OSBM, the Philadelphia-based first bishop for all Catholics in America who observed the Byzantine Rite. He was concerned about what to do with Ukrainian orphans in the city. Langevych is considered one of the founders of Manor College (originally named St. Macrina College). She was also the first abbess of the monastery, which she established.

Her work grew to include newly arrived Ukrainian immigrants to the Philadelphia area. Matthew Smalarz calls her "the foundress of the Sisters of St. Basil the Great in America." The Mother Helena Langevych Legacy Society is named in her honor. Many of her papers are in the Falvey Library of Villanova University, mostly in Ukrainian. She is sometimes referred to as Helen, or by her Christian name, Emilia-Helena.Her parents, Katarzyna Dashkevych and Michal Langevych, were Polish but lived in Ukraine.
