= 2017–18 Bucknell Bison women's basketball team =

Intercollegiate basketball season

2017–18 Bucknell Bison women's basketball

WNIT, First Round
- Conference: Patriot League
- Record: 22–10 (15–3 Patriot)
- Head coach: Aaron Roussell (6th season)
- Assistant coaches: Mike Lane; Jeanine Radice; Brittany Pinkney
- Home arena: Sojka Pavilion

2017–18 Patriot League women's basketball standings
	Conf.				Overall
Team	W		L	PCT	W		L	PCT
American †	16	–	2	.889	26	–	7	.788
Bucknell	15	–	3	.833	22	–	10	.688
Navy	13	–	5	.722	25	–	8	.758
Army	9	–	9	.500	17	–	14	.548
Lehigh	9	–	9	.500	15	–	15	.500
Holy Cross	7	–	11	.389	12	–	18	.400
Loyola (MD)	7	–	11	.389	9	–	21	.300
Lafayette	6	–	12	.333	11	–	19	.367
Boston University	5	–	13	.278	10	–	19	.345
Colgate	3	–	15	.167	7	–	23	.233
† 2018 Patriot League tournament winner As of 16 March 2018; Rankings from AP poll

The 2017–18 Bucknell Bison women's basketball team represented Bucknell University during the 2017–18 NCAA Division I women's basketball season. The Bison, led by seventh-year head coach Aaron Roussell, played their home games at Sojka Pavilion and were members of the Patriot League. They finished the season 22–10, 15–3 in Patriot League play to finish in second place. They advanced to the semifinals of the Patriot League women's tournament, where they lost to Army. They received an automatic bid to the Women's National Invitation Tournament, where they lost to West Virginia in the first round.

== Previous season ==
They finished the season 27–6, 16–2 in Patriot League play to win the Patriot League regular season title. They won the Patriot League women's tournament to earn an automatic trip to the NCAA women's tournament for the first time since 2008, where they lost to Maryland in the first round.

== Roster ==
2017–18 Bucknell Bison women's basketball team
Players
Coaches

Pos.	#	Name	Height	Year	Previous school	Hometown
G	2	Kyi English	5 ft 5 in (1.65 m)	Jr	East Orange	East Orange, NJ
F	3	Tessa Brugler	6 ft 1 in (1.85 m)	Fr	Nazareth	Nazareth, PA
G	4	Gia Hayes	5 ft 8 in (1.73 m)	So	eStem High Public Charter School	Maumelle, AR
G	13	Rachael Dumiak	5 ft 11 in (1.8 m)	Jr	La Costa Canyon	Carlsbad, CA
G	20	Kate Walker	6 ft 0 in (1.83 m)	Jr	Red Oak Community	Red Oak, IA
F	22	Maegan Mikkelsen	6 ft 3 in (1.91 m)	Jr	Woodbridge	Woodbridge, VA
G	23	Ally Johnson	5 ft 10 in (1.78 m)	Fr	Beechwood	Fort Mitchell, KY
F	24	Autumn Ceppi	6 ft 1 in (1.85 m)	Fr	Dana Hall	Bedford, MA
G	25	Abby Kapp	6 ft 0 in (1.83 m)	Fr	Boyertown	Barto, PA
F	32	Catherine Romaine	6 ft 2 in (1.88 m)	Sr	Chapel Hill	Chapel Hill, NC
G	33	Carly Richardson	5 ft 11 in (1.8 m)	Sr	Palmyra	Palmyra, PA
G	40	Ellie Mack	6 ft 2 in (1.88 m)	So	Conestoga	Paoli, PA
F	50	Kaitlyn Slagus	6 ft 2 in (1.88 m)	Jr	Belle Vernon	Belle Vernon, PA
F	54	MK Moore	6 ft 5 in (1.96 m)	So	St. Thomas Aquinas	Fort Lauderdale, FL

Head coach

- Aaron Roussell (Iowa)

Assistant coach(es)

- Mike Lane (Notre Dame)
- Jeanine Radice (Fordham)
- Brittany Pinkney (VCU)

Legend

- (C) Team captain
- (S) Suspended
- (I) Ineligible
- (W) Walk-on
- Injured
- Current redshirt

Roster
Last update: January 6, 2018

== Schedule ==
Date time, TV	Rank^{#}	Opponent^{#}	Result	Record	Site (attendance) city, state
Non-conference regular season
11/10/2017*; 5:30 pm		at Rider	W 76–71	1–0	Alumni Gymnasium (892); Lawrenceville, NJ
11/12/2017*; 2:00 pm		Akron	W 63–52	2–0	Sojka Pavilion (722); Lewisburg, PA
11/15/2017*; 6:00 pm		Saint Joseph's	L 53–77	2–1	Sojka Pavilion (704); Lewisburg, PA
11/18/2017*; 2:00 pm		at Drexel	L 54–63	2–2	Daskalakis Athletic Center (582); Philadelphia, PA
11/21/2017*; 6:00 pm		St. Bonaventure	L 48–59	2–3	Sojka Pavilion (621); Lewisburg, PA
11/24/2017*; 1:00 pm, ESPN3		at Youngstown State	W 66–60	3–3	Beeghly Center (1,393); Youngstown, OH
11/26/2017*; 2:00 pm		Canisius	W 76–57	4–3	Sojka Pavilion (595); Lewisburg, PA
11/29/2017*; 6:00 pm		Binghamton	W 64–59	5–3	Sojka Pavilion (600); Lewisburg, PA
12/03/2017*; 1:00 pm, ESPN3		at Iona	W 60–53	6–3	Hynes Athletic Center (550); New Rochelle, NY
12/17/2017*; 2:00 pm		at Fordham	L 62–71	6–4	Rose Hill Gymnasium (883); Bronx, NY
12/20/2017*; 2:00 pm, ACCN Extra		at Pittsburgh	L 39–57	6–5	Peterson Events Center (432); Pittsburgh, PA
Patriot League regular season
12/29/2017; 7:00 pm		at American	L 58–68	6–6 (0–1)	Bender Arena (332); Washington, D.C.
01/02/2018; 2:00 pm		at Boston University	W 63–58	7–6 (1–1)	Case Gym (174); Boston, MA
01/05/2018; 6:00 pm		Army	W 60–36	8–6 (2–1)	Sojka Pavilion (1,007); Lewisburg, PA
01/08/2018; 11:00 am		Lafayette	W 83–53	9–6 (3–1)	Sojka Pavilion (1,638); Lewisburg, PA
01/11/2018; 6:00 pm		at Lehigh	L 62–66	9–7 (3–2)	Stabler Arena (582); Bethlehem, PA
01/14/2018; 2:00 pm		Colgate	W 77–57	11–7 (4–2)	Sojka Pavilion (790); Lewisburg, PA
01/17/2018; 6:00 pm		Loyola (MD)	L 65–68	11–8 (4–3)	Sojka Pavilion (614); Lewisburg, PA
01/20/2018; 1:00 pm		at Holy Cross	W 71–47	12–8 (5–3)	Hart Center (805); Worcester, MA
01/24/2018; 6:00 pm		Navy	W 47–39	13–8 (6–3)	Sojka Pavilion (639); Lewisburg, PA
01/27/2018; 2:00 pm		Boston University	W 67–57	13–8 (7–3)	Sojka Pavilion (805); Lewisburg, PA
02/03/2018; 2:00 pm		at Lafayette	W 80–57	14–8 (8–3)	Kirby Sports Center (877); Eaton, PA
02/07/2018; 6:00 pm		Lehigh	W 59–52	15–8 (9–3)	Sojka Pavilion (486); Lewisburg, PA
02/10/2018; 2:00 pm		at Colgate	W 63–42	16–8 (10–3)	Cotterell Court (439); Hamilton, NY
02/14/2018; 7:00 pm		at Loyola (MD)	W 74–69	17–8 (11–3)	Reitz Arena (202); Baltimore, MD
02/17/2018; 2:00 pm		Holy Cross	W 72–63	18–8 (12–3)	Sojka Pavilion (945); Lewisburg, PA
02/21/2018; 7:00 pm		at Navy	W 49–40	19–8 (13–3)	Alumni Hall (1,053); Annapolis, MD
02/24/2018; 2:00 pm		American	W 57–52	20–8 (14–3)	Sojka Pavilion (332); Lewisburg, PA
02/28/2018; 7:00 pm		at Army	W 75–55	21–8 (15–3)	Christl Arena (578); West Point, NY
Patriot League Women's Tournament
03/05/2018; 6:00 pm	(2)	(7) Holy Cross; Quarterfinals	W 67–53	22–8	Sojka Pavilion (594); Lewisburg, PA
03/08/2018; 6:00 pm	(2)	(3) Navy; Semifinals	L 62–68	22–9	Sojka Pavilion (619); Lewisburg, PA
WNIT
03/15/2018*; 7:00 pm		at West Virginia; First Round	L 50–83	22–10	WVU Coliseum (1,509); Morgantown, WV
*Non-conference game. ^{#}Rankings from AP Poll. (#) Tournament seedings in parentheses. All times are in Eastern Time.

== See also ==
- 2017–18 Bucknell Bison men's basketball team
