= Manor College =

Catholic college in Jenkintown, Pennsylvania

- Former name: Manor Junior College
- Motto: You Belong Here
- Type: Private college Bachelor's Degree Undergraduate
- Established: 1947
- Religious affiliation: Catholic Church (Sisters of St. Basil the Great)
- Endowment: $3.4 MM
- President: Jonathan Peri
- Students: 599
- Location: 700 Fox Chase Road, Abington, Pennsylvania, United States; 40.0859°N 75.1043°W
- Campus: Suburban
- Colours: Blue and white
- Nickname: Blue Jays
- Mascot: Manny the Blue Jay
- Website: www.manor.edu

Manor College is a private, Ukrainian Catholic college in Abington, Pennsylvania.

== History ==
Manor College was founded in 1947 by the Byzantine Ukrainian Catholic sisters of Saint Basil the Great, led by Mother Helena Emilia Langevych, OSBM. It is located in Jenkintown, Pennsylvania, a suburb of Philadelphia. In 1959, Manor College was chartered and incorporated in the Commonwealth of Pennsylvania. The college was approved by the State Council of Education Department of Instruction on June 17, 1964. The legal governing body of Manor College is the 21-member board of trustees, which includes lay men and women from the business and professional communities and religious Sisters of the Order of Saint Basil the Great.

Manor College is closely related to the Ukrainian Catholic Church. Manor's Ukrainian Heritage Studies Center was established in 1977. The UHSC encompasses four major areas: Academic Studies, a Ukrainian Library, a museum collection of Ukrainian traditional arts and an Archives Division.

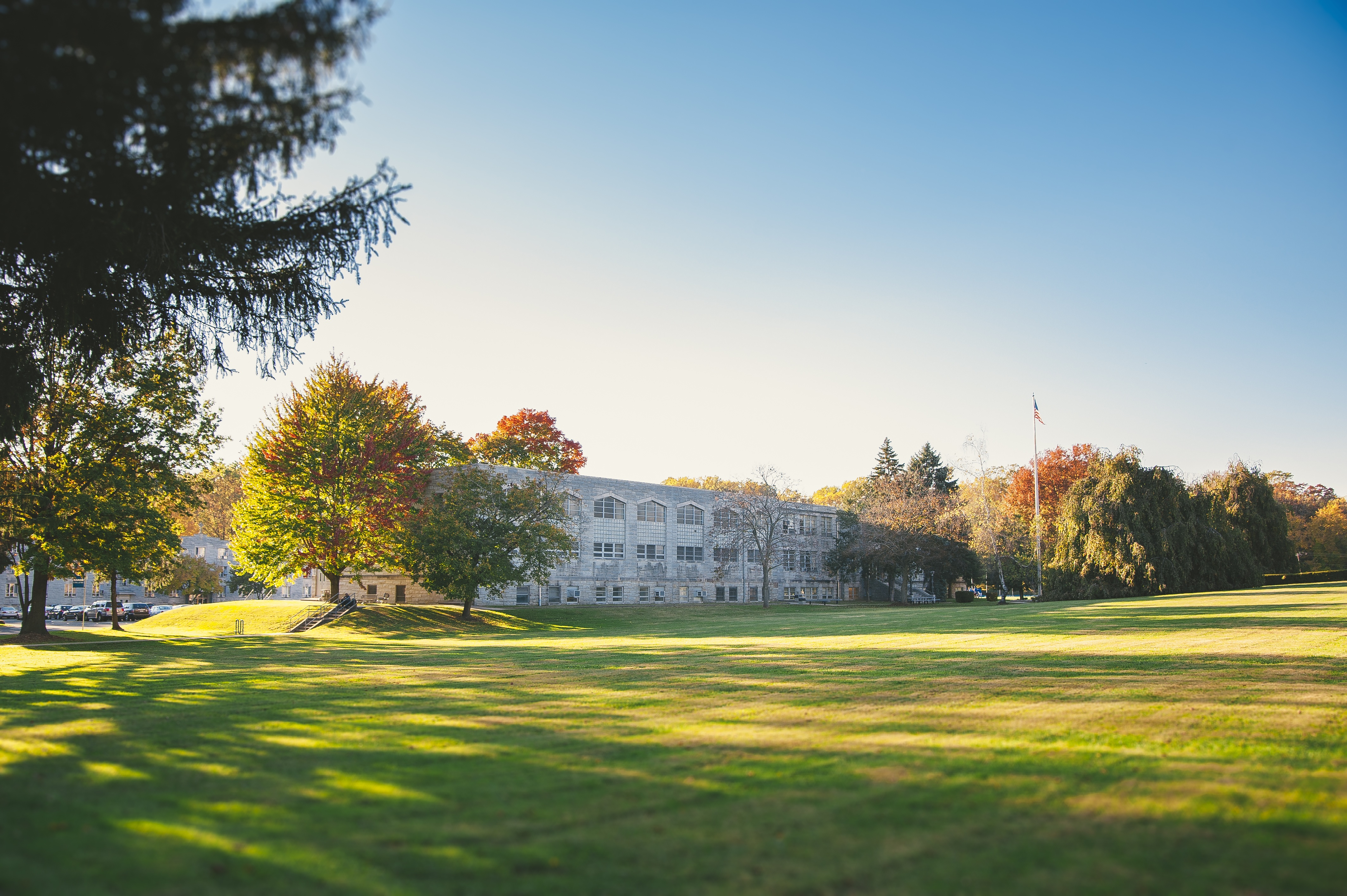
Manor College campus

The college froze tuition increases from 2016 to 2017. In 2018, Manor College announced that the institution would be offering bachelor's degree programs, beginning the fall 2018 semester. In November of the same year, the college announced a partnership with Widener Law School that would allow students to combine their undergraduate pre-law degree with a law degree from Widener University Delaware Law School as part of a "3+3" program. Students can also qualify for guaranteed admission to the law school.

In 2024, Manor College had an enrollment of 599 students.

== Adult education ==
Manor College is home to the Civil War Institute, a historical program that allows participants to examine this period of American history from new perspectives. Participating instructors are members of the Delaware Valley Civil War Round Table. The school also offers a number of continuing educational programs for real estate, legal and more. In keeping with the school's Ukrainian roots, several classes in Ukrainian culture and language are offered every semester for children and adults alike.

== Athletics ==
Manor College Athletics competes in the United States Collegiate Athletic Association (USCAA) in men's and women's soccer, men's and women's basketball, women's volleyball, baseball and outdoor track. In 2025, Manor College introduced women's flag football and men's volleyball. Manor is a member of the Eastern States Athletic Conference.

== Notable people ==
- Emellia Prokopik, nun of the Catholic Church in Ukraine and general superior of her congregation from 1971–1983. She served a term as academic dean.

== See also ==
- Basil of Caesarea
- Ukrainian Greek Catholic Church
