= Boston University–Holy Cross rivalry =

American college basketball rivalry

Boston University–Holy Cross
- Boston University Terriers Holy Cross Crusaders
- Sport: All sports
- Trophy: Turnpike Trophy

Locations of Boston University and Holy Cross

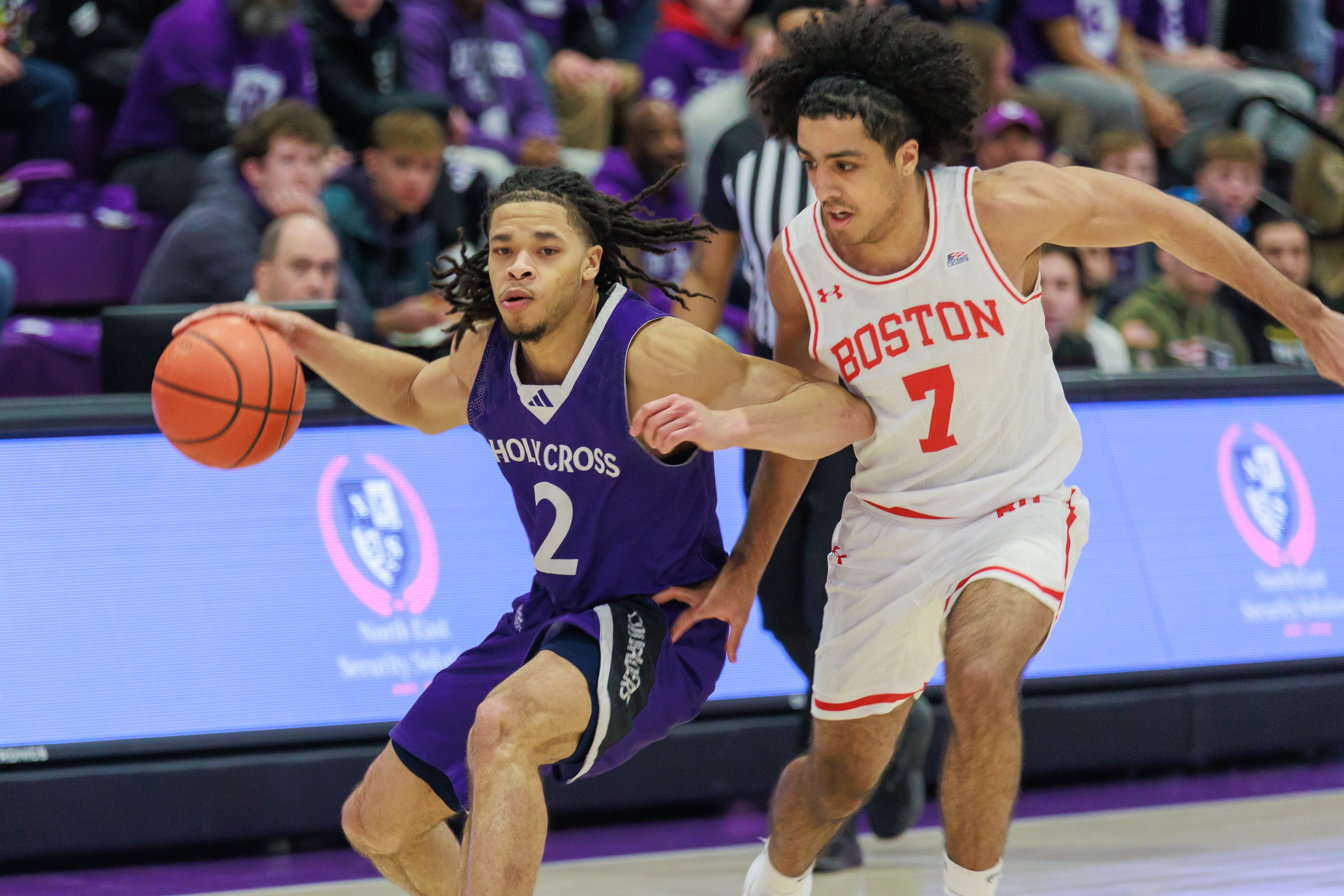
DeAndre Williams of Holy Cross, and Azmar Abdullah of Boston University

The Boston University–Holy Cross rivalry is an American college rivalry that exists between the Boston University Terriers sports teams of Boston University and the Holy Cross Crusaders sports teams of The College of the Holy Cross. The Terriers and Crusaders have a program-wide rivalry called the Turnpike Trophy, which BU leads 10–0 as of 2026.

Both schools are members of the Patriot League. BU and Holy Cross had been conference rivals in the past prior to the former joining the Patriot League in 2013. The two schools were in the ECAC-North Conference (now known as the America East Conference) together from 1979–83, at which point the Crusaders departed for the Metro Atlantic Athletic Conference.

== All-time and Patriot League series results ==
| Sport | All-time series record | Patriot League series record | Last result |
|---|---|---|---|
| Men's Soccer | BU leads 12-1–2 | BU leads 4–1 | HC won 1–0 on Oct. 2, 2019 |
| Women's Soccer | BU leads 8–1 | BU leads 5–0 | HC won 2–1 on Oct. 23, 2019 |
| Men's Basketball | HC leads 56–18 | BU leads 7–3 | HC won 73–62 on Feb. 10, 2018 |
| Women's Basketball | HC leads 15–6 | HC leads 6–4 | BU won 64–58 on Feb. 10, 2018 |
| Men's Lacrosse | BU leads 3–2 | BU Leads 3–2 | BU won 9-4 on April 20, 2018 |
| Women's Lacrosse | BU leads 11–1 | BU leads 5–0 | BU won 16–7 on April 18, 2018 |
| Football | HC leads 17–10–3 | | BU won 44–18 on Sep. 18, 1993 |

Series led and games won by BU are shaded ██. Series led and games won by Holy Cross shaded ██. Head-to-head games/matches only

== Turnpike Trophy ==
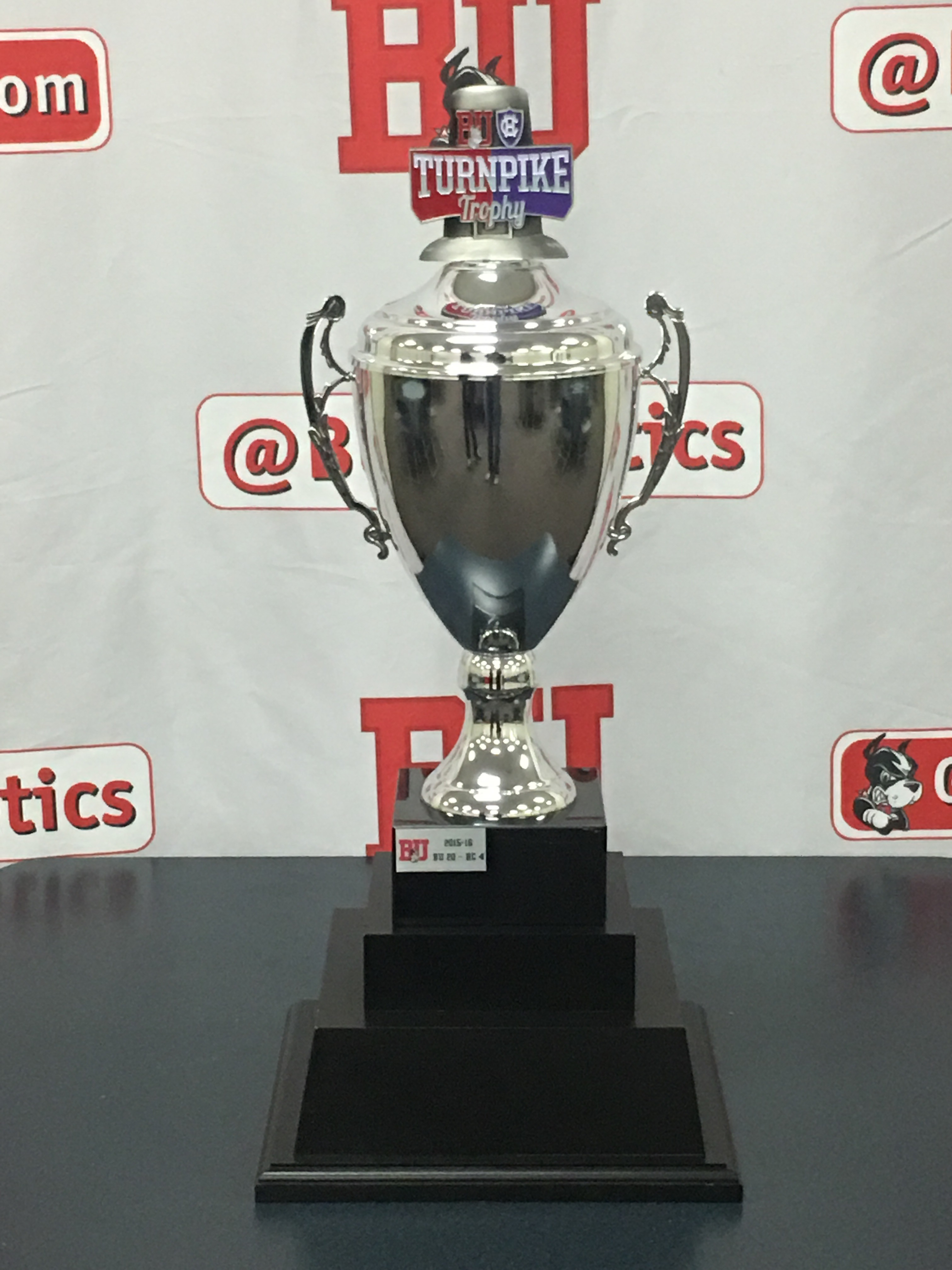
The Turnpike Trophy

Now in the same conference, the two schools agreed to face off for the Turnpike Trophy across all sports in 2015. BU won the inaugural trophy in 2015–2016 and leads the series 10–0. The trophy gets its name from the Massachusetts Turnpike, on which both schools are located about 42 miles away from each other.

In general, each head-to-head contest between the two schools in each sport is worth a single point in the standings. In softball, 1 point is awarded to the winner of the three game series. In sports that do not have head-to-head competition such as cross country, track & field, swimming & diving, rowing, and golf, 1 point is awarded to the school that finishes higher at the Patriot League Championships.

=== Yearly records ===
| Yearly Result; Overall Turnpike Trophy series | BU 20–4; BU led 1–0 | BU 21–1; BU led 2–0 | BU 21–4; BU led 3-0 | BU 21–3; BU led 4-0 | BU 14–2 (Note: Spring seasons cancelled due to COVID); BU led 5-0 | N/A (Note: Suspended due to COVID); BU led 5-0 | BU 17–4; BU led 6-0 | BU 12–8; BU led 7-0 | BU 15–8; BU led 8-0 | BU 15.5–4.5; BU led 9-0 | BU 15–4; BU led 10-0 |
| Sport | 2015–16 | 2016–17 | 2017-18 | 2018-19 | 2019-20 | 2020-21 | 2021-22 | 2022-23 | 2023-24 | 2024-25 | 2025-26 |
| Field Hockey | BU 1 point | BU 1 point | BU 2 points | BU 1 point | BU 1 point | Cancelled | BU 1 point | BU 1 point | BU 1 point | BU 1 point | BU 1 point |
| Men's Soccer | BU 1 point | BU 1 point | BU / HC 1 | BU 1 point | HC 1 point | Cancelled | BU 1 point | HC 1 point | BU 1 point | BU / HC .5 | BU 1 point |
| Women's Soccer | BU 1 point | BU 1 point | BU 1 point | BU 1 point | HC 1 point | Cancelled | BU 1 point | BU 1 point | HC 1 point | BU 1 point | BU 1 point |
| Men's Cross Country | BU 1 point | BU 1 point | BU 1 point | BU 1 point | BU 1 point | Cancelled | BU 1 point | N/A | N/A | N/A | N/A |
| Women's Cross Country | BU 1 point | HC 1 point | HC 1 point | BU 1 point | BU 1 point | Cancelled | BU 1 point | N/A | N/A | N/A | N/A |
| Men's Basketball | BU / HC 1 | BU 2 points | BU / HC 1 | BU 2 points | BU 2 points | Cancelled | BU / HC 1 | HC 2 points | BU / HC 1 | BU / HC 1 | BU 2 points |
| Women's Basketball | HC 2 points | BU 2 points | BU / HC 1 | HC 3 points | BU 2 points | Cancelled | BU / HC 1 | HC 2 / BU 1 | HC 2 / BU 1 | BU / HC 1 | HC 2 points |
| Men's Swimming/Diving | BU 1 point | BU 1 point | BU 1 point | BU 1 point | BU 1 point | Cancelled | BU 1 point | BU 1 point | BU 1 point | BU 1 point | BU 1 point |
| Women's Swimming/Diving | BU 1 point | BU 1 point | BU 1 point | BU 1 point | BU 1 point | Cancelled | BU 1 point | BU 1 point | BU 1 point | BU 1 point | BU 1 point |
| Men's Indoor Track and Field | BU 1 point | BU 1 point | BU 1 point | BU 1 point | BU 1 point | Cancelled | N/A | N/A | N/A | N/A | N/A |
| Women's Indoor Track and Field | BU 1 point | BU 1 point | BU 1 point | BU 1 point | BU 1 point | Cancelled | N/A | N/A | N/A | N/A | N/A |
| Men's Tennis | BU 1 point | Cancelled | BU 1 point | BU 1 point | Cancelled | Cancelled | N/A | BU 1 point | BU 2 points | HC 1 point | BU 1 point |
| Women's Tennis | BU 2 points | BU 1 point | BU 1 point | BU 1 point | Cancelled | Cancelled | BU 1 point | BU 1 point | BU 1 point | BU 1 point | BU 2 points |
| Women's Golf | BU 1 point | BU 1 point | BU 1 point | BU 1 point | Cancelled | Cancelled | BU 1 point | N/A | BU 1 point | N/A | N/A |
| Men's Lacrosse | HC 1 point | BU 1 point | BU 1 point | BU 1 point | Cancelled | Cancelled | BU 1 point | BU 1 point | BU 1 point | BU 1 point | BU 1 point |
| Women's Lacrosse | BU 1 point | BU 1 point | BU 1 point | BU 1 point | Cancelled | Cancelled | HC 1 point | HC 1 point | HC 1 point | HC 1 point | HC 1 point |
| Softball | BU 1 point | BU 1 point | BU 1 point | BU 1 point | Cancelled | Cancelled | BU 1 point | BU 3 points | BU 3 points | BU 3 points | BU 3 points |
| Men's Outdoor Track and Field | BU 1 point | BU 1 point | BU 1 point | BU 1 point | Cancelled | Cancelled | N/A | N/A | N/A | N/A | N/A |
| Women's Outdoor Track and Field | BU 1 point | BU 1 point | BU 1 point | BU 1 point | Cancelled | Cancelled | N/A | N/A | N/A | N/A | N/A |
| Men's Rowing | BU 1 point | BU 1 point | BU 1 point | N/A | N/A | N/A | N/A | N/A | N/A | N/A | N/A |
| Women's Rowing | BU 1 point | BU 1 point | BU 1 point | BU 1 point | Cancelled | Cancelled | N/A | N/A | N/A | N/A | N/A |
| Women's Ice Hockey | N/A | N/A | N/A | BU 3 points | BU 3 points | Cancelled | BU 2 / HC 1 | HC 2 / BU 1 | HC 3 / BU 1 | BU 3 points | BU / HC 1 |
| Mens's Ice Hockey | N/A | N/A | N/A | N/A | N/A | N/A | N/A | N/A | N/A | BU 1 point | N/A |
