= Saint Basil Academy (Jenkintown, Pennsylvania) =

- "Basil's"

Location
- 711 Fox Chase Road; Abington, (Montgomery County), Pennsylvania 19046; United States; 40°5′20″N 75°6′7″W

Information
- Type: Private, All-Female
- Motto: 'Educate the Girl, Empower the Woman, Enlighten the World'
- Religious affiliation: Ukrainian Catholic
- Established: 1931
- Closed: 2021
- CEEB code: 393450
- Principal: Connie D'Angelo
- Grades: 9-12
- Student to teacher ratio: 9:1
- Colors: White and Gold
- Mascot: Panther
- Team name: Panthers
- Accreditation: Middle States Association of Colleges and Schools
- Publication: Laureate (literary magazine)
- Newspaper: Basilian Pillar
- Yearbook: Basilianette
- Tuition: $11,300 per year
- Alumni: 3000+
- Vice Principal: Alexandra Penkalskyj
- Director of Development: Pamela D. Vasserman
- Director of Admissions: Kimberley Clearkin
- Director of Finance: Vincent Dolan
- Website: www.stbasilacademy.org

Saint Basil Academy was a private, Ukrainian Catholic, all-girls high school in Abington, Pennsylvania. It is located in the Ukrainian Catholic Archeparchy of Philadelphia and also within the Archdiocese of Philadelphia. Saint Basil Academy was established in 1931 by the Sisters of Saint Basil. On October 8, 2020, Saint Basil Academy announced that it would close its doors at the end of the 2020-2021 school year. The last class graduated on June 3, 2021.

== History ==
In the early part of the 20th century, the Sisters of Saint Basil came to the United States. In 1911, the Sisters came to Philadelphia at the invitation of His Excellency, the Most Reverend Soter Ortynsky, OSBM, who was the first Ukrainian Catholic Ordinary in America.

For the first few decades, the Sisters expanded their talents to the education of grade school children in the orphanage and parishes, but during these years, they did not forget the idea of a Catholic high school for girls. Saint Basil Academy, a convent boarding school for girls, began on July 19, 1931 in the classrooms of the newly constructed convent building dedicated only a day earlier.

Space and limited facilities on the main campus could no longer provide for updated laboratory and library expansion during the oncoming years. In 1968, the administration of the Sisters of Saint Basil the Great, undertook the construction of a new building, capable of housing 400 students.

== Program of study ==
Saint Basil Academy offered academic subjects with an emphasis on preparation for higher learning. Some of the courses were business-oriented and taught skills to those students who were interested in the business and computer fields. Electives were also offered in the fine arts.

== Course offerings ==
=== Art ===
- Art Appreciation
- Art I
- Art II
- Art III

=== Business ===
- Keyboarding with Computer Applications
- Accounting I
- Accounting II
- Business Communication
- Applied Economics
- Desktop Publishing

=== English Department ===
- Honors English I
- English I
- Honors English II
- English II
- Honors American Literature (Honors English III)
- American Literature (English III)
- Advanced Placement English
- British Literature (English IV)
- Literary Genres
- Journalism
- Creative Writing

=== Language Department ===
- French
  - French I
  - French II
  - French III
  - French IV
  - Advanced Placement French Language
- Latin
  - Our Classical Roots
  - Latin I
  - Latin II
  - Latin III
  - Latin IV
- Spanish
  - Spanish I
  - Spanish II
  - Spanish III
  - Spanish IV
  - AP Spanish Literature
- Ukrainian
  - Introduction to Ukrainian
  - Ukrainian I
  - Ukrainian II
  - Ukrainian III
  - Ukrainian IV

=== Music Department ===
- Classical Piano
- Piano Class for Madrigals
- Guitar I
- Instrumental Ensemble
- Madrigals
- Theory I
- Theory II
- Choral Music
- Music Appreciation
- American Music
- AP Music Theory
- Glee Club
- Ukrainian Singers
- Handbells

=== Health and Physical Education Department ===
- Phys. Ed I
- Phys. Ed II
- Phys. Ed III
- Phys. Ed. IV
- Health

=== Science Department ===
- Geological and Atmospheric Science
- Honors Biology
- Biology
- Honors Chemistry
- Chemistry
- Environmental Science
- Human Anatomy and Physiology
- Honors Physics
- General Physics

=== Religious Studies Department ===
- Religion I - The Christian Faith
- Religion II - Jesus the Christ
- Religion II - Prayer & Sacraments
- Religion III - The Church
- Christian Morality
- Religion IV - Hebrew Scripture
- Religion IV - Love & Relationships
- Death and Dying
- Peace Through Justice
- Dating and Sexuality

=== Social Studies Department ===
- World Cultures
- Honors Modern European History
- United States History
- Advanced Placement United States History
- United States Government
- Practical Law
- AP United States Government and Politics
- Psychology and Sociology
- History in Film
- Culture, Race, and Ethnicity in America

== List of principals ==
- Gwenda Coté (2012–2017)
- Connie D'Angelo (2017—2021)
- Sr. Carla Hernández, OSBM (1986–2012)

== Notable alumni ==
- Sister Emellia Prokopik, a nun of the Catholic Church in Ukraine and the Superior General of her congregation for 12 years.
