= 2016–17 Michigan State Spartans women's basketball team =

Intercollegiate basketball season

2016–17 Michigan State Spartans women's basketball

NCAA tournament, first round
- Conference: Big Ten Conference
- Record: 21–12 (9–7 Big Ten)
- Head coach: Suzy Merchant (10th season)
- Assistant coaches: Amaka Agugua; Mark Simons; Alysiah Bond
- Home arena: Breslin Center

2016–17 Big Ten women's basketball standings
	Conf.				Overall
Team	W		L	PCT	W		L	PCT
No. 4 Maryland^{†}	15	–	1	.938	32	–	3	.914
No. 11 Ohio State*	15	–	1	.938	28	–	7	.800
Michigan	11	–	5	.688	28	–	9	.757
Indiana	10	–	6	.625	23	–	11	.676
Purdue	10	–	6	.625	23	–	13	.639
Michigan State	9	–	7	.563	21	–	12	.636
Penn State	9	–	7	.563	21	–	11	.656
Northwestern	8	–	8	.500	20	–	11	.645
Iowa	8	–	8	.500	20	–	14	.588
Minnesota	5	–	11	.313	15	–	16	.484
Illinois	3	–	13	.188	9	–	22	.290
Wisconsin	3	–	13	.188	9	–	22	.290
Nebraska	3	–	13	.188	7	–	22	.241
Rutgers	3	–	13	.188	6	–	24	.200
† 2017 Big Ten tournament winner * Tournament #1 seed Rankings from AP poll

The 2016–17 Michigan State Spartans women's basketball team represented Michigan State University during the 2016–17 NCAA Division I women's basketball season. The Spartans, led by tenth-year head coach Suzy Merchant, played their home games at the Breslin Center in East Lansing, Michigan and were members of the Big Ten Conference. They finished the season 21–12, 9–7 in Big Ten play to finish in a tie for sixth place. In the Big Ten tournament, they beat Wisconsin and Michigan before losing in the semifinals to Maryland. They received an at-large bid to the NCAA tournament as a No. 8 seed where the lost in the First Round to Arizona State. Head Coach Suzy Merchant took a medical leave of absence of January 17, 2017 after fainting on the sidelines during a game against Illinois. She also missed the following game against Purdue days after fainting.

== Previous season ==
The Spartans finished the 2015–16 season 25–9, 13–5 in Big Ten play to finish in third place. They defeated Purdue and Ohio State in the Big Ten tournament before losing in the championship game to Maryland. They received an at-large bid to the NCAA tournament as a No. 4 seed. They defeated Belmont in the First Round before losing to Mississippi State in the Second Round.

== Roster ==
2016–17 Michigan State Spartans women's basketball team
Players
Coaches

Pos.	#	Name	Height	Year	Previous school	Hometown
G	0	Shay Colley	5 ft 8 in (1.73 m)	RS Fr	St. Edmund Campion Secondary; South Carolina	Brampton, ON
G	1	Tori Jankoska	5 ft 8 in (1.73 m)	Sr	Freeland	Freeland, MI
F	2	Mardrekia Cook	6 ft 0 in (1.83 m)	Fr	Muskegon	Muskegon, MI
G	3	Kalabryah Gondrezick	5 ft 8 in (1.73 m)	RS Fr	Benton Harbor	Benton Harbor, MI
G	4	Taryn McCutcheon	5 ft 5 in (1.65 m)	Fr	East Lansing	East Lansing, MI
G	10	Brannadais Agee	5 ft 11 in (1.8 m)	RS Sr	Cass Technical	Detroit, MI
F	11	Nathy Dambo	6 ft 3 in (1.91 m)	RS Fr	Junípero Serra	Fort-de-France, Martinique
F	12	Nia Hollie	6 ft 0 in (1.83 m)	Fr	Hopkins	Minnetonka, MN
G	13	Morgan Green	5 ft 8 in (1.73 m)	Jr	Pacific Collegiate; Chabot College	San Jose, CA
F	15	Victoria Gaines	6 ft 1 in (1.85 m)	RS Fr	Merrillville	Merrillville, IN
C	21	Hana Vesela	6 ft 4 in (1.93 m)	So	Brimley	Příbor, Czech Republic
G	22	Kiara Carter	5 ft 1 in (1.55 m)	Jr	Homewood Flossmoor	Homewood, IL
G/F	24	Lexi Gussert	6 ft 0 in (1.83 m)	Jr	Forest Park	Crystal Falls, MI
F	32	Taya Reimer	6 ft 4 in (1.93 m)	RS Jr	Hamilton Southeastern; Notre Dame	Fishers, IN
C	33	Jenna Allen	6 ft 3 in (1.91 m)	So	North Lawrence	Bedford, IN
F	55	Kennedy Johnson	6 ft 2 in (1.88 m)	Jr	Wildwood Catholic	Galloway, NJ

Head coach

- Suzy Merchant (Central Michigan)

Assistant coach(es)

- Amaka Agugua (Hofstra)
- Mark Simons (Michigan State)
- Alysiah Bond (Ohio State)

Legend

- (C) Team captain
- (S) Suspended
- (I) Ineligible
- (W) Walk-on
- Injured
- Current redshirt

Roster

== Schedule and results ==
Date time, TV	Rank^{#}	Opponent^{#}	Result	Record	Site (attendance) city, state
Exhibition
11/06/2016*; 2:00 pm		Northwood	W 82–47		Breslin Center (4,304); East Lansing, MI
Non-conference regular season
11/11/2016*; 7:00 pm		Davidson	W 70–34	1–0	Breslin Center (3,640); East Lansing, MI
11/13/2016*; 2:00 pm		Wyoming	W 63–51	2–0	Breslin Center (4,138); East Lansing, MI
11/15/2016*; 7:00 pm		Southern	W 70–55	3–0	Breslin Center (4,027); East Lansing, MI
11/18/2016*; 7:00 pm, ESPN3		at Western Michigan	W 68–64 ^{OT}	4–0	University Arena (1,788); Kalamazoo, MI
11/22/2016*; 11:00 pm, P12N	No. 24	at Oregon	L 55–88	4–1	Matthew Knight Arena (2,056); Eugene, OR
11/25/2016*; 8:00 pm	No. 24	vs. Delaware; Radisson Thanksgiving Classic	W 81–64	5–1	Matadome (218); Northridge, CA
11/26/2016*; 7:00 pm	No. 24	at Cal State Northridge; Radisson Thanksgiving Classic	W 63–59	6–1	Matadome (399); Northridge, CA
11/30/2016*; 7:00 pm		at No. 20 Syracuse; ACC–Big Ten Women's Challenge	L 64–75	6–2	Carrier Dome (768); Syracuse, NY
12/02/2016*; 7:00 pm		Oakland	W 81–76	7–2	Breslin Center (4,638); East Lansing, MI
12/06/2016*; 7:00 pm		at Quinnipiac	W 71–54	8–2	TD Bank Sports Center (1,293); Hamden, CT
12/08/2016*; 7:00 pm		at Rhode Island	W 85–48	9–2	Ryan Center (205); Kingston, RI
12/18/2016*; 12:00 pm		Northeastern	W 78–44	10–2	Breslin Center (4,018); East Lansing, MI
12/20/2016*; 7:00 pm, BTN		No. 2 Notre Dame	L 61–79	10–3	Breslin Center (7,924); East Lansing, MI
Big Ten regular season
01/01/2017; 3:00 pm		Illinois	W 71–47	11–3 (1–0)	Breslin Center (5,757); East Lansing, MI
01/04/2017; 6:00 pm		at Purdue	L 54–66	11–4 (1–1)	Mackey Arena (5,776); West Lafayette, IN
01/07/2017; 7:00 pm		Nebraska	W 93–73	12–4 (2–1)	Breslin Center (6,155); East Lansing, MI
01/10/2017; 8:00 pm, BTN		No. 11 Ohio State	W 94–75	13–4 (3–1)	Breslin Center (5,538); East Lansing, MI
01/14/2017; 12:00 pm, BTN		at Rutgers	L 58–62	13–5 (3–2)	Louis Brown Athletic Center (2,646); Piscataway, NJ
01/17/2017; 9:00 pm, BTN		at Northwestern	L 65–76	13–6 (3–3)	Welsh-Ryan Arena (783); Evanston, IL
01/22/2017; 5:00 pm, BTN		Purdue	L 66–76	13–7 (3–4)	Breslin Center (9,808); East Lansing, MI
01/25/2017; 8:00 pm		at Wisconsin	W 81–57	14–7 (4–4)	Kohl Center (3,085); Madison, WI
01/30/2017; 8:00 pm, BTN		at Minnesota	W 93–74	15–7 (5–4)	Williams Arena (3,490); Minneapolis, MN
02/02/2017; 6:00 pm, BTN		Indiana	W 69–60	16–7 (6–4)	Breslin Center (6,438); East Lansing, MI
02/09/2017; 7:00 pm, BTN		at Iowa	L 83–87 ^{OT}	16–8 (6–5)	Carver–Hawkeye Arena (4,384); Iowa City, IA
02/12/2017; 2:00 pm, ESPN2		No. 3 Maryland	L 72–89	16–9 (6–6)	Breslin Center (10,646); East Lansing, MI
02/16/2017; 7:00 pm		Minnesota	W 85–69	17–9 (7–6)	Breslin Center (5,387); East Lansing, MI
02/19/2017; 2:00 pm, BTN		at No. 20 Michigan	W 86–68	18–9 (8–6)	Crisler Center (12,707); Ann Arbor, MI
02/22/2017; 7:00 pm		Penn State	W 73–64	19–9 (9–6)	Breslin Center (6,038); East Lansing, MI
02/26/2017; 2:00 pm		at Nebraska	L 74–76 ^{OT}	19–10 (9–7)	Pinnacle Bank Arena (4,630); Lincoln, NE
Big Ten tournament
03/02/2017; 9:00 pm, BTN	(6)	vs. (11) Wisconsin; Second Round	W 70–63	20–10	Bankers Life Fieldhouse (3,431); Indianapolis, IN
03/03/2017; 9:00 pm, BTN	(6)	vs. (3) Michigan; Quarterfinals	W 74–64	21–10	Bankers Life Fieldhouse (4,065); Indianapolis, IN
03/04/2017; 6:30 pm, BTN	(6)	vs. (2) No. 4 Maryland; Semifinals	L 89–100	21–11	Bankers Life Fieldhouse (5,408); Indianapolis, IN
NCAA tournament
03/17/2017*; 7:30 pm, ESPN2	(9 S)	vs. (8 S) Arizona State; First Round	L 61–73	21–12	Colonial Life Arena (8,215); Columbia, SC
*Non-conference game. ^{#}Rankings from AP Poll. (#) Tournament seedings in parentheses. S=Stockton Region Source. All times are in Eastern Time.

== Rankings ==
Regular season polls
Poll	Pre- Season	Week 2	Week 3	Week 4	Week 5	Week 6	Week 7	Week 8	Week 9	Week 10	Week 11	Week 12	Week 13	Week 14	Week 15	Week 16	Week 17	Week 18	Week 19	Final
AP	RV	RV	24	RV	RV	RV	NR	NR	NR	NR	NR	NR	NR	NR	NR	NR	NR	NR	NR	N/A
Coaches	22	21	19	22	RV	RV	RV	RV	RV	RV	RV	NR	NR	NR	NR	NR	NR	NR	NR	NR

Legend
	Increase in ranking
	Decrease in ranking
	Not ranked previous week
(RV)	Received Votes

== See also ==
2016–17 Michigan State Spartans men's basketball team
