= 2016–17 Penn State Lady Lions basketball team =

Intercollegiate basketball season

2016–17 Penn State Lady Lions basketball

WNIT, Third Round
- Conference: Big Ten Conference
- Record: 21–11 (9–7 Big Ten)
- Head coach: Coquese Washington (10th season)
- Assistant coaches: Itoro Coleman; Tamika Williams-Jeter; Jocelyn Wyatt
- Home arena: Bryce Jordan Center

2016–17 Big Ten women's basketball standings
	Conf.				Overall
Team	W		L	PCT	W		L	PCT
No. 4 Maryland^{†}	15	–	1	.938	32	–	3	.914
No. 11 Ohio State*	15	–	1	.938	28	–	7	.800
Michigan	11	–	5	.688	28	–	9	.757
Indiana	10	–	6	.625	23	–	11	.676
Purdue	10	–	6	.625	23	–	13	.639
Michigan State	9	–	7	.563	21	–	12	.636
Penn State	9	–	7	.563	21	–	11	.656
Northwestern	8	–	8	.500	20	–	11	.645
Iowa	8	–	8	.500	20	–	14	.588
Minnesota	5	–	11	.313	15	–	16	.484
Illinois	3	–	13	.188	9	–	22	.290
Wisconsin	3	–	13	.188	9	–	22	.290
Nebraska	3	–	13	.188	7	–	22	.241
Rutgers	3	–	13	.188	6	–	24	.200
† 2017 Big Ten tournament winner * Tournament #1 seed Rankings from AP poll

The 2016–17 Penn State Lady Lions basketball team represented Pennsylvania State University during the 2016–17 NCAA Division I women's basketball season. The Lady Lions, led by 10th-year head coach Coquese Washington, played their home games at the Bryce Jordan Center as members of the Big Ten Conference. They finished the season of 21–11, 9–7 in Big Ten play to finish in a tie for sixth place. They lost in the second round of the Big Ten women's tournament to Minnesota. They were invited to the Women's National Invitation Tournament where they defeated Ohio and Fordham before losing to Virginia Tech in the third round.

== Roster ==
2016–17 Penn State Nittany Lions women's basketball team
Players
Coaches

Pos.	#	Name	Height	Year	Previous school	Hometown
G	2	Amari Carter	5 ft 8 in (1.73 m)	RS Fr	St. John's College	Washington, D.C.
G	4	Siyeh Frazier	5 ft 9 in (1.75 m)	Fr	Renaissance	Detroit, MI
G	5	Sierra Moore	5 ft 11 in (1.8 m)	RS Sr	Delone Catholic; Duke	Hanover, PA
G	10	Keke Sevillian	5 ft 7 in (1.7 m)	Sr	Goodrich	Goodrich, MI
G	11	Teniya Page	5 ft 7 in (1.7 m)	So	Marian Catholic	Chicago, IL
G	12	Lindsey Spann	5 ft 6 in (1.68 m)	RS Jr	Good Counsel	Laurel, MD
F	15	Kaliyah Mitchell	6 ft 2 in (1.88 m)	Sr	Stephenson	Stone Mountain, GA
G	22	Leah Knizner	5 ft 9 in (1.75 m)	So	Hempfield Area	Greensburg, PA
F	23	Jaylen Williams	6 ft 3 in (1.91 m)	So	Archbishop Williams	Easton, MA
C	24	Ashanti Thomas	6 ft 4 in (1.93 m)	So	Lafayette	Lexington, KY
G/F	25	Peyton Whitted	6 ft 3 in (1.91 m)	Sr	North Gwinnett	Suwanee, GA
G	31	Jaida Travascio-Green	6 ft 2 in (1.88 m)	Fr	Downers Grove North	Lisle, IL
G	34	Sarah McMurtry	5 ft 6 in (1.68 m)	So	Upper St. Clair	Pittsburgh, PA
F	35	De'Janae Boykin (I) (redshirt)	6 ft 2 in (1.88 m)	So	Charles Herbert Flowers; Connecticut	Springdale, MD

Head coach

- Coquese Washington (Notre Dame)

Assistant coach(es)

- Itoro Coleman (Clemson)
- Tamika Williams-Jeter (Connecticut)
- Jocelyn Wyatt (Appalachian State)

Legend

- (C) Team captain
- (S) Suspended
- (I) Ineligible
- (W) Walk-on
- Injured
- Current redshirt

Roster

== Schedule ==
Date time, TV	Rank^{#}	Opponent^{#}	Result	Record	Site (attendance) city, state
Exhibition
10/30/2016*; 2:00 pm		Bloomsburg	W 85–41		Bryce Jordan Center; University Park, PA
Non-conference regular season
11/11/2016*; 7:00 pm		at Drexel	L 60–83	0–1	Daskalakis Athletic Center (1,057); Philadelphia, PA
11/13/2016*; 1:00 pm		Saint Peter's	W 106–50	1–1	Bryce Jordan Center (2,606); University Park, PA
11/16/2016*; 7:00 pm		Akron	W 84–71	2–1	Bryce Jordan Center (2,410); University Park, PA
11/20/2016*; 5:00 pm, BTN		No. 13 Tennessee	W 70–57	3–1	Bryce Jordan Center (3,754); University Park, PA
11/24/2016*; 3:30 pm		vs. Georgia State; San Juan Shootout	W 69–42	4–1	Ocean Center; Daytona Beach, FL
11/25/2016*; 1:15 pm		vs. Georgetown; San Juan Shootout	L 54–68	4–2	Ocean Center; Daytona Beach, FL
11/30/2016*; 7:00 pm		at Boston College; ACC–Big Ten Women's Challenge	W 60–56	5–2	Conte Forum (531); Chestnut Hill, MA
12/03/2016*; 1:00 pm		Marshall	W 82–80	6–2	Bryce Jordan Center (2,606); University Park, PA
12/07/2016*; 7:00 pm		at Holy Cross	W 84–48	7–2	Hart Center (877); Worcester, MA
12/10/2016*; 2:00 pm		Pittsburgh	W 91–62	8–2	Bryce Jordan Center (2,522); University Park, PA
12/18/2016*; 2:00 pm		American	W 70–65	9–2	Bryce Jordan Center (2,515); University Park, PA
12/21/2016*; 7:00 pm		Iona	W 80–67	10–2	Bryce Jordan Center (2,409); University Park, PA
Big Ten regular season
12/28/2016; 7:00 pm		Indiana	L 70–89	10–3 (0–1)	Bryce Jordan Center (2,736); University Park, PA
12/31/2016; 12:00 pm, BTN		at Rutgers	L 45–61	10–4 (0–2)	Louis Brown Athletic Center (2,011); Piscataway, NJ
01/03/2017; 7:00 pm, BTN		Iowa	W 71–58	11–4 (1–2)	Bryce Jordan Center (2,258); University Park, PA
01/07/2017; 2:00 pm		at Purdue	L 51–64	11–5 (1–3)	Mackey Arena (5,883); West Lafayette, IN
01/11/2017; 6:30 pm		at No. 3 Maryland	L 83–89	11–6 (1–4)	Xfinity Center (4,680); College Park, MD
01/16/2017; 7:00 pm, BTN		Wisconsin	W 76–46	12–6 (2–4)	Bryce Jordan Center (2,616); University Park, PA
01/19/2017; 7:00 pm		Nebraska	W 86–69	13–6 (3–4)	Bryce Jordan Center (2,645); University Park, PA
01/23/2017; 7:00 pm, BTN		at Indiana	L 66–72	13–7 (3–5)	Assembly Hall (2,404); Bloomington, IN
01/29/2017; 2:00 pm		Illinois	W 82–66	14–7 (4–5)	Bryce Jordan Center (3,570); University Park, PA
02/01/2017; 7:00 pm		at No. 14 Ohio State	L 72–87	14–8 (4–6)	Value City Arena (4,541); Columbus, OH
02/05/2017; 3:00 pm		at Northwestern	W 74–58	15–8 (5–6)	Welsh-Ryan Arena (1,289); Evanston, IL
02/08/2017; 7:00 pm		Minnesota	W 77–66	16–8 (6–6)	Bryce Jordan Center (2,542); University Park, PA
02/11/2017; 2:00 pm		Purdue	W 79–73	17–8 (7–6)	Bryce Jordan Center (3,875); University Park, PA
02/14/2017; 8:00 pm		at Illinois	W 80–62	18–8 (8–6)	State Farm Center (1,288); Champaign, IL
02/22/2017; 7:00 pm		at Michigan State	L 64–73	18–9 (8–7)	Breslin Center (6,038); East Lansing, MI
02/26/2017; 2:00 pm, BTN		No. 25 Michigan	W 76–75	19–9 (9–7)	Bryce Jordan Center (8,213); University Park, PA
Big Ten Women's Tournament
03/02/2017; 6:30 pm, BTN	(7)	vs. (10) Minnesota; Second Round	L 64–70	19–10	Bankers Life Fieldhouse; Indianapolis, IN
WNIT
03/17/2017*; 7:00 pm		Ohio; First Round	W 74–65	20–10	Bryce Jordan Center (1,027); University Park, PA
03/19/2017*; 2:00 pm		Fordham; Second Round	W 70–51	21–10	Bryce Jordan Center (1,127); University Park, PA
03/23/2017*; 7:00 pm		Virginia Tech; Third Round	L 55–64	21–11	Bryce Jordan Center (1,310); University Park, PA
*Non-conference game. ^{#}Rankings from AP Poll. (#) Tournament seedings in parentheses. All times are in Eastern Time.

== Rankings ==
Regular season polls
Poll	Pre- Season	Week 2	Week 3	Week 4	Week 5	Week 6	Week 7	Week 8	Week 9	Week 10	Week 11	Week 12	Week 13	Week 14	Week 15	Week 16	Week 17	Week 18	Week 19	Final
AP	NR	NR	NR	NR	NR	NR	NR	NR	NR	NR	NR	NR	NR	NR	NR	NR	NR	NR	NR	N/A
Coaches	NR	NR	RV	NR	NR	RV	NR	RV	NR	NR	NR	NR	NR	NR	NR	NR	NR	NR	NR	NR

Legend
	Increase in ranking
	Decrease in ranking
	Not ranked previous week
(RV)	Received Votes

== See also ==
- 2016–17 Penn State Nittany Lions basketball team
