= 2016–17 Nebraska Cornhuskers women's basketball team =

Intercollegiate basketball season

2016–17 Nebraska Cornhuskers women's basketball
- Conference: Big Ten Conference
- Record: 7–22 (3–13 Big Ten)
- Head coach: Amy Williams (1st season)
- Assistant coaches: Tom Goehle; Chuck Love; Tandem Mays
- Home arena: Pinnacle Bank Arena

2016–17 Big Ten women's basketball standings
	Conf.				Overall
Team	W		L	PCT	W		L	PCT
No. 4 Maryland^{†}	15	–	1	.938	32	–	3	.914
No. 11 Ohio State*	15	–	1	.938	28	–	7	.800
Michigan	11	–	5	.688	28	–	9	.757
Indiana	10	–	6	.625	23	–	11	.676
Purdue	10	–	6	.625	23	–	13	.639
Michigan State	9	–	7	.563	21	–	12	.636
Penn State	9	–	7	.563	21	–	11	.656
Northwestern	8	–	8	.500	20	–	11	.645
Iowa	8	–	8	.500	20	–	14	.588
Minnesota	5	–	11	.313	15	–	16	.484
Illinois	3	–	13	.188	9	–	22	.290
Wisconsin	3	–	13	.188	9	–	22	.290
Nebraska	3	–	13	.188	7	–	22	.241
Rutgers	3	–	13	.188	6	–	24	.200
† 2017 Big Ten tournament winner * Tournament #1 seed Rankings from AP poll

The 2016–17 Nebraska Cornhuskers women's basketball team represented University of Nebraska–Lincoln during the 2016–17 NCAA Division I women's basketball season. The Cornhuskers, led by 1st year head coach Amy Williams, played their home games at Pinnacle Bank Arena and were members of the Big Ten Conference. They finished the season 7–22, 3–13 in Big Ten play to finish in a 4 way for eleventh place. They lost in the first round of the Big Ten women's tournament to Illinois.

== Roster ==
2016–17 Nebraska Cornhuskers women's basketball team
Players
Coaches

Pos.	#	Name	Height	Year	Previous school	Hometown
G	2	Rylie Cascio Jensen	5 ft 10 in (1.78 m)	Fr	Fremont	Fremont, NE
G	3	Hannah Whitish	5 ft 9 in (1.75 m)	Fr	Barneveld	Barneveld, WI
G	5	Nicea Eliely	6 ft 1 in (1.85 m)	Fr	Rampart	Colorado Springs, CO
G	11	Esther Ramacieri	5 ft 8 in (1.73 m)	Sr	Dawson College; Felix Leclerc	Repentigny, QE, CAN
G	12	Emily Wood	5 ft 5 in (1.65 m)	Jr	Salina Central	Salina, KS
G/F	14	Grace Mitchell	6 ft 2 in (1.88 m)	Fr	Wellington	Wellington, KS
F	22	Allie Havers	6 ft 5 in (1.96 m)	Sr	Mattawan	Paw Paw, MI
G	24	Maddie Simon	6 ft 2 in (1.88 m)	So	Pius X	Lincoln, NE
F	32	Jessica Shepard	6 ft 4 in (1.93 m)	So	Fremont	Fremont, NE
G	34	Jasmine Cincore	5 ft 8 in (1.73 m)	Jr	Briarcrest Christian School	Arlington, TN
F	43	Rachel Blackburn	6 ft 3 in (1.91 m)	So	Leavenworth	Leavenworth, KS
C	50	Darrien Washington	6 ft 2 in (1.88 m)	RS So	Skyline	Oakland, CA

Head coach

- Amy Williams (Nebraska)

Assistant coach(es)

- Tom Goehle (Augustana (SD))
- Chuck Love (Northwestern Oklahoma State)
- Tandem Mays (Tulsa)

Legend

- (C) Team captain
- (S) Suspended
- (I) Ineligible
- (W) Walk-on
- Injured
- Current redshirt

Roster

== Schedule ==
Date time, TV	Rank^{#}	Opponent^{#}	Result	Record	Site (attendance) city, state
Exhibition
11/06/2016*; 2:00 pm		Southwest Baptist	W 73–71		Pinnacle Bank Arena; Lincoln, NE
Non-conference regular season
11/12/2016*; 1:00 pm		Texas–Rio Grande Valley; Preseason WNIT First Round	W 71–53	1–0	Pinnacle Bank Arena (4,405); Lincoln, NE
11/14/2016*; 7:00 pm		No. 25 Missouri; Preseason WNIT quarterfinals	L 35–55	1–1	Pinnacle Bank Arena (4,207); Lincoln, NE
11/17/2016*; 7:00 pm		Colorado State; Preseason WNIT consolation round	W 62–59	2–1	Pinnacle Bank Arena (4,229); Lincoln, NE
11/22/2016*; 7:00 pm		Nebraska–Omaha	W 66–58	3–1	Pinnacle Bank Arena (4,419); Lincoln, NE
11/25/2016*; 8:00 pm		vs. Washington State; South Point Thanksgiving Shootout	L 65–79	3–2	South Point Arena (400); Enterprise, NV
11/26/2016*; 8:00 pm		vs. Virginia; South Point Thanksgiving Shootout	L 51–73	3–3	South Point Arena (400); Enterprise, NV
12/01/2016*; 6:00 pm		at Virginia Tech; ACC–Big Ten Women's Challenge	L 67–76	3–4	Cassell Coliseum (2,292); Blacksburg, VA
12/04/2016*; 3:00 pm, BTN		California	L 65–86	3–5	Pinnacle Bank Arena (5,573); Lincoln, NE
12/06/2016*; 7:00 pm		Drake	L 70–84	3–6	Pinnacle Bank Arena (4,200); Lincoln, NE
12/09/2016*; 7:00 pm		San Jose State	W 83–61	4–6	Pinnacle Bank Arena (4,205); Lincoln, NE
12/18/2016*; 2:00 pm		at Creighton	L 64–80	4–7	D. J. Sokol Arena (1,160); Omaha, NE
12/21/2016*; 7:00 pm, BTN		No. 1 Connecticut	L 41–84	4–8	Pinnacle Bank Arena (7,553); Lincoln, NE
Big Ten regular season
12/28/2016; 7:00 pm		Northwestern	L 58–62	4–9 (0–1)	Pinnacle Bank Arena (4,669); Lincoln, NE
12/31/2016; 2:00 pm		at Iowa	L 72–75	4–10 (0–2)	Carver–Hawkeye Arena (6,750); Iowa City, IA
01/04/2017; 7:00 pm		No. 3 Maryland	L 49–93	4–11 (0–3)	Pinnacle Bank Arena (4,299); Lincoln, NE
01/07/2017; 6:00 pm		at Michigan State	L 73–93	4–12 (0–4)	Breslin Center (6,155); East Lansing, MI
01/10/2017; 7:00 pm		Rutgers	W 62–58	5–12 (1–4)	Pinnacle Bank Arena (4,193); Lincoln, NE
01/15/2017; 2:00 pm		at Illinois	L 59–79	5–13 (1–5)	State Farm Center (2,675); Champaign, IL
01/19/2017; 6:00 pm		at Penn State	L 69–86	5–14 (1–6)	Bryce Jordan Center (2,645); University Park, PA
01/22/2017; 2:00 pm		Michigan	L 51–84	5–15 (1–7)	Pinnacle Bank Arena (4,763); Lincoln, NE
01/26/2017; 5:00 pm, BTN		at Purdue	L 45–88	5–16 (1–8)	Mackey Arena (5,594); West Lafayette, IN
01/29/2017; 11:00 am, BTN		at No. 15 Ohio State	L 75–95	5–17 (1–9)	Value City Arena (6,457); Columbus, OH
02/04/2017; 5:00 pm, BTN		Minnesota	L 69–79 ^{OT}	5–18 (1–10)	Pinnacle Bank Arena (4,793); Lincoln, NE
02/09/2017; 7:00 pm		at Wisconsin	L 56–82	5–19 (1–11)	Kohl Center (4,073); Madison, WI
02/16/2017; 7:00 pm		No. 12 Ohio State	L 69–87	5–20 (1–12)	Pinnacle Bank Arena (4,278); Lincoln, NE
02/19/2017; 2:00 pm		Indiana	W 67–64	6–20 (2–12)	Pinnacle Bank Arena (4,981); Lincoln, NE
02/23/2017; 6:00 pm		at No. 25 Michigan	L 60–80	6–21 (2–13)	Crisler Center (2,276); Ann Arbor, MI
02/26/2017; 1:00 pm		Michigan State	W 76–74 ^{OT}	7–21 (3–13)	Pinnacle Bank Arena (4,630); Lincoln, NE
Big Ten Women's Tournament
03/01/2017; 12:30 pm, BTN	(13)	vs. (12) Illinois; First Round	L 70–79	7–22	Bankers Life Fieldhouse (4,830); Indianapolis, IN
*Non-conference game. ^{#}Rankings from AP Poll. (#) Tournament seedings in parentheses. All times are in Central Time.

== Rankings ==
2016–17 NCAA Division I women's basketball rankings

Regular season polls
Poll	Pre- Season	Week 2	Week 3	Week 4	Week 5	Week 6	Week 7	Week 8	Week 9	Week 10	Week 11	Week 12	Week 13	Week 14	Week 15	Week 16	Week 17	Week 18	Final
AP																			
Coaches																			

Legend
	Increase in ranking
	Decrease in ranking
	Not ranked previous week
(RV)	Received Votes
