= 2016–17 Minnesota Golden Gophers women's basketball team =

Intercollegiate basketball season

2016–17 Minnesota Golden Gophers women's basketball
- Conference: Big Ten Conference
- Record: 15–16 (5–11 Big Ten)
- Head coach: Marlene Stollings (3rd season)
- Assistant coaches: Nikita Lowry Dawkins; Tamisha Augustin; Gail Striegler
- Home arena: Williams Arena

2016–17 Big Ten women's basketball standings
	Conf.				Overall
Team	W		L	PCT	W		L	PCT
No. 4 Maryland^{†}	15	–	1	.938	32	–	3	.914
No. 11 Ohio State*	15	–	1	.938	28	–	7	.800
Michigan	11	–	5	.688	28	–	9	.757
Indiana	10	–	6	.625	23	–	11	.676
Purdue	10	–	6	.625	23	–	13	.639
Michigan State	9	–	7	.563	21	–	12	.636
Penn State	9	–	7	.563	21	–	11	.656
Northwestern	8	–	8	.500	20	–	11	.645
Iowa	8	–	8	.500	20	–	14	.588
Minnesota	5	–	11	.313	15	–	16	.484
Illinois	3	–	13	.188	9	–	22	.290
Wisconsin	3	–	13	.188	9	–	22	.290
Nebraska	3	–	13	.188	7	–	22	.241
Rutgers	3	–	13	.188	6	–	24	.200
† 2017 Big Ten tournament winner * Tournament #1 seed Rankings from AP poll

The 2016–17 Minnesota Golden Gophers women's basketball team represented the University of Minnesota during the 2016–17 NCAA Division I women's basketball season. The Golden Gophers, led by third year head coach Marlene Stollings, played their home games at Williams Arena and were members of the Big Ten Conference. They finished the season 15–16, 5–11 in Big Ten play to finish in tenth place. They advanced to the quarterfinals of the Big Ten women's tournament where they lost to Maryland.

== Roster ==
2016–17 Minnesota Golden Gophers women's basketball team
Players
Coaches

Pos.	#	Name	Height	Year	Previous school	Hometown
F	5	Taiye Bello	6 ft 2 in (1.88 m)	Fr	Southfield-Lathrup	Southfield, MI
C	10	Jessie Edwards	6 ft 3 in (1.91 m)	Jr	Western Australia	Leeming, Australia
G	12	Sue Key	5 ft 9 in (1.75 m)	Jr	Dubach; Chipola College	Dubach, LA
C	14	Bryanna Fernstrom (I) (redshirt)	6 ft 5 in (1.96 m)	Jr	Chisago Lakes; Iowa State	Center City, MN
G	15	Allina Starr	5 ft 10 in (1.78 m)	Sr	DeLaSalle HS; Auburn	Minneapolis, MN
F	20	Kehinde Bello	6 ft 2 in (1.88 m)	Fr	Southfield-Lathrup	Southfield, MI
G	21	Jasmine Brunson	5 ft 7 in (1.7 m)	Fr	Mary Louis Academy	Queens, NY
G	22	Joanna Hedstrom	6 ft 1 in (1.85 m)	RS Sr	Minnetonka	Minnetonka, MN
G	23	Kenisha Bell	5 ft 8 in (1.73 m)	RS So	Kennedy HS; Marquettte	Minneapolis, MN
F	25	Palma Kaposi	6 ft 1 in (1.85 m)	So	None	Pécs, Hungary
G	30	Whitney Tinjum	6 ft 1 in (1.85 m)	RS Sr	Chisago Lakes; Bradley	Stacy, MN
C	32	Karley Barnes	6 ft 3 in (1.91 m)	Sr	Vincent HS; Tallahassee CC	Milwaukee, WI
G	33	Carlie Wagner	5 ft 10 in (1.78 m)	Jr	NRHEG HS	New Richland, MN
G	34	Gadiva Hubbard	5 ft 10 in (1.78 m)	Fr	Princess Anne	Virginia Beach, VA
C	41	Annalese Lamke	6 ft 3 in (1.91 m)	So	Gale-Ettrick-Trempealeau HS	Milwaukee, WI

Head coach

- Marlene Stollings (Ohio)

Assistant coach(es)

- Nikita Lowry Dawkins (Ohio State)
- Tamisha Augustin (Alabama A&M)
- Gail Striegler (Central Arkansas)

Legend

- (C) Team captain
- (S) Suspended
- (I) Ineligible
- (W) Walk-on
- Injured
- Current redshirt

Roster

== Schedule and results ==
Date time, TV	Rank^{#}	Opponent^{#}	Result	Record	Site (attendance) city, state
Non conference regular season
November 12, 2016*; 2:00 pm		Harvard	W 103–87	1–0	Williams Arena (3,056); Minneapolis, MN
November 15, 2016*; 5:00 pm		at VCU	W 79–69	2–0	Siegel Center (943); Richmond, VA
November 18, 2016*; 4:00 pm		Georgetown	W 68–60	3–0	Williams Arena (3,011); Minneapolis, MN
November 20, 2016*; 2:00 pm		Seton Hall	W 90–57	4–0	Williams Arena (3,022); Minneapolis, MN
November 24, 2016*; 1:00 pm		vs. Georgia; Junkanoo Jam Lucaya Division semifinals	L 58–70	4–1	St. George HS Gymnasium (229); Freeport, BAH
November 25, 2016*; 4:45 pm		vs. North Carolina; Junkanoo Jam Lucaya Division 3rd place game	L 77–91	4–2	St. George HS Gymnasium (486); Freeport, BAH
November 30, 2016*; 6:00 pm, BTN		No. 8 Florida State; ACC–Big Ten Women's Challenge	L 61–75	4–3	Williams Arena (2,213); Minneapolis, MN
December 3, 2016*; 2:00 pm		Detroit	W 111–91	5–3	Williams Arena (2,256); Minneapolis, MN
December 6, 2016*; 8:00 pm		at New Mexico	W 69–65	6–3	The Pit (4,387); Albuquerque, NM
December 8, 2016*; 8:00 pm, BTN		Army	W 70–52	7–3	Williams Arena (2,003); Minneapolis, MN
December 11, 2016*; 2:00 pm, SECN		at No. 6 South Carolina	L 58–98	7–4	Colonial Life Arena (12,461); Columbia, SC
December 14, 2016*; 12:00 pm		Belmont	W 75–74	8–4	Williams Arena (3,342); Minneapolis, MN
December 22, 2016*; 7:00 pm		Kent State	W 92–62	9–4	Williams Arena (2,389); Minneapolis, MN
Big Ten regular season
December 28, 2016; 6:00 pm		at No. 14 Ohio State	L 62–87	9–5 (0–1)	Value City Arena (7,105); Columbus, OH
January 1, 2017; 5:00 pm		No. 4 Maryland	L 72–83	9–6 (0–2)	Williams Arena (4,884); Minneapolis, MN
January 4, 2017; 6:00 pm		at Indiana	L 62–78	9–7 (0–3)	Simon Skjodt Assembly Hall (2,409); Bloomington, IN
January 7, 2017; 5:00 pm		Wisconsin	W 88–60	10–7 (1–3)	Williams Arena (4,471); Minneapolis, MN
January 11, 2017; 7:00 pm		Northwestern; Postponed, rescheduled for 02/13/2017			Williams Arena; Minneapolis, MN
January 15, 2017; 3:30 pm, BTN		at Michigan	L 67–80	10–8 (1–4)	Crisler Center (2,482); Ann Arbor MI
January 18, 2017; 7:00 pm, BTN		Illinois	W 78–50	11–8 (2–4)	Williams Arena (2,781); Minneapolis, MN
January 21, 2017; 2:00 pm		at Iowa	L 65–80	11–9 (2–5)	Carver–Hawkeye Arena (7,191); Iowa City, IA
January 26, 2017; 7:00 pm		No. 15 Ohio State	L 76–88	11–10 (2–6)	Williams Arena (2,896); Minneapolis, MN
January 30, 2017; 7:00 pm, BTN		Michigan State	L 74–93	11–11 (2–7)	Williams Arena (3,490); Minneapolis, MN
February 4, 2017; 5:00 pm, BTN		at Nebraska	W 79–69 ^{OT}	12–11 (3–7)	Pinnacle Bank Arena (4,793); Lincoln, NE
February 8, 2017; 6:00 pm		at Penn State	L 66–77	12–12 (3–8)	Bryce Jordan Center (2,542); University Park, PA
February 11, 2017; 2:00 pm		Rutgers	W 80–46	13–12 (4–8)	Williams Arena (4,726); Minneapolis, MN
February 13, 2017; 6:00 pm		Northwestern	W 71–61	14–12 (5–8)	Williams Arena (3,764); Minneapolis, MN
February 16, 2017; 7:00 pm		at Michigan State	L 69–85	14–13 (5–9)	Breslin Center (5,387); East Lansing, MI
February 23, 2017; 8:00 pm, BTN		Purdue	L 54–67	14–14 (5–10)	Williams Arena (2,832); Minneapolis, MN
February 26, 2017; 11:00 am, BTN		at No. 2 Maryland	L 60–93	14–15 (5–11)	Xfinity Center (10,107); College Park, MD
Big Ten Women's Tournament
March 2, 2017; 5:30 pm, BTN	(10)	vs. (7) Penn State; Second Round	W 70–64	15–15	Bankers Life Fieldhouse; Indianapolis, IN
March 3, 2017; 5:30 pm, BTN	(10)	vs. (2) No. 4 Maryland; Quarterfinals	L 80–92	15–16	Bankers Life Fieldhouse; Indianapolis, IN
*Non-conference game. ^{#}Rankings from AP Poll. (#) Tournament seedings in parentheses. All times are in Central Time.

== Rankings ==
Ranking movement Legend: ██ Increase in ranking. ██ Decrease in ranking. NR = Not ranked. RV = Received votes.
Poll	Pre	Wk 2	Wk 3	Wk 4	Wk 5	Wk 6	Wk 7	Wk 8	Wk 9	Wk 10	Wk 11	Wk 12	Wk 13	Wk 14	Wk 15	Wk 16	Wk 17	Wk 18	Wk 19	Final
AP																				N/A
Coaches																				

== See also ==
- 2016–17 Minnesota Golden Gophers men's basketball team
