= 2016–17 Ohio State Buckeyes women's basketball team =

Intercollegiate basketball season

2016–17 Ohio State Buckeyes women's basketball

Big Ten regular season co-champions

NCAA Women's Tournament, Sweet Sixteen
- Conference: Big Ten Conference

Ranking
- Coaches: No. 10
- AP: No. 9
- Record: 28–7 (15–1 Big Ten)
- Head coach: Kevin McGuff (4th season)
- Assistant coaches: Patrick Klein; Mark Mitchell; Carrie Banks
- Home arena: Value City Arena

2016–17 Big Ten women's basketball standings
	Conf.				Overall
Team	W		L	PCT	W		L	PCT
No. 4 Maryland^{†}	15	–	1	.938	32	–	3	.914
No. 11 Ohio State*	15	–	1	.938	28	–	7	.800
Michigan	11	–	5	.688	28	–	9	.757
Indiana	10	–	6	.625	23	–	11	.676
Purdue	10	–	6	.625	23	–	13	.639
Michigan State	9	–	7	.563	21	–	12	.636
Penn State	9	–	7	.563	21	–	11	.656
Northwestern	8	–	8	.500	20	–	11	.645
Iowa	8	–	8	.500	20	–	14	.588
Minnesota	5	–	11	.313	15	–	16	.484
Illinois	3	–	13	.188	9	–	22	.290
Wisconsin	3	–	13	.188	9	–	22	.290
Nebraska	3	–	13	.188	7	–	22	.241
Rutgers	3	–	13	.188	6	–	24	.200
† 2017 Big Ten tournament winner * Tournament #1 seed Rankings from AP poll

The 2016–17 Ohio State Buckeyes women's basketball team represented the Ohio State University during the 2016–17 NCAA Division I women's basketball season. The Buckeyes, led by fourth-year head coach Kevin McGuff, played their home games at Value City Arena and were members of the Big Ten Conference. They finished the season 28–7, 15–1 in Big Ten play to win a share of the Big Ten regular season title with Maryland. They defeated Northwestern in the quarterfinals of the Big Ten women's basketball tournament before losing to Purdue. They received an at-large bid to the NCAA women's tournament as the No. 5 seed in the Lexington region. There, they defeated Western Kentucky and Kentucky to advance to the Sweet Sixteen. In the Sweet Sixteen, they lost to Notre Dame.

== Roster ==
2016–17 Ohio State Buckeyes women's basketball team
Players
Coaches

Pos.	#	Name	Height	Year	Previous school	Hometown
F	0	Tori McCoy	6 ft 4 in (1.93 m)	Fr	St. Thomas More	Champaign, Illinois
F	1	Stephanie Mavunga	6 ft 3 in (1.91 m)	RS Jr	Brownsburg; North Carolina	Brownsburg, IN
G	3	Kelsey Mitchell	5 ft 8 in (1.73 m)	Jr	Princeton	Cincinnati, OH
G	4	Sierra Calhoun	6 ft 0 in (1.83 m)	RS So	Christ the King; Duke	Brooklyn, NY
F	5	Chelsea Mitchell	5 ft 11 in (1.8 m)	RS So	Princeton	Cincinnati, OH
G	12	Kianna Holland	5 ft 9 in (1.75 m)	RS So	Seneca	Seneca, SC
G	15	Linnae Harper	5 ft 8 in (1.73 m)	RS Jr	Whitney Young; Kentucky	Chicago, IL
G	20	Asia Doss	5 ft 7 in (1.7 m)	Jr	Country Day School	Detroit, MI
F	22	Alexa Hart	6 ft 3 in (1.91 m)	Jr	Africentric	Columbus, OH
G	23	Kiara Lewis	5 ft 8 in (1.73 m)	Fr	Whitney Young	Chicago, IL
F	24	Makayla Waterman	6 ft 2 in (1.88 m)	RS So	Fairmont	Kettering, OH
F	32	Shayla Cooper	6 ft 2 in (1.88 m)	Sr	Norcross	Norcross, GA
G	33	Jensen Caretti	6 ft 1 in (1.85 m)	Fr	River	Clarington, OH
C	34	Theresa Ekhelar	6 ft 6 in (1.98 m)	So	Life Center Academy	Woodbridge, NJ

Head coach

- Kevin McGuff (Saint Joseph's (IN))

Assistant coach(es)

- Patrick Klein (Ohio State)
- Mark Mitchell (Eastern Kentucky)
- Carrie Banks (Detroit Mercy)

Legend

- (C) Team captain
- (S) Suspended
- (I) Ineligible
- (W) Walk-on
- Injured
- Current redshirt

Roster

== Schedule ==
Date time, TV	Rank^{#}	Opponent^{#}	Result	Record	Site (attendance) city, state
Exhibition
11/06/2016*; 1:00 pm	No. 7	Ashland	W 88–79		Value City Arena (4,831); Columbus, OH
Non-conference regular season
11/11/2016*; 12:00 pm	No. 7	Duquesne	W 89–69	1–0	St. John Arena (3,434); Columbus, OH
11/14/2016*; 6:00 pm	No. 7	No. 4 South Carolina	L 80–92	1–1	Value City Arena (6,683); Columbus, OH
11/16/2016*; 7:00 pm	No. 7	Cleveland State	W 96–78	2–1	Value City Arena (4,023); Columbus, OH
11/19/2016*; 12:00 pm	No. 7	LIU Brooklyn	W 113–54	3–1	Value City Arena (4,296); Columbus, OH
11/25/2016*; 5:00 pm	No. 8	vs. Florida Gulf Coast; Gulf Coast Showcase quarterfinals	W 79–66	4–1	Germain Arena; Estero, FL
11/26/2016*; 7:30 pm	No. 8	vs. No. 11 Syracuse; Gulf Coast Showcase semifinals	W 77–72	5–1	Germain Arena; Estero, FL
11/27/2016*; 7:30 pm	No. 8	vs. No. 5 Baylor; Gulf Coast Showcase championship	L 68–85	5–2	Germain Arena; Estero, FL
12/01/2016*; 7:00 pm, BTN	No. 9	No. 18 Miami (FL); ACC–Big Ten Women's Challenge	L 89–94 ^{OT}	5–3	Value City Arena (4,165); Columbus, OH
12/04/2016*; 2:00 pm	No. 9	Cincinnati	W 80–38	6–3	Value City Arena (5,850); Columbus, OH
12/07/2016*; 7:00 pm	No. 12	Southern	W 108–73	7–3	Value City Arena (3,973); Columbus, OH
12/11/2016*; 2:00 pm	No. 12	Canisius	W 89–56	8–3	Value City Arena (4,598); Columbus, OH
12/16/2016*; 7:00 pm	No. 12	Alabama State	W 118–61	9–3	Value City Arena (4,469); Columbus, OH
12/19/2016*; 7:00 pm, CBSSN	No. 12	at No. 1 Connecticut	L 63–82	9–4	XL Center (9,379); Hartford, CT
12/21/2016*; 7:00 pm	No. 12	Winthrop	W 88–48	10–4	Value City Arena (4,347); Columbus, OH
Big Ten regular season
12/28/2016; 7:00 pm	No. 14	Minnesota	W 87–62	11–4 (1–0)	Value City Arena (7,105); Columbus, OH
12/31/2016; 3:00 pm, CBS	No. 14	at Indiana	W 92–82	12–4 (2–0)	Simon Skjodt Assembly Hall (4,281); Bloomington, IN
01/03/2017; 9:00 pm, BTN	No. 11	at Northwestern	W 94–87	13–4 (3–0)	Welsh-Ryan Arena (971); Evanston, IL
01/07/2017; 12:00 pm, BTN	No. 11	Michigan; Rivalry	W 96–87	14–4 (4–0)	Value City Arena (6,636); Columbus, OH
01/10/2017; 8:00 pm, BTN	No. 11	at Michigan State	L 75–94	14–5 (4–1)	Breslin Center (5,538); East Lansing, MI
01/15/2017; 3:30 pm, ESPN2	No. 11	at Purdue	W 61–56	15–5 (5–1)	Mackey Arena (6,803); West Lafayette, IN
01/19/2017; 7:00 pm	No. 16	Wisconsin	W 70–61	16–5 (6–1)	Value City Arena (4,466); Columbus, OH
01/22/2017; 5:00 pm	No. 16	Illinois	W 88–64	17–5 (7–1)	Value City Arena (5,694); Columbus, OH
01/26/2016; 8:00 pm	No. 15	at Minnesota	W 88–76	18–5 (8–1)	Williams Arena (2,896); Minneapolis, MN
01/29/2017; 12:00 pm, BTN	No. 15	Nebraska	W 95–75	19–5 (9–1)	Value City Arena (6,457); Columbus, OH
02/01/2017; 7:00 pm	No. 14	Penn State	W 87–72	20–5 (10–1)	Value City Arena (4,541); Columbus, OH
02/04/2017; 2:00 pm, BTN	No. 14	at Wisconsin	W 96–68	21–5 (11–1)	Kohl Center (4,454); Madison, WI
02/12/2017; 12:00 pm, BTN	No. 13	Iowa	W 88–81	22–5 (12–1)	Value City Arena (6,679); Columbus, OH
02/16/2017; 8:00 pm	No. 12	at Nebraska	W 87–69	23–5 (13–1)	Pinnacle Bank Arena (4,278); Lincoln, NE
02/20/2017; 7:00 pm, ESPN2	No. 12	No. 2 Maryland	W 98–87	24–5 (14–1)	Value City Arena (6,505); Columbus, OH
02/26/2017; 3:00 pm, ESPN2	No. 12	at Rutgers	W 75–43	25–5 (15–1)	Louis Brown Athletic Center (3,061); Piscataway, NJ
Big Ten Women's Tournament
03/03/2017; 12:00 pm, BTN	(1) No. 9	vs. (9) Northwestern; Quarterfinals	W 99–68	26–5	Bankers Life Fieldhouse; Indianapolis, IN
03/04/2017; 3:00 pm, BTN	(1) No. 9	vs. (5) Purdue; Semifinals	L 60–71	26–6	Bankers Life Fieldhouse; Indianapolis, IN
NCAA Women's Tournament
03/17/2017*; 5:30 PM, ESPN2	(5 L) No. 11	vs. (12 L) Western Kentucky; First Round	W 70–63	27–6	Memorial Coliseum (3,557); Lexington, KY
03/19/2017*; 12:00 PM, ESPN2	(5) No. 11 L	at (4) No. 18 Kentucky; Second Round	W 82–68	28–6	Memorial Coliseum (2,644); Lexington, KY
03/24/2017*; 7:00 PM, ESPN	(5 L) No. 11	vs. (1 L) No. 2 Notre Dame; Sweet Sixteen	L 76–99	28–7	Rupp Arena (2,527); Lexington, KY
*Non-conference game. ^{#}Rankings from AP Poll. (#) Tournament seedings in parentheses. L=Lexington Region. All times are in Eastern Time.

== Rankings ==
Ranking movement Legend: ██ Increase in ranking. ██ Decrease in ranking. NR = Not ranked. RV = Received votes.
Poll	Pre	Wk 2	Wk 3	Wk 4	Wk 5	Wk 6	Wk 7	Wk 8	Wk 9	Wk 10	Wk 11	Wk 12	Wk 13	Wk 14	Wk 15	Wk 16	Wk 17	Wk 18	Wk 19	Final
AP	7	7	8	9	12	12	12	14	11	11	16	15	14	13	12	12	9	11	11	N/A
Coaches	6т	8	8	10	12	13	13	13	13	11	13	14	14	13	12	9	8	10	10	10

== See also ==
- 2016–17 Ohio State Buckeyes men's basketball team
