= 2016–17 Northwestern Wildcats women's basketball team =

Intercollegiate basketball season

2016–17 Northwestern Wildcats women's basketball
- Conference: Big Ten Conference
- Record: 20–11 (8–8 Big Ten)
- Head coach: Joe McKeown (9th season)
- Assistant coaches: Sam Dixon; Tiffany Coppage; Christie Sides
- Home arena: Welsh-Ryan Arena

2016–17 Big Ten women's basketball standings
	Conf.				Overall
Team	W		L	PCT	W		L	PCT
No. 4 Maryland^{†}	15	–	1	.938	32	–	3	.914
No. 11 Ohio State*	15	–	1	.938	28	–	7	.800
Michigan	11	–	5	.688	28	–	9	.757
Indiana	10	–	6	.625	23	–	11	.676
Purdue	10	–	6	.625	23	–	13	.639
Michigan State	9	–	7	.563	21	–	12	.636
Penn State	9	–	7	.563	21	–	11	.656
Northwestern	8	–	8	.500	20	–	11	.645
Iowa	8	–	8	.500	20	–	14	.588
Minnesota	5	–	11	.313	15	–	16	.484
Illinois	3	–	13	.188	9	–	22	.290
Wisconsin	3	–	13	.188	9	–	22	.290
Nebraska	3	–	13	.188	7	–	22	.241
Rutgers	3	–	13	.188	6	–	24	.200
† 2017 Big Ten tournament winner * Tournament #1 seed Rankings from AP poll

The 2016–17 Northwestern Wildcats women's basketball team represented Northwestern University during the 2016–17 NCAA Division I women's basketball season. The Wildcats, led by ninth-year head coach Joe McKeown, played their home games at the Welsh-Ryan Arena as members of the Big Ten Conference. They finished the season 20–11, 8–8 in Big Ten play to finish in a tie for eighth place. They defeated Iowa in the second round of the Big Ten women's tournament before losing to Ohio State. Despite having 20 wins, they were not invited to a postseason tournament first time since 2013.

== Roster ==
2016–17 Northwestern Wildcats women's basketball team
Players
Coaches

Pos.	#	Name	Height	Year	Previous school	Hometown
G	3	Ashley Deary	5 ft 4 in (1.63 m)	Sr	Flower Mound	Flower Mound, TX
F	4	Bry Hopkins	6 ft 2 in (1.88 m)	Fr	William Fremd	Palatine, IL
G	5	Jordan Hankins	5 ft 8 in (1.73 m)	So	Lawrence North	Indianapolis, IN
F	10	Nia Coffey	6 ft 1 in (1.85 m)	Sr	Hopkins	Minneapolis, MN
F	11	Lauren Douglas	6 ft 2 in (1.88 m)	RS Sr	Briarcrest Christian	Collierville, TN
G	12	Lydia Rohde	5 ft 10 in (1.78 m)	Jr	Brookfield Central	Brookfield, WI
F	14	Pallas Kunaiyi-Akpannah	6 ft 2 in (1.88 m)	So	Rabun Gap-Nacoochee School	Abuja, Nigeria
F/C	21	Abbie Wolf	6 ft 4 in (1.93 m)	Fr	Greenwich	White Plains, NY
G	22	Byrdy Galernik	5 ft 8 in (1.73 m)	Fr	Toledo Central Catholic	Perrysburg, OH
G	24	Christen Inman	5 ft 10 in (1.78 m)	Sr	Seven Lakes	Katy, TX
F/C	30	Allie Tuttle	6 ft 4 in (1.93 m)	Sr	Panther Creek	Cary, NC
C	33	Oceana Hamilton	6 ft 4 in (1.93 m)	RS Jr	St. Edmund Campion; Alabama	Mississauga, ON
F	34	Amber Jamison	6 ft 0 in (1.83 m)	So	Rochester Adams	Rochester Hills, MI
G	35	Maya Jonas	6 ft 2 in (1.88 m)	Jr	Whitefish Bay	Whitefish Bay, WI
F/C	44	Aby Scheid	6 ft 2 in (1.88 m)	Fr	Elk River	Elk River, MN

Head coach

- Joe McKeown (Mercer)

Assistant coach(es)

- Sam Dixon (Wooster)
- Tiffany Coppage (Missouri State)
- Christie Sides (Louisiana Tech)

Legend

- (C) Team captain
- (S) Suspended
- (I) Ineligible
- (W) Walk-on
- Injured
- Current redshirt

Roster

== Schedule ==
Date time, TV	Rank^{#}	Opponent^{#}	Result	Record	Site (attendance) city, state
Exhibition
11/06/2016*; 12:00 pm		Illinois–Springfield	W 84–56		Welsh-Ryan Arena (550); Evanston, IL
Non-conference regular season
11/11/2016*; 3:30 pm		Hampton	W 67–48	1–0	Welsh-Ryan Arena (747); Evanston, IL
11/13/2016*; 1:00 pm		Oral Roberts	W 64–55	2–0	Welsh-Ryan Arena (765); Evanston, IL
11/16/2016*; 7:00 pm		Missouri State	W 75–52	3–0	Welsh-Ryan Arena (651); Evanston, IL
11/19/2016*; 7:00 pm		at No. 20 DePaul	L 66–89	3–1	McGrath-Phillips Arena (2,342); Chicago, IL
11/25/2016*; 7:00 pm		No. 16 Florida	W 73–68	4–1	Welsh-Ryan Arena (857); Evanston, IL
11/27/2016*; 2:00 pm		Evansville	W 88–66	5–1	Welsh-Ryan Arena (853); Evanston, IL
12/01/2016*; 8:00 pm, BTN		Virginia; ACC–Big Ten Women's Challenge	W 69–60	6–1	Welsh-Ryan Arena (694); Evanston, IL
12/04/2016*; 1:00 pm		Chicago State	W 75–42	7–1	Welsh-Ryan Arena (886); Evanston, IL
12/11/2016*; 12:00 pm		at Milwaukee	W 65–63	8–1	Klotsche Center (364); Milwaukee, WI
12/13/2016*; 11:00 am		UIC	W 88–44	9–1	Welsh-Ryan Arena (5,447); Evanston, IL
12/17/2016*; 3:00 pm		at Santa Clara	W 87–75	10–1	Leavey Center (250); Santa Clara, CA
12/19/2016*; 8:00 pm		at Gonzaga	L 56–67	10–2	McCarthey Athletic Center (5,638); Spokane, WA
12/22/2016*; 2:00 pm		UT Martin	W 82–59	11–2	Welsh-Ryan Arena (709); Evanston, IL
Big Ten regular season
12/28/2016; 7:00 pm		at Nebraska	W 62–58	12–2 (1–0)	Pinnacle Bank Arena (4,669); Lincoln, NE
12/31/2016; 2:00 pm		Purdue	W 76–60	13–2 (2–0)	Welsh-Ryan Arena (1,205); Evanston, IL
01/03/2017; 8:00 pm, BTN		No. 11 Ohio State	L 87–94	13–3 (2–1)	Welsh-Ryan Arena (971); Evanston, IL
01/07/2017; 1:00 pm, BTN		at No. 3 Maryland	L 55–96	13–4 (2–2)	Xfinity Center (5,214); College Park, MD
01/11/2017; 7:00 pm		at Minnesota; Postponed, rescheduled for 02/13/2017			Williams Arena; Minneapolis, MN
01/14/2017; 2:00 pm		Indiana	W 80–67	14–4 (3–2)	Welsh-Ryan Arena (2,482); Evanston, IL
01/17/2017; 8:00 pm, BTN		Michigan State	W 76–65	15–4 (4–2)	Welsh-Ryan Arena (783); Evanston, IL
01/25/2017; 6:00 pm		at Michigan	L 54–80	15–5 (4–3)	Crisler Center (2,097); Ann Arbor, MI
01/29/2017; 1:00 pm		at Rutgers	W 55–37	16–5 (5–3)	Louis Brown Athletic Center (2,576); Piscataway, NJ
02/01/2017; 7:00 pm		Wisconsin	W 63–43	17–5 (6–3)	Welsh-Ryan Arena (924); Evanston, IL
02/05/2017; 2:00 pm		Penn State	L 58–74	17–6 (6–4)	Welsh-Ryan Arena (1,289); Evanston, IL
02/11/2017; 11:00 am, BTN		at Indiana	L 38–66	17–7 (6–5)	Simon Skjodt Assembly Hall (3,517); Bloomington, IN
02/13/2017; 6:00 pm		at Minnesota	L 61–71	17–8 (6–6)	Williams Arena (3,764); Minneapolis, MN
02/16/2017; 7:00 pm, BTN		at Iowa	L 59–78	17–9 (6–7)	Carver–Hawkeye Arena (4,167); Iowa City, IA
02/19/2017; 1:00 pm		Illinois	W 66–53	18–9 (7–7)	Welsh-Ryan Arena (2,233); Evanston, IL
02/23/2017; 6:00 pm, BTN		Rutgers	W 60–38	19–9 (8–7)	Welsh-Ryan Arena (1,020); Evanston, IL
02/26/2017; 3:00 pm, BTN		at Purdue	L 59–61	19–10 (8–8)	Mackey Arena (6,407); West Lafayette, IN
Big Ten Women's Tournament
03/02/2017; 11:00 am, BTN	(9)	vs. (8) Iowa; Second Round	W 78–73	20–10	Bankers Life Fieldhouse; Indianapolis, IN
03/03/2017; 11:00 am, BTN	(9)	vs. (1) No. 9 Ohio State; Quarterfinals	L 68–99	20–11	Bankers Life Fieldhouse; Indianapolis, IN
*Non-conference game. ^{#}Rankings from AP Poll. (#) Tournament seedings in parentheses. All times are in Central Time.

== Rankings ==
Regular season polls
Poll	Pre- Season	Week 2	Week 3	Week 4	Week 5	Week 6	Week 7	Week 8	Week 9	Week 10	Week 11	Week 12	Week 13	Week 14	Week 15	Week 16	Week 17	Week 18	Week 19	Final
AP	NR	NR	NR	RV	RV	RV	RV	RV	RV	NR	RV	RV	RV	NR	NR	NR	NR			N/A
Coaches	RV	NR	NR	NR	RV	RV	RV	RV	RV	RV	RV	RV	RV	RV	RV	RV	RV			

Legend
	Increase in ranking
	Decrease in ranking
	Not ranked previous week
(RV)	Received Votes

== See also ==
- 2016–17 Northwestern Wildcats men's basketball team
