= 2016–17 Rutgers Scarlet Knights women's basketball team =

Intercollegiate basketball season

2016–17 Rutgers Scarlet Knights women's basketball
- Conference: Big Ten Conference
- Record: 6–24 (3–13 Big Ten)
- Head coach: C. Vivian Stringer (22nd season)
- Assistant coaches: Timothy Eatman; Kelley Gibson; Nadine Domond
- Home arena: Louis Brown Athletic Center

2016–17 Big Ten women's basketball standings
	Conf.				Overall
Team	W		L	PCT	W		L	PCT
No. 4 Maryland^{†}	15	–	1	.938	32	–	3	.914
No. 11 Ohio State*	15	–	1	.938	28	–	7	.800
Michigan	11	–	5	.688	28	–	9	.757
Indiana	10	–	6	.625	23	–	11	.676
Purdue	10	–	6	.625	23	–	13	.639
Michigan State	9	–	7	.563	21	–	12	.636
Penn State	9	–	7	.563	21	–	11	.656
Northwestern	8	–	8	.500	20	–	11	.645
Iowa	8	–	8	.500	20	–	14	.588
Minnesota	5	–	11	.313	15	–	16	.484
Illinois	3	–	13	.188	9	–	22	.290
Wisconsin	3	–	13	.188	9	–	22	.290
Nebraska	3	–	13	.188	7	–	22	.241
Rutgers	3	–	13	.188	6	–	24	.200
† 2017 Big Ten tournament winner * Tournament #1 seed Rankings from AP poll

The 2016–17 Rutgers Scarlet Knights women's basketball team represented Rutgers University during the 2016–17 NCAA Division I women's basketball season. The Scarlet Knights, led by twenty-second year head coach C. Vivian Stringer, played their home games at the Louis Brown Athletic Center, better known as The RAC, as third year members of the Big Ten Conference. They finished the season 6–24, 3–13 in Big Ten play to finish in a 4 way for eleventh place. They lost in the first round of the Big Ten women's tournament to Wisconsin.

== Roster ==
2016–17 Rutgers Scarlet Knights women's basketball team
Players
Coaches

Pos.	#	Name	Height	Year	Previous school	Hometown
G	0	Ciani Cryor (redshirt)	5 ft 5 in (1.65 m)	So	Neumann-Goretti	Philadelphia, PA
G	1	Jazlynd Rollins	5 ft 7 in (1.7 m)	Jr	Buchholz; Daytona State	Gainesville, FL
G	3	Tyler Scaife	5 ft 9 in (1.75 m)	Sr	Hall	Little Rock, AR
G	4	Kate Hill	5 ft 7 in (1.7 m)	Fr	Peddie	Toronto, ON
F	5	Stasha Carey (redshirt)	6 ft 2 in (1.88 m)	Jr	Berea-Midpark/Pittsburgh	Cleveland, OH
G	5	Shrita Parker	5 ft 7 in (1.7 m)	Jr	Ocean Lakes	Virginia Beach, VA
G	10	Kathleen Fitzpatrick	5 ft 9 in (1.75 m)	Sr	Academy of Notre Dame de Namur/Saint Joseph's	Drexel Hill, PA
G/F	11	Ashli Jeune	6 ft 1 in (1.85 m)	RS So	Life Center Academy	Westampton, NJ
G	12	Khadaizha Sanders	5 ft 7 in (1.7 m)	So	Bishop McNamara	Virginia Beach, IL
G	13	DaChe Williams	6 ft 2 in (1.88 m)	RS Jr	Watkinson School	Bloomfield, CT
G/F	22	Kandiss Barber	5 ft 10 in (1.78 m)	Jr	Mater Dei/Southern Idaho	Chula Vista, CA
F/C	32	Desiree Keeling	6 ft 2 in (1.88 m)	So	William Fleming	Roanoke, VA
G	33	Alex Alfano	5 ft 8 in (1.73 m)	Sr	Red Bank Catholic	Atlantic Highlands, NJ
F/C	40	Victoria Harris	6 ft 3 in (1.91 m)	So	Parkview	Snellville, GA
C	44	Jordan Wallace	6 ft 3 in (1.91 m)	Fr	Sterling	Somerdale, NJ

Head coach

- C. Vivian Stringer (Slippery Rock)

Assistant coach(es)

- Tim Eatman (Talladega)
- Kelley Gibson (Maryland)
- Nadine Domond (Iowa)

Legend

- (C) Team captain
- (S) Suspended
- (I) Ineligible
- (W) Walk-on
- Injured
- Current redshirt

Roster

== Schedule ==
Date time, TV	Rank^{#}	Opponent^{#}	Result	Record	Site (attendance) city, state
Non-conference regular season
11/11/2016*; 2:00 pm		Chattanooga	L 53–66	0–1	Louis Brown Athletic Center (1,547); Piscataway, NJ
11/14/2016*; 5:30 pm		at Elon	L 54–66	0–2	Alumni Gym (983); Elon, NC
11/17/2016*; 7:00 pm		at Wake Forest	L 43–55	0–3	LJVM Coliseum (525); Winston-Salem, NC
11/20/2016*; 6:00 pm		at Virginia	L 54–62	0–4	John Paul Jones Arena (2,621); Charlottesville, VA
11/25/2016*; 2:00 pm, ESPN3		at Princeton; Rivalry	L 34–64	0–5	Jadwin Gymnasium (848); Princeton, NJ
11/27/2016*; 2:00 pm		Bryant	W 50–42	1–5	Louis Brown Athletic Center (1,691); Piscataway, NJ
12/01/2016*; 7:00 pm		Duke; ACC–Big Ten Women's Challenge	L 32–68	1–6	Louis Brown Athletic Center (2,704); Piscataway, NJ
12/03/2016*; 2:00 pm		Bucknell	W 57–53	2–6	Louis Brown Athletic Center (1,674); Piscataway, NJ
12/05/2016*; 7:00 pm		James Madison	L 76–82 ^{2OT}	2–7	Louis Brown Athletic Center (1,320); Piscataway, NJ
12/07/2016*; 7:00 pm, ESPN3		at St. John's	L 39–65	2–8	Carnesecca Arena (519); Queens, NY
12/10/2016*; 6:00 pm		at Houston	L 51–53	2–9	Hofheinz Pavilion (671); Houston, TX
12/13/2016*; 7:00 pm, BTN		Seton Hall	W 53–45	3–9	Louis Brown Athletic Center (1,626); Piscataway, NJ
12/17/2016*; 2:00 pm		Temple	L 37–48	3–10	Louis Brown Athletic Center (2,422); Piscataway, NJ
Big Ten regular season
12/28/2016; 2:00 pm, BTN		at Michigan	L 50–63	3–11 (0–1)	Crisler Center (3,957); Ann Arbor, MI
12/31/2016; 12:00 pm, BTN		Penn State	W 61–45	4–11 (1–1)	Louis Brown Athletic Center (2,011); Piscataway, NJ
01/04/2017; 7:00 pm		Wisconsin	W 68–52	5–11 (2–1)	Louis Brown Athletic Center (1,496); Piscataway, NJ
01/07/2017; 4:00 pm, BTN		at Illinois	L 41–78	5–12 (2–2)	State Farm Center (1,482); Champaign, IL
01/10/2017; 8:00 pm		at Nebraska	L 58–62	5–13 (2–3)	Pinnacle Bank Arena (4,193); Lincoln, NE
01/14/2017; 8:00 pm, BTN		Michigan State	W 62–58	6–13 (3–3)	Louis Brown Athletic Center (2,646); Piscataway, NJ
01/17/2017; 7:00 pm		Iowa	L 59–71	6–14 (3–4)	Louis Brown Athletic Center (1,517); Piscataway, NJ
01/22/2017; 3:00 pm, ESPN2		at No. 3 Maryland	L 71–80	6–15 (3–5)	Xfinity Center (6,236); College Park, MD
01/29/2017; 2:00 pm		Northwestern	L 37–55	6–16 (3–6)	Louis Brown Athletic Center (2,576); Piscataway, NJ
02/02/2017; 8:00 pm		at Iowa	L 57–71	6–17 (3–7)	Carver–Hawkeye Arena (3,884); Iowa City, IA
02/08/2017; 7:00 pm		Indiana	L 52–63	6–18 (3–8)	Louis Brown Athletic Center (1,637); Piscataway, NJ
02/11/2017; 3:00 pm		at Minnesota	L 46–80	6–19 (3–9)	Williams Arena (4,726); Minneapolis, MN
02/15/2017; 7:00 pm, BTN		Purdue	L 42–55	6–20 (3–10)	Louis Brown Athletic Center (1,819); Piscataway, NJ
02/18/2017; 12:00 pm, BTN		at Wisconsin	L 41–53	6–21 (3–11)	Kohl Center (6,680); Madison, WI
02/23/2017; 7:00 pm, BTN		at Northwestern	L 38–60	6–22 (3–12)	Welsh-Ryan Arena (1,020); Evanston, IL
02/26/2017; 3:00 pm, ESPN2		No. 12 Ohio State	L 45–73	6–23 (3–13)	Louis Brown Athletic Center (3,061); Piscataway, NJ
Big Ten Women's Tournament
03/01/2017; 4:30 pm, BTN	(14)	vs. (11) Wisconsin; First Round	L 55–61	6–24	Bankers Life Fieldhouse (4,830); Indianapolis, IN
*Non-conference game. ^{#}Rankings from AP Poll. (#) Tournament seedings in parentheses. All times are in Eastern Time.

== See also ==
2016–17 Rutgers Scarlet Knights men's basketball team
