= 2016–17 Purdue Boilermakers women's basketball team =

Intercollegiate basketball season

2016–17 Purdue Boilermakers women's basketball

NCAA Women's Tournament, second round
- Conference: Big Ten Conference
- Record: 23–13 (10–6 Big Ten)
- Head coach: Sharon Versyp (11th season)
- Assistant coaches: Nadine Morgan; Beth Couture; Lindsay Wisdom-Hylton
- Home arena: Mackey Arena

2016–17 Big Ten women's basketball standings
	Conf.				Overall
Team	W		L	PCT	W		L	PCT
No. 4 Maryland^{†}	15	–	1	.938	32	–	3	.914
No. 11 Ohio State*	15	–	1	.938	28	–	7	.800
Michigan	11	–	5	.688	28	–	9	.757
Indiana	10	–	6	.625	23	–	11	.676
Purdue	10	–	6	.625	23	–	13	.639
Michigan State	9	–	7	.563	21	–	12	.636
Penn State	9	–	7	.563	21	–	11	.656
Northwestern	8	–	8	.500	20	–	11	.645
Iowa	8	–	8	.500	20	–	14	.588
Minnesota	5	–	11	.313	15	–	16	.484
Illinois	3	–	13	.188	9	–	22	.290
Wisconsin	3	–	13	.188	9	–	22	.290
Nebraska	3	–	13	.188	7	–	22	.241
Rutgers	3	–	13	.188	6	–	24	.200
† 2017 Big Ten tournament winner * Tournament #1 seed Rankings from AP poll

The 2016–17 Purdue Boilermakers women's basketball team represented Purdue University during the 2016–17 NCAA Division I women's basketball season. The Boilermakers, led by eleventh-year head coach Sharon Versyp, played their home games at Mackey Arena and were members of the Big Ten Conference. They finished the season 23–13, 10–6 in Big Ten play to finish in tie for fourth place. They advanced to the championship game of the Big Ten women's tournament, where they lost to Maryland. They received an at-large bid to the NCAA women's tournament, where they defeated Green Bay in the first round before losing to Notre Dame in an overtime thriller in the second round.

== Roster ==
2016–17 Purdue Boilermakers women's basketball team
Players
Coaches

Pos.	#	Name	Height	Year	Previous school	Hometown
G	1	Ashley Morrissette	5 ft 9 in (1.75 m)	Sr	Twinsburg	Twinsburg, OH
G	2	Abby Abel	5 ft 5 in (1.65 m)	So	Carmel	Carmel, IN
G	3	Tiara Murphy	5 ft 7 in (1.7 m)	So	Washington	South Bend, IN
G	5	Miracle Gray	5 ft 6 in (1.68 m)	Fr	Stephenson	Stone Mountain, GA
G	10	Andreona Keys	5 ft 10 in (1.78 m)	Jr	Roswell	Atlanta, GA
G	11	Dominique Oden	5 ft 8 in (1.73 m)	Fr	Marist	Atlanta, GA
C	12	Nora Kiesler	6 ft 6 in (1.98 m)	So	Assumption	Louisville, KY
G	13	Bridget Perry	6 ft 2 in (1.88 m)	Sr	Roncalli	Mooresville, IN
F	20	Dominique McBryde	6 ft 2 in (1.88 m)	So	Bedford North Lawrence	Bedford, IN
C	22	Bree Horrocks	6 ft 5 in (1.96 m)	Jr	Buford	Buford, GA
F	32	Ae'Rianna Harris	6 ft 1 in (1.85 m)	Fr	Lawrence North	Indianapolis, IN
G	40	Lamina Cooper	5 ft 9 in (1.75 m)	Fr	Lawrence North	Indianapolis, IN

Head coach

- Sharon Versyp (Purdue)

Assistant coach(es)

- Nadine Morgan (James Madison)
- Beth Couture (Erskine)
- Lindsay Wisdom-Hylton (Purdue)

Legend

- (C) Team captain
- (S) Suspended
- (I) Ineligible
- (W) Walk-on
- Injured
- Current redshirt

Roster

== Schedule ==
Date time, TV	Rank^{#}	Opponent^{#}	Result	Record	Site (attendance) city, state
Exhibition
11/06/2016*; 2:00 pm		Ursuline College	W 86–58		Mackey Arena (5,622); West Lafayette, IN
Non-conference regular season
11/11/2016*; 5:00 pm		at Maine; Maine Tip-Off Tournament semifinals	L 47–67	0–1	Cross Insurance Center; Bangor, ME
11/12/2016*; 5:00 pm		vs. Villanova; Maine Tip-Off Tournament 3rd place game	L 44–58	0–2	Cross Insurance Center; Bangor, ME
11/17/2016*; 7:00 pm		USC Upstate	W 71–41	1–2	Mackey Arena (5,611); West Lafayette, IN
11/20/2016*; 2:00 pm		Southern Illinois	L 61–64	1–3	Mackey Arena (5,679); West Lafayette, IN
11/24/2016*; 1:30 pm		vs. Wichita State; Cancún Challenge Mayan Division	W 86–49	2–3	Hard Rock Hotel Riviera Maya (1,610); Cancún, Mexico
11/25/2016*; 1:30 pm		vs. Northeastern; Cancún Challenge Mayan Division	W 79–54	3–3	Hard Rock Hotel Riviera Maya (1,610); Cancún, Mexico
11/26/2016*; 1:30 pm		vs. No. 11 Stanford; Cancún Challenge Mayan Division	L 69–78	3–4	Hard Rock Hotel Riviera Maya (1,610); Cancún, Mexico
11/30/2016*; 7:00 pm		at Pittsburgh; ACC–Big Ten Women's Challenge	W 67–61	4–4	Peterson Events Center (702); Pittsburgh, PA
12/04/2016*; 2:00 pm		Colgate	W 71–51	5–4	Mackey Arena (5,610); West Lafayette, IN
12/06/2016*; 7:00 pm		Central Michigan	W 62–51	6–4	Mackey Arena (5,354); West Lafayette, IN
12/08/2016*; 7:00 pm		at Ball State	W 58–42	7–4	Worthen Arena (2,510); Muncie, IN
12/11/2016*; 1:00 pm		North Carolina Central	W 61–27	8–4	Mackey Arena (5,428); West Lafayette, IN
12/18/2016*; 4:00 pm		Eastern Michigan	W 77–50	9–4	Mackey Arena (5,611); West Lafayette, IN
12/21/2016*; 12:00 pm		IUPUI	L 62–67	9–5	Mackey Arena (6,611); West Lafayette, IN
Big Ten regular season
12/31/2016; 3:00 pm		at Northwestern	L 60–76	10–5 (0–1)	Welsh-Ryan Arena (1,205); Evanston, IL
01/04/2017; 6:00 pm		Michigan State	W 66–54	10–6 (1–1)	Mackey Arena (5,776); West Lafayette, IN
01/07/2017; 2:00 pm		Penn State	W 64–51	11–6 (2–1)	Mackey Arena (5,883); West Lafayette, IN
01/11/2017; 8:00 pm		at Wisconsin	W 79–57	12–6 (3–1)	Kohl Center (3,437); Madison, WI
01/15/2017; 3:30 pm, ESPN2		No. 11 Ohio State	L 56–61	12–7 (3–2)	Mackey Arena (6,803); West Lafayette, IN
01/19/2017; 8:00 pm, BTN		at Indiana; Rivalry/Crimson and Gold Cup	L 60–74	12–8 (3–3)	Simon Skjodt Assembly Hall (3,129); Bloomington, IN
01/22/2017; 5:00 pm, BTN		at Michigan State	W 76–66	13–8 (4–3)	Breslin Center (9,808); East Lansing, MI
01/26/2017; 6:00 pm, BTN		Nebraska	W 88–45	14–8 (5–3)	Mackey Arena (5,594); West Lafayette, IN
02/02/2017; 8:00 pm, BTN		No. 3 Maryland	L 70–85	14–9 (5–4)	Mackey Arena (5,671); West Lafayette, IN
02/05/2017; 3:00 pm		at Illinois	W 72–64	15–9 (6–4)	State Farm Center (1,889); Champaign, IL
02/08/2017; 6:00 pm		No. 21 Michigan	L 62–72	15–10 (6–5)	Mackey Arena (5,910); West Lafayette, IN
02/11/2017; 2:00 pm		at Penn State	L 73–79	15–11 (6–6)	Bryce Jordan Center (3,875); University Park, PA
02/15/2017; 7:00 pm		at Rutgers	W 55–42	16–11 (7–6)	Louis Brown Athletic Center (1,819); Piscataway, NJ
02/19/2017; 12:00 pm, BTN		Iowa	W 72–52	17–11 (8–6)	Mackey Arena (7,151); West Lafayette, IN
02/23/2017; 9:00 pm, BTN		at Minnesota	W 67–54	18–11 (9–6)	Williams Arena (2,832); Minneapolis, MN
02/26/2017; 4:00 pm, BTN		Northwestern	W 61–59	19–11 (10–6)	Mackey Arena (6,407); West Lafayette, IN
Big Ten Women's Tournament
03/02/2017; 2:30 pm, BTN	(5)	vs. (12) Illinois; Second Round	W 72–58	20–11	Bankers Life Fieldhouse (3,570); Indianapolis, IN
03/03/2017; 2:30 pm, BTN	(5)	vs. (4) Indiana; Quarterfinals	W 66–60	21–11	Bankers Life Fieldhouse (5,004); Indianapolis, IN
03/04/2017; 3:00 pm, BTN	(5)	vs. (1) No. 9 Ohio State; Semifinals	W 71–60	22–11	Bankers Life Fieldhouse; Indianapolis, IN
03/05/2017; 7:00 pm, ESPN2	(5)	vs. (2) No. 4 Maryland; Championship Game	L 64–74	22–12	Bankers Life Fieldhouse (4,881); Indianapolis, IN
NCAA Women's Tournament
03/16/2017*; 4:00 pm, ESPN2	(9 L)	vs. (8 L) Green Bay; First Round	W 74–62	23–12	Edmund P. Joyce Center; South Bend, IN
03/19/2017*; 9:00 pm, ESPN	(9 L)	at (1 L) No. 2 Notre Dame; Second Round	L 82–88 ^{OT}	23–13	Edmund P. Joyce Center (5,422); South Bend, IN
*Non-conference game. ^{#}Rankings from AP Poll. (#) Tournament seedings in parentheses. L=Lexington Region. All times are in Eastern Time.

== Rankings ==
Regular season polls
Poll	Pre- season	Week 2	Week 3	Week 4	Week 5	Week 6	Week 7	Week 8	Week 9	Week 10	Week 11	Week 12	Week 13	Week 14	Week 15	Week 16	Week 17	Week 18	Week 19	Final
AP																				N/A
Coaches																				

Legend
	Increase in ranking
	Decrease in ranking
	Not ranked previous week
(RV)	Received votes

== See also ==
- 2016–17 Purdue Boilermakers men's basketball team
