= 2016–17 Michigan Wolverines women's basketball team =

Intercollegiate basketball season

2016–17 Michigan Wolverines women's basketball

WNIT Champions
- Conference: Big Ten Conference
- Record: 28–9 (11–5 Big Ten)
- Head coach: Kim Barnes Arico (5th season)
- Assistant coaches: Melanie Moore; Megan Duffy; Joy McCorvey
- Home arena: Crisler Center

2016–17 Big Ten women's basketball standings
	Conf.				Overall
Team	W		L	PCT	W		L	PCT
No. 4 Maryland^{†}	15	–	1	.938	32	–	3	.914
No. 11 Ohio State*	15	–	1	.938	28	–	7	.800
Michigan	11	–	5	.688	28	–	9	.757
Indiana	10	–	6	.625	23	–	11	.676
Purdue	10	–	6	.625	23	–	13	.639
Michigan State	9	–	7	.563	21	–	12	.636
Penn State	9	–	7	.563	21	–	11	.656
Northwestern	8	–	8	.500	20	–	11	.645
Iowa	8	–	8	.500	20	–	14	.588
Minnesota	5	–	11	.313	15	–	16	.484
Illinois	3	–	13	.188	9	–	22	.290
Wisconsin	3	–	13	.188	9	–	22	.290
Nebraska	3	–	13	.188	7	–	22	.241
Rutgers	3	–	13	.188	6	–	24	.200
† 2017 Big Ten tournament winner * Tournament #1 seed Rankings from AP poll

The 2016–17 Michigan Wolverines women's basketball team represented University of Michigan during the 2016–17 NCAA Division I women's basketball season. The Wolverines, led by fifth year head coach Kim Barnes Arico, played their home games at the Crisler Center and were members of the Big Ten Conference.

== Roster ==
2016–17 Michigan Wolverines women's basketball team
Players
Coaches

Pos.	#	Name	Height	Year	Previous school	Hometown
G	1	Kysre Gondrezick	5 ft 9 in (1.75 m)	Fr	Benton Harbor	Benton Harbor, MI
G	2	Siera Thompson (C)	5 ft 7 in (1.7 m)	Jr	Serra	Gardena, CA
G	3	Katelynn Flaherty	5 ft 7 in (1.7 m)	Jr	Metuchen	Point Pleasant, NJ
G/F	5	Kayla Robbins	6 ft 1 in (1.85 m)	Fr	St. John's	Bowie, MD
G	10	Nicole Munger	5 ft 11 in (1.8 m)	So	Central Bucks West	Doylestown, PA
G	11	Jillian Dunston	5 ft 11 in (1.8 m)	Jr	Academy of the Holy Cross	Germantown, MD
G	14	Akienreh Johnson	6 ft 0 in (1.83 m)	Fr	Rogers	Toledo, OH
G	20	Danielle Williams (C)	5 ft 9 in (1.75 m)	Sr	St. Mary's	Phoenix, AZ
F	21	Sam Trammel	6 ft 1 in (1.85 m)	RS So	Eastview	Minnetonka, MN
F	22	KeAsja Peace	6 ft 3 in (1.91 m)	Fr	Rogers	Toledo, OH
G/F	23	Maria Backman	6 ft 1 in (1.85 m)	So	Cardinal Spellman	Bronx, NY
C	30	Hallie Thome	6 ft 5 in (1.96 m)	So	Chagrin Falls	Chagrin Falls, OH
G	34	Boogie Brozoski	5 ft 6 in (1.68 m)	So	Long Island Lutheran	Cambria Heights, NY

Head coach

- Kim Barnes Arico (Montclair State)

Assistant coach(es)

- Melanie Moore (Siena)
- Megan Duffy (Notre Dame)
- Joy McCorvey (St. John's)

Legend

- (C) Team captain
- (S) Suspended
- (I) Ineligible
- (W) Walk-on
- Injured
- Current redshirt

Roster

== Schedule ==
Date time, TV	Rank^{#}	Opponent^{#}	Result	Record	Site (attendance) city, state
Exhibition
11/03/2016*; 7:00 pm		Wayne State	W 93–41		Crisler Center; Ann Arbor, MI
Non-conference regular season
11/11/2016*; 6:30 pm		Oakland	W 101–63	1–0	Crisler Center (2,386); Ann Arbor, MI
11/13/2016*; 3:00 pm		Niagara	W 107–35	2–0	Crisler Center (1,997); Ann Arbor, MI
11/18/2016*; 7:00 pm		Howard	W 109–41	3–0	Crisler Center (3,708); Ann Arbor, MI
11/21/2016*; 7:00 pm		Western Michigan	W 66–40	4–0	Crisler Center (2,051); Ann Arbor, MI
11/24/2016*; 8:00 pm		vs. No. 25 Gonzaga; Paradise Jam tournament Reef Division	W 78–66	5–0	Sports and Fitness Center (1,734); Saint Thomas, USVI
11/25/2016*; 8:00 pm		vs. Winthrop; Paradise Jam Tournament Reef Division	W 76–39	6–0	Sports and Fitness Center (1,067); Saint Thomas, USVI
11/26/2016*; 8:00 pm		vs. No. 10 Florida State; Paradise Jam Tournament Reef Division	L 62–76	6–1	Sports and Fitness Center (2,962); Saint Thomas, USVI
12/01/2016*; 7:00 pm		at Georgia Tech; ACC–Big Ten Women's Challenge	W 92–52	7–1	Hank McCamish Pavilion (818); Atlanta, GA
12/05/2016*; 7:00 pm		at Xavier	L 58–61	7–2	Cintas Center (721); Cincinnati, OH
12/09/2016*; 3:00 pm		at San Diego State	W 92–57	8–2	Viejas Arena (2,632); San Diego, CA
12/11/2016*; 2:00 pm, P12N		at No. 9 UCLA	L 64–84	8–3	Pauley Pavilion (1,688); Los Angeles, CA
12/13/2016*; 6:00 pm		Ohio	W 69–46	9–3	Crisler Center (1,802); Ann Arbor, MI
12/17/2016*; 12:00 pm		Vermont	W 78–56	10–3	Crisler Center (2,187); Ann Arbor, MI
12/22/2016*; 3:00 pm		American	W 82–33	11–3	Crisler Center (2,085); Ann Arbor, MI
Big Ten regular season
12/28/2016; 2:00 pm, BTN		Rutgers	W 63–50	12–3 (1–0)	Crisler Center (3,957); Ann Arbor, MI
01/01/2017; 3:00 pm		at Wisconsin	W 73–56	13–3 (2–0)	Kohl Center (4,361); Madison, WI
01/07/2017; 12:00 pm, BTN		at No. 11 Ohio State; Rivalry	L 87–96	13–4 (2–1)	Value City Arena (6,636); Columbus, OH
01/10/2017; 6:00 pm, BTN		Indiana	W 78–74	14–4 (3–1)	Crisler Center (1,850); Ann Arbor, MI
01/15/2017; 4:30 pm, BTN		Minnesota	W 84–69	15–4 (4–1)	Crisler Center (2,781); Ann Arbor, MI
01/19/2017; 6:00 pm, BTN		at No. 3 Maryland	L 70–83	15–5 (4–2)	Xifinty Center (4,666); Lincoln, NE
01/22/2017; 3:00 pm		at Nebraska	W 84–51	16–5 (5–2)	Pinnacle Bank Arena (4,763); Lincoln, NE
01/25/2017; 7:00 pm		Northwestern	W 80–54	17–5 (6–2)	Crisler Center (2,097); Ann Arbor, MI
02/01/2017; 8:00 pm		at Illinois	W 86–70	18–5 (7–2)	State Farm Center (1,156); Champaign, IL
02/05/2017; 2:00 pm		Iowa	W 72–70	19–5 (8–2)	Crisler Center (3,327); Ann Arbor, MI
02/08/2017; 6:00 pm	No. 21	at Purdue	W 72–62	20–5 (9–2)	Mackey Arena (5,910); West Lafayette, IN
02/12/2017; 2:00 pm, BTN	No. 21	Wisconsin	W 75–66	21–5 (10–2)	Crisler Center (3,545); Ann Arbor, MI
02/16/2017; 2:00 pm, BTN	No. 20	at Indiana	L 61–72	21–6 (10–3)	Simon Skjodt Assembly Hall (2,499); Bloomington, IN
02/19/2017; 2:00 pm, BTN	No. 20	Michigan State; Rivalry	L 68–86	21–7 (10–4)	Crisler Center (12,707); Ann Arbor, MI
02/23/2017; 7:00 pm	No. 25	Nebraska	W 88–60	22–7 (11–4)	Crisler Center (2,276); Ann Arbor, MI
02/26/2017; 2:00 pm, BTN	No. 25	at Penn State	L 75–76	22–8 (11–5)	Bryce Jordan Center (8,213); University Park, PA
Big Ten Women's tournament
03/03/2017; 9:00 pm, BTN	(3)	vs. (6) Michigan State; Quarterfinals	L 64–74	22–9	Bankers Life Fieldhouse (4,065); Indianapolis, IN
Women's National Invitation Tournament
03/16/2017*; 7:00 pm		Kent State; First Round	W 67–60	23–9	Crisler Center (788); Ann Arbor, MI
03/18/2017*; 2:00 pm		Wright State; Second Round	W 71–66	24–9	Crisler Center (721); Ann Arbor, MI
03/23/2017*; 6:00 pm		St. John's; Third Round	W 60–40	25–9	Crisler Center (685); Ann Arbor, MI
03/25/2017*; 2:00 pm		Virginia Tech; Quarterfinals	W 80–62	26–9	Crisler Center (1,017); Ann Arbor, MI
03/29/2017*; 7:00 pm		Villanova; Semifinals	W 65–61	27–9	Crisler Center (1,467); Ann Arbor, MI
04/01/2017*; 3:00 pm, CBSSN		Georgia Tech; Championship Game	W 89–79 ^{3OT}	28–9	Calihan Hall (4,417); Detroit, MI
*Non-conference game. ^{#}Rankings from AP Poll. (#) Tournament seedings in parentheses. All times are in Eastern Time.

== Rankings ==
Regular season polls
Poll	Pre- season	Week 2	Week 3	Week 4	Week 5	Week 6	Week 7	Week 8	Week 9	Week 10	Week 11	Week 12	Week 13	Week 14	Week 15	Week 16	Week 17	Week 18	Week 19	Final
AP	NR	NR	NR	RV	RV	NR	NR	RV	NR	NR	RV	RV	RV	21	20	25	RV	RV	NR	N/A
Coaches	RV	RV	RV	RV	RV	RV	NR	RV	RV	RV	RV	RV	RV	22	20	24	RV	RV	RV	RV

Legend
	Increase in ranking
	Decrease in ranking
	Not ranked previous week
(RV)	Received Votes

== See also ==
- 2016–17 Michigan Wolverines men's basketball team
