= 2016–17 Indiana Hoosiers women's basketball team =

Intercollegiate basketball season

2016–17 Indiana Hoosiers women's basketball

WNIT, Quarterfinals
- Conference: Big Ten Conference
- Record: 23–11 (10–6 Big Ten)
- Head coach: Teri Moren (3rd season)
- Assistant coaches: Rhet Wierzba; Janese Banks; Glenn Box
- Home arena: Simon Skjodt Assembly Hall

2016–17 Big Ten women's basketball standings
	Conf.				Overall
Team	W		L	PCT	W		L	PCT
No. 4 Maryland^{†}	15	–	1	.938	32	–	3	.914
No. 11 Ohio State*	15	–	1	.938	28	–	7	.800
Michigan	11	–	5	.688	28	–	9	.757
Indiana	10	–	6	.625	23	–	11	.676
Purdue	10	–	6	.625	23	–	13	.639
Michigan State	9	–	7	.563	21	–	12	.636
Penn State	9	–	7	.563	21	–	11	.656
Northwestern	8	–	8	.500	20	–	11	.645
Iowa	8	–	8	.500	20	–	14	.588
Minnesota	5	–	11	.313	15	–	16	.484
Illinois	3	–	13	.188	9	–	22	.290
Wisconsin	3	–	13	.188	9	–	22	.290
Nebraska	3	–	13	.188	7	–	22	.241
Rutgers	3	–	13	.188	6	–	24	.200
† 2017 Big Ten tournament winner * Tournament #1 seed Rankings from AP poll

The 2016–17 Indiana Hoosiers women's basketball team represented Indiana University Bloomington during the 2016–17 NCAA Division I women's basketball season. The Hoosiers were led by third year head coach and 2015–2016 Big Ten Coach of the Year Teri Moren, played their home games at Simon Skjodt Assembly Hall and were members of the Big Ten Conference. They finished the season of 23–11, 10–6 in Big Ten play to finish in a tie for fourth place. They lost in the quarterfinals of the Big Ten women's tournament to their in-state rival Purdue. They were invited to the Women's National Invitation Tournament where they defeated Ball State, Saint Louis and SMU in the first, second and third round before losing to Villanova in the quarterfinals.

== Preseason ==
In the 2015–2016 season, the Hoosiers finished 21–12, 12–6 in Big Ten play to finish in fourth place. 2015–2016 was one of the most successful seasons in franchise history. The Hoosiers were ranked in the AP preseason poll at #23, their first time ever being ranked in the preseason.

== Roster ==
2016–17 Indiana Hoosiers women's basketball team
Players
Coaches

Pos.	#	Name	Height	Year	Previous school	Hometown
G	2	Amber Deane	5 ft 9 in (1.75 m)	Sr	Detroit Country Day; Dayton	Lathrup Village, MI
G	3	Tyra Buss	5 ft 8 in (1.73 m)	Jr	Mount Carmel	Mount Carmel, IL
G	5	Ria Gulley	5 ft 9 in (1.75 m)	Fr	Tom C. Clark	San Antonio, TX
F	11	Kym Royster	6 ft 2 in (1.88 m)	So	Newark	Newark, OH
F	13	Darby Foresman	6 ft 3 in (1.91 m)	Fr	Heritage Christian	Indianapolis, IN
G	21	Karlee McBride	5 ft 10 in (1.78 m)	Sr	Villa Maria	Erie, PA
G	22	Tia Elbert	5 ft 7 in (1.7 m)	RS So	Tartan; Marquette	Oakdale, MN
G	23	Alexis Gassion	5 ft 11 in (1.8 m)	Sr	Fairborn	Fairborn, OH
G	24	Tyshee Towner	5 ft 9 in (1.75 m)	Sr	East Aurora; Wabash Valley College	Aurora, IL
F	31	Bre Wickware	6 ft 1 in (1.85 m)	Fr	Guyer	Denton, TX
G	32	Laken Wairau	5 ft 10 in (1.78 m)	So	Christchurch Girls'	Christchurch, New Zealand
F	33	Amanda Cahill	6 ft 2 in (1.88 m)	Jr	Clyde	Clyde, OH
C	43	Jenn Anderson	6 ft 3 in (1.91 m)	Sr	Westfield	Sheridan, IN
C	44	Danielle Williams	6 ft 4 in (1.93 m)	So	North Crowley	Fort Worth, TX

Head coach

- Teri Moren (Purdue)

Assistant coach(es)

- Rhet Wierzba (Austin Peay)
- Janese Banks (Oral Roberts)
- Glenn Box (Southeast Missouri State)

Legend

- (C) Team captain
- (S) Suspended
- (I) Ineligible
- (W) Walk-on
- Injured
- Current redshirt

Roster

== Schedule ==
Date time, TV	Rank^{#}	Opponent^{#}	Result	Record	High points	High rebounds	High assists	Site (attendance) city, state
Exhibition
11/06/2016*; 2:00 pm	No. 23	Indianapolis	W 87–58		18 – Royster	8 – Royster	4 – Deane	Simon Skjodt Assembly Hall; Bloomington, IN
Non-conference regular season
11/11/2016*; 7:00 pm	No. 23	Presbyterian	W 71–37	1–0	15 – Buss	11 – Cahill	3 – McBride	Simon Skjodt Assembly Hall (2,422); Bloomington, IN
11/13/2016*; 2:00 pm	No. 23	Vanderbilt	W 94–61	2–0	22 – Gassion	7 – Anderson	5 – Tied	Simon Skjodt Assembly Hall (3,029); Bloomington, IN
11/17/2016*; 6:30 pm	No. 23	at Chattanooga	W 79–73	3–0	23 – Buss	8 – Gassion	8 – Gassion	McKenzie Arena (1,709); Chattanooga, TN
11/19/2016*; 3:00 pm, FCS	No. 23	at WKU	L 74–85	3–1	24 – Buss	11 – Anderson	6 – Cahill	E. A. Diddle Arena (1,832); Bowling Green, KY
11/23/2016*; 2:00 pm		UMass Lowell	W 79–45	4–1	18 – Gassion	6 – Tied	6 – Gassion	Simon Skjodt Assembly Hall (2,670); Bloomington, IN
11/27/2016*; 2:00 pm, SECN		at Auburn	L 67–71	4–2	23 – Buss	7 – Cahill	5 – Tied	Auburn Arena (1,752); Auburn, AL
12/01/2016*; 7:00 pm, ACCN Extra		at NC State; ACC–Big Ten Women's Challenge	L 70–84	4–3	38 – Buss	8 – Cahill	4 – Gassion	Reynolds Coliseum (2,203); Raleigh, NC
12/06/2016*; 12:30 pm		at North Texas	W 94–64	5–3	21 – Buss	10 – Cahill	5 – Tied	The Super Pit (2,164); Denton, TX
12/08/2016*; 7:00 pm		Northern Kentucky	W 100–49	6–3	16 – McBride	15 – Gassion	10 – Buss	Simon Skjodt Assembly Hall (2,207); Bloomington, IN
12/11/2016*; 2:00 pm		Valparaiso	W 87–58	7–3	19 – Gassion	11 – Cahill	6 – Buss	Simon Skjodt Assembly Hall (2,611); Bloomington, IN
12/17/2016*; 5:00 pm		Oakland	W 84–59	8–3	17 – Cahill	20 – Gassion	6 – Buss	Simon Skjodt Assembly Hall (2,665); Bloomington, IN
12/20/2016*; 7:45 pm		vs. Florida; Florida Sunshine Classic	W 102–88	9–3	35 – Buss	10 – Cahill	8 – Gassion	Warden Arena (829); Winter Haven, FL
12/21/2016*; 7:45 pm		vs. Stony Brook; Florida Sunshine Classic	W 74–60	10–3	15 – Buss	13 – Cahill	6 – Cahill	Warden Arena (304); Winter Haven, FL
Big Ten regular Season
12/28/2016; 7:00 pm		at Penn State	W 89–70	11–3 (1–0)	26 – Buss	8 – Tied	5 – Tied	Bryce Jordan Center (2,736); University Park, PA
12/31/2016; 3:00 pm, CBS		No. 14 Ohio State	L 82–92	11–4 (1–1)	28 – Cahill	9 – Cahill	9 – Buss	Simon Skjodt Assembly Hall (4,282); Bloomington, IN
01/04/2017; 7:00 pm		Minnesota	W 78–62	12–4 (2–1)	26 – Gassion	9 – Cahill	7 – Buss	Simon Skjodt Assembly Hall (2,409); Bloomington, IN
01/10/2017; 6:00 pm, BTN		at Michigan	L 74–78	12–5 (2–2)	21 – Tied	12 – Anderson	5 – Buss	Crisler Center (1,850); Ann Arbor, MI
01/14/2017; 3:00 pm		at Northwestern	L 67–80	12–6 (2–3)	17 – Tied	13 – Cahill	7 – Gassion	Welsh-Ryan Arena (2,482); Evanston, IL
01/19/2017; 8:00 pm, BTN		Purdue; Rivalry/Crimson and Gold Cup	W 74–60	13–6 (3–3)	19 – Cahill	8 – Cahill	8 – Buss	Simon Skjodt Assembly Hall (3,129); Bloomington, IN
01/23/2017; 7:00 pm, BTN		Penn State	W 72–66	14–6 (4–3)	21 – Buss	11 – Cahill	7 – Gassion	Simon Skjodt Assembly Hall (2,404); Bloomington, IN
01/29/2017; 3:00 pm		at Wisconsin	W 78–54	15–6 (5–3)	19 – Buss	9 – Cahill	3 – Tied	Kohl Center (4,430); Madison, WI
02/02/2017; 6:00 pm, BTN		at Michigan State	L 60–69	15–7 (5–4)	17 – Cahill	8 – Cahill	6 – Tied	Breslin Center (6,438); East Lansing, MI
02/05/2017; 12:00 pm, ESPN2		No. 3 Maryland	L 56–92	15–8 (5–5)	16 – Cahill	9 – Cahill	7 – Gassion	Simon Skjodt Assembly Hall (4,038); Bloomington, IN
02/08/2017; 7:00 pm		at Rutgers	W 63–52	16–8 (6–5)	20 – Cahill	7 – Cahill	9 – Buss	Louis Brown Athletic Center (1,637); Piscataway, NJ
02/11/2017; 12:00 pm, BTN		Northwestern	W 66–38	17–8 (7–5)	19 – Buss	11 – Anderson	6 – Cahill	Simon Skjodt Assembly Hall (3,517); Bloomington, IN
02/16/2017; 6:00 pm, BTN		No. 20 Michigan	W 72–61	18–8 (8–5)	21 – Buss	12 – Cahill	7 – Buss	Simon Skjodt Assembly Hall (2,499); Bloomington, IN
02/19/2017; 3:00 pm		at Nebraska	L 64–67	18–9 (8–6)	16 – Buss	11 – Cahill	6 – Buss	Pinnacle Bank Arena (4,981); Lincoln, NE
02/22/2017; 7:00 pm		Iowa	W 80–77 ^{2OT}	19–9 (9–6)	21 – Buss	7 – Tied	9 – Gassion	Simon Skjodt Assembly Hall (2,976); Bloomington, IN
02/25/2017; 1:00 pm, BTN		at Illinois	W 74–60	20–9 (10–6)	21 – Buss	15 – Cahill	5 – Gassion	State Farm Center (2,550); Champaign, IL
Big Ten Women's Tournament
03/03/2017; 2:30 pm, BTN	(4)	vs. (5) Purdue; Quarterfinals	L 60–66	20–10	19 – Buss	13 – Gassion	4 – Tied	Bankers Life Fieldhouse (5,004); Indianapolis, IN
Women's National Invitation Tournament
03/16/2017*; 7:00 pm		Ball State; First Round	W 71–58	21–10	19 – Buss	6 – Tied	6 – Gassion	Simon Skjodt Assembly Hall (2,028); Bloomington, IN
03/19/2017*; 2:00 pm		Saint Louis; Second Round	W 71–53	22–10	17 – Cahill	7 – Tied	4 – Tied	Simon Skjodt Assembly Hall (2,526); Bloomington, IN
03/23/2017*; 7:00 pm		SMU; Third Round	W 64–44	23–10	17 – McBride	9 – Cahill	9 – Gassion	Simon Skjodt Assembly Hall (3,003); Bloomington, IN
03/26/2017*; 2:00 pm		Villanova; Quarterfinals	L 57–69	23–11	21 – Buss	12 – Gassion	4 – Gassion	Simon Skjodt Assembly Hall (4,770); Bloomington, IN
*Non-conference game. ^{#}Rankings from AP Poll. (#) Tournament seedings in parentheses. All times are in Eastern Time.

== Rankings ==
Ranking movement Legend: ██ Increase in ranking. ██ Decrease in ranking. NR = Not ranked. RV = Received votes.
Poll	Pre	Wk 2	Wk 3	Wk 4	Wk 5	Wk 6	Wk 7	Wk 8	Wk 9	Wk 10	Wk 11	Wk 12	Wk 13	Wk 14	Wk 15	Wk 16	Wk 17	Wk 18	Wk 19	Final
AP	23	23	RV	NR	NR	NR	NR	NR	NR	NR	NR	NR	NR	NR	NR	NR	NR	NR	NR	N/A
Coaches	RV	RV	RV	NR	NR	NR	NR	NR	NR	NR	NR	NR	NR	NR	RV	RV	RV	RV	RV	NR

== See also ==
2016–17 Indiana Hoosiers men's basketball team
