= 2016–17 Maryland Terrapins women's basketball team =

Intercollegiate basketball season

2016–17 Maryland Terrapins women's basketball
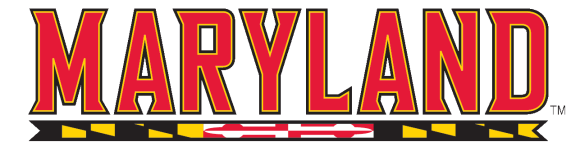

South Point Thanksgiving Shootout champions Big Ten regular season co-champions & Tournament Champions

NCAA women's tournament, Sweet Sixteen
- Conference: Big Ten Conference

Ranking
- Coaches: No. 8
- AP: No. 4
- Record: 32–3 (15–1 Big Ten)
- Head coach: Brenda Frese (15th season)
- Assistant coaches: Shay Robinson; Bett Shelby; Terry Nooner
- Home arena: Xfinity Center

2016–17 Big Ten women's basketball standings
	Conf.				Overall
Team	W		L	PCT	W		L	PCT
No. 4 Maryland^{†}	15	–	1	.938	32	–	3	.914
No. 11 Ohio State*	15	–	1	.938	28	–	7	.800
Michigan	11	–	5	.688	28	–	9	.757
Indiana	10	–	6	.625	23	–	11	.676
Purdue	10	–	6	.625	23	–	13	.639
Michigan State	9	–	7	.563	21	–	12	.636
Penn State	9	–	7	.563	21	–	11	.656
Northwestern	8	–	8	.500	20	–	11	.645
Iowa	8	–	8	.500	20	–	14	.588
Minnesota	5	–	11	.313	15	–	16	.484
Illinois	3	–	13	.188	9	–	22	.290
Wisconsin	3	–	13	.188	9	–	22	.290
Nebraska	3	–	13	.188	7	–	22	.241
Rutgers	3	–	13	.188	6	–	24	.200
† 2017 Big Ten tournament winner * Tournament #1 seed Rankings from AP poll

The 2016–17 Maryland Terrapins women's basketball team represented the University of Maryland, College Park in the 2016–17 NCAA Division I women's basketball season. The Terrapins, led by fifteenth-year head coach Brenda Frese, played their home games at the Xfinity Center and were third year members of the Big Ten Conference. They finished the season 32–3, 15–1 in Big Ten play, to win share the Big Ten Regular season title with Ohio State. They were also champions of the Big Ten Women's Tournament for the third straight year, and received an automatic bid to the NCAA women's basketball tournament, where they defeated Bucknell and West Virginia in the first and second rounds, before being upset by Oregon in the sweet sixteen.

== Roster ==
2016–17 Maryland Terrapins women's basketball team
Players
Coaches

Pos.	#	Name	Height	Year	Previous school	Hometown
F	0	Aja Ellison	6 ft 3 in (1.91 m)	Jr	Life Center Academy	Burlington, OH
G	1	Ieshia Small	6 ft 0 in (1.83 m)	RS Jr	Florida State Univ. HS; Baylor	Miami, FL
G	2	Kiara Leslie	5 ft 11 in (1.8 m)	Jr	Solon	Holly Springs, NC
G	3	Kaila Charles	5 ft 11 in (1.8 m)	Fr	Riverdale Baptist	Glenn Dale, MD
G	5	Destiny Slocum	5 ft 7 in (1.7 m)	Fr	Mountain View	Meridian, ID
G	12	Kristen Confroy	5 ft 9 in (1.75 m)	Jr	Holly Springs	Solo, OH
C	14	Jenna Staiti	6 ft 6 in (1.98 m)	Fr	West Forsyth	Cumming, GA
F	15	Kiah Gillespie	6 ft 2 in (1.88 m)	So	Capital Prep Magnet	Meriden, CT
G	21	Sarah Myers	5 ft 10 in (1.78 m)	Fr	West Forsyth	Cumming, GA
G	22	Blair Watson	6 ft 0 in (1.83 m)	Fr	Nutley	Nutley, NJ
F	24	Stephanie Jones	6 ft 2 in (1.88 m)	Fr	Aberdeen	Havre de Grace, MD
F	32	Shatori Walker-Kimbrough	5 ft 11 in (1.8 m)	Sr	Hopewell	Aliquippa, PA
F	34	Brianna Fraser	6 ft 3 in (1.91 m)	So	South Shore	Brooklyn, NY
C	42	Brionna Jones	6 ft 3 in (1.91 m)	Sr	Aberdeen	Havre de Grace, MD

Head coach

- Brenda Frese (Arizona)

Assistant coach(es)

- Shay Robinson (Central Florida)
- Bett Shelby (Greensboro)
- Terry Nooner (Kansas)

Legend

- (C) Team captain
- (S) Suspended
- (I) Ineligible
- (W) Walk-on
- Injured
- Current redshirt

Roster

== Schedule ==
Date time, TV	Rank^{#}	Opponent^{#}	Result	Record	Site (attendance) city, state
Exhibition
11/02/2016*; 6:30 pm	No. 6	Bluefield State	W 146–17		Xfinity Center (1,138); College Park, MD
11/06/2016*; 2:00 pm	No. 6	Mary Baldwin	W 153–27		Xfinity Center; College Park, MD
Non-conference regular season
11/13/2016*; 1:00 pm	No. 6	UMass Lowell	W 100–44	1–0	Xfinity Center (3,958); College Park, MD
11/16/2016*; 6:30 pm	No. 6	Maryland Eastern Shore	W 106–61	2–0	Xfinity Center (1,505); College Park, MD
11/18/2016*; 11:00 am	No. 6	Mount St. Mary's	W 106–42	3–0	Xfinity Center (4,108); College Park, MD
11/20/2016*; 12:00 pm	No. 6	at Niagara	W 96–64	4–0	Gallagher Center (757); Lewiston, NY
11/25/2016*; 4:00 pm	No. 6	vs. No. 23 Arizona State; South Point Thanksgiving Shootout	W 83–42	5–0	South Point Arena; Enterprise, NV
11/26/2016*; 6:30 pm	No. 6	vs. Washington State; South Point Thanksgiving Shootout	W 79–69	6–0	South Point Arena; Enterprise, NV
12/01/2016*; 7:00 pm	No. 5	at No. 7 Louisville; ACC–Big Ten Women's Challenge	W 78–72	7–0	KFC Yum! Center (7,816); Louisville, KY
12/04/2016*; 2:00 pm, BTN	No. 5	UMBC	W 92–42	8–0	Xfinity Center (2,607); College Park, MD
12/06/2016*; 7:00 pm	No. 4	Towson	W 97–63	9–0	Xfinity Center (1,343); College Park, MD
12/08/2016*; 6:30 pm	No. 4	Saint Peter's	W 101–49	10–0	Xfinity Center (3,940); College Park, MD
12/12/2016*; 7:00 pm	No. 4	at Loyola (MD)	W 79–60	11–0	Reitz Arena (1,009); Baltimore, MD
12/21/2016*; 7:00 pm	No. 4	at Duquesne	W 77–57	12–0	Palumbo Center (1,288); Pittsburgh, PA
12/29/2016*; 6:00 pm, ESPN2	No. 4	No. 1 Connecticut	L 81–87	12–1	Xfinity Center (17,950); College Park, MD
Big Ten regular season
01/01/2017; 6:00 pm	No. 4	at Minnesota	W 83–72	13–1 (1–0)	Williams Arena (4,884); Minneapolis, MN
01/04/2017; 8:00 pm	No. 3	at Nebraska	W 93–49	14–1 (2–0)	Pinnacle Bank Arena (4,299); Lincoln, NE
01/07/2017; 2:00 pm, BTN	No. 3	Northwestern	W 96–55	15–1 (3–0)	Xfinity Center (5,214); College Park, MD
01/11/2017; 6:30 pm	No. 3	Penn State	W 89–83	16–1 (4–0)	Xfinity Center (4,680); College Park, MD
01/14/2017; 4:00 pm, BTN	No. 3	at Iowa	W 98–82	17–1 (5–0)	Carver–Hawkeye Arena (7,043); Iowa City, IA
01/19/2017; 6:00 pm, BTN	No. 3	Michigan	W 83–70	18–1 (6–0)	Xfinity Center (4,666); College Park, MD
01/22/2017; 3:00 pm, ESPN2	No. 3	Rutgers	W 80–71	19–1 (7–0)	Xfinity Center (6,236); College Park, MD
01/26/2017; 8:00 pm	No. 3	at Illinois	W 94–49	20–1 (8–0)	State Farm Center (1,126); Champaign, IL
01/29/2017; 2:00 pm, ESPN2	No. 3	Iowa	W 100–81	21–1 (9–0)	Xfinity Center (7,988); College Park, MD
02/02/2017; 8:00 pm, BTN	No. 3	at Purdue	W 85–70	22–1 (10–0)	Mackey Arena (5,671); West Lafayette, IN
02/05/2017; 12:00 pm, ESPN2	No. 3	at Indiana	W 92–56	23–1 (11–0)	Simon Skjodt Assembly Hall (4,038); Bloomington, IN
02/09/2017; 7:00 pm	No. 3	Illinois	W 84–59	24–1 (12–0)	Xfinity Center (4,160); College Park, MD
02/12/2017; 2:00 pm, ESPN2	No. 3	at Michigan State	W 89–72	25–1 (13–0)	Breslin Center (10,646); East Lansing, MI
02/15/2017; 7:00 pm	No. 2	Wisconsin	W 89–40	26–1 (14–0)	Xfinity Center (5,302); College Park, MD
02/20/2017; 7:00 pm, ESPN2	No. 2	at No. 12 Ohio State	L 87–98	26–2 (14–1)	Value City Arena (6,505); Columbus, OH
02/26/2017; 12:00 pm, BTN	No. 2	Minnesota	W 93–60	27–2 (15–1)	Xfinity Center (10,107); College Park, MD
Big Ten Women's Tournament
03/03/2017; 6:30 pm, BTN	(2) No. 4	vs. (10) Minnesota; Quarterfinals	W 92–80	28–2	Bankers Life Fieldhouse (4,065); Indianapolis, IN
03/04/2017; 6:30 pm, BTN	(2) No. 4	vs. (6) Michigan State; Semifinals	W 100–89	29–2	Bankers Life Fieldhouse (5,408); Indianapolis, IN
03/05/2017; 7:00 pm, ESPN2	(2) No. 4	vs. (5) Purdue; Championship Game	W 74–64	30–2	Bankers Life Fieldhouse (6,129); Indianapolis, IN
NCAA Women's Tournament
03/17/2017*; 12:00 pm, ESPN2	(3 B) No. 4	(14 B) Bucknell; First Round	W 103–61	31–2	Xfinity Center (3,511); College Park, MD
03/19/2017*; 2:35 pm, ESPN2	(3 B) No. 4	(6 B) West Virginia; Second Round	W 83–56	32–2	Xfinity Center (6,129); College Park, MD
03/25/2017*; 11:30 am, ESPN	(3 B) No. 4	vs. (10 B) Oregon; Sweet Sixteen	L 63–77	32–3	Webster Bank Arena; Bridgeport, CT
*Non-conference game. ^{#}Rankings from AP Poll. (#) Tournament seedings in parentheses. B=Bridgeport Region. All times are in Eastern.

== Rankings ==
Ranking movement Legend: ██ Increase in ranking. ██ Decrease in ranking. NR = Not ranked. RV = Received votes.
Poll	Pre	Wk 2	Wk 3	Wk 4	Wk 5	Wk 6	Wk 7	Wk 8	Wk 9	Wk 10	Wk 11	Wk 12	Wk 13	Wk 14	Wk 15	Wk 16	Wk 17	Wk 18	Wk 19	Final
AP	6	6	6	5	4	4	4	4	3	3	3	3	3	3	2	2	4	4	4	N/A
Coaches	5	5	5	5	4	3	3	3	3	3	3	3	3	2	2	5	4	3	3	8

== See also ==
- 2016–17 Maryland Terrapins men's basketball team
