= 2016–17 Iowa Hawkeyes women's basketball team =

Intercollegiate basketball season

2016–17 Iowa Hawkeyes women's basketball

WNIT, Quarterfinals
- Conference: Big Ten Conference
- Record: 20–14 (8–8 Big Ten)
- Head coach: Lisa Bluder (17th season)
- Assistant coaches: Jan Jensen; Jenni Fitzgerald; Lacey Goldwire
- Home arena: Carver–Hawkeye Arena

2016–17 Big Ten women's basketball standings
	Conf.				Overall
Team	W		L	PCT	W		L	PCT
No. 4 Maryland^{†}	15	–	1	.938	32	–	3	.914
No. 11 Ohio State*	15	–	1	.938	28	–	7	.800
Michigan	11	–	5	.688	28	–	9	.757
Indiana	10	–	6	.625	23	–	11	.676
Purdue	10	–	6	.625	23	–	13	.639
Michigan State	9	–	7	.563	21	–	12	.636
Penn State	9	–	7	.563	21	–	11	.656
Northwestern	8	–	8	.500	20	–	11	.645
Iowa	8	–	8	.500	20	–	14	.588
Minnesota	5	–	11	.313	15	–	16	.484
Illinois	3	–	13	.188	9	–	22	.290
Wisconsin	3	–	13	.188	9	–	22	.290
Nebraska	3	–	13	.188	7	–	22	.241
Rutgers	3	–	13	.188	6	–	24	.200
† 2017 Big Ten tournament winner * Tournament #1 seed Rankings from AP poll

The 2016–17 Iowa Hawkeyes women's basketball team represented the University of Iowa during the 2016–17 NCAA Division I women's basketball season. The Hawkeyes, led by seventeenth-year head coach Lisa Bluder, played their home games at the Carver–Hawkeye Arena and were members of the Big Ten Conference. They finished the season 20–14, 8–8 in Big Ten play to finish in a tie for eighth place. They lost in the second round of the Big Ten women's tournament to Northwestern. They were invited to the Women's National Invitation Tournament where they defeated Missouri State, South Dakota, Colorado in the first, second and third rounds before losing to Washington State in the quarterfinals.

== Roster ==
2016–17 Iowa Hawkeyes women's basketball team
Players
Coaches

Pos.	#	Name	Height	Year	Previous school	Hometown
G	1	Alexa Kastanek	5 ft 10 in (1.78 m)	Sr	Southeast	Lincoln, NE
G	2	Ally Disterhoft	6 ft 0 in (1.83 m)	Sr	West	Iowa City, IA
G	3	Makenzie Meyer	5 ft 10 in (1.78 m)	Fr	Mason City	Mason City, IA
F	4	Chase Coley	6 ft 3 in (1.91 m)	Jr	Washburn	Minneapolis, MN
G	5	Alexis Sevillian	5 ft 6 in (1.68 m)	Fr	Goodrich	Goodrich, MI
F	10	Megan Gustafson	6 ft 3 in (1.91 m)	So	South Shore	Port Wing, WI
G	11	Tania Davis	5 ft 4 in (1.63 m)	So	Goodrich	Grand Blanc, MI
F	21	Hannah Stewart	6 ft 2 in (1.88 m)	So	Bishop Ryan Catholic	Minot, ND
G	22	Kathleen Doyle	5 ft 9 in (1.75 m)	Fr	Benet Academy	LaGrange Park, IL
F	23	Christina Buttenham	6 ft 0 in (1.83 m)	Jr	St. Mary Catholic Secondary	Hamilton, ON
F	34	Carly Mohns	6 ft 1 in (1.85 m)	RS So	Brodhead	Brodhead, WI
G	35	Bre Cera	5 ft 10 in (1.78 m)	Fr	Mukwonago	Mukwonago, WI
F	40	Hailey Schneden	6 ft 2 in (1.88 m)	Jr	Assumption	Davenport, IA
F	43	Amanda Ollinger	6 ft 1 in (1.85 m)	Fr	Linn-Mar	Cedar Rapids, IA

Head coach

- Lisa Bluder (Northern Iowa)

Assistant coach(es)

- Jan Jensen (Drake)
- Jenni Fitzgerald (Drake)
- Lacey Goldwire (Oklahoma State)

Legend

- (C) Team captain
- (S) Suspended
- (I) Ineligible
- (W) Walk-on
- Injured
- Current redshirt

Roster

== Schedule ==
Date time, TV	Rank^{#}	Opponent^{#}	Result	Record	Site (attendance) city, state
Exhibition
11/06/2016*; 2:00 pm		Lewis	W 61–35		Carver–Hawkeye Arena (4,024); Iowa City, IA
Non-conference regular season
11/11/2016*; 6:00 pm		Oral Roberts	W 96–76	1–0	Carver–Hawkeye Arena (4,254); Iowa City, IA
11/13/2016*; 12:00 pm		Hampton	W 84–51	2–0	Carver–Hawkeye Arena (3,522); Iowa City, IA
11/16/2016*; 7:30 pm		at North Dakota	W 75–60	3–0	Betty Engelstad Sioux Center (2,261); Grand Forks, ND
11/19/2016*; 10:30 am		Massachusetts; Hawkeye Classic semifinals	W 71–30	4–0	Carver–Hawkeye Arena (3,435); Iowa City, IA
11/20/2016*; 2:00 pm		South Dakota State; Hawkeye Classic championship	L 64–66	4–1	Carver–Hawkeye Arena (3,826); Iowa City, IA
11/24/2016*; 8:00 pm		vs. No. 9 UCLA; Cancún Challenge Riviera Division	L 65–78	4–2	Hard Rock Hotel Riviera Maya (1,610); Cancún, Mexico
11/25/2016*; 8:00 pm		vs. James Madison; Cancún Challenge Riviera Division	W 90–75	5–2	Hard Rock Hotel Riviera Maya (1,610); Cancún, Mexico
11/30/2016*; 8:00 pm, BTN		No. 1 Notre Dame; ACC–Big Ten Women's Challenge	L 58–73	5–3	Carver–Hawkeye Arena (3,809); Iowa City, IA
12/04/2016*; 7:00 pm		Northern Iowa	W 88–39	6–3	Carver–Hawkeye Arena (4,666); Iowa City, IA
12/07/2016*; 7:00 pm		Iowa State; Iowa Corn Cy-Hawk Series	W 88–76	7–3	Carver–Hawkeye Arena (4,579); Iowa City, IA
12/09/2016*; 7:00 pm		Robert Morris	W 81–60	8–3	Carver–Hawkeye Arena (3,378); Iowa City, IA
12/18/2016*; 2:00 pm, MC22		at Drake	L 76–81	8–4	Knapp Center (3,307); Des Moines, IA
12/20/2016*; 5:00 pm		Kent State	W 83–48	9–4	Carver–Hawkeye Arena (3,563); Iowa City, IA
Big Ten regular season
12/28/2016; 3:00 pm, BTN		at Illinois	L 65–70	9–5 (0–1)	State Farm Center (1,584); Champaign, IL
12/31/2016; 2:00 pm		Nebraska	W 75–72	10–5 (1–1)	Carver–Hawkeye Arena (6,750); Iowa City, IA
01/03/2017; 6:00 pm, BTN		at Penn State	L 58–71	10–6 (1–2)	Bryce Jordan Center (2,258); University Park, PA
01/11/2017; 7:00 pm		Illinois	W 78–58	11–6 (2–2)	Carver–Hawkeye Arena (3,834); Iowa City, IA
01/14/2017; 3:00 pm, BTN		No. 3 Maryland	L 82–98	11–7 (2–3)	Carver–Hawkeye Arena (7,043); Iowa City, IA
01/17/2017; 6:00 pm		at Rutgers	W 71–59	12–7 (3–3)	Louis Brown Athletic Center (1,517); Piscataway, NJ
01/21/2017; 2:00 pm		Minnesota	W 80–65	13–7 (4–3)	Carver–Hawkeye Arena (7,191); Iowa City, IA
01/29/2017; 1:00 pm, ESPN2		at No. 3 Maryland	L 81–100	13–8 (4–4)	Xifinity Center (7,988); College Park, MD
02/02/2017; 7:00 pm		Rutgers	W 71–57	14–8 (5–4)	Carver–Hawkeye Arena (3,884); Iowa City, IA
02/05/2017; 1:00 pm		at Michigan	L 70–72	14–9 (5–5)	Crisler Center (3,327); Ann Arbor, MI
02/09/2017; 6:00 pm, BTN		Michigan State	W 87–83 ^{OT}	15–9 (6–5)	Carver–Hawkeye Arena (4,384); Iowa City, IA
02/12/2017; 11:00 am, BTN		at No. 13 Ohio State	L 81–88	15–10 (6–6)	Value City Arena (6,679); Columbus, OH
02/16/2017; 7:00 pm, BTN		Northwestern	W 78–69	16–10 (7–6)	Carver–Hawkeye Arena (4,167); Iowa City, IA
02/19/2017; 11:00 am, BTN		at Purdue	L 52–72	16–11 (7–7)	Mackey Arena (7,151); West Lafayette, IN
02/22/2017; 6:00 pm		at Indiana	L 77–80 ^{2OT}	16–12 (7–8)	Simon Skjodt Assembly Hall (2,946); Bloomington, IN
02/26/2017; 2:00 pm		Wisconsin	W 71–60	17–12 (8–8)	Carver–Hawkeye Arena (5,603); Iowa City, IA
Big Ten Women's Tournament
03/02/2017; 11:00 am, BTN	(8)	vs. (9) Northwestern; Second Round	L 73–78	17–13	Bankers Life Fieldhouse; Indianapolis, IN
Women's National Invitation Tournament
03/16/2017*; 7:00 pm		Missouri State; First Round	W 95–74	18–13	Carver–Hawkeye Arena (3,226); Iowa City, IA
03/18/2017*; 3:00 pm		South Dakota; Second Round	W 78–73	19–13	Carver–Hawkeye Arena (2,294); Iowa City, IA
03/23/2017*; 7:00 pm		Colorado; Third Round	W 80–62	20–13	Carver–Hawkeye Arena (3,735); Iowa City, IA
03/26/2017*; 2:00 pm		Washington State; Quarterfinals	L 66–74	20–14	Carver–Hawkeye Arena (5,146); Iowa City, IA
*Non-conference game. ^{#}Rankings from AP Poll. (#) Tournament seedings in parentheses. All times are in Eastern Time.

== See also ==
2016–17 Iowa Hawkeyes men's basketball team

== Rankings ==
Regular season polls
Poll	Pre- Season	Week 2	Week 3	Week 4	Week 5	Week 6	Week 7	Week 8	Week 9	Week 10	Week 11	Week 12	Week 13	Week 14	Week 15	Week 16	Week 17	Week 18	Week 19	Final
AP	NR	NR	NR	NR	NR															N/A
Coaches	RV	NR	NR	NR	NR															

Legend
	Increase in ranking
	Decrease in ranking
	Not ranked previous week
(RV)	Received Votes
