= 2016–17 Wisconsin Badgers women's basketball team =

Intercollegiate basketball season

2016–17 Wisconsin Badgers women's basketball
- Conference: Big Ten Conference
- Record: 9–22 (3–13 Big Ten)
- Head coach: Jonathan Tsipis (1st season)
- Assistant coaches: Sasha Palmer; Craig Carter; Myia McCurdy
- Home arena: Kohl Center

2016–17 Big Ten women's basketball standings
	Conf.				Overall
Team	W		L	PCT	W		L	PCT
No. 4 Maryland^{†}	15	–	1	.938	32	–	3	.914
No. 11 Ohio State*	15	–	1	.938	28	–	7	.800
Michigan	11	–	5	.688	28	–	9	.757
Indiana	10	–	6	.625	23	–	11	.676
Purdue	10	–	6	.625	23	–	13	.639
Michigan State	9	–	7	.563	21	–	12	.636
Penn State	9	–	7	.563	21	–	11	.656
Northwestern	8	–	8	.500	20	–	11	.645
Iowa	8	–	8	.500	20	–	14	.588
Minnesota	5	–	11	.313	15	–	16	.484
Illinois	3	–	13	.188	9	–	22	.290
Wisconsin	3	–	13	.188	9	–	22	.290
Nebraska	3	–	13	.188	7	–	22	.241
Rutgers	3	–	13	.188	6	–	24	.200
† 2017 Big Ten tournament winner * Tournament #1 seed Rankings from AP poll

The 2016–17 Wisconsin Badgers women's basketball team represented University of Wisconsin–Madison during the 2016–17 NCAA Division I women's basketball season. The Badgers, led by first-year head coach Jonathan Tsipis, played their home games at the Kohl Center and were members of the Big Ten Conference. They finished the season 9–22, 3–13 in Big Ten play to finish in a four-way for 11th place. They defeated Rutgers in the first round of the Big Ten women's tournament before losing to Michigan State.

== Roster ==
2016–17 Wisconsin Badgers women's basketball team
Players
Coaches

Pos.	#	Name	Height	Year	Previous school	Hometown
G	3	Suzanne Gilreath	5 ft 4 in (1.63 m)	Fr	Fridley	Brooklyn Park, MN
G	4	Ashley Kelsick	5 ft 7 in (1.7 m)	Jr	Highland; Boston College	Palmdale, CA
G	5	Roichelle Marble	5 ft 7 in (1.7 m)	RS So	East	Des Moines, IA
G	10	Kendra Van Leeuwen	5 ft 10 in (1.78 m)	Fr	St. John's College	Brantford, ON
F	11	Marsha Howard	5 ft 10 in (1.78 m)	So	Crete Monee	Chicago, IL
F	14	Abby Laszewski	6 ft 3 in (1.91 m)	Fr	Avon	Hartford, CT
G	15	Lexy Richardson	5 ft 9 in (1.75 m)	So	Verona Area	Verona, WI
G	20	Taylor Kuhn	5 ft 10 in (1.78 m)	RS Sr	Medford Area	Medford, WI
G	23	Cayla McMorris	5 ft 10 in (1.78 m)	Jr	Park Center	Brooklyn Park, MN
F/C	24	Malayna Johnson	6 ft 4 in (1.93 m)	RS Jr	Montini Catholic	Bellwood, IL
G	30	Gabby Gregory	5 ft 8 in (1.73 m)	Fr	MacArthur	Irving, TX
F	33	Courtney Fredrickson	6 ft 2 in (1.88 m)	Fr	Minnetonka	Excelsior, MN
F/C	35	Kendall Shaw	6 ft 4 in (1.93 m)	RS Sr	Barbers Hill; Vanderbilt	Mont Belvieu, TX
F	40	Avyanna Young	6 ft 1 in (1.85 m)	RS Jr	Rufus King; Milwaukee	Milwaukee, WI
F	43	Grace Mueller	6 ft 2 in (1.88 m)	Fr	Verona Area	Verona, WI

Head coach

- Jonathan Tsipis (North Carolina)

Assistant coach(es)

- Sasha Palmer (Northern Michigan)
- Craig Carter (Rutgers)
- Myia McCurdy (Rutgers)

Legend

- (C) Team captain
- (S) Suspended
- (I) Ineligible
- (W) Walk-on
- Injured
- Current redshirt

Roster

== Schedule ==
Date time, TV	Rank^{#}	Opponent^{#}	Result	Record	Site (attendance) city, state
Exhibition
11/06/2016*; 4:00 pm		Winona State	W 78–71		Kohl Center (3,240); Madison, WI
11/08/2016*; 7:00 pm		UW–Stout	W 103–45		Kohl Center (2,928); Madison, WI
Non-conference regular season
11/11/2016*; 4:30 pm		at Charlotte	L 48–63	0–1	Dale F. Halton Arena (4,866); Charlotte, NC
11/13/2016*; 4:00 pm		Saint Francis (PA)	L 100–103	0–2	Kohl Center (3,013); Madison, WI
11/16/2016*; 7:00 pm		Dayton	L 64–83	0–3	Kohl Center (2,944); Madison, WI
11/20/2016*; 2:00 pm		Butler	W 60–55	1–3	Kohl Center (3,458); Madison, WI
11/22/2016*; 7:00 pm		at Milwaukee	L 63–80	1–4	Klotsche Center (1,183); Milwaukee, WI
11/26/2016*; 4:30 pm		vs. Ole Miss; Lady Rebel Round-Up semifinals	L 44–69	1–5	Cox Pavilion (931); Paradise, NV
11/27/2016*; 2:00 pm		vs. Tennessee State; Lady Rebel Round-Up 3rd place game	W 80–70	2–5	Cox Pavilion; Paradise, NV
12/01/2016*; 7:00 pm		North Carolina; ACC–Big Ten Women's Challenge	L 59–72	2–6	Kohl Center (2,972); Madison, WI
12/04/2016*; 2:00 pm, ESPN3		at Illinois State	W 64–46	3–6	Redbird Arena (1,209); Normal, IL
12/06/2016*; 7:00 pm		Idaho State	L 35–42	3–7	Kohl Center (2,852); Madison, WI
12/08/2016*; 7:00 pm		Mississippi Valley State	W 103–61	4–7	Kohl Center (2,916); Madison, WI
12/11/2016*; 1:00 pm, BTN		Marquette	L 75–81	4–8	Kohl Center (4,974); Madison, WI
12/18/2016*; 7:00 pm, ESPN3		at Green Bay	W 54–53	5–8	Kress Events Center (3,443); Green Bay, WI
Big Ten regular season
01/01/2017; 2:00 pm		Michigan	L 56–73	5–9 (0–1)	Kohl Center (4,361); Madison, WI
01/04/2017; 6:00 pm		at Rutgers	L 52–68	5–10 (0–2)	Louis Brown Athletic Center (1,496); Piscataway, NJ
01/07/2017; 5:00 pm		at Minnesota	L 60–88	5–11 (0–3)	Williams Arena (4,471); Minneapolis, MN
01/11/2017; 7:00 pm		Purdue	L 57–79	5–12 (0–4)	Kohl Center (3,437); Madison, WI
01/16/2017; 6:00 pm, BTN		at Penn State	L 46–76	5–13 (0–5)	Bryce Jordan Center (2,616); University Park, PA
01/19/2017; 6:00 pm		at No. 16 Ohio State	L 61–70	5–14 (0–6)	Value City Arena (4,466); Columbus, OH
01/25/2017; 7:00 pm		Michigan State	L 57–81	5–15 (0–7)	Kohl Center (3,085); Madison, WI
01/29/2017; 2:00 pm		Indiana	L 54–78	5–16 (0–8)	Kohl Center (4,430); Madison, WI
02/01/2017; 7:00 pm		at Northwestern	L 43–63	5–17 (0–9)	Welsh-Ryan Arena (924); Evanston, IL
02/04/2017; 1:00 pm, BTN		No. 14 Ohio State	L 68-96	5–18 (0–10)	Kohl Center (4,454); Madison, WI
02/09/2017; 7:00 pm		Nebraska	W 82–56	6–18 (1–10)	Kohl Center (4,073); Madison, WI
02/12/2017; 1:00 pm, BTN		at No. 21 Michigan	L 66–75	6–19 (1–11)	Crisler Center (3,545); Ann Arbor, MI
02/15/2017; 6:00 pm		at No. 2 Maryland	L 40–89	6–20 (1–12)	Xfinity Center (5,302); College Park, MD
02/18/2017; 11:00 am, BTN		Rutgers	W 53–41	7–20 (2–12)	Kohl Center (6,680); Madison, WI
02/22/2017; 7:00 pm		Illinois	W 59–55	8–20 (3–12)	Kohl Center (3,255); Madison, WI
02/26/2017; 2:00 pm, BTN		at Iowa	L 60–71	8–21 (3–13)	Carver–Hawkeye Arena (5,603); Iowa City, IA
Big Ten Women's Tournament
03/01/2017; 3:00 pm, BTN	(11)	vs. (14) Rutgers; First Round	W 61–55	9–21	Bankers Life Fieldhouse (4,830); Indianapolis, IN
03/02/2017; 8:00 pm, BTN	(11)	vs. (6) Michigan State; Second Round	L 63–70	9–22	Bankers Life Fieldhouse (3,431); Indianapolis, IN
*Non-conference game. ^{#}Rankings from AP Poll. (#) Tournament seedings in parentheses. All times are in Central Time.

== See also ==
- 2016–17 Wisconsin Badgers men's basketball team
