= 2016–17 Illinois Fighting Illini women's basketball team =

Intercollegiate basketball season

2016–17 Illinois Fighting Illini women's basketball
- Conference: Big Ten Conference
- Record: 9–22 (3–13 Big Ten)
- Head coach: Matt Bollant (5th season)
- Assistant coaches: LaKale Malone; Tianna Kirkland; Jody Martinez
- Home arena: State Farm Center

2016–17 Big Ten women's basketball standings
	Conf.				Overall
Team	W		L	PCT	W		L	PCT
No. 4 Maryland^{†}	15	–	1	.938	32	–	3	.914
No. 11 Ohio State*	15	–	1	.938	28	–	7	.800
Michigan	11	–	5	.688	28	–	9	.757
Indiana	10	–	6	.625	23	–	11	.676
Purdue	10	–	6	.625	23	–	13	.639
Michigan State	9	–	7	.563	21	–	12	.636
Penn State	9	–	7	.563	21	–	11	.656
Northwestern	8	–	8	.500	20	–	11	.645
Iowa	8	–	8	.500	20	–	14	.588
Minnesota	5	–	11	.313	15	–	16	.484
Illinois	3	–	13	.188	9	–	22	.290
Wisconsin	3	–	13	.188	9	–	22	.290
Nebraska	3	–	13	.188	7	–	22	.241
Rutgers	3	–	13	.188	6	–	24	.200
† 2017 Big Ten tournament winner * Tournament #1 seed Rankings from AP poll

The 2016–17 Illinois Fighting Illini women's basketball team represented University of Illinois at Urbana–Champaign during the 2016–17 NCAA Division I women's basketball season. The Fighting Illini, led by fifth-year head coach Matt Bollant, played their home games at the State Farm Center as members of the Big Ten Conference. They finished the season 9–22, 3–13 in Big Ten play to finish in a four-way for 11th place. They advanced to the second round of the Big Ten women's tournament by beating Wisconsin before they lost to Purdue.

On March 14, 2017, head coach Matt Bollant was fired. He finished at Illinois with a five-year record of 61–94. On March 22, the school hired five-time Division III national champion and two-time Division III coach of the year recipient Nancy Fahey as head coach.

== Roster ==
2016–17 Illinois Fighting Illini women's basketball team
Players
Coaches

Pos.	#	Name	Height	Year	Previous school	Hometown
G	1	Brandi Beasley	5 ft 6 in (1.68 m)	Fr	Ridgeway	Memphis, TN
G	5	Cierra Rice	5 ft 9 in (1.75 m)	So	Grosse Point South	Grosse Pointe, MI
F	11	Cydnee Kinslow	6 ft 2 in (1.88 m)	RS Fr	Freedom; Pepperdine	Oakley, CA
G	12	Ashley McConnell	5 ft 9 in (1.75 m)	Sr	Fremd	Palatine, IL
G	13	Peca Holešínská	5 ft 9 in (1.75 m)	Fr	Sportovni Ludvika Danka	Vracov, Czech Republic
F	20	Sarah Overcash	6 ft 1 in (1.85 m)	Fr	St. John's College	Chevy Chase, MD
G	23	Jaelyne Kirkpatrick	5 ft 7 in (1.7 m)	So	St. Ignatius of Loyola	Oakville, ON
G	25	Kennedy Cattenhead	5 ft 10 in (1.78 m)	RS Jr	Bolingbrook	Bolingbrook, IL
G	30	Courtney Joens	5 ft 10 in (1.78 m)	Fr	Iowa City	Iowa City, IA
F	35	Alex Wittinger	6 ft 1 in (1.85 m)	So	Delano	Delano, MN
F	50	Ali Andrews	6 ft 2 in (1.88 m)	Fr	Huntley	Lake in the Hills, IL

Head coach

- Matt Bollant (Winona State)

Assistant coach(es)

- LaKale Malone (Indiana)
- Tianna Kirkland (Bethel (IN))
- Jody Martinez (Ferris State)

Legend

- (C) Team captain
- (S) Suspended
- (I) Ineligible
- (W) Walk-on
- Injured
- Current redshirt

Roster

== Schedule ==
Date time, TV	Rank^{#}	Opponent^{#}	Result	Record	Site (attendance) city, state
Exhibition
11/06/2016*; 2:00 pm		Drury	L 60–66		State Farm Center; Champaign, IL
Non-conference regular season
11/11/2016*; 11:00 am		Marshall	L 53–55	0–1	State Farm Center (969); Champaign, IL
11/13/2016*; 12:00 pm		Arkansas–Pine Bluff	W 70–58	1–1	State Farm Center (1,180); Champaign, IL
11/17/2016*; 12:00 pm		Memphis	L 54–64	1–2	State Farm Center (2,358); Champaign, IL
11/20/2016*; 12:00 pm		USC Upstate	W 77–57	2–2	State Farm Center (1,133); Champaign, IL
11/22/2016*; 7:00 pm		Mercer	L 33–51	2–3	State Farm Center (1,051); Champaign, IL
11/30/2016*; 7:00 pm		Wake Forest; ACC–Big Ten Women's Challenge	L 70–79	2–4	State Farm Center (1,243); Champaign, IL
12/02/2016*; 7:00 pm		IPFW	W 56–33	3–4	State Farm Center (1,173); Champaign, IL
12/04/2016*; 1:00 pm		at George Washington	L 56–72	3–5	Charles E. Smith Center (466); Washington, D.C.
12/07/2016*; 6:00 pm		at South Dakota	L 68–77	3–6	Sanford Coyote Sports Center (1,262); Vermillion, SD
12/11/2016*; 2:00 pm		Wright State	W 76–72	4–6	State Farm Center (1,238); Champaign, IL
12/17/2017*; 2:00 pm		Florida Gulf Coast	W 82–73	5–6	State Farm Center (1,051); Champaign, IL
12/19/2016*; 6:00 pm, ESPN3		at Central Michigan	L 52–81	5–7	McGuirk Arena (1,389); Mount Pleasant, MI
12/22/2016*; 6:00 pm		at Ohio	L 68–80	5–8	Convocation Center (1,211); Athens, OH
Big Ten regular season
12/28/2016; 3:00 pm, BTN		Iowa	W 70–65	6–8 (1–0)	State Farm Center (1,584); Champaign, IL
01/01/2017; 2:00 pm		at Michigan State	L 47–71	6–9 (1–1)	Breslin Center (5,757); East Lansing, MI
01/07/2017; 3:00 pm, BTN		Rutgers	W 78–41	7–9 (2–1)	State Farm Center (1,482); Champaign, IL
01/11/2017; 7:00 pm		at Iowa	L 58–78	7–10 (2–2)	Carver–Hawkeye Arena (3,834); Iowa City, IA
01/15/2017; 2:00 pm		Nebraska	W 79–59	8–10 (3–2)	State Farm Center (2,675); Champaign, IL
01/18/2017; 7:00 pm		at Minnesota	L 50–78	8–11 (3–3)	Williams Arena (3,009); Minneapolis, MN
01/22/2017; 4:00 pm		at No. 16 Ohio State	L 64–88	8–12 (3–4)	Value City Arena (5,694); Columbus, OH
01/26/2017; 7:00 pm		No. 3 Maryland	L 49–94	8–13 (3–5)	State Farm Center (1,126); Champaign, IL
01/29/2017; 1:00 pm		at Penn State	L 66–82	8–14 (3–6)	Bryce Jordan Center (3,570); University Park, MD
02/01/2017; 7:00 pm		Michigan	L 70–86	8–15 (3–7)	State Farm Center (1,156); Champaign, IL
02/05/2017; 2:00 pm		Purdue	L 64–72	8–16 (3–8)	State Farm Center (1,889); Champaign, IL
02/09/2017; 6:00 pm		at No. 3 Maryland	L 59–84	8–17 (3–9)	Xfinity Center (4,160); College Park, MD
02/14/2017; 7:00 pm		Penn State	L 62–80	8–18 (3–10)	State Farm Center (1,288); Champaign, IL
02/19/2017; 2:00 pm		at Northwestern	L 53–66	8–19 (3–11)	Welsh-Ryan Arena (2,233); Evanston, IL
02/22/2017; 7:00 pm		at Wisconsin	L 55–59	8–20 (3–12)	Kohl Center (3,255); Madison, WI
02/25/2017; 12:00 pm, BTN		Indiana	L 60–74	8–21 (3–13)	State Farm Center (2,550); Champaign, IL
Big Ten Women's Tournament
03/01/2017; 12:30 pm, BTN	(12)	vs. (13) Nebraska; First Round	W 79–70	9–21	Bankers Life Fieldhouse (4,830); Indianapolis, IN
03/02/2017; 1:30 pm, BTN	(12)	vs. (5) Purdue; Second Round	L 58–72	9–22	Bankers Life Fieldhouse (3,570); Indianapolis, IN
*Non-conference game. ^{#}Rankings from AP Poll. (#) Tournament seedings in parentheses. All times are in Central Time.

== See also ==
- 2016–17 Illinois Fighting Illini men's basketball team
