= 2017 Big Ten women's basketball tournament =

- 2017 Tournament logo
- Classification: Division I
- Season: 2016–17
- Teams: 14
- Site: Bankers Life Fieldhouse; Indianapolis, IN
- Champions: Maryland (3rd title)
- Winning coach: Brenda Frese (3rd title)
- MVP: Brionna Jones (Maryland)
- Attendance: 32,417
- Television: Big Ten Network, ESPN2

2016–17 Big Ten women's basketball standings
	Conf.				Overall
Team	W		L	PCT	W		L	PCT
No. 4 Maryland^{†}	15	–	1	.938	32	–	3	.914
No. 11 Ohio State*	15	–	1	.938	28	–	7	.800
Michigan	11	–	5	.688	28	–	9	.757
Indiana	10	–	6	.625	23	–	11	.676
Purdue	10	–	6	.625	23	–	13	.639
Michigan State	9	–	7	.563	21	–	12	.636
Penn State	9	–	7	.563	21	–	11	.656
Northwestern	8	–	8	.500	20	–	11	.645
Iowa	8	–	8	.500	20	–	14	.588
Minnesota	5	–	11	.313	15	–	16	.484
Illinois	3	–	13	.188	9	–	22	.290
Wisconsin	3	–	13	.188	9	–	22	.290
Nebraska	3	–	13	.188	7	–	22	.241
Rutgers	3	–	13	.188	6	–	24	.200
† 2017 Big Ten tournament winner * Tournament #1 seed Rankings from AP poll

The 2017 Big Ten women's basketball tournament was the postseason tournament held from March 1–5, 2017 at Bankers Life Fieldhouse in Indianapolis.

== Seeds ==
All 14 Big Ten schools participated in the tournament. Teams were seeded by 2016–17 Big Ten Conference women's basketball season record. The top 10 teams received a first-round bye and the top 4 teams received a double bye.

Seeding for the tournament was determined at the close of the regular conference season:

Seed	School	Conf	Tiebreak 1	Tiebreak 2
1	Ohio State	15–1	1–0 vs. Maryland	
2	Maryland	15–1	0–1 vs. Ohio State	
3	Michigan	11–5		
4	Indiana	10–6	1–0 vs. Purdue	
5	Purdue	10–6	0–1 vs. Indiana	
6	Michigan State	9–7	1–0 vs. Penn State	
7	Penn State	9–7	0–1 vs. Michigan State	
8	Iowa	8–8	1–0 vs. Northwestern	
9	Northwestern	8–8	0–1 vs. Iowa	
10	Minnesota	5–11		
11	Wisconsin	3–13	3–1 vs. Ill, Neb, Rutg	
12	Illinois	3–13	2–1 vs. Wisc, Neb, Rutg	
13	Nebraska	3–13	1–2 vs. Wisc, Ill, Rutg	
14	Rutgers	3–13	1–3 vs. Wisc, Ill, Neb	

== Schedule ==
Session	Game	Time*	Matchup^{#}	Television	Attendance	Score
First round - Wednesday, March 1
1	1	1:30 pm	#13 Nebraska vs. #12 Illinois	BTN	4,830	70–79
1	2	4:00 pm	#14 Rutgers vs. #11 Wisconsin	BTN	4,830	55–61
Second round - Thursday, March 2
2	3	12:00 pm	#9 Northwestern vs. #8 Iowa	BTN	3,570	78–73
2	4	2:30 pm	#12 Illinois vs. #5 Purdue	BTN	3,570	58–72
3	5	6:30 pm	#10 Minnesota vs. #7 Penn State	BTN	3,431	70–64
3	6	9:00 pm	#11 Wisconsin vs. #6 Michigan State	BTN	3,431	63-70
Quarterfinals - Friday, March 3
4	7	12:00 pm	#9 Northwestern vs. #1 Ohio State	BTN	5,004	68–99
4	8	2:30 pm	#5 Purdue vs. #4 Indiana	BTN	5,004	66–60
5	9	6:30 pm	#10 Minnesota vs. #2 Maryland	BTN	4,065	80–92
5	10	9:00 pm	#6 Michigan State vs. #3 Michigan	BTN	4,065	74–64
Semifinals - Saturday, March 4
6	11	3:00 pm	#5 Purdue vs. #1 Ohio State	BTN	5,408	71–60
6	12	5:30 pm	#6 Michigan State vs. #2 Maryland	BTN	5,408	100–89
Championship - Sunday, March 5
7	13	7:00 pm	#5 Purdue vs. #2 Maryland	ESPN2	6,109	74–64

*Game times in Eastern Time. #Rankings denote tournament seeding.

== Bracket ==
First round Wednesday, March 1 BTN
12	Illinois	79
13	Nebraska	70
11	Wisconsin	61
14	Rutgers	55

Second round Thursday, March 2 BTN
8	Iowa	73
9	Northwestern	78
5	Purdue	72
12	Illinois	58
7	Penn State	64
10	Minnesota	70
6	Michigan State	70
11	Wisconsin	63

Quarterfinals; Friday, March 3 BTN
1	Ohio State	99
9	Northwestern	68
4	Indiana	60
5	Purdue	66
2	Maryland	92
10	Minnesota	80
3	Michigan	64
6	Michigan State	74

Semifinals; Saturday, March 4 BTN
1	Ohio State	60
5	Purdue	71
2	Maryland	100
6	Michigan State	89

Championship; Sunday, March 5 ESPN2
5	Purdue	64
2	Maryland	74

== See also ==
- 2017 Big Ten Conference men's basketball tournament
