= 2016–17 Dayton Flyers women's basketball team =

Intercollegiate basketball season

2016–17 Dayton Flyers women's basketball

Atlantic 10 regular season co–champions & Tournament Champions

NCAA Women's Tournament, first round
- Conference: Atlantic 10 Conference
- Record: 22–10 (13–3 A-10)
- Head coach: Shauna Green (1st season)
- Assistant coaches: Simon Harris; Jeff House; Kayla Ard
- Home arena: University of Dayton Arena

2016–17 Atlantic 10 women's basketball standings
	Conf.				Overall
Team	W		L	PCT	W		L	PCT
Dayton †	13	–	3	.813	22	–	10	.688
George Washington	13	–	3	.813	20	–	10	.667
Saint Louis	12	–	4	.750	25	–	9	.735
Saint Joseph's	12	–	4	.750	17	–	15	.531
Fordham	11	–	5	.688	22	–	12	.647
La Salle	9	–	7	.563	17	–	13	.567
Duquesne	8	–	8	.500	18	–	16	.529
VCU	8	–	8	.500	16	–	15	.516
Richmond	7	–	9	.438	13	–	17	.433
George Mason	6	–	10	.375	13	–	17	.433
St. Bonaventure	4	–	12	.250	9	–	20	.310
Davidson	4	–	12	.250	6	–	23	.207
UMass	3	–	13	.188	9	–	21	.300
Rhode Island	2	–	14	.125	6	–	23	.207
† 2017 A10 Tournament winner As of March 20, 2017; Rankings from AP poll

The 2016–17 Dayton Flyers women's basketball team represented the University of Dayton during the 2016–17 NCAA Division I women's basketball season. The Flyers, led by first-year head coach Shauna Green, played their home games at the University of Dayton Arena and are members of the Atlantic 10 Conference. They finished the season 22–10, 13–3 in A-10 play to share the A-10 regular season title with George Washington. They won the A-10 tournament for the first time since 2013 by defeating Duquesne and received an automatic bid to the NCAA women's tournament where they lost to Tennessee in the first round.

On September 7, 2016, it was announced that Jim Jabir will be stepping down as the Flyers' head coach. He finished with a 13-year record of 252–155.

== 2016–17 media ==
=== Dayton Flyers Sports Network ===
The Dayton Flyers Sports Network will broadcast Flyers games off of their athletic website, DaytonFlyers.com, with Shane White on the call. Most home games will also be featured on the A-10 Digital Network. Select games will be televised.

== Roster ==
2016–17 Dayton Flyers women's basketball team
Players
Coaches

Pos.	#	Name	Height	Year	Previous school	Hometown
C	00	Saicha Grant-Allen	6 ft 5 in (1.96 m)	Sr	Glendale Secondary	Hamilton, ON
F	1	Jordan Wilmoth	6 ft 3 in (1.91 m)	Fr	Immaculate Heart Academy	Chestnut Ridge, NY
G	3	Christy Macioce	6 ft 0 in (1.83 m)	Sr	Pickerington North	Pickerington, OH
F	10	Andrijana Cvitkovic	6 ft 3 in (1.91 m)	Sr	Culver Girls Academy	Kraljevica, Croatia
F	11	Alex Harris	6 ft 3 in (1.91 m)	RS Jr	Lorain; Penn State	Lorain, OH
G	12	Jenna Giacone	6 ft 1 in (1.85 m)	Fr	Bethlehem Central	Delmar, NY
G	14	Jenna Burdette	5 ft 8 in (1.73 m)	Jr	Reedsville Eastern	Coolville, OH
G	22	Kelley Austria	6 ft 0 in (1.83 m)	RS Sr	Carroll	Beavercreek, OH
F	23	Maddy Dennis	6 ft 2 in (1.88 m)	So	Mount Lawley	Perth, Western Australia
G	24	Lauren Cannatelli	5 ft 8 in (1.73 m)	So	Lakota West	Cincinnati, OH
G/F	30	Ashleigh Parksinson	6 ft 2 in (1.88 m)	So	Newark Catholic	Newark, OH
G	34	JaVonna Layfield	5 ft 11 in (1.8 m)	Jr	Ballard	Louisville, KY
G	42	Jayla Scaife	5 ft 10 in (1.78 m)	Fr	Muncie Central	Muncie, IN

Head coach

- Shauna Green (Canisius)

Assistant coach(es)

- Simon Harris (NC State)
- Jeff House (Nazareth)
- Kayla Ard (Southeastern Louisiana)

Legend

- (C) Team captain
- (S) Suspended
- (I) Ineligible
- (W) Walk-on
- Injured
- Current redshirt

Roster

== Schedule ==
Date time, TV	Rank^{#}	Opponent^{#}	Result	Record	Site (attendance) city, state
Exhibition
11/06/2016*; 2:00 pm		Grand Valley State	W 74–48		UD Arena (826); Dayton, OH
Regular season
11/13/2016*; 2:00 pm, SPCSN		Quinnipiac	L 60–63	0–1	UD Arena (1,786); Dayton, OH
11/16/2016*; 7:00 pm		at Wisconsin	W 83–64	1–1	Kohl Center (2,944); Madison, WI
11/19/2016*; 12:00 pm		at Princeton	W 62–56 ^{OT}	2–1	Jadwin Gymnasium (518); Princeton, NJ
11/22/2016*; 7:00 pm, SNY		at No. 2 Connecticut	L 65–98	2–2	Gampel Pavilion (6,443); Storrs, CT
11/25/2016*; 1:00 pm		vs. Georgia Tech; Junkanoo Jam Freeport Division semifinals	L 68–81	2–3	St. George HS Gymnasium (326); Freeport, BAH
11/26/2016*; 4:15 pm		vs. Creighton; Junkanoo Jam Freeport Division 3rd place game	L 53–56	2–4	St. George HS Gymnasium (456); Freeport, BAH
12/02/2016*; 7:00 pm		Morgan State	W 61–42	3–4	UD Arena (1,495); Dayton, OH
12/04/2016; 2:00 pm, SPCSN		La Salle	L 51–54	3–5 (0–1)	UD Arena (1,841); Dayton, OH
12/09/2016*; 11:00 am, SPCSN		Toledo	L 72–76	3–6	UD Arena (9,007); Dayton, OH
12/20/2016*; 12:00 pm		vs. Texas A&M; Florida Sunshine Classic	W 74–57	4–6	Worden Arena (319); Winter Haven, FL
12/21/2016*; 1:00 pm		vs. Old Dominion; Florida Sunshine Classic	W 77–69	5–6	Worden Arena (387); Winter Haven, FL
12/28/2016*; 4:30 pm		vs. Liberty; Cavalier Classic	W 82–53	6–6	John Paul Jones Arena (2,338); Charlottesville, VA
12/29/2016*; 7:00 pm, ACC Extra		at Virginia; Cavalier Classic	L 56–77	6–7	John Paul Jones Arena (2,740); Charlottesville, VA
12/31/2016; 2:00 pm		Massachusetts	W 77–65	7–7 (1–1)	UD Arena (1,809); Dayton, OH
01/04/2017; 2:00 pm		at St. Bonaventure	W 62–60	8–7 (2–1)	Reilly Center (482); Olean, NY
01/08/2017; 3:00 pm, CBSSN		George Washington	W 50–48	9–7 (3–1)	UD Arena (2,060); Dayton, OH
01/10/2017; 7:00 pm		Duquesne	W 75–64	10–7 (4–1)	Palumbo Center (485); Pittsburgh, PA
01/15/2017; 12:00 pm, ESPNU		at Saint Louis	W 78–67	11–7 (5–1)	Chaifetz Arena (1,967); St. Louis, MO
01/21/2017; 3:00 pm		Saint Joseph's	W 64–59 ^{OT}	12–7 (6–1)	UD Arena (2,146); Dayton, OH
01/24/2017; 7:00 pm		at George Mason	W 60–48	13–7 (7–1)	EagleBank Arena (546); Fairfax, VA
01/28/2017; 2:00 pm, SPCSN		Rhode Island	W 81–51	14–7 (8–1)	UD Arena (2,225); Dayton, OH
02/01/2017; 7:00 pm		at Davidson	W 68–52	15–7 (9–1)	John M. Belk Arena (351); Davidson, NC
02/04/2017; 2:00 pm		at VCU	W 68–48	16–7 (10–1)	Siegel Center (1,169); Richmond, VA
02/08/2017; 7:00 pm, SPCSN		Richmond	W 55–39	17–7 (11–1)	UD Arena (1,882); Dayton, OH
02/12/2017; 12:00 pm, ESPNU		at George Washington	L 39–52	17–8 (11–2)	Charles E. Smith Center (833); Washington, D.C.
02/15/2017; 7:00 pm		Duquesne	W 66–47	18–8 (12–2)	UD Arena (2,258); Dayton, OH
02/19/2017; 2:00 pm, NBCSN		at Fordham	L 52–66	18–9 (12–3)	Rose Hill Gymnasium (921); Bronx, NY
02/22/2017; 7:00 pm, SPCSN		Saint Louis	W 68–62 ^{OT}	19–9 (13–3)	UD Arena (2,905); Dayton, OH
Atlantic 10 Women's Tournament
03/03/2017; 11:00 am, ASN	(1)	vs. (8) VCU; Quarterfinals	W 77–61	20–9	Richmond Coliseum; Richmond, VA
03/04/2017; 11:00 am, CBSSN	(1)	vs. (4) Saint Louis; Semifinals	W 75–65	21–9	Richmond Coliseum; Richmond, VA
03/05/2017; 11:00 am, ESPNU	(1)	vs. (7) Duquesne; Championship Game	W 70–56	22–9	Richmond Coliseum (3,166); Richmond, VA
NCAA Women's Tournament
03/18/2017*; 1:30 pm, ESPN2	(12 O)	vs. (5 O) Tennessee; First Round	L 57–66	22–10	KFC Yum! Center (5,441); Louisville, KY
*Non-conference game. ^{#}Rankings from AP Poll. (#) Tournament seedings in parentheses. O=Oklahoma City Region. All times are in Eastern Time.

== Rankings ==
Regular season polls
Poll	Pre- Season	Week 2	Week 3	Week 4	Week 5	Week 6	Week 7	Week 8	Week 9	Week 10	Week 11	Week 12	Week 13	Week 14	Week 15	Week 16	Week 17	Week 18	Week 19	Final
AP	NR	NR	NR	NR	NR	NR	NR	NR	NR	NR	NR	NR	NR	NR	RV	NR	NR	RV	RV	N/A
Coaches	NR	NR	NR	NR	NR	NR	NR	NR	NR	NR	NR	NR	NR	NR	NR	NR	NR	NR	NR	

Legend
	Increase in ranking
	Decrease in ranking
	Not ranked previous week
(RV)	Received Votes

== See also ==
- 2016–17 Dayton Flyers men's basketball team
