= 2016–17 Duquesne Dukes women's basketball team =

Intercollegiate basketball season

2016–17 Duquesne Dukes women's basketball

WNIT, First Round
- Conference: Atlantic 10 Conference
- Record: 18–16 (8–8 A-10)
- Head coach: Dan Burt (4th season)
- Assistant coaches: Matt Schmidt; Rachel Wojdowski; Cherie Lea
- Home arena: Palumbo Center

2016–17 Atlantic 10 women's basketball standings
	Conf.				Overall
Team	W		L	PCT	W		L	PCT
Dayton †	13	–	3	.813	22	–	10	.688
George Washington	13	–	3	.813	20	–	10	.667
Saint Louis	12	–	4	.750	25	–	9	.735
Saint Joseph's	12	–	4	.750	17	–	15	.531
Fordham	11	–	5	.688	22	–	12	.647
La Salle	9	–	7	.563	17	–	13	.567
Duquesne	8	–	8	.500	18	–	16	.529
VCU	8	–	8	.500	16	–	15	.516
Richmond	7	–	9	.438	13	–	17	.433
George Mason	6	–	10	.375	13	–	17	.433
St. Bonaventure	4	–	12	.250	9	–	20	.310
Davidson	4	–	12	.250	6	–	23	.207
UMass	3	–	13	.188	9	–	21	.300
Rhode Island	2	–	14	.125	6	–	23	.207
† 2017 A10 Tournament winner As of March 20, 2017; Rankings from AP poll

The 2016–17 Duquesne Dukes women's basketball team represented Duquesne University during the 2016–17 NCAA Division I women's basketball season. The Dukes, led by fourth year head coach Dan Burt, played their home games at the Palumbo Center as members of the Atlantic 10 Conference. They finished the season 18–16, 8–8 in A-10 play to finish in a tie for seventh place. They advanced to the championship game of the A-10 women's tournament where they lost to Dayton. They were invited to the Women's National Invitation Tournament where they lost to Drexel in the first round.

== 2016–17 media ==
=== Duquesne Dukes Sports Network ===
Alex Panormios and Tad Maurey provide the call for home games on A-10 Digital Network. Select games will be televised.

== Roster ==
2016–17 Duquesne Dukes women's basketball team
Players
Coaches

Pos.	#	Name	Height	Year	Previous school	Hometown
G	1	Nina Aho	5 ft 10 in (1.78 m)	Fr	Veres Palne Gimnazium	Budapest, Hungary
G	2	Chassidy Omogrosso	5 ft 6 in (1.68 m)	So	Blackhawk	Beaver Falls, PA
G/F	10	Paige Cannon	6 ft 1 in (1.85 m)	So	Johnstown-Monroe	Johnstown, OH
G	11	Halle Bovel	5 ft 11 in (1.8 m)	Fr	St. Mary's	Hamilton, ON
G	12	Anie-Pier Samson	6 ft 2 in (1.88 m)	Fr	Seminaire Ste-Trinite	Saint-Bruno-de-Montarville, QC
G	13	Juca Vojinovic	5 ft 10 in (1.78 m)	So	Sportska Gimnazija Beograd	Belgrade, Serbia
F	14	Eniko Kuttor	6 ft 1 in (1.85 m)	So	Dániel Berzsenyi Evangélikus	Budapest, Hungary
F	15	Amadea Szamosi	6 ft 3 in (1.91 m)	Sr	Ciszterci Rend Pesi Nagy Lajos Gimnaziuma	Pécs, Hungary
G	21	Erin Waskowiak	5 ft 11 in (1.8 m)	Jr	Bishop Canevin	Pittsburgh, PA
G	22	Conor Richardson	5 ft 10 in (1.78 m)	So	Carlynton	Pittsburgh, PA
G	24	Kiersten Elliott	5 ft 11 in (1.8 m)	Fr	Vincentian Academy	Glenshaw, PA
G/F	42	Kadri-Ann Lass	6 ft 3 in (1.91 m)	Fr	Audentese Spordigumnaasium	Tallinn, Estonia
F	43	Judith Sole	6 ft 3 in (1.91 m)	RS Sr	IES Joaquim Blume; Robert Morris	Igualada, Spain
F	54	Angela Staffileno	6 ft 2 in (1.88 m)	Jr	Brooke	Wellsburg, WV
G	55	Brianna Thomas	6 ft 0 in (1.83 m)	Sr	Notre Dame	Ajax, ON

Head coach

- Dan Burt (West Liberty State)

Assistant coach(es)

- Eddie Benton (Vermont)
- Matt Schmidt (West Liberty State)
- Rachel Wojdowski (NYU)

Legend

- (C) Team captain
- (S) Suspended
- (I) Ineligible
- (W) Walk-on
- Injured
- Current redshirt

Roster

== Schedule ==
Date time, TV	Rank^{#}	Opponent^{#}	Result	Record	Site (attendance) city, state
Regular season
11/11/2016*; 12:00 pm		at No. 7 Ohio State	L 69–89	0–1	St. John Arena (3,434); Columbus, OH
11/13/2016*; 2:00 pm		Lehigh	W 63–49	1–1	Palumbo Center (553); Pittsburgh, PA
11/17/2016*; 7:00 pm, ESPN3		at St. John's	W 71–65	2–1	Carnesecca Arena (637); Queens, NY
11/19/2016*; 2:00 pm, ESPN3		at Iona	W 62–58	3–1	Hynes Athletic Center (700); New Rochelle, NY
11/22/2016*; 1:00 pm		Buffalo	L 69–71	3–2	Palumbo Center (385); Pittsburgh, PA
11/25/2016*; 6:15 pm		vs. Western Carolina; Cal Classic semifinals	W 65–50	4–2	Haas Pavilion; Berkeley, CA
11/26/2016*; 6:15 pm		at California; Cal Classic championship	L 66–88	4–3	Haas Pavilion (1,358); Berkeley, CA
12/01/2016; 7:00 pm		at Fordham	L 51–64	4–4 (0–1)	Rose Hill Gymnasium (297); Bronx, NY
12/03/2016*; 1:00 pm, ESPN3		at Ohio	L 46–64	4–5	Convocation Center (3,577); Athens, OH
12/06/2016*; 5:00 pm		Charlotte	L 63–77	4–6	Palumbo Center (734); Pittsburgh, PA
12/11/2016*; 2:00 pm		Lafayette	W 67–52	5–6	Palumbo Center (254); Pittsburgh, PA
12/17/2016*; 5:00 pm		at Akron	W 67–57	6–6	James A. Rhodes Arena (974); Akron, OH
12/21/2016*; 7:00 pm		No. 4 Maryland	L 57–77	6–7	Palumbo Center (1,288); Pittsburgh, PA
12/29/2016*; 2:00 pm		Pittsburgh; City Game	W 63–54	7–7	Palumbo Center (1,724); Pittsburgh, PA
01/01/2017; 1:00 pm, CBSSN		George Washington	L 40–75	7–8 (0–2)	Palumbo Center (537); Pittsburgh, PA
01/05/2017; 7:00 pm		at La Salle	W 76–68	8–8 (1–2)	Tom Gola Arena (193); Philadelphia, PA
01/07/2017; 2:00 pm		Davidson	W 73–51	9–8 (2–2)	Palumbo Center (485); Pittsburgh, PA
01/10/2017; 7:00 pm		Dayton	L 64–75	9–9 (2–3)	Palumbo Center (485); Pittsburgh, PA
01/15/2017; 12:00 pm, CBSSN		at Massachusetts	L 67–75	9–10 (2–4)	Mullins Center (1,006); Amherst, MA
01/18/2017; 7:00 pm		Saint Louis	W 94–65	10–10 (3–4)	Palumbo Center (576); Pittsburgh, PA
01/21/2017; 4:00 pm		at St. Bonaventure	L 56–69	10–11 (3–5)	Reilly Center (904); Olean, NY
01/25/2017; 7:00 pm		Richmond	W 73–61	11–11 (4–5)	Palumbo Center (777); Pittsburgh, PA
01/29/2017; 5:00 pm, ASN		at George Washington	W 73–63	12–11 (5–5)	Charles E. Smith Center (1,068); Washington, D.C.
02/01/2017; 7:00 pm		at Saint Joseph's	L 58–60	12–12 (5–6)	Hagan Arena (586); Pittsburgh, PA
02/04/2017; 3:00 pm, ASN		George Mason	W 76–57	13–12 (6–6)	Palumbo Center (821); Pittsburgh, PA
02/12/2017; 3:00 pm, ASN		VCU	W 70–51	14–12 (7–6)	Palumbo Center (964); Pittsburgh, PA
02/15/2017; 7:00 pm		at Dayton	L 47–66	14–13 (7–7)	UD Arena (2,258); Dayton, OH
02/18/2017; 2:00 pm		at Rhode Island	L 69–71	14–14 (7–8)	Ryan Center (497); Kingston, RI
02/21/2017; 4:00 pm		at St. Bonaventure	W 83–61	15–14 (8–8)	Palumbo Center (657); Pittsburgh, PA
Atlantic 10 Tournament
02/25/2017; 2:00 pm		George Mason; First Round	W 66–55	16–14	Palumbo Center (471); Pittsburgh, PA
03/03/2017; 4:30 pm, ASN		vs. George Washington; Quarterfinals	W 62–58	17–14	Richmond Coliseum; Richmond, VA
03/04/2017; 1:30 pm, CBSSN		vs. Saint Joseph's; Semifinals	W 78–63	18–14	Richmond Coliseum (1,689); Richmond, VA
03/05/2017; 11:00 am, ESPNU		vs. Dayton; Championship Game	L 56–70	18–15	Richmond Coliseum (3,166); Richmond, VA
WNIT
03/17/2017*; 7:00 pm		at Drexel; First Round	L 47–70	18–16	Daskalakis Athletic Center (417); Philadelphia, PA
*Non-conference game. ^{#}Rankings from AP Poll. (#) Tournament seedings in parentheses. All times are in Eastern Time.

== Rankings ==
2016–17 NCAA Division I women's basketball rankings

Regular season polls
Poll	Pre- Season	Week 2	Week 3	Week 4	Week 5	Week 6	Week 7	Week 8	Week 9	Week 10	Week 11	Week 12	Week 13	Week 14	Week 15	Week 16	Week 17	Week 18	Week 19	Final
AP																				N/A
Coaches	RV																			

Legend
	Increase in ranking
	Decrease in ranking
	No change
(RV)	Received votes
(NR)	Not ranked

== See also ==
- 2016–17 Duquesne Dukes men's basketball team
