= 2017 Atlantic 10 women's basketball tournament =

- Classification: Division I
- Season: 2016–17
- Teams: 14
- Site: campus sites
- Finals site: Richmond Coliseum; Richmond, VA
- Champions: Dayton (2nd title)
- Winning coach: Shauna Green (1st title)
- MVP: Jenna Burdette (Dayton)
- Attendance: 11,138
- Television: A10 Digital, ASN, CBSSN, ESPNU

2016–17 Atlantic 10 women's basketball standings
	Conf.				Overall
Team	W		L	PCT	W		L	PCT
Dayton †	13	–	3	.813	22	–	10	.688
George Washington	13	–	3	.813	20	–	10	.667
Saint Louis	12	–	4	.750	25	–	9	.735
Saint Joseph's	12	–	4	.750	17	–	15	.531
Fordham	11	–	5	.688	22	–	12	.647
La Salle	9	–	7	.563	17	–	13	.567
Duquesne	8	–	8	.500	18	–	16	.529
VCU	8	–	8	.500	16	–	15	.516
Richmond	7	–	9	.438	13	–	17	.433
George Mason	6	–	10	.375	13	–	17	.433
St. Bonaventure	4	–	12	.250	9	–	20	.310
Davidson	4	–	12	.250	6	–	23	.207
UMass	3	–	13	.188	9	–	21	.300
Rhode Island	2	–	14	.125	6	–	23	.207
† 2017 A10 Tournament winner As of March 20, 2017; Rankings from AP poll

The 2017 Atlantic 10 women's basketball tournament was a postseason tournament that played at campus sites on February 25 and 26 for the first round and the quarterfinals; the semifinals and championship game were held on March 3–5 at the Richmond Coliseum in Richmond, Virginia. Dayton won their second A-10 tournament title and earn an automatic bid to the NCAA women's tournament.

== Seeds ==
Teams are seeded by record within the conference, with a tiebreaker system to seed teams with identical conference records.

Seed	School	Conf	Overall	Tiebreaker
#1	Dayton	13–3	19–9	1–1 vs. GW, 3–0 vs. Saint Joseph's/Saint Louis
#2	George Washington	13–3	20–8	1–1 vs. DAY, 1–1 vs. Saint Joseph's/Saint Louis
#3	Saint Joseph's	12–4	15–13	1–0 vs. Saint Louis
#4	Saint Louis	12–4	22–7	0–1 vs. Saint Joe's
#5	Fordham	11–5	20–10	
#6	La Salle	9–7	16–12	
#7	Duquesne	8–8	15–14	1–0 vs. VCU
#8	VCU	8–8	15–14	0–1 vs. Duquesne
#9	Richmond	7–9	13–16	
#10	George Mason	6–10	13–16	
#11	St. Bonaventure	4–12	9–19	1–0 vs. Davidson
#12	Davidson	4–12	6–22	0–1 vs. St. Bonaventure
#13	UMass	3–13	9–20	
#14	Rhode Island	2–14	6–22	

== Schedule ==
Session	Game	Time*	Matchup^{#}	Television	Attendance
First round - Saturday, February 25
1	1	Noon	#6 La Salle 73, #11 St. Bonaventure 70	A10 Net	407
1	2	2:00 PM	#3 Saint Joseph's 77, #14 Rhode Island 51	A10 Net	781
1	3	2:00 PM	#7 Duquesne 66, #10 George Mason 55	A10 Net	471
First round - Sunday, February 26
2	4	1:00 PM	#8 VCU 72, #9 Richmond 64	A10 Net	530
2	5	2:00 PM	#5 Fordham 62, #12 Davidson 54	A10 Net	890
2	6	3:00 PM	#4 Saint Louis 91, #13 Massachusetts 51	A10 Net	573
Quarterfinals - Friday, March 3
3	7	11:00 am	#1 Dayton 77, vs. #8 VCU 61	ASN	2,631
3	8	2:00 pm	#4 Saint Louis 68, vs. #5 Fordham 58	ASN	2,631
4	9	4:30 pm	#2 George Washington 58, vs. #7 Duquesne 62	ASN	2,631
4	10	7:00 pm	#3 Saint Joseph's 66, vs. #6 La Salle 48	ASN	2,631
Semifinals - Saturday, March 4
5	11	11:00 am	#1 Dayton 75 vs. #4 Saint Louis 65	CBSSN	1,689
5	12	1:30 pm	#7 Duquesne 78 vs. #3 Saint Joseph's 63	CBSSN	1,689
Championship - Sunday, March 5
6	13	12:00 pm	#1 Dayton 70 vs. #7 Duquesne 56	ESPNU	3,166

*Game times in Eastern Time. #Rankings denote tournament seeding.

== Bracket ==
First round campus sites February 25–26
8	VCU	72
9	Richmond	64
5	Fordham	62
12	Davidson	54
4	Saint Louis	91
13	UMass	51
6	La Salle	73
11	St. Bonaventure	70
3	Saint Joseph's	77
14	Rhode Island	51
7	Duquesne	66
10	George Mason	55

Quarterfinals; Richmond Coliseum; March 3
1	Dayton	77
8	VCU	61
5	Fordham	58
4	Saint Louis	68
6	La Salle	48
3	Saint Joseph's	66
7	Duquesne	62
2	George Washington	58

Semifinals; Richmond Coliseum; March 4
1	Dayton	75
4	Saint Louis	65
3	Saint Joseph's	63
7	Duquesne	78

Championship; Richmond Coliseum; March 5
1	Dayton	70
7	Duquesne	56

== See also ==
2017 Atlantic 10 men's basketball tournament
