= 2016–17 Saint Joseph's Hawks women's basketball team =

Intercollegiate basketball season

2016–17 Saint Joseph's Hawks women's basketball
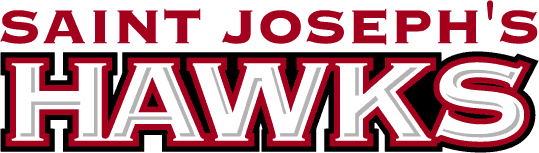

WNIT, First Round
- Conference: Atlantic 10 Conference
- Record: 17–15 (12–4 A-10)
- Head coach: Cindy Griffin (16th season)
- Assistant coaches: Susan Moran; John Hampton; Stephanie McCaffrey
- Home arena: Hagan Arena

2016–17 Atlantic 10 women's basketball standings
	Conf.				Overall
Team	W		L	PCT	W		L	PCT
Dayton †	13	–	3	.813	22	–	10	.688
George Washington	13	–	3	.813	20	–	10	.667
Saint Louis	12	–	4	.750	25	–	9	.735
Saint Joseph's	12	–	4	.750	17	–	15	.531
Fordham	11	–	5	.688	22	–	12	.647
La Salle	9	–	7	.563	17	–	13	.567
Duquesne	8	–	8	.500	18	–	16	.529
VCU	8	–	8	.500	16	–	15	.516
Richmond	7	–	9	.438	13	–	17	.433
George Mason	6	–	10	.375	13	–	17	.433
St. Bonaventure	4	–	12	.250	9	–	20	.310
Davidson	4	–	12	.250	6	–	23	.207
UMass	3	–	13	.188	9	–	21	.300
Rhode Island	2	–	14	.125	6	–	23	.207
† 2017 A10 Tournament winner As of March 20, 2017; Rankings from AP poll

The 2016–17 Saint Joseph's Hawks women's basketball team represented the Saint Joseph's University during the 2016–17 NCAA Division I women's basketball season. The Hawks, led by sixteenth year head coach Cindy Griffin, played their home games at Hagan Arena and were members of the Atlantic 10 Conference. They finished the season 17–15, 12–4 in A-10 play to finish in a tie for fourth place. They advanced to the semifinals of the A-10 women's tournament, where they lost to Duquesne. They were invited to the Women's National Invitation Tournament, where they lost to Virginia in the first round.

== 2016–17 media ==
All non-televised Hawks home games will air on the A-10 Digital Network. All Hawks games will be streamed via the Saint Joseph's Sports Network on sjuhawks.com.

== Roster ==
2016–17 Saint Joseph's Hawks women's basketball team
Players
Coaches

Pos.	#	Name	Height	Year	Previous school	Hometown
G/F	1	Katie Armstrong	6 ft 2 in (1.88 m)	Fr	Perkiomen Valley	Collegeville, PA
G	2	Mackenzie Rule	5 ft 6 in (1.68 m)	Sr	Cardinal O'Hara	West Chester, PA
G	3	Nailah Delinois	5 ft 9 in (1.75 m)	Fr	Northeast	Sunrise, FL
G	4	Kristalyn Baisden	5 ft 10 in (1.78 m)	So	Berkshire School	East Hartford, CT
G	11	Avery Marz	5 ft 7 in (1.7 m)	RS So	Wilson West Lawn	Sinking Springs, PA
G	12	Alyssa Monaghan	5 ft 5 in (1.65 m)	So	Bonner Prendergast	Drexel Hill, PA
G	20	Jazmin Horne	5 ft 7 in (1.7 m)	Sr	Franklin; Eastern Arizona College	Seattle, WA
F	23	Whisper Fisher (W) (redshirt)	6 ft 2 in (1.88 m)	So	Owings Mills; Loyola (MD)	Owings Mills, MD
G	30	Sarah Veilleux	6 ft 0 in (1.83 m)	RS So	RHAM	Hebron, CT
G	31	Jaryn Garner	5 ft 7 in (1.7 m)	RS Jr	Germantown Academy; Virginia	Sewell, NJ
G	32	Chelsea Woods	6 ft 0 in (1.83 m)	Jr	Freire Charter	Philadelphia, PA
F	33	Adashia Franklyn	6 ft 1 in (1.85 m)	Jr	West Chester Bayard Rustin	West Chester, PA
F	34	Amanda Fioravanti	6 ft 1 in (1.85 m)	RS Jr	Our Lady of Good Counsel	Frederick, MD
F	35	Michala Clay	6 ft 0 in (1.83 m)	So	Roland Park Country School	Baltimore, MD
F	40	Candace Belvedere	6 ft 2 in (1.88 m)	Jr	Kellenberg Memorial	Merrick, NY

Head coach

- Cindy Griffin (Saint Joseph's)

Assistant coach(es)

- Susan Moran (Saint Joseph's)
- John Hampton (Mansfield)
- Stephanie McCaffrey (Saint Joseph's)

Legend

- (C) Team captain
- (S) Suspended
- (I) Ineligible
- (W) Walk-on
- Injured
- Current redshirt

Roster

== Schedule ==
Date time, TV	Rank^{#}	Opponent^{#}	Result	Record	Site (attendance) city, state
Non-conference regular season
11/11/2016*; 7:00 pm		Temple; Rivalry	L 70–86	0–1	Hagan Arena (934); Philadelphia, PA
11/13/2016*; 2:00 pm		Bucknell	L 61–64	0–2	Hagan Arena (743); Philadelphia, PA
11/16/2016*; 7:00 pm		at Iona	L 57–58	0–3	Hynes Athletic Center (777); New Rochelle, NY
11/22/2016*; 7:00 pm, ESPN3		at Penn	W 57–53	1–3	Palestra (503); Philadelphia, PA
11/25/2016*; 6:30 pm		vs. BYU; UNM Thanksgiving Tournament semifinals	L 56–71	1–4	The Pit; Albuquerque, NM
11/26/2016*; 4:30 pm		at New Mexico; UNM Thanksgiving Tournament 3rd place game	W 79–67	2–4	The Pit (3,592); Albuquerque, NM
12/03/2016*; 4:00 pm		Villanova; Holy War	L 54–62	2–5	Hagan Arena (1,243); Philadelphia, PA
12/09/2016*; 7:00 pm		at Central Michigan	L 71–73 ^{OT}	2–6	McGuirk Arena (1,348); Mount Pleasant, MI
12/13/2016*; 7:00 pm		NJIT	W 75–36	3–6	Hagan Arena (207); Philadelphia, PA
12/18/2016*; 2:00 pm		at Drexel	L 49–60	3–7	Daskalakis Athletic Center (895); Philadelphia, PA
12/22/2016*; 5:00 pm		Hofstra	L 64–75	3–8	Hagan Arena (3,411); Philadelphia, PA
12/28/2016*; 7:00 pm		James Madison	L 72–85	3–9	Hagan Arena (923); Philadelphia, PA
Atlantic 10 regular season
12/31/2016; 2:00 pm		at Richmond	L 52–70	3–10 (0–1)	Robins Center (564); Richmond, VA
01/04/2017; 7:00 pm		at George Washington	L 44–53	3–11 (0–2)	Charles E. Smith Center (766); Washington, D.C.
01/07/2017; 2:00 pm		Massachusetts	W 81–50	4–11 (1–2)	Hagan Arena (843); Philadelphia, PA
01/11/2017; 11:30 am		VCU	W 64–58	5–11 (2–2)	Hagan Arena (1,462); Philadelphia, PA
01/14/2017; 1:00 pm		at La Salle	W 75–55	6–11 (3–2)	Tom Gola Arena (307); Philadelphia, PA
01/18/2017; 7:00 pm		Fordham	W 47–44	7–11 (4–2)	Hagan Arena (914); Philadelphia, PA
01/21/2017; 3:00 pm		at Dayton	L 59–64 ^{OT}	7–12 (4–3)	UD Arena (2,146); Dayton, OH
01/25/2017; 11:00 am		at Rhode Island	W 75–49	8–12 (5–3)	Ryan Center (853); Kingston, RI
01/29/2017; 3:00 pm, ASN		St. Bonaventure	W 70–53	9–12 (6–3)	Hagan Arena (1,342); Philadelphia, PA
02/01/2017; 7:00 pm		Duquesne	W 60–58	10–12 (7–3)	Hagan Arena (586); Philadelphia, PA
02/05/2017; 4:00 pm, CBSSN		at Saint Louis	W 66–63	11–12 (8–3)	Chaifetz Arena (926); St. Louis, MO
02/09/2017; 7:00 pm		at Fordham	L 39–44	11–13 (8–4)	Rose Hill Gymnasium (403); Bronx, NY
02/12/2017; 2:00 pm		La Salle	W 67–58	12–13 (9–4)	Hagan Arena (751); Philadelphia, PA
02/15/2017; 6:00 pm		at VCU	W 80–70	13–13 (10–4)	Siegel Center (677); Richmond, VA
02/18/2017; 2:00 pm		Davidson	W 69–54	14–13 (11–4)	Hagan Arena (553); Philadelphia, PA
02/21/2017; 7:00 pm		George Mason	W 57–53 ^{OT}	15–13 (12–4)	Hagan Arena (543); Philadelphia, PA
Atlantic 10 Women's Tournament
02/25/2017; 2:00 pm		Rhode Island; First Round	W 77–51	16–13	Hagan Arena (781); Philadelphia, PA
03/03/2017; 7:00 pm, ASN		vs. La Salle; Quarterfinals	W 66–48	17–13	Richmond Coliseum (3,601); Richmond, VA
03/04/2017; 1:30 pm, CBSSN		vs. Duquesne; Semifinals	L 63–78	17–14	Richmond Coliseum (1,689); Richmond, VA
WNIT
03/17/2017*; 7:00 pm		Virginia; First Round	L 56–62	17–15	Hagan Arena (781); Philadelphia, PA
*Non-conference game. ^{#}Rankings from AP Poll. (#) Tournament seedings in parentheses. All times are in Eastern Time.

== Rankings ==
2016–17 NCAA Division I women's basketball rankings

Regular season polls
Poll	Pre- Season	Week 2	Week 3	Week 4	Week 5	Week 6	Week 7	Week 8	Week 9	Week 10	Week 11	Week 12	Week 13	Week 14	Week 15	Week 16	Week 17	Week 18	Final
AP																			
Coaches																			

Legend
	Increase in ranking
	Decrease in ranking
	No change
(RV)	Received votes
(NR)	Not ranked

== See also ==
- 2016–17 Saint Joseph's Hawks men's basketball team
