= 2016–17 Rhode Island Rams women's basketball team =

Intercollegiate basketball season

2016–17 Rhode Island Rams women's basketball
- Conference: Atlantic 10 Conference
- Record: 6–23 (2–14 A-10)
- Head coach: Daynia La-Force (3rd season)
- Assistant coaches: Tom Blake; Marcus Reilly; Stephanie Tobey
- Home arena: Ryan Center

2016–17 Atlantic 10 women's basketball standings
	Conf.				Overall
Team	W		L	PCT	W		L	PCT
Dayton †	13	–	3	.813	22	–	10	.688
George Washington	13	–	3	.813	20	–	10	.667
Saint Louis	12	–	4	.750	25	–	9	.735
Saint Joseph's	12	–	4	.750	17	–	15	.531
Fordham	11	–	5	.688	22	–	12	.647
La Salle	9	–	7	.563	17	–	13	.567
Duquesne	8	–	8	.500	18	–	16	.529
VCU	8	–	8	.500	16	–	15	.516
Richmond	7	–	9	.438	13	–	17	.433
George Mason	6	–	10	.375	13	–	17	.433
St. Bonaventure	4	–	12	.250	9	–	20	.310
Davidson	4	–	12	.250	6	–	23	.207
UMass	3	–	13	.188	9	–	21	.300
Rhode Island	2	–	14	.125	6	–	23	.207
† 2017 A10 Tournament winner As of March 20, 2017; Rankings from AP poll

The 2016–17 Rhode Island Rams women's basketball team represented the University of Rhode Island during the 2016–17 NCAA Division I women's basketball season. The Rams, led by third year head coach Daynia La-Force. The Rams were members of the Atlantic 10 Conference and play their home games at the Ryan Center. They finished the season 6–24, 2–14 in A-10 to finish in last place. They lost in the first round of the A-10 women's tournament to Saint Joseph's.

== 2016–17 media ==
All Rams home games and most non-televised conference road games televised were shown on the A-10 Digital Network.

== Roster ==
2016–17 Rhode Island Rams women's basketball team
Players
Coaches

Pos.	#	Name	Height	Year	Previous school	Hometown
G	0	Ednaija Lassiter	5 ft 7 in (1.7 m)	Fr	Newton North	Quincy, MA
G	1	Elemy Colome (I) (redshirt)	5 ft 7 in (1.7 m)	So	Proctor Academy; James Madison	Lawrence, MA
F	2	Jalissa Ross	6 ft 2 in (1.88 m)	So	Fenway	Roxbury, MA
G	3	Charise Wilson	5 ft 5 in (1.65 m)	Jr	St. Anthony's	West Babylon, NY
G	4	Laura Perez	5 ft 8 in (1.73 m)	So	CETYS Universidad	Baja California, Mexico
G	12	Morgan Johnson	5 ft 10 in (1.78 m)	RS Jr	Keystone	Knox, PA
G	20	Dominique Ward	5 ft 11 in (1.8 m)	Jr	Rancocas Valley	Trenton, NJ
G	22	Dempsey Cooper	5 ft 9 in (1.75 m)	Sr	Germantown Academy	Doylestown, PA
C	25	Gabrielle Green	6 ft 2 in (1.88 m)	Fr	Mt. Hebron	Ellicott City, MD
F	30	Tyler Raysor	6 ft 3 in (1.91 m)	Jr	Haddon Heights	Lawnside, NJ
G	31	Anari Johnson	6 ft 1 in (1.85 m)	So	Dallastown Area	Red Lion, PA
C	32	Nicole Jorgensen	6 ft 5 in (1.96 m)	Fr	Quincy	Quincy, MA
C	34	Dina Motrechuk	6 ft 5 in (1.96 m)	So	Moore Catholic	Staten Island, NY
F	52	Meghan Oberg	6 ft 3 in (1.91 m)	Fr	Islip	Islip, NY

Head coach

- Daynia La-Force (Georgetown)

Assistant coach(es)

- Tom Blake (Connecticut)
- Marcus Reilly (Trinity (CT))
- Stephanie Tobey (Bryant)

Legend

- (C) Team captain
- (S) Suspended
- (I) Ineligible
- (W) Walk-on
- Injured
- Current redshirt

Roster

== Schedule ==
Date time, TV	Rank^{#}	Opponent^{#}	Result	Record	Site (attendance) city, state
Exhibition
11/07/2016*; 7:00 pm		Bridgeport	W 61–43		Ryan Center (467); Kingston, RI
Non-conference regular season
11/11/2016*; 3:00 pm		at No. 14 Syracuse	L 49–95	0–1	Carrier Dome (1,230); Syracuse, NY
11/13/2016*; 2:00 pm		Marist	W 82–61	1–1	Ryan Center (519); Kingston, RI
11/15/2016*; 5:30 pm		at Toledo	L 50–65	1–2	Savage Arena (3,189); Toledo, OH
11/18/2016*; 7:00 pm		Penn	L 43–75	1–3	Ryan Center (329); Kingston, RI
11/20/2016*; 2:00 pm		Samford	W 78–63	2–3	Ryan Center (313); Kingston, RI
11/23/2016*; 1:00 pm		at Fairfield	W 72–65	3–3	Alumni Hall (229); Fairfield, CT
11/29/2016*; 7:00 pm		at UMass Lowell	W 64–57	4–3	Costello Athletic Center (521); Lowell, MA
12/03/2016*; 3:00 pm		at Brown; Ocean State Tip-Off semifinals	L 65–76	4–4	Pizzitola Sports Center (485); Providence, RI
12/04/2016*; 1:00 pm		vs. Bryant; Ocean State Tip-Off 3rd place game	L 56–62	4–5	Pizzitola Sports Center; Providence, RI
12/08/2016*; 7:00 pm		Michigan State	L 48–85	4–6	Ryan Center (205); Kingston, RI
12/11/2016*; 4:00 pm		at Kansas	L 36–72	4–7	Allen Fieldhouse (1,995); Lawrence, KS
12/18/2016*; 4:00 pm		Dartmouth	L 52–62	4–8	Ryan Center (399); Kingston, RI
Atlantic 10 regular season
12/28/2016; 4:00 pm		at St. Bonaventure	L 69–78	4–9 (0–1)	Reilly Center (714); Olean, NY
01/01/2017; 2:00 pm		Fordham	L 69–74	4–10 (0–2)	Ryan Center (485); Kingston, RI
01/04/2017; 2:00 pm		at Massachusetts	L 67–68	4–11 (0–3)	Mullins Center (413); Amherst, MA
01/09/2017; 2:00 pm, CBSSN		at La Salle	L 51–70	4–12 (0–4)	Tom Gola Arena (343); Philadelphia, PA
01/14/2017; 2:00 pm		Richmond	L 53–58	4–13 (0–5)	Ryan Center (391); Kingston, RI
01/18/2017; 1:00 pm		at VCU	L 57–68	4–14 (0–6)	Siegel Center; Richmond, VA
01/21/2017; 2:00 pm		Saint Louis	L 57–68	4–15 (0–7)	Ryan Center (507); Kingston, RI
01/25/2017; 11:00 am		Saint Joseph's	L 49–75	4–16 (0–8)	Ryan Center (853); Kingston, RI
01/28/2017; 7:00 pm		at Dayton	L 51–81	4–17 (0–9)	UD Arena (2,225); Dayton, OH
02/01/2017; 7:00 pm		La Salle	L 49–58	4–18 (0–10)	Ryan Center (379); Kingston, RI
02/05/2017; 1:00 pm		at Richmond	L 51–67	4–19 (0–11)	Robins Center (586); Richmond, VA
02/08/2017; 7:00 pm		George Washington	L 44–72	4–20 (0–12)	Ryan Center (373); Kingston, RI
02/11/2017; 2:00 pm		at Davidson	L 64–74	4–21 (0–13)	John M. Belk Arena (567); Davidson, NC
02/15/2017; 7:00 pm		at George Mason	L 51–60	4–22 (0–14)	EagleBank Arena (762); Fairfax, VA
02/18/2017; 2:00 pm		Duquesne	W 71–69	5–22 (1–14)	Ryan Center (497); Kingston, RI
02/22/2017; 7:00 pm		Massachusetts	W 53–50	6–22 (2–14)	Ryan Center (449); Kingston, RI
Atlantic 10 Women's Tournament
02/25/2017; 2:00 pm		at Saint Joseph's; First Round	L 51–77	6–23	Hagan Arena (781); Philadelphia, PA
*Non-conference game. ^{#}Rankings from AP Poll. (#) Tournament seedings in parentheses. All times are in Eastern Time.

== Rankings ==
2016–17 NCAA Division I women's basketball rankings

+ Regular season polls	Poll	Pre- Season	Week 2	Week 3	Week 4	Week 5	Week 6	Week 7	Week 8	Week 9	Week 10	Week 11	Week 12	Week 13	Week 14	Week 15	Week 16	Week 17	Week 18	Final
AP																				
Coaches																				

Legend
	Increase in ranking
	Decrease in ranking
	No change
(RV)	Received votes
(NR)	Not ranked

== See also ==
- 2016–17 Rhode Island Rams men's basketball team
