= 2016–17 La Salle Explorers women's basketball team =

Intercollegiate basketball season

2016–17 La Salle Explorers women's basketball
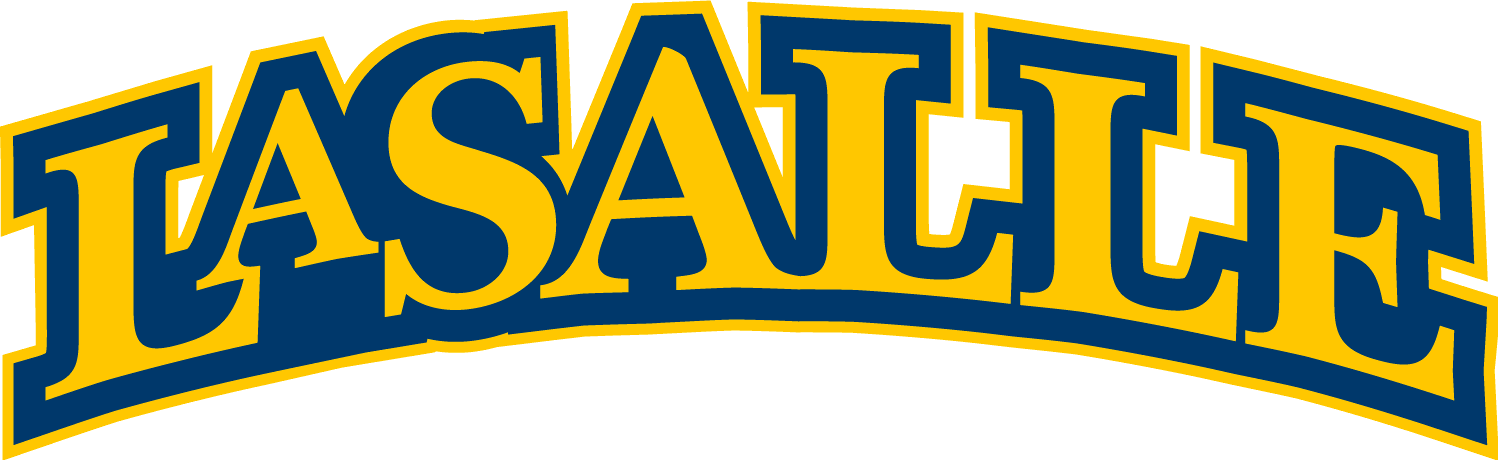
- Conference: Atlantic 10 Conference
- Record: 17–13 (9–7 A-10)
- Head coach: Jeff Williams (7th season)
- Assistant coaches: Morra Gill; Dalila Eshe; Christal Caldwell
- Home arena: Tom Gola Arena

2016–17 Atlantic 10 women's basketball standings
	Conf.				Overall
Team	W		L	PCT	W		L	PCT
Dayton †	13	–	3	.813	22	–	10	.688
George Washington	13	–	3	.813	20	–	10	.667
Saint Louis	12	–	4	.750	25	–	9	.735
Saint Joseph's	12	–	4	.750	17	–	15	.531
Fordham	11	–	5	.688	22	–	12	.647
La Salle	9	–	7	.563	17	–	13	.567
Duquesne	8	–	8	.500	18	–	16	.529
VCU	8	–	8	.500	16	–	15	.516
Richmond	7	–	9	.438	13	–	17	.433
George Mason	6	–	10	.375	13	–	17	.433
St. Bonaventure	4	–	12	.250	9	–	20	.310
Davidson	4	–	12	.250	6	–	23	.207
UMass	3	–	13	.188	9	–	21	.300
Rhode Island	2	–	14	.125	6	–	23	.207
† 2017 A10 Tournament winner As of March 20, 2017; Rankings from AP poll

The 2016–17 La Salle Explorers women's basketball team represented La Salle University during the 2016–17 NCAA Division I women's basketball season. The Explorers, led by sixth year head coach Jeff Williams, played their home games at Tom Gola Arena and are members of the Atlantic 10 Conference. They finished the season 17–13, 9–7 in A-10 play to finish in a tie for sixth place. They advanced to the quarterfinals of the A-10 women's tournament where they lost to Duquesne.

== 2016–17 media ==
=== La Salle Explorers Sports Network ===
Select Explorers games will be broadcast online by the La Salle Portal. The A-10 Digital Network will carry all non-televised Explorers home games and most conference road games.

== Roster ==
2016–17 La Salle Explorers women's basketball team
Players
Coaches

Pos.	#	Name	Height	Year	Previous school	Hometown
G	1	Shaquana Edwards	5 ft 5 in (1.65 m)	Fr	Weaver	Hartford, CT
F/C	5	Amber Wilks	6 ft 3 in (1.91 m)	So	Walnut Hills	Cincinnati, OH
G	11	Jasmine Alston	5 ft 9 in (1.75 m)	Sr	Bishop Loughlin	Long Island City, NY
G/F	12	Iyonna Crenshaw	6 ft 0 in (1.83 m)	Jr	Neptune	Neptune, NJ
F	13	Anemone Scheel	6 ft 1 in (1.85 m)	So	New Hope Christian Academy	Rungsted Kyst, Denmark
G	15	Adreana Miller	5 ft 11 in (1.8 m)	So	Franklin	Somerset, NJ
G/F	21	Amy Griffin	6 ft 1 in (1.85 m)	Jr	Southwest Atlanta Christian	Atlanta, GA
F	22	Deja Bullock	6 ft 0 in (1.83 m)	Sr	Triton	Magnolia, NJ
F/C	25	Shalina Miller	6 ft 2 in (1.88 m)	Fr	Archbishop Prendergast	Philadelphia, PA
F	34	Micahya Owens	5 ft 11 in (1.8 m)	Sr	Willingboro	Willingboro, NJ
C	35	Sofilia Ngwafang	6 ft 4 in (1.93 m)	Fr	Paint Branch	Silver Spring, MD
F	44	Ashanti Freeland	6 ft 3 in (1.91 m)	Jr	Gwynn Park	Brandywine, MD
F	55	Lisa Mintzer	6 ft 4 in (1.93 m)	Sr	Cardinal O'Hara	Havertown, PA

Head coach

- Jeff Williams (Howard)

Assistant coach(es)

- Morra Gill (Dillard)
- Dalila Eshe (Florida)
- Christal Caldwell (West Virginia)

Legend

- (C) Team captain
- (S) Suspended
- (I) Ineligible
- (W) Walk-on
- Injured
- Current redshirt

Roster

== Schedule ==
Date time, TV	Rank^{#}	Opponent^{#}	Result	Record	Site (attendance) city, state
Regular season
11/11/2016*; 7:00 pm		Lafayette	L 49–56	0–1	Tom Gola Arena (310); Philadelphia, PA
11/14/2016*; 5:00 pm		at Temple	L 70–86	0–2	McGonigle Hall (1,081); Philadelphia, PA
11/17/2016*; 7:00 pm		at Rider	L 61–74	0–3	Alumni Gymnaisum (547); Lawrenceville, NJ
11/20/2016*; 1:00 pm		American	W 63–59	1–3	Tom Gola Arena (352); Philadelphia, PA
11/26/2016*; 12:00 pm		vs. Miami (OH); UNCW Hampton Inn Thanksgiving Classic	W 79–70	2–3	Trask Coliseum (428); Wilmington, NC
11/27/2016*; 2:00 pm		at UNC Wilmington; UNCW Hampton Inn Thanksgiving Classic	W 64–48	3–3	Trask Coliseum (397); Wilmington, NC
11/30/2016*; 7:00 pm		at Villanova	L 49–52	3–4	The Pavilion (801); Villanova, PA
12/04/2016; 7:00 pm		at Dayton	W 54–51	4–4 (1–0)	UD Arena (1,841); Dayton, OH
12/07/2016*; 5:30 pm		at Penn	W 58–56 ^{OT}	5–4	Palestra (331); Philadelphia, PA
12/10/2016*; 1:00 pm		Fairfield	W 68–61	6–4	Tom Gola Arena (410); Philadelphia, PA
12/21/2016*; 1:00 pm		Delaware State	W 78–38	7–4	Tom Gola Arena (167); Philadelphia, PA
12/28/2016*; 3:00 pm		UMKC	W 64–59	8–4	Tom Gola Arena (225); Philadelphia, PA
01/01/2017; 1:00 pm		at VCU	L 56–61	8–5 (1–1)	Siegel Center (520); Richmond, VA
01/05/2017; 7:00 pm		Duquesne	L 68–76	8–6 (1–2)	Tom Gola Arena (485); Philadelphia, PA
01/09/2017; 7:00 pm, CBSSN		Rhode Island	W 70–51	9–6 (2–2)	Tom Gola Arena (343); Philadelphia, PA
01/11/2017*; 7:00 pm		Harvard	L 64–66	9–7	Tom Gola Arena (284); Philadelphia, PA
01/14/2017; 1:00 pm		Saint Joseph's	L 55–75	9–8 (2–3)	Tom Gola Arena (307); Philadelphia, PA
01/18/2017; 7:00 pm		at Richmond	W 63–58	10–8 (3–3)	Robins Center (430); Richmond, VA
01/21/2017; 2:00 pm		at Davidson	W 65–58	11–8 (4–3)	John M. Belk Arena (707); Davidson, NC
01/25/2017; 12:00 pm		Massachusetts	W 68–64	12–8 (5–3)	Tom Gola Arena (567); Philadelphia, PA
01/28/2017; 1:00 pm		George Mason	W 59–57	13–8 (6–3)	Tom Gola Arena (324); Philadelphia, PA
02/01/2017; 7:00 pm		at Rhode Island	W 58–49	14–8 (7–3)	Ryan Center (379); Kingston, RI
02/04/2017; 1:00 pm		George Washington	L 65–79	14–9 (7–4)	Tom Gola Arena (346); Philadelphia, PA
02/07/2017; 7:00 pm		at St. Bonaventure	W 57–45	15–9 (8–4)	Reilly Center (819); Olean, NY
02/12/2017; 2:00 pm		at Saint Joseph's	L 58–67	15–10 (8–5)	Hagan Arena (751); Philadelphia, PA
02/15/2017; 7:00 pm		Saint Louis	L 74–79	15–11 (8–6)	Tom Gola Arena (304); Philadelphia, PA
02/18/2017; 3:00 pm		at Massachusetts	W 57–52	16–11 (9–6)	Mullins Center (650); Amherst, MA
02/22/2017; 7:00 pm		Fordham	L 61–66 ^{OT}	16–12 (9–7)	Tom Gola Arena (402); Philadelphia, PA
Atlantic 10 Women's Tournament
02/25/2016; 12:00 pm		St. Bonaventure; First Round	W 73–70	17–12	Tom Gola Arena (407); Philadelphia, PA
03/03/2016; 7:00 pm, ASN		vs. Saint Joseph's; Quarterfinals	L 48–66	17–13	Richmond Coliseum (2,631); Richmond, VA
*Non-conference game. ^{#}Rankings from AP Poll. (#) Tournament seedings in parentheses. All times are in Eastern Time.

== Rankings ==
2016–17 NCAA Division I women's basketball rankings

+ Regular season polls	Poll	Pre- Season	Week 2	Week 3	Week 4	Week 5	Week 6	Week 7	Week 8	Week 9	Week 10	Week 11	Week 12	Week 13	Week 14	Week 15	Week 16	Week 17	Week 18	Final
AP																				
Coaches																				

Legend
	Increase in ranking
	Decrease in ranking
	No change
(RV)	Received votes
(NR)	Not ranked

== See also ==
- 2016–17 La Salle Explorers men's basketball team
