= 2016–17 George Washington Colonials women's basketball team =

Intercollegiate basketball season

2016–17 George Washington Colonials women's basketball

Atlantic 10 regular season co–champions

WNIT, First Round
- Conference: Atlantic 10 Conference
- Record: 20–10 (13–3 A-10)
- Head coach: Jennifer Rizzotti (1st season)
- Assistant coaches: Bill Sullivan; Jackie Smith; Laura Harper
- Home arena: Charles E. Smith Center

2016–17 Atlantic 10 women's basketball standings
	Conf.				Overall
Team	W		L	PCT	W		L	PCT
Dayton †	13	–	3	.813	22	–	10	.688
George Washington	13	–	3	.813	20	–	10	.667
Saint Louis	12	–	4	.750	25	–	9	.735
Saint Joseph's	12	–	4	.750	17	–	15	.531
Fordham	11	–	5	.688	22	–	12	.647
La Salle	9	–	7	.563	17	–	13	.567
Duquesne	8	–	8	.500	18	–	16	.529
VCU	8	–	8	.500	16	–	15	.516
Richmond	7	–	9	.438	13	–	17	.433
George Mason	6	–	10	.375	13	–	17	.433
St. Bonaventure	4	–	12	.250	9	–	20	.310
Davidson	4	–	12	.250	6	–	23	.207
UMass	3	–	13	.188	9	–	21	.300
Rhode Island	2	–	14	.125	6	–	23	.207
† 2017 A10 Tournament winner As of March 20, 2017; Rankings from AP poll

The 2016–17 George Washington Colonials women's basketball team represented George Washington University during the 2016–17 NCAA Division I women's basketball season. The Colonials, led by first year head coach Jennifer Rizzotti, played their home games at Charles E. Smith Center and were members of the Atlantic 10 Conference. They finished the season 20–10, 13–3 in A-10 play to share the A-10 regular season title with Dayton. They lost in the quarterfinals of the A-10 women's tournament to Duquesne. They received an automatic bid to the Women's National Invitation Tournament where they lost to Navy in the first round.

== 2016–17 media ==
WRGW will carry the Colonials games and broadcast them online at GWRadio.com. The A-10 Digital Network will carry all non-televised Colonials home games and most conference road games through RaiseHigh Live.

== Roster ==
2016–17 George Washington Colonials women's basketball team
Players
Coaches

Pos.	#	Name	Height	Year	Previous school	Hometown
F	1	Kelsi Mahoney	6 ft 1 in (1.85 m)	So	Jay M. Robinson	Concord, NC
G	2	Camila Tapias	5 ft 6 in (1.68 m)	Jr	IMG Academy	Bogotá, Colombia
F	3	Caira Washington	6 ft 2 in (1.88 m)	Sr	Georgetown Day School	Brandywine, MD
G	5	Brianna Cummings	5 ft 10 in (1.78 m)	Jr	Greater Atlanta Christian	Lawrenceville, GA
G	12	Harper Birdsong	5 ft 10 in (1.78 m)	Fr	Nansemond-Suffolk Academy	Suffolk, VA
G	13	Shannon Cranshaw	5 ft 9 in (1.75 m)	Sr	Father Lopez	Ormond Beach, FL
G	15	Mia Farmer	5 ft 8 in (1.73 m)	Jr	Cardinal O'Hara	Philadelphia, PA
G	20	Hannah Schaible	5 ft 9 in (1.75 m)	Sr	Dr. Phillips	Orlando, FL
G	21	Mei-Lyn Bautista	5 ft 6 in (1.68 m)	So	St. Mary's	Whitestone, NY
F	22	Jada Matthews	6 ft 0 in (1.83 m)	Jr	Winslow Township	Sicklerville, NJ
F	24	Lexi Martins	6 ft 1 in (1.85 m)	Sr	Irvington; Lehigh	Irvington, NY
C	25	Kelli Prange	6 ft 5 in (1.96 m)	Jr	Damascus	Damascus, MD
G	33	Kendall Bresee	5 ft 11 in (1.8 m)	Fr	Urbana	Frederick, MD

Head coach

- Jennifer Rizzotti (Connecticut)

Assistant coach(es)

- Bill Sullivan (Connecticut)
- Jackie Smith (Hartford)
- Laura Harper (Maryland)

Legend

- (C) Team captain
- (S) Suspended
- (I) Ineligible
- (W) Walk-on
- Injured
- Current redshirt

Roster

== Schedule ==
Date time, TV	Rank^{#}	Opponent^{#}	Result	Record	Site (attendance) city, state
Regular season
11/11/2016*; 7:00 pm		at Georgetown	L 57–72	0–1	McDonough Gymnasium (1,413); Washington, D.C.
11/13/2016*; 12:00 pm		Princeton	W 56–45	1–1	Charles E. Smith Center (1,003); Washington, D.C.
11/16/2016*; 7:00 pm		Coppin State	W 77–46	2–1	Charles E. Smith Center (427); Washington, D.C.
11/20/2016*; 1:00 pm		at Villanova	W 72–69	3–1	The Pavilion (735); Villanova, PA
11/25/2016*; 7:30 pm		vs. No. 11 Syracuse; Gulf Coast Showcase quarterfinals	L 71–74	3–2	Germain Arena; Estero, FL
11/26/2016*; 1:30 pm		vs. Florida Gulf Coast; Gulf Coast Showcase consolation 2nd round	W 76–47	4–2	Germain Arena; Estero, FL
11/27/2016*; 1:30 pm		vs. WKU; Gulf Coast Showcase 5th place game	W 68–49	5–2	Germain Arena; Estero, FL
12/02/2016; 7:00 pm		VCU	W 81–68	6–2 (1–0)	Charles E. Smith Center (764); Washington, D.C.
12/04/2016*; 12:00 pm		Illinois	W 72–56	7–2	Charles E. Smith Center (466); Washington, D.C.
12/07/2016*; 7:00 pm		at American	L 61–66 ^{OT}	7–3	Bender Arena (279); Washington, D.C.
12/11/2016*; 2:00 pm		at South Dakota State	L 55–60	7–4	Frost Arena (1,111); Brookings, SD
12/21/2016*; 7:00 pm		No. 14 Stanford	L 52–71	7–5	Charles E. Smith Center (1,270); Washington, D.C.
12/23/2016*; 12:00 pm		Loyola (MD)	W 74–64	8–5	Charles E. Smith Center (907); Washington, D.C.
01/01/2017; 1:00 pm, CBSSN		at Duquesne	W 75–40	9–5 (2–0)	Palumbo Center (537); Pittsburgh, PA
01/04/2017; 7:00 pm		Saint Joseph's	W 53–44	10–5 (3–0)	Charles E. Smith Center (766); Washington, D.C.
01/08/2017; 3:00 pm, CBSSN		at Dayton	L 48–50	10–6 (3–1)	UD Arena (2,060); Dayton, OH
01/11/2017; 11:00 am		at George Mason	W 79–71 ^{OT}	11–6 (4–1)	EagleBank Arena (465); Fairfax, VA
01/15/2017; 2:00 pm, CBSSN		Davidson	W 76–62	12–6 (5–1)	Charles E. Smith Center (872); Washington, D.C.
01/21/2017; 3:00 pm		at Massachusetts	W 60–54 ^{2OT}	13–6 (6–1)	Mullins Center (903); Amherst, MA
01/26/2017; 7:00 pm		at Saint Louis	L 59–67	13–7 (6–2)	Chaifetz Arena (527); St. Louis, MO
01/29/2017; 5:00 pm, ASN		Duquesne	L 63–73	13–8 (6–3)	Charles E. Smith Center (1,068); Washington, D.C.
02/01/2017; 12:00 pm, NBCSN		Fordham	W 63–46	14–8 (7–3)	Charles E. Smith Center (1,919); Washington, D.C.
02/04/2017; 1:00 pm		at La Salle	W 79–65	15–8 (8–3)	Tom Gola Arena (346); Philadelphia, PA
02/08/2017; 7:00 pm		at Rhode Island	W 72–44	16–8 (9–3)	Ryan Center (373); Kingston, RI
02/12/2017; 12:00 pm, ESPNU		Dayton	W 52–39	17–8 (10–3)	Charles E. Smith Center (833); Washington, D.C.
02/15/2017; 7:00 pm		St. Bonaventure	W 63–57	18–8 (11–3)	Charles E. Smith Center (405); Washington, D.C.
02/18/2017; 2:00 pm		George Mason	W 80–49	19–8 (12–3)	Charles E. Smith Center (1,587); Washington, D.C.
02/22/2017; 7:00 pm		at Richmond	W 63–44	20–8 (13–3)	Robins Center (751); Richmond, VA
Atlantic 10 Women's Tournament
03/03/2017; 4:30 pm, ASN		vs. Duquesne; Quarterfinals	L 58–62	20–9	Richmond Coliseum; Richmond, VA
WNIT
03/17/2017*; 7:00 pm		Navy; First Round	L 51–61 ^{OT}	20–10	Charles E. Smith Center (412); Washington, D.C.
*Non-conference game. ^{#}Rankings from AP Poll. (#) Tournament seedings in parentheses. All times are in Eastern Time.

== Rankings ==
Regular season polls
Poll	Pre- Season	Week 2	Week 3	Week 4	Week 5	Week 6	Week 7	Week 8	Week 9	Week 10	Week 11	Week 12	Week 13	Week 14	Week 15	Week 16	Week 17	Week 18	Week 19	Final
AP	NR	NR	NR	NR	NR	NR	NR	NR	NR	NR	NR	NR	NR	NR	NR	NR	NR	NR	NR	N/A
Coaches	RV	NR	NR	NR	NR	NR	NR	NR	NR	NR	NR	NR	NR	NR	NR	NR	RV	NR	NR	

Legend
	Increase in ranking
	Decrease in ranking
	Not ranked previous week
(RV)	Received Votes

== See also ==
- 2016–17 George Washington Colonials men's basketball team
