= 2016–17 VCU Rams women's basketball team =

Intercollegiate basketball season

2016–17 VCU Rams women's basketball
- Conference: Atlantic 10 Conference
- Record: 16–15 (8–8 A-10)
- Head coach: Beth O'Boyle (3rd season)
- Assistant coaches: Karen Blair; Nerlande Nicolas; Richard Fortune
- Home arena: Stuart C. Siegel Center

2016–17 Atlantic 10 women's basketball standings
	Conf.				Overall
Team	W		L	PCT	W		L	PCT
Dayton †	13	–	3	.813	22	–	10	.688
George Washington	13	–	3	.813	20	–	10	.667
Saint Louis	12	–	4	.750	25	–	9	.735
Saint Joseph's	12	–	4	.750	17	–	15	.531
Fordham	11	–	5	.688	22	–	12	.647
La Salle	9	–	7	.563	17	–	13	.567
Duquesne	8	–	8	.500	18	–	16	.529
VCU	8	–	8	.500	16	–	15	.516
Richmond	7	–	9	.438	13	–	17	.433
George Mason	6	–	10	.375	13	–	17	.433
St. Bonaventure	4	–	12	.250	9	–	20	.310
Davidson	4	–	12	.250	6	–	23	.207
UMass	3	–	13	.188	9	–	21	.300
Rhode Island	2	–	14	.125	6	–	23	.207
† 2017 A10 Tournament winner As of March 20, 2017; Rankings from AP poll

The 2016–17 VCU Rams women's basketball team represented Virginia Commonwealth University during the 2016–17 NCAA Division I women's basketball season. The Rams, led by third year head coach Beth O’Boyle, were members of the Atlantic 10 Conference and played their home games at the Stuart C. Siegel Center. They finished the season 16–15, 8–8 in A-10 play to finish in a tie for seventh place. They advanced to the quarterfinals of the A-10 women's tournament, where they lost to Dayton.

== Roster ==
2016–17 VCU Rams women's basketball team
Players
Coaches

Pos.	#	Name	Height	Year	Previous school	Hometown
G	0	Ashley Pegram	5 ft 8 in (1.73 m)	Sr	Meadowbrook; Chesapeake College	Richmond, Virginia
G	1	Galaisha Goodhope	5 ft 5 in (1.65 m)	RS Sr	Princess Anne; Old Dominion	Norfolk, Virginia
G	3	Nyra Williams	5 ft 5 in (1.65 m)	Fr	Bethel	Hampton, Virginia
G	20	Jailyn Maddox	5 ft 10 in (1.78 m)	Fr	Hoover	Hoover, Alabama
G	21	Ashlee Mitchell	5 ft 7 in (1.7 m)	Sr	Tennessee	Bristol, Tennessee
G	22	Katherine Strong	5 ft 11 in (1.8 m)	So	Bloom	Chicago Heights, Illinois
F	23	Sandra Skinner	6 ft 1 in (1.85 m)	So	George Rogers Clark	Winchester, Kentucky
G	24	Mooriah Rowser	5 ft 9 in (1.75 m)	RS Sr	St. John's College; Memphis	Rockville, Maryland
F	25	Curteeona Brelove	6 ft 2 in (1.88 m)	Jr	Malone	Malone, Florida
C	30	Danielle Hammond	6 ft 4 in (1.93 m)	Fr	Baldwin School	Philadelphia, Pennsylvania
F	32	Bria Gibson	6 ft 1 in (1.85 m)	So	Sanderson	Columbia, Maryland
G	34	Keira Robinson	5 ft 8 in (1.73 m)	Sr	Keenan	Columbia, South Carolina
G	42	Niya Johnson	5 ft 8 in (1.73 m)	Fr	Nazareth	Brooklyn, New York
G/F	44	Camille Calhoun	6 ft 0 in (1.83 m)	RS Jr	Archbishop Spalding	Bowie, Maryland
G	45	Isis Thorpe	5 ft 8 in (1.73 m)	Sr	Reading	Reading, Pennsylvania

Head coach

- Beth O'Boyle (Gettysburg)

Assistant coach(es)

- Karen Blair (SMU)
- Nerlande Nicholas (Rutgers–Newark)
- Richard Fortune (Virginia State)

Legend

- (C) Team captain
- (S) Suspended
- (I) Ineligible
- (W) Walk-on
- Injured
- Current redshirt

Roster

== Schedule ==
Date time, TV	Rank^{#}	Opponent^{#}	Result	Record	Site (attendance) city, state
Regular season
11/11/2016*; 11:00 am		Coppin State	W 73–44	1–0	Siegel Center (4,132); Richmond, Virginia
11/15/2016*; 6:00 pm		Minnesota	L 69–79	1–1	Siegel Center (943); Richmond, Virginia
11/19/2016*; 6:00 pm		at Campbell	W 66–53	2–1	Gore Arena (946); Buies Creek, North Carolina
11/22/2016*; 6:00 pm		IUPUI	L 62–71 ^{OT}	2–2	Siegel Center (502); Richmond, Virginia
11/24/2016*; 8:00 pm		vs. American; San Juan Shootout	W 68–62	3–2	Ocean Center; Daytona Beach, Florida
11/25/2016*; 8:00 pm		vs. Villanova; San Juan Shootout	W 68–66	4–2	Ocean Center; Daytona Beach, Florida
11/30/2016*; 12:00 pm		Iona	L 57–59	4–3	Siegel Center (511); Richmond, Virginia
12/02/2016; 7:00 pm		at George Washington	L 68–81	4–4 (0–1)	Charles E. Smith Center (764); Washington, D.C.
12/07/2016*; 7:00 pm		at Furman	W 75–61	5–4	Timmons Arena (297); Greenville, South Carolina
12/09/2016*; 7:00 pm		at Old Dominion	L 60–70	5–5	Ted Constant Convocation Center (1,470); Norfolk, Virginia
11/11/2016*; 1:00 pm		UNC Greensboro	W 65–54	6–5	Siegel Center (935); Richmond, Virginia
12/17/2016*; 2:00 pm		at Ole Miss	L 57–77	6–6	The Pavilion at Ole Miss (956); Oxford, Mississippi
12/21/2016*; 11:00 am		at Wake Forest	L 54–60	6–7	LJVM Coliseum (5,557); Winston-Salem, North Carolina
12/29/2016*; 1:00 pm		Brown	W 85–72	7–7	Siegel Center (704); Richmond, Virginia
01/01/2017; 1:00 pm		La Salle	W 61–56	8–7 (1–1)	Siegel Center (520); Richmond, Virginia
01/05/2017; 7:00 pm, CBSSN		Richmond; Capital City Classic	W 62–55	9–7 (2–1)	Siegel Center (1,031); Richmond, Virginia
01/08/2017; 1:00 pm, CBSSN		Saint Louis	L 48–62	9–8 (2–2)	Siegel Center (611); Richmond, Virginia
01/11/2017; 11:30 am		at Saint Joseph's	L 58–64	9–9 (2–3)	Hagan Arena (1,462); Philadelphia, Pennsylvania
01/15/2017; 12:00 pm		at George Mason; Rivalry	L 59–70	9–10 (2–4)	EagleBank Arena (804); Fairfax, Virginia
01/18/2017; 1:00 pm		Rhode Island	W 68–57	10–10 (3–4)	Siegel Center (507); Richmond, Virginia
01/21/2017; 2:00 pm		at Fordham	W 61–58	11–10 (4–4)	Rose Hill Gymnasium (892); Bronx, New York
01/28/2017; 1:00 pm		Massachusetts	W 55–52	12–10 (5–4)	Siegel Center (1,106); Richmond, Virginia
01/31/2017; 7:00 pm		at Richmond; Capital City Classic	W 57–55	13–10 (6–4)	Robins Center (1,205); Richmond, Virginia
02/04/2017; 1:00 pm		Dayton	L 48–68	13–11 (6–5)	Siegel Center (1,169); Richmond, Virginia
02/08/2017; 8:00 pm		at Saint Louis	L 72–77	13–12 (6–6)	Chaifetz Arena (511); St. Louis, Missouri
02/12/2017; 3:00 pm, ASN		at Duquesne	L 57–76	13–13 (6–7)	Palumbo Center (821); Pittsburgh, Pennsylvania
02/15/2017; 6:00 pm		Saint Joseph's	L 70–80	13–14 (6–8)	Siegel Center (677); Richmond, Virginia
02/18/2017; 1:00 pm		at St. Bonaventure	W 77–60	14–14 (7–8)	Reilly Center (883); Olean, New York
02/22/2017; 6:00 pm		Davidson	W 54–47	15–14 (8–8)	Siegel Center (937); Richmond, Virginia
Atlantic 10 Women's Tournament
02/26/2017; 1:00 pm		Richmond; First Round	W 72–64	16–14	Siegel Center (530); Richmond, Virginia
03/03/2017; 11:00 am, ASN		vs. Dayton; Quarterfinals	L 61–77	16–15	Richmond Coliseum; Richmond, Virginia
*Non-conference game. ^{#}Rankings from AP Poll. (#) Tournament seedings in parentheses. All times are in Eastern Time.

== Rankings ==
Regular season polls
Poll	Pre- season	Week 2	Week 3	Week 4	Week 5	Week 6	Week 7	Week 8	Week 9	Week 10	Week 11	Week 12	Week 13	Week 14	Week 15	Week 16	Week 17	Week 18	Final
AP																			
Coaches																			

Legend
	Increase in ranking
	Decrease in ranking
	No change
(RV)	Received votes
(NR)	Not ranked

== See also ==
- 2016–17 VCU Rams men's basketball team
