= 2016–17 Davidson Wildcats women's basketball team =

Intercollegiate basketball season

2016–17 Davidson Wildcats women's basketball
- Conference: Atlantic 10 Conference
- Record: 6–23 (4–12 A-10)
- Head coach: Michele Savage (7th season)
- Assistant coaches: Mary Ciuk; Kira Mowen; Shannon Gholar
- Home arena: John M. Belk Arena

2016–17 Atlantic 10 women's basketball standings
	Conf.				Overall
Team	W		L	PCT	W		L	PCT
Dayton †	13	–	3	.813	22	–	10	.688
George Washington	13	–	3	.813	20	–	10	.667
Saint Louis	12	–	4	.750	25	–	9	.735
Saint Joseph's	12	–	4	.750	17	–	15	.531
Fordham	11	–	5	.688	22	–	12	.647
La Salle	9	–	7	.563	17	–	13	.567
Duquesne	8	–	8	.500	18	–	16	.529
VCU	8	–	8	.500	16	–	15	.516
Richmond	7	–	9	.438	13	–	17	.433
George Mason	6	–	10	.375	13	–	17	.433
St. Bonaventure	4	–	12	.250	9	–	20	.310
Davidson	4	–	12	.250	6	–	23	.207
UMass	3	–	13	.188	9	–	21	.300
Rhode Island	2	–	14	.125	6	–	23	.207
† 2017 A10 Tournament winner As of March 20, 2017; Rankings from AP poll

The 2016–17 Davidson Wildcats women's basketball team represented Davidson College during the 2016–17 NCAA Division I women's basketball season. The Wildcats, led by seventh year head coach Michele Savage, played their home games at the John M. Belk Arena as members of the Atlantic 10 Conference. They finished the season 6–23, 4–12 in A-10 play to finish in a tie for eleventh place. They lost in the first round of the A-10 women's tournament to Fordham.

On March 8, Michele Savage was fired. She finished at Davidson with a 7-year record of 96–123.

== 2016–17 media ==
=== Davidson Wildcats Sports Network ===
Select Wildcats games will be broadcast on Teamline with Derek Smith and Leslie Urban providing the call. Most home games will also be featured on the A-10 Digital Network. Select games will be televised.

== Roster ==
2016–17 Davidson Wildcats women's basketball team
Players
Coaches

Pos.	#	Name	Height	Year	Previous school	Hometown
G	0	Kianna Speight	5 ft 8 in (1.73 m)	So	Conway	Conway, AR
G	1	Kayla Seymour	5 ft 9 in (1.75 m)	Sr	Panther Creek; UMBC	Raleigh, NC
G	2	Saadia Timpton	5 ft 8 in (1.73 m)	Jr	Myers Park	Charlotte, NC
F	3	Andrea Robinson	6 ft 1 in (1.85 m)	Fr	McDonogh School	Randallstown, MD
G	5	Justine Lyon	5 ft 9 in (1.75 m)	So	Hillside	Durham, NC
G	13	Mya Webb	5 ft 8 in (1.73 m)	RS Fr	Hillside	Durham, NC
G	13	Diona Johnson	5 ft 9 in (1.75 m)	So	Gates Chili	Rochester, NY
G	21	Chloe Johnson	5 ft 7 in (1.7 m)	RS Jr	St. Mary's; San Diego State	Phoenix, AZ
F	24	Rachel Piles	6 ft 3 in (1.91 m)	Sr	Allen	Allen, TX
G	32	Melanie Ransom	5 ft 9 in (1.75 m)	Sr	Marian Catholic	Lansing, IL
F	42	Ally Welling	6 ft 3 in (1.91 m)	Fr	Concordia Lutheran	The Woodlands, TX
F	44	Mackenzie Latt	6 ft 1 in (1.85 m)	Jr	Richland Gull Lake	Kalamazoo, MI

Head coach

- Michele Savage (Northwestern)

Assistant coach(es)

- Mary Ciuk (Florida)
- Kira Mowen (Youngstown State)
- Shannon Gholar (Cal State San Bernardino)

Legend

- (C) Team captain
- (S) Suspended
- (I) Ineligible
- (W) Walk-on
- Injured
- Current redshirt

Roster

== Schedule ==
Date time, TV	Rank^{#}	Opponent^{#}	Result	Record	Site (attendance) city, state
Non-conference regular season
11/11/2016*; 7:00 pm		at Michigan State	L 34–70	0–1	Breslin Center (3,640); East Lansing, MI
11/13/2016*; 1:00 pm, ESPN3		at Western Michigan	L 63–76	0–2	University Arena (630); Kalamazoo, MI
11/16/2016*; 7:00 pm		UCF	L 38–57	0–3	John M. Belk Arena (371); Davidson, NC
11/19/2016*; 7:00 pm		Radford	L 40–44	0–4	John M. Belk Arena (572); Davidson, NC
11/24/2016*; 4:00 pm		vs. Toledo; Cancún Challenge Riviera Division	L 41–76	0–5	Hard Rock Hotel Riviera Maya (1,610); Cancún, Mexico
11/25/2016*; 4:00 pm		vs. Idaho State; Cancún Challenge Riviera Division	L 58–70	0–6	Hard Rock Hotel Riviera Maya (1,610); Cancún, Mexico
11/30/2016*; 7:00 pm		UNC Wilmington	L 58–67	0–7	John M. Belk Arena (316); Davidson, NC
12/03/2016*; 2:00 pm		at East Tennessee State	L 56–76	0–8	Freedom Hall Civic Center (654); Johnson City, TN
12/07/2016*; 7:00 pm		High Point	W 82–72	1–8	John M. Belk Arena (322); Davidson, NC
12/18/2016*; 2:00 pm		Furman	W 71–61	2–8	John M. Belk Arena (391); Davidson, NC
12/21/2016*; 6:30 pm		at Charlotte	L 79–93	2–9	Dale F. Halton Arena (745); Charlotte, NC
12/29/2016*; 7:00 pm		Mercer	L 60–67	2–10	John M. Belk Arena (268); Davidson, NC
Atlantic 10 regular season
12/31/2016; 11:00 am		Saint Louis	L 69–106	2–11 (0–1)	John M. Belk Arena (371); Davidson, NC
01/04/2017; 7:00 pm		at Fordham	L 72–85	2–12 (0–2)	Rose Hill Gymnasium (432); Bronx, NY
01/07/2017; 2:00 pm		at Duquesne	L 51–73	2–13 (0–3)	Palumbo Center (485); Pittsburgh, PA
01/12/2017; 12:00 pm		Massachusetts	L 60–61	2–14 (0–4)	John M. Belk Arena (742); Davidson, NC
01/15/2017; 2:00 pm, CBSSN		at George Washington	L 62–76	2–15 (0–5)	Charles E. Smith Center (872); Washington, D.C.
01/18/2017; 7:00 pm		George Mason	W 58–54	3–15 (1–5)	John M. Belk Arena (321); Davidson, NC
01/21/2017; 2:00 pm		La Salle	L 58–65	3–16 (1–6)	John M. Belk Arena (707); Davidson, NC
01/25/2017; 7:00 pm		at St. Bonaventure	L 51–70	3–17 (1–7)	Reilly Center (815); Olean, NY
01/28/2017; 2:00 pm		Richmond	L 52–61	3–18 (1–8)	John M. Belk Arena (335); Davidson, NC
02/01/2017; 7:00 pm		Dayton	L 52–68	3–19 (1–9)	John M. Belk Arena (351); Davidson, NC
02/04/2017; 2:00 pm		at Massachusetts	W 63–59	4–19 (2–9)	Mullins Center (401); Amherst, MA
02/08/2017; 7:00 pm		at George Mason	L 55–59	4–20 (2–10)	EagleBank Arena (433); Fairfax, VA
02/11/2017; 2:00 pm		Rhode Island	W 74–64	5–20 (3–10)	John M. Belk Arena (567); Davidson, NC
02/14/2017; 7:00 pm		Fordham	W 52–51	6–20 (4–10)	John M. Belk Arena (473); Davidson, NC
02/18/2017; 2:00 pm		at Saint Joseph's	L 54–69	6–21 (4–11)	Hagan Arena (553); Philadelphia, PA
02/21/2017; 6:00 pm		at VCU	L 47–54	6–22 (4–12)	Siegel Center (937); Richmond, VA
Atlantic 10 Women's Tournament
02/26/2017; 2:00 pm	(12)	at (5) Fordham; First Round	L 54–62	6–23	Rose Hill Gymnasium (890); Bronx, NY
*Non-conference game. ^{#}Rankings from AP Poll. (#) Tournament seedings in parentheses. All times are in Eastern Time.

== Rankings ==
Regular season polls
Poll	Pre- Season	Week 2	Week 3	Week 4	Week 5	Week 6	Week 7	Week 8	Week 9	Week 10	Week 11	Week 12	Week 13	Week 14	Week 15	Week 16	Week 17	Week 18	Final
AP																			
Coaches																			

Legend
	Increase in ranking
	Decrease in ranking
	No change
(RV)	Received votes
(NR)	Not ranked

== See also ==
- 2016–17 Davidson Wildcats men's basketball team
