= 2016–17 UMass Minutewomen basketball team =

Intercollegiate basketball season

2016–17 UMass Minutewomen basketball
- Conference: Atlantic 10 Conference
- Record: 9–21 (3–14 A-10)
- Head coach: Tory Verdi (1st season)
- Assistant coaches: Sheila Roux; Danny Hughes; Candice Walker
- Home arena: William D. Mullins Memorial Center

2016–17 Atlantic 10 women's basketball standings
	Conf.				Overall
Team	W		L	PCT	W		L	PCT
Dayton †	13	–	3	.813	22	–	10	.688
George Washington	13	–	3	.813	20	–	10	.667
Saint Louis	12	–	4	.750	25	–	9	.735
Saint Joseph's	12	–	4	.750	17	–	15	.531
Fordham	11	–	5	.688	22	–	12	.647
La Salle	9	–	7	.563	17	–	13	.567
Duquesne	8	–	8	.500	18	–	16	.529
VCU	8	–	8	.500	16	–	15	.516
Richmond	7	–	9	.438	13	–	17	.433
George Mason	6	–	10	.375	13	–	17	.433
St. Bonaventure	4	–	12	.250	9	–	20	.310
Davidson	4	–	12	.250	6	–	23	.207
UMass	3	–	13	.188	9	–	21	.300
Rhode Island	2	–	14	.125	6	–	23	.207
† 2017 A10 Tournament winner As of March 20, 2017; Rankings from AP poll

The 2016–17 UMass Minutewomen basketball team represented the University of Massachusetts Amherst during the 2016–17 college basketball season. The Minutewomen, led by first year head coach Tory Verdi, are members of the Atlantic 10 Conference and played their home games at the William D. Mullins Memorial Center. They finished the season 9–21, 3–14 in A-10 play to finish in 13th place. They lost in the first round of the A-10 women's tournament to Saint Louis.

== 2016–17 media ==
All non-televised Minutewomen home games and conference road games will stream on the A-10 Digital Network. WMUA will carry Minutewomen games with Mike Knittle on the call.

== Roster ==
2016–17 UMass Minutewomen women's basketball team
Players
Coaches

Pos.	#	Name	Height	Year	Previous school	Hometown
F/C	00	Maggie Mulligan	6 ft 2 in (1.88 m)	Jr	Boston Latin School	Boston, MA
G	2	Ryan Holder	5 ft 8 in (1.73 m)	Fr	Roland Park Country School	Baltimore, MD
G	3	Alyx Stiff	5 ft 9 in (1.75 m)	Sr	Quest Preparatory Academy	Las Vegas, NV
C	10	Allison Mahoney	6 ft 4 in (1.93 m)	Fr	Norwell HS	Norwell, MA
G	14	Megan Burke	5 ft 8 in (1.73 m)	Sr	Shelton HS	Shelton, CT
F	15	Taylor Tucker	6 ft 0 in (1.83 m)	Fr	Redan HS	Covington, GA
G	21	Gabrielle Kenefick	5 ft 8 in (1.73 m)	So	Canton HS	Canton, MA
G	22	Jessica George	5 ft 10 in (1.78 m)	So	North Point	Waldorf, MD
G/F	24	Hailey Leidel	5 ft 11 in (1.8 m)	Fr	Woodhaven	Brownstown, MI
G	25	Leah McDerment	5 ft 10 in (1.78 m)	Jr	Priestnall School	Stockport, England
F	32	Alyssa Lawrence	6 ft 1 in (1.85 m)	RS Sr	The Ursuline School; San Diego State	New Rochelle, NY

Head coach

- Tory Verdi (Keene State)

Assistant coach(es)

- Sheila Roux (Milwaukee)
- Danny Hughes (TCU)
- Candice Walker (Loyola (MD))

Legend

- (C) Team captain
- (S) Suspended
- (I) Ineligible
- (W) Walk-on
- Injured
- Current redshirt

Roster

== Schedule ==
Date time, TV	Rank^{#}	Opponent^{#}	Result	Record	Site (attendance) city, state
Exbitition
11/03/2016*; 7:00 pm		UMass Dartmouth	W 76–27		Mullins Center; Amherst, MA
Regular season
11/11/2016*; 7:00 pm		at Buffalo	L 47–61	0–1	Alumni Arena (1,719); Amherst, NY
11/14/2016*; 7:00 pm		North Dakota State	W 70–58	1–1	Mullins Center (284); Amherst, MA
11/19/2016*; 11:30 am		at Iowa; Hawkeye Challenge semifinals	L 30–71	1–2	Carver–Hawkeye Arena (3,435); Iowa City, IA
11/20/2016*; 12:30 pm		vs. Montana; Hawkeye Challenge 3rd place game	W 59–58	2–2	Carver–Hawkeye Arena (107); Iowa City, IA
11/23/2016*; 2:00 pm		Central Connecticut	W 76–37	3–2	Mullins Center (293); Amherst, MA
11/27/2016*; 2:00 pm		Merrimack	W 73–44	4–2	Mullins Center (374); Amherst, MA
11/30/2016*; 6:00 pm		at Hartford	L 56–75	4–3	Chase Arena at Reich Family Pavilion; Hartford, CT
12/04/2016; 1:00 pm		George Mason	L 55–66	4–4 (0–1)	Mullins Center (305); Amherst, MA
12/07/2016*; 7:00 pm		at Hofstra	L 55–71	4–5	Hofstra Arena (183); Hempstead, NY
12/10/2016*; 2:00 pm		Bryant	W 68–62	5–5	Mullins Center (495); Amherst, MA
12/14/2016*; 7:00 pm		at Boston University	L 60–64	5–6	Case Gym (186); Boston, MA
12/18/2016*; 2:00 pm		Holy Cross	W 69–66	6–6	Mullins Center (345); Amherst, MA
12/27/2016*; 12:00 pm		at FIU; FIU Holiday Tournament	L 57–58	6–7	FIU Arena (339); Miami, FL
12/28/2016*; 12:00 pm		vs. Drexel; FIU Holiday Tournament	L 47–65	6–8	FIU Arena; Miami, FL
12/31/2016; 2:00 pm		at Dayton	L 65–77	6–9 (0–2)	UD Arena (1,809); Dayton, OH
01/04/2017; 7:00 pm		Rhode Island	W 68–67	7–9 (1–2)	Mullins Center (413); Amherst, MA
01/07/2017; 7:00 pm		at Saint Joseph's	L 50–81	7–10 (1–3)	Hagan Arena (843); Philadelphia, PA
01/12/2017; 12:00 pm		at Davidson	W 61–60	8–10 (2–3)	John M. Belk Arena (742); Davidson, NC
01/15/2017; 12:00 pm, CBSSN		Duquesne	W 75–67	9–10 (3–3)	Mullins Center (1,006); Amherst, MA
01/19/2017; 11:00 am		St. Bonaventure	L 38–55	9–11 (3–4)	Mullins Center (2,650); Amherst, MA
01/21/2017; 3:00 pm		George Washington	L 54–60 ^{2OT}	9–12 (3–5)	Mullins Center (903); Amherst, MA
01/25/2017; 12:00 pm		at La Salle	L 64–68	9–13 (3–6)	Tom Gola Arena (567); Philadelphia, PA
01/28/2017; 1:00 pm		at VCU	L 52–55	9–14 (3–7)	Siegel Center (1,106); Richmond, VA
02/01/2017; 7:00 pm		Saint Louis	L 60–81	9–15 (3–8)	Mullins Center (460); Amherst, MA
02/04/2017; 2:00 pm		Davidson	L 59–63	9–16 (3–9)	Mullins Center (401); Amherst, MA
02/11/2017; 2:00 pm		at Fordham	L 43–74	9–17 (3–10)	Rose Hill Gymnasium (797); Bronx, NY
02/15/2017; 7:00 pm		at Richmond	L 45–56	9–18 (3–11)	Robins Center (537); Richmond, VA
02/18/2017; 3:00 pm		La Salle	L 52–57	9–19 (3–12)	Mullins Center (650); Amherst, MA
02/22/2017; 7:00 pm		at Rhode Island	L 50–53	9–20 (3–13)	Ryan Center (449); Kingston, RI
Atlantic 10 Women's Tournament
02/26/2017; 3:00 pm		at Saint Louis; First Round	L 51–91	9–21	Chaifetz Arena (573); St. Louis, MO
*Non-conference game. ^{#}Rankings from AP Poll. (#) Tournament seedings in parentheses. All times are in Eastern Time.

== Rankings ==
2016–17 NCAA Division I women's basketball rankings

Regular season polls
Poll	Pre- Season	Week 2	Week 3	Week 4	Week 5	Week 6	Week 7	Week 8	Week 9	Week 10	Week 11	Week 12	Week 13	Week 14	Week 15	Week 16	Week 17	Week 18	Final
AP																			
Coaches																			

Legend
	Increase in ranking
	Decrease in ranking
	No change
(RV)	Received votes
(NR)	Not ranked

== See also ==
- 2016–17 UMass Minutemen basketball team
