= 2016–17 George Mason Patriots women's basketball team =

American college basketball season

2016–17 George Mason Patriots women's basketball
- Conference: Atlantic 10 Conference
- Record: 13–17 (6–10 A-10)
- Head coach: Nyla Milleson (4th season)
- Assistant coaches: Tajama Abraham Ngongba; Bob Dunn; Christopher Lewis
- Home arena: EagleBank Arena

2016–17 Atlantic 10 women's basketball standings
	Conf.				Overall
Team	W		L	PCT	W		L	PCT
Dayton †	13	–	3	.813	22	–	10	.688
George Washington	13	–	3	.813	20	–	10	.667
Saint Louis	12	–	4	.750	25	–	9	.735
Saint Joseph's	12	–	4	.750	17	–	15	.531
Fordham	11	–	5	.688	22	–	12	.647
La Salle	9	–	7	.563	17	–	13	.567
Duquesne	8	–	8	.500	18	–	16	.529
VCU	8	–	8	.500	16	–	15	.516
Richmond	7	–	9	.438	13	–	17	.433
George Mason	6	–	10	.375	13	–	17	.433
St. Bonaventure	4	–	12	.250	9	–	20	.310
Davidson	4	–	12	.250	6	–	23	.207
UMass	3	–	13	.188	9	–	21	.300
Rhode Island	2	–	14	.125	6	–	23	.207
† 2017 A10 Tournament winner As of March 20, 2017; Rankings from AP poll

The 2016–17 George Mason Patriots women's basketball team represented George Mason University during the 2016–17 NCAA Division I women's basketball season. The Patriots, led by third year head coach Nyla Milleson, played their home games at EagleBank Arena and were members of the Atlantic 10 Conference. They finished the season 13–17, 6–10 in A-10 play to finish in tenth place. They lost in the first round of the A-10 women's tournament to Duquesne.

== 2016–2017 Media ==
=== George Mason Patriots Sports Network ===
Patriots games will be broadcast on WGMU Radio and streamed online through Patriot Vision. Most home games will also be featured on the A-10 Digital Network. Select games will be televised.

== Roster ==
2016–17 George Mason Patriots women's basketball team
Players
Coaches

Pos.	#	Name	Height	Year	Previous school	Hometown
F	0	Taylor Byrne (I) (redshirt)	6 ft 1 in (1.85 m)	So	Long Island Lutheran; Seton Hall	Massapequa, NY
G	3	Camden Musgrave (I) (redshirt)	5 ft 7 in (1.7 m)	Jr	Elizabeth Seton; Central Connecticut	Bowie, MD
G/F	4	DeJah Williford-Kelley	6 ft 1 in (1.85 m)	Fr	Lower Richland	Columbia, SC
G	5	Alexsis Grate	5 ft 6 in (1.68 m)	Fr	Bethel	Hampton, VA
G	10	Jewel Triggs	5 ft 11 in (1.8 m)	So	Thibodaux	Thibodaux, LA
G/F	11	Jacy Bolton	6 ft 0 in (1.83 m)	Fr	Drexel	Drexel, MO
G/F	12	Kara Wright	5 ft 11 in (1.8 m)	RS Sr	DuPont Manual; Southeast Missouri State	Louisville, KY
C	13	Bridget O'Donnell	6 ft 6 in (1.98 m)	RS Sr	Montgomery; UMBC	Belle Mead, NJ
G	14	Sylvia Maxwell	5 ft 7 in (1.7 m)	RS Sr	Waverly; Niagara	Lansing, MI
F	20	Chinyere Bell	5 ft 11 in (1.8 m)	So	South View	Fayetteville, NC
F	21	Casey Davis	6 ft 2 in (1.88 m)	RS So	Elizabeth Seton	Gambrills, MD
F	24	Tiffany Padgett	6 ft 1 in (1.85 m)	RS Sr	St. Vincent Pallotti; Loyola (MD)	Laurel, MD
G	32	Tayler Dodson	5 ft 11 in (1.8 m)	Jr	Spotswood	Harrisonburg, VA
F	35	Allie McCool	6 ft 2 in (1.88 m)	Fr	East Central	St. Leon, IN
G	44	Sarah Kaminski	5 ft 9 in (1.75 m)	Fr	Minnehaha	Plymouth, MN

Head coach

- Nyla Milleson (Kansas State)

Assistant coach(es)

- Tajama Abraham Ngongba (George Washington)
- Bob Dunn (Dayton)
- Christopher Lewis (Emporia State)

Legend

- (C) Team captain
- (S) Suspended
- (I) Ineligible
- (W) Walk-on
- Injured
- Current redshirt

Roster

== Schedule ==
Date time, TV	Rank^{#}	Opponent^{#}	Result	Record	Site (attendance) city, state
Exhibition
11/03/2016*; 7:00 pm		Washington Adventist	W 97–27		EagleBank Arena (321); Fairfax, VA
Regular season
11/11/2016*; 7:00 pm		Radford	W 70–56	1–0	EagleBank Arena (739); Fairfax, VA
11/13/2016*; 2:00 pm		at Delaware	L 51–67	1–1	Bob Carpenter Center (1,320); Newark, DE
11/15/2016*; 7:00 pm		at LIU Brooklyn	W 64–48	2–1	Steinberg Wellness Center (281); Brooklyn, NY
11/18/2016*; 5:00 pm		Arizona	L 70–81	2–2	EagleBank Arena (635); Fairfax, VA
11/21/2016*; 7:00 pm		Norfolk State	W 60–33	3–2	EagleBank Arena (479); Fairfax, VA
11/23/2016*; 7:00 pm		Stephen F. Austin	L 76–77	3–3	EagleBank Arena (465); Fairfax, VA
11/27/2016*; 2:00 pm		at Towson	L 75–79	3–4	SECU Arena (278); Towson, MD
11/30/2016*; 11:00 am		at Detroit	W 55–54	4–4	Calihan Hall (3,117); Detroit, MI
12/04/2016; 1:00 pm		at Massachusetts	W 66–55	5–4 (1–0)	Mullins Center (305); Amherst, MA
12/08/2016*; 7:00 pm		at Georgetown	L 56–69	5–5	McDonough Gymnasium (673); Washington, D.C.
12/11/2016*; 2:00 pm, ESPN3		at Illinois State	W 72–46	6–5	Redbird Arena (718); Normal, IL
12/20/2016*; 7:00 pm		Navy	W 68–64 ^{OT}	7–5	Recreation Athletic Complex (483); Fairfax, VA
12/27/2016*; 2:00 pm		vs. Drexel; FIU Holiday Tournament	L 71–82	7–6	FIU Arena (339); Miami, FL
12/28/2016*; 2:00 pm		at FIU; FIU Holiday Tournament	W 67–51	8–6	FIU Arena (369); Miami, FL
12/31/2016; 2:00 pm		St. Bonaventure	W 52–49	9–6 (2–0)	EagleBank Arena (647); Fairfax, VA
01/04/2017; 8:00 pm		at Saint Louis	L 50–89	9–7 (2–1)	Chaifetz Arena (1,021); St. Louis, MO
01/07/2017; 1:00 pm		Fordham	L 49–53	9–8 (2–2)	EagleBank Arena (654); Fairfax, VA
01/11/2017; 11:00 am		George Washington	L 71–79 ^{OT}	9–9 (2–3)	EagleBank Arena (465); Fairfax, VA
01/15/2017; 12:00 pm		VCU; Rivalry	W 70–59	10–9 (3–3)	EagleBank Arena (804); Fairfax, VA
01/18/2017; 7:00 pm		at Davidson	L 54–58	10–10 (3–4)	John M. Belk Arena (321); Davidson, NC
01/22/2017; 5:00 pm, ASN		at Richmond	W 54–50	11–10 (4–4)	Robins Center (504); Richmond, VA
01/24/2017; 7:00 pm		Dayton	L 48–60	11–11 (4–5)	EagleBank Arena (546); Fairfax, VA
01/28/2017; 1:00 pm		at La Salle	L 57–59	11–12 (4–6)	Tom Gola Arena (324); Philadelphia, PA
02/05/2017; 2:00 pm, ASN		at Duquesne	L 57–76	11–13 (4–7)	Palumbo Center (821); Pittsburgh, PA
02/08/2017; 7:00 pm		Davidson	W 59–55	12–13 (5–7)	EagleBank Arena (433); Fairfax, VA
02/12/2017; 2:00 pm		Richmond	L 58–70	12–14 (5–8)	EagleBank Arena (1,710); Fairfax, VA
02/15/2017; 7:00 pm		Rhode Island	W 60–51	13–14 (6–8)	EagleBank Arena (762); Fairfax, VA
02/18/2017; 2:00 pm		at George Washington	L 49–80	13–15 (6–9)	Charles E. Smith Center (1,587); Washington, D.C.
02/22/2017; 7:00 pm		at Saint Joseph's	L 53–57 ^{OT}	13–16 (6–10)	Hagan Arena (543); Philadelphia, PA
Atlantic 10 Women's Tournament
02/25/2017; 2:00 pm		at Duquesne; First Round	L 55–66	13–17	Palumbo Center (471); Pittsburgh, PA
*Non-conference game. ^{#}Rankings from AP Poll. (#) Tournament seedings in parentheses. All times are in Eastern Time.

== Rankings ==
2016–17 NCAA Division I women's basketball rankings

+ Regular season polls	Poll	Pre- Season	Week 2	Week 3	Week 4	Week 5	Week 6	Week 7	Week 8	Week 9	Week 10	Week 11	Week 12	Week 13	Week 14	Week 15	Week 16	Week 17	Week 18	Week 19	Final
AP																				N/A	
Coaches																					

Legend
	Increase in ranking
	Decrease in ranking
	No change
(RV)	Received votes
(NR)	Not ranked

== See also ==
- 2016–17 George Mason Patriots men's basketball team
