= Shauna Green =

American basketball coach

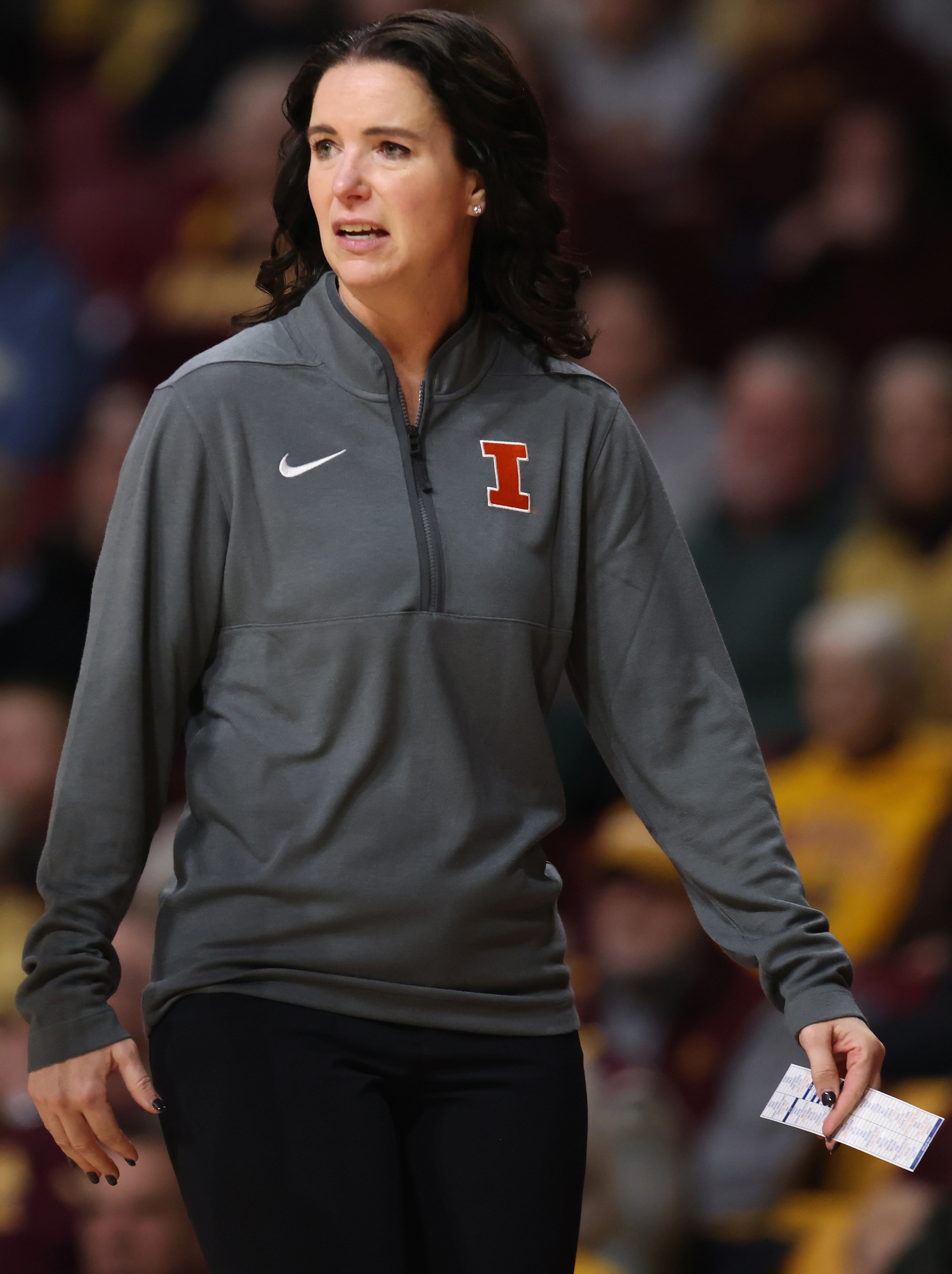
- Green in 2025

Current position
- Title: Head coach
- Team: Illinois
- Conference: Big Ten
- Record: 85–47 (.644)

Biographical details
- Born: October 31, 1979 (age 46); Clinton, Iowa, U.S.

Playing career
- 1998–2002: Canisius

Coaching career (HC unless noted)
- 2002–2005: Loras (assistant)
- 2005–2007: Loras
- 2007–2012: Providence (assistant)
- 2012–2015: Dayton (assistant)
- 2015–2016: Northwestern (assistant)
- 2016–2022: Dayton
- 2022–present: Illinois

Head coaching record
- Overall: 241–122 (.664)

Accomplishments and honors

Championships
- WBIT (2024); 5× Atlantic 10 regular season (2017, 2018, 2020–2022); 2× Atlantic 10 tournament (2017, 2020)

Awards
- 3× First-team All-MAAC (2000–2002); MAAC Freshman of the Year (1999); MAAC All-Freshman Team (1999)

Shauna Geronzin Green (born October 31, 1979) is an American basketball coach.

== Career ==
She coaches the Illinois Fighting Illini women's basketball team at the University of Illinois. She was hired in March 2022. Green's .621 winning percentage after her first two seasons at Illinois is the best start for the program's head coach, after Theresa Grentz's 1995–97 teams won .617 percent of their games. On October 24, 2024, the university announced that Green's contract had been extended for two additional years, keeping the coach at Illinois at least through the 2029–30 season. In September 2026, Green's contract was extended again, through the 2035–36 season, to be based on team performance in the coming years.

In her first season at Dayton, Green won the WBCA Maggie Dixon Rookie Coach of the Year after "leading the team to a 22–10 record, 13–3 A-10 mark, and a berth in the NCAA Division I Tournament".

== Personal life ==
Green is married to her husband Andy, an elementary school teacher. They have one son.

== Canisius statistics ==
Legend
GP	Games played	GS	Games started	MPG	Minutes per game
FG%	Field goal percentage	3P%	3-point field goal percentage	FT%	Free throw percentage
RPG	Rebounds per game	APG	Assists per game	SPG	Steals per game
BPG	Blocks per game	PPG	Points per game	**Bold**	Career high

Year	Team	GP	Points	FG%	3P%	FT%	RPG	APG	SPG	BPG	PPG
1998–99	Canisius	22	329	**46.7%**	33.3%	77.7%	7.7	**3.9**	1.0	0.1	15.0
1999-00	Canisius	**29**	**595**	42.0%	**40.3%**	**83.1%**	**9.9**	1.6	0.8	**0.2**	**20.5**
2000–01	Canisius	28	518	40.9%	38.0%	68.2%	8.0	1.6	**1.2**	0.1	18.5
2001–02	Canisius	28	570	38.7%	32.2%	72.0%	8.3	1.8	1.2	0.1	20.4
Career		107	2012	41.4%	36.1%	75.5%	8.5	2.1	1.0	0.1	18.8

== Head coaching record ==
Record table
Season	Team	Overall	Conference	Standing	Postseason
**Loras Duhawks** (American Rivers Conference) (2005–2007)
2005–06	Loras	12–15			
2006–07	Loras	17–10			
Loras:		29–25 (.537)			
**Dayton Flyers** (Atlantic 10 Conference) (2016–2022)
2016–17	Dayton	22–10	13–3	T-1st	NCAA Division I Round of 64
2017–18	Dayton	23–7	15–1	1st	NCAA Division I Round of 64
2018–19	Dayton	17–14	10–6	T-4th	NCAA Women's NIT first round
2019–20	Dayton	25–8	15–1	1st	Postseason not held due to COVID-19
2020–21	Dayton	14–5	12–1	1st	NCAA Women's NIT first round
2021–22	Dayton	26–6	14–1	1st	NCAA Division I Round of 64
Dayton:		127–50 (.718)	79–13 (.859)		
**Illinois Fighting Illini** (Big Ten Conference) (2022–present)
2022–23	Illinois	22–10	11–7	T-5th	NCAA Division I First Four
2023–24	Illinois	19–15	8–10	9th	WBIT Champions
2024–25	Illinois	22–10	11–7	T-5th	NCAA Division I Round of 32
2025-26	Illinois	22–12	9–9	10th	NCAA Division I Round of 32
2026-27	Illinois	0–0	0–0	–	–
Illinois:		85–47 (.644)	39–33 (.542)		
Total:		241–122 (.664)			
National champion Postseason invitational champion Conference regular season champion Conference regular season and conference tournament champion Division regular season champion Division regular season and conference tournament champion Conference tournament champion

== Honors ==
- Canisius Athletic Hall of Fame (2012)
