= 2016–17 St. Bonaventure Bonnies women's basketball team =

Intercollegiate basketball season

2016–17 St. Bonaventure Bonnies women's basketball
- Conference: Atlantic 10 Conference
- Record: 9–20 (4–12 A-10)
- Head coach: Jesse Fleming (1st season)
- Assistant coaches: Andrea Mulcahy; Jeff Clapacs; Jennifer Pruett
- Home arena: Reilly Center

2016–17 Atlantic 10 women's basketball standings
	Conf.				Overall
Team	W		L	PCT	W		L	PCT
Dayton †	13	–	3	.813	22	–	10	.688
George Washington	13	–	3	.813	20	–	10	.667
Saint Louis	12	–	4	.750	25	–	9	.735
Saint Joseph's	12	–	4	.750	17	–	15	.531
Fordham	11	–	5	.688	22	–	12	.647
La Salle	9	–	7	.563	17	–	13	.567
Duquesne	8	–	8	.500	18	–	16	.529
VCU	8	–	8	.500	16	–	15	.516
Richmond	7	–	9	.438	13	–	17	.433
George Mason	6	–	10	.375	13	–	17	.433
St. Bonaventure	4	–	12	.250	9	–	20	.310
Davidson	4	–	12	.250	6	–	23	.207
UMass	3	–	13	.188	9	–	21	.300
Rhode Island	2	–	14	.125	6	–	23	.207
† 2017 A10 Tournament winner As of March 20, 2017; Rankings from AP poll

The 2016–17 St. Bonaventure Bonnies women's basketball team represented the St. Bonaventure University during the 2016–17 NCAA Division I women's basketball season. The Bonnies, led by first year head coach Jesse Fleming, played their home games at Reilly Center and are members of the Atlantic 10 Conference. They finished the season 9–21, 4–12 in A-10 play to finish in a tie for eleventh place. They lost in the first round of the A-10 women's tournament to La Salle.

== 2016–17 media ==
All non-televised Bonnies home games will air on the A-10 Digital Network. WGWE will continue to be the radio broadcaster for the team. Chris Russell will replace the retiring Mike "Smitty" Smith as the team's play-by-play voice; no color commentator is used.

== Roster ==
2016–17 St. Bonaventure Bonnies women's basketball team
Players
Coaches

Pos.	#	Name	Height	Year	Previous school	Hometown
G	1	Keely Fresh	5 ft 8 in (1.73 m)	So	Rockbridge County	Lexington, VA
G	2	Mariah Ruff	5 ft 9 in (1.75 m)	Jr	Oneonta	Oneonta, NY
G	3	Danielle Migliore	5 ft 7 in (1.7 m)	Fr	Frankfort-Schuyler	Frankfort, NY
G	4	Jalisha Terry	5 ft 6 in (1.68 m)	Fr	Hamady	Flint, Mich
G	10	McKenna Maycock	5 ft 9 in (1.75 m)	So	Randolph	Randolph, NY
F	14	Gabrielle Richmond	6 ft 1 in (1.85 m)	GS	Morgan Park	Chicago, IL
G	22	Imani Outlaw	5 ft 8 in (1.73 m)	Sr	Sycamore	Cincinnati, OH
F	23	Matea Britvar	6 ft 1 in (1.85 m)	Jr	Dr. Phillips	Orlando, FL
G	32	Rhianna Council	5 ft 11 in (1.8 m)	Fr	Northern	Durham, NC
G	33	Sarah Hart	5 ft 9 in (1.75 m)	Fr	Plainview-Elgin-Millville	Elgin, MN
F	45	Sarah Young	6 ft 2 in (1.88 m)	Fr	Sacred Heart Academy	Depew, NY
F		C'quoya Haughton (redshirt)	6 ft 1 in (1.85 m)	Jr	Stoneleigh Burnham Prep; Rider	Albany, NY

Head coach

- Jesse Fleming (St. Bonaventure)

Assistant coach(es)

- Andrea Mulcahy (St. Bonaventure)
- Jeff Clapacs (Wooster)
- Jennifer Pruett (Ohio)

Legend

- (C) Team captain
- (S) Suspended
- (I) Ineligible
- (W) Walk-on
- Injured
- Current redshirt

Roster

== Schedule ==
Date time, TV	Rank^{#}	Opponent^{#}	Result	Record	Site (attendance) city, state
Exhibition
11/05/2016*; 1:30 pm		Edinboro	W 50–25		Reilly Center; Olean, NY
Non-conference regular season
11/11/2016*; 7:00 pm		at Niagara	L 43–65	0–1	Gallagher Center; Lewiston, NY
11/13/2016*; 1:00 pm		Colgate	W 70–57	1–1	Reilly Center (847); Olean, NY
11/16/2016*; 7:00 pm		Canisius	L 57–74	1–2	Reilly Center (854); Olean, NY
11/19/2016*; 5:00 pm		at Delaware	L 40–43	1–3	Bob Carpenter Center (1,130); Wilmington, DE
11/26/2016*; 12:00 pm		vs. Austin Peay; UCF Thanksgiving Classic	W 58–57	2–3	CFE Arena (117); Orlando, FL
11/27/2016*; 12:00 pm		vs. Rider; UCF Thanksgiving Classic	W 60–47	3–3	CFE Arena; Orlando, FL
11/30/2016*; 5:30 pm, SPCSN		Stony Brook	W 51–37	4–3	Reilly Center (957); Olean, NY
12/06/2016*; 7:00 pm		Bucknell	L 35–57	4–4	Reilly Center (587); Olean, NY
12/09/2016*; 11:00 am, ESPN3		at Eastern Michigan	L 56–75	4–5	Convocation Center (3,509); Ypsilanti, MI
12/11/2016*; 12:00 pm, ESPN3		at Toledo	L 50–74	4–6	Savage Arena (3,143); Toledo, OH
12/18/2016*; 1:00 pm		Albany	W 67–59	5–6	Reilly Center (742); Olean, NY
12/21/2016*; 12:00 pm, ESPN3		at Buffalo	L 47–68	5–7	Alumni Arena (1,624); Amherst, NY
Atlantic 10 regular season
12/28/2016; 4:00 pm		Rhode Island	W 78–69	6–7 (1–0)	Reilly Center (714); Olean, NY
12/31/2016; 2:00 pm		at George Mason	L 49–52	6–8 (1–1)	EagleBank Arena (647); Fairfax, VA
01/04/2017; 7:00 pm		Dayton	L 60–62	6–9 (1–2)	Reilly Center (482); Olean, NY
01/07/2017; 3:00 pm		at Richmond	L 54–61	6–10 (1–3)	Robins Center (547); Richmond, VA
01/11/2017; 12:00 pm, NBCSN		at Saint Louis	L 49–64	6–11 (1–4)	Chaifetz Arena (3,581); St. Louis, MO
01/15/2017; 1:00 pm		Fordham	L 44–60	6–12 (1–5)	Reilly Center (885); Olean, NY
01/19/2017; 11:00 am		at Massachusetts	W 55–38	7–12 (2–5)	Mullins Center (2,650); Amherst, MA
01/21/2017; 4:00 pm		Duquesne	W 69–56	8–12 (3–5)	Reilly Center (904); Olean, NY
01/25/2017; 7:00 pm		Davidson	W 70–51	9–12 (4–5)	Reilly Center (815); Olean, NY
01/29/2017; 3:00 pm, ASN		at Saint Joseph's	L 53–70	9–13 (4–6)	Hagan Arena (1,342); Philadelphia, PA
02/04/2017; 2:00 pm		at Fordham	L 45–57	9–14 (4–7)	Rose Hill Gymnasium (681); Bronx, NY
02/07/2017; 7:00 pm		La Salle	L 45–57	9–15 (4–8)	Reilly Center (819); Olean, NY
02/11/2017; 1:00 pm		Saint Louis	L 58–74	9–16 (4–9)	Reilly Center (735); Olean, NY
02/15/2017; 7:00 pm		at George Washington	L 57–63	9–17 (4–10)	Charles E. Smith Center (405); Washington, D.C.
02/18/2017; 1:00 pm		VCU	L 60–77	9–18 (4–11)	Reilly Center (883); Olean, NY
02/21/2017; 7:00 pm		at Duquesne	L 61–83	9–19 (4–12)	Palumbo Center (657); Pittsburgh, PA
Atlantic 10 Tournament
02/25/2017; 12:00 pm		at La Salle; First Round	L 70–73	9–20 (4–13)	Tom Gola Arena (407); Philadelphia, PA
*Non-conference game. ^{#}Rankings from AP Poll. (#) Tournament seedings in parentheses. All times are in Eastern Time.

== Rankings ==
2016–17 NCAA Division I women's basketball rankings

Regular season polls
Poll	Pre- Season	Week 2	Week 3	Week 4	Week 5	Week 6	Week 7	Week 8	Week 9	Week 10	Week 11	Week 12	Week 13	Week 14	Week 15	Week 16	Week 17	Week 18	Week 19	Final
AP																				N/A
Coaches																				

Legend
	Increase in ranking
	Decrease in ranking
	No change
(RV)	Received votes
(NR)	Not ranked

== See also ==
- 2016–17 St. Bonaventure Bonnies men's basketball team
