= 2016–17 Saint Louis Billikens women's basketball team =

Intercollegiate basketball season

2016–17 Saint Louis Billikens women's basketball
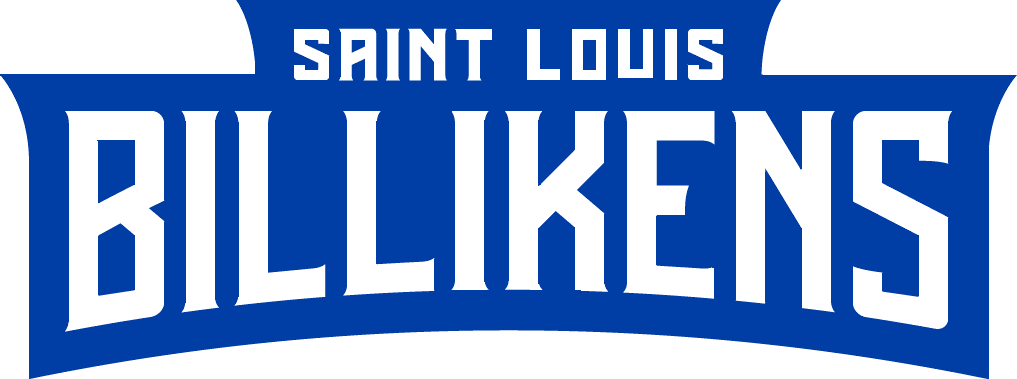

WNIT, Second Round
- Conference: Atlantic 10 Conference
- Record: 25–9 (12–4 A-10)
- Head coach: Lisa Stone (5th season)
- Assistant coaches: Mike Geary; Ty Margenthaler; Jordann Plummer
- Home arena: Chaifetz Arena

2016–17 Atlantic 10 women's basketball standings
	Conf.				Overall
Team	W		L	PCT	W		L	PCT
Dayton †	13	–	3	.813	22	–	10	.688
George Washington	13	–	3	.813	20	–	10	.667
Saint Louis	12	–	4	.750	25	–	9	.735
Saint Joseph's	12	–	4	.750	17	–	15	.531
Fordham	11	–	5	.688	22	–	12	.647
La Salle	9	–	7	.563	17	–	13	.567
Duquesne	8	–	8	.500	18	–	16	.529
VCU	8	–	8	.500	16	–	15	.516
Richmond	7	–	9	.438	13	–	17	.433
George Mason	6	–	10	.375	13	–	17	.433
St. Bonaventure	4	–	12	.250	9	–	20	.310
Davidson	4	–	12	.250	6	–	23	.207
UMass	3	–	13	.188	9	–	21	.300
Rhode Island	2	–	14	.125	6	–	23	.207
† 2017 A10 Tournament winner As of March 20, 2017; Rankings from AP poll

The 2016–17 Saint Louis Billikens women's basketball team represented the Saint Louis University during the 2016–17 NCAA Division I women's basketball season. The Billikens, led by fifth year head coach Lisa Stone, played their home games at the Chaifetz Arena and were members of the Atlantic 10 Conference.

== 2016–17 media ==
All non-televised Billikens home games and conference road games will stream on the A-10 Digital Network.

== Roster ==
2016–17 Saint Louis Billikens women's basketball team
Players
Coaches

Pos.	#	Name	Height	Year	Previous school	Hometown
G	3	Jackie Kemph	5 ft 7 in (1.7 m)	Jr	Rolling Meadows	Arlington Heights, IL
G	4	Kerri McMahan	5 ft 10 in (1.78 m)	RS So	Novi; Akron	Novi, MI
G	5	Aaliyah Covington	5 ft 11 in (1.8 m)	Jr	Edwardsville	Edwardsville, IL
F	10	Jenny Vliet	6 ft 2 in (1.88 m)	Jr	Rolling Meadows	Arlington Heights, IL
F	12	Olivia Jakubicek	5 ft 10 in (1.78 m)	Sr	Cary-Grove	Cary, IL
G	15	Paige Rakers	5 ft 11 in (1.8 m)	RS Jr	Carlyle; Michigan	Carlyle, IL
G	20	Jordyn Frantz	6 ft 0 in (1.83 m)	So	NorthWood	Wakarusa, IN
F	25	Hanna Frazier	6 ft 2 in (1.88 m)	Fr	Batavia	Batavia, IL
F	33	Erin Nelson	5 ft 10 in (1.78 m)	Sr	St. Joseph's	Ballwin, MO
F	34	Kendra Wilken	6 ft 2 in (1.88 m)	Fr	Breese Central	Bartelso, IL
C	40	Sadie Stipanovich	6 ft 3 in (1.91 m)	Sr	Westminster Christian Academy	St. Louis, MO
F	42	Maddison Gits	6 ft 4 in (1.93 m)	Jr	Oregon	Fitchburg, WI
C	45	Tara Dusharm	6 ft 5 in (1.96 m)	So	Foley	Foley, MN
F	55	Shea Shipman	6 ft 0 in (1.83 m)	Jr	Olathe Northwest	Olathe, KS

Head coach

- Lisa Stone (Iowa)

Assistant coach(es)

- Mike Geary (Aquinas (MI))
- Ty Margenthaler (SIU Edwardsville)
- Jordann Plummer (Drake)

Legend

- (C) Team captain
- (S) Suspended
- (I) Ineligible
- (W) Walk-on
- Injured
- Current redshirt

Roster

== Schedule ==
Date time, TV	Rank^{#}	Opponent^{#}	Result	Record	Site (attendance) city, state
Exhibition
11/04/2016*; 4:30 pm		Maryville	W 69–41		Chaifetz Arena; St. Louis, MO
Non-conference regular season
11/11/2016*; 4:00 pm		at UC Irvine	W 79–69	1–0	Bren Events Center (266); Irvine, CA
11/13/2016*; 4:00 pm		at Loyola Marymount	W 90–76	2–0	Gersten Pavilion (432); Los Angeles, CA
11/17/2016*; 4:30 pm		SIU Edwardsville	W 90–49	3–0	Chaifetz Arena (312); St. Louis, MO
11/20/2016*; 2:00 pm		at Bradley	W 68–58	4–0	Renaissance Coliseum (607); Peoria, IL
11/23/2016*; 2:00 pm		Morgan State	W 71–44	5–0	Chaifetz Arena (646); St. Louis, MO
11/26/2016*; 3:00 pm		at Little Rock	L 43–56	5–1	Jack Stephens Center (1,132); Little Rock, AR
11/29/2016*; 6:30 pm		at Southeast Missouri State	W 89–50	6–1	Show Me Center (693); Cape Girardeau, MO
12/03/2016*; 2:00 pm		Eastern Kentucky	W 78–51	7–1	Chaifetz Arena (516); St. Louis, MO
12/06/2016*; 7:00 pm		Indiana State	L 67–70	7–2	Chaifetz Arena (314); St. Louis, MO
12/15/2016*; 7:00 pm		at Tulsa	L 64–70	7–3	Reynolds Center (207); Tulsa, OK
12/18/2016*; 2:00 pm		Washington State	W 73–70	8–3	Chaifetz Arena (604); St. Louis, MO
12/21/2016*; 7:00 pm		Missouri	W 72–61	9–3	Chaifetz Arena (6,288); St. Louis, MO
12/29/2016*; 6:30 pm, ESPN3		at Lipscomb	W 83–38	10–3	Allen Arena (234); Nashville, TN
Atlantic 10 regular season
12/31/2016; 10:00 am		at Davidson	W 106–69	11–3 (1–0)	John M. Belk Arena (371); Davidson, NC
01/04/2017; 7:00 pm		George Mason	W 89–50	12–3 (2–0)	Chaifetz Arena (1,021); St. Louis, MO
01/08/2017; 12:00 pm, CBSSN		at VCU	W 62–48	13–3 (3–0)	Siegel Center (611); Richmond, VA
01/11/2017; 11:00 am, NBCSN		St. Bonaventure	W 64–49	14–3 (4–0)	Chaifetz Arena (3,581); St. Louis, MO
01/15/2017; 11:00 am, ESPNU		Dayton	L 67–78	14–4 (4–1)	Chaifetz Arena (1,975); St. Louis, MO
01/18/2017; 6:00 pm		at Duquesne	L 65–94	14–5 (4–2)	Palumbo Center (576); Pittsburgh, PA
01/21/2017; 1:00 pm		at Rhode Island	W 68–50	15–5 (5–2)	Ryan Center (658); Kingston, RI
01/26/2017; 7:00 pm		George Washington	W 67–59	16–5 (6–2)	Chaifetz Arena (527); St. Louis, MO
01/28/2017; 7:00 pm		Fordham	W 82–58	17–5 (7–2)	Chaifetz Arena (6,157); St. Louis, MO
02/01/2017; 6:00 pm		at Massachusetts	W 81–60	18–5 (8–2)	Mullins Center (460); Amherst, MA
02/05/2017; 3:00 pm, CBSSN		Saint Joseph's	L 63–66	18–6 (8–3)	Chaifetz Arena (926); St. Louis, MO
02/08/2017; 7:00 pm		VCU	W 77–72	19–6 (9–3)	Chaifetz Arena (511); St. Louis, MO
02/11/2017; 12:00 pm		at St. Bonaventure	W 74–58	20–6 (10–3)	Reilly Center (735); Olean, NY
02/15/2017; 12:00 pm		at La Salle	W 79–74	21–6 (11–3)	Tom Gola Arena (304); Philadelphia, PA
02/18/2017; 7:00 pm		Richmond	W 73–66	22–6 (12–3)	Chaifetz Arena (2,440); St. Louis, MO
02/22/2017; 6:00 pm		at Dayton	L 62–68 ^{OT}	22–7 (12–4)	UD Arena (2,905); Dayton, OH
Atlantic 10 Tournament
02/26/2017; 2:00 pm		Massachusetts; First Round	W 91–51	23–7	Chaifetz Arena (573); St. Louis, MO
03/03/2017; 2:00 pm, ASN		vs. Fordham; Quarterfinals	W 68–58	24–7	Richmond Coliseum; Richmond, VA
03/04/2017; 11:00 am, CBSSN		vs. Dayton; Semifinals	L 65–75	24–8	Richmond Coliseum; Richmond, VA
Women's National Invitation Tournament
03/16/2017*; 8:00 pm		IUPUI; First Round	W 62–57	25–8	Chaifetz Arena (803); St. Louis, MO
03/19/2017*; 2:00 pm		at Indiana; Second Round	L 53–71	25–9	Simon Skjodt Assembly Hall (2,526); Bloomington, IN
*Non-conference game. ^{#}Rankings from AP Poll. (#) Tournament seedings in parentheses. All times are in Central Time.

== Rankings ==
2016–17 NCAA Division I women's basketball rankings

Regular season polls
Poll	Pre- Season	Week 2	Week 3	Week 4	Week 5	Week 6	Week 7	Week 8	Week 9	Week 10	Week 11	Week 12	Week 13	Week 14	Week 15	Week 16	Week 17	Week 18	Week 19	Final
AP	RV	RV	RV	NR	NR	NR	NR	NR	NR	NR	NR	NR								N/A
Coaches	NR	RV	RV	NR	NR	NR	NR	NR	NR	RV	NR	NR								

Legend
	Increase in ranking
	Decrease in ranking
	No change
(RV)	Received votes
(NR)	Not ranked

== See also ==
- 2016–17 Saint Louis Billikens men's basketball team
