= 2016–17 Richmond Spiders women's basketball team =

Intercollegiate basketball season

2016–17 Richmond Spiders women's basketball

FAU Thanksgiving Tournament Champions
- Conference: Atlantic 10 Conference
- Record: 13–17 (7–9 A-10)
- Head coach: Michael Shafer (12th season)
- Assistant coaches: Cori Chambers; John Miller; Kara Powell
- Home arena: Robins Center

2016–17 Atlantic 10 women's basketball standings
	Conf.				Overall
Team	W		L	PCT	W		L	PCT
Dayton †	13	–	3	.813	22	–	10	.688
George Washington	13	–	3	.813	20	–	10	.667
Saint Louis	12	–	4	.750	25	–	9	.735
Saint Joseph's	12	–	4	.750	17	–	15	.531
Fordham	11	–	5	.688	22	–	12	.647
La Salle	9	–	7	.563	17	–	13	.567
Duquesne	8	–	8	.500	18	–	16	.529
VCU	8	–	8	.500	16	–	15	.516
Richmond	7	–	9	.438	13	–	17	.433
George Mason	6	–	10	.375	13	–	17	.433
St. Bonaventure	4	–	12	.250	9	–	20	.310
Davidson	4	–	12	.250	6	–	23	.207
UMass	3	–	13	.188	9	–	21	.300
Rhode Island	2	–	14	.125	6	–	23	.207
† 2017 A10 Tournament winner As of March 20, 2017; Rankings from AP poll

The 2016–17 Richmond Spiders women's basketball team represented the University of Richmond during the 2016–17 NCAA Division I women's basketball season. The Spiders, led by 12th year head coach Michael Shafer, played their home games at the Robins Center and were members of the Atlantic 10 Conference. They finished the season 13–17, 7–9 in A-10 play to finish in ninth place. They lost in the first round of the A-10 women's tournament to VCU.

== 2016–17 media ==
All Spiders games are broadcast on WTVR 6.3 with Robert Fish on the call. The games are also streamed on Spider TV.

== Roster ==
2015–16 Richmond Spiders women's basketball team
Players
Coaches

Pos.	#	Name	Height	Year	Previous school	Hometown
G	0	Kylie Murphree	5 ft 9 in (1.75 m)	So	Fairfax	Fairfax, VA
F	1	Jaide Hinds-Clarke	6 ft 1 in (1.85 m)	Fr	Westwood	Westwood, NJ
G	2	Olivia Healy	5 ft 11 in (1.8 m)	RS Jr	Reading	Reading, PA
G	4	Janelle Hubbard (C)	5 ft 8 in (1.73 m)	Sr	Elizabeth Seton	Glenn Dale, MD
G	10	Dazia Hall	5 ft 9 in (1.75 m)	Sr	The Bullis School	Ashburn, VA
G	11	Micaela Parson	5 ft 7 in (1.7 m)	Jr	Monacan	North Chesterfield, VA
G	13	Taisha Murphy	5 ft 10 in (1.78 m)	So	Clayton	Clayton, NC
F	14	Alicia Hudalla	6 ft 1 in (1.85 m)	Jr	Glen Allen	Glen Allen, VA
F/C	15	Karleigh Wike	6 ft 4 in (1.93 m)	Jr	East Rowan	Salisbury, NC
F	21	Salita Greene	5 ft 11 in (1.8 m)	So	Jordan	Durham, NC
G	23	Lauren Tolson (C)	5 ft 8 in (1.73 m)	RS Sr	Frederick	Frederick, MD
F	24	Tuuli Menna	6 ft 1 in (1.85 m)	So	Mäkelänrintee	Helsinki, Finland
F	33	Amy Duggan	6 ft 0 in (1.83 m)	Fr	Noble and Greenough	Norwood, MA

Head coach

- Michael Shafer (William & Mary)

Assistant coach(es)

- Cori Chambers (Georgia)
- John Miller (Mount St. Mary's)
- Kara Powell (Richmond)

Legend

- (C) Team captain
- (S) Suspended
- (I) Ineligible
- (W) Walk-on
- Injured
- Current redshirt

Roster

== Schedule ==
Date time, TV	Rank^{#}	Opponent^{#}	Result	Record	Site (attendance) city, state
Non-conference regular season
11/13/2016*; 2:00 pm		Columbia	L 58–65	0–1	Robins Center (654); Richmond, VA
11/16/2016*; 7:00 pm, CSNMA+		Virginia	L 56–63	0–2	Robins Center (653); Richmond, VA
11/18/2016*; 7:00 pm		at William & Mary	L 39–67	0–3	Kaplan Arena (467); Williamsburg, VA
11/20/2016*; 5:00 pm		Appalachian State	W 55–46	1–3	Robins Center (473); Richmond, VA
11/25/2016*; 2:30 pm		vs. Florida A&M; FAU Thanksgiving Tournament semifinals	W 64–51	2–3	FAU Arena; Boca Raton, LA
11/26/2016*; 2:30 pm		at Florida Atlantic; FAU Thanksgiving Tournament championship game	W 77–67	3–3	FAU Arena (432); Boca Raton, LA
12/03/2016*; 6:00 pm		vs. Liberty; Navy Classic	W 63–54	4–3	Alumni Hall; Annapolis, MD
12/04/2016*; 2:00 pm		vs. Cleveland State; Navy Classic	L 65–69	4–4	Alumni Hall; Annapolis, MD
12/10/2016*; 2:00 pm		Penn	L 44–47	4–5	Robins Center (623); Richmond, VA
12/15/2016*; 5:30 pm		at Hampton	L 45–72	4–6	Hampton Convocation Center (1,234); Hampton, VA
12/17/2016*; 4:00 pm		East Carolina	L 60–71	4–7	Robins Center (586); Richmond, VA
12/20/2016*; 5:00 pm, ESPN3		at Furman	W 54–48	5–7	Timmons Arena (396); Greenville, SC
12/27/2016*; 6:00 pm		Morgan State	W 54–37	6–7	Robins Center (557); Richmond, VA
Atlantic 10 regular Season
12/31/2016; 2:00 pm		Saint Joseph's	W 70–52	7–7 (1–0)	Robins Center (564); Richmond, VA
01/05/2017; 7:00 pm, CBSSN		at VCU; Capital City Classic	L 55–62	7–8 (1–1)	Siegel Center (1,031); Richmond, VA
01/07/2017; 3:00 pm		St. Bonaventure	W 61–54	8–8 (2–1)	Robins Center (547); Richmond, VA
01/11/2017; 12:00 pm		at Fordham	L 41–67	8–9 (2–2)	Rose Hill Gymnasium (2,175); Bronx, NY
01/14/2017; 2:00 pm		at Rhode Island	W 58–53	9–9 (3–2)	Ryan Center (391); Kingston, RI
01/18/2017; 7:00 pm		La Salle	L 58–63	9–10 (3–3)	Robins Center (430); Richmond, VA
01/22/2017; 5:00 pm, ASN		George Mason	L 50–54	9–11 (3–4)	Robins Center (504); Richmond, VA
01/25/2017; 7:00 pm		at Duquesne	L 61–73	9–12 (3–5)	Palumbo Center (777); Pittsburgh, PA
01/28/2017; 2:00 pm		at Davidson	W 61–52	10–12 (4–5)	John M. Belk Arena (335); Davidson, NC
01/31/2017; 7:00 pm		VCU; Capital City Classic	L 55–57	10–13 (4–6)	Robins Center (1,205); Richmond, VA
02/05/2017; 1:00 pm		Rhode Island	W 67–51	11–13 (5–6)	Robins Center (586); Richmond, VA
02/08/2017; 7:00 pm		at Dayton	L 39–55	11–14 (5–7)	UD Arena (1,882); Dayton, OH
02/12/2017; 2:00 pm		at George Mason	W 70–58	12–14 (6–7)	EagleBank Arena (1,710); Fairfax, VA
02/15/2017; 7:00 pm		Massachusetts	W 56–45	13–14 (7–7)	Robins Center (537); Richmond, VA
02/18/2017; 8:00 pm		at Saint Louis	L 66–73	13–15 (7–8)	Chaifetz Arena (2,440); St. Louis, MO
02/22/2017; 7:00 pm		George Washington	L 44–63	13–16 (7–9)	Robins Center (751); Richmond, VA
Atlantic 10 Tournament
02/26/2017; 1:00 pm		at VCU; First Round	L 64–72	13–17	Siegel Center (530); Richmond, VA
*Non-conference game. ^{#}Rankings from AP Poll. (#) Tournament seedings in parentheses. All times are in Eastern Time.

== Rankings ==
2016–17 NCAA Division I women's basketball rankings

Regular season polls
Poll	Pre- Season	Week 2	Week 3	Week 4	Week 5	Week 6	Week 7	Week 8	Week 9	Week 10	Week 11	Week 12	Week 13	Week 14	Week 15	Week 16	Week 17	Week 18	Week 19	Final
AP																				N/A
Coaches																				

Legend
	Increase in ranking
	Decrease in ranking
	No change
(RV)	Received votes
(NR)	Not ranked

== See also ==
- 2016–17 Richmond Spiders men's basketball team
