= 2016–17 Fordham Rams women's basketball team =

Intercollegiate basketball season

2016–17 Fordham Rams women's basketball

WNIT, Second Round
- Conference: Atlantic 10 Conference
- Record: 22–12 (11–5 A-10)
- Head coach: Stephanie Gaitley (6th season)
- Assistant coaches: Angelika Szumilo; Jenna Cosgrove; Katelyn Linney
- Home arena: Rose Hill Gymnasium

2016–17 Atlantic 10 women's basketball standings
	Conf.				Overall
Team	W		L	PCT	W		L	PCT
Dayton †	13	–	3	.813	22	–	10	.688
George Washington	13	–	3	.813	20	–	10	.667
Saint Louis	12	–	4	.750	25	–	9	.735
Saint Joseph's	12	–	4	.750	17	–	15	.531
Fordham	11	–	5	.688	22	–	12	.647
La Salle	9	–	7	.563	17	–	13	.567
Duquesne	8	–	8	.500	18	–	16	.529
VCU	8	–	8	.500	16	–	15	.516
Richmond	7	–	9	.438	13	–	17	.433
George Mason	6	–	10	.375	13	–	17	.433
St. Bonaventure	4	–	12	.250	9	–	20	.310
Davidson	4	–	12	.250	6	–	23	.207
UMass	3	–	13	.188	9	–	21	.300
Rhode Island	2	–	14	.125	6	–	23	.207
† 2017 A10 Tournament winner As of March 20, 2017; Rankings from AP poll

The 2016–17 Fordham Rams women's basketball team represented Fordham University during the 2016–17 NCAA Division I women's basketball season. The Rams were led by sixth-year head coach Stephanie Gaitley. They were members of the Atlantic 10 Conference and played their home games at the Rose Hill Gymnasium. They finished the season 22–12, 11–5 in A-10 play to finish in fifth place. They advanced to the quarterfinals of the A-10 women's tournament, where they lost to Saint Louis. They were invited to the Women's National Invitation Tournament, where they defeated Georgetown in the first round before losing to Penn State in the second round.

== 2016–17 media ==
=== Fordham Rams Sports Network ===
Fordham Rams games will be broadcast on WFUV Sports and streamed online through the Fordham Portal. Most home games will also be featured on the A-10 Digital Network. Select games will be televised.

== Roster ==
2016–17 Fordham Rams women's basketball team
Players
Coaches

Pos.	#	Name	Height	Year	Previous school	Hometown
G	2	Lauren Holden	5 ft 5 in (1.65 m)	So	Lower Cape May Regional	Cape May, NJ
G	3	Tiffany Suarez	5 ft 11 in (1.8 m)	RS Jr	Our Lady of Lourdes; Virginia	Miami, FL
F	5	G'mrice Davis	6 ft 2 in (1.88 m)	So	Girard College	Philadelphia, PA
G	10	Breanna Cavanaugh	5 ft 8 in (1.73 m)	RS Fr	Blair Academy; California	Allamuchy, NJ
G	11	Monika Radomska	5 ft 11 in (1.8 m)	Jr	John Paul II; Casper College	Wołomin, Poland
G	12	Asnate Fomina	5 ft 8 in (1.73 m)	Jr	Riga Secondary School No. 49	Riga, Latvia
F	14	Danielle Padovano	6 ft 0 in (1.83 m)	Sr	South Brunswick	Dayton, NJ
F	21	Nicole Floyd	6 ft 2 in (1.88 m)	Fr	Stonewall Jackson	Manassas, VA
G/F	22	Danielle Burns	5 ft 10 in (1.78 m)	Sr	Stonewall Jackson	Gainesville, VA
G	23	Anna Kelly	5 ft 6 in (1.68 m)	Fr	Lexington	Lexington, MA
G	25	Hannah Missry	5 ft 8 in (1.73 m)	Sr	Jackson Memorial	Jackson, NJ
F	35	Kate Krēsliņa	6 ft 0 in (1.83 m)	So	XXXX	Riga, Latvia
F	40	Nicole Floyd (I) (redshirt)	6 ft 2 in (1.88 m)	RS So	Stonewall Jackson; Wake Forest	Manassas, VA
F	42	Kristen Ryan	6 ft 1 in (1.85 m)	So	Archbishop John Carroll	Malvern, PA

Head coach

- Stephanie Gaitley (Villanova)

Assistant coach(es)

- Angelika Szumilo (LIU Brooklyn)
- Jenna Cosgrove (Endicott)
- Katelyn Linney (Fairfield)

Legend

- (C) Team captain
- (S) Suspended
- (I) Ineligible
- (W) Walk-on
- Injured
- Current redshirt

Roster

== Schedule ==
Date time, TV	Rank^{#}	Opponent^{#}	Result	Record	Site (attendance) city, state
Exhibition
11/04/2016*; 7:00 pm		Muhlenberg	W 74–50		Rose Hill Gymnasium; Bronx, NY
Regular season
11/11/2016*; 7:00 pm		Furman; Preseason WNIT First Round	W 60–47	1–0	Rose Hill Gymnasium (1,326); Bronx, NY
11/14/2016*; 7:00 pm, ACCN Extra		at No. 1 Notre Dame; Preseason WNIT quarterfinals	L 36–67	1–1	Edmund P. Joyce Center (7,435); South Bend, IN
11/19/2016*; 12:00 pm		Little Rock; Preseason WNIT consolation round	W 65–43	2–1	Rose Hill Gymnasium (1,473); Bronx, NY
11/22/2016*; 7:00 pm		Albany	W 89–82 ^{2OT}	3–1	Rose Hill Gymnasium (381); Bronx, NY
11/25/2016*; 2:00 pm		vs. Texas Tech; Miami Thanksgiving Tournament semifinals	L 50–59	3–2	BankUnited Center (725); Coral Gables, FL
11/27/2016*; 2:00 pm		vs. Grambling State; Miami Thanksgiving Tournament 3rd place game	W 59–53	4–2	BankUnited Center (722); Coral Gables, FL
12/01/2016; 7:00 pm		Duquesne	W 64–51	5–2 (1–0)	Rose Hill Gymnasium (297); Bronx, NY
12/04/2016*; 2:00 pm		Boston College	W 56–49	6–2	Rose Hill Gymnasium (811); Bronx, NY
12/07/2016*; 4:00 pm, ESPN3		at Iona	L 46–55	6–3	Hynes Athletic Center (524); New Rochelle, NY
12/10/2016*; 2:00 pm		Princeton	W 57–55	7–3	Rose Hill Gymnasium (806); Bronx, NY
12/13/2016*; 7:00 pm		St. John's; Rivalry	L 45–59	7–4	Rose Hill Gymnasium (351); Bronx, NY
12/17/2016*; 5:00 pm		Manhattan; Battle of the Bronx	W 63–60	8–4	Rose Hill Gymnasium (524); Bronx, NY
12/22/2016*; 2:00 pm		Niagara	W 92–69	9–4	Rose Hill Gymnasium (302); Bronx, NY
12/29/2016*; 12:00 pm		Buffalo; Fordham Holiday Classic semifinals	L 54–58	9–5	Rose Hill Gymnasium (921); Bronx, NY
12/30/2016*; 12:00 pm		UNC Asheville; Fordham Holiday Classic 3rd place	W 55–42	10–5	Rose Hill Gymnasium; Bronx, NY
01/01/2017; 2:00 pm		at Rhode Island	W 74–69	11–5 (2–0)	Ryan Center (485); Kingston, RI
01/04/2017; 7:00 pm		Davidson	W 85–72	12–5 (3–0)	Rose Hill Gymnasium (432); Bronx, NY
01/07/2017; 1:00 pm		at George Mason	W 53–49	13–5 (4–0)	EagleBank Arena (654); Fairfax, VA
01/11/2017; 12:00 pm		Richmond	W 67–41	14–5 (5–0)	Rose Hill Gymnasium (2,175); Bronx, NY
01/15/2017; 1:00 pm		at St. Bonaventure	W 60–44	15–5 (6–0)	Reilly Center (885); Olean, NY
01/18/2017; 7:00 pm		at Saint Joseph's	L 44–47	15–6 (6–1)	Hagan Arena (914); Philadelphia, PA
01/21/2017; 2:00 pm		VCU	L 58–61	15–7 (6–2)	Rose Hill Gymnasium (892); Bronx, NY
01/28/2017; 7:00 pm		at Saint Louis	L 58–82	15–8 (6–3)	Chaifetz Arena (6,157); St. Louis, MO
02/01/2017; 12:00 pm, NBCSN		at George Washington	L 46–63	15–9 (6–4)	Charles E. Smith Center (1,919); Washington, D.C.
02/04/2017; 2:00 pm		St. Bonaventure	W 57–45	16–9 (7–4)	Rose Hill Gymnasium (681); Bronx, NY
02/09/2017; 7:00 pm		Saint Joseph's	W 44–39	17–9 (8–4)	Rose Hill Gymnasium (403); Bronx, NY
02/11/2017; 2:00 pm		Massachusetts	W 74–43	18–9 (9–4)	Rose Hill Gymnasium (797); Bronx, NY
02/14/2017; 7:00 pm		at Davidson	L 51–52	18–10 (9–5)	John M. Belk Arena (473); Davidson, NC
02/19/2017; 2:00 pm, NBCSN		Dayton	W 66–52	19–10 (10–5)	Rose Hill Gymnasium (921); Bronx, NY
02/22/2017; 7:00 pm		at La Salle	W 66–61 ^{OT}	20–10 (11–5)	Tom Gola Arena (402); Philadelphia, PA
Atlantic 10 Women's Tournament
02/26/2017; 2:00 pm		Davidson; First Round	W 62–54	21–10	Rose Hill Gymnasium (890); Bronx, NY
03/03/2017; 2:00 pm, ASN		vs. Saint Louis; Quarterfinals	L 58–68	21–11	Richmond Coliseum; Richmond, VA
WNIT
03/17/2017*; 7:00 pm		at Georgetown; First Round	W 60–49	22–11	McDonough Gymnasium (278); Washington, D.C.
03/19/2017*; 2:00 pm		at Penn State; Second Round	L 51–70	22–12	Bryce Jordan Center (1,127); University Park, PA
*Non-conference game. ^{#}Rankings from AP Poll. (#) Tournament seedings in parentheses. All times are in Eastern Time.

== Rankings ==
Regular season polls
Poll	Pre- Season	Week 2	Week 3	Week 4	Week 5	Week 6	Week 7	Week 8	Week 9	Week 10	Week 11	Week 12	Week 13	Week 14	Week 15	Week 16	Week 17	Week 18	Final
AP																			
Coaches																			

Legend
	Increase in ranking
	Decrease in ranking
	Not ranked previous week
(RV)	Received Votes

== See also ==
- 2016–17 Fordham Rams men's basketball team
