= 2016–17 Drake Bulldogs women's basketball team =

Intercollegiate basketball season

2016–17 Drake Bulldogs women's basketball

MVC Regular Season and Tournament Champions

NCAA tournament, first round
- Conference: Missouri Valley Conference

Ranking
- Coaches: No. 24
- AP: No. 20
- Record: 28–5 (18–0 The Valley)
- Head coach: Jennie Baranczyk (5th season)
- Assistant coaches: Allison Pohlman; Nicci Hays Fort; Markisha Wright
- Home arena: Knapp Center

2016–17 Missouri Valley Conference women's basketball standings
	Conf.				Overall
Team	W		L	PCT	W		L	PCT
No. 20 Drake †	18	–	0	1.000	28	–	4	.875
Northern Iowa	15	–	3	.833	24	–	8	.750
Missouri State	12	–	6	.667	16	–	14	.533
Southern Illinois	10	–	8	.556	16	–	15	.516
Wichita State	9	–	9	.500	15	–	16	.484
Evansville	8	–	10	.444	14	–	17	.452
Bradley	7	–	11	.389	12	–	19	.387
Indiana State	6	–	12	.333	12	–	18	.400
Illinois State	4	–	14	.222	8	–	23	.258
Loyola–Chicago	1	–	17	.056	2	–	28	.067
† 2017 MVC tournament winner As of March 15, 2017; Rankings from AP poll

The 2016–17 Drake Bulldogs women's basketball team represented Drake University during the 2016–17 NCAA Division I women's basketball season. The Bulldogs, led by fifth-year head coach Jennie Baranczyk, played their home games at Knapp Center and were members of the Missouri Valley Conference. They finished the season 28–5, 18–0 in MVC play to win the MVC regular season championship. They defeated Illinois State, Wichita State and Northern Iowa to become champions of the Missouri Valley women's tournament. They earned an automatic trip to the NCAA women's tournament for the first time since 2007, where they were defeated by Kansas State in the first round.

== Roster ==
2016–17 Drake Bulldogs women's basketball team
Players
Coaches

Pos.	#	Name	Height	Year	Previous school	Hometown
F	3	Lizzy Wendell	6 ft 0 in (1.83 m)	Sr	Blue Springs	Blue Springs, MO
G	5	Becca Hittner	6 ft 0 in (1.83 m)	Fr	Dowling Catholic	Urbandale, IA
G/F	12	Brenni Rose	6 ft 0 in (1.83 m)	Fr	Shawnee Mission Northwest	Shawnee, KS
G	15	Paige Greiner	5 ft 5 in (1.65 m)	Jr	Williamsburg	Williamsburg, IA
G	20	Maddy Dean	5 ft 9 in (1.75 m)	Jr	Jordan	Jordan, MN
G	21	Sammie Bachrodt	5 ft 10 in (1.78 m)	So	Kapaun Mt. Carmel	Wichita, KS
G	22	Caitlin Ingle	5 ft 8 in (1.73 m)	Sr	Southeast Polk	Runnells, IA
G	24	Nicole Miller	5 ft 9 in (1.75 m)	So	North Linn	Walker, IA
G	34	Cortni Rush	5 ft 10 in (1.78 m)	Sr	Mason City; North Iowa Area	Mason City, IA
F/C	35	Becca Jonas	6 ft 2 in (1.88 m)	RS So	Truman	Independence, MO
F/C	40	Mya Mertz	6 ft 2 in (1.88 m)	Fr	Blue Valley Northwest	Overland Park, KS
F	50	Sara Rhine	6 ft 1 in (1.85 m)	So	Eldon	Eldon, MO

Head coach

- Jennie Baranczyk (Iowa)

Assistant coach(es)

- Allison Pohlman (Northern Iowa)
- Nicci Hays Fort (Loyola (MD))
- Markisha Wright (Notre Dame)

Legend

- (C) Team captain
- (S) Suspended
- (I) Ineligible
- (W) Walk-on
- Injured
- Current redshirt

Roster

== Schedule ==
Date time, TV	Rank^{#}	Opponent^{#}	Result	Record	High points	High rebounds	High assists	Site (attendance) city, state
Exhibition
11/01/2016*; 7:00 pm, ESPN3		Winona State	W 74–63		22 – Wendell	11 – Rhine	8 – Ingle	Knapp Center (1,836); Des Moines, IA
11/05/2016*; 2:00 pm, ESPN3		Simpson	W 106–62		25 – Wendell	11 – Bachrodt	13 – Ingle	Knapp Center (1,833); Des Moines, IA
Non-conference regular season
11/11/2016*; 3:00 pm		at North Dakota	W 99–91	1–0	34 – Wendell	9 – Wendell	13 – Ingle	Betty Engelstad Sioux Center (2,362); Grand Forks, ND
11/17/2016*; 7:00 pm		at Creighton	L 77–80	1–1	20 – Ingle	7 – Wendell	7 – Wendell	D. J. Sokol Arena (847); Omaha, NE
11/20/2016*; 2:00 pm		at Iowa State	L 67–75	1–2	20 – Wendell	13 – Rhine	6 – Ingle	Hilton Coliseum (6,790); Ames, IA
11/27/2016*; 2:00 pm, ESPN3		Wyoming	W 63–50	2–2	18 – Wendell	5 – Miller, Rush	5 – Wendell	Knapp Center (2,153); Des Moines, IA
11/30/2016*; 7:00 pm, ESPN3		Northern Illinois	W 95–86	3–2	30 – Wendell	8 – Bachrodt	11 – Ingle	Knapp Center (2,016); Des Moines, IA
12/03/2016*; 1:00 pm, ESPN3		at Green Bay	L 48–71	3–3	12 – Wendell, Bachrodt	7 – Bachrodt	7 – Ingle	Kress Events Center (2,299); Green Bay, WI
12/06/2016*; 7:00 pm		at Nebraska	W 84–70	4–3	18 – Wendell	7 – Wendell	13 – Ingle	Pinnacle Bank Arena (4,200); Lincoln, NE
12/08/2016*; 11:00 am, ESPN3		Clarke	W 118–43	5–3	25 – Wendell	7 – Bachrodt	11 – Ingle	Knapp Center (4,369); Des Moines, IA
12/18/2016*; 2:00 pm, MC22		Iowa	W 81–76	6–3	20 – Ingle	10 – Hittner	7 – Ingle	Knapp Center (3,307); Des Moines, IA
12/21/2016*; 3:00 pm		vs. Auburn; Tulane Classic semifinals	L 80–85	6–4	25 – Wendell	7 – Wendell	4 – Ingle, Hittner	Devlin Fieldhouse (439); New Orleans, LA
12/22/2016*; 3:00 pm		vs. Eastern Washington; Tulane Classic 3rd place game	W 93–78	7–4	24 – Jonas	9 – Hittner	7 – Ingle	Devlin Fieldhouse (529); New Orleans, LA
Missouri Valley Conference regular season
12/30/2016; 7:00 pm, ESPN3		at Wichita State	W 83–78	8–4 (1–0)	32 – Wendell	5 – Wendell	8 – Ingle	Charles Koch Arena (1,670); Wichita, KS
01/01/2017; 2:00 pm, ESPN3		at Missouri State	W 90–64	9–4 (2–0)	22 – Wendell	10 – Jonas	15 – Ingle	JQH Arena (2,351); Springfield, MO
01/06/2017; 7:00 pm, ESPN3		Evansville	W 82–65	10–4 (3–0)	23 – Wendell	8 – Hittner, Jonas	6 – Ingle	Knapp Center (2,106); Des Moines, IA
01/08/2017; 2:00 pm, ESPN3		Southern Illinois	W 75–59	11–4 (4–0)	24 – Wendell	6 – Hittner	6 – Ingle	Knapp Center (2,252); Des Moines, IA
01/13/2017; 7:00 pm, ESPN3		at Bradley	W 93–60	12–4 (5–0)	24 – Wendell	8 – Rose	12 – Ingle	Renaissance Coliseum (610); Peoria, IL
01/15/2017; 2:00 pm, ESPN3		at Illinois State	W 87–36	13–4 (6–0)	17 – Wendell	7 – Jonas	5 – Greiner, Ingle, Wendell	Redbird Arena (518); Normal, IL
01/20/2017; 7:00 pm, ESPN3		Loyola–Chicago	W 89–46	14–4 (7–0)	25 – Wendell	10 – Hittner	6 – Bachrodt	Knapp Center (2,129); Des Moines, IA
01/22/2017; 2:00 pm, ESPN3		Indiana State	W 76–62	15–4 (8–0)	29 – Wendell	9 – Hittner	9 – Ingle	Knapp Center (2,560); Des Moines, IA
01/27/2017; 7:00 pm, ESPN3		at Northern Iowa	W 88–79 ^{2OT}	16–4 (9–0)	18 – Jonas	12 – Jonas	8 – Ingle	McLeod Center (4,027); Cedar Falls, IA
02/03/2017; 7:00 pm, ESPN3		at Southern Illinois	W 71–60	17–4 (10–0)	21 – Windell	8 – Jonas	5 – Miller	SIU Arena (706); Carbondale, IL
02/05/2017; 2:00 pm, ESPN3		at Evansville	W 73–48	18–4 (11–0)	13 – Bachrodt	14 – Jonas	6 – Ingle	Ford Center (588); Evansville, IN
02/10/2017; 7:00 pm, ESPN3		Illinois State	W 101–49	19–4 (12–0)	22 – Wendell	7 – Hittner	10 – Ingle	Knapp Center (2,563); Des Moines, IA
02/12/2017; 2:00 pm, ESPN3		Bradley	W 98–46	20–4 (13–0)	20 – Wendell	7 – Miller	7 – Ingle	Knapp Center (3,219); Des Moines, IA
02/17/2017; 6:00 pm, ESPN3	No. 25	at Indiana State	W 64–45	21–4 (14–0)	14 – Rose	7 – Jonas	4 – Ingle	Hulman Center (1,777); Terre Haute, IN
02/19/2017; 1:00 pm, ESPN3	No. 25	at Loyola–Chicago	W 86–42	22–4 (15–0)	19 – Wendell	10 – Hittner	7 – Wendell	Joseph J. Gentile Arena (298); Chicago, IL
02/24/2017; 7:00 pm, ESPN3	No. 21	Northern Iowa	W 70–57	23–4 (16–0)	21 – Wendell	6 – Bachrodt, Ingle	8 – Ingle	Knapp Center (6,456); Des Moines, IA
03/02/2017; 7:00 pm, ESPN3	No. 22	Missouri State	W 98–91	24–4 (17–0)	22 – Hittner	5 – Hittner, Rose	8 – Ingle, Wendell	Knapp Center (2,448); Des Moines, IA
03/04/2017; 2:00 pm, MC22	No. 22	Wichita State	W 105–89	25–4 (18–0)	25 – Wendell	6 – Hittner, Jonas	8 – Ingle	Knapp Center (3,271); Des Moines, IA
Missouri Valley Women's Tournament
03/10/2017; 12:05 pm, ESPN3	(1) No. 20	vs. (9) Illinois State; Quarterfinals	W 64–40	26–4	17 – Wendell	5 – Ingle	6 – Ingle	iWireless Center; Moline, IL
03/11/2017; 1:30 pm, ESPN3	(1) No. 20	vs. (5) Wichita State; Semifinals	W 86–68	27–4	34 – Wendell	7 – Hittner, Wendell	11 – Ingle	iWireless Center; Moline, IL
03/12/2017; 2:00 pm, ESPN3	(1) No. 20	vs. (2) Northern Iowa; Championship Game	W 74–69 ^{OT}	28–4	22 – Ingle	11 – Jonas	7 – Ingle	iWireless Center (2,451); Moline, IL
NCAA tournament
03/18/2017; 3:00 pm, ESPN2	(10 L) No. 20	at (7 L) No. 24 Kansas State; First Round	L 54–67	28–5	17 – Wendell	5 – Bachrodt	7 – Ingle	Bramlage Coliseum (4,005); Manhattan, KS
*Non-conference game. ^{#}Rankings from AP Poll. (#) Tournament seedings in parentheses. L=Lexington Region. All times are in Central Time.

== Rankings ==
Regular season polls
Poll	Pre- season	Week 2	Week 3	Week 4	Week 5	Week 6	Week 7	Week 8	Week 9	Week 10	Week 11	Week 12	Week 13	Week 14	Week 15	Week 16	Week 17	Week 18	Week 19	Final
AP	NR	NR	NR	NR	NR	NR	NR	NR	NR	NR	RV	RV	RV	RV	25	21	22	20	20	N/A
Coaches	RV	RV	NR	NR	NR	NR	NR	NR	NR	NR	NR	NR	NR	RV	RV	22	22	19	18	24

Legend
	Increase in ranking
	Decrease in ranking
	Not ranked previous week
(RV)	Received votes

== See also ==
- 2016–17 Drake Bulldogs men's basketball team
