= Fluharty =

Fluharty is a surname. Notable people with the surname include:

- Mason Fluharty (born 2001), American baseball player
- Shawn Fluharty (born 1984), American politician
- Thomas Fluharty (born 1962), American illustrator and art educator
