= Prior Lake, Minnesota =

City in Minnesota, United States

Prior Lake
- City
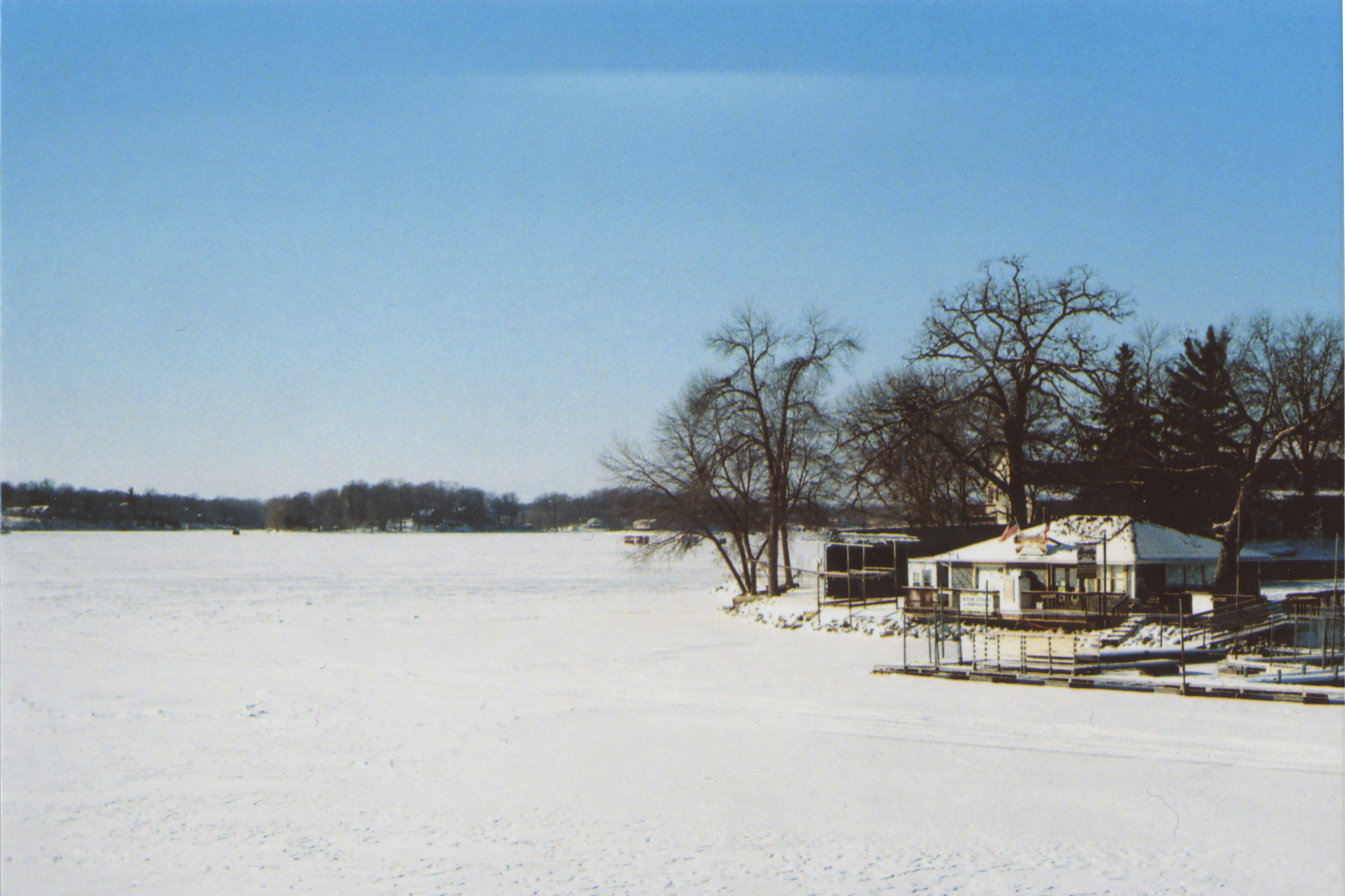
- View of Prior Lake during winter

- Flag

- Location of the city of Prior Lake within Scott County, Minnesota
- Coordinates: 44°43′29″N 93°26′30″W
- Country: United States
- State: Minnesota
- County: Scott
- Founded: 1872
- Incorporated (village): February 11, 1891
- Incorporated (city): June 1, 1921

Government
  - Mayor: Kirt Briggs
  - City Manager: Jason Wedel

Area
  - City: 19.53 sq mi (50.57 km^{2})
  - Land: 16.28 sq mi (42.16 km^{2})
  - Water: 3.25 sq mi (8.41 km^{2}) 15.77%
- Elevation: 929 ft (283 m)

Population (2020)
  - City: 27,617
  - Estimate (2022): 28,133
  - Density: 1,696.7/sq mi (655.09/km^{2})
  - Metro: 3,693,729
- Time zone: UTC-6 (Central)
  - Summer (DST): UTC-5 (CDT)
- ZIP code: 55372
- Area code: 952
- FIPS code: 27-52594
- GNIS feature ID: 2396284
- Website: priorlakemn.gov

Prior Lake is an exurban city 20 miles (32 km) southwest of Minneapolis, next to Savage and Shakopee in Scott County in the U.S. state of Minnesota. Surrounding the shores of Lower and Upper Prior Lake, the city is south of the Minnesota River in an area known as RiverSouth and establishes the urban fringe of the south-southwest portion of Minneapolis-St. Paul, the 16th-largest metropolitan area in the United States. The population was 27,617 at the 2020 census.

Prior Lake was incorporated as a village in 1891. It is one of the oldest cities in the south metro area. The city's modern rapid growth is due in part to the ease of access for commuters to the rest of the region, via the upgraded State Highway 13.

== Geography ==
According to the United States Census Bureau, the city has an area of 18.33 square miles (47.47 km^{2}); 15.44 square miles (39.99 km^{2}) is land and 2.89 square miles (7.49 km^{2}) is water.

Upper Prior Lake and Lower Prior Lake sit at the city's center in an elongated shape to the southwest to Spring Lake. Prior Lake as a whole is the southern metro area's largest lake.

=== Lakes ===
The nearby Dakota people called Prior Lake Bdé Mayá Thó ("Lake of the Blue Banks").

Prior Lake (renamed after Charles Prior, of the Chicago, Milwaukee and St. Paul railroad) is made up of two sections, Upper Prior Lake and Lower Prior Lake. The area of each is 354 and 810 acres (3.3 km^{2}), respectively. Upper Prior Lake flows northerly, draining into the larger Lower Prior Lake via a navigable channel that runs under Eagle Creek Avenue (Scott County Highway 21). The lake is popular for fishing, water sports, and snowmobiling, and is accessible by the Scott County Snowmobile Trail and other designated trails. In 2009, zebra mussel shells were discovered on the shore of Lower Prior Lake and the DNR confirmed that they were also in Upper Prior Lake.

The eastern part of Spring Lake along Scott County Road 12 is also within the city of Prior Lake. Spring Lake, with 290 acres, offers similar recreational opportunities as Upper Prior Lake with a more rural character and less traffic. Several feet higher in elevation, Spring Lake flows north into Upper Prior Lake via a non-navigable spillway and culvert under County Road 12.

== Demographics ==
Historical population
Census	Pop.	Note	%±
1900	148		—
1910	162		9.5%
1920	246		51.9%
1930	266		8.1%
1940	349		31.2%
1950	536		53.6%
1960	848		58.2%
1970	1,114		31.4%
1980	7,284		553.9%
1990	11,482		57.6%
2000	15,917		38.6%
2010	22,796		43.2%
2020	27,617		21.1%
2022 (est.)	28,133		1.9%
U.S. Decennial Census; 2020 Census

=== 2020 census ===
As of the 2020 census, Prior Lake had a population of 27,617 and 10,350 households. The median age was 40.0 years. 26.0% of residents were under the age of 18 and 14.6% of residents were 65 years of age or older. For every 100 females there were 95.4 males, and for every 100 females age 18 and over there were 93.9 males age 18 and over.

98.9% of residents lived in urban areas, while 1.1% lived in rural areas.

There were 10,350 households in Prior Lake, of which 37.4% had children under the age of 18 living in them. Of all households, 59.2% were married-couple households, 13.9% were households with a male householder and no spouse or partner present, and 20.8% were households with a female householder and no spouse or partner present. About 22.0% of all households were made up of individuals and 9.8% had someone living alone who was 65 years of age or older.

There were 10,845 housing units, of which 4.6% were vacant. The homeowner vacancy rate was 0.6% and the rental vacancy rate was 8.3%.

Racial composition as of the 2020 census
Race	Number	Percent
White	23,026	83.4%
Black or African American	761	2.8%
American Indian and Alaska Native	579	2.1%
Asian	1,303	4.7%
Native Hawaiian and Other Pacific Islander	14	0.1%
Some other race	315	1.1%
Two or more races	1,619	5.9%
Hispanic or Latino (of any race)	919	3.3%

=== 2010 census ===
As of the census of 2010, there were 22,796 people, 8,447 households, and 6,211 families residing in the city. The population density was 1,476.4 inhabitants per square mile (570.0/km^{2}). There were 8,882 housing units at an average density of 575.3 per square mile (222.1/km^{2}). The racial makeup of the city was 91.0% White, 1.5% African American, 1.6% Native American, 3.0% Asian, 0.5% from other races, and 2.4% from two or more races. Hispanic or Latino of any race were 2.1% of the population.

There were 8,447 households, of which 40.1% had children under the age of 18 living with them, 61.3% were married couples living together, 8.1% had a female householder with no husband present, 4.1% had a male householder with no wife present, and 26.5% were non-families. 20.7% of all households were made up of individuals, and 6.7% had someone living alone who was 65 years of age or older. The average household size was 2.69 and the average family size was 3.14.

The median age in the city was 37.8 years. 28.6% of residents were under the age of 18; 5.9% were between the ages of 18 and 24; 28.9% were from 25 to 44; 27.4% were from 45 to 64; and 9.3% were 65 years of age or older. The gender makeup of the city was 49.7% male and 50.3% female.

== Government ==
Prior Lake is governed by a mayor and four council members serving at large. These offices are nonpartisan. The mayor is Kirt Briggs. He succeeded Ken Hedberg, who won an uncontested election in 2012, succeeding Mike Myser. The council members are Zach Braid, Kim Churchill, Victor Lake and Ethan Hellier. The city is run by a city manager, Jason Wedel. Prior Lake is in Minnesota Legislative District 54B. The State Senate District 54 senator is Eric Pratt. The district 54B representative is Ben Bakeberg.

Prior Lake is in Minnesota's 2nd congressional district, represented by Angie Craig.

Parts of the Shakopee Mdewakanton Sioux Community (SMSC) tribal lands are within the boundary of the City of Prior Lake as annexed in 1972. The SMSC is a federally recognized, sovereign Native American tribe of Mdewakanton Dakota people. The overlap of a Minnesota Statutory City with federally recognized tribal lands resulted in litigation to clarify the boundary and voting rights. In 1984, the United States District Court affirmed that Prior Lake's municipal boundary did include the tribal lands in question. The Court further clarified that the tribal residents were thus residents of the city and entitled to vote in municipal elections and to emergency police, fire, and rescue services. The Court ordered the city to provide equal emergency services to the tribal residents even though the tribal lands' federal trust status deprives the city of the authority to tax the lands. In recent years, the SMSC has voluntarily contributed funds to the City of Prior Lake in support of public safety services.

== Arts and culture ==
The Prior Lake American was the main city newspaper, but ceased publication after its final issue on April 27, 2024. The Savage Pacer is commonly read in Prior Lake. The Star Tribune South Edition also offers some coverage.

The Mystic Showroom at the Mystic Lake Casino Hotel in Prior Lake is an entertainment venue that frequently features A-list musical and comedy performers.

== Education ==
After the 1999 Columbine High School Massacre, journalist Elinor Burkett spent a year following students and teachers at Prior Lake High School. She chose Prior Lake because it was virtually identical to Columbine demographically. She documented her experience in the book Another Planet: A Year in the Life of a Suburban High School (ISBN 0-06-050585-0).

The City of Prior Lake is within the Prior Lake-Savage School District. Prior Lake-Savage Area Schools (PLSAS) serve students in Prior Lake, Savage, Credit River Township, Spring Lake Township, Sand Creek Township, and Cedar Lake Township.

- Prior Lake High School
- Bridges Alternative Learning Center
- Hidden Oaks Middle School
- Twin Oaks Middle School
- Edgewood School
- Five Hawks Elementary
- Glendale Elementary
- Grainwood Elementary
- Hamilton Ridge Elementary
- Jeffers Pond Elementary
- Westwood Elementary
- Redtail Ridge Elementary
- SAGE Academy
- La Ola De Lago (Spanish immersion school in Edgewood school)

Prior Lake also has a private Roman Catholic parochial school, St. Michael Catholic School, which serves grades PreK through 8, and a Missouri Synod Lutheran church parochial school, St. Paul's Lutheran School Prior Lake, which serves children from infants through grade 8.

== Notable people ==
- Brock Boeser, professional hockey player
- Kylie Bunbury, model and actress
- Teal Bunbury, soccer player
- Angie Craig, U.S. representative
- Thomas Fluharty, illustrator
- Terry D. Johnston, businesswoman and Minnesota state senator
- Becca Kufrin, television personality
- Richard J. Menke, lawyer and Minnesota state legislator
- Eric Pratt, Minnesota state senator
- Chloe Radcliffe, stand up comedian
- John Robert Roach, archbishop of St. Paul-Minneapolis (1975–1995), born in Prior Lake
- Jessica Scheu, Miss Minnesota 2015
- Jordan Schroeder, professional hockey player
- Tiffany Stratton, professional wrestler and former WWE Women's Champion.
- Heath Voss, professional motocross racer
- Erik Westrum, professional hockey player
