= 2016–17 Illinois State Redbirds women's basketball team =

Intercollegiate basketball season

2016–17 Illinois State Redbirds women's basketball
- Conference: Missouri Valley Conference
- Record: 8–23 (5–13 The Valley)
- Head coach: Barb Smith (4th season)
- Assistant coaches: Lisa Hayden; Cathy Boswell; Brittney Marshall
- Home arena: Redbird Arena

2016–17 Missouri Valley Conference women's basketball standings
	Conf.				Overall
Team	W		L	PCT	W		L	PCT
No. 20 Drake †	18	–	0	1.000	28	–	4	.875
Northern Iowa	15	–	3	.833	24	–	8	.750
Missouri State	12	–	6	.667	16	–	14	.533
Southern Illinois	10	–	8	.556	16	–	15	.516
Wichita State	9	–	9	.500	15	–	16	.484
Evansville	8	–	10	.444	14	–	17	.452
Bradley	7	–	11	.389	12	–	19	.387
Indiana State	6	–	12	.333	12	–	18	.400
Illinois State	4	–	14	.222	8	–	23	.258
Loyola–Chicago	1	–	17	.056	2	–	28	.067
† 2017 MVC tournament winner As of March 15, 2017; Rankings from AP poll

The 2016–17 Illinois State Redbirds women's basketball team represented Illinois State University during the 2016–17 NCAA Division I women's basketball season. The Redbirds, led by fourth year head coach Barb Smith, played their home games at Redbird Arena and were members of the Missouri Valley Conference. They finished the season 8–23, 5–13 in MVC play to finish in ninth place. They advanced to the quarterfinals of the Missouri Valley women's tournament, where they lost to Northern Iowa.

On March 13, the school fired Barb Smith. She finish at Illinois State with 4 year record of 28–93.

== Roster ==
2016–17 Illinois State Redbirds women's basketball team
Players
Coaches

Pos.	#	Name	Height	Year	Previous school	Hometown
G	0	Zakiya Beckles	5 ft 6 in (1.68 m)	Fr	Middlesex	Middlesex, NJ
G	2	Deja Turner	5 ft 11 in (1.8 m)	Fr	Plant	Tampa, FL
G	5	Brechelle Beachum	5 ft 7 in (1.7 m)	Sr	Mexia; Western Texas College	Mexia, TX
F	12	Millie Stevens	6 ft 0 in (1.83 m)	So	Sevenoaks Suns (WBBL team)	Surrey, England
G	13	Katrina Beck	5 ft 9 in (1.75 m)	So	Whitney Young	Chicago, IL
G	15	Frannie Corrigan	5 ft 11 in (1.8 m)	Fr	Lyons Township	LaGrange, IL
G	23	Viria Livingston	5 ft 8 in (1.73 m)	So	Hopkins	Minnetonka, MN
F	25	Hannah Green	6 ft 0 in (1.83 m)	Jr	West Ranch; College of the Canyons	Santa Clarita, CA
G	30	Amaria Allen	5 ft 10 in (1.78 m)	Fr	Colerain	Cincinnati, OH
G	32	Taylor Stewart	5 ft 7 in (1.7 m)	Sr	Lakeville North	Lakeville, MN
G	33	Morgan VanHyfte	6 ft 0 in (1.83 m)	Fr	Annawan	Annawan, IL
F	42	Megan Talbot	6 ft 2 in (1.88 m)	Fr	Barrington	Barrington, IL

Head coach

- Barb Smith (Ohio State)

Assistant coach(es)

- Lisa Hayden (Miami (OH))
- Cathy Boswell (Illinois State)
- Brittney Marshall (Loyola Chicago)

Legend

- (C) Team captain
- (S) Suspended
- (I) Ineligible
- (W) Walk-on
- Injured
- Current redshirt

Roster

== Schedule ==
Date time, TV	Rank^{#}	Opponent^{#}	Result	Record	Site (attendance) city, state
Exhibition
11/01/2016*; 7:00 pm, ESPN3		Lindenwood	W 64–46		Redbird Arena; Normal, IL
Non-conference regular season
11/11/2016*; 5:00 pm		at No. 18 Arizona State	L 40–76	0–1	Wells Fargo Arena (1,748); Tempe, AZ
11/14/2016*; 7:00 pm		at UIC	W 59–52	1–1	UIC Pavilion (402); Chicago, IL
11/19/2016*; 1:00 pm, ESPN3		Valparaiso	W 77–52	2–1	Redbird Arena (614); Normal, IL
11/22/2016*; 7:00 pm, ESPN3		Yale	L 45–59	2–2	Redbird Arena (656); Normal, IL
11/26/2016*; 6:00 pm		at Northern Illinois	L 66–108	2–3	Convocation Center (1,308); DeKalb, IL
12/01/2016*; 7:00 pm, ESPN3		Eastern Illinois	W 60–49	3–3	Redbird Arena (509); Normal, IL
12/04/2016*; 2:00 pm, ESPN3		Wisconsin	L 46–64	3–4	Redbird Arena (1,209); Normal, IL
12/07/2016*; 7:00 pm, ESPN3		Milwaukee	L 60–68	3–5	Redbird Arena (509); Normal, IL
12/11/2016*; 1:00 pm, ESPN3		George Mason	L 46–72	3–6	Redbird Arena (718); Normal, IL
12/20/2016*; 7:00 pm		at Western Illinois	L 50–80	3–7	Western Hall (573); Macomb, IL
12/23/2016*; 1:00 pm		at SIU Edwardsville	L 80–92	3–8	Vadalabene Center (442); Macomb, IL
Missouri Valley regular season
01/01/2017; 2:00 pm, ESPN3		Bradley	W 71–63	4–8 (1–0)	Redbird Arena (784); Normal, IL
01/06/2017; 7:00 pm, ESPN3		at Loyola–Chicago	L 61–64	4–9 (1–1)	Joseph J. Gentile Arena (307); Chicago, IL
01/08/2017; 7:00 pm, ESPN3		at Indiana State	L 49–63	4–10 (1–2)	Hulman Center (1,421); Terre Haute, IN
01/13/2017; 7:00 pm, ESPN3		Northern Iowa	L 40–78	4–11 (1–3)	Redbird Arena (576); Normal, IL
01/15/2017; 2:00 pm, ESPN3		Drake	L 36–87	4–12 (1–4)	Redbird Arena (518); Normal, IL
01/20/2017; 7:00 pm, ESPN3		at Missouri State	L 60–65	4–13 (1–5)	JQH Arena (2,193); Springfield, MO
01/22/2017; 2:00 pm, ESPN3		at Wichita State	L 45–67	4–14 (1–6)	Charles Koch Arena (1,623); Wichita, KS
01/27/2017; 7:00 pm, ESPN3		Evansville	W 71–58	5–14 (2–6)	Redbird Arena (647); Normal, IL
01/29/2017; 2:00 pm, ESPN3		Southern Illinois	L 56–63	5–15 (2–7)	Redbird Arena (1,089); Normal, IL
02/03/2017; 7:00 pm, ESPN3		Indiana State	L 47–65	5–16 (2–8)	Redbird Arena (1,120); Normal, IL
02/05/2017; 1:00 pm, ESPN3		Loyola–Chicago	W 63–51	6–16 (3–8)	Redbird Arena (548); Normal, IL
02/10/2017; 7:00 pm, ESPN3		at Drake	L 49–101	6–17 (3–9)	Knapp Center (2,563); Des Moines, IA
02/12/2017; 2:00 pm, ESPN3		at Northern Iowa	L 51–82	6–18 (3–10)	McLeod Center (1,701); Cedar Falls, IA
02/17/2017; 7:00 pm, ESPN3		Wichita State	W 54–50	7–18 (4–10)	Redbird Arena (618); Normal, IL
02/19/2017; 11:30 am, ESPN3		Missouri State	L 44–77	7–19 (4–11)	Redbird Arena (537); Normal, IL
02/24/2017; 6:00 pm, ESPN3		at Southern Illinois	L 48–57	7–20 (4–12)	SIU Arena (806); Carbondale, IL
02/26/2017; 1:00 pm, ESPN3		at Evansville	L 56–60	7–21 (4–13)	Ford Center (719); Evansville, IN
03/04/2017; 2:00 pm, ESPN3		at Bradley	L 59–70	7–22 (4–14)	Renaissance Coliseum (636); Peoria, IL
Missouri Valley Women's Tournament
03/09/2017; 7:00 pm, ESPN3	(9)	vs. (8) Indiana State; First Round	W 51–45	8–22	iWireless Center; Moline, IL
03/10/2017; 6:00 pm, ESPN3	(9)	vs. (2) Northern Iowa; Quarterfinals	L 39–69	8–23	iWireless Center; Moline, IL
*Non-conference game. ^{#}Rankings from AP Poll. (#) Tournament seedings in parentheses. All times are in Central Time.

== See also ==
- 2016–17 Illinois State Redbirds men's basketball team
