= 2016–17 Northern Iowa Panthers women's basketball team =

Intercollegiate basketball season

2016–17 Northern Iowa Panthers women's basketball

NCAA Women's Tournament, first round
- Conference: Missouri Valley Conference
- Record: 24–9 (15–3 The Valley)
- Head coach: Tanya Warren (10th season)
- Assistant coaches: Brad Nelson; Adam DeJoode; KK Armstrong
- Home arena: McLeod Center

2016–17 Missouri Valley Conference women's basketball standings
	Conf.				Overall
Team	W		L	PCT	W		L	PCT
No. 20 Drake †	18	–	0	1.000	28	–	4	.875
Northern Iowa	15	–	3	.833	24	–	8	.750
Missouri State	12	–	6	.667	16	–	14	.533
Southern Illinois	10	–	8	.556	16	–	15	.516
Wichita State	9	–	9	.500	15	–	16	.484
Evansville	8	–	10	.444	14	–	17	.452
Bradley	7	–	11	.389	12	–	19	.387
Indiana State	6	–	12	.333	12	–	18	.400
Illinois State	4	–	14	.222	8	–	23	.258
Loyola–Chicago	1	–	17	.056	2	–	28	.067
† 2017 MVC tournament winner As of March 15, 2017; Rankings from AP poll

The 2016–17 Northern Iowa Panthers women's basketball team represented the University of Northern Iowa in the 2016–17 NCAA Division I women's basketball season. The Panthers, led by tenth-year head coach Tanya Warren, played their home games at McLeod Center and were members of the Missouri Valley Conference. They advanced to the championship game of the Missouri Valley Tournament, where they lost to Drake. They received an at-large bid to the NCAA women's tournament for the first time since 2011, where they lost to DePaul in the first round.

== Roster ==
2016–17 Northern Iowa Panthers women's basketball team
Players
Coaches

Pos.	#	Name	Height	Year	Previous school	Hometown
G	1	Mariah Criswell	5 ft 8 in (1.73 m)	RS Fr	Winterset	Van Meter, IA
G	2	Madison Weekley	5 ft 7 in (1.7 m)	Sr	Benton Community	Atkins, IA
G	10	Ellie Herzberg	5 ft 9 in (1.75 m)	RS So	Manson Northwest Webster	Manson, IA
G	11	Angie Davison	5 ft 9 in (1.75 m)	Sr	Maple Grove	Maple Grove, MN
F	15	Dariann Garrison-Nickerson	5 ft 10 in (1.78 m)	So	Des Moines East	West Des Moines, IA
F	20	Hannah Schonhardt	6 ft 2 in (1.88 m)	RS Sr	Holy Family Catholic	Waconia, MN
G	22	Rose Simon-Ressler	5 ft 10 in (1.78 m)	RS Fr	Western Dubuque	Epworth, IA
G	23	Kennedy Kirkpatrick	5 ft 10 in (1.78 m)	Jr	Free State; Bowling Green	Lawrence, KS
G	24	Mikaela Morgan	5 ft 10 in (1.78 m)	So	Iowa City West	Coralville, IA
F	32	Heidi Hillyard	6 ft 0 in (1.83 m)	RS Fr	Mediapolis	Burlington, IA
F	34	Taylor Hagen	6 ft 1 in (1.85 m)	So	Blooming Prairie	Blooming Prairie, MN
G	41	Abby Gerrits	5 ft 10 in (1.78 m)	Fr	Pewaukee	Pewaukee, WI
F	50	Megan Maahs	6 ft 1 in (1.85 m)	Fr	Western Dubuque	Epworth, IA

Head coach

- Tanya Warren (Creighton)

Assistant coach(es)

- Brad Nelson (Oregon)
- Adam DeJoode (Iowa State)
- KK Armstrong (Northern Iowa)

Legend

- (C) Team captain
- (S) Suspended
- (I) Ineligible
- (W) Walk-on
- Injured
- Current redshirt

Roster

== Schedule ==
Date time, TV	Rank^{#}	Opponent^{#}	Result	Record	Site (attendance) city, state
Exhibition
11/07/2016*; 7:00 pm, ESPN3		Maryville	W 77–34		McLeod Center (905); Cedar Falls, IA
Non-conference regular season
11/11/2016*; 6:00 pm		at IUPUI	W 69–62	1–0	The Jungle (293); Indianapolis, IN
11/15/2016*; 7:00 pm		at Iowa State	L 68–76	1–1	Hilton Coliseum (10,063); Ames, IA
11/20/2016*; 7:00 pm		UW–Parkside	W 72–54	2–1	McLeod Center (738); Cedar Falls, IA
11/23/2016*; 7:00 pm		at Oklahoma State	L 57–81	2–2	Gallagher-Iba Arena (2,153); Stillwater, OK
11/25/2016*; 4:00 pm		vs. Idaho; GCU Thanksgiving Classic	W 76–74	3–2	GCU Arena (205); Phoenix, AZ
11/26/2016*; 3:00 pm		vs. Denver; GCU Thanksgiving Classic	W 79–68	4–2	GCU Arena (369); Phoenix, AZ
12/01/2016*; 7:00 pm		South Dakota State	L 50–61	4–3	McLeod Center (529); Cedar Falls, IA
12/04/2016*; 2:00 pm		at Iowa	L 39–88	4–4	Carver–Hawkeye Arena (4,666); Iowa City, IA
12/10/2016*; 2:00 pm		Creighton	W 50–49	5–4	McLeod Center (1,235); Cedar Falls, IA
12/18/2016*; 2:00 pm		North Dakota	W 74–53	6–4	McLeod Center (1,094); Cedar Falls, IA
12/22/2016*; 7:00 pm		No. 24 Kansas State	W 67–59	7–4	McLeod Center (1,402); Cedar Falls, IA
Missouri Valley Conference regular season
12/30/2016; 7:00 pm		at Missouri State	W 61–54	8–4 (1–0)	JQH Arena (2,694); Springfield, MO
01/01/2017; 3:30 pm		at Wichita State	W 63–61	9–4 (2–0)	Charles Koch Arena (1,564); Wichita, KS
01/06/2017; 7:00 pm		Southern Illinois	W 79–49	10–4 (3–0)	McLeod Center (1,178); Cedar Falls, IA
01/08/2017; 11:30 am		Evansville	W 54–40	11–4 (4–0)	McLeod Center (1,059); Cedar Falls, IA
01/13/2017; 7:00 pm		at Illinois State	W 78–40	12–4 (5–0)	Redbird Arena (576); Normal, IL
01/15/2017; 2:00 pm		at Bradley	W 72–53	13–4 (6–0)	Renaissance Coliseum (649); Peoria, IL
01/20/2017; 7:00 pm		Indiana State	W 59–47	14–4 (7–0)	McLeod Center (1,179); Cedar Falls, IA
01/22/2017; 2:00 pm		Loyola–Chicago	W 68–30	15–4 (8–0)	McLeod Center (1,501); Cedar Falls, IA
01/27/2017; 7:00 pm, ESPN3		Drake	L 79–88 ^{2OT}	15–5 (8–1)	McLeod Center (4,027); Cedar Falls, IA
02/03/2017; 7:00 pm		at Evansville	W 62–36	16–5 (9–1)	Ford Center (528); Evansville, IN
02/05/2017; 2:00 pm		at Southern Illinois	L 59–64	16–6 (9–2)	SIU Arena (651); Carbondale, IL
02/10/2017; 7:00 pm		Bradley	W 70–50	17–6 (10–2)	McLeod Center (1,359); Cedar Falls, IA
02/12/2017; 2:00 pm		Illinois State	W 82–51	18–6 (11–2)	McLeod Center (1,701); Cedar Falls, IA
02/17/2017; 7:00 pm		at Loyola–Chicago	W 89–43	19–6 (12–2)	Joseph J. Gentile Arena (301); Chicago, IL
02/19/2017; 11:00 am		at Indiana State	W 61–59 ^{OT}	20–6 (13–2)	Hulman Center (1,979); Terre Haute, IN
02/24/2017; 7:00 pm		at No. 21 Drake	L 57–70	20–7 (13–3)	Knapp Center (6,456); Des Moines, IA
03/02/2017; 7:00 pm		Wichita State	W 62–37	21–7 (14–3)	McLeod Center (1,239); Cedar Falls, IA
03/04/2017; 8:00 pm		Missouri State	W 65–64	22–7 (15–3)	McLeod Center (1,301); Cedar Falls, IA
Missouri Valley Tournament
03/10/2017; 6:00 pm, ESPN3	(2)	vs. (7) Bradley; Quarterfinals	W 69–39	23–7	iWireless Center; Moline, IL
03/11/2017; 4:00 pm, ESPN3	(2)	vs. (6) Evansville; Semifinals	W 82–58	24–7	iWireless Center (2,181); Moline, IL
03/12/2017; 2:00 pm, ESPN3	(2)	vs. (1) No. 20 Drake; Championship Game	L 69–74 ^{OT}	24–8	iWireless Center (2,451); Moline, IL
NCAA Women's Tournament
03/17/2017*; 11:00 am, ESPN2	(10 O)	vs. (7 O) No. 19 DePaul; First Round	L 67–88	24–9	Humphrey Coliseum; Starkville, MS
*Non-conference game. ^{#}Rankings from AP Poll. (#) Tournament seedings in parentheses. O=Oklahoma City Region. All times are in Central Time.

== See also ==
- 2016–17 Northern Iowa Panthers men's basketball team
