= 2016–17 Loyola Ramblers women's basketball team =

Intercollegiate basketball season

2016–17 Loyola Ramblers women's basketball
- Conference: Missouri Valley Conference
- Record: 2–28 (1–17 The Valley)
- Head coach: Kate Achter (1st season)
- Assistant coaches: Maria Noucas; Michael Scruggs; Bianca Smith
- Home arena: Joseph J. Gentile Arena

2016–17 Missouri Valley Conference women's basketball standings
	Conf.				Overall
Team	W		L	PCT	W		L	PCT
No. 20 Drake †	18	–	0	1.000	28	–	4	.875
Northern Iowa	15	–	3	.833	24	–	8	.750
Missouri State	12	–	6	.667	16	–	14	.533
Southern Illinois	10	–	8	.556	16	–	15	.516
Wichita State	9	–	9	.500	15	–	16	.484
Evansville	8	–	10	.444	14	–	17	.452
Bradley	7	–	11	.389	12	–	19	.387
Indiana State	6	–	12	.333	12	–	18	.400
Illinois State	4	–	14	.222	8	–	23	.258
Loyola–Chicago	1	–	17	.056	2	–	28	.067
† 2017 MVC tournament winner As of March 15, 2017; Rankings from AP poll

The 2016–17 Loyola Ramblers women's basketball team represented Loyola University Chicago during the 2016–17 NCAA Division I women's basketball season. The Ramblers, led by first year head coach Kate Achter, played their home games at the Joseph J. Gentile Arena and were members of the Missouri Valley Conference. They finished the season 2–28, 2–16 in MVC play to finish in last place. They lost in the first round of the Missouri Valley women's tournament to Bradley.

== Roster ==
2016–17 Loyola Ramblers women's basketball team
Players
Coaches

Pos.	#	Name	Height	Year	Previous school	Hometown
G	1	Lauren Segars	5 ft 9 in (1.75 m)	Fr	Boys and Girls	Queens, NY
F	3	Kianna Mayers	6 ft 1 in (1.85 m)	Jr	Newark Tech; ASA College	Newark, NJ
G	4	Sarah Stenfaniu	5 ft 5 in (1.65 m)	Sr	Lake Zurich	Lake Zurich, IL
G	5	Tiara Wallace	5 ft 6 in (1.68 m)	Fr	Montini Catholic	Berkeley, IL
G	10	Kaitlyn Williams	5 ft 7 in (1.7 m)	Fr	Joliet Catholic	Homer Glen, IL
G/F	11	Brandi Segars	5 ft 11 in (1.8 m)	So	Mount Zion Christian Academy	Queens, NY
G/F	12	Citiana Negatu	5 ft 9 in (1.75 m)	So	Blake	Silver Spring, MD
G/F	13	Katie Salmon	6 ft 1 in (1.85 m)	Jr	Wauwatosa East	Wauwatosa, WI
G/F	22	Kiana Salmon	6 ft 1 in (1.85 m)	Fr	Prairie Central	Fairbury, IL
G	31	Miya Williams	5 ft 9 in (1.75 m)	Jr	Potter's House Christian Academy; Chattanooga State CC	Ajax, ON
G/F	33	Lee Williams	5 ft 8 in (1.73 m)	Jr	Potter's House Christian Academy; Chattanooga State CC	Ajax, ON

Head coach

- Kate Achter (Bowling Green)

Assistant coach(es)

- Maria Noucas (Bowdoin)
- Michael Scruggs (Tennessee)
- Bianca Smith (Colorado)

Legend

- (C) Team captain
- (S) Suspended
- (I) Ineligible
- (W) Walk-on
- Injured
- Current redshirt

Roster

== Schedule ==
Date time, TV	Rank^{#}	Opponent^{#}	Result	Record	Site (attendance) city, state
Exhibition
11/01/2016*; 7:00 pm		UW–Whitewater	W 70–57		Joseph J. Gentile Arena; Chicago, IL
11/06/2016*; 12:00 pm		Concordia (IL)	W 71–56		Joseph J. Gentile Arena; Chicago, IL
Non-conference regular season
11/11/2016*; 5:00 pm, ESPN3		Northern Illinois	L 70–90	0–1	Joseph J. Gentile Arena (1,801); Chicago, IL
11/17/2016*; 6:00 pm, ACCN Extra		at Pittsburgh	L 35–59	0–2	Petersen Events Center (516); Pittsburgh, PA
11/20/2016*; 2:00 pm, ESPN3		Milwaukee	L 46–73	0–3	Joseph J. Gentile Arena (221); Chicago, IL
11/24/2016*; 12:15 pm		vs. Clemson; San Juan Shootout	L 40–61	0–4	Ocean Center; Daytona Beach, FL
11/25/2016*; 2:30 pm		vs. Troy; San Juan Shootout	L 67–91	0–5	Ocean Center; Daytona Beach, FL
12/01/2016*; 11:00 am		at Central Michigan	L 57–95	0–6	McGuirk Arena (3,372); Mount Pleasant, MI
12/03/2016*; 1:00 pm, ESPN3		at Western Michigan	L 53–65	0–7	University Arena (537); Kalamazoo, MI
12/06/2016*; 10:00 am, ACCN Extra		at No. 14 Miami (FL)	L 43–81	0–8	Watsco Center (4,989); Coral Gables, FL
12/10/2016*; 12:00 pm, ESPN3		Chicago State	W 59–54	1–8	Joseph J. Gentile Arena (1,696); Chicago, IL
12/18/2016*; 2:00 pm, ESPN3		No. 17 DePaul	L 46–107	1–9	Joseph J. Gentile Arena (321); Chicago, IL
12/20/2016*; 7:00 pm, ESPN3		at Lamar	L 50–76	1–10	Montagne Center (537); Beaumont, TX
Missouri Valley regular season
12/30/2016; 6:00 pm		at Southern Illinois	L 57–73	1–11 (0–1)	SIU Arena (350); Carbondale, IL
01/01/2017; 12:00 pm		at Evansville	L 36–67	1–12 (0–2)	Ford Center (471); Evansville, IN
01/06/2017; 7:00 pm		Illinois State	W 64–61	2–12 (1–2)	Joseph J. Gentile Arena (307); Chicago, IL
01/08/2017; 1:00 pm		Bradley	L 53–60	2–13 (1–3)	Joseph J. Gentile Arena (342); Chicago, IL
01/14/2017; 7:30 pm		Indiana State	L 38–48	2–14 (1–4)	Joseph J. Gentile Arena (279); Chicago, IL
01/20/2017; 7:00 pm		at Drake	L 46–89	2–15 (1–5)	Knapp Center (2,129); Des Moines, IA
01/22/2017; 2:00 pm		at Northern Iowa	L 30–68	2–16 (1–6)	McLeod Center (1,501); Cedar Falls, IA
01/27/2017; 7:00 pm		Missouri State	L 32–60	2–17 (1–7)	Joseph J. Gentile Arena (221); Chicago, IL
01/29/2017; 1:00 pm		Wichita State	L 64–83	2–18 (1–8)	Joseph J. Gentile Arena (301); Chicago, IL
02/03/2017; 7:00 pm		at Bradley	L 45–72	2–19 (1–9)	Renaissance Coliseum (468); Peoria, IL
02/05/2017; 1:00 pm		at Illinois State	L 51–63	2–20 (1–10)	Redbird Arena (548); Normal, IL
02/12/2017; 1:00 pm		at Indiana State	L 32–53	2–21 (1–11)	Hulman Center (1,669); Terre Haute, IN
02/17/2017; 7:00 pm		Northern Iowa	L 43–89	2–22 (1–12)	Joseph J. Gentile Arena (301); Chicago, IL
02/19/2017; 1:00 pm		No. 25 Drake	L 42–86	2–23 (1–13)	Joseph J. Gentile Arena (298); Chicago, IL
02/24/2017; 7:00 pm		at Wichita State	L 43–65	2–24 (1–14)	Charles Koch Arena (1,337); Wichita, KS
02/26/2017; 2:05 pm		at Missouri State	L 52–61	2–25 (1–15)	JQH Arena (2,420); Springfield, MO
03/02/2017; 7:00 pm		Evansville	L 50–81	2–26 (1–16)	Joseph J. Gentile Arena (273); Chicago, IL
03/04/2017; 1:00 pm		Southern Illinois	L 46–71	2–27 (1–17)	Joseph J. Gentile Arena (267); Chicago, IL
Missouri Valley Women's Tournament
03/09/2017; 7:00 pm, ESPN3	(10)	vs. (7) Bradley; First Round	L 42–57	2–28	iWireless Center; Moline, IL
*Non-conference game. ^{#}Rankings from Coaches' Poll. (#) Tournament seedings in parentheses. All times are in Central Time.

== See also ==
2016–17 Loyola Ramblers men's basketball team
