= Terry D. Johnston =

American politician and businesswoman

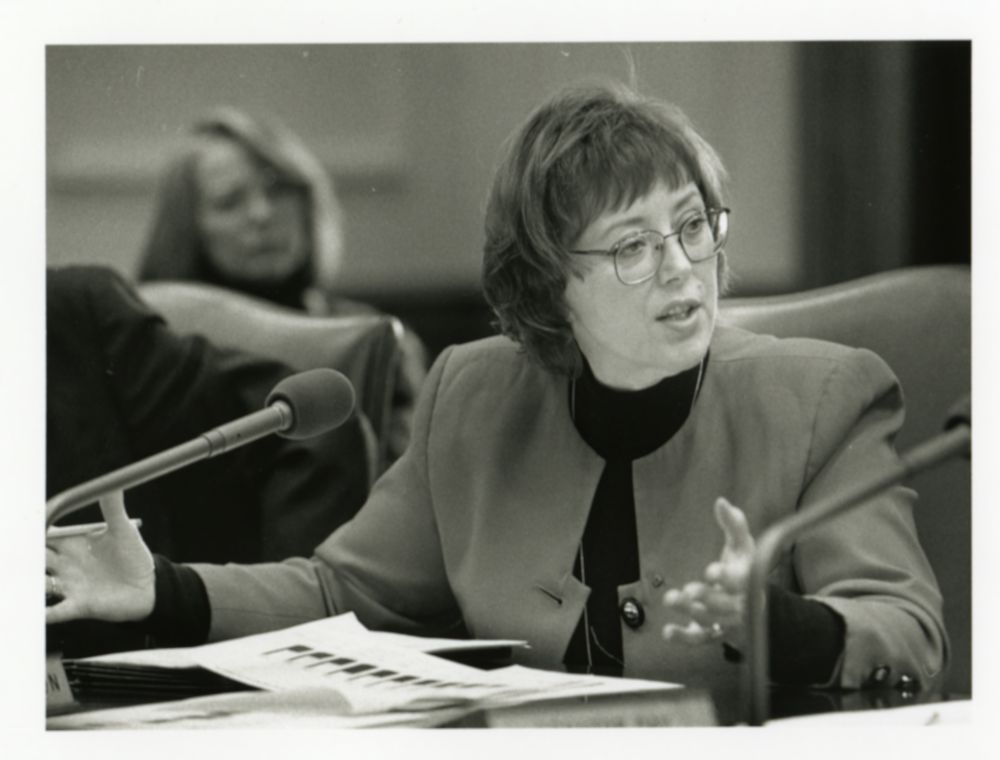
Senator Terry Johnston speaks during a committee hearing, St. Paul, Minnesota, 1991

Terry D. Johnston (born May 27, 1947) was an American politician and businesswoman.

Johnston went to the University of North Dakota and was an insurance agent. She lived in Prior Lake, Minnesota with her husband and family. Johnston served in the Minnesota Senate from 1991 to 1996 and was a Republican.
