= 2016–17 Evansville Purple Aces women's basketball team =

Intercollegiate basketball season

2016–17 Evansville Purple Aces women's basketball
- Conference: Missouri Valley Conference
- Record: 14–17 (8–10 The Valley)
- Head coach: Matt Ruffing (interim)
- Assistant coaches: Doug Rogers; Bailey Harmon; Omega Tandy
- Home arena: Ford Center

2016–17 Missouri Valley Conference women's basketball standings
	Conf.				Overall
Team	W		L	PCT	W		L	PCT
No. 20 Drake †	18	–	0	1.000	28	–	4	.875
Northern Iowa	15	–	3	.833	24	–	8	.750
Missouri State	12	–	6	.667	16	–	14	.533
Southern Illinois	10	–	8	.556	16	–	15	.516
Wichita State	9	–	9	.500	15	–	16	.484
Evansville	8	–	10	.444	14	–	17	.452
Bradley	7	–	11	.389	12	–	19	.387
Indiana State	6	–	12	.333	12	–	18	.400
Illinois State	4	–	14	.222	8	–	23	.258
Loyola–Chicago	1	–	17	.056	2	–	28	.067
† 2017 MVC tournament winner As of March 15, 2017; Rankings from AP poll

The 2016–17 Evansville Purple Aces women's basketball team represented the University of Evansville during the 2016–17 NCAA Division I women's basketball season. The Purple Aces, led by interim head coach Matt Ruffing, played their home games at the Ford Center and are members of the Missouri Valley Conference. They finished the season 14–17, 8–10 in MVC play to finish in sixth place. They advanced to the semifinals of the Missouri Valley women's tournament, where they lost to Northern Iowa.

== Previous season ==
The Aces ended last season 3–28, 1–17 in MVC play to finish in last place. They advanced to the quarterfinals of the Missouri Valley women's tournament where they lost to Drake.

On February 29, 2016, head coach Oties Epps resigned after five years. Matt Ruffing became the interim coach for the remainder of the season and for the current one.

== Roster ==
2016–17 Evansville Purple Aces women's basketball team
Players
Coaches

Pos.	#	Name	Height	Year	Previous school	Hometown
G	0	Camary Williams	5 ft 5 in (1.65 m)	Sr	Cape Coral; Hillsborough CC	Fort Myers, FL
G	1	Macie Lively	5 ft 7 in (1.7 m)	Fr	Tipton	Tipton, IN
F	2	Kerri Gasper	5 ft 11 in (1.8 m)	So	Olmstead Falls	Olmsted Township, OH
G	3	Marley Miller	5 ft 7 in (1.7 m)	So	Vincennes University	Olney, IL
G	11	Brooke Dossett	5 ft 6 in (1.68 m)	Jr	Vincennes University	Warsaw, KY
F	14	Peyton Langston	6 ft 0 in (1.83 m)	Jr	Mater Dei	Carson, CA
F	22	Sasha Robinson	6 ft 1 in (1.85 m)	Sr	Brown County	Nashville, IN
G	24	Sara Dickey	5 ft 11 in (1.8 m)	Sr	Riverton Park	Montezuma, IN
F	31	Tattenai Hall	6 ft 0 in (1.83 m)	So	Heritage	Fort Wayne, IN
F	32	Erin Sinnott	5 ft 11 in (1.8 m)	So	Oswego	Fort Wayne, IL
F	33	Ashley Hawkins	6 ft 1 in (1.85 m)	RS Sr	Vincennes University	Sacramento, CA
C	42	Kaylan Coffman	6 ft 3 in (1.91 m)	Fr	Benton Central	Templeton, IN

Head coach

Matt Ruffing (Dayton)

Assistant coach(es)

Doug Rogers (Wisconsin)
Bailey Harmon (Illinois)
Omega Tandy (Cleveland State)

Legend

- (C) Team captain
- (S) Suspended
- (I) Ineligible
- (W) Walk-on
- Injured
- Current redshirt

Roster

== Schedule ==
Date time, TV	Rank^{#}	Opponent^{#}	Result	Record	Site (attendance) city, state
Non-conference regular season
11/12/2016*; 1:00 pm		Cleveland State	L 62–66	0–1	Ford Center; Evansville, IN
11/14/2016*; 5:00 pm		Eastern Illinois	L 63–73	0–2	Ford Center (456); Evansville, IN
11/16/2016*; 6:00 pm		at Ball State	L 49–84	0–3	Worthen Arena (1,012); Muncie, IN
11/20/2016*; 1:00 pm		Southeast Missouri State	L 74–76	0–4	Ford Center (437); Evansville, IN
11/27/2016*; 2:00 pm		at Northwestern	L 66–88	0–5	Welsh-Ryan Arena (853); Evanston, IL
11/30/2016*; 6:00 pm		at Valparaiso	W 70–65	1–5	Athletics–Recreation Center (396); Valparaiso, IN
12/04/2016*; 2:00 pm		at Murray State	W 82–77	2–5	CFSB Center (233); Murray, KY
12/06/2016*; 11:00 am		Oakland City	W 108–68	3–5	Ford Center (4,581); Evansville, IN
12/10/2016*; 12:00 pm		Austin Peay	W 68–64	4–5	Ford Center (471); Evansville, IN
12/18/2016*; 1:00 pm, ACCN Extra		at No. 8 Louisville	L 47–89	4–6	KFC Yum! Center (8,320); Louisville, KY
12/21/2016*; 7:00 pm		Alabama A&M	W 63–54	5–6	Ford Center (449); Evansville, IN
Missouri Valley regular season
12/30/2016; 7:00 pm, ESPN3		Indiana State	W 57–41	6–6 (1–0)	Ford Center (623); Evansville, IN
01/01/2017; 12:00 pm, ESPN3		Loyola–Chicago	W 67–36	7–6 (2–0)	Ford Center (471); Evansville, IN
01/06/2017; 7:00 pm, ESPN3		at Drake	L 65–82	7–7 (2–1)	Knapp Center (2,106); Des Moines, IA
01/08/2017; 2:00 pm, ESPN3		at Northern Iowa	L 40–54	7–8 (2–2)	McLeod Center (1,059); Cedar Falls, IA
01/13/2017; 7:00 pm, ESPN3		Missouri State	L 41–77	7–9 (2–3)	Ford Center (605); Evansville, IN
01/15/2017; 1:00 pm, ESPN3		Wichita State	L 54–65	7–10 (2–4)	Ford Center (1,198); Evansville, IN
01/22/2017; 1:00 pm, ESPN3		Southern Illinois	W 63–60	8–10 (3–4)	Ford Center (622); Evansville, IN
01/27/2017; 7:00 pm, ESPN3		at Illinois State	L 58–71	8–11 (3–5)	Redbird Arena (647); Normal, IL
01/29/2017; 11:00 am, ESPN3		at Bradley	L 52–56	8–12 (3–6)	Renaissance Coliseum (396); Peoria, IL
02/03/2017; 7:00 pm, ESPN3		Northern Iowa	L 36–62	8–13 (3–7)	Ford Center (528); Evansville, IN
02/05/2017; 1:00 pm, ESPN3		Drake	L 48–73	8–14 (3–8)	Ford Center (588); Evansville, IN
02/10/2017; 7:00 pm, ESPN3		at Wichita State	L 68–69	8–15 (3–9)	Charles Koch Arena (1,412); Wichita, KS
02/12/2017; 7:00 pm, ESPN3		at Missouri State	L 43–68	8–16 (3–10)	JQH Arena (2,705); Springfield, MO
02/17/2017; 6:00 pm, ESPN3		at Southern Illinois	W 74–61	9–16 (4–10)	SIU Arena (705); Carbondale, IL
02/24/2017; 7:00 pm, ESPN3		Bradley	W 73–71	10–16 (5–10)	Ford Center (579); Evansville, IN
02/26/2017; 7:00 pm, ESPN3		Illinois State	W 60–56	11–16 (6–10)	Ford Center (719); Evansville, IN
03/02/2017; 7:00 pm, ESPN3		at Loyola–Chicago	W 81–50	12–16 (7–10)	Joseph J. Gentile Arena (273); Chicago, IL
03/04/2017; 1:00 pm, ESPN3		at Indiana State	W 52–44	13–16 (8–10)	Hulman Center (1,911); Terre Haute, IN
Missouri Valley Women's Tournament
03/10/2017; 8:30 pm, ESPN3	(6)	vs. (3) Missouri State; Quarterfinals	W 65–59	14–16	iWireless Center (1,404); Moline, IL
03/11/2017; 4:00 pm, ESPN3	(6)	vs. (2) Northern Iowa; Semifinals	L 58–82	14–17	iWireless Center (2,181); Moline, IL
*Non-conference game. ^{#}Rankings from AP Poll. (#) Tournament seedings in parentheses. All times are in Central Time.

== See also ==
- 2016–17 Evansville Purple Aces men's basketball team
