= 2017 Missouri Valley Conference women's basketball tournament =

- Classification: Division I
- Season: 2016–17
- Teams: 10
- Site: iWireless Center; Moline, Illinois
- Television: ESPN3

2016–17 Missouri Valley Conference women's basketball standings
	Conf.				Overall
Team	W		L	PCT	W		L	PCT
No. 20 Drake †	18	–	0	1.000	28	–	4	.875
Northern Iowa	15	–	3	.833	24	–	8	.750
Missouri State	12	–	6	.667	16	–	14	.533
Southern Illinois	10	–	8	.556	16	–	15	.516
Wichita State	9	–	9	.500	15	–	16	.484
Evansville	8	–	10	.444	14	–	17	.452
Bradley	7	–	11	.389	12	–	19	.387
Indiana State	6	–	12	.333	12	–	18	.400
Illinois State	4	–	14	.222	8	–	23	.258
Loyola–Chicago	1	–	17	.056	2	–	28	.067
† 2017 MVC tournament winner As of March 15, 2017; Rankings from AP poll

The 2017 Missouri Valley Conference women's basketball tournament (also known as the Hoops in the Heartland Tournament) is part of the 2016–17 NCAA Division I women's basketball season and will be played in Moline, Illinois March 9–12, 2017, at the iWireless Center. The tournament's winner will receive the Missouri Valley Conference's automatic bid to the 2017 NCAA tournament.

== Tie-breaking procedures ==
- 1. Winner of head-to-head competition
- 2. If three or more teams are tied, regular-season competition among the tied teams shall be pooled into a “mini round-robin.” Teams shall be ranked according to their position in such a round-robin.
- 3. Power rating using MVC games:

Team place	Road Win	Home Win
1st	20 pts.	19 pts.
2nd	18 pts.	17 pts.
3rd	16 pts.	15 pts.
4th	14 pts.	13 pts.
5th	12 pts.	11 pts.
6th	10 pts.	19 pts.
7th	8 pts.	7 pts.
8th	6pts.	5 pts.
9th	4 pts.	3 pts.
10th	2 pts.	1 pts.

- 4. The most recently available NCAA RPI ranking.

== Seeds ==
2017 Missouri Valley Conference women's basketball tournament seeds and results
Seed	School	Conf.	Over.	Tiebreaker
1	‡ Drake	18–0	25–4	
2	# Northern Iowa	15–3	22–7	
3	# Missouri State	12–6	16–13	
4	# Southern Illinois	10–8	16–13	
5	# Wichita State	9–9	14–15	
6	# Evansville	8–10	13–16	
7	Bradley	7–11	11–18	
8	Indiana State	6–12	12–17	
9	Illinois State	4–14	7–22	
10	Loyola–Chicago	1–17	2–27	
‡ – Missouri Valley Conference regular season champions, and tournament No. 1 seed. # - Received a single-bye in the conference tournament. Overall records include all games played in the Missouri Valley Conference tournament.

== Schedule ==
Session	Game	Time*	Matchup^{#}	Television	Attendance
First round – Thursday, March 9
1	1	4:00 pm	#9 Illinois State vs #8 Indiana State	ESPN3	
1	2	7:00 pm	#7 Bradley vs #10 Loyola–Chicago	ESPN3	
Quarterfinals – Friday, March 10
2	3	12:00 pm	#1 Drake vs #9 Illinois State	ESPN3	1,360
2	4	2:30 pm	#5 Wichita State vs #4 Southern Illinois	ESPN3	1,360
3	5	6:00 pm	#2 Northern Iowa vs #7 Bradley	ESPN3	1,404
3	6	8:30 pm	#3 Missouri State vs #6 Evansville	ESPN3	1,404
Semifinals – Saturday, March 11
4	7	1:30 pm	#1 Drake vs #5 Wichita State	ESPN3	2,181
4	8	4:00 pm	#2 Northern Iowa vs #6 Evansville	ESPN3	2,181
Final – Sunday, March 12
5	9	2:00 pm	#1 Drake vs #2 Northern Iowa	ESPN3	
*Game Times in CT. #-Rankings denote tournament seed

== Tournament bracket ==
First round Thursday, March 9 ESPN3
8	Indiana State	44
9	Illinois State	51
7	Bradley	59
10	Loyola–Chicago	43

Quarterfinals; Friday, March 10; ESPN3
1	Drake	64
9	Illinois State	40
4	Southern Illinois	60
5	Wichita State	73
2	Northern Iowa	69
7	Bradley	39
3	Missouri State	59
6	Evansville	65

Semifinals; Saturday, March 11; ESPN3
1	Drake	86
5	Wichita State	68
2	Northern Iowa	82
6	Evansville	58

Championship; Sunday, March 12; ESPN3
1	Drake	74
2	Northern Iowa	69

== See also ==
- 2017 Missouri Valley Conference men's basketball tournament
