= 2016–17 Indiana State Sycamores women's basketball team =

Intercollegiate basketball season

2016–17 Indiana State Sycamores women's basketball
- Conference: Missouri Valley Conference
- Record: 12–18 (6–12 The Valley)
- Head coach: Joey Wells (7th season)
- Assistant coaches: Janet Eaton; Josh Keister; Jenna Smith
- Home arena: Hulman Center

2016–17 Missouri Valley Conference women's basketball standings
	Conf.				Overall
Team	W		L	PCT	W		L	PCT
No. 20 Drake †	18	–	0	1.000	28	–	4	.875
Northern Iowa	15	–	3	.833	24	–	8	.750
Missouri State	12	–	6	.667	16	–	14	.533
Southern Illinois	10	–	8	.556	16	–	15	.516
Wichita State	9	–	9	.500	15	–	16	.484
Evansville	8	–	10	.444	14	–	17	.452
Bradley	7	–	11	.389	12	–	19	.387
Indiana State	6	–	12	.333	12	–	18	.400
Illinois State	4	–	14	.222	8	–	23	.258
Loyola–Chicago	1	–	17	.056	2	–	28	.067
† 2017 MVC tournament winner As of March 15, 2017; Rankings from AP poll

The 2016–17 Indiana State Sycamores women's basketball team represented Indiana State University during the 2016–17 NCAA Division I women's basketball season. The Sycamores, led by seventh year head coach Joey Wells, played their home games at the Hulman Center and were members of the Missouri Valley Conference. They finished the season 12–18, 6–12 in MVC play to finish in eighth place. They lost in the first round of the Missouri Valley women's tournament to Illinois State.

== Roster ==
2016–17 Indiana State Sycamores women's basketball team
Players
Coaches

Pos.	#	Name	Height	Year	Previous school	Hometown
F	1	Ashley Taia	6 ft 0 in (1.83 m)	RS Jr	St. John Paul; Odessa College	Brisbane, Australia
G	2	Freja Christensen	5 ft 10 in (1.78 m)	Jr	Falkonergardens Gymnasium	Copenhagen, Denmark
G	3	Ashli O'Neal	5 ft 5 in (1.65 m)	Fr	Wyoming	Wyoming, OH
G	4	Maryam Wilcher	6 ft 0 in (1.83 m)	Fr	Morton West	Berwyn, IL
F	5	Gabi Baldridge	6 ft 3 in (1.91 m)	Fr	Willard	Willard, OH
G	11	Diamonisha Sophus	5 ft 5 in (1.65 m)	RS Sr	Texas Southern	Houston, TX
G	14	Tierra Webb	5 ft 7 in (1.7 m)	So	Rich South	Richton Park, IL
G	20	McKenzy Telfair (redshirt)	5 ft 11 in (1.8 m)	Fr	Cardinal Ritter	Indianapolis, IN
G	21	Brooklyn Artis	5 ft 8 in (1.73 m)	RS Jr	Caprock; Seward County CC	Amarillo, TX
F	23	Wendi Bibbins	6 ft 2 in (1.88 m)	Jr	Helen Cox; Jones County JC	Harvey, LA
F	30	Regan Wentland	6 ft 1 in (1.85 m)	So	Center Grove	Greenwood, IN
F	45	Rhagen Smith	6 ft 2 in (1.88 m)	Sr	Sullivan	Sullivan, IN

Head coach

- Joey Wells (Fresno Pacific)

Assistant coach(es)

- Janet Eaton (Dillard)
- Josh Keister (Mount Mercy)
- Jenna Smith (Illinois)

Legend

- (C) Team captain
- (S) Suspended
- (I) Ineligible
- (W) Walk-on
- Injured
- Current redshirt

Roster

== Schedule ==
Date time, TV	Rank^{#}	Opponent^{#}	Result	Record	Site (attendance) city, state
Exhibition
11/04/2016*; 7:00 pm		Quincy (IL)	W 69–55		Hulman Center (1,378); Terre Haute, IN
Non-conference regular season
11/11/2016*; 7:00 pm, ESPN3		Northern Kentucky	W 58–38	1–0	Hulman Center (1,381); Terre Haute, IN
11/14/2016*; 7:00 pm		at Florida Atlantic	L 67–70	1–1	FAU Arena (535); Boca Raton, FL
11/19/2016*; 6:00 pm		at Cincinnati	W 63–55	2–1	Fifth Third Arena (734); Cincinnati, OH
11/22/2016*; 8:00 pm		at Missouri	L 48–77	2–2	Mizzou Arena (2,129); Springfield, MO
11/25/2016*; 3:00 pm		at Nebraska–Omaha	L 45–72	2–3	Baxter Arena (208); Omaha, NE
11/28/2016*; 7:00 pm		at Eastern Illinois	W 88–61	3–3	Lantz Arena (262); Charleston, IL
11/30/2016*; 5:30 pm, ESPN3		IUPUI	L 35–45	3–4	Hulman Center (1,632); Terre Haute, IN
12/03/2016*; 2:00 pm		at Miami (OH)	W 62–54	4–4	Millett Hall (287); Oxford, OH
12/06/2016*; 8:00 pm		at Saint Louis	W 70–67	5–4	Chaifetz Arena (314); St. Louis, MO
12/11/2016*; 2:00 pm		at Butler	L 48–66	5–5	Hinkle Fieldhouse (466); Indianapolis, IN
12/21/2016*; 12:00 pm, ESPN3		Tulsa	W 72–68	6–5	Hulman Center (1,367); Terre Haute, IN
Missouri Valley Conference regular season
12/30/2016; 8:00 pm, ESPN3		at Evansville	L 41–57	6–6 (0–1)	Ford Center (623); Evansville, IN
01/01/2017; 2:00 pm, ESPN3		at Southern Illinois	W 68–53	7–6 (1–1)	SIU Arena (521); Carbondale, IL
01/06/2017; 7:00 pm, ESPN3		Bradley	W 58–51 ^{OT}	8–6 (2–1)	Hulman Center (1,530); Terre Haute, IN
01/08/2017; 2:00 pm, ESPN3		Illinois State	W 63–49	9–6 (3–1)	Hulman Center (1,421); Terre Haute, IN
01/14/2017; 8:30 pm, ESPN3		at Loyola–Chicago	W 48–38	10–6 (4–1)	Joseph J. Gentile Arena (279); Chicago, IL
01/20/2017; 8:00 pm, ESPN3		at Northern Iowa	L 47–59	10–7 (4–2)	McLeod Center (1,179); Cedar Falls, IA
01/22/2017; 3:00 pm, ESPN3		at Drake	L 62–76	10–8 (4–3)	Knapp Center (2,560); Des Moines, IA
01/27/2017; 7:00 pm, ESPN3		Wichita State	L 42–56	10–9 (4–4)	Hulman Center (1,669); Terre Haute, IN
01/29/2017; 2:00 pm, ESPN3		Missouri State	L 46–49	10–10 (4–5)	Hulman Center (1,603); Terre Haute, IN
02/03/2017; 8:00 pm, ESPN3		at Illinois State	W 65–47	11–10 (5–5)	Redbird Arena (1,120); Normal, IL
02/05/2017; 1:00 pm, ESPN3		at Bradley	L 41–54	11–11 (5–6)	Renaissance Coliseum (466); Peoria, IL
02/12/2017; 2:00 pm, ESPN3		Loyola–Chicago	W 53–32	12–11 (6–6)	Hulman Center (1,669); Terre Haute, IN
02/17/2017; 7:00 pm, ESPN3		No. 25 Drake	L 45–64	12–12 (6–7)	Hulman Center (1,777); Terre Haute, IN
02/19/2017; 12:00 pm, ESPN3		Northern Iowa	L 59–61 ^{OT}	12–13 (6–8)	Hulman Center (1,979); Terre Haute, IN
02/24/2017; 8:00 pm, ESPN3		at Missouri State	L 63–73	12–14 (6–9)	JQH Arena (3,013); Springfield, MO
02/26/2017; 3:00 pm, ESPN3		at Wichita State	L 43–67	12–15 (6–10)	Charles Koch Arena (2,244); Wichita, KS
03/02/2017; 7:00 pm, ESPN3		Southern Illinois	L 66–70	12–16 (6–11)	Hulman Center (1,830); Terre Haute, IN
03/04/2017; 2:00 pm, ESPN3		Evansville	L 44–52	12–17 (6–12)	Hulman Center (1,911); Terre Haute, IN
Missouri Valley Women's Tournament
03/09/2017; 5:00 pm, ESPN3	(8)	vs. (9) Illinois State; First Round	L 44–51	12–18	iWireless Center; Moline, IL
*Non-conference game. ^{#}Rankings from AP Poll. (#) Tournament seedings in parentheses. All times are in Eastern Time.

== See also ==
- 2016–17 Indiana State Sycamores men's basketball team
