= 2016–17 Southern Illinois Salukis women's basketball team =

Intercollegiate basketball season

2016–17 Southern Illinois Salukis women's basketball
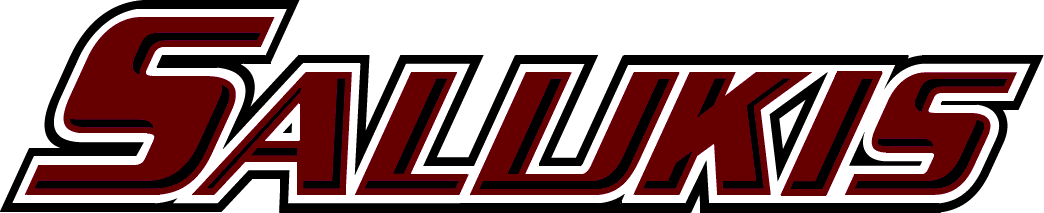

WBI, First Round
- Conference: Missouri Valley Conference
- Record: 16–15 (10–8 The Valley)
- Head coach: Cindy Stein (4th season)
- Assistant coaches: Kat Martin; Christelle N'Garsanet; Nicole Collier
- Home arena: SIU Arena

2016–17 Missouri Valley Conference women's basketball standings
	Conf.				Overall
Team	W		L	PCT	W		L	PCT
No. 20 Drake †	18	–	0	1.000	28	–	4	.875
Northern Iowa	15	–	3	.833	24	–	8	.750
Missouri State	12	–	6	.667	16	–	14	.533
Southern Illinois	10	–	8	.556	16	–	15	.516
Wichita State	9	–	9	.500	15	–	16	.484
Evansville	8	–	10	.444	14	–	17	.452
Bradley	7	–	11	.389	12	–	19	.387
Indiana State	6	–	12	.333	12	–	18	.400
Illinois State	4	–	14	.222	8	–	23	.258
Loyola–Chicago	1	–	17	.056	2	–	28	.067
† 2017 MVC tournament winner As of March 15, 2017; Rankings from AP poll

The 2016–17 Southern Illinois women's basketball team represented Southern Illinois University Carbondale during the 2016–17 NCAA Division I women's basketball season. The Salukis, led by fourth year head coach Cindy Stein. They played their home games at SIU Arena and were members of the Missouri Valley Conference. They finished the season 16–15, 10–8 in MVC play to finish in fourth place. They lost in the quarterfinals of the Missouri Valley women's tournament to Wichita State. They were invited to the Women's Basketball Invitational, where they lost to Milwaukee in the first round.

== Roster ==
2016–17 Southern Illinois Salukis women's basketball team
Players
Coaches

Pos.	#	Name	Height	Year	Previous school	Hometown
G	3	Olivia Bowling	5 ft 9 in (1.75 m)	So	Elizabethtown	New Haven, KY
G	10	Brittney Patrick	5 ft 6 in (1.68 m)	Fr	Bolingbrook	Bolingbrook, IL
G	13	Rishonda Napier	5 ft 5 in (1.65 m)	RS Sr	Bellarmine-Jefferson	Burbank, CA
G/F	15	Caitlyn Claussen	6 ft 0 in (1.83 m)	Fr	Wamego	Manhattan, KS
G/F	22	Tiajaney Hawkins	5 ft 10 in (1.78 m)	RS Fr	Central	East Chicago, IN
G	23	Kristen Nelson	5 ft 9 in (1.75 m)	Fr	Harrison	Farmington Hills, MI
F	24	Kim Nebo	6 ft 1 in (1.85 m)	Sr	Hilliard Bradley	Hilliard, OH
F/C	31	Lauren Hartman	6 ft 3 in (1.91 m)	Fr	Tremont	Tremont, IL
G	32	Kylie Giebelhausen	6 ft 1 in (1.85 m)	Jr	East Peoria	East Peoria, IL
F	34	Nicole Martin	6 ft 1 in (1.85 m)	Fr	Jefferson City	Jefferson City, MO
F/C	35	Celina VanHyfte	6 ft 0 in (1.83 m)	Jr	Annawan	Annawa, IL
G/F	40	Carlie Corrigan	5 ft 11 in (1.8 m)	Sr	Plainfield North	Planfield, IL
F/C	42	Ashley Hummel	6 ft 1 in (1.85 m)	So	Hilliard Bradley	Hilliard, OH

Head coach

- Cindy Stein (Illinois)

Assistant coach(es)

- Andrea Gorski (Bradley)
- Christelle N'Garsanet (Missouri)
- Nicole Collier (Missouri Western)

Legend

- (C) Team captain
- (S) Suspended
- (I) Ineligible
- (W) Walk-on
- Injured
- Current redshirt

Roster

== Schedule ==
Date time, TV	Rank^{#}	Opponent^{#}	Result	Record	Site (attendance) city, state
Exhibition
10/27/2016*; 6:00 pm, ESPN3		William Woods	W 78–58		SIU Arena (100); Carbondale, IL
11/04/2016*; 6:00 pm		MacMurray College	W 114–24		SIU Arena (515); Carbondale, IL
Non-conference regular season
11/13/2016*; 12:30 pm		at No. 16 Oklahoma	L 48–80	0–1	Lloyd Noble Center (3,223); Norman, OK
11/17/2016*; 6:00 pm, ESPN3		Murray State	W 70–63	1–1	SIU Arena (474); Carbondale, IL
11/20/2016*; 1:00 pm		at Purdue	W 64–61	2–1	Mackey Arena (5,679); West Lafayette, IN
11/23/2016*; 7:00 pm		at SIU Edwardsville	L 59–60	2–2	Vadalabene Center (834); Edwardsville, IL
11/26/2016*; 2:00 pm, ESPN3		Brescia (KY)	W 104–35	3–2	SIU Arena (505); Carbondale, IL
11/29/2016*; 5:30 pm		at UT Martin	L 68–76	3–3	Skyhawk Arena (1,647); Martin, TN
12/03/2016*; 1:00 pm, ESPN3		UAB	L 49–64	3–4	SIU Arena (500); Carbondale, IL
12/09/2016*; 12:00 pm, ESPN3		Southeast Missouri State	W 77–70	4–4	SIU Arena (1,432); Carbondale, IL
12/11/2016*; 2:00 pm, ESPN3		Memphis	W 69–61	5–4	SIU Arena (500); Carbondale, IL
12/19/2016*; 3:00 pm		at UMKC; Roo Holiday Classic	W 77–69	6–4	Swinney Recreation Center (220); Kansas City, MO
12/20/2016*; 1:00 pm		vs. South Dakota; Roo Holiday Classic	L 57–68	6–5	Swinney Recreation Center; Kansas City, MO
Missouri Valley regular season
12/30/2016; 6:00 pm		Loyola–Chicago	W 73–57	7–5 (1–0)	SIU Arena (350); Carbondale, IL
01/01/2017; 1:00 pm		Indiana State	L 53–68	7–6 (1–1)	SIU Arena (521); Carbondale, IL
01/06/2017; 7:00 pm		at Northern Iowa	L 49–79	7–7 (1–2)	McLeod Center (1,178); Cedar Falls, IA
01/08/2017; 6:00 pm		at Drake	L 59–75	7–8 (1–3)	Knapp Center (2,252); Des Moines, IA
01/13/2017; 6:00 pm, ESPN3		Wichita State	W 77–54	8–8 (2–3)	SIU Arena (476); Carbondale, IL
01/15/2017; 2:00 pm		Missouri State	L 60–78	8–9 (2–4)	SIU Arena (669); Carbondale, IL
01/22/2017; 1:00 pm		at Evansville	L 60–63	8–10 (2–5)	Ford Center (622); Evansville, IN
01/27/2017; 7:00 pm		at Bradley	W 66–57	9–10 (3–5)	Renaissance Coliseum (1,128); Peoria, IL
01/29/2017; 2:00 pm		at Illinois State	W 63–56	10–10 (4–5)	Redbird Arena (1,089); Normal, IL
02/03/2017; 6:00 pm		Drake	L 60–71	10–11 (4–6)	SIU Arena (706); Carbondale, IL
02/05/2017; 2:00 pm		Northern Iowa	W 64–59	11–11 (5–6)	SIU Arena (651); Carbondale, IL
02/10/2017; 7:00 pm, ESPN3		at Missouri State	L 59–73	11–12 (5–7)	JQH Arena (2,705); Springfield, MO
02/12/2017; 2:00 pm, ESPN3		at Wichita State	W 61–58	12–12 (6–7)	Charles Koch Arena (1,624); Wichita, KS
02/17/2017; 6:00 pm		Evansville	L 61–74	12–13 (6–8)	SIU Arena (705); Carbondale, IL
02/24/2017; 6:00 pm		Illinois State	W 57–48	13–13 (7–8)	Redbird Arena (806); Normal, IL
02/26/2017; 2:00 pm		Bradley	W 69–63	14–13 (8–8)	SIU Arena (803); Carbondale, IL
03/02/2017; 6:00 pm		at Indiana State	W 70–66	15–13 (9–8)	Hulman Center (1,830); Terre Haute, IN
03/04/2017; 1:00 pm		at Loyola–Chicago	W 71–46	16–13 (10–8)	Joseph J. Gentile Arena (267); Chicago, IL
Missouri Valley Women's Tournament
03/10/2017; 2:30 pm, ESPN3	(4)	vs. (5) Wichita State; Quarterfinals	L 60–73	16–14	iWireless Center (1,360); Moline, IL
WBI
03/15/2017*; 7:00 pm		at Milwaukee; First Round	L 53–81	16–15	Klotsche Center (379); Moline, IL
*Non-conference game. ^{#}Rankings from AP Poll. (#) Tournament seedings in parentheses. All times are in Central Time.

== See also ==
2016–17 Southern Illinois Salukis men's basketball team
