= 2016–17 Missouri State Lady Bears basketball team =

Intercollegiate basketball season

2016–17 Missouri State Lady Bears basketball

WNIT, First Round
- Conference: Missouri Valley Conference
- Record: 16–15 (12–4 The Valley)
- Head coach: Kellie Harper (4th season)
- Assistant coaches: Jon Harper; Jennifer Sullivan; Jackie Stiles
- Home arena: JQH Arena

2016–17 Missouri Valley Conference women's basketball standings
	Conf.				Overall
Team	W		L	PCT	W		L	PCT
No. 20 Drake †	18	–	0	1.000	28	–	4	.875
Northern Iowa	15	–	3	.833	24	–	8	.750
Missouri State	12	–	6	.667	16	–	14	.533
Southern Illinois	10	–	8	.556	16	–	15	.516
Wichita State	9	–	9	.500	15	–	16	.484
Evansville	8	–	10	.444	14	–	17	.452
Bradley	7	–	11	.389	12	–	19	.387
Indiana State	6	–	12	.333	12	–	18	.400
Illinois State	4	–	14	.222	8	–	23	.258
Loyola–Chicago	1	–	17	.056	2	–	28	.067
† 2017 MVC tournament winner As of March 15, 2017; Rankings from AP poll

The 2016–17 Missouri State Lady Bears basketball team represented Missouri State University during the 2016–17 NCAA Division I women's basketball season. The Lady Bears, led by fourth year head coach Kellie Harper, played their home games at JQH Arena and were members of the Missouri Valley Conference. They finished the season 16–15, 12–4 in MVC play to finish in third place. They lost in the semifinals of the Missouri Valley Tournament to Evansville. They received an automatic bid to the Women's National Invitation Tournament where they lost to Iowa in the first round.

== Roster ==
2016–17 Missouri State Bears women's basketball team
Players
Coaches

Pos.	#	Name	Height	Year	Previous school	Hometown
G	1	Danielle Gitzen	5 ft 10 in (1.78 m)	So	Chanhassen High	Victoria, MN
G	2	Lexi Hughes	5 ft 7 in (1.7 m)	Sr	Bishop Miege High	Kansas City, KS
G	3	Lee Ann Polowy	5 ft 7 in (1.7 m)	Jr	Blair Oaks High	Jefferson City, MO
G	5	Liza Fruendt	5 ft 9 in (1.75 m)	Jr	Batavia High	Batavia, IL
G	11	Brice Calip	5 ft 8 in (1.73 m)	Fr	Sapulpa High	Sapulpa, OK
F	13	Audrey Holt	6 ft 1 in (1.85 m)	Jr	Rock Bridge High	Columbia, MO
F	21	Aubrey Buckley	6 ft 1 in (1.85 m)	Jr	Parkview High	Springfield, MO
G	22	Alexia Willard	6 ft 2 in (1.88 m)	Fr	Stoutland High	Lebanon, MO
F	30	Shameka Ealy	6 ft 1 in (1.85 m)	Fr	Russellville High	Russellville, AR
F	34	Rachel Swartz	6 ft 3 in (1.91 m)	Sr	Stanwood High	Stanwood, WA
F	40	Onye Osemenam	6 ft 2 in (1.88 m)	Sr	Maranatha Christian Academy	Brooklyn Park, MN
C	50	Emily Gartner	6 ft 4 in (1.93 m)	Fr	Hiawatha High	Hiawatha, KS

Head coach

- Kellie Harper (Tennessee)

Assistant coach(es)

- Jon Harper (Auburn)
- Jennifer Sullivan (Memphis)
- Jackie Stiles (Missouri State)

Legend

- (C) Team captain
- (S) Suspended
- (I) Ineligible
- (W) Walk-on
- Injured
- Current redshirt

Roster

== Schedule ==
Date time, TV	Rank^{#}	Opponent^{#}	Result	Record	Site (attendance) city, state
Exhibition
11/01/2016*; 7:05 pm		Truman State	W 72–62		JQH Arena (2,022); Springfield, MO
11/06/2016*; 2:05 pm		Northeastern State	W 87–46		JQH Arena (2,012); Springfield, MO
Non-conference regular season
11/11/2016*; 7:00 pm		at Memphis	L 60–69	0–1	Elma Roane Fieldhouse (945); Memphis, TN
11/13/2016*; 2:00 pm, ESPN3		at Kansas	W 87–64	1–1	Allen Fieldhouse (2,277); Lawrence, KS
11/16/2016*; 7:00 pm		at Northwestern	L 52–75	1–2	Welsh-Ryan Arena (651); Evanston, IL
11/22/2016*; 8:30 pm		vs. USC; Great Alaska Shootout semifinals	L 67–89	1–3	Alaska Airlines Center (2,032); Anchorage, AK
11/23/2016*; 5:00 pm		at Alaska Anchorage; Great Alaska Shootout 3rd place game	W 65–58	2–3	Alaska Airlines Center (1,913); Anchorage, AK
11/28/2016*; 7:05 pm, ESPN3		Little Rock	L 47–58	2–4	JQH Arena (3,133); Springfield, MO
12/02/2016*; 7:00 pm		at Missouri	L 49–73	2–5	Mizzou Arena (2,632); Columbia, MO
12/07/2016*; 7:00 pm		at Oral Roberts	L 56–78	2–6	Mabee Center (397); Tulsa, OK
12/11/2016*; 2:05 pm		Arkansas	W 64–62	3–6	JQH Arena (3,094); Springfield, MO
12/17/2016*; 2:05 pm, ESPN3		North Texas	W 63–54	4–6	JQH Arena (2,176); Springfield, MO
12/19/2016*; 6:05 pm, ESPN3		Middle Tennessee	L 52–71	4–7	JQH Arena (2,243); Springfield, MO
Missouri Valley regular season
12/30/2016; 7:05 pm, ESPN3		Northern Iowa	L 54–61	4–8 (0–1)	JQH Arena (2,694); Springfield, MO
01/01/2017; 2:05 pm, ESPN3		Drake	L 64–90	4–9 (0–2)	JQH Arena (2,351); Springfield, MO
01/06/2017; 7:00 pm, ESPN3		Wichita State	W 73–62	5–9 (1–2)	JQH Arena (2,706); Springfield, MO
01/13/2017; 7:00 pm		at Evansville	W 77–41	6–9 (2–2)	Ford Center (605); Evansville, IN
01/15/2017; 2:00 pm		at Southern Illinois	W 78–60	7–9 (3–2)	SIU Arena (669); Carbondale, IL
01/20/2017; 7:00 pm, ESPN3		Illinois State	W 65–60	8–9 (4–2)	JQH Arena (2,193); Springfield, MO
01/22/2017; 2:05 pm, ESPN3		Bradley	L 73–75 ^{OT}	8–10 (4–3)	JQH Arena (2,468); Springfield, MO
01/27/2017; 7:00 pm		at Loyola–Chicago	W 60–32	9–10 (5–3)	Joseph J. Gentile Arena (221); Chicago, IL
01/29/2017; 1:00 pm		at Indiana State	W 49–46	10–10 (6–3)	Hulman Center (1,603); Terre Haute, IN
02/05/2017; 2:00 pm		at Wichita State	W 65–60	11–10 (7–3)	Charles Koch Arena (1,237); Wichita, KS
02/10/2017; 7:00 pm, ESPN3		Southern Illinois	W 73–59	12–10 (8–3)	JQH Arena (2,572); Springfield, MO
02/12/2017; 7:05 pm, ESPN3		Evansville	W 68–43	13–10 (9–3)	JQH Arena (2,705); Springfield, MO
02/17/2017; 7:00 pm, ESPN3		at Bradley	L 56–62	13–11 (9–4)	Renaissance Coliseum (574); Peoria, IL
02/19/2017; 11:30 am, ESPN3		at Illinois State	W 77–44	14–11 (10–4)	Redbird Arena (537); Normal, IL
02/24/2017; 7:05 pm, ESPN3		Indiana State	W 73–63	15–11 (11–4)	JQH Arena (3,013); Springfield, MO
02/26/2017; 2:05 pm, ESPN3		Loyola–Chicago	W 61–52	16–11 (12–4)	JQH Arena (2,420); Springfield, MO
03/02/2017; 7:00 pm, ESPN3		at No. 22 Drake	L 91–98	16–12 (12–5)	Knapp Center (2,448); Des Moines, IA
03/04/2017; 2:00 pm		at Northern Iowa	L 64–65	16–13 (12–6)	McLeod Center (1,301); Cedar Falls, IA
Missouri Valley Women's Tournament
03/10/2017; 8:30 pm, ESPN3	(3)	vs. (6) Evansville; Quarterfinals	L 59–65	16–14	iWireless Center (1,404); Moline, IL
WNIT
03/16/2017*; 7:00 pm		at Iowa; First Round	L 74–95	16–15	Carver–Hawkeye Arena (3,226); Iowa City, IA
*Non-conference game. ^{#}Rankings from AP Poll. (#) Tournament seedings in parentheses. All times are in Central Time.

== See also ==
2016–17 Missouri State Bears basketball team
