= Eric Pratt =

American politician

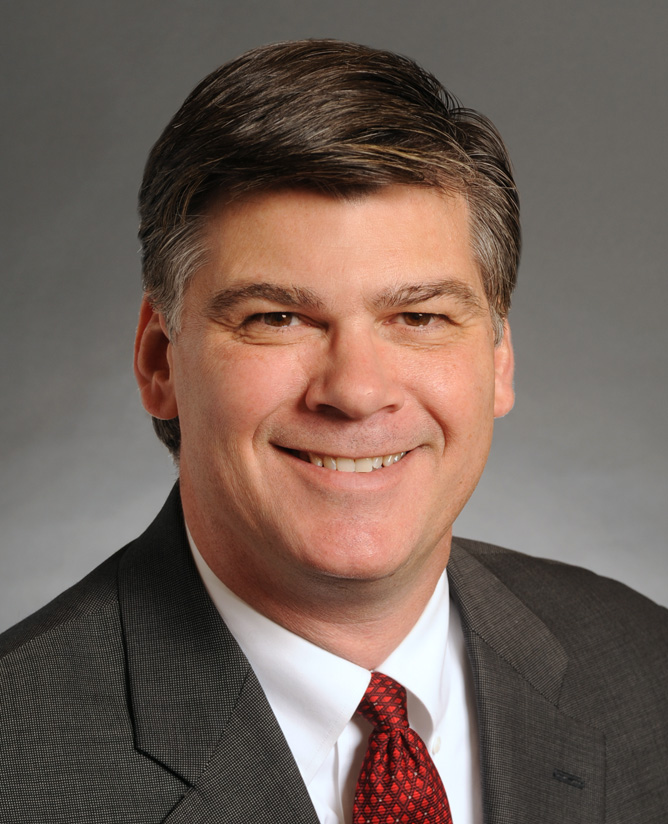

Member of the Minnesota Senate
- Incumbent
- Assumed office January 8, 2013
- Preceded by: Redistricted
- Constituency: 55th district (2013–2023); 54th district (2023–present)

Personal details
- Born: January 23, 1964 (age 62) Charles City, Iowa, U.S.
- Party: Republican
- Spouse: Tina
- Children: 2
- Education: University of Colorado, Boulder (BA); University of St. Thomas (MBA)

Eric R. Pratt (born January 23, 1964) is an American politician and member of the Minnesota Senate. A member of the Republican Party of Minnesota, he represents District 54 in the southwestern Twin Cities metropolitan area.

== Early life, education, and career ==
Pratt grew up in Prior Lake, Minnesota, and graduated from Prior Lake High School.

He attended the University of Colorado Boulder, graduating in 1987 with a B.A. in economics, and the University of St. Thomas, graduating in 1993 with an M.B.A. Pratt played outside linebacker for the University of Colorado Buffaloes under Bill McCartney. He was also a member of Sigma Phi Epsilon fraternity.

He was a member of the Prior Lake-Savage School Board from 2000 to 2012 and served as its chair.

== Minnesota Senate ==
Pratt was elected to the Minnesota Senate in 2012 with 55% of the vote over Kathy Busch. He was reelected on November 6, 2016, over Ali C. Ali with 69% of the vote. In 2020 he was reelected over DFL nominee Sahra Odowa with 62% of the vote. He was reelected in 2022 over Alicia Donahue.

In the 90th and 91st Minnesota Legislatures, Pratt was an assistant majority leader. He was also a majority whip in the 91st Minnesota Legislature.

== U.S. House campaign ==
Pratt was the Republican nominee for Minnesota's 2nd congressional district in 2026.

Austin Brown, the field director for Pratt's campaign, attracted attention after hundreds of social media posts and comments attributed to him were publicized. Brown described himself as a "White Christian Nationalist" and a Groyper, expressed support for far-right commentator Nick Fuentes, and posted racist, antisemitic, anti-Muslim, anti-LGBTQ and violent rhetoric. In one March 2026 post, Brown wrote that he hated President Donald Trump for not being more like Adolf Hitler; about two months later, Brown was on Pratt's campaign payroll.

Brown continued making aggressive social media posts into 2026, including while serving as Pratt's field director, and while Pratt followed Brown on X. Brown's X account remained publicly accessible and identified him as working for the Pratt campaign until the controversy became public. Brown was one of only two paid staffers on Pratt's campaign, according to FOX 9.

After the posts were publicized, Pratt announced that he had accepted Brown's resignation. Pratt's campaign did not answer questions from MPR News about why Brown's publicly accessible posts had not prevented him from being hired, and FOX 9 reported that the campaign did not answer questions about when it first learned of the posts or whether it conducted background checks on paid staff. At the same time, Pratt's campaign offered branded apparel featuring Pratt's name on the front and the slogan "Results Over Rhetoric" on the back.

== Personal life ==
Pratt and his wife have two children and reside in Prior Lake, Minnesota. Pratt was a financial services risk manager.
