= 2016–17 Green Bay Phoenix women's basketball team =

Intercollegiate basketball season

2016–17 Green Bay Phoenix women's basketball

Horizon Regular Season & Tournament Champions

NCAA tournament, first round
- Conference: Horizon League
- Record: 27–6 (15–3 Horizon)
- Head coach: Kevin Borseth (14th season)
- Assistant coaches: Amanda Leonhard-Perry; Sarah Bronk; Megan Vogel
- Home arena: Kress Events Center

2016–17 Horizon League women's basketball standings
	Conf.				Overall
Team	W		L	PCT	W		L	PCT
Green Bay*^{†}	15	–	3	.833	27	–	5	.844
Wright State	15	–	3	.833	24	–	8	.750
Oakland	12	–	6	.667	18	–	12	.600
Detroit	12	–	6	.667	18	–	14	.563
Milwaukee	11	–	7	.611	20	–	11	.645
Cleveland State	9	–	9	.500	14	–	16	.467
Youngstown State	5	–	13	.278	9	–	21	.300
Northern Kentucky	5	–	13	.278	9	–	22	.290
Valparaiso	4	–	14	.222	10	–	20	.333
UIC	2	–	16	.111	6	–	24	.200
† 2017 Horizon League Tournament winner * Tournament #1 seed As of March 7, 2017; Rankings from AP poll

The 2016–17 Green Bay Phoenix women's basketball team represented the University of Wisconsin-Green Bay in the 2016–17 NCAA Division I women's basketball season. The Phoenix, led by head coach Kevin Borseth, in the fifth year of his current stint and 14th year overall at Green Bay, played their home games at the Kress Events Center and are members of the Horizon League. It was the 38th season of Green Bay women's basketball.

On December 13, 2016, after starting the season 8–1, with the one blemish being a four-point loss at then top-ranked Notre Dame, the Phoenix women were voted Team of the Week by the NCAA.

== Roster ==
2016–17 Green Bay Phoenix women's basketball team
Players
Coaches

Pos.	#	Name	Height	Year	Hometown
G	1	Jen Wellnitz	5 ft 8 in (1.73 m)	RS So	South Wayne, WI
G	3	Frankie Wurtz	5 ft 8 in (1.73 m)	So	Kimberly, WI
G	4	Caitlyn Hibner	6 ft 0 in (1.83 m)	Fr	Portage, WI
G	5	Laken James	5 ft 9 in (1.75 m)	RS So	Oconto, WI
F	10	Mehryn Kraker	6 ft 0 in (1.83 m)	RS Sr	West Allis, WI
G	14	Meghan Pingel	5 ft 8 in (1.73 m)	Fr	Sun Prairie, WI
G/F	21	Jessica Lindstrom	6 ft 1 in (1.85 m)	Jr	Superior, WI
G	24	Allie LeClaire	5 ft 10 in (1.78 m)	Jr	Green Bay, WI
F	32	Karly Murphy	6 ft 1 in (1.85 m)	Fr	River Falls, WI
C	33	Lexi Weitzer	6 ft 3 in (1.91 m)	Sr	Waukesha, WI
F/C	42	Mackenzie Wolf	6 ft 4 in (1.93 m)	So	Kohler, WI
F	44	Anna Dier	6 ft 0 in (1.83 m)	Fr	Algoma, WI
F/C	52	Madison Wolf	6 ft 3 in (1.91 m)	So	Kohler, WI

Head coach

- Kevin Borseth (Lake Superior State)

Assistant coach(es)

- Amanda Leonhard-Perry (Green Bay)
- Sarah Bronk (St. Thomas (MN))
- Megan Vogel (South Dakota State)

Legend

- (C) Team captain
- (S) Suspended
- (I) Ineligible
- (W) Walk-on
- Injured
- Current redshirt

Roster
Last update: January 26, 2017

== Rankings ==
Regular season ranking movement Legend: ██ Increase in ranking. ██ Decrease in ranking. ██ Not ranked the previous week. RV=Received votes.
Poll	Pre- Season	Week 2	Week 3	Week 4	Week 5	Week 6	Week 7	Week 8	Week 9	Week 10	Week 11	Week 12	Week 13	Week 14	Week 15	Week 16	Week 17	Week 18	Week 19	Final
AP	NR	RV	RV	RV	RV	RV	RV	RV	RV	RV	24	24	21	RV	RV	RV	RV	RV	RV	N/A
Coaches	RV	NR	RV	RV	RV	RV	RV	RV	RV	RV	25	25	24	RV	NR	NR	NR	NR	NR	

== Schedule ==
Date time, TV	Rank^{#}	Opponent^{#}	Result	Record	Site (attendance) city, state
Exhibition
October 29, 2016*; Noon		UW Oshkosh	W 79–35		Kress Events Center (2,385); Green Bay, WI
November 3, 2016*; 7:00 pm		Northern Michigan	W 76–34		Kress Events Center (2,161); Green Bay, WI
Non-conference regular season
November 11, 2016*; 7:00 pm, ESPN3		Elon; Preseason WNIT First Round	W 71–56	1–0	Kress Events Center (2,049); Green Bay, WI
November 13, 2016*; 1:00 pm, ESPN3		Little Rock; Preseason WNIT Quarterfinals	W 57–31	2–0	Kress Events Center (1,724); Green Bay, WI
November 17, 2016*; 6:00 pm		at No. 1 Notre Dame; Preseason WNIT Semifinals	L 67–71	2–1	Edmund P. Joyce Center (7,817); Notre Dame, IN
November 22, 2016*; 6:00 pm		at Belmont	W 62–53	3–1	Curb Event Center (492); Nashville, TN
November 25, 2016*; 1:00 pm		at Chattanooga	W 71–55	4–1	McKenzie Arena (1,557); Chattanooga, TN
November 30, 2016*; 7:00 pm, ESPN3		at Bradley	W 68–43	5–1	Renaissance Coliseum (592); Peoria, IL
December 3, 2016*; 7:30 pm, ESPN3		Drake	W 72–58	6–1	Kress Events Center (2,299); Green Bay, WI
December 6, 2016*; 7:30 pm, ESPN3		at Marquette	W 73–68	7–1	Al McGuire Center (903); Milwaukee, WI
December 9, 2016*; 7:00 pm		at South Dakota State	W 67–43	8–1	Frost Arena (1,898); Brookings, SD
December 15, 2016*; 6:00 pm, ESPN3		Wisconsin	L 53–54	8–2	Kress Events Center (3,443); Green Bay, WI
December 20, 2016*; 6:00 pm, ESPN3		Butler	W 61–34	9–2	Kress Events Center (1,967); Green Bay, WI
Horizon League regular season
December 29, 2016; 7:00 pm, ESPN3		Northern Kentucky	W 70–39	10–2 (1–0)	Kress Events Center (2,406); Green Bay, WI
December 31, 2016; 1:00 pm, ESPN3		Wright State	W 62–41	11–2 (2–0)	Kress Events Center (2,533); Green Bay, WI
January 5, 2017; 7:00 pm, ESPN3		at Valparaiso	W 75–36	12–2 (3–0)	Athletics–Recreation Center (453); Valparaiso, IN
January 7, 2017; 3:00 pm, ESPN3		at UIC	W 79–65	13–2 (4–0)	UIC Pavilion (312); Chicago, IL
January 11, 2017; 7:00 pm, ESPN3		Detroit	W 60–55	14–2 (5–0)	Kress Events Center (1,906); Green Bay, WI
January 13, 2017; 7:00 pm, ESPN3		Oakland	W 89–47	15–2 (6–0)	Kress Events Center (2,401); Green Bay, WI
January 17, 2017; 7:00 pm, ESPN3		Valparaiso	W 56–35	16–2 (7–0)	Kress Events Center (1,901); Green Bay, WI
January 21, 2017; 1:00 pm, ESPN3		Milwaukee	W 89–47	17–2 (8–0)	Kress Events Center (3,367); Green Bay, WI
January 26, 2017; 6:00 pm, ESPN3	No. 24	at Youngstown State	W 84–51	18–2 (9–0)	Beeghly Center (1,253); Youngstown, OH
January 28, 2017; Noon, ESPN3	No. 24	at Cleveland State	W 65–51	19–2 (10–0)	Wolstein Center (134); Cleveland, OH
February 2, 2017; 6:00 pm, ESPN3	No. 21	at Oakland	L 71–74	19–3 (10–1)	Athletics Center O'rena (959); Rochester, MI
February 4, 2017; Noon, ESPN3	No. 21	at Detroit	L 72-76	19–4 (10–2)	Calihan Hall (1,251); Detroit, MI
February 9, 2017; 7:00 pm, ESPN3		Cleveland State	W 79–60	20–4 (11–2)	Kress Events Center (2,374); Green Bay, WI
February 11, 2017; 1:00 pm, ESPN3		Youngstown State	W 75–41	21–4 (12–2)	Kress Events Center (3,376); Green Bay, WI
February 17, 2017; 7:00 pm, ESPN3		at Milwaukee	L 60–72	21–5 (12–3)	Klotsche Center (1,372); Milwaukee, WI
February 20, 2017; 7:00 pm, ESPN3		UIC	W 65–31	22–5 (13–3)	Kress Events Center (2,452); Green Bay, WI
February 24, 2017; 4:00 pm, ESPN3		at Wright State	W 58–51	23–5 (14–3)	Nutter Center (694); Dayton, OH
February 26, 2017; 2:30 pm, ESPN3		at Northern Kentucky	W 74–37	24–5 (15–3)	BB&T Arena (2,569); Highland Heights, KY
Horizon League Women's Tournament
March 4, 2017; 10:30 am, ESPN3	(1)	vs. (9) Valparaiso; Quarterfinals	W 89–60	25–5	Joe Louis Arena; Detroit, MI
March 6, 2017; 1:00 pm, ESPN3	(1)	vs. (5) Milwaukee; Semifinals	W 66–59	26–5	Joe Louis Arena; Detroit, MI
March 7, 2017; 11:00 am, ESPNU	(1)	vs. (3) Detroit; Championship	W 64-52	27-5	Joe Louis Arena; Detroit, MI
NCAA Women's Tournament
March 17, 2017; 4:00 pm, ESPN2	(8 L)	vs. (9) Purdue; First Round	L 62–74	27–6	Edmund P. Joyce Center; Notre Dame, IN
*Non-conference game. ^{#}Rankings from AP Poll. (#) Tournament seedings in parentheses. L=Lexington Region. All times are in Central Time.
