= Richard J. Menke =

American lawyer and politician (1935–2006)

Richard Joseph Menke (October 6, 1935 – May 13, 2006) was an American lawyer and politician.

Menke was born in Jordan, Scott County, Minnesota and graduated from Jordan High School. He served in the United States Air Force. Menke graduated from University of Minnesota and from University of Minnesota Law School. He was admitted to the Minnesota bar. He lived in Prior Lake, Minnesota with his wife and family and practiced law.

Menke served in the Minnesota House of Representatives from 1971 to 1974 and was a Democrat. He served as a Scott County Judge and as a Minnesota District Court Judge from 1974 until 1997. Menke died from injuries from a fall near Mount Laguna, California while hiking on the Pacific Crest Trail.
