= 2016–17 Bradley Braves women's basketball team =

Intercollegiate basketball season

2016–17 Bradley Braves women's basketball
- Conference: Missouri Valley Conference
- Record: 12–19 (7–11 The Valley)
- Head coach: Andrea Gorski (1st season)
- Assistant coaches: Paul Fessler; Christena Hamilton; Kristi Zeller
- Home arena: Renaissance Coliseum

2016–17 Missouri Valley Conference women's basketball standings
	Conf.				Overall
Team	W		L	PCT	W		L	PCT
No. 20 Drake †	18	–	0	1.000	28	–	4	.875
Northern Iowa	15	–	3	.833	24	–	8	.750
Missouri State	12	–	6	.667	16	–	14	.533
Southern Illinois	10	–	8	.556	16	–	15	.516
Wichita State	9	–	9	.500	15	–	16	.484
Evansville	8	–	10	.444	14	–	17	.452
Bradley	7	–	11	.389	12	–	19	.387
Indiana State	6	–	12	.333	12	–	18	.400
Illinois State	4	–	14	.222	8	–	23	.258
Loyola–Chicago	1	–	17	.056	2	–	28	.067
† 2017 MVC tournament winner As of March 15, 2017; Rankings from AP poll

The 2016–17 Bradley Braves women's basketball team represented Bradley University during the 2016–17 NCAA Division I women's basketball season. The Braves, led by first year head coach Andrea Gorski, were members of the Missouri Valley Conference and played their home games at Renaissance Coliseum. They finished the season 12–19, 7–11 in MVC play to finish in sixth place. They advanced to the quarterfinals of the Missouri Valley women's tournament, where they lost to Northern Iowa.

== Roster ==
2016–17 Bradley Braves women's basketball team
Players
Coaches

Pos.	#	Name	Height	Year	Previous school	Hometown
F	00	Danielle Brewer	5 ft 10 in (1.78 m)	Jr	Home schooled	Coatsville, IN
F	3	Briana Gray	5 ft 10 in (1.78 m)	RS Jr	Nicolet; Saint Louis	Milwaukee, WI
G	4	Alona Johnson	5 ft 5 in (1.65 m)	Fr	Riverside	Milwaukee, WI
F	5	Chelsea Brackmann	6 ft 1 in (1.85 m)	Fr	Eisenhower	New Berlin, WI
G	12	Kellee Clay	5 ft 6 in (1.68 m)	So	Metea Valley	Naperville, IL
G	14	Ryan Wilkins	5 ft 5 in (1.65 m)	Fr	St. Teresa's Academy	Kansas City, MO
G	15	Emily Eshoo	5 ft 9 in (1.75 m)	So	Benet Academy	Naperville, IL
G	20	Shareece Burrell	5 ft 8 in (1.73 m)	Jr	East	Des Moines, IA
G	23	Leti Lerma	5 ft 10 in (1.78 m)	Sr	Muscatine	Muscatine, IA
G	25	Amber Bozeman	5 ft 9 in (1.75 m)	Fr	Dunlap	Dunlap, IL
G	32	Madison Dellamuth	5 ft 6 in (1.68 m)	Jr	Prairie	Cedar Rapids, IA
G	33	Anneke Schlueter	6 ft 0 in (1.83 m)	Jr	Max-Weber-Schule	Ulm, Germany
F	44	Vanessa Markert	6 ft 2 in (1.88 m)	So	Brown County	Mount Sterling, IL

Head coach

- Andrea Gorski (Bradley)

Assistant coach(es)

- Paul Fessler (Northern Iowa)
- Christena Hamilton (Temple)
- Kristi Zeller (Toledo)

Legend

- (C) Team captain
- (S) Suspended
- (I) Ineligible
- (W) Walk-on
- Injured
- Current redshirt

Roster

== Schedule ==
Date time, TV	Rank^{#}	Opponent^{#}	Result	Record	Site (attendance) city, state
Exhibition
11/05/2016*; 12:00 pm		Missouri–St. Louis	W 62–45		Renaissance Coliseum (525); Peoria, IL
Non-conference regular season
11/11/2016*; 6:00 pm		at Kent State	L 52–77	0–1	MAC Center (562); Kent, OH
11/13/2016*; 12:00 pm		at Butler	L 56–58	0–2	Hinkle Fieldhouse (389); Indianapolis, IN
11/18/2016*; 11:00 am, ESPN3		Detroit	W 70–60	1–2	Renaissance Coliseum (1,619); Peoria, IL
11/20/2016*; 2:00 pm, ESPN3		Saint Louis	L 58–68	1–3	Renaissance Coliseum (607); Peoria, IL
11/27/2016*; 5:00 pm, ESPN3		Eureka (IL)	W 103–59	2–3	Renaissance Coliseum (582); Peoria, IL
11/30/2016*; 7:00 pm, ESPN3		Green Bay	L 43–68	2–4	Renaissance Coliseum (592); Peoria, IL
12/02/2016*; 7:00 pm, ESPN3		Northern Illinois	L 51–81	2–5	Renaissance Coliseum (661); Peoria, IL
12/05/2016*; 7:00 pm		at Western Illinois	L 77–91	2–6	Western Hall (676); Macomb, IL
12/17/2016*; 1:00 pm		at Western Michigan	L 64–83	2–7	University Arena (690); Kalamazoo, MI
12/19/2016*; 7:00 pm		at Valparaiso	W 67–56	3–7	Athletics–Recreation Center (318); Valparaiso, IN
12/22/2016*; 1:00 pm		at UIC	W 65–56	4–7	UIC Pavilion (641); Chicago, IL
Missouri Valley Conference regular season
01/01/2017; 2:00 pm, ESPN3		at Illinois State	L 63–71	4–8 (0–1)	Redbird Arena (784); Normal, IL
01/06/2017; 6:00 pm, ESPN3		at Indiana State	L 51–58 ^{OT}	4–9 (0–2)	Hulman Center (1,530); Terre Haute, IN
01/08/2017; 1:00 pm, ESPN3		at Loyola–Chicago	W 60–53	5–9 (1–2)	Joseph J. Gentile Arena (342); Chicago, IL
01/13/2017; 7:00 pm, ESPN3		Drake	L 60–93	5–10 (1–3)	Renaissance Coliseum (610); Peoria, IL
01/15/2017; 2:00 pm, ESPN3		Northern Iowa	L 53–72	5–11 (1–4)	Renaissance Coliseum (619); Peoria, IL
01/20/2017; 7:00 pm, ESPN3		at Wichita State	L 54–65	5–12 (1–5)	Charles Koch Arena (1,623); Wichita, KS
01/22/2017; 2:00 pm, ESPN3		at Missouri State	W 75–73 ^{OT}	6–12 (2–5)	JQH Arena (2,468); Springfield, MO
01/27/2017; 7:00 pm, ESPN3		Southern Illinois	L 57–66	6–13 (2–6)	Renaissance Coliseum (1,128); Peoria, IL
01/29/2017; 11:00 am, ESPN3		Evansville	W 56–52	7–13 (3–6)	Renaissance Coliseum (396); Peoria, IL
02/03/2017; 7:00 pm, ESPN3		Loyola–Chicago	W 72–45	8–13 (4–6)	Renaissance Coliseum (468); Peoria, IL
02/05/2017; 12:00 pm, ESPN3		Indiana State	W 54–41	9–13 (5–6)	Renaissance Coliseum (466); Peoria, IL
02/10/2017; 7:00 pm, ESPN3		at Northern Iowa	L 50–70	9–14 (5–7)	McLeod Center (1,359); Cedar Falls, IA
02/12/2017; 2:00 pm, ESPN3		at Drake	L 46–98	9–15 (5–8)	Knapp Center (3,219); Des Moines, IA
02/17/2017; 7:00 pm, ESPN3		Missouri State	W 62–56	10–15 (6–8)	Renaissance Coliseum (574); Peoria, IL
02/19/2017; 2:00 pm, ESPN3		Wichita State	L 69–76	10–16 (6–9)	Renaissance Coliseum (618); Peoria, IL
02/24/2017; 7:00 pm, ESPN3		at Evansville	L 71–73	10–17 (6–10)	Ford Center (579); Evansville, IN
02/26/2017; 2:00 pm, ESPN3		at Southern Illinois	L 63–69	10–18 (6–11)	SIU Arena (803); Carbondale, IL
03/04/2017; 2:00 pm, ESPN3		Illinois State	W 70–59	11–18 (7–11)	Renaissance Coliseum (636); Peoria, IL
Missouri Valley Women's Tournament
03/09/2017; 7:00 pm, ESPN3	(7)	vs. (10) Loyola–Chicago; First Round	W 57–42	12–18	iWireless Center; Moline, IL
03/10/2017; 6:00 pm, ESPN3	(7)	vs. (2) Northern Iowa; Quarterfinals	L 39–69	12–19	iWireless Center; Moline, IL
*Non-conference game. ^{#}Rankings from AP Poll. (#) Tournament seedings in parentheses. All times are in Central Time.

== See also ==
2015–16 Bradley Braves men's basketball team
