= 2016–17 Wichita State Shockers women's basketball team =

Intercollegiate basketball season

2016–17 Wichita State Shockers women's basketball
- Conference: Missouri Valley Conference
- Record: 15–16 (9–9 MVC)
- Head coach: Jody Adams-Birch (18 games); Linda Hargrove (interim)
- Assistant coaches: Kirk Crawford; Bridgette Gordon; Kaci Bailey
- Home arena: Charles Koch Arena (10,506)

2016–17 Missouri Valley Conference women's basketball standings
	Conf.				Overall
Team	W		L	PCT	W		L	PCT
No. 20 Drake †	18	–	0	1.000	28	–	4	.875
Northern Iowa	15	–	3	.833	24	–	8	.750
Missouri State	12	–	6	.667	16	–	14	.533
Southern Illinois	10	–	8	.556	16	–	15	.516
Wichita State	9	–	9	.500	15	–	16	.484
Evansville	8	–	10	.444	14	–	17	.452
Bradley	7	–	11	.389	12	–	19	.387
Indiana State	6	–	12	.333	12	–	18	.400
Illinois State	4	–	14	.222	8	–	23	.258
Loyola–Chicago	1	–	17	.056	2	–	28	.067
† 2017 MVC tournament winner As of March 15, 2017; Rankings from AP poll

The 2016–17 Wichita State Shockers women's basketball team represented Wichita State University in the 2016–17 NCAA Division I women's basketball season. They played their home games at Charles Koch Arena, which has a capacity of 10,506. The Shockers, led by ninth year head coach Jody Adams-Birch through January 18 and then Linda Hargrove as interim head coach for the remainder of the season, are members of the Missouri Valley Conference. They finished the season 15–16, 9–9 in MVC play to finish in fifth place. They advanced to the quarterfinals of the Missouri Valley women's tournament, where they lost to Drake.

This was the Shockers' final season as a member of the Missouri Valley Conference as the school announced on April 7, 2017 that it would be joining the American Athletic Conference effective July 1, 2017.

== Roster ==
2016–17 Wichita State Shockers women's basketball team
Players
Coaches

Pos.	#	Name	Height	Year	Hometown
G	1	Keke Thompson	5 ft 5 in (1.65 m)	Jr	Shelton State	Tuscaloosa, AL
G	2	Hannah Mortimer	5 ft 4 in (1.63 m)	Sr	Southeast Saline HS; Brown Mackie	Salina, KS
G	3	Aundra Stovall	5 ft 2 in (1.57 m)	Jr	Seguin HS	Arlington, TX
G	4	Diamond Lockhart	5 ft 5 in (1.65 m)	RS Jr	Red Oak HS	Red Oak, TX
G	5	Jeliah Preston	5 ft 7 in (1.7 m)	Jr	Klein Forest HS; Blinn JC	Houston, TX
G	10	Tamara Lee	5 ft 8 in (1.73 m)	Jr	Edmond Santa Fe HS; Butler CC/Denver	Edmond, OK
F	11	Sabrina Lozada-Cabbage	6 ft 2 in (1.88 m)	So	Santa Fe HS	Santa Fe, NM
F	12	Jyar Francis	6 ft 1 in (1.85 m)	So	Ponchatoula HS	Hammond, LA
F	13	Kayla Williams	6 ft 1 in (1.85 m)	Fr	Overton HS	Memphis, TN
G	14	Marija Pacar	6 ft 0 in (1.83 m)	Sr	New Hope Christian Academy; Tallahassee CC	Podstrana, Croatia
C	20	Brittany Martin	6 ft 3 in (1.91 m)	Sr	Bishop Ford HS; NW Florida State	Queens Village, NY
G	23	TaQuandra Mike	5 ft 9 in (1.75 m)	Sr	Groves HS; South Georgia Tech College	Savannah, GA
G	25	Jaleesa Chapel	5 ft 9 in (1.75 m)	Sr	Dekaney HS	Spring, TX
F	34	Ellie Lehne	6 ft 2 in (1.88 m)	So	Byron HS	Byron, IL
F	35	Rangie Bessard	6 ft 0 in (1.83 m)	RS So	Manvel HS	Rosharon, TX
F	40	Angiee Tompkins	6 ft 2 in (1.88 m)	Fr	Charlotte HS; South Georgia Tech	Americus, GA

Head coach

- Jody Adams (Tennessee) (18 games)
- Linda Hargrove (Southwestern (KS)) (interim)

Assistant coach(es)

- Kirk Crawford (Western Colorado)
- Bridgette Gordon (Tennessee)
- Kaci Bailey (Southern Illinois)

Legend

- (C) Team captain
- (S) Suspended
- (I) Ineligible
- (W) Walk-on
- Injured
- Current redshirt

Roster

== Schedule ==
Date time, TV	Rank^{#}	Opponent^{#}	Result	Record	Site (attendance) city, state
Exhibition
11/02/2016*; 7:05 pm		Newman	W 58–49		Charles Koch Arena (1,221); Wichita, KS
11/06/2016*; 2:05 pm		Cameron	W 67–65		Charles Koch Arena (1,071); Wichita, KS
Non-conference regular season
11/13/2016*; 2:05 pm, Cox Kansas		Creighton	W 62–54	1–0	Charles Koch Arena (2,003); Wichita, KS
11/15/2016*; 7:05 pm, ESPN3		UMKC	L 54–56	1–1	Charles Koch Arena (1,362); Wichita, KS
11/20/2016*; 5:00 pm		at Texas–Arlington	L 70–74	1–2	College Park Center (525); Arlington, TX
11/24/2016*; 12:30 pm		vs. Purdue; Cancún Challenge Mayan Division	L 49–86	1–3	Hard Rock Hotel Riviera Maya (1,610); Cancún, Mexico
11/25/2016*; 10:00 am		vs. No. 11 Stanford; Cancún Challenge Mayan Division	L 39–87	1–4	Hard Rock Hotel Riviera Maya (1,610); Cancún, Mexico
11/26/2016*; 10:00 am		vs. Northeastern; Cancún Challenge Mayan Division	W 87–73	2–4	Hard Rock Hotel Riviera Maya (1,610); Cancún, Mexico
12/02/2016*; 12:05 pm, Cox Kansas		Arkansas State	W 69–51	3–4	Charles Koch Arena (9,534); Wichita, KS
12/09/2016*; 7:00 pm		at Missouri	L 57–64	3–5	Mizzou Arena (2,068); Columbia, MO
12/16/2016*; 7:05 pm, ESPN3		Abilene Christian; Shocker Winter Classic	W 81–62	4–5	Charles Koch Arena (1,470); Wichita, KS
12/17/2016*; 2:00 pm, ESPN3		Incarnate Word; Shocker Winter Classic	W 73–63	5–5	Charles Koch Arena (1,427); Wichita, KS
12/21/2016*; 7:05 pm, ESPN3		South Dakota State	L 58–78	5–6	Charles Koch Arena (1,577); Wichita, KS
Missouri Valley Conference regular season
12/30/2016; 7:00 pm, ESPN3		Drake	L 78–83	5–7 (0–1)	Charles Koch Arena (1,670); Wichita, KS
01/01/2017; 3:30 pm, Cox Kansas		Northern Iowa	L 61–63	5–8 (0–2)	Charles Koch Arena (1,564); Wichita, KS
01/06/2017; 7:00 pm, ESPN3		at Missouri State	L 62–73	5–9 (0–3)	JQH Arena (2,706); Springfield, MO
01/13/2017; 7:00 pm, ESPN3		at Southern Illinois	L 54–77	5–10 (0–4)	SIU Arena (476); Carbondale, IL
01/15/2017; 1:00 pm, ESPN3		at Evansville	W 65–54	6–10 (1–4)	Ford Center (1,198); Evansville, IN
01/20/2017; 7:00 pm, ESPN3		Bradley	W 65–54	7–10 (2–4)	Charles Koch Arena (1,623); Wichita, KS
01/22/2017; 2:00 pm, ESPN3		Illinois State	W 67–45	8–10 (3–4)	Charles Koch Arena (1,623); Wichita, KS
01/27/2017; 2:00 pm, ESPN3		at Indiana State	W 56–42	9–10 (4–4)	Hulman Center (1,669); Terre Haute, IN
01/29/2017; 1:00 pm, ESPN3		at Loyola–Chicago	W 83–64	10–10 (5–4)	Joseph J. Gentile Arena (301); Chicago, IL
02/05/2017; 2:00 pm, ESPN3		Missouri State	L 60–65	10–11 (5–5)	Charles Koch Arena (1,237); Wichita, KS
02/10/2017; 7:00 pm, ESPN3		Evansville	W 69–68	11–11 (6–5)	Charles Koch Arena (1,412); Wichita, KS
02/12/2017; 2:00 pm, ESPN3		Southern Illinois	L 58–61	11–12 (6–6)	Charles Koch Arena (1,624); Wichita, KS
02/17/2017; 7:00 pm, ESPN3		at Illinois State	L 50–54	11–13 (6–7)	Redbird Arena (618); Normal, IL
02/19/2017; 2:00 pm, ESPN3		at Bradley	W 76–69	12–13 (7–7)	Renaissance Coliseum (792); Peoria, IL
02/24/2017; 7:00 pm, ESPN3		Loyola–Chicago	W 65–43	13–13 (8–7)	Charles Koch Arena (1,337); Wichita, KS
02/26/2017; 2:00 pm, ESPN3		Indiana State	W 67–43	14–13 (9–7)	Charles Koch Arena (2,244); Wichita, KS
03/02/2017; 7:00 pm, ESPN3		at Northern Iowa	L 37–62	14–14 (9–8)	McLeod Center (1,239); Cedar Falls, IA
03/04/2017; 2:00 pm, ESPN3		at No. 22 Drake	L 89–105	14–15 (9–9)	Knapp Center (3,271); Des Moines, IA
Missouri Valley Tournament
03/10/2017; 2:30 pm, ESPN3	(5)	vs. (4) Southern Illinois; Quarterfinals	W 73–60	15–15	iWireless Center (1,360); Moline, IL
03/11/2017; 1:30 pm, ESPN3	(5)	vs. (1) Drake; Semifinals	L 68–86	15–16	iWireless Center; Moline, IL
*Non-conference game. ^{#}Rankings from AP Poll. (#) Tournament seedings in parentheses. All times are in Central Time.

== See also ==
- 2016–17 Wichita State Shockers men's basketball team
