= Jordan High School (Jordan, Minnesota) =

Location
- Jordan, Minnesota; United States
- Coordinates: 44.6582°N 93.6397°W

Information
- Type: High School
- Opened: Approx. 1874
- School district: ISD 717
- Superintendent: Renee Case Evenson
- Principal: Jeff Vizenor
- Grades: 9-12
- Team name: Hubmen, Jaguars, Panthers

Jordan High School is a secondary school in Jordan, Minnesota. It is part of the Independent School District (ISD) 717 school district.

== History ==
The current building was built in 2003 on Sunset Drive, and cost $20.5 million. Although it isn't known exactly when the first school in Jordan was built, estimates suggest that the first building was built in 1872.

== Academics ==
As of 2018, the enrollment in Jordan High School is 572, and the graduation rate is 95%.

== Athletics ==
Jordan has three mascots. The mascot for boys sports is the Hubmen, while the mascot for girls sports is the Jaguars. Because they collaborate with the nearby Belle Plaine Tigers for wrestling and Nordic skiing, the combined mascot is the Panthers.

== Alumni ==
- Richard J. Menke, judge and state legislator
