= Thomas Fluharty =

American illustrator and art educator

- Education: Art Institute of Pittsburgh
- Known for: Art, Illustration
- Movement: Dutch/Flemish
- Spouse: Kristi
- Awards: Communication Arts illustration annual winner 2005, 2006, 2008 and 2013
- Website: thomasfluharty.com

Thomas Lively Fluharty Jr., (born 1962) is an American illustrator and art educator. Fluharty's work has appeared on covers for Der Spiegel, Time, Mad, and The Weekly Standard, in The New York Times, U.S. News & World Report, the Village Voice, and in books for children. Fluharty teaches drawing and oil painting online at Schoolism.com.

== Early life ==
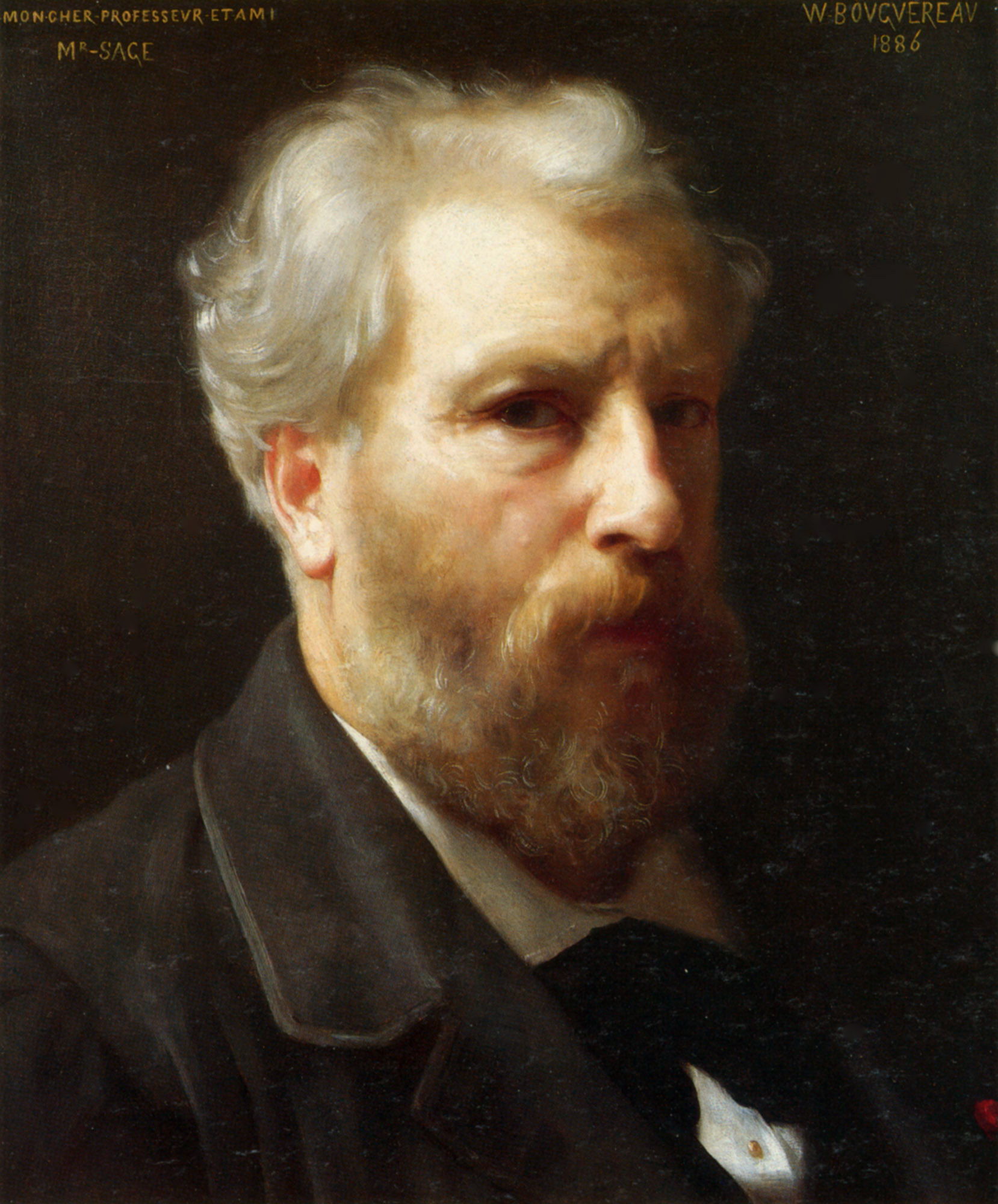
Fluharty studied the work of Bouguereau.

Fluharty was born in 1962 in Santa Ana, California. He studied art during 11th and 12th grade at the Montgomery County Joint Vocational School, in Englewood, Ohio. Then he earned an associate degree at the Art Institute of Pittsburgh. Then he moved to New York City where he trained for thirteen years with Ken Bald, who in the 1950s drew Dr. Kildare cartoons and other Marvel Comics. Fluharty learned acrylic paint at the School of Visual Arts and also attended classes at the National Academy of Fine Arts. For eight years from 2002 until about 2010, he sought classical training for his new work in oil paint. His artistic heroes are Rembrandt and William-Adolphe Bouguereau.

He married Kristi Fluharty. They have five daughters and a dog named Cash. The family lives in Prior Lake, Minnesota.

== Career highlights ==
His first major success came when Fluharty designed a cover for Mad magazine in 1996. The New York Times then commissioned five caricatures of Jerry Lewis. "That really started it all," said Fluharty.

Fluharty served as a worship leader at Sovereign Grace Church in Bloomington, Minnesota, a Christian evangelical church affiliated with Sovereign Grace Ministries.

From 2004 to 2008, Fluharty contributed five covers for Der Spiegel magazine. His work was reproduced in the book and traveling show The Art of Der Spiegel: Cover Illustrations Over Five Decades.

Fluharty illustrated three children's books published by Crossway: Fool Moon Rising (2009), cowritten with his wife, Kristi Fluharty; The Barber Who Wanted to Pray (2011) by R. C. Sproul Sr.; and The Boy and the Ocean (2013) by Max Lucado.

For The New York Times in 2013, he painted a caricature portrait of Woody Allen towering over Diane Keaton, Dianne Wiest, Scarlett Johansson and Penélope Cruz, who were "strong and memorable women" who had played leading roles in Allen's films.

Fluharty and four advertising illustrators founded Pitch House, a company that creates storyboards.

== Awards and recognition ==
Fluharty's portrait of Ken Griffey Jr. and Mark McGwire was a cover of Time magazine in 1998. The following year, Time gave the work, titled Outta Here!, to the National Portrait Gallery. He has been recognized by the Society of Illustrators in New York and in Los Angeles. Communication Arts selected his work as winner for their illustration annuals in 2005, 2006, 2008 and 2013. Fluharty won a gold medal for a portrait of Hillary Clinton from Spectrum Fantastic Art.
