= 2016–17 Kent State Golden Flashes women's basketball team =

American college basketball season

2016–17 Kent State Golden Flashes women's basketball

MAC East division champions

WNIT, First Round
- Conference: Mid-American Conference
- East Division
- Record: 19–13 (13–5 MAC)
- Head coach: Todd Starkey (1st season)
- Assistant coaches: Patrick Mashuda; Fran Recchia
- Home arena: MAC Center

2016–17 Mid-American Conference women's basketball standings
	Conf.				Overall
Team	W		L	PCT	W		L	PCT
East
Kent State	13	–	5	.722	19	–	13	.594
Ohio	12	–	6	.667	22	–	10	.688
Buffalo	10	–	8	.556	22	–	10	.688
Miami (OH)	5	–	13	.278	11	–	21	.344
Bowling Green	4	–	14	.222	8	–	23	.258
Akron	2	–	16	.111	9	–	21	.300
West
Central Michigan	15	–	3	.833	23	–	9	.719
Ball State	14	–	4	.778	21	–	11	.656
Toledo †	12	–	6	.667	25	–	9	.735
Northern Illinois	12	–	6	.667	21	–	12	.636
Western Michigan	8	–	10	.444	19	–	13	.594
Eastern Michigan	1	–	17	.056	6	–	25	.194
† 2017 MAC tournament winner As of March 17, 2017

The 2016–17 Kent State Golden Flashes women's basketball team represented Kent State University during the 2016–17 NCAA Division I women's basketball season. The Golden Flashes, led by first year head coach Todd Starkey, played their home games at the Memorial Athletic and Convocation Center, also known as the MAC Center, as members of the East Division of the Mid-American Conference. After finishing the 2015–16 season with an overall record of 6–23 and 3–15 in MAC play, the Flashes finished the 2016–17 regular season with a 19–11 overall record and 13–5 in MAC play. They won their first East division title since 2005, clinching a share on March 1 and winning it outright on March 4.

== Schedule ==
Date time, TV	Rank^{#}	Opponent^{#}	Result	Record	Site (attendance) city, state
Non-conference regular season
November 11, 2016*; 7:00 pm		Bradley	W 77–52	1–0	MAC Center (562); Kent, Ohio
November 14, 2016*; 7:00 pm		Eastern Kentucky	W 80–67	2–0	MAC Center (489); Kent, Ohio
November 19, 2016*; 2:00 pm		Robert Morris	L 65–68	2–1	MAC Center (364); Kent, Ohio
November 21, 2016*; 7:00 pm, ESPN3		at Detroit	L 52–73	2–2	Calihan Hall (607); Detroit
November 25, 2016*; 11:00 pm		vs. No. 5 Baylor; Gulf Coast Showcase	L 42–84	2–3	Germain Arena (–); Estero, Florida
November 26, 2016*; 11:00 pm		vs. Western Kentucky; Gulf Coast Showcase	L 73–79 ^{OT}	2–4	Germain Arena (–); Estero, Florida
November 27, 2016*; 11:00 pm		vs. Florida Gulf Coast; Gulf Coast Showcase	W 77–64	3–4	Germain Arena (–); Estero, Florida
November 30, 2016*; 7:00 pm		Fort Wayne	W 66–55	4–4	MAC Center (327); Kent, Ohio
December 7, 2016*; 7:00 pm, ESPN3		at Wright State	W 79–69	5–4	Nutter Center (617); Fairborn, Ohio
December 10, 2016*; 5:00 pm		Youngstown State	W 75–60	6–4	MAC Center (415); Kent, Ohio
December 20, 2016*; 5:00 pm		at Iowa	L 48–83	6–5	Carver–Hawkeye Arena (3,563); Iowa City, Iowa
December 22, 2016*; 7:00 pm		at Minnesota	L 62–92	6–6	Williams Arena (2,389); Minneapolis
MAC regular season
December 31, 2016; 1:00 pm		Central Michigan	L 78–91	6–7 (0–1)	MAC Center (–); Kent, Ohio
January 4, 2017; 7:00 pm		at Ball State	L 47–71	6–8 (0–2)	Worthen Arena (820); Muncie, Indiana
January 7, 2017; 12:00 pm, ESPN3		Eastern Michigan	W 86–67	7–8 (1–2)	MAC Center (672); Kent, Ohio
January __, 2017 pm		Northern Illinois	L 97–98	7–9 (1–3)	MAC Center (240); Kent, Ohio
January 14, 2017; 1:00 pm, ESPN3		at Ohio	W 68–65	8–9 (2–3)	Convocation Center (3,721); Athens, Ohio
January 18, 2017; 4:00 pm, ESPN3		at Western Michigan	W 71–67	9–9 (3–3)	University Arena (644); Kalamazoo, Michigan
January 21, 2017; 4:00 pm		Toledo	W 70–60	10–9 (4–3)	MAC Center (424); Kent, Ohio
January 25, 2017; 8:00 pm, ESPN3		at Northern Illinois	L 72–93	10–10 (4–4)	Convocation Center (507); DeKalb, Illinois
January 28, 2017; 3:00 pm		Bowling Green	W 80–78	11–10 (5–4)	MAC Center (486); Kent, Ohio
February 1, 2017; 7:00 pm		Miami	W 84–66	12–10 (6–4)	MAC Center (529); Kent, Ohio
February 4, 2017; 2:00 pm, ESPN3		at Buffalo	L 62–77	12–11 (6–5)	Alumni Arena (1,889); Amherst, New York
February 8, 2017; 7:00 pm		Eastern Michigan	W 83–65	13–11 (7–5)	MAC Center (527); Kent, Ohio
February 11, 2017; 2:00 pm, ESPN3		at Akron; Wagon Wheel Challenge	W 72–58	14–11 (8–5)	James A. Rhodes Arena (961); Akron, Ohio
February 18, 2017; 2:00 pm		Ohio	W 83–77	15–11 (9–5)	MAC Center (713); Kent, Ohio
February 22, 2017; 7:00 pm, ESPN3		at Bowling Green	W 70–60	16–11 (10–5)	Stroh Center (1,379); Bowling Green, Ohio
February 25, 2017; 2:00 pm, Spectrum/ESPN3		Akron; Wagon Wheel Challenge	W 73–69	17–11 (11–5)	MAC Center (1,073); Kent, Ohio
March 1, 2017; 7:00 pm, ESPN3		at Miami	W 78–51	18–11 (12–5)	Millett Hall (420); Oxford, Ohio
March 4, 2017; 2:00 pm		Buffalo	W 80–71	19–11 (13–5)	MAC Center (887); Kent, Ohio
MAC Tournament
March 8, 2017; 7:30 pm, ESPN3	(3)	vs. (6) Toledo; Quarterfinals	L 63–67	19–12	Quicken Loans Arena (3,433); Cleveland
WNIT
March 16, 2017; ESPN3		at Michigan; First round	L 60–67	19–13	Crisler Center (788); Ann Arbor, Michigan
*Non-conference game. ^{#}Rankings from AP Poll. (#) Tournament seedings in parentheses. All times are in Eastern Time. Source

== See also ==
- 2016–17 Kent State Golden Flashes men's basketball team
