= 2016–17 Ohio Bobcats women's basketball team =

Intercollegiate basketball season

2016–17 Ohio Bobcats women's basketball
- Conference: Mid-American Conference
- East Division
- Record: 22–9 (12–6 MAC)
- Head coach: Bob Boldon (4th season)
- Assistant coaches: Tavares Jackson; Mary Evans; Marwan Miller
- Home arena: Convocation Center

2016–17 Mid-American Conference women's basketball standings
	Conf.				Overall
Team	W		L	PCT	W		L	PCT
East
Kent State	13	–	5	.722	19	–	13	.594
Ohio	12	–	6	.667	22	–	10	.688
Buffalo	10	–	8	.556	22	–	10	.688
Miami (OH)	5	–	13	.278	11	–	21	.344
Bowling Green	4	–	14	.222	8	–	23	.258
Akron	2	–	16	.111	9	–	21	.300
West
Central Michigan	15	–	3	.833	23	–	9	.719
Ball State	14	–	4	.778	21	–	11	.656
Toledo †	12	–	6	.667	25	–	9	.735
Northern Illinois	12	–	6	.667	21	–	12	.636
Western Michigan	8	–	10	.444	19	–	13	.594
Eastern Michigan	1	–	17	.056	6	–	25	.194
† 2017 MAC tournament winner As of March 17, 2017

The 2016–17 Ohio Bobcats women's basketball team represented Ohio University during the 2016–17 NCAA Division I women's basketball season. The Bobcats, led by fourth-year head coach Bob Boldon, played their home games at the Convocation Center in Athens, Ohio as a member of the Mid-American Conference (MAC). They finished the season 22–9, 12–6 in MAC play, to finish in second place in the East Division.

== Preseason ==
The preseason coaches' poll and league awards were announced by the league office on October 27, 2016. Ohio was picked first in the MAC East.

=== Preseason women's basketball coaches poll ===
(First-place votes in parentheses)

==== East Division ====
1. Ohio (9) 69
2. Buffalo (3) 60
3. Akron 48
4. Bowling Green 30
5. Miami 27
6. Kent State 18

==== West Division ====
1. Central Michigan (12) 72
2. Ball State 53
3. Toledo 53
4. Western Michigan 34
5. Northern Illinois 25
6. Eastern Michigan 15

==== Regular season champion ====
Central Michigan (6), Ohio (5), Buffalo (1)

==== Tournament champs ====
Central Michigan (7), Ohio (4), Buffalo (1)

=== Preseason All-MAC ===
Preseason All-MAC teams
Team	Player	Position	Year
Preseason All-MAC East	Quiera Lampkins	G	Sr.

== Roster ==
2016–17 Ohio Bobcats women's basketball team
Players
Coaches

Pos.	#	Name	Height	Year	Hometown
G	0	Taylor Agler	5 ft 9 in (1.75 m)	RS Jr	Westerville, OH
G	2	Katie Barker	5 ft 10 in (1.78 m)	RS Fr	Cary, IL
G	3	Amani Burke	5 ft 9 in (1.75 m)	RS Fr	Columbus, OH
G	5	Quiera Lampkins	5 ft 9 in (1.75 m)	Sr	Gahanna, OH
G	7	Adyn Bucher	—	Sr	Athens, OH
G	3	Dominique Doseck	5 ft 8 in (1.73 m)	So	Athens, OH
F	11	Kelly Karlis	6 ft 2 in (1.88 m)	RS So	Medinah, IL
G	12	Yamonie Jenkins	5 ft 7 in (1.7 m)	Sr	Reynoldsburg, OH
F	13	Olivia Bower	6 ft 1 in (1.85 m)	So	Bowerston, OH
F	15	Jasmine Weatherspoon	6 ft 2 in (1.88 m)	Sr	Columbus, OH
F	20	Tmisht Stinson	5 ft 10 in (1.78 m)	Sr	Hattiesburg, MS
F	21	Hannah Thome	6 ft 1 in (1.85 m)	RS Fr	Chagrin Falls, OH
F	22	Hannah Boesinger	5 ft 11 in (1.8 m)	Sr	Chagrin Falls, OH
G	24	Meche'la Cobb	6 ft 0 in (1.83 m)	Fr	New Albany, OH
F	54	Kendall Jessing	6 ft 0 in (1.83 m)	So	Sylvania, OH

Head coach

- Bob Boldon (Walsh)

Assistant coach(es)

- Tavares Jackson (Minnesota)
- Mary Evans (Georgia Southern)
- Marwan Miller (Franklin (OH))

Legend

- (C) Team captain
- (S) Suspended
- (I) Ineligible
- (W) Walk-on
- Injured
- Current redshirt

Roster
Last update: July 9, 2024

== Schedule ==
Date time, TV	Rank^{#}	Opponent^{#}	Result	Record	Site (attendance) city, state
Exhibition
November 5, 2016*; 11:30 a.m.		Thomas More	W 87–50	0–0	Convocation Center (3,391); Athens, OH
Non-conference regular season
November 13, 2016*; 2:00 p.m., BSN		at High Point	W 76–48	1–0	Millis Center (823); High Point, NC
November 18, 2016*; 11:00 a.m., ESPN3		UT Martin	W 72–55	2–0	Convocation Center (3,241); Athens, OH
November 21, 2016*; 7:00 p.m., ESPN3		Northern Kentucky	W 58–41	3–0	Convocation Center (1,512); Athens, OH
November 26, 2016*; 2:00 p.m.		Murray State	W 79–70	4–0	Convocation Center (984); Athens, OH
November 30, 2016*; 11:00 a.m.		at Middle Tennessee State	W 73–52	5–0	Murphy Center (11,222); Murfreesboro, TN
December 3, 2016*; 1:00 p.m., ESPN3		Duquesne	W 64–46	6–0	Convocation Center (3,577); Athens, OH
December 10, 2016*; 3:00 p.m.		at IUPUI	W 71–65	7–0	Indiana Farmers Coliseum (300); Indianapolis, IN
December 13, 2016*; 6:30 p.m.		at Michigan	L 46–69	7–1	Crisler Center (1,802); Ann Arbor, MI
December 19, 2016*; 7:00 p.m.		Binghamton	W 63–55	8–1	Convocation Center (1,039); Athens, OH
December 22, 2016*; 7:00 p.m.		Illinois	W 80–68	9–1	Convocation Center (1,211); Athens, OH
December 28, 2016*; 2:00 p.m.		at North Carolina A&T	L 57–63	9–2	Corbett Sports Center (247); Greensboro, NC
MAC regular season
December 31, 2016; 12:00 p.m.		at Bowling Green	W 69–58	10–2 (1–0)	Stroh Center (1,509); Bowling Green, OH
January 4, 2017; 7:00 p.m., BCSN		Buffalo	W 83–55	11–2 (2–0)	Convocation Center (1,346); Athens, OH
January 7, 2017; 2:00 p.m.		at Northern Illinois	L 80–88	11–3 (2–1)	Convocation Center (–); DeKalb, IL
January 11, 2017; 7:00 p.m., ESPN3		at Akron	W 85–69	12–3 (3–1)	Rhodes Arena (650); Akron, OH
January 14, 2017; 1:00 p.m., ESPN3		Kent State	L 65–68	12–4 (3–2)	Convocation Center (3,721); Athens, OH
January 18, 2017; 7:00 p.m., ESPN3		at Toledo	W 64–55	13–4 (4–2)	Savage Arena (3,594); Toledo, OH
January 21, 2017; 2:00 p.m., ESPN3		Eastern Michigan	W 68–51	14–4 (5–2)	Convocation Center (1,926); Athens, OH
January 25, 2017; 7:00 p.m., ESPN3		Western Michigan	W 80–67	15–4 (6–2)	Convocation Center (1,245); Athens, OH
January 28, 2017; 1:00 p.m.		at Miami (OH)	W 79–62	16–4 (7–2)	Millett Hall (437); Oxford, OH
February 1, 2017; 6:00 p.m., ESPN3		at Central Michigan	L 59–64	15–5 (7–3)	McGuirk Arena (1,460); Mount Pleasant, MI
February 4, 2017; 1:00 p.m., ESPN3		Toledo	W 61–55	17–5 (8–3)	Convocation Center (3,356); Athens, OH
February 11, 2017; 3:30 p.m.		at Ball State	W 72–68	18–5 (9–3)	Worthen Arena (1,011); Muncie, IN
February 15, 2017; 7:00 p.m., ESPN3		Central Michigan	L 64–70	18–6 (9–4)	Convocation Center (1,314); Athens, OH
February 18, 2017; 2:00 p.m.		at Kent State	L 77–83 ^{OT}	18–7 (9–5)	MAC Center (713); Kent, OH
February 22, 2017; 7:00 p.m.		at Buffalo	L 54–65	18–8 (9–6)	Alumni Arena (1,220); Buffalo, NY
February 25, 2017; 2:00 p.m., ESPN3		Miami (OH)	W 77–63	19–8 (10–6)	Convocation Center (2,366); Athens, OH
March 1, 2017; 7:00 p.m., ESPN3		Bowling Green	W 79–68	20–8 (11–6)	Convocation Center (1,186); Athens, OH
March 4, 2017; 2:00 p.m.		Akron	W 62–48	21–8 (12–6)	Convocation Center (2,725); Athens, OH
MAC tournament
March 6, 2017; 6:00 p.m., ESPN3		Eastern Michigan; First round	W 63–49	22–8 (12–6)	Convocation Center (1,237); Athens, OH
March 8, 2017; 2:35 p.m., ESPN/BCSN		vs. Northern Illinois; Quarterfinals	L 71–72	22–9 (12–6)	Quicken Loans Arena; Cleveland, OH
*Non-conference game. ^{#}Rankings from AP poll. (#) Tournament seedings in parentheses. All times are in Eastern.

== Awards and honors ==
=== Weekly awards ===
Weekly award honors
Honors	Player	Position	Date awarded	Source
MAC East player of the week	Quiera Lampkins	G	December 6	
MAC East player of the week	Quiera Lampkins	G	December 13	
MAC East player of the week	Quiera Lampkins	G	January 3	
MAC East player of the week	Quiera Lampkins	G	January 24	

=== All-MAC Awards ===
After the season Cece Hooks won an unprecedented 4th MAC defensive player of the year.

Postseason All-MAC teams
Team	Player	Position	Year
All-MAC 2nd team	Quiera Lampkins	G	Sr.
All-MAC Freshman team	Amani Burke	G	Fr.
All-MAC Defensive team	Jasmine Weatherspoon	F	Sr.

== See also ==
- 2016–17 Ohio Bobcats men's basketball team
