= 2016–17 Bowling Green Falcons women's basketball team =

Intercollegiate basketball season

2016–17 Bowling Green Falcons women's basketball
- Conference: Mid-American Conference
- East Division
- Record: 8–23 (4–14 MAC)
- Head coach: Jennifer Roos (5th season)
- Assistant coaches: Jesse Fleming; Jacey Brooks; Sahar Nusseibeh
- Home arena: Stroh Center

2016–17 Mid-American Conference women's basketball standings
	Conf.				Overall
Team	W		L	PCT	W		L	PCT
East
Kent State	13	–	5	.722	19	–	13	.594
Ohio	12	–	6	.667	22	–	10	.688
Buffalo	10	–	8	.556	22	–	10	.688
Miami (OH)	5	–	13	.278	11	–	21	.344
Bowling Green	4	–	14	.222	8	–	23	.258
Akron	2	–	16	.111	9	–	21	.300
West
Central Michigan	15	–	3	.833	23	–	9	.719
Ball State	14	–	4	.778	21	–	11	.656
Toledo †	12	–	6	.667	25	–	9	.735
Northern Illinois	12	–	6	.667	21	–	12	.636
Western Michigan	8	–	10	.444	19	–	13	.594
Eastern Michigan	1	–	17	.056	6	–	25	.194
† 2017 MAC tournament winner As of March 17, 2017

The 2016–17 Bowling Green Falcons women's basketball team represented Bowling Green State University during the 2016–17 NCAA Division I women's basketball season. The Falcons, led by fifth year head coach Jennifer Roos, played their home games at the Stroh Center as members of the East Division of the Mid-American Conference.

== Schedule ==
Date time, TV	Rank^{#}	Opponent^{#}	Result	Record	Site (attendance) city, state
Non-conference regular season
November 11, 2016*; 5:30 pm		at Eastern Kentucky	L 55–57	0–1	Alumni Coliseum (–); Richmond, Kentucky
November 15, 2016*; 12:00 pm, ESPN3		Cincinnati	L 58–68	0–2	Stroh Center (1,085); Bowling Green, Ohio
November 19, 2016*; 4:30 pm		at No. 5 Louisville; Hall of Fame Women's Challenge	L 58–83	0–3	KFC Yum! Center (8,194); Louisville, Kentucky
November 20, 2016*; 2:00 pm		vs. Chattanooga; Hall of Fame Women's Challenge	L 49–54	0–4	KFC Yum! Center (–); Louisville, Kentucky
November 21, 2016*; 5:00 pm		vs. Lafayette; Hall of Fame Women's Challenge	W 69–42	1–4	KFC Yum! Center (–); Louisville, Kentucky
November 27, 2016*; 10:30 am		at Saint Peter's	W 73–68	2–4	Yanitelli Center (–); Springfield, Massachusetts
November 30, 2016*; 7:00 pm		Davis & Elkins	W 73–46	3–4	Stroh Center (–); Bowling Green, Ohio
December 4, 2016*; 2:00 pm		Virginia	L 47–67	3–5	Stroh Center (1,823); Bowling Green, Ohio
December 7, 2016*; 7:00 pm		Ohio Valley	W 82–46	4–5	Stroh Center (–); Bowling Green, Ohio
December 11, 2016*; 3:30 pm		at No. 25 Virginia Tech	L 51–98	4–6	Cassell Coliseum (2,449); Blacksburg, Virginia
December 18, 2016*; 1:00 PM		at South Dakota State	Cancelled		Frost Arena; Brookings, South Dakota
December 21, 2016*; 7:00 pm		Cleveland State	L 56–64	4–7	Stroh Center; Bowling Green, Ohio
December 28, 2016*; 7:00 pm		Malone	L 65–78	4–8	Stroh Center; Bowling Green, Ohio
MAC regular season
December 31, 2016; 12:00 pm, ESPN3		Ohio	L 58–69	4–9 (0-1)	Stroh Center (1,509); Bowling Green, Ohio
January 4, 2017; 7:00 pm		Northern Illinois	L 76–89	4–10 (0–2)	Stroh Center (1,216); Bowling Green, Ohio
January 7, 2017; 2:00 pm		at Akron	W 62–58	5–10 (1–2)	James A. Rhodes Arena (634); Akron, Ohio
January 11, 2017; 7:00 pm		at Western Michigan	L 58–75	5–11 (1–3)	University Arena (563); Kalamazoo, Michigan
January 14, 2017; 2:30 pm		Central Michigan	L 65–76	5–12 (1–4)	Stroh Center (2,234); Bowling Green, Ohio
January 18, 2017; 7:00 pm		Buffalo	L 50–61	5–13 (1–5)	Stroh Center (1,389); Bowling Green, Ohio
January 21, 2017; 12:00 pm		Ball State	L 53–75	5–14 (1–6)	Stroh Center (2,953); Bowling Green, Ohio
January 25, 2017; 7:00 pm, BCSN		at Eastern Michigan	L 74–81	5–15 (1–7)	Convocation Center (672); Ypsilanti, Michigan
January 28, 2017; 3:00 pm		at Kent State	L 78–80	5–16 (1–8)	MAC Center (486); Kent, Ohio
February 4, 2017; 12:30 pm, ESPN3		Akron	W 86–50	6–16 (2–8)	Stroh Center (1,406); Bowling Green, Ohio
February 8, 2017; 7:00 pm, ESPN3		at Ball State	L 70–91	6–17 (2–9)	Worthen Arena (1,153); Muncie, Indiana
February 11, 2017; 7:00 pm, ESPN3		at Toledo	L 59–74	6–18 (2–10)	Savage Arena (4,363); Toledo, Ohio
February 15, 2017; 7:00 pm, ESPN3		Western Michigan	L 53–74	6–19 (2–11)	Stroh Center (1,360); Bowling Green, Ohio
February 18, 2017; 7:00 pm, ESPN3		at Miami (OH)	W 61–59	7–19 (3–11)	Millett Hall (601); Miami of Ohio
February 22, 2017; 7:00 pm, ESPN3		Kent State	L 60–70	7–20 (3–12)	Stroh Center (1,379); Bowling Green, Ohio
February 25, 2017; 1:00 pm, ESPN3		at Buffalo	W 64–62	8–20 (4–12)	Alumni Arena (1,604); Buffalo, New York
March 1, 2017; 7:00 pm, ESPN3		at Ohio	L 68–79	8–21 (4–13)	Convocation Center (1,186); Athens, Ohio
March 4, 2017; 12:00 pm, ESPN3		Miami (OH)	L 65–75	8–22 (4–14)	Stroh Center (1,483); Bowling Green, Ohio
MAC Tournament
March 6, 2017; 5:30 pm, ESPN3		at Buffalo	L 45–61	8–23	Alumni Arena (1,221); Buffalo, New York
*Non-conference game. ^{#}Rankings from AP Poll. (#) Tournament seedings in parentheses. All times are in Eastern Time.

== See also ==
2016–17 Bowling Green Falcons men's basketball team
