= 2016–17 Akron Zips women's basketball team =

Intercollegiate basketball season

2016–17 Akron Zips women's basketball
- Conference: Mid-American Conference
- East Division
- Record: 9–21 (2–16 MAC)
- Head coach: Jodi Kest (11th season)
- Assistant coaches: Melissa Jackson; Sam Pierce; Preston Reid
- Home arena: James A. Rhodes Arena

2016–17 Mid-American Conference women's basketball standings
	Conf.				Overall
Team	W		L	PCT	W		L	PCT
East
Kent State	13	–	5	.722	19	–	13	.594
Ohio	12	–	6	.667	22	–	10	.688
Buffalo	10	–	8	.556	22	–	10	.688
Miami (OH)	5	–	13	.278	11	–	21	.344
Bowling Green	4	–	14	.222	8	–	23	.258
Akron	2	–	16	.111	9	–	21	.300
West
Central Michigan	15	–	3	.833	23	–	9	.719
Ball State	14	–	4	.778	21	–	11	.656
Toledo †	12	–	6	.667	25	–	9	.735
Northern Illinois	12	–	6	.667	21	–	12	.636
Western Michigan	8	–	10	.444	19	–	13	.594
Eastern Michigan	1	–	17	.056	6	–	25	.194
† 2017 MAC tournament winner As of March 17, 2017

The 2016–17 Akron Zips women's basketball team represented the University of Akron during the 2016–17 NCAA Division I women's basketball season. The Zips, led by 11th year head coach Jodi Kest, played their home games at the James A. Rhodes Arena as members of the East Division of the Mid-American Conference.

They finished the season 9–21 overall, 2–16 in MAC play to finish in 11th place. As the No. 11 seed in the 2017 MAC tournament, they were defeated by Toledo 37–65 in the opening round.

== Schedule ==
Date time, TV	Rank^{#}	Opponent^{#}	Result	Record	Site (attendance) city, state
Non-conference regular season
November 12, 2016*; 2:00 pm		Malone	W 63–52	1–0	James A. Rhodes Arena (569); Akron, OH
November 16, 2016*; 7:00 pm		at Penn State	L 71–84	1–1	Bryce Jordan Center (2,410); University Park, PA
November 20, 2016*; 2:00 pm		at Canisius	W 73–64	2–1	Koessler Athletic Center (774); Buffalo, NY
November 30, 2016*; 10:30 am		at Bucknell	L 47–61	2–2	James A. Rhodes Arena (1,449); Akron, OH
December 3, 2016*; 1:00 pm		at Winthrop	W 80–59	3–2	Winthrop Coliseum (281); Rock Hill, SC
December 6, 2016*; 7:00 pm		at Youngstown State	W 76–74	4–2	Beeghly Center (1,194); Youngstown, OH
December 10, 2016*; 2:00 pm		at Eastern Kentucky	W 63–57	5–2	Alumni Coliseum (220); Richmond, KY
December 17, 2016*; 5:00 pm		Duquesne	L 57–67	5–3	James A. Rhodes Arena (974); Akron, OH
December 20, 2016*; 1:00 pm		at Georgia State; Georgia State Classic	W 78–66	6–3	GSU Sports Arena (333); Atlanta, GA
December 21, 2016*; 1:00 pm		vs. Elon; Georgia State Classic	L 62–65	6–4	GSU Sports Arena (365); Atlanta, GA
December 28, 2016*; 7:00 pm		Ohio Christian University	W 69–52	7–4	James A. Rhodes Arena (593); Akron, OH
MAC regular season
December 31, 2017; 2:00 pm		at Western Michigan	L 60–73	7–5 (0–1)	University Arena (831); Kalamazoo, MI
January 4, 2017; 7:00 pm		at Central Michigan	L 62–89	7–6 (0–2)	McGuirk Arena (1,348); Mount Pleasant, MI
January 7, 2017; 2:00 pm		Bowling Green	L 58–62	7–7 (0–3)	James A. Rhodes Arena (634); Akron, OH
January 11, 2017; 7:00 pm		Ohio	L 69–85	7–8 (0–4)	James A. Rhodes Arena (650); Akron, OH
January 14, 2017; 2:00 pm		at Ball State	L 70–80	7–9 (0–5)	Worthen Arena (1,015); Muncie, IN
January 18, 2017; 12:00 pm		at Northern Illinois	W 84–55	8–9 (1–5)	Convocation Center (1,279); DeKalb, IL
January 21, 2017; 2:00 pm		Western Michigan	L 57–73	8–10 (1–6)	James A. Rhodes Arena (661); Akron, OH
January 28, 2017; 5:00 pm		Eastern Michigan	W 80–62	9–10 (2–6)	James A. Rhodes Arena (1,806); Akron, OH
February 1, 2017; 7:00 pm		Ball State	L 63–90	9–11 (2–7)	James A. Rhodes Arena (629); Akron, OH
February 4, 2017; 7:00 pm		at Bowling Green	L 50–86	9–12 (2–8)	Stroh Center (1,406); Bowling Green, OH
February 8, 2017; 7:00 pm		at Miami (OH)	L 49–54	9–13 (2–9)	Millett Hall (303); Oxford, OH
February 11, 2017; 2:00 pm		Kent State; Crystal Clinic Wagon Wheel Challenge	L 58–72	9–14 (2–10)	James A. Rhodes Arena (961); Akron, OH
February 15, 2017; 7:00 pm		Toledo	L 57–61	9–15 (2–11)	James A. Rhodes Arena (516); Akron, OH
February 18, 2017; 1:00 pm		at Buffalo	L 51–81	9–16 (2–12)	Alumni Arena (1,141); Amherst, NY
February 22, 2017; 7:00 pm		Miami (OH)	L 62–66	9–17 (2–13)	James A. Rhodes Arena (538); Akron, OH
February 25, 2017; 2:00 pm		at Kent State; Crystal Clinic Wagon Wheel Challenge	L 69–73	9–18 (2–14)	Memorial Athletic and Convocation Center (1,073); Kent, OH
March 1, 2017; 7:00 pm		Buffalo	L 55–81	9–19 (2–15)	James A. Rhodes Arena (607); Akron, OH
March 4, 2017; 2:00 pm		at Ohio	L 48–62	9–20 (2–16)	Convocation Center (2,725); Athens, OH
MAC Tournament
March 6, 2017; 5:30 pm	(11)	at (6) Toledo; Opening Round	L 37–65	9–21	Savage Arena (3,627); Toledo, OH
*Non-conference game. ^{#}Rankings from AP Poll. (#) Tournament seedings in parentheses. All times are in Eastern Time.

== See also ==
- 2016–17 Akron Zips men's basketball team
