= 2016–17 Buffalo Bulls women's basketball team =

Intercollegiate basketball season

2016–17 Buffalo Bulls women's basketball
- Conference: Mid-American Conference
- East Division
- Record: 22–10 (10–8 MAC)
- Head coach: Felisha Legette-Jack (5th season)
- Assistant coaches: Cherie Cordoba; Ashley Zuber; Kristen Sharkey
- Home arena: Alumni Arena

2016–17 Mid-American Conference women's basketball standings
	Conf.				Overall
Team	W		L	PCT	W		L	PCT
East
Kent State	13	–	5	.722	19	–	13	.594
Ohio	12	–	6	.667	22	–	10	.688
Buffalo	10	–	8	.556	22	–	10	.688
Miami (OH)	5	–	13	.278	11	–	21	.344
Bowling Green	4	–	14	.222	8	–	23	.258
Akron	2	–	16	.111	9	–	21	.300
West
Central Michigan	15	–	3	.833	23	–	9	.719
Ball State	14	–	4	.778	21	–	11	.656
Toledo †	12	–	6	.667	25	–	9	.735
Northern Illinois	12	–	6	.667	21	–	12	.636
Western Michigan	8	–	10	.444	19	–	13	.594
Eastern Michigan	1	–	17	.056	6	–	25	.194
† 2017 MAC tournament winner As of March 17, 2017

The 2016–17 Buffalo Bulls women's basketball team represented the University at Buffalo during the 2016–17 NCAA Division I women's basketball season. The Bulls, led by fifth-year head coach Felisha Legette-Jack, played their home games at Alumni Arena as members of the East Division of the Mid-American Conference. They finished the season 22–10, 10–8 in MAC play to finish in third place in the East Division. They advanced to the semifinals of the MAC women's tournament, where they lost to Toledo. Despite having 22 wins, they were not invited to a postseason tournament.

== Roster ==
2016–17 Buffalo Bulls women's basketball team
Players
Coaches

Pos.	#	Name	Height	Year	Previous school	Hometown
F	0	Summer Hemphill	6 ft 1 in (1.85 m)	Fr	Cardinal O'Hara	Buffalo, NY
G	1	Stephanie Reid	5 ft 6 in (1.68 m)	Jr	The Peninsula School	Melbourne, Australia
F	2	Lawrencia Moten	6 ft 2 in (1.88 m)	Fr	Bullis School	Bowie, MD
G	3	Liisa Ups	5 ft 9 in (1.75 m)	Jr	Smith's Hill	Wollongong, Australia
G	4	Joanna Smith	5 ft 8 in (1.73 m)	Sr	Southaven	Southaven, MS
G	5	Katherine Ups	5 ft 9 in (1.75 m)	Jr	Smith's Hill	Wollongong, Australia
G	10	Gabi Bade	5 ft 8 in (1.73 m)	So	Pinewood School	Milpitas, CA
G	11	Theresa Onwuka	5 ft 10 in (1.78 m)	So	Lake Forest Academy	Asaba, Nigeria
F	12	Courtney Wilkins	6 ft 1 in (1.85 m)	So	Haileybury College	Melbourne, Australia
F	21	Mariah Suchan	6 ft 1 in (1.85 m)	Jr	Maize South	Wichita, KS
G	22	Ayoleka Sodade	5 ft 9 in (1.75 m)	So	Holy Names Catholic	Windsor, ON
G	24	Cierra Dillard (redshirt)	5 ft 9 in (1.75 m)	Jr	Gates Chili; Massachusetts	Rochester, NY
C	31	Cassie Oursler	6 ft 3 in (1.91 m)	Jr	Grand Island	Grand Island, NY
F	32	Brittany Morrison	5 ft 9 in (1.75 m)	So	St. Joseph Academy	North Ridgeville, OH

Head coach

- Felisha Legette-Jack (Syracuse)

Assistant coach(es)

- Cherie Cordoba (UNLV)
- Ashley Zuber (Buffalo)
- Kristen Sharkey (Buffalo)

Legend

- (C) Team captain
- (S) Suspended
- (I) Ineligible
- (W) Walk-on
- Injured
- Current redshirt

Roster

== Schedule ==
Date time, TV	Rank^{#}	Opponent^{#}	Result	Record	Site (attendance) city, state
Exhibition
November 4, 2016*; 6:00 pm, ESPN3		Bloomsburg	W 65–45	–	Alumni Arena; Buffalo, NY
Non-conference regular season
November 11, 2016*; 7:00 pm, ESPN3		Massachusetts	W 61–47	1–0	Alumni Arena (1,719); Buffalo, NY
November 16, 2016*; 7:00 pm, ESPN3		Niagara	W 73–63	2–0	Alumni Arena (811); Buffalo, NY
November 19, 2016*; 2:00 pm, ESPN3		Manhattan	W 73–39	3–0	Alumni Arena (816); Buffalo, NY
November 22, 2016*; 1:00 pm		at Duquesne	W 71–69	4–0	Palumbo Center (385); Pittsburgh, PA
November 26, 2016*; 2:00 pm, ESPN3		Sacred Heart	W 76–55	5–0	Alumni Arena (992); Buffalo, NY
December 1, 2016*; 7:00 pm, ESPN3		Central Florida	W 66–65	6–0	Alumni Arena (846); Buffalo, NY
December 4, 2016*; 12:00 pm, ESPN3		Hofstra	W 74–50	7–0	Alumni Arena; Buffalo, NY
December 8, 2016*; 7:00 pm		at Canisius	W 65–52	8–0	Koessler Athletic Center (943); Buffalo, NY
December 21, 2016*; 12:00 pm, ESPN3		St. Bonaventure	W 68–47	9–0	Alumni Arena (1,644); Buffalo, NY
December 29, 2016*; 12:00 pm		at Fordham; Fordham Holiday Classic semifinals	W 58–54	10–0	Rose Hill Gymnasium; Bronx, NY
December 30, 2016*; 2:30 pm		vs. Harvard; Fordham Holiday Classic championship	L 62–74	10–1	Rose Hill Gymnasium; Bronx, NY
MAC regular season
December 31, 2016; 6:00 pm, ESPN3		Miami (OH)	W 71–45	11–1 (1–0)	Alumni Arena (1,350); Buffalo, NY
January 4, 2017; 7:00 pm, BCSN/SPCSN		at Ohio	L 55–83	11–2 (1–1)	Convocation Center (1,346); Athens, OH
January 7, 2017; 1:00 pm		at Central Michigan	L 71–88	11–3 (1–2)	McGuirk Arena (1,657); Mount Pleasant, MI
January 11, 2017; 7:00 pm, BCSN/SPCSN		Toledo	L 64–73	11–4 (1–3)	Alumni Arena (1,102); Buffalo, NY
January 14, 2017; 1:00 pm		at Miami (OH)	W 68–51	12–4 (2–3)	Millett Hall (1,003); Oxford, OH
January 18, 2017; 7:00 pm		at Bowling Green	W 61–50	13–4 (3–3)	Stroh Center (1,389); Bowling Green, OH
January 21, 2017; 12:00 pm, BCSN/SPCSN		Central Michigan	W 67–56	14–4 (4–3)	Alumni Arena (1,438); Buffalo, NY
January 25, 2017; 7:00 pm, ESPN3		Ball State	L 75–89	14–5 (4–4)	Alumni Arena (1,189); Buffalo, NY
January 28, 2017; 2:00 pm		at Western Michigan	W 62–47	15–5 (5–4)	University Arena (989); Kalamazoo, MI
February 1, 2017; 7:00 pm		at Toledo	L 63–85	15–6 (5–5)	Savage Arena (3,410); Toledo, OH
February 4, 2017; 2:00 pm, ESPN3		Kent State	W 77–62	16–6 (6–5)	Alumni Arena (1,889); Buffalo, NY
February 11, 2017; 2:00 pm, ESPN3		Northern Illinois	L 80–89	16–7 (6–6)	Alumni Arena (1,532); Buffalo, NY
February 15, 2017; 7:00 pm		at Eastern Michigan	W 56-52	17–7 (7–6)	Convocation Center (574); Ypsilanti, MI
February 18, 2017; 1:00 pm, ESPN3		Akron	W 81–51	18–7 (8–6)	Alumni Arena (1,141); Buffalo, NY
February 22, 2017; 7:00 pm, ESPN3		Ohio	W 65-54	19–7 (9–6)	Alumni Arena (1,220); Buffalo, NY
February 25, 2017; 1:00 pm, ESPN3		Bowling Green	L 62–64	19–8 (9–7)	Alumni Arena (1,604); Buffalo, NY
March 1, 2017; 7:00 pm		at Akron	W 81-55	20–8 (10–7)	Rhodes Arena (607); Akron, OH
March 4, 2017; 2:00 pm		at Kent State	L 71–80	20–9 (10–8)	MAC Center (887); Kent, OH
MAC Women's Tournament
March 6, 2017; 5:30 pm, ESPN3	(7)	(10) Bowling Green; First Round	W 61–45	21–9	Alumni Arena (1,221); Buffalo, NY
March 8, 2017*; 4:55 pm, BCSN/SPCSN	(7)	vs. (2) Ball State; Quarterfinals	W 69–65	22–9	Quicken Loans Arena; Cleveland, OH
March 10, 2017*; 4:55 pm, BCSN/SPCSN	(7)	vs. (6) Toledo; Semifinals	L 65–72	22–10	Quicken Loans Arena (1,277); Cleveland, OH
*Non-conference game. ^{#}Rankings from AP Poll. (#) Tournament seedings in parentheses. All times are in Eastern Time.

== See also ==
2016–17 Buffalo Bulls men's basketball team
