= 2016–17 Central Michigan Chippewas women's basketball team =

Intercollegiate basketball season

2016–17 Central Michigan Chippewas women's basketball

MAC West Division Champions MAC regular season champions

WNIT, first round
- Conference: Mid-American Conference
- West Division
- Record: 23–9 (15–3 MAC)
- Head coach: Sue Guevara (10th season)
- Assistant coaches: Heather Oesterle; Raina Harmon; Kristin Haynie
- Home arena: McGuirk Arena

2016–17 Mid-American Conference women's basketball standings
	Conf.				Overall
Team	W		L	PCT	W		L	PCT
East
Kent State	13	–	5	.722	19	–	13	.594
Ohio	12	–	6	.667	22	–	10	.688
Buffalo	10	–	8	.556	22	–	10	.688
Miami (OH)	5	–	13	.278	11	–	21	.344
Bowling Green	4	–	14	.222	8	–	23	.258
Akron	2	–	16	.111	9	–	21	.300
West
Central Michigan	15	–	3	.833	23	–	9	.719
Ball State	14	–	4	.778	21	–	11	.656
Toledo †	12	–	6	.667	25	–	9	.735
Northern Illinois	12	–	6	.667	21	–	12	.636
Western Michigan	8	–	10	.444	19	–	13	.594
Eastern Michigan	1	–	17	.056	6	–	25	.194
† 2017 MAC tournament winner As of March 17, 2017

The 2016–17 Central Michigan Chippewas women's basketball team represented Central Michigan University during the 2016–17 NCAA Division I women's basketball season. The Chippewas, led by tenth-year head coach Sue Guevara, played their home games at McGuirk Arena as members of the West Division of the Mid-American Conference (MAC). They finished the season 23–9 overall, 15–3 during MAC play, to finish in first place, and win the MAC West Division, and MAC regular season championships. As the No. 1 seed in the MAC tournament, they were upset by No. 8 seed Western Michigan in the quarterfinals. They received an automatic bid to the 2017 Women's National Invitation Tournament, where they lost in the first round at Wright State.

== Schedule ==
Date time, TV	Rank^{#}	Opponent^{#}	Result	Record	Site (attendance) city, state
Non-conference regular season
November 11, 2016*; 7:00 p.m.		at No. 1 Notre Dame; Preseason WNIT	L 47–107	0–1	Purcell Pavilion (8,454); Notre Dame, IN
November 18, 2016*; 7:00 p.m.		Furman; Preseason WNIT	W 81–71	1–1	McGuirk Arena (497); Mount Pleasant, MI
November 19, 2016*; 7:00 p.m.		Elon; Preseason WNIT	L 57–71	1–2	McGuirk Arena (454); Mount Pleasant, MI
November 22, 2016*; 7:00 p.m.		Oakland	W 70–67 ^{2OT}	2–2	McGuirk Arena; Mount Pleasant, MI
November 25, 2016*; 4:30 p.m.		vs. Utah Valley; Cal Poly Tournament	W 71–62	3–2	Mott Athletics Center; San Luis Obispo, CA
November 26, 2016*; 2:00 p.m.		vs. North Dakota State; Cal Poly Tournament	W 77–55	4–2	Mott Athletics Center; San Luis Obispo, CA
December 1, 2016*; 12:00 p.m.		Loyola–Chicago	W 95–57	5–2	McGuirk Arena; Mount Pleasant, MI
December 3, 2016*; 1:00 p.m.		UIC	W 77–55	6–2	McGuirk Arena; Mount Pleasant, MI
December 6, 2016*; 7:00 p.m.		at Purdue	L 51–62	6–3	Mackey Arena; West Lafayette, IN
December 9, 2016*; 7:00 p.m.		Saint Joseph's	W 73–71 ^{OT}	7–3	McGuirk Arena; Mount Pleasant, MI
December 19, 2016*; 7:00 p.m.		Illinois	W 82–51	8–3	McGuirk Arena; Mount Pleasant, MI
December 28, 2016*; 7:00 p.m.		at Middle Tennessee State	L 69–79	8–4	Murphy Center; Murfreesboro, TN
MAC regular season
December 31, 2016; 1:00 p.m.		at Kent State	W 91–78	9–4 (1–0)	Memorial Athletic and Convocation Center; Kent, OH
January 4, 2017; 7:00 p.m.		Akron	W 89–62	10–4 (2–0)	McGuirk Arena; Mount Pleasant, MI
January 7, 2017; 1:00 p.m.		Buffalo	W 88–71	11–4 (3–0)	McGuirk Arena; Mount Pleasant, MI
January 11, 2017; 7:00 p.m.		Ball State	W 101–92	12–4 (4–0)	McGuirk Arena; Mount Pleasant, MI
January 14, 2017; 2:30 p.m.		at Bowling Green	W 76–65 ^{OT}	13–4 (5–0)	Stroh Center; Bowling Green, OH
January 18, 2017; 7:00 p.m.		Miami (OH)	W 80–61	14–4 (6–0)	McGuirk Arena; Mount Pleasant, MI
January 21, 2017; 12:00 p.m.		at Buffalo	L 56–67	14–5 (6–1)	Alumni Arena; Buffalo, NY
January 28, 2017; 4:30 p.m.		at Toledo	L 72–74	14–6 (6–2)	Savage Arena; Toledo, OH
February 1, 2017; 6:00 p.m.		Ohio	W 64–59	15–6 (7–2)	McGuirk Arena; Mount Pleasant, MI
February 4, 2017; 2:00 p.m.		at Eastern Michigan	W 104–63	16–6 (8–2)	Convocation Center; Ypsilanti, MI
February 8, 2017; 8:00 p.m.		at NIU	W 109–94	17–6 (9–2)	Convocation Center; Dekalb, IL
February 11, 2017; 1:00 p.m.		Western Michigan	W 94–83	18–6 (10–2)	McGuirk Arena; Mount Pleasant, MI
February 15, 2017; 7:00 p.m.		at Ohio	W 70–64	19–6 (11–2)	Convocation Center; Athens, OH
February 18, 2017; 12:00 p.m.		Toledo	W 72–61	20–6 (12–2)	McGuirk Arena; Mount Pleasant, MI
February 22, 2017; 7:00 p.m.		NIU	W 109–86	21–6 (13–2)	McGuirk Arena; Mount Pleasant, MI
February 25, 2017; 2:00 p.m.		at Ball State	L 73–81	21–7 (13–3)	Worthen Arena; Muncie, IN
March 1, 2017; 7:00 p.m.		at Western Michigan	W 94–73	22–7 (14–3)	University Arena; Kalamazoo, MI
March 4, 2017; 1:00 p.m.		Eastern Michigan	W 71–48	23–7 (15–3)	McGuirk Arena; Mount Pleasant, MI
MAC tournament
March 8, 2017; 12:00 p.m.	(1)	(8) Western Michigan; Quarterfinals	L 63–67	23–8	Quicken Loans Arena; Cleveland, OH
WNIT
March 16, 2017; 7:00 p.m.		at Wright State; First round	L 64–66	23–9	Nutter Center; Fairborn, Ohio
*Non-conference game. ^{#}Rankings from AP poll. (#) Tournament seedings in parentheses. All times are in Eastern.

== See also ==
- 2016–17 Central Michigan Chippewas men's basketball team
