= 2016–17 Ball State Cardinals women's basketball team =

Intercollegiate basketball season

2016–17 Ball State Cardinals women's basketball

WNIT, First Round
- Conference: Mid-American Conference
- West Division
- Record: 21–8 (14–3 MAC)
- Head coach: Brady Sallee (5th season)
- Assistant coaches: Tennille Adams; Audrey McDonald-Spencer; Ryan Patterson
- Home arena: Worthen Arena

2016–17 Mid-American Conference women's basketball standings
	Conf.				Overall
Team	W		L	PCT	W		L	PCT
East
Kent State	13	–	5	.722	19	–	13	.594
Ohio	12	–	6	.667	22	–	10	.688
Buffalo	10	–	8	.556	22	–	10	.688
Miami (OH)	5	–	13	.278	11	–	21	.344
Bowling Green	4	–	14	.222	8	–	23	.258
Akron	2	–	16	.111	9	–	21	.300
West
Central Michigan	15	–	3	.833	23	–	9	.719
Ball State	14	–	4	.778	21	–	11	.656
Toledo †	12	–	6	.667	25	–	9	.735
Northern Illinois	12	–	6	.667	21	–	12	.636
Western Michigan	8	–	10	.444	19	–	13	.594
Eastern Michigan	1	–	17	.056	6	–	25	.194
† 2017 MAC tournament winner As of March 17, 2017

The 2016–17 Ball State Cardinals women's basketball team represented Ball State University during the 2016–17 NCAA Division I Women's Basketball Championship season. The Cardinals, led by fifth-year head coach Brady Sallee, played their home games at Worthen Arena as members of the West Division of the Mid-American Conference.

The Cardinals lost to Indiana in the first round of the WNIT.

== Schedule ==
Date time, TV	Rank^{#}	Opponent^{#}	Result	Record	Site (attendance) city, state
Non-conference regular season
November 11, 2016*; 11:00 am, ESPN3		Arkansas Pine Bluff	W 88–60	1–0	Worthen Arena (1,683); Muncie, IN
November 16, 2016*; 7:00 pm, ESPN3		Evansville	W 84–49	2–0	Worthen Arena (1,012); Muncie, IN
November 22, 2016*; 4:30 pm		vs. Auburn; Savannah Invitational First Round	L 40–54	2–1	Savannah Civic Center; Savannah, GA
November 23, 2016*; 2:00 pm		vs. North Carolina A&T; Savannah Invitational Second Round	W 76–57	3–1	Savannah Civic Center; Savannah, GA
November 24, 2016*; 4:30 pm		vs. East Carolina; Savannah Invitational Third Round	L 69–82	3–2	Savannah Civic Center; Savannah, GA
December 1, 2016*; 7:00 pm, ESPN3		Chicago State	W 88–53	4–2	Worthen Arena (851); Muncie, IN
December 4, 2016*; 1:00 pm		at Butler	W 74–50	5–2	Hinkle Fieldhouse (786); Indianapolis, IN
December 8, 2016*; 7:00 pm, ESPN3		Purdue	L 42–58	5–3	Worthen Arena (2,510); Muncie, IN
December 11, 2016*; 3:00 pm, ESPN3		at Oakland	W 66–59	6–3	Athletics Center O'rena (552); Rochester, MI
December 18, 2016*; 2:00 pm, ESPN3		Lipscomb	L 74–78	6–4	Worthen Arena (892); Muncie, IN
December 21, 2016*; 8:00 pm		at Western Kentucky	L 61–68	6–5	E. A. Diddle Arena (1,759); Bowling Green, KY
December 28, 2016*; 7:00 pm, ESPN3		Urbana	W 93–49	7–5	Worthen Arena (706); Muncie, IN
MAC regular season
December 31, 2016; 12:00 pm		at Toledo	W 51–45	8–5 (1–0)	Savage Arena (3,509); Toledo, OH
January 4, 2017; 7:00 pm, ESPN3		Kent State	W 71–47	9–5 (2–0)	Worthen Arena (820); Muncie, IN
January 7, 2017; 3:30 pm, ESPN3		Western Michigan	W 61–56	10–5 (3–0)	Worthen Arena (2,645); Muncie, IN
January 11, 2017; 7:00 pm		at Central Michigan	L 92–101	10–6 (3–1)	McGuirk Arena (1,471); Mount Pleasant, MI
January 14, 2017; 2:00 pm, ESPN3		Akron	W 80–70	11–6 (4–1)	Worthen Arena (1,015); Muncie, IN
January 18, 2017; 7:00 pm, ESPN3		Eastern Michigan	W 78–49	12–6 (5–1)	Worthen Arena (954); Muncie, IN
January 21, 2017; 12:00 pm		at Bowling Green	W 75–53	13–6 (6–1)	Stroh Center (2,953); Bowling Green, OH
January 25, 2017; 7:00 pm		at Buffalo	W 89–75	14–6 (7–1)	Alumni Arena (1,189); Buffalo, NY
January 28, 2017; 3:30 pm, ESPN3		Northern Illinois	L 96–101	14–7 (7–2)	Worthen Arena (4,298); Muncie, IN
February 1, 2017; 7:00 pm		at Akron	W 90–63	15–7 (8–2)	Rhodes Arena (629); Akron, OH
February 4, 2017; 1:00 pm		at Miami (OH)	W 81–60	16–7 (9–2)	Millett Hall (394); Oxford, OH
February 8, 2017; 7:00 pm, ESPN3		Bowling Green	W 91–70	17–7 (10–2)	Worthen Arena (1,153); Muncie, IN
February 11, 2017; 3:30 pm, ESPN3		Ohio	L 68–72	17–8 (10–3)	Worthen Arena (1,011); Muncie, IN
February 18, 2017; 1:00 pm		at Northern Illinois	W 92–84	18–8 (11–3)	Convocation Center; DeKalb, IL
February 22, 2017; 7:00 pm		at Western Michigan	W 83–72	19–8 (12–3)	University Arena (683); Kalamazoo, MI
February 25, 2017; 2:00 pm, ESPN3		Central Michigan	W 81–73	20–8 (13–3)	Worthen Arena (1,427); Muncie, IN
March 1, 2017; 7:00 pm		at Eastern Michigan	W 64–54	21–8 (14–3)	Convocation Center (704); Ypsilanti, MI
March 4, 2017; 2:00 pm, ESPN3		Toledo	L 66–76	21–9 (14–4)	Worthen Arena (1,785); Muncie, IN
MAC Tournament
March 8, 2017*; 4:50 pm, ESPN3		vs. Buffalo	L 65–69	21–10 (14–4)	Quicken Loans Arena; Cleveland, Ohio
Women's NIT
March 16, 2017*; 7:00 pm, CBS		at Indiana; Round 1	L 58–71	21–11 (14–4)	Simon Skjodt Assembly Hall (2,028); Bloomington, Indiana
*Non-conference game. ^{#}Rankings from AP Poll. (#) Tournament seedings in parentheses. All times are in Eastern Time.

== See also ==
- 2016–17 Ball State Cardinals men's basketball team
