= 2016–17 Northern Illinois Huskies women's basketball team =

Intercollegiate basketball season

2016–17 Northern Illinois Huskies women's basketball

WNIT, First round
- Conference: Mid-American Conference
- West Division
- Record: 21–12 (12–6 MAC)
- Head coach: Lisa Carlsen (2nd season)
- Assistant coaches: Kierra McCleary; John McGinty; Stephanie Smith
- Home arena: Convocation Center

2016–17 Mid-American Conference women's basketball standings
| | Conf. | | | | Overall |
| Team | W | | L | PCT | W | | L | PCT |
|---|---|---|---|---|---|---|---|---|
East
| Kent State | 13 | – | 5 | .722 | 19 | – | 13 | .594 |
| Ohio | 12 | – | 6 | .667 | 22 | – | 10 | .688 |
| Buffalo | 10 | – | 8 | .556 | 22 | – | 10 | .688 |
| Miami (OH) | 5 | – | 13 | .278 | 11 | – | 21 | .344 |
| Bowling Green | 4 | – | 14 | .222 | 8 | – | 23 | .258 |
| Akron | 2 | – | 16 | .111 | 9 | – | 21 | .300 |
West
| Central Michigan | 15 | – | 3 | .833 | 23 | – | 9 | .719 |
| Ball State | 14 | – | 4 | .778 | 21 | – | 11 | .656 |
| Toledo † | 12 | – | 6 | .667 | 25 | – | 9 | .735 |
| Northern Illinois | 12 | – | 6 | .667 | 21 | – | 12 | .636 |
| Western Michigan | 8 | – | 10 | .444 | 19 | – | 13 | .594 |
| Eastern Michigan | 1 | – | 17 | .056 | 6 | – | 25 | .194 |
† 2017 MAC tournament winner As of March 17, 2017

The 2016–17 Northern Illinois Huskies women's basketball team represented Northern Illinois University during the 2016–17 NCAA Division I women's basketball season. The Huskies, led by second-year head coach Lisa Carlsen, played their home games at the Convocation Center in DeKalb, Illinois as members of the West Division of the Mid-American Conference. They finished the season 21–12, 12–6 in MAC play to finish in a tie for third place in the West division. They defeated Ohio and Western Michigan in the MAC tournament before losing to Toledo in the championship. They received an at-large bid to the WNIT where they lost in the first round to South Dakota State.

== Previous season ==
The Huskies finished the 2015–16 season 11–19, 4–14 in MAC play to finished in last place in the West division. They lost to Western Michigan in the first round of the MAC tournament.

== Schedule and results ==
| Date time, TV | Rank^{#} | Opponent^{#} | Result | Record | Site (attendance) city, state |
Exhibition
| Nov 5, 2016*; 1:00 pm | | Lakeland College | W 111–49 | | Convocation Center (288); DeKalb, IL |
Non-conference regular season
| Nov 11, 2016*; 5:00 pm | | at Loyola–Chicago | W 90–70 | 1–0 | Gentile Arena; Chicago, IL |
| Nov 16, 2016*; 5:30 pm | | Milwaukee | W 114–104 ^{2OT} | 2–0 | Convocation Center; DeKalb, IL |
| Nov 19, 2016*; 4:30 pm | | at Western Illinois | L 79–83 | 2–1 | Western Hall (562); Macomb, IL |
| Nov 22, 2016*; 7:00 pm | | Chicago State | W 94–85 | 3–1 | Convocation Center (276); DeKalb, IL |
| Nov 26, 2016*; 6:00 pm | | Illinois State | W 108–65 | 4–1 | Convocation Center (1,398); DeKalb, IL |
| Nov 30, 2016*; 7:00 pm | | at Drake | L 86–95 | 4–2 | Knapp Center (2,016); Des Moines, IA |
| Dec 2, 2016*; 7:00 pm | | at Bradley | W 81–51 | 5–2 | Renaissance Coliseum (661); Peoria, IL |
| Dec 11, 2016*; 2:00 pm | | at Iowa State | L 89–97 | 5–3 | Hilton Coliseum (9,825); Ames, IA |
| Dec 16, 2016*; 7:00 pm | | SIU Edwardsville | W 97–78 | 6–3 | Convocation Center (304); DeKalb, IL |
| Dec 19, 2016*; 5:30 pm | | vs. South Dakota; UMKC Classic | L 83–97 | 6–4 | Swinney Recreation Center (220); Kansas City, MO |
| Dec 20, 2016*; 3:30 pm | | at UMKC; UMKC Classic | W 86–75 | 7–4 | Swinney Recreation Center (200); Kansas City, MO |
MAC regular season
| Dec 31, 2016; 1:00 pm, ESPN3 | | Eastern Michigan | W 85–73 | 8–4 (1–0) | Convocation Center (1,086); DeKalb, IL |
| Jan 4, 2017; 6:00 pm, ESPN3 | | at Bowling Green | W 89–76 | 9–4 (2–0) | Stroh Center (1,216); Bowling Green, OH |
| Jan 7, 2017; 1:00 pm, ESPN3 | | Ohio | W 88–80 | 10–4 (3–0) | Convocation Center; DeKalb, IL |
| Jan 11, 2017; 6:00 pm, ESPN3 | | at Kent State | W 98–97 | 11–4 (4–0) | M.A.C. Center (240); Kent, OH |
| Jan 14, 2017; 1:00 pm, ESPN3 | | at Toledo | W 77–73 | 12–4 (5–0) | Savage Arena (3,758); Toledo, OH |
| Jan 18, 2017; 11:00 am, ESPN3 | | Akron | W 84–55 | 12–5 (5–1) | Convocation Center (1,279); DeKalb, IL |
| Jan 21, 2017; 1:00 pm, ESPN3 | | Miami (OH) | W 89–76 | 13–5 (6–1) | Convocation Center (2,168); DeKalb, IL |
| Jan 25, 2017; 7:00 pm, ESPN3 | | Kent State | W 93–72 | 14–5 (7–1) | Convocation Center (507); DeKalb, IL |
| Jan 28, 2017; 2:30 pm, ESPN3 | | at Ball State | W 101–96 | 15–5 (8–1) | Worthen Arena; Muncie, IN |
| Feb 4, 2017; 1:00 pm, ESPN3 | | Western Michigan | W 67–62 | 16–5 (9–1) | Convocation Center (2,543); DeKalb, IL |
| Feb 8, 2017; 8:00 pm, ESPN3 | | Central Michigan | L 94–104 | 16–6 (9–2) | Convocation Center (503); DeKalb, IL |
| Feb 11, 2017; 1:00 pm | | at Buffalo | W 89–80 | 17–6 (10–2) | Alumni Arena (1,532); Buffalo, NY |
| Feb 15, 2017; 6:00 pm, ESPN3 | | at Miami (OH) | W 63–61 | 18–6 (11–2) | Millett Hall; Oxford, OH |
| Feb 18, 2017; 1:00 pm | | Ball State | L 84–92 | 18–7 (11–3) | Convocation Center; DeKalb, IL |
| Feb 22, 2017; 6:00 pm | | at Central Michigan | L 86–109 | 18–8 (11–4) | McGuirk Arena; Mount Pleasant, MI |
| Feb 25, 2017; 1:30 pm | | at Eastern Michigan | W 81–71 | 19–8 (12–4) | Convocation Center; Ypsilanti, MI |
| Mar 1, 2017; 7:00 pm | | Toledo | L 75–79 | 19–9 (12–5) | Convocation Center; DeKalb, IL |
| Mar 4, 2017; 2:00 pm | | at Western Michigan | L 77–90 | 19–10 (12–6) | University Arena; Kalamazoo, MI |
MAC Tournament
| Mar 8, 2017; 1:20 pm, ESPN3 | (4) | vs. (5) Ohio; Quarterfinals | W 72–71 | 20–10 | Quicken Loans Arena; Cleveland, OH |
| Mar 9, 2017; 10:00 am | (4) | vs. (8) Western Michigan; Semifinals | W 83–55 | 21–10 | Quicken Loans Arena; Cleveland, OH |
| Mar 11, 2017; 10:00 am, CBSSN | (4) | vs. (6) Toledo; Championship | L 71–82 | 21–11 | Quicken Loans Arena (1,589); Cleveland, OH |
WNIT
| Mar 16, 2017; 7:00 pm | | at South Dakota State; First round | L 84–94 | 21–12 | Frost Arena (2,610); Brookings, SD |
*Non-conference game. ^{#}Rankings from AP Poll. (#) Tournament seedings in parentheses. All times are in Eastern Time Source.

== See also ==
- 2016–17 Northern Illinois Huskies men's basketball team
