= 2016–17 Miami RedHawks women's basketball team =

Intercollegiate basketball season

2016–17 Miami RedHawks women's basketball
- Conference: Mid-American Conference
- East Division
- Record: 11–21 (5–13 MAC)
- Head coach: Cleve Wright (4th season)
- Assistant coaches: Colleen Day; Ashley Saia; Alioune Ndiaye
- Home arena: Millett Hall

2016–17 Mid-American Conference women's basketball standings
	Conf.				Overall
Team	W		L	PCT	W		L	PCT
East
Kent State	13	–	5	.722	19	–	13	.594
Ohio	12	–	6	.667	22	–	10	.688
Buffalo	10	–	8	.556	22	–	10	.688
Miami (OH)	5	–	13	.278	11	–	21	.344
Bowling Green	4	–	14	.222	8	–	23	.258
Akron	2	–	16	.111	9	–	21	.300
West
Central Michigan	15	–	3	.833	23	–	9	.719
Ball State	14	–	4	.778	21	–	11	.656
Toledo †	12	–	6	.667	25	–	9	.735
Northern Illinois	12	–	6	.667	21	–	12	.636
Western Michigan	8	–	10	.444	19	–	13	.594
Eastern Michigan	1	–	17	.056	6	–	25	.194
† 2017 MAC tournament winner As of March 17, 2017

The 2016–17 Miami RedHawks women's basketball team represented Miami University during the 2016–17 NCAA Division I women's basketball season. The RedHawks, led by fourth year head coach Cleve Wright, played their home games at Millett Hall, as members of the East Division of the Mid-American Conference.

The RedHawks lost to Western Michigan in the first round of the MAC tournament.

== Schedule ==
Date time, TV	Rank^{#}	Opponent^{#}	Result	Record	Site (attendance) city, state
Non-conference regular season
November 11, 2016*; 1 p.m.		Austin Peay Governors	W 73 – 58	0–0	Dunn Center (–); Clarksville, TN
November 15, 2016*; 7 p.m.		Northern Kentucky Norse	W 60 – 50	–	BB&T Arena (–); Newport, KY
November 19, 2016*; 12:00 p.m.		Morehead State Eagles	L 43 – 77	–	Ellis Johnson Arena (–); Morehead, KY
November 22, 2016*; 12:02 p.m.		Cincinnati Bearcats	L 43 - 49	–	Millett Hall (–); Oxford, OH
November 26, 2016*; 12 p.m.		La Salle Explorers	L 70 – 79	–	Trask Coliseum (–); Wilmington, NC
November 27, 2016* pm		Providence Friars	L 59 – 75	–	Trask Coliseum (–); Wilmington, NC
December __, 2016* pm					(–)
December __, 2016* pm					(–)
December __, 2016* pm					(–)
MAC regular season
January __, 2017 pm					(–)
January __, 2017 pm					(–)
January __, 2017 pm					(–)
January __, 2017 pm					(–)
January __, 2017 pm					(–)
January __, 2017 pm					(–)
January __, 2017 pm					(–)
January __, 2017 pm					(–)
January __, 2017 pm					(–)
January __, 2017 pm					(–)
January __, 2017 pm					(–)
February __, 2017 pm					(–)
February __, 2017 pm					(–)
February __, 2017 pm					(–)
February __, 2017 pm					(–)
February __, 2017 pm					(–)
February __, 2017 pm					(–)
February __, 2017 pm					(–)
February __, 2017 pm					(–)
February __, 2017 pm					(–)
MAC Tournament
TBA; TBA		TBA			TBA; TBA
*Non-conference game. ^{#}Rankings from AP Poll. (#) Tournament seedings in parentheses. All times are in Eastern Time.

== See also ==
2016–17 Miami RedHawks men's basketball team
