= 2016–17 Western Michigan Broncos women's basketball team =

Intercollegiate basketball season

2016–17 Western Michigan Broncos women's basketball
- Conference: Mid-American Conference
- West Division
- Record: 19–13 (8–10 MAC)
- Head coach: Shane Clipfell (5th season)
- Assistant coaches: Rick Albro; Tangela Smith; Cetera Washington
- Home arena: University Arena

2016–17 Mid-American Conference women's basketball standings
	Conf.				Overall
Team	W		L	PCT	W		L	PCT
East
Kent State	13	–	5	.722	19	–	13	.594
Ohio	12	–	6	.667	22	–	10	.688
Buffalo	10	–	8	.556	22	–	10	.688
Miami (OH)	5	–	13	.278	11	–	21	.344
Bowling Green	4	–	14	.222	8	–	23	.258
Akron	2	–	16	.111	9	–	21	.300
West
Central Michigan	15	–	3	.833	23	–	9	.719
Ball State	14	–	4	.778	21	–	11	.656
Toledo †	12	–	6	.667	25	–	9	.735
Northern Illinois	12	–	6	.667	21	–	12	.636
Western Michigan	8	–	10	.444	19	–	13	.594
Eastern Michigan	1	–	17	.056	6	–	25	.194
† 2017 MAC tournament winner As of March 17, 2017

The 2016–17 Western Michigan Broncos women's basketball team represented Western Michigan University during the 2016–17 NCAA Division I women's basketball season. The Broncos were led by fifth year head coach Shane Clipfell. They played their home games at University Arena as members of the West Division of the Mid-American Conference.

In the MAC tournament, the Broncos beat Miami in the first round and Central Michigan in the second round before losing to Northern Illinois in the semifinals.

== Roster ==
2016–17 Western Michigan Broncos women's basketball team
Players
Coaches

Pos.	#	Name	Height	Year	Previous school	Hometown
G	1	Meredith Shipman	5 ft 10 in (1.78 m)	Sr	Snider	Fort Wayne, IN
G	2	Alexis Parks	5 ft 4 in (1.63 m)	Jr	Africentric	Columbus, OH
G	3	Jillian Fletcher	5 ft 9 in (1.75 m)	So	Ursuline Academy; West Virginia State	Cincinnati, OH
G	4	Deja Wimby	5 ft 7 in (1.7 m)	So	Snider	Fort Wayne, IN
F	10	Breanna Mobley	6 ft 1 in (1.85 m)	So	Lansing Waverly	Lansing, MI
G	11	Kamrin Reed	5 ft 7 in (1.7 m)	Fr	Holt	Holt, MI
G	14	Najee Smith	5 ft 8 in (1.73 m)	Jr	Neuqua Valley	Naperville, IL
G	15	Aneisha Carlisle	5 ft 9 in (1.75 m)	Jr	Kalamazoo Central	Kalamazoo, MI
G	20	Logan McCane	5 ft 9 in (1.75 m)	So	Rockford	Rockford, MI
G/F	22	Meredith Miller	5 ft 10 in (1.78 m)	So	Hilliard Bradley	Hilliard, OH
G	32	LaTondra Brooks	5 ft 5 in (1.65 m)	Jr	Oak Lawn	Oak Lawn, IL
F	33	Marley Hill	6 ft 2 in (1.88 m)	RS Jr	Africentric; Cincinnati	Cleveland, OH
G	34	Jasmyn Walker (I) (redshirt)	5 ft 10 in (1.78 m)	Jr	Africentric; Valparaiso	Muskegon, MI
F	35	Asia Robeson	6 ft 4 in (1.93 m)	Jr	Kalamazoo Central	Kalamazoo, MI
F	50	Teagan Reeves	6 ft 3 in (1.91 m)	Jr	Three Rivers	Three Rivers, MI
C	52	Emma Vanzanten	6 ft 4 in (1.93 m)	Fr	Northview	Grand Rapids, MI

Head coach

- Shane Clipfell (Eastern Michigan)

Assistant coach(es)

- Rick Albro (Western Michigan)
- Tangela Smith (Iowa)
- Cetera Washington (Michigan State)

Legend

- (C) Team captain
- (S) Suspended
- (I) Ineligible
- (W) Walk-on
- Injured
- Current redshirt

Roster

== Schedule ==
Date time, TV	Rank^{#}	Opponent^{#}	Result	Record	Site (attendance) city, state
Exhibition
November 5, 2016*; 12:30 pm		Alma	W 81–33		University Arena; Kalamazoo, MI
Non-conference regular season
November 13, 2016*; 1:00 pm, ESPN3		Davidson	W 76–63	1–0	University Arena (630); Kalamazoo, MI
November __, 2016*; 7:00 pm, ESPN3		Michigan State	L 64–68 ^{OT}	1–1	University Arena (1,788); Kalamazoo, MI
November __, 2016* pm					(–)
November __, 2016* pm					(–)
December __, 2016* pm					(–)
December __, 2016* pm					(–)
December __, 2016* pm					(–)
December __, 2016* pm					(–)
December __, 2016* pm					(–)
MAC regular season
January __, 2017 pm					(–)
January __, 2017 pm					(–)
January __, 2017 pm					(–)
January __, 2017 pm					(–)
January __, 2017 pm					(–)
January __, 2017 pm					(–)
January __, 2017 pm					(–)
January __, 2017 pm					(–)
January __, 2017 pm					(–)
January __, 2017 pm					(–)
January __, 2017 pm					(–)
February __, 2017 pm					(–)
February __, 2017 pm					(–)
February __, 2017 pm					(–)
February __, 2017 pm					(–)
February __, 2017 pm					(–)
February __, 2017 pm					(–)
February __, 2017 pm					(–)
February __, 2017 pm					(–)
February __, 2017 pm					(–)
MAC Tournament
TBA; TBA		TBA			TBA; TBA
*Non-conference game. ^{#}Rankings from AP Poll. (#) Tournament seedings in parentheses. All times are in Eastern Time.

== See also ==
- 2016–17 Western Michigan Broncos men's basketball team
