= 2016–17 Eastern Michigan Eagles women's basketball team =

Intercollegiate basketball season

2016–17 Eastern Michigan Eagles women's basketball
- Conference: Mid-American Conference
- West Division
- Record: 0–0 (0–0 MAC)
- Head coach: Fred Castro (1st season)
- Assistant coaches: Adam Call; Abi Olajuwon
- Home arena: Convocation Center

2016–17 Mid-American Conference women's basketball standings
	Conf.				Overall
Team	W		L	PCT	W		L	PCT
East
Kent State	13	–	5	.722	19	–	13	.594
Ohio	12	–	6	.667	22	–	10	.688
Buffalo	10	–	8	.556	22	–	10	.688
Miami (OH)	5	–	13	.278	11	–	21	.344
Bowling Green	4	–	14	.222	8	–	23	.258
Akron	2	–	16	.111	9	–	21	.300
West
Central Michigan	15	–	3	.833	23	–	9	.719
Ball State	14	–	4	.778	21	–	11	.656
Toledo †	12	–	6	.667	25	–	9	.735
Northern Illinois	12	–	6	.667	21	–	12	.636
Western Michigan	8	–	10	.444	19	–	13	.594
Eastern Michigan	1	–	17	.056	6	–	25	.194
† 2017 MAC tournament winner As of March 17, 2017

The 2016–17 Eastern Michigan Eagles women's basketball team represented Eastern Michigan University during the 2016–17 NCAA Division I women's basketball season. The Eagles, led by first year head coach Fred Castro, played their home games at the Convocation Center, as members of the West Division of the Mid-American Conference.

The Eagles lost to Ohio in the first round of the MAC tournament.

== Schedule ==
Date time, TV	Rank^{#}	Opponent^{#}	Result	Record	Site (attendance) city, state
Non-conference regular season
November __, 2016* pm					(–)
November __, 2016* pm					(–)
November __, 2016* pm					(–)
November __, 2016* pm					(–)
December __, 2016* pm					(–)
December __, 2016* pm					(–)
December __, 2016* pm					(–)
December __, 2016* pm					(–)
December __, 2016* pm					(–)
MAC regular season
January __, 2017 pm					(–)
January __, 2017 pm					(–)
January __, 2017 pm					(–)
January __, 2017 pm					(–)
January __, 2017 pm					(–)
January __, 2017 pm					(–)
January __, 2017 pm					(–)
January __, 2017 pm					(–)
January __, 2017 pm					(–)
January __, 2017 pm					(–)
January __, 2017 pm					(–)
February __, 2017 pm					(–)
February __, 2017 pm					(–)
February __, 2017 pm					(–)
February __, 2017 pm					(–)
February __, 2017 pm					(–)
February __, 2017 pm					(–)
February __, 2017 pm					(–)
February __, 2017 pm					(–)
February __, 2017 pm					(–)
MAC Tournament
TBA; TBA		TBA			TBA; TBA
*Non-conference game. ^{#}Rankings from AP Poll. (#) Tournament seedings in parentheses. All times are in Eastern Time.

== See also ==
- 2016–17 Eastern Michigan Eagles men's basketball team
