= 2017 MAC women's basketball tournament =

College basketball tournament

- Classification: Division I
- Season: 2016–17
- Teams: 12
- First round site: Campus sites
- Quarterfinals site: Quicken Loans Arena; Cleveland, Ohio
- Semifinals site: Quicken Loans Arena; Cleveland, Ohio
- Finals site: Quicken Loans Arena; Cleveland, Ohio
- Champions: Toledo (8th title)
- Winning coach: Tricia Cullop (1st title)
- MVP: Mikaela Boyd (Toledo)
- Television: CBSSN; BCSN/SPCSN
- MAC women's basketball tournaments

2016–17 Mid-American Conference women's basketball standings
	Conf.				Overall
Team	W		L	PCT	W		L	PCT
East
Kent State	13	–	5	.722	19	–	13	.594
Ohio	12	–	6	.667	22	–	10	.688
Buffalo	10	–	8	.556	22	–	10	.688
Miami (OH)	5	–	13	.278	11	–	21	.344
Bowling Green	4	–	14	.222	8	–	23	.258
Akron	2	–	16	.111	9	–	21	.300
West
Central Michigan	15	–	3	.833	23	–	9	.719
Ball State	14	–	4	.778	21	–	11	.656
Toledo †	12	–	6	.667	25	–	9	.735
Northern Illinois	12	–	6	.667	21	–	12	.636
Western Michigan	8	–	10	.444	19	–	13	.594
Eastern Michigan	1	–	17	.056	6	–	25	.194
† 2017 MAC tournament winner As of March 17, 2017

The 2017 Mid-American Conference women's basketball tournament was a post-season basketball tournament for the Mid-American Conference (MAC) 2016–17 college basketball season. Tournament first round games were held on campus sites at the higher seed on March 6. The remaining rounds were held at Quicken Loans Arena in Cleveland between March 8–11. Toledo won their 8th MAC Women's Tournament and received the conference's automatic bid into the 2017 NCAA tournament. Mikaela Boyd of Toledo was the MVP.

== Format ==
Unlike with the recent tournaments, where the top two seeds received byes into the semifinals, with the three and four seeds receiving a bye to the quarterfinals. The tournament reverted to its original structure. The top four seeds received just one bye into the quarterfinals.

== Seeds ==
Seed	School	Conference record	Division	Tiebreaker
1†	Central Michigan	15-3		
2†	Ball State	14-4		
3†	Kent State	13-5		
4†	Northern Ill	12-6		
5	Ohio	12-6		2-1 vs. Ohio/Toledo
6	Toledo	12-6		0-3 vs. Ohio/N. ILL
7	Buffalo	10-8		
8	Western Michigan	8-10		
9	Miami (OH)	5-13		
10	Bowling Green	4-14		
11	Akron	2-16		
12	Eastern Michigan	1-17		
† – Received a Bye to quarterfinals. Overall record are as of the end of the regular season.

== Schedule ==
Game	Time	Matchup^{#}	Television
First round – Monday March 6
1	5:30 PM	#9 Miami (OH) at #8 Western Michigan	ESPN3
2	6:00 PM	#12 Eastern Michigan at #5 Ohio	ESPN3
3	5:30 PM	#10 Bowling Green at #7 Buffalo	ESPN3
4	5:30 PM	#11 Akron at #6 Toledo	ESPN3
Quarterfinals – Wednesday March 8
5	Noon	#8 Western Michigan vs. #1 Central Michigan	BCSN/SPCSN
6	2:15 PM	#5 Ohio vs. #4 Northern Illinois	BCSN/SPCSN
7	4:30 PM	#7 Buffalo vs. #2 Ball State	BCSN/SPCSN
8	6:45 PM	#6 Toledo vs. #3 Kent State	BCSN/SPCSN
Semifinals – Friday March 10
9	11:00 AM	#8 Western Michigan vs. #4 Northern Illinois	BCSN/SPCSN
10	1:30 PM	#7 Buffalo vs. #6 Toledo	BCSN/SPCSN
Championship – Saturday March 11
11	11:00 AM	#4 Northern Illinois vs #6 Toledo	CBSSN
* Game times in ET. # Rankings denote tournament seed

== Bracket ==
First round Monday, March 6
7	Buffalo	61
10	Bowling Green	45
6	Toledo	65
11	Akron	37
8	Western Michigan	73
9	Miami (OH)	66
5	Ohio	63
12	Eastern Michigan	49

Quarterfinals; Wednesday, March 8
2	Ball State	65
7	Buffalo	69
3	Kent State	63
6	Toledo	66
1	Central Michigan	63
8	Western Michigan	67
4	Northern Illinois	72
5	Ohio	71

Semifinals; Friday, March 10
7	Buffalo	65
6	Toledo	72
8	Western Michigan	55
4	Northern Illinois	83

Championship; Saturday, March 11
6	Toledo	82
4	Northern Illinois	71

First round games at campus sites of lower-numbered seeds

== All-Tournament Team ==
Tournament MVP – Mikaela Boyd, Toledo

Player	Team
Courtney Woods	Northern Illinois
Ally Lehman	Northern Illinois
Mikaela Boyd	Toledo
Mariella Santucci	Toledo
Breanna Mobley	Western Michigan

== See also ==
2017 MAC men's basketball tournament
