= 2016–17 Mid-American Conference women's basketball season =

- League: NCAA Division I
- Sport: Basketball
- Teams: 12

Regular season
- Champions: Central Michigan
- Runners-up: Ball State
- Season MVP: Larissa Lurken

Tournament
- Champions: Toledo
- Runners-up: Northern Illinois
- Finals MVP: Mikaela Boyd

Mid-American women's basketball seasons
- 2015–16 2017–18

2016–17 Mid-American Conference women's basketball standings
| | Conf. | | | | Overall |
| Team | W | | L | PCT | W | | L | PCT |
|---|---|---|---|---|---|---|---|---|
East
| Kent State | 13 | – | 5 | .722 | 19 | – | 13 | .594 |
| Ohio | 12 | – | 6 | .667 | 22 | – | 10 | .688 |
| Buffalo | 10 | – | 8 | .556 | 22 | – | 10 | .688 |
| Miami (OH) | 5 | – | 13 | .278 | 11 | – | 21 | .344 |
| Bowling Green | 4 | – | 14 | .222 | 8 | – | 23 | .258 |
| Akron | 2 | – | 16 | .111 | 9 | – | 21 | .300 |
West
| Central Michigan | 15 | – | 3 | .833 | 23 | – | 9 | .719 |
| Ball State | 14 | – | 4 | .778 | 21 | – | 11 | .656 |
| Toledo † | 12 | – | 6 | .667 | 25 | – | 9 | .735 |
| Northern Illinois | 12 | – | 6 | .667 | 21 | – | 12 | .636 |
| Western Michigan | 8 | – | 10 | .444 | 19 | – | 13 | .594 |
| Eastern Michigan | 1 | – | 17 | .056 | 6 | – | 25 | .194 |
† 2017 MAC tournament winner As of March 17, 2017

The 2016–17 Mid-American Conference women's basketball season began with practices in October 2016, followed by the start of the 2016–17 NCAA Division I women's basketball season in November. Conference play began in January 2017 and concluded in March 2017. Central Michigan won the regular season title with a record of 15–3 by one game over Ball State. Larissa Lurken of Kent State was named MAC Player of the Year.

Sixth-seeded Toledo won the MAC tournament by beating fourth-seeded Northern Illinois in the final. Toledo was placed as the #10 seed in the Stockton Region of the NCAA tournament. They lost to Creighton. Central Michigan, Ball State, Kent State, Ohio, and Northern Illinois all qualified for the WNIT.

== Preseason awards ==
The preseason coaches' poll and league awards were announced by the league office on October 27, 2016.

=== Preseason women's basketball coaches poll ===
(First place votes in parentheses)

==== East Division ====
1. Ohio (9) 69
2. Buffalo (3) 60
3. Akron 48
4. Bowling Green 30
5. Miami 27
6. Kent State 18

==== West Division ====
1. Central Michigan (12) 72
2. Ball State 53
3. Toledo 53
4. Western Michigan 34
5. Northern Illinois 25
6. Eastern Michigan 15

==== Regular season champion ====
Central Michigan (6), Ohio (5), Buffalo (1)

==== Tournament champs ====
Central Michigan (7), Ohio (4), Buffalo (1)

=== Honors ===
| Honor | Recipient |
|---|---|
| Preseason All-MAC East | Jordan Korinek, Kent State |
| Preseason All-MAC East | Quiera Lampkins, Ohio |
| Preseason All-MAC East | Hannah Plybon, Akron |
| Preseason All-MAC East | Stephanie Reid, Buffalo |
| Preseason All-MAC East | JoAnna Smith, Buffalo |
| Preseason All-MAC West | Jay-Ann Bravo-Harriott, Toledo |
| Preseason All-MAC West | Presley Hudson, Central Michigan |
| Preseason All-MAC West | Ally Lehman, Northern Illinois |
| Preseason All-MAC West | Janice Monakana, Toledo |
| Preseason All-MAC West | Tinara Moore, Central Michigan |

== Postseason ==
=== Postseason awards ===
1. Coach of the Year: Todd Starkey, Kent State
2. Player of the Year: Larissa Lurken, Kent State
3. Freshman of the Year: Lauren Dickerson, Miami
4. Defensive Player of the Year: Tinara Moore, Central Michigan
5. Sixth Man of the Year: Destiny Washington, Ball State

=== Honors ===
| Honor | Recipient |
|---|---|
| Postseason All-MAC First Team | Renee Bennett, Ball State |
| Postseason All-MAC First Team | Presley Hudson, Central Michigan |
| Postseason All-MAC First Team | Tinara Moore, Central Michigan |
| Postseason All-MAC First Team | Larissa Lurken, Kent State |
| Postseason All-MAC First Team | Ally Lehman, Northern Illinois |
| Postseason All-MAC Second Team | Moriah Monaco, Ball State |
| Postseason All-MAC Second Team | JoAnna Smith, Buffalo |
| Postseason All-MAC Second Team | Jordan Korinek, Kent State |
| Postseason All-MAC Second Team | Quiera Lampkins, Ohio |
| Postseason All-MAC Second Team | Janice Monakana, Toledo |
| Postseason All-MAC Third Team | Jewel Cotton, Central Michigan |
| Postseason All-MAC Third Team | Reyna Frost, Central Michigan |
| Postseason All-MAC Third Team | Mikaela Boyd, Toledo |
| Postseason All-MAC Third Team | Jay-Ann Bravo-Harriott, Toledo |
| Postseason All-MAC Third Team | Breanna Mobley, Western Michigan |
| Postseason All-MAC Third Team | Meredith Shipman, Western Michigan |
| Postseason All-MAC Honorable Mention | Hannah Plybon, Akron |
| Postseason All-MAC Honorable Mention | Carmen Grande, Ball State |
| All-MAC Defensive Team | Calyn Hosea, Ball State |
| All-MAC Defensive Team | Stephanie Reid, Buffalo |
| All-MAC Defensive Team | Tinara Moore, Central Michigan |
| All-MAC Defensive Team | Jasmine Weatherspoon, Ohio |
| All-MAC Defensive Team | Deja Wimby, Western Michigan |
| All-MAC Freshman Team | Summer Hemphill, Buffalo |
| All-MAC Freshman Team | Lauren Dickerson, Miami |
| All-MAC Freshman Team | Janae Poisson, Northern Illinois |
| All-MAC Freshman Team | Amani Burke, Ohio |
| All-MAC Freshman Team | Mariella Santucci, Toledo |

== See also ==
2016–17 Mid-American Conference men's basketball season
