= 2016–17 South Dakota State Jackrabbits women's basketball team =

Intercollegiate basketball season

2016–17 South Dakota State Jackrabbits women's basketball

Hawkeye Classic Champions

WNIT, Second Round
- Conference: Summit League
- Record: 23–9 (12–4 The Summit)
- Head coach: Aaron Johnston (17th season)
- Assistant coaches: Mike Jewett; Katie Falco; Haylie Linn
- Home arena: Frost Arena

2016–17 Summit League women's basketball standings
	Conf.				Overall
Team	W		L	PCT	W		L	PCT
Western Illinois †	13	–	3	.813	26	–	7	.788
IUPUI	12	–	4	.750	24	–	9	.727
South Dakota State	12	–	4	.750	23	–	9	.719
South Dakota	11	–	5	.688	23	–	9	.719
Omaha	8	–	8	.500	16	–	15	.516
Oral Roberts	7	–	9	.438	15	–	15	.500
North Dakota State	4	–	12	.250	6	–	24	.200
Denver	3	–	13	.188	6	–	24	.200
Fort Wayne	2	–	14	.125	5	–	24	.172
† 2017 Summit League Tournament winner As of March 19, 2017; Rankings from AP Poll

The 2016–17 South Dakota State Jackrabbits women's basketball team represented South Dakota State University in the 2016–17 NCAA Division I women's basketball season. The Jackrabbits, led by seventeenth-year head coach Aaron Johnston. The Jackrabbits competed in the Summit League. They played their home games in Frost Arena, in Brookings, South Dakota.

== Roster ==
2016–17 South Dakota State Jackrabbits women's basketball team
Players
Coaches

Pos.	#	Name	Height	Year	Previous school	Hometown
F	0	Chynna Stevens (I) (redshirt)	6 ft 0 in (1.83 m)	RS Jr	Clark-Willow Lake HS	Clark, SD
G	1	Alexis Alexander	5 ft 7 in (1.7 m)	Jr	Champlin Park HS	Brooklyn Park, MN
G	3	Annabel Graettinger	5 ft 10 in (1.78 m)	RS Fr	Muscatine HS	Muscatine, IA
G/F	10	Kerri Young	6 ft 0 in (1.83 m)	Sr	Mitchell	Mitchell, SD
G	11	Madison Guebert	5 ft 8 in (1.73 m)	So	Eastview	Apple Valley, MN
G	12	Macy Miller (C)	6 ft 0 in (1.83 m)	Jr	Mitchell	Mitchell, SD
G	20	Ena Viso	5 ft 11 in (1.8 m)	Sr	Northeast CC	Copenhagen, Denmark
C	21	Clarissa Ober	6 ft 2 in (1.88 m)	Sr	Glencoe-Silver Lake HS	Glencoe, MN
F	24	Tagyn Larson (I) (redshirt)	6 ft 2 in (1.88 m)	RS Fr	Roosevelt High School (South Dakota)	Sioux Falls, SD
G	32	Sydney Palmer	5 ft 11 in (1.8 m)	So	T. F. Riggs HS	Pierre, SD
G	33	Sydney Tracy	6 ft 0 in (1.83 m)	So	St. Michael-Albertville HS	St. Michael, MN
C	35	Tiffaney Flaata (C)	6 ft 2 in (1.88 m)	Jr	Prior Lake HS	Savage, MN
F	43	Jessica Mieras	6 ft 3 in (1.91 m)	So	O'Gorman HS	Sioux Falls, SD
F	45	Ellie Thompson (C)	6 ft 1 in (1.85 m)	Jr	Chaska HS	Chaska, MN
C	50	Megan Bultsma	6 ft 3 in (1.91 m)	Fr	Mount Vernon/Plankinton HS	Plankinton, SD

Head coach

- Aaron Johnston (Gustavus Adolphus)

Assistant coach(es)

- Mike Jewett (Augustana (SD))
- Katie Falco (Northern Iowa)
- Haylie Linn (Toledo)

Legend

- (C) Team captain
- (S) Suspended
- (I) Ineligible
- (W) Walk-on
- Injured
- Current redshirt

Roster

== Schedule ==
Date time, TV	Rank^{#}	Opponent^{#}	Result	Record	Site (attendance) city, state
Exhibition
10/27/2016*; 7:00 pm		Minnesota–Crookston	W 89–49		Frost Arena (1,336); Brookings, SD
11/03/2016*; 6:00 pm		Dakota Wesleyan	W 78–45		Frost Arena; Brookings, SD
Non-conference regular season
11/11/2016*; 7:00 pm		Creighton	W 61–56	1–0	Frost Arena (2,180); Brookings, SD
11/13/2016*; 2:00 pm		SIU Edwardsville	W 82–49	2–0	Frost Arena (1,261); Brookings, SD
11/19/2016*; 12:45 pm		vs. Montana; Hawkeye Classic semifinals	W 84–43	3–0	Carver–Hawkeye Arena (200); Iowa City, IA
11/20/2016*; 2:00 pm		at Iowa; Hawkeye Classic championship	W 66–64	4–0	Carver–Hawkeye Arena (3,826); Iowa City, IA
11/23/2016*; 7:00 pm, FSOK		at No. 13 Oklahoma	L 60–74	4–1	Lloyd Noble Center (2,453); Norman, OK
12/01/2016*; 7:00 pm, ESPN3		at Northern Iowa	W 61–50	5–1	McLeod Center (529); Cedar Falls, IA
12/03/2016*; 6:00 pm, MidcoSN		Arkansas–Pine Bluff	W 103–45	6–1	Frost Arena (1,455); Brookings, SD
12/06/2016*; 7:00 pm, MidcoSN/ESPN3		at North Dakota	W 83–72	7–1	Betty Engelstad Sioux Center (1,448); Grand Forks, ND
12/09/2016*; 7:00 pm		Green Bay	L 43–67	7–2	Frost Arena (1,898); Brookings, SD
12/11/2016*; 1:00 pm		George Washington	W 60–55	8–2	Frost Arena (1,111); Brookings, SD
12/14/2016*; 6:00 pm, ACCN Extra		at No. 8 Louisville	L 30–83	8–3	KFC Yum! Center (7,408); Louisville, KY
12/18/2016*; 12:00 pm, MidcoSN/ESPN3		Bowling Green	Cancelled		Frost Arena; Brookings, SD
12/21/2016*; 7:00 pm, ESPN3		at Wichita State	W 78–58	9–3	Charles Koch Arena (1,577); Wichita, KS
The Summit League regular season
12/28/2016; 7:00 pm, MidcoSN2/ESPN3		at North Dakota State	W 69–66	10–3 (1–0)	Scheels Arena (1,107); Fargo, ND
12/31/2016; 3:30 pm, MidcoSN/ESPN3		at South Dakota	L 62–65	10–4 (1–1)	Sanford Coyote Sports Center (2,595); Vermillion, SD
01/05/2017; 7:00 pm		Fort Wayne	W 73–51	11–4 (2–1)	Frost Arena (1,276); Brookings, SD
01/07/2017; 2:00 pm, MidcoSN2/ESPN3		Omaha	W 76–64	12–4 (3–1)	Frost Arena (1,782); Brookings, SD
01/11/2017; 7:00 pm		IUPUI	W 68–49	13–4 (4–1)	Frost Arena (1,434); Brookings, SD
01/14/2017; 12:30 pm		Oral Roberts	W 78–57	14–4 (5–1)	Mabee Center (458); Tulsa, OK
01/18/2017; 8:00 pm		Denver	W 72–63	15–4 (6–1)	Magness Arena (266); Denver, CO
01/21/2017; 2:00 pm, MidcoSN2/ESPN3		Western Illinois	W 73-58	16–4 (7–1)	Frost Arena (2,305); Brookings, SD
01/28/2017; 2:00 pm		Omaha	L 82–83	16–5 (7–2)	Baxter Arena (667); Omaha, NE
02/02/2017; 7:00 pm, MidcoSN/ESPN3		North Dakota State	W 70-44	17–5 (8–2)	Frost Arena (1,869); Brookings, SD
02/04/2017; 2:00 pm, MidcoSN/ESPN3		South Dakota	W 70–58	18–5 (9–2)	Frost Arena (3,434); Brookings, SD
02/08/2017; 7:00 pm		Oral Roberts; Pink Game	W 82–35	19–5 (10–2)	Frost Arena (1,642); Brookings, SD
02/11/2017; 2:00 pm		IUPUI	L 59–64	19–6 (10–3)	The Jungle (337); Indianapolis, IN
02/15/2017; 7:00 pm, ESPN3		Western Illinois	L 77–83	19–7 (10–4)	Western Hall (1,303); Macomb, IL
02/18/2017; 3:00 pm		Fort Wayne	W 76–59	20–7 (11–4)	Hilliard Gates Sports Center (633); Fort Wayne, IN
02/23/2017; 7:00 pm		Denver	W 78–54	21–7 (12–4)	Frost Arena (1,572); Brookings, SD
The Summit League Women's Tournament
03/05/2017; 2:30 pm, MidcoSN/ESPN3	(3)	vs. (6) Oral Roberts; Quarterfinals	W 65–50	22–7	Denny Sanford Premier Center; Sioux Falls, SD
03/06/2017; 2:30 pm, MidcoSN/ESPN3	(3)	vs. (2) IUPUI; Semifinals	L 61–65 ^{OT}	22–8	Denny Sanford Premier Center; Sioux Falls, SD
WNIT
03/16/2017*; 7:00 pm, MidcoSN		Northern Illinois; First Round	W 94–84	23–8	Frost Arena (2,610); Brookings, SD
03/19/2017*; 2:00 pm, MidcoSN		Colorado; Second Round	L 75–81 ^{OT}	23–9	Frost Arena (2,793); Brookings, SD
*Non-conference game. ^{#}Rankings from AP Poll. (#) Tournament seedings in parentheses. All times are in Central Time.

== See also ==
- 2016–17 South Dakota State Jackrabbits men's basketball team
