= 2016–17 Toledo Rockets women's basketball team =

Intercollegiate basketball season

2016–17 Toledo Rockets women's basketball

MAC Tournament Champions

NCAA Women's Tournament, first round
- Conference: Mid-American Conference
- West Division
- Record: 25–9 (12–6 MAC)
- Head coach: Tricia Cullop (9th season)
- Assistant coaches: Vicki Hall; Tony Greene; Tiffany Swoffard
- Home arena: Savage Arena

2016–17 Mid-American Conference women's basketball standings
	Conf.				Overall
Team	W		L	PCT	W		L	PCT
East
Kent State	13	–	5	.722	19	–	13	.594
Ohio	12	–	6	.667	22	–	10	.688
Buffalo	10	–	8	.556	22	–	10	.688
Miami (OH)	5	–	13	.278	11	–	21	.344
Bowling Green	4	–	14	.222	8	–	23	.258
Akron	2	–	16	.111	9	–	21	.300
West
Central Michigan	15	–	3	.833	23	–	9	.719
Ball State	14	–	4	.778	21	–	11	.656
Toledo †	12	–	6	.667	25	–	9	.735
Northern Illinois	12	–	6	.667	21	–	12	.636
Western Michigan	8	–	10	.444	19	–	13	.594
Eastern Michigan	1	–	17	.056	6	–	25	.194
† 2017 MAC tournament winner As of March 17, 2017

The 2016–17 Toledo Rockets women's basketball team represented the University of Toledo during the 2016–17 NCAA Division I women's basketball season. The Rockets, led by ninth-year head coach Tricia Cullop, played their home games at Savage Arena, as members of the West Division of the Mid-American Conference. They finished the season 25–9, 12–6 in MAC play to finish in a tie for third place in the West Division. They defeated Kent State, Buffalo and Northern Illinois to win the MAC Tournament and earn an automatic bid to the NCAA women's tournament for the first time since 2001. They lost to Creighton in the first round.

== Roster ==
2016–17 Toledo Rockets women's basketball team
Players
Coaches

Pos.	#	Name	Height	Year	Previous school	Hometown
G	0	Olivia Cunningham	5 ft 7 in (1.7 m)	RS So	Horn Lake; Murray State	Horn Lake, MS
F	1	Sara Rokkanen	5 ft 10 in (1.78 m)	Fr	Mäkelänrinne	Helsinki, Finland
G	2	Mikaela Boyd	5 ft 7 in (1.7 m)	RS So	Proviso West	Hillside, IL
G	3	Mariella Santucci	5 ft 6 in (1.68 m)	Fr	Liceo Scientifico Sabin	Bologna, Italy
G/F	5	Sarah St-Fort	5 ft 10 in (1.78 m)	So	Dawson College	Montreal, Quebec
F	10	Merveilles Tshitenge	5 ft 10 in (1.78 m)	Jr	ESCC; Redlands CC	Neuchâtel, Switzerland
G	11	Jay-Ann Bravo-Harriott (C)	5 ft 10 in (1.78 m)	Jr	Greig City Academy	London, England
F	12	Janice Monakana (C)	6 ft 0 in (1.83 m)	Sr	Greig City Academy	London, England
C	15	Kaayla McIntyre	6 ft 2 in (1.88 m)	So	Notre Dame Academy	Toledo, OH
G	22	Halee Printz	5 ft 11 in (1.8 m)	So	Tippecanoe	Tipp City, OH
F	23	Tanaya Beacham	6 ft 1 in (1.85 m)	Fr	Toledo Rogers	Youngstown, OH
F	24	Michaela Rasmussen	6 ft 1 in (1.85 m)	Jr	Holy Family	Chaska, MN
G/F	35	Jada Woody	6 ft 1 in (1.85 m)	Jr	Plymouth	Canton, MI
C	43	Sophie Reecher	6 ft 3 in (1.91 m)	Sr	Byron	Byron, IL

Head coach

- Tricia Cullop (Purdue)

Assistant coach(es)

- Vicki Hall (Texas)
- Tony Greene (Langston)
- Tiffany Swoffard (Austin Peay)

Legend

- (C) Team captain
- (S) Suspended
- (I) Ineligible
- (W) Walk-on
- Injured
- Current redshirt

Roster

== Schedule ==
Date time, TV	Rank^{#}	Opponent^{#}	Result	Record	Site (attendance) city, state
Exhibition
November 5, 2016*; 12:00 pm		Lock Haven (PA)	W 99–41		Savage Arena; Toledo, OH
Non-conference regular season
November 12, 2016*; 1:00 pm		at Texas A&M–Corpus Christi	W 76–60	1–0	American Bank Center (477); Corpus Christi, TX
November 15, 2016*; 5:30 pm, ESPN3		Rhode Island	W 65–50	2–0	Savage Arena (3,189); Toledo, OH
November 19, 2016*; 12:00 pm		at Cleveland State	W 92–59	3–0	Wolstein Center (197); Cleveland, OH
November 24, 2016*; 4:30 pm		vs. Davidson; Cancún Challenge Riviera Division	W 76–41	4–0	Hard Rock Hotel Riviera Maya (1,610); Cancún, Mexico
November 25, 2016*; 6:30 pm		vs. No. 9 UCLA; Cancún Challenge Riviera Division	L 73–75	4–1	Hard Rock Hotel Riviera Maya (1,610); Cancún, Mexico
December 1, 2016*; 7:00 pm, ESPN3		UIC	W 79–51	5–1	Savage Arena (3,421); Toledo, OH
December 4, 2016*; 2:00 pm, ESPN3		Madonna	W 99–47	6–1	Savage Arena (3,487); Toledo, OH
December 9, 2016*; 11:00 am, SPCSN		at Dayton	W 76–72	7–1	UD Arena (9,007); Dayton, OH
December 11, 2016*; 12:00 pm, ESPN3		St. Bonaventure	W 74–50	8–1	Savage Arena (3,143); Toledo, OH
December 18, 2016*; 2:00 pm, ESPN3		No. 2 Notre Dame	L 68–85	8–2	Savage Arena (5,697); Toledo, OH
December 21, 2016*; 7:00 pm, ESPN3		Detroit	W 72–66	9–2	Savage Arena (3,548); Toledo, OH
MAC regular season
December 31, 2016*; 12:00 pm, ESPN3		Ball State	L 45–51	9–3 (0–1)	Savage Arena (3,509); Toledo, OH
January 4, 2017; 7:00 pm, ESPN3		at Eastern Michigan	W 66–49	10–3 (1–1)	Convocation Center (757); Ypsilanti, MI
January 7, 2017; 12:00 pm, BCSN/SPCSN		Miami (OH)	W 64–50	11–3 (2–1)	Savage Arena (3,381); Toledo, OH
January 11, 2017; 7:00 pm, BCSN/SPCSN		at Buffalo	W 73–64	12–3 (3–1)	Alumni Arena (1,102); Buffalo, NY
January 14, 2017; 2:00 pm, ESPN3		Northern Illinois	L 73–77	12–4 (3–2)	Savage Arena (3,758); Toledo, OH
January 18, 2017; 7:00 pm, ASN/ESPN3		Ohio	L 55–64	12–5 (3–3)	Savage Arena (3,594); Toledo, OH
January 21, 2017; 4:00 pm		at Kent State	L 60–70	12–6 (3–4)	MAC Center (424); Kent, OH
January 28, 2017; 4:30 pm		Central Michigan	W 74–72	13–6 (4–4)	Savage Arena (4,309); Toledo, OH
February 1, 2017; 7:00 pm		Buffalo	W 85–63	14–6 (5–4)	Savage Arena (3,410); Toledo, OH
February 4, 2017; 1:00 pm, ESPN3		at Ohio	L 55–61	14–7 (5–5)	Convocation Center (3,356); Athens, OH
February 8, 2017; 7:00 pm		at Western Michigan	W 72–66	15–7 (6–5)	University Arena (500); Kalamazoo, MI
February 11, 2017; 7:00 pm, ESPN3		Bowling Green	W 74–59	16–7 (7–5)	Savage Arena (4,363); Toledo, OH
February 15, 2017; 7:00 pm, ESPN3		at Akron	W 61–57	17–7 (8–5)	James A. Rhodes Arena (516); Akron, OH
February 18, 2017; 12:00 pm, ASN/ESPN3		at Central Michigan	L 61–72	17–8 (8–6)	McGuirk Arena (1,822); Mount Pleasant, MI
February 22, 2017; 7:00 pm, ESPN3		Eastern Michigan	W 65–57	18–8 (9–6)	Savage Arena (3,372); Toledo, OH
February 25, 2017; 2:00 pm		Western Michigan	W 75–67	19–8 (10–6)	Savage Arena (4,091); Toledo, OH
March 1, 2017; 9:00 pm, ASN/ESPN3		at Northern Illinois	W 79–75	20–8 (11–6)	Convocation Center (763); DeKalb, IL
March 4, 2017; 2:00 pm, ESPN3		at Ball State	W 76–66 ^{OT}	21–8 (12–6)	Worthen Arena (1,785); Muncie, IN
MAC Women's Tournament
March 6, 2017; 5:30 pm, ESPN3	(6)	(11) Akron; First Round	W 65–37	22–8	Savage Arena (3,627); Toledo, OH
March 8, 2017; 7:30 pm, BCSN/ESPN3	(6)	vs. (3) Kent State; Quarterfinals	W 66–63	23–8	Quicken Loans Arena (3,433); Cleveland, OH
March 10, 2017; 1:30 pm, BCSN/ESPN3	(6)	vs. (7) Buffalo; Semifinals	W 72–65	24–8	Quicken Loans Arena (1,277); Cleveland, OH
March 11, 2017; 11:00 am, CBSSN	(6)	vs. (4) Northern Illinois; Championship Game	W 82–71	25–8	Quicken Loans Arena (1,589); Cleveland, OH
NCAA Women's Tournament
March 17, 2017*; 7:30 pm, ESPN2	(10 S)	vs. (7 S) Creighton; First Round	L 49–76	25–9	Gill Coliseum (4,692); Corvallis, OR
*Non-conference game. ^{#}Rankings from AP Poll. (#) Tournament seedings in parentheses. S=Stockton Region. All times are in Eastern Time.

== See also ==
- 2016–17 Toledo Rockets men's basketball team
