= Stroh Center =

Multi-purpose arena in Bowling Green, Ohio

- The Nest
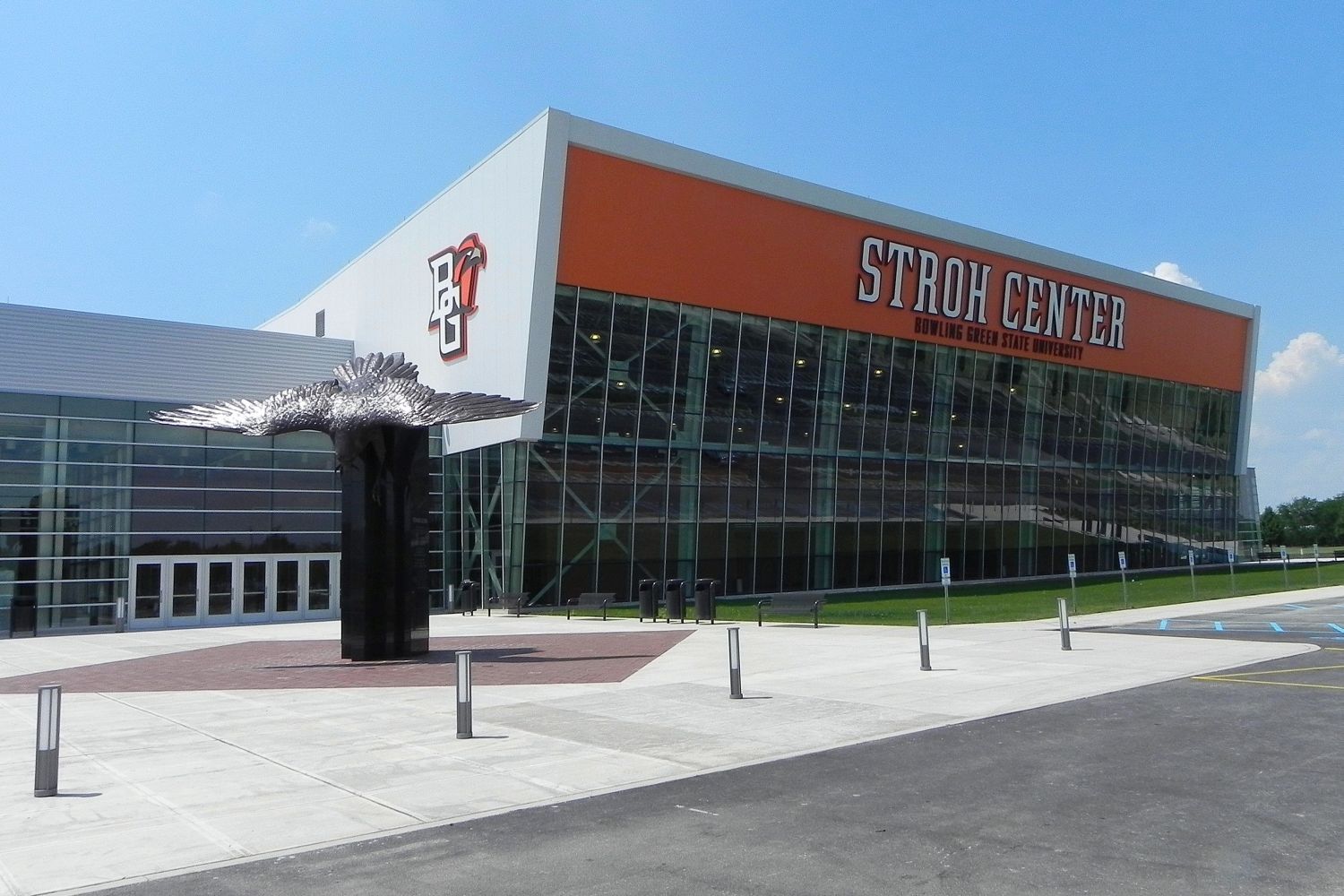
- Exterior view in 2011
- Interactive map of Stroh Center
- Location: 1535 East Wooster Street; Bowling Green, Ohio, 43402; United States
- Coordinates: 41.375343°N 83.624711°W
- Owner: Bowling Green State University
- Operator: Global Spectrum
- Capacity: 4,387 (basketball); 5,209 (convocation)
- Surface: Multi-surface

Construction
- Groundbreaking: September 3, 2009
- Opened: September 9, 2011
- Cost: $30 million ($42.9 million in 2025 dollars)
- Architect: Rossetti Architects
- Project manager: Gilbane Building Company
- Services engineer: URS Group Inc.
- General contractor: Mosser Construction

Tenants
- Bowling Green Falcons (NCAA); Men's basketball (2011–present); Women's basketball (2011–present); Women's volleyball (2011–present)

The Stroh Center is a multi-purpose arena on the campus of Bowling Green State University in Bowling Green, Ohio, United States. It replaced Anderson Arena as the home of the Bowling Green Falcons men's and women's basketball and women's volleyball teams, and hosts music concerts and the university's commencement ceremonies. The arena was designed by the architectural firm Rossetti Architects, designers of Red Bull Arena and Rio Tinto Stadium, and engineering firm URS Group Inc. The building opened in September 2011 and seats 4,387 people for basketball and volleyball games and 5,209 for convocation events and concerts.

== History ==
After almost five decades of service to Bowling Green State University, it became apparent that Anderson Arena was at the end of its useful life due to its limited accommodations. There were only two restrooms in the entire arena and poor acoustics for concerts, and it also lacked air conditioning. The most glaring factor that demanded replacement of Anderson Arena was that it was severely out of compliance with the Americans with Disabilities Act. All of these proved detrimental to the university's image and recruiting abilities.

=== Fundraising ===
At the men's basketball 2008 home finale against rival Kent State, Kermit Stroh, a trustee of the university from 1993 to 2002, and his late wife Mary Lu donated a university record $8.7 million to the university towards interscholastic athletics with $7.7 million marked for the building of a new convocation center that was to replace Anderson Arena.

After a fundraiser that netted $13.5 million, including the $7.7 million from the Strohs, Bowling Green earmarked $36 million to fund the construction of the new arena, which included a $60 student fee every semester once the building was opened until the loans for the construction of the arena were paid off. As plans for the arena accelerated despite the university's poor financial situation, several students formed a coalition to have a student vote on the Undergraduate Student Government's resolution that the student body supported paying the extra fee, leaving the passage of the resolution to the students in a vote. The subsequent vote was held online in late March 2009, 28% of the student population participated in the vote and approved of the future fee with 2,630 students in favor, while 1,182 were opposed.

=== Construction ===
Seven sites around the campus were under consideration for the construction of the Stroh Center, including the adjacent parking lot next to Memorial Hall, which houses Anderson Arena and the intramural fields between Doyt Perry Stadium and the Kreischer residence halls. The university ultimately decided to build the arena on a large parking lot along Wooster Street and Mercer Road at the east end of the campus that served as one of two parking lots for students that resided in the dormitories on campus. Ground was broken on September 3, 2009, as Kerm Stroh dug a patch of ground with a backhoe at a ceremony attended by around 450 spectators and media. The first steel beam was installed at the Stroh Center site on January 25, 2010 and the site's topping off occurred during a ceremony on May 3, 2010.

=== Falcon Statue ===
In July 2008, the university announced that a 2-ton, 23-foot (7.0 m) falcon statue would be installed at the entrance of the new arena. The statue was a gift from North Carolina philanthropist, Irwin Belk, and cost $100,000. The statue was designed by the Jon Hair Studio of Fine Art near Cornelius, North Carolina and will be the largest bronze falcon statue in the world. The falcon statue was installed in November 2010 and became part of the Falcon Spirit Plaza at the front entrance of the Stroh Center.

== Design and amenities ==
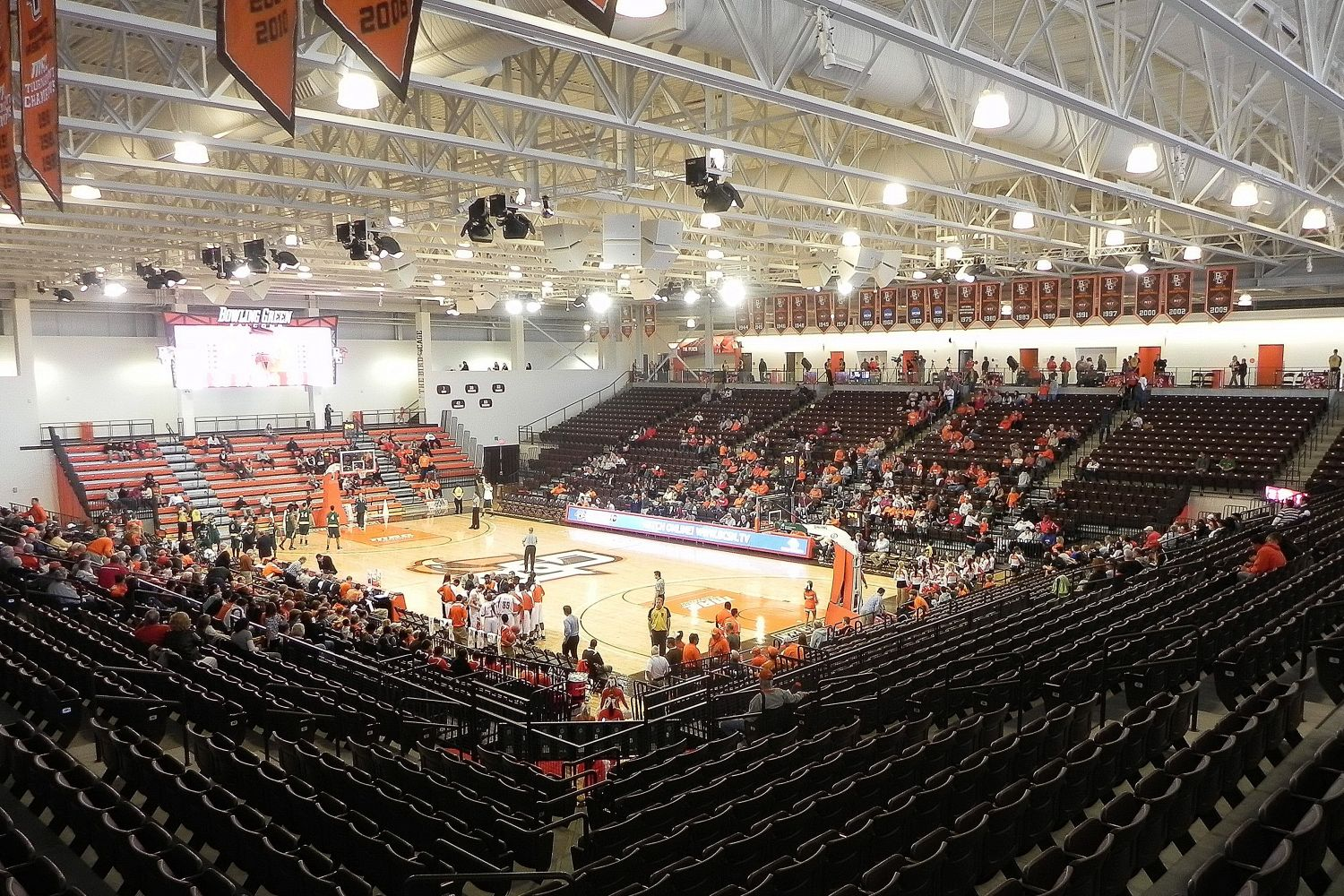
Interior of the Stroh Center prior to an exhibition game against Tiffin on November 5, 2011.

The Stroh Center was designed by Rossetti Architects of Southfield, Michigan and the Cleveland office of the URS Group Inc. engineering firm. A major goal of the construction was to replicate the intimacy of Anderson Arena, while providing athletes and spectators with the modern comforts of a state-of-the-art convocation center. To accommodate this the Stroh Center was built in a theatre-in-the-round design, providing an open walkway allowing spectators to walk completely around the facility without missing the event on the stadium floor. The arena also includes 88 courtside seats, and the furthest seat in the arena, 60 feet (18 m) from the court, is only 5 feet (1.5 m) further from the furthest seat at Anderson Arena. The seat widths at the Stroh Center range from 19 to 22 inches, while the largest seat at Anderson was only 18 inches. The arena also has four restrooms each at the north and south ends of the arena, two for women, one for men, and one for families, and provides four concession areas in the open walkways.

=== Schmidthorst Pavilion ===
An auxiliary gym at the Stroh Center, called the Schmidthorst Pavilion, was paid for with a $1.7 million donation from Allen and Carol Schmidthorst, while the court for the gym was paid for with a $1 million donation from Bowling Green alumnus Larry Miles. The auxiliary practice gym built with the combined $2.7 million helps the men's and women's basketball teams avoid scheduling conflicts with the arena, an amenity that was not available at the Anderson Arena. The arena also includes four visiting team locker rooms that can accommodate multiple teams that allow it to support events such as high school basketball tournaments.

=== Video Board ===
The main video board at the Stroh Center is 10 feet (3.0 m) high by 20 feet (6.1 m) wide with fixed sponsor elements and decorative cladding developed by Capturion Network LLC. The scoreboard hangs above the west basket and can operate as one large screen or be divided into multiple sections which have the ability to display real-time statistics, sponsor graphics, 3D animations and HD live or recorded video. Along with the scoreboard, Capturion manufactured the scorer's tables and press row, which also feature the company's latest technology. There also is a 3-by-30-foot (0.91 by 9.14 m) "ribbon board" on the east end of the court with a variety of other scoreboards.

=== Schmidthorst Heritage Hall ===
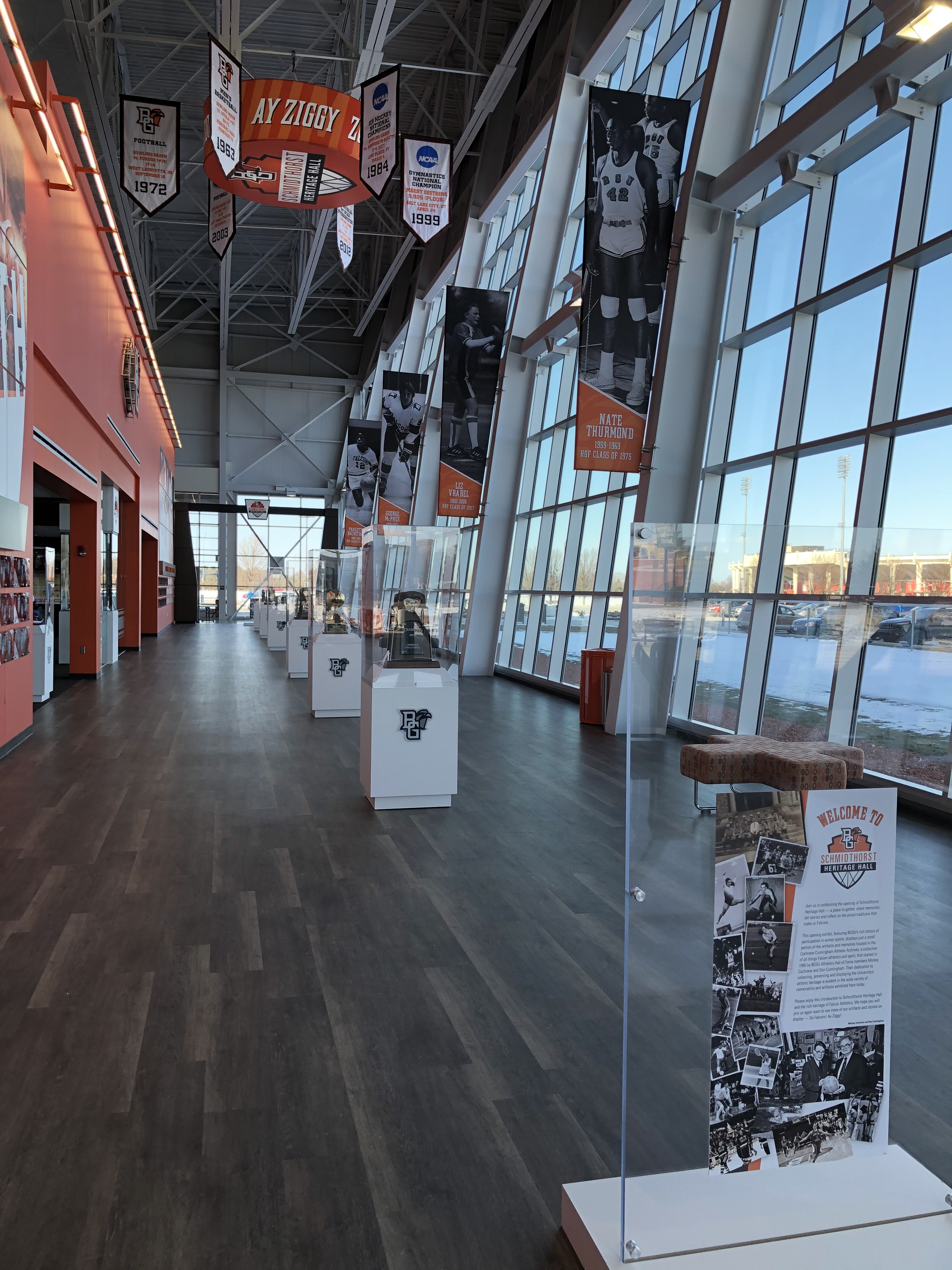
The Schmidthorst Heritage Hall

The Stroh Center also holds a prominently placed Hall of Fame to commemorate the history of athletics at Bowling Green State University that includes exhibits and display cases that hold items on a rotating basis. There is also a designated area within the arena for cataloging and storing items not currently on display. Before the facilities at the Stroh Center, almost all memorabilia and artifacts related to Bowling Green athletics since the university's opening in 1910 had been stored in boxes in a small room just off the lobby of Anderson Arena in Memorial Hall and voluntarily collected and stored by former Bowling Green men's soccer and lacrosse coach Mickey Cochrane, who is namesake for the Mickey Cochrane Stadium which serves as the home of the Bowling Green Falcons men's and women's soccer teams.

On February 8, 2020, the Hall of Fame was dedicated as the Schmidthorst Heritage Hall following renovations, adding items from the Cochrane Cunningham Archives to the hall.

=== Anderson Club ===
Harold Anderson, former Bowling Green men's basketball coach and athletic director and namesake for the Stroh Center's predecessor, Anderson Arena, is remembered with the Anderson Club. The Anderson Club consists of an approximately 1,500-square-foot (140 m^{2}) club area and chair back seating for roughly 400 fans. It includes hospitality areas, food and beverage service, high-definition televisions and areas to view the games. The Anderson Club area is located on the concourse level on the south side of the arena at mid-court and seating for fans extends to the floor-level row.

== Notable events ==
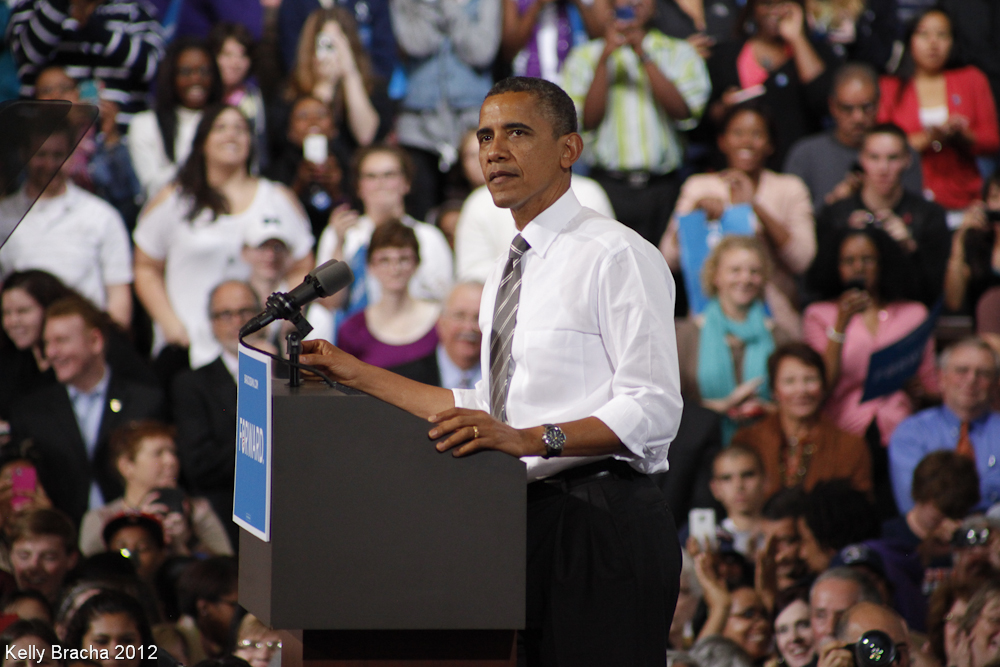
President Obama speaking at the Stroh Center.

The Stroh Center held its first ticketed event, a concert by Christian rock band Sanctus Real, on August 13, 2011. The first Bowling Green athletic event at the new arena was a women's volleyball match between Bowling Green and Michigan State on September 9. The Bowling Green Falcons defeated the Spartans in four games, 3–1 with the attendance of 2,961 people. The men's basketball team played their first game at the Stroh Center on November 11, a 63–48 win over Howard in front of 3,476 fans. The women's team played their home opener against Purdue six days later, falling to the 20th-ranked Boilermakers 54–53 with 1,932 in attendance.

The Stroh Center Stadium hosted a regular season game between the Bowling Green men's basketball team and the nationally prominent Michigan State men's basketball team during the 2012–13 men's basketball season and hosting first and second-round games of the 2012 NCAA Women's Division I Basketball Tournament.

In September 2012, President Barack Obama gave a speech at the Stroh Center during his re-election campaign.

Throughout the early years of its existence, the Stroh Center has held concerts with various artists. The most notable have been Chris Young, Florida Georgia Line, Kenny Rogers, and Cleveland-based rapper Machine Gun Kelly. Later performances included B.o.B., Nick Jonas, Kesha, Hunter Hayes, and Kip Moore.

The Hatch, an annual entrepreneurship competition inspired by Shark Tank and organized by the College of Business Administration moved from the Student Union to the Stroh Center in 2015.

The Stroh Center also hosts the Falcon BEST Robotics competition annually in the fall.

== See also ==
- List of NCAA Division I basketball arenas
