= 2017–18 Tulane Green Wave women's basketball team =

Intercollegiate basketball season

2017–18 Tulane Green Wave women's basketball
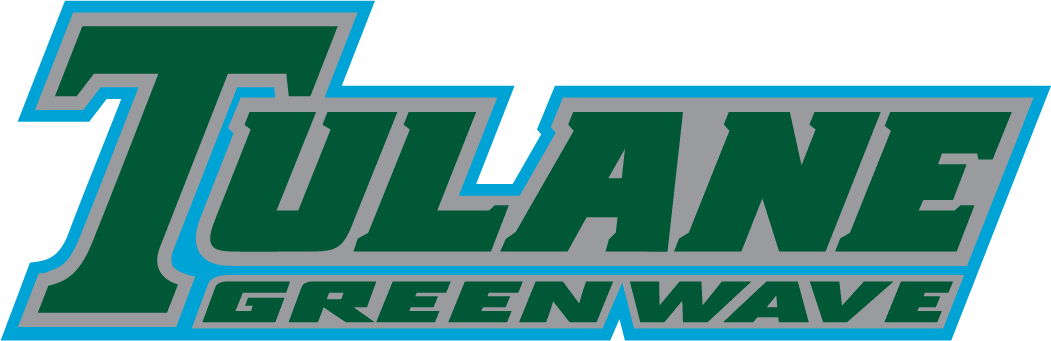

Tulane Classic Champions
- Conference: American Athletic Conference
- Record: 14–17 (5–11 The American)
- Head coach: Lisa Stockton (24th season)
- Assistant coaches: Alan Frey; Doshia Woods; Beth Dunkenberger
- Home arena: Devlin Fieldhouse

2017–18 American Athletic Conference women's basketball standings
	Conf.				Overall
Team	W		L	PCT	W		L	PCT
No. 1 UConn †	16	–	0	1.000	36	–	1	.973
No. 19 South Florida	13	–	3	.813	26	–	8	.765
UCF	12	–	4	.750	22	–	11	.667
Cincinnati	10	–	6	.625	19	–	13	.594
Houston	9	–	7	.563	20	–	12	.625
Wichita State	9	–	7	.563	14	–	17	.452
East Carolina	7	–	9	.438	16	–	15	.516
Tulane	5	–	11	.313	14	–	17	.452
Memphis	5	–	11	.313	10	–	20	.333
SMU	4	–	12	.250	10	–	20	.333
Temple	3	–	13	.188	12	–	19	.387
Tulsa	3	–	13	.188	10	–	21	.323
† 2018 American Tournament winner As of 30 March 2018; Rankings from AP poll

The 2017–18 Tulane Green Wave women's basketball team represented Tulane University during the 2017–18 NCAA Division I women's basketball season. The Green Wave, led by twenty-fourth year head coach Lisa Stockton, played their home games at Devlin Fieldhouse and were fourth year members of the American Athletic Conference. They finished the season 14–17, 5–1 in AAC play to finish in a for eighth place. They defeat Memphis in the first round before losing in the quarterfinals of the American Athletic women's tournament to Connecticut.

== Media ==
All Green Wave games are broadcast on WRBH 88.3 FM. A video stream for all home games is on Tulane All-Access, ESPN3, or AAC Digital. Road games are typically streamed on the opponents website, though conference road games could also appear on ESPN3 or AAC Digital.

== Roster ==
2017–18 Tulane Green Wave women's basketball team
Players
Coaches

Pos.	#	Name	Height	Year	Previous school	Hometown
G	1	Kaila Anderson	5 ft 5 in (1.65 m)	Fr	University Lab	Kenner, LA
G	3	Kolby Morgan	5 ft 8 in (1.73 m)	Sr	John Curtis Christian	Hammond, LA
G	5	Kayla Manuirirangi	5 ft 8 in (1.73 m)	So	New Plymouth Girls'	Hawera, New Zealand
G	11	Tatyana Lofton	5 ft 9 in (1.75 m)	Jr	Madison-Ridgeland Academy	Madison, MS
G	12	Sierra Cheatham	6 ft 0 in (1.83 m)	Fr	Clear Springs	Houston, TX
G	13	Caylah Cruickshank	5 ft 9 in (1.75 m)	Sr	Dawson College	Montreal, QE
G	15	Tene Thompson	5 ft 11 in (1.8 m)	Jr	Hillgrove	Powder Springs, GA
G	22	Meredith Schulte	6 ft 0 in (1.83 m)	Jr	Mill Creek	Brasleton, GA
F	23	Krystal Freeman	6 ft 0 in (1.83 m)	Fr	Pineville	Pineville, LA
F	24	Maddison Wells	6 ft 1 in (1.85 m)	So	Chain of Lakes Collegiate	Winter Haven, FL
F	25	Harlyn Wyatt	6 ft 2 in (1.88 m)	Jr	Benjamin E. Mays	Atlanta, GA
C	34	Ksenija Madzarevic	6 ft 5 in (1.96 m)	Jr	Rabun Gap Nacoochee	Novi Sad, Serbia

Head coach

- Lisa Stockton (Wake Forest)

Assistant coach(es)

- Alan Frey (New Orleans)
- Doshia Woods (Western Illinois)
- Beth Dunkenberger (Randolph–Macon)

Legend

- (C) Team captain
- (S) Suspended
- (I) Ineligible
- (W) Walk-on
- Injured
- Current redshirt

Roster
Last update: October 31, 2017

== Schedule and results ==
Date time, TV	Rank^{#}	Opponent^{#}	Result	Record	Site (attendance) city, state
Exhibition
11/02/2017*; 5:00 pm		Loyola (New Orleans)	W 78–48		Devlin Fieldhouse; New Orleans, LA
11/05/2017*; 6:00 pm		South Alabama	W 65–51		Devlin Fieldhouse (465); New Orleans, LA
Non-conference regular season
11/10/2017*; 5:00 pm, ESPN3		at Maine; Maine Tip-Off Tournament semifinals	W 42–34	1–0	The Pit (1,054); Orono, ME
11/11/2017*; 1:00 pm, ESPN3		vs. Dayton; Maine Tip-Off Tournament championship	L 65–71	1–1	The Pit (303); Orono, ME
11/14/2017*; 6:00 pm		at Southern Miss	L 58–66	1–2	Reed Green Coliseum (1,126); Hattiesburg, MS
11/17/2017*; 12:00 pm		Vanderbilt	W 71–59	2–2	Devlin Fieldhouse (1,562); New Orleans, LA
11/24/2017*; 2:00 pm		vs. Iowa State; Junkanoo Jam Bimini Division semifinals	L 64–67	2–3	Gateway Christian Academy; Bimini, Bahamas
11/25/2017*; 3:15 pm		vs. San Diego State; Junkanoo Jam Bimini Division 3rd place game	W 80–46	3–3	Gateway Christian Academy; Bimini, Bahamas
11/29/2017*; 7:00 pm		at McNeese State	W 70–66	4–3	Burton Coliseum (729); Lake Charles, LA
12/03/2017*; 1:00 pm, ACCN Extra		at NC State	L 55–79	4–4	Reynolds Coliseum (2,088); Raleigh, NC
12/05/2017*; 7:00 pm, CST		New Orleans	W 79–56	5–4	Devlin Fieldhouse (935); New Orleans, LA
12/10/2017*; 2:00 pm, CST		LSU	L 50–73	5–5	Devlin Fieldhouse (1,242); New Orleans, LA
12/17/2017*; 2:00 pm		Middle Tennessee	W 62–44	6–5	Devlin Fieldhouse (545); New Orleans, LA
12/21/2017*; 2:30 pm		Troy; Tulane Classic semifinals	W 106–75	7–5	Devlin Fieldhouse; New Orleans, LA
12/22/2017*; 3:00 pm		UTEP; Tulane Classic championship	W 67–56	8–5	Devlin Fieldhouse (706); New Orleans, LA
AAC regular season
12/31/2017; 11:00 am, ESPNU		at No. 25 South Florida	L 46–75	8–6 (0–1)	USF Sun Dome (2,018); Tampa, FL
01/03/2018; 11:00 am		at Tulsa	W 72–63	9–6 (1–1)	Reynolds Center (202); Tulsa, OK
01/06/2018; 2:00 pm		Houston	L 92–98 ^{OT}	9–7 (1–2)	Devlin Fieldhouse (642); New Orleans, LA
01/13/2018; 2:30 pm		Wichita State	L 56–64	9–8 (1–3)	Devlin Fieldhouse (604); New Orleans, LA
01/17/2018; 6:00 pm, ADN		at UCF	L 51–59	9–9 (1–4)	CFE Arena (3,107); Orlando, FL
01/21/2018; 1:00 pm, ESPNU		Tulsa	W 70–39	10–9 (2–4)	Devlin Fieldhouse (710); New Orleans, LA
01/24/2018; 7:00 pm, ESPN3		East Carolina	W 64–58	11–9 (3–4)	Devlin Fieldhouse (585); New Orleans, LA
01/27/2018; 11:00 am, SNY/ESPN3		at No. 1 Connecticut	L 45–98	11–10 (3–5)	Harry A. Gampel Pavilion; Storrs, CT
01/31/2018; 7:00 pm		at Houston	L 48–72	11–11 (3–6)	H&PE Arena (575); Houston, TX
02/03/2018; 1:00 pm, ESPN3		South Florida	L 53–63	11–12 (3–7)	Devlin Fieldhouse (775); New Orleans, LA
02/07/2018; 7:00 pm, ESPN3		Temple	W 69–65	12–12 (4–7)	Devlin Fieldhouse (625); New Orleans, LA
02/10/2018; 1:00 pm		at Cincinnati	L 52–83	12–13 (4–8)	Saint Ursula Academy Gym (463); Cincinnati, OH
02/18/2018; 2:00 pm, ESPN2		at Memphis	L 60–73	12–14 (4–9)	Elma Roane Fieldhouse (467); Memphis, TN
02/21/2018; 7:00 pm, SNY/ESPN3		No. 1 Connecticut	L 47–91	12–15 (4–10)	Devlin Fieldhouse (1,655); New Orleans, LA
02/24/2018; 2:00 pm		at Wichita State	L 70–81	12–16 (4–11)	Charles Koch Arena (2,818); Wichita, KS
02/26/2018; 7:00 pm, ESPN3		SMU	W 52–46	13–16 (5–11)	Devlin Fieldhouse (845); New Orleans, LA
AAC Women's Tournament
03/03/2018; 5:00 pm, ESPN3	(9)	vs. (8) Memphis; First Round	W 76–64	14–16	Mohegan Sun Arena (4,599); Uncasville, CT
03/04/2018; 5:30 pm, ESPNU	(9)	vs. (1) No. 1 Connecticut; Quarterfinals	L 56–82	14–17	Mohegan Sun Arena (6,804); Uncasville, CT
*Non-conference game. ^{#}Rankings from AP Poll. (#) Tournament seedings in parentheses. All times are in Central Time.

== Rankings ==
Regular season polls
Poll	Pre- Season	Week 2	Week 3	Week 4	Week 5	Week 6	Week 7	Week 8	Week 9	Week 10	Week 11	Week 12	Week 13	Week 14	Week 15	Week 16	Week 17	Week 18	Week 19	Final
AP																				
Coaches																				

Legend
	Increase in ranking
	Decrease in ranking
	Not ranked previous week
(RV)	Received Votes

== See also ==
- 2017–18 Tulane Green Wave men's basketball team
