= 2017–18 UCF Knights women's basketball team =

Intercollegiate basketball season

2017–18 UCF Knights women's basketball

WNIT, Second Round
- Conference: American Athletic Conference
- Record: 22–11 (12–4 The American)
- Head coach: Katie Abrahamson-Henderson (2nd season)
- Assistant coaches: Tahnee Balerio; Isoken Uzamere; Nykesha Sales
- Home arena: CFE Arena

2017–18 American Athletic Conference women's basketball standings
	Conf.				Overall
Team	W		L	PCT	W		L	PCT
No. 1 UConn †	16	–	0	1.000	36	–	1	.973
No. 19 South Florida	13	–	3	.813	26	–	8	.765
UCF	12	–	4	.750	22	–	11	.667
Cincinnati	10	–	6	.625	19	–	13	.594
Houston	9	–	7	.563	20	–	12	.625
Wichita State	9	–	7	.563	14	–	17	.452
East Carolina	7	–	9	.438	16	–	15	.516
Tulane	5	–	11	.313	14	–	17	.452
Memphis	5	–	11	.313	10	–	20	.333
SMU	4	–	12	.250	10	–	20	.333
Temple	3	–	13	.188	12	–	19	.387
Tulsa	3	–	13	.188	10	–	21	.323
† 2018 American Tournament winner As of 30 March 2018; Rankings from AP poll

The 2017–18 UCF Knights women's basketball team represented the University of Central Florida during the 2017–18 NCAA Division I basketball season. The Knights competed in Division I of the National Collegiate Athletic Association (NCAA) and the American Athletic Conference (The American). The Knights, in the program's 41st season of basketball, were led by second-year head coach Katie Abrahamson-Henderson, and played their home games at the CFE Arena on the university's main campus in Orlando, Florida. They finished the season 22–11, 12–4 in AAC play to finish in third place. They advanced to the semifinals of the American Athletic women's tournament, where they lost to South Florida. They received an automatic bid to the Women's National Invitational Tournament, where they defeated Jacksonville in the first round before losing to Alabama in the second round.

== Media ==
All UCF games had an audio or video broadcast available. For conference play, UCF games were typically available on ESPN3, AAC Digital, or UCF Knights All-Access. Road games not on ESPN3 or AAC Digital had an audio broadcast available on the UCF portal. All non-conference home games were streamed exclusively on UCF Knights All-Access. Select non-conference road games had a stream available through the opponent's website. The audio broadcast for home games was only available through UCF Knights All-Access.

== Roster ==
2017–18 UCF Knights women's basketball team
Players
Coaches

Pos.	#	Name	Height	Year	Previous school	Hometown
G	0	Sianni Martin (redshirt)	5 ft 8 in (1.73 m)	Jr	Neumann Goretti HS; Towson	Philadelphia, PA
G	1	Anna Kelly (redshirt)	5 ft 6 in (1.68 m)	So	Lexington HS; Fordham	Lexington, MA
G	2	Korneila Wright	5 ft 7 in (1.7 m)	So	Jones HS	Orlando, FL
G	3	Zakiya Saunders	5 ft 9 in (1.75 m)	RS Sr	Carthage Central HS; Albany	Augusta, GA
F	4	Masseny Kaba	6 ft 3 in (1.91 m)	Fr	Cathedral HS	Dorchester, MA
G	11	Kayla Thingpen	5 ft 8 in (1.73 m)	Jr	Palm Beach Lakes HS	West Palm Beach, FL
F	12	Nyala Shuler	6 ft 0 in (1.83 m)	RS Jr	Edgewater HS	Orlando, FL
G	21	Sydnee McDonald	5 ft 11 in (1.8 m)	Jr	Flint Carman-Ainsworth HS; Chipola College	Flint, MI
G	22	Aliyah Gregory	5 ft 10 in (1.78 m)	Sr	Strawberry Crest	Tampa, FL
G	23	Lawriell Wilson	5 ft 8 in (1.73 m)	Jr	Warren Easton Charter; Tallahassee CC	Kenner, LA
F	24	Fifi Ndour	6 ft 1 in (1.85 m)	Sr	Montverde Academy	Dakar, Senegal
F	25	Tolulope Omokore	5 ft 11 in (1.8 m)	Jr	Eleanor Roosevelt HS	Greenbelt, MD
G	30	Delphine Robitaille	5 ft 10 in (1.78 m)	Fr	Cégep Édouard-Montpetit	Montreal, QC
G	33	Jamesha Paul	5 ft 8 in (1.73 m)	Jr	Dillard HS	Pompano Beach, FL
F	34	Ruona Uwusiaba	6 ft 3 in (1.91 m)	Fr	Southwest Dekalb	Zaiaro Otor-Owhe, Nigeria

Head coach

- Katie Abrahamson-Henderson (Iowa)

Assistant coach(es)

- Tahnee Balerio (Missouri State)
- Isoken Uzamere (Hofstra)
- Nykesha Sales (Connecticut)

Legend

- (C) Team captain
- (S) Suspended
- (I) Ineligible
- (W) Walk-on
- Injured
- Current redshirt

Roster
Last update: October 31, 2017

== Schedule and results ==
Date time, TV	Rank^{#}	Opponent^{#}	Result	Record	Site (attendance) city, state
Non-conference regular season
11/10/2017*; 5:30 pm		Mercer	L 64–73	0–1	CFE Arena (3,574); Orlando, FL
11/13/2017*; 6:30 pm		at Chattanooga	W 58–57	1–1	McKenzie Arena (1,534); Chattanooga, TN
11/17/2017*; 7:00 pm		at Gardner-Webb	W 65–30	2–1	Paul Porter Arena (842); Boiling Springs, NC
11/19/2017*; 6:30 pm, ACCN Extra		at Virginia Tech	L 69–86	2–2	Cassell Coliseum (2,166); Blacksburg, VA
11/22/2017*; 2:00 pm		Elon	L 57–71	2–3	CFE Arena (2,332); Orlando, FL
11/25/2017*; 2:30 pm		IUPUI; UCF Thanksgiving Classic	W 63–59	3–3	CFE Arena (2,807); Orlando, FL
11/26/2017*; 1:30 pm		Northern Iowa; UCF Thanksgiving Classic	W 53–43	4–3	CFE Arena (2,755); Orlando, FL
11/30/2017*; 7:00 pm		at Samford	L 51–58	4–4	Pete Hanna Center (207); Birmingham, AL
12/10/2017*; 2:00 pm		Georgia Southern	W 62–38	5–4	CFE Arena (2,868); Orlando, FL
12/13/2017*; 7:00 pm		at Boston University	W 47–32	6–4	Case Gym (301); Boston, MA
12/17/2017*; 7:00 pm		at UC Davis	W 62–55	7–4	The Pavilion (710); Davis, CA
12/20/2017*; 8:00 pm		at Pacific	L 74–78 ^{OT}	7–5	Alex G. Spanos Center (238); Stockton, CA
12/28/2017*; 2:00 pm		Davidson	W 62–54	8–5	CFE Arena (3,035); Orlando, FL
AAC regular season
12/30/2017; 2:00 pm		Temple	W 76–46	9–5 (1–0)	CFE Arena (2,789); Orlando, FL
01/03/2018; 8:00 pm		at SMU	W 60–42	10–5 (2–0)	Moody Coliseum (850); Dallas, TX
01/06/2018; 2:00 pm, ADN		Wichita State	W 59–53	11–5 (3–0)	CFE Arena (3,385); Orlando, FL
01/09/2018; 7:00 pm, SNY/ESPN3		at No. 1 Connecticut	L 44–80	11–6 (3–1)	Harry A. Gampel Pavilion (5,482); Storrs, CT
01/14/2018; 12:00 pm, ESPNU		at South Florida; Rivalry	L 45–62	11–7 (3–2)	USF Sun Dome (2,370); Tampa, FL
01/17/2018; 7:00 pm, ADN		Tulane	W 59–51	12–7 (4–2)	CFE Arena (3,107); Orlando, FL
01/20/2018; 2:00 pm, ADN		SMU	W 58–43	13–7 (5–2)	CFE Arena (3,176); Orlando, FL
01/27/2018; 2:00 pm, ADN		at Tulsa	W 47–44	14–7 (6–2)	Reynolds Center (317); Tulsa, OK
01/30/2018; 7:00 pm		at Cincinnati	W 50–38	15–7 (7–2)	St. Ursula Academy Gymnasium (353); Cincinnati, OH
02/03/2018; 2:00 pm		Memphis	W 61–41	16–7 (8–2)	CFE Arena (3,388); Orlando, FL
02/07/2018; 7:00 pm, SNY/ESPN3		No. 1 Connecticut	L 37–55	16–8 (8–3)	CFE Arena (6,155); Orlando, FL
02/10/2018; 2:00 pm, ADN		at Temple	W 64–57	17–8 (9–3)	McGonigle Hall (1,211); Philadelphia, PA
02/18/2018; 12:00 pm, CBSSN		No. 22 South Florida; Rivalry	L 68–77 ^{OT}	17–9 (9–4)	CFE Arena (3,550); Orlando, FL
02/21/2018; 8:00 pm, ADN		at Memphis	W 63–40	18–9 (10–4)	Elma Roane Fieldhouse (391); Memphis, TN
02/24/2018; 1:00 pm, ADN		at Houston	W 64–59	19–9 (11–4)	H&PE Arena (1,099); Houston, TX
02/26/2018; 7:00 pm		East Carolina	W 75–54	20–9 (12–4)	CFE Arena (3,339); Orlando, FL
AAC Women's Tournament
03/04/2018; 12:00 pm, ESPN3	(3)	vs. (11) Temple; Quarterfinals	W 77–70	21–9	Mohegan Sun Arena (3,392); Uncasville, CT
03/05/2018; 4:30 pm, ESPNU	(3)	vs. (2) No. 19 South Florida; Semifinals	L 59–74	21–10	Mohegan Sun Arena (6,033); Uncasville, CT
WNIT
03/14/2018*; 6:00 pm		Jacksonville; First Round	W 65–60 ^{OT}	22–10	CFE Arena (493); Orlando, FL
03/18/2018*; 3:00 pm		at Alabama; Second Round	L 61–80	22–11	Coleman Coliseum (321); Tuscaloosa, AL
*Non-conference game. ^{#}Rankings from AP Poll. (#) Tournament seedings in parentheses. All times are in Eastern Time.

== Rankings ==
Regular season polls
Poll	Pre- season	Week 2	Week 3	Week 4	Week 5	Week 6	Week 7	Week 8	Week 9	Week 10	Week 11	Week 12	Week 13	Week 14	Week 15	Week 16	Week 17	Week 18	Week 19	Final
AP																				N/A
Coaches																RV			RV	

Legend
	Increase in ranking
	Decrease in ranking
	Not ranked previous week
(RV)	Received votes

== See also ==
- 2017–18 UCF Knights men's basketball team
