= 2017–18 SMU Mustangs women's basketball team =

Intercollegiate basketball season

2017–18 SMU Mustangs women's basketball
- Conference: American Athletic Conference
- Record: 10–20 (4–12 The American)
- Head coach: Travis Mays (2nd season)
- Assistant coaches: Mike Brandt; Erica White; Amie Smith Bradley
- Home arena: Moody Coliseum

2017–18 American Athletic Conference women's basketball standings
	Conf.				Overall
Team	W		L	PCT	W		L	PCT
No. 1 UConn †	16	–	0	1.000	36	–	1	.973
No. 19 South Florida	13	–	3	.813	26	–	8	.765
UCF	12	–	4	.750	22	–	11	.667
Cincinnati	10	–	6	.625	19	–	13	.594
Houston	9	–	7	.563	20	–	12	.625
Wichita State	9	–	7	.563	14	–	17	.452
East Carolina	7	–	9	.438	16	–	15	.516
Tulane	5	–	11	.313	14	–	17	.452
Memphis	5	–	11	.313	10	–	20	.333
SMU	4	–	12	.250	10	–	20	.333
Temple	3	–	13	.188	12	–	19	.387
Tulsa	3	–	13	.188	10	–	21	.323
† 2018 American Tournament winner As of 30 March 2018; Rankings from AP poll

The 2017–18 SMU Mustangs women's basketball team represented Southern Methodist University in the 2017–18 NCAA Division I women's basketball season. The Mustangs, led by second year head coach Travis Mays, played their home games at Moody Coliseum and were fifth year members of the American Athletic Conference. They finished the season 10–20, 4–12 in AAC play to finish in tenth place. They lost in the first round of the American Athletic women's tournament to East Carolina.

== Media ==
All Pony Express games will air on KAAM. Before conference season home games will be streamed on Pony Up TV. Conference home games will rotate between ESPN3, AAC Digital, and Pony Up TV. Road games will typically be streamed on the opponents website, though conference road games could also appear on ESPN3 or AAC Digital.

== Roster ==
2017–18 SMU Mustangs women's basketball team
Players
Coaches

Pos.	#	Name	Height	Year	Previous school	Hometown
G	0	Kiara Perry	5 ft 10 in (1.78 m)	RS Sr	Duncanville	Duncanville, TX
G	1	Devri Owens	5 ft 8 in (1.73 m)	RS Sr	Plano West HS; Utah	Plano, TX
G	2	Ariana Whitfield	5 ft 6 in (1.68 m)	Fr	Cypress Ranch	Houston, TX
G	3	McKenzie Adams	5 ft 9 in (1.75 m)	RS Sr	Frisco Centennial; Arkansas	Frisco, TX
G	4	Mikayla Reese	5 ft 8 in (1.73 m)	Sr	Sand Creek	Colorado Springs, CO
G	5	Aurmani DeGar	5 ft 8 in (1.73 m)	Sr	Mansfield Timberview	Arlington, TX
F	10	Alicia Froling	6 ft 3 in (1.91 m)	Sr	Australia Institute of Sport	Queensland, Australia
G	12	Morgan Smith	5 ft 6 in (1.68 m)	Fr	Highland Park	Dallas, TX
C	13	Klara Bradshaw	6 ft 6 in (1.98 m)	RS Sr	Rains; TCU	Emory, TX
F	15	Stephanie Collins	6 ft 5 in (1.96 m)	Sr	Australia Institute of Sport	Melbourne, Australia
F	20	Dai'ja Thomas	6 ft 2 in (1.88 m)	Jr	Skyline	Dallas, TX
F	21	Makenzie Ellis (redshirt)	6 ft 2 in (1.88 m)	Jr	Booker T. Washington; Colorado	Tulsa, OK
G	23	Savannah Ellis	5 ft 10 in (1.78 m)	Fr	Booker T. Washington	Tulsa, OK
F	33	Johnasia Cash	6 ft 2 in (1.88 m)	Fr	McKeesport	McKeesport, PA

Head coach

- Travis Mays (Texas)

Assistant coach(es)

- Mike Brandt (Sterling (KS))
- Erica White (LSU)
- Amie Smith Bradley (Texas)

Legend

- (C) Team captain
- (S) Suspended
- (I) Ineligible
- (W) Walk-on
- Injured
- Current redshirt

Roster
Last update: October 9, 2017

== Schedule and results ==
Date time, TV	Rank^{#}	Opponent^{#}	Result	Record	Site (attendance) city, state
Non-conference regular season
11/10/2017*; 11:30 am		Nicholls State	W 68–61	1–0	Moody Coliseum (1,368); Dallas, TX
11/14/2017*; 7:00 pm		TCU	L 58–64	1–1	Moody Coliseum (938); Dallas, TX
11/17/2017*; 7:00 pm		at No. 21 Oklahoma	L 75–87	1–2	Lloyd Noble Center (2,538); Norman, OK
11/19/2017*; 2:00 pm, ESPN3		at Texas–Arlington	L 55–58	1–3	College Park Center (649); Arlington, TX
11/21/2017*; 7:00 pm		Abilene Christian	W 65–44	2–3	Moody Coliseum (960); Dallas, TX
11/24/2017*; 6:30 pm		vs. UC Riverside; Nugget Classic semifinals	W 73–51	3–3	Lawlor Events Center (146); Reno, NV
11/26/2017*; 4:00 pm		at Nevada; Nugget Classic championship	L 72–80	3–4	Lawlor Events Center (1,586); Reno, NV
11/29/2017*; 11:30 am		at North Texas	L 40–47	3–5	The Super Pit (3,243); Denton, TX
12/03/2017*; 2:00 pm		Cal State Bakersfield	W 41–29	4–5	Moody Coliseum (777); Dallas, TX
12/17/2017*; 2:00 pm		at Alabama	L 44–59	4–6	Coleman Coliseum (2,229); Tuscaloosa, AL
12/20/2017*; 1:00 pm		Loyola Marymount	W 63–60	5–6	Moody Coliseum (656); Dallas, TX
12/22/2017*; 1:00 pm		McNeese State	W 65–59	6–6	Moody Coliseum (651); Dallas, TX
12/28/2017*; 7:00 pm		at No. 22 Texas A&M	L 57–79	6–7	Reed Arena (4,316); College Station, TX
AAC regular season
12/30/2017; 2:00 pm		Houston	L 75–85	6–8 (0–1)	Moody Coliseum (992); Dallas, TX
01/03/2018; 7:00 pm		UCF	L 42–60	6–9 (0–2)	Moody Coliseum (850); Dallas, TX
01/07/2018; 11:00 am, ESPNU		at Temple	L 52–55	6–10 (0–3)	McGonigle Hall (782); Philadelphia, PA
01/13/2018; 2:00 pm, ADN		East Carolina	W 65–51	7–10 (1–3)	Moody Coliseum (720); Dallas, TX
01/16/2018; 2:00 pm		at Wichita State	L 43–66	7–11 (1–4)	Charles Koch Arena (1,088); Wichita, KS
01/20/2018; 1:00 pm, ADN		at UCF	L 43–58	7–12 (1–5)	CFE Arena (3,176); Orlando, FL
01/24/2018; 2:00 pm, ADN		Cincinnati	L 40–58	7–13 (1–6)	Moody Coliseum (946); Dallas, TX
01/27/2018; 2:00 pm		at Houston	L 56–60	7–14 (1–7)	H&PE Arena (746); Houston, TX
01/31/2018; 7:00 pm, ESPN3		Temple	W 60–56	8–14 (2–7)	Moody Coliseum (1,325); Dallas, TX
02/03/2018; 4:00 pm		at East Carolina	L 47–76	8–15 (2–8)	Williams Arena (882); Greenville, NC
02/07/2018; 7:00 pm		Tulsa	W 74–70	9–15 (3–8)	Moody Coliseum (984); Dallas, TX
02/10/2018; 2:00 pm		at Memphis	W 53–35	10–15 (4–8)	Elma Roane Fieldhouse (437); Memphis, TN
02/14/2018; 6:00 pm, ADN		at No. 22 South Florida	L 54–64	10–16 (4–9)	USF Sun Dome (2,004); Tampa, FL
02/17/2018; 2:00 pm		Wichita State	L 45–52	10–17 (4–10)	Moody Coliseum (1,286); Dallas, TX
02/24/2018; 5:00 pm, SNY/ESPN3		No. 1 Connecticut	L 36–80	10–18 (4–11)	Moody Coliseum (6,981); Dallas, TX
02/26/2018; 7:00 pm, ESPN3		at Tulane	L 46–52	10–19 (4–12)	Devlin Fieldhouse (845); New Orleans, LA
AAC Women's Tournament
03/03/2018; 1:00 pm, ESPN3	(10)	vs. (7) East Carolina; First Round	L 74–85	10–20	Mohegan Sun Arena (1,380); Uncasville, CT
*Non-conference game. ^{#}Rankings from AP Poll. (#) Tournament seedings in parentheses. All times are in Central Time.

== See also ==
- 2017–18 SMU Mustangs men's basketball team
