= 2017–18 Temple Owls women's basketball team =

Intercollegiate basketball season

2017–18 Temple Owls women's basketball
- Conference: American Athletic Conference
- Record: 12–19 (3–13 The American)
- Head coach: Tonya Cardoza (10th season)
- Assistant coaches: Way Veney; Willnett Crockett; Crayton Jones
- Home arena: Liacouras Center; McGonigle Hall

2017–18 American Athletic Conference women's basketball standings
	Conf.				Overall
Team	W		L	PCT	W		L	PCT
No. 1 UConn †	16	–	0	1.000	36	–	1	.973
No. 19 South Florida	13	–	3	.813	26	–	8	.765
UCF	12	–	4	.750	22	–	11	.667
Cincinnati	10	–	6	.625	19	–	13	.594
Houston	9	–	7	.563	20	–	12	.625
Wichita State	9	–	7	.563	14	–	17	.452
East Carolina	7	–	9	.438	16	–	15	.516
Tulane	5	–	11	.313	14	–	17	.452
Memphis	5	–	11	.313	10	–	20	.333
SMU	4	–	12	.250	10	–	20	.333
Temple	3	–	13	.188	12	–	19	.387
Tulsa	3	–	13	.188	10	–	21	.323
† 2018 American Tournament winner As of 30 March 2018; Rankings from AP poll

The 2017–18 Temple Owls women's basketball team represented Temple University during the 2017–18 NCAA Division I women's basketball season. The season marked the fifth for the Owls as members of the American Athletic Conference. The Owls, led by tenth year head coach Tonya Cardoza, played their home games at McGonigle Hall and the Liacouras Center.

The team finished the season 12–19, 3–13 in AAC play to finish a tie for last place. They advanced to the quarterfinals of the American Athletic Conference women's tournament, where they lost to UCF.

== Media ==
All Owls home games have video streaming on Owls TV, ESPN3, or AAC Digital. Road games are typically streamed on the opponent's website, though conference road games may also appear on ESPN3 or AAC Digital. There are no radio broadcasts for Owls women's basketball games.

== Roster ==
2017–18 Temple Owls women's basketball team
Players
Coaches

Pos.	#	Name	Height	Year	Previous school	Hometown
G	0	Alliya Butts	5 ft 4 in (1.63 m)	Sr	Holy Cross	Edgewater Park, NJ
F	1	Lena Niang	6 ft 2 in (1.88 m)	Jr	Rivedale Baptist; NC State	Bowie, MD
F	2	Breanna Perry	6 ft 1 in (1.85 m)	Fr	Flushing	Mt. Morris, MI
G	3	Desiree Oliver	5 ft 7 in (1.7 m)	Fr	Penn Hills	Pittsburgh, PA
G	4	Mykia Jones	5 ft 8 in (1.73 m)	RS Sr	Millbrook; Georgetown	Raleigh, NC
F	5	Tajae Stevenson	6 ft 0 in (1.83 m)	Fr	Paterson Kennedy	Paterson, NJ
G	10	Nicolette Mayo	5 ft 8 in (1.73 m)	Fr	Hephzibah	Hephzibah, GA
C	11	Shannen Atkinson	6 ft 4 in (1.93 m)	So	Smithfield	Smithfield, VA
G	12	Emani Mayo	5 ft 8 in (1.73 m)	Fr	Hephzibah	Hephzibah, GA
G	21	Khadijah Berger	5 ft 10 in (1.78 m)	Sr	Hampton	Hampton, VA
G	22	Tanaya Atkinson	5 ft 9 in (1.75 m)	Sr	Hill Regional Career	New Haven, CT
G	23	Deja Reynolds	5 ft 9 in (1.75 m)	Jr	Riverdale Baptist	Philadelphia, PA
F	24	Shantay Taylor	6 ft 3 in (1.91 m)	So	Spring Valley	Columbia, SC
F	25	Mia Davis	6 ft 0 in (1.83 m)	Fr	St. Frances Academy	Baltimore, MD

Head coach

- Tonya Cardoza (Virginia)

Assistant coach(es)

- Way Veney (College of Charleston)
- Willnett Crockett (Connecticut)
- C. J. Jones (Francis Marion)

Legend

- (C) Team captain
- (S) Suspended
- (I) Ineligible
- (W) Walk-on
- Injured
- Current redshirt

Roster
Last update: October 10, 2017

== Schedule and results ==
Date time, TV	Rank^{#}	Opponent^{#}	Result	Record	Site (attendance) city, state
Exhibition
11/04/2017*; 2:00 pm		University of Charleston	W 92–44		McGonigle Hall; Philadelphia, PA
Regular season
11/10/2017*; 7:00 pm		Delaware State	W 96–72	1–0	McGonigle Hall (1,202); Philadelphia, PA
11/13/2017*; 7:00 pm, ESPN3		Rutgers	L 67–84	1–1	McGonigle Hall (1,158); Philadelphia, PA
11/16/2017*; 7:00 pm		Wagner	W 70–36	2–1	McGonigle Hall (903); Philadelphia, PA
11/19/2017*; 7:00 pm, ESPN3		at Iona	W 59–54	3–1	Hynes Athletic Center (619); New Rochelle, NY
11/22/2017*; 1:00 pm		at La Salle	W 69–52	4–1	Tom Gola Arena (356); Philadelphia, PA
11/25/2017*; 2:00 pm		Ole Miss	L 48–64	4–2	McGonigle Hall (1,187); Philadelphia, PA
11/29/2017*; 7:00 pm		Saint Joseph's	W 69–66	5–2	McGonigle Hall (1,028); Philadelphia, PA
12/02/2017*; 2:00 pm		Harvard	W 86–64	6–2	McGonigle Hall (1,084); Philadelphia, PA
12/07/2017*; 7:00 pm		Hampton	W 65–56	7–2	McGonigle Hall (916); Philadelphia, PA
12/10/2017*; 2:00 pm		No. 22 Villanova	L 65–69	7–3	McGonigle Hall (1,184); Philadelphia, PA
12/16/2017*; 2:00 pm		Marist	W 83–77	8–3	McGonigle Hall (982); Philadelphia, PA
12/21/2017*; 7:00 pm, ESPN3		No. 4 South Carolina	L 60–87	8–4	Liacouras Center (3,185); Philadelphia, PA
12/30/2017; 7:00 pm		at UCF	L 46–76	8–5 (0–1)	CFE Arena (2,789); Orlando, FL
01/07/2018; 12:00 pm, ESPNU		SMU	W 55–52	9–5 (1–1)	McGonigle Hall (782); Philadelphia, PA
01/10/2018; 7:00 pm, ESPN3		South Florida	L 73–89	9–6 (1–2)	McGonigle Hall (702); Philadelphia, PA
01/13/2018; 1:00 pm		at Cincinnati	L 72–80	9–7 (1–3)	Saint Ursula Academy Gym (302); Cincinnati, OH
01/16/2018; 7:00 pm, ESPN3		Houston	L 75–99	9–8 (1–4)	McGonigle Hall (1,008); Philadelphia, PA
01/21/2018; 1:00 pm, ESPN2		No. 1 Connecticut	L 57–113	9–9 (1–5)	McGonigle Hall (3,392); Philadelphia, PA
01/24/2018*; 7:00 pm		Penn	L 59–74	9–10	McGonigle Hall (936); Philadelphia, PA
01/28/2018; 12:00 pm, ESPNU		at South Florida	L 60–76	9–11 (1–6)	USF Sun Dome (2,080); Tampa, FL
01/31/2018; 8:00 pm, ESPN3		at SMU	L 56–60	9–12 (1–7)	Moody Coliseum (1,325); Dallas, TX
02/03/2018; 1:00 pm		Tulsa	W 76–75	10–12 (2–7)	McGonigle Hall (952); Philadelphia, PA
02/07/2018; 8:00 pm, ESPN3		at Tulane	L 65–69	10–13 (2–8)	Devlin Fieldhouse (625); New Orleans, LA
02/10/2018; 2:00 pm, ADN		UCF	L 57–64	10–14 (2–9)	McGonigle Hall (1,211); Philadelphia, PA
02/14/2018; 8:00 pm		at Wichita State	L 81–88	10–15 (2–10)	Charles Koch Arena (1,169); Wichita, KS
02/18/2018; 2:00 pm, CBSSN		at No. 1 Connecticut	L 45–106	10–16 (2–11)	XL Center (13,110); Hartford, CT
02/21/2018; 12:00 pm, ESPN3		Cincinnati	L 52–70	10–17 (2–12)	Liacouras Center (4,305); Philadelphia, PA
02/24/2018; 1:00 pm		at East Carolina	W 65–64	11–17 (3–12)	Williams Arena (1,171); Greenville, NC
02/26/2018; 7:00 pm, CBSSN		Memphis	L 78–83 ^{OT}	11–18 (3–13)	McGonigle Hall; Philadelphia, PA
AAC Women's Tournament
03/03/2018; 12:00 pm, ESPN3	(11)	vs. (6) Wichita State; First Round	W 72–59	12–18	Mohegan Sun Arena (1,380); Uncasville, CT
03/04/2018; 12:00 pm, ESPN3	(11)	vs. (3) UCF; Quarterfinals	L 70–77	12–19	Mohegan Sun Arena (3,392); Uncasville, CT
*Non-conference game. ^{#}Rankings from AP Poll. (#) Tournament seedings in parentheses. All times are in Eastern Time.

== Rankings ==
Regular season polls
Poll	Pre- season	Week 2	Week 3	Week 4	Week 5	Week 6	Week 7	Week 8	Week 9	Week 10	Week 11	Week 12	Week 13	Week 14	Week 15	Week 16	Week 17	Week 18	Week 19	Final
AP	NR	NR	NR	NR	NR	NR	NR	NR												N/A
Coaches	RV	N/A	NR	NR	NR	NR	NR	NR												

Legend
	Increase in ranking
	Decrease in ranking
	Not ranked previous week
(RV)	Received votes

== See also ==
- 2017–18 Temple Owls men's basketball team
