= 2017–18 Wichita State Shockers women's basketball team =

Intercollegiate basketball season

2017–18 Wichita State Shockers women's basketball
- Conference: American Athletic Conference
- Record: 14–17 (9–7 The American)
- Head coach: Keitha Adams (1st season)
- Assistant coaches: Ewa Laskowska; Bill Damuth; Kelli Bagley
- Home arena: Charles Koch Arena (10,506)

2017–18 American Athletic Conference women's basketball standings
	Conf.				Overall
Team	W		L	PCT	W		L	PCT
No. 1 UConn †	16	–	0	1.000	36	–	1	.973
No. 19 South Florida	13	–	3	.813	26	–	8	.765
UCF	12	–	4	.750	22	–	11	.667
Cincinnati	10	–	6	.625	19	–	13	.594
Houston	9	–	7	.563	20	–	12	.625
Wichita State	9	–	7	.563	14	–	17	.452
East Carolina	7	–	9	.438	16	–	15	.516
Tulane	5	–	11	.313	14	–	17	.452
Memphis	5	–	11	.313	10	–	20	.333
SMU	4	–	12	.250	10	–	20	.333
Temple	3	–	13	.188	12	–	19	.387
Tulsa	3	–	13	.188	10	–	21	.323
† 2018 American Tournament winner As of 30 March 2018; Rankings from AP poll

The 2017–18 Wichita State Shockers women's basketball team represented Wichita State University in the 2017–18 NCAA Division I women's basketball season. They played their home games at Charles Koch Arena, which has a capacity of 10,506. The Shockers, led by first year head coach Keitha Adams were first year members of the American Athletic Conference. They finished the season 14–17, 9–7 in AAC play to finish in a tie for fifth place. They lost in the first round of the AAC women's tournament to Temple.

== Roster ==
2017–18 Wichita State Shockers women's basketball team
Players
Coaches

Pos.	#	Name	Height	Year	Previous school	Hometown
G	1	Keke Thompson	5 ft 5 in (1.65 m)	Sr	Shelton State	Tuscaloosa, AL
G	3	Aundra Stovall	5 ft 2 in (1.57 m)	Sr	Seguin HS	Arlington, TX
G	4	Diamond Lockhart	5 ft 5 in (1.65 m)	RS Sr	Red Oak HS	Red Oak, TX
G	5	Jeliah Preston	5 ft 7 in (1.7 m)	Sr	Klein Forest HS; Blinn JC	Houston, TX
G	10	Tamara Lee	5 ft 8 in (1.73 m)	Sr	Edmond Santa Fe HS; Butler CC/Denver	Edmond, OK
F	11	Sabrina Lozada-Cabbage	6 ft 2 in (1.88 m)	Jr	Santa Fe HS	Santa Fe, NM
G	12	Fanny Hakanson	5 ft 8 in (1.73 m)	Fr		Stockholm, Sweden
F	13	Raven Prince	6 ft 1 in (1.85 m)	Jr	Millwood HS; Butler CC	Oklahoma City, OK
F	15	Khady Sene	6 ft 1 in (1.85 m)	So	Lycee Cald Mbour	M'Bour, Senegal
F	22	Alyssia Faye	6 ft 2 in (1.88 m)	Fr	Lycée Jean Mermoz	Valence, France
G	25	Jaleesa Chapel	5 ft 9 in (1.75 m)	RS Sr	Dekaney HS	Spring, TX
G	30	Cesaria Ambrosio	6 ft 0 in (1.83 m)	Jr	Redlands CC	Fully, Switzerland
F	35	Rangie Bessard	6 ft 0 in (1.83 m)	RS Sr	Manvel HS	Rosharon, TX
F	40	Angiee Tompkins	6 ft 2 in (1.88 m)	Sr	Charlotte HS; South Georgia Tech	Americus, GA
F/C	42	Asia Henderson	6 ft 3 in (1.91 m)	Fr	South View HS	Hope Mills, NC

Head coach

- Keitha Adams (Southwestern)

Assistant coach(es)

- Ewa Laskowska (Kansas State)
- Bill Damuth (UT Tyler)
- Kelli Bagley (UTEP)

Legend

- (C) Team captain
- (S) Suspended
- (I) Ineligible
- (W) Walk-on
- Injured
- Current redshirt

Roster
Last update: October 31, 2017

== Schedule ==
Date time, TV	Rank^{#}	Opponent^{#}	Result	Record	Site (attendance) city, state
Exhibition
11/01/2017*; 7:00 pm		Oklahoma Baptist	W 65–54		Charles Koch Arena (1,517); Wichita, KS
11/04/2017*; 1:00 pm		Southwest Baptist	W 82–64		Charles Koch Arena; Wichita, KS
Non-conference regular season
11/10/2017*; 11:30 am		at Creighton	L 61–66	0–1	D. J. Sokol Arena (1,323); Omaha, NE
11/14/2017*; 7:00 pm		at Oklahoma State	L 67–91	0–2	Gallagher-Iba Arena (1,543); Stillwater, OK
11/18/2017*; 2:00 pm		South Dakota	L 48–62	0–3	Charles Koch Arena (2,115); Wichita, KS
11/20/2017*; 6:00 pm		at No. 12 Tennessee	L 56–68	0–4	Thompson-Boling Arena (7,818); Knoxville, TN
11/24/2017*; 8:00 pm		at New Mexico; UNM Thanksgiving Tournament	L 62–76	0–5	Dreamstyle Arena (4,560); Albuquerque, NM
11/25/2017*; 1:00 pm		vs. Illinois; UNM Thanksgiving Tournament	L 67–68	0–6	Dreamstyle Arena (4,425); Albuquerque, NM
11/26/2017*; 1:00 pm		at UC Irvine; UNM Thanksgiving Tournament	W 76–53	1–6	Dreamstyle Arena (4,663); Albuquerque, NM
11/29/2017*; 7:00 pm, ESPN3		Missouri State	W 72–58	2–6	Charles Koch Arena (1,988); Wichita, KS
12/01/2017*; 12:00 pm		Western Illinois	L 65–78	2–7	Charles Koch Arena (8,069); Wichita, KS
12/07/2017*; 7:00 pm, ESPN3		at Missouri State	L 71–94	2–8	JQH Arena (1,821); Springfield, MO
12/09/2017*; 2:00 pm		UMKC	W 72–63	3–8	Charles Koch Arena (1,050); Wichita, KS
12/15/2017*; 7:00 pm		Chicago State; Shocker Winter Classic	W 66–63	4–8	Charles Koch Arena (1,248); Wichita, KS
12/16/2017*; 6:00 pm		Alcorn State; Shocker Winter Classic	W 87–46	5–8	Charles Koch Arena (1,203); Wichita, KS
12/20/2017*; 7:00 pm		at South Dakota State	L 64–96	5–9	Frost Arena (1,486); Brookings, SD
AAC regular season
12/30/2017; 2:00 pm, ESPN3		Tulsa	L 62–67	5–10 (0–1)	Charles Koch Arena (1,328); Wichita, KS
01/02/2018; 7:00 pm		at Houston	L 55–73	5–11 (0–2)	H&PE Arena (652); Houston, TX
01/06/2018; 1:00 pm, ADN		at UCF	L 53–59	5–12 (0–3)	CFE Arena (3,385); Orlando, FL
01/10/2018; 7:00 pm		Memphis	W 69–61	6–12 (1–3)	Charles Koch Arena (1,176); Wichita, KS
01/13/2018; 2:30 pm		at Tulane	W 64–56	7–12 (2–3)	Devlin Fieldhouse (604); New Orleans, LA
01/16/2018; 7:00 pm, Cox Kansas		SMU	W 66–43	8–12 (3–3)	Charles Koch Arena (1,088); Wichita, KS
01/21/2018; 3:00 pm, CBSSN		South Florida	W 64–56	9–12 (4–3)	Charles Koch Arena (1,462); Wichita, KS
01/27/2018; 1:00 pm		at Memphis	W 77–64	10–12 (5–3)	Elma Roane Fieldhouse (457); Memphis, TN
01/30/2018; 6:00 pm, ADN		at East Carolina	L 67–77	10–13 (5–4)	Williams Arena (851); Greenville, NC
02/03/2018; 2:00 pm, ADN		Houston	L 62–73	10–14 (5–5)	Charles Koch Arena (1,907); Wichita, KS
02/07/2018; 7:00 pm, Cox Kansas		Cincinnati	L 69–75	10–15 (5–6)	Charles Koch Arena (1,346); Wichita, KS
02/10/2018; 12:00 pm, SNY/ESPN3		at No. 1 Connecticut	L 43–124	10–16 (5–7)	XL Center (11,343); Hartford, CT
02/14/2018; 7:00 pm, Cox Kansas		Temple	W 88–81	11–16 (6–7)	Charles Koch Arena (1,169); Wichita, KS
02/17/2018; 2:00 pm		at SMU	W 52–45	12–16 (7–7)	Moody Coliseum (1,286); Dallas, TX
02/24/2018; 2:00 pm, Cox Kansas		Tulane	W 81–70	13–16 (8–7)	Charles Koch Arena (2,818); Wichita, KS
02/26/2018; 7:00 pm, ADN		at Tulsa	W 70–59	14–16 (9–7)	Reynolds Center (826); Tulsa, OK
AAC Women's Tournament
03/03/2018; 11:00 am, ESPN3	(6)	vs. (11) Temple; First Round	L 59–72	14–17	Mohegan Sun Arena (1,380); Uncasville, CT
*Non-conference game. ^{#}Rankings from AP Poll. (#) Tournament seedings in parentheses. All times are in Central Time.

== See also ==
- 2017–18 Wichita State Shockers men's basketball team
