= 2017–18 South Florida Bulls women's basketball team =

Intercollegiate basketball season

2017–18 South Florida Bulls women's basketball

NCAA Women's Tournament, first round
- Conference: American Athletic Conference

Ranking
- Coaches: No. 24
- AP: No. 19
- Record: 26–8 (13–3 The American)
- Head coach: Jose Fernandez (18th season)
- Associate head coach: Jeff Osterman
- Assistant coaches: Michele Woods-Baxter; Jesyka Burks-Wiley
- Home arena: USF Sun Dome

2017–18 American Athletic Conference women's basketball standings
	Conf.				Overall
Team	W		L	PCT	W		L	PCT
No. 1 UConn †	16	–	0	1.000	36	–	1	.973
No. 19 South Florida	13	–	3	.813	26	–	8	.765
UCF	12	–	4	.750	22	–	11	.667
Cincinnati	10	–	6	.625	19	–	13	.594
Houston	9	–	7	.563	20	–	12	.625
Wichita State	9	–	7	.563	14	–	17	.452
East Carolina	7	–	9	.438	16	–	15	.516
Tulane	5	–	11	.313	14	–	17	.452
Memphis	5	–	11	.313	10	–	20	.333
SMU	4	–	12	.250	10	–	20	.333
Temple	3	–	13	.188	12	–	19	.387
Tulsa	3	–	13	.188	10	–	21	.323
† 2018 American Tournament winner As of 30 March 2018; Rankings from AP poll

The 2017–18 South Florida Bulls women's basketball team represented the University of South Florida in the 2017–18 NCAA Division I women's basketball season. The Bulls, coached by Jose Fernandez in his eighteenth season, played their home games at the USF Sun Dome in Tampa, Florida. This was USF's fifth season as a member of the American Athletic Conference, known as The American or AAC. They finished the season 26–8, 13–3 in AAC play to finish in second place. They advanced to the championship game of the American Athletic Conference women's tournament for the fourth year in a row, where they lost to Connecticut for the fourth time. They received at-large bid to the NCAA women's tournament, where they were upset by Buffalo in the first round.

== Media ==
All Bulls games aired on Bullscast Radio or CBS 1010 AM. Conference home games rotated between ESPN3, AAC Digital, and Bullscast. Road games were typically streamed on the opponent's website, though some conference road games also appeared on ESPN3 or AAC Digital.

== Roster ==
2017–18 South Florida Bulls women's basketball team
Players
Coaches

Pos.	#	Name	Height	Year	Previous school	Hometown
G/F	3	Jazzmaine Bond	6 ft 3 in (1.91 m)	So	Blackman	Murfreesboro, TN
PG	4	Alba Prieto	5 ft 11 in (1.8 m)	Fr		Seville, Spain
G	5	Vanessa Blagmon	5 ft 8 in (1.73 m)	Fr	Norcross	Stockbridge, GA
G/F	10	Laura Ferreira	5 ft 11 in (1.8 m)	Sr	Escola Secundária De Santo André	Lisbon, Portugal
F	12	Maria Jesperson	6 ft 0 in (1.83 m)	Sr	Marselisborg	Hojbjerg, Denmark
G	13	Dorottya Nagy	5 ft 8 in (1.73 m)	So	PINKK-Pécsi	Pécs, Hungary
F	21	Shea Leverett	6 ft 2 in (1.88 m)	RS Fr	South Effingham HS	Rincon, GA
G	22	Laia Flores	5 ft 7 in (1.7 m)	Sr	Institut Municipal Biada	Mataró, Spain
C	23	Tamara Henshaw	6 ft 1 in (1.85 m)	So	Flagler Palm Coast HS	Palm Coast, FL
G	24	Enna Penhadzic	5 ft 9 in (1.75 m)	RS Fr	None	Denmark
F	33	Kitija Laksa	6 ft 0 in (1.83 m)	Jr	Rigas Francu Licejs	Riga, Latvia
F	34	Silvia Serrat	6 ft 1 in (1.85 m)	Fr		Banyoles, Spain
C	54	Alyssa Rader	6 ft 2 in (1.88 m)	So	Horizon	Thornton, CO

Head coach

- Jose Fernandez (Miami-Dade Kendall)

Assistant coach(es)

- Jeff Osterman (Siena)
- Michele Woods-Baxter (St. John Fisher College)
- Jesyka Burks-Wiley (Boston University)

Legend

- (C) Team captain
- (S) Suspended
- (I) Ineligible
- (W) Walk-on
- Injured
- Current redshirt

Roster
Last update: October 9, 2017

== Schedule ==
Date time, TV	Rank^{#}	Opponent^{#}	Result	Record	Site (attendance) city, state
Regular season
11/10/2017*; 5:30 pm	No. 23	LSU	W 61–55	1–0	USF Sun Dome (4,192); Tampa, FL
11/12/2017*; 2:00 pm	No. 23	Houston Baptist	W 90–43	2–0	USF Sun Dome (2,022); Tampa, FL
11/17/2017*; 7:00 pm	No. 22	Arkansas State	W 98–55	3–0	USF Sun Dome (2,276); Tampa, FL
11/20/2017*; 7:00 pm	No. 17	Butler	W 71–55	4–0	USF Sun Dome (2,223); Tampa, FL
11/24/2017*; 5:00 pm	No. 17	vs. Washington State; Gulf Coast Showcase Quarterfinals	W 82–45	5–0	Germain Arena (1,207); Estero, FL
11/25/2017*; 7:30 pm	No. 17	vs. No. 6 Notre Dame; Gulf Coast Showcase semifinals	L 66–76	5–1	Germain Arena (1,537); Estero, FL
11/26/2017*; 5:00 pm	No. 17	vs. St. John's; Gulf Coast Showcase 3rd place game	W 68–59	6–1	Germain Arena (1,707); Estero, FL
12/02/2017*; 2:00 pm	No. 17	at George Washington	W 83–78	7–1	Charles E. Smith Center (1,125); Washington, D.C.
12/09/2017*; 3:00 pm	No. 16	at Oklahoma	L 74–79	7–2	Lloyd Noble Center (3,896); Norman, OK
12/15/2017*; 7:00 pm	No. 22	Southern	W 108–48	8–2	USF Sun Dome (2,047); Tampa, FL
12/17/2017*; 3:00 pm	No. 22	vs. FIU	W 82–52	9–2	Rick Case Arena (350); Fort Lauderdale, FL
12/20/2017*; 8:30 pm	No. 22	vs. Dayton; New Orleans Shootout	W 93–87 ^{OT}	10–2	Convocation Center (183); New Orleans, LA
12/20/2017*; 8:30 pm	No. 22	vs. Michigan State; New Orleans Shootout	L 73–83	10–3	Convocation Center (420); New Orleans, LA
12/31/2017; 12:00 pm, ESPNU	No. 25	Tulane	W 75–46	11–3 (1–0)	USF Sun Dome (2,018); Tampa, FL
01/03/2018; 7:00 pm		at Cincinnati	W 69–46	12–3 (2–0)	St. Ursula Academy Gymnasium (322); Cincinnati, OH
01/06/2018; 7:00 pm, SNY/ESPN3		No. 1 Connecticut	L 49–100	12–4 (2–1)	USF Sun Dome (6,659); Tampa, FL
01/10/2018; 7:00 pm, ESPN3		at Temple	W 89–73	13–4 (3–1)	McGonigle Hall (702); Philadelphia, PA
01/14/2018; 12:00 pm, ESPNU		UCF; Rivalry	W 62–45	14–4 (4–1)	USF Sun Dome (2,370); Tampa, FL
01/17/2018; 8:00 pm, ESPN3		at Memphis	W 81–62	15–4 (5–1)	Elma Roane Fieldhouse (454); Memphis, TN
01/21/2018; 4:00 pm, CBSSN		at Wichita State	L 56–64	15–5 (5–2)	Charles Koch Arena (1,462); Wichita, KS
01/28/2018; 12:00 pm, ESPNU		Temple	W 76–60	16–5 (6–2)	USF Sun Dome (2,080); Tampa, FL
01/31/2018; 8:00 pm, ESPN3		at Tulsa	W 71–57	17–5 (7–2)	Reynolds Center (157); Tulsa, OK
02/03/2018; 2:00 pm, ESPN3		at Tulane	W 63–53	18–5 (8–2)	Devlin Fieldhouse (775); New Orleans, LA
02/07/2018; 7:00 pm		East Carolina	W 88–49	19–5 (9–2)	USF Sun Dome (2,009); Tampa, FL
02/11/2018*; 2:00 pm, ESPN2		No. 13 Ohio State	W 84–65	20–5	USF Sun Dome (2,852); Tampa, FL
02/14/2018; 7:00 pm, ADN	No. 22	SMU	W 64–54	21–5 (10–2)	USF Sun Dome (2,004); Tampa, FL
02/18/2018; 12:00 pm, CBSSN	No. 22	at UCF; Rivalry	W 77–68 ^{OT}	22–5 (11–2)	CFE Arena (3,550); Orlando, FL
02/21/2018; 7:00 pm	No. 18	Houston	W 81–65	23–5 (12–2)	USF Sun Dome (2,223); Tampa, FL
02/24/2018; 5:00 pm	No. 18	Cincinnati	W 84–65	24–5 (13–2)	USF Sun Dome (2,574); Tampa, FL
02/26/2018; 7:00 pm, ESPN2	No. 20	at No. 1 Connecticut	L 53–82	24–6 (13–3)	Gampel Pavilion (9,115); Storrs, CT
AAC Women's Tournament
03/04/2018; 2:30 pm, ESPNU	(2) No. 20	vs. (7) East Carolina; Quarterfinals	W 80–44	25–6	Mohegan Sun Arena (3,392); Uncasville, CT
03/05/2018; 4:30 pm, ESPNU	(2) No. 19	vs. (3) UCF; Semifinals	W 74–59	26–6	Mohegan Sun Arena (6,033); Uncasville, CT
03/06/2018; 5:00 pm, ESPN2	(2) No. 19	vs. (1) No. 1 Connecticut; Championship Game	L 54–70	26–7	Mohegan Sun Arena (7,501); Uncasville, CT
NCAA Women's Tournament
03/17/2018*; 1:30 pm, ESPN2	(6 A) No. 19	vs. (11 A) Buffalo; First Round	L 79–102	26–8	Donald L. Tucker Civic Center (3,507); Tallahassee, FL
*Non-conference game. ^{#}Rankings from AP Poll. (#) Tournament seedings in parentheses. A=Albany Region. All times are in EST.

== Rankings ==
Regular season polls
Poll	Pre- season	Week 2	Week 3	Week 4	Week 5	Week 6	Week 7	Week 8	Week 9	Week 10	Week 11	Week 12	Week 13	Week 14	Week 15	Week 16	Week 17	Week 18	Week 19	Final
AP	23	22	17	17	16	22	22	25	RV	RV	RV	RV	RV	RV	22	18	20	19	19	N/A
Coaches	22	16	17	16	20	20	19	24	22	25	23	23	23	22	21	17	19	19	20	24

Legend
	Increase in ranking
	Decrease in ranking
	Not ranked previous week
(RV)	Received votes

== See also ==
- 2017–18 South Florida Bulls men's basketball team
