= 2017–18 East Carolina Pirates women's basketball team =

Intercollegiate basketball season

2017–18 East Carolina Pirates women's basketball
- Conference: American Athletic Conference
- Record: 16–15 (7–9 AAC)
- Head coach: Heather Macy (8th season)
- Assistant coaches: Rich Conover; Darren Guensch; Nicole Mealing
- Home arena: Williams Arena

2017–18 American Athletic Conference women's basketball standings
	Conf.				Overall
Team	W		L	PCT	W		L	PCT
No. 1 UConn †	16	–	0	1.000	36	–	1	.973
No. 19 South Florida	13	–	3	.813	26	–	8	.765
UCF	12	–	4	.750	22	–	11	.667
Cincinnati	10	–	6	.625	19	–	13	.594
Houston	9	–	7	.563	20	–	12	.625
Wichita State	9	–	7	.563	14	–	17	.452
East Carolina	7	–	9	.438	16	–	15	.516
Tulane	5	–	11	.313	14	–	17	.452
Memphis	5	–	11	.313	10	–	20	.333
SMU	4	–	12	.250	10	–	20	.333
Temple	3	–	13	.188	12	–	19	.387
Tulsa	3	–	13	.188	10	–	21	.323
† 2018 American Tournament winner As of 30 March 2018; Rankings from AP poll

The 2017–18 East Carolina Pirates women's basketball team represented East Carolina University during the 2017–18 NCAA Division I women's basketball season. The Pirates, led by eighth-year head coach Heather Macy, played their home games at Williams Arena at Minges Coliseum in Greenville, North Carolina and were fourth-year members of the American Athletic Conference (AAC). They finished the season 16–15, 2–14 AAC play, to finish in seventh place. They defeated SMU in the first round before losing in the quarterfinals of the AAC women's tournament to South Florida.

== Media ==
All Pirates home games had a video stream on Pirates All Access, ESPN3, or AAC Digital. Road games typically streamed on the opponent's website, though conference road games could also appear on ESPN3 or AAC Digital. Audio broadcasts for most road games were found on the opponent's website.

== Roster ==
2017–18 East Carolina Pirates women's basketball team
Players
Coaches

Pos.	#	Name	Height	Year	Previous school	Hometown
G	0	Justice Gee	5 ft 7 in (1.7 m)	So	Timmonsville	Timmonsville, SC
G	1	Alex Frazier	5 ft 9 in (1.75 m)	Jr	Central Gwinnett	Lawrenceville, GA
G	2	LaShonda Monk	5 ft 6 in (1.68 m)	Fr	Southwest Guilford	Greensboro, NC
G	4	Necole Hope	5 ft 10 in (1.78 m)	Fr	North Point	Waldorf, MD
F	5	Mikayla Sanders	6 ft 0 in (1.83 m)	Sr	Cary Academy; Liberty	Clayton, NC
G	11	Raven Johnson	6 ft 0 in (1.83 m)	So	Parkview	Lilburn, GA
F	12	Tania Pierre-Emile	6 ft 3 in (1.91 m)	Jr	Eastern Arizona CC	Gros-Morne, Martinique
G	14	Ariyana Williams	5 ft 9 in (1.75 m)	Fr	Freedom	Morganton, NC
C	15	Thais Oliveira	6 ft 2 in (1.88 m)	Sr	College of Central Florida	Manaus, Brazil
F	20	Desiree Corbin	6 ft 2 in (1.88 m)	Jr	South Georgia Tech	Griffin, GA
F	21	Salita Greene	5 ft 11 in (1.8 m)	Jr	Jordan; Richmond	Durham, NC
F	22	Tamia Hicks	6 ft 1 in (1.85 m)	Fr	South Raleigh	Knightdale, NC
G/F	23	Dominique Claytor	5 ft 11 in (1.8 m)	So	Winston-Salem Prep	Winston-Salem, NC
F	44	Destiny Campbell	6 ft 1 in (1.85 m)	Jr	Scotland; Cape Fear CC	Laurinburg, NC

Head coach

- Heather Macy (Greensboro)

Assistant coach(es)

- Rich Conover (Green Mountain)
- Darren Guensch (Radford)
- Nicole Mealing (Francis Marion)

Legend

- (C) Team captain
- (S) Suspended
- (I) Ineligible
- (W) Walk-on
- Injured
- Current redshirt

Roster
Last update: October 27, 2024

== Schedule and results ==
Date time, TV	Rank^{#}	Opponent^{#}	Result	Record	Site (attendance) city, state
Non-conference regular season
November 10, 2017*; 8:00 p.m.		USC Upstate	W 66–53	1–0	Williams Arena (954); Greenville, NC
November 15, 2017*; 7:00 p.m.		at UNC Wilmington	L 62–66	1–1	Trask Coliseum (927); Wilmington, NC
November 18, 2017*; 7:00 p.m.		Richmond	L 64–65	1–2	Williams Arena (1,031); Greenville, NC
November 21, 2017*; 7:00 p.m.		William & Mary	L 65–71 ^{OT}	1–3	Williams Arena (841); Greenville, NC
November 25, 2017*; 2:30 p.m.		vs. Jacksonville State; SHU Thanksgiving Classic semifinals	L 73–82	1–4	Walsh Gymnasium (200); South Orange, NJ
November 26, 2017*; 12:00 p.m.		vs. Rider; SHU Thanksgiving Classic consolation game	W 66–63	2–4	Walsh Gymnasium (142); South Orange, NJ
November 30, 2017*; 5:30 p.m.		Charlotte	W 58–55	3–4	Williams Arena (824); Greenville, NC
December 2, 2017*; 2:00 p.m.		Norfolk State	W 51–46	4–4	Williams Arena (636); Greenville, NC
December 4, 2017*; 5:00 p.m.		at Kennesaw State	W 66–56	5–4	KSU Convocation Center (342); Kennesaw, GA
December 14, 2017*; 11:30 a.m.		North Carolina Central	W 73–61	6–4	Williams Arena (5,306); Greenville, NC
December 17, 2017*; 1:30 p.m.		vs. UTEP; Carolinas Challenge	L 79–94 ^{OT}	6–5	Myrtle Beach Convention Center (100); Myrtle Beach, SC
December 20, 2017*; 7:00 p.m.		Savannah State	W 103–37	7–5	Williams Arena (811); Greenville, NC
December 28, 2017*; 7:00 p.m.		Maryland Eastern Shore	W 64–54	8–5	Williams Arena (817); Greenville, NC
AAC regular season
December 30, 2017; 5:00 p.m.		Cincinnati	L 54–66	8–6 (0–1)	Williams Arena (785); Greenville, NC
January 3, 2018; 2:00 p.m., SNY/ESPN3		No. 1 Connecticut	L 35–96	8–7 (0–2)	Williams Arena (1,823); Greenville, NC
January 6, 2018; 1:00 p.m.		at Memphis	L 36–72	8–8 (0–3)	Elma Roane Fieldhouse (376); Memphis, TN
January 10, 2018; 7:00 p.m.		Tulsa	W 73–67	9–8 (1–3)	Williams Arena (759); Greenville, NC
January 13, 2018; 3:00 p.m., ADN		at SMU	L 51–65	9–9 (1–4)	Moody Coliseum (720); Dallas, TX
January 20, 2018; 5:00 p.m.		Houston	W 80–78 ^{OT}	10–9 (2–4)	Williams Arena (1,227); Greenville, NC
January 24, 2018; 8:00 p.m., ESPN3		at Tulane	L 58–64	10–10 (2–5)	Devlin Fieldhouse (585); New Orleans, LA
January 27, 2018; 2:00 p.m.		at Cincinnati	W 79–70 ^{OT}	11–10 (3–5)	St. Ursula Academy Gymnasium (494); Cincinnati, OH
January 30, 2018; 7:00 p.m., ADN		Wichita State	W 77–67	12–10 (4–5)	Williams Arena (851); Greenville, NC
February 3, 2018; 5:00 p.m.		SMU	W 76–47	13–10 (5–5)	Williams Arena (882); Greenville, NC
February 7, 2018; 7:00 p.m.		at South Florida	L 49–88	13–11 (5–6)	USF Sun Dome (2,009); Tampa, FL
February 14, 2018; 7:00 p.m., ESPN3		Memphis	W 75–62	14–11 (6–6)	Williams Arena (756); Greenville, NC
February 17, 2018; 3:00 p.m.		at Houston	L 81–97	14–12 (6–7)	H&PE Arena (667); Houston, TX
February 20, 2018; 8:00 p.m.		at Tulsa	W 59–57	15–12 (7–7)	Reynolds Center (107); Tulsa, OK
February 24, 2018; 1:00 p.m.		Temple	L 64–65	15–13 (7–8)	Williams Arena (1,171); Greenville, NC
February 26, 2018; 7:00 p.m.		at UCF	L 54–75	15–14 (7–9)	CFE Arena (3,339); Orlando, FL
AAC women's tournament
March 3, 2018; 2:00 p.m., ESPN3	(7)	vs. (10) SMU; First round	W 85–74	16–14	Mohegan Sun Arena (1,380); Uncasville, CT
March 4, 2018; 2:30 p.m., ESPNU	(7)	vs. (2) No. 20 South Florida; Quarterfinals	L 44–80	16–15	Mohegan Sun Arena (3,392); Uncasville, CT
*Non-conference game. ^{#}Rankings from AP poll. (#) Tournament seedings in parentheses. All times are in Eastern.

== Rankings ==
Regular-season polls
Poll	Pre- season	Week 2	Week 3	Week 4	Week 5	Week 6	Week 7	Week 8	Week 9	Week 10	Week 11	Week 12	Week 13	Week 14	Week 15	Week 16	Week 17	Week 18	Week 19	Final
AP																				N/A
Coaches																				

Legend
	Increase in ranking
	Decrease in ranking
	Not ranked previous week
(RV)	Received votes

== See also ==
- 2017–18 East Carolina Pirates men's basketball team
