= 2017–18 Tulsa Golden Hurricane women's basketball team =

Intercollegiate basketball season

2017–18 Tulsa Golden Hurricane women's basketball
- Conference: American Athletic Conference
- Record: 10–21 (3–13 The American)
- Head coach: Matilda Mossman (7th season)
- Assistant coaches: Shane Coffey; Tari Cummings; Leah Foster
- Home arena: Reynolds Center

2017–18 American Athletic Conference women's basketball standings
	Conf.				Overall
Team	W		L	PCT	W		L	PCT
No. 1 UConn †	16	–	0	1.000	36	–	1	.973
No. 19 South Florida	13	–	3	.813	26	–	8	.765
UCF	12	–	4	.750	22	–	11	.667
Cincinnati	10	–	6	.625	19	–	13	.594
Houston	9	–	7	.563	20	–	12	.625
Wichita State	9	–	7	.563	14	–	17	.452
East Carolina	7	–	9	.438	16	–	15	.516
Tulane	5	–	11	.313	14	–	17	.452
Memphis	5	–	11	.313	10	–	20	.333
SMU	4	–	12	.250	10	–	20	.333
Temple	3	–	13	.188	12	–	19	.387
Tulsa	3	–	13	.188	10	–	21	.323
† 2018 American Tournament winner As of 30 March 2018; Rankings from AP poll

The 2017–18 Tulsa Golden Hurricane women's basketball team represented the University of Tulsa during the 2017–18 NCAA Division I women's basketball season. The season marked the fourth season for the Golden Hurricane as members of the American Athletic Conference. The Golden Hurricane, led by seventh year head coach Matilda Mossman, played their home games at the Reynolds Center. They finished the season 10–21, 3–13 in AAC play to finish in a tie for last place. They defeated Houston in the first round before losing to Cincinnati in the quarterfinals of the American Athletic women's tournament.

== Media ==
All Golden Hurricane games will be broadcast on KTGX CHROME 95.3 FM and KWTU 88.7 FM HD3. The audio broadcast can also be heard on Hurricane Vision. A video stream for all home games will be on Hurricane Vision, ESPN3, or AAC Digital. Road games will typically be streamed on the opponents website, though conference road games could also appear on ESPN3 or AAC Digital.

== Roster ==
2017–18 Tulsa Golden Hurricane women's basketball team
Players
Coaches

Pos.	#	Name	Height	Year	Previous school	Hometown
F	00	Kendrian Elliott	6 ft 2 in (1.88 m)	So	Wichita South	Wichita, KS
G	2	Tatyana Perez	5 ft 6 in (1.68 m)	Jr	Cypress Woods	Cypress, TX
G	3	Erika Wakefield	5 ft 4 in (1.63 m)	Sr	Heritage Hall	Moore, OK
G	4	Addison Richardson	6 ft 2 in (1.88 m)	So	Bixby	Bixby, OK
G	5	Jasmine Butler	6 ft 0 in (1.83 m)	So	Pearland	Pearland, TX
G	10	Alexis Gaulden	5 ft 8 in (1.73 m)	So	Broken Arrow	Broken Arrow, OK
G	11	Ebony Parker	5 ft 8 in (1.73 m)	Sr	Klein Forest; Blinn College	Houston, TX
G	12	Renetha Dickson	5 ft 9 in (1.75 m)	So	Lutheran North	St. Louis, TX
G	21	Rebecca Lescay	5 ft 8 in (1.73 m)	Fr	Liberty	Plano, TX
G	22	Morgan Brady	5 ft 7 in (1.7 m)	Fr	Parkview Arts & Science	Hensley, AR
F	25	Tyjae' Scales	6 ft 1 in (1.85 m)	Jr	Kinkaid	Houston, TX
F	30	Krystan Vornes	6 ft 2 in (1.88 m)	Fr	Osceola	Osceola, AR
F	33	Crystal Polk	6 ft 2 in (1.88 m)	Jr	Lawton Ike	Lawton, OK

Head coach

- Matilda Mossman (Western Kentucky)

Assistant coach(es)

- Shane Coffey (Oklahoma State)
- Tari Cummings (Oklahoma State)
- Leah Foster (St. Edward's)

Legend

- (C) Team captain
- (S) Suspended
- (I) Ineligible
- (W) Walk-on
- Injured
- Current redshirt

Roster
Last update: September 2, 2017

== Schedule and results ==
Date time, TV	Rank^{#}	Opponent^{#}	Result	Record	Site (attendance) city, state
Exhibition
11/01/2017*; 7:00 pm		Arkansas–Fort Smith	L 58–61		Reynolds Center (256); Tulsa, OK
Non-conference regular season
11/10/2017*; 7:00 pm		American	L 67–72	0–1	Reynolds Center (322); Tulsa, OK
11/12/2017*; 2:00 pm		Belmont	L 65–90	0–2	Reynolds Center (274); Tulsa, OK
11/15/2017*; 11:30 am		at Little Rock	W 74–61	1–2	Jack Stephens Center (2,138); Little Rock, AR
11/18/2017*; 2:00 pm		UMKC	W 76–52	2–2	Reynolds Center (246); Tulsa, OK
11/21/2017*; 8:30 pm		vs. Binghamton; Great Alaska Shootout semifinals	W 60–55	3–2	Alaska Airlines Center (1,700); Anchorage, AK
11/23/2017*; 5:30 pm		at Alaska Anchorage; Great Alaska Shootout championship	L 53–59	3–3	Alaska Airlines Center (1,828); Anchorage, AK
11/29/2017*; 7:00 pm		Oral Roberts; Rivalry	L 41–53	3–4	Reynolds Center (641); Tulsa, OK
12/02/2017*; 3:00 pm		at North Texas	L 43–66	3–5	The Super Pit (1,181); Denton, TX
12/05/2017*; 7:00 pm		Arkansas–Pine Bluff	W 87–37	4–5	Reynolds Center (184); Tulsa, OK
12/10/2017*; 2:00 pm		at Arkansas	L 41–67	4–6	Bud Walton Arena (1,821); Fayetteville, AR
12/16/2017*; 1:00 pm		at South Dakota	W 64–61	5–6	Sanford Coyote Sports Center (1,700); Vermillion, SD
12/19/2017*; 5:00 pm		at Saint Louis	L 66–77	5–7	Chaifetz Arena (822); St. Louis, MO
12/22/2017*; 1:00 pm		Arkansas State	W 68–58	6–7	Reynolds Center (506); Tulsa, OK
AAC regular season
12/30/2017; 2:00 pm, ESPN3		at Wichita State	W 67–62	7–7 (1–0)	Charles Koch Arena (1,328); Wichita, KS
01/03/2018; 11:00 am		Tulane	L 63–72	7–8 (1–1)	Reynolds Center (202); Tulsa, OK
01/06/2018; 2:00 pm		Cincinnati	W 64–51	8–8 (2–1)	Reynolds Center (303); Tulsa, OK
01/10/2018; 6:00 pm		at East Carolina	L 67–73	8–9 (2–2)	Williams Arena (759); Greenville, NC
01/13/2018; 12:00 pm		Memphis	L 48–69	8–10 (2–3)	Reynolds Center (278); Tulsa, OK
01/18/2018; 6:00 pm, SNY/ESPN3		at No. 1 Connecticut	L 60–78	8–11 (2–4)	Harry A. Gampel Pavilion (7,477); Storrs, CT
01/21/2018; 1:00 pm, ESPNU		at Tulane	L 39–70	8–12 (2–5)	Devlin Fieldhouse (710); New Orleans, LA
01/27/2018; 2:00 pm, ADN		UCF	L 44–47	8–13 (2–6)	Reynolds Center (317); Tulsa, OK
01/31/2018; 7:00 pm, ESPN3		South Florida	L 57–71	8–14 (2–7)	Reynolds Center (157); Tulsa, OK
02/03/2018; 12:00 pm, ESPN3		at Temple	L 75–76	8–15 (2–8)	McGonigle Hall (982); Philadelphia, PA
02/07/2018; 7:00 pm		at SMU	L 70–74	9–16 (2–9)	Moody Coliseum (984); Dallas, TX
02/10/2018; 2:00 pm		Houston	W 83–77	9–16 (3–9)	Reynolds Center (470); Tulsa, OK
02/17/2018; 1:00 pm, ADN		at Cincinnati	L 41–78	9–17 (3–10)	Saint Ursula Academy Gym (502); Cincinnati, OH
02/20/2018; 7:00 pm		East Carolina	L 57–59	9–18 (3–11)	Reynolds Center (107); Tulsa, OK
02/24/2018; 1:00 pm		at Memphis	L 56–65	9–19 (3–12)	Elma Roane Fieldhouse (502); Memphis, TN
02/26/2018; 7:00 pm, ADN		Wichita State	L 59–70	9–20 (3–13)	Reynolds Center (826); Tulsa, OK
AAC Women's Tournament
03/03/2018; 7:00 pm, ESPN3	(12)	vs. (5) Houston; First Round	W 98–72	10–20	Mohegan Sun Arena (4,599); Uncasville, CT
03/04/2018; 7:30 pm, ESPN3	(12)	vs. (4) Cincinnati; Quarterfinals	L 65–66	10–21	Mohegan Sun Arena (6,804); Uncasville, CT
*Non-conference game. ^{#}Rankings from AP Poll. (#) Tournament seedings in parentheses. All times are in Central Time.

== See also ==
- 2017–18 Tulsa Golden Hurricane men's basketball team
