= 2017–18 Cincinnati Bearcats women's basketball team =

Intercollegiate basketball season

2017–18 Cincinnati Bearcats women's basketball

WNIT, First Round
- Conference: American Athletic Conference
- Record: 19–13 (10–6 The American)
- Head coach: Jamelle Elliott (9th season)
- Assistant coaches: Tamisha Augustin; Katie Rokus; Eddie Benton
- Home arena: St. Ursula Academy Gymnasium

2017–18 American Athletic Conference women's basketball standings
	Conf.				Overall
Team	W		L	PCT	W		L	PCT
No. 1 UConn †	16	–	0	1.000	36	–	1	.973
No. 19 South Florida	13	–	3	.813	26	–	8	.765
UCF	12	–	4	.750	22	–	11	.667
Cincinnati	10	–	6	.625	19	–	13	.594
Houston	9	–	7	.563	20	–	12	.625
Wichita State	9	–	7	.563	14	–	17	.452
East Carolina	7	–	9	.438	16	–	15	.516
Tulane	5	–	11	.313	14	–	17	.452
Memphis	5	–	11	.313	10	–	20	.333
SMU	4	–	12	.250	10	–	20	.333
Temple	3	–	13	.188	12	–	19	.387
Tulsa	3	–	13	.188	10	–	21	.323
† 2018 American Tournament winner As of 30 March 2018; Rankings from AP poll

The 2017–18 Cincinnati Bearcats women's basketball team represented the University of Cincinnati during the 2017–18 NCAA Division I women's basketball season. The season marked the fifth for the Bearcats as members of the American Athletic Conference. The Bearcats, led by ninth year head coach Jamelle Elliott, played their home games at St. Ursula Academy Gymnasium while their normal on-campus home of Fifth Third Arena was closed for renovation. They finished the season 19–13, 10–6 in AAC play to finish in fourth place. They advanced to the semifinals of the American Athletic women's tournament, where they lost to Connecticut. They received an at-large bid Women's National Invitation Tournament, where they lost in the first round to Michigan State.

Cincinnati announced on March 21 that Elliott would not return after 9 seasons as head coach. She finish at Cincinnati with a 9-year record of 113–162.

== Media ==
All games will have a video stream on Bearcats TV, ESPN3, or AAC Digital Network

== Offseason ==
=== Departing players ===
Name	Number	Pos.	Height	Year	Hometown	Notes
Brandey Tarver	13	G	5'10"	Senior	Chicago, Illinois	Graduated
Bianca Quisenberry	22	G	5'8"	Senior	Springfield, Ohio	Graduated
Sydney Petty	23	F	6'0"	RS Freshman	Toledo, Ohio	Transferred to Owens Community College

=== 2017 Recruits ===
College recruiting information
Name	Hometown	School	Height	Weight	Commit date
Andeija Puckett; F	Griffin, GA	Griffin High School	6 ft 3 in (1.91 m)	N/A	
Andeija Puckett; F	Recruit ratings: ESPN: (90)				
Iimar’i Thomas; F	Oakland, CA	Sacred Heart Cathedral Prep	5 ft 11 in (1.80 m)	N/A	
Iimar’i Thomas; F	Recruit ratings: ESPN: (89)				
Michaela Porter; G	Pittsburgh, PA	Obama Academy of International Studies	5 ft 10 in (1.78 m)	N/A	
Michaela Porter; G	Recruit ratings: ESPN: (87)				
Brianna Livingston; G	Scarborough, ON	Wilfrid Laurier	5 ft 10 in (1.78 m)	N/A	
Brianna Livingston; G	Recruit ratings: No ratings found				
Overall recruit ranking:
Note: In many cases, Scout, Rivals, 247Sports, On3, and ESPN may conflict in their listings of height and weight.; In these cases, the average was taken. ESPN grades are on a 100-point scale.; Sources:

== Roster ==
2017–18 Cincinnati Bearcats women's basketball team
Players
Coaches

Pos.	#	Name	Height	Year	Previous school	Hometown
G	2	Nikira Goings	5 ft 9 in (1.75 m)	Jr	Osborne	Marietta, GA
G	3	Ana Owens	5 ft 6 in (1.68 m)	Sr	Lawrence North	Indianapolis, IN
F	4	Angel Rizor	6 ft 0 in (1.83 m)	So	East Wake	Zebulon, NC
G	5	Genesis Parker	5 ft 8 in (1.73 m)	So	Virginia Tech	Bristow, VA
G	10	Michaela Porter	5 ft 10 in (1.78 m)	Fr	Obama Academy of International Studies	Pittsburgh, PA
G	11	Sam Rodgers	5 ft 9 in (1.75 m)	So	Lakota East	Cincinnati, OH
G	12	Antoinette Miller	5 ft 5 in (1.65 m)	So	Southfield-Lathrup	Detroit, MI
G	13	Brianna Livingston	5 ft 10 in (1.78 m)	Fr	Wilfrid Laurier	Scarborough, ON
G	20	Maya Benham	6 ft 0 in (1.83 m)	Jr	Osborne	Doulgasville, GA
F	21	Shanice Johnson	6 ft 0 in (1.83 m)	Sr	Monroe Community College	Philadelphia, PA
F	22	Iimar’i Thomas	5 ft 11 in (1.8 m)	Fr	Sacred Heart Cathedral Prep	Oakland, CA
F	23	Sydney Petty	6 ft 0 in (1.83 m)	RS Fr	Rogers	Toledo, OH
F	25	Chelsea Warren	6 ft 1 in (1.85 m)	Jr	Red Oak	Red Oak, TX
C	35	I'Liyah Green	6 ft 0 in (1.83 m)	RS Fr	Male	Louisville, KY
C	40	Andeija Puckett	6 ft 3 in (1.91 m)	Fr	Griffin	Griffin, GA

Head coach

- Jamelle Elliott (Connecticut)

Assistant coach(es)

- Tamisha Augustin (Alabama A&M)
- Eddie Benton (Vermont)
- Geoff Lanier (Southern Connecticut)

Legend

- (C) Team captain
- (S) Suspended
- (I) Ineligible
- (W) Walk-on
- Injured
- Current redshirt

Roster
Last update: September 15, 2017

== Schedule and results ==
Date time, TV	Rank^{#}	Opponent^{#}	Result	Record	Site (attendance) city, state
Exhibition
11/02/2017*; 7:00 pm		Findlay	W 77–35		Cincinnati State Gym (327); Cincinnati, OH
Non-conference regular season
11/10/2017*; 7:00 pm		at East Tennessee State	L 77–87	0–1	J. Madison Brooks Gymnasium (1,059); Johnson City, TN
11/13/2017*; 7:00 pm		Slippery Rock (PA)	W 85–52	1–1	Cincinnati State Gym; Cincinnati, OH
11/15/2017*; 7:00 pm		Southeastern Louisiana	W 82–43	2–1	Saint Ursula Academy Gym (330); Cincinnati, OH
11/18/2017*; 2:00 pm		Miami (OH)	W 73–62	3–1	Saint Ursula Academy Gym (500); Cincinnati, OH
11/21/2017*; 7:00 pm		Pittsburgh	L 46–66	3–2	Saint Ursula Academy Gym (524); Cincinnati, OH
11/25/2017*; 2:00 pm		Eastern Kentucky	W 64–53	4–2	Saint Ursula Academy Gym (371); Cincinnati, OH
11/27/2017*; 7:00 pm		Saint Francis (PA)	L 73–77	4–3	Cincinnati State Gym (300); Cincinnati, OH
11/30/2017*; 7:00 pm		Southeast Missouri State	W 65–52	5–3	Saint Ursula Academy Gym (330); Cincinnati, OH
12/03/2017*; 2:00 pm		at Old Dominion	W 54–33	6–3	Ted Constant Convocation Center (1,809); Norfolk, VA
12/10/2017*; 5:00 pm		at Xavier; Crosstown Shootout	L 50–53	6–4	Cintas Center (1,654); Cincinnati, OH
12/14/2017*; 7:00 pm		Howard	W 87–53	7–4	Saint Ursula Academy Gym (303); Cincinnati, OH
12/17/2017*; 4:00 pm, ESPN2		No. 13 Ohio State	L 76–87	7–5	Saint Ursula Academy Gym (1,087); Cincinnati, OH
12/21/2017*; 7:00 pm		Bowling Green	W 75–51	8–5	Saint Ursula Academy Gym (504); Cincinnati, OH
AAC regular season
12/30/2017; 5:00 pm		at East Carolina	W 66–54	9–5 (1–0)	Williams Arena (785); Greenville, NC
01/03/2018; 7:00 pm		South Florida	L 46–69	9–6 (1–1)	Saint Ursula Academy Gym (322); Cincinnati, OH
01/06/2018; 3:00 pm		at Tulsa	L 51–64	9–7 (1–2)	Reynolds Center (303); Tulsa, OK
01/10/2018; 8:00 pm, ESPN3		at Houston	W 88–82	10–7 (2–2)	H&PE Arena (542); Houston, TX
01/13/2018; 1:00 pm		Temple	W 80–72	11–7 (3–2)	Saint Ursula Academy Gym (302); Cincinnati, OH
01/21/2018; 2:00 pm		Memphis	W 64–53	12–7 (4–2)	Saint Ursula Academy Gym (503); Cincinnati, OH
01/24/2018; 8:00 pm, ADN		at SMU	W 58–40	13–7 (5–2)	Moody Coliseum (946); Dallas, TX
01/27/2018; 2:00 pm		East Carolina	L 70–79 ^{OT}	13–8 (5–3)	Saint Ursula Academy Gym (494); Cincinnati, OH
01/30/2018; 7:00 pm		UCF	L 38–50	13–9 (5–4)	Saint Ursula Academy Gym (353); Cincinnati, OH
02/04/2018; 7:00 pm, SNY/ESPN3		at No. 1 Connecticut	L 65–106	13–10 (5–5)	XL Center (12,342); Hartford, CT
02/07/2018; 8:00 pm		at Wichita State	W 75–69	14–10 (6–5)	Charles Koch Arena (1,346); Wichita, KS
02/10/2018; 2:00 pm		Tulane	W 83–52	15–10 (7–5)	Saint Ursula Academy Gym (463); Cincinnati, OH
02/17/2018; 2:00 pm, ADN		Tulsa	W 78–41	16–10 (8–5)	Saint Ursula Academy Gym (502); Cincinnati, OH
02/21/2018; 12:00 pm, ESPN3		at Temple	W 70–52	17–10 (9–5)	Liacouras Center (4,305); Philadelphia, PA
02/24/2018; 5:00 pm		at No. 18 South Florida	L 65–84	17–11 (9–6)	USF Sun Dome (2,574); Tampa, FL
02/26/2018; 7:00 pm		Houston	W 61–57	18–11 (10–6)	Saint Ursula Academy Gym (643); Cincinnati, OH
AAC Women's Tournament
03/04/2018; 8:30 pm, ESPN3	(4)	vs. (12) Tulsa; Quarterfinals	W 66–65	19–11	Mohegan Sun Arena (6,804); Uncasville, CT
03/05/2018; 7:00 pm, ESPN2	(4)	vs. (1) No. 1 Connecticut; Semifinals	L 21–75	19–12	Mohegan Sun Arena (6,033); Uncasville, CT
WNIT
03/15/2018*; 7:00 pm		at Michigan State; First Round	L 75–81	19–13	Breslin Center (1,705); East Lansing, MI
*Non-conference game. ^{#}Rankings from AP Poll. (#) Tournament seedings in parentheses. All times are in EST.

== See also ==
- 2017–18 Cincinnati Bearcats men's basketball team
