= 2017–18 UConn Huskies women's basketball team =

Intercollegiate basketball season

2017–18 UConn Huskies women's basketball

AAC Tournament champions AAC regular season champions

NCAA tournament, Final Four
- Conference: American Athletic Conference

Ranking
- Coaches: No. 3
- AP: No. 1
- Record: 36–1 (16–0 The American)
- Head coach: Geno Auriemma (33rd season)
- Associate head coach: Chris Dailey
- Assistant coaches: Shea Ralph; Marisa Moseley
- Home arena: Harry A. Gampel Pavilion; XL Center

2017–18 American Athletic Conference women's basketball standings
	Conf.				Overall
Team	W		L	PCT	W		L	PCT
No. 1 UConn †	16	–	0	1.000	36	–	1	.973
No. 19 South Florida	13	–	3	.813	26	–	8	.765
UCF	12	–	4	.750	22	–	11	.667
Cincinnati	10	–	6	.625	19	–	13	.594
Houston	9	–	7	.563	20	–	12	.625
Wichita State	9	–	7	.563	14	–	17	.452
East Carolina	7	–	9	.438	16	–	15	.516
Tulane	5	–	11	.313	14	–	17	.452
Memphis	5	–	11	.313	10	–	20	.333
SMU	4	–	12	.250	10	–	20	.333
Temple	3	–	13	.188	12	–	19	.387
Tulsa	3	–	13	.188	10	–	21	.323
† 2018 American Tournament winner As of 30 March 2018; Rankings from AP poll

The 2017–18 UConn Huskies women's basketball team represented the University of Connecticut (UConn) during the 2017–18 NCAA Division I women's basketball season. The Huskies, led by Hall of Fame head coach Geno Auriemma, in his 33rd season at UConn, played their home games at Harry A. Gampel Pavilion and the XL Center and were fifth-year members of the American Athletic Conference. They finished the season 36–1, 16–0 in AAC play, to win the AAC regular season championship. They defeated Tulane, Cincinnati, and South Florida to win the AAC women's tournament title. As a result, they received the conference's automatic bid to the NCAA women's tournament. As the overall No. 1 seed, they defeated Saint Francis (PA) and Quinnipiac to advance to the Sweet Sixteen. They defeated Duke in the Sweet Sixteen and South Carolina in the Elite Eight to reach their 19th Final Four. In the national semifinal, they lost in overtime on a last-second shot for the second consecutive year, this time to Notre Dame, ending the school's 36-game winning streak.

== Previous season ==
The Huskies finished the 2016–17 season 36–1, 16–0 in AAC play, to win the AAC regular season championship. They defeated Tulsa, UCF, and South Florida to win the AAC women's tournament championship. As a result, they received the conference's automatic bid to the NCAA women's tournament. As the overall No. 1 seed, they defeated Albany and Syracuse to advance to the Sweet Sixteen. There, they defeated UCLA to advance to the Elite Eight, where they defeated Oregon. In the National Semifinal, they lost in overtime to Mississippi State, ending the school's 111-game winning streak.

== Offseason ==
=== Departures ===
Name	Number	Pos.	Height	Year	Hometown	Reson for departure
Saniya Chong	12	G	5'8"	Senior	Ossining, NY	Graduated/declared to 2017 WNBA draft
Tierney Lawlor	20	G	5'7"	Senior	Ansonia, CT	Graduated
Natalie Butler	51	C	6'5"	RS Junior	Fairfax Station, VA	Transferred to George Mason

=== Recruiting class ===
College recruiting
Name	Hometown	School	Height	Weight	Commit date
Andra Espinoza-Hunter; G	Ossining, NY	Ossining	5 ft 11 in (1.80 m)	N/A	
Andra Espinoza-Hunter; G	Recruit ratings: ESPN: (98)				
Megan Walker; G/F	Chesterfield, VA	Monacan	6 ft 1 in (1.85 m)	N/A	
Megan Walker; G/F	Recruit ratings: ESPN: (98)				
Mikayla Coombs; G	Buford, GA	Wesleyan	5 ft 8 in (1.73 m)	N/A	
Mikayla Coombs; G	Recruit ratings: ESPN: (98)				
Alexis Gordon; G/F	Fort Worth, TX	L. D. Bell	6 ft 0 in (1.83 m)	N/A	
Alexis Gordon; G/F	Recruit ratings: ESPN: (97)				
Overall recruit ranking:
Note: In many cases, Scout, Rivals, 247Sports, On3, and ESPN may conflict in their listings of height and weight.; In these cases, the average was taken. ESPN grades are on a 100-point scale.; Sources: "2017 Player Commits". ESPN. Archived from the original on August 12, 2017.

=== FIBA ===
Kia Nurse participated on the Canada women's national basketball team in the 2017 FIBA Women's AmeriCup event. This is a tournament that takes place every other year between the national teams of the two continents. It also serves as a qualifying tournament for the Olympic games. In the gold-medal game against the host team Argentina, the Canadians were behind by seven points at halftime, but they came back in the second half. Nurse had a basket with just over a minute left, to give Canada the lead and the gold medal.

=== FIBA U19 ===
Megan Walker, Crystal Dangerfield, and Christyn Williams (Central Arkansas Christian Schools, with a verbal commitment to Connecticut) participated on the United States women's national under-19 basketball team which competed in the FIBA Under-19 Women's Basketball World Cup, held in Udine, Italy in July. The USA team faced an undefeated Russia in the gold medal game, but fell short, losing 86–82. Dangerfield scored 15 points in the final, which resulted in the silver medal for the USA. For the entire event, Dangerfield averaged 9.0 points per game, Walker averaged 7.6 and Williams averaged 3.2.

=== 3x3 U18 ===
Christyn Williams was one of four players selected to represent the US in the FIBA 3x3 U18 World Cup held in Chengdu, China in June and July. She scored 22 points over the course of the seven games to help the USA win all seven games, including the gold-medal game against the Czech Republic.

== Roster ==
2017–18 Connecticut Huskies women's basketball team
Players
Coaches

Pos.	#	Name	Height	Year	Previous school	Hometown
G	2	Andra Espinoza-Hunter	5 ft 11 in (1.8 m)	Fr	Ossining	Ossining, NY
G/F	3	Megan Walker	6 ft 1 in (1.85 m)	Fr	Monacan	Chesterfield, VA
G	4	Mikayla Coombs	5 ft 8 in (1.73 m)	Fr	Wesleyan	Buford, GA
G	5	Crystal Dangerfield	5 ft 5 in (1.65 m)	So	Blackman	Murfreesboro, TN
G	10	Molly Bent	5 ft 9 in (1.75 m)	So	Tabor Academy	Centerville, MA
G	11	Kia Nurse	6 ft 0 in (1.83 m)	Sr	St. Thomas More	Hamilton, ON
F	15	Gabby Williams	5 ft 11 in (1.8 m)	Sr	Reed	Sparks, NV
G/F	23	Azurá Stevens	6 ft 6 in (1.98 m)	RS Jr	Duke	Raleigh, NC
F	24	Napheesa Collier	6 ft 1 in (1.85 m)	Jr	Incarnate Word Academy	O'Fallon, MO
F	25	Kyla Irwin	6 ft 2 in (1.88 m)	So	State College	State College, PA
F	32	Batouly Camara	6 ft 2 in (1.88 m)	RS So	Kentucky	New York, NY
G/F	33	Katie Lou Samuelson	6 ft 3 in (1.91 m)	Jr	Mater Dei	Huntington Beach, CA
G/F	34	Alexis Gordon	6 ft 0 in (1.83 m)	Fr	L. D. Bell	Fort Worth, TX

Head coach

- Geno Auriemma (West Chester)

Assistant coach(es)

- Chris Dailey (Rutgers)
- Shea Ralph (Connecticut)
- Marisa Moseley (Boston University)

Legend

- (C) Team captain
- (S) Suspended
- (I) Ineligible
- (W) Walk-on
- Injured
- Current redshirt

Roster
Last update: 8/12/17

Andra Espinoza-Hunter was only on the roster for the fall semester, after which she transferred from UConn.

== Game summaries ==
=== Exhibition ===
==== Netherlands national team ====
The UConn team took a trip to Italy in August, interspersing visits to historical sites with exhibition games against Dutch, Italian and Slovenian basketball teams. The first game was against the Netherlands national team on August 14, 2017 in Rome, Italy. Collier led the team in points and rebounds with 16 and 11, respectively, helping UConn to a 68–52 in over the national team. Nurse was not present for that game as she was still playing for the Canadian national team in the FIBA AmeriCup tournament.

The next day, the two teams faced off again. Nurse was present for this game and contributed 18 points, although high-scoring honors went to her teammate Samuelson with 23 points. UConn won the game 88–66.

==== Italian All-stars ====
Three days later, UConn took on the Italian All-Stars in Vicenza, Italy. Samuelson repeated her scoring performance with 23 points, while freshman Walker was the leading rebounder with nine. Dangerfield had eight assists with no turnovers. Samuelson scored 15 of her points in the first quarter, helping the team to a 17-point lead. The team continued on to a 103–45 victory.

==== Celje ====
The final exhibition game was held in Trieste against Celje, a Slovenian women's basketball club. UConn held a slim lead at halftime 37–36, playing without Collier, who had injured her ankle in the prior game. However, in the third quarter the Huskies were outscored 25–10 and ended up losing the game 79–59. Samuelson was the high scorer with 17 points but only hit one of her six three-point attempts. The Huskies hit just 32% of their field-goal attempts.

==== Fort Hays State ====
UConn took on Division II Fort Hays State in their first exhibition game at home. The starters were the four returning starters from the previous year, plus Dangerfield. Stevens came in off the bench and recorded 15 points and four blocked shots in the game. Nurse was the leading scorer with 19 points, while both Williams and Collier had nine rebounds each. UConn won the game easily, 82–37.

==== Ashland University ====
The final exhibition game was against Division II Ashland University, who had won the Division II national championship in the prior year and came into the season with a longest winnings streak in the country, at 37 games. Both teams were ranked number one in the preseason polls. Ashland's Laina Snyder had a double double with 12 points and 10 rebounds, while Julie Whorley led the team in scoring with 17 points. For the Huskies, nurse led all scorers with 21 points, hitting all of her seven shots from the field. Stevens and Williams each had double doubles, with Stevens scoring 16 points and pulling down 11 rebounds, while Williams had 11 points and 10 rebounds. UConn won the game 119–56.

=== Regular season ===
==== Stanford ====
The UConn team opened their season on the road, playing in the Countdown to Columbus doubleheader against 10th-ranked Stanford. The Huskies had the good fortune to return three first-team All-Americans (the only team in Division I women's basketball to do so this year). The fourth starter for the team, Nurse, was the starting guard on the Canadian Olympic team. The fifth starter was sophomore Dangerfield, who had a good but uneven freshman year. However, she reached double figures in scoring halfway through the first quarter, and ended up hitting six of seven 3-point shot attempts. The Huskies opened up a 49–14 halftime lead. For the first time in four years, the opening game did not follow a successful national championship bid, so the team potentially could interrupt their back-to-back winning streak extending from 1993 to 1994. That streak was never seriously threatened in this game, as UConn ended up with the win 78–53. This was the 22nd consecutive year that UConn had won their opening game.

==== California ====
UConn played their home opener against 20th-ranked California. The Golden Bears led 4–3 early, but scored 23 of the next 25 points to take control of the game. The Huskies had a 19-point lead at the end of the first quarter, and cruised to an 82–47 win. The team unveiled a banner to honor Rebecca Lobo before the game to reflect her inclusion in the Naismith Hall of Fame in September. Dangerfield, Collier and Nurse shared scoring honors with 14 points each.

==== Maryland ====
The Huskies played their second home game of the season and their first home game at the XL Center against 15th-ranked Maryland. UConn's best shooter, Samuelson, had injured her foot in the prior game, and was not able to play. Despite that, every starter for UConn scored in double figures, led by Nurse with 21 points. This was the first start for Azure Stevens, who had transferred to UConn from Duke and sat out the prior season. She had a double double with 18 points and 12 rebounds. The game was tied early at seven points apiece, but the Huskies went on a 19–2 run to take control. Both teams struggled with ball control, combining for 45 turnovers. The final score, in favor of the Huskies, was 97–72.

==== UCLA ====
UConn headed west to play UCLA, a team near Samuelson's hometown of Huntington Beach, but her foot injury prevented her from playing. She was no longer on crutches and wearing a walking boot, which she could be seen wearing along the sidelines while shouting encouragement to her teammates. Despite playing the number five ranked team in the country, her teammates responded, opening up a 24-point lead at one point and ending with a 78–60 win over the Bruins. The audience of over 9,000 included Kobe Bryant and Ann Myers Drysdale.

==== Michigan State ====
The Huskies headed north on the next step in their West Coast trip to Matthew Knight Arena in Eugene, Oregon to take part in the Nike PK80 invitational. They took on Michigan State, their first unranked opponent of the season, but a team with a 4–1 record. Stevens, who felt she had not performed well against UCLA, stepped up with 25 points, 16 rebounds and five assists to help UConn to a 96–62 win. She also reached the 1,000-point mark for her career, with 938 scored at Duke. UConn held the Spartans to just over 34% shooting from the field, and beat Michigan State 46–18.

==== Nevada ====
UConn had never played the University of Nevada, so the game played at the Lawlor Events Center in Reno was the first time on the court for most players on the team. However, it was familiar ground for Williams, who had led her high school's team to the state title in 2012 in that arena. She also spent time in the arena watching her father and her sister, who both played basketball for Nevada. The game was set up as a homecoming game for the senior Williams. She scored 18 points, although her coach Auriemma emphasized her defensive prowess. Stevens had a double double with 17 points and 14 rebounds, but the offensive star of the team was Nurse, scoring on all eight of her three-point attempts, and ending up with 27 points. This was the first nationally-televised game for Nevada. UConn won 88–57.

==== Notre Dame ====
The game against the third-ranked and undefeated Notre Dame was highly anticipated, resulting in a sellout for the XL center. Connecticut led at the end of the first quarter by four points, but the Irish responded with a 24–4 run to take a seven-point lead into halftime. The third quarter was close, but Notre Dame extended the lead by a single point to enter the fourth quarter with an eight-point lead. UConn's Samuelson had missed the prior four games with her foot injury, but was able to play in this game until the early in the fourth quarter, when she reaggravated her injury and had to leave. Williams was battling a migraine, and ineffective in the first half, when she scored only two points on one of seven shooting and did not play the second half. Despite missing two of the top players, UConn outscored Notre Dame 26-9 in the fourth quarter, ending up with 80–71 victory. Five Huskies scored in double digits. Despite missing most of the fourth quarter, Samuelson was the leading scorer with 18, followed by Stevens with 17.

==== DePaul ====
DePaul chose to have the official opening of their new Wintrust Arena on the night that UConn came to town. The Huskies quickly quashed any notion that the Blue Demons would christen their new arena with a win. Early in the game, UConn went on a 14–2 run, aided by back-to-back three-pointers from Dangerfield to set the tone for the game. Samuelson was cleared to play, and started off slowly, missing several early shots, but she ended up hitting half of her field-goal attempts, to lead the Huskies with 20 points. This was not a one-person show, as six different players scored in double figures. Collier had a double double with 17 points and 10 rebounds. The final score, in favor of the Huskies, was 103–69.

==== Oklahoma ====
UConn faced Oklahoma in a game technically on a neutral court, as it was neither the home court for Connecticut nor Oklahoma, but playing in the Hall of Fame women's Holiday Showcase in Uncasville, Connecticut felt like a home game. The game itself almost seemed like an afterthought, as it represented 1,000 wins for head coach Geno Auriemma, but Oklahoma tried to spoil the celebration. The Huskies had a 15-point lead at halftim. The Sooners cut that deficit to seven points midway through the third quarter, when Connecticut responded with a 13–3 run to build the lead back to 17 points. After the final gun sounded on the 88–64 win, the celebration began. Auriemma was treated to tributes from former players and a Hall of Fame jacket as well as a cake, but he was not expecting to see many members of his inaugural 1985 team in attendance.

The win moved Auriemma into company with two other women's basketball coaches who had reached the 1,000-win mark, including Pat Summitt and Tara VanDerveer. In an odd coincidence, the third member of the club, Sylvia Hatchell, reached the milestone a few hours earlier. Auriemma reached the milestone faster than any other coach doing so, with only 135 losses.

==== Duquesne ====
UConn continued its tradition of scheduling a game near the hometown of seniors by playing Duquesne in Toronto, as a homecoming game for Nurse, who is from Hamilton, Ontario. The game was a sellout, held at the Mattamy Athletic Centre. Nurse hit 9 of 11 field-goal attempts to score 24 points for the Huskies. It was not the first time that Nurse had played in this arena. She played there previously while in high school and when playing for the Canadian national team, when she led the team to a win over the US in the Pan American games. However, it was the first time her grandparents had watched her play wearing a Connecticut jersey. Samuelson scored 33 points, and the Huskies won the game 104–52.

==== Memphis ====
UConn opened conference play with the game against Memphis on the day before New Year's. The start time was 1:30 PM, and the early start made it easy for fans to make it to the game. Just over 12,000, the largest crowd of the year, attended the game. Williams took ten shots and hit every one, to score 20 points. Although Memphis had come into this game with a four-game winning streak, the Huskies won 97–49. They had now won every one of their 83 conference games.

==== East Carolina ====
One game after hitting 10 consecutive shots, Williams hit her first six shots, and ended up hitting eight of nine against East Carolina. Samuelson recorded nine assists, which matched a career high, and Stevens recorded 16 rebounds to also tie a career high. Heather Macy, the coach of East Carolina, said, "UConn dominated every facet". UConn held the Lady Pirates to 25% shooting from the field and won the game 96–35.

==== South Florida ====
Connecticut played the first two games against South Florida with this one played on the Bulls' home court. The UConn offense was solid, with Collier heading 12 of 15 field-goal attempts to record a season-high 25 points. The team hit 50% of their field-goal attempts and reached 100 points for the third time this season. However, the real key to the win was the Huskies' defense. USF's Kitija Laksa was the second-leading scorer in the conference, averaging over 20 points a game, but she was held to zero points. The team as a whole hit under 30% of their field-goal attempts. The final score, in favor of the Huskies, was 100–49.

==== UCF ====
UConn started out very slowly against Central Florida. The Huskies had a 13-point lead at halftime, but the 32 points scored in the first half was the lowest scoring first half of the season. The Knights' physical defense was effective in slowing down Connecticut, and coach Auriemma spent nearly the entire halftime explaining this to the team. They did not return to the court until there were less than 30 seconds left before the start of the third quarter. Whatever was said was effective, as UConn scored 48 points in the second half. Stevens came off the bench to record 19 points to lead the Huskies in scoring. Auriemma praised Williams for "energizing the team in the second half". Her 13 rebounds and five assists helped the Huskies in their third-quarter run. The final score, in favor of Connecticut, was 80–44.

==== Houston ====
Connecticut's defense helped UConn to a 95–35 win over Houston. The Huskies held the Cougars to four points in the first quarter into a season-low 20% shooting percentage for the game. The Huskies were also strong offensively, with Stevens recording a double double (19 points and 10 rebounds), and Samuelson and Nurse each scoring 17 points. This was their 145th consecutive victory over an unranked opponent.

==== Texas ====
UConn found itself in unusual territory—down by double digits in the first quarter. The Longhorns opened up with an 8–2 run to start the game, and expanded the lead to 10 points with a score of 22–12. The Huskies responded, but were still down by three points at the end of the first quarter, the first time in the season they had not held the lead at the end of the first quarter. Texas was still leading as the half wound down, but Dangerfield stole the ball, leading to a Collier basket to give UConn a one-point lead to 39–38. Free throws were critical for the Huskies, who hit their first 15 attempts from the charity stripe. However, Samuelson, usually a very solid free-throw shooter, had taken an inadvertent elbow to the eye earlier in the game, and missed two consecutive shots at the line in the final minute, with UConn only leading by three points. Dangerfield hit two free throws with eight seconds left in the game to seal the 75–71 victory over ninth-ranked Texas.

==== Tulsa ====
UConn hosted Tulsa at home. Although the Huskies were up by 15 points at the end of the first quarter, and had finished the quarter on a 16–0 run, coach Auriemma was so dissatisfied with the play of the team that he replaced all the starters with five bench players to start the second quarter. Each team scored 16 points in the second quarter, the first time in 21 quarters against AAC opponents that UConn failed to outscore the opposition. The starters returned at the beginning of the third quarter, but were able to outscore Tulsa only by two points in that period. Tulsa cut the lead to 10 points with just over five minutes left. Although UConn finished the game with a run to win 78–60, Auriemma described the team effort as "the most disgraceful he's seen in the 32 years he has been coaching Connecticut".

==== Temple ====
UConn played Temple in Philadelphia in a game which featured Auriemma's former assistant, Tonya Cardoza, now head coach of the Temple Owls. Samuelson was unable to play due to an ankle injury, but that did not seem to slow down the Huskies, as Walker recorded a career-high 22 points and Nurse led all scorers with 24 points. The Owls' Mia Davis was noteworthy for scoring 19 points, but that was not close to enough, as UConn went on to win 113–57. UConn's coach Auriemma made a point of pulling aside Temple's Tanaya Atkinson and Davis for words of encouragement.

==== Memphis ====
UConn had several players nursing injuries as they visited Memphis, but they were unlikely to elicit any sympathy, as the Tigers were only able to dress six players. The Huskies were too much for the Tigers, with five players in double figures versus only one for the Tigers. Connecticut won easily, 93–36.

==== Tulane ====
UConn had typically beaten Tulane by wide margins, averaging 44 points in the three meetings before the February 18, 2017 game. However, in the most recent meeting played at Tulane, the game went down to the final possession, with Connecticut winning 63–60. This meeting would end up more like the previous three than the recent close call, with UConn winning 98–45. UConn was up 53–19 at halftime, and then the Huskies really started to hit their shots, going 13 for 14, or almost 93% in the third quarter. Tulane's leading scorer was held to two points. Napheesa Collier was perfect from the field, hitting all six of her shots, one of which was a three pointer. Samuelson led all scorers with 19 points, but she was one of six players with double-digit scoring.

==== South Carolina ====
Facing the defending national champions is an anticipated game, even when a team is currently ranked number one in the nation. An expected capacity crowd of 18,000 showed up to cheer on the Gamecocks, and this game had the potential of being close. Crystal Dangerfield, the starting point guard for UConn, was looking forward to playing against a former teammate Tyasha Harris. Both had played on the FIBA U-19 World Cup in Udine, Italy, where they helped the USA bring home the silver medal.

South Carolina scored the first basket of the game, but the Huskies responded with a 13–2 run, to pull out to a 24–16 lead at the end of the first quarter. The Huskies went on a 17–two run to extend the lead to 23 points. While the crowd was heavily weighted in favor of South Carolina fans, UConn fans were able to make their cheers heard over the silence of the Gamecock fans. The second half was largely more of the same, save a brief 12–0 run by the South Carolina team, but UConn responded, and UConn won 83–58.

==== Cincinnati ====
Following the decisive win over South Carolina, Connecticut returned to conference play against Cincinnati at home. The team started slowly, down 11–9 in early going, before going on a 23–0 run to end the quarter. The game was never close again, as all five Huskies starters scored in double digits, with both Stevens and Williams recording double doubles. The team hit 56.5% of the field-goal attempts and went on to win easily, 106–65.

==== UCF ====
The Huskies were ahead 21–4 at the end of the first quarter. Although UConn extended the lead in the second quarter, Central Florida outscored Connecticut in the second half. UConn ended up with the win 55–37. This was the fewest points scored by the team in six years.

==== Wichita State ====
UConn's game against Wichita State was the first ever meeting between the two opponents. Wichita State had switched from the Missouri Valley conference to the American Athletic Conference in the previous year. The last time Connecticut lost to a first-time opponent was in 1996, before any of the current players were born. However, despite the history, the Shockers were not quite prepared for the Huskies. UConn scored seven points before Wichita State even took a shot, and had the tightest school record with 41 points in the first quarter. They hit 71.6% of their field goal attempts, which was the third best in history, and ended up with their 87th consecutive win against a first-time opponent. The final score was 124–43. Collier scored 26 points on 11 for 13 shooting.

==== Louisville ====
The Cardinals outscored the Huskies in the third and fourth quarters, and were only outscored by two points in the second quarter, but that was not enough to overcome a 24–6 margin by the Huskies in the first quarter. Louisville scored the first three points of the quarter, but UConn then scored 19 consecutive points. The UConn defense held Louisville 20 points under their scoring average. Samuelson played all 40 minutes, scoring 26 points. Williams also played all 40 minutes and pulled down 15 rebounds.

==== Temple ====
Connecticut had six players in double figures as they easily won their game against Temple 106–45. This game represented the 100th win for juniors Samuelson and Collier. Interestingly, the 100th win came in the 101st game. While winning 100 of 101 games is an NCAA record, it only tied a record also held by three other UConn classes.

==== Tulane ====
The Green Wave scored first, hitting a three-pointer on the first shot of the game, but the Huskies responded with a 28–4 run. Stevens ended up with 23 points while Collier scored 22. The Huskies recorded nine blocks while cruising to an easy win 91–47.

==== SMU ====
In their last regular-season road game, UConn played Southern Methodist University. The Mustangs outscored the Huskies in the fourth quarter, and most of the first quarter. UConn did not take the first lead until just over a minute remained in the first quarter. However, following the first media timeout, at which SMU led 12–6, the Huskies scored 43 consecutive points. Only a free throw with 12 seconds left in the quarter prevented the Mustangs from going scoreless in the second quarter, but it was still the fewest points given up by UConn in a quarter since the format switched to quarters three years before. Samuelson was the leading scorer for the Huskies with 23 points, hitting 5 of 8 three-point attempts. The final score was 80–36 in favor of UConn.

== Schedule and results ==
Date time, TV	Rank^{#}	Opponent^{#}	Result	Record	High points	High rebounds	High assists	Site (attendance) city, state
Exhibition
08/14, 2017*; 1:30 pm		Netherlands national team	W 68–52		16 – Collier	11 – Collier	4 – Tied	Pala Fonte Roma Eur; Rome, Italy
08/15, 2017*; 1:30 pm		Netherlands national team	W 88–66		23 – Samuelson	10 – Collier	6 – Dangerfield	Pala Fonte Roma Eur; Rome, Italy
08/18, 2017*; 1:30 pm		Italian All-Stars	W 103–45		23 – Samuelson	9 – Walker	8 – Dangerfield	Pala Goldoni Vicenza; Vicenza, Italy
08/20, 2017*; 1:30 pm		Celje	L 59–79		17 – Samuelson	10 – Walker	6 – Dangerfield	Scuola Elementare Capodistria; Trieste, Italy
November 01, 2017*; 7:00 pm, HuskyVision	No. 1	Fort Hays State	W 82–37		19 – Nurse	9 – Tied	7 – Dangerfield	XL Center (4,651); Hartford, CT
November 05, 2017*; 1:00 pm, HuskyVision	No. 1	Ashland	W 119–56		21 – Nurse	11 – Stevens	7 – Collier	Harry A. Gampel Pavilion (5,622); Storrs, CT
Regular season
November 12, 2017*; 1:30 pm, ESPN	No. 1	vs. No. 10 Stanford; Countdown to Columbus	W 78–53	1–0	24 – Dangerfield	8 – Stevens	4 – Williams	Nationwide Arena (9,711); Columbus, OH
November 17, 2017*; 7:00 pm, SNY	No. 1	No. 20 California	W 82–47	2–0	14 – 3 tied	8 – Williams	5 – Williams	Harry A. Gampel Pavilion (8,103); Storrs, CT
November 19, 2017*; 1:30 pm, ESPN	No. 1	No. 15 Maryland	W 97–72	3–0	21 – Nurse	12 – Stevens	6 – Dangerfield	XL Center (10,126); Hartford, CT
November 21, 2017*; 10:30 pm, ESPNU	No. 1	at No. 5 UCLA	W 78–60	4–0	23 – Collier	11 – Williams	4 – 4 tied	Pauley Pavilion (9,263); Los Angeles, CA
November 25, 2017*; 3:00 pm, SNY	No. 1	vs. Michigan State; Nike PK 80 Phil Knight Invitational	W 96–62	5–0	25 – Stevens	16 – Stevens	10 – Dangerfield	Matthew Knight Arena (6,033); Eugene, OR
November 28, 2017*; 9:00 pm, CBSSN	No. 1	at Nevada	W 88–57	6–0	27 – Nurse	14 – Stevens	5 – Tied	Lawlor Events Center (7,815); Reno, NV
December 03, 2017*; 4:00 pm, ESPN	No. 1	No. 3 Notre Dame; Jimmy V Classic/Rivalry	W 80–71	7–0	18 – Samuelson	9 – Collier	5 – Tied	XL Center (15,564); Hartford, CT
December 08, 2017*; 7:00 pm, FS1	No. 1	at DePaul	W 103–69	8–0	20 – Samuelson	10 – Tied	9 – Dangerfield	Wintrust Arena (3,229); Chicago, IL
December 19, 2017*; 7:00 pm, CBSSN	No. 1	vs. Oklahoma; Hall of Fame Holiday Showcase	W 88–64	9–0	21 – Collier	10 – Williams	8 – Williams	Mohegan Sun Arena (9,151); Uncasville, CT
December 22, 2017*; 7:00 pm, SNY	No. 1	vs. Duquesne	W 104–52	10–0	33 – Samuelson	8 – Tied	6 – Tied	Mattamy Athletic Centre (3,000); Toronto, ON
December 31, 2017; 1:30 pm, SNY	No. 1	Memphis	W 97–49	11–0 (1–0)	20 – Williams	9 – Tied	7 – Williams	XL Center (12,261); Hartford, CT
January 03, 2018; 2:00 pm, SNY	No. 1	at East Carolina	W 96–35	12–0 (2–0)	19 – Samuelson	16 – Stevens	9 – Samuelson	Williams Arena (1,823); Greenville, NC
January 06, 2018; 7:00 pm, SNY	No. 1	at South Florida	W 100–49	13–0 (3–0)	25 – Collier	11 – Collier	6 – Williams	USF Sun Dome (6,659); Tampa, FL
January 09, 2018; 7:00 pm, SNY	No. 1	UCF	W 80–44	14–0 (4–0)	19 – Stevens	13 – Williams	5 – Williams	Harry A. Gampel Pavilion (5,482); Storrs, CT
January 13, 2018; 3:00 pm, SNY	No. 1	at Houston	W 95–35	15–0 (5–0)	19 – Stevens	10 – Stevens	5 – Samuelson	H&PE Arena (2,150); Houston, TX
January 15, 2018*; 7:00 pm, ESPN2	No. 1	at No. 9 Texas	W 75–71	16–0	19 – Samuelson	11 – Williams	6 – Williams	Frank Erwin Center (11,877); Austin, TX
January 18, 2018; 7:00 pm, SNY	No. 1	Tulsa	W 78–60	17–0 (6–0)	22 – Stevens	8 – Collier	5 – Williams	Harry A. Gampel Pavilion (7,477); Storrs, CT
January 21, 2018; 1:00 pm, ESPN2	No. 1	at Temple	W 113–57	18–0 (7–0)	24 – Nurse	8 – Collier	11 – Williams	McGonigle Hall (3,392); Philadelphia, PA
January 24, 2018; 1:00 pm, SNY	No. 1	at Memphis	W 93–36	19–0 (8–0)	19 – Collier	12 – Collier	6 – Nurse	Elma Roane Fieldhouse (2,313); Memphis, TN
January 27, 2018; 12:00 pm, SNY	No. 1	Tulane	W 98–45	20–0 (9–0)	19 – Samuelson	7 – Tied	9 – Williams	Harry A. Gampel Pavilion (10,167); Storrs, CT
February 01, 2018*; 7:00 pm, ESPN	No. 1	at No. 7 South Carolina	W 83–58	21–0	23 – Nurse	14 – Williams	5 – Williams	Colonial Life Arena (18,000); Columbia, SC
February 04, 2018; 1:00 pm, SNY	No. 1	Cincinnati	W 106–65	22–0 (10–0)	25 – Collier	10 – Tied	7 – Tied	XL Center (12,342); Hartford, CT
February 07, 2018; 7:00 pm, SNY	No. 1	at UCF	W 55–37	23–0 (11–0)	19 – Samuelson	12 – Collier	8 – Williams	CFE Arena (6,155); Orlando, FL
February 10, 2018; 1:00 pm, SNY	No. 1	Wichita State	W 124–43	24–0 (12–0)	26 – Collier	7 – Williams	9 – Samuelson	XL Center (11,343); Hartford, CT
February 12, 2018*; 7:00 pm, ESPN2	No. 1	No. 4 Louisville	W 69–58	25–0	26 – Samuelson	15 – Williams	6 – Williams	Harry A. Gampel Pavilion (10,167); Storrs, CT
February 18, 2018; 2:00 pm, CBSSN	No. 1	Temple	W 106–45	26–0 (13–0)	27 – Samuelson	8 – Tied	5 – 3 tied	XL Center (13,110); Hartford, CT
February 21, 2018; 8:00 pm, SNY	No. 1	at Tulane	W 91–47	27–0 (14–0)	23 – Stevens	9 – Samuelson	7 – Samuelson	Devlin Fieldhouse (1,655); New Orleans, LA
February 24, 2018; 6:00 pm, SNY	No. 1	at SMU	W 80–36	28–0 (15–0)	23 – Samuelson	14 – Stevens	5 – 2 tied	Moody Coliseum (6,981); Dallas, TX
February 26, 2018; 7:00 pm, ESPN2	No. 1	No. 20 South Florida	W 82–53	29–0 (16–0)	21 – Stevens	11 – Collier	9 – Williams	Harry A. Gampel Pavilion (9,115); Storrs, CT
AAC women's tournament
March 04, 2018; 6:30 pm, ESPNU	(1) No. 1	vs. (9) Tulane; Quarterfinals	W 82–56	30–0	21 – Samuelson	9 – Stevens	5 – Collier	Mohegan Sun Arena (6,804); Uncasville, CT
March 05, 2018; 7:00 pm, ESPN2	(1) No. 1	vs. (4) Cincinnati; Semifinals	W 75–21	31–0	21 – Stevens	13 – Stevens	6 – Samuelson	Mohegan Sun Arena (6,033); Uncasville, CT
March 06, 2018; 5:00 pm, ESPN2	(1) No. 1	vs. (2) No. 19 South Florida; Championship game	W 70–54	32–0	19 – Williams	7 – Tied	6 – Tied	Mohegan Sun Arena (7,501); Uncasville, CT
NCAA women's tournament
March 17, 2018*; 11:00 am, ESPN2	(1 A) No. 1	(16 A) Saint Francis (PA); First round	W 140–52	33–0	26 – Stevens	10 – Tied	10 – Samuelson	Harry A. Gampel Pavilion (6,154); Storrs, CT
March 19, 2018*; 6:30 pm, ESPN2	(1 A) No. 1	(9 A) Quinnipiac; Second round	W 71–46	34–0	23 – Collier	8 – Tied	5 – Tied	Harry A. Gampel Pavilion (8,957); Storrs, CT
March 24, 2018*; 1:30 pm, ESPN	(1 A) No. 1	vs. (5 A) No. 20 Duke; Sweet Sixteen	W 72–59	35–0	16 – Collier	12 – Stevens	6 – Williams	Times Union Center (10,658); Albany, NY
March 26, 2018*; 7:00 pm, ESPN	(1 A) No. 1	vs. (2 A) No. 7 South Carolina; Elite Eight	W 94–65	36–0	23 – Williams	7 – Collier	7 – Samuelson	Times Union Center (9,522); Albany, NY
March 30, 2018*; 9:00 pm, ESPN2	(1 A) No. 1	vs. (1 S) No. 5 Notre Dame; Final Four/Rivalry	L 89–91 ^{OT}	36–1	24 – Collier	10 – Williams	7 – Williams	Nationwide Arena (19,564); Columbus, OH
*Non-conference game. ^{#}Rankings from AP Poll. (#) Tournament seedings in parentheses. A=Albany Region. All times are in EST.

== Rankings ==
Regular season polls
Poll	Pre- season	Week 2	Week 3	Week 4	Week 5	Week 6	Week 7	Week 8	Week 9	Week 10	Week 11	Week 12	Week 13	Week 14	Week 15	Week 16	Week 17	Week 18	Week 19	Final
AP	1	1	1	1	1	1	1	1	1	1	1	1	1	1	1	1	1	1	1	N/A
Coaches	1	N/A	1	1	1	1	1	1	1	1	1	1	1	1	1	1	1	1	1	3

Legend
	Increase in ranking
	Decrease in ranking
	Not ranked previous week
(RV)	Received votes

== Media ==
Every single Connecticut game was expected to be televised. Excluding exhibitions, most Connecticut games aired on SNY, an ESPN network, or a CBS network. Exhibition games and games that aired on SNY were also streamed on Husky Vision. Every game was expected to be broadcast on the UConn IMG Sports, Network with an extra audio broadcast available online to listen to through Husky Vision.
