= 2017–18 Houston Cougars women's basketball team =

Intercollegiate basketball season

2017–18 Houston Cougars women's basketball

WNIT, First Round
- Conference: American Athletic Conference
- Record: 20–12 (9–7 The American)
- Head coach: Ronald Hughey (4th season)
- Assistant coaches: Tai Dillard; Victoria Picott; Jamila Ganter
- Home arena: H&PE Arena

2017–18 American Athletic Conference women's basketball standings
	Conf.				Overall
Team	W		L	PCT	W		L	PCT
No. 1 UConn †	16	–	0	1.000	36	–	1	.973
No. 19 South Florida	13	–	3	.813	26	–	8	.765
UCF	12	–	4	.750	22	–	11	.667
Cincinnati	10	–	6	.625	19	–	13	.594
Houston	9	–	7	.563	20	–	12	.625
Wichita State	9	–	7	.563	14	–	17	.452
East Carolina	7	–	9	.438	16	–	15	.516
Tulane	5	–	11	.313	14	–	17	.452
Memphis	5	–	11	.313	10	–	20	.333
SMU	4	–	12	.250	10	–	20	.333
Temple	3	–	13	.188	12	–	19	.387
Tulsa	3	–	13	.188	10	–	21	.323
† 2018 American Tournament winner As of 30 March 2018; Rankings from AP poll

The 2017–18 Houston Cougars women's basketball team represented the University of Houston during the 2017–18 NCAA Division I women's basketball season. This was the Cougars' fifth season as members of the American Athletic Conference. The Cougars, led by fourth-year head coach Ronald Hughey, played their home games at Health and Physical Education Arena due to renovations at Hofheinz Pavilion, which was to be renamed Fertitta Center, and would reopen during the 2018–19 season. They finished the season 20–12, 9–7 in The American play to finish in a tie for fifth place. They lost to Tulsa in the first round of the American Athletic Conference women's tournament. They received an at-large bid to the Women's National Invitation Tournament, where they lost to South Dakota.

== Media ==
All Cougars games home and away are aired on the Houston Cougars IMG Sports Network, streamed online via the Houston Portal, with Gerald Sanchez and Louis Ray on the call. Before conference season home games streamed on Houston All-Access. Conference home games rotated between ESPN3, AAC Digital, and the Houston Portal. Road games typically were streamed on the opponents' websites, though some conference road games also appeared on ESPN3 or AAC Digital.

== Roster ==
2017–18 Houston Cougars women's basketball team
Players
Coaches

Pos.	#	Name	Height	Year	Previous school	Hometown
G	0	Angela Harris	5 ft 6 in (1.68 m)	So	Cy-Fair HS	Cypress, TX
G	1	Chyanne Butler	5 ft 6 in (1.68 m)	Sr	Junípero Serra HS; USC	Costa Mesa, CA
F	2	Octavia Barnes	5 ft 10 in (1.78 m)	Jr	Raymond HS; Hinds CC	Jackson, MS
F	3	Dorian Branch	5 ft 10 in (1.78 m)	So	Richardson HS	Dallas, TX
G	4	Jasmyne Harris	5 ft 8 in (1.73 m)	So	Brazosport HS	Freeport, TX
G	5	Dionna Collins	5 ft 5 in (1.65 m)	Sr	Del City; Redlands CC	Del City, OK
F	12	Alyssa Okoene (redshirt)	6 ft 2 in (1.88 m)	So	North Shore; North Carolina	Houston, TX
G	14	Quatera Limbrick	5 ft 6 in (1.68 m)	So	Episcopal HS	Sugar Land, TX
F	22	Myyah West	6 ft 0 in (1.83 m)	Jr	Prentiss HS; Jones County JC	Prentiss, MS
G	23	Serithia Hawkins	5 ft 11 in (1.8 m)	Jr	Southmoore	Moore, OK
G	24	Mariah Mitchell	5 ft 9 in (1.75 m)	Sr	McKinney	McKinney, TX
C	32	Sharayla Brown	6 ft 3 in (1.91 m)	Jr	East Central	Tulsa, OK
G	33	Juila Blackshell-Fair	5 ft 10 in (1.78 m)	Fr	Vanden	Fairfield, CA
F	44	Kaila Chizer	5 ft 11 in (1.8 m)	Sr	Pearland HS; Texas A&M-Kingsville	Pearland, TX

Head coach

- Ronald Hughey (Limestone College)

Assistant coach(es)

- Tai Dillard (Texas)
- Victoria Picott (Rutgers)
- Jamila Ganter (Texas A&M)

Legend

- (C) Team captain
- (S) Suspended
- (I) Ineligible
- (W) Walk-on
- Injured
- Current redshirt

Roster
Last update: October 9, 2017

== Schedule and results ==
Date time, TV	Rank^{#}	Opponent^{#}	Result	Record	Site (attendance) city, state
Non-conference regular season
11/10/2017*; 7:00 pm		at No. 20 Texas A&M; Preseason WNIT First Round	L 65–83	0–1	Reed Arena (3,085); College Station, TX
11/17/2017*; 5:00 pm		vs. Milwaukee; Preseason WNIT Consolation 2nd Round	W 74–59	1–1	Lakefront Arena; New Orleans, LA
11/18/2017*; 4:30 pm		at New Orleans; Preseason WNIT Consolation 2nd Round	W 78–66	2–1	Lakefront Arena (382); New Orleans, LA
11/22/2017*; 5:00 pm		at Boston College	L 74–79	2–2	Conte Forum (891); Chestnut Hill, MA
11/24/2017*; 2:00 pm		vs. Liberty; UMass Thanksgiving Classic	W 75–68	3–2	Mullins Center (387); Amherst, MA
11/25/2017*; 10:00 am		vs. Northeastern; UMass Thanksgiving Classic	W 72–64	4–2	Mullins Center (396); Amherst, MA
11/28/2017*; 7:00 pm		at Texas State	W 72–67	5–2	Strahan Coliseum (1,192); San Marcos, TX
12/01/2017*; 7:00 pm		at Texas–Arlington	W 62–58	6–2	College Park Center (761); Arlington, TX
12/03/2017*; 2:00 pm		Texas Tech	W 79–75	7–2	H&PE Arena; Houston, TX
12/10/2017*; 2:00 pm		East Tennessee State	W 88–69	8–2	H&PE Arena (561); Houston, TX
12/16/2017*; 5:00 pm		at Rutgers	L 57–75	8–3	Louis Brown Athletic Center (1,220); Piscataway, NJ
12/18/2017*; 11:00 am		Incarnate Word	W 98–67	9–3	H&PE Arena (260); Houston, TX
12/21/2017*; 7:00 pm		George Mason	W 82–73	10–3	H&PE Arena (467); Houston, TX
12/28/2017*; 5:00 pm		Columbia	W 77–53	11–3	H&PE Arena (522); Houston, TX
AAC regular season
12/30/2017; 2:00 pm		at SMU	W 85–75	12–3 (1–0)	Moody Coliseum (992); Dallas, TX
01/02/2018; 7:00 pm		Wichita State	W 73–55	13–3 (2–0)	HP&E Arena (652); Houston, TX
01/06/2018; 2:00 pm		at Tulane	W 98–92 ^{OT}	14–3 (3–0)	Devlin Fieldhouse (642); New Orleans, LA
01/10/2018; 7:00 pm, ESPN3		Cincinnati	L 82–88	14–4 (3–1)	HP&E Arena (542); Houston, TX
01/13/2018; 2:00 pm, SNY/ESPN3		No. 1 Connecticut	L 35–95	14–5 (3–2)	HP&E Arena (2,150); Houston, TX
01/16/2018; 6:00 pm, ESPN3		at Temple	W 99–75	15–5 (4–2)	McGonigle Hall (1,008); Philadelphia, PA
01/20/2018; 4:00 pm		at East Carolina	L 78–80 ^{OT}	15–6 (4–3)	Williams Arena (1,227); Greenville, NC
01/27/2018; 2:00 pm		SMU	W 60–56	16–6 (5–3)	H&PE Arena (746); Houston, TX
01/31/2018; 7:00 pm		Tulane	W 72–48	17–6 (6–3)	HP&E Arena (575); Houston, TX
02/03/2018; 2:00 pm, ADN		at Wichita State	W 73–62	18–6 (7–3)	Charles Koch Arena (1,907); Wichita, KS
02/07/2018; 7:00 pm, ADN		Memphis	W 66–55	19–6 (8–3)	HP&E Arena (577); Houston, TX
02/10/2018; 2:00 pm		at Tulsa	L 77–83	19–7 (8–4)	Reynolds Center (470); Tulsa, OK
02/17/2018; 2:00 pm		East Carolina	W 97–81	20–7 (9–4)	HP&E Arena (667); Houston, TX
02/21/2018; 2:00 pm		at No. 18 South Florida	L 65–81	20–8 (9–5)	USF Sun Dome (2,223); Tampa, FL
02/24/2018; 12:00 pm, ADN		UCF	L 59–64	20–9 (9–6)	HP&E Arena (1,099); Houston, TX
02/26/2018; 6:00 pm		at Cincinnati	L 57–61	20–10 (9–7)	Saint Ursula Academy Gym (643); Cincinnati, OH
AAC Women's Tournament
03/03/2018; 7:00 pm, ESPN3	(5)	vs. (12) Tulsa; First Round	L 72–98	20–11	Mohegan Sun Arena (4,599); Uncasville, CT
WNIT
03/15/2018*; 7:00 pm		at South Dakota; First Round	L 58–65	20–12	Sanford Coyote Sports Center (1,176); Vermillion, SD
*Non-conference game. ^{#}Rankings from AP Poll. (#) Tournament seedings in parentheses. All times are in Central Time.

== Rankings ==
Regular season polls
Poll	Pre- season	Week 2	Week 3	Week 4	Week 5	Week 6	Week 7	Week 8	Week 9	Week 10	Week 11	Week 12	Week 13	Week 14	Week 15	Week 16	Week 17	Week 18	Week 19	Final
AP																				N/A
Coaches		N/A									RV				RV	RV				

Legend
	Increase in ranking
	Decrease in ranking
	Not ranked previous week
(RV)	Received votes

== See also ==
- 2017–18 Houston Cougars men's basketball team
