= 2018 American Athletic Conference women's basketball tournament =

- Tournament Logo
- Classification: Division I
- Season: 2017–18
- Teams: 12
- Site: Mohegan Sun Arena; Uncasville, Connecticut
- Champions: Connecticut (5th title)
- Winning coach: Geno Auriemma (5th title)
- MVP: Azurá Stevens (Connecticut)
- Attendance: 29,709
- Television: ESPNU, ESPN2, ESPN3

2017–18 American Athletic Conference women's basketball standings
	Conf.				Overall
Team	W		L	PCT	W		L	PCT
No. 1 UConn †	16	–	0	1.000	36	–	1	.973
No. 19 South Florida	13	–	3	.813	26	–	8	.765
UCF	12	–	4	.750	22	–	11	.667
Cincinnati	10	–	6	.625	19	–	13	.594
Houston	9	–	7	.563	20	–	12	.625
Wichita State	9	–	7	.563	14	–	17	.452
East Carolina	7	–	9	.438	16	–	15	.516
Tulane	5	–	11	.313	14	–	17	.452
Memphis	5	–	11	.313	10	–	20	.333
SMU	4	–	12	.250	10	–	20	.333
Temple	3	–	13	.188	12	–	19	.387
Tulsa	3	–	13	.188	10	–	21	.323
† 2018 American Tournament winner As of 30 March 2018; Rankings from AP poll

The 2018 American Athletic Conference women's basketball tournament was a postseason tournament that was held March 3–6 in the Mohegan Sun Arena in Uncasville, Connecticut. Connecticut, the winner of the American Athletic Tournament, earned an automatic bid to the 2018 NCAA Division I women's basketball tournament.

== Seeds ==
All the teams in the American Athletic Conference will qualify for the tournament. Teams are seeded based on conference record, and then a tiebreaker system will be used. Teams seeded 5–12 play in the opening round, and teams seeded 1–4 received a bye to the quarterfinals.

Seed	School	Conference	Overall	Tiebreaker
1	Connecticut ‡	16–0	29–0	
2	South Florida #	13–3	24–6	
3	UCF #	12–4	20–9	
4	Cincinnati #	10–6	18–11	
5	Houston	9–7	20–10	2–0 vs. WSU
6	Wichita State	9–7	14–16	0–2 vs. HOU
7	East Carolina	7–9	15–15	
8	Memphis	5–11	10–19	1–0 vs. TUL
9	Tulane	5–11	13–16	0–1 vs. MEM
10	SMU	4–12	11–18	
11	Temple	3–13	11–18	1–0 vs. TULSA
12	Tulsa	3–13	9–20	0–1 vs. TEMPLE
‡ – American Athletic Conference regular season champions. # – Received a first-round bye in the conference tournament. Overall record are as of the end of the regular season.

== Schedule ==
All tournament games are nationally televised on an ESPN network:

Session	Game	Time*	Matchup^{#}	Score	Television	Attendance
First round – Saturday, March 3
1	1	12:00 PM	No. 11 Temple vs. No. 6 Wichita State	72–59	ESPN3	1,380
1	2	2:00 PM	No. 10 SMU vs. No. 7 East Carolina	74–85	ESPN3	1,380
2	3	6:00 PM	No. 9 Tulane vs. No. 8 Memphis	76–64	ESPN3	4,599
2	4	8:00 PM	No. 12 Tulsa vs. No. 5 Houston	98–72	ESPN3	4,599
Quarterfinals – Sunday, March 4
3	5	12:00 PM	No. 11 Temple vs. No. 3 UCF	70–77	ESPN3	3,392
3	6	2:30 PM	No. 7 East Carolina vs. No. 2 South Florida	44–80	ESPNU	3,392
4	7	6:30 PM	No. 9 Tulane vs. No. 1 Connecticut	56–82	ESPNU	6,804
4	8	8:30 PM	No. 12 Tulsa vs. No. 4 Cincinnati	65–66	ESPN3	6,804
Semifinals – Monday, March 5
5	9	4:30 PM	No. 3 UCF vs. No. 2 South Florida	59–74	ESPNU	6,033
5	10	7:00 PM	No. 4 Cincinnati vs. No. 1 Connecticut	21–75	ESPN2	6,033
Championship – Tuesday, March 6
6	11	5:00 PM	No. 2 South Florida vs. No. 1 Connecticut	54–70	ESPN2	7,501
*Game times in ET. #-Rankings denote tournament seeding.

== Bracket ==
First round Saturday, March 3
8	Memphis	64
9	Tulane	76
5	Houston	72
12	Tulsa	98
7	East Carolina	85
10	SMU	74
6	Wichita State	59
11	Temple	72

Quarterfinals; Sunday, March 4
1	Connecticut	82
9	Tulane	56
4	Cincinnati	66
12	Tulsa	65
2	South Florida	80
7	East Carolina	44
3	UCF	77
11	Temple	70

Semifinals; Monday, March 5
1	Connecticut	75
4	Cincinnati	21
2	South Florida	74
3	UCF	59

Championship game Tuesday, March 6
1	Connecticut	70
2	South Florida	54

Note: * denotes overtime

== See also ==
- 2018 American Athletic Conference men's basketball tournament
