= 2017–18 Memphis Tigers women's basketball team =

Intercollegiate basketball season

2017–18 Memphis Tigers women's basketball
- Conference: American Athletic Conference
- Record: 10–20 (5–11 The American)
- Head coach: Melissa McFerrin (10th season)
- Assistant coaches: Danielle O'Banion; Jessica Bogia; Nitra Perry
- Home arena: Elma Roane Fieldhouse

2017–18 American Athletic Conference women's basketball standings
	Conf.				Overall
Team	W		L	PCT	W		L	PCT
No. 1 UConn †	16	–	0	1.000	36	–	1	.973
No. 19 South Florida	13	–	3	.813	26	–	8	.765
UCF	12	–	4	.750	22	–	11	.667
Cincinnati	10	–	6	.625	19	–	13	.594
Houston	9	–	7	.563	20	–	12	.625
Wichita State	9	–	7	.563	14	–	17	.452
East Carolina	7	–	9	.438	16	–	15	.516
Tulane	5	–	11	.313	14	–	17	.452
Memphis	5	–	11	.313	10	–	20	.333
SMU	4	–	12	.250	10	–	20	.333
Temple	3	–	13	.188	12	–	19	.387
Tulsa	3	–	13	.188	10	–	21	.323
† 2018 American Tournament winner As of 30 March 2018; Rankings from AP poll

The 2017–18 Memphis Tigers women's basketball team represented the University of Memphis during the 2017–18 NCAA Division I women's basketball season. The season marked the fifth for the Tigers as members of the American Athletic Conference. The Tigers, led by tenth year head coach Melissa McFerrin, played their home games at the Elma Roane Fieldhouse. They finished the season 10–20, 5–11 in AAC play to finish in a tie for eighth place. They lost in the first round of the American Athletic women's tournament to Tulane.

== Media ==
All Tigers home games will have a radio broadcast live on WUMR. Video streaming for all home games will be available on the Memphis Tiger Network, ESPN3, or AAC Digital. Road games will typically be streamed on the opponents website, though conference road games could also appear on ESPN3 or AAC Digital.

== Roster ==
2017–18 Memphis Tigers women's basketball team
Players
Coaches

Pos.	#	Name	Height	Year	Previous school	Hometown
G	0	Jada Stinson	5 ft 8 in (1.73 m)	Fr	Elizabethtown	Elizabethtown, KY
G	1	Breigha Wilder-Cochran	5 ft 9 in (1.75 m)	RS Sr	Hoover	Hoover, AL
G	4	Finess Dickson	5 ft 6 in (1.68 m)	Fr	Homewood Flossmoor	Homewood, IL
G	5	Brea Elmore	5 ft 9 in (1.75 m)	Sr	Redan	Stone Mountain, GA
F	10	Cheyenne Creighton	6 ft 1 in (1.85 m)	Sr	Blessed Pope John Paul II	Pickering, ON
G	15	Taylor Barnes	5 ft 8 in (1.73 m)	So	Saint Benedict at Auburndale	Memphis, TN
F	20	Manaya Jones (redshirt)	6 ft 4 in (1.93 m)	So	Raleigh-Egypt; Old Dominion	Memphis, TN
G	23	Alyssa Dean	5 ft 8 in (1.73 m)	RS Fr	Centennial HS	Columbus, OH
C	25	Brianna Porter	6 ft 3 in (1.91 m)	Jr	University School of Nashville	Nashville, TN
F	33	Alana Davis	6 ft 2 in (1.88 m)	Fr	Cross Creek	Augusta, GA
F	34	Ashia Jones	6 ft 1 in (1.85 m)	RS Sr	Covington; Tennessee–Martin	Covington, TN
F	35	Jasmine James	6 ft 1 in (1.85 m)	Jr	San Jacinto	Innisfil, ON
G	40	Damonique Miller	5 ft 11 in (1.8 m)	RS Jr	Joe T. Robinson	Little Rock, AR

Head coach

- Melissa McFerrin (Missouri)

Assistant coach(es)

- Danielle O'Banion (Boston College)
- Jessica Bogia (Lafayette)
- Nitra Perry (Mississippi State)

Legend

- (C) Team captain
- (S) Suspended
- (I) Ineligible
- (W) Walk-on
- Injured
- Current redshirt

Roster
Last update: October 9, 2017

== Schedule and results ==
Date time, TV	Rank^{#}	Opponent^{#}	Result	Record	Site (attendance) city, state
Exhibition
11/04/2017*; 12:00 pm		Christian Brothers	W 83–50		Elma Roane Fieldhouse; Memphis, TN
Non-conference regular season
11/10/2017*; 7:00 pm		Tennessee State	W 79–75	1–0	Elma Roane Fieldhouse (1,024); Memphis, TN
11/12/2017*; 3:00 pm		at Little Rock	L 57–86	1–1	Jack Stephens Center (1,386); Little Rock, AR
11/16/2017*; 6:30 pm		at Louisiana Tech	L 40–65	1–2	Thomas Assembly Center (1,851); Ruston, LA
11/19/2017*; 2:00 pm		Southern Illinois	L 56–68	1–3	Elma Roane Fieldhouse (440); Memphis, TN
11/23/2017*; 5:00 pm		vs. No. 9 Ohio State; Play4Kay Shootout Quarterfinals	L 69–100	1–4	Mandalay Bay Events Center; Paradise, NV
11/24/2017*; 2:30 pm		vs. DePaul; Play4Kay Shootout Consolation 2nd round	L 67–81	1–5	Mandalay Bay Events Center; Paradise, NV
11/25/2017*; 2:30 pm		vs. Kent State; Play4Kay Shootout 7th place game	L 55–70	1–6	Mandalay Bay Events Center; Paradise, NV
11/29/2017*; 6:00 pm		IUPUI	L 57–80	1–7	Elma Roane Fieldhouse (508); Memphis, TN
12/03/2017*; 2:00 pm		Illinois	L 47–63	1–8	Elma Roane Fieldhouse (553); Memphis, TN
12/09/2017*; 3:00 pm		UAB	W 64–62	2–8	Elma Roane Fieldhouse (835); Memphis, TN
12/16/2017*; 6:00 pm		at Vanderbilt	W 71–60	3–8	Memorial Gymnasium (2,495); Nashville, TN
12/19/2017*; 6:00 pm		Jackson State	W 64–53	4–8	Elma Roane Fieldhouse (478); Memphis, TN
12/21/2017*; 12:00 pm		Grambling State	W 57–48	5–8	Elma Roane Fieldhouse (438); Memphis, TN
AAC regular season
12/31/2017; 12:30 pm, SNY/ESPN3		at No. 1 Connecticut	L 49–97	5–9 (0–1)	XL Center (12,261); Hartford, CT
01/06/2018; 12:00 pm		East Carolina	W 72–36	6–9 (1–1)	Elma Roma Fieldhouse (376); Memphis, TN
01/10/2018; 7:00 pm		at Wichita State	L 61–69	6–10 (1–2)	Charles Koch Arena (1,176); Wichita, KS
01/13/2018; 7:00 pm		at Tulsa	W 69–48	7–10 (2–2)	Reynolds Center (278); Tulsa, OK
01/17/2018; 7:00 pm, ESPN3		South Florida	L 62–81	7–11 (2–3)	Elma Roane Fieldhouse (454); Memphis, TN
01/21/2018; 2:00 pm		at Cincinnati	L 53–64	7–12 (2–4)	Saint Ursula Academy Gym (503); Cincinnati, OH
01/24/2018; 12:00 pm, SNY/ESPN3		No. 1 Connecticut	L 36–93	7–13 (2–5)	Elma Roane Fieldhouse (2,313); Memphis, TN
01/27/2018; 1:00 pm		Wichita State	L 64–77	7–14 (2–6)	Elma Roma Fieldhouse (457); Memphis, TN
02/03/2018; 1:00 pm		at UCF	L 41–61	7–15 (2–7)	CFE Arena (3,388); Orlando, FL
02/07/2018; 7:00 pm, ADN		at Houston	L 55–66	7–16 (2–8)	H&PE Arena (577); Houston, TX
02/10/2018; 2:00 pm		SMU	L 35–53	7–17 (2–9)	Elma Roma Fieldhouse (437); Memphis, TN
02/14/2018; 2:00 pm, ESPN3		at East Carolina	L 62–75	7–18 (2–10)	Williams Arena (756); Greenville, NC
02/18/2018; 2:00 pm, ESPN2		Tulane	W 73–60	8–18 (3–10)	Elma Roma Fieldhouse (467); Memphis, TN
02/21/2018; 7:00 pm, ADN		UCF	L 40–63	8–19 (3–11)	Elma Roma Fieldhouse (391); Memphis, TN
02/24/2018; 1:00 pm		Tulsa	W 65–56	9–19 (4–11)	Elma Roma Fieldhouse (502); Memphis, TN
02/26/2018; 6:00 pm, CBSSN		at Temple	W 83–78 ^{OT}	10–19 (5–11)	McGonigle Hall; Philadelphia, PA
AAC Women's Tournament
03/03/2018; 5:00 pm, ESPN3	(8)	vs. (9) Tulane; First Round	L 64–76	10–20	Mohegan Sun Arena (4,599); Uncasville, CT
*Non-conference game. ^{#}Rankings from AP Poll. (#) Tournament seedings in parentheses. All times are in Central Time.

== See also ==
- 2017–18 Memphis Tigers men's basketball team
