= Chain of Lakes Collegiate High School =

Location
- 999 Avenue H NE; Winter Haven, Florida; United States
- Coordinates: 28.0303°N 81.7126°W

Information
- Type: Charter
- NCES School ID: 120159005349
- Teaching staff: 8.00 (on FTE basis)
- Grades: 10 to 12
- Enrollment: 328 (2012–2023)
- Student to teacher ratio: 41.00
- Colors: Red, black, and White
- Website: www.polk.edu/col

Chain of Lakes Collegiate High School is located at 999 Avenue H NE in Winter Haven, Florida, United States. A charter school, it is affiliated and colocated with Polk State College. Chain of Lakes Collegiate High School acts as a way for students to receive high school credits as well as college credits simultaneously. Once accepted into said program you would spend the next two years completing both your high school diploma as well as your Associate of Arts degree. Polk State College Chain of Lakes Collegiate High School is a public charter school that provides highly motivated 10th, 11th, and 12th-grade students from throughout Polk County with a distinctive experience, blending traditional high school with collegiate coursework.

== Cost ==
Many enjoy the opportunity this program provides as it is free of cost. This includes textbooks and courses. (textbooks are on loan for the semester and must be returned).

== Location ==
Chain of Lakes Collegiate High School is located at the Polk State College Winter Haven campus. However, you can take your college classes at any Polk State location. You can also take classes during the summer terms and evenings at no additional cost. COL has advisers to help you find the schedule and coursework that best fit your special talents, plans and capabilities. Upon acceptance, an initial academic planning meeting is scheduled to create a plan of study for your last two years of high school. Your counselor will guide and advise you through the process of registration and choosing classes.

== Administration ==
(as of April 2022) Principal: Patrice Bryant Thigpen

== Clubs and organizations ==
Key Club, SGA: student government association, Florida Future Educators of America, COL National Honors Society.
