= 2017–18 Oklahoma State Cowgirls basketball team =

Intercollegiate basketball season

2017–18 Oklahoma State Cowgirls basketball

NCAA Women's Tournament, second round
- Conference: Big 12 Conference
- Record: 21–11 (11–7 Big 12)
- Head coach: Jim Littell (7th season)
- Assistant coaches: Bill Annan; Ashley Davis; Jerise Freeman
- Home arena: Gallagher-Iba Arena

2017–18 Big 12 Conference women's basketball standings
	Conf.				Overall
Team	W		L	PCT	W		L	PCT
No. 2 Baylor †	18	–	0	1.000	33	–	2	.943
No. 8 Texas	15	–	3	.833	28	–	7	.800
Oklahoma State	11	–	7	.611	21	–	11	.656
Oklahoma	11	–	7	.611	16	–	15	.516
TCU	9	–	9	.500	23	–	13	.639
West Virginia	8	–	10	.444	25	–	12	.676
Iowa State	7	–	11	.389	14	–	17	.452
Kansas State	7	–	11	.389	18	–	16	.529
Kansas	3	–	15	.167	12	–	18	.400
Texas Tech	1	–	17	.056	7	–	23	.233
† 2018 Big 12 Tournament winner Rankings from AP poll

The 2017–18 Oklahoma State Cowgirls basketball team represented Oklahoma State University in the 2017–18 NCAA Division I women's basketball season. The Cowgirls, led by seventh-year head coach Jim Littell, played their home games at Gallagher-Iba Arena and were members of the Big 12 Conference. They finished the season 21–11, 11–7 in Big 12 play to finish in a tie for third place. They lost in the quarterfinals of the Big 12 women's tournament to West Virginia. They received an at-large bid to the NCAA women's basketball tournament, where they defeated Syracuse in the first round before losing to Mississippi State in the second round.

== Previous season ==
For the 2016-17 season, Oklahoma State finished 17-15, 6-12 in the Big 12 and finished 7th in the conference standings. The Cowgirls were eliminated in the quarterfinals of the Big 12 women's tournament, losing to #12 Texas. They did not make the NCAA women's tournament, instead, they were selected to be in the 2017 WNIT as an at-large bid. They played at home against Abilene Christian. They lost in the first round 56-66 in an upset against Abilene Christian.

== Roster ==
2017–18 Oklahoma State Cowgirls women's basketball team
Players
Coaches

Pos.	#	Name	Height	Year	Previous school	Hometown
G	2	Katarina Adamovic	5 ft 8 in (1.73 m)	Sr	Toza Dragovic	Čačak, Serbia
F/C	3	Mandy Coleman	6 ft 3 in (1.91 m)	Sr	McNair	Stockton, CA
G	10	Shakila Small	6 ft 3 in (1.91 m)	Sr	Medgar Evers College Prep; ASA College	Brooklyn, NY
G	11	Areanna Combs	5 ft 10 in (1.78 m)	So	Putnam City West	Oklahoma City, OK
F	13	Jentry Holt	6 ft 3 in (1.91 m)	Jr	Elgin	Elgin, OK
G	14	Braxtin Miller	5 ft 10 in (1.78 m)	Fr	Alter High School	Centerville, OH
F	20	LaTashia Jones	6 ft 2 in (1.88 m)	Jr	Leavenworth	Leavenworth, KS
G	21	Ja'Mee Asberry	5 ft 5 in (1.65 m)	Fr	East Central	Tulsa, OK
G	23	Jaden Hobbs	5 ft 8 in (1.73 m)	RS Fr	Alva	Alva, OK
G	24	Karli Wheeler	5 ft 8 in (1.73 m)	Jr	Plainview	Plainview, TX
F	25	Abbie Winchester	6 ft 1 in (1.85 m)	Fr	Heritage Hall	Oklahoma City, OK
G	30	Maria Castro	6 ft 0 in (1.83 m)	Jr	Tecnologico De Monterrey; Gulf Coast State	Guanajuato, Mexico
G	32	Loryn Goodwin	5 ft 9 in (1.75 m)	RS Sr	Cypress Falls; UTSA	Cypress, TX
G	33	Clitan de Sousa	6 ft 0 in (1.83 m)	Jr	Apolotecnica; Seward County CC	Maputo, Mozambique
C	54	Kaylee Jensen	6 ft 4 in (1.93 m)	Sr	Lindsay Holy Family	Genoa, NE

Head coach

- Jim Littell (Southwestern (KS))

Assistant coach(es)

- Bill Annan (Kansas State)
- Ashley Davis (TCU)
- Jerise Freeman (Pacific)

Legend

- (C) Team captain
- (S) Suspended
- (I) Ineligible
- (W) Walk-on
- Injured
- Current redshirt

Roster

== Schedule and results ==
Date time, TV	Rank^{#}	Opponent^{#}	Result	Record	Site (attendance) city, state
Exhibition
10/29/2017*; 5:00 pm		East Central	W 110–46		Gallagher-Iba Arena (864); Stillwater, OK
Non-conference regular season
11/10/2017*; 11:00 am		Incarnate Word	W 86–35	1–0	Gallagher-Iba Arena (3,935); Stillwater, OK
11/14/2017*; 7:00 pm, FSOK+		Wichita State	W 91–67	2–0	Gallagher-Iba Arena (1,543); Stillwater, OK
11/17/2017*; 7:00 pm		Texas–Rio Grande Valley	W 80–38	3–0	Gallagher-Iba Arena (1,441); Stillwater, OK
11/19/2017*; 1:00 pm		Northwestern State	W 78–44	4–0	Gallagher-Iba Arena (1,617); Stillwater, OK
11/23/2017*; 3:00 pm		vs. South Dakota; Women's Cancún Challenge Riviera Division	W 76–68	5–0	Hard Rock Hotel Riviera Convention Center (982); Cancún, Mexico
11/24/2017*; 3:00 pm		vs. No. 12 Tennessee; Women's Cancún Challenge Riviera Division	L 69–79	5–1	Hard Rock Hotel Riviera Convention Center (N/A); Cancún, Mexico
11/30/2017*; 7:00 pm		Southern	W 94–66	6–1	Gallagher-Iba Arena (1,280); Stillwater, OK
12/03/2017*; 1:00 pm, SECN		at No. 6 Mississippi State; Big 12/SEC Women's Challenge	L 76–79	6–2	Humphrey Coliseum (5,138); Starkville, MS
12/08/2017*; 7:00 pm, FSOK		No. 7 UCLA	W 87–72	7–2	Gallagher-Iba Arena (2,969); Stillwater, OK
12/19/2017*; 5:00 pm		USC Upstate	W 108–71	8–2	Gallagher-Iba Arena (1,830); Stillwater, OK
12/21/2017*; 7:00 pm		Louisiana–Monroe	W 112–58	9–2	Gallagher-Iba Arena (1,686); Stillwater, OK
Big 12 regular season
12/28/2017; 6:30 pm	No. 24	at Texas Tech	W 98–57	10–2 (1–0)	United Supermarkets Arena (4,371); Lubbock, TX
12/31/2017; 2:00 pm	No. 24	Kansas State	W 76–68	11–2 (2–0)	Gallagher-Iba Arena (2,277); Stillwater, OK
01/03/2018; 7:00 pm, LHN	No. 20	at No. 8 Texas	L 79–84	11–3 (2–1)	Frank Erwin Center (3,240); Austin, TX
01/07/2018; 4:00 pm, FSOK	No. 20	Oklahoma; Bedlam Series	W 96–82	12–3 (3–1)	Gallagher-Iba Arena (3,128); Stillwater, OK
01/13/2018; 1:00 pm, FSN	No. 20	at Kansas State	L 64–80	12–4 (3–2)	Bramlage Coliseum (4,041); Manhattan, KS
01/17/2018; 7:00 pm	No. 24	No. 17 West Virginia	W 79–73	13–4 (4–2)	Gallagher-Iba Arena (1,520); Stillwater, OK
01/20/2018; 12:00 pm, FSN	No. 24	at Oklahoma; Bedlam Series	W 70–67	14–4 (5–2)	Lloyd Noble Center (4,529); Norman, OK
01/24/2018; 8:00 pm, FSN	No. 19	Iowa State	L 69–78	14–5 (5–3)	Gallagher-Iba Arena (1,370); Stillwater, OK
01/27/2018; 1:00 pm	No. 19	Texas Tech	W 80–62	15–5 (6–3)	Gallagher-Iba Arena (1,825); Stillwater, OK
01/31/2018; 6:30 pm, FSSW	No. 23	at No. 3 Baylor	L 64–77	15–6 (6–4)	Ferrell Center (5,260); Waco, TX
02/03/2018; 7:30 pm	No. 23	Kansas	W 92–63	16–6 (7–4)	Gallagher-Iba Arena (2,346); Stillwater, OK
02/07/2018; 6:30 pm, FSSW	No. 22	at No. 24 TCU	W 71–54	17–6 (8–4)	Schollmaier Arena (3,125); Fort Worth, TX
02/10/2018; 6:30 pm, Cyclones.tv	No. 22	at Iowa State	W 81–73	18–6 (9–4)	Hilton Coliseum (10,148); Ames, IA
02/13/2018; 7:00 pm, FSOK+	No. 21	No. 3 Baylor	L 45–87	18–7 (9–5)	Gallagher-Iba Arena (1,702); Stillwater, OK
02/17/2018; 2:00 pm, FSOK	No. 21	No. 6 Texas	L 62–77	18–8 (9–6)	Gallagher-Iba Arena (2,131); Stillwater, OK
02/21/2017; 7:00 pm, ESPN3	No. 25	at Kansas	L 59–66	18–9 (9–7)	Allen Fieldhouse (2,059); Lawrence, KS
02/24/2018; 12:00 pm	No. 25	at West Virginia	W 79–69	19–9 (10–7)	WVU Coliseum (4,058); Morgantown, WV
02/26/2018; 7:00 pm, FSSW+		TCU	W 85–72	20–9 (11–7)	Gallagher-Iba Arena (1,563); Stillwater, OK
Big 12 Conference tournament
03/03/2018; 8:30 pm, FSN	(3)	vs. (6) West Virginia; Quarterfinals	L 60–69	20–10	Chesapeake Energy Arena (3,676); Oklahoma City, OK
NCAA Women's Tournament
03/17/2018*; 2:30 pm, ESPN2	(9 KC)	vs. (8 KC) Syracuse; First Round	W 84–57	21–10	Humphrey Coliseum; Starkville, MS
03/19/2018*; 8:00 pm, ESPN2	(9 KC)	at (1 KC) No. 4 Mississippi State; Second Round	L 56–71	21–11	Humphrey Coliseum (9,881); Starkville, MS
*Non-conference game. ^{#}Rankings from AP Poll. (#) Tournament seedings in parentheses. KC=Kansas City Region. All times are in Central Time.

== Rankings ==
Regular season polls
Poll	Pre- season	Week 2	Week 3	Week 4	Week 5	Week 6	Week 7	Week 8	Week 9	Week 10	Week 11	Week 12	Week 13	Week 14	Week 15	Week 16	Week 17	Week 18	Week 19	Final
AP	RV	RV	RV	RV	RV	RV	RV	24	20	20	24	19	23	22	21	25	RV	RV	RV	N/A
Coaches	NR	N/A	NR	NR	RV	RV	RV	RV	23	22	RV	22	22	25	22	23	RV	RV	RV	RV

Legend
	Increase in ranking
	Decrease in ranking
	Not ranked previous week
(RV)	Received votes
(NR)	Not ranked and did not receive votes

== See also ==
- 2017–18 Oklahoma State Cowboys basketball team
