= 2017–18 Texas Tech Lady Raiders basketball team =

Intercollegiate basketball season

2017–18 Texas Tech Lady Raiders basketball
- Conference: Big 12 Conference
- Record: 7–23 (1–17 Big 12)
- Head coach: Candi Whitaker (5th season) (1st season); Shimmy Gray-Miller
- Assistant coaches: Brandi Poole; Sheryl Swoopes
- Home arena: United Supermarkets Arena

2017–18 Big 12 Conference women's basketball standings
	Conf.				Overall
Team	W		L	PCT	W		L	PCT
No. 2 Baylor †	18	–	0	1.000	33	–	2	.943
No. 8 Texas	15	–	3	.833	28	–	7	.800
Oklahoma State	11	–	7	.611	21	–	11	.656
Oklahoma	11	–	7	.611	16	–	15	.516
TCU	9	–	9	.500	23	–	13	.639
West Virginia	8	–	10	.444	25	–	12	.676
Iowa State	7	–	11	.389	14	–	17	.452
Kansas State	7	–	11	.389	18	–	16	.529
Kansas	3	–	15	.167	12	–	18	.400
Texas Tech	1	–	17	.056	7	–	23	.233
† 2018 Big 12 Tournament winner Rankings from AP poll

The 2017–18 Texas Tech Lady Raiders basketball team represented Texas Tech University in the 2017–18 NCAA Division I women's basketball season. The Lady Raiders were led by fifth year head coach Candi Whitaker until she was replaced by interim head coach Shimmy Gray-Miller on January 1, 2018. They played their homes games at United Supermarkets Arena and are members of the Big 12 Conference. They finished the season 7–23, 1–17 in Big 12 play to finish in last place. They lost in the first round of the Big 12 women's tournament to Iowa State.

== Previous season ==
They finished the season 14–17, 5–13 in Big 12 play to finish in eighth place. They advanced to the quarterfinals of the Big 12 women's tournament where they lost to Baylor.

== Media ==
=== Television & Radio information ===
Select Lady Raiders games will be shown on FSN affiliates throughout the season, including FSSW, FSSW+, and FCS Atlantic, Central, and Pacific. All games will be broadcast on the Lady Raiders Radio Network on either KLZK or KJTV.

== Roster ==
2017–18 Texas Tech Lady Raiders women's basketball team
Players
Coaches

Pos.	#	Name	Height	Year	Previous school	Hometown
F	0	Brielle Blaire	6 ft 2 in (1.88 m)	Sr	Terra Nova; Virginia Tech	Salisbury, NC
C	1	Erin Degrate	6 ft 6 in (1.98 m)	RS So	La Vega; Louisville	Waco, TX
G	2	Sydney Goodson (redshirt)	5 ft 8 in (1.73 m)	So	Liberty Christian; Arizona State	Argyle, TX
G	3	Lyndsey Whilby	5 ft 11 in (1.8 m)	Fr	McEachern	Powder Springs, GA
G	4	Recee' Caldwell	5 ft 8 in (1.73 m)	RS Jr	Homeschooled; UCLA	San Antonio, TX
F	5	Tihana Stojsavljevic (redshirt)	6 ft 2 in (1.88 m)	So	Tresnjevka; Maine	Zagreb, Croatia
G	10	Grayson Bright	5 ft 11 in (1.8 m)	So	Fossil Ridge	Fort Worth, TX
C	12	Jada Terry	6 ft 4 in (1.93 m)	RS Sr	Cedar Hill; Texas A&M	Cedar Hill, TX
G	14	Lauren Harrison	6 ft 0 in (1.83 m)	So	Concordia Lutheran	The Woodlands, TX
F	20	Brittany Brewer	6 ft 4 in (1.93 m)	So	Wylie	Abilene, TX
G	23	Angel Hayden	5 ft 6 in (1.68 m)	Fr	Canyon	Canyon, TX
G	24	Haley Bruedigam	5 ft 9 in (1.75 m)	RS Jr	Lubbock; West Texas A&M	Lubbock, TX
F	30	Zuri Sanders	6 ft 0 in (1.83 m)	Jr	Evansville Central	Evansville, IN
G/F	32	Dayo Olabode	6 ft 2 in (1.88 m)	Sr	Mansfield Timberview	Arlington, TX
C	42	Ionna McKenzie	6 ft 2 in (1.88 m)	Sr	Dr. Phillips	Gotha, FL

Head coach

- Candi Whitaker (Valparaiso)
- Shimmy Gray-Miller (Michigan)

Assistant coach(es)

- Brandi Poole (Sewanee)
- Sheryl Swoopes (Texas Tech)

Legend

- (C) Team captain
- (S) Suspended
- (I) Ineligible
- (W) Walk-on
- Injured
- Current redshirt

Roster
Last update: February 3, 2018

== Schedule ==
Date time, TV	Rank^{#}	Opponent^{#}	Result	Record	Site (attendance) city, state
Exhibition
11/05/2017*; 2:00 pm		St. Edward's	W 73–40		United Supermarkets Arena (2,730); Lubbock, TX
Non-conference regular season
11/12/2017*; 2:00 pm		Texas State	L 70–87	0–1	United Supermarkets Arena (3,611); Lubbock, TX
11/15/2017*; 11:00 am		Florida A&M	W 82–63	1–1	United Supermarkets Arena (8,238); Lubbock, TX
11/19/2017*; 2:00 pm		Arkansas–Pine Bluff	W 74–47	2–1	United Supermarkets Arena (3,335); Lubbock, TX
11/22/2017*; 3:00 pm		UMass Lowell	W 93–65	3–1	United Supermarkets Arena (3,057); Lubbock, TX
11/26/2017*; 2:00 pm, FSSW		No. 19 Texas A&M	L 56–90	3–2	United Supermarkets Arena (4,047); Lubbock, TX
11/30/2017*; 6:30 pm, FSSW+		LSU; Big 12/SEC Women's Challenge	L 40–48	3–3	United Supermarkets Arena (4,303); Lubbock, TX
12/03/2017*; 2:00 pm		at Houston	L 75–79	3–4	H&PE Arena; Houston, TX
12/06/2017*; 8:00 pm		at New Mexico	L 56–90	3–5	Dreamstyle Arena (5,663); Albuquerque, NM
12/06/2017*; 5:30 pm		Prairie View A&M	W 89–60	4–5	United Supermarkets Arena (3,797); Lubbock, TX
12/17/2017*; 2:00 pm		Texas–Rio Grande Valley	W 80–64	5–5	Lubbock Municipal Coliseum (2,292); Lubbock, TX
12/21/2017*; 2:00 pm		Incarnate Word	W 80–54	6–5	United Supermarkets Arena (3,384); Lubbock, TX
Big 12 regular season
12/28/2017; 6:30 pm		No. 24 Oklahoma State	L 57–98	6–6 (0–1)	United Supermarkets Arena (4,371); Lubbock, TX
12/31/2017; 1:00 pm, ESPNU		at No. 6 Baylor	L 49–97	6–7 (0–2)	Ferrell Center (4,371); Waco, TX
01/03/2018; 6:30 pm		Kansas	L 47–60	6–8 (0–3)	United Supermarkets Arena (3,388); Lubbock, TX
01/07/2018; 2:00 pm, FSN		at TCU	L 72–93	6–9 (0–4)	Schollmaier Arena (1,929); Fort Worth, TX
01/10/2018; 6:30 pm, FSSW+		Oklahoma	L 52–73	6–10 (0–5)	United Supermarkets Arena (4,352); Lubbock, TX
01/13/2018; 6:00 pm, FSSW+		Iowa State	L 54–66	6–11 (0–6)	United Supermarkets Arena (3,823); Lubbock, TX
01/17/2018; 7:00 pm, ESPN3		at Kansas	W 68–56	7–11 (1–6)	Allen Fieldhouse (1,556); Lawrence, KS
01/20/2018; 3:00 pm, FSN		No. 9 Texas	L 49–90	7–12 (1–7)	United Supermarkets Arena (5,330); Lubbock, TX
01/24/2018; 6:00 pm		at No. 20 West Virginia	L 49–90	7–13 (1–8)	WVU Coliseum (1,987); Morgantown, WV
01/27/2018; 1:00 pm		at No. 19 Oklahoma State	L 57–98	7–14 (1–9)	Gallagher-Iba Arena (1,825); Stillwater, OK
02/03/2018; 2:00 pm		No. 3 Baylor	L 44–90	7–15 (1–10)	United Supermarkets Arena (3,207); Lubbock, TX
02/07/2018; 7:00 pm		at Kansas State	L 69–83	7–16 (1–11)	Bramlage Coliseum (3,147); Manhattan, KS
02/10/2018; 2:00 pm, FSSW		West Virginia	L 60–74	7–17 (1–12)	United Supermarkets Arena (3,116); Lubbock, TX
02/14/2018; 7:00 pm, LHN		at No. 6 Texas	L 72–87	7–18 (1–13)	Frank Erwin Center (3,082); Austin, TX
02/17/2018; 3:00 pm		at Iowa State	L 57–69	7–19 (1–14)	Hilton Coliseum (11,072); Ames, IA
02/21/2018; 6:30 pm, FSSW		TCU	L 60–72	7–20 (1–15)	United Supermarkets Arena (3,976); Lubbock, TX
02/24/2018; 12:00 pm, FSOK		at Oklahoma	L 61–79	7–21 (1–16)	Lloyd Noble Center (5,030); Norman, OK
02/26/2018; 6:30 pm, FSSW+		Kansas State	L 63–86	7–22 (1–17)	United Supermarkets Arena (3,084); Lubbock, TX
Big 12 Women's Tournament
03/02/2018; 8:30 pm, FCS	(10)	vs. (7) Iowa State; First Round	L 49–74	7–23	Chesapeake Energy Arena (2,779); Oklahoma City, OK
*Non-conference game. ^{#}Rankings from AP Poll. (#) Tournament seedings in parentheses. All times are in Central Time.

== See also ==
- 2017–18 Texas Tech Red Raiders basketball team
