= 2017–18 Baylor Lady Bears basketball team =

Intercollegiate basketball season

2017–18 Baylor Lady Bears basketball

Junkanoo Jam champions Big 12 regular season champions Big 12 Tournament champions

NCAA tournament, Sweet Sixteen
- Conference: Big 12 Conference

Ranking
- Coaches: No. 9
- AP: No. 2
- Record: 33–2 (18–0 Big 12)
- Head coach: Kim Mulkey (18th season)
- Assistant coaches: Bill Brock; Sytia Messer; Toyelle Wilson
- Home arena: Ferrell Center

2017–18 Big 12 Conference women's basketball standings
	Conf.				Overall
Team	W		L	PCT	W		L	PCT
No. 2 Baylor †	18	–	0	1.000	33	–	2	.943
No. 8 Texas	15	–	3	.833	28	–	7	.800
Oklahoma State	11	–	7	.611	21	–	11	.656
Oklahoma	11	–	7	.611	16	–	15	.516
TCU	9	–	9	.500	23	–	13	.639
West Virginia	8	–	10	.444	25	–	12	.676
Iowa State	7	–	11	.389	14	–	17	.452
Kansas State	7	–	11	.389	18	–	16	.529
Kansas	3	–	15	.167	12	–	18	.400
Texas Tech	1	–	17	.056	7	–	23	.233
† 2018 Big 12 Tournament winner Rankings from AP poll

The 2017–18 Baylor Lady Bears basketball team represented Baylor University in the 2017–18 NCAA Division I women's basketball season. Returning as head coach was Hall of Famer Kim Mulkey for her 18th season. The team played its home games at the Ferrell Center in Waco, Texas and were members of the Big 12 Conference. They finished the season 33–2, 18–0 in Big 12 to win the Big 12 regular season title. They also won the Big 12 women's tournament and earned an automatic bid to the NCAA women's tournament, where they defeated Grambling State and Michigan in the first and second rounds before getting upset by Oregon State in the sweet sixteen.

== Previous season ==
For the 2016–17 season, Baylor finished 33–4, 17–1 in the Big 12 to win the regular season title. They advanced to the championship game of the Big 12 women's tournament, where they were upset by West Virginia. They earned an at-large bid to the NCAA women's tournament as a No. 1 seed, where they defeated Texas Southern and California in the first and second rounds, Louisville in the Sweet Sixteen before losing to Mississippi State in the Elite Eight.

== Roster ==
2017–18 Baylor Bears women's basketball team
Players
Coaches

Pos.	#	Name	Height	Year	Previous school	Hometown
F	1	Dekeiya Cohen	6 ft 2 in (1.88 m)	Sr	West Ashley HS	Charleston, SC
G	2	DiDi Richards	6 ft 1 in (1.85 m)	Fr	Cypress Ranch HS	Cypress, TX
G	3	Trinity Oliver	5 ft 11 in (1.8 m)	Fr	Trinity HS	Euless, TX
G	4	Kristy Wallace	5 ft 11 in (1.8 m)	Sr	John Paul College	Loganholme, Australia
G	11	Alexis Morris	5 ft 6 in (1.68 m)	Fr	Legacy Christian Academy	Beaumont, TX
G	12	Moon Ursin	5 ft 7 in (1.7 m)	Fr	Destrehan HS	Destrehan, LA
F	15	Lauren Cox	6 ft 4 in (1.93 m)	So	Flower Mound HS	Flower Mound, TX
G	20	Calveion Landrum	5 ft 9 in (1.75 m)	So	La Vega HS	Waco, TX
C	21	Kalani Brown	6 ft 7 in (2.01 m)	Jr	Salmen HS	Slidell, LA
G	24	Natalie Chou	6 ft 1 in (1.85 m)	So	Plano West HS	Plano, TX

Head coach

- Kim Mulkey (Louisiana Tech)

Assistant coach(es)

- Bill Brock (SE Oklahoma State)
- Sytia Messer (Arkansas)
- Toyelle Wilson (Manhattan)

Legend

- (C) Team captain
- (S) Suspended
- (I) Ineligible
- (W) Walk-on
- Injured
- Current redshirt

Roster

== Schedule and results ==
Date time, TV	Rank^{#}	Opponent^{#}	Result	Record	Site (attendance) city, state
Exhibition
Oct 31, 2017*; 7:00 pm	No. 3	Tarleton State	W 122–44		Ferrell Center (4,931); Waco, TX
Nov 06, 2017*; 7:00 pm	No. 3	Washburn	W 117–33		Ferrell Center (4,736); Waco, TX
Non-conference regular season
Nov 10, 2017*; 7:00 pm	No. 3	Lamar	W 121–62	1–0	Ferrell Center (5,410); Waco, TX
Nov 12, 2017*; 2:00 pm	No. 3	Coppin State	W 100–54	2–0	Ferrell Center (4,939); Waco, TX
Nov 14, 2017*; 6:30 pm, FCS	No. 3	Central Arkansas	W 86–55	3–0	Ferrell Center (4,939); Waco, TX
Nov 18, 2017*; 1:00 pm	No. 3	at No. 8 UCLA	L 68–82	3–1	Pauley Pavilion (3,912); Los Angeles, CA
Nov 23, 2017*; 7:00 pm	No. 8	vs. Missouri State; Junkanoo Jam Junkanoo Division semifinals	W 100–58	4–1	Gateway Christian Academy; Bimini, Bahamas
Nov 25, 2017*; 7:00 pm	No. 8	vs. Georgia Tech; Junkanoo Jam Junkanoo Division championship	W 80–57	5–1	Gateway Christian Academy; Bimini, Bahamas
Nov 30, 2017*; 7:00 pm, FCS	No. 9	No. 20 Kentucky; Big 12/SEC Women's Challenge	W 90–63	6–1	Ferrell Center (5,356); Waco, TX
Dec 03, 2017*; 11:00 am, FS1	No. 9	No. 16 Stanford	W 81–57	7–1	Ferrell Center (8,012); Waco, TX
Dec 05, 2017*; 7:00 pm	No. 8	North Dakota	W 105–43	8–1	Ferrell Center (4,788); Waco, TX
Dec 13, 2017*; 12:00 pm, FSSW	No. 6	McNeese State	W 95–34	9–1	Ferrell Center (6,583); Waco, TX
Dec 18, 2017*; 7:00 pm, ELVN	No. 6	at Nicholls State	W 85–43	10–1	Stopher Gym (1,034); Thibodaux, LA
Big 12 regular season
Dec 28, 2017; 7:00 pm, Cox Kansas	No. 6	at Kansas State	W 88–58	11–1 (1–0)	Bramlage Coliseum (3,396); Manhattan, KS
Dec 31, 2017; 1:00 pm, ESPNU	No. 6	Texas Tech	W 97–49	12–1 (2–0)	Ferrell Center (5,540); Waco, TX
Jan 03, 2018; 7:00 pm, FSSW+	No. 6	Iowa State	W 89–49	13–1 (3–0)	Ferrell Center (5,113); Waco, TX
Jan 06, 2018; 2:00 pm, ESPN3	No. 6	at Kansas	W 83–48	14–1 (4–0)	Allen Fieldhouse (2,216); Lawrence, KS
Jan 14, 2018; 1:00 pm, FS1	No. 5	at Oklahoma	W 74–52	15–1 (5–0)	Lloyd Noble Center (3,510); Norman, OK
Jan 17, 2018; 7:00 pm, FSN	No. 4	at Iowa State	W 79–50	16–1 (6–0)	Hilton Coliseum (9,510); Ames, IA
Jan 20, 2018; 6:00 pm, FSSW	No. 4	Kansas State	W 75–50	17–1 (7–0)	Ferrell Center (6,131); Waco, TX
Jan 25, 2018; 6:00 pm, ESPN2	No. 3	No. 6 Texas	W 81–56	18–1 (8–0)	Ferrell Center (9,286); Waco, TX
Jan 28, 2018; 2:00 pm, FS1	No. 3	at No. 20 West Virginia	W 83–72	19–1 (9–0)	WVU Coliseum (5,073); Morgantown, WV
Jan 31, 2018; 6:30 pm, FSSW	No. 3	No. 23 Oklahoma State	W 77–64	20–1 (10–0)	Ferrell Center (5,260); Waco, TX
Feb 03, 2018; 2:00 pm	No. 3	at Texas Tech	W 90–44	21–1 (11–0)	United Supermarkets Arena (3,207); Lubbock, TX
Feb 05, 2018; 8:00 pm, FS1	No. 3	Oklahoma	W 74–65	22–1 (12–0)	Ferrell Center (5,324); Waco, TX
Feb 10, 2018; 7:00 pm, FSSW+	No. 3	No. 24 TCU	W 83–63	23–1 (13–0)	Ferrell Center (6,524); Waco, TX
Feb 13, 2018; 7:00 pm, FSSW+	No. 3	at No. 21 Oklahoma State	W 87–45	24–1 (14–0)	Gallagher-Iba Arena (1,702); Stillwater, OK
Feb 17, 2018; 1:00 pm, FSSW	No. 3	Kansas	W 88–51	25–1 (15–0)	Ferrell Center (6,416); Waco, TX
Feb 19, 2018; 7:00 pm, ESPN2	No. 3	at No. 6 Texas	W 93–87	26–1 (16–0)	Frank Erwin Center (6,642); Austin, TX
Feb 24, 2018; 5:00 pm	No. 3	at TCU	W 85–53	27–1 (17–0)	Schollmaier Arena (3,186); Fort Worth, TX
Feb 26, 2018; 8:00 pm, FS1	No. 3	West Virginia	W 80–54	28–1 (18–0)	Ferrell Center (6,671); Waco, TX
Big 12 Women's Tournament
Mar 03, 2018; 1:30 pm, FSN	(1) No. 3	vs. (8) Kansas State; Quarterfinals	W 83–54	29–1	Chesapeake Energy Arena (4,047); Oklahoma City, OK
Mar 04, 2018; 2:00 pm, FS1	(1) No. 3	vs. (5) TCU; Semifinals	W 94–48	30–1	Chesapeake Energy Arena; Oklahoma City, OK
Mar 05, 2018; 8:00 pm, FS1	(1) No. 2	vs. (2) No. 8 Texas; Championship Game	W 77–69	31–1	Chesapeake Energy Arena (3,520); Oklahoma City, OK
NCAA Women's Tournament
Mar 16, 2018*; 6:30 pm, ESPN2	(2 L) No. 2	(15 L) Grambling State; First Round	W 96–46	32–1	Ferrell Center (4,933); Waco, TX
Mar 18, 2018*; 7:00 pm, ESPN2	(2 L) No. 2	(7 L) Michigan; Second Round	W 80–58	33–1	Ferrell Center (4,114); Waco, TX
Mar 23, 2018*; 6:00 pm, ESPN2	(2 L) No. 2	vs. (6 L) No. 13 Oregon State; Sweet Sixteen	L 67–72	33–2	Rupp Arena; Lexington, KY
*Non-conference game. ^{#}Rankings from AP Poll. (#) Tournament seedings in parentheses. L=Lexington Region. All times are in Central Time.

== Rankings ==
Regular season ranking movement Legend: ██ Increase in ranking. ██ Decrease in ranking. ██ Not ranked the previous week. RV=Received votes.
Poll	Pre- Season	Week 2	Week 3	Week 4	Week 5	Week 6	Week 7	Week 8	Week 9	Week 10	Week 11	Week 12	Week 13	Week 14	Week 15	Week 16	Week 17	Week 18	Week 19	Final
AP	3	3	8	9	8	6	6	6	6	5	4	3	3	3	3	3	3	2	2	N/A
Coaches	3	N/A	9	9	8	6	6	6	6	5	4	3	3	3	3	3	3	2	2	9
