= 2017–18 West Virginia Mountaineers women's basketball team =

American college basketball season

2017–18 West Virginia Mountaineers women's basketball

Paradise Jam Island Division Champions

WNIT, Semifinals
- Conference: Big 12 Conference
- Record: 25–12 (8–10 Big 12)
- Head coach: Mike Carey (17th season)
- Assistant coaches: Chester Nichols; Lester Rowe; Christal Caldwell
- Home arena: WVU Coliseum

2017–18 Big 12 Conference women's basketball standings
	Conf.				Overall
Team	W		L	PCT	W		L	PCT
No. 2 Baylor †	18	–	0	1.000	33	–	2	.943
No. 8 Texas	15	–	3	.833	28	–	7	.800
Oklahoma State	11	–	7	.611	21	–	11	.656
Oklahoma	11	–	7	.611	16	–	15	.516
TCU	9	–	9	.500	23	–	13	.639
West Virginia	8	–	10	.444	25	–	12	.676
Iowa State	7	–	11	.389	14	–	17	.452
Kansas State	7	–	11	.389	18	–	16	.529
Kansas	3	–	15	.167	12	–	18	.400
Texas Tech	1	–	17	.056	7	–	23	.233
† 2018 Big 12 Tournament winner Rankings from AP poll

The 2017–18 West Virginia Mountaineers women's basketball team represented West Virginia University during the 2017–18 NCAA Division I women's basketball season. The Mountaineers were coached by seventeenth year head coach Mike Carey, played their home games at WVU Coliseum and were members of the Big 12 Conference. They finished the season 25–12, 8–10 in Big 12 play to finish in sixth place. They advanced to the semifinals of the Big 12 women's tournament, where they lost to Texas. They received an automatic bid to the Women's National Invitation Tournament, where they defeated Bucknell, Saint Joseph's and James Madison in the first, second and third rounds, St. John's in the quarterfinals before losing to Virginia Tech in the semifinals.

== Previous season ==
The team finished sixth in the regular season but won the 2017 Big 12 Tournament. They finished with a record of 24–11, 8–10 in Big 12 play to finish in sixth place. They received an automatic bid to the NCAA women's tournament where they defeated Elon in the first round before losing to Maryland in the second round.

== Roster ==
2017–18 West Virginia Mountaineers women's basketball team
Players
Coaches

Pos.	#	Name	Height	Year	Previous school	Hometown
G/F	0	Naomi Davenport	6 ft 0 in (1.83 m)	Jr	Mount Notre Dame; Trinity Valley CC	Cincinnati, OH
G	1	Ashley Jones	5 ft 7 in (1.7 m)	Fr	Neumann-Goretti Catholic	Philadelphia, PA
G	2	Kysre Gondrezick (redshirt)	5 ft 9 in (1.75 m)	So	Benton Harbor; Michigan	Benton Harbor, MI
G/F	3	Destiny Harden	6 ft 0 in (1.83 m)	Fr	Morgan Park	Chicago, IL
G	4	Nia Staples	5 ft 9 in (1.75 m)	RS Fr	Lakota West	Cincinnati, OH
G	5	Tynice Martin	5 ft 10 in (1.78 m)	Jr	Southwest Atlanta Christian Academy	Atlanta, GA
F	11	Teana Muldrow	6 ft 1 in (1.85 m)	RS Sr	East Orange	East Orange, NJ
G	12	Chania Ray	5 ft 8 in (1.73 m)	Sr	Riverdale Baptist; Florida State	Alexandria, VA
F	13	Kristina King	6 ft 3 in (1.91 m)	Sr	New Hope Christian Academy; Gulf Coast State	Mebane, NC
G	22	Katrina Pardee	5 ft 9 in (1.75 m)	Jr	Vista Ridge	Cedar Park, TX
G/F	24	Anja Martin	5 ft 11 in (1.8 m)	Jr	John Paul Stevens	San Antonio, TX
C	34	Theresa Ekhelar	6 ft 6 in (1.98 m)	RS Jr	Life Center Academy	Woodbridge, NJ
F	55	Krys McCune	6 ft 4 in (1.93 m)	RS Fr	duPont Manual	Louisville, KY
G		Lucky Rudd (redshirt)	5 ft 9 in (1.75 m)	So	New Hope Christian Academy; NC State	Thomasville, NC

Head coach

- Mike Carey (Salem)

Assistant coach(es)

- Chester Nichols (Greenville)
- Lester Rowe (West Virginia)
- Christal Caldwell (West Virginia)

Legend

- (C) Team captain
- (S) Suspended
- (I) Ineligible
- (W) Walk-on
- Injured
- Current redshirt

Roster
Last update: February 3, 2018

== Schedule ==
Date time, TV	Rank^{#}	Opponent^{#}	Result	Record	Site (attendance) city, state
Exhibition
10/29/2017*; 4:00 pm	No. 13	West Virginia Wesleyan	W 113–54		WVU Coliseum (1,685); Morgantown, WV
Non-Conference Games
11/10/2017*; 7:00 pm	No. 13	Central Connecticut	W 102–52	1–0	WVU Coliseum (1,359); Morgantown, WV
11/14/2017*; 7:00 pm	No. 12	Sacramento State	W 101–47	2–0	WVU Coliseum (1,211); Morgantown, WV
11/19/2017*; 5:00 pm	No. 12	North Florida	W 87–59	3–0	WVU Coliseum (1,156); Morgantown, WV
11/23/2017*; 12:00 pm	No. 11	vs. Butler; Paradise Jam Island Division	W 75–68	4–0	Titan Field House; Melbourne, FL
11/24/2017*; 3:30 pm	No. 11	vs. Drexel; Paradise Jam Island Division	W 75–42	5–0	Titan Field House; Melbourne, FL
11/25/2017*; 6:00 pm	No. 11	vs. Virginia Tech; Paradise Jam Island Division	W 79–61	6–0	Titan Field House (276); Melbourne, FL
12/03/2017*; 8:00 pm, ESPNU	No. 11	at No. 18 Texas A&M; Big 12/SEC Women's Challenge	W 70–56	7–0	Reed Arena (3,391); College Station, TX
12/07/2017*; 7:00 pm	No. 10	Pittsburgh	W 73–52	8–0	WVU Coliseum (2,005); Morgantown, WV
12/10/2017*; 2:00 pm	No. 10	Coppin State	W 101–43	9–0	WVU Coliseum (1,163); Morgantown, WV
12/16/2017*; 4:00 pm	No. 10	vs. Radford	W 75–55	10–0	Charleston Civic Center (1,807); Charleston, WV
12/18/2017*; 7:00 pm	No. 9	Morgan State	W 84–41	11–0	WVU Coliseum (1,034); Morgantown, WV
12/21/2017*; 7:00 pm	No. 9	Morehead State	W 66–52	12–0	WVU Coliseum (2,066); Morgantown, WV
Conference Games
12/28/2017; 7:00 pm, ATTPT	No. 9	at TCU	W 87–82	13–0 (1–0)	Schollmaier Arena (1,799); Fort Worth, TX
12/31/2017; 4:30 pm, FSN	No. 9	at No. 8 Texas	L 58–79	13–1 (1–1)	Frank Erwin Center (3,391); Austin, TX
01/03/2018; 7:00 pm, Netstar	No. 12	Kansas State	L 52–60	13–2 (1–2)	WVU Coliseum (1,440); Morgantown, WV
01/07/2018; 2:00 pm, ATTPT	No. 12	Iowa State	W 57–49	14–2 (2–2)	WVU Coliseum (2,580); Morgantown, WV
01/07/2018; 8:00 pm, ESPN3	No. 15	at Kansas	W 74–54	15–2 (3–2)	Allen Fieldhouse (1,536); Lawrence, KS
01/13/2017; 5:00 pm, FSN	No. 15	TCU	L 74–76 ^{OT}	15–3 (3–3)	WVU Coliseum (3,139); Morgantown, WV
01/17/2018; 8:00 pm	No. 17	at No. 24 Oklahoma State	L 73–79	15–4 (3–4)	Gallagher-Iba Arena (1,520); Stillwater, OK
01/20/2018; 7:30 pm	No. 17	at Iowa State	W 69–59	16–4 (4–4)	Hilton Coliseum (10,067); Ames, IA
01/24/2018; 7:00 pm, Netstar	No. 20	Texas Tech	W 82–52	17–4 (5–4)	WVU Coliseum (1,987); Morgantown, WV
01/28/2018; 3:00 pm, FS1	No. 20	No. 3 Baylor	L 72–83	17–5 (5–5)	WVU Coliseum (5,073); Morgantown, WV
01/31/2018; 3:00 pm, FSOK	No. 21	at Oklahoma	L 57–76	17–6 (5–6)	Lloyd Noble Center (3,490); Norman, OK
02/05/2018; 7:00 pm, FS1		No. 6 Texas	L 55–73	17–7 (5–7)	WVU Coliseum (2,149); Morgantown, WV
02/10/2018; 3:00 pm, FSSW		at Texas Tech	W 74–60	18–7 (6–7)	United Supermarkets Arena (3,116); Lubbock, TX
02/14/2018; 7:00 pm		Kansas	W 76–46	19–7 (7–7)	WVU Coliseum (1,880); Morgantown, WV
02/17/2018; 3:00 pm, ATTPT		Oklahoma	L 77–79 ^{OT}	19–8 (7–8)	WVU Coliseum (4,326); Morgantown, WV
02/20/2018; 8:00 pm		at Kansas State	W 75–66	20–8 (8–8)	Bramlage Coliseum (3,452); Manhattan, KS
02/24/2018; 1:00 pm		No. 25 Oklahoma State	L 69–79	20–9 (8–9)	WVU Coliseum (4,058); Morgantown, WV
02/26/2018; 9:00 pm, FS1		at No. 3 Baylor	L 54–80	20–10 (8–10)	Ferrell Center (6,671); Waco, TX
Big 12 Women's Tournament
03/03/2018; 9:30 pm, FSN	(6)	vs. (3) Oklahoma State; Quarterfinals	W 69–60	21–10	Chesapeake Energy Arena (3,676); Oklahoma City, OK
03/04/2018; 5:30 pm, FS1	(6)	vs. (2) No. 7 Texas; Semifinals	L 55–68	21–11	Chesapeake Energy Arena (3,832); Oklahoma City, OK
WNIT
03/15/2018*; 7:00 pm		Bucknell; First Round	W 83–50	22–11	WVU Coliseum (1,509); Morgantown, WV
03/17/2018*; 2:00 pm		Saint Joseph's; Second Round	W 79–51	23–11	WVU Coliseum (1,651); Morgantown, WV
03/22/2018*; 5:30 pm		James Madison; Third Round	W 67–55	24–11	WVU Coliseum (1,709); Morgantown, WV
03/25/2018*; 4:00 pm		St. John's; Quarterfinals	W 76–62	25–11	WVU Coliseum (2,280); Morgantown, WV
03/28/2018*; 7:00 pm		Virginia Tech; Semifinals	L 61–64	25–12	WVU Coliseum (3,015); Morgantown, WV
*Non-conference game. ^{#}Rankings from AP Poll. (#) Tournament seedings in parentheses. All times are in Eastern Time.

== Rankings ==
2017–18 NCAA Division I women's basketball rankings

Regular season polls
Poll	Pre- Season	Week 2	Week 3	Week 4	Week 5	Week 6	Week 7	Week 8	Week 9	Week 10	Week 11	Week 12	Week 13	Week 14	Week 15	Week 16	Week 17	Week 18	Week 19	Final
AP	13	12	11	11	10	10	9	9	12	15	17	20	21	RV	RV	RV	NR	RV	RV	N/A
Coaches	15	N/A	13	12	11	11	9	9	11	15	16	19	21	RV	RV	RV	RV	NR	NR	NR

Legend
	Increase in ranking
	Decrease in ranking
	No change
(RV)	Received votes
(NR)	Not ranked

== See also ==
- 2017–18 West Virginia Mountaineers men's basketball team
