= 2017–18 Texas A&M Aggies women's basketball team =

Intercollegiate basketball season

2017–18 Texas A&M Aggies women's basketball

NCAA tournament, Sweet Sixteen
- Conference: Southeastern Conference

Ranking
- Coaches: No. 11
- AP: No. 14
- Record: 26–10 (11–5 SEC)
- Head coach: Gary Blair (15th season)
- Assistant coaches: Kelly Bond-White; Bob Starkey; Amy Wright
- Home arena: Reed Arena

2017–18 SEC women's basketball standings
	Conf.				Overall
Team	W		L	PCT	W		L	PCT
No. 4 Mississippi State	16	–	0	1.000	37	–	2	.949
No. 7 South Carolina †	12	–	4	.750	29	–	7	.806
No. 18 Georgia	12	–	4	.750	26	–	7	.788
No. 12 Tennessee	11	–	5	.688	25	–	8	.758
No. 17 Missouri	11	–	5	.688	24	–	8	.750
No. 14 Texas A&M	11	–	5	.688	26	–	10	.722
No. 24 LSU	11	–	5	.688	19	–	10	.655
Alabama	7	–	9	.438	20	–	14	.588
Kentucky	6	–	10	.375	15	–	17	.469
Auburn	5	–	11	.313	14	–	15	.483
Arkansas	3	–	13	.188	13	–	18	.419
Florida	3	–	13	.188	11	–	19	.367
Vanderbilt	3	–	13	.188	7	–	24	.226
Ole Miss	1	–	15	.063	12	–	19	.387
† 2018 SEC tournament winner As of April 1, 2018; Rankings from AP poll

The 2017–18 Texas A&M Aggies women's basketball team represented Texas A&M University in the 2017–18 NCAA Division I women's basketball season. The team's head coach was Gary Blair, who was in his fifteenth season at Texas A&M. The team played their home games at the Reed Arena in College Station, Texas and played in its sixth season as a member of the Southeastern Conference. They finished the season 26–10, 11–5 in SEC play to finish in a 4 way tie for fourth place. They advanced to the semifinals of the SEC women's tournament, where they lost to Mississippi State. They received an at-large bid to the NCAA tournament, where they defeated Drake and DePaul in the first and second rounds before losing to Notre Dame in the sweet sixteen.

== Roster ==
2017–18 Texas A&M Aggies women's basketball team
Players
Coaches

Pos.	#	Name	Height	Year	Previous school	Hometown
C	00	Khaalia Hillsman	6 ft 5 in (1.96 m)	Sr	Whitney Young	Chicago, IL
G	1	Aahliyah Jackson	5 ft 10 in (1.78 m)	So	Northside	Fort Smith, AR
G	2	Aaliyah Wilson	5 ft 11 in (1.8 m)	So	Muskogee	Muskogee, OK
G	3	Chennedy Carter	5 ft 7 in (1.7 m)	Fr	Mansfield Timberview	Mansfield, TX
G	4	Lulu McKinney	5 ft 7 in (1.7 m)	RS Sr	A&M Consolidated	Houston, TX
F	5	Anriel Howard	5 ft 11 in (1.8 m)	Jr	Westlake	Atlanta, GA
G	11	Kayla Wells	6 ft 0 in (1.83 m)	RS Fr	South Grand Prairie	Dallas, TX
G	12	Danni Williams	5 ft 10 in (1.78 m)	Jr	Clovis	Clovis, NM
G	14	Jada Walton	5 ft 11 in (1.8 m)	Fr	Southwest DeKalb	Lithonia, GA
G	15	Jasmine Williams	5 ft 10 in (1.78 m)	So	Cy-Woods	Houston, TX
F	21	Jasmine Lumpkin	6 ft 0 in (1.83 m)	RS Sr	Joliet Academy	Bolingbrook, IL
C	30	Emer Nichols	6 ft 5 in (1.96 m)	Fr	Westbury Christian	Pearland, TX
F	31	N'dea Jones	6 ft 2 in (1.88 m)	Fr	Brookwood	Lawrenceville, GA
F	34	Caylinne Martin	6 ft 3 in (1.91 m)	Jr	Langham Creek; McLennan CC	Houston, TX
C	40	Ciera Johnson	6 ft 4 in (1.93 m)	So	Duncanville	Duncanville

Head coach

- Gary Blair (Texas Tech)

Assistant coach(es)

- Kelly Bond-White (Illinois)
- Bob Starkey (LSU)
- Amy Wright (Arkansas)

Legend

- (C) Team captain
- (S) Suspended
- (I) Ineligible
- (W) Walk-on
- Injured
- Current redshirt

Roster

== Rankings ==
Ranking movements Legend: ██ Increase in ranking ██ Decrease in ranking RV = Received votes т = Tied with team above or below
	Week																			
Poll	Pre	1	2	3	4	5	6	7	8	9	10	11	12	13	14	15	16	17	18	Final
AP	20T	20T	19	19	18	21	19	19	22	19	17	16	15	14	14	17T	17	15	14	Not released
Coaches	RV	25^	21	22	22	20	21т	22	19	16	17	15	12	14	18	18	16	15	14	11

^Coaches' Poll did not release a second poll at the same time as the AP.

== Schedule and results ==
Date time, TV	Rank^{#}	Opponent^{#}	Result	Record	Site (attendance) city, state
Exhibition
11/06/2017*; 7:00 pm	No. 20	Oklahoma City	W 86–35		Reed Arena (2,703); College Station, TX
Non-conference regular season
11/10/2017*; 6:00 pm	No. 20	Houston; Preseason WNIT First Round	W 83–65	1–0	Reed Arena (3,085); College Station, TX
11/12/2017*; 2:00 pm	No. 20	Louisiana; Preseason WNIT quarterfinals	W 83–62	2–0	Reed Arena (2,867); College Station, TX
11/16/2017*; 7:00 pm	No. 19	No. 10 Oregon; Preseason WNIT semifinals	L 68–83	2–1	Reed Arena (3,315); College Station, TX
11/22/2017*; 6:00 pm	No. 19	Little Rock	W 66–49	3–1	Reed Arena (3,123); College Station, TX
11/26/2017*; 2:00 pm, FSSW	No. 19	at Texas Tech	W 90–56	4–1	United Supermarkets Arena (4,047); Lubbock, TX
11/28/2017*; 7:00 pm	No. 18	Prairie View A&M	W 98–70	5–1	Reed Arena (2,815); College Station, TX
11/29/2017*; 7:00 pm	No. 18	Rice	W 82–76	6–1	Reed Arena (3,009); College Station, TX
12/03/2017*; 7:00 pm, ESPNU	No. 18	No. 11 West Virginia; Big 12/SEC Women's Challenge	L 50–76	6–2	Reed Arena (3,391); College Station, TX
12/06/2017*; 11:00 am, SECN	No. 21	TCU; Maggie Dixon Classic	W 71–58	7–2	Reed Arena (7,180); College Station, TX
12/09/2017*; 1:00 pm	No. 21	Central Arkansas	W 72–61	8–2	Reed Arena (3,886); College Station, TX
12/15/2017*; 9:00 pm, P12N	No. 19	at USC	W 75–74	9–2	Galen Center (508); Los Angeles, CA
12/20/2017*; 2:00 pm	No. 19	vs. Hawaii; Duel in the Desert	W 103–59	10–2	Cox Pavilion; Las Vegas, NV
12/21/2017*; 2:00 pm	No. 19	vs. No. 10 Oregon; Duel in the Desert	L 62–84	10–3	Cox Pavilion; Las Vegas, NV
12/28/2017*; 7:00 pm	No. 22	SMU	W 79–57	11–3	Reed Arena (4,316); College Station, TX
Conference Games
12/31/2017; 1:00 pm, SECN	No. 22	at No. 4 South Carolina	L 59–61	11–4 (0–1)	Colonial Life Arena (13,431); Columbia, SC
01/04/2018; 6:00 pm, SECN	No. 19	Kentucky	W 74–70	12–4 (1–1)	Reed Arena (3,662); College Station, TX
01/07/2018; 2:00 pm	No. 19	at Auburn	W 82–73	13–4 (2–1)	Auburn Arena (1,980); Auburn, AL
01/11/2018; 6:00 pm, SECN	No. 17	No. 6 Tennessee	W 79–76 ^{OT}	14–4 (3–1)	Reed Arena (5,043); College Station, TX
01/14/2018; 2:00 pm, SECN	No. 17	Georgia	L 84–92 ^{OT}	14–5 (3–2)	Reed Arena (4,702); College Station, TX
01/18/2016; 7:00 pm	No. 16	Alabama	W 73–54	15–5 (4–2)	Coleman Coliseum (2,117); Tuscaloosa, AL
01/22/2018; 6:00 pm, SECN	No. 15	LSU	W 69–59	16–5 (5–2)	Reed Arena (3,506); College Station, TX
01/28/2018; 2:00 pm, SECN	No. 15	at Vanderbilt	W 91–67	17–5 (6–2)	Memorial Gymnasium (3,009); Nashville, TN
02/01/2018; 5:30 pm, SECN	No. 14	at No. 12 Tennessee	L 67–82	17–6 (6–3)	Thompson–Boling Arena (8,841); Knoxville, TN
02/04/2018; 3:00 pm, SECN	No. 14	Auburn	W 78–59	18–6 (7–3)	Reed Arena (5,127); College Station, TX
02/08/2018; 7:00 pm	No. 14	Ole Miss	W 83–54	19–6 (8–3)	Reed Arena (3,252); College Station, TX
02/11/2018; 2:00 pm	No. 14	at LSU	L 78–80	19–7 (8–4)	Maravich Center (2,103); Baton Rouge, LA
02/15/2018; 7:00 pm	No. 17	Florida	W 85–80	20–7 (9–4)	Reed Arena (4,000); College Station, TX
02/18/2018; 4:00 pm, ESPN2	No. 17	at No. 2 Mississippi State	L 55–76	20–8 (9–5)	Humphrey Coliseum (9,933); Starkville, MS
02/22/2018; 7:00 pm, SECN	No. 17	at Arkansas	W 104–60	21–8 (10–5)	Bud Walton Arena (1,375); Fayettveille, AR
02/25/2018; 3:00 pm, SECN	No. 17	No. 11 Missouri	W 82–63	22–8 (11–5)	Reed Arena (6,627); College Station, TX
SEC Women's Tournament
03/01/2018; 2:30 pm, SECN	(5) No. 15	vs. (13) Arkansas; Second Round	W 82–52	23–8	Bridgestone Arena (3,889); Nashville, TN
03/02/2018; 2:30 pm, SECN	(5) No. 15	vs. (4) No. 24 LSU; Quarterfinals	W 75–69	24–8	Bridgestone Arena (6,344); Nashville, TN
03/03/2018; 4:00 pm, ESPNU	(5) No. 15	vs. (1) No. 2 Mississippi State; Semifinals	L 55–70	24–9	Bridgestone Arena; Nashville, TN
NCAA Women's Tournament
03/16/2018*; 1:30 pm, ESPN2	(4 S) No. 14	(13 S) Drake; First Round	W 89–76	25–9	Reed Arena (2,835); College Station, TX
03/18/2018*; 1:00 pm, ESPN2	(4 S) No. 14	(5 S) DePaul; Second Round	W 80–79	26–9	Reed Arena (3,162); College Station, TX
03/24/2018*; 3:00 pm, ESPN	(4 S) No. 14	vs. (1 S) No. 5 Notre Dame; Sweet Sixteen	L 84–90	26–10	Spokane Arena; Spokane, WA
*Non-conference game. ^{#}Rankings from AP Poll. (#) Tournament seedings in parentheses. S=Spokane Region. All times are in Central Time.
