= 2017 Paradise Jam =

Men's and women's college basketball tournament

- Season: 2017–18
- Teams: 8
- Finals site: Vines Center, Lynchburg, Virginia (men's); Charles E. Smith Center, Washington, D.C. (women's Reef); Titan Field House, Melbourne, Florida (women's Island),
- Champions: Colorado (men's); West Virginia (women's Island); Syracuse (women's Reef)
- MVP: McKinley Wright IV, Colorado (men's); Teanna Muldrow, West Virginia (women's Island); Tiana Mangakahia, Syracuse (women's Reef)

The 2017 Paradise Jam was an early-season men's and women's college basketball tournament. The tournament, which began in 2000, was part of the 2017–18 NCAA Division I men's basketball season and 2017–18 NCAA Division I women's basketball season. The tournaments are normally held at Saint Thomas, Virgin Islands at the Sports and Fitness Center on the campus of the University of the Virgin Islands. However, due to major damage to the Virgin Islands from Hurricane Irma and Hurricane Maria, the tournaments were moved to the U.S. mainland. Tournament organizers solicited hosting bids from all schools in the men's and women's tournaments, with each tournament originally intended to be awarded to one of its participating schools. The substitute host for on September 29, 2017, it was announced that the Vines Center on the campus of Liberty University in Lynchburg, Virginia, would host the men's tournament. On October 4, The women's tournament which is organized into two separate four team round four-team tournaments, was The Reef division will be held at the Charles E. Smith Center on the campus of George Washington University in Washington, D.C., while the Island division will be held at Titan Field House on the campus of Eastern Florida State College in Melbourne, Florida. Colorado won the men's tournament, in the women's tournament West Virginia won the Island Division and Syracuse won the Reef Division.

== Men's tournament ==
=== Bracket ===
* – Denotes overtime period

==== Campus Site Games ====
November 10
Clarks Summit	42
Liberty	87

==== Championship Round ====
5th Place Game; November 19
Houston	78
Wake Forest	73
7th Place Game
Liberty	84
Quinnipiac	72

Consolation 2nd Round; November 18
Liberty	66
Houston	68
Quinnipiac	55
Wake Forest	72

First Round; November 17
Mercer	63
Liberty	48
Drexel	84
Houston	80
Quinnipiac	69
Colorado	70
Drake	77
Wake Forest	74

Semifinals; November 18
Mercer	78
Drexel	59
Colorado	86
Drake	81

Championship; November 19
Mercer	70
Colorado	79
3rd Place Game
Drexel	88
Drake	90**

== Women's tournament ==
The women's tournament was played between November 23–25. The women's tournament consists of 8 teams split into two 4-team, round-robin divisions: Island and Reef.

=== Island Division ===
West Virginia took on Butler in the opening day of the Island Division. The Mountaineers started out strong scoring 10 points before Butler scored, and held a 16–7 lead at the end of the first quarter. West Virginia's Naomi Davenport Recorded a double double with 12 points and 11 rebounds by halftime. Butler didn't back down and cut the nine point lead to five by halftime. In the second half Butler took a one-point lead with just over two minutes to go, but West Virginia responded with consecutive three-pointers by Teanna Muldrow and Chania Ray. Butler was forced to foul and Muldrow sealed the win making four consecutive free throws. West Virginia ended up winning 75–68.

In the other Island Division game, Virginia Tech took on Drexel. The Hokies outscored the Dragons in each of the first two quarters, and went into halftime with an 11-point lead 40–29. However Drexel fought back and took the lead 46–45. The team's exchanged baskets and the lead changed, but Taylor Emery hit a three-point jumper to break a 49–49 tie. The Hokies led at the end of the third quarter but Drexel came back with back to back baskets to take one point lead at 60–59. Virginia Tech took the lead back and never gave it up, ending up with a 79–67 win. Each team had four players with double digit scoring, but Emery of Virginia Tech led all scores with 25 to help secure the win.

On the second day of the tournament, West Virginia took on Drexel. The game was never close with the Mountaineers opening up a seven-point lead in the first quarter, extending it to an 18-point lead at halftime, and further extending the lead in the third and fourth quarters. West Virginia hit 56% of the field-goal attempts including six of their 83-point attempts. West Virginia's Teana Muldrow scored 25. The Mountaineers held Drexel to 30% shooting from the field and forcing 24 turnovers. West Virginia beat Drexel 75–42.

The other Island Division game was a much closer game. Butler led much of the first half but Virginia Tech came back to tie the score at 37 apiece at halftime. Butler outscored Virginia Tech by only a single point in the third quarter and another single point in the fourth quarter to escape with a narrow two point win 79–77. Emery scored 20 points for Virginia Tech, but Butler got 27 points from Schickel as well as 20 points off the bench from Spolyar.

West Virginia faced Virginia Tech on the final day. All five starters for West Virginia scored in double figures. The team never trailed and ended up with a 79–61 win over Virginia Tech, which earned the Mountaineers the Island Division title, West Virginia's Chania Ray hit five three-pointers helping her earn a spot on the all tournament team, while Teana Muldrow had 23 points along with 11 rebounds claiming Island division MVP. Regan Magarity of Virginia Tech was the high scorer for the Hokies with 18 points.

Drexel took on Butler in the other game in the Island Division. Although Butler's Whitney Jennings scored 28 points for the Bulldogs, Drexel got double-digit scoring from four of their five starters, opening up an eight-point lead at the half and extending it in the second half to end up with an 76–62 win.

November 22
Butler	68
West Virginia	75

November 22
Drexel	67
Virginia Tech	79

November 23
Butler	79
Virginia Tech	77

November 23
Drexel	42
West Virginia	75

November 24
West Virginia	71
Virginia Tech	69

November 24
Butler	62
Drexel	76

==== Island Division All-Tournament team ====
- Teanna Muldrow, West Virginia MVP
- Aubree Brown, Drexel
- Tori Schickel, Butler
- Taylor Emery, Virginia Tech
- Chania Ray, West Virginia

=== Reef Division ===
The opening day game between Syracuse and Wisconsin in the Reef Division was a nailbiter. These two teams had never played before. The game had 11 lead changes and neither team ever mounted a large lead. Syracuse had a three-point lead near the end of the game when Wisconsin's Suzanne Gilreath attempted a three-point shot with two seconds left which would have sent the game to overtime. The shot did not go in and Syracuse prevailed 77–74.

George Washington and Vanderbilt squared off in the other Reef Division opening day game. The game was close into the second quarter, with Vanderbilt holding only a one-point margin, when the Commodores held the Colonials scoreless for the last four minutes of quarter while scoring nine points of their own to go up 10 at halftime. Vanderbilt maintained then expanded their lead in the second half to almost 20 points. George Washington narrowed the lead near the end of the game but could get it no closer than 10 points, The Commodores won 69–59.

George Washington faced Wisconsin on the second day. The colonials were up by a single point at the end of the first quarter but turned up their defense and held the Badgers to a single basket in the second quarter, outscoring them 15–3. Wisconsin cut into the lead in the second half closing to within seven points, but the Colonials clamped down on defense and increased the lead, ending with a 61–46 victory.

Syracuse took on Vanderbilt in a game that was much closer than the final score indicated. In the first half the scoring margin never exceeded four points, and the half ended with Vanderbilt up by a single point. Both extended the lead to six in the second half but then Syracuse came back and opened up as much as a nine-point lead. Vanderbilt came back within one, fell behind again, but then retook the lead 76–75 with under two minutes left. Tiana Mangakahia hit a layup to give Syracuse a one-point lead that started a 7–2 run to close out the game with an 84–78 Commodore victory. Mangakahia recorded 17 assists to set a single-game record for the program. The win gave Syracuse a 5–0 start to the season, their first perfect start in four years.

Wisconsin took on Vanderbilt in the finale of the Reef Division. The game was extremely close throughout the contest, with Wisconsin holding a three-point lead with about two and half minutes to go in regulation. Vanderbilt scored three points to tie the game at 69 points apiece with a 1:22 left. Neither team was able to score so the game went to overtime. Overtime stated with scoreless for almost 3 minutes when Vanderbilt took a two-point lead. Wisconsin respond to tie it up and then hit the go-ahead layup with just over a minute to go. Vanderbilt had two late shots to tie the game but they failed to go in so Wisconsin ended up winning 73–71 in Overtime.

In the other final game of the Reef Division, Syracuse faced George Washington. The Orange opened strong scoring the first 15 points of the game. Although the Colonials would outscore the Orange from that point on they were unable to climb out of the hole and Syracuse ended up winning 74–62, giving Syracuse the Reef Division championship.

November 22
Syracuse	77
Wisconsin	74

November 22
Vanderbilt	69
George Washington	59

November 23
George Washington	61
Wisconsin	46

November 23
Vanderbilt	84
Syracuse	78

November 24
Vanderbilt	71
Wisconsin	73*

November 24
Syracuse	74
George Washington	62

==== Reef Division All Tournament Team ====
- Tiana Mangakahia, Syracuse MVP
- Cayla McMorris, Wisconsin
- Rachel Bell, Vanderbilt
- Kelli Prange, George Washington
- Miranda Drummond, Syracuse
