= 2017–18 Iowa State Cyclones women's basketball team =

Intercollegiate basketball season

2017–18 Iowa State Cyclones women's basketball
- Conference: Big 12 Conference
- Record: 14–17 (7–11 Big 12)
- Head coach: Bill Fennelly (23rd season)
- Assistant coaches: Jodi Styer; Latoja Schaben; Billy Fennelly
- Home arena: Hilton Coliseum

2017–18 Big 12 Conference women's basketball standings
	Conf.				Overall
Team	W		L	PCT	W		L	PCT
No. 2 Baylor †	18	–	0	1.000	33	–	2	.943
No. 8 Texas	15	–	3	.833	28	–	7	.800
Oklahoma State	11	–	7	.611	21	–	11	.656
Oklahoma	11	–	7	.611	16	–	15	.516
TCU	9	–	9	.500	23	–	13	.639
West Virginia	8	–	10	.444	25	–	12	.676
Iowa State	7	–	11	.389	14	–	17	.452
Kansas State	7	–	11	.389	18	–	16	.529
Kansas	3	–	15	.167	12	–	18	.400
Texas Tech	1	–	17	.056	7	–	23	.233
† 2018 Big 12 Tournament winner Rankings from AP poll

The 2017–18 Iowa State Cyclones women's basketball team represented Iowa State University during the 2017–18 NCAA Division I women's basketball season. The Cyclones were coached by Bill Fennelly, who was in his twenty-third season at Iowa State. They played their home games at Hilton Coliseum in Ames, Iowa as members of the Big 12 Conference. They finished the season 14–17, 7–11 in Big 12 play to finish in a tie for seventh place. They advanced to the quarterfinals of the Big 12 women's tournament, where they lost to Texas.

== Previous season ==
The Cyclones finished the 2016–17 season 18-13, 9-9 in Big 12 play to finish in fifth place. They fell to Kansas State in the 2017 Big 12 Conference women's basketball tournament. The team was able to qualify for the NCAA tournament as a No. 9 seed at-large team. They lost to Syracuse in the First Round of the NCAA Tournament

=== Departures ===
Offseason departures
Name	Position	Reason
Seanna Johnson	Guard	Graduated
Lexi Albrecht	Guard	Graduated
Jordan Jensen	Forward	Graduated
Jadda Buckley	Guard	Graduated
Sofija Zivaljevic	Forward	Transferred
Heather Bowe	Forward	Graduated
TeeTee Starks	Guard	Transferred

=== 2018–19 team recruits ===
College recruiting information (2018)
Name	Hometown	School	Height	Weight	Commit date
Morgan Kane; F	Riverton, UT	Riverton High School	6 ft 3 in (1.91 m)	N/A	
Morgan Kane; F	Recruit ratings: No ratings found				
Ashley Joens; G	Iowa City, IA	City High School	5 ft 9 in (1.75 m)	N/A	
Ashley Joens; G	Recruit ratings: No ratings found				
Maddie Frederick; G	Tipp City, OH	Tippecanoe High School	6 ft 0 in (1.83 m)	N/A	
Maddie Frederick; G	Recruit ratings: No ratings found				
Overall recruit ranking:
Note: In many cases, Scout, Rivals, 247Sports, On3, and ESPN may conflict in their listings of height and weight.; In these cases, the average was taken. ESPN grades are on a 100-point scale.; Sources: "2018 Team Ranking". Rivals.

== Roster ==
2017–18 Iowa State Cyclones women's basketball team
Players
Coaches

Pos.	#	Name	Height	Year	Previous school	Hometown
F	1	Madison Wise	6 ft 1 in (1.85 m)	Fr	Greenfield-Central	Greenfield, IN
G	3	Emily Durr	6 ft 0 in (1.83 m)	Sr	Notre Dame	Utica, NY
G	4	Rae Johnson	5 ft 7 in (1.7 m)	Fr	St. Michael-Albertville	Albertville, MN
G	10	Nia Washington	5 ft 7 in (1.7 m)	So	Riverdale Baptist	Stafford, VA
F	12	Bride Kennedy-Hopoate	6 ft 4 in (1.93 m)	Jr	Hutchinson CC	Brisbane, Australia
F	13	Adriana Camber	5 ft 10 in (1.78 m)	So	Katedralskolan	Lund, Sweden
F/C	14	Lauren Mills (redshirt)	6 ft 2 in (1.88 m)	Fr	Rosny College	Hobart, Australia
G	21	Bridget Carleton	6 ft 1 in (1.85 m)	Jr	John McGregor Secondary	Chatham, ON
C	25	Kristan Scott	6 ft 3 in (1.91 m)	Fr	Kasson-Mantorville	Kasson, MN
F	30	Claire Ricketts	6 ft 3 in (1.91 m)	RS Sr	John Paul II	Parker, TX
F	32	Meredith Burkhall	6 ft 3 in (1.91 m)	Jr	Roosevelt	Urbandale, IA
G	33	Alexa Middleton (redshirt)	5 ft 9 in (1.75 m)	Sr	Riverdale HS; Tennessee	Murfreesboro, TN

Head coach

- Bill Fennelly (William Penn)

Assistant coach(es)

- Jodi Steyer (Colorado State)
- Latoja Schaben (Toledo)
- Billy Fennelly (Iowa State)

Legend

- (C) Team captain
- (S) Suspended
- (I) Ineligible
- (W) Walk-on
- Injured
- Current redshirt

Roster

== Schedule and results ==
Date time, TV	Rank^{#}	Opponent^{#}	Result	Record	High points	High rebounds	High assists	Site (attendance) city, state
Exhibition
November 5, 2017*; 12:00 pm, Cyclones.tv		UW–La Crosse	W 93–50		17 – Carleton	6 – Burkhall	6 – Johnson	Hilton Coliseum (9,508); Ames, IA
Regular Season
November 10, 2017*; 12:00 pm, Cyclones.tv		South Dakota	W 81–76	1–0	24 – Carleton	9 – Scott	4 – 2 tied	Hilton Coliseum (9,143); Ames, IA
November 14, 2017*; 7:00 pm, ESPN3		at Northern Iowa	L 53–57	1–1	18 – Carleton	7 – 2 tied	5 – Carleton	McLeod Center (2,099); Cedar Falls, IA
November 20, 2017*; 6:30 pm, Cyclones.tv		UMKC	W 61–45	2–1	15 – Wise	15 – Wise	3 – 3 tied	Hilton, Coliseum (9,603); Ames, IA
November 24, 2017*; 2:00 pm, Flohoops		vs. Tulane; Junkanoo Jam Bimini Division semifinals	W 67–64	3–1	19 – 2 tied	10 – Scott	5 – Carleton	Gateway Christian Academy; Bimini, Bahamas
November 25, 2017*; 5:45 pm, Flohoops		vs. Central Michigan; Junkanoo Jam Bimini Division championship	L 60–81	3–2	19 – Carleton	9 – Scott	4 – 2 tied	Gateway Christian Academy; Bimini, Bahamas
November 30, 2017*; 7:00 pm, MC22/ESPN3		at Drake	L 80–83	3–3	21 – Durr	7 – Carleton	5 – Carleton	Knapp Center (3,212); Des Moines, IA
December 2, 2017*; 3:00 pm, SECN		at Vanderbilt; Big 12/SEC Women's Challenge	L 74–77	3–4	30 – Carleton	8 – 2 tied	6 – Durr	Memorial Gymnasium; Nashville, TN
December 6, 2017*; 6:30 pm, Cyclones.tv		Iowa; Iowa Corn Cy-Hawk Series	L 55–61	3–5	17 – Carleton	7 – Carleton	6 – Carleton	Hilton Coliseum (10,916); Ames, IA
December 10, 2017*; 12:00 pm, Cyclones.tv		North Carolina Central	W 99–58	4–5	21 – Carleton	7 – Scott	9 – Durr	Hilton Coliseum (9,664); Ames, IA
December 17, 2017*; 2:00 pm, Cyclones.tv		UC Riverside	W 89–66	5–5	19 – Wise	10 – Carleton	9 – Johnson	Hilton, Coliseum (9,508); Ames, IA
December 21, 2017*; 1:00 pm, Cyclones.tv		Nicholls State	W 75–47	6–5	18 – Wise	10 – Scott	6 – Carleton	Hilton Coliseum (9,466); Ames, IA
Big 12 Conference Season
December 28, 2017; 6:30 pm, Cyclones.tv		Kansas	W 71–69	7–5 (1–0)	30 – Carleton	9 – 2 tied	3 – 2 tied	Hilton Coliseum (9,764); Ames, IA
December 31, 2017; 2:00 pm, Cyclones.tv		Oklahoma	L 69–74	7–6 (1–1)	21 – Carleton	9 – Carleton	4 – Durr	Hilton Coliseum (9,791); Ames, IA
January 3, 2018; 7:00 pm, FSSW+		at No. 6 Baylor	L 49–89	7–7 (1–2)	15 – Carleton	5 – 2 tied	2 – Scott	Ferrell Center (5,113); Waco, TX
January 7, 2018; 1:00 pm		at No. 12 West Virginia	L 49–57	7–8 (1–3)	14 – Carleton	9 – Scott	4 – Carleton	WVU Coliseum (2,580); Morgantown, WV
January 10, 2018; 6:30 pm, Cyclones.tv		Kansas State	L 60–67	7–9 (1–4)	17 – Kennedy-Hopoate	11 – Carleton	5 – Carleton	Hilton Coliseum (9,501); Ames, IA
January 13, 2018; 6:00 pm, FSSW+		at Texas Tech	W 66–54	8–9 (2–4)	17 – Wise	6 – 3 tied	5 – Durr	United Supermarkets Arena (3,823); Lubbock, TX
January 17, 2018; 8:00 pm, FSN		No. 4 Baylor	L 50–79	8–10 (2–5)	24 – Carleton	8 – Carleton	3 – Johnson	Hilton Coliseum (9,510); Ames, IA
January 20, 2018; 6:30 pm, Cyclones.tv		No. 17 West Virginia	L 59–69	8–11 (2–6)	15 – Durr	6 – Kennedy-Hopoate	5 – Carleton	Hilton Coliseum (10,067); Ames, IA
January 24, 2018; 8:00 pm, FSN		at No. 19 Oklahoma State	W 78–69	9–11 (3–6)	39 – Carleton	9 – Carleton	4 – Durr	Gallagher-Iba Arena (1,370); Stillwater, OK
January 27, 2018; 8:00 pm, LHN		at No. 6 Texas	L 55–87	9–12 (3–7)	20 – Durr	6 – Wise	3 – Durr	Frank Erwin Center (4,446); Austin, TX
January 30, 2018; 6:30 pm, Cyclones.tv		No. 22 TCU	L 52–75	9–13 (3-8)	21 – Durr	5 – 2 tied	4 – Carleton	Hilton Coliseum (9,829); Ames, IA
February 3, 2018; 7:00 pm, ESPN3		at Kansas State	W 80–45	10–13 (4–8)	21 – Camber	13 – Burkhall	13 – Durr	Bramlage Coliseum (6,490); Manhattan, KS
February 10, 2018; 6:30 pm, Cyclones.tv		No. 22 Oklahoma State	L 73–81	10–14 (4–9)	21 – Wise	9 – Wise	5 – Johnson	Hilton Coliseum (10,148); Ames, IA
February 14, 2018; 6:30 pm, FSSW		at TCU	W 66–63	11–14 (5–9)	26 – Carleton	13 – Ricketts	6 – Durr	Schollmaier Arena (1,695); Fort Worth, TX
February 17, 2018; 3:00 pm, Cyclones.tv		Texas Tech	W 69–57	12–14 (6–9)	25 – Carleton	9 – Scott	5 – Durr	Hilton Coliseum (11,072); Ames, IA
February 21, 2018; 7:00 pm, FSSW+		at Oklahoma	L 71–80	12–15 (6–10)	22 – Durr	8 – Burkhall	4 – 2 tied	Lloyd Noble Center; Norman, OK
February 24, 2018; 5:00 pm, FSN		No. 6 Texas	L 59–72	12–16 (6–11)	23 – Carleton	6 – 2 tied	4 – 2 tied	Hilton Coliseum (10,061); Ames, IA
February 27, 2018; 7:00 pm, JTV/ESPN3		at Kansas	W 65–56	13–16 (7–11)	27 – Durr	8 – Burkhall	7 – Carleton	Allen Fieldhouse (1,840); Lawrence, KS
Big 12 Tournament
March 2, 2018; 8:30 pm, FCS	(7)	vs. (10) Texas Tech; First Round	W 74–49	14–16	24 – Carleton	10 – Wise	3 – 2 tied	Chesapeake Energy Arena (2,779); Oklahoma City, OK
March 3, 2018; 6:00 pm, FSN	(7)	vs. (2) No. 7 Texas; Quarterfinals	L 69–81	14–17	25 – 2 tied	5 – 2 tied	4 – Durr	Chesapeake Energy Arena; Oklahoma City, OK
*Non-conference game. ^{#}Rankings from AP Poll. (#) Tournament seedings in parentheses. All times are in Central Time.

== Rankings ==
Ranking movements Legend: — = Not ranked
	Week																				
Poll	Pre	1	2	3	4	5	6	7	8	9	10	11	12	13	14	15	16	17	18	19	Final
AP	—																				
Coaches	—																				

*AP does not release post-NCAA tournament rankings

== See also ==
- 2017–18 Iowa State Cyclones men's basketball team
