= 2017–18 Kansas Jayhawks women's basketball team =

Intercollegiate basketball season

2017–18 Kansas Jayhawks women's basketball
- Conference: Big 12 Conference
- Record: 12–18 (3–15 Big 12)
- Head coach: Brandon Schneider (3rd season)
- Assistant coaches: Aqua Franklin; Katie O'Connor; Damitria Buchanan
- Home arena: Allen Fieldhouse

2017–18 Big 12 Conference women's basketball standings
	Conf.				Overall
Team	W		L	PCT	W		L	PCT
No. 2 Baylor †	18	–	0	1.000	33	–	2	.943
No. 8 Texas	15	–	3	.833	28	–	7	.800
Oklahoma State	11	–	7	.611	21	–	11	.656
Oklahoma	11	–	7	.611	16	–	15	.516
TCU	9	–	9	.500	23	–	13	.639
West Virginia	8	–	10	.444	25	–	12	.676
Iowa State	7	–	11	.389	14	–	17	.452
Kansas State	7	–	11	.389	18	–	16	.529
Kansas	3	–	15	.167	12	–	18	.400
Texas Tech	1	–	17	.056	7	–	23	.233
† 2018 Big 12 Tournament winner Rankings from AP poll

The 2017–18 Kansas Jayhawks women's basketball team represented the University of Kansas in the 2017–18 NCAA Division I women's basketball season. The Jayhawks were led by third year head coach Brandon Schneider. They played their home games at Allen Fieldhouse in Lawrence, Kansas as members of the Big 12 Conference. They finished the season 12–18, 3–15 in Big 12 play to finish in ninth place. They lost in the first round of the Big 12 Tournament to Kansas State.

== Previous season ==
The Jayhawks finished the 2016–17 season 8–22, 2–16 in Big 12 play to finish in last place. They lost in the first round of the Big 12 Tournament to Oklahoma State.

== Roster ==
2017–18 Kansas Jayhawks women's basketball team
Players
Coaches

Pos.	#	Name	Height	Year	Previous school	Hometown
G	0	Christalah Lyons	5 ft 5 in (1.65 m)	Jr	Skyline; Trinity Valley CC	Dallas, TX
C	1	Chelsea Lott	6 ft 3 in (1.91 m)	Jr	Fort Bend Hightower	Fresno, TX
G	2	Brianna Osorio	5 ft 8 in (1.73 m)	Jr	Quest Academy; Southern Idaho	Las Vegas, NV
G	3	Jessica Washington	5 ft 8 in (1.73 m)	RS Sr	Jenks; North Carolina	Tulsa, OK
F	12	Micaela Wilson	6 ft 2 in (1.88 m)	Fr	Rayville	Rayville, LA
F	14	Austin Richardson	6 ft 0 in (1.83 m)	Jr	Lee's Summit West; Johnson County CC	Lee's Summit, MO
G	22	Chayla Cheadle	5 ft 11 in (1.8 m)	Sr	Rock Bridge	Columbia, MO
G	23	Eboni Watts	5 ft 6 in (1.68 m)	Sr	Rutland	Macon, GA
G	24	Sydney Benoit	5 ft 10 in (1.78 m)	Sr	Smith Center; Hutchinson CC	Smith Center, KS
C	31	Brittany Franklin	6 ft 5 in (1.96 m)	Fr	Plymouth	Plymouth, NC
G	33	Kylee Kopatich	5 ft 10 in (1.78 m)	Jr	Olathe South	Olathe, KS
C	35	Bailey Helgren	6 ft 5 in (1.96 m)	Fr	Edina	Edina, MN
C	50	Sara Boric	6 ft 5 in (1.96 m)	RS Jr	Tehnicka Skola; Northeast Oklahoma A&M	Kotor Varoš, Bosnia
F	55	Tyler Johnson	6 ft 2 in (1.88 m)	RS So	Leavenworth	Leavenworth, KS

Head coach

- Brandon Schneider (Wayland Baptist)

Assistant coach(es)

- Aqua Franklin (Texas A&M)
- Katie O'Connor (Virginia Tech)
- Damitria Buchanan (Texas A&M)

Legend

- (C) Team captain
- (S) Suspended
- (I) Ineligible
- (W) Walk-on
- Injured
- Current redshirt

Roster
Last update: February 3, 2018

== Schedule and results ==
Date time, TV	Rank^{#}	Opponent^{#}	Result	Record	Site (attendance) city, state
Exhibition
Oct 29, 2017*; 2:00 pm, JTV/ESPN3		Emporia State	W 69–49		Allen Fieldhouse (1,632); Lawrence, KS
Nov 05, 2017*; 2:00 pm, JTV/ESPN3		Pittsburg State	W 57–50		Allen Fieldhouse (1,482); Lawrence, KS
Non-conference regular season
Nov 12, 2017*; 2:00 pm, JTV/ESPN3		Campbell	W 66–48	1–0	Allen Fieldhouse (1,536); Lawrence, KS
Nov 15, 2017*; 7:00 pm, JTV/ESPN3		Texas Southern	W 72–37	2–0	Allen Fieldhouse (1,479); Lawrence, KS
Nov 19, 2017*; 1:00 pm, JTV/ESPN3		Yale	W 81–75	3–0	Allen Fieldhouse (1,918); Lawrence, KS
Nov 22, 2017*; 7:00 pm, JTV/ESPN3		Delaware State	W 81–49	4–0	Allen Fieldhouse (1,512); Lawrence, KS
Nov 26, 2017*; 1:00 pm, JTV/ESPN3		Rice	W 73–65	5–0	Allen Fieldhouse (1,546); Lawrence, KS
Nov 29, 2017*; 7:00 pm, JTV/ESPN3		UMKC	W 63–48	6–0	Allen Fieldhouse (1,261); Lawrence, KS
Dec 03, 2017*; 2:00 pm, JTV/ESPN3		Arkansas; Big 12/SEC Women's Challenge	W 71–60	7–0	Allen Fieldhouse (1,795); Lawrence, KS
Dec 06, 2017*; 7:00 pm, JTV/ESPN3		Nebraska	L 49–66	7–1	Allen Fieldhouse (2,194); Lawrence, KS
Dec 10, 2017*; 7:00 pm, JTV/ESPN3		Southeast Missouri State	W 51–50	8–1	Allen Fieldhouse (1,543); Lawrence, KS
Dec 18, 2017*; 6:00 pm, ESPN3		at St. John's	L 53–65 ^{OT}	8–2	Carnesecca Arena (690); Queens, NY
Dec 20, 2017*; 5:00 pm, ESPN3		at Iona	W 72–58	9–2	Hynes Athletic Center (593); New Rochelle, NY
Big 12 regular season
Dec 28, 2017; 6:30 pm, Cyclones.tv		at Iowa State	L 69–71	9–3 (0–1)	Hilton Coliseum (9,764); Ames, IA
Dec 31, 2017; 2:00 pm, JTV/ESPN3		TCU	W 86–77	10–3 (1–1)	Allen Fieldhouse (1,804); Lawrence, KS
Jan 03, 2018; 6:30 pm		at Texas Tech	W 60–47	11–3 (2–1)	United Supermarkets Arena (3,388); Lubbock, TX
Jan 06, 2018; 2:00 pm, JTV/ESPN3		No. 6 Baylor	L 48–83	11–4 (2–2)	Allen Fieldhouse (2,216); Lawrence, KS
Jan 10, 2018; 7:00 pm, JTV/ESPN3		No. 15 West Virginia	L 54–74	11–5 (2–3)	Allen Fieldhouse (1,536); Lawrence, KS
Jan 13, 2018; 1:00 pm		at No. 7 Texas	L 62–79	11–6 (2–4)	Frank Erwin Center (4,015); Austin, TX
Jan 17, 2018; 7:00 pm, JTV/ESPN3		Texas Tech	L 56–68	11–7 (2–5)	Allen Fieldhouse (1,556); Lawrence, KS
Jan 20, 2018; 2:00 pm		at TCU	L 66–76	11–8 (2–6)	Schollmaier Arena (2,327); Fort Worth, TX
Jan 24, 2018; 6:00 pm		at Oklahoma	L 64–97	11–9 (2–7)	Lloyd Noble Center (3,302); Norman, OK
Jan 28, 2018; 4:00 pm, FS1		Kansas State; Sunflower Showdown	L 59–63	11–10 (2–8)	Allen Fieldhouse (5,066); Lawrence, KS
Jan 31, 2018; 7:00 pm, JTV/ESPN3		No. 8 Texas	L 41–55	11–11 (2–9)	Allen Fieldhouse (1,625); Lawrence, KS
Feb 03, 2018; 7:30 pm		at No. 23 Oklahoma State	L 63–92	11–12 (2–10)	Gallagher-Iba Arena (2,346); Norman, OK
Feb 10, 2018; 7:00 pm, JTV/ESPN3		Oklahoma	L 52–72	11–13 (2–11)	Allen Fieldhouse (4,117); Lawrence, KS
Feb 14, 2018; 6:00 pm		at West Virginia	L 46–76	11–14 (2–12)	WVU Coliseum (1,880); Morgantown, WV
Feb 17, 2018; 1:00 pm		at No. 3 Baylor	L 51–88	11–15 (2–13)	Ferrell Center (6,416); Waco, TX
Feb 21, 2018; 7:00 pm, JTV/ESPN3		No. 25 Oklahoma State	W 66–59	12–15 (3–13)	Allen Fieldhouse (2,059); Lawrence, KS
Feb 24, 2018; 3:00 pm, FSN		at Kansas State; Sunflower Showdown	L 67–93	12–16 (3–14)	Bramlage Coliseum (6,037); Manhattan, KS
Feb 27, 2018; 7:00 pm, JTV/ESPN3		Iowa State	L 56–65	12–17 (3–15)	Allen Fieldhouse (1,840); Lawrence, KS
Big 12 Tournament
Mar 02, 2018; 6:00 pm, FCS	(9)	vs. (8) Kansas State; First Round	L 63–72	12–18	Chesapeake Energy Arena; Oklahoma City, OK
*Non-conference game. ^{#}Rankings from AP Poll / Coaches' Poll. (#) Tournament seedings in parentheses. All times are in Central Time.

x- All JTV games will air on Metro Sports, ESPN3 and local affiliates.

== See also ==
- 2017–18 Kansas Jayhawks men's basketball team
