= 2017–18 Texas Longhorns women's basketball team =

Intercollegiate basketball season

2017–18 Texas Longhorns women's basketball

NCAA tournament, Sweet Sixteen
- Conference: Big 12 Conference

Ranking
- Coaches: No. 10
- AP: No. 8
- Record: 28–7 (15–3 Big 12)
- Head coach: Karen Aston (6th season)
- Associate head coach: Tina Thompson
- Assistant coaches: Jamie Carey; George Washington
- Home arena: Frank Erwin Center

2017–18 Big 12 Conference women's basketball standings
	Conf.				Overall
Team	W		L	PCT	W		L	PCT
No. 2 Baylor †	18	–	0	1.000	33	–	2	.943
No. 8 Texas	15	–	3	.833	28	–	7	.800
Oklahoma State	11	–	7	.611	21	–	11	.656
Oklahoma	11	–	7	.611	16	–	15	.516
TCU	9	–	9	.500	23	–	13	.639
West Virginia	8	–	10	.444	25	–	12	.676
Iowa State	7	–	11	.389	14	–	17	.452
Kansas State	7	–	11	.389	18	–	16	.529
Kansas	3	–	15	.167	12	–	18	.400
Texas Tech	1	–	17	.056	7	–	23	.233
† 2018 Big 12 Tournament winner Rankings from AP poll

The 2017–18 Texas Longhorns women's basketball team represented the University of Texas at Austin in the 2017–18 NCAA Division I women's basketball season. It was head coach Karen Aston's sixth season at Texas. The Longhorns were members of the Big 12 Conference and played their home games at the Frank Erwin Center. They finished the season 28–7, 15–3 in Big 12 play to finish in second place. They advanced to the championship game of the Big 12 women's basketball tournament, where they lost to Baylor. They received an at-large bid to the NCAA women's basketball tournament, where they defeated Maine and Arizona State in the first and second rounds before losing to UCLA in the Sweet Sixteen.

== Previous season ==
The Longhorns were coming off a season in which they finished the season 25–9, 15–3 in Big 12 play to finish in second place and advanced to the semifinals of the Big 12 women's basketball tournament, where they lost to West Virginia. They received an at-large bid to the NCAA women's basketball tournament, where they defeated Central Arkansas and NC State in the first and second rounds before losing to Stanford in the Sweet Sixteen.

== Off-season ==
=== Departures ===
Name	Number	Pos.	Height	Year	Hometown	Reason for departure
Lang Kelsey	40	C	6'5"	Senior	The Woodlands, TX	Graduated
Brianna Taylor	20	G	5'9"	Senior	Houston, TX	Graduated
Tasia Forman	22	G	5'4"	Junior	Duncanville, TX	Transferred to Texas A&M–Corpus Christi

Joyner Holmes was not on the roster until 23 December 2017 due to an undisclosed violation.

=== Recruits ===
College recruiting
Name	Hometown	School	Height	Weight	Commit date
Destiny Littleton; G	La Jolla, CA	The Bishop's School	5 ft 9 in (1.75 m)	N/A	
Destiny Littleton; G	Recruit ratings: ESPN: (97)				
Chastity Patterson; G	Houston, TX	North Shore	5 ft 5 in (1.65 m)	N/A	
Chastity Patterson; G	Recruit ratings: ESPN: (98)				
Rellah Boothe; F	Ocala, FL	IMG Academy	6 ft 3 in (1.91 m)	N/A	
Rellah Boothe; F	Recruit ratings: ESPN: (98)				
Overall recruiting rankings:
Note: In many cases, Scout, Rivals, 247Sports, and ESPN may conflict in their listings of height and weight.; In these cases, the average was taken. ESPN grades are on a 100-point scale.; Sources: "2017 Player Commits". ESPN.com.

== Roster ==
2017–18 Texas Longhorns women's basketball team
Players
Coaches

Pos.	#	Name	Height	Year	Previous school	Hometown
G	1	Alecia Sutton	5 ft 8 in (1.73 m)	So	Parkway North	St. Louis, MO
G	4	Destiny Littleton	5 ft 9 in (1.75 m)	Fr	The Bishop's School	La Jolla, CA
F	5	Jordan Hosey	6 ft 1 in (1.85 m)	Jr	Manvel	Pearland, TX
G	10	Lashann Higgs	5 ft 9 in (1.75 m)	Jr	Cedar Ridge	Round Rock, TX
G	11	Brooke McCarty	5 ft 4 in (1.63 m)	Sr	Clear Springs	League City, TX
G/F	12	Jada Underwood	6 ft 0 in (1.83 m)	So	Horn	Mesquite, TX
F	14	Olamide Aborowa	6 ft 3 in (1.91 m)	Jr	Neumann-Goretti	Ondo, Nigeria
G	15	Chasity Patterson	5 ft 5 in (1.65 m)	Fr	North Shore	Houston, TX
G	23	Ariel Atkins	5 ft 11 in (1.8 m)	Sr	Duncanville	Duncanville, TX
G/F	24	Joyner Holmes	6 ft 3 in (1.91 m)	So	Cedar Hill	Cedar Hill, TX
F	30	Khaléann Caron-Goudreau	6 ft 4 in (1.93 m)	RS Jr	IMG Academy; Vanderbilt	Gatineau, QE
F	31	Audrey-Ann Caron-Goudreau	6 ft 4 in (1.93 m)	Sr	IMG Academy; Gulf Coast State College	Gatineau, QE
F	33	Rellah Boothe	6 ft 3 in (1.91 m)	Fr	IMG Academy	Ocala, FL
F/C	40	Jatarie White	6 ft 4 in (1.93 m)	RS Jr	Providence Day; South Carolina	Charlotte, NC

Head coach

- Karen Aston (Little Rock)

Assistant coach(es)

- Jamie Carey (Stanford)
- George Washington (Abilene Christian)
- Tina Thompson (USC)

Legend

- (C) Team captain
- (S) Suspended
- (I) Ineligible
- (W) Walk-on
- Injured
- Current redshirt

Roster

== Schedule ==
Date time, TV	Rank^{#}	Opponent^{#}	Result	Record	Site city, state
Exhibition
11/05/2017*; 1:00 pm, LHN	No. 2	Oklahoma City	W 99–36		Frank Erwin Center (1,184); Austin, TX
Regular season
11/12/2017*; 1:00 pm, LHN	No. 2	Stetson	W 95–59	1–0	Frank Erwin Center (3,415); Austin, TX
11/15/2017*; 11:00 am, LHN	No. 2	McNeese State	W 100–34	2–0	Frank Erwin Center (7,651); Austin, TX
11/17/2017*; 7:00 pm, LHN	No. 2	UTSA	W 120–70	3–0	Frank Erwin Center (3,135); Austin, TX
11/24/2017*; 5:30 pm	No. 2	vs. LSU; South Point Thanksgiving Shootout	W 75–66	4–0	South Point Arena; Enterprise, NV
11/25/2017*; 3:15 pm	No. 2	vs. Washington; South Point Thanksgiving Shootout	W 92–68	5–0	South Point Arena; Enterprise, NV
11/30/2017*; 7:00 pm, LHN	No. 2	Louisiana Tech	W 88–54	6–0	Frank Erwin Center (2,956); Austin, TX
12/03/2017*; 3:00 pm, SECN	No. 2	at Georgia; Big 12/SEC Women's Challenge	W 81–53	7–0	Stegeman Coliseum (3,390); Athens, GA
12/10/2017*; 2:00 pm, ESPN2	No. 2	at No. 11 Tennessee	L 75–82	7–1	Thompson–Boling Arena (9,651); Knoxville, TN
12/13/2017*; 7:00 pm, LHN	No. 8	Northwestern State	W 68–44	8–1	Frank Erwin Center (3,461); Austin, TX
12/17/2017*; 11:30 am, FS1	No. 8	No. 12 Florida State	W 87–72	9–1	Frank Erwin Center (4,202); Austin, TX
12/28/2017; 7:00 pm, FCSC	No. 8	at Oklahoma	W 88–78	10–1 (1–0)	Lloyd Noble Center (3,391); Norman, OK
12/31/2017; 3:30 pm, FSN	No. 8	No. 9 West Virginia	W 79–58	11–1 (2–0)	Frank Erwin Center (3,391); Austin, TX
01/03/2018; 7:00 pm, LHN	No. 8	No. 20 Oklahoma State	W 84–79	12–1 (3–0)	Frank Erwin Center (3,240); Austin, TX
01/07/2018; 1:00 pm, ESPNU	No. 8	at Kansas State	W 75–64	13–1 (4–0)	Bramlage Coliseum (3,908); Manhattan, KS
01/10/2018; 8:00 pm, FSSW+	No. 7	at TCU	L 77–79	13–2 (4–1)	Schollmaier Arena (2,150); Fort Worth, TX
01/13/2018; 1:00 pm, LHN	No. 7	Kansas	W 79–62	14–2 (5–1)	Frank Erwin Center (4,015); Austin, TX
01/15/2018*; 6:00 pm, ESPN2	No. 9	No. 1 Connecticut	L 71–75	14–3	Frank Erwin Center (11,877); Austin, TX
01/20/2018; 3:00 pm, FSN	No. 9	at Texas Tech	W 90–49	15–3 (6–1)	United Supermarkets Arena (5,330); Lubbock, TX
01/25/2018; 6:00 pm, ESPN2	No. 6	at No. 3 Baylor	L 56–81	15–4 (6–2)	Ferrell Center (9,286); Waco, TX
01/27/2018; 7:00 pm, LHN	No. 6	Iowa State	W 87–55	16–4 (7–2)	Frank Erwin Center (4,446); Austin, TX
01/31/2018; 7:00 pm, ESPN3	No. 8	at Kansas	W 55–41	17–4 (8–2)	Allen Fieldhouse (1,625); Lawrence, KS
02/03/2018; 12:00 pm, LHN	No. 8	No. 22 TCU	W 92–65	18–4 (9–2)	Frank Erwin Center (6,023); Austin, TX
02/05/2018; 6:00 pm, FS1	No. 6	at West Virginia	W 73–55	19–4 (10–2)	WVU Coliseum (2,149); Morgantown, WV
02/10/2018; 7:00 pm, LHN	No. 6	Kansas State	W 76–54	20–4 (11–2)	Frank Erwin Center (3,900); Austin, TX
02/14/2018; 7:00 pm, LHN	No. 6	Texas Tech	W 87–72	21–4 (12–2)	Frank Erwin Center (3,082); Austin, TX
02/17/2018; 2:00 pm, FSOK	No. 6	at No. 21 Oklahoma State	W 77–62	22–4 (13–2)	Gallagher-Iba Arena (2,131); Stillwater, OK
02/19/2018; 6:00 pm, ESPN2	No. 6	No. 3 Baylor	L 87–93	22–5 (13–3)	Frank Erwin Center (6,642); Austin, TX
02/24/2018; 5:00 pm, FSN	No. 6	at Iowa State	W 72–59	23–5 (14–3)	Hilton Coliseum (10,061); Ames, IA
02/27/2018; 6:00 pm, FS1	No. 7	Oklahoma	W 79–66	24–5 (15–3)	Frank Erwin Center (4,207); Austin, TX
Big 12 Women's Tournament
03/03/2018; 6:00 pm, FSN	(2) No. 7	vs. (7) Iowa State; Quarterfinals	W 81–69	25–5	Chesapeake Energy Arena; Oklahoma City, OK
03/04/2018; 4:30 pm, FS1	(2) No. 7	vs. (6) West Virginia; Semifinals	W 68–55	26–5	Chesapeake Energy Arena (3,832); Oklahoma City, OK
03/05/2018; 8:00 pm, FS1	(2) No. 8	vs. (1) No. 2 Baylor; Championship Game	L 69–77	26–6	Chesapeake Energy Arena (3,520); Oklahoma City, OK
NCAA Women's Tournament
03/17/2018*; 5:00 pm, ESPN2	(2 KC) No. 8	(15 KC) Maine; First Round	W 83–54	27–6	Frank Erwin Center (3,878); Austin, TX
03/19/2018*; 8:00 pm, ESPN2	(2 KC) No. 8	(7 KC) Arizona State; Second Round	W 85–65	28–6	Frank Erwin Center (3,286); Austin, TX
03/23/2018*; 8:00 pm, ESPN2	(2 KC) No. 8	vs. (3 KC) No. 9 UCLA; Sweet Sixteen	L 75–84	28–7	Sprint Center (4,280); Kansas City, MO
*Non-conference game. ^{#}Rankings from AP Poll. (#) Tournament seedings in parentheses. KC=Kansas City Region. All times are in Central Time.

== Rankings ==
Regular season polls
Poll	Pre- season	Week 2	Week 3	Week 4	Week 5	Week 6	Week 7	Week 8	Week 9	Week 10	Week 11	Week 12	Week 13	Week 14	Week 15	Week 16	Week 17	Week 18	Week 19	Final
AP	2	2	2	2	2	8	8	8	8	7	9	6	8	6	6	6	7	8	8	N/A
Coaches	6	N/A	4т	4	4	8	8	8	8	7	9	6	8	6	6	6	7	8	8	10

Legend
	Increase in ranking
	Decrease in ranking
	No change
(RV)	Received votes
(NR)	Not ranked

== 2017–18 media ==
=== Television and radio information ===
Most University of Texas home games were shown on the Longhorn Network, with national telecasts on the Big 12 Conference's television partners. On the radio, women's basketball games aired on KTXX-HD4 "105.3 The Bat", with select games on KTXX-FM 104.9.

== See also ==
- 2017–18 Texas Longhorns men's basketball team
