= 2017–18 Kentucky Wildcats women's basketball team =

Intercollegiate basketball season

2017–18 Kentucky Wildcats women's basketball
- Conference: Southeastern Conference
- Record: 15–17 (6–10 SEC)
- Head coach: Matthew Mitchell (11th season)
- Associate head coach: Kyra Elzy
- Assistant coaches: Niya Butts; Lin Dunn
- Home arena: Memorial Coliseum; Rupp Arena

2017–18 SEC women's basketball standings
	Conf.				Overall
Team	W		L	PCT	W		L	PCT
No. 4 Mississippi State	16	–	0	1.000	37	–	2	.949
No. 7 South Carolina †	12	–	4	.750	29	–	7	.806
No. 18 Georgia	12	–	4	.750	26	–	7	.788
No. 12 Tennessee	11	–	5	.688	25	–	8	.758
No. 17 Missouri	11	–	5	.688	24	–	8	.750
No. 14 Texas A&M	11	–	5	.688	26	–	10	.722
No. 24 LSU	11	–	5	.688	19	–	10	.655
Alabama	7	–	9	.438	20	–	14	.588
Kentucky	6	–	10	.375	15	–	17	.469
Auburn	5	–	11	.313	14	–	15	.483
Arkansas	3	–	13	.188	13	–	18	.419
Florida	3	–	13	.188	11	–	19	.367
Vanderbilt	3	–	13	.188	7	–	24	.226
Ole Miss	1	–	15	.063	12	–	19	.387
† 2018 SEC tournament winner As of April 1, 2018; Rankings from AP poll

The 2017–18 Kentucky Wildcats women's basketball team represented the University of Kentucky in the 2017–18 NCAA Division I women's basketball season. The team played its home games in Lexington, Kentucky at Memorial Coliseum, with three games at Rupp Arena. The team was led by Matthew Mitchell in his eleventh season as head coach. They were a member of the Southeastern Conference. They finished the season 15–17, 6–10 in SEC play to finish in ninth place. They advanced to the quarterfinals of the SEC women's tournament, where they lost to Mississippi State. They missed the postseason for the first time since 2004.

== Previous season ==
The Wildcats finished the season 22–11, 11–5 in SEC play to finish in a tie for third place. They advanced to the semifinals of the SEC women's tournament, where they lost to South Carolina. They received an at-large bid to the NCAA women's tournament, where they defeated Belmont in the first round before losing to Ohio State in the second round.

== Offseason ==
=== Departures ===
Name	Number	Pos.	Height	Year	Hometown	Reason for departure
Evelyn Akhator	13	F	6'3"	Senior	Lagos, Nigeria	Graduated/declared for 2017 WNBA draft
Makayla Epps	25	G	5'10''	Senior	Lebanon, Kentucky	Graduated/declared for 2017 WNBA draft

=== Newcomers ===
College recruiting
Name	Hometown	School	Height	Weight	Commit date
Keke McKinney; F	Knoxville, TN	Fulton	6 ft 1 in (1.85 m)	N/A	
Keke McKinney; F	Recruit ratings: ESPN: (94)				
Dorie Harrison; F	Nashville, TN	Hillsboro	6 ft 3 in (1.91 m)	N/A	
Dorie Harrison; F	Recruit ratings: ESPN: (90)				
Kameron Roach; G	Hopkins, SC	Lower Richland	5 ft 6 in (1.68 m)	N/A	
Kameron Roach; G	Recruit ratings: ESPN: (90)				
Tatyanna Wyatt; F	Columbus, GA	Columbus	6 ft 1 in (1.85 m)	N/A	
Tatyanna Wyatt; F	Recruit ratings: ESPN: (89)				
Amanda Paschal; G	Brooklyn, NY	Gulf Coast State College	5 ft 7 in (1.70 m)	N/A	
Amanda Paschal; G	Recruit ratings: No ratings found				
Overall recruit ranking:
Note: In many cases, Scout, Rivals, 247Sports, On3, and ESPN may conflict in their listings of height and weight.; In these cases, the average was taken. ESPN grades are on a 100-point scale.; Sources: "2017 Player Commits". ESPN. Archived from the original on September 6, 2017.

== Roster ==
2017–18 Kentucky Wildcats women's basketball team
Players
Coaches

Pos.	#	Name	Height	Year	Previous school	Hometown
F	0	LaShae Halsel	6 ft 0 in (1.83 m)	Jr	Warren Central	Bowling Green, KY
G	2	Paige Poffenberger	5 ft 8 in (1.73 m)	So	Morgantown	Morgantown, WV
F	3	Keke McKinney	6 ft 1 in (1.85 m)	Fr	Fulton	Knoxville, TN
G	4	Maci Morris	6 ft 0 in (1.83 m)	Jr	Bell County	Pineville, KY
G	12	Amanda Paschal	5 ft 7 in (1.7 m)	Jr	Gulf Coast State College	Brooklyn, NY
F	14	Tatyana Wyatt	6 ft 2 in (1.88 m)	Fr	Columbus	Columbus, GA
G	15	Jessica Hardin	5 ft 8 in (1.73 m)	RS Sr	Wayne County; Bellarmine	Monticello, KY
C	20	Dorie Harrison	6 ft 3 in (1.91 m)	Fr	Hillsboro	Nashville, TN
F	21	Ogechi Anyagaligbo (injured)	6 ft 1 in (1.85 m)	Jr	Miami County Day; Stony Brook	Miami, FL
G	22	Makenzie Cann	6 ft 1 in (1.85 m)	Sr	Anderson County; Cincinnati	Lawrenceburg, KY
G	23	Kameron Roach	5 ft 6 in (1.68 m)	Fr	Lower Richland	Hopkins, SC
G	24	Taylor Murray	5 ft 6 in (1.68 m)	Jr	Annapolis Area Christian	Odenton, MD
G	32	Jaida Roper	5 ft 6 in (1.68 m)	So	Houston	Memphis, TN
C	45	Alyssa Rice	6 ft 3 in (1.91 m)	Sr	Reynoldsburg	Reynoldsburg, OH

Head coach

- Matthew Mitchell (Mississippi State)

Assistant coach(es)

- Kyra Elzy (Tennessee)
- Niya Butts (Tennessee)
- Lin Dunn (UT Martin)

Legend

- (C) Team captain
- (S) Suspended
- (I) Ineligible
- (W) Walk-on
- Injured
- Current redshirt

Roster
Last update: September 6, 2017

== Schedule ==
Date time, TV	Rank^{#}	Opponent^{#}	Result	Record	Site (attendance) city, state
Exhibition
11/05/2017*; 7:00 pm		Southern Indiana	W 87–56		Memorial Coliseum (1,089); Lexington, KY
Non-conference regular season
11/10/2017*; 7:00 pm		Sacramento State; Matthew Mitchell Classic	W 101–70	1–0	Memorial Coliseum (4,313); Lexington, KY
11/12/2017*; 2:00 pm		Gardner–Webb; Matthew Mitchell Classic	W 72–34	2–0	Memorial Coliseum (4,256); Lexington, KY
11/16/2017*; 9:00 pm	No. 25	at Montana	W 71–54	3–0	Dahlberg Arena (2,808); Missoula, MT
11/19/2017*; 4:00 pm, P12N	No. 25	at Washington State	W 73–68	4–0	Beasley Coliseum (991); Pullman, WA
11/22/2017*; 2:00 pm	No. 22	Morehead State; Matthew Mitchell Classic	W 86–53	5–0	Memorial Coliseum (4,710); Lexington, KY
11/26/2017*; 2:00 pm	No. 22	Marshall	W 69–39	6–0	Memorial Coliseum (4,276); Lexington, KY
11/30/2017*; 8:00 pm, FCS	No. 20	at No. 9 Baylor; Big 12/SEC Women's Challenge	L 63–90	6–1	Ferrell Center (5,356); Waco, TX
12/03/2017*; 2:00 pm	No. 20	Tennessee Tech	W 82–54	7–1	Memorial Coliseum (4,561); Lexington, KY
12/05/2017*; 7:00 pm	No. 20	Evansville	W 100–62	8–1	Memorial Coliseum (4,071); Lexington, KY
12/08/2017*; 7:00 pm	No. 20	at Florida Gulf Coast	L 64–70	8–2	Alico Arena (2,343); Fort Myers, FL
12/10/2017*; 1:00 pm	No. 20	at Miami (FL)	L 54–65	8–3	Watsco Center (868); Coral Gables, FL
12/17/2017*; 3:00 pm, SECN		No. 3 Louisville; The Battle for the Bluegrass	L 63–87	8–4	Memorial Coliseum (5,871); Lexington, KY
12/21/2017*; Noon, SECN		No. 24 California	L 52–62	8–5	Memorial Coliseum (4,753); Lexington, KY
12/28/2017*; 7:30 pm		at Middle Tennessee	L 57–62	8–6	Murphy Center (4,209); Murfreesboro, TN
SEC regular season
12/31/2017; Noon, SECN		No. 7 Tennessee; Rivalry	L 49–63	8–7 (0–1)	Rupp Arena (8,921); Lexington, KY
01/04/2018; 7:00 pm, SECN		at No. 22 Texas A&M	L 70–74	8–8 (0–2)	Reed Arena (3,662); College Station, TX
01/07/2018; 2:00 pm		Georgia	L 42–56	8–9 (0–3)	Memorial Coliseum (5,782); Lexington, KY
01/11/2018; 7:00 pm		at Florida	W 56–53	9–9 (1–3)	O'Connell Center (1,509); Gainesville, FL
01/15/2018; 7:00 pm, SECN		at Vanderbilt	L 55–70	9–10 (1–4)	Memorial Gymnasium (2,215); Nashville, TN
01/21/2018; Noon, ESPNU		No. 10 South Carolina	L 64–81	9–11 (1–5)	Rupp Arena (6,521); Lexington, KY
01/25/2018; 7:00 pm		Alabama	W 79–54	10–11 (2–5)	Memorial Coliseum (4,957); Lexington, KY
01/29/2018; 7:00 pm, SECN		at Arkansas	W 76–65	11–11 (3–5)	Bud Walton Arena (1,313); Fayetteville, AR
02/01/2018; 7:00 pm		Auburn	W 65–48	12–11 (4–5)	Memorial Coliseum (4,151); Lexington, KY
02/04/2018; Noon, SECN		LSU	L 70–72	12–12 (4–6)	Rupp Arena (4,521); Lexington, KY
02/08/2018; 9:00 pm, SECN		at No. 15 Missouri	L 78–83	12–13 (4–7)	Mizzou Arena (3,430); Columbia, MO
02/11/2018; 2:00 pm, ESPNU		at No. 2 Mississippi State	L 55–74	12–14 (4–8)	Humphrey Coliseum (9,520); Starkville, MS
02/15/2018; 7:00 pm		Arkansas	W 78–57	13–14 (5–8)	Memorial Coliseum (5,306); Lexington, KY
02/18/2018; 3:00 pm, SECN		at No. 8 South Carolina	L 63–81	13–15 (5–9)	Colonial Life Arena (14,895); Columbia, SC
02/22/2018; 8:30 pm, SECN		at Ole Miss	W 79–71	14–15 (6–9)	The Pavilion at Ole Miss (1,141); Oxford, MS
02/25/2018; Noon, ESPNU		No. 2 Mississippi State	L 63–85	14–16 (6–10)	Memorial Coliseum (6,014); Lexington, KY
SEC Women's Tournament
03/01/2018; 1:00 pm, SECN	(9)	vs. (8) Alabama; Second Round	W 71–64	15–16	Bridgestone Arena; Nashville, TN
03/02/2018; 1:00 pm, SECN	(9)	vs. (1) No. 2 Mississippi State; Quarterfinals	L 58–81	15–17	Bridgestone Arena; Nashville, TN
*Non-conference game. ^{#}Rankings from AP Poll. (#) Tournament seedings in parentheses. All times are in Eastern Time.

== Rankings ==
Ranking movements Legend: ██ Increase in ranking ██ Decrease in ranking — = Not ranked RV = Received votes
	Week																				
Poll	Pre	1	2	3	4	5	6	7	8	9	10	11	12	13	14	15	16	17	18	19	Final
AP	RV	25	22	22	20	20	RV	RV	—	—	—	—	—								Not released
Coaches	RV	RV^	RV	22	23	RV	RV	—	—	—	—	—									

^Coaches' Poll did not release a second poll at the same time as the AP.

== See also ==
- 2017–18 Kentucky Wildcats men's basketball team
