= 2017–18 TCU Horned Frogs women's basketball team =

Intercollegiate basketball season

2017–18 TCU Horned Frogs women's basketball

WNIT, Semifinals
- Conference: Big 12 Conference
- Record: 23–13 (9–9 Big 12)
- Head coach: Raegan Pebley (4th season)
- Assistant coaches: Hanna Howard; Britney Brown; Aaron Kallhoff
- Home arena: Schollmaier Arena

2017–18 Big 12 Conference women's basketball standings
	Conf.				Overall
Team	W		L	PCT	W		L	PCT
No. 2 Baylor †	18	–	0	1.000	33	–	2	.943
No. 8 Texas	15	–	3	.833	28	–	7	.800
Oklahoma State	11	–	7	.611	21	–	11	.656
Oklahoma	11	–	7	.611	16	–	15	.516
TCU	9	–	9	.500	23	–	13	.639
West Virginia	8	–	10	.444	25	–	12	.676
Iowa State	7	–	11	.389	14	–	17	.452
Kansas State	7	–	11	.389	18	–	16	.529
Kansas	3	–	15	.167	12	–	18	.400
Texas Tech	1	–	17	.056	7	–	23	.233
† 2018 Big 12 Tournament winner Rankings from AP poll

The 2017–18 TCU Horned Frogs women's basketball team represented Texas Christian University in the 2017–18 NCAA Division I women's basketball season. The 2017–18 season was head coach Raegan Pebley's fourth season at TCU. The Horned Frogs were members of the Big 12 Conference and played their home games in Schollmaier Arena. This season TCU got back in the AP Top 25 for the first time since 2010. They finished the season 23–13, 9–9 in Big 12 play to finish in fifth place. They advanced to the semifinals of the Big 12 women's tournament where they lost to Baylor. They received an at-large bid to the Women's National Invitation Tournament where they defeated Lamar, Missouri State and New Mexico in the first, second and third rounds, and then South Dakota in the quarterfinals before losing to Indiana in the semifinals.

== Roster ==
2017–18 TCU Horned Frogs women's basketball team
Players
Coaches

Pos.	#	Name	Height	Year	Previous school	Hometown
F	00	Amy Okonkwo	6 ft 2 in (1.88 m)	RS Jr	Etiwanda; USC	Fontana, CA
G	1	Toree Thompson	5 ft 10 in (1.78 m)	Sr	Broken Arrow; Ole Miss	Broken Arrow, OK
G	3	Mikayla Christian	5 ft 9 in (1.75 m)	So	Vista Ridge	Round Rock, TX
G	4	Amber Ramirez	5 ft 8 in (1.73 m)	So	Wagner	San Antonio, TX
G	15	Jayde Woods	6 ft 1 in (1.85 m)	So	Windward School; Oregon	Yorba Linda, CA
G	20	Lauren Heard	5 ft 9 in (1.75 m)	Fr	Guyer	Denton, TX
F	21	Sydney Coleman	6 ft 1 in (1.85 m)	Sr	Cypress Ranch	Cypress, TX
C	22	Jordan Moore	6 ft 3 in (1.91 m)	Jr	Stony Point	Round Rock, TX
G	24	Dakota Vann	6 ft 0 in (1.83 m)	Jr	Deer Creek; Butler CC	Oklahoma City, OK
G	25	Kianna Ray	6 ft 1 in (1.85 m)	So	Bowie	Austin, TX
F	31	Ella Hellessey	6 ft 2 in (1.88 m)	So	Padua College	Dromana, Australia
F	33	Adeola Akomolafe	6 ft 3 in (1.91 m)	RS So	El Dorado	El Paso, TX

Head coach

- Raegan Pebley (Colorado)

Assistant coach(es)

- Hanna Howard (Portland)
- Britney Brown (Oklahoma)
- Aaron Kallhoff (Bemidji State)

Legend

- (C) Team captain
- (S) Suspended
- (I) Ineligible
- (W) Walk-on
- Injured
- Current redshirt

Roster

== Schedule and results ==
Date time, TV	Rank^{#}	Opponent^{#}	Result	Record	Site (attendance) city, state
Exhibition
11/02/2017*; 6:30 pm		Texas Wesleyan	W 78–50		Schollmaier Arena; Fort Worth, TX
Non-Conference Games
11/11/2017*; 2:00 pm		Oral Roberts	W 72–58	1–0	Schollmaier Arena (1,603); Fort Worth, TX
11/14/2017*; 7:00 pm		at SMU	W 64–58	2–0	Moody Coliseum (938); Dallas, TX
11/18/2017*; 2:00 pm		Texas State	W 82–58	3–0	Schollmaier Arena (1,766); Fort Worth, TX
11/21/2017*; 6:30 pm, FSSW+		Yale	L 72–82	3–1	Schollmaier Arena (1,796); Fort Worth, TX
11/24/2017*; 7:00 pm		vs. Arizona; Warner Center Marriott Thanksgiving Basketball Classic	W 68–59	4–1	Matadome (200); Northridge, CA
11/25/2017*; 9:30 pm		vs. Idaho; Warner Center Marriott Thanksgiving Basketball Classic	W 86–76	5–1	Matadome (411); Northridge, CA
12/01/2017*; 12:00 pm, FSSW		Alabama; Big 12/SEC Women's Challenge	W 88–67	6–1	Schollmaier Arena (3,457); Fort Worth, TX
12/06/2017*; 11:00 am, SECN		at No. 21 Texas A&M; Maggie Dixon Classic	L 58–71	6–2	Reed Arena (7,480); College Station, TX
12/10/2017*; 2:00 pm, FSSW		Southeastern Louisiana	W 112–62	7–2	Schollmaier Arena (2,005); Fort Worth, TX
12/17/2017*; 2:00 pm		Northwestern State	W 89–51	8–2	Schollmaier Arena (1,920); Fort Worth, TX
12/20/2017*; 6:30 pm		Hampton	W 90–68	9–2	Schollmaier Arena (1,496); Fort Worth, TX
Conference Games
12/28/2017; 6:00 pm		No. 9 West Virginia	L 82–87	9–3 (0–1)	Schollmaier Arena (1,799); Fort Worth, TX
12/31/2017; 2:00 pm, ESPN3		at Kansas	L 77–86	9–4 (0–2)	Allen Fieldhouse (1,804); Lawrence, KS
01/04/2018; 7:00 pm, FSOK		at Oklahoma	L 71–84	9–5 (0–3)	Lloyd Noble Center (2,522); Norman, OK
01/07/2018; 2:00 pm, FSN		Texas Tech	W 93–72	10–5 (1–3)	Schollmaier Arena (1,929); Fort Worth, TX
01/10/2018; 8:00 pm, FSSW+		No. 7 Texas	W 79–77	11–5 (2–3)	Schollmaier Arena (2,150); Fort Worth, TX
01/13/2018; 4:00 pm, FSN		at No. 15 West Virginia	W 76–74 ^{OT}	12–5 (3–3)	WVU Coliseum (3,139); Morgantown, WV
01/20/2018; 2:00 pm		Kansas	W 76–66	13–5 (4–3)	Schollmaier Arena (2,327); Fort Worth, TX
01/24/2018; 7:00 pm	No. 24	at Kansas State	W 68–63	14–5 (5–3)	Bramlage Coliseum (3,381); Manhattan, KS
01/27/2018; 2:00 pm, FSSW	No. 24	Oklahoma	W 62–58	15–5 (6–3)	Schollmaier Arena (2,882); Fort Worth, TX
01/30/2018; 6:30 pm	No. 22	at Iowa State	W 75–52	16–5 (7–3)	Hilton Coliseum (9,829); Ames, IA
02/03/2018; 12:00 pm, LHN	No. 22	at No. 8 Texas	L 65–92	16–6 (7–4)	Frank Erwin Center (6,023); Austin, TX
02/07/2018; 6:30 pm, FSSW	No. 24	No. 22 Oklahoma State	L 54–71	16–7 (7–5)	Schollmaier Arena (3,125); Fort Worth, TX
02/10/2018; 7:00 pm, FSSW+	No. 24	at No. 3 Baylor	L 63–83	16–8 (7–6)	Ferrell Center (6,524); Waco, TX
02/14/2018; 6:30 pm, FSSW		Iowa State	L 63–66	16–9 (7–7)	Schollmaier Arena (1,695); Fort Worth, TX
02/17/2018; 2:00 pm, FSSW		Kansas State	W 87–70	17–9 (8–7)	Schollmaier Arena (2,043); Fort Worth, TX
02/21/2018; 6:30 pm, FSSW		at Texas Tech	W 72–60	18–9 (9–7)	United Supermarkets Arena (3,976); Lubbock, TX
02/24/2018; 5:00 pm		No. 3 Baylor	L 53–85	18–10 (9–8)	Schollmaier Arena (3,186); Fort Worth, TX
02/26/2018; 8:00 pm, FSSW+		at Oklahoma State	L 72–85	18–11 (9–9)	Gallagher-Iba Arena (1,563); Stillwater, OK
Big 12 Women's Tournament
03/03/2018; 11:00 am, FSN	(5)	vs. (4) Oklahoma; Quarterfinals	W 90–83	19–11	Chesapeake Energy Arena; Oklahoma City, OK
03/04/2018; 2:00 pm, FS1	(5)	vs. (1) No. 3 Baylor; Semifinals	L 48–94	19–12	Chesapeake Energy Arena; Oklahoma City, OK
WNIT
03/15/2018*; 6:30 pm		Lamar; First Round	W 80–68	20–12	Schollmaier Arena (1,330); Fort Worth, TX
03/17/2018*; 12:00 pm		Missouri State; Second Round	W 86–51	21–12	Schollmaier Arena (1,069); Fort Worth, TX
03/22/2018*; 8:00 pm		at New Mexico; Third Round	W 81–72	22–12	Dreamstyle Arena (3,938); Albuquerque, NM
03/25/2018*; 6:00 pm		at South Dakota; Quarterfinals	W 79–71	23–12	Sanford Coyote Sports Center (3,885); Vermillion, SD
03/28/2018*; 6:00 pm		at Indiana; Semifinals	L 58–71	23–13	Simon Skjodt Assembly Hall (7,815); Bloomington, IN
*Non-conference game. ^{#}Rankings from AP Poll / Coaches' Poll. (#) Tournament seedings in parentheses. All times are in Central Time.

Schedule and results from GoFrogs.com and ESPN.com

== Rankings ==
Regular season polls
Poll	Pre- Season	Week 2	Week 3	Week 4	Week 5	Week 6	Week 7	Week 8	Week 9	Week 10	Week 11	Week 12	Week 13	Week 14	Week 15	Week 16	Week 17	Week 18	Week 19	Final
AP	NR	NR	NR	NR	NR	NR	NR	NR	NR	NR	RV	24	22	24	RV	NR	NR	NR	NR	N/A
Coaches	NR	N/A	NR	NR	NR	NR	NR	NR	NR	NR	RV	24	22	24	RV	NR	NR	NR	NR	NR

Legend
	Increase in ranking
	Decrease in ranking
	Not ranked previous week
(RV)	Received Votes

== See also ==
- 2017–18 TCU Horned Frogs men's basketball team
