= 2017–18 Oklahoma Sooners women's basketball team =

Intercollegiate basketball season

2017–18 Oklahoma Sooners women's basketball

NCAA Women's Tournament, first round
- Conference: Big 12
- Record: 16–15 (11–7 Big 12)
- Head coach: Sherri Coale (22nd season)
- Assistant coaches: Jan Ross; Pam DeCosta; Chad Thrailkill
- Home arena: Lloyd Noble Center

2017–18 Big 12 Conference women's basketball standings
	Conf.				Overall
Team	W		L	PCT	W		L	PCT
No. 2 Baylor †	18	–	0	1.000	33	–	2	.943
No. 8 Texas	15	–	3	.833	28	–	7	.800
Oklahoma State	11	–	7	.611	21	–	11	.656
Oklahoma	11	–	7	.611	16	–	15	.516
TCU	9	–	9	.500	23	–	13	.639
West Virginia	8	–	10	.444	25	–	12	.676
Iowa State	7	–	11	.389	14	–	17	.452
Kansas State	7	–	11	.389	18	–	16	.529
Kansas	3	–	15	.167	12	–	18	.400
Texas Tech	1	–	17	.056	7	–	23	.233
† 2018 Big 12 Tournament winner Rankings from AP poll

The 2017–18 Oklahoma Sooners women's basketball team represented the University of Oklahoma in the 2017–18 NCAA Division I women's basketball season. The Sooners were led by Sherri Coale in her twenty-second season. The team played its home games at the Lloyd Noble Center in Norman, Oklahoma as a member of the Big 12 Conference. They finished the season 16–15, 11–7 in Big 12 play to finish in a tie for third place. They lost in the quarterfinals of the Big 12 women's tournament to TCU. They received an at-large bid to the NCAA women's tournament, where they lost to DePaul in the first round.

== Roster ==
2017–18 Oklahoma Sooners women's basketball team
Players
Coaches

Pos.	#	Name	Height	Year	Previous school	Hometown
C	0	Vionise Pierre-Louise	6 ft 4 in (1.93 m)	Sr	Grandview Prep	Lake Worth, FL
G	1	LaNesia Williams	5 ft 7 in (1.7 m)	Sr	Northeast Academy	Oklahoma City, OK
F	3	Mandy Simpson	6 ft 0 in (1.83 m)	Fr	Boise	Boise, ID
G	11	Morgan Rich	5 ft 10 in (1.78 m)	RS So	Allen County Scottsville; Kentucky	Scottsville, KY
G	12	Gileysa Penzo	5 ft 9 in (1.75 m)	RS Jr	Montverde Academy	Guaynabo, Puerto Rico
G	14	Shaina Pellington	5 ft 7 in (1.7 m)	Fr	Dunbarton	Pickering, ON
G	21	Gabbi Ortiz	5 ft 9 in (1.75 m)	Sr	The Prairie School	Racine, WI
G	22	Ana Llanusa	6 ft 0 in (1.83 m)	Fr	Choctaw	Choctaw, OK
G	23	Maddie Manning	6 ft 2 in (1.88 m)	GS	Ankeny	Ankeny, IA
F	24	Ijeoma Odimgbe	6 ft 4 in (1.93 m)	Jr	Johnson	Savannah, GA
C	30	McKeena Treece	6 ft 4 in (1.93 m)	Sr	Incarnate Word Academy	St. Peters, MO

Head coach

- Sherri Coale (Oklahoma Christian)

Assistant coach(es)

- Jan Ross (Oklahoma Christian)
- Pam DeCosta (Metro State)
- Chad Thrailkill (Southern Nazarene)

Legend

- (C) Team captain
- (S) Suspended
- (I) Ineligible
- (W) Walk-on
- Injured
- Current redshirt

Roster
Last update: December 18, 2017

== Schedule ==
Date time, TV	Rank^{#}	Opponent^{#}	Result	Record	High points	High rebounds	High assists	Site (attendance) city, state
Exhibition
11/03/2017*; 7:00 pm	No. 22	Central Oklahoma	W 86–64		18 – Ortiz	17 – Simpson	6 – Pellington	Lloyd Noble Center (2,627); Norman, OK
11/07/2017*; 6:30 pm, FSOK	No. 22	Southwestern Oklahoma State	W 109–65		20 – Manning	11 – Pierre-Louis	5 – Pellington	Lloyd Noble Center (2,695); Norman, OK
Non-conference regular season
11/10/2017*; 7:00 pm	No. 22	Belmont	W 96–73	1–0	24 – Pierre-Louis	12 – Pierre-Louis	3 – 2 tied	Lloyd Noble Center (3,306); Norman, OK
11/13/2017*; 7:00 pm	No. 21	at DePaul	L 108–111 ^{OT}	1–1	25 – Pierre-Louis	16 – Pierre-Louis	4 – Manning	McGrath-Phillips Arena (2,072); Chicago, IL
11/17/2017*; 7:00 pm, FSOK+/FCSA	No. 21	SMU	W 87–75	2–1	20 – Ortiz	8 – 2 tied	5 – Manning	Lloyd Noble Center (2,518); Norman, OK
11/21/2017*; 8:00 pm		at Colorado State	W 78–46	3–1	18 – Ortiz	7 – 2 tied	4 – Pierre-Louis	Moby Arena (1,409); Fort Collins, CO
11/25/2017*; 4:30 pm, P12N		at No. 10 Oregon; PK80 Invitational	L 74–92	3–2	32 – Pierre-Louis	13 – Pierre-Louis	3 – Pellington	Matthew Knight Arena (6,033); Eugene, OR
11/28/2017*; 6:30 pm		at Little Rock	L 56–68	3–3	15 – 2 tied	7 – 2 tied	2 – 2 tied	Jack Stephens Center (1,306); Little Rock, AR
12/03/2017*; 2:00 pm, FSOK		Florida; Big 12/SEC Women's Challenge	L 61–80	3–4	22 – Pellington	6 – Manning	2 – 2 tied	Lloyd Noble Center (2,992); Norman, OK
12/06/2017*; 7:00 pm, ESPN3		at South Dakota State	L 61–67	3–5	16 – Pellington	9 – Simpson	4 – Penzo	Frost Arena (2,068); Brookings, SD
12/09/2017*; 2:00 pm, FSOK		No. 16 South Florida	W 79–74	4–5	31 – Ortiz	9 – Llanusa	6 – Manning	Lloyd Noble Center (3,896); Norman, OK
12/16/2017*; 2:00 pm, FSOK		New Mexico	W 105–63	5–5	25 – Ortiz	13 – Pierre-Louis	11 – Penzo	Lloyd Noble Center (4,508); Norman, OK
12/19/2017*; 5:00 pm, CBSSN		vs. No. 1 Connecticut; Hall of Fame Holiday Showcase	L 64–88	5–6	15 – Manning	6 – Pierre-Louis	2 – 5 tied	Mohegan Sun Arena (9,151); Uncasville, CT
Big 12 regular season
12/28/2017; 7:00 pm, FSOK		No. 8 Texas	L 78–88	5–7 (0–1)	16 – Pellington	5 – 2 tied	3 – Pierre-Louis	Lloyd Noble Center (3,391); Norman, OK
12/31/2017; 2:00 pm		at Iowa State	W 74–69	6–7 (1–1)	23 – Pellington	5 – 2-tied	4 – Pierre-Louis	Hilton Coliseum (9,791); Ames, IA
01/04/2018; 7:00 pm, FSOK		TCU	W 84–71	7–7 (2–1)	22 – Manning	12 – Pierre-Louis	4 – Pierre-Louis	Lloyd Noble Center (2,522); Norman, OK
01/07/2018; 4:00 pm, FSOK		at No. 20 Oklahoma State; Bedlam Series	L 82–96	7–8 (2–2)	25 – Manning	8 – Manning	4 – 2 tied	Gallagher-Iba Arena (3,128); Stillwater, OK
01/10/2018; 6:00 pm, FSSW+		at Texas Tech	W 73–52	8–8 (3–2)	22 – Pierre-Louis	10 – Manning	5 – Ortiz	United Supermarkets Arena (4,352); Lubbock, TX
01/14/2018; 1:00 pm, FS1		No. 5 Baylor	L 54–74	8–9 (3–3)	19 – Llanusa	6 – Ortiz	2 – Ortiz	Lloyd Noble Center (3,510); Norman, OK
01/17/2018; 7:00 pm		at Kansas State	W 76–71	9–9 (4–3)	20 – Ortiz	7 – 2 tied	6 – 2 tied	Bramlage Coliseum (3,465); Manhattan, KS
01/20/2018; 12:00 pm, FSN		No. 24 Oklahoma State; Bedlam Series	L 67–70	9–10 (4–4)	26 – Pellington	20 – Pierre-Louis	3 – Pierre-Louis	Lloyd Noble Center (4,529); Norman, OK
01/24/2018; 6:00 pm, FSOK		Kansas	W 97–64	10–10 (5–4)	18 – Llanusa	7 – Llanusa	3 – 2 tied	Lloyd Noble Center (3,302); Norman, OK
01/27/2018; 2:00 pm, FSSW		at No. 24 TCU	L 58–62	10–11 (5–5)	19 – Pellington	14 – Pierre-Louis	4 – Penzo	Schollmaier Arena (2,882); Fort Worth, TX
01/31/2018; 10:30 am, FSOK		Kansas State	W 68–49	11–11 (6–5)	26 – Pierre-Louis	13 – Pierre-Louis	5 – 3 tied	Lloyd Noble Center (7,245); Norman, OK
02/03/2018; 2:00 pm, FSOK		No. 21 West Virginia	W 76–57	12–11 (7–5)	27 – Llanusa	6 – 3 tied	4 – Ortiz	Lloyd Noble Center (3,490); Norman, OK
02/05/2018; 8:00 pm, FS1		at No. 3 Baylor	L 65–74	12–12 (7–6)	19 – Pierre-Louis	6 – Manning	5 – Pellington	Ferrell Center (5,324); Waco, TX
02/10/2018; 7:00 pm, JTV/ESPN3		at Kansas	W 72–52	13–12 (8–6)	16 – Oritz	9 – Pierre-Louis	5 – Ortiz	Allen Fieldhouse (4,117); Lawrence, KS
02/17/2018; 2:00 pm, ATTPT		at West Virginia	W 79–77 ^{OT}	14–12 (9–6)	22 – Pellington	11 – Pierre-Louis	4 – Ortiz	WVU Coliseum (4,326); Morgantown, WV
02/21/2018; 7:00 pm, FSSW+		Iowa State	W 80–71	15–12 (10–6)	23 – Pierre-Louis	11 – Pierre-Louis	5 – Ortiz	Lloyd Noble Center; Norman, OK
02/24/2018; 12:00 pm, FSOK		Texas Tech	W 79–61	16–12 (11–6)	19 – Pierre-Louis	12 – Pierre-Louis	4 – Ortiz	Lloyd Noble Center (5,030); Norman, OK
02/27/2018; 6:00 pm, LHN		at No. 7 Texas	L 66–79	16–13 (11–7)	19 – Pierre-Louis	7 – Pierre-Louis	2 – 4 tied	Frank Erwin Center (4,207); Austin, TX
Big 12 Women's Tournament
03/03/2018; 11:00 am, FSN	(4)	vs. (5) TCU; Quarterfinals	L 83–90	16–14	24 – Manning	10 – Pierre-Louis	2 – Pellington	Chesapeake Energy Arena; Oklahoma City, OK
NCAA Women's Tournament
03/16/2018*; 11:00 am, ESPN2	(12 S)	vs. (5 S) DePaul; First Round	L 79–90	16–15	21 – Pierre-Louis	8 – Manning	10 – Penzo	Reed Arena; College Station, TX
*Non-conference game. ^{#}Rankings from AP Poll. (#) Tournament seedings in parentheses. S=Spokane Region. All times are in Central Time.

x- Sooner Sports Television (SSTV) is aired locally on Fox Sports. However, the contract allows games to air on various affiliates. Those affiliates are FSSW, FSSW+, FSOK, FSOK+, and FCS Atlantic, Central, and Pacific.

== Rankings ==
Regular season polls
Poll	Pre- season	Week 2	Week 3	Week 4	Week 5	Week 6	Week 7	Week 8	Week 9	Week 10	Week 11	Week 12	Week 13	Week 14	Week 15	Week 16	Week 17	Week 18	Week 19	Final
AP	22	21	RV	RV	RV	RV	RV	RV	NR	NR	NR	NR	NR	NR	NR	RV	RV	NR	NR	N/A
Coaches	21	N/A	RV	RV	NR	RV	RV	RV	NR	NR	NR	NR	NR	NR	NR	RV	NR	NR	NR	NR

Legend
	Increase in ranking
	Decrease in ranking
	No change
(RV)	Received votes
(NR)	Not ranked

== See also ==
- 2017–18 Oklahoma Sooners men's basketball team
