= 2017–18 Kansas State Wildcats women's basketball team =

Intercollegiate basketball season

2017–18 Kansas State Wildcats women's basketball

WNIT, Third Round
- Conference: Big 12 Conference
- Record: 18–16 (7–11 Big 12)
- Head coach: Jeff Mittie (4th season)
- Assistant coaches: Brian Ostermann; Chris Carr; Jayci Stone
- Home arena: Bramlage Coliseum

2017–18 Big 12 Conference women's basketball standings
	Conf.				Overall
Team	W		L	PCT	W		L	PCT
No. 2 Baylor †	18	–	0	1.000	33	–	2	.943
No. 8 Texas	15	–	3	.833	28	–	7	.800
Oklahoma State	11	–	7	.611	21	–	11	.656
Oklahoma	11	–	7	.611	16	–	15	.516
TCU	9	–	9	.500	23	–	13	.639
West Virginia	8	–	10	.444	25	–	12	.676
Iowa State	7	–	11	.389	14	–	17	.452
Kansas State	7	–	11	.389	18	–	16	.529
Kansas	3	–	15	.167	12	–	18	.400
Texas Tech	1	–	17	.056	7	–	23	.233
† 2018 Big 12 Tournament winner Rankings from AP poll

The 2017–18 Kansas State Wildcats women's basketball team represented Kansas State University in the 2017–18 NCAA Division I women's basketball season. The Wildcats were led by fourth-year head coach Jeff Mittie, and played their home games at Bramlage Coliseum in Manhattan, Kansas as members of the Big 12 Conference. They finished the season 18–16, 7–11 in Big 12 play to finish in a tie for seventh place. They advanced to the quarterfinals of the Big 12 women's tournament, where they lost to Baylor. They received an at-large bid to the Women's National Invitation Tournament, where they defeated Saint Louis and Utah in the first and second rounds before losing to UC Davis in the third round.

== Previous season ==
They finished the season 23–11, 11–7 in Big 12 play to finish in fourth place. They advanced to the semifinals of the Big 12 women's tournament where they lost to Baylor. They received an at-large bid to the NCAA women's tournament where they defeated Drake in the first round before losing to Stanford in the second round.

== Roster ==
2017–18 Kansas State Wildcats women's basketball team
Players
Coaches

Pos.	#	Name	Height	Year	Previous school	Hometown
C	0	Anastasia Tsybaeva	6 ft 7 in (2.01 m)	Jr	Burbank; East Los Angeles	Burbank, CA
G	1	Kaylee Page	6 ft 2 in (1.88 m)	Sr	Wamego; Nebraska	Wamego, KS
G	2	Cymone Goodrich	5 ft 10 in (1.78 m)	Fr	South Shore International Prep	Chicago, IL
G	5	Alisa Wiggins	5 ft 8 in (1.73 m)	Fr	Montclair	Montclair, NJ
G	10	Kayla Goth	6 ft 1 in (1.85 m)	Jr	DeForest	DeForest, WI
F	11	Peyton Williams	6 ft 3 in (1.91 m)	So	Cair Paravel	Topeka, KS
G	12	Rachel Ranke	6 ft 1 in (1.85 m)	Fr	Eastview	Burnsville, MN
F	15	Kali Jones	6 ft 2 in (1.88 m)	Jr	Murrietta; Mt. San Antonio	Murrieta, CA
G	22	Karyla Middlebrook	5 ft 7 in (1.7 m)	RS Sr	Blue Springs HS; Alabama	Blue Springs, MO
C	33	Ashley Ray	6 ft 4 in (1.93 m)	Fr	Girard	Girard, KS
C	40	Mary Lakes	6 ft 4 in (1.93 m)	Fr	Manual	Peoria, IL
G	50	Shaelyn Martin	6 ft 0 in (1.83 m)	Sr	Salinas Central	Salina, KS

Head coach

- Jeff Mittie (Missouri Western)

Assistant coach(es)

- Brian Ostermann (UW–La Crosse)
- Chris Carr (Southern Illinois)
- Jayci Stone (Kansas State)

Legend

- (C) Team captain
- (S) Suspended
- (I) Ineligible
- (W) Walk-on
- Injured
- Current redshirt

Roster
Last update: February 3, 2018

== Schedule and results ==
Date time, TV	Rank^{#}	Opponent^{#}	Result	Record	Site (attendance) city, state
Exhibition
11/03/2017*; 5:30 pm		Emporia State	W 87–65		Bramlage Coliseum (3,470); Manhattan, KS
11/06/2017*; 7:00 pm, Cox Kansas		Fort Hays State	W 61–46		Bramlage Coliseum (3,009); Manhattan, KS
Non-conference regular season
11/10/2017*; 5:30 pm		Stephen F. Austin	W 74–49	1–0	Bramlage Coliseum (3,838); Manhattan, KS
11/13/2017*; 7:00 pm, Cox Kansas		Omaha	W 81–60	2–0	Bramlage Coliseum (2,990); Manhattan, KS
11/17/2017*; 5:30 pm		Florida A&M	W 81–57	3–0	Bramlage Coliseum (3,439); Manhattan, KS
11/19/2017*; 3:00 pm		at North Texas	W 55–54	4–0	The Super Pit (1,172); Denton, TX
11/24/2017*; 3:15 pm		vs. No. 5 UCLA; South Point Thanksgiving Shootout	L 55–64	4–1	South Point Arena (550); Las Vegas, NV
11/25/2017*; 7:45 pm		vs. Penn State; South Point Thanksgiving Shootout	W 70–65	5–1	South Point Arena (650); Las Vegas, NV
11/30/2017*; 7:00 pm, SECN		at No. 19 Missouri; Big 12/SEC Women's Challenge	L 59–73	5–2	Mizzou Arena (3,068); Columbia, MO
12/06/2017*; 7:00 pm, ESPN3		Texas–Arlington	W 70–56	6–2	Bramlage Coliseum (2,974); Manhattan, KS
12/16/2017*; 2:00 pm, ESPN3		Little Rock	W 66–51	7–2	Bramlage Coliseum (3,254); Manhattan, KS
12/18/2017*; 7:00 pm, ESPN3		Chicago State	W 99–51	8–2	Bramlage Coliseum (2,927); Manhattan, KS
12/21/2017*; 7:00 pm, ESPN3		Northern Iowa	L 71–72	8–3	Bramlage Coliseum (3,260); Manhattan, KS
Big 12 regular season
12/28/2017; 7:00 pm, Cox Kansas		No. 6 Baylor	L 58–88	8–4 (0–1)	Bramlage Coliseum (3,396); Manhattan, KS
12/31/2017; 2:00 pm		at No. 24 Oklahoma State	L 68–76	8–5 (0–2)	Gallagher-Iba Arena (2,277); Stillwater, OK
01/03/2018; 6:00 pm, Nexstar		at No. 12 West Virginia	W 60–52	9–5 (1–2)	WVU Coliseum (1,440); Morgantown, WV
01/07/2018; 1:00 pm, ESPNU		No. 8 Texas	L 54–75	9–6 (1–3)	Bramlage Coliseum (1,440); Manhattan, KS
01/10/2018; 6:30 pm, Cyclones.tv		at Iowa State	W 67–60	10–6 (2–3)	Hilton Coliseum (9,501); Ames, IA
01/13/2018; 1:00 pm, FSN		No. 20 Oklahoma State	W 80–64	11–7 (3–3)	Bramlage Coliseum (4,041); Manhattan, KS
01/17/2018; 7:00 pm, ESPN3		Oklahoma	L 71–76	11–8 (3–4)	Bramlage Coliseum (3,465); Manhattan, KS
01/20/2018; 7:00 pm, FSSW		at No. 6 Baylor	L 50–75	11–8 (3–5)	Ferrell Center (6,131); Waco, TX
01/24/2018; 7:00 pm, Cox Kansas		No. 24 TCU	L 63–68	11–9 (3–6)	Bramlage Coliseum (3,381); Manhattan, KS
01/28/2018; 4:00 pm, FS1		at Kansas; Sunflower Showdown	W 63–59	12–9 (4–6)	Allen Fieldhouse (5,066); Lawrence, KS
01/31/2018; 10:30 am, FSOK		at Oklahoma	L 49–68	12–10 (4–7)	Lloyd Noble Center (7,245); Norman, OK
02/03/2018; 7:00 pm, ESPN3		Iowa State	L 45–80	12–11 (4–8)	Bramlage Coliseum (6,490); Manhattan, KS
02/07/2018; 7:00 pm, Cox Kansas		Texas Tech	W 83–69	13–11 (5–8)	Bramlage Coliseum (3,147); Manhattan, KS
02/10/2018; 7:00 pm, LHN		at No. 6 Texas	L 54–76	13–12 (5–9)	Frank Erwin Center (3,900); Austin, TX
02/17/2018; 2:00 pm, FSSW		at TCU	L 70–87	13–13 (5–10)	Schollmaier Arena (2,043); Fort Worth, TX
02/20/2018; 7:00 pm, ESPN3		West Virginia	L 66–75	13–14 (5–11)	Bramlage Coliseum (3,452); Manhattan, KS
02/24/2018; 3:00 pm, FSN		Kansas; Sunflower Showdown	W 93–67	14–14 (6–11)	Bramlage Coliseum (6,037); Manhattan, KS
02/26/2018; 6:30 pm, FSSW+		at Texas Tech	W 86–63	15–14 (7–11)	United Supermarkets Arena (3,084); Lubbock, TX
Big 12 Women's Tournament
03/02/2018; 8:30 pm, FCS	(8)	vs. (9) Kansas; First Round	W 72–63	16–14	Chesapeake Energy Arena; Oklahoma City, OK
03/03/2018; 1:30 pm, FSN	(8)	vs. (1) No. 3 Baylor; Quarterfinals	L 54–83	16–15	Chesapeake Energy Arena (4,047); Oklahoma City, OK
WNIT
03/15/2018*; 7:00 pm		Saint Louis; First Round	W 75–61	17–15	Bramlage Coliseum (1,254); Manhattan, KS
03/18/2018*; 5:00 pm		Utah; Second Round	W 74–57	18–15	Bramlage Coliseum (1,328); Manhattan, KS
03/23/2018*; 7:00 pm		UC Davis; Third Round	L 69–71	18–16	Bramlage Coliseum; Manhattan, KS
*Non-conference game. ^{#}Rankings from AP Poll / Coaches' Poll. (#) Tournament seedings in parentheses. All times are in Central Time.

== Rankings ==
2017–18 NCAA Division I women's basketball rankings

Regular season polls
Poll	Pre- Season	Week 2	Week 3	Week 4	Week 5	Week 6	Week 7	Week 8	Week 9	Week 10	Week 11	Week 12	Week 13	Week 14	Week 15	Week 16	Week 17	Week 18	Week 19	Final
AP	RV	RV	NR	RV	NR	NR	NR	NR	NR	NR	RV	NR	NR	NR	NR	NR	NR			N/A
Coaches	RV	N/A	RV	RV	NR	NR	NR	NR	NR	NR	NR	NR	NR	NR	NR	NR	NR			

Legend
	Increase in ranking
	Decrease in ranking
	No change
(RV)	Received votes
(NR)	Not ranked

== See also ==
- 2017–18 Kansas State Wildcats men's basketball team
