= 2018 Big 12 Conference women's basketball tournament =

- Classification: Division I
- Season: 2017–18
- Teams: 10
- Site: Chesapeake Energy Arena; Oklahoma City, Oklahoma
- Champions: Baylor (9th title)
- Winning coach: Kim Mulkey (9th title)
- MVP: Kalani Brown (Baylor)
- Attendance: 17,854 (overall); 3,520 (championship)
- Television: FCS-Central, FSN, FS1

2017–18 Big 12 Conference women's basketball standings
| | Conf. | | | | Overall |
| Team | W | | L | PCT | W | | L | PCT |
|---|---|---|---|---|---|---|---|---|
| No. 2 Baylor † | 18 | – | 0 | 1.000 | 33 | – | 2 | .943 |
| No. 8 Texas | 15 | – | 3 | .833 | 28 | – | 7 | .800 |
| Oklahoma State | 11 | – | 7 | .611 | 21 | – | 11 | .656 |
| Oklahoma | 11 | – | 7 | .611 | 16 | – | 15 | .516 |
| TCU | 9 | – | 9 | .500 | 23 | – | 13 | .639 |
| West Virginia | 8 | – | 10 | .444 | 25 | – | 12 | .676 |
| Iowa State | 7 | – | 11 | .389 | 14 | – | 17 | .452 |
| Kansas State | 7 | – | 11 | .389 | 18 | – | 16 | .529 |
| Kansas | 3 | – | 15 | .167 | 12 | – | 18 | .400 |
| Texas Tech | 1 | – | 17 | .056 | 7 | – | 23 | .233 |
† 2018 Big 12 Tournament winner Rankings from AP poll

The 2018 Big 12 Conference women's basketball tournament was the postseason women's basketball tournament for the Big 12 Conference, held March 2–5 in Oklahoma City at Chesapeake Energy Arena.

== Seeds ==
2018 Big 12 Conference women's basketball tournament seeds
| Seed | School | Conf. | Over. | Tiebreaker |
| 1 | ‡ - Baylor | 18–0 | 28–1 | |
| 2 | # - Texas | 15–3 | 24–5 | |
| 3 | # - Oklahoma State | 11–7 | 20–9 | 2–0 vs. OKLA |
| 4 | # - Oklahoma | 11–7 | 16–13 | 0–2 vs. OSU |
| 5 | # - TCU | 9–9 | 18–11 | |
| 6 | # - West Virginia | 8–10 | 20–10 | |
| 7 | Iowa State | 7–11 | 13-16 | 1–1 vs. KSU, 1–1 vs. TCU |
| 8 | Kansas State | 7–11 | 15-14 | 1–1 vs. ISU, 0-2 vs. TCU |
| 9 | Kansas | 3–15 | 12–17 | |
| 10 | Texas Tech | 1–17 | 7–21 | |
‡ – Big 12 Conference regular season champions, and tournament No. 1 seed. # - Received a single-bye in the conference tournament. Overall records include all games played in the Big 12 Conference tournament.

== Schedule ==
| Session | Game | Time | Matchup | Television | Attendance |
First round – Friday, March 2
| 1 | 1 | 6:03 pm | #8 Kansas State 72 vs #9 Kansas 63 | FCS-Central | 2,779 |
| 1 | 2 | 8:33 pm | #7 Iowa State 74 vs #10 Texas Tech 49 | FCS-Central | 2,779 |
Quarterfinals – Saturday, March 3
| 2 | 3 | 11:04 am | #5 TCU 90 vs #4 Oklahoma 83 | FSN | 4,047 |
| 2 | 4 | 1:57 pm | #1 Baylor 83 vs #8 Kansas State 54 | FSN | 4,047 |
| 3 | 5 | 6:03 pm | #2 Texas 81 vs #7 Iowa State 69 | FSN | 3,676 |
| 3 | 6 | 8:34 pm | #6 West Virginia 69 vs #3 Oklahoma State 60 | FSN | 3,676 |
Semifinals – Sunday, March 4
| 4 | 7 | 2:04 pm | #1 Baylor 94 vs #5 TCU 48 | FS1 | 3,832 |
| 4 | 8 | 4:34 pm | #2 Texas 68 vs #6 West Virginia 55 | FS1 | 3,832 |
Final – Monday, March 5
| 5 | 9 | 8:05 pm | #1 Baylor 77 vs #2 Texas 66 | FS1 | 3,520 |
Game times in CT. #-Rankings denote tournament seed

== Bracket ==
- All times are Central

First round Friday, March 2
8 | Kansas State | 72
9 | Kansas | 63
7 | Iowa State | 74
10 | Texas Tech | 49

Quarterfinals; Saturday, March 3
4 | Oklahoma | 83
5 | TCU | 90
1 | Baylor | 83
8 | Kansas State | 54
2 | Texas | 81
7 | Iowa State | 69
3 | Oklahoma State | 60
6 | West Virginia | 69

Semifinals; Sunday, March 4
5 | TCU | 48
1 | Baylor | 94
2 | Texas | 68
6 | West Virginia | 55

Championship game Monday, March 5
1 | Baylor | 77
2 | Texas | 69

== All-Tournament team ==
Most Outstanding Player – Kalani Brown, Baylor

| Player | Team |
|---|---|
| Kalani Brown | Baylor |
| Lauren Cox | Baylor |
| Alexis Morris | Baylor |
| Ariel Atkins | Texas |
| Brooke McCarty | Texas |

== See also ==
- 2018 Big 12 Conference men's basketball tournament
- 2018 NCAA Women's Division I Basketball Tournament
- 2017–18 NCAA Division I women's basketball rankings
