= 2017–18 Southeastern Conference women's basketball season =

2017–18 SEC Women's Basketball Season
- League: NCAA Division I
- Sport: Basketball
- Teams: 14

WNBA Draft
- Top draft pick: A'ja Wilson (South Carolina)
- Picked by: Las Vegas Aces, 1st overall

Regular season
- 2018 SEC Champions: Mississippi State

Tournament
- Champions: South Carolina
- Runners-up: Mississippi State

Basketball seasons
- ← 2016–17 2018–19 →

2017–18 SEC women's basketball standings
	Conf.				Overall
Team	W		L	PCT	W		L	PCT
No. 4 Mississippi State	16	–	0	1.000	37	–	2	.949
No. 7 South Carolina †	12	–	4	.750	29	–	7	.806
No. 18 Georgia	12	–	4	.750	26	–	7	.788
No. 12 Tennessee	11	–	5	.688	25	–	8	.758
No. 17 Missouri	11	–	5	.688	24	–	8	.750
No. 14 Texas A&M	11	–	5	.688	26	–	10	.722
No. 24 LSU	11	–	5	.688	19	–	10	.655
Alabama	7	–	9	.438	20	–	14	.588
Kentucky	6	–	10	.375	15	–	17	.469
Auburn	5	–	11	.313	14	–	15	.483
Arkansas	3	–	13	.188	13	–	18	.419
Florida	3	–	13	.188	11	–	19	.367
Vanderbilt	3	–	13	.188	7	–	24	.226
Ole Miss	1	–	15	.063	12	–	19	.387
† 2018 SEC tournament winner As of April 1, 2018; Rankings from AP poll

The 2017–18 Southeastern Conference women's basketball season began with practices in October 2017, followed by the start of the 2017–18 NCAA Division I women's basketball season in November. Conference play started in late December 2017 and concluded in February 2018, followed by the 2018 SEC women's basketball tournament at the Bridgestone Arena in Nashville, Tennessee.

== Pre-season ==
=== Pre-season team predictions ===
	Media	Coaches
1.	South Carolina	
2.	Mississippi State	
3.	Missouri	
4.	Tennessee	Texas A&M
5.	Texas A&M	Tennessee
6.	Kentucky	
7.	LSU	
8.	Georgia	
9.	Alabama	
10.	Auburn	Vanderbilt
11.	Vanderbilt	Auburn
12.	Florida	Ole Miss
13.	Ole Miss	Florida
14.	Arkansas	

=== Pre-season All-SEC teams ===
Media	Coaches
**A'ja Wilson South Carolina**	**Wilson**
Victoria Vivians Mississippi State	Vivians
Morgan William Mississippi State	William
Sophie Cunningham Missouri	Cunningham
Mercedes Russell Tennessee	Russell
	Raigyne Louis LSU
	Jaime Nared Tennessee
	Khaalia Hillsman Texas A&M

- Coaches select eight players
- Players in bold are choices for SEC Player of the Year

== Head coaches ==
Note: Stats shown are before the beginning of the season. Overall and SEC records are from time at current school.

Team	Head coach	Previous job	Seasons at school	Overall record	SEC record	NCAA tournaments	NCAA Final Fours	NCAA championships
Alabama	Kristy Curry	Texas Tech	5th	373–214	64–65	9	1	0
Arkansas	Mike Neighbors	Washington	1st	98–41	–	3	1	0
Auburn	Terri Williams-Flournoy	Georgetown	6th	231–180	30–52	4	0	0
Florida	Cameron Newbauer	Belmont	1st	79–50	–	2	0	0
Georgia	Joni Taylor	Georgia (ass't)	3rd	37–25	16–16	1	0	0
Kentucky	Matthew Mitchell	Memphis	11th	271–129	102–54	8	0	0
LSU	Nikki Fargas	UCLA	7th	185–109	48–46	7	0	0
Mississippi State	Vic Schaefer	Sam Houston State	6th	204–161	45–35	3	1	0
Missouri	Robin Pingeton	Illinois State	8th	458–257	36–40	4	0	0
Ole Miss	Matt Insell	Kentucky	5th	58–68	17–43	0	0	0
South Carolina	Dawn Staley	Temple	10th	393–160	97–45	12	2	1
Tennessee	Holly Warlick	Tennessee (ass't)	6th	128–46	60–20	5	0	0
Texas A&M	Gary Blair	Arkansas	15th	739–304	51–27	23	2	1
Vanderbilt	Stephanie White	Indiana	2nd	14–16	4–12	0	0	0

== Weekly rankings ==
Legend: ██ Increase in ranking. ██ Decrease in ranking. RV=Received votes. NR=No rank/vote.
		Pre	Wk 2	Wk 3	Wk 4	Wk 5	Wk 6	Wk 7	Wk 8	Wk 9	Wk 10	Wk 11	Wk 12	Wk 13	Wk 14	Wk 15	Wk 16	Wk 17	Wk 18	Final
Alabama	AP	NR	RV	RV	NR															
Alabama	C	NR																		
Arkansas	AP	NR																		
Arkansas	C	NR																		
Auburn	AP	NR																		
Auburn	C	NR																		
Florida	AP	NR																		
Florida	C	NR																		
Georgia	AP	NR	NR	RV	RV	NR	NR	NR	NR	NR	RV	RV	21	17	18	20	19	19		
Georgia	C	RV	RV	NR	NR	NR	NR	RV	NR	RV	24	20	18	18	19	19	18			
Kentucky	AP	RV	25	22	22	20	RV	NR												
Kentucky	C	RV	RV	22	23	RV	NR													
LSU	AP	RV	NR	NR	NR	NR	NR	NR	NR	NR	RV	NR	NR	RV	RV	RV	24	24		
LSU	C	RV	NR	NR	NR	NR	NR	NR	NR	NR	NR	NR	NR	NR	RV	RV	RV			
Mississippi State	AP	7	7	6	6	6	5	5	5	5	4	3	2	2	2	2	2	2		
Mississippi State	C	4	3	3	3	3	3	3	3	3	3	2	2	2	2	2	2			
Missouri	AP	16	23	23	19	17	16	16	16	15	12	11	11	15	15	13	11	14		
Missouri	C	16	19	18	17	16	16	16	16	13	12	11	15	15	13	9	13			
Ole Miss	AP	NR																		
Ole Miss	C	NR																		
South Carolina	AP	4	4	3	5	5	4	4	4	4	9	10	9	7	7	8	7	8		
South Carolina	Coaches	2	2	6	6	5	5	5	5	8	10	7	6	8	8	6	8			
Tennessee	AP	14	13	12	12	11	7	7	7	7	6	6	10	12	11	11	15	12		
Tennessee	Coaches	18	14	13	13	7	7	7	7	6	7	10	13	11	11	14	12			
Texas A&M	AP	20	19	19	18	21	19	19	22	19	17	16	15	14	14	17	17	15		
Texas A&M	C	RV	25	21	22	22	20	21	19	16	17	15	12	14	18	18	16			
Vanderbilt	AP	NR																		
Vanderbilt	C	NR																		

== Regular season matrix ==
This table summarizes the head-to-head results between teams in conference play.

	Alabama	Arkansas	Auburn	Florida	Georgia	Kentucky	LSU	Mississippi State	Missouri	Ole Miss	South Carolina	Tennessee	Texas A&M	Vanderbilt
vs. Alabama	–	1–1	1–0	0–1	0–0	1–0	0–1	1–0	1–0	0–0	1–0	0–0	1–0	0–1
vs. Arkansas	1–1	–	0–1	1–0	1–0	1–0	0–0	1–0	1–0	0–1	1–0	1–0	0–0	1–0
vs. Auburn	0–1	1–0	–	0–1	1–0	1–0	1–1	0–0	0–0	0–0	1–0	2–0	2–0	0–0
vs. Florida	1–0	0–1	1–0	–	1–0	1–0	1–0	2–0	1–0	1–1	0–0	0–0	0–0	0–0
vs. Georgia	0–0	0–1	0–1	0–1	–	0–1	1–0	1–0	0–1	0–1	0–0	0–0	0–1	0–2
vs. Kentucky	0–1	0–1	0–1	0–1	1–0	–	1–0	0–0	1–0	0–0	1–0	1–0	1–0	1–0
vs. LSU	1–0	0–1	1–1	0–1	0–1	0–1	–	1–0	0–1	0–0	0–0	0–1	1–0	0–1
vs. Mississippi State	0–1	0–1	0–0	0–2	0–1	0–0	0–1	–	0–1	0–2	0–1	0–0	0–0	0–0
vs. Missouri	0–1	0–0	0–0	0–1	1–0	0–1	1–0	1–0	–	0–1	1–1	0–1	0–0	0–1
vs. Ole Miss	0–0	1–0	0–0	1–1	1–0	0–0	0–0	2–0	1–0	–	1–0	1–0	1–0	1–0
vs. South Carolina	0–1	0–1	0–1	0–1	0–1	0–2	0–0	1–0	1–1	0–1	–	2–0	0–1	0–1
vs. Tennessee	1–0	0–1	0–1	0–1	0–1	0–1	1–0	1–0	1–0	0–1	0–2	–	1–1	0–2
vs. Texas A&M	0–1	0–1	0–2	0–1	1–0	0–1	1–1	1–1	0–0	0–1	1–0	1–1	–	0–1
vs. Vanderbilt	1–0	0–1	1–0	1–0	2–0	0–1	1–0	1–0	1–0	0–1	1–0	2–0	1–0	–
Total	7–9	3–13	5–11	3–13	12–4	6–10	11–5	16–0	11–5	1–15	12–4	11–5	11–5	3–13

== Attendance ==
Team	Arena	Capacity	Game 1	Game 2	Game 3	Game 4	Game 5	Game 6	Game 7	Game 8	Total	Average	% of capacity
Team	Arena	Capacity	Game 9	Game 10	Game 11	Game 12	Game 13	Game 14	Game 15	Game 16	Total	Average	% of capacity
Alabama	Coleman Coliseum	15,383	2,414	2,035	4,179	2,009	2,229	1,971	2,070	2,410	27,770	2,314	15%
Alabama	Coleman Coliseum	15,383	1,370	2,323	2,117	2,643					27,770	2,314	15%
Arkansas	Bud Walton Arena	19,368	4,719	1,739	1,132	1,139	1,821	1,481	1,388	1,701	17,721	1,172	6%
Arkansas	Bud Walton Arena	19,368	1,288	1,313							17,721	1,172	6%
Auburn	Auburn Arena	9,121	1,489	1,879	2,769	2,589	1,585	1,749	1,788	1,980	21,295	2,130	23%
Auburn	Auburn Arena	9,121	2,110	3,357							21,295	2,130	23%
Florida	O'Connell Center	10,133	1,509	1,143	2,989	1,009	1,512	1,008	1,054	1,008	20,886	1,492	15%
Florida	O'Connell Center	10,133	1,206	1,305	1,509	1,332	2,601	1,701			20,886	1,492	15%
Georgia	Stegeman Coliseum	10,523	3,292	2,194	2,115	2,084	3,390	4,290	6,942	2,137	41,901	3,223	31%
Georgia	Stegeman Coliseum	10,523	2,614	2,934	2,229	5,012	2,668				41,901	3,223	31%
Kentucky	Memorial Coliseum	10,000	4,313	4,256	4,710	4,276	4,561	4,071	5,871	4,753	62,992	5,249	52%
Kentucky	Memorial Coliseum	10,000	8,921	5,782	6,521	4,957					62,992	5,249	52%
LSU	Pete Maravich Assembly Center	13,215	2,353	1,665	2,011	1,746	2,020	2,525	1,765	4,333	18,418	2,302	17%
Mississippi State	Humphrey Coliseum	10,575	6,811	4,584	5,321	5,138	5,010	5,445	4,953	8,535	74,093	6,174	58%
Mississippi State	Humphrey Coliseum	10,575	5,398	7,161	9,010	6,727					74,093	6,174	58%
Missouri	Mizzou Arena	15,061	3,351	4,251	3,068	3,345	3,470	3,234	4,630	3,253	38,473	3,847	26%
Missouri	Mizzou Arena	15,061	4,652	5,219							38,473	3,847	26%
Ole Miss	The Pavilion at Ole Miss	9,500	8,302	7,042	817	1,112	6,297	873	8,229	1,155	42,257	3,521	37%
Ole Miss	The Pavilion at Ole Miss	9,500	1,018	1,323	931	5,158					42,257	3,521	37%
South Carolina	Colonial Life Arena	18,000	13,723	12,471	12,020	13,054	11,732	13,345	13,431	12,011	160,827	13,402	74%
South Carolina	Colonial Life Arena	18,000	14,763	12,844	13,433	18,000					160,827	13,402	74%
Tennessee	Thompson–Boling Arena	21,678	8,869	7,553	7,818	7,311	8,004	7,187	9,651	8,663	97,531	8,867	41%
Tennessee	Thompson–Boling Arena	21,678	10,023	13,436	9,016						97,531	8,867	41%
Texas A&M	Reed Arena	12,989	3,085	2,867	3,315	3,123	2,815	3,009	3,391	7,180	53,910	3,851	30%
Texas A&M	Reed Arena	12,989	3,886	4,316	3,662	5,053	4,702	3,506			53,910	3,851	30%
Vanderbilt	Memorial Gymnasium	14,316	2,866	5,367		2,495	2,292		2,330	2,153	27,067	2,707	19%
Vanderbilt	Memorial Gymnasium	14,316	2,112	2,212	2,231	3,009					27,067	2,707	19%

== Postseason ==
=== SEC tournament ===
- February 28–March 4 at the Bridgestone Arena, Nashville, Tennessee. Teams were seeded by conference record, with ties broken by record between the tied teams followed by record against the regular season champion, if necessary.

**2018 SEC women's basketball tournament seeds and results**
Seed	School	Conf.	Over.	Tiebreaker	First round February 28	Second round March 1	Quarterfinals March 2	Semifinals March 3	Championship March 4
1	‡†**Mississippi State**	16–0	32–1		Bye	Bye	vs. #9 Kentucky; **W, 81–58**	vs. #5 TAMU; **W, 70–55**	vs. #2 South Carolina; **L, 51–62**
2	†**South Carolina**	12–4	25–6	1–0 vs. UGA	Bye	Bye	vs. #7 Tennessee; **W, 73–62**	vs. #3 Georgia; **W, 71–49**	vs. #1 Mississippi State; **W, 62–51**
3	†**Georgia**	12–4	25–6	0–1 vs. SC	Bye	Bye	vs. #6 Missouri; **W, 55–41**	vs. #2 South Carolina; **L, 49–71**	
4	†**LSU**	11–5	19–9	1–0 vs. Missouri, 1–0 vs. UT, 1–1 vs. TAMU	Bye	Bye	vs. #5 TAMU; **L, 69–75**		
5	#**Texas A&M**	11–5	24–8	1–0 vs. Missouri, 1–1 vs. LSU, 1–1 vs. UT	Bye	vs. #13 Arkansas; **W, 82–52**	vs. #4 LSU; **W, 75–69**	vs. #1 Mississippi State; **L, 55–70**	
6	#**Missouri**	11–5	24–7	1–0 vs. UT, 0–1 LSU, 0–1 vs. TAMU	Bye	vs. #14 Ole Miss; **W, 59–50**	vs. #3 Georgia; **L, 41–55**		
7	#**Tennessee**	11–5	24–7	1–1 vs. TAMU, 0–1 vs. LSU, 0–1 vs. Missouri	Bye	vs. #10 Auburn; **W, 64–61**	vs. #2 South Carolina; **L, 62–73**		
8	#**Alabama**	7–9	17–13		Bye	vs. #9 Kentucky; **L, 64–79**			
9	#**Kentucky**	6–10	15–17		Bye	vs. #8 Alabama; **W, 79–64**	vs. #1 Mississippi State; **L, 58–81**		
10	#**Auburn**	5–11	14–15		Bye	vs. #7 Tennessee; **L, 61–64**			
11	**Florida**	3–13	11–19	1–0 vs. Vanderbilt, 1–0 vs. Arkansas	vs. #14 Ole Miss; **L, 42–48**				
12	**Vanderbilt**	3–13	7–24	0–1 vs. UF, 0–1 vs. Arkansas	vs. #13 Arkansas; **L, 76–88**				
13	**Arkansas**	3–13	13–18	0–1 vs. UF, 1–0 vs. Vanderbilt	vs. #12 Vanderbilt; **W, 88–76**	vs. #5 TAMU; **L, 52–82**			
14	**Ole Miss**	1–15	12–19		vs. #11 Florida; **W, 48–42**	vs. #6 Missouri; **L, 50–59**			
‡ – SEC regular season champions, and tournament No. 1 seed † – Received a double bye in the conference tournament # – Received a single bye in the conference tournament Overall records include all games played in the tournament.

=== NCAA Division I women's basketball tournament ===
Seed	Bracket	School	First round	Second round	Sweet 16	Elite 8	Final Four	Championship
1	Kansas City	Mississippi State	vs. #16 Nicholls State; **W, 95–50**	vs. #9 Oklahoma State; **W, 71–56**	vs. #4 NC State; **W, 71–57**	vs. #3 UCLA; **W, 89–73**	vs. #1 Louisville; **W, 73–63^{OT}**	vs. #1 Notre Dame; **L, 58–61**
2	Albany	South Carolina	vs. #15 NC A&T; **W, 63–52**	vs. #10 Virginia; **W, 66–56**	vs. #11 Buffalo; **W, 79–63**	vs. #1 Connecticut; **L, 65–94**		
3	Lexington	Tennessee	vs. #14 Liberty; **W, 100–60**	vs. #6 Oregon State; **L, 59–66**				
4	Albany	Georgia	vs. #13 Mercer; **W, 68–63**	vs. #5 Duke; **L, 40–66**				
4	Spokane	Texas A&M	vs. #13 Drake; **W, 89–76**	vs. #5 DePaul; **W, 80–79**	vs. #1 Notre Dame; **L, 84–90**			
5	Lexington	Missouri	vs. #12 Florida Gulf Coast; **L, 70–80**					
6	Spokane	LSU	vs. #11 Central Michigan; **L, 69–78**					
**# Bids: 7**	W–L (%):	Total: 12–6 (.667)	5–2 (.714)	3–2 (.600)	2–1 (.667)	1–1 (.500)	1–0 (1.000)	0–0 (–)

=== Women's National Invitation tournament ===
School	First round	Second round	Third round	Quarterfinals
Alabama (3–1)	vs. Southern; **W, 69–56**	vs. UCF; **W, 80–61**	vs. Georgia Tech; **W, 61–59**	vs. Virginia Tech; **L, 67–74**

=== WNBA draft ===
Pick	Player	WNBA team	School
1	A'ja Wilson	Las Vegas Aces	South Carolina
3	Diamond DeShields	Chicago Sky	Tennessee / Çukurova (Turkey)
8	Victoria Vivians	Indiana Fever	Mississippi State
13	Jaime Nared	Las Vegas Aces	Tennessee
22	Mercedes Russell	New York Liberty	Tennessee
25	Raigyne Louis	Las Vegas Aces	LSU
27	Mackenzie Engram	Atlanta Dream	Georgia
