= 2017–18 South Carolina Gamecocks women's basketball team =

Intercollegiate basketball season

2017–18 South Carolina Gamecocks women's basketball

SEC Tournament champions

NCAA tournament, Elite Eight
- Conference: Southeastern Conference

Ranking
- Coaches: No. 6
- AP: No. 7
- Record: 29–7 (12–4 SEC)
- Head coach: Dawn Staley (10th season)
- Assistant coaches: Lisa Boyer; Fred Chmiel; Jolette Law
- Home arena: Colonial Life Arena

2017–18 SEC women's basketball standings
	Conf.				Overall
Team	W		L	PCT	W		L	PCT
No. 4 Mississippi State	16	–	0	1.000	37	–	2	.949
No. 7 South Carolina †	12	–	4	.750	29	–	7	.806
No. 18 Georgia	12	–	4	.750	26	–	7	.788
No. 12 Tennessee	11	–	5	.688	25	–	8	.758
No. 17 Missouri	11	–	5	.688	24	–	8	.750
No. 14 Texas A&M	11	–	5	.688	26	–	10	.722
No. 24 LSU	11	–	5	.688	19	–	10	.655
Alabama	7	–	9	.438	20	–	14	.588
Kentucky	6	–	10	.375	15	–	17	.469
Auburn	5	–	11	.313	14	–	15	.483
Arkansas	3	–	13	.188	13	–	18	.419
Florida	3	–	13	.188	11	–	19	.367
Vanderbilt	3	–	13	.188	7	–	24	.226
Ole Miss	1	–	15	.063	12	–	19	.387
† 2018 SEC tournament winner As of April 1, 2018; Rankings from AP poll

The 2017–18 South Carolina Gamecocks women's basketball team represented the University of South Carolina during the 2017–18 NCAA Division I women's basketball season. The Gamecocks, led by tenth year head coach Dawn Staley, played their home games at the Colonial Life Arena and were members of the Southeastern Conference. A'ja Wilson returned for her senior season and delivered the best individual campaign in program history to that point, averaging 22.6 points, 11.8 rebounds, and 3.2 blocks per game. She won every major national player of the year award, including the Naismith, Wooden, and AP honors. The Gamecocks finished the season 29–7, 12–4 in SEC play to finish in a tie for second place. They defeated Tennessee, Georgia and Mississippi State, winning their fourth consecutive SEC women's tournament to earn an automatic bid to the NCAA women's tournament. They defeated North Carolina A&T and Virginia in the first and second rounds, Buffalo in the sweet sixteen before losing to Connecticut in the elite eight.

== Previous season ==
South Carolina finished the season 33–4 (14–2), winning the SEC Regular season, SEC Tournament Championship, and the NCAA National Championship. Heading into the NCAA tournament South Carolina was the #1 seed in the Stockton regional, where they defeated UNC Asheville, Arizona State, Quinnipiac, and Florida State, to win the Stockton region and get to the Final Four. In the Final Four, South Carolina defeated Stanford 62–53 to advance to the Championship game. On April 2, 2017, South Carolina defeated Mississippi State to win their first national championship. A'ja Wilson won the NCAA basketball tournament Most Outstanding Player award.

== Offseason ==
=== Departures ===
Name	Number	Pos.	Height	Year	Hometown	Notes
Alaina Coates	41	C	6'4"	Senior	Irmo, SC	Graduated/Declared to 2017 WNBA draft
Allisha Gray	10	G	6'0"	RS Junior	Sandersville, GA	Declared to 2017 WNBA draft
Kaela Davis	3	G	6'2"	RS Junior	Suwanee, GA	Declared to 2017 WNBA draft
Araion Bradshaw	12	G	5'6"	Freshman	Hyde Park, MA	Transferred to Dayton

=== Incoming transfers ===
Name	Number	Pos.	Height	Year	Hometown	Previous School
Te'a Cooper	2	G	5'8"	Sophomore	Powder Springs, GA	Transferred from Tennessee. Will sit out a year due to NCAA rules.
Lindsey Spann	11	G	5'6"	RS Senior	Laurel, MD	Transferred from Penn State. Eligible to play immediately since Spann graduated from Penn State University.

=== Recruits ===
College recruiting information
Name	Hometown	School	Height	Weight	Commit date
Elisia Grissett; W	Durham, NC	Hillside	6 ft 1 in (1.85 m)	N/A	
Elisia Grissett; W	Recruit ratings: ESPN: (97)				
Bianca Jackson; W	Montgomery, AL	Brewbaker Tech Magnet	5 ft 11 in (1.80 m)	N/A	
Bianca Jackson; W	Recruit ratings: ESPN: (96)				
LaDazhia Williams; G	Bradenton, FL	Lakewood Ranch	6 ft 2 in (1.88 m)	N/A	
LaDazhia Williams; G	Recruit ratings: ESPN: (96)				
Overall recruit ranking:
Note: In many cases, Scout, Rivals, 247Sports, On3, and ESPN may conflict in their listings of height and weight.; In these cases, the average was taken. ESPN grades are on a 100-point scale.; Sources: "2017 Player Commits". ESPN. Archived from the original on March 16, 2018.

== Roster ==
2017–18 South Carolina Gamecocks women's basketball team
Players
Coaches

Pos.	#	Name	Height	Year	Previous school	Hometown
G	0	Victoria Patrick	5 ft 8 in (1.73 m)	So	Edgewater	Orlando, FL
G	1	Bianca Cuevas-Moore	5 ft 6 in (1.68 m)	Sr	Nazareth Regional	Bronx, NY
G	2	Te'a Cooper	5 ft 8 in (1.73 m)	RS So	McEachern HS; Tennessee	Powder Springs, GA
G	4	Doniyah Cliney	6 ft 0 in (1.83 m)	Jr	Malcolm X Shabazz	Newark, NJ
G	10	Bianca Jackson	5 ft 10 in (1.78 m)	Fr	Brewbaker Tech Magnet	Montgomery, AL
G	11	Lindsey Spann	5 ft 6 in (1.68 m)	RS Sr	Good Counsel HS; Penn State	Laurel, MD
G	15	Tiffany Davis	5 ft 7 in (1.7 m)	RS Jr	Westbury Christian	Houston, TX
F	21	Mikiah Herbert Harrigan	6 ft 2 in (1.88 m)	So	Flanagan	Pembroke Pines, FL
F	22	A'ja Wilson	6 ft 5 in (1.96 m)	Sr	Heathwood Hall	Hopkins, SC
C	23	LaDaazhia Williams	6 ft 2 in (1.88 m)	Fr	Lakewood Ranch	Bradenton, FL
G	24	Lele Grissett	6 ft 0 in (1.83 m)	Fr	Hillside	Durham, NC
F	35	Alexis Jennings	6 ft 2 in (1.88 m)	RS Jr	Sparkman HS; Kentucky	Madison, AL
G	52	Tyasha Harris	5 ft 10 in (1.78 m)	So	Heritage Christian	Noblesville, IN

Head coach

- Dawn Staley (Virginia)

Assistant coach(es)

- Lisa Boyer (Ithaca)
- Fred Chmiel (Alaska–Anchorage)
- Jolette Law (Iowa)

Legend

- (C) Team captain
- (S) Suspended
- (I) Ineligible
- (W) Walk-on
- Injured
- Current redshirt

Roster

== Schedule ==
Date time, TV	Rank^{#}	Opponent^{#}	Result	Record	Site (attendance) city, state
Exhibition
11/03/2017*; 7:00 pm	No. 4	Coker	W 116–56		Colonial Life Arena; Columbia, SC
Regular season
11/10/2017*; 6:30 pm	No. 4	Alabama State	W 99–31	1–0	Colonial Life Arena (13,723); Columbia, SC
11/13/2017*; 7:00 pm, ESPN2	No. 4	at No. 15 Maryland	W 94–86	2–0	Xfinity Center (8,677); College Park, MD
11/16/2017*; 7:00 pm	No. 4	at Clemson; Rivalry	W 66–36	3–0	Littlejohn Coliseum (1,589); Clemson, SC
11/19/2017*; 3:00 pm	No. 4	Wofford	W 94–60	4–0	Colonial Life Arena (12,471); Columbia, SC
11/24/2017*; 1:30 pm	No. 3	vs. Rutgers; Gulf Coast Showcase Quarterfinals	W 78–68	5–0	Germain Arena; Estero, FL
11/25/2017*; 1:30 pm	No. 3	vs. St. John's; Gulf Coast Showcase semifinals	W 76–58	6–0	Germain Arena; Estero, FL
11/26/2017*; 1:30 pm	No. 3	vs. No. 6 Notre Dame; Gulf Coast Showcase championship	L 85–92	6–1	Germain Arena; Estero, FL
11/30/2017*; 7:00 pm	No. 5	Western Carolina	W 101–43	7–1	Colonial Life Arena (12,020); Columbia, SC
12/03/2017*; 12:00 pm, SECN	No. 5	No. 14 Duke	W 72–52	8–1	Colonial Life Arena (13,054); Columbia, SC
12/05/2017*; 7:00 pm	No. 5	College of Charleston	W 69–43	9–1	Colonial Life Arena (11,732); Columbia, SC
12/17/2017*; 3:00 pm	No. 4	Savannah State	W 99–38	10–1	Colonial Life Arena (13,345); Columbia, SC
12/21/2017*; 7:00 pm, ESPN3	No. 4	at Temple	W 87–60	11–1	Liacouras Center (3,185); Philadelphia, PA
12/31/2017; 2:00 pm, SECN	No. 4	No. 22 Texas A&M	W 61–59	12–1 (1–0)	Colonial Life Arena (13,431); Columbia, SC
01/04/2018; 7:00 pm	No. 4	at Ole Miss	W 88–62	13–1 (2–0)	The Pavilion at Ole Miss (1,018); Oxford, MS
01/07/2018; 2:00 pm, ESPN2	No. 4	at No. 16 Missouri	L 74–83	13–2 (2–1)	Mizzou Arena (4,652); Columbia, MO
01/11/2018; 7:00 pm	No. 9	Auburn	W 71–63	14–2 (3–1)	Colonial Life Arena (12,011); Columbia, SC
01/14/2018; 1:00 pm, ESPN2	No. 9	No. 6 Tennessee	L 70–86	14–3 (3–2)	Colonial Life Arena (14,763); Columbia, SC
01/18/2018; 8:00 pm	No. 10	at Vanderbilt	W 95–82	15–3 (4–2)	Memorial Gymnasium (2,231); Nashville, TN
01/21/2018; Noon, ESPNU	No. 10	at Kentucky	W 81–64	16–3 (5–2)	Rupp Arena (6,521); Lexington, KY
01/25/2018; 6:30 pm, SECN	No. 9	Arkansas	W 90–42	17–3 (6–2)	Colonial Life Arena (12,844); Columbia, SC
01/28/2018; 6:00 pm, ESPN2	No. 9	No. 11 Missouri	W 64–54	18–3 (7–2)	Colonial Life Arena (13,433); Columbia, SC
02/01/2018*; 7:00 pm, ESPN	No. 7	No. 1 Connecticut	L 58–83	18–4	Colonial Life Arena (18,000); Columbia, SC
02/05/2018; 7:00 pm, ESPN2	No. 7	at No. 2 Mississippi State	L 53–67	18–5 (7–3)	Humphrey Coliseum (10,794); Starkville, MS
02/08/2018; 7:00 pm, SECN	No. 7	at Alabama	W 79–66	19–5 (8–3)	Coleman Coliseum (2,313); Tuscaloosa, AL
02/11/2018; 1:00 pm, SECN	No. 7	Florida	W 64–57	20–5 (9–3)	Colonial Life Arena (15,385); Columbia, SC
02/15/2018; 7:00 pm	No. 8	at No. 20 Georgia	W 77–65	21–5 (10–3)	Stegeman Coliseum (4,072); Athens, GA
02/18/2018; 3:00 pm, SECN	No. 8	Kentucky	W 81–63	22–5 (11–3)	Colonial Life Arena (14,895); Columbia, SC
02/22/2018; 6:30 pm, SECN	No. 7	No. 24 LSU	W 57–48	23–5 (12–3)	Colonial Life Arena (12,385); Columbia, SC
02/25/2018; 4:00 pm, ESPN2	No. 7	at No. 15 Tennessee	L 46–65	23–6 (12–4)	Thompson–Boling Arena (13,058); Knoxville, TN
SEC Women's Tournament
03/02/2018; 7:00 pm, SECN	(2) No. 8	vs. (7) No. 12 Tennessee; Quarterfinals	W 73–62	24–6	Bridgestone Arena; Nashville, TN
03/03/2018; 7:30 pm, ESPNU	(2) No. 8	vs. (3) No. 19 Georgia; Semifinals	W 71–49	25–6	Bridgestone Arena (8,819); Nashville, TN
03/04/2018; 4:30 pm, ESPN2	(2) No. 8	vs. (1) No. 2 Mississippi State; Championship Game	W 62–51	26–6	Bridgestone Arena (8,215); Nashville, TN
NCAA Women's Tournament
03/16/2018*; 7:30 pm, ESPN2	(2 A) No. 7	(15 A) North Carolina A&T; First Round	W 63–52	27–6	Colonial Life Arena (11,085); Columbia, SC
03/18/2018*; 9:00 pm, ESPN	(2 A) No. 7	(10 A) Virginia; Second Round	W 66–56	28–6	Colonial Life Arena (10,037); Columbia, SC
03/24/2018*; 11:30 am, ESPN	(2 A) No. 7	vs. (11 A) Buffalo; Sweet Sixteen	W 79–63	29–6	Times Union Center (10,310); Albany, NY
03/26/2018*; 7:00 pm, ESPN	(2 A) No. 7	vs. (1 A) No. 7 Connecticut; Elite Eight	L 65–94	29–7	Times Union Center (9,522); Albany, NY
*Non-conference game. ^{#}Rankings from AP Poll. (#) Tournament seedings in parentheses. A=Albany Region. All times are in Eastern Time.

== Rankings ==
Ranking movements Legend: ██ Increase in ranking ██ Decrease in ranking
	Week																			
Poll	Pre	1	2	3	4	5	6	7	8	9	10	11	12	13	14	15	16	17	18	Final
AP	4	4	3	5	5	4	4	4	4	4	9	10	9	7	7	8	7	8	7	Not released
Coaches	2	2^	6	6	5	5	5	5	5	8	10	7	6	8	8	6	8	7	7	6

^Coaches' Poll did not release a second poll at the same time as the AP.

== Team players drafted into the WNBA ==
Round	Pick	Player	WNBA club
1	1	A'ja Wilson	Las Vegas Aces
