= 2017–18 Missouri Tigers women's basketball team =

Intercollegiate basketball season

2017–18 Missouri Tigers women's basketball

Cal Classic champions

NCAA tournament, first round
- Conference: Southeastern Conference

Ranking
- Coaches: No. 22
- AP: No. 17
- Record: 24–8 (11–5 SEC)
- Head coach: Robin Pingeton (8th season)
- Assistant coaches: Jenny Putnam; Ashleen Bracey
- Home arena: Mizzou Arena

2017–18 SEC women's basketball standings
| | Conf. | | | | Overall |
| Team | W | | L | PCT | W | | L | PCT |
|---|---|---|---|---|---|---|---|---|
| No. 4 Mississippi State | 16 | – | 0 | 1.000 | 37 | – | 2 | .949 |
| No. 7 South Carolina † | 12 | – | 4 | .750 | 29 | – | 7 | .806 |
| No. 18 Georgia | 12 | – | 4 | .750 | 26 | – | 7 | .788 |
| No. 12 Tennessee | 11 | – | 5 | .688 | 25 | – | 8 | .758 |
| No. 17 Missouri | 11 | – | 5 | .688 | 24 | – | 8 | .750 |
| No. 14 Texas A&M | 11 | – | 5 | .688 | 26 | – | 10 | .722 |
| No. 24 LSU | 11 | – | 5 | .688 | 19 | – | 10 | .655 |
| Alabama | 7 | – | 9 | .438 | 20 | – | 14 | .588 |
| Kentucky | 6 | – | 10 | .375 | 15 | – | 17 | .469 |
| Auburn | 5 | – | 11 | .313 | 14 | – | 15 | .483 |
| Arkansas | 3 | – | 13 | .188 | 13 | – | 18 | .419 |
| Florida | 3 | – | 13 | .188 | 11 | – | 19 | .367 |
| Vanderbilt | 3 | – | 13 | .188 | 7 | – | 24 | .226 |
| Ole Miss | 1 | – | 15 | .063 | 12 | – | 19 | .387 |
† 2018 SEC tournament winner As of April 1, 2018; Rankings from AP poll

The 2017–18 Missouri Tigers women's basketball team represented the University of Missouri in the 2017–18 NCAA Division I women's basketball season. The Tigers were led by eighth-year head coach Robin Pingeton. They played their games at Mizzou Arena and were members of the Southeastern Conference. They began the season ranked #16 in both the AP and Coaches Polls. They finished the season 24–8, 11–5 in SEC play to finish in a four-way tie for fourth place. They advanced to the quarterfinals of the SEC women's tournament, where they lost to Georgia. They received an at-large bid to the NCAA women's tournament, where they were upset by Florida Gulf Coast in the first round.

== Last season ==
The Tigers finished the 2016–17 season at 22–11, 11–5 in SEC play to tie for fourth place in the conference. They lost in the quarterfinals of the SEC women's tournament to Texas A&M. They received an at-large bid to the NCAA women's tournament, where they defeated South Florida in the first round before losing to Florida State in the second round.

== Roster ==
2017–18 Missouri Tigers women's basketball team
Players
Coaches

| Pos. | # | Name | Height | Year | Previous school | Hometown |
|---|---|---|---|---|---|---|
| G | 0 | Haley Troup | 5 ft 10 in (1.78 m) | Fr | Gadsden City | Gadsden, AL |
| G | 1 | Kelsey Winfrey | 5 ft 9 in (1.75 m) | Fr | Lebanon | Lebanon, MO |
| G | 2 | Jordan Roundtree | 5 ft 9 in (1.75 m) | So | Kirkwood | St. Louis, MO |
| G | 3 | Sophie Cunningham | 6 ft 1 in (1.85 m) | Jr | Rock Bridge | Columbia, MO |
| F | 4 | Bri Porter | 6 ft 3 in (1.91 m) | Sr | Rock Bridge | Columbia, MO |
| G | 5 | Lauren Aldridge (redshirt) | 5 ft 7 in (1.7 m) | Jr | Marshfield; Kansas | Marshfield, MO |
| G | 10 | Nadia Green | 5 ft 7 in (1.7 m) | Fr | Homewood-Flossmoor | Chicago, IL |
| G | 12 | Elle Brown | 5 ft 11 in (1.8 m) | Fr | Rock Bridge | Columbia, MO |
| F | 13 | Hannah Schuchts | 6 ft 2 in (1.88 m) | RS So | Maclay School | Tallahassee, FL |
| F | 20 | Kayla Michael | 6 ft 2 in (1.88 m) | RS Sr | Mason | Cincinnati, OH |
| F | 21 | Cierra Porter | 6 ft 4 in (1.93 m) | Jr | Rock Bridge | Columbia, MO |
| G/F | 22 | Jordan Frericks | 6 ft 1 in (1.85 m) | RS Sr | Quincy Notre Dame | Quincy, IL |
| G | 23 | Amber Smith | 5 ft 11 in (1.8 m) | So | Loyola College Prep | Shreveport, LA |
| G | 24 | Jordan Chavis | 5 ft 7 in (1.7 m) | So | Central Davidson | Lexington, NC |
| F | 25 | Emmanuelle Tahane | 6 ft 1 in (1.85 m) | Fr | Marcellin Berthelot | Bondy, France |

Head coach

- Robin Pingeton (St. Ambrose)

Assistant coach(es)

- Jenny Putnam (St. Ambrose)
- Ashleen Bracey (Illinois State)

Legend

- (C) Team captain
- (S) Suspended
- (I) Ineligible
- (W) Walk-on
- Injured
- Current redshirt

Roster
Last update: January 1, 2018

== Schedule and results ==
| Date time, TV | Rank^{#} | Opponent^{#} | Result | Record | Site (attendance) city, state |
Exhibition
| 11/02/2017*; 7:00 pm | No. 16 | Southwest Baptist | W 77–55 | | Mizzou Arena (1,595); Columbia, MO |
| 11/06/2017*; 7:00 pm | No. 16 | McKendree | W 80–30 | | Mizzou Arena (1,102); Columbia, MO |
Non-conference regular season
| 11/10/2017*; 2:30 pm | No. 16 | vs. Western Kentucky; Hawkeye Classic semifinals | L 76–79 | 0–1 | Carver–Hawkeye Arena (1,015); Iowa City, IA |
| 11/11/2017*; 2:00 pm | No. 16 | vs. Quinnipiac; Hawkeye Classic 3rd place game | W 66–51 | 1–1 | Carver–Hawkeye Arena (1,027); Iowa City, IA |
| 11/16/2017*; 7:00 pm | No. 23 | Wright State | W 82–80 | 2–1 | Mizzou Arena (3,351); Columbia, MO |
| 11/19/2017*; 2:00 pm, ESPN3 | No. 23 | at Missouri State | W 69–59 | 3–1 | JQH Arena (4,251); Springfield, MO |
| 11/24/2017*; 6:00 pm | No. 23 | vs. Coppin State; Cal Classic semifinals | W 72–50 | 4–1 | Haas Pavilion (722); Berkeley, CA |
| 11/25/2017*; 5:00 pm | No. 23 | at No. 21 California; Cal Classic championship | W 55–52 | 5–1 | Haas Pavilion (2,011); Berkeley, CA |
| 11/30/2017*; 7:00 pm, SECN | No. 19 | Kansas State; Big 12/SEC Women's Challenge | W 73–59 | 6–1 | Mizzou Arena (3,068); Columbia, MO |
| 12/02/2017*; 2:00 pm | No. 19 | New Orleans | W 81–45 | 7–1 | Mizzou Arena (3,345); Columbia, MO |
| 12/08/2017*; 7:00 pm | No. 17 | Saint Louis | W 70–58 | 8–1 | Mizzou Arena (3,470); Columbia, MO |
| 12/10/2017*; 2:00 pm | No. 17 | SIU Edwardsville | W 78–48 | 9–1 | Mizzou Arena (3,234); Columbia, MO |
| 12/17/2017*; 12:15 pm | No. 16 | vs. Indiana; West Palm Invitational | W 75–55 | 10–1 | Student Life Center (350); West Palm Beach, FL |
| 12/18/2017*; 4:00 pm | No. 16 | vs. Xavier; West Palm Invitational | W 74–48 | 11–1 | Student Life Center (350); West Palm Beach, FL |
| 12/22/2017*; 12:00 pm | No. 16 | Illinois; Braggin' Rights | W 72–55 | 12–1 | Mizzou Arena (4,630); Columbia, MO |
SEC regular season
| 12/31/2017; 2:00 pm | No. 16 | at Alabama | W 62–56 | 13–1 (1–0) | Coleman Coliseum (1,370); Tuscaloosa, AL |
| 01/04/2018; 7:00 pm | No. 15 | LSU | L 65–69 | 13–2 (1–1) | Mizzou Arena (3,253); Columbia, MO |
| 01/07/2018; 1:00 pm, ESPN2 | No. 15 | No. 4 South Carolina | W 83–74 | 14–2 (2–1) | Mizzou Arena (4,652); Columbia, MO |
| 01/11/2018; 7:00 pm | No. 12 | at Vanderbilt | W 81–70 | 15–2 (3–1) | Memorial Gymnasium (2,112); Nashville, TN |
| 01/18/2018; 8:00 pm, SECN | No. 11 | at Ole Miss | W 67–48 | 16–2 (4–1) | The Pavilion at Ole Miss (931); Oxford, MS |
| 01/21/2018; 4:00 pm, SECN | No. 11 | Arkansas | W 88–54 | 17–2 (5–1) | Mizzou Arena (5,219); Columbia, MO |
| 01/25/2018; 6:00 pm | No. 11 | at No. 21 Georgia | L 50–62 | 17–3 (5–2) | Stegeman Coliseum (2,668); Athens, GA |
| 01/28/2018; 5:00 pm, ESPN2 | No. 11 | at No. 9 South Carolina | L 54–64 | 17–4 (5–3) | Colonial Life Arena (13,433); Columbia, SC |
| 02/01/2018; 7:30 pm, SECN | No. 15 | No. 2 Mississippi State | L 53–57 | 17–5 (5–4) | Mizzou Arena (5,095); Columbia, MO |
| 02/05/2018; 6:00 pm, SECN | No. 15 | Florida | W 66–64 | 18–5 (6–4) | Mizzou Arena (3,164); Columbia, MO |
| 02/08/2018; 8:00 pm, SECN | No. 15 | Kentucky | W 83–78 | 19–5 (7–4) | Mizzou Arena (3,430); Columbia, MO |
| 02/11/2018; 4:00 pm, SECN | No. 15 | at Arkansas; Postponed (travel conditions), Rescheduled for February 12, 2018 | | | Bud Walton Arena; Fayetteville, AR |
| 02/12/2018; 6:00 pm | No. 13 | at Arkansas | W 84–58 | 20–5 (8–4) | Bud Walton Arena (1,766); Fayetteville, AR |
| 02/15/2018; 6:00 pm | No. 13 | at Auburn | W 59–51 | 21–5 (9–4) | Auburn Arena (1,759); Auburn, AL |
| 02/18/2018; 1:00 pm, ESPNU | No. 13 | No. 11 Tennessee | W 77–73 | 22–5 (10–4) | Mizzou Arena (11,092); Columbia, MO |
| 02/22/2018; 7:00 pm | No. 11 | Vanderbilt | W 83–68 | 23–5 (11–4) | Mizzou Arena (4,123); Columbia, MO |
| 02/25/2018; 3:00 pm, SECN | No. 11 | at No. 17 Texas A&M | L 63–82 | 23–6 (11–5) | Reed Arena (6,627); College Station, TX |
SEC Women's Tournament
| 03/01/2018; 8:30 pm, SECN | (6) No. 14 | vs. (14) Ole Miss; Second Round | W 59–50 | 24–6 | Bridgestone Arena (6,047); Nashville, TN |
| 03/02/2018; 8:30 pm, SECN | (6) No. 14 | vs. (3) No. 19 Georgia; Quarterfinals | L 44–55 | 24–7 | Bridgestone Arena (7,489); Nashville, TN |
NCAA Women's Tournament
| 03/17/2018*; 2:30 pm, ESPN2 | (5 L) No. 17 | vs. (12 L) Florida Gulf Coast; First Round | L 70–80 | 24–8 | Maples Pavilion; Stanford, CA |
*Non-conference game. ^{#}Rankings from AP Poll. (#) Tournament seedings in parentheses. L=Lexington Region. All times are in Central Time.

== Rankings ==
Ranking movements Legend: ██ Increase in ranking ██ Decrease in ranking
| | Week | | | | | | | | | | | | | | | | | | | |
| Poll | Pre | 1 | 2 | 3 | 4 | 5 | 6 | 7 | 8 | 9 | 10 | 11 | 12 | 13 | 14 | 15 | 16 | 17 | 18 | Final |
|---|---|---|---|---|---|---|---|---|---|---|---|---|---|---|---|---|---|---|---|---|
| AP | 16 | 16 | 23 | 23 | 19 | 16 | 16 | 16 | 16 | 15 | 12 | 11 | 11 | 15 | 15 | 13 | 11 | 14 | 16 | Not released |
| Coaches | 16 | 16 | 16^ | 19 | 18 | 17 | 16 | 16 | 15 | 13 | 12 | 11 | 15 | 15 | 13 | 9 | 13 | 14 | 15 | 22 |

^Coaches' Poll did not release a second poll at the same time as the AP.

== See also ==
- 2017–18 Missouri Tigers men's basketball team
