= 2017–18 Tennessee Lady Volunteers basketball team =

Intercollegiate basketball season

2017–18 Tennessee Lady Volunteers basketball

Cancún Challenge Riviera Division champions

NCAA tournament, second round
- Conference: Southeastern Conference

Ranking
- Coaches: No. 17
- AP: No. 12
- Record: 25–8 (11–5 SEC)
- Head coach: Holly Warlick (6th season)
- Assistant coaches: Dean Lockwood; Sharrona Reaves; Bridgette Gordon
- Home arena: Thompson–Boling Arena

2017–18 SEC women's basketball standings
	Conf.				Overall
Team	W		L	PCT	W		L	PCT
No. 4 Mississippi State	16	–	0	1.000	37	–	2	.949
No. 7 South Carolina †	12	–	4	.750	29	–	7	.806
No. 18 Georgia	12	–	4	.750	26	–	7	.788
No. 12 Tennessee	11	–	5	.688	25	–	8	.758
No. 17 Missouri	11	–	5	.688	24	–	8	.750
No. 14 Texas A&M	11	–	5	.688	26	–	10	.722
No. 24 LSU	11	–	5	.688	19	–	10	.655
Alabama	7	–	9	.438	20	–	14	.588
Kentucky	6	–	10	.375	15	–	17	.469
Auburn	5	–	11	.313	14	–	15	.483
Arkansas	3	–	13	.188	13	–	18	.419
Florida	3	–	13	.188	11	–	19	.367
Vanderbilt	3	–	13	.188	7	–	24	.226
Ole Miss	1	–	15	.063	12	–	19	.387
† 2018 SEC tournament winner As of April 1, 2018; Rankings from AP poll

The 2017–18 Tennessee Lady Volunteers basketball team represented the University of Tennessee in the 2017–18 college basketball season. The Lady Vols, led by sixth-year head coach Holly Warlick, played their games at Thompson–Boling Arena and are members of the Southeastern Conference.

In the November 24 Cancún Challenge game against Oklahoma State, Jaime Nared scored her 1,000th point. She is the 45th Lady Vol to do so in her career.

The Lady Vols finished the season 25–8, 11–5 for a third-place tie in SEC play. They lost in the second round of the SEC tournament to South Carolina. Nationally ranked twelfth at the end of the season, they received an at-large bid to the NCAA tournament where they defeated Liberty in the first round before losing to Oregon State in the second round.

== Previous season ==
The 2016–17 team finished the season 20–12, 10–6 for fifth place in SEC play. They lost in the second round of the 2017 SEC tournament to Alabama. They received an at-large bid to the 2017 NCAA women's tournament where they defeated Dayton in the first round before losing to Louisville in the second round.

== Roster ==
2017–18 Tennessee Lady Volunteers women's basketball team
Players
Coaches

Pos.	#	Name	Height	Year	Previous school	Hometown
G/F	0	Rennia Davis	6 ft 2 in (1.88 m)	Fr	Jean Ribault HS	Jacksonville, FL
G	1	Anastasia Hayes	5 ft 7 in (1.7 m)	Fr	Riverdale HS	Murfreesboro, TN
G	2	Evina Westbrook	6 ft 0 in (1.83 m)	Fr	South Salem HS	Salem, OR
C	5	Kamera Harris	6 ft 3 in (1.91 m)	So	Dutchtown HS	Hampton, GA
G/F	10	Meme Jackson	5 ft 11 in (1.8 m)	Jr	Blackman HS	Murfreesboro, TN
C	11	Kasiyahna Kushkituah	6 ft 4 in (1.93 m)	Fr	St. Francis HS	Atlanta, GA
F	13	Kortney Dunbar	6 ft 2 in (1.88 m)	Sr	Edwardsville HS	Edwardsville, IL
F	15	Cheridene Green	6 ft 3 in (1.91 m)	RS Jr	Harris Academy Beckenham; ASA College	London, England, UK
C	21	Mercedes Russell	6 ft 6 in (1.98 m)	RS Sr	Springfield HS	Springfield, OR
G/F	31	Jaime Nared	6 ft 2 in (1.88 m)	Sr	Westview HS	Portland, OR

Head coach

Holly Warlick (Tennessee)

Assistant coach(es)

Dean Lockwood (Army)
Sharrona Reaves (Alabama)
Bridgette Gordon (Tennessee)

Legend

- (C) Team captain
- (S) Suspended
- (I) Ineligible
- (W) Walk-on
- Injured
- Current redshirt

Roster

== Rankings ==
Ranking movements Legend: ██ Increase in ranking ██ Decrease in ranking
	Week																			
Poll	Pre	1	2	3	4	5	6	7	8	9	10	11	12	13	14	15	16	17	18	Final
AP	14	13	12	12	11	7	7	7	7	7	6	6	10	12	11	11	15	12	12	Not released
Coaches	18	14^	13	13	7	7	7	7	6	7	10	13	11	11	11	14	12	13	13	17

^Coaches' Poll did not release a second poll at the same time as the AP.

== Schedule and results ==
Date time, TV	Rank^{#}	Opponent^{#}	Result	Record	High points	High rebounds	High assists	Site (attendance) city, state
Exhibition
November 7, 2017*; 7:00 pm	No. 14	Carson–Newman	W 121–76		27 – Davis	13 – Davis	6 – Westbrook	Thompson–Boling Arena (7,612); Knoxville, TN
Regular season
November 12, 2017*; 2:00 pm	No. 14	ETSU	W 87–49	1–0	20 – Russell	13 – Nared	6 – Westbrook	Thompson–Boling Arena (8,869); Knoxville, TN
November 15, 2017*; 7:00 pm	No. 13	James Madison	W 89–60	2–0	25 – Nared	9 – Nared	8 – Hayes	Thompson–Boling Arena (7,553); Knoxville, TN
November 20, 2017*; 7:00 pm	No. 12	Wichita State	W 68–56	3–0	17 – Russell	10 – Davis	6 – Westbrook	Thompson–Boling Arena (7,818); Knoxville, TN
November 23, 2017*; 6:30 pm	No. 12	vs. No. 20 Marquette; Cancún Challenge Riviera Division	W 101–99 ^{OT}	4–0	26 – Nared	15 – Nared	6 – Nared	Hard Rock Hotel Riviera Maya Convention Center (982); Puerto Aventuras, Mexico
November 24, 2017*; 4:00 pm	No. 12	vs. Oklahoma State; Cancún Challenge Riviera Division	W 79–69	5–0	25 – Russell	10 – Davis	6 – Westbrook	Hard Rock Hotel Riviera Maya Convention Center; Puerto Aventuras, Mexico
November 25, 2017*; 4:00 pm	No. 12	vs. South Dakota; Cancún Challenge Riviera Division	W 69–49	6–0	12 – Hayes	9 – Nared	3 – Hayes	Hard Rock Hotel Riviera Maya Puerto Aventuras (982); Puerto Aventuras, Mexico
November 30, 2017*; 7:00 pm	No. 12	Central Arkansas	W 77–34	7–0	19 – Russell	10 – Russell	4 – Hayes	Thompson–Boling Arena (7,311); Knoxville, TN
December 3, 2017*; 2:00 pm	No. 12	Alabama State	W 104–51	8–0	22 – Russell	10 – Green	5 – Davis	Thompson–Boling Arena (8,004); Knoxville, TN
December 6, 2017*; 7:00 pm	No. 11	Troy	W 131–69	9–0	27 – Nared	13 – Green	12 – Westbrook	Thompson–Boling Arena (7,187); Knoxville, TN
December 10, 2017*; 3:00 pm, ESPN2	No. 11	No. 2 Texas	W 82–75	10–0	23 – Nared	13 – Nared	4 – Hayes	Thompson–Boling Arena (9,651); Knoxville, TN
December 17, 2017*; 5:00 pm	No. 7	at Long Beach State	W 90–61	11–0	15 – Jackson	11 – Nared	7 – Westbrook	Walter Pyramid (1,532); Long Beach, CA
December 21, 2017*; 9:00 pm, P12N	No. 7	at No. 18 Stanford; Rivalry	W 83–71	12–0	28 – Nared	10 – Russell	5 – Nared	Maples Pavilion (3,084); Stanford, CA
December 31, 2017; Noon, SECN	No. 7	at Kentucky; Rivalry	W 63–49	13–0 (1–0)	17 – Westbrook	11 – Davis	7 – Jackson	Rupp Arena (8,921); Lexington, KY
January 4, 2018; 7:00 pm	No. 7	Auburn	W 70–59	14–0 (2–0)	19 – Nared	11 – Nared	6 – Westbrook	Thompson–Boling Arena (8,663); Knoxville, TN
January 7, 2018; Noon, SECN	No. 7	Vanderbilt; Rivalry	W 86–73	15–0 (3–0)	33 – Russell	8 – Jackson	7 – Hayes	Thompson–Boling Arena (10,023); Knoxville, TN
January 11, 2018; 7:00 pm, SECN	No. 6	at No. 17 Texas A&M	L 76–79 ^{OT}	15–1 (3–1)	21 – Russell	10 – Russell	7 – Westbrook	Reed Arena (5,043); College Station, TX
January 14, 2018; 1:00 pm, ESPN2	No. 6	at No. 9 South Carolina	W 86–70	16–1 (4–1)	21 – Nared	12 – Russell	5 – Westbrook	Colonial Life Arena (14,763); Columbia, SC
January 18, 2018*; 7:00 pm, ESPN	No. 6	at No. 5 Notre Dame	L 70–84	16–2	18 – Jackson	7 – Russell	4 – Westbrook	Edmund P. Joyce Center (8,733); Notre Dame, IN
January 21, 2018; 3:00 pm, ESPN2	No. 6	No. 3 Mississippi State	L 52–71	16–3 (4–2)	16 – Russell	10 – Davis	6 – Westbrook	Thompson–Boling Arena (13,436); Knoxville, TN
January 25, 2018; 7:00 pm	No. 10	Ole Miss	W 75–66	17–3 (5–2)	18 – Davis	10 – Nared	5 – Westbrook	Thompson–Boling Arena (9,016); Knoxville, TN
January 28, 2018; 1:00 pm, SECN	No. 10	at LSU	L 59–70	17–4 (5–3)	14 – Russell	10 – Russell	7 – Westbrook	Pete Maravich Assembly Center (4,333); Baton Rouge, LA
February 1, 2018; 6:30 pm, SECN	No. 12	No. 14 Texas A&M	W 82–67	18–4 (6–3)	23 – Nared	13 – Russell	6 – Westbrook	Thompson–Boling Arena (8,841); Knoxville, TN
February 4, 2018; 2:00 pm, ESPNU	No. 12	at Vanderbilt; Rivalry	W 74–64	19–4 (7–3)	30 – Nared	14 – Nared	4 – Westbrook	Memorial Gymnasium (4,771); Nashville, TN
February 8, 2018; 8:00 pm	No. 11	at Arkansas	W 90–85	20–4 (8–3)	33 – Davis	14 – Davis	9 – Hayes	Bud Walton Arena (1,446); Fayetteville, AR
February 11, 2018; 3:00 pm, SECN	No. 11	No. 18 Georgia	W 64–46	21–4 (9–3)	15 – Nared	15 – Russell	3 – Tied	Thompson–Boling Arena (12,523); Knoxville, TN
February 15, 2018; 6:30 pm, SECN	No. 11	Alabama	L 63–72	21–5 (9–4)	22 – Nared	11 – Russell	4 – Jackson	Thompson–Boling Arena (8,432); Knoxville, TN
February 18, 2018; 2:00 pm, ESPNU	No. 11	at No. 13 Missouri	L 73–77	21–6 (9–5)	25 – Nared	9 – Russell	2 – Tied	Mizzou Arena (11,092); Columbia, MO
February 22, 2018; 7:00 pm	No. 15	at Florida	W 70–42	22–6 (10–5)	13 – Tied	10 – Davis	3 – Tied	O'Connell Center (1,669); Gainesville, FL
February 25, 2018; 4:00 pm, ESPN2	No. 15	No. 7 South Carolina	W 65–46	23–6 (11–5)	18 – Davis	12 – Russell	4 – Davis	Thompson–Boling Arena (13,058); Knoxville, TN
SEC women's tournament
March 1, 2018; 7:00 pm, SECN	(7) No. 12	vs. (10) Auburn; Second Round	W 64–61	24–6	17 – Nared	15 – Russell	4 – Nared	Bridgestone Arena (6,047); Nashville, TN
March 2, 2018; 7:00 pm, SECN	(7) No. 12	vs. (2) No. 8 South Carolina; Quarterfinals	L 62–73	24–7	15 – Nared	13 – Nared	4 – Hayes	Bridgestone Arena; Nashville, TN
NCAA women's tournament
March 16, 2018*; 2:30 pm, ESPN2	(3 L) No. 12	(14 L) Liberty; First Round	W 100–60	25–7	18 – Davis	12 – Green	6 – Westbrook	Thompson–Boling Arena (4,509); Knoxville, TN
March 18, 2018*; 2:00 pm, ESPN2	(3 L) No. 12	(6 L) No. 13 Oregon State; Second Round	L 59–66	25–8	21 – Russell	14 – Russell	5 – Nared	Thompson–Boling Arena (4,338); Knoxville, TN
*Non-conference game. ^{#}Rankings from AP Poll. (#) Tournament seedings in parentheses. L=Lexington Region. All times are in Eastern Time.

== See also ==
- 2017–18 Tennessee Volunteers basketball team
