= 2017–18 Ole Miss Rebels women's basketball team =

Intercollegiate basketball season

2017–18 Ole Miss Rebels women's basketball
- Conference: Southeastern Conference
- Record: 12–19 (1–15 SEC)
- Head coach: Matt Insell (5th season)
- Assistant coaches: Alex Simmons; Brittany Hudson; George Porcha
- Home arena: The Pavilion at Ole Miss

2017–18 SEC women's basketball standings
	Conf.				Overall
Team	W		L	PCT	W		L	PCT
No. 4 Mississippi State	16	–	0	1.000	37	–	2	.949
No. 7 South Carolina †	12	–	4	.750	29	–	7	.806
No. 18 Georgia	12	–	4	.750	26	–	7	.788
No. 12 Tennessee	11	–	5	.688	25	–	8	.758
No. 17 Missouri	11	–	5	.688	24	–	8	.750
No. 14 Texas A&M	11	–	5	.688	26	–	10	.722
No. 24 LSU	11	–	5	.688	19	–	10	.655
Alabama	7	–	9	.438	20	–	14	.588
Kentucky	6	–	10	.375	15	–	17	.469
Auburn	5	–	11	.313	14	–	15	.483
Arkansas	3	–	13	.188	13	–	18	.419
Florida	3	–	13	.188	11	–	19	.367
Vanderbilt	3	–	13	.188	7	–	24	.226
Ole Miss	1	–	15	.063	12	–	19	.387
† 2018 SEC tournament winner As of April 1, 2018; Rankings from AP poll

The 2017–18 Ole Miss Rebels women's basketball team represented the University of Mississippi during the 2017–18 NCAA Division I women's basketball season. The Rebels, led by fifth year head coach Matt Insell, played their home games at the Pavilion at Ole Miss and were members of the Southeastern Conference (SEC).

The Rebels finished the season with a 12–19 overall record and a 1–15 record in conference play. On March 2, one day after the Rebels ended their season with a loss to Missouri in the second round of the SEC Tournament, head coach Matt Insell was fired. He finished at Ole Miss with an overall record of 70–87, including an 18–62 record in SEC play.

== Previous season ==
They finished the season 17–14, 6–10 in SEC play to finish in tenth place. They lost in the second round of the SEC women's basketball tournament to LSU. They were invited to the Women's National Invitation Tournament where they got upset by Grambling State in the first round.

== Roster ==
2017–18 Ole Miss Rebels women's basketball team
Players
Coaches

Pos.	#	Name	Height	Year	Previous school	Hometown
G	0	Chyna Nixon	5 ft 9 in (1.75 m)	Fr	Neumann Goretti HS	Philadelphia, PA
G	1	Bree Glover	5 ft 10 in (1.78 m)	So	Glasgow HS	Glasgow, MS
G	2	Marlee Hatcher	5 ft 7 in (1.7 m)	Jr	Pontotc HS; Itawamba CC	Pontotoc, MS
F/C	10	Cecilia Muhate	6 ft 2 in (1.88 m)	Jr	Arturo Soria	Madrid, Spain
G	11	Mimi Reid	5 ft 8 in (1.73 m)	Fr	The Patrick School	Bronx, NY
G	12	Barbara Johnson	5 ft 8 in (1.73 m)	Jr	The Rock School; Chipola College	Toronto, ON
G	20	Madinah Muhammad	5 ft 8 in (1.73 m)	Jr	Whitney Young HS	Chicago, IL
G	21	Chrishae Rowe	5 ft 10 in (1.78 m)	RS Sr	Santiago HS; Kentucky	Riverside, CA
G	23	Shandricka Sessom	5 ft 10 in (1.78 m)	Sr	Byhalia HS	Byhalia, MS
G	25	Alissa Alston	5 ft 8 in (1.73 m)	Jr	Upper Room Christian Academy	New Haven, CT
F	32	Katie Rogers	6 ft 2 in (1.88 m)	So	Wenonah HS	Birmingham, AL
F/C	42	Shelby Gibson	6 ft 3 in (1.91 m)	So	Oakland HS	Murfreesboro, TN
G	44	Torri Lewis	5 ft 11 in (1.8 m)	Jr	Homeschool	Olive Branch, MS
F	55	Promise Taylor	6 ft 5 in (1.96 m)	Fr	Sammamish HS	Issaquah, WA

Head coach

- Matt Insell (Middle Tennessee)

Assistant coach(es)

- Alex Simmons (Tennessee)
- Brittany Hudson (Georgia State)
- George Porcha (New Haven)

Legend

- (C) Team captain
- (S) Suspended
- (I) Ineligible
- (W) Walk-on
- Injured
- Current redshirt

Roster
Last update: January 15, 2018

== Schedule ==
Date time, TV	Rank^{#}	Opponent^{#}	Result	Record	Site (attendance) city, state
Exhibition
11/02/2017*; 6:00 pm		Mississippi College	W 66–35		The Pavilion at Ole Miss; Oxford, MS
Non-conference regular season
11/10/2017*; 5:00 pm		Northwestern State	W 75–44	1–0	The Pavilion at Ole Miss (8,302); Oxford, MS
11/13/2017*; 7:30 pm		Kennesaw State	W 92–63	2–0	The Pavilion at Ole Miss (7,042); Oxford, MS
11/17/2017*; 4:00 pm		vs. Saint Louis; Maggie Dixon Classic semifinals	L 64–79	2–1	Wintrust Arena (1,692); Chicago, IL
11/18/2017*; 6:30 pm		vs. Delaware State; Maggie Dixon Classic 3rd place game	W 110–58	3–1	Wintrust Arena (1,964); Chicago, IL
11/21/2017*; 2:00 pm		Troy	W 96–93	4–1	The Pavilion at Ole Miss (817); Oxford, MS
11/25/2017*; 1:00 pm		at Temple	W 64–48	5–1	McGonigle Hall (1,187); Philadelphia, PA
11/29/2017*; 7:00 pm, SECN		Middle Tennessee	W 65–56	6–1	The Pavilion at Ole Miss (1,112); Oxford, MS
12/02/2017*; 3:00 pm		Arkansas State	W 74–48	7–1	The Pavilion at Ole Miss (6,297); Oxford, MS
12/09/2017*; 1:00 pm		South Alabama	W 66–59	8–1	The Pavilion at Ole Miss (873); Oxford, MS
12/12/2017*; 11:00 am		Southern Miss	W 68–59	9–1	The Pavilion at Ole Miss (8,229); Oxford, MS
12/17/2017*; 3:00 pm, P12N		at No. 9 Oregon	L 46–90	9–2	Matthew Knight Arena (2,683); Eugene, OR
12/19/2017*; 10:00 pm		at Portland State	L 79–94	9–3	Pamplin Sports Center (254); Eugene, OR
12/28/2017*; 2:00 pm		Texas Southern	W 73–58	10–3	The Pavilion at Ole Miss (1,155); Oxford, MS
SEC regular season
12/31/2017; 2:00 pm		at Arkansas	L 72–73	10–4 (0–1)	Bud Walton Arena (1,701); Fayetteville, AR
01/04/2018; 6:00 pm		No. 4 South Carolina	L 62–88	10–5 (0–2)	The Pavilion at Ole Miss (1,018); Oxford, MS
01/07/2018; 2:00 pm		Florida	W 78–75 ^{2OT}	11–5 (1–2)	The Pavilion at Ole Miss (1,323); Oxford, MS
01/11/2018; 8:00 pm, SECN		at No. 4 Mississippi State	L 45–76	11–6 (1–3)	Humphrey Coliseum (7,161); Starkville, MS
01/18/2018; 8:00 pm, SECN		No. 11 Missouri	L 48–67	11–7 (1–4)	The Pavilion at Ole Miss (931); Oxford, MS
01/21/2018; 12:00 pm, SECN		at Florida	L 60–61	11–8 (1–5)	O'Connell Center (2,601); Gainesville, FL
01/25/2018; 6:00 pm		at No. 10 Tennessee	L 66–75	11–9 (1–6)	Thompson–Boling Arena (9,016); Knoxville, TN
01/28/2018; 1:00 pm, ESPNU		No. 2 Mississippi State	L 49–69	11–10 (1–7)	The Pavilion at Ole Miss (5,158); Oxford, MS
02/01/2018; 6:00 pm		Vanderbilt	L 72–75	11–11 (1–8)	The Pavilion at Ole Miss (1,279); Oxford, MS
02/04/2018; 1:00 pm		at No. 17 Georgia	L 45–69	11–12 (1–9)	Stegeman Coliseum (4,700); Athens, GA
02/08/2018; 7:00 pm		at No. 14 Texas A&M	L 54–83	11–13 (1–10)	Reed Arena (3,252); College Station, TX
02/11/2018; 2:00 pm		Alabama	L 79–82	11–14 (1–11)	The Pavilion at Ole Miss (1,641); Oxford, MS
02/15/2018; 7:00 pm		at LSU	L 55–84	11–15 (1–12)	Maravich Center (1,759); Baton Rouge, LA
02/19/2018; 6:00 pm, SECN		No. 19 Georgia	L 52–66	11–16 (1–13)	The Pavilion at Ole Miss (1,209); Oxford, MS
02/22/2018; 7:30 pm, SECN		Kentucky	L 71–79	11–17 (1–14)	The Pavilion at Ole Miss (1,141); Oxford, MS
02/25/2018; 1:00 pm, SECN		at Auburn	L 55–60	11–18 (1–15)	Auburn Arena (3,111); Auburn, AL
SEC Women's Tournament
02/28/2018; 1:30 pm, SECN	(14)	vs. (11) Florida; First Round	W 48–43	12–18	Bridgestone Arena (4,371); Nashville, TN
03/01/2018; 8:00 pm, SECN	(14)	vs. (6) No. 14 Missouri; Second Round	L 50–59	12–19	Bridgestone Arena (6,047); Nashville, TN
*Non-conference game. ^{#}Rankings from AP Poll. (#) Tournament seedings in parentheses. All times are in Central Time.

== Rankings ==
2017–18 NCAA Division I women's basketball rankings

Regular season polls
Poll	Pre- season	Week 2	Week 3	Week 4	Week 5	Week 6	Week 7	Week 8	Week 9	Week 10	Week 11	Week 12	Week 13	Week 14	Week 15	Week 16	Week 17	Week 18	Week 19	Final
AP	NR	NR	NR	NR	NR	NR	NR	NR	NR	NR	NR									N/A
Coaches	NR	N/A	NR	NR	RV	RV	RV	NR	NR	NR	NR									

Legend
	Increase in ranking
	Decrease in ranking
	No change
(RV)	Received votes
(NR)	Not ranked

== See also ==
•2018 Ole Miss Rebels football team
•2017-18 Ole Miss Rebels men's basketball team
•2018 Ole Miss Rebels baseball team
