= 2017–18 Auburn Tigers women's basketball team =

Intercollegiate basketball season

2017–18 Auburn Tigers women's basketball
- Conference: Southeastern Conference
- Record: 14–15 (5–11 SEC)
- Head coach: Terri Williams-Flournoy (6th season)
- Assistant coaches: Ty Evans; Adrian Walters; Clarisse Garcia
- Home arena: Auburn Arena

2017–18 SEC women's basketball standings
	Conf.				Overall
Team	W		L	PCT	W		L	PCT
No. 4 Mississippi State	16	–	0	1.000	37	–	2	.949
No. 7 South Carolina †	12	–	4	.750	29	–	7	.806
No. 18 Georgia	12	–	4	.750	26	–	7	.788
No. 12 Tennessee	11	–	5	.688	25	–	8	.758
No. 17 Missouri	11	–	5	.688	24	–	8	.750
No. 14 Texas A&M	11	–	5	.688	26	–	10	.722
No. 24 LSU	11	–	5	.688	19	–	10	.655
Alabama	7	–	9	.438	20	–	14	.588
Kentucky	6	–	10	.375	15	–	17	.469
Auburn	5	–	11	.313	14	–	15	.483
Arkansas	3	–	13	.188	13	–	18	.419
Florida	3	–	13	.188	11	–	19	.367
Vanderbilt	3	–	13	.188	7	–	24	.226
Ole Miss	1	–	15	.063	12	–	19	.387
† 2018 SEC tournament winner As of April 1, 2018; Rankings from AP poll

The 2017–18 Auburn Tigers women's basketball team represented Auburn University during the 2017–18 NCAA Division I women's basketball season. The Tigers, led by sixth-year head coach Terri Williams-Flournoy, played their home games at Auburn Arena as members of the Southeastern Conference. They finished the season 14–15, 5–11 in SEC play to finish in tenth place. They lost in the second round of the SEC women's tournament to Tennessee.

== Roster ==
2017–18 Auburn Tigers women's basketball team
Players
Coaches

Pos.	#	Name	Height	Year	Previous school	Hometown
G	0	Daisa Alexander	5 ft 8 in (1.73 m)	So	Southwest DeKalb	Decatur, GA
G	2	Bria Johnson	5 ft 8 in (1.73 m)	Sr	Episcopal	Baton Rouge, LA
G	3	Erica Sanders	5 ft 10 in (1.78 m)	Jr	Johnson	San Antonio, TX
F	4	Abigayle Jackson	6 ft 3 in (1.91 m)	Fr	Little Rock Central	Little Rock, AR
G	5	Emari Jones	5 ft 10 in (1.78 m)	Jr	Wheaton North; Shawnee CC	Chicago, IL
F	10	Kiyae' White	6 ft 2 in (1.88 m)	Fr	Emmaus	acungie, PA
C	12	Justice Wright	6 ft 4 in (1.93 m)	RS Jr	Houston County; Clemson	Warner Robins, GA
G	14	Tiffany Lewis	5 ft 8 in (1.73 m)	RS Sr	Riverdale; Clemson	Chattanooga, TN
F	15	Jazmine Jones	6 ft 2 in (1.88 m)	Sr	West Forsyth	Winston-Salem, NC
F	20	Unique Thompson	6 ft 3 in (1.91 m)	Fr	Faith Academy	Theodore, AL
G	21	Isabella Lopez	5 ft 7 in (1.7 m)	Fr	Northeast HS	Broward, FL
G	22	Crystal Primm (redshirt)	5 ft 11 in (1.8 m)	Jr	Oxbridge Academy; Duke	West Palm Beach, FL
G	23	Jessica Jones	6 ft 2 in (1.88 m)	Sr	West Forsyth	Winston-Salem, NC
G	32	Sira Toure	6 ft 2 in (1.88 m)	Sr	Kamiakin; Weber State	Kennewick, WA
G	33	Janiah McKay	5 ft 6 in (1.68 m)	Jr	Gainesville	Gainesville, FL

Head coach

- Terri Williams-Flournoy (Penn State)

Assistant coach(es)

- Ty Evans (UW–Whitewater)
- Adrian Walters (Saint Francis (PA))
- Clairsse Garcia (Villanova)

Legend

- (C) Team captain
- (S) Suspended
- (I) Ineligible
- (W) Walk-on
- Injured
- Current redshirt

Roster

== Schedule ==
Date time, TV	Rank^{#}	Opponent^{#}	Result	Record	Site (attendance) city, state
Non-conference regular season
11/13/2017*; 6:00 pm, ACCN Extra		at Virginia Tech	L 63–72	0–1	Cassell Coliseum (2,156); Blacksburg, VA
11/16/2017*; 6:00 pm		North Carolina A&T	W 63–53	1–1	Auburn Arena (1,489); Auburn, AL
11/19/2017*; 6:00 pm		Louisiana Tech	W 75–59	2–1	Auburn Arena (1,879); Auburn, AL
11/24/2017*; 7:30 pm		vs. Georgetown; Challenge in Music City	W 60–40	3–1	Nashville Municipal Auditorium; Nashville, TN
11/25/2017*; 5:00 pm		vs. Northwestern; Challenge in Music City	L 48–49	3–2	Nashville Municipal Auditorium; Nashville, TN
11/26/2017*; 4:30 pm		vs. Chattanooga; Challenge in Music City	L 44–54	3–3	Nashville Municipal Auditorium; Nashville, TN
11/29/2017*; 6:00 pm		Louisiana–Monroe	W 67–41	4–3	Auburn Arena (2,769); Auburn, AL
12/03/2017*; 1:00 pm		at Indiana	W 65–53	5–3	Simon Skjodt Assembly Hall (2,966); Bloomington, IN
12/08/2017*; 7:00 pm		at Louisiana	W 70–60	6–3	Cajundome (826); Lafayette, LA
12/09/2017*; 6:30 pm		Southern	W 65–47	7–3	Auburn Arena (2,589); Auburn, AL
12/19/2017*; 6:00 pm		Southeastern Louisiana	W 80–46	8–3	Auburn Arena (1,585); Auburn, AL
12/28/2017*; 6:00 pm		Xavier (LA)	W 70–44	9–3	Auburn Arena (1,749); Auburn, AL
SEC regular season
12/31/2017; 3:00 pm, ESPN2		Florida	W 84–55	10–3 (1–0)	Auburn Arena (1,788); Auburn, AL
01/04/2017; 6:00 pm		at No. 7 Tennessee	L 59–70	10–4 (1–1)	Thompson–Boling Arena (8,663); Knoxville, TN
01/07/2018; 2:00 pm		No. 19 Texas A&M	L 73–82	10–5 (1–2)	Auburn Arena (1,980); Auburn, AL
01/11/2018; 6:00 pm		at No. 9 South Carolina	L 63–71	10–6 (1–3)	Colonial Life Arena (12,011); Columbia, SC
01/14/2018; 4:00 pm, SECN		Arkansas	L 58–68	10–7 (1–4)	Auburn Arena (2,110); Auburn, AL
01/18/2018; 7:00 pm		at LSU	L 56–59	10–8 (1–5)	Pete Maravich Assembly Center (1,765); Baton Rouge, LA
01/21/2018; 2:00 pm, SECN		at Georgia	L 48–60	10–9 (1–6)	Stegeman Coliseum (5,012); Athens, GA
01/28/2018; 4:00 pm, SECN		Alabama	W 69–60	11–9 (2–6)	Auburn Arena (3,357); Auburn, AL
02/01/2018; 6:00 pm		at Kentucky	L 48–65	11–10 (2–7)	Memorial Coliseum (4,151); Lexington, KY
02/04/2018; 3:00 pm, SECN		at No. 14 Texas A&M	L 59–78	11–11 (2–8)	Reed Arena (5,127); College Station, TX
02/08/2018; 6:00 pm		LSU	W 70–62	12–11 (3–8)	Auburn Arena (1,916); Auburn, AL
02/12/2018; 6:00 pm, SECN		Vanderbilt	W 63–60	13–11 (4–8)	Auburn Arena (1,758); Auburn, AL
02/15/2018; 6:00 pm		No. 13 Missouri	L 51–59	13–12 (4–9)	Auburn Arena (1,759); Auburn, AL
02/18/2018; 4:00 pm, SECN		at Alabama	L 60–70	13–13 (4–10)	Coleman Coliseum (3,285); Tuscaloosa, AL
02/22/2018; 7:00 pm		at No. 2 Mississippi State	L 61–82	13–14 (4–11)	Humphrey Coliseum (9,474); Starkville, MS
02/25/2018; 1:00 pm, SECN		Ole Miss	W 60–55	14–14 (5–11)	Auburn Arena (3,111); Auburn, AL
SEC Women's Tournament
03/01/2018; 6:00 pm, SECN	(10)	vs. (7) Tennessee; Second Round	L 61–64	14–15	Bridgestone Arena (6,047); Nashville, TN
*Non-conference game. ^{#}Rankings from AP Poll. (#) Tournament seedings in parentheses. All times are in Central Time.

== Rankings ==
2017–18 NCAA Division I women's basketball rankings

Regular season polls
Poll	Pre- Season	Week 2	Week 3	Week 4	Week 5	Week 6	Week 7	Week 8	Week 9	Week 10	Week 11	Week 12	Week 13	Week 14	Week 15	Week 16	Week 17	Week 18	Week 19	Final
AP																				N/A
Coaches																				

Legend
	Increase in ranking
	Decrease in ranking
	No change
(RV)	Received votes
(NR)	Not ranked

== See also ==
- 2017–18 Auburn Tigers men's basketball team
