= 2017–18 Georgia Lady Bulldogs basketball team =

Intercollegiate basketball season

2017–18 Georgia Lady Bulldogs basketball

NCAA women's tournament, second round
- Conference: Southeastern Conference

Ranking
- Coaches: No. 19
- AP: No. 18
- Record: 26–7 (12–4 SEC)
- Head coach: Joni Taylor (3rd season)
- Assistant coaches: Karen Lange; Chelsea Newton; Robert Mosley
- Home arena: Stegeman Coliseum

2017–18 SEC women's basketball standings
	Conf.				Overall
Team	W		L	PCT	W		L	PCT
No. 4 Mississippi State	16	–	0	1.000	37	–	2	.949
No. 7 South Carolina †	12	–	4	.750	29	–	7	.806
No. 18 Georgia	12	–	4	.750	26	–	7	.788
No. 12 Tennessee	11	–	5	.688	25	–	8	.758
No. 17 Missouri	11	–	5	.688	24	–	8	.750
No. 14 Texas A&M	11	–	5	.688	26	–	10	.722
No. 24 LSU	11	–	5	.688	19	–	10	.655
Alabama	7	–	9	.438	20	–	14	.588
Kentucky	6	–	10	.375	15	–	17	.469
Auburn	5	–	11	.313	14	–	15	.483
Arkansas	3	–	13	.188	13	–	18	.419
Florida	3	–	13	.188	11	–	19	.367
Vanderbilt	3	–	13	.188	7	–	24	.226
Ole Miss	1	–	15	.063	12	–	19	.387
† 2018 SEC tournament winner As of April 1, 2018; Rankings from AP poll

The 2017–18 Georgia Lady Bulldogs women's basketball team represented University of Georgia in the 2017–18 NCAA Division I women's basketball season. The Lady Bulldogs, led by third-year head coach Joni Taylor, played their home games at Stegeman Coliseum as members of the Southeastern Conference. They finished the season 26–7, 12–4 in SEC play to finish in a tie for second place. They advanced to the semifinals of the SEC women's tournament where they lost to South Carolina. They received an at-large bid to the NCAA women's tournament where they defeated Mercer in the first round before losing to Duke in the second round.

== Roster ==
2017–18 Georgia Bulldogs women's basketball team
Players
Coaches

Pos.	#	Name	Height	Year	Previous school	Hometown
G	0	Taja Cole	5 ft 7 in (1.7 m)	RS So	Louisville	Richmond, VA
G	2	Gabby Connally	5 ft 6 in (1.68 m)	Fr	Brandeis HS	San Antonio, TX
F	3	Stephanie Paul	6 ft 1 in (1.85 m)	So	Community School of Naples	Naples, FL
F	4	Caliya Robinson	6 ft 3 in (1.91 m)	Jr	McEachern HS	Marietta, GA
G	11	Maya Caldwell	5 ft 11 in (1.8 m)	Fr	Davidson Day School	Charlotte, NC
G	12	Haley Clark	5 ft 9 in (1.75 m)	Sr	Edgewater HS	Orlando, FL
G	23	Que Morrison	5 ft 6 in (1.68 m)	Fr	McEachern HS	Riverdale, GA
G	24	Simone Costa	5 ft 10 in (1.78 m)	Sr	Independence CC	Lisbon, Portugal
G	25	Ari Henderson	5 ft 7 in (1.7 m)	Jr	Chamblee Charter HS	Chamblee, GA
F	33	Mackenzie Engram	6 ft 2 in (1.88 m)	Sr	Hillgrove HS	Powder Springs, GA
F	44	Malury Bates	6 ft 3 in (1.91 m)	Fr	William Fleming HS	Roanoke, VA
F	51	Bianca Blanaru	6 ft 5 in (1.96 m)	RS Jr	Washington State	Timișoara, Romania

Head coach

- Joni Taylor (Alabama)

Assistant coach(es)

- Karen Lange (Iowa)
- Chelsea Newton (Rutgers)
- Robert Mosley (Miles)

Legend

- (C) Team captain
- (S) Suspended
- (I) Ineligible
- (W) Walk-on
- Injured
- Current redshirt

Roster

== Schedule ==
Date time, TV	Rank^{#}	Opponent^{#}	Result	Record	Site (attendance) city, state
Non-conference regular season
11/12/2017*; 2:00 pm		Wofford	W 95-56	1-0	Stegeman Coliseum (3,292); Athens, GA
11/16/2017*; 7:00 pm, ACCN Extra		at Virginia	W 64–61	2–0	John Paul Jones Arena (3,170); Charlottesville, VA
11/19/2017*; 2:00 pm, ESPN3		at Mercer	W 72–54	3–0	Hawkins Arena (2,731); Macon, GA
11/21/2017*; 7:00 pm		Western Carolina	W 76–50	4–0	Stegeman Coliseum (2,194); Athens, GA
11/25/2017*; 4:00 pm, BYUtv		at BYU	W 79–63	5–0	Marriott Center (900); Provo, UT
11/27/2017*; 7:00 pm		Tennessee Tech	W 56–48	6–0	Stegeman Coliseum (2,115); Athens, GA
11/30/2017*; 7:00 pm		Furman	W 79–44	7–0	Stegeman Coliseum (2,084); Athens, GA
12/03/2017*; 4:00 pm, SECN		No. 2 Texas; Big 12/SEC Women's Challenge	L 53–81	7–1	Stegeman Coliseum (3,390); Athens, GA
12/14/2017*; 5:30 pm		at North Carolina A&T	W 73–63	8–1	Corbett Sports Center (450); Greensboro, NC
12/17/2017*; 1:00 pm, SECN		Georgia Tech	W 60–53	9–1	Stegeman Coliseum (4,290); Athens, GA
12/19/2017*; 11:00 am		Howard	W 87–47	10–1	Stegeman Coliseum (6,942); Athens, GA
12/21/2017*; 1:00 pm		Wright State	W 87–71	11–1	Stegeman Coliseum (2,137); Athens, GA
12/28/2017*; 2:00 pm		North Florida	W 75–37	12–1	Stegeman Coliseum (2,614); Athens, GA
SEC regular season
12/31/2017; 6:00 pm, SECN		No. 5 Mississippi State	L 62–86	12–2 (0–1)	Stegeman Coliseum (2,934); Athens, GA
01/04/2018; 8:00 pm		at Vanderbilt	W 81–52	13–2 (1–1)	Memorial Gymnasium (2,153); Nashville, TN
01/07/2018; 2:00 pm		at Kentucky	W 56–42	14–2 (2–1)	Memorial Coliseum (5,782); Lexington, KY
01/11/2018; 7:00 pm		Arkansas	W 78–65	15–2 (3–1)	Stegeman Coliseum (2,229); Athens, GA
01/14/2018; 3:00 pm, SECN		at No. 17 Texas A&M	W 92–84 ^{OT}	16–2 (4–1)	Reed Arena (4,702); College Station, TX
01/21/2018; 3:00 pm, SECN		Auburn	W 60–48	17–2 (5–1)	Stegeman Coliseum (5,012); Athens, GA
01/25/2018; 7:00 pm	No. 21	No. 11 Missouri	W 62–50	18–2 (6–1)	Stegeman Coliseum (2,668); Athens, GA
01/28/2018; 2:00 pm	No. 21	at Florida	W 66–57	19–2 (7–1)	O'Connell Center (1,701); Gainesville, FL
02/01/2018; 8:00 pm	No. 17	at LSU	L 60–71	19–3 (7–2)	Maravich Center (1,805); Baton Rouge, LA
02/04/2018; 2:00 pm	No. 17	Ole Miss	W 69–45	20–3 (8–2)	Stegeman Coliseum (4,700); Athens, GA
02/08/2018; 7:00 pm	No. 18	Vanderbilt	W 67–55	21–3 (9–2)	Stegeman Coliseum (3,490); Athens, GA
02/11/2018; 3:00 pm, SECN	No. 18	at No. 11 Tennessee	L 46–62	21–4 (9–3)	Thompson–Boling Arena (12,523); Knoxville, TN
02/15/2018; 7:00 pm	No. 20	No. 8 South Carolina	L 65–77	21–5 (9–4)	Stegeman Coliseum (4,072); Athens, GA
02/19/2018; 7:00 pm, SECN	No. 19	at Ole Miss	W 66–52	22–5 (10–4)	The Pavilion at Ole Miss (1,209); Oxford, MS
02/22/2018; 8:00 pm	No. 19	at Alabama	W 49–43 ^{OT}	23–5 (11–4)	Coleman Coliseum (2,103); Tuscaloosa, AL
02/25/2018; Noon, SECN	No. 19	Florida	W 63–43	24–5 (12–4)	Stegeman Coliseum (4,568); Athens, GA
SEC Women's Tournament
03/02/2018; 7:30 pm, SECN	(3) No. 19	vs. (6) No. 14 Missouri; Quarterfinals	W 55–44	25–5	Bridgestone Arena (7,489); Nashville, TN
03/03/2018; 7:30 pm, ESPNU	(3) No. 19	vs. (2) No. 8 South Carolina; Semifinals	L 49–71	25–6	Bridgestone Arena (8,819); Nashville, TN
NCAA Women's Tournament
03/17/2018*; 1:30 pm, ESPN2	(4 A) No. 18	(13 A) No. 25 Mercer; First Round	W 68–63	26–6	Stegeman Coliseum (3,457); Athens, GA
03/19/2018*; 6:30 pm, ESPN2	(4 A) No. 18	(5 A) No. 20 Duke; Second Round	L 40–66	26–7	Stegeman Coliseum (2,908); Athens, GA
*Non-conference game. ^{#}Rankings from AP Poll. (#) Tournament seedings in parentheses. A=Albany Region. All times are in Eastern Time.

== Rankings ==
Ranking movements Legend: ██ Increase in ranking ██ Decrease in ranking — = Not ranked RV = Received votes
	Week																			
Poll	Pre	1	2	3	4	5	6	7	8	9	10	11	12	13	14	15	16	17	18	Final
AP	—	—	RV	RV	—	—	—	—	—	—	RV	RV	21	17	18	20	19	19	18	Not released
Coaches	—	—^	—	RV	—	—	RV	—	—	RV	24	20	18	18	19	19	18	17	17	19

^Coaches' Poll did not release a second poll at the same time as the AP.

== See also ==
- 2017–18 Georgia Bulldogs basketball team
