= 2017–18 Vanderbilt Commodores women's basketball team =

Intercollegiate basketball season

2017–18 Vanderbilt Commodores women's basketball
- Conference: Southeastern Conference
- Record: 7–24 (3–13 SEC)
- Head coach: Stephanie White (2nd season)
- Assistant coaches: Carolyn Peck; Joy Cheek; Kelly Komara
- Home arena: Memorial Gymnasium

2017–18 SEC women's basketball standings
| | Conf. | | | | Overall |
| Team | W | | L | PCT | W | | L | PCT |
|---|---|---|---|---|---|---|---|---|
| No. 4 Mississippi State | 16 | – | 0 | 1.000 | 37 | – | 2 | .949 |
| No. 7 South Carolina † | 12 | – | 4 | .750 | 29 | – | 7 | .806 |
| No. 18 Georgia | 12 | – | 4 | .750 | 26 | – | 7 | .788 |
| No. 12 Tennessee | 11 | – | 5 | .688 | 25 | – | 8 | .758 |
| No. 17 Missouri | 11 | – | 5 | .688 | 24 | – | 8 | .750 |
| No. 14 Texas A&M | 11 | – | 5 | .688 | 26 | – | 10 | .722 |
| No. 24 LSU | 11 | – | 5 | .688 | 19 | – | 10 | .655 |
| Alabama | 7 | – | 9 | .438 | 20 | – | 14 | .588 |
| Kentucky | 6 | – | 10 | .375 | 15 | – | 17 | .469 |
| Auburn | 5 | – | 11 | .313 | 14 | – | 15 | .483 |
| Arkansas | 3 | – | 13 | .188 | 13 | – | 18 | .419 |
| Florida | 3 | – | 13 | .188 | 11 | – | 19 | .367 |
| Vanderbilt | 3 | – | 13 | .188 | 7 | – | 24 | .226 |
| Ole Miss | 1 | – | 15 | .063 | 12 | – | 19 | .387 |
† 2018 SEC tournament winner As of April 1, 2018; Rankings from AP poll

The 2017–18 Vanderbilt Commodores women's basketball team represented Vanderbilt University in the 2017–18 NCAA Division I women's basketball season. The Commodores, led by second-year head coach Stephanie White, played their home games at Memorial Gymnasium and were members of the Southeastern Conference. They finished the season 7–24, 3–13 in SEC play to finish in a three-way tie for eleventh place. They lost in the first round of the SEC women's tournament to Arkansas.

== Previous season ==
They finished the season 14–16, 4–12 in SEC play to finish in thirteenth place. They lost in the first round of the SEC women's tournament to Alabama.

== Roster ==
2017–18 Vanderbilt Commodores women's basketball team
Players
Coaches

| Pos. | # | Name | Height | Year | Previous school | Hometown |
|---|---|---|---|---|---|---|
| F | 0 | Kayla Overbeck | 6 ft 1 in (1.85 m) | So | Newbury Park | Newbury Park, CA |
| G | 2 | Chelsie Hall | 5 ft 7 in (1.7 m) | Fr | Seffner Christian | Boca Raton, FL |
| G | 3 | Rachel Bell | 5 ft 10 in (1.78 m) | Sr | Creek Wood | Cumberland Furnace, TN |
| G | 10 | Cierra Walker | 5 ft 8 in (1.73 m) | So | Oregon City | Oregon City, OR |
| G | 12 | Myka Dancy | 5 ft 9 in (1.75 m) | Sr | Antioch | Antioch, TN |
| G/F | 21 | Erin Whalen | 6 ft 1 in (1.85 m) | So | Providence Day School | Charlotte, NC |
| C | 22 | Bree Horrocks | 6 ft 5 in (1.96 m) | RS Jr | Buford; Purdue | Buford, GA |
| F | 24 | Autumn Newby | 6 ft 2 in (1.88 m) | Fr | Archer | Lawrenceville, GA |
| G | 30 | LeaLea Carter | 5 ft 11 in (1.8 m) | So | Dickson County | Dickson, TN |
| F/C | 31 | Blessing Ejiofor | 6 ft 5 in (1.96 m) | Fr | Eastside | Paterson, NJ |
| G | 33 | Christa Reed | 5 ft 11 in (1.8 m) | Sr | Bay | Bay St. Louis, MS |
| F | 34 | Mariella Fasoula | 6 ft 5 in (1.96 m) | RS So | American Community School of Athens; Boston College | Athens, Greece |
| G | 35 | Kaleigh Clemons-Green | 5 ft 7 in (1.7 m) | So | Baylor School | Chattanooga, TN |
| C | 41 | Paige Warren | 6 ft 4 in (1.93 m) | Fr | Dublin Coffman | Dublin, OH |

Head coach

- Stephanie White (Purdue)

Assistant coach(es)

- Carolyn Peck (Vanderbilt)
- Joy Cheek (Duke)
- Kelly Komara (Purdue)

Legend

- (C) Team captain
- (S) Suspended
- (I) Ineligible
- (W) Walk-on
- Injured
- Current redshirt

Roster
Last update: January 15, 2018

== Schedule ==
| Date time, TV | Rank^{#} | Opponent^{#} | Result | Record | Site (attendance) city, state |
Exhibition
| 10/29/2017*; 2:00 pm | | Marian | W 90–78 | | Memorial Gymnasium; Nashville, TN |
Non-conference regular season
| 11/10/2017*; 6:00 pm | | Middle Tennessee | L 54–65 | 0–1 | Memorial Gymnasium (2,866); Nashville, TN |
| 11/14/2017*; 6:00 pm | | at Central Michigan | L 72–92 | 0–2 | McGuirk Arena (1,500); Mount Pleasant, MI |
| 11/17/2017*; 12:00 pm | | at Tulane | L 59–71 | 0–3 | Devlin Fieldhouse (1,562); New Orleans, LA |
| 11/20/2017*; 12:00 pm | | Ball State | L 79–88 | 0–4 | Memorial Gymnasium (5,367); Nashville, TN |
| 11/23/2017*; 1:30 pm | | vs. George Washington; Paradise Jam Tournament Reef Division | W 69–59 | 1–4 | Charles E. Smith Center (707); Washington, D.C. |
| 11/24/2017*; 2:30 pm | | vs. Syracuse; Paradise Jam Tournament Reef Division | L 78–84 | 1–5 | Charles E. Smith Center (933); Washington, D.C. |
| 11/25/2017*; 11:00 am | | vs. Wisconsin; Paradise Jam Tournament Reef Division | L 71–73 ^{OT} | 1–6 | Charles E. Smith Center; Washington, D.C. |
| 11/29/2017*; 7:00 pm | | at Saint Louis | W 74–69 | 2–6 | Chaifetz Arena (1,687); St. Louis, MO |
| 12/02/2017*; 3:00 pm, SECN | | Iowa State; Big 12/SEC Women's Challenge | W 77–74 | 3–6 | Memorial Gymnasium; Nashville, TN |
| 12/07/2017*; 6:00 pm | | at No. 4 Louisville | L 57–79 | 3–7 | KFC Yum! Center (6,132); Louisville, KY |
| 12/16/2017*; 6:00 pm | | Memphis | L 60–71 | 3–8 | Memorial Gymnasium (2,495); Nashville, TN |
| 12/19/2017*; 5:00 pm | | NC State | L 72–83 | 3–9 | Memorial Gymnasium (2,292); Nashville, TN |
| 12/21/2017*; 12:00 pm | | Belmont | L 74–111 | 3–10 | Memorial Gymnasium; Nashville, TN |
| 12/28/2017*; 7:00 pm | | Lipscomb | W 92–82 | 4–10 | Memorial Gymnasium (2,330); Nashville, TN |
SEC regular season
| 12/31/2017; 3:00 pm, SECN | | at LSU | L 65–82 | 4–11 (0–1) | Maravich Center (2,020); Baton Rouge, LA |
| 01/04/2018; 7:00 pm | | Georgia | L 52–81 | 4–12 (0–2) | Memorial Gymnasium (2,153); Nashville, TN |
| 01/07/2018; 11:00 am | | at No. 7 Tennessee; Rivalry | L 73–86 | 4–13 (0–3) | Thompson–Boling Arena (2,153); Knoxville, TN |
| 01/11/2018; 7:00 pm | | No. 11 Missouri | L 70–81 | 4–14 (0–4) | Memorial Gymnasium (2,112); Nashville, TN |
| 01/15/2018; 7:00 pm, SECN | | Kentucky | W 70–55 | 5–14 (1–4) | Memorial Gymnasium (2,212); Nashville, TN |
| 01/18/2018; 7:00 pm | | No. 10 South Carolina | L 82–95 | 5–15 (1–5) | Memorial Gymnasium (2,231); Nashville, TN |
| 01/21/2018; 2:00 pm | | at Alabama | L 75–77 | 5–16 (1–6) | Coleman Coliseum (2,643); Tuscaloosa, AL |
| 01/28/2018; 2:00 pm, SECN | | No. 15 Texas A&M | L 67–91 | 5–17 (1–7) | Memorial Gymnasium (3,009); Nashville, TN |
| 02/01/2018; 6:00 pm | | at Ole Miss | W 75–72 | 6–17 (2–7) | The Pavilion at Ole Miss (1,279); Oxford, MS |
| 02/04/2018; 1:00 pm, ESPNU | | No. 12 Tennessee; Rivalry | L 64–74 | 6–18 (2–8) | Memorial Gymnasium (4,771); Nashville, TN |
| 02/08/2018; 8:00 pm | | at No. 18 Georgia | L 55–67 | 6–19 (2–9) | Stegeman Coliseum (3,490); Athens, GA |
| 02/12/2018; 6:00 pm, SECN | | Auburn | L 60–63 | 6–20 (2–10) | Memorial Gymnasium (1,758); Nashville, TN |
| 02/15/2018; 7:30 pm, SECN | | No. 2 Mississippi State | L 50–95 | 6–21 (2–11) | Memorial Gymnasium (2,876); Nashville, TN |
| 02/18/2018; 1:00 pm, SECN | | at Florida | L 71–88 | 6–22 (2–12) | O'Connell Center (2,007); Gainesville, FL |
| 02/22/2018; 7:00 pm | | at No. 11 Missouri | L 68–83 | 6–23 (2–13) | Mizzou Arena (4,123); Columbia, MO |
| 02/25/2018; 2:00 pm | | Arkansas | W 78–73 | 7–23 (3–13) | Memorial Gymnasium (4,160); Nashville, TN |
SEC Women's Tournament
| 02/28/2018; 11:00 am, SECN | (13) | vs. (12) Arkansas; First Round | L 76–88 | 7–24 | Bridgestone Arena; Nashville, TN |
*Non-conference game. ^{#}Rankings from AP Poll. (#) Tournament seedings in parentheses. All times are in Central Time.

== See also ==
- 2017–18 Vanderbilt Commodores men's basketball team
