= 2017–18 Alabama Crimson Tide women's basketball team =

Intercollegiate basketball season

2017–18 Alabama Crimson Tide women's basketball

WNIT, Quarterfinals
- Conference: Southeastern Conference
- Record: 20–14 (7–9 SEC)
- Head coach: Kristy Curry (5th season)
- Assistant coaches: Kelly Curry; Brooks Donald-Williams; Shereka Wright
- Home arena: Coleman Coliseum

2017–18 SEC women's basketball standings
	Conf.				Overall
Team	W		L	PCT	W		L	PCT
No. 4 Mississippi State	16	–	0	1.000	37	–	2	.949
No. 7 South Carolina †	12	–	4	.750	29	–	7	.806
No. 18 Georgia	12	–	4	.750	26	–	7	.788
No. 12 Tennessee	11	–	5	.688	25	–	8	.758
No. 17 Missouri	11	–	5	.688	24	–	8	.750
No. 14 Texas A&M	11	–	5	.688	26	–	10	.722
No. 24 LSU	11	–	5	.688	19	–	10	.655
Alabama	7	–	9	.438	20	–	14	.588
Kentucky	6	–	10	.375	15	–	17	.469
Auburn	5	–	11	.313	14	–	15	.483
Arkansas	3	–	13	.188	13	–	18	.419
Florida	3	–	13	.188	11	–	19	.367
Vanderbilt	3	–	13	.188	7	–	24	.226
Ole Miss	1	–	15	.063	12	–	19	.387
† 2018 SEC tournament winner As of April 1, 2018; Rankings from AP poll

The 2017–18 Alabama Crimson Tide women's basketball team represented the University of Alabama in the 2017–18 NCAA Division I women's basketball season. The Crimson Tide, led by fifth-year head coach Kristy Curry, played their games at Coleman Coliseum and were members of the Southeastern Conference. They finished the season 20–14, 7–9 in SEC play to finish in eighth place. They lost in the second round of the SEC women's tournament to Kentucky. They received an automatic bid to the Women's National Invitation Tournament defeat Southern, UCF and Georgia Tech in the first, second and third rounds before losing to Virginia Tech in the quarterfinals.

== Roster ==
2017–18 Alabama Crimson Tide women's basketball team
Players
Coaches

Pos.	#	Name	Height	Year	Previous school	Hometown
F	1	Quanetria Bolton	6 ft 0 in (1.83 m)	Sr	Anniston HS	Anniston, AL
G	2	Amber Richardson	6 ft 0 in (1.83 m)	Jr	Southeast Raleigh Magnet HS	Garner, NC
G	3	Jordan Lewis	5 ft 7 in (1.7 m)	So	Lake Highland Prep	Windermere, FL
G	5	Alana da Silva	5 ft 6 in (1.68 m)	Sr	New Mexico Junior College	São Paulo, Brazil
G	10	DaiJia Ruffin	5 ft 9 in (1.75 m)	Jr	Sacred Heart Academy; Tennessee–Martin	Lexington, KY
G	11	Hannah Cook	6 ft 0 in (1.83 m)	Sr	Ozark HS	Ozark, MO
G	13	Coco Knight	5 ft 7 in (1.7 m)	Sr	Baldwin County HS; Shelton State CC	Bay Minette, AL
G	15	Meoshonti Knight	5 ft 8 in (1.73 m)	Sr	Central Catholic HS	Morgan City, LA
F	20	Ashley Williams	6 ft 0 in (1.83 m)	Sr	Alcovy HS	Covington, GA
G	21	Taylor Berry	5 ft 9 in (1.75 m)	Jr	Mount Carmel Academy	New Orleans, LA
G	23	Shaquera Wade	6 ft 0 in (1.83 m)	Jr	Huntsville HS	Huntsville, AL
F	25	Ashley Knight	6 ft 5 in (1.96 m)	So	Lyndon B. Johnson HS	Austin, TX
F	26	Jasmine Walker	6 ft 3 in (1.91 m)	So	Jefferson Davis HS	Montgomery, AL

Head coach

- Kristy Curry (Louisiana–Monroe)

Assistant coach(es)

- Kelly Curry (Texas A&M)
- Brooks Donald-Williams (Mississippi State)
- Shereka Wright (Purdue)

Legend

- (C) Team captain
- (S) Suspended
- (I) Ineligible
- (W) Walk-on
- Injured
- Current redshirt

Roster

== Schedule ==
Date time, TV	Rank^{#}	Opponent^{#}	Result	Record	Site (attendance) city, state
Exhibition
11/01/2017*; 7:00 pm		Antelope Valley	W 108–53	–	Coleman Coliseum (1,811); Tuscaloosa, AL
Non-conference regular season
11/10/2017*; 7:00 pm		Alabama A&M	W 90–32	1–0	Coleman Coliseum (2,414); Tuscaloosa, AL
11/13/2017*; 7:00 pm		Utah	W 65–60	2–0	Coleman Coliseum (2,035); Tuscaloosa, AL
11/16/2017*; 11:30 am		Jacksonville	W 75–60	3–0	Coleman Coliseum (4,179); Tuscaloosa, AL
11/19/2017*; 1:00 pm		at Georgia Southern	W 84–36	4–0	Hanner Fieldhouse (458); Statesboro, GA
11/23/2017*; 1:30 pm		vs. NC State; Puerto Rico Clasico	L 49–68	4–1	Cardinal Gibbons Arena (57); Fort Lauderdale, FL
11/24/2017*; 4:00 pm		vs. Elon; Puerto Rico Clasico	L 55–60	4–2	Cardinal Gibbons Arena (87); Fort Lauderdale, FL
12/01/2017*; 12:00 pm, FSSW		at TCU; Big 12/SEC Women's Challenge	L 67–88	4–3	Schollmaier Arena (3,457); Fort Worth, TX
12/07/2017*; 6:30 pm, ESPN3		at Lipscomb	W 73–51	5–3	Allen Arena (216); Nashville, TN
12/10/2017*; 2:00 pm		Grambling State	W 73–49	6–3	Coleman Coliseum (2,009); Tuscaloosa, AL
12/17/2017*; 2:00 pm		SMU	W 59–44	7–3	Coleman Coliseum (2,229); Tuscaloosa, AL
12/19/2017*; 12:00 pm		Missouri State	W 65–61	8–3	Coleman Coliseum (1,971); Tuscaloosa, AL
12/20/2017*; 7:00 pm		Murray State	W 68–47	9–3	Coleman Coliseum (2,070); Tuscaloosa, AL
12/28/2017*; 7:00 pm		Florida A&M	W 91–55	10–3	Coleman Coliseum (2,410); Tuscaloosa, AL
SEC regular season
12/31/2017; 2:00 pm		No. 16 Missouri	L 56–62	10–4 (0–1)	Coleman Coliseum (1,370); Tuscaloosa, AL
01/04/2018; 6:00 pm		at Florida	W 63–54	11–4 (1–1)	O'Connell Center (1,305); Gainesville, FL
01/07/2018; 3:00 pm, SECN		at Arkansas	W 83–76	12–4 (2–1)	Bud Walton Arena (2,001); Fayetteville, AR
01/11/2018; 7:00 pm		LSU	W 65–51	13–4 (3–1)	Coleman Coliseum (2,323); Tuscaloosa, AL
01/14/2018; 3:00 pm, ESPNU		at No. 4 Mississippi State	L 61–75	13–5 (3–2)	Humphrey Coliseum (9,010); Starkville, MS
01/18/2018; 7:00 pm		No. 16 Texas A&M	L 54–73	13–6 (3–3)	Coleman Coliseum (2,117); Tuscaloosa, AL
01/21/2018; 2:00 pm		Vanderbilt	W 77–75	14–6 (4–3)	Coleman Coliseum (2,643); Tuscaloosa, AL
01/25/2018; 6:00 pm		at Kentucky	L 54–79	14–7 (4–4)	Memorial Coliseum (4,957); Lexington, KY
01/28/2018; 4:00 pm, SECN		at Auburn	L 60–69	14–8 (4–5)	Auburn Arena (3,357); Auburn, AL
02/04/2018; 1:00 pm, SECN		Arkansas	L 66–74	14–9 (4–6)	Coleman Coliseum (2,265); Tuscaloosa, AL
02/08/2018; 6:00 pm, SECN		No. 7 South Carolina	L 66–79	14–10 (4–7)	Coleman Coliseum (2,313); Tuscaloosa, AL
02/11/2018; 2:00 pm		at Ole Miss	W 82–79	15–10 (5–7)	The Pavilion at Ole Miss (1,641); Oxford, MS
02/15/2018; 5:30 pm, SECN		at No. 11 Tennessee	W 72–63	16–10 (6–7)	Thompson–Boling Arena (8,432); Knoxville, TN
02/18/2018; 4:00 pm, SECN		Auburn	W 70–60	17–10 (7–7)	Coleman Coliseum (3,285); Tuscaloosa, AL
02/22/2018; 7:00 pm		No. 19 Georgia	L 43–49 ^{OT}	17–11 (7–8)	Coleman Coliseum (2,103); Tuscaloosa, AL
02/25/2018; 2:00 pm		at No. 24 LSU	L 78–79 ^{OT}	17–12 (7–9)	Pete Maravich Assembly Center (3,016); Baton Rouge, LA
SEC Women's Tournament
03/01/2018; 12:00 pm, SECN	(8)	vs. (9) Kentucky; Second Round	L 64–71	17–13	Bridgestone Arena; Nashville, TN
Women's National Invitation Tournament
03/14/2018*; 7:00 pm		Southern; First Round	W 69–56	18–13	Coleman Coliseum (294); Tuscaloosa, AL
03/18/2018*; 2:00 pm		UCF; Second Round	W 80–61	19–13	Coleman Coliseum (321); Tuscaloosa, AL
03/22/2018*; 7:00 pm		Georgia Tech; Third Round	W 61–59	20–13	Coleman Coliseum (640); Tuscaloosa, AL
03/25/2018*; 1:00 pm, ACCN Extra		at Virginia Tech; Quarterfinals	L 67–74	20–14	Cassell Coliseum (1,067); Blacksburg, VA
*Non-conference game. ^{#}Rankings from AP Poll. (#) Tournament seedings in parentheses. All times are in CST.

== Rankings ==
2017–18 NCAA Division I women's basketball rankings

Regular season polls
Poll	Pre- Season	Week 2	Week 3	Week 4	Week 5	Week 6	Week 7	Week 8	Week 9	Week 10	Week 11	Week 12	Week 13	Week 14	Week 15	Week 16	Week 17	Week 18	Week 19	Final
AP	NR	NR	NR	NR	NR	NR	NR	NR	NR	NR	NR	NR	NR	NR	NR	NR	NR	NR		N/A
Coaches	NR	N/A	NR	NR	NR	NR	NR	NR	NR	NR	NR	NR	NR	NR	NR	RV	NR	NR		

Legend
	Increase in ranking
	Decrease in ranking
	Not ranked previous week
(RV)	Received Votes

== See also ==
- 2017–18 Alabama Crimson Tide men's basketball team
