= 2017–18 Arkansas Razorbacks women's basketball team =

Intercollegiate basketball season

2017–18 Arkansas Razorbacks women's basketball
- Conference: Southeastern Conference
- Record: 13–18 (3–13 SEC)
- Head coach: Mike Neighbors (1st season)
- Assistant coaches: Lacey Goldwire; Todd Schaefer; Pauline Love
- Home arena: Bud Walton Arena

2017–18 SEC women's basketball standings
	Conf.				Overall
Team	W		L	PCT	W		L	PCT
No. 4 Mississippi State	16	–	0	1.000	37	–	2	.949
No. 7 South Carolina †	12	–	4	.750	29	–	7	.806
No. 18 Georgia	12	–	4	.750	26	–	7	.788
No. 12 Tennessee	11	–	5	.688	25	–	8	.758
No. 17 Missouri	11	–	5	.688	24	–	8	.750
No. 14 Texas A&M	11	–	5	.688	26	–	10	.722
No. 24 LSU	11	–	5	.688	19	–	10	.655
Alabama	7	–	9	.438	20	–	14	.588
Kentucky	6	–	10	.375	15	–	17	.469
Auburn	5	–	11	.313	14	–	15	.483
Arkansas	3	–	13	.188	13	–	18	.419
Florida	3	–	13	.188	11	–	19	.367
Vanderbilt	3	–	13	.188	7	–	24	.226
Ole Miss	1	–	15	.063	12	–	19	.387
† 2018 SEC tournament winner As of April 1, 2018; Rankings from AP poll

The 2017–18 Arkansas Razorbacks women's basketball team represented the University of Arkansas in the 2017-18 NCAA Division I women's basketball season. They were led by new coach and Arkansas native Mike Neighbors, who was hired from Washington after former coach Jimmy Dykes resigned after three seasons. They finished the season 13–18, 3–13 in SEC play to finish in a 3 way for eleventh place. They advanced to the second round of the SEC women's tournament where they lost to Texas A&M.

== Roster ==
2017–18 Arkansas Razorbacks women's basketball team
Players
Coaches

Pos.	#	Name	Height	Year	Previous school	Hometown
G	0	A'Tyanna Gaulden (redshirt)	5 ft 7 in (1.7 m)	So	Americus Sumter HS; Florida State	Ocilla, GA
G	1	Raven Northcross-Baker	5 ft 7 in (1.7 m)	Jr	Malvern High School; Chipola College	Malvern, AR
G	3	Malica Monk	5 ft 5 in (1.65 m)	Jr	North Little Rock HS	North Little Rock, AR
G/F	4	Keiryn Swenson	6 ft 1 in (1.85 m)	Jr	Maize HS	Wichita, KS
F/C	10	Kiara Williams	6 ft 1 in (1.85 m)	So	Little Rock Central HS	Little Rock, AR
G	13	Grayce Spangler	5 ft 11 in (1.8 m)	Fr	Fayetteville High School	Fayetteville, AR
G	14	Jailyn Mason	5 ft 9 in (1.75 m)	So	William Mason HS	Mason, OH
F	20	Sydney Stout	6 ft 0 in (1.83 m)	So	Bixby HS	Bixby, OK
G	21	Devin Cosper	5 ft 10 in (1.78 m)	Sr	Field Kindley HS; Coffeyville CC	Coffeyville, KS
G/F	22	Bailey Zimmerman	6 ft 0 in (1.83 m)	Jr	Wonderview HS	Hattieville, AR
F	24	Taylah Thomas	6 ft 1 in (1.85 m)	Fr	Mansfield Timberview High School	Arlington, TX
F	30	Macy Weaver	6 ft 3 in (1.91 m)	Fr	Stillman Valley HS	Davis Junction, IL
G	33	Chelsea Dungee (redshirt)	5 ft 11 in (1.8 m)	So	Sapulpa High School; Oklahoma	Sapulpa, OK

Head coach

- Mike Neighbors (Arkansas)

Assistant coach(es)

- Lacey Goldwire (Oklahoma State)
- Todd Schaefer (Thomas More)
- Pauline Love (Southern Miss)

Legend

- (C) Team captain
- (S) Suspended
- (I) Ineligible
- (W) Walk-on
- Injured
- Current redshirt

Roster

== Schedule ==
Date time, TV	Rank^{#}	Opponent^{#}	Result	Record	Site (attendance) city, state
Exhibition
November 2*; 7:00 pm		Northeastern State	W 82–74		Bud Walton Arena (1,200); Fayetteville, AR
Non-conference regular season
November 10*; 10:30 am		Sam Houston State	W 65–54	1–0	Bud Walton Arena (4,719); Fayetteville, AR
November 12*; 1:00 pm		Samford	W 84–63	2–0	Bud Walton Arena (1,739); Fayetteville, AR
November 16*; 8:00 pm, BTN		at Nebraska	L 69–80	2–1	Pinnacle Bank Arena (3,459); Lincoln, NE
November 20*; 7:00 pm, CST		at Oral Roberts	W 77–66	3–1	Mabee Center (2,503); Tulsa, OK
November 24*; 3:30 pm		at UTEP; UTEP Classic	L 61–64	3–2	Don Haskins Center (633); El Paso, TX
November 25*; 1:00 pm		vs. New Mexico State; UTEP Classic	W 69–60	4–2	Don Haskins Center (250); El Paso, TX
November 29*; 7:00 pm		Abilene Christian	W 79–65	5–2	Bud Walton Arena (1,132); Fayetteville, AR
December 3*; 2:00 pm, ESPN3		at Kansas; Big 12/SEC Women's Challenge	L 60–71	5–3	Allen Fieldhouse (1,795); Lawrence, KS
December 7*; 7:00 pm		Charlotte	W 73–72	6–3	Bud Walton Arena (1,139); Fayetteville, AR
December 10*; 2:00 pm		Tulsa	W 67–41	7–3	Bud Walton Arena (1,821); Fayetteville, AR
December 17*; 2:00 pm		UT Arlington	W 91–57	8–3	Bud Walton Arena (1,481); Fayetteville, AR
December 21*; 3:00 pm, P12N		at Arizona State	L 43–89	8–4	Wells Fargo Arena (1,988); Tempe, AZ
December 28*; 7:00 pm		Grambling State	W 79–62	9–4	Bud Walton Arena (1,388); Fayetteville, AR
SEC regular season
December 31; 2:00 pm		Ole Miss	W 73–72	10–4 (1–0)	Bud Walton Arena (1,701); Fayetteville, AR
January 4; 8:00 pm, SECN		at No. 5 Mississippi State	L 69–111	10–5 (1–1)	Humphrey Coliseum (5,398); Starkville, MS
January 7; 3:00 pm, SECN		Alabama	L 76–83	10–6 (1–2)	Bud Walton Arena (2,001); Fayetteville, AR
January 11; 6:00 pm		at Georgia	L 65–78	10–7 (1–3)	Stegeman Coliseum (2,229); Athens, GA
January 14; 4:00 pm, SECN		at Auburn	W 68–58	11–7 (2–3)	Auburn Arena (2,210); Auburn, AL
January 18; 6:00 pm, SECN		Florida	L 51–65	11–8 (2–4)	Bud Walton Arena (1,288); Fayetteville, AR
January 21; 4:00 pm, SECN		at No. 11 Missouri	L 54–88	11–9 (2–5)	Mizzou Arena (5,219); Columbia, MO
January 25; 5:30 pm, SECN		at No. 9 South Carolina	L 42–90	11–10 (2–6)	Colonial Life Arena (12,844); Columbia, SC
January 29; 6:00 pm, SECN		Kentucky	L 65–76	11–11 (2–7)	Bud Walton Arena (1,313); Fayetteville, AR
February 4; 1:00 pm, SECN		at Alabama	W 74–66	12–11 (3–7)	Coleman Coliseum (2,265); Tuscaloosa, AL
February 8; 7:00 pm		No. 11 Tennessee	L 85–90	12–12 (3–8)	Bud Walton Arena (1,446); Fayetteville, AR
February 11; 4:00 pm, SECN		No. 15 Missouri; Postponed (travel conditions), Rescheduled for February 12, 2018			Bud Walton Arena; Fayetteville, AR
February 12; 6:00 pm		Missouri	L 58–84	12–13 (3–9)	Bud Walton Arena (1,766); Fayetteville, AR
February 15; 6:00 pm		at Kentucky	L 57–78	12–14 (3–10)	Memorial Coliseum (5,306); Lexington, KY
February 18; 2:00 pm		LSU	L 57–62	12–15 (3–11)	Bud Walton Arena (2,485); Fayetteville, AR
February 22; 7:00 pm		Texas A&M	L 60–104	12–16 (3–12)	Bud Walton Arena (1,375); Fayetteville, AR
February 25; 2:00 pm		at Vanderbilt	L 73–78	12–17 (3–13)	Memorial Gymnasium (4,160); Nashville, TN
SEC Women's Tournament
02/28/2018; 11:00 am, SECN	(13)	vs. (12) Vanderbilt; First Round	W 88–76	13–17	Bridgestone Arena (4,371); Nashville, TN
03/01/2018; 2:30 pm, SECN	(13)	vs. (5) No. 15 Texas A&M; Second Round	L 52–82	13–18	Bridgestone Arena (3,889); Nashville, TN
*Non-conference game. ^{#}Rankings from AP Polls. (#) Tournament seedings in parentheses. All times are in Central Time.

== See also ==
- 2017–18 Arkansas Razorbacks men's basketball team
