= 2017–18 LSU Lady Tigers basketball team =

Intercollegiate basketball season

2017–18 LSU Lady Tigers basketball

NCAA Women's Tournament, first round
- Conference: Southeastern Conference

Ranking
- AP: No. 24
- Record: 19–10 (11–5 SEC)
- Head coach: Nikki Fargas (7th season)
- Assistant coaches: Tasha Butts; Mickie DeMoss; Charlene Thomas-Swinson
- Home arena: Pete Maravich Assembly Center

2017–18 SEC women's basketball standings
	Conf.				Overall
Team	W		L	PCT	W		L	PCT
No. 4 Mississippi State	16	–	0	1.000	37	–	2	.949
No. 7 South Carolina †	12	–	4	.750	29	–	7	.806
No. 18 Georgia	12	–	4	.750	26	–	7	.788
No. 12 Tennessee	11	–	5	.688	25	–	8	.758
No. 17 Missouri	11	–	5	.688	24	–	8	.750
No. 14 Texas A&M	11	–	5	.688	26	–	10	.722
No. 24 LSU	11	–	5	.688	19	–	10	.655
Alabama	7	–	9	.438	20	–	14	.588
Kentucky	6	–	10	.375	15	–	17	.469
Auburn	5	–	11	.313	14	–	15	.483
Arkansas	3	–	13	.188	13	–	18	.419
Florida	3	–	13	.188	11	–	19	.367
Vanderbilt	3	–	13	.188	7	–	24	.226
Ole Miss	1	–	15	.063	12	–	19	.387
† 2018 SEC tournament winner As of April 1, 2018; Rankings from AP poll

The 2017–18 LSU Lady Tigers basketball team represented Louisiana State University during the 2017–18 NCAA Division I women's basketball season college basketball season. The Lady Tigers, led by seventh-year head coach Nikki Fargas, will played their home games at Pete Maravich Assembly Center and were members of the Southeastern Conference. They finished the season 19–10, 11–5 in SEC play to finish in a 4 way tie for fourth place. As a 4th seed, they lost in the quarterfinals of the SEC women's tournament to Texas A&M. They received an at-large bid to the NCAA women's tournament, where they were upset by Central Michigan in the first round.

== Roster ==
2017–18 LSU Tigers women's basketball team
Players
Coaches

Pos.	#	Name	Height	Year	Previous school	Hometown
G	0	Chloe Jackson	5 ft 9 in (1.75 m)	RS Jr	Riverdale Baptist; NC State	Upper Marlboro, MD
G	2	Shanice Norton	5 ft 8 in (1.73 m)	Jr	Potter's House Christian Academy	London, England
G	3	Khayla Pointer	5 ft 7 in (1.7 m)	Fr	Holy Innocents' Episcopal	Kennesaw, GA
F	4	Raven Farley	6 ft 4 in (1.93 m)	Fr	Queen of Peace HS	Elizabeth, NJ
F	5	Ayana Mitchell	6 ft 2 in (1.88 m)	So	Salem HS	Conyers, GA
G	10	Dekeriya Patterson	5 ft 9 in (1.75 m)	Fr	Dunbar HS	Lehigh Acres, FL
G	11	Raigyne Moncrief	5 ft 10 in (1.78 m)	Sr	American Heritage HS	Fort Lauderdale, FL
G	13	Jaelyn Richard-Harris	5 ft 4 in (1.63 m)	So	Dekaney HS	Houston, TX
C	15	Yasmine Bidikuindila	6 ft 6 in (1.98 m)	So	Champlain College	Montreal, QE
C	24	Faustine Aifuwa	6 ft 5 in (1.96 m)	RS Fr	Dacula HS	Dacula, GA
G	25	Rakell Spencer	5 ft 11 in (1.8 m)	So	Cabrini HS; Texas A&M	New Orleans, LA
G	30	Jailin Cherry	5 ft 9 in (1.75 m)	Fr	Pascagoula HS	Pascagoula, MS
F	44	Tatum Neubert	6 ft 2 in (1.88 m)	RS Jr	Elizabeth HS; Oregon	Elizabeth, CO

Head coach

- Nikki Fargas (Tennessee)

Assistant coach(es)

- Tasha Butts (Tennessee)
- Mickie DeMoss (Louisiana Tech)
- Charlene Thomas-Swinson (Auburn)

Legend

- (C) Team captain
- (S) Suspended
- (I) Ineligible
- (W) Walk-on
- Injured
- Current redshirt

Roster

== Schedule and results ==
Date time, TV	Rank^{#}	Opponent^{#}	Result	Record	Site (attendance) city, state
Exhibition
11/05/2017*; 2:00 pm		Mississippi College	W 96–34		Maravich Center (603); Baton Rouge, LA
Non-conference regular season
11/10/2017*; 4:30 pm, CST		at No. 23 South Florida	L 55–61	0–1	USF Sun Dome (4,192); Tampa, FL
11/12/2017*; 2:00 pm		Southeastern Louisiana	W 84–56	1–1	Maravich Center (2,353); Baton Rouge, LA
11/15/2017*; 8:00 pm		at Northern Colorado	L 50–58	1–2	Bank of Colorado Arena (1,180); Greeley, CO
11/21/2017*; 7:00 pm		Nicholls State	W 65–50	2–2	Maravich Center (1,665); Baton Rouge, LA
11/24/2017*; 5:30 pm		vs. No. 2 Texas; South Point Thanksgiving Shootout	L 66–75	2–3	South Point Arena; Enterprise, NV
11/25/2017*; 10:00 pm		vs. Saint Louis; South Point Thanksgiving Shootout	W 71–59	3–3	South Point Arena; Enterprise, NV
11/30/2017*; 6:30 pm, FSSW+		at Texas Tech; Big 12/SEC Women's Challenge	W 48–40	4–3	United Supermarkets Arena (4,303); Lubbock, TX
12/10/2017*; 2:00 pm, CST		at Tulane	W 73–50	5–3	Fogleman Arena (1,242); New Orleans, LA
12/17/2017*; 2:00 pm		Louisiana	W 60–45	6–3	Maravich Center (2,011); Baton Rouge, LA
12/20/2017*; 6:30 pm, CST		at Little Rock	W 56–37	7–3	Jack Stephens Center (1,724); Little Rock, AR
12/27/2017*; 6:30 pm		Sam Houston State	W 71–58	8–3	Maravich Center (1,746); Baton Rouge, LA
SEC regular season
12/31/2017; 3:00 pm, SECN		Vanderbilt	W 85–65	9–3 (1–0)	Maravich Center (2,020); Baton Rouge, LA
01/04/2018; 7:00 pm		at No. 16 Missouri	W 69–65	10–3 (2–0)	Mizzou Arena (3,253); Columbia, MO
01/07/2018; 1:00 pm, SECN		No. 5 Mississippi State	L 70–83	10–4 (2–1)	Maravich Center (2,525); Baton Rouge, LA
01/11/2018; 7:00 pm		at Alabama	L 51–65	10–5 (2–2)	Coleman Coliseum (2,323); Tuscaloosa, AL
01/14/2018; 12:00 pm, SECN		at Florida	W 66–59	11–5 (3–2)	O'Connell Center (1,332); Gainesville, FL
01/18/2018; 7:00 pm		Auburn	W 59–56	12–5 (4–2)	Maravich Center (1,765); Baton Rouge, LA
01/22/2018; 6:00 pm, SECN		at No. 15 Texas A&M	L 59–69	12–6 (4–3)	Reed Arena (3,506); College Station, TX
01/28/2018; 12:00 pm, SECN		No. 10 Tennessee	W 70–59	13–6 (5–3)	Maravich Center (4,333); Baton Rouge, LA
02/01/2018; 7:00 pm		No. 17 Georgia	W 71–60	14–6 (6–3)	Maravich Center (1,805); Baton Rouge, LA
02/04/2018; 11:00 am, SECN		at Kentucky	W 72–70	15–6 (7–3)	Rupp Arena (4,521); Lexington, KY
02/08/2018; 6:00 pm		at Auburn	L 62–70	15–7 (7–4)	Auburn Arena (1,916); Auburn, AL
02/11/2018; 2:00 pm		No. 14 Texas A&M	W 80–78	16–7 (8–4)	Maravich Center (2,013); Baton Rouge, LA
02/15/2018; 7:00 pm		Ole Miss	W 84–55	17–7 (9–4)	Maravich Center (1,759); Baton Rouge, LA
02/18/2018; 2:00 pm		at Arkansas	W 62–57	18–7 (10–4)	Bud Walton Arena (2,485); Fayetteville, AR
02/22/2018; 5:30 pm, SECN	No. 24	at No. 7 South Carolina	L 48–57	18–8 (10–5)	Colonial Life Arena (12,385); Columbia, SC
02/25/2018; 2:00 pm	No. 24	Alabama	W 79–78 ^{OT}	19–8 (11–5)	Maravich Center (3,016); Baton Rouge, LA
SEC Women's Tournament
03/02/2018; 2:30 pm, SECN	(4) No. 24	vs. (5) No. 15 Texas A&M; Quarterfinals	L 69–75	19–9	Bridgestone Arena (6,344); Nashville, TN
NCAA Women's Tournament
03/17/2018*; 10:00 am, ESPN2	(6 S) No. 24	vs. (11 S) Central Michigan; First Round	L 69–78	19–10	St. John Arena; Columbus, OH
*Non-conference game. ^{#}Rankings from AP Poll. (#) Tournament seedings in parentheses. S=Spokane Region. All times are in Central Time.

== Rankings ==
2017–18 NCAA Division I women's basketball rankings

Regular season polls
Poll	Pre- Season	Week 2	Week 3	Week 4	Week 5	Week 6	Week 7	Week 8	Week 9	Week 10	Week 11	Week 12	Week 13	Week 14	Week 15	Week 16	Week 17	Week 18	Week 19	Final
AP	RV	NR	NR	NR	NR	NR	NR	NR	NR	RV	NR	NR	RV	RV	RV	24	24	24	24	N/A
Coaches	RV	N/A	NR	NR	NR	NR	NR	NR	NR	NR	NR	NR	NR	RV	RV	RV	RV	RV	RV	RV

Legend
	Increase in ranking
	Decrease in ranking
	Not ranked previous week
(RV)	Received Votes
