= 2017–18 Florida Gators women's basketball team =

Intercollegiate basketball season

2017–18 Florida Gators women's basketball

Savannah Invitational Champions
- Conference: Southeastern Conference
- Record: 11–19 (3–13 SEC)
- Head coach: Cameron Newbauer (1st season)
- Assistant coaches: Kelly Rae Finley; Laura Harper; John McCray
- Home arena: O'Connell Center

2017–18 SEC women's basketball standings
	Conf.				Overall
Team	W		L	PCT	W		L	PCT
No. 4 Mississippi State	16	–	0	1.000	37	–	2	.949
No. 7 South Carolina †	12	–	4	.750	29	–	7	.806
No. 18 Georgia	12	–	4	.750	26	–	7	.788
No. 12 Tennessee	11	–	5	.688	25	–	8	.758
No. 17 Missouri	11	–	5	.688	24	–	8	.750
No. 14 Texas A&M	11	–	5	.688	26	–	10	.722
No. 24 LSU	11	–	5	.688	19	–	10	.655
Alabama	7	–	9	.438	20	–	14	.588
Kentucky	6	–	10	.375	15	–	17	.469
Auburn	5	–	11	.313	14	–	15	.483
Arkansas	3	–	13	.188	13	–	18	.419
Florida	3	–	13	.188	11	–	19	.367
Vanderbilt	3	–	13	.188	7	–	24	.226
Ole Miss	1	–	15	.063	12	–	19	.387
† 2018 SEC tournament winner As of April 1, 2018; Rankings from AP poll

The 2017–18 Florida Gators women's basketball team represented the University of Florida in the sport of basketball during the 2017–18 NCAA Division I women's basketball season. The Gators competed in Division I of the National Collegiate Athletic Association (NCAA) and the Southeastern Conference (SEC). The Gators, led by first-year head coach Cameron Newbauer, played their home games in the O'Connell Center on the university's Gainesville, Florida campus. They finished the season 11–19, 3–13 in SEC play to finish in a 3 tie for eleventh place. They lost in the first round of the SEC women's tournament to Ole Miss.

== Previous season ==
The Gators finished the season 15–16, 5–11 in SEC play to finish in a tie for eleventh place. They advanced to the second round of SEC women's tournament where they lost to Texas A&M.

On March 6, the school fired Amanda Butler. She finished at Florida with a 10-year record of 190–136.

== Roster ==
2017–18 Florida Gators women's basketball team
Players
Coaches

Pos.	#	Name	Height	Year	Hometown
G	1	Delicia Washington	5 ft 10 in (1.78 m)	So	Glen St. Mary, Florida
G	1	Tameria Johnson	6 ft 6 in (1.98 m)	Fr	Ocala, Florida
G	3	Funda Nakkaşoğlu	5 ft 8 in (1.73 m)	RS Jr	Hampton, Australia
G	4	Corey Staples (W)	5 ft 8 in (1.73 m)	Jr	Buford, Georgia
G	5	Elif Portakal	5 ft 9 in (1.75 m)	So	Istanbul, Turkey
G	11	Dyandria Anderson	5 ft 10 in (1.78 m)	Sr	Viera, Florida
F	12	Paulina Hersler	6 ft 3 in (1.91 m)	RS Sr	Malmö, Sweden
F	12	Zada Williams (redshirt)	6 ft 2 in (1.88 m)	Jr	Babson Park, Florida
G	15	Sydney Searcy	5 ft 7 in (1.7 m)	So	Ponte Vedra Beach, Florida
G	20	Simone Westbrook	5 ft 8 in (1.73 m)	RS Sr	Chandler, Arizona
G/F	22	Sydney Morang	5 ft 10 in (1.78 m)	So	New Providence, New Jersey
F	23	Jalaysha Thomas	6 ft 2 in (1.88 m)	Fr	Ocala, Florida
F	24	Mikayla Hayes	6 ft 2 in (1.88 m)	Fr	Brooklyn Park, Minnesota
F	44	Haley Lorenzen	6 ft 3 in (1.91 m)	Sr	Iowa City, Iowa

Head coach

- Cameron Newbauer (1st year)

Assistant coach(es)

- Kelly Rae Finley (1st year)
- Laura Harper (1st year)
- John McCray (1st year)

Legend

- (C) Team captain
- (S) Suspended
- (I) Ineligible
- (W) Walk-on
- Injured
- Current redshirt

Roster
Last update: 2017-09-10

=== Coaches ===
Name	Position	College	Graduating year
Cameron Newbauer	Head coach	IUPUI	2001
Kelly Rae Finley	Assistant coach	Colorado State	2003
Laura Harper	Assistant coach	Maryland	2000
John McCray	Assistant coach	Ohio State	1998
Serena Wilson	Director of basketball operations	Florida	2008
Scott Schmelzer	Director of Scouting and Video Operations	Butler	2013
Jessica Mateer	Athletic Trainer	Olivet Nazarene	2009
Justin McClelland	Strength & Conditioning Coordinator	Eastern (PA)	2011
Christine Clark	Recruiting Specialist	Harvard	2014
Lani McQuade	Executive assistant	Holy Names	1991
Allison Sanders	Graduate Assistant	Southeastern (FL)	2016
Cameron Kinzer	Coordinator of Basketball Technology	Florida	2017

== Schedule and results ==
Date time, TV	Rank^{#}	Opponent^{#}	Result	Record	Site (attendance) city, state
Non-conference regular season
11/11/2017*; 1:00 pm		Georgia State	W 82–66	1–0	O'Connell Center (1,509); Gainesville, FL
11/14/2017*; 7:00 pm		Arkansas State	L 69–70	1–1	O'Connell Center (1,143); Gainesville, FL
11/17/2017*; 7:00 pm		No. 17 Florida State	L 54–84	1–2	O'Connell Center (2,989); Gainesville, FL
11/21/2017*; 4:30 pm		vs. Richmond; Savannah Invitational	W 87–80	2–2	Savannah Civic Center (332); Savannah, GA
11/22/2017*; 7:00 pm		vs. Stetson; Savannah Invitational	L 71–85	2–3	Savannah Civic Center (578); Savannah, GA
11/23/2017*; 7:00 pm		vs. Savannah State; Savannah Invitational	W 90–40	3–3	Savannah Civic Center (364); Savannah, GA
11/28/2017*; 7:00 pm		Jacksonville	W 69–59	4–3	O'Connell Center (1,009); Gainesville, FL
12/03/2017*; 3:00 pm, FSSUN		at Oklahoma; Big 12/SEC Women's Challenge	W 80–61	5–3	Lloyd Noble Center (2,992); Norman, OK
12/06/2017*; 5:30 pm		No. 12 Ohio State	L 77–103	5–4	O'Connell Center (1,512); Gainesville, FL
12/10/2017*; 1:00 pm, SECN		Marshall	W 74–69	6–4	O'Connell Center (1,008); Gainesville, FL
12/20/2017*; 12:00 pm		Chattanooga; Gator Holiday Classic	L 60–65	6–5	O'Connell Center (1,054); Gainesville, FL
12/21/2017*; 12:00 pm		Saint Joseph's; Gator Holiday Classic	W 71–51	7–5	O'Connell Center (1,008); Gainesville, FL
12/27/2017*; 2:00 pm		Delaware State	W 85–51	8–5	O'Connell Center (1,206); Gainesville, FL
SEC regular season
12/31/2017; 4:00 pm, ESPN2		at Auburn	L 55–84	8–6 (0–1)	Auburn Arena (1,788); Auburn, AL
01/04/2018; 7:00 pm		Alabama	L 54–63	8–7 (0–2)	O'Connell Center (1,305); Gainesville, FL
01/07/2018; 3:00 pm		at Ole Miss	L 75–78 ^{2OT}	8–8 (0–3)	The Pavilion at Ole Miss (1,323); Oxford, MS
01/11/2018; 7:00 pm		Kentucky	L 53–56	8–9 (0–4)	O'Connell Center (1,509); Gainesville, FL
01/14/2018; 1:00 pm, SECN		LSU	L 59–66	8–10 (0–5)	O'Connell Center (1,332); Gainesville, FL
01/18/2018; 7:00 pm, SECN		at Arkansas	W 65–51	9–10 (1–5)	Bud Walton Arena (1,288); Fayetteville, AR
01/21/2018; 1:00 pm, SECN		Ole Miss	W 61–60	10–10 (2–5)	O'Connell Center (2,601); Gainesville, FL
01/25/2018; 8:30 pm, SECN		at No. 2 Mississippi State	L 53–90	10–11 (2–6)	Humphrey Coliseum (6,727); Starkville, MS
01/28/2018; 2:00 pm		No. 21 Georgia	L 57–66	10–12 (2–7)	O'Connell Center (1,701); Gainesville, FL
02/05/2018; 7:00 pm, SECN		at No. 15 Missouri	L 64–66	10–13 (2–8)	Mizzou Arena (3,164); Columbia, MO
02/08/2018; 7:00 pm		No. 2 Mississippi State	L 50–98	10–14 (2–9)	O'Connell Center (1,503); Gainesville, FL
02/11/2018; 1:00 pm, SECN		at No. 7 South Carolina	L 57–64	10–15 (2–10)	Colonial Life Arena (15,385); Columbia, SC
02/15/2018; 8:00 pm		at No. 17 Texas A&M	L 80–85	10–16 (2–11)	Reed Arena (4,000); College Station, TX
02/18/2018; 1:00 pm, SECN		Vanderbilt	W 88–71	11–16 (3–11)	O'Connell Center (2,007); Gainesville, FL
02/21/2018; 7:00 pm		No. 15 Tennessee	L 42–70	11–17 (3–12)	O'Connell Center (1,669); Gainesville, FL
02/25/2018; 12:00 pm, SECN		at No. 19 Georgia	L 43–63	11–18 (3–13)	Stegeman Coliseum (4,568); Athens, GA
SEC Women's Tournament
02/28/2018; 12:00 pm, SECN	(11)	vs. (14) Ole Miss; First Round	L 43–48	11–19	Bridgestone Arena (4,371); Nashville, TN
*Non-conference game. ^{#}Rankings from AP Poll. (#) Tournament seedings in parentheses. All times are in Eastern Time.

== See also ==
- 2017–18 Florida Gators men's basketball team
