= 2018 SEC women's basketball tournament =

Postseason women's basketball tournament

- Classification: Division I
- Season: 2017–18
- Teams: 14
- Site: Bridgestone Arena; Nashville, TN
- Champions: South Carolina (4th title)
- Winning coach: Dawn Staley (4th title)
- MVP: A'ja Wilson (South Carolina)
- Attendance: 45,174
- Television: SEC Network, ESPN2, ESPNU

2017–18 SEC women's basketball standings
	Conf.				Overall
Team	W		L	PCT	W		L	PCT
No. 4 Mississippi State	16	–	0	1.000	37	–	2	.949
No. 7 South Carolina †	12	–	4	.750	29	–	7	.806
No. 18 Georgia	12	–	4	.750	26	–	7	.788
No. 12 Tennessee	11	–	5	.688	25	–	8	.758
No. 17 Missouri	11	–	5	.688	24	–	8	.750
No. 14 Texas A&M	11	–	5	.688	26	–	10	.722
No. 24 LSU	11	–	5	.688	19	–	10	.655
Alabama	7	–	9	.438	20	–	14	.588
Kentucky	6	–	10	.375	15	–	17	.469
Auburn	5	–	11	.313	14	–	15	.483
Arkansas	3	–	13	.188	13	–	18	.419
Florida	3	–	13	.188	11	–	19	.367
Vanderbilt	3	–	13	.188	7	–	24	.226
Ole Miss	1	–	15	.063	12	–	19	.387
† 2018 SEC tournament winner As of April 1, 2018; Rankings from AP poll

The 2018 Southeastern Conference women's basketball tournament was the postseason women's basketball tournament for the Southeastern Conference held at Bridgestone Arena in Nashville, Tennessee, from February 28 through March 4, 2018. South Carolina defeated the regular-season champions Mississippi State to earn an automatic bid to the 2018 NCAA Women's Division I Basketball Tournament.

== Seeds ==
Seed	School	Conference record	Overall record	Tiebreaker
1	Mississippi State^{‡†}	16–0	32–0	
2	South Carolina^{†}	12–4	25–6	1–0 vs. UGA
3	Georgia^{†}	12–4	25–6	0–1 vs. SC
4	LSU^{†}	11–5	19–9	1–0 vs. MIZZOU, 1–0 vs. TEN, 1–1 vs. TXAM
5	Texas A&M^{#}	11–5	24–9	1–0 vs. MIZZOU, 1–1 vs. LSU, 1–1 vs. TEN
6	Missouri^{#}	11–5	24–7	1–0 vs. TEN, 0–1 LSU, 0–1 vs. TXAM
7	Tennessee^{#}	11–5	24–7	1–1 vs. TXAM, 0–1 vs. LSU, 0–1 vs. MIZZOU
8	Alabama^{#}	7–9	17–13	
9	Kentucky^{#}	6–10	15–16	
10	Auburn^{#}	5–11	14–15	
11	Florida	3–13	11–19	1–0 vs. VANDY, 1–0 vs. ARK
12	Vanderbilt	3–13	7–24	0–1 vs. UF, 1–0 vs. ARK
13	Arkansas	3–13	13–18	0–1 vs. UF, 0–1 vs. VANDY
14	Ole Miss	1–15	12–19	
‡ – SEC regular season champions, and tournament No. 1 seed. † – Received a double-bye in the conference tournament. # – Received a single-bye in the conference tournament. Overall records include all games played in the SEC Tournament.

== Schedule ==
Game	Time*	Matchup^{#}	Television	Attendance
First round – Wednesday, February 28
1	11:00 am	#12 Vanderbilt vs. #13 Arkansas	SEC Network	4,371
2	1:30 pm	#11 Florida vs. #14 Ole Miss	SEC Network	4,371
Second round – Thursday, March 1
3	Noon	#8 Alabama vs. #9 Kentucky	SEC Network	3,889
4	2:30 pm	#5 Texas A&M vs. #13 Arkansas	SEC Network	3,889
5	6:00 pm	#7 Tennessee vs. #10 Auburn	SEC Network	6,047
6	8:30 pm	#6 Missouri vs. #14 Ole Miss	SEC Network	6,047
Quarterfinals – Friday, March 2
7	Noon	#1 Mississippi State vs. #9 Kentucky	SEC Network	6,344
8	2:30 pm	#4 LSU vs. #5 Texas A&M	SEC Network	6,344
9	6:00 pm	#2 South Carolina vs. #7 Tennessee	SEC Network	7,489
10	8:30 pm	#3 Georgia vs. #6 Missouri	SEC Network	7,489
Semifinals – Saturday, March 3
11	4:00 pm	#1 Mississippi State vs #5 Texas A&M	ESPNU	8,819
12	6:30 pm	#2 South Carolina vs #3 Georgia	ESPNU	8,819
Championship – Sunday, March 4
13	3:30 pm	#1 Mississippi State vs #2 South Carolina	ESPN2	8,215
*Game times in CT. # – Rankings denote tournament seed

== Bracket ==
- All times are Central

First round Wednesday, February 28; SECN; 11AM; 1:25PM
12	Vanderbilt	76
13	Arkansas	88
11	Florida	43
14	Ole Miss	48

Second round Thursday, March 1 SECN; 12PM; 2:25PM; 6PM; 8:25PM
9	Kentucky	71
8	Alabama	64
13	Arkansas	52
5	Texas A&M	82
10	Auburn	61
7	Tennessee	64
14	Ole Miss	50
6	Missouri	59

Quarterfinals; Friday, March 2 SECN; 12PM; 2:25PM; 6PM; 8:25PM
9	Kentucky	58
1	Mississippi State	81
5	Texas A&M	75
4	LSU	69
7	Tennessee	62
2	South Carolina	73
6	Missouri	41
3	Georgia	55

Semifinals; Saturday, March 3 ESPNU; 4PM; 6:25PM
1	Mississippi State	70
5	Texas A&M	55
2	South Carolina	71
3	Georgia	49

Championship; Sunday, March 4 ESPN2; 3:30PM
1	Mississippi State	51
2	South Carolina	62

== See also ==
- 2018 SEC men's basketball tournament
