= Cameron Newbauer =

American college basketball coach

Biographical details
- Born: June 12, 1978 (age 48); Fort Wayne, Indiana, U.S.
- Education: IPFW

Playing career
- 1997–1998: Madonna

Coaching career (HC unless noted)
- 2001–2005: Siena (assistant)
- 2005–2007: Georgia (men's assistant)
- 2008–2011: Georgia (women's assistant)
- 2011–2013: Louisville (assistant)
- 2013–2017: Belmont
- 2017–2021: Florida

Head coaching record
- Overall: 125–121 (.508)

Cameron Michael Newbauer (born June 12, 1978) is an American college basketball coach. He most recently was the former head coach of the women's basketball program at the University of Florida from 2017 through 2021.

== Biography ==
Newbauer played one season at Madonna College before returning to his hometown to complete his education at Indiana University – Purdue University Fort Wayne. At IPFW, he was a student assistant to the Mastodons and coached at Leo High School before receiving his elementary education degree in 2001. He and the former Sarah Millender were married in 2011.

== Coaching career ==
On May 17, 2013, after a dozen years as an assistant coach for successful programs at three Division I schools, Cameron Newbauer was introduced as the fourth head coach in the history of Belmont University women's basketball.

In the opening round of the 2014 WNIT, Coach Newbauer faced an Indiana team that included his sister, Andrea Newbauer, a senior guard.

On March 27, 2017, Newbauer was announced as the 10th head coach of the University of Florida women's basketball program.

On July 16, 2021, Newbauer announced he was resigning as Head Coach citing “personal reasons.”

On September 27, 2021, it was revealed that Newbauer's resignation was due to a pattern of physical and verbal abuse of both student players and staff.

== Head coaching record ==
Record table
Season	Team	Overall	Conference	Standing	Postseason
Belmont Bruins (Ohio Valley Conference) (2013–2017)
2013–14	Belmont	14–18	10–6	1st (East)	WNIT First Round
2014–15	Belmont	14–17	10–6	T-4th	
2015–16	Belmont	24–9	13–3	2nd	NCAA First Round
2016–17	Belmont	27–6	16–0	1st	NCAA First Round
Belmont:		79–50 (.612)	49–15 (.766)		
Florida Gators (Southeastern Conference) (2017–2021)
2017–18	Florida	11–19	3–13	11th	
2018–19	Florida	8–23	3–13	T-12th	
2019–20	Florida	15–15	6–10	10th	
2020–21	Florida	12–14	3–11	12th	WNIT Second Round
Florida:		46–71 (.393)	15–47 (.242)		
Total:		125–121 (.508)			
National champion Postseason invitational champion Conference regular season champion Conference regular season and conference tournament champion Division regular season champion Division regular season and conference tournament champion Conference tournament champion

== See also ==
- Florida Gators
- History of the University of Florida
- University Athletic Association
