= 2017–18 Georgia Southern Eagles women's basketball team =

Intercollegiate basketball season

2017–18 Georgia Southern Eagles women's basketball
- Conference: Sun Belt Conference
- Record: 5–25 (2–16 Sun Belt)
- Head coach: Kip Drown (3rd season)
- Assistant coaches: Lisa Jackson; Alex Stewart; Toby Wagoner
- Home arena: Hanner Fieldhouse

2017–18 Sun Belt Conference women's basketball standings
	Conf.				Overall
Team	W		L	PCT	W		L	PCT
Little Rock †	17	–	1	.944	23	–	10	.697
Texas State	14	–	4	.778	23	–	10	.697
UT Arlington	12	–	6	.667	18	–	12	.600
Troy	12	–	6	.667	18	–	13	.581
South Alabama	11	–	7	.611	21	–	13	.618
Coastal Carolina	10	–	8	.556	17	–	14	.548
Louisiana	10	–	8	.556	17	–	16	.515
Arkansas State	10	–	8	.556	15	–	15	.500
Appalachian State	5	–	13	.278	8	–	23	.258
Georgia State	4	–	14	.222	8	–	22	.267
Georgia Southern	2	–	16	.111	5	–	25	.167
Louisiana–Monroe	1	–	17	.056	4	–	26	.133
† 2018 Sun Belt tournament winner

The 2017–18 Georgia Southern Eagles women's basketball team represented Georgia Southern University in the 2017–18 NCAA Division I women's basketball season. The Eagles, led by third year head coach Kip Drown, played their home games at Hanner Fieldhouse and were members of the Sun Belt Conference. They finished the season 5–25, 2–16 in Sun Belt play to finish in eleventh place. They lost in the first round of the Sun Belt women's tournament to Louisiana.

== Previous season ==
They finished the season 13–17, 9–9 in Sun Belt play to finish in sixth place. They lost in the first round of the Sun Belt women's tournament to Arkansas State.

== Roster ==
2017–18 Georgia Southern Eagles women's basketball team
Players
Coaches

Pos.	#	Name	Height	Year	Previous school	Hometown
G	0	Alexis Brown	5 ft 6 in (1.68 m)	So	Morgan County HS	Madison, GA
G	2	Trellanie English-Lurry	5 ft 7 in (1.7 m)	Sr	Nova HS	Miami, FL
G	4	Jakayvea Akins	5 ft 6 in (1.68 m)	RS Jr	Effingham County HS	Clyo, GA
G/F	5	Alexis Foulks	6 ft 0 in (1.83 m)	Sr	Columbia HS	Columbia, SC
G/F	13	Nakol Franks	5 ft 7 in (1.7 m)	So	Wren HS	Greenville, SC
G	15	Amira Atwater	5 ft 6 in (1.68 m)	So	Douglas County HS	Douglasville, GA
F	22	Aliyah Belcher	5 ft 11 in (1.8 m)	Fr	Parkway North HS	St. Louis, MO
G	23	Tatum Barber	5 ft 10 in (1.78 m)	Fr	Liberty Christian School	Dallas, TX
G/F	24	Rhein Beamon	5 ft 8 in (1.73 m)	Jr	Stephenson HS	Stone Mountain, GA
F/C	25	Sierra Butler	6 ft 2 in (1.88 m)	Sr	Norcross HS	Norcross, GA
F	32	Hailey Dias-Allen	6 ft 2 in (1.88 m)	So	Southeast Guilford HS	Greensboro, NC
F	33	Victoria Stavropoulos	6 ft 0 in (1.83 m)	So	Carl Sandburg HS	Orland Park, IL
F/C	42	Sarah Moore	6 ft 1 in (1.85 m)	Fr	Middleton HS	Spring Hill, FL
F/C	45	Alisha Owens	6 ft 0 in (1.83 m)	Fr	Henderson County HS	Henderson, KY

Head coach

- Kip Drown (Missouri State)

Assistant coach(es)

- Lisa Jackson (Erskine)
- Alex Stewart (Georgia Tech)
- Toby Wagoner (Eastern Illinois)

Legend

- (C) Team captain
- (S) Suspended
- (I) Ineligible
- (W) Walk-on
- Injured
- Current redshirt

Roster
Last update: January 12, 2018

== Schedule ==
Date time, TV	Rank^{#}	Opponent^{#}	Result	Record	Site (attendance) city, state
Exhibition
10/31/2017*; 6:30 pm		Fort Valley State	W 92–47		Hanner Fieldhouse (317); Statesboro, GA
Non-conference regular season
11/10/2017*; 5:30 pm		at North Carolina A&T	L 49–60	0–1	Corbett Sports Center (1,411); Greensboro, NC
11/13/2017*; 5:00 pm		Coastal Georgia	W 68–63	1–1	Hanner Fieldhouse (315); Statesboro, GA
11/16/2017*; 7:00 pm, ESPN3		at Mercer	L 45–72	1–2	Hawkins Arena (1,172); Macon, GA
11/19/2017*; 2:00 pm		Alabama	L 36–84	1–3	Hanner Fieldhouse (458); Statesboro, GA
11/21/2017*; 5:30 pm		at South Carolina State	W 61–58	2–3	SHM Memorial Center (206); Orangeburg, SC
11/27/2017*; 6:30 pm		Thomas	W 79–51	3–3	Hanner Fieldhouse (150); Statesboro, GA
11/29/2017*; 6:30 pm		Savannah State	L 67–71	3–4	Hanner Fieldhouse (225); Statesboro, GA
12/10/2017*; 2:00 pm		at UCF	L 38–62	3–5	CFE Arena (2,868); Orlando, FL
12/15/2017*; 11:00 am		Kennesaw State	L 58–60 ^{OT}	3–6	Hanner Fieldhouse (2,123); Statesboro, GA
12/18/2017*; 6:30 pm		IUPUI	L 52–72	3–7	Hanner Fieldhouse (137); Statesboro, GA
12/21/2017*; 2:00 pm, ESPN3		Stony Brook	L 58–60	3–8	Hanner Fieldhouse (133); Statesboro, GA
Sun Belt regular season
12/29/2017; 6:00 pm, ESPN3		at Troy	L 47–88	3–9 (0–1)	Trojan Arena (912); Troy, AL
12/31/2017; 2:00 pm		at South Alabama	L 52–79	3–10 (0–2)	Mitchell Center (1,612); Mobile, AL
01/04/2018; 5:00 pm		Arkansas State	L 62–71	3–11 (0–3)	Hanner Fieldhouse (135); Statesboro, GA
01/06/2018; 2:00 pm		Little Rock	L 34–64	3–12 (0–4)	Hanner Fieldhouse (211); Statesboro, GA
01/11/2018; 5:00 pm		at Coastal Carolina	L 51–54	3–13 (0–5)	HTC Center (295); Conway, SC
01/13/2018; 1:00 pm		at Appalachian State	L 56–87	3–14 (0–6)	Holmes Center (357); Boone, NC
01/20/2018; 12:00 pm, ESPN3		at Georgia State; Modern Day Hate	L 56–71	3–15 (0–7)	GSU Sports Arena (806); Atlanta, GA
01/25/2018; 5:00 pm		Texas State	L 56–81	3–16 (0–8)	Hanner Fieldhouse (147); Statesboro, GA
01/27/2018; 2:00 pm		Texas–Arlington	W 73–68	4–16 (1–8)	Hanner Fieldhouse (343); Statesboro, GA
02/01/2018; 6:00 pm		at Little Rock	L 52–92	4–17 (1–9)	Jack Stephens Center (2,084); Little Rock, AR
02/03/2018; 4:00 pm		at Arkansas State	L 48–69	4–18 (1–10)	First National Bank Arena (854); Jonesboro, AR
02/08/2018; 5:00 pm, ESPN3		Louisiana–Monroe	W 75–55	5–18 (2–10)	Hanner Fieldhouse (337); Statesboro, GA
02/10/2018; 2:00 pm		Louisiana	L 48–58	5–19 (2–11)	Hanner Fieldhouse (572); Statesboro, GA
02/17/2018; 12:00 pm		Georgia State; Modern Day Hate	L 58–66	5–20 (2–12)	Hanner Fieldhouse (437); Statesboro, GA
02/22/2018; 12:30 pm, ESPN3		at Texas–Arlington	L 49–70	5–21 (2–13)	College Park Center (5,590); Arlington, TX
02/24/2018; 5:00 pm, ESPN3		at Texas State	L 51–60	5–22 (2–14)	Strahan Coliseum (1,934); San Marcos, TX
03/01/2018; 5:00 pm		South Alabama	L 74–81 ^{OT}	5–23 (2–15)	Hanner Fieldhouse (139); Statesboro, GA
03/03/2018; 2:00 pm		Troy	L 80–95	5–24 (2–16)	Hanner Fieldhouse (453); Statesboro, GA
Sun Belt Women's Tournament
03/06/2018; 8:30 pm, ESPN3	(11)	vs. (6) Louisiana; First Round	L 81–88 ^{3OT}	5–26	Lakefront Arena (628); New Orleans, LA
*Non-conference game. ^{#}Rankings from AP Poll. (#) Tournament seedings in parentheses. All times are in Eastern Time.

== See also ==
2017–18 Georgia Southern Eagles men's basketball team
