= 2017–18 Georgia State Panthers women's basketball team =

Intercollegiate basketball season

2017–18 Georgia State Panthers women's basketball
- Conference: Sun Belt Conference
- Record: 8–22 (4–14 Sun Belt)
- Head coach: Sharon Baldwin-Tener (8th season)
- Assistant coaches: Tron Griffin; Kelly Mathis; Jasmine Young
- Home arena: GSU Sports Arena

2017–18 Sun Belt Conference women's basketball standings
	Conf.				Overall
Team	W		L	PCT	W		L	PCT
Little Rock †	17	–	1	.944	23	–	10	.697
Texas State	14	–	4	.778	23	–	10	.697
UT Arlington	12	–	6	.667	18	–	12	.600
Troy	12	–	6	.667	18	–	13	.581
South Alabama	11	–	7	.611	21	–	13	.618
Coastal Carolina	10	–	8	.556	17	–	14	.548
Louisiana	10	–	8	.556	17	–	16	.515
Arkansas State	10	–	8	.556	15	–	15	.500
Appalachian State	5	–	13	.278	8	–	23	.258
Georgia State	4	–	14	.222	8	–	22	.267
Georgia Southern	2	–	16	.111	5	–	25	.167
Louisiana–Monroe	1	–	17	.056	4	–	26	.133
† 2018 Sun Belt tournament winner

The 2017–18 Georgia State Panthers women's basketball team represented Georgia State University in the 2017–18 NCAA Division I women's basketball season. The Panthers, coached by Sharon Baldwin-Tener in her eighth season, were a member of the Sun Belt Conference, and played their home games on campus at the GSU Sports Arena. They finished season 8–22, 4–14 in Sun Belt play to finish in tenth place. They lost in the first round of the Sun Belt women's tournament to Coastal Carolina.

On March 14, head coach Sharon Baldwin's contract was not renewed. She finished an eight-year record at Georgia State of 88–152.

== Roster ==
2016–17 Georgia State Panthers women's basketball team
Players
Coaches

Pos.	#	Name	Height	Year	Previous school	Hometown
F	0	Allison Johnson	6 ft 0 in (1.83 m)	RS Jr	Norcross; Kennesaw State	Norcross, GA
G	1	Janessa Murphey	5 ft 7 in (1.7 m)	Jr	Dutchtown; Tallahassee CC	McDonough, GA
F	2	K. K. Williams	5 ft 10 in (1.78 m)	Jr	Blackman	Murfreesboro, TN
G	5	Shaliaya Fluker	5 ft 10 in (1.78 m)	Jr	Belleville West; Walters State CC	Belleville, MO
G	10	Kiersten Hunter	5 ft 5 in (1.65 m)	So	Parkview	Lilburn, GA
F	11	Juliet James	6 ft 0 in (1.83 m)	Jr	Paterson, East Side; Northwest Tech CC	Kaduna, Nigeria
C	12	Walnatia Wright	6 ft 2 in (1.88 m)	RS Sr	Laney; Texas A&M	Augusta, GA
G	13	Jada Lewis	5 ft 7 in (1.7 m)	So	McEachern	Powder Springs, GA
F	20	Francesca Minali	6 ft 2 in (1.88 m)	RS Jr	Northeast CC	Stezzano, Italy
G	21	Kierra Henry	5 ft 9 in (1.75 m)	Jr	Pope	Marietta, GA
G/F	22	Deja Mitchell	6 ft 0 in (1.83 m)	Fr	Duluth	Duluth, GA
G	23	Madison Newby	5 ft 8 in (1.73 m)	RS So	Archer	Lawrenceville, GA
C	30	Shaquanda Miller-McCray	6 ft 3 in (1.91 m)	So	Crestwood	Sumter, SC
G/F	32	Victoria Middlebrooks	6 ft 1 in (1.85 m)	Jr	Griffin; Southwest Tennessee CC	Griffin, GA
F/C	33	Rakeah Williams	6 ft 1 in (1.85 m)	Fr	Westlake	Atlanta, GA

Head coach

- Sharon Baldwin-Tener (Georgia)

Assistant coach(es)

- Tron Griffin (Bethune–Cookman)
- Kelly Mathis (Pfeiffer)
- Latricia Trammell (East Central)

Legend

- (C) Team captain
- (S) Suspended
- (I) Ineligible
- (W) Walk-on
- Injured
- Current redshirt

Roster

== Schedule ==
Date time, TV	Rank^{#}	Opponent^{#}	Result	Record	Site (attendance) city, state
Non-conference regular season
November 11*; 4:00 pm		at Florida	L 66–82	0-1	O'Connell Center (1,509); Gainesville, FL
November 16*; 8:00 pm		at No. 7 Mississippi State	L 50–106	0–2	Humphrey Coliseum (4,584); Starkville, MS
November 21*; 11:00 am, ACCN Extra		at Georgia Tech	L 51–75	0–3	McCamish Pavilion (1,024); Atlanta, GA
November 24*; 4:00 pm, ESPN3		VCU; GSU Thanksgiving Classic	W 61–56	1–3	GSU Sports Arena (442); Atlanta, GA
November 26*; 2:00 pm, ESPN3		Western Kentucky; GSU Thanksgiving Classic	L 63–74	1–4	GSU Sports Arena (412); Atlanta, GA
November 30*; 7:00 pm, ESPN3		at Kennesaw State	L 61–71	1–5	KSU Convocation Center (545); Kennesaw, GA
December 3*; 2:00 pm, ESPN3		Allen	W 101–56	2–5	GSU Sports Arena (376); Atlanta, GA
December 10*; 2:00 pm, ESPN3		North Greenville	W 91–89	3–5	GSU Sports Arena (369); Atlanta, GA
December 15*; 7:00 pm, ESPN3		FAU	L 50–82	3–7	GSU Sports Arena (125); Atlanta, GA
December 19*; 1:00 pm, ESPN3		Jacksonville State	W 55–41	4–6	GSU Sports Arena (345); Atlanta, GA
December 21*; 1:00 pm		at UNC Wilmington	L 62–74	4–7	Trask Coliseum (904); Wilmington, NC
Sun Belt regular season
December 29; 6:05 pm		at South Alabama	L 52–88	4–8 (0–1)	Mitchell Center (1,788); Mobile, AL
December 31; 2:00 pm, ESPN3		at Troy	L 86–90	4–9 (0–2)	Trojan Arena (927); Troy, AL
January 4; 5:00 pm, ESPN3		Little Rock	L 50–65	4–10 (0–3)	GSU Sports Arena (314); Atlanta, GA
January 6; 12:00 pm, ESPN3		Arkansas State	L 58–75	4–11 (0–4)	GSU Sports Arena (367); Atlanta, GA
January 11; 5:00 pm		at Appalachian State	L 62–77	4–12 (0–5)	Holmes Center (282); Boone, NC
January 13; 1:00 pm		at Coastal Carolina	L 49–64	4–13 (0–6)	HTC Center (295); Conway, SC
January 20; 12:00 pm, ESPN3		Georgia Southern; Modern Day Hate	W 71–56	5–13 (1–6)	GSU Sports Arena (806); Atlanta, GA
January 25; 5:00 pm, ESPN3		Texas–Arlington	L 76–81 ^{OT}	5–14 (1–7)	GSU Sports Arena (323); Atlanta, GA
January 27; 12:00 pm, ESPN3		Texas State	L 63–83	5–15 (1–8)	GSU Sports Arena (332); Atlanta, GA
February 1; 4:00 pm		at Arkansas State	L 63–76	5–16 (1–9)	First National Bank Arena; Jonesboro, AR
February 3; 2:00 pm		at Little Rock	L 47–54	5–17 (1–10)	Jack Stephens Center (2,373); Little Rock, AR
February 8; 5:00 pm, ESPN3		Louisiana	L 60–75	5–18 (1–11)	GSU Sports Arena (363); Atlanta, GA
February 10; 12:00 pm, ESPN3		Louisiana–Monroe	W 70–57	6–18 (2–11)	GSU Sports Arena (493); Atlanta, GA
February 17; 2:00 pm		at Georgia Southern; Modern Day Hate	W 66–58	7–18 (3–11)	Hanner Fieldhouse (437); Statesboro, GA
February 22; 1:00 pm		at Texas State	L 40–62	7–19 (3–12)	Strahan Coliseum (4,225); San Marcos, TX
February 24; 3:00 pm, ESPN3		at Texas–Arlington	L 57-62	7–20 (3–13)	College Park Center; Arlington, TX
March 1; 5:00 pm, ESPN3		Troy	W 85–78	8–20 (4–13)	GSU Sports Arena (398); Atlanta, GA
March 3; 12:00 pm, ESPN3		South Alabama	L 69–70	8–21 (4–14)	GSU Sports Arena (448); Atlanta, GA
Sun Belt Women's Tournament
March 6; 6:00 pm, ESPN3	(10)	vs. (7) Coastal Carolina; First Round	L 55–74	8–22	Lakefront Arena; New Orleans, LA
*Non-conference game. ^{#}Rankings from AP Poll. (#) Tournament seedings in parentheses. All times are in Eastern Time.

== See also ==
- 2017–18 Georgia State Panthers men's basketball team
