= 2017–18 Louisiana–Monroe Warhawks women's basketball team =

Women's basketball team

2017–18 Louisiana–Monroe Warhawks women's basketball
- Conference: Sun Belt Conference
- Record: 4–26 (1–17 Sun Belt)
- Head coach: Jeff Dow (4th season)
- Assistant coaches: E.J. Lee Smith; Chelsia Lymon; David Saur
- Home arena: Fant–Ewing Coliseum

2017–18 Sun Belt Conference women's basketball standings
	Conf.				Overall
Team	W		L	PCT	W		L	PCT
Little Rock †	17	–	1	.944	23	–	10	.697
Texas State	14	–	4	.778	23	–	10	.697
UT Arlington	12	–	6	.667	18	–	12	.600
Troy	12	–	6	.667	18	–	13	.581
South Alabama	11	–	7	.611	21	–	13	.618
Coastal Carolina	10	–	8	.556	17	–	14	.548
Louisiana	10	–	8	.556	17	–	16	.515
Arkansas State	10	–	8	.556	15	–	15	.500
Appalachian State	5	–	13	.278	8	–	23	.258
Georgia State	4	–	14	.222	8	–	22	.267
Georgia Southern	2	–	16	.111	5	–	25	.167
Louisiana–Monroe	1	–	17	.056	4	–	26	.133
† 2018 Sun Belt tournament winner As of March 19, 2018; Rankings from AP poll

The 2017–18 Louisiana–Monroe women's basketball team represented University of Louisiana at Monroe in the 2017–18 NCAA Division I women's basketball season. The Warhawks, led by fourth-year head coach Jeff Dow, played their home games at Fant–Ewing Coliseum and were members of the Sun Belt Conference. They finished the season 4–26, 1–17 in Sun Belt play, to finish in last place. They lost in the first round of the Sun Belt women's tournament to South Alabama.

== Previous season ==
They finished the 2016–17 season 6–24, 3–15 in Sun Belt play, to finish in last place. They lost in the first round of the Sun Belt women's tournament to Louisiana–Lafayette.

== Roster ==
2017–18 Louisiana–Monroe Warhawks women's basketball team
Players
Coaches

Pos.	#	Name	Height	Year	Previous school	Hometown
G	2	Breanna Stephens	5 ft 7 in (1.7 m)	Fr	Chapel Hill HS	Douglasville, GA
G	3	Alexus Johnson	5 ft 11 in (1.8 m)	Jr	Field Kindley HS; Dodge City CC	Coffeyville, KS
G	10	Lauren Marker	5 ft 6 in (1.68 m)	Jr	Ovey Comeaux HS	Lafayette, LA
G/F	11	Whitney Goins	5 ft 11 in (1.8 m)	Fr	Anacoco HS	Anacoco, LA
G	13	Destini Lunsford	5 ft 7 in (1.7 m)	So	Corsicana HS	Corsicana, TX
G	20	Tiara Malone	5 ft 9 in (1.75 m)	Fr	Arlington Martin HS	Arlington, TX
F	21	Logan Oesteich	6 ft 0 in (1.83 m)	So	Bismarck HS	Arkadelphia, AR
G	22	Camryn Johnson	5 ft 6 in (1.68 m)	Fr	Elizabeth Seton HS	Fort Washington, MD
G	23	Carissa Moody	5 ft 10 in (1.78 m)	So	Plano Senior HS	Plano, TX
C	24	Diamond Brooks	6 ft 2 in (1.88 m)	Fr	Jewel M. Sumner HS	Kentwood, LA
G/F	25	Jessica Harris	5 ft 11 in (1.8 m)	Jr	Thomas Edison HS; Mount St. Mary's	Woodbridge, VA
G	30	Arsula Clark	5 ft 9 in (1.75 m)	Fr	Douglasville HS	Douglasville, GA
F	31	LaTangellia Walker	6 ft 1 in (1.85 m)	Jr	Minor HS; Shelton State CC	Birmingham, AL
F	34	Gabriella Cortez	5 ft 11 in (1.8 m)	Sr	Natchitoches Central; Southwest CC	Natchitoches, LA
F	35	London Archer	6 ft 1 in (1.85 m)	So	Putnam City North	Oklahoma City, OK

Head coach

- Jeff Dow (Oregon)

Assistant coach(es)

- E.J. Lee Smith (Louisiana–Monroe)
- Chelsia Lymon (Middle Tennessee)
- David Saur (Thiel)

Legend

- (C) Team captain
- (S) Suspended
- (I) Ineligible
- (W) Walk-on
- Injured
- Current redshirt

Roster
Last update: August 15, 2024

== Schedule ==
Date time, TV	Rank^{#}	Opponent^{#}	Result	Record	Site (attendance) city, state
Non-conference regular season
November 10, 2017*; 6:00 p.m.		Centenary	W 90–53	1–0	Fant–Ewing Coliseum (455); Monroe, LA
November 13, 2017*; 6:00 p.m.		at Grambling State	L 52–61	1–1	Fredrick C. Hobdy Assembly Center (1,229); Grambling, LA
November 21, 2017*; 5:00 p.m.		Millsaps	W 73–41	2–1	Fant–Ewing Coliseum (1,927); Monroe, LA
November 26, 2017*; 2:00 p.m.		at McNeese State	L 61–65	2–2	Burton Coliseum (751); Lake Charles, LA
November 29, 2017*; 6:00 p.m.		at Auburn	L 41–67	2–3	Auburn Arena (2,769); Auburn, AL
December 3, 2017*; 2:00 p.m.		Northwestern State	L 48–70	2–4	Fant–Ewing Coliseum (969); Monroe, LA
December 11, 2017*; 6:30 p.m.		at Louisiana Tech	L 49–71	2–5	Thomas Assembly Center (2,045); Ruston, LA
December 14, 2017*; 7:00 p.m.		at Rice	L 47–63	2–6	Tudor Fieldhouse (423); Houston, TX
December 17, 2017*; 2:00 p.m.		New Orleans	L 51–89	2–7	Fant–Ewing Coliseum (710); Monroe, LA
December 19, 2017*; 6:00 p.m.		Houston Baptist	W 77–73	3–7	Fant–Ewing Coliseum (639); Monroe, LA
December 21, 2017*; 7:00 p.m.		at Oklahoma State	L 58–112	3–8	Gallagher-Iba Arena (1,686); Stillwater, OK
Sun Belt regular season
December 29, 2017; 5:00 p.m.		at Arkansas State	L 62–78	3–9 (0–1)	First National Bank Arena; Jonesboro, AR
December 31, 2017; 2:00 p.m.		at Little Rock	L 37–57	3–10 (0–2)	Jack Stephens Center (1,632); Little Rock, AR
January 4, 2018; 5:00 p.m.		Coastal Carolina	W 62–56	4–10 (1–2)	Fant–Ewing Coliseum (1,318); Monroe, LA
January 6, 2018; 12:00 p.m.		Appalachian State	L 67–71	4–11 (1–3)	Fant–Ewing Coliseum (1,423); Monroe, LA
January 13, 2018; 4:00 p.m., CST		at Louisiana	L 55–63	4–12 (1–4)	Cajundome (711); Lafayette, LA
January 18, 2018; 5:30 p.m.		at Texas State	L 52–86	4–13 (1–5)	Strahan Coliseum (2,233); San Marcos, TX
January 20, 2018; 2:00 p.m., ESPN3		at Texas–Arlington	L 61–70	4–14 (1–6)	College Park Center; Arlington, TX
January 25, 2018; 5:00 p.m.		Troy	L 79–86	4–15 (1–7)	Fant–Ewing Coliseum (1,651); Monroe, LA
January 27, 2018; 12:00 p.m.		South Alabama	L 60–67	4–16 (1–8)	Fant–Ewing Coliseum (1,635); Monroe, LA
February 3, 2018; 12:00 p.m.		Louisiana	L 48–76	4–17 (1–9)	Fant–Ewing Coliseum (2,269); Monroe, LA
February 8, 2018; 4:00 p.m., ESPN3		at Georgia Southern	L 55–75	4–18 (1–10)	Hanner Fieldhouse (337); Statesboro, GA
February 10, 2018; 11:00 a.m., ESPN3		at Georgia State	L 57–70	4–19 (1–11)	GSU Sports Arena (493); Atlanta, GA
February 15, 2018; 2:00 p.m.		Texas–Arlington	L 53–80	4–20 (1–12)	Fant–Ewing Coliseum (1,439); Monroe, LA
February 17, 2018; 12:00 p.m.		Texas State	L 45–81	4–21 (1–13)	Fant–Ewing Coliseum (1,810); Monroe, LA
February 22, 2018; 5:00 p.m.		at South Alabama	L 57–72	4–22 (1–14)	Mitchell Center (2,011); Mobile, AL
February 24, 2018; 2:00 p.m., ESPN3		at Troy	L 62–94	4–23 (1–15)	Trojan Arena (1,359); Troy, AL
March 1, 2018; 5:00 p.m.		Little Rock	L 47–71	4–24 (1–16)	Fant–Ewing Coliseum (1,537); Monroe, LA
March 3, 2018; 12:00 p.m.		Arkansas State	L 73–80	4–25 (1–17)	Fant–Ewing Coliseum (2,083); Monroe, LA
Sun Belt women's tournament
March 6, 2018; 2:00 p.m., ESPN3	(12)	vs. (5) South Alabama; First round	L 54–80	4–26	Lakefront Arena; New Orleans, LA
*Non-conference game. ^{#}Rankings from AP poll. (#) Tournament seedings in parentheses. All times are in Eastern.

== See also ==
- 2017–18 Louisiana–Monroe Warhawks men's basketball team
