= 2017–18 Texas State Bobcats women's basketball team =

Intercollegiate basketball season

2017–18 Texas State Bobcats women's basketball

WNIT, First Round
- Conference: Sun Belt Conference
- Record: 23–10 (14–4 Sun Belt)
- Head coach: Zenarae Antoine (6th season)
- Assistant coaches: Chandra Dorsey; Nate Teymer
- Home arena: Strahan Coliseum

2017–18 Sun Belt Conference women's basketball standings
| | Conf. | | | | Overall |
| Team | W | | L | PCT | W | | L | PCT |
|---|---|---|---|---|---|---|---|---|
| Little Rock † | 17 | – | 1 | .944 | 23 | – | 10 | .697 |
| Texas State | 14 | – | 4 | .778 | 23 | – | 10 | .697 |
| UT Arlington | 12 | – | 6 | .667 | 18 | – | 12 | .600 |
| Troy | 12 | – | 6 | .667 | 18 | – | 13 | .581 |
| South Alabama | 11 | – | 7 | .611 | 21 | – | 13 | .618 |
| Coastal Carolina | 10 | – | 8 | .556 | 17 | – | 14 | .548 |
| Louisiana | 10 | – | 8 | .556 | 17 | – | 16 | .515 |
| Arkansas State | 10 | – | 8 | .556 | 15 | – | 15 | .500 |
| Appalachian State | 5 | – | 13 | .278 | 8 | – | 23 | .258 |
| Georgia State | 4 | – | 14 | .222 | 8 | – | 22 | .267 |
| Georgia Southern | 2 | – | 16 | .111 | 5 | – | 25 | .167 |
| Louisiana–Monroe | 1 | – | 17 | .056 | 4 | – | 26 | .133 |
† 2018 Sun Belt tournament winner

The 2017–18 Texas State Bobcats women's basketball team represented Texas State University in the 2017–18 NCAA Division I women's basketball season. The Bobcats, led by sixth year head coach Zenarae Antoine, played their home games at Strahan Coliseum and were members of the Sun Belt Conference. They finished the season 23–10, 14–4 in Sun Belt play to finish in second place. They advanced to the championship game of the Sun Belt women's tournament, where they lost to Little Rock. They received an at-large bid to the WNIT, where they lost to Rice in the first round.

== Previous season ==
They finished the season 16–15, 11–7 in Sun Belt play to finish in a tie for fourth place. They lost in the quarterfinals of the Sun Belt women's tournament to Louisiana–Lafayette. They were invited to the WBI where they lost to Eastern Washington in the first round.

== Roster ==
2017–18 Texas State Bobcats women's basketball team
Players
Coaches

| Pos. | # | Name | Height | Year | Previous school | Hometown |
|---|---|---|---|---|---|---|
| F | 0 | Jayla Johnson | 6 ft 1 in (1.85 m) | Fr | Lincoln HS | Dallas, TX |
| G | 1 | Avionne Alexander | 5 ft 8 in (1.73 m) | Fr | Sunnyvale HS | Sunnyvale, TX |
| G | 2 | Toshua Leavitt | 5 ft 4 in (1.63 m) | Jr | Nixa HS | Nixa, MO |
| G | 3 | Chania Wright | 5 ft 8 in (1.73 m) | Fr | DeSoto HS | DeSoto, TX |
| G | 12 | Dabrasia Baty | 5 ft 6 in (1.68 m) | Jr | Bryan Adams HS; South Plains | Dallas, TX |
| F | 13 | Zandra Emanuel | 6 ft 0 in (1.83 m) | Sr | C.E. King HS; Coastal Bend College | Houston, TX |
| G/F | 15 | Ericka May | 5 ft 10 in (1.78 m) | Sr | Allen HS | Allen, TX |
| F | 22 | Ti'Aira Pitts | 6 ft 1 in (1.85 m) | Sr | Cedar Ridge HS | Austin, TX |
| G | 23 | Taeler Deer | 5 ft 5 in (1.65 m) | Sr | Channelview HS | Houston, TX |
| G | 24 | Brooke Holle | 5 ft 7 in (1.7 m) | So | Westlake HS | Austin, TX |
| G | 33 | Bailey Holle | 5 ft 7 in (1.7 m) | So | Westlake HS | Austin, TX |
| G/F | 50 | Zelor Massaquoi | 5 ft 7 in (1.7 m) | Sr | Reservoir HS; Grand Canyon | Monrovia, Liberia |

Head coach

- Zenarae Antoine (Colorado State)

Assistant coach(es)

- Chandra Dorsey (Mississippi)
- Nate Teymer (Grand View)

Legend

- (C) Team captain
- (S) Suspended
- (I) Ineligible
- (W) Walk-on
- Injured
- Current redshirt

Roster
Last update: January 13, 2018

== Schedule ==
| Date time, TV | Rank^{#} | Opponent^{#} | Result | Record | Site (attendance) city, state |
Non-conference regular season
| 11/12/2017*; 2:00 pm | | at Texas Tech | W 87–70 | 1–0 | United Supermarkets Arena (3,611); Lubbock, TX |
| 11/15/2017*; 6:00 pm | | at Incarnate Word | W 74–33 | 2–0 | McDermott Center (1,000); San Antonio, TX |
| 11/18/2017*; 2:00 pm | | at TCU | L 58–82 | 2–1 | Schollmaier Arena (1,766); Fort Worth, TX |
| 11/21/2017*; 6:00 pm | | at Texas Southern | W 70–56 | 3–1 | H&PE Arena (622); Houston, TX |
| 11/25/2017*; 2:00 pm | | Fresno State | W 76–59 | 4–1 | Strahan Coliseum (1,047); San Marcos, TX |
| 11/28/2017*; 7:00 pm | | Houston | L 67–72 | 4–2 | Strahan Coliseum (1,192); San Marcos, TX |
| 12/02/2017*; 7:00 pm | | Prairie View A&M | W 84–57 | 5–2 | Strahan Coliseum (1,287); San Marcos, TX |
| 12/05/2017*; 7:00 pm | | UTSA; I-35 Rivalry | W 91–38 | 6–2 | Strahan Coliseum (1,085); San Marcos, TX |
| 12/17/2017*; 3:00 pm | | at Sam Houston State | W 73–41 | 7–2 | Bernard Johnson Coliseum (567); Huntsville, TX |
| 12/20/2017*; 2:00 pm | | vs. Bethune–Cookman; Hatter Classic | L 56–62 | 7–3 | Edmunds Center (353); DeLand, FL |
| 12/21/2017*; 1:00 pm, ESPN3 | | at Stetson; Hatter Classic | L 54–61 | 7–4 | Edmunds Center (279); DeLand, FL |
Sun Belt regular season
| 12/29/2017; 4:00 pm | | at Appalachian State | W 69–54 | 8–4 (1–0) | Holmes Center (654); Boone, NC |
| 12/31/2017; 12:00 pm | | at Coastal Carolina | L 64–65 | 8–5 (1–1) | HTC Center (250); Conway, SC |
| 01/04/2018; 5:30 pm | | South Alabama | W 78–63 | 9–5 (2–1) | Strahan Coliseum (1,407); San Marcos, TX |
| 01/06/2018; 2:00 pm, ESPN3 | | Troy | W 83–75 | 10–5 (3–1) | Strahan Coliseum (1,560); San Marcos, TX |
| 01/11/2018; 5:00 pm | | at Arkansas State | W 67–55 | 11–5 (4–1) | First National Bank Arena (1,275); Jonesboro, AR |
| 01/13/2018; 3:00 pm | | at Arkansas State | L 48–63 | 10–6 (4–2) | Jack Stephens Center (2,165); Little Rock, AR |
| 01/18/2018; 5:30 pm | | Louisiana–Monroe | W 86–52 | 11–6 (5–2) | Strahan Coliseum (2,233); San Marcos, TX |
| 01/20/2018; 2:00 pm | | Louisiana | L 58–65 | 11–7 (5–3) | Strahan Coliseum (3,222); San Marcos, TX |
| 01/25/2018; 4:00 pm | | at Georgia Southern | W 81–56 | 12–7 (6–3) | Hanner Fieldhouse (147); Statesboro, GA |
| 01/27/2018; 11:00 am, ESPN3 | | at Georgia State | W 83–63 | 13–7 (7–3) | GSU Sports Arena (332); Atlanta, GA |
| 02/01/2018; 5:00 pm | | Coastal Carolina | W 78–69 | 14–7 (8–3) | Strahan Coliseum (2,278); San Marcos, TX |
| 02/03/2018; 2:00 pm | | Appalachian State | W 92–50 | 15–7 (9–3) | Strahan Coliseum (1,744); San Marcos, TX |
| 02/10/2018; 2:00 pm, ESPN3 | | at Texas–Arlington | L 59–61 ^{OT} | 15–8 (9–4) | College Park Center (2,602); Arlington, TX |
| 02/15/2018; 5:00 pm | | at Louisiana | W 56–53 | 17–8 (10–4) | Cajundome (936); Lafayette, LA |
| 02/17/2018; 12:00 pm | | at Louisiana–Monroe | W 81–45 | 18–8 (11–4) | Fant–Ewing Coliseum (1,810); Monroe, LA |
| 02/22/2018; 12:00 pm | | Georgia State | W 82–40 | 19–8 (12–4) | Strahan Coliseum (4,225); San Marcos, TX |
| 02/24/2018; 2:00 pm, ESPN3 | | Georgia Southern | W 60–51 | 20–8 (13–4) | Strahan Coliseum (1,934); San Marcos, TX |
| 03/03/2018; 2:00 pm | | Texas–Arlington | W 75–58 | 21–8 (14–4) | Strahan Coliseum (1,699); San Marcos, TX |
Sun Belt Women's Tournament
| 03/08/2018; 5:00 pm, ESPN3 | (2) | vs. (7) Coastal Carolina; Quarterfinals | W 78–69 | 22–8 | Lakefront Arena; New Orleans, LA |
| 03/10/2018; 5:00 pm, ESPN3 | (2) | vs. (6) Louisiana; Semifinals | W 62–56 | 23–8 | Lakefront Arena (898); New Orleans, LA |
| 03/11/2018; 6:00 pm, ESPN3 | (2) | vs. (1) Little Rock; Championship Game | L 53–54 | 23–9 | Lakefront Arena (1,214); New Orleans, LA |
WNIT
| 03/15/2018*; 7:00 pm | | at Rice; First Round | L 60–71 | 23–10 | Tudor Fieldhouse (320); Houston, TX |
*Non-conference game. ^{#}Rankings from AP Poll. (#) Tournament seedings in parentheses. All times are in Eastern Time.

== See also ==
- 2017–18 Texas State Bobcats men's basketball team
