= 2017–18 UT Arlington Mavericks women's basketball team =

Intercollegiate basketball season

2017–18 UT Arlington Mavericks women's basketball
- Conference: Sun Belt Conference
- Record: 18–12 (12–6 Sun Belt)
- Head coach: Krista Gerlich (5th season)
- Assistant coaches: Kristin Cole; Ashley Crawford; Talby Justus
- Home arena: College Park Center

2017–18 Sun Belt Conference women's basketball standings
	Conf.				Overall
Team	W		L	PCT	W		L	PCT
Little Rock †	17	–	1	.944	23	–	10	.697
Texas State	14	–	4	.778	23	–	10	.697
UT Arlington	12	–	6	.667	18	–	12	.600
Troy	12	–	6	.667	18	–	13	.581
South Alabama	11	–	7	.611	21	–	13	.618
Coastal Carolina	10	–	8	.556	17	–	14	.548
Louisiana	10	–	8	.556	17	–	16	.515
Arkansas State	10	–	8	.556	15	–	15	.500
Appalachian State	5	–	13	.278	8	–	23	.258
Georgia State	4	–	14	.222	8	–	22	.267
Georgia Southern	2	–	16	.111	5	–	25	.167
Louisiana–Monroe	1	–	17	.056	4	–	26	.133
† 2018 Sun Belt tournament winner

The 2017–18 UT Arlington Mavericks women's basketball team represented the University of Texas at Arlington in the 2017–18 NCAA Division I women's basketball season. The Mavericks, led by fifth-year head coach Krista Gerlich, played their home games at the College Park Center and were members of the Sun Belt Conference. They finished the season 18–12, 12–6 in Sun Belt play, to finish in a tie for third place. They lost in the quarterfinals of the Sun Belt women's tournament to Louisiana.

== Previous season ==
The Mavericks finished the season 22–9, 14–4 in Sun Belt play, to finish in second place. They advanced to the semifinals of the Sun Belt women's tournament where they lost to Troy. They were invited to the WNIT where they lost to Tulane in the first round.

== Roster ==
2017–18 Texas–Arlington Mavericks women's basketball team
Players
Coaches

Pos.	#	Name	Height	Year	Previous school	Hometown
G	0	Cierra Johnson	5 ft 9 in (1.75 m)	Sr	L D Bell	Bedford, TX
G	1	Laurynn McGowen	5 ft 6 in (1.68 m)	Jr	Seguin; New Mexico JC	Arlington, TX
G	2	Lauren Billie	5 ft 6 in (1.68 m)	Jr	East Central	Tulsa, OK
G	3	Crystal Allen	5 ft 9 in (1.75 m)	RS Sr	Trimble Tech; Seattle	Fort Worth, TX
G	5	Miranda LeJune	5 ft 6 in (1.68 m)	Sr	Pearland; San Jacinto College-North	Pearland, TX
G	10	Zhane Templeton	5 ft 10 in (1.78 m)	Jr	South Grand Prairie; Gonzaga	Austin, TX
G	11	Shelby Richards	5 ft 8 in (1.73 m)	Sr	Riverton; Odessa JC	South Jordan, UT
G	12	Brooke Alexander	6 ft 0 in (1.83 m)	RS So	Prestonwood Christian Academy; Liberty	Frisco, TX
F	13	Daiane Machado	6 ft 1 in (1.85 m)	Jr	New Mexico JC	Curitiba, Brazil
F	22	Jennifer Parker	6 ft 2 in (1.88 m)	Fr	Rouse	Leander, TX
G	24	Aysia Evans	5 ft 6 in (1.68 m)	So	Broken Arrow	Tulsa, OK
F	33	Kelsey Johnson	6 ft 3 in (1.91 m)	RS Fr	Washington	Washington, OK
C	40	Michaela Wright	6 ft 5 in (1.96 m)	Fr	Father Tolton Catholic	Columbia, MO
F	44	Rebekah Van Dijk	6 ft 5 in (1.96 m)	Sr	Nazareth	Nazareth, TX

Head coach

- Krista Gerlich (Texas Tech)

Assistant coach(es)

- Kristin Cole (Notre Dame)
- Ashley Crawford (Lamar)
- Talby Justus (Tabor)

Legend

- (C) Team captain
- (S) Suspended
- (I) Ineligible
- (W) Walk-on
- Injured
- Current redshirt

Roster

== Schedule ==
Date time, TV	Rank^{#}	Opponent^{#}	Result	Record	Site (attendance) city, state
Non-conference regular season
November 11, 2017*; 2:30 p.m., ESPN3		Incarnate Word	W 61–48	1–0	College Park Center (1,972); Arlington, TX
November 13, 2017*; 7:00 p.m., ESPN3		Oral Roberts	W 70–46	2–0	College Park Center (797); Arlington, TX
November 15, 2017*; 7:00 p.m.		at UTSA	W 69–68 ^{OT}	3–0	Convocation Center (265); San Antonio, TX
November 19, 2017*; 2:00 p.m., ESPN3		SMU	W 58–55	4–0	College Park Center (649); Arlington, TX
November 24, 2017*; 2:00 p.m., ESPN3		Fresno State	W 67–54	5–0	College Park Center (735); Arlington, TX
November 27, 2017*; 7:00 p.m.		at Utah	L 41–71	5–1	Jon M. Huntsman Center (917); Salt Lake City, UT
December 1, 2017*; 7:00 p.m., ESPN3		Houston	L 58–62	5–2	College Park Center (761); Arlington, TX
December 6, 2017*; 7:00 p.m., ESPN3		at Kansas State	L 56–70	5–3	Bramlage Coliseum (2,974); Manhattan, KS
December 10, 2017*; 1:00 p.m., ACCN Extra		at Georgia Tech	L 52–80	5–4	Hank McCamish Pavilion (718); Atlanta, GA
December 17, 2017*; 2:00 p.m.		at Arkansas	L 57–91	5–5	Bud Walton Arena (1,481); Fayetteville, AR
December 21, 2017*; 4:30 p.m., ESPN3		San Francisco	W 56–54	6–5	College Park Center (1,937); Arlington, TX
Sun Belt regular season
December 29, 2017; 2:30 p.m.		at Coastal Carolina	L 76–89	6–6 (0–1)	HTC Center (293); Conway, SC
December 31, 2017; 11:00 a.m.		at Appalachian State	W 64–60	7–6 (1–1)	Holmes Center (275); Boone, NC
January 4, 2018; 5:00 p.m., ESPN3		Troy	W 76–57	8–6 (2–1)	College Park Center (1,868); Arlington, TX
January 6, 2018; 2:00 p.m., ESPN3		South Alabama	L 63–76	8–7 (2–2)	College Park Center (1,914); Arlington, TX
January 11, 2018; 5:00 p.m.		at Little Rock	L 57–59	8–8 (2–3)	Jack Stephens Center (2,091); Little Rock, AR
January 13, 2018; 3:00 p.m.		at Arkansas State	L 80–85	8–9 (2–4)	First National Bank Arena (791); Jonesboro, AR
January 18, 2018; 5:00 p.m., ESPN3		Louisiana	W 63–61	9–9 (3–4)	College Park Center (2,384); Arlington, TX
January 20, 2018; 2:00 p.m., ESPN3		Louisiana–Monroe	W 70–61	10–9 (4–4)	College Park Center; Arlington, TX
January 25, 2018; 4:00 p.m., ESPN3		at Georgia State	W 81–76 ^{OT}	11–9 (5–4)	GSU Sports Arena (323); Atlanta, GA
January 27, 2018; 1:00 p.m.		at Georgia Southern	L 68–73	11–10 (5–5)	Hanner Fieldhouse (343); Statesboro, GA
February 1, 2018; 5:00 p.m., ESPN3		Appalachian State	W 49–48	13–9 (6–5)	College Park Center (2,330); Arlington, TX
February 3, 2018; 2:00 p.m., ESPN3		Coastal Carolina	W 65–63	13–10 (7–5)	College Park Center; Arlington, TX
February 10, 2018; 2:00 p.m., ESPN3		Texas State	W 61–59 ^{OT}	14–10 (8–5)	College Park Center (2,602); Arlington, TX
February 15, 2018; 5:00 p.m.		at Louisiana–Monroe	W 80–53	15–10 (9–5)	Fant–Ewing Coliseum (1,439); Monroe, LA
February 17, 2018; 4:00 p.m., ESPN3		at Louisiana	W 38–34	16–10 (10–5)	Cajundome (733); Lafayette, LA
February 22, 2018; 11:30 a.m., ESPN3		Georgia Southern	W 70–49	17–10 (11–5)	College Park Center (5,590); Arlington, TX
February 24, 2018; 2:00 p.m., ESPN3		Georgia State	W 62–57	18–10 (12–5)	College Park Center; Arlington, TX
March 3, 2018; 2:00 p.m.		at Texas State	L 58–75	18–11 (12–6)	Strahan Coliseum (1,699); San Marcos, TX
Sun Belt women's tournament
March 8, 2018; 7:30 p.m., ESPN3	(3)	vs. (6) Louisiana; Quarterfinals	L 48–54	18–12	Lakefront Arena (854); New Orleans, LA
*Non-conference game. ^{#}Rankings from AP poll. (#) Tournament seedings in parentheses. All times are in Central.

== Rankings ==
Regular-season polls
Poll	Pre- season	Week 2	Week 3	Week 4	Week 5	Week 6	Week 7	Week 8	Week 9	Week 10	Week 11	Week 12	Week 13	Week 14	Week 15	Week 16	Week 17	Week 18	Week 19	Final
AP																				N/A
Coaches	RV	N/A	RV	RV																

Legend
	Increase in ranking
	Decrease in ranking
	No change
(RV)	Received votes
(NR)	Not ranked previous week

== See also ==
- 2017–18 UT Arlington Mavericks men's basketball team
