= 2017–18 South Alabama Jaguars women's basketball team =

American college basketball season

2017–18 South Alabama Jaguars women's basketball

WBI, Semifinals
- Conference: Sun Belt Conference
- Record: 21–13 (11–7 Sun Belt)
- Head coach: Terry Fowler (5th season)
- Assistant coaches: Yolisha Jackson; Dan Presel; Rachel Travis
- Home arena: Mitchell Center

2017–18 Sun Belt Conference women's basketball standings
	Conf.				Overall
Team	W		L	PCT	W		L	PCT
Little Rock †	17	–	1	.944	23	–	10	.697
Texas State	14	–	4	.778	23	–	10	.697
UT Arlington	12	–	6	.667	18	–	12	.600
Troy	12	–	6	.667	18	–	13	.581
South Alabama	11	–	7	.611	21	–	13	.618
Coastal Carolina	10	–	8	.556	17	–	14	.548
Louisiana	10	–	8	.556	17	–	16	.515
Arkansas State	10	–	8	.556	15	–	15	.500
Appalachian State	5	–	13	.278	8	–	23	.258
Georgia State	4	–	14	.222	8	–	22	.267
Georgia Southern	2	–	16	.111	5	–	25	.167
Louisiana–Monroe	1	–	17	.056	4	–	26	.133
† 2018 Sun Belt tournament winner

The 2017–18 South Alabama Jaguars women's basketball team represented the University of South Alabama during the 2017–18 NCAA Division I women's basketball season. The Jaguars were led by fifth year head coach Terry Fowler and played their home games at the Mitchell Center as members in the Sun Belt Conference. They finished the season 21–13, 11–7 in Sun Belt play to finish in fifth place. They advanced to the second round of the Sun Belt women's tournament where they lost to Troy. They accepted a bid to the Women's Basketball Invitational and advanced to the semifinals but lost to Yale in overtime.

== Previous season ==
They finished the season 11–20, 5–13 in Sun Belt play to finish in tenth place. They advanced to the quarterfinals of the Sun Belt women's tournament where they lost to Texas–Arlington.

== Roster ==
2017–18 South Alabama Jaguars women's basketball team
Players
Coaches

Pos.	#	Name	Height	Year	Previous school	Hometown
G	0	Candice Williams	5 ft 6 in (1.68 m)	RS Sr	St. Francis HS; James Madison	Alpharetta, GA
G	2	Shaforia Kines	5 ft 7 in (1.7 m)	So	Huffman HS	Birmingham, AL
G	3	Jayla Morrow	5 ft 7 in (1.7 m)	Fr	Wenonah HS	Birmingham, AL
G	4	Christen Carter	5 ft 10 in (1.78 m)	RS So	Bolles School	Jacksonville, FL
G	5	Alexis Sykes	5 ft 7 in (1.7 m)	Fr	Nazareth Regional HS	Brooklyn, NY
G	14	Savannah Jones	6 ft 1 in (1.85 m)	RS Fr	St. Martin HS	Ocean Springs, MS
F	15	LaNeetra Guillory	6 ft 1 in (1.85 m)	Sr	Pearland HS	Pearland, TX
G	21	Casey Ferguson	5 ft 10 in (1.78 m)	Fr	D'Iberville HS	Biloxi, MS
G	22	Devyn Lowe	5 ft 6 in (1.68 m)	Fr	Woodstock HS	Woodstock, GA
F	24	Erin Autio	6 ft 0 in (1.83 m)	RS Sr	St. Michael-Albertville HS	St. Michael, MN
F	25	Kennedi Centers	6 ft 2 in (1.88 m)	So	Samuel Clemens HS	New Braunfels, TX
G	30	Genesis Perrymond	5 ft 8 in (1.73 m)	RS Sr	Parkview HS	Lilburn, GA
C	34	Chyna Ellis	6 ft 2 in (1.88 m)	Sr	Arlington HS	Cordova, TN
F/C	35	Antoinette Lewis	6 ft 1 in (1.85 m)	Fr	Harding Academy	Memphis, TN
F/C	44	India Hall	6 ft 2 in (1.88 m)	Jr	Brentwood Academy	Antioch, TN

Head coach

- Terry Fowler (Lane College)

Assistant coach(es)

- Yolisha Jackson (Jacksonville)
- Dan Presel (Spring Hill)
- Rachel Travis (Northwest)

Legend

- (C) Team captain
- (S) Suspended
- (I) Ineligible
- (W) Walk-on
- Injured
- Current redshirt

Roster
Last update: January 13, 2018

== Schedule ==
Date time, TV	Rank^{#}	Opponent^{#}	Result	Record	Site (attendance) city, state
Exhibition
11/02/2017*; 7:05 pm		Faulkner	W 88–48		Mitchell Center (384); Mobile, AL
11/05/2017*; 7:00 pm		at Tulane	L 51–65		Devlin Fieldhouse (465); New Orleans, LA
Non-conference regular season
11/10/2017*; 7:35 pm		Georgia Southwestern	W 73–42	1–0	Mitchell Center (427); Mobile, AL
11/17/2017*; 6:00 pm, ACCN Extra		at NC State	L 50–71	1–1	Reynolds Coliseum (1,997); Raleigh, NC
11/19/2017*; 2:00 pm, ACCN Extra		at North Carolina	W 85–84	2–1	Carmichael Arena (2,380); Chapel Hill, NC
11/24/2017*; 7:05 pm		New Orleans	W 67–45	3–1	Mitchell Center (291); Mobile, AL
11/28/2017*; 7:00 pm		at Alabama State	W 59–47	4–1	Dunn–Oliver Acadome (268); Montgomery, AL
11/30/2017*; 6:00 pm		at Southern Miss	W 78–57	5–1	Reed Green Coliseum (1,243); Hattiesburg, MS
12/03/2017*; 1:05 pm		Jacksonville	L 58–60	5–2	Mitchell Center (178); Mobile, AL
12/09/2017*; 1:00 pm		at Ole Miss	L 59–66	5–3	The Pavilion at Ole Miss (873); Oxford, MS
12/11/2017*; 7:05 pm		Southern	W 69–65	6–3	Mitchell Center (221); Mobile, AL
12/16/2017*; 1:05 pm		Central Arkansas	W 64–43	7–3	Mitchell Center (1,901); Mobile, AL
12/21/2017*; 1:05 pm		UAB	L 66–78	7–4	Mitchell Center (242); Mobile, AL
Sun Belt regular season
12/29/2017; 5:05 pm		Georgia State	W 88–52	8–4 (1–0)	Mitchell Center (1,788); Mobile, AL
12/31/2017; 1:05 pm		Georgia Southern	W 79–52	9–4 (2–0)	Mitchell Center (1,612); Mobile, AL
01/04/2018; 5:30 pm		at Texas State	L 63–78	9–5 (2–1)	Strahan Coliseum (1,407); San Marcos, TX
01/06/2018; 2:00 pm, ESPN3		at Texas–Arlington	W 76–63	10–5 (3–1)	College Park Center (1,914); Arlington, TX
01/13/2018; 1:05 pm		Troy	W 79–68	11–5 (4–1)	Mitchell Center (3,014); Mobile, AL
01/18/2018; 5:05 pm		Coastal Carolina	W 68–62	12–5 (5–1)	Mitchell Center (2,098); Mobile, AL
01/20/2018; 1:05 pm		Appalachian State	W 54–52	13–5 (6–1)	Mitchell Center (3,877); Mobile, AL
01/25/2018; 5:00 pm		at Louisiana	W 72–57	14–5 (7–1)	Cajundome (590); Lafayette, LA
01/27/2018; 12:00 pm		at Louisiana–Monroe	W 67–60	15–5 (8–1)	Fant–Ewing Coliseum (1,635); Monroe, LA
02/03/2018; 2:00 pm, ESPN3		at Troy	L 71–82	15–6 (8–2)	Trojan Arena (2,176); Troy, AL
02/08/2018; 11:00 am		Little Rock	L 35–47	15–7 (8–3)	Mitchell Center (2,484); Mobile, AL
02/10/2018; 1:05 pm		Arkansas State	L 60–75	15–8 (8–4)	Mitchell Center (1,983); Mobile, AL
02/15/2018; 4:00 pm		at Appalachian State	L 56–57 ^{OT}	15–9 (8–5)	Holmes Center (278); Boone, NC
02/17/2018; 12:00 pm, ESPN3		at Coastal Carolina	L 57–71	15–10 (8–6)	HTC Center (357); Conway, SC
02/22/2018; 5:05 pm		Louisiana–Monroe	W 72–57	16–10 (9–6)	Mitchell Center (2,011); Mobile, AL
02/24/2018; 5:05 pm		Louisiana	L 56–59	16–11 (9–7)	Mitchell Center (1,946); Mobile, AL
03/01/2018; 4:00 pm		at Georgia Southern	W 81–74	17–11 (10–7)	Hanner Fieldhouse (139); Statesboro, GA
03/03/2018; 11:00 am, ESPN3		at Georgia State	W 70–69	18–11 (11–7)	GSU Sports Arena (448); Atlanta, GA
Sun Belt Women's Tournament
03/06/2018; 2:00 pm, ESPN3	(5)	vs. (12) Louisiana–Monroe; First Round	W 80–54	19–11	Lakefront Arena; New Orleans, LA
03/08/2018; 2:00 pm, ESPN3	(5)	vs. (4) Troy; Quarterfinals	L 79–82	19–12	Lakefront Arena (967); New Orleans, LA
WBI
03/15/2018*; 7:00 pm		Stetson; First Round	W 49–33	20–12	Mitchell Center (707); Mobile, AL
03/19/2018*; 7:00 pm		Furman; Quarterfinals	W 54–53	21–12	Mitchell Center (802); Mobile, AL
03/24/2018*; 4:00 pm		at Yale; Semifinals	L 74–76 ^{OT}	21–13	John J. Lee Amphitheater (350); New Haven, CT
*Non-conference game. ^{#}Rankings from AP Poll. (#) Tournament seedings in parentheses. All times are in Eastern Time.

== Rankings ==
2017–18 NCAA Division I women's basketball rankings

Regular season polls
Poll	Pre- Season	Week 2	Week 3	Week 4	Week 5	Week 6	Week 7	Week 8	Week 9	Week 10	Week 11	Week 12	Week 13	Week 14	Week 15	Week 16	Week 17	Week 18	Week 19	Final
AP																				N/A
Coaches		N/A							RV											

Legend
	Increase in ranking
	Decrease in ranking
	No change
(RV)	Received votes
(NR)	Not ranked

== See also ==
- 2017–18 South Alabama Jaguars men's basketball team
