= 2017–18 Arkansas State Red Wolves women's basketball team =

Intercollegiate basketball season

2017–18 Arkansas State Red Wolves women's basketball
- Conference: Sun Belt Conference
- Record: 15–15 (10–8 Sun Belt)
- Head coach: Brian Boyer (18th season)
- Assistant coaches: Autumn Rademacher; Deidra Johnson; Aundrea Gamble
- Home arena: First National Bank Arena

2017–18 Sun Belt Conference women's basketball standings
	Conf.				Overall
Team	W		L	PCT	W		L	PCT
Little Rock †	17	–	1	.944	23	–	10	.697
Texas State	14	–	4	.778	23	–	10	.697
UT Arlington	12	–	6	.667	18	–	12	.600
Troy	12	–	6	.667	18	–	13	.581
South Alabama	11	–	7	.611	21	–	13	.618
Coastal Carolina	10	–	8	.556	17	–	14	.548
Louisiana	10	–	8	.556	17	–	16	.515
Arkansas State	10	–	8	.556	15	–	15	.500
Appalachian State	5	–	13	.278	8	–	23	.258
Georgia State	4	–	14	.222	8	–	22	.267
Georgia Southern	2	–	16	.111	5	–	25	.167
Louisiana–Monroe	1	–	17	.056	4	–	26	.133
† 2018 Sun Belt tournament winner

The 2017–18 Arkansas State Red Wolves women's basketball team represented Arkansas State University during the 2017–18 NCAA Division I women's basketball season. The Red Wolves, led by eighteenth year head coach Brian Boyer, played their home games at First National Bank Arena in Jonesboro, Arkansas as members of the Sun Belt Conference. They finished the season 15–15, 10–8 in Sun Belt play to finish in a 3-way tie for sixth place. They lost in the first round of the Sun Belt women's tournament to Appalachian State.

== Previous season ==
They finished the season 7–25, 4–14 in Sun Belt play to finish in eleventh place. They advanced to the quarterfinals of the Sun Belt women's tournament where they lost to Troy.

== Roster ==
2017–18 Arkansas State Red Wolves women's basketball team
Players
Coaches

Pos.	#	Name	Height	Year	Previous school	Hometown
G	0	Jada Ford	5 ft 9 in (1.75 m)	So	Muskogee HS	Muskogee, OK
F	1	Lauren Bradshaw	6 ft 2 in (1.88 m)	Sr	Mesquite Horn HS	Mesquite, TX
G	2	Starr Taylor	5 ft 6 in (1.68 m)	So	Jonesboro HS	Jonesboro, AR
G	3	Morgan Wallace	5 ft 10 in (1.78 m)	Fr	Pulaski Academy	Little Rock, AR
G	5	Payton Tennison	5 ft 11 in (1.8 m)	So	Valley Springs HS	Valley Springs, AR
G	10	Akasha Westbrook	5 ft 10 in (1.78 m)	RS Jr	Malvern HS	Malvern, AR
F	11	Lycia Peevy	6 ft 2 in (1.88 m)	Fr	Paris HS	Paris, AR
F	13	Kayla Williams (redshirt)	6 ft 1 in (1.85 m)	So	Overton HS; Wichita State	Memphis, TN
G	14	Ashley Clayborn	5 ft 9 in (1.75 m)	Jr	Hot Springs HS; Tyler JC	Hot Springs, AR
G	20	Tayton Hopkins	5 ft 8 in (1.73 m)	RS Fr	Homeschool; Farmington HS	Farmington, AR
G	22	Maggie Mahan	5 ft 9 in (1.75 m)	Fr	Nemo Vista HS	Center Ridge, AR
F	32	Tahlon Hopkins	5 ft 11 in (1.8 m)	So	Homeschool; Farmington HS	Farmington, AR
F	33	Ogo Obinabo	6 ft 2 in (1.88 m)	Sr	Plano HS	Plano, TX
G/F	35	Peyton Martin	5 ft 11 in (1.8 m)	Fr	Watson Chapel HS	Pine Bluff, AR
F	50	Madison Heckert	6 ft 4 in (1.93 m)	So	West Carroll HS	Atwood, TN

Head coach

- Brian Boyer (Missouri Western)

Assistant coach(es)

- Autumn Rademacher (Detroit Mercy)
- Deidra Johnson (Oklahoma State)
- Aundrea Gamble (Arkansas State)

Legend

- (C) Team captain
- (S) Suspended
- (I) Ineligible
- (W) Walk-on
- Injured
- Current redshirt

Roster
Last update: January 12, 2018

== Schedule ==
Date time, TV	Rank^{#}	Opponent^{#}	Result	Record	Site (attendance) city, state
Exhibition
11/02/2017*; 7:00 pm		Arkansas–Monticello	W 83–52		First National Bank Arena (855); Jonesboro, AR
11/07/2017*; 7:00 pm		Lyon College	W 73–63		First National Bank Arena (691); Jonesboro, AR
Non-conference regular season
11/11/2017*; 1:00 pm		at Indiana	L 51–93	0–1	Simon Skjodt Assembly Hall (2,790); Bloomington, IN
11/14/2017*; 6:00 pm		at Florida	W 70–69	1–1	O'Connell Center (1,143); Gainesville, FL
11/17/2017*; 6:00 pm		at No. 22 South Florida	L 55–98	1–2	USF Sun Dome (2,276); Tampa, FL
11/21/2017*; 7:00 pm		UT Martin	W 84–73	2–2	First National Bank Arena (784); Jonesboro, AR
11/25/2017*; 5:00 pm, ACCN Extra		at Pittsburgh	L 47–87	2–3	Peterson Events Center (629); Pittsburgh, PA
11/30/2017*; 7:00 pm		Tennessee State	W 68–62	3–3	First National Bank Arena (718); Jonesboro, AR
12/02/2017*; 3:00 pm		at Ole Miss	L 48–74	3–4	The Pavilion at Ole Miss (6,297); Oxford, MS
12/05/2017*; 5:00 pm		UTEP	W 76–73	4–4	First National Bank Arena; Jonesboro, AR
12/14/2017*; 11:30 am		Belmont	L 52–83	4–5	First National Bank Arena (4,374); Jonesboro, AR
12/16/2017*; 3:00 pm		Grambling State	W 76–56	5–5	First National Bank Arena (587); Jonesboro, AR
12/22/2017*; 1:00 pm		at Tulsa	L 58–68	5–6	Reynolds Center (506); Tulsa, OK
Sun Belt regular season
12/29/2017; 5:00 pm		Louisiana–Monroe	W 78–62	6–6 (1–0)	First National Bank Arena; Jonesboro, AR
12/31/2017; 1:00 pm		Louisiana	L 75–77	6–7 (1–1)	First National Bank Arena; Jonesboro, AR
01/04/2018; 4:00 pm		at Georgia Southern	W 71–62	7–7 (2–1)	Hanner Fieldhouse (135); Statesboro, GA
01/06/2018; 11:00 am, ESPN3		at Georgia State	W 75–58	8–7 (3–1)	GSU Sports Arena (367); Atlanta, GA
01/11/2018; 5:00 pm		Texas State	L 55–67	8–8 (3–2)	First National Bank Arena (1,275); Jonesboro, AR
01/13/2018; 3:00 pm		Texas–Arlington	W 85–80	9–8 (4–2)	First National Bank Arena (791); Jonesboro, AR
01/20/2018; 3:00 pm		at Little Rock	L 43–53	9–9 (4–3)	Jack Stephens Center (5,113); Little Rock, AR
01/25/2018; 4:00 pm		at Coastal Carolina	W 70–63	10–9 (5–3)	HTC Center (260); Conway, SC
01/27/2018; 12:00 pm, ESPN3		at Appalachian State	L 66–68	10–10 (5–4)	Holmes Center (319); Boone, NC
02/01/2018; 5:00 pm, ESPN3		Georgia State	W 76–63	11–10 (6–4)	First National Bank Arena; Jonesboro, AR
02/03/2018; 3:00 pm, ESPN3		Georgia Southern	W 69–48	12–10 (7–4)	First National Bank Arena (824); Jonesboro, AR
02/08/2018; 5:00 pm, ESPN3		at Troy	L 78–95	12–11 (7–5)	Trojan Arena (875); Troy, AL
02/10/2018; 1:05 pm		at South Alabama	W 75–60	13–11 (8–5)	Mitchell Center (1,983); Mobile, AL
02/17/2018; 3:00 pm, ESPN3		Little Rock	L 58–65	13–12 (8–6)	First National Bank Arena (765); Jonesboro, AR
02/22/2018; 5:00 pm, ESPN3		Appalachian State	W 69–52	14–12 (9–6)	First National Bank Arena; Jonesboro, AR
02/24/2018; 3:00 pm		Coastal Carolina	L 65–73	14–13 (9–7)	First National Bank Arena (599); Jonesboro, AR
03/01/2018; 5:00 pm		at Louisiana	L 53–60	15–13 (9–8)	Cajundome (925); Lafayette, LA
03/03/2018; 12:00 pm		at Louisiana–Monroe	W 80–73	15–14 (10–8)	Fant–Ewing Coliseum (2,083); Monroe, LA
Sun Belt Women's Tournament
03/06/2018; 11:30 am, ESPN3	(8)	vs. (9) Appalachian State; First Round	L 68–79	15–15	Lakefront Arena; New Orleans, LA
*Non-conference game. ^{#}Rankings from AP Poll. (#) Tournament seedings in parentheses. All times are in Eastern Time.

== See also ==
2017–18 Arkansas State Red Wolves men's basketball team
