= 2017–18 Little Rock Trojans women's basketball team =

Intercollegiate basketball season

2017–18 Little Rock Trojans women's basketball
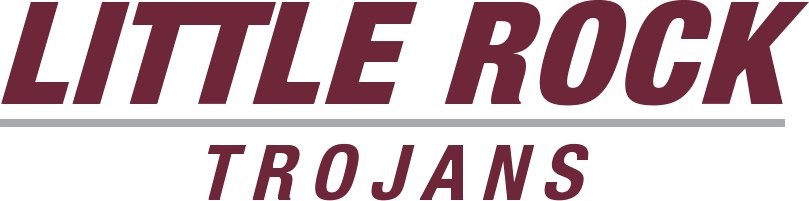

Sun Belt Regular Season and Tournament Champions

NCAA Women's Tournament, first round
- Conference: Sun Belt Conference
- Record: 23–10 (17–1 Sun Belt)
- Head coach: Joe Foley (15th season)
- Assistant coaches: Robert Dallimore; Alicia Cash; Steve Wiedower
- Home arena: Jack Stephens Center

2017–18 Sun Belt Conference women's basketball standings
	Conf.				Overall
Team	W		L	PCT	W		L	PCT
Little Rock †	17	–	1	.944	23	–	10	.697
Texas State	14	–	4	.778	23	–	10	.697
UT Arlington	12	–	6	.667	18	–	12	.600
Troy	12	–	6	.667	18	–	13	.581
South Alabama	11	–	7	.611	21	–	13	.618
Coastal Carolina	10	–	8	.556	17	–	14	.548
Louisiana	10	–	8	.556	17	–	16	.515
Arkansas State	10	–	8	.556	15	–	15	.500
Appalachian State	5	–	13	.278	8	–	23	.258
Georgia State	4	–	14	.222	8	–	22	.267
Georgia Southern	2	–	16	.111	5	–	25	.167
Louisiana–Monroe	1	–	17	.056	4	–	26	.133
† 2018 Sun Belt tournament winner

The 2017–18 Little Rock Trojans women's basketball team represented the University of Arkansas at Little Rock during the 2017–18 NCAA Division I women's basketball season. The Trojans, led by fifteenth year head coach Joe Foley, played their home games at the Jack Stephens Center and were members of the Sun Belt Conference. They finished the season 23–10, 17–1 in Sun Belt play to win the Sun Belt regular season and tournament titles to earn an automatic trip to the NCAA women's tournament, where they lost in the first round to Florida State.

== Previous season ==
They finished the season 25–9, 17–1 in Sun Belt play to win the Sun Belt regular season title. They advanced to the semifinals of the Sun Belt women's tournament where they lost to Louisiana–Lafayette. They received an automatic bid to the WNIT, where they defeated Southern Miss in the first round before losing to Alabama in the second round.

== Roster ==
2017–18 Little Rock Trojans women's basketball team
Players
Coaches

Pos.	#	Name	Height	Year	Previous school	Hometown
F	0	Ronjanae DeGray	6 ft 0 in (1.83 m)	Jr	Mount Juliet HS	Odessa, TX
G	2	Monique Townson	5 ft 6 in (1.68 m)	Sr	Staley HS	Kansas City, MO
G	3	Terrion Moore	5 ft 8 in (1.73 m)	Fr	Leavenworth HS	Kansas City, MO
G	4	Kira Shepard	5 ft 7 in (1.7 m)	Jr	Northside HS	Fort Smith, AR
G	5	Tori Lasker	5 ft 7 in (1.7 m)	Fr	Mayflower HS	Mayflower, AR
G	12	Sydney Chastain	5 ft 7 in (1.7 m)	So	Westmoore HS	Oklahoma City, OK
G	15	Kiara Scott	5 ft 11 in (1.8 m)	Jr	A. J. Ellender HS	Houma, LA
G	20	Keyara Jones	5 ft 6 in (1.68 m)	Fr	Heidelberg HS	Heidelberg, MS
F	22	Yanina Inkina	6 ft 2 in (1.88 m)	Jr	South Plains	Minsk, Belarus
G	23	Kyra Collier	5 ft 9 in (1.75 m)	So	North Little Rock HS	North Little Rock, AR
F	25	Anna Hurlburt	6 ft 1 in (1.85 m)	So	Southlake Carroll HS	Southlake, TX
G/F	30	Raeyana DeGray	5 ft 11 in (1.8 m)	Jr	Mount Juliet HS	Odessa, TX
F	33	Keanna Keys	6 ft 1 in (1.85 m)	RS Sr	Sumrall HS	Sumrall, MS
F	35	Teal Battle	6 ft 1 in (1.85 m)	Fr	White Station HS	Millington, TN

Head coach

- Joe Foley (Central Arkansas)

Assistant coach(es)

- Robert Dallimore (LSU)
- Alicia Cash (Little Rock)
- Steve Wiedower (Arkansas State)

Legend

- (C) Team captain
- (S) Suspended
- (I) Ineligible
- (W) Walk-on
- Injured
- Current redshirt

Roster
Last update: January 12, 2018

== Schedule ==
Date time, TV	Rank^{#}	Opponent^{#}	Result	Record	Site (attendance) city, state
Non-conference regular season
11/12/2017*; 3:00 pm		Memphis	W 86–57	1–0	Jack Stephens Center (1,386); Little Rock, AR
11/15/2017*; 11:30 am		Tulsa	L 61–74	1–1	Jack Stephens Center (2,138); Little Rock, AR
11/22/2017*; 6:00 pm		at No. 19 Texas A&M	L 49–66	1–2	Reed Arena (3,123); College Station, TX
11/24/2017*; 2:00 pm		at Rice	L 51–58	1–3	Tudor Fieldhouse (336); Houston, TX
11/28/2017*; 6:30 pm		Oklahoma	W 68–56	2–3	Jack Stephens Center (1,306); Little Rock, AR
12/01/2017*; 7:00 pm		at Saint Louis	L 45–48	2–4	Chaifetz Arena (778); St. Louis, MO
12/04/2017*; 6:30 pm		Missouri State	W 63–51	3–4	Jack Stephens Center (1,037); Little Rock, AR
12/07/2017*; 6:30 pm		Louisiana Tech	L 49–58	3–5	Jack Stephens Center (1,141); Little Rock, AR
12/10/2017*; 2:00 pm		at No. 6 Mississippi State	L 48–86	3–6	Humphrey Coliseum (5,010); Starkville, MS
12/16/2017*; 2:00 pm, ESPN3		at Kansas State	L 51–66	3–7	Bramlage Coliseum (3,254); Manhattan, KS
12/20/2017*; 6:30 pm		LSU	L 37–56	3–8	Jack Stephens Center (1,724); Little Rock, AR
Sun Belt Conference regular season
12/29/2017; 5:00 pm		Louisiana	W 78–43	4–8 (1–0)	Jack Stephens Center (1,688); Little Rock, AR
12/31/2017; 2:00 pm		Louisiana–Monroe	W 57–37	5–8 (2–0)	Jack Stephens Center (1,632); Little Rock, AR
01/04/2018; 4:00 pm, ESPN3		at Georgia State	W 65–50	6–8 (3–0)	GSU Sports Arena (314); Atlanta, GA
01/06/2018; 1:00 pm		at Georgia Southern	W 64–34	7–8 (4–0)	Hanner Fieldhouse (211); Statesboro, GA
01/11/2018; 5:00 pm		Texas–Arlington	W 59–57	8–8 (5–0)	Jack Stephens Center (2,091); Little Rock, AR
01/13/2018; 3:00 pm		Texas State	W 63–48	9–8 (6–0)	Jack Stephens Center (2,165); Little Rock, AR
01/20/2018; 3:00 pm		Arkansas State	W 53–43	10–8 (7–0)	Jack Stephens Center (5,113); Little Rock, AR
01/25/2018; 4:00 pm, ESPN3		at Appalachian State	W 52–40	11–8 (8–0)	Holmes Center (297); Boone, NC
01/27/2018; 12:00 pm		at Coastal Carolina	W 51–49	12–8 (9–0)	HTC Center (297); Conway, NC
02/01/2018; 5:00 pm		Georgia Southern	W 92–52	13–8 (10–0)	Jack Stephens Center (2,084); Little Rock, AR
02/03/2018; 3:00 pm		Georgia State	W 54–47	14–8 (11–0)	Jack Stephens Center (2,373); Little Rock, AR
02/08/2018; 11:00 am		at South Alabama	W 47–35	15–8 (12–0)	Mitchell Center (2,484); Mobile, AL
02/10/2018; 2:00 pm, ESPN3		at Troy	L 70–76 ^{OT}	15–9 (12–1)	Trojan Arena (1,046); Troy, AL
02/17/2018; 3:00 pm, ESPN3		at Arkansas State	W 64–58	16–9 (13–1)	First National Bank Arena (765); Jonesboro, AR
02/22/2018; 5:00 pm		Coastal Carolina	W 53–44	17–9 (14–1)	Jack Stephens Center (1,288); Little Rock, AR
02/24/2018; 3:00 pm		Appalachian State	W 61–35	18–9 (15–1)	Jack Stephens Center (1,794); Little Rock, AR
03/01/2018; 5:00 pm		at Louisiana–Monroe	W 71–47	19–9 (16–1)	Fant–Ewing Coliseum (1,537); Monroe, LA
03/03/2018; 4:00 pm		at Louisiana	W 73–62 ^{OT}	20–9 (17–1)	Cajundome (691); Lafayette, LA
Sun Belt Women's Tournament
03/08/2018; 11:30 am, ESPN3	(1)	vs. (9) Appalachian State; Quarterfinals	W 66–34	21–9	Lakefront Arena; New Orleans, LA
03/10/2018; 5:00 pm, ESPN3	(1)	vs. (4) Troy; Semifinals	W 66–63	22–9	Lakefront Arena (898); New Orleans, LA
03/11/2018; 6:00 pm, ESPN3	(1)	vs. (2) Texas State; Championship Game	W 54–53	23–9	Lakefront Arena (1,214); New Orleans, LA
NCAA Women's Tournament
03/17/2018*; 11:00 am, ESPN2	(14 A)	at (3 A) No. 11 Florida State; First Round	L 49–91	23–10	Donald L. Tucker Civic Center; Tallahassee, FL
*Non-conference game. ^{#}Rankings from AP Poll. (#) Tournament seedings in parentheses. A=Albany Region. All times are in Central Time.

== Rankings ==
2017–18 NCAA Division I women's basketball rankings

Regular season polls
Poll	Pre- Season	Week 2	Week 3	Week 4	Week 5	Week 6	Week 7	Week 8	Week 9	Week 10	Week 11	Week 12	Week 13	Week 14	Week 15	Week 16	Week 17	Week 18	Week 19	Final
AP																				N/A
Coaches																		RV	RV	RV

Legend
	Increase in ranking
	Decrease in ranking
	No change
(RV)	Received votes
(NR)	Not ranked

== See also ==
- 2017–18 Little Rock Trojans men's basketball team
