= 2017–18 Troy Trojans women's basketball team =

Intercollegiate basketball season

2017–18 Troy Trojans women's basketball
- Conference: Sun Belt Conference
- Record: 18–13 (12–6 Sun Belt)
- Head coach: Chanda Rigby (6th season)
- Assistant coaches: Jennifer Graf; Courtney Simmons; Neil Harrow
- Home arena: Trojan Arena

2017–18 Sun Belt Conference women's basketball standings
	Conf.				Overall
Team	W		L	PCT	W		L	PCT
Little Rock †	17	–	1	.944	23	–	10	.697
Texas State	14	–	4	.778	23	–	10	.697
UT Arlington	12	–	6	.667	18	–	12	.600
Troy	12	–	6	.667	18	–	13	.581
South Alabama	11	–	7	.611	21	–	13	.618
Coastal Carolina	10	–	8	.556	17	–	14	.548
Louisiana	10	–	8	.556	17	–	16	.515
Arkansas State	10	–	8	.556	15	–	15	.500
Appalachian State	5	–	13	.278	8	–	23	.258
Georgia State	4	–	14	.222	8	–	22	.267
Georgia Southern	2	–	16	.111	5	–	25	.167
Louisiana–Monroe	1	–	17	.056	4	–	26	.133
† 2018 Sun Belt tournament winner

The 2017–18 Troy Trojans women's basketball team represented Troy University during the 2017–18 NCAA Division I women's basketball season. The Trojans, led by sixth year head coach Chanda Rigby, played their home games at Trojan Arena and were members of the Sun Belt Conference. They finished the season 18–13, 12–6 in Sun Belt play to finish in a tie for third place. They advanced to the semifinals of the Sun Belt Tournament, where they lost to Little Rock.

== Previous season ==
They finished the season 22–11, 12–6 in Sun Belt play to finish in third place. They defeat Arkansas State, Texas–Arlington and Louisiana–Lafayette to become champions of the Sun Belt Tournament to earn an automatic trip to the NCAA women's tournament. They lost in the first round to Mississippi State.

== Roster ==
2017–18 Troy Trojans women's basketball team
Players
Coaches

Pos.	#	Name	Height	Year	Previous school	Hometown
G	1	Kayla Robinson	5 ft 5 in (1.65 m)	So	Effingham County HS	Clyo, GA
G	3	Amanda Mendoza	5 ft 3 in (1.6 m)	Sr	Miami Sr. HS; St. Petersburg College	Miami, FL
G	4	Jasmine Robinson	5 ft 6 in (1.68 m)	Fr	Academy of Richmond County	Augusta, GA
G	10	Janiah Sandifer	5 ft 7 in (1.7 m)	Fr	Pearl-Cohn	Nashville, TN
G	11	Jasmine LeBlanc (redshirt)	5 ft 10 in (1.78 m)	Jr	Breaux Bridge HS; Louisiana Tech	Breaux Bridge, LA
G	12	Harriet Winchester	5 ft 11 in (1.8 m)	So	Keith HS	Safrord, AL
G	21	Jasmine Sanders	6 ft 0 in (1.83 m)	Fr	Garinger HS	Charlotte, NC
F	22	Amahni Upshaw	6 ft 1 in (1.85 m)	Jr	Brantley HS	Brantley, AL
G	23	Shaterrika O'Neal	5 ft 8 in (1.73 m)	Jr	Winter Haven HS; Gulf Coast State	Winter Haven, FL
F	24	Sky'Lynn Holmes	6 ft 1 in (1.85 m)	Jr	Pine Tree HS; Tyler JC	Mount Pleasant, TX
C	32	Dajia Williams	6 ft 3 in (1.91 m)	Sr	Gadsden City HS	Gadsden, AL
G	33	Chelsey Gibson	6 ft 0 in (1.83 m)	Sr	Pensacola HS; Marquette	Pensacola, FL
F	40	Amber Rivers	6 ft 2 in (1.88 m)	So	Center Point HS	Birmingham, AL

Head coach

- Chanda Rigby (Southeastern Louisiana)

Assistant coach(es)

- Jennifer Graf (Northwestern State)
- Courtney Simmons (Louisville)
- Neil Harrow (East Central)

Legend

- (C) Team captain
- (S) Suspended
- (I) Ineligible
- (W) Walk-on
- Injured
- Current redshirt

Roster
Last update: January 13, 2018

== Schedule ==
Date time, TV	Rank^{#}	Opponent^{#}	Result	Record	Site (attendance) city, state
Exhibition
11/01/2017*; 5:00 pm		Auburn Montgomery	W 79–54		Trojan Arena; Troy, AL
Non-conference regular season
11/10/2017*; 12:00 pm		Stillman	W 89–62	1–0	Trojan Arena (341); Troy, AL
11/16/2017*; 7:00 pm		at Alabama State	W 93–63	2–0	Dunn–Oliver Acadome (389); Montgomery, AL
11/21/2017*; 2:00 pm		at Ole Miss	L 93–96	2–1	The Pavilion at Ole Miss (817); Oxford, MS
11/27/2017*; 6:00 pm		at Tennessee State	W 95–66	3–1	Gentry Center (438); Nashville, TN
12/01/2017*; 6:00 pm, ESPN3		Jacksonville	W 89–88	4–1	Trojan Arena (438); Troy, AL
12/06/2017*; 6:00 pm		at No. 11 Tennessee	L 69–131	4–2	Thompson–Boling Arena (7,187); Knoxville, TN
12/09/2017*; 2:00 pm, ESPN3		Montevallo	W 130–50	5–2	Trojan Arena (576); Troy, AL
12/14/2017*; 6:30 pm		at Middle Tennessee	L 57–73	5–3	Murphy Center (3,986); Murfreesboro, TN
12/17/2017*; 2:00 pm, ESPN3		at Samford	L 73–80	5–4	Pete Hanna Center (388); Birmingham, AL
12/21/2017*; 2:30 pm		at Tulane; Tulane Classic semifinals	L 75–106	5–5	Devlin Fieldhouse; New Orleans, LA
12/22/2017*; 1:00 pm		vs. Samford; Tulane Classic 3rd place game	L 76–82 ^{OT}	5–6	Devlin Fieldhouse (706); New Orleans, LA
Sun Belt regular season
12/29/2017; 5:00 pm, ESPN3		Georgia Southern	W 88–47	6–6 (1–0)	Trojan Arena (912); Troy, AL
12/31/2017; 1:00 pm, ESPN3		Georgia State	W 90–86	7–6 (2–0)	Trojan Arena (927); Troy, AL
01/04/2018; 5:00 pm, ESPN3		at Texas–Arlington	L 57–76	7–7 (2–1)	College Park Center (1,868); Arlington, TX
01/06/2018; 2:00 pm, ESPN3		at Texas State	L 75–83	7–8 (2–2)	Strahan Coliseum (1,560); San Marcos, TX
01/13/2018; 1:00 pm		at South Alabama	L 68–79	7–9 (2–3)	Mitchell Center (3,014); Mobile, AL
01/20/2018; 2:00 pm, ESPN3		Coastal Carolina	L 92–97	7–10 (2–4)	Trojan Arena (1,691); Troy, AL
01/22/2018; 5:00 pm, ESPN3		Appalachian State	W 81–74	8–10 (3–4)	Trojan Arena (1,069); Troy, AL
01/25/2018; 5:00 pm		at Louisiana–Monroe	W 86–79	9–10 (4–4)	Fant–Ewing Coliseum (1,651); Monroe, LA
01/27/2018; 4:00 pm		at Louisiana	W 62–55	10–10 (5–4)	Cajundome (3,087); Lafayette, LA
02/03/2018; 2:00 pm, ESPN3		South Alabama	W 82–71	11–10 (6–4)	Trojan Arena (2,176); Troy, AL
02/08/2018; 5:00 pm, ESPN3		Arkansas State	W 95–78	12–10 (7–4)	Trojan Arena (875); Troy, AL
02/10/2018; 2:00 pm, ESPN3		Little Rock	W 76–70 ^{OT}	13–10 (8–4)	Trojan Arena (1,046); Troy, AL
02/15/2018; 4:00 pm		at Coastal Carolina	L 71–84	13–11 (8–5)	HTC Center (303); Conway, SC
02/17/2018; 12:00 pm, ESPN3		at Appalachian State	W 93–64	14–11 (9–5)	Holmes Center (582); Boone, NC
02/22/2018; 5:00 pm, ESPN3		Louisiana	W 72–53	15–11 (10–5)	Trojan Arena (1,429); Troy, AL
02/24/2018; 2:00 pm, ESPN3		Louisiana–Monroe	W 94–62	16–11 (11–5)	Trojan Arena (1,359); Troy, AL
03/01/2018; 4:00 pm, ESPN3		at Georgia State	L 78–85	16–12 (11–6)	GSU Sports Arena (398); Atlanta, GA
03/03/2018; 1:00 pm		at Georgia Southern	W 95–80	17–12 (12–6)	Hanner Fieldhouse (453); Statesboro, GA
Sun Belt Women's Tournament
03/08/2018; 2:00 pm, ESPN3	(4)	vs. (5) South Alabama; Quarterfinals	W 82–79	18–12	Lakefront Arena (967); New Orleans, LA
03/10/2018; 5:00 pm, ESPN3	(4)	vs. (1) Little Rock; Semifinals	L 63–66	18–13	Lakefront Arena (898); New Orleans, LA
*Non-conference game. ^{#}Rankings from AP Poll. (#) Tournament seedings in parentheses. All times are in Central Time.

== Rankings ==
2017–18 NCAA Division I women's basketball rankings

+ Regular season polls	Poll	Pre- Season	Week 2	Week 3	Week 4	Week 5	Week 6	Week 7	Week 8	Week 9	Week 10	Week 11	Week 12	Week 13	Week 14	Week 15	Week 16	Week 17	Week 18	Week 19	Final
AP																				N/A	
Coaches		N/A				RV															

Legend
	Increase in ranking
	Decrease in ranking
	No change
(RV)	Received votes
(NR)	Not ranked

== See also ==
- 2017–18 Troy Trojans men's basketball team
