= 2017–18 Louisiana Ragin' Cajuns women's basketball team =

Intercollegiate basketball season

2017–18 Louisiana Ragin' Cajuns women's basketball

Sun Belt tournament, semifinals (L, Texas State 56-62)
- Conference: Sun Belt Conference
- Record: 17–16 (10–8 Sun Belt)
- Head coach: Garry Brodhead (6th season)
- Assistant coaches: Deacon Jones; Amber Gregg; Valerie Huizar
- Home arena: Cajundome

2017–18 Sun Belt Conference women's basketball standings
	Conf.				Overall
Team	W		L	PCT	W		L	PCT
Little Rock †	17	–	1	.944	23	–	10	.697
Texas State	14	–	4	.778	23	–	10	.697
UT Arlington	12	–	6	.667	18	–	12	.600
Troy	12	–	6	.667	18	–	13	.581
South Alabama	11	–	7	.611	21	–	13	.618
Coastal Carolina	10	–	8	.556	17	–	14	.548
Louisiana	10	–	8	.556	17	–	16	.515
Arkansas State	10	–	8	.556	15	–	15	.500
Appalachian State	5	–	13	.278	8	–	23	.258
Georgia State	4	–	14	.222	8	–	22	.267
Georgia Southern	2	–	16	.111	5	–	25	.167
Louisiana–Monroe	1	–	17	.056	4	–	26	.133
† 2018 Sun Belt tournament winner

The 2017–18 Louisiana Ragin' Cajuns women's basketball team represented the University of Louisiana at Lafayette during the 2017–18 NCAA Division I women's basketball season. The Ragin' Cajuns were led by sixth-year head coach Garry Brodhead and played their double-header home games at the Cajundome with the men, and single games at the Earl K. Long Gymnasium, which is located on the university's campus. They were members in the Sun Belt Conference. They finished the season 17–16, 10–8 in Sun Belt play, to finish in a three-way tie for sixth place. They advanced to the semifinals of the Sun Belt women's tournament where they lost to Texas State.

== Previous season ==
The Ragin' Cajuns finished the 2016–17 season 20–11, 11–7 in Sun Belt play, to finish fourth in the conference. They made it to the 2016–17 Sun Belt Conference women's basketball championship game after defeating Louisiana–Monroe, Texas State and Little Rock in the first round, quarterfinals and the semifinals, respectively. They lost in heartbreaking fashion against Troy in the championship by the score of 64–78. The Ragin' Cajuns did not participate in post-season play.

== Offseason ==
=== Departures ===
Name	Number	Pos.	Height	Weight	Year	Hometown	Notes
Jaylyn Gordon	11	G	5'5"		Senior	Edgard, LA	Graduated
Gabby Alexander	22	F	5'11"		Senior	Bogalusa, LA	Graduated
Breionne Cooper	3	C	6'3"		Sophomore	New Orleans, LA	Transferred
Jodi Quinn	15	G/F	5'7"		Junior	St. Martinville, LA	Transferred
Brooke Jolivette	20	G/F	5'10"		Sophomore	Houston, TX	Transferred
Alex Weeks	33	C	6'4"		Sophomore	Shreveport, LA	Transferred

=== Incoming recruits ===
College recruiting information
Name	Hometown	School	Height	Weight	Commit date
Ty'Reonne Doucet; C	Ville Platte, LA	Ville Platte HS (Ville Platte	6 ft 1 in (1.85 m)	N/A	
Ty'Reonne Doucet; C	Recruit ratings: Scout: Rivals: 247Sports: (0)				
Jomyra Mathais; G/F	New Orleans, LA	Landry Walker HS (New Orleans)	5 ft 8 in (1.73 m)	N/A	
Jomyra Mathais; G/F	Recruit ratings: Scout: Rivals: 247Sports: (0)				
Skyler Goodwin; G/F	Baton Rouge, LA	Parkview Baptist HS (Baton Rouge)	5 ft 8 in (1.73 m)	N/A	
Skyler Goodwin; G/F	Recruit ratings: Scout: Rivals: 247Sports: (0)				
Overall recruit ranking:
Note: In many cases, Scout, Rivals, 247Sports, On3, and ESPN may conflict in their listings of height and weight.; In these cases, the average was taken. ESPN grades are on a 100-point scale.; Sources: "Louisiana 2017 Player Commits". ESPN.; "2017 Team Ranking". Rivals.

== Roster ==
2017–18 Louisiana Ragin' Cajuns women's basketball team
Players
Coaches

Pos.	#	Name	Height	Year	Previous school	Hometown
G	0	Kendra Howard	5 ft 6 in (1.68 m)	RS Sr	Cedar Hill HS; San Jacinto College	Dallas, TX
F	1	Kimberly Burton	5 ft 11 in (1.8 m)	So	Red River HS	Shreveport, LA
G	2	Jasmine Thomas	5 ft 7 in (1.7 m)	So	North Caddo HS	Vivian, LA
G	3	Ty'Reonne Doucet	6 ft 1 in (1.85 m)	Fr	Ville Platte HS	Ville Platte, LA
G	4	Malachi-Seraphin Williams	5 ft 7 in (1.7 m)	So	Putnam City North HS	Oklahoma City, OK
G/F	5	Jomyra Mathis	5 ft 8 in (1.73 m)	Fr	Landry Walker HS	New Orleans, LA
G	10	Troi Swain	5 ft 6 in (1.68 m)	Sr	McNeil HS; Trinity Valley CC	Round Rock, TX
G/F	11	Skyler Goodwin	5 ft 8 in (1.73 m)	Fr	Parkview Baptist HS	Baton Rouge, LA
F	21	Nekia Jones	5 ft 11 in (1.8 m)	RS Sr	Ozen HS; Texas	Beaumont, TX
F	32	Simone Fields	6 ft 0 in (1.83 m)	Sr	Converse Judson HS	San Antonio, TX
C	35	Brittney Myles	6 ft 2 in (1.88 m)	So	Fair Park HS	Shreveport, LA
G/F	42	Danyale Bayonne	5 ft 10 in (1.78 m)	RS Fr	Pineville HS	Pineville, LA

Head coach

- Garry Boadhead (Louisiana)

Assistant coach(es)

- Deacon Jones (Louisiana)
- Amber Gregg (Texas–San Antonio)
- Valerie Huizar (LSU–Shreveport)

Legend

- (C) Team captain
- (S) Suspended
- (I) Ineligible
- (W) Walk-on
- Injured
- Current redshirt

Roster
Last update: August 23, 2024

== Schedule and results ==
Date time, TV	Rank^{#}	Opponent^{#}	Result	Record	High points	High rebounds	High assists	Site (attendance) city, state
Exhibition
October 31, 2017*; 7:00 p.m.		LSU–Shreveport	W 86–48		16 – Bayonne	9 – Fields	4 – Swain	Cajundome (269); Lafayette, LA
November 4, 2017*; 2:00 p.m.		Xavier (Louisiana)	W 59–50		15 – Doucet	11 – Fields	3 – Swain	Cajundome (279); Lafayette, LA
Non-conference regular season
November 10, 2017*; 7:00 p.m.		New Orleans; Preseason WNIT first round	W 66–57	1–0	18 – Fields	9 – Fields	3 – Goodwin	Cajundome (692); Lafayette, LA
November 12, 2017*; 2:00 p.m.		at No. 20 Texas A&M; Preseason WNIT quarterfinals	L 62–83	1–1	13 – Goodwin	5 – Doucet	4 – Jones	Reed Arena (2,867); College Station, TX
November 18, 2017*; 1:00 p.m., ESPN3		at Toledo; Preseason WNIT consolation round	L 55–79	1–2	12 – Howard	7 – Burton	2 – Howard	Savage Arena (593); Toledo, OH
November 22, 2017*; 7:00 p.m.		Dillard	L 53–60	1–3	14 – Williams	10 – Burton	3 – Mathis	Cajundome (658); Lafayette, LA
November 25, 2017*; 1:00 p.m.		vs. Niagara; South Point Thanksgiving Shootout	W 68–52	2–3	13 – Jones	6 – Burton	3 – Mathis	South Point Arena; Enterprise, NV
November 26, 2017*; 3:15 p.m.		vs. Cleveland State; South Point Thanksgiving Shootout	L 45–54	2–4	15 – Williams	8 – Burton	1 – Howard	South Point Arena; Enterprise, NV
November 29, 2017*; 7:00 p.m.		vs. No. 6 Mississippi State; Jackson Showcase	L 37–94	2–5	14 – Goodwin	7 – Burton	2 – Jones	Mississippi Coliseum (3,578); Jackson, MS
December 3, 2017*; 5:00 p.m., CST		McNeese State	W 98–86 ^{3OT}	3–5	25 – Fields	8 – Howard	4 – Jones	Cajundome (753); Lafayette, LA
December 8, 2017*; 7:00 p.m.		Auburn	L 60–70	3–6	17 – Williams	5 – Burton	3 – Williams	Cajundome (826); Lafayette, LA
December 13, 2017*; 7:00 p.m.		at Southeastern Louisiana	W 68–56	4–6	19 – Fields	10 – Doucet	3 – Goodwin	University Center (549); Hammond, LA
December 17, 2017*; 2:00 p.m.		at LSU	L 45–60	4–7	12 – Fields	7 – Doucet	3 – Swain	Maravich Center (2,011); Baton Rouge, LA
December 20, 2017*; 11:00 a.m.		Alcorn State	W 67–47	5–7	16 – Doucet	11 – Doucet	4 – Burton	Cajundome (2,714); Lafayette, LA
Sun Belt regular season
December 29, 2017; 5:00 p.m.		at Little Rock	L 43–78	5–8 (0–1)	11 – Williams	5 – Fields	3 – Williams	Jack Stephens Center (1,688); Little Rock, AR
December 31, 2017; 1:00 p.m.		at Arkansas State	W 77–75	6–8 (1–1)	25 – Jones	8 – Swain	4 – Swain	First National Bank Arena; Jonesboro, AR
January 4, 2018; 5:00 p.m.		Appalachian State	W 61–45	7–8 (2–1)	22 – Swain	5 – Burton	3 – Thomas	Cajundome (704); Lafayette, LA
January 6, 2018; 4:00 p.m.		Coastal Carolina	W 59–55	8–8 (3–1)	17 – Goodwin	6 – Burton	2 – Thomas	Cajundome (582); Lafayette, LA
January 13, 2018; 4:00 p.m., CST		Louisiana–Monroe	W 63–55	9–8 (4–1)	16 – Fields	8 – Doucet	2 – Thomas	Cajundome (711); Lafayette, LA
January 18, 2018; 5:00 p.m., ESPN3		at Texas–Arlington	L 61–63	9–9 (4–2)	17 – Fields	7 – Fields	2 – Williams	College Park Center (2,384); Arlington, TX
January 20, 2018; 2:00 p.m.		at Texas State	W 65–58	10–9 (5–2)	19 – Swain	9 – Burton	3 – Thomas	Strahan Coliseum (3,222); San Marcos, TX
January 25, 2018; 5:00 p.m.		South Alabama	L 57–72	10–10 (5–3)	16 – Jones	8 – Burton	3 – Jones	Cajundome (590); Lafayette, LA
January 27, 2018; 4:00 p.m.		Troy	L 55–62	10–11 (5–4)	14 – Williams	7 – Burton	4 – Swain	Cajundome (3,087); Lafayette, LA
February 3, 2018; 12:00 p.m., ESPN3		at Louisiana–Monroe	W 76–48	11–11 (6–4)	13 – Thomas	9 – Burton	7 – Thomas	Fant–Ewing Coliseum (2,269); Monroe, LA
February 8, 2018; 4:00 p.m., ESPN3		at Georgia State	W 75–60	10–11 (5–4)	12 – Fields	8 – Doucet	9 – Thomas	GSU Sports Arena (363); Atlanta, GA
February 10, 2018; 1:00 p.m.		at Georgia Southern	W 58–48	11–11 (6–4)	15 – Thomas	10 – Goodwin	5 – Thomas	Hanner Fieldhouse (572); Statesboro, GA
February 15, 2018; 5:00 p.m.		Texas State	L 53–56	13–12 (8–5)	16 – Fields	11 – Fields	2 – Thomas	Cajundome (936); Lafayette, LA
February 17, 2018; 4:00 p.m., ESPN3		Texas–Arlington	L 34–38	13–13 (8–6)	14 – Goodwin	7 – Goodwin	2 – Thomas	Cajundome (733); Lafayette, LA
February 22, 2018; 5:00 p.m., ESPN3		at Troy	L 53–72	13–14 (8–7)	12 – Mathis	8 – Burton	3 – Burton	Trojan Arena (1,429); Troy, AL
February 24, 2018; 5:05 p.m.		at South Alabama	W 59–56	13–15 (8–8)	15 – Doucet	8 – Swain	2 – Mathis	Mitchell Center (1,946); Mobile, AL
March 1, 2018; 5:00 p.m.		Arkansas State	W 60–53	14–15 (9–8)	12 – Goodwin	7 – Doucet	3 – Mathis	Cajundome (925); Lafayette, LA
March 3, 2018; 4:00 p.m.		Little Rock	L 62–73 ^{OT}	15–15 (10–8)	16 – Swain	8 – Fields	3 – Swain	Cajundome (691); Lafayette, LA
Sun Belt women's tournament
March 6, 2018; 7:30 p.m., ESPN3	(6)	vs. (11) Georgia Southern; First round	W 88–81 ^{3OT}	16–15	28 – Goodwin	10 – Doucet	12 – Thomas	Lakefront Arena (628); New Orleans, LA
March 8, 2018; 7:30 p.m., ESPN3	(6)	vs. (3) Texas–Arlington; Quarterfinals	W 54–48	17–15	20 – Swain	7 – Swain	4 – Thomas	Lakefront Arena (854); New Orleans, LA
March 10, 2018; 5:30 p.m., ESPN3	(6)	vs. (2) Texas State; Semifinals	L 56–62	17–16	10 – Goodwin	6 – Fields	5 – Swain	Lakefront Arena (898); New Orleans, LA
*Non-conference game. ^{#}Rankings from AP poll. (#) Tournament seedings in parentheses. All times are in Central.

== See also ==
- 2017–18 Louisiana Ragin' Cajuns men's basketball team
