= 2018 Sun Belt Conference women's basketball tournament =

- Classification: Division I
- Season: 2017–18
- Teams: 12
- Site: Lakefront Arena; New Orleans, Louisiana
- Champions: Little Rock (4th title)
- Winning coach: Joe Foley (4th title)
- MVP: Taeler Deer (Texas State)
- Television: ESPN3

2017–18 Sun Belt Conference women's basketball standings
	Conf.				Overall
Team	W		L	PCT	W		L	PCT
Little Rock †	17	–	1	.944	23	–	10	.697
Texas State	14	–	4	.778	23	–	10	.697
UT Arlington	12	–	6	.667	18	–	12	.600
Troy	12	–	6	.667	18	–	13	.581
South Alabama	11	–	7	.611	21	–	13	.618
Coastal Carolina	10	–	8	.556	17	–	14	.548
Louisiana	10	–	8	.556	17	–	16	.515
Arkansas State	10	–	8	.556	15	–	15	.500
Appalachian State	5	–	13	.278	8	–	23	.258
Georgia State	4	–	14	.222	8	–	22	.267
Georgia Southern	2	–	16	.111	5	–	25	.167
Louisiana–Monroe	1	–	17	.056	4	–	26	.133
† 2018 Sun Belt tournament winner

The 2018 Sun Belt Conference women's basketball tournament was the postseason women's basketball tournament for the Sun Belt Conference, which began on March 6 and ended March 11, 2018, at the Lakefront Arena in New Orleans.

== Seeds ==
2018 Sun Belt women's basketball tournament seeds and results
Seed	School	Conf.	Over.	Tiebreaker
1	Little Rock	17–1	23–9	
2	Texas State	14–4	23–9	
3	Texas–Arlington	12–6	18–12	1–0 vs. Troy
4	Troy	12–6	18–13	0–1 vs. Texas-Arlington
5	South Alabama	11–7	19–12	
6	Louisiana–Lafayette	10–8	17–16	3–0 vs. Coastal Carolina & Arkansas State
7	Coastal Carolina	10–8	17–14	1–1 vs. Texas State
8	Arkansas State	10–8	15–15	0–1 vs. Texas State
9	Appalachian State	5–13	8–23	
10	Georgia State	4–14	8–22	
11	Georgia Southern	2–16	5–25	
12	Louisiana–Monroe	1–17	4–26	
‡ – Sun Belt Conference regular season champions.

== Schedule ==
Session	Game	Time*	Matchup^{#}	Television	Attendance
First round – Tuesday, March 6
1	1	11:30 am	No. 8 Arkansas State vs. No. 9 Appalachian State	ESPN3	628
1	2	2:00 pm	No. 5 South Alabama vs. No. 12 Louisiana-Monroe	ESPN3	628
2	3	5:00 pm	No. 7 Coastal Carolina vs. No. 10 Georgia State	ESPN3	628
2	4	7:30 pm	No. 6 Louisiana-Lafayette vs. No. 11 Georgia Southern	ESPN3	628
Quarterfinals – Thursday, March 8
3	5	11:30 am	No. 1 Little Rock vs. No. 9 Appalachian State	ESPN3	967
3	6	2:00 pm	No. 4 Troy vs. No. 5 South Alabama	ESPN3	967
4	7	5:00 pm	No. 2 Texas State vs. No. 7 Coastal Carolina	ESPN3	854
4	8	7:30 pm	No. 3 Texas-Arlington vs. No. 6 Louisiana-Lafayette	ESPN3	854
Semifinals – Saturday, March 10
5	9	5:00 pm	No. 1 Little Rock vs. No. 4 Troy	ESPN3	898
5	10	7:30 pm	No. 2 Texas State vs. No. 6 Louisiana-Lafayette	ESPN3	898
Championship – Sunday, March 11
6	11	6:00 pm	No. 1 Little Rock vs. No. 2 Texas State	ESPN3	1,214
*Game times in CT. #-Rankings denote tournament seed

== Bracket ==
First round Tuesday, March 6 ESPN3
8	Arkansas State	68
9	Appalachian State	79
5	South Alabama	80
12	Louisiana–Monroe	64
7	Coastal Carolina	74
10	Georgia State	55
6	Louisiana–Lafayette	88
11	Georgia Southern	88

Quarterfinals; Thursday, March 8 ESPN3
1	Little Rock	66
9	Appalachian State	34
4	Troy	82
5	South Alabama	79
2	Texas State	78
7	Coastal Carolina	69
3	Texas–Arlington	48
6	Louisiana–Lafayette	54

Semifinals; Saturday, March 10; ESPN3
1	Little Rock	66
4	Troy	63
2	Texas State	62
6	Louisiana–Lafayette	56

Championship Game; Sunday, March 11; ESPN3
1	Little Rock	54
2	Texas State	53

All times listed are Central

== See also ==
- 2018 Sun Belt Conference men's basketball tournament
