= 2017–18 Coastal Carolina Chanticleers women's basketball team =

Intercollegiate basketball season

2017–18 Coastal Carolina Chanticleers women's basketball
- Conference: Sun Belt Conference
- Record: 17–14 (10–8 Sun Belt)
- Head coach: Jaida Williams (5th season)
- Assistant coaches: Vanessa Taylor; Latisha Luckett; AJ Jordan
- Home arena: HTC Center

2017–18 Sun Belt Conference women's basketball standings
| | Conf. | | | | Overall |
| Team | W | | L | PCT | W | | L | PCT |
|---|---|---|---|---|---|---|---|---|
| Little Rock † | 17 | – | 1 | .944 | 23 | – | 10 | .697 |
| Texas State | 14 | – | 4 | .778 | 23 | – | 10 | .697 |
| UT Arlington | 12 | – | 6 | .667 | 18 | – | 12 | .600 |
| Troy | 12 | – | 6 | .667 | 18 | – | 13 | .581 |
| South Alabama | 11 | – | 7 | .611 | 21 | – | 13 | .618 |
| Coastal Carolina | 10 | – | 8 | .556 | 17 | – | 14 | .548 |
| Louisiana | 10 | – | 8 | .556 | 17 | – | 16 | .515 |
| Arkansas State | 10 | – | 8 | .556 | 15 | – | 15 | .500 |
| Appalachian State | 5 | – | 13 | .278 | 8 | – | 23 | .258 |
| Georgia State | 4 | – | 14 | .222 | 8 | – | 22 | .267 |
| Georgia Southern | 2 | – | 16 | .111 | 5 | – | 25 | .167 |
| Louisiana–Monroe | 1 | – | 17 | .056 | 4 | – | 26 | .133 |
† 2018 Sun Belt tournament winner

The 2017–18 Coastal Carolina Chanticleers women's basketball team represented Coastal Carolina University in the 2017–18 NCAA Division I women's basketball season. The Chanticleers, led by fifth year head coach Jaida Williams, played their home games at HTC Center and were members of the Sun Belt Conference. They finished the season 17–14, 10–8 in Sun Belt play to finish in a 3 way tie for sixth place. They advanced to the quarterfinals of the Sun Belt women's tournament, where they lost to Texas State.

== Previous season ==
They finished the season 13–16, 8–10 in Sun Belt play to finish in a tie for seventh place. They lost in the first round of the Sun Belt women's tournament to Appalachian State.

== Roster ==
2017–18 Coastal Carolina Chanticleers women's basketball team
Players
Coaches

| Pos. | # | Name | Height | Year | Previous school | Hometown |
|---|---|---|---|---|---|---|
| G | 1 | Mery Visone | 5 ft 8 in (1.73 m) | Fr | IMG Academy | Naples, Italy |
| G | 2 | Breelyn Blanding | 5 ft 9 in (1.75 m) | Jr | Ridgeview HS | Columbia, SC |
| G | 4 | Tiarra Davis | 5 ft 6 in (1.68 m) | Fr | Holy Names Catholic | Windsor, ON |
| G | 10 | Jas Adams | 5 ft 7 in (1.7 m) | Sr | Ronald W. Reagan HS | Winston-Salem, NC |
| G | 11 | Kiara Norman | 5 ft 4 in (1.63 m) | Fr | Norfolk Christian | Virginia Beach, VA |
| G | 14 | Kaylin West | 5 ft 7 in (1.7 m) | Fr | IMG Academy | Bethlehem, PA |
| F | 20 | Janae Camp | 6 ft 1 in (1.85 m) | Fr | TPLS Academy | Portsmouth, VA |
| F | 25 | Isiuwa Oghagbon | 5 ft 11 in (1.8 m) | Fr | Mercersburg Academy | Haymarket, VA |
| C | 30 | Naheria Hamilton | 6 ft 4 in (1.93 m) | So | Eastern Wayne HS | Goldsboro, NC |
| G | 32 | DJ Williams | 5 ft 10 in (1.78 m) | So | JW North HS | Moreno Valley, CA |
| F | 40 | Jamie Williams | 6 ft 4 in (1.93 m) | Jr | Coral Springs Charter | Coral Springs, FL |
| F | 54 | Alise Davis | 5 ft 11 in (1.8 m) | Fr | Tampa Catholic | Tampa, FL |

Head coach

- Jaida Williams (Cal Poly Pomona)

Assistant coach(es)

- Vanessa Taylor (Tuskegee)
- AJ Jordan (Coastal Carolina)
- Latisha Luckett (Central Michigan)

Legend

- (C) Team captain
- (S) Suspended
- (I) Ineligible
- (W) Walk-on
- Injured
- Current redshirt

Roster
Last update: January 12, 2018

== Schedule ==
| Date time, TV | Rank^{#} | Opponent^{#} | Result | Record | Site (attendance) city, state |
Non-conference regular season
| 11/10/2017*; 5:00 pm | | Lees–McRae | W 73–47 | 1–0 | HTC Center (241); Conway, SC |
| 11/14/2017*; 6:00 pm | | UNC Greensboro | L 54–60 | 1–1 | HTC Center (233); Conway, SC |
| 11/18/2017*; 2:00 pm | | UNC Wilmington | W 57–41 | 2–1 | HTC Center (276); Conway, SC |
| 11/20/2017*; 6:00 pm | | Allen | W 93–49 | 3–1 | HTC Center (217); Conway, SC |
| 11/23/2017*; 2:00 pm | | vs. North Texas; San Juan Shootout | L 34–50 | 3–2 | Ocean Center (217); Daytona Beach, FL |
| 11/24/2017*; 2:00 pm | | vs. Nebraska; San Juan Shootout | L 47–55 | 3–3 | Ocean Center (175); Daytona Beach, FL |
| 11/30/2017*; 6:00 pm | | College of Charleston | L 70–72 | 3–4 | HTC Center (335); Conway, SC |
| 12/04/2017*; 6:00 pm | | Fort Wayne | W 67–58 ^{OT} | 4–4 | HTC Center (272); Conway, SC |
| 12/06/2017*; 6:00 pm | | North Carolina Central | W 68–65 | 5–4 | HTC Center (242); Conway, SC |
| 12/17/2017*; 6:30 pm | | vs. Syracuse; Carolinas Challenge | L 57–69 | 5–5 | Myrtle Beach Convention Center; Myrtle Beach, SC |
| 12/20/2017*; 6:30 pm | | Wofford | W 67–51 | 6–5 | HTC Center (272); Conway, SC |
Sun Belt regular season
| 12/29/2017; 3:30 pm | | Texas–Arlington | W 89–76 | 7–5 (1–0) | HTC Center (293); Conway, SC |
| 12/31/2017; 1:00 pm | | Texas State | W 65–64 | 8–5 (2–0) | HTC Center (250); Conway, SC |
| 01/04/2018; 6:00 pm | | at Louisiana–Monroe | L 56–62 | 8–6 (2–1) | Fant–Ewing Coliseum (1,318); Monroe, LA |
| 01/06/2018; 5:00 pm | | at Louisiana | L 55–59 | 8–7 (2–2) | Cajundome (582); Lafayette, LA |
| 01/11/2018; 5:00 pm | | Georgia Southern | W 54–51 | 9–7 (3–2) | HTC Center (230); Conway, SC |
| 01/13/2018; 1:00 pm, ESPN3 | | Georgia State | W 64–49 | 10–7 (4–2) | HTC Center (295); Conway, SC |
| 01/18/2018; 6:05 pm | | at South Alabama | L 62–68 | 10–8 (4–3) | Mitchell Center (295); Mobile, AL |
| 01/20/2018; 3:00 pm, ESPN3 | | at Troy | W 97–92 | 11–8 (5–3) | Trojan Arena (1,691); Troy, AL |
| 01/25/2018; 5:00 pm | | Arkansas State | L 63–70 | 11–9 (5–4) | HTC Center (260); Conway, SC |
| 01/27/2018; 1:00 pm | | Little Rock | L 49–51 | 11–10 (5–5) | HTC Center (297); Conway, SC |
| 02/01/2018; 6:00 pm | | at Texas State | L 69–78 | 11–11 (5–6) | Strahan Coliseum (2,278); San Marcos, TX |
| 02/03/2018; 3:00 pm, ESPN3 | | at Texas–Arlington | L 63–65 | 11–12 (5–7) | College Park Center; Arlington, TX |
| 02/10/2018; 1:00 pm | | Appalachian State | W 73–68 ^{OT} | 12–12 (6–7) | HTC Center (386); Conway, SC |
| 02/15/2018; 5:00 pm | | Troy | W 84–71 | 13–12 (7–7) | HTC Center (303); Conway, SC |
| 02/17/2018; 1:00 pm | | South Alabama | W 71–57 | 14–12 (8–7) | HTC Center (357); Conway, SC |
| 02/22/2018; 6:00 pm | | at Little Rock | L 44–53 | 14–13 (8–8) | Jack Stephens Center (1,288); Little Rock, AR |
| 02/24/2018; 4:00 pm | | at Arkansas State | W 73–65 | 15–13 (9–8) | First National Bank Arena (599); Jonesboro, AR |
| 03/03/2018; 1:00 pm, ESPN3 | | at Appalachian State | W 66–51 | 16–13 (10–8) | Holmes Center (484); Boone, NC |
Sun Belt Women's Tournament
| 03/06/2018; 6:00 pm, ESPN3 | (7) | vs. (10) Georgia State; Semifinals | W 74–55 | 17–13 | Lakefront Arena; New Orleans, LA |
| 03/08/2018; 6:00 pm, ESPN3 | (7) | vs. (2) Texas State; Quarterfinals | L 69–78 | 17–14 | Lakefront Arena; New Orleans, LA |
*Non-conference game. ^{#}Rankings from AP Poll. (#) Tournament seedings in parentheses. All times are in Eastern Time.

== See also ==
2017–18 Coastal Carolina Chanticleers men's basketball team
