= 2017–18 Appalachian State Mountaineers women's basketball team =

Intercollegiate basketball season

2017–18 Appalachian State Mountaineers women's basketball
- Conference: Sun Belt Conference
- Record: 8–23 (5–13 Sun Belt)
- Head coach: Angel Elderkin (4th season)
- Assistant coaches: Sam Pierce Jr.; Cristina Centeno; Kate Dempsey
- Home arena: Holmes Center

2017–18 Sun Belt Conference women's basketball standings
	Conf.				Overall
Team	W		L	PCT	W		L	PCT
Little Rock †	17	–	1	.944	23	–	10	.697
Texas State	14	–	4	.778	23	–	10	.697
UT Arlington	12	–	6	.667	18	–	12	.600
Troy	12	–	6	.667	18	–	13	.581
South Alabama	11	–	7	.611	21	–	13	.618
Coastal Carolina	10	–	8	.556	17	–	14	.548
Louisiana	10	–	8	.556	17	–	16	.515
Arkansas State	10	–	8	.556	15	–	15	.500
Appalachian State	5	–	13	.278	8	–	23	.258
Georgia State	4	–	14	.222	8	–	22	.267
Georgia Southern	2	–	16	.111	5	–	25	.167
Louisiana–Monroe	1	–	17	.056	4	–	26	.133
† 2018 Sun Belt tournament winner

The 2017–18 Appalachian State Mountaineers women's basketball team represented Appalachian State University in the 2017–18 NCAA Division I women's basketball season. The Eagles, led by fourth-year head coach Angel Elderkin, played their home games at George M. Holmes Convocation Center and were members of the Sun Belt Conference. They finished the season 8–23, 5–13 in Sun Belt play, to finish in ninth place. They advanced to the quarterfinals of the Sun Belt women's tournament where they lost to Little Rock.

== Previous season ==
They finished the 2016–17 season 13–19, 6–12 in Sun Belt play, to finish in ninth place. They advanced to the quarterfinals of the Sun Belt women's tournament where they lost to Little Rock.

== Roster ==
2017–18 Appalachian State Mountaineers women's basketball team
Players
Coaches

Pos.	#	Name	Height	Year	Previous school	Hometown
F	1	Maya Calder	6 ft 0 in (1.83 m)	Fr	National Christian Academy	Landover, MD
G	3	Tierra Wilson	5 ft 8 in (1.73 m)	Fr	RJ Reynolds	Winston-Salem, NC
G	4	Nicola Mathews	5 ft 8 in (1.73 m)	So	Cabra Dominican; College of Central Florida	Adelaide, Australia
G	5	LaPresha Stanley	5 ft 9 in (1.75 m)	Fr	Rockledge	Rockledge, FL
G	10	Kaila Craven	5 ft 8 in (1.73 m)	RS So	Southwestern Randolph	Asheboro, NC
G/F	14	Armani Hampton	5 ft 11 in (1.8 m)	So	Atkins	Winston-Salem, NC
G/F	20	Katelyn Doub	5 ft 10 in (1.78 m)	Sr	Southwestern Randolph	Asheboro, NC
G	23	Ashley Polacek (redshirt)	5 ft 5 in (1.65 m)	Jr	SPIRE Institute; UCF	Ottawa, ON
G	24	Anna Perez Gomez	5 ft 10 in (1.78 m)	Jr	CB Arenys; Eastern Wyoming College	Canet de Mar, Spain
F	30	Lainey Gosnell	6 ft 1 in (1.85 m)	Fr	Habersham Central	Demorest, GA
F	32	Dominique Jeffery	6 ft 1 in (1.85 m)	Fr	FAMU DRS	Tallahassee, FL
G	34	Madi Story	5 ft 10 in (1.78 m)	Sr	Bandys	Maiden, NC
F/C	42	Bayley Plummer	6 ft 2 in (1.88 m)	So	East Davidson	Thomasville, NC

Head coach

- Angel Elderkin (Southern Maine)

Assistant coach(es)

- Sam Pierce Jr. (Slippery Rock)
- Cristina Centeno (Siena)
- Kate Dempsey (Wofford)

Legend

- (C) Team captain
- (S) Suspended
- (I) Ineligible
- (W) Walk-on
- Injured
- Current redshirt

Roster
Last update: August 19, 2024

== Schedule ==
Date time, TV	Rank^{#}	Opponent^{#}	Result	Record	Site (attendance) city, state
Exhibition
October 31, 2017*; 3:00 p.m.		Tusculum	W 78–58		Holmes Center; Boone, NC
Non-conference regular season
November 10, 2017*; 7:00 p.m.		Georgia Tech	L 41–75	0–1	Holmes Center (750); Boone, NC
November 12, 2017*; 5:00 p.m.		at Radford	L 40–61	0–2	Dedmon Center (689); Radford, VA
November 15, 2017*; 6:00 p.m.		East Tennessee State	L 57–70	0–3	Holmes Center (317); Boone, NC
November 19, 2017*; 2:00 p.m.		Davidson	L 57–59	0–4	Holmes Center (322); Boone, NC
November 21, 2017*; 5:30 p.m.		at North Carolina A&T	L 56–81	0–5	Corbett Sports Center (550); Greensboro, NC
November 26, 2017*; 2:00 p.m.		at College of Charleston	W 76–70	1–5	TD Arena (333); Charleston, SC
December 1, 2017*; 11:00 a.m.		UAB	L 59–70	1–6	Holmes Center (466); Boone, NC
December 3, 2017*; 5:30 p.m., ACCNX		at North Carolina	L 43–56	1–7	Carmichael Arena (2,617); Chapel Hill, NC
December 7, 2017*; 7:00 p.m.		at Wake Forest	L 49–78	1–8	LJVM Coliseum (509); Winston-Salem, NC
December 16, 2017*; 1:00 p.m.		at Marshall	W 56–54	2–8	Cam Henderson Center (615); Huntington, WV
December 21, 2017*; 7:00 p.m.		at UNC Asheville	L 60–69 ^{OT}	2–9	Kimmel Arena (896); Asheville, NC
Sun Belt regular season
December 29, 2017; 5:00 p.m.		Texas State	L 54–69	2–10 (0–1)	Holmes Center (654); Boone, NC
December 31, 2017; 12:00 p.m.		UT Arlington	L 60–64	2–11 (0–2)	Holmes Center (275); Boone, NC
January 4, 2018; 6:00 p.m.		at Louisiana	L 45–61	2–12 (0–3)	Cajundome (704); Lafayette, LA
January 6, 2018; 1:00 p.m.		at Louisiana–Monroe	W 71–67	3–11 (1–3)	Fant–Ewing Coliseum (1,423); Monroe, LA
January 11, 2018; 5:00 p.m.		Georgia State	W 77–62	4–11 (2–3)	Holmes Center (282); Boone, NC
January 13, 2018; 1:00 p.m.		Georgia Southern	W 87–56	5–11 (3–3)	Holmes Center (357); Boone, NC
January 20, 2018; 2:00 p.m.		at South Alabama	L 52–54	5–12 (3–4)	Mitchell Center (3,877); Mobile, AL
January 22, 2018; 6:00 p.m., ESPN3		at Troy	L 74–81	5–13 (3–5)	Trojan Arena (1,069); Troy, AL
January 25, 2018; 5:00 p.m., ESPN3		Little Rock	L 40–52	5–14 (3–6)	Holmes Center (297); Boone, NC
January 27, 2018; 1:00 p.m., ESPN3		Arkansas State	W 68–66	6–14 (4–6)	Holmes Center (319); Boone, NC
February 1, 2018; 6:00 p.m., ESPN3		at UT Arlington	L 48–49	6–16 (4–7)	College Park Center (2,330); Arlington, TX
February 3, 2018; 3:00 p.m.		at Texas State	L 50–92	6–17 (4–8)	Strahan Coliseum (1,744); San Marcos, TX
February 15, 2018; 5:00 p.m.		South Alabama	W 57–56 ^{OT}	7–18 (5–9)	Holmes Center (278); Boone, NC
February 10, 2018; 1:00 p.m.		at Coastal Carolina	L 68–73 ^{OT}	7–19 (5–10)	HTC Center (386); Conway, SC
February 17, 2018; 1:00 p.m., ESPN3		Troy	L 74–81	7–19 (5–10)	Holmes Center (582); Boone, NC
February 22, 2018; 6:00 p.m., ESPN3		at Arkansas State	L 52–69	7–20 (5–11)	First National Bank Arena (319); Jonesboro, AR
February 24, 2018; 4:00 p.m.		at Little Rock	L 35–61	7–21 (5–12)	Jack Stephens Center (1,794); Little Rock, AR
March 3, 2018; 1:00 p.m., ESPN3		Coastal Carolina	L 51–66	7–22 (5–13)	Holmes Center (484); Boone, NC
Sun Belt women's tournament
March 6, 2018; 12:30 p.m., ESPN3	(9)	vs. (8) Arkansas State; First round	W 79–68	8–22	Lakefront Arena; New Orleans, LA
March 8, 2018; 12:30 p.m., ESPN3	(9)	vs. (1) Little Rock; Quarterfinals	L 34–66	8–23	Lakefront Arena; New Orleans, LA
*Non-conference game. ^{#}Rankings from AP poll. (#) Tournament seedings in parentheses. All times are in Eastern.

== See also ==
- 2017–18 Appalachian State Mountaineers men's basketball team
