= Georgia Southern–Georgia State rivalry =

College sports rivalry

| Georgia Southern Eagles | Georgia State Panthers |

Football Rivalry
- First meeting: October 25, 2014; Georgia Southern 69, Georgia State 31
- Latest meeting: November 14, 2026; Georgia Southern 34, Georgia State 17
- Next meeting: 2027; Statesboro
- Total meetings: 13
- All-time series: Georgis Southern, 7–6
- Largest victory: Georgia Southern, 69–31 (2014)
- Longest win streak: Georgia Southern, 4 (2023–present)
- Current win streak: Georgia Southern, 4 (2023–present)

Men's Basketball Rivalry
- First meeting: February 19, 1972; Georgia Southern 103, Georgia State 55
- Latest meeting: February 19, 2026; Georgia State 66, Georgia Southern 64
- Total meetings: 73
- All-time series: Georgia Southern leads 42–31
- Largest victory: Georgia Southern, 103–55 (1972); Georgia Southern, 109–61 (1985)
- Longest win streak: Georgia Southern, 7 (3×)
- Current win streak: Georgia State, 1 (2026–present)

Locations of Georgia Southern and Georgia State

The Georgia Southern–Georgia State rivalry, also known as the Georgia Grown Bowl and Modern Day Hate, is a college athletics rivalry between the Georgia Southern Eagles and Georgia State Panthers. Both schools are members of the Sun Belt Conference (SBC).

For the 2021–22 school year, the men's soccer rivalry temporarily moved to the Mid-American Conference, with both schools joining that league for men's soccer after the SBC disbanded its men's soccer league. However, SBC expansion in 2022 and the addition of three "Power Five" programs led to the reinstatement of SBC men's soccer effective in 2022–23. While the teams have only met nine times in football (due to Georgia State beginning their program in 2010), the rivalry dates back to the 1970s in basketball and other sports.

== History ==
Georgia Southern and Georgia State have only competed against each other in football since 2014. They played annually in basketball from the 1971–72 to 1980–81 seasons, 1995–96 and 1996–97, and 2009–10 to 2013–14 out-of-conference and as conference mates from the 1985–86 to 1991–92 seasons in the Trans America Athletic Conference (which is now the Atlantic Sun Conference) and since the 2014–15 season in the Sun Belt Conference. Starting in December 2009, the two teams went nearly 10 years without losing a home game to their rival. The streak was snapped on March 9, 2019 when Georgia State won in Statesboro by a score of 90–85. Georgia Southern has a 42–31 lead in the all-time basketball series.

Because both schools can be abbreviated GSU, a point of conflict between the two is the claim by either fan base that their university is, in fact, "the real GSU." Georgia State lays claim to the initials as it became a university (and therefore GSU) in 1969 while Georgia Southern did not achieve university status until 1990. Both schools are referred to as GSU colloquially in their region of the state, though Georgia State is the only one of the two that officially brands itself "GSU." In 2014, when Georgia Southern joined the Sun Belt Conference (the conference Georgia State joined the year prior), Georgia Southern updated its branding and media guidelines to explicitly state the school should be referred to as "Georgia Southern" or "GS" to avoid confusion in the media. But fixtures on their campus such as the "GSU" hedge and traditions like the marching band's "GSU Scramble" remain.

The rivalry intensified after the hire of former Appalachian State (longtime rival of Georgia Southern) athletic director Charlie Cobb to the same position at Georgia State University. During Georgia State's press release introducing Cobb, he revealed that Georgia Southern's athletic director Tom Kleinlein told him "welcome, now the war is on." The two teams first met on the gridiron during the 2014 football season. During the run up to the game, fans from both teams expressed their dislike for the other over social media outlets such as Twitter. Students at the time used the hashtags "SouthernNotState" and "StateNotSouthern" in their tweets to differentiate which GSU they attended. Both schools adopted the phrases as a slogan that defined their side of the rivalry. During the period before the game, a beat writer for The Atlanta Journal-Constitution dubbed the matchup as "Modern Day Hate," a play on the rivalry between Georgia and Georgia Tech: Clean, Old-Fashioned Hate. Georgia Southern beat Georgia State by a final score of 69–31 in the Georgia Dome in front of 28,427 fans. After the game, Georgia Southern fans unrolled a banner saying "Paulson Stadium North" claiming the stadium as their own and cementing the rivalry. The following season, Georgia State handed Georgia Southern their worst home defeat in school history with a final score of 34–7. The football series is led by Georgia Southern, 7–6.

In 2024, the schools announced the intent to stop calling the football game "Modern Day Hate" alongside a partnership with the Georgia Department of Agriculture to rename the rivalry the Georgia Grown Bowl, named after the department's "Georgia Grown" marketing campaign. The two schools will begin competing for the Commissioner's Cup trophy.

== Football game results ==
| Georgia Southern victories | Georgia State victories |

| No. | Date | Location | Winner | Score |
|---|---|---|---|---|
| 1 | October 25, 2014 | Atlanta, GA | Georgia Southern | 69–31 |
| 2 | December 5, 2015 | Statesboro, GA | Georgia State | 34–7 |
| 3 | November 19, 2016 | Atlanta, GA | Georgia State | 30–24 |
| 4 | November 4, 2017 | Statesboro, GA | Georgia State | 21–17 |
| 5 | November 24, 2018 | Atlanta, GA | Georgia Southern | 35–14 |
| 6 | November 30, 2019 | Statesboro, GA | Georgia Southern | 38–10 |
| 7 | November 28, 2020 | Atlanta, GA | Georgia State | 30–24 |
| 8 | October 30, 2021 | Statesboro, GA | Georgia State | 21–14 |
| 9 | October 8, 2022 | Atlanta, GA | Georgia State | 41–33 |
| 10 | October 26, 2023 | Statesboro, GA | Georgia Southern | 44–27 |
| 11 | September 28, 2024 | Atlanta, GA | Georgia Southern | 38–21 |
| 12 | October 18, 2025 | Statesboro, GA | Georgia Southern | 41–24 |
| 13 | November 14, 2026 | Atlanta, GA | Georgia Southern | 34–17 |
Series: Georgia Southern leads 7–6

== Men's basketball game results ==
Table shows results since both teams officially entered NCAA basketball competition with one another.

| Georgia Southern victories | Georgia State victories |

| No. | Date | Location | Winner | Score |
|---|---|---|---|---|
| 1 | February 19, 1972 | Atlanta, GA | Georgia Southern | 103–55 |
| 2 | March 1, 1972 | Statesboro, GA | Georgia Southern | 107–77 |
| 3 | February 19, 1973 | Atlanta, GA | Georgia Southern | 79–62 |
| 4 | February 24, 1973 | Statesboro, GA | Georgia State | 97–96 |
| 5 | February 20, 1974 | Statesboro, GA | Georgia Southern | 126–91 |
| 6 | March 1, 1974 | Atlanta, GA | Georgia Southern | 89–71 |
| 7 | December 7, 1974 | Atlanta, GA | Georgia State | 69–59 |
| 8 | January 16, 1975 | Statesboro, GA | Georgia Southern | 82–73 |
| 9 | December 8, 1975 | Statesboro, GA | Georgia State | 83–72 |
| 10 | February 14, 1976 | Atlanta, GA | Georgia State | 107–88 |
| 11 | January 15, 1977 | Statesboro, GA | Georgia Southern | 83–65 |
| 12 | February 21, 1977 | Statesboro, GA | Georgia Southern | 81–75 |
| 13 | November 30, 1977 | Atlanta, GA | Georgia Southern | 75–73 |
| 14 | January 9, 1978 | Statesboro, GA | Georgia Southern | 88–83 |
| 15 | November 27, 1978 | Atlanta, GA | Georgia Southern | 86–68 |
| 16 | January 20, 1979 | Statesboro, GA | Georgia Southern | 81–79 |
| 17 | December 8, 1979 | Statesboro, GA | Georgia Southern | 70–66 |
| 18 | February 13, 1980 | Atlanta, GA | Georgia State | 96–68 |
| 19 | December 6, 1980 | Atlanta, GA | Georgia State | 81–69 |
| 20 | January 14, 1981 | Statesboro, GA | Georgia Southern | 80–61 |
| 21 | January 10, 1985 | Atlanta, GA | Georgia Southern | 77–61 |
| 22 | February 7, 1985 | Statesboro, GA | Georgia Southern | 77–50 |
| 23 | March 2, 1985 | Statesboro, GA | Georgia Southern | 109–61 |
| 24 | January 9, 1986 | Statesboro, GA | Georgia Southern | 91–77 |
| 25 | February 6, 1986 | Atlanta, GA | Georgia Southern | 66–62 |
| 26 | January 3, 1987 | Atlanta, GA | Georgia Southern | 85–79 |
| 27 | February 5, 1987 | Statesboro, GA | Georgia State | 73–68 |
| 28 | January 7, 1988 | Statesboro, GA | Georgia Southern | 80–60 |
| 29 | February 11, 1988 | Atlanta, GA | Georgia Southern | 73–65 |
| 30 | March 10, 1988 | Daytona Beach, FL | Georgia Southern | 71–55 |
| 31 | January 5, 1989 | Statesboro, GA | Georgia Southern | 100–93 |
| 32 | February 2, 1989 | Atlanta, GA | Georgia Southern | 95–90 |
| 33 | January 27, 1990 | Statesboro, GA | Georgia Southern | 68–66 |
| 34 | February 22, 1990 | Statesboro, GA | Georgia Southern | 78–66 |
| 35 | January 17, 1991 | Atlanta, GA | Georgia State | 73–72 |
| 36 | February 14, 1991 | Statesboro, GA | Georgia State | 90–86^{OT} |
| 37 | January 11, 1992 | Atlanta, GA | Georgia Southern | 88–87 |

| No. | Date | Location | Winner | Score |
|---|---|---|---|---|
| 38 | February 8, 1992 | Statesboro, GA | Georgia Southern | 91–84 |
| 39 | March 11, 1992 | Statesboro, GA | Georgia Southern | 95–82 |
| 40 | December 12, 1995 | Atlanta, GA | Georgia State | 60–58 |
| 41 | December 21, 1996 | Statesboro, GA | Georgia State | 68–49 |
| 42 | December 22, 2009 | Atlanta, GA | Georgia State | 85–65 |
| 43 | December 22, 2010 | Statesboro, GA | Georgia Southern | 74–72^{OT} |
| 44 | December 22, 2011 | Atlanta, GA | Georgia State | 72–52 |
| 45 | December 29, 2012 | Statesboro, GA | Georgia Southern | 68–64^{OT} |
| 46 | December 20, 2013 | Atlanta, GA | Georgia State | 73–61 |
| 47 | February 5, 2015 | Statesboro, GA | Georgia Southern | 58–54 |
| 48 | March 7, 2015 | Atlanta, GA | Georgia State | 72–55 |
| 49 | March 15, 2015 | New Orleans, LA | Georgia State | 38–36 |
| 50 | January 19, 2016 | Atlanta, GA | Georgia State | 69–66^{OT} |
| 51 | February 23, 2016 | Statesboro, GA | Georgia Southern | 54–52 |
| 52 | December 31, 2016 | Statesboro, GA | Georgia Southern | 88–65 |
| 53 | March 4, 2017 | Atlanta, GA | Georgia State | 72–67 |
| 54 | January 20, 2018 | Atlanta, GA | Georgia State | 83–66 |
| 55 | February 16, 2018 | Statesboro, GA | Georgia Southern | 85–80 |
| 56 | March 10, 2018 | New Orleans, LA | Georgia State | 73–67 |
| 57 | February 2, 2019 | Atlanta, GA | Georgia State | 81–72 |
| 58 | March 9, 2019 | Statesboro, GA | Georgia State | 90–85 |
| 59 | January 25, 2020 | Statesboro, GA | Georgia State | 82–77 |
| 60 | February 28, 2020 | Atlanta, GA | Georgia Southern | 79–70 |
| 61 | March 11, 2020 | Atlanta, GA | Georgia Southern | 81–62 |
| 62 | February 11, 2021 | Atlanta, GA | Georgia State | 79–75 |
| 63 | February 17, 2022 | Atlanta, GA | Georgia State | 79–63 |
| 64 | February 19, 2022 | Statesboro, GA | Georgia State | 58–49 |
| 65 | January 21, 2023 | Statesboro, GA | Georgia Southern | 58–52 |
| 66 | February 2, 2023 | Atlanta, GA | Georgia State | 64–60 |
| 67 | January 13, 2024 | Atlanta, GA | Georgia State | 90–62 |
| 68 | January 20, 2024 | Statesboro, GA | Georgia Southern | 86–70 |
| 69 | January 8, 2025 | Atlanta, GA | Georgia State | 82–78^{OT} |
| 70 | February 28, 2025 | Statesboro, GA | Georgia Southern | 76–75 |
| 71 | March 6, 2025 | Pensacola, FL | Georgia State | 80–71 |
| 72 | December 18, 2025 | Statesboro, GA | Georgia Southern | 90–67 |
| 73 | February 19, 2026 | Atlanta, GA | Georgia State | 66–64 |
Series: Georgia Southern leads 42–31

== Men's soccer results ==
Georgia State leads Georgia Southern 32–12–8 in men's soccer competitions.

| Georgia Southern victories | Georgia State victories | Tie games |

| No. | Date | Location | Winner | Score |
|---|---|---|---|---|
| 1 | October 18, 1980 | Atlanta, GA | Georgia State | 3–0 |
| 2 | October 16, 1981 | Statesboro, GA | Georgia State | 4–0 |
| 3 | October 3, 1982 | Atlanta, GA | Georgia State | 5–0 |
| 4 | October 30, 1983 | Statesboro, GA | Georgia State | 2–1 |
| 5 | October 21, 1984 | Atlanta, GA | Georgia State | 3–0 |
| 6 | September 28, 1985 | Statesboro, GA | Georgia State | 3–1 |
| 7 | October 31, 1985 | Atlanta, GA | Georgia State | 5–0 |
| 8 | October 19, 1986 | Atlanta, GA | Georgia State | 3–0 |
| 9 | November 1, 1986 | Abilene, TX | Georgia State | 4–0 |
| 10 | October 10, 1987 | Statesboro, GA | Georgia Southern | 1–0 |
| 11 | October 31, 1987 | Deland, FL | Georgia State | 1–0 |
| 12 | October 1, 1988 | Atlanta, GA | Georgia State | 2–0 |
| 13 | October 28, 1988 | Atlanta, GA | Georgia State | 4–1 |
| 14 | September 23, 1989 | Atlanta, GA | Georgia State | 6–0 |
| 15 | October 7, 1989 | Statesboro, GA | Georgia State | 5–1 |
| 16 | September 22, 1990 | Atlanta, GA | Georgia Southern | 3–2 |
| 17 | October 13, 1990 | Statesboro, GA | Georgia Southern | 3–0 |
| 18 | September 28, 1991 | Atlanta, GA | Tie | 3–3 |
| 19 | October 23, 1991 | Statesboro, GA | Tie | 1–1 |
| 20 | September 8, 1992 | Decatur, GA | Georgia Southern | 4–2 |
| 21 | September 4, 1993 | Statesboro, GA | Georgia Southern | 1–0 |
| 22 | September 17, 1994 | Decatur, GA | Georgia Southern | 2–1 |
| 23 | October 4, 1995 | Statesboro, GA | Tie | 3–3 |
| 24 | September 21, 1996 | Atlanta, GA | Georgia Southern | 4–2 |
| 25 | September 19, 1997 | Statesboro, GA | Georgia Southern | 3–0 |
| 26 | September 6, 1998 | Decatur, GA | Georgia State | 2–1 |
| 27 | October 13, 1999 | Statesboro, GA | Tie | 3–3 |

| No. | Date | Location | Winner | Score |
|---|---|---|---|---|
| 28 | October 25, 2000 | Decatur, GA | Georgia State | 3–2 |
| 29 | October 30, 2001 | Statesboro, GA | Georgia State | 2–1 |
| 30 | October 8, 2003 | Decatur, GA | Georgia State | 4–3 |
| 31 | October 17, 2004 | Statesboro, GA | Tie | 1–1 |
| 32 | September 14, 2012 | Decatur, GA | Georgia State | 3–0 |
| 33 | October 11, 2013 | Statesboro, GA | Georgia State | 2–1 |
| 34 | November 8, 2014 | Decatur, GA | Georgia State | 1–0 |
| 35 | November 14, 2014 | Statesboro, GA | Georgia Southern | 2–1 |
| 36 | November 7, 2015 | Statesboro, GA | Georgia State | 5–3 |
| 37 | November 13, 2015 | Boone, NC | Tie | 3–3 |
| 38 | October 8, 2016 | Decatur, GA | Georgia Southern | 3–1 |
| 39 | November 11, 2016 | Decatur, GA | Georgia State | 2–0 |
| 40 | October 7, 2017 | Statesboro, GA | Georgia State | 3–1 |
| 41 | November 11, 2017 | Conway, SC | Georgia State | 3–1 |
| 42 | October 20, 2018 | Statesboro, GA | Tie | 1–1 |
| 43 | November 11, 2018 | Statesboro, GA | Georgia State | 4–2 |
| 44 | October 12, 2019 | Decatur, GA | Georgia Southern | 3–1 |
| 45 | November 13, 2019 | Boone, NC | Georgia State | 4–0 |
| 46 | October 4, 2020 | Decatur, GA | Georgia State | 2–0 |
| 47 | October 16, 2020 | Statesboro, GA | Georgia State | 3–0 |
| 48 | November 4, 2021 | Atlanta, GA | Georgia State | 2–1 |
| 49 | October 1, 2022 | Statesboro, GA | Georgia State | 4–2 |
| 50 | October 13, 2023 | Atlanta, GA | Georgia State | 1–0 |
| 51 | October 18, 2024 | Statesboro, GA | Tie | 1–1 |
| 52 | November 4, 2025 | Atlanta, GA | Georgia Southern | 3–1 |
Series: Georgia State leads 32–12–8
