= Hanner Fieldhouse =

Indoor arena in Statesboro, Georgia, U.S.

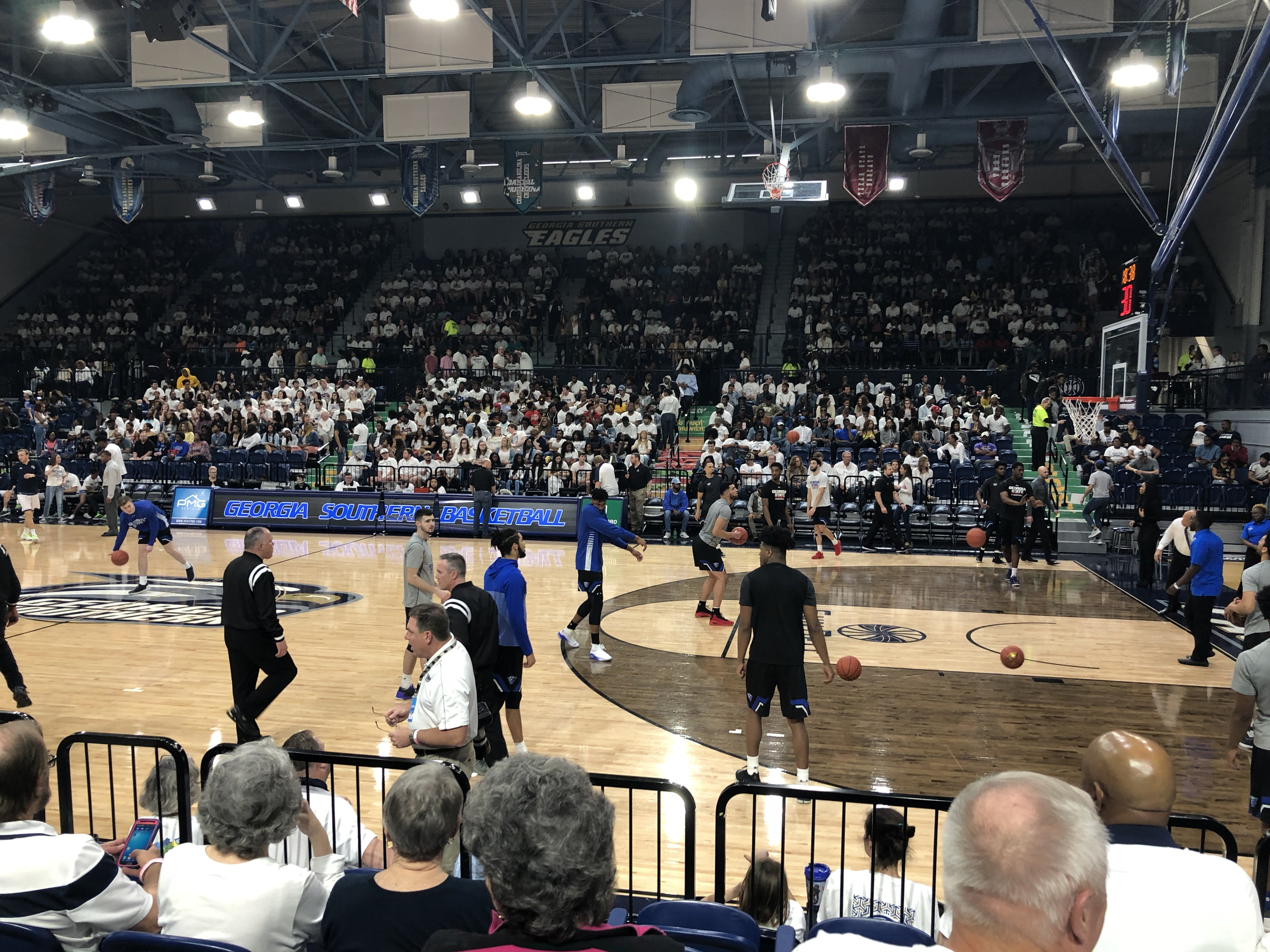
- Interactive map of Hanner Fieldhouse
- Address: 590 Herty Drive, Statesboro, GA 30458
- Location: Statesboro, Georgia
- Coordinates: 32°25′40″N 81°46′46″W
- Owner: Georgia Southern University
- Capacity: 4,325

Construction
- Opened: 1969
- Renovated: 1995, 2016, 2022

Tenants
- Georgia Southern Eagles (NCAA); Men's basketball (1969–2024); Women's basketball (1973–2024); Women's volleyball (1985–present)

Website
- Hanner Fieldhouse

Hanner Fieldhouse is a 4,325-seat multi-purpose arena in Statesboro in the U.S. state of Georgia. It was built in 1969 and was home to the Georgia Southern University men's and women's basketball teams. It currently serves as home to the Georgia Southern Eagles women's volleyball team. It hosted the 1985 and 1992 Atlantic Sun Conference men's basketball tournaments.

In addition to athletic events, Hanner Fieldhouse was also home to the university's fall commencement ceremonies and featured an election rally by then-president George W. Bush in 2006. In 2007, the university held three separate ceremonies at the facility to accommodate the university's growing number of graduates. The older Hanner Gymnasium, which is part of the newer complex, hosted a Rolling Stones concert on May 4, 1965.

On July 21, 2014, the university announced that Hanner Fieldhouse was closed until further notice for construction. In October 2014, the Fieldhouse reopened after minor renovations and held the university's 23rd-annual fall commencement.

== New arena ==
In February 2021, Georgia Southern unveiled plans for a new convocation center in the university's "South Campus" expansion to replace Hanner Fieldhouse. The arena was named the Jack and Ruth Ann Hill Convocation Center, after the late Jack and Ruth Ann Hill, both of whom were Georgia Southern alumni. Natives of nearby Reidsville, Jack Hill was a long-serving Georgia state senator whose district included Statesboro and Bulloch County, and Ruth Ann Hill was a career educator, retiring as principal of Reidsville Elementary School. The convocation center cost $64.4 million and seats 5,500 people for basketball games and up to 5,900 for convocation, commencement, and other events. Groundbreaking for the new convocation center took place on May 26, 2022, and the center opened in December 2024. As of the 2024–25 season, Hill Convocation Center will begin hosting men's and women's basketball games while Hanner Fieldhouse will continue to host women's volleyball matches.
