= 2017–18 Fordham Rams women's basketball team =

Intercollegiate basketball season

2017–18 Fordham Rams women's basketball

Fordham Holiday Classic Champions

WNIT, Third Round
- Conference: Atlantic 10 Conference
- Record: 24–10 (12–4 A-10)
- Head coach: Stephanie Gaitley (7th season)
- Assistant coaches: Angelika Szumilo; Sonia Burke; Valerie Nainima
- Home arena: Rose Hill Gymnasium

2017–18 Atlantic 10 women's basketball standings
	Conf.				Overall
Team	W		L	PCT	W		L	PCT
Dayton	15	–	1	.938	23	–	7	.767
Duquesne	13	–	3	.813	25	–	8	.758
Fordham	12	–	4	.750	24	–	10	.706
George Mason	11	–	5	.688	24	–	10	.706
George Washington †	10	–	6	.625	19	–	14	.576
Saint Joseph's	10	–	6	.625	19	–	15	.559
Saint Louis	9	–	7	.563	17	–	16	.515
Richmond	8	–	8	.500	14	–	17	.452
Davidson	7	–	9	.438	12	–	18	.400
UMass	6	–	10	.375	14	–	16	.467
La Salle	3	–	13	.188	8	–	22	.267
St. Bonaventure	3	–	13	.188	8	–	22	.267
VCU	4	–	12	.250	7	–	22	.241
Rhode Island	1	–	15	.063	3	–	27	.100
† 2018 A10 Tournament winner As of 22 March 2018; Rankings from AP poll

The 2017–18 Fordham Rams women's basketball team represented Fordham University during the 2017–18 NCAA Division I women's basketball season. The Rams were led by seventh-year head coach Stephanie Gaitley. They were members of the Atlantic 10 Conference and played their home games at the Rose Hill Gymnasium. They finished the season 24–10, 12–4 in A-10 play to finish in third place. They advanced to the quarterfinals of the A-10 women's tournament, where they lost to Saint Joseph's. They received an at-large bid to the Women's National Invitation Tournament, where they defeated Harvard and Drexel in the first and second rounds before losing to Virginia Tech in the third round.

== Media ==
=== Fordham Rams Sports Network ===
Fordham Rams games will be broadcast on WFUV Sports and streamed online through the Fordham Portal. Most home games will also be featured on the A-10 Digital Network. Select games will be televised.

== Roster ==
2017–18 Fordham Rams women's basketball team
Players
Coaches

Pos.	#	Name	Height	Year	Previous school	Hometown
G	0	Zara Jillings	5 ft 11 in (1.8 m)	Fr	Westlake Girls	Auckland, New Zealand
G	2	Lauren Holden	5 ft 5 in (1.65 m)	Jr	Lower Cape May Regional	Cape May, NJ
G	3	Katie McLoughlin	5 ft 10 in (1.78 m)	Fr	The Ursuline School	Yonkers, NY
F	5	G'mrice Davis	6 ft 2 in (1.88 m)	Sr	Girard College	Philadelphia, PA
G	10	Breanna Cavanaugh	5 ft 8 in (1.73 m)	RS Fr	Blair Academy; California	Allamuchy, NJ
F	11	Johanna Klug	6 ft 3 in (1.91 m)	Fr	Theodor-Heuss-Gymnasium	Nördlingen, Germany
G	12	Asnate Fomina	5 ft 8 in (1.73 m)	Sr	Riga Secondary School No. 49	Riga, Latvia
C	14	Vilisi Tavui	6 ft 4 in (1.93 m)	Fr	Lelean Memorial	Nausori, Fiji
G	15	Ralene Kwiatkowski	5 ft 8 in (1.73 m)	Fr	Carolina Day School	Asheville, NC
G	20	Kendell Heremaia	5 ft 9 in (1.75 m)	Fr	St. Peter's	Whangārei, New Zealand
G	21	Lauren Murphy	5 ft 9 in (1.75 m)	Fr	Northwest Catholic	West Hartford, CT
F/C	23	Halei Gillis	6 ft 4 in (1.93 m)	Fr	Carolina Day School	Asheville, NC
F	34	Mary Goulding	6 ft 0 in (1.83 m)	Jr	Rangiora; Gillette College	Rangiora, New Zealand
F	42	Kristen Ryan	6 ft 1 in (1.85 m)	Jr	Archbishop John Carroll	Malvern, PA

Head coach

- Stephanie Gaitley (Villanova)

Assistant coach(es)

- Angelika Szumilo (LIU Brooklyn)
- Sonia Burke (Spring Hill)
- Valerie Nainima (South Carolina)

Legend

- (C) Team captain
- (S) Suspended
- (I) Ineligible
- (W) Walk-on
- Injured
- Current redshirt

Roster

== Schedule ==
Date time, TV	Rank^{#}	Opponent^{#}	Result	Record	Site (attendance) city, state
Exhibition
11/03/2017*; 4:30 pm		Hofstra; Puerto Rico Relief Exhibition	L 46–55		Rose Hill Gymnasium; Bronx, NY
11/05/2017*; 2:00 pm		Post	W 83–33		Rose Hill Gymnasium; Bronx, NY
Non-conference regular season
11/10/2017*; 5:00 pm		UMBC	W 55–46	1–0	Rose Hill Gymnasium (1,923); Bronx, NY
11/16/2017*; 11:00 am, ACCN Extra		at Boston College	L 52–55	1–1	Conte Forum (2,563); Chestnut Hill, MA
11/19/2017*; 2:00 pm, ESPN3		at Albany	L 52–59 ^{OT}	1–2	SEFCU Arena (1,209); Albany, NY
11/24/2017*; 7:00 pm		Northern Colorado	W 48–33	2–2	Rose Hill Gymnasium (259); Bronx, NY
11/29/2017*; 7:00 pm		at Manhattan; Battle of the Bronx	W 54–48	3–2	Draddy Gymnasium (149); Riverdale, NY
12/03/2017*; 2:00 pm		Pittsburgh	W 58–55	4–2	Rose Hill Gymnasium (804); Bronx, NY
12/06/2017*; 6:00 pm, BTN		at Penn State	L 60–65	4–3	Bryce Jordan Center (2,390); University Park, PA
12/09/2017*; 1:00 pm		Iona	W 78–48	5–3	Rose Hill Gymnasium (1,578); Bronx, NY
12/12/2017*; 7:00 pm, ESPN3		at St. John's; Rivalry	W 67–64 ^{2OT}	6–3	Carnesecca Arena (587); Queens, NY
12/17/2017*; 2:00 pm		Bucknell	W 71–62	7–3	Rose Hill Gymnasium (883); Bronx, NY
12/20/2017*; 7:00 pm		No. 11 UCLA	L 30–67	7–4	Rose Hill Gymnasium (1,327); Bronx, NY
12/28/2017*; 1:00 pm		Hartford; Fordham Holiday Classic semifinals	W 69–44	8–4	Rose Hill Gymnasium (832); Bronx, NY
12/29/2017*; 3:30 pm		UC Davis; Fordham Holiday Classic championship	W 70–62	9–4	Rose Hill Gymnasium (862); Bronx, NY
Atlantic 10 regular season
12/31/2017; 2:00 pm		George Washington	W 61–50	10–4 (1–0)	Rose Hill Gymnasium (905); Bronx, NY
01/03/2018; 5:00 pm		at UMass	W 62–51	11–4 (2–0)	Mullins Center (364); Amherst, MA
01/06/2018; 1:00 pm, CBSSN		Saint Louis	W 66–63	12–4 (3–0)	Rose Hill Gymnasium (1,805); Bronx, NY
01/10/2018; 12:00 pm		Davidson	W 66–58	13–4 (4–0)	Rose Hill Gymnasium (2,435); Bronx, NY
01/14/2018; 1:00 pm		at VCU	W 64–54	14–4 (5–0)	Siegel Center (619); Richmond, VA
01/17/2018; 7:00 pm		Dayton	L 62–63	14–5 (5–1)	Rose Hill Gymnasium (874); Bronx, NY
01/21/2018; 2:00 pm		at Richmond	W 43–38	15–5 (6–1)	Robins Center (854); Richmond, VA
01/25/2018; 7:00 pm		St. Bonaventure	W 72–48	16–5 (7–1)	Rose Hill Gymnasium (801); Bronx, NY
01/28/2018; 2:00 pm		at George Mason	W 67–62	17–5 (8–1)	EagleBank Arena (2,380); Fairfax, VA
01/31/2018; 12:00 pm, NBCSN		at Saint Louis	L 85–91 ^{2OT}	17–6 (8–2)	Chaifetz Arena (4,320); St. Louis, MO
02/04/2018; 2:00 pm		Rhode Island	W 76–64	18–6 (9–2)	Rose Hill Gymnasium (935); Bronx, NY
02/10/2018; 2:00 pm		at Davidson	W 58–45	19–6 (10–2)	John M. Belk Arena (485); Davidson, NC
02/13/2018; 7:00 pm		La Salle	W 66–45	20–6 (11–2)	Rose Hill Gymnasium (967); Bronx, NY
02/18/2018; 2:00 pm		at Dayton	L 54–79	20–7 (11–3)	UD Arena (3,357); Dayton, OH
02/21/2018; 7:00 pm		at Duquesne	W 51–43	21–7 (12–3)	Palumbo Center (707); Pittsburgh, PA
02/24/2018; 2:00 pm		Saint Joseph's	L 50–52	21–8 (12–4)	Rose Hill Gymnasium (2,366); Bronx, NY
Atlantic 10 Women's Tournament
02/27/2018; 7:00 pm	(3)	(14) Rhode Island; First Round	W 75–53	22–8	Rose Hill Gymnasium (662); Bronx, NY
03/02/2018; 7:00 pm	(3)	vs. (6) Saint Joseph's; Quarterfinals	L 49–52	22–9	Richmond Coliseum; Richmond, VA
WNIT
03/16/2018*; 7:00 pm		Harvard; First Round	W 65–47	23–9	Rose Hill Gymnasium (558); Bronx, NY
03/18/2018*; 4:00 pm		at Drexel; Second Round	W 63–60	24–9	Daskalakis Athletic Center (505); Philadelphia, PA
03/22/2018*; 7:00 pm		at Virginia Tech; Third Round	L 50–81	24–10	Cassell Coliseum (950); Blacksburg, VA
*Non-conference game. ^{#}Rankings from AP Poll. (#) Tournament seedings in parentheses. All times are in Eastern Time.

== Rankings ==
2017–18 NCAA Division I women's basketball rankings

Regular season polls
Poll	Pre- Season	Week 2	Week 3	Week 4	Week 5	Week 6	Week 7	Week 8	Week 9	Week 10	Week 11	Week 12	Week 13	Week 14	Week 15	Week 16	Week 17	Week 18	Week 19	Final
AP																				N/A
Coaches																				

Legend
	Increase in ranking
	Decrease in ranking
	No change
(RV)	Received votes
(NR)	Not ranked

== See also ==
- 2017–18 Fordham Rams men's basketball team
