= 2018 Atlantic 10 women's basketball tournament =

- Classification: Division I
- Season: 2017–18
- Teams: 14
- Site: Campus Sites
- Finals site: Richmond Coliseum; Richmond, VA
- Champions: George Washington (7th title)
- Winning coach: Jennifer Rizzotti (1st title)
- MVP: Brianna Cummings (George Washington)
- Attendance: 10,552
- Television: A10 Digital, ASN, CBSSN, ESPNU

2017–18 Atlantic 10 women's basketball standings
	Conf.				Overall
Team	W		L	PCT	W		L	PCT
Dayton	15	–	1	.938	23	–	7	.767
Duquesne	13	–	3	.813	25	–	8	.758
Fordham	12	–	4	.750	24	–	10	.706
George Mason	11	–	5	.688	24	–	10	.706
George Washington †	10	–	6	.625	19	–	14	.576
Saint Joseph's	10	–	6	.625	19	–	15	.559
Saint Louis	9	–	7	.563	17	–	16	.515
Richmond	8	–	8	.500	14	–	17	.452
Davidson	7	–	9	.438	12	–	18	.400
UMass	6	–	10	.375	14	–	16	.467
La Salle	3	–	13	.188	8	–	22	.267
St. Bonaventure	3	–	13	.188	8	–	22	.267
VCU	4	–	12	.250	7	–	22	.241
Rhode Island	1	–	15	.063	3	–	27	.100
† 2018 A10 Tournament winner As of 22 March 2018; Rankings from AP poll

The 2018 Atlantic 10 women's basketball tournament was a postseason tournament that completed the 2017–18 season of the Atlantic 10 Conference. It was played at campus sites on February 27 for the first round, with the remaining games held on March 2–4 at the Richmond Coliseum in Richmond, Virginia.

== Seeds ==
Teams were seeded by record within the conference, with a tiebreaker system to seed teams with identical conference records.

Seed	School	Conf	Overall	Tiebreaker
#1	Dayton	15–1	22–5	
#2	Duquesne	13–3	23–6	
#3	Fordham	12–4	21–8	
#4	George Mason	11–5	22–8	
#5	George Washington	10–6	15–13	1–0 vs. SJU
#6	Saint Joseph's	10–6	15–13	0–1 vs. GW
#7	Saint Louis	9–7	15–14	
#8	Richmond	8–8	13–16	
#9	Davidson	7–9	12–17	
#10	UMass	6–10	14–15	
#11	VCU	4–12	7–21	
#12	La Salle	3–13	8–21	1–0 vs. Bona
#13	St. Bonaventure	3–13	8–21	0–1 vs. LAS
#14	Rhode Island	1–15	3–26	

== Schedule ==
Session	Game	Time*	Matchup^{#}	Television	Attendance
First round - Tuesday, February 27
1		7:00 PM	No. 9 Davidson at No. 8 Richmond	A10 Net	451
2		7:00 PM	No. 13 St. Bonaventure at No. 4 George Mason	A10 Net	1,115
3		7:00 PM	No. 12 La Salle at No. 5 George Washington	A10 Net	472
4		8:00 PM	No. 10 UMass at No. 7 Saint Louis	A10 Net	543
5		7:00 PM	No. 14 Rhode Island at No. 3 Fordham	A10 Net	662
6		7:00 PM	No. 11 VCU at No. 6 Saint Joseph's	A10 Net	543
Quarterfinals - Friday, March 2
7	7	11:00 am	No. 8 Richmond vs. No. 1 Dayton	A10 Net	2,954
7	8	2:00 pm	No. 5 George Washington vs. No. 4 George Mason	A10 Net	2,954
8	9	4:30 pm	No. 7 Saint Louis vs. No. 2 Duquesne	A10 Net	2,954
8	10	7:00 pm	No. 6 Saint Joseph's vs. No. 3 Fordham	A10 Net	2,954
Semifinals - Saturday, March 3
9	11	11:00 am	No. 1 Dayton vs. No. 5 George Washington	CBSSN	1,709
9	12	1:30 pm	No. 7 Saint Louis vs. No. 6 Saint Joseph's	CBSSN	1,709
Championship - Sunday, March 4
10	13	12:00 pm	No. 5 George Washington vs. No. 6 Saint Joseph's	ESPNU	2,103

*Game times in Eastern Time. #Rankings denote tournament seeding.

== Bracket ==
- All times are Eastern.

First round Campus Sites; February 27; A-10 Network; 7PM; 7PM; 7PM; 8PM; 7PM; 7PM
8	Richmond	62
9	Davidson	53
5	George Washington	69
12	La Salle	49
4	George Mason	89
13	St. Bonaventure	79
6	Saint Joseph's	72
11	VCU	63
3	Fordham	75
14	Rhode Island	53
7	Saint Louis	70
10	UMass	64

Quarterfinals; Richmond Coliseum; March 2 A-10 Network; 11AM; 2PM; 4:30PM; 7PM
1	Dayton	67
8	Richmond	58
5	George Washington	64
4	George Mason	59
6	Saint Joseph's	52
3	Fordham	49
7	Saint Louis	71
2	Duquesne	65

Semifinals; Richmond Coliseum; March 3 CBS Sports Network; 11AM; 1:30PM
1	Dayton	53
5	George Washington	58
6	Saint Joseph's	58
7	Saint Louis	49

Championship; Richmond Coliseum; March 4 ESPN U 12PM
5	George Washington	65
6	Saint Joseph's	49

== See also ==
2018 Atlantic 10 men's basketball tournament
