= 2017–18 St. Bonaventure Bonnies women's basketball team =

Intercollegiate basketball season

2017–18 St. Bonaventure Bonnies women's basketball
- Conference: Atlantic 10 Conference
- Record: 8–22 (3–13 A-10)
- Head coach: Jesse Fleming (2nd season)
- Assistant coaches: Andrea Mulcahy; Maggie Serratelli; Jennifer Pruett
- Home arena: Reilly Center

2017–18 Atlantic 10 women's basketball standings
	Conf.				Overall
Team	W		L	PCT	W		L	PCT
Dayton	15	–	1	.938	23	–	7	.767
Duquesne	13	–	3	.813	25	–	8	.758
Fordham	12	–	4	.750	24	–	10	.706
George Mason	11	–	5	.688	24	–	10	.706
George Washington †	10	–	6	.625	19	–	14	.576
Saint Joseph's	10	–	6	.625	19	–	15	.559
Saint Louis	9	–	7	.563	17	–	16	.515
Richmond	8	–	8	.500	14	–	17	.452
Davidson	7	–	9	.438	12	–	18	.400
UMass	6	–	10	.375	14	–	16	.467
La Salle	3	–	13	.188	8	–	22	.267
St. Bonaventure	3	–	13	.188	8	–	22	.267
VCU	4	–	12	.250	7	–	22	.241
Rhode Island	1	–	15	.063	3	–	27	.100
† 2018 A10 Tournament winner As of 22 March 2018; Rankings from AP poll

The 2017–18 St. Bonaventure Bonnies women's basketball team represented the St. Bonaventure University during the 2017–18 NCAA Division I women's basketball season. The Bonnies, led by second year head coach Jesse Fleming, played their home games at Reilly Center and were members of the Atlantic 10 Conference. They finished the season 8–22, 3–13 in A-10 play to finish in a tie for eleventh place. They lost in the first round of the A-10 women's tournament to George Mason.

== Media ==
All non-televised Bonnies home games air on the A-10 Digital Network. WGWE continue to be the radio broadcaster for the team. Chris Russell is the team's play-by-play voice; no color commentator is used.

== Roster ==
2017–18 St. Bonaventure Bonnies women's basketball team
Players
Coaches

Pos.	#	Name	Height	Year	Previous school	Hometown
G	1	Keely Fresh	5 ft 8 in (1.73 m)	RS So	Rockbridge County	Lexington, VA
G	2	Mariah Ruff	5 ft 9 in (1.75 m)	Sr	Oneonta	Oneonta, NY
G	3	Danielle Migliore	5 ft 7 in (1.7 m)	So	Frankfort-Schuyler	Frankfort, NY
G	4	Jalisha Terry	5 ft 6 in (1.68 m)	So	Hamady	Flint, Mich
G	10	McKenna Maycock	5 ft 9 in (1.75 m)	Jr	Randolph	Randolph, NY
F	15	Emily Calabrese	6 ft 0 in (1.83 m)	Fr	Ramapo	Wyckoff, NJ
F	23	Arielle Harvey	6 ft 0 in (1.83 m)	Jr	South Gwinnett; Daytona State	Atlanta, GA
G/F	24	Bree Paulson	6 ft 0 in (1.83 m)	Jr	Legacy; Western Nebraska CC	Broomfield, CO
G	32	Rhianna Council	5 ft 11 in (1.8 m)	So	Northern	Durham, NC
F	33	Abigail Johnson	6 ft 2 in (1.88 m)	Fr	Barking Abbey	London, England
G		Dajah Logan (redshirt)	5 ft 11 in (1.8 m)	Jr	McDonogh; College of Charleston	Randallstown, MD

Head coach

- Jesse Fleming (St. Bonaventure)

Assistant coach(es)

- Andrea Mulcahy (St. Bonaventure)
- Maggie Serratelli (Holy Family)
- Jennifer Pruett (Ohio)

Legend

- (C) Team captain
- (S) Suspended
- (I) Ineligible
- (W) Walk-on
- Injured
- Current redshirt

Roster
Last update: December 14, 2017

== Schedule ==
Date time, TV	Rank^{#}	Opponent^{#}	Result	Record	Site (attendance) city, state
Exhibition
11/04/2017*; 5:00 pm		Edinboro	L 64–67		Reilly Center; Olean, NY
Non-conference regular season
11/10/2017*; 5:30 pm		Niagara	W 76–58	1–0	Reilly Center (1,571); Olean, NY
11/12/2017*; 2:00 pm		at Siena; Franciscan Cup	L 62–70	1–1	Alumni Recreation Center (1,161); Loudonville, NY
11/15/2017*; 7:00 pm		at Canisius	L 69–71 ^{OT}	1–2	Koessler Athletic Center (835); Buffalo, NY
11/18/2017*; 1:30 pm		Eastern Michigan	W 70–51	2–2	Reilly Center (924); Olean, NY
11/21/2017*; 6:00 pm		at Bucknell	W 59–48	3–2	Sojka Pavilion (621); Lewisburg, PA
11/25/2017*; 1:00 pm		vs. UMBC; Navy Classic semifinals	W 63–54	4–2	Alumni Hall (378); Annapolis, MD
11/26/2017*; 3:15 pm		at Navy; Navy Classic championship	L 48–86	4–3	Alumni Hall (215); Annapolis, MD
11/29/2017*; 7:00 pm		Delaware	L 52–53	4–4	Reilly Center (953); Olean, NY
12/04/2017*; 7:00 pm		Toledo	L 38–59	4–5	Reilly Center (794); Olean, NY
12/09/2017*; 7:00 pm		Penn State	W 65–62	5–5	Reilly Center (1,059); Olean, NY
12/15/2017*; 7:00 pm		Buffalo	L 59–76	5–6	Reilly Center (876); Olean, NY
12/17/2017*; 2:00 pm		at Albany	L 52–69	5–7	SEFCU Arena (979); Buffalo, NY
12/21/2017*; 2:00 pm		at Hofstra	L 68–71	5–8	Hofstra Arena (265); Hempstead, NY
Atlantic 10 regular season
12/31/2017; 3:00 pm		at Saint Louis	L 55–78	5–9 (0–1)	Chaifetz Arena (1,709); St. Louis, MO
01/03/2018; 7:00 pm		Saint Joseph's	L 64–70	5–10 (0–2)	Reilly Center (743); Olean, NY
01/06/2018; 11:00 am, CBSSN		UMass	W 69–59	6–10 (1–2)	Reilly Center (934); Olean, NY
01/10/2018; 7:00 pm		at Dayton	L 59–80	6–11 (1–3)	UD Arena (2,189); Dayton, OH
01/13/2018; 1:00 pm		at La Salle	L 63–66	6–12 (1–4)	Tom Gola Arena (330); Philadelphia, PA
01/17/2018; 7:00 pm		Rhode Island	W 81–70	7–12 (2–4)	Reilly Center (821); Olean, NY
01/20/2018; 2:00 pm		Davidson	L 68–75	7–13 (2–5)	Reilly Center (975); Olean, NY
01/25/2018; 7:00 pm		at Fordham	L 48–72	7–14 (2–6)	Rose Hill Gymnasium (801); Bronx, NY
01/28/2018; 4:00 pm, NBCSN		at Duquesne	L 59–73	7–15 (2–7)	Palumbo Center (1,421); Pittsburgh, PA
01/31/2018; 7:00 pm		George Mason	L 63–76	7–16 (2–8)	Reilly Center (928); Olean, NY
02/04/2018; 1:00 pm		George Washington	L 56–63	7–17 (2–9)	Reilly Center (1,009); Olean, NY
02/11/2018; 1:00 pm		at VCU	L 75–77 ^{OT}	7–18 (2–10)	Siegel Center (1,008); Richmond, VA
02/14/2018; 7:00 pm		Richmond	L 57–79	7–19 (2–11)	Reilly Center (793); Olean, NY
02/18/2018; 2:00 pm		at George Mason	L 63–78	7–20 (2–12)	EagleBank Arena (1,544); Fairfax, VA
02/21/2018; 7:00 pm		at Rhode Island	W 77–72	8–20 (3–12)	Ryan Center (473); Kingston, RI
02/24/2018; 2:00 pm		Duquesne	L 73–76	8–21 (3–13)	Reilly Center (921); Olean, NY
Atlantic 10 Tournament
02/27/2018; 7:00 pm	(13)	at (4) George Mason; First Round	L 79–89	8–22	EagleBank Arena (1,115); Fairfax, VA
*Non-conference game. ^{#}Rankings from AP Poll. (#) Tournament seedings in parentheses. All times are in Eastern Time.

== Rankings ==
2017–18 NCAA Division I women's basketball rankings

+ Regular season polls	Poll	Pre- Season	Week 2	Week 3	Week 4	Week 5	Week 6	Week 7	Week 8	Week 9	Week 10	Week 11	Week 12	Week 13	Week 14	Week 15	Week 16	Week 17	Week 18	Week 19	Final
AP																				N/A	
Coaches																					

Legend
	Increase in ranking
	Decrease in ranking
	No change
(RV)	Received votes
(NR)	Not ranked

== See also ==
- 2017–18 St. Bonaventure Bonnies men's basketball team
