= 2017–18 Saint Louis Billikens women's basketball team =

Intercollegiate basketball season

2017–18 Saint Louis Billikens women's basketball
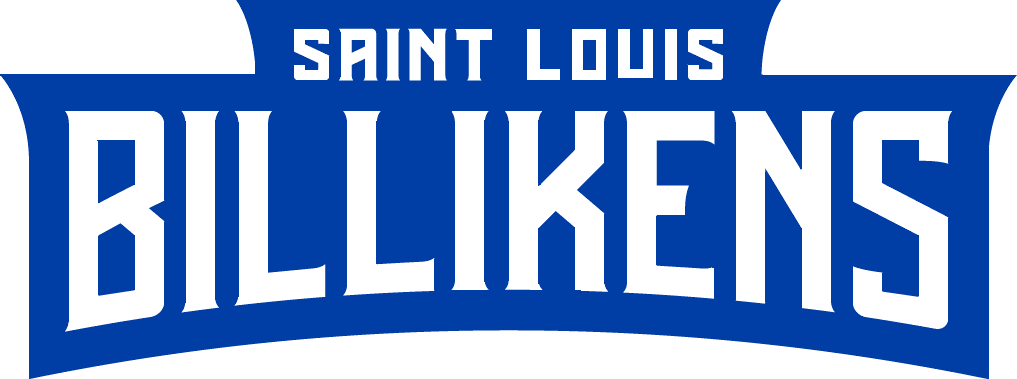

WNIT, First Round
- Conference: Atlantic 10 Conference
- Record: 17–16 (9–7 A-10)
- Head coach: Lisa Stone (6th season)
- Assistant coaches: Mike Geary; Ty Margenthaler; Jordann Reese
- Home arena: Chaifetz Arena

2017–18 Atlantic 10 women's basketball standings
	Conf.				Overall
Team	W		L	PCT	W		L	PCT
Dayton	15	–	1	.938	23	–	7	.767
Duquesne	13	–	3	.813	25	–	8	.758
Fordham	12	–	4	.750	24	–	10	.706
George Mason	11	–	5	.688	24	–	10	.706
George Washington †	10	–	6	.625	19	–	14	.576
Saint Joseph's	10	–	6	.625	19	–	15	.559
Saint Louis	9	–	7	.563	17	–	16	.515
Richmond	8	–	8	.500	14	–	17	.452
Davidson	7	–	9	.438	12	–	18	.400
UMass	6	–	10	.375	14	–	16	.467
La Salle	3	–	13	.188	8	–	22	.267
St. Bonaventure	3	–	13	.188	8	–	22	.267
VCU	4	–	12	.250	7	–	22	.241
Rhode Island	1	–	15	.063	3	–	27	.100
† 2018 A10 Tournament winner As of 22 March 2018; Rankings from AP poll

The 2017–18 Saint Louis Billikens women's basketball team represented the Saint Louis University during the 2017–18 NCAA Division I women's basketball season. The Billikens, led by sixth year head coach Lisa Stone, played their home games at the Chaifetz Arena and were members of the Atlantic 10 Conference. They finished the season 17–16, 9–7 in A-10 play to finish in seventh place. They advanced to the semifinals of the A-10 women's tournament, where they lost to Saint Joseph's. They received an at-large bid to the Women's National Invitation Tournament, where they lost to Kansas State in the first round.

== Media ==
All non-televised Billikens home games and conference road games stream on the A-10 Digital Network.

== Roster ==
2017–18 Saint Louis Billikens women's basketball team
Players
Coaches

Pos.	#	Name	Height	Year	Previous school	Hometown
G	3	Jackie Kemph	5 ft 7 in (1.7 m)	Sr	Rolling Meadows	Arlington Heights, IL
G	4	Kerri McMahan	5 ft 10 in (1.78 m)	RS Jr	Novi; Akron	Novi, MI
G	5	Aaliyah Covington	5 ft 11 in (1.8 m)	Sr	Edwardsville	Edwardsville, IL
F	10	Jenny Vliet	6 ft 2 in (1.88 m)	Sr	Rolling Meadows	Arlington Heights, IL
G	14	Tasia Jeffries	5 ft 8 in (1.73 m)	Fr	Butler	Louisville, KY
G	15	Paige Rakers	5 ft 11 in (1.8 m)	RS Sr	Carlyle; Michigan	Carlyle, IL
G	20	Jordyn Frantz	6 ft 0 in (1.83 m)	Jr	NorthWood	Wakarusa, IN
G	21	Ellie Taylor	5 ft 9 in (1.75 m)	Fr	H.H. Dow	Midland, MI
C	24	Amber Lindfors (redshirt)	6 ft 4 in (1.93 m)	Jr	Elk Grove; Valparaiso	Elk Grove Village, IL
G	30	Lauryn Hughes	5 ft 9 in (1.75 m)	Fr	MICDS	St. Louis, MO
F	34	Kendra Wilken	6 ft 2 in (1.88 m)	So	Breese Central	Bartelso, IL
F	42	Maddison Gits	6 ft 4 in (1.93 m)	Sr	Oregon	Fitchburg, WI
C	45	Tara Dusharm	6 ft 5 in (1.96 m)	Jr	Foley	Foley, MN
F	55	Shea Shipman	6 ft 0 in (1.83 m)	Sr	Olathe Northwest	Olathe, KS

Head coach

- Lisa Stone (Iowa)

Assistant coach(es)

- Mike Geary (Aquinas (MI))
- Ty Margenthaler (SIU Edwardsville)
- Jordann Reese (Drake)

Legend

- (C) Team captain
- (S) Suspended
- (I) Ineligible
- (W) Walk-on
- Injured
- Current redshirt

Roster
Last update: December 14, 2017

== Schedule ==
Date time, TV	Rank^{#}	Opponent^{#}	Result	Record	Site (attendance) city, state
Exhibition
11/03/2017*; 7:30 pm		Lindenwood	W 77–56		Chaifetz Arena; St. Louis, MO
Non-conference regular season
11/10/2017*; 6:00 pm		at Indiana State	W 60–59	1–0	Hulman Center (1,469); Terre Haute, IN
11/13/2017*; 4:00 pm		Loyola Marymount	L 60–62	1–1	Chaifetz Arena; St. Louis, MO
11/17/2017*; 4:00 pm		vs. Ole Miss; Maggie Dixon Classic semifinals	W 79–64	2–1	Wintrust Arena; Chicago, IL
11/18/2017*; 4:00 pm		at DePaul; Maggie Dixon Classic championship	L 78–86	2–2	Wintrust Arena (1,964); Chicago, IL
11/21/2017*; 7:00 pm		at SIU Edwardsville	L 72–79	2–3	Vadalabene Center (928); Edwardsville, IL
11/24/2017*; 10:00 pm		vs. Cleveland State; South Point Thanksgiving Shootout	W 80–64	3–3	South Point Arena; Enterprise, NV
11/25/2017*; 10:00 pm		vs. LSU; South Point Thanksgiving Shootout	L 59–71	3–4	South Point Arena; Enterprise, NV
11/29/2017*; 7:00 pm		Vanderbilt	L 69–74	3–5	Chaifetz Arena (1,687); St. Louis, MO
12/01/2017*; 7:00 pm		Little Rock	W 48–45	4–5	Chaifetz Arena (778); St. Louis, MO
12/04/2017*; 9:00 pm		at Washington State	L 63–85	4–6	Beasley Coliseum (479); Pullman, WA
12/08/2017*; 7:00 pm		at No. 17 Missouri	L 58–70	4–7	Mizzou Arena (3,470); Columbia, MO
12/17/2017*; 2:00 pm		Lipscomb	W 101–57	5–7	Chaifetz Arena (622); St. Louis, MO
12/19/2017*; 5:00 pm		Tulsa	W 77–66	6–7	Chaifetz Arena (822); St. Louis, MO
Atlantic 10 regular season
12/31/2017; 2:00 pm		St. Bonaventure	W 78–55	7–7 (1–0)	Chaifetz Arena (1,709); St. Louis, MO
01/03/2018; 6:00 pm		at Richmond	W 79–61	8–7 (2–0)	Robins Center (505); Richmond, VA
01/06/2018; 12:00 pm, CBSSN		at Fordham	L 63–66	8–8 (2–1)	Rose Hill Gymnasium; Bronx, NY
01/14/2018; 1:00 pm, ESPNU		at Dayton	L 76–101	8–9 (2–2)	UD Arena (1,837); Dayton, OH
01/18/2018; 7:00 pm		UMass	W 64–63	9–9 (3–2)	Chaifetz Arena (486); St. Louis, MO
01/21/2018; 1:00 pm		Saint Joseph's	W 96–73	10–9 (4–2)	Chaifetz Arena (6,346); St. Louis, MO
01/24/2018; 6:00 pm		at George Mason	L 72–81	10–10 (4–3)	EagleBank Arena (711); Fairfax, VA
01/27/2018; 11:00 am		at George Washington	W 72–69 ^{OT}	11–10 (5–3)	Charles E. Smith Center (757); Washington, D.C.
01/31/2018; 11:00 am, NBCSN		Fordham	W 91–85 ^{2OT}	12–10 (6–3)	Chaifetz Arena (4,320); St. Louis, MO
02/04/2018; 2:00 pm		Davidson	W 88–72	13–10 (7–3)	Chaifetz Arena (637); St. Louis, MO
02/07/2018; 6:00 pm		at La Salle	L 76–87	13–11 (7–4)	Tom Gola Arena (402); Philadelphia, PA
02/10/2018; 1:00 pm		at Rhode Island	W 70–66	14–11 (8–4)	Ryan Center (585); Kingston, RI
02/14/2018; 7:00 pm		Duquesne	L 66–76	14–12 (8–5)	Chaifetz Arena (402); St. Louis, MO
02/17/2018; 2:00 pm		George Washington	L 58–71	14–13 (8–6)	Chaifetz Arena (764); St. Louis, MO
02/21/2018; 5:00 pm		at VCU	L 84–88 ^{OT}	14–14 (8–7)	Siegel Center (646); Richmond, VA
02/24/2018; 2:00 pm		Dayton	W 85–72	15–14 (9–7)	Chaifetz Arena (4,461); St. Louis, MO
Atlantic 10 Tournament
02/27/2018; 7:00 pm	(7)	(10) UMass; First Round	W 70–64	16–14	Chaifetz Arena (543); St. Louis, MO
03/02/2018; 3:30 pm	(7)	vs. (2) Duquesne; Quarterfinals	W 71–65	17–14	Richmond Coliseum; Richmond, VA
03/03/2018; 12:30 pm, CBSSN	(7)	vs. (6) Saint Joseph's; Semifinals	L 49–58	17–15	Richmond Coliseum (1,709); Richmond, VA
WNIT
03/15/2018*; 7:00 pm		at Kansas State; First Round	L 61–75	17–16	Bramlage Coliseum (1,254); Manhattan, KS
*Non-conference game. ^{#}Rankings from AP Poll. (#) Tournament seedings in parentheses. All times are in Central Time.

== Rankings ==
2017–18 NCAA Division I women's basketball rankings

Regular season polls
Poll	Pre- season	Week 2	Week 3	Week 4	Week 5	Week 6	Week 7	Week 8	Week 9	Week 10	Week 11	Week 12	Week 13	Week 14	Week 15	Week 16	Week 17	Week 18	Week 19	Final
AP																				N/A
Coaches																				

Legend
	Increase in ranking
	Decrease in ranking
	No change
(RV)	Received votes
(NR)	Not ranked

== See also ==
- 2017–18 Saint Louis Billikens men's basketball team
