= 2017–18 Saint Joseph's Hawks women's basketball team =

Intercollegiate basketball season

2017–18 Saint Joseph's Hawks women's basketball
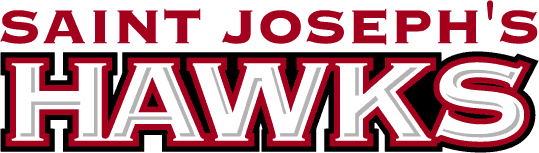

Hawk Classic Champions

WNIT, Second Round
- Conference: Atlantic 10 Conference
- Record: 19–15 (10–6 A-10)
- Head coach: Cindy Griffin (17th season)
- Assistant coaches: Susan Moran; John Hampton; Stephanie McCaffrey
- Home arena: Hagan Arena

2017–18 Atlantic 10 women's basketball standings
	Conf.				Overall
Team	W		L	PCT	W		L	PCT
Dayton	15	–	1	.938	23	–	7	.767
Duquesne	13	–	3	.813	25	–	8	.758
Fordham	12	–	4	.750	24	–	10	.706
George Mason	11	–	5	.688	24	–	10	.706
George Washington †	10	–	6	.625	19	–	14	.576
Saint Joseph's	10	–	6	.625	19	–	15	.559
Saint Louis	9	–	7	.563	17	–	16	.515
Richmond	8	–	8	.500	14	–	17	.452
Davidson	7	–	9	.438	12	–	18	.400
UMass	6	–	10	.375	14	–	16	.467
La Salle	3	–	13	.188	8	–	22	.267
St. Bonaventure	3	–	13	.188	8	–	22	.267
VCU	4	–	12	.250	7	–	22	.241
Rhode Island	1	–	15	.063	3	–	27	.100
† 2018 A10 Tournament winner As of 22 March 2018; Rankings from AP poll

The 2017–18 Saint Joseph's Hawks women's basketball team represented the Saint Joseph's University during the 2017–18 NCAA Division I women's basketball season. The Hawks, led by seventeenth year head coach Cindy Griffin, played their home games at Hagan Arena and were members of the Atlantic 10 Conference. They finished the season 19–15, 10–6 in A-10 play to finish in a tie for fifth place. They advanced to the championship game of the A-10 women's tournament, where they lost to George Washington. They received an at-large bid to the Women's National Invitation Tournament, where they defeated Seton Hall in the first round before losing to West Virginia in the second round.

== Media ==
All non-televised Hawks home games air on the A-10 Digital Network. All Hawks games are streamed via the Saint Joseph's Sports Network on sjuhawks.com.

== Roster ==
2017–18 Saint Joseph's Hawks women's basketball team
Players
Coaches

Pos.	#	Name	Height	Year	Previous school	Hometown
F	1	Whisper Fisher	6 ft 2 in (1.88 m)	RS So	Owings Mills; Loyola Chicago	Owings Mills, MD
G	2	Lula Roig	5 ft 9 in (1.75 m)	Fr	IES Costa I Llobera	Barcelona, Spain
G	3	Nailah Delinois	5 ft 9 in (1.75 m)	RS Fr	Northeast	Sunrise, FL
G	4	Kristalyn Baisden	5 ft 10 in (1.78 m)	Jr	Berkshire School	East Hartford, CT
G	11	Avery Marz	5 ft 7 in (1.7 m)	RS Jr	Wilson West Lawn	Sinking Springs, PA
G	12	Alyssa Monaghan	5 ft 5 in (1.65 m)	Jr	Bonner Prendergast	Drexel Hill, PA
G	13	Mary Sheehan	5 ft 10 in (1.78 m)	Fr	Cardinal O'Hara	Drexel Hill, PA
G	20	Katie Jekot	5 ft 9 in (1.75 m)	Fr	Cumberland Valley	Enola, PA
G	30	Sarah Veilleux	6 ft 0 in (1.83 m)	RS Jr	RHAM	Hebron, CT
G	31	Jaryn Garner	5 ft 7 in (1.7 m)	RS Sr	Germantown Academy; Virginia	Sewell, NJ
G	32	Chelsea Woods	6 ft 0 in (1.83 m)	Sr	Freire Charter	Philadelphia, PA
F	33	Adashia Franklyn	6 ft 1 in (1.85 m)	Sr	West Chester Bayard Rustin	West Chester, PA
F	34	Amanda Fioravanti	6 ft 1 in (1.85 m)	RS Sr	Our Lady of Good Counsel	Frederick, MD
F	35	Michala Clay	6 ft 0 in (1.83 m)	Jr	Roland Park Country School	Baltimore, MD
F	40	Candace Belvedere	6 ft 2 in (1.88 m)	Sr	Kellenberg Memorial	Merrick, NY

Head coach

- Cindy Griffin (Saint Joseph's)

Assistant coach(es)

- Susan Moran (Saint Joseph's)
- John Hampton (Mansfield)
- Stephanie McCaffrey (Saint Joseph's)

Legend

- (C) Team captain
- (S) Suspended
- (I) Ineligible
- (W) Walk-on
- Injured
- Current redshirt

Roster

== Schedule ==
Date time, TV	Rank^{#}	Opponent^{#}	Result	Record	Site (attendance) city, state
Non-conference regular season
11/12/2017*; 12:00 pm		at Niagara	W 93–69	1–0	Gallagher Center (463); Lewiston, NY
11/15/2017*; 6:00 pm		at Bucknell	W 77–53	2–0	Sojka Pavilion (704); Lewisburg, PA
11/19/2017*; 2:00 pm		at James Madison	W 73–66	3–0	JMU Convocation Center (1,850); Harrisonburg, VA
11/25/2017*; 2:00 pm		Eastern Illinois; Hawk Classic semifinals	W 80–62	4–0	Hagan Arena (877); Philadelphia, PA
11/26/2017*; 4:00 pm		Saint Peter's; Hawk Classic championship	W 87–58	5–0	Hagan Arena (732); Philadelphia, PA
11/29/2017*; 7:00 pm		at Temple; Rivalry	L 66–69	5–1	McGonigle Hall (1,028); Philadelphia, PA
12/03/2017*; 7:00 pm		at No. 25 Villanova; Holy War	L 44–79	5–2	Jake Nevin Field House (1,519); Villanova, PA
12/05/2017*; 7:00 pm		at Towson	L 66–90	5–3	SECU Arena (209); Towson, MD
12/11/2017*; 7:00 pm		Penn	L 50–57	5–4	Hagan Arena (913); Philadelphia, PA
12/17/2017*; 1:30 pm		Drexel	L 58–65	5–5	Hagan Arena (3,551); Philadelphia, PA
12/20/2017*; 2:30 pm		vs. Princeton; Gator Holiday Classic	L 54–63	5–6	O'Connell Center (1,054); Gainesville, FL
12/21/2017*; 12:00 pm		at Florida; Gator Holiday Classic	L 51–71	5–7	O'Connell Center (1,008); Gainesville, FL
Atlantic 10 regular season
12/31/2017; 2:00 pm		VCU	W 79–41	6–7 (1–0)	Hagan Arena (711); Philadelphia, PA
01/03/2018; 7:00 pm		at St. Bonaventure	W 70–64	7–7 (2–0)	Reilly Center (743); Olean, NY
01/07/2018; 2:00 pm		Dayton	L 59–65	7–8 (2–1)	Hagan Arena (747); Philadelphia, PA
01/10/2018; 12:00 pm, NBCSN		Richmond	W 81–72	8–8 (3–1)	Hagan Arena (681); Philadelphia, PA
01/13/2018; 2:00 pm		at UMass	W 84–79	9–8 (4–1)	Mullins Center (536); Amherst, MA
01/21/2018; 2:00 pm		at Saint Louis	L 73–96	9–9 (4–2)	Chaifetz Arena (6,346); St. Louis, MO
01/24/2018; 7:00 pm		Duquesne	L 42–61	9–10 (4–3)	Hagan Arena (543); Philadelphia, PA
01/28/2018; 1:00 pm		at La Salle	W 75–64	10–10 (5–3)	Tom Gola Arena (427); Philadelphia, PA
01/31/2018; 6:00 pm		at VCU	L 54–56	10–11 (5–4)	Siegel Center (541); Richmond, VA
02/04/2018; 4:00 pm, CBSSN		George Mason	L 57–65	10–12 (5–5)	Hagan Arena (343); Philadelphia, PA
02/07/2018; 7:00 pm		Rhode Island	W 64–46	11–12 (6–5)	Hagan Arena (346); Philadelphia, PA
02/10/2018; 2:30 pm		at Duquesne	W 69–50	12–12 (7–5)	Palumbo Center (711); Pittsburgh, PA
02/14/2018; 7:00 pm		at Davidson	W 64–62	13–12 (8–5)	John M. Belk Arena (321); Davidson, NC
02/17/2018; 1:00 pm		La Salle	W 70–49	14–12 (9–5)	Hagan Arena (913); Philadelphia, PA
02/20/2018; 7:00 pm		George Washington	L 46–49	14–13 (9–6)	Hagan Arena (551); Philadelphia, PA
02/24/2018; 2:00 pm		at Fordham	W 52–50	15–13 (10–6)	Rose Hill Gymnasium (2,366); Bronx, NY
Atlantic 10 Women's Tournament
02/27/2018; 7:00 pm	(6)	(11) VCU; First Round	W 72–63	16–13	Hagan Arena (516); Philadelphia, PA
03/02/2018; 7:00 pm	(6)	vs. (3) Fordham; Quarterfinals	W 52–49	17–13	Richmond Coliseum; Richmond, VA
03/03/2018; 1:30 pm, CBSSN	(6)	vs. (7) Saint Louis; Semifinals	W 58–49	18–13	Richmond Coliseum (1,709); Richmond, VA
03/04/2018; 1:00 pm, ESPNU	(6)	vs. (5) George Washington; Championship Game	L 49–65	18–14	Richmond Coliseum (2,103); Richmond, VA
WNIT
02/14/2018*; 7:00 pm		at Seton Hall; First Round	W 75–57	19–14	Walsh Gymnasium (281); South Orange, NJ
02/18/2018*; 2:00 pm		at West Virginia; Second Round	L 51–79	19–15	WVU Coliseum (1,651); Morgantown, WV
*Non-conference game. ^{#}Rankings from AP Poll. (#) Tournament seedings in parentheses. All times are in Eastern Time.

== Rankings ==
2017–18 NCAA Division I women's basketball rankings

Regular season polls
Poll	Pre- Season	Week 2	Week 3	Week 4	Week 5	Week 6	Week 7	Week 8	Week 9	Week 10	Week 11	Week 12	Week 13	Week 14	Week 15	Week 16	Week 17	Week 18	Week 19	Final
AP																				N/A
Coaches																				

Legend
	Increase in ranking
	Decrease in ranking
	No change
(RV)	Received votes
(NR)	Not ranked

== See also ==
- 2017–18 Saint Joseph's Hawks men's basketball team
