= 2017–18 VCU Rams women's basketball team =

Intercollegiate basketball season

2017–18 VCU Rams women's basketball
- Conference: Atlantic 10 Conference
- Record: 7–22 (3–13 A-10)
- Head coach: Beth O'Boyle (4th season)
- Assistant coaches: Karen Blair; Nerlande Nicolas; Kirk Crawford
- Home arena: Siegel Center

2017–18 Atlantic 10 women's basketball standings
| | Conf. | | | | Overall |
| Team | W | | L | PCT | W | | L | PCT |
|---|---|---|---|---|---|---|---|---|
| Dayton | 15 | – | 1 | .938 | 23 | – | 7 | .767 |
| Duquesne | 13 | – | 3 | .813 | 25 | – | 8 | .758 |
| Fordham | 12 | – | 4 | .750 | 24 | – | 10 | .706 |
| George Mason | 11 | – | 5 | .688 | 24 | – | 10 | .706 |
| George Washington † | 10 | – | 6 | .625 | 19 | – | 14 | .576 |
| Saint Joseph's | 10 | – | 6 | .625 | 19 | – | 15 | .559 |
| Saint Louis | 9 | – | 7 | .563 | 17 | – | 16 | .515 |
| Richmond | 8 | – | 8 | .500 | 14 | – | 17 | .452 |
| Davidson | 7 | – | 9 | .438 | 12 | – | 18 | .400 |
| UMass | 6 | – | 10 | .375 | 14 | – | 16 | .467 |
| La Salle | 3 | – | 13 | .188 | 8 | – | 22 | .267 |
| St. Bonaventure | 3 | – | 13 | .188 | 8 | – | 22 | .267 |
| VCU | 4 | – | 12 | .250 | 7 | – | 22 | .241 |
| Rhode Island | 1 | – | 15 | .063 | 3 | – | 27 | .100 |
† 2018 A10 Tournament winner As of 22 March 2018; Rankings from AP poll

The 2017–18 VCU Rams women's basketball team represented Virginia Commonwealth University during the 2017–18 NCAA Division I women's basketball season. The Rams were led by fourth year head coach Beth O'Boyle. The Rams were members of the Atlantic 10 Conference and played their home games at the Stuart C. Siegel Center. They finished the season 7–23, 8–8 in A-10 play to finish in thirteenth place. They lost in the first round of the A-10 women's tournament Saint Joseph's.

== Roster ==
2017–18 VCU Rams women's basketball team
Players
Coaches

| Pos. | # | Name | Height | Year | Previous school | Hometown |
|---|---|---|---|---|---|---|
| G | 1 | Taya Robinson | 5 ft 10 in (1.78 m) | Fr | Huguenot | Richmond, VA |
| G | 3 | Madison Hattix-Covington | 5 ft 10 in (1.78 m) | Fr | Ellison | Killeen, TX |
| G | 12 | Olga Petrova | 5 ft 8 in (1.73 m) | Fr | None | Moscow, Russia |
| G | 20 | Jailyn Maddox | 5 ft 10 in (1.78 m) | So | Hoover | Hoover, AL |
| G | 21 | Delphynia Sparks | 5 ft 8 in (1.73 m) | Fr | Monsignor Scanlan | Bronx, NY |
| F | 22 | Sydnei Archie | 5 ft 10 in (1.78 m) | Fr | St. Catherine's | Richmond, VA |
| F | 23 | Sandra Skinner | 6 ft 1 in (1.85 m) | Jr | George Rogers Clark | Winchester, KY |
| G | 24 | Tera Reed | 6 ft 0 in (1.83 m) | Fr | Life Center Academy | New Zealand |
| C | 30 | Danielle Hammond | 6 ft 4 in (1.93 m) | So | Baldwin School | Philadelphia, PA |
| F | 32 | Bria Gibson | 6 ft 1 in (1.85 m) | Jr | Sanderson | Columbia, MD |
| G | 34 | Nyra Williams | 5 ft 5 in (1.65 m) | So | Bethel | Hampton, VA |
| G | 35 | Jordan Agustus (redshirt) | 6 ft 0 in (1.83 m) | So | Saint Mary's; St. John's | Bronx, NY |
| G | 42 | Niya Johnson | 5 ft 8 in (1.73 m) | RS Fr | Nazareth | Brooklyn, NY |

Head coach

- Beth O'Boyle (Gettysburg)

Assistant coach(es)

- Karen Blair (SMU)
- Nerlande Nicholas (Rutgers–Newark)
- Kirk Crawford (Western Colorado)

Legend

- (C) Team captain
- (S) Suspended
- (I) Ineligible
- (W) Walk-on
- Injured
- Current redshirt

Roster
Last update: December 14, 2017

== Schedule ==
| Date time, TV | Rank^{#} | Opponent^{#} | Result | Record | Site (attendance) city, state |
Non-conference regular season
| 11/12/2017*; 1:00 pm | | Norfolk State | L 52–66 | 0–1 | Siegel Center (923); Richmond, VA |
| 11/16/2017*; 8:00 pm | | at Minnesota | L 63–108 | 0–2 | Williams Arena (2,147); Minneapolis, MN |
| 11/21/2017*; 5:30 pm | | at UNC Greensboro | L 61–74 | 0–3 | Fleming Gymnasium (426); Greensboro, NC |
| 11/24/2017*; 4:00 pm, ESPN3 | | at Georgia State; GSU Thanksgiving Classic | L 56–61 | 0–4 | GSU Sports Arena (442); Atlanta, GA |
| 11/26/2017*; 5:00 pm | | vs. Mercer; GSU Thanksgiving Classic | L 54–70 | 0–5 | GSU Sports Arena (331); Atlanta, GA |
| 11/29/2017*; 7:00 pm | | at UNC Wilmington | L 67–83 | 0–6 | Trask Coliseum (856); Wilmington, NC |
| 12/06/2017*; 6:00 pm | | Old Dominion; Rivalry | W 68–39 | 1–6 | Siegel Center (664); Richmond, VA |
| 12/10/2017*; 2:00 pm | | at Radford | L 62–79 | 1–7 | Dedmon Center (644); Radford, VA |
| 12/18/2017*; 6:00 pm | | Coppin State | W 62–47 | 2–7 | Siegel Center (611); Richmond, VA |
| 12/21/2017*; 6:00 pm | | Georgetown | L 59–71 | 2–8 | Siegel Center (922); Richmond, VA |
| 12/28/2017*; 7:00 pm | | vs. Penn; NJIT Highlanders Christmas Tournament semifinals | L 52–82 | 2–9 | Wellness and Events Center (371); Newark, NJ |
| 12/29/2017*; 3:00 pm | | vs. Long Beach State; NJIT Highlanders Christmas Tournament 3rd place game | W 69–59 | 3–9 | Wellness and Events Center (210); Newark, NJ |
A-10 regular season
| 12/31/2017; 2:00 pm | | at Saint Joseph's | L 41–79 | 3–10 (0–1) | Hagan Arena (711); Philadelphia, PA |
| 01/03/2018; 6:00 pm | | George Washington | L 39–61 | 3–11 (0–2) | Siegel Center (702); Richmond, VA |
| 01/07/2018; 1:00 pm | | Duquesne | L 51–70 | 3–12 (0–3) | Siegel Center (540); Richmond, VA |
| 01/10/2018; 7:00 pm | | at Rhode Island | W 61–49 | 4–12 (1–3) | Ryan Center (243); Kingston, RI |
| 01/14/2018; 1:00 pm | | Fordham | L 54–64 | 4–13 (1–4) | Siegel Center (619); Richmond, VA |
| 01/21/2018; 2:00 pm | | at UMass | L 75–79 | 4–14 (1–5) | Mullins Center (564); Amherst, MA |
| 01/25/2018; 12:00 pm | | at La Salle | L 57–62 | 4–15 (1–6) | Tom Gola Arena (1,600); Philadelphia, PA |
| 01/28/2018; 7:00 pm | | Richmond; Sonabank/P.O.W.E.R. Crosstown Showdown | L 68–77 | 4–16 (1–7) | Siegel Center (1,856); Richmond, VA |
| 01/31/2018; 6:00 pm | | Saint Joseph's | W 56–54 | 5–16 (2–7) | Siegel Center (541); Richmond, VA |
| 02/04/2018; 2:00 pm, CBSSN | | at Dayton | L 64–74 | 5–17 (2–8) | UD Arena (2,627); Dayton, OH |
| 02/07/2018; 7:00 pm | | at Duquesne | L 71–80 | 5–18 (2–9) | Palumbo Center (583); Pittsburgh, PA |
| 02/11/2018; 1:00 pm | | St. Bonaventure | W 77–75 ^{OT} | 6–18 (3–9) | Siegel Center (1,008); Richmond, VA |
| 02/15/2018; 11:00 am | | George Mason; Rivalry | L 42–65 | 6–19 (3–10) | Siegel Center (2,219); Richmond, VA |
| 02/18/2018; 3:00 pm | | at Richmond; Sonabank/P.O.W.E.R. Crosstown Showdown | L 54–59 | 6–20 (3–11) | Robins Center (1,302); Richmond, VA |
| 02/21/2018; 6:00 pm | | Saint Louis | W 88–84 ^{OT} | 7–20 (4–11) | Siegel Center (646); Richmond, VA |
| 02/24/2018; 2:00 pm | | at Davidson | L 63–69 | 7–21 (4–12) | John M. Belk Arena (871); Davidson, NC |
Atlantic 10 Women's Tournament
| 02/27/2018; 7:00 pm | (11) | at (6) Saint Joseph's; First Round | L 63–72 | 7–22 | Hagan Arena (516); Philadelphia, PA |
*Non-conference game. ^{#}Rankings from AP Poll. (#) Tournament seedings in parentheses. All times are in Eastern Time.

== Rankings ==
2017–18 NCAA Division I women's basketball rankings

Regular season polls
| Poll | Pre- Season | Week 2 | Week 3 | Week 4 | Week 5 | Week 6 | Week 7 | Week 8 | Week 9 | Week 10 | Week 11 | Week 12 | Week 13 | Week 14 | Week 15 | Week 16 | Week 17 | Week 18 | Week 19 | Final |
|---|---|---|---|---|---|---|---|---|---|---|---|---|---|---|---|---|---|---|---|---|
| AP | | | | | | | | | | | | | | | | | | | | N/A |
| Coaches | | | | | | | | | | | | | | | | | | | | |

Legend
| | Increase in ranking |
| | Decrease in ranking |
| | No change |
| (RV) | Received votes |
| (NR) | Not ranked |

== See also ==
- 2017–18 VCU Rams men's basketball team
