= 2017–18 La Salle Explorers women's basketball team =

Intercollegiate basketball season

2017–18 La Salle Explorers women's basketball
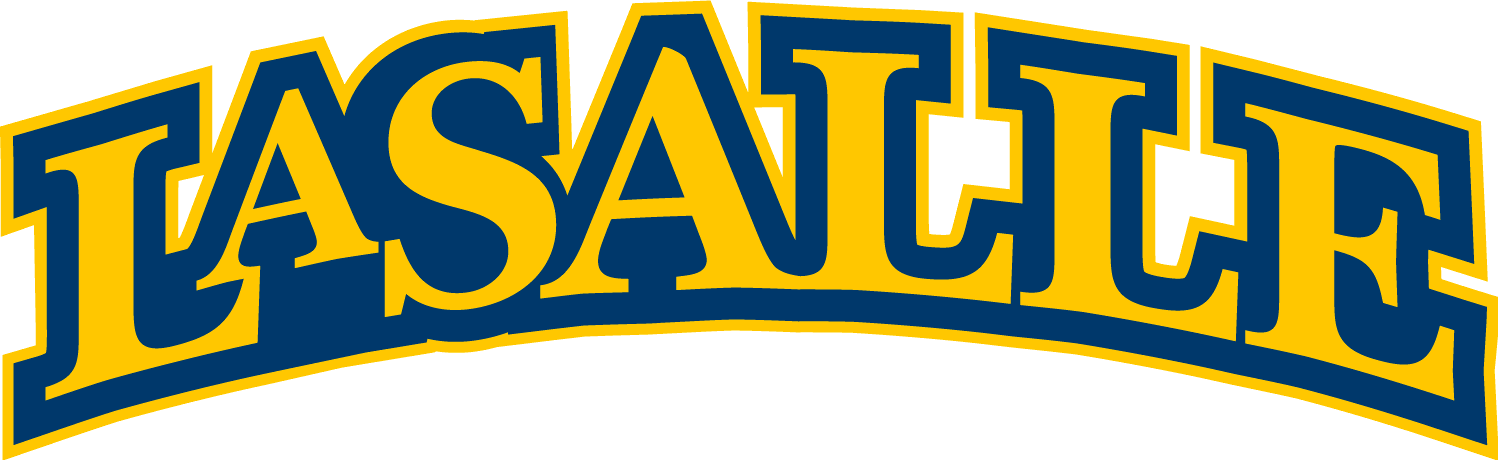

Christmas City Classic Champions
- Conference: Atlantic 10 Conference
- Record: 8–22 (3–13 A-10)
- Head coach: Jeff Williams (8th season)
- Assistant coaches: Kamela Gissendanner; Dalila Eshe; Khadijah Rushdan
- Home arena: Tom Gola Arena

2017–18 Atlantic 10 women's basketball standings
| | Conf. | | | | Overall |
| Team | W | | L | PCT | W | | L | PCT |
|---|---|---|---|---|---|---|---|---|
| Dayton | 15 | – | 1 | .938 | 23 | – | 7 | .767 |
| Duquesne | 13 | – | 3 | .813 | 25 | – | 8 | .758 |
| Fordham | 12 | – | 4 | .750 | 24 | – | 10 | .706 |
| George Mason | 11 | – | 5 | .688 | 24 | – | 10 | .706 |
| George Washington † | 10 | – | 6 | .625 | 19 | – | 14 | .576 |
| Saint Joseph's | 10 | – | 6 | .625 | 19 | – | 15 | .559 |
| Saint Louis | 9 | – | 7 | .563 | 17 | – | 16 | .515 |
| Richmond | 8 | – | 8 | .500 | 14 | – | 17 | .452 |
| Davidson | 7 | – | 9 | .438 | 12 | – | 18 | .400 |
| UMass | 6 | – | 10 | .375 | 14 | – | 16 | .467 |
| La Salle | 3 | – | 13 | .188 | 8 | – | 22 | .267 |
| St. Bonaventure | 3 | – | 13 | .188 | 8 | – | 22 | .267 |
| VCU | 4 | – | 12 | .250 | 7 | – | 22 | .241 |
| Rhode Island | 1 | – | 15 | .063 | 3 | – | 27 | .100 |
† 2018 A10 Tournament winner As of 22 March 2018; Rankings from AP poll

The 2017–18 La Salle Explorers women's basketball team represented La Salle University during the 2017–18 NCAA Division I women's basketball season. The Explorers, led by eighth year head coach Jeff Williams, played their home games at Tom Gola Arena and were members of the Atlantic 10 Conference. They finished the season 8–22, 3–13 in A-10 play to finish in a tie for eleventh place. They lost in the first round of the A-10 women's tournament to George Washington.

On March 2, Jeff Williams's contract was not renewed. He finished at La Salle with an 8-year record of 92–149.

== Media ==
=== La Salle Explorers Sports Network ===
Select Explorers games will be broadcast online by the La Salle Portal. The A-10 Digital Network will carry all non-televised Explorers home games and most conference road games.

== Roster ==
2017–18 La Salle Explorers women's basketball team
Players
Coaches

| Pos. | # | Name | Height | Year | Previous school | Hometown |
|---|---|---|---|---|---|---|
| G | 1 | Shaquana Edwards | 5 ft 5 in (1.65 m) | RS Fr | Weaver | Hartford, CT |
| G | 3 | Rayshel Brown | 5 ft 8 in (1.73 m) | Fr | Curtis | Staten Island, NY |
| F/C | 5 | Amber Wilks | 6 ft 3 in (1.91 m) | RS So | Walnut Hills | Cincinnati, OH |
| G | 11 | Deja King | 5 ft 7 in (1.7 m) | Fr | Life Center Academy | Trenton, NJ |
| G/F | 12 | Iyonna Crenshaw | 6 ft 0 in (1.83 m) | RS Jr | Neptune | Neptune, NJ |
| G/F | 14 | Michelle Nicholls | 5 ft 9 in (1.75 m) | Fr | Life Center Academy | Auckland, New Zealand |
| G | 15 | Adreana Miller | 5 ft 11 in (1.8 m) | Jr | Franklin | Somerset, NJ |
| G/F | 21 | Amy Griffin | 6 ft 1 in (1.85 m) | Sr | Southwest Atlanta Christian | Atlanta, GA |
| F | 22 | Jeryn Reese | 6 ft 0 in (1.83 m) | Jr | Mansfield; Owens CC | Mansfield, OH |
| F/C | 25 | Shalina Miller | 6 ft 2 in (1.88 m) | So | Archbishop Prendergast | Philadelphia, PA |
| F | 32 | Jasmine White | 6 ft 1 in (1.85 m) | Fr | St. Anthony's | Huntington, NY |
| C | 35 | Sofilia Ngwafang | 6 ft 4 in (1.93 m) | So | Paint Branch | Silver Spring, MD |
| F | 44 | Ashanti Freeland | 6 ft 3 in (1.91 m) | Sr | Gwynn Park | Brandywine, MD |

Head coach

- Jeff Williams (Howard)

Assistant coach(es)

- Kam Gissendanner (Penn State)
- Dalila Eshe (Florida)
- Khadijah Rushdan (Rutgers)

Legend

- (C) Team captain
- (S) Suspended
- (I) Ineligible
- (W) Walk-on
- Injured
- Current redshirt

Roster

== Schedule ==
| Date time, TV | Rank^{#} | Opponent^{#} | Result | Record | Site (attendance) city, state |
Regular season
| 11/10/2017*; 7:00 pm | | at Lafayette | W 74–47 | 1–0 | Kirby Sports Center (644); Easton, PA |
| 11/13/2017*; 7:00 pm | | at American | L 48–66 | 1–1 | Bender Arena (390); Washington, D.C. |
| 11/16/2017*; 7:00 pm | | at Drexel | L 54–79 | 1–2 | Daskalakis Athletic Center (692); Philadelphia, PA |
| 11/22/2017*; 1:00 pm | | Temple | L 52–69 | 1–3 | Tom Gola Arena (356); Philadelphia, PA |
| 11/25/2017*; 4:30 pm | | vs. New Hampshire; Christmas City Classic semifinals | W 59–51 | 2–3 | Stabler Arena (671); Bethlehem, PA |
| 11/26/2017*; 4:30 pm | | at Lehigh; Christmas City Classic championship | W 69–61 | 3–3 | Stabler Arena (544); Bethlehem, PA |
| 11/29/2017*; 7:00 pm | | Penn | W 66–59 | 4–3 | Tom Gola Arena (573); Philadelphia, PA |
| 12/02/2017*; 12:00 pm | | at Wisconsin | L 60–71 | 4–4 | Kohl Center (3,771); Madison, WI |
| 12/06/2017*; 7:00 pm | | Rider | L 55–76 | 4–5 | Tom Gola Arena (380); Philadelphia, PA |
| 12/09/2017*; 4:00 pm | | at North Texas | L 44–70 | 4–6 | The Super Pit (996); Denton, TX |
| 12/17/2017*; 6:00 pm | | at Delaware State | W 71–48 | 5–6 | Memorial Hall (317); Dover, DE |
| 12/20/2017*; 1:00 pm | | No. 20 Villanova | L 49–76 | 5–7 | Tom Gola Arena (285); Philadelphia, PA |
| 12/31/2017; 1:00 pm | | Dayton | L 47–76 | 5–8 (0–1) | Tom Gola Arena (306); Philadelphia, PA |
| 01/03/2018; 7:00 pm | | George Mason | L 56–69 | 5–9 (0–2) | Tom Gola Arena (295); Philadelphia, PA |
| 01/06/2018; 6:00 pm | | at Richmond | L 51–77 | 5–10 (0–3) | Robins Center (1,075); Richmond, VA |
| 01/10/2018*; 12:00 pm | | at Harvard | L 61–70 | 5–11 | Lavietes Pavilion (504); Cambridge, MA |
| 01/13/2018; 1:00 pm | | St. Bonaventure | W 66–63 | 6–11 (1–3) | Tom Gola Arena (330); Philadelphia, PA |
| 01/17/2018; 1:00 pm | | at Duquesne | L 50–78 | 6–12 (1–4) | Palumbo Center (670); Pittsburgh, PA |
| 01/20/2018; 11:00 am, CBSSN | | at Rhode Island | L 63–72 | 6–13 (1–5) | Ryan Center (328); Kingston, RI |
| 01/25/2018; 12:00 pm | | VCU | W 62–57 | 7–13 (2–5) | Tom Gola Arena (1,600); Philadelphia, PA |
| 01/28/2018; 1:00 pm | | Saint Joseph's | L 64–75 | 7–14 (2–6) | Tom Gola Arena (427); Philadelphia, PA |
| 02/01/2018; 7:00 pm | | at George Washington | L 45–60 | 7–15 (2–7) | Charles E. Smith Center (833); Washington, D.C. |
| 02/04/2018; 12:00 pm | | at UMass | L 66–69 | 7–16 (2–8) | Mullins Center (570); Amherst, MA |
| 02/07/2018; 7:00 pm | | Saint Louis | W 87–76 | 8–16 (3–8) | Tom Gola Arena (402); Philadelphia, PA |
| 02/10/2018; 1:00 pm | | Richmond | L 57–60 | 8–17 (3–9) | Tom Gola Arena (446); Philadelphia, PA |
| 02/13/2018; 7:00 pm | | at Fordham | L 45–66 | 8–18 (3–10) | Rose Hill Gymnasium (967); Bronx, NY |
| 02/17/2018; 1:00 pm | | at Saint Joseph's | L 49–70 | 8–19 (3–11) | Hagan Arena (913); Philadelphia, PA |
| 02/21/2018; 7:00 pm | | Davidson | L 51–58 | 8–20 (3–12) | Tom Gola Arena (550); Philadelphia, PA |
| 02/24/2018; 2:00 pm | | at George Mason | L 55–65 | 8–21 (3–13) | EagleBank Arena (1,460); Fairfax, VA |
Atlantic 10 Women's Tournament
| 02/27/2018; 7:00 pm | (12) | at (7) George Washington; First Round | L 49–69 | 8–22 | Charles E. Smith Center (472); Washington, D.C. |
*Non-conference game. ^{#}Rankings from AP Poll. (#) Tournament seedings in parentheses. All times are in Eastern Time.

== Rankings ==
2017–18 NCAA Division I women's basketball rankings

Regular season polls
| Poll | Pre- Season | Week 2 | Week 3 | Week 4 | Week 5 | Week 6 | Week 7 | Week 8 | Week 9 | Week 10 | Week 11 | Week 12 | Week 13 | Week 14 | Week 15 | Week 16 | Week 17 | Week 18 | Week 19 | Final |
|---|---|---|---|---|---|---|---|---|---|---|---|---|---|---|---|---|---|---|---|---|
| AP | | | | | | | | | | | | | | | | | | | | N/A |
| Coaches | | | | | | | | | | | | | | | | | | | | |

Legend
| | Increase in ranking |
| | Decrease in ranking |
| | No change |
| (RV) | Received votes |
| (NR) | Not ranked |

== See also ==
- 2017–18 La Salle Explorers men's basketball team
