= 2017–18 Rhode Island Rams women's basketball team =

Intercollegiate basketball season

2017–18 Rhode Island Rams women's basketball
- Conference: Atlantic 10 Conference
- Record: 3–27 (1–15 A-10)
- Head coach: Daynia La-Force (4th season)
- Assistant coaches: Marcus Reilly; Velaida Harris; Stephanie Tobey
- Home arena: Ryan Center

2017–18 Atlantic 10 women's basketball standings
	Conf.				Overall
Team	W		L	PCT	W		L	PCT
Dayton	15	–	1	.938	23	–	7	.767
Duquesne	13	–	3	.813	25	–	8	.758
Fordham	12	–	4	.750	24	–	10	.706
George Mason	11	–	5	.688	24	–	10	.706
George Washington †	10	–	6	.625	19	–	14	.576
Saint Joseph's	10	–	6	.625	19	–	15	.559
Saint Louis	9	–	7	.563	17	–	16	.515
Richmond	8	–	8	.500	14	–	17	.452
Davidson	7	–	9	.438	12	–	18	.400
UMass	6	–	10	.375	14	–	16	.467
La Salle	3	–	13	.188	8	–	22	.267
St. Bonaventure	3	–	13	.188	8	–	22	.267
VCU	4	–	12	.250	7	–	22	.241
Rhode Island	1	–	15	.063	3	–	27	.100
† 2018 A10 Tournament winner As of 22 March 2018; Rankings from AP poll

The 2017–18 Rhode Island Rams women's basketball team represented the University of Rhode Island during the 2017–18 NCAA Division I women's basketball season. The Rams, led by fourth-year head coach Daynia La-Force, were members of the Atlantic 10 (A-10) Conference and played their home games at the Ryan Center in Kingston, Rhode Island. They finished the season 3–27, 1–15 in A-10 play, to finish in last place. They lost in the first round of the A-10 women's tournament to Fordham.

== 2017–18 media ==
All Rams home games and most conference road games that were not televised were shown on the A-10 Digital Network.

== Roster ==
2017–18 Rhode Island Rams women's basketball team
Players
Coaches

Pos.	#	Name	Height	Year	Previous school	Hometown
G	0	Ednaija Lassiter	5 ft 7 in (1.7 m)	So	Newton North	Dorchester, MA
G	1	Elemy Colome	5 ft 7 in (1.7 m)	RS So	Proctor Academy; James Madison	Lawrence, MA
F	2	Jalissa Ross	6 ft 2 in (1.88 m)	Jr	Fenway	Roxbury, MA
G	3	Charise Wilson	5 ft 5 in (1.65 m)	Sr	St. Anthony's	West Babylon, NY
G	4	Laura Perez	5 ft 8 in (1.73 m)	RS So	CETYS Universidad	Baja California, Mexico
G	11	Davida Dale	5 ft 11 in (1.8 m)	RS So	St. Andrew's; Syracuse	Providence, RI
G	12	Maia Moffitt	5 ft 10 in (1.78 m)	Fr	St. Anthony's	Bay Shore, NY
G	13	Marta Vargas	5 ft 9 in (1.75 m)	Fr	Vergilio Ferreira	Amadora, Portugal
G	14	Erin Jones (redshirt)	6 ft 1 in (1.85 m)	So	Voorhees; Hartford	High Bridge, NJ
C	22	Gabrielle Green	6 ft 2 in (1.88 m)	RS Fr	Mt. Hebron	Ellicott City, MD
G	23	Kasey Gagan	5 ft 9 in (1.75 m)	Fr	St. Raphael Academy	Warwick, RI
G	31	Abby Streeter	5 ft 11 in (1.8 m)	Fr	Lawrence Academy	Nashua, NH
C	32	Nicole Jorgensen	6 ft 5 in (1.96 m)	So	Quincy	Quincy, MA
F	33	Meghan Oberg	6 ft 3 in (1.91 m)	RS Fr	Islip	Islip, NY
C	34	Dina Motrechuk	6 ft 5 in (1.96 m)	Jr	Moore Catholic	Staten Island, NY
G	35	Jessica Rogers	6 ft 1 in (1.85 m)	Fr	Rutherford	Rutherford, NJ

Head coach

- Daynia La-Force (Georgetown)

Assistant coach(es)

- Marcus Reilly (Trinity (CT))
- Stephanie Tobey (Bryant)
- Velaida Harris (Portland State)

Legend

- (C) Team captain
- (S) Suspended
- (I) Ineligible
- (W) Walk-on
- Injured
- Current redshirt

Roster
Last update: September 12, 2024

== Schedule ==
Date time, TV	Rank^{#}	Opponent^{#}	Result	Record	Site (attendance) city, state
Exhibition
November 5, 2017*; 1:00 p.m.		NYIT	W 77–76		Ryan Center; Kingston, RI
Non-conference regular season
November 10, 2017*; 5:00 p.m.		UMass Lowell	W 81–64	1–0	Ryan Center (6,367); Kingston, RI
November 13, 2017*; 7:00 p.m.		Minnesota	L 60–82	1–1	Ryan Center (310); Kingston, RI
November 17, 2017*; 7:00 p.m.		at Samford	L 37–67	1–2	Pete Hanna Center (242); Homewood, AL
November 20, 2017*; 8:00 p.m.		at Jacksonville State	L 53–63	1–3	Pete Mathews Coliseum (302); Jacksonville, AL
November 24, 2017*; 4:00 p.m.		at Dartmouth	L 54–70	1–4	Leede Arena (427); Hanover, NH
December 2, 2017*; 2:00 p.m.		vs. Bryant; Ocean State Tip-Off semifinals	L 52–58	1–5	Alumni Hall (582); Providence, RI
December 3, 2017*; 12:00 p.m.		at Providence; Ocean State Tip-Off 3rd-place game	L 41–65	1–6	Alumni Hall; Providence, RI
December 6, 2017*; 5:00 p.m.		at Marist	L 42–64	1–7	McCann Field House (1,334); Poughkeepsie, NY
December 9, 2017*; 2:00 p.m.		at Michigan State	L 38–82	1–8	Breslin Center (5,743); East Lansing, MI
December 11, 2017*; 7:00 p.m.		Fairfield	W 62–47	2–8	Ryan Center (359); Kingston, RI
December 17, 2017*; 2:00 p.m.		Holy Cross	L 63–69	2–9	Ryan Center (407); Kingston, RI
December 22, 2017*; 1:00 p.m.		at Penn	L 66–84	2–10	Palestra (456); Philadelphia, PA
December 28, 2017*; 2:00 p.m.		Southern Connecticut	L 57–62	2–11	Ryan Center (443); Kingston, RI
Atlantic 10 regular season
December 31, 2017; 2:00 p.m.		Richmond	L 53–74	2–12 (0–1)	Ryan Center (354); Kingston, RI
January 4, 2018; 7:00 p.m.		at Dayton	L 58–116	2–13 (0–2)	UD Arena (1,615); Dayton, OH
January 7, 2018; 2:00 p.m.		at Davidson	L 67–77	2–14 (0–3)	John M. Belk Arena (259); Davidson, NC
January 10, 2018; 7:00 p.m.		VCU	L 49–61	2–15 (0–4)	Ryan Center (243); Kingston, RI
January 14, 2018; 2:00 p.m.		George Mason	L 53–92	2–16 (0–5)	Ryan Center (378); Kingston, RI
January 17, 2018; 7:00 p.m.		at St. Bonaventure	L 70–81	2–17 (0–6)	Reilly Center (821); Olean, NY
January 20, 2018; 11:00 a.m., CBSSN		La Salle	W 72–63	3–17 (1–6)	Ryan Center (328); Kingston, RI
January 24, 2018; 11:00 a.m.		at George Washington	L 52–65	3–18 (1–7)	Charles E. Smith Center (1,100); Washington, D.C.
January 28, 2018; 2:00 p.m.		UMass	L 59–61	3–19 (1–8)	Ryan Center (454); Kingston, RI
January 31, 2018; 11:00 a.m.		Davidson	L 67–79	3–20 (1–9)	Ryan Center (596); Kingston, RI
February 4, 2018; 2:00 p.m.		at Fordham	L 64–76	3–21 (1–10)	Rose Hill Gymnasium (935); The Bronx, NY
February 7, 2018; 7:00 p.m.		at Saint Joseph's	L 46–64	3–22 (1–11)	Hagan Arena (346); Philadelphia, PA
February 10, 2018; 2:00 p.m.		Saint Louis	L 66–70	3–23 (1–12)	Ryan Center (585); Kingston, RI
February 17, 2018; 2:00 p.m.		at Duquesne	L 71–80	3–24 (1–13)	Palumbo Center (948); Pittsburgh, PA
February 21, 2018; 7:00 p.m.		St. Bonaventure	L 72–77	3–25 (1–14)	Ryan Center (473); Kingston, RI
February 24, 2018; 12:00 p.m.		at UMass	L 50–87	3–26 (1–15)	Mullins Center (644); Amherst, MA
Atlantic 10 women's tournament
February 27, 2018; 7:00 p.m.	(14)	at (3) Fordham; First round	L 53–75	3–27	Rose Hill Gymnasium (662); The Bronx, NY
*Non-conference game. ^{#}Rankings from AP poll. (#) Tournament seedings in parentheses. All times are in Eastern.

== See also ==
- 2017–18 Rhode Island Rams men's basketball team
