= 2017–18 George Mason Patriots women's basketball team =

American college basketball season

2017–18 George Mason Patriots women's basketball

WNIT, Second Round
- Conference: Atlantic 10 Conference
- Record: 24–10 (11–5 A-10)
- Head coach: Nyla Milleson (5th season)
- Assistant coaches: Tajama Abraham Ngongba; Bob Dunn; Kaci Bailey
- Home arena: EagleBank Arena

2017–18 Atlantic 10 women's basketball standings
	Conf.				Overall
Team	W		L	PCT	W		L	PCT
Dayton	15	–	1	.938	23	–	7	.767
Duquesne	13	–	3	.813	25	–	8	.758
Fordham	12	–	4	.750	24	–	10	.706
George Mason	11	–	5	.688	24	–	10	.706
George Washington †	10	–	6	.625	19	–	14	.576
Saint Joseph's	10	–	6	.625	19	–	15	.559
Saint Louis	9	–	7	.563	17	–	16	.515
Richmond	8	–	8	.500	14	–	17	.452
Davidson	7	–	9	.438	12	–	18	.400
UMass	6	–	10	.375	14	–	16	.467
La Salle	3	–	13	.188	8	–	22	.267
St. Bonaventure	3	–	13	.188	8	–	22	.267
VCU	4	–	12	.250	7	–	22	.241
Rhode Island	1	–	15	.063	3	–	27	.100
† 2018 A10 Tournament winner As of 22 March 2018; Rankings from AP poll

The 2017–18 George Mason Patriots women's basketball team represented George Mason University during the 2017–18 NCAA Division I women's basketball season. The Patriots, led by fifth year head coach Nyla Milleson, played their home games at EagleBank Arena and were members of the Atlantic 10 Conference. They finished the season 24–10, 11–5 in A-10 play to finish in fourth place. They advanced to the quarterfinals of the A-10 women's tournament, where they lost to George Washington. They received an at-large bid to the Women's National Invitation Tournament, where they defeated Stephen F. Austin in the first round before losing to Virginia Tech in the second round.

== Media ==
=== George Mason Patriots Sports Network ===
Patriots games will be broadcast on WGMU Radio and streamed online through Patriot Vision. Most home games will also be featured on the A-10 Digital Network. Select games will be televised.

== Roster ==
2017–18 George Mason Patriots women's basketball team
Players
Coaches

Pos.	#	Name	Height	Year	Previous school	Hometown
G	3	Camden Musgrave (I) (redshirt)	5 ft 7 in (1.7 m)	RS Jr	Elizabeth Seton; Central Connecticut	Bowie, MD
G/F	4	DeJah Williford-Kelley	6 ft 1 in (1.85 m)	So	Lower Richland	Columbia, SC
G	5	Alexsis Grate	5 ft 6 in (1.68 m)	So	Bethel	Hampton, VA
G	10	Jewel Triggs	5 ft 11 in (1.8 m)	Jr	Thibodaux	Thibodaux, LA
G/F	11	Jacy Bolton	6 ft 0 in (1.83 m)	So	Drexel	Drexel, MO
G	12	Marika Korpinen	5 ft 9 in (1.75 m)	Fr	Long Island Lutheran	Turku, Finland
F	13	Taylor Byrne	6 ft 1 in (1.85 m)	RS So	Long Island Lutheran; Seton Hall	Massapequa, NY
G	14	Nicole Cardaño-Hillary	5 ft 7 in (1.7 m)	Fr	Vista Ridge	Madrid, Spain
F	21	Casey Davis	6 ft 2 in (1.88 m)	RS Jr	Elizabeth Seton	Gambrills, MD
F	31	Danielle Deoul	6 ft 2 in (1.88 m)	RS Fr	Immaculate Conception	Washingtonville, NY
G	32	Tayler Dodson	5 ft 11 in (1.8 m)	Sr	Spotswood	Harrisonburg, VA
F	33	Camarie Gatling	6 ft 0 in (1.83 m)	Fr	Highland Springs	Richmond, VA
F	35	Allie McCool	6 ft 2 in (1.88 m)	So	East Central	St. Leon, IN
G	44	Sarah Kaminski	5 ft 9 in (1.75 m)	So	Minnehaha	Plymouth, MN
C	51	Natalie Butler	6 ft 5 in (1.96 m)	RS Sr	Lake Baddock; Connecticut	Fairfax Station, VA

Head coach

- Nyla Milleson (Kansas State)

Assistant coach(es)

- Tajama Abraham Ngongba (George Washington)
- Bob Dunn (Dayton)
- Kaci Bailey (Southern Illinois)

Legend

- (C) Team captain
- (S) Suspended
- (I) Ineligible
- (W) Walk-on
- Injured
- Current redshirt

Roster

== Schedule ==
Date time, TV	Rank^{#}	Opponent^{#}	Result	Record	Site (attendance) city, state
Non-conference regular season
11/10/2017*; 7:00 pm		at No. 24 Michigan; Preseason WNIT First Round	L 61–75	0–1	Crisler Center (3,442); Ann Arbor, MI
11/14/2017*; 7:00 pm		at Loyola (MD)	W 80–72	1–1	Reitz Arena (212); Baltimore, MD
11/17/2017*; 2:30 pm		Old Dominion; Preseason WNIT consolation round	W 66–53	2–1	EagleBank Arena (523); Fairfax, VA
11/18/2017*; 2:30 pm		Southeast Missouri State; Preseason WNIT consolation round	W 57–38	3–1	EagleBank Arena (448); Fairfax, VA
11/20/2017*; 7:00 pm		American	W 71–53	4–1	EagleBank Arena (481); Fairfax, VA
11/22/2017*; 12:00 pm		Illinois State	W 56–37	5–1	EagleBank Arena (432); Fairfax, VA
11/24/2017*; 4:30 pm		vs. Drake; Rocky Mountain Hoops Classic semifinals	W 87–75	6–1	Coors Events Center (1,486); Boulder, CO
11/25/2017*; 4:30 pm		at Colorado; Rocky Mountain Hoops Classic championship	L 61–76	6–2	Coors Events Center (1,441); Boulder, CO
11/29/2017*; 7:00 pm		Maryland Eastern Shore	W 82–68	7–2	EagleBank Arena (549); Fairfax, VA
12/07/2017*; 7:00 pm		LIU Brooklyn	W 73–70 ^{OT}	8–2	EagleBank Arena (473); Fairfax, VA
12/09/2017*; 1:00 pm		Eastern Kentucky	W 64–41	9–2	EagleBank Arena (414); Fairfax, VA
12/11/2017*; 7:00 pm		UMBC	W 58–38	10–2	EagleBank Arena (527); Fairfax, VA
12/21/2017*; 8:00 pm		at Houston	L 73–82	10–3	H&PE Arena (467); Houston, TX
12/28/2017*; 7:00 pm		Longwood	W 60–41	11–3	EagleBank Arena (716); Fairfax, VA
Atlantic 10 regular season
12/31/2017; 2:00 pm		Davidson	W 74–61	12–3 (1–0)	EagleBank Arena (876); Fairfax, VA
01/03/2018; 7:00 pm		at La Salle	W 69–56	13–3 (2–0)	Tom Gola Arena (295); Philadelphia, PA
01/07/2018; 6:00 pm, CBSSN		at George Washington; Revolutionary Rivalry	L 52–62	13–4 (2–1)	Charles E. Smith Center (772); Washington, D.C.
01/14/2018; 6:00 pm		at Rhode Island	W 92–53	14–4 (3–1)	Ryan Center (378); Kingston, RI
01/17/2018; 11:00 am		Richmond	W 77–56	15–4 (4–1)	EagleBank Arena (503); Fairfax, VA
01/21/2018; 2:00 pm		at Duquesne	L 64–71	15–5 (4–2)	Palumbo Center (845); Pittsburgh, PA
01/24/2018; 7:00 pm		Saint Louis	W 81–72	16–5 (5–2)	EagleBank Arena (711); Fairfax, VA
01/28/2018; 2:00 pm		Fordham	L 62–67	17–5 (5–3)	EagleBank Arena (2,380); Fairfax, VA
01/31/2018; 7:00 pm		at St. Bonaventure	W 76–63	17–6 (6–3)	Reilly Center (928); Olean, NY
02/04/2018; 6:00 pm, CBSSN		at Saint Joseph's	W 65–57	18–6 (7–3)	Hagan Arena (343); Philadelphia, PA
02/07/2018; 7:00 pm		George Washington; Revolutionary Rivalry	L 61–65	18–7 (7–4)	EagleBank Arena (996); Fairfax, VA
02/11/2018; 2:00 pm		UMass	W 71–60	19–7 (8–4)	EagleBank Arena (1,567); Fairfax, VA
02/15/2018; 11:00 am		at VCU; Rivalry	W 65–42	20–7 (9–4)	Siegel Center (2,219); Richmond, VA
02/18/2018; 2:00 pm		St. Bonaventure	W 78–63	21–7 (10–4)	EagleBank Arena (1,544); Fairfax, VA
02/21/2018; 7:00 pm		at Dayton	L 66–71	21–8 (10–5)	UD Arena (2,099); Dayton, OH
02/24/2018; 2:00 pm		La Salle	W 65–55	22–8 (11–5)	EagleBank Arena (1,460); Fairfax, VA
Atlantic 10 Women's Tournament
02/27/2018; 7:00 pm	(4)	(13) St. Bonaventure; First Round	W 89–79	23–8	EagleBank Arena (1,115); Fairfax, VA
03/02/2018; 2:00 pm	(4)	vs. (5) George Washington; Quarterfinals	L 59–64	23–9	Richmond Coliseum; Richmond, VA
WNIT
03/16/2018*; 7:00 pm		Stephen F. Austin; First Round	W 82–75	24–9	EagleBank Arena (802); Fairfax, VA
03/18/2018*; 2:00 pm		at Virginia Tech; Second Round	L 69–78	24–10	Cassell Coliseum (774); Blacksburg, VA
*Non-conference game. ^{#}Rankings from AP Poll. (#) Tournament seedings in parentheses. All times are in Eastern Time.

== Rankings ==
2017–18 NCAA Division I women's basketball rankings

Regular season polls
Poll	Pre- Season	Week 2	Week 3	Week 4	Week 5	Week 6	Week 7	Week 8	Week 9	Week 10	Week 11	Week 12	Week 13	Week 14	Week 15	Week 16	Week 17	Week 18	Week 19	Final
AP																				N/A
Coaches																				

Legend
	Increase in ranking
	Decrease in ranking
	No change
(RV)	Received votes
(NR)	Not ranked

== See also ==
- 2017–18 George Mason Patriots men's basketball team
