= 2017–18 Duquesne Dukes women's basketball team =

U.S. Intercollegiate basketball season

2017–18 Duquesne Dukes women's basketball

WNIT, Third Round
- Conference: Atlantic 10 Conference
- Record: 25–8 (13–3 A-10)
- Head coach: Dan Burt (5th season)
- Assistant coaches: Matt Schmidt; Rachel Wojdowski; Cherie Lea
- Home arena: Palumbo Center

2017–18 Atlantic 10 women's basketball standings
	Conf.				Overall
Team	W		L	PCT	W		L	PCT
Dayton	15	–	1	.938	23	–	7	.767
Duquesne	13	–	3	.813	25	–	8	.758
Fordham	12	–	4	.750	24	–	10	.706
George Mason	11	–	5	.688	24	–	10	.706
George Washington †	10	–	6	.625	19	–	14	.576
Saint Joseph's	10	–	6	.625	19	–	15	.559
Saint Louis	9	–	7	.563	17	–	16	.515
Richmond	8	–	8	.500	14	–	17	.452
Davidson	7	–	9	.438	12	–	18	.400
UMass	6	–	10	.375	14	–	16	.467
La Salle	3	–	13	.188	8	–	22	.267
St. Bonaventure	3	–	13	.188	8	–	22	.267
VCU	4	–	12	.250	7	–	22	.241
Rhode Island	1	–	15	.063	3	–	27	.100
† 2018 A10 Tournament winner As of 22 March 2018; Rankings from AP poll

The 2017–18 Duquesne Dukes women's basketball team represented Duquesne University during the 2017–18 NCAA Division I women's basketball season. The Dukes were led by fifth year head coach Dan Burt. The Dukes were members of the Atlantic 10 Conference and play their home games at the Palumbo Center. They finished the season 25–5, 13–3 in A-10 play to finish in second place. They lost in the quarterfinals of the A-10 women's tournament to Saint Joseph's. They received an automatic trip to the Women's National Invitation Tournament, where they defeated Miami (OH) and Georgetown in the first and second rounds before losing to St. John's in the third round.

== 2017–18 media ==
=== Duquesne Dukes Sports Network ===
Alex Panormios and Tad Maurey provide the call for home games on A-10 Digital Network. Select games will be televised.

== Roster ==
2017–18 Duquesne Dukes women's basketball team
Players
Coaches

Pos.	#	Name	Height	Year	Previous school	Hometown
G	1	Nina Aho	5 ft 10 in (1.78 m)	So	Veres Palne Gimnazium	Budapest, Hungary
G	2	Chassidy Omogrosso	5 ft 6 in (1.68 m)	Jr	Blackhawk	Beaver Falls, PA
G/F	10	Paige Cannon	6 ft 1 in (1.85 m)	RS So	Johnstown-Monroe	Johnstown, OH
G	11	Halle Bovel	5 ft 11 in (1.8 m)	So	St. Mary's	Hamilton, ON
G	12	Anie-Pier Samson	6 ft 2 in (1.88 m)	So	Seminaire Ste-Trinite	Saint-Bruno-de-Montarville, QE
G	13	Juca Vojinovic	5 ft 10 in (1.78 m)	Jr	Sportska Gimnazija Beograd	Belgrade, Serbia
F	14	Eniko Kuttor	6 ft 1 in (1.85 m)	RS So	Dániel Berzsenyi Evangélikus	Budapest, Hungary
G	21	Libby Bazelak	5 ft 9 in (1.75 m)	Fr	Archbishop Alter	Kettering, OH
G	22	Conor Richardson	5 ft 10 in (1.78 m)	Jr	Carlynton	Pittsburgh, PA
F	23	Helmi Tulonen	6 ft 3 in (1.91 m)	Fr	Makelanrinteen lukio	Salo, Finland
G	24	Kiersten Elliott	5 ft 11 in (1.8 m)	RS Fr	Vincentian Academy	Glenshaw, PA
F	31	Laia Sole (redshirt)	6 ft 2 in (1.88 m)	So	Ine Joaquim Blume; Maine	Igualada, Spain
G	35	Amanda Kalin	5 ft 8 in (1.73 m)	Fr	Pine-Richland	Gibsonia, PA
G/F	42	Kadri-Ann Lass	6 ft 3 in (1.91 m)	Jr	Audentese Spordigumnaasium	Tallinn, Estonia
F	43	Judith Sole	6 ft 3 in (1.91 m)	RS Sr	IES Joaquim Blume; Robert Morris	Igualada, Spain
F	54	Angela Staffileno	6 ft 2 in (1.88 m)	Jr	Brooke	Wellsburg, WV

Head coach

- Dan Burt (West Liberty State)

Assistant coach(es)

- Matt Schmidt (West Liberty State)
- Rachel Wojdowski (NYU)
- Cherie Lea (UNC Wilmington)

Legend

- (C) Team captain
- (S) Suspended
- (I) Ineligible
- (W) Walk-on
- Injured
- Current redshirt

Roster
Last update: September 8, 2017

== Schedule ==
Date time, TV	Rank^{#}	Opponent^{#}	Result	Record	Site (attendance) city, state
Non-conference regular season
11/10/2017*; 7:00 pm		at Charlotte	L 72–75	0–1	Dale F. Halton Arena (4,841); Charlotte, NC
11/12/2017*; 2:00 pm		at Winthrop	W 81–54	1–1	Winthrop Coliseum (303); Rock Hill, SC
11/16/2017*; 7:00 pm, ACCN Extra		at Pittsburgh; City Game	W 66–53	2–1	Petersen Events Center (1,410); Pittsburgh, PA
11/19/2017*; 1:00 pm, ESPN3		at East Tennessee State	L 77–81	2–2	J. Madison Brooks Gymnasium (532); Johnson City, TN
11/21/2017*; 6:00 pm		Iona	W 80–59	3–2	Palumbo Center (458); Pittsburgh, PA
11/25/2017*; 4:30 pm		vs. North Carolina A&T; Virginia Thanksgiving Tournament	W 73–60	4–2	John Paul Jones Arena (2,883); Charlottesville, VA
11/26/2017*; 3:30 pm, ACCN Extra		at Virginia; Virginia Thanksgiving Tournament	W 74–63	5–2	John Paul Jones Arena (2,846); Charlottesville, VA
11/30/2017*; 7:00 pm		Saint Francis (PA)	W 87–68	6–2	Palumbo Center (631); Pittsburgh, PA
12/02/2017*; 2:00 pm		Central Connecticut	W 83–58	7–2	Palumbo Center (756); Pittsburgh, PA
12/06/2017*; 5:30 pm		Toledo	W 73–54	8–2	Palumbo Center (620); Pittsburgh, PA
12/07/2017*; 3:00 pm		Akron	W 66–60	9–2	Palumbo Center (1,213); Pittsburgh, PA
12/17/2017*; 2:30 pm		Central Michigan	W 64–61	10–2	Palumbo Center (721); Pittsburgh, PA
12/22/2017*; 7:00 pm, SNY/ESPN3		vs. No. 1 Connecticut	L 52–104	10–3	Mattamy Athletic Centre (3,000); Toronto, ON
Atlantic 10 regular season
12/31/2017; 1:00 pm		UMass	W 60–57	11–3 (1–0)	Palumbo Center (841); Pittsburgh, PA
01/04/2018; 7:00 pm		at Davidson	W 79–54	12–3 (2–0)	John M. Belk Arena (387); Davidson, NC
01/07/2018; 1:00 pm		at VCU	W 70–51	13–3 (3–0)	Siegel Center (540); Richmond, VA
01/13/2018; 12:00 pm, CBSSN		at George Washington	W 54–53	14–3 (4–0)	Charles E. Smith Center (854); Washington, D.C.
01/17/2018; 7:00 pm		La Salle	W 78–50	15–3 (5–0)	Palumbo Center (670); Pittsburgh, PA
01/21/2018; 2:00 pm		George Mason	W 71–64	16–3 (6–0)	Palumbo Center (845); Pittsburgh, PA
01/24/2018; 2:00 pm		at Saint Joseph's	W 61–42	17–3 (7–0)	Hagan Arena (543); Philadelphia, PA
01/28/2018; 4:00 pm, NBCSN		St. Bonaventure	W 73–59	18–3 (8–0)	Palumbo Center (1,421); Pittsburgh, PA
01/31/2018; 7:00 pm		at Dayton	L 70–79	18–4 (8–1)	UD Arena (3,223); Dayton, OH
02/04/2018; 12:00 pm		at Richmond	W 78–70	19–4 (9–1)	Robins Center (746); Richmond, VA
02/07/2018; 7:00 pm		VCU	W 80–71	20–4 (10–1)	Palumbo Center (583); Pittsburgh, PA
02/10/2018; 2:30 pm		Saint Joseph's	L 50–69	20–5 (10–2)	Palumbo Center (711); Pittsburgh, PA
02/14/2018; 8:00 pm		at Saint Louis	W 76–66	21–5 (11–2)	Chaifetz Arena (402); St. Louis, MO
02/17/2018; 2:00 pm		Rhode Island	W 80–71	22–5 (12–2)	Palumbo Center (948); Pittsburgh, PA
02/21/2018; 7:00 pm		Fordham	L 43–51	22–6 (12–3)	Palumbo Center (707); Pittsburgh, PA
02/24/2018; 2:00 pm		at St. Bonaventure	W 76–73	23–6 (13–3)	Reilly Center (921); Olean, NY
Atlantic 10 Tournament
03/02/2018; 4:30 pm	(2)	vs. (7) Saint Joseph's; Quarterfinals	L 65–71	23–7	Richmond Coliseum; Richmond, VA
WNIT
03/15/2018*; 7:00 pm, ESPN3		at Miami (OH); First Round	W 69–56	24–7	Millett Hall (510); Oxford, OH
03/19/2018*; 7:00 pm		at Georgetown; Second Round	W 69–66	25–7	McDonough Gymnasium (285); Washington, D.C.
03/22/2018*; 7:00 pm		at St. John's; Third Round	L 52–65	25–8	Carnesecca Arena (335); Queens, NY
*Non-conference game. ^{#}Rankings from AP Poll. (#) Tournament seedings in parentheses. All times are in Eastern Time.

== Rankings ==
2017–18 NCAA Division I women's basketball rankings

Regular season polls
Poll	Pre- Season	Week 2	Week 3	Week 4	Week 5	Week 6	Week 7	Week 8	Week 9	Week 10	Week 11	Week 12	Week 13	Week 14	Week 15	Week 16	Week 17	Week 18	Week 19	Final
AP	NR	NR	NR	NR	NR	NR	NR	NR	NR	NR	NR	NR	RV	NR	NR	NR	NR	NR	NR	N/A
Coaches	NR	N/A	NR	NR	NR	NR	NR	NR	NR	NR	NR	NR	NR	NR	NR	NR	NR	NR	NR	

Legend
	Increase in ranking
	Decrease in ranking
	No change
(RV)	Received votes
(NR)	Not ranked

== See also ==
- 2017–18 Duquesne Dukes men's basketball team
