= 2017–18 George Washington Colonials women's basketball team =

Intercollegiate basketball season

2017–18 George Washington Colonials women's basketball

Atlantic 10 Tournament Champions

NCAA Women's Tournament, first round
- Conference: Atlantic 10 Conference
- Record: 19–14 (10–6 A-10)
- Head coach: Jennifer Rizzotti (2nd season)
- Assistant coaches: Ganiyat Adeduntan; Jackie Smith; Kevin DeMille
- Home arena: Charles E. Smith Center

2017–18 Atlantic 10 women's basketball standings
	Conf.				Overall
Team	W		L	PCT	W		L	PCT
Dayton	15	–	1	.938	23	–	7	.767
Duquesne	13	–	3	.813	25	–	8	.758
Fordham	12	–	4	.750	24	–	10	.706
George Mason	11	–	5	.688	24	–	10	.706
George Washington †	10	–	6	.625	19	–	14	.576
Saint Joseph's	10	–	6	.625	19	–	15	.559
Saint Louis	9	–	7	.563	17	–	16	.515
Richmond	8	–	8	.500	14	–	17	.452
Davidson	7	–	9	.438	12	–	18	.400
UMass	6	–	10	.375	14	–	16	.467
La Salle	3	–	13	.188	8	–	22	.267
St. Bonaventure	3	–	13	.188	8	–	22	.267
VCU	4	–	12	.250	7	–	22	.241
Rhode Island	1	–	15	.063	3	–	27	.100
† 2018 A10 Tournament winner As of 22 March 2018; Rankings from AP poll

The 2017–18 George Washington Colonials women's basketball team represented George Washington University during the 2017–18 NCAA Division I women's basketball season. The Colonials, led by second year head coach Jennifer Rizzotti, played their home games at Charles E. Smith Center and were members of the Atlantic 10 Conference. They finished the season 19–14, 10–6 in A-10 play to finish in a tie for fifth place. They won the A-10 tournament by defeating Saint Joseph's and received an automatic bid to the NCAA women's tournament where they lost to Ohio State in the first round.

== Media ==
WRGW will carry the Colonials games and broadcast them online at GWRadio.com. The A-10 Digital Network will carry all non-televised Colonials home games and most conference road games through RaiseHigh Live.

== Roster ==
2017–18 George Washington Colonials women's basketball team
Players
Coaches

Pos.	#	Name	Height	Year	Previous school	Hometown
F	1	Kelsi Mahoney	6 ft 1 in (1.85 m)	Jr	Jay M. Robinson	Concord, NC
G	2	Camila Tapias	5 ft 6 in (1.68 m)	Sr	IMG Academy	Bogotá, Colombia
F	3	Chyna Latimer	6 ft 0 in (1.83 m)	Fr	Patterson Mill	Bel Air, MD
G	4	Lexus Levy	5 ft 6 in (1.68 m)	Fr	Seton Catholic Central	Binghamton, NY
G	5	Brianna Cummings	5 ft 10 in (1.78 m)	Sr	Greater Atlanta Christian	Lawrenceville, GA
F	11	Olivia Gumbs (redshirt)	6 ft 1 in (1.85 m)	So	St. Andrew's School; Lafayette	Newark, DE
F	20	Sarah Overcash (redshirt)	6 ft 1 in (1.85 m)	So	St. John's College; Illinois	Chevy Chase, MD
G	21	Mei-Lyn Bautista	5 ft 6 in (1.68 m)	Jr	St. Mary's	Whitestone, NY
G	23	Taylor Campbell	5 ft 9 in (1.75 m)	Sr	Marquette; Lehigh	Chesterfield, MO
C	25	Kelli Prange	6 ft 5 in (1.96 m)	Sr	Damascus	Damascus, MD
F	30	Neila Luma	6 ft 0 in (1.83 m)	Fr	Bethlehem Catholic	Macungie, PA
G	33	Kendall Bresee	5 ft 11 in (1.8 m)	So	Urbana	Frederick, MD

Head coach

- Jennifer Rizzotti (Connecticut)

Assistant coach(es)

- Ganiyat Adeduntan (Florida State)
- Jackie Smith (Hartford)
- Kevin DeMille (Connecticut)

Legend

- (C) Team captain
- (S) Suspended
- (I) Ineligible
- (W) Walk-on
- Injured
- Current redshirt

Roster

== Schedule ==
Date time, TV	Rank^{#}	Opponent^{#}	Result	Record	Site (attendance) city, state
Non-conference regular season
11/10/2017*; 6:30 pm		at Princeton	L 52–72	0–1	Jadwin Gymnasium (803); Princeton, NJ
11/12/2017*; 2:00 pm		South Dakota State	L 88–97 ^{OT}	0–2	Charles E. Smith Center (1,135); Washington, D.C.
11/16/2017*; 7:00 pm		at Towson	W 66–43	1–2	SECU Arena (1,213); Towson, MD
11/19/2017*; 2:00 pm		Georgetown	W 65–54	2–2	Charles E. Smith Center (1,005); Washington, D.C.
11/23/2017*; 1:30 pm		vs. Vanderbilt; Paradise Jam Tournament Reef Division	L 59–69	2–3	Charles E. Smith Center (707); Washington, D.C.
11/24/2017*; 1:00 pm		vs. Wisconsin; Paradise Jam Tournament Reef Division	W 61–46	3–3	Charles E. Smith Center; Washington, D.C.
11/25/2017*; 3:30 pm		vs. Syracuse; Paradise Jam Tournament Reef Division	L 62–72	3–4	Charles E. Smith Center (788); Washington, D.C.
12/02/2017*; 2:00 pm		No. 17 South Florida	L 78–83	3–5	Charles E. Smith Center (1,125); Washington, D.C.
12/06/2017*; 7:00 pm, ESPN3		at Mercer	L 44–61	3–6	Hawkins Arena (852); Macon, GA
12/08/2017*; 7:00 pm		at No. 15 Maryland	L 54–80	3–7	Xfinity Center (4,125); College Park, MD
12/17/2017*; 2:00 pm		American	W 61–44	4–7	Charles E. Smith Center (653); Washington, D.C.
12/22/2017*; 2:00 pm, ESPN3		at Monmouth	W 59–45	5–7	OceanFirst Bank Center (305); West Long Branch, NJ
Atlantic 10 regular season
12/31/2017; 2:00 pm		at Fordham	L 50–61	5–8 (0–1)	Rose Hill Gymnasium (905); Bronx, NY
01/03/2018; 6:00 pm		at VCU	W 61–39	6–8 (1–1)	Siegel Center (702); Richmond, VA
01/07/2018; 6:00 pm, CBSSN		George Mason; Revolutionary Rivalry	W 62–52	7–8 (2–1)	Charles E. Smith Center (772); Washington, D.C.
01/13/2018; 12:00 pm, CBSSN		Duquesne	L 53–54	7–9 (2–2)	Charles E. Smith Center (854); Washington, D.C.
01/17/2018; 7:00 pm		at Davidson	W 53–48	8–9 (3–2)	John M. Belk Arena (243); Davidson, NC
01/21/2018; 12:00 pm, CBSSN		at Dayton	L 55–66	8–10 (3–3)	UD Arena (2,112); Dayton, OH
01/24/2018; 11:00 am		Rhode Island	W 65–52	9–10 (4–3)	Charles E. Smith Center (1,100); Washington, D.C.
01/27/2018; 12:00 pm		Saint Louis	L 69–72 ^{OT}	9–11 (4–4)	Charles E. Smith Center (757); Washington, D.C.
02/01/2018; 7:00 pm		La Salle	W 60–45	10–11 (5–4)	Charles E. Smith Center (833); Washington, D.C.
02/04/2018; 1:00 pm		at St. Bonaventure	W 63–56	11–11 (6–4)	Reilly Center (1,009); Olean, NY
02/07/2018; 7:00 pm		at George Mason; Revolutionary Rivalry	W 65–61	11–12 (7–4)	EagleBank Arena (996); Fairfax, VA
02/11/2018; 12:00 pm, ESPNU		Dayton	L 53–57	12–12 (7–5)	Charles E. Smith Center (916); Washington, D.C.
02/14/2018; 7:00 pm		UMass	W 55–49	13–12 (8–5)	Charles E. Smith Center (592); Washington, D.C.
02/17/2018; 3:00 pm		at Saint Louis	W 71–58	14–12 (9–5)	Chaifetz Arena (764); St. Louis, MO
02/20/2018; 7:00 pm		at Saint Joseph's	W 49–46	15–12 (10–5)	Hagan Arena (551); Philadelphia, PA
02/24/2018; 2:00 pm		Richmond	L 36–49	15–13 (10–6)	Charles E. Smith Center (524); Washington, D.C.
Atlantic 10 Women's Tournament
02/27/2018; 7:00 pm	(5)	(12) La Salle; First Round	W 69–49	16–13	Charles E. Smith Center (472); Washington, D.C.
03/02/2018; 2:00 pm	(5)	vs. (4) George Mason; Quarterfinals	W 64–59	17–13	Richmond Coliseum; Richmond, VA
03/03/2018; 11:00 am, CBSSN	(5)	vs. (1) Dayton; Semifinals	W 58–53	18–13	Richmond Coliseum; Richmond, VA
03/04/2018; 1:00 pm, ESPNU	(5)	vs. (6) Saint Joseph's; Championship Game	W 65–49	19–13	Richmond Coliseum (2,103); Richmond, VA
NCAA Women's Tournament
03/17/2018*; 1:30 pm, ESPN2	(14 A)	at (3 A) No. 10 Ohio State; First Round	L 45–87	19–14	St. John Arena (4,253); Columbus, OH
*Non-conference game. ^{#}Rankings from AP Poll. (#) Tournament seedings in parentheses. A=Albany Region. All times are in Eastern Time.

== Rankings ==
2017–18 NCAA Division I women's basketball rankings

Regular season polls
Poll	Pre- Season	Week 2	Week 3	Week 4	Week 5	Week 6	Week 7	Week 8	Week 9	Week 10	Week 11	Week 12	Week 13	Week 14	Week 15	Week 16	Week 17	Week 18	Week 19	Final
AP																				N/A
Coaches																				

Legend
	Increase in ranking
	Decrease in ranking
	No change
(RV)	Received votes
(NR)	Not ranked

== See also ==
- 2017–18 George Washington Colonials men's basketball team
