= 2017–18 UMass Minutewomen basketball team =

Intercollegiate basketball season

2017–18 UMass Minutewomen basketball
- Conference: Atlantic 10 Conference
- Record: 14–16 (6–10 A-10)
- Head coach: Tory Verdi (2nd season)
- Assistant coaches: Danny Hughes; Candice Finley; Candice Walker
- Home arena: William D. Mullins Memorial Center

2017–18 Atlantic 10 women's basketball standings
	Conf.				Overall
Team	W		L	PCT	W		L	PCT
Dayton	15	–	1	.938	23	–	7	.767
Duquesne	13	–	3	.813	25	–	8	.758
Fordham	12	–	4	.750	24	–	10	.706
George Mason	11	–	5	.688	24	–	10	.706
George Washington †	10	–	6	.625	19	–	14	.576
Saint Joseph's	10	–	6	.625	19	–	15	.559
Saint Louis	9	–	7	.563	17	–	16	.515
Richmond	8	–	8	.500	14	–	17	.452
Davidson	7	–	9	.438	12	–	18	.400
UMass	6	–	10	.375	14	–	16	.467
La Salle	3	–	13	.188	8	–	22	.267
St. Bonaventure	3	–	13	.188	8	–	22	.267
VCU	4	–	12	.250	7	–	22	.241
Rhode Island	1	–	15	.063	3	–	27	.100
† 2018 A10 Tournament winner As of 22 March 2018; Rankings from AP poll

The 2017–18 UMass Minutewomen basketball team represented the University of Massachusetts Amherst during the 2017–18 college basketball season. The Minutewomen, led by second year head coach Tory Verdi, were members of the Atlantic 10 Conference and played their home games at the William D. Mullins Memorial Center. They finished the season 14–16, 6–10 in A-10 play to finish in tenth place. They lost in the first round of the A-10 women's tournament to Saint Louis.

== Media ==
All non-televised Minutewomen home games and conference road games stream on the A-10 Digital Network. WMUA carries Minutewomen games with Mike Knittle on the call.

== Roster ==
2017–18 UMass Minutewomen women's basketball team
Players
Coaches

Pos.	#	Name	Height	Year	Previous school	Hometown
F/C	00	Maggie Mulligan	6 ft 2 in (1.88 m)	Sr	Boston Latin School	Boston, MA
G/F	2	Genesis Rivera	5 ft 11 in (1.8 m)	Jr	Gustavo; Panola College	Caracas, Venezuela
F	10	Alexia Allesch	6 ft 1 in (1.85 m)	Fr	Gill St. Bernard's	Basking Ridge, NJ
G	11	Bre Hampton-Bey	5 ft 6 in (1.68 m)	Fr	Notre Dame Academy	Toledo, OH
C	14	Anil Soysal	6 ft 5 in (1.96 m)	Fr	Anatolian	Istanbul, Turkey
G	15	Paige McCormick	5 ft 11 in (1.8 m)	Fr	Heuvelton Central	Ogdensburg, NY
G	21	Autumn Giles	5 ft 9 in (1.75 m)	Fr	Fort Myers	Fort Myers, FL
G	22	Jessica George	5 ft 10 in (1.78 m)	Jr	North Point	Waldorf, MD
G	23	Vashnie Perry	5 ft 6 in (1.68 m)	So	Norcross HS; Florida Atlantic	Nashville, TN
G/F	24	Hailey Leidel	5 ft 11 in (1.8 m)	So	Woodhaven	Brownstown, MI
G	25	Leah McDerment	5 ft 10 in (1.78 m)	Sr	Priestnall School	Stockport, England

Head coach

- Tory Verdi (Keene State)

Assistant coach(es)

- Danny Hughes (TCU)
- Candice Finley (Eastern Kentucky)
- Candice Walker (Loyola (MD))

Legend

- (C) Team captain
- (S) Suspended
- (I) Ineligible
- (W) Walk-on
- Injured
- Current redshirt

Roster

== Schedule ==
Date time, TV	Rank^{#}	Opponent^{#}	Result	Record	Site (attendance) city, state
Exhibition
11/03/2017*; 4:30 pm		Kutztown	W 79–66		Mullins Center; Amherst, MA
11/06/2017*; 7:00 pm		Flagler	W 75–51		Mullins Center; Amherst, MA
Non-conference regular season
11/10/2017*; 4:30 pm		Maine–Fort Kent	W 111–45	1–0	Mullins Center (628); Amherst, MA
11/12/2017*; 2:00 pm		Towson	W 72–49	2–0	Mullins Center (361); Amherst, MA
11/17/2017*; 8:00 pm, ESPN3		at North Dakota State	L 70–82	2–1	Scheels Center (605); Grand Forks, ND
11/19/2017*; 3:00 pm, FSNOR/FSCP		at North Dakota	L 52–82	2–2	Betty Engelstad Sioux Center (1,580); Grand Forks, ND
11/24/2017*; 1:00 pm		Northeastern; UMass Thanksgiving Classic	L 54–64	2–3	Mullins Center (387); Amherst, MA
11/25/2017*; 1:00 pm		Liberty; UMass Thanksgiving Classic	W 64–61	3–3	Mullins Center (396); Amherst, MA
11/29/2017*; 1:00 pm		at Incarnate Word	W 64–45	4–3	McDermott Convocation Center (521); San Antonio, TX
12/01/2017*; 8:00 pm		at Texas–Rio Grande Valley; UTRGV Battle on the Border	L 59–67	4–4	UTRGV Fieldhouse (273); Edinburg, TX
12/02/2017*; 1:00 pm		vs. Mississippi Valley State; UTRGV Battle on the Border	W 85–46	5–4	UTRGV Fieldhouse; Edinburg, TX
12/07/2017*; 7:00 pm		Fisher College	W 121–38	6–4	Mullins Center (421); Amherst, MA
12/10/2017*; 2:00 pm		Saint Peter's	W 81–65	7–4	Mullins Center (500); Amherst, MA
12/13/2017*; 7:30 pm, ESPN3		at UMass Lowell	W 73–63	8–4	Costello Athletic Center (1,475); Lowell, MA
12/21/2017*; 12:00 pm		Marist	L 60–88	8–5	Mullins Center (322); Amherst, MA
A-10 Regular season
12/31/2017; 1:00 pm		at Duquesne	L 57–60	8–6 (0–1)	Palumbo Center (841); Pittsburgh, PA
01/03/2018; 5:00 pm		Fordham	L 51–62	8–7 (0–2)	Mullins Center (364); Amherst, MA
01/06/2018; 11:00 am, CBSSN		at St. Bonaventure	L 59–69	8–8 (0–3)	Reilly Center (934); Olean, NY
01/13/2018; 2:00 pm		Saint Joseph's	L 79–84	8–9 (0–4)	Mullins Center (536); Amherst, MA
01/18/2018; 8:00 pm		at Saint Louis	L 63–64	8–10 (0–5)	Chaifetz Arena (486); St. Louis, MO
01/21/2018; 2:00 pm		VCU	W 79–75	9–10 (1–5)	Mullins Center (564); Amherst, MA
01/24/2018; 7:00 pm		at Davidson	L 81–87 ^{2OT}	9–11 (1–6)	John M. Belk Arena (941); Davidson, NC
01/28/2018; 2:00 pm		at Rhode Island	W 61–59	10–11 (2–6)	Ryan Center (454); Kingston, RI
01/31/2018; 11:30 am		Richmond	L 39–51	10–12 (2–7)	Mullins Center (2,512); Amherst, MA
02/04/2018; 12:00 pm		La Salle	W 69–66	11–12 (3–7)	Mullins Center (570); Amherst, MA
02/07/2018; 7:00 pm		Dayton	L 49–78	11–13 (3–8)	Mullins Center (312); Amherst, MA
02/11/2018; 2:00 pm		at George Mason	L 60–71	11–14 (3–9)	EagleBank Arena (1,567); Fairfax, VA
02/14/2018; 7:00 pm		at George Washington	L 49–55	11–15 (3–10)	Charles E. Smith Center (592); Washington, D.C.
02/17/2018; 2:00 pm		Davidson	W 70–68	12–15 (4–10)	Mullins Center (731); Amherst, MA
02/21/2018; 7:00 pm		at Richmond	W 58–49	13–15 (5–10)	Robins Center (418); Richmond, VA
02/24/2018; 12:00 pm		Rhode Island	W 87–50	14–15 (6–10)	Mullins Center (473); Amherst, MA
Atlantic 10 Women's Tournament
02/27/2018; 8:00 pm	(10)	at (7) Saint Louis; First Round	L 64–70	14–16	Chaifetz Arena (543); St. Louis, MO
*Non-conference game. ^{#}Rankings from AP Poll. (#) Tournament seedings in parentheses. All times are in Eastern Time.

== Rankings ==
2017–18 NCAA Division I women's basketball rankings

Regular season polls
Poll	Pre- Season	Week 2	Week 3	Week 4	Week 5	Week 6	Week 7	Week 8	Week 9	Week 10	Week 11	Week 12	Week 13	Week 14	Week 15	Week 16	Week 17	Week 18	Week 19	Final
AP																				N/A
Coaches																				

Legend
	Increase in ranking
	Decrease in ranking
	No change
(RV)	Received votes
(NR)	Not ranked

== See also ==
- 2017–18 UMass Minutemen basketball team
