= 2017–18 Richmond Spiders women's basketball team =

Intercollegiate basketball season

2017–18 Richmond Spiders women's basketball
- Conference: Atlantic 10 Conference
- Record: 14–17 (8–8 A-10)
- Head coach: Michael Shafer (13th season)
- Assistant coaches: John Miller; Kara Powell; Martina Wood
- Home arena: Robins Center

2017–18 Atlantic 10 women's basketball standings
	Conf.				Overall
Team	W		L	PCT	W		L	PCT
Dayton	15	–	1	.938	23	–	7	.767
Duquesne	13	–	3	.813	25	–	8	.758
Fordham	12	–	4	.750	24	–	10	.706
George Mason	11	–	5	.688	24	–	10	.706
George Washington †	10	–	6	.625	19	–	14	.576
Saint Joseph's	10	–	6	.625	19	–	15	.559
Saint Louis	9	–	7	.563	17	–	16	.515
Richmond	8	–	8	.500	14	–	17	.452
Davidson	7	–	9	.438	12	–	18	.400
UMass	6	–	10	.375	14	–	16	.467
La Salle	3	–	13	.188	8	–	22	.267
St. Bonaventure	3	–	13	.188	8	–	22	.267
VCU	4	–	12	.250	7	–	22	.241
Rhode Island	1	–	15	.063	3	–	27	.100
† 2018 A10 Tournament winner As of 22 March 2018; Rankings from AP poll

The 2017–18 Richmond Spiders women's basketball team represented the University of Richmond during the 2017–18 NCAA Division I women's basketball season. The Spiders, led by thirteenth year head coach Michael Shafer, played their home games at the Robins Center and were members of the Atlantic 10 Conference. They finished the season 14–17, 8–8 in A-10 play to finish in eighth place. They advanced to the quarterfinals of the A-10 women's tournament, where they lost to Dayton.

== 2017–18 media ==
All Spiders games are broadcast on WTVR 6.3 with Robert Fish on the call. The games are also streamed on Spider TV.

== Roster ==
2017–18 Richmond Spiders women's basketball team
Players
Coaches

Pos.	#	Name	Height	Year	Previous school	Hometown
G	0	Kylie Murphree	5 ft 9 in (1.75 m)	Sr	Fairfax	Fairfax, VA
F	1	Jaide Hinds-Clarke	6 ft 1 in (1.85 m)	So	Westwood	Westwood, NJ
G	3	Dee Hatcher	5 ft 8 in (1.73 m)	So	Lake Nona	Orlando, FL
F	5	Ragan Wiseman	6 ft 1 in (1.85 m)	So	Floyd County	Floyd, VA
G	11	Micaela Parson	5 ft 8 in (1.73 m)	Sr	Monacan	North Chesterfield, VA
G	13	Alex Parson	5 ft 6 in (1.68 m)	Fr	Monacan	North Chesterfield, VA
F	14	Alicia Hudalla	6 ft 1 in (1.85 m)	Sr	Glen Allen	Glen Allen, VA
F/C	15	Karleigh Wike	6 ft 4 in (1.93 m)	Sr	East Rowan	Salisbury, NC
F	22	Autumn Truesdale	6 ft 0 in (1.83 m)	Fr	The Berkshire School	New York, NY
G	23	Tonysha Curry	5 ft 10 in (1.78 m)	Fr	Manual	Louisville, KY
F	30	Kailyn Fee	5 ft 6 in (1.68 m)	Fr	Oakton	Vienna, VA
F	33	Amy Duggan	6 ft 0 in (1.83 m)	So	Noble and Greenough	Norwood, MA

Head coach

- Michael Shafer (William & Mary)

Assistant coach(es)

- John Miller (Mount St. Mary's)
- Kara Powell (Richmond)
- Martina Wood (North Carolina)

Legend

- (C) Team captain
- (S) Suspended
- (I) Ineligible
- (W) Walk-on
- Injured
- Current redshirt

Roster
Last update: February 15, 2018

== Schedule ==
Date time, TV	Rank^{#}	Opponent^{#}	Result	Record	Site (attendance) city, state
Non-conference regular season
Nov 10, 2017*; 7:00 pm		at Fairfield	W 72–67	1–0	Webster Bank Arena (788); Bridgeport, Connecticut
Nov 12, 2017*; 2:00 pm		at Columbia	W 85–79	2–0	Levien Gymnasium (418); New York, New York
Nov 15, 2017*; 7:00 pm		Wake Forest	L 81–85	2–1	Robins Center (775); Richmond, Virginia
Nov 18, 2017*; 7:00 pm		at East Carolina	W 65–64	3–1	Williams Arena (1,031); Greenville, North Carolina
Nov 21, 2017*; 4:30 pm		vs. Florida; Savannah Invitational	L 80–87	3–2	Savannah Civic Center; Savannah, Georgia
Nov 22, 2017*; 2:00 pm		vs. Savannah State; Savannah Invitational	W 100–63	4–2	Savannah Civic Center; Savannah, Georgia
Nov 23, 2017*; 2:00 pm		vs. Wright State; Savannah Invitational	L 69–85	4–3	Savannah Civic Center; Savannah, Georgia
Nov 26, 2017*; 2:00 pm, ESPN3		at Old Dominion	W 54–45	5–3	Ted Constant Convocation Center (1,561); Norfolk, Virginia
Nov 29, 2017*; 3:00 pm		William & Mary	L 64–78	5–4	Robins Center (353); Richmond, Virginia
Dec 1, 2017*; 7:00 pm		Quinnipiac	L 65–81	5–5	Robins Center (423); Richmond, Virginia
Dec 6, 2017*; 7:00 pm		Navy	L 56–76	5–6	Robins Center (407); Richmond, Virginia
Dec 20, 2017*; 1:00 pm, ESPN3		at Stetson; Hatter Classic	L 67–72	5–7	Edmunds Center (353); DeLand, Florida
Dec 21, 2017*; 3:00 pm		vs. Bethune–Cookman; Hatter Classic	L 50–63	5–8	Edmunds Center (279); DeLand, Florida
Atlantic 10 regular season
Dec 31, 2017; 2:00 pm		at Rhode Island	W 74–53	6–8 (1–0)	Ryan Center (354); Kingston, Rhode Island
Jan 3, 2018; 7:00 pm		Saint Louis	L 61–79	6–9 (1–1)	Robins Center (505); Richmond, Virginia
Jan 6, 2018; 6:00 pm		La Salle	W 79–51	7–9 (2–1)	Robins Center (1,075); Richmond, Virginia
Jan 10, 2018; 12:00 pm, NBCSN		at Saint Joseph's	L 72–81	7–10 (2–2)	Hagan Arena (681); Philadelphia, Pennsylvania
Jan 14, 2018; 2:00 pm		Davidson	L 65–68	7–11 (2–3)	Robins Center (654); Richmond, Virginia
Jan 17, 2018; 11:00 am		at George Mason	L 56–77	7–12 (2–4)	EagleBank Arena (503); Fairfax, Virginia
Jan 21, 2018; 2:00 pm		Fordham	L 38–43	7–13 (2–5)	Robins Center (854); Richmond, Virginia
Jan 24, 2018; 7:00 pm		Dayton	L 59–60	7–14 (2–6)	Robins Center (674); Richmond, Virginia
Jan 28, 2018; 7:00 pm, CBS 6.2		at VCU; Sonabank/P.O.W.E.R. Crosstown Showdown	W 77–68 ^{OT}	8–14 (3–6)	Siegel Center (1,856); Richmond, Virginia
Jan 31, 2018; 11:30 am		at UMass	W 51–39	9–14 (4–6)	Mullins Center (2,512); Amherst, Massachusetts
Feb 4, 2018; 12:00 pm		Duquesne	L 70–78	9–15 (4–7)	Robins Center (746); Richmond, Virginia
Feb 10, 2018; 6:00 pm		at La Salle	W 60–57	10–15 (5–7)	Tom Gola Arena (446); Philadelphia, Pennsylvania
Feb 14, 2018; 7:00 pm		at St. Bonaventure	W 79–57	11–15 (6–7)	Reilly Center (793); Olean, New York
Feb 18, 2018; 3:00 pm, CBS 6.3		VCU; Sonabank/P.O.W.E.R. Crosstown Showdown	W 59–54	12–15 (7–7)	Robins Center (1,302); Richmond, Virginia
Feb 21, 2018; 7:00 pm		UMass	L 49–58	12–16 (7–8)	Robins Center (418); Richmond, Virginia
Feb 24, 2018; 2:00 pm		at George Washington	W 49–36	13–16 (8–8)	Charles E. Smith Center (524); Washington, D.C.
Atlantic 10 Tournament
02/27/2018; 7:00 pm	(8)	(9) Davidson; First Round	W 62–53	14–16	Robins Center (451); Richmond, Virginia
03/02/2018; 11:00 am	(8)	vs. (1) Dayton; Quarterfinals	L 58–67	14–17	Richmond Coliseum; Richmond, Virginia
*Non-conference game. ^{#}Rankings from AP Poll. (#) Tournament seedings in parentheses. All times are in Eastern Time.

== Rankings ==
2017–18 NCAA Division I women's basketball rankings

Regular season polls
Poll	Pre- Season	Week 2	Week 3	Week 4	Week 5	Week 6	Week 7	Week 8	Week 9	Week 10	Week 11	Week 12	Week 13	Week 14	Week 15	Week 16	Week 17	Week 18	Week 19	Final
AP																				N/A
Coaches																				

Legend
	Increase in ranking
	Decrease in ranking
	No change
(RV)	Received votes
(NR)	Not ranked

== See also ==
- 2017–18 Richmond Spiders men's basketball team
