= 2017–18 Dayton Flyers women's basketball team =

Intercollegiate basketball season

2017–18 Dayton Flyers women's basketball

Atlantic 10 Regular Season Champions

NCAA Women's Tournament, first round
- Conference: Atlantic 10 Conference
- Record: 23–7 (15–1 A-10)
- Head coach: Shauna Green (2nd season)
- Assistant coaches: Simon Harris; Calamity McEntire; Ryan Gensler
- Home arena: UD Arena

2017–18 Atlantic 10 women's basketball standings
	Conf.				Overall
Team	W		L	PCT	W		L	PCT
Dayton	15	–	1	.938	23	–	7	.767
Duquesne	13	–	3	.813	25	–	8	.758
Fordham	12	–	4	.750	24	–	10	.706
George Mason	11	–	5	.688	24	–	10	.706
George Washington †	10	–	6	.625	19	–	14	.576
Saint Joseph's	10	–	6	.625	19	–	15	.559
Saint Louis	9	–	7	.563	17	–	16	.515
Richmond	8	–	8	.500	14	–	17	.452
Davidson	7	–	9	.438	12	–	18	.400
UMass	6	–	10	.375	14	–	16	.467
La Salle	3	–	13	.188	8	–	22	.267
St. Bonaventure	3	–	13	.188	8	–	22	.267
VCU	4	–	12	.250	7	–	22	.241
Rhode Island	1	–	15	.063	3	–	27	.100
† 2018 A10 Tournament winner As of 22 March 2018; Rankings from AP poll

The 2017–18 Dayton Flyers women's basketball team represented the University of Dayton during the 2017–18 NCAA Division I women's basketball season. The Flyers, led by the second-year head coach Shauna Green, played their home games at UD Arena and are members of the Atlantic 10 Conference. They finished the season 23–7, 15–1 in the A-10 play to win the A-10 regular season title. They advanced to the semifinals of the A-10 women's tournament, where they lost to George Washington. They received at-large bid to the NCAA women's tournament, where they lost to Marquette in the first round.

== Media ==
=== Dayton Flyers Sports Network ===
The Dayton Flyers Sports Network will broadcast Flyers games off their athletic website, DaytonFlyers.com, with Shane White on the call. Most home games will also be featured on the A-10 Digital Network. Selected games will be televised.

== Roster ==
2017–18 Dayton Flyers women's basketball team
Players
Coaches

Pos.	#	Name	Height	Year	Previous school	Hometown
G	1	Araion Bradshaw (redshirt)	5 ft 6 in (1.68 m)	So	Tabor Academy; South Carolina	Hyde Park, MA
F	2	Jordan Wilmoth	6 ft 3 in (1.91 m)	So	Immaculate Heart Academy	Chestnut Ridge, NY
F	3	Brittany Ward	6 ft 1 in (1.85 m)	RS So	Pike	Indianapolis, IN
G	4	Shakeela Fowler	5 ft 6 in (1.68 m)	Jr	Milwaukee King; Trinity Valley CC	Milwaukee, WI
G	5	Christine Szabo	5 ft 10 in (1.78 m)	So	Dublin Coffman	Dublin, OH
F/C	11	Alex Harris	6 ft 3 in (1.91 m)	RS Sr	Lorain; Penn State	Lorain, OH
G	12	Jenna Giacone	6 ft 1 in (1.85 m)	So	Bethlehem Central	Delmar, NY
F	13	Julia Chandler (redshirt)	6 ft 2 in (1.88 m)	Jr	Northern Secondary; Syracuse	Toronto, ON
G	14	Jenna Burdette	5 ft 8 in (1.73 m)	Sr	Reedsville Eastern	Coolville, OH
G	15	Tiaera Phillips	5 ft 11 in (1.8 m)	Jr	Valdosta; Chipola College	Valdosta, GA
F	23	Maddy Dennis	6 ft 2 in (1.88 m)	Jr	Mount Lawley	Perth, Western Australia
G	24	Lauren Cannatelli	5 ft 8 in (1.73 m)	Jr	Lakota West	Cincinnati, OH
G/F	30	Ashleigh Parksinson	6 ft 2 in (1.88 m)	Jr	Newark Catholic	Newark, OH
G	34	JaVonna Layfield	5 ft 11 in (1.8 m)	Sr	Ballard	Louisville, KY
G	42	Jayla Scaife	5 ft 10 in (1.78 m)	So	Muncie Central	Muncie, IN

Head coach

- Shauna Green (Canisius)

Assistant coach(es)

- Simon Harris (NC State)
- Calamity McEntire (Tennessee)
- Ryan Gensler (Saint Joseph's)

Legend

- (C) Team captain
- (S) Suspended
- (I) Ineligible
- (W) Walk-on
- Injured
- Current redshirt

Roster

== Schedule ==
Date time, TV	Rank^{#}	Opponent^{#}	Result	Record	Site (attendance) city, state
Exhibition
11/04/2017*; 2:00 pm		Findlay	W 91–65		UD Arena (1,386); Dayton, OH
Non-conference regular season
11/10/2017*; 8:00 pm		vs. Harvard; Maine Tip-Off Tournament semifinals	W 72–66	1–0	Memorial Gym (1,054); Orono, ME
11/11/2017*; 2:00 pm		vs. Tulane; Maine Tip-Off Tournament championship	W 71–65	2–0	Memorial Gym (303); Orono, ME
11/17/2017*; 7:00 pm		Morgan State	W 88–52	3–0	UD Arena (1,532); Dayton, OH
11/19/2017*; 2:00 pm, SPCSN		Virginia	W 61–46	4–0	UD Arena (1,866); Dayton, OH
11/22/2017*; 7:00 pm, ESPN3		at Toledo	L 50–68	4–1	Savage Arena (3,347); Toledo, OH
11/25/2017*; 2:00 pm		Arkansas–Pine Bluff	W 81–43	5–1	UD Arena (1,328); Dayton, OH
11/28/2017*; 7:00 pm, ESPN3		at Quinnipiac	L 66–72	5–2	TD Bank Sports Center (556); Hamden, CT
12/06/2017*; 11:00 am, SPCSN		No. 23 Green Bay	L 64–75	5–3	UD Arena (8,416); Dayton, OH
12/17/2017*; 2:00 pm		James Madison	W 82–54	6–3	UD Arena (1,665); Dayton, OH
12/20/2017*; 8:30 pm		vs. No. 22 South Florida; New Orleans Shootout	L 87–93 ^{OT}	6–4	Convocation Center (183); New Orleans, LA
12/21/2017*; 6:00 pm		vs. Mississippi Valley State; New Orleans Shootout	W 65–46	7–4	Convocation Center; New Orleans, LA
Atlantic 10 regular season
12/31/2017; 1:00 pm		at La Salle	W 76–47	8–4 (1–0)	Tom Gola Arena (306); Philadelphia, PA
01/04/2018; 7:00 pm		Rhode Island	W 116–58	9–4 (2–0)	UD Arena (1,615); Dayton, OH
01/07/2018; 2:00 pm		at Saint Joseph's	W 65–59	10–4 (3–0)	Hagan Arena (747); Philadelphia, PA
01/10/2018; 7:00 pm		St. Bonaventure	W 80–59	11–4 (4–0)	UD Arena (2,189); Dayton, OH
01/14/2018; 2:00 pm, ESPNU		Saint Louis	W 101–76	12–4 (5–0)	UD Arena (1,837); Dayton, OH
01/17/2018; 7:00 pm		at Fordham	W 63–62	13–4 (6–0)	Rose Hill Gymnasium (874); Bronx, NY
01/21/2018; 12:00 pm, CBSSN		George Washington	W 66–55	14–4 (7–0)	UD Arena (2,112); Dayton, OH
01/24/2018; 7:00 pm		at Richmond	W 66–59	15–4 (8–0)	Robins Center (674); Richmond, VA
01/27/2018; 2:00 pm		at Davidson	W 85–68	16–4 (9–0)	John M. Belk Arena (702); Davidson, NC
01/31/2018; 7:00 pm, SPCSN		Duquesne	W 79–70	17–4 (10–0)	UD Arena (3,223); Dayton, OH
02/04/2018; 2:00 pm, CBSSN		VCU	W 74–64	18–4 (11–0)	UD Arena (2,627); Dayton, OH
02/07/2018; 7:00 pm		at UMass	W 78–49	19–4 (12–0)	Mullins Center (312); Amherst, MA
02/11/2018; 12:00 pm, ESPNU		at George Washington	W 57–53	20–4 (13–0)	Charles E. Smith Center (946); Washington, D.C.
02/18/2018; 2:00 pm, SPCSN		Fordham	W 79–54	21–4 (14–0)	UD Arena (3,357); Dayton, OH
02/21/2018; 7:00 pm, SPCSN		George Mason	W 71–66	22–4 (15–0)	UD Arena (2,099); Dayton, OH
02/24/2018; 3:00 pm		at Saint Louis	L 72–85	22–5 (15–1)	Chaifetz Arena (4,461); St. Louis, MO
Atlantic 10 Women's Tournament
03/02/2018; 11:00 am	(1)	vs. (8) Richmond; Quarterfinals	W 67–58	23–5	Richmond Coliseum; Richmond, VA
03/03/2018; 11:00 am, CBSSN	(1)	vs. (5) George Washington; Semifinals	L 53–58	23–6	Richmond Coliseum; Richmond, VA
NCAA Women's Tournament
03/16/2018*; 2:30 pm, ESPN2	(9 L)	vs. (8 L) Marquette; First Round	L 65–84	23–7	KFC Yum! Center (7,229); Louisville, KY
*Non-conference game. ^{#}Rankings from AP Poll. (#) Tournament seedings in parentheses. L=Lexington Region. All times are in Eastern Time.

== Rankings ==
2017–18 NCAA Division I women's basketball rankings

Regular season polls
Poll	Pre- Season	Week 2	Week 3	Week 4	Week 5	Week 6	Week 7	Week 8	Week 9	Week 10	Week 11	Week 12	Week 13	Week 14	Week 15	Week 16	Week 17	Week 18	Week 19	Final
AP	NR	NR	NR	NR	NR	NR	NR	NR	NR	NR	NR	RV	RV	RV	RV	RV	RV	NR	NR	N/A
Coaches	RV	N/A	RV	NR	NR	NR	NR	NR	NR	NR	NR	NR	NR	NR	NR	RV	NR	NR	NR	

Legend
	Increase in ranking
	Decrease in ranking
	No change
(RV)	Received votes
(NR)	Not ranked

== See also ==
- 2017–18 Dayton Flyers men's basketball team
