= 2017–18 Davidson Wildcats women's basketball team =

Intercollegiate basketball season

2017–18 Davidson Wildcats women's basketball
- Conference: Atlantic 10 Conference
- Record: 12–18 (7–9 A-10)
- Head coach: Gayle Coats Fulks (1st season)
- Assistant coaches: Robyn Scherr-Wells; James Janssen; Lakevia Boykin
- Home arena: John M. Belk Arena

2017–18 Atlantic 10 women's basketball standings
| | Conf. | | | | Overall |
| Team | W | | L | PCT | W | | L | PCT |
|---|---|---|---|---|---|---|---|---|
| Dayton | 15 | – | 1 | .938 | 23 | – | 7 | .767 |
| Duquesne | 13 | – | 3 | .813 | 25 | – | 8 | .758 |
| Fordham | 12 | – | 4 | .750 | 24 | – | 10 | .706 |
| George Mason | 11 | – | 5 | .688 | 24 | – | 10 | .706 |
| George Washington † | 10 | – | 6 | .625 | 19 | – | 14 | .576 |
| Saint Joseph's | 10 | – | 6 | .625 | 19 | – | 15 | .559 |
| Saint Louis | 9 | – | 7 | .563 | 17 | – | 16 | .515 |
| Richmond | 8 | – | 8 | .500 | 14 | – | 17 | .452 |
| Davidson | 7 | – | 9 | .438 | 12 | – | 18 | .400 |
| UMass | 6 | – | 10 | .375 | 14 | – | 16 | .467 |
| La Salle | 3 | – | 13 | .188 | 8 | – | 22 | .267 |
| St. Bonaventure | 3 | – | 13 | .188 | 8 | – | 22 | .267 |
| VCU | 4 | – | 12 | .250 | 7 | – | 22 | .241 |
| Rhode Island | 1 | – | 15 | .063 | 3 | – | 27 | .100 |
† 2018 A10 Tournament winner As of 22 March 2018; Rankings from AP poll

The 2017–18 Davidson Wildcats women's basketball team represented Davidson College during the 2017–18 NCAA Division I women's basketball season. The Wildcats were led by first year head coach Gayle Coats Fulks. The Wildcats were fourth year members of the Atlantic 10 Conference and played their home games at the John M. Belk Arena. They finished the season 12–18, 7–9 in A-10 play to finish in ninth place. They lost in the first round of the A-10 women's tournament to Richmond.

== Media ==
=== Davidson Wildcats Sports Network ===
Select Wildcats games will be broadcast on Teamline with Derek Smith and Leslie Urban providing the call. Most home games will also be featured on the A-10 Digital Network. Select games will be televised.

== Roster ==
2017–18 Davidson Wildcats women's basketball team
Players
Coaches

| Pos. | # | Name | Height | Year | Previous school | Hometown |
|---|---|---|---|---|---|---|
| G | 0 | Kianna Speight | 5 ft 8 in (1.73 m) | Jr | Conway | Conway, AR |
| G | 1 | Katie Turner | 5 ft 8 in (1.73 m) | Fr | Bishop Manogue | Reno, NV |
| G | 2 | Saadia Timpton | 5 ft 8 in (1.73 m) | Sr | Myers Park | Charlotte, NC |
| F | 3 | Andrea Robinson | 6 ft 1 in (1.85 m) | So | McDonogh School | Randallstown, MD |
| G | 4 | Kelly Fitzgerald | 5 ft 6 in (1.68 m) | Fr | Green Hope | Apex, NC |
| G | 5 | Justine Lyon | 5 ft 9 in (1.75 m) | Jr | Hillside | Durham, NC |
| G/F | 11 | Sarah Donovan | 6 ft 0 in (1.83 m) | Fr | A.B. Lucas | Toronto, ON |
| F | 13 | Kyla Roland | 6 ft 2 in (1.88 m) | Jr | Harrison | Farmington Hills, MI |
| G | 21 | Chloe Johnson | 5 ft 7 in (1.7 m) | RS Sr | St. Mary's; San Diego State | Phoenix, AZ |
| G | 32 | Sae Abdul-Aziz | 5 ft 11 in (1.8 m) | Fr | Mohonasen | Schenectady, NY |
| F | 34 | Alana Davidson | 6 ft 2 in (1.88 m) | Fr | New Hope-Solebury | New Hope, PA |
| F | 42 | Ally Welling | 6 ft 3 in (1.91 m) | So | Concordia Lutheran | The Woodlands, TX |
| F | 44 | Mackenzie Latt | 6 ft 1 in (1.85 m) | Sr | Richland Gull Lake | Kalamazoo, MI |

Head coach

- Gayle Coats Fulks (Fairleigh Dickinson)

Assistant coach(es)

- Robyn Scherr-Wells (Michigan)
- James Janssen (Deakin)
- Lakevia Boykin (Wake Forest)

Legend

- (C) Team captain
- (S) Suspended
- (I) Ineligible
- (W) Walk-on
- Injured
- Current redshirt

Roster

== Schedule ==
| Date time, TV | Rank^{#} | Opponent^{#} | Result | Record | Site (attendance) city, state |
Exhibition
| 11/03/2017*; 5:00 pm | | Johnson C. Smith | W 81–69 | | John M. Belk Arena; Davidson, NC |
Non-conference regular season
| 11/10/2017*; 7:00 pm | | at Western Carolina | W 70–57 | 1–0 | Ramsey Center (797); Cullowhee, NC |
| 11/12/2017*; 2:00 pm, ACCN Extra | | at NC State | L 49–73 | 1–1 | Reynolds Coliseum (1,809); Raleigh, NC |
| 11/15/2017*; 7:00 pm, ESPN3 | | at Furman | L 62–65 | 1–2 | Timmons Arena (471); Greenville, SC |
| 11/19/2017*; 2:00 pm | | at Appalachian State | W 59–57 | 2–2 | Holmes Center (322); Boone, NC |
| 11/22/2017*; 7:00 pm | | UNC Asheville | W 58–50 | 3–2 | John M. Belk Arena (487); Davidson, NC |
| 11/25/2017*; 1:00 pm | | Princeton | L 57–62 | 3–3 | John M. Belk Arena (523); Davidson, NC |
| 11/27/2017*; 7:00 pm | | at William & Mary | L 55–73 | 3–4 | Kaplan Arena (376); Williamsburg, VA |
| 12/03/2017*; 2:00 pm, ESPN3 | | at Mercer | L 54–69 | 3–5 | Hawkins Arena (832); Macon, GA |
| 12/06/2017*; 7:00 pm | | Elon | L 58–75 | 3–6 | John M. Belk Arena (365); Davidson, NC |
| 12/15/2017*; 11:30 am | | Gardner–Webb | L 65–70 | 3–7 | John M. Belk Arena (1,323); Davidson, NC |
| 12/18/2017*; 7:00 pm | | at High Point | W 82–74 | 4–7 | Millis Center (504); High Point, NC |
| 12/21/2017*; 2:00 pm | | Charlotte | W 68–66 | 5–7 | John M. Belk Arena (379); Davidson, NC |
| 12/28/2017*; 2:00 pm | | at UCF | L 54–62 | 5–8 | CFE Arena (3,035); Orlando, FL |
Atlantic 10 regular season
| 12/31/2017; 2:00 pm | | at George Mason | L 61–74 | 5–9 (0–1) | EagleBank Arena (876); Fairfax, VA |
| 01/04/2018; 7:00 pm | | Duquesne | L 54–79 | 5–10 (0–2) | John M. Belk Arena (387); Davidson, NC |
| 01/07/2018; 2:00 pm | | Rhode Island | W 77–67 | 6–10 (1–2) | John M. Belk Arena (259); Davidson, NC |
| 01/10/2018; 12:00 pm | | at Fordham | L 58–66 | 6–11 (1–3) | Rose Hill Gymnasium (2,435); Bronx, NY |
| 01/14/2018; 2:00 pm | | at Richmond | W 68–65 | 7–11 (1–4) | Robins Center (654); Richmond, VA |
| 01/17/2018; 7:00 pm | | George Washington | L 48–53 | 7–12 (2–4) | John M. Belk Arena (243); Davidson, NC |
| 01/20/2018; 2:00 pm | | at St. Bonaventure | W 75–68 | 8–12 (3–4) | Reilly Center (975); Olean, NY |
| 01/24/2018; 7:00 pm | | UMass | W 87–81 ^{2OT} | 9–12 (4–4) | John M. Belk Arena (941); Davidson, NC |
| 01/27/2018; 2:00 pm | | Dayton | L 68–85 | 9–13 (4–5) | John M. Belk Arena (702); Davidson, NC |
| 01/31/2018; 11:00 am | | at Rhode Island | W 79–67 | 10–13 (5–5) | Ryan Center (596); Kingston, RI |
| 02/04/2018; 3:00 pm | | at Saint Louis | L 72–88 | 10–14 (5–6) | Chaifetz Arena (637); St. Louis, MO |
| 02/10/2018; 2:00 pm | | Fordham | L 45–58 | 10–15 (5–7) | John M. Belk Arena (485); Davidson, NC |
| 02/14/2018; 7:00 pm | | Saint Joseph's | L 62–64 | 10–16 (5–8) | John M. Belk Arena (321); Davidson, NC |
| 02/17/2018; 2:00 pm | | at UMass | L 68–70 | 10–17 (5–9) | Mullins Center (731); Amherst, NY |
| 02/21/2018; 7:00 pm | | at La Salle | W 58–51 | 11–17 (6–9) | Tom Gola Arena (550); Philadelphia, PA |
| 02/24/2018; 2:00 pm | | VCU | W 69–63 | 12–17 (7–9) | John M. Belk Arena (871); Davidson, NC |
Atlantic 10 Women's Tournament
| 02/27/2018; 7:00 pm | (9) | at (8) Richmond; First Round | L 53–62 | 12–18 | Robins Center (451); Richmond, VA |
*Non-conference game. ^{#}Rankings from AP Poll. (#) Tournament seedings in parentheses. All times are in Eastern Time.

== Rankings ==
2017–18 NCAA Division I women's basketball rankings

Regular season polls
| Poll | Pre- Season | Week 2 | Week 3 | Week 4 | Week 5 | Week 6 | Week 7 | Week 8 | Week 9 | Week 10 | Week 11 | Week 12 | Week 13 | Week 14 | Week 15 | Week 16 | Week 17 | Week 18 | Week 19 | Final |
|---|---|---|---|---|---|---|---|---|---|---|---|---|---|---|---|---|---|---|---|---|
| AP | | | | | | | | | | | | | | | | | | | | N/A |
| Coaches | | | | | | | | | | | | | | | | | | | | |

Legend
| | Increase in ranking |
| | Decrease in ranking |
| | No change |
| (RV) | Received votes |
| (NR) | Not ranked |

== See also ==
- 2017–18 Davidson Wildcats men's basketball team
