= Carolina Day School =

Location
- 1345 Hendersonville Road; Asheville, North Carolina 28803; United States; 35°31′20″N 82°31′48″W

Information
- Type: Private
- Established: 1987 (39 years ago)
- CEEB code: 340119
- Head of school: Ben Farrell
- Enrollment: 600
- Colors: Red, white, blue
- Athletics: North Carolina Independent Schools Athletic Association (NCISAA)
- Mascot: Willy the Wildcat
- Annual tuition: Junior Kindergarten: $23,100 Kindergarten: $25,300 Grades 1–3: $29,100 Grade 4: $30,400 Grades 5–7: $32,300 Grade 8 $36,200 Grades 9–10 $38,400 Grades 11–12 $40,100 Key School (Grades 2–8 for dyslexia): $54,900
- Website: carolinaday.org

Carolina Day School is an independent, co-ed, college preparatory school serving grades junior kindergarten through 12. The school is in the town of Biltmore Forest (a town completely encircled by Asheville, North Carolina). Carolina Day (CDS) is an independent, secular JK–12 school, consisting of a lower (JK–5), middle (6–8), and upper school (9–12) and the Key School (2–8).

Key Schoolwas established in 1997 to provide a high-quality, innovative education for bright children with language-based learning differences, like dyslexia, dysgraphia, and/or dyscalculia. As a division of Carolina Day School, students and families who join Key School are an integrated and important part of community life at CDS. Key School uses the Orton-Gillingham method and offers small classes (Language classes are generally a 4:1 student teacher ratio) to support students and assist them in moving to self-advocacy and independence in learning.

Carolina Day School is a member of the North Carolina Association of Independent Schools and the National Association of Independent Schools.

== History ==
Carolina Day School was founded in 1987 through the merger of Asheville Country Day School and St. Genevieve/Gibbons Hall. There are three predecessor schoolsthat contribute to the rich educational tradition of today's Carolina Day School: St.Genevieve of the Pines, St. Genevieve Gibbons Hall, and Asheville Country Day School.

Asheville Country Day School, which thrived on the current campus, was established in 1936 as a private day school.

Established in 1908, St. Genevieve-of-the-Pines was a Catholic day and boarding school, which emphasized a strong foundation in the liberal arts. The St. Genevieve property was sold to Asheville-Buncombe Technical Community College when the schools merged in 1987.

On June 15th, 2015, the lower school started being renovated by Clark Nexson. The renovations included creating a new library, adding solar panels, and other miscellaneous updates. The renovations were finished on January 16th, 2016
