= 2017–18 NCAA Division I women's basketball season =

American college basketball season

- Preseason AP No. 1: Connecticut
- Regular season: November 10, 2017 – March 2, 2018
- NCAA Tournament: 2018
- Tournament dates: March 23, 2018 – April 1, 2018
- National Championship: Nationwide Arena; Columbus, Ohio
- NCAA Champions: Notre Dame
- Other champions: Indiana (WNIT); Yale (WBI)
- Player of the Year (Naismith, Wooden): A'ja Wilson, South Carolina

The 2017–18 NCAA Division I women's basketball season began on November 10, 2017 and ended with the Final Four title game at Nationwide Arena in Columbus, Ohio on April 1, 2018. Practices officially began in September 29, 2017.

== Season headlines ==
=== Milestones and records ===
- November 13 and 16 – Chastadie Barrs of Lamar recorded triple-doubles in consecutive games, making her the eighth Division I women's player to do so. First, she recorded 14 points, 10 assists and 10 steals in a 93–62 win over Division III Louisiana College. Barrs fell one rebound short of a quadruple-double in this game. She then recorded 24 points, 10 rebounds and 11 steals in the Cardinals' 92–49 blowout of NAIA school Southwestern Assemblies of God.
- November 13 and 17 – On the night after Barrs recorded her second straight triple-double, Sabrina Ionescu of Oregon matched the feat, becoming the ninth Division I women's player to do so. In the preseason WNIT, Ionescu recorded 29 points, 10 rebounds and 11 assists in Oregon's quarterfinal against Drake, followed by 16 points, 11 assists and 10 rebounds against Texas A&M in the semifinals. This gave the sophomore six triple-doubles in her career, one shy of what was then the Division I women's record of seven.
- November 25 – Kelsey Mitchell of Ohio State became the all-time Division I women's leader in made three-pointers. Mitchell's seven three-pointers in the Buckeyes' 104–62 romp over Florida Gulf Coast gave her 402 for her career, surpassing the previous record of 398 by Connecticut's Kaleena Mosqueda-Lewis.
- December 17 – Ionescu recorded her seventh career triple-double, tying the NCAA women's all-divisions record then held by Suzie McConnell-Serio (Penn State) and Louella Tomlinson (Saint Mary's). She had 21 points, 11 rebounds and 14 assists in the Ducks' 90–46 blowout of Ole Miss.
- December 19 – Two coaches recorded their 1,000th career wins. First, North Carolina's Sylvia Hatchell reached the milestone when the Tar Heels defeated Grambling State 79–63. Later in the evening, Geno Auriemma reached the milestone when UConn defeated Oklahoma 88–64. Auriemma became the fastest coach in either men's or women's Division I history to reach 1,000 wins, doing so in his 33rd season and 1,135th game.
- December 31 – Ionescu took sole possession of the record for career triple-doubles with 24 points, 14 rebounds and 10 assists in the Ducks' 94–83 win over Washington. This game was also the 500th career win for Ducks head coach Kelly Graves.
- January 3 – Grambling State's Shakyla Hill became the first player in Division I basketball to record a quadruple-double since Lester Hudson in 2007, and the first to do so in D-I women's play since 1993. She had 15 points, 10 rebounds, 10 assists and 10 steals in the Lady Tigers' 93–71 win over Alabama State.
- January 7 – Mercer's KeKe Calloway hit 12 three-pointers in the Bears' 86–64 win at Furman, tying a Division I women's single-game record.
- January 13 – Mitchell became the 13th Division I women's player with 3,000 career points, reaching the milestone with her first two points in the Buckeyes' 77–62 win at Indiana.
- January 27 – Mitchell became the all-time scoring leader in the Big Ten Conference, surpassing Rachel Banham of Minnesota during the Buckeyes' 78–62 win over Michigan State.
- February 1 – Chattanooga's Jim Foster became the eighth NCAA women's coach and the seventh in Division I with 900 career wins, reaching the mark with a 58–41 win over Western Carolina.
- February 3 – In a more ignominious milestone, Chicago State set a new Division I women's record with its 59th consecutive loss, reaching the mark with a 59–43 home loss to Grand Canyon.
- February 17 – Oregon's Ruthy Hebard set a new Division I women's record for consecutive field goals made, going 12-for-12 in the Ducks' 80–74 double-overtime win over USC to finish the game with an ongoing streak of 30. The previous record of 28 was set in 1998 by Southern Utah's Myndee Kay Larsen.
- February 19 – Hebard made her first three basket attempts in Oregon's 101–94 overtime win over UCLA, ending with a streak of 33 consecutive field goals, the NCAA Division I record for a player of either sex. She had entered the game even with Yale's Brandon Sherrod, who had a streak of 30 in 2016.
- March 16 – Ionescu recorded her sixth triple-double of the season in Oregon's 88–45 first-round NCAA tournament win over Seattle with 19 points, 10 rebounds and 11 assists. This matched the single-season Division I triple-double record, previously accomplished by Danielle Carson of Youngstown State in 1985–86, and also in men's play by BYU's Kyle Collinsworth in both 2014–15 and 2015–16. It was also the 16th triple-double in Division I women's tournament history, and the first since Iowa's Samantha Logic in 2015.
- March 17 – UConn crushed Saint Francis (PA) 140–52 in the first round of the NCAA tournament, setting a new scoring record for a Division I women's tournament game. The only team to score more points in a Division I tournament game was the Loyola Marymount men, who scored 149 in a 1990 game against Michigan.

== Conference membership changes ==
Three schools joined new conferences for the 2017–18 season.

School	Former conference	New conference
IUPUI	Summit League	Horizon League
Valparaiso	Horizon League	Missouri Valley Conference
Wichita State	Missouri Valley Conference	American Athletic Conference

In addition to the schools changing conferences, the 2017–18 season was the last for four schools in their then-current conferences:

- North Dakota left the Big Sky Conference for the Summit League.
- Hampton and USC Upstate, respectively, left the Mid-Eastern Athletic Conference and Atlantic Sun Conference (ASUN) to become members of the Big South Conference.
- Liberty left the Big South to join the ASUN.

== Arenas ==
=== New arenas ===
- DePaul played its first season at Wintrust Arena, which replaced McGrath–Phillips Arena (though the DePaul women's volleyball team continues to use the older venue).
- NJIT played its first season at the Wellness and Events Center, replacing Fleisher Center.
- UMBC began the season at the Retriever Activities Center, the team's home since 1973, but the school opened the new UMBC Event Center in February 2018. The new facility opened on February 3 with the UMBC men hosting Vermont; the women's first game there was on February 8 against Binghamton.
- Wofford played its first season at Jerry Richardson Indoor Stadium, replacing Benjamin Johnson Arena.

=== Arenas closing ===
- Elon played its final season at Alumni Gym, which opened in 1950 for the Elon men's team and had housed the women's team since its first season of 1971–72. The school opened the new Schar Center, with more than three times the capacity of Alumni Gym, for the 2018 women's volleyball season (which precedes the basketball season).

=== Temporary arenas ===
Four Division I women's teams played the 2017–18 season in temporary homes due to renovation of their current venues. A fifth played in a temporary home following the demolition of its previous venue to accommodate a new arena.

- Cincinnati, which normally plays at the on-campus Fifth Third Arena, played most of its home games at the gymnasium of nearby Catholic girls' school St. Ursula Academy, also taking some games to the nearby campus of local community college Cincinnati State College.
- Houston renovated Hofheinz Pavilion, which was renamed Fertitta Center upon its reopening. The renovated venue was expected to open by the start of the 2018–19 season, but construction delays pushed back the reopening to December 2018. The Cougars played at Texas Southern's Health and Physical Education Arena, and continued to play there until Fertitta Center reopened.
- Northwestern played at Beardsley Gym on the campus of Evanston Township High School while Welsh–Ryan Arena was being renovated.
- Robert Morris closed the Charles L. Sewall Center, home to the Colonials since 1985, in June 2017. The UPMC Events Center, under construction at the Sewall Center site, was scheduled to open in the middle of the 2018–19 basketball season. Until that time, the Colonials played home games at the Student Recreation and Fitness Center, which opened in September 2017 at the university's North Athletic Complex as part of the UPMC Events Center project. (Later construction delays pushed back the opening of the UPMC Events Center to the 2019–20 season.)
- Villanova played at its former on-campus home of Jake Nevin Field House during renovations to its normal home of The Pavilion, which was renamed Finneran Pavilion when it reopened for 2018–19.

== Preseason polls ==
The top 25 from the AP and USA Today Coaches polls

Associated Press
Ranking	Team
1	Connecticut (22)
2	Texas
3	Baylor
4	South Carolina
5	Ohio State
6	Notre Dame
7	Mississippi State
8	UCLA
9	Louisville
10	Stanford
11	Oregon
12	Duke
13	West Virginia
14	Tennessee
15	Maryland
16	Missouri
17	Marquette
18	Florida State
19	Oregon State
20	Texas A&M
20	California
22	Oklahoma
23	South Florida
24	Michigan
25	DePaul

USA Today Coaches
Ranking	Team
1	Connecticut (25)
2	South Carolina (7)
3	Baylor
4	Mississippi State
5	Notre Dame
6	Texas
7	UCLA
8	Ohio State
9	Stanford
10	Louisville
11	Oregon
12	Duke
13	Maryland
14	Florida State
15	West Virginia
16	Missouri
17	Oregon State
18	Tennessee
19	Marquette
20	DePaul
21	Oklahoma
22	South Florida
23	Michigan
24	Miami (FL)
25	California
25	Washington

== Regular season ==
=== Early preseason tournament ===
==== Tournament upsets ====
For this list, an "upset" is defined as a win by a team seeded 7 or more spots below its defeated opponent.

Date	Winner	Score	Loser	Region	Round
March 16	Minnesota (10)	89–77	Green Bay (7)	Spokane	Round of 64
March 16	Virginia (10)	68–62	California (7)	Albany	Round of 64
March 17	Central Michigan (11)	78–69	LSU (6)	Spokane	Round of 64
March 17	Buffalo (11)	102–79	South Florida (6)	Albany	Round of 64
March 17	Florida Gulf Coast (12)	80–70	Missouri (5)	Lexington	Round of 64
March 17	Creighton (11)	76–70	Iowa (6)	Kansas City	Round of 64
March 19	Buffalo (11)	86–65	Florida State (3)	Albany	Round of 32
March 19	Central Michigan (11)	95–78	Ohio State (3)	Spokane	Round of 32

=== Conference winners and tournaments ===
Each of the 32 Division I athletic conferences ends its regular season with a single-elimination tournament. The team with the best regular-season record in each conference is given the number one seed in each tournament, with tiebreakers used as needed in the case of ties for the top seeding. The winners of these tournaments receive automatic invitations to the 2018 NCAA Division I women's basketball tournament.

Conference	Regular season first place	Conference player of the year	Conference Coach of the Year	Conference tournament	Tournament venue (city)	Tournament winner
America East Conference	Maine	Imani Watkins, Binghamton	Amy Vachon, Maine	2018 America East women's basketball tournament	First round: Campus sites Quarterfinals/semifinals: Cross Insurance Arena (Portland, ME); Final: Top surviving seed	Maine
American Athletic Conference	UConn	Katie Lou Samuelson, UConn	Jose Fernandez, South Florida	2018 American Athletic Conference women's basketball tournament	Mohegan Sun Arena (Uncasville, CT)	UConn
Atlantic 10 Conference	Dayton	Natalie Butler, George Mason	Shauna Green, Dayton	2018 Atlantic 10 women's basketball tournament	First round: Campus sites Remainder: Richmond Coliseum (Richmond, VA)	George Washington
Atlantic Coast Conference	Louisville (Note: Top seed in conference tournament); Notre Dame	Asia Durr, Louisville	Jeff Walz, Louisville	2018 ACC women's basketball tournament	Greensboro Coliseum (Greensboro, NC)	Louisville
Atlantic Sun Conference	Florida Gulf Coast	Loren Cagle, Lipscomb	Karl Smesko, Florida Gulf Coast	2018 ASUN women's basketball tournament	Campus sites	Florida Gulf Coast
Big 12 Conference	Baylor	Kalani Brown, Baylor	Kim Mulkey, Baylor	2018 Big 12 Conference women's basketball tournament	Chesapeake Energy Arena (Oklahoma City, OK)	Baylor
Big East Conference	Marquette; DePaul	Allazia Blockton, Marquette	Carolyn Kieger, Marquette & Harry Perretta, Villanova	2018 Big East women's basketball tournament	Wintrust Arena (Chicago, IL)	DePaul
Big Sky Conference	Northern Colorado	Savannah Smith, Northern Colorado	Kamie Ethridge, Northern Colorado	2018 Big Sky Conference women's basketball tournament	Reno Events Center (Reno, NV)	Northern Colorado
Big South Conference	Liberty	Keyen Green, Liberty	Mike McGuire, Radford	2018 Big South Conference women's basketball tournament	Vines Center (Lynchburg, VA)	Liberty
Big Ten Conference	Ohio State	Kelsey Mitchell, Ohio State (coaches); Megan Gustafson, Iowa (media)	Amy Williams, Nebraska	2018 Big Ten Conference women's basketball tournament	Bankers Life Fieldhouse (Indianapolis, IN)	Ohio State
Big West Conference	UC Davis	Channon Fluker, Cal State Northridge	Jennifer Gross, UC Davis	2018 Big West Conference women's basketball tournament	First round and quarterfinals: Titan Gym (Fullerton, CA); Semifinals and final: Honda Center (Anaheim, CA)	Cal State Northridge
Colonial Athletic Association	Drexel; James Madison	Nicole Enabosi, Delaware	Denise Dillon, Drexel	2018 CAA women's basketball tournament	Daskalakis Athletic Center (Philadelphia, PA)	Elon
Conference USA	UAB	Tashia Brown, Western Kentucky	Randy Norton, UAB	2018 Conference USA women's basketball tournament	Ford Center (Frisco, TX)	Western Kentucky
Horizon League	Green Bay	Chelsea Welch, Wright State	Austin Parkinson, IUPUI	2018 Horizon League women's basketball tournament	Little Caesars Arena (Detroit, MI)	Green Bay
Ivy League	Princeton	Bella Alarie, Princeton	Courtney Banghart, Princeton	2018 Ivy League women's basketball tournament	Palestra (Philadelphia, PA)	Princeton
Metro Atlantic Athletic Conference	Quinnipiac	Victoria Rampado, Niagara	Tricia Fabbri, Quinnipiac	2018 MAAC women's basketball tournament	Times Union Center (Albany, NY)	Quinnipiac
Mid-American Conference	Central Michigan	Tinara Moore, Central Michigan	Sue Guevara, Central Michigan	2018 Mid-American Conference women's basketball tournament	First round: Campus sites Remainder: Quicken Loans Arena (Cleveland, OH)	Central Michigan
Mid-Eastern Athletic Conference	Bethune–Cookman; North Carolina A&T	Angel Golden, Bethune–Cookman	Vanessa Blair-Lewis, Bethune–Cookman	2018 MEAC women's basketball tournament	Norfolk Scope (Norfolk, VA)	North Carolina A&T
Missouri Valley Conference	Drake	Becca Hittner, Drake	Jennie Baranczyk, Drake	2018 Missouri Valley Conference women's basketball tournament	TaxSlayer Center (Moline, IL)	Drake
Mountain West Conference	Boise State; UNLV	Liv Roberts, Wyoming	Joe Legerski, Wyoming	2018 Mountain West Conference women's basketball tournament	Thomas & Mack Center (Paradise, NV)	Boise State
Northeast Conference	Robert Morris; Saint Francis (PA)	Jessica Kovatch, Saint Francis (PA)	Charlie Buscaglia, Robert Morris	2018 Northeast Conference women's basketball tournament	Quarterfinals and semifinals: Top two seeds Final: Top remaining seed	Saint Francis (PA)
Ohio Valley Conference	Belmont	Ke'Shunan James, Murray State	Bart Brooks, Belmont	2018 Ohio Valley Conference women's basketball tournament	Ford Center (Evansville, IN)	Belmont
Pac-12 Conference	Oregon	Sabrina Ionescu, Oregon	Tara VanDerveer, Stanford (coaches); Kelly Graves, Oregon (media)	2018 Pac-12 Conference women's basketball tournament	KeyArena (Seattle, WA)	Oregon
Patriot League	American	Emily Kinneston, American	Megan Gebbia, American	2018 Patriot League women's basketball tournament	Campus sites	American
Southeastern Conference	Mississippi State	A'ja Wilson, South Carolina	Vic Schaefer, Mississippi State	2018 SEC women's basketball tournament	Bridgestone Arena (Nashville, TN)	South Carolina
Southern Conference	Mercer	Kahlia Lawrence, Mercer	Susie Gardner, Mercer	2018 Southern Conference women's basketball tournament	U.S. Cellular Center (Asheville, NC)	Mercer
Southland Conference	Lamar	Cassidy Barrios, Nicholls	Robin Harmony, Lamar	2018 Southland Conference women's basketball tournament	Leonard E. Merrell Center (Katy, TX)	Nicholls State
Southwestern Athletic Conference	Southern	Joyce Kennerson, Texas Southern	Sandy Pugh, Southern	2018 SWAC women's basketball tournament	Quarterfinals: Campus sites Semifinals and final: Delmar Fieldhouse (Houston, TX)	Grambling State
The Summit League	South Dakota	Macy Miller, South Dakota State	Dawn Plitzuweit, South Dakota	2018 Summit League women's basketball tournament	Denny Sanford Premier Center (Sioux Falls, SD)	South Dakota State
Sun Belt Conference	Little Rock	Taeler Deer, Texas State	Joe Foley, Little Rock	2018 Sun Belt Conference women's basketball tournament	Lakefront Arena (New Orleans, LA)	Little Rock
West Coast Conference	Gonzaga	Jill Barta, Gonzaga	Lisa Fortier, Gonzaga	2018 West Coast Conference women's basketball tournament	Orleans Arena (Paradise, NV)	Gonzaga
Western Athletic Conference	New Mexico State	Brooke Salas, New Mexico State	Brooke Atkinson, New Mexico State	2018 WAC women's basketball tournament	Orleans Arena (Paradise, NV)	Seattle

== Award winners ==
=== All-America teams ===
The NCAA has never recognized a consensus All-America team in women's basketball. This differs from the practice in men's basketball, in which the NCAA uses a combination of selections by the Associated Press (AP), the National Association of Basketball Coaches (NABC), the Sporting News and the United States Basketball Writers Association (USBWA) to determine a consensus All-America team. The selection of a consensus team is possible because all four organizations select at least a first and second team, with only the USBWA not selecting a third team.

Of the major selectors in women's basketball, the AP and USBWA divide their selections into separate teams, but the 2017–18 season was the first in which the USBWA did so. The women's counterpart to the NABC, the Women's Basketball Coaches Association (WBCA), continues the USBWA's former practice of selecting a single 10-member (plus ties) team. The NCAA does not recognize Sporting News as an All-America selector in women's basketball.

=== Major player of the year awards ===
- Wooden Award: A'ja Wilson, South Carolina
- Naismith Award: A'ja Wilson, South Carolina
- Associated Press Player of the Year: A'ja Wilson, South Carolina
- Wade Trophy: A'ja Wilson, South Carolina
- Ann Meyers Drysdale Women's Player of the Year (USBWA): A'ja Wilson, South Carolina
- espnW National Player of the Year: A'ja Wilson, South Carolina

=== Major freshman of the year awards ===
- USBWA National Freshman of the Year: Chennedy Carter, Texas A&M
- WBCA Freshman of the Year: Chennedy Carter, Texas A&M
- espnW Freshman of the Year: Chennedy Carter, Texas A&M

=== Major coach of the year awards ===
- Associated Press Coach of the Year: Muffet McGraw, Notre Dame
- Naismith College Coach of the Year: Vic Schaefer, Mississippi State
- WBCA National Coach of the Year: Vic Schaefer, Mississippi State
- espnW Coach of the Year: Muffet McGraw, Notre Dame

=== Other major awards ===
- Nancy Lieberman Award (top point guard): Sabrina Ionescu, Oregon
- Ann Meyers Drysdale Award (top shooting guard; inaugural award): Victoria Vivians, Mississippi State
- Cheryl Miller Award (top small forward; inaugural award): Gabby Williams, Connecticut
- Katrina McClain Award (top power forward; inaugural award): Ruthy Hebard, Oregon
- Lisa Leslie Award (top center; inaugural award): A'ja Wilson, South Carolina
- WBCA Defensive Player of the Year: Kia Nurse, Connecticut
- Naismith Women's Defensive Player of the Year (inaugural award): Teaira McCowan, Mississippi State
- Senior CLASS Award: Gabby Williams, Connecticut
- Maggie Dixon Award (top rookie head coach): Bart Brooks, Belmont
- Academic All-American of the Year (top scholar-athlete): Cherise Beynon, New Mexico
- Elite 90 Award (top GPA among upperclass players at Final Four): Jordan Danberry, Mississippi State
- Pat Summitt Most Courageous Award: Avery Marz, Saint Joseph's player

== Conference standings ==
2017–18 American Athletic Conference women's basketball standings
	Conf.				Overall
Team	W		L	PCT	W		L	PCT
No. 1 UConn †	16	–	0	1.000	36	–	1	.973
No. 19 South Florida	13	–	3	.813	26	–	8	.765
UCF	12	–	4	.750	22	–	11	.667
Cincinnati	10	–	6	.625	19	–	13	.594
Houston	9	–	7	.563	20	–	12	.625
Wichita State	9	–	7	.563	14	–	17	.452
East Carolina	7	–	9	.438	16	–	15	.516
Tulane	5	–	11	.313	14	–	17	.452
Memphis	5	–	11	.313	10	–	20	.333
SMU	4	–	12	.250	10	–	20	.333
Temple	3	–	13	.188	12	–	19	.387
Tulsa	3	–	13	.188	10	–	21	.323
† 2018 American Tournament winner As of 30 March 2018; Rankings from AP poll

2017–18 America East Conference women's basketball standings
	Conf.				Overall
Team	W		L	PCT	W		L	PCT
Maine †	13	–	3	.813	23	–	10	.697
Albany	12	–	4	.750	24	–	8	.750
Binghamton	10	–	6	.625	20	–	12	.625
Stony Brook	10	–	6	.625	18	–	12	.600
Hartford	9	–	7	.563	19	–	13	.594
New Hampshire	9	–	7	.563	19	–	12	.613
Vermont	5	–	11	.313	8	–	22	.267
UMBC	3	–	13	.188	5	–	26	.161
UMass Lowell	1	–	15	.063	4	–	26	.133
† 2018 America East tournament winner As of 20 March 2018; Rankings from AP poll

2017–18 Atlantic 10 women's basketball standings
	Conf.				Overall
Team	W		L	PCT	W		L	PCT
Dayton	15	–	1	.938	23	–	7	.767
Duquesne	13	–	3	.813	25	–	8	.758
Fordham	12	–	4	.750	24	–	10	.706
George Mason	11	–	5	.688	24	–	10	.706
George Washington †	10	–	6	.625	19	–	14	.576
Saint Joseph's	10	–	6	.625	19	–	15	.559
Saint Louis	9	–	7	.563	17	–	16	.515
Richmond	8	–	8	.500	14	–	17	.452
Davidson	7	–	9	.438	12	–	18	.400
UMass	6	–	10	.375	14	–	16	.467
La Salle	3	–	13	.188	8	–	22	.267
St. Bonaventure	3	–	13	.188	8	–	22	.267
VCU	4	–	12	.250	7	–	22	.241
Rhode Island	1	–	15	.063	3	–	27	.100
† 2018 A10 Tournament winner As of 22 March 2018; Rankings from AP poll

2017–18 ASUN women's basketball standings
	Conf.				Overall
Team	W		L	PCT	W		L	PCT
Florida Gulf Coast †	13	–	1	.929	31	–	5	.861
Jacksonville	12	–	2	.857	24	–	9	.727
Stetson	8	–	6	.571	17	–	15	.531
Lipscomb	7	–	7	.500	12	–	19	.387
USC Upstate	6	–	8	.429	11	–	19	.367
North Florida	5	–	9	.357	13	–	18	.419
Kennesaw State	3	–	11	.214	7	–	19	.269
NJIT	2	–	12	.143	4	–	26	.133
† 2018 ASUN Tournament winner As of 19 March 2018; Rankings from AP poll

2017–18 ACC women's basketball standings
	Conf.				Overall
Team	W		L	PCT	W		L	PCT
No. 3 Louisville *†	15	–	1	.938	36	–	3	.923
No. 5 Notre Dame	15	–	1	.938	35	–	3	.921
No. 11 Florida State	12	–	4	.750	26	–	7	.788
No. 21 NC State	11	–	5	.688	26	–	9	.743
No. 20 Duke	11	–	5	.688	24	–	9	.727
Syracuse	10	–	6	.625	22	–	9	.710
Miami (FL)	10	–	6	.625	21	–	11	.656
Virginia	10	–	6	.625	19	–	14	.576
Virginia Tech	6	–	10	.375	23	–	14	.622
Georgia Tech	6	–	10	.375	20	–	14	.588
Wake Forest	5	–	11	.313	14	–	17	.452
North Carolina	4	–	12	.250	15	–	16	.484
Pittsburgh	2	–	14	.125	10	–	20	.333
Boston College	2	–	14	.125	7	–	23	.233
Clemson	1	–	15	.063	11	–	19	.367
† 2018 ACC tournament winner * Tournament #1 seed As of 31 March 2018; Rankings from AP poll

2017–18 Big East Conference women's basketball standings
	Conf.				Overall
Team	W		L	PCT	W		L	PCT
DePaul †	15	–	3	.833	27	–	8	.771
Marquette	15	–	3	.833	24	–	10	.706
Villanova	12	–	6	.667	23	–	9	.719
Creighton	11	–	7	.611	19	–	13	.594
St. John's	9	–	9	.500	19	–	15	.559
Georgetown	9	–	9	.500	16	–	16	.500
Seton Hall	7	–	11	.389	16	–	16	.500
Butler	6	–	12	.333	15	–	17	.469
Xavier	3	–	15	.167	10	–	20	.333
Providence	3	–	15	.167	10	–	21	.323
† 2018 Big East tournament winner As of 25 March 2018; Rankings from AP poll

2017–18 Big Sky women's basketball standings
	Conf.				Overall
Team	W		L	PCT	W		L	PCT
Northern Colorado †	15	–	3	.833	26	–	7	.788
Idaho	13	–	5	.722	19	–	14	.576
Eastern Washington	12	–	6	.667	17	–	14	.548
Weber State	12	–	6	.667	21	–	11	.656
Idaho State	11	–	7	.611	21	–	11	.656
Portland State	11	–	7	.611	19	–	13	.594
Montana	9	–	9	.500	14	–	17	.452
Montana State	9	–	9	.500	16	–	15	.516
North Dakota	5	–	13	.278	12	–	18	.400
Sacramento State	5	–	13	.278	7	–	23	.233
Northern Arizona	4	–	14	.222	7	–	23	.233
Southern Utah	2	–	16	.111	3	–	27	.100
† 2018 Big Sky tournament winner As of 19 March 2018; Rankings from AP poll

2017–18 Big South women's basketball standings
	Conf.				Overall
Team	W		L	PCT	W		L	PCT
Liberty †	16	–	2	.889	24	–	10	.706
Radford	15	–	3	.833	24	–	9	.727
UNC Asheville	12	–	6	.667	17	–	16	.515
High Point	10	–	8	.556	17	–	14	.548
Presbyterian	9	–	9	.500	12	–	18	.400
Gardner–Webb	8	–	10	.444	19	–	13	.594
Campbell	8	–	10	.444	15	–	15	.500
Charleston Southern	5	–	13	.278	11	–	20	.355
Longwood	5	–	13	.278	7	–	23	.233
Winthrop	2	–	16	.111	3	–	27	.100
† 2018 Big South tournament winner As of March 17, 2018; Rankings from AP poll

2017–18 Big Ten women's basketball standings
	Conf.				Overall
Team	W		L	PCT	W		L	PCT
No. 10 Ohio State †	13	–	3	.813	28	–	7	.800
No. 16 Maryland	12	–	4	.750	26	–	8	.765
Iowa	11	–	5	.688	24	–	8	.750
Minnesota	11	–	5	.688	24	–	9	.727
Nebraska	11	–	5	.688	21	–	11	.656
Michigan	10	–	6	.625	23	–	10	.697
Indiana	9	–	7	.563	23	–	14	.622
Purdue	9	–	7	.563	20	–	14	.588
Rutgers	7	–	9	.438	20	–	12	.625
Michigan State	7	–	9	.438	19	–	14	.576
Penn State	6	–	10	.375	16	–	16	.500
Northwestern	4	–	12	.250	12	–	20	.375
Wisconsin	2	–	14	.125	9	–	21	.300
Illinois	0	–	16	.000	9	–	21	.300
† 2018 Big Ten tournament winner Rankings from AP poll

2017–18 Big West women's basketball standings
	Conf.				Overall
Team	W		L	PCT	W		L	PCT
UC Davis	14	–	2	.875	28	–	7	.800
Cal Poly	11	–	5	.688	17	–	12	.586
UC Irvine	10	–	6	.625	18	–	13	.581
UC Santa Barbara	9	–	7	.563	12	–	17	.414
Cal State Northridge †	8	–	8	.500	19	–	16	.543
UC Riverside	6	–	10	.375	11	–	22	.333
Long Beach State	6	–	10	.375	8	–	23	.258
Hawaii	5	–	11	.313	12	–	18	.400
Cal State Fullerton	3	–	13	.188	8	–	21	.276
† 2018 Big West tournament winner As of 25 March 2018; Rankings from AP poll

2017–18 Big 12 Conference women's basketball standings
	Conf.				Overall
Team	W		L	PCT	W		L	PCT
No. 2 Baylor †	18	–	0	1.000	33	–	2	.943
No. 8 Texas	15	–	3	.833	28	–	7	.800
Oklahoma State	11	–	7	.611	21	–	11	.656
Oklahoma	11	–	7	.611	16	–	15	.516
TCU	9	–	9	.500	23	–	13	.639
West Virginia	8	–	10	.444	25	–	12	.676
Iowa State	7	–	11	.389	14	–	17	.452
Kansas State	7	–	11	.389	18	–	16	.529
Kansas	3	–	15	.167	12	–	18	.400
Texas Tech	1	–	17	.056	7	–	23	.233
† 2018 Big 12 Tournament winner Rankings from AP poll

2017–18 CAA women's basketball standings
	Conf.				Overall
Team	W		L	PCT	W		L	PCT
Drexel	16	–	2	.889	27	–	8	.771
James Madison	16	–	2	.889	23	–	11	.676
Elon †	14	–	4	.778	25	–	8	.758
Delaware	11	–	7	.611	19	–	13	.594
Northeastern	11	–	7	.611	16	–	15	.516
William & Mary	7	–	11	.389	16	–	14	.533
Hofstra	5	–	13	.278	11	–	19	.367
UNC Wilmington	4	–	14	.222	12	–	19	.387
Towson	4	–	14	.222	9	–	21	.300
College of Charleston	2	–	16	.111	7	–	24	.226
† 2018 CAA tournament winner Rankings from AP poll

2017–18 Conference USA women's basketball standings
	Conf.				Overall
Team	W		L	PCT	W		L	PCT
UAB	13	–	3	.813	27	–	7	.794
Western Kentucky †	12	–	4	.750	24	–	9	.727
Rice	10	–	6	.625	23	–	10	.697
Louisiana Tech	10	–	6	.625	19	–	12	.613
Middle Tennessee	10	–	6	.625	18	–	13	.581
Charlotte	10	–	6	.625	14	–	16	.467
UTEP	7	–	9	.438	17	–	14	.548
Florida Atlantic	7	–	9	.438	13	–	15	.464
Southern Miss	7	–	9	.438	15	–	15	.500
North Texas	6	–	10	.375	17	–	14	.548
UTSA	6	–	10	.375	9	–	21	.300
Old Dominion	6	–	10	.375	8	–	23	.258
FIU	5	–	11	.313	8	–	21	.276
Marshall	3	–	13	.188	9	–	20	.310
† 2018 C-USA tournament winner As of 20 March 2018; Rankings from AP poll

2017–18 Horizon League women's basketball standings
	Conf.				Overall
Team	W		L	PCT	W		L	PCT
No. 21 Green Bay †	16	–	2	.889	29	–	4	.879
IUPUI	13	–	5	.722	22	–	10	.688
Wright State	12	–	6	.667	23	–	11	.676
Milwaukee	11	–	7	.611	21	–	12	.636
Cleveland State	11	–	7	.611	19	–	11	.633
Youngstown State	11	–	7	.611	16	–	16	.500
Oakland	7	–	11	.389	15	–	16	.484
Northern Kentucky	6	–	12	.333	9	–	22	.290
Detroit	2	–	16	.111	2	–	28	.067
UIC	1	–	17	.056	8	–	22	.267
† 2018 Horizon League Tournament winner As of 18 March 2018; Rankings from AP poll

2017–18 Ivy League women's basketball standings
	Conf.				Overall
Team	W		L	PCT	W		L	PCT
Princeton †	12	–	2	.857	24	–	6	.800
Penn	11	–	3	.786	22	–	9	.710
Harvard	10	–	4	.714	18	–	11	.621
Yale	8	–	6	.571	19	–	13	.594
Dartmouth	7	–	7	.500	15	–	12	.556
Brown	3	–	11	.214	15	–	12	.556
Cornell	3	–	11	.214	7	–	20	.259
Columbia	2	–	12	.143	8	–	21	.276
† 2018 Ivy League Tournament winner Rankings from AP Poll

2017–18 Mid-American Conference women's basketball standings
	Conf.				Overall
Team	W		L	PCT	W		L	PCT
East
Buffalo	16	–	2	.889	29	–	6	.829
Miami (OH)	12	–	6	.667	21	–	11	.656
Ohio	9	–	9	.500	16	–	15	.516
Kent State	5	–	13	.278	13	–	19	.406
Bowling Green	3	–	15	.167	11	–	19	.367
Akron	3	–	15	.167	9	–	21	.300
West
Central Michigan †	17	–	1	.944	30	–	5	.857
Ball State	13	–	5	.722	25	–	7	.781
Western Michigan	9	–	9	.500	18	–	15	.545
Toledo	8	–	10	.444	18	–	15	.545
Northern Illinois	7	–	11	.389	15	–	15	.500
Eastern Michigan	6	–	12	.333	11	–	20	.355
† 2018 MAC tournament winner As of March 24, 2018

2017–18 MAAC women's basketball standings
	Conf.				Overall
Team	W		L	PCT	W		L	PCT
Quinnipiac †	18	–	0	1.000	28	–	6	.824
Marist	14	–	4	.778	20	–	14	.588
Siena	11	–	7	.611	17	–	14	.548
Rider	10	–	8	.556	14	–	17	.452
Fairfield	10	–	8	.556	13	–	17	.433
Manhattan	9	–	9	.500	13	–	18	.419
Niagara	9	–	9	.500	13	–	18	.419
Canisius	8	–	10	.444	10	–	20	.333
Monmouth	7	–	11	.389	10	–	21	.323
Iona	2	–	16	.111	2	–	28	.067
Saint Peter's	1	–	17	.056	4	–	26	.133
† 2018 MAAC tournament winner As of March 19, 2018; Rankings from AP poll

2017–18 MEAC women's basketball standings
	Conf.				Overall
Team	W		L	PCT	W		L	PCT
Bethune–Cookman	15	–	1	.938	24	–	7	.774
North Carolina A&T †	15	–	1	.938	23	–	9	.719
Hampton	12	–	4	.750	18	–	14	.563
Norfolk State	11	–	5	.688	18	–	11	.621
Morgan State	8	–	8	.500	16	–	15	.516
Howard	8	–	8	.500	12	–	18	.400
Maryland-Eastern Shore	7	–	9	.438	11	–	19	.367
North Carolina Central	7	–	9	.438	9	–	21	.300
South Carolina State	6	–	10	.375	12	–	18	.400
Coppin State	5	–	11	.313	6	–	23	.207
Delaware State	5	–	11	.313	6	–	24	.200
Florida A&M	4	–	12	.250	8	–	24	.250
Savannah State	1	–	15	.063	5	–	25	.167
† 2018 MEAC tournament winner As of 16 March 2018; Rankings from AP poll

2017–18 Missouri Valley Conference women's basketball standings
	Conf.				Overall
Team	W		L	PCT	W		L	PCT
Drake †	18	–	0	1.000	26	–	8	.765
Missouri State	15	–	3	.833	21	–	12	.636
Northern Iowa	13	–	5	.722	19	–	14	.576
Southern Illinois	11	–	7	.611	17	–	14	.548
Indiana State	9	–	9	.500	11	–	19	.367
Illinois State	8	–	10	.444	14	–	16	.467
Bradley	6	–	12	.333	13	–	18	.419
Valparaiso	5	–	13	.278	13	–	18	.419
Loyola–Chicago	5	–	13	.278	7	–	23	.233
Evansville	0	–	18	.000	3	–	27	.100
† 2018 MVC tournament winner As of March 17, 2018

2017–18 Mountain West Conference women's basketball standings
	Conf.				Overall
Team	W		L	PCT	W		L	PCT
Boise State †	14	–	4	.778	23	–	10	.697
UNLV	14	–	4	.778	19	–	12	.613
Wyoming	13	–	5	.722	22	–	11	.667
Colorado State	11	–	7	.611	21	–	12	.636
Fresno State	11	–	7	.611	17	–	15	.531
New Mexico	10	–	8	.556	25	–	11	.694
Nevada	7	–	11	.389	19	–	17	.528
San Diego State	5	–	13	.278	11	–	19	.367
Utah State	5	–	13	.278	7	–	23	.233
Air Force	5	–	13	.278	6	–	25	.194
San Jose State	4	–	14	.222	7	–	23	.233
† 2018 MW Tournament winner Rankings from AP poll

2017–18 Northeast Conference women's basketball standings
	Conf.				Overall
Team	W		L	PCT	W		L	PCT
Robert Morris	16	–	2	.889	25	–	8	.758
Saint Francis (PA) †	16	–	2	.889	24	–	10	.706
Sacred Heart	9	–	9	.500	14	–	17	.452
St. Francis Brooklyn	9	–	9	.500	13	–	17	.433
LIU Brooklyn	8	–	10	.444	13	–	18	.419
Bryant	8	–	10	.444	9	–	21	.300
Fairleigh Dickinson	7	–	11	.389	15	–	15	.500
Central Connecticut	7	–	11	.389	7	–	23	.233
Mount St. Mary's	6	–	12	.333	9	–	20	.310
Wagner	4	–	14	.222	6	–	23	.207
† 2018 NEC tournament winner As of March 17, 2018; Rankings from AP poll

2017–18 Ohio Valley Conference women's basketball standings
	Conf.				Overall
Team	W		L	PCT	W		L	PCT
No. 23 Belmont †	18	–	0	1.000	31	–	4	.886
UT Martin	13	–	5	.722	19	–	15	.559
SIU Edwardsville	13	–	5	.722	17	–	15	.531
Morehead State	12	–	6	.667	21	–	11	.656
Jacksonville State	12	–	6	.667	19	–	12	.613
Austin Peay	9	–	9	.500	16	–	14	.533
Southeast Missouri State	9	–	9	.500	14	–	17	.452
Murray State	7	–	11	.389	11	–	19	.367
Eastern Kentucky	5	–	13	.278	8	–	19	.296
Tennessee Tech	4	–	14	.222	7	–	22	.241
Tennessee State	4	–	14	.222	6	–	21	.222
Eastern Illinois	2	–	16	.111	3	–	26	.103
† 2018 OVC tournament winner As of March 17, 2018; Rankings from AP poll

2017–18 Pac-12 Conference women's basketball standings
	Conf.				Overall
Team	W		L	PCT	W		L	PCT
No. 6 Oregon †	16	–	2	.889	33	–	5	.868
No. 15 Stanford	14	–	3	.824	24	–	11	.686
No. 9 UCLA	14	–	4	.778	27	–	8	.771
No. 13 Oregon State	14	–	4	.778	26	–	8	.765
California	11	–	7	.611	21	–	11	.656
Arizona State	10	–	8	.556	22	–	13	.629
USC	9	–	9	.500	20	–	11	.645
Utah	8	–	10	.444	18	–	14	.563
Colorado	5	–	13	.278	15	–	16	.484
Washington State	3	–	14	.176	10	–	20	.333
Arizona	2	–	16	.111	6	–	24	.200
Washington	1	–	17	.056	7	–	23	.233
† 2018 Pac-12 Tournament winner As of 26 March 2018; Rankings from AP Poll

2017–18 Patriot League women's basketball standings
	Conf.				Overall
Team	W		L	PCT	W		L	PCT
American †	16	–	2	.889	26	–	7	.788
Bucknell	15	–	3	.833	22	–	10	.688
Navy	13	–	5	.722	25	–	8	.758
Army	9	–	9	.500	17	–	14	.548
Lehigh	9	–	9	.500	15	–	15	.500
Holy Cross	7	–	11	.389	12	–	18	.400
Loyola (MD)	7	–	11	.389	9	–	21	.300
Lafayette	6	–	12	.333	11	–	19	.367
Boston University	5	–	13	.278	10	–	19	.345
Colgate	3	–	15	.167	7	–	23	.233
† 2018 Patriot League tournament winner As of 16 March 2018; Rankings from AP poll

2017–18 Southern Conference women's basketball standings
	Conf.				Overall
Team	W		L	PCT	W		L	PCT
No. 25 Mercer †	14	–	0	1.000	30	–	3	.909
East Tennessee State	11	–	3	.786	20	–	13	.606
Chattanooga	8	–	6	.571	17	–	13	.567
Furman	7	–	7	.500	18	–	14	.563
Samford	6	–	8	.429	15	–	16	.484
UNC Greensboro	6	–	8	.429	13	–	18	.419
Wofford	3	–	11	.214	10	–	20	.333
Western Carolina	1	–	13	.071	5	–	25	.167
† 2018 SoCon Tournament winner As of March 19, 2018

2017–18 Southland Conference women's basketball standings
	Conf.				Overall
Team	W		L	PCT	W		L	PCT
Lamar	17	–	1	.944	22	–	7	.759
Stephen F. Austin	16	–	2	.889	25	–	6	.806
Central Arkansas	14	–	4	.778	25	–	10	.714
Texas A&M-CC	11	–	7	.611	19	–	12	.613
Nicholls State †	11	–	7	.611	19	–	13	.594
New Orleans	11	–	7	.611	15	–	15	.500
Abilene Christian	9	–	9	.500	16	–	14	.533
McNeese State	8	–	10	.444	12	–	18	.400
Southeastern Louisiana	7	–	11	.389	8	–	21	.276
Houston Baptist	6	–	12	.333	10	–	18	.357
Incarnate Word	4	–	14	.222	5	–	24	.172
Northwestern State	2	–	16	.111	7	–	22	.241
Sam Houston State	1	–	17	.056	4	–	23	.148
† 2018 Southland tournament winner Rankings from AP poll

2017–18 SEC women's basketball standings
	Conf.				Overall
Team	W		L	PCT	W		L	PCT
No. 4 Mississippi State	16	–	0	1.000	37	–	2	.949
No. 7 South Carolina †	12	–	4	.750	29	–	7	.806
No. 18 Georgia	12	–	4	.750	26	–	7	.788
No. 12 Tennessee	11	–	5	.688	25	–	8	.758
No. 17 Missouri	11	–	5	.688	24	–	8	.750
No. 14 Texas A&M	11	–	5	.688	26	–	10	.722
No. 24 LSU	11	–	5	.688	19	–	10	.655
Alabama	7	–	9	.438	20	–	14	.588
Kentucky	6	–	10	.375	15	–	17	.469
Auburn	5	–	11	.313	14	–	15	.483
Arkansas	3	–	13	.188	13	–	18	.419
Florida	3	–	13	.188	11	–	19	.367
Vanderbilt	3	–	13	.188	7	–	24	.226
Ole Miss	1	–	15	.063	12	–	19	.387
† 2018 SEC tournament winner As of April 1, 2018; Rankings from AP poll

2017–18 SWAC women's basketball standings
	Conf.				Overall
Team	W		L	PCT	W		L	PCT
Southern	14	–	4	.778	17	–	13	.567
Texas Southern	13	–	5	.722	19	–	12	.613
Grambling State †	13	–	5	.722	19	–	13	.594
Prairie View A&M	12	–	6	.667	15	–	16	.484
Jackson State	10	–	8	.556	15	–	13	.536
Alcorn State	8	–	10	.444	12	–	18	.400
Alabama A&M	6	–	12	.333	11	–	18	.379
Arkansas-Pine Bluff	6	–	12	.333	8	–	21	.276
Alabama State	6	–	12	.333	8	–	22	.267
Mississippi Valley State	2	–	16	.111	2	–	28	.067
† 2018 SWAC tournament winner Rankings from AP poll

2017–18 Sun Belt Conference women's basketball standings
	Conf.				Overall
Team	W		L	PCT	W		L	PCT
Little Rock †	17	–	1	.944	23	–	10	.697
Texas State	14	–	4	.778	23	–	10	.697
UT Arlington	12	–	6	.667	18	–	12	.600
Troy	12	–	6	.667	18	–	13	.581
South Alabama	11	–	7	.611	21	–	13	.618
Coastal Carolina	10	–	8	.556	17	–	14	.548
Louisiana	10	–	8	.556	17	–	16	.515
Arkansas State	10	–	8	.556	15	–	15	.500
Appalachian State	5	–	13	.278	8	–	23	.258
Georgia State	4	–	14	.222	8	–	22	.267
Georgia Southern	2	–	16	.111	5	–	25	.167
Louisiana–Monroe	1	–	17	.056	4	–	26	.133
† 2018 Sun Belt tournament winner

2017–18 Summit League women's basketball standings
	Conf.				Overall
Team	W		L	PCT	W		L	PCT
South Dakota	14	–	0	1.000	29	–	7	.806
South Dakota State †	12	–	2	.857	26	–	7	.788
Western Illinois	10	–	4	.714	22	–	10	.688
Oral Roberts	7	–	7	.500	17	–	13	.567
Denver	7	–	7	.500	16	–	14	.533
Omaha	3	–	11	.214	12	–	16	.429
North Dakota State	2	–	12	.143	9	–	20	.310
Fort Wayne	1	–	13	.071	4	–	24	.143
† 2018 Summit League Tournament winner As of March 25, 2018; Rankings from AP Poll

2017–18 West Coast Conference women's basketball standings
	Conf.				Overall
Team	W		L	PCT	W		L	PCT
Gonzaga †	17	–	1	.944	27	–	6	.818
Saint Mary's	13	–	5	.722	20	–	11	.645
Loyola Marymount	11	–	7	.611	19	–	11	.633
BYU	11	–	7	.611	16	–	14	.533
San Francisco	10	–	8	.556	16	–	15	.516
San Diego	8	–	10	.444	17	–	15	.531
Pacific	7	–	11	.389	15	–	17	.469
Pepperdine	5	–	13	.278	10	–	21	.323
Santa Clara	5	–	13	.278	9	–	21	.300
Portland	3	–	15	.167	7	–	23	.233
† 2018 WCC tournament winner As of 17 March 2018; Rankings from AP poll

2017–18 WAC women's basketball standings
	Conf.				Overall
Team	W		L	PCT	W		L	PCT
New Mexico State	11	–	3	.786	18	–	12	.600
Cal State Bakersfield	10	–	4	.714	18	–	13	.581
Seattle U †	9	–	5	.643	18	–	14	.563
Grand Canyon	9	–	5	.643	16	–	14	.533
UMKC	7	–	7	.500	11	–	19	.367
Utah Valley	5	–	9	.357	11	–	19	.367
UT Rio Grande Valley	4	–	10	.286	14	–	16	.467
Chicago State	1	–	13	.071	1	–	29	.033
† 2018 WAC tournament winner As of March 16, 2018; Rankings from AP poll

== Coaching changes ==
Several teams changed coaches during and after the season.

Team	Former coach	Interim coach	New coach	Reason
Albany	Joanna Bernabei-McNamee		Colleen Mullen	Bernabei-McNamee left Albany on April 10 after two seasons for Boston College. On May 14, former Army assistant Colleen Mullen was named the Great Danes' new head coach.
Akron	Jodi Kest		Melissa Jackson	On April 21, Kest announced her retirement after 12 seasons at Akron and 26 seasons as a head coach, finishing with an overall record of 405–348. The school promoted top assistant Jackson to head coach on June 27.
Boston College	Erik Johnson		Joanna Bernabei-McNamee	Johnson resigned from his position on March 1 after six seasons. He finished with a record of 68–115 overall and 19–77 in ACC play. BC announced on April 10 that it had hired Albany's Bernabei-McNamee as the new head coach.
Boston University	Katy Steding		Marisa Moseley	Steding was fired on March 13 after four years in which the Terriers went 31–88 without a winning season. BU announced UConn assistant and BU alum Moseley as the new head coach on April 17.
Bowling Green	Jennifer Roos		Robyn Fralick	Roos was fired from BGSU on March 8 after six seasons. The Falcons went 92–97 during Roos' tenure, capped off by an 11–19 season. The Falcons hired Fralick from Division II in-state power Ashland fresh off a loss in the Division II title game that broke a 73-game winning streak.
Binghamton	Linda Cimino		Bethann Ord	Cimino left Binghamton on May 18 after four seasons for the St. Francis Brooklyn opening. The school tabbed Weber State's Ord as the next head coach on June 15.
Canisius	Terry Zeh		Scott Hemer	Zeh was fired from Canisius on March 8 after 14 seasons and a 195–233 overall record. The Golden Griffins' 10–20 mark this season was their ninth straight losing season. Canisius went to Division III for its new hire, announcing SUNY Geneseo head coach Hemer as Zeh's replacement on April 23.
Chattanooga	Jim Foster		Katie Burrows	Foster announced his retirement on May 8 after five seasons with the Mocs and 40 overall as a D-I head coach. He retired with a 120–40 record at Chattanooga and 903–347 overall, with a coaching tree that includes Hall of Famers Geno Auriemma and Muffet McGraw. The Mocs named top assistant Burrows as interim head coach while the school searched for its new coach, and removed the interim tag on May 25.
Chicago State	Angela Jackson		Misty Opat	Chicago State fired Jackson on the week of March 5 after 15 seasons, although it wasn't officially confirmed until March 12. After a nearly five-month search, the school hired Misty Opat from Rock Valley College of NJCAA Division III on August 7.
Cincinnati	Jamelle Elliott		Michelle Clark-Heard	Cincinnati announced on March 21 that Elliott would not return after nine seasons as head coach. The Bearcats announced Western Kentucky's Clark-Heard, who had previously served as assistant coach at Cincinnati, as the new head coach on March 27.
Clemson	Audra Smith		Amanda Butler	Smith was fired from Clemson on March 27 after five seasons. The Tigers went 52–99 overall and 9–70 in ACC play during her tenure, capped off by an overall record this season of 11–19 with only one win in ACC play. Former Florida head coach Butler, who had been out of coaching since being fired from her alma mater at the end of the 2016–17 season, was announced as Smith's replacement on April 12.
Cleveland State	Kate Peterson Abiad		Chris Kielsmeier	On March 19, Peterson Abiad announced that she would step down to focus on her family. She finished with a 15-year record of 206–252 at Cleveland State. On April 17, former Wayne State head coach Chris Kielsmeier was announced as the next head coach for the Vikings.
Delaware State	Barbara Burgess	Kyle Adams	David Caputo	On February 21, Burgess was fired after 3 seasons at Delaware State. She finished at Delaware State with a 3-year record of 17–69. Assistant Kyle Adams was named interim head coach of the Hornets for the remainder of the season. On August 10, the school hired UNC Wilimington assistant Caputo as the program's next head coach.
East Carolina	Heather Macy	Chad Killinger; Nicole Mealing		After an internal review revealed a misunderstanding of practice rules, Macy announced her resignation from East Carolina on October 17, 2018 after 8 seasons, finishing as the program's most-winning coach with 134 wins. Assistant coach Killinger was initially named interim head coach of the Pirates for the 2018–19 season, but health concerns led to his resignation 11 games into the season on December 26, 2018, and Killinger's top assistant Mealing was named interim coach for the rest of the season.
Gardner–Webb	Rick Reeves		Alex Simmons	On April 3, Reeves announced his retirement after 14 seasons at Gardner–Webb and 32 seasons as head coach. He finished with an overall record of 483–456, and also was the program's most-winning head coach with 216 wins. On April 24, former Ole Miss assistant Alex Simmons was named the next head coach for the Runnin' Bulldogs.
Georgia State	Sharon Baldwin-Tener		Gene Hill	On March 14, head coach Sharon Baldwin's contract was not renewed. She finished with an 88–152 record in eight seasons. On April 19, former NC State assistant Gene Hill was named the Panthers' next head coach.
Indiana State	Josh Keister		Vicki Hall	On March 21, former Toledo associate head coach Vicki Hall was named the next head coach for the Sycamores.
Jackson State	Surina Dixon		Tomekia Reed	On March 2, Surina Dixon's contract was not renewed. She finished at Jackson State with aa 82–93 record in six seasons. On April 15, Jackson State hired former Hinds Community College head coach Tomekia Reed as its new head coach.
Jacksonville	Yolett McPhee-McCuin		Darnell Haney	McPhee-McCuin left Jacksonville on April 4 after five seasons for the Ole Miss vacancy. On April 10, former Jacksonville assistant head coach Darnell Haney was named the new head coach for the Dolphins.
La Salle	Jeff Williams		Mountain MacGillivray	On March 2, Jeff Williams' contract was not renewed. He finished 92–149 in eight seasons at La Salle. On April 21, La Salle hired former Quinnipiac assistant coach Mountain MacGillivray as the new head coach of the Explorers.
Longwood	Bill Reinson		Rebecca Tillett	Reinson and Longwood "parted ways" on March 9, following eight seasons in which Reinson went 58–177 and 28–86 in Big South Conference play. On April 12, Navy assistant Rebecca Tillett was announced as his replacement.
Minnesota	Marlene Stollings		Lindsay Whalen	Stollings left Minnesota on April 9 after four seasons for the Texas Tech opening. The Gophers announced on April 12 that former Gophers and current Minnesota Lynx player Whalen would become the new head coach while still playing for the Lynx. In a postscript, Whalen announced on August 13 that she would retire from play at the end of the 2018 WNBA season.
NJIT	Steve Lanpher		Mike Lane	Lanpher resigned from his position on March 9 after 6 seasons at NJIT. On May 21, NJIT hired former Bucknell assistant coach Mike Lane as the new head coach of the Highlanders.
Northern Colorado	Kamie Ethridge		Jennifer Roulier-Huth	Ethridge left Northern Colorado on April 16 after four seasons for Washington State. On April 30, former UCLA assistant head coach Jennifer Roulier-Huth was named the new head coach for the Bears.
Ole Miss	Matt Insell		Yolett McPhee-McCuin	Insell was fired from Ole Miss on March 2 after the Rebels finished the season 12–19 and a last-place 1–15 in the SEC. He went 70–87 overall in five seasons, including 18–62 in SEC play. The Rebels hired McPhee-McCuin away from Jacksonville on April 4.
Pittsburgh	Suzie McConnell-Serio		Lance White	McConnell-Serio was fired from Pitt on April 5 after five seasons and a 10–20 finish this past season. Although she led the Panthers to the 2015 NCAA tournament, the team failed to win more than 13 games in any of her final three seasons, finishing 67–87 overall during her tenure. On April 18, Pittsburgh hired former Florida State assistant Lance White.
Prairie View A&M	Ravon Justice		Sandy Pugh	Justice left Prairie View A&M on April 12 after two seasons for the Sam Houston State job. Southern's Sandy Pugh was hired as her replacement on May 7.
Presbyterian	Todd Steelman		Alaura Sharp	Steelman resigned from his position on March 13 after just two seasons at Presbyterian. On April 24, former Louisiana Tech assistant coach Alaura Sharp was named the next head coach of the Blue Hose.
St. Francis Brooklyn	John Thurston		Linda Cimino	Thurston announced his retirement on April 5 after six seasons at St. Francis Brooklyn and 23 seasons overall as head coach. On May 18, the Terriers hired former Binghamton head coach Linda Cimino.
Saint Peter's	Pat Coyle		Marc Mitchell	Coyle announced her resignation from Saint Peter's on March 16. She finished at Saint Peter's with a 4-year record of 19–132. On March 26, former Fairleigh Dickinson–Florham head coach Marc Mitchell was named as Coyle's replacement.
Sam Houston State	Brenda Welch-Nichols		Ravon Justice	Welch-Nicholls and Sam Houston State agreed to "part ways" on March 7, following twelve seasons. She finished with a 119–234 record in 12 seasons at Sam Houston. On April 12, former Prairie View A&M head coach Ravon Justice was announced as her replacement.
South Carolina State	Doug Robertson, Jr.		Audra Smith	On March 27 Robertson's contract was not renewed, ending his 10-year tenure at South Carolina State with a 112–175 record. Former Clemson coach Audra Smith was named the new head coach on June 8.
Southern	Sandy Pugh		Carlos Funchess	Pugh left after 18 seasons to take the Prairie View A&M job. Top assistant Funchess was elevated to head coach after serving on the staff for the past 13 seasons.
Southern Utah	Chris Boettcher		Tracy Sanders	On March 13, Boettcher was fired. He finished at Southern Utah with a 4-year record of 29–92. On April 18, former Saint Mary's assistant Tracy Sanders was named the next head coach of the Thunderbirds.
Texas Tech	Candi Whitaker	Shimmy Gray-Miller	Marlene Stollings	Whitaker was fired on January 1 after a 6–7 start, capped off by blowout losses in the Lady Raiders' first two Big 12 games. She was 54–82 overall in her fifth season at her alma mater, with the Lady Raiders having no .500 seasons during her tenure. Assistant Gray-Miller was named interim head coach for the remainder of the season. Tech hired Stollings away from Minnesota, formally introducing her on April 9.
UMass Lowell	Jenerrie Harris		Tom Garrick	On March 5, Harris' contract was not renewed, ending her 4-year tenure at UMass Lowell with a 28–91 record. On April 12, former Boston College assistant coach Tom Garrick was named the next head coach of the River Hawks.
UIC	Regina Miller		Tasha Pointer	Miller and the school agreed to "part ways" on March 6, following seven seasons. She finished at UIC with a 7-year record of 95–122. On April 3, former Northwestern assistant Tasha Pointer was named as Miller's replacement.
UTRGV	Larry Tidwell		Lane Lord	Tidwell resigned from his position on April 21 after 5 seasons at UTRGV to become the chief of staff for the women's basketball program at Texas Tech. He finished at UTRGV with a 5-year record of 85–75. On May 21, UTRGV hired former Pittsburg State head coach Lane Lord as the new head coach of the Vaqueros.
Valparaiso	Tracey Dorow		Mary Evans	On March 6, Dorow announced that she would take a medical leave of absence to recover from major neck surgery. On April 13, former Ohio assistant coach Mary Evans was named the next head coach of the Crusaders.
Vermont	Chris Day	Alisa Kresge		Day announced his resignation on April 27 after two seasons, following an internal investigation into his verbal conduct. UVM elevated assistant Kresge to interim head coach through the 2018–19 season. On April 10, 2019, Kresge had the interim tag removed and became head coach of the Catamounts.
Virginia	Joanne Boyle		Tina Thompson	Boyle announced her retirement on March 20. She initially cited an unspecified family matter, but later revealed that she retired because of snags in her ongoing attempt to finalize the adoption of her 6-year-old Senegalese daughter. The Cavaliers went 129–98 in her seven seasons, capped off by the program's first NCAA tournament appearance since 2009. UVA hired former WNBA star, incoming member of both the Naismith and Women's Halls of Fame, and current Texas assistant Thompson on April 16.
Washington State	June Daugherty		Kamie Ethridge	Daugherty was fired on March 13 after 11 seasons and a 130–218 overall record, ending with a 10–20 record in a season she did not finish due to health issues. The Cougars failed to make the NCAA tournament during her tenure. WSU hired Northern Colorado head coach Ethridge on April 16.
Weber State	Bethann Ord		Velaida Harris	Ord left after seven seasons to take the Binghamton job. The school hired Rhode Island assistant Velaida Harris as her replacement on July 17.
Western Kentucky	Michelle Clark-Heard		Greg Collins	Clark-Heard left her alma mater on March 27 after six seasons for the Cincinnati opening. The Lady Toppers elevated assistant Collins the same day.

== See also ==
- 2017–18 NCAA Division I men's basketball season
