= 2017–18 NJIT Highlanders women's basketball team =

Intercollegiate basketball season

2017–18 NJIT Highlanders women's basketball
- Conference: Atlantic Sun Conference
- Record: 4–26 (2–12 A-Sun)
- Head coach: Steve Lanpher (6th season)
- Assistant coaches: Bob Dubina; Liz Flooks; Rayven Johnson
- Home arena: Wellness and Events Center

2017–18 ASUN women's basketball standings
	Conf.				Overall
Team	W		L	PCT	W		L	PCT
Florida Gulf Coast †	13	–	1	.929	31	–	5	.861
Jacksonville	12	–	2	.857	24	–	9	.727
Stetson	8	–	6	.571	17	–	15	.531
Lipscomb	7	–	7	.500	12	–	19	.387
USC Upstate	6	–	8	.429	11	–	19	.367
North Florida	5	–	9	.357	13	–	18	.419
Kennesaw State	3	–	11	.214	7	–	19	.269
NJIT	2	–	12	.143	4	–	26	.133
† 2018 ASUN Tournament winner As of 19 March 2018; Rankings from AP poll

The 2017–18 NJIT Highlanders women's basketball team represented New Jersey Institute of Technology during the 2017–18 NCAA Division I women's basketball season. The Highlanders, led by sixth-year head coach Steve Lanpher, played their home games at the Wellness and Events Center in Newark, New Jersey. They were third-year members of the Atlantic Sun Conference (A-Sun). They finished the season 4–26, 2–12 in A-Sun play, to finish in last place. They lost in the quarterfinals of A-Sun tournament to Florida Gulf Coast.

On March 8, 2018, head coach Steve Lanpher resigned. He finished at NJIT with a six-year record of 55–124.

== Roster ==
2017–18 NJIT Highlanders women's basketball team
Players
Coaches

Pos.	#	Name	Height	Year	Previous school	Hometown
G	0	Amber Morgan	5 ft 5 in (1.65 m)	So	Lawrence North	Indianapolis, IN
G	5	Maddie Martin	5 ft 7 in (1.7 m)	Fr	Dunmore	Dunmore, PA
G	10	Jillian Libby	5 ft 11 in (1.8 m)	RS So	Cheverus	South Portland, ME
G	11	Jordan Ireland	5 ft 7 in (1.7 m)	Jr	Garnet Valley	Garnet Valley, PA
G/F	12	Taj Lewis	5 ft 10 in (1.78 m)	Sr	Longmeadow; Roxbury CC	Springfield, MA
G	13	Kelly Guarino	5 ft 9 in (1.75 m)	RS Jr	Albertus Magnus	Thiells, NY
G	14	Amarri Trueheart	5 ft 3 in (1.6 m)	RS So	Cheltenham; Albany	Cheltenham, PA
G	20	Danielle Tunstall	5 ft 11 in (1.8 m)	So	Life Center Academy	Willingboro, NJ
F	21	Lucia Martinez-Ortiz	6 ft 2 in (1.88 m)	Fr	Colegio Internacional Nuevo Centro	Guadarrama, Spain
G	22	Tatianna Torres	5 ft 10 in (1.78 m)	RS Jr	Thomas A. Edison	Arlington, VA
G	23	Isi Enahoro	5 ft 8 in (1.73 m)	Fr	Sayreville War Memorial	Sayreville, NJ
G	24	Tracey Brereton	5 ft 9 in (1.75 m)	So	Matawan Regional	Aberdeen, NJ
G	25	Dez Allen	5 ft 10 in (1.78 m)	Fr	Neptune	Neptune, NJ
G	44	Ellyn Stoll	5 ft 8 in (1.73 m)	Fr	St. Rose	Point Pleasant, NJ
F		Milena Bajic (redshirt)	6 ft 1 in (1.85 m)	Jr	Gimnazija Slobodan Škerović; Memphis	Podgorica, Montenegro

Head coach

- Steve Lanpher (St. Joseph)

Assistant coach(es)

- Bob Dubina (Monmouth)
- Liz Flooks (Niagara)
- Rayven Johnson (NJIT)

Legend

- (C) Team captain
- (S) Suspended
- (I) Ineligible
- (W) Walk-on
- Injured
- Current redshirt

Roster
Last update: September 26, 2024

== Schedule ==
Date time, TV	Rank^{#}	Opponent^{#}	Result	Record	Site (attendance) city, state
Non-conference regular season
November 10, 2017*; 7:00 p.m.		at South Dakota State	L 48–92	0–1	Frost Arena (2,169); Brookings, SD
November 10, 2017*; 2:00 p.m., ESPN3		at North Dakota State	L 58–105	0–2	Scheels Arena (327); Fargo, ND
November 16, 2017*; 7:00 p.m., ESPN3		Fairleigh Dickinson	L 70–74	0–3	Wellness and Events Center (536); Newark, NJ
November 19, 2017*; 7:00 p.m., ESPN3		Saint Peter's	L 52–59	0–3	Wellness and Events Center (407); Newark, NJ
November 22, 2017*; 5:00 p.m.		at Army	L 49–79	0–4	Christl Arena (428); West Point, NY
November 26, 2017*; 2:00 p.m.		at Dartmouth	L 50–81	0–5	Leede Arena (585); Hanover, NH
November 29, 2017*; 7:00 p.m., ESPN3		LIU Brooklyn	L 49–67	0–6	Wellness and Events Center (239); Newark, NJ
December 2, 2017*; 2:30 p.m.		at Morgan State	L 43–55	0–7	Talmadge L. Hill Field House (239); Baltimore, MD
December 6, 2017*; 11:00 a.m.		at Lehigh	L 50–64	0–8	Stabler Arena (4,009); Bethlehem, PA
December 10, 2017*; 2:00 p.m., ESPN3		at Binghamton	L 36–67	0–9	Binghamton University Events Center (1,170); Vestal, NY
December 11, 2017*; 7:00 p.m., ESPN3		St. Joseph's–Brooklyn	W 106–42	1–9	Wellness and Events Center (103); Newark, NJ
December 16, 2017*; 1:00 p.m., ESPN3		Rider	L 64–79	1–10	Wellness and Events Center (175); Newark, NJ
December 28, 2017*; 5:00 p.m., ESPN3		Long Beach State; NJIT Highlanders Christmas Tournament semifinals	W 73–57	2–10	Wellness and Events Center (308); Newark, NJ
December 29, 2017*; 5:00 p.m., ESPN3		Penn; NJIT Highlanders Christmas Tournament championship	L 38–77	2–11	Wellness and Events Center (400); Newark, NJ
January 3, 2018*; 11:00 a.m., ESPN3		Cornell	L 46–61	2–12	Wellness and Events Center (1,457); Newark, NJ
Atlantic Sun regular season
January 6, 2018; 1:00 p.m., ESPN3		USC Upstate	L 57–95	2–13 (0–1)	Wellness and Events Center (199); Newark, NJ
January 13, 2018; 4:00 p.m., ESPN3		at Florida Gulf Coast	L 66–90	2–14 (0–2)	Alico Arena (2,068); Fort Myers, FL
January 15, 2018; 1:00 p.m., ESPN3		at Stetson	L 55–73	2–15 (0–3)	Edmunds Center (357); DeLand, FL
January 20, 2018; 1:00 p.m., ESPN3		Jacksonville	L 58–88	2–16 (0–4)	Wellness and Events Center (28); Newark, NJ
January 22, 2018; 7:00 p.m., ESPN3		North Florida	W 75–65	3–16 (1–4)	Wellness and Events Center (259); Newark, NJ
January 27, 2018; 1:00 p.m., ESPN3		Lipscomb	L 58–74	3–17 (1–5)	Wellness and Events Center (367); Newark, NJ
February 1, 2018; 11:00 a.m., ESPN3		at Kennesaw State	L 65–80	3–18 (1–5)	KSU Convocation Center (367); Kennesaw, GA
February 3, 2018; 1:00 p.m., ESPN3		at Lipscomb	L 58–66	3–19 (1–7)	Allen Arena (273); Nashville, TN
February 7, 2018; 7:00 p.m., ESPN3		Kennesaw State	L 58–61	3–20 (1–8)	Wellness and Events Center (289); Newark, NJ
February 10, 2018; 1:00 p.m., ESPN3		Stetson	L 53–72	3–22 (1–9)	Wellness and Events Center; Newark, NJ
February 12, 2018; 7:00 p.m., ESPN3		Florida Gulf Coast	L 43–80	3–23 (1–10)	Wellness and Events Center (289); Newark, NJ
February 17, 2018; 2:00 p.m., ESPN3		at North Florida	W 66–62	4–23 (2–10)	UNF Arena (314); Jacksonville, FL
February 19, 2018; 7:00 p.m., ESPN3		at Jacksonville	L 53–73	4–24 (2–11)	Swisher Gymnasium (433); Jacksonville, FL
February 24, 2018; 1:00 p.m., ESPN3		at USC Upstate	L 67–74	4–25 (2–12)	G. B. Hodge Center (237); Spartanburg, SC
Atlantic Sun women's tournament
March 2, 2018; 7:00 p.m., ESPN3	(8)	at (1) Florida Gulf Coast; Quarterfinals	L 62–83	4–26	Alico Arena (2,006); Fort Myers, FL
*Non-conference game. ^{#}Rankings from AP poll. (#) Tournament seedings in parentheses. All times are in Eastern.

== See also ==
- 2017–18 NJIT Highlanders men's basketball team
