= 2018 ASUN women's basketball tournament =

- Classification: Division I
- Season: 2017–18
- Teams: 8
- Site: Campus sites
- Champions: Florida Gulf Coast (5th title)
- Winning coach: Karl Smesko (5th title)
- MVP: China Dow (Florida Gulf Coast)
- Attendance: 9,221
- Television: ESPN3

2017–18 ASUN women's basketball standings
	Conf.				Overall
Team	W		L	PCT	W		L	PCT
Florida Gulf Coast †	13	–	1	.929	31	–	5	.861
Jacksonville	12	–	2	.857	24	–	9	.727
Stetson	8	–	6	.571	17	–	15	.531
Lipscomb	7	–	7	.500	12	–	19	.387
USC Upstate	6	–	8	.429	11	–	19	.367
North Florida	5	–	9	.357	13	–	18	.419
Kennesaw State	3	–	11	.214	7	–	19	.269
NJIT	2	–	12	.143	4	–	26	.133
† 2018 ASUN Tournament winner As of 19 March 2018; Rankings from AP poll

The 2018 ASUN women's basketball tournament was the 32nd edition of the ASUN Conference championship. It took place March 2, 7 and 11, 2018 in several arenas at campus sites.

== Format ==
The ASUN Championship is a three-day single-elimination tournament. Eight teams competed in the championship, with the higher seeded team in each matchup hosting the game.

== Seeds ==
Seed	School	Conference	Overall	Tiebreaker
1	Florida Gulf Coast	13–1	27–4	
2	Jacksonville	12–2	22–7	
3	Stetson	8–6	17–13	
4	Lipscomb	7–7	11–18	
5	USC Upstate	6–8	11–18	
6	North Florida	5–9	12–17	
7	Kennesaw State	3–11	7–18	
8	NJIT	2–12	4–25	
Overall records are as of the end of the regular season.

== Schedule ==
Game	Matchup^{#}	Time*	Television	Attendance
Quarterfinals – Friday, March 2
1	No. 8 NJIT at No. 1 Florida Gulf Coast	7:00 PM	ESPN3	2,006
2	No. 5 USC Upstate at No. 4 Lipscomb	8:00 PM	ESPN3	401
3	No. 6 North Florida at No. 3 Stetson	7:00 PM	ESPN3	437
4	No. 7 Kennesaw State at No. 2 Jacksonville	7:00 PM	ESPN3	379
Semifinals – Wednesday, March 7
5	#4 Lipscomb at #1 Florida Gulf Coast	7:00 PM	ESPN3	2,022
6	#6 North Florida at #2 Jacksonville	7:00 PM	ESPN3	1,010
Championship – Sunday, March 11
7	#2 Jacksonville at #1 Florida Gulf Coast	3:00 PM	ESPN3	2,966
*Game times in ET. #-Rankings denote tournament seeding. All games hosted by higher-seeded team.

== Bracket ==
Quarterfinals; March 2 ESPN3
1	Florida Gulf Coast	83
8	NJIT	62
4	Lipscomb	95
5	USC Upstate	53
3	Stetson	55
6	North Florida	63
2	Jacksonville	79
7	Kennesaw State	52

Semifinals; March 7 ESPN3
1	Florida Gulf Coast	105
4	Lipscomb	55
6	North Florida	77
2	Jacksonville	83

Championship; March 11; ESPN3
1	Florida Gulf Coast	68
2	Jacksonville	58

== See also ==
- 2018 Atlantic Sun men's basketball tournament
