= 2017–18 Florida Gulf Coast Eagles women's basketball team =

Intercollegiate basketball season

2017–18 Florida Gulf Coast Eagles women's basketball
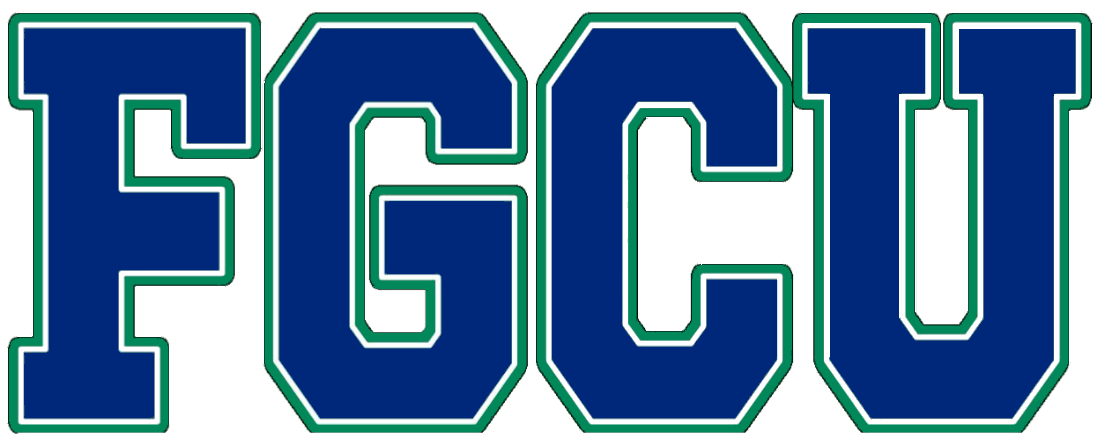

Atlantic Sun Regular Season and Tournament Champions

NCAA Women's Tournament, second round
- Conference: Atlantic Sun Conference

Ranking
- Coaches: No. 25
- Record: 31–5 (12–1 A-Sun)
- Head coach: Karl Smesko (16th season)
- Assistant coaches: Chelsea Banbury; Chelsea Lyles; Jenna Cobb
- Home arena: Alico Arena

2017–18 ASUN women's basketball standings
	Conf.				Overall
Team	W		L	PCT	W		L	PCT
Florida Gulf Coast †	13	–	1	.929	31	–	5	.861
Jacksonville	12	–	2	.857	24	–	9	.727
Stetson	8	–	6	.571	17	–	15	.531
Lipscomb	7	–	7	.500	12	–	19	.387
USC Upstate	6	–	8	.429	11	–	19	.367
North Florida	5	–	9	.357	13	–	18	.419
Kennesaw State	3	–	11	.214	7	–	19	.269
NJIT	2	–	12	.143	4	–	26	.133
† 2018 ASUN Tournament winner As of 19 March 2018; Rankings from AP poll

The 2017–18 Florida Gulf Coast Eagles women's basketball team represented Florida Gulf Coast University (FGCU) in the 2017–18 NCAA Division I women's basketball season. The Eagles, led by sixteenth year head coach Karl Smesko, played their home games at Alico Arena and were members of the Atlantic Sun Conference. They finished the season 31–5, 12–1 in A-Sun play to win the Atlantic Sun regular season champions. They also won the ASUN Tournament and received an automatic bid to the NCAA women's tournament, where they upset Missouri in the first round before losing to Stanford in the second round.

== Media ==
All home games and conference road are shown on ESPN3 or A-Sun.TV. Road games are also broadcast on the FGCU Portal.

== Roster ==
2017–18 Florida Gulf Coast Eagles women's basketball team
Players
Coaches

Pos.	#	Name	Height	Year	Previous school	Hometown
G	0	Davion Wingate (redshirt)	5 ft 6 in (1.68 m)	Jr	Stephenson HS; Stony Brook	Atlanta, GA
G	1	Jessica Cattani (W)	5 ft 7 in (1.7 m)	RS Sr	Muskego HS	Muskego, WI
G	2	Alyssa Blair	5 ft 11 in (1.8 m)	Fr	Sun Prairie	Sun Prairie, WI
G	3	Keri Jewett-Giles (redshirt)	5 ft 6 in (1.68 m)	Jr	Dunbar HS; Southern Miss	Fort Myers, FL
G	4	Chandler Ryan	5 ft 7 in (1.7 m)	RS Fr	Morton HS	Groveland, IL
G	5	Lisa Zderadicka	5 ft 6 in (1.68 m)	RS Jr	HAK Korneuburg; Houston Baptist	Vienna, Austria
G	10	Sheahen Dowling	5 ft 7 in (1.7 m)	Fr	Trinity	Chicago, IL
G	11	Erica Nelson	5 ft 8 in (1.73 m)	RS Sr	Lee Summit North HS; Johnson County CC	Columbus, IN
F	12	Samantha Kisiel	5 ft 11 in (1.8 m)	So	Evergreen	Evergreen, CO
G	13	Kerstie Phills (redshirt)	5 ft 9 in (1.75 m)	So	Charlotte Christian HS; Wagner	Charlotte, NC
G/F	21	Liberty Brown	6 ft 0 in (1.83 m)	Fr	Dallas Bryan Adams HS	Forney, TX
G	22	China Dow	5 ft 8 in (1.73 m)	RS Sr	Christian Academy of Louisville; Middle Tennessee	Louisville, KY
G	24	Taylor Gradinjan	5 ft 9 in (1.75 m)	RS Sr	Cudahy HS	Cudahy, WI
F	31	Nasrin Ulel	5 ft 9 in (1.75 m)	So	Murrieta Valley HS	Murrieta, CA
F	32	Rosemarie Julien	5 ft 11 in (1.8 m)	Sr	Treasure Coast HS; Chipola College	Port St. Lucie, FL
G	42	Tytionia Adderly	5 ft 10 in (1.78 m)	So	Cardinal Newman	Jupiter, FL

Head coach

- Karl Smesko (Kent State)

Assistant coach(es)

- Chelsea Banbury (Florida Gulf Coast)
- Chelsea Lyles (Florida Gulf Coast)
- Jenna Cobb (Florida Gulf Coast)

Legend

- (C) Team captain
- (S) Suspended
- (I) Ineligible
- (W) Walk-on
- Injured
- Current redshirt

Roster
Last update: December 15, 2017

== Schedule ==
Date time, TV	Rank^{#}	Opponent^{#}	Result	Record	Site (attendance) city, state
Non-conference regular season
11/12/2017*; 2:00 pm, ESPN3		Illinois	W 85–61	1–0	Alico Arena (2,202); Fort Myers, FL
11/15/2017*; 7:00 pm		at FIU	W 88–52	2–0	FIU Arena (360); Miami, FL
11/17/2017*; 5:00 pm		vs. Kent State; Akron Classic	W 80–62	3–0	James A. Rhodes Arena; Akron, OH
11/18/2017*; 2:30 pm		at Akron; Akron Classic	W 82–63	4–0	James A. Rhodes Arena (611); Akron, OH
11/20/2017*; 7:00 pm		at Siena	W 63–50	5–0	Alumni Recreation Center (573); Loudonville, NY
11/23/2017*; 3:30 pm		vs. DePaul; Play4Kay Shootout quarterfinals	W 89–84 ^{OT}	6–0	Mandalay Bay Arena; Paradise, NV
11/24/2017*; 8:30 pm		vs. No. 9 Ohio State; Play4Kay Shootout semifinals	L 62–104	6–1	Mandalay Bay Arena; Paradise, NV
11/25/2017*; 8:30 pm		vs. Belmont; Play4Kay Shootout 3rd place game	L 65–75	6–2	Mandalay Bay Arena; Paradise, NV
12/03/2017*; 3:00 pm		at Abilene Christian	W 94–55	7–2	Moody Coliseum (1,103); Abilene, TX
12/05/2017*; 4:30 pm, ESPN3		Southeastern	W 76–66	8–2	Alico Arena (1,576); Fort Myers, FL
12/08/2017*; 7:00 pm, ESPN3		No. 20 Kentucky	W 70–64	9–2	Alico Arena (2,343); Fort Myers, FL
12/10/2017*; 2:00 pm, ESPN3		Ave Maria	W 99–35	10–2	Alico Arena; Fort Myers, FL
12/17/2017*; 1:00 pm, ESPN3		at Chattanooga	L 61–68	10–3	McKenzie Arena (1,457); Chattanooga, TN
12/20/2017*; 7:00 pm, ESPN3		Harvard; FGCU Hilton Inn Garden Classic	W 65–56	11–3	Alico Arena (2,297); Fort Myers, FL
12/21/2017*; 7:00 pm, ESPN3		SIU Edwardsville; FGCU Hilton Inn Garden Classic	W 66–49	12–3	Alico Arena (1,845); Fort Myers, FL
12/29/2017*; 7:30 pm, ESPN3		South Dakota State	W 87–78	13–3	Alico Arena (2,234); Fort Myers, FL
12/30/2017*; 7:00 pm, ESPN3		Florida Memorial	W 82–43	14–3	Alico Arena (1,589); Fort Myers, FL
Atlantic Sun regular season
01/06/2018; 4:00 pm, ESPN3		Stetson	W 80–40	15–3 (1–0)	Alico Arena (2,407); Fort Myers, FL
01/13/2018; 4:00 pm, ESPN3		NJIT	W 90–66	16–3 (2–0)	Alico Arena (2,068); Fort Myers, FL
01/15/2018; 7:00 pm, ESPN3		USC Upstate	W 93–60	17–3 (3–0)	Alico Arena (2,347); Fort Myers, FL
01/20/2018; 2:00 pm, ESPN3		at Kennesaw State	W 78–57	18–3 (4–0)	KSU Convocation Center (961); Kennesaw, GA
01/22/2018; 7:30 pm, ESPN3		at Lipscomb	W 68–54	19–3 (5–0)	Allen Arena (503); Nashville, TN
01/27/2018; 4:00 pm, ESPN3		Jacksonville	W 63–58	20–3 (6–0)	Alico Arena (2,814); Fort Myers, FL
02/01/2018; 7:00 pm, ESPN3		at North Florida	L 73–75	20–4 (6–1)	UNF Arena (341); Jacksonville, FL
02/03/2018; 1:00 pm, ESPN3		at Jacksonville	W 65–63	21–4 (7–1)	Swisher Gymnasium (601); Jacksonville, FL
02/06/2018; 7:00 pm, ESPN3		North Florida	W 67–62	22–4 (8–1)	Alico Arena (2,413); Fort Myers, FL
02/10/2018; 1:30 pm, ESPN3		at USC Upstate	W 88–44	23–4 (9–1)	G. B. Hodge Center (315); Spartanburg, SC
02/12/2018; 7:00 pm, ESPN3		at NJIT	W 89–43	24–4 (10–1)	Wellness and Events Center (289); Newark, NJ
02/17/2018; 4:00 pm, ESPN3		Lipscomb	W 88–52	25–4 (11–1)	Alico Arena (2,620); Fort Myers, FL
02/19/2018; 7:00 pm, ESPN3		Kennesaw State	W 78–51	26–4 (12–1)	Alico Arena (2,604); Fort Myers, FL
02/24/2018; 1:00 pm, ESPN3		at Stetson	W 74–60	27–4 (13–1)	Edmunds Center (446); Lakeland, FL
Atlantic Sun Women's Tournament
03/02/2018; 7:00 pm, ESPN3	(1)	(8) NJIT; Quarterfinals	W 83–62	28–4	Alico Arena (2,006); Fort Myers, FL
03/07/2018; 7:00 pm, ESPN3	(1)	(4) Lipscomb; Semifinals	W 105–55	29–4	Alico Arena (2,022); Fort Myers, FL
03/11/2018; 7:00 pm, ESPN3	(1)	(2) Jacksonville; Championship Game	W 68–58	30–4	Alico Arena (2,966); Fort Myers, FL
NCAA Women's Tournament
03/17/2018*; 3:30 pm, ESPN2	(12 L)	vs. (5 L) No. 17 Missouri; First Round	W 80–70	31–4	Maples Pavilion; Stanford, CA
03/19/2018*; 9:00 pm, ESPN2	(12 L)	at (4 L) No. 15 Stanford; Second Round	L 70–90	31–5	Maples Pavilion (2,049); Stanford, CA
*Non-conference game. ^{#}Rankings from AP Poll. (#) Tournament seedings in parentheses. L=Lexington Region. All times are in Eastern Time.

== Rankings ==
2017–18 NCAA Division I women's basketball rankings

Regular season polls
Poll	Pre- Season	Week 2	Week 3	Week 4	Week 5	Week 6	Week 7	Week 8	Week 9	Week 10	Week 11	Week 12	Week 13	Week 14	Week 15	Week 16	Week 17	Week 18	Week 19	Final
AP	NR	NR	NR	NR	NR	RV	NR	NR	NR	NR	NR	RV	RV	NR	NR	RV	RV	RV	RV	N/A
Coaches	RV	N/A	RV	RV	NR	RV	NR	NR	NR	RV	RV	RV	25	RV	RV	RV	RV	RV	RV	25

Legend
	Increase in ranking
	Decrease in ranking
	No change
(RV)	Received votes
(NR)	Not ranked

== See also ==
- 2017–18 Florida Gulf Coast Eagles men's basketball team
