= 2017–18 Lipscomb Bisons women's basketball team =

Intercollegiate basketball season

2017–18 Lipscomb Bisons women's basketball
- Conference: Atlantic Sun Conference
- Record: 12–19 (7–7 A-Sun)
- Head coach: Greg Brown (6th season)
- Assistant coaches: Hannah Phillips; Aaron Holland; Clay Crothers
- Home arena: Allen Arena

2017–18 ASUN women's basketball standings
	Conf.				Overall
Team	W		L	PCT	W		L	PCT
Florida Gulf Coast †	13	–	1	.929	31	–	5	.861
Jacksonville	12	–	2	.857	24	–	9	.727
Stetson	8	–	6	.571	17	–	15	.531
Lipscomb	7	–	7	.500	12	–	19	.387
USC Upstate	6	–	8	.429	11	–	19	.367
North Florida	5	–	9	.357	13	–	18	.419
Kennesaw State	3	–	11	.214	7	–	19	.269
NJIT	2	–	12	.143	4	–	26	.133
† 2018 ASUN Tournament winner As of 19 March 2018; Rankings from AP poll

The 2017–18 Lipscomb Bisons women's basketball team represented Lipscomb University in the 2017–18 NCAA Division I women's basketball season. The Bisons, led by sixth year head coach Greg Brown, played their home games at Allen Arena and were members of the Atlantic Sun Conference. They finished the season 12–19, 7–7 in A-Sun play to finish in fourth place. They advanced to the semifinals of A-Sun Tournament, where they lost to Florida Gulf Coast.

== Media ==
All home games and conference road are shown on ESPN3 or A-Sun. TV. Non conference road games are typically available on the opponents website.

== Roster ==
2017–18 Lipscomb Bisons women's basketball team
Players
Coaches

Pos.	#	Name	Height	Year	Previous school	Hometown
F	0	Loshaveon Jones	5 ft 10 in (1.78 m)	Sr	Daytona State	Rockledge, FL
G	2	Kennedy Potts	5 ft 10 in (1.78 m)	Sr	Harpeth Hall School	Nashville, TN
G	3	Meredith Lovelady	5 ft 9 in (1.75 m)	Sr	Shelton State	Madison, WI
F	4	Emily Kmec	6 ft 2 in (1.88 m)	RS Fr	Carmel	Carmel, IN
G	5	Carleigh Short	5 ft 6 in (1.68 m)	So	Hendersonville	Hendersonville, TN
G	12	Auriana Broughton	5 ft 10 in (1.78 m)	Sr	Georgia Highlands College	Lithonia, GA
G	14	Lexi Manos	5 ft 5 in (1.65 m)	So	Hoover	North Canton, OH
G	15	Lauren Rau	5 ft 5 in (1.65 m)	So	Center Grove	Greenwood, IN
G	20	Taylor Clark	5 ft 9 in (1.75 m)	Fr	Lawrence County	Lawrenceburg, TN
G	21	Kaylee Cotton	5 ft 10 in (1.78 m)	So	McCreary Central	Stearns, KY
G	22	Loren Cagle	5 ft 5 in (1.65 m)	RS Sr	Lipscomb Academy	Nashville, TN
G	23	Anna Hammaker	5 ft 10 in (1.78 m)	RS So	Kansas State	Knoxville, TN
F	24	Morgan Turner	6 ft 2 in (1.88 m)	Jr	Meade County	Guston, KY
F	32	Laure Assena	6 ft 0 in (1.83 m)	Sr	Arizona Western College	Yaoundé, Cameroon
F	42	Riley Northway	6 ft 2 in (1.88 m)	Sr	Brewer	Somerville, AL

Head coach

- Greg Brown (Lipscomb)

Assistant coach(es)

- Hannah Phillips (Lipscomb)
- Aaron Holland (Arkansas State)
- Clay Crothers (Lipscomb)

Legend

- (C) Team captain
- (S) Suspended
- (I) Ineligible
- (W) Walk-on
- Injured
- Current redshirt

Roster
Last update: December 16, 2017

== Schedule ==
Date time, TV	Rank^{#}	Opponent^{#}	Result	Record	Site (attendance) city, state
Non-conference regular season
11/10/2017*; 11:00 am		at College of Charleston	L 69–85	0–1	TD Arena (304); Charleston, SC
11/12/2017*; 1:00 pm		at Charleston Southern	W 58–54	1–1	CSU Field House (212); Charleston, SC
11/15/2017*; 6:00 pm, ESPN3		at Ball State	L 46–84	1–2	Worthen Arena (1,076); Muncie, IN
11/17/2017*; 6:00 pm		at Butler	L 58–70	1–3	Hinkle Fieldhouse (506); Indianapolis, IN
11/19/2017*; 2:00 pm		at Middle Tennessee	L 48–72	1–4	Murphy Center (4,122); Murfreesboro, TN
11/21/2017*; 6:30 pm, ESPN3		Murray State	W 65–64	2–4	Allen Arena (165); Nashville, TN
11/26/2017*; 3:00 pm, ESPN3		Austin Peay	L 63–71	2–5	Allen Arena (210); Nashville, TN
12/02/2017*; 4:00 pm, ESPN3		Morehead State	L 55–75	2–6	Allen Arena (150); Nashville, TN
12/04/2017*; 5:00 pm, ESPN3		Belmont; Battle of the Boulevard	L 59–91	2–7	Allen Arena (475); Nashville, TN
12/07/2017*; 6:30 pm, ESPN3		Alabama	L 51–73	2–8	Allen Arena (216); Nashville, TN
12/15/2017*; 6:00 pm		at Tennessee State	L 64–71	2–9	Gentry Center (325); Nashville, TN
12/17/2017*; 2:00 pm		at Saint Louis	L 57–101	2–10	Chaifetz Arena (622); St. Louis, MO
12/21/2017*; 6:00 pm		at Tennessee Tech	W 61–57	3–10	Eblen Center (808); Cookeville, TN
12/28/2017*; 6:00 pm		at Vanderbilt	L 82–92	3–11	Memorial Gymnasium (2,230); Nashville, TN
12/29/2017*; 6:30 pm, ESPN3		Alabama A&M	W 66–50	4–11	Allen Arena; Nashville, TN
Atlantic Sun regular season
01/06/2018; 1:00 pm, ESPN3		at Kennesaw State	W 64–62	5–11 (1–0)	KSU Convocation Center (978); Kennesaw, GA
01/13/2018; 12:00 pm, ESPN3		at Jacksonville	L 48–70	5–12 (1–1)	Swisher Gymnasium (416); Jacksonville, FL
01/15/2018; 6:00 pm, ESPN3		at North Florida	W 73–69	6–12 (2–1)	UNF Arena (286); Jacksonville, FL
01/20/2018; 1:30 pm, ESPN3		Stetson	L 55–59	6–13 (2–2)	Allen Arena (286); Nashville, TN
01/22/2018; 6:30 pm, ESPN3		Florida Gulf Coast	L 54–68	6–14 (2–3)	Allen Arena (503); Nashville, TN
01/27/2018; 12:00 pm, ESPN3		at NJIT	W 74–58	6–15 (2–4)	Wellness and Events Center (367); Newark, NJ
02/01/2018; 6:30 pm, ESPN3		USC Upstate	W 97–78	7–15 (3–4)	Allen Arena (367); Nashville, TN
02/03/2018; 12:00 pm, ESPN3		NJIT	W 66–58	8–15 (4–4)	Allen Arena (273); Nashville, TN
02/07/2018; 6:00 pm, ESPN3		at USC Upstate	L 64–80	8–16 (5–4)	G. B. Hodge Center (438); Spartanburg, SC
02/10/2018; 1:30 pm, ESPN3		North Florida	W 78–57	9–16 (6–4)	Allen Arena (317); Nashville, TN
02/12/2018; 6:30 pm, ESPN3		Jacksonville	L 63–70	10–16 (6–5)	Allen Arena (176); Nashville, TN
02/27/2018; 3:00 pm, ESPN3		at Florida Gulf Coast	L 54–68	10–17 (6–6)	Alico Arena (2,620); Fort Myers, FL
02/19/2018; 6:00 pm, ESPN3		at Stetson	L 71–91	10–18 (6–7)	Edmunds Center (708); DeLand, FL
02/24/2018; 4:00 pm, ESPN3		Kennesaw State	W 69–52	11–18 (7–7)	Allen Arena (205); Nashville, TN
Atlantic Sun Women's Tournament
03/02/2018; 7:00 pm, ESPN3	(4)	(5) USC Upstate; Quarterfinals	W 95–53	12–18	Allen Arena (401); Nashville, TN
03/02/2018; 7:00 pm, ESPN3	(4)	at (1) Florida Gulf Coast; Semifinals	L 55–105	12–19	Alico Arena (2,022); Fort Myers, FL
*Non-conference game. ^{#}Rankings from AP Poll. (#) Tournament seedings in parentheses. All times are in Central Time.

== See also ==
- 2017–18 Lipscomb Bisons men's basketball team
