= 2017–18 Jacksonville Dolphins women's basketball team =

Intercollegiate basketball season

2017–18 Jacksonville Dolphins women's basketball
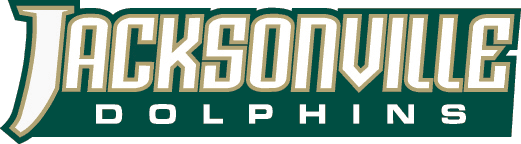

WNIT, First Round
- Conference: Atlantic Sun Conference
- Record: 24–9 (12–2 A-Sun)
- Head coach: Yolett McPhee-McCuin (5th season)
- Assistant coaches: Darnell Haney; LaQuanda Dawkins; Stephanie Edwards
- Home arena: Swisher Gymnasium

2017–18 ASUN women's basketball standings
	Conf.				Overall
Team	W		L	PCT	W		L	PCT
Florida Gulf Coast †	13	–	1	.929	31	–	5	.861
Jacksonville	12	–	2	.857	24	–	9	.727
Stetson	8	–	6	.571	17	–	15	.531
Lipscomb	7	–	7	.500	12	–	19	.387
USC Upstate	6	–	8	.429	11	–	19	.367
North Florida	5	–	9	.357	13	–	18	.419
Kennesaw State	3	–	11	.214	7	–	19	.269
NJIT	2	–	12	.143	4	–	26	.133
† 2018 ASUN Tournament winner As of 19 March 2018; Rankings from AP poll

The 2017–18 Jacksonville Dolphins women's basketball team represented Jacksonville University in the 2017–18 NCAA Division I women's basketball season. The Dolphins, led by fifth year head coach Yolett McPhee-McCuin, played their home games at Swisher Gymnasium and were members of the Atlantic Sun Conference. They finished the season 24–9, 12–2 in A-Sun play to finish in second place. They advanced to the championship of the 2018 Atlantic Sun women's basketball tournament, where they lost to Florida Gulf Coast. They received an automatic bid to the WNIT, where they lost to UCF in the first round.

On April 5, Yolett McPhee-McCuin left Jacksonville to be a head coach at Ole Miss. She finished at Jacksonville with a 5-year record of 94–63.

== Media ==
All home games and conference road games are shown on ESPN3 or A-Sun.TV.

== Roster ==
2017–18 Jacksonville Dolphins women's basketball team
Players
Coaches

Pos.	#	Name	Height	Year	Previous school	Hometown
F	1	Trudy Walker	5 ft 11 in (1.8 m)	Jr	Fort Pierce Westwood; Eastern Florida State	Port St. Lucie, FL
G	3	Rolanda Hayes	5 ft 7 in (1.7 m)	RS Jr	Viera; Florida Atlantic	Rockledge, FL
G	4	Brandi Buie	5 ft 8 in (1.73 m)	Sr	Randolph-Clay	Tampa, FL
G	5	Naqaiyyah Teague	5 ft 7 in (1.7 m)	Sr	Malcolm X. Shabazz; UNC Wilmington	Newark, NJ
G	11	Kayla Nevitt	5 ft 10 in (1.78 m)	RS Jr	Andy Dekaney HS; Mississippi State	Houston, TX
G	14	Alexis Pierce	5 ft 9 in (1.75 m)	Fr	Sol C. Johnson	Savannah, GA
F	15	Kayla Gordon	6 ft 0 in (1.83 m)	Sr	Meridian	Meridian, MS
C	20	Shalonda Neely	6 ft 0 in (1.83 m)	RS So	Arlington Country Day	Freeport, Grand Bahama
G	21	Lindsay John	5 ft 11 in (1.8 m)	Jr	Lycée Victor Hugo; Tallahassee CC	Cholet, France
G	22	Alexis Burns	5 ft 8 in (1.73 m)	So	Carver	Columbus, GA
F/C	23	Khadijah Brown	6 ft 4 in (1.93 m)	So	South Miami	Miami, FL
G	24	Jasmyn Brown	5 ft 10 in (1.78 m)	Jr	Haines City	Haines City, FL
F/C	32	Amber Bender	6 ft 2 in (1.88 m)	So	Calvary Christian Academy	Fort Lauderdale, FL
F	44	LaKaris Salter	6 ft 1 in (1.85 m)	RS Jr	FAMU DRS; Mississippi State	Tallahassee, FL

Head coach

- Yolett McPhee-McCuin (Rhode Island)

Assistant coach(es)

- Darnell Haney (Florida A&M)
- LaQuanda Dawkins (North Carolina)
- Stephanie Edwards (Jacksonville)

Legend

- (C) Team captain
- (S) Suspended
- (I) Ineligible
- (W) Walk-on
- Injured
- Current redshirt

Roster
Last update: December 15, 2017

== Schedule ==
Date time, TV	Rank^{#}	Opponent^{#}	Result	Record	Site (attendance) city, state
Non-conference regular season
11/10/2017*; 5:00 pm, ACCN Extra		at NC State	L 44–64	0–1	Reynolds Coliseum (1,757); Raleigh, NC
11/13/2017*; 7:00 pm, ESPN3		Iona	W 71–62	1–1	Swisher Gymnasium (567); Jacksonville, FL
11/16/2017*; 12:30 pm		at Alabama	L 60–75	1–2	Coleman Coliseum (4,179); Tuscaloosa, AL
11/18/2017*; 2:00 pm		at Nicholls State	W 69–61	2–2	Stopher Gym (301); Thibodaux, LA
11/24/2017*; 2:30 pm, ESPN3		Monmouth; Fairfield Inn Thanksgiving Tournament	W 74–65	3–2	Swisher Gymnasium (413); Jacksonville, FL
11/25/2017*; 2:30 pm, ESPN3		Webber International; Fairfield Inn Thanksgiving Tournament	W 64–43	4–2	Swisher Gymnasium (544); Jacksonville, FL
11/28/2017*; 7:00 pm		at Florida	L 59–69	4–3	O'Connell Center (1,009); Gainesville, FL
12/01/2017*; 7:00 pm, ESPN3		at Troy	L 88–89	4–4	Trojan Arena (512); Troy, AL
12/03/2017*; 2:00 pm		at South Alabama	W 60–58	5–4	Mitchell Center (178); Mobile, AL
12/10/2017*; 2:00 pm, ESPN3		Flagler	W 79–52	6–4	Swisher Gymnasium (501); Jacksonville, FL
12/17/2017*; 3:00 pm		at Bethune–Cookman	W 68–58	7–4	Moore Gymnasium (291); Daytona Beach, FL
12/19/2017*; 12:00 pm		vs. Edward Waters; UNF Holiday Classic	W 79–58	8–4	UNF Arena (147); Jacksonville, FL
12/20/2017*; 12:00 pm		vs. Northern Kentucky; UNF Holiday Classic	W 61–49	9–4	UNF Arena (112); Jacksonville, FL
12/28/2017*; 7:00 pm, ACCN Extra		at No. 13 Florida State	L 50–82	9–5	Donald L. Tucker Center (2,900); Tallahassee, FL
12/31/2017*; 2:00 pm, ESPN3		Savannah State	W 74–46	10–5	Swisher Gymnasium (392); Jacksonville, FL
Atlantic Sun regular season
01/06/2018; 2:00 pm, ESPN3		at North Florida	W 66–48	11–5 (1–0)	UNF Arena (362); Jacksonville, FL
01/13/2018; 1:00 pm, ESPN3		Lipscomb	W 70–48	12–5 (2–0)	Swisher Gymnasium (416); Jacksonville, FL
01/15/2018; 1:00 pm, ESPN3		Kennesaw State	W 84–49	13–5 (3–0)	Swisher Gymnasium (423); Jacksonville, FL
01/20/2018; 1:00 pm, ESPN3		at NJIT	W 88–58	14–5 (4–0)	Wellness and Events Center (28); Newark, NJ
01/22/2018; 7:00 pm, ESPN3		at USC Upstate	W 71–45	15–5 (5–0)	G. B. Hodge Center (231); Spartanburg, SC
01/27/2018; 4:00 pm, ESPN3		at Florida Gulf Coast	L 58–63	15–6 (5–1)	Alico Arena (2,814); Fort Myers, FL
02/01/2018; 7:00 pm, ESPN3		Stetson	W 73–63	16–6 (6–1)	Swisher Gymnasium (599); Jacksonville, FL
02/03/2018; 1:00 pm, ESPN3		Florida Gulf Coast	L 63–65	16–7 (6–2)	Swisher Gymnasium (601); Jacksonville, FL
02/07/2018; 7:00 pm, ESPN3		at Stetson	W 61–54	17–7 (7–2)	Edmunds Center (374); Lakeland, FL
02/10/2018; 2:00 pm, ESPN3		at Kennesaw State	W 67–49	18–7 (8–2)	KSU Convocation Center (652); Kennesaw, GA
02/12/2018; 7:30 pm, ESPN3		at Lipscomb	W 70–63	19–7 (9–2)	Allen Arena (176); Nashville, TN
02/17/2018; 1:00 pm, ESPN3		USC Upstate	W 65–49	20–7 (10–2)	Swisher Gymnasium (489); Jacksonville, FL
02/19/2018; 7:00 pm, ESPN3		NJIT	W 75–53	21–7 (11–2)	Swisher Gymnasium (433); Jacksonville, FL
02/24/2018; 2:00 pm, ESPN3		North Florida	W 64–43	22–7 (12–2)	Swisher Gymnasium (707); Jacksonville, FL
Atlantic Sun Women's Tournament
03/02/2018; 7:00 pm, ESPN3	(2)	(7) Kennesaw State; Quarterfinals	W 79–52	23–7	Swisher Gymnasium (379); Jacksonville, FL
03/07/2018; 7:00 pm, ESPN3	(2)	(6) North Florida; Semifinals	W 83–77 ^{OT}	24–7	Swisher Gymnasium (1,010); Jacksonville, FL
03/11/2018; 3:00 pm, ESPN3	(2)	at (1) Florida Gulf Coast; Championship Game	L 58–68	24–8	Alico Arena (2,966); Fort Myers, FL
WNIT
03/14/2018*; 6:00 pm		at UCF; First Round	L 60–65 ^{OT}	24–9	CFE Arena (493); Orlando, FL
*Non-conference game. ^{#}Rankings from AP Poll. (#) Tournament seedings in parentheses. All times are in Eastern Time.

== Rankings ==
2017–18 NCAA Division I women's basketball rankings

+ Regular season polls	Poll	Pre- Season	Week 2	Week 3	Week 4	Week 5	Week 6	Week 7	Week 8	Week 9	Week 10	Week 11	Week 12	Week 13	Week 14	Week 15	Week 16	Week 17	Week 18	Week 19	Final
AP																				N/A	
Coaches																					

Legend
	Increase in ranking
	Decrease in ranking
	No change
(RV)	Received votes
(NR)	Not ranked

== See also ==
- 2017–18 Jacksonville Dolphins men's basketball team
