= 2017–18 North Florida Ospreys women's basketball team =

Intercollegiate basketball season

2017–18 North Florida Ospreys women's basketball
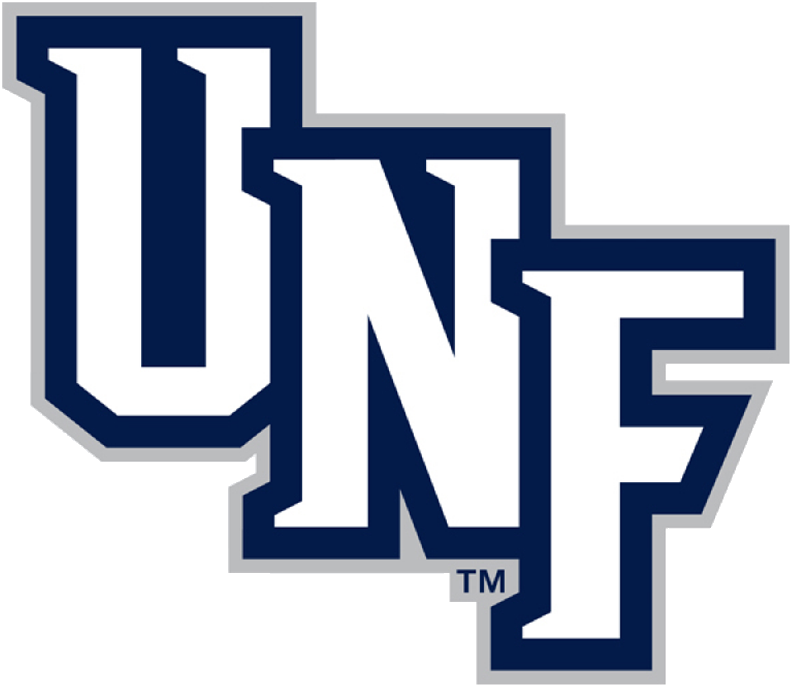
- Conference: Atlantic Sun Conference
- Record: 13–18 (5–9 A-Sun)
- Head coach: Darrick Gibbs (3rd season)
- Assistant coaches: David Lowery; Jessica Taylor; MaryLynne Schaefer
- Home arena: UNF Arena

2017–18 ASUN women's basketball standings
	Conf.				Overall
Team	W		L	PCT	W		L	PCT
Florida Gulf Coast †	13	–	1	.929	31	–	5	.861
Jacksonville	12	–	2	.857	24	–	9	.727
Stetson	8	–	6	.571	17	–	15	.531
Lipscomb	7	–	7	.500	12	–	19	.387
USC Upstate	6	–	8	.429	11	–	19	.367
North Florida	5	–	9	.357	13	–	18	.419
Kennesaw State	3	–	11	.214	7	–	19	.269
NJIT	2	–	12	.143	4	–	26	.133
† 2018 ASUN Tournament winner As of 19 March 2018; Rankings from AP poll

The 2017–18 North Florida Ospreys women's basketball team represented the University of North Florida in the 2017–18 NCAA Division I women's basketball season. The Ospreys, led by third year head coach Darrick Gibbs, played their games at UNF Arena and were members of the Atlantic Sun Conference. They finished the season 13–18, 5–9 in A-Sun play to finish in a tie for sixth place. They advanced to the semifinals of A-Sun Tournament, where they lost to Jacksonville.

== Media ==
All home games and conference road games are shown on ESPN3 or A-Sun.TV.

== Roster ==
2017–18 North Florida Ospreys women's basketball team
Players
Coaches

Pos.	#	Name	Height	Year	Previous school	Hometown
G	1	Arianna Emanuel-Wright	5 ft 8 in (1.73 m)	Jr	Paxon Advanced Studies; Santa Fe	Jacksonville, FL
G	2	Ty Purifoy	5 ft 1 in (1.55 m)	Jr	Pine Forest; Gulf Coast State	Pensacola, FL
G	3	Tiffany Tolbert	5 ft 8 in (1.73 m)	Fr	Dr. Phillips	Orlando, FL
G	4	Adrienne Jackson	5 ft 9 in (1.75 m)	So	Leesburg	Leesburg, FL
G/F	5	Hadley Kiefer	5 ft 11 in (1.8 m)	Jr	Jerome	Dublin, OH
G	11	Ta'Kyla Austin	5 ft 7 in (1.7 m)	Fr	Northeast	Fort Lauderdale, FL
G	12	Tesh Hanson	5 ft 11 in (1.8 m)	RS Sr	Seffner Christian Academy; Liberty	Tampa, FL
G	13	Rhetta Moore	5 ft 8 in (1.73 m)	Fr	Bishop England	Charleston, SC
G	14	Elli Bartley	5 ft 6 in (1.68 m)	Fr	Glasgow	Glasgow, KY
F	22	Keonna Farmer	6 ft 1 in (1.85 m)	RS Sr	Center Point; UAB	Birmingham, AL
G/F	24	Maiya Rumph	5 ft 10 in (1.78 m)	Sr	Sparkman	Madison, AL
F		Jazz Bond (redshirt)	6 ft 4 in (1.93 m)	So	Blackman; South Florida	Murfreesboro, TN

Head coach

- Darrick Gibbs (Wofford)

Assistant coach(es)

- David Lowery (Mississippi State)
- Jessica Taylor (Wofford)
- MaryLynne Schaefer (Hartford)

Legend

- (C) Team captain
- (S) Suspended
- (I) Ineligible
- (W) Walk-on
- Injured
- Current redshirt

Roster
Last update: December 16, 2017

== Schedule ==
Date time, TV	Rank^{#}	Opponent^{#}	Result	Record	Site (attendance) city, state
Non-conference regular season
11/10/2017*; 7:00 pm, ACCN Extra		at No. 18 Florida State	L 51–109	0–1	Donald L. Tucker Center (2,637); Tallahassee, FL
11/13/2017*; 11:00 am, ESPN3		Warner	W 74–38	1–1	UNF Arena (3,201); Jacksonville, FL
11/17/2017*; 6:00 pm		at Morehead State	W 61–56	2–1	Ellis Johnson Arena (585); Morehead, KY
11/19/2017*; 5:00 pm		at No. 12 West Virginia	L 59–87	2–2	WVU Coliseum (1,156); Morgantown, WV
11/24/2017*; 12:00 pm		vs. Webber International; Fairfield Inn Thanksgiving Tournament	W 81–53	3–2	Swisher Gymnasium (213); Jacksonville, FL
11/25/2017*; 12:00 pm		vs. Monmouth; Fairfield Inn Thanksgiving Tournament	L 57–67	3–3	Swisher Gymnasium (212); Jacksonville, FL
11/30/2017*; 7:00 pm, ESPN3		Bethune–Cookman	W 70–63 ^{OT}	4–3	UNF Arena (353); Jacksonville, FL
12/03/2017*; 2:00 pm		at Florida Atlantic	L 75–83 ^{2OT}	4–4	FAU Arena (406); Boca Raton, FL
12/10/2017*; 2:00 pm		at Florida A&M	W 77–68	5–4	Teaching Gym (352); Tallahassee, FL
12/12/2017*; 7:00 pm, BTN		at No. 23 Michigan	L 34–79	5–5	Crisler Center (1,789); Ann Arbor, MI
12/15/2017*; 7:00 pm, ESPN3		College of Charleston	L 69–73	5–6	UNF Arena (304); Jacksonville, FL
12/19/2017*; 2:00 pm, ESPN3		Northern Kentucky; UNF Holiday Classic	W 58–50	6–6	UNF Arena (219); Jacksonville, FL
12/20/2017*; 2:00 pm, ESPN3		Edward Waters; UNF Holiday Classic	W 73–47	7–6	UNF Arena (127); Jacksonville, FL
12/28/2017*; 2:00 pm		at Georgia	L 37–75	7–7	Stegeman Coliseum (2,614); Athens, GA
12/31/2017*; 2:00 pm, ESPN3		at Wofford	L 57–69	7–8	Jerry Richardson Indoor Stadium (168); Spartanburg, SC
Atlantic Sun regular season
01/06/2018; 2:00 pm, ESPN3		Jacksonville	L 48–66	7–9 (0–1)	UNF Arena (362); Jacksonville, FL
01/13/2018; 2:00 pm, ESPN3		Kennesaw State	W 77–72	8–9 (1–1)	UNF Arena (292); Jacksonville, FL
01/15/2018; 7:00 pm, ESPN3		Lipscomb	L 69–73	8–10 (1–2)	UNF Arena (286); Jacksonville, FL
01/20/2018; 4:30 pm, ESPN3		at USC Upstate	W 65–61	9–10 (2–2)	G. B. Hodge Center (232); Spartanburg, SC
01/22/2018; 7:00 pm, ESPN3		at NJIT	L 65–75	9–11 (2–3)	Wellness and Events Center (259); Newark, NJ
01/27/2018; 2:00 pm, ESPN3		at Stetson	L 55–68	9–12 (2–4)	Edmunds Center (477); DeLand, FL
02/01/2018; 7:00 pm, ESPN3		Florida Gulf Coast	W 75–73	10–12 (3–4)	UNF Arena (341); Jacksonville, FL
02/03/2018; 2:00 pm, ESPN3		Stetson	L 51–68	10–13 (3–5)	UNF Arena (421); Jacksonville, FL
02/06/2018; 7:00 pm, ESPN3		at Florida Gulf Coast	L 62–67	10–14 (3–6)	Alico Arena (2,413); Fort Myers, FL
02/10/2018; 2:30 pm, ESPN3		at Lipscomb	L 57–78	10–15 (3–7)	Allen Arena (317); Nashville, TN
02/12/2018; 7:00 pm, ESPN3		at Kennesaw State	W 78–57	11–15 (4–7)	KSU Convocation Center (706); Kennesaw, GA
02/17/2018; 2:00 pm, ESPN3		NJIT	L 62–66	11–16 (4–8)	UNF Arena (314); Jacksonville, FL
02/19/2018; 7:00 pm, ESPN3		USC Upstate	W 79–61	12–16 (5–8)	UNF Arena (259); Jacksonville, FL
02/24/2018; 2:00 pm, ESPN3		at Jacksonville	L 43–64	12–17 (5–9)	Swisher Gymnasium (707); Jacksonville, FL
Atlantic Sun Women's Tournament
03/02/2018; 7:00 pm, ESPN3	(6)	at (3) Stetson; Quarterfinals	W 63–55	13–17	Edmunds Center (437); DeLand, FL
03/07/2018; 7:00 pm, ESPN3	(6)	at (2) Jacksonville; Semifinals	L 77–83 ^{OT}	13–18	Swisher Gymnasium (1,010); Jacksonville, FL
*Non-conference game. ^{#}Rankings from AP Poll. (#) Tournament seedings in parentheses. All times are in Eastern Time.

== See also ==
- 2017–18 North Florida Ospreys men's basketball team
