= 2017–18 Stetson Hatters women's basketball team =

Intercollegiate basketball season

2017–18 Stetson Hatters women's basketball
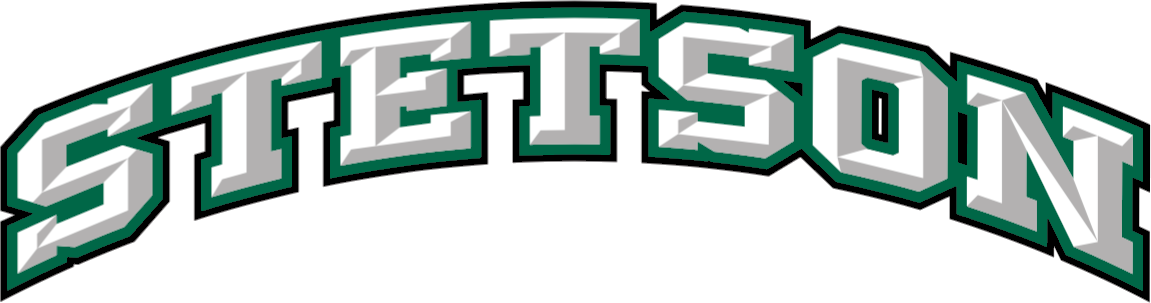

Hatter Classic Champions

WBI, First Round
- Conference: Atlantic Sun Conference
- Record: 17–15 (8–6 A-Sun)
- Head coach: Lynn Bria (10th season)
- Assistant coaches: Daniel Barber; Otavio Battaglia; Shanasa Sanders
- Home arena: Edmunds Center

2017–18 ASUN women's basketball standings
	Conf.				Overall
Team	W		L	PCT	W		L	PCT
Florida Gulf Coast †	13	–	1	.929	31	–	5	.861
Jacksonville	12	–	2	.857	24	–	9	.727
Stetson	8	–	6	.571	17	–	15	.531
Lipscomb	7	–	7	.500	12	–	19	.387
USC Upstate	6	–	8	.429	11	–	19	.367
North Florida	5	–	9	.357	13	–	18	.419
Kennesaw State	3	–	11	.214	7	–	19	.269
NJIT	2	–	12	.143	4	–	26	.133
† 2018 ASUN Tournament winner As of 19 March 2018; Rankings from AP poll

The 2017–18 Stetson Hatters women's basketball team represented Stetson University in the 2017–18 NCAA Division I women's basketball season. The Hatters, led by tenth year head coach Lynn Bria, played their home games at Edmunds Center and were members of the Atlantic Sun Conference. They finished the season 17–15, 8–6 in A-Sun play to finish in third place. They lost in the quarterfinals of the A-Sun women's tournament to North Florida. They were invited to the Women's Basketball Invitational, where they lost to South Alabama in the first round.

== Media ==
All home games and conference road are shown on ESPN3 or A-Sun.TV. Non conference road games are typically available on the opponents website. Audio broadcasts of Hatters games can be found on WSBB AM 1230/1490 with Ryan Rouse on the call.

== Roster ==
2017–18 Stetson Hatters women's basketball team
Players
Coaches

Pos.	#	Name	Height	Year	Previous school	Hometown
F	1	Sarah Sagerer	6 ft 3 in (1.91 m)	Sr	The Rock School	Vöcklabruck, Austria
G	2	McKenna Beach	5 ft 6 in (1.68 m)	Jr	Cape Coral HS	Cape Coral, FL
G	3	Sydney Wagner	5 ft 6 in (1.68 m)	Fr	Spring-Ford Senior HS	Phoenixville, PA
G	4	Johanna McMillan	5 ft 7 in (1.7 m)	RS Sr	Sanford School; UNC Wilmington	Mullica Hill, NJ
G	11	Addi Walters	5 ft 9 in (1.75 m)	Jr	St. Ignatius Prep; Cal State Bakersfield	San Francisco, CA
C	12	Re'Nique Francis	6 ft 3 in (1.91 m)	Jr	Charlotte Amalie HS	St. Thomas, VI
F	23	Megan Vincent	6 ft 4 in (1.93 m)	Fr	Keller HS	Keller, TX
F	24	Kennedi Colclough	6 ft 0 in (1.83 m)	So	Arundel HS	Gambrills, MD
G	30	Brittney Chambers	5 ft 6 in (1.68 m)	Sr	Apopka HS; Daytona State	Orlando, FL
G	31	Shania Meertens	5 ft 8 in (1.73 m)	Fr	Winter Springs HS	Winter Springs, FL
F	32	Jordan Tully	6 ft 2 in (1.88 m)	RS So	Oak Park HS; Boise State	Winnipeg, MB
F	33	Michelle Pruitt	5 ft 10 in (1.78 m)	Fr	Homewood-Flossmoor	Homewood, IL
F	35	Kendall Lentz	5 ft 11 in (1.8 m)	Fr	John Paul II	Garland, TX

Head coach

- Lynn Bria (Charleston (WV))

Assistant coach(es)

- Daniel Barber (Florida)
- Otavio Battaglia (São Paulo)
- Shanasa Sanders (Stetson)

Legend

- (C) Team captain
- (S) Suspended
- (I) Ineligible
- (W) Walk-on
- Injured
- Current redshirt

Roster
Last update: December 16, 2017

== Schedule ==
Date time, TV	Rank^{#}	Opponent^{#}	Result	Record	Site (attendance) city, state
Non-conference regular season
11/10/2017*; 2:30 pm, ESPN3		Thomas	W 95–41	1–0	Edmunds Center (520); DeLand, FL
11/12/2017*; 2:00 pm, LHN		at No. 2 Texas	L 59–95	1–1	Frank Erwin Center (3,415); Austin, TX
11/15/2017*; 5:00 pm, ESPN3		Chattanooga	W 78–67	2–1	Edmunds Center (171); DeLand, FL
11/21/2017*; 2:00 pm		vs. Wright State; Savannah Invitational	L 59–64	2–2	Savannah Civic Center (75); Savannah, GA
11/22/2017*; 7:00 pm		vs. Florida; Savannah Invitational	W 85–71	3–2	Savannah Civic Center (578); Savannah, GA
11/23/2017*; 4:30 pm		vs. Providence; Savannah Invitational	L 45–56	3–3	Savannah Civic Center (75); Savannah, GA
11/27/2017*; 7:00 pm, ESPN3		High Point	L 64–69	3–4	Edmunds Center (345); DeLand, FL
11/29/2017*; 7:00 pm, ESPN3		Northern Kentucky	W 67–56	4–4	Edmunds Center (317); DeLand, FL
12/01/2017*; 11:00 am, ESPN3		Webber International	W 67–30	5–4	Edmunds Center (1,608); DeLand, FL
12/03/2017*; 3:00 pm		at SIU Edwardsville	W 65–61	6–4	Vadalabene Center (702); Edwardsville, IL
12/07/2017*; 7:00 pm, ACCN Extra		at No. 13 Florida State	L 39–84	6–5	Donald L. Tucker Center (3,403); Tallahassee, FL
12/16/2017*; 12:00 pm		vs. Western Kentucky; West Palm Invitational	L 58–66	6–6	Student Life Center (125); West Palm Beach, FL
12/20/2017*; 1:00 pm, ESPN3		Richmond; Hatter Classic	W 72–67	7–6	Edmunds Center (353); DeLand, FL
12/21/2017*; 1:00 pm, ESPN3		Texas State; Hatter Classic	W 61–54	8–6	Edmunds Center (279); DeLand, FL
12/29/2017*; 2:30 pm		vs. UMKC; FAU Holiday Classic semifinals	L 50–67	8–7	FAU Arena (661); Boca Raton, FL
12/30/2017*; 12:00 pm		vs. Delaware State; FAU Holiday Classic 3rd place game	W 58–43	9–7	FAU Arena (100); Boca Raton, FL
Atlantic Sun regular season
01/06/2018; 4:00 pm, ESPN3		at Florida Gulf Coast	L 40–80	9–8 (0–1)	Alico Arena (2,407); Fort Myers, FL
01/13/2018; 4:00 pm, ESPN3		USC Upstate	W 62–61	10–8 (1–1)	Edmunds Center (357); DeLand, FL
01/15/2018; 1:00 pm, ESPN3		NJIT	W 73–55	11–8 (2–1)	Edmunds Center (357); DeLand, FL
01/20/2018; 2:30 pm, ESPN3		at Lipscomb	W 59–55	12–8 (3–1)	Allen Arena (1,136); Nashville, TN
01/22/2018; 7:00 pm, ESPN3		at Kennesaw State	L 49–66	12–9 (3–2)	KSU Convocation Center (618); Kennesaw, GA
01/27/2018; 1:00 pm, ESPN3		North Florida	W 68–55	13–9 (4–2)	Edmunds Center (477); DeLand, FL
02/01/2018; 7:00 pm, ESPN3		at Jacksonville	L 63–73	13–10 (4–3)	Swisher Gymnasium (599); Jacksonville, FL
02/03/2018; 2:00 pm, ESPN3		at North Florida	W 68–51	14–10 (5–3)	UNF Arena (421); Jacksonville, FL
02/07/2018; 7:00 pm, ESPN3		Jacksonville	L 54–61	14–11 (5–4)	Edmunds Center (374); DeLand, FL
02/10/2018; 1:00 pm, ESPN3		at NJIT	W 72–53	15–11 (5–5)	Wellness and Events Center; Newark, NJ
02/12/2018; 7:00 pm, ESPN3		at USC Upstate	L 64–69	15–12 (6–5)	G. B. Hodge Center (318); Spartanburg, SC
02/17/2018; 1:00 pm, ESPN3		Kennesaw State	W 96–53	16–12 (7–5)	Edmunds Center (349); DeLand, FL
02/19/2018; 7:00 pm, ESPN3		Lipscomb	W 91–71	17–12 (8–5)	Edmunds Center (708); DeLand, FL
02/24/2018; 1:00 pm, ESPN3		Florida Gulf Coast	L 60–74	17–13 (8–6)	Edmunds Center (446); DeLand, FL
Atlantic Sun Tournament
03/02/2018; 7:00 pm, ESPN3	(3)	(6) North Florida; Quarterfinals	L 55–63	17–14	Edmunds Center (437); DeLand, FL
WBI
03/15/2018*; 8:00 pm		at South Alabama; First Round	L 33–49	17–15	Mitchell Center (707); Mobile, AL
*Non-conference game. ^{#}Rankings from AP Poll. (#) Tournament seedings in parentheses. All times are in Eastern Time.

== Rankings ==
2017–18 NCAA Division I women's basketball rankings

+ Regular season polls	Poll	Pre- Season	Week 2	Week 3	Week 4	Week 5	Week 6	Week 7	Week 8	Week 9	Week 10	Week 11	Week 12	Week 13	Week 14	Week 15	Week 16	Week 17	Week 18	Week 19	Final
AP																				N/A	
Coaches																					

Legend
	Increase in ranking
	Decrease in ranking
	No change
(RV)	Received votes
(NR)	Not ranked

== See also ==
- 2017–18 Stetson Hatters men's basketball team
