= 2017–18 Kennesaw State Owls women's basketball team =

Intercollegiate basketball season

2017–18 Kennesaw State Owls women's basketball
- Conference: Atlantic Sun Conference
- Record: 7–19 (3–11 Atlantic Sun)
- Head coach: Agnus Berenato (2nd season)
- Assistant coaches: Khadija Head; Sherill Baker; Jania Sims
- Home arena: KSU Convocation Center

2017–18 ASUN women's basketball standings
	Conf.				Overall
Team	W		L	PCT	W		L	PCT
Florida Gulf Coast †	13	–	1	.929	31	–	5	.861
Jacksonville	12	–	2	.857	24	–	9	.727
Stetson	8	–	6	.571	17	–	15	.531
Lipscomb	7	–	7	.500	12	–	19	.387
USC Upstate	6	–	8	.429	11	–	19	.367
North Florida	5	–	9	.357	13	–	18	.419
Kennesaw State	3	–	11	.214	7	–	19	.269
NJIT	2	–	12	.143	4	–	26	.133
† 2018 ASUN Tournament winner As of 19 March 2018; Rankings from AP poll

The 2017–18 Kennesaw State Owls women's basketball team represented Kennesaw State University during the 2017–18 NCAA Division I women's basketball season. The Owls, led by second-year head coach Agnus Berenato, played their home games at the KSU Convocation Center and were members of the Atlantic Sun Conference. They finished the season 7–19, 3–11 in A-Sun play to finish in seventh place. They lost in the quarterfinals of the A-Sun Tournament to Jacksonville.

== Roster ==
2017–18 Kennesaw State Owls women's basketball team
Players
Coaches

Pos.	#	Name	Height	Year	Previous school	Hometown
G	2	Kamiyah Street	5 ft 5 in (1.65 m)	Fr	Mays	Atlanta, GA
F	10	Alexis Poole	6 ft 2 in (1.88 m)	Fr	Stockbridge	Ellenwood, GA
G	11	Clara Young	5 ft 8 in (1.73 m)	RS Sr	Woodstock; Samford	Woodstock, GA
G/F	12	Alexandra Landby	6 ft 2 in (1.88 m)	RS So	Norra Real	Stockholm, Sweden
F/C	13	Carlotta Gianolla	6 ft 1 in (1.85 m)	So	Francesco Algarotti	Marcon, Italy
C	14	Simina Avram (redshirt)	6 ft 3 in (1.91 m)	Sr	Andrei Saguna; Georgia Tech	Brasov, Romania
G	21	Breanna Hoover	5 ft 6 in (1.68 m)	Fr	Blackhawk	Beaver Falls, PA
G	24	Iceis Walker	5 ft 7 in (1.7 m)	Jr	Mountain View	Lawrenceville, GA
F	32	Janae Omusi	6 ft 0 in (1.83 m)	Jr	Saddleback	San Diego, CA
F	33	Lexi Mann	6 ft 1 in (1.85 m)	Fr	Greater Atlanta Christian School	Stone Mountain, GA
C	55	Caroline Dan	6 ft 3 in (1.91 m)	Fr	Falkonergaarden Gymnasium	Copenhagen, Denmark

Head coach

- Agnus Berenato (Mount St. Mary's)

Assistant coach(es)

- Khadija Head (Murray State)
- Sherill Baker (Georgia)
- Jania Sims (Pittsburgh)

Legend

- (C) Team captain
- (S) Suspended
- (I) Ineligible
- (W) Walk-on
- Injured
- Current redshirt

Roster
Last update: December 15, 2017

== Schedule ==
Date time, TV	Rank^{#}	Opponent^{#}	Result	Record	Site (attendance) city, state
Exhibition
11/05/2017*; 2:00 pm		Thomas	W 68–40		KSU Convocation Center (331); Kennesaw, GA
Non-conference regular season
11/10/2017*; 11:00 am, ACCN Extra		at Clemson	L 28–41	0–1	Littlejohn Coliseum (692); Clemson, SC
11/13/2017*; 8:30 pm		at Ole Miss	L 63–92	0–2	The Pavilion at Ole Miss (7,042); Oxford, MS
11/15/2017*; 7:00 pm, ACCN Extra		at Georgia Tech	L 48–86	0–3	McCamish Pavilion (904); Atlanta, GA
11/18/2017*; 7:00 pm, ESPN3		at Furman	L 59–78	0–4	Timmons Arena (214); Greenville, SC
11/21/2017*; 7:00 pm, BSN		at Presbyterian	W 60–51	1–4	Templeton Center (126); Clinton, SC
11/24/2017*; 2:00 pm		vs. No. 15 Maryland; Miami Thanksgiving Tournament	L 35–89	1–5	Watsco Center (676); Coral Gables, FL
11/26/2017*; 2:00 pm		vs. Maine; Miami Thanksgiving Tournament	L 39–75	1–6	Watsco Center (884); Coral Gables, FL
11/30/2017*; 7:00 pm, ESPN3		Georgia State	W 71–61	2–6	KSU Convocation Center (545); Kennesaw, GA
12/02/2017*; 2:00 pm, ESPN3		Middle Georgia State	W 81–65	3–6	KSU Convocation Center (243); Kennesaw, GA
12/04/2017*; 5:00 pm, ESPN3		East Carolina	L 66–76	3–7	KSU Convocation Center (342); Kennesaw, GA
12/15/2017*; 11:00 am		at Georgia Southern	W 60–58 ^{OT}	4–7	Hanner Fieldhouse (2,123); Statesoro, GA
12/18/2017*; 2:00 pm		vs. Puerto Rico–Bayamón; Puerto Rico Classic	Cancelled		Coliseo Rubén Zayas Montañez; San Juan, PR
12/19/2017*; 4:30 pm		vs. Miami (FL); Puerto Rico Classic	Cancelled		Coliseo Rubén Zayas Montañez; San Juan, PR
12/20/2017*; 2:00 pm		vs. Southern Illinois; Puerto Rico Classic	Cancelled		Coliseo Rubén Zayas Montañez; San Juan, PR
01/03/2018*; 7:00 pm		at Savannah State	Cancelled		Tiger Arena; Savannah, GA
Atlantic Sun Conference season
01/06/2018; 2:00 pm, ESPN3		Lipscomb	L 62–64	4–8 (0–1)	KSU Convocation Center (978); Kennesaw, GA
01/13/2018; 2:00 pm, ESPN3		at North Florida	L 72–77	4–9 (0–2)	UNF Arena (292); Jacksonville, FL
01/15/2018; 1:00 pm, ESPN3		at Jacksonville	L 49–84	4–10 (0–3)	Swisher Gymnasium (423); Jacksonville, FL
01/20/2018; 2:00 pm, ESPN3		Florida Gulf Coast	L 57–78	4–11 (0–4)	KSU Convocation Center (961); Kennesaw, GA
01/22/2018; 7:00 pm, ESPN3		Stetson	W 66–49	5–11 (1–4)	KSU Convocation Center (618); Kennesaw, GA
01/27/2018; 7:00 pm, ESPN3		at USC Upstate	L 61–65	5–12 (1–5)	G. B. Hodge Center (264); Spartanburg, SC
02/01/2018; 11:00 am, ESPN3		NJIT	W 80–65	6–12 (2–5)	KSU Convocation Center (1,017); Kennesaw, GA
02/03/2018; 2:00 pm, ESPN3		USC Upstate	L 64–70	6–13 (2–6)	KSU Convocation Center (471); Kennesaw, GA
02/07/2018; 7:00 pm, ESPN3		at NJIT	W 61–58	7–13 (3–6)	Wellness and Events Center (289); Newark, NJ
02/10/2018; 2:00 pm, ESPN3		Jacksonville	L 49–67	7–14 (3–7)	KSU Convocation Center (652); Kennesaw, GA
02/12/2018; 7:00 pm, ESPN3		North Florida	L 57–78	7–15 (3–8)	KSU Convocation Center (706); Kennesaw, GA
02/19/2018; 1:00 pm, ESPN3		at Stetson	L 53–96	7–16 (3–9)	Edmunds Center (349); DeLand, FL
02/19/2018; 7:00 pm, ESPN3		at Florida Gulf Coast	L 51–78	7–17 (3–10)	Alico Arena (2,604); Fort Myers, FL
02/24/2018; 5:00 pm, ESPN3		at Lipscomb	L 52–69	7–18 (3–11)	Allen Arena (205); Nashville, TN
Atlantic Sun Women's Tournament
03/02/2018; 7:00 pm, ESPN3	(7)	at (2) Jacksonville; Quarterfinals	L 52–79	7–19	Swisher Gymnaisum (379); Jacksonville, FL
*Non-conference game. ^{#}Rankings from AP Poll. (#) Tournament seedings in parentheses. All times are in Eastern Time.

== Rankings ==
2017–18 NCAA Division I women's basketball rankings

+ Regular season polls	Poll	Pre- season	Week 2	Week 3	Week 4	Week 5	Week 6	Week 7	Week 8	Week 9	Week 10	Week 11	Week 12	Week 13	Week 14	Week 15	Week 16	Week 17	Week 18	Week 19	Final
AP																				N/A	
Coaches																					

Legend
	Increase in ranking
	Decrease in ranking
	No change
(RV)	Received votes
(NR)	Not ranked

== See also ==
- 2017–18 Kennesaw State Owls men's basketball team
