= 2017–18 USC Upstate Spartans women's basketball team =

Intercollegiate basketball season

2017–18 USC Upstate Spartans women's basketball
- Conference: Atlantic Sun Conference
- Record: 11–19 (6–8 A-Sun)
- Head coach: Tammy George (13th season)
- Assistant coaches: Jason Rasnake; Johnette Walker; Darian Riley
- Home arena: G. B. Hodge Center

2017–18 ASUN women's basketball standings
	Conf.				Overall
Team	W		L	PCT	W		L	PCT
Florida Gulf Coast †	13	–	1	.929	31	–	5	.861
Jacksonville	12	–	2	.857	24	–	9	.727
Stetson	8	–	6	.571	17	–	15	.531
Lipscomb	7	–	7	.500	12	–	19	.387
USC Upstate	6	–	8	.429	11	–	19	.367
North Florida	5	–	9	.357	13	–	18	.419
Kennesaw State	3	–	11	.214	7	–	19	.269
NJIT	2	–	12	.143	4	–	26	.133
† 2018 ASUN Tournament winner As of 19 March 2018; Rankings from AP poll

The 2017–18 USC Upstate Spartans women's basketball team represented the University of South Carolina Upstate in the 2017–18 NCAA Division I women's basketball season. The Spartans, led by thirteenth year head coach Tammy George, played their games at G. B. Hodge Center and were members of the Atlantic Sun Conference. They finished the season 11–19, 6–8 in A-Sun play to finish in fifth place. They lost in the quarterfinals of A-Sun Tournament to Lipscomb.

The season marked the final season for USC Upstate as members of the Atlantic Sun Conference, as the school announced on November 15, 2017 that they will be moving to the Big South Conference for the 2018–19 season.

== Media ==
All home games and conference road are shown on ESPN3 or A-Sun.TV. Non conference road games are typically available on the opponents website.

== Roster ==
2017–18 USC Upstate Spartans women's basketball team
Players
Coaches

Pos.	#	Name	Height	Year	Previous school	Hometown
G	0	Brittney Delva	5 ft 6 in (1.68 m)	Sr	Amos P. Goby HS; South Georgia Tech College	Boynton Beach, FL
G	1	Tamera Thrope	5 ft 8 in (1.73 m)	Jr	Greensboro Day School	Greensboro, NC
G	3	Breanna Jefferson	5 ft 6 in (1.68 m)	So	Virginia Episcopal School	Lynchburg, VA
G	10	Rylie Parkhurst	5 ft 8 in (1.73 m)	So	Miamisburg HS	Miamisburg, OH
G	11	Camilla Kilinc	5 ft 9 in (1.75 m)	Jr	Filbornaskolan School; Monroe CC	Helsingborg, Sweden
G	15	Anda Kuzmina	5 ft 10 in (1.78 m)	Fr	Latvijas Universitate	Riga, Latvia
G	20	Bailey Wensler	5 ft 8 in (1.73 m)	Jr	Perkins-Tryon HS	Stillwater, OK
C	21	Riley Popplewell	5 ft 11 in (1.8 m)	So	South Central HS	Union Mills, IN
G	22	Diamon Shiflet	5 ft 9 in (1.75 m)	Fr	Greer HS	Taylors, SC
G	23	DeNisha Swain	5 ft 7 in (1.7 m)	Jr	Potter's House Christian Academy	Jacksonville, FL
C	24	A'Lexxus Davis	6 ft 1 in (1.85 m)	Sr	Potter's House Christian Academy	Jacksonville, FL
C	30	Morgan Williams	5 ft 9 in (1.75 m)	RS So	Dutch Fork HS; Coker College	Irmo, SC
F	32	Latasha Johnson	5 ft 9 in (1.75 m)	RS Fr	Woodmont HS	Greenville, SC
F	33	Michaela Gibbons	5 ft 11 in (1.8 m)	Fr	Hopewell HS	Troutman, NC
G	35	Victoria Hadler	5 ft 11 in (1.8 m)	RS So	Deerfield HS	Deerfield Beach, FL

Head coach

- Tammy George (Charlotte)

Assistant coach(es)

- Jason Rasnake (NC State)
- Johnette Walker (Radford)
- Darian Riley (LSU)

Legend

- (C) Team captain
- (S) Suspended
- (I) Ineligible
- (W) Walk-on
- Injured
- Current redshirt

Roster
Last update: December 16, 2017

== Schedule ==
Date time, TV	Rank^{#}	Opponent^{#}	Result	Record	Site (attendance) city, state
Non-conference regular season
11/10/2017*; 8:00 pm		at East Carolina	L 53–66	0–1	Williams Arena (954); Greenville, TN
11/15/2017*; 7:00 pm, ESPN3		Presbyterian	L 69–83	0–2	G. B. Hodge Center (317); Spartanburg, SC
11/17/2017*; 9:00 pm, ACCN Extra		at Virginia Tech	L 56–87	0–3	Cassell Coliseum (2,162); Blacksburg, VA
11/19/2017*; 2:00 pm		at Campbell	L 49–69	0–4	Gore Arena (864); Buies Creek, NC
11/21/2017*; 5:00 pm, ESPN3		Converse	W 71–51	1–4	G. B. Hodge Center (151); Spartanburg, SC
11/24/2017*; 3:00 pm, ESPN3		Omaha	L 66–69	1–5	G. B. Hodge Center (218); Spartanburg, SC
11/28/2017*; 11:00 am		at Gardner–Webb	L 39–60	1–6	Paul Porter Arena (347); Boiling Springs, NC
11/30/2017*; 5:00 pm, ESPN3		Bob Jones	W 79–45	2–6	G. B. Hodge Center (187); Spartanburg, SC
12/03/2017*; 2:00 pm, ESPN3		Furman	L 59–80	2–7	G. B. Hodge Center (120); Spartanburg, SC
12/05/2017*; 7:00 pm		at William & Mary	L 63–83	2–8	Kaplan Arena (549); Williamsburg, VA
12/09/2017*; 2:00 pm, ESPN3		South Carolina State	W 63–44	3–8	G. B. Hodge Center (148); Spartanburg, SC
12/16/2017*; 2:00 pm, ESPN3		UNC Asheville	L 70–76	3–9	G. B. Hodge Center (164); Spartanburg, SC
12/19/2017*; 6:00 pm		at Oklahoma State	L 71–108	3–10	Gallagher-Iba Arena (1,830); Stillwater, OK
12/30/2017*; 4:30 pm, ESPN3		North Carolina Central	W 66–61	4–10	G. B. Hodge Center (192); Spartanburg, SC
01/02/2018*; 5:00 pm, ESPN3		Brevard	W 109–39	5–10	G. B. Hodge Center; Spartanburg, SC
Atlantic Sun regular season
01/06/2018; 1:00 pm, ESPN3		at NJIT	W 97–59	6–10 (1–0)	Wellness and Events Center (199); Newark, NJ
01/13/2018; 4:00 pm, ESPN3		at Stetson	L 61–62	6–11 (1–1)	Edmunds Center (357); DeLand, FL
01/15/2018; 7:00 pm, ESPN3		at Florida Gulf Coast	L 60–93	6–12 (1–2)	Alico Arena (2,347); Fort Myers, FL
01/20/2018; 7:00 pm, ESPN3		North Florida	L 61–65	6–13 (1–3)	G. B. Hodge Center (232); Spartanburg, SC
01/22/2018; 7:00 pm, ESPN3		Jacksonville	L 45–71	6–14 (1–4)	G. B. Hodge Center (231); Spartanburg, SC
01/27/2018; 7:00 pm, ESPN3		Kennesaw State	W 65–61	7–14 (2–4)	G. B. Hodge Center (264); Spartanburg, SC
02/01/2018; 7:30 pm, ESPN3		at Lipscomb	L 78–97	7–15 (2–5)	Allen Arena (367); Nashville, TN
02/03/2018; 2:00 pm, ESPN3		at Kennesaw State	W 70–64	8–15 (3–5)	KSU Convocation Center (471); Kennesaw, GA
02/07/2018; 7:00 pm, ESPN3		Lipscomb	W 80–64	9–15 (4–5)	G. B. Hodge Center (438); Spartanburg, SC
02/10/2018; 1:30 pm, ESPN3		Florida Gulf Coast	L 44–88	9–16 (4–6)	G. B. Hodge Center (315); Spartanburg, SC
02/12/2018; 7:00 pm, ESPN3		Stetson	W 69–64	10–16 (5–6)	G. B. Hodge Center (318); Spartanburg, SC
02/17/2018; 1:00 pm, ESPN3		at Jacksonville	L 49–65	10–17 (5–7)	Swisher Gymnasium (489); Jacksonville, FL
02/19/2018; 7:00 pm, ESPN3		at North Florida	L 61–79	10–18 (5–8)	UNF Arena (259); Jacksonville, FL
02/24/2018; 1:00 pm, ESPN3		NJIT	W 74–67	11–18 (6–8)	G. B. Hodge Center (237); Spartanburg, SC
Atlantic Sun Women's Tournament
03/02/2018; 8:00 pm, ESPN3	(5)	at (4) Lipscomb; Quarterfinals	L 53–95	11–19	Allen Arena (401); Nashville, TN
*Non-conference game. ^{#}Rankings from AP Poll. (#) Tournament seedings in parentheses. All times are in Eastern Time.

== See also ==
- 2017–18 USC Upstate Spartans men's basketball team
