= 2018 Big West Conference women's basketball tournament =

- Classification: Division I
- Season: 2017–18
- Teams: 8
- First round site: Titan Gym; Fullerton, CA
- Quarterfinals site: Titan Gym; Fullerton, CA
- Semifinals site: Honda Center; Anaheim, CA
- Finals site: Honda Center; Anaheim, CA
- Champions: Cal State Northridge (3rd title)
- Winning coach: Jason Flowers (3rd title)
- MVP: Tessa Boagni (Cal State Fullerton)
- Attendance: 3,069
- Television: ESPN3; Prime Ticket

2017–18 Big West women's basketball standings
	Conf.				Overall
Team	W		L	PCT	W		L	PCT
UC Davis	14	–	2	.875	28	–	7	.800
Cal Poly	11	–	5	.688	17	–	12	.586
UC Irvine	10	–	6	.625	18	–	13	.581
UC Santa Barbara	9	–	7	.563	12	–	17	.414
Cal State Northridge †	8	–	8	.500	19	–	16	.543
UC Riverside	6	–	10	.375	11	–	22	.333
Long Beach State	6	–	10	.375	8	–	23	.258
Hawaii	5	–	11	.313	12	–	18	.400
Cal State Fullerton	3	–	13	.188	8	–	21	.276
† 2018 Big West tournament winner As of 25 March 2018; Rankings from AP poll

The 2018 Big West Conference women's basketball tournament took place March 6–10, 2018, at two venues in the Los Angeles area. The first two rounds were scheduled for Titan Gym in Fullerton, California, while the semifinals and championship were held at the Honda Center in Anaheim. Cal State Northridge, the winner of the Big West tournament received the conference's automatic bid to the 2018 NCAA Women's Division I Basketball Tournament.

== Seeds ==
Seed	School	Conference	Overall	Tiebreaker
1	UC Davis	14–1	24–4	
2	Cal Poly	10–5	16–11	
3	UC Irvine	9–6	15–12	
4	UCSB	9–7	12–16	
5	Cal Northridge	8–7	15–14	
6	UC Riverside	5–10	8–21	
7	Long Beach State	5–10	7–22	
8	Hawaii	5–10	12–16	

== Schedule ==
Session	Game	Time*	Matchup^{#}	Television	Attendance
First round – Wednesday, March 6
1	1	6:00 PM	#5 Cal State Northridge vs. #8 Hawaii	ESPN3	427
1	2	8:30 PM	#6 UC Riverside vs. #7 Long Beach State	ESPN3	427
Quarterfinals – Thursday, March 7
2	3	6:00 PM	#3 UC Irvine vs. #6 UC Riverside	ESPN3	502
2	4	8:30 PM	#4 UC Santa Barbara vs. #5 Cal State Northridge	ESPN3	502
Semifinals – Friday, March 9
3	5	12:00 PM	#1 UC Davis vs. #6 UC Riverside	ESPN3	867
3	6	2:30 PM	#2 Cal Poly vs. #5 Cal State Northridge	ESPN3	867
Championship Game – Saturday, March 10
4	7	4:00 PM	#1 UC Davis vs. #5 Cal State Northridge	Prime Ticket	1,273
*Game Times in PT. #-Rankings denote tournament seeding.

== Bracket ==
First round (Re-Seeded); Tuesday, March 6 ESPN3
5	Cal State Northridge	62
8	Hawaii	57
6	UC Riverside	79
7	Long Beach State	66

Quarterfinals (Re-Seeded); Wednesday, March 7 ESPN3
4	UC Santa Barbara	63
5	Cal State Northridge	72
3	UC Irvine	74
6	UC Riverside	86

Semifinals (Re-Seeded); Friday, March 9 ESPN3
2	Cal Poly	50
5	Cal State Northridge	73
1	UC Davis	49
6	UC Riverside	46

Championship game Saturday, March 10; Prime Ticket
1	UC Davis	55
5	Cal State Northridge	63

== See also ==
- 2018 Big West Conference men's basketball tournament
