= NJIT Highlanders women's basketball =

NJIT Highlanders
2024–25 NJIT Highlanders women's basketball team
- Institution: New Jersey Institute of Technology
- Head coach: Mike Lane (9th season)
- Location: Newark, New Jersey
- Arena: Wellness and Events Center (capacity: 3,500)
- Conference: America East
- Nickname: Highlanders
- Colors: Red and white

Conference tournament champions
- 2013 (Great West Conference)

The NJIT Highlanders women's basketball team is the basketball team that represents New Jersey Institute of Technology in Newark, New Jersey, United States. The school's teams are members of the America East Conference.

== History ==
The Highlanders joined Division I in 2006 after being in Division II since 1997. In the final year of the Great West Conference, NJIT (who had finished 2nd out of the 5 teams with a 6–2 conference record) won the tournament, their first ever in school history. They have never qualified for the NCAA Tournament.
