= 2018 America East women's basketball tournament =

- Classification: Division I
- Season: 2017–18
- Teams: 9
- Quarterfinals site: Cross Insurance Arena; Portland, ME
- Semifinals site: Cross Insurance Arena; Portland, ME
- Finals site: Cross Insurance Center; Bangor, ME
- Champions: Maine (8th title)
- Winning coach: Amy Vachon (1st title)
- MVP: Blanca Millan (Maine)
- Television: ESPNU/ESPN3
- America East women's basketball tournaments

2017–18 America East Conference women's basketball standings
	Conf.				Overall
Team	W		L	PCT	W		L	PCT
Maine †	13	–	3	.813	23	–	10	.697
Albany	12	–	4	.750	24	–	8	.750
Binghamton	10	–	6	.625	20	–	12	.625
Stony Brook	10	–	6	.625	18	–	12	.600
Hartford	9	–	7	.563	19	–	13	.594
New Hampshire	9	–	7	.563	19	–	12	.613
Vermont	5	–	11	.313	8	–	22	.267
UMBC	3	–	13	.188	5	–	26	.161
UMass Lowell	1	–	15	.063	4	–	26	.133
† 2018 America East tournament winner As of 20 March 2018; Rankings from AP poll

The 2018 America East women's basketball tournament began on February 28 and concluded with the championship game on March 9. Maine, the winner of the America East, earned an automatic bid to the 2018 NCAA tournament.

== Seeds ==
Teams are seeded by record within the conference, with a tiebreaker system to seed teams with identical conference records.

Seed	School	Conf	Overall	Tiebreaker
#1	Maine	13–3	20–9	
#2	Albany	12–4	23–6	
#3	Binghamton	10–6	19–10	higher RPI
#4	Stony Brook	10–6	17–11	
#5	UNH	9–7	18–11	higher RPI
#6	Hartford	9–7	17–12	
#7	Vermont	5–11	8–21	
#8	UMBC	3–13	5–25	
#9	Mass-Lowell	1–15	4–26	

== Schedule ==
All tournament games are nationally televised on an ESPN network:

Session	Game	Time*	Matchup^{#}	Television	Attendance
First Round Game – Wednesday, February 28
1	1	6:00pm	#9 Mass-Lowell at #8 UMBC	ESPN3	281
Quarterfinals – Saturday, March 3
2	2	12:00pm	#1 Maine vs. #8 UMBC	ESPN3	2,158
2	3	2:15pm	#4 Stony Brook vs. #5 UNH	ESPN3	2,158
3	4	6:00pm	#2 Albany vs. #7 Vermont	ESPN3	2,158
3	5	8:15pm	#3 Binghamton vs. #6 Hartford	ESPN3	2,158
Semifinals – Sunday, March 4
4	6	2:00pm	#1 Maine vs #5 UNH	ESPN3	
4	7	4:30pm	#2 Albany vs #6 Hartford	ESPN3	
Championship Game – Friday, March 9
5	8	4:00 PM	#6 Hartford at #1 Maine	ESPNU	3,373
*Game Times in EST. #-Rankings denote tournament seeding.

== Bracket and Results ==
First round Wednesday, February 28, 2018; ESPN3
8	UMBC	73
9	Mass-Lowell	65

Quarterfinals; Saturday, March 3, 2018; ESPN3
1	Maine	65
8	UMBC	43
4	Stony Brook	54
5	UNH	71
2	Albany	60
7	Vermont	42
3	Binghamton	68
6	Hartford	72

Semifinals; Sunday, March 4, 2018; ESPN3
1	Maine	64
5	UNH	48
2	Albany	56
6	Hartford	58

Championship Game; Friday, March 9, 2018; ESPNU
1	Maine	75
6	Hartford	64

All times listed are Eastern

== See also ==
- 2018 America East men's basketball tournament
