= 2017–18 Maine Black Bears women's basketball team =

Intercollegiate basketball season

2017–18 Maine Black Bears women's basketball

America East Regular Season and Tournament champions

NCAA Women's Tournament, first round
- Conference: America East Conference
- Record: 23–10 (13–5 America East)
- Head coach: Amy Vachon (Interim) (7th season); Richard Barron
- Assistant coaches: Jhasmin Player; Courtney Anderson England; Garett Sherman
- Home arena: Memorial Gym; Cross Insurance Center

2017–18 America East Conference women's basketball standings
	Conf.				Overall
Team	W		L	PCT	W		L	PCT
Maine †	13	–	3	.813	23	–	10	.697
Albany	12	–	4	.750	24	–	8	.750
Binghamton	10	–	6	.625	20	–	12	.625
Stony Brook	10	–	6	.625	18	–	12	.600
Hartford	9	–	7	.563	19	–	13	.594
New Hampshire	9	–	7	.563	19	–	12	.613
Vermont	5	–	11	.313	8	–	22	.267
UMBC	3	–	13	.188	5	–	26	.161
UMass Lowell	1	–	15	.063	4	–	26	.133
† 2018 America East tournament winner As of 20 March 2018; Rankings from AP poll

The 2017–18 Maine Black Bears women's basketball team represented the University of Maine Black Bears in the 2017–18 NCAA Division I women's basketball season. The Black Bears, led by seventh year head coach Richard Barron and interim head coach Amy Vachon, play their home games at the Cross Insurance Center with 2 games played at Memorial Gym and are members of the America East Conference. They finished the season 23–10, 15–1 in America East play to win the America East Regular Season. They also won the America East women's tournament and earned an automatic trip to the NCAA women's tournament for the first time since 2004. They lost to Texas in the first round.

== Media ==
All home games and conference road games will stream on either ESPN3 or AmericaEast.tv. Most road games will stream on the opponents website. All games will be broadcast on the radio on WGUY and online on the Maine Portal.

== Roster ==
2017–18 Maine Black Bears women's basketball team
Players
Coaches

Pos.	#	Name	Height	Year	Previous school	Hometown
G	2	Sierra Tapley	5 ft 8 in (1.73 m)	So	Mount Desert Island	Bar Harbor, ME
G	4	Maddy McVicar	5 ft 4 in (1.63 m)	Jr	Calais	Calais, ME
F	5	Maeve Carroll	5 ft 11 in (1.8 m)	Fr	Georgetown Visitation Preparatory	Oakton, VA
G	10	Julie Brosseau	5 ft 8 in (1.73 m)	So	Collège Montmorency	Repentigny, QE
G	12	Parise Rossignol	5 ft 8 in (1.73 m)	Jr	Van Buren	Van Buren, ME
G	15	Dor Saar	5 ft 6 in (1.68 m)	Fr	Israeli Basketball Academy	Ma'anit, Israel
G	20	Kelly Fogarty	5 ft 9 in (1.75 m)	Fr	Walpole	Walpole, MA
G	22	Blanca Millan	5 ft 11 in (1.8 m)	So	Colegio Manuel Peleteiro	Santiago de Compostela, Spain
G	23	Tanesha Sutton	5 ft 10 in (1.78 m)	RS Jr	Ss. Neumann and Goretti; Duquesne	Philadelphia, PA
C	31	Kat Williams	6 ft 5 in (1.96 m)	Fr	Marjory Stoneman Douglas	Coral Springs, FL
F	32	Kira Barra	6 ft 3 in (1.91 m)	Fr	Theo Koch Schule	Dillingen, Germany
F	33	Kirsten Johnson	6 ft 2 in (1.88 m)	Sr	Academy of Our Lady Peace	San Diego, CA
F	51	Fanny Wadling	6 ft 1 in (1.85 m)	So	Luleå Praktiska Gymnasium	Nacka, Sweden

Head coach

- Amy Vachon (Maine)

Assistant coach(es)

- Jhasmin Player (Baylor)
- Courtney Anderson England (Maine)
- Garett Sherman (Frostburg State)

Legend

- (C) Team captain
- (S) Suspended
- (I) Ineligible
- (W) Walk-on
- Injured
- Current redshirt

Roster

== Schedule ==
Date time, TV	Rank^{#}	Opponent^{#}	Result	Record	Site (attendance) city, state
Exhibition
10/28/2017*; 5:00 pm		Stonehill	L 49–68		Cross Insurance Center (1,250); Bangor, ME
Non-conference regular season
11/10/2017*; 6:00 pm, ESPN3		Tulane; Maine Tip-Off Tournament semifinals	L 34–42	0–1	Memorial Gym (1,054); Orono, ME
11/11/2017*; 4:00 pm, ESPN3		Harvard; Maine Tip-Off Tournament 3rd place game	W 76–51	1–1	Memorial Gym (855); Orono, ME
11/14/2017*; 7:00 pm, ESPN3		Bryant	W 70–68 ^{OT}	2–1	Cross Insurance Center (1,137); Bangor, ME
11/16/2017*; 7:00 pm, ESPN3		Maine–Fort Kent	W 100–40	3–1	Cross Insurance Center (1,082); Bangor, ME
11/24/2017*; 4:00 pm, ACCN Extra		at Miami (FL); Miami Thanksgiving Tournament	L 73–80	3–2	Watsco Center (713); Coral Gables, FL
11/26/2017*; 2:30 pm		vs. Kennesaw State; Miami Thanksgiving Tournament	W 75–39	4–2	Watsco Center (884); Coral Gables, FL
11/30/2017*; 7:00 pm, ESPN3		at Toledo	L 64–65 ^{OT}	4–3	Savage Arena (3,208); Toledo, OH
12/03/2017*; 1:00 pm		at No. 8 Ohio State	L 70–83	4–4	Value City Arena (5,879); Columbus, OH
12/05/2017*; 5:00 pm, ESPN3		Maine Maritime Academy	W 89–49	5–4	Cross Insurance Center (1,964); Bangor, ME
12/09/2017*; 12:00 pm		at Dartmouth	W 64–51	6–4	Leede Arena (571); Hanover, NH
12/17/2017*; 3:00 pm		at No. 5 Mississippi State	L 43–83	6–5	Humphrey Coliseum (4,953); Starkville, MS
12/19/2017*; 7:00 pm, ACCN Extra		at No. 14 Duke	L 39–69	6–6	Cameron Indoor Stadium (3,053); Durham, NC
12/28/2017*; 7:00 pm, ACCN Extra		at Boston College	W 61–40	7–6	Conte Forum (1,337); Chestnut Hill, MA
America East regular season
01/03/2018; 7:00 pm, ESPN3		Stony Brook	W 64–56	8–6 (1–0)	Cross Insurance Center (1,103); Bangor, ME
01/06/2018; 1:00 pm, ESPN3		Binghamton	L 62–66 ^{OT}	8–7 (1–1)	Cross Insurance Center (1,282); Bangor, ME
01/10/2018; 11:00 am, ESPN3		at UMBC	W 64–50	9–7 (2–1)	Retriever Activities Center (2,366); Catonsville, MD
01/13/2018; 2:00 pm, ESPN3		at Albany	L 54–68	9–8 (2–2)	SEFCU Arena (921); Albany, NY
01/15/2018; 1:00 pm, ESPN3		Vermont	W 64–55	10–8 (3–2)	Cross Insurance Center (1,584); Bangor, ME
01/18/2018; 7:00 pm, ESPN3		at Hartford	W 59–44	11–8 (4–2)	Chase Arena at Reich Family Pavilion (790); West Hartford, CT
01/24/2018; 7:00 pm, ESPN3		at New Hampshire	W 56–46	12–8 (5–2)	Lundholm Gym (348); Durham, NH
01/28/2018; 1:00 pm, ESPN3		UMBC	W 69–36	13–8 (6–2)	Cross Insurance Center (2,469); Bangor, ME
01/31/2018; 11:00 am, ESPN3		at UMass Lowell	W 69–51	14–8 (7–2)	Tsongas Center (4,125); Lowell, MA
02/03/2018; 1:00 pm, ESPN3		at Binghamton	W 61–38	15–8 (8–2)	Binghamton University Events Center (1,343); Vestal, NY
02/05/2018; 7:00 pm, ESPN3		Hartford	W 59–56	16–8 (9–2)	Cross Insurance Center (1,208); Bangor, ME
02/08/2018; 7:00 pm, ESPN3		New Hampshire	W 77–46	17–8 (10–2)	Cross Insurance Center (1,174); Bangor, ME
02/11/2018; 2:00 pm		at Stony Brook	L 68–76	17–9 (10–3)	Island Federal Credit Union Arena (1,107); Stony Brook, NY
02/14/2018; 7:00 pm, ESPN3		UMass Lowell	W 70–65	18–9 (11–3)	Cross Insurance Center (1,141); Bangor, ME
02/22/2018; 7:00 pm, ESPN3		at Vermont	W 79–47	19–9 (12–3)	Patrick Gym (505); Burlington, VT
02/25/2018; 1:00 pm, ESPN3		Albany	W 74–69 ^{OT}	20–9 (13–3)	Cross Insurance Center (3,140); Bangor, ME
America East Women's Tournament
03/03/2018; 12:00 pm, ESPN3	(1)	vs. (8) UMBC; Quarterfinals	W 65–43	21–9	Cross Insurance Arena (2,158); Portland, ME
03/04/2018; 2:00 pm, ESPN3	(1)	vs. (5) New Hampshire; Semifinals	W 64–48	22–9	Cross Insurance Arena; Portland, ME
03/09/2018; 4:00 pm, ESPNU	(1)	(6) Hartford; Championship Game	W 75–64	23–9	Cross Insurance Center (3,373); Bangor, ME
NCAA Women's Tournament
03/17/2018*; 6:00 pm, ESPN2	(15 KC)	at (2 KC) No. 8 Texas; First Round	L 54–83	23–10	Frank Erwin Center (3,878); Austin, TX
*Non-conference game. ^{#}Rankings from AP Poll. (#) Tournament seedings in parentheses. KC=Kansas City Region. All times are in Eastern Time.

== See also ==
- 2017–18 Maine Black Bears men's basketball team
