= 2017–18 Binghamton Bearcats women's basketball team =

American college basketball season

2017–18 Binghamton Bearcats women's basketball
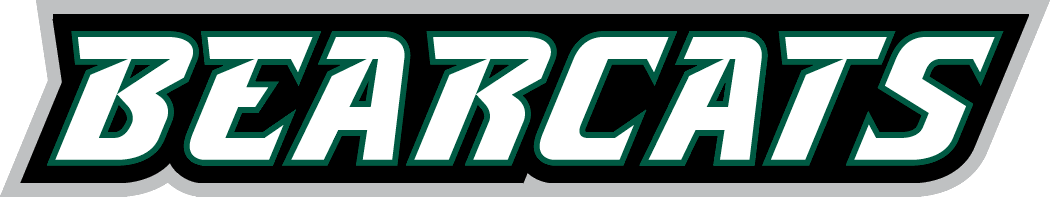

WBI, quarterfinals
- Conference: America East Conference
- Record: 20–12 (10–6 America East)
- Head coach: Linda Cimino (4th season)
- Assistant coaches: Leah Bowers; Chenel Harris-Smith; Kirsty Leedham
- Home arena: Binghamton University Events Center

2017–18 America East Conference women's basketball standings
	Conf.				Overall
Team	W		L	PCT	W		L	PCT
Maine †	13	–	3	.813	23	–	10	.697
Albany	12	–	4	.750	24	–	8	.750
Binghamton	10	–	6	.625	20	–	12	.625
Stony Brook	10	–	6	.625	18	–	12	.600
Hartford	9	–	7	.563	19	–	13	.594
New Hampshire	9	–	7	.563	19	–	12	.613
Vermont	5	–	11	.313	8	–	22	.267
UMBC	3	–	13	.188	5	–	26	.161
UMass Lowell	1	–	15	.063	4	–	26	.133
† 2018 America East tournament winner As of 20 March 2018; Rankings from AP poll

The 2017–18 Binghamton Bearcats women's basketball team represented Binghamton University during the 2017–18 NCAA Division I women's basketball season. The Bearcats, led by fourth-year head coach Linda Cimino, played their home games at Binghamton University Events Center in Binghamton, New York as members of the America East Conference. They finished the season 20–12, 10–6 in America East play. They earned a bye through the quarterfinals in the conference tournament, where they lost to Hartford in overtime. They received an invitation to play in the 2018 WBI, beating Youngstown State before losing to Yale in the quarterfinals.

On May 18, Cimino resigned to become a new head coach at St. Francis Brooklyn. She finished at Binghamton with a four-year record of 51–72.

== Media ==
All home games and conference road games streamed on either ESPN3 or AmericaEast.tv. Most road games stream on the opponent's website. All games were broadcast on the radio on WNBF and streamed online.

== Roster ==
2017–18 Binghamton Bearcats women's basketball team
Players
Coaches

Pos.	#	Name	Height	Year	Previous school	Hometown
G	3	Kai Moon	5 ft 6 in (1.68 m)	So	Nequa Valley	Bolingbrook, IL
F	5	Alyssa James	6 ft 1 in (1.85 m)	RS Sr	St. Mary's; Caldwell	Rosedale, NY
G	10	Jasmine Sina	5 ft 5 in (1.65 m)	RS Jr	Gill-St. Bernards	Lake Hopatcong, NJ
G	11	Imani Watkins	5 ft 8 in (1.73 m)	Sr	Wingate Andrews	High Point, NC
F	13	Kennedi Thompson	6 ft 0 in (1.83 m)	Jr	Gloucester Catholic	Mullica Hill, NJ
C	14	Payton Husson	6 ft 4 in (1.93 m)	So	Marysville	Marysville, MI
F	21	Karlee Krchnavi	6 ft 0 in (1.83 m)	So	Palisades	Quakertown, PA
F	22	Lizzy Spindler	5 ft 8 in (1.73 m)	Fr	Riverside	Taylor, PA
G	23	Bailey Williams	5 ft 10 in (1.78 m)	So	Dublin Jerome	Dublin, OH
C	24	Olivia Ramil (redshirt)	6 ft 2 in (1.88 m)	So	Binghamton; Georgetown	Binghamton, NY
F	31	Corrinne Godshall	5 ft 11 in (1.8 m)	RS So	Central Bucks West	Doylestown, PA
G	32	Carly Boland	6 ft 0 in (1.83 m)	So	Shenendehowa	Clifton Park, NY
G	33	Rebecca Carmody	5 ft 8 in (1.73 m)	Jr	Western Wayne	Waymart, PA
C	44	Jodi-Marie Ramil (redshirt)	6 ft 2 in (1.88 m)	Jr	Binghamton; Georgetown	Binghamton, NY
F	50	Kaylee Wasco	6 ft 3 in (1.91 m)	Fr	H.H. Dow	Midland, MI

Head coach

- Linda Cimino (Adelphi)

Assistant coach(es)

- Leah Bowers (Binghamton)
- Chenel Harris-Smith (Kent State)
- Kirsty Leedham (Caldwell)

Legend

- (C) Team captain
- (S) Suspended
- (I) Ineligible
- (W) Walk-on
- Injured
- Current redshirt

Roster
Last update: April 1, 2025

== Schedule ==
Date time, TV	Rank^{#}	Opponent^{#}	Result	Record	Site (attendance) city, state
Non-conference regular season
November 10, 2017*; 7:00 p.m.		at Army	L 61–73	0–1	Christl Arena (728); West Point, NY
November 13, 2017*; 7:00 p.m., ESPN3		SUNY Cortland	W 90–36	1–1	Binghamton University Events Center (1,239); Vestal, NY
November 15, 2017*; 7:00 p.m., ESPN3		Penn	W 77–72	2–1	Binghamton University Events Center (1,364); Vestal, NY
November 15, 2017*; 9:30 p.m.		at Southern Utah	W 72–66	3–1	America First Events Center (480); Cedar City, UT
November 21, 2017*; 9:30 p.m.		vs. Tulsa; Great Alaska Shootout quarterfinals	L 55–60	3–2	Alaska Airlines Center (1,700); Anchorage, AK
November 23, 2017*; 4:00 p.m.		vs. Maryland Eastern Shore; Great Alaska Shootout 3rd-place game	W 68–51	4–2	Alaska Airlines Center (1,652); Anchorage, AK
November 29, 2017*; 6:00 p.m.		at Bucknell	L 59–64	4–3	Sojka Pavilion (600); Lewisburg, PA
December 2, 2017*; 12:00 p.m., ESPN3		Yale	L 69–73 ^{OT}	4–4	Binghamton University Events Center (3,640); Vestal, NY
December 7, 2017*; 7:00 p.m.		at Bryant	W 57–47	5–4	Chace Athletic Center (584); Smithfield, RI
December 10, 2017*; 2:00 p.m., ESPN3		NJIT	W 67–36	6–4	Binghamton University Events Center (1,170); Vestal, NY
December 18, 2017*; 7:00 p.m.		at Cornell	W 66–58 ^{OT}	7–4	Newman Arena (229); Ithaca, NY
December 21, 2017*; 7:00 p.m.		at Rider	W 76–54	8–4	Alumni Gymnasium (714); Lawrenceville, NJ
December 31, 2017*; 2:00 p.m.		Dartmouth	W 80–64	9–4	Binghamton University Events Center (1,441); Vestal, NY
America East regular season
January 6, 2018; 1:00 p.m., ESPN3		at Maine	W 66–62	10–4 (1–0)	Cross Insurance Center (1,282); Bangor, ME
January 10, 2018; 7:00 p.m., ESPN3		New Hampshire	L 61–63	10–5 (1–1)	Binghamton University Events Center (1,523); Vestal, NY
January 13, 2018; 4:00 p.m., ESPN3		Hartford	W 64–59	11–5 (2–1)	Binghamton University Events Center (1,552); Vestal, NY
January 15, 2018; 2:00 p.m., ESPN3		at Albany	L 46–63	11–6 (2–2)	SEFCU Arena (1,084); Albany, NY
January 18, 2018; 7:00 p.m., ESPN3		Stony Brook	L 59–67	11–7 (2–3)	Binghamton University Events Center (1,432); Vestal, NY
January 21, 2018; 12:00 p.m., ESPN3		at UMass Lowell	L 59–67	12–7 (3–3)	Costello Athletic Center (364); Lowell, MA
January 24, 2018; 7:00 p.m., ESPN3		UMBC	W 81–51	13–7 (4–3)	Binghamton University Events Center (1,161); Vestal, NY
January 27, 2018; 7:00 p.m., ESPN3		at New Hampshire	W 54–52	14–7 (5–3)	Lundholm Gym (381); Durham, NH
January 31, 2018; 7:00 p.m., ESPN3		at Vermont	W 62–48	15–7 (6–3)	Patrick Gym (1,161); Burlington, VT
February 3, 2018; 1:00 p.m., ESPN3		Maine	L 38–61	15–8 (6–4)	Binghamton University Events Center (1,343); Vestal, NY
February 5, 2018; 7:00 p.m., ESPN3		at Stony Brook	W 69–64	16–8 (7–4)	Island Federal Credit Union Arena (562); Stony Brook, NY
February 8, 2018; 7:00 p.m., ESPN3		at UMBC	W 68–53	17–8 (8–4)	UMBC Event Center (518); Catonsville, MD
February 14, 2018; 7:00 p.m., ESPN3		Vermont	W 52–38	18–8 (9–4)	Binghamton University Events Center (1,173); Vestal, NY
February 17, 2018; 4:00 p.m., ESPN3		UMass Lowell	W 52–38	19–8 (10–4)	Binghamton University Events Center (2,001); Vestal, NY
February 22, 2018; 7:00 p.m., ESPN3		Albany	L 53–57	19–9 (10–5)	Binghamton University Events Center (1,672); Vestal, NY
February 25, 2018; 2:00 p.m., ESPN3		at Hartford	L 45–61	19–10 (10–6)	Chase Arena at Reich Family Pavilion (1,218); West Hartford, CT
America East women's tournament
March 3, 2018; 8:15 p.m., ESPN3	(3)	vs. (6) Hartford; Quarterfinals	L 68–72 ^{OT}	19–11	Cross Insurance Arena; Portland, ME
WBI
March 14, 2018*; 7:00 p.m.		at Youngstown State; First round	W 70–59	20–11	Beeghly Center (830); Youngstown, OH
March 20, 2018*; 7:00 p.m.		Yale; Second round	L 64–70	20–12	Binghamton University Events Center (703); Vestal, NY
*Non-conference game. ^{#}Rankings from AP poll. (#) Tournament seedings in parentheses. All times are in Eastern.

== See also ==
- 2017–18 Binghamton Bearcats men's basketball team
