= 2017–18 New Hampshire Wildcats women's basketball team =

Intercollegiate basketball season

2017–18 New Hampshire Wildcats women's basketball
- Conference: America East Conference
- Record: 19–12 (9–7 America East)
- Head coach: Maureen Magarity (8th season)
- Assistant coaches: Brendan Copes; Kelsey Hogan; Jade Singleton
- Home arena: Lundholm Gym

2017–18 America East Conference women's basketball standings
	Conf.				Overall
Team	W		L	PCT	W		L	PCT
Maine †	13	–	3	.813	23	–	10	.697
Albany	12	–	4	.750	24	–	8	.750
Binghamton	10	–	6	.625	20	–	12	.625
Stony Brook	10	–	6	.625	18	–	12	.600
Hartford	9	–	7	.563	19	–	13	.594
New Hampshire	9	–	7	.563	19	–	12	.613
Vermont	5	–	11	.313	8	–	22	.267
UMBC	3	–	13	.188	5	–	26	.161
UMass Lowell	1	–	15	.063	4	–	26	.133
† 2018 America East tournament winner As of 20 March 2018; Rankings from AP poll

The 2017–18 New Hampshire Wildcats women's basketball team represented the University of New Hampshire during the 2017–18 NCAA Division I women's basketball season. The Wildcats, led by eighth-year head coach Maureen Magarity, played their home games in Lundholm Gym and were members of the America East Conference.

== Media ==
All non-televised home games and conference road games were streamed on either ESPN3 or AmericaEast.tv. Select home games aired on Fox College Sports, Live Well Network, or WBIN. Most road games were streamed on the opponent's website. All conference home games and select non-conference home games were broadcast on the radio on WPKX and WGIR, and online on the New Hampshire Portal.

== Roster ==
2017–18 New Hampshire Wildcats women's basketball team
Players
Coaches

Pos.	#	Name	Height	Year	Previous school	Hometown
G	2	Brittni Lai	5 ft 6 in (1.68 m)	RS Sr	Irvington; Marist	Irvington, NY
G	3	Sarah Clement	5 ft 8 in (1.73 m)	So	Catherine McAuley	Falmouth, ME
G	5	Amanda Torres	5 ft 7 in (1.7 m)	Fr	Proctor Academy	Andover, NH
G	10	Aliza Simpson	5 ft 9 in (1.75 m)	Sr	Londonderry	Londonderry, NH
F/C	11	Ashley Storey	6 ft 3 in (1.91 m)	Jr	Greely	Cumberland, ME
G	12	Peyton Booth (C)	5 ft 10 in (1.78 m)	Sr	Wadsworth	Mansfield, OH
F	14	Maggie Ahearn (redshirt)	6 ft 2 in (1.88 m)	So	Tabor Academy; Providence	Marshfield, MA
G/F	21	Alli Gribbin	5 ft 11 in (1.8 m)	Jr	Keller	Keller, TX
G/F	24	Olivia Healy	5 ft 10 in (1.78 m)	RS Sr	Reading Memorial; Richmond	Reading, MA
G	25	Emily Peters	5 ft 6 in (1.68 m)	RS Jr	Forest Lake	Lindstrom, MN
C	32	Carlie Pogue	6 ft 2 in (1.88 m)	Sr	Princeton	Cincinnati, OH
G	33	Caroline Soucy	5 ft 9 in (1.75 m)	So	Marianapolis Prep	Beverly, MA
F	35	Kat Fogarty (C)	6 ft 2 in (1.88 m)	RS Sr	Pittsford Sutherland; Marist	Peterborough, NH
C	50	Morgan Bassett-Smith	6 ft 2 in (1.88 m)	Sr	Pickerington North	Pickerington, OH

Head coach

- Maureen Magarity (Marist)

Assistant coach(es)

- Brendan Copes (Marist)
- Kelsey Hogan (New Hampshire)
- Jade Singleton (Duquesne)

Legend

- (C) Team captain
- (S) Suspended
- (I) Ineligible
- (W) Walk-on
- Injured
- Current redshirt

Roster

== Schedule ==
Date time, TV	Rank^{#}	Opponent^{#}	Result	Record	Site (attendance) city, state
Non-conference regular season
11/11/2017*; 5:00 pm		at Xavier; Lauren Hill Tipoff Classic	L 66–71	0–1	Cintas Center (1,922); Cincinnati, OH
11/15/2017*; 7:00 pm, ESPN3		Boston University	W 72–57	1–1	Lundholm Gym (319); Durham, NH
11/18/2017*; 11:30 am		at Wagner	W 65–53	2–1	Spiro Sports Center (524); Staten Island, NY
11/21/2017*; 5:00 pm		at Bryant	W 74–65	3–1	Chace Athletic Center (328); Smithfield, RI
11/25/2017*; 4:30 pm		vs. La Salle; Christmas City Classic semifinals	L 51–59	3–2	Stabler Arena (671); Bethlehem, PA
11/26/2017*; 2:00 pm		vs. Fairfield; Christmas City Classic 3rd place game	W 71–61	4–2	Stabler Arena (460); Bethlehem, PA
11/29/2017*; 5:00 pm, ESPN3		Colby–Sawyer	W 64–40	5–2	Lundholm Gym (211); Durham, NH
12/01/2017*; 7:00 pm, ESPN3		Northeastern	W 65–50	6–2	Lundholm Gym (312); Durham, NH
11/05/2017*; 11:00 am		at Dartmouth; Rivalry	L 49–57	6–3	Leede Arena (1,170); Hanover, NH
12/09/2017*; 1:00 pm, ESPN3		Manhattan	W 68–55	7–3	Lundholm Gym (238); Durham, NH
12/17/2017*; 3:00 pm, ACCN Extra		at Boston College	L 55–64 ^{OT}	7–4	Conte Forum (1,041); Chestnut Hill, MA
12/20/2017*; 12:00 pm		at Sacred Heart	W 74–47	8–4	William H. Pitt Center (176); Fairfield, CT
12/29/2017*; 7:00 pm		Cornell	W 48–45	9–4	Lundholm Gym (273); Durham, NH
America East regular season
01/03/2018; 11:00 am, ESPN3		UMBC	W 56–51	10–4 (1–0)	Lundholm Gym (156); Durham, NH
01/06/2018; 7:00 pm, ESPN3		Albany	L 53–66	10–5 (1–1)	SEFCU Arena (921); Albany, NY
01/10/2018; 7:00 pm, ESPN3		Binghamton	W 63–61	11–5 (2–1)	Binghamton University Events Center (1,523); Vestal, NY
01/15/2018; 1:00 pm, ESPN3		UMass Lowell	W 66–45	12–5 (3–1)	Lundholm Gym (327); Durham, NH
01/18/2018; 7:00 pm, ESPN3		at Vermont	W 52–49	13–5 (4–1)	Patrick Gym (441); Burlington, VT
01/21/2018; 2:00 pm, ESPN3		at Stony Brook	W 51–50	14–5 (5–1)	Island Federal Credit Union Arena (1,120); Stony Brook, NY
01/24/2018; 7:00 pm, ESPN3		at Maine	L 46–56	14–6 (5–2)	Lundholm Gym (348); Burlington, VT
01/27/2018; 1:00 pm, ESPN3		Binghamton	L 52–54	14–7 (5–3)	Lundholm Gym (381); Durham, NH
01/31/2018; 7:00 pm, ESPN3		at Hartford	L 49–85	14–8 (5–4)	Chase Arena at Reich Family Pavilion (1,151); West Hartford, CT
02/03/2018; 1:00 pm, ESPN3		Albany	W 74–68	15–8 (6–4)	Lundholm Gym (451); Durham, NH
02/05/2018; 7:00 pm, ESPN3		Vermont	L 53–58	15–9 (6–5)	Lundholm Gym (303); Durham, NH
02/08/2018; 7:00 pm, ESPN3		at Maine	L 46–77	15–10 (6–6)	Cross Insurance Center (1,174); Bangor, ME
02/11/2018; 1:00 pm, ESPN3		at UMBC	W 51–46	16–10 (7–6)	UMBC Event Center (220); Catonsville, MD
02/14/2018; 11:00 am, ESPN3		Hartford	W 76–58	17–10 (8–6)	Lundholm Gym (1,337); Durham, NH
02/17/2018; 1:00 pm, ESPN3		Stony Brook	L 56–62	17–11 (8–7)	Lundholm Gym (441); Durham, NH
02/22/2018; 7:00 pm, ESPN3		at UMass Lowell	W 70–49	18–11 (9–7)	Tsongas Center (1,153); Lowell, MA
America East Women's Tournament
03/03/2018; 2:15 pm, ESPN3	(5)	vs. (4) Stony Brook; Quarterfinals	W 71–54	19–11	Cross Insurance Arena (2,158); Portland, ME
03/04/2018; 2:00 pm, ESPN3	(5)	vs. (1) Maine; Semifinals	L 48–64	19–12	Cross Insurance Arena; Portland, ME
*Non-conference game. ^{#}Rankings from AP Poll. (#) Tournament seedings in parentheses. All times are in Eastern Time.

== Rankings ==
+ Regular season polls	Poll	Pre- season	Week 2	Week 3	Week 4	Week 5	Week 6	Week 7	Week 8	Week 9	Week 10	Week 11	Week 12	Week 13	Week 14	Week 15	Week 16	Week 17	Week 18	Week 19	Final
AP																				N/A	
Coaches																					

Legend
	Increase in ranking
	Decrease in ranking
	No change
(RV)	Received votes

== See also ==
- 2017–18 New Hampshire Wildcats men's basketball team
