= 2017–18 UMBC Retrievers women's basketball team =

Intercollegiate basketball season

2017–18 UMBC Retrievers women's basketball
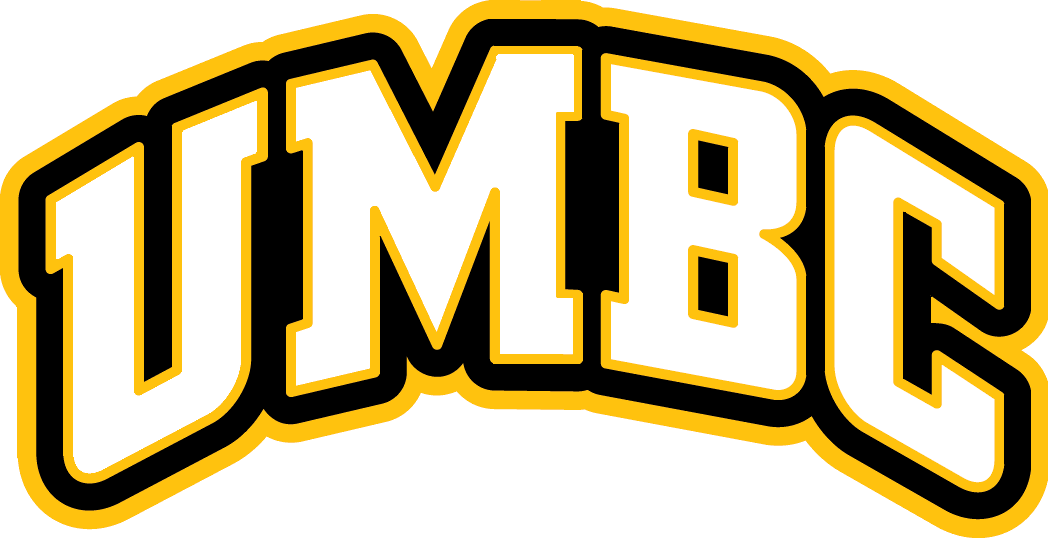
- Conference: America East Conference
- Record: 5–26 (3–13 America East)
- Head coach: Phil Stern (16th season)
- Assistant coaches: Carlee Cassidy-Dewey; Chelsea Barker Walsh; Courtnay Pilypaitis
- Home arena: Retriever Activities Center; UMBC Event Center

2017–18 America East Conference women's basketball standings
	Conf.				Overall
Team	W		L	PCT	W		L	PCT
Maine †	13	–	3	.813	23	–	10	.697
Albany	12	–	4	.750	24	–	8	.750
Binghamton	10	–	6	.625	20	–	12	.625
Stony Brook	10	–	6	.625	18	–	12	.600
Hartford	9	–	7	.563	19	–	13	.594
New Hampshire	9	–	7	.563	19	–	12	.613
Vermont	5	–	11	.313	8	–	22	.267
UMBC	3	–	13	.188	5	–	26	.161
UMass Lowell	1	–	15	.063	4	–	26	.133
† 2018 America East tournament winner As of 20 March 2018; Rankings from AP poll

The 2017–18 UMBC Retrievers women's basketball team represented the University of Maryland, Baltimore County during the 2017–18 NCAA Division I women's basketball season. The Retrievers, led by sixteenth-year head coach Phil Stern, were members of the America East Conference, They began the season playing home games in the Retriever Activities Center before the opening of the new UMBC Event Center on February 3, 2018. The women's first game in the new arena was on February 8 against Binghamton.

== Media ==
All non-televised home games and conference road games were streamed on either ESPN3 or AmericaEast.tv. Most road games were streamed on the opponent's website. Select games were broadcast on the radio on WQLL-1370 AM.

== Roster ==
2017–18 UMBC Retrievers women's basketball team
Players
Coaches

Pos.	#	Name	Height	Year	Previous school	Hometown
F	1	Janee'a Summers	5 ft 11 in (1.8 m)	Fr	Bound Brook	Bound Brook, NJ
G	2	O'lesheya Braxton	5 ft 11 in (1.8 m)	Fr	Paterson Kennedy	Paterson, NJ
G	3	Te'yJah Oliver	5 ft 8 in (1.73 m)	So	Riverdale Baptist	Clinton, MD
F	10	Chukwuma Chiamaka	5 ft 11 in (1.8 m)	Sr	Eastern Arizona College	Lagos, Nigeria
F	13	Jen Gast	6 ft 2 in (1.88 m)	Fr	Catonsville	Baltimore, MD
G	21	Carly Harris	5 ft 6 in (1.68 m)	Sr	Shaler Area	Glenshaw, PA
F	23	Kristen Teklits	5 ft 10 in (1.78 m)	Fr	New Fairfield	New Fairfield, CT
F/C	24	Lucrezia Costa	6 ft 2 in (1.88 m)	So	Liceo Classico Enrico Perito	Rome, Italy
G	25	Laura Castaldo	5 ft 8 in (1.73 m)	Sr	Clarkstown South	West Nyack, NY
G	31	Brittany Burgess	6 ft 0 in (1.83 m)	RS Sr	St. Mary's Ryken; VCU	White Plains, MD
G	35	Allison McGrath	5 ft 10 in (1.78 m)	So	South Park	South Park, PA
G	42	Tyler Moore	5 ft 9 in (1.75 m)	So	Norfolk Academy	Portsmouth, VA
F	44	Kayla Hinderlie	6 ft 2 in (1.88 m)	So	Edmund Burke School	Silver Spring, MD
F	45	Lakiah Sims	6 ft 1 in (1.85 m)	Sr	Charles Drew; Palm Beach State	Riverdale, GA

Head coach

- Phil Stern (Concordia (NY))

Assistant coach(es)

- Carlee Cassidy-Dewey (UMBC)
- Chelsea Barker Walsh (UMBC)
- Courtnay Pilypaitis (Vermont)

Legend

- (C) Team captain
- (S) Suspended
- (I) Ineligible
- (W) Walk-on
- Injured
- Current redshirt

Roster

== Schedule ==
Date time, TV	Rank^{#}	Opponent^{#}	Result	Record	Site (attendance) city, state
Non-conference regular season
11/10/2017*; 5:00 pm		at Fordham	L 46–55	0–1	Rose Hill Gymnasium (1,923); Bronx, NY
11/12/2017*; 2:00 pm		at Hofstra	L 55–71	0–2	Hofstra Arena (323); Hempstead, NY
11/14/2017*; 7:00 pm, ESPN3		Gettysburg	W 72–45	1–2	Retriever Activities Center (382); Catonsville, MD
11/17/2017*; 7:00 pm, ESPN3		LIU Brooklyn	L 52–66	1–3	Retriever Activities Center (341); Catonsville, MD
11/21/2017*; 11:00 am		at Towson	L 64–95	1–4	SECU Arena (3,100); Towson, MD
11/25/2017*; 1:00 pm		vs. St. Bonaventure; Navy Classic semifinals	L 53–64	1–5	Alumni Hall (378); Annapolis, MD
11/26/2017*; 1:00 pm		vs. North Dakota State; Navy Classic 3rd place game	L 53–67	1–6	Alumni Hall (215); Annapolis, MD
11/29/2017*; 7:00 pm, ESPN3		American	L 48–61	1–7	Retriever Activities Center (320); Catonsville, MD
12/03/2017*; 1:00 pm, ESPN3		Columbia	L 44–60	1–8	Retriever Activities Center (318); Catonsville, MD
12/07/2017*; 7:00 pm, ESPN3		Denver	L 48–70	1–9	Retriever Activities Center (266); Catonsville, MD
12/11/2017*; 7:00 pm		at George Mason	L 38–58	1–10	EagleBank Arena (527); Fairfax, VA
12/21/2017*; 6:00 pm		at Maryland Eastern Shore	L 43–66	1–11	Hytche Athletic Center (322); Princess Anne, MD
12/30/2017*; 4:00 pm		at Princeton	L 44–70	1–12	Jadwin Gymnasium (828); Princeton, NJ
America East regular season
01/03/2018; 11:00 am, ESPN3		at New Hampshire	L 51–56	1–13 (0–1)	Lundholm Gym (156); Durham, NH
01/06/2018; 7:00 pm, ESPN3		Vermont	L 58–72	1–14 (0–2)	Retriever Activities Center (291); Catonsville, MD
01/10/2018; 11:00 am, ESPN3		Maine	L 50–65	1–15 (0–3)	Retriever Activities Center (2,366); Catonsville, MD
01/13/2018; 1:00 pm, ESPN3		UMass Lowell	W 66–54	2–15 (1–3)	Retriever Activities Center (291); Catonsville, MD
01/15/2018; 1:00 pm, ESPN3		at Hartford	L 54–65	2–16 (1–4)	Chase Arena at Reich Family Pavilion (1,005); Hartford, CT
01/21/2018; 1:00 pm, ESPN3		Albany	L 75–78	2–17 (1–5)	Retriever Activities Center (281); Catonsville, MD
01/24/2018; 7:00 pm, ESPN3		at Binghamton	L 51–81	2–18 (1–6)	Binghamton University Events Center (1,151); Vestal, NY
01/31/2018; 7:00 pm		Stony Brook	L 44–69	2–19 (1–7)	Retriever Activities Center (324); Catonsville, MD
01/28/2018; 1:00 pm, ESPN3		at Maine	L 36–69	2–20 (1–8)	Cross Insurance Center (2,469); Bangor, ME
02/03/2018; 7:00 pm, ESPN3		Vermont	W 52–51	3–20 (2–8)	Patrick Gym (156); Burlington, VT
02/08/2018; 7:00 pm		Binghamton	L 53–68	3–21 (2–9)	UMBC Event Center (518); Catonsville, MD
02/11/2018; 1:00 pm, ESPN3		New Hampshire	L 46–51	3–22 (2–10)	UMBC Event Center (220); Catonsville, MD
02/14/2018; 7:00 pm, ESPN3		at Stony Brook	L 49–53	3–23 (2–11)	Binghamton University Events Center (267); Stony Brook, NY
02/17/2018; 1:00 pm, ESPN3		at Albany	L 45–79	3–24 (2–12)	SEFCU Arena (1,158); Albany, NY
02/22/2018; 7:00 pm, ESPN3		Hartford	L 54–61	3–25 (2–13)	UMBC Event Center (203); Catonsville, MD
02/25/2018; 1:00 pm, ESPN3		at UMass Lowell	W 61–39	4–25 (3–13)	Costello Athletic Center (891); Lowell, MA
America East Women's Tournament
02/28/2018; 6:00 pm, ESPN3	(9)	(8) UMass Lowell; First Round	W 73–65	5–25	UMBC Event Center (281); Catonsville, MD
02/28/2018; 6:00 pm, ESPN3	(9)	vs. (1) Maine; Quarterfinals	L 43–65	5–26	Cross Insurance Arena (2,158); Portland, ME
*Non-conference game. ^{#}Rankings from AP Poll. (#) Tournament seedings in parentheses. All times are in Eastern Time.

== See also ==
- 2017–18 UMBC Retrievers men's basketball team
