= 2017–18 Hartford Hawks women's basketball team =

Intercollegiate basketball season

2017–18 Hartford Hawks women's basketball
- Conference: America East Conference
- Record: 19–13 (9–7 America East)
- Head coach: Kim McNeill (2nd season)
- Assistant coaches: Cory McNeill; Steve Pogue; Ali Heller
- Home arena: Chase Arena at Reich Family Pavilion

2017–18 America East Conference women's basketball standings
	Conf.				Overall
Team	W		L	PCT	W		L	PCT
Maine †	13	–	3	.813	23	–	10	.697
Albany	12	–	4	.750	24	–	8	.750
Binghamton	10	–	6	.625	20	–	12	.625
Stony Brook	10	–	6	.625	18	–	12	.600
Hartford	9	–	7	.563	19	–	13	.594
New Hampshire	9	–	7	.563	19	–	12	.613
Vermont	5	–	11	.313	8	–	22	.267
UMBC	3	–	13	.188	5	–	26	.161
UMass Lowell	1	–	15	.063	4	–	26	.133
† 2018 America East tournament winner As of 20 March 2018; Rankings from AP poll

The 2017–18 Hartford Hawks women's basketball team represented the University of Hartford during the 2017–18 NCAA Division I women's basketball season. The Hawks, led by second year head coach Kim McNeill and played their home games in the Chase Arena at Reich Family Pavilion and were members of the America East Conference.

== Media ==
All home games and conference road games will stream on either ESPN3 or AmericaEast.tv. Most road games will stream on the opponents website. All games will be broadcast on the radio on WWUH.

== Roster ==
2017–18 Hartford Hawks women's basketball team
Players
Coaches

Pos.	#	Name	Height	Year	Previous school	Hometown
G	2	Sierra DaCoasta	5 ft 9 in (1.75 m)	So	Bishop McDevitt	Philadelphia, PA
G	3	Jada Lucas	5 ft 5 in (1.65 m)	Fr	New London	New London, CT
G	4	Jade Young	5 ft 11 in (1.8 m)	Fr	Abington Friends School	Philadelphia, PA
G	5	Lindsey Abed	5 ft 6 in (1.68 m)	Jr	Oakton	Oakton, VA
G	10	Mary Pattison	5 ft 9 in (1.75 m)	Sr	Troy	Troy, NY
G	11	Liz Garcia	5 ft 10 in (1.78 m)	Fr	Academy of the Holy Angels	Teaneck, NJ
G/F	12	Courtney Dobrzynski	6 ft 0 in (1.83 m)	Fr	Saint John Vianney	Bradley Beach, NJ
G/F	13	Kelly Douglass	5 ft 10 in (1.78 m)	Jr	Clifton	Clifton, NJ
F	15	Darby Lee	6 ft 0 in (1.83 m)	Sr	Altoona Area	Altoona, PA
C	20	Musharapha Alhassan	6 ft 4 in (1.93 m)	Fr	St. Vincent Palotti	Upper Marlboro, MD
G	23	Alexia Douglas	5 ft 7 in (1.7 m)	Jr	Brentwood; ASA Junior College	Bay Shore, NY
F	33	Janelle Harrison	6 ft 0 in (1.83 m)	Sr	Cromwell	Cromwell, CT
F/C	44	Brielle Wilborn	6 ft 3 in (1.91 m)	Fr	Middletown	Middletown, CT

Head coach

- Kim McNeill (Richmond)

Assistant coach(es)

- Cory McNeill (Morgan State)
- Steve Pogue (Nyack)
- Ali Heller (Rider)

Legend

- (C) Team captain
- (S) Suspended
- (I) Ineligible
- (W) Walk-on
- Injured
- Current redshirt

Roster
Last update: September 9, 2017

== Schedule ==
Date time, TV	Rank^{#}	Opponent^{#}	Result	Record	Site (attendance) city, state
Non-conference regular season
11/10/2017*; 5:30 pm, ESPN3		Villanova	L 53–71	0–1	Chase Arena at Reich Family Pavilion; West Hartford, CT
11/13/2017*; 7:00 pm, ESPN3		Delaware	L 63–72	0–2	Chase Arena at Reich Family Pavilion (714); West Hartford, CT
11/18/2017*; 2:00 pm, ESPN3		Hofstra	W 60–49	1–2	Chase Arena at Reich Family Pavilion (907); West Hartford, CT
11/20/2017*; 11:00 am, ACCN Extra		at Syracuse	L 63–75	1–3	Carrier Dome (5,144); Syracuse, NY
11/25/2017*; 2:00 pm		vs. Charleston Southern; 2017 Thanksgiving Tournament	W 62–43	2–3	FIU Arena (421); Miami, FL
11/26/2017*; 12:00 pm		vs. Alabama A&M; 2017 Thanksgiving Tournament	W 56–47	3–3	FIU Arena (364); Miami, FL
12/01/2017*; 3:00 pm, ACCN Extra		at North Carolina	L 70–90	3–4	Carmichael Arena (1,960); Chapel Hill, NC
12/03/2017*; 4:00 pm, ESPN3		Niagara	W 83–65	4–4	Chase Arena at Reich Family Pavilion (867); West Hartford, CT
12/06/2017*; 7:00 pm, ESPN3		Central Connecticut; Rivalry	W 68–52	5–4	Chase Arena at Reich Family Pavilion (746); West Hartford, CT
12/10/2017*; 1:00 pm		at Bryant	W 59–47	6–4	Chace Athletic Center (398); Smithfield, RI
12/21/2017*; 11:00 am, ESPN3		Siena	W 71–62	7–4	Chase Arena at Reich Family Pavilion (1,324); West Hartford, CT
12/28/2017*; 1:00 pm		at Fordham; Fordham Holiday Classic semifinals	L 44–69	7–5	Rose Hill Gymnasium (832); Bronx, NY
12/28/2017*; 1:00 pm		vs. Yale; Fordham Holiday Classic 3rd place game	W 78–70	8–5	Rose Hill Gymnasium (862); Bronx, NY
America East regular season
01/03/2018; 7:00 pm, ESPN3		Albany	W 70–55	9–5 (1–0)	Chase Arena at Reich Family Pavilion (722); West Hartford, CT
01/06/2018; 2:00 pm, ESPN3		at Stony Brook	W 75–68	10–5 (2–0)	Island Federal Credit Union Arena (537); Stony Brook, NY
01/10/2018; 7:00 pm, ESPN3		at UMass Lowell	W 81–42	11–5 (3–0)	Tsongas Center (421); Lowell, MA
01/13/2018; 4:00 pm, ESPN3		at Binghamton	L 59–64	11–6 (3–1)	Binghamton University Events Center (1,552); Vestal, NY
01/15/2018; 1:00 pm, ESPN3		UMBC	W 65–54	12–6 (4–1)	Chase Arena at Reich Family Pavilion (1,005); West Hartford, CT
01/18/2018; 1:00 pm, ESPN3		Maine	L 44–59	12–7 (4–2)	Chase Arena at Reich Family Pavilion (790); West Hartford, CT
01/21/2018; 2:00 pm, ESPN3		at Vermont	L 47–53	12–8 (4–3)	Patrick Gym (352); Burlington, VT
01/27/2018; 2:00 pm, ESPN3		UMass Lowell	W 78–56	13–8 (5–3)	Chase Arena at Reich Family Pavilion (1,031); West Hartford, CT
01/31/2018; 7:00 pm, ESPN3		New Hampshire	W 85–49	14–8 (6–3)	Chase Arena at Reich Family Pavilion (1,151); West Hartford, CT
02/03/2018; 2:00 pm		Stony Brook	L 58–66	14–9 (6–4)	Chase Arena at Reich Family Pavilion (722); West Hartford, CT
02/05/2018; 7:00 pm, ESPN3		at Maine	L 56–59	14–10 (6–5)	Cross Insurance Center (1,208); Bangor, ME
02/11/2018; 2:00 pm		at Albany	L 53–66	14–11 (6–6)	SEFCU Arena (1,377); Albany, NY
02/14/2018; 11:00 am, ESPN3		at New Hampshire	L 58–76	14–12 (6–7)	Lundholm Gym (1,337); Durham, NH
02/17/2018; 2:00 pm, ESPN3		Vermont	W 91–52	15–12 (7–7)	Chase Arena at Reich Family Pavilion (1,281); West Hartford, CT
02/22/2018; 7:00 pm, ESPN3		at UMBC	W 61–54	16–12 (8–7)	UMBC Event Center (203); Catonsville, MD
02/25/2018; 2:00 pm, ESPN3		Binghamton	W 61–45	17–12 (9–7)	Chase Arena at Reich Family Pavilion (1,218); West Hartford, CT
America East Women's Tournament
03/03/2018; 8:15 pm, ESPN3	(6)	vs. (3) Binghamton; Quarterfinals	W 72–68 ^{OT}	18–12	Cross Insurance Arena; Portland, ME
03/04/2018; 4:00 pm, ESPN3	(6)	vs. (2) Albany; Semifinals	W 58–56	19–12	Cross Insurance Arena; Portland, ME
03/09/2018; 4:00 pm, ESPNU	(6)	at (1) Maine; Championship Game	L 64–75	19–13	Cross Insurance Center; Bangor, ME
*Non-conference game. ^{#}Rankings from AP Poll. (#) Tournament seedings in parentheses. All times are in Eastern Time.

== See also ==
- 2017–18 Hartford Hawks men's basketball team
