= 2017–18 Albany Great Danes women's basketball team =

Intercollegiate basketball season

2017–18 Albany Great Danes women's basketball

WNIT, First Round
- Conference: America East Conference
- Record: 24–8 (12–4 America East)
- Head coach: Joanna Bernabei-McNamee (2nd season)
- Assistant coaches: Yolanda Griffith; AJ Cohen; Tony Perotti
- Home arena: SEFCU Arena

2017–18 America East Conference women's basketball standings
	Conf.				Overall
Team	W		L	PCT	W		L	PCT
Maine †	13	–	3	.813	23	–	10	.697
Albany	12	–	4	.750	24	–	8	.750
Binghamton	10	–	6	.625	20	–	12	.625
Stony Brook	10	–	6	.625	18	–	12	.600
Hartford	9	–	7	.563	19	–	13	.594
New Hampshire	9	–	7	.563	19	–	12	.613
Vermont	5	–	11	.313	8	–	22	.267
UMBC	3	–	13	.188	5	–	26	.161
UMass Lowell	1	–	15	.063	4	–	26	.133
† 2018 America East tournament winner As of 20 March 2018; Rankings from AP poll

The 2017–18 Albany Great Danes women's basketball team represented the University at Albany, SUNY during the 2017–18 NCAA Division I women's basketball season. The Great Danes, led by second-year head coach Joanna Bernabei-McNamee, played their home games at SEFCU Arena and were members of the America East Conference. They finished the season 24–8, 12–4 in America East play to finish in second place. They advanced to the semifinals of the America East women's tournament, where they lost to Hartford. They received an automatic bid to the Women's National Invitation Tournament, where they lost to Penn in the first round.

Bernabei-McNamee left Albany on April 10 after two seasons for Boston College. On May 14, former Army assistant head coach Colleen Mullen was named the new head coach for the Great Danes.

== Media ==
All home games and conference road games were streamed on either ESPN3 on AmericaEast.tv. Most road games were streamed on the opponent's website. Selected games were broadcast on the radio on WCDB.

== Roster ==
2017–18 Albany Great Danes women's basketball team
Players
Coaches

Pos.	#	Name	Height	Year	Previous school	Hometown
G	00	Mackenzie Trpcic	5 ft 6 in (1.68 m)	So	St. Mary's	Hamilton, ON
G	2	Kyara Frames	5 ft 2 in (1.57 m)	Fr	Bishop McNamara	Laurel, MD
G	3	Khepera Stokes	5 ft 6 in (1.68 m)	RS So	Baltimore Polytechnic Institute	Baltimore, MD
G	4	De'jah Williams	5 ft 11 in (1.8 m)	Fr	Imhotep Charter School	Philadelphia, PA
G	10	Patricia Conroy	5 ft 9 in (1.75 m)	Fr	St. Joseph Hill Academy	Staten Island, NY
F	13	Bose Aiyalogbe	6 ft 0 in (1.83 m)	RS Sr	Life Center Academy	Lagos, Nigeria
F	14	Amanda Kantzy (redshirt)	6 ft 3 in (1.91 m)	Jr	Luleå Basketgymnasium; Colorado State	Spånga, Sweden
G/F	15	Jessica Féquière	5 ft 11 in (1.8 m)	RS Sr	Champlain College Saint-Lambert	Montreal, QE
G	20	Kumsal Aslan	5 ft 8 in (1.73 m)	So	St. Timothy's School	Ankara, Turkey
F	22	Heather Forster	6 ft 2 in (1.88 m)	Jr	Huntington	Huntington, NY
C	24	Alexi Schecter	6 ft 3 in (1.91 m)	So	Lowell	Lowell, MA
G	32	Emma List	5 ft 10 in (1.78 m)	Fr	Discovery Canyon Campus	Colorado Springs, CO
F/C	33	Tiana-Jo Carter	6 ft 2 in (1.88 m)	Jr	Lake Region	Naples, ME
G/F	34	CeCe Mayo	5 ft 9 in (1.75 m)	Fr	Shaker	Latham, NY
F	44	Chyanna Canada	6 ft 2 in (1.88 m)	Jr	Nottingham	Syracuse, NY

Head coach

- Joanna Bernabei-McNamee (West Liberty)

Assistant coach(es)

- Yolanda Griffith (Florida Atlantic)
- AJ Cohen (Louisville)
- Tony Perotti (Tennessee)

Legend

- (C) Team captain
- (S) Suspended
- (I) Ineligible
- (W) Walk-on
- Injured
- Current redshirt

Roster

== Schedule ==
Date time, TV	Rank^{#}	Opponent^{#}	Result	Record	Site (attendance) city, state
Non-conference regular season
11/10/2017*; 7:00 pm		at No. 15 Maryland	L 58–91	0–1	Xfinity Center (4,021); College Park, MD
11/16/2017*; 7:00 pm, ESPN3		at Monmouth	W 68–44	1–1	OceanFirst Bank Center (365); West Long Branch, NJ
11/19/2017*; 2:00 pm, ESPN3		Fordham	W 59–52 ^{OT}	2–1	SEFCU Arena (1,209); Albany, NY
11/22/2017*; 7:00 pm, ESPN3		Wagner	W 89–44	3–1	SEFCU Arena (889); Albany, NY
11/27/2017*; 7:00 pm		at Central Connecticut	W 72–60	4–1	William H. Detrick Gymnasium (647); New Britain, CT
11/30/2017*; 7:00 pm, ESPN3		St. John's	L 66–71	4–2	SEFCU Arena (913); Albany, NY
12/03/2017*; 12:00 pm		at Holy Cross	W 65–56	5–2	Hart Center (965); Worcester, MA
12/06/2017*; 7:00 pm		at Manhattan	W 62–56	6–2	Draddy Gymnasium (137); Riverdale, NY
12/09/2017*; 5:00 pm		at Siena; Albany Cup	W 78–63	7–2	Times Union Center (1,502); Albany, NY
12/17/2017*; 2:00 pm, ESPN3		St. Bonaventure	W 69–52	8–2	SEFCU Arena (979); Albany, NY
12/19/2017*; 1:00 pm		vs. Southern Illinois; Puerto Rico Classic	W 68–57	9–2	Coliseo Rubén Zayas Montañez (105); San Juan, PR
12/21/2017*; 1:00 pm		vs. Northern Illinois; Puerto Rico Classic	W 97–91 ^{OT}	10–2	Coliseo Rubén Zayas Montañez (122); San Juan, PR
12/30/2017*; 2:00 pm, ESPN3		Dartmouth	W 76–61	11–2	SEFCU Arena (1,036); Albany, NY
America East regular season
01/03/2018; 7:00 pm, ESPN3		at Hartford	L 55–70	11–3 (0–1)	Chase Arena at Reich Family Pavilion (722); West Hartford, CT
01/06/2018; 2:00 pm, ESPN3		New Hampshire	W 66–53	12–3 (1–1)	SEFCU Arena (921); Albany, NY
01/10/2018; 7:00 pm, ESPN3		at Stony Brook	W 72–68 ^{OT}	13–3 (2–1)	Island Federal Credit Union Arena (502); Stony Brook, NY
01/13/2018; 2:00 pm, ESPN3		Maine	W 68–54	14–3 (3–1)	SEFCU Arena (921); Albany, NY
01/15/2018; 2:00 pm, ESPN3		Binghamton	W 63–46	15–3 (4–1)	SEFCU Arena (1,084); Albany, NY
01/18/2018; 7:00 pm, ESPN3		at UMass Lowell	W 61–52	16–3 (5–1)	Tsongas Center (632); Lowell, MA
01/21/2018; 1:00 pm, ESPN3		at UMBC	W 78–75	17–3 (6–1)	Retriever Activities Center (281); Catonsville, MD
01/24/2018; 11:00 am, ESPN3		Vermont	W 67–55	18–3 (7–1)	SEFCU Arena (2,248); Albany, NY
01/27/2018; 2:00 pm, ESPN3		Stony Brook	W 64–58	19–3 (8–1)	SEFCU Arena (1,188); Albany, NY
02/03/2018; 1:00 pm, ESPN3		at New Hampshire	L 68–74	19–4 (8–2)	Lundholm Gym (451); Durham, NH
02/05/2018; 7:00 pm, ESPN3		UMass Lowell	W 93–60	20–4 (9–2)	SEFCU Arena (903); Albany, NY
02/08/2018; 7:00 pm, ESPN3		at Vermont	L 57–62	20–5 (9–3)	Patrick Gym (336); Burlington, VT
02/11/2018; 2:00 pm, ESPN3		Hartford	W 66–53	21–5 (10–3)	SEFCU Arena (1,377); Albany, NY
02/17/2018; 2:00 pm, ESPN3		UMBC	W 79–45	22–5 (11–3)	SEFCU Arena (1,158); Albany, NY
02/22/2018; 7:00 pm, ESPN3		at Binghamton	W 57–53	23–5 (12–3)	Binghamton University Events Center (1,672); Vestal, NY
02/25/2018; 1:00 pm, ESPN3		at Maine	L 69–74 ^{OT}	23–6 (12–4)	Cross Insurance Center (3,140); Bangor, ME
America East Women's Tournament
03/03/2018; 6:00 pm, ESPN3	(2)	vs. (7) Vermont; Quarterfinals	W 60–42	24–6	Cross Insurance Arena; Portland, ME
03/04/2018; 4:30 pm, ESPN3	(2)	vs. (6) Hartford; Semifinals	L 56–58	24–7	Cross Insurance Arena; Portland, ME
WNIT
03/16/2018*; 7:00 pm		at Penn; First Round	L 61–76	24–8	Palestra (609); Philadelphia, PA
*Non-conference game. ^{#}Rankings from AP Poll. (#) Tournament seedings in parentheses. All times are in Eastern Time.

== Rankings ==
+ Regular season polls	Poll	Pre- season	Week 2	Week 3	Week 4	Week 5	Week 6	Week 7	Week 8	Week 9	Week 10	Week 11	Week 12	Week 13	Week 14	Week 15	Week 16	Week 17	Week 18	Week 19	Final
AP																				N/A	
Coaches																					

Legend
	Increase in ranking
	Decrease in ranking
	No change
(RV)	Received votes
(NR)	Not ranked

== See also ==
- 2017–18 Albany Great Danes men's basketball team
