= 2017–18 Vermont Catamounts women's basketball team =

Intercollegiate basketball season

2017–18 Vermont Catamounts women's basketball
- Conference: America East Conference
- Record: 8–22 (5–11 America East)
- Head coach: Chris Day (2nd season)
- Assistant coaches: Alisa Kresge; Dominique Bryant; Stefanie Murphy
- Home arena: Patrick Gym

2017–18 America East Conference women's basketball standings
	Conf.				Overall
Team	W		L	PCT	W		L	PCT
Maine †	13	–	3	.813	23	–	10	.697
Albany	12	–	4	.750	24	–	8	.750
Binghamton	10	–	6	.625	20	–	12	.625
Stony Brook	10	–	6	.625	18	–	12	.600
Hartford	9	–	7	.563	19	–	13	.594
New Hampshire	9	–	7	.563	19	–	12	.613
Vermont	5	–	11	.313	8	–	22	.267
UMBC	3	–	13	.188	5	–	26	.161
UMass Lowell	1	–	15	.063	4	–	26	.133
† 2018 America East tournament winner As of 20 March 2018; Rankings from AP poll

The 2017–18 Vermont Catamounts women's basketball team represented the University of Vermont during the 2017–18 NCAA Division I women's basketball season. The Catamounts, led by second year head coach Chris Day, played their home games in the Patrick Gym and were members in the America East Conference.

== Media ==
All non-televised home games and conference road games will stream on either ESPN3 or AmericaEast.tv. Select home games will be televised by the Northeast Sports Network. Most road games will stream on the opponents website. All games will be broadcast on WVMT 620 AM and streamed online through SportsJuice.com with Rob Ryan calling the action.

== Roster ==
2017–18 Vermont Catamounts women's basketball team
Players
Coaches

Pos.	#	Name	Height	Year	Previous school	Hometown
G	1	Dani Lozzi	5 ft 10 in (1.78 m)	Fr	The College of Richard Collyer	Horsham, England
G	2	Josie Larkins	5 ft 9 in (1.75 m)	Fr	Red Bank Catholic	Lincroft, NJ
G	3	Sydney Smith (C)	5 ft 11 in (1.8 m)	Sr	Vernon Hills	Vernon Hills, IL
G	4	Hayley Robertson	5 ft 8 in (1.73 m)	Jr	Bill Crothers Secondary	Toronto, ON
G	5	Kianna Funderburk	5 ft 9 in (1.75 m)	Fr	Myers Park	Charlotte, NC
F	10	Hanna Crymble	6 ft 3 in (1.91 m)	So	Champlin Park	Champlin, MN
F	11	Candice Wright	6 ft 3 in (1.91 m)	Jr	Jacob Hespeler	Cambridge, ON
G	12	Katie Lavelle (C)	5 ft 9 in (1.75 m)	Sr	Long Island Lutheran	Hicksville, NY
G	13	Kristina White	5 ft 8 in (1.73 m)	RS Sr	Woodbury	Woodbury, MN
F	14	Lauren Handy	6 ft 2 in (1.88 m)	Jr	Northern Collegiate	Sarnia, ON
F	15	Cassidy Derda	6 ft 2 in (1.88 m)	RS Jr	Tilton School; St. Francis Brooklyn	South Burlington, VT
F	21	Courtney Wright	6 ft 0 in (1.83 m)	Jr	Jacob Hespeler	Cambridge, ON
F	24	Carmen Handy	6 ft 3 in (1.91 m)	Fr	Northern Collegiate Institute	Sarnia, ON
F	32	Rachel Merrill	6 ft 3 in (1.91 m)	Sr	Owego Free Academy	Owego, NY

Head coach

- Chris Day (West Chester)

Assistant coach(es)

- Alisa Kresge (Marist)
- Dominique Bryant (Saint Joseph's)
- Stefanie Murphy (Boston College)

Legend

- (C) Team captain
- (S) Suspended
- (I) Ineligible
- (W) Walk-on
- Injured
- Current redshirt

Roster

== Schedule ==
Date time, TV	Rank^{#}	Opponent^{#}	Result	Record	Site (attendance) city, state
Exhibition
11/04/2017*; 4:30 pm		Saint Michael's	W 75–58		Patrick Gym; Burlington, VT
Non-conference regular season
11/10/2017*; 7:30 pm		at Dartmouth	L 56–66	0–1	Leede Arena (563); Hanover, NH
11/12/2017*; 2:00 pm, ACCN Extra		at Miami (FL)	L 49–73	0–2	Watsco Center (777); Coral Gables, FL
11/15/2017*; 7:00 pm		Norwich	W 75–31	1–2	Patrick Gym (437); Burlington, VT
11/17/2017*; 4:00 pm		Howard	W 88–65	2–2	Patrick Gym (398); Burlington, VT
11/19/2017*; 2:00 pm, ESPN3		Columbia	L 66–73	2–3	Patrick Gym (456); Burlington, VT
11/24/2017*; 5:00 pm, ESPN3		American; TD Bank Classic semifinals	L 62–64	2–4	Patrick Gym (906); Burlington, VT
11/25/2017*; 5:00 pm, ESPN3		James Madison; TD Bank Classic 3rd place game	L 56–68	2–5	Patrick Gym (409); Burlington, VT
12/01/2017*; 7:00 pm		at Rider	L 49–64	2–6	Alumni Gymnasium (728); Lawrenceville, NJ
12/03/2017*; 2:00 pm, ESPN3		Boston University	L 41–57	2–7	Patrick Gym (522); Burlington, VT
12/09/2017*; 12:05 pm		at Holy Cross	L 53–64	2–8	Hart Center (833); Worcester, MA
12/17/2017*; 2:00 pm, ESPN3		Northeastern	L 66–71	2–9	Patrick Gym (259); Burlington, VT
12/21/2017*; 11:00 am, ESPN3		Central Connecticut	W 62–48	3–9	Patrick Gym (2,013); Burlington, VT
12/30/2017*; 1:00 pm		at FIU	L 70–80	3–10	FIU Arena (216); Miami, FL
America East regular season
01/03/2018; 7:00 pm, ESPN3		UMass Lowell	W 63–55	4–10 (1–0)	Patrick Gym (164); Burlington, VT
01/06/2018; 7:00 pm, ESPN3		at UMBC	W 72–58	5–10 (2–0)	Retriever Activities Center (291); Catonsville, MD
01/13/2018; 2:00 pm, ESPN3		at Stony Brook	L 57–80	5–11 (2–1)	Island Federal Credit Union Arena (685); Stony Brook, NY
01/15/2018; 1:00 pm, ESPN3		at Maine	L 55–64	5–12 (2–2)	Cross Insurance Center (1,584); Bangor, ME
01/18/2018; 7:00 pm, ESPN3		New Hampshire	L 49–52	5–13 (2–3)	Patrick Gym (441); Burlington, VT
01/21/2018; 2:00 pm, ESPN3		Hartford	W 53–47	6–13 (3–3)	Patrick Gym (352); Burlington, VT
01/24/2018; 11:00 am, ESPN3		at Albany	L 55–67	6–14 (3–4)	SEFCU Arena (2,248); Albany, NY
01/31/2018; 7:00 pm, ESPN3		Binghamton	L 48–62	6–15 (3–5)	Patrick Gym (1,161); Burlington, VT
02/03/2018; 2:00 pm, ESPN3		UMBC	L 51–52	6–16 (3–6)	Patrick Gym (1,360); Burlington, VT
02/05/2018; 7:00 pm, ESPN3		at New Hampshire	W 58–53	7–16 (4–6)	Lundholm Gym (303); Bangor, ME
02/08/2018; 7:00 pm, ESPN3		Albany	W 62–57	8–16 (5–6)	Patrick Gym (336); Burlington, VT
02/11/2018; 2:00 pm, ESPN3		at UMass Lowell	L 60–65	8–17 (5–7)	Tsongas Center (1,016); Lowell, MA
02/14/2018; 7:00 pm, ESPN3		at Binghamton	L 38–52	8–18 (5–8)	Binghamton University Events Center (1,173); Vestal, NY
02/17/2018; 2:00 pm, ESPN3		at Hartford	L 52–91	8–19 (5–9)	Chase Arena at Reich Family Pavilion (1,281); West Hartford, CT
02/22/2018; 7:00 pm, ESPN3		Maine	L 47–79	8–20 (5–10)	Patrick Gym (505); Burlington, VT
02/25/2018; 2:00 pm, ESPN3		Stony Brook	L 49–55	8–21 (5–11)	Patrick Gym (694); Burlington, VT
America East Women's Tournament
03/03/2018; 6:00 pm, ESPN3	(7)	vs. (2) Albany; Quarterfinals	L 42–60	8–22	Cross Insurance Center; Portland, ME
*Non-conference game. ^{#}Rankings from AP Poll. (#) Tournament seedings in parentheses. All times are in Eastern Time.

== See also ==
- 2017–18 Vermont Catamounts men's basketball team
