= 2017–18 Stony Brook Seawolves women's basketball team =

Intercollegiate basketball season

2017–18 Stony Brook Seawolves women's basketball
- Conference: America East Conference
- Record: 18–12 (10–6 America East)
- Head coach: Caroline McCombs (4th season)
- Assistant coaches: Dan Rickard; Janie Mitchell; Audrey Cunningham
- Home arena: Island Federal Credit Union Arena

2017–18 America East Conference women's basketball standings
	Conf.				Overall
Team	W		L	PCT	W		L	PCT
Maine †	13	–	3	.813	23	–	10	.697
Albany	12	–	4	.750	24	–	8	.750
Binghamton	10	–	6	.625	20	–	12	.625
Stony Brook	10	–	6	.625	18	–	12	.600
Hartford	9	–	7	.563	19	–	13	.594
New Hampshire	9	–	7	.563	19	–	12	.613
Vermont	5	–	11	.313	8	–	22	.267
UMBC	3	–	13	.188	5	–	26	.161
UMass Lowell	1	–	15	.063	4	–	26	.133
† 2018 America East tournament winner As of 20 March 2018; Rankings from AP poll

The 2017–18 Stony Brook Seawolves women's basketball team represented Stony Brook University during the 2017–18 NCAA Division I women's basketball season. The Seawolves, led by fourth-year head coach Caroline McCombs, played their home games at the Island Federal Credit Union Arena in Stony Brook, New York and were members in the America East Conference.

== Media ==
All non-televised home games and conference road games streamed on either ESPN3 or AmericaEast.tv. Most road games will stream on the opponents website. All games had an audio broadcast streamed online through the Pack Network.

== Roster ==
2017–18 Stony Brook Seawolves women's basketball team
Players
Coaches

Pos.	#	Name	Height	Year	Previous school	Hometown
F	2	Cheyenne Clark	5 ft 11 in (1.8 m)	Jr	Deptford Township; Mohawk Valley CC	Deptford, NJ
F	3	Oksana Gouchie-Provencher	6 ft 4 in (1.93 m)	RS Fr	Bill Crothers Secondary	Markham, ON
G/F	5	Jonae Cox	5 ft 11 in (1.8 m)	Fr	Woodrow Wilson	Portsmouth, VA
G	10	Chantz Cherry	5 ft 7 in (1.7 m)	Fr	Southwest DeKalb	Decatur, GA
G	11	Jerell Matthews	5 ft 9 in (1.75 m)	Jr	Marian Catholic	Chicago, IL
F	12	Kina Smith	6 ft 1 in (1.85 m)	So	Utica Academy of Science Charter School	The Bronx, NY
G	14	Giolibeth Pérez	5 ft 7 in (1.7 m)	So	Ferguson	Camuy, Puerto Rico
C	20	Ayshia Baker	6 ft 3 in (1.91 m)	Jr	George Jenkins; Florida State College at Jacksonville	Lakewood, FL
G	21	Aaliyah Worley	5 ft 11 in (1.8 m)	Sr	George Washington Carver	Philadelphia, PA
F	22	McKenzie Bushee	6 ft 1 in (1.85 m)	Fr	Mt. Lebanon	Pittsburgh, PA
G/F	24	Hailey Zeise	5 ft 10 in (1.78 m)	Fr	North Allegheny	Pittsburgh, PA
F	30	Kyra Dixon	5 ft 11 in (1.8 m)	RS Fr	Collins Hill	Lawrenceville, GA
F	33	India Pagan	6 ft 1 in (1.85 m)	Fr	New London	New London, CT

Head coach

- Caroline McCombs (Youngstown State)

Assistant coach(es)

- Dan Rickard (Stony Brook)
- Janie Mitchell (Georgia Tech)
- Audrey Cunningham (New Haven)

Legend

- (C) Team captain
- (S) Suspended
- (I) Ineligible
- (W) Walk-on
- Injured
- Current redshirt

Roster
Last update: March 9, 2025

== Schedule ==
Date time, TV	Rank^{#}	Opponent^{#}	Result	Record	Site (attendance) city, state
Exhibition
November 1, 2017*; 11:00 a.m.		at St. John's; Red Cross Disaster Relief Game	L 45–66		Carnesecca Arena (110); Queens, NY
Non-conference regular season
November 11, 2017*; 6:00 p.m., ESPN3		Manhattan	W 74–59	1–0	Island Federal Credit Union Arena (816); Stony Brook, NY
November 14, 2017*; 6:00 p.m.		at Hofstra	W 73–49	2–0	Hofstra Arena (312); Hempstead, NY
November 19, 2017*; 2:00 p.m.		at Fairleigh Dickinson	W 56–51	3–0	Rothman Center (227); Hackensack, NJ
November 22, 2017*; 12:00 p.m., ESPN3		Farmingdale State	W 76–25	4–0	Island Federal Credit Union Arena (504); Stony Brook, NY
November 26, 2017*; 4:00 p.m., ESPN3		Wagner	W 69–50	5–0	Island Federal Credit Union Arena (378); Stony Brook, NY
December 1, 2017*; 7:00 p.m.		at Cornell	L 40–48	5–1	Newman Arena (267); Ithaca, NY
December 3, 2017*; 2:00 p.m., ACCN Extra		at Syracuse	L 70–81 ^{OT}	5–2	Carrier Dome (1,617); Syracuse, NY
December 6, 2017*; 7:00 p.m., ESPN3		Yale	L 71–77 ^{2OT}	5–3	Island Federal Credit Union Arena; Stony Brook, NY
December 10, 2017*; 1:00 p.m.		at Northwestern	L 36–68	5–4	Beardsley Gym (654); Evanston, IL
December 14, 2017*; 7:00 p.m., ESPN3		Iona	W 63–46	6–4	Island Federal Credit Union Arena (461); Stony Brook, NY
December 17, 2017*; 2:00 p.m., ESPN3		Central Connecticut	W 60–55	7–4	Island Federal Credit Union Arena (557); Stony Brook, NY
December 21, 2017*; 2:00 p.m., ESPN3		at Georgia Southern	W 68–49	8–4	Hanner Fieldhouse (133); Statesboro, GA
December 31, 2017*; 2:00 p.m., NESN		at Harvard	L 53–60	8–5	Lavietes Pavilion (508); Cambridge, MA
America East regular season
January 3, 2018; 7:00 p.m., ESPN3		at Maine	L 56–64	8–6 (0–1)	Cross Insurance Center (1,103); Bangor, ME
January 6, 2018; 2:00 p.m., ESPN3		Hartford	L 68–75	8–7 (0–2)	Island Federal Credit Union Arena (537); Stony Brook, NY
January 10, 2018; 7:00 p.m., ESPN3		Albany	L 68–72 ^{OT}	8–8 (0–3)	Island Federal Credit Union Arena (502); Stony Brook, NY
January 13, 2018; 2:00 p.m., ESPN3		Vermont	W 80–57	9–8 (1–3)	Island Federal Credit Union Arena (685); Stony Brook, NY
January 18, 2018; 7:00 p.m., ESPN3		at Binghamton	W 67–59	10–8 (2–3)	Binghamton University Events Center (1,432); Vestal, NY
January 21, 2018; 2:00 p.m., ESPN3		New Hampshire	L 50–51	10–9 (2–4)	Island Federal Credit Union Arena (1,120); Stony Brook, NY
January 24, 2018; 7:00 p.m., ESPN3		UMass Lowell	W 59–50	11–9 (3–4)	Island Federal Credit Union Arena (559); Stony Brook, NY
January 27, 2018; 2:00 p.m., ESPN3		at Albany	L 58–64	11–10 (3–5)	SEFCU Arena (1,188); Albany, NY
January 31, 2018; 7:00 p.m.		at UMBC	W 69–44	12–10 (4–5)	Retriever Activities Center (324); Catonsville, MD
February 3, 2018; 2:00 p.m., ESPN3		at Hartford	W 66–58	13–10 (5–5)	Chase Arena at Reich Family Pavilion (917); West Hartford, CT
February 5, 2018; 7:00 p.m., ESPN3		Binghamton	L 64–69	13–11 (5–6)	Island Federal Credit Union Arena (562); Stony Brook, NY
February 8, 2018; 7:00 p.m., ESPN3		at UMass Lowell	W 63–60	14–11 (6–6)	Costello Athletic Center (472); Lowell, MA
February 11, 2018; 2:00 p.m., ESPN3		Maine	W 76–68	15–11 (7–6)	Island Federal Credit Union Arena (1,107); Stony Brook, NY
February 14, 2018; 7:00 p.m., ESPN3		UMBC	W 53–49	16–11 (8–6)	Island Federal Credit Union Arena (267); Stony Brook, NY
February 17, 2018; 1:00 p.m., ESPN3		at New Hampshire	W 62–56	17–11 (9–6)	Lundholm Gym (421); Durham, NH
February 25, 2018; 2:00 p.m., ESPN3		at Vermont	W 55–49	18–11 (10–6)	Patrick Gym (694); Burlington, VT
America East women's tournament
March 3, 2018; 2:15 p.m., ESPN3	(4)	vs. (5) New Hampshire; Quarterfinals	L 54–71	18–12	Cross Insurance Arena (2,158); Portland, ME
*Non-conference game. ^{#}Rankings from AP poll. (#) Tournament seedings in parentheses. All times are in Eastern.

== See also ==
- 2017–18 Stony Brook Seawolves men's basketball team
