= Maine Black Bears women's basketball =

American college basketball program

2026–27 Maine Black Bears women's basketball team
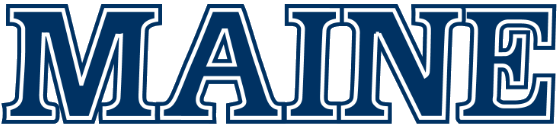
- University: University of Maine
- Head coach: Amy Vachon (10th season)
- Location: Orono, Maine
- Arena: Cross Insurance Center/Memorial Gym (capacity: 6,674/5,712)
- Conference: America East
- Nickname: Black Bears
- Colors: Maine blue, white, and navy

NCAA Division I tournament round of 32
- 1999

NCAA Division I tournament appearances
- 1995, 1996, 1997, 1998, 1999, 2000, 2004, 2018, 2019, 2024

Conference tournament champions
- 1990, 1991, 1995, 1996, 1997, 1998, 2004, 2018, 2019, 2024

Conference regular-season champions
- 1988, 1989, 1990, 1991, 1994, 1995, 1996, 1997, 1999, 2003, 2004, 2005, 2015, 2016, 2018, 2019, 2021, 2022, 2024

Uniforms
Home	Away

The Maine Black Bears women's basketball team is the basketball team that is representing University of Maine in Orono, Maine, United States. The school's team currently competes in the America East Conference.

== History ==
From 1985 to 2004, the Black Bears went to 15 North Atlantic Conference/America East Conference tournament championships, winning seven of them and finishing as runner-up in the other eight. During the 2017–18 and 2018–19 season Maine has won back to back America East regular season and conference tournament championships.

== Postseason ==
=== NCAA Division I ===
Maine has made 10 appearances in the NCAA Division I women's basketball tournament. The combined record of the Black Bears is 1–10.

Year	Seed	Round	Opponent	Result
1995	#16	First Round	#1 Connecticut	L 75−105
1996	#11	First Round	#6 George Washington	L 67−83
1997	#13	First Round	#4 LSU	L 79−88
1998	#13	First Round	#4 NC State	L 64−89
1999	#10	First Round; Second Round	#7 Stanford #2 Old Dominion	W 60−58; L 62−72
2000	#12	First Round	#5 North Carolina	L 57−62
2004	#13	First Round	#4 Texas Tech	L 50−60
2018	#15	First Round	#2 Texas	L 54−83
2019	#14	First Round	#3 NC State	L 51−63
2024	#15	First Round	#15 Ohio State	L 57–80

=== WNIT ===
Maine has made five appearances in the Women's National Invitation Tournament. the combined record of the Black Bears is 0–5.

Year	Round	Opponent	Result
2003	First Round	Creighton	L 74–67
2005	First Round	West Virginia	L 74–59
2015	First Round	Villanova	L 71–60
2016	First Round	Quinnipiac	L 90–43
2022	First Round	Boston College	L 69–44

== Year by year results ==
Season	Team	Overall	Conference	Standing	Postseason	Coaches' poll	AP poll
Peter Gavett (NAC) (1983–1988)
1983–84	Peter Gavett	16–11					
1984–85	Peter Gavett	21–9	3–2				
1985–86	Peter Gavett	22–7	9–3				
1986–87	Peter Gavett	24–4	11–3				
1987–88	Peter Gavett	23–6	12–2				
Peter Gavett:		106–37 (.741)	35–10 (.778)				
Trish Roberts (NAC) (1988–1992)
1988–89	Trish Roberts	19–8	13–1				
1989–90	Trish Roberts	23–7	11–1				
1990–91	Trish Roberts	20–8	9–1				
1991–92	Trish Roberts	20–9	11–2				
Trish Roberts:		82–32 (.719)	44–5 (.898)				
Joanne Palombo-McCallie (America East/NAC) (1992–2000)
1992–93	Joanne Palombo-McCallie	9–20	4-10				
1993–94	Joanne Palombo-McCallie	20–7	12-2				
1994–95	Joanne Palombo-McCallie	24–6	14-2		NCAA First Round		
1995–96	Joanne Palombo-McCallie	27–5	18-0		NCAA First Round		
1996–97	Joanne Palombo-McCallie	22–8	17-1		NCAA First Round		
1997–98	Joanne Palombo-McCallie	21–9	13-5		NCAA First Round		
1998–99	Joanne Palombo-McCallie	24–7	17-1	1st	NCAA Second Round		
1999–00	Joanne Palombo-McCallie	20–11	14-4		NCAA First Round		
Joanne Palombo-McCallie:		167–73 (.696)	109–25 (.813)				
Sharon Versyp (America East) (2000–2005)
2000–01	Sharon Versyp	12–16	9-9				
2001–02	Sharon Versyp	16–12	9-7				
2002–03	Sharon Versyp	25–6	16-0	1st			
2003–04	Sharon Versyp	25–7	17-1	1st	NCAA First Round		
2004–05	Sharon Versyp	20–10	16-2	1st			
Sharon Versyp:		98–51 (.658)	67–19 (.779)				
Ann McInerney (America East) (2005–2007)
2005–06	Ann McInerney	10–19	5-11	7th			
2006–07	Ann McInerney	13–15	7-9	5th			
Ann McInerney:		23–34 (.404)	12–20 (.375)				
Cindy Blodgett (America East) (2007–2011)
2007–08	Cindy Blodgett	7–23	4-12	8th			
2008–09	Cindy Blodgett	5–25	3-13	9th			
2009–10	Cindy Blodgett	8–21	4-12	8th			
2010–11	Cindy Blodgett	4–25	2-15	9th			
Cindy Blodgett:		24–94 (.203)	13–52 (.200)				
Richard Barron (America East) (2011–2017)
2011–12	Richard Barron	8–23	4-12	8th			
2012–13	Richard Barron	4–24	3-12	9th			
2013–14	Richard Barron	17–15	10-6	4th			
2014–15	Richard Barron	23–9	14-2	T-1st	WNIT First Round		
2015–16	Richard Barron	26–9	15-1	T-1st	WNIT First Round		
2016–17	Richard Barron	18–16	9-7	4th			
Richard Barron:		96–96 (.500)	55–40 (.579)				
Amy Vachon (America East) (2017–present)
2017–18	Amy Vachon	23–9	13–3	T–1st	NCAA First Round		
2018–19	Amy Vachon	25–8	15–1	1st	NCAA First Round		
2019–20	Amy Vachon	18–14	12–4	2nd			
2020–21	Amy Vachon	17–3	13–2	1st			
2021–22	Amy Vachon	20–12	15–3	1st	WNIT First Round		
2022–23	Amy Vachon	14–13	10–5	3rd			
2023–24	Amy Vachon	24-10	14-2	1st	NCAA First Round		
Amy Vachon:		117–59 (.665)	78–18 (.813)				
Total:		{{{overall}}}					
National champion Postseason invitational champion Conference regular season champion Conference regular season and conference tournament champion Division regular season champion Division regular season and conference tournament champion Conference tournament champion
