= 2017–18 UMass Lowell River Hawks women's basketball team =

Intercollegiate basketball season

2017–18 UMass Lowell River Hawks women's basketball
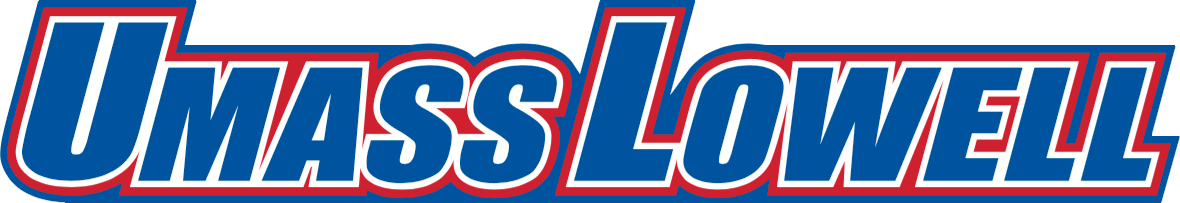
- Conference: America East Conference
- Record: 4–26 (1–15 America East)
- Head coach: Jenerrie Harris (4th season)
- Assistant coaches: Kara Kelly; Julie Plant; Will Alton
- Home arena: Costello Athletic Center; Tsongas Center

2017–18 America East Conference women's basketball standings
	Conf.				Overall
Team	W		L	PCT	W		L	PCT
Maine †	13	–	3	.813	23	–	10	.697
Albany	12	–	4	.750	24	–	8	.750
Binghamton	10	–	6	.625	20	–	12	.625
Stony Brook	10	–	6	.625	18	–	12	.600
Hartford	9	–	7	.563	19	–	13	.594
New Hampshire	9	–	7	.563	19	–	12	.613
Vermont	5	–	11	.313	8	–	22	.267
UMBC	3	–	13	.188	5	–	26	.161
UMass Lowell	1	–	15	.063	4	–	26	.133
† 2018 America East tournament winner As of 20 March 2018; Rankings from AP poll

The 2017–18 UMass Lowell River Hawks women's basketball team represented University of Massachusetts Lowell during the 2017–18 NCAA Division I women's basketball season. The River Hawks were led by fourth-year head coach Jenerrie Harris and played most their home games in the Costello Athletic Center while select games will were played in the Tsongas Center at UMass Lowell. They were members of the America East Conference. They finished the season 4–26, 1–15 in America East play, to finish in last place. They lost in the first round of the America East women's tournament to UMBC.

On March 5, Jenerrie Harris's contract was not renewed. She finished at UMass Lowell with a four-year record of 25–91. On April 12, former Boston College assistant coach Tom Garrick was named the next head coach of the River Hawks.

== Media ==
All non-televised home games and conference road games were streamed on either ESPN3 or AmericaEast.tv. Most road games were streamed on the opponents' websites.

== Roster ==
2017–18 UMass Lowell River Hawks women's basketball team
Players
Coaches

Pos.	#	Name	Height	Year	Previous school	Hometown
G	1	Kayla Gibbs	5 ft 11 in (1.8 m)	Sr	Teaneck	Teaneck, NJ
G	2	Amanda Oritz	5 ft 9 in (1.75 m)	Jr	Newton North	Newton, MA
G	3	Megan Hendrick	5 ft 9 in (1.75 m)	So	Thomas Edison	Alexandria, VA
G	4	Brianna Rudolph	5 ft 9 in (1.75 m)	RS Jr	St. Mary's	Lynn, MA
G	13	Markayla Sherman	5 ft 3 in (1.6 m)	So	Princeton	Cincinnati, OH
G	14	Felicia Korte	5 ft 11 in (1.8 m)	So	Watertown	Watertown, MA
F	15	Kiana Batagelj	5 ft 10 in (1.78 m)	Sr	Williamsburg Christian Academy; Hillsborough CC	Hamilton, ON
F	21	Oda Shackelford	6 ft 2 in (1.88 m)	Jr	Southwestern	Edinburgh, IN
G	22	Nazarae Butler	5 ft 8 in (1.73 m)	RS So	Columbus Africentric	Columbus, OH
G	23	Shawnkia McCallum	5 ft 9 in (1.75 m)	So	St. Frances Academy	Perry Hall, MD
F	50	Kathrine Smith	6 ft 2 in (1.88 m)	Jr	Canterbury	Fort Wayne, IN

Head coach

- Jenerrie Harris (Kentucky)

Assistant coach(es)

- Kara Kelly (Assumption (MA))
- Julie Plant
- Will Alton (Penn State)

Legend

- (C) Team captain
- (S) Suspended
- (I) Ineligible
- (W) Walk-on
- Injured
- Current redshirt

Roster
Last update: August 14, 2024

== Schedule ==
Date time, TV	Rank^{#}	Opponent^{#}	Result	Record	Site (attendance) city, state
Non-conference regular season
November 10, 2017*; 5:00 p.m.		at Rhode Island	L 64–81	0–1	Ryan Center (6,367); Kingston, RI
November 12, 2017*; 4:00 p.m., ESPN3		Holy Cross	L 56–84	0–2	Tsongas Center (492); Lowell, MA
November 15, 2017*; 5:00 p.m., ESPN3		Columbia	W 77–70	1–2	Costello Athletic Center (718); Lowell, MA
November 18, 2017*; 12:00 p.m.		at Longwood	L 82–84	1-3	Willett Hall (312); Farmville, VA
November 22, 2017*; 4:00 p.m.		at Texas Tech	L 65–93	1–4	United Supermarkets Arena (3,057); Lubbock, TX
November 27, 2017*; 7:00 p.m.		Fisher	W 102–47	2–4	Costello Athletic Center (143); Lowell, MA
November 29, 2017*; 7:00 p.m.		at Fairfield	L 67–78	2–5	Alumni Hall (364); Fairfield, CT
December 2, 2017*; 2:00 p.m.		at Colgate	L 64–84	2–6	Cotterell Court (213); Hamilton, NY
December 7, 2017*; 7:00 p.m.		at Saint Peter's	W 66–60	3–6	Yanitelli Center (425); Jersey City, NJ
December 9, 2017*; 2:00 p.m.		at Fairleigh Dickinson	L 51–60	3–7	Rothman Center (159); Hackensack, NJ
December 13, 2017*; 7:00 p.m., ESPN3		UMass	L 63–73	3–8	Costello Athletic Center (1,475); Lowell, MA
December 28, 2017*; 7:00 p.m., ESPN3		Morgan State	L 59–65	3–9	Costello Athletic Center (347); Lowell, MA
December 31, 2017*; 12:00 p.m., ESPN3		Cornell	L 53–71	3–10	Costello Athletic Center (203); Lowell, MA
America East regular season
January 3, 2018; 7:00 p.m.		at Vermont	L 55–63	3–11 (0–1)	Patrick Gym (164); Burlington, VT
January 10, 2018; 7:00 p.m., ESPN3		Hartford	L 42–81	3–12 (0–2)	Tsongas Center (421); Lowell, MA
January 13, 2018; 1:00 p.m., ESPN3		at UMBC	L 54–66	3–13 (0–3)	Retriever Activities Center (291); Catonsville, MD
January 15, 2018; 1:00 p.m., ESPN3		at New Hampshire	L 45–66	3–14 (0–4)	Lundholm Gym (327); Durham, NH
January 18, 2018; 7:00 p.m., ESPN3		Albany	L 52–61	3–15 (0–5)	Tsongas Center (632); Lowell, MA
January 21, 2018; 12:00 p.m., ESPN3		Binghamton	L 46–76	3–16 (0–6)	Tsongas Center; Lowell, MA
January 24, 2018; 7:00 p.m., ESPN3		at Stony Brook	L 50–59	3–17 (0–7)	Island Federal Credit Union Arena (559); Stony Brook, NY
January 27, 2018; 2:00 p.m., ESPN3		at Hartford	L 56–68	3–18 (0–8)	Chase Arena at Reich Family Pavilion (1,031); Hartford, CT
January 31, 2018; 11:00 a.m., ESPN3		Maine	L 51–69	3–19 (0–9)	Tsongas Center (4,125); Lowell, MA
February 5, 2018; 7:00 p.m.		at Albany	L 60–93	3–20 (0–10)	SEFCU Arena (903); Albany, NY
February 8, 2018; 7:00 p.m., ESPN3		Stony Brook	L 60–63	3–21 (0–11)	Costello Athletic Center (472); Lowell, MA
February 11, 2018; 2:00 p.m., ESPN3		Vermont	W 65–60	4–21 (1–11)	Tsongas Center (1.016); Lowell, MA
February 11, 2018; 7:00 p.m., ESPN3		at Maine	L 65–70	4–22 (1–12)	Cross Insurance Center (1,141); Bangor, ME
February 17, 2018; 4:00 p.m., ESPN3		at Binghamton	L 38–52	4–23 (1–13)	Binghamton University Events Center (2,001); Vestal, NY
February 22, 2018; 7:00 p.m., ESPN3		New Hampshire	L 49–70	4–24 (1–14)	Costello Athletic Center (1,153); Lowell, MA
February 25, 2018; 1:00 p.m., ESPN3		UMBC	L 39–61	4–25 (1–15)	Tsongas Center (891); Lowell, MA
America East tournament
February 28, 2018; 6:00 p.m., ESPN3	(9)	at (8) UMBC; First round	L 65–73	4–26	UMBC Event Center (281); Catonsville, MD
*Non-conference game. ^{#}Rankings from AP poll. (#) Tournament seedings in parentheses. All times are in Eastern.

== See also ==
- 2017–18 UMass Lowell River Hawks men's basketball team
