= 2017–18 Central Connecticut Blue Devils women's basketball team =

Intercollegiate basketball season

2017–18 Central Connecticut Blue Devils women's basketball
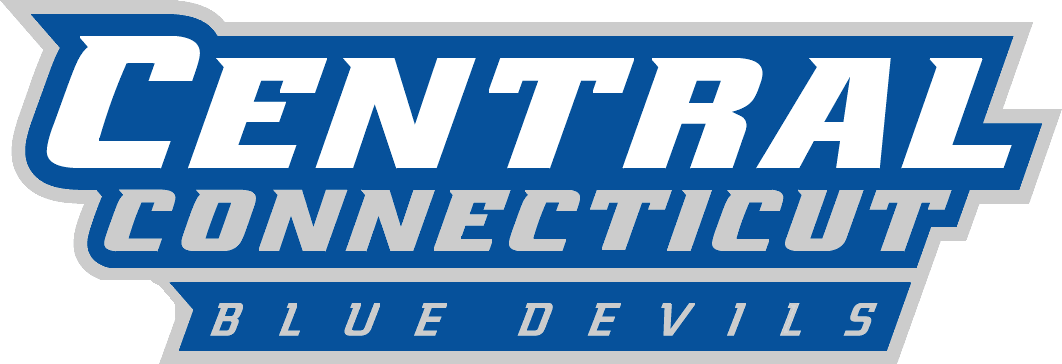
- Conference: Northeast Conference
- Record: 7–23 (7–11 NEC)
- Head coach: Beryl Piper (11th season)
- Home arena: William H. Detrick Gymnasium

2017–18 Northeast Conference women's basketball standings
| | Conf. | | | | Overall |
| Team | W | | L | PCT | W | | L | PCT |
|---|---|---|---|---|---|---|---|---|
| Robert Morris | 16 | – | 2 | .889 | 25 | – | 8 | .758 |
| Saint Francis (PA) † | 16 | – | 2 | .889 | 24 | – | 10 | .706 |
| Sacred Heart | 9 | – | 9 | .500 | 14 | – | 17 | .452 |
| St. Francis Brooklyn | 9 | – | 9 | .500 | 13 | – | 17 | .433 |
| LIU Brooklyn | 8 | – | 10 | .444 | 13 | – | 18 | .419 |
| Bryant | 8 | – | 10 | .444 | 9 | – | 21 | .300 |
| Fairleigh Dickinson | 7 | – | 11 | .389 | 15 | – | 15 | .500 |
| Central Connecticut | 7 | – | 11 | .389 | 7 | – | 23 | .233 |
| Mount St. Mary's | 6 | – | 12 | .333 | 9 | – | 20 | .310 |
| Wagner | 4 | – | 14 | .222 | 6 | – | 23 | .207 |
† 2018 NEC tournament winner As of March 17, 2018; Rankings from AP poll

The 2017–18 Central Connecticut Blue Devils women's basketball team represented Central Connecticut State University during the 2017–18 NCAA Division I women's basketball season. The Blue Devils were led by eleventh-year head coach Beryl Piper, and played their home games at the William H. Detrick Gymnasium in New Britain, Connecticut as members of the Northeast Conference (NEC). They finished the season 7–23 overall, 7–11 in NEC play, to finish for a tie in seventh place. Central Connecticut secured a seventh seed in the NEC tournament, losing to Robert Morris in the first round.

== Roster ==
2017–18 Central Connecticut Blue Devils women's basketball team
Players
Coaches

| Pos. | # | Name | Height | Year | Previous school | Hometown |
|---|---|---|---|---|---|---|
| G | 2 | Taylor Goode | 5 ft 7 in (1.7 m) | RS So | St. Anthony's | Holbrook, NY |
| G | 4 | Kiana Patterson | 5 ft 6 in (1.68 m) | Jr | Troy | Troy, NY |
| F | 10 | Andi Lydon | 6 ft 0 in (1.83 m) | Jr | Shaler | Allison Park, PA |
| G | 12 | Sydney Hines | 5 ft 7 in (1.7 m) | Jr | New Town | Owings Mills, MD |
| G/F | 14 | Ashley Forker | 5 ft 10 in (1.78 m) | Fr | Faith Christian Academy | Telford, PA |
| G | 15 | Emma McCamus | 5 ft 7 in (1.7 m) | Fr | Bill Crothers Secondary | Cavan, ON |
| F | 22 | Ashley Chin | 5 ft 8 in (1.73 m) | So | Dunarton | Pickering, ON |
| F | 25 | Denisha Gardener | 6 ft 1 in (1.85 m) | Jr | Kolbe Cathedral | Norwalk, CT |
| F | 32 | Tiffany Slicklein | 5 ft 11 in (1.8 m) | Fr | Kings Park | Kings Park, NY |
| C | 33 | Ashley Berube | 6 ft 2 in (1.88 m) | Fr | Tilton | Londonderry, NH |

Head coach

- Beryl Piper (Central Connecticut State)

Assistant coach(es)

- Kerri Reaves (Marquette)
- Jason Marshall (Ramapo)
- Amanda Shannon Russo (Merrimack)

Legend

- (C) Team captain
- (S) Suspended
- (I) Ineligible
- (W) Walk-on
- Injured
- Current redshirt

Roster
Last update: June 11, 2024

== Schedule ==
| Date time, TV | Rank^{#} | Opponent^{#} | Result | Record | Site (attendance) city, state |
Non-conference regular season
| November 10, 2017* | | at West Virginia | L 52–102 | 0–1 | WVU Coliseum; Morgantown, WV |
| November 12, 2017* | | at Virginia | L 59–103 | 0–2 | John Paul Jones Arena; Charlottesville, VA |
| November 16, 2017* | | Brown | L 55–78 | 0–3 | William H. Detrick Gymnasium; New Britain, CT |
| November 20, 2017* | | at Penn State | L 66–83 | 0–4 | Bryce Jordan Center; University Park, PA |
| November 27, 2017* | | Albany | L 60–72 | 0–5 | William H. Detrick Gymnasium; New Britain, CT |
| November 29, 2017* | | Morgan State | L 41–61 | 0–6 | William H. Detrick Gymnasium; New Britain, CT |
| December 2, 2017 | | Duquesne | L 58–83 | 0–7 | Palumbo Center; Pittsburgh, PA |
| December 6, 2017* | | at Hartford; Rivalry | L 52–68 | 0–8 | Chase Arena at Reich Family Pavilion; West Hartford, CT |
| December 9, 2017* | | Yale | L 62–75 | 0–9 | William H. Detrick Gymnasium; New Britain, CT |
| December 17, 2017*; 2:00pm, ESPN3 | | at Stony Brook | L 55–60 | 0–10 | Island Federal Credit Union Arena; Stony Brook, NY |
| December 21, 2017*; 11:00am, ESPN3 | | at Vermont | L 55–60 | 0–11 | Patrick Gym; Burlington, VT |
NEC regular season
| December 29, 2017 | | Mount St. Mary's | L 56–68 | 0–12 (0–1) | William H. Detrick Gymnasium; New Britain, CT |
| December 31, 2017 | | Wagner | W 59–56 | 1–12 (1–1) | William H. Detrick Gymnasium; New Britain, CT |
| January 6, 2018 | | Bryant | L 50–66 | 1–13 (1–2) | Chace Athletic Center; Smithfield, RI |
| January 13, 2018 | | Sacred Heart | W 69–59 | 2–13 (2–2) | William H. Detrick Gymnasium; New Britain, CT |
| January 15, 2018 | | Fairleigh Dickinson | L 49–78 | 2–14 (2–3) | Rothman Center; Hackensack, NJ |
| January 20, 2018 | | St. Francis Brooklyn | L 70–78 | 2–15 (2–4) | William H. Detrick Gymnasium; New Britain, CT |
| January 22, 2018 | | LIU Brooklyn | L 54–61 | 2–16 (2–5) | William H. Detrick Gymnasium; New Britain, CT |
| January 27, 2018 | | at Saint Francis | L 59–87 | 2–17 (2–6) | DeGol Arena; Loretto, PA |
| January 29, 2018 | | Robert Morris | L 47–66 | 2–18 (2–7) | William H. Detrick Gymnasium; New Britain, CT |
| February 3, 2018 | | at Sacred Heart | W 73–71 | 3–18 (3–7) | William H. Pitt Center; Fairfield, CT |
| February 5, 2018 | | Fairleigh Dickinson | W 76–56 | 4–18 (4–7) | William H. Detrick Gymnasium; New Britain, CT |
| February 10, 2018; ESPN 3 | | Bryant | W 66–59 | 5–18 (5–7) | William H. Detrick Gymnasium; New Britain, CT |
| February 17, 2018 | | at Wagner | W 66–64 | 6–18 (6–7) | Spiro Sports Center; Staten Island, NY |
| February 19, 2018 | | Mount St. Mary's | L 56–76 | 6–19 (6–8) | William H. Detrick Gymnasium; New Britain, CT |
| February 24, 2018 | | Saint Francis | L 75–85 | 6–20 (6–9) | William H. Detrick Gymnasium; New Britain, CT |
| February 26, 2018 | | Robert Morris | L 51–67 | 6–21 (6–10) | William H. Detrick Gymnasium; New Britain, CT |
| March 2, 2018 | | St. Francis Brooklyn | W 83–77 ^{OT} | 7–21 (7–10) | Generoso Pope Athletic Complex; Brooklyn, NY |
| March 4, 2018 | | LIU Post | L 57–63 | 7–22 (7–11) | Steinberg Wellness Center; Brooklyn, NY |
NEC tournament
| March 7, 2018 | (7) | (2) Robert Morris; Quarterfinals | L 54–60 | 7–23 | North Athletic Complex; Moon Township, PA |
*Non-conference game. ^{#}Rankings from AP poll. (#) Tournament seedings in parentheses. All times are in Eastern.
