= 2018 Northeast Conference women's basketball tournament =

- Classification: Division I
- Season: 2017–18
- Teams: 8
- Quarterfinals site: DeGol Arena & Student Recreation and Fitness Center; Loretto, Pennsylvania & Moon Township, Pennsylvania
- Semifinals site: DeGol Arena & Student Recreation and Fitness Center; Loretto, Pennsylvania & Moon Township, Pennsylvania
- Finals site: DeGol Arena; Loretto, Pennsylvania
- Champions: Saint Francis (PA) (12th title)
- Winning coach: Joe Haigh (1st title)
- MVP: Jessica Kovatch (Saint Francis (PA))
- Top scorer: Jessica Kovatch (Saint Francis (PA)) (103 points)

2017–18 Northeast Conference women's basketball standings
	Conf.				Overall
Team	W		L	PCT	W		L	PCT
Robert Morris	16	–	2	.889	25	–	8	.758
Saint Francis (PA) †	16	–	2	.889	24	–	10	.706
Sacred Heart	9	–	9	.500	14	–	17	.452
St. Francis Brooklyn	9	–	9	.500	13	–	17	.433
LIU Brooklyn	8	–	10	.444	13	–	18	.419
Bryant	8	–	10	.444	9	–	21	.300
Fairleigh Dickinson	7	–	11	.389	15	–	15	.500
Central Connecticut	7	–	11	.389	7	–	23	.233
Mount St. Mary's	6	–	12	.333	9	–	20	.310
Wagner	4	–	14	.222	6	–	23	.207
† 2018 NEC tournament winner As of March 17, 2018; Rankings from AP poll

The 2018 Northeast Conference women's basketball tournament was the concluding event of the 2017–18 season of the Northeast Conference (NEC), held from March 7–11, 2018. Unlike most NCAA Division I basketball conference tournaments, the NEC tournament does not include all of the league's teams. The tournament instead features only the top eight teams from regular-season NEC play. Regular-season co-champion Saint Francis of Pennsylvania won the tournament and with it the NEC's automatic berth in the 2018 NCAA Division I women's basketball tournament.

== Format ==
For the first time, the NEC Women's Basketball Tournament did not use what the conference calls a "complete high-seed hosting" format, in which all games are played at the home of the higher seed. In addition, the tournament did not reseed teams after each round, a format it had used since the 2011 edition. Instead, each half of the bracket was hosted by one of the league's two top seeds. The final continues to be played at the home court of the top remaining seed.

== Seeds ==
The NEC uses the following criteria for breaking two-way ties in the conference standings:

- Head-to-head record.
- Record against the top team not involved in the tie. If more than one team is tied for a given conference placing, the teams' combined records against all teams involved in that tie are compared instead.
- If the tie is not broken, repeat the above step with the next-lowest team not involved in the tie, with the noted caveat in the case of a tie for that placing. Repeat as necessary.
- If the tie is not broken after cycling through the entire conference table, RPI is used.

The procedure for breaking ties in which three or more teams are involved will not be discussed here, since no such ties existed this season.

Seed	School	Conference	Overall	Tiebreaker 1	Tiebreaker 2	Tiebreaker 3
1	Saint Francis (PA)	16–2	21–9	1–1 vs. RMU	3–1 vs. SFB/SHU, 12–0 vs. remainder of NEC	RPI: 117
2	Robert Morris	16–2	23–6	1–1 vs. SFU	3–1 vs. SFB/SHU, 12–0 vs. remainder of NEC	RPI: 132
3	St. Francis Brooklyn	9–9	13–16	1–1 vs. SHU	1–3 vs. SFU/RMU, 4–0 vs. Bryant/LIUB	
4	Sacred Heart	9–9	13–16	1–1 vs. SFB	1–3 vs. SFU/RMU, 2–2 vs. Bryant/LIUB	
5	Bryant	8–10	9–20	1–1 vs. LIUB	0–4 vs. SFU/RMU, 3–1 vs. SFB/SHU	
6	LIU Brooklyn	8–10	12–17	1–1 vs. Bryant	0–4 vs. SFU/RMU, 1–3 vs. SFB/SHU	
7	Central Connecticut	7–11	7–22	1–1 vs. FDU	0–4 vs. SFU/RMU, 3–1 vs. SFB/SHU	
8	Fairleigh Dickinson	7–11	15–14	1–1 vs. CC	0–4 vs. SFU/RMU, 2–2 vs. SFB/SHU	

== Bracket ==
Quarterfinals; Wednesday, March 7 NEC Front Row
1	Saint Francis (PA)	89
8	Fairleigh Dickinson	70
4	Sacred Heart	80
5	Bryant	63
2	Robert Morris	60
7	Central Connecticut	54
3	St. Francis Brooklyn	56
6	LIU Brooklyn	59

Semifinals; Thursday, March 8 ESPN3
1	Saint Francis (PA)	78
4	Sacred Heart	47
2	Robert Morris	74
6	LIU Brooklyn	44

Championship; Sunday, March 11; ESPNU
1	Saint Francis (PA)	66
2	Robert Morris	56

The top two seeds each hosted their half of the bracket; the final was hosted by the top remaining seed.

== All-tournament team ==
Tournament MVP in bold.

Name	School
**Jessica Kovatch**	Saint Francis (PA)
Caitlyn Kroll	Saint Francis (PA)
Jocelynne Jones	Robert Morris
Denisha Petty-Evans	LIU Brooklyn
Tykera Carter	Sacred Heart
