= 2017–18 St. Francis Brooklyn Terriers women's basketball team =

Intercollegiate basketball season

2017–18 St. Francis Brooklyn Terriers women's basketball
- Conference: Northeast Conference
- Record: 13–17 (9–9 NEC)
- Head coach: John Thurston (6th season)
- Associate head coach: Dionne Dodson (10th season)
- Assistant coaches: Ranait Griff (3rd season); Leah Fechko (1st season)
- Home arena: Generoso Pope Athletic Complex

2017–18 Northeast Conference women's basketball standings
	Conf.				Overall
Team	W		L	PCT	W		L	PCT
Robert Morris	16	–	2	.889	25	–	8	.758
Saint Francis (PA) †	16	–	2	.889	24	–	10	.706
Sacred Heart	9	–	9	.500	14	–	17	.452
St. Francis Brooklyn	9	–	9	.500	13	–	17	.433
LIU Brooklyn	8	–	10	.444	13	–	18	.419
Bryant	8	–	10	.444	9	–	21	.300
Fairleigh Dickinson	7	–	11	.389	15	–	15	.500
Central Connecticut	7	–	11	.389	7	–	23	.233
Mount St. Mary's	6	–	12	.333	9	–	20	.310
Wagner	4	–	14	.222	6	–	23	.207
† 2018 NEC tournament winner As of March 17, 2018; Rankings from AP poll

The 2017–18 St. Francis Brooklyn Terriers women's basketball team represented St. Francis College during the 2017–18 NCAA Division I women's basketball season. The Terrier's home games were played at the Generoso Pope Athletic Complex. The team has been a member of the Northeast Conference since 1988. St. Francis Brooklyn is coached by John Thurston, who was in his sixth year at the helm of the Terriers. They finished the season 13–17, 9–9 in NEC play to finish in a tie for third place. They lost in the quarterfinals of the NEC tournament to LIU Brooklyn.

After the 2017–18 season head coach John Thurston retired from coaching the St. Francis Terriers women's basketball team.

== Roster ==
2017–18 St. Francis Brooklyn Terriers women's basketball team
Players
Coaches

Pos.	#	Name	Height	Year	Hometown
F	14	Alex Delaney	5 ft 10 in (1.78 m)	Sr	Sydney, Australia
G	1	Amy O'Neill	5 ft 6 in (1.68 m)	Jr	Melbourne, Australia
G	4	Etta Andersen	5 ft 9 in (1.75 m)	Jr	Copenhagen, Denmark
F	12	Maria Palarino	5 ft 10 in (1.78 m)	Jr	Irwin, Pennsylvania
G	32	Dana DiRenzo	5 ft 10 in (1.78 m)	Jr	Hammonton, New Jersey
G	3	Mia Ehling	5 ft 8 in (1.73 m)	Jr	Holmdel, New Jersey
F	34	Lorraine Hickman	6 ft 0 in (1.83 m)	Jr	Floral Park, New York
F	40	Tori Wagner	6 ft 2 in (1.88 m)	Jr	Freehold, New Jersey
G	23	Jade Johnson	5 ft 9 in (1.75 m)	So	Adelaide, Australia
F	13	Samantha Keltos	6 ft 2 in (1.88 m)	So	Ontario, Canada
F	22	Abby Anderson	5 ft 11 in (1.8 m)	Fr	Scranton, Pennsylvania
F	31	Ally Lassen	6 ft 1 in (1.85 m)	Fr	Point Pleasant, New Jersey
F	35	Casey Carangelo	6 ft 0 in (1.83 m)	Fr	Thomaston, Connecticut

Head coach

- John Thurston (Seton Hall '70)

Assistant coach(es)

- Dionne Dodson (Muskingum '97)
- Ranait Griff (Fordham '15)
- Leah Fechko (St. Francis '16)

Legend

- (C) Team captain
- (S) Suspended
- (I) Ineligible
- (W) Walk-on
- Injured
- Current redshirt

Roster
Last update: August 25, 2017

== Schedule and results ==
Date time, TV	Opponent	Result	Record	High points	High rebounds	High assists	Site (attendance) city, state
Non-conference regular season
November 10, 2017*; 7:00 pm, ESPN3	at St. John's	L 49–73	0–1	11 – Delaney	7 – O'Neill	4 – Delaney	Carnesecca Arena; Queens, NY
November 16, 2017*; 7:00 pm	Army	W 73–52	1–1	16 – 2 tied	6 – Palarino	6 – O'Neill	Generoso Pope Athletic Complex (100); Brooklyn, NY
November 18, 2017*; 7:00 pm	at Manhattan	L 54–57	1–2	16 – Johnson	6 – O'Neill	4 – Palarino	Draddy Gymnasium (986); Riverdale, NY
November 24, 2017*; 12:00 pm	at Florida Atlantic; FAU Thanksgiving Tournament semifinals	L 60–80	1–3	12 – Johnson	7 – Johnson	3 – 2 tied	FAU Arena; Boca Raton, FL
November 25, 2017*; 12:00 pm	vs. Norfolk State; FAU Thanksgiving Tournament 3rd place game	L 51–52	1–4	13 – Delaney	5 – 3 tied	7 – O'Neill	FAU Arena; Boca Raton, FL
November 30, 2017*; 7:00 pm	at Saint Peter's	W 64–49	2–4	28 – Johnson	11 – Palarino	5 – O'Neill	Yanitelli Center (457); Jersey City, NJ
December 2, 2017*; 1:00 pm	at Seton Hall	L 50–84	2–5	11 – Delaney	5 – Delaney	5 – O'Neill	Walsh Gymnasium (890); South Orange, NJ
December 6, 2017*; 7:00 pm	Loyola (MD)	W 64–47	3–5	22 – Johnson	8 – Delaney	9 – O'Neill	Generoso Pope Athletic Complex (218); Brooklyn, NY
December 9, 2017*; 2:00 pm	at Howard	L 69–72 ^{OT}	3–6	14 – Johnson	10 – Pararino	4 – Pararino	Burr Gymnasium (200); Washington, D.C.
December 16, 2017*; 1:00 pm	Iona	W 72–63	4–6	22 – Pararino	6 – Pararino	5 – 2 tied	Generoso Pope Athletic Complex (205); Brooklyn, NY
December 20, 2017*; 7:00 pm	Morehead State	L 59–73	4–7	13 – Johnson	4 – 3 tied	3 – Ehling	Generoso Pope Athletic Complex (145); Brooklyn, NY
NEC Regular Season
December 29, 2017; 2:00 pm	at LIU Brooklyn; Battle of Brooklyn	L 59–61	4–8 (0–1)	15 – Delaney	7 – Hickman	6 – O'Neill	Steinberg Wellness Center (257); Brooklyn, NY
January 6, 2018; 1:00 pm	at Saint Francis (PA)	L 75–90	4–9 (0–2)	16 – Johnson	6 – 2 tied	5 – O'Neill	DeGol Arena (303); Loretto, PA
January 8, 2018; 7:00 pm	at Robert Morris	L 36–59	4–10 (0–3)	10 – Johnson	7 – Delaney	3 – Delaney	RMU North Athletic Complex (433); Moon Township, PA
January 13, 2018; 1:00 pm	Mount St. Mary's	W 82–73	5–10 (1–3)	30 – Delaney	8 – Johnson	8 – O'Neill	Generoso Pope Athletic Complex (185); Brooklyn, NY
January 15, 2018; 7:00 pm	Wagner	W 80–76	6–10 (2–3)	21 – Johnson	5 – 2 tied	7 – O'Neill	Generoso Pope Athletic Complex (187); Brooklyn, NY
January 20, 2018; 1:00 pm	at Central Connecticut	W 78–70	7–10 (3–3)	15 – 2 tied	6 – 2 tied	3 – 2 tied	William H. Detrick Gymnasium (568); New Britain, CT
January 22, 2018; 7:00 pm	at Bryant	L 63–73	7–11 (3–4)	21 – Johnson	7 – Delaney	4 – Palarino	Chace Athletic Center (214); Smithfield, RI
January 26, 2018; 7:00 pm	Fairleigh Dickinson	L 62–70	7–12 (3–5)	15 – O'Neill	9 – Delaney	4 – Delaney	Generoso Pope Athletic Complex (260); Brooklyn, NY
January 29, 2018; 7:00 pm	Sacred Heart	W 63–48	8–12 (4–5)	23 – Johnson	8 – Palarino	6 – O'Neill	Generoso Pope Athletic Complex (140); Brooklyn, NY
February 3, 2018; 1:00 pm	at Wagner	L 47–50	8–13 (4–6)	11 – Johnson	10 – O'Neill	5 – O'Neill	Spiro Sports Center (543); Staten Island, NY
February 5, 2018; 7:00 pm	at Mount St. Mary's	W 75–56	9–13 (5–6)	22 – Johnson	7 – Johnson	5 – O'Neill	Knott Arena (214); Emmitsburg, MD
February 10, 2018; 1:00 pm	Saint Francis (PA)	L 71–94	9–14 (5–7)	18 – Johnson	6 – Delaney	7 – O'Neill	Generoso Pope Athletic Complex (405); Brooklyn, NY
February 12, 2018; 7:00 pm	Robert Morris	W 49–47	10–14 (6–7)	11 – 2 tied	6 – Delaney	7 – O'Neill	Generoso Pope Athletic Complex (183); Brooklyn, NY
February 17, 2018; 1:00 pm, ESPN3	LIU Brooklyn; Battle of Brooklyn	W 64–54	11–14 (7–7)	23 – Johnson	12 – Delaney	6 – Delaney	Generoso Pope Athletic Complex (212); Brooklyn, NY
February 24, 2018; 1:00 pm	at Sacred Heart	L 60–66	11–15 (7–8)	15 – Johnson	8 – Palarino	7 – O'Neill	William H. Pitt Center (192); Fairfield, CT
February 26, 2018; 7:00 pm	at Fairleigh Dickinson	W 58–45	12–15 (8–8)	15 – Delaney	6 – 2 tied	4 – O'Neill	Rothman Center; Teaneck, NJ
March 2, 2018; 7:00 pm	Central Connecticut	L 77–83 ^{OT}	12–16 (8–9)	25 – Palarino	8 – Anderson	10 – O'Neill	Generoso Pope Athletic Complex (117); Brooklyn, NY
March 4, 2018; 1:00 pm	Bryant	W 66–60	13–16 (9–9)	20 – Johnson	6 – 2 tied	7 – O'Neill	Generoso Pope Athletic Complex (287); Brooklyn, NY
Northeast Conference tournament
March 7, 2018; 7:30 pm	vs. (6) LIU Brooklyn; Quarterfinals	L 56–59	13–17	14 – Delaney	7 – 2 tied	3 – Johnson	RMU North Athletic Complex (220); Moon Township, PA
*Non-conference game. ^{#}Rankings from AP Poll. (#) Tournament seedings in parentheses. All times are in Eastern Time.

== See also ==
- 2017–18 St. Francis Brooklyn Terriers men's basketball team
