= 2017–18 Saint Francis Red Flash women's basketball team =

Intercollegiate basketball season

2017–18 Saint Francis Red Flash women's basketball

NEC Regular Season co-champions and Tournament Champions

NCAA Women's Tournament, first round
- Conference: Northeast Conference
- Record: 24–10 (16–2 NEC)
- Head coach: Joe Haigh (6th season)
- Associate head coach: Kyle Hejmowski
- Assistant coaches: Vanessa Abel; Janicia Anderson
- Home arena: DeGol Arena

2017–18 Northeast Conference women's basketball standings
	Conf.				Overall
Team	W		L	PCT	W		L	PCT
Robert Morris	16	–	2	.889	25	–	8	.758
Saint Francis (PA) †	16	–	2	.889	24	–	10	.706
Sacred Heart	9	–	9	.500	14	–	17	.452
St. Francis Brooklyn	9	–	9	.500	13	–	17	.433
LIU Brooklyn	8	–	10	.444	13	–	18	.419
Bryant	8	–	10	.444	9	–	21	.300
Fairleigh Dickinson	7	–	11	.389	15	–	15	.500
Central Connecticut	7	–	11	.389	7	–	23	.233
Mount St. Mary's	6	–	12	.333	9	–	20	.310
Wagner	4	–	14	.222	6	–	23	.207
† 2018 NEC tournament winner As of March 17, 2018; Rankings from AP poll

The 2017–18 Saint Francis Red Flash women's basketball team represented Saint Francis University during the 2017–18 NCAA Division I women's basketball season. The Red Flash's home games were played at the DeGol Arena. The team was a member of the Northeast Conference and was led by Joe Haigh, who was in his sixth year at the helm. They finished the season 24–10, 16–2 in NEC play to win the Northeast Regular Season Championship with Robert Morris. They were also champions of the NEC tournament and earned an automatic trip to the NCAA women's basketball tournament, where they lost to the unbeaten UConn in the first round.

== Roster ==
2017–18 Saint Francis Red Flash women's basketball team
Players
Coaches

Pos.	#	Name	Height	Year	Previous school	Hometown
G	2	Caitlyn Kroll	5 ft 10 in (1.78 m)	RS Fr	Bridgeport	Bridgeport, OH
G	3	Karson Swogger	5 ft 8 in (1.73 m)	Fr	Bellwood-Antis	Bellwood, PA
G/F	10	Leah Morrow	5 ft 9 in (1.75 m)	Fr	Columbus Africentric	Columbus, OH
G	12	Jenna Mastellone	5 ft 10 in (1.78 m)	Fr	Archbishop Molloy	New York, NY
G	13	Sam Sabino	5 ft 9 in (1.75 m)	RS So	Rumson Fair Haven	Rumson, NJ
G	15	Maya Wynn	5 ft 11 in (1.8 m)	Sr	McDonogh	Reisterstown, MD
G	20	Caitlin Carroll	5 ft 9 in (1.75 m)	So	Red Bank Catholic	Middletown, NJ
G/F	21	AJ Timbers (redshirt)	6 ft 0 in (1.83 m)	Jr	Neumann Gorretti; Towson	Philadelphia, PA
F	22	Jillian Scott	5 ft 11 in (1.8 m)	So	Forest Hills	Summerhill, PA
G	23	Jessica Kovatch	5 ft 9 in (1.75 m)	Jr	Phillipsburg	Phillipsburg, NJ
F	24	Kyasia Duling	6 ft 3 in (1.91 m)	RS Sr	New Albany	Zanesville, OH
F	30	Jill Falvey	6 ft 0 in (1.83 m)	Jr	Middletown South	Lincroft, NJ
F/C	32	Courtney Zezza	6 ft 4 in (1.93 m)	Jr	Plum	Plum, PA
F/C	33	Cydney Smith	6 ft 3 in (1.91 m)	RS Sr	St. Mary's Ryken	Port Tobacco, MD
F	34	Ace Harrison	6 ft 2 in (1.88 m)	RS Sr	Digital Harbor; Maryland	Baltimore, MD
G/F	51	Haley Thomas	5 ft 11 in (1.8 m)	Fr	Bishop McCort	Hooversville, PA

Head coach

- Joe Haigh (Notre Dame)

Assistant coach(es)

- Kyle Hejmowski (Canisius)
- Vanessa Abel (Duquesne)
- Janicia Anderson (Wilberforce)

Legend

- (C) Team captain
- (S) Suspended
- (I) Ineligible
- (W) Walk-on
- Injured
- Current redshirt

Roster
Last update: March 13, 2018

== Schedule and results ==
Date time, TV	Rank^{#}	Opponent^{#}	Result	Record	Site (attendance) city, state
Exhibition
11/02/2017*; 7:00 PM		Pittsburgh–Johnstown	W 94–60		DeGol Arena (700); Loretto, PA
Non-conference regular season
11/10/2017*; 7:00 PM, ESPN3		at Toledo; Preseason WNIT First Round	L 66–74	0–1	Savage Arena (3,740); Toledo, OH
11/17/2017*; 12:00 PM		vs. Southeast Missouri State; Preseason WNIT Consolation Round	L 50–82	0–2	EagleBank Arena (134); Fairfax, VA
11/18/2017*; 12:00 PM		vs. Old Dominion; Preseason WNIT Consolation Round	W 79–68	1–2	EagleBank Arena (177); Fairfax, VA
11/21/2017*; 11:00 AM		Seton Hill	W 103–71	2–2	DeGol Arena (1,012); Loretto, PA
11/27/2017*; 7:00 PM		Cincinnati	W 77–73	3–2	Cincinnati State Gym (300); Cincinnati, OH
11/30/2017*; 7:00 PM		at Duquesne	L 68–87	3–3	Palumbo Center (631); Pittsburgh, PA
12/02/2017*; 2:00 PM		William & Mary	L 86–92	3–3	DeGol Arena (1,021); Loretto, PA
12/06/2017*; 7:00 PM, ILDN		at Columbia	L 81–94	3–4	Levien Gymnasium (257); New York, NY
12/09/2017*; 2:00 PM		Youngstown State	W 79–65	4–4	DeGol Arena (437); Loretto, PA
12/17/2017*; 5:00 PM		at Gonzaga	L 74–97	4–5	McCarthey Athletic Center (5,438); Spokane, WA
12/20/2017*; 4:00 PM		at Portland	W 106–101 ^{2OT}	5–5	Chiles Center (380); Portland, OR
12/21/2017*; 7:30 PM		at Boise State	L 59–87	5–6	Taco Bell Arena (476); Boise, ID
NEC Regular Season
12/29/2017; 1:00 PM		at Sacred Heart	W 89–48	6–6 (1–0)	William H. Pitt Center (177); Fairfield, CT
12/31/2017; 2:00 PM		at Fairleigh Dickinson	W 80–56	7–6 (2–0)	Rothman Center (201); Teaneck, NJ
01/06/2018; 1:00 PM		St. Francis Brooklyn	W 90–75	8–6 (3–0)	DeGol Arena (303); Loretto, PA
01/08/2018; 6:00 PM		LIU Brooklyn	W 101–71	9–6 (4–0)	DeGol Arena (225); Loretto, PA
01/13/2018; 2:00 PM		at Robert Morris	L 62–63	9–7 (4–1)	RMU North Athletic Complex (489); Moon Township, PA
01/20/2018; 2:00 PM		Mount St. Mary's	W 92–88 ^{OT}	10–7 (5–1)	DeGol Arena (604); Loretto, PA
01/22/2018; 7:00 PM		at Wagner	W 79–76	11–7 (6–1)	Spiro Sports Center (269); Staten Island, NY
01/27/2018; 2:00 PM		Central Connecticut	W 87–59	12–7 (7–1)	DeGol Arena (623); Loretto, PA
01/29/2018; 6:00 PM		Bryant	W 87–69	13–7 (8–1)	DeGol Arena (439); Loretto, PA
02/03/2018; 2:00 PM		Robert Morris	W 68–47	14–7 (9–1)	DeGol Arena (998); Loretto, PA
02/10/2018; 1:00 PM		at St. Francis Brooklyn	W 80–56	15–7 (10–1)	Generoso Pope Athletic Complex (405); Brooklyn, NY
02/12/2018; 7:00 PM		at LIU Brooklyn	W 85–54	16–7 (11–1)	Steinberg Wellness Center (425); Brooklyn, NY
02/17/2018; 4:00 PM		Sacred Heart	L 68–69	16–8 (11–2)	DeGol Arena (958); Loretto, PA
02/19/2017; 6:00 PM		Fairleigh Dickinson	W 80–61	17–8 (12–2)	DeGol Arena (427); Loretto, PA
02/24/2018; 1:00 PM		at Central Connecticut	W 85–75	18–8 (13–2)	William H. Detrick Gymnasium; New Britain, CT
02/26/2018; 7:00 PM, ESPN3		at Bryant	W 94–78	19–8 (14–2)	Chace Athletic Center (315); Smithfield, RI
03/02/2018; 7:00 PM		at Mount St. Mary's	W 79–69	20–8 (15–2)	Knott Arena (290); Emmitsburg, PA
03/04/2018; 2:00 PM		Wagner	W 92–88	21–8 (16–2)	DeGol Arena (468); Loretto, PA
NEC Women's Tournament
03/07/2018; 5:00 PM	(1)	(8) Fairleigh Dickinson; Quarterfinals	W 89–70	22–9	DeGol Arena (381); Loretto, PA
03/08/2018; 5:00 PM, ESPN3	(1)	(4) Sacred Heart; Semifinals	W 78–47	23–9	DeGol Arena (536); Loretto, PA
03/11/2018; 2:00 PM, ESPNU	(1)	(2) Robert Morris; Championship Game	W 66–56	24–9	DeGol Arena (1,161); Loretto, PA
NCAA Women's Tournament
03/17/2018*; 11:00 AM, ESPN2	(16 A)	at (1 A) No. 1 Connecticut; First Round	L 52–140	24–10	Harry A. Gampel Pavilion (6,154); Storrs, CT
*Non-conference game. ^{#}Rankings from AP Poll. (#) Tournament seedings in parentheses. A=Albany Region. All times are in Eastern Time.

== See also ==
- 2017–18 Saint Francis Red Flash men's basketball team
