= Amy Vachon =

American basketball player and coach

Current position
- Title: Head coach
- Team: Maine
- Conference: America East
- Record: 188–107

Biographical details
- Born: August 23, 1978 (age 48)

Playing career
- 1996–2000: Maine
- Position: Point guard

Coaching career (HC unless noted)
- 2011–2017: Maine (asst.)
- 2017–present: Maine

Head coaching record
- Overall: 188–107

Accomplishments and honors

Championships
- 3x America East tournament (2018, 2019, 2024); 5× America East regular season (2018, 2019, 2021, 2022, 2024)

Awards
- 5x America East Coach of the Year (2018, 2019, 2021, 2022, 2024)

Amy Vachon (born August 23, 1978) is an American basketball coach and former player. A long-time assistant at the University of Maine, Vachon took over as head coach following Richard Barron's medical absence began on January 6. As interim head coach, Vachon led the 2016–17 Lady Black Bears to an 11–6 record, including a trip to the finals of the 2017 America East women's basketball tournament. In April 2017, she was named interim head coach for the 2017–18 season. Following the end of the regular season, one in which Maine was named the America East conference regular season champion, Vachon was named Maine's permanent head coach.

== Playing career ==
Vachon attended Cony High School and was twice Gatorade Player of the Year. Vachon is the daughter of long-time Cony high school head coach Paul Vachon. While in high school, Vachon played on two-state championships teams and was a four-year All-State Basketball Selection and a two-time Gatorade Player of the Year. Vachon was honored as Miss Maine Basketball and the High School Athlete of the Year in 1996. She spent four seasons as a player at Maine, during which time she became one of the all-time assists leaders in women's college basketball history. Vachon, who was inducted into the Maine Sports Hall of Fame in 2016, holds the Maine and America East records for the most assists in a season (234) and in a career (759). When hired in 2011, she ranked 22nd all-time in NCAA history in career assists. Vachon earned a spot on the America East All-Tournament Team in 1999.

== Career statistics ==
Legend
GP	Games played	GS	Games started	MPG	Minutes per game	RPG	Rebounds per game
APG	Assists per game	SPG	Steals per game	BPG	Blocks per game	PPG	Points per game
TO	Turnovers per game	FG%	Field-goal percentage	3P%	3-point field-goal percentage	FT%	Free-throw percentage
**Bold**	Career best	°	League leader

=== College ===
Year	Team	GP	GS	MPG	FG%	3P%	FT%	RPG	APG	SPG	BPG	TO	PPG
1996–97	Maine	30	-	-	45.3	35.8	48.8	3.5	4.1	2.0	**0.1**	-	5.4
1997–98	Maine	30	-	-	**46.6**	**37.0**	59.5	3.8	6.5	2.3	**0.1**	-	6.5
1998–99	Maine	29	-	-	44.0	33.3	60.2	**4.2**	**8.1**	**2.5**	0.0	-	8.6
1999–2000	Maine	**31**	-	-	40.6	34.5	**64.6**	3.7	6.7	**2.5**	0.0	-	**9.9**
**Career**		120	-	-	43.5	34.9	59.8	3.8	6.3	2.3	0.1	-	7.6
Statistics retrieved from Sports-Reference.

== Head coaching record ==
Record table
Season	Team	Overall	Conference	Standing	Postseason
**Maine Black Bears** (America East Conference) (2017–present)
2016–17	Maine	11–7^{‡}	9–6	4th	
2017–18	Maine	23–10	13–3	1st	NCAA First Round
2018–19	Maine	25–8	15–1	1st	NCAA First Round
2019–20	Maine	18–14	12–4	2nd	
2020–21	Maine	17–3	13–2	1st	
2021–22	Maine	20–12	15–3	1st	WNIT First Round
2022–23	Maine	16–14	11–5	3rd	
2023–24	Maine	24–10	14–2	1st	NCAA First Round
2024–25	Maine	15–16	9–7	3rd	
2025–26	Maine	19–13	12–4	2nd	
Maine:		188–107 (.637)	123–37 (.769)	‡ Interim basis after Richard Barron took a medical leave of absence.	
Total:		188–107 (.637)			
National champion Postseason invitational champion Conference regular season champion Conference regular season and conference tournament champion Division regular season champion Division regular season and conference tournament champion Conference tournament champion
