= Richard Barron (basketball) =

American basketball coach (born 1969)

Biographical details
- Born: February 3, 1969 (age 57)

Playing career
- 1988–1991: Kenyon

Coaching career (HC unless noted)
- 1992–1996: Sewanee (men's asst.)
- 1996–2001: Sewanee (women's)
- 2001–2007: Princeton (women's)
- 2007–2009: Baylor (women's asst.)
- 2009–2011: NC State (women's asst.)
- 2011–2017: Maine (women's)
- 2018–2022: Maine (men's)

Head coaching record
- Overall: 21–75 (.219) (men's); 236–228 (.509) (women's)

Richard Barron (born February 3, 1969) is an American basketball coach who was most recently the head coach of the University of Maine men's basketball team. Barron previously served as the head coach of Maine's women's basketball team from 2011 to 2017 before taking a leave of absence, due to medical issues. Barron is one of the few people to coach both a men's and women's basketball at the NCAA Division I level.

== Coaching career ==
Barron got his start in coaching at the high school ranks at Providence Day School as an assistant boys' varsity coach, while also working at the school as a science teacher. He entered college coaching as an assistant men's basketball coach at Sewanee from 1993 to 1996 before taking over as the head women's basketball coach for the Tigers. Barron compiled a 77–48 overall record with Sewanee, leading the school to its first-ever conference championship. He was then named the head women's basketball coach at Princeton, where he posted a 71–91 overall record and led the Tigers to a share of the 2005–06 Ivy League title.

After Princeton, Barron became an associate head coach under Kim Mulkey at Baylor from 2007 to 2009 and spent 2009 to 2011 as a women's basketball assistant at NC State.

=== Maine women's basketball ===
On May 10, 2011, Barron became the head women's basketball coach at Maine, where he replaced Cindy Blodgett. In his time with the women's program, Barron helped the Black Bears earn two America East women's basketball regular season titles, and two postseason appearances, while earning America East Coach of the Year honors in 2015. For his efforts, he signed a four-year contract extension with the school in 2016.

In January 2017, Barron took a leave of absence from Maine due to illness and was replaced on an interim basis by assistant coach Amy Vachon. Six months later, he had a successful craniotomy at Ronald Reagan UCLA Medical Center in Los Angeles, California. Barron returned to Maine as a special assistant to the director of athletics, in which he assisted with athletic department functions and fundraising, while Vachon continued to coach the women's team on an interim basis.

=== Maine men's basketball ===
On March 2, 2018, Vachon was named the full-time women's basketball coach at Maine, and Barron was named the men's basketball coach, replacing Bob Walsh.

Barron went 21–76 in just under four seasons at the helm, but parted ways with the school on February 17, 2022.

== Head coaching record ==
=== Women's ===
Record table
Season	Team	Overall	Conference	Standing	Postseason
Sewanee Tigers (Southern Collegiate Athletic Conference) (1996–2001)
1996–97	Sewanee	13–12	4–10	6th	
1997–98	Sewanee	11–14	4–10	7th	
1998–99	Sewanee	15–10	12–6	4th	
1999–00	Sewanee	20–5	14–4	3rd	
2000–01	Sewanee	18–7	14–4	T–1st	
Sewanee:		77–48 (.616)	48–34 (.585)		
Princeton Tigers (Ivy League) (2001–2007)
2001–02	Princeton	11–16	5–9	7th	
2002–03	Princeton	9–19	4–10	T–5th	
2003–04	Princeton	7–20	4–10	7th	
2004–05	Princeton	13–14	5–9	T–5th	
2005–06	Princeton	21–7	12–2	T–1st	
2006–07	Princeton	13–15	7–7	T–4th	
Princeton:		74–91 (.448)	37–47 (.440)		
Maine Black Bears (America East Conference) (2011–2017)
2011–12	Maine	8–23	4–12	8th	
2012–13	Maine	4–24	3–12	9th	
2013–14	Maine	17–15	10–6	4th	
2014–15	Maine	23–9	14–2	1st	WNIT First Round
2015–16	Maine	26–9	15–1	T–1st	WNIT First Round
2016–17	Maine	7–9^{‡}	0–1	4th	
Maine:		85–93 (.489)	46–34 (.575)	‡ Medical leave of absence, Vachon took over on interim basis.	
Total:		236–228 (.509)			
National champion Postseason invitational champion Conference regular season champion Conference regular season and conference tournament champion Division regular season champion Division regular season and conference tournament champion Conference tournament champion

=== Men's ===
Record table
Season	Team	Overall	Conference	Standing	Postseason
Maine Black Bears (America East Conference) (2018–2022)
2018–19	Maine	5–27	3–13	8th	
2019–20	Maine	9–21	5–11	8th	
2020–21	Maine	2–7	2–6	10th	
2021–22	Maine	5–20	2–12		
Maine:		21–75 (.219)	12–42 (.222)		
Total:		21–75 (.219)			
