= Cross Insurance Center =

Arena in Bangor, Maine, U.S.

- Cross Center

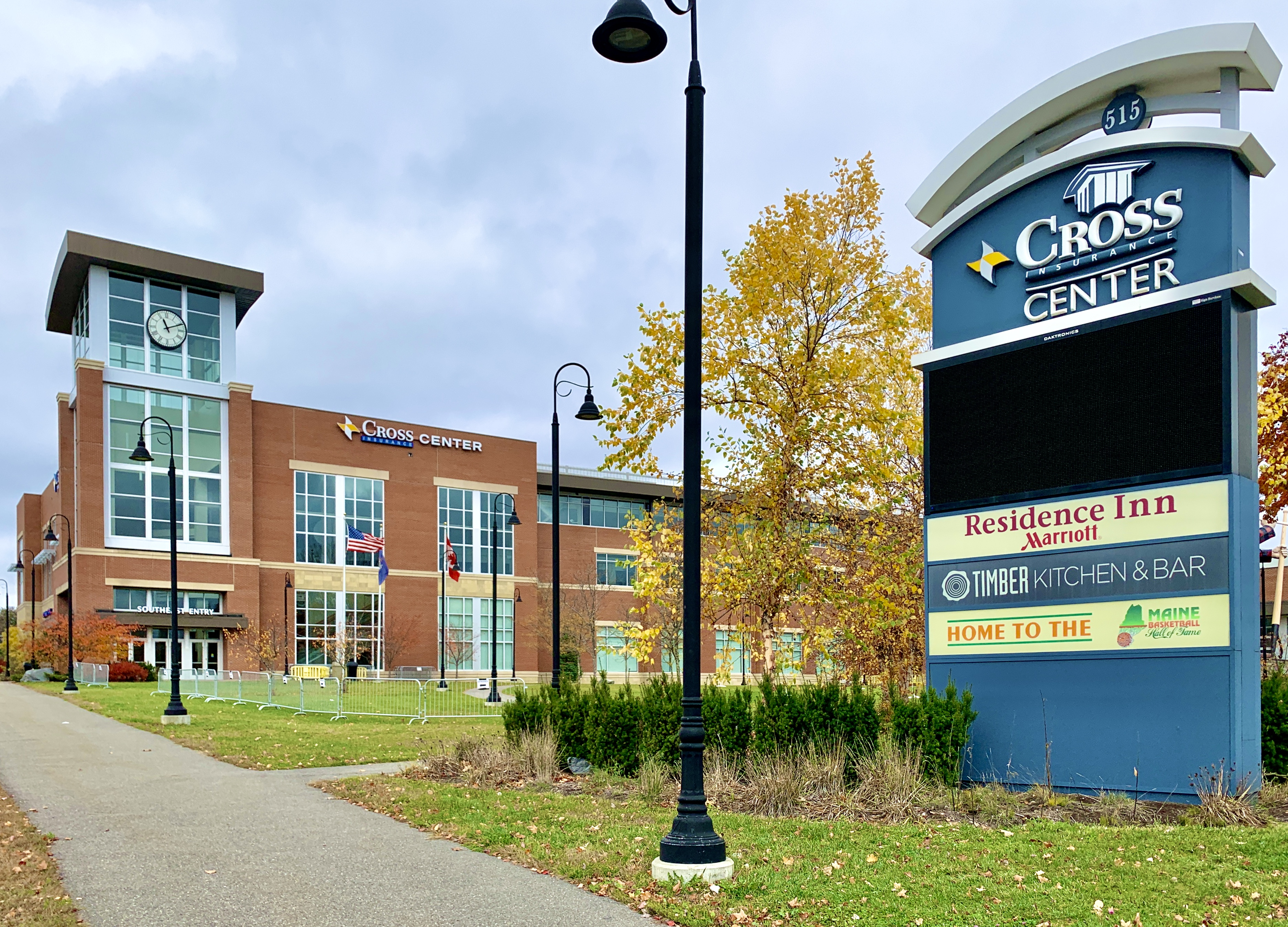
- Interactive map of Cross Insurance Center
- Former names: Bangor Arena
- Location: 515 Main Street; Bangor, Maine
- Coordinates: 44°47′21″N 68°46′45″W
- Owner: City of Bangor
- Operator: Spectra
- Capacity: Seats: 5,800 (plus 1,500 retractable); Concerts: 8,500; Convention: 2,000
- Surface: Multi-surface

Construction
- Groundbreaking: August 4, 2011
- Opened: September 10, 2013
- Cost: $65 million ($89.8 million in 2025 dollars)
- Architects: Sink Combs Dethlefs; WBRC Architects Engineers
- Structural engineers: Martin/Martin, Inc.
- Services engineers: M–E Engineers, Inc.
- General contractor: Cianbro Corporation

Tenant
- University of Maine Black Bears

Website
- crossinsurancecenter.com

The Cross Insurance Center is a 5,800-seat multi-purpose arena in Bangor, Maine, United States. The arena holds up to 8,500 people for concerts, and features an attached 2,000-person convention center. It was built at an estimated cost of $65 million. Part of the city's Bass Park complex, it is located across from Hollywood Casino Bangor. It is the home of the basketball teams of the Maine Black Bears.

== History ==
The Bangor Auditorium was a 5,948-seat multipurpose arena located in downtown Bangor. It became a statewide icon by hosting the Maine Principals' Association basketball tournament each February, which is broadcast by the Maine Public Broadcasting Network.

Beginning sometime in the late 2000s, the city began discussing replacing the arena. In May 2011, the city held a public referendum in which voters supported building new facilities to replace the Auditorium and Civic Center by a margin of 3 to 1.

Demolition began at the Bangor Auditorium and Civic Center on June 3, 2013, with the new arena completed.

The facility is managed by Spectra, a division of Comcast. On July 20, 2012, it was announced that Cross Insurance Agency had purchased naming rights to the arena (previously referred to only as "Bangor Arena") for $3 million.

On July 31, 2013, the University of Maine announced that the Maine Black Bears basketball teams would play "over half" of their games at the new arena.

== Noted performers ==
- The Band Perry
- John Fogerty
- Brantley Gilbert
- Mannheim Steamroller
- Megadeth
- Brad Paisley
- Queens of the Stone Age
- Bob Seger
- Ringo Starr
- Mötley Crüe
- James Taylor
- Frankie Valli
- Elton John
- Brian Wilson
- Polo G
- Trippie Redd
- NLE Choppa
- The Kid LAROI

== Events ==
- UFC Fight Night: Bader vs. Saint Preux

== See also ==
- Alfond Arena at the University of Maine in nearby Orono
