= Abbey Hsu =

American basketball player (born 2001)

Free agent
- Position: Guard

Personal information
- Born: March 22, 2001 (age 25) Boca Raton, Florida, U.S.
- Listed height: 5 ft 11 in (1.80 m)

Career information
- High school: Marjory Stoneman Douglas (Parkland, Florida); St. Thomas Aquinas (Fort Lauderdale, Florida)
- College: Columbia (2019–2024)
- WNBA draft: 2024: 3rd round, 34th overall pick
- Drafted by: Connecticut Sun
- Playing career: 2024–present

Career history
- 2024: BC Namur-Capitale

Career highlights
- Ivy League Player of the Year (2024); 2× First-team All-Ivy League (2023, 2024); 2× Second-team All-Ivy League (2020, 2022)
- Stats at Basketball Reference
Medals
Women's basketball
Representing United States
FIBA AmeriCup
Silver medal – second place	2023 Mexico	Team
Women's 3x3 basketball
Representing United States
FIBA 3x3 AmeriCup
Silver medal – second place	2024 San Juan	Team

Abigail Victoria Hsu (born March 22, 2001) is an American professional basketball player who is currently a free agent. She played college basketball for the Columbia Lions. Hsu played for Marjory Stoneman Douglas High School in Parkland, Florida before transferring to St. Thomas Aquinas High School in Fort Lauderdale, Florida. She was named Ivy League Player of the Year as a senior in college, set the Ivy League career record in three-pointers and left as Columbia's all-time leader in points and three-pointers. She was selected 34th overall in the 2024 WNBA draft by the Connecticut Sun.

== High school career ==
Hsu played basketball for Marjory Stoneman Douglas High School in Parkland, Florida for three years. During her sophomore season, she averaged 15 points, 8.5 rebounds, 6 steals, and 5.5 assists per game, leading her team to a 26–3 record, the best in program history, a district title, and its first regional finals appearance. Hsu was named to the All-Broward County first team by the Miami Herald. As a junior, she averaged 18 points, 10 rebounds, and 5 assists per game before suffering a torn ACL in her right knee on February 7, 2018. One week later, Hsu was on the school's campus during a mass shooting. For her senior season, she transferred to St. Thomas Aquinas High School and was cleared to play before the season. Hsu averaged 14 points, 8 rebounds, and 4 assists per game, helping her team reach the Class 8A state championship game and win district and regional titles. She committed to playing college basketball for Columbia over offers from other major programs, including Alabama and Pittsburgh.

== College career ==
On February 15, 2020, Hsu scored a freshman season-high 31 points in an 89–64 win over Harvard, the most points in a game by a Columbia freshman since Tori Oliver in 2014. As a freshman, she averaged 14.3 points and 5.1 rebounds per game, leading the Ivy League in three-point percentage (.411). Hsu was named second-team All-Ivy League and All-Met Rookie of the Year. The 2020 Ivy League tournament, where her team was set to make its first tournament appearance, was canceled and her team did not play in the 2020–21 season due to the COVID-19 pandemic. In the first round of the 2022 Women's National Invitation Tournament (WNIT), Hsu scored 24 points and set the Ivy League single-season record and program career record for three-pointers, helping her team defeat Holy Cross, 80–69. As a sophomore, she averaged 16.4 points and 4.6 rebounds per game, earning second-team All-Ivy League honors.

On December 10, 2022, Hsu scored 34 points and made a program-record nine three-pointers in an 83–74 win over UMass. On February 17, 2023, she scored a career-high 35 points in a 75–70 win against Harvard. Hsu led Columbia to its first Ivy League regular-season title and was a unanimous first-team All-Ivy League selection. She helped her team reach the 2023 WNIT final. Hsu averaged 17.8 points, 4.4 rebounds and 2.4 assists per game as a junior, ranking second in the nation in three-pointers per game (3.3). She made the Women's Basketball Coaches Association (WBCA) Division I Coaches' All-America honorable mention. In her senior season, Hsu averaged 20.4 points, 7.3 rebounds and 2.1 assists per game, and was named Ivy League Player of the Year and All-Met Player of the Year, while earning All-American honorable mention from the Associated Press and WBCA. She broke the program single-season and career scoring records. Hsu finished her career with the most three-pointers and third-most points by a player in Ivy League history.

== Professional career ==
Hsu was selected by the Connecticut Sun with the 34th overall pick in the 2024 WNBA draft, but did not attend training camp or play during the 2024 season. The Sun reserved her rights for future seasons. She became the first Columbia player ever to be drafted into the WNBA.

In 2024, she signed with BC Namur-Capitale a basketball club in Namur, Belgium.

On February 17, 2025, Hsu signed a rookie scale contract with the Connecticut Sun. On April 28, she was waived by the team.

== National team career ==
Hsu was named to the United States national team for the 2023 FIBA Women's AmeriCup in Mexico. She became the second Ivy League player to compete for the senior national team. Hsu averaged 1.8 points per game in the tournament, as her team won the silver medal.

== Career statistics ==
Legend
GP	Games played	GS	Games started	MPG	Minutes per game	RPG	Rebounds per game
APG	Assists per game	SPG	Steals per game	BPG	Blocks per game	PPG	Points per game
TO	Turnovers per game	FG%	Field-goal percentage	3P%	3-point field-goal percentage	FT%	Free-throw percentage
**Bold**	Career best	°	League leader

=== College ===
Year	Team	GP	GS	MPG	FG%	3P%	FT%	RPG	APG	SPG	BPG	TO	PPG
2019–20	Columbia	27	27	32.6	**45.7**	**41.1**	61.5	5.1	1.5	**1.5**	0.5	2.4	14.3
2020–21	Columbia	Season cancelled due to COVID-19 pandemic											
2021–22	Columbia	32	32	33.3	39.3	37.5	73.5	4.6	1.7	1.1	**0.8**	2.3	16.4
2022–23	Columbia	**34**	**34**	**34.3**	41.6	37.7	**76.0**	4.4	**2.4**	1.2	0.4	**2.1**	17.8
2023–24	Columbia	30	30	34.2	44.6	38.8	75.2	**7.3**	2.1	1.1	0.5	2.2	**20.4**
**Career**		123	123	33.6	42.5	38.5	73.0	5.3	1.9	1.2	0.5	2.2	17.3

== Personal life ==
Hsu is the daughter of Theresa and Alex Hsu and is the youngest of seven siblings. Her father was a doctor specializing in internal medicine who died of COVID-19, becoming the first medical professional in South Florida to die of the disease.
