= 2017–18 Dartmouth Big Green women's basketball team =

Intercollegiate basketball season

2017–18 Dartmouth Big Green women's basketball
- Conference: Ivy League
- Record: 15–12 (7–7 Ivy)
- Head coach: Belle Koclanes (5th season)
- Assistant coaches: Addie Micir; Taja Edwards; Steve Harney
- Home arena: Leede Arena

2017–18 Ivy League women's basketball standings
	Conf.				Overall
Team	W		L	PCT	W		L	PCT
Princeton †	12	–	2	.857	24	–	6	.800
Penn	11	–	3	.786	22	–	9	.710
Harvard	10	–	4	.714	18	–	11	.621
Yale	8	–	6	.571	19	–	13	.594
Dartmouth	7	–	7	.500	15	–	12	.556
Brown	3	–	11	.214	15	–	12	.556
Cornell	3	–	11	.214	7	–	20	.259
Columbia	2	–	12	.143	8	–	21	.276
† 2018 Ivy League Tournament winner Rankings from AP Poll

The 2017–18 Dartmouth Big Green women's basketball team represented Dartmouth College during the 2017–18 NCAA Division I women's basketball season. The Big Green, led by fifth-year head coach Belle Koclanes, played their home games at Leede Arena in Hanover, New Hampshire as members of the Ivy League. They finished the season 15–12, 7–7 in Ivy League play, to finish in fifth place and failed to qualify for the Ivy League women's tournament.

== Roster ==
2017–18 Dartmouth Big Green women's basketball team
Players
Coaches

Pos.	#	Name	Height	Year	Previous school	Hometown
G	1	Cy Lippold	5 ft 2 in (1.57 m)	Jr	Blair Academy	East Stroudsburg, PA
G	2	Annie McKenna	5 ft 5 in (1.65 m)	So	Trinity	Elmwood Park, IL
C	3	Olivia Smith	6 ft 2 in (1.88 m)	Sr	Catherine McAuley	Yarmouth, ME
G	5	Grace Phillips	6 ft 0 in (1.83 m)	So	Bishop Shanahan	Downingtown, PA
G	14	Kate Letkewicz	6 ft 0 in (1.83 m)	Sr	Waterloo West	Waterloo, IA
F	15	Anna Luce	6 ft 2 in (1.88 m)	Fr	Mercer Island	Mercer Island, WA
G	21	Kealy Brown	5 ft 8 in (1.73 m)	Jr	Liberty	Henderson, NV
F	25	Isalys Quiñones	6 ft 3 in (1.91 m)	Jr	Otay Ranch	Chula Vista, CA
F	31	Emily Dryden	6 ft 3 in (1.91 m)	Jr	Mullen	Lakewood, CO
G	32	Emily Slangle	5 ft 10 in (1.78 m)	Sr	Martin	Arlington, TX
F	33	Andi Norman	6 ft 0 in (1.83 m)	Sr	Upper Arlington	Upper Arlington, OH
G	35	Elle Louie	5 ft 10 in (1.78 m)	Fr	Miramonte	Orinda, CA
G/F	52	Paula Lenart	5 ft 11 in (1.8 m)	So	Northfield Mount Hermon	Covasna, Romania

Head coach

- Belle Koclanes (Richmond)

Assistant coach(es)

- Addie Micir (Princeton)
- Taja Edwards (Fresno State)
- Steve Harney (Dickinson)

Legend

- (C) Team captain
- (S) Suspended
- (I) Ineligible
- (W) Walk-on
- Injured
- Current redshirt

Roster
Last update: February 20, 2025

== Schedule ==
Date time, TV	Rank^{#}	Opponent^{#}	Result	Record	Site (attendance) city, state
Non-conference regular season
November 10, 2017*; 7:30 p.m., ILDN		Vermont	W 66–56	1–0	Leede Arena (563); Hanover, NH
November 12, 2017*; 2:00 p.m., ILDN		Boston College	W 68–57	2–0	Leede Arena (537); Hanover, NH
November 24, 2017*; 4:00 p.m., ILDN		Rhode Island	W 70–54	3–0	Leede Arena (427); Hanover, NH
November 26, 2017*; 2:00 p.m., ILDN		NJIT	W 81–50	4–0	Leede Arena (585); Hanover, NH
November 29, 2017*; 7:00 p.m.		at Army	L 56–71	4–1	Christl Arena (460); West Point, NY
December 2, 2017*; 7:00 p.m.		at Marist	W 60–51	5–1	McCann Field House (1,508); Poughkeepsie, NY
December 5, 2017*; 11:00 a.m., ILDN		New Hampshire; Rivalry	W 57–49	6–1	Leede Arena (1,170); Hanover, NH
December 9, 2017*; 12:00 p.m., ILDN		Maine	L 51–64	6–2	Leede Arena (571); Hanover, NH
December 11, 2017*; 9:00 p.m.		at Colorado	W 81–75	7–2	Coors Events Center (1,651); Boulder, CO
December 15, 2017*; 7:00 p.m.		at No. 13 Ohio State	L 70–103	7–3	Value City Arena (5,086); Columbus, OH
December 20, 2017*; 11:00 a.m.		at Holy Cross	W 76–74 ^{OT}	8–3	Hart Center (2,312); Worcester, MA
December 30, 2017*; 2:00 p.m., ESPN3		at Albany	L 61–76	8–4	SEFCU Arena (1,036); Albany, NY
December 31, 2017*; 2:00 p.m.		at Binghamton	L 64–80	8–5	Binghamton University Events Center (1,441); Vestal, NY
Ivy League regular season
January 6, 2018; 5:00 p.m., ILDN		Harvard	W 63–56	9–5 (1–0)	Leede Arena (779); Hanover, NH
January 20, 2018; 6:00 p.m., ESPN3/ILDN		at Harvard	L 65–76	9–6 (1–1)	Lavietes Pavilion (872); Cambridge, MA
January 26, 2018; 7:00 p.m., ESPN3/ILDN		Brown	W 78–73	10–6 (2–1)	Leede Arena (570); Hanover, NH
January 27, 2018; 5:00 p.m., ILDN		Yale	L 39–57	10–7 (2–2)	Leede Arena (1,098); Hanover, NH
February 2, 2018; 7:00 p.m., ESPN3/ILDN		Cornell	W 55–40	11–7 (3–2)	Leede Arena (467); Hanover, NH
February 3, 2018; 5:00 p.m., ILDN		Columbia	W 88–65	12–7 (4–2)	Leede Arena (807); Hanover, NH
February 9, 2018; 7:00 p.m., ILDN		at Penn	W 88–65	12–8 (4–3)	Palestra (807); Philadelphia, PA
February 10, 2018; 5:00 p.m., ILDN		at Princeton	L 63–82	12–9 (4–4)	Jadwin Gymnasium (1,091); Princeton, NJ
February 16, 2018; 6:00 p.m., ILDN		at Yale	W 64–62 ^{OT}	13–9 (5–4)	John J. Lee Amphitheater (291); New Haven, CT
February 17, 2018; 4:00 p.m., ILDN		at Brown	W 77–60	14–9 (6–4)	Pizzitola Sports Center (272); Providence, RI
February 23, 2018; 7:00 p.m., ESPN3/ILDN		Princeton	L 67–79	14–10 (6–5)	Leede Arena (796); Hanover, NH
February 24, 2018; 5:00 p.m., ILDN		Penn	L 50–79	14–11 (6–6)	Leede Arena (817); Hanover, NH
March 2, 2018; 7:00 p.m., SNY/ILDN		at Columbia; Postponed to March 3 (inclement weather)			Levien Gymnasium; New York, NY
March 3, 2018; 2:00 p.m., SNY/ILDN		at Columbia; Rescheduled from March 2	W 88–77	15–11 (7–6)	Levien Gymnasium (555); New York, NY
March 3, 2018; 5:00 p.m., ESPN3/ILDN		at Cornell; Postponed to March 4 (inclement weather)			Newman Arena; Ithaca, NY
March 4, 2018; 2:00 p.m., ILDN		at Cornell; Rescheduled from March 3	L 49–51	15–12 (7–7)	Newman Arena (178); Ithaca, NY
*Non-conference game. ^{#}Rankings from AP poll. (#) Tournament seedings in parentheses. All times are in Eastern.

== See also ==
- 2017–18 Dartmouth Big Green men's basketball team
