= 2017–18 Columbia Lions women's basketball team =

Intercollegiate basketball season

2017–18 Columbia Lions women's basketball
- Conference: Ivy League
- Record: 8–21 (2–12 Ivy)
- Head coach: Megan Griffith (2nd season)
- Assistant coaches: Greg Rosnick; Tyler Cordell; Kerry Connolly
- Home arena: Levien Gymnasium

2017–18 Ivy League women's basketball standings
	Conf.				Overall
Team	W		L	PCT	W		L	PCT
Princeton †	12	–	2	.857	24	–	6	.800
Penn	11	–	3	.786	22	–	9	.710
Harvard	10	–	4	.714	18	–	11	.621
Yale	8	–	6	.571	19	–	13	.594
Dartmouth	7	–	7	.500	15	–	12	.556
Brown	3	–	11	.214	15	–	12	.556
Cornell	3	–	11	.214	7	–	20	.259
Columbia	2	–	12	.143	8	–	21	.276
† 2018 Ivy League Tournament winner Rankings from AP Poll

The 2017–18 Columbia Lions women's basketball team represented Columbia University during the 2017–18 NCAA Division I women's basketball season. The Lions, led by second-year head coach Megan Griffith, played their home games at Levien Gymnasium and were members of the Ivy League. They finished the season 8–21, 2–12 in Ivy League play to finish in last place. They failed to qualify for the Ivy women's tournament.

== Previous season ==
They finished the season 13–14, 3–11 in Ivy League play to finish in a tie for seventh place.

== Roster ==
2017–18 Columbia Lions women's basketball team
Players
Coaches

Pos.	#	Name	Height	Year	Previous school	Hometown
G/F	0	Imani Whittington	5 ft 11 in (1.8 m)	Fr	Barking Abbey School	London, England
G	1	Janiya Clemmons	5 ft 9 in (1.75 m)	So	Bishop Denis J. O'Connell	Accokeek, MD
F	3	Josie Little	6 ft 2 in (1.88 m)	Jr	St. Ignatius College Prep	San Francisco, CA
G	4	Paige Tippet	5 ft 8 in (1.73 m)	Sr	Clear Springs	League City, TX
G	5	Riley Casey	5 ft 8 in (1.73 m)	Fr	Franklin Road Academy	Brentwood, TN
G	10	Andrea McCormick	5 ft 8 in (1.73 m)	Fr	Villa Maria Academy	Erie, PA
F	11	Sarah Elston	6 ft 3 in (1.91 m)	Jr	Loyola Academy	Bannockburn, IL
F	20	Camille Zimmerman	6 ft 1 in (1.85 m)	Sr	Tempe Preparatory Academy	Tempe, AZ
G	22	Maya Sampleton	5 ft 9 in (1.75 m)	So	St. Stephen's Episcopal	Austin, TX
G	25	Stephanie Flynn	5 ft 10 in (1.78 m)	So	Hanover	Hanover, MA
F/C	32	Madison Pack	6 ft 3 in (1.91 m)	Fr	Sarasota	Sarasota, FL
G	33	Abby Lee	5 ft 11 in (1.8 m)	Jr	West Monroe	West Monroe, LA
C	42	Jillian Borreson	6 ft 3 in (1.91 m)	Sr	Jack C. Hays	Mountain City, TX

Head coach

- Megan Griffith (Columbia)

Assistant coach(es)

- Greg Rosnick (Haverford)
- Tyler Cordell (Ohio Wesleyan)
- Kerry Connolly (Molloy)

Legend

- (C) Team captain
- (S) Suspended
- (I) Ineligible
- (W) Walk-on
- Injured
- Current redshirt

Roster
Last update: December 29, 2017

2017-18 Ivy Awards and Recognition
- Camille Zimmerman – First Team All-Ivy

== Schedule ==
Date time, TV	Rank^{#}	Opponent^{#}	Result	Record	Site (attendance) city, state
Non-conference regular season
November 10, 2017*; 3:30 pm		at Providence	W 73–64	1–0	Alumni Hall (231); Providence, RI
November 12, 2017*; 2:30 pm, ILDN		Richmond	L 79–85	1–1	Levien Gymnasium (418); New York, NY
November 15, 2017*; 5:00 pm, ESPN3		at UMass Lowell	L 70–77	1–2	Costello Athletic Center (718); Lowell, MA
November 19, 2017*; 2:00 pm, ESPN3		at Vermont	W 73–66	2–2	Patrick Gym (456); Burlington, VT
November 23, 2017*; 11:00 am		vs. Green Bay; Cancún Challenge	L 43–61	2–3	Hard Rock Hotel Riviera Maya (982); Cancún, Mexico
November 24, 2017*; 11:00 am		vs. No. 7 Mississippi State; Cancún Challenge	L 54–90	2–4	Hard Rock Hotel Riviera Maya; Cancún, Mexico
November 25, 2017*; 12:30 pm		vs. No. 24 Arizona State; Cancún Challenge	L 48–72	2–5	Hard Rock Hotel Riviera Maya (982); Cancún, Mexico
November 29, 2017*; 11:00 am, SNY/ILDN		Boston College	W 68–60	3–5	Levien Gymnasium (2,372); New York, NY
December 3, 2017*; 1:00 pm, ESPN3		at UMBC	W 60–44	4–5	Retriever Activities Center (318); Catonsville, MD
December 6, 2017*; 7:00 pm, ILDN		Saint Francis (PA)	W 94–81	5–5	Levien Gymnasium (257); New York, NY
December 9, 2017*; 2:00 pm, ILDN		Buffalo	L 63–65	5–6	Levien Gymnasium (371); New York, NY
December 11, 2017*; 7:00 pm, SNY/ILDN		Hofstra	W 73–53	6–6	Levien Gymnasium (325); New York, NY
December 28, 2017*; 6:00 pm		at Houston	L 53–77	6–7	H&PE Arena (522); Houston, TX
December 30, 2017*; 3:00 pm, ESPN3		at Rice	L 44–67	6–8	Tudor Fieldhouse (802); Houston, TX
January 3, 2018*; 6:00 pm		at Hampton	L 58–60	6–9	Hampton Convocation Center (2,123); Hampton, VA
Ivy League regular season
January 12, 2018; 5:30 pm, ILDN		at Princeton	L 47–69	6–10 (0–1)	Jadwin Gymnasium (679); Princeton, NJ
January 13, 2018; 4:30 pm, ILDN		at Penn	L 51–70	6–11 (0–2)	The Palestra (2,084); Philadelphia, PA
January 20, 2018; 4:00 pm, SNY/ILDN		Cornell	L 47–57	6–12 (0–3)	Levien Gymnasium (921); New York, NY
January 27, 2018; 1:00 pm, ILDN		at Cornell	W 72–54	7–12 (1–3)	Newman Arena; Ithaca, NY
February 2, 2018; 6:00 pm, NESN+/ILDN		at Harvard	L 67–85	7–13 (1–4)	Lavietes Pavilion (1,102); Cambridge, MA
February 3, 2018; 5:00 pm, ILDN		at Dartmouth	L 65–88	7–14 (1–5)	Leede Arena (807); Hanover, NH
February 9, 2018; 7:00 pm, SNY/ILDN		Yale	L 50–73	7–15 (1–6)	Levien Gymnasium (412); New York, NY
February 10, 2018; 5:00 pm, ILDN		Brown	L 80–84	7–16 (1–7)	Levien Gymnasium (512); New York, NY
February 16, 2018; 4:00 pm, SNY/ILDN		Penn	L 39–75	7–17 (1–8)	Levien Gymnasium (472); New York, NY
February 17, 2018; 4:30 pm, SNY/ILDN		Princeton	L 46–74	7–18 (1–9)	Levien Gymnasium (469); New York, NY
February 23, 2018; 6:00 pm, ESPN/ILDN		at Brown	W 90–74	8–18 (2–9)	Pizzitola Sports Center (512); Providence, RI
February 24, 2018; 5:00 pm, ILDN		at Yale	L 59–66	8–19 (2–10)	John J. Lee Amphitheater (612); New Haven, CT
March 2, 2018; 7:00 pm, SNY/ILDN		Dartmouth; Postponed to March 3 (inclement weather)			Levien Gymnasium; New York, NY
March 3, 2018; 2:00 pm, SNY/ILDN		Dartmouth; Rescheduled from March 2	L 77–88	8–20 (2–11)	Levien Gymnasium (555); New York, NY
March 3, 2018; 7:00 pm, SNY/ILDN		Harvard; Postponed to March 4 (inclement weather)			Levien Gymnasium; New York, NY
March 4, 2018; 2:00 pm, SNY/ILDN		Harvard; Rescheduled from March 3	L 59–78	8–21 (2–12)	Levien Gymnasium (349); New York, NY
*Non-conference game. ^{#}Rankings from AP Poll. (#) Tournament seedings in parentheses. All times are in Eastern Time.

== See also ==
- 2017–18 Columbia Lions men's basketball team
