= 2017–18 Cornell Big Red women's basketball team =

Intercollegiate basketball season

2017–18 Cornell Big Red women's basketball
- Conference: Ivy League
- Record: 7–20 (3–11 Ivy)
- Head coach: Dayna Smith (16th season)
- Assistant coaches: Val Klopfer; David Elliott; Shelby Lyman
- Home arena: Newman Arena

2017–18 Ivy League women's basketball standings
	Conf.				Overall
Team	W		L	PCT	W		L	PCT
Princeton †	12	–	2	.857	24	–	6	.800
Penn	11	–	3	.786	22	–	9	.710
Harvard	10	–	4	.714	18	–	11	.621
Yale	8	–	6	.571	19	–	13	.594
Dartmouth	7	–	7	.500	15	–	12	.556
Brown	3	–	11	.214	15	–	12	.556
Cornell	3	–	11	.214	7	–	20	.259
Columbia	2	–	12	.143	8	–	21	.276
† 2018 Ivy League Tournament winner Rankings from AP Poll

The 2017–18 Cornell Big Red women's basketball team represented Cornell University during the 2017–18 NCAA Division I women's basketball season. The Big Red, led by sixteenth year head coach Dayna Smith, played their home games at Newman Arena and were members of the Ivy League. They finished the season 7–20, 3–11 in Ivy League play to finish in a tie for sixth place. They failed to qualify for the Ivy women's tournament.

== Previous season ==
They finished the season 16–11, 7–7 in Ivy League play to finish in a tie for fourth place.

== Roster ==
2017–18 Cornell Big Red women's basketball team
Players
Coaches

Pos.	#	Name	Height	Year	Previous school	Hometown
G	3	Kate Sramac	5 ft 8 in (1.73 m)	Fr	Mount Lebanon	Pittsburgh, PA
G	4	Danielle Jorgenson	5 ft 9 in (1.75 m)	So	Orono	Orono, MN
G	5	Dylan Higgins	5 ft 11 in (1.8 m)	So	The Episcopal Academy	Bala Cynwyd, PA
G	10	Janée Dennis	6 ft 0 in (1.83 m)	Sr	St. Andrew's School	Burlington Township, NJ
G	12	Samantha Widmann	5 ft 11 in (1.8 m)	So	Notre Dame	Lawrenceville, NJ
G	13	Caroline Shelquist	5 ft 10 in (1.78 m)	Jr	Minnetonka	Minnetonka, MN
F	14	Elodie Furey	6 ft 2 in (1.88 m)	Fr	The Episcopal Academy	Villanova, PA
F	22	Halley Miklos	6 ft 1 in (1.85 m)	Fr	Liberty Common	Fort Collins, CO
G	23	Samantha Clement	5 ft 9 in (1.75 m)	Jr	Fairmont Preparatory Academy	Anaheim, CA
G/F	24	Ariana Abdulmassih	6 ft 2 in (1.88 m)	Fr	Saint Ignatius College Preparatory	San Francisco, CA
F	25	Jessica Willerson	6 ft 3 in (1.91 m)	So	Catherine McAuley	Falmouth, ME
F	30	Reena Olsen	6 ft 3 in (1.91 m)	So	Putnam Valley	Cortlandt Manor, NY
G	32	Laura Bagwell-Katalinich	6 ft 0 in (1.83 m)	So	Academy of the Holy Angels	Minneapolis, MN
F	33	Christine Ehland	6 ft 1 in (1.85 m)	Sr	Mount Lebanon	Pittsburgh, PA
F	45	Stephanie Umeh	6 ft 1 in (1.85 m)	So	Notre Dame Academy	Los Angeles, CA

Head coach

- Dayna Smith (Rhode Island)

Assistant coach(es)

- Val Klopfer (Wake Forest)
- David Elliott (Arizona)
- Shelby Lyman (Cornell)

Legend

- (C) Team captain
- (S) Suspended
- (I) Ineligible
- (W) Walk-on
- Injured
- Current redshirt

Roster
Last update: December 29, 2017

== Schedule ==
Date time, TV	Rank^{#}	Opponent^{#}	Result	Record	Site (attendance) city, state
Non-conference regular season
11/10/2017*; 12:00 pm		at Loyola (MD)	L 63–78	0–1	Reitz Arena (374); Baltimore, MD
11/13/2017*; 11:00 am, ACCN Extra		at Pittsburgh	L 39–51	0–2	Peterson Events Center (10,587); Pittsburgh, PA
11/16/2017*; 7:00 pm, ILDN		Colgate	L 70–74	0–3	Newman Arena (212); Ithaca, NY
11/20/2017*; 7:00 pm, ILDN		Lehigh	L 57–62	0–4	Newman Arena (124); Ithaca, NY
11/22/2017*; 1:00 pm		at Canisius	W 67–59	1–4	Koessler Athletic Center (618); Buffalo, NY
11/28/2017*; 7:00 pm, ILDN		Lafayette	L 58–59	1–5	Newman Arena (117); Ithaca, NY
12/01/2017*; 7:00 pm, ILDN		Stony Brook	W 48–40	2–5	Newman Arena (267); Ithaca, NY
12/16/2017*; 12:00 pm, ILDN		Oakland	L 77–79 ^{OT}	2–6	Newman Arena (112); Ithaca, NY
12/18/2017*; 7:00 pm, ILDN		Binghamton	L 58–66 ^{OT}	2–7	Newman Arena (229); Ithaca, NY
12/21/2017*; 1:00 pm		at Drexel	L 39–61	2–8	Daskalakis Athletic Center (524); Philadelphia, PA
12/29/2017*; 7:00 pm		at New Hampshire	L 45–48	2–9	Lundholm Gym (273); Durham, NH
12/31/2017*; 12:00 pm, ESPN3		at UMass Lowell	W 71–53	3–9	Costello Athletic Center (203); Lowell, MA
01/03/2018*; 11:00 am, ESPN3		at NJIT	W 61–46	4–9	Wellness and Events Center (1,457); Lowell, MA
Ivy League regular season
01/12/2018; 5:30 pm, ILDN		at Penn	L 48–68	4–10 (0–1)	Palestra (2,176); Philadelphia, PA
01/13/2018; 4:30 pm, ILDN		at Princeton	L 54–75	4–11 (0–2)	Jadwin Gymnasium (760); Princeton, NJ
01/20/2018; 4:00 pm, SNY		at Columbia	W 57–47	5–11 (1–2)	Levien Gymnasium (921); New York, NY
01/27/2018; 1:00 pm, ILDN		Columbia	L 54–72	5–12 (1–3)	Newman Arena; Ithaca, NY
02/02/2018; 7:00 pm, ILDN/ESPN3		at Dartmouth	L 40–55	5–11 (1–4)	Leede Arena (467); Hanover, NH
02/03/2018; 5:00 pm, ILDN/ESPN3		at Harvard	L 58–80	5–12 (1–5)	Lavietes Pavilion (620); Cambridge, MA
02/09/2018; 6:00 pm, ILDN/ESPN3		Brown	W 70–68	6–12 (2–5)	Newman Arena (343); Ithaca, NY
02/10/2018; 5:00 pm, ILDN/ESPN3		Yale	L 55–65	6–12 (2–6)	Newman Arena (379); Ithaca, NY
02/16/2018; 6:00 pm, ILDN		Princeton	L 40–72	6–16 (2–7)	Newman Arena (424); Ithaca, NY
02/17/2018; 4:00 pm, ILDN		at Penn	L 40–53	6–17 (2–8)	Newman Arena (523); Ithaca, NY
02/23/2018; 6:00 pm, ILDN		at Yale	L 56–69	6–18 (2–9)	John J. Lee Amphitheater (543); New Haven, CT
02/24/2018; 4:00 pm, ILDN		at Brown	L 59–85	7–18 (3–9)	Pizzitola Sports Center (350); Providence, RI
03/02/2018; 6:00 pm, ILDN		Harvard; Postponed to March 3 (inclement weather)			Newman Arena; Ithaca, NY
03/03/2018; 2:00 pm, ILDN		Harvard; Rescheduled from March 2	L 57–91	7–19 (3–10)	Newman Arena (214); Ithaca, NY
03/03/2018; 5:00 pm, ILDN/ESPN3		at Dartmouth; Postponed to March 4 (inclement weather)			Newman Arena; Ithaca, NY
03/04/2018; 2:00 pm, ILDN		at Dartmouth; Rescheduled from March 3	W 51–49	7–20 (3–11)	Newman Arena (178); Ithaca, NY
*Non-conference game. ^{#}Rankings from AP Poll. (#) Tournament seedings in parentheses. All times are in Eastern Time.

== See also ==
- 2017–18 Cornell Big Red men's basketball team
