= 2017–18 Harvard Crimson women's basketball team =

Intercollegiate basketball season

2017–18 Harvard Crimson women's basketball

WNIT, first round
- Conference: Ivy League
- Record: 18–11 (10–4 Ivy)
- Head coach: Kathy Delaney-Smith (36th season)
- Assistant coaches: Mike Roux; Megan Straumann; Jasmine Sborov
- Home arena: Lavietes Pavilion

2017–18 Ivy League women's basketball standings
	Conf.				Overall
Team	W		L	PCT	W		L	PCT
Princeton †	12	–	2	.857	24	–	6	.800
Penn	11	–	3	.786	22	–	9	.710
Harvard	10	–	4	.714	18	–	11	.621
Yale	8	–	6	.571	19	–	13	.594
Dartmouth	7	–	7	.500	15	–	12	.556
Brown	3	–	11	.214	15	–	12	.556
Cornell	3	–	11	.214	7	–	20	.259
Columbia	2	–	12	.143	8	–	21	.276
† 2018 Ivy League Tournament winner Rankings from AP Poll

The 2017–18 Harvard Crimson women's basketball team represented Harvard University during the 2017–18 NCAA Division I women's basketball season. The Crimson, led by 36th-year head coach Kathy Delaney-Smith, played their home games at the Lavietes Pavilion in Boston, Massachusetts and were members of the Ivy League. They finished the season 18–11, 10–4 in Ivy League, play to finish in third place. They lost in the semifinals of the Ivy women's tournament to Penn. They received an at-large bid to the WNIT where they lost to Fordham in the first round.

== Previous season ==
The Crimson finished the 2016–17 season 21–6, 8–6 in Ivy League play, to finish in third place. They lost in the semifinals of the Ivy women's tournament to Princeton. They were invited to the WNIT, where they defeated New Hampshire in the first round before losing to St. John's in the second round.

== Roster ==
2017–18 Harvard Crimson women's basketball team
Players
Coaches

Pos.	#	Name	Height	Year	Previous school	Hometown
G	0	Nani Redford	5 ft 5 in (1.65 m)	Jr	Long Island Lutheran	Manhasset, NY
G	1	Kelsey Bogdan	5 ft 11 in (1.8 m)	Jr	Montini Catholic	Clarendon Hills, IL
G	3	Katie Benzan	5 ft 6 in (1.68 m)	So	Noble and Greenough School	Wellesley, MA
G	5	Matilda Salen	5 ft 9 in (1.75 m)	Fr	Solna Gymnasium	Bromma, Sweden
G	11	Kirby Porter (C)	6 ft 1 in (1.85 m)	Sr	Bullis School	Chevy Chase, MD
G/F	12	Rachel Levy	6 ft 2 in (1.88 m)	Fr	Boca Raton Community	Boca Raton, FL
F	13	Jeannie Boehm	6 ft 3 in (1.91 m)	So	New Trier	Winnetka, IL
G	14	Mackenzie Barta	5 ft 9 in (1.75 m)	So	Maple Grove Senior	Maple Grove, MN
G	20	Madeline Raster (C)	5 ft 9 in (1.75 m)	Jr	Saint Joseph	South Bend, IN
F	21	Grace Tworek	6 ft 0 in (1.83 m)	Fr	William Fremd	Inverness, IL
F	22	Maddie Stuhlreyer	6 ft 5 in (1.96 m)	Fr	Ursuline Academy	Cincinnati, OH
F	24	Jadyn Bush	5 ft 11 in (1.8 m)	Fr	Bishop Blanchet	Federal Way, WA
G	25	Sydney Skinner	5 ft 7 in (1.7 m)	Jr	Plano West	Plano, TX
G	31	Taylor Rooks	6 ft 0 in (1.83 m)	Sr	Gill St. Bernard's School	Warren, NJ

Head coach

- Kathy Delaney-Smith (Bridgewater State)

Assistant coach(es)

- Mike Roux (Assumption (MA))
- Megan Straumann (Rhode Island)
- Jasmine Sborov (Colorado)

Legend

- (C) Team captain
- (S) Suspended
- (I) Ineligible
- (W) Walk-on
- Injured
- Current redshirt

Roster
Last update: March 28, 2025

== Schedule ==
Date time, TV	Rank^{#}	Opponent^{#}	Result	Record	Site (attendance) city, state
Regular season
November 10, 2017*; 8:00 p.m.		vs. Dayton; Maine Tip-Off Tournament semifinals	L 66–72	0–1	Memorial Gym (1,054); Orono, ME
November 11, 2017*; 4:00 p.m., ESPN3		at Maine; Maine Tip-Off Tournament 3rd-place game	L 51–76	0–2	Memorial Gym (855); Orono, ME
November 15, 2017*; 7:00 p.m., ILDN		Siena	W 75–67	1–2	Lavietes Pavilion (402); Boston, MA
November 18, 2017*; 2:00 p.m., NESN+/ILDN		Sacred Heart	W 70–62	2–2	Lavietes Pavilion (454); Boston, MA
November 21, 2017*; 6:00 p.m., NESN/ILDN		Boston University	W 80–70	3–2	Lavietes Pavilion (478); Boston, MA
November 25, 2017*; 2:00 p.m., ESPN3		at Virginia; Cavalier Classic Tournament	L 48–50	3–3	John Paul Jones Arena (2,838); Charlottesville, VA
November 26, 2017*; 1:00 p.m.		vs. North Carolina A&T; Cavalier Classic Tournament	W 64–60	4–3	John Paul Jones Arena (107); Charlottesville, VA
December 2, 2017*; 2:00 p.m.		at Temple	L 64–86	4–4	McGonigle Hall (1,084); Philadelphia, PA
December 6, 2017*; 12:00 p.m.		at Northeastern	W 69–59	5–4	Matthews Arena (2,043); Boston, MA
December 20, 2017*; 12:00 p.m., ESPN3		at Florida Gulf Coast; FGCU Hilton Inn Garden Classic	L 56–65	5–5	Alico Arena (2,297); Fort Myers, FL
December 21, 2017*; 4:30 p.m.		vs. Akron; FGCU Hilton Inn Garden Classic	W 76–63	6–5	Alico Arena; Fort Myers, FL
December 31, 2017*; 2:00 p.m., NESN/ILDN		Stony Brook	W 60–53	7–5	Lavietes Pavilion (508); Boston, MA
January 6, 2018; 5:00 p.m., ILDN		at Dartmouth	L 56–63	7–6 (0–1)	Leede Arena (779); Durham, NH
January 10, 2018*; 12:00 p.m., NESN/ILDN		La Salle	W 70–61	8–6	Lavietes Pavilion (504); Boston, MA
January 20, 2018; 6:00 p.m., ESPN3/ILDN		Dartmouth	W 76–65	9–6 (1–1)	Lavietes Pavilion (872); Boston, MA
January 26, 2018; 6:00 p.m., ILDN		Yale	W 97–73	10–6 (1–1)	Lavietes Pavilion (561); Boston, MA
January 27, 2018; 4:00 p.m., NESN/ILDN		Brown	W 87–85	11–6 (2–1)	Lavietes Pavilion (1,016); Boston, MA
February 2, 2018; 6:00 p.m., NESN+/ILDN		Columbia	W 85–67	12–6 (3–1)	Lavietes Pavilion (1,102); Boston, MA
February 3, 2018; 5:00 p.m., ESPN3/ILDN		Cornell	W 80–58	13–6 (4–1)	Lavietes Pavilion (620); Boston, MA
February 9, 2018; 6:30 p.m., ESPN3/ILDN		at Princeton	L 47–80	13–7 (4–2)	Jadwin Gymnasium (986); Princeton, NJ
February 10, 2018; 7:00 p.m., ESPN3/ILDN		at Penn	L 49–69	13–8 (4–3)	Palestra (606); Philadelphia, PA
February 16, 2018; 6:00 p.m., ESPN3/ILDN		at Brown	W 86–74	14–8 (5–3)	Pizzitola Sports Center (352); Providence, RI
February 17, 2018; 6:00 p.m., NESN/ILDN		at Yale	L 63–69	14–9 (5–4)	John J. Lee Amphitheater (1,006); Durham, NH
February 23, 2018; 6:00 p.m., NESN+/ILDN		Penn	W 55–52	15–9 (6–4)	Lavietes Pavilion (703); Boston, MA
February 24, 2018; 7:00 p.m., NESN+/ILDN		Princeton	W 72–58	16–9 (8–4)	Lavietes Pavilion (1,085); Boston, MA
March 3, 2018; 2:00 p.m., ILDN		at Cornell	W 91–57	17–9 (9–4)	Newman Arena (214); Ithaca, NY
March 4, 2018; 2:00 p.m., ILDN		at Columbia	W 78–59	18–9 (10–4)	Levien Gymnasium (349); New York, NY
Ivy League tournament
March 10, 2018; 8:30 p.m., ESPN3	(3)	vs. (2) Penn; Semifinals	L 52–57	18–10	Palestra; Philadelphia, PA
WNIT
March 16, 2018*; 7:00 p.m.		at Fordham; First round	L 47–65	18–11	Rose Hill Gymnasium (558); The Bronx, NY
*Non-conference game. ^{#}Rankings from AP poll. (#) Tournament seedings in parentheses. All times are in Eastern.

== Rankings ==
Regular-season polls
Poll	Pre- season	Week 2	Week 3	Week 4	Week 5	Week 6	Week 7	Week 8	Week 9	Week 10	Week 11	Week 12	Week 13	Week 14	Week 15	Week 16	Week 17	Week 18	Week 19	Final
AP																				N/A
Coaches																				

Legend
	Increase in ranking
	Decrease in ranking
	No change
(RV)	Received votes
(NR)	Not ranked

== See also ==
- 2017–18 Harvard Crimson men's basketball team
