= 2017–18 Penn Quakers women's basketball team =

Intercollegiate basketball season

2017–18 Penn Quakers women's basketball

NJIT Highlanders Christmas Tournament Champions

WNIT, Second Round
- Conference: Ivy League
- Record: 22–9 (11–3 Ivy)
- Head coach: Mike McLaughlin (9th season)
- Assistant coaches: Bernadette Laukaitis; Kelly Killion; Ashley Robinson
- Home arena: Palestra

2017–18 Ivy League women's basketball standings
	Conf.				Overall
Team	W		L	PCT	W		L	PCT
Princeton †	12	–	2	.857	24	–	6	.800
Penn	11	–	3	.786	22	–	9	.710
Harvard	10	–	4	.714	18	–	11	.621
Yale	8	–	6	.571	19	–	13	.594
Dartmouth	7	–	7	.500	15	–	12	.556
Brown	3	–	11	.214	15	–	12	.556
Cornell	3	–	11	.214	7	–	20	.259
Columbia	2	–	12	.143	8	–	21	.276
† 2018 Ivy League Tournament winner Rankings from AP Poll

The 2017–18 Penn Quakers women's basketball team represented the University of Pennsylvania during the 2017–18 NCAA Division I women's basketball season. The Quakers, led by ninth year head coach Mike McLaughlin, play their home games at the Palestra and were members of the Ivy League. They finished the season 22–9, 11–3 to finish in second place. They advanced to the championship game of the Ivy League women's tournament, where they lost to Princeton. They received an automatic trip to the Women's National Invitation Tournament, where they defeated Albany in the first before losing to St. John's in the second round.

== Previous season ==
The team was picked by the Ivy League in the pre-season to be conference champions. finished the season 22–8, 13–1 to win the Ivy League regular season title and their first ever Ivy League Tournament to earn an automatic trip to the NCAA women's tournament, where they had a 21 point lead before losing to Texas A&M in the first round.

== Roster ==
2017–18 Penn Quakers women's basketball team
Players
Coaches

Pos.	#	Name	Height	Year	Previous school	Hometown
G	2	Katie Kinum	5 ft 9 in (1.75 m)	Fr	New Providence	New Providence, NJ
G	3	Michae Jones	5 ft 8 in (1.73 m)	Fr	E.D. White Catholic	Thibodaux, LA
G	10	Anna Ross (C)	5 ft 9 in (1.75 m)	Sr	Westhill	Syracuse, NY
G	11	Kendall Grasela	5 ft 10 in (1.78 m)	So	Germantown Academy	Huntingdon Valley, PA
G	14	Beth Brzozowski (C)	5 ft 8 in (1.73 m)	Sr	Hathaway Brown	Highland Heights, OH
F	15	Liz Satter	6 ft 2 in (1.88 m)	So	Loyola Academy	Glencoe, IL
G	21	Lauren Whitlatch (C)	5 ft 11 in (1.8 m)	Sr	Bloomington	Bloomington, IN
G	22	Deja Jackson	5 ft 8 in (1.73 m)	Jr	Grinnell	Grinnell, IA
G	23	Kristen Daley	6 ft 1 in (1.85 m)	Jr	The Rivers School	Sharon, MA
F	24	Tori Crawford	6 ft 2 in (1.88 m)	Fr	Bullis School	Potomac, MD
G	25	Ashley Russell	5 ft 10 in (1.78 m)	Jr	Braintree	Braintree, MA
C	31	Eleah Parker	6 ft 4 in (1.93 m)	Fr	Northside Christian Academy	Charlotte, NC
G	33	Phoebe Sterba	6 ft 1 in (1.85 m)	So	Magnificat	Cleveland, OH
F	34	Chrissy Dicindio	6 ft 2 in (1.88 m)	Fr	West Windsor-Plainsboro	West Windsor, NJ
C	40	Emily Anderson	6 ft 4 in (1.93 m)	So	South Fayette	Bridgeville, PA
F	43	Michelle Nwokedi (C)	6 ft 3 in (1.91 m)	Sr	St. Agnes Academy	Missouri City, TX
F	50	Princess Aghayere	6 ft 0 in (1.83 m)	Jr	South Lakes	Reston, VA

Head coach

- Mike McLaughlin (Holy Family)

Assistant coach(es)

- Bernadette Laukaitis (Holy Family)
- Kelly Killion (Holy Family)
- Ashley Robinson (Saint Joseph's)

Legend

- (C) Team captain
- (S) Suspended
- (I) Ineligible
- (W) Walk-on
- Injured
- Current redshirt

Roster
Last update: December 29, 2017

== Schedule ==
Date time, TV	Rank^{#}	Opponent^{#}	Result	Record	Site (attendance) city, state
Regular season
11/15/2017*; 7:00 pm, ESPN3		at Binghamton	L 72–77	0–1	Binghamton University Events Center (1,364); Vestal, NY
11/18/2017*; 5:00 pm, ILDN		Lafayette	W 55–42	1–1	Palestra (705); Philadelphia, PA
11/23/2017*; 5:15 pm		vs. Georgia Tech; Junkanoo Jam Junkanoo Division semifinals	L 55–69	1–2	Gateway Christian Academy; Bimini, BAH
11/24/2017*; 7:45 pm		vs. Missouri State; Junkanoo Jam Junkanoo Division 3rd place game	W 65–60	2–2	Gateway Christian Academy; Bimini, BAH
11/29/2017*; 7:00 pm		at La Salle	L 59–66	2–3	Tom Gola Arena (573); Philadelphia, PA
12/09/2017*; 1:00 pm, NBCSPHI/ILDN		No. 3 Notre Dame	L 54–66	2–4	Palestra (1,647); Philadelphia, PA
12/11/2017*; 7:00 pm		at Saint Joseph's	W 57–50	3–4	Hagan Arena (913); Philadelphia, PA
12/22/2017*; 1:00 pm		Rhode Island	W 84–66	4–4	Palestra (456); Philadelphia, PA
12/28/2017*; 7:00 pm		vs. VCU; NJIT Highlanders Christmas Tournament semifinals	W 82–52	5–4	Wellness and Events Center (371); Newark, NJ
12/29/2017*; 5:00 pm, ESPN3		at NJIT; NJIT Highlanders Christmas Tournament championship	W 77–38	6–4	Wellness and Events Center (400); Newark, NJ
01/06/2018; 1:00 pm, NBCSPHI+/ILDN		Princeton	L 55–70	6–5 (0–1)	Palestra (1,003); Philadelphia, PA
01/12/2018; 5:30 pm, ILDN		Cornell	W 68–48	7–5 (1–1)	Palestra (2,176); Philadelphia, PA
01/13/2018; 4:30 pm, ILDN		Columbia	W 70–51	8–5 (2–1)	Palestra (2,084); Philadelphia, PA
01/17/2018*; 7:00 pm		at Villanova	W 79–77	9–5	Jake Nevin Field House (519); Villanova, PA
01/24/2018*; 7:00 pm		at Temple	W 74–59	10–5	McGonigle Hall (936); Philadelphia, PA
01/28/2018*; 1:00 pm		Gwynedd Mercy	W 89–25	11–5	Palestra (558); Philadelphia, PA
02/02/2018; 6:00 pm, ILDN/ESPN3		at Brown	W 88–55	12–5 (3–1)	Pizzitola Sports Center (311); Providence, RI
02/03/2018; 5:00 pm, ILDN/ESPN3		at Yale	W 69–54	13–5 (4–1)	John J. Lee Amphitheater (654); New Haven, CT
02/09/2018; 7:00 pm, ILDN		Dartmouth	W 65–47	14–5 (5–1)	Palestra (637); Philadelphia, PA
02/10/2018; 7:00 pm, ILDN/ESPN3		Harvard	W 69–49	15–5 (6–1)	Palestra (606); Philadelphia, PA
02/13/2018; 6:30 pm, NBCSPHI+/ILDN		at Princeton	L 40–60	15–6 (6–2)	Jadwin Gymnasium (672); Princeton, NJ
02/16/2018; 4:00 pm, NBCSPHI/ILDN		at Columbia	W 75–39	16–6 (7–2)	Levien Gymnasium (472); New York, NY
02/17/2018; 4:00 pm, ILDN		at Cornell	W 53–39	17–6 (8–2)	Newman Arena (523); Ithaca, NY
02/23/2018; 6:00 pm, ILDN/NESN+		at Harvard	L 52–55	17–7 (8–3)	Lavietes Pavilion (703); Cambridge, MA
02/24/2018; 5:00 pm, ILDN		at Dartmouth	W 79–50	18–7 (9–3)	Leede Arena (817); Durham, NH
03/02/2018; 7:00 pm, ILDN/ESPN3		Yale	W 64–52	19–7 (10–3)	Palestra (313); Philadelphia, PA
03/03/2018; 6:00 pm, ILDN		Brown	W 67–56	20–7 (11–3)	Palestra (638); Philadelphia, PA
Ivy League Women's Tournament
03/10/2018; 8:30 pm, ESPN3	(2)	vs. (3) Harvard; Semifinals	W 57–52	21–7	Palestra; Philadelphia, PA
03/11/2018; 4:00 pm, ESPNU	(2)	vs. (1) Princeton; Championship Game	L 34–63	21–8	Palestra; Philadelphia, PA
WNIT
03/16/2018*; 7:00 pm, ILDN		Albany; First Round	W 76–61	22–8	Palestra (609); Philadelphia, PA
03/19/2018*; 7:00 pm, ESPN3		at St. John's; Second Round	L 48–53	22–9	Carnesecca Arena (478); Queens, NY
*Non-conference game. ^{#}Rankings from AP Poll. (#) Tournament seedings in parentheses. All times are in Eastern Time.

== See also ==
- 2017–18 Penn Quakers men's basketball team
