= 2017–18 Brown Bears women's basketball team =

Intercollegiate basketball season

2017–18 Brown Bears women's basketball

Ocean State Tip-Off Champions
- Conference: Ivy League
- Record: 15–12 (3–11 Ivy)
- Head coach: Sarah Behn (4th season)
- Assistant coaches: Tyler Patch; Sara Binkhorst; Jeffrey Kirpas
- Home arena: Pizzitola Sports Center

2017–18 Ivy League women's basketball standings
	Conf.				Overall
Team	W		L	PCT	W		L	PCT
Princeton †	12	–	2	.857	24	–	6	.800
Penn	11	–	3	.786	22	–	9	.710
Harvard	10	–	4	.714	18	–	11	.621
Yale	8	–	6	.571	19	–	13	.594
Dartmouth	7	–	7	.500	15	–	12	.556
Brown	3	–	11	.214	15	–	12	.556
Cornell	3	–	11	.214	7	–	20	.259
Columbia	2	–	12	.143	8	–	21	.276
† 2018 Ivy League Tournament winner Rankings from AP Poll

The 2017–18 Brown Bears women's basketball team represented Brown University during the 2017–18 NCAA Division I women's basketball season. The Bears, led by fourth year head coach Sarah Behn, played their home games at the Pizzitola Sports Center and were members of the Ivy League. They finished the season 15–12, 3–11 in Ivy League play to finish in a tie for sixth place. They failed to qualify for the Ivy women's tournament.

== Previous season ==
They finished the season 17–13, 7–7 in Ivy League play to finish in a tie for fourth place. They lost in the semifinals of the Ivy women's tournament to Penn. They were invited to the Women's Basketball Invitational, where they defeated UMBC in the first round before losing in the quarterfinals to UNC Greensboro.

== Roster ==
2017–18 Brown Bears women's basketball team
Players
Coaches

Pos.	#	Name	Height	Year	Previous school	Hometown
G	1	Megan Reilly	5 ft 7 in (1.7 m)	Sr	The Lawrenceville School	Norwood, NJ
G	3	Dominique Leonidas	5 ft 5 in (1.65 m)	Fr	Parkview	Stone Mountain, GA
G/F	4	Justine Gaziano	6 ft 0 in (1.83 m)	So	Natick	Natick, MA
F	5	Morgan Clausen	6 ft 0 in (1.83 m)	Fr	Huntley	Algonquin, IL
G	10	Taylor Will	5 ft 11 in (1.8 m)	Jr	Prespect	Arlington Heights, IL
G/F	11	Savannah Lewis	6 ft 0 in (1.83 m)	Fr	Sierra Canyon	Westlake Village, CA
G	12	McKenna Dale	6 ft 0 in (1.83 m)	Fr	Edwin O. Smith	Storrs, CT
G	22	Randi Richardson	5 ft 5 in (1.65 m)	So	Carman-Ainsworth	Flint, MI
F	23	Melissa Heath	6 ft 2 in (1.88 m)	Jr	Northern Highlands Regional	Ho-Ho-Kus, NJ
F	24	Mary Butler	6 ft 2 in (1.88 m)	Jr	Bangor	Bangor, ME
G/F	25	Kathleen Ryan	6 ft 2 in (1.88 m)	So	Buffalo Academy of the Sacred Heart	Clarence Center, ME
G	30	Shayna Mehta	5 ft 7 in (1.7 m)	Jr	International	San Francisco, CA
F	31	Erika Steeves	6 ft 2 in (1.88 m)	Jr	Phillips Exeter Academy	Montreal, QE
F	32	Janie White	6 ft 2 in (1.88 m)	Sr	Rossview	Clarksville, TN
C	34	Jenna Benzinger	6 ft 5 in (1.96 m)	Fr	Mt. Greylock Regional	Williamstown, MA
F/C	40	Lames ElGammal	6 ft 2 in (1.88 m)	So	Baldwin	Baldwin, NY
F/C	42	Haley Green	6 ft 3 in (1.91 m)	So	Glenvar	Salem, VA

Head coach

- Sarah Behn (Boston College)

Assistant coach(es)

- Tyler Patch (Rhode Island College)
- Sara Binkhorst (Bowdoin)
- Jeffrey Kirpas (Holy Cross)

Legend

- (C) Team captain
- (S) Suspended
- (I) Ineligible
- (W) Walk-on
- Injured
- Current redshirt

Roster
Last update: December 29, 2017

== Schedule ==
Date time, TV	Rank^{#}	Opponent^{#}	Result	Record	Site (attendance) city, state
Non-conference regular season
11/12/2017*; 1:00 pm, ILDN		Bryant; Ocean State Cup	W 85–62	1–0	Pizzitola Sports Center (239); Providence, RI
11/12/2017*; 7:00 pm		at Central Connecticut	W 78–55	2–0	William H. Detrick Gymnasium (798); New Britain, CT
11/19/2017*; 12:00 pm, ILDN		No. 20 California	L 79–89	2–1	Pizzitola Sports Center (361); Providence, RI
11/24/2017*; 4:00 pm		vs. Hampton; Turkey Tip-Off	W 73–66	3–1	Alex G. Spanos Center (431); Stockton, CA
11/25/2017*; 8:00 pm		at Pacific; Turkey Tip-Off	W 74–57	4–1	Alex G. Spanos Center (440); Stockton, CA
11/29/2017*; 7:00 pm, ILDN		Holy Cross	W 82–78	5–1	Pizzitola Sports Center (237); Providence, RI
12/02/2017*; 12:00 pm, YurView		at Providence; Ocean State Tip-Off semifinals	W 64–59	6–1	Alumni Hall; Providence, RI
12/03/2017*; 2:30 pm, YurView		vs. Bryant; Ocean State Tip-Off championship	W 72–60	7–1	Alumni Hall (548); Providence, RI
12/06/2017*; 7:00 pm, ILDN		Sacred Heart	W 102–77	8–1	Pizzitola Sports Center (116); Providence, RI
12/10/2017*; 12:00 pm		at Colgate	W 83–73	9–1	Cotterell Court (487); Hamilton, NY
12/22/2017*; 1:00 pm, NESN+/ILDN		Boston University	W 92–68	10–1	Pizzitola Sports Center (751); Providence, RI
12/31/2017*; 2:00 pm		at Howard	W 85–81 ^{OT}	11–1	Burr Gymnasium (127); Washington, D.C.
01/05/2018*; 12:00 pm		Johnson & Wales (RI)	W 100–79	12–1	Pizzitola Sports Center (237); Providence, RI
Ivy League regular season
01/12/2018; 12:00 pm, ELVN/ILDN		at Yale	L 63–77	12–2 (0–1)	John J. Lee Amphitheater (605); New Haven, CT
01/19/2018; 5:30 pm, MyRITV/ILDN		Yale	W 81–71 ^{OT}	13–2 (1–1)	Pizzitola Sports Center (1,553); Providence, RI
01/26/2018; 7:00 pm, ESPN3/ILDN		at Dartmouth	L 73–78	13–3 (1–2)	Leede Arena (570); New Haven, CT
01/27/2018; 4:00 pm, NESN/ILDN		at Harvard	L 85–87	13–4 (1–3)	Lavietes Pavilion (1,016); Cambridge, MA
02/02/2018; 6:00 pm, ESPN3/ILDN		Penn	L 55–88	13–5 (1–4)	Pizzitola Sports Center (311); Providence, RI
02/03/2018; 4:00 pm, ILDN		Princeton	L 62–77	13–6 (1–5)	Pizzitola Sports Center (402); Providence, RI
02/09/2018; 6:00 pm, ESPN3/ILDN		at Cornell	L 68–70	13–7 (1–6)	Newman Arena (343); Ithaca, NY
02/10/2018; 5:00 pm, ILDN		at Columbia	W 84–80	14–7 (2–6)	Levien Gymnasium (512); New York, NY
02/16/2018; 6:00 pm, ESPN3/ILDN		Harvard	L 74–86	13–8 (2–7)	Pizzitola Sports Center (352); Providence, RI
02/17/2018; 4:00 pm, ILDN		Dartmouth	L 60–77	14–9 (2–8)	Pizzitola Sports Center (272); Providence, RI
02/23/2018; 6:00 pm, ESPN3/ILDN		Columbia	L 74–90	14–10 (2–9)	Pizzitola Sports Center (214); Providence, RI
02/24/2018; 4:00 pm, MyRITV/ILDN		Cornell	W 85–59	15–10 (3–9)	Pizzitola Sports Center (350); Providence, RI
03/02/2018; 6:30 pm, ESPN3/ILDN		at Princeton	L 44–79	15–11 (3–10)	Jadwin Gymnasium (743); Princeton, NJ
03/03/2018; 6:00 pm, ILDN		at Penn	L 56–67	15–12 (3–11)	Palestra (638); Philadelphia, PA
*Non-conference game. ^{#}Rankings from AP Poll. (#) Tournament seedings in parentheses. All times are in Eastern Time.

== See also ==
- 2017–18 Brown Bears men's basketball team
