= 2017–18 Yale Bulldogs women's basketball team =

Intercollegiate basketball season

2017–18 Yale Bulldogs women's basketball

WBI champions
- Conference: Ivy League
- Record: 19–13 (8–6 Ivy)
- Head coach: Allison Guth (3rd season)
- Assistant coaches: Melissa D'Amico; Roman Owen; Jacinda Dunbar
- Home arena: John J. Lee Amphitheater

2017–18 Ivy League women's basketball standings
	Conf.				Overall
Team	W		L	PCT	W		L	PCT
Princeton †	12	–	2	.857	24	–	6	.800
Penn	11	–	3	.786	22	–	9	.710
Harvard	10	–	4	.714	18	–	11	.621
Yale	8	–	6	.571	19	–	13	.594
Dartmouth	7	–	7	.500	15	–	12	.556
Brown	3	–	11	.214	15	–	12	.556
Cornell	3	–	11	.214	7	–	20	.259
Columbia	2	–	12	.143	8	–	21	.276
† 2018 Ivy League Tournament winner Rankings from AP Poll

The 2017–18 Yale Bulldogs women's basketball team represented Yale University during the 2017–18 NCAA Division I women's basketball season. The Bulldogs, led by third-year head coach Allison Guth, played their home games at John J. Lee Amphitheater of the Payne Whitney Gymnasium in New Haven, Connecticut as members of the Ivy League.

They finished the season at 19–13, 8–6 for fourth place in the Ivy League, which afforded them a spot in the conference playoff for a bid in the NCAA tournament. However, they were defeated in the first round by Princeton. The Bulldogs were then invited to the WBI, and they went on to win the championship, the first Ivy League team to win a postseason tournament.

== Previous season ==
The Bulldogs finished the 2016–17 season 15–12, 6–8 in Ivy League play, to finish in sixth place.

== Roster ==
2017–18 Yale Bulldogs women's basketball team
Players
Coaches

Pos.	#	Name	Height	Year	Previous school	Hometown
G	1	Jessica Steffen	5 ft 9 in (1.75 m)	So	Buhler	Hutchinson, KS
G	4	Megan Gorman	6 ft 1 in (1.85 m)	So	Vero Beach	Vero Beach, FL
G/F	10	Gabby Nelson	6 ft 0 in (1.83 m)	Jr	Birdville	Hurst, TX
G	11	Ale Aguirre	5 ft 8 in (1.73 m)	Fr	The Bishop's School	La Jolla, CA
F	12	Jen Berkowitz	6 ft 2 in (1.88 m)	Sr	The Rivers School	Wayland, MA
G	14	Mary Ann Santucci	5 ft 9 in (1.75 m)	Sr	Seattle Prep	Seattle, WA
F	15	Alex Cade	6 ft 1 in (1.85 m)	Fr	Laurel School	Shaker Heights, OH
G	21	Roxy Barahman	5 ft 8 in (1.73 m)	So	Oaks Christian	Calabasas, CA
G/F	22	Aerial Chavarin	5 ft 10 in (1.78 m)	So	Bishop O'Dowd	Oakland, CA
G	23	Tamara Simpson	5 ft 10 in (1.78 m)	Sr	Portlege	North Babylon, NY
F	24	Ellen Margaret Andrews	5 ft 10 in (1.78 m)	Fr	Greenhill School	Dallas, TX
F	25	Alexandra Maund	5 ft 11 in (1.8 m)	Jr	Noble and Greenough	Dorchester, MA
G	33	Tori Andrew	5 ft 10 in (1.78 m)	Fr	Orono Senior	Wayzata, MN
F	40	Brownyn Davies	5 ft 11 in (1.8 m)	So	Wayland	Wayland, MA
C	44	Jessica Lezon	6 ft 6 in (1.98 m)	So	North Reading	North Reading, MA

Head coach

- Allison Guth (Illinois)

Assistant coach(es)

- Melissa D'Amico (Notre Dame)
- Roman Owen (Southwestern Christian)
- Jacinda Dunbar (Quinnipiac)

Legend

- (C) Team captain
- (S) Suspended
- (I) Ineligible
- (W) Walk-on
- Injured
- Current redshirt

Roster
Last update: October 8, 2024

== Schedule ==
Date time, TV	Rank^{#}	Opponent^{#}	Result	Record	Site (attendance) city, state
Non-conference regular season
November 10, 2017*; 7:00 p.m., ILDN		LIU Brooklyn	W 62–51	1–0	John J. Lee Amphitheater (802); New Haven, CT
November 13, 2017*; 7:00 p.m., ILDN		Colgate	W 82–56	2–0	John J. Lee Amphitheater (846); New Haven, CT
November 19, 2017*; 8:00 p.m., ESPN3		at Kansas	L 75–81	2–1	Allen Fieldhouse (1,918); Lawrence, KS
November 21, 2017*; 7:30 p.m.		at TCU	W 82–72	3–1	Schollmaier Arena (1,796); Fort Worth, TX
November 26, 2017*; 2:00 p.m.		Army	L 65–82	3–2	John J. Lee Amphitheater (502); New Haven, CT
November 29, 2017*; 6:00 p.m., ILDN/ESPN3		Providence	L 51–55	3–3	John J. Lee Amphitheater; New Haven, CT
December 2, 2017*; 12:00 p.m., ESPN3		at Binghamton	W 73–69 ^{OT}	4–3	Binghamton University Events Center (3,640); Vestal, NY
December 6, 2017*; 7:00 p.m., ESPN3		at Stony Brook	W 77–71 ^{2OT}	5–3	Island Federal Credit Union Arena; Stony Brook, NY
December 9, 2017*; 1:00 p.m.		at Central Connecticut	W 75–62	6–3	William H. Detrick Gymnasium (412); New Britain, CT
December 12, 2017*; 7:00 p.m.		at Saint Peter's	W 70–49	7–3	Yanitelli Center (150); Jersey City, NJ
December 21, 2017*; 1:00 p.m.		Indiana	L 68–72	7–4	John J. Lee Amphitheater (311); New Haven, CT
December 28, 2017*; 3:30 p.m.		vs. UC Davis; Fordham Holiday Classic semifinals	L 61–71	7–5	Rose Hill Gymnasium (832); The Bronx, NY
December 29, 2017*; 1:00 p.m.		vs. Hartford; Fordham Holiday Classic 3rd-place game	L 70–78	7–6	Rose Hill Gymnasium (862); Bronx, NY
Ivy League regular season
January 12, 2018; 12:00 p.m., ILDN/ELVN		Brown	W 77–63	8–6 (1–0)	John J. Lee Amphitheater (605); New Haven, CT
January 19, 2018; 5:30 p.m., ILDN/MyRITV		at Brown	L 71–81 ^{OT}	8–7 (1–1)	Pizzitola Sports Center (1,553); Providence, RI
January 26, 2018; 6:00 p.m., ILDN		at Harvard	L 73–97	8–8 (1–2)	Lavietes Pavilion (561); Cambridge, MA
January 27, 2018; 5:00 p.m., ILDN		at Dartmouth	W 57–39	9–8 (2–2)	Leede Arena (1,098); Hanover, NH
February 2, 2018; 6:00 p.m., ILDN		Princeton	W 73–59	10–8 (3–2)	John J. Lee Amphitheater (688); New Haven, CT
February 3, 2018; 5:00 p.m., ILDN/ESPN3		Penn	L 54–69	10–9 (3–3)	John J. Lee Amphitheater (654); New Haven, CT
February 9, 2018; 7:00 p.m., ILDN/SNY		at Columbia	W 73–50	11–9 (4–3)	Levien Gymnasium (412); New York, NY
February 10, 2018; 5:00 p.m., ILDN/ESPN3		at Cornell	W 65–55	12–9 (5–3)	Newman Arena (379); Ithaca, NY
February 16, 2018; 6:00 p.m., ILDN		Dartmouth	L 62–64 ^{OT}	12–10 (5–4)	John J. Lee Amphitheater (291); New Haven, CT
February 17, 2018; 6:00 p.m., ILDN/ESPN3		Harvard	W 69–63	13–10 (6–4)	John J. Lee Amphitheater (1,006); New Haven, CT
February 23, 2018; 6:00 p.m., ILDN		Cornell	W 69–56	14–10 (7–4)	John J. Lee Amphitheater (543); New Haven, CT
February 24, 2018; 5:00 p.m., ILDN		Columbia	W 66–59	15–10 (8–4)	John J. Lee Amphitheater (612); New Haven, CT
March 2, 2018; 7:00 p.m., ILDN/ESPN3		Penn	L 52–64	15–11 (8–5)	Palestra (313); Philadelphia, PA
March 3, 2018; 5:00 p.m., ILDN		at Princeton	L 53–64	15–12 (8–6)	Jadwin Gymnasium (1,272); Princeton, NJ
Ivy League women's tournament
March 10, 2018; 6:00 p.m., ESPN3	(4)	vs. (1) Princeton; Semifinals	L 57–78	15–13	Palestra; Philadelphia, PA
WBI
March 15, 2018*; 7:00 p.m.		at Northeastern; First round	W 68–58	16–13	Cabot Center (232); Boston, MA
March 20, 2018*; 7:00 p.m., ESPN3		at Binghamton; Quarterfinals	W 70–64	17–13	Binghamton University Events Center (703); Vestal, NY
March 24, 2018*; 5:00 p.m.		South Alabama; Semifinals	W 76–74 ^{OT}	18–13	John J. Lee Amphitheater (350); New Haven, CT
March 29, 2018*; 8:00 p.m.		at Central Arkansas; Championship game	W 54–50	19–13	Farris Center (3,526); Conway, AR
*Non-conference game. ^{#}Rankings from AP poll. (#) Tournament seedings in parentheses. All times are in Eastern.

== See also ==
- 2017–18 Yale Bulldogs men's basketball team
