= 2019–20 Columbia Lions women's basketball team =

Intercollegiate basketball season

2019–20 Columbia Lions women's basketball
- Conference: Ivy League
- Record: 17–10 (8–6 Ivy)
- Head coach: Megan Griffith (4th season)
- Assistant coaches: Tyler Cordell; Greg Rosnick; Anjalé Barrett
- Home arena: Levien Gymnasium

2019–20 Ivy League women's basketball standings
	Conf.				Overall
Team	W		L	PCT	W		L	PCT
No. 22 Princeton	14	–	0	1.000	26	–	1	.963
Penn	10	–	4	.714	20	–	7	.741
Yale	9	–	5	.643	18	–	8	.692
Columbia	8	–	6	.571	17	–	10	.630
Harvard	6	–	8	.429	15	–	12	.556
Dartmouth	4	–	10	.286	10	–	17	.370
Cornell	3	–	11	.214	10	–	16	.385
Brown	2	–	12	.143	8	–	19	.296
† 2020 Ivy League Tournament; Ivy League Tournament canceled due to COVID-19 pandemic winner Rankings from AP Poll

The 2019–20 Columbia Lions women's basketball team represented Columbia University during the 2019–20 NCAA Division I women's basketball season. The Lions, led by fourth-year head coach Megan Griffith, played their home games at Levien Gymnasium and were members of the Ivy League. They finished the season 17–10, 8–6 in Ivy League play to finish in fourth place. The Lions qualified for Ivy Madness for the first time in the program's 34-year history, but the 2020 tournament was cancelled due to COVID-19.

== Previous season ==
They finished the season 8–19, 4–10 in Ivy League play to finish in seventh place. They failed to qualify for the Ivy women's tournament.

== Roster ==
2019–20 Columbia Lions women's basketball team
Players
Coaches

Pos.	#	Name	Height	Year	Previous school	Hometown
G	1	Janiya Clemmons	5 ft 9 in (1.75 m)	Sr	Bishop Denis J. O'Connell	Accokeek, MD
G	2	Madison Hardy	5 ft 9 in (1.75 m)	So	Our Lady of Good Counsel	Gaithersburg, MD
G/F	4	Kaitlyn Davis	6 ft 0 in (1.83 m)	Fr	Greenwich Academy	Norwalk, CT
G	5	Riley Casey	5 ft 8 in (1.73 m)	Jr	Franklin Road Academy	Brentwood, TN
G	10	Andrea McCormick	5 ft 8 in (1.73 m)	Jr	Villa Maria Academy	Erie, PA
F	12	Hannah Pratt	6 ft 1 in (1.85 m)	So	Boca Raton	Boca Raton, FL
G	13	Mikayla Markham	5 ft 7 in (1.7 m)	So	St. Rose	Manasquan, NJ
G	15	Carly Rivera	5 ft 4 in (1.63 m)	Fr	St. John's College High School	Arlington, VA
G/F	20	Sienna Durr	6 ft 0 in (1.83 m)	So	Grinnell	Grinnell, IA
G/F	23	Lilian Kennedy	5 ft 11 in (1.8 m)	So	Mountain View	Burford, GA
F	24	Kallin Spiller	6 ft 3 in (1.91 m)	Jr	Lakeside; Seattle	Seattle, WA
F/C	32	Madison Pack	6 ft 3 in (1.91 m)	Jr	Sarasota	Sarasota, FL
G	35	Abbey Hsu	5 ft 11 in (1.8 m)	Fr	Marjory Stoneman Douglas; St. Thomas Aquinas High School	Parkland, FL

Head coach

- Megan Griffith (Columbia)

Assistant coach(es)

- Tyler Cordell (Ohio Wesleyan)
- Greg Rosnick (Haverford)
- Anjalé Barrett (Maryland)

Legend

- (C) Team captain
- (S) Suspended
- (I) Ineligible
- (W) Walk-on
- Injured
- Current redshirt

Roster
Last update: March 9, 2023

2019-20 Ivy Awards and Recognition
- Abbey Hsu – Second Team All-Ivy
- Sienna Durr – Second Team All-Ivy

== Schedule ==
Date time, TV	Rank^{#}	Opponent^{#}	Result	Record	Site (attendance) city, state
Non-conference regular season
November 5, 2019*; 7:00 pm		at Albany	L 78–82	0–1	SEFCU Arena (1,083); Albany, NY
November 7, 2019*; 7:00 pm		Saint Joseph's	L 57–71	0–2	Levien Gymnasium (351); New York, NY
November 10, 2019*; 2:00 pm		Fordham	W 70–51	1–2	Levien Gymnasium (513); New York, NY
November 15, 2019*; 7:00 pm		at Buffalo	L 75–82	1–3	Alumni Arena (1,502); Buffalo, NY
November 17, 2019*; 5:00 pm		at Robert Morris	W 61–59	2–3	UPMC Events Center (351); Moon Township, PA
November 23, 2019*; 1:00 pm		at Army	W 71–62	3–3	Christl Arena (658); West Point, NY
November 30, 2019*; 1:00 pm		Milwaukee	W 74–46	4–3	Levien Gymnasium (361); New York, NY
December 6, 2019*; 11:00 am		Georgetown	W 54–49	5–3	Levien Gymnasium (2,514); New York, NY
December 9, 2019*; 7:00 pm		Davidson	W 63–60	6–3	Levien Gymnasium (357); New York, NY
December 21, 2019*; 12:00 pm		NJIT	W 99–43	7–3	Levien Gymnasium (371); New York, NY
December 29, 2019*; 2:00 pm		at Vanderbilt	L 51–72	7–4	Memorial Gymnasium (1700); Nashville, TN
December 30, 2019*; 2:00 pm		at Tennessee State	W 75–65	8–4	Gentry Complex (323); Nashville, TN
January 4, 2020*; 2:00 pm		Mercer	W 77–48	9–4	Levien Gymnasium (587); New York, NY
Ivy League regular season
January 18, 2020; 1:00 pm		Cornell	W 76–66	10–4 (1–0)	Levien Gymnasium (821); New York, NY
January 25, 2020; 1:00 pm		at Cornell	L 77–80	10–5 (1–1)	Newman Arena (515); Ithaca, NY
January 31, 2020; 6:00 pm		Yale	L 60–85	10–6 (1–2)	Levien Gymnasium (759); New York, NY
February 1, 2020; 5:00 pm		Brown	W 74–60	11–6 (2–2)	Levien Gymnasium (682); New York, NY
February 7, 2020; 7:00 pm		at Penn	L 84–86	11–7 (2–3)	The Palestra (804); Philadelphia, PA
February 8, 2020; 5:00 pm		at Princeton	L 55–77	11–8 (2–4)	Jadwin Gymnasium (1,806); Princeton, NJ
February 14, 2020; 7:00 pm		Dartmouth; Play4Kay Game	W 73–63	12–8 (3–4)	Levien Gymnasium (379); New York, NY
February 15, 2020; 5:00 pm		Harvard	W 89–64	13–8 (4–4)	Levien Gymnasium (879); New York, NY
February 21, 2020; 6:00 pm		at Brown	W 76–66	14–8 (5–4)	Pizzitola Sports Center (258); Providence, RI
February 22, 2020; 4:00 pm		at Yale	W 74–65	15–8 (6–4)	John J. Lee Amphitheater (717); New Haven, CT
February 28, 2020; 7:00 pm		at Harvard	W 62–57	16–8 (7–4)	Lavietes Pavilion (456); Cambridge, MA
February 29, 2020; 5:00 pm		at Dartmouth	W 62–50	17–8 (8–4)	Leede Arena (675); Hanover, NH
March 6, 2020; 7:00 pm	No. 21/17	Princeton; Pride Game	L 52–77	17–9 (8–5)	Levien Gymnasium (1,223); New York, NY
March 7, 2020; 5:00 pm		Penn; Senior Night	L 36–51	17–10 (8–6)	Levien Gymnasium (1,065); New York, NY
Ivy League Tournament
March 13, 2020		vs. Princeton	Cancelled		Lavietes Pavilion; Cambridge, MA
*Non-conference game. ^{#}Rankings from AP Poll. (#) Tournament seedings in parentheses. All times are in Eastern Time.

== See also ==
- 2019–20 Columbia Lions men's basketball team
