= Megan Griffith =

American college basketball coach

Current position
- Title: Head coach
- Team: Columbia
- Conference: Ivy League
- Record: 171–99 (.633)

Biographical details
- Born: September 4, 1985 (age 41)

Playing career
- 2003–2007: Columbia

Coaching career (HC unless noted)
- 2012–2016: Princeton (assistant)
- 2016–present: Columbia

Head coaching record
- Overall: 171–99 (.633)

Accomplishments and honors

Championships
- WBIT (2026); 3x Ivy League regular season (2023–2025)

Awards
- 3x Ivy League Coach of the Year (2023–2025)

Megan Griffith (born September 4, 1985) is an American college basketball coach and current head coach of the Columbia Lions women's basketball team. Since joining Columbia in 2016, Griffith has built up the program and led the Lions to the winningest stretch in the program's NCAA Division I history. She is the all-time winningest coach in program history. Griffith coached the team to its first regular season Ivy League title in 2023. The Lions repeated as champions in 2024 and went on to earn the program's first berth into the NCAA Division I Women's Basketball Tournament.

Griffith is the former assistant women's basketball coach and recruiting coordinator at Princeton. During Griffith's time at Princeton, the Tigers reached the postseason each year and earned five Ivy League titles.

== Biography ==
=== Early life and education ===
Griffith is from King of Prussia, Pennsylvania and was a three-sport athlete at Villa Maria Academy, playing basketball, lacrosse, and volleyball. As a basketball player, she was a two-time team captain and earned first team Main Line Times honors her junior and senior year. Her team won the PIAA District 1 Championship in 2002. Griffith went on to play basketball for the Columbia Lions women's basketball team from 2003 to 2007, captaining the team for three seasons and earning All-Ivy honors in 2006 and 2007. She scored a total of 1,061 career points, making her one of 12 Lions to score more than 1,000 points in her career. She majored in economics and was a two-time Academic All-Ivy selection.

=== Professional career ===
After graduation, Griffith played professional basketball in Europe from 2007 to 2010. She was a member of the FoA Nice Basketball team in Forssa, Finland and was named MVP at the end of the 2007–08 season. She played for Espoo from 2008 to 2009 and led the team to the National Finnish Championship and the Finnish Cup Championship titles. During the 2009–10 season, she played for the Celeritas-Donar basketball team in Groningen, Netherlands.

== Columbia statistics ==
Legend
GP	Games played	GS	Games started	MPG	Minutes per game
FG%	Field goal percentage	3P%	3-point field goal percentage	FT%	Free throw percentage
RPG	Rebounds per game	APG	Assists per game	SPG	Steals per game
BPG	Blocks per game	PPG	Points per game	**Bold**	Career high

Year	Team	GP	Points	FG%	3P%	FT%	RPG	APG	SPG	BPG	PPG
2003–04	Columbia	23	60	29.6%	33.3%	77.4%	0.8	1.0	0.5	-	2.6
2004–05	Columbia	27	213	**38.7%**	34.7%	**83.9%**	2.2	3.5	1.5	0.0	7.9
2005–06	Columbia	**33**	**410**	38.7%	**35.7%**	73.5%	**3.0**	**5.5**	1.7	-	**15.2**
2006–07	Columbia	28	378	36.0%	28.9%	76.6%	2.4	3.8	**2.0**	-	13.5
Career		105	1061	37.1%	32.3%	76.6%	2.2	3.6	1.4	0.0	10.1

== Head coaching record ==
Record table
Season	Team	Overall	Conference	Standing	Postseason
**Columbia Lions** (Ivy League) (2016–present)
2016–17	Columbia	13–14	3–11	T–7th	
2017–18	Columbia	8–21	2–12	8th	
2018–19	Columbia	8–19	4–10	7th	
2019–20	Columbia	17–10	8–6	4th	Postseason not held
2020–21	Columbia	Season Cancelled			
2021–22	Columbia	25–7	12–2	2nd	WNIT Quarterfinals
2022–23	Columbia	28–6	12–2	T–1st	WNIT Runner-Up
2023–24	Columbia	23–7	13–1	T–1st	NCAA Division I First Four
2024–25	Columbia	24–7	13–1	T–1st	NCAA Division I First Round
2025–26	Columbia	25–8	11–3	2nd	WBIT Champions
Columbia:		171–99 (.633)	78–48 (.619)		
Total:		171–99 (.633)			
National champion Postseason invitational champion Conference regular season champion Conference regular season and conference tournament champion Division regular season champion Division regular season and conference tournament champion Conference tournament champion
