= 2019–20 Princeton Tigers women's basketball team =

Intercollegiate basketball season

2019–20 Princeton Tigers women's basketball

Ivy League regular season champions
- Conference: Ivy League
- Record: 26–1 (14–0 Ivy)
- Head coach: Carla Berube (1st season)
- Assistant coaches: Dalila Eshe (1st season); Lauren Battista (1st season); Lauren Dillon (1st season)
- Home arena: Jadwin Gymnasium

2019–20 Ivy League women's basketball standings
	Conf.				Overall
Team	W		L	PCT	W		L	PCT
No. 22 Princeton	14	–	0	1.000	26	–	1	.963
Penn	10	–	4	.714	20	–	7	.741
Yale	9	–	5	.643	18	–	8	.692
Columbia	8	–	6	.571	17	–	10	.630
Harvard	6	–	8	.429	15	–	12	.556
Dartmouth	4	–	10	.286	10	–	17	.370
Cornell	3	–	11	.214	10	–	16	.385
Brown	2	–	12	.143	8	–	19	.296
† 2020 Ivy League Tournament; Ivy League Tournament canceled due to COVID-19 pandemic winner Rankings from AP Poll

The 2019–20 Princeton Tigers women's basketball team represented Princeton University during the 2019–20 NCAA Division I women's basketball season. The Tigers, led by first-year head coach Carla Berube, played their home games at Jadwin Gymnasium as members of the Ivy League.

The Tigers finished the season with a 26–1 overall record, 14–0 in the Ivy League. They won the conference's regular season championship.

The Ivy League Tournament and NCAA tournament was cancelled due to the COVID-19 outbreak.

== Previous season ==
The Tigers finished the 2017–18 season with a 22–10 overall record and 12–2 in the Ivy League. They tied Penn for first place in the conference's regular season to meet them in a playoff to determine which Ivy League team received a first-round bid for the NCAA tournament. The Tigers won, but lost in the first round to 17th-ranked Kentucky.

== Roster ==
2019–20 Princeton Tigers women's basketball team
Players
Coaches

Pos.	#	Name	Height	Year	Hometown
G/F	31	Bella Alarie	6 ft 4 in (1.93 m)	Sr	Bethesda, MD
F	22	Taylor Baur	6 ft 2 in (1.88 m)	Sr	St. Louis, MO
F	3	Sydney Boyer	6 ft 1 in (1.85 m)	Jr	Woodstock, GA
G	12	Maggie Connolly	5 ft 8 in (1.73 m)	So	Wilmington, DE
G	24	Julia Cunningham	5 ft 11 in (1.8 m)	So	Watchung, NJ
F	21	Kira Emsbo	6 ft 5 in (1.96 m)	So	Lakewood, CO
G	4	McKenna Haire	5 ft 10 in (1.78 m)	Jr	Charlotte, NC
G	2	Carlie Littlefield	5 ft 9 in (1.75 m)	Jr	Waukee, IA
F	40	Maya McArthur	6 ft 0 in (1.83 m)	Fr	Dana Point, CA
G	1	Abby Meyers	6 ft 0 in (1.83 m)	Fr	Potomac, MD
F	00	Ellie Mitchell	6 ft 0 in (1.83 m)	Fr	Chevy Chase, MD
G/F	14	Maddie Plank	5 ft 11 in (1.8 m)	Fr	Briarcliff Manor, NY
G	10	Grace Stone	5 ft 11 in (1.8 m)	So	Glen Cove, NY
G/F	33	Lexi Weger	6 ft 3 in (1.91 m)	So	Fairfax, VA
G/F	11	Neenah Young	5 ft 10 in (1.78 m)	So	Tracy, CA
G	13	Nicole Young	5 ft 8 in (1.73 m)	Fr	Tracy, CA

Head coach

- Carla Berube (Connecticut)

Assistant coach(es)

- Dalila Eshe (Florida)
- Lauren Battista (Bentley)
- Laruen Dillon (Tufts)

Legend

- (C) Team captain
- (S) Suspended
- (I) Ineligible
- (W) Walk-on
- Injured
- Current redshirt

Roster
Last update: April 27, 2020

2019-20 Ivy Awards and Recognition
- Bella Alarie – Player of the Year; First Team All-Ivy
- Carla Berube – Coach of the Year
- Carlie Littlefield – First Team All-Ivy
- Julia Cunningham – Honorable Mention

== Schedule ==
Date time, TV	Rank^{#}	Opponent^{#}	Result	Record	Site (attendance) city, state
Non-conference regular season
November 5, 2019*; 7:00 p.m.		Rider	W 80–47	1–0	Jadwin Gymnasium (650); Princeton, NJ
November 10, 2019*; 12:00 p.m.		at George Washington	W 75–50	2–0	Charles E. Smith Center (1,018); Washington, D.C.
November 15, 2019*; 7:30 p.m.		at Seton Hall	W 78–76	3–0	Walsh Gymnasium (795); South Orange, NJ
November 17, 2019*; 1:00 p.m.		Florida Gulf Coast	W 67–53	4–0	Jadwin Gymnasium (763); Princeton, NJ
November 20, 2019*; 7:30 p.m.		at Iowa	L 75–77 ^{OT}	4–1	Carver–Hawkeye Arena (5,885); Iowa City, IA
November 24, 2019*; 1:00 p.m.		Monmouth	W 52–40	5–1	Jadwin Gymnasium (725); Princeton, NJ
December 1, 2019*; 1:00 p.m.		St. Francis Brooklyn	W 76–44	6–1	Jadwin Gymnasium (702); Princeton, NJ
December 7, 2019*; 7:00 p.m.		at Marist	W 62–50	7–1	McCann Arena (1,518); Poughkeepsie, NY
December 10, 2019*; 5:00 p.m.		Hartford	W 73–42	8–1	Jadwin Gymnasium (545); Princeton, NJ
December 14, 2019*; 3:00 p.m., NBC Sports Philadelphia		Penn State	W 72–55	9–1	Jadwin Gymnasium (869); Princeton, NJ
December 18, 2019*; 8:00 p.m., SECN+		at Missouri	W 68–33	10–1	Mizzou Arena (3,694); Columbia, MO
December 20, 2019*; 8:00 p.m.		at Saint Louis	W 66–50	11–1	Chaifetz Arena (606); St. Louis, MO
December 29, 2019*; 1:00 p.m.		New Hampshire	W 77–37	12–1	Jadwin Gymnasium (989); Princeton, NJ
Ivy League Regular season
January 11, 2020; 1:00 p.m.	No. 25	at Penn	W 75–55	13–1 (1–0)	Palestra (1,414); Philadelphia, PA
January 31, 2020; 7:00 p.m.		at Dartmouth	W 66–34	14–1 (2–0)	Leede Arena (756); Hanover, NH
February 1, 2020; 5:00 p.m.		at Harvard	W 60–46	15–1 (3–0)	Lavietes Pavilion (1,636); Boston, MA
February 7, 2020; 6:00 p.m.		Cornell	W 60–29	16–1 (4–0)	Jadwin Gymnasium (976); Princeton, NJ
February 8, 2020; 5:00 p.m.		Columbia	W 77–55	17–1 (5–0)	Jadwin Gymnasium (1,806); Princeton, NJ
February 14, 2020; 6:00 p.m.		at Yale	W 55–39	18–1 (6–0)	Payne Whitney Gymnasium (551); New Haven, CT
February 15, 2020; 5:00 p.m., NESN+		at Brown	W 85–48	19–1 (7–0)	Pizzitola Sports Center (610); Providence, RI
February 21, 2020; 6:00 p.m.	No. 25	Harvard	W 66–45	20–1 (8–0)	Jadwin Gymnasium (957); Princeton, NJ
February 22, 2020; 6:00 p.m.	No. 25	Dartmouth	W 87–55	21–1 (9–0)	Jadwin Gymnasium (1,450); Princeton, NJ
February 25, 2020; 7:00 p.m., NBC Sports Philadelphia	No. 23	Penn	W 80–44	22–1 (10–0)	Jadwin Gymnasium (743); Princeton, NJ
February 28, 2020; 6:00 p.m.	No. 23	Brown	W 81–39	23–1 (11–0)	Jadwin Gymnasium (852); Princeton, NJ
February 29, 2020 p.m., NBC Sports Philadelphia	No. 23	Yale	W 64–49	24–1 (12–0)	Jadwin Gymnasium (1,144); Princeton, NJ
March 6, 2020; 7:00 p.m.	No. 21	at Columbia	W 77–52	25–1 (13–0)	Levien Gymnasium (1,233); New York, NY
March 7, 2020; 5:00 p.m.	No. 21	at Cornell	W 69–50	26–1 (14–0)	Newman Arena (328); Ithaca, NY
Ivy League Tournament
March 13, 2020	(1)	vs. (4) Columbia; Semifinals	Cancelled		Lavietes Pavilion; Boston, MA
*Non-conference game. ^{#}Rankings from AP Poll. (#) Tournament seedings in parentheses. All times are in Eastern Time.
