= Stephanie Glance =

American basketball coach

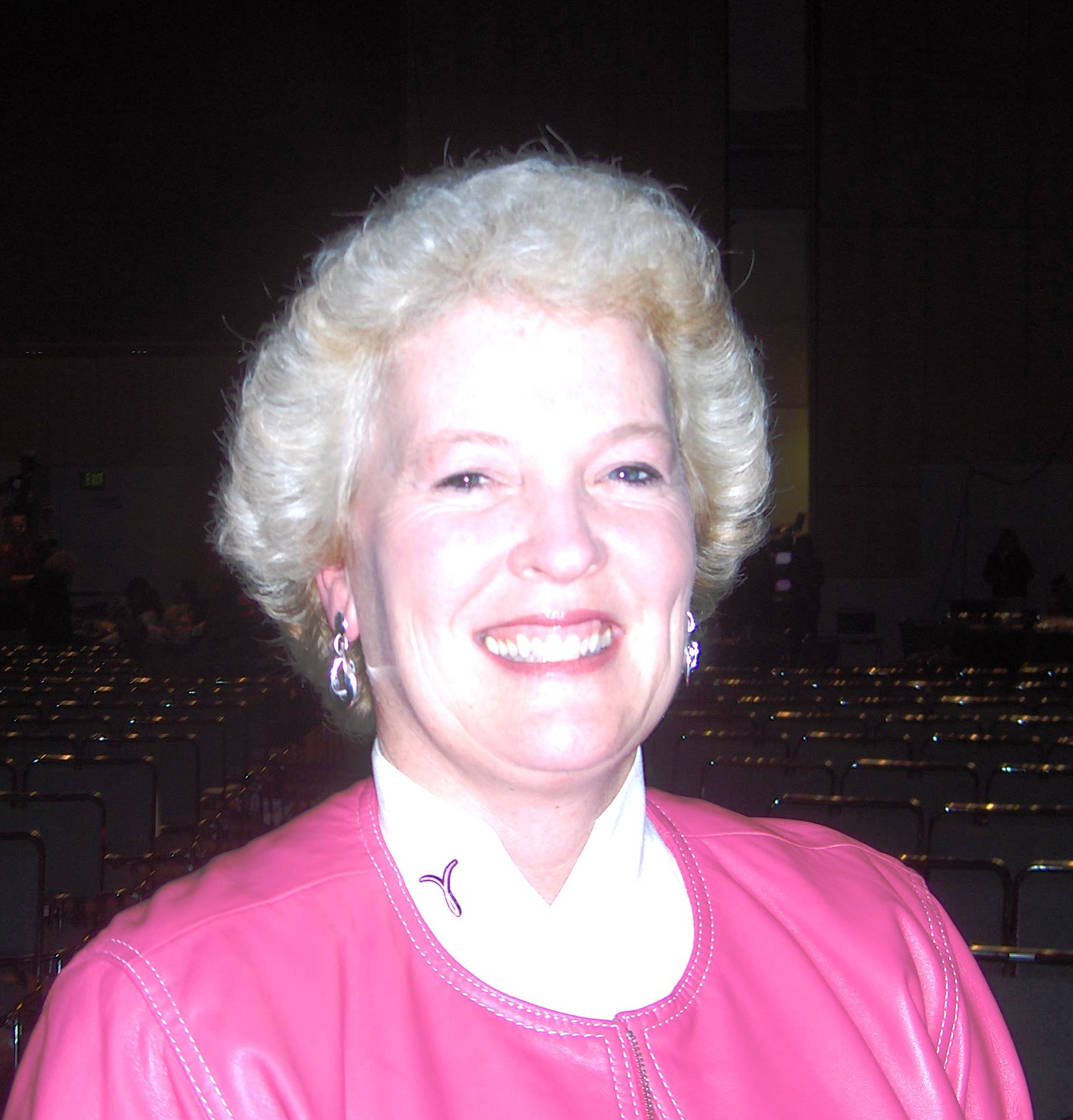
- Glance in 2011

Biographical details
- Born: Waynesville, North Carolina, U.S.

Playing career
- 1982–1985: Rollins College

Coaching career (HC unless noted)
- 1988–1993: South Florida (asst.)
- 1993–1994: Texas State (asst.)
- 1994–2006: NC State (asst.)
- 2006–2007: NC State (interim head)
- 2007–2008: NC State (asst.)
- 2008–2009: NC State (interim head)
- 2009–2010: Tennessee (asst.)
- 2010–2013: Illinois State
- 2013–2015: Columbia

Head coaching record
- Overall: 96–93 (.508)

Stephanie Glance is an American basketball coach.

== Career ==
She was hired as the head women's basketball coach at Columbia University in April 2013. She had spent the previous three years s the head coach at Illinois State University. She was a special assistant at the University of Tennessee under Pat Summitt, the all-time winningest NCAA Basketball coach and was the former interim head coach of the women's basketball team at North Carolina State University, succeeding Kay Yow in 2009. The 2008–09 season is her 15th with the team, as she was previously an associate head coach and recruiting coordinator.

In her first year at Illinois State, the team had a record of 24 wins and 11 losses. The WBCA recognized this performance by selecting her for the Maggie Dixon Award, which is awarded to the coach with the best performance in their rookie year as a head coach.

After coaching for three years at Illinois State, she was hired as head women's basketball coach at Columbia University. She coached there for two seasons before stepping down to be the new Executive Director of the Kay Yow Cancer Fund.

Glance is from Waynesville, NC and a former student of Tuscola High School.

== Head coaching record ==
Source: Columbia

Record table
| Season | Team | Overall | Conference | Standing | Postseason |
|---|---|---|---|---|---|
NC State (Atlantic Coast Conference) (2006–2007)
| 2006–07 | NC State | 10–6 | 2–3 | | |
NC State (Atlantic Coast Conference) (2008–2009)
| 2008–09 | NC State | 5–10 | 5–9 | | |
| NC State: | | 15–16 | 7–12 | | |
Illinois State (Missouri Valley Conference) (2010–2013)
| 2010–11 | Illinois State | 24–11 | 12–6 | T–2nd | WNIT Semifinals |
| 2011–12 | Illinois State | 19–13 | 13–5 | 2nd | WNIT Second Round |
| 2012–13 | Illinois State | 24–11 | 12–6 | 3rd | WNIT Second Round |
| Illinois State: | | 67–35 (.657) | 37–17 (.685) | | |
Columbia (Ivy League) (2013–2015)
| 2013–14 | Columbia | 6–22 | 3–11 | 7th | |
| 2014–15 | Columbia | 8–20 | 2–12 | 8th | |
| Columbia: | | 14–42 (.250) | 5–23 (.179) | | |
| Total: | | 96–93 (.508) | | | |
National champion Postseason invitational champion Conference regular season champion Conference regular season and conference tournament champion Division regular season champion Division regular season and conference tournament champion Conference tournament champion
