= 2017–18 Princeton Tigers women's basketball team =

Intercollegiate basketball season

2017–18 Princeton Tigers women's basketball

Ivy League regular season and tournament champions

NCAA women's tournament, first round
- Conference: Ivy League
- Record: 24–6 (12–2 Ivy)
- Head coach: Courtney Banghart (11th season)
- Assistant coaches: Milena Flores (11th season); Carrie Moore (2nd season); Kaitlyn Cresencia (1st season)
- Home arena: Jadwin Gymnasium

2017–18 Ivy League women's basketball standings
| | Conf. | | | | Overall |
| Team | W | | L | PCT | W | | L | PCT |
|---|---|---|---|---|---|---|---|---|
| Princeton † | 12 | – | 2 | .857 | 24 | – | 6 | .800 |
| Penn | 11 | – | 3 | .786 | 22 | – | 9 | .710 |
| Harvard | 10 | – | 4 | .714 | 18 | – | 11 | .621 |
| Yale | 8 | – | 6 | .571 | 19 | – | 13 | .594 |
| Dartmouth | 7 | – | 7 | .500 | 15 | – | 12 | .556 |
| Brown | 3 | – | 11 | .214 | 15 | – | 12 | .556 |
| Cornell | 3 | – | 11 | .214 | 7 | – | 20 | .259 |
| Columbia | 2 | – | 12 | .143 | 8 | – | 21 | .276 |
† 2018 Ivy League Tournament winner Rankings from AP Poll

The 2017–18 Princeton Tigers women's basketball team represented Princeton University during the 2017–18 NCAA Division I women's basketball season. The Tigers, led by eleventh year head coach Courtney Banghart, played their home games at Jadwin Gymnasium as members of the Ivy League.

The Tigers finished the season with a 24–6 overall record and 12–2 in the Ivy League. They finished first in the conference and defeated Penn in a playoff to earn a 12-seed for the NCAA tournament. However, they lost in the first round to 5-seed Maryland.

== Previous season ==
The Tigers finished the 2016–17 season with a 16–14 overall record and 9–5 in the Ivy League. They finished second in the conference to play Penn in a playoff to determine which Ivy League team will get a first-round bid for the NCAA tournament. Penn won, but the Tigers' postseason continued with play in the Women's National Invitation Tournament. However, they lost in the first round to Villanova.

During the season, freshman Bella Alarie was named USBWA National Freshman of the Week once, Ivy League Player of the Week three times, and Ivy League Rookie of the Week nine times. She went on to be named Ivy League Rookie of the Year, made the Ivy League All-Tournament Team (with junior Leslie Robinson), as well as the All-Ivy League team (also with Robinson).

Alarie was also named to the 2017 USA Basketball Women's U19 National Team. The team won a silver medal, after losing to Russia in the finals. Coach Courtney Banghart was on the coaching staff of the U23 National Team. The team competed in and won the inaugural U24 Four Nations Tournament in Tokyo, Japan.

== Roster ==
2017–18 Princeton Tigers women's basketball team
Players
Coaches

| Pos. | # | Name | Height | Year | Hometown |
|---|---|---|---|---|---|
| G/F | 31 | Bella Alarie | 6 ft 4 in (1.93 m) | So | Bethesda, MD |
| F | 22 | Taylor Baur | 6 ft 2 in (1.88 m) | So | St. Louis, MO |
| F | 3 | Sydney Boyer | 6 ft 1 in (1.85 m) | Fr | Woodstock, GA |
| G/F | 5 | Caroline Davis | 6 ft 0 in (1.83 m) | Jr | Newark, DE |
| F | 4 | McKenna Haire | 5 ft 10 in (1.78 m) | Fr | Charlotte, NC |
| G | 24 | Kenya Holland | 5 ft 8 in (1.73 m) | Sr | Stafford, VA |
| G | 23 | Qalea Ismail | 6 ft 1 in (1.85 m) | Jr | Bel Air, MD |
| G/F | 20 | Sydney Jordan | 6 ft 0 in (1.83 m) | Jr | Manassas, VA |
| G | 2 | Carlie Littlefield | 5 ft 9 in (1.75 m) | Fr | Waukee, IA |
| G | 11 | Abby Meyers | 6 ft 0 in (1.83 m) | Fr | Potomac, MD |
| G | 0 | Jordan Muhammad | 5 ft 8 in (1.73 m) | Jr | Charlotte, NC |
| G | 10 | Jordan Reid | 5 ft 7 in (1.7 m) | Jr | DeWitt, MI |
| F | 45 | Leslie Robinson | 6 ft 0 in (1.83 m) | Sr | Corvallis, OR |
| G | 25 | Gabrielle Rush | 5 ft 10 in (1.78 m) | Jr | Hinsdale, IL |
| F | 33 | Jordan Stallworth | 6 ft 0 in (1.83 m) | So | Buford, GA |
| G | 32 | Tia Weledji | 5 ft 10 in (1.78 m) | Sr | Overland Park, KS |

Head coach

- Courtney Banghart (Dartmouth)

Assistant coach(es)

- Milena Flores (Stanford)
- Carrie Moore (Western Michigan)
- Kaitlyn Cresencia (Connecticut College)

Legend

- (C) Team captain
- (S) Suspended
- (I) Ineligible
- (W) Walk-on
- Injured
- Current redshirt

Roster
Last update: July 21, 2017

2017-18 Ivy Awards and Recognition
- Bella Alarie – Player of the Year; First Team All-Ivy
- Courtney Banghart – Coach of the Year
- Leslie Robinson – First Team All-Ivy

== Schedule ==
| Date time, TV | Rank^{#} | Opponent^{#} | Result | Record | Site (attendance) city, state |
Regular season
| Nov 10, 2017*; 6:30 pm | | George Washington | W 72–52 | 1–0 | Jadwin Gymnasium (803); Princeton, NJ |
| Nov 16, 2017*; 7:00 pm | | at Seton Hall | W 85–83 | 2–0 | Walsh Gymnasium (716); South Orange, NJ |
| Nov 19, 2017*; 1:00 pm, ESPN3 | | Georgia Tech | L 56–67 | 2–1 | Jadwin Gymnasium (852); Princeton, NJ |
| Nov 25, 2017*; 1:00 pm | | at Davidson | W 63–57 | 3–1 | John M. Belk Arena (523); Davidson, NC |
| Nov 29, 2017*; 5:30 pm | | No. 25 Villanova | L 59–62 | 3–2 | Jadwin Gymnasium (525); Princeton, NJ |
| Dec 2, 2017*; 5:00 pm, NBCSPHI+ | | Delaware | W 78–60 | 4–2 | Jadwin Gymnasium (699); Princeton, NJ |
| Dec 6, 2017*; 6:00 pm | | at Lafayette | W 53–45 | 5–2 | Kirby Sports Center (554); Easton, PA |
| Dec 9, 2017*; 1:00 pm | | at Quinnipiac | W 60–46 | 6–2 | TD Bank Sports Center (502); Hamden, CT |
| Dec 13, 2017*; 6:00 pm, BTN | | at Rutgers; Rivalry | L 50–70 | 6–3 | Louis Brown Athletic Center (1,247); Piscataway, NJ |
| Dec 17, 2017*; 1:00 pm | | at Wagner | W 58–37 | 7–3 | Spiro Sports Center (147); Staten Island, NY |
| Dec 20, 2017*; 2:30 pm | | vs. St. Joseph's; Gator Holiday Classic | W 63–54 | 8–3 | O'Connell Center (1,054); Gainesville, FL |
| Dec 21, 2017*; 2:30 pm | | vs. Chattanooga; Gator Holiday Classic | W 59–49 | 9–3 | O'Connell Center (1,008); Gainesville, FL |
| Dec 30, 2017*; 4:00 pm | | UMBC | W 77–40 | 10–3 | Jadwin Gymnasium (828); Princeton, NJ |
Ivy League regular season
| Jan 6, 2018; 1:00 pm, NBCSPHI+ | | at Penn | W 70–55 | 11–3 (1–0) | Palestra (1,003); Philadelphia, PA |
| Jan 12, 2018; 5:30 pm | | Columbia | W 69–47 | 12–3 (2–0) | Jadwin Gymnasium (679); Princeton, NJ |
| Jan 13, 2018; 4:30 pm | | Cornell | W 75–54 | 13–3 (3–0) | Jadwin Gymnasium (760); Princeton, NJ |
| Feb 2, 2018; 6:00 pm | | at Yale | L 59–73 | 13–4 (3–1) | John J. Lee Amphitheater (688); New Haven, CT |
| Feb 3, 2018; 4:00 pm | | at Brown | W 77–62 | 14–4 (4–1) | Pizzitola Sports Center (402); Providence, RI |
| Feb 9, 2018; 6:30 pm, ESPN3 | | Harvard | W 80–47 | 15–4 (5–1) | Jadwin Gymnasium (986); Princeton, NJ |
| Feb 10, 2018; 5:00 pm | | Dartmouth | W 82–63 | 16–4 (6–1) | Jadwin Gymnasium (1,091); Princeton, NJ |
| Feb 13, 2018; 6:30 pm, NBCSPHI+ | | Penn | W 60–40 | 17–4 (7–1) | Jadwin Gymnasium (672); Princeton, NJ |
| Feb 16, 2018; 6:00 pm | | at Cornell | W 72–40 | 18–4 (8–1) | Newman Arena (424); Ithaca, NY |
| Feb 17, 2018; 4:30 pm, SNY | | at Columbia | W 74–46 | 19–4 (9–1) | Levien Gymnasium (469); New York City, NY |
| Feb 23, 2018; 7:00 pm, ESPN3 | | at Dartmouth | W 79–67 | 20–4 (10–1) | Leede Arena (796); Hanover, NH |
| Feb 24, 2018; 7:00 pm, NESN+ | | at Harvard | L 58–72 | 20–5 (10–2) | Lavietes Pavilion (1,085); Cambridge, MA |
| Mar 2, 2018; 6:30 pm, ESPN3 | | Brown | W 79–44 | 21–5 (11–2) | Jadwin Gymnasium (743); Princeton, NJ |
| Mar 3, 2018; 5:00 pm | | Yale | W 64–53 | 22–5 (12–2) | Jadwin Gymnasium (1,272); Princeton, NJ |
Ivy League Tournament
| Mar 10, 2018; 6:00 pm, ESPN3 | (1) | vs. (4) Yale; Semifinals | W 78–57 | 23–5 | Palestra; Philadelphia, PA |
| Mar 11, 2018; 4:00 pm, ESPNU | (1) | vs. (2) Penn; Championship Game | W 63–34 | 24–5 | Palestra; Philadelphia, PA |
NCAA Women's Tournament
| Mar 16, 2018*; Noon, ESPN2 | (12 KC) | vs. (5 KC) No. 16 Maryland; First Round | L 57–77 | 24–6 | Reynolds Coliseum; Raleigh, NC |
*Non-conference game. ^{#}Rankings from AP Poll. (#) Tournament seedings in parentheses. KC=Kansas City Region. All times are in Eastern Time.

== Rankings ==
2017–18 NCAA Division I women's basketball rankings

Regular season polls
| Poll | Pre- Season | Week 2 | Week 3 | Week 4 | Week 5 | Week 6 | Week 7 | Week 8 | Week 9 | Week 10 | Week 11 | Week 12 | Week 13 | Week 14 | Week 15 | Week 16 | Week 17 | Week 18 | Week 19 | Final |
|---|---|---|---|---|---|---|---|---|---|---|---|---|---|---|---|---|---|---|---|---|
| AP | | | RV | | | | | | | | | | | | | | | | | N/A |
| Coaches | | | | | | | | | | | | | | | | | | | | |

Legend
| | Increase in ranking |
| | Decrease in ranking |
| | No change |
| (RV) | Received votes |
| (NR) | Not ranked previous week |
