= 2018 Ivy League women's basketball tournament =

Women's basketball tournament

- Classification: Division I
- Season: 2017–18
- Teams: 4
- Site: Palestra; Philadelphia, Pennsylvania
- Champions: Princeton (1st title)
- Winning coach: Courtney Banghart (1st title)
- Television: ESPNU, ESPN3

2017–18 Ivy League women's basketball standings
| | Conf. | | | | Overall |
| Team | W | | L | PCT | W | | L | PCT |
|---|---|---|---|---|---|---|---|---|
| Princeton † | 12 | – | 2 | .857 | 24 | – | 6 | .800 |
| Penn | 11 | – | 3 | .786 | 22 | – | 9 | .710 |
| Harvard | 10 | – | 4 | .714 | 18 | – | 11 | .621 |
| Yale | 8 | – | 6 | .571 | 19 | – | 13 | .594 |
| Dartmouth | 7 | – | 7 | .500 | 15 | – | 12 | .556 |
| Brown | 3 | – | 11 | .214 | 15 | – | 12 | .556 |
| Cornell | 3 | – | 11 | .214 | 7 | – | 20 | .259 |
| Columbia | 2 | – | 12 | .143 | 8 | – | 21 | .276 |
† 2018 Ivy League Tournament winner Rankings from AP Poll

The 2018 Ivy League women's basketball tournament is a women's college conference tournament held March 10 and 11, 2018, at the Palestra on the campus of the University of Pennsylvania in Philadelphia. Princeton defeated Penn, 63–34, in the championship game to earn the Ivy League's automatic bid to the 2018 NCAA tournament.

== Seeds ==
Only the top four teams in the 2017–18 Ivy League regular-season standings participated in the tournament and were seeded according to their records in conference play, resulting in a Shaughnessy playoff.

| Seed | School | Conference |
|---|---|---|
| 1 | Princeton | 12–2 (24–5) |
| 2 | Penn | 11–3 (21–8) |
| 3 | Harvard | 10–4 (18–10) |
| 4 | Yale | 8–6 (15–13) |

== Schedule ==
| Session | Game | Time* | Matchup^{#} | Television | Attendance |
Semifinals – Saturday, March 10
| 1 | 1 | 6:00 PM | #1 Princeton vs. #4 Yale | ESPN3 | |
| 1 | 2 | 8:30 PM | #2 Penn vs. #3 Harvard | ESPN3 | |
Championship – Sunday, March 11
| 2 | 3 | 4:00 PM | #1 Princeton vs. #2 Penn | ESPNU | |

*Game times in Eastern Time. #Rankings denote tournament seeding.

== Bracket ==
Semifinals; Saturday, March 10; The Palestra
1 | Princeton | 78
4 | Yale | 57
2 | Penn | 57
3 | Harvard | 52

Final; Sunday, March 11; The Palestra
1 | Princeton | 63
2 | Penn | 34

== See also ==
- 2018 Ivy League men's basketball tournament
