= Catherine McAuley High School =

Location
- 631 Stevens Avenue; Portland, Maine 04103; United States; 43°40′48″N 70°17′37″W

Information
- Type: Private, All-girls, college preparatory school
- Established: 1969
- Status: closed
- Closed: end of 2015-16 school year
- President: Dorothy Olaru
- Principal: Katherine Barr
- Teaching staff: 17.6 FTE
- Grades: 9–12
- Enrollment: 158 (2013–14)
- Student to teacher ratio: 9:1
- Campus size: 12 acres (4.9 ha)
- Colors: Green and Gold
- Mascot: McAuley Lion
- Accreditation: New England Association of Schools and Colleges
- Newspaper: Between the Lions
- Website: mcauleyhs.org

Catherine McAuley High School was an all-girls' college preparatory school in Portland, Maine. Run by the Sisters of Mercy, it was located in the Roman Catholic Diocese of Portland. The school was established in 1969 and was named for the Sisters' founder, Catherine McAuley. Catherine McAuley High School was the successor school of two other all-women's Mercy schools, Saint Joseph's Academy (1881–1969) and Cathedral High School (1909–1969). In July 2016, the school building was transferred to The Maine Girls' Academy. In July 2018, The Maine Girls' Academy announced that it would not reopen for the following school year.

== Campus ==
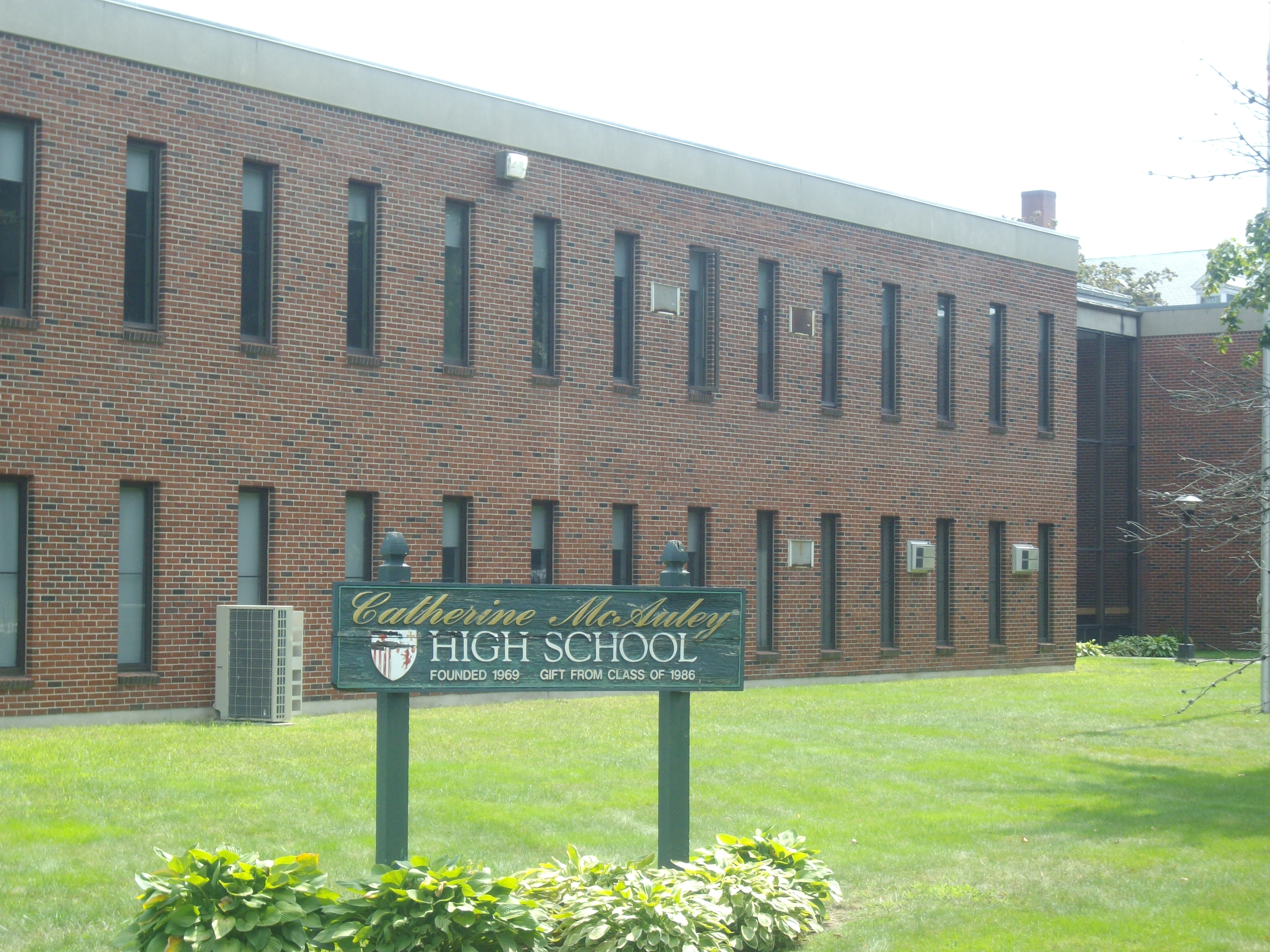
Catherine McAuley in 2009

Located in Portland's Deering Center neighborhood, McAuley's classrooms and offices were housed in the main building, the gymnasium, and the Academy. The main building and gym, designed by Portland architect Wilbur R. Ingalls, Jr., were connected by the glass-enclosed "mall," which acts as both atrium and cafeteria. The former St. Joseph's Academy building housed the Advancement Office as well as Latin, Spanish, history, art, and some of the math and religious studies classrooms. In 2005, the Sisters of Mercy donated land to the school so that the students could have several new athletic fields. The land once held shrines to saints, stations of the cross, and a grotto to the Blessed Virgin Mother Mary. McAuley High added a wireless network in 2006.

== Academics ==
Catherine McAuley offered an honors track as well as six AP courses. Students completed yearly service requirements in order to graduate. In addition to their service requirement, seniors completed a service project in May prior to graduation.

== Extra-curricular activities and athletics ==
=== Athletics ===
The school offered Class-A cross country, field hockey, soccer, basketball, cheering, indoor track, swimming, lacrosse, softball, tennis, and track and field.
