= Columbia Lions women's basketball =

Women's basketball program representing Columbia University

Columbia Lions
2026–27 Columbia Lions women's basketball team
- University: Columbia University
- First season: 1984
- Head coach: Megan Griffith (11th season)
- Location: New York City, New York
- Arena: Levien Gymnasium (capacity: 2,500)
- Conference: Ivy League
- Nickname: Lions
- Colors: Columbia blue and white
- Student section: TBD
- All-time record: 442–718 (.381)

NCAA Division I tournament appearances
- 2024, 2025

Conference regular-season champions
- 2023, 2024, 2025

Uniforms
Home	Away	Alternate

The Columbia Lions women's basketball team is the intercollegiate women's basketball program representing Columbia University. The school competes in the Ivy League in Division I of the National Collegiate Athletic Association (NCAA). The Lions play home basketball games at the Levien Gymnasium in New York, New York, on the university campus. Columbia has won three Ivy League championships. The team has been coached by Megan Griffith since 2016.

== History ==
They joined the Ivy League in women's basketball in 1986 after two seasons in Division III play. The women's teams used to be known as the Barnard Bears, named for the affiliated women's college of the same name. After the 2023–24 season, the Lions have a 442–718 record since beginning play in 1984 after Columbia went co-ed in 1983.

For their first 23 seasons, they never finished higher than fourth in the eight-team conference.

=== 2019–present ===
Megan Griffith's tenure as head coach has brought about a marked improvement in the Lions' standing in both the Ivy League conference and overall. In the 2019–20 season, the team qualified for the Ivy League Women's Basketball Tournament for the first time. They finished second in the 2022 Ivy League tournament, losing in the finals to Princeton. In 2022, Columbia began receiving votes in the AP poll for the first time in program history. In 2023, the team won a share of the Ivy League women’s basketball title, also for the first time in program history. On March 17, 2023, Griffith became the winningest head coach in program history after picking up her 95th career win.

The Lions made Ivy League history two seasons in a row, being the first Ivy League team to reach the WNIT quarterfinals in 2022 and the first to reach the semifinals or finals in 2023.

They received their first NCAA Tournament bid as an at-large bid in 2024, leaving only Yale as the one Ivy League team to never make the women's tournament. They won the Ivy regular season title once again in the 2024-25 season but lost in the championship game of the Ivy Tournament to Harvard. However, Columbia would receive an at-large bid to reach their second straight NCAA Tournament.

Notable players on the Columbia Women's Basketball roster include junior Abbey Hsu, 2023 Becky Hammon Mid-Major Player of the Year Award Semifinalist and 2022–23 First Team All-Ivy League, and senior Kaitlyn Davis, 2021–22 and 2022–23 First Team All-Ivy League. Both players joined the 1,000-point club in the 2022–23 season, along with senior Sienna Durr, becoming the 12th, 13th, and 14th Lions to do so in program history. On January 28, 2023, Kaitlyn Davis made history as the first player to ever record a triple-double in Columbia Women's Basketball history.

Year	Record	Conference Record	Coach
1984–85	19–7	n/a	Nancy Kalafus
1985–86	21–6	n/a	Nancy Kalafus
1986–87	8–16	2–12	Nancy Kalafus
1987–88	12–14	4–10	Nancy Kalafus
1988–89	12–14	5–9	Nancy Kalafus
1989–90	12–14	5–9	Nancy Kalafus
1990–91	10–16	5–9	Nancy Kalafus
1991–92	4–22	1–13	Kerry Phayre
1992–93	7–19	1–13	Kerry Phayre
1993–94	4–22	2–12	Kerry Phayre
1994–95	0–26	0–14	Kerry Phayre
1995–96	2–24	1–13	Kerry Phayre
1996–97	6–20	3–11	Jay Butler
1997–98	4–22	0–14	Jay Butler
1998–99	6–20	2–12	Jay Butler
1999–2000	7–19	6–8	Jay Butler
2000–01	9–18	6–8	Jay Butler
2002–03	11–16	4–10	Jay Butler
2003–04	12–14	6–8	Jay Butler
2004–05	12–15	5–9	Traci Waites/Tory Verdi
2005–06	6–21	2–12	Paul Nixon
2006–07	8–20	4–10	Paul Nixon
2007–08	10–18	7–7	Paul Nixon
2008–09	13–15	6–8	Paul Nixon
2009–10	18–10	9–5	Paul Nixon
2010–11	7–21	6–8	Paul Nixon
2011–12	3–25	1–13	Paul Nixon
2012–13	5–23	3–11	Paul Nixon
2013–14	6–22	3–11	Stephanie Glance
2014–15	8–20	2–12	Stephanie Glance
2015–16	12–17	1–13	Sheila Roux
2016–17	13–14	3–11	Megan Griffith
2017–18	8–21	2–12	Megan Griffith
2018–19	8–19	4–10	Megan Griffith
2019–20	17–10	8–6	Megan Griffith
2020–21	Season Cancelled Due to Covid		
2021–22	25–7	12–2	Megan Griffith
2022–23	28–6	12–2	Megan Griffith
2023–24	23–7	13-1	Megan Griffith

All-Time Coaching Records

Name	Years	Record	%	Conf. Record	Conf. %
Nancy Kalafus	1984–91 (7)	94–87	.519	21–49	.300
Kerry Phayre	1991–96 (5)	17–113	.131	5–65	.071
Jay Butler	1996–04 (8)	67–143	.319	33–79	.295
Traci Waites	2004–05 (<1)	9–8	.529	2–2	.500
Tory Verdi	2004–05 (<1)	3–7	.300	5–7	.417
Paul Nixon	2005–13 (8)	70–153	.314	39–74	.345
Stephanie Glance	2013–15 (2)	14–42	.250	5–23	.178
Sheila Roux	2015–16 (1)	12–17	.414	1–13	.071
Megan Griffith	2016–pres. (8)	122–84	.592	54–44	.551

== Postseason appearances ==
=== NCAA Division I ===
Columbia has appeared in two NCAA Tournaments. They have a record of 1–2.

Year	Seed	Round	Opponent	Results
2024	12	First Four	(12) Vanderbilt	L 68–72
2025	11	First Four; First round	(11) Washington (6) West Virginia	W 63–60; L 59–78

=== WNIT ===
Columbia has appeared in two Women's National Invitation Tournament (WNIT). They have a record of 8–2 and a Runners-up in 2023.

Year	Round	Opponent	Results
2022	First round Second round Third round Quarterfinals	Holy Cross; Old Dominion; Boston College; Seton Hall	W 80–69; W 62–59; W 54–51; L 75–78
2023	First round Second round Super 16; Great 8 Fab 4 Championship Game	FDU; Fordham; Syracuse; Harvard; Bowling Green; Kansas	W 69–53; W 78–73; W 88–82; W 77–71; W 77–70; L 59–66

=== WBIT ===
Columbia has appeared in one Women's Basketball Invitation Tournament (WBIT). They have a record of 5–0 and won the Championship in 2026.

Year	Round	Opponent	Results
2026	First round Second round Quarterfinals; Semifinals; Championship Game	St. John's; North Dakota State; California; Wisconsin; BYU	W 74–26; W 86–57; W 74–68; W 67–50; W 81–64
