= 2020 Ivy League women's basketball tournament =

- Classification: Division I
- Season: 2019–20
- Teams: 4
- Site: Lavietes Pavilion; Boston, Massachusetts
- Television: ESPN+, ESPNews

2019–20 Ivy League women's basketball standings
	Conf.				Overall
Team	W		L	PCT	W		L	PCT
No. 22 Princeton	14	–	0	1.000	26	–	1	.963
Penn	10	–	4	.714	20	–	7	.741
Yale	9	–	5	.643	18	–	8	.692
Columbia	8	–	6	.571	17	–	10	.630
Harvard	6	–	8	.429	15	–	12	.556
Dartmouth	4	–	10	.286	10	–	17	.370
Cornell	3	–	11	.214	10	–	16	.385
Brown	2	–	12	.143	8	–	19	.296
† 2020 Ivy League Tournament winner As of March 12, 2025 Ivy League Tournament canceled due to COVID-19 pandemic Rankings from AP Poll

The 2020 Ivy League women's basketball tournament was scheduled to be the women's college conference tournament held March 13 and 14, 2020, at the Lavietes Pavilion on the campus of Harvard University in Boston. (Note: Although Harvard's overall administration and undergraduate campus are in Cambridge, Massachusetts, the athletic department offices and almost all athletic venues, including Lavietes Pavilion, lie within the city limits of Boston.) The winner was to earn the Ivy League's automatic bid to the 2020 NCAA tournament. On March 10, 2020, the Ivy League announced it had cancelled the tournament due to the COVID-19 pandemic. As a result of winning the regular season title, Princeton was named the Ivy League's automatic qualifier for the NCAA Tournament.

== Seeds ==
Only the top four teams in the 2019–20 Ivy League regular-season standings were to participate in the tournament and be seeded according to their records in conference play, resulting in a Shaughnessy playoff.

Seed	School	Overall	Conference
1	Princeton	14–0	26–1
2	Penn	10–4	20–7
3	Yale	9–5	18–8
4	Columbia	8–6	17–10
