= The Maine Girls' Academy =

Location
- 631 Stevens Avenue; Portland, Maine 04103; United States
- 43.6800°N 70.2936°W

Information
- School type: Independent, nonsectarian high school for girls
- Established: 1 July 2016
- Closed: 5 July 2018
- Dean: Rebecca Redlon
- Head of school: Amy Jolly
- Grades: 9–12
- Enrollment: 120 (2015–2016)
- Campus size: 12 acres (4.9 ha)
- Colors: Green & gold
- Athletics conference: Southern Maine Activities Association (SMAA)
- Mascot: Lion
- Accreditation: New England Association of Schools and Colleges
- Publication: Mercian (magazine)
- School fees: US$17,250 (2017–2018)
- Website: www.mainegirlsacademy.org

The Maine Girls' Academy (MGA) was an independent high school for girls located in Portland, Maine. Founded in 2016 as the successor to Catherine McAuley High School, the school was nonsectarian and not sponsored by the Sisters of Mercy, which previously sponsored Catherine McAuley High School.

== History ==
In the 1980s, enrollment at Catherine McAuley was close to 300, but by 2005 was approximately 200 and for the 2015–2016 school year, was just 120. In 2014, the school's future was put in jeopardy when the Sisters of Mercy announced the sale of the property, which included the high school campus and the former motherhouse of the sisters. The Catherine McAuley High School announced plans to become an independent school, and the Sisters of Mercy decided not to sponsor the new school. The school began looking for a new campus, but the developer of the motherhouse property, Sea Coast Properties, agreed to extend the school's lease, and school officials said that Catherine McAuley planned to remain on that campus for at least 25 years.

It was announced at the end of the 2015–2016 school year that Catherine McAuley High School would become an independent, nonsectarian school on 1 July 2016, effectively discontinuing ties with both the Sisters of Mercy and the Roman Catholic Church. In the spring of 2016 the Sisters of Mercy told the school they could not use the name Catherine McAuley for the new school, and thus the community-wide search began for a new name. Some alumnae felt discontent with the loss of the school's name and Catholic identity, but many expressed hope for the future of the school as a nonsectarian establishment, which was partially a move to help increase enrollment. The Bishop of Portland, Robert Deeley, issued a statement afterward, writing that he was saddened by the decision, and wrote, "we regret the loss of a Catholic school in our diocese."

The six-week naming process yielded suggestions from faculty, students, parents and alumni. The more than 400 suggestions included Atlantic Academy, Coastal Maine Academy, Evergreen Academy, Baxter Woods Academy, Lionheart Academy, as well as names of prominent women from Maine and around the world. Ultimately, the naming committee decided on The Maine Girls' Academy, which they believed reflected its status as the only girls' school in the state of Maine.

On July 5, 2018, citing low enrollment that caused expenses to exceed income, the school announced it would not be re-opening for the upcoming school year.

== Academics ==
MGA offered eight Advanced Placement (AP) courses.

== Athletics ==
The Maine Girls' Academy was a member of the Southern Maine Activities Association (SMAA).

Sports
Basketball	Indoor/outdoor track
Cross country	Soccer
Cheerleading	Softball
Field hockey	Swimming
Golf	Tennis
Lacrosse	Volleyball

The Lions won state titles in:

- Basketball (6) (2002, 2003, 2011, 2012, 2013, 2014)
- Swimming (3) (2001, 2002, 2008)
- Tennis (1) (2000)
