= Villa Maria Academy (Malvern, Pennsylvania) =

Private school in Malvern, Pennsylvania, United States

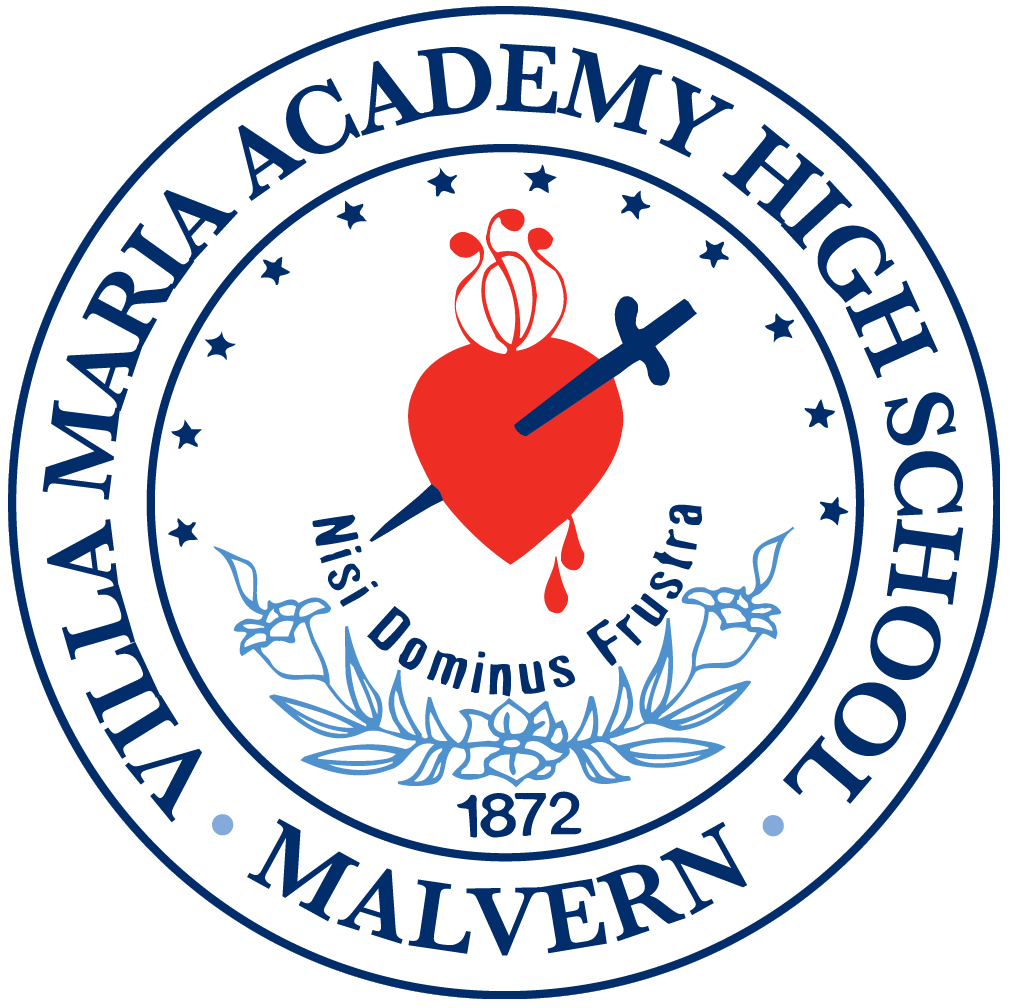

Location
- 370 Central Avenue; Malvern, (Chester County), Pennsylvania 19355; United States; 40°2′25″N 75°30′26″W

Information
- Type: Private
- Motto: Nisi Dominus Frustra (Without God, all is in vain. Or With God, nothing is in vain.)
- Religious affiliation: Roman Catholic
- Established: 1872
- Oversight: Sisters, Servants of the Immaculate Heart of Mary
- CEEB code: 392375
- Principal: Dr. Jane Hannon
- Staff: 62
- Grades: 9-12
- Gender: Girls
  - Grade 9: 104
  - Grade 10: 110
  - Grade 11: 106
  - Grade 12: 104
- Average class size: 14
- Student to teacher ratio: 10:1
- Campus: Suburban
- Campus size: 45 acres (180,000 m^{2})
- Colors: White and Blue
- Slogan: Nisi Dominus Frustra
- Athletics conference: AACA, PIAA District 1
- Mascot: Hurricanes
- Team name: Hurricanes
- Accreditation: Middle States Association of Colleges and Schools Pennsylvania Association of Independent Schools (PAIS)
- Publication: Festival (literary magazine)
- Newspaper: The Villa Voice
- Yearbook: Reflections
- Tuition: $29,000
- Website: www.vmahs.org

Villa Maria Academy is an all-girls Catholic college-preparatory high school located in Malvern, Pennsylvania. The school was founded and carried out by the Sisters, Servants of the Immaculate Heart of Mary. It is operated independently and with the blessing of the Roman Catholic Archdiocese of Philadelphia.

== Founding and early history ==
The foundation of the academy dates to July, 1872. At that time, the Sisters, Servants of the Immaculate Heart of Mary transferred their motherhouse, novitiate, and boarding school from Reading to West Chester, PA. Occupying the property formerly owned by the Pennsylvania Military Academy, the school flourished in West Chester until 1914, when Villa Maria moved to the site of Immaculata College, in Frazer, Pa.

In 1924, the Sisters acquired the property of William R. Warner, Jr. in Green Tree (Malvern), where the high school remains today. May 5, 1925 marked the opening of Villa Maria at Green Tree. Regina Mundi Hall was constructed in 1955, and had many later additions and expansions.

In 1979, Villa Maria Lower School, grades K-8, was moved to a wing of the House of Studies at Immaculata. At this time the high school acquired St. Joseph Hall, which had been built in 1965. In 1985, plans were undertaken to build the Marian Center, an Arts/Athletic complex. The Athletic Center, Phase 1 of the total project, opened in December, 1987. Phase Two was completed in May, 1997; new soccer/lacrosse, softball, and hockey fields, an all-weather track, and five tennis courts were also constructed. In the early 2000s, other renovations and expansions were completed, which included an addition to St. Joseph's Hall, renovation of the cafeteria in Regina Mundi, and campus security measures.

== Campus ==
Villa Maria's 44-acre (180,000 m^{2}) campus includes two academic buildings (Regina Mundi and St. Joseph's Hall), another building with the gymnasium, fitness center, and, the Villa Maria Conservatory, and a connected auditorium (Marian Center), a convent, and the Theresa Maxis Student Union, opened in summer, 2022. The student union houses the Holloway Dining Hall, Parsons Chapel, counseling, nursing, activities, and administrative offices. In 2015, the Maurene Polley turf field was built in honor of the legacy of the former field hockey coach of 43 years, National Field Hockey Coaches Hall of Fame, and athletics director.

Villa Maria is a relatively small school, with a staff of 62 (including both religious and laypeople) and 400-450 students. It offers college-prep, honors, and Advanced Placement (AP) courses, beyond the classroom experiences, scholarships, a Scholars Program, and a Senior Capstone Program.

== Notable alumnae ==
- Mary Pat Christie (1981), former First Lady of New Jersey and wife of Governor Chris Christie, former Vice President at Cantor Fitzgerald
- Megan Griffith (2003), college basketball coach
