= Ivy League Digital Network =

- Website type: Sports broadcasting
- Owner: Council of Ivy Group Presidents
- Website: ivyleaguedigitalnetwork.com
- Launched: 28 June 2013; 13 years ago
- Current status: Discontinued July 12, 2018

Ivy League Digital Network was an Internet television website operated by the Ivy League. The internet network was first available to subscribers in fall 2013, and covered all eight of the Ivy League universities. The site used technology provided by NeuLion to feature live and on-demand content from a variety of sports across the eight schools and conference championship events. On April 4, 2018, it was announced that the Ivy League and ESPN agreed to have the ESPN platform carry Ivy League athletic competitions. Under the ten-year deal, over 1,100 Ivy League events per year across 30 sports will be covered, including certain premier Ivy League events (e.g., the Harvard-Yale football game) which will air on its Linear Networks, but with the majority of sports and events being carried on ESPN+, its new direct-to-consumer streaming service that was launched on April 12, 2018. On July 12, 2018, the Ivy League Digital Network announced that their website would no longer provide services, all users' subscriptions would be automatically cancelled, and users should purchase a subscription to ESPN+ to continue to watch Ivy League athletic competitions.

== Programming ==
- Baseball
- Basketball (Men's and Women's)
- Cross Country
- Field Hockey
- Football
- Golf (Men's and Women's)
- Women's Gymnastics
- Ice Hockey (Men's and Women's)
- Indoor T&F
- Lacrosse (Men's and Women's)
- Outdoor T&F
- Rowing (Men's and Women's)
- Women's Rugby
- Soccer (Men's and Women's)
- Softball
- Sprint Football
- Squash (Men's and Women's)
- Swimming/Diving (Men's and Women's)
- Tennis (Men's and Women's)
- Volleyball (Men's and Women's)
- Water-polo (Men's and Women's)
- Wrestling
