= NCAA Division I women's basketball tournament bids by school =

This is a list of NCAA Division I women's basketball tournament bids by school, at the conclusion of the 2026 conference tournaments. Schools whose names are italicized are no longer in Division I and can no longer be included in the tournament. The 2020 NCAA Division I women's basketball tournament was never played due to the COVID-19 pandemic.

The next tournament in 2027 will be the first with a total of 76 possible bids—32 automatic qualifiers and 44 at-large. This follows five seasons with a 68-team field, featuring 32 automatic qualifiers from 2022–2024 and 31 in 2025 and 2026. The temporary reduction in automatic bids stemmed from the 2024 collapse of the Pac-12 Conference, which was left with only two members until the arrival of seven new members in 2026.

Vacated appearances are not included in the totals.

The table is current through the 2026 NCAA Division I women's basketball tournament. Conference affiliations reflect those in the upcoming 2026–27 season.

== Bids ==
(#) – Vacated appearance

Bids	School	Conference	Last...							
Bids	School	Conference	Years	Bid	Win	Sweet 16	Elite 8	Final 4	Final	Title (No.)
44	Tennessee	SEC	1982–2019, 2021–26	2026	2025	2025	2016	2008	2008	2008 (8)
38	Texas	SEC	1983–94, 1996–97, 1999–2005, 2008–12, 2014–19, 2021–26	2026	2026	2026	2026	2026	1986	1986 (1)
37	Georgia	SEC	1982–91, 1993, 1995–2014, 2016, 2018, 2021–23, 2026	2026	2023	2013	2013	1999	1996	
37	Stanford	ACC	1982, 1988–2019, 2021–24	2024	2024	2024	2022	2022	2021	2021 (3)
37 (Note: Received an automatic bid in 2020 for winning its conference tournament but is not reflected in the totals when the NCAA cancelled the 2020 Tournament due to the COVID-19 pandemic.)	UConn	Big East	1989–2019, 2021–26	2026	2026	2026	2026	2026	2025	2025 (12)
33	Maryland	Big Ten	1982–84, 1986, 1988–93, 1997, 2001, 2004–09, 2011–19, 2021–26	2026	2026	2025	2023	2015	2006	2006 (1)
33	North Carolina	ACC	1983–87, 1992–95, 1997–2000, 2002–11, 2013–15, 2019, 2021–26	2026	2026	2026	2014	2007	1994	1994 (1)
32	Iowa	Big Ten	1986–94, 1996–98, 2001–02, 2004, 2006, 2008–15, 2018–19, 2021–26	2026	2026	2024	2024	2024	2024	
31	LSU	SEC	1984, 1986–91, 1997, 1999–2010, 2012–15, 2017–18, 2022–26	2026	2026	2026	2025	2023	2023	2023 (1)
31	NC State	ACC	1982–87, 1989–91, 1995–2001, 2004–07, 2010, 2014, 2017–19, 2021–26	2026	2026	2025	2024	2024		
31	Notre Dame	ACC	1992, 1994, 1996–2019, 2022–26	2026	2026	2026	2026	2019	2019	2018 (2)
30	Vanderbilt	SEC	1986–87, 1989–98, 2000–14, 2024-26	2026	2026	2026	2002	1993		
28	Duke	ACC	1987, 1995–2015, 2017–18, 2023–26	2026	2026	2026	2026	2006	2006	
28	Louisville	ACC	1983–84, 1993, 1995, 1997–99, 2001, 2005–09, 2011–19, 2021–26	2026	2026	2026	2023	2022	2013	
28 #	Ohio State	Big Ten	1982, 1984–90, 1993, 1996, 1999, 2003–12, 2015–16, 2022–26	2026	2026	2023	2023	1993	1993	
27	Louisiana Tech	Sun Belt	1982–2006, 2010–11	2011	2004	2004	2001	1999	1998	1988 (2)
27	Purdue	Big Ten	1989–92, 1995–2009, 2011–14, 2016–17, 2023	2023	2017	2009	2009	2001	2001	1999 (1)
26	Oklahoma	SEC	1986, 1995, 2000–18, 2022–26	2026	2026	2026	2010	2010	2002	
26	Rutgers	Big Ten	1986–94, 1998–2001, 2003–12, 2015, 2019, 2021	2021	2015	2009	2008	2007	2007	
26	Virginia	ACC	1984–2003, 2005, 2008–10, 2018, 2026	2026	2026	2026	1996	1992	1991	
25	DePaul	Big East	1990–93, 1995–97, 2003–19, 2022	2022	2018	2016				
25	Old Dominion	Sun Belt	1982–85, 1987–90, 1992–2008	2008	2008	2008	2002	1997	1997	1985 (1)
25	Penn State	Big Ten	1982–88, 1990–96, 1999–2005, 2011–14	2014	2014	2014	2004	2000		
24	Baylor	Big 12	2001–02, 2004–19, 2021–26	2026	2026	2024	2021	2019	2019	2019 (3)
24	Iowa State	Big 12	1997–2002, 2005, 2007–15, 2017, 2019, 2021–26	2026	2024	2022	2009			
23	Florida State	ACC	1983, 1990–91, 2001, 2005–11, 2013–19, 2021–25	2025	2025	2017	2017			
22	Auburn	SEC	1982–83, 1985–91, 1993–94, 1996–97, 1999–2000, 2004, 2008–09, 2016–17, 2019, 2024	2024	2016	1996	1996	1990	1990	
22	Ole Miss	SEC	1982–92, 1994–96, 2004–05, 2007, 2022–26	2026	2026	2025	2007			
22	South Carolina	SEC	1982, 1986, 1988–91, 2002–03, 2012–19, 2021–26	2026	2026	2026	2026	2026	2026	2024 (3)
22	Stephen F. Austin	Southland	1982–83, 1988–2002, 2006, 2021–22, 2025-26	2026	2000	1996				
21	Green Bay	Horizon	1994, 1998–2000, 2002–05, 2007, 2009–13, 2015–18, 2024-26	2026	2012	2011				
21	Michigan State	Big Ten	1991, 1996–97, 2003–07, 2009–14, 2016–17, 2019, 2021, 2024-26	2026	2026	2009	2005	2005	2005	
21	Middle Tennessee	CUSA	1983–86, 1988, 1996, 1998, 2004–07, 2009–14, 2016, 2021, 2023–24	2024	2024					
21	Montana	Big Sky	1983–84, 1986, 1988–92, 1994–98, 2000, 2004–05, 2008–09, 2011, 2013, 2015	2015	1995	1986				
21	Texas Tech	Big 12	1984, 1986, 1990–2005, 2011, 2013, 2026	2026	2026	2005	2003	1993	1993	1993 (1)
21	UCLA	Big Ten	1983, 1985, 1990, 1992, 1998–2000, 2004, 2006, 2010–11, 2013, 2016–19, 2021, 2023–26	2026	2026	2026	2026	2026	2026	2026 (1)
21	Utah	Big 12	1983, 1986, 1989–91, 1995–98, 2000–01, 2003, 2005–06, 2008–09, 2011, 2022–25	2025	2024	2023	2006			
21	Washington	Big Ten	1985–91, 1993–95, 1997–98, 2001, 2003, 2006–07, 2015–17, 2025-26	2026	2026	2017	2016	2016		
20	USC	Big Ten	1982–88, 1991–95, 1997, 2005–06, 2014, 2023–26	2026	2026	2025	2025	1986	1986	1984 (2)
20	Western Kentucky	CUSA	1985–95, 1997–98, 2000, 2003, 2008, 2014–15, 2017–18	2018	2000	1995	1992	1992	1992	
19	Kansas State	Big 12	1982–84, 1987, 1997, 2002–05, 2008–09, 2011, 2012, 2016–17, 2019, 2022, 2024-25	2025	2025	2025	1982			
19	Kentucky	SEC	1982–83, 1986, 1991, 1999, 2006, 2010–17, 2019, 2021–22, 2025-26	2026	2026	2026	2013			
19	Oklahoma State	Big 12	1989–91, 1993–96, 2007–08, 2010, 2013–16, 2018, 2021, 2023, 2025-26	2026	2026	2014				
19	Oregon	Big Ten	1982, 1984, 1987, 1994–2001, 2005, 2017–19, 2021–22, 2025-26	2026	2026	2021	2019	2019		
18	Arizona State	Big 12	1982–83, 1992, 2001–02, 2005–09, 2011, 2014–19, 2026	2026	2019	2019	2009			
18	George Washington	Atlantic 10	1991–92, 1994–98, 2000–01, 2003–08, 2015–16, 2017–18	2018	2008	2008	1997			
18	Liberty	CUSA	1997–2006, 2008–10, 2012–13, 2015, 2018, 2025	2025	2005	2005				
18	Missouri State	CUSA	1991–96, 1998–2001, 2003–04, 2006, 2016, 2019, 2021–22, 2026	2026	2022	2021	2001	2001		
18	Nebraska	Big Ten	1988, 1993, 1996, 1998–2000, 2007–08, 2010, 2012–15, 2018, 2022, 2024-26	2026	2024	2013				
18	Texas A&M	SEC	1994, 1996, 2006–19, 2021, 2024	2024	2021	2021	2014	2011	2011	2011 (1)
17	Chattanooga	Southern	1989, 1992, 2001–04, 2006–08, 2010, 2013–17, 2023–24	2024	2004					
17	Clemson	ACC	1982, 1988–94, 1996–2002, 2019, 2026	2026	2019	1999	1991			
17	Colorado	Big 12	1988–89, 1992–97, 2001–04, 2013, 2022–24, 2026	2026	2024	2024	2002			
17	West Virginia	Big 12	1989, 1992, 2004, 2007–08, 2010–14, 2016–17, 2021, 2023–26	2026	2026	1992				
16	Florida	SEC	1993–99, 2001–02, 2004, 2006, 2009, 2012, 2014, 2016, 2022	2022	2014	1998	1997			
16	Gonzaga	Pac-12	2007, 2009–15, 2017–19, 2021–24, 2026	2026	2024	2024	2011			
16	Miami (FL)	ACC	1989, 1992–93, 1998, 2003–04, 2011–13, 2015–19, 2022–23	2023	2023	2023	2023			
15	Alabama	SEC	1984, 1988, 1992–99, 2021, 2023–26	2026	2026	1998	1994	1994		
15	BYU	Big 12	1984–85, 1993, 2000, 2002–03, 2006–07, 2012, 2014–16, 2019, 2021–22	2022	2021	2014				
15	California	ACC	1990, 1992–93, 2006–09, 2012–15, 2017–19, 2025	2025	2019	2013	2013	2013		
15	Drake	Missouri Valley	1982, 1984, 1986, 1995, 1997–98, 2000–02, 2007, 2017–19, 2023–24	2024	2002	2002	1982			
15	Holy Cross	Patriot	1985, 1989, 1991, 1995–96, 1998–2001, 2003, 2005, 2007, 2023–24, 2026	2026	1991					
15	Kansas	Big 12	1987–88, 1992–2000, 2012–13, 2022, 2024	2024	2024	2013				
15	Marquette	Big East	1994–95, 1997–2000, 2004, 2007, 2011, 2017–19, 2021, 2023–24	2024	2019					
14	James Madison	Sun Belt	1986–89, 1991, 1996, 2007, 2010–11, 2014–16, 2023, 2026	2026	2014	1991				
14	Michigan	Big Ten	1990, 1998, 2000–01, 2012–13, 2018–19, 2021–26	2026	2026	2026	2026			
14	Oregon State	Pac-12	1983–84, 1994–96, 2014–19, 2021, 2024-25	2025	2024	2024	2024	2016		
14	South Dakota State	Summit	2009–13, 2015–16, 2018–19, 2021, 2023–26	2026	2025	2019				
14	Syracuse	ACC	1985, 1988, 2002, 2008, 2013–19, 2021, 2024, 2026	2026	2026	2016	2016	2016	2016	
14	UC Santa Barbara	Big West	1992–93, 1997–2005, 2008–09, 2012	2012	2004	2004				
14	Villanova	Big East	1986–89, 2001–04, 2009, 2013, 2018, 2022–23, 2026	2026	2023	2023	2003			
14	Virginia Tech	ACC	1994–95, 1998–99, 2001, 2003–06, 2021–24, 2026	2026	2024	2023	2023	2023		
13	Arkansas	SEC	1986, 1989–91, 1995, 1998, 2001–03, 2012, 2015, 2021–22	2022	2015	1998	1998	1998		
13	Mississippi State	SEC	1999–2000, 2002–03, 2009–10, 2015–19, 2023, 2025	2025	2025	2019	2019	2018	2018	
13	Missouri	SEC	1982–86, 1994, 2001, 2004, 2006, 2016–19	2019	2019	2001				
13 (Note: Was awarded the 2020 conference championship when the conference tournament was cancelled due to the COVID-19 pandemic, prior to the NCAA cancelling the 2020 NCAA Division I women's basketball tournament. It has not been reflected in the totals.)	Princeton	Ivy	2010–13, 2015–16, 2018–19, 2022–26	2026	2023					
13	Saint Joseph's	Atlantic 10	1985–90, 1994–95, 1997, 1999–2000, 2013–14	2014	2014					
12	Georgia Tech	ACC	1993, 2003, 2007–12, 2014, 2021–22, 2025	2025	2021	2021				
12	Long Beach State	Big West	1982–92, 2017	2017	1991	1991	1989	1988		
12	Saint Francis (PA)	Presidents' (D-III)	1996–2000, 2002–05, 2010–11, 2018	2018						
12	Tennessee Tech	Southern	1982, 1985, 1987, 1989–93, 1999–2000, 2023, 2025	2025	1990					
11	Arizona	Big 12	1997–2000, 2003–05, 2021–24	2024	2023	2021	2021	2021	2021	
11	Bowling Green	Mid-American	1987–90, 1993–94, 2005–07, 2010–11	2011	2007	2007				
11	Creighton	Big East	1992, 1994, 2002, 2012–13, 2017–18, 2022–25	2025	2024	2022	2022			
11	Florida Gulf Coast	ASUN	2012, 2014–15, 2017–19, 2021–25	2025	2023					
11	Illinois	Big Ten	1982, 1986–87, 1997–2000, 2003, 2023, 2025-26	2026	2026	1997				
11	Indiana	Big Ten	1983, 1994–95, 2002, 2016, 2019, 2021–25	2025	2025	2024	2021			
11	Marist	Metro	2004, 2006–14, 2021	2021	2012	2007				
11	Minnesota	Big Ten	1994, 2002–06, 2008–09, 2015, 2018, 2026	2026	2026	2026	2004	2004		
11	St. John's	Big East	1983–84, 1988, 2006, 2010–14, 2016, 2023	2023	2014	2012				
11	TCU	Big 12	2001–07, 2009–10, 2025-26	2026	2026	2026	2026			
11	Temple	American	1989, 2002, 2004–11, 2017	2017	2011					
11	Tulane	American	1995–2003, 2010, 2015	2015	2002					
11	UNLV	Mountain West	1984–86, 1989–91, 1994, 2002, 2022–24	2024	1991	1989				
10	Maine	America East	1995–2000, 2004, 2018–19, 2024	2024	1999					
10	San Diego State	Pac-12	1984–85, 1993–95, 1997, 2009–10, 2012, 2025	2025	2010	2010				
10	South Florida	American	2006, 2013, 2015–18, 2021–23, 2025	2025	2023					
10	Xavier	Big East	1993, 1999–2001, 2003, 2007–11	2011	2011	2010	2010			
9	Dayton	Atlantic 10	2010–15, 2017–18, 2022	2022	2022	2015	2015			
9	Hampton	CAA	2000, 2003–04, 2010–14, 2017	2017						
9	Toledo	Mid-American	1991–92, 1995–97, 1999, 2001, 2017, 2023	2023	2023					
9	Vermont	America East	1992–94, 2000, 2009–10, 2023, 2025-26	2026	2010					
8	Fairfield	Metro	1988, 1991, 1998, 2001, 2022, 2024-26	2026						
8	Hawaiʻi	Mountain West	1989–90, 1994, 1996, 1998, 2016, 2022–23	2023	1990					
8	New Mexico	Mountain West	1998, 2002–08	2008	2006	2003				
8	Northwestern	Big Ten	1982, 1987, 1990–91, 1993, 1997, 2015, 2021	2021	2021					
8	Southern Mississippi	Sun Belt	1985, 1987, 1989–90, 1992, 1994–96	1996	1996	1994				
7	Albany	America East	2012–17, 2022	2022	2016					
7	Austin Peay	United	1996, 2001–04, 2009–10	2010						
7	Belmont	Missouri Valley	2007, 2016–19, 2021–22	2022	2022					
7	Boston College	ACC	1999–2000, 2002–06	2006	2006	2006				
7	Colorado State	Pac-12	1996, 1998–99, 2001–02, 2016, 2026	2026	2001	1999				
7	Dartmouth	Ivy	1983, 1995, 1999–2000, 2005–06, 2009	2009						
7	Fresno State	Pac-12	2008–14	2014						
7	Harvard	Ivy	1996–98, 2002–03, 2007, 2025	2025	1998					
7	Howard	MEAC	1982, 1996–98, 2001, 2022, 2026	2026	2022					
7	Jackson State	SWAC	1982–83, 1995, 2008, 2021–22, 2024	2024						
7	Saint Peter's	Metro	1982, 1992–93, 1997, 1999–2000, 2002	2002						
7	SMU	ACC	1994–96, 1998–2000, 2008	2008	2000					
7 #	Southern (Note: Southern vacated its participation in the 2010 tournament.)	SWAC	2002, 2004, 2006, 2010, 2019, 2023, 2025-26	2026						
7	UCF	Big 12	1996, 1999, 2009, 2011, 2019, 2021–22	2022	2022					
7	Wisconsin	Big Ten	1992, 1995–96, 1998, 2001–02, 2010	2010	1996					
6	Boise State	Pac-12	1994, 2007, 2015, 2017–19	2019						
6	Central Michigan	Mid-American	1983–84, 2013, 2018–19, 2021	2021	2018	2018				
6	FIU	CUSA	1994–95, 1997–99, 2002	2002	2002					
6	Grambling	SWAC	1994, 1996–99, 2018	2018						
6	Hartford	Conference of New England (D-III)	2002, 2005–06, 2008, 2010–11	2011	2008					
6	Illinois State	Missouri Valley	1983, 1985, 1989, 2005, 2008, 2022	2022	1989					
6	Kent State	Mid-American	1982, 1996, 1998, 2000, 2002, 2024	2024	1996					
6	Little Rock	United	2010–12, 2015, 2018–19	2019	2015					
6 #	Memphis (Note: Memphis, then known as Memphis State University, vacated its participation in the 1985 tournament.)	American	1982, 1985, 1987, 1995–98	1998	1995	1982				
6	New Mexico State	CUSA	1987–88, 2015–17, 2019	2019						
6	Oral Roberts	Summit	1999, 2001, 2005, 2007–08, 2013	2013						
6	Portland	WCC	1994–97, 2023–24	2024						
6	Prairie View A&M	SWAC	2007, 2009, 2011–14	2014						
6	Richmond	Atlantic 10	1990–91, 2005, 2024-26	2026	2025					
6	Robert Morris	Horizon	2007–08, 2014, 2016–17, 2019	2019						
6	Santa Clara	WCC	1992, 1994, 1998–99, 2002, 2005	2005	1992					
5	Delaware	CUSA	2001, 2007, 2012–13, 2022	2022	2013	2013				
5	Houston	Big 12	1988, 1992, 2004–05, 2011	2011	2004					
5	Idaho	Big Sky	1985, 2013–14, 2016, 2026	2026						
5	Lehigh	Patriot	1997, 2009–10, 2021, 2025	2025						
5	North Carolina A&T	CAA	1994, 2009, 2016, 2018, 2021	2021						
5	Northern Illinois	Horizon	1990, 1992–95	1995	1992					
5	Penn	Ivy	2001, 2004, 2014, 2016–17	2017						
5	Providence	Big East	1986, 1989–92	1992	1991	1990				
5	Quinnipiac	Metro	2013, 2015, 2017–19	2019	2018	2017				
5	Sacred Heart	Metro	2006, 2009, 2012, 2023–24	2024						
5 (Note: Received the 2024 Ohio Valley Conference women's basketball tournament automatic bid because tournament champion Southern Indiana was ineligible due to its transition from Division II to Division I.)	Tennessee–Martin	Ohio Valley	2011–14, 2024	2024						
4	Appalachian State	Sun Belt	1990–91, 1996, 1999	1999						
4	Bucknell	Patriot	2002, 2008, 2017, 2019	2019						
4	Buffalo	Mid-American	2016, 2018–19, 2022	2022	2019	2018				
4	Cal State Northridge	Big West	1999, 2014–15, 2018	2018						
4	Cincinnati	Big 12	1989, 1999, 2002–03	2003	2002					
4	Georgetown	Big East	1993, 2010–12	2012	2012	2011				
4	Idaho State	Big Sky	2001, 2007, 2012, 2021	2021						
4	La Salle	Atlantic 10	1983, 1986, 1988–89	1989	1989					
4	Louisiana-Monroe	Sun Belt	1983–85, 1987	1987	1985	1985	1985	1985		
4	Manhattan	Metro	1987, 1990, 1996, 2003	2003						
4	Mercer	Southern	2018–19, 2021–22	2022						
4	Montana State	Big Sky	1993, 2017, 2022, 2025	2025						
4	Mount St. Mary's	Metro	1994–95, 2021–22	2022						
4	Norfolk State	MEAC	2002, 2023–25	2025						
4	Northwestern State	Southland	1989, 2004, 2014–15	2015						
4	Pepperdine	WCC	2000, 2002–03, 2006	2006						
4	Pittsburgh	ACC	2007–09, 2015	2015	2015	2009				
4	Radford	Big South	1994–96, 2019	2019						
4	Rice	American	2000, 2005, 2019, 2024	2024	2000					
4	San Francisco	WCC	1995–97, 2016	2016	1996	1996				
4	Seton Hall	Big East	1994–95, 2015–16	2016	1995	1994				
4	South Dakota	Summit	2014, 2019, 2021–22	2022	2022	2022				
4	Southern Illinois	Missouri Valley	1986–87, 1990, 1992	1992	1992	1987				
4	Troy	Sun Belt	1997, 2016–17, 2021	2021						
4	Washington State	Pac-12	1991, 2021–23	2023						
3	Alabama State	SWAC	2003, 2015–16	2016						
3	Alcorn State	SWAC	2000–01, 2005	2005						
3	American	Patriot	2015, 2018, 2022	2022						
3	Army	Patriot	2006, 2014, 2016	2016						
3	Charlotte	American	2003, 2009, 2022	2022						
3	Cheyney	Independent (No affiliation)	1982–84	1984	1984	1984	1984	1982	1982	
3	Cleveland State	Horizon	2008, 2010, 2023	2023						
3	Coppin State	MEAC	2005–06, 2008	2008						
3	Drexel	CAA	2009, 2021, 2024	2024						
3	East Carolina	American	1982, 2007, 2023	2023						
3	East Tennessee State	Southern	2008–10	2010						
3	Fordham	Atlantic 10	1994, 2014, 2019	2019						
3	Georgia State	Sun Belt	2001–03	2003						
3	High Point	Big South	2021, 2025-26	2026						
3	Massachusetts	Mid-American	1996, 1998, 2022	2022						
3	Murray State	Missouri Valley	2008, 2025-26	2026						
3	Navy	Patriot	2011–13	2013						
3	Northern Iowa	Missouri Valley	2010–11, 2017	2017						
3	Ohio	Mid-American	1986, 1995, 2015	2015						
3	Samford	Southern	2011–12, 2026	2026						
3	San Diego	WCC	1993, 2000, 2008	2008						
3	Stetson	ASUN	2005, 2011, 2013	2013						
3	Tennessee State	Ohio Valley	1994–95, 2015	2015						
3	UC Davis	Mountain West	2011, 2019, 2021	2021						
3	UC Riverside	Big West	2006–07, 2010	2010						
3	UNC Asheville	Big South	2007, 2016–17	2017						
3	UT Arlington	United	2005, 2007, 2022	2022						
3	UTSA	American	2008–09, 2026	2026						
3	Western Illinois	Ohio Valley	1995, 2017, 2026	2026						
3	Wichita State	American	2013–15	2015						
3	Wright State	Horizon	2014, 2019, 2021	2021	2021					
3	Youngstown State	Horizon	1996, 1998, 2000	2000	1998					
2	Ball State	Mid-American	2009, 2025	2025	2009					
2	Cal State Fullerton	Big West	1989, 1991	1991	1991					
2 (Note: California Baptist won the 2021 WAC women's basketball tournament final but was ineligible because it was still within its transition period from Division II to Division I athletics.)	California Baptist	Big West	2024, 2026	2026						
2	Central Arkansas	United	2016–17	2017						
2	Columbia	Ivy	2024-25	2025						
2	Eastern Kentucky	United	1997, 2005	2005						
2	Eastern Michigan	Mid-American	2004, 2012	2012						
2	Eastern Washington	Big Sky	1987, 2024	2024						
2	Elon	CAA	2017–18	2018						
2	Evansville	Missouri Valley	1999, 2009	2009						
2	Fairleigh Dickinson	NEC	2025-26	2026						
2	Florida A&M	SWAC	1995, 1999	1999						
2	Furman	Southern	1995, 2000	2000						
2	Gardner–Webb	Big South	2011, 2023	2023						
2	Georgia Southern	Sun Belt	1993–94	1994						
2	Iona	Metro	2016, 2023	2023						
2	Jacksonville	ASUN	2016, 2026	2026						
2	Lamar	Southland	1991, 2010	2010	1991	1991	1991			
2	Loyola (MD)	Patriot	1994–95	1995						
2	Marshall	Sun Belt	1997, 2024	2024						
2	McNeese	Southland	2011–12	2012						
2	Miami (OH)	Mid-American	2008, 2026	2026						
2	Milwaukee	Horizon	2001, 2006	2006						
2	Monmouth	CAA	1983, 2023	2023	1983					
2	Oakland	Horizon	2002, 2006	2006						
2	Portland State	Big Sky	2010, 2019	2019						
2	Rhode Island	Atlantic 10	1996, 2026	2026						
2	Saint Mary's	WCC	1999, 2001	2001	2001					
2	Southeast Missouri State	Ohio Valley	2006–07	2007						
2	St. Bonaventure	Atlantic 10	2012, 2016	2016	2016	2012				
2	Texas State	Pac-12	1997, 2003	2003						
2	Tulsa	American	2006, 2013	2013	2006					
2	UAB	American	1994, 2000	2000	2000	2000				
2	UC Irvine	Big West	1995, 2024	2024						
2	UC San Diego	Big West	2025-26	2026						
2	UNC Greensboro	Southern	1998, 2025	2025						
2	UTEP	Mountain West	2008, 2012	2012	2008					
2	Valparaiso	Missouri Valley	2003–04	2004						
2	VCU	Atlantic 10	2009, 2021	2021						
2	Wake Forest	ACC	1988, 2021	2021	1988					
2	Weber State	Big Sky	2002–03	2003						
2	Western Carolina	Southern	2005, 2009	2009						
2	Western Michigan	Mid-American	1985, 2003	2003						
2	Wyoming	Mountain West	2008, 2021	2021						
1	Abilene Christian	United	2019	2019						
1	Akron	Mid-American	2014	2014						
1	Arkansas State	Sun Belt	2025	2025						
1	Bethune–Cookman	SWAC	2019	2019						
1	Boston University	Patriot	2003	2003						
1	Bradley	Missouri Valley	2021	2021						
1	Brown	Ivy	1994	1994						
1	Butler	Big East	1996	1996						
1	Cal Poly	Big West	2013	2013						
1	Campbell	CAA	2000	2000						
1	Canisius	Metro	2005	2005						
1	Charleston	CAA	2026	2026						
1	Colgate	Patriot	2004	2004						
1	Cornell	Ivy	2008	2008						
1	Delaware State	MEAC	2007	2007						
1	Denver	WCC	2001	2001						
1	Detroit Mercy	Horizon	1997	1997						
1	Duquesne	Atlantic 10	2016	2016	2016					
1	Eastern Illinois	Ohio Valley	1988	1988						
1	Florida Atlantic	American	2006	2006						
1	George Mason	Atlantic 10	2025	2025						
1	Grand Canyon	Mountain West	2025	2025						
1	Incarnate Word	Southland	2022	2022						
1	IU Indy (Note: Competed as IUPUI, which was dissolved after the 2023–24 academic year and replaced by separate institutions affiliated with the Indiana University and Purdue University systems. The athletic program transferred to the new IU Indianapolis.)	Horizon	2022	2022						
1	Lipscomb	ASUN	2004	2004						
1	LIU (Note: LIU's only tournament bid to date was claimed by the team representing Long Island University's Brooklyn campus. At the time, the university operated two athletic programs, with the other being the Division II program of its Post campus. After the 2018–19 school year, LIU merged its two athletic programs. The unified program inherited the athletic history of the Brooklyn campus, as well as Brooklyn's memberships in Division I and the Northeast Conference (now officially NEC).)	NEC	2001	2001						
1	Longwood	Big South	2022	2022	2022					
1	Louisiana	Sun Belt	2007	2007						
1	Loyola Marymount	WCC	2004	2004						
1	LSU New Orleans (Note: Competed as New Orleans; the university was known as the University of New Orleans from 1974–2026. After the 2025–26 academic year, the university rejoined the Louisiana State University System and adopted its current name of LSU New Orleans.)	Southland	1987	1987						
1	Nicholls	Southland	2018	2018						
1	North Dakota	Summit	2014	2014						
1	North Texas	American	1986	1986						
1	Northeastern	CAA	1999	1999						
1	Northern Arizona	Big Sky	2006	2006						
1	Northern Colorado	Big Sky	2018	2018						
1	Presbyterian	Big South	2024	2024						
1	Sacramento State	Big West	2023	2023						
1	Saint Louis	Atlantic 10	2023	2023						
1	Savannah State	SIAC (D-II)	2015	2015						
1	Seattle	WCC	2018	2018						
1	Siena	Metro	2001	2001						
1	South Alabama	Sun Belt	1987	1987						
1	South Carolina St.	MEAC	1983	1983	1983					
1	Southern Utah	Big Sky	2023	2023						
1	Southeastern Louisiana	Southland	2023	2023						
1	St. Francis Brooklyn	None (Note: St. Francis College shut down its entire athletic program after the 2022–23 season.)	2015	2015						
1	Stony Brook	CAA	2021	2021						
1	Texas A&M-Corpus Christi	Southland	2024	2024						
1	Texas Southern	SWAC	2017	2017						
1	Towson	CAA	2019	2019						
1	UMBC	America East	2007	2007						
1 (Note: Received the automatic bid as conference regular season runner-up in 2021 when California Baptist defeated Grand Canyon in the 2021 WAC women's basketball tournament final but was ineligible because Cal Baptist was still within its transition period from Division II to Division I athletics.)	Utah Valley	Big West	2021	2021						
1	William & Mary	CAA	2025	2025						
1	Winthrop	Big South	2014	2014						

== Schools vacating NCAA tournament appearances ==
Three schools have vacated NCAA Tournament appearances in women's basketball.

School	Year(s)
Memphis	1985
Southern	2010
Ohio State	2017, 2018

== Schools yet to receive bids ==
There are 62 schools that have never reached the NCAA Division I Tournament. Conference affiliations are current for 2026–27.

School	Current conference	First season	Notes
Air Force	Mountain West Conference	1996–97	
Alabama A&M	Southwestern Athletic Conference	1998–99	
Arkansas-Pine Bluff	Southwestern Athletic Conference	1996–97	
Bellarmine	Atlantic Sun Conference	2020–21	
Binghamton	America East Conference	1999–2000	
Bryant	America East Conference	2008–09	
Cal State Bakersfield	Big West Conference	2013–14	
Central Connecticut	NEC	1986–87	
Chicago State	NEC	1984-85	
Charleston Southern	Big South Conference	1976–77	
Coastal Carolina	Sun Belt Conference	1974–75	
Davidson	Atlantic 10 Conference	1973–74	
East Texas A&M	Southland Conference	2022–23	Changed its name from Texas A&M–Commerce early in the 2024–25 season.
Hofstra	Coastal Athletic Association	1973–74	
Houston Christian	Southland Conference	1999–2000	Changed its name from Houston Baptist shortly before the 2022–23 season.
Indiana State	Missouri Valley Conference	1971–72	
Jacksonville State	Conference USA	1993–94	
Kansas City (Note: Was awarded the conference championship when the conference tournament was canceled due to the COVID-19 pandemic, prior to the NCAA cancelling the 2020 NCAA Division I women's basketball tournament.)	Summit League	1994–95	
Kennesaw State	Conference USA	2005–06	
Lafayette	Patriot League	1972–73	
Le Moyne	NEC	2023–24	Eligible for an NCAA tournament bid for the first time in 2027.
Loyola Chicago	Atlantic 10 Conference	1979–80	
Lindenwood	Ohio Valley Conference	2022–23	
Maryland Eastern Shore	Mid-Eastern Athletic Conference	1981–82	
Mercyhurst	NEC	2024–25	Eligible for an NCAA tournament bid for the first time in 2028.
Merrimack	Metro Conference	2019–20	
Mississippi Valley State	Southwestern Athletic Conference	1981–82	
Morehead State	Ohio Valley Conference	1970–71	
Morgan State	Mid-Eastern Athletic Conference	1984–85	
Nevada	Mountain West Conference	1981–82	
New Hampshire	America East Conference	1981–82	
New Haven	NEC	2025–26	Eligible for an NCAA tournament bid for the first time in 2029.
Niagara	Metro Conference	1989–90	
NJIT	America East Conference	2006–07	
Northern Kentucky	Horizon League	2012–13	
North Alabama	United Athletic Conference	2018–19	
North Carolina Central	Mid-Eastern Athletic Conference	2011–12	
North Dakota State	Summit League	2007–08	
North Florida	Atlantic Sun Conference	2005–06	
Omaha	Summit League	2011–12	
Pacific	West Coast Conference	1984–85	
Purdue Fort Wayne	Horizon League	2001–02	
Queens (NC)	Atlantic Sun Conference	2022–23	
Rider	Metro Conference	1974–75	
St. Thomas (MN)	Summit League	2021–22	
Sam Houston	Conference USA	1987–88	
San José State	Mountain West Conference	1982–83	
SIU Edwardsville	Ohio Valley Conference	2007–08	
Southern Indiana	Ohio Valley Conference	2022–23	Won the 2024 Ohio Valley Conference women's basketball tournament automatic bid but was ineligible due to its transition from Division II to Division I.
South Carolina Upstate	Big South Conference	2007–08	
Stonehill	NEC	2022–23	
Tarleton State	United Athletic Conference	2020–21	
UIC	Missouri Valley Conference	1971–72	
UMass Lowell	America East Conference	2013–14	
UNC Wilmington	Coastal Athletic Association	1984–85	
Utah State	Pac-12 Conference	1972–73	
Utah Tech	Big Sky Conference	2020–21	Changed its name from Dixie State in 2022.
UTRGV	Southland Conference	1982–83	
Wagner	NEC	1970–71	
West Florida	Atlantic Sun Conference	2026–27	Eligible for an NCAA tournament bid for the first time in 2030.
West Georgia	United Athletic Conference	2024–25	Eligible for an NCAA tournament bid for the first time in 2028.
Wofford	Southern Conference	1993–94	
Yale	Ivy League	1973–74	

== See also ==
- NCAA Division I men's basketball tournament bids by school
