= Northeast Conference Women's Basketball Coach of the Year =

Brenda Reilly NEC Women's Basketball Coach of the Year
- Awarded for: the most outstanding women's basketball head coach in the Northeast Conference
- Country: United States
- First award: 1986–87
- Currently held by: Stephanie Gaitley, Fairleigh Dickinson

The Northeast Conference Women's Basketball Coach of the Year is a basketball award given to head coaches in the Northeast Conference (NEC). The award is granted to the head coach voted as the most successful coach of the season by the league's coaches. The award is named in honor of Brenda Reilly, a teacher, sports administrator and three-sport coach in a career of almost three decades at Central Connecticut State University.

The award was first presented following the 1986–87 season, marking the inaugural year of NEC-sponsored women's basketball. Kevin Jones of St. Francis Brooklyn was the inaugural recipient. The program with the most awards is Robert Morris, whose father-son duo of Sal and Charlie Buscaglia have garnered all of the Colonials' seven awards, but Robert Morris left the NEC for the Horizon League after the 2019–20 season. Among current NEC members, Saint Francis has the most awards with five. Sacred Heart, also with five awards, left after the 2023–24 season for the Metro Atlantic Athletic Conference.

== Winners ==
Season	Coach	School	Conference Record	Conference Standing	Overall Record	Postseason	Source(s)
1986–87	Kevin Jones	St. Francis (NY)	9–7	5th	14–15		
1987–88	Mickey McGlade	Monmouth					
1988–89	Gela Mikalauskas	Wagner					
1989–90	Bill Sheahan	Mount St. Mary's					
1990–91	Susan DeKalb	Monmouth					
1991–92	Bill Sheahan (2)	Mount St. Mary's					
1992–93	Sharon Beverly	Fairleigh Dickinson	14–4	T–1st	15–12		
1993–94	Bill Sheahan (3)	Mount St. Mary's					
1994–95	Jenny Przekwas	Saint Francis (PA)					
1995–96	Bill Sheahan (4)	Mount St. Mary's					
1996–97	Jenny Przekwas (2)	Saint Francis (PA)					
1997–98	Irma Garcia	St. Francis (NY)		5th	11–16		
1998–99	Vanessa Blair	Mount St. Mary's					
1999–2000	Patty Delehanty	LIU Brooklyn					
2000–01	Tricia Sacca-Fabbri	Quinnipiac	12–6		16–13		
2001–02	Myndi Hill	Saint Francis (PA)					
2002–03	Myndi Hill (2)	Saint Francis (PA)					
2003–04	Ed Swanson	Sacred Heart					
2004–05	Sal Buscaglia	Robert Morris					
2005–06	Tricia Fabbri (2)	Quinnipiac	15–3		22–8		
2006–07	Stephanie Gaitley	LIU Brooklyn					
2007–08	Ed Swanson (2)	Sacred Heart					
2008–09	Ed Swanson (3)	Sacred Heart			22–4		
2009–10	Sal Buscaglia (2)	Robert Morris					
2010–11	Susan Robinson Fruchtl	Saint Francis (PA)					
2011–12	Ed Swanson (4)	Sacred Heart	15–3	1st	25–8	NEC Champions; NCAA first round	
2012–13	Tricia Fabbri (3)	Quinnipiac	18–0	1st	30–3	NEC Champions; NCAA first round	
2013–14	Sal Buscaglia (3)	Robert Morris	14–4	1st	21–12	NEC Champions; NCAA first round	
2014–15	Beryl Piper	Central Connecticut	14–4	T–1st	19–12	NEC Semifinals	
2015–16	Jessica Mannetti	Sacred Heart	16–2	1st	20–13	NEC Finals; WNIT first round	
2016–17	Charlie Buscaglia	Robert Morris	14–4	1st	21–10	NEC Champions; NCAA first round	
2017–18	Charlie Buscaglia (2)	Robert Morris	16–2	1st	25–8	NEC Finals; WNIT first round	
2018–19	Charlie Buscaglia (3)	Robert Morris	16–2	1st	22–10	NEC Champions; NCAA first round	
2019–20	Charlie Buscaglia (4)	Robert Morris	17–1	1st	23–7	NEC Champions	
2020–21	Maria Marchesano	Mount St. Mary's	14–4	1st	17–6	NEC Champions; NCAA first round	
2021–22	Angelika Szumilo	Fairleigh Dickinson	15–3	1st	19–12	NEC Semifinals; WNIT first round	
2022–23	Angelika Szumilo (2)	Fairleigh Dickinson	14–2	1st	24–8	NEC Finals; WNIT first round	
2023–24	Mary Grimes	Le Moyne	14–2	2nd	18–12	NEC Finals; WNIT first round	
2024–25	Stephanie Gaitley	Fairleigh Dickinson	16–0	1st	29–4	NEC Champions; NCAA first round	
2025–26	Stephanie Gaitley (2)	Fairleigh Dickinson	18–0	1st	TBD	TBD	

== Winners by school ==
School	Winners	Years
Robert Morris (Note: Robert Morris left the NEC for the Horizon League in 2020.)	7	2005, 2010, 2014, 2017, 2018, 2019, 2020
Mount St. Mary's (Note: Mount St. Mary's left the NEC for the Metro Atlantic Athletic Conference in 2022.)	6	1990, 1992, 1994, 1996, 1999, 2021
Saint Francis (PA)	5	1995, 1997, 2002, 2003, 2011
Sacred Heart (Note: Merrimack and Sacred Heart left the NEC for the Metro Atlantic Athletic Conference in 2024.)	5	2004, 2008, 2009, 2012, 2016
Fairleigh Dickinson	5	1993, 2022, 2023, 2025, 2026
Quinnipiac (Note: Monmouth and Quinnipiac left the NEC for the Metro Atlantic Athletic Conference in 2013. Monmouth is now a member of the Coastal Athletic Association, while Quinnipiac remains in the MAAC.)	3	2001, 2006, 2013
St. Francis Brooklyn (Note: St. Francis Brooklyn shut down its athletic program after the 2022–23 season.)	2	1987, 1998
LIU (Note: From 1981 to 2019, Long Island University was represented in the Northeast Conference by its Brooklyn campus, known for athletic purposes as "Long Island" through the 2012–13 season and "LIU Brooklyn" from 2013–14 forward. After the 2018–19 season, LIU merged the athletic programs of its Brooklyn and Post campuses into a single program, now competing as the LIU Sharks, that inherited the NCAA Division I and Northeast Conference memberships of the Brooklyn campus.)	2	2000, 2007
Monmouth	2	1988, 1991
Central Connecticut	1	2015
Le Moyne	1	2024
Wagner	1	1989
Bryant (Note: Bryant left the NEC for the America East Conference in 2022.)	0	—
Chicago State	0	—
Mercyhurst	0	—
Merrimack	0	—
