= Northeast Conference women's basketball tournament =

- Conference basketball championship
- Sport: Basketball
- Conference: Northeast Conference
- Number of teams: 8
- Format: Single-elimination tournament
- Played: 1986–present
- Last contest: 2025
- Current champion: Farleigh Dickinson
- Most championships: Saint Francis (PA) (12)
- Official website: Northeast Conference Basketball

Host locations
- Campus sites (1987–present)

The Northeast Conference women's basketball tournament is the conference championship tournament in women's basketball for the Northeast Conference. It is a single-elimination tournament that in its most recent 2024 edition involved 8 of the 9 then-current league schools, and seeding is based on regular-season records with head-to-head match-up as a tie-breaker. While the NEC lost two members after the 2023–24 season, with Merrimack and Sacred Heart leaving for the Metro Atlantic Athletic Conference, it gained two members at the same time with the addition of Chicago State and Mercyhurst. New Haven joined in 2025, while Saint Francis will leave in 2026 to move to NCAA Division III.

The tournament has been held since 1986, although the winner has only received the conference's automatic bid to the NCAA women's basketball tournament since 1994. Between the 1987 and 1988, when the NEC was still called the ECAC Metro Conference, the tournament was known as the ECAC Metro Conference women's basketball tournament.

The highest seeds face off against the corresponding lowest seeds, with the two remaining teams facing off in the Finals to determine the champion.

Saint Francis (departing in 2026) has the most championships with 12. The next three schools in this category—Robert Morris (8), Mount St. Mary's, and Sacred Heart (5 each)—left the NEC between 2020 and 2024. Among current NEC members, Fairleigh Dickinson (3 titles) is the only other program with more than one champinship.

== History of the tournament final ==
Year	Champion	Score	Runner-up	Location
1987	Monmouth (1)	92–65	Fairleigh Dickinson	West Long Branch, NJ
1988	Robert Morris (1)	63–60	Monmouth	West Long Branch, NJ
1989	Wagner (1)	66–60	Robert Morris	Staten Island, NY
1990	Fairleigh Dickinson (1)	70–65	Mount St. Mary's	Emmitsburg, MD
1991	Robert Morris (2)	69–61	Wagner	Emmitsburg, MD
1992	Fairleigh Dickinson (2)	78–55	Mount St. Mary's	Emmitsburg, MD
1993	Mount St. Mary's (1)	82–61	Marist	Teaneck, NJ
1994	Mount St. Mary's (2)	78–67	Saint Francis (PA)	Emmitsburg, MD
1995	Mount St. Mary's (3)	80–61	Saint Francis (PA)	Emmitsburg, MD
1996	Saint Francis (PA) (1)	83–75	Mount St. Mary's	Emmitsburg, MD
1997	Saint Francis (PA) (2)	54–42	Monmouth	Loretto, PA
1998	Saint Francis (PA) (3)	74–49	Wagner	Loretto, PA
1999	Saint Francis (PA) (4)	88–76	Monmouth	Staten Island, NY
2000	Saint Francis (PA) (5)	74–60	Wagner	Trenton, NJ
2001	Long Island (1)	70–61	Mount St. Mary's	Trenton, NJ
2002	Saint Francis (PA) (6)	74–54	Long Island	Loretto, PA
2003	Saint Francis (PA) (7)	58–41	UMBC	Loretto, PA
2004	Saint Francis (PA) (8)	70–55	Monmouth	Loretto, PA
2005	Saint Francis (PA) (9)	65–50	Robert Morris	Loretto, PA
2006	Sacred Heart (1)	69–65	Quinnipiac	Fairfield, CT
2007	Robert Morris (3)	68–66	Sacred Heart	Fairfield, CT
2008	Robert Morris (4)	86–75	Long Island	Moon Township, PA
2009	Sacred Heart (2)	74–66	Saint Francis (PA)	Fairfield, CT
2010	Saint Francis (PA) (10)	77–68	Long Island	Brooklyn, NY
2011	Saint Francis (PA) (11)	72–57	Monmouth	Loretto, PA
2012	Sacred Heart (3)	58–48	Monmouth	Fairfield, CT
2013	Quinnipiac (1)	72–33	Saint Francis (PA)	Hampden, CT
2014	Robert Morris (5)	78–64	Saint Francis (PA)	Moon Township, PA
2015	St. Francis Brooklyn (1)	77–62	Robert Morris	Moon Township, PA
2016	Robert Morris (6)	56–51	Sacred Heart	Fairfield, CT
2017	Robert Morris (7)	65–52	Bryant	Moon Township, PA
2018	Saint Francis (PA) (12)	66–56	Robert Morris	Loretto, PA
2019	Robert Morris (8)	65–54	Saint Francis (PA)	Moon Township, PA
2020	Canceled due to the COVID-19 pandemic			
2021	Mount St. Mary's (4)	70–38	Wagner	Emmitsburg, MD
2022	Mount St. Mary's (5)	60–42	Bryant	Emmitsburg, MD
2023	Sacred Heart (4)	72–60	Fairleigh Dickinson	Hackensack, NJ
2024	Sacred Heart (5)	69–48	Le Moyne	Fairfield, CT
2025	Farleigh Dickinson (3)	66-49	Stonehill	Hackensack, NJ
2026	Farleigh Dickinson (4)	79-57	LIU	Hackensack, NJ

== Champions ==
School	Championships	Championship Years
Saint Francis (PA)	12	1996, 1997, 1998, 1999, 2000, 2002, 2003, 2004, 2005, 2010, 2011, 2018
Robert Morris	8	1988, 1991, 2007, 2008, 2014, 2016, 2017, 2019
Mount St. Mary's	5	1993, 1994, 1995, 2021, 2022
Sacred Heart	5	2006, 2009, 2012, 2023, 2024
Fairleigh Dickinson	4	1990, 1992, 2025, 2026
St. Francis Brooklyn	1	2015
Wagner	1	1989
LIU	1	2001
Monmouth	1	1987
Quinnipiac	1	2013

- Before the 2019–20 season, each of Long Island University's two main campuses (Brooklyn and Post) operated separate athletic programs, with only the Brooklyn campus (most recently branded athletically as LIU Brooklyn) being an NEC member. The merged LIU program inherited Brooklyn's NEC and Division I memberships, and also inherited the athletic history of the Brooklyn campus in all sports sponsored by that campus before the athletic merger.
- Chicago State, Central Connecticut, Le Moyne, and Stonehill have not yet won an NEC tournament. Mercyhurst, which joined the NEC from Division II in 2024, will not be eligible for the tournament until 2027, and New Haven, which joined from D-II in 2025, will not be eligible until 2028.
- Bryant, Loyola Maryland, Marist, Merrimack, Rider, and UMBC never won the tournament as NEC members.
- Schools highlighted in pink are former members of the NEC as of the upcoming 2025–26 season.

== See also ==
- Northeast Conference men's basketball tournament
