= Northeast Conference Women's Basketball Player of the Year =

NEC Women's Basketball Player of the Year
- Awarded for: the most outstanding basketball player in the Northeast Conference
- Country: United States
- First award: 1987
- Currently held by: Kadidia Toure, LIU

The Northeast Conference (NEC) Women's Basketball Player of the Year is an annual college basketball award given to the Northeast Conference's most outstanding player. The award was first given following the 1986–87 season.

== Key ==
†	Co-Players of the Year
*	Awarded a national player of the year award that same season: the Naismith College Player of the Year, Wade Trophy or the John R. Wooden Award
Player (X)	Denotes the number of times the player has been awarded the Northeast Conference Player of the Year award at that point

== Winners ==
Season	Player	School	Position	Class	Ref.
1986–87	Linda Wilson	Monmouth			
1987–88	Sandra Cook	Monmouth			
1988–89	Maureen Coughlin	Wagner			
1989–90	Kim Rhock	Mount St. Mary's			
1990–91	Vanessa Blair	Mount St. Mary's			
1991–92	Vanessa Blair (2)	Mount St. Mary's			
1992–93	Charlene Fields	Marist			
1993–94	Susie Rowlyk	Mount St. Mary's			
1994–95^{†}	Susie Rowlyk	Mount St. Mary's			
1994–95^{†}	Stacy Alexander	Saint Francis (PA)			
1995–96	Amy Langville	Mount St. Mary's			
1996–97	Mary Markey	Saint Francis (PA)			
1997–98	Jess Zinobile	Saint Francis (PA)			
1998–99	Megan Gardiner	Mount St. Mary's	F	Senior	
1999–00	Jess Zinobile (2)	Saint Francis (PA)	F	Senior	
2000–01	Kia Williams	Mount St. Mary's	G	Senior	
2001–02	Tamika Dudley	LIU Brooklyn	F	Junior	
2002–03	Ashlee Kelly	Quinnipiac	C	Junior	
2003–04	Beth Swink	Saint Francis (PA)			
2004–05	Sugeiry Monsac	Robert Morris	F	Junior	
2005–06	Amanda Pape	Sacred Heart	G	Junior	
2006–07	Valerie Nainima	LIU Brooklyn	G	Freshman	
2007–08	Sade Logan	Robert Morris	G	Junior	
2008–09	Alisa Apo	Sacred Heart	G	Sophomore	
2009–10	Angela Pace	Robert Morris	G	Senior	
2010–11	Samantha Leach	Saint Francis (PA)	G	Senior	
2011–12	Callan Taylor	Sacred Heart	F	Senior	
2012–13	Artemis Spanou	Robert Morris	F	Junior	
2013–14	Artemis Spanou (2)	Robert Morris	F	Senior	
2014–15	Breanna Rucker	Bryant	F	Junior	
2015–16	Hannah Kimmel	Sacred Heart	F	Senior	
2016–17	Anna Niki Stamolamprou	Robert Morris	G	Senior	
2017–18	Jess Kovatch	Saint Francis (PA)	G	Junior	
2018–19	Jess Kovatch (2)	Saint Francis (PA)	G	Senior	
2019–20	Denia Davis-Stewart	Merrimack	F	Senior	
2020–21	Kendall Bresee	Mount St. Mary's	F	Senior	
2021–22	Madison Stanley	Fairleigh Dickinson	G	Graduate student	
2022–23	Ny'Ceara Pryor	Sacred Heart	G	Freshman	
2023–24	Ny'Ceara Pryor (2)	Sacred Heart	G	Sophomore	
2024–25	Belle Lanpher	Central Connecticut	G	Graduate student	
2025–26	Kadidia Toure	LIU	F	Senior	

== Winners by school ==
School	Winners	Years
Mount St. Mary's (Note: Mount St. Mary's left the NEC after the 2021–22 season for the Metro Atlantic Athletic Conference.)	9	1990, 1991, 1992, 1994, 1995, 1996, 1999, 2001, 2021
Saint Francis (PA) (Note: Saint Francis will leave the NEC after the 2025–26 season to start a transition to NCAA Division III as a new member of the Presidents' Athletic Conference.)	8	1995, 1997, 1998, 2000, 2004, 2011, 2018, 2019
Robert Morris (Note: Robert Morris left the NEC after the 2019–20 season for the Horizon League.)	6	2005, 2008, 2010, 2013, 2014, 2017
Sacred Heart (Note: Merrimack and Sacred Heart left after the 2023–24 season for the Metro Atlantic Athletic Conference.)	6	2006, 2009, 2012, 2016, 2023, 2024
LIU (Note: From 1981 to 2019, Long Island University was represented in the Northeast Conference by its Brooklyn campus, known for athletic purposes as "Long Island" through the 2012–13 season and "LIU Brooklyn" from 2013–14 forward. After the 2018–19 season, LIU merged the athletic programs of its Brooklyn and Post campuses into a single program, now competing as the LIU Sharks, that inherited the NCAA Division I and Northeast Conference memberships of the Brooklyn campus. The current LIU women's basketball program inherited Brooklyn's athletic history.)	3	2002, 2007, 2026
Monmouth (Note: Monmouth left the NEC after the 2021–22 season to join the Colonial Athletic Association, now known as the Coastal Athletic Association.)	2	1987, 1988
Wagner	1	1989
Bryant (Note: Bryant left the NEC after the 2021–22 season to join the America East Conference.)	1	2015
Fairleigh Dickinson	1	2022
Marist (Note: Marist left the NEC after the 1996–97 season to join the Metro Atlantic Athletic Conference.)	1	1993
Merrimack	1	2020
Quinnipiac (Note: Quinnipiac left the NEC after the 2012–13 season to join the Metro Atlantic Athletic Conference.)	1	2003
Central Connecticut	1	2025
Chicago State	0	
Le Moyne	0	
Mercyhurst	0	
St. Francis Brooklyn (Note: St. Francis Brooklyn shut down its athletic program after the 2022–23 season.)	0	
Stonehill	0	
