= 2015–16 Northeast Conference women's basketball season =

- League: NCAA Division I
- Sport: Basketball
- Number of teams: 10
- TV partner(s): NEC Front Row, ESPN2, MSG, FCS, Regional Sports Networks

WNBA Draft

Regular Season
- First place: Sacred Heart
- Runners-up: Bryant
- Season MVP: Hannah Kimmel, SHU

NEC Tournament
- Champions: Robert Morris
- Runners-up: Sacred Heart
- Finals MVP: Anna Niki Stamolamprou, RMU

Northeast Conference women's basketball seasons
- ← 2014–15 2016–17 →

2015–16 Northeast Conference women's basketball standings
	Conf.				Overall
Team	W		L	PCT	W		L	PCT
Sacred Heart	16	–	2	.889	20	–	13	.606
Bryant	14	–	4	.778	18	–	13	.581
Robert Morris†	11	–	7	.611	20	–	13	.606
Saint Francis (PA)	11	–	7	.611	15	–	17	.469
Central Connecticut	9	–	9	.500	12	–	18	.400
Fairleigh Dickinson	8	–	10	.444	11	–	21	.344
LIU Brooklyn	7	–	11	.389	9	–	21	.300
Mount St. Mary's	7	–	11	.389	9	–	21	.300
St. Francis Brooklyn	4	–	14	.222	7	–	22	.241
Wagner	3	–	15	.167	5	–	24	.172
† 2016 NEC tournament winner As of March 19, 2016; Rankings from AP poll

The 2015–16 NEC women's basketball season began with practices in October 2015, followed by the start of the 2015–16 NCAA Division I women's basketball season in November. Conference play started in early January 2016 and concluded in March with the 2016 Northeast Conference women's basketball tournament.

== Preseason ==
=== Rankings ===
	NEC Coaches Poll
1.	Robert Morris (7)
2.	Bryant (2)
3.	Central Connecticut (1)
4.	Fairleigh Dickinson
5.	Sacred Heart
6.	Wagner
7.	Mount St. Mary's
8.	Saint Francis (PA)
9.	St. Francis Brooklyn
10.	LIU Brooklyn

() first place votes

=== All-NEC team ===
Coaches Poll

Hannah Kimmel Sacred Heart
Erika Livermore Fairleigh Dickinson
Jasmine Nwajei Wagner
Breanna Rucker Bryant
Anna Niki Robert Morris

== Head coaches ==
Note: Stats shown are before the beginning of the season. All numbers are from time at current school.

Team	Head coach	Previous school	Seasons at school	Overall record
Bryant	Mary Burke	Bryant	24	345–344
Central Connecticut	Beryl Piper	Central Connecticut	8	112–128
Fairleigh Dickinson	Peter Cinella	American International College	8	84–154
LIU Brooklyn	Stephanie Oliver	Seton Hall	0	0–0
Mount St. Mary's	Bryan Whitten	Virginia Commonwealth	8	96–145
Robert Morris	Sal Buscaglia	Manhattan	11	188–150
Sacred Heart	Jessica Mannetti	Hofstra	2	28–31
St. Francis Brooklyn	John Thurston	Fordham	3	45–49
Saint Francis (PA)	Joe Haigh	Saint Francis (PA)	3	38–56
Wagner	Lisa Cermignano	Illinois	3	18–69

== Postseason ==
=== NEC tournament ===
- March 6–13, 2016 Northeast Conference Basketball Tournament.

Quarterfinals; Wednesday, March 6 NEC Front Row
1	Sacred Heart	66
8	Mount St. Mary's	47
4	Saint Francis (PA)	83
5	Central Connecticut	77
(Pairings are reseeded after the first round)
2	Bryant	70
7	LIU Brooklyn	56
3	Robert Morris	68
6	Fairleigh Dickinson	59

Semifinals; Saturday, March 9 NEC Front Row
1	Sacred Heart	92
4	Saint Francis (PA)	71
2	Bryant	59
3	Robert Morris	72

Championship; Tuesday, March 13; ESPNU
1	Sacred Heart	51
3	Robert Morris	56

All games will be played at the venue of the higher seed

=== NCAA tournament ===
Seed	Region	School	1st Round	2nd Round	Sweet 16	Elite Eight	Final Four	Championship
16	Bridgeport Regional	Robert Morris	L, 49–101 vs. #16 Connecticut					

=== National Invitational tournament ===
Seed	Bracket	School	1st Round	2nd Round	Quarterfinals	Semifinals	Championship
		Sacred Heart	L, 59–95 vs. Drake				

== Honors and awards ==
2016 NEC Women's Basketball Individual Awards
Award	Recipient(s)
Player of the Year	Hannah Kimmel, SHU
Coach of the Year	Jessica Mannetti, SHU
Defensive Player of the Year	Leah Fechko, SFBK
Rookie of the Year	Jessica Kovatch, SFU
Most Improved Player of the Year	Alissa Tarsi, SHU

2016 NEC Women's Basketball All-Conference Teams
First Team	Second Team	Third Team	Rookie Team
Hannah Kimmel, Jr., F., SHU; Erika Livermore, Sr., C., FDU; Jasmine Nwajei, Jr., G., WC; Breanna Rucker, Sr., F., BRYANT; Leah Fechko, Sr., G., SFBK	Ivory Bailey, So., G., BRY; Kelsey Cruz, Sr., G., FDU; Jessica Kovatch, Fr., G., SFU; Anna Nicki Stamolamprou, Jr., G., RMU; Alissa Tarsi, Sr., F., SHU	Alexis Carter, Jr., G., MSM; Shanovia Dove, Jr., G., LIU; Camden Musgrave, So., G., CCSU; Shanice Vaughn, Sr., G., LIU; Tiersa Winder, Sr., G., BRY	Madelynn Comly, Fr., G., FDU; Jessica Kovatch, Fr., G., SFU; Maria Palarino, Fr., F., SFBK; Kierra Palmer, Fr., G., BRY; Kiana Patterson, Fr., G., CCSU
† - denotes unanimous selection

== See also ==
2015–16 Northeast Conference men's basketball season
