= 2015–16 St. Francis Brooklyn Terriers women's basketball team =

Intercollegiate basketball season

2015–16 St. Francis Brooklyn Terriers women's basketball
- Conference: Northeast Conference
- Record: 7–22 (4–14 NEC)
- Head coach: John Thurston (4th season)
- Associate head coach: Dionne Dodson (8th season)
- Assistant coaches: Kaitlyn Vican (5th season); Ranait Griff (1st season)
- Home arena: Generoso Pope Athletic Complex

2015–16 Northeast Conference women's basketball standings
| | Conf. | | | | Overall |
| Team | W | | L | PCT | W | | L | PCT |
|---|---|---|---|---|---|---|---|---|
| Sacred Heart | 16 | – | 2 | .889 | 20 | – | 13 | .606 |
| Bryant | 14 | – | 4 | .778 | 18 | – | 13 | .581 |
| Robert Morris† | 11 | – | 7 | .611 | 20 | – | 13 | .606 |
| Saint Francis (PA) | 11 | – | 7 | .611 | 15 | – | 17 | .469 |
| Central Connecticut | 9 | – | 9 | .500 | 12 | – | 18 | .400 |
| Fairleigh Dickinson | 8 | – | 10 | .444 | 11 | – | 21 | .344 |
| LIU Brooklyn | 7 | – | 11 | .389 | 9 | – | 21 | .300 |
| Mount St. Mary's | 7 | – | 11 | .389 | 9 | – | 21 | .300 |
| St. Francis Brooklyn | 4 | – | 14 | .222 | 7 | – | 22 | .241 |
| Wagner | 3 | – | 15 | .167 | 5 | – | 24 | .172 |
† 2016 NEC tournament winner As of March 19, 2016; Rankings from AP poll

The 2015–16 St. Francis Brooklyn Terriers women's basketball team represented St. Francis College during the 2015–16 NCAA Division I women's basketball season. The Terrier's home games were played at the Generoso Pope Athletic Complex. The team was a member of the Northeast Conference. St. Francis Brooklyn was coached by John Thurston, who was in his fourth year at the helm of the Terriers. The previous year, the Terriers won the programs first NEC Tournament and participated in their first NCAA Tournament. For this season, the Terriers returned only one starter from last season and had 7 freshman joining the program.

The Terriers finished 7–22 overall and 4–14 in conference play. The Terriers failed to qualify for the NEC Tournament with their 9th-place finish. Maria Palarino was selected to the All-NEC Rookie Team and Leah Fechko was named the Northeast Conference Defensive Player of the Year and was selected to the All-NEC First Team. In addition on January 11, 2016, Fechko became the 16th member of the St. Francis Brooklyn women's basketball 1,000 points club. She is currently the Terriers' eighth all-time leading scorer with 1,216 points. The guard was the first player (men's or women's) to score 1,000 points, record 800 rebounds, 200 assists, and 200 steals in a career.

== Roster ==
2015–16 St. Francis Brooklyn Terriers women's basketball team
Players
Coaches

| Pos. | # | Name | Height | Year | Hometown |
|---|---|---|---|---|---|
| G | 12 | Leah Fechko (C) | 5 ft 8 in (1.73 m) | Sr | Twinsburg, Ohio |
| G | 3 | Taylor Watson (C) | 5 ft 8 in (1.73 m) | Sr | Southampton, New Jersey |
| F | 35 | Olivia Levey | 6 ft 0 in (1.83 m) | Jr | Seymour, Connecticut |
| G | 11 | Rachel Iozzia | 5 ft 10 in (1.78 m) | Jr | Bayville, New Jersey |
| G | 1 | Blair Arthur | 5 ft 6 in (1.68 m) | So | Allegan, Michigan |
| G | 5 | Becky Pund | 5 ft 7 in (1.7 m) | So | Audubon, New Jersey |
| F | 14 | Alex Delaney | 5 ft 10 in (1.78 m) | So | Sydney, Australia |
| F | 15 | Cassidy Derda | 6 ft 2 in (1.88 m) | So | South Burlington, Vermont |
| G | 4 | Etta Andersen | 5 ft 9 in (1.75 m) | Fr | Copenhagen, Denmark |
| F | 23 | Maria Palarino | 5 ft 10 in (1.78 m) | Fr | Irwin, Pennsylvania |
| G | 24 | Kat Phipps | 5 ft 6 in (1.68 m) | Fr | Spring Lake, New Jersey |
| G | 32 | Dana DiRenzo | 5 ft 10 in (1.78 m) | Fr | Hammonton, New Jersey |
| G | 33 | Mia Ehling | 5 ft 8 in (1.73 m) | Fr | Holmdel, New Jersey |
| F | 34 | Lorraine Hickman | 6 ft 0 in (1.83 m) | Fr | Floral Park, New York |
| F | 40 | Tori Wagner | 6 ft 2 in (1.88 m) | Fr | Freehold, New Jersey |

Head coach

- John Thurston (Seton Hall '70)

Assistant coach(es)

- Dionne Dodson (Muskingum '97)
- Kaitlyn Vican (Fordham '11)
- Ranait Griff (Fordham '13)

Legend

- (C) Team captain
- (S) Suspended
- (I) Ineligible
- (W) Walk-on
- Injured
- Current redshirt

Roster
Last update: November 9, 2015

== Schedule ==
| Date time, TV | Opponent | Result | Record | High points | High rebounds | High assists | Site (attendance) city, state |
Non-conference regular season
| November 15, 2015*; 2:00 pm | at Georgia Tech | L 51–89 | 0–1 | 16 – Fechko | 4 – Levey, Direnzo | 4 – Fechko | Hank McCamish Pavilion (854); Atlanta, GA |
| November 18, 2015*; 7:00 pm | Rider | L 59–71 | 0–2 | 23 – Fechko | 11 – Fechko | 4 – Palarino | Generoso Pope Athletic Complex (355); Brooklyn, NY |
| November 22, 2015*; 2:00 pm | at Saint Peter's | L 40–44 | 0–3 | 9 – Palarino, Arthur | 8 – Fechko | 3 – Fechko | Yanitelli Center (324); Jersey City, NJ |
| November 27, 2015*; 7:00 pm | at Vermont; TD Bank Classic semifinals | W 59–55 | 1–3 | 14 – Fechko | 7 – Fechko, Direnzo | 3 – 3 tied | Patrick Gym (575); Burlington, VT |
| November 28, 2015*; 7:00 pm | vs. Georgetown; TD Bank Classic championship | L 52–74 | 1–4 | 10 – Direnzo | 5 – Palarino | 4 – Fechko | Patrick Gym (461); Burlington, VT |
| December 4, 2015*; 7:00 pm | at Lafayette | L 59–77 | 1–5 | 12 – Pund | 10 – Fechko | 5 – Fechko | Kirby Sports Center (428); Easton, PA |
| December 8, 2015*; 7:00 pm | Army | L 35–74 | 1–6 | 17 – Fechko | 10 – Fechko | 3 – Phipps | Generoso Pope Athletic Complex (200); Brooklyn, NY |
| December 18, 2015*; 7:00 pm | at Manhattan | L 53–61 | 1–7 | 19 – Fechko | 10 – Fechko | 6 – Fechko | Draddy Gymnasium (207); Riverdale, NY |
| December 22, 2015*; 1:00 pm | Loyola (MD) | W 64–54 | 2–7 | 13 – Palarino, Levey | 15 – Fechko | 8 – Fechko | Generoso Pope Athletic Complex (150); Brooklyn, NY |
| December 29, 2015*; 3:00 pm | at Monmouth; Monmouth Holiday Tournament | L 54–63 | 2–8 | 15 – Palarino | 9 – Direnzo, Fechko | 4 – Fechko | Multipurpose Activity Center (937); West Long Branch, NJ |
| December 30, 2015*; 1:00 pm | Norfolk State; Monmouth Holiday Tournament | W 59–55 | 3–8 | 17 – Palarino | 8 – Direnzo | 5 – Iozzia | Multipurpose Activity Center; West Long Branch, NJ |
Northeast Conference Regular Season
| January 2, 2016; 1:00 pm | at Fairleigh Dickinson | L 61–65 | 3–9 (0–1) | 15 – Delaney | 8 – Fechko | 4 – Fechko | Rothman Center (126); Teaneck, NJ |
| January 4, 2016; 4:00 pm | at Mount St. Mary's | L 56–66 | 3–10 (0–2) | 25 – Fechko | 6 – Levey | 4 – Fechko | Knott Arena (253); Emmitsburg, MD |
| January 9, 2016; 1:00 pm | Robert Morris | L 53–62 | 3–11 (0–3) | 19 – Fechko | 11 – Fechko | 3 – Iozzia | Generoso Pope Athletic Complex (203); Brooklyn, NY |
| January 11, 2016; 7:00 pm | Saint Francis (PA) | L 76–83 | 3–12 (0–4) | 20 – Fechko | 10 – Fechko | 5 – Fechko | Generoso Pope Athletic Complex (155); Brooklyn, NY |
| January 16, 2016; 1:00 pm | Sacred Heart | L 51–68 | 3–13 (0–5) | 24 – Fechko | 6 – Fechko | 3 – Levey | Generoso Pope Athletic Complex (485); Brooklyn, NY |
| January 18, 2016; 1:00 pm | Bryant | L 42–70 | 3–14 (0–6) | 8 – Levey, Watson | 7 – Fechko | 3 – Palarino | Generoso Pope Athletic Complex (215); Brooklyn, NY |
| January 23, 2016; 5:00 pm, ESPN3 | at LIU Brooklyn | W 71–51 | 4–14 (1–6) | 21 – Fechko | 8 – Fechko | 6 – Iozzia | Steinberg Wellness Center (117); Brooklyn, NY |
| January 25, 2016; 7:00 pm, ESPN3 | at Wagner | L 53–70 | 4–15 (1–7) | 16 – Fechko | 15 – Fechko | 4 – Phipps | Spiro Sports Center (708); Staten Island, NY |
| January 30, 2016; 1:00 pm | at Central Connecticut | L 61–65 ^{OT} | 4–16 (1–8) | 23 – Levey | 12 – Levey | 8 – Fechko | William H. Detrick Gymnasium (853); New Britain, CT |
| February 1, 2016; 7:00 pm | Wagner | L 78–82 ^{OT} | 4–17 (1–9) | 23 – Fechko | 17 – Fechko | 5 – Fechko | Generoso Pope Athletic Complex (305); Brooklyn, NY |
| February 6, 2016; 1:00 pm | at Sacred Heart | L 55–63 | 4–18 (1–10) | 17 – Delaney | 9 – Fechko | 3 – Fechko, Pund | William H. Pitt Center (306); Fairfield, CT |
| February 8, 2016; 7:00 pm | Fairleigh Dickinson | W 88–78 | 5–18 (2–10) | 25 – Fechko | 13 – Fechko | 5 – Palarino | Generoso Pope Athletic Complex (225); Brooklyn, NY |
| February 13, 2016; 1:00 pm | LIU Brooklyn; Battle of Brooklyn | L 62–65 ^{OT} | 5–19 (2–11) | 16 – Derda | 7 – Derda | 6 – Phipps | Generoso Pope Athletic Complex; Brooklyn, NY |
| February 15, 2016; 1:00 pm | at Bryant | W 58–57 | 6–19 (3–11) | 12 – Arthur | 6 – Fechko, Arthur | 3 – Fechko | Chace Athletic Center (215); Smithfield, RI |
| February 20, 2016; 1:00 pm | at Robert Morris | W 72–65 ^{OT} | 7–19 (4–11) | 20 – Fechko | 9 – Palarino | 7 – Delaney | Charles L. Sewall Center (1,004); Moon Township, PA |
| February 22, 2016; 7:00 pm | at Saint Francis (PA) | L 68–85 | 7–20 (4–12) | 27 – Fechko | 9 – Derda | 5 – Delaney | DeGol Arena (571); Loretto, PA |
| February 27, 2016; 1:00 pm | Mount St. Mary's | L 40–57 | 7–21 (4–13) | 16 – Fechko | 6 – Fechko, Palarino | 2 – 3 tied | Generoso Pope Athletic Complex (215); Brooklyn, NY |
| February 29, 2016; 7:00 pm | Central Connecticut | L 61–67 | 7–22 (4–14) | 16 – Delaney | 9 – Fechko | 6 – Fechko | Generoso Pope Athletic Complex (200); Brooklyn, NY |
*Non-conference game. ^{#}Rankings from AP Poll,. (#) Tournament seedings in parentheses. All times are in Eastern Time..

== See also ==
- 2015–16 St. Francis Brooklyn Terriers men's basketball team
