= 2014–15 Northeast Conference women's basketball season =

- League: NCAA Division I
- Sport: Basketball
- Number of teams: 10
- TV partner(s): NEC Front Row, ESPN3, ESPNU, Regional Sports Networks

WNBA Draft

Regular season
- First place: Bryant; Central Connecticut
- Season MVP: Breanna Rucker BRYANT

NEC Tournament
- Champions: St. Francis Brooklyn
- Runners-up: Robert Morris
- Finals MVP: Sarah Benedetti

Northeast Conference women's basketball seasons
- ← 2013–14 2015–16 →

2014–15 Northeast Conference women's basketball standings
	Conf.				Overall
Team	W		L	PCT	W		L	PCT
Bryant	14	–	4	.778	22	–	9	.710
Central Connecticut	14	–	4	.778	19	–	13	.594
Robert Morris	13	–	5	.722	17	–	15	.531
Sacred Heart	11	–	7	.611	16	–	13	.552
St. Francis Brooklyn†	9	–	9	.500	15	–	19	.441
Fairleigh Dickinson	7	–	11	.389	10	–	20	.333
LIU Brooklyn	6	–	12	.333	9	–	21	.300
Mount St. Mary's	6	–	12	.333	8	–	22	.267
Wagner	5	–	13	.278	7	–	22	.241
Saint Francis (PA)	5	–	13	.278	6	–	23	.207
† 2015 NEC tournament winner As of March 15, 2015; Rankings from AP poll

The 2014–14 NEC women's basketball season began with practices in October 2015, followed by the start of the 2014–15 NCAA Division I women's basketball season in November. Conference play started in early January 2015 and concluded in March with the 2015 Northeast Conference women's basketball tournament.

== Preseason ==
=== Rankings ===
	NEC Coaches Poll
1.	Robert Morris (5)
2.	Sacred Heart (4)
3.	St. Francis Brooklyn (1)
4.	Wagner
5.	Saint Francis (PA)
6.	Bryant
7.	Mount St. Mary's
8.	LIU Brooklyn
9.	Fairleigh Dickinson
10.	Central Connecticut

() first place votes

=== All-NEC team ===
Coaches Poll

Jenniqua Bailey Bryant
Alexa Hayward Saint Francis (PA)
Eilidh Simpson St. Francis Brooklyn
Gabby Washington Sacrd Heart
Jasmine Nwajei Wagner

== NEC regular season ==
=== Conference matrix ===
This table summarizes the head-to-head results between teams in conference play.

	Bryant	Central Conn.	Fairleigh Dickinson	LIU Br'klyn	Mount St. Mary's	Robert Morris	Sacred Heart	St. Francis Br'klyn	Saint Francis (PA)	Wagner
vs. Bryant	–	1–1	0–2	0–2	0–2	1–1	1–1	1–1	0–2	0–2
vs. Central Conn.	1–1	–	0–2	0–2	1–1	1–1	0–2	0–2	1–1	0–2
vs. Fairleigh Dickinson	2–0	2–0	–	2–0	0–2	2–0	1–1	1–1	0–2	1–1
vs. LIU Br'klyn	2–0	2–0	0–2	–	1–1	2–0	1–1	2–0	1–1	1–1
vs. Mount St. Mary's	2–0	1–1	2–0	1–1	–	2–0	2–0	1–1	1–1	0–2
vs. Robert Morris	1–1	1–1	0–2	0–2	0–2	–	1–1	0–2	1–1	1–1
vs. Sacred Heart	1–1	2–0	1–1	1–1	0–2	1–1	–	1–1	0–2	0–2
vs. St. Francis Br'klyn	1–1	2–0	1–1	0–2	1–1	2–0	1–1	–	0–2	1–1
vs. Saint Francis (PA)	2–0	1–1	2–0	1–1	1–1	1–1	2–0	2–0	–	1–1
vs. Wagner	2–0	2–0	1–1	1–1	2–0	1–1	2–0	1–1	1–1	–
Total	14–4	14–4	7–11	6–12	6–12	13–5	11–7	9–9	5–13	5–13

== Postseason ==
=== NEC tournament ===
- March 8–15, 2015 Northeast Conference Basketball Tournament.

Quarterfinals; Sunday, March 8 NEC Front Row
1	Central Connecticut	72
8	LIU Brooklyn	51
4	Sacred Heart	59
5	St. Francis Brooklyn	77
(Pairings are reseeded after the first round)
2	Bryant	76
7	Mount Saint Mary's	54
3	Robert Morris	89
6	Fairleigh Dickinson	61

Semifinals; Wednesday, March 11 (reseeded); ESPN3
1	Central Connecticut	63
5	St. Francis Brooklyn	71^{2OT}
2	Bryant	62
3	Robert Morris	68

Championship; Sunday, March 15; ESPNU
5	St. Francis Brooklyn	77
3	Robert Morris	62

All games will be played at the venue of the higher seed

=== NCAA tournament ===
Seed	Region	School	1st Round	2nd Round	Regional semifinals	Regional finals	Final Four	Championship
16	Albany	St. Francis Brooklyn	L, 33–89 vs. #1 Connecticut					

== Honors and awards ==
2015 NEC Women's Basketball Individual Awards
Award	Recipient(s)
Player of the Year	Breanna Rucker, BRYANT
Coach of the Year	Beryl Piper, CCSU
Defensive Player of the Year	Erika Livermore, FDU
Rookie of the Year	Ivory Bailey, BRYANT

2015 NEC Women's Basketball All-Conference Teams
First Team	Second Team	Defensive Team	Rookie Team
Hannah Kimmel, Jr., F., SHU; Erika Livermore, Jr., C., FDU; Jasmine Nwajei, So., G., WC; Breanna Rucker, Jr., F., BRYANT; Anna Niki Stamolamprou, So., G., RMU	Sophie Bhasin, Jr., G., LIU; Kelsey Cruz, Jr., G., FDU; Alexa Hayward, Sr., G., SFU; TeJahne Malone, Jr., F., CCSU; Jaymee Veney, Sr., F., SFBK	Amanda Andrades, Sr., G., FDU; Leah Fechko, Jr., G., SFBK; Erika Livermore, Jr., C., FDU; Jasmine Nwajei, So., G., WC; Letava Whippy, Sr., G., LIU	Ivory Bailey, Fr., G., BRYANT; Mikalah Mulrain, Fr., C., RMU; Camden Musgrave, Fr., G., CCSU; Megan Smith, Fr., F., RMU; Maya Wynn, Fr., G., SFU
† - denotes unanimous selection

== See also ==
2014–15 Northeast Conference men's basketball season
