= 2016–17 St. Francis Brooklyn Terriers women's basketball team =

Intercollegiate basketball season

2016–17 St. Francis Brooklyn Terriers women's basketball
- Conference: Northeast Conference
- Record: 8–22 (6–12 NEC)
- Head coach: John Thurston (5th season)
- Associate head coach: Dionne Dodson (9th season)
- Assistant coaches: Kaitlyn Vican (6th season); Ranait Griff (2nd season)
- Home arena: Generoso Pope Athletic Complex

2016–17 Northeast Conference women's basketball standings
	Conf.				Overall
Team	W		L	PCT	W		L	PCT
Robert Morris	14	–	4	.778	22	–	11	.667
Sacred Heart	13	–	5	.722	17	–	15	.531
Saint Francis (PA)	13	–	5	.722	17	–	15	.531
Bryant	11	–	7	.611	18	–	14	.563
Mount St. Mary's	10	–	8	.556	12	–	18	.400
Central Connecticut	9	–	9	.500	11	–	20	.355
Fairleigh Dickinson	6	–	12	.333	8	–	22	.267
St. Francis Brooklyn	6	–	12	.333	8	–	22	.267
LIU Brooklyn	5	–	13	.278	6	–	23	.207
Wagner	3	–	15	.167	4	–	25	.138
† 2017 NEC tournament winner As of March 12, 2017; Rankings from AP poll

The 2016–17 St. Francis Brooklyn Terriers women's basketball team represented St. Francis College during the 2016–17 NCAA Division I women's basketball season. The Terrier's home games were played at the Generoso Pope Athletic Complex. The team was a member of the Northeast Conference. St. Francis Brooklyn was coached by John Thurston, who was in his fifth year at the helm of the Terriers. They finished the season 8–22, 6–12 in NEC play to finish in a tie for seventh place. They lost in the quarterfinals of the NEC tournament to Sacred Heart.

== Roster ==
2016–17 St. Francis Brooklyn Terriers women's basketball team
Players
Coaches

Pos.	#	Name	Height	Year	Hometown
F	35	Olivia Levey	6 ft 0 in (1.83 m)	Sr	Seymour, Connecticut
G	11	Rachel Iozzia	5 ft 10 in (1.78 m)	Sr	Bayville, New Jersey
G	5	Becky Pund	5 ft 7 in (1.7 m)	Jr	Audubon, New Jersey
F	14	Alex Delaney	5 ft 10 in (1.78 m)	Jr	Sydney, Australia
G	4	Etta Andersen	5 ft 9 in (1.75 m)	So	Copenhagen, Denmark
F	12	Maria Palarino	5 ft 10 in (1.78 m)	So	Irwin, Pennsylvania
G	24	Kat Phipps	5 ft 6 in (1.68 m)	So	Spring Lake, New Jersey
G	32	Dana DiRenzo	5 ft 10 in (1.78 m)	So	Hammonton, New Jersey
G	3	Mia Ehling	5 ft 8 in (1.73 m)	So	Holmdel, New Jersey
F	34	Lorraine Hickman	6 ft 0 in (1.83 m)	So	Floral Park, New York
F	40	Tori Wagner	6 ft 2 in (1.88 m)	So	Freehold, New Jersey
G	33	Meg Crupi	5 ft 8 in (1.73 m)	Fr	Melbourne, Australia
G	23	Jade Johnson	5 ft 9 in (1.75 m)	Fr	Adelaide, Australia
F	13	Samantha Keltos	6 ft 2 in (1.88 m)	Fr	Ontario, Canada

Head coach

- John Thurston (Seton Hall '70)

Assistant coach(es)

- Dionne Dodson (Muskingum '97)
- Kaitlyn Vican (Fordham '11)
- Ranait Griff (Fordham '13)

Legend

- (C) Team captain
- (S) Suspended
- (I) Ineligible
- (W) Walk-on
- Injured
- Current redshirt

Roster
Last update: August 18, 2016

== Schedule and results ==
Date time, TV	Opponent	Result	Record	High points	High rebounds	High assists	Site (attendance) city, state
Non-conference regular season
November 13, 2016*; 4:00 pm	at James Madison	L 57–83	0–1	9 – Tied	5 – Tied	6 – Iozzia	Convocation Center (3,480); Harrisonburg, VA
November 16, 2016*; 7:00 pm	Monmouth	W 87–78	1–1	19 – Delaney	18 – Palarino	6 – Delaney	Generoso Pope Athletic Complex (335); Brooklyn, NY
November 19, 2016*; 2:00 pm	at Loyola (MD)	L 60–69	1–2	17 – Levey	7 – Palarino	3 – Andersen	Reitz Arena (217); Baltimore, MD
November 25, 2016*; 1:00 pm	at Colorado; Omni Hotels Classic semifinals	L 54–81	1–3	17 – Palarino	4 – Tied	3 – Palarino	Coors Events Center (1,473); Boulder, CO
November 26, 2016*; 3:30 pm	vs. Boston College; Omni Hotels Classic 3rd place game	L 58–73	1–4	14 – Tied	12 – Palarino	3 – Palarino	Coors Events Center (1,495); Boulder, CO
November 30, 2016*; 7:00 pm	Howard	L 63–78	1–5	15 – Levey	11 – Delaney	3 – Tied	Generoso Pope Athletic Complex (225); Brooklyn, NY
December 3, 2016*; 1:00 pm	at Army	L 46–69	1–6	9 – Johnson	13 – Levey	3 – Johnson	Christl Arena (640); West Point, NY
December 7, 2016*; 5:00 pm	Manhattan	L 52–55	1–7	20 – Levey	7 – Palarino	4 – Delaney	Generoso Pope Athletic Complex (185); Brooklyn, NY
December 11, 2016*; 1:00 pm	Saint Peter's	W 58–52	2–7	23 – Delaney	8 – Delaney	5 – Palarino	Generoso Pope Athletic Complex (305); Brooklyn, NY
December 17, 2016*; 2:00 pm	at Iona	L 46–62	2–8	12 – Levey	12 – Levey	3 – Palarino	Hynes Athletic Center (525); New Rochelle, NY
December 21, 2016*; 7:00 pm	at Rider	L 60–77	2–9	20 – Palarino	4 – 3 tied	2 – 4 tied	Alumni Gymnasium (796); Lawrenceville, NJ
NEC Regular Season
December 29, 2016; 1:00 pm	Bryant	W 63–47	3–9 (1–0)	17 – Levey	9 – Levey	4 – Delaney	Generoso Pope Athletic Complex (265); Brooklyn, NY
December 31, 2016; 1:00 pm	Central Connecticut	L 53–61	3–10 (1–1)	17 – Levey	8 – Levey	6 – Iozzia	Generoso Pope Athletic Complex (287); Brooklyn, NY
January 7, 2017; 1:00 pm	at Robert Morris	W 56–49	4–10 (2–1)	18 – Palarino	11 – Palarino	2 – Tied	Charles L. Sewall Center (469); Moon Township, PA
January 9, 2017; 7:00 pm	at Saint Francis (PA)	L 62–79	4–11 (2–2)	17 – Palarino	7 – Keltos	7 – Delaney	DeGol Arena (407); Loretto, PA
January 14, 2017; 12:00 pm, ESPN3	at LIU Brooklyn; Battle of Brooklyn	W 56–54	5–11 (3–2)	11 – Phipps	8 – Tied	3 – 3 Tied	Generoso Pope Athletic Complex (732); Brooklyn, NY
January 16, 2017; 1:00 pm	Sacred Heart	L 74–81	5–12 (3–3)	13 – Levey	8 – Palarino	6 – Delaney	Generoso Pope Athletic Complex (243); Brooklyn, NY
January 21, 2017; 1:00 pm	Mount St. Mary's	L 44–62	5–13 (3–4)	13 – Levey	11 – Delaney	6 – Iozzia	Generoso Pope Athletic Complex (573); Brooklyn, NY
January 23, 2017; 7:00 pm	at Fairleigh Dickinson	W 66–59	6–13 (4–4)	15 – Delaney	10 – Palarino	5 – Palarino	Rothman Center (317); Teaneck, NJ
January 28, 2017; 1:00 pm	Fairleigh Dickinson	L 58–59	6–14 (4–5)	14 – Hickman	8 – Direnzo	4 – Delaney	Generoso Pope Athletic Complex (317); Brooklyn, NY
January 30, 2017; 7:00 pm	at Wagner	L 45–58	6–15 (4–6)	12 – Delaney	7 – Keltos	2 – 3 Tied	Spiro Sports Center (308); Staten Island, NY
February 4, 2017; 1:00 pm	Robert Morris	L 54–61	6–16 (4–7)	13 – Delaney	4 – 2 Tied	4 – Delaney	Generoso Pope Athletic Complex (513); Brooklyn, NY
February 6, 2017; 7:00 pm	Saint Francis (PA)	L 59–75	6–17 (4–8)	13 – 2 Tied	13 – Palarino	5 – Iozzia	Generoso Pope Athletic Complex (236); Brooklyn, NY
February 11, 2017; 1:00 pm	at Bryant	L 54–63	6–18 (4–9)	14 – Delaney	8 – Delaney	4 – Tied	Chace Athletic Center (409); Smithfield, RI
February 13, 2017; 7:00 pm	at Sacred Heart	L 58–61	6–19 (4–10)	20 – Levey	7 – Delaney	4 – Delaney	William H. Pitt Center (171); Fairfield, CT
February 18, 2017; 1:00 pm	Wagner	W 63–50	7–19 (5–10)	17 – Delaney	7 – 3 tied	7 – Iozzia	Generoso Pope Athletic Complex (364); Brooklyn, NY
February 20, 2017; 1:00 pm	LIU Brooklyn	L 58–62	7–20 (5–11)	20 – Levey	10 – Delaney	5 – Iozzia	Generoso Pope Athletic Complex (264); Brooklyn, NY
February 25, 2017; 1:00 pm	at Central Connecticut	L 44–71	7–21 (5–12)	15 – Palarino	7 – Delaney	2 – 3 tied	William H. Detrick Gymnasium (614); New Britain, CT
February 27, 2017; 7:00 pm	at Mount St. Mary's	W 71–55	8–21 (6–12)	18 – Delaney	9 – Iozzia	7 – Delaney	Knott Arena (182); Emmitsburg, MD
Northeast Conference tournament
March 5, 2017; 1:00 pm	at (2) Sacred Heart; Quarterfinals	L 69–90	8–22	16 – Phipps	6 – Tied	4 – Delaney	William H. Pitt Center (344); Fairfield, CT
*Non-conference game. ^{#}Rankings from AP Poll. (#) Tournament seedings in parentheses. All times are in Eastern Time.

== See also ==
- 2016–17 St. Francis Brooklyn Terriers men's basketball team
