= 2016–17 Northeast Conference women's basketball season =

- League: NCAA Division I
- Sport: Basketball
- Number of teams: 10
- TV partner(s): NEC Front Row, ESPN2, MSG, FCS, Regional Sports Networks

WNBA Draft

Regular Season
- First place: Robert Morris
- Runners-up: Sacred Heart
- Season MVP: Anna Niki Stamolamprou, RMU

NEC Tournament
- Champions: Robert Morris
- Runners-up: Bryant
- Finals MVP: Anna Niki Stamolamprou, RMU

Northeast Conference women's basketball seasons
- ← 2015–16 2017–18 →

2016–17 Northeast Conference women's basketball standings
	Conf.				Overall
Team	W		L	PCT	W		L	PCT
Robert Morris	14	–	4	.778	22	–	11	.667
Sacred Heart	13	–	5	.722	17	–	15	.531
Saint Francis (PA)	13	–	5	.722	17	–	15	.531
Bryant	11	–	7	.611	18	–	14	.563
Mount St. Mary's	10	–	8	.556	12	–	18	.400
Central Connecticut	9	–	9	.500	11	–	20	.355
Fairleigh Dickinson	6	–	12	.333	8	–	22	.267
St. Francis Brooklyn	6	–	12	.333	8	–	22	.267
LIU Brooklyn	5	–	13	.278	6	–	23	.207
Wagner	3	–	15	.167	4	–	25	.138
† 2017 NEC tournament winner As of March 12, 2017; Rankings from AP poll

The 2016–17 NEC women's basketball season began with practices in October 2016, followed by the start of the 2016–17 NCAA Division I women's basketball season in November. Conference play started in late December 2016 and concluded in March with the 2017 Northeast Conference women's basketball tournament.

== Preseason ==
=== Rankings ===
	NEC Coaches Poll
1.	Sacred Heart (6)
2.	Robert Morris (3)
3.	Saint Francis (PA) (1)
4.	Bryant
5.	LIU Brooklyn
6.	St. Francis Brooklyn
7.	Central Connecticut
8.	Mount St. Mary's
9.	Fairleigh Dickinson
10.	Wagner

() first place votes

=== All-NEC team ===
Coaches Poll

Hannah Kimmel, Sacred Heart, R-Sr., F.
Shanovia Dove, LIU Brooklyn Sr., G.
Ivory Bailey, Bryant Jr., G.
Jessica Kovatch, Saint Francis (PA), So., G.
Anna Niki Stamolamprou, Robert Morris Sr., G.

== Head coaches ==
Note: Stats shown are before the beginning of the season. All numbers are from time at current school.

Team	Head coach	Previous school	Seasons at school	Overall record
Bryant	Mary Burke	Bryant	25	363–357
Central Connecticut	Beryl Piper	Central Connecticut	9	124–146
Fairleigh Dickinson	Peter Cinella	American International College	9	95–175
LIU Brooklyn	Stephanie Oliver	Seton Hall	1	9–21
Mount St. Mary's	Bryan Whitten	Virginia Commonwealth	9	105–166
Robert Morris	Sal Buscaglia	Manhattan	12	205–165
Sacred Heart	Jessica Mannetti	Hofstra	3	48–44
St. Francis Brooklyn	John Thurston	Fordham	4	52–71
Saint Francis (PA)	Joe Haigh	Saint Francis (PA)	4	53–73
Wagner	Lisa Cermignano	Illinois	4	23–93

== Postseason ==
=== NEC tournament ===
- March 2017 Northeast Conference Basketball Tournament.

Quarterfinals; Sunday, March 5 NEC Front Row
1	Robert Morris	68
8	Fairliegh Dickinson	35
4	Bryant	59
5	Mount St. Mary's	47
(Pairings are reseeded after the first round)
2	Sacred Heart	90
7	St. Francis (NY)	69
3	Saint Francis (PA)	57
6	Central Connecticut	65

Semifinals; Wednesday, March 8 NEC Front Row
1	Robert Morris	70
6	Central Connecticut	62
2	Sacred Heart	68
4	Bryant	75

Championship; Sunday, March 12; ESPNU
1	Robert Morris	65
4	Bryant	52

All games will be played at the venue of the higher seed

=== NCAA tournament ===
Seed	Region	School	1st Round	2nd Round	Sweet 16	Elite Eight	Final Four	Championship
16th	Lexington	Robert Morris	L, 47–77 vs. #1 Notre Dame – (Edmund P. Joyce Center)					

=== National Invitational tournament ===
School	1st Round	2nd Round	Quarterfinals	Semifinals	Championship
Sacred Heart	L, 43–72 vs. St. John's – (Carnesecca Arena)				

=== Women's Basketball Invitational ===
Seed	Bracket	School	1st Round	Quarterfinals	Semifinals	Championship
7th	East	Saint Francis (PA)	W, 79–68 vs. Campbell – (John W. Pope Jr. Convocation Center)	L, 57–67 vs. Milwaukee – (DeGol Arena)		

== All-NEC honors and awards ==
Following the regular season, the conference selected outstanding performers based on a poll of league coaches.

Honor	Recipient
Player of the Year	Anna Niki Stamolamprou, RMU
Coach of the Year	Charlie Buscaglia, RMU
Defensive Player of the Year	Ace Harrison, SFU
Rookie of the Year	Kerstie Phills, WAG
Most Improved Player of the Year	Katherine Haines, SHU
All-NEC First Team	Ace Harrison, SFU
All-NEC First Team	Hannah Kimmel, SHU
All-NEC First Team	Jessica Kovatch, SFU
All-NEC First Team	Alex Klein, BRY
All-NEC First Team	Anna Niki Stamolamprou, RMU
All-NEC Second Team
All-NEC Second Team	Alexis Carter, MSM
All-NEC Second Team	Shanovia Dove, LIU
All-NEC Second Team	Katherine Haines, SHU
All-NEC Second Team	Aleah Epps, CCSU
All-NEC Second Team	Kerstie Phills, WAG
All-NEC Third Team	Caroline Hummell, MSM
All-NEC Third Team	Amina Markovic, FDU
All-NEC Third Team	Katie Reese, FDU
All-NEC Third Team	Megan Smith, RMU
All-NEC Third Team	Adaysha Williams, SHU
All-NEC Rookie Team	Aja Boyd, LIU
All-NEC Rookie Team	Nneka Ezeigbo, RMU
All-NEC Rookie Team	Sydney Holloway, BRY
All-NEC Rookie Team	Kerstie Phills, WAG
All-NEC Rookie Team	Ashlee White, MSM

== See also ==
2016–17 Northeast Conference men's basketball season
