= Anna Niki Stamolamprou =

Greek basketball player

No. 4 – Panathinaikos
- Position: Point guard
- League: Greek League

Personal information
- Born: August 26, 1995 (age 31) Thessaloniki, Greece
- Listed height: 5 ft 7 in (1.70 m)

Career information
- College: Robert Morris (2013–2017)
- WNBA draft: 2017: undrafted
- Playing career: 2011–present

Career history
- 2011–2013: PAOK Thessaloniki
- 2017–2018: Hélios VS Basket
- 2018: Campus Promete
- 2018–2023: Olympiacos
- 2023–: Panathinaikos

Career highlights
- NEC Player of the Year (2017); First-team All-NEC (2015, 2017); 2x NEC Tournament MVP (2016, 2017)

Anna Niki Stamolamprou (born August 26, 1995) is a Greek basketball guard who last played for Panathinaikos and the Greek national team.

She participated at the EuroBasket Women 2017.

== Club honors ==
=== Olympiakos ===
- 4× Greek League Winner: 2018–19,2019–20,2021–22,2022-23
- 2× Greek Cup Winner: 2018–19,2021–22

=== Panathinaikos ===
- 1× Greek Cup Winner: 2023-24
