= 2017 Northeast Conference women's basketball tournament =

- Classification: Division I
- Season: 2016–17
- Teams: 8
- Site: campus sites
- Champions: Robert Morris (7th title)
- Winning coach: Charlie Buscaglia (1st title)
- MVP: Anna Niki Stamolamprou (Robert Morris)

2016–17 Northeast Conference women's basketball standings
	Conf.				Overall
Team	W		L	PCT	W		L	PCT
Robert Morris	14	–	4	.778	22	–	11	.667
Sacred Heart	13	–	5	.722	17	–	15	.531
Saint Francis (PA)	13	–	5	.722	17	–	15	.531
Bryant	11	–	7	.611	18	–	14	.563
Mount St. Mary's	10	–	8	.556	12	–	18	.400
Central Connecticut	9	–	9	.500	11	–	20	.355
Fairleigh Dickinson	6	–	12	.333	8	–	22	.267
St. Francis Brooklyn	6	–	12	.333	8	–	22	.267
LIU Brooklyn	5	–	13	.278	6	–	23	.207
Wagner	3	–	15	.167	4	–	25	.138
† 2017 NEC tournament winner As of March 12, 2017; Rankings from AP poll

The 2017 Northeast Conference women's basketball tournament was held from March 5–8, 2017. The tournament featured the league's top eight seeds, with the higher seed hosting games. Robert Morris won their second consecutive NEC Tournament Championship and seventh overall.

== Format ==
For the thirteenth straight year, the NEC Women’s Basketball Tournament consists of an eight-team playoff format with all games played at the home of the higher seed. LIU Brooklyn and Wagner were the bottom two teams left out of the Tournament. After the quarterfinals, the teams will be reseeded so the highest remaining seed plays the lowest remaining seed in the semifinals.

== Seeds ==
Seed	School	Conference	Overall	Tiebreaker
1	Robert Morris	14–4	19–10	
2	Sacred Heart	13–5	16–13	1–1 vs. SFPA, 2–0 vs. Bryant
3	Saint Francis (PA)	13–5	16–13	1–1 vs. SH, 1–1 vs. Bryant
4	Bryant	11–7	16–13	
5	Mount St. Mary's	10–8	12–17	
6	Central Connecticut State	9–9	10–19	
7	St. Francis Brooklyn	6–12	8–21	1–1 vs. FDU, 1–1 vs. RM
8	Fairleigh Dickinson	6–12	8–21	1–1 vs. SFNY, 0–2 vs. RM

== Bracket ==
Quarterfinals; Sunday, March 5 NEC Front Row
1	Robert Morris	68
8	Fairleigh Dickinson	35
4	Bryant	59
5	Mount St. Mary's	47
(Pairings are reseeded after the first round)
2	Sacred Heart	90
7	St. Francis (NY)	69
3	Saint Francis (PA)	57
6	Central Connecticut	65

Semifinals; Wednesday, March 8 NEC Front Row
1	Robert Morris	70
6	Central Connecticut	62
2	Sacred Heart	68
4	Bryant	75

Championship; Sunday, March 12; ESPNU
1	Robert Morris	65
4	Bryant	52

All games will be played at the venue of the higher seed

== All-tournament team ==
Tournament MVP in bold.

Name	School
**Anna Niki Stamolamprou**	Robert Morris
Megan Smith	Robert Morris
Hannah Kimmel	Sacred Heart
Morgan Olander	Bryant
Naomi Ashley	Bryant
