= 2016 Northeast Conference women's basketball tournament =

- Classification: Division I
- Season: 2015–16
- Teams: 8
- Site: campus sites
- Champions: Robert Morris (6th title)
- Winning coach: Sal Buscaglia (3rd title)
- MVP: Anna Niki Stamolamprou (Robert Morris)

2015–16 Northeast Conference women's basketball standings
	Conf.				Overall
Team	W		L	PCT	W		L	PCT
Sacred Heart	16	–	2	.889	20	–	13	.606
Bryant	14	–	4	.778	18	–	13	.581
Robert Morris†	11	–	7	.611	20	–	13	.606
Saint Francis (PA)	11	–	7	.611	15	–	17	.469
Central Connecticut	9	–	9	.500	12	–	18	.400
Fairleigh Dickinson	8	–	10	.444	11	–	21	.344
LIU Brooklyn	7	–	11	.389	9	–	21	.300
Mount St. Mary's	7	–	11	.389	9	–	21	.300
St. Francis Brooklyn	4	–	14	.222	7	–	22	.241
Wagner	3	–	15	.167	5	–	24	.172
† 2016 NEC tournament winner As of March 19, 2016; Rankings from AP poll

The 2016 Northeast Conference women's basketball tournament was held on March 6, 9, and 13, 2016. The 2016 Northeast Conference tournament featured the league's top eight seeds. The tourney opened on March 6 with the quarterfinals, followed by the semifinals on March 9, and the finals on March 13.

== Bracket ==
Quarterfinals; Sunday, March 6 NEC Front Row
1	Sacred Heart	66
8	Mount St. Mary's	47
4	Saint Francis (PA)	83
5	Central Connecticut	77
(Pairings are reseeded after the first round)
2	Bryant	70
7	LIU Brooklyn	56
3	Robert Morris	68
6	Fairleigh Dickinson	59

Semifinals; Wednesday, March 9 NEC Front Row
1	Sacred Heart	92
4	Saint Francis (PA)	71
2	Bryant	59
3	Robert Morris	72

Championship; Sunday, March 13; ESPNU
1	Sacred Heart	51
3	Robert Morris	56

All games will be played at the venue of the higher seed

== All-tournament team ==
Tournament MVP in bold.

Name	School
**Anna Niki Stamolamprou**	Robert Morris
Ashley Ravelli	Robert Morris
Hannah Kimmel	Sacred Heart
Shelby Hickey	Sacred Heart
Alex Klein	Bryant
