= Quinnipiac Bobcats basketball =

Quinnipiac Bobcats basketball may refer to either of the basketball teams that represent Quinnipiac University:

- Quinnipiac Bobcats men's basketball
- Quinnipiac Bobcats women's basketball
