= Langville (disambiguation) =

Langville may refer to:

== Places ==
- Langville, Pennsylvania
- Laingville, a suburb of St Helena Bay, South Africa
- A former name of Capay, California

== People ==
- Amy Langville
