= Stephanie Gaitley =

American basketball coach

Current position
- Title: Head coach
- Team: Fairleigh Dickinson
- Conference: NEC
- Record: 73–26 (.737)

Biographical details
- Born: January 25, 1960 (age 66); Ocean City, New Jersey, U.S.
- Education: Villanova ('83)

Coaching career (HC unless noted)
- 1985–1991: Richmond
- 1991–2001: Saint Joseph's
- 2002–2008: Long Island
- 2008–2011: Monmouth
- 2011–2022: Fordham
- 2022–2023: Ocean City HS (NJ)
- 2023–present: Fairleigh Dickinson

Head coaching record
- Overall: 757–419 (.644)
Medal record
Assistant Coach for Women's Basketball
United States (ass't coach)
William Jones Cup
Gold medal – first place	2000 Taipei, Taiwan	Team competition

Stephanie Gaitley (née Vanderslice; born January 25, 1960) is an American basketball coach and the current head basketball coach of the Fairleigh Dickinson Knights women's basketball team. She has served as head basketball coach at Fordham University, Monmouth University, and Long Island University (LIU). During her six seasons at LIU, she posted a 95–82 record. In 2007, she guided LIU to a school record 22 wins, and the top overall seed in the NEC tournament. She was named the 2006–07 Northeast Conference (NEC) Women's Basketball Coach of the Year for her efforts. She led LIU to two 20-plus-win seasons, and the first WNIT appearance in school history.

She also served as the head basketball coach at Saint Joseph's University in Philadelphia. She led the Hawks to five 20-win seasons, and two Atlantic 10 championships, as well as five NCAA tournament appearances. She also coached at the University of Richmond from 1985 to 1991. She compiled a 116–63 record, and led the Spiders to two CAA championships, as well as two tournament bids. She was named CAA coach of the year in 1990.

Gaitley was raised in Ocean City, New Jersey.

== USA Basketball ==
Gaitley was named an assistant coach of the team representing the USA in 2000 at the William Jones Cup competition in Taipei, Taiwan. The USA team started strong with a 32-point win over the host team, the Republic of China National Team. They then beat South Korea easily and faced Japan in the third game. Japan started out strongly, and had an 18-point lead in the first half. The USA then out scored Japan 23–3 to take a small lead at the half. The USA built a ten-point lead, but Japan cut it back to three with under a minute to go. Kelly Schumacher grabbed an offensive rebound and scored to bring the lead back to five points and the team held on for the win. Schumacher had 24 points to help the USA team beat Japan 83–80. The final game was against Malaysia, but it was not close, with the USA winning 79–24 to secure a 4–0 record for the competition and the gold medal.

== Head coaching career ==
Sources:

- CAA record book
- A10 Media Guide
- Northeast Conference Record book
- 2002–03 NEC Standings
- A10 Standings
  Record table
  Season	Team	Overall	Conference	Standing	Postseason
  Richmond Spiders (Colonial Athletic Association) (1985–1991)
  1985–86	Richmond Spiders	7–21	2–10	6th	
  1986–87	Richmond Spiders	13–15	6–6	4th	
  1987–88	Richmond Spiders	21–8	8–4	2nd	
  1988–89	Richmond Spiders	24–9	10–2	2nd	
  1989–90	Richmond Spiders	25–5	11–1	1st	NCAA First round
  1990–91	Richmond Spiders	26–5	11–1	T-1st	NCAA First round
  Richmond:		116–63 (.648)	48–24 (.667)		
  Saint Joseph's Hawks (Atlantic 10 Conference) (1991–2001)
  1991–92	Saint Joseph's Hawks	17–12	11–5	T-2nd	
  1992–93	Saint Joseph's Hawks	21–8	10–4	3rd	
  1993–94	Saint Joseph's Hawks	19–9	11–5	3rd	NCAA First round
  1994–95	Saint Joseph's Hawks	20–9	11–5	T-3rd	NCAA First round
  1995–96	Saint Joseph's Hawks	16–12	9–7	3rd	
  1996–97	Saint Joseph's Hawks	26–5	15–1	1st	NCAA Second round
  1997–98	Saint Joseph's Hawks	19–12	10–6	2nd East	WNIT second round
  1998–99	Saint Joseph's Hawks	23–8	14–2	1st East	NCAA Second round
  1999–2000	Saint Joseph's Hawks	25–6	14–2	1st East	NCAA Second round
  2000–01	Saint Joseph's Hawks	10–7	9–7	T-4th	
  Saint Joseph's:		196–88 (.690)	114–44 (.722)		
  LIU Brooklyn Blackbirds (Northeast Conference) (2002–2008)
  2002–03	LIU Brooklyn Blackbirds	15–15	12–6	T-3rd	
  2003–04	LIU Brooklyn Blackbirds	11–17	8–10	T-6th	
  2004–05	LIU Brooklyn Blackbirds	9–18	5–13	9th	
  2005–06	LIU Brooklyn Blackbirds	14–15	11–7	T-4th	
  2006–07	LIU Brooklyn Blackbirds	22–9	15–4	T-1st	WNIT first round
  2007–08	LIU Brooklyn Blackbirds	24–8	13–5	4th	
  LIU Brooklyn:		95–82 (.537)	64–45 (.587)		
  Monmouth Hawks (Northeast Conference) (2008–2011)
  2008–09	Monmouth Hawks	18–13	11–7	T-3rd	
  2009–10	Monmouth Hawks	16–14	11–7	T-4th	
  2010–11	Monmouth Hawks	23–10	13–5	2nd	WNIT first round
  Monmouth:		57–37 (.606)	35–19 (.648)		
  Fordham Rams (Atlantic 10 Conference) (2011–2022)
  2011–12	Fordham Rams	12–18	3–11	12th	
  2012–13	Fordham Rams	26–9	12–2	3rd	WNIT third round
  2013–14	Fordham Rams	25–8	11–5	T-2nd	NCAA first round
  2014–15	Fordham Rams	21–12	11–5	4th	WNIT second round
  2015–16	Fordham Rams	14–17	8–8	T-6th	
  2016–17	Fordham Rams	22–12	11–5	5th	WNIT second round
  2017–18	Fordham Rams	24–10	12–4	3rd	WNIT third round
  2018–19	Fordham Rams	25–9	13–3	T-1St	NCAA first round
  2019–20	Fordham Rams	21–11	11–5	3rd	No postseason due to COVID
  2020–21	Fordham Rams	12–6	8–2	2nd	WNIT first round
  2021–22	Fordham Rams	18–11	8–6	6th	WNIT first round
  Fordham:		220–123 (.641)	108–56 (.659)		
  Fairleigh Dickinson Knights (Northeast Conference) (2023–present)
  2023–24	Fairleigh Dickinson Knights	14–17	11–5	3rd	
  2024–25	Fairleigh Dickinson Knights	29–4	16–0	1st	NCAA First Round
  2025–26	Fairleigh Dickinson Knights	30–5	18–0	1st	NCAA First Round
  Fairleigh Dickinson:		73–26 (.737)	45–5 (.900)		
  Total:		757–418 (.644)			
  National champion Postseason invitational champion Conference regular season champion Conference regular season and conference tournament champion Division regular season champion Division regular season and conference tournament champion Conference tournament champion

== See also ==
- List of college women's basketball career coaching wins leaders
