= Amy Langville =

American mathematician

Amy Nicole Langville (born 1975) is an American mathematician and operations researcher, and is also a former star basketball player at the high school and college levels. One of the main topics in her research is ranking systems such as the PageRank system used by Google for ranking web pages. She has also applied her ranking expertise to basketball bracketology. She is a professor of mathematics at the College of Charleston.

== Education and career ==
Langville grew up in Arnold, Maryland, and was a star basketball player for Archbishop Spalding High School, becoming the top player on the Academic All-Maryland women's basketball team. She also played on the school's volleyball team, was president of the school branch of the National Honor Society, graduated at the top of her class, and was listed by the Maryland Higher Education Commission as a Maryland Distinguished Scholar.

After being "recruited by more than 50 colleges", she became an undergraduate at Mount St. Mary's College and a player for the Mount St. Mary's Mountaineers women's basketball team, on a full basketball scholarship; she was Northeast Conference Women's Basketball Player of the Year for 1995–1996. She earned a bachelor's degree in mathematics at Mount St. Mary's in 1997, as the school valedictorian, and was named to the 1997 GTE academic all-American women's basketball first team. She earned a Ph.D. in operations research at North Carolina State University in 2002. Her dissertation, Preconditioning techniques, was supervised by William J. Stewart.

She remained at North Carolina State University for postdoctoral research, following which she joined the College of Charleston faculty in 2005. She was promoted to full professor in 2015.

== Books ==
Langville is the co-author with Carl D. Meyer of two books on ranking, both published by the Princeton University Press. The first, Google's PageRank and Beyond: The Science of Search Engine Rankings, concerns search engines and the PageRank method used by Google's search engine for ranking web pages in search results; it was published in 2006. The second, Who's #1? — The Science of Rating and Ranking (published in 2012) extends her study to ranking systems more generally. The Basic Library List Committee of the Mathematical Association of America has suggested that it be included in undergraduate mathematics libraries.
