= Chicago State Cougars women's basketball =

Women's college basketball team based in Chicago

Chicago State Cougars
2026–27 Chicago State Cougars women's basketball team
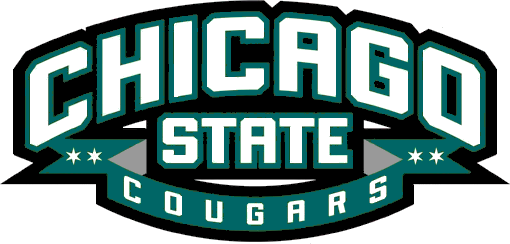
- University: Chicago State University
- Head coach: Corry Irvin (3rd season)
- Location: Chicago, Illinois
- Arena: Emil and Patricia Jones Convocation Center (capacity: 7,000)
- Conference: NEC
- Nickname: Cougars
- Colors: Green and white

Conference tournament champions
- 2011 (Great West)

Conference regular-season champions
- 2011 (Great West)

The Chicago State Cougars women's basketball team represents Chicago State University in Chicago, Illinois, United States. The school's team currently competes as a member of the Northeast Conference, which they joined in July 2024.

== History ==
Chicago State began play in 1966, beginning Division I play in 1984. They have an all-time record (as of the end of the 2015–16 season) of 234–670, with one postseason appearance in program history, the 2011 Women's Basketball Invitational. They played in the ECC for the 1993–94 season before playing in the Mid-Continent Conference (now known as the Summit League) in 1994, playing until 2006. They were independent from 2006 to 2009 before joining the Great West Conference. The Cougars won the regular season and conference tournament title in 2011, going 11–1 in the conference while beating North Dakota 74–66 to win the title. The conference did not have an automatic bid to the NCAA tournament, though they did receive a bid to the WBI. The 2016–17 team lost every single game, going 0–29, including a loss to Seattle in the first round in the WAC Tournament to end their season. On February 8, 2018, the Cougars beat Utah Valley 84–74 to break a losing streak of 59 games, an NCAA record.

== Postseason ==
=== Women's Basketball Invitational ===
Year	Round	Opponent	Result
2011	First Round; Quarterfinals; Semifinals	Eastern Illinois; Cleveland State; Cal State Bakersfield	W 73-64; W 68-50; L 93-92 (OT)
