= Quinnipiac Bobcats women's basketball =

2026–27 Quinnipiac Bobcats women's basketball team
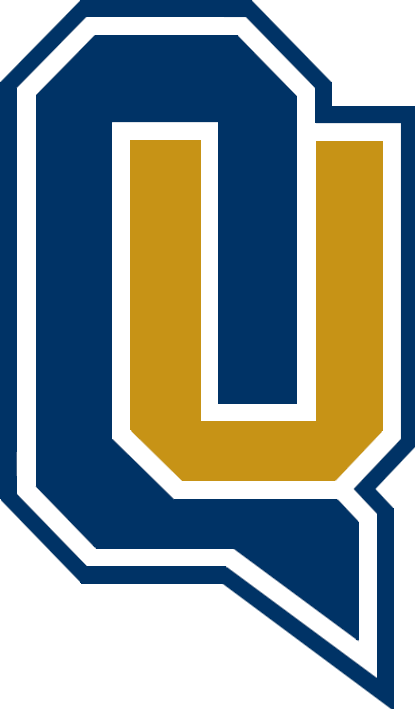
- University: Quinnipiac University
- Head coach: Roman Owen (1st season)
- Location: Hamden, Connecticut
- Arena: M&T Bank Arena (capacity: 3,570)
- Conference: The Metro
- Nickname: Bobcats
- Colors: Navy and gold

NCAA Division I tournament Sweet Sixteen
- 2017

NCAA Division I tournament appearances
- 2013, 2015, 2017, 2018, 2019

Conference tournament champions
- NEC: 2013; MAAC: 2015, 2017, 2018, 2019

Conference regular-season champions
- NEC: 2008, 2013; MAAC: 2014, 2015, 2016, 2017, 2018, 2019, 2026

The Quinnipiac Bobcats women's basketball team represents Quinnipiac University in Hamden, Connecticut, United States. The school's team currently competes in the Metro Atlantic Athletic Conference.

== History ==
Quinnipiac began play in Division I in 1998. They joined the Northeast Conference in 1999, playing until 2013, when they joined the MAAC. They have made the NCAA Tournament in 2013, 2015, and 2017. They made the Sweet Sixteen in the latter year by garnering their first ever Tournament win along with the furthest they have ever made in the NCAA Tournament. This was the first time since 2007 (Marist) that a MAAC team had made the Sweet Sixteen. They have made the WNIT in 2008, 2012, 2014, and 2016. Since joining Division I, the Bobcats (as of the end of the 2015–16 season) have a record of 335–207.

Quinnipiac announced on March 16, 2026 that Fabbri would retire at the conclusion of the 2025–26 season.

== Postseason appearances ==
=== NCAA Division I tournament results ===
The Bobcats have made the NCAA Division I women's basketball tournament five times. They have a record of 3–5.

Year	Seed	Round	Opponent	Result
2013	#13	First Round	#4 Maryland	L 52–72
2015	#12	First Round	#5 Oklahoma	L 84–111
2017	#12	First Round; Second Round; Sweet Sixteen	#5 Marquette #4 Miami #1 South Carolina	W 68–65; W 85–78; L 58–100
2018	#9	First Round; Second Round	#8 Miami #1 UConn	W 86–72; L 71–46
2019	#11	First Round	#6 South Dakota State	L 65–76

=== NCAA Division II tournament results ===
The Bobcats, then known as the Braves, made the NCAA Division II women's basketball tournament three times. They had a record of 3–3.

Year	Round	Opponent	Result
1984	Regional Finals; Elite Eight	Bentley; Virginia Union	W, 71–50; L, 67–72
1985	Regional Finals; Elite Eight	Bentley; Mercer	W, 74–58; L, 76–86
1986	First Round; Regional Finals	New Haven; Central Connecticut State	W, 62–60; L, 63–87

=== WNIT appearances ===
The Bobcats have made the Women's National Invitation Tournament five times. They have a record of 2–5.

Year	Round	Opponent	Result
2008	First Round	Iona	L 59–71
2012	First Round	Temple	L 60–75
2014	First Round	Villanova	L 66–74
2016	First Round; Second Round	Maine; Temple	W 90–43; L 62–64
2022	First Round; Second Round	Rhode Island; Boston College	W 61–50; L 94–68

=== WBIT appearances ===
The Bobcats have made the Women's National Invitation Tournament one time. They have a record of 1–1.

Year	Seed	Round	Opponent	Result
2026		First Round; Second Round	#3 George Mason #2 Stanford	W 71–64; L 69–81
