= Mercyhurst Lakers women's basketball =

NCAA Division I men's basketball team representing Mercyhurst University

| 2026–27 Mercyhurst Lakers women's basketball team |
- University: Mercyhurst University
- First season: 1974–75 (51 years ago)
- Head coach: Erin Mills-Reid (2nd season)
- Arena: Mercyhurst Athletic Center (capacity: 1,100)
- Conference: NEC
- Nickname: Lakers
- Colors: Forest green and navy blue

NCAA Division I tournament Elite Eight
- Division II: 1995
Other NCAA Division I tournament results
| Sweet Sixteen | Division II: 1995 |
| Appearances | Division II: 1994, 1995, 2017 |

Uniforms
| Home | Away |

The Mercyhurst Lakers women's basketball program is the women's college basketball team of Mercyhurst University. The Lakers compete in Division I of the National Collegiate Athletic Association (NCAA) as a member of the Northeast Conference since July 1, 2024. They will become full members in the 2028-29 season after finishing the four-year NCAA Division I reclassification period.
