= New Haven Chargers women's basketball =

NCAA Division I men's basketball team representing Mercyhurst University

New Haven Chargers
2026–27 New Haven Chargers women's basketball team
- University: University of New Haven
- First season: 1975–76 (50 years ago)
- Head coach: Debbie Buff (7th season)
- Location: West Haven, Connecticut
- Arena: The Jeffrey P. Hazell Center
- Conference: NEC
- Nickname: Chargers
- Colors: Blue and gold

NCAA Division II tournament champions
- 1987

NCAA Division II tournament Final Four
- 1987

NCAA Division II tournament Elite Eight
- 1987, 1988, 2015

NCAA Division II tournament Sweet Sixteen
- 1987, 1988, 1989 2015

NCAA Division II tournament appearances
- 1986, 1987, 1988, 1989, 2003, 2006, 2007, 2014, 2015

Conference tournament champions
- NECC: 1986, 1987, 1988, 1989; East Coast: 2006, 2007

Uniforms
Home	Away

The New Haven Chargers women's basketball program is the women's college basketball team of University of New Haven. The team competes in the National Collegiate Athletic Association's Division I and is a member of the Northeast Conference since July 1, 2025. They will become full members in the 2028–29 season after finishing the four-year NCAA Division I reclassification period. Previously, they competed in NCAA Division II. They won the 1987 women's basketball tournament for the first national championship in program history.

== Postseason ==
=== Division II ===
New Haven competed in the Division II tournament nine times. They had a record of 10–8.

Year	Round	Opponent	Result
1986	Round of 24	Quinnipiac	L 60–62
1987	Sweet Sixteen; Elite Eight; Final Four; Championship Game	#13 Stonehill #4 Hampton #7 Northern Kentucky #2 Cal-Poly Pomona	W 72–64; W 65–63; W 77–74; W 77–75
1988	Round of 32; Sweet Sixteen; Elite Eight	Stonehill; Bentley; Delta State	W 85–69; W 50–49; L 70–97
1989	Round of 32; Sweet Sixteen	Bryant; Bentley	W 94–71; L 71–76
2003	Round of 64	Bentley	L 65–92
2006	Round of 64	Stonehill	L 70–77
2007	Round of 64	#7 Southern Connecticut	L 45–68
2014	Round of 64	Adelphi	L 86–92
2015	Round of 64; Round of 32; Sweet Sixteen; Elite Eight	Philadelphia; Franklin Pierce #13 Stonehill; Cal Baptist	W 69–55; W 69–59; W 58–57; L 77–86

== Notes ==
Template:New Haven Chargers women's basketball navbox
