= Merrimack Warriors women's basketball =

Merrimack Warriors
2026–27 Merrimack Warriors women's basketball team
- University: Merrimack College
- Head coach: Missy Traversi (1st season)
- Location: North Andover, Massachusetts
- Arena: Merrimack Athletics Complex (capacity: 1,200)
- Conference: Metro Atlantic Athletic Conference
- Nickname: Warriors
- Colors: Blue and gold

NCAA Division II tournament Final Four
- 2004, 2005
Other NCAA Division II tournament results
Elite Eight	2004, 2005
Sweet Sixteen	2004, 2005
Appearances	2003, 2004, 2005

Conference tournament champions
- NE10; 2004*

Conference regular-season champions
- NE10; 2004* 2005*
- * Division II

The Merrimack Warriors women's basketball team represents Merrimack College in North Andover, Massachusetts, United States. The school's team currently competes in the Metro Atlantic Athletic Conference. They are currently led by Missy Traversi and play their home games at the Hammel Court in the Merrimack Athletics Complex.

== History ==
The Merrimack women’s basketball program played their first season in 1972 as an independent. They had their first sign of success during the 1980–81 season when they went 19–5. In 1984, they joined the Northeast-10 Conference, going 2–12 in the conference in their first year. The program struggled from 1984 to 2001, not having a single winning season. Things changed during the 2002–03 season. At the direction of fourth year coach Ann McInerney, they saw unprecedented success. The Warriors went 20–7 in the regular season, leading to their first-ever bid to the NCAA tournament. They won their first round matchup vs Dowling before eventually losing to Bentley 71–43. This was the start of something special for the program. The following year, they went 19–3 in the conference, winning their first-ever regular season title. They also won their first conference tournament that year, beating Bentley 73–57 in the championship game. They then went on to make a deep run in the 2004 NCAA tournament. They defeated Adelphi in the first round by a score of 92–67 and AIC in the second round, 91–57. They then met Bryant in the Sweet 16, beating them 70–57 to win their first-ever regional championship. Moving on to the Elite 8, they beat Augusta State, 76–68. Their season came to a end in the Final Four, when they lost to California (PA), 89–65. They finished the historic season with a program best 31–4 record. They kept up this success the next season as well, going 25–6 in the regular season and winning another regular season title. They were runners-up in the NE10 championship game, but still received an at-large bid to the 2005 NCAA tournament to make a third consecutive appearance. They once again won their first round matchup against Bridgeport, 72–46, and then beat AIC, 76–67, in the round of 32. They then faced Bentley in the Sweet 16 beating them 52–44, winning a second straight regional championship. They won a close game in the Elite 8, beating St Cloud State, 79–78. For a second year in a row, they fell in the Final Four, this time to Seattle Pacific, 73–64. This 3 year stretch would be the best in program history.

Coach McInerney left after the 2004-05 season. The program once again went into a slump throughout the mid 2000s into the 2010s. The 2018–19 season was their final at the Division II level, going 20–10 overall.

During the 2019–20 season, the program joined Division I and the Northeast Conference. Led by Coach Monique LeBlanc, the Warriors saw see great success in their first year at the D1 level. In their first game, they beat UMass, 79–64. They finished the year with an overall record of 20–9 and a conference record of 13–5. Denia Davis Stewart wase named conference player of the year as well as defensive player of the year. Coach LeBlanc left after the season, taking the job at Brown University. The Warriors then hired coach Kelly Morrone as the next head coach. They went on to play another 4 years in the NEC.

In 2024, the Warriors joined the MAAC. They went 14–17 in their first year before eventually losing to Quinnpiac in the MAAC semifinals, 65–51.

== Individual awards ==
=== Player awards ===
NEC player of the year

- Denia Davis-Stewart (2020)

NEC Defensive player of the year

- Denia Davis-Stewart (2020)

NE10 Rookie of the year

- Beth Pickles (1991)
- Joelle Martin (2003)
- Alyssa Casey (2018)

NE10 Defensive player of the year

- Jenny Smith (2005)
- Denia Davis-Stewart (2019)

=== Coach awards ===
NE10 coach of the year

- Ann McInerney (2004)

=== All-Americans ===
- Jennifer Jenkins (1989)
- Joelle Martin (2005, 2007)
