= Bryant Bulldogs women's basketball =

American college basketball team

2025–26 Bryant Bulldogs women's basketball team
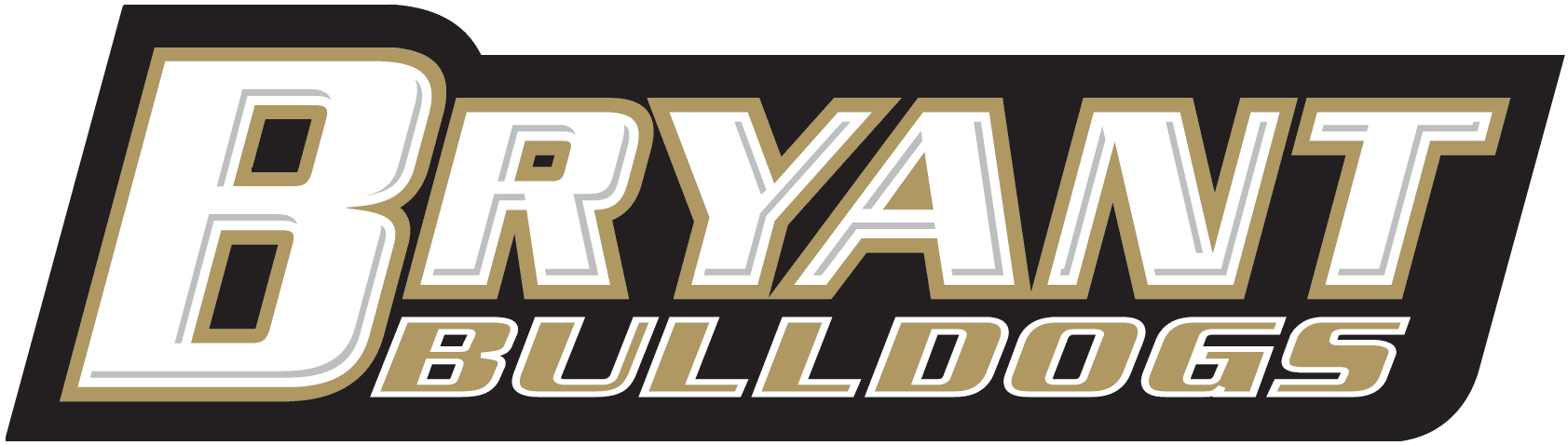
- University: Bryant University
- Head coach: Lynne-Ann Kokoski (2nd season)
- Location: Smithfield, Rhode Island
- Arena: Chace Athletic Center (capacity: 2,770)
- Conference: America East Conference
- Nickname: Bulldogs
- Colors: Black and gold

NCAA Division I tournament Sweet Sixteen
- 2004*

NCAA Division I tournament appearances
- 1986*, 1988*, 1989*, 1996*, 2004*, 2005*, 2008*

Conference tournament champions
- Northeast-10: 1986, 1988, 1989

Conference regular-season champions
- 2015

Uniforms
Home	Away
- * at Division II level

The Bryant Bulldogs women's basketball team represents Bryant University in NCAA Division I women's basketball. The team currently competes in the America East Conference.

== History ==
The Bulldogs began play in Division I in 2008 after 31 years in Division II. Previously, they played in the Northeast-8/10 Conference. The Bulldogs made the Women's Basketball Invitational in 2014.

== Postseason ==
=== NCAA Division II tournament results ===
The Bulldogs made seven appearances in the NCAA Division II women's basketball tournament. They had a combined record of 2–7.

Year	Round	Opponent	Result
1986	First Round	North Dakota State	L 63–81
1988	First Round	Delta State	L 65–98
1989	First Round	New Haven	L 71–94
1996	First Round	Bridgeport	L 79–82
2004	First Round; Second Round; Third Round	Bentley; Stonehill; Merrimack	W 70–65; W 70–58; L 57–70
2005	First Round	Bentley	L 56–67
2008	First Round	Stonehill	L 58–67
