= Robert Morris Colonials women's basketball =

American college basketball team

Robert Morris Colonials
2025–26 Robert Morris Colonials women's basketball team
- University: Robert Morris University
- Head coach: Chandler McCabe (2nd season)
- Location: Moon Township, Pennsylvania
- Arena: UPMC Events Center (capacity: 4,000)
- Conference: Horizon League
- Nickname: Colonials
- Colors: Blue, white, and red
- Student section: Colonial Crazies

NCAA Division I tournament appearances
- 2007, 2008, 2014, 2016, 2017, 2019

Conference tournament champions
- 1988, 1991, 2007, 2008, 2014, 2016, 2017, 2019

Conference regular-season champions
- 2007, 2008, 2010, 2014, 2017, 2018, 2019, 2020

Uniforms
Home	Away

The Robert Morris Colonials women's basketball team is the basketball team that represents Robert Morris University in Moon Township, Pennsylvania, United States. The school's team currently competes in the Horizon League.

== History ==
Robert Morris began its women's basketball program in 1970, and rattled off 11 straight winning seasons from 1978–79 to 1988–89. Under RMU Athletic Hall of Fame head coach Dan Swalga, the Colonials achieved their first 20-win season in 1981–82 at 20–8, won the Pennwood West tournament after a 23–5 campaign in 1983–84, and captured their first ECAC Metro (now Northeast Conference) Tournament championship in 1988. Swalga led RMU to a second NEC tournament title in 1991, but the program then fell into a 16-season championship drought.

After winning just seven games over a three-season span, the Colonials hired Sal Buscaglia from Manhattan to turn around the program. RMU went 3–24 in Buscaglia's first season, but rebounded with a 20–10 record in 2004–05 - marking the third-largest single-season turnaround in NCAA history. Another 20-win season followed, then the Colonials won their third NEC tournament championship and advanced to the program's first NCAA tournament in 2006–07. RMU added a second NCAA tournament berth the next season, and earned a postseason WNIT berth in 2009–10 after going 17–1 in league play.

Following an injury-plagued 2012–13 season, RMU reached the peak again in 2013–14 with its fifth NEC tournament title and third NCAA tournament berth. Two years later, Buscaglia added another NEC tournament crown and NCAA tournament bid in his final season on the bench, before handing over the reins to his son, Charlie Buscaglia, prior to the 2016–17 season.

Coach B has continued to raise the standard for the program. In his first season, the Colonials made it back-to-back NEC tournament championships and played in their fifth NCAA tournament, then followed that with a school-record 25 wins and Postseason WNIT berth in 2017–18. In 2018–19, RMU went 16–2 in league play - including a 11–0 start - winning their eighth NEC tournament and sixth NCAA tournament bid. This past season, the Colonials went 23-7 and started a program-best 14–0 in the NEC, and became the first team since Saint Francis U from 2001 to 2005 to win at least a share of four consecutive NEC regular-season crowns. RMU moved on to the NEC Tournament semifinals and were recipients of the conference's NCAA tournament berth after the cancellation of the NEC Tournament due to the COVID-19 outbreak.

In the classroom, the Colonials ranked in the top five of NCAA Division I women's basketball in cumulative grade point average, finishing second in 2016–17 and fourth in 2017–18.

Overall, RMU has captured eight NEC Tournaments, eight NEC regular-season titles, and played in nine national postseason tournaments (6 NCAA, 2 WNIT, 1 WBI). The Colonials have won 20 or more games in 13 seasons.

== Postseason results ==
=== NCAA tournament results ===
The Colonials have appeared in the NCAA tournament six times. Their combined record is 0–6.

Year	Seed	Round	Opponent	Result
2007	#13	First Round	#4 N.C. State	L 52–84
2008	#15	First Round	#2 Rutgers	L 42–85
2014	#16	First Round	#1 Notre Dame	L 42–93
2016	#16	First Round	#1 Connecticut	L 49–101
2017	#16	First Round	#1 Notre Dame	L 49–79
2019	#16	First Round	#1 Louisville	L 34–69

=== WNIT results ===
The Colonials have appeared in two Women's National Invitation Tournaments (WNIT). Their record is 0–2.

Year	Round	Opponent	Result
2010	First Round	St. Bonaventure	L 50–76
2018	First Round	Drexel	L 44–57

=== WBI results ===
The Colonials have appeared in one Women's Basketball Invitational (WBI). Their record is 0–1.

Year	Round	Opponent	Result
2012	First Round	Manhattan	L 54–77

== Award history ==
NEC Player of the Year: 6
- Last: Anna Niki Stamolamprou, 2016–17
NEC Rookie of the Year: 2
- Last: Ashley Ravelli, 2012–13
NEC Defensive Player of the Year: 2
- Last: Nneka Ezeigbo, 2018–19
NEC Coach of the Year: 7
- Last: Charlie Buscaglia, 2019–20
NEC Scholar-Athlete of the Year: 3
- Last: Nneka Ezeigbo, 2019–20
NEC Tournament MVP: 8
- Last: Nneka Ezeigbo, 2019
All-NEC First Team: 22
- Last: Nneka Ezeigbo, 2019–20
All-NEC Second Team: 21
- Last: Irekpitan Ozzy-Momodu, 2019–20
All-NEC Third Team: 2
- Last: Isabella Posset, 2019–20
All-NEC Rookie Team: 16
- Last: Isabella Posset, 2018–19
All-NEC Tournament Team: 24
- Last: Nina Augustin & Nneka Ezeigbo, 2019
