= Saint Francis Red Wolves women's basketball =

Saint Francis Red Flash
2026–27 Saint Francis Red Flash women's basketball team
- University: Saint Francis University
- Head coach: Raphael McNeill
- Location: Loretto, Pennsylvania
- Arena: DeGol Arena (capacity: 3,500)
- Conference: Presidents' Athletic Conference
- Nickname: Red Wolves
- Colors: Red and white

NCAA Division I tournament appearances
- 1996, 1997, 1998, 1999, 2000, 2002, 2003, 2004, 2005, 2010, 2011, 2018

Conference tournament champions
- 1996, 1997, 1998, 1999, 2000, 2002, 2003, 2004, 2005, 2010, 2011, 2018

Conference regular-season champions
- 1997, 1998, 2000, 2002, 2003, 2004, 2005, 2011, 2018

The Saint Francis Red Wolves women's basketball team represents Saint Francis University in Loretto, Pennsylvania, United States. The school's team currently competes in the Presidents' Athletic Conference.

== History ==
The Red Flash went to the NCAA tournament 11 times in a 15 year span from 1996 to 2011. They have been a member of the Northeast Conference in women's basketball since 1988, after one season in the ECAC Metro. They have lost in the first round of the tournament each time they have played, with their closest loss being a 51–36 defeat to Villanova in 2003. As of the end of the 2015-16 season, they have a varsity all-time record of 524–587. They are transitioning to Division III, a process intended to be completed by the 2029–2030 academic year, but they competed as a Division I institution for 2025–2026 season.

== NCAA tournament results ==
The Red Wolves have appeared in the NCAA Division I women's basketball tournament twelve times. Their record is 0–12.

Year	Seed	Round	Opponent	Result
1996	#15	First Round	#2 Georgia	L 66–98
1997	#15	First Round	#2 Georgia	L 50–94
1998	#16	First Round	#1 Old Dominion	L 39–92
1999	#16	First Round	#1 Connecticut	L 46–97
2000	#14	First Round	#3 Iowa State	L 63–92
2002	#16	First Round	#1 Connecticut	L 37–86
2003	#15	First Round	#2 Villanova	L 36–51
2004	#15	First Round	#2 Purdue	L 59–78
2005	#14	First Round	#3 Minnesota	L 33–64
2010	#15	First Round	#2 Ohio State	L 59–93
2011	#13	First Round	#4 Maryland	L 48–70
2018	#16	First Round	#1 Connecticut	L 52–140
