= Central Connecticut Blue Devils women's basketball =

Central Connecticut Blue Devils
2025–26 Central Connecticut Blue Devils women's basketball team
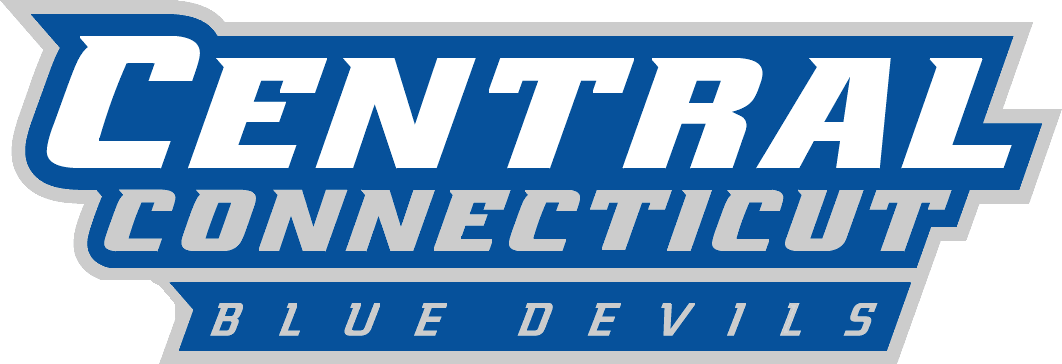
- University: Central Connecticut State University
- Head coach: Kristin Caruso (1st season)
- Location: New Britain, Connecticut
- Arena: William H. Detrick Gymnasium (capacity: 2,654)
- Conference: Northeast Conference
- Nickname: Blue Devils
- Colors: Blue and white
- All-time record: 524–818

NCAA Division I tournament Sweet Sixteen
- 1986 (Division II)

NCAA Division I tournament appearances
- 1986 (NCAA Division II)

Conference regular-season champions
- 2015

Uniforms
Home	Away

The Central Connecticut Blue Devils women's basketball team represents Central Connecticut State University in New Britain, Connecticut, United States. The school's team currently competes in the Northeast Conference.

== History ==
Central Connecticut began play in 1971. They played in Division II from 1971-1986. As of the end of the 2015-16 season, the Blue Devils have an all-time record of 467-673. They have never made the NCAA Tournament, but they have made the WNIT in 2009 and 2015.

Head coach Beryl Piper was placed on administrative leave on January 16, 2020. In May 2020 Piper announced her retirement from CCSU. She retires as the most winning head coach in CCSU women's basketball history. Assistant coach Kerri Reaves took over the head coaching position on an interim basis.

In April 2023, Central Connecticut State announce that Way Veney would become the new head coach of the women's basketball program. She resigned in April 2025 with an overall record of 20–40.

== Season-by-season results ==
Season	Coach	Overall	Conference	Standing	Postseason
Dr. Brenda Reilly () (1971–1996)
1971–72	Dr. Brenda Reilly	9–6			
1972–73	Dr. Brenda Reilly	3–9			
1973–74	Dr. Brenda Reilly	4–7			
1974–75	Dr. Brenda Reilly	9–12			
1975–76	Dr. Brenda Reilly	10–7			
1976–77	Dr. Brenda Reilly	11–4			
1977–78	Dr. Brenda Reilly	12–5			
1978–79	Dr. Brenda Reilly	13–8			
1979–80	Dr. Brenda Reilly	18–5			
1980–81	Dr. Brenda Reilly	9–15			
1981–82	Dr. Brenda Reilly	10–15			
1982–83	Dr. Brenda Reilly	13–9			
CCSU (New England Collegiate Conference) (1983–1985)
1983–84	Dr. Brenda Reilly	9–18			
1984–85	Dr. Brenda Reilly	11–14			
CCSU (Division II Independent) (1985–1986)
1985–86	Dr. Brenda Reilly	24–4			NCAA DII
Division I
CCSU (Division I Independent) (1986–1987)
1986–87	Dr. Brenda Reilly	12–13			
1987–88	Dr. Brenda Reilly	7–19			
1988–89	Dr. Brenda Reilly	12–14			
1989–90	Dr. Brenda Reilly	21–7			
CCSU (East Coast Conference) (1990–1994)
1990–91	Dr. Brenda Reilly	7–21			
1991–92	Dr. Brenda Reilly	7–22			
1992–93	Dr. Brenda Reilly	6–20			
1993–94	Dr. Brenda Reilly	6–20			
CCSU (Mid-Continent Conference) (1994–1997)
1994–95	Dr. Brenda Reilly	6–20			
1995–96	Dr. Brenda Reilly	2–24			
Dr. Brenda Reilly:		219–303			
Kim Foley (Mid-Continent Conference/ Northeast Conference) (1996–2002)
1996–97	Kim Foley	2–23			
CCSU (Northeast Conference) (1997–Present)
1997–98	Kim Foley	17–10			
1998–99	Kim Foley	11–16			
1999–2000	Kim Foley	8–19			
2000–01	Kim Foley	14–13			
2001–02	Kim Foley	4–23			
Kim Foley:		56–104			
Yvette Harris (Northeast Conference) (2002–2007)
2002–03	Yvette Harris	8–20			
2003–04	Yvette Harris	4–23			
2004–05	Yvette Harris	9–19			
2005–06	Yvette Harris	9–20			
2006–07	Yvette Harris	6–23			
Yvette Harris:		36–105			
Beryl Piper (Northeast Conference) (2007–2020)
2007–08	Beryl Piper	4–25	3–15		
2008–09	Beryl Piper	18–14	12–6		WNIT First Round
2009–10	Beryl Piper	12–18	8–10		
2010–11	Beryl Piper	19–11	11–8		
2011–12	Beryl Piper	13–16	7–11		
2012–13	Beryl Piper	16–14	10–8	T–4th	
2013–14	Beryl Piper	11–17	5–13	9th	
2014–15	Beryl Piper	19–13	14–4	T–1st	WNIT First Round
2015–16	Beryl Piper	12–18	9–9	4th	
2016–17	Beryl Piper	11–20	9–9	6th	
2017–18	Beryl Piper	7–23	7–11	T–8th	
2018–19	Beryl Piper	7–21	4–14	9th	
2019–20	Beryl Piper	4–25	3–15	11th	
Beryl Piper:		153–235	103–134		
Kerri Reaves (Northeast Conference) (2020–2023)
2020–21	Kerri Reaves	4-14	4-14	10th	
2021–22	Kerri Reaves	6-20	4-12	10th	
2022–23	Kerri Reaves	7–22	3–13	9th	
Kerri Reaves:		17–56	11–39		
Way Veney (Northeast Conference) (2023–2025)
2023–24	Way Veney	9–21	7–9	5th	
2024–25	Way Veney	11–19	10–6	3rd	
Way Veney:		20–40	17–15		
Total:					
National champion Postseason invitational champion Conference regular season champion Conference regular season and conference tournament champion Division regular season champion Division regular season and conference tournament champion Conference tournament champion

== Postseason ==
=== NCAA Division II tournament results ===
The Blue Devils made one appearance in the NCAA Division II women's basketball tournament. They had a combined record of 1–1.

Year	Round	Opponent	Result
1986	Regional Finals; Elite Eight	Quinnipiac; Philadelphia Textile	W, 87–63; L, 66–84

=== WNIT results ===
Year	Round	Opponent	Result
2009	First Round	Boston University	L 60–79
2015	First Round	Fordham	L 67–70
