= Mount St. Mary's Mountaineers women's basketball =

Women's college basketball team

Mount St. Mary's Mountaineers
2025–26 Mount St. Mary's Mountaineers women's basketball team
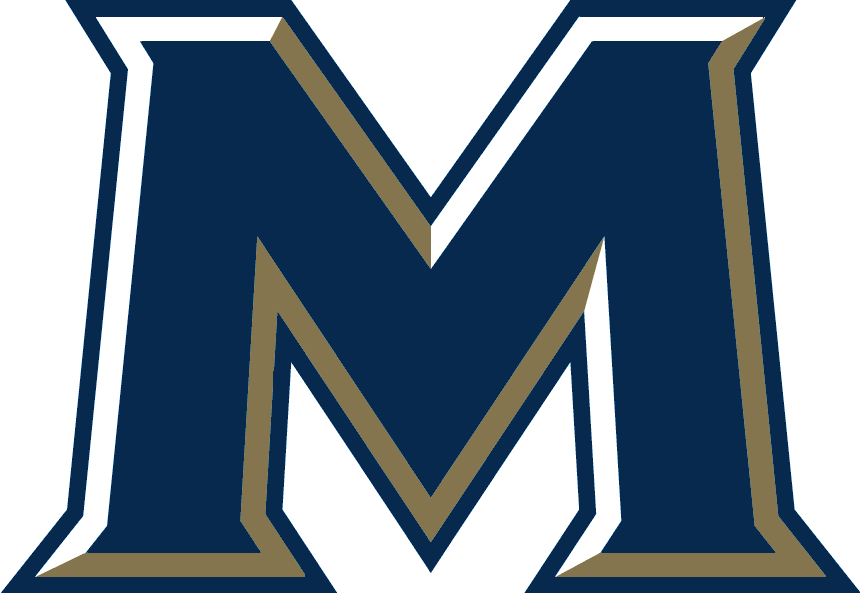
- University: Mount St. Mary's University
- Head coach: Antoine White (6th season)
- Location: Emmitsburg, Maryland
- Arena: Knott Arena (capacity: 3,121)
- Conference: Metro Atlantic Athletic Conference
- Nickname: Mountaineers
- Colors: Blue and white

NCAA Division I tournament Final Four
- 1982*
Other NCAA Division I tournament results
Elite Eight	1982*
Sweet Sixteen	1982*
Appearances	1982*, 1983*, 1984*, 1985*, 1986*, 1987*, 1988*, 1994, 1995, 2021, 2022

Conference tournament champions
- Mason-Dixon: 1985, 1986, 1987, 1988; Northeast Conference: 1993, 1994, 1995, 2021, 2022

Conference regular-season champions
- 1990, 1991, 1992, 1993, 1994, 1995, 1996, 1999, 2001, 2021

Uniforms
Home	Away
- * at the Division II level

The Mount St. Mary's Mountaineers women's basketball team represents Mount St. Mary's University in Emmitsburg, Maryland, United States. The school competes in the Metro Atlantic Athletic Conference. They play their home games at Knott Arena.

== History ==
Mount St. Mary's began play in 1974. The Mountaineers finished 3rd in the 1982 Division II Tournament, beating Virginia Union 71–51 and Norfolk State 82–64 before losing to California Poly-Pomona 71–58 but beating Oakland 73–62 to finish 3rd. The Mountaineers joined Division I in 1988 and joined the Northeast Conference the next year. Previously they had played in the Mason-Dixon Conference. They won the Northeast Conference women's basketball tournament five times. As of the end of the 2015–16 season, the Mountaineers have an all-time record of 702–467. In their two NCAA Division I Tournament appearances, they lost each time in the First Round, losing 70–47 to Iowa in 1994 and 82–55 to Alabama in 1995. Since then, Mount St. Mary's has only reached the postseason once, reaching the WNIT in 2014.

== Postseason results ==
The Mountaineers have an 0–4 record in four NCAA Tournament appearances at the Division I level.

=== NCAA Division I tournament results ===
Year	Seed	Round	Opponent	Result
1994	#14	First Round	#3 Iowa	L, 47–70
1995	#13	First Round	#4 Alabama	L, 55–82
2021	#15	First Round	#2 Maryland	L, 45–98
2022	#16	First Four	#16 Longwood	L 70–74

=== NCAA Division II tournament results ===
Year	Round	Opponent	Result
1982	First Round; Elite Eight; Semifinals; Third Place	Virginia Union; Norfolk State; Cal Poly Pomona; Oakland	W, 71–51; W, 82–62; L, 58–71; W, 73–62
1983	Regional Finals	Virginia Union	L, 79–88
1984	Regional Finals	Virginia Union	L, 58–59
1985	First Round; Regional Finals	Johnson C. Smith; Hampton	W, 77–59; L, 74–81
1986	Regional Finals	Hampton	L, 83–86
1987	First Round; Regional Finals	Virginia State; Hampton	W, 88–75; L, 65–80
1988	Regional Finals	Virginia State	L, 72–87
