= Wagner Seahawks women's basketball =

College Basketball Team

Wagner Seahawks
2025-26 Wagner Seahawks women's basketball team
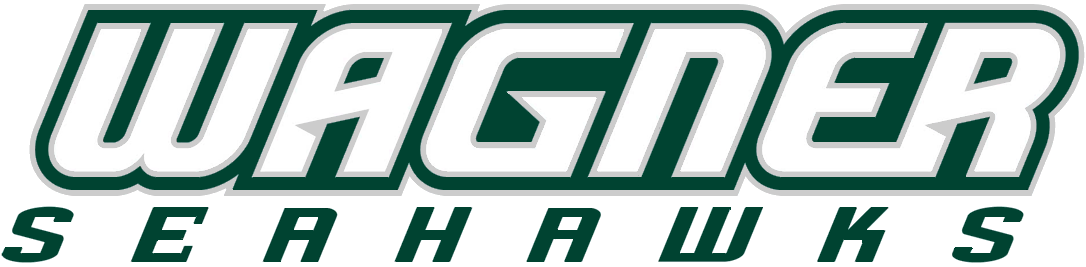
- University: Wagner College
- Head coach: Terrell Coburn (4th season)
- Location: Staten Island, New York
- Arena: Spiro Sports Center (capacity: 2,100)
- Conference: Northeast Conference
- Nickname: Seahawks
- Colors: Green and white

Conference tournament champions
- 1989

Conference regular-season champions
- 1989

The Wagner Seahawks women's basketball team represents Wagner College in Staten Island, New York, United States. The school's team currently competes in the Northeast Conference.

== History ==
Wagner began play in 1970. They have won the Northeast Conference title just once, in 1989. That year, they went 22-7 (14-2 in conference play), winning both the regular season and the tournament (66-60 over Robert Morris). The Seahawks have never qualified for a postseason tournament, neither Division I nor WNIT nor WBI. As of the end of the 2015-16 season, the Seahawks have an all-time record of 511-665.
