= LIU Brooklyn Blackbirds women's basketball =

LIU Brooklyn Blackbirds
- University: Long Island University
- First season: 1965 (folded in 2019; 7 years ago)
- Location: Brooklyn, New York
- Arena: Steinberg Wellness Center (capacity: 3,000)
- Conference: Northeast Conference
- Nickname: Blackbirds
- Colors: Black and silver

NCAA Division I tournament appearances
- 2001

Conference tournament champions
- 2001

Conference regular-season champions
- 2007

Uniforms
Home	Away

The LIU Brooklyn Blackbirds women's basketball team represented the Brooklyn campus of Long Island University, located in Brooklyn, New York in NCAA Division I basketball competition. They played their home games at the Steinberg Wellness Center, formerly known as the Wellness, Recreation & Athletics Center, and were members of the Northeast Conference (NEC).

At the end of the 2018–19 school year, LIU merged its two athletic programs—the Division I program of the Brooklyn campus and the NCAA Division II program of its Post campus in Nassau County, New York—into a single Division I program that now competes as the LIU Sharks. The Sharks maintain Brooklyn's Division I and NEC memberships.

== History ==
The Blackbirds began play in 1965. They have made one NCAA Tournament appearance (2001) and one WNIT appearance (2007), losing in the First Round each time, 101-29 to Connecticut and 91-79 to Iona, respectively.

== NCAA tournament results ==
Year	Seed	Round	Opponent	Result
2001	#16	First Round	#1 Connecticut	L 29-101
