= 2019–20 St. Francis Brooklyn Terriers women's basketball team =

Intercollegiate basketball season

2019–20 St. Francis Brooklyn Terriers women's basketball
- Conference: Northeast Conference
- Record: 8–21 (4–14 NEC)
- Head coach: Linda Cimino (2nd season)
- Associate head coach: Jennifer Leedham (1st season)
- Assistant coaches: Jessica Coscia (2nd season); Alyssa Ewing James (1st season)
- Home arena: Generoso Pope Athletic Complex

2019–20 Northeast Conference women's basketball standings
| | Conf. | | | | Overall |
| Team | W | | L | PCT | W | | L | PCT |
|---|---|---|---|---|---|---|---|---|
| Robert Morris | 17 | – | 1 | .944 | 22 | – | 7 | .759 |
| Mount St. Mary's | 14 | – | 4 | .778 | 19 | – | 11 | .633 |
| Merrimack* | 13 | – | 5 | .722 | 20 | – | 9 | .690 |
| Fairleigh Dickinson | 9 | – | 9 | .500 | 12 | – | 17 | .414 |
| Sacred Heart | 9 | – | 9 | .500 | 12 | – | 17 | .414 |
| Saint Francis (PA) | 9 | – | 9 | .500 | 11 | – | 18 | .379 |
| Wagner | 7 | – | 11 | .389 | 11 | – | 18 | .379 |
| Bryant | 7 | – | 11 | .389 | 9 | – | 20 | .310 |
| LIU | 7 | – | 11 | .389 | 8 | – | 21 | .276 |
| St. Francis Brooklyn | 4 | – | 14 | .222 | 8 | – | 21 | .276 |
| Central Connecticut | 3 | – | 15 | .167 | 4 | – | 25 | .138 |
† 2020 NEC tournament winner * Ineligible for NEC championship (reclassification from Division II); Rankings from AP poll

StFrancis Brooklyn Terriers Logo.

The 2019–20 St. Francis Brooklyn Terriers women's basketball team represented St. Francis College during the 2019–20 NCAA Division I women's basketball season. The Terrier's home games were played at the Generoso Pope Athletic Complex. The team has been a member of the Northeast Conference since 1988. St. Francis Brooklyn was coached by Linda Cimino, who was in her second year at the helm of the Terriers.

The Terriers finished the season at 8–21 overall, and 4–14 in conference play. They finished in 10th place and failed to qualify for the NEC Tournament.

== Previous season ==
The Terriers finished the 2018–19 season 18–13, 12–6 in NEC play. The Terriers proceeded to lose in the first round of the NEC tournament to Mount St. Mary's. Their 12 conference victories are the most in program history.

== Roster ==
2019–20 St. Francis Brooklyn Terriers women's basketball team
Players
Coaches

| Pos. | # | Name | Height | Year | Hometown |
|---|---|---|---|---|---|
| G | 23 | Jade Johnson (injured) (C) | 5 ft 9 in (1.75 m) | Sr | Adelaide, Australia |
| F | 31 | Ally Lassen (C) | 6 ft 1 in (1.85 m) | Jr | Point Pleasant, New Jersey |
| F | 22 | Abby Anderson (C) | 5 ft 11 in (1.8 m) | Jr | Scranton, Pennsylvania |
| G | 20 | Melody Van Ness | 5 ft 7 in (1.7 m) | Jr | Somerville, New Jersey |
| G | 14 | Marta Zori | 5 ft 8 in (1.73 m) | Jr | Badalona, Spain |
| F | 12 | Danae Barkley | 6 ft 2 in (1.88 m) | Jr | Newtown, Pennsylvania |
| G | 3 | Alyssa Fisher | 5 ft 7 in (1.7 m) | Fr | Baton Rouge, Louisiana |
| F | 33 | Jenna Jordan | 6 ft 1 in (1.85 m) | Fr | Valley Cottage, New York |
| G | 13 | Jada McMillan | 5 ft 7 in (1.7 m) | Fr | Concord, North Carolina |
| G | 10 | Cayln Richardson | 5 ft 6 in (1.68 m) | Fr | Orlando, Florida |
| G | 1 | Nevena Dimitrijevic | 5 ft 3 in (1.6 m) | Fr | Kragujevac, Serbia |

Head coach

- Linda Cimino (Adelphi '01)

Assistant coach(es)

- Jennifer Leedham (Franklin Pierce '09)
- Jessica Coscia (Caldwell '15)
- Alyssa Ewing James (Binghamton '17)

Legend

- (C) Team captain
- (S) Suspended
- (I) Ineligible
- (W) Walk-on
- Injured
- Current redshirt

Roster
Last update: October 29, 2019

== Schedule ==
| Date time, TV | Opponent | Result | Record | High points | High rebounds | High assists | Site (attendance) city, state |
Non-conference regular season
| November 5, 2019*; 7:00 pm | Stony Brook | L 73–86 | 0–1 | 21 – Johnson | 8 – Lassen | 7 – Dimitrijevic | Generoso Pope Athletic Complex (286); Brooklyn, NY |
| November 7, 2019*; 7:00 pm | at Marquette | L 71–92 | 0–2 | 24 – Lassen | 4 – Fisher, Lassen | 9 – Dimitrijevic | Al McGuire Center (782); Milwaukee, WI |
| November 10, 2019*; 2:00 pm | at Boston College | L 69–106 | 0–3 | 17 – Johnson | 6 – Johnson, Lassen | 7 – Dimitrijevic | Conte Forum (622); Chestnut Hill, MA |
| November 20, 2019*; 7:00 pm | Army | W 70–64 | 1–3 | 21 – Dimitrijevic | 9 – Jordan | 7 – Dimitrijevic | Generoso Pope Athletic Complex (327); Brooklyn, NY |
| November 24, 2019*; 1:00 pm | Loyola (MD) | W 89–78 | 2–3 | 25 – Johnson | 13 – Jordan | 6 – Richardson | Generoso Pope Athletic Complex (307); Brooklyn, NY |
| November 26, 2019*; 7:00 pm, ESPN+ | at NJIT | L 69–88 | 2–4 | 14 – Fisher | 8 – Jordan | 12 – Dimitrijevic | Fleisher Center (173); Newark, NJ |
| December 1, 2019*; 1:00 pm, ESPN+ | at Princeton | L 44–76 | 2–5 | 15 – Johnson | 8 – Johnson, Anderson | 4 – Dimitrijevic | Jadwin Gymnasium (702); Princeton, NJ |
| December 4, 2019*; 6:00 pm | East Stroudsburg | W 84–62 | 3–5 | 23 – Dimitrijevic | 8 – Jordan | 8 – Dimitrijevic | Generoso Pope Athletic Complex (172); Brooklyn, NY |
| December 14, 2019*; 2:00 pm, ESPN3 | at Albany | W 49–41 | 4–5 | 16 – Dimitrijevic | 11 – Lassen | 4 – Johnson | SEFCU Arena (761); Albany, NY |
| December 19, 2019*; 5:00 pm | vs. Pacific; Las Vegas Holiday Hoops Classic | L 62–71 | 4–6 | 23 – Johnson | 7 – Lassen | 9 – Dimitrijevic | South Point Hotel, Casino & Spa; Las Vegas, NV |
| December 20, 2019*; 2:30 pm | vs. Georgia Southern; Las Vegas Holiday Hoops Classic | L 47–78 | 4–7 | 14 – Dimitrijevic | 6 – Johnson | 2 – Johnson, Fisher | South Point Hotel, Casino & Spa (120); Las Vegas, NV |
Northeast Conference Regular Season
| January 2, 2020; 5:00 pm | Fairleigh Dickinson | L 57–62 | 4–8 (0–1) | 19 – Dimitrijevic | 8 – Dimitrijevic, Lassen | 2 – 3 tied | Generoso Pope Athletic Complex (216); Brooklyn, NY |
| January 8, 2020; 7:00 pm, SNY | LIU; Battle of Brooklyn | W 88–63 | 5–8 (1–1) | 25 – Johnson | 9 – Johnson, Dimitrijevic | 15 – Dimitrijevic | Generoso Pope Athletic Complex (416); Brooklyn, NY |
| January 11, 2020; 4:00 pm | at Saint Francis (PA) | L 72–82 | 5–9 (1–2) | 24 – Dimitrijevic | 4 – Lassen | 8 – Dimitrijevic | DeGol Arena (605); Loretto, PA |
| January 13, 2020; 7:00 pm | at Robert Morris | L 44–69 | 5–10 (1–3) | 15 – Lassen | 6 – Johnson | 5 – Dimitrijevic | UPMC Events Center (323); Pittsburgh, PA |
| January 18, 2020; 1:00 pm | at Wagner | L 66–74 | 5–11 (1–4) | 19 – Lassen | 6 – Lassen, Jordan | 4 – Fisher, Dimitrijevic | Spiro Sports Center (483); Staten Island, NY |
| January 20, 2020; 4:00 pm | at Mount St. Mary's | L 60–69 | 5–12 (1–5) | 27 – Lassen | 8 – Lassen | 5 – Dimitrijevic | Knott Arena (350); Emmitsburg, MD |
| January 25, 2020; 1:00 pm | Saint Francis (PA) | L 59–67 | 5–13 (1–6) | 15 – Dimitrijevic | 5 – Jordan, Dimitrijevic | 6 – Dimitrijevic | Generoso Pope Athletic Complex (251); Brooklyn, NY |
| January 27, 2020; 7:00 pm | Robert Morris | L 59–70 | 5–14 (1–7) | 16 – Lassen | 6 – Dimitrijevic | 6 – Dimitrijevic | Generoso Pope Athletic Complex (205); Brooklyn, NY |
| February 1, 2020; 1:00 pm | Sacred Heart | W 71–70 | 6–14 (2–7) | 30 – Lassen | 6 – Fisher, Dimitrijevic | 9 – Dimitrijevic | Generoso Pope Athletic Complex (324); Brooklyn, NY |
| February 3, 2020; 7:00 pm | at Merrimack | L 54–80 | 6–15 (2–8) | 25 – Anderson | 13 – Anderson | 6 – Dimitrijevic | Merrimack Athletics Complex (344); North Andover, MA |
| February 8, 2020; 1:00 pm | Mount St. Mary's | L 62–67 | 6–16 (2–9) | 16 – Jordan | 13 – Jordan | 4 – Dimitrijevic | Generoso Pope Athletic Complex (312); Brooklyn, NY |
| February 10, 2020; 7:00 pm | at Bryant | L 59–78 | 6–17 (2–10) | 31 – Dimitrijevic | 6 – Anderson | 5 – Dimitrijevic | Chace Athletic Center (654); Smithfield, RI |
| February 15, 2020; 2:00 pm | at LIU | W 71–54 | 7–17 (3–10) | 14 – Fisher, Dimitrijevic | 13 – Anderson | 9 – Dimitrijevic | Steinberg Wellness Center (511); Brooklyn, NY |
| February 21, 2020; 5:00 pm | Bryant | W 80–77 | 8–17 (4–10) | 27 – Dimitrijevic | 10 – Anderson | 9 – Dimitrijevic | Generoso Pope Athletic Complex (317); Brooklyn, NY |
| February 23, 2020; 1:00 pm | Wagner | L 53–74 | 8–18 (4–11) | 15 – Lassen | 8 – Lassen | 3 – Dimitrijevic | Generoso Pope Athletic Complex (241); Brooklyn, NY |
| February 29, 2020; 1:00 pm | at Sacred Heart | L 63–84 | 8–19 (4–12) | 20 – Dimitrijevic | 11 – Jordan | 4 – Dimitrijevic | William H. Pitt Center (282); Fairfield, CT |
| March 2, 2020; 7:00 pm | Merrimack | L 54–72 | 8–20 (4–13) | 19 – Anderson | 12 – Lassen | 5 – Dimitrijevic | Generoso Pope Athletic Complex (243); Brooklyn, NY |
| March 5, 2020; 7:00 pm | at Central Connecticut | L 54–75 | 8–21 (4–14) | 14 – Lassen | 7 – Anderson | 3 – Richardson | William H. Detrick Gymnasium (789); New Britain, CT |
*Non-conference game. ^{#}Rankings from AP Poll,. (#) Tournament seedings in parentheses. All times are in Eastern Time..

== Awards ==
- Nevena Dimitrijevic

1x NEC Player of the Week
7x NEC Rookie of the Week
NEC Rookie of the Year Award
Selected to All-NEC Rookie Team

- Ally Lassen

Selected to All-NEC Third Team

== See also ==
- 2019–20 St. Francis Brooklyn Terriers men's basketball team
