= 2019–20 Northeast Conference women's basketball season =

- League: NCAA Division I
- Sport: Basketball
- Number of teams: 11
- TV partner(s): NEC Front Row, ESPN2, MSG, FCS, Regional Sports Networks

WNBA Draft

Regular season
- First place: Robert Morris
- Season MVP: Denia Davis-Stewart, MER

NEC tournament

Northeast Conference women's basketball seasons
- ← 2018–19 2020–21 →

2019–20 Northeast Conference women's basketball standings
	Conf.				Overall
Team	W		L	PCT	W		L	PCT
Robert Morris	17	–	1	.944	22	–	7	.759
Mount St. Mary's	14	–	4	.778	19	–	11	.633
Merrimack*	13	–	5	.722	20	–	9	.690
Fairleigh Dickinson	9	–	9	.500	12	–	17	.414
Sacred Heart	9	–	9	.500	12	–	17	.414
Saint Francis (PA)	9	–	9	.500	11	–	18	.379
Wagner	7	–	11	.389	11	–	18	.379
Bryant	7	–	11	.389	9	–	20	.310
LIU	7	–	11	.389	8	–	21	.276
St. Francis Brooklyn	4	–	14	.222	8	–	21	.276
Central Connecticut	3	–	15	.167	4	–	25	.138
† 2020 NEC tournament winner * Ineligible for NEC championship (reclassification from Division II); Rankings from AP poll

The 2019–20 NEC women's basketball season will begin with practices in October 2019, followed by the start of the 2019–20 NCAA Division I women's basketball season in November. Conference play will start in January 2020 and concluded in March with the 2020 Northeast Conference women's basketball tournament.

== Changes from last season ==
Merrimack College joined the Northeast Conference from Division II Northeast-10 Conference. They are not eligible this year for the NEC tournament.

On October 3, 2018 Long Island University announced that it would combine its two existing athletic programs—NEC member LIU Brooklyn and the Division II program at LIU Post—into a single Division I program under the LIU name. The new LIU program, to be nicknamed Sharks, will maintain LIU Brooklyn's existing memberships in Division I and the NEC.

== Head coaches ==
Note: Stats shown are before the beginning of the season. All numbers are from time at current school.

Team	Head coach	Previous school	Seasons at school	Overall record
Bryant	Mary Burke	Bryant	29	401–412
Central Connecticut	Beryl Piper	Central Connecticut	12	149–210
Fairleigh Dickinson	Angelika Szumilo	LIU	1	12–17
LIU	Rene Haynes	Duke (assistant)	1	8–22
Merrimack	Kelly Morrone	John Carroll	1	20–9
Mount St. Mary's	Maria Marchesano	IUPUI	2	24–36
Robert Morris	Charlie Buscaglia	Robert Morris	3	69–30
Sacred Heart	Jessica Mannetti	Hofstra	6	98–88
St. Francis Brooklyn	Linda Cimino	Binghamton	2	18–13
Saint Francis (PA)	Keila Whittington	Marist	1	11–19
Wagner	Heather Jacobs	Adelphi	4	20–68

== Preseason ==
=== Rankings ===
	NEC Coaches Poll
1.	Robert Morris (10)
2.	Saint Francis (PA)
3.	Mount St. Mary's
	Sacred Heart
5.	Bryant
	St. Francis Brooklyn
7.	Wagner
8.	LIU
9.	Fairleigh Dickinson
10.	Central Connecticut
11.	Merrimack

() first place votes

=== Preseason All-NEC team ===
Recipient	School
Nneka Ezeigbo	Robert Morris
Sydney Holloway	Bryant
Jade Johnson	St. Francis Brooklyn
Brandy Thomas	LIU
Adrianne Hagood	Sacred Heart

== NEC regular season ==
=== Weekly awards ===
Throughout the regular season, the Northeast Conference offices named player(s) of the week and rookie(s) of the week.

Week	Player of the week	Rookie of the week
November 11, 2019	Denia Davis-Stewart, MER	Alex Cowan, WAG
November 18, 2019	Emilija Kirsta Grava, WAG	Nicole Gallagher, BRY
November 25, 2019	Nevena Dimitrijevic, SFBK	Nevena Dimitrijevic, SFBK
December 2, 2019	Nneka Ezeigbo, RMU	Aryna Taylor, MSM
December 9, 2019	Kendall Bresee, MSM	Nevena Dimitrijevic (2), SFBK
December 16, 2019	Denia Davis-Stewart (2), MER	Nevena Dimitrijevic (3), SFBK
December 23, 2019	Lauren Francillon, FDU	Maria Roters, FDU
December 30, 2019	Denia Davis-Stewart (3), MER	Alana Fursman, MER
January 6, 2020	Nneka Ezeigbo (2), RMU	Sonia Smith, SHU
January 15, 2020	Denia Davis-Stewart (4), MER	Nevena Dimitrijevic (4), SFBK
January 22, 2020	Isabella Posset, RMU	Maria Roters (2), FDU
January 29, 2020	Brandy Thomas, LIU; Emilija Krista Grava (2), WAG	Katie Dettwiller, SFU
February 5, 2020	Brandy Thomas (2), LIU	Aniya Bell FDU; Jayme Decesare MER
February 12, 2020	Irekpitan Ozzy-Momodu, RMU	Nevena Dimitrijevic (5), SFBK
February 19, 2020	Nneka Ezeigbo (3), RMU	Sonia Smith (2), SHU
February 25, 2020	Denia Davis-Stewart (5), MER	Nevena Dimitrijevic (6), SFBK
March 4, 2020	Denia Davis-Stewart (6), MER; Nneka Ezeigbo (4), RMU	Nevena Dimitrijevic (7), SFBK

School	Player of the week Awards	Rookie of the week Awards
Bryant	0	1
Central Connecticut	0	0
Fairleigh Dickinson	1	3
LIU	2	0
Merrimack	6	2
Mount St. Mary's	1	1
Robert Morris	6	0
Sacred Heart	0	2
St. Francis Brooklyn	1	7
Saint Francis (PA)	0	1
Wagner	2	1

=== All-NEC honors and awards ===
Following the regular season, the conference selected outstanding performers based on a poll of league coaches.

Honor	Recipient
Player of the Year	Denia Davis-Stewart, MER
Coach of the Year	Charlie Buscaglia, RMU
Defensive Player of the Year	Denia Davis-Stewart, MER
Rookie of the Year	Nevena Dimitrijevic, SFBK
Most Improved Player of the Year	Rachael Niles, FDU
All-NEC First Team	Nneka Ezeigbo, RMU
All-NEC First Team	Denia Davis-Stewart, MER
All-NEC First Team	Emilija Krista Grava, WAG
All-NEC First Team	Michaela Harrison, MSM
All-NEC First Team	Brandy Thomas, LIU
All-NEC Second Team	Nevena Dimitrijevic, SFBK
All-NEC Second Team	Lauren Francillon, FDU
All-NEC Second Team	Adrianne Hagood, SHU
All-NEC Second Team	Sydney Holloway, BRY
All-NEC Second Team	Irekpitan Ozzy-Momodu, RMU
All-NEC Third Team	Ally Lassen, SFBK
All-NEC Third Team	Kendall Bresee, MSM
All-NEC Third Team	Kate Mager, MER
All-NEC Third Team	Isabella Posset, RMU
All-NEC Third Team	Karson Swogger, SFPA
All-NEC Rookie Team	Nevena Dimitrijevic, SFBK
All-NEC Rookie Team	Jayme Decesare, MER
All-NEC Rookie Team	Nicole Gallagher, BRY
All-NEC Rookie Team	Maria Roters, FDU
All-NEC Rookie Team	Sonia Smith, SHU

== Postseason ==
=== NEC tournament ===
In the NEC tournament the top eight teams from the field of eleven participate. The teams are seeded according to their conference records, and when there are similar records between teams, tie-breakers are applied. After the first round, teams are reseeded after each round, with highest remaining seeds receiving home court advantage.

Quarterfinals; Monday, March 9 NEC Front Row
1	Robert Morris
8	Wagner
2	Mount St. Mary's
7	LIU
(Pairings are reseeded after the first round)
3	Fairleigh Dickinson
6	Bryant
4	Saint Francis (PA)
5	Sacred Heart

Semifinals; Thursday, March 12; ESPN3

Championship; Sunday, March 15; ESPNU

=== NCAA tournament ===
Seed	Region	School	First Four	1st round	2nd round	Sweet 16	Elite Eight	Final Four	Championship
		TBD							

== See also ==
2019–20 Northeast Conference men's basketball season
