= 2018–19 Robert Morris Colonials women's basketball team =

American college basketball season

2018–19 Robert Morris Colonials women's basketball

Northeast Conference regular season and Tournament Champions

NCAA tournament, first round
- Conference: Northeast Conference
- Record: 22–11 (16–2 NEC)
- Head coach: Charlie Buscaglia (3rd season)
- Assistant coaches: Scott Schneider; Asami Morita
- Home arena: North Athletic Complex

2018–19 Northeast Conference women's basketball standings
	Conf.				Overall
Team	W		L	PCT	W		L	PCT
Robert Morris †	16	–	2	.889	22	–	11	.667
Sacred Heart	14	–	4	.778	19	–	13	.594
St. Francis Brooklyn	12	–	6	.667	18	–	13	.581
Saint Francis (PA)	11	–	7	.611	16	–	17	.485
Bryant	9	–	9	.500	11	–	19	.367
Mount St. Mary's	8	–	10	.444	15	–	16	.484
Wagner	8	–	10	.444	10	–	20	.333
Fairleigh Dickinson	5	–	13	.278	8	–	22	.267
Central Connecticut	4	–	14	.222	7	–	21	.250
LIU Brooklyn	3	–	15	.167	4	–	25	.138
† 2019 NEC tournament winner As of March 16, 2019; Rankings from AP poll

The 2018–19 Robert Morris Colonials women's basketball team represented Robert Morris University during the 2018–19 NCAA Division I women's basketball season. The Colonials, led by third-year head coach Charlie Buscaglia, played their home games at the North Athletic Complex, as members of the Northeast Conference. They finished the season 22–11, 16–2 in Northeast Conference play to win the Northeast Conference regular season title. They won the Northeast women's tournament and earned an automatic place in the NCAA women's tournament, where they lost to Louisville in the first round.

== Roster ==
2018–19 Robert Morris Colonials women's basketball team
Players
Coaches

Pos.	#	Name	Height	Year	Previous school	Hometown
G	2	Nia Adams	5 ft 11 in (1.8 m)	Sr	Paterson Eastside	Paterson, NJ
G	4	Isabella Posset	5 ft 8 in (1.73 m)	Fr	Beaver	Beaver, PA
G	10	Laura Carrasco	5 ft 9 in (1.75 m)	So	Colegio Legamar	Madrid, Spain
G/F	11	Natalie Villaflor	5 ft 10 in (1.78 m)	Fr	Loudoun County	Ashburn, VA
G	12	Nina Augstin	5 ft 6 in (1.68 m)	Fr	Mäkelänrinteen lukio	Helsinki, Finland
G	13	Megan Callahan	5 ft 8 in (1.73 m)	So	Stonewall Jackson	Bristow, VA
C	14	Irekpitan Ozzy-Momodu	6 ft 2 in (1.88 m)	So	Southwark	London, England
G	20	Honoka Ikematsu	5 ft 6 in (1.68 m)	So	Kumamoto Kokufu	Kumamoto, Japan
G	22	Esther Castedo	5 ft 7 in (1.7 m)	Fr	IDE Ollos Grandes	Lugo, Spain
F	24	Julia Chadwick	6 ft 1 in (1.85 m)	Fr	Henry Street	Ottawa, ON
F	32	Nadège Pluviose	6 ft 0 in (1.83 m)	Jr	Collège Montmorency	Montreal, QC
C	33	Nneka Ezeigbo	6 ft 2 in (1.88 m)	Jr	Notre Dame	Ewing, NJ
G	50	Shakema Dashiell	5 ft 9 in (1.75 m)	RS Sr	Mardela	Salisburg, MD

Head coach

- Charlie Buscaglia (Manhattan)

Assistant coach(es)

- Scott Schneider (Robert Morris)
- Asami Morita (Kansai)

Legend

- (C) Team captain
- (S) Suspended
- (I) Ineligible
- (W) Walk-on
- Injured
- Current redshirt

Roster

== Schedule and results ==
Date time, TV	Rank^{#}	Opponent^{#}	Result	Record	Site (attendance) city, state
Non-conference regular season
Nov 6, 2018*; 7:00 pm, ESPN+		at Youngstown State	L 59–69 ^{OT}	0–1	Beeghly Center (1,189); Youngstown, OH
Nov 11, 2018*; 12:00 pm		La Salle	W 67–39	1–1	North Athletic Complex (662); Moon Township, PA
Nov 13, 2018*; 7:30 pm		Rhode Island	L 41–46	1–2	North Athletic Complex (559); Moon Township, PA
Nov 17, 2018*; 12:00 pm, ESPN+		at Bowling Green	L 60–61	1–3	Stroh Center (1,384); Bowling Green, OH
Nov 23, 2018*; 3:30 pm		vs. SMU; LMU Thanksgiving Classic semifinals	L 55–60	1–4	Gersten Pavilion (201); Los Angeles, CA
Nov 24, 2018*; 3:30 pm		at Loyola Marymount; LMU Thanksgiving Classic consolation game	L 53–61	1–5	Gersten Pavilion (206); Los Angeles, CA
Dec 2, 2018*; 3:00 pm		at No. 14 Iowa	L 63–92	1–6	Carver–Hawkeye Arena (3,457); Iowa City, IA
Dec 7, 2018*; 7:00 pm		Kent State	L 46–54	1–7	North Athletic Complex (466); Moon Township, PA
Dec 15, 2018*; 12:00 pm		Pittsburgh–Johnstown	W 73–53	2–7	North Athletic Complex (503); Moon Township, PA
Dec 18, 2018*; 10:00 am		Delaware State	W 64–63	3–7	North Athletic Complex (1,016); Moon Township, PA
Dec 30, 2018*; 12:00 pm		James Madison	L 36–59	3–8	North Athletic Complex (418); Moon Township, PA
NEC regular season
Jan 5, 2019; 1:00 pm		Mount St. Mary's	W 70–58	4–8 (1–0)	North Athletic Complex (325); Moon Township, PA
Jan 7, 2019; 7:00 pm		Fairleigh Dickinson	W 71–49	5–8 (2–0)	North Athletic Complex (282); Moon Township, PA
Jan 12, 2019; 1:00 pm		at St. Francis Brooklyn	W 75–56	6–8 (3–0)	Generoso Pope Athletic Complex (271); Brooklyn, NY
Jan 14, 2019; 7:00 pm		at LIU Brooklyn	W 89–37	7–8 (4–0)	Steinberg Wellness Center (161); Brooklyn, NY
Jan 19, 2019; 1:00 pm		at Bryant	W 60–57	8–8 (5–0)	Chace Athletic Center (150); Smithfield, RI
Jan 21, 2019; 1:00 pm		at Central Connecticut	W 64–57	9–8 (6–0)	William H. Detrick Gymnasium (985); New Britain, CT
Jan 26, 2019; 1:00 pm		Wagner	W 69–46	10–8 (7–0)	North Athletic Complex (357); Moon Township, PA
Jan 28, 2019; 7:00 pm		Sacred Heart	W 64–46	11–8 (8–0)	North Athletic Complex (271); Moon Township, PA
Feb 2, 2019; 7:00 pm		at Fairleigh Dickinson	W 63–43	12–8 (9–0)	Rothman Center (126); Hackensack, NJ
Feb 9, 2019; 7:00 pm, ESPN3		Bryant	W 59–56	13–8 (10–0)	North Athletic Complex (599); Moon Township, PA
Feb 11, 2019; 7:00 pm		Central Connecticut	W 60–40	14–8 (11–0)	North Athletic Complex (467); Moon Township, PA
Feb 16, 2019; 1:00 pm		at Mount St. Mary's	L 55–61	14–9 (11–1)	Knott Arena (347); Emmitsburg, MD
Feb 18, 2019; 7:00 pm, ESPN3		at Saint Francis (PA)	W 66–60	15–9 (12–1)	DeGol Arena (602); Loretto, PA
Feb 23, 2019; 1:00 pm		St. Francis Brooklyn	W 71–49	16–9 (13–1)	North Athletic Complex (363); Moon Township, PA
Feb 25, 2019; 7:00 pm		LIU Brooklyn	W 71–54	17–9 (14–1)	North Athletic Complex (448); Moon Township, PA
Mar 2, 2019; 1:00 pm		at Wagner	W 77–57	18–9 (15–1)	Spiro Sports Center (347); Staten Island, NY
Mar 4, 2019; 6:00 pm		at Sacred Heart	L 45–54	18–10 (15–2)	William H. Pitt Center (207); Fairfield, CT
Mar 7, 2019; 6:00 pm		Saint Francis (PA)	W 66–53	19–10 (16–2)	North Athletic Complex (291); Moon Township, PA
NEC Women's Tournament
Mar 11, 2019; 7:30 pm	(1)	(8) Fairleigh Dickinson; Quarterfinals	W 64–38	20–10	North Athletic Complex (462); Moon Township, PA
Mar 14, 2019; 7:00 pm, ESPN3	(1)	(6) Mount St. Mary's; Semifinals	W 69–65	21–10	North Athletic Complex (518); Moon Township, PA
Mar 17, 2019; 12:00 pm, ESPNU	(1)	(4) Saint Francis (PA); Championship Game	W 65–54	22–10	North Athletic Complex (1,016); Moon Township, PA
NCAA Women's Tournament
Mar 22, 2019*; 12:00 pm, ESPN2	(16 A)	at (1 A) No. 5 Louisville; First Round	L 34–69	22–11	KFC Yum! Center (6,593); Louisville, KY
*Non-conference game. ^{#}Rankings from AP Poll. (#) Tournament seedings in parentheses. A=Albany Region. All times are in Eastern Time.

== See also ==
- 2018–19 Robert Morris Colonials men's basketball team
