= 2020 Northeast Conference women's basketball tournament =

- Classification: Division I
- Season: 2019–20
- Teams: 8
- Site: Campus sites
- Television: NEC Front Row, ESPN3

2019–20 Northeast Conference women's basketball standings
	Conf.				Overall
Team	W		L	PCT	W		L	PCT
Robert Morris	17	–	1	.944	22	–	7	.759
Mount St. Mary's	14	–	4	.778	19	–	11	.633
Merrimack*	13	–	5	.722	20	–	9	.690
Fairleigh Dickinson	9	–	9	.500	12	–	17	.414
Sacred Heart	9	–	9	.500	12	–	17	.414
Saint Francis (PA)	9	–	9	.500	11	–	18	.379
Wagner	7	–	11	.389	11	–	18	.379
Bryant	7	–	11	.389	9	–	20	.310
LIU	7	–	11	.389	8	–	21	.276
St. Francis Brooklyn	4	–	14	.222	8	–	21	.276
Central Connecticut	3	–	15	.167	4	–	25	.138
*Ineligible for NEC championship (reclassification from Division II)
† 2020 NEC tournament winner As of March 12, 2025; Rankings from AP poll

The 2020 Northeast Conference women's basketball tournament was the postseason women's basketball tournament for the Northeast Conference for the 2019–20 NCAA Division I women's basketball season. All tournament games were scheduled to be played at the home arena of the highest seed from March 9 through March 15, 2020. On March 12, the NCAA announced that the tournament was cancelled due to the coronavirus pandemic.

== Seeds ==
The top eight teams in the Northeast Conference are eligible to compete in the conference tournament. Teams were seeded by record within the conference, with a tiebreaker system to seed teams with identical conference records.

- Note: Merrimack College joined the Northeast Conference from Division II Northeast-10 Conference. They are not eligible this year for the NEC Tournament.

Seed	School	Conference	Tiebreaker	Tiebreaker 2
1	Robert Morris	17–1		
2	Mount St. Mary's	14–4		
DNQ	Merrimack	13–5		
3	Fairleigh Dickinson	9–9		
4	Saint Francis (PA)	9–9		
5	Sacred Heart	9–9		
6	Bryant	7–11		
7	LIU	7–11		
8	Wagner	7–11		
DNQ	St. Francis Brooklyn	4–14		
DNQ	Central Connecticut	3–15		

== Bracket and results ==
Quarterfinals; Monday, March 9 NEC Front Row
1	Robert Morris	65^{*}
8	Wagner	61
2	Mount St. Mary's	80
7	LIU	47
(Pairings are reseeded after the first round)
3	Fairleigh Dickinson	57
6	Bryant	43
4	Saint Francis (PA)	70
5	Sacred Heart	73

Semifinals^{#} Thursday, March 12; ESPN3/NEC Front Row
1	Robert Morris
5	Sacred Heart
2	Mount St Mary's
3	Fairleigh Dickinson

Championship^{#} Sunday, March 15; ESPNU

- ^{*} denotes overtime
- ^{#} denotes games cancelled due to COVID-19

== See also ==
- 2020 Northeast Conference men's basketball tournament
