= 2018–19 Northeast Conference women's basketball season =

- League: NCAA Division I
- Sport: Basketball
- Number of teams: 10
- TV partner(s): NEC Front Row, ESPN2, MSG, FCS, Regional Sports Networks

WNBA Draft

Regular season
- First place: Robert Morris
- Runners-up: Sacred Heart
- Season MVP: Jessica Kovatch (SFPA)

NEC tournament
- Champions: Robert Morris
- Runners-up: Saint Francis (PA)
- Finals MVP: Nneka Ezeigbo (RMU)

Northeast Conference women's basketball seasons
- ← 2017–18 2019–20 →

2018–19 Northeast Conference women's basketball standings
	Conf.				Overall
Team	W		L	PCT	W		L	PCT
Robert Morris †	16	–	2	.889	22	–	11	.667
Sacred Heart	14	–	4	.778	19	–	13	.594
St. Francis Brooklyn	12	–	6	.667	18	–	13	.581
Saint Francis (PA)	11	–	7	.611	16	–	17	.485
Bryant	9	–	9	.500	11	–	19	.367
Mount St. Mary's	8	–	10	.444	15	–	16	.484
Wagner	8	–	10	.444	10	–	20	.333
Fairleigh Dickinson	5	–	13	.278	8	–	22	.267
Central Connecticut	4	–	14	.222	7	–	21	.250
LIU Brooklyn	3	–	15	.167	4	–	25	.138
† 2019 NEC tournament winner As of March 16, 2019; Rankings from AP poll

The 2018–19 NEC women's basketball season began with practices in October 2018, followed by the start of the 2018–19 NCAA Division I women's basketball season in November. Conference play started in January 2019 and concluded in March with the 2019 Northeast Conference women's basketball tournament.

== Preseason ==
=== Rankings ===
	NEC Coaches Poll
1.	Robert Morris (5)
2.	Saint Francis (PA) (2)
3.	Sacred Heart (3)
4.	Bryant
5.	St. Francis Brooklyn
5.	Mount St. Mary's
7.	LIU Brooklyn
8.	Central Connecticut
9.	Fairleigh Dickinson
10.	Wagner

() first place votes

=== Preseason All-NEC team ===
Recipient	School
Nneka Ezeigbo	Robert Morris
Sydney Holloway	Bryant
Jade Johnson	St. Francis Brooklyn
Jessica Kovatch	Saint Francis (PA)
Kiana Patterson	Central Connecticut

== Head coaches ==
Note: Stats shown are before the beginning of the season. All numbers are from time at current school.

Team	Head coach	Previous school	Seasons at school	Overall record
Bryant	Mary Burke	Bryant	28	390–393
Central Connecticut	Beryl Piper	Central Connecticut	11	142–189
Fairleigh Dickinson	Melissa Brooks	Army	0	0–0
LIU Brooklyn	Stephanie Del Preore	Seton Hall	3	28–62
Mount St. Mary's	Maria Marchesano	IUPUI	1	9–20
Robert Morris	Charlie Buscaglia	Robert Morris	2	47–19
Sacred Heart	Jessica Mannetti	Hofstra	5	79–71
St. Francis Brooklyn	Linda Cimino	Binghamton	0	0–0
Saint Francis (PA)	Susan Robinson Fruchtl	Saint Francis (PA)		
Wagner	Heather Jacobs	Adelphi	2	10–48

== NEC regular season ==
=== Player of the week ===
Throughout the regular season, the Northeast Conference offices named player(s) of the week and rookie(s) of the week.

Week	Player of the week	Rookie of the week
November 12, 2018	Sydney Holloway, BRY	Brandy Thomas, LIU
November 19, 2018	Katherine Haines, SHU; Jade Johnson, SFBK	Emilija Krista Grava, WAG
November 26, 2018	Michaela Harrison, MSM	Michaela Harrison, MSM
December 3, 2018	Juliette Lawless, MSM	Brandy Thomas (2), LIU
December 10, 2018	Kiana Patterson, CCSU	Michaela Harrison (2), MSM
December 17, 2018	Kiana Patterson (2), CCSU	Michaela Harrison (3), MSM
December 24, 2018	Jessica Kovatch, SFU	Isabella Posset, RMU
December 31, 2018	Sydney Holloway (2), BRY	Brandy Thomas (3), LIU
January 7, 2019	Jessica Kovatch (2), SFU	Isabella Posset (2), RMU
January 14, 2019	Katherine Haines (2), SHU	Esther Castedo, RMU
January 21, 2019	Katherine Haines (3), SHU	Michaela Harrison (4), MSM
January 28, 2019	Jessica Kovatch (3), SFU; Juliette Lawless, MSM	Michaela Harrison (5), MSM
February 4, 2019	Jessica Kovatch (4), SFU; Amy O'Neill, SFBK	Michaela Harrison (6), MSM
February 11, 2019	Jessica Kovatch (4), SFU; Taylah Simmons, WAG	Brandy Thomas (4), LIU
February 18, 2019	Jade Johnson (2), SFBK	Brandy Thomas (5), LIU
February 27, 2019	Nneka Ezeigbo, RMU	Brandy Thomas (6), LIU; Michaela Harrison (7), MSM
March 6, 2019	Katherine Haines (3), SHU; Amy O'Neill (2), SFBK	Ebony Horton, SFBK

== Postseason ==
=== NEC tournament ===
- March 11–17, 2019, Northeast Conference Basketball Tournament.

Quarterfinals; Monday, March 11; NEC Front Row
1	Robert Morris	64
8	Fairleigh Dickinson	38
4	Saint Francis (PA)	91
5	Bryant	78
2	Sacred Heart	68
7	Wagner	51
3	St. Francis Brooklyn	74
6	Mount St. Mary's	80

Semifinals; Thursday, March 14; ESPN3
1	Robert Morris	69
6	Mount Saint Mary's	65
2	Sacred Heart	60
4	Saint Francis (PA)	68

Championship; Sunday, March 17; ESPNU
1	Robert Morris	65
4	Saint Francis (PA)	54

All games will be played at the venue of the higher seed

=== NCAA tournament ===
Seed	Region	School	1st round	2nd round	Sweet 16	Elite Eight	Final Four	Championship
16	Albany	Robert Morris	34–69 vs. (#1) Louisville – (Louisville, KY)					

=== National Invitational tournament ===
School	1st round	2nd round	Quarterfinals	Semifinals	Championship
Sacred Heart	59–90 at. Georgetown – (Washington, D.C.)				

== All-NEC honors and awards ==
Following the regular season, the conference selected outstanding performers based on a poll of league coaches.

Honor	Recipient
Player of the Year	Jessica Kovatch, SFPA
Coach of the Year	Charlie Buscaglia, RMU
Defensive Player of the Year	Nneka Ezeigbo, RMU
Rookie of the Year	Brandy Thomas, LIU
Most Improved Player of the Year	Taylah Simmons, WAG
All-NEC First Team	Nneka Ezeigbo, RMU
All-NEC First Team	Katherine Haines, SHU
All-NEC First Team	Sydney Holloway, BRY
All-NEC First Team	Jessica Kovatch, SFPA
All-NEC First Team	Amy O’Neill, SFBK
All-NEC Second Team	Jade Johnson, SFBK
All-NEC Second Team	Juliette Lawless, MSM
All-NEC Second Team	Candice Leatherwood, SHU
All-NEC Second Team	Kiana Patterson, CCSU
All-NEC Second Team	Taylah Simmons, WAG
All-NEC Third Team	Adrianne Hagood, SHU
All-NEC Third Team	Jeydah Johnson, LIU
All-NEC Third Team	Erin Storck, SHU
All-NEC Third Team	Brandy Thomas, LIU
All-NEC Third Team	Haley Thomas, SFPA
All-NEC Rookie Team	Emilja Krista Grava, WAG
All-NEC Rookie Team	Michaela Harrison, MSM
All-NEC Rookie Team	Ebony Horton, SFBK
All-NEC Rookie Team	Isabella Posset, RMU
All-NEC Rookie Team	Brandy Thomas, LIU

== See also ==
2018–19 Northeast Conference men's basketball season
