= 2019–20 Central Connecticut Blue Devils women's basketball team =

Intercollegiate basketball season

2019–20 Central Connecticut Blue Devils women's basketball
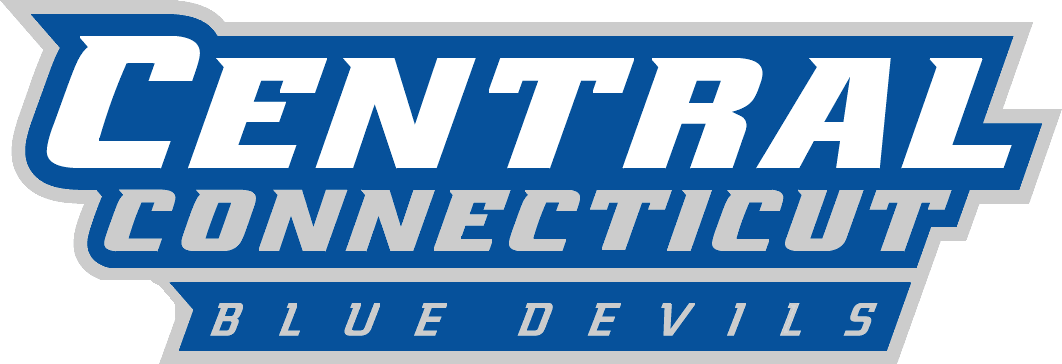
- Conference: Northeast Conference
- Record: 4–25 (3–15 NEC)
- Head coach: Beryl Piper (13th season)
- Assistant coaches: Kerri Reaves; Jason Marshall; Andrew Stephens
- Home arena: William H. Detrick Gymnasium

2019–20 Northeast Conference women's basketball standings
| | Conf. | | | | Overall |
| Team | W | | L | PCT | W | | L | PCT |
|---|---|---|---|---|---|---|---|---|
| Robert Morris | 17 | – | 1 | .944 | 22 | – | 7 | .759 |
| Mount St. Mary's | 14 | – | 4 | .778 | 19 | – | 11 | .633 |
| Merrimack* | 13 | – | 5 | .722 | 20 | – | 9 | .690 |
| Fairleigh Dickinson | 9 | – | 9 | .500 | 12 | – | 17 | .414 |
| Sacred Heart | 9 | – | 9 | .500 | 12 | – | 17 | .414 |
| Saint Francis (PA) | 9 | – | 9 | .500 | 11 | – | 18 | .379 |
| Wagner | 7 | – | 11 | .389 | 11 | – | 18 | .379 |
| Bryant | 7 | – | 11 | .389 | 9 | – | 20 | .310 |
| LIU | 7 | – | 11 | .389 | 8 | – | 21 | .276 |
| St. Francis Brooklyn | 4 | – | 14 | .222 | 8 | – | 21 | .276 |
| Central Connecticut | 3 | – | 15 | .167 | 4 | – | 25 | .138 |
† 2020 NEC tournament winner * Ineligible for NEC championship (reclassification from Division II); Rankings from AP poll

The 2019–20 Central Connecticut Blue Devils women's basketball team represented Central Connecticut State University during the 2019–20 NCAA Division I women's basketball season. The Blue Devils were led by thirteenth-year head coach Beryl Piper, and played their home games at the William H. Detrick Gymnasium in New Britain, Connecticut as members of the Northeast Conference (NEC). They finished the season 4–25 overall, 3–15 in NEC play, to finish in ninth place. They failed to qualify for the NEC women's tournament. On March 12, the NCAA announced that all tournaments were cancelled due to the coronavirus pandemic.

== Roster ==
2019–20 Central Connecticut Blue Devils women's basketball team
Players
Coaches

| Pos. | # | Name | Height | Year | Previous school | Hometown |
|---|---|---|---|---|---|---|
| G | 1 | Forever Toppin | 5 ft 8 in (1.73 m) | So | Sinai Christian Academy | Paterson, NJ |
| G | 2 | Taylor Goode | 5 ft 7 in (1.7 m) | RS Jr | St. Anthony's | Holbrook, NY |
| G | 5 | Bruna Vila Artigues | 5 ft 6 in (1.68 m) | Sr | INS Tres Turons | Arenys de Munt, Spain |
| G | 11 | Dejah Jenkins | 5 ft 7 in (1.7 m) | Jr | Cathedral High School | Dorchester, MA |
| F | 12 | Jewel Porter | 6 ft 1 in (1.85 m) | Jr | Harford Community College | Baltimore, MD |
| G/F | 14 | Ashley Forker | 5 ft 10 in (1.78 m) | Jr | Faith Christian Academy | Telford, PA |
| G | 15 | Emma McCamus | 5 ft 7 in (1.7 m) | Jr | Bill Crothers Secondary | Cavan, ON |
| F | 20 | Jamey Napoleon | 6 ft 0 in (1.83 m) | Fr | Mount Lebanon High School | Pittsburgh, PA |
| F | 21 | Claire Sutherland Case | 6 ft 1 in (1.85 m) | Fr | Westdale Secondary | Hamilton, ON |
| F | 22 | Ashley Chin | 5 ft 8 in (1.73 m) | Sr | Dunarton | Pickering, ON |
| G/F | 23 | Danielle Delano | 5 ft 9 in (1.75 m) | So | Enfield | Enfield, CT |
| G/F | 24 | Angelique Rodriguez | 6 ft 0 in (1.83 m) | RS Jr | Capital Prep | New Britain, CT |
| C | 30 | Carly Reynolds | 6 ft 2 in (1.88 m) | So | Clarence | Williamsville, NY |
| F | 32 | Tiffany Slicklein | 5 ft 11 in (1.8 m) | Jr | Kings Park | Kings Park, NY |
| C | 33 | Ashley Berube | 6 ft 2 in (1.88 m) | Jr | Tilton | Londonderry, NH |

Head coach

- Beryl Piper (Central Connecticut State)

Assistant coach(es)

- Kerri Reaves (Marquette)
- Jason Marshall (Ramapo)
- Andrew Stephens

Legend

- (C) Team captain
- (S) Suspended
- (I) Ineligible
- (W) Walk-on
- Injured
- Current redshirt

Roster
Last update: September 16, 2024

== Schedule ==
| Date time, TV | Rank^{#} | Opponent^{#} | Result | Record | Site (attendance) city, state |
Non-conference regular season
| November 5, 2019*; 7:00 p.m., ESPN3 | | at Buffalo | L 56–61 | 0–1 | Alumni Arena; Buffalo, NY |
| November 11, 2019*; 7:00 p.m. | | at Pittsburgh | L 73–81 | 0–2 | Petersen Events Center; Pittsburgh, PA |
| November 14, 2019*; 7:00 p.m. | | Brown | L 73–83 | 0–3 | William H. Detrick Gymnasium; New Britain, CT |
| November 18, 2019*; 5:30 p.m. | | at Lehigh | L 51–70 | 0–4 | Stabler Arena; Bethlehem, PA |
| November 26, 2019*; 7:00 p.m. | | at Duquesne | L 33–72 | 0–5 | A. J. Palumbo Center; Pittsburgh, PA |
| December 1, 2019*; 3:00 p.m. | | Albany | L 63–73 | 0–6 | William H. Detrick Gymnasium; New Britain, CT |
| December 5, 2019*; 7:00 p.m. | | UMass Lowell | W 56–54 | 0–7 | William H. Detrick Gymnasium; New Britain, CT |
| December 8, 2019*; 1:00 p.m. | | at New Hampshire | L 59–70 | 0–8 | Lundholm Gym; Durham, NH |
| December 15, 2019*; 2:00 p.m. | | at Florida Atlantic | L 54–72 | 0–9 | FAU Arena; Boca Raton, FL |
| December 17, 2019*; 7:00 p.m., ESPN+ | | at Florida Gulf Coast | L 60–94 | 0–10 | Alico Arena; Fort Myers, FL |
| December 21, 2019*; 2:00 p.m., ESPN+ | | at Hartford; Rivalry | W 61–54 | 1–10 | Chase Arena at Reich Family Pavilion; West Hartford, CT |
NEC regular season
| January 2, 2020; 5:00 p.m. | | Robert Morris | W 86–56 | 1–11 | William H. Detrick Gymnasium; New Britain, CT |
| January 4, 2020; 1:00 p.m. | | Saint Francis | L 52–64 | 1–12 | William H. Detrick Gymnasium; New Britain, CT |
| January 8, 2020; 1:00 p.m. | | at Sacred Heart | L 58–66 | 1–13 | William H. Pitt Center; Fairfield, CT |
| January 11, 2020; 1:00 p.m. | | Merrimack | L 56–65 | 1–14 | William H. Detrick Gymnasium; New Britain, CT |
| January 13, 2020; 7:00 p.m. | | at LIU | L 61–63 | 1–15 | Steinberg Wellness Center; Brooklyn, NY |
| January 18, 2020; 1:00 p.m. | | at Mount St. Mary's | L 64–72 | 1–16 | Knott Arena; Emmitsburg, MD |
| January 20, 2020; 1:00 p.m. | | at Fairleigh Dickinson | L 47–66 | 1–17 | Rothman Center; Hackensack, NJ |
| January 25, 2020; 1:00 p.m. | | Wagner | W 66–63 | 2–17 | William H. Detrick Gymnasium; New Britain, CT |
| January 27, 2020; 7:00 p.m. | | Sacred Heart | L 52–54 | 2–18 | William H. Detrick Gymnasium; New Britain, CT |
| February 1, 2020; 4:00 p.m. | | at Robert Morris | L 42–80 | 2–19 | U p.m.C Events Center; Moon Township, PA |
| February 3, 2020; 7:00 p.m. | | at Saint Francis | L 68–72 | 2–20 | DeGol Arena; Loretto, PA |
| February 8, 2020; 1:00 p.m., ESPN+ | | at Bryant | W 59–47 | 2–21 | Chace Athletic Center; Smithfield, RI |
| February 15, 2020; 1:00 p.m. | | Bryant | L 51–62 | 2–22 | William H. Detrick Gymnasium; New Britain, CT |
| February 17, 2020; 7:00 p.m. | | Fairleigh Dickinson | L 55–63 | 2–23 | William H. Detrick Gymnasium; New Britain, CT |
| February 21, 2020; 7:00 p.m. | | at Wagner | L 56–63 | 2–24 | Spiro Sports Center; Staten Island, NY |
| February 29, 2020; 1:00 p.m. | | at Merrimack | L 46–56 | 2–25 | Merrimack Athletics Complex; North Andover, MA |
| March 2, 2020; 7:00 p.m. | | LIU | W 71–57 | 3–25 | William H. Detrick Gymnasium; New Britain, CT |
| March 5, 2020; 7:00 p.m. | | St. Francis Brooklyn | W 75–54 | 4–25 | William H. Detrick Gymnasium; New Britain, CT |
*Non-conference game. ^{#}Rankings from AP poll. (#) Tournament seedings in parentheses. All times are in Eastern.
