= 2018–19 Sacred Heart Pioneers women's basketball team =

American college basketball season

2018–19 Sacred Heart Pioneers women's basketball

WNIT, First Round
- Conference: Northeast Conference
- Record: 19–13 (14–4 NEC)
- Head coach: Jessica Mannetti (6th season)
- Home arena: William H. Pitt Center

2018–19 Northeast Conference women's basketball standings
	Conf.				Overall
Team	W		L	PCT	W		L	PCT
Robert Morris †	16	–	2	.889	22	–	11	.667
Sacred Heart	14	–	4	.778	19	–	13	.594
St. Francis Brooklyn	12	–	6	.667	18	–	13	.581
Saint Francis (PA)	11	–	7	.611	16	–	17	.485
Bryant	9	–	9	.500	11	–	19	.367
Mount St. Mary's	8	–	10	.444	15	–	16	.484
Wagner	8	–	10	.444	10	–	20	.333
Fairleigh Dickinson	5	–	13	.278	8	–	22	.267
Central Connecticut	4	–	14	.222	7	–	21	.250
LIU Brooklyn	3	–	15	.167	4	–	25	.138
† 2019 NEC tournament winner As of March 16, 2019; Rankings from AP poll

The 2018–19 Sacred Heart Pioneers women's basketball team represented the Sacred Heart University during the 2018–19 NCAA Division I women's basketball season.

== Roster ==
2018–19 Sacred Heart Pioneers women's basketball team
Players
Coaches

Pos.	#	Name	Height	Year	Hometown
F	7	Cleo Polyzou	5 ft 11 in (1.8 m)	Sr	Athens, Greece
G	3	Nikki Johnson	5 ft 9 in (1.75 m)	GS	Parsippany, N.J.
G	4	Jayla Davis	5 ft 7 in (1.7 m)	So	Hurt, VA
G	5	Erin Storck	5 ft 7 in (1.7 m)	So	Commack, NY
G	10	Olivia Dabney	5 ft 10 in (1.78 m)	So	East Windsor, NJ
G	12	Allyson Murphy	5 ft 5 in (1.65 m)	Jr	North Bellmore, NY
F	13	Katherine Haines	6 ft 2 in (1.88 m)	So	Ridgefield Park, NJ
G	15	Asia McCray	5 ft 9 in (1.75 m)	So	Washington DC
	21	Candice Leatherwood	5 ft 7 in (1.7 m)		Detroit, MI
G	22	Adrianne Hagood	5 ft 8 in (1.73 m)	So	Washington DC
C	23	Madison Cheatham	6 ft 4 in (1.93 m)	Jr	Upper Marlboro, MD
G	24	Kiana Ye	5 ft 8 in (1.73 m)		Williamstown, NJ
F	32	Abigail Kangudie	—	So	Whitby, Ontario

Head coach

- Jessica Mannetti (Concordia College)

Assistant coach(es)

Legend

- (C) Team captain
- (S) Suspended
- (I) Ineligible
- (W) Walk-on
- Injured
- Current redshirt

Roster
Last update: September 9, 2023

== Schedule ==
Date time, TV	Rank^{#}	Opponent^{#}	Result	Record	Site (attendance) city, state
Non-conference regular season
November 6, 2018*; 4:00 pm		at UMass	L 61–78	0–1	Mullins Center (547); Amherst, MA
November 13, 2018*; 6:00 pm		Siena	W 72–50	1–1	William H. Pitt Center; Fairfield, CT
November 18, 2018*; 1:00 pm		at New Hampshire	W 71–60	2–1	Lundholm Gym (207); Durham, NH
November 21, 2018*; 12:00 pm		at Providence	L 52–62	2–2	Alumni Hall (130); Providence, RI
November 25, 2018*; 1:00 pm		Monmouth	L 50–55	2–3	William H Pitt Center; Fairfield, CT
November 29, 2018*; 7:00 pm		at Hofstra	W 70–64	3–3	Mack Sports Complex; Hempstead, NY
December 4, 2018*; 6:00 pm		Stony Brook	L 58–73	3–4	William H Pitt Center (224); Fairfield, CT
December 8, 2018*; 2:00 pm		at Lehigh	L 66–70	3–5	Stabler Arena (451); Bethlehem, PA
December 16, 2018*; 2:00 pm		at Manhattan	W 74–46	4–5	Draddy Gymnasium (125); Riverdale, NY
December 20, 2018*; 11:00 am		Saint Joseph's	L 44–61	4–6	William H Pitt Center (909); Fairfield, CT
December 28, 2018*; 11:30 am		at Kentucky	L 43–71	4–7	Memorial Coliseum (4,079); Lexington, KY
Northeast Conference regular season
January 5, 2019; 1:00 pm		Central Connecticut	W 66–61	5–7 (1–0)	William H Pitt Center (303); Fairfield, CT
January 7, 2019; 6:00 pm		LIU Brooklyn	W 75–53	6–7 (2–0)	William H Pitt Center (201); Fairfield, CT
January 12, 2019; 1:00 pm		at Wagner	W 80–68	7–7 (3–0)	Spiro Sports Center (438); Staten Island, NY
January 14, 2019; 6:00 pm		Bryant	W 49–48	8–7 (4–0)	William H Pitt Center (257); Fairfield, CT
January 19, 2019; 1:00 pm		at St. Francis Brooklyn	W 68–66	9–7 (5–0)	Generoso Pope Athletic Complex (278); Brooklyn, NY
January 21, 2019; 1:00 pm		Wagner	W 80–68	10–7 (6–0)	William H Pitt Center (323); Fairfield, CT
January 26, 2019; 4:00 pm		at Saint Francis	L 68–85	10–8 (6–1)	DeGol Arena (217); Loretto, PA
January 28, 2019; 7:00 pm		at Robert Morris	L 46–64	10–9 (6–2)	North Athletic Complex (271); Moon Township, PA
February 2, 2019; 1:00 pm		St. Francis Brooklyn	L 53–56	10–10 (6–3)	William H Pitt Center (353); Fairfield, CT
February 9, 2019; 12:00 pm		Mount St. Mary's	W 76–41	11–10 (7–3)	William H Pitt Center (326); Fairfield, CT
February 11, 2019; 6:00 pm		Fairleigh Dickinson	W 68–62	12–10 (8–3)	William H Pitt Center (179); Fairfield, CT
February 16, 2019; 3:00 pm		at Bryant	W 67–57	13–10 (9–3)	Chace Athletic Center (247); Smithfield, RI
February 18, 2019; 1:00 pm		at LIU Brooklyn	L 64–69	13–11 (9–4)	Steinberg Wellness Center (487); Brooklyn, NY
February 23, 2019; 1:00 pm		at Central Connecticut	W 73–46	14–11 (10–4)	William H. Detrick Gymnasium (412); New Britain, CT
February 25, 2019; 7:00 pm		at Fairleigh Dickinson	W 82–63	15–11 (11–4)	Rothman Center (313); Teaneck, NJ
March 2, 2019; 1:00 pm		Saint Francis	W 77–51	16–11 (12–4)	William H Pitt Center (307); Fairfield, CT
March 4, 2019; 6:00 pm		Robert Morris	W 54–45	17–11 (17–4)	William H Pitt Center (207); Fairfield, CT
March 7, 2019; 7:00 pm		at Mount St. Mary's	W 53–46	18–11 (14–4)	Knott Arena (221); Emmitsburg, MD
Northeast Conference Women's Tournament
March 11, 2019; 7:00 pm	(2)	(7) Wagner; Quarterfinals	W 68–51	19–11	William H. Pitt Center (470); Fairfield, CT
March 14, 2019; 6:00 pm	(2)	(4) Saint Francis; Semifinals	L 60–68	19–12	William H. Pitt Center (552); Fairfield, CT
WNIT
March 22, 2019; 7:00 pm		Georgetown; First Round	L 59–90	19–13	McDonough Gymnasium (345); Washington, D.C.
*Non-conference game. ^{#}Rankings from AP Poll. (#) Tournament seedings in parentheses. All times are in Eastern.
