= 2018–19 Central Connecticut Blue Devils women's basketball team =

Intercollegiate basketball season

2018–19 Central Connecticut Blue Devils women's basketball
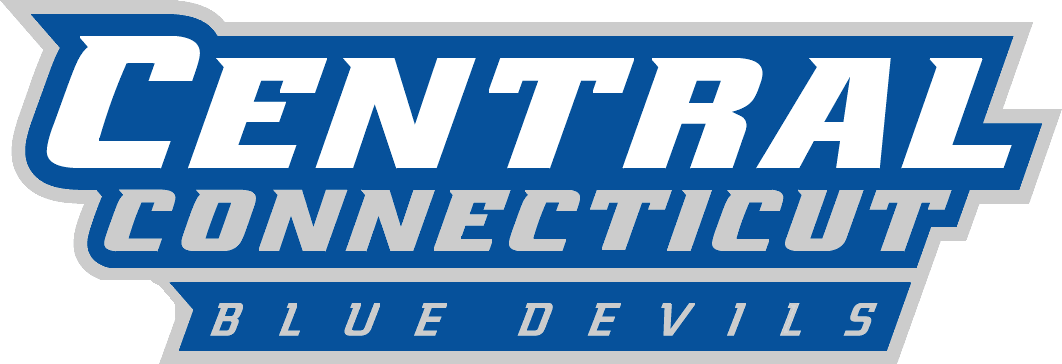
- Conference: Northeast Conference
- Record: 7–21 (4–14 NEC)
- Head coach: Beryl Piper (12th season)
- Assistant coaches: Kerri Reaves; Jason Marshall
- Home arena: William H. Detrick Gymnasium

2018–19 Northeast Conference women's basketball standings
	Conf.				Overall
Team	W		L	PCT	W		L	PCT
Robert Morris †	16	–	2	.889	22	–	11	.667
Sacred Heart	14	–	4	.778	19	–	13	.594
St. Francis Brooklyn	12	–	6	.667	18	–	13	.581
Saint Francis (PA)	11	–	7	.611	16	–	17	.485
Bryant	9	–	9	.500	11	–	19	.367
Mount St. Mary's	8	–	10	.444	15	–	16	.484
Wagner	8	–	10	.444	10	–	20	.333
Fairleigh Dickinson	5	–	13	.278	8	–	22	.267
Central Connecticut	4	–	14	.222	7	–	21	.250
LIU Brooklyn	3	–	15	.167	4	–	25	.138
† 2019 NEC tournament winner As of March 16, 2019; Rankings from AP poll

The 2018–19 Central Connecticut Blue Devils women's basketball team represented Central Connecticut State University during the 2018–19 NCAA Division I women's basketball season. The Blue Devils were led by twelfth-year head coach Beryl Piper, and played their home games at the William H. Detrick Gymnasium in New Britain, Connecticut as members of the Northeast Conference (NEC). They finished the season 7–21 overall, 4–14 in NEC play, to finish in ninth place. They failed to qualify for the NEC women's tournament.

== Roster ==
2018–19 Central Connecticut Blue Devils women's basketball team
Players
Coaches

Pos.	#	Name	Height	Year	Previous school	Hometown
G	2	Taylor Goode	5 ft 7 in (1.7 m)	RS So	St. Anthony's	Holbrook, NY
G	4	Kiana Patterson	5 ft 6 in (1.68 m)	Sr	Troy	Troy, NY
F	10	Andi Lydon	6 ft 0 in (1.83 m)	Sr	Shaler	Allison Park, PA
G	11	Bruna Vila Artigues	5 ft 6 in (1.68 m)	Jr	INS Tres Turons	Arenys de Munt, Spain
G	12	Sydney Hines	5 ft 7 in (1.7 m)	Sr	New Town	Owings Mills, MD
G/F	14	Ashley Forker	5 ft 10 in (1.78 m)	So	Faith Christian Academy	Telford, PA
G	15	Emma McCamus	5 ft 7 in (1.7 m)	So	Bill Crothers Secondary	Cavan Monaghan, ON
F	22	Ashley Chin	5 ft 8 in (1.73 m)	Jr	Dunarton	Pickering, ON
G/F	23	Danielle Delano	5 ft 9 in (1.75 m)	Fr	Enfield	Enfield, CT
G	24	Forever Toppin	5 ft 8 in (1.73 m)	Fr	Sinai Christian Academy	Paterson, NJ
F	25	Denisha Gardener	6 ft 1 in (1.85 m)	Sr	Kolbe Cathedral	Norwalk, CT
F	32	Tiffany Slicklein	5 ft 11 in (1.8 m)	So	Kings Park	Kings Park, NY
C	33	Ashley Berube	6 ft 2 in (1.88 m)	So	Tilton	Londonderry, NH
C	40	Carly Reynolds	6 ft 2 in (1.88 m)	Fr	Clarence	Williamsville, NY

Head coach

- Beryl Piper (Central Connecticut State)

Assistant coach(es)

- Kerri Reaves (Marquette)
- Jason Marshall (Ramapo)

Legend

- (C) Team captain
- (S) Suspended
- (I) Ineligible
- (W) Walk-on
- Injured
- Current redshirt

Roster
Last update: August 13, 2024

== Schedule ==
Date time, TV	Rank^{#}	Opponent^{#}	Result	Record	Site (attendance) city, state
Non-conference regular season
November 6, 2018*; 7:00 p.m., ESPN+		at Brown	L 63–68	0–1	Pizzitola Sports Center (305); Providence, RI
November 10, 2018*; 11:00 a.m.		Lehigh	L 62–88	0–2	William H. Detrick Gymnasium (687); New Britain, CT
November 13, 2018*; 7:00 p.m., BTN		at Rutgers	L 44–73	0–3	Louis Brown Athletic Center (4,583); Piscataway, NJ
November 17, 2018*; 2:00 p.m., ESPN+		at Massachusetts	L 59–74	0–4	Mullins Center (676); Amherst, MA
November 26, 2018*; 5:30 p.m.		at Morgan State	W 60–36	1–4	Talmadge L. Hill Field House (489); Baltimore, MD
December 1, 2018*; 1:00 p.m.		Buffalo	L 69–82	1–5	William H. Detrick Gymnasium; New Britain, CT
December 5, 2018*; 7:00 p.m.		at Albany	W 60–53	2–5	SEFCU Arena (901); Albany, NY
December 16, 2018*; 1:00 p.m.		New Hampshire	W 56–47	3–5	William H. Detrick Gymnasium (703); New Britain, CT
December 20, 2018*; 12:00 p.m., ESPN+		at Yale	L 46–58	3–6	John J. Lee Amphitheater (1,890); New Haven, CT
December 28, 2018*; 7:00 p.m.		Hartford; Rivalry	L 52–54	3–7	William H. Detrick Gymnasium (417); New Britain, CT
NEC regular season
January 5, 2019; 1:00 p.m.		at Sacred Heart	L 61–66	3–8 (0–1)	William H. Pitt Center (303); Fairfield, CT
January 7, 2019; 7:00 p.m.		Wagner	L 63–75	3–9 (0–2)	William H. Detrick Gymnasium (687); New Britain, CT
January 12, 2019; 2:00 p.m.		at Fairleigh Dickinson	L 67–74	3–10 (0–3)	Rothman Center (147); Teaneck, NJ
January 14, 2019; 7:00 p.m.		at Mount St. Mary's	L 53–84	3–11 (0–4)	Knott Arena (340); Emmitsburg, MD
January 19, 2019; 1:00 p.m.		Saint Francis (PA)	W 73–62	4–11 (1–4)	William H. Detrick Gymnasium; New Britain, CT
January 21, 2019; 1:00 p.m.		Robert Morris	L 57–64	4–12 (1–5)	William H. Detrick Gymnasium (985); New Britain, CT
January 26, 2019; 1:00 p.m.		at Bryant	L 60–72	4–13 (1–6)	Chace Athletic Center (269); Smithfield, RI
January 28, 2019; 7:00 p.m.		LIU Brooklyn	W 63–57	5–13 (2–6)	William H. Detrick Gymnasium (512); New Britain, CT
February 2, 2019; 1:00 p.m.		Bryant	W 66–65	6–13 (3–6)	William H. Detrick Gymnasium (698); New Britain, CT
February 9, 2019; 4:00 p.m.		at Saint Francis (PA)	L 68–83	6–14 (3–7)	DeGol Arena (825); Loretto, PA
February 11, 2019; 7:00 p.m.		at Robert Morris	L 40–60	6–15 (3–8)	North Athletic Complex (467); Moon Township, PA
February 16, 2019; 1:00 p.m., ESPN+		at Wagner	L 62–70	6–16 (3–9)	Spiro Sports Center (489); Staten Island, NY
February 18, 2019; 1:00 p.m.		at St. Francis Brooklyn	L 58–70	6–17 (3–10)	Generoso Pope Athletic Complex (247); Brooklyn, NY
February 23, 2019; 1:00 p.m.		Sacred Heart	L 46–73	6–18 (3–11)	William H. Detrick Gymnasium (412); New Britain, CT
February 25, 2019; 7:00 p.m.		Mount St. Mary's	L 44–61	6–19 (3–12)	William H. Detrick Gymnasium (453); New Britain, CT
March 2, 2019; 2:00 p.m.		at LIU Brooklyn	W 72–59	7–19 (4–12)	Steinberg Wellness Center (439); Brooklyn, NY
March 4, 2019; 7:00 p.m.		Fairleigh Dickinson	L 63–66	7–20 (4–13)	William H. Detrick Gymnasium (527); New Britain, CT
March 7, 2019; 7:00 p.m.		St. Francis Brooklyn	L 69–83	7–21 (4–14)	William H. Detrick Gymnasium (521); New Britain, CT
*Non-conference game. ^{#}Rankings from AP poll. (#) Tournament seedings in parentheses. All times are in Eastern.

== See also ==
- 2018–19 Central Connecticut Blue Devils men's basketball team
