= 2018–19 St. Francis Brooklyn Terriers women's basketball team =

Intercollegiate basketball season

2018–19 St. Francis Brooklyn Terriers women's basketball
- Conference: Northeast Conference
- Record: 18–13 (12–6 NEC)
- Head coach: Linda Cimino (1st season)
- Associate head coach: Chenel Harris-Smith (1st season)
- Assistant coaches: Sean Smith (1st season); Jessica Coscia (1st season)
- Home arena: Generoso Pope Athletic Complex

2018–19 Northeast Conference women's basketball standings
	Conf.				Overall
Team	W		L	PCT	W		L	PCT
Robert Morris †	16	–	2	.889	22	–	11	.667
Sacred Heart	14	–	4	.778	19	–	13	.594
St. Francis Brooklyn	12	–	6	.667	18	–	13	.581
Saint Francis (PA)	11	–	7	.611	16	–	17	.485
Bryant	9	–	9	.500	11	–	19	.367
Mount St. Mary's	8	–	10	.444	15	–	16	.484
Wagner	8	–	10	.444	10	–	20	.333
Fairleigh Dickinson	5	–	13	.278	8	–	22	.267
Central Connecticut	4	–	14	.222	7	–	21	.250
LIU Brooklyn	3	–	15	.167	4	–	25	.138
† 2019 NEC tournament winner As of March 16, 2019; Rankings from AP poll

The 2018–19 St. Francis Brooklyn Terriers women's basketball team represented St. Francis College during the 2018–19 NCAA Division I women's basketball season. The Terrier's home games were played at the Generoso Pope Athletic Complex. The team has been a member of the Northeast Conference since 1988. St. Francis Brooklyn is coached by Linda Cimino, who was in her first year at the helm of the Terriers.

The Terriers finished the season 18–13 overall and 12–6 in conference play. The 12 conference victories are the most in program history, the previous best was 10 set by the 2013–14 squad. The Terriers were the 3 seed in the NEC tournament and hosted 6 seed Mount St. Mary's. The Terriers lost 74–80 in the opening round of the NEC Tournament.

Of note, Amy O'Neill became the first Terrier to record a triple-double. She did so twice during the season, first at Sacred Heart (2/2/19) and again at home against LIU Brooklyn (2/16/19).

== Roster ==
2018–19 St. Francis Brooklyn Terriers women's basketball team
Players
Coaches

Pos.	#	Name	Height	Year	Hometown
G	20	Dominique Ward	5 ft 11 in (1.8 m)		Trenton, New Jersey
F	40	Tori Wagner	6 ft 2 in (1.88 m)	Sr	Freehold, New Jersey
F	34	Lorraine Hickman	6 ft 0 in (1.83 m)	Sr	Floral Park, New York
G	32	Dana DiRenzo	5 ft 10 in (1.78 m)	Sr	Hammonton, New Jersey
F	12	Maria Palarino	5 ft 10 in (1.78 m)	Sr	Irwin, Pennsylvania
G	1	Amy O'Neill (C)	5 ft 6 in (1.68 m)	Sr	Melbourne, Australia
G	3	Mia Ehling	5 ft 8 in (1.73 m)	RS Jr	Holmdel, New Jersey
G	23	Jade Johnson	5 ft 9 in (1.75 m)	Jr	Adelaide, Australia
F	13	Samantha Keltos	6 ft 2 in (1.88 m)	Jr	Ontario, Canada
F	35	Casey Carangelo	6 ft 1 in (1.85 m)	So	Thomaston, Connecticut
F	31	Ally Lassen	6 ft 1 in (1.85 m)	So	Point Pleasant, New Jersey
F	22	Abby Anderson	5 ft 11 in (1.8 m)	So	Scranton, Pennsylvania
G	50	Jaylene Brown	5 ft 6 in (1.68 m)	Fr	Bronx, New York
G	33	Alex Tudor	5 ft 11 in (1.8 m)	Fr	Clifton Park, New York
G	14	Kate Bauhof	5 ft 7 in (1.7 m)	Fr	York, Pennsylvania
G	10	Ebony Horton	5 ft 10 in (1.78 m)	Fr	Loughborough, England

Head coach

- Linda Cimino (Adelphi '01)

Assistant coach(es)

- Chenel Harris-Smith (Kent State '10)
- Sean Smith (Rutgers '05)
- Jessica Coscia (Caldwell '15)

Legend

- (C) Team captain
- (S) Suspended
- (I) Ineligible
- (W) Walk-on
- Injured
- Current redshirt

Roster
Last update: January 8, 2019

== Schedule ==
Date time, TV	Opponent	Result	Record	High points	High rebounds	High assists	Site (attendance) city, state
Non-conference regular season
November 6, 2018*; 7:00 pm	Mercy	W 102–51	1–0	19 – Johnson	10 – Direnzo	10 – Bauhof	Generoso Pope Athletic Complex (206); Brooklyn, NY
November 10, 2018*; 2:00 pm	Manhattan	W 73–65	2–0	20 – Johnson	8 – Palarino	7 – O'Neill	Generoso Pope Athletic Complex (303); Brooklyn, NY
November 16, 2018*; 4:00 pm	vs. Chicago State; Vinewood Farm Classic	W 110–73	3–0	18 – Bauhof	8 – Anderson	11 – O'Neill	Ellis Johnson Arena (265); Morehead, KY
November 17, 2018*; 7:30 pm	vs. Valparaiso; Vinewood Farm Classic	L 76–78	3–1	24 – Johnson	9 – Palarino	8 – O'Neill	Ellis Johnson Arena (100); Morehead, KY
November 18, 2018*; 4:05 pm	at Morehead State; Vinewood Farm Classic	W 101–94	4–1	27 – Johnson	7 – Ward	5 – Horton	Ellis Johnson Arena (665); Morehead, KY
November 25, 2018*; 1:00 pm	at Seton Hall	L 77–100	4–2	17 – Pallarino, Lassen	8 – O'Neill	7 – O'Neill	Walsh Gymnasium (658); South Orange, NJ
November 28, 2018*; 5:05 pm	at Army	L 57–69	4–3	25 – Johnson	9 – Palarino	5 – O'Neill	Christl Arena (650); West Point, NY
December 7, 2018*; 7:00 pm	at Loyola (MD)	W 75–70 ^{3OT}	5–3	16 – Johnson	11 – Palarino, O'Neill	9 – O'Neill	Reitz Arena (513); Baltimore, MD
December 10, 2018*; 7:00 pm	Saint Peter's	W 74–70	6–3	23 – Johnson	8 – Palarino	10 – O'Neill	Generoso Pope Athletic Complex (231); Brooklyn, NY
December 15, 2018*; 1:00 pm	Albany	L 60–67	6–4	15 – O'Neill	8 – O'Neill	8 – O'Neill	Generoso Pope Athletic Complex (448); Brooklyn, NY
December 19, 2018*; 2:00 pm	Princeton	L 64–83	6–5	31 – Johnson	8 – Lassen	9 – O'Neill	Generoso Pope Athletic Complex (244); Brooklyn, NY
December 30, 2018*; 2:00 pm, ESPN3	at Stony Brook	L 67–74	6–6	18 – Ward	8 – O'Neill, Ward	6 – O'Neill	Island Federal Credit Union Arena (623); Stony Brook, NY
Northeast Conference Regular Season
January 5, 2019; 1:00 pm	Wagner	W 76–61	7–6 (1–0)	20 – Johnson	6 – O'Neill, Lassen	8 – O'Neill	Generoso Pope Athletic Complex (300); Brooklyn, NY
January 7, 2019; 7:00 pm, ESPN3	at Bryant	W 60–55	8–6 (2–0)	16 – Ward	7 – Palarino	9 – O'Neill	Chace Athletic Center (315); Smithfield, RI
January 12, 2019; 1:00 pm	Robert Morris	L 56–75	8–7 (2–1)	14 – Johnson	8 – Palarino	6 – O'Neill	Generoso Pope Athletic Complex (271); Brooklyn, NY
January 14, 2019; 7:00 pm	Saint Francis (PA)	W 78–65	9–7 (3–1)	27 – Johnson	10 – Johnson, Palarino	6 – O'Neill, Horton	Generoso Pope Athletic Complex (227); Brooklyn, NY
January 19, 2019; 1:00 pm	Sacred Heart	L 66–68	9–8 (3–2)	20 – O'Neill	10 – Johnson	9 – O'Neill	Generoso Pope Athletic Complex (278); Brooklyn, NY
January 21, 2019; 12:00 pm, ESPN3	at LIU Brooklyn; Battle of Brooklyn	W 79–67	10–8 (4–2)	33 – Johnson	11 – O'Neill	8 – O'Neill	Steinberg Wellness Center (278); Brooklyn, NY
January 26, 2019; 2:00 pm	at Fairleigh Dickinson	W 64–53	11–8 (5–2)	14 – O'Neill	12 – O'Neill	6 – O'Neill	Rothman Center (177); Teaneck, NJ
January 28, 2019; 7:00 pm	at Mount St. Mary's	L 75–78	11–9 (5–3)	25 – Johnson	9 – Johnson	7 – O'Neill	Knott Arena (388); Emmitsburg, MD
February 2, 2019; 1:00 pm	at Sacred Heart	W 56–53 ^{OT}	12–9 (6–3)	20 – Johnson	13 – O'Neill	12 – O'Neill	William H. Pitt Center (269); Fairfield, CT
February 9, 2019; 1:00 pm	Fairleigh Dickinson	W 73–61	13–9 (7–3)	17 – Lassen	7 – 3 tied	11 – O'Neill	Generoso Pope Athletic Complex (308); Brooklyn, NY
February 11, 2019; 7:00 pm	at Wagner	L 85–87	13–10 (7–4)	30 – Johnson	7 – Lassen, Palarino	13 – O'Neill	Spiro Sports Center (374); Staten Island, NY
February 16, 2019; 1:00 pm	LIU Brooklyn	W 87–64	14–10 (8–4)	31 – Johnson	10 – O'Neill	11 – O'Neill	Generoso Pope Athletic Complex (253); Brooklyn, NY
February 18, 2019; 1:00 pm	Central Connecticut	W 70–58	15–10 (9–4)	21 – Johnson	9 – Palarino	8 – O'Neill	Generoso Pope Athletic Complex (247); Brooklyn, NY
February 23, 2019; 1:00 pm	at Robert Morris	L 57–74	15–11 (9–5)	22 – Johnson	12 – O'Neill	9 – O'Neill	North Athletic Complex (363); Moon Township, PA
February 25, 2019; 7:00 pm	at Saint Francis (PA)	L 84–86	15–12 (9–6)	31 – Johnson	11 – Lassen	13 – O'Neill	DeGol Arena (577); Loretto, PA
March 2, 2019; 1:00 pm	Bryant	W 101–77	16–12 (10–6)	28 – O'Neill	8 – Lassen	9 – O'Neill	Generoso Pope Athletic Complex (316); Brooklyn, NY
March 4, 2019; 7:00 pm	Mount St. Mary's	W 69–65	17–12 (11–6)	18 – Horton	9 – Lassen	9 – O'Neill	Generoso Pope Athletic Complex (223); Brooklyn, NY
March 7, 2019; 7:00 pm	at Central Connecticut	W 83–69	18–12 (12–6)	22 – Lassen	7 – Lassen	11 – O’Neill	William H. Detrick Gymnasium (521); New Britain, CT
Northeast Conference tournament
March 11, 2018; 7:00 pm	(6) Mount St. Mary’s; Quarterfinals	L 74–80	18–13	20 – Johnson, Palarino	10 – Horton	10 – O'Neill	Generoso Pope Athletic Complex (354); Brooklyn, NY
*Non-conference game. ^{#}Rankings from AP Poll,. (#) Tournament seedings in parentheses. All times are in Eastern Time..

== Accolades and records ==
Amy O'Neill, senior guard

- Set record for most Assists in a season for St. Francis Brooklyn Terriers and the Northeast Conference (268)
- Recorded the programs first triple-double at Sacred Heart on February 2, 2019 (13 pts, 13 rebs, 12 assists)
- Set Terrier record for most assists in a game, 13 (February 11, 2019 & February 25, 2019)
- Selected first team All-NEC
- Selected to All-ECAC Honorable Mention
- Selected to the 2019 Division I-AAA Athletics Directors Association Scholar-Athlete Team
- Led NCAA Division I in assists per game (8.6)
- Led the NEC in steals (69)

Jade Johnson, junior guard

- Selected second team All-NEC
- Set Terrier record for most points in a season (598)

Ebony Horton, freshman guard

- Selected to the NEC All-Rookie Team

== See also ==
- 2018–19 St. Francis Brooklyn Terriers men's basketball team
