= 2019 Northeast Conference women's basketball tournament =

- Classification: Division I
- Season: 2018–19
- Teams: 8
- Champions: Robert Morris (7th title)
- Winning coach: Charlie Buscaglia
- MVP: Nneka Ezeigbo (Robert Morris)

2018–19 Northeast Conference women's basketball standings
	Conf.				Overall
Team	W		L	PCT	W		L	PCT
Robert Morris †	16	–	2	.889	22	–	11	.667
Sacred Heart	14	–	4	.778	19	–	13	.594
St. Francis Brooklyn	12	–	6	.667	18	–	13	.581
Saint Francis (PA)	11	–	7	.611	16	–	17	.485
Bryant	9	–	9	.500	11	–	19	.367
Mount St. Mary's	8	–	10	.444	15	–	16	.484
Wagner	8	–	10	.444	10	–	20	.333
Fairleigh Dickinson	5	–	13	.278	8	–	22	.267
Central Connecticut	4	–	14	.222	7	–	21	.250
LIU Brooklyn	3	–	15	.167	4	–	25	.138
† 2019 NEC tournament winner As of March 16, 2019; Rankings from AP poll

The 2019 Northeast Conference women's basketball tournament is the concluding event of the 2018–19 season of the Northeast Conference (NEC), held from March 11–17, 2019. Unlike most NCAA Division I basketball conference tournaments, the NEC tournament does not include all of the league's teams. The tournament instead features only the top eight teams from regular-season NEC play. Robert Morris won the conference tournament championship game over the St. Francis (PA), 65–54. Nneka Ezeigbo was named the tournament's Most Valuable Player.

== Seeds ==
Seed	School	Conference	Overall
1	Robert Morris	16–2	19–10
2	Sacred Heart	14–4	18–11
3	St. Francis Brooklyn	12–6	18–12
4	Saint Francis (PA)	11–7	14–16
5	Bryant	9–9	11–18
6	Mount St. Mary's	8–10	14–15
7	Wagner	8–10	10–19
8	Fairleigh Dickinson	5–13	8–21

== Bracket ==
Quarterfinals; Monday, March 11; NEC Front Row
1	Robert Morris	64
8	Fairleigh Dickinson	38
4	Saint Francis (PA)	91
5	Bryant	78
2	Sacred Heart	68
7	Wagner	51
3	St. Francis Brooklyn	74
6	Mount St. Mary's	80

Semifinals; Thursday, March 14; ESPN3
1	Robert Morris	69
6	Mount Saint Mary's	65
2	Sacred Heart	60
4	St. Francis (PA)	68

Championship; Sunday, March 17; ESPNU
1	Robert Morris	65
4	St. Francis (PA)	54

All games will be played at the venue of the higher seed

== All-tournament team ==
Tournament MVP in bold.

Name	School
**Nneka Ezeigbo**	Robert Morris
Nina Augustin	Robert Morris
Jess Kovatch	Saint Francis (PA)
Michaela Harrison	Mount St. Mary's
Michaela Harrison	Sacred Heart

== See also ==
- 2019 Northeast Conference men's basketball tournament
