= Sharon Beverly =

American basketball player

Coaching career (HC unless noted)
- 1982–1988: Queens (NY)
- 1988–1999: Fairleigh Dickinson
- 2000–2002: NJIT Highlanders

Administrative career (AD unless noted)
- 2021–present: Hartford

Sharon Beverly is an American former women's college basketball coach and athletics administrator. She served as the athletic director at the University of Hartford from 2021 to 2023. Beverly was also a former professional basketball player in France and the United States.

== Education ==
In 2010, Beverly earned her doctorate degree in Leadership for Higher Education. Her dissertation was about why few female athletes ended up becoming coaches. Some of the reasons women gave for not pursuing a career in coaching were perceived poor pay and a lack of visible women in those positions.

== Career ==
Beverly played basketball while an undergraduate at Queens College, playing with the team in the first women’s basketball game to be held at Madison Square Garden before graduating in 1979. After college, Beverly played professionally in France and for the New Jersey Gems, a team in the Women’s Professional Basketball League (WBL).

Beverly went on to become an assistant coach at Queens College before becoming head coach of the Fairleigh Dickinson women’s basketball team. She later coached for the New Jersey Institute of Technology, before becoming Associate Athletics Director and later director of athletics and physical education at Vassar College. In 2010, she was named Eastern Collegiate Athletic Conference Woman Administrator of the Year.

== Personal life ==
Beverly is married to the former American football player Randy Beverly.

== Head coaching record ==
Record table
Season	Team	Overall	Conference	Standing	Postseason
Fairleigh Dickinson Knights (Northeast Conference) (1989–1999)
1988–89	Fairleigh Dickinson	13–14	10–6	5th	
1989–90	Fairleigh Dickinson	17–13	9–7	3rd	
1990–91	Fairleigh Dickinson	11–16	8–8	7th	
1991–92	Fairleigh Dickinson	23–6	13–3	2nd	
1992–93	Fairleigh Dickinson	15–12	14–4	T–1st	
1993–94	Fairleigh Dickinson	3–24	2–16	10th	
1994–95	Fairleigh Dickinson	6–21	4–14	9th	
1995–96	Fairleigh Dickinson	12–15	8–10	T–6th	
1996–97	Fairleigh Dickinson	13–14	9–9	4th	
1997–98	Fairleigh Dickinson	6–21	6–10	7th	
1998–99	Fairleigh Dickinson	7–19	6–14	10th	
Fairleigh Dickinson:		126–175 (.419)	89–101 (.468)		
Total:					
National champion Postseason invitational champion Conference regular season champion Conference regular season and conference tournament champion Division regular season champion Division regular season and conference tournament champion Conference tournament champion
