= Michael Campbell (basketball) =

American basketball player

Personal information
- Born: May 21, 1975 (age 51) Brooklyn, New York, U.S.
- Listed height: 6 ft 6 in (1.98 m)
- Listed weight: 190 lb (86 kg)

Career information
- High school: Manhattan Park West HS (New York City, New York)
- College: Westchester CC (1993–1995); LIU Brooklyn (1995–1998)
- NBA draft: 1998: undrafted
- Playing career: 1998–2010
- Position: Shooting guard / small forward
- Number: 6, 8, 17

Career history
- 1998: Long Island Surf
- 1998–1999: Fort Wayne Fury
- 1999: Brooklyn Kings
- 2000–2001: ENAD
- 2001: Panteras de Miranda
- 2001–2002: Rida Scafati
- 2002: Panteras de Miranda
- 2002: Adirondack Wildcats
- 2002–2003: Hemofarm
- 2003: Crvena zvezda
- 2004: U.D. Oliveirense
- 2004: Brooklyn Kings
- 2004–2005: Andrea Costa Imola
- 2005: Aurora Jesi
- 2005: Gaiteros del Zulia
- 2006: Brooklyn Kings
- 2006: Atléticos de San Germán
- 2006: Maratonistas de Coamo
- 2006–2007: Atomia Brussels
- 2007–2008: Hapoel Galil Elyon
- 2008–2009: Albany Patroons
- 2009: Bucaneros de La Guaira
- 2009: Unión de Sunchales
- 2010: Optima Gent

Michael "Mike" Campbell (born May 21, 1975) is a retired American professional basketball player.

== High school and college career ==
Campbell was born in Brooklyn, New York and played at Manhattan Park West High School in New York City. He went on to play at the Westchester Community College. In 1995, he was transferred to LIU Brooklyn. He was named two-time Battle of Brooklyn MVP, 1997 and 1998. In December 2017, Campbell was honored as a member of the LIU Brooklyn Athletics Hall of Fame.

== Professional career ==
A swingman, Campbell played in Argentina, Belgium, Cyprus, France, Israel, Italy, Portugal, Venezuela, and Yugoslavia, beside domestic leagues such as CBA, USBL, and BSN (Puerto Rico).

Campbell played for YUBA League teams Hemofarm and Crvena zvezda between 2002 and 2003. In 2006, he played for two BSN teams, Atléticos de San Germán and Maratonistas de Coamo. In the 2007–08 season, he played for Israeli team Hapoel Galil Elyon. In 2009, he played for Argentinian team Unión de Sunchales. Campbell retired as a player with Belgian team Optima Gent in 2010.
