= Dartmouth Big Green women's basketball =

2025–26 Dartmouth Big Green women's basketball team
- University: Dartmouth College
- Head coach: Linda Cimino (2nd season)
- Location: Hanover, New Hampshire
- Arena: Leede Arena (capacity: 2,100)
- Conference: Ivy League
- Nickname: Big Green
- Colors: Dartmouth green and white

NCAA Division I tournament appearances
- 1983, 1995, 1999, 2000, 2005, 2006, 2009

Conference regular-season champions
- 1980, 1981, 1982, 1983, 1986, 1987, 1988, 1989, 1990, 1994, 1995, 1999, 2000, 2005, 2006, 2008, 2009

Uniforms
Home	Away	Alternate

The Dartmouth Big Green women's basketball team is the intercollegiate women's basketball program representing Dartmouth College. The school competes in the Ivy League in Division I of the National Collegiate Athletic Association (NCAA). The Big Green play home basketball games at the Leede Arena near the campus.

== History ==
As of the 2015–16 season, the Big Green have a 571–506 record, with a 326–189 record in the Ivy League. They have won the Ivy League 17 times (1980, 1981, 1982, 1983, 1986, 1987, 1988, 1989, 1990, 1994, 1995, 1999, 2000, 2005, 2006, 2008, and 2009). Dartmouth is 5–2 in playoffs to determine the automatic bid to the NCAA Tournament, winning 66–49 over Princeton in 1999, beating Harvard 75–61 in 2005, beating Brown 73–62 and Princeton 63–48 and winning over Harvard 68–62 in the first game of a three-way tie in 2008 while losing to Brown 72–62 in 1994 and losing to Cornell 64–47 in 2008 in the final game. The Big Green have reached the NCAA Tournament seven times (1983, 1995, 1999, 2000, 2005, 2006, and 2009), though they have lost each time.

Season	Record	Conference Record	Coach
1972–73	1–3	n/a	Douglas Bates
1973–74	6–1	n/a	Chris Clarke
1974–75	2–5	n/a	Chris Wielgus
1975–76	1–8	n/a	Chris Wielgus
1976–77	5–8	1–4 (7th)	Chris Wielgus
1977–78	9–8	0–5 (6th)	Chris Wielgus
1978–79	17–7	5–2 (5th)	Chris Wielgus
1979–80	16–9	9–1 (1st)	Chris Wielgus
1980–81	20–9	10–0 (1st)	Chris Wielgus
1981–82	14–9	8–1 (1st)	Chris Wielgus
1982–83	18–8	11–1 (1st)	Chris Wielgus
1983–84	8–15	6–6 (3rd)	Chris Wielgus
1984–85	11–15	8–4 (3rd)	Jacquelline Hullah
1985–86	15–11	9–3 (1st)	Jacquelline Hullah
1986–87	16–9	12–2 (1st)	Jacquelline Hullah
1987–88	19–7	12–2 (1st)	Jacquelline Hullah
1988–89	22–4	12–2 (1st)	Jacquelline Hullah
1989–90	23–3	13–1 (1st)	Jacquelline Hullah
1990–91	8–18	4–10 (6th)	Jacquelline Hullah
1991–92	16–10	9–5 (3rd)	Jacquelline Hullah
1992–93	8–18	6–8 (6th)	Jacquelline Hullah
1993–94	16–11	11–3 (1st)	Chris Wielgus
1994–95	16–11	12–2 (1st)	Chris Wielgus
1995–96	16–10	8–6 (3rd)	Chris Wielgus
1996–97	13–13	8–6 (3rd)	Chris Wielgus
1997–98	15–11	9–5 (3rd)	Chris Wielgus
1998–99	19–9	11–3 (1st)	Chris Wielgus
1999-00	20–8	12–2 (1st)	Chris Wielgus
2000–01	12–15	8–6 (3rd)	Chris Wielgus
2001–02	11–16	7–7 (4th)	Chris Wielgus
2002–03	15–12	9–5 (2nd)	Chris Wielgus
2003–04	15–12	8–6 (4th)	Chris Wielgus
2004–05	17–11	12–2 (1st)	Chris Wielgus
2005–06	23–7	12–2 (1st)	Chris Wielgus
2006–07	15–14	9–5 (2nd)	Chris Wielgus
2007–08	15–16	11–3 (1st)	Chris Wielgus
2008–09	18–11	13–1 (1st)	Chris Wielgus
2009–10	11–17	6–8 (5th)	Chris Wielgus
2010–11	7–21	3–11 (7th)	Chris Wielgus
2011–12	6–22	4–10 (7th)	Chris Wielgus
2012–13	6–22	4–10 (6th)	Chris Wielgus
2013–14	5–23	2–12 (8th)	Belle Koclanes
2014–15	14–14	5–9 (6th)	Belle Koclanes
2015–16	12–18	7–7 (4th)	Belle Koclanes
2016–17	8–19	3–11 (8th)	Belle Koclanes
2018–19	13–14	6–8 (5th)	Belle Koclanes
2019–20	10–17	4–10 (6th)	Belle Koclanes
2020–21	Season cancelled		

== Postseason appearances ==
In seven NCAA Tournament appearances, the Big Green are 0–7.

=== NCAA Division I Tournament appearances ===
Year	Seed	Round	Opponent	Result
1983	8	First round	Monmouth	L 58–77
1995	14	First round	(3) Virginia	L 68–71
1999	14	First round	(3) Rutgers	L 70–84
2000	13	First round	(4) Purdue	L 66–70
2005	14	First round	(3) Connecticut	L 47–95
2006	14	First round	(3) Rutgers	L 58–63
2009	16	First round	(1) Maryland	L 53–82

=== WNIT appearances ===
The Big Green are 0–2 in WNIT appearances.

Year	Round	Opponent	Result
2007	First round	Seton Hall	L 39–60
2008	First round	Vermont	L 50–69
