= Battle of Brooklyn (college rivalry) =

American college sports rivalry

Locations of LIU and St. Francis College

The Battle of Brooklyn was the college sports rivalry between Long Island University and St. Francis College. The LIU Sharks and SFBK Terriers were both in the Northeast Conference and competed against each other in various sports. The Battle of Brooklyn was a fierce rivalry, which originated in men's basketball; while the two schools are rivals in all sports that both schools sponsor, the "Battle of Brooklyn" name is currently applied only to matchups in men's and women's basketball and men's soccer. The intensity of the rivalry was augmented by the proximity of the two universities, located less than a half-mile (about 500 m) apart in Downtown Brooklyn. The name of the rivalry is in reference to the first major battle of the American Revolutionary War, the Battle of Brooklyn.

Prior to 2019–20, the rivalry involved LIU's Brooklyn campus, branded athletically as "LIU" or "Long Island" through 2012–13 and "LIU Brooklyn" from 2013 forward. With the 2019 merger of the athletic programs of LIU's two main campuses (Brooklyn and Post), creating the current LIU Sharks, the Battle of Brooklyn continues to be a pure geographic rivalry in basketball. The men's soccer rivalry is no longer a geographic "Battle of Brooklyn" because the merged LIU program chose to house that sport at the Post campus in Nassau County, New York. After the 2022-23 academic year, St. Francis Brooklyn ended intercollegiate sports, putting an end to the rivalry between the Sharks and Terriers.

== Men's basketball ==
Battle of Brooklyn
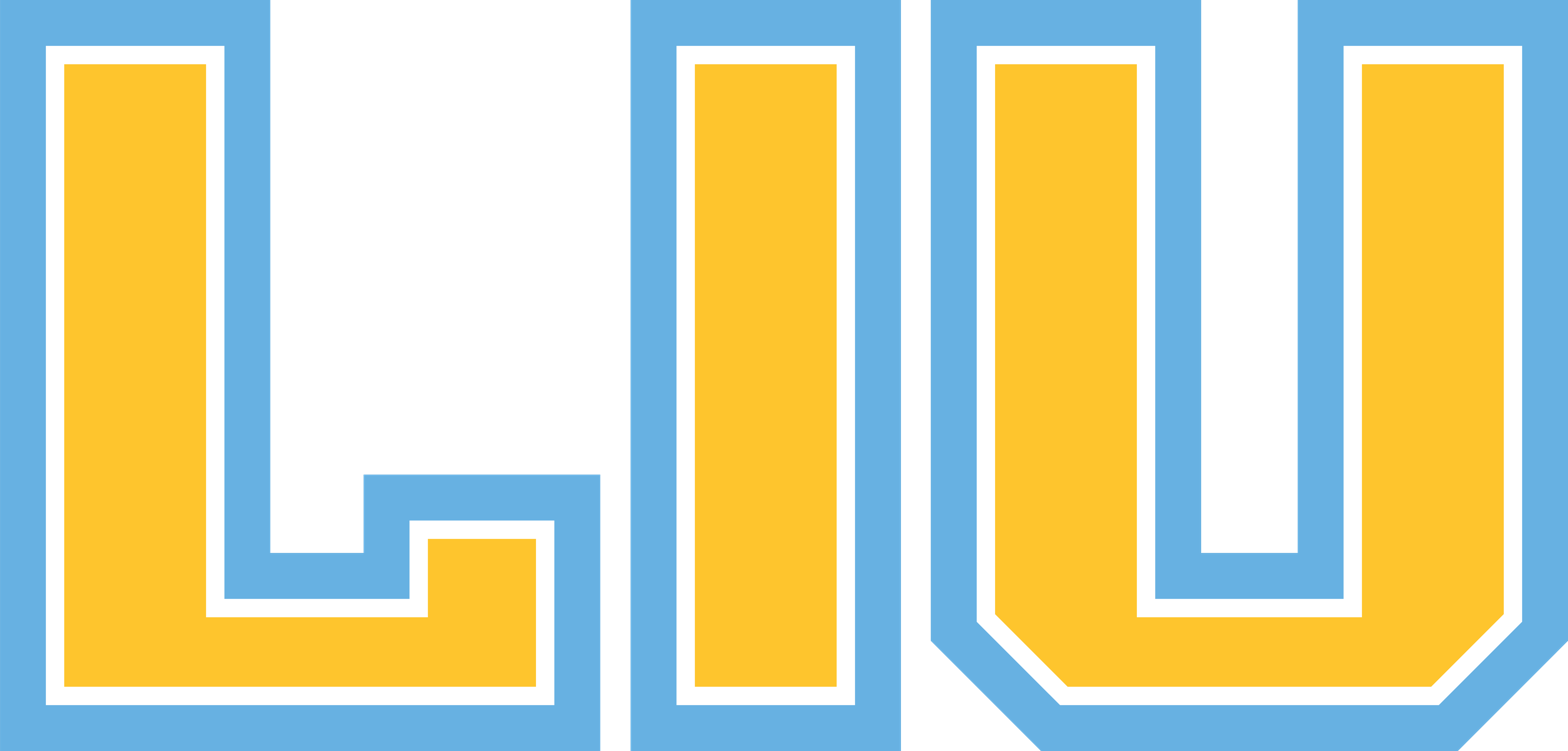
- St. Francis Brooklyn Terriers LIU Sharks
- Sport: Basketball
- First meeting: February 25, 1976; SFBK 83, LIU 79
- Latest meeting: January 28, 2023; SFBK 71, LIU 59
- Trophy: Lai-Lynch MVP Trophy

Statistics
- Total meetings: 49
- All-time series: LIU leads, 27–22
- Largest victory: LIU 82–45 (February 15, 2017)
- Longest win streak: SFBK, 5 (1999–2003)
- Current win streak: SFBK, 2 (2023)

The Battle of Brooklyn started as an annual basketball game played between the basketball programs of Long Island University (which then consisted only of today's LIU Brooklyn campus) and St. Francis College. The rivalry between the Terriers and the Sharks (previously known as the Blackbirds) dates back to the 1928 season, when they first played one another, but the tradition of an annual game between the two programs began in the 1975–76 season predating when both teams joined the Northeast Conference in the 1981. At the conclusion of each game an MVP is announced and the winning team receives the Lai-Lynch Trophy, which honors William Lai and Daniel Lynch, the former Athletic Directors of Long Island and St. Francis, respectively.

The Battle of Brooklyn plaque listing the past men's basketball winners since 1976

Both the St. Francis Brooklyn Terriers and the LIU Sharks compete in the Division I Northeast Conference. Although the two schools regularly play twice each regular season, only one of the games, usually the last, is officially designated as a Battle of Brooklyn game. The host of the designated Battle of Brooklyn alternates annually and is held at campus sites. The Blackbirds host their games at the Steinberg Wellness Center. Through the 2021–22 season, the Terriers played home games at the Generoso Pope Athletic Complex. In 2022, SFC moved its campus from Remsen Street in Brooklyn Heights to Livingston Street in Downtown Brooklyn; with the new campus lacking a basketball venue, the Terriers will at least temporarily play home games at the Activity Resource Center (ARC) of Pratt Institute, located about 2 miles away in the Clinton Hill neighborhood. The 39th installment of the Battle of Brooklyn was held at the Barclays Center, the largest venue so far for the annual contest, with LIU Brooklyn as the hosts. The Sharks led the overall series 69–45 and the Battle of Brooklyn series 25–20.

=== Notable games ===
- The first game of the Battle of Brooklyn rivalry was played on February 25, 1976 before 1,000 spectators at the "old Brooklyn Paramount theater." The game was decided in the final 40 seconds, when Tony Babin of St. Francis scored on a lay-up to give the Terriers a 3-point lead.
- In a testament to the rivalry's intensity, on January 4, 1994, the Terriers, suffering through the worst season in school history (eventually finishing at 1–26) stepped it up a notch and collected their only win of the season, beating LIU by 11 points, 78-67.
- On February 22, 2003, the Terriers hosted the Blackbirds at The Pope and both teams set a NEC record for points in a game. The match-up went into double overtime and featured 282 points, with St. Francis winning, 142–140.
- The Blackbirds' first game at the Steinberg Wellness Center was on January 26, 2006 against Sacred Heart. Yet the grand opening of the Steinberg Wellness Center was for the Long Island vs. St. Francis men's basketball game on February 27, 2006. The wait until the Battle of Brooklyn game for the grand opening of the Wellness Center is a testament to the rivalry's importance to both schools. The Blackbirds previously held their home games at the Schwartz Athletic Center.
- On February 6, 2010, the Blackbirds and Terriers went into triple overtime in the annual Battle of Brooklyn game. The Terriers were eventually able to beat the Blackbirds. After the game former LIU head coach Jim Ferry had this to say: "A 10-point lead in a Battle of Brooklyn game is never safe. I’ve been through this before, I think this is my third overtime game in this series..."

=== Men's game results ===
Long Island/LIU Brooklyn victories shaded black ██. Beginning with the 2019-20 season LIU victories are shaded gold ██.

St. Francis College victories are shaded blue ██.

#	Date	Site	Winner	Score	MVP	Series
1	February 25, 1976	Schwartz Athletic Center	St. Francis	83–79	Jerome Williams (SFBK)	SFBK 1–0
2	1976–77	Generoso Pope Athletic Complex	Long Island	114–92	Gerard Trapp (SFBK)	Tied 1–1
3	1977–78	Schwartz Athletic Center	Long Island	64–61	John N. Bailey (LIU)	LIU 2–1
4	1978–79	Neutral Location	St. Francis	82–72	Manny Figueroa (SFBK)	Tied 2–2
5	December 3, 1979	Generoso Pope Athletic Complex	Long Island	91–69	Robert Cole (LIU)	LIU 3–2
6	January 14, 1981	Schwartz Athletic Center	Long Island	85–67	Rudy Johnson (LIU)	LIU 4–2
7	January 18, 1982	Generoso Pope Athletic Complex	Long Island	98–82	Riley Clarida (LIU)	LIU 5–2
8	January 5, 1983	Schwartz Athletic Center	St. Francis	81–72	Kevin Henry (SFBK)	LIU 5–3
9	February 4, 1984	Generoso Pope Athletic Complex	Long Island	88–81	Carey Scurry (LIU)	LIU 6–3
10	December 7, 1984	Schwartz Athletic Center	Long Island	68–63	Walter Jordan (LIU)	LIU 7–3
11	January 4, 1986	Schwartz Athletic Center	Long Island	76–66	Andre Evan (LIU)	LIU 8–3
12	January 3, 1987	Generoso Pope Athletic Complex	St. Francis	94–91^{OT}	Darwin Purdie (SFBK)	LIU 8–4
13	December 12, 1987	Schwartz Athletic Center	Long Island	66–63	Glenn Daniels (LIU)	LIU 9–4
14	February 20, 1989	Generoso Pope Athletic Complex	Long Island	79–77^{OT}	Freddie Burton (LIU)	LIU 10–4
15	January 6, 1990	Schwartz Athletic Center	St. Francis	74–63	John Arnold (SFBK)	LIU 10–5
16	February 9, 1991	Generoso Pope Athletic Complex	Long Island	117-115^{2OT}	Brent McCollin (LIU)	LIU 11–5
17	February 8, 1992	Schwartz Athletic Center	St. Francis	97–94	Lynn Smith (SFBK)	LIU 11–6
18	January 28, 1993	Generoso Pope Athletic Complex	St. Francis	107–98	Lou Meyers (SFBK)	LIU 11–7
19	January 4, 1994	Schwartz Athletic Center	St. Francis	78–67	Bryan Willcox (SFBK)	LIU 11–8
20	January 5, 1995	Generoso Pope Athletic Complex	Long Island	74–61	Joe Griffin (LIU)	LIU 12–8
21	February 19, 1996	Schwartz Athletic Center	Long Island	105–77	Dave Masciate (LIU)	LIU 13–8
22	January 25, 1997	Generoso Pope Athletic Complex	Long Island	68–64	Mike Campbell (LIU)	LIU 14–8
23	February 18, 1998	Schwartz Athletic Center	Long Island	86–71	Mike Campbell (LIU)	LIU 15–8
24	January 11, 1999	Generoso Pope Athletic Complex	St. Francis	74–68	Ray Mineland (SFBK)	LIU 15–9
25	January 19, 2000	Schwartz Athletic Center	St. Francis	66–63	Herberth Reyes (SFBK)	LIU 15–10
26	January 13, 2001	Generoso Pope Athletic Complex	St. Francis	81–63	Steven Howard (SFBK)	LIU 15–11
27	February 25, 2002	Schwartz Athletic Center	St. Francis	108–94^{OT}	Jason Morgan (SFBK)	LIU 15–12
28	February 22, 2003	Generoso Pope Athletic Complex	St. Francis	142–140^{2OT}	Cliff Strong (SFBK)	LIU 15–13
29	February 21, 2004	Schwartz Athletic Center	Long Island	78–75	Brandon Thomas (LIU)	LIU 16–13
30	February 10, 2005	Generoso Pope Athletic Complex	St. Francis	77–68	Allan Sheppard (SFBK)	LIU 16–14
31	February 27, 2006	Steinberg Wellness Center	Long Island	67–64	James Williams (LIU)	LIU 17–14
32	February 11, 2007	Generoso Pope Athletic Complex	Long Island	82–79^{OT}	James Williams (LIU)	LIU 18–14
33	February 21, 2008	Steinberg Wellness Center	St. Francis	67–64	Kayode Ayeni (SFBK)	LIU 18–15
34	February 28, 2009	Generoso Pope Athletic Complex	Long Island	66–54	Ron Manigault (LIU)	LIU 19–15
35	February 6, 2010	Steinberg Wellness Center	St. Francis	88–84^{3OT}	Ricky Cadell (SFBK)	LIU 19–16
36	February 12, 2011; MSG	Generoso Pope Athletic Complex	Long Island	82–80	C. J. Garner (LIU)	LIU 20–16
37	February 12, 2012; MSG	Steinberg Wellness Center	Long Island	81–78	Jamal Olasewere (LIU)	LIU 21–16
38	January 24, 2013; FCS/MSG+	Generoso Pope Athletic Complex	Long Island	78–68	C. J. Garner (LIU)	LIU 22–16
39	February 16, 2014; FCS/MSG	Barclays Center	LIU Brooklyn	69–68	Jason Brickman (LIU)	LIU 23–16
40	January 31, 2015; FCS/MSG	Generoso Pope Athletic Complex	St. Francis	81–64	Brent Jones (SFBK)	LIU 23–17
41	January 23, 2016; ESPN3	Steinberg Wellness Center	St. Francis	64–49	Chris Hooper (SFBK)	LIU 23–18
42	February 15, 2017; CBSSN	Generoso Pope Athletic Complex	LIU Brooklyn	82–45	Jerome Frink (LIU)	LIU 24–18
43	February 22, 2018	Steinberg Wellness Center	LIU Brooklyn	81–76	Joel Hernandez (LIU)	LIU 25–18
44	February 14, 2019	Generoso Pope Athletic Complex	St. Francis	83–76	Glenn Sanabria (SFBK)	LIU 25–19
45	February 18, 2020; ESPNU	Steinberg Wellness Center	St. Francis	87–77	Milija Cosic (SFBK)	LIU 25–20
46	January 30, 2021; ESPN3 & SNY	Generoso Pope Athletic Complex	LIU Sharks	102–88	Ty Flowers & Eral Penn (LIU)	LIU 26–20
47	February 10, 2022; ESPN3	Steinberg Wellness Center	LIU Sharks	74–69	Ty Flowers & Eral Penn (LIU)	LIU 27–20
48	January 16, 2023; ESPN3	Steinberg Wellness Center	St. Francis	73-66		LIU 27-21
49	January 28, 2023; NEC Front Row	Pratt ARC	St. Francis	71-59		LIU 27-22

== Women's basketball ==
Battle of Brooklyn
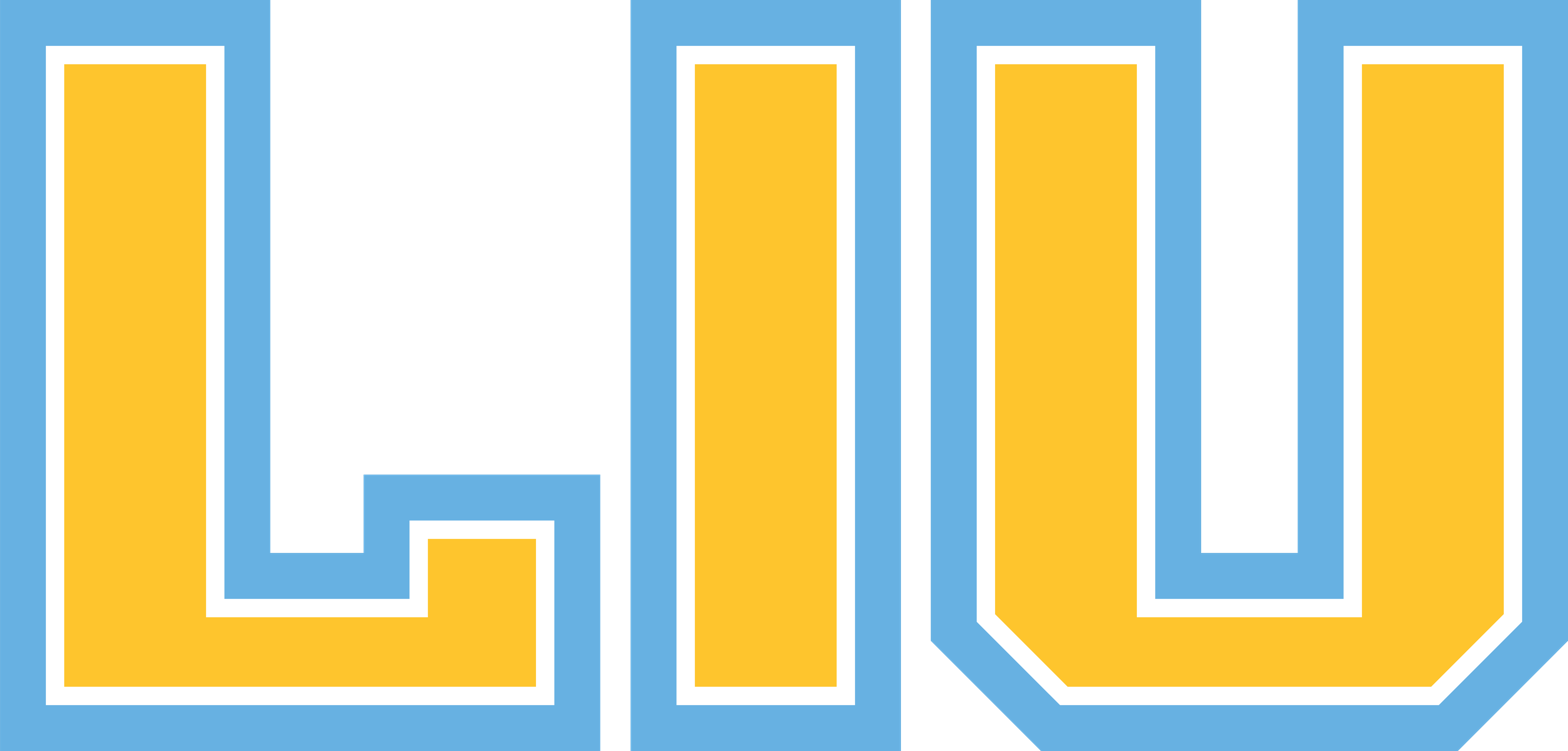
- St. Francis Brooklyn Terriers LIU Sharks
- Sport: Basketball
- First meeting: February 26, 1994; LIU 76, SFBK 63
- Latest meeting: February 11, 2022; SFBK 82, LIU 73
- Trophy: MVP Trophy

Statistics
- Total meetings: 29
- All-time series: SFBK, 16–13
- Largest victory: LIU 66–39 (February 4, 2010)
- Longest win streak: 6 SFBK, 2017-present
- Current win streak: SFBK, 6 (2017–present)

During the 1993–94 season the women's basketball programs of St. Francis College and Long Island University contested their first official Battle of Brooklyn. Since February 21, 1975 when the two teams first met, LIU leads the overall series 50–30. St. Francis leads the Battle of Brooklyn series 16–13.

=== Women's game results ===
Long Island/LIU Brooklyn victories shaded black ██. Beginning in the 2019-20 season LIU victories are shaded gold ██.

St. Francis victories are shaded blue ██.

#	Date	Site	Winner	Score	MVP	Series
1	February 26, 1994	Generoso Pope Athletic Complex	Long Island	76–63	Nicole Thomas (LIU)	LIU 1–0
2	February 25, 1995	Schwartz Athletic Center	St. Francis	90–76	Christine Cunningham (SFBK)	Tied 1–1
3	January 18, 1996	Generoso Pope Athletic Complex	St. Francis	75–53	Dot Guerriero (SFBK)	SFBK 2–1
4	February 22, 1997	Schwartz Athletic Center	Long Island	81–68	Danielle Fiorello (LIU)	Tied 2–2
5	January 17, 1998	Generoso Pope Athletic Complex	St. Francis	90–80	Christine Taps (SFBK)	SFBK 3–2
6	January 7, 1999	Schwartz Athletic Center	St. Francis	71–50	Carolyn Harvey (SFBK)	SFBK 4–2
7	February 9, 2000	Generoso Pope Athletic Complex	Long Island	68–46	Kim MacMillan (LIU)	SFBK 4–3
8	January 31, 2001	Schwartz Athletic Center	Long Island	80–72	Tamika Dudley (LIU)	Tied 4–4
9	January 7, 2002	Generoso Pope Athletic Complex	Long Island	70–57	Tamika Dudley (LIU)	LIU 5–4
10	February 27, 2003	Schwartz Athletic Center	Long Island	73–55	Tamika Dudley (LIU)	LIU 6–4
11	March 1, 2004	Generoso Pope Athletic Complex	St. Francis	58–57^{OT}	Brittany Porter (SFBK)	LIU 6–5
12	February 21, 2005	Schwartz Athletic Center	St. Francis	62–57	Kim Bennett (SFBK)	Tied 6–6
13	January 23, 2006	Generoso Pope Athletic Complex	Long Island	64–52	Amber Wirth (LIU)	LIU 7–6
14	December 7, 2006	Steinberg Wellness Center	Long Island	59–54	Valerie Nainima (LIU)	LIU 8–6
15	March 3, 2008	Generoso Pope Athletic Complex	Long Island	62–49	Valerie Nainima (LIU)	LIU 9–6
16	January 17, 2009	Steinberg Wellness Center	St. Francis	49–48	Kara Ayers (SFBK)	LIU 9–7
17	February 4, 2010	Generoso Pope Athletic Complex	Long Island	66–39	Chelsi Johnson (LIU)	LIU 10–7
18	February 14, 2011	Steinberg Wellness Center	Long Island	64–41	Ashley Palmer (LIU)	LIU 11–7
19	February 15, 2012	Generoso Pope Athletic Complex	Long Island	60–53	Ashley Palmer (LIU)	LIU 12–7
20	January 28, 2013	Steinberg Wellness Center	St. Francis	69–58	Leah Fechko (SFBK)	LIU 12–8
21	March 3, 2014	Generoso Pope Athletic Complex	St. Francis	66–50	Sarah Benedetti (SFBK)	LIU 12–9
22	March 2, 2015	Steinberg Wellness Center	St. Francis	73–49	Sarah Benedetti (SFBK)	LIU 12–10
23	February 13, 2016	Generoso Pope Athletic Complex	LIU Brooklyn	62–65^{OT}	Shanice Vaughan (LIU)	LIU 13–10
24	January 14, 2017; ESPN3	Steinberg Wellness Center	St. Francis	56–54	Kat Phipps (SFBK)	LIU 13–11
25	February 17, 2018; ESPN3	Generoso Pope Athletic Complex	St. Francis	64–54	Jade Johnson (SFBK)	LIU 13–12
26	January 21, 2019; ESPN3	Steinberg Wellness Center	St. Francis	79–67	Jade Johnson (SFBK)	Tied 13–13
27	January 8, 2020; SNY	Generoso Pope Athletic Complex	St. Francis	88–63	Nevena Dimitrijevic (SFBK)	SFBK 14–13
28	January 28, 2021; ESPN+	Steinberg Wellness Center	St. Francis	66–53	Nevena Dimitrijevic (SFBK)	SFBK 15–13
29	February 11, 2022; NEC Front Row	Generoso Pope Athletic Complex	St. Francis	82–73	Alyssa Fisher & Isabella Posset (SFBK)	SFBK 16–13

== Men's soccer ==
Battle of Brooklyn
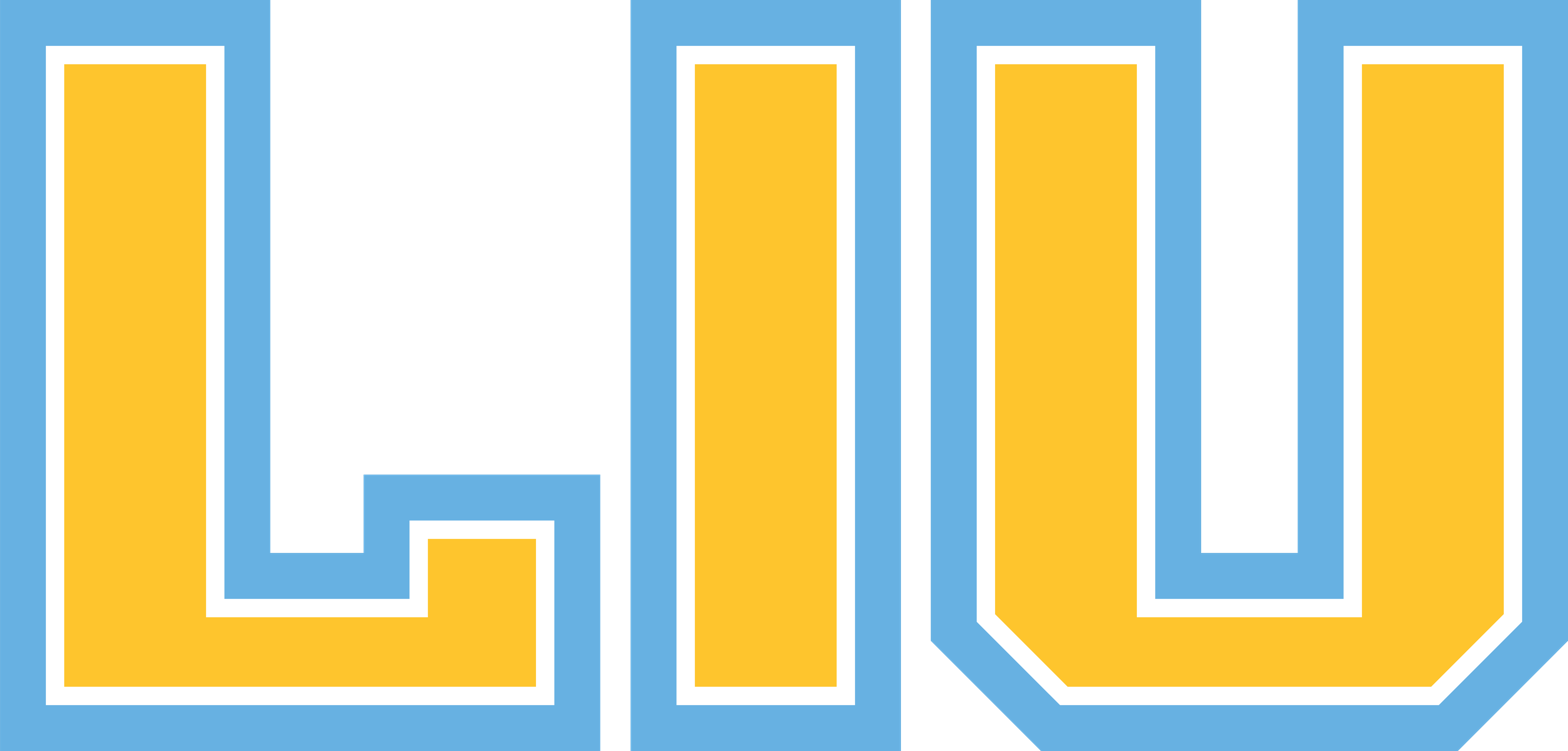
- St. Francis Brooklyn Terriers LIU Sharks
- Sport: Soccer
- First meeting: November 10, 2013; St. Francis 4, LIU Brooklyn 0
- Latest meeting: November 3, 2022; St. Francis 1, LIU 0 (Note: Most recent Battle of Brooklyn meeting; the most recent meeting overall was on November 6, 2022 in the Northeast Conference tournament quarterfinals, won by St. Francis 6–5 on penalties after being drawn at 1–1 after extra time.)
- Next meeting: TBA in 2023
- Trophy: Ramirez–Tramontozzi Trophy

Statistics
- Total meetings: 10
- All-time series: SFBK 5–4–1
- Largest victory: St. Francis 4–0 (November 10, 2013)
- Longest win streak: St. Francis, 2 (2013–2014, 2016–2017); LIU, 2 (2018–2019)
- Longest unbeaten streak: LIU, 4 (2018–2021)
- Current win streak: SFBK, 1 (2022–present)
- Current unbeaten streak: SFBK, 1 (2022–present)

Starting in 2013, the men's soccer programs for LIU Brooklyn and St. Francis College formalized their rivalry by naming their annual match a Battle of Brooklyn and awarding a trophy. The trophy is called the Ramirez–Tramontozzi trophy and recognizes former men's soccer coaches Arnie Ramirez and Carlos Tramontozzi, from LIU (Brooklyn) and St. Francis respectively. Both coaches were lifelong friends and greatly influenced their respective programs. St. Francis Brooklyn captured the inaugural trophy on LIU's field on November 10, 2013, behind a 4–0 performance. Since the 1970 season, when the two programs first met, LIU leads the overall series 25–23–4.

Since the LIU athletic merger, the men's soccer rivalry is no longer a Battle of Brooklyn in geographic terms, as LIU moved its unified men's soccer program to the Post campus.

=== Men's game results ===
LIU Brooklyn victories (2013–2018) shaded black ██. LIU victories (2019–present) are shaded gold ██. St. Francis victories are shaded blue ██.

Note that the 2013 men's soccer season, the first in which the "Battle of Brooklyn" name was applied to the rivalry, was also the first in which LIU's Brooklyn campus had officially adopted "LIU Brooklyn" as its athletic brand name.

#	Date	Site	Winner	Score	Series
1	November 10, 2013	LIU Soccer Field, Brooklyn	St. Francis	4–0	SFBK 1–0–0
2	November 9, 2014	Brooklyn Bridge Park, Pier 5	St. Francis	2–0	SFBK 2–0–0
3	November 8, 2015	LIU Soccer Field, Brooklyn	LIU Brooklyn	1–0	SFBK 2–1–0
4	November 6, 2016	Brooklyn Bridge Park, Pier 5	St. Francis	1–0	SFBK 3–1–0
5	November 3, 2017	LIU Soccer Field, Brooklyn	St. Francis	2–1 ^{OT}	SFBK 4–1–0
6	September 30, 2018	Brooklyn Bridge Park, Pier 5	LIU Brooklyn	2–1 ^{OT}	SFBK 4–2–0
7	November 10, 2019	LIU Soccer Park, Brookville	LIU	3–0	SFBK 4–3–0
8	April 12, 2021	Brooklyn Bridge Park, Pier 5	Draw	0–0	SFBK 4–3–1
9	November 7, 2021	LIU Soccer Park, Brookville	LIU	3–1	Tied 4–4–1
10	November 3, 2022	Brooklyn Bridge Park, Pier 5	St. Francis	1–0	SFBK 5–4–1

== See also ==
- College rivalry
