= Linda Cimino =

American basketball player and coach

Current position
- Title: Head coach
- Team: Dartmouth
- Conference: Ivy League
- Record: 7–19 (.269)

Biographical details
- Born: Lincoln, Rhode Island, U.S.

Playing career
- 1997–2001: Adelphi

Coaching career (HC unless noted)
- 2001–2005: Queensborough Community College
- 2005–2006: Adelphi (Asst.)
- 2006–2014: Caldwell
- 2014–2018: Binghamton
- 2018–2023: St. Francis Brooklyn
- 2023–present: Dartmouth

Head coaching record
- Overall: 116–164 (.414) (Division I); 126–100 (.558) (Division II)
- Tournaments: 0–0

Linda Cimino is an American basketball coach and former player, who is the current head coach of the Dartmouth Big Green women's basketball team. Cimino was born in Lincoln, Rhode Island and is an alumnus of North Smithfield High School (1997) and Adelphi University (B.A. 2001, M.A. 2004). Cimino began her head coaching career at Queensborough Community College in 2001 and was the 13th and last head coach of the St. Francis Brooklyn Terriers women's program. She had previously coached at both Caldwell and Binghamton.

== Coaching career ==
=== St. Francis Brooklyn Terriers ===
Cimino was formally announced as the head coach of the Terriers on May 21, 2018. She became the 13th head coach in program history. Previously, Cimino was the head coach at Binghamton. In Cimino's first year at the helm, she set the Terrier record for conference wins in a season, 12.

During the 2019–20 season, Cimino recorded her 200th career win on December 4.

With St. Francis eliminating all intercollegiate athletics following the 2022–23 season, she is the final women's basketball head coach in program history.

== Head coaching record ==
=== NCAA Division I ===
Record table
Season	Team	Overall	Conference	Standing	Postseason
Binghamton Bearcats (America East Conference) (2014–2018)
2014–15	Binghamton	4–26	2–14	T-8th	
2015–16	Binghamton	14–17	8–8	T-3rd	
2016–17	Binghamton	13–17	8–8	5th	
2017–18	Binghamton	20–12	10–6	T-3rd	
Binghamton Bearcats:		51–72 (.415)	28–36 (.438)		
St. Francis Brooklyn Terriers (Northeast Conference) (2018–2023)
2018–19	St. Francis Brooklyn	18–13	12–6	3rd	
2019–20	St. Francis Brooklyn	8–21	4–14	10th	
2020–21	St. Francis Brooklyn	4–10	4–10	9th	
2021–22	St. Francis Brooklyn	17–10	13–3	2nd	
2022–23	St. Francis Brooklyn	11–19	9–7	4th	
St. Francis Brooklyn:		58–73 (.443)	42–40 (.512)		
Dartmouth (Ivy League) (2023–present)
2023–24	Dartmouth	7–19	1–13	T–7th	
St. Francis Brooklyn:		7–19 (.269)	1–13 (.071)		
Total:		116–164 (.414)			
National champion Postseason invitational champion Conference regular season champion Conference regular season and conference tournament champion Division regular season champion Division regular season and conference tournament champion Conference tournament champion

=== NCAA Division II ===
Record table
Season	Team	Overall	Conference	Standing	Postseason
Caldwell Cougars (Central Atlantic Collegiate Conference) (2006–2014)
2006–07	Caldwell	10–17	8–14		
2007–08	Caldwell	18–12	10–7		
2008–09	Caldwell	10–18	8–10		
2009–10	Caldwell	15–12	11–8		
2010–11	Caldwell	21–6	16–3		
2011–12	Caldwell	17–11	13–6		
2012–13	Caldwell	19–12	15–4		
2013–14	Caldwell	18–12	14–5		
Caldwell Cougars:		126–100 (.558)	95–57 (.625)		
Total:		126–100 (.558)			
National champion Postseason invitational champion Conference regular season champion Conference regular season and conference tournament champion Division regular season champion Division regular season and conference tournament champion Conference tournament champion
