= Charlie Buscaglia =

American basketball coach (born 1979)

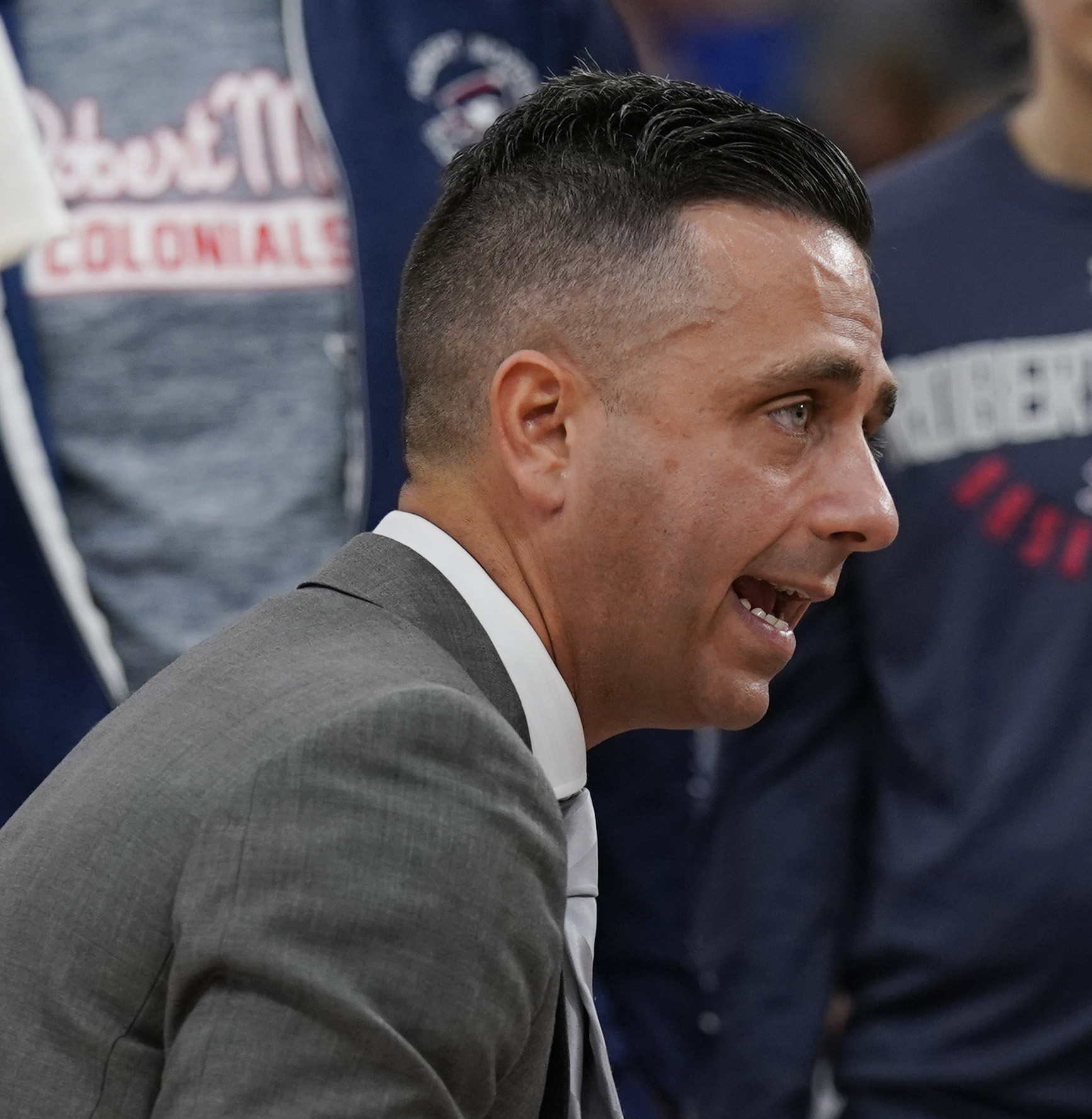
- Buscaglia in 2019

Biographical details
- Born: November 26, 1979 (age 46); Buffalo, New York, U.S.
- Education: Manhattan (2003)

Coaching career (HC unless noted)
- 1998–2003: Manhattan (asst.)
- 2003–2008: Robert Morris (asst.)
- 2008–2016: Robert Morris (assoc. HC)
- 2016–2024: Robert Morris

Head coaching record
- Overall: 127–102 (.555)

Accomplishments and honors

Championships
- NEC regular season (2017, 2018, 2019, 2020); NEC Tournament (2017, 2019)

Awards
- Brenda Reilly NEC Coach of the Year (2017, 2018, 2019, 2020); Best Coach in Pittsburgh Post-Gazette's College Basketball Decade in Review (2019)

Records
- Only coach in NEC history to win Coach of the Year four years in a row; Tied for the most Coach of the Year awards in NEC history; Most wins (22) for a first-year head coach in RMU history; School record for victories (25) in 2017–18 season; Fastest to 50 career wins (76 games) in RMU history

Charlie Buscaglia (born November 26, 1979) is an American college basketball coach and the former head coach of the Robert Morris Colonials women's basketball program. Before he succeeded his father, Sal, as head coach following the 2015–16 season, Buscaglia spent 13 years on the Colonials' coaching staff and previously assisted at his alma mater, Manhattan College.

== Coaching career ==
While enrolled at Manhattan, Buscaglia spent five seasons as an assistant under his father and was a part of the Jaspers' 2003 Metro Atlantic Athletic Conference (MAAC) championship and NCAA tournament team. He then moved onto Robert Morris prior to the 2003–04 season, spending five seasons as an assistant coach before being promoted to associate head coach in 2008–09. Between 2003–04 and 2004–05, the Colonials saw a 17-win increase from three to 20, which was then the third-largest turnaround in NCAA history. Buscaglia also served as head recruiter, bringing to Moon Township four Northeast Conference (NEC) Player of the Year recipients and 16 All-NEC honorees.

During his time as an assistant and associate head coach at Robert Morris, the Colonials claimed four NEC Tournament titles (2007, 2008, 2014, 2016) and participated in four NCAA Tournaments, the 2011 WNIT, and the 2012 WBI.

In his first season as head coach, Buscaglia guided the Colonials to their seventh NEC tournament championship and fifth NCAA Tournament appearance, finishing with an overall record of 22–11. He was named Brenda Reilly NEC Coach of the Year after Robert Morris captured sole possession of the NEC regular-season crown with a league mark of 14–4.

Buscaglia led the Colonials to a school-record 25 victories in the 2017–18 season, claiming a share of the NEC regular-season crown along with a berth in the Postseason WNIT. For his efforts, he was named Brenda Reilly NEC Coach of the Year, becoming just the third coach in league history to collect the plaudits in consecutive campaigns.

In 2018–19, Buscaglia led RMU to its sixth NCAA Tournament with a 65–54 victory over Saint Francis U in the NEC Championship Game. The win also gave the Colonials their eighth NEC Tournament title, which came off a third straight regular-season championship and seventh all-time. RMU finished the season at 22–11 overall and posted a 16–2 mark in conference - a record that included the program's best NEC start at 11–0. Buscaglia again claimed Brenda Reilly NEC Coach of the Year after guiding a team that featured 69.2 percent underclassmen to the league mountaintop, standing alone among the league's coaches as the only one to claim the award in three straight seasons.

In December 2019, the Pittsburgh Post-Gazette listed Buscaglia as Best Coach in its College Basketball Decade in Review. The fourth-year head coach took home his fourth consecutive Brenda Reilly NEC Coach of the Year honor - matching Bill Sheahan of Mount St. Mary's and Ed Swanson of Sacred Heart for the most in league history - as Robert Morris finished the 2019–20 season with a 23–7 record and 17–1 mark in conference play. The Colonials won their fourth consecutive NEC regular-season title and matched a program record for conference wins, tying the 2009–10 side that also went 17–1. RMU established new school standards for scoring defense (52.6), scoring margin (+12.4), and field goal percentage defense (.346), and ranked sixth in the NCAA in scoring defense, 10th in three-point field goal defense (.266), 11th in turnovers forced (21.17), 12th in field goal percentage defense, 17th in turnover margin (+5.57), and 20th in steals per game (10.7).

== Head coaching record ==
- Robert Morris
- Horizon

Record table
Season	Team	Overall	Conference	Standing	Postseason
Robert Morris Colonials (Northeast Conference) (2016–2020)
2016–17	Robert Morris	22–11	14–4	1st	NCAA first round
2017–18	Robert Morris	25–8	16–2	T–1st	WNIT first round
2018–19	Robert Morris	22–11	16–2	1st	NCAA first round
2019–20	Robert Morris	23–7	17–1	1st	Postseason cancelled due to the COVID-19 pandemic.
Robert Morris Colonials (Horizon League) (2020–2024)
2020–21	Robert Morris	4–13	4–12	9th	
2021–22	Robert Morris	14–15	11–11	9th	
2022–23	Robert Morris	11–19	5–15	10th	
2023–24	Robert Morris	6–18	2–13		
Robert Morris:		127–102 (.555)	85–61 (.582)		
Total:		127–102 (.555)			
National champion Postseason invitational champion Conference regular season champion Conference regular season and conference tournament champion Division regular season champion Division regular season and conference tournament champion Conference tournament champion
