= LIU Sharks women's basketball =

Basketball team representing Long Island University

2026–27 LIU Sharks women's basketball team
- University: Long Island University
- Head coach: Baronton Terry (1st season)
- Location: Brooklyn, New York
- Arena: Steinberg Wellness Center (capacity: 3,000)
- Conference: Northeast Conference
- Nickname: Sharks
- Colors: Blue and gold

NCAA Division I tournament appearances
- 2001

Conference tournament champions
- 2001

Conference regular-season champions
- 2007

The LIU Sharks women's basketball team represents Long Island University in NCAA Division I basketball competition. They play their home games at their Brooklyn Campus in the Steinberg Wellness Center and are members of the Northeast Conference. Their current head coach is Baronton Terry, who was hired in April 2026.

The LIU Sharks are the result of the July 1, 2019 unification of the athletic departments which had previously represented two separate campuses of LIU, the Division I LIU Brooklyn Blackbirds and the Division II LIU Post Pioneers.

== NCAA tournament results ==
As the Blackbirds, Long Island went to the NCAA Tournament once. Their record is 0-1.

Year	Seed	Round	Opponent	Result
2001	#16	First Round	#1 Connecticut	L 29-101
