= Fairleigh Dickinson Knights women's basketball =

American collegiate basketball team

2026–27 Fairleigh Dickinson Knights women's basketball team
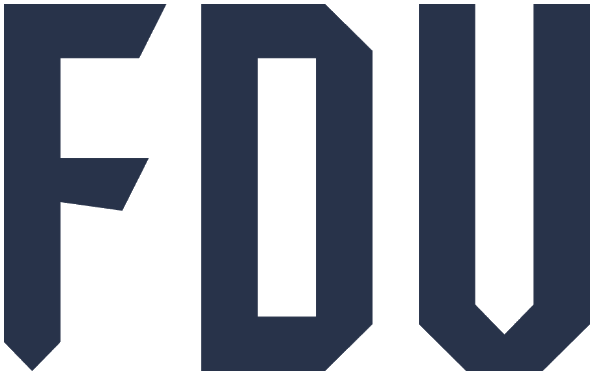
- University: Fairleigh Dickinson University
- Head coach: Stephanie Gaitley (4th season)
- Location: Hackensack, New Jersey
- Arena: Bogota Savings Bank Center (capacity: 1,852)
- Conference: Northeast Conference
- Nickname: Knights
- Colors: Burgundy and blue

NCAA Division I tournament appearances
- 2025, 2026

Conference tournament champions
- 1990, 1992, 2025, 2026

Conference regular-season champions
- 1993, 2022, 2023, 2025, 2026

Uniforms
Home	Away

The Fairleigh Dickinson Knights women's basketball team represents Fairleigh Dickinson University in women's college basketball. Their colors are burgundy, white, and blue. This mid-major team competes in the Northeast Conference. The Knights host opponents in the Bogota Savings Bank Center, which can seat up to 6,000, in Hackensack, New Jersey.

== History ==
The Fairleigh Dickinson Knights women's basketball team joined the Northeast Conference of Division I, in their 1988–89 season. Fairleigh Dickinson started play for women's basketball in 1988 with Sharon Beverly as head coach. They won the Northeast Tournament in 1990 and 1992 but as the NEC did not receive an auto-bid to the NCAA Tournament until 1994. After winning a share of the regular season title in the 1992-93 season, the Knights regressed dramatically in the next couple of years, finishing below .500 for the next eight seasons. The Knights did not finish better than 3rd place in the NEC until the 2021-22 season, when they won the regular season championship with a 15-3 record in conference play. They failed to win the NEC Tournament that year after being upset by Bryant in the Semifinals. Despite this, the Knights were invited to their first postseason tournament with the WNIT. They repeated as regular season champion the following year with a 16-3 record but lost 72-60 to Sacred Heart in the NEC Tournament Final. This was the last game for Angelika Szumilo as coach, as she left to coach Iona.

Stephanie Gaitley was hired to coach in 2023. They went 14-17 in her first season and lost in the NEC Semifinals before the team excelled in her second season, which saw them go 16-0 in NEC play while winning the most games for a season in school history with 27. In the 2025 Northeast Conference women's basketball tournament, due to the conference rules about reclassifying teams making the tournament final, the winner between Chicago State and Dickinson would win the NEC auto bid by default (in the semifinal matchup of reclassifying teams, Stonehill defeated Le Moyne). Dickinson won by a score of 90–61 to clinch a bid into the 2025 NCAA Tournament, their first in school history. They then beat Stonehill 66–49 to win the NEC Tournament and extended their school record to 29 wins for a single season.

== Yearly records ==
Record table
Season	Coach	Overall	Conference	Standing	Postseason
Sharon Beverly (1988–1999)
1988–89	Sharon Beverly	13–14	10–6	5th	
1989–90	Sharon Beverly	17–13	9–7	3rd	NEC Tournament Champs
1990–91	Sharon Beverly	11–16	8–8	7th	
1991–92	Sharon Beverly	23–6	13–3	2nd	NEC Tournament Champs
1992–93	Sharon Beverly	15–12	14–4	T–1st	
1993–94	Sharon Beverly	3–24	2–16	10th	
1994–95	Sharon Beverly	6–21	4–14	9th	
1995–96	Sharon Beverly	12–15	8–10	T–6th	
1996–97	Sharon Beverly	13–14	9–9	4th	
1997–98	Sharon Beverly	6–21	6–10	7th	
1998–99	Sharon Beverly	7–19	6–14	10th	
Sharon Beverly:		126–175 (.419)	89–101 (.468)		
Sandy Gordon Gaglioti (1988–1999)
1999–2000	Sandy Gordon Gaglioti	11–17	10–8	T–6th	
2000–01	Sandy Gordon Gaglioti	11–17	10–8	T–6th	
2001–02	Sandy Gordon Gaglioti	14–14	9–9	T–7th	
2002–03	Sandy Gordon Gaglioti	7–20	6–12	10th	
2003–04	Sandy Gordon Gaglioti	13–15	10–8	5th	
2004–05	Sandy Gordon Gaglioti	2–25	1–17	11th	
2005–06	Sandy Gordon Gaglioti	10–18	6–12	T–7th	
2006–07	Sandy Gordon Gaglioti	11–18	8–10	7th	
Sandy Gordon Gaglioti:		79–144 (.354)	60–84 (.417)		
Peter Cinella (2007–2019)
2008–09	Peter Cinella	13–17	9–9	5th	
2008–09	Peter Cinella	10–20	9–9	T–6th	
2009–10	Peter Cinella	9–20	5–13	11th	
2010–11	Peter Cinella	14–16	7–11	8th	
2011–12	Peter Cinella	13–18	8–10	8th	
2012–13	Peter Cinella	12–17	7–11	9th	
2013–14	Peter Cinella	3–26	2–16	10th	
2014–15	Peter Cinella	10–20	7–11	6th	
2015–16	Peter Cinella	11–21	8–10	6th	
2016–17	Peter Cinella	8–22	6–12	T-7th	
2017–18	Peter Cinella	15–15	7–11	T-7th	
2018–19	Peter Cinella	8–22	5–13	8th	
Peter Cinella:		126–234 (.350)	80–136 (.370)		
Angelika Szumilo (2019–present)
2019–20	Angelika Szumilo	12-17	9-9	4th	
2020–21	Angelika Szumilo	16-8	12-6	4th	
2021–22	Angelika Szumilo	19-12	15-3	1st	WNIT First Round
2022–23	Angelika Szumilo	24–8	16–3	1st	WNIT First Round
Angelika Szumilo:		72–45 (.615)	52–21 (.712)		
Stephanie Gaitley (2023–present)
2023–24	Stephanie Gaitley	14-17	11-5	3rd	
2024–25	Stephanie Gaitley	27-3	16-0	1st	
Total:		396–581 (.405)			
National champion Postseason invitational champion Conference regular season champion Conference regular season and conference tournament champion Division regular season champion Division regular season and conference tournament champion Conference tournament champion

== Postseason results ==
=== NCAA Division I ===
The Knights have appeared in the NCAA tournament twice. They have a record of 0–1.

Year	Seed	Round	Opponent	Result
2025	#15	First round	#2 TCU	L 51–73
2026	#15	First round	#2 Iowa	TBD

=== WNIT ===
The Knights have appeared in the Women's National Invitation Tournament twice. They have a record of 0–2.

Year	Round	Opponent	Result
2022	First Round	Seton Hall	L 45–67
2023	First Round	Columbia	L 53–69
