= India Pagán =

American basketball player

Personal information
- Born: January 7, 1999 (age 27) New London, Connecticut, U.S.
- Listed height: 6 ft 1 in (1.85 m)

Career information
- High school: New London (New London, Connecticut)
- College: Stony Brook (2017–2022)
- Position: Power forward / center

Career highlights
- First-team All-America East (2020); Second-team All-America East (2021–2022)
Medals
Women's basketball
Representing Puerto Rico
FIBA Women's AmeriCup
Silver medal – second place	2021 San Juan	Team
Pan American Games
Bronze medal – third place	2019 Lima	Team
Central American and Caribbean Games
Bronze medal – third place	2018 Barranquilla	Team

India Lee Pagán (born January 7, 1999) is an American college basketball player for the Stony Brook Seawolves of the America East Conference. She is also member of the Puerto Rican national team.

Pagán currently holds the Stony Brook program record for highest career field goal percentage at .512 (460-for-899). She helped Stony Brook reach the program's first NCAA tournament in 2021.

With Puerto Rico, Pagán participated at the 2019 FIBA Women's AmeriCup and 2021 FIBA Women's AmeriCup, winning a silver medal in 2021. She also played for Puerto Rico during the 2020 Summer Olympics in Tokyo, Japan.

== Early life and high school ==
Pagán was born in New London, Connecticut. Pagan began playing basketball at age 10 after her father signed her up to New London's local recreation league. She went to high school at Marine Science Magnet High School but was allowed to play high school basketball at New London High School because Marine Science Magnet High School did not have a basketball team. Pagán played for New London from 2014 to 2017. New London won a state championship in 2014 and 2017. In 2017, New London was the top-ranked team in the final Connecticut state polls and Pagán was named The Day's All-Area Girls' Basketball Player of the Year. New London went 66–10 in Pagán's three seasons.

The city of New London held a parade in 2021 to commemorate Pagán's appearance in the Tokyo Olympics.

== College career ==
Pagán signed with Stony Brook on November 9, 2016. She scored 8 points and 4 rebounds in her college debut against Manhattan on November 11, 2017. She was named America East Rookie of the Week on December 18, 2017. Pagán ended her freshman season averaging 5.8 points and 3.6 rebounds per game, starting in 15 of 29 games.

As a sophomore, Pagán started in all 30 games. She averaged 12.1 points and 6.0 rebounds per game, leading Stony Brook in rebounds, and scored over double digits in 23 games. Pagán scored 21 points against Vermont in the 2019 America East quarterfinals, then a career best, and was named to the All-Tournament team after averaging 18.5 points on 72% shooting in the postseason. Stony Brook finished 23–8 and lost in the semifinals to Hartford.

Before Pagán's junior season, she was named to the America East Preseason All-Conference Team. She was named America East Player of the Week on December 23, 2019, January 6, 2020 and February 3, 2020. Playing in the Puerto Rico Clasico, Pagán had a double-double against Morgan State on December 20, 2019. Pagán scored a career-high 26 points against Maine on January 5, 2020, making 13 field goals. At one point, Stony Brook had a nation-high 22-game winning streak and a 26–1 record. Pagán missed three games towards the end of the season but returned against Binghamton in the America East semifinals. Stony Brook finished 28–3 and was set to play Maine in the America East championship game before it was canceled as a result of the COVID-19 pandemic. Pagán was named first team All-America East, leading Stony Brook in scoring with 13.4 points per game and leading the conference with a .506 shooting percentage.

Pagán was named to the America East Preseason All-Conference Team again before her senior year. She scored her 1,000th point against New Hampshire on January 17, 2021. She was named second team All-America East, averaging 9.0 points per game and shooting .469. Stony Brook reached the NCAA Tournament for the first time after beating Maine in the America East finals. As a No. 14 seed, Stony Brook lost to eventual runners-up Arizona 79–44 in the first round.

Pagán was allowed to return to Stony Brook for a fifth year as the NCAA granted players an extra year of eligibility due to the COVID-19 pandemic. She was again an America East Preseason All-Conference selection. She was named second team All-America East for the second straight season. She ended the season averaging 12.2 points and 6.5 rebounds per game, shooting a career-high .582, 13th-best in the NCAA. Pagán ended her Stony Brook career with 1,418 points, the eighth-most in program history, and 729 rebounds, also eighth-most.

== Professional career ==
Pagán signed with the BC Pharmaserv Dolphins in Marburg, Germany after graduation for the 2022–23 season.

For the 2023–2024 season, Pagán signed with SBŠ Ostrava in the Czech Republic.

For the 2024–2025 season, Pagán signed with Iraklis Thessaloniki in the Greece.

== National team career ==
Pagán played for Puerto Rico's U18 team in the 2016 FIBA U18 Americas Championships in Chile. She played for Puerto Rico in the 2017 FIBA U19 Women's Basketball World Cup in Italy as well as the 2018 Central American and Caribbean Games.

Pagán participated at the 2019 FIBA Women's AmeriCup and 2021 FIBA Women's AmeriCup as Puerto Rico's center, winning a silver medal in 2021. Puerto Rico lost to the United States in the finals and Pagán combined to score 12 points in 5 games. She also played for Puerto Rico during the 2020 Summer Olympics in Tokyo, Japan, becoming the third Stony Brook player and first while active to participate in the Olympics. It was the first year that the Puerto Rican national team qualified for the Olympics. Puerto Rico was eliminated before the quarterfinals round, and Pagán combined to score six points and record six rebounds in nine combined minutes, playing in all three games.

Pagán also played in the 2022 FIBA Women's Basketball World Cup, where Puerto Rico advanced to the quarterfinals.

== Career statistics ==
Legend
GP	Games played	GS	Games started	MPG	Minutes per game	RPG	Rebounds per game
APG	Assists per game	SPG	Steals per game	BPG	Blocks per game	PPG	Points per game
TO	Turnovers per game	FG%	Field-goal percentage	3P%	3-point field-goal percentage	FT%	Free-throw percentage
**Bold**	Career best	°	League leader

Year	Team	GP	GS	MPG	FG%	3P%	FT%	RPG	APG	SPG	BPG	TO	PPG
2017–18	Stony Brook	29	15	17.9	.549	.000	.658	3.6	0.6	0.7	0.4	1.8	5.9
2018–19	Stony Brook	30	30	26.2	.524	.000	.671	6.0	**1.6**	**1.0**	0.6	**1.6**	12.1
2019–20	Stony Brook	28	27	**26.8**	.506	.000	.700	6.0	1.1	0.9	0.5	1.7	**13.4**
2020–21	Stony Brook	21	20	23.1	.469	.000	.691	5.0	0.9	0.7	0.3	1.8	9.6
2021–22	Stony Brook	27	27	25.9	**.582**	.000	**.806**	**6.5**	1.0	0.6	**1.0**	1.7	12.2
**Career**		135	119	24.0	.526	.000	.708	5.4	1.0	0.8	0.5	1.7	10.6

== Personal life ==
Pagán's parents, Carmen and Moises Pagán, were both born in Puerto Rico. Pagán has a younger sister named Taina.
