= 2018–19 New Hampshire Wildcats women's basketball team =

American college basketball season

2018–19 New Hampshire Wildcats women's basketball
- Conference: America East Conference
- Record: 6–24 (3–13 America East)
- Head coach: Maureen Magarity (9th season)
- Assistant coaches: Brendan Copes; Kelsey Hogan; Jade Singleton
- Home arena: Lundholm Gym

2018–19 America East Conference women's basketball standings
	Conf.				Overall
Team	W		L	PCT	W		L	PCT
Maine †	15	–	1	.938	25	–	8	.758
Hartford	14	–	2	.875	23	–	11	.676
Stony Brook	11	–	5	.688	23	–	8	.742
Albany	9	–	7	.563	13	–	18	.419
Binghamton	7	–	9	.438	12	–	18	.400
Vermont	7	–	9	.438	11	–	18	.379
UMBC	3	–	13	.188	10	–	20	.333
UMass Lowell	3	–	13	.188	7	–	22	.241
New Hampshire	3	–	13	.188	6	–	24	.200
† 2019 America East tournament winner

The 2018–19 New Hampshire Wildcats women's basketball team represented the University of New Hampshire during the 2018–19 NCAA Division I women's basketball season. The Wildcats, led by ninth-year head coach Maureen Magarity, played their home games in Lundholm Gym in Durham, New Hampshire and were members of the America East Conference.

== Media ==
All non-televised home games and conference road games streamed on either ESPN3 or AmericaEast.tv. Select home games aired on Fox College Sports, Live Well Network, or WBIN. Most road games streamed on the opponent's website. All conference home games and select non-conference home games were broadcast on the radio on WPKX, WGIR and online on the New Hampshire Portal.

== Roster ==
2018–19 New Hampshire Wildcats women's basketball team
Players
Coaches

Pos.	#	Name	Height	Year	Previous school	Hometown
G	2	Kari Brekke	5 ft 6 in (1.68 m)	Fr	Appleton North	Appleton, WI
G	3	Sarah Clement	5 ft 8 in (1.73 m)	Jr	Catherine McAuley	Falmouth, ME
F	4	Ivy Gogolin	6 ft 2 in (1.88 m)	Fr	Hopkinton	Hopkinton, MA
G	5	Amanda Torres	5 ft 7 in (1.7 m)	So	Proctor Academy	Andover, NH
G	10	Sarah Serbascewicz	5 ft 5 in (1.65 m)	Fr	Ledyard	Ledyard, CT
F/C	11	Ashley Storey	6 ft 3 in (1.91 m)	RS Jr	Greely	Cumberland, ME
F	14	Maggie Ahearn	6 ft 2 in (1.88 m)	RS So	Tabor Academy; Providence	Marshfield, MA
G/F	21	Alli Gribbin	5 ft 11 in (1.8 m)	Sr	Keller	Keller, TX
C	23	Mary Foster	6 ft 3 in (1.91 m)	Fr	Notre Dame	Elmira, NY
G	25	Mariah Gonzalez	5 ft 10 in (1.78 m)	Fr	Elmira	Watkins Glen, NY
F	32	Faith Bonett	6 ft 0 in (1.83 m)	Fr	Moorestown	Moorestown, NJ
G	33	Caroline Soucy	5 ft 9 in (1.75 m)	Jr	Marianapolis Prep	Beverly, MA
G	45	Kali Grimm	5 ft 9 in (1.75 m)	Fr	Central Norwood Young America	Norwood Young America, MN

Head coach

- Maureen Magarity (Marist)

Assistant coach(es)

- Brendan Copes (Marist)
- Kelsey Hogan (New Hampshire)
- Jade Singleton (Duquesne)

Legend

- (C) Team captain
- (S) Suspended
- (I) Ineligible
- (W) Walk-on
- Injured
- Current redshirt

Roster
Last update: September 15, 2024

== Schedule ==
Date time, TV	Rank^{#}	Opponent^{#}	Result	Record	Site (attendance) city, state
Non-conference regular season
November 9, 2018*; 9:00 p.m.		at Minnesota	L 47–70	0–1	Williams Arena (14,625); Minneapolis, MN
November 11, 2018*; 5:00 p.m.		at North Dakota State	L 51–56	0–2	Scheels Center (613); Fargo, ND
November 15, 2018*; 7:00 p.m., ESPN+		at Brown	L 70–76	0–3	Pizzitola Sports Center (205); Providence, RI
November 18, 2018*; 1:00 p.m., AETV		Sacred Heart	L 60–71	0–4	Lundholm Gym (207); Durham, NH
November 21, 2018*; 12:00 p.m., NESN		at Northeastern	L 54–69	0–5	Cabot Center (234); Boston, MA
November 25, 2018*; 1:00 p.m., AETV		Bryant	W 79–74	1–5	Lundholm Gym (267); Durham, NH
November 28, 2018*; 7:00 p.m.		at Boston University	L 39–60	1–6	Case Gym (284); Boston, MA
November 30, 2018*; 6:00 p.m.		at South Florida	L 36–79	1–7	Yuengling Center (4,992); Tampa, FL
December 6, 2018*; 7:00 p.m., AETV		New England	W 68–44	2–7	Lundholm Gym (213); Durham, NH
December 9, 2018*; 1:00 p.m., AETV		Holy Cross	W 74–62	3–7	Lundholm Gym (256); Durham, NH
December 16, 2018*; 1:00 p.m.		at Central Connecticut	L 47–56	3–8	William H. Detrick Gymnasium (703); New Britain, CT
December 21, 2018*; 11:00 a.m., ESPN+		Dartmouth; Rivalry	L 42–62	3–9	Lundholm Gym (1,557); Durham, NH
December 29, 2018*; 1:00 p.m., AETV		Princeton	L 42–90	3–10	Lundholm Gym (360); Durham, NH
America East regular season
January 2, 2019; 7:00 p.m., ESPN+		at Maine	L 46–67	3–11 (0–1)	Cross Insurance Center (1,541); Bangor, ME
January 5, 2019; 1:00 p.m., ESPN3		Binghamton	L 62–71	3–12 (0–2)	Lundholm Gym (167); Durham, NH
January 9, 2019; 7:00 p.m., ESPN+		at UMass Lowell	W 56–53	4–12 (1–2)	Tsongas Center (401); Lowell, MA
January 12, 2019; 1:00 p.m., ESPN3		Stony Brook	L 63–82	4–13 (1–3)	Lundholm Gym (314); Durham, NH
January 16, 2019; 7:00 p.m., ESPN+		at Vermont	L 60–69	4–14 (1–4)	Patrick Gym (378); Burlington, VT
January 23, 2019; 7:00 p.m., ESPN+		Hartford	L 48–66	4–15 (1–5)	Lundholm Gym (273); Durham, NH
January 26, 2019; 12:00 p.m., ESPN3		at UMBC	L 62–64	4–16 (1–6)	UMBC Event Center (503); Catonsville, MD
January 30, 2019; 11:00 a.m., ESPN+		at Albany	L 41–59	4–17 (1–7)	SEFCU Arena (1,911); Albany, NY
February 2, 2019; 1:00 p.m., ESPN3		Maine	L 45–69	4–18 (1–8)	Lundholm Gym (813); Durham, NH
February 6, 2019; 7:00 p.m., ESPN+		UMass Lowell	W 54–46	5–18 (2–8)	Lundholm Gym (186); Durham, NH
February 9, 2019; 2:00 p.m., ESPN3		at Binghamton	W 54–53	6–18 (3–8)	Binghamton University Events Center; Vestal, NY
February 13, 2019; 7:00 p.m., ESPN3		Vermont	L 50–51	6–19 (3–9)	Lundholm Gym (141); Durham, NH
February 16, 2019; 2:00 p.m., ESPN3		at Stony Brook	L 37–67	6–20 (3–10)	Island Federal Credit Union Arena (1,209); Stony Brook, NY
February 20, 2019; 7:00 p.m., ESPN+		at Hartford	L 49–56	6–21 (3–11)	Chase Arena at Reich Family Pavilion (522); West Hartford, CT
February 27, 2019; 12:00 p.m., ESPN+		Albany	L 53–78	6–22 (3–12)	Lundholm Gym (369); Durham, NH
March 2, 2019; 12:00 p.m., ESPN3		UMBC	L 47–55	6–23 (3–13)	Lundholm Gym (290); Durham, NH
America East women's tournament
March 6, 2019; 7:00 p.m., ESPN+	(8)	at (1) Maine; Quarterfinals	L 36–69	6–24	Cross Insurance Center (1,764); Bangor, ME
*Non-conference game. ^{#}Rankings from AP poll. (#) Tournament seedings in parentheses. All times are in Eastern.

== Rankings ==
Regular-season polls
Poll	Pre- season	Week 2	Week 3	Week 4	Week 5	Week 6	Week 7	Week 8	Week 9	Week 10	Week 11	Week 12	Week 13	Week 14	Week 15	Week 16	Week 17	Week 18	Week 19	Final
AP																				N/A
Coaches																				

Legend
	Increase in ranking
	Decrease in ranking
	No change
(RV)	Received votes

== See also ==
- 2018–19 New Hampshire Wildcats men's basketball team
