= 2020 America East women's basketball tournament =

American women's college basketball tournament

- Classification: Division I
- Season: 2019–20
- Teams: 8
- Site: Campus Sites
- Television: ESPNU/ESPN+
- America East women's basketball tournaments

2019–20 America East Conference women's basketball standings
	Conf.				Overall
Team	W		L	PCT	W		L	PCT
Stony Brook	14	–	2	.875	28	–	3	.903
Maine	12	–	4	.750	16	–	14	.533
UMass Lowell	11	–	5	.688	15	–	14	.517
Binghamton	10	–	6	.625	21	–	8	.724
New Hampshire	7	–	9	.438	10	–	18	.357
Vermont	6	–	10	.375	12	–	17	.414
UMBC	6	–	10	.375	10	–	17	.370
Albany	5	–	11	.313	9	–	20	.310
Hartford	1	–	15	.063	1	–	28	.034
† 2020 America East tournament winner Rankings from AP poll

The 2020 America East women's basketball tournament began on March 4 and was cancelled on March 12 prior to its scheduled conclusion. Maine was the defending champion. The winner would have advanced to the 2020 NCAA tournament which was also cancelled in efforts to curtail the spread of COVID-19.

== Seeds ==
Teams are seeded by record within the conference, with a tiebreaker system to seed teams with identical conference records.

Seed	School	Conf	Overall	Tiebreaker
1	Stony Brook	15–1	26–3	
2	Maine	12–4	16–14	
3	UMass Lowell	11–5	15–14	
4	Binghamton	10–6	21–8	
5	New Hampshire	7–9	10–18	
6	UMBC	6–10	10–17	1–1 vs. Maine
7	Vermont	6–10	12–17	0–2 vs. Maine
8	Albany	5–11	9–20	
DNQ	Hartford	1–15	1–28	

== Schedule ==
All tournament games are nationally televised on an ESPN network:

Game	Time*	Matchup^{#}	Television	Attendance
Quarterfinals – Wednesday, March 4
1	6:30 pm	#8 Albany at #1 Stony Brook	ESPN+	940
2	7:00 pm	#7 Vermont at #2 Maine	ESPN+	1,310
3	7:00 pm	#6 UMBC at #3 UMass Lowell	ESPN+	593
4	7:00 pm	#5 New Hampshire at #4 Binghamton	ESPN+	1,522
Semifinals – Sunday, March 8
5	1:00 pm	#3 UMass Lowell at #2 Maine	ESPN+	1,336
6	4:00 pm	#4 Binghamton at #1 Stony Brook	ESPN+	1,142
Championship Game – Friday, March 13
7	5:00 pm	#2 Maine at #1 Stony Brook	ESPNU	CANCELLED
*Game Times in EST. #-Rankings denote tournament seeding.

== Bracket and Results ==
Teams are reseeded after each round with highest remaining seeds receiving home court advantage.

Quarterfinals; Wednesday, March 4, 2020; ESPN+
1	Stony Brook	54*
8	Albany	49
4	Binghamton	51
5	New Hampshire	42
(Pairings are reseeded after the first round)
2	Maine	78
7	Vermont	66
3	UMass Lowell	66
6	UMBC	58

Semifinals; Sunday, March 8, 2020; ESPN+
1	Stony Brook	57
4	Binghamton	42
2	Maine	67
3	UMass Lowell	54

Championship Game; Friday, March 13, 2020; ESPNU
1	Stony Brook
2	Maine

* denotes number of overtime periods

All times listed are Eastern

== See also ==
- 2020 America East men's basketball tournament
