= 2018–19 Binghamton Bearcats women's basketball team =

American college basketball season

2018–19 Binghamton Bearcats women's basketball
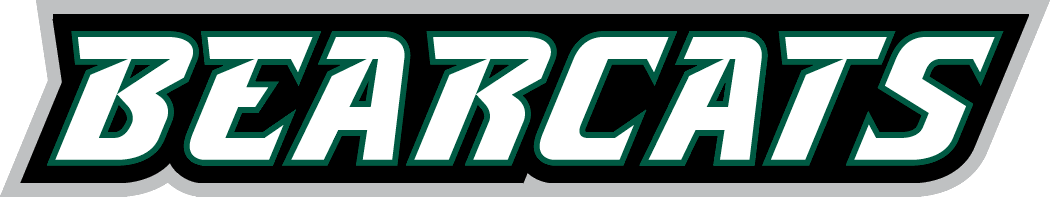
- Conference: America East Conference
- Record: 12–18 (7–9 America East)
- Head coach: Bethann Ord (1st season)
- Assistant coaches: Devan Newman; Megan Shoniker (1st season); Matt Thune
- Home arena: Binghamton University Events Center

2018–19 America East Conference women's basketball standings
	Conf.				Overall
Team	W		L	PCT	W		L	PCT
Maine †	15	–	1	.938	25	–	8	.758
Hartford	14	–	2	.875	23	–	11	.676
Stony Brook	11	–	5	.688	23	–	8	.742
Albany	9	–	7	.563	13	–	18	.419
Binghamton	7	–	9	.438	12	–	18	.400
Vermont	7	–	9	.438	11	–	18	.379
UMBC	3	–	13	.188	10	–	20	.333
UMass Lowell	3	–	13	.188	7	–	22	.241
New Hampshire	3	–	13	.188	6	–	24	.200
† 2019 America East tournament winner

The 2018–19 Binghamton Bearcats women's basketball team represented Binghamton University during the 2018–19 NCAA Division I women's basketball season. The Bearcats, led by first-year head coach Bethann Ord, played their home games at Binghamton University Events Center in Binghamton, New York as members of the America East Conference.

== Media ==
All home games and conference road games streamed on either ESPN3 or AmericaEast.tv. Most road games streamed on the opponent's website. All games were broadcast on the radio on WNBF and streamed online.

== Roster ==
2018–19 Binghamton Bearcats women's basketball team
Players
Coaches

Pos.	#	Name	Height	Year	Previous school	Hometown
G	3	Kai Moon	5 ft 6 in (1.68 m)	Jr	Nequa Valley	Bolingbrook, IL
G/F	4	Annie Ramil	6 ft 0 in (1.83 m)	Fr	Binghamton	Binghamton, NY
G	5	Hayley Moore	5 ft 6 in (1.68 m)	Fr	Red Bank Catholic	Marlboro, NJ
F	13	Kennedi Thompson	6 ft 0 in (1.83 m)	Sr	Gloucester Catholic	Mullica Hill, NJ
C	14	Payton Husson	6 ft 4 in (1.93 m)	RS So	Marysville	Marysville, MI
G/F	21	Karlee Krchnavi	6 ft 0 in (1.83 m)	Jr	Palisades	Quakertown, PA
F	22	Lizzy Spindler	5 ft 8 in (1.73 m)	So	Riverside	Taylor, PA
G	23	Bailey Williams	5 ft 10 in (1.78 m)	RS So	Dublin Jerome	Dublin, OH
F	24	Olivia Ramil	6 ft 2 in (1.88 m)	RS So	Binghamton; Georgetown	Binghamton, NY
F	31	Corrinne Godshall	5 ft 11 in (1.8 m)	RS Jr	Central Bucks West	Doylestown, PA
G	32	Carly Boland	6 ft 0 in (1.83 m)	Jr	Shenendehowa	Clifton Park, NY
G	33	Rebecca Carmody	5 ft 8 in (1.73 m)	Sr	Western Wayne	Waymart, PA
F	50	Kaylee Wasco	6 ft 3 in (1.91 m)	So	H.H. Dow	Midland, MI

Head coach

- Bethann Ord (UMBC)

Assistant coach(es)

- Devan Newman (Louisville)
- Megan Shoniker (Rhode Island)
- Matt Thune (Indiana)

Legend

- (C) Team captain
- (S) Suspended
- (I) Ineligible
- (W) Walk-on
- Injured
- Current redshirt

Roster
Last update: November 4, 2024

== Schedule ==
Date time, TV	Rank^{#}	Opponent^{#}	Result	Record	Site (attendance) city, state
Exhibition
October 30, 2018; 7:00 p.m.		Bloomsburg	W 63–34		Binghamton University Events Center; Vestal, NY
Non-conference regular season
November 6, 2018*; 5:30 p.m., ESPN3		Charleston (WV)	W 69–62	1–0	Binghamton University Events Center (2,108); Vestal, NY
November 9, 2018*; 5:30 p.m., ESPN3		Cornell	W 72–61	2–0	Binghamton University Events Center (2,509); Vestal, NY
November 11, 2018*; 2:00 p.m.		at Lafayette	L 50–59	2–1	Kirby Sports Center (668); Easton, PA
November 15, 2018*; 11:00 a.m., ESPN+		at Ohio	L 49–86	2–2	Convocation Center (2,167); Athens, OH
November 18, 2018*; 2:00 p.m., ESPN+		Caldwell	W 73–54	3–2	Binghamton University Events Center (1,139); Vestal, NY
November 21, 2018*; 1:00 p.m., ESPN+		Lehigh	L 55–65	3–3	Binghamton University Events Center (1,016); Vestal, NY
November 25, 2018*; 2:00 p.m., ESPN+		Army	W 60–47	4–3	Binghamton University Events Center (1,007); Vestal, NY
November 30, 2018*; 7:00 p.m., ESPN+		Fairleigh Dickinson	W 73–54	5–3	Binghamton University Events Center (1,202); Vestal, NY
December 5, 2018*; 7:00 p.m.		at Niagara	L 72–79	5–4	Gallagher Center (360); Lewiston, NY
December 8, 2018*; 12:00 p.m., ESPN+		Rider	L 57–62	5–5	Binghamton University Events Center (2,748); Vestal, NY
December 16, 2018*; 1:00 p.m., ACCNX		at No. 2 Notre Dame	L 53–103	5–6	Edmund P. Joyce Center (8,183); South Bend, IN
December 17, 2018*; 8:00 p.m.		at No. 19 Marquette	L 40–93	5–7	Al McGuire Center (920); Milwaukee, WI
December 31, 2018*; 2:00 p.m., ESPN+		at Dartmouth	L 39–63	5–8	Leede Arena (547); Hanover, NH
America East regular season
January 2, 2019; 7:00 p.m., ESPN3		at Albany	L 56–61	5–9 (0–1)	SEFCU Arena (854); Albany, NY
January 5, 2019; 1:00 p.m., ESPN3		at New Hampshire	W 71–62	6–9 (1–1)	Lundholm Gym (167); Durham, NH
January 9, 2019; 7:00 p.m., ESPN3		Stony Brook	L 56–65	6–10 (1–2)	Binghamton University Events Center (1,517); Vestal, NY
January 16, 2019; 7:00 p.m., ESPN3		UMBC	W 67–45	7–10 (2–2)	Binghamton University Events Center (1,389); Vestal, NY
January 19, 2019; 12:00 p.m., ESPN3		Vermont	L 57–58	7–11 (2–3)	Binghamton University Events Center (1,565); Vestal, NY
January 23, 2019; 11:00 a.m., ESPN3		at UMass Lowell	W 70–50	8–11 (3–3)	Tsongas Center (3,819); Lowell, MA
January 27, 2019; 12:00 p.m., ESPN+		at Maine	L 57–58	8–12 (3–4)	Cross Insurance Center (2,180); Bangor, ME
January 30, 2019; 7:00 p.m., ESPN3		Hartford	W 73–62	9–12 (4–4)	Binghamton University Events Center (1,101); Vestal, NY
February 2, 2019; 2:00 p.m., ESPN3		Albany	L 62–71	9–13 (4–5)	Binghamton University Events Center (1,799); Vestal, NY
February 6, 2019; 7:00 p.m., ESPN3		at Stony Brook	L 53–68	9–14 (4–6)	Island Federal Credit Union Arena (1,002); Stony Brook, NY
February 9, 2019; 2:00 p.m., ESPN3		New Hampshire	L 53–54	9–15 (4–7)	Binghamton University Events Center; Vestal, NY
February 13, 2019; 7:00 p.m., ESPN+		at UMBC	W 58–46	10–15 (5–7)	UMBC Event Center (320); Catonsville, MD
February 20, 2019; 7:00 p.m., ESPN+		UMass Lowell	W 58–53	11–15 (6–7)	Binghamton University Events Center (1,269); Vestal, NY
February 23, 2019; 2:00 p.m., ESPN3		at Vermont	W 59–50	12–15 (7–7)	Patrick Gym (599); Burlington, VT
February 27, 2019; 7:00 p.m., ESPN+		at Hartford	L 50–63	12–16 (7–8)	Chase Arena at Reich Family Pavilion (589); West Hartford, CT
March 2, 2019; 12:00 p.m., ESPN3		Maine	L 60–67	12–17 (7–9)	Binghamton University Events Center (1,501); Vestal, NY
America East women's tournament
March 6, 2019; 7:00 p.m., ESPN+	(5)	at (4) Albany; Quarterfinals	L 56–61	12–18	SEFCU Arena (472); Albany, NY
*Non-conference game. ^{#}Rankings from AP poll. (#) Tournament seedings in parentheses. All times are in Eastern.

== See also ==
- 2018–19 Binghamton Bearcats men's basketball team
