= 2019–20 UMass Lowell River Hawks women's basketball team =

Intercollegiate basketball season

2019–20 UMass Lowell River Hawks women's basketball
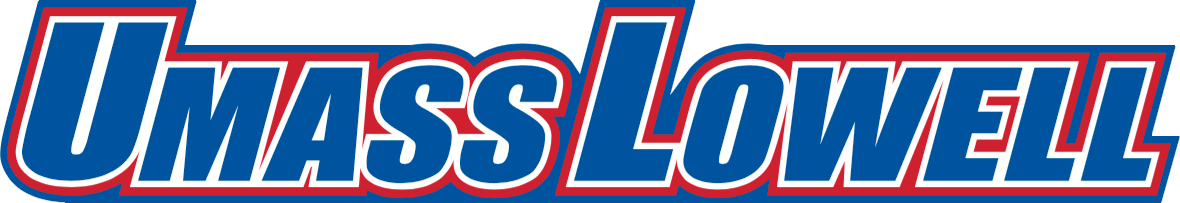
- Conference: America East Conference
- Record: 15–14 (11–5 America East)
- Head coach: Tom Garrick (2nd season)
- Assistant coaches: Denise King; Stefanie Murphy; Taryn Johnson
- Home arena: Costello Athletic Center; Tsongas Center

2019–20 America East Conference women's basketball standings
	Conf.				Overall
Team	W		L	PCT	W		L	PCT
Stony Brook	14	–	2	.875	28	–	3	.903
Maine	12	–	4	.750	16	–	14	.533
UMass Lowell	11	–	5	.688	15	–	14	.517
Binghamton	10	–	6	.625	21	–	8	.724
New Hampshire	7	–	9	.438	10	–	18	.357
Vermont	6	–	10	.375	12	–	17	.414
UMBC	6	–	10	.375	10	–	17	.370
Albany	5	–	11	.313	9	–	20	.310
Hartford	1	–	15	.063	1	–	28	.034
† 2020 America East tournament winner Rankings from AP poll

The 2019–20 UMass Lowell River Hawks women's basketball team represented the University of Massachusetts Lowell during the 2019–20 NCAA Division I women's basketball season. The River Hawks were led by second year head coach Tom Garrick and played most their home games in the Costello Athletic Center while select games were played in the Tsongas Center at UMass Lowell. They were members of the America East Conference. They finished the season 15–14, 11–5 in America East play to finish in third place.

== Media ==
All non-televised home games and conference road games will stream on either ESPN3 or AmericaEast.tv. Most road games will stream on the opponents website.

== Roster ==
2019–20 UMass Lowell River Hawks women's basketball team
Players
Coaches

Pos.	#	Name	Height	Year	Previous school	Hometown
G	1	Felicia Korte	5 ft 11 in (1.8 m)	RS Jr	Watertown	Watertown, MA
G	2	Kalkidan Mamo	5 ft 4 in (1.63 m)	Fr	Cambridge	Cambridge, MA
G	3	Jaliena Sanchez	5 ft 6 in (1.68 m)	Fr	Springfield Central	Springfield, MA
G	4	Linda Svenne	5 ft 9 in (1.75 m)	Jr	Riga State Gymnasium No. 3	Riga, Latvia
G	5	Kharis Idom	5 ft 8 in (1.73 m)	So	Colonial	Orlando, FL
G	10	Ren'Cia Rolling	5 ft 2 in (1.57 m)	Sr	Seton Academy	Lansing, IL
G	13	Kaylen Banwareesingh	6 ft 0 in (1.83 m)	Fr	Monsignor Scanlan	Bronx, NY
F	14	Brianne Stiers	5 ft 11 in (1.8 m)	Sr	Highlands Ranch HS	Denver, CO
F	15	Chasidey Willis	5 ft 10 in (1.78 m)	Jr	Mumford	Detroit, MI
F	23	Niya Johnson	6 ft 1 in (1.85 m)	RS Jr	Nazareth Regional	Brooklyn, NY
F	25	Denise Solis	6 ft 1 in (1.85 m)	Fr	Windsor HS	Windsor, CT
G	32	Shamyjha Price	5 ft 7 in (1.7 m)	Fr	Bishop Canevin HS	Pittsburgh, PA
F	33	Tiahna Sears	5 ft 10 in (1.78 m)	Jr	Bunbury Catholic College	Bunbury, Australia
G		Megan Hendrick	5 ft 9 in (1.75 m)	Sr	Thomas Edison	Alexandria, VA

Head coach

- Tom Garrick (Rhode Island)

Assistant coach(es)

- Denise King (Rhode Island)
- Stefanie Murphy (Boston College)
- Taryn Johnson (Fairfield)

Legend

- (C) Team captain
- (S) Suspended
- (I) Ineligible
- (W) Walk-on
- Injured
- Current redshirt

Roster

== Schedule ==
Date time, TV	Rank^{#}	Opponent^{#}	Result	Record	Site (attendance) city, state
Non-conference regular season
Nov 5, 2019*; 7:00 pm, ACCNX		at Boston College	L 46–89	0–1	Conte Forum (216); Chestnut Hill, MA
Nov 10, 2019*; 2:00 pm		at Colgate	L 51–73	0–2	Cotterell Court (411); Hamilton, NY
Nov 14, 2019*; 7:00 pm		Massachusetts; Kennedy Cup Challenge	L 58–74	0–3	Tsongas Center (676); Lowell, MA
Nov 17, 2019*; 2:00 pm, ESPN+		at Kansas	L 44–79	0–4	Allen Fieldhouse (1,420); Lawrence, KS
Nov 21, 2019*; 7:00 pm		Yale	L 59–67	0–5	Costello Athletic Center (294); Lowell, MA
Nov 24, 2019*; 6:00 pm		at Providence	L 38–63	0–6	Alumni Hall (225); Providence, RI
Nov 27, 2019*; 2:00 pm		Cornell	L 56–70	0–7	Costello Athletic Center (107); Lowell, MA
Dec 2, 2019*; 5:00 pm		at Bryant	W 55–35	1–7	Chace Athletic Center (1); Smithfield, RI
Dec 5, 2019*; 7:00 pm		at Central Connecticut	W 56–54	2–7	Detrick Gym (857); New Britain, CT
Dec 8, 2019*; 1:00 pm, ESPN3		LIU	W 65–56	3–7	Tsongas Center (322); Lowell, MA
Dec 13, 2019*; 7:00 pm, ESPN+		Dartmouth	L 51–62	3–8	Costello Athletic Center (454); Lowell, MA
Dec 21, 2019*; 1:00 pm		at Merrimack	L 50–73	3–9	Hammel Court (566); North Andover, MA
Dec 29, 2019*; 2:00 pm, ESPN3		Fairleigh Dickinson	W 61–56 ^{OT}	4–9	Costello Athletic Center (102); Lowell, MA
America East regular Season
Jan 2, 2020; 7:00 pm, ESPN+		New Hampshire	W 58–53	5–9 (1–0)	Costello Athletic Center (230); Lowell, MA
Jan 5, 2020; 12:00 pm, ESPN+		UMBC	W 75–64	6–9 (2–0)	Costello Athletic Center (221); Lowell, MA
Jan 8, 2020; 7:00 pm, ESPN+		at Hartford	W 68–63	7–9 (3–0)	Chase Arena at Reich Family Pavilion (466); West Hartford, CT
Jan 11, 2020; 2:00 pm, ESPN3		at Binghamton	W 66–56	8–9 (4–0)	Binghamton University Events Center (1,676); Vestal, NY
Jan 15, 2020; 11:00 am, NESN/ESPN3		Maine	W 66–57	9–9 (5–0)	Tsongas Center (3,133); Lowell, MA
Jan 22, 2020; 7:00 pm, ESPN+		Albany	W 53–51	10–9 (6–0)	Tsongas Center (1,002); Lowell, MA
Jan 25, 2020; 11:00 am, ESPN3		Vermont	W 61–47	11–9 (7–0)	Costello Athletic Center (379); Lowell, MA
Jan 29, 2020; 6:30 pm, ESPN+		at Stony Brook	L 41–60	11–10 (7–1)	Island Federal Credit Union Arena (845); Stony Brook, NY
Feb 1, 2020; 12:00 pm, ESPN3		at New Hampshire	W 66–53	12–10 (8–1)	Lundholm Gym (393); Durham, NH
Feb 5, 2020; 7:00 pm, ESPN+		Stony Brook	L 69–89	12–11 (8–2)	Tsongas Center (471); Lowell, MA
Feb 8, 2020; 12:00 pm		UMBC	L 52–65	12–12 (8–3)	UMBC Event Center (330); Baltimore, MD
Feb 12, 2020; 7:00 pm, ESPN+		Maine	L 53–77	12–13 (8–4)	Cross Insurance Center (1,267); Bangor, ME
Feb 15, 2020; 1:00 pm, ESPN3		Hartford	W 64–56	13–13 (9–4)	Tsongas Center (1,346); Lowell, MA
Feb 19, 2020; 7:00 pm, ESPN+		Binghamton	L 58–62	13–14 (9–5)	Costello Athletic Center (431); Lowell, MA
Feb 26, 2020; 7:00 pm, ESPN+		at Albany	W 78–75	14–14 (10–5)	SEFCU Arena (867); Albany, NY
Feb 29, 2020; 2:00 pm, ESPN3		at Vermont	W 62–58	15–14 (11–5)	Patrick Gym (645); Burlington, VT
America East Women's Tournament
03/04/2020; 7:00 pm, ESPN+	(3)	(6) UMBC; Quarterfinals	W 66–58	16–14	Tsongas Center (593); Lowell, MA
03/8/2020; 1:00 pm, ESPN+	(3)	at (2) Maine; Semifinals	L 54–67	16–15	Memorial Gym (1,336); Orono, ME
*Non-conference game. ^{#}Rankings from AP Poll. (#) Tournament seedings in parentheses. All times are in Eastern Time.

== See also ==
- 2019–20 UMass Lowell River Hawks men's basketball team
