= 2018–19 Hartford Hawks women's basketball team =

Intercollegiate basketball season

2018–19 Hartford Hawks women's basketball

WNIT, first round
- Conference: America East Conference
- Record: 23–11 (14–2 America East)
- Head coach: Kim McNeill (3rd season)
- Assistant coaches: Cory McNeill; Steve Pogue; Ali Heller
- Home arena: Chase Arena at Reich Family Pavilion

2018–19 America East Conference women's basketball standings
	Conf.				Overall
Team	W		L	PCT	W		L	PCT
Maine †	15	–	1	.938	25	–	8	.758
Hartford	14	–	2	.875	23	–	11	.676
Stony Brook	11	–	5	.688	23	–	8	.742
Albany	9	–	7	.563	13	–	18	.419
Binghamton	7	–	9	.438	12	–	18	.400
Vermont	7	–	9	.438	11	–	18	.379
UMBC	3	–	13	.188	10	–	20	.333
UMass Lowell	3	–	13	.188	7	–	22	.241
New Hampshire	3	–	13	.188	6	–	24	.200
† 2019 America East tournament winner

The 2018–19 Hartford Hawks women's basketball team represented the University of Hartford during the 2018–19 NCAA Division I women's basketball season. The Hawks, led by third-year head coach Kim McNeill, played their home games in the Chase Arena at Reich Family Pavilion in West Hartford, Connecticut and were members of the America East Conference. They finished the season 23–11, 14–2 in American East play, to finish in second place. They advanced to the championship game of the America East women's tournament where they lost to Maine. They received an automatic bid to the Women's National Invitation Tournament where they lost to Providence in the first round.

== Media ==
All home games and conference road games were streamed on either ESPN3 or AmericaEast.tv. Most road games were streamed on the opponents' websites. All games were broadcast on the radio on WWUH.

== Roster ==
2018–19 Hartford Hawks women's basketball team
Players
Coaches

Pos.	#	Name	Height	Year	Previous school	Hometown
G	1	Jordan McLemore	5 ft 8 in (1.73 m)	Fr	Lodi	Palisades Park, NJ
G	2	Sierra DaCoasta	5 ft 9 in (1.75 m)	Jr	Bishop McDevitt	Philadelphia, PA
G	3	Jada Lucas	5 ft 5 in (1.65 m)	So	New London	New London, CT
G	4	Jade Young	5 ft 11 in (1.8 m)	So	Abington Friends School	Philadelphia, PA
G	5	Lindsey Abed	5 ft 6 in (1.68 m)	Sr	Oakton	Oakton, VA
F	10	Ella Awobajo	6 ft 1 in (1.85 m)	RS Sr	Neumann-Goretti; Boston College	Kaduna, Nigeria
G	11	Liz Garcia	5 ft 10 in (1.78 m)	So	Academy of the Holy Angels	Teaneck, NJ
F	12	Lawrencia Moten	6 ft 2 in (1.88 m)	Jr	Bullis School; Chipola College	Bowie, MD
G/F	13	Kelly Douglass	5 ft 10 in (1.78 m)	Sr	Clifton	Clifton, NJ
F	21	Charlette Leurs	6 ft 2 in (1.88 m)	Fr	Bronx River - Lehman Campus	The Bronx, NY
G	23	Alexia Douglas	5 ft 7 in (1.7 m)	Sr	Brentwood; ASA Junior College	Bay Shore, NY
G	32	Jabria Ingram	5 ft 8 in (1.73 m)	Fr	Neumann-Goretti	Upper Darby, PA
F	33	Azariah Wade	6 ft 0 in (1.83 m)	Fr	Bishop Grimes	Syracuse, NY
F	40	Sierra Smith	6 ft 0 in (1.83 m)	Fr	St. Anne's-Belfield School	Madison, VA
F/C	44	Brielle Wilborn	6 ft 3 in (1.91 m)	So	Middletown	Middletown, CT

Head coach

- Kim McNeill (Richmond)

Assistant coach(es)

- Cory McNeill (Morgan State)
- Steve Pogue (Nyack)
- Ali Heller (Rider)

Legend

- (C) Team captain
- (S) Suspended
- (I) Ineligible
- (W) Walk-on
- Injured
- Current redshirt

Roster
Last update: August 17, 2024

== Schedule ==
Date time, TV	Rank^{#}	Opponent^{#}	Result	Record	Site (attendance) city, state
Non-conference regular season
November 7, 2018*; 7:00 p.m.		at Villanova	L 41–59	0–1	Finneran Pavilion (845); Villanova, PA
November 9, 2018*; 7:00 p.m., ESPN+		Morgan State; Preseason WNIT first round	W 80–59	1–1	Chase Arena at Reich Family Pavilion (665); West Hartford, CT
November 11, 2018*; 1:00 p.m., ACCNX		at No. 25 Miami (FL); Preseason WNIT quarterfinals	L 62–75	1–2	Watsco Center (783); Coral Gables, FL
November 18, 2018*; 4:00 p.m.		at New Mexico; Preseason WNIT consolation round	L 65–72	1–3	Dreamstyle Arena (4,330); Albuquerque, NM
November 21, 2018*; 12:00 p.m., ESPN+		Harvard	W 73–60	2–3	Chase Arena at Reich Family Pavilion (478); West Hartford, CT
November 23, 2018*; 3:00 p.m.		vs. Southern Illinois; South Point Thanksgiving Shootout	L 50–72	2–4	South Point Arena (586); Enterprise, NV
November 24, 2018*; 3:00 p.m.		vs. No. 5 Louisville; South Point Thanksgiving Shootout	L 69–86	2–5	South Point Arena (989); Enterprise, NV
November 30, 2018*; 7:00 p.m., ESPN+		William & Mary	W 50–45	3–5	Chase Arena at Reich Family Pavilion (649); West Hartford, CT
December 9, 2018*; 2:00 p.m., ESPN+		Bryant	W 67–57	4–5	Chase Arena at Reich Family Pavilion (676); West Hartford, CT
December 11, 2018*; 7:00 p.m.		at Rhode Island	W 65–51	5–5	Ryan Center (287); Kingston, RI
December 16, 2018*; 2:00 p.m., ESPN+		No. 23 Michigan State	L 66–74 ^{OT}	5–6	Chase Arena at Reich Family Pavilion (1,179); West Hartford, CT
December 21, 2018*; 7:00 p.m., ESPN+		Princeton	L 38–75	5–7	Chase Arena at Reich Family Pavilion (546); West Hartford, CT
December 28, 2018*; 7:00 p.m.		at Central Connecticut; Rivalry	W 54–52	6–7	William H. Detrick Gymnasium (417); New Britain, CT
December 30, 2018*; 2:00 p.m., ESPN+		at NJIT	W 84–53	7–7	Wellness and Events Center (402); Newark, NJ
America East regular season
January 2, 2019; 7:00 p.m., ESPN+		at Stony Brook	W 64–36	8–7 (1–0)	Island Federal Credit Union Arena (205); Stony Brook, NY
January 9, 2019; 7:00 p.m., ESPN+		at UMBC	W 66–52	9–7 (2–0)	UMBC Event Center (426); Catonsville, MD
January 12, 2019; 2:00 p.m., ESPN3		Vermont	W 62–31	10–7 (3–0)	Chase Arena at Reich Family Pavilion (562); West Hartford, CT
January 16, 2019; 7:00 p.m., ESPN3		Maine	W 49–46	11–7 (4–0)	Chase Arena at Reich Family Pavilion (566); West Hartford, CT
January 19, 2019; 1:00 p.m., ESPN3		at UMass Lowell	W 66–44	12–7 (5–0)	Costello Athletic Center (384); Lowell, MA
January 23, 2019; 7:00 p.m., ESPN+		at New Hampshire	W 66–48	13–7 (6–0)	Lundholm Gym (273); Durham, NH
January 26, 2019; 2:00 p.m., ESPN3		Albany	W 82–35	14–7 (7–0)	Chase Arena at Reich Family Pavilion (702); West Hartford, CT
January 30, 2019; 7:00 p.m., ESPN3		at Binghamton	L 62–73	14–8 (7–1)	Binghamton University Events Center (1,101); Vestal, NY
February 2, 2019; 2:00 p.m., ESPN3		Stony Brook	W 73–62	15–8 (8–1)	Chase Arena at Reich Family Pavilion (858); West Hartford, CT
February 6, 2019; 7:00 p.m., ESPN3		UMBC	W 92–47	16–8 (9–1)	Chase Arena at Reich Family Pavilion (554); West Hartford, CT
February 13, 2019; 7:00 p.m., ESPN+		at Maine	L 58–78	16–9 (9–2)	Cross Insurance Center (1,443); Bangor, ME
February 16, 2019; 2:00 p.m., ESPN3		at Vermont	W 76–48	17–9 (10–2)	Patrick Gym (589); Burlington, VT
February 20, 2019; 7:00 p.m., ESPN+		New Hampshire	W 56–49	18–9 (11–2)	Chase Arena at Reich Family Pavilion (522); West Hartford, CT
February 23, 2019; 2:00 p.m., ESPN3		UMass Lowell	W 69–45	19–9 (12–2)	Chase Arena at Reich Family Pavilion (820); West Hartford, CT
February 27, 2019; 7:00 p.m., ESPN+		Binghamton	W 63–50	20–9 (13–2)	Chase Arena at Reich Family Pavilion (589); West Hartford, CT
March 2, 2019; 2:00 p.m., ESPN3		at Albany	W 68–56	21–9 (14–2)	SEFCU Arena (996); Albany, NY
America East women's tournament
March 6, 2019; 7:00 p.m., ESPN+	(2)	(7) UMBC; Quarterfinals	W 65–48	22–9	Chase Arena at Reich Family Pavilion (523); West Hartford, CT
March 10, 2019; 2:00 p.m., ESPN+	(2)	(3) Stony Brook; Semifinals	W 64–59	23–9	Chase Arena at Reich Family Pavilion (742); West Hartford, CT
March 15, 2019; 5:00 p.m., ESPNU	(2)	at (1) Maine; Championship game	L 48–68	23–10	Cross Insurance Center; Bangor, ME
WNIT
March 21, 2019*; 7:00 p.m.		at Providence; First round	L 54–71	23–11	Alumni Hall (368); Providence, RI
*Non-conference game. ^{#}Rankings from AP poll. (#) Tournament seedings in parentheses. All times are in Eastern.

== See also ==
- 2018–19 Hartford Hawks men's basketball team
