= 2018–19 UMBC Retrievers women's basketball team =

Intercollegiate basketball season

2018–19 UMBC Retrievers women's basketball
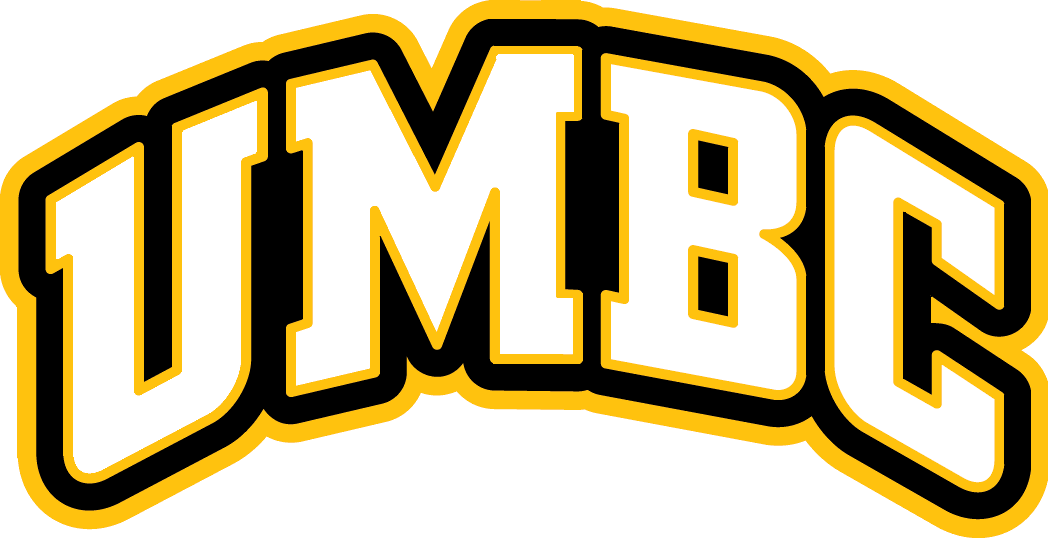
- Conference: America East Conference
- Record: 10–20 (3–13 America East)
- Head coach: Phil Stern (resigned Feb. 22, 2019); Carlee Cassidy-Dewey (interim)
- Assistant coaches: Chelsea Barker Walsh; Courtnay Pilypaitis
- Home arena: UMBC Event Center

2018–19 America East Conference women's basketball standings
	Conf.				Overall
Team	W		L	PCT	W		L	PCT
Maine †	15	–	1	.938	25	–	8	.758
Hartford	14	–	2	.875	23	–	11	.676
Stony Brook	11	–	5	.688	23	–	8	.742
Albany	9	–	7	.563	13	–	18	.419
Binghamton	7	–	9	.438	12	–	18	.400
Vermont	7	–	9	.438	11	–	18	.379
UMBC	3	–	13	.188	10	–	20	.333
UMass Lowell	3	–	13	.188	7	–	22	.241
New Hampshire	3	–	13	.188	6	–	24	.200
† 2019 America East tournament winner

The 2018–19 UMBC Retrievers women's basketball team represented the University of Maryland, Baltimore County (UMBC) during the 2018–19 NCAA Division I women's basketball season. The Retrievers, initially led by 17th-year head coach Phil Stern, played their home games at UMBC Event Center in Catonsville, Maryland and were members of the America East Conference.

The Retrievers finished the season 10–20, 3–13 in America East play, to finish in a three-way tie for seventh place. They lost in the first round of the America East tournament to Hartford.

On February 22, 2019, Stern, who had been on administrative leave since December 13, 2018, announced his resignation from UMBC. Assistant coach Carlee Cassidy-Dewey served as interim head coach during Stern's initial leave, and continued in that role following his resignation.

== Media ==
All non-televised home games and conference road games streamed on either ESPN3 or AmericaEast.tv. Most road games streamed on the opponents' websites. Select games were broadcast on the radio on WQLL-1370 AM.

== Roster ==
2018–19 UMBC Retrievers women's basketball team
Players
Coaches

Pos.	#	Name	Height	Year	Previous school	Hometown
G	0	Tania Hill	6 ft 0 in (1.83 m)	Fr	Capitol Christian Academy	Brandywine, MD
F	1	Janee'a Summers	5 ft 11 in (1.8 m)	So	Bound Brook	Bound Brook, NJ
G	2	O'lesheya Braxton	5 ft 11 in (1.8 m)	RS Fr	Paterson Kennedy	Paterson, NJ
G	3	Te'yJah Oliver	5 ft 8 in (1.73 m)	Jr	Riverdale Baptist	Clinton, MD
F	10	Eryn Fisher	6 ft 0 in (1.83 m)	Fr	Woodvale Secondary College	Kingsley, Australia
G	11	Sariah Penese	5 ft 7 in (1.7 m)	Fr	St. Mary's Girl's Catholic College	Wellington, New Zealand
G	12	Paula Rubio	5 ft 10 in (1.78 m)	Fr	Colegio Sagrada Familia	Madrid, Spain
F	13	Jen Gast	6 ft 2 in (1.88 m)	So	Catonsville	Baltimore, MD
F	22	Kayla Jackson	5 ft 10 in (1.78 m)	Fr	Aquinas Institute of Rochester	Rochester, NY
F	23	Kristen Teklits	5 ft 10 in (1.78 m)	So	New Fairfield	New Fairfield, CT
F/C	24	Lucrezia Costa	6 ft 2 in (1.88 m)	Jr	Liceo Classico Enrico Perito	Rome, Italy
G	30	Silvia Ferreiros	5 ft 7 in (1.7 m)	Fr	Colegio San José	Lugo, Spain
G	35	Dominika Skrocka	5 ft 9 in (1.75 m)	Jr	Southwest Tennessee CC	Moscow, Russia
G	42	Tyler Moore	5 ft 9 in (1.75 m)	Jr	Norfolk Academy	Portsmouth, VA

Head coach

- Phil Stern (Concordia (NY)) (resigned Feb. 22, 2019)
- Carlee Cassidy-Dewey (UMBC) (interim)

Assistant coach(es)

- Chelsea Barker Walsh (UMBC)
- Courtnay Pilypaitis (Vermont)

Legend

- (C) Team captain
- (S) Suspended
- (I) Ineligible
- (W) Walk-on
- Injured
- Current redshirt

Roster
Last update: April 13, 2025

== Schedule ==
Date time, TV	Rank^{#}	Opponent^{#}	Result	Record	Site (attendance) city, state
Non-conference regular season
November 6, 2018*; 7:00 p.m., ESPN+		Gettysburg	W 65–51	1–0	UMBC Event Center (386); Catonsville, MD
November 8, 2018*; 5:00 p.m., ESPN+		Eastern (PA)	W 81–42	2–0	UMBC Event Center (204); Catonsville, MD
November 10, 2018*; 2:00 p.m.		vs. UTSA; Seton Hall Tip-Off	W 72–58	3–0	Walsh Gymnasium (214); South Orange, NJ
November 11, 2018*; 11:00 a.m.		vs. Kennesaw State; Seton Hall Tip-Off	W 57–53	4–0	Walsh Gymnasium (307); South Orange, NJ
November 14, 2018*; 11:00 a.m.		at Coppin State	W 57–52	5–0	Physical Education Complex (933); Baltimore, MD
November 16, 2018*; 7:00 p.m., ESPN+		Notre Dame (MD)	W 81–43	6–0	UMBC Event Center (175); Catonsville, MD
November 20, 2018*; 7:00 p.m., ESPN+		Towson	L 62–71	6–1	UMBC Event Center (197); Catonsville, MD
November 28, 2018*; 7:00 p.m.		at American	L 42–64	6–2	Bender Arena (355); Washington, D.C.
December 2, 2018*; 1:00 p.m.		at No. 7 Maryland	L 61–92	6–3	Xfinity Center (4,226); College Park, MD
December 6, 2018*; 7:00 p.m., ESPN+		Mount St. Mary's	L 52–65	6–4	UMBC Event Center (318); Catonsville, MD
December 9, 2018*; 1:00 p.m., ESPN+		Hofstra	L 42–45	6–5	UMBC Event Center (339); Catonsville, MD
December 20, 2018*; 5:30 p.m.		at Morgan State	W 73–68	7–5	Talmadge L. Hill Field House (54); Baltimore, MD
December 31, 2018*; 3:00 p.m., ESPN+		Maryland Eastern Shore	L 67–73 ^{OT}	7–6	UMBC Event Center (1,328); Catonsville, MD
America East regular season
January 5, 2019; 1:00 p.m., ESPN3		at Maine	L 44–84	7–7 (0–1)	Cross Insurance Center (1,829); Bangor, ME
January 9, 2019; 7:00 p.m., ESPN+		Hartford	L 52–66	7–8 (0–2)	UMBC Event Center (426); Catonsville, MD
January 12, 2019; 1:00 p.m., ESPN3		UMass Lowell	L 55–67	7–9 (0–3)	UMBC Event Center (313); Catonsville, MD
January 16, 2019; 7:00 p.m., ESPN3		at Binghamton	L 45–67	7–10 (0–4)	Binghamton University Events Center (1,389); Vestal, NY
January 19, 2019; 2:00 p.m., ESPN3		at Albany	L 44–64	7–11 (0–5)	SEFCU Arena (840); Albany, NY
January 23, 2019; 11:00 a.m., ESPN3		Vermont	L 44–58	7–12 (0–6)	UMBC Event Center (2,187); Catonsville, MD
January 26, 2019; 12:00 p.m., ESPN3		New Hampshire	W 64–62	8–12 (1–6)	UMBC Event Center (503); Catonsville, MD
January 30, 2019; 7:00 p.m., ESPN+		at Stony Brook	L 44–57	8–13 (1–7)	Island Federal Credit Union Arena (506); Staten Island, NY
February 6, 2019; 7:00 p.m., ESPN3		at Hartford	L 47–92	8–14 (1–8)	Chase Arena at Reich Family Pavilion (554); West Hartford, CT
February 9, 2019; 1:00 p.m., ESPN3		Maine	L 45–58	8–15 (1–9)	UMBC Event Center (728); Catonsville, MD
February 13, 2019; 7:00 p.m., ESPN+		Binghamton	L 46–58	8–16 (1–10)	UMBC Event Center (320); Catonsville, MD
February 16, 2019; 1:00 p.m., ESPN3		at UMass Lowell	L 41–62	8–17 (1–11)	Tsongas Center (854); Lowell, MA
February 20, 2019; 11:00 a.m., ESPN+		at Vermont	L 50–58	8–18 (1–12)	Patrick Gym (1,605); Burlington, VT
February 23, 2019; 1:00 p.m., ESPN3		Albany	W 69–60	9–18 (2–12)	UMBC Event Center (437); Catonsville, MD
February 27, 2019; 7:00 p.m., ESPN+		Stony Brook	L 59–70	9–19 (2–13)	UMBC Event Center (604); Catonsville, MD
March 2, 2019; 12:00 p.m., ESPN3		at New Hampshire	W 55–47	10–19 (3–13)	Lundholm Gym (290); Durham, NH
America East women's tournament
March 6, 2019; 7:00 p.m., ESPN+	(7)	at (2) Hartford; Quarterfinals	L 48–65	10–20	Chase Arena at Reich Family Pavilion (523); West Hartford, CT
*Non-conference game. ^{#}Rankings from AP poll. (#) Tournament seedings in parentheses. All times are in Eastern.

== See also ==
- 2018–19 UMBC Retrievers men's basketball team
