= 2018–19 UMass Lowell River Hawks women's basketball team =

Intercollegiate basketball season

2018–19 UMass Lowell River Hawks women's basketball
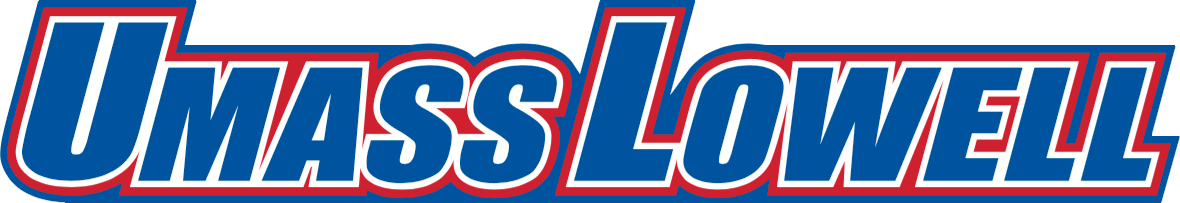
- Conference: America East Conference
- Record: 7–22 (3–13 America East)
- Head coach: Tom Garrick (1st season)
- Assistant coaches: Denise King; Stefanie Murphy; Taryn Johnson
- Home arena: Costello Athletic Center; Tsongas Center

2018–19 America East Conference women's basketball standings
	Conf.				Overall
Team	W		L	PCT	W		L	PCT
Maine †	15	–	1	.938	25	–	8	.758
Hartford	14	–	2	.875	23	–	11	.676
Stony Brook	11	–	5	.688	23	–	8	.742
Albany	9	–	7	.563	13	–	18	.419
Binghamton	7	–	9	.438	12	–	18	.400
Vermont	7	–	9	.438	11	–	18	.379
UMBC	3	–	13	.188	10	–	20	.333
UMass Lowell	3	–	13	.188	7	–	22	.241
New Hampshire	3	–	13	.188	6	–	24	.200
† 2019 America East tournament winner

The 2018–19 UMass Lowell River Hawks women's basketball team represented the University of Massachusetts (UMass) Lowell during the 2018–19 NCAA Division I women's basketball season. The River Hawks were led by first-year head coach Tom Garrick and played most of their home games at the Costello Athletic Center while select games were played at the Tsongas Center at UMass Lowell. They were members of the America East Conference. They finished the season 7–22, 3–13 in America East play, to finish in a tie for last place. Due to a tie-breaker loss to New Hampshire and UMBC they failed to qualify for the America East women's tournament.

== Media ==
All non-televised home games and conference road games streamed on either ESPN3 or AmericaEast.tv. Most road games streamed on the opponent's website.

== Roster ==
2018–19 UMass Lowell River Hawks women's basketball team
Players
Coaches

Pos.	#	Name	Height	Year	Previous school	Hometown
F	0	Kierra Jackson	5 ft 11 in (1.8 m)	RS Fr	St. Frances Academy	Pikesville, MD
G	1	Felicia Korte	5 ft 11 in (1.8 m)	RS So	Watertown	Watertown, MA
G	3	Megan Hendrick	5 ft 9 in (1.75 m)	Jr	Thomas Edison	Alexandria, VA
G	4	Brianna Rudolph	5 ft 9 in (1.75 m)	RS Sr	St. Mary's	Lynn, MA
G	5	Linda Svenne	5 ft 9 in (1.75 m)	So	Riga State Gymnasium No. 3	Riga, Latvia
G	10	Ren'Cia Rolling	5 ft 2 in (1.57 m)	Jr	Seton Academy	Lansing, IL
G	12	Saoirse Power-Cassidy	5 ft 6 in (1.68 m)	So	Marianapolis Prep	Dublin, Ireland
G	14	Felicia Korte	5 ft 11 in (1.8 m)	Jr	Watertown	Watertown, MA
F	21	Oda Shackelford	6 ft 2 in (1.88 m)	Sr	Southwestern	Edinburgh, IN
G	22	Kharis Idom	5 ft 8 in (1.73 m)	Fr	Colonial	Orlando, FL
G	23	Shawnkia McCallum	5 ft 9 in (1.75 m)	So	St. Frances Academy	Perry Hall, MD
F	33	Angel Agoth	6 ft 4 in (1.93 m)	Sr	Rochester John Marshall; Des Moines Area CC	Rochester, MN
G	34	Katie McKie	5 ft 11 in (1.8 m)	So	Vista Ridge	Austin, TX
F	50	Kathrine Smith	6 ft 2 in (1.88 m)	Sr	Canterbury	Fort Wayne, IN

Head coach

- Tom Garrick (Rhode Island)

Assistant coach(es)

- Denise King (Rhode Island)
- Stefanie Murphy (Boston College)
- Taryn Johnson (Fairfield)

Legend

- (C) Team captain
- (S) Suspended
- (I) Ineligible
- (W) Walk-on
- Injured
- Current redshirt

Roster
Last update: July 16, 2024

== Schedule ==
Date time, TV	Rank^{#}	Opponent^{#}	Result	Record	Site (attendance) city, state
Non-conference regular season
November 6, 2018*; 7:00 p.m., ESPN+		Bryant	L 57–58	0–1	Tsongas Center (786); Lowell, MA
November 9, 2018*; 7:00 p.m., ESPN+		Saint Peter's	W 59–57	1–1	Costello Athletic Center (384); Lowell, MA
November 13, 2018*; 7:00 p.m.		Fisher College	W 79–45	2–1	Costello Athletic Center (158); Lowell, MA
November 17, 2018*; 12:00 p.m., ESPN+		at Cornell	L 54–63	2–2	Newman Arena (211); Ithaca, NY
November 20, 2018*; 12:00 p.m.		at Butler	L 36–89	2–3	Hinkle Fieldhouse (461); Indianapolis, IN
November 27, 2018*; 7:00 p.m.		at Seton Hall	L 57–90	2–4	Walsh Gymnasium (651); South Orange, NJ
November 29, 2018*; 7:00 p.m.		at LIU Brooklyn	W 69–64	3–4	Steinberg Wellness Center (264); Brooklyn, NY
December 2, 2018*; 1:00 p.m.		at Holy Cross	L 54–63	3–5	Hart Center (713); Worcester, MA
December 5, 2018*; 7:00 p.m., ESPN+		Colgate	L 52–61	3–6	Costello Athletic Center (822); Lowell, MA
December 8, 2018*; 1:00 p.m., ESPN+		Providence	L 47–71	3–7	Costello Athletic Center (322); Lowell, MA
December 12, 2018*; 7:00 p.m., NESN/ESPN+		at Dartmouth	L 57–70	3–8	Leede Arena (285); Hanover, NH
December 21, 2018*; 1:00 p.m., ESPN+		at Massachusetts	W 62–59	4–8	Mullins Center (422); Amherst, MA
December 29, 2018*; 2:00 p.m.		at Morgan State	L 49–61	4–9	Talmadge L. Hill Field House (78); Baltimore, MD
America East regular season
January 2, 2019; 7:00 p.m., ESPN3		Vermont	W 54–51	5–9 (1–0)	Costello Athletic Center (262); Lowell, MA
January 5, 2019; 7:00 p.m., ESPN3		at Stony Brook	L 56–76	5–10 (1–1)	Island Federal Credit Union Arena (791); Stony Brook, NY
January 9, 2019; 7:00 p.m., ESPN+		New Hampshire	L 53–56	5–11 (1–2)	Tsongas Center (401); Lowell, MA
January 12, 2019; 1:00 p.m., ESPN3		at UMBC	W 67–55	6–11 (2–2)	UMBC Event Center (313); Catonsville, MD
January 16, 2019; 7:00 p.m., ESPN3		at Albany	L 56–63 ^{OT}	6–12 (2–3)	SEFCU Arena (313); Albany, NY
January 19, 2019; 1:00 p.m., ESPN3		Hartford	L 44–66	6–13 (2–4)	Costello Athletic Center (384); Lowell, MA
January 23, 2019; 11:00 a.m., NESN/ESPN3		Binghamton	L 50–70	6–14 (2–5)	Tosongas Center (3,819); Lowell, MA
January 30, 2019; 7:00 p.m., ESPN+		at Maine	L 45–79	6–15 (2–6)	Cross Insurance Center (1,118); Bangor, ME
February 2, 2019; 2:00 p.m., ESPN3		at Vermont	L 42–52	6–16 (2–7)	Patrick Gym (718); Burlington, VT
February 6, 2019; 7:00 p.m., ESPN+		at New Hampshire	L 46–54	6–17 (2–8)	Lundholm Gym (186); Durham, NH
February 9, 2019; 1:00 p.m., ESPN+		Stony Brook	L 47–64	6–18 (2–9)	Costello Athletic Center (356); Lowell, MA
February 13, 2019; 7:00 p.m., ESPN+		Albany	L 53–56	6–19 (2–10)	Tsongas Center (962); Lowell, MA
February 16, 2019; 1:00 p.m., ESPN3		UMBC	W 62–41	7–19 (3–10)	Tsongas Center (854); Lowell, MA
February 20, 2019; 7:00 p.m., ESPN+		at Binghamton	L 53–58	7–20 (3–11)	Binghamton University Events Center (1,269); Vestal, NY
February 23, 2019; 2:00 p.m., ESPN3		at Hartford	L 45–69	7–21 (3–12)	Chase Arena at Reich Family Pavilion (820); West Hartford, CT
February 27, 2019; 1:00 p.m., ESPN+		Maine	L 41–60	7–22 (3–13)	Tosongas Center (514); Lowell, MA
*Non-conference game. ^{#}Rankings from AP poll. (#) Tournament seedings in parentheses. All times are in Eastern.

== See also ==
- 2018–19 UMass Lowell River Hawks men's basketball team
