= 2019–20 Hartford Hawks women's basketball team =

Intercollegiate basketball season

2019–20 Hartford Hawks women's basketball
- Conference: America East Conference
- Record: 1–28 (1–15 America East)
- Head coach: Morgan Valley (1st season)
- Assistant coaches: Melissa L. Hodgdon; Courtney Davidson; Hailee Barron
- Home arena: Chase Arena at Reich Family Pavilion

2019–20 America East Conference women's basketball standings
	Conf.				Overall
Team	W		L	PCT	W		L	PCT
Stony Brook	14	–	2	.875	28	–	3	.903
Maine	12	–	4	.750	16	–	14	.533
UMass Lowell	11	–	5	.688	15	–	14	.517
Binghamton	10	–	6	.625	21	–	8	.724
New Hampshire	7	–	9	.438	10	–	18	.357
Vermont	6	–	10	.375	12	–	17	.414
UMBC	6	–	10	.375	10	–	17	.370
Albany	5	–	11	.313	9	–	20	.310
Hartford	1	–	15	.063	1	–	28	.034
† 2020 America East tournament winner Rankings from AP poll

The 2019–20 Hartford Hawks women's basketball team represented the University of Hartford during the 2019–20 NCAA Division I women's basketball season. The Hawks, led by first-year head coach Morgan Valley, played their home games in the Chase Arena at Reich Family Pavilion in West Hartford, Connecticut and were members of the America East Conference. They finished the season 1–28, 1–15 in American East play, to finish in ninth (last) place.

== Roster ==
2019–20 Hartford Hawks women's basketball team
Players
Coaches

Pos.	#	Name	Height	Year	Previous school	Hometown
G	1	Jordan McLemore	5 ft 8 in (1.73 m)	So	Lodi	Palisades Park, NJ
G	3	Jada Lucas	5 ft 5 in (1.65 m)	Jr	New London	New London, CT
G	5	Nina Farkic	5 ft 9 in (1.75 m)	Jr	Cameron Heights; Western Michigan	Kitchener, ON
G	11	Liz Garcia	5 ft 10 in (1.78 m)	Jr	Academy of the Holy Angels	Teaneck, NJ
G	13	Carmen Villalobos	6 ft 1 in (1.85 m)	Fr	Segle XXI	Cádiz, Spain
G	15	Irene Primo	5 ft 4 in (1.63 m)	Fr	Club Baloncesto Tres Cantos	Tres Cantos, Spain
F	21	Charlette Leurs	6 ft 2 in (1.88 m)	So	Bronx River – Lehman Campus	The Bronx, NY
G	30	Kaela Dothard	5 ft 8 in (1.73 m)	Fr	Mary's Ryken	Lexington Park, MD
G	31	Abby Streeter	5 ft 11 in (1.8 m)	Jr	Lawrence Academy; Rhode Island	Nashua, NH
G	32	Jabria Ingram	5 ft 8 in (1.73 m)	So	Neumann-Goretti	Upper Darby, PA
F	33	Azariah Wade	6 ft 0 in (1.83 m)	RS Fr	Bishop Grimes	Syracuse, NY
F	40	Sierra Smith	6 ft 0 in (1.83 m)	So	St. Anne's-Belfield School	Madison, VA
F/C	44	Brielle Wilborn	6 ft 3 in (1.91 m)	Jr	Middletown	Middletown, CT

Head coach

- Morgan Valley (Connecticut)

Assistant coach(es)

- Melissa L. Hodgdon (Springfield)
- Courtney Davidson (Michigan State)
- Hailee Barron (James Madison)

Legend

- (C) Team captain
- (S) Suspended
- (I) Ineligible
- (W) Walk-on
- Injured
- Current redshirt

Roster
Last update: March 3, 2025

== Schedule ==
Date time, TV	Rank^{#}	Opponent^{#}	Result	Record	Site (attendance) city, state
Non-conference regular season
November 6, 2019*; 7:00 p.m., ESPN3		Hofstra	L 41–43	0–1	Chase Arena at Reich Family Pavilion; West Hartford, CT
November 10, 2019*; 2:00 p.m., ESPN+		Rhode Island	L 56–68	0–2	Chase Arena at Reich Family Pavilion; West Hartford, CT
November 13, 2019*; 7:00 p.m., ESPN+		Providence	L 57–75	0–3	Chase Arena at Reich Family Pavilion; West Hartford, CT
November 17, 2019*; 2:00 p.m., ESPN+		at UMass	L 48–74	0–4	William D. Mullins Memorial Center; Amherst, MA
November 22, 2019*; 6:00 p.m., ESPN+		at Harvard	L 44–53	0–5	Lavietes Pavilion; Boston, MA
November 24, 2019*; 2:00 p.m., BTN Plus		at Michigan State	L 34–79	0–6	Breslin Center (5,033); East Lansing, MI
November 26, 2019*; 5:00 p.m.		at William & Mary	L 44–61	0–7	Kaplan Arena; Williamsburg, VA
December 2, 2019*; 7:00 p.m.		at Penn	L 46–74	0–8	Palestra; Philadelphia, PA
December 7, 2019*; 2:00 p.m., ESPN+		NJIT	L 52–61	0–9	Chase Arena at Reich Family Pavilion; West Hartford, CT
December 10, 2019*; 5:00 p.m., ESPN+		at Princeton	L 42–73	0–10	Jadwin Gymnasium; Princeton, NJ
December 14, 2019*; 1:00 p.m.		at Northeastern	L 47–60	0–11	Matthews Arena; Boston, MA
December 21, 2019*; 2:00 p.m., ESPN+		Central Connecticut; Rivalry	L 54–61	0–12	Chase Arena at Reich Family Pavilion; West Hartford, CT
December 29, 2019*; 2:00 p.m., ESPN+		Quinnipiac	L 50–87	0–13	Chase Arena at Reich Family Pavilion; West Hartford, CT
America East regular season
January 2, 2020; 7:00 p.m., ESPN+		at Maine	L 73–87	0–14 (0–1)	Cross Insurance Center; Bangor, ME
January 5, 2020; 1:00 p.m., ESPN+		at New Hampshire	L 71–72	0–15 (0–2)	Lundholm Gym; Durham, NH
January 8, 2020; 7:00 p.m., ESPN+		UMass Lowell	L 63–68	0–16 (0–3)	Chase Arena at Reich Family Pavilion; West Hartford, CT
January 15, 2020; 6:31 p.m., ESPN+		at Stony Brook	L 55–66	0–17 (0–4)	Island Federal Credit Union Arena; Stony Brook, NY
January 18, 2020; 2:00 p.m., ESPN+		Vermont	L 53–63	0–18 (0–5)	Chase Arena at Reich Family Pavilion; West Hartford, CT
January 22, 2020; 11:00 a.m., ESPN+		at UMBC	L 54–61	0–19 (0–6)	UMBC Event Center; Catonsville, MD
January 25, 2020; 2:00 p.m., ESPN+		Albany	L 63–68	0–20 (0–7)	Chase Arena at Reich Family Pavilion; West Hartford, CT
January 29, 2020; 7:00 p.m., ESPN+		at Binghamton	L 44–80	0–21 (0–8)	Binghamton University Events Center; Vestal, NY
February 1, 2020; 2:00 p.m.		Maine	L 52–69	0–22 (0–9)	Chase Arena at Reich Family Pavilion; West Hartford, CT
February 5, 2020; 7:00 p.m., ESPN+		UMBC	L 47–56	0–23 (0–10)	Chase Arena at Reich Family Pavilion; West Hartford, CT
February 8, 2020; 2:00 p.m., ESPN3		at Vermont	L 51–62	0–24 (0–11)	Patrick Gym; Burlington, VT
February 12, 2020; 7:00 p.m., ESPN+		at Albany	L 40–63	0–25 (0–12)	SEFCU Arena; Albany, NY
February 15, 2020; 1:00 p.m., ESPN+		at UMass Lowell	L 56–64	0–26 (0–13)	Tsongas Center; Lowell, MA
February 19, 2020; 7:00 p.m., ESPN+		New Hampshire	L 55–64	0–27 (0–14)	Chase Arena at Reich Family Pavilion; West Hartford, CT
February 22, 2020; 2:00 p.m., ESPN+		Binghamton	L 65–78	0–28 (0–15)	Chase Arena at Reich Family Pavilion; West Hartford, CT
February 26, 2020; 7:00 p.m., ESPN+		Stony Brook	W 70–67	1–28 (1–16)	Chase Arena at Reich Family Pavilion; West Hartford, CT
*Non-conference game. ^{#}Rankings from AP poll. (#) Tournament seedings in parentheses. All times are in Eastern.
