= 2018–19 Maine Black Bears women's basketball team =

Intercollegiate basketball season

2018–19 Maine Black Bears women's basketball

American East regular-season and tournament champions

NCAA tournament, first round
- Conference: America East Conference
- Record: 25–8 (15–1 America East)
- Head coach: Amy Vachon (2nd season)
- Assistant coaches: Courtney England; Tom Biskup; Gary Fifield
- Home arena: Cross Insurance Center

2018–19 America East Conference women's basketball standings
	Conf.				Overall
Team	W		L	PCT	W		L	PCT
Maine †	15	–	1	.938	25	–	8	.758
Hartford	14	–	2	.875	23	–	11	.676
Stony Brook	11	–	5	.688	23	–	8	.742
Albany	9	–	7	.563	13	–	18	.419
Binghamton	7	–	9	.438	12	–	18	.400
Vermont	7	–	9	.438	11	–	18	.379
UMBC	3	–	13	.188	10	–	20	.333
UMass Lowell	3	–	13	.188	7	–	22	.241
New Hampshire	3	–	13	.188	6	–	24	.200
† 2019 America East tournament winner

The 2018–19 Maine Black Bears women's basketball team represented the University of Maine in the 2018–19 NCAA Division I women's basketball season. The Black Bears, led by second-year head coach Amy Vachon, played their home games at the Cross Insurance Center in Bangor, Maine and were members of the America East Conference. The Black Bears won the championship game of the 2019 America East women's basketball tournament over Hartford to earn the automatic bid to the NCAA Division I women's basketball tournament. They lost in the first round to NC State.

== Media ==
All home games and conference road games streamed on either ESPN3 or AmericaEast.tv. Most road games streamed on the opponent's website. All games were broadcast on the radio on WGUY and online on the Maine Portal.

== Roster ==
2018–19 Maine Black Bears women's basketball team
Players
Coaches

Pos.	#	Name	Height	Year	Previous school	Hometown
G	2	Sierra Tapley	5 ft 8 in (1.73 m)	Jr	Mount Desert Island	Bar Harbor, ME
G	4	Maddy McVicar	5 ft 4 in (1.63 m)	Sr	Calais	Calais, ME
F	5	Maeve Carroll	5 ft 11 in (1.8 m)	So	Georgetown Visitation Preparatory	Oakton, VA
G	10	Doga Alper	5 ft 11 in (1.8 m)	Fr	Florya Doga Anatolian	Istanbul, Turkey
G	12	Parise Rossignol	5 ft 8 in (1.73 m)	Sr	Van Buren	Van Buren, ME
G	15	Dor Saar	5 ft 6 in (1.68 m)	So	Israeli Basketball Academy	Ma'anit, Israel
G	20	Kelly Fogarty	5 ft 9 in (1.75 m)	So	Walpole	Walpole, MA
G	22	Blanca Millán	5 ft 11 in (1.8 m)	Jr	Colegio Manuel Peleteiro	Santiago de Compostela, Spain
G	23	Tanesha Sutton	5 ft 10 in (1.78 m)	RS Sr	Ss. Neumann and Goretti; Duquesne	Philadelphia, PA
C	31	Kat Williams	6 ft 5 in (1.96 m)	So	Marjory Stoneman Douglas	Coral Springs, FL
F	32	Kira Barra	6 ft 3 in (1.91 m)	So	Theo Koch Schule	Dillingen, Germany
F	33	Alex Bolozova	6 ft 2 in (1.88 m)	Jr	Gymnazium Dominika Tatarku	Poprad, Slovakia
F	51	Fanny Wadling	6 ft 1 in (1.85 m)	Jr	Luleå Praktiska Gymnasium	Nacka, Sweden

Head coach

- Amy Vachon (Maine)

Assistant coach(es)

- Courtney England (Maine)
- Tom Biskup (Maine)
- Gary Fifield (Vermont)

Legend

- (C) Team captain
- (S) Suspended
- (I) Ineligible
- (W) Walk-on
- Injured
- Current redshirt

Roster
Last update: March 20, 2025

== Schedule and results ==
Date time, TV	Rank^{#}	Opponent^{#}	Result	Record	Site (attendance) city, state
Exhibition
November 3, 2018*; 1:00 p.m.		Stonehill	W 85–46		Cross Insurance Center (1,430); Bangor, ME
Non-conference regular season
November 10, 2018*; 1:00 p.m., ESPN+		Toledo	W 73–59	1–0	Cross Insurance Center (1,578); Bangor, ME
November 13, 2018*; 1:00 p.m.		at Bryant	W 74–57	2–0	Chace Athletic Center (453); Smithfield, RI
November 15, 2018*; 7:00 p.m., ESPN+		No. 20 Duke	L 63–66	2–1	Cross Insurance Center (2,868); Bangor, ME
November 20, 2018*; 8:00 p.m., ESPN+		at Green Bay	L 39–70	2–2	Kress Events Center (1,280); Green Bay, WI
November 24, 2018*; 3:15 p.m.		vs. North Carolina A&T; Navy Classic semifinals	W 58–52	3–2	Alumni Hall (414); Annapolis, MD
November 25, 2018*; 3:15 p.m.		vs. Penn; Navy Classic championship game	W 47–46	4–2	Alumni Hall (368); Annapolis, MD
December 2, 2018*; 2:00 p.m., ACCNE		at North Carolina	W 85–73	5–2	Carmichael Arena (2,159); Chapel Hill, NC
December 4, 2018*; 7:00 p.m., ESPN+		at Harvard	W 67–60	6–2	Lavietes Pavilion (426); Cambridge, MA
December 8, 2018*; 1:00 p.m., ESPN+		Brown	W 102–96 ^{OT}	7–2	Cross Insurance Center (2,128); Bangor, ME
December 15, 2018*; 6:00 p.m., ACCNE		at No. 10 NC State	L 46–84	7–3	Reynolds Coliseum (2,755); Raleigh, NC
December 22, 2018*; 12:00 p.m.		at Northeastern	L 55–63	7–4	Cabot Center (337); Boston, MA
December 29, 2018*; 1:00 p.m.		at Fordham; Fordham Holiday Classic semifinals	L 64–72 ^{OT}	7–5	Rose Hill Gymnasium; The Bronx, NY
December 30, 2018*; 1:00 p.m.		vs. Chattanooga; Fordham Holiday Classic 3rd-place game	L 61–66	7–6	Rose Hill Gymnasium; Bronx, NY
America East regular season
January 2, 2019; 7:00 p.m., ESPN+		New Hampshire	W 67–46	8–6 (1–0)	Cross Insurance Center (1,541); Bangor, ME
January 5, 2019; 1:00 p.m., ESPN3		UMBC	W 84–44	9–6 (2–0)	Cross Insurance Center (1,829); Bangor, ME
January 9, 2019; 7:00 p.m., ESPN3		at Vermont	W 63–51	10–6 (3–0)	Patrick Gym (329); Burlington, VT
January 12, 2019; 1:00 p.m., ESPN3		Albany	W 76–65	11–6 (4–0)	Cross Insurance Center (1,733); Bangor, ME
January 16, 2019; 7:00 p.m., ESPN3		at Hartford	L 46–49	11–7 (4–1)	Chase Arena at Reich Family Pavilion (566); West Hartford, CT
January 19, 2019; 7:00 p.m., ESPN3		at Stony Brook	W 68–54	12–7 (5–1)	Island Federal Credit Union Arena (683); Stony Brook, NY
January 27, 2019; 12:00 p.m., ESPN+		Binghamton	W 95–66	13–7 (6–1)	Cross Insurance Center (2,180); Bangor, ME
January 30, 2019; 7:00 p.m., ESPN+		UMass Lowell	W 79–45	14–7 (7–1)	Cross Insurance Center (1,118); Bangor, ME
February 2, 2019; 1:00 p.m., ESPN3		at New Hampshire	W 69–45	15–7 (8–1)	Lundholm Gym (813); Durham, NH
February 6, 2019; 7:00 p.m., ESPN+		Vermont	W 66–45	16–7 (9–1)	Cross Insurance Center (1,279); Bangor, ME
February 9, 2019; 1:00 p.m., ESPN3		at UMBC	W 58–45	17–7 (10–1)	UMBC Event Center (728); Catonsville, MD
February 13, 2019; 7:00 p.m., ESPN+		Hartford	W 78–58	18–7 (11–1)	Cross Insurance Center (1,443); Bangor, ME
February 16, 2019; 2:00 p.m., ESPN3		at Albany	W 67–61	19–7 (12–1)	SEFCU Arena (1,014); Albany, NY
February 24, 2019; 1:00 p.m., ESPN+		Stony Brook	W 71–61	20–7 (13–1)	Augusta Civic Center (1,008); Augusta, ME
February 27, 2019; 7:00 p.m., ESPN+		at UMass Lowell	W 60–41	21–7 (14–1)	Tsongas Center (514); Lowell, MA
March 2, 2019; 12:00 p.m., ESPN3		at Binghamton	W 67–60	22–7 (15–1)	Binghamton University Events Center (1,501); Vestal, NY
America East women's tournament
March 6, 2019; 7:00 p.m., ESPN+	(1)	(8) New Hampshire; Quarterfinals	W 69–36	23–7	Cross Insurance Center (1,764); Bangor, ME
March 10, 2019; 1:00 p.m., ESPN+	(1)	(4) Albany; Semifinals	W 66–51	24–7	Memorial Gym (1,233); Orono, ME
March 15, 2019; 5:00 p.m., ESPNU	(1)	(2) Hartford; Championship game	W 68–48	25–7	Cross Insurance Center (3,234); Bangor, ME
NCAA women's tournament
March 23, 2019*; 1:30 p.m., ESPN2	(14 G)	at (3 G) No. 10 NC State; First round	L 51–63	25–8	Reynolds Coliseum (2,769); Raleigh, NC
*Non-conference game. ^{#}Rankings from AP poll. (#) Tournament seedings in parentheses. G=Greensboro Region. All times are in Eastern.

== See also ==
- 2018–19 Maine Black Bears men's basketball team
