= 2018–19 Albany Great Danes women's basketball team =

Intercollegiate basketball season

2018–19 Albany Great Danes women's basketball
- Conference: America East Conference
- Record: 13–18 (9–7 America East)
- Head coach: Colleen Mullen (1st season)
- Assistant coaches: Yvonne Hawkins; Catherine Cassidy; Megan Methven
- Home arena: SEFCU Arena

2018–19 America East Conference women's basketball standings
	Conf.				Overall
Team	W		L	PCT	W		L	PCT
Maine †	15	–	1	.938	25	–	8	.758
Hartford	14	–	2	.875	23	–	11	.676
Stony Brook	11	–	5	.688	23	–	8	.742
Albany	9	–	7	.563	13	–	18	.419
Binghamton	7	–	9	.438	12	–	18	.400
Vermont	7	–	9	.438	11	–	18	.379
UMBC	3	–	13	.188	10	–	20	.333
UMass Lowell	3	–	13	.188	7	–	22	.241
New Hampshire	3	–	13	.188	6	–	24	.200
† 2019 America East tournament winner

The 2018–19 Albany Great Danes women's basketball team represented the University at Albany, SUNY during the 2018–19 NCAA Division I women's basketball season. The Great Danes, led by first-year head coach Colleen Mullen, played their home games at SEFCU Arena and were members of the America East Conference. They finished the season 13–18, 9–7 in America East play to finish in fourth place. They defeated Binghamton in the quarterfinals before losing to Maine in the semifinals of the America East women's tournament.

Bernabei-McNamee left Albany on April 10 after two seasons for Boston College. On May 14, former Army assistant head coach Colleen Mullen was named the new head coach for the Great Danes.

== Media ==
All home games and conference road games were streamed on either ESPN3 on AmericaEast.tv. Most road games were streamed on the opponent's website. Selected games were broadcast on the radio on WCDB.

== Roster ==
2018–19 Albany Great Danes women's basketball team
Players
Coaches

Pos.	#	Name	Height	Year	Previous school	Hometown
G/F	1	Julie Ford	6 ft 1 in (1.85 m)	Fr	Cooperstown Central School	Hartwick, NY
G	2	Kyara Frames	5 ft 2 in (1.57 m)	So	Bishop McNamara	Laurel, MD
G	3	Khepera Stokes	5 ft 6 in (1.68 m)	RS Jr	Baltimore Polytechnic Institute	Baltimore, MD
G	4	De'jah Williams	5 ft 11 in (1.8 m)	So	Imhotep Charter School	Philadelphia, PA
G	10	Patricia Conroy	5 ft 9 in (1.75 m)	So	St. Joseph Hill Academy	Staten Island, NY
G/F	13	Lucia Decortes	6 ft 3 in (1.91 m)	Fr	Liceo delle Scienze Umane e Musicale	Bergamo
F	14	Amanda Kantzy (redshirt)	6 ft 3 in (1.91 m)	Sr	Luleå Basketgymnasium; Colorado State	Spånga, Sweden
G	20	Kumsal Aslan	5 ft 8 in (1.73 m)	Jr	St. Timothy's School	Ankara, Turkey
F	22	Heather Forster	6 ft 2 in (1.88 m)	Sr	Huntington	Huntington, NY
C	24	Alexi Schecter	6 ft 3 in (1.91 m)	Jr	Lowell	Lowell, MA
F	44	Chyanna Canada	6 ft 2 in (1.88 m)	Sr	Nottingham	Syracuse, NY

Head coach

- Colleen Mullen (New Hampshire)

Assistant coach(es)

- Yvonne Hawkins (Ashland)
- Catherine Cassidy (Plattsburgh State)
- Megan Methven (Stonehill)

Legend

- (C) Team captain
- (S) Suspended
- (I) Ineligible
- (W) Walk-on
- Injured
- Current redshirt

Roster

== Schedule ==
Date time, TV	Rank^{#}	Opponent^{#}	Result	Record	Site (attendance) city, state
Non-conference regular season
11/09/2018*; 7:00 pm		at No. 22 South Florida	L 37–74	0–1	Yuengling Center (2,269); Tampa, FL
11/12/2018*; 7:00 pm, ESPN+		at Cornell	L 34–48	0–2	Newman Arena (269); Ithaca, NY
11/14/2018*; 5:00 pm, ESPN+		Manhattan	W 60–54	1–2	SEFCU Arena; Albany, NY
11/18/2018*; 4:00 pm		at Rutgers	L 39–65	1–3	Louis Brown Athletic Center (1,625); Piscataway, NJ
11/21/2018*; 7:00 pm, ESPN+		at Monmouth	L 56–64	1–4	OceanFirst Bank Center (140); West Long Branch, NJ
11/25/2018*; 2:00 pm, ESPN+		Holy Cross	L 50–56	1–5	SEFCU Arena (978); Albany, NY
11/28/2018*; 7:00 pm, ESPN+		Canisius	L 42–48	1–6	SEFCU Arena (747); Albany, NY
12/01/2018*; 2:00 pm		at Lafayette	L 66–67 ^{2OT}	1–7	Kirby Sports Center (404); Easton, PA
12/05/2018*; 7:00 pm		Central Connecticut	L 53–60	1–8	SEFCU Arena (901); Albany, NY
12/08/2018*; 2:00 pm		Marist	L 56–74	1–9	SEFCU Arena (996); Albany, NY
12/15/2018*; 1:00 pm		at St. Francis Brooklyn	W 67–60	2–9	Generoso Pope Athletic Complex (448); Brooklyn, NY
12/19/2018*; 11:30 am		at Purdue	L 41–53	2–10	Mackey Arena (7,038); West Lafayette, IN
12/29/2018*; 2:00 pm, ESPN+		at Columbia	W 62–58	3–10	Levien Gymnasium (552); New York, NY
America East regular season
01/02/2019; 7:00 pm, ESPN3		Binghamton	W 61–56	4–10 (1–0)	SEFCU Arena (854); Albany, NY
01/05/2019; 2:00 pm, ESPN3		at Vermont	L 39–52	4–11 (1–1)	Patrick Gym (588); Burlington, VT
01/12/2019; 1:00 pm, ESPN3		at Maine	L 65–76	4–12 (1–2)	Cross Insurance Center (1,733); Bangor, ME
01/16/2019; 7:00 pm, ESPN3		UMass Lowell	W 63–56 ^{OT}	5–12 (2–2)	SEFCU Arena (785); Albany, NY
01/19/2019; 2:00 pm, ESPN3		UMBC	W 64–44	6–12 (3–2)	SEFCU Arena (840); Albany, NY
01/23/2019; 7:00 pm, ESPN+		at Stony Brook	W 68–54	7–12 (4–2)	Island Federal Credit Union Arena (651); Stony Brook, NY
01/26/2019; 2:00 pm, ESPN3		at Hartford	L 35–82	7–13 (4–3)	Chase Arena at Reich Family Pavilion (702); West Hartford, CT
01/30/2019; 11:00 am, ESPN+		New Hampshire	W 59–41	8–13 (5–3)	SEFCU Arena (1,911); Albany, NY
02/02/2019; 2:00 pm, ESPN3		at Binghamton	W 71–62	9–13 (6–3)	Binghamton University Events Center (1,799); Vestal, NY
02/09/2019; 2:00 pm, ESPN+		Vermont	W 65–40	10–13 (7–3)	SEFCU Arena (936); Albany, NY
02/13/2019; 7:00 pm, ESPN+		at UMass Lowell	W 56–53	11–13 (8–3)	Tsongas Center (962); Lowell, MA
02/16/2019; 2:00 pm, ESPN3		Maine	L 61–67	11–14 (8–4)	SEFCU Arena (1,017); Albany, NY
02/20/2019; 7:00 pm, ESPN+		Stony Brook	L 52–68	11–15 (8–5)	SEFCU Arena (884); Albany, NY
02/23/2019; 1:00 pm, ESPN3		at UMBC	L 60–69	11–16 (8–6)	UMBC Event Center (437); Catonsville, MD
02/27/2019; 12:00 pm, ESPN+		at New Hampshire	W 78–53	12–16 (9–6)	Lundholm Gym (369); Durham, NH
03/02/2019; 2:00 pm, ESPN3		Hartford	L 56–68	12–17 (9–7)	SEFCU Arena (996); Albany, NY
America East Women's Tournament
03/06/2019; 7:00 pm, ESPN+	(4)	(5) Binghamton; Quarterfinals	W 61–56	13–17	SEFCU Arena (472); Albany, NY
03/10/2019; 1:00 pm, ESPN+	(4)	at (1) Maine; Semifinals	L 51–66	13–18	Memorial Gym (1,233); Orono, ME
*Non-conference game. ^{#}Rankings from AP Poll. (#) Tournament seedings in parentheses. All times are in Eastern Time.

== Rankings ==
+ Regular season polls	Poll	Pre- season	Week 2	Week 3	Week 4	Week 5	Week 6	Week 7	Week 8	Week 9	Week 10	Week 11	Week 12	Week 13	Week 14	Week 15	Week 16	Week 17	Week 18	Week 19	Final
AP																				N/A	
Coaches																					

Legend
	Increase in ranking
	Decrease in ranking
	No change
(RV)	Received votes
(NR)	Not ranked

== See also ==
- 2018–19 Albany Great Danes men's basketball team
