= Tom Garrick =

American basketball player and coach (born 1966)

Vanderbilt Commodores
- Title: Assistant coach
- League: Southeastern Conference

Personal information
- Born: July 7, 1966 (age 60) West Warwick, Rhode Island, U.S.
- Listed height: 6 ft 2 in (1.88 m)
- Listed weight: 185 lb (84 kg)

Career information
- High school: West Warwick (West Warwick, Rhode Island)
- College: Rhode Island (1984–1988)
- NBA draft: 1988: 2nd round, 45th overall pick
- Drafted by: Los Angeles Clippers
- Playing career: 1988–1998
- Position: Point guard
- Number: 22, 5
- Coaching career: 2003–present

Career history

Playing
- 1988–1991: Los Angeles Clippers
- 1991: San Antonio Spurs
- 1991–1992: Minnesota Timberwolves
- 1992: Dallas Mavericks
- 1992–1993: Rapid City Thrillers
- 1993–1995: Bayer Giants Leverkusen
- 1995–1996: Meysuspor
- 1996–1997: Caja San Fernando
- 1997–1998: Kombassan Konya

Coaching
- 2003–2009: Rhode Island (women's)
- 2009–2015: Vanderbilt (women's asst.)
- 2015–2018: Boston College (women's asst.)
- 2018–2021: UMass Lowell (women's)
- 2021–present: Vanderbilt (women's asst.)
- Stats at NBA.com
- Stats at Basketball Reference

Thomas S. Garrick (born July 7, 1966) is an American college basketball coach and former professional basketball player who was selected by the Los Angeles Clippers in the second round (45th overall pick) of the 1988 NBA draft. He played guard in four NBA seasons, mainly for the Clippers. Garrick's best year as a Clipper was during the 1989–90 NBA season when he averaged 7.0 ppg in 73 games. He played collegiately at the University of Rhode Island.

He was the head coach of the University of Rhode Island women's basketball team until he resigned following the 2008–09 season. From 2009 to 2015 he served as a women's basketball assistant coach at Vanderbilt University before moving on to Boston College for three seasons. He was the head women's basketball coach at UMass Lowell from 2018 to 2021, before he returned to Vanderbilt as an assistant to his wife Shea Ralph, who became head coach there.

== Career statistics ==
Legend
GP	Games played	GS	Games started	MPG	Minutes per game
FG%	Field goal percentage	3P%	3-point field goal percentage	FT%	Free throw percentage
RPG	Rebounds per game	APG	Assists per game	SPG	Steals per game
BPG	Blocks per game	PPG	Points per game	**Bold**	Career high

=== NBA ===
==== Regular season ====
Year	Team	GP	GS	MPG	FG%	3P%	FT%	RPG	APG	SPG	BPG	PPG
1988–89	L.A. Clippers	71	20	21.1	.490	.000	.803	**2.2**	3.4	1.1	.1	6.4
1989–90	L.A. Clippers	**73**	**22**	**23.6**	**.494**	.190	.772	**2.2**	**4.0**	1.2	.1	**7.0**
1990–91	L.A. Clippers	67	0	14.2	.424	.000	.759	1.9	3.3	.9	.0	3.9
1991–92	San Antonio	19	5	19.7	.473	.000	.625	**2.2**	3.3	1.1	.1	5.2
1991–92	Minnesota	15	0	7.5	.333	**.500**	.750	.6	1.2	.5	**.2**	1.9
1991–92	Dallas	6	0	10.5	.235	.000	**1.000**	1.0	2.8	**1.3**	.0	1.7
Career		251	47	18.8	.469	.083	.775	2.0	3.4	1.1	.1	5.4

== Head coaching record ==
Record table
Season	Team	Overall	Conference	Standing	Postseason
Rhode Island Rams (Atlantic 10 Conference) (2003–2009)
2003–04	Rhode Island	11–10	8–8	6th	
2004–05	Rhode Island	8–20	6–10	5th	
2005–06	Rhode Island	8–20	5–11	11th	
2006–07	Rhode Island	6–23	4–10	11th	
2007–08	Rhode Island	13–18	5–9	10th	
2008–09	Rhode Island	10–21	2–12	12th	
Rhode Island:		56–112 (.333)	31–60 (.341)		
UMass Lowell River Hawks (America East Conference) (2018–2021)
2018–19	UMass Lowell	7–22	3–13	8th	
2019–20	UMass Lowell	16–15	11–5	3rd	
2020–21	UMass Lowell	12–9	10–6	3rd	
UMass Lowell:		35–46 (.432)	24–24 (.500)		
Total:		91–158 (.365)			
National champion Postseason invitational champion Conference regular season champion Conference regular season and conference tournament champion Division regular season champion Division regular season and conference tournament champion Conference tournament champion

== Personal life ==
Garrick is married to Vanderbilt head coach, Shea Ralph.
