= 2019–20 Maine Black Bears women's basketball team =

Intercollegiate basketball season

2019–20 Maine Black Bears women's basketball
- Conference: America East Conference
- Record: 18–14 (12–4 America East)
- Head coach: Amy Vachon (3rd season)
- Assistant coaches: Courtney England; Tom Biskup; Parise Rossignol
- Home arena: Cross Insurance Center / Portland Exposition Building

2019–20 America East Conference women's basketball standings
	Conf.				Overall
Team	W		L	PCT	W		L	PCT
Stony Brook	14	–	2	.875	28	–	3	.903
Maine	12	–	4	.750	16	–	14	.533
UMass Lowell	11	–	5	.688	15	–	14	.517
Binghamton	10	–	6	.625	21	–	8	.724
New Hampshire	7	–	9	.438	10	–	18	.357
Vermont	6	–	10	.375	12	–	17	.414
UMBC	6	–	10	.375	10	–	17	.370
Albany	5	–	11	.313	9	–	20	.310
Hartford	1	–	15	.063	1	–	28	.034
† 2020 America East tournament winner Rankings from AP poll

The 2019–20 Maine Black Bears women's basketball team represented the University of Maine in the 2019–20 NCAA Division I women's basketball season. The Black Bears, led by third-year head coach Amy Vachon, played their home games at the Cross Insurance Center and were members of the America East Conference.

== Media ==
All home games and conference road games will stream on either ESPN3 or AmericaEast.tv. Most road games will stream on the opponents website. All games will be broadcast on the radio on WGUY and online on the Maine Portal.

== Roster ==
2019–20 Maine Black Bears women's basketball team
Players
Coaches

Pos.	#	Name	Height	Year	Previous school	Hometown
G	2	Sierra Tapley	5 ft 8 in (1.73 m)	Sr	Mount Desert Island	Bar Harbor, ME
G	3	Anne Simon	5 ft 8 in (1.73 m)	Fr	Sportlycee/Luxembourg National Team	Sandweiler, Luxembourg
G	4	Maddy McVicar	5 ft 4 in (1.63 m)	RS Sr	Calais	Calais, ME
F	5	Maeve Carroll	5 ft 11 in (1.8 m)	Jr	Georgetown Visitation Preparatory	Oakton, VA
G	10	Anna Kahelin	5 ft 11 in (1.8 m)	Fr	Helsinki Basketball Academy Marsky/Finland National Team	Helsinki, Finland
G	15	Dor Saar	5 ft 6 in (1.68 m)	Jr	Israeli Basketball Academy	Ma'anit, Israel
G	20	Kelly Fogarty	5 ft 9 in (1.75 m)	Jr	Walpole	Walpole, MA
F	21	Gadson Lefft	6 ft 0 in (1.83 m)	GS	Heathwood Hall/Phillips Academy	Lake Wylie, SC
G	22	Blanca Millán	5 ft 11 in (1.8 m)	Sr	Colegio Manuel Peleteiro	Santiago de Compostela, Spain
F	23	Abbe Laurence	6 ft 2 in (1.88 m)	Fr	Portsmouth	Portsmouth, NH
C	31	Kat Williams	6 ft 5 in (1.96 m)	Jr	Marjory Stoneman Douglas	Coral Springs, FL
F	32	Kira Barra	6 ft 3 in (1.91 m)	Jr	Theo Koch Schule	Dillingen, Germany
F	33	Alex Bolozova	6 ft 2 in (1.88 m)	Sr	Gymnazium Dominika Tatarku	Poprad, Slovakia
F	51	Fanny Wadling	6 ft 1 in (1.85 m)	Sr	Luleå Praktiska Gymnasium	Nacka, Sweden

Head coach

- Amy Vachon (Maine)

Assistant coach(es)

- Courtney England (Maine)
- Tom Biskup (Maine)
- Parise Rossignol (Maine)

Legend

- (C) Team captain
- (S) Suspended
- (I) Ineligible
- (W) Walk-on
- Injured
- Current redshirt

Roster

== Schedule and results ==
Date time, TV	Rank^{#}	Opponent^{#}	Result	Record	Site (attendance) city, state
Exhibition
10/27/2019*; 4:00 pm		Stonehill	W 78–56		Cross Insurance Center; Bangor, ME
11/3/2019*; 2:00 pm		McGill	W 61–22		Cross Insurance Center; Bangor, ME
Non-conference regular season
11/8/2019*; 1:00 pm, FloSports		at Delaware	W 69–56	1–0	Bob Carpenter Center (858); Newark, DE
11/11/2019*; 1:00 pm, ESPN+/NESN		at Brown	L 70–76 ^{ot}	1–1	Pizzitola Sports Center (235); Providence, RI
11/17/2019*; 1:00 pm, ESPN+		Boston University	L 49–62	1–2	Cross Insurance Center (1,652); Bangor, ME
11/19/2019*; 10:30 am, ACC Network		at NC State	L 34–62	1–3	Reynolds Coliseum (5,137); Raleigh, NC
11/24/2019*; 1:00 pm, AE.TV		vs. Navy	W 46–41	2–3	Portland Exposition Building (1,440); Portland, ME
11/29/2019*; 5:00 pm, FloSports		vs. Arizona State	L 31–57	2–4	Hertz Arena (573); Estero, FL
11/30/2019*; 1:40 pm, FloSports		vs. Drake	L 62–94	2–5	Hertz Arena (542); Estero, FL
12/1/2019*; 11:00 am, FloSports		vs. Dayton	L 49–78	2–6	Hertz Arena (311); Estero, FL
12/4/2019*; 7:00 pm, ESPN+		Husson	W 104–43	3–6	Cross Insurance Center (1,242); Bangor, ME
12/7/2019*; 1:00 pm, ESPN+		Harvard	L 40–69	3–7	Cross Insurance Center (1,343); Bangor, ME
12/10/2019*; 12:00 pm, ESPN+		Dartmouth	L 41–57	3–8	Leede Arena (1,371); Hanover, NH
12/13/2019*; 7:00 pm, ESPN+		Green Bay	W 61–60	4–8	Cross Insurance Center (1,182); Bangor, ME
12/21/2019*; 7:00 pm, ESPN+		Northeastern	L 58–66	4–9	Cross Insurance Center (1,147); Bangor, ME
12/21/2019*; 7:00 pm, FloSports		Drexel	L 57–70	4–10	Daskalakis Athletic Center (668); Philadelphia, PA
America East regular Season
1/2/2020; 7:00 pm, ESPN+		Hartford	W 87–73	5–10 (1–0)	Cross Insurance Center (1,013); Bangor, ME
1/5/2020; 2:00 pm, ESPN+		at Stony Brook	L 69–73	5–11 (1–1)	Island Federal Credit Union Arena (764); Stony Brook, NY
1/8/2020; 7:00 pm, ESPN+		New Hampshire	L 69–73	6–11 (2–1)	Cross Insurance Center (958); Bangor, ME
1/11/2020; 5:00 pm, ESPN+		Albany	W 60-49	7-11 (3-1)	Cross Insurance Center (1,149); Bangor, ME
1/15/2020; 11:00 am, ESPN+		at UMass Lowell	L 57-66	7-12 (3-2)	Tsongas Center (3,133); Lowell, MA
1/18/2020; 12:00 pm, ESPN+		at Binghamton	L 63-73	7-13 (3-3)	Binghamton University Events Center (1,858); Vestal, NY
1/22/2020; 6:00 pm, ESPN+		at Vermont	W 65-47	8-13 (4-3)	Patrick Gym (404); Burlington, VT
1/26/2020; 1:00 pm, ESPN+		UMBC	L 54-74	8-14 (4-4)	Cross Insurance Center (1,788); Bangor, ME
2/1/2020; 2:00 pm, ESPN+		at Hartford	W 69-52	9-14 (5-4)	Chase Arena at Reich Family Pavilion (795); West Hartford, CT
2/5/2020; 7:00 pm, ESPN+		Vermont	W 70-59	10-14 (6-4)	Cross Insurance Center (1,149); Bangor, ME
2/9/2020; 1:00 pm, ESPN+		Binghamton	W 75-65 ^{OT}	11-14 (7-4)	Cross Insurance Center (1,510); Bangor, ME
2/12/2020; 7:00 pm, ESPN+		UMass Lowell	W 77-53	12-14 (8-4)	Cross Insurance Center (1,267); Bangor, ME
2/15/2020; 5:00 pm, ESPN+		at Albany	W 65-44	13-14 (9-4)	SEFCU Arena (1,052); Albany, NY
2/23/2020; 1:00 pm, ESPN+		Stony Brook	W 64-62 ^{OT}	14-14 (10-4)	Cross Insurance Center (2,093); Bangor, ME
2/26/2020; 6:00 pm, ESPN+		at New Hampshire	W 71-62	15-14 (11-4)	Lundholm Gym (585); Durham, NH
2/29/2020; 1:00 pm, ESPN+		at UMBC	W 66-54	16-14 (12-4)	UMBC Event Center; Catonsville, MD
America East Women's Tournament
March 4, 2020; 7:00 pm, ESPN+	(2)	(7) Vermont; Quarterfinals	W 78-66	17-14	Cross Insurance Center (1,310); Bangor, ME
March 8, 2020; 1:00 pm, ESPN+	(2)	(3) UMass Lowell; Semifinals	W 67-54	18-14	Memorial Gym ("The Pit") (1,336); Orono, ME
March 13, 2020; 5:00 pm, ESPNU	(2)	(1) Stony Brook; Championship Game	Canceled		Island Federal Credit Union Arena; Stony Brook, NY
*Non-conference game. ^{#}Rankings from AP Poll. (#) Tournament seedings in parentheses. All times are in Eastern Time.

== See also ==
- 2019–20 Maine Black Bears men's basketball team
