= 2018–19 Vermont Catamounts women's basketball team =

Intercollegiate basketball season

2018–19 Vermont Catamounts women's basketball
- Conference: America East Conference
- Record: 11–18 (7–9 America East)
- Head coach: Alisa Kresge (Interim)
- Assistant coaches: Dominique Bryant; Eileen Van Horn; T. J. Sawyer
- Home arena: Patrick Gym

2018–19 America East Conference women's basketball standings
	Conf.				Overall
Team	W		L	PCT	W		L	PCT
Maine †	15	–	1	.938	25	–	8	.758
Hartford	14	–	2	.875	23	–	11	.676
Stony Brook	11	–	5	.688	23	–	8	.742
Albany	9	–	7	.563	13	–	18	.419
Binghamton	7	–	9	.438	12	–	18	.400
Vermont	7	–	9	.438	11	–	18	.379
UMBC	3	–	13	.188	10	–	20	.333
UMass Lowell	3	–	13	.188	7	–	22	.241
New Hampshire	3	–	13	.188	6	–	24	.200
† 2019 America East tournament winner

The 2018–19 Vermont Catamounts women's basketball team represented the University of Vermont during the 2018–19 NCAA Division I women's basketball season. The Catamounts, led by interim head coach Alisa Kresge, play their home games in the Patrick Gym are members in the America East Conference.

== Media ==
All non-televised home games and conference road games will stream on either ESPN3 or AmericaEast.tv. Select home games will be televised by the Northeast Sports Network. Most road games will stream on the opponents website. All games will be broadcast on WVMT 620 AM and streamed online through SportsJuice.com with Rob Ryan calling the action.

== Roster ==
2018–19 Vermont Catamounts women's basketball team
Players
Coaches

Pos.	#	Name	Height	Year	Previous school	Hometown
G	1	Asha Scott	5 ft 8 in (1.73 m)	Fr	St. John's College	Washington, D.C.
G	2	Nicole Crum	5 ft 9 in (1.75 m)	Fr	First Baptist School	Summerville, SC
G	3	Sarah Wells	5 ft 11 in (1.8 m)	Fr	Champlain College	Stanstead, QC
G	5	Josie Larkins	5 ft 9 in (1.75 m)	So	Red Bank Catholic	Lincroft, NJ
F	10	Hanna Crymble	6 ft 3 in (1.91 m)	Jr	Champlin Park	Champlin, MN
F	11	Candice Wright	6 ft 3 in (1.91 m)	Sr	Jacob Hespeler	Cambridge, ON
G	12	Eva Widmeyer	5 ft 9 in (1.75 m)	Fr	Marianapolis Prep	Dartmouth, NS
F	14	Lauren Handy	6 ft 2 in (1.88 m)	Sr	Northern Collegiate	Sarnia, ON
F	15	Cassidy Derda	6 ft 2 in (1.88 m)	RS Sr	Tilton School; St. Francis Brooklyn	South Burlington, VT
F	21	Courtney Wright	6 ft 0 in (1.83 m)	Sr	Jacob Hespeler	Cambridge, ON
G	22	Sophie Wittenbeck	5 ft 5 in (1.65 m)	Fr	Waterville	Waterville, NY
G	24	Rose Caverly	5 ft 10 in (1.78 m)	Fr	Red Bank Catholic	Brick, NJ
F	25	Abby Settelmeyer	6 ft 2 in (1.88 m)	Fr	Tilton School	Marblehead, MA
F	32	Carmen Handy	6 ft 3 in (1.91 m)	So	Northern Collegiate Institute	Sarnia, ON

Head coach

- Alisa Kresge (Marist)

Assistant coach(es)

- Dominique Bryant (Saint Joseph's)
- Eileen Van Horn (Marist)
- T. J. Sawyer (Endicott)

Legend

- (C) Team captain
- (S) Suspended
- (I) Ineligible
- (W) Walk-on
- Injured
- Current redshirt

Roster

== Schedule ==
Date time, TV	Rank^{#}	Opponent^{#}	Result	Record	Site (attendance) city, state
Exhibition
Nov 4, 2018*; 2:00 pm, AETV		Saint Michael's	W 76–49		Patrick Gym (414); Burlington, VT
Non-conference regular season
Nov 9, 2018*; 7:00 pm, ESPN+		Rider	W 54–49	1–0	Patrick Gym (252); Burlington, VT
Nov 11, 2018*; 3:00 pm, AETV		Dartmouth	L 42–66	1–1	Patrick Gym (509); Burlington, VT
Nov 15, 2018*; 7:00 pm, ESPN+		Norwich	W 78–28	2–1	Patrick Gym (380); Burlington, VT
Nov 18, 2018*; 2:00 pm, ESPN+		Rhode Island	L 58–61	2–2	Patrick Gym (266); Burlington, VT
Nov 23, 2018*; 4:00 pm, ESPN+		Wagner; TD Bank Classic semifinals	W 56–54 ^{OT}	3–2	Patrick Gym (266); Burlington, VT
Nov 24, 2018*; 4:00 pm, ESPN+		Drexel; TD Bank Classic championship	L 44–60	3–3	Patrick Gym (333); Burlington, VT
Nov 28, 2018*; 7:00 pm, ESPN+		Holy Cross	L 40–65	3–4	Patrick Gym (332); Burlington, VT
Dec 2, 2018*; 1:00 pm, ESPN+		at NJIT	W 71–63	4–4	Wellness and Events Center (405); Newark, NJ
Dec 8, 2018*; 2:00 pm, ESPN+		Yale	L 55–58	4–5	Patrick Gym (556); Burlington, VT
Dec 17, 2018*; 7:00 pm		at South Florida	L 55–102	4–6	Yuengling Center (2,116); Tampa, FL
Dec 21, 2018*; 2:00 pm, ESPN+		at Canisius	L 46–67	4–7	Koessler Athletic Center (606); Buffalo, NY
Dec 30, 2018*; 3:00 pm, ESPN+		at Kansas	L 36–77	4–8	Allen Fieldhouse (2,552); Lawrence, KS
America East regular season
Jan 2, 2019; 7:00 pm, ESPN3		at UMass Lowell	L 51–54	4–9 (0–1)	Costello Athletic Center (262); Lowell, MA
Jan 5, 2019; 2:00 pm, ESPN3		Albany	W 52–39	5–9 (1–1)	Patrick Gym (588); Burlington, VT
Jan 9, 2019; 7:00 pm, ESPN3		Maine	L 51–63	5–10 (1–2)	Patrick Gym (329); Burlington, VT
Jan 12, 2019; 2:00 pm, ESPN3		at Hartford	L 32–61	5–11 (1–3)	Chase Arena at Reich Family Pavilion (562); West Hartford, CT
Jan 16, 2019; 7:00 pm, ESPN+		New Hampshire	W 69–60	6–11 (2–3)	Patrick Gym (378); Burlington, VT
Jan 19, 2019; 12:00 pm, ESPN3		at Binghamton	W 58–57	7–11 (3–3)	Binghamton University Events Center (1,565); Vestal, NY
Jan 23, 2019; 11:00 am, ESPN+		at UMBC	W 58–44	8–11 (4–3)	UMBC Event Center (2,187); Catonsville, MD
Jan 26, 2019; 2:00 pm, ESPN3		Stony Brook	L 61–67	8–12 (4–4)	Patrick Gym (961); Burlington, VT
Feb 2, 2019; 2:00 pm, ESPN3		UMass Lowell	W 52–42	9–12 (5–4)	Patrick Gym (718); Burlington, VT
Feb 6, 2019; 7:00 pm, ESPN+		at Maine	L 45–66	9–13 (5–5)	Cross Insurance Center (1,279); Bangor, ME
Feb 9, 2019; 2:00 pm, ESPN+		at Albany	L 40–65	9–14 (5–6)	SEFCU Arena (936); Albany, NY
Feb 13, 2019; 7:00 pm, ESPN3		at New Hampshire	W 51–50	10–14 (6–6)	Lundholm Gym (141); Durham, NH
Feb 16, 2019; 2:00 pm, ESPN3		Hartford	L 48–76	10–15 (6–7)	Patrick Gym (589); Burlington, VT
Feb 20, 2019; 11:00 am, ESPN+		UMBC	W 58–50	11–15 (7–7)	Patrick Gym (1,605); Burlington, VT
Feb 23, 2019; 2:00 pm, ESPN3		Binghamton	L 50–59	11–16 (7–8)	Patrick Gym (599); Burlington, VT
Mar 2, 2019; 2:00 pm, ESPN3		at Stony Brook	L 48–58	11–17 (7–9)	Island Federal Credit Union Arena (938); Stony Brook, NY
America East Women's Tournament
Mar 6, 2019; 7:00 pm, ESPN+	(6)	at (3) Stony Brook; Quarterfinals	L 58–69	11–18	Island Federal Credit Union Arena (335); Stony Brook, NY
*Non-conference game. ^{#}Rankings from AP Poll. (#) Tournament seedings in parentheses. All times are in Eastern Time.

== See also ==
- 2018–19 Vermont Catamounts men's basketball team
