= 2019–20 Stony Brook Seawolves women's basketball team =

Intercollegiate basketball season

2019–20 Stony Brook Seawolves women's basketball

America East regular season and tournament champions
- Conference: America East Conference
- Record: 28–3 (14–2 America East)
- Head coach: Caroline McCombs (6th season)
- Assistant coaches: Jeff Williams; Bri Hutchen; Gabe Lazo
- Home arena: Island Federal Credit Union Arena

2019–20 America East Conference women's basketball standings
	Conf.				Overall
Team	W		L	PCT	W		L	PCT
Stony Brook	14	–	2	.875	28	–	3	.903
Maine	12	–	4	.750	16	–	14	.533
UMass Lowell	11	–	5	.688	15	–	14	.517
Binghamton	10	–	6	.625	21	–	8	.724
New Hampshire	7	–	9	.438	10	–	18	.357
Vermont	6	–	10	.375	12	–	17	.414
UMBC	6	–	10	.375	10	–	17	.370
Albany	5	–	11	.313	9	–	20	.310
Hartford	1	–	15	.063	1	–	28	.034
† 2020 America East tournament winner Rankings from AP poll

The 2019–20 Stony Brook Seawolves women's basketball team represent Stony Brook University during the 2019–20 NCAA Division I women's basketball season. The Seawolves, led by sixth-year head coach Caroline McCombs, play their home games at the Island Federal Credit Union Arena and are members in the America East Conference.

The season saw Stony Brook break program records for longest win streak, most wins under McCombs and most wins in program history. Stony Brook won the America East regular season championship for the first time in program history. On February 8, 2020, the Seawolves took over the longest winning streak in the country with 20 games after Gonzaga lost. Stony Brook had the longest winning streak in the country at 22 games until they lost to Maine on February 23.

Stony Brook earned the No. 1 seed in the America East tournament for the first time. Stony Brook advanced to the America East Championship for the third time and was set to take on Maine, but the game was canceled as a result to the COVID-19 pandemic. Stony Brook was named the America East tournament champion due to being the highest seed remaining.

== Media ==
All non-televised home games and conference road games will be streamed on ESPN3 or ESPN+.

== Roster ==
2019–20 Stony Brook Seawolves women's basketball team
Players
Coaches

Pos.	#	Name	Height	Year	Previous school	Hometown
G	0	Gigi Gonzalez	5 ft 7 in (1.7 m)	Fr	Nova	Miramar, FL
F	1	Courtney Furr	6 ft 0 in (1.83 m)	So	Howard	Elkridge, MD
F	2	Cheyenne Clark	5 ft 11 in (1.8 m)	GS	Deptford Township; Mohawk Valley CC	Deptford, NJ
F	3	Oksana Gouchie-Provencher	6 ft 4 in (1.93 m)	RS Jr	Bill Crothers Secondary	Markham, ON
G	4	Anastasia Warren	5 ft 8 in (1.73 m)	So	Westlake	Atlanta, GA
G/F	5	Jonae Cox	5 ft 11 in (1.8 m)	Jr	Woodrow Wilson	Portsmouth, VA
G	10	Chantz Cherry	5 ft 7 in (1.7 m)	Jr	Southwest DeKalb	Decatur, GA
F	12	Kina Smith	6 ft 1 in (1.85 m)	Sr	Urban Assembly School	Bronx, NY
G	14	Leah Burden	5 ft 7 in (1.7 m)	Fr	Ferguson	Westbury, NY
G	15	Kaela Hilaire	5 ft 2 in (1.57 m)	GS	Seton Hall	Queens, NY
F	22	McKenzie Bushee	6 ft 1 in (1.85 m)	Jr	Mt. Lebanon	Pittsburgh, PA
F	23	Aminata Zie	6 ft 1 in (1.85 m)	Fr	Gaspard Monge	Paris, France
G/F	24	Hailey Zeise	5 ft 10 in (1.78 m)	Jr	North Allegheny	Pittsburgh, PA
F	30	Kyra Dixon	5 ft 11 in (1.8 m)	RS Jr	Collins Hill	Lawrenceville, GA
F	33	India Pagán	6 ft 1 in (1.85 m)	Jr	New London	New London, CT

Head coach

- Caroline McCombs (Youngstown State)

Assistant coach(es)

- Jeff Williams (Howard)
- Bri Hutchen (Alabama)
- Dario Hernandez (Shaw)

Legend

- (C) Team captain
- (S) Suspended
- (I) Ineligible
- (W) Walk-on
- Injured
- Current redshirt

Roster

== Schedule ==
Date time, TV	Rank^{#}	Opponent^{#}	Result	Record	Site (attendance) city, state
Non-conference regular season
November 5, 2019*; 7:00 pm, NEC Front Row		at St. Francis Brooklyn	W 86–73	1–0	Pope Physical Education Center (286); Brooklyn Heights, NY
November 8, 2019*; 6:31 pm, ESPN3		Manhattan	W 59–54	2–0	Island Federal Credit Union Arena (719); Stony Brook, NY
November 13, 2019*; 7:00 pm, FloSports		at Hofstra	W 81–38	3–0	Mack Sports Complex (607); Hempstead, NY
November 17, 2019*; 2:00 pm		at No. 23 Arkansas	L 58–88	3–1	Bud Walton Arena (2,045); Fayetteville, AR
November 21, 2019*; 6:31 pm, ESPN+		Iona	W 59–40	4–1	Island Federal Credit Union Arena (661); Stony Brook, NY
November 24, 2019*; 2:00 pm, ESPN+		Sacred Heart	W 54–50	5–1	Island Federal Credit Union Arena (737); Stony Brook, NY
November 27, 2019*; 1:00 pm, NEC Front Row		at LIU	W 80–49	6–1	Steinberg Wellness Center (113); Brooklyn, NY
December 3, 2019*; 6:31 pm, ESPN3		Molloy	W 66–49	7–1	Island Federal Credit Union Arena (667); Stony Brook, NY
December 8, 2019*; 2:00 pm, ACCN		at Pittsburgh	W 59–56	8–1	Petersen Events Center (1,149); Pittsburgh, PA
December 15, 2019*; 1:00 pm, NEC Front Row		at Wagner	W 66–45	9–1	Spiro Sports Center (289); Staten Island, NY
December 20, 2019*; 1:30 pm, FloSports		vs. Morgan State; Puerto Rico Clasico	W 63–56	10–1	Coliseo Rubén Rodríguez; San Juan, Puerto Rico
December 22, 2019*; 1:30 pm, FloSports		vs. Western Michigan; Puerto Rico Clasico	W 50–47	11–1	Coliseo Rubén Rodríguez; San Juan, Puerto Rico
December 29, 2019*; 2:00 pm, ESPN3		Bucknell	W 78–73 ^{2OT}	12–1	Island Federal Credit Union Arena (2,488); Stony Brook, NY
America East Conference regular season
January 2, 2020; 6:31 pm, ESPN+		UMBC	W 57–45	13–1 (1–0)	Island Federal Credit Union Arena (609); Stony Brook, NY
January 5, 2020; 2:00 pm, ESPN+		Maine	W 73–69	14–1 (2–0)	Island Federal Credit Union Arena (764); Stony Brook, NY
January 8, 2020; 6:31 pm, ESPN3		Vermont	W 67–49	15–1 (3–0)	Island Federal Credit Union Arena (508); Stony Brook, NY
January 11, 2020; 1:00 pm, ESPN3		at New Hampshire	W 53–44 ^{OT}	16–1 (4–0)	Lundholm Gym; Durham, NH
January 15, 2020; 6:31 pm, ESPN+		Hartford	W 66–55	17–1 (5–0)	Island Federal Credit Union Arena (602); Stony Brook, NY
January 18, 2020; 2:00 pm, ESPN3		at Albany	W 73–53	18–1 (6–0)	SEFCU Arena (1,166); Albany, NY
January 22, 2020; 7:00 pm, ESPN3		at Binghamton	W 67–60	19–1 (7–0)	Binghamton University Events Center (1,332); Binghamton, NY
January 29, 2020; 6:31 pm, ESPN+		UMass Lowell	W 60–41	20–1 (8–0)	Island Federal Credit Union Arena (845); Stony Brook, NY
February 1, 2020; 1:00 pm, ESPN3		at UMBC	W 66–49	21–1 (9–0)	UMBC Event Center (813); Baltimore, MD
February 5, 2020; 7:00 pm, ESPN+		at UMass Lowell	W 89–69	22–1 (10–0)	Tsongas Center (471); Lowell, MA
February 8, 2020; 2:00 pm, ESPN3		New Hampshire	W 52–50	23–1 (11–0)	Island Federal Credit Union Arena (1,279); Stony Brook, NY
February 12, 2020; 6:31 pm, ESPN+		Binghamton	W 58–54	24–1 (12–0)	Island Federal Credit Union Arena (1,048); Stony Brook, NY
February 19, 2020; 6:00 pm, ESPN+		at Vermont	W 72–68	25–1 (13–0)	Patrick Gym (453); Burlington, VT
February 23, 2020; 1:00 pm, ESPN+		at Maine	L 62–64 ^{OT}	25–2 (13–1)	Cross Insurance Center (2,093); Bangor, ME
February 26, 2020; 7:00 pm, ESPN+		at Hartford	L 67–70	25–3 (13–2)	Chase Arena at Reich Family Pavilion (598); West Hartford, CT
February 29, 2020; 12:30 pm, SNY		Albany	W 53–44	26–3 (14–2)	Island Federal Credit Union Arena (1,175); Stony Brook, NY
America East Women's Tournament
March 4, 2020; 6:31 pm, ESPN+	(1)	(8) Albany; Quarterfinals	W 54–49 ^{OT}	27–3	Island Federal Credit Union Arena (940); Stony Brook, NY
March 8, 2020; 4:00 pm, ESPN+	(1)	(4) Binghamton; Semifinals	W 57–42	28–3	Island Federal Credit Union Arena (1,142); Stony Brook, NY
March 13, 2020; 5:00 pm, ESPNU	(1)	(2) Maine; Championship Game	Canceled		Island Federal Credit Union Arena; Stony Brook, NY
*Non-conference game. ^{#}Rankings from AP Poll. (#) Tournament seedings in parentheses. All times are in Eastern.

== See also ==
- 2019–20 Stony Brook Seawolves men's basketball team
