= 2018–19 Stony Brook Seawolves women's basketball team =

Intercollegiate basketball season

2018–19 Stony Brook Seawolves women's basketball
- Conference: America East Conference
- Record: 23–8 (11–5 America East)
- Head coach: Caroline McCombs (5th season)
- Assistant coaches: Jeff Williams; Bri Hutchen; Dario Hernandez
- Home arena: Island Federal Credit Union Arena

2018–19 America East Conference women's basketball standings
	Conf.				Overall
Team	W		L	PCT	W		L	PCT
Maine †	15	–	1	.938	25	–	8	.758
Hartford	14	–	2	.875	23	–	11	.676
Stony Brook	11	–	5	.688	23	–	8	.742
Albany	9	–	7	.563	13	–	18	.419
Binghamton	7	–	9	.438	12	–	18	.400
Vermont	7	–	9	.438	11	–	18	.379
UMBC	3	–	13	.188	10	–	20	.333
UMass Lowell	3	–	13	.188	7	–	22	.241
New Hampshire	3	–	13	.188	6	–	24	.200
† 2019 America East tournament winner

The 2018–19 Stony Brook Seawolves women's basketball team represented Stony Brook University during the 2018–19 NCAA Division I women's basketball season. The Seawolves, led by fifth-year head coach Caroline McCombs, play their home games at the Island Federal Credit Union Arena and were members in the America East Conference. They finished the season 23–8, 11–5 in America East play to finish in third place. They defeated Vermont in the quarterfinals before losing to Hartford in the semifinals of the America East women's tournament.

== Media ==
All non-televised home games and conference road games will stream on either ESPN3 or AmericaEast.tv. Most road games will stream on the opponents website. All games will have an audio broadcast streamed online through the Pack Network.

== Roster ==
2018–19 Stony Brook Seawolves women's basketball team
Players
Coaches

Pos.	#	Name	Height	Year	Previous school	Hometown
F	1	Courtney Furr	6 ft 0 in (1.83 m)	Fr	Howard	Elkridge, MD
F	2	Cheyenne Clark	5 ft 11 in (1.8 m)	Sr	Deptford Township; Mohawk Valley CC	Deptford, NJ
F	3	Oksana Gouchie-Provencher	6 ft 4 in (1.93 m)	RS So	Bill Crothers Secondary	Markham, ON
G	4	Anastasia Warren	5 ft 8 in (1.73 m)	Fr	Westlake	Atlanta, GA
G/F	5	Jonae Cox	5 ft 11 in (1.8 m)	So	Woodrow Wilson	Portsmouth, VA
G	10	Chantz Cherry	5 ft 7 in (1.7 m)	So	Southwest DeKalb	Decatur, GA
G	11	Jerell Matthews	5 ft 9 in (1.75 m)	Sr	Marian Catholic	Chicago, IL
F	12	Kina Smith	6 ft 1 in (1.85 m)	Jr	Utica Academy of Science Charter School	Bronx, NY
G	14	Giolibeth Pérez	5 ft 7 in (1.7 m)	Jr	Ferguson	Camuy, PR
G	15	Shania Johnson	5 ft 1 in (1.55 m)	Sr	Monroe College	Frederick, MD
F	22	McKenzie Bushee	6 ft 1 in (1.85 m)	So	Mt. Lebanon	Pittsburgh, PA
G/F	23	Laniya Miller	5 ft 10 in (1.78 m)	Fr	Piscataway	Piscataway, NJ
G/F	24	Hailey Zeise	5 ft 10 in (1.78 m)	So	North Allegheny	Pittsburgh, PA
F	30	Kyra Dixon	5 ft 11 in (1.8 m)	RS So	Collins Hill	Lawrenceville, GA
F	33	India Pagan	6 ft 1 in (1.85 m)	So	New London	New London, CT

Head coach

- Caroline McCombs (Youngstown State)

Assistant coach(es)

- Jeff Williams (Howard)
- Bri Hutchen (Alabama)
- Dario Hernandez (Shaw)

Legend

- (C) Team captain
- (S) Suspended
- (I) Ineligible
- (W) Walk-on
- Injured
- Current redshirt

Roster

== Schedule ==
Date time, TV	Rank^{#}	Opponent^{#}	Result	Record	Site (attendance) city, state
Non-conference regular season
November 9, 2018*; 12:00 pm, BTN+		at Rutgers	L 47–61	0–1	Rutgers Athletic Center (1,187); Piscataway, NJ
November 13, 2018*; 7:00 pm, AETV		Hofstra	W 77–49	1–1	Island Federal Credit Union Arena (397); Stony Brook, NY
November 17, 2018*; 2:00 pm, ESPN3		at Manhattan	W 79–48	2–1	Draddy Gymnasium (250); Bronx, NY
November 20, 2018*; 7:00 pm, AETV		Georgia Southern	W 72–43	3–1	Island Federal Credit Union Arena (210); Stony Brook, NY
November 25, 2018*; 2:00 pm, BTN+		at Penn State	W 81–70	4–1	Bryce Jordan Center (2,018); University Park, PA
November 28, 2018*; 7:00 pm, AETV		New Paltz	W 87–50	5–1	Island Federal Credit Union Arena (536); Stony Brook, NY
December 1, 2018*; 5:00 pm, AETV		Cornell	W 63–61	6–1	Island Federal Credit Union Arena (3,123); Stony Brook, NY
December 4, 2018*; 6:00 pm, NEC Front Row		at Sacred Heart	W 73–58	7–1	William H. Pitt Center (224); Fairfield, CT
December 8, 2018*; 2:00 pm, AETV		Fairleigh Dickinson	W 63–49	8–1	Island Federal Credit Union Arena (603); Stony Brook, NY
December 11, 2018*; 7:00 pm, ESPN3		at Iona	W 53–51	9–1	Hynes Athletic Center (437); New Rochelle, NY
December 15, 2018*; 2:00 pm, ESPN+		Wagner	W 70–45	10–1	Island Federal Credit Union Arena (524); Stony Brook, NY
December 18, 2018*; 3:00 pm, ESPN3		at Toledo	L 48–80	10–2	Savage Arena (3,235); Toledo, OH
December 30, 2018*; 2:00 pm, ESPN3		St. Francis Brooklyn	W 74–67	11–2	Island Federal Credit Union Arena (623); Stony Brook, NY
American East regular season
January 2, 2019; 7:00 pm, ESPN+		Hartford	L 36–64	11–3 (0–1)	Island Federal Credit Union Arena (205); Stony Brook, NY
January 5, 2019; 7:00 pm, ESPN3		UMass Lowell	W 76–56	12–3 (1–1)	Island Federal Credit Union Arena (791); Stony Brook, NY
January 9, 2019; 7:00 pm, ESPN+		at Binghamton	W 65–56	13–3 (2–1)	Binghamton University Events Center (1,517); Vestal, NY
January 12, 2019; 1:00 pm, ESPN3		at New Hampshire	W 82–63	14–3 (3–1)	Lundholm Gym (314); Durham, NH
January 19, 2019; 7:00 pm, ESPN3		Maine	L 54–68	14–4 (3–2)	Island Federal Credit Union Arena (683); Stony Brook, NY
January 23, 2019; 7:00 pm, ESPN+		Albany	L 49–54	14–5 (3–3)	Island Federal Credit Union Arena (651); Stony Brook, NY
January 26, 2019; 2:00 pm, ESPN3		at Vermont	W 67–61	15–5 (4–3)	Patrick Gym (961); Burlington, VT
January 30, 2019; 7:00 pm, ESPN+		UMBC	W 57–44	16–5 (5–3)	Island Federal Credit Union Arena (506); Stony Brook, NY
February 2, 2019; 2:00 pm, ESPN3		at Hartford	L 62–73	16–6 (5–4)	Chase Arena at Reich Family Pavilion (858); West Hartford, CT
February 6, 2019; 7:00 pm, ESPN3		Binghamton	W 68–53	17–6 (6–4)	Island Federal Credit Union Arena (1,002); Stony Brook, NY
February 9, 2019; 1:00 pm, ESPN+		at UMass Lowell	W 64–47	18–6 (7–4)	Costello Athletic Center (356); Lowell, MA
February 16, 2019; 2:00 pm, ESPN3		New Hampshire	W 67–37	19–6 (8–4)	Island Federal Credit Union Arena (1,209); Stony Brook, NY
February 20, 2019; 7:00 pm, ESPN+		at Albany	W 68–52	20–6 (9–4)	SEFCU Arena (884); Albany, NY
February 24, 2019; 1:00 pm, ESPN+		at Maine	L 61–71	20–7 (9–5)	Augusta Civic Center (1,008); Augusta, ME
February 27, 2019; 7:00 pm, ESPN+		at UMBC	W 70–59	21–7 (10–5)	UMBC Event Center (604); Catonsville, MD
March 2, 2019; 2:00 pm, ESPN3		Vermont	W 58–48	22–7 (11–5)	Island Federal Credit Union Arena (938); Stony Brook, NY
America East Women's Tournament
March 6, 2019; 7:00 pm, ESPN+	(3)	(6) Vermont; Quarterfinals	W 69–58	23–7	Island Federal Credit Union Arena (335); Stony Brook, NY
March 10, 2019; 7:00 pm, ESPN+	(3)	at (2) Hartford; Semifinals	L 59–64	23–8	Chase Arena at Reich Family Pavilion (742); West Hartford, CT
*Non-conference game. ^{#}Rankings from AP Poll. (#) Tournament seedings in parentheses. All times are in Eastern.

== See also ==
- 2018–19 Stony Brook Seawolves men's basketball team
