= 2019 America East women's basketball tournament =

- Classification: Division I
- Season: 2018–19
- Teams: 8
- Site: Campus Sites
- Champions: Maine (9th title)
- Winning coach: Amy Vachon (2nd title)
- MVP: Blanca Millán (Maine)
- Attendance: 8,303
- Television: ESPNU/ESPN+
- America East women's basketball tournaments

2018–19 America East Conference women's basketball standings
	Conf.				Overall
Team	W		L	PCT	W		L	PCT
Maine †	15	–	1	.938	25	–	8	.758
Hartford	14	–	2	.875	23	–	11	.676
Stony Brook	11	–	5	.688	23	–	8	.742
Albany	9	–	7	.563	13	–	18	.419
Binghamton	7	–	9	.438	12	–	18	.400
Vermont	7	–	9	.438	11	–	18	.379
UMBC	3	–	13	.188	10	–	20	.333
UMass Lowell	3	–	13	.188	7	–	22	.241
New Hampshire	3	–	13	.188	6	–	24	.200
† 2019 America East tournament winner

The 2019 America East Conference women's basketball tournament began on March 6 and concluded with the championship game on March 15. Maine won the championship game over Hartford to earn the automatic bid to the NCAA Division I women's basketball tournament.

== Seeds ==
Teams are seeded by record within the conference, with a tiebreaker system to seed teams with identical conference records.

Seed	School	Conf	Overall	Tiebreaker
#1	Maine	15–1	22–7	1 conference loss to Hartford.
#2	Hartford	14–2	21–9	
#3	Stony Brook	11–5	22–7	
#4	Albany	9–7	12–17	
#5	Binghamton	7–9	12–17	1–1 vs. Vermont, 2–0 vs. UMass Lowell
#6	Vermont	7–9	11–17	1–1 vs. Binghamton, 1–1 vs. UMass Lowell
#7	UMBC	3–13	6–23	2–0 vs. UNH, 0–2 vs. UMass Lowell
#8	New Hampshire	3–13	6–23	2–0 vs. UMass Lowell, 0–2 vs. UMBC
DNQ	UMass Lowell	3–13	7–22	0–2 vs. UNH, 0–2 vs. UMBC

== Schedule ==
All tournament games are nationally televised on an ESPN network:

Game	Time*	Matchup^{#}	Television	Attendance
Quarterfinals – Wednesday, March 6
1	7:00 pm	#8 New Hampshire at #1 Maine	ESPN+	1,764
2	7:00 pm	#7 UMBC at #2 Hartford	ESPN+	523
3	7:00 pm	#6 Vermont at #3 Stony Brook	ESPN+	335
4	7:00 pm	#5 Binghamton at #4 Albany	ESPN+	472
Semifinals – Sunday, March 10
5	1:00 pm	#4 Albany at #1 Maine	ESPN+	1,233
6	2:00 pm	#3 Stony Brook at #2 Hartford	ESPN+	742
Championship Game – Friday, March 15
7	5:00 pm	#2 Hartford at #1 Maine	ESPNU	3,234
*Game Times in EST. #-Rankings denote tournament seeding.

== Bracket and Results ==
Teams are reseeded after each round with highest remaining seeds receiving home court advantage.

Quarterfinals; Wednesday, March 6, 2019; ESPN+
1	Maine	69
8	New Hampshire	36
4	Albany	61
5	Binghamton	56
(Pairings are reseeded after the first round)
2	Hartford	65
7	UMBC	48
3	Stony Brook	69
6	Vermont	58

Semifinals; Sunday, March 10, 2019; ESPN+
1	Maine	66
4	Albany	51
2	Hartford	64
3	Stony Brook	59

Championship Game; Friday, March 15, 2019; ESPNU
1	Maine	68
2	Hartford	48

All times listed are Eastern

== See also ==
- 2019 America East men's basketball tournament
