= List of St. Francis Brooklyn Terriers women's basketball head coaches =

The following is a list of St. Francis Brooklyn Terriers women's basketball head coaches. The Terriers have had 13 coaches in their 45-season history. The team is currently coached by Linda Cimino.

| Tenure | Coach | Years | Record | Pct. |
|---|---|---|---|---|
| 1973–74 | Christine McGowan | 1 | 9–5 | .643 |
| 1974–79 | Dianne Nolan | 5 | 61–57 | .517 |
| 1979–82 | Mary Convy | 3 | 25–51 | .329 |
| 1982–83 | John Woods | 1 | 5–22 | .185 |
| 1983–86 | Dominick Vulpis | 3 | 27–49 | .355 |
| 1986–87 | Kevin A. Jones | 1 | 14–15 | .483 |
| 1987–88 | Cecil King | 1 | 4–22 | .154 |
| 1988–99 | Irma Garcia | 6 | 68–288 | .191 |
| 1999–00 | Steve Fagan | 1 | 2–25 | .074 |
| 2000–03 | Christine Cunningham | 3 | 9–72 | .111 |
| 2003–12 | Brenda Milano | 9 | 58–201 | .224 |
| 2012–18 | John Thurston | 6 | 73–110 | .399 |
| 2018–present | Linda Cimino | 2 | 26–34 | .433 |
| Totals | 13 coaches | 47 seasons | 384–872 | .306 |
