= St. Francis Brooklyn Terriers =

Intercollegiate sports teams of St. Francis College

- University: St. Francis College
- Nickname: Terriers
- NCAA: Division I
- Conference: NEC (1986–2023); NWPC (men's water polo); MAAC (women's water polo)
- Athletic director: Irma Garcia
- Location: Brooklyn, New York
- Varsity teams: 21
- Basketball arena: Generoso Pope Athletic Complex
- Soccer stadium: Brooklyn Bridge Park, Pier 5
- Other venues: SFC Aquatics Center
- Colors: Royal blue and red
- Mascot: Rocky the Terrier
- Website: sfcathletics.com

The St. Francis Brooklyn Terriers were the 21 teams that represented St. Francis College in athletics. The Terriers were members of NCAA Division I and participated in the Northeast Conference (NEC) except in two sports that the NEC does not sponsor—men's and women's water polo. The water polo teams respectively competed in the Collegiate Water Polo Association and the Metro Atlantic Athletic Conference.

The school's mascot was Rocky the Terrier, who was officially introduced in 1933 by the college's athletic association. Previously the St. Francis's student-athletes were referred to as the Boys from Brooklyn. Notably, the St. Francis Brooklyn men's basketball program was founded in 1896 and was the oldest collegiate program in New York City. The basketball, volleyball, water polo, and swimming and diving teams for the Terriers competed in the Generoso Pope Athletic Complex. The soccer teams completed at Brooklyn Bridge Park, Pier 5.

On March 20, 2023, St. Francis College announced that it would end intercollegiate athletic competition at the close of the spring semester due to financial and enrollment concerns.

== History ==
In 2006, St. Francis College added women's bowling, while dropping men's baseball and women's softball.

St. Francis College previously sponsored a football team, but was dropped in 1935. Their last coach was Julius "Indian" Yablok a former quarterback at Colgate University, who replaced Salvatore "Tut" Maggio.

In 2007, Irma Garcia became the athletic director of the Terriers replacing longtime director Edward Aquilone. When hired in 2010, she was the country's only female Latina athletic director in Division I sports. For the 2014–15 academic year, Garcia was named NACWAA D1 (FCS) Administrator of the Year. The award was in part because of the Terriers success in Men's Soccer (NEC Champions and NCAA tournament Participants), Men's Basketball (NEC Regular season Champions and NIT Participants) and Women's Basketball (NEC Champions and NCAA tournament Participants).

Beginning on November 27, 2012, St. Francis College rebranded its athletic programs from St. Francis (NY) to St. Francis Brooklyn. The college previously came to be known as St. Francis (NY) when the athletics program joined the Division I Northeast Conference in 1981. In 2018 it was announced that women's soccer and men's volleyball would be added as sports programs to the existing teams at St. Francis College. Both teams started play in the 2019–20 school year, with women's soccer starting in fall 2019 and men's volleyball in spring 2020.

On September 30, 2021, the NEC announced it would start a men's volleyball league in the 2023 season (2022–23 school year). The new league was intended to start with SFC as one of six members, but two more schools were announced as single-sport members before the league began play. Before the launch of NEC men's volleyball, SFC had played the 2022 season in the Eastern Intercollegiate Volleyball Association, which it had joined in July 2021.

On March 20, 2023, the school announced all athletics programs would be terminated at the end of the Spring 2023 semester. Students on athletic scholarship will be able to keep them until graduation or transfer to another school.

== Teams ==
A member of the Northeast Conference, St. Francis Brooklyn sponsored teams in 10 men's and 11 women's NCAA sanctioned sports:

Men's Intercollegiate Sports

- Basketball (team article)
- Cross Country
- Golf
- Soccer (team article)
- Swimming & Diving (Note: The NCAA treats swimming and diving as a single sport.)
- Tennis
- Track & Field (Indoor & Outdoor) (Note: The NCAA treats indoor and outdoor track as two separate sports, holding indoor championships in its winter season and outdoor championships in its spring season.)
- Volleyball
- Water Polo

Women's Intercollegiate Sports

- Basketball (team article)
- Bowling
- Cross Country
- Golf
- Soccer (team article)
- Swimming & Diving
- Tennis
- Track & Field (Indoor & Outdoor)
- Volleyball
- Water Polo

=== Basketball ===
Both the men's and women's teams hosted their home games at The Pope and were members of the Northeast Conference. The fiercest rival of the Terriers was LIU; the men's teams have competed since 1928 and the women's teams since 1973. (Note: Before the 2019–20 school year, the rivalry involved Long Island University's Brooklyn campus, known athletically as "LIU" or "Long Island" before 2013 and "LIU Brooklyn" from 2013–14. LIU merged the Brooklyn athletic program with that of its Post campus in 2019, creating the current LIU Sharks.) Both the men's and women's Terrier teams played in the Battle of Brooklyn tournament against the Sharks, which was played annually since 1974–75. The Terriers also competed against the Wagner Seahawks, and it was referred to as Battle of the Verrazano due to St. Francis College in Brooklyn being separated from Wagner College in Staten Island by the Verrazzano–Narrows Bridge. The Battle of the Verrazano dates back to the 1973–74 season. The team played its home games on the Peter Aquilone Court at the Generoso Pope Athletic Complex.

==== Men's ====
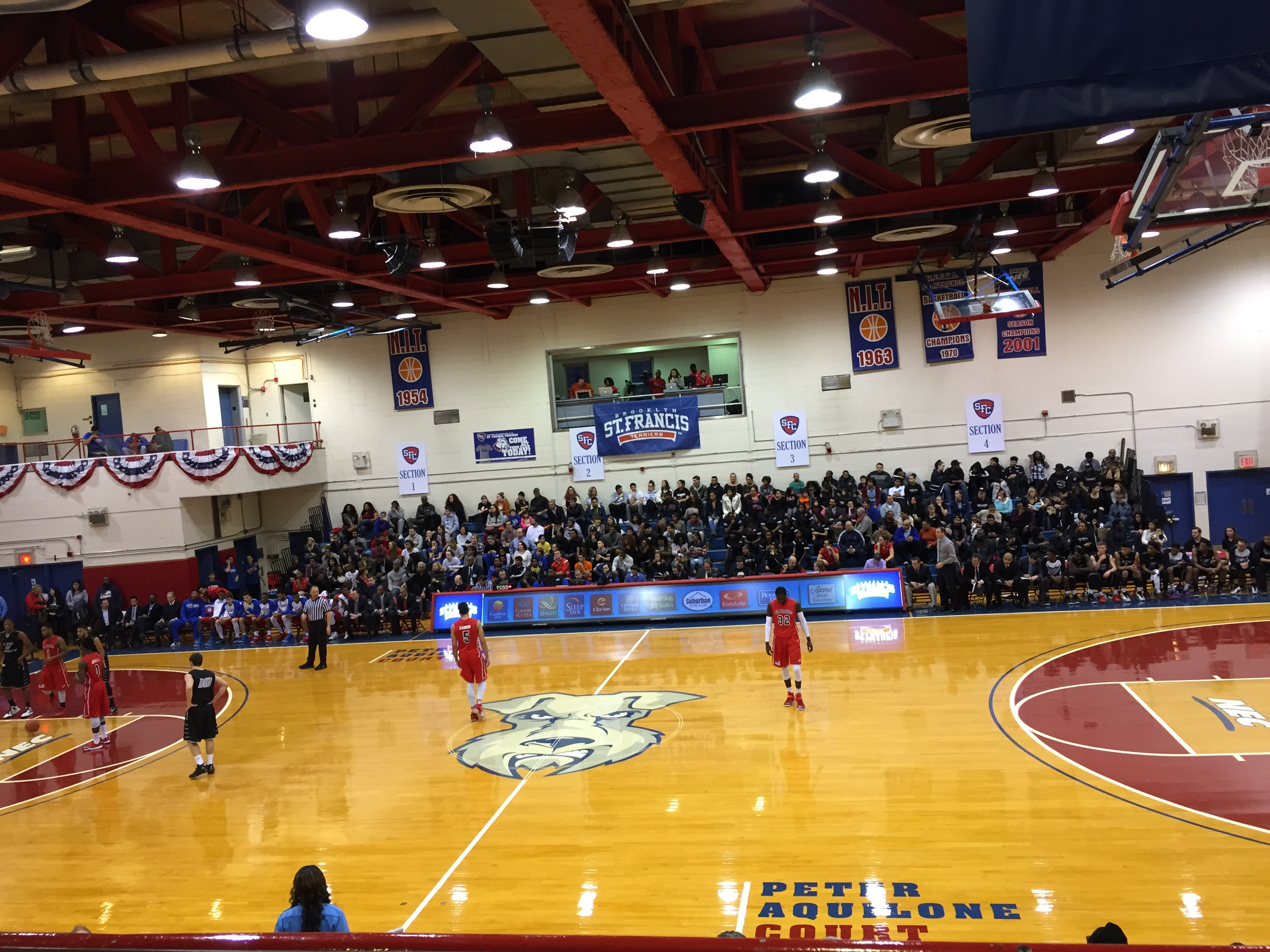
St. Francis vs LIU in the annual Battle of Brooklyn at The Pope on January 31, 2015.

The St. Francis College's men's basketball program, founded in 1896, was the oldest collegiate program in New York City. The Terriers' best finish was the 1955–1956 season, with a 21–4 record that ranked them at 13th nationally in the AP polls. Throughout their history the Terriers played as NCAA Division I independents, in the Metropolitan New York Conference (1946–1963), in the Metropolitan Collegiate Conference (1966–1968) and since 1981 in the NEC. In that time span, the Terriers were regular season conference champions 6 times and have had 17 different head coaches, the latest of which is Glenn Braica. Braica was an assistant under Norm Roberts at St. John's University. Glenn Braica replaced Brian Nash who resigned after five seasons, 3 of which his team did not make the postseason.

The Terriers coach with the most wins is Daniel Lynch who from 1948 to 1969 accumulated a 282–233 record and won 3 regular season conference championships. Lynch also led the Terriers to 3 NIT bids, reaching the first-round in 1963, the quarter-finals in 1954 and the semi-finals in 1956. Second is Ron Ganulin, who over 14 seasons, from 1991 to 2005, accumulated a 187–206 record along with 2 regular season conference championships.

Men's basketball yearly record
Year	Head coach	Overall record (W-L)	NEC Record	Standing	NEC Tournament Record	Postseason Tournament Record
2005–2006	Brian Nash	10–17	7–11	T-8th	DNQ	
2006–2007	Brian Nash	9–22	7–11	T-6th	0–1 Quarter-Finals	
2007–2008	Brian Nash	7–22	5–12	T-8th	DNQ	
2008–2009	Brian Nash	10–20	7–11	8th	0–1 Quarter-Finals	
2009–2010	Brian Nash	11–18	8–10	T-8th	DNQ	
2010–2011	Glenn Braica	15–15	10–9	5th	0–1 Quarter-Finals	
2011–2012	Glenn Braica	15–15	12–6	4th	0–1 Quarter-Finals	
2012–2013	Glenn Braica	12–18	8–10	8th	0–1 Quarter-Finals	
2013–2014	Glenn Braica	18–14	9–7	T-4th	0–1 Quarter-Finals	
2014–2015	Glenn Braica	23–12	15–3	1st	2–1 Finals	NIT First round 0–1
2015–2016	Glenn Braica	15–17	11–7	T-2nd	0–1 Quarter-Finals	
2016–2017	Glenn Braica	4–27	2–16	10th	DNQ	
2017–2018	Glenn Braica	13–18	10–8	T-4th	0–1 Quarter-Finals	
2018–2019	Glenn Braica	17–16	9–9	T-5th	0–1 Quarter-Finals	CIT First round 0–1
2019–2020	Glenn Braica	13–18	7–11	T-6th	0–1 Quarter-Finals	

==== Women's ====
The women's team kicked off intercollegiate athletics at St. Francis College in 1973. Since the 1988–89 season the women's basketball team was a part of the Northeast Conference. The Terriers coach with the most wins was John Thurston who from 2012 to 2018 accumulated a 73–110 record. Thurston also was the first coach in program history to win a Northeast Conference tournament Championship and participate in an NCAA tournament. Also under Thurston, the 2013–14 squad set the single-season program record with 19 victories. In 2018, Linda Cimino was announced as the head coach. Previously, Cimino was the head coach at Binghamton. In Cimino's first year at the helm, she set the Terrier record for conference wins in a season, 12.

Women's basketball yearly record
Year	Head coach	Overall record (W–L)	NEC record	Standing	NEC Tournament record	Postseason Tournament record
2012–13	John Thurston	11–19	8–10	7th	0–1 Quarter-Finals	
2013–14	John Thurston	19–11	10–8	5th	0–1 Quarter-Finals	
2014–15	John Thurston	15–19	9–9	5th	3–0 Champions	NCAA first round 0–1
2015–16	John Thurston	7–22	4–14	9th	DNQ	
2016–17	John Thurston	8–22	6–12	T-7th	0–1 Quarter-Finals	
2017–18	John Thurston	13–17	9–9	T-3rd	0–1 Quarter-Finals	
2018–19	Linda Cimino	18–13	12–6	3rd	0–1 Quarter-Finals	
2019–20	Linda Cimino	8–21	4–14	10th	DNQ	

=== Baseball ===
St. Francis won the very first Northeast Conference tournament in 1993. They never reached the NCAA Tournament. They discontinued the program in 2006.

=== Water polo ===
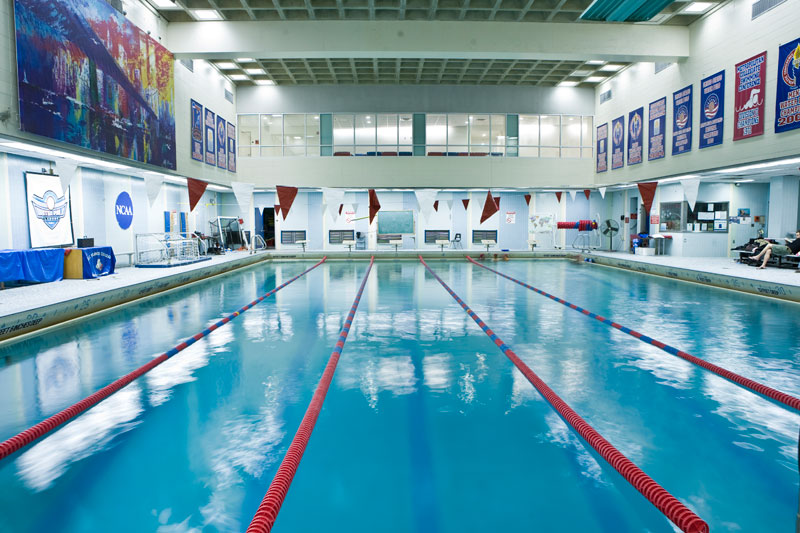
St. Francis Aquatics Center

Both the men's and women's water polo teams played at the St. Francis College Aquatics Center, located at the college in Brooklyn Heights. The men's team competed in the CWPA and ECAC and the women's team in the MAAC, both participated in Division I leagues.

==== Men's ====
The St. Francis College Men's Water Polo club began its program in 1952. In the 1970s, St. Francis helped to form the association of East Coast schools that eventually became the Collegiate Water Polo Association. The Terriers have enjoyed much success and are one of the better teams on the east coast. In consecutive years from 2004 to 2008, they've won the ECAC Championships and the CWPA Northern Division Championships. The Terriers have finished between first and fourth in the Eastern Championships from 1999 to 2007. In 2005 they finished first and qualified for the NCAA National Championships and finished fourth at the Final Four.

The team was headed by coach Carl Quigley, whom in 1999 was the coach of the year for the CWPA Northern Division. Coach Quigley headed the Terriers for 34 years, 1974–2008, and for many years had compiled a successful and diverse team, composed of Americans, Serbians, Hungarians and Israelis. From 2005 to 2008 under coach Quigley, the Terriers had a combined 82–25 record with four ECAC Championships, four CWPA Northern Division Championships, 1 NCAA Final Four berth and have been ranked as high as 11th nationally by the NCAA.

From 2009 to 2012, Igor Samardzija was the head coach; he finished his inaugural season at 12–6. At the end of the 2009 season, the Terriers were ranked in the NCAA Top 20 of the nation at #18. In 2010, the Terriers, under Igor Samardzija, finished the season having been ranked as high as No. 10 in the nation and made their second trip to the NCAA Final Four, finishing in fourth place. Also in 2010, the Terriers won the ECAC Championships, the Northern Division Championship tournament and the CWPA Eastern Championship. In the 2011 season, the Terriers won the CWPA Northern Division Championships, finished third in the Eastern Championships and ended the season ranked at 16th in the nation. For the third time in the programs history, the 2012 Terriers won the Eastern Championships and earned an NCAA final four birth. The Terriers also went on to defeat Air Force to win their first national tournament match for a third-place finish.

From 2013 to 2014, Srdjan Mihaljevic an alumnus of St. Francis College and former water polo player was the head coach. Mihaljevic inherited a team that placed third in the 2012 NCAA Final Four and was ranked tenth in preseason polls. In 2013, the Terriers went on to a 23–12 record and won the Northern Division and Eastern Championships, in the process qualifying for an NCAA National Championship berth. In winning back-to-back Eastern Championships, St. Francis joins Yale University (1972–74), Bucknell (1977–80), Brown (1983–85), the United States Naval Academy (1986–88, 2006–08) and the University of Massachusetts (1993–96, 1998–99) as the only programs in league history to claim back-to-back crowns. The championship marks the first in the career of first-year head coach Srdjan Mihaljevic as the former SFC assistant coach claimed the Dick Russell Coach of the Tournament award for guiding the Terriers to the program's fourth championship in eight appearances in the Championship Game. The Terriers defeated UC San Diego in the NCAA Men's Water Polo Championship play-in game. The Terriers then lost in the semi-finals to top seeded USC and in the consolation game to Stanford, to finish fourth in the NCAA tournament. During the 2014 season, the Terriers under-performed and finished at 16–13. After the season head coach Srdjan Mihaljevic announced that he was resigning.

Former Olympian Igor Zagoruiko was named Head Coach for the 2015 season. At the beginning of the 2016 season, the Terriers were ranked at 20th in the CWPA's preseason poll. Under Zagoruiko, the Terriers were a mediocre 28–26 and did not win any postseason tournaments. For the 2017 season, the Terriers hired, alumnus Bora Dimitrov, the youngest head coach in NCAA varsity men's water polo at the time of his hiring.

St. Francis College Terriers Statistics
Year	Coach	Record	ECAC Championships	CWPA Northern Division Championships	Eastern Championships	NCAA National Championships	End of Year National Rank
1998	Carl Quigley		2nd place	–	–	DNQ	
1999	Carl Quigley		2nd place	2nd place	2nd place	DNQ	
2000	Carl Quigley		1st place	1st place	3rd place	DNQ	
2001	Carl Quigley		3rd place	3rd place	5th place	DNQ	
2002	Carl Quigley		6th place	3rd place	4th place	DNQ	
2003	Carl Quigley		4th place	3rd place	4th place	DNQ	
2004	Carl Quigley		1st place	1st place	3rd place	DNQ	
2005	Carl Quigley	20–8	1st place	1st place	1st place	4th place (0–2)	
2006	Carl Quigley	22–5	1st place	1st place	4th place	DNQ	
2007	Carl Quigley	20–6	1st place	1st place	3rd place	DNQ	12th
2008	Carl Quigley	20–6	1st place	1st place	3rd place	DNQ	14th
2009	Igor Samardzija	12–6 (0–0)	–	–	–	DNQ	18th
2010	Igor Samardzija	23–5 (16–3)	1st place	1st place	1st place	4th place (0–2)	10th
2011	Igor Samardzija	15–9 (5–0)	–	1st place	3rd place	DNQ	16th
2012	Igor Samardzija	17–9 (4–2)	–	1st place	1st place	3rd place (1–1)	9th
2013	Srdjan Mihaljevic	23–12 (9–2)	–	1st place	1st place	4th place (0–2)	10th
2014	Srdjan Mihaljevic	16–13 (10–2)	–	2nd place			
2015	Igor Zagoruiko	17–13 (8–4)	–	3rd place			
2016	Igor Zagoruiko	13–14 (5–5)	–				
2017	Bora Dimitrov	10–5 (8–3)	–				
2018	Bora Dimitrov	9–15 (7–3)	–				
2019	Bora Dimitrov	19–14 (5–5)	–	4th place			
2020	Bora Dimitrov	0–0 (0–0)	–				

=== Soccer ===
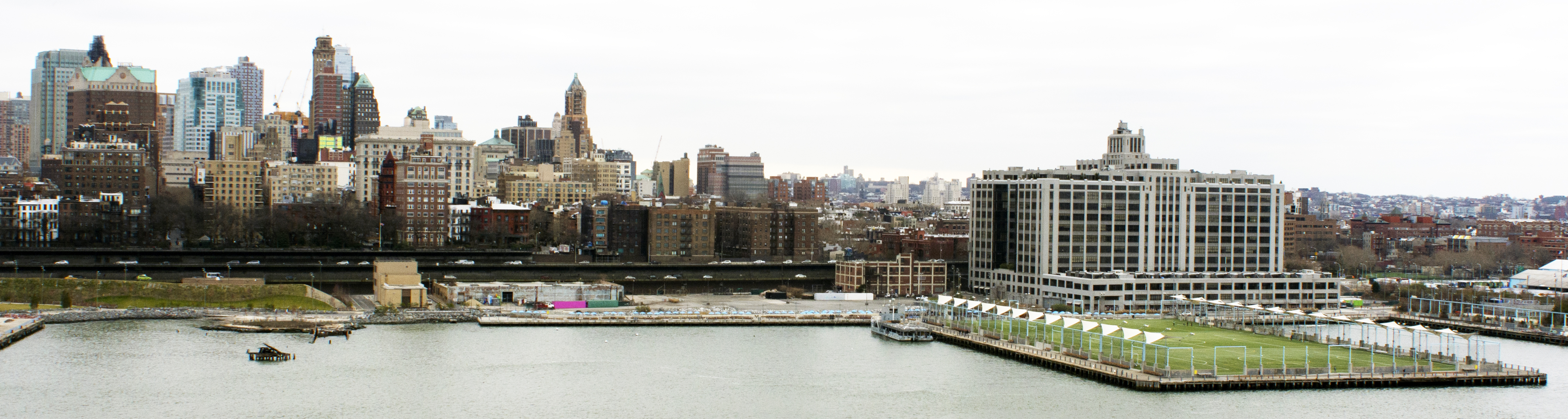
View of Brooklyn Bridge Park Pier 5, home of the Terriers, from the East River. The field is located on the lower right portion of the image.

Both the Men's and Women's soccer teams played their home matches at Brooklyn Bridge Park Pier 5, located on the East River in Brooklyn Heights, Brooklyn.

==== Men's ====
The St. Francis College Men's Soccer team had an overall record of 455–365–88 spanning from 1968 to 2019. In that time, the Terriers have made nine NCAA tournament appearances and have won five NEC regular season championships and eight NEC Tournament championships. Since joining the NEC in 1985, the team has posted a 137–117–26 record against conference teams and leads the conference with the most tournament championships.

The final head coach, Tom Giovatto, joined the Terriers in 2007 and led the team to a 120–85–32 record. In 2009, Giovatto secured a NEC Tournament berth with the second seed and in 2013 he won the NEC Championship with the fourth seed. With the 2013 NEC Tournament championship the Terriers received an automatic NCAA tournament bid, where they lost in the first round. In 2014, the Terriers repeated as NEC Tournament champions and participated in the NCAA tournament again losing in the first round. In 2016, Giovatto won NEC Coach of the Year, after leading his team to an NEC Regular season Championship, he then proceeded to win the 2016 NEC tournament and participate in the NCAA Division I Men's Soccer Championship. In 2017, Giovatto repeated the feat of winning Coach of the Year, the NEC Regular season championship and the NEC Tournament championship.

Men's soccer yearly record
Year	Coach	Overall record	%	NEC Record	Points	Finish	Postseason
2007	T. Giovatto	4–9–5	36.1%	2–5–2	8	8th	DNQ
2008	T. Giovatto	11–4–3	69.4%	4–3–2	14	5th	DNQ
2009	T. Giovatto	10–6–2	61.1%	7–2–1	22	2nd	NEC Semi-finals
2010	T. Giovatto	5–9–3	38%	3–6–1	10	T-8th	DNQ
2011	T. Giovatto	10–5–3	63.9%	5–3–2	17	6th	DNQ
2012	T. Giovatto	7–10–1	41.7%	4–6–0	12	8th	DNQ
2013	T. Giovatto	12–6–1	65.8%	4–3–0	12	4th	NEC Champions; NCAA first round
2014	T. Giovatto	11–6–4	61.9%	4–1–2	14	3rd	NEC Champions; NCAA first round
2015	T. Giovatto	10–3–4	70.6%	3–2–2	11	4th	NEC Semi-finals
2016	T. Giovatto	12–5–3	67.5%	6–0–1	19	1st	NEC Champions; NCAA first round
2017	T. Giovatto	14–5–1	72.5%	6–0–1	19	1st	NEC Champions; NCAA first round
2018	T. Giovatto	7–10–0	41.2%	4–4–0	12	T-5th	DNQ
2019	T. Giovatto	7–6–2	53.3%	3–5–1	10	T-6th	DNQ

==== Women's ====
Women's Soccer at St. Francis College was founded in 2019. The programs only head coach was Justine Lombardi. In their inaugural season, the Terriers did not win a game and posted a 0–17–0 record.

Women's soccer yearly record
Year	Coach	Overall record	%	NEC Record	Points	Finish	Postseason
2019	Justine Lombardi	0–17–0	0%	0–10–0	0	11th	DNQ
2020	Justine Lombardi	0–0–0	0%	0–0–0	0		DNQ

== Rocky the Terrier ==
The mascot of St. Francis Brooklyn was Rocky the Terrier. The mascot was officially adopted in 1933 by the college's athletic association.

== Notable alumni ==
- Vincent Bezecourt '16, signed with the New York Red Bulls of the Major League Soccer.
- Kasey Koslowski '01, three time all conference player and signed as a free agent by the Chicago White Sox
- Jessica Zinobile '00, 62nd overall pick by the Sacramento Monarchs
- John Mangieri '97, Pitcher drafted by the New York Mets, member of the Italian World Baseball Classic Team
- John Halama '94, Major League Baseball Pitcher
- Scott Pagano '92, Outfielder drafted by the Detroit Tigers in the 16th round
- Donald Peters '90, 26th overall pick by the Oakland A's
- Bernie Jenkins '88, Outfielder drafted by the Houston Astros in the 7th round
- James Desapio '88, Pitcher drafted by the Houston Astros in the 23rd round
- Luis Mallea '87, Pitcher drafted by the Kansas City Royals in the 25th round
- Richard Simon '86, Pitcher drafted by the Houston Astros in the 6th round
- Dragan Radovich '78, 3 time first team all-American goalkeeper and professional soccer player
- Nestor Cora '78, 165th overall pick by the Washington Bullets
- Dennis McDermott '74, 140th overall pick by the New York Knicks
- Louis Anemone '71, 675th pick by the Minnesota Twins
- Peter Scarpati '69, 910th overall pick by the Los Angeles Dodgers
- Gil Radday '67, 84th overall pick by the New York Knicks
- Paul DeLoca '65, RHP selected in the 60th round by the St. Louis Cardinals
- Alvin B. Inniss '58, 40th overall pick by the Minneapolis Lakers
- Walter Acamushko '57, 42nd overall pick by the Detroit Pistons
- Dan Mannix, '56 selected by the Rochester Royals in the 1956 draft
- Henry Daubenschmidt '54, 23rd overall pick by the Boston Celtics
- Vernon Stokes '53, selected in the 6th round by the Boston Celtics
- Jim Luisi, '51, 56th overall pick by the Boston Celtics
- Roy Reardon '51, 75th overall pick by the Syracuse Nationals
- Tom Gallagher '49, selected by the Baltimore Bullets in the 1949 draft
