= 2012–13 St. Francis Brooklyn Terriers women's basketball team =

Intercollegiate basketball season

2012–13 St. Francis Brooklyn Terriers women's basketball
- Conference: Northeast Conference
- Record: 11–19 (8–10 NEC)
- Head coach: John Thurston (1st season)
- Assistant coaches: Dionne Dodson (5th season); Nettie Respondek (1st season); Kaitlyn Vican (2nd season)
- Home arena: Generoso Pope Athletic Complex

2012–13 Northeast Conference women's basketball standings
	Conf.				Overall
Team	W		L	PCT	W		L	PCT
Quinnipiac†	18	–	0	1.000	30	–	3	.909
Sacred Heart	13	–	5	.722	22	–	11	.667
Monmouth	12	–	6	.667	15	–	15	.500
Central Connecticut	10	–	8	.556	16	–	14	.533
Saint Francis (PA)	10	–	8	.556	17	–	16	.515
Mount St. Mary's	10	–	8	.556	15	–	16	.484
Bryant	8	–	10	.444	12	–	18	.400
St. Francis Brooklyn	8	–	10	.444	11	–	19	.367
Fairleigh Dickinson	7	–	11	.389	12	–	17	.414
Robert Morris†	6	–	12	.333	7	–	22	.241
LIU Brooklyn	4	–	14	.222	7	–	22	.241
Wagner	2	–	16	.111	3	–	26	.103
† 2013 NEC tournament winner As of 10:03, 1 April 2014 (UTC); Rankings from AP poll

The 2012–13 St. Francis Brooklyn Terriers women's basketball team represented St. Francis College during the 2012–13 NCAA Division I women's basketball season. The Terrier's home games were played at the Generoso Pope Athletic Complex. The team has been a member of the Northeast Conference since 1988. St. Francis Brooklyn was coached by John Thurston, who was in his first year at the helm of the Terriers.

== Roster ==
2012–13 St. Francis Brooklyn Terriers women's basketball team
Players
Coaches

Pos.	#	Name	Height	Year	Hometown
G	11	Stefanie Bingham	5 ft 8 in (1.73 m)	Sr	Willingboro, New Jersey
G	1	Jasmin Robinson	5 ft 4 in (1.63 m)	Jr	Brooklyn, New York
G	25	Ozana Marginean	5 ft 7 in (1.7 m)	Jr	Arad, Romania
C	31	Kiley Grabbe	6 ft 2 in (1.88 m)	Jr	Mullica Hill, New Jersey
G	41	Eilidh Simpson	5 ft 7 in (1.7 m)	So	Melbourne, Australia
F	30	Kelly Myers	6 ft 0 in (1.83 m)	So	Coventry, Connecticut
F	50	Colette Hounshell	6 ft 1 in (1.85 m)	So	Kirtland, Ohio
G	21	Katie Fox	5 ft 5 in (1.65 m)	So	Twinsburg, Ohio
F	34	Jaymee Veney	6 ft 0 in (1.83 m)	So	Fairborn, Ohio
F	14	Sarah Benedetti	5 ft 10 in (1.78 m)	So	Canton, Connecticut
F	44	Jessica Kaufman	5 ft 11 in (1.8 m)	So	Melbourne, Australia
G	12	Leah Fechko	5 ft 8 in (1.73 m)	Fr	Twinsburg, Ohio
G	3	Taylor Watson	5 ft 8 in (1.73 m)	Fr	Southampton, New Jersey
F	45	Casey Cummings	6 ft 1 in (1.85 m)	Fr	Leesburg, Virginia

Head coach

- John Thurston (Seton Hall '70)

Assistant coach(es)

- Dionne Dodson (Muskingum '97)
- Nettie Respondek (Vanderbilt '98)
- Kaitlyn Vican (Fordham '11)

Legend

- (C) Team captain
- (S) Suspended
- (I) Ineligible
- (W) Walk-on
- Injured
- Current redshirt

Roster
Last update: November 9, 2015

== Schedule ==
Date time, TV	Rank^{#}	Opponent^{#}	Result	Record	Site (attendance) city, state
Non-conference regular season
November 12, 2012*; 7:00 pm		at Army	W 59–47	1–0	Christl Arena (348); West Point, NY
November 16, 2012*; 7:00 pm		Delaware State	W 69–50	2–0	Generoso Pope Athletic Complex (187); Brooklyn, NY
November 20, 2012*; 7:00 pm		at NJIT	L 61–73	2–1	Fleisher Center (188); Newark, NJ
November 28, 2012*; 7:00 pm		Cornell	L 56–74	2–2	Generoso Pope Athletic Complex (107); Brooklyn, NY
December 1, 2012*; 2:00 pm		at Fairfield	L 43–52	2–3	Alumni Hall (317); Fairfield, CT
December 5, 2012*; 7:00 pm		Penn	L 60–61	2–4	Generoso Pope Athletic Complex (167); Brooklyn, NY
December 8, 2012*; 2:00 pm		Yale	L 62–66 ^{OT}	2–5	Generoso Pope Athletic Complex (183); Brooklyn, NY
December 11, 2012*; 7:00 pm		at Columbia	L 45–89	2–6	Levien Gymnasium (200); New York, NY
December 19, 2012*; 7:00 pm		at Stony Brook	L 52–65	2–7	Pritchard Gymnasium (106); Stony Brook, NY
December 21, 2012*; 7:00 pm		at Lafayette	L 63–66	2–8	Kirby Sports Center (423); Easton, PA
December 29, 2012*; 2:00 pm		at Rider	W 58–55	3–8	Alumni Gymnasium (209); Lawrenceville, NJ
Northeast Conference Regular Season
January 5, 2013; 1:00 pm		at Sacred Heart	W 56–47	4–8 (1–0)	William H. Pitt Center (439); Fairfield, CT
January 7, 2013; 7:00 pm		at Quinnipiac	L 52–73	4–9 (1–1)	TD Bank Sports Center (251); Hamden, CT
January 12, 2013; 1:00 pm		at Wagner	W 72–66	5–9 (2–1)	Spiro Sports Center (421); Staten Island, NY
January 14, 2013; 7:00 pm		Mount St. Mary's	L 45–49	5–10 (2–2)	Generoso Pope Athletic Complex (135); Brooklyn, NY
January 19, 2013; 2:00 pm		Fairleigh Dickinson	W 64–56	6–10 (3–2)	Generoso Pope Athletic Complex (355); Brooklyn, NY
January 21, 2013; 2:00 pm		Monmouth	L 64–68	6–11 (3–3)	Generoso Pope Athletic Complex (152); Brooklyn, NY
January 26, 2013; 1:00 pm		at Central Connecticut	L 29–55	6–12 (3–4)	William H. Detrick Gymnasium; New Britain, CT
January 28, 2013; 7:00 pm		at LIU Brooklyn; Battle of Brooklyn	W 69–58	7–12 (4–4)	Steinberg Wellness Center (385); Brooklyn, NY
February 2, 2013; 2:00 pm		Saint Francis (PA)	L 53–64	7–13 (4–5)	Generoso Pope Athletic Complex (269); Brooklyn, NY
February 4, 2013; 7:00 pm		Robert Morris	W 67–63 ^{2OT}	8–13 (5–5)	Generoso Pope Athletic Complex (100); Brooklyn, NY
February 9, 2013; 2:00 pm		LIU Brooklyn	W 70–62	9–13 (6–5)	Generoso Pope Athletic Complex (113); Brooklyn, NY
February 12, 2013; 7:00 pm		at Bryant	W 68–57	10–13 (7–5)	Chace Athletic Center (157); Smithfield, RI
February 16, 2013; 3:00 pm		at Monmouth	L 47–51	10–14 (7–6)	Multipurpose Activity Center (531); West Long Branch, NJ
February 18, 2013; 7:00 pm		at Fairleigh Dickinson	W 56–50	11–14 (8–6)	Rothman Center (89); Hackensack, NJ
February 23, 2013; 7:00 pm		at Mount St. Mary's	L 48–49	11–15 (8–7)	Knott Arena (295); Emmitsburg, MD
February 25, 2013; 7:00 pm		Wagner	L 48–52	11–16 (8–8)	Generoso Pope Athletic Complex (100); Brooklyn, NY
March 2, 2013; 2:00 pm		Sacred Heart	L 53–57	11–17 (8–9)	Generoso Pope Athletic Complex (120); Brooklyn, NY
March 4, 2013; 7:00 pm		Quinnipiac	L 54–73	11–18 (8–10)	Generoso Pope Athletic Complex (100); Brooklyn, NY
Northeast Conference tournament
March 10, 2013; 2:00 pm		at Sacred Heart; Quarterfinals	L 38–64	11–19	William H. Pitt Center (432); Fairfield, CT
*Non-conference game. ^{#}Rankings from AP Poll,. (#) Tournament seedings in parentheses. All times are in Eastern Time..

== See also ==
- 2012–13 St. Francis Brooklyn Terriers men's basketball team
