= 2013–14 St. Francis Brooklyn Terriers women's basketball team =

Intercollegiate basketball season

2013–14 St. Francis Brooklyn Terriers women's basketball
- Conference: Northeast Conference
- Record: 19–11 (10–8 NEC)
- Head coach: John Thurston (2nd season)
- Assistant coaches: Dionne Dodson (6th season); Nettie Respondek (2nd season); Kaitlyn Vican (3rd season)
- Home arena: Generoso Pope Athletic Complex

2013–14 Northeast Conference women's basketball standings
	Conf.				Overall
Team	W		L	PCT	W		L	PCT
Robert Morris†	14	–	4	.778	21	–	12	.636
Mount St. Mary's	13	–	5	.722	19	–	14	.576
Saint Francis (PA)	11	–	7	.611	15	–	17	.469
Bryant	11	–	7	.611	17	–	15	.531
St. Francis Brooklyn	10	–	8	.556	19	–	11	.633
Sacred Heart	9	–	9	.500	12	–	18	.400
Wagner	8	–	10	.444	9	–	21	.300
LIU Brooklyn	7	–	11	.389	9	–	21	.300
Central Connecticut	5	–	13	.278	11	–	17	.393
Fairleigh Dickinson	2	–	16	.111	3	–	26	.103
† 2014 NEC tournament winner As of 10:03, 1 April 2014 (UTC); Rankings from AP poll

The 2013–14 St. Francis Brooklyn Terriers women's basketball team represented St. Francis College during the 2013–14 NCAA Division I women's basketball season. The Terrier's home games were played at the Generoso Pope Athletic Complex. The team has been a member of the Northeast Conference since 1988. St. Francis Brooklyn was coached by John Thurston, who was in his second year at the helm of the Terriers.

For the 2013–14 season the Terriers made a pair of appearances on ESPN3 for the first time in their history. The 2013–14 Terriers improved to 6–2 on the season for the first time since the 1976–77 season. After going 11–2 by winning 5 straight games, the Terriers for the first time in program history were ranked inside the top 25 of a national basketball poll at 25th in the CollegeInsider.com Top 25 Mid-Major Poll. The 2013–14 squad set the single-season school record with 19 wins during the year. The Terriers also notched 10 conference wins, the most in St. Francis Brooklyn women's basketball history to date (the record was broken by the 2018–19 squad, 12 wins).

== Roster ==
2013–14 St. Francis Brooklyn Terriers women's basketball team
Players
Coaches

Pos.	#	Name	Height	Year	Hometown
G	1	Jasmin Robinson	5 ft 4 in (1.63 m)	Sr	Brooklyn, New York
G	25	Ozana Marginean	5 ft 7 in (1.7 m)	Sr	Arad, Romania
C	31	Kiley Grabbe	6 ft 2 in (1.88 m)	Sr	Mullica Hill, New Jersey
G	41	Eilidh Simpson	5 ft 7 in (1.7 m)	Jr	Melbourne, Australia
F	50	Colette Hounshell	6 ft 1 in (1.85 m)	Jr	Kirtland, Ohio
G	21	Katie Fox	5 ft 5 in (1.65 m)	Jr	Twinsburg, Ohio
F	34	Jaymee Veney	6 ft 0 in (1.83 m)	Jr	Fairborn, Ohio
F	14	Sarah Benedetti	5 ft 10 in (1.78 m)	Jr	Canton, Connecticut
F	44	Jessica Kaufman	5 ft 11 in (1.8 m)	Jr	Melbourne, Australia
G	12	Leah Fechko	5 ft 8 in (1.73 m)	So	Twinsburg, Ohio
G	3	Taylor Watson	5 ft 8 in (1.73 m)	So	Southampton, New Jersey
F	45	Casey Cummings	6 ft 1 in (1.85 m)	So	Leesburg, Virginia
G	23	Rachel Iozzia (redshirt)	5 ft 10 in (1.78 m)	Fr	Bayville, New Jersey
F	35	Olivia Levey	6 ft 0 in (1.83 m)	Fr	Seymour, Connecticut

Head coach

- John Thurston (Seton Hall '70)

Assistant coach(es)

- Dionne Dodson (Muskingum '97)
- Nettie Respondek (Vanderbilt '98)
- Kaitlyn Vican (Fordham '11)

Legend

- (C) Team captain
- (S) Suspended
- (I) Ineligible
- (W) Walk-on
- Injured
- Current redshirt

Roster

== Schedule ==
Date time, TV	Rank^{#}	Opponent^{#}	Result	Record	Site (attendance) city, state
Non-conference regular season
November 9, 2013*; 2:00 pm		at Pennsylvania	W 56–51	1–0	Tha Palestra (908); Philadelphia, PA
November 11, 2013*; 7:00 pm		Army	W 56–53	2–0	Generoso Pope Athletic Complex (202); Brooklyn, NY
November 16, 2013*; 2:00 pm, ESPN3		at St. John's	L 56–66	2–1	Carnesecca Arena (845); Queens, NY
November 25, 2013*; 7:00 pm		UMass Lowell	W 77–59	3–1	Generoso Pope Athletic Complex (226); Brooklyn, NY
November 26, 2013*; 7:00 pm		NJIT	W 58–53	4–1	Generoso Pope Athletic Complex (115); Brooklyn, NY
November 29, 2013*; 1:00 pm		at Miami (FL); University of Miami Tournament	L 57–78	4–2	BankUnited Center (620); Coral Gables, FL
November 30, 2013*; 1:00 pm		vs. Hartford; University of Miami Tournament	W 56–49	5–2	BankUnited Center; Coral Gables, FL
December 4, 2013*; 7:00 pm		Columbia	W 73–47	6–2	Generoso Pope Athletic Complex (165); Brooklyn, NY
December 7, 2013*; 1:00 pm		at Cornell	W 78–68	7–2	Newman Arena (493); Ithaca, NY
December 20, 2013*; 7:00 pm		Lafayette	W 74–52	8–2	Generoso Pope Athletic Complex (195); Brooklyn, NY
December 29, 2013*; 2:00 pm		at Delaware State	W 68–55	9–2	Memorial Hall (112); Dover, DE
Northeast Conference Regular Season
January 4, 2014; 2:00 pm		Mount St. Mary's	W 52–47	10–2 (1–0)	Generoso Pope Athletic Complex (95); Brooklyn, NY
January 6, 2014; 7:00 pm		at Fairleigh Dickinson	W 57–55	11–2 (2–0)	Rothman Center (112); Hackensack, NJ
January 11, 2014; 12:00 pm, ESPN3		at LIU Brooklyn	W 69–48	12–2 (3–0)	Barclays Center (922); Brooklyn, NY
January 13, 2014; 7:00 pm		at Mount St. Mary's	L 79–85	12–3 (3–1)	Knott Arena (221); Emmitsburg, MD
January 18, 2014; 2:00 pm		Sacred Heart	W 69–49	13–3 (4–1)	Generoso Pope Athletic Complex (326); Brooklyn, NY
January 20, 2014; 5:00 pm		at Bryant	L 58–61	13–4 (4–2)	Chace Athletic Center (629); Smithfield, RI
January 25, 2014; 1:00 pm		at Central Connecticut	L 63–71 ^{OT}	13–5 (4–3)	William H. Detrick Gymnasium (403); New Britain, CT
January 27, 2014; 7:00 pm		Wagner	L 62–73	13–6 (4–4)	Generoso Pope Athletic Complex (135); Brooklyn, NY
February 1, 2014; 2:00 pm		Central Connecticut	W 71–50	14–6 (5–4)	Generoso Pope Athletic Complex (111); Brooklyn, NY
February 4, 2014; 7:00 pm		Fairleigh Dickinson	W 67–51	15–6 (6–4)	Generoso Pope Athletic Complex (85); Brooklyn, NY
February 8, 2014; 4:00 pm		at Robert Morris	L 95–101 ^{2OT}	15–7 (6–5)	Charles L. Sewall Center (292); Moon Township, PA
February 10, 2014; 7:00 pm		at Saint Francis (PA)	W 90–76	16–7 (7–5)	DeGol Arena (712); Loretto, PA
February 15, 2014; 1:00 pm		Wagner	L 53–62	16–8 (7–6)	Spiro Sports Center (543); Staten Island, NY
February 17, 2014; 7:00 pm		Sacred Heart	L 53–77	16–9 (7–7)	William H. Pitt Center (280); Fairfield, CT
February 22, 2014; 2:00 pm		Saint Francis (PA)	W 82–74	17–9 (8–7)	Generoso Pope Athletic Complex (138); Brooklyn, NY
February 24, 2014; 7:00 pm		Robert Morris	W 93–82	18–9 (9–7)	Generoso Pope Athletic Complex (200); Brooklyn, NY
March 1, 2014; 2:00 pm		Bryant	L 58–63	18–10 (9–8)	Generoso Pope Athletic Complex (375); Brooklyn, NY
March 3, 2014; 7:00 pm		LIU Brooklyn; Battle of Brooklyn	W 66–50	19–10 (10–8)	Generoso Pope Athletic Complex (300); Brooklyn, NY
Northeast Conference tournament
March 9, 2014; 6:00 pm		at Bryant; Quarterfinals	L 53–58	19–11	Chace Athletic Center; Smithfield, RI
*Non-conference game. ^{#}Rankings from AP Poll,. (#) Tournament seedings in parentheses. All times are in Eastern Time..

== See also ==
- 2013–14 St. Francis Brooklyn Terriers men's basketball team
