= St. Francis Brooklyn Terriers women's basketball =

St. Francis Brooklyn Terriers
- University: St. Francis College
- Location: Brooklyn, New York
- Arena: The ARC, Pratt Institute
- Nickname: Terriers
- Colors: Royal blue and red
- All-time record: 384–872 (.290)

NCAA Division I tournament appearances
- 2015

Conference tournament champions
- 2015

Uniforms
Home	Away	Alternate

The St. Francis Brooklyn Terriers women's basketball program represented St. Francis College (SFC) in intercollegiate women's basketball. The team was a member of the Division I Northeast Conference from 1988 until 2023. The Terriers played at the Activity Resource Center at Pratt Institute (aka "The ARC") in the Clinton Hill neighborhood of Brooklyn, New York. Through the start of the 2022–23 season, the team had played at the Peter Aquilone Court at the Generoso Pope Athletic Complex on SFC's former campus in Brooklyn Heights. At the end of the 2021–22 school year, SFC moved to a new campus on Livingston Street in Downtown Brooklyn that has no athletic facilities; SFC arranged to use The ARC on at least a temporary basis. On March 20, 2023, St. Francis Brooklyn announced the discontinuation of all intercollegiate sports, meaning the 2022–23 season was the final season for the Terriers.

== History ==
The women's team kicked off intercollegiate athletics at St. Francis College in 1973. The first head coach was Christine McGowan, who led them to a 9–5 record. Since the 1988–89 season the women's basketball team has been a part of the Northeast Conference. The programs first Conference tournament Championship and NCAA Tournament participation occurred in 2015 when both were accomplished.

=== John Thurston era ===
From 2012 until 2018, John Thurston was the head coach of the St. Francis College Terriers. After the 2017–18 season Thurston retired. While at the helm of the Terriers, Thurston accumulated a 73–110 record, the highest win total of any coach in program history. Thurston also was the first coach in program history to win a Northeast Conference tournament Championship and participate in an NCAA tournament. Also under Thurston, the 2013–14 squad set the single-season program record with 19 victories.

In 2012, Thurston replaced Brenda Milano, who coached the Terriers for 9 seasons leading them to the NEC playoffs only 3 times. After not making the NEC Tournament for four consecutive seasons, from 2008 to 2011, first-year head coach Thurston was able to secure the 7th seed in 2012. The Terriers also won more than 10 games for the first time in 5 years that season and had an overall record of 11–19. For the 2013–14 season the Terriers made a pair of appearances on ESPN3 for the first time in their history. The 2013–14 Terriers improved to 6–2 on the season for the first time since the 1976–77 season. After going 11–2 by winning 5 straight games, the Terriers for the first time in program history were ranked inside the top 25 of a national basketball poll at 25th in the CollegeInsider.com Top 25 Mid-Major Poll. The 2013–14 squad set the single-season school record with 19 wins during the year. The Terriers also notched 10 conference wins, which was the most in St. Francis Brooklyn women's basketball history to that point.

The 2014–15 team was invited to participate in the 2014 Preseason WNIT, the first in the program's history. They also won the 2014–15 Northeast Conference Women's Basketball Championship after defeating Robert Morris on the road. St. Francis Brooklyn is the first team in the conference to go on the road and win all three tournament games to be crowned Northeast Conference Champions. They are also the first number 5 seed to take home the championship trophy. This was the first championship for St. Francis women's basketball in program history. The women's basketball team also made its first NCAA tournament appearance and lost to eventual champions Connecticut.

During the 2015–16 season the Terriers excelled in the classroom and posted the number one ranking in the NCAA for team GPA. Additionally, the Terriers for four consecutive years have won Northeast Conference Top Academic Team Awards, four consecutive Northeast Conference Sportsmanship Awards, and four consecutive years finishing among the top five teams in the Women's Basketball Coaches Association Team GPA rankings.

=== Linda Cimino era ===
Cimino was formally announced as the head coach of the Terriers on May 21, 2018. She became the 13th head coach in program history. Previously, Cimino was the head coach at Binghamton. In Cimino's first year at the helm, she set the Terrier record for conference wins in a season, 12, which was previously held by John Thurston's 2013–14 squad that won 10.

At the conclusion of the 2022–23 season, St. Francis Brooklyn announced the discontinuation of all intercollegiate sports effective at the end of the Spring Semester 2023. This makes the 2022–23 Terriers team the last team to represent St. Francis Brooklyn in women's basketball at the Division One level.

== Season-by-season results ==
St. Francis Brooklyn Terriers
Season	Head coach	Conference	Season results			Post-Season Tournament results	
Season	Head coach	Conference	Overall	Conference	Standing	Conference	NCAA
1973–74	Christine McGowan	Independents	9–5				
1974–75	Dianne Nolan	Independents	6–11				
1975–76	Dianne Nolan	Independents	16–10				
1976–77	Dianne Nolan	Independents	14–10				
1977–78	Dianne Nolan	Independents	14–13				
1978–79	Dianne Nolan	Independents	11–13				
1979–80	Mary Convy	Independents	9–15				
1980–81	Mary Convy	Independents	9–20				
1981–82	Mary Convy	Independents	7–16				
1982–83	John Woods	Independents	5–22				
1983–84	Dominick Vulpis	Independents	5–20				
1984–85	Dominick Vulpis	Independents	13–13				
1985–86	Dominick Vulpis	Independents	9–16				
1986–87	Kevin A. Jones	NEC	14–15	9–7	5th	Semifinal (1–1)	
1987–88	Cecil King	NEC	4–22	2–14		DNQ	
1988–89	Irma Garcia	NEC	3–24	1–15		DNQ	
1989–90	Irma Garcia	NEC	6–20	2–14		DNQ	
1990–91	Irma Garcia	NEC	5–22	2–14		DNQ	
1991–92	Irma Garcia	NEC	1–26	0–16		DNQ	
1992–93	Irma Garcia	NEC	3–23	0–18	10th	DNQ	
1993–94	Irma Garcia	NEC	9–19	5–13	8th	Semifinal (1–1)	
1994–95	Irma Garcia	NEC	12–16	6–12	8th	Semifinal (1–1)	
1995–96	Irma Garcia	NEC	3–23	2–15	10th	DNQ	
1996–97	Irma Garcia	NEC	5–22	2–16	10th	DNQ	
1997–98	Irma Garcia	NEC	11–16	7–9	5th	Quarterfinal (0–1)	
1998–99	Irma Garcia	NEC	10–17	9–11	T-6th	Quarterfinal (0–1)	
1999–2000	Steve Fagan	NEC	2–25	1–17	12th	DNQ	
2000–01	Christine Cunningham	NEC	2–25	2–16	11th	DNQ	
2001–02	Christine Cunningham	NEC	5–22	3–15	T-11th	DNQ	
2002–03	Christine Cunningham	NEC	2–25	1–17	T-11th	DNQ	
2003–04	Brenda Milano	NEC	8–19	7–11	9th	DNQ	
2004–05	Brenda Milano	NEC	10–18	7–11	8th	Quarterfinal (0–1)	
2005–06	Brenda Milano	NEC	5–22	4–14	T-9th	DNQ	
2006–07	Brenda Milano	NEC	13–18	7–11	8th	Semifinal (1–1)	
2007–08	Brenda Milano	NEC	10–20	7–11	T-6th	Quarterfinal (0–1)	
2008–09	Brenda Milano	NEC	4–25	3–15	T-10th	DNQ	
2009–10	Brenda Milano	NEC	2–27	1–17	12th	DNQ	
2010–11	Brenda Milano	NEC	2–27	0–18	12th	DNQ	
2011–12	Brenda Milano	NEC	4–25	3–15	11th	DNQ	
2012–13	John Thurston	NEC	11–19	8–10	7th	Quarterfinal (0–1)	
2013–14	John Thurston	NEC	19–11	10–8	5th	Quarterfinal (0–1)	
2014–15	John Thurston	NEC	15–19	9–9	5th	Champions (3–0)	First Round (0–1)
2015–16	John Thurston	NEC	7–22	4–14	9th	DNQ	
2016–17	John Thurston	NEC	8–22	6–12	T-7th	Quarterfinal (0–1)	
2017–18	John Thurston	NEC	13–17	9–9	T-3rd	Quarterfinal (0–1)	
2018–19	Linda Cimino	NEC	18–13	12–6	3rd	Quarterfinal (0–1)	
2019–20	Linda Cimino	NEC	8–21	4–14	10th	DNQ	
47 seasons			384–872	155-435	0 NEC titles (Regular Season)	7–13 in NEC Tournament; 1 NEC tournament titles	0–1 in NCAA Tournament; 1 bids
Legend
Conference regular season champion Conference tournament champion Conference regular season and conference tournament champion Post-season tournament invitation Post-season tournament champion NCAA national champion

== Coaching history ==
		Overall	Conference	
Name	Years	Won-Lost	Won-Lost	Note
Christine McGowan	1973–74 (1yr)	9–5 (.643)		
Dianne Nolan	1974–79 (5yr)	64–38 (.627)		
Mary Convy	1979–82 (3yr)	25–51 (.329)		
John Woods	1982–83 (1yr)	5–22 (.185)		
Dominick Vulpis	1983–86 (9yr)	27–49 (.355)		
Kevin A. Jones	1986–87 (1yr)	14–15 (.483)	9–7 (.563)	1987 NEC Coach of the Year
Cecil King	1987–88 (1yr)	4–22 (.154)	2–14 (.125)	
Irma Garcia	1988–99 (11yr)	68–228 (.230)	36–151 (.193)	1998 NEC Coach of the Year
Steve Fagan	1999–00 (1yr)	2–25 (.074)	1–17 (.056)	
Christine Cunningham	2000–03 (3yr)	9–72 (.111)	6–48 (.111)	
Brenda Milano	2003–12 (9yr)	58–201 (.224)	39–116 (.252)	
John Thurston	2012–2018 (6yr)	73–110 (.399)	46–62 (.426)	First coach to win NEC Conference tournament and make NCAA Tournament Appearance.
Linda Cimino	2018–	26–34 (.433)	16–20 (.444)	
Totals	1973–2019	384–872 (.306)	155–435 (.263)	

== Tournament results ==
=== NCAA ===
The Terriers appeared in their first NCAA Tournament in 2015, a 33–89 loss to first seed and eventual champions Connecticut in the Albany Regional at Storrs, Connecticut.

Year	Round	Opponent	Result, Score
2015	First Round	Connecticut	L, 33–89

== Rivalry ==
The fiercest rival of the Terriers were the LIU Brooklyn Blackbirds (now LIU Sharks). They have competed annually since their first match on February 21, 1975. During the 1993–94 season the women's basketball programs of St. Francis College and Long Island University contested their first official Battle of Brooklyn match. As of the 2019–20 season, the Terriers lead the series 14–13.

== Terrier records ==
	St. Francis College Records		
	Game	Season	Career
Points	47 Pam Curcio (December 8, 1999)	598 Jade Johnson (2018–19)	1,929 Karen Erving-Schiera (1987–91)
Rebounds	25 Karen Erving-Schiera (February 14, 1989)	372 Karen Abrams (1986–87)	1,049 Karen Erving-Schiera (1987–91)
Assists	17 Sandy Salerno (February 19, 1991)	268 Amy O’Neill (2018–19)	589 Sandy Salerno (1987–91)
Steals	9 Melissa Gialanella (September 12, 1998)	156 Sharon McAdams (1980–81)	354 Sharon McAdams (1977–81)
Blocked Shots	9 Katja Bavendam (February 23, 2008)	93 Katja Bavendam (2006–07)	236 Katja Bavendam (2004–08)

In the 2018-19 season, Amy O'Neill became the first Terrier to record a triple-double. She did so twice during the season, first at Sacred Heart (2/2/19) and again at home against LIU Brooklyn (2/16/19). O'Neill also led the country by averaging 8.6 assists per game.

== Accolades ==
=== Northeast Conference (1986–2023) ===
Year	NEC Player of the Year	NEC Defensive Player of the Year	NEC Coach of the Year	First Team All-NEC	Second Team ALL-NEC	NEC Rookie of the Year
1986–87			Kevin A. Jones			
1987–88						
1988–89						
1989–90						
1990–91						Clare Guerriero
1991–92						
1992–93						
1993–94						
1994–95						
1995–96						
1996–97						
1997–98			Irma Garcia	Christine Taps		
1998–99				Carolyn Harvey		
1999–00						
2000–01						
2001–02						
2002–03						
2003–04						
2004–05					Kim Bennett	
2005–06						
2006–07					Tiffany Hill	
2007–08					Tiffany Hill	
2008–09					Kara Ayers	
2009–10						
2010–11						
2011–12						
2012–13						
2013–14					Eilidh Simpson	
2014–15					Jaymee Veney	
2015–16		Leah Fechko		Leah Fechko		
2016–17						
2017–18					Jade Johnson	
2018–19				Amy O'Neill	Jade Johnson	
2019–20						Nevena Dimitrijevic

== Terriers in professional leagues ==
- Amy O'Neill ('19), signed with the Sandringham Sabres of the NBL1.
- Alex Delaney ('18), signed with the Mackay Meteorettes of the Queensland Basketball League in Australia.
- Leah Fechko ('16), signed with the women's Killester Basketball Club of the Premier League in Ireland.
- Eilidh Simpson ('15), signed with CD Zamarat of the Liga Femenina de Baloncesto in Spain.

== Retired numbers ==
No.	Player	Career
15	Jeanne Zatorski	1975–79
40	Karen Erving-Schiera	1988–91

The St. Francis Brooklyn women's basketball program retired their first two numbers in 2018. The ceremony's coincided with the 50th anniversary of St. Francis College being a coeducational institution. Zatorski's number 15 was retired on December 15, 2018, during halftime of a Terriers game. Zatorski broke various Terrier records while she was playing and still holds the record for most field goals in a season with 209 in 1977–78. Erving-Schiera's number 40 was retired on February 9, 2019. Erving-Schiera is the programs leading scorer and rebounder.
