= NCAA Men's Water Polo Championship appearances by school =

The following is a list of National Collegiate Athletic Association college water polo teams from all divisions that qualified for the NCAA Men's Water Polo Championship since its debut in the 1969–70 school year. The list features the qualified schools along with appearances, years, active streak, debut, last, and best result. From 1969 to 1994, the tournament featured a round of eight-team bracket and a single-elimination format along with consolation. From 1994 to 2012, the tournament consisted of only a four-team bracket with a semifinals, third place, and championship match. Since 2012, the tournament had teams qualifying from the first round to semifinals based on regular season performance and other measures.

NCAA Men's Water Polo Championship
School	Appearances	Years	Active Streak	Debut	Last	Best Result
Air Force	8	1974, 1978, 1979, 1981, 1986, 1990, 1994, 2012	—	1974	2012	Semifinals (2012)
Arizona^{†}	3	1975, 1976, 1977	—	1975	1977	First Round (1975, 1976, 1977)
Army^{†}	1	1975	—	1975	1975	First Round (1975)
Biola	1	2023	—	2023	2023	First Round (2023)
Brown	12	1977, 1979, 1981, 1982, 1983, 1984, 1985, 1986, 1987, 1989, 1990, 2014	—	1977	2014	First Round (1977, 1979, 1981, 1982, 1983, 1984, 1985, 1986, 1987, 1989, 1990, 2014)
Bucknell	8	1977, 1978, 1979, 1980, 1985, 2016, 2019, 2020	—	1977	2020	First Round (1977, 1978, 1979, 1980, 1985, 2016, 2019, 2020)
Cal State Fullerton	2	1971, 1974	—	1971	1974	Semifinals (1971, 1974)
California	33	1969, 1973, 1974, 1975, 1977, 1978, 1979, 1980, 1981, 1982, 1983, 1984, 1986, 1987, 1988, 1989, 1990, 1991, 1992, 1993, 1994, 1995, 2002, 2006, 2007, 2010, 2015, 2016, 2017, 2020, 2021, 2022, 2023	—	1969	2023	Champions (1973, 1974, 1975, 1977, 1983, 1984, 1987, 1988, 1990, 1991, 1992, 2006, 2007, 2016, 2021, 2022, 2023)
California Baptist	2	2020, 2024	—	2020	2024	First Round (2020, 2024)
Claremont–Harvey Mudd	1	2015	—	2015	2015	First Round (2015)
Colorado State^{†}	2	1969, 1970	—	1969	1970	First Round (1969, 1970)
Concordia University Irvine (CUI)	1	2025	1 (since 2025)	2025	2025	First Round (2025)
Fordham	5	2021, 2022, 2023, 2024, 2025	5 (Since 2021)	2021	2025	Semifinals (2024, 2025)
George Washington	2	2017, 2018	—	2017	2018	First Round (2017, 2018)
Harvard	3	2016, 2017, 2019	—	2016	2019	Semifinals (2016)
Little Rock^{†}	2	1988, 1989	—	1988	1989	First Round (1988, 1989)
Long Beach State	14	1969, 1970, 1971, 1973, 1975, 1981, 1983, 1985, 1988, 1989, 1991, 2018, 2021, 2024	—	1969	2024	Runner–Up (1981)
Loyola Chicago^{†}	10	1972, 1976, 1977, 1978, 1979, 1980, 1982, 1983, 1984, 1985	—	1972	1985	First Round (1972, 1976, 1977, 1978, 1979, 1980, 1982, 1983, 1984, 1985)
Loyola Marymount	8	2001, 2003, 2004, 2005, 2007, 2008, 2009, 2010	—	2001	2010	Semifinals (2001, 2003, 2004, 2005, 2007, 2008, 2009, 2010)
Massachusetts^{†}	7	1993, 1994, 1995, 1996, 1998, 1999, 2001	—	1993	2001	Semifinals (1993, 1994, 1995, 1996, 1998, 1999, 2001)
Navy	14	1984, 1986, 1987, 1988, 1990, 1991, 1992, 1993, 1994, 2000, 2003, 2006, 2007, 2008	—	1984	2008	Semifinals (2000, 2003, 2006, 2007, 2008)
New Mexico^{†}	3	1971, 1972, 1973	—	1971	1973	First Round (1971, 1972, 1973)
Pacific	5	1993, 2013, 2017, 2019, 2022	–	1993	2022	Runner–Up (2013, 2019)
Pepperdine	13	1977, 1978, 1980, 1984, 1986, 1987, 1989, 1990, 1991, 1992, 1994, 1997, 2019	—	1977	2019	Champions (1997)
Pittsburgh^{†}	1	1976	—	1976	1976	First Round (1976)
Pomona–Pitzer	3	2016, 2017, 2018	—	2016	2018	First Round (2016, 2017, 2018)
Princeton	11	1992, 2004, 2009, 2011, 2015, 2018, 2021, 2022, 2023, 2024, 2025	5 (since 2021)	1992	2025	Semifinals (2004, 2009, 2011, 2023)
Queens College^{†}	2	1997, 2002	—	1997	2002	Semifinals (1997, 2002)
Salem (WV)	1	2024	—	2024	2024	First Round (2024)
San Jose State	6	1970, 1971, 1972, 1973, 2023, 2025	1 (since 2025)	1970	2025	Runner–Up (1971)
Slippery Rock^{†}	2	1983, 1991	—	1983	1991	First Round (1983, 1991)
Southern California (USC)	40	1969, 1970, 1972, 1973, 1980, 1982, 1983, 1984, 1986, 1987, 1988, 1992, 1993, 1994, 1996, 1997, 1998, 2000, 2003, 2005, 2006, 2007, 2008, 2009, 2010, 2011, 2012, 2013, 2014, 2015, 2016, 2017, 2018, 2019, 2020, 2021, 2022, 2023, 2024, 2025	21 (since 2005)	1969	2025	Champions (1998, 2003, 2005, 2008, 2009, 2010, 2011, 2012, 2013, 2018)
St. Francis Brooklyn^{†}	4	2005, 2010, 2012, 2013	—	2005	2013	Semifinals (2005, 2010, 2012, 2013)
Stanford	36	1970, 1971, 1974, 1975, 1976, 1977, 1978, 1979, 1980, 1981, 1982, 1984, 1985, 1986, 1987, 1988, 1989, 1990, 1992, 1993, 1994, 1998, 1999, 2001, 2002, 2003, 2004, 2005, 2008, 2013, 2014, 2018, 2019, 2020, 2024, 2025	2 (since 2024)	1970	2025	Champions (1976, 1978, 1980, 1981, 1985, 1986, 1993, 1994, 2001, 2002, 2019)
Texas A&M^{†}	2	1976, 1978	—	1976	1978	First Round (1976, 1978)
UC Davis	10	1974, 1975, 1996, 1997, 2016, 2017, 2019, 2021, 2022, 2025	1 (since 2025)	1974	2025	Semifinals (1996, 1997, 2021)
UC Irvine	22	1969, 1970, 1971, 1972, 1973, 1974, 1975, 1976, 1977, 1978, 1980, 1981, 1982, 1983, 1985, 1987, 1988, 1989, 1991, 1992, 1993, 2023	—	1969	2023	Champions (1970, 1982, 1989)
UC San Diego	15	1989, 1991, 1992, 1993, 1995, 1998, 1999, 2000, 2002, 2006, 2011, 2013, 2014, 2015, 2018	—	1989	2018	Runner–Up (2000)
UC Santa Barbara	12	1969, 1970, 1972, 1973, 1974, 1976, 1979, 1980, 1981, 1982, 1985, 1990	—	1969	1990	Champions (1979)
UCLA	40	1969, 1970, 1971, 1972, 1973, 1974, 1975, 1976, 1979, 1981, 1982, 1983, 1984, 1985, 1986, 1987, 1988, 1990, 1991, 1994, 1995, 1996, 1999, 2000, 2001, 2004, 2009, 2011, 2012, 2014, 2015, 2016, 2017, 2018, 2020, 2021, 2022 2023, 2024, 2025	6 (since 2020)	1969	2025	Champions (1969, 1971, 1972, 1995, 1996, 1999, 2000, 2004, 2014, 2015, 2017, 2020, 2024, 2025)
Washington^{†}	1	1971	—	1971	1971	First Round (1971)
Whittier	2	2013, 2014	—	2013	2014	First Round (2013, 2014)
Yale^{†}	2	1969, 1972	—	1969	1972	First Round (1969, 1972)
Key: ^{†} – Defunct
