= 2013–14 NJIT Highlanders women's basketball team =

Intercollegiate basketball season

2013–14 NJIT Highlanders women's basketball
- Conference: Independent
- Record: 8–21
- Head coach: Steve Lanpher (2nd season)
- Assistant coaches: Mark McCaleb (2nd season); La Kea Jones (4th season); Epiphany Smith (2nd season)
- Home arena: Fleisher Center

2013–14 NCAA Division I women's basketball independents standings
	Conf.				Overall
Team	W		L	PCT	W		L	PCT
NJIT	0	–	0	–	8	–	21	.276
As of March 8, 2014; Rankings from AP Poll

The 2013–14 NJIT Highlanders women's basketball team represented New Jersey Institute of Technology during the 2013–14 NCAA Division I women's basketball season. The Highlanders, led by second year head coach Steve Lanpher, played their home games at the Fleisher Center and were in their first year as an Independent after the Great West Conference folded.

== Roster ==
Number	Name	Position	Height	Year	Hometown
1	Alana Dudley	Guard	5–9	Freshman	Whippany, New Jersey
2	Kim Tullis	Guard	5–9	Junior	Silver Spring, Maryland
3	Alyssa Albanese	Guard	5–3	Junior	Fort Washington, Maryland
4	Ruta Vetra	Guard	6–0	Freshman	Jūrmala, Latvia
10	Ronni Grandison	Guard/Forward	5–10	Sophomore	West Chester, Ohio
11	Nicole Matická	Center	6–3	Junior	Bratislava, Slovakia
12	Olivia Dudley	Guard	5–9	Freshman	Whippany, New Jersey
13	Denisa Domiterová	Guard	5–9	Junior	Zvolen, Slovakia
14	Martina Matejčíková	Forward	5–11	Junior	Banská Bystrica, Slovakia
15	Shakia Robinson	Forward	6–1	Graduate	North Wales, Pennsylvania
21	Maria Ruban	Center	6–5	Freshman	Kyiv, Ukraine
24	Camerin Spahn	Guard	6–0	Freshman	Freehold, New Jersey
34	Leah Horton	Forward	6–1	Sophomore	Macungie, Pennsylvania
50	Uju Nwankwo	Forward	6–0	Senior	Bloomfield, Connecticut

== Media ==
NJIT will provide audio of all home contests on Highlanders-All Access with Matt Provence and Michael Ventola calling the action. Currently no video or radio is expected for the games.

== Schedule ==
Date time, TV	Opponent	Result	Record	Site (attendance) city, state
Regular Season
11/08/2013; 6:00 pm	at Stony Brook	L 44–50	0–1	Stony Brook University Arena (1,630); Stony Brook, NY
11/11/2013; 7:00 pm	at Lehigh	L 72–77	0–2	Stabler Arena (566); Bethlehem, PA
11/13/2013; 7:00 pm	New Hampshire	L 40–53	0–3	Fleisher Center (766); Newark, NJ
11/17/2013; 2:00 pm	at Howard	L 73–80	0–4	Burr Gymnasium (172); Washington, D.C.
11/20/2013; 7:00 pm	at LIU Brooklyn	W 60–58	1–4	Steinberg Wellness Center (485); Brooklyn, NY
11/23/2013; 2:00 pm	at Northeastern	L 55–79	1–5	Cabot Center (298); Boston, MA
11/26/2013; 7:00 pm	at St. Francis Brooklyn	L 53–58	1–6	Generoso Pope Athletic Complex (115); Brooklyn, NY
11/30/2013; 12:00 pm	Bucknell	W 61–59	2–6	Fleisher Center (716); Newark, NJ
12/02/2013; 8:00 pm	at South Dakota State	L 46–71	2–7	Frost Arena (1,141); Brookings, SD
12/05/2013; 7:00 pm	Lafayette	L 45–61	2–8	Fleisher Center (500); Newark, NJ
12/07/2013; 7:00 pm	at Rhode Island	L 42–57	2–9	Ryan Center (324); Kingston, RI
12/10/2013; 7:00 pm	Albany	L 64–75	2–10	Fleisher Center (500); Newark, NJ
12/19/2013; 7:00 pm	Fairleigh Dickinson	W 84–71	3–10	Fleisher Center (399); Newark, NJ
12/21/2013; 2:00 pm	at Seton Hall	L 48–74	3–11	Prudential Center (427); South Orange, NJ
12/28/2013; 2:00 pm	VCU	L 72–77	3–12	Fleisher Center (594); Newark, NJ
12/30/2014; 7:00 pm	Wagner	W 58–52	4–12	Fleisher Center (300); Newark, NJ
01/02/2014; 7:00 pm	Clemson	L 37–84	4–13	Fleisher Center (299); Newark, NJ
01/05/2014; 2:00 pm	Marshall	L 56–57	4–14	Fleisher Center (300); Newark, NJ
01/07/2014; 5:30 pm	at Delaware State	L 72–75 ^{OT}	4–15	Memorial Hall (87); Dover, DE
01/11/2014; 2:00 pm	Brown	W 48–43	5–15	Fleisher Center (499); Newark, NJ
01/15/2014; 12:00 pm	Harvard	L 56–75	5–16	Fleisher Center (900); Newark, NJ
01/18/2014; 2:00 pm	Dartmouth	L 45–48	5–17	Fleisher Center (488); Newark, NJ
01/25/2014; 5:00 pm	at Penn	L 48–84	5–18	The Palestra (273); Philadelphia, PA
01/29/2014; 6:00 pm	at Maryland Eastern Shore	L 61–68	5–19	Hytche Athletic Center (1,010); Princess Anne, MD
02/03/2014; 8:00 pm	at SIU Edwardsville	L 54–59	5–20	Vadalabene Center (502); Edwardsville, IL
02/17/2014; 7:00 pm	Rutgers–Newark	W 71–42	6–20	Fleisher Center (400); Newark, NJ
02/22/2014; 2:00 pm	at Incarnate Word	W 57–48	7–20	McDermott Convocation Center (225); San Antonio, TX
03/04/2014; 7:00 pm	UMass Lowell	W 87–75	8–20	Fleisher Center; Newark, NJ
03/08/2014; 1:00 pm	at Hofstra	L 68–77	8–21	Hofstra Arena; Hempstead, NY
*Non-conference game. ^{#}Rankings from AP Poll. (#) Tournament seedings in parentheses. All times are in Eastern Time.

== See also ==
- 2013–14 NJIT Highlanders men's basketball team
