= 2014–15 St. Francis Brooklyn Terriers women's basketball team =

Intercollegiate basketball season

2014–15 St. Francis Brooklyn Terriers women's basketball

Northeast Conference tournament champions

NCAA, First round
- Conference: Northeast Conference
- Record: 15–19 (9–9 NEC)
- Head coach: John Thurston (3rd season)
- Associate head coach: Dionne Dodson (7th season)
- Assistant coaches: Nettie Respondek (3rd season); Kaitlyn Vican (4th season)
- Home arena: Generoso Pope Athletic Complex

2014–15 Northeast Conference women's basketball standings
	Conf.				Overall
Team	W		L	PCT	W		L	PCT
Bryant	14	–	4	.778	22	–	9	.710
Central Connecticut	14	–	4	.778	19	–	13	.594
Robert Morris	13	–	5	.722	17	–	15	.531
Sacred Heart	11	–	7	.611	16	–	13	.552
St. Francis Brooklyn†	9	–	9	.500	15	–	19	.441
Fairleigh Dickinson	7	–	11	.389	10	–	20	.333
LIU Brooklyn	6	–	12	.333	9	–	21	.300
Mount St. Mary's	6	–	12	.333	8	–	22	.267
Wagner	5	–	13	.278	7	–	22	.241
Saint Francis (PA)	5	–	13	.278	6	–	23	.207
† 2015 NEC tournament winner As of March 15, 2015; Rankings from AP poll

The 2014–15 St. Francis Brooklyn Terriers women's basketball team represented St. Francis College during the 2014–15 NCAA Division I women's basketball season. The Terrier's home games were played at the Generoso Pope Athletic Complex. The team has been a member of the Northeast Conference since 1988. St. Francis Brooklyn was coached by John Thurston, who was in his third year at the helm of the Terriers.

The Terriers finished the regular season at 12–18 overall and 9–9 in conference play. They qualified for the 2015 NEC tournament with the 5th seed and went on to win the Tournament Championship, the first in program history. The Terriers became the first team in NEC history to win a tournament title with three straight road wins. With the win, the Terriers received the conferences automatic bid to the 2015 NCAA Division I women's basketball tournament. The Terriers lost to #1 seed Connecticut in the Albany Regional, 33–89.

In addition to their athletic achievements, the team placed second in the nation for grade point average (3.656 GPA). Among the players were starting point guard Katie Fox who finished with a perfect 4.0 and Sarah Benedetti (3.96 GPA) who earned the ECAC Division I Female Scholar-Athlete of the Year Award.

== Roster ==
2014–15 St. Francis Brooklyn Terriers women's basketball team
Players
Coaches

Pos.	#	Name	Height	Year	Hometown
G	1	Blair Arthur	5 ft 6 in (1.68 m)	Fr	Allegan, Michigan
G	3	Taylor Watson	5 ft 8 in (1.73 m)	Jr	Southampton, New Jersey
F	4	Alex Delaney	5 ft 10 in (1.78 m)	Fr	Sydney, Australia
G	10	Becky Pund	5 ft 7 in (1.7 m)	Fr	Audubon, New Jersey
G	11	Rachel Iozzia	5 ft 10 in (1.78 m)	Fr	Bayville, New Jersey
G	12	Leah Fechko	5 ft 8 in (1.73 m)	Jr	Twinsburg, Ohio
F	14	Sarah Benedetti	5 ft 10 in (1.78 m)	Sr	Canton, Connecticut
F	15	Cassidy Derda	6 ft 2 in (1.88 m)	Fr	South Burlington, Vermont
G	21	Katie Fox	5 ft 5 in (1.65 m)	Sr	Twinsburg, Ohio
F	34	Jaymee Veney	6 ft 0 in (1.83 m)	Sr	Fairborn, Ohio
F	35	Olivia Levey	6 ft 0 in (1.83 m)	So	Seymour, Connecticut
G	41	Eilidh Simpson	5 ft 7 in (1.7 m)	Sr	Melbourne, Australia
F	50	Colette Hounshell	6 ft 1 in (1.85 m)	Sr	Kirtland, Ohio

Head coach

- John Thurston (Seton Hall '70)

Assistant coach(es)

- Dionne Dodson (Muskingum '97)
- Nettie Respondek (Vanderbilt '98)
- Kaitlyn Vican (Fordham '11)

Legend

- (C) Team captain
- (S) Suspended
- (I) Ineligible
- (W) Walk-on
- Injured
- Current redshirt

Roster
Last update: November 9, 2015

== Schedule ==
Date time, TV	Opponent	Result	Record	High points	High rebounds	High assists	Site (attendance) city, state
Non-conference regular season
November 14, 2014*; 7:00 pm	at Albany; Preseason WNIT	L 47–90	0–1	18 – Veney	5 – Benedetti	4 – Simpson	SEFCU Arena (1,290); Albany, NY
November 21, 2014*; 4:00 pm	vs. North Dakota; Preseason WNIT	L 63–70	0–2	17 – Fechko	9 – Fechko	4 – Fox	SECU Arena; Towson, MD
November 22, 2014*; 4:00 pm	vs. Rider; Preseason WNIT	W 71–60	1–2	16 – Veney	15 – Veney	3 – Fox	SECU Arena (N/A); Towson, MD
November 25, 2014*; 7:00 pm	at NJIT	L 50–57 ^{OT}	1–3	17 – Simpson	9 – Veney	2 – Fechko	Fleisher Center (603); Newark, NJ
November 29, 2014*; 2:30 pm	vs. Saint Joseph's; Seton Hall Thanksgiving Classic	L 42–64	1–4	12 – Simpson	6 – Fechko, Veney	5 – Fox	Walsh Gymnasium (362); South Orange, NJ
November 30, 2014*; 12:00 pm	vs. Saint Peter's; Seton Hall Thanksgiving Classic	W 48–36	2–4	15 – Simpson	8 – Simpson	2 – Simpson	Walsh Gymnasium (N/A); South Orange, NJ
December 3, 2014*; 7:00 pm	Stony Brook	W 57–55	3–4	16 – Fechko	7 – Fechko	5 – Fox	Generoso Pope Athletic Complex; Brooklyn, NY
December 5, 2014*; 7:00 pm	Lafayette	L 51–73	3–5	16 – Benedetti	9 – Fechko	4 – Fox	Generoso Pope Athletic Complex; Brooklyn, NY
December 8, 2014*; 7:00 pm	at Army	L 55–61	3–6	17 – Benedetti	10 – Veney	5 – Veney, Fox	Christl Arena (456); West Point, NY
December 17, 2014*; 7:00 pm	Vermont	L 61–63	3–7	17 – Benedetti	9 – Veney	9 – Fox	Generoso Pope Athletic Complex (150); Brooklyn, NY
December 20, 2014*; 12:00 pm	Georgia Tech	L 59–65	3–8	19 – Simpson	9 – Veney	5 – Benedetti	Generoso Pope Athletic Complex (415); Brooklyn, NY
December 30, 2014*; 7:00 pm	at UMass Lowell	L 62–64	3–9	20 – Veney	14 – Veney	6 – Fox	Costello Athletic Center (517); Lowell, MA
Northeast Conference Regular Season
January 3, 2015; 1:00 pm	at Sacred Heart	L 55–71	3–10 (0–1)	19 – Veney	9 – Fechko	6 – Fox	William H. Pitt Center (210); Fairfield, CT
January 5, 2015; 1:00 pm	Bryant	L 53–65	3–11 (0–2)	15 – Fechko	9 – Fechko	3 – Simpson	Generoso Pope Athletic Complex; Brooklyn, NY
January 10, 2015; 4:30 pm	at Mount St. Mary's	L 48–56	3–12 (0–3)	18 – Simpson	12 – Veney	5 – Fox	Knott Arena (210); Emmitsburg, MD
January 12, 2015; 7:00 pm	at Fairleigh Dickinson	W 72–61	4–12 (1–3)	22 – Benedetti	13 – Veney	4 – Fechko	Rothman Center (152); Hackensack, NJ
January 17, 2015; 1:00 pm	at Robert Morris	L 64–67	4–13 (1–4)	25 – Simpson	14 – Fechko	3 – Fox, Fechko	Charles L. Sewall Center (404); Moon Township, PA
January 19, 2015; 7:00 pm	at Saint Francis (PA)	W 70–55	5–13 (2–4)	18 – Benedetti, Veney	18 – Fechko	5 – Fox	DeGol Arena (508); Loretto, PA
January 24, 2015; 1:00 pm	Robert Morris	L 64–69	5–14 (2–5)	20 – Benedetti	9 – Fechko	7 – Fechko	Generoso Pope Athletic Complex (485); Brooklyn, NY
January 26, 2015; 3:00 pm	Central Connecticut	L 49–51	5–15 (2–6)	11 – Benedetti	6 – Fechko, Delaney	2 – Fox, Delaney	Generoso Pope Athletic Complex (100); Brooklyn, NY
January 31, 2015; 1:00 pm	LIU Brooklyn	W 62–53	6–15 (3–6)	22 – Benedetti	9 – Fechko	4 – Benedetti	Generoso Pope Athletic Complex (250); Brooklyn, NY
February 2, 2015; 5:00 pm	Mount St. Mary's	W 52–46	7–15 (4–6)	15 – Benedetti	5 – Simpson	4 – Fox	Generoso Pope Athletic Complex; Brooklyn, NY
February 7, 2015; 1:00 pm	at Wagner	L 60–63	7–16 (4–7)	28 – Benedetti	10 – Veney	5 – Fox	Spiro Sports Center (895); Staten Island, NY
February 9, 2015; 7:00 pm	at Central Connecticut	L 43–61	7–17 (4–8)	14 – Veney	6 – Simpson	4 – Benedetti	William H. Detrick Gymnasium (512); New Britain, CT
February 14, 2015; 1:00 pm	Sacred Heart	W 77–53	8–17 (5–8)	23 – Benedetti	12 – Veney	5 – 3 tied	Generoso Pope Athletic Complex (125); Brooklyn, NY
February 16, 2015; 2:00 pm	Wagner	W 67–55	9–17 (6–8)	21 – Veney	13 – Benedetti	4 – Fechko, Simpson	Generoso Pope Athletic Complex; Brooklyn, NY
February 21, 2015; 1:00 pm	Saint Francis (PA)	W 71–55	10–17 (7–8)	25 – Veney	14 – Veney	6 – Simpson, Fechko	Generoso Pope Athletic Complex (275); Brooklyn, NY
February 23, 2015; 7:00 pm	Fairleigh Dickinson	L 57–60	10–18 (7–9)	31 – Veney	9 – Fechko	6 – Fox	Generoso Pope Athletic Complex (125); Brooklyn, NY
February 28, 2015; 1:00 pm	at Bryant	W 62–52	11–18 (8–9)	19 – Veney	8 – Veney	5 – Benedetti	Chace Athletic Center (372); Smithfield, RI
March 2, 2015; 7:00 pm	at LIU Brooklyn; Battle of Brooklyn	W 73–49	12–18 (9–9)	17 – Benedetti	9 – Veney	4 – 3 tied	Steinberg Wellness Center (257); Brooklyn, NY
Northeast Conference tournament
March 8, 2015; 2:00 pm	at (4) Sacred Heart; Quarterfinals	W 77–59	13–18	25 – Veney	8 – Veney, Fechko	4 – Simpson	William H. Pitt Center (351); Fairfield, CT
March 11, 2015; 7:00 pm	at (1) Central Connecticut; Semifinals	W 71–63 ^{2OT}	14–18	24 – Veney	11 – Veney, Fechko	3 – Fechko	William H. Detrick Gymnasium (2,064); New Britain, CT
March 15, 2015; 1:00 pm	at (3) Robert Morris; Championship game	W 77–62	15–18	29 – Benedetti	9 – Benedetti	6 – Fox	Charles L. Sewall Center (451); Moon Township, PA
NCAA Tournament
March 21, 2015*; 9:00 pm, ESPN2	at No. 1 Connecticut; First round	L 33–89	15–19	13 – Benedetti	5 – Fechko	2 – Fechko	Harry A. Gampel Pavilion (3,666); Storrs, CT
*Non-conference game. ^{#}Rankings from AP Poll,. (#) Tournament seedings in parentheses. All times are in Eastern Time..

== See also ==
- 2014–15 St. Francis Brooklyn Terriers men's basketball team
