= Irma Garcia =

Athletics director at St. Francis College

Current position
- Title: Athletic director
- Team: Manhattan
- Conference: MAAC

Biographical details
- Education: St. Francis College (B.S.); Brooklyn College (M.S.)

Playing career
- 1976–1980: St. Francis Brooklyn

Coaching career (HC unless noted)
- 1988–1999: St. Francis Brooklyn

Administrative career (AD unless noted)
- 1999–2007: St. Francis Brooklyn (associate AD)
- 2007–2023: St. Francis Brooklyn
- 2023–present: Manhattan

Head coaching record
- Overall: 68–228

Accomplishments and honors

Awards
- NEC Coach of the Year (1998); ECAC Katherine Ley Award (2009); NACWAA D1 (FCS) Administrator of the Year (2015)

Irma Garcia is an American college athletic administrator and former basketball coach. She is athletic director at Manhattan College, a position she has held since 2023. She previously held the same position at St. Francis College in Brooklyn until the school disbanded its entire athletics program following the 2022–23 school year. When she took the job in 2007, Garcia was the first Latina athletic director in NCAA Division I sports. Garcia served as the head women's basketball coach at St. Francis from 1988 to 1999.

== Early life and education ==
Garcia was raised in a Catholic-Puerto Rican family in Brooklyn and has seven siblings. She attended St. Angela Hall High School in Brooklyn. In 1976, she enrolled in St. Francis College, and played women's basketball for coach Dianne Nolan. Upon graduation in 1980, Garcia taught physical education and coached girls' basketball at St. Joseph by the Sea High School on Staten Island. In 1988, she returned to be the head coach at St. Francis College. After 11 seasons, she stopped coaching and was hired as the associate athletics director. In 2001, while she was the associate athletic director at St. Francis, Garcia earned her master's degree from Brooklyn College in sports administration.

== Administrative career ==
In 2007, Garcia became the athletic director of the Terriers replacing longtime director Edward Aquilone. At the time of her hire and as of 2010, she was the country's only female Latina athletic director in Division I sports. For the 2014–15 academic year, Garcia was named NACWAA D1 (FCS) Administrator of the Year. The award was in part because of the Terriers success in Men's Soccer (NEC Champions and NCAA Tournament Participants), Men's Basketball (NEC Regular Season Champions and NIT Participants) and Women's Basketball (NEC Champions and NCAA Tournament Participants).

During Garcia's tenure as director of athletic the St. Francis College Athletics program changed their brand from St. Francis (NY) to St. Francis Brooklyn. The College previously came to be known as St. Francis (NY) when the athletics program joined the Division I Northeast Conference in 1981. In 2018 it was announced that women's soccer and men's volleyball would be added as sports programs to the existing 19 teams at St. Francis College. Both teams will begin play in the 2019–20 school year, with women's soccer starting in fall 2019 and men's volleyball in spring 2020.

In 2023, Garcia was appointed the interim director of athletics at Manhattan College. She took office on August 1, 2023 and her interim tag was removed the following month.

== Head coaching career ==
Record table
Season	Team	Overall	Conference	Standing	Postseason
St. Francis Brooklyn Terriers (Northeast Conference) (1988–1999)
1988–89	St. Francis	3–24			
1989–90	St. Francis	6–20			
1990–91	St. Francis	5–22			
1991–92	St. Francis	1–26			
1992–93	St. Francis	3–23			
1993–94	St. Francis	9–19		8th	
1994–95	St. Francis	12–16		8th	
1995–96	St. Francis	3–23		10th	
1996–97	St. Francis	5–22		10th	
1997–98	St. Francis	11–16	7–9	5th	
1998–99	St. Francis	10–17	9–11	T–6th	
Irma Garcia:		68–228 (.230)	39–151 (.205)		
Total:		68–228 (.230)			
