= 2014 Northeast Conference women's basketball tournament =

- Classification: Division I
- Season: 2013–14
- Teams: 8
- Site: campus sites
- Champions: Robert Morris (5 title)
- Winning coach: Sal Buscaglia (2 title)

2013–14 Northeast Conference women's basketball standings
	Conf.				Overall
Team	W		L	PCT	W		L	PCT
Robert Morris†	14	–	4	.778	21	–	12	.636
Mount St. Mary's	13	–	5	.722	19	–	14	.576
Saint Francis (PA)	11	–	7	.611	15	–	17	.469
Bryant	11	–	7	.611	17	–	15	.531
St. Francis Brooklyn	10	–	8	.556	19	–	11	.633
Sacred Heart	9	–	9	.500	12	–	18	.400
Wagner	8	–	10	.444	9	–	21	.300
LIU Brooklyn	7	–	11	.389	9	–	21	.300
Central Connecticut	5	–	13	.278	11	–	17	.393
Fairleigh Dickinson	2	–	16	.111	3	–	26	.103
† 2014 NEC tournament winner As of 10:03, 1 April 2014 (UTC); Rankings from AP poll

The 2014 Northeast Conference women's basketball tournament was held between March 9, 12, and 16, 2014. The 2014 Northeast Conference tournament featured the league's top eight seeds. The tourney opened on Sunday, March 9 with the quarterfinals, followed by the semifinals on Wednesday, March 12 and the finals on Sunday, March 16. The champion earned a trip to the 2014 NCAA tournament.

== Bracket ==
Quarterfinals; Sunday, March 9 NEC Front Row
1	Robert Morris	65
8	LIU Brooklyn	49
4	Bryant	58
5	St. Francis Brooklyn	53
(Pairings are reseeded after the first round)
2	Mount Saint Mary's	77
7	Wagner	65
3	St. Francis (PA)	132
6	Sacred Heart	124**

Semifinals; Wednesday, March 12 (reseeded); ESPN3
1	Robert Morris	72
4	Bryant	67
2	Mount Saint Mary's	63
3	St. Francis (PA)	68

Championship; Sunday, March 16; ESPNU
1	Robert Morris	78
3	St. Francis (PA)	64

All games were played at the venue of the higher seed
