= John Thurston (basketball) =

American college basketball coach (born 1948)

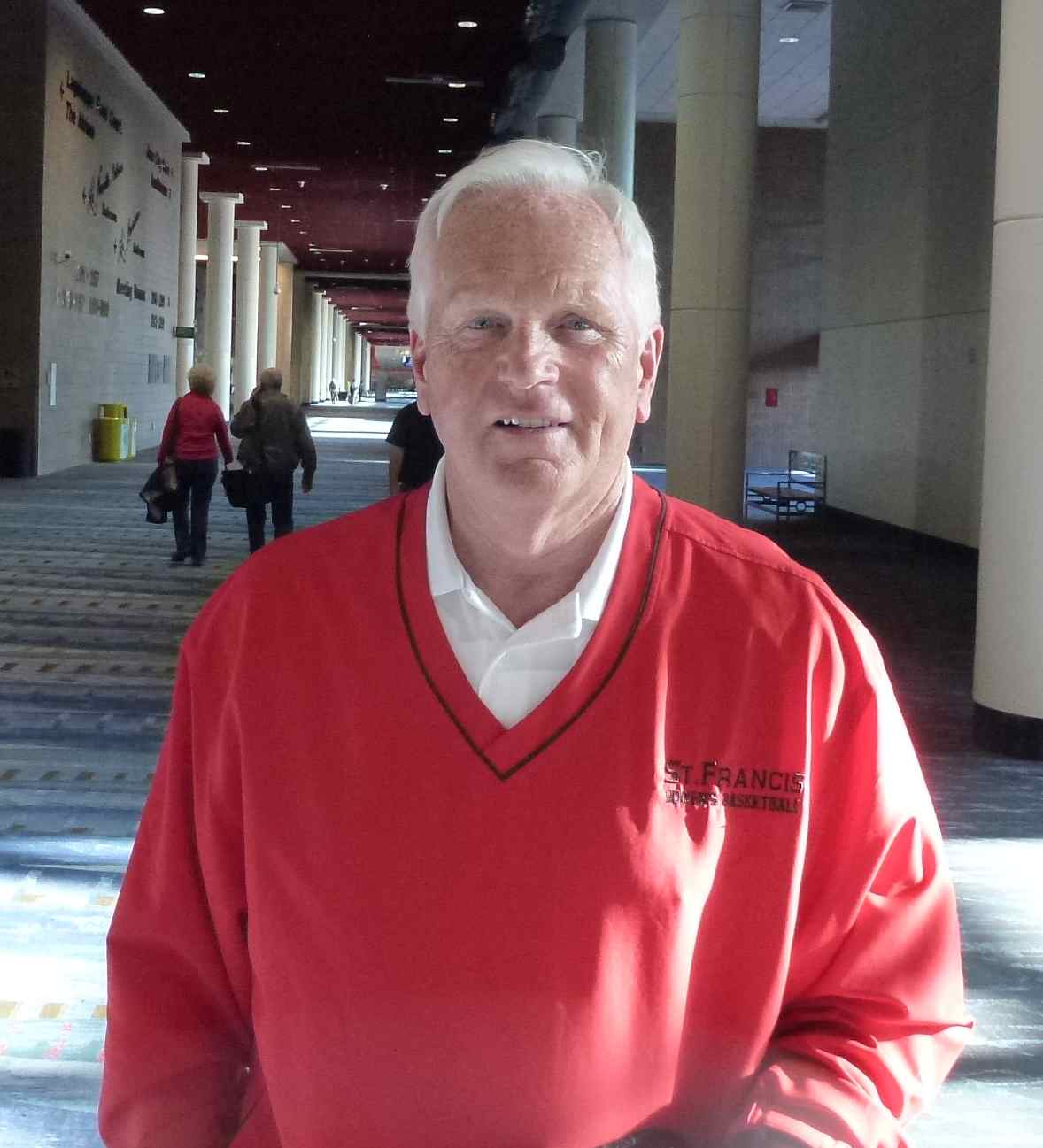

Biographical details
- Born: April 17, 1948 (age 78)

Playing career

Basketball
- 1966–1970: Seton Hall

Coaching career (HC unless noted)

Men's basketball
- 1971–1972: Fairleigh Dickinson–Florham (assistant)
- 1972–1975: Fairleigh Dickinson–Florham
- 1975–1985: James Madison (assistant)
- 1985–1988: James Madison
- 1988–1997: Wingate

Women's basketball
- 2003–2006: UNC Wilmington (assistant)
- 2006–2008: Northwood
- 2008–2010: Fordham (assistant)
- 2010–2012: St. Francis Brooklyn (assistant)
- 2012–2018: St. Francis Brooklyn

Head coaching record
- Overall: 165–232 (men's); 114–131 (women's)
- Tournaments: Men's; 0–1 (NIT); Women's; 0–1 (NCAA Division I)

Accomplishments and honors

Championships
- Women's; 2 FSC regular season (2007–2008); NEC tournament (2015)

Awards
- Men's; CAA Coach of the Year (1987); Women's; FSC Coach of the Year (2008)

John Thurston (born April 17, 1948) is a retired American college basketball coach. He was the head coach of the St. Francis College women's basketball team from 2012 to 2018. Thurston was born in the Bronx, New York and is an alumnus of Archbishop Molloy High School and Seton Hall University. Through both high school and college, Thurston was a two sport player playing baseball and basketball. After graduating high school in 1966, Thurston was drafted by Los Angeles Dodgers in the 1966 MLB Amateur Draft.

== Coaching career ==
Thurston is one of only a few coaches who has been a head coach at the NCAA DI, DII, DIII and NAIA levels in 26 years of coaching men's college basketball from 1971 to 1997. Thurston started out as an assistant basketball coach of men's basketball at Fairleigh Dickinson University's Florham Campus in 1971. Then from 1972 to 1975, he served as the FDU-Florham Devil's head coach. Thurston next served as an assistant to Lou Campanelli at James Madison University, and was promoted to head coach in 1985. With the Dukes, Thurston helped lead the team to three straight trips to the NCAA tournament from 1981 to 1983, and was named Colonial Athletic Association Coach of the Year in 1987. In 1988, he moved to Wingate University as athletic director and head men's basketball coach.

Thurston then began coaching women's basketball. From 2003 to 2005, he was the top assistant at the University of North Carolina at Wilmington, and in 2005, became the head coach at Northwood University, as the first head coach of the women's program. In two seasons with Northwood, he led the Lady Seahawks to two Florida Sun Conference titles, a trip to the NAIA national tournament, and was named Coach of the Year in 2008. After the 2008 season, Thurston resigned from Northwood and became an assistant at Fordham University for two years. In 2010, Thurston was hired as an assistant coach by then Terriers head coach Brenda Milano for the St. Francis Brooklyn Terriers women's basketball program.

In 2012, Thurston was named the head coach of the Terriers women's basketball program. His 2013–14 squad set the program record for wins in a season with 19. The following year, his 2014–15 squad won the NEC tournament and participated in the NCAA tournament, the first in the program's history. After the 2017–18 season Thurston retired from coaching the St. Francis Terriers women's basketball team.

== Head coaching record ==
=== Men's ===
Record table
Season	Team	Overall	Conference	Standing	Postseason
Fairleigh Dickinson–Florham Devils () (1972–1975)
1972–73	Fairleigh Dickinson–Florham	9–15			
1973–74	Fairleigh Dickinson–Florham	12–14			
1974–75	Fairleigh Dickinson–Florham	18–10			
Fairleigh Dickinson–Florham:		39–39 (.500)			
James Madison Dukes (Colonial Athletic Association) (1985–1988)
1985–86	James Madison	5–23	3–11	T–6th	
1986–87	James Madison	20–10	8–6	T–3rd	NIT First Round
1987–88	James Madison	6–11	2–4		
James Madison:		31–44 (.413)	13–21 (.382)		
Wingate Bulldogs (South Atlantic Conference) (1988–1997)
1988–89	Wingate	17–13			
1989–90	Wingate	10–15			
1990–91	Wingate	8–20			
1991–92	Wingate	11–17			
1992–93	Wingate	11–15			
1993–94	Wingate	9–17			
1994–95	Wingate	8–18			
1995–96	Wingate	11–16			
1996–97	Wingate	10–18			
Wingate:		95–149 (.389)			
Total:		165–232 (.416)			

=== Women's ===
Record table
Season	Team	Overall	Conference	Standing	Postseason
Northwood Seahawks (Florida Sun Conference) (2006–2008)
2006–07	Northwood	18–13	8–2	1st	
2007–08	Northwood	23–8	9–3	1st	NAIA First Round
Northwood:		41–21 (.661)	17–5 (.773)		
St. Francis Brooklyn Terriers (Northeast Conference) (2012–2018)
2012–13	St. Francis Brooklyn	11–19	8–10	7th	
2013–14	St. Francis Brooklyn	19–11	10–8	5th	
2014–15	St. Francis Brooklyn	15–19	9–9	5th	NCAA Division I First Round
2015–16	St. Francis Brooklyn	7–22	4–14	9th	
2016–17	St. Francis Brooklyn	8–22	6–12	T–7th	
2017–18	St. Francis Brooklyn	13–17	9–9	T–3rd	
St. Francis Brooklyn:		73–110 (.399)	46–62 (.426)		
Total:		114–131 (.465)			
National champion Postseason invitational champion Conference regular season champion Conference regular season and conference tournament champion Division regular season champion Division regular season and conference tournament champion Conference tournament champion
