= 2015 Northeast Conference women's basketball tournament =

- Classification: Division I
- Season: 2014–15
- Teams: 8
- Site: campus sites
- Champions: St. Francis Brooklyn (1st title)
- Winning coach: John Thurston (1st title)
- MVP: Sarah Benedetti (SFBK)

2014–15 Northeast Conference women's basketball standings
	Conf.				Overall
Team	W		L	PCT	W		L	PCT
Bryant	14	–	4	.778	22	–	9	.710
Central Connecticut	14	–	4	.778	19	–	13	.594
Robert Morris	13	–	5	.722	17	–	15	.531
Sacred Heart	11	–	7	.611	16	–	13	.552
St. Francis Brooklyn†	9	–	9	.500	15	–	19	.441
Fairleigh Dickinson	7	–	11	.389	10	–	20	.333
LIU Brooklyn	6	–	12	.333	9	–	21	.300
Mount St. Mary's	6	–	12	.333	8	–	22	.267
Wagner	5	–	13	.278	7	–	22	.241
Saint Francis (PA)	5	–	13	.278	6	–	23	.207
† 2015 NEC tournament winner As of March 15, 2015; Rankings from AP poll

The 2015 Northeast Conference women's basketball tournament was held between March 8, 11, and 15, 2015. The 2015 Northeast Conference tournament featured the league's top eight seeds. The tourney opened on March 8 with the quarterfinals, followed by the semifinals on March 11, and the finals on March 15. The champions, St. Francis Brooklyn, earned a trip to the 2015 NCAA tournament.

== Bracket ==
Quarterfinals; Sunday, March 8 NEC Front Row
1	Central Connecticut	72
8	LIU Brooklyn	51
4	Sacred Heart	59
5	St. Francis Brooklyn	77
(Pairings are reseeded after the first round)
2	Bryant	76
7	Mount Saint Mary's	54
3	Robert Morris	89
6	Fairleigh Dickinson	61

Semifinals; Wednesday, March 11 (reseeded); ESPN3
1	Central Connecticut	63
5	St. Francis Brooklyn	71^{2OT}
2	Bryant	62
3	Robert Morris	68

Championship; Sunday, March 15; ESPNU
5	St. Francis Brooklyn	77
3	Robert Morris	62

All games will be played at the venue of the higher seed

== All-tournament team ==
Tournament MVP in bold.

Name	School
**Sarah Benedetti**	St. Francis Brooklyn
Jaymee Veney	St. Francis Brooklyn
Anna Niki Stamolamprou	Robert Morris
Rebeca Navarro	Robert Morris
Breanna Rucker	Bryant
