= St. Francis College =

Franciscan college in Brooklyn, New York, US

Coordinates: 40°41′35″N 73°59′31″W

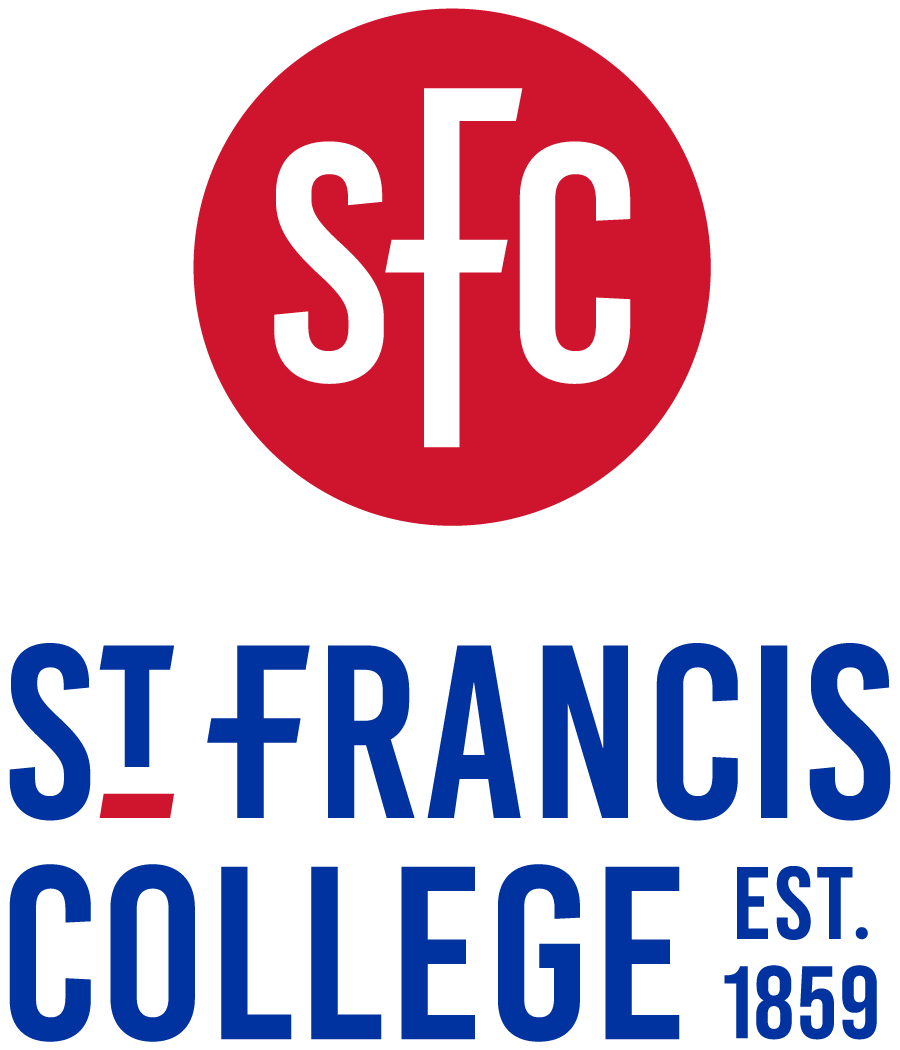
- Former name: St. Francis Academy (1859–1884)
- Motto: Latin: Deus Meus et Omnia
- Motto in English: My God, My All
- Type: Private college
- Established: 1859; 167 years ago
- Religious affiliation: Roman Catholic (Franciscan)
- Academic affiliations: AFCU; ACCU; NAICU; MSA
- Endowment: US$30.757 million (2023)
- President: Tim Cecere
- Provost: John Edwards (acting)
- Faculty: 337
- Students: 4,572 (fall 2024)
- Undergraduates: 1,726 (fall 2024)
- Postgraduates: 2,846 (fall 2024)
- Location: 179 Livingston Street, Downtown Brooklyn (New York, New York), U.S.
- Campus: Urban
- Colors: Blue & red
- Nickname: Terriers
- Sporting affiliations: None
- Website: https://www.sfc.edu/

St. Francis College (St. Francis of Brooklyn or SFC) is a private Franciscan college in Downtown Brooklyn, New York City. It was founded in 1859 by the Franciscan Brothers of Brooklyn as the St. Francis Academy and was the first private school in the Diocese of Brooklyn. St. Francis College began as a parochial all-boys academy in the City of Brooklyn and has become a small liberal arts college that has 19 academic departments offering 72 majors and minors.

St. Francis College is a predominantly undergraduate institution with some graduate programs; it is considered a commuter college. As of 2021, there were 2,372 undergraduates and 117 graduate students.

== History ==
=== Baltic and Butler Street Campus (1884–1963) ===
In 1858, John McMahon and Vincent Hayes, Franciscan priests from the Roundstone Monastery in Ireland came to the United States to begin work on establishing an academy dedicated to educating underprivileged youth in the Brooklyn diocese. This was done at the request of the Bishop of Brooklyn, Reverend John Loughlin. In 1859, St. Francis College was founded as the St. Francis Academy, the first Catholic school in Brooklyn. St. Francis Academy opened in a building on 300 Baltic Street in Cobble Hill, Brooklyn, with 30 students and six Franciscan priests. The first president was John McMahon, one of the founders. The academy expanded and grew to encompass six row houses, with 150 feet (46 m) of frontage, and a former Methodist Church on Baltic Street.

In 1868, the academy was incorporated, and on May 8, 1884, it was chartered: the trustees of the academy received permission from the New York State Legislature to "establish a literary college in the City of Brooklyn under the title of St. Francis College, with the same powers to confer diplomas and literary honors possessed by the universities and colleges of New York State." St. Francis Academy became St. Francis College and, in June 1885, bestowed its first Bachelor of Arts degree. By 1884, St. Francis College encompassed interconnected buildings that were on Baltic and Butler Streets, between Court and Smith Streets. The entrance to the college was on Baltic Street, and the entrance to the monastery on Butler Street. In June 1892, the college conferred it first Bachelor of Science degree. In 1896, St. Francis fielded the first collegiate men's basketball team in New York City. Then, in May 1902, St. Francis received its charter from the State of New York. From this time on, the college's curriculum offered only a post-secondary course of study. By 1917, the college's enrollment dropped to half, due to students enlisting in the military as the United States entered World War I. In 1926, the Franciscan Brothers opened a new facility on Butler Street, after raising US$250,000 through a fundraising campaign dubbed the "Great Drive." About 10 years later, its preparatory school moved out and eventually became a legally separate institution, St. Francis Preparatory School, which is located in Queens.

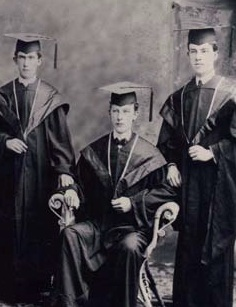
Photograph of St. Francis College graduates, circa 1899

As the U.S. moved closer to its entrance into World War II, 240 students were enrolled at St. Francis. While the student body remained mostly Irish, the changing demographics of working-class Brooklyn were reflected in the growing number of Italian-American students. By the spring semester of 1944, when the war was at its peak, the number of students enrolled had dropped to 45. Most of those still enrolled were members of the Franciscan order and those exempt from military service (12 SFC students gave their lives to the war effort). After the War and with the passage of the G.I. Bill, which paid tuition for returning soldiers, enrollment at St. Francis increased to 878 students. In 1957, the Regents of the University of the State of New York granted an absolute charter to the trustees of the college, making it a separate legal entity from the St. Francis Monastery. The new corporate status enabled St. Francis students to qualify for federal financial aid. Shortly after, in 1959, the Middle States Commission on Higher Education accredited St. Francis College. After these developments, the college embarked on an expansion program. In 1960, it was announced that five office buildings in the Brooklyn Civic Center were purchased for $5 million from the Brooklyn Union Gas Company. In 1961, the college purchased the Herman Behr Mansion in Brooklyn Heights to serve as a residence for the Franciscan Brothers, signaling the move from Cobble Hill to Brooklyn Heights.

=== Remsen Street Campus (1963–2022) ===
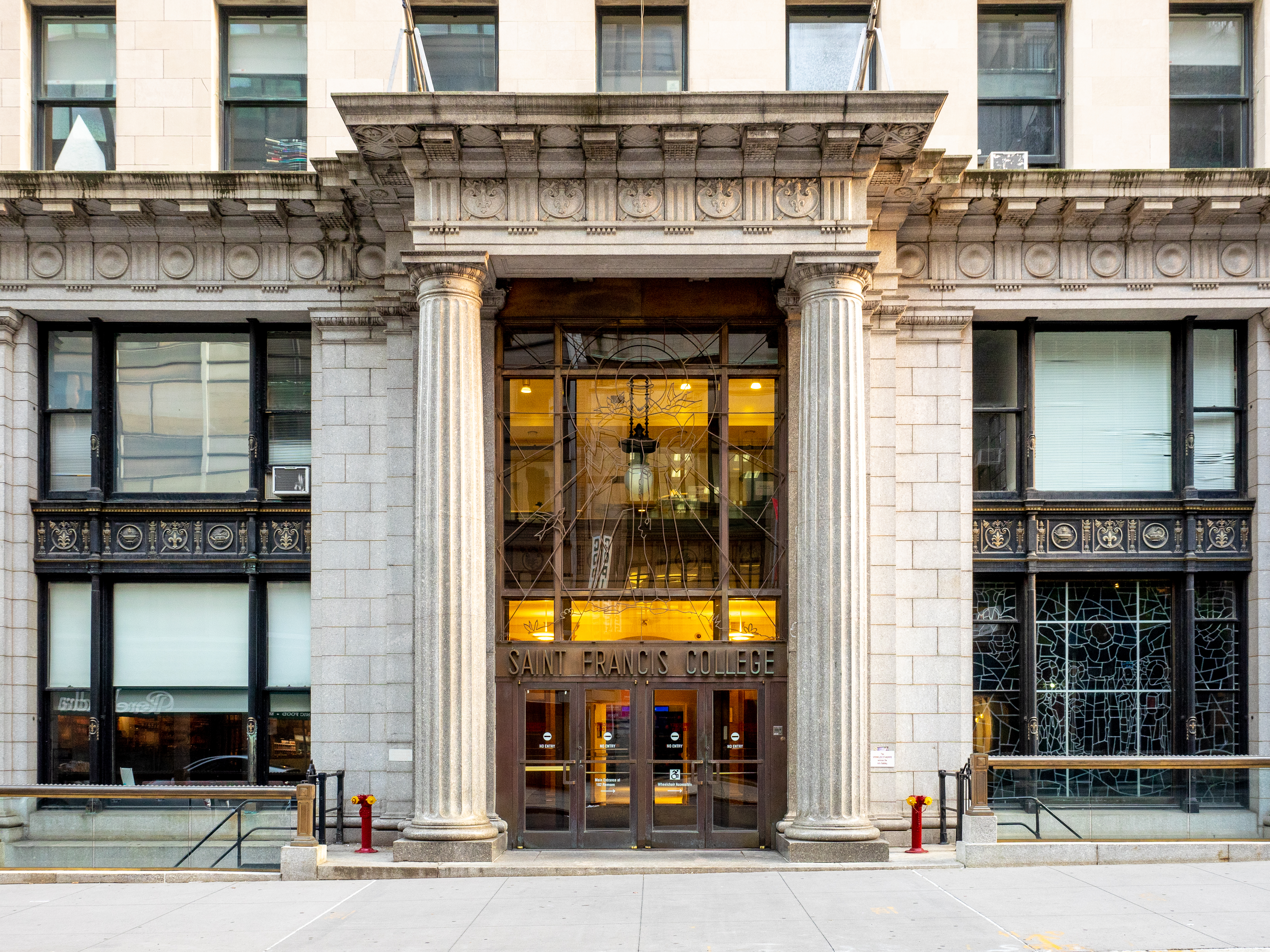
SFC's Administration Building at its former campus at 176 Remsen Street in Brooklyn Heights

In 1963, the college relocated to Remsen Street in Brooklyn Heights, where it had purchased five office buildings from the Brooklyn Union Gas Company, allowing it to double its enrollment. One of the office buildings, at 176 Remsen Street, became SFC's Administration Building; that structure was constructed in 1914 by Brooklyn architect Frank Freeman. The college started the expansion of its facilities with the construction of the Science and Technology Building in 1968, the Generoso Pope Athletic Complex in 1971, and the Student Services Building, which also had housing to accommodate the Franciscan Brothers and provided space for faculty. In 1969, the college became a co-educational institution, and additional property was purchased on both Remsen and Joralemon Streets, allowing enrollment to exceed 3,000 students.

In 2003, St. Francis College completed a new athletic and event facility atop the college's basketball court: the Anthony J. Genovesi Center. In fall 2005, the 35,000-square-foot (3,300 m^{2}) Frank and Mary Macchiarola Academic Center opened, which included the new St. Francis College Library, classrooms equipped with wireless internet access, smart boards, and multimedia technology, a theater/lecture hall, updated facilities for the Communication Arts department, gathering spaces such as a lounge with Wi-Fi for students, and office space for several academic departments. The Frank and Mary Macchiarola Academic Center was built where the old McGarry Library once stood. The old library was housed in "a little 1857 palazzo a half-block from Brooklyn's Borough Hall" and was part of the original purchase made from the Brooklyn Union Gas Company in 1960.

=== Livingston Street Campus (2022–present) ===
In the summer of 2022, after nearly 60 years at Remsen Street, St. Francis College moved to a new facility at 179 Livingston Street in Downtown Brooklyn. Key features of the new campus include a 260-seat cafeteria; a 50-seat outdoor terrace for use by SFC students, faculty, and staff; a 38-seat chapel; a 300-seat auditorium; a 32-seat tiered screening room; a 6,600-square-foot library; two art galleries; and space for student gatherings.

== Campus ==
St. Francis College is located at 179 Livingston Street, in Downtown Brooklyn, and encompasses three floors in the Wheeler Building, a building atop the Macy's department store. St. Francis College has one dedicated dormitory for its students, consisting of single-, double- and triple-occupancy rooms.

== Academics ==
St. Francis College confers associate degrees, bachelor's degrees, and master's degrees. In addition to these degrees, the college grants certifications for teaching and nursing. Affiliation agreements with the SUNY Downstate Medical Center, New York University College of Dentistry, and New York College of Podiatric Medicine enable students to pursue degrees toward becoming physician assistants, radiologists, and physical or occupational therapists and to acquire advanced standing in professional programs in dentistry and podiatry before the completion of the baccalaureate degree. For students who excel academically and participate in extracurricular activities that embody the "Franciscan spirit," St. Francis College established the Duns Scotus Honor Society. It was founded in 1935 by Rev. James A. Sullivan and is named for John Duns Scotus, a Franciscan scholar.

=== Graduate programs ===
St. Francis has five graduate programs: a five-year combined bachelor's and master's degree in accounting and in psychology; a two-year accounting master's program; a master's program in psychology; a master's program in management; and a 2.5-year low residency in creative writing (MFA). In 2007, the college added the combined B.S./M.S. degree in accounting. The first students graduated from the program in 2008, on the college's 150th anniversary. In 2010, the college added the second graduate degree, a two-year master's degree in Professional Accountancy. In 2012, a combined B.S./M.S. degree in Psychology was added that offers two concentrations, one in Applied Psychology and another in Psychology Research. Also in 2012, the Graduate Certificate in Project Management was launched. In 2017, the Master of Fine Arts in Creative Writing program was launched.

=== Institutes and centers ===
St. Francis College hosts several institutes and centers, including the Center for Entrepreneurship, the Institute for International and Cross-Cultural Psychology, the Women's Studies Center, the Center of Excellence in Project Management, and the Center for Crime and Popular Culture.

==== Women's Studies Center ====
The Center for Women's and Gender Studies opened in 1997. St. Francis College offers a Women's Studies minor.

==== Institute for International and Cross-Cultural Psychology ====
The Institute for International and Cross-Cultural Psychology (IICCP) was founded in 1998. It has become a center for the advancement of cross-cultural psychology and international psychology. It is supported by an international advisory board of psychologists from six countries. Members of the institute have engaged in a series of research projects, edited books, sponsored conferences, and introduced novel curriculum development. The institute has supported the writing and editing of numerous publications in international psychology, including 17 books in five countries.

==== Center of Excellence in Project Management ====
The Center of Excellence in Project Management launched in 2011 and held its first annual Practical Research Forum on June 6, 2011, a series of lectures combining academic theory and real-world project-management experiences.

=== Rankings ===
Academic rankings

Baccalaureate
- Washington Monthly: 58

Regional
- U.S. News & World Report: 13

National
- Forbes: 625

St. Francis College has been considered by U.S. News & World Report as a Tier 1 Baccalaureate College and its ranking has ranged from 9th to 29th.

== Demographics ==
The total enrollment at St. Francis College is 2,489, of which 38% are male and 62% are female. St. Francis College has been ranked by The New York Times as one of the more diverse colleges in the United States. 85% of students enrolled are below the age of 24. Below is the 2020 enrollment data for St. Francis College by race and ethnicity.

- American Indian or Alaskan Native: 1%
- Asian or Pacific Islander: 4%
- Black non-Hispanic: 24%
- Hispanic: 28%
- Native Hawaiian or other Pacific Islander: 1%
- White non-Hispanic: 26%
- Two or more races: 3%
- Race/ethnicity unknown: 4%
- Non-resident immigrant: 9%

In 2020, St. Francis College welcomed its largest ever freshman class, with 747 students.

== Athletics ==
Wordmark logo for the St. Francis Brooklyn Terriers.

Prior to 2023, St. Francis competed in the NCAA's Northeast Conference. Their mascot is the Terrier and was officially adopted by the Athletic Association in 1933. Students participated on 21 Division I athletic teams. On March 20, 2023 St. Francis announced that they would drop athletics after the Spring 2023 semester.

Several teams played at off-campus facilities. These include: the soccer teams, which played at Brooklyn Bridge Park Pier 5; the outdoor track team, which competed at Icahn Stadium; the indoor track team, which competed at the New Balance Track & Field Center; the golf team, which played at the Dyker Beach Golf Course; and the tennis team, which played at the USTA National Tennis Center.

=== Basketball ===
The St. Francis College men's basketball team, founded in 1896, was the oldest collegiate program in New York City. In the Terriers' 117-year history, they won six regular season championships, had four postseason NIT bids, and one postseason CIT bid. The Terrier's had their best season in 1955–56 under head coach Daniel Lynch, they posted a 21–4 record that ranked them 13th nationally in the AP polls and reached the NIT semi-finals. Then, during Ron Ganulin's tenure as head coach in the late 1990s and early 2000s, the team was one of the best in the NEC; from 1998 through 2004, St. Francis posted a 78–36 conference record. At the time Ganulin's assistant was Glenn Braica, who held the position from 2010 to 2023. Under Braica, the Terriers won the 2014–15 NEC Regular Season Championship and participated in the 2015 NIT and the 2019 CIT.

The St. Francis Brooklyn Terriers women's basketball kicked off intercollegiate athletics at St. Francis College in 1973. Since the 1988–89 season the women's basketball team was a member of the Northeast Conference. The Terrier's had their best season in 2014–15 under John Thurston by winning the NEC Tournament Championship and receiving the program's first NCAA bid. Also under Thurston, the 2013–14 squad set the single-season program record with 19 victories.

=== Soccer ===
The SFC men's soccer team was founded in 1968 and joined the Northeast Conference in 1985. In their history, the Terriers have won 5 NEC Regular Season Championships and 8 NEC Tournament Championships. Their 8 Tournament Championships are the most in the conference. The Terriers have also participated in nine NCAA tournaments, their best showing came in 1978 when they made it to the Elite Eight and were ranked 6th nationally. Since joining the NEC, the Terriers have had NCAA Tournament Play-in games on three occasions ('95, '96 and '98) and four NCAA Tournament appearances (2013, 2014, 2016, 2017). In the 2015 season, the Terriers were nationally ranked at 22nd in the country.

=== Water polo ===
The St. Francis College men's water polo team has enjoyed much success and is one of the best teams on the east coast. In consecutive years from 2004 to 2008, they won the Eastern College Athletic Conference Championships and the CWPA Northern Division Championships. The Terriers have finished between 1st and forth in the Eastern Championships from 1999 to 2007. In 2005, they finished first and qualified for the NCAA National Championships and finished forth at the Final Four. In 2010, the Terriers made it to the Final Four, finishing fourth and were ranked 10th in the country. In 2012, the men's water polo team won the Eastern Championship for the third time in the program's history and earned an NCAA Final Four berth. The Terriers also went on to defeat Air Force to win their first national tournament match for a third-place finish. In 2013, the Terriers won the Eastern Championship for the fourth time in the program's history and earned an NCAA Final Four berth, finishing 4th.

== Notable alumni ==
The St. Francis College Alumni Association was founded in 1887.

== Popular culture ==
Different locations at St. Francis College's former campus in Brooklyn Heights were used as backdrops for various scenes for film and television. The Aquatic Center's pool was used to film scenes for the movie Across the Universe (2007) and the HBO comedy series Flight of the Conchords. The Peter Aquilone Court has been used for filming by the Late Show with David Letterman and The Today Show. The Thomas J. and Anita Volpe Lounge was used by the popular TV show Gossip Girl to film scenes for Season 4, Episode 10: Gaslit.
