= Generoso Pope Athletic Complex =

Multi-purpose arena in Brooklyn, New York

- The Pope
- Interactive map of Generoso Pope Athletic Complex
- Former names: Pope Physical Education Center
- Location: 180 Remsen Street; Brooklyn, New York 11201
- Coordinates: 40°41′35.33″N 73°59′31.79″W
- Operator: St. Francis College
- Capacity: 1,200 (Daniel Lynch Gymnasium)

Construction
- Opened: 1971
- Expanded: October 10, 2003 (9,000 sqft Genovesi Center)
- Cost: US$6,000,000 (Genovesi Center)

Tenant
- St. Francis Brooklyn Terriers

The Generoso Pope Athletic Complex, also known as The Pope, is a multi-purpose indoor arena in the New York City borough of Brooklyn. It is located on Remsen Street, between Court and Clinton Streets, within the St. Francis College campus. The Pope is named after Generoso Pope, an Italian immigrant who rose to prominence in New York City through his entrepreneurship and charity.

The Pope is composed of three levels, on the lower level is the Aquatics Center, above it is the Daniel Lynch Gymnasium and on top is the Genovesi Center. Each level hosts different NCAA Division I sports for St. Francis College and nine of its twenty-one teams call The Pope home. As such, The Pope is the core of St. Francis College's athletic facilities.

== Basketball teams ==
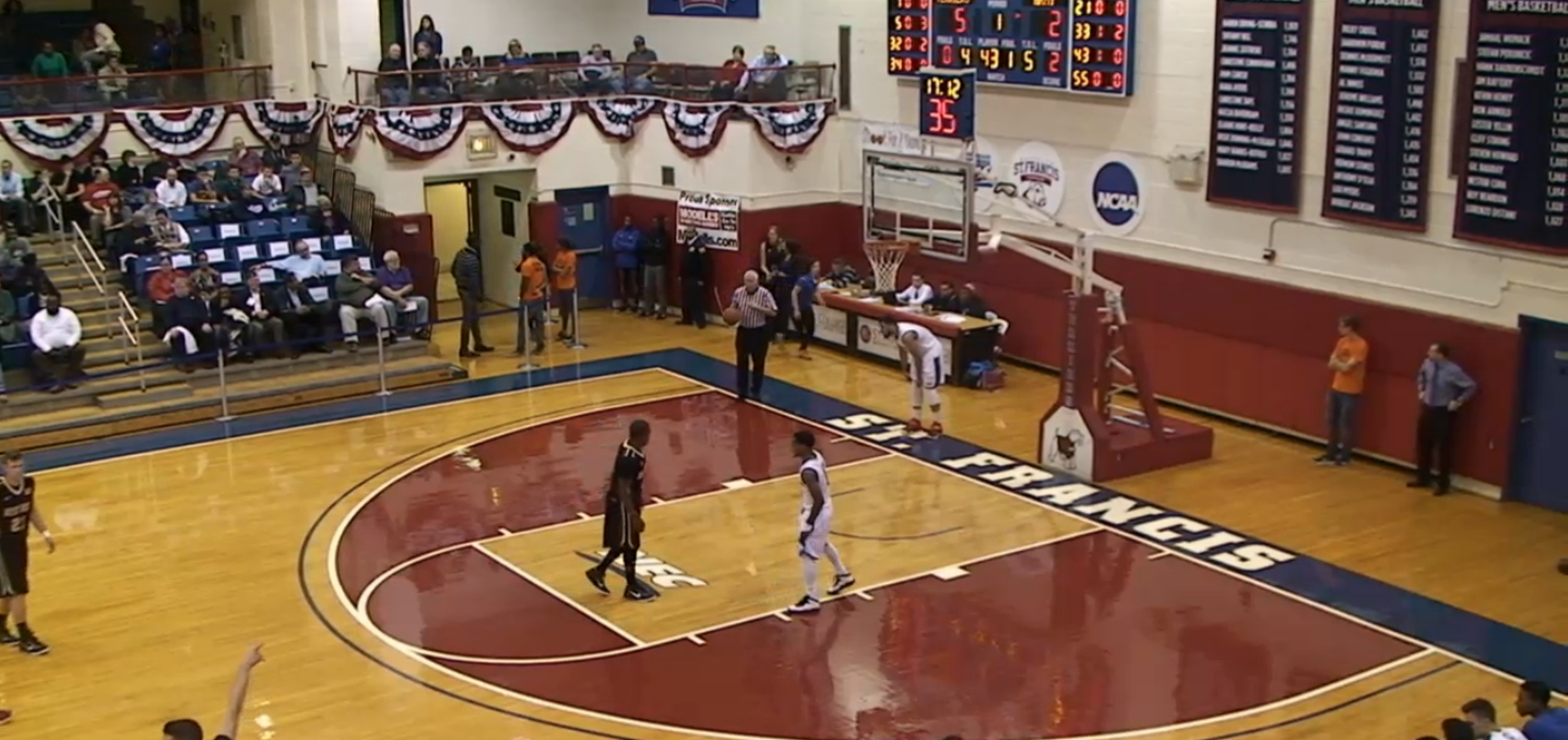
Terriers vs Army Black Knights at The Pope on November 19, 2014.

The Daniel Lynch Gymnasium is the centerpiece of The Pope and it hosts the NCAA Division I Men's and Women's Basketball teams games. The Gymnasium has a capacity of 1,200 seats and hosts nationally and regionally televised games. It has one of the smallest capacities in Division I basketball and is the smallest in the Northeast Conference. For the 2014-15 men's basketball season, total attendance was 18,882 across 17 games for an average of 1,111 per game.

The Gymnasium is named after alumnus Daniel J. Lynch, who coached the Terriers for 21 years and led them to 3 Regular Season Conference Championship wins and is the All-Time Terrier Coach wins leader. The teams play on Peter Aquilone Court, which was named after Peter Aquilone, the son of former athletic director and St. Francis alumnus Edward Aquilone, ’60. The court was dedicated to Peter Aquilone on December 1, 2004, posthumously.

In 2018, the Terriers unveiled a new hardwood basketball floor. The new court replaces the original one that was installed in 1969.

== Water polo, swimming and diving teams ==
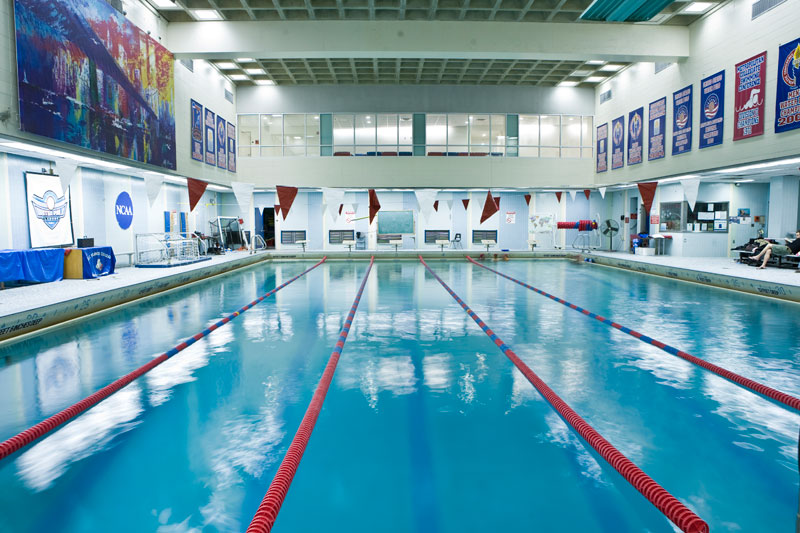
St. Francis Aquatics Center

The Aquatics Center has a competition-sized pool (six-lanes by 25-yards). It is home to the nationally ranked Men's Water Polo team which has three NCAA Final Four appearances, the Women's Water Polo Team and home meets for the college's Swimming and Diving Teams. During the off season and away games the pool is open to all students and is also used by the surrounding community.

== Volleyball team ==
The Genovesi Center is a recent 9,000-square-foot (840 m^{2}) addition to The Pope and was built on top of the Daniel Lynch Gymnasium in 2003. The Genovesi Center was named for former state Assemblyman Anthony J. Genovesi. The Genovesi Center hosts the Terriers men's and women's volleyball games and is regularly used for intramural games.

== Popular culture ==
Different locations at The Pope have been used for backdrops to various scenes for film and television. The pool has been used to film scenes for the movie Across the Universe (2007) and the HBO comedy series Flight of the Conchords. The Peter Aquilone Court has been used for filming by the Late Show with David Letterman and The Today Show.

In 2011, attending a Terriers game was named one reason to love New York by New York Magazine in their seventh annual Reasons to Love New York 2011 piece.

== See also ==
- List of NCAA Division I basketball arenas
