= Amanda Levens =

American basketball player and coach

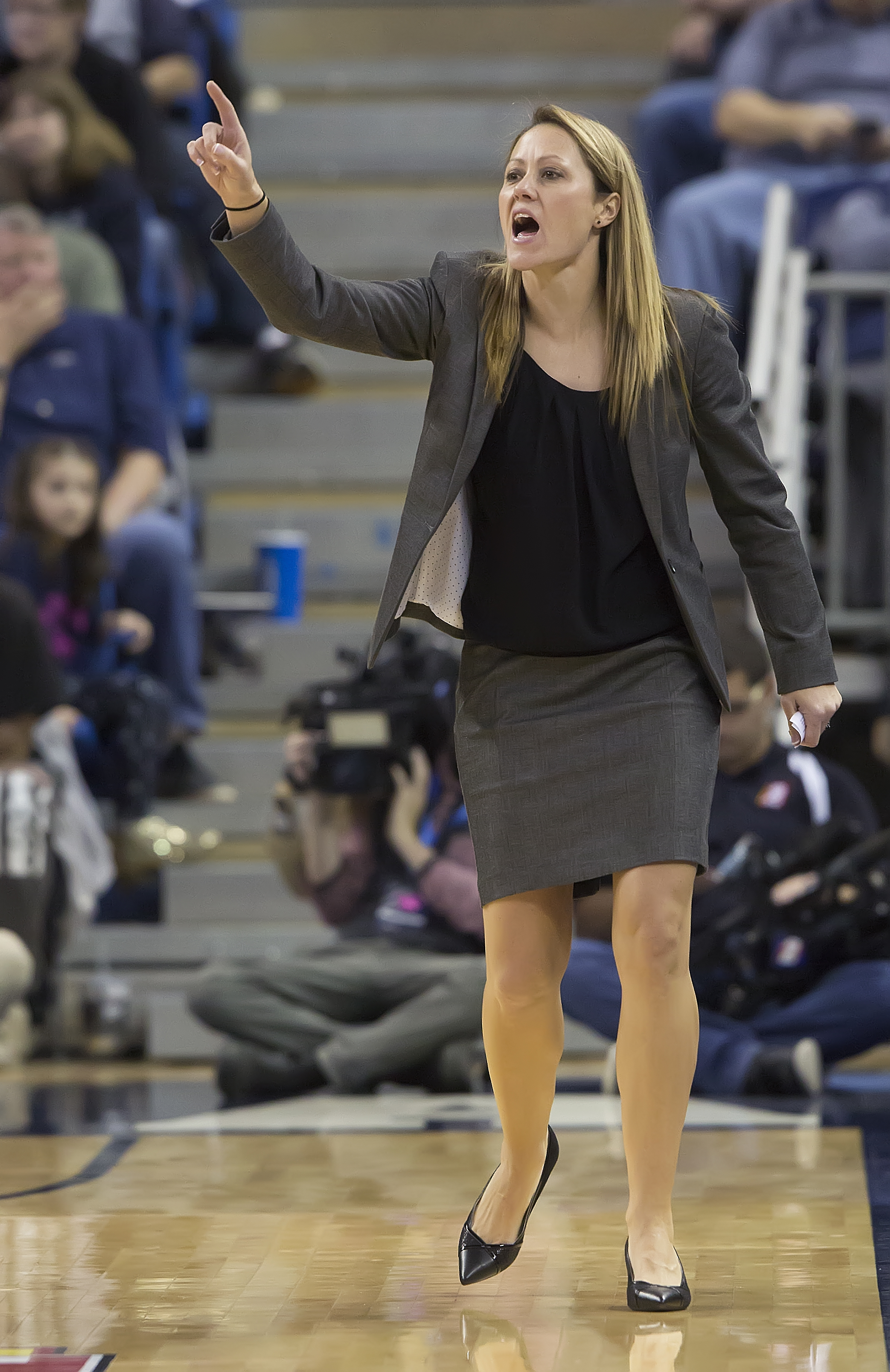
- Levens in 2017

Biographical details
- Born: January 24, 1979 (age 47); Belvidere, Illinois, U.S.

Playing career
- 1997–1999: Old Dominion
- 2000–2002: Arizona State
- Position: Guard

Coaching career (HC unless noted)
- 2003–2008: Nevada (asst.)
- 2008–2012: SIU Edwardsville
- 2012–2017: Arizona State (assoc. HC)
- 2017–2026: Nevada

Head coaching record
- Overall: 168–229 (.423)
- Tournaments: 3–4 (WBI)

Accomplishments and honors

Awards
- As a player: 2x All Pac-10 (2001, 2002)

Amanda Kay Levens (born January 24, 1979) is an American women's college basketball coach. She was the head coach at the University of Nevada. Previously, she was hired as head coach at Southern Illinois University Edwardsville (SIUE) in 2008, when the school began a five-year transition to the NCAA's Division I. From 2012 to 2017, she was associate head coach at Arizona State before being hired at Nevada as head coach.

== Early life and education ==
Born in Belvidere, Illinois, Levens graduated from Belvidere High School in 1997. At Belvidere High, she was a three-time All State and Amateur Athletic Union All-American honoree in basketball.

In the fall of 1997, Levens enrolled at Old Dominion University and began playing at point guard for the Old Dominion Monarchs. In her first season in 1997–98, Levens played in 29 games and averaged 3.1 points as Old Dominion made a run to the Sweet 16 round of the 1998 NCAA tournament. Then in 1998–99, Levens started 23 of 32 games, averaging 21.0 minutes and 6.7 points. Old Dominion made a second straight Sweet 16 appearance in the 1999 NCAA Tournament.

After two seasons at Old Dominion, Levens transferred to Arizona State University, where she was a star member of the Sun Devils. At Arizona State, she broke the school's season records for most three-point shots made, with 60 in 2001 and free throws, with 167 in 2002. In her Arizona State career, Levens scored 1,020 points, an average of 15.9 points per game; dished out 240 assists, a 3.8 per game average; and recovered 218 rebounds for 3.4 per game. In both seasons at ASU, she was a member of the All Pac-10 First Team, and she received an honorable mention on the 2002 Associated Press All-America Team. After graduating from Arizona State with a bachelor's degree in history, Levens signed a free agent contract with the Charlotte Sting of the Women's National Basketball Association, but she was released before the regular season began. In 2007 she earned her master's degree in educational leadership from Nevada.

=== College playing statistics ===
Legend
GP	Games played	GS	Games started	MPG	Minutes per game
FG%	Field goal percentage	3P%	3-point field goal percentage	FT%	Free throw percentage
RPG	Rebounds per game	APG	Assists per game	SPG	Steals per game
BPG	Blocks per game	PPG	Points per game	**Bold**	Career high

Year	Team	GP	Points	FG%	3P%	FT%	RPG	APG	SPG	BPG	PPG
1997–98	Old Dominion University	29	89	38.2%	34.6%	79.2%	0.9	0.4	0.3	0.1	3.1
1998–99	Old Dominion University	32	213	37.9%	29.4%	76.3%	2.0	2.5	1.1	0.0	6.7
1999–00	Arizona State	Did not play due to NCAA transfer rules									
2000–01	Arizona State	31	470	38.2%	**41.4%**	**79.8%**	**3.4**	3.1	0.8	**0.1**	15.2
2001–02	Arizona State	**33**	**550**	**38.4%**	35.0%	77.3%	3.4	**4.4**	**0.9**	–	**16.7**
Career		125	1,322	38.2%	36.3%	78.1%	2.5	2.7	0.8	0.0	10.6

== Coaching career ==
=== Nevada assistant (2003–2008) ===
From 2003 to 2008, Levens was an assistant coach for the women's basketball program headed by Kim Gervasoni at the University of Nevada.

=== SIU Edwardsville (2008–2012) ===
In April 2008, she was selected as the fourth head coach of the SIU Edwardsville Cougars. SIUE joined the Ohio Valley Conference (OVC) in 2008 and played its first full conference schedule in the 2011–12 season. Prior to that first season, Leven's Cougars were picked by the league's coaches to finish eighth of the eleven teams. After SIUE finished the season in third place, with a conference record of 12 wins and 4 losses, Levens was named the 2012 Ohio Valley Conference Women's Basketball Coach of the Year. Although the Cougars would not be eligible for OVC or NCAA post-season competition until the 2012–13 season, they were invited to play in the 2012 Women's Basketball Invitational (WBI) tournament.

=== Arizona State assistant (2012–2017) ===
On April 20, 2012, Levens returned to Arizona State as associate head coach under Charli Turner Thorne. During her five-year tenure as the top assistant, Arizona State appeared in the Sweet 16 of the 2015 NCAA tournament and won the 2015–16 Pac-12 Conference regular season title.

=== Nevada (2017–2026) ===
On March 31, 2017, Levens returned to Nevada to be head coach, following the retirement of Jane Albright.

Inheriting a team that finished 11–19 the previous season, Levens led Nevada to a 19–17 record and appearance in the 2018 Women's Basketball Invitational semifinals. The 19 wins were the most for any Nevada first-year head coach in program history. However, with an inexperienced roster with six freshmen and only four experienced returning players, Nevada went 12–19 in 2018–19.

In 2019–20, Nevada improved to 15–16. Then in 2020–21, with the season shortened due to the COVID-19 pandemic, Nevada finished 13–9, including a 9–7 record and fifth place finish in the Mountain West Conference standings, the best under Levens. Nevada improved further in 2021–22 with a 20–13 record, including 11–6 in Mountain West games for a third place tie in conference standings, and an appearance in the 2022 Women's Basketball Invitational third place game.

However, the 2022–23 Nevada team had just half as many wins at 10–21, finishing eighth in the Mountain West standings at 6–12 in conference play.

== Personal life ==
In 2015, Levens adopted two boys, aged four and three at the time. Levens married Ashley Elliott, an assistant coach on her staff, in 2019.

== Head coaching record ==
Record table
Season	Team	Overall	Conference	Standing	Postseason
SIU Edwardsville Cougars (NCAA Division I independent) (2008–2011)
2008–09	SIU Edwardsville	5–24			
2009–10	SIU Edwardsville	8–21			
2010–11	SIU Edwardsville	11–19			
SIU Edwardsville Cougars (Ohio Valley Conference) (2011–2012)
2011–12	SIU Edwardsville	18–12	12–4	3rd	WBI First Round
SIU Edwardsville:		42–76 (.356)	12–4 (.750)		
Nevada Wolf Pack (Mountain West Conference) (2017–2026)
2017–18	Nevada	19–17	7–11	7th	WBI Semifinal
2018–19	Nevada	12–19	7–11	T–7th	
2019–20	Nevada	15–16	7–11	T–7th	
2020–21	Nevada	13–9	9–7	5th	
2021–22	Nevada	20–13	11–6	T–3rd	WBI Third Place
2022–23	Nevada	10–21	6–12	8th	
2023–24	Nevada	16–16	10–8	T–4th	
2024–25	Nevada	11–21	6–12	9th	
2025–26	Nevada	10–21	6–14	10th	
Nevada:		126–153 (.452)	63–80 (.441)		
Total:		168–229 (.423)			
