= Kathy Olivier =

American college basketball coach (born 1959)

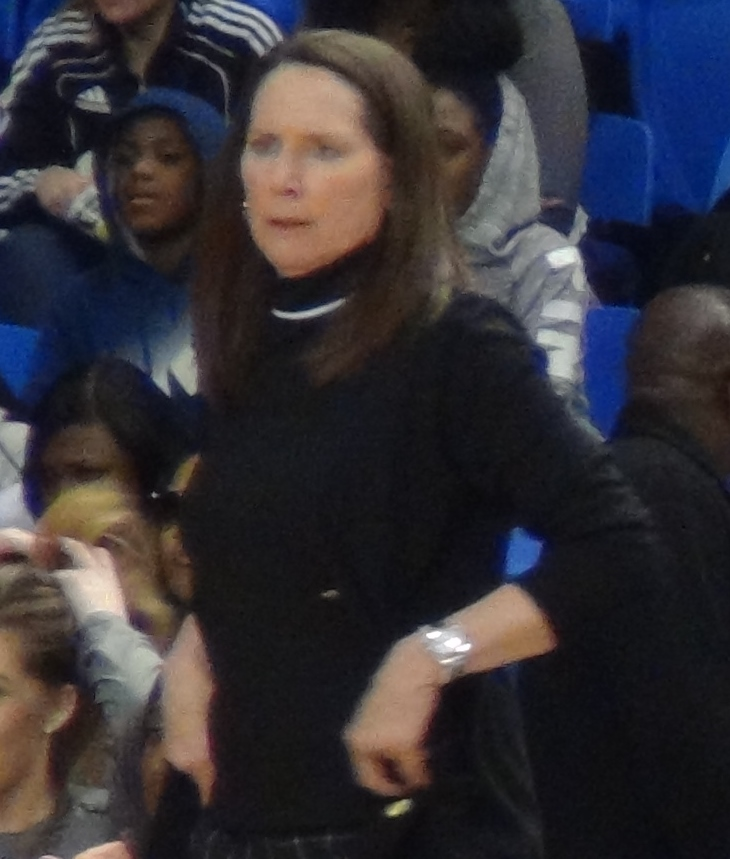
- Olivier in 2017 during a game at San Jose State.

Biographical details
- Born: November 6, 1959 (age 66); Los Angeles County, California, U.S.

Playing career
- 1977–1979: Cal State Fullerton
- 1979–1981: UNLV
- Position: Forward

Coaching career (HC unless noted)
- 1981–1982: UNLV (GA)
- 1982–1983: UC Irvine (asst.)
- 1983–1986: USC (asst.)
- 1986–1993: UCLA (asst.)
- 1993–2008: UCLA
- 2008–2020: UNLV

Head coaching record
- Overall: 414–401 (.508)
- Tournaments: 5–5 (NCAA); 0–3 (WNIT)

Accomplishments and honors

Championships
- As head coach: Pac-10 regular season (1999); Pac-10 Tournament (2006); As assistant coach: NCAA Division I (1984)

Awards
- As player: Honorable mention All-American (1980)

Katherine Ann Olivier (née Ricks; born November 6, 1959) is an American college basketball coach who most recently was the women's basketball head coach at UNLV. She resigned from that position on March 6, 2020.

== Early life and education ==
Born Katherine Ann Ricks in Los Angeles County, Olivier graduated from Valencia High School in Placentia, California in 1977. As Kathy Ricks, Olivier played collegiate basketball and tennis at Cal State Fullerton from 1977 to 1979 and UNLV basketball from 1979 to 1981. She was the leading scorer in both her seasons at Cal State Fullerton, averaging 15.6 points and 9.2 rebounds as a freshman and 19.3 points and 7.7 rebounds as a sophomore. At UNLV, Olivier earned honorable mention All-America honors in 1980 after a junior season averaging 16.3 points and 5.7 rebounds. In her fourth consecutive year as her team's leading scorer, Olivier averaged 20.2 points and 9.2 rebounds as a senior in 1980–81. Olivier graduated from UNLV in 1981 with a degree in physical education.

== Coaching career ==
=== Assistant coach (1981–1993) ===
Olivier began her coaching career in 1981 as a graduate assistant at UNLV, followed by a season as an assistant coach at UC Irvine in 1982–83.

From 1983 to 1986, Olivier was an assistant coach at USC under Linda Sharp, including USC's 1984 national championship team.

Olivier moved to rival UCLA as an assistant coach under Billie Moore in 1986. In seven seasons with Olivier on the staff, UCLA had five winning seasons and two NCAA Tournament appearances, including a run to the Sweet 16 in 1992.

=== UCLA (1993–2008) ===
Following Moore's resignation, UCLA promoted Olivier to head coach on May 3, 1993. In 15 seasons at UCLA, Olivier went 232–208, with the program's first Pac-10 regular season title in 1999 and first Pac-10 Tournament title in 2006. UCLA made five NCAA Tournaments (1998–2000, 2004, 2006), with its most successful run being to the Elite Eight in 1999. Following a 16–15 season, Olivier resigned from UCLA on March 11, 2008.

=== UNLV (2008–2020) ===
Returning to her alma mater, Olivier became women's basketball head coach at UNLV on April 22, 2008. After losing records for the first three seasons, UNLV went 22–10 in 2011–12 with a second place finish in the Mountain West Conference and WNIT appearance. Since the 2011–12 season, UNLV has always had .500 or better records in Mountain West play, but UNLV's next season with an overall winning record was in 2015–16 with an 18–14 finish. In 2016–17, UNLV had its second straight winning overall season at 22–11 (12–6 MW) and made the WNIT for its second postseason appearance under Olivier.
After 12 years as UNLV head coach, Olivier resigned as head coach on March 6, 2020.

== Head coaching record ==
Record table
Season	Team	Overall	Conference	Standing	Postseason
UCLA Bruins (Pac-10 Conference) (1993–2008)
1993–94	UCLA	15–12	10–8	5th	
1994–95	UCLA	10–17	5–13	T–8th	
1995–96	UCLA	13–14	8–10	T–6th	
1996–97	UCLA	13–14	7–11	6th	
1997–98	UCLA	20–9	14–4	T–2nd	NCAA second round
1998–99	UCLA	26–8	15–3	T–1st	NCAA Elite Eight
1999–2000	UCLA	18–11	12–6	4th	NCAA First Round
2000–01	UCLA	6–23	5–13	10th	
2001–02	UCLA	9–20	4–14	8th	
2002–03	UCLA	18–11	12–6	4th	
2003–04	UCLA	17–13	11–7	T–3rd	NCAA first round
2004–05	UCLA	16–12	10–8	6th	
2005–06	UCLA	21–11	12–6	3rd	NCAA second round
2006–07	UCLA	14–18	7–11	7th	
2007–08	UCLA	16–15	10–8	T–4th	
UCLA:		232–208 (.527)	142–128 (.526)		
UNLV Lady Rebels (Mountain West Conference) (2008–2020)
2008–09	UNLV	14–18	5–11	7th	
2009–10	UNLV	13–18	6–10	7th	
2010–11	UNLV	11–20	4–12	8th	
2011–12	UNLV	22–10	10–4	2nd	WNIT First Round
2012–13	UNLV	12–19	8–8	T–4th	
2013–14	UNLV	13–19	9–9	T–6th	
2014–15	UNLV	13–17	10–8	T–5th	
2015–16	UNLV	18–14	9–9	T–5th	
2016–17	UNLV	22–10	12–6	T–3rd	WNIT First Round
2017–18	UNLV	19–12	14–4	T–1st	WNIT First Round
2018–19	UNLV	12–18	10–8	T-5th	
2019–20	UNLV	13–17	9–9	T-5th	
UNLV:		182–193 (.485)	106–99 (.517)		
Total:		414–401 (.508)			
National champion Postseason invitational champion Conference regular season champion Conference regular season and conference tournament champion Division regular season champion Division regular season and conference tournament champion Conference tournament champion

== Personal life ==
Olivier has a daughter, Alexis, and coached her at UCLA from 2006 to 2008. She was previously married to chemical engineer Jim Olivier.
