= 2017–18 Colorado State Rams women's basketball team =

Intercollegiate basketball season

2017–18 Colorado State Rams women's basketball

WNIT, Second Round
- Conference: Mountain West Conference
- Record: 21–12 (11–7 Mountain West)
- Head coach: Ryun Williams (6th season)
- Assistant coaches: Tim Moser; Carissa Theilbar; Amber Cunningham
- Home arena: Moby Arena

2017–18 Mountain West Conference women's basketball standings
	Conf.				Overall
Team	W		L	PCT	W		L	PCT
Boise State †	14	–	4	.778	23	–	10	.697
UNLV	14	–	4	.778	19	–	12	.613
Wyoming	13	–	5	.722	22	–	11	.667
Colorado State	11	–	7	.611	21	–	12	.636
Fresno State	11	–	7	.611	17	–	15	.531
New Mexico	10	–	8	.556	25	–	11	.694
Nevada	7	–	11	.389	19	–	17	.528
San Diego State	5	–	13	.278	11	–	19	.367
Utah State	5	–	13	.278	7	–	23	.233
Air Force	5	–	13	.278	6	–	25	.194
San Jose State	4	–	14	.222	7	–	23	.233
† 2018 MW Tournament winner Rankings from AP poll

The 2017–18 Colorado State Rams women's basketball team represented Colorado State University in the 2017–18 NCAA Division I women's basketball season. The Rams, led by sixth year head coach Ryun Williams, played their home games at Moby Arena, and were members of the Mountain West Conference. They finished the season 21–12, 11–7 in Mountain West play to finish in a tie for fourth place. They advanced to the semifinals of the Mountain West Conference women's basketball tournament, where they lost to Boise State. They received an at-large bid to the Women's National Invitation Tournament, where they defeated Western Illinois in the first round before losing in to South Dakota in the second round.

== Roster ==
2017–18 Colorado State Rams women's basketball team
Players
Coaches

Pos.	#	Name	Height	Year	Previous school	Hometown
G	1	Nathalie Liden	5 ft 10 in (1.78 m)	So	Lulea Gymnasieskola	Stockholm, SWE
G	2	Stine Aistgulen	5 ft 11 in (1.8 m)	RS Sr	Langhaugen Videregaende	Bergen, NOR
G	4	Jordyn Edwards	5 ft 8 in (1.73 m)	RS Fr	Lynnwood HS	Seattle, WA
G	5	Sofie Tryggedsson	6 ft 0 in (1.83 m)	Jr	Aabyhøj	Aarhus, DNK
G	10	Hannah Tvrdy	5 ft 10 in (1.78 m)	RS Sr	Seward HS; Nebraska	Seward, NE
C	11	Lena Svanholm	6 ft 6 in (1.98 m)	Fr	Horsholm	Horsholm, DNK
G/F	12	Callie Kasier	5 ft 10 in (1.78 m)	Jr	Broomfield HS	Broomfield, CO
F	15	Veronika Mirkovic	6 ft 1 in (1.85 m)	Sr	Sandagymnasiet	Nässjö, SWE
G/F	21	Myanne Hamm	5 ft 11 in (1.8 m)	RS Jr	Poudre HS	Fort Collins, CO
F	22	Lauren Brocke	6 ft 3 in (1.91 m)	Fr	Centennial HS	Boise, ID
G	23	Grace Colaivalu	5 ft 7 in (1.7 m)	RS Fr	Rosemont HS	Sacramento, CA
F	32	Anne Brady	6 ft 1 in (1.85 m)	Fr	Cottonwood HS; Salt Lake CC	Salt Lake City, UT
C	33	Anna Dreimane	6 ft 5 in (1.96 m)	So	Riga State Gymnasium	Riga, LVA
F	34	Liah Davis	6 ft 2 in (1.88 m)	So	Sand Creek	Colorado Springs, CO
F	35	Lore Devos	6 ft 0 in (1.83 m)	Fr	Stedelijk	Kortrijk, BEL

Head coach

- Ryun Williams (South Dakota)

Assistant coach(es)

- Tim Moser (CSU Pueblo)
- Carissa Theilbar (UW–Superior)
- Amber Cunningham (South Dakota)

Legend

- (C) Team captain
- (S) Suspended
- (I) Ineligible
- (W) Walk-on
- Injured
- Current redshirt

Roster

== Schedule ==
Date time, TV	Rank^{#}	Opponent^{#}	Result	Record	Site (attendance) city, state
Exhibition
11/01/2017*; 6:00 pm		UCCS	W 78–60		Moby Arena; Fort Collins, CO
Non-conference regular season
11/10/2017*; 5:30 pm		Idaho	L 69–83	0–1	Moby Arena (1663); Fort Collins, CO
11/13/2017*; 6:00 pm		Gonzaga	W 65–49	1–1	Moby Arena (1,137); Fort Collins, CO
11/16/2017*; 7:00 pm		Eastern New Mexico	W 75–35	2–1	Moby Arena (1,027); Fort Collins, CO
11/21/2017*; 7:00 pm		Oklahoma	L 46–78	2–2	Moby Arena (1,409); Fort Collins, CO
11/25/2017*; 4:00 pm		North Carolina Central	W 85–48	3–2	Moby Arena (1,157); Fort Collins, CO
11/30/2017*; 7:00 pm		at Denver	W 61–56	4–2	Hamilton Gymnasium (321); Denver, CO
12/02/2017*; 2:00 pm		BYU	W 56–54	5–2	Moby Arena (1,297); Fort Collins, CO
12/06/2017*; 7:00 pm		Colorado	L 67–70	5–3	Moby Arena (1,461); Fort Collins, CO
12/10/2017*; 2:00 pm		at Northern Colorado	W 55–44	6–3	Bank of Colorado Arena (986); Greeley, CO
12/18/2017*; 2:00 pm		Prairie View A&M	W 71–59	7–3	Moby Arena (897); Fort Collins, CO
12/21/2017*; 12:00 pm		Morgan State	W 60–44	8–3	Moby Arena (886); Fort Collins, CO
Mountain West regular season
12/28/2017; 7:00 pm		Boise State	L 58–62	8–4 (0–1)	Moby Arena (1,209); Fort Collins, CO
12/30/2017; 2:00 pm		San José State	W 63–48	9–4 (1–1)	Moby Arena (1,153); Fort Collins, CO
01/03/2018; 7:30 pm		at San Diego State	W 65–63	10–4 (2–1)	Viejas Arena (490); San Diego, CA
01/06/2018; 3:00 pm		at Fresno State	L 45–56	10–5 (2–2)	Save Mart Center (2,162); Fresno, CA
01/10/2018; 7:00 pm		Utah State	W 56–45	11–5 (3–2)	Moby Arena (951); Fort Collins, CO
01/13/2018; 2:00 pm		Wyoming; Border War	L 49–53	11–6 (3–3)	Moby Arena (2,678); Fort Collins, CO
01/17/2018; 7:00 pm		at Air Force	W 40–39	12–6 (4–3)	Clune Arena (323); Colorado Springs, CO
01/20/2018; 4:00 pm		at UNLV	L 52–56	12–7 (4–4)	Cox Pavilion (1,358); Paradise, NV
01/24/2018; 7:00 pm		San Diego State	W 72–43	13–7 (5–4)	Moby Arena (1,175); Fort Collins, CO
01/27/2018; 7:00 pm		New Mexico	W 74–71 ^{OT}	14–7 (6–4)	Moby Arena (1,624); Fort Collins, CO
01/31/2018; 6:30 pm		Wyoming; Border War	W 64–53	15–7 (7–4)	Arena-Auditorium (3,158); Laramie, WY
02/03/2018; 3:00 pm		at Nevada	W 65–59	16–7 (8–4)	Lawlor Events Center (1,467); Reno, NV
02/07/2018; 7:00 pm		Air Force	W 61–50	17–7 (9–4)	Moby Arena (1,137); Fort Collins, CO
02/10/2018; 3:00 pm		San José State	W 73–66	18–7 (10–4)	Event Center Arena (1,076); San Jose, CA
02/17/2018; 2:00 pm		Fresno State	L 64–75	18–8 (10–5)	Moby Arena (1,999); Fort Collins, CO
02/21/2018; 7:00 pm		at Boise State	L 49–55	18–9 (10–6)	Taco Bell Arena (641); Boise, ID
02/24/2018; 2:00 pm		Nevada	W 75–64	19–9 (11–6)	Moby Arena (1,747); Fort Collins, CO
02/27/2018; 7:00 pm		at New Mexico	L 48–54	19–10 (11–7)	The Pit (5,088); Albuquerque, NM
Mountain West Women's Tournament
03/06/2018; 3:30 pm	(5)	vs. (4) Fresno State; Quarterfinals	W 71–55	20–10	Thomas & Mack Center (1,293); Paradise, NV
03/07/2018; 7:30 pm	(5)	vs. (1) Boise State; Semifinals	L 51–76	20–11	Thomas & Mack Center; Paradise, NV
WNIT
03/15/2018*; 7:00 pm		Western Illinois; First Round	W 67–64	21–11	Moby Arena (772); Fort Collins, CO
03/18/2018*; 12:00 pm		at South Dakota; Second Round	L 49–74	21–12	Sanford Coyote Sports Center (2,089); Vermillion, SD
*Non-conference game. ^{#}Rankings from AP Poll. (#) Tournament seedings in parentheses. All times are in Mountain Time.

== See also ==
- 2017–18 Colorado State Rams men's basketball team
