= 2017–18 San Diego State Aztecs women's basketball team =

Intercollegiate basketball season

2017–18 San Diego State Aztecs women's basketball
- Conference: Mountain West Conference
- Record: 11–19 (5–13 Mountain West)
- Head coach: Stacie Terry (5th season)
- Assistant coaches: Jesse Clark; Ciara Carl; Nick Grant
- Home arena: Viejas Arena

2017–18 Mountain West Conference women's basketball standings
| | Conf. | | | | Overall |
| Team | W | | L | PCT | W | | L | PCT |
|---|---|---|---|---|---|---|---|---|
| Boise State † | 14 | – | 4 | .778 | 23 | – | 10 | .697 |
| UNLV | 14 | – | 4 | .778 | 19 | – | 12 | .613 |
| Wyoming | 13 | – | 5 | .722 | 22 | – | 11 | .667 |
| Colorado State | 11 | – | 7 | .611 | 21 | – | 12 | .636 |
| Fresno State | 11 | – | 7 | .611 | 17 | – | 15 | .531 |
| New Mexico | 10 | – | 8 | .556 | 25 | – | 11 | .694 |
| Nevada | 7 | – | 11 | .389 | 19 | – | 17 | .528 |
| San Diego State | 5 | – | 13 | .278 | 11 | – | 19 | .367 |
| Utah State | 5 | – | 13 | .278 | 7 | – | 23 | .233 |
| Air Force | 5 | – | 13 | .278 | 6 | – | 25 | .194 |
| San Jose State | 4 | – | 14 | .222 | 7 | – | 23 | .233 |
† 2018 MW Tournament winner Rankings from AP poll

The 2017–18 San Diego State Aztecs women's basketball team represented San Diego State University in the 2017–18 NCAA Division I women's basketball season. The Aztecs, led by fifth year head coach Stacie Terry, played their home games at Viejas Arena as members of the Mountain West Conference. They finished the season 11–19, 5–13 in Mountain West play to finish in a three way tie for eighth place. They lost in the first round of the Mountain West women's tournament to Nevada.

== Roster ==
2017–18 San Diego State Aztecs women's basketball team
Players
Coaches

| Pos. | # | Name | Height | Year | Previous school | Hometown |
|---|---|---|---|---|---|---|
| G | 0 | Kennedi Villa | 6 ft 0 in (1.83 m) | Fr | St. Mary's College HS | Oakland, CA |
| G/F | 1 | Khalia Lark | 6 ft 0 in (1.83 m) | RS Sr | Mater Dei; Washington | Irvine, CA |
| G | 3 | Jenay Bojorquez | 5 ft 6 in (1.68 m) | Fr | Sierra Linda HS | Phoenix, AZ |
| G | 5 | Te'a Adams | 5 ft 9 in (1.75 m) | Fr | Juanita HS | Kirkland, WA |
| G | 10 | Najé Murray | 5 ft 6 in (1.68 m) | Fr | St. May's HS | Stockton, CA |
| F | 11 | Arantxa Gomez Ferrer | 6 ft 0 in (1.83 m) | Jr | Parque Colegio Santa Ana HS | Valencia, Spain |
| G | 13 | Allison Brown | 5 ft 7 in (1.7 m) | Sr | Mater Dei HS | Anaheim Hills, CA |
| G | 15 | McKynzie Fort | 5 ft 9 in (1.75 m) | Sr | Etiwanda HS | Fontana, CA |
| G | 20 | Geena Gomez | 5 ft 8 in (1.73 m) | RS Sr | Edison HS; Saint Joseph's | Huntington Beach, CA |
| G | 21 | Abby Lowe | 5 ft 11 in (1.8 m) | So | Barking Abbey School | Stockport, England |
| G/F | 22 | Lexy Thorderson | 6 ft 0 in (1.83 m) | Sr | Rock Canyon HS | Castle Rock, CO |
| G | 30 | Cheyenne Greenhouse | 5 ft 11 in (1.8 m) | Sr | Canyon Springs HS | Riverside, CA |
| F | 34 | Baylee Vanderdoes | 6 ft 1 in (1.85 m) | So | Placer HS | Auburn, CA |
| F | 40 | Monique Terry | 6 ft 2 in (1.88 m) | So | Brennan HS | San Antonio, TX |
| C | 45 | Naomi Ekwedike | 6 ft 6 in (1.98 m) | So | Potter's House Christian Academy | Lagos, Nigeria |

Head coach

- Stacie Terry (UT Arlington)

Assistant coach(es)

- Jesse Clark (Pacific Union)
- Ciara Carl (Point Loma)
- Nick Grant (Baylor)

Legend

- (C) Team captain
- (S) Suspended
- (I) Ineligible
- (W) Walk-on
- Injured
- Current redshirt

Roster

== Schedule ==
| Date time, TV | Rank^{#} | Opponent^{#} | Result | Record | Site (attendance) city, state |
Exhibition
| 11/03/2017*; 6:30 pm | | Cal State Los Angeles | W 71–50 | | Viejas Arena (364); San Diego, CA |
Non-conference regular season
| 11/10/2017*; 12:00 pm | | Presbyterian | W 77–50 | 1–0 | Viejas Arena (464); San Diego, CA |
| 11/14/2017*; 6:30 pm | | Cal State Northridge | W 58–55 | 2–0 | Viejas Arena (366); San Diego, CA |
| 11/18/2017*; 12:00 pm | | Cal State Fullerton | W 59–58 | 3–0 | Viejas Arena (1,108); San Diego, CA |
| 11/24/2017*; 5:15 pm | | vs. Central Michigan; Junkanoo Jam Bimini Division semifinals | L 76–85 ^{OT} | 3–1 | Gateway Christian Academy; Bimini, Bahamas |
| 11/25/2017*; 7:00 pm | | vs. Tulane; Junkanoo Jam Bimini Division 3rd place game | L 46–80 | 3–2 | Gateway Christian Academy; Bimini, Bahamas |
| 11/27/2016*; 6:30 pm | | San Diego | W 77–76 | 4–2 | Viejas Arena (790); San Diego, CA |
| 12/03/2017*; 2:00 pm | | at Arizona | W 78–67 | 5–2 | McKale Center (1,555); Tucson, AZ |
| 12/08/2017*; 12:00 pm | | UC Irvine | L 65–67 | 5–3 | Viejas Arena (4,148); San Diego, CA |
| 12/10/2017*; 1:00 pm | | Hope International | W 92–68 | 6–3 | Viejas Arena (588); San Diego, CA |
| 12/14/2017*; 6:30 pm | | Santa Clara | L 34–48 | 6–4 | Viejas Arena (617); San Diego, CA |
| 12/22/2017*; 7:00 pm | | at UC Santa Barbara | L 64–77 | 6–5 | The Thunderdome (638); Santa Barbara, CA |
Mountain West regular season
| 12/28/2017; 6:30 pm | | Wyoming | W 68–62 | 7–5 (1–0) | Viejas Arena (2,029); San Diego, CA |
| 12/30/2017; 1:00 pm | | at Utah State | L 58–62 | 7–6 (1–1) | Smith Spectrum (368); Logan, UT |
| 01/03/2018; 6:30 pm | | Colorado State | L 63–65 | 7–7 (1–2) | Viejas Arena (490); San Diego, CA |
| 01/10/2018; 7:00 pm | | San Jose State | W 75–65 | 8–7 (2–2) | Event Center Arena (813); San Jose, CA |
| 01/13/2018; 7:00 pm | | Boise State | L 70–86 | 8–8 (2–3) | Viejas Arena (674); San Diego, CA |
| 01/17/2018; 7:00 pm | | Fresno State | L 53–64 | 8–9 (2–4) | Save Mart Center (2,122); Fresno, CA |
| 01/20/2018; 6:30 pm | | New Mexico | W 97–89 | 9–9 (3–4) | Viejas Arena (886); San Diego, CA |
| 01/24/2018; 6:00 pm | | at Colorado State | L 43–72 | 9–10 (3–5) | Moby Arena (1,175); Fort Collins, CO |
| 01/27/2018; 1:00 pm | | UNLV | L 64–75 | 9–11 (3–6) | Viejas Arena (4,568); San Diego, CA |
| 02/03/2018; 12:00 pm | | at Air Force | L 51–61 | 9–12 (3–7) | Clune Arena (918); Colorado Springs, CO |
| 02/07/2017; 12:00 pm | | Fresno State | L 60–66 | 9–13 (3–8) | Viejas Arena (4,306); San Diego, CA |
| 02/10/2018; 1:00 pm | | at Nevada | W 75–72 | 10–13 (4–8) | Viejas Arena (812); San Diego, CA |
| 02/14/2018; 5:30 pm | | Wyoming | L 50–70 | 10–14 (4–9) | Arena-Auditorium (3,026); Laramie, WY |
| 02/17/2018; 3:00 pm | | at UNLV | L 67–73 ^{OT} | 10–15 (4–10) | Cox Pavilion (783); Paradise, NV |
| 02/21/2017; 6:30 pm | | Air Force | L 48–56 | 10–16 (4–11) | Viejas Arena (414); San Diego, CA |
| 02/24/2018; 1:00 pm | | San Jose State | W 85–78 | 11–16 (5–11) | Viejas Arena (513); San Diego, CA |
| 02/27/2018; 6:00 pm | | at Boise State | L 53–64 | 11–17 (5–12) | Taco Bell Arena (809); Boise, ID |
| 03/02/2018; 1:00 pm | | Nevada | L 72–84 | 11–18 (5–13) | Lawlor Events Center (2,122); Reno, NV |
Mountain West Women's Tournament
| 03/05/2018; 4:30 pm | (10) | vs. (7) Nevada; First Round | L 84–95 ^{OT} | 11–19 | Thomas & Mack Center; Paradise, NV |
*Non-conference game. ^{#}Rankings from AP Poll. (#) Tournament seedings in parentheses. All times are in Pacific Time.

== See also ==
2017–18 San Diego State Aztecs men's basketball team
