= 2018 Women's Basketball Invitational =

American women's college basketball tournament

- Season: 2017–18
- Teams: 16
- Champions: Yale

The 2018 Women's Basketball Invitational (WBI) was a single-elimination tournament consisting of 16 National Collegiate Athletic Association (NCAA) Division I teams that did not participate in the 2018 NCAA Division I women's basketball tournament or 2018 Women's National Invitation Tournament. The 2018 field was announced on March 13. First round WBI games occurred on March 14 and 15; second-round games were played on March 19 and 20. The tournament semifinals were held March 23 and 24, and the 2018 WBI Championship game was held on March 29. Yale defeated Central Arkansas, 54–50, to become WBI champions.

== Bracket ==
First Round; March 14–15
Nevada	70
UC Irvine	60
Bakersfield	66
Fresno State	77
Texas Southern	56
Weber State	66
Central Arkansas	51
SIUE	39
Northeastern	58
Yale	68
Youngstown State	59
Binghamton	70
UNC Asheville	64
Furman	65
South Alabama	49
Stetson	33

Quarterfinals; March 19–20
Nevada	86
Fresno State	74
Weber State	67
Central Arkansas	82
Yale	70
Binghamton	64
Furman	53
South Alabama	54

Semifinals; March 24
Nevada	56
Central Arkansas	65
Yale	76*
South Alabama	74

Championship game March 29
Central Arkansas	50
Yale	54

* - Denotes overtime
