= 2017–18 San Jose State Spartans women's basketball team =

Intercollegiate basketball season

2017–18 San Jose State Spartans women's basketball
- Conference: Mountain West Conference
- Record: 7–23 (4–14 Mountain West)
- Head coach: Jamie Craighead (5th season)
- Assistant coaches: Dan Muscatell; Jourdan Willard; Alle Moreno
- Home arena: Event Center Arena

2017–18 Mountain West Conference women's basketball standings
	Conf.				Overall
Team	W		L	PCT	W		L	PCT
Boise State †	14	–	4	.778	23	–	10	.697
UNLV	14	–	4	.778	19	–	12	.613
Wyoming	13	–	5	.722	22	–	11	.667
Colorado State	11	–	7	.611	21	–	12	.636
Fresno State	11	–	7	.611	17	–	15	.531
New Mexico	10	–	8	.556	25	–	11	.694
Nevada	7	–	11	.389	19	–	17	.528
San Diego State	5	–	13	.278	11	–	19	.367
Utah State	5	–	13	.278	7	–	23	.233
Air Force	5	–	13	.278	6	–	25	.194
San Jose State	4	–	14	.222	7	–	23	.233
† 2018 MW Tournament winner Rankings from AP poll

The 2017–18 San Jose State Spartans women's basketball team represented San Jose State University in the 2017–18 NCAA Division I women's basketball season. The Spartans were led by fifth-year head coach Jamie Craighead and played home games at the Event Center Arena as a member of the Mountain West Conference. They finished the season 7–23, 4–14 in Mountain West play to finish in last place. They lost in the first round of the Mountain West women's tournament to New Mexico.

== Roster ==
2017–18 San Jose State Spartans women's basketball team
Players
Coaches

Pos.	#	Name	Height	Year	Previous school	Hometown
G/F	30	Megan Anderson	6 ft 0 in (1.83 m)	Fr	Clovis West HS	Fresno, California
G	5	Analyss Benally	5 ft 8 in (1.73 m)	So	Wichita Heights HS	Park City, Kansas
F	42	Chinwe Ezeonu	6 ft 1 in (1.85 m)	Fr	Seattle Preparatory HS	Seattle, Washington
F	23	Hallie Gennett	5 ft 11 in (1.8 m)	Sr	Sacramento State	Post Falls, Idaho
G	4	Fa-Ko-Fieme'a Hafoka	5 ft 9 in (1.75 m)	So	Lahainaluna HS	Kihei, Hawaii
C	24	Alexis Harris	6 ft 3 in (1.91 m)	So	Palo Alto HS	Palo Alto, California
G	0	Helenya Hill	5 ft 6 in (1.68 m)	Fr	Archbishop Mitty HS	Santa Cruz, California
G/F	2	Andrea Kohlhaas	5 ft 11 in (1.8 m)	Jr	Otto-Hahn HS	Besigheim, Germany
G	1	Myzhanique Ladd	5 ft 10 in (1.78 m)	Sr	Cleveland HS	Seattle, Washington
F	35	Cydni Lewis	6 ft 0 in (1.83 m)	Fr	Mater Dei HS	Long Beach, California
PG	22	Danae Marquez	5 ft 5 in (1.65 m)	Fr	Clovis West HS	Fresno, California
F	12	Anna Thomasdotter (redshirt)	6 ft 0 in (1.83 m)	Fr	Lund Cathedral HS	Lund, Sweden
PG	3	Taylor Turney	5 ft 9 in (1.75 m)	So	Liberty HS	Henderson, Nevada
G/F	32	Mikaylah Wilson	5 ft 10 in (1.78 m)	Fr	Etiwanda HS	Rancho Cucamonga, California

Head coach

- Jamie Craighead (Oregon)

Assistant coach(es)

- Dan Muscatell (Western Washington)
- Jourdan Willard (Sacramento State)
- Alle Moreno (Sacramento State)

Legend

- (C) Team captain
- (S) Suspended
- (I) Ineligible
- (W) Walk-on
- Injured
- Current redshirt

Roster

== Schedule ==
Date time, TV	Rank^{#}	Opponent^{#}	Result	Record	High points	High rebounds	High assists	Site (attendance) city, state
Exhibition
November 5, 2017*; 2:00 p.m.		Stanislaus State	W 83–72		12 – Ladd	10 – Ladd	5 – Tied	Event Center Arena; San Jose, CA
Non-conference regular season
November 10, 2017*; 7:00 p.m.		at No. 8 UCLA	L 69–129	0–1	11 – Tied	5 – Tied	5 – Marquez	Pauley Pavilion (1,437); Los Angeles, CA
November 17, 2017*; 7:00 p.m.		Cal State Bakersfield	W 67–57	1–1	15 – Turney	11 – Ladd	9 – Turney	Event Center Arena (315); San Jose, CA
November 10, 2017*; 2:00 p.m.		Portland State	L 78–90	1–2	21 – Turney	9 – Ladd	7 – Marquez	Event Center Arena; San Jose, CA
November 24, 2017*; 3:30 p.m., TheW.tv		at Pacific; Tiger Turkey Tip-Off	L 97–106	1–3	15 – Benally	11 – Wilson	4 – Turney	Alex G. Spanos Center (351); Stockton, CA
November 25, 2017*; 1:00 p.m.		vs. Hampton; Tiger Turkey Tip-Off	L 73–81	1–4	20 – Turney	9 – Ladd	4 – Turney	Alex G. Spanos Center (440); Stockton, CA
November 28, 2017*; 7:00 p.m., TheW.tv		at Santa Clara	W 71–66 ^{OT}	2–4	14 – Tied	9 – Ladd	6 – Ladd	Leavey Center (417); Santa Clara, CA
December 1, 2017*; 7:00 p.m.		San Francisco	L 81–87	2–5	20 – Turney	12 – Ladd	5 – Marquez	Event Center Arena (773); San Jose, CA
December 7, 2017*; 7:00 p.m.		Cal State Northridge	L 59–76	2–6	11 – Marquez	5 – Harris	4 – Turney	Event Center Arena (727); San Jose, CA
December 10, 2017*; 2:00 p.m.		at No. 19 Oregon State	L 62–110	2–7	19 – Ladd	5 – Turney	3 – Tied	Gill Coliseum (3,198); Corvallis, OR
December 17, 2017*; 12:00 p.m.		Nebraska	L 55–81	2–8	12 – Tied	10 – Lewis	4 – Hafoka	Event Center Arena (1,424); San Jose, CA
December 20, 2017*; 7:00 p.m.		Southern Oregon	W 89–87 ^{OT}	3–8	18 – Ladd	9 – Harris	6 – Turney	Event Center Arena (719); San Jose, CA
Mountain West regular season
December 28, 2017; 7:00 p.m.		Utah State	W 79–66	4–8 (1–0)	24 – Turney	6 – Tied	5 – Hafoka	Event Center Arena (736); San Jose, CA
December 30, 2017; 1:00 p.m.		at Colorado State	L 48–63	4–9 (1–1)	16 – Ladd	10 – Ladd	6 – Turney	Moby Arena (1,153); Fort Collins, CO
January 3, 2018; 6:00 p.m.		at UNLV	L 60–79	4–10 (1–2)	13 – Turney	5 – Ladd	5 – Ladd	Cox Pavilion (2,055); Paradise, NV
January 6, 2018; 2:00 p.m.		New Mexico	W 95–86	5–10 (2–2)	27 – Ladd	6 – Tied	8 – Marquez	Event Center Arena (836); San Jose, CA
January 10, 2018; 7:00 p.m.		San Diego State	L 65–75	5–11 (2–3)	16 – Ladd	11 – Ladd	4 – Turney	Event Center Arena (813); San Jose, CA
January 13, 2018; 12:00 p.m.		at Air Force	W 75–74	6–11 (3–3)	17 – Turney	13 – Ladd	6 – Turney	Clune Arena (459); Colorado Springs, CO
January 17, 2018; 6:30 p.m.		at Nevada	L 63–91	6–12 (3–4)	28 – Turney	5 – Ladd	3 – 3 tied	Lawlor Events Center (1,026); Reno, NV
January 24, 2018; 7:00 p.m.		Boise State	L 80–112	6–13 (3–5)	16 – Turney	5 – Harris	5 – Marquez	Event Center Arena (889); San Jose, CA
January 27, 2018; 1:00 p.m.		at Wyoming	L 46–58	6–14 (3–6)	10 – Hafoka	6 – Tied	2 – Turney	Arena-Auditorium (3,141); Laramie, WY
January 31, 2018; 7:00 p.m.		UNLV	L 53–80	6–15 (3–7)	12 – Anderson	9 – Ladd	5 – Marquez	Event Center Arena (767); San Jose, CA
February 3, 2018; 1:00 p.m.		at New Mexico	L 62–92	6–16 (3–8)	14 – Benally	7 – Ladd	4 – Marquez	The Pit (5,403); Albuquerque, NM
February 10, 2018; 2:00 p.m.		Colorado State	L 66–73	6–17 (3–9)	15 – Tied	8 – Lewis	5 – Turney	Event Center Arena (1,076); San Jose, CA
February 14, 2018; 7:00 p.m.		at Fresno State; Rivalry	L 71–81	6–18 (3–10)	22 – Turney	8 – Wilson	6 – Turney	Save Mart Center (2,108); Fresno, CA
February 17, 2018; 2:00 p.m.		Wyoming	L 64–66	6–19 (3–11)	26 – Ladd	5 – Ladd	7 – Turney	Event Center Arena (344); San Jose, CA
February 21, 2018; 7:00 p.m.		Nevada	W 57–54	7–19 (4–11)	13 – Benally	9 – Anderson	6 – Ladd	Event Center Arena (766); San Jose, CA
February 24, 2018; 1:00 p.m.		at San Diego State	L 78–85	7–20 (4–12)	22 – Lewis	7 – 2 tied	4 – 2 tied	Viejas Arena (513); San Diego, CA
February 27, 2018; 6:00 p.m.		at Utah State	L 78–86	7–21 (4–13)	21 – Ladd	9 – Ladd	5 – Ladd	Smith Spectrum (311); Logan, UT
March 2, 2018; 7:00 p.m.		Air Force	L 60–66	7–22 (4–14)	13 – 2 tied	8 – Ladd	5 – Turney	Event Center Arena (829); San Jose, CA
Mountain West tournament
March 2, 2018; 7:00 p.m.	(11)	(6) New Mexico; First Round	L 54–84	7–23	19 – Ladd	5 – Garnett	3 – Turney	Thomas & Mack Center (1,542); Paradise, NV
*Non-conference game. ^{#}Rankings from AP Poll. (#) Tournament seedings in parentheses. All times are in Pacific Time.

All home games where a television provider is not indicated are televised on the Mountain West Network.

== See also ==
- 2017–18 San Jose State Spartans men's basketball team
