= 2017–18 Wyoming Cowgirls basketball team =

Intercollegiate basketball season

2017–18 Wyoming Cowgirls basketball

WNIT, Second Round
- Conference: Mountain West Conference
- Record: 22–11 (13–5 Mountain West)
- Head coach: Joe Legerski (15th season)
- Assistant coaches: Gerald Mattinson; Bojan Janković; Heather Ezell
- Home arena: Arena-Auditorium

2017–18 Mountain West Conference women's basketball standings
| | Conf. | | | | Overall |
| Team | W | | L | PCT | W | | L | PCT |
|---|---|---|---|---|---|---|---|---|
| Boise State † | 14 | – | 4 | .778 | 23 | – | 10 | .697 |
| UNLV | 14 | – | 4 | .778 | 19 | – | 12 | .613 |
| Wyoming | 13 | – | 5 | .722 | 22 | – | 11 | .667 |
| Colorado State | 11 | – | 7 | .611 | 21 | – | 12 | .636 |
| Fresno State | 11 | – | 7 | .611 | 17 | – | 15 | .531 |
| New Mexico | 10 | – | 8 | .556 | 25 | – | 11 | .694 |
| Nevada | 7 | – | 11 | .389 | 19 | – | 17 | .528 |
| San Diego State | 5 | – | 13 | .278 | 11 | – | 19 | .367 |
| Utah State | 5 | – | 13 | .278 | 7 | – | 23 | .233 |
| Air Force | 5 | – | 13 | .278 | 6 | – | 25 | .194 |
| San Jose State | 4 | – | 14 | .222 | 7 | – | 23 | .233 |
† 2018 MW Tournament winner Rankings from AP poll

The 2017–18 Wyoming Cowgirls basketball team represent the University of Wyoming in the 2016–17 college basketball season. The Cowgirls are led by fifteenth year head coach Joe Legerski. The Cowgirls played their home games at the Arena-Auditorium and are members of the Mountain West Conference. They Finished the season 22-11, 13-5 in Mountain West play to finish in third place. They lost in the semifinals of the Mountain West tournament to Nevada. They were invited to the 2018 Women's National Invitation Tournament where they won in the first round against New Mexico State, but lost in the second round.

== Roster ==
2017–18 Wyoming Cowgirls women's basketball team
Players
Coaches

| Pos. | # | Name | Height | Year | Previous school | Hometown |
|---|---|---|---|---|---|---|
| G | 3 | Elisa Pilli (redshirt) | 5 ft 7 in (1.7 m) | RS So | Liceo Scientifico Parini | Padova, ITA |
| F | 4 | Taylor Rusk | 5 ft 11 in (1.8 m) | So | ThunderRidge HS | Highlands Ranch, CO |
| G | 5 | Sladjana Rakovic | 6 ft 0 in (1.83 m) | Jr | Western Nebraska | Bijelo Polje, MNE |
| F | 10 | Selale Kepenc | 6 ft 2 in (1.88 m) | So | Bostenci Doga College | Istanbul, TUR |
| F | 12 | Marta Gomez | 6 ft 1 in (1.85 m) | Jr | INS Joaquim Blume | Valles, ESP |
| G | 13 | Liv Roberts | 5 ft 11 in (1.8 m) | Sr | Sentinel HS | Missoula, MT |
| F | 14 | Natalie Baker | 6 ft 0 in (1.83 m) | Sr | Chaparral HS | Parker, CO |
| G | 22 | Clara Tapia | 5 ft 7 in (1.7 m) | Jr | Universitat Pompeu Fabra | Barcelona, ESP |
| F | 23 | Bailee Cotton | 6 ft 2 in (1.88 m) | RS Jr | Denver School S&T | Denver, CO |
| G | 24 | Skyler Snodgrass | 5 ft 10 in (1.78 m) | Sr | Andover Central HS | Wichita, KS |
| F | 32 | Tijana Raca | 6 ft 0 in (1.83 m) | So | Aristoteleio College | Pyles, GRC |
| F | 40 | Coreen Labish | 6 ft 2 in (1.88 m) | RS So | Mead HS | Cheney, WA |
| F | 42 | Marleah Campbell | 6 ft 2 in (1.88 m) | Sr | Shawnee Mission West HS | Lenexa, KS |
| F | 44 | Rachelle Tucker | 6 ft 2 in (1.88 m) | Jr | Pierce HS | Pierce, NE |

Head coach

- Joe Legerski (Wyoming)

Assistant coach(es)

- Gerald Mattinson (Weber State)
- Bojan Janković (Ozarks)
- Heather Ezell (Iowa State)

Legend

- (C) Team captain
- (S) Suspended
- (I) Ineligible
- (W) Walk-on
- Injured
- Current redshirt

Roster
Last update: December 4, 2017

== Statistics ==
| Player | GP | GS | MPG | FG% | 3FG% | FT% | RPG | APG | BPG | SPG | PPG |
|---|---|---|---|---|---|---|---|---|---|---|---|
| Natalie Baker | 32 | 32 | 23.0 | .377 | .303 | .725 | 4.3 | 1.2 | 0.2 | 0.6 | 7.0 |
| Marleah Campbell | 19 | 0 | 6.3 | .419 | .714 | .750 | 1.2 | 0.3 | 0.1 | 0.2 | 1.9 |
| Bailee Cotton | 32 | 32 | 26.9 | .421 | .000 | .723 | 6.2 | 1.1 | 0.5 | 1.3 | 8.3 |
| Marta Gomez | 32 | 0 | 21.8 | .467 | .483 | .742 | 2.7 | 1.2 | 0.2 | 0.3 | 8.7 |
| Selale Kepenc | 24 | 0 | 8.3 | .410 | .370 | .500 | 1.2 | 0.2 | 0.2 | 0.2 | 3.5 |
| Coreen Labish | 3 | 0 | 5.3 | .000 | .000 | .000 | 1.0 | 0.0 | 0.0 | 0.0 | 0.0 |
| Tijana Raca | 13 | 0 | 6.1 | .375 | .167 | .000 | 0.6 | 0.6 | 0.0 | 0.1 | 1.5 |
| Sladjana Rakovic | 32 | 1 | 15.6 | .345 | .188 | .767 | 3.9 | 1.1 | 0.0 | 0.3 | 4.0 |
| Liv Roberts | 31 | 31 | 32.5 | .474 | .367 | .819 | 6.0 | 1.7 | 0.5 | 0.7 | 14.1 |
| Taylor Rusk | 32 | 32 | 33.5 | .455 | .429 | .730 | 3.4 | 3.0 | 0.3 | 1.0 | 10.2 |
| Skyler Snodgrass | 12 | 0 | 5.8 | .176 | .200 | .000 | 0.5 | 0.2 | 0.0 | 0.3 | 0.7 |
| Clara Tapia | 32 | 32 | 31.5 | .356 | .217 | .825 | 2.3 | 4.3 | 0.0 | 0.6 | 4.6 |
| Rachelle Tucker | 8 | 0 | 4.9 | .417 | .000 | .000 | 0.9 | 0.0 | 0.3 | 0.3 | 1.3 |

== Schedule ==
| Date time, TV | Rank^{#} | Opponent^{#} | Result | Record | Site (attendance) city, state |
Exhibition
| 11/03/2017*; 5:30 pm | | Chadron State | W 77–25 | | Arena-Auditorium (3,351); Laramie, WY |
Non-conference regular season
| 11/11/2017*; 2:00 pm | | Adams State | W 73–47 | 1–0 | Arena-Auditorium (2,608); Laramie, WY |
| 11/13/2017*; 6:30 pm | | Montana | W 67–62 | 2–0 | Arena-Auditorium (2,484); Laramie, WY |
| 11/16/2017*; 7:00 pm | | at Denver | W 61–51 | 3–0 | Hamilton Gymnasium (284); Denver, CO |
| 11/21/2017*; 6:30 pm | | Drake | W 75–61 | 4–0 | Arena-Auditorium (2,453); Laramie, WY |
| 11/25/2017*; 10:00 am | | vs. Northern Iowa; UCF Thanksgiving Classic | L 40–55 | 4–1 | CFE Arena; Orlando, FL |
| 11/27/2016*; 9:00 am | | vs. IUPUI; UCF Thanksgiving Classic | L 59–65 | 4–2 | CFE Arena; Orlando, FL |
| 11/29/2017*; 11:00 am | | at Montana State | L 46–50 | 4–3 | Worthington Arena (6,012); Bozeman, MT |
| 12/03/2017*; 1:00 pm | | Idaho State | W 61–53 | 5–3 | Arena-Auditorium (2,460); Laramie, WY |
| 12/09/2017*; 1:00 pm | | at Idaho | W 70–64 | 6–3 | Memorial Gym (454); Moscow, ID |
| 12/12/2017*; 4:00 pm | | Colorado Christian | W 62–33 | 7–3 | Arena-Auditorium (1,374); Laramie, WY |
| 12/21/2017*; 5:00 pm | | at No. 16 Duke | L 40–63 | 7–4 | Cameron Indoor Stadium (3,021); Durham, NC |
Mountain West regular season
| 12/28/2017; 7:30 pm | | at San Diego State | L 62–68 | 7–5 (0–1) | Viejas Arena (2,029); San Diego, CA |
| 01/03/2018; 6:30 pm | | Nevada | W 66–60 | 8–5 (1–1) | Arena-Auditorium (2,207); Laramie, WY |
| 01/06/2018; 2:00 pm | | at Boise State | W 66–51 | 9–5 (2–1) | Taco Bell Arena (1,025); Boise, ID |
| 01/10/2018; 6:30 pm | | New Mexico | W 66–55 | 10–5 (3–1) | Arena-Auditorium (2,105); Laramie, WY |
| 01/13/2018; 2:00 pm | | at Colorado State; Border War | W 53–49 | 11–5 (4–1) | Moby Arena (2,678); Colorado Springs, CO |
| 01/20/2018; 2:00 pm | | Utah State | W 61–44 | 12–5 (5–1) | Arena-Auditorium (2,563); Laramie, WY |
| 01/24/2018; 7:30 pm | | at Nevada | W 65–62 | 13–5 (6–1) | Lawlor Events Center (1,109); Reno, NV |
| 01/27/2018; 2:00 pm | | San José State | W 58–46 | 14–5 (7–1) | Arena-Auditorium (3,248); Laramie, WY |
| 01/31/2018; 6:30 pm | | Colorado State; Border War | L 53–64 | 14–6 (7–2) | Arena-Auditorium (3,158); Laramie, WY |
| 02/03/2018; 3:00 pm | | at Fresno State | L 47–60 | 14–7 (7–3) | Save Mart Center (2,174); Fresno, CA |
| 02/07/2018; 7:00 pm | | at Utah State | W 64–46 | 15–7 (8–3) | Smith Spectrum (794); Logan, UT |
| 02/10/2018; 2:00 pm | | UNLV | W 69–57 | 16–7 (9–3) | Arena-Auditorium (3,223); Laramie, WY |
| 02/14/2018; 6:30 pm | | San Diego State | W 70–50 | 17–7 (10–3) | Arena-Auditorium (3,026); Laramie, WY |
| 02/17/2018; 3:00 pm | | at San José State | W 66–64 | 18–7 (11–3) | Event Center Arena (629); San Jose, CA |
| 02/21/2018; 7:00 pm | | at New Mexico | W 63–62 | 19–7 (12–3) | The Pit (4,769); Albuquerque, NM |
| 02/24/2018; 2:00 pm | | Fresno State | W 74–57 | 20–7 (13–3) | Arena-Auditorium (3,021); Laramie, WY |
| 02/27/2018; 7:00 pm | | at Air Force | L 47–57 | 20–8 (13–4) | Clune Arena (237); Colorado Springs, CO |
| 03/03/2018; 6:30 pm | | Boise State | L 63–67 | 20–9 (13–5) | Arena-Auditorium (6,312); Laramie, WY |
Mountain West Women's Tournament
| 03/06/2018; 9:30 pm | (3) | vs. (6) New Mexico; Quarterfinals | W 69–66 | 21–9 | Thomas & Mack Center (2,273); Paradise, NV |
| 03/07/2018; 10:00 pm | (3) | vs. (7) Nevada; Semifinals | L 63–67 | 21–10 | Thomas & Mack Center (3,298); Paradise, NV |
WNIT
| 03/15/2018; 6:30 pm | | New Mexico State; First round | W 67–59 | 22–10 | Arena-Auditorium (2,788); Larime, WY |
| 03/18/2018; 1:00 pm | | UC Davis; Second round | L 64–72 | 22–11 | Arena-Auditorium (5,493); Larime, WY |
*Non-conference game. ^{#}Rankings from AP Poll. (#) Tournament seedings in parentheses. All times are in Mountain Time. All dates, times, and TV are tentative and subject to change.

== See also ==
- 2017–18 Wyoming Cowboys basketball team
