= 2017–18 Utah State Aggies women's basketball team =

Intercollegiate basketball season

2017–18 Utah State Aggies women's basketball
- Conference: Mountain West Conference
- Record: 7–23 (5–13 Mountain West)
- Head coach: Jerry Finkbeiner (6th season)
- Assistant coaches: Ben Finkbeiner; JC Carter; Kelsie Kruger
- Home arena: Smith Spectrum

2017–18 Mountain West Conference women's basketball standings
	Conf.				Overall
Team	W		L	PCT	W		L	PCT
Boise State †	14	–	4	.778	23	–	10	.697
UNLV	14	–	4	.778	19	–	12	.613
Wyoming	13	–	5	.722	22	–	11	.667
Colorado State	11	–	7	.611	21	–	12	.636
Fresno State	11	–	7	.611	17	–	15	.531
New Mexico	10	–	8	.556	25	–	11	.694
Nevada	7	–	11	.389	19	–	17	.528
San Diego State	5	–	13	.278	11	–	19	.367
Utah State	5	–	13	.278	7	–	23	.233
Air Force	5	–	13	.278	6	–	25	.194
San Jose State	4	–	14	.222	7	–	23	.233
† 2018 MW Tournament winner Rankings from AP poll

The 2017–18 Utah State Aggies women's basketball team represented Utah State University in the 2017–18 NCAA Division I women's basketball season. The Aggies were led by sixth year head coach Jerry Finkbeiner. The Aggies played their home games at the Smith Spectrum and were members of the Mountain West Conference. They finished the season 7–23, 5–13 in Mountain West play to finish in a three-way tie for eighth place. They lost in the first round of the Mountain West women's tournament to Air Force.

== Previous season ==
They finished the season 17–15, 9–9 in Mountain West play to finish in sixth place. They advanced to the quarterfinals of the Mountain West women's tournament where they lost to UNLV. They were invited to the Women's Basketball Invitational where they lost to Idaho in the first round.

== Roster ==
2017–18 Utah State Aggies women's basketball team
Players
Coaches

Pos.	#	Name	Height	Year	Previous school	Hometown
G	1	Eliza West	5 ft 5 in (1.65 m)	So	Peninsula School	Mount Martha, Australia
G	2	Jessie Geer	5 ft 8 in (1.73 m)	So	Campbell County HS	Gillette, WY
G	3	Olivia West	5 ft 5 in (1.65 m)	So	Templestowe College	Launceston, Australia
F	5	Shannon Dufficy	6 ft 1 in (1.85 m)	So	Our Lady of Mercy College	Preston, Australia
G	11	Lindsey Jensen	5 ft 9 in (1.75 m)	RS So	Sky View	Smithfield, UT
G/F	12	Hailey Bassett	6 ft 2 in (1.88 m)	So	Layton	Layton, UT
C	15	Laura Daulton	6 ft 2 in (1.88 m)	Fr	Oak Ridge	Spring, TX
G	21	Victoria Price	5 ft 8 in (1.73 m)	RS So	Grand Prairie	Grand Prairie, TX
G	22	Rachel Brewster	5 ft 11 in (1.8 m)	Jr	Rowville Secondary College	Melbourne, Australia
G	32	Emmie Harris	5 ft 10 in (1.78 m)	Fr	Boyle County	Danville, KY
F	41	Taylor Franson	6 ft 1 in (1.85 m)	Fr	American Fork	American Fork, UT
C	44	Deja Mason	6 ft 4 in (1.93 m)	Jr	Brennan HS	San Antonio, TX

Head coach

- Jerry Finkbeiner (Southern Nazarene)

Assistant coach(es)

- Ben Finkbeiner (Oral Roberts)
- JC Carter (Southwest Baptist)
- Kelsie Kruger (Adams State)

Legend

- (C) Team captain
- (S) Suspended
- (I) Ineligible
- (W) Walk-on
- Injured
- Current redshirt

Roster
Last update: January 6, 2018

== Schedule ==
Date time, TV	Rank^{#}	Opponent^{#}	Result	Record	Site (attendance) city, state
Exhibition
11/04/2017*; 2:00 pm		Westminster (Utah)	W 72–55		Smith Spectrum (443); Logan, UT
Non-conference regular season
11/10/2017*; 8:00 pm		at UC Irvine	L 84–87	0–1	Bren Events Center (421); Irvine, CA
11/14/2017*; 12:00 pm		Dixie State	W 92–72	1–1	Smith Spectrum (3,441); Logan, UT
11/17/2017*; 7:00 pm		Arizona	L 49–65	1–2	Smith Spectrum (597); Logan, UT
11/21/2017*; 5:00 pm		at Southern Utah; Old Oquirrh Bucket	L 67–70	1–3	America First Events Center (450); Cedar City, UT
11/27/2017*; 7:00 pm		at Idaho State	L 44–64	1–4	Reed Gym (1,038); Pocatello, ID
12/01/2017*; 7:00 pm		vs. Montana State; Maui Classic	L 52–64	1–5	War Memorial Gym; Wailuku, HI
12/02/2017*; 10:00 pm		vs. No. 21 Oregon State; Maui Classic	L 55–94	1–6	War Memorial Gym (590); Wailuku, HI
12/06/2017*; 4:00 pm, BYUtv		at BYU; Old Oquirrh Bucket	W 76–69	2–6	Marriott Center (385); Provo, UT
12/09/2017*; 3:00 pm		at Utah Valley; Old Oquirrh Bucket	L 43–61	2–7	Lockhart Arena (309); Orem, UT
12/16/2017*; 2:00 pm		Denver	L 72–74 ^{OT}	2–8	Smith Spectrum (325); Logan, UT
12/18/2017*; 7:00 pm		Utah; Old Oquirrh Bucket	L 44–79	2–9	Smith Spectrum (666); Logan, UT
Mountain West regular season
12/28/2017; 8:00 pm		at San Jose State	L 66–79	2–10 (0–1)	Event Center Arena (736); San Jose, CA
12/30/2017; 2:00 pm		San Diego State	W 62–58	3–10 (1–1)	Smith Spectrum (368); Logan, UT
01/03/2018; 8:00 pm		at Fresno State	L 56–57	3–11 (1–2)	Save Mart Center (2,904); Fresno, CA
01/06/2018; 2:00 pm		UNLV	L 54–63	3–12 (1–3)	Smith Spectrum (346); Logan, UT
01/10/2018; 7:00 pm		at Colorado State	L 45–56	3–13 (1–4)	Moby Arena (951); Fort Collins, CO
01/13/2018; 2:00 pm		Nevada	W 79–57	4–13 (2–4)	Smith Spectrum (235); Logan, UT
01/17/2018; 7:00 pm		Boise State	L 42–64	4–14 (2–5)	Smith Spectrum (563); Logan, UT
01/20/2018; 7:00 pm		at Wyoming	L 44–61	4–15 (2–6)	Arena-Auditorium (2,563); Laramie, WY
01/24/2018; 7:00 pm		at Air Force	L 50–57	4–16 (2–7)	Clune Arena (253); Colorado Springs, CO
01/27/2018; 2:00 pm		Fresno State	W 60–52	5–16 (3–7)	Smith Spectrum (461); Logan, UT
01/31/2018; 7:00 pm		at New Mexico	L 47–80	5–17 (3–8)	Dreamstyle Arena (4,472); Albuquerque, NM
02/07/2018; 7:00 pm		Wyoming	L 46–64	5–18 (3–9)	Smith Spectrum (794); Logan, UT
02/10/2018; 2:00 pm		at Boise State	L 68–80	5–19 (3–10)	Taco Bell Arena (1,257); Boise, ID
02/14/2018; 7:00 pm		New Mexico	L 50–74	5–20 (3–11)	Smith Spectrum (286); Logan, UT
02/17/2018; 3:00 pm		at Nevada	L 78–85 ^{OT}	5–21 (3–12)	Lawlor Events Center (2,132); Reno, NV
02/24/2018; 2:00 pm		Air Force	W 57–55	6–21 (4–12)	Smith Spectrum (327); Logan, UT
02/27/2018; 7:00 pm		San Jose State	W 86–78	7–21 (5–12)	Smith Spectrum (311); Logan, UT
03/02/2018; 7:00 pm		at UNLV	L 58–68	7–22 (5–13)	Cox Pavilion (1,001); Paradise, NV
Mountain West Women's Tournament
03/05/2018; 3:00 pm	(9)	vs. (8) Air Force; First Round	L 54–68	7–23	Thomas & Mack Center; Paradise, NV
*Non-conference game. ^{#}Rankings from AP Poll. (#) Tournament seedings in parentheses. All times are in Mountain Time.

== See also ==
- 2017–18 Utah State Aggies men's basketball team
