= 2017–18 Fresno State Bulldogs women's basketball team =

Intercollegiate basketball season

2017–18 Fresno State Bulldogs women's basketball

WBI, Quarterfinals
- Conference: Mountain West Conference
- Record: 17–15 (11–7 Mountain West)
- Head coach: Jaime White (4th season)
- Assistant coaches: Mandi Carver; Bobby Ratterree; Shannon Bush
- Home arena: Save Mart Center

2017–18 Mountain West Conference women's basketball standings
	Conf.				Overall
Team	W		L	PCT	W		L	PCT
Boise State †	14	–	4	.778	23	–	10	.697
UNLV	14	–	4	.778	19	–	12	.613
Wyoming	13	–	5	.722	22	–	11	.667
Colorado State	11	–	7	.611	21	–	12	.636
Fresno State	11	–	7	.611	17	–	15	.531
New Mexico	10	–	8	.556	25	–	11	.694
Nevada	7	–	11	.389	19	–	17	.528
San Diego State	5	–	13	.278	11	–	19	.367
Utah State	5	–	13	.278	7	–	23	.233
Air Force	5	–	13	.278	6	–	25	.194
San Jose State	4	–	14	.222	7	–	23	.233
† 2018 MW Tournament winner Rankings from AP poll

The 2017–18 Fresno State Bulldogs women's basketball team represented California State University, Fresno during the 2017–18 NCAA Division I women's basketball season. The Bulldogs, led by fourth year head coach Jaime White, played their home games at the Save Mart Center and were members of the Mountain West Conference. They finished the season 17–15, 11–7 in Mountain West play to finish in a tie for fourth place. They lost in the quarterfinals of the Mountain West women's tournament to Colorado State. They received an invite to the WBI, where they defeated UC Irvine in the first round before losing to Mountain West member Nevada in the quarterfinals.

== Roster ==
2017–18 Fresno State Bulldogs women's basketball team
Players
Coaches

Pos.	#	Name	Height	Year	Previous school	Hometown
G	2	Raven Johnson	5 ft 11 in (1.8 m)	Jr	Skyline	Dallas, TX
G	3	Tory Jacobs	5 ft 10 in (1.78 m)	RS Jr	MacArthur; Minnesota	Dallas, TX
C	5	Katelin Noyer	6 ft 5 in (1.96 m)	So	Westlake Girls	Auckland, New Zealand
G	10	Candace White	5 ft 8 in (1.73 m)	Jr	Modesto Christian	Modesto, CA
F	11	Maddi Utti	5 ft 10 in (1.78 m)	Fr	Seaside	Seaside, OR
F	12	Genna Ogier	6 ft 1 in (1.85 m)	Fr	Yarra Valley Grammar	Melbourne, Australia
G	13	Breanne Knishka	5 ft 10 in (1.78 m)	Jr	Cashmere	Dryden, WA
F	14	Jordanna Porter	5 ft 11 in (1.8 m)	RS So	Ellison; Utah	Killeen, TX
G/F	20	Bree Delaney	5 ft 10 in (1.78 m)	Fr	Monte Sant' Angelo Mercy	Sydney, Australia
G	22	Aly Gamez	5 ft 6 in (1.68 m)	Fr	MacArthur	Irving, TX
G	23	Tia Elbert	5 ft 7 in (1.7 m)	Jr	Tartan	Oakdale, MN
G	24	Saraya Smith	6 ft 0 in (1.83 m)	So	Ponderosa	El Dorado Hills, CA
G/F	30	Kristina Cavey	6 ft 0 in (1.83 m)	So	Berthoud	Berthoud, CO
F	33	Megan Nilsson	6 ft 2 in (1.88 m)	So	Mt. Spokane	Colbert, WA

Head coach

- Jaime White (Southern Utah)

Assistant coach(es)

- Mandi Carver (Idaho State)
- Bobby Ratterree (Northern Colorado)
- Shannon Bush (Holy Cross)

Legend

- (C) Team captain
- (S) Suspended
- (I) Ineligible
- (W) Walk-on
- Injured
- Current redshirt

Roster
Last update: January 6, 2018

== Schedule ==
Date time, TV	Rank^{#}	Opponent^{#}	Result	Record	Site (attendance) city, state
Exitbition
11/03/2017*; 5:00 pm		Fresno Pacific	W 93–59		Save Mart Center (1,929); Fresno, CA
Non-conference regular season
11/10/2017*; 7:30 pm		Eastern Washington	W 81–56	1–0	Save Mart Center (1,853); Fresno, CA
11/13/2017*; 3:00 pm		Arizona State	L 49–86	1–1	Save Mart Center (2,209); Fresno, CA
11/19/2017*; 2:00 pm		UC Riverside	L 56–68	1–2	Save Mart Center (1,886); Fresno, CA
11/24/2017*; 12:00 pm, ESPN3		at Texas–Arlington	L 54–67	1–3	College Park Center (735); Arlington, TX
11/25/2017*; 12:00 pm		at Texas State	L 59–76	1–4	Strahan Coliseum (1,047); San Marcos, TX
11/30/2017*; 7:00 pm		at UC Santa Barbara	W 64–57	2–4	The Thunderdome (286); Santa Barbara, CA
12/02/2017*; 7:00 pm		at Cal State Northridge	L 72–85	2–5	Matadome (237); Northridge, CA
12/07/2017*; 7:00 pm		Pacific	W 81–70	3–5	Save Mart Center (1,978); Fresno, CA
12/10/2017*; 2:00 pm, Stadium		Montana	W 61–58	4–5	Save Mart Center (1,872); Fresno, CA
12/17/2017*; 2:00 pm		at San Francisco	L 62–70	4–6	War Memorial Gymnasium (302); San Francisco, CA
12/20/2017*; 12:00 pm		Weber State	L 71–78	5–6	Save Mart Center (1,934); Fresno, CA
Mountain West regular season
12/28/2017; 6:30 pm		at Nevada	L 73–90	5–7 (0–1)	Lawlor Events Center (1,158); Reno, NV
12/30/2017; 12:00 pm		at Air Force	W 64–58	6–7 (1–1)	Clune Arena (407); Colorado Springs, CO
01/03/2018; 7:00 pm		Utah State	W 57–56	7–7 (2–1)	Save Mart Center (2,904); Fresno, CA
01/10/2018; 2:00 pm		at Boise State	L 66–75	8–8 (3–2)	Taco Bell Arena (568); Boise, ID
01/13/2018; 1:00 pm		at New Mexico	L 75–88	8–9 (3–3)	Dreamstyle Arena (5,881); Albuquerque, NM
01/17/2018; 7:00 pm		San Diego State	W 64–53	9–9 (4–3)	Save Mart Center (2,122); Fresno, CA
01/24/2018; 6:00 pm		at UNLV	W 74–72	10–9 (5–3)	Cox Pavilion (528); Paradise, NV
01/27/2018; 1:00 pm		at Utah State	L 52–60	10–10 (5–4)	Smith Spectrum (461); Logan, UT
01/29/2018; 7:00 pm		Air Force	W 64–48	11–10 (6–4)	Save Mart Center (2,162); Fresno, CA
01/31/2018; 7:00 pm		Nevada	W 68–55	12–10 (7–4)	Save Mart Center (2,045); Fresno, CA
02/03/2018; 2:00 pm		Wyoming	W 60–47	13–10 (8–4)	Save Mart Center (2,174); Fresno, CA
02/07/2018; 12:00 pm		at San Diego State	W 66–60	14–10 (9–4)	Viejas Arena (4,306); San Diego, CA
02/14/2018; 7:00 pm		San Jose State	W 81–71	15–10 (10–4)	Save Mart Center (2,108); Fresno, CA
02/17/2018; 2:00 pm		at Colorado State	W 74–65	16–10 (11–4)	Moby Arena (1,999); Fort Collins, CO
02/21/2018; 7:00 pm		UNLV	L 58–73	16–11 (11–5)	Save Mart Center (2,204); Fresno, CA
02/24/2018; 1:00 pm		at Wyoming	L 57–71	16–12 (11–6)	Arena-Auditorium (3,021); Laramie, WY
03/02/2018; 1:00 pm		New Mexico	L 89–93	16–13 (11–7)	Save Mart Center (2,401); Fresno, CA
Mountain West tournament
03/06/2018; 2:30 pm	(4)	vs. (5) Colorado State; Quarterfinals	L 55–71	16–14	Thomas & Mack Center (1,293); Paradise, NV
WBI
03/14/2018*; 7:00 pm		at Cal State Bakersfield; First Round	W 77–66	17–14	Icardo Center (1,604); Bakersfield, CA
03/19/2018*; 7:00 pm		Nevada; Quarterfinals	L 74–86	17–15	Save Mart Center (662); Fresno, CA
*Non-conference game. ^{#}Rankings from AP Poll. (#) Tournament seedings in parentheses. All times are in Pacific Time.

== See also ==
- 2017–18 Fresno State Bulldogs men's basketball team
