= Chris Gobrecht =

American basketball coach (born 1955)

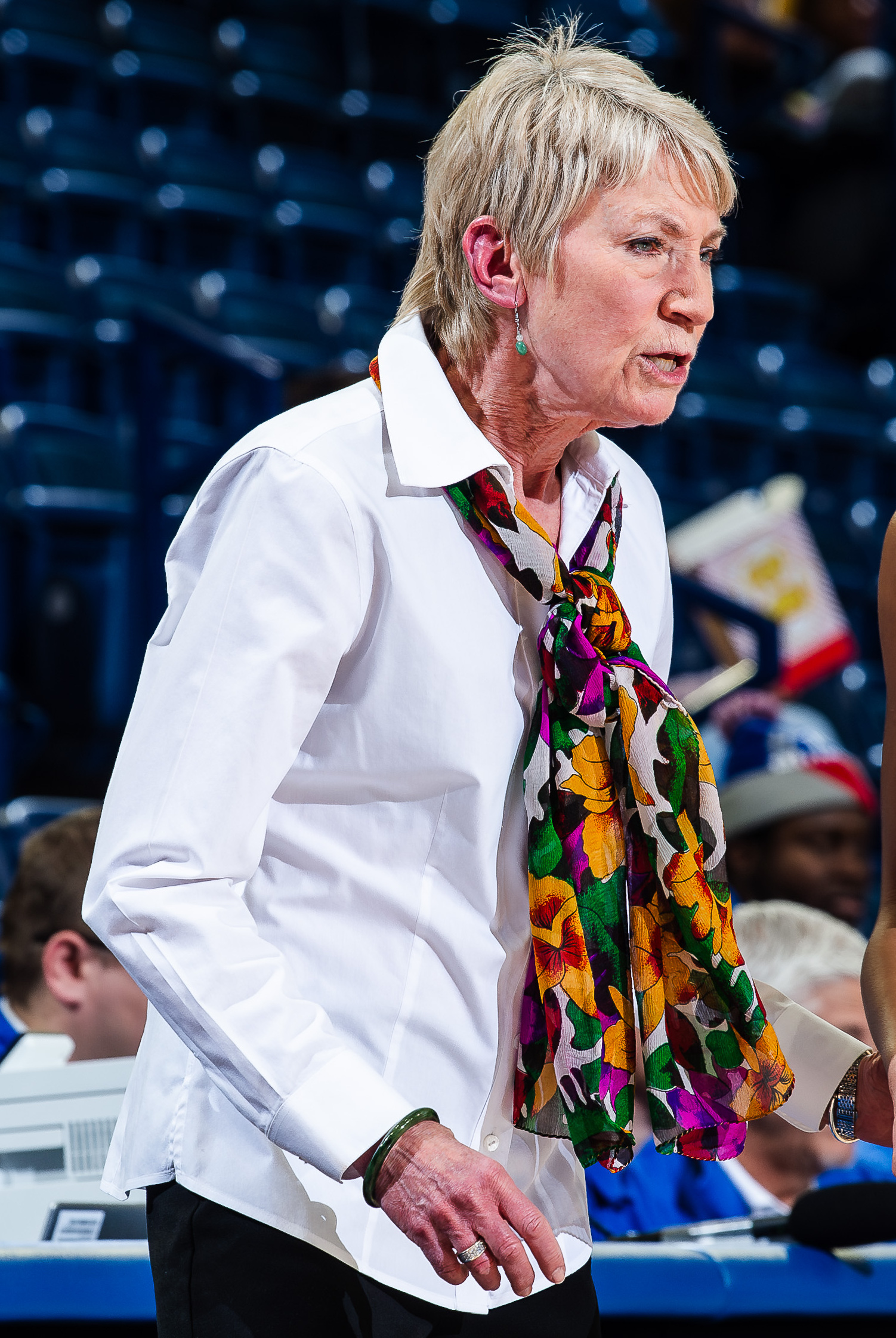
- Gobrecht in 2023

Biographical details
- Born: February 9, 1955 (age 71); Toledo, Ohio, U.S.

Playing career
- 1973–1976: USC

Coaching career (HC unless noted)
- 1977–1978: Santa Fe Springs HS
- 1978–1979: Pasadena CC
- 1979–1985: Cal State Fullerton
- 1985–1996: Washington
- 1996–1997: Florida State
- 1997–2004: USC
- 2005–2015: Yale
- 2015–2024: Air Force

Head coaching record
- Overall: 20–4 (.833) (high school); 25–5 (.833) (junior college); 626–662 (.486) (college)
- Tournaments: 16–9 (NCAA); 3–4 (WNIT); 2–1 (NWIT)

Accomplishments and honors

Championships
- 2× Pac-10 (1988, 1990); NorPac (1986)

Awards
- 2× Pac-10 Coach of the Year (1987, 1988); MW Coach of the Year (2022)

Christianne Geiger Gobrecht (born February 9, 1955) is an American basketball coach who was most recently the head coach of the United States Air Force Academy women's basketball team. A coach since 1977, she has been a head coach at the high school, junior college, and NCAA levels, and is known for only hiring female assistant coaches in order to protect opportunities for women.

== Coaching career ==
Gobrecht began her coaching career at Santa Fe Springs High School for one season before named the head coach at Pasadena City College, where she won a conference championship in her lone season there. She was also the head coach at Cal State Fullerton for six seasons prior to accepting the head coaching position at Washington, where she won two Pac-10 Conference titles and was named Pac-10 coach of the year twice. She was also the head coach at Florida State for one season prior to joining her alma mater USC in 1997. She led the Trojans to two WNIT appearances before she was fired at the end of the 2003–04 season. Gobrecht took the 2004–05 season off to spend time with family, accepting the head coaching position at Yale in 2005.

Gobrecht was named the head coach at Air Force on April 14, 2015. She signed a contract extension after the 2017–18 season that extended her contract through the 2022–23 season.

In 2022, the Mountain West Conference named Gobrecht the Coach of the Year in women's basketball after Air Force finished the regular season 17–12 (11–7 MW), the program's first winning season since it moved from Division II to Division I in 1996. After advancing to the second round of the 2022 Women's National Invitation Tournament, Air Force finished the 2021–22 season 19–12 overall.

On April 1, 2024, Gobrecht announced her retirement from coaching after a 44-year college basketball career.

== Head coaching record ==
Record table
Season	Team	Overall	Conference	Standing	Postseason
Cal State Fullerton Titans (Pacific Coast Athletic Association) (1979–1985)
1979–80	Cal State Fullerton	7–23	2–10		
1980–81	Cal State Fullerton	10–20	2–10	6th	
1981–82	Cal State Fullerton	18–12	3–9	6th	
1982–83	Cal State Fullerton	13–15	3–11	6th	
1983–84	Cal State Fullerton	17–11	7–7	4th	
1984–85	Cal State Fullerton	19–11	8–6	5th	NWIT Fifth Place
Cal State Fullerton:		84–92 (.477)	25–53 (.321)		
Washington Huskies (Northern Pacific Conference) (1985–1986)
1985–86	Washington	24–6	11–2	1st	NCAA Division I Second Round
Washington Huskies (Pac-10 Conference) (1986–1996)
1986–87	Washington	23–7	14–4	2nd	NCAA Division I Second Round
1987–88	Washington	25–5	16–2	1st	NCAA Division I Sweet Sixteen
1988–89	Washington	23–10	15–3	2nd	NCAA Division I Second Round
1989–90	Washington	28–3	17–1	1st	NCAA Division I Elite Eight
1990–91	Washington	24–5	15–3	2nd	NCAA Division I Sweet Sixteen
1991–92	Washington	17–11	9–9	6th	
1992–93	Washington	17–12	11–7	3rd	NCAA Division I Second Round
1993–94	Washington	21–8	12–6	4th	NCAA Division I Second Round
1994–95	Washington	25–9	13–5	2nd	NCAA Division I Sweet Sixteen
1995–96	Washington	16–13	10–8	T–3rd	
Washington:		243–89 (.732)	143–50 (.741)		
Florida State Seminoles (Atlantic Coast Conference) (1996–1997)
1996–97	Florida State	5–22	0–16	9th	
Florida State:		5–22 (.185)	0–16 (.000)		
USC Trojans (Pac-10 Conference) (1997–2004)
1997–98	USC	12–15	7–11	6th	
1998–99	USC	7–20	3–15	T–9th	
1999–2000	USC	16–14	10–8	T–6th	WNIT Second Round
2000–01	USC	13–15	8–10	T–6th	
2001–02	USC	16–14	11–7	T–4th	WNIT Second Round
2002–03	USC	14–17	8–10	T–5th	
2003–04	USC	15–13	11–7	T–3rd	
USC:		93–108 (.463)	58–68 (.460)		
Yale Bulldogs (Ivy League) (2005–2015)
2005–06	Yale	3–24	2–12	8th	
2006–07	Yale	12–16	5–9	6th	
2007–08	Yale	9–18	7–7	T–4th	
2008–09	Yale	11–17	4–10	7th	
2009–10	Yale	13–15	8–6	4th	
2010–11	Yale	14–15	10–4	T–2nd	WNIT First Round
2011–12	Yale	16–12	8–6	3rd	
2012–13	Yale	13–15	8–6	4th	
2013–14	Yale	13–15	7–7	4th	
2014–15	Yale	13–15	7–7	4th	
Yale:		117–162 (.419)	66–74 (.471)		
Air Force Falcons (Mountain West Conference) (2015–2024)
2015–16	Air Force	1–29	1–17	11th	
2016–17	Air Force	4–25	2–16	11th	
2017–18	Air Force	6–25	5–13	10th	
2018–19	Air Force	8–22	4–14	10th	
2019–20	Air Force	10–21	7–11	T–6th	
2020–21	Air Force	8–18	4–14	9th	
2021–22	Air Force	19–14	11–7	5th	WNIT Second Round
2022–23	Air Force	13–18	8–10	7th	
2023–24	Air Force	15–17	8–10	8th	
Air Force:		84–189 (.308)	50–112 (.309)		
Total:		626–662 (.486)			
National champion Postseason invitational champion Conference regular season champion Conference regular season and conference tournament champion Division regular season champion Division regular season and conference tournament champion Conference tournament champion

== Personal life ==
Gobrecht was married to Bob Gobrecht, who died in 2018 from an undisclosed illness. The couple had two children; Eric and Mady. Eric attended the Air Force Academy and is a Major stationed at Beale Air Force Base in California, while Mady played for her mother at Yale and is currently a nurse in Colorado Springs.

== See also ==
- List of college women's basketball career coaching wins leaders
