= 2017–18 New Mexico Lobos women's basketball team =

Intercollegiate basketball season

2017–18 New Mexico Lobos women's basketball

WNIT, Third Round
- Conference: Mountain West Conference
- Record: 25–11 (10–8 Mountain West)
- Head coach: Mike Bradbury (2nd season)
- Assistant coaches: Valerie King; Erin Grant; Bill Ferrara
- Home arena: Dreamstyle Arena; Johnson Gymnasium

2017–18 Mountain West Conference women's basketball standings
| | Conf. | | | | Overall |
| Team | W | | L | PCT | W | | L | PCT |
|---|---|---|---|---|---|---|---|---|
| Boise State † | 14 | – | 4 | .778 | 23 | – | 10 | .697 |
| UNLV | 14 | – | 4 | .778 | 19 | – | 12 | .613 |
| Wyoming | 13 | – | 5 | .722 | 22 | – | 11 | .667 |
| Colorado State | 11 | – | 7 | .611 | 21 | – | 12 | .636 |
| Fresno State | 11 | – | 7 | .611 | 17 | – | 15 | .531 |
| New Mexico | 10 | – | 8 | .556 | 25 | – | 11 | .694 |
| Nevada | 7 | – | 11 | .389 | 19 | – | 17 | .528 |
| San Diego State | 5 | – | 13 | .278 | 11 | – | 19 | .367 |
| Utah State | 5 | – | 13 | .278 | 7 | – | 23 | .233 |
| Air Force | 5 | – | 13 | .278 | 6 | – | 25 | .194 |
| San Jose State | 4 | – | 14 | .222 | 7 | – | 23 | .233 |
† 2018 MW Tournament winner Rankings from AP poll

The 2017–18 New Mexico Lobos women's basketball team represented the University of New Mexico during the 2017–18 NCAA Division I women's basketball season. The Lobos, led by second year head coach Mike Bradbury, played their home games at Dreamstyle Arena with 1 game in the WNIT at Johnson Gymnasium and were a member of the Mountain West Conference. They finished the season 25–11, 10–8 in Mountain West play to finish in sixth place. They advanced to the quarterfinals of the Mountain West Conference women's basketball tournament, where they lost to Wyoming. They received an at-large bid to the Women's National Invitation Tournament, where they defeated St. Mary's and Rice in the first and second rounds before losing to TCU in the third round.

== Roster ==
2017–18 New Mexico Lobos women's basketball team
Players
Coaches

| Pos. | # | Name | Height | Year | Previous school | Hometown |
|---|---|---|---|---|---|---|
| G | 0 | Cherise Beynon | 5 ft 10 in (1.78 m) | Sr | Canyon Springs HS | Las Vegas, NV |
| G | 2 | Tesha Buck | 6 ft 0 in (1.83 m) | RS Sr | Red Wing; Green Bay | Red Wing, MN |
| G | 3 | N'Dea Flye | 5 ft 7 in (1.7 m) | Fr | Oregon City HS | Oregon City, OR |
| G | 4 | Alex Lapeyrolerie | 5 ft 11 in (1.8 m) | RS Sr | Edward S. Marcus HS | Highland Village, TX |
| G | 10 | Jasmine Smith | 5 ft 7 in (1.7 m) | Fr | Dekaney HS | Houston, TX |
| G | 11 | Emily Lines | 6 ft 1 in (1.85 m) | Jr | First Baptist Academy | Naples, FL |
| G | 15 | Aisia Robertson (redshirt) | 5 ft 8 in (1.73 m) | RS Jr | Bishop O'Dowd HS; Kansas | San Francisco, CA |
| G | 22 | Mykiel Burleson | 5 ft 11 in (1.8 m) | So | Pflugerville HS | Pflugerville, TX |
| G | 23 | Jaedyn De La Cerda | 5 ft 6 in (1.68 m) | Fr | Roswell HS | Roswell, NM |
| C | 24 | Erica Moore | 6 ft 2 in (1.88 m) | RS Jr | Mount Vernon; Purdue | Fortville, IN |
| G | 25 | Laneah Bryan | 5 ft 6 in (1.68 m) | Sr | Franklin HS | El Paso, TX |
| F | 32 | Antonia Anderson | 6 ft 2 in (1.88 m) | Fr | Byron P. Steele II HS | Cibolo, TX |
| G | 35 | Madi Washington | 5 ft 9 in (1.75 m) | Fr | Red Oak HS | Red Oak, TX |
| C | 44 | Jaisa Nunn | 6 ft 3 in (1.91 m) | Jr | Juanita HS | Kirkland, WA |

Head coach

- Mike Bradbury (Chattanooga)

Assistant coach(es)

- Valerie King (Cincinnati)
- Erin Grant (Texas Tech)
- Bill Ferrara (Florida)

Legend

- (C) Team captain
- (S) Suspended
- (I) Ineligible
- (W) Walk-on
- Injured
- Current redshirt

Roster

== Schedule and results ==
| Date time, TV | Rank^{#} | Opponent^{#} | Result | Record | Site (attendance) city, state |
Exhibition
| 11/01/2017*; 7:00 pm | | Eastern New Mexico | W 80–66 | | Dreamstyle Arena (4,016); Albuquerque, NM |
| 11/05/2017*; 2:00 pm | | Fort Lewis | W 84–68 | | Dreamstyle Arena (4,153); Albuquerque, NM |
Non-conference regular season
| 11/10/2017*; 7:00 pm | | Western Michigan | W 88–76 | 1–0 | Dreamstyle Arena (4,145); Albuquerque, NM |
| 11/13/2017*; 7:00 pm | | No. 18 Marquette | W 88–87 | 2–0 | Dreamstyle Arena (4,169); Albuquerque, NM |
| 11/15/2017*; 7:00 pm | | Northern New Mexico | W 107–66 | 3–0 | Dreamstyle Arena (4,314); Albuquerque, NM |
| 11/18/2017*; 2:00 pm | | New Mexico State; Rio Grande Rivalry | W 86–75 | 4–0 | Dreamstyle Arena (5,082); Albuquerque, NM |
| 11/24/2017*; 7:00 pm | | Wichita State; UNM Thanksgiving Tournament | W 76–62 | 5–0 | Dreamstyle Arena (4,560); Albuquerque, NM |
| 11/25/2017*; 2:30 pm | | UC Irvine; UNM Thanksgiving Tournament | W 83–61 | 6–0 | Dreamstyle Arena (4,425); Albuquerque, NM |
| 11/26/2017*; 2:30 pm | | Illinois; UNM Thanksgiving Tournament | W 97–68 | 7–0 | Dreamstyle Arena (4,663); Albuquerque, NM |
| 11/30/2017*; 5:30 pm | | at UTEP | W 59–35 | 8–0 | Don Haskins Center (1,350); El Paso, TX |
| 12/02/2017*; 11:00 am | | at New Mexico State; Rio Grande Rivalry | W 101–93 | 9–0 | Pan American Center (763); Las Cruces, NM |
| 12/06/2017*; 7:00 pm | | Texas Tech | W 90–56 | 10–0 | Dreamstyle Arena (5,663); Albuquerque, NM |
| 12/10/2017*; 1:00 pm | | Navy | W 94–87 | 11–0 | Dreamstyle Arena (6,763); Albuquerque, NM |
| 12/16/2017*; 2:00 pm | | at Oklahoma | L 63–105 | 11–1 | Lloyd Noble Center (4,508); Norman, OK |
| 12/20/2017*; 7:00 pm | | Lamar | W 90–58 | 12-1 | Dreamstyle Arena (5,081); Albuquerque, NM |
Mountain West regular season
| 12/28/2017; 6:00 pm | | at Air Force | W 88–59 | 13–1 (1–0) | Clune Arena (312); Colorado Springs, CO |
| 12/30/2017; 1:00 pm | | Nevada | W 72–68 | 14–1 (2–0) | Dreamstyle Arena (6,342); Albuquerque, NM |
| 01/03/2018; 7:00 pm | | Boise State | W 100–83 | 15–1 (3–0) | Dreamstyle Arena (5,367); Albuquerque, NM |
| 01/08/2018; 3:00 pm | | at San José State | L 86–95 | 15–2 (3–1) | Event Center Arena (836); San Jose, CA |
| 01/10/2018; 6:30 pm | | at Wyoming | L 55–66 | 15–3 (3–2) | Arena-Auditorium (2,105); Laramie, WY |
| 01/13/2018; 2:00 pm | | Fresno State | W 88–75 | 16–3 (4–2) | Dreamstyle Arena (5,881); Albuquerque, NM |
| 01/17/2018; 7:00 pm | | UNLV | L 66–68 | 16–4 (4–3) | Dreamstyle Arena (5,786); Albuquerque, NM |
| 01/20/2018; 2:00 pm | | at San Diego State | L 89–97 | 16–5 (4–4) | Viejas Arena (886); San Diego, CA |
| 01/27/2018; 2:00 pm | | at Colorado State | L 71–74 ^{OT} | 16–6 (4–5) | Moby Arena (1,624); Fort Collins, CO |
| 01/31/2018; 7:00 pm | | Utah State | W 80–47 | 17–6 (5–5) | Dreamstyle Arena (4,472); Albuquerque, NM |
| 02/03/2018; 2:00 pm | | San José State | W 92–62 | 18–6 (6–5) | Dreamstyle Arena (5,403); Albuquerque, NM |
| 02/07/2018; 7:00 pm | | at Boise State | L 85–91 | 18–7 (6–6) | Taco Bell Arena (610); Boise, ID |
| 02/10/2018; 2:00 pm | | Air Force | W 57–49 | 19–7 (7–6) | Dreamstyle Arena (5,369); Albuquerque, NM |
| 02/14/2018; 7:00 pm | | at Utah State | W 74–50 | 20–7 (8–6) | Smith Spectrum (286); Logan, UT |
| 02/21/2018; 7:00 pm | | Wyoming | L 62–63 | 20–8 (8–7) | Dreamstyle Arena (4,769); Albuquerque, NM |
| 02/24/2018; 4:00 pm | | at UNLV | L 62–74 | 20–9 (8–8) | Cox Pavilion (1,065); Paradise, NV |
| 02/27/2018; 7:00 pm | | Colorado State | W 54–48 | 21–9 (9–8) | Dreamstyle Arena (5,088); Albuquerque, NM |
| 03/02/2018; 8:00 pm | | at Fresno State | W 93–89 | 22–9 (10–8) | Save Mart Center (2,401); Fresno, CA |
Mountain West Women's Tournament
| 03/05/2018; 8:00 pm | (6) | vs. (11) San José State; First Round | W 84–54 | 23–9 | Thomas & Mack Center (1,542); Paradise, NV |
| 03/06/2018; 9:30 pm | (6) | vs. (3) Wyoming; Quarterfinals | L 66–69 | 23–10 | Thomas & Mack Center (2,273); Paradise, NV |
WNIT
| 03/15/2018*; 7:00 pm, Stadium | | Saint Mary's; First Round | W 82–80 | 24–10 | Johnson Gymnasium (1,428); Albuquerque, NM |
| 03/20/2018*; 7:00 pm | | Rice; Second Round | W 93–73 | 25–10 | Dreamstyle Arena (3,302); Albuquerque, NM |
| 03/22/2018*; 7:00 pm | | TCU; Third Round | L 72–81 | 25–11 | Dreamstyle Arena (3,938); Albuquerque, NM |
*Non-conference game. ^{#}Rankings from AP Poll. (#) Tournament seedings in parentheses. All times are in Mountain Time.

== Rankings ==
2017–18 NCAA Division I women's basketball rankings

Regular season polls
| Poll | Pre- season | Week 2 | Week 3 | Week 4 | Week 5 | Week 6 | Week 7 | Week 8 | Week 9 | Week 10 | Week 11 | Week 12 | Week 13 | Week 14 | Week 15 | Week 16 | Week 17 | Week 18 | Week 19 | Final |
|---|---|---|---|---|---|---|---|---|---|---|---|---|---|---|---|---|---|---|---|---|
| AP | | | RV | RV | RV | RV | RV | RV | RV | | | | | | | | | | | N/A |
| Coaches | | | | RV | RV | RV | RV | RV | RV | | | | | | | | | | | |

Legend
| | Increase in ranking |
| | Decrease in ranking |
| | Not ranked previous week |
| (RV) | Received Votes |
| (NR) | Not Ranked |

== See also ==
2017-18 New Mexico Lobos men's basketball team
