= 2017–18 Air Force Falcons women's basketball team =

Intercollegiate basketball season

2017–18 Air Force Falcons women's basketball
- Conference: Mountain West Conference
- Record: 6–25 (5–13 Mountain West)
- Head coach: Chris Gobrecht (3rd season)
- Assistant coaches: Stacy McIntyre; Erin Mills-Reid; Clare Fitzpatrick; Rynae Rasley
- Home arena: Clune Arena

2017–18 Mountain West Conference women's basketball standings
| | Conf. | | | | Overall |
| Team | W | | L | PCT | W | | L | PCT |
|---|---|---|---|---|---|---|---|---|
| Boise State † | 14 | – | 4 | .778 | 23 | – | 10 | .697 |
| UNLV | 14 | – | 4 | .778 | 19 | – | 12 | .613 |
| Wyoming | 13 | – | 5 | .722 | 22 | – | 11 | .667 |
| Colorado State | 11 | – | 7 | .611 | 21 | – | 12 | .636 |
| Fresno State | 11 | – | 7 | .611 | 17 | – | 15 | .531 |
| New Mexico | 10 | – | 8 | .556 | 25 | – | 11 | .694 |
| Nevada | 7 | – | 11 | .389 | 19 | – | 17 | .528 |
| San Diego State | 5 | – | 13 | .278 | 11 | – | 19 | .367 |
| Utah State | 5 | – | 13 | .278 | 7 | – | 23 | .233 |
| Air Force | 5 | – | 13 | .278 | 6 | – | 25 | .194 |
| San Jose State | 4 | – | 14 | .222 | 7 | – | 23 | .233 |
† 2018 MW Tournament winner Rankings from AP poll

The 2017–18 Air Force Falcons women's basketball team represented the United States Air Force Academy during the 2017–18 NCAA Division I women's basketball season. The Falcons, led by third year head coach Chris Gobrecht, played their home games at the Clune Arena on the Air Force Academy's main campus in Colorado Springs, Colorado and are members of the Mountain West Conference. They finished the season 6–25, 5–13 in Mountain West play to finish in a three way tie for eighth place. They advanced to the quarterfinals of the Mountain West women's tournament, where they lost to Boise State.

== Previous season ==
They finished the season 4–25, 2–16 in Mountain West play to finish in last place. They lost in the first round of the Mountain West women's tournament to Utah.

== Roster ==
2017–18 Air Force Falcons women's basketball team
Players
Coaches

| Pos. | # | Name | Height | Year | Previous school | Hometown |
|---|---|---|---|---|---|---|
| G/F | 0 | Dee Bennett | 6 ft 0 in (1.83 m) | Sr | Miami Norland Senior | Miami, FL |
| G | 4 | Alexis Springfield | 5 ft 6 in (1.68 m) | Fr | Mesquite | Gilbert, AZ |
| G | 5 | Kennedy Beale | 5 ft 6 in (1.68 m) | Fr | Cape Henry Collegiate | Norfolk, VA |
| G | 10 | Venessannah Itugbu | 5 ft 9 in (1.75 m) | Jr | Mesa Ridge | Colorado Springs, CO |
| G | 11 | Cortney Porter | 5 ft 9 in (1.75 m) | Sr | Bonneville | Ogden, UT |
| G/F | 12 | Jenn Urbaniak | 6 ft 0 in (1.83 m) | So | Palmer | Colorado Springs, CO |
| G | 13 | Emily Conroe | 5 ft 10 in (1.78 m) | Fr | FHSAA | Fredericksburg, VA |
| G | 14 | Noelle Tomes | 5 ft 8 in (1.73 m) | Fr | East Ridge | Woodbury, MN |
| G | 20 | Sophie Bynum | 6 ft 1 in (1.85 m) | Fr | Wilsonville | Wilsonville, OR |
| F | 21 | Michaela McFalls | 5 ft 11 in (1.8 m) | Fr | Lenoir City | Lenoir City, TN |
| G | 22 | Sarah Pierce | 5 ft 7 in (1.7 m) | So | Community | Unionville, TN |
| G | 24 | Sierra Rains | 5 ft 9 in (1.75 m) | Fr | Horizon Christian | San Diego, CA |
| F | 25 | Erika Chapman | 5 ft 10 in (1.78 m) | Sr | Byron P. Steele | Cibolo, TX |
| F | 30 | Naomi Hughes | 6 ft 0 in (1.83 m) | Fr | Grovetown | Grovetown, GA |
| G | 32 | Kaelin Immel | 5 ft 9 in (1.75 m) | Fr | Southridge | Beaverton, OR |
| F | 55 | Kassady Huffman | 6 ft 2 in (1.88 m) | So | Air Academy | Colorado Springs, CO |

Head coach

- Chris Gobrecht (USC)

Assistant coach(es)

- Stacy McIntyre (Kentucky)
- Erin Mills-Reid (Fairleigh Dickinson)
- Clare Fitzpatrick (Cornell)
- Rynae Rasley (CCNY)

Legend

- (C) Team captain
- (S) Suspended
- (I) Ineligible
- (W) Walk-on
- Injured
- Current redshirt

Roster
Last update: January 6, 2018

== Schedule and results ==
| Date time, TV | Rank^{#} | Opponent^{#} | Result | Record | Site (attendance) city, state |
Non-conference regular season
| 11/10/2017*; 7:00 pm | | Denver | L 54–75 | 0–1 | Clune Arena (427); Colorado Springs, CO |
| 11/14/2017*; 7:00 pm | | Eastern Washington | L 63–65 ^{OT} | 0–2 | Clune Arena (342); Colorado Springs, CO |
| 11/17/2017*; 6:00 pm | | at SIU Edwardsville | L 40–76 | 0–3 | Vadalabene Center (838); Edwardsville, IL |
| 11/19/2017*; 12:00 pm | | at FIU | L 69–70 | 0–4 | FIU Arena (310); Miami, FL |
| 11/22/2017*; 3:00 pm | | at Navy | L 64–71 | 0–5 | Alumni Hall (1,242); Annapolis, MD |
| 11/29/2017*; 7:00 pm | | Colorado Christian | L 66–68 | 0–6 | Clune Arena (287); Colorado Springs, CO |
| 12/02/2017*; 1:00 pm | | Army | L 59–65 | 0–7 | Clune Arena (634); Colorado Springs, CO |
| 12/07/2017*; 7:00 pm | | at Utah Valley | L 56–59 | 0–8 | UCCU Center (202); Orem, UT |
| 12/09/2017*; 2:00 pm | | at Weber State | L 52–62 | 0–9 | Dee Events Center (863); Ogden, UT |
| 12/15/2017*; 7:00 pm | | Colorado | L 43–68 | 0–10 | Clune Arena (287); Colorado Springs, CO |
| 12/15/2017*; 1:00 pm | | No. 3 Louisville | L 50–62 | 0–11 | Clune Arena (537); Colorado Springs, CO |
Mountain West regular season
| 12/28/2017; 6:00 pm | | New Mexico | L 59–88 | 0–12 (0–1) | Clune Arena (312); Colorado Springs, CO |
| 12/30/2017; 1:00 pm | | Fresno State | L 58–64 | 0–13 (0–2) | Clune Arena (407); Colorado Springs, CO |
| 01/06/2018; 3:00 pm | | at Nevada | L 60–70 | 0–14 (0–3) | Lawlor Events Center (1,170); Reno, NV |
| 01/10/2018; 7:00 pm | | at UNLV | L 58–69 | 0–15 (0–4) | Cox Pavilion (508); Paradise, NV |
| 01/13/2018; 1:00 pm | | San Jose State | L 74–75 | 0–16 (0–5) | Clune Arena (459); Colorado Springs, CO |
| 01/17/2018; 7:00 pm | | Colorado State | L 39–40 | 0–17 (0–6) | Clune Arena (323); Colorado Springs, CO |
| 01/24/2018; 7:00 pm | | Utah State | W 57–50 | 1–17 (1–6) | Clune Arena (253); Colorado Springs, CO |
| 01/27/2018; 7:00 pm | | at Boise State | W 57–50 | 1–18 (1–7) | Taco Bell Arena (1,045); Boise, ID |
| 01/29/2018; 8:00 pm | | at Fresno State | L 48–64 | 1–19 (1–8) | Save Mart Center (2,162); Fresno, CA |
| 02/03/2018; 1:00 pm | | San Diego State | W 61–51 | 2–19 (2–8) | Clune Arena (918); Colorado Springs, CO |
| 02/07/2018; 7:00 pm | | at Colorado State | L 50–61 | 2–20 (2–9) | Moby Arena (1,137); Fort Collins, CO |
| 02/10/2017; 2:00 pm | | at New Mexico | L 49–57 | 2–21 (2–10) | Dreamstyle Arena (5,369); Albuquerque, NM |
| 02/14/2018; 7:00 pm | | UNLV | L 59–67 | 2–22 (2–11) | Clune Arena (263); Colorado Springs, CO |
| 02/17/2018; 1:00 pm | | Boise State | L 48–57 | 2–23 (2–12) | Clune Arena (627); Colorado Springs, CO |
| 02/21/2018; 7:30 pm | | at San Diego State | W 56–48 | 3–23 (3–12) | Viejas Arena (414); San Diego, CA |
| 02/24/2018; 2:00 pm | | at Utah State | L 55–57 | 3–24 (3–13) | Smith Spectrum (327); Logan, UT |
| 02/27/2018; 7:00 pm | | Wyoming | W 57–47 | 4–24 (4–13) | Clune Arena (237); Colorado Springs, CO |
| 03/02/2018; 8:00 pm | | at San Jose State | W 66–60 | 5–24 (5–13) | Event Center Arena (829); San Jose, CA |
Mountain West Women's Tournament
| 03/05/2018; 3:00 pm | (8) | vs. (9) Utah State; First Round | W 68–54 | 6–24 | Thomas & Mack Center; Paradise, NV |
| 03/06/2018; 1:00 pm | (8) | vs. (1) Boise State; Quarterfinals | L 46–60 | 6–25 | Thomas & Mack Center; Paradise, NV |
*Non-conference game. ^{#}Rankings from AP Poll. (#) Tournament seedings in parentheses. All times are in Mountain Time.

== See also ==
2017–18 Air Force Falcons men's basketball team
