= 2017–18 Nevada Wolf Pack women's basketball team =

Intercollegiate basketball season

2017–18 Nevada Wolf Pack women's basketball

Nugget Classic Champions

WBI, Semifinals
- Conference: Mountain West Conference
- Record: 19–17 (7–11 MW)
- Head coach: Amanda Levens (1st season)
- Assistant coaches: Laura Gonsalves; Shannon Gholar; Sybil Dosty
- Home arena: Lawlor Events Center

2017–18 Mountain West Conference women's basketball standings
| | Conf. | | | | Overall |
| Team | W | | L | PCT | W | | L | PCT |
|---|---|---|---|---|---|---|---|---|
| Boise State † | 14 | – | 4 | .778 | 23 | – | 10 | .697 |
| UNLV | 14 | – | 4 | .778 | 19 | – | 12 | .613 |
| Wyoming | 13 | – | 5 | .722 | 22 | – | 11 | .667 |
| Colorado State | 11 | – | 7 | .611 | 21 | – | 12 | .636 |
| Fresno State | 11 | – | 7 | .611 | 17 | – | 15 | .531 |
| New Mexico | 10 | – | 8 | .556 | 25 | – | 11 | .694 |
| Nevada | 7 | – | 11 | .389 | 19 | – | 17 | .528 |
| San Diego State | 5 | – | 13 | .278 | 11 | – | 19 | .367 |
| Utah State | 5 | – | 13 | .278 | 7 | – | 23 | .233 |
| Air Force | 5 | – | 13 | .278 | 6 | – | 25 | .194 |
| San Jose State | 4 | – | 14 | .222 | 7 | – | 23 | .233 |
† 2018 MW Tournament winner Rankings from AP poll

The 2017–18 Nevada Wolf Pack women's basketball team represented the University of Nevada, Reno during the 2017–18 NCAA Division I women's basketball season. The Wolf Pack, led by first year head coach Amanda Levens, played their home games at the Lawlor Events Center and were members of the Mountain West Conference. They finished the season 19–17, 7–11 in Mountain West play to finish in seventh place. They advanced to the championship of the Mountain West women's tournament, where they lost to Boise State. They received an invite to the WBI, where they defeated UC Irvine and Mountain West member Fresno State in the first round and quarterfinals before losing to Central Arkansas in the semifinals.

== Roster ==
2017–18 Nevada Wolf Pack women's basketball team
Players
Coaches

| Pos. | # | Name | Height | Year | Previous school | Hometown |
|---|---|---|---|---|---|---|
| G | 0 | Janelle Sumilong | 5 ft 8 in (1.73 m) | Fr | Hanford HS | Hanford, CA |
| G | 1 | Ashlee Jones | 5 ft 9 in (1.75 m) | RS Sr | Bradshaw Christian HS | Sacramento, CA |
| F | 3 | Teige Zeller | 6 ft 2 in (1.88 m) | Sr | Los Lunas HS | Los Lunas, NM |
| G | 4 | Halie Bergman | 5 ft 10 in (1.78 m) | RS Sr | Turlock HS; Pacific | Turlock, CA |
| F | 11 | Terae Briggs | 6 ft 3 in (1.91 m) | Jr | Pleanty Coups HS; United Tribes Technical College | Pryor, MT |
| G | 12 | MorningRose Tobey | 5 ft 7 in (1.7 m) | Jr | Billings West HS | Billings, MT |
| G | 13 | T Moe | 5 ft 8 in (1.73 m) | RS Sr | Terra Nova HS | Daly City, CA |
| G | 14 | Delaney Gosse | 6 ft 1 in (1.85 m) | Jr | The Meadows School | Las Vegas, NV |
| G | 22 | Sami Dinan | 5 ft 5 in (1.65 m) | So | North Valleys HS | Reno, NV |
| G | 24 | Camariah King | 5 ft 6 in (1.68 m) | RS So | Holy Names Academy | Seattle, WA |
| F | 32 | A. J. Cephas | 6 ft 0 in (1.83 m) | RS Jr | Deer Valley HS | Antioch, CA |
| G | 34 | Jade Redmon | 5 ft 7 in (1.7 m) | Sr | Mead HS; Eastern Washington | Spokane, WA |
| F | 35 | Kristin Dearth | 6 ft 3 in (1.91 m) | RS So | Cibola; Seattle | Corrales, NM |

Head coach

- Amanda Levens (Arizona State)

Assistant coach(es)

- Laura Gonsalves (Washington)
- Shannon Gholar (Cal Poly)
- Sybil Dosty (Arizona State)

Legend

- (C) Team captain
- (S) Suspended
- (I) Ineligible
- (W) Walk-on
- Injured
- Current redshirt

Roster
Last update: September 8, 2017

== Schedule ==
| Date time, TV | Rank^{#} | Opponent^{#} | Result | Record | Site (attendance) city, state |
Non-conference regular season
| 11/10/2017*; 4:30 pm | | at Utah | L 61–87 | 0–1 | Jon M. Huntsman Center (1,659); Salt Lake City, UT |
| 11/12/2017*; 2:00 pm | | Portland State | W 67–55 | 1–1 | Lawlor Events Center (1,140); Reno, NV |
| 11/15/2017*; 6:30 pm | | Pepperdine | L 72–77 | 1–2 | Lawlor Events Center (1,025); Reno, NV |
| 11/24/2017*; 2:00 pm | | Sacramento State; Nugget Classic semifinals | W 95–68 | 2–2 | Lawlor Events Center (1,358); Reno, NV |
| 11/26/2017*; 2:00 pm | | SMU; Nugget Classic championship | W 80–72 | 3–2 | Lawlor Events Center (1,586); Reno, NV |
| 11/28/2017*; 6:00 pm, CBSSN | | No. 1 Connecticut | L 57–88 | 3–3 | Lawlor Events Center (7,815); Reno, NV |
| 12/01/2017*; 9:00 pm | | vs. No. 21 Oregon State; Maui Classic | L 49–89 | 3–4 | War Memorial Gym (785); Maui, HI |
| 12/02/2017*; 7:00 pm | | vs. Montana State; Maui Classic | W 67–53 | 4–4 | War Memorial Gym; Maui, HI |
| 12/09/2017*; 4:00 pm | | at Seattle | W 74–65 | 5–4 | Connolly Center (311); Seattle, WA |
| 12/12/2017*; 11:00 am | | Stanislaus State | W 81–60 | 6–4 | Lawlor Events Center (5,355); Reno, NV |
| 12/16/2017*; 2:00 pm | | Santa Clara | W 52–41 | 7–4 | Lawlor Events Center (1,457); Reno, NV |
Mountain West regular season
| 12/28/2017; 6:30 pm | | Fresno State | W 90–73 | 8–4 (1–0) | Lawlor Events Center (1,158); Reno, NV |
| 12/30/2017; 12:00 pm | | at New Mexico | L 68–72 | 8–5 (1–1) | Dreamstyle Arena (6,342); Albuquerque, NM |
| 01/03/2018; 5:30 pm | | at Wyoming | L 60–66 | 8–6 (1–2) | Arena-Auditorium (2,207); Laramie, WY |
| 01/06/2018; 2:00 pm | | Air Force | W 70–60 | 9–6 (2–2) | Lawlor Events Center (1,170); Reno, NV |
| 01/13/2018; 1:00 pm | | at Utah State | L 57–79 | 9–7 (2–3) | Smith Spectrum (235); Logan, UT |
| 01/17/2018; 6:30 pm | | San José State | W 91–63 | 10–7 (3–3) | Lawlor Events Center (1,026); Reno, NV |
| 01/20/2018; 2:00 pm | | at Boise State | W 72–68 | 11–7 (4–3) | Taco Bell Arena (1,157); Boise, ID |
| 01/24/2018; 6:30 pm | | Wyoming | L 62–65 | 11–8 (4–4) | Lawlor Events Center (1,109); Reno, NV |
| 01/31/2018; 7:00 pm | | at Fresno State | L 55–68 | 11–9 (4–5) | Save Mart Center (2,045); Fresno, CA |
| 02/03/2018; 2:00 pm | | Colorado State | L 59–65 | 11–10 (4–6) | Lawlor Events Center (1,467); Reno, NV |
| 02/07/2018; 6:00 pm | | at UNLV | L 75–77 | 11–11 (4–7) | Cox Pavilion (794); Paradise, NV |
| 02/10/2018; 7:00 pm | | at San Diego State | L 72–75 | 11–12 (4–8) | Viejas Arena (812); San Diego, CA |
| 02/14/2018; 6:30 pm | | Boise State | L 55–63 | 11–13 (4–9) | Lawlor Events Center (1,163); Reno, NV |
| 02/17/2018; 2:00 pm | | Utah State | W 85–78 ^{OT} | 12–13 (5–9) | Lawlor Events Center (2,132); Reno, NV |
| 02/21/2018; 7:00 pm | | at San José State | L 54–57 | 12–14 (5–10) | Event Center Arena (766); Laramie, WY |
| 02/24/2018; 1:00 pm | | at Colorado State | L 64–75 | 12–15 (5–11) | Moby Arena (1,157); Fort Collins, CO |
| 02/27/2018; 6:30 pm | | UNLV | W 75–55 | 13–15 (6–11) | Lawlor Events Center (1,670); Reno, NV |
| 03/02/2018; 6:30 pm | | San Diego State | W 84–72 | 14–15 (7–11) | Lawlor Events Center (2,122); Reno, NV |
Mountain West Women's Tournament
| 03/05/2018; 4:30 pm | (7) | vs. (10) San Diego State; First Round | W 95–84 ^{OT} | 15–15 | Thomas & Mack Center; Paradise, NV |
| 03/06/2018; 6:00 pm | (7) | vs. (2) UNLV; Quarterfinals | W 77–73 ^{2OT} | 16–15 | Thomas & Mack Center; Paradise, NV |
| 03/07/2018; 9:00 pm | (7) | vs. (3) Wyoming; Semifinals | W 67–63 | 17–15 | Thomas & Mack Center (3,298); Paradise, NV |
| 03/09/2018; 12:00 pm | (7) | vs. (1) Boise State; Championship Game | L 60–62 | 17–16 | Thomas & Mack Center (2,419); Paradise, NV |
WBI
| 03/15/2018*; 6:30 pm | | UC Irvine; First Round | W 70–60 | 18–16 | Lawlor Events Center (1,205); Reno, NV |
| 03/19/2018*; 7:00 pm | | at Fresno State; Quarterfinals | W 86–74 | 19–16 | Save Mart Center (662); Fresno, CA |
| 03/24/2018*; 3:00 pm | | at Central Arkansas; Semifinals | L 56–65 | 19–17 | Farris Center (1,457); Conway, AR |
*Non-conference game. ^{#}Rankings from AP Poll. (#) Tournament seedings in parentheses. All times are in Pacific Time.

== See also ==
- 2017–18 Nevada Wolf Pack men's basketball team
