= 2017–18 Boise State Broncos women's basketball team =

American college basketball season

2017–18 Boise State Broncos women's basketball

Mountain West Regular Season co-champions and Tournament Champions

NCAA Women's Tournament, first round
- Conference: Mountain West Conference
- Record: 23–10 (14–4 MWC)
- Head coach: Gordy Presnell (13th season)
- Assistant coaches: Cody Butler; Heather Sower; Cariann Ramirez
- Home arena: Taco Bell Arena

2017–18 Mountain West Conference women's basketball standings
	Conf.				Overall
Team	W		L	PCT	W		L	PCT
Boise State †	14	–	4	.778	23	–	10	.697
UNLV	14	–	4	.778	19	–	12	.613
Wyoming	13	–	5	.722	22	–	11	.667
Colorado State	11	–	7	.611	21	–	12	.636
Fresno State	11	–	7	.611	17	–	15	.531
New Mexico	10	–	8	.556	25	–	11	.694
Nevada	7	–	11	.389	19	–	17	.528
San Diego State	5	–	13	.278	11	–	19	.367
Utah State	5	–	13	.278	7	–	23	.233
Air Force	5	–	13	.278	6	–	25	.194
San Jose State	4	–	14	.222	7	–	23	.233
† 2018 MW Tournament winner Rankings from AP poll

The 2017–18 Boise State Broncos women's basketball team represented Boise State University during the 2017–18 NCAA Division I women's basketball season. The Broncos, led by 13th-year head coach Gordy Presnell, played their home games at Taco Bell Arena as a member of the Mountain West Conference. They finished the season 23–10, 14–4 in Mountain West play to win the Mountain West regular season title with UNLV. They were also champions of the Mountain West women's tournament and earn an automatic trip to the NCAA women's tournament, where they lost in the first round to Louisville.

== Roster ==
2017–18 Boise State Broncos women's basketball team
Players
Coaches

Pos.	#	Name	Height	Year	Previous school	Hometown
F	2	Shalem Shaw	6 ft 1 in (1.85 m)	Sr	Reno HS	Reno, NV
F	3	Sofia Galeron	6 ft 2 in (1.88 m)	Fr		Burgos, Spain
F	13	Hailey Vice-Neat	6 ft 3 in (1.91 m)	Fr	Cardinal Newman HS	Santa Rosa, CA
G	14	Braydey Hodgins	5 ft 8 in (1.73 m)	So	Chiawana HS	Pasco, WA
F	15	Tess Amundsen	6 ft 1 in (1.85 m)	Fr	Clovis West HS	Fresno, CA
G	20	Marta Hermida	5 ft 11 in (1.8 m)	Jr	Margarita Salas HS	Madrid, Spain
G	21	Riley Lupfer	5 ft 9 in (1.75 m)	So	Lewis and Clark HS	Spokane, WA
G/F	22	Ellie Woerner	6 ft 0 in (1.83 m)	RS So	Eastlake HS; Portland	Sammamish, WA
G	23	Jayde Christopher (redshirt)	5 ft 8 in (1.73 m)	Jr	Cleveland HS; Kansas	Federal Way, WA
F	24	Leonie Edringer	6 ft 1 in (1.85 m)	So	Max-Planck-Gymnasium	Trier, Germany
C	31	Marijke Vanderschaaf	6 ft 3 in (1.91 m)	RS Jr	Eastlake HS	Sammamish, WA
F	33	Joyce Harrell	6 ft 0 in (1.83 m)	Jr	Cleveland HS	Seattle, WA
G	40	Brittney Pahukoa	5 ft 7 in (1.7 m)	Sr	Lake Stevens HS	Lake Stevens, WA
F	42	A'Shanti Coleman	6 ft 2 in (1.88 m)	RS So	Sacred Heart Cathedral Prep; Arizona	San Francisco, CA
F	44	Emerald Toth	6 ft 1 in (1.85 m)	So	Bozeman HS	Bozeman, MT
C	54	Brooke Wheeler	6 ft 3 in (1.91 m)	Sr	Springville HS; Utah Valley; Snow College	Springville, UT

Head coach

- Gordy Presnell (Northwest Nazarene)

Assistant coach(es)

- Cody Butler (Nevada)
- Heather Sower (Boise State)
- Cariann Ramirez (Boise State)

Legend

- (C) Team captain
- (S) Suspended
- (I) Ineligible
- (W) Walk-on
- Injured
- Current redshirt

Roster

== Schedule ==
Date time, TV	Rank^{#}	Opponent^{#}	Result	Record	Site (attendance) city, state
Exhibition
11/05/2017*; 2:00 pm		Carroll (MT)	L 61–62		Taco Bell Arena; Boise, ID
Non-conference regular season
11/10/2017*; 5:30 pm		Northwest Christian	W 83–51	1–0	Taco Bell Arena (778); Boise, ID
11/17/2017*; 4:30 pm		vs. San Diego; Hawai'i Rainbow Wahine Classic	L 52–72	1–1	Stan Sheriff Center; Honolulu, HI
11/19/2017*; 2:30 pm		vs. Northern Arizona; Hawai'i Rainbow Wahine Classic	L 60–62	1–2	Stan Sheriff Center; Honolulu, HI
11/26/2017*; 2:00 pm		Corban	W 94–50	2–2	Taco Bell Arena (657); Boise, ID
11/30/2017*; 7:00 pm		Saint Mary's	L 72–74	2–3	Taco Bell Arena (476); Boise, ID
12/03/2016*; 7:00 pm		at Eastern Washington	W 61–57	3–3	Reese Court (552); Cheney, WA
12/07/2017*; 7:00 pm		Washington	W 85–62	4–3	Taco Bell Arena (806); Boise, ID
12/10/2017*; 3:00 pm		at Portland	W 73–47	5–3	Chiles Center (401); Portland, OR
12/18/2017*; 7:00 pm		Washington State	L 53–61	5–4	Taco Bell Arena (896); Boise, ID
12/20/2017*; 7:00 pm		Cal State Bakersfield	L 59–65	5–5	Taco Bell Arena (496); Boise, ID
12/21/2017*; 5:30 pm		Saint Francis (PA)	W 87–59	6–5	Taco Bell Arena (476); Boise, ID
Mountain West regular season
12/28/2017; 7:00 pm		at Colorado State	W 62–58	7–5 (1–0)	Moby Arena (1,209); Fort Collins, CO
12/30/2017; 1:00 pm		UNLV	W 69–60	8–5 (2–0)	Taco Bell Arena (890); Boise, ID
01/03/2018; 7:00 pm		at New Mexico	L 83–100	8–6 (2–1)	Dreamstyle Arena (5,367); Albuquerque, NM
01/06/2018; 2:00 pm		Wyoming	L 51–66	8–7 (2–2)	Taco Bell Arena (1,058); Boise, ID
01/10/2018; 7:00 pm		Fresno State	W 75–66	9–7 (3–2)	Taco Bell Arena (568); Boise, ID
01/13/2018; 2:00 pm		at San Diego State	W 86–70	10–7 (4–2)	Viejas Arena (674); San Diego, CA
01/17/2018; 7:00 pm		at Utah State	W 64–42	11–7 (5–2)	Smith Spectrum (563); Logan, UT
01/20/2018; 2:00 pm		Nevada	L 68–72	11–8 (5–3)	Taco Bell Arena (1,157); Boise, ID
01/24/2018; 2:00 pm		at San José State	W 112–80	12–8 (6–3)	Event Center Arena (889); San Jose, CA
01/27/2018; 2:00 pm		Air Force	W 49–46	13–8 (7–3)	Taco Bell Arena (1,045); Boise, ID
02/03/2018; 4:00 pm		at UNLV	L 54–77	13–9 (7–4)	Thomas & Mack Center (1,503); Paradise, NV
02/07/2018; 7:00 pm		New Mexico	W 91–85	14–9 (8–4)	Taco Bell Arena (610); Boise, ID
02/10/2018; 2:00 pm		Utah State	W 68–60	15–9 (9–4)	Taco Bell Arena (1,257); Boise, ID
02/14/2018; 7:30 pm		at Nevada	W 63–55	16–9 (10–4)	Lawlor Events Center (1,163); Reno, NV
02/17/2018; 1:00 pm		at Air Force	W 58–47	17–9 (11–4)	Clune Arena (627); Colorado Springs, CO
02/21/2018; 7:00 pm		Colorado State	W 55–49	18–9 (12–4)	Taco Bell Arena (641); Boise, ID
02/27/2018; 7:00 pm		San Diego State	W 64–53	19–9 (13–4)	Taco Bell Arena (809); Boise, ID
03/02/2018; 6:30 pm		at Wyoming	W 67–63	20–9 (14–4)	Arena-Auditorium (6,312); Laramie, WY
Mountain West Women's Tournament
03/06/2018; 1:00 pm	(1)	vs. (8) Air Force; Quarterfinals	W 60–46	21–9	Thomas & Mack Center; Paradise, NV
03/07/2018; 7:30 pm	(1)	vs. (5) Colorado State; Semifinals	W 76–51	22–9	Thomas & Mack Center; Paradise, NV
03/09/2018; 1:00 pm	(1)	vs. (7) Nevada; Championship Game	W 62–60	23–9	Thomas & Mack Center (2,419); Paradise, NV
NCAA Women's Tournament
03/16/2018*; 10:00 am, ESPN2	(16 L)	at (1 L) No. 3 Louisville; First Round	L 42–74	23–10	KFC Yum! Center; Louisville, KY
*Non-conference game. ^{#}Rankings from AP Poll. (#) Tournament seedings in parentheses. L=Lexington Region. All times are in Mountain Time.

== Rankings ==
2017–18 NCAA Division I women's basketball rankings

Regular season polls
Poll	Pre- Season	Week 2	Week 3	Week 4	Week 5	Week 6	Week 7	Week 8	Week 9	Week 10	Week 11	Week 12	Week 13	Week 14	Week 15	Week 16	Week 17	Week 18	Week 19	Final
AP																				N/A
Coaches	RV	N/A																		

Legend
	Increase in ranking
	Decrease in ranking
	Not ranked previous week
(RV)	Received Votes
(NR)	Not Ranked

== See also ==
2017–18 Boise State Broncos men's basketball team
