= 2017–18 UNLV Lady Rebels basketball team =

Intercollegiate basketball season

2017–18 UNLV Lady Rebels basketball

Mountain West Regular Season Co-Champions

WNIT, First Round
- Conference: Mountain West Conference
- Record: 19–12 (14–4 Mountain West)
- Head coach: Kathy Olivier (10th season)
- Assistant coaches: Caitlin Collier; Mia Bell; Peggy Smith
- Home arena: Cox Pavilion; Thomas & Mack Center

2017–18 Mountain West Conference women's basketball standings
	Conf.				Overall
Team	W		L	PCT	W		L	PCT
Boise State †	14	–	4	.778	23	–	10	.697
UNLV	14	–	4	.778	19	–	12	.613
Wyoming	13	–	5	.722	22	–	11	.667
Colorado State	11	–	7	.611	21	–	12	.636
Fresno State	11	–	7	.611	17	–	15	.531
New Mexico	10	–	8	.556	25	–	11	.694
Nevada	7	–	11	.389	19	–	17	.528
San Diego State	5	–	13	.278	11	–	19	.367
Utah State	5	–	13	.278	7	–	23	.233
Air Force	5	–	13	.278	6	–	25	.194
San Jose State	4	–	14	.222	7	–	23	.233
† 2018 MW Tournament winner Rankings from AP poll

The 2017–18 UNLV Lady Rebels basketball team represented the University of Nevada, Las Vegas during the 2017–18 NCAA Division I women's basketball season. The Lady Rebels, led by tenth year head coach Kathy Olivier, played their home games at the Cox Pavilion, attached to the Thomas & Mack Center on UNLV's main campus in Paradise, Nevada. They were a member of the Mountain West Conference. They finished the season 19–12, 14–4 in Mountain West play to win the Mountain West regular season title with Boise State. They lost in the quarterfinals Mountain West women's tournament to Nevada. They earned an automatic bid to the WNIT, where they lost in the first round to Utah.

== Roster ==
2017–18 UNLV Lady Rebels women's basketball team
Players
Coaches

Pos.	#	Name	Height	Year	Previous school	Hometown
G	0	Kennedy Wharton	5 ft 7 in (1.7 m)	Sr	Valley HS; Grays Harbor College	Las Vegas, NV
G	1	Kavionnia Brown	5 ft 3 in (1.6 m)	Fr	Cibola HS	Albuquerque, NM
G	2	Brooke Johnson	5 ft 11 in (1.8 m)	Sr	Hanford HS	Hanford, CA
F	3	Paris Strawther	6 ft 2 in (1.88 m)	Jr	Liberty HS	Las Vegas, NV
F	5	Simone Sheppard	6 ft 0 in (1.83 m)	Sr	Sacramento HS	Sacramento, CA
F	10	Nikki Wheatley (redshirt)	5 ft 5 in (1.65 m)	RS Jr	Bonita HS	La Verne, CA
G	14	Bailey Thomas (redshirt)	5 ft 9 in (1.75 m)	RS So	Marian HS; West Virginia	Las Vegas, NV
G	15	LaTecia Smith (redshirt)	5 ft 6 in (1.68 m)	RS Jr	Narbonne HS; Seton Hall	Gardenia, CA
F	20	Alyssa Anderson	6 ft 0 in (1.83 m)	RS Jr	Etiwanda HS	Ranch Cucamonga, CA
C	21	Katie Powell	6 ft 4 in (1.93 m)	RS Jr	Duluth HS; Arkansas	Duluth, GA
F/C	22	Destiney Lee	6 ft 2 in (1.88 m)	Jr	C. K. McClatchy HS	Sacramento, CA
F	23	Jordyn Bell	6 ft 1 in (1.85 m)	Jr	Bradshaw Christian HS	Elk Grove, CA
C	24	Rodjanae Wade	6 ft 2 in (1.88 m)	So	Edison HS	Fresno, CA
C	25	Krista Jackman	6 ft 5 in (1.96 m)	Fr	River Valley HS	Mohave Valley, AZ

Head coach

- Kathy Olivier (UNLV)

Assistant coach(es)

- Caitlin Collier (UC Davis)
- Mia Bell (UNLV)
- Peggy Smith (Appalachian State)

Legend

- (C) Team captain
- (S) Suspended
- (I) Ineligible
- (W) Walk-on
- Injured
- Current redshirt

Roster

== Schedule ==
Date time, TV	Rank^{#}	Opponent^{#}	Result	Record	Site (attendance) city, state
Non-conference regular season
11/10/2017*; 6:00 pm		Portland State	W 88–80 ^{OT}	1–0	Cox Pavilion (383); Paradise, NV
11/14/2017*; 12:00 pm		UC Irvine	W 73–54	2–0	Cox Pavilion; Paradise, NV
11/19/2017*; 4:00 pm		Grand Canyon	W 76–47	3–0	Cox Pavilion (868); Paradise, NV
11/25/2017*; 12:00 pm		Hofstra; Lady Rebel Round-Up semifinals	W 68–52	4–0	Cox Pavilion; Paradise, NV
11/26/2017*; 2:30 pm		Minnesota; Lady Rebel Round-Up championship	L 72–79	4–1	Cox Pavilion (575); Paradise, NV
12/02/2017*; 11:35 am		vs. UC Riverside; ASU Classic semifinals	L 88–95	4–2	Wells Fargo Arena; Tempe, AZ
12/03/2017*; 11:30 am		vs. Buffalo; ASU Classic 3rd place game	L 53–80	4–3	Wells Fargo Arena; Tempe, AZ
12/09/2017*; 2:00 pm		at Gonzaga	W 52–50	5–3	McCarthey Athletic Center (5,378); Spokane, WA
12/16/2017*; 2:00 pm		at No. 18 Stanford	L 33–74	5–4	Maples Pavilion (2,763); Stanford, CA
12/20/2016*; 2:30 pm		No. 5 Mississippi State; Duel in the Desert Rebel Division	L 63–103	5–5	Cox Pavilion; Paradise, NV
12/22/2017*; 2:30 pm		Syracuse; Duel in the Desert Rebel Division	L 55–69	5–6	Cox Pavilion; Paradise, NV
Mountain West regular season
12/30/2017; 12:00 pm		at Boise State	L 60–69	5–7 (0–1)	Taco Bell Arena (890); Boise, ID
01/03/2018; 6:00 pm		San José State	W 79–60	6–7 (1–1)	Cox Pavilion (2,055); Paradise, NV
01/06/2018; 1:00 pm		at Utah State	W 63–54	7–7 (2–1)	Smith Spectrum (346); Logan, UT
01/10/2018; 6:00 pm		Air Force	W 69–58	8–7 (3–1)	Cox Pavilion (508); Paradise, NV
01/17/2018; 6:00 pm		at New Mexico	W 68–66	9–7 (4–1)	Dreamstyle Arena (5,786); Albuquerque, NM
01/20/2018; 3:00 pm		Colorado State	W 56–52	10–7 (5–1)	Cox Pavilion (1,358); Paradise, NV
01/24/2018; 6:00 pm		Fresno State	L 72–74	10–8 (5–2)	Cox Pavilion (528); Paradise, NV
01/27/2018; 1:00 pm		at San Diego State	W 75–64	11–8 (6–2)	Viejas Arena (4,568); San Diego, CA
01/31/2018; 7:00 pm		San José State	W 80–57	12–8 (7–2)	Event Center Arena (767); San Jose, CA
02/03/2018; 3:00 pm		Boise State	W 77–54	13–8 (8–2)	Thomas & Mack Center (1,503); Paradise, NV
02/07/2018; 6:00 pm		Nevada	W 77–75	14–8 (9–2)	Cox Pavilion (794); Paradise, NV
02/10/2018; 1:00 pm		at Wyoming	L 56–69	14–9 (9–3)	Arena-Auditorium (3,223); Laramie, WY
02/14/2018; 6:00 pm		at Air Force	W 67–59	15–9 (10–3)	Clune Arena (263); Colorado Springs, CO
02/17/2018; 3:00 pm		San Diego State	W 73–67 ^{OT}	16–9 (11–3)	Cox Pavilion (783); Paradise, NV
02/21/2018; 7:00 pm		at Fresno State	W 73–58	17–9 (12–3)	Save Mart Center (2,204); Fresno, CA
02/24/2018; 3:00 pm		New Mexico	W 74–62	18–9 (13–3)	Cox Pavilion (1,065); Paradise, NV
02/27/2018; 6:30 pm		at Nevada	L 55–75	18–10 (13–4)	Lawlor Events Center (1,670); Reno, NV
03/02/2018; 6:00 pm		Utah State	W 68–58	19–10 (14–4)	Cox Pavilion (1,001); Paradise, NV
Mountain West Women's Tournament
03/06/2018; 6:00 pm	(2)	(7) Nevada; Quarterfinals	L 73–77 ^{2OT}	19–11	Thomas & Mack Center; Paradise, NV
WNIT
03/15/2018*; 6:00 pm		at Utah; First Round	L 68–78	19–12	Jon M. Huntsman Center (497); Salt Lake City, UT
*Non-conference game. ^{#}Rankings from AP Poll. (#) Tournament seedings in parentheses. All times are in Pacific Time.

== See also ==
2017–18 UNLV Runnin' Rebels basketball team
