= 2018 Mountain West Conference women's basketball tournament =

- Classification: Division I
- Season: 2017–18
- Teams: 11
- Site: Thomas & Mack Center; Paradise, NV
- Champions: Boise State (3rd title)
- Winning coach: Gordy Presnell (3rd title)
- MVP: Riley Lupfer (Boise State)
- Television: MW Net, Stadium

2017–18 Mountain West Conference women's basketball standings
	Conf.				Overall
Team	W		L	PCT	W		L	PCT
Boise State †	14	–	4	.778	23	–	10	.697
UNLV	14	–	4	.778	19	–	12	.613
Wyoming	13	–	5	.722	22	–	11	.667
Colorado State	11	–	7	.611	21	–	12	.636
Fresno State	11	–	7	.611	17	–	15	.531
New Mexico	10	–	8	.556	25	–	11	.694
Nevada	7	–	11	.389	19	–	17	.528
San Diego State	5	–	13	.278	11	–	19	.367
Utah State	5	–	13	.278	7	–	23	.233
Air Force	5	–	13	.278	6	–	25	.194
San Jose State	4	–	14	.222	7	–	23	.233
† 2018 MW Tournament winner Rankings from AP poll

The 2018 Mountain West Conference women's basketball tournament was held from March 5–9, 2018 at the Thomas & Mack Center on the campus of University of Nevada, Las Vegas, in Las Vegas, Nevada. The winner of the tournament received an automatic bid to the 2018 NCAA tournament. The 2017 tournament, saw Boise State defeat Fresno State 66–53 to receive an automatic bid to the 2017 NCAA tournament.

== Seeds ==
Teams are seeded by conference record, with a ties broken by record between the tied teams followed by record against the regular-season champion, if necessary.

Seed	School	Conf	Tiebreaker
#1	Boise State	14–4	
#2	UNLV	14–4	
#3	Wyoming	13–5	
#4	Fresno State	11–7	
#5	Colorado State	11–7	
#6	New Mexico	10–8	
#7	Nevada	7–11	
#8	Air Force	5–13	
#9	Utah State	5–13	
#10	San Diego State	5–13	
#11	San Jose State	4–14	

== Schedule ==
Game	Time*	Matchup^{#}	Television	TV Announcers	MW Radio Announcers
First round – Monday, March 5
1	2:00 pm	#8 Air Force vs. #9 Utah State	MWN	Krista Blunk & Tammy Blackburn	Nate Kreckman & Robert Smith
2	4:30 pm	#7 Nevada vs. #10 San Diego St.	MWN	Krista Blunk & Tammy Blackburn	Chris Lewis & Robert Smith
3	7:00 pm	#6 New Mexico vs. #11 San Jose St.	MWN	Krista Blunk & Tammy Blackburn	Nate Kreckman & Marty Fletcher
Quarterfinals – Tuesday, March 6
4	Noon	#1 Boise State vs. #8 Air Force	MWN	Krista Blunk & Tammy Blackburn	Nate Kreckman & Marty Fletcher
5	2:30 pm	#4 Fresno State vs. #5 CSU	MWN	Krista Blunk & Tammy Blackburn	Chad Andrus & Marty Fletcher
6	6:00 pm	#2 UNLV vs. #7 Nevada	MWN	Krista Blunk & Tammy Blackburn	Chad Andrus & Robert Smith
7	8:30 pm	#3 Wyoming vs. #6 New Mexico	MWN	Krista Blunk & Tammy Blackburn	Nate Kreckman & Robert Smith
Semifinals – Wednesday, March 7
8	6:30 pm	#1 Bosie St. vs. #5 Colorado St.	MWN	Krista Blunk & Tammy Blackburn	Nate Kreckman & Robert Smith
9	9:00 pm	#7 Nevada vs. #3 Wyoming	MWN	Krista Blunk & Tammy Blackburn	Chad Andrus & Robert Smith
Championship – Friday, March 9
10	Noon	#1 Boise St. vs. #7 Nevada	Stadium	Krista Blunk & Tammy Blackburn	Chad Andrus & Robert Smith
*Game Times in PT. #-Rankings denote tournament seeding.

== Bracket ==
First round Monday, March 5
8	Air Force	68
9	Utah St.	54
7	Nevada	95
10	San Diego St.	84
6	New Mexico	84
11	San Jose St.	54

Quarterfinals; Tuesday, March 6
1	Boise St.	60
8	Air Force	46
4	Fresno St.	55
5	Colorado State	71
2	UNLV	73
7	Nevada	77
3	Wyoming	69
6	New Mexico	66

Semifinals; Wednesday, March 7
1	Boise State	76
5	Colorado State	51
7	Nevada	67
3	Wyoming	63

Championship; Friday, March 9
1	Boise State	62
7	Nevada	60

== See also ==
- 2018 Mountain West Conference men's basketball tournament
