= 2018 Women's National Invitation Tournament =

College basketball postseason tournament

- Season: 2017–18
- Teams: 64
- Finals site: Simon Skjodt Assembly Hall, Bloomington, Indiana
- Champions: Indiana Hoosiers (1st title)
- Runner-up: Virginia Tech Hokies (1st title game)
- Semifinalists: TCU Horned Frogs (1st semifinal); West Virginia Mountaineers (2nd semifinal)
- Winning coach: Teri Moren (1st title)
- MVP: Tyra Buss (Indiana)
- Attendance: 13,007 (championship game)

The 2018 Women's National Invitation Tournament was an annual single-elimination tournament of 64 NCAA Division I teams that were not selected to participate in the 2018 Women's NCAA tournament. The tournament committee announced the 64-team field on March 12, following the selection of the NCAA Tournament field. The tournament began on March 14 and ended on March 31, with the championship game televised on the CBS Sports Network. In the championship game, Indiana defeated Virginia Tech, 65–57.

== Participants ==
The 2018 Postseason WNIT field consisted of 32 automatic invitations – one from each conference – and 32 at-large teams. The intention of the WNIT Selection Committee was to select the best available at-large teams in the nation. Teams with the highest finishes in their conferences’ regular-season standings that were not selected for the NCAA Tournament were offered an automatic berth. The remaining berths in the WNIT were filled by the best teams available. Teams considered for an at-large berth had overall records of .500 or better.

=== Automatic qualifiers ===
Conference	School
America East	Albany
American	UCF
Atlantic 10	Duquesne
Atlantic Sun	Jacksonville
ACC	Virginia Tech
Big 12	TCU
Big East	St John's
Big Sky	Idaho
Big South	Radford
Big Ten	Indiana
Big West	UC Davis
Colonial	Drexel
C-USA	UAB
Horizon League	IUPUI
Ivy League	Penn
MAAC	Marist
MAC	Ball State
MEAC	Bethune Cookman
Missouri Valley	Missouri State
Mountain West	UNLV
Northeast	Robert Morris
Ohio Valley	UT Martin
Patriot	Bucknell
SEC	Alabama
Southern	East Tennessee State
Southland	Lamar
SWAC	Southern
Summit League	South Dakota
Sun Belt	Texas State
WCC	Saint Mary's
WAC	New Mexico State

=== At-large bids ===
Conference	School
American	Cincinnati
American	Houston
Atlantic 10	Fordham
Atlantic 10	George Mason
Atlantic 10	Saint Joseph's
Atlantic 10	Saint Louis
ACC	Georgia Tech
Big 12	Kansas State
Big 12	West Virginia
Big East	Georgetown
Big East	Seton Hall
Big Ten	Michigan State
Big Ten	Penn State
Big Ten	Purdue
Colonial	Delaware
Colonial	James Madison
CUSA	Louisiana Tech
CUSA	Middle Tennessee State
CUSA	Rice
Horizon League	Milwaukee
Horizon League	Wright State
Ivy League	Harvard
MAC	Miami (OH)
MAC	Toledo
Missouri Valley	Northern Iowa
Mountain West	Colorado State
Mountain West	New Mexico
Mountain West	Wyoming
Pac-12	Utah
Patriot	Navy
Southern	Chattanooga
Southland	Stephen F. Austin
Summit League	Western Illinois

== Bracket ==
All times are listed as Eastern Daylight Time (UTC−4)
* – Denotes overtime period

Round 1 March 14–16
Houston	58
South Dakota	65
Western Illinois	64
Colorado State	67
Cincinnati	75
Michigan State	81
Wright State	50
Toledo	64
Saint Mary's	80
New Mexico	82
Texas State	60
Rice	71
Lamar	68
TCU	80
Missouri State	63
Louisiana Tech	59

Round 2 March 17–20
South Dakota	74
Colorado State	49
Michigan State	68
Toledo	66
New Mexico	93
Rice	73
TCU	86
Missouri State	51

Round 3 March 22
South Dakota	85*
Michigan State	83
New Mexico	72
TCU	81

Quarterfinals; March 25
South Dakota	71
TCU	79

Round 1 March 14–16
Purdue	48
IUPUI	46
Middle Tennessee	60
Ball State	69
UT Martin	50
Indiana	74
Milwaukee	81
Northern Iowa	67
New Mexico State	59
Wyoming	67
Idaho	62
UC Davis	82
Saint Louis	61
Kansas State	75
UNLV	68
Utah	78

Round 2 March 18
Purdue	77
Ball State	72
Indiana	74
Milwaukee	54
Wyoming	64
UC Davis	74
Kansas State	74
Utah	57

Round 3 March 22–23
Purdue	51
Indiana	73
UC Davis	71
Kansas State	69

Quarterfinals; March 25
Indiana	81
UC Davis	66

Round 1 March 14–16
Bucknell	50
West Virginia	83
St. Joseph's	75
Seton Hall	57
Radford	63*
Penn State	62
ETSU	52
James Madison	60
Albany	61
Penn	76
Marist	47
St. John's	68
Duquesne	69
Miami (OH)	56
Delaware	57
Georgetown	67

Round 2 March 17–20
West Virginia	79
St. Joseph's	51
Radford	35
James Madison	62
Penn	48
St. John's	53
Duquesne	69
Georgetown	66

Round 3 March 22–23
West Virginia	67
James Madison	55
St. John's	65
Duquesne	52

Quarterfinals; March 25
West Virginia	76
St. John's	62

Round 1 March 14–16
Harvard	47
Fordham	65
Robert Morris	44
Drexel	57
Stephen F. Austin	75
George Mason	82
Navy	55
Virginia Tech	56
Bethune-Cookman	32
Georgia Tech	85
Chattanooga	50
UAB	60
Jacksonville	60*
UCF	65
Southern	56
Alabama	69

Round 2 March 18
Fordham	63
Drexel	60
George Mason	69
Virginia Tech	78
Georgia Tech	91
UAB	47
UCF	61
Alabama	80

Round 3 March 22
Fordham	50
Virginia Tech	81
Georgia Tech	59
Alabama	61

Quarterfinals; March 25
Virginia Tech	74
Alabama	67

=== Semifinals and Championship Game ===
Semifinals; March 28
TCU	58
Indiana	71
West Virginia	61
Virginia Tech	64

Championship Game; March 31, 3:00 p.m. CBS Sports Network
Indiana	65
Virginia Tech	57

==== Semifinals ====
Wed., March 28
7:00 p.m.

Report

TCU Horned Frogs 58, Indiana Hoosiers 71
Scoring by quarter: 14–13, 14–19, 12–19, 18–20

Simon Skjodt Assembly Hall
Bloomington, IN

Wed., March 28
7:00 p.m.

Report

Virginia Tech Hokies 64, West Virginia Mountaineers 61
Scoring by quarter: 19–12, 14–13, 15–20, 16–16

WVU Coliseum
Morgantown, WV

==== Championship ====
CBSSN

Sat., March 31
3:00 p.m.

Report

Virginia Tech Hokies 57, Indiana Hoosiers 65
Scoring by quarter: 13–17, 14–19, 17–7, 13–22

Simon Skjodt Assembly Hall
Bloomington, IN
Attendance: 13,007

== All-tournament team ==
- Tyra Buss (Indiana), MVP
- Amanda Cahill (Indiana)
- Taylor Emery (Virginia Tech)
- Regan Magarity (Virginia Tech)
- Teana Muldrow (West Virginia)
- Jordan Moore (TCU)

== See also ==
- 2018 National Invitation Tournament
