= 2017–18 North Carolina A&T Aggies women's basketball team =

Intercollegiate basketball season

2017–18 North Carolina A&T Aggies women's basketball

MEAC regular season co-champions MEAC tournament champions

NCAA tournament, First round
- Conference: Mid-Eastern Athletic Conference
- Record: 23–9 (15–1 MEAC)
- Head coach: Tarrell Robinson (6th season)
- Assistant coaches: Franklin Scott; Jaleesa Sams; Shavon Earp
- Home arena: Corbett Sports Center

2017–18 MEAC women's basketball standings
	Conf.				Overall
Team	W		L	PCT	W		L	PCT
Bethune–Cookman	15	–	1	.938	24	–	7	.774
North Carolina A&T †	15	–	1	.938	23	–	9	.719
Hampton	12	–	4	.750	18	–	14	.563
Norfolk State	11	–	5	.688	18	–	11	.621
Morgan State	8	–	8	.500	16	–	15	.516
Howard	8	–	8	.500	12	–	18	.400
Maryland-Eastern Shore	7	–	9	.438	11	–	19	.367
North Carolina Central	7	–	9	.438	9	–	21	.300
South Carolina State	6	–	10	.375	12	–	18	.400
Coppin State	5	–	11	.313	6	–	23	.207
Delaware State	5	–	11	.313	6	–	24	.200
Florida A&M	4	–	12	.250	8	–	24	.250
Savannah State	1	–	15	.063	5	–	25	.167
† 2018 MEAC tournament winner As of 16 March 2018; Rankings from AP poll

The 2017–18 North Carolina A&T Aggies women's basketball team represented North Carolina Agricultural and Technical State University during the 2017–18 NCAA Division I women's basketball season. The Aggies, led by sixth-year head coach Tarrell Robinson, played their home games at the Corbett Sports Center in Greensboro, North Carolina as members of the Mid-Eastern Athletic Conference (MEAC). They finished the season 23–9, 15–1 in MEAC play, winning the MEAC regular season title with Bethune–Cookman. They won the MEAC women's tournament and earned an automatic place in the NCAA women's tournament where they lost to South Carolina in the first round.

== Roster ==
2017–18 North Carolina A&T Aggies women's basketball team
Players
Coaches

Pos.	#	Name	Height	Year	Previous school	Hometown
G	1	Morgan Batie	5 ft 7 in (1.7 m)	Fr	Richmond Christian School	Richmond, VA
G	2	Shantell Bostick	5 ft 7 in (1.7 m)	So	New Tech East	Cleveland, OH
G	3	Cinia McCray	5 ft 9 in (1.75 m)	So	Proviso East	Broadview, IL
G	5	Mikaya Wilson	5 ft 6 in (1.68 m)	So	Knightdale	Raleigh, NC
F/C	10	Charnise Tyler	6 ft 2 in (1.88 m)	Jr	Suitland	District Heights, MD
F	11	Jade Scaife	5 ft 11 in (1.8 m)	RS Sr	Archbishop Spalding; UNC Greensboro	Fort Washington, MD
G	12	Ccoriea Foy	6 ft 0 in (1.83 m)	RS So	Jack Britt; Alabama	Fayetteville, NC
C	15	Alexus Lessears	6 ft 3 in (1.91 m)	So	Shaw	Cleveland, OH
G	21	Kala Green	5 ft 9 in (1.75 m)	Sr	Round Rock	Round Rock, TX
F	22	Le'on Hill	6 ft 2 in (1.88 m)	So	Keenen	Columbia, SC
G	25	Chrishyanah Alston	5 ft 9 in (1.75 m)	So	Sanford	New Castle, DE
F	30	Quenswayla Story	6 ft 1 in (1.85 m)	Sr	Lloyd C. Bird	Richmond, VA

Head coach

- Tarrell Robinson (North Carolina A&T)

Assistant coach(es)

- Franklin Scott (Tennessee)
- Jaleesa Sams (North Carolina A&T)
- Shavon Earp (Radford)

Legend

- (C) Team captain
- (S) Suspended
- (I) Ineligible
- (W) Walk-on
- Injured
- Current redshirt

Roster
Last update: June 29, 2024

== Schedule and results ==
Date time, TV	Rank^{#}	Opponent^{#}	Result	Record	Site (attendance) city, state
Non-conference regular season
11/10/2017*; 5:30 p.m.		Georgia Southern	W 60–49	1–0	Corbett Sports Center (1,411); Greensboro, NC
11/13/2017*; 5:30 p.m.		Elon	L 59–90	1–1	Corbett Sports Center (421); Greensboro, NC
11/16/2017*; 7:00 p.m.		at Auburn	L 53–63	1–2	Auburn Arena (1,489); Auburn, AL
11/21/2017*; 5:30 p.m.		Appalachian State	W 81–56	2–2	Corbett Sports Center (550); Greensboro, NC
11/25/2017*; 4:30 p.m.		vs. Duquesne; Cavalier Classic Tournament	L 60–73	2–3	John Paul Jones Arena (2,883); Charlottesville, VA
11/26/2017*; 1:00 p.m.		vs. Harvard; Cavalier Classic Tournament	L 60–64	2–4	John Paul Jones Arena (107); Charlottesville, VA
11/30/2017*; 7:00 p.m.		at UT Martin	L 63–76	2–5	Skyhawk Arena (1,243); Martin, TN
12/11/2017*; 5:30 p.m.		St. Augustine's	W 94–42	3–5	Corbett Sports Center (420); Greensboro, NC
12/14/2017*; 5:30 p.m.		Georgia	L 63–73	3–6	Corbett Sports Center (450); Greensboro, NC
12/19/2017*; 12:00 p.m.		Western Carolina	W 68–59	4–6	Corbett Sports Center (1,159); Greensboro, NC
12/28/2017*; 7:00 p.m.		at Ohio	L 65–72	4–7	Convocation Center (334); Athens, OH
01/02/2018*; 5:30 p.m.		St. Andrews	W 90–40	5–7	Corbett Sports Center (325); Greensboro, NC
MEAC regular season
01/08/2018; 5:30 p.m.		at Delaware State	W 66–48	6–7 (1–0)	Memorial Hall (226); Dover, DE
01/13/2018; 2:00 p.m.		Morgan State	W 67–60	7–7 (2–0)	Corbett Sports Center (757); Greensboro, NC
01/15/2018; 5:30 p.m.		Coppin State	W 64–63	8–7 (3–0)	Corbett Sports Center (1,071); Greensboro, NC
01/20/2018; 2:00 p.m.		at Maryland Eastern Shore	W 57–45	9–7 (4–0)	Hytche Athletic Center (717); Princess Anne, MD
01/22/2018; 6:00 p.m.		at Howard	W 76–68	10–7 (5–0)	Burr Gymnasium (1,804); Washington, D.C.
01/27/2018; 2:00 p.m.		North Carolina Central	W 67–54	11–7 (6–0)	Corbett Sports Center (5,700); Greensboro, NC
01/31/2018; 5:30 p.m.		Norfolk State	W 53–51	12–7 (7–0)	Corbett Sports Center (517); Greensboro, NC
02/03/2018; 2:00 p.m.		Hampton	L 51–63	12–8 (7–1)	Corbett Sports Center (650); Greensboro, NC
02/05/2018; 5:30 p.m.		Delaware State	W 75–55	13–8 (8–1)	Corbett Sports Center (607); Greensboro, NC
02/10/2018; 2:00 p.m.		at South Carolina State	W 74–54	14–8 (9–1)	SHM Memorial Center (279); Orangeburg, SC
02/12/2018; 6:00 p.m.		at Savannah State	W 69–44	15–8 (10–1)	Tiger Arena (1,088); Savannah, GA
02/17/2018; 2:00 p.m.		Howard	W 91–53	16–8 (11–1)	Corbett Sports Center (1,053); Greensboro, NC
02/19/2018; 5:30 p.m.		Maryland Eastern Shore	W 65–60	17–8 (12–1)	Corbett Sports Center (1,500); Greensboro, NC
02/24/2018; 4:00 p.m.		at Florida A&M	W 73–52	18–8 (13–1)	Teaching Gym (849); Tallahassee, FL
02/26/2018; 5:30 p.m.		at Bethune–Cookman	W 62–55	19–8 (14–1)	Moore Gymnasium (901); Daytona Beach, FL
03/03/2018; 5:30 p.m.		at North Carolina Central	W 60–57	20–8 (15–1)	McLendon–McDougald Gymnasium (2,612); Durham, NC
MEAC women's tournament
03/07/2018; 12:00 p.m., ESPN3	(1)	vs. (9) South Carolina State; Quarterfinals	W 54–38	21–8	Norfolk Scope; Norfolk, VA
03/09/2018; 12:00 p.m., ESPN3	(1)	vs. (12) Florida A&M; Semifinals	W 65–61	22–8	Norfolk Scope; Norfolk, VA
03/10/2018; 3:30 p.m., ESPN3	(1)	vs. (3) Hampton; Championship game	W 72–65 ^{OT}	23–8	Norfolk Scope; Norfolk, VA
NCAA women's tournament
03/16/2018*; 7:30 p.m., ESPN2	(15 A)	at (2 A) No. 7 South Carolina; First round	L 52–63	23–9	Colonial Life Arena (11,085); Columbia, SC
*Non-conference game. ^{#}Rankings from AP poll. (#) Tournament seedings in parentheses. A=Albany Region. All times are in Eastern.

== See also ==
- 2017–18 North Carolina A&T Aggies men's basketball team
