= 2017–18 Pepperdine Waves women's basketball team =

Intercollegiate basketball season

2017–18 Pepperdine Waves women's basketball
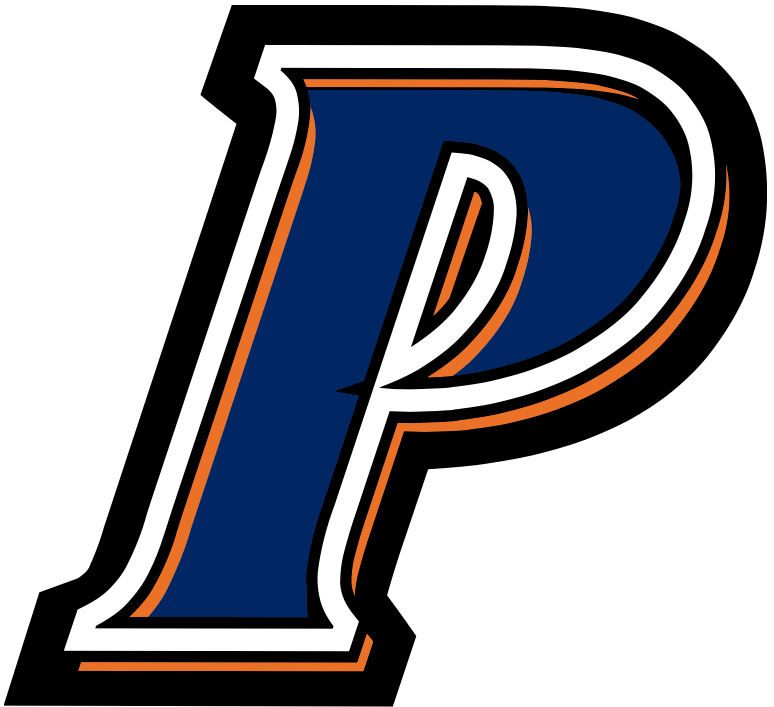
- Conference: West Coast Conference
- Record: 10–20 (5–13 WCC)
- Head coach: DeLisha Milton-Jones (1st season)
- Assistant coaches: Josh Pace; BJ Porter; Roland Jones Jr.
- Home arena: Firestone Fieldhouse

2017–18 West Coast Conference women's basketball standings
	Conf.				Overall
Team	W		L	PCT	W		L	PCT
Gonzaga †	17	–	1	.944	27	–	6	.818
Saint Mary's	13	–	5	.722	20	–	11	.645
Loyola Marymount	11	–	7	.611	19	–	11	.633
BYU	11	–	7	.611	16	–	14	.533
San Francisco	10	–	8	.556	16	–	15	.516
San Diego	8	–	10	.444	17	–	15	.531
Pacific	7	–	11	.389	15	–	17	.469
Pepperdine	5	–	13	.278	10	–	21	.323
Santa Clara	5	–	13	.278	9	–	21	.300
Portland	3	–	15	.167	7	–	23	.233
† 2018 WCC tournament winner As of 17 March 2018; Rankings from AP poll

The 2017–18 Pepperdine Waves women's basketball team represented Pepperdine University in the 2017–18 NCAA Division I women's basketball season. The Waves, as members of the West Coast Conference, were led by first year head coach DeLisha Milton-Jones. The Waves played their home games at the Firestone Fieldhouse on the university campus in Malibu, California. They finished the season 10–20, 5–13 in WCC play to finish in a tie for eighth place. They advanced to the quarterfinals of the WCC women's tournament, where they lost to Gonzaga.

== Previous season ==
They finished the season 7–23, 5–13 in WCC play to finish in a tie for eighth place. They lost in the first round of the WCC women's tournament to Pacific.

== Roster ==
2017–18 Pepperdine Waves women's basketball team
Players
Coaches

Pos.	#	Name	Height	Year	Previous school	Hometown
F	0	Peyton Langston	6 ft 0 in (1.83 m)	Sr	Mater Dei; Evansville	Carson, CA
G	2	Rose Pflug	5 ft 11 in (1.8 m)	Fr	Sunset	Portland, OR
G	3	Kim Jacobs	5 ft 10 in (1.78 m)	Sr	Agoura	Agoura Hills, CA
C	5	Megan House	6 ft 4 in (1.93 m)	RS So	Serra	Oceanside, CA
G	10	Paige Fescke	5 ft 4 in (1.63 m)	Jr	Chaminade	Studio City, CA
F	11	Monique Andriuolo	6 ft 1 in (1.85 m)	Fr	Maribyrnong Secondary	Melbourne, Australia
F	12	Hayley Duren	6 ft 4 in (1.93 m)	RS Fr	American Heritage	Fort Lauderdale, FL
G/F	14	Lacie Johnson	6 ft 0 in (1.83 m)	Fr	Pope	Marietta, GA
G	15	Keyari Sleezer	5 ft 11 in (1.8 m)	Jr	South Medford	Medford, OR
F	20	Tylinn Carter	6 ft 1 in (1.85 m)	RS Sr	Serra; Delaware State	San Diego, CA
G	21	Sydney Bordanaro	5 ft 7 in (1.7 m)	RS So	Burrell	Pittsburgh, PA
G	23	Barbara Sitanggan	5 ft 6 in (1.68 m)	So	Troy HS	Fullerton, CA
F	25	Yasmine Robinson-Bacote	5 ft 11 in (1.8 m)	Jr	Hillside	Hillside, NJ
G	32	Mia Satie	5 ft 10 in (1.78 m)	Fr	Iona Presentation	Perth, Australia

Head coach

- DeLisha Milton-Jones (Florida)

Assistant coach(es)

- Josh Pace (Syracuse)
- BJ Porter (Azusa Pacific)
- Roland Jones Jr. (Central Methodist)

Legend

- (C) Team captain
- (S) Suspended
- (I) Ineligible
- (W) Walk-on
- Injured
- Current redshirt

Roster
Last update: January 13, 2018

== Schedule ==
Date time, TV	Rank^{#}	Opponent^{#}	Result	Record	Site (attendance) city, state
Non-conference regular season
11/10/2017*; 2:00 pm		at Long Beach State	W 83–71	1–0	Walter Pyramid (739); Long Beach, CA
11/12/2017*; 2:00 pm		at UC Davis	L 64–69	1–1	The Pavilion (482); Davis, CA
11/12/2017*; 2:00 pm		at Nevada	W 77–72	2–1	Lawlor Events Center (1,025); Reno, NV
11/19/2017*; 1:00 pm		Seattle	L 62–65	2–2	Firestone Fieldhouse (267); Malibu, CA
11/21/2017*; 1:00 pm		Idaho State	W 80–74	3–2	Firestone Fieldhouse (178); Malibu, CA
11/30/2017*; 7:00 pm		at UC Irvine	L 74–75	3–3	Bren Events Center (264); Irvine, CA
12/02/2017*; 1:00 pm		Utah Valley	W 71–44	4–3	Firestone Fieldhouse (273); Malibu, CA
12/05/2017*; 5:00 pm		at Utah	L 65–89	4–4	Jon M. Huntsman Center (1,308); Salt Lake City, UT
12/07/2017*; 6:00 pm		at Weber State	L 61–71	4–5	Dee Events Center (746); Ogden, UT
12/17/2017*; 1:00 pm		New Mexico State	L 64–86	4–6	Firestone Fieldhouse (202); Malibu, CA
WCC regular season
12/28/2017; 4:00 pm		Santa Clara	W 56–55	5–6 (1–0)	Firestone Fieldhouse (278); Malibu, CA
12/30/2017; 1:00 pm		San Diego	W 66–62	6–6 (2–0)	Firestone Fieldhouse (267); Malibu, CA
01/04/2018; 6:00 pm		at Gonzaga	L 51–73	6–7 (2–1)	McCarthey Athletic Center (5,452); Spokane, WA
01/06/2018; 2:00 pm		at San Francisco	L 66–67	6–8 (2–2)	War Memorial Gymnasium (348); San Francisco, CA
01/11/2018; 7:00 pm		BYU	L 67–73	6–9 (2–3)	Firestone Fieldhouse (187); Malibu, CA
01/13/2018; 2:00 pm		at Saint Mary's	L 62–75	6–10 (2–4)	McKeon Pavilion (294); Moraga, CA
01/18/2018; 7:00 pm		Pacific	L 77–85	6–11 (2–5)	Firestone Fieldhouse (172); Malibu, CA
01/20/2018; 1:00 pm		San Francisco	W 95–92 ^{2OT}	7–11 (3–5)	Firestone Fieldhouse (142); Malibu, CA
01/25/2018; 7:00 pm		at Loyola Marymount	L 60–75	7–13 (3–6)	Gersten Pavilion (388); Los Angeles, CA
01/27/2018; 2:00 pm		at Santa Clara	W 54–50	7–13 (3–7)	Leavey Center (401); Santa Clara, CA
02/01/2018; 7:00 pm		Portland	W 83–79	8–13 (4–7)	Firestone Fieldhouse (183); Malibu, CA
02/03/2018; 2:00 pm		at Pacific	L 73–84	8–14 (4–8)	Alex G. Spanos Center (606); Stockton, CA
02/08/2017; 6:00 pm		at San Diego	L 53–79	8–15 (4–9)	Jenny Craig Pavilion (376); San Diego, CA
02/10/2018; 2:00 pm		Loyola Marymount	W 85–74	9–15 (5–9)	Firestone Fieldhouse (297); Malibu, CA
02/15/2018; 6:00 pm, BYUtv		at BYU	L 43–78	9–16 (5–10)	Marriott Center (672); Provo, UT
02/17/2018; 1:00 pm		Gonzaga	L 48–67	9–17 (5–11)	Firestone Fieldhouse (223); Malibu, CA
02/22/2018; 7:00 pm		Saint Mary's	L 75–82	9–18 (5–12)	Firestone Fieldhouse (219); Malibu, CA
02/24/2018; 2:00 pm		at Portland	L 58–82	9–19 (5–13)	Chiles Center (507); Portland, OR
WCC Women's Tournament
03/01/2018; 2:00 pm, BYUtv	(8)	vs. (9) Santa Clara; First Round	W 74–63	10–19	Orleans Arena; Paradise, NV
03/02/2018; 12:00 pm, BYUtv	(8)	vs. (1) Gonzaga; Quarterfinals	L 70–81	10–20	Orleans Arena; Paradise, NV
*Non-conference game. ^{#}Rankings from AP Poll. (#) Tournament seedings in parentheses. All times are in Pacific Time.

== See also ==
- 2017–18 Pepperdine Waves men's basketball team
