= 2017–18 Santa Clara Broncos women's basketball team =

Intercollegiate basketball season

2017–18 Santa Clara Broncos women's basketball
- Conference: West Coast Conference
- Record: 9–21 (5–13 WCC)
- Head coach: Bill Carr (2nd season)
- Assistant coaches: Michael Floyd; Kristin Iwanaga; Taelor Karr
- Home arena: Leavey Center

2017–18 West Coast Conference women's basketball standings
	Conf.				Overall
Team	W		L	PCT	W		L	PCT
Gonzaga †	17	–	1	.944	27	–	6	.818
Saint Mary's	13	–	5	.722	20	–	11	.645
Loyola Marymount	11	–	7	.611	19	–	11	.633
BYU	11	–	7	.611	16	–	14	.533
San Francisco	10	–	8	.556	16	–	15	.516
San Diego	8	–	10	.444	17	–	15	.531
Pacific	7	–	11	.389	15	–	17	.469
Pepperdine	5	–	13	.278	10	–	21	.323
Santa Clara	5	–	13	.278	9	–	21	.300
Portland	3	–	15	.167	7	–	23	.233
† 2018 WCC tournament winner As of 17 March 2018; Rankings from AP poll

The 2017–18 Santa Clara Broncos women's basketball team represented Santa Clara University in the 2017–18 college basketball season. The Broncos were led by second year head coach Bill Carr. The Broncos were members of the West Coast Conference and played their home games at the Leavey Center. They finished the season 9–21, 5–13 in WCC play to finish in a tie for eighth place. They lost in the first round of the WCC women's tournament to Pepperdine.

== Previous season ==
They finished the season 14–16, 9–9 in WCC play to finish in a tie for fifth place. They lost in the quarterfinals of the WCC women's tournament to Saint Mary's.

== Roster ==
2017–18 Santa Clara Broncos women's basketball team
Players
Coaches

Pos.	#	Name	Height	Year	Previous school	Hometown
F	0	Erica Meyer (redshirt)	6 ft 3 in (1.91 m)	Jr	Wilton; Providence	Wilton, CT
G	3	Taylor Berry	5 ft 11 in (1.8 m)	Sr	St. Mary's	Martinez, CA
G	4	Dru Toleafoa	6 ft 0 in (1.83 m)	Jr	Brigidine College Randwick	Sydney, Australia
G	11	Ruobing Bai	5 ft 8 in (1.73 m)	So	Tsinghua	Henan, China
G	12	Kyla Martin	5 ft 5 in (1.65 m)	Sr	Etiwanda; East Los Angeles College	Chino, CA
F	13	Joeseta Fatuesi (redshirt)	6 ft 4 in (1.93 m)	Sr	Wilcox HS; Utah	Santa Clara, CA
F	20	Lauren Yearwood (redshirt)	6 ft 3 in (1.91 m)	Jr	Oak Bay HS; Oregon	Victoria, BC
F	21	Naomi Jimenez	6 ft 0 in (1.83 m)	So	Westtown School	Albrightsville, PA
F	22	Ashlyn Herlihy	6 ft 1 in (1.85 m)	Fr	Arroyo Grande	Arroyo Grande, CA
G	23	Alexus Brigham	5 ft 8 in (1.73 m)	Fr	Northwest	Fort Worth, TX
G	24	Madison Piper	5 ft 11 in (1.8 m)	Fr	Lawrence Free State	Lawrence, KS
G	25	Emily Wolph	5 ft 5 in (1.65 m)	Jr	Desert Vista	Phoenix, AZ
F	30	Andraya Flor	6 ft 0 in (1.83 m)	Jr	Seattle Prep	Seattle, WA
F	32	Morgan McGwire	6 ft 2 in (1.88 m)	Sr	Reno	Reno, NV
F	33	Tamia Braggs	6 ft 2 in (1.88 m)	So	Lincoln	Tacoma, WA
G	44	Charise Holloway	5 ft 9 in (1.75 m)	Jr	St. Mary's; Arizona	Tracy, CA

Head coach

- Bill Carr (San Francisco)

Assistant coach(es)

- Michael Floyd (Murray State)
- Kristin Iwanaga (California)
- Taelor Karr (Gonzaga)

Legend

- (C) Team captain
- (S) Suspended
- (I) Ineligible
- (W) Walk-on
- Injured
- Current redshirt

Roster
Last update: January 13, 2018

== Schedule and results ==
Date time, TV	Rank^{#}	Opponent^{#}	Result	Record	Site (attendance) city, state
Exhibition
11/01/2017*; 7:00 pm		UC Santa Cruz	W 71–32		Leavey Center (343); Santa Clara, CA
11/06/2017*; 7:00 pm		San Francisco State	W 74–39		Leavey Center; Santa Clara, CA
Non-conference regular season
11/11/2017*; 6:00 pm		Cal State Fullerton	L 69–73	0–1	Leavey Center (414); Santa Clara, CA
11/14/2017*; 7:00 pm		UC Santa Barbara	W 68–63	1–1	Leavey Center (303); Santa Clara, CA
11/17/2017*; 7:00 pm		USC	L 43–64	1–2	Leavey Center (395); Santa Clara, CA
11/22/2017*; 11:00 am		at Northwestern	L 47–57	1–3	Beardsley Gym (628); Evanston, IL
11/25/2017*; 11:00 am, ESPN3		at UIC	W 45–36	2–3	UIC Pavilion (207); Chicago, IL
11/28/2017*; 7:00 pm		San Jose State	L 66–71 ^{OT}	2–4	Leavey Center (417); Santa Clara, CA
12/02/2017*; 2:00 pm		No. 24 California	L 41–79	2–5	Leavey Center (517); Santa Clara, CA
12/10/2017*; 2:00 pm		Menlo	W 104–61	3–5	Leavey Center (372); Santa Clara, CA
12/14/2017*; 6:30 pm		at San Diego State	W 48–34	4–5	Viejas Arena (617); San Diego, CA
12/16/2017*; 4:00 pm		at Nevada	L 41–52	4–6	Lawlor Events Center (1,457); Reno, NV
12/21/2017*; 1:00 pm		at Grand Canyon	L 38–39	4–7	GCU Arena (301); Phoenix, AZ
WCC regular season
12/28/2017; 4:00 pm		at Pepperdine	L 55–56	4–8 (0–1)	Firestone Fieldhouse (278); Malibu, CA
12/30/2017; 2:00 pm		Gonzaga	L 51–63	4–9 (0–2)	Leavey Center (402); Santa Clara, CA
01/04/2018; 7:00 pm		Loyola Marymount	L 51–65	4–10 (0–3)	Leavey Center (390); Santa Clara, CA
01/06/2018; 2:00 pm		at Portland	W 50–43	5–10 (1–3)	Chiles Center (333); Portland, OR
01/11/2018; 6:30 pm		at Saint Mary's	L 46–59	5–11 (1–4)	McKeon Pavilion (321); Moraga, CA
01/13/2018; 1:00 pm, BYUtv		at BYU	L 47–65	5–12 (1–5)	Marriott Center (881); Provo, UT
01/18/2018; 7:00 pm		San Francisco	L 54–58	5–13 (1–6)	Leavey Center (642); Santa Clara, CA
01/20/2017; 2:00 pm		at Gonzaga	L 44–71	5–14 (1–7)	McCarthey Athletic Center (6,000); Spokane, WA
01/25/2018; 7:00 pm		San Diego	W 59–50	6–14 (2–7)	Leavey Center (256); Santa Clara, CA
01/27/2018; 2:00 pm		Pepperdine	W 54–50	7–14 (3–7)	Leavey Center (401); Santa Clara, CA
02/01/2018; 7:00 pm		at Pacific	L 37–55	7–15 (3–8)	Alex G. Spanos Center (335); Stockton, CA
02/03/2018; 2:00 pm		at San Francisco	L 47–64	7–16 (3–9)	War Memorial Gymnasium (358); San Francisco, CA
02/08/2018; 7:00 pm		BYU	L 34–55	7–17 (3–10)	Leavey Center (200); Santa Clara, CA
02/10/2018; 2:00 pm		at San Diego	L 40–51	7–18 (3–11)	Jenny Craig Pavilion (354); San Diego, CA
02/15/2018; 7:00 pm		Portland	W 67–57	8–18 (4–11)	Leavey Center (303); Santa Clara, CA
02/17/2018; 2:00 pm		Pacific	W 57–55	9–18 (5–11)	Leavey Center (1,075); Santa Clara, CA
02/22/2018; 7:00 pm		at Loyola Marymount	L 45–64	9–19 (5–12)	Gersten Pavilion (390); Los Angeles, CA
02/24/2018; 2:00 pm		Saint Mary's	L 51–72	9–20 (5–13)	Leavey Center (527); Santa Clara, CA
WCC Women's Tournament
03/01/2018; 12:00 pm, BYUtv	(9)	vs. (8) Pepperdine; First Round	L 63–74	9–21	Orleans Arena; Paradise, NV
*Non-conference game. ^{#}Rankings from AP Poll. (#) Tournament seedings in parentheses. All times are in Pacific Time.

== See also ==
- 2017–18 Santa Clara Broncos men's basketball team
