= 2018 West Coast Conference women's basketball tournament =

Sports tournament

- Classification: Division I
- Season: 2017–18
- Teams: 10
- Finals site: Orleans Arena; Paradise, Nevada
- Champions: Gonzaga (8th title)
- Winning coach: Lisa Fortier (2nd title)
- MVP: Jill Barta (Gonzaga)
- Attendance: 33,676 (total)
- Television: ESPNU/BYUtv

2017–18 West Coast Conference women's basketball standings
	Conf.				Overall
Team	W		L	PCT	W		L	PCT
Gonzaga †	17	–	1	.944	27	–	6	.818
Saint Mary's	13	–	5	.722	20	–	11	.645
Loyola Marymount	11	–	7	.611	19	–	11	.633
BYU	11	–	7	.611	16	–	14	.533
San Francisco	10	–	8	.556	16	–	15	.516
San Diego	8	–	10	.444	17	–	15	.531
Pacific	7	–	11	.389	15	–	17	.469
Pepperdine	5	–	13	.278	10	–	21	.323
Santa Clara	5	–	13	.278	9	–	21	.300
Portland	3	–	15	.167	7	–	23	.233
† 2018 WCC tournament winner As of 17 March 2018; Rankings from AP poll

The 2018 West Coast Conference women's basketball tournament was the postseason women's basketball tournament for the West Coast Conference for the 2017–18 season. All tournament games were played at the Orleans Arena in Paradise, Nevada March 1–6, 2018. Regular-season champion Gonzaga won the tournament and with it the WCC's automatic berth in the NCAA tournament.

== Seeds ==
WCC tiebreaker procedures went as follows:

1. Head-to-head
2. Record against the top-seeded team(s) not involved in the tie, going down through the seedings as needed
3. Higher RPI

Seed	School	Conference	Overall*	Tiebreaker
1	Gonzaga	17–1	24–5	
2	Saint Mary's	13–5	20–9	
3	BYU	11–7	16–13	2–0 vs. LMU
4	Loyola Marymount	11–7	19–10	0–2 vs. BYU
5	San Francisco	10–8	15–14	
6	San Diego	8–10	15–14	
7	Pacific	7–11	13–16	
8	Pepperdine	5–13	9–20	2–0 vs. SCU
9	Santa Clara	5–13	9–19	0–2 vs. PEP
10	Portland	3–15	7–22	

* Overall record at end of regular season.

== Schedule ==
Session	Game	Time*	Matchup^{#}	Television	Attendance
First round – Thursday March 1, 2018
1	1	12:00 PM	#8 Pepperdine vs. #9 Santa Clara	BYUtv	6,685
1	2	2:00 PM	#7 Pacific vs. #10 Portland	BYUtv	6,685
Quarterfinals – Thursday March 1 & Friday March 2, 2018
2	3	6:00 PM	#3 BYU vs. #6 San Diego	BYUtv	6,685
2	4	8:00 PM	#4 Loyola Marymount vs. #5 San Francisco	BYUtv	6,685
3	5	12:00 PM	#1 Gonzaga vs. #8 Pepperdine	BYUtv	6,813
3	6	2:00 PM	#2 Saint Mary's vs. #7 Pacific	BYUtv	6,813
Semifinals – Monday, March 5, 2018
4	7	12:00 PM	#1 Gonzaga vs #5 San Francisco	BYUtv	6,832
4	8	2:00 PM	#7 Pacific vs #6 San Diego	BYUtv	6,832
Championship – Tuesday, March 6, 2018
5	9	1:00 PM	#1 Gonzaga vs. #6 San Diego	ESPNU	6,661
*Game times in PT. #-Rankings denote tournament seeding.

== Bracket and scores ==
- All BYUtv games were simulcast online and streamed at TheW.tv.

First round
8	Pepperdine	74
9	Santa Clara	63
7	Pacific	85
10	Portland	60

Quarterfinals
1	Gonzaga	81
8	Pepperdine	70
4	Loyola Marymount	76
5	San Francisco	89
2	Saint Mary's	73
7	Pacific	77
3	BYU	56
6	San Diego	61

Semifinals
1	Gonzaga	65
5	San Francisco	53
7	Pacific	56
6	San Diego	66

Finals
1	Gonzaga	79
6	San Diego	71

== See also ==
- 2017–18 NCAA Division I women's basketball season
- West Coast Conference men's basketball tournament
- 2018 West Coast Conference men's basketball tournament
- West Coast Conference women's basketball tournament
