= 2017–18 BYU Cougars women's basketball team =

Intercollegiate basketball season

2017–18 BYU Cougars women's basketball
- Conference: West Coast Conference
- Record: 16–14 (11–7 WCC)
- Head coach: Jeff Judkins (17th season)
- Assistant coaches: Ray Stewart (7th season); Dan Nielson (5th season); Ashley Garfield (1st season)
- Home arena: Marriott Center

2017–18 West Coast Conference women's basketball standings
	Conf.				Overall
Team	W		L	PCT	W		L	PCT
Gonzaga †	17	–	1	.944	27	–	6	.818
Saint Mary's	13	–	5	.722	20	–	11	.645
Loyola Marymount	11	–	7	.611	19	–	11	.633
BYU	11	–	7	.611	16	–	14	.533
San Francisco	10	–	8	.556	16	–	15	.516
San Diego	8	–	10	.444	17	–	15	.531
Pacific	7	–	11	.389	15	–	17	.469
Pepperdine	5	–	13	.278	10	–	21	.323
Santa Clara	5	–	13	.278	9	–	21	.300
Portland	3	–	15	.167	7	–	23	.233
† 2018 WCC tournament winner As of 17 March 2018; Rankings from AP poll

The 2017–18 BYU Cougars women's basketball team represented Brigham Young University during the 2017–18 NCAA Division I women's basketball season. It was head coach Jeff Judkins's seventeenth season at BYU. The Cougars, members of the West Coast Conference, played their home games at the Marriott Center. They finished the season 16–14, 11–7 in WCC play to finish in a tie for third place. They lost in the quarterfinals of the WCC women's tournament to San Diego. They missed the postseason tournament for the first time since 2009.

== Before the season ==
=== Departures ===
Name	Number	Pos.	Height	Year	Hometown	Notes
Jessica Chatman	2	F	6'0	Freshman	Ridgefield, Washington	
Makenzi Pulsipher	23	G	5'8	RS Senior	Draper, Utah	Graduated
Kristine Nelson	22	G/F	5'11	RS Senior	Crystal Beach, Florida	Graduated
Kalani Purcell	32	F	6'2"	Senior	Hamilton, New Zealand	Graduated; Invited to training camp with the Dallas Wings
Micaelee Orton	34	F	6'2	Senior	Kearns, Utah	Graduated
Brooke Clawson (Romney)	35	F	6'1	RS Junior	Dallas, Texas	Graduated
Melinda Bendall	XX	Asst. Coach			Murray, Utah	Retired from coaching

== 2017–18 media ==
=== BYU Radio Sports Network Affiliates ===
Cougar games that don't conflict with men's basketball or football games will be featured live on BYU Radio, found nationwide on Dish Network 980, on Sirius XM 143, and online at www.byuradio.org. Home games will be a BYUtv simulcast. Select road games will air on TheW.tv powered by Stadium.

== Roster ==
2017–18 BYU Cougars women's basketball team
Players
Coaches

Pos.	#	Name	Height	Year	Previous school	Hometown
G	1	Brenna Chase	5 ft 9 in (1.75 m)	So	Broomfield	Thornton, CO
F	3	Shalae Salmon	6 ft 3 in (1.91 m)	So	Wellington Girls' College	Porirua, New Zealand
F	4	Amanda Wayment	6 ft 1 in (1.85 m)	Sr	Fremont	Ogden, UT
G	5	Maria Albiero	5 ft 8 in (1.73 m)	Fr	Neusa Christian	Londrina, Brazil
G	10	Abby Mangum	6 ft 0 in (1.83 m)	RS Fr	Eagle	Eagle, ID
G	11	Liz Eaton	5 ft 10 in (1.78 m)	So	Maple Mountain	Mapleton, UT
G	13	Paisley Johnson	5 ft 9 in (1.75 m)	Fr	Glacier Peak	Everett, WA
F	15	Malli Valgardson	6 ft 5 in (1.96 m)	Fr	Pleasant Grove	Pleasant Grove, UT
G	20	Cassie Broadhead	5 ft 8 in (1.73 m)	RS Sr	Scotia Glenville	Glenville, NY
G	21	Khaedin Taito	5 ft 11 in (1.8 m)	RS So	Palm Beach Currumbin High School; USC	Hastings, New Zealand
C	22	Sara Hamson	6 ft 7 in (2.01 m)	Fr	Pleasant Grove	Lindon, UT
G	24	Ashley Beckstrand	5 ft 7 in (1.7 m)	Fr	Desert Hills	St. George, UT
F	33	Jasmine Moody	6 ft 2 in (1.88 m)	Jr	Radford	Honolulu, HI
F	43	Haley Rydalch	6 ft 3 in (1.91 m)	RS Jr	Desert Hills/Purdue	St. George, UT
C	50	MaCayla Hanks Longson	6 ft 4 in (1.93 m)	Jr	Mountain Crest	Millville, UT

Head coach

- Jeff Judkins (Utah)

Assistant coach(es)

- Ray Stewart (Utah Valley)
- Dan Nielson (BYU)
- Ashley Garfield (BYU)
- Kim Parker Beeston- Director of Operations (BYU)

Legend

- (C) Team captain
- (S) Suspended
- (I) Ineligible
- (W) Walk-on
- Injured
- Current redshirt

Roster

== Schedule ==
Date time, TV	Rank^{#}	Opponent^{#}	Result	Record	Site city, state
Exhibition
11/02/2017*; 7:00 pm, TheW.tv		Colorado Mesa	W 86–68	–	Marriott Center; Provo, UT
Non-conference regular season
11/10/2017*; 7:00 pm, TheW.tv		Southern Utah	W 75–67 ^{OT}	1–0	Marriott Center; Provo, UT
11/15/2017*; 8:00 pm, P12+ WA		at Washington	L 72–80	1–1	Alaska Airlines Arena; Seattle, WA
11/17/2017*; 7:00 pm, Pluto TV 234		at Eastern Washington	W 73–69	2–1	Reese Court; Cheney, WA
11/21/2017*; 11:00 am, BYUtv		Utah Valley; UCCU Crosstown Clash	W 75–54	3–1	Marriott Center; Provo, UT
11/25/2017*; 2:00 pm, BYUtv		Georgia	L 63–79	3–2	Marriott Center; Provo, UT
11/30/2017*; 7:00 pm, CET; Pluto TV 241		at Northern Colorado	L 74–79	3–3	Bank of Colorado Arena; Greeley, CO
12/02/2017*; 2:00 pm, Stadium		at Colorado State	L 54–56	3–4	Moby Arena; Fort Collins, CO
12/06/2017*; 4:00 pm, BYUtv		Utah State	L 69–76	3–5	Marriott Center; Provo, UT
12/09/2017*; 2:00 pm, BYUtv		Utah; Deseret First Duel	W 77–68	4–5	Marriott Center; Provo, UT
12/16/2017*; 6:00 pm, P12N BAY		at No. 24 Cal	L 45–70	4–6	Haas Pavilion; Berkeley, CA
12/22/2017*; 2:00 pm, BYUtv		Montana State	W 75–54	5–6	Marriott Center; Provo, UT
WCC regular season
12/28/2017; 8:00 pm, TheW.tv		at Portland	W 72–58	6–6 (1–0)	Chiles Center; Portland, OR
12/30/2017; 3:00 pm, TheW.tv		at Saint Mary's	L 49–57	6–7 (1–1)	McKeon Pavilion; Moraga, CA
01/04/2018; 7:00 pm, BYUtv		San Francisco	W 70–66	7–7 (2–1)	Marriott Center; Provo, UT
01/06/2018; 2:00 pm, BYUtv		Pacific	W 77–65	8–7 (3–1)	Marriott Center; Provo, UT
01/11/2018; 8:00 pm, TheW.tv		at Pepperdine	W 73–67	9–7 (4–1)	Firestone Fieldhouse; Malibu, CA
01/13/2018; 2:00 pm, BYUtv		Santa Clara	W 65–47	10–7 (5–1)	Marriott Center; Provo, UT
01/18/2018; 1:00 pm, TheW.tv		at Loyola Marymount	W 67–55	11–7 (6–1)	Gersten Pavilion; Los Angeles, CA
01/20/2018; 3:00 pm, TheW.tv		at San Diego	L 69–70	11–8 (6–2)	Jenny Craig Pavilion; San Diego, CA
01/25/2018; 7:00 pm, BYUtv		Saint Mary's	W 63–54	12–8 (7–2)	Marriott Center; Provo, UT
01/27/2018; 3:00 pm, TheW.tv		at Pacific	L 76–83	12–9 (7–3)	Alex G. Spanos Center; Stockton, CA
02/01/2018; 7:00 pm, BYUtv		Loyola Marymount	W 62–52	13–9 (8–3)	Marriott Center; Provo, UT
02/03/2018; 2:00 pm, BYUtv		Gonzaga	L 70–84	13–10 (8–4)	Marriott Center; Provo, UT
02/08/2018; 8:00 pm, TheW.tv		at Santa Clara	W 55–34	14–10 (9–4)	Leavey Center; Santa Clara, CA
02/10/2018; 3:00 pm, TheW.tv		at San Francisco	L 73–76	14–11 (9–5)	The Sobrato Center; San Francisco, CA
02/15/2018; 7:00 pm, BYUtv		Pepperdine	W 78–43	15–11 (10–5)	Marriott Center; Provo, UT
02/17/2018; 2:00 pm, BYUtv		San Diego	L 60–66	15–12 (10–6)	Marriott Center; Provo, UT
02/22/2018; 7:00 pm, BYUtv		Portland	W 73–35	16–12 (11–6)	Marriott Center; Provo, UT
02/24/2018; 3:00 pm, SWX; TheW.tv		at Gonzaga	L 37–62	16–13 (11–7)	McCarthey Athletic Center; Spokane, WA
WCC Tournament
03/01/2018; 7:00 pm, BYUtv	(3)	vs. (6) San Diego; Quarterfinals	L 56–61	16–14	Orleans Arena; Paradise, NV
*Non-conference game. ^{#}Rankings from AP Poll / Coaches' Poll. (#) Tournament seedings in parentheses. All times are in Mountain.

== Game summaries ==
=== Exhibition: Colorado Mesa ===
Broadcasters: Robbie Bullough & Keilani Unga
Starting Lineups:

- Colorado Mesa: Erin Reichle, Jaylyn Duran, Kelli Van Tassel, Karina Brandon, Ma'ata Epenisa
- BYU: Brenna Chase, Shalae Salmon, Amanda Wayment, Malia Nawahine, Cassie Devashrayee

Nov 2	Colorado Mesa Mavericks	68–86	BYU Cougars	Marriott Center Provo, UT
7:05 p.m. MDT	Scoring by quarter: 14–26, 19–21, 16–18, 19–21
TheW.tv	Pts: Erin Reichle 24; Rebs: Ma'ata Epenisa, Tori Catlett 5 Asts: Erin Reichle, Jaylyn Duran, Sophie Anderson 3	Recap	Pts: Cassie Devashrayee 16; Rebs: Shalae Salmon 11; Asts: Cassie Devashrayee 6	Attendance: 425; Referees: Kyle Bacon, Julie Krommenhoek, Jen Zylstra

=== Southern Utah ===
Broadcasters: Robbie Bullough & Makenzi Pulsipher
Series History: BYU leads 18–3
Starting Lineups:

- Southern Utah: Rebecca Cardenas, Ashley Larsen, Breanu Reid, Whitney Johnson, Peyton Torgerson
- BYU: Brenna Chase, Shalae Salmon, Amanda Wayment, Malia Nawahine, Cassie Devashrayee

Nov 10	Southern Utah T-Birds	67–75(OT)	BYU Cougars	Marriott Center Provo, UT
7:05 p.m. MDT	Scoring by quarter: 11–23, 20–11, 16–9, 14–18, Overtime: 6–14
TheW.tv	Pts: Whitney Johnson 12; Rebs: Ashley Larsen 10; Asts: Rebecca Cardenas 6	Recap	Pts: Malia Nawahine 19; Rebs: Shalae Salmon 17; Asts: Malia Nawahine 5	Attendance: 972; Referees: Brian Woods, Nicole Leon, Erick Thorne

=== Washington ===
Broadcasters: Gary Hill Jr. & Elise Woodward
Series History: Washington leads 6–5
Starting Lineups:

- BYU: Brenna Chase, Shalae Salmon, Amanda Wayment, Malia Nawahine, Cassie Devashrayee
- Washington: Fapou Semebene, Amber Melgoza, Khalya Rooks, Jenna Moser, Missy Peterson

Nov 15	BYU Cougars	72–80	Washington Huskies	Alaska Airlines Arena Seattle, WA
7:00 p.m. PST	Scoring by quarter: 17–20, 25–29, 16–23, 14–8
P12+ WA	Pts: Cassie Devashrayee 22; Rebs: Shalae Salmon 15; Asts: Brenna Chase, Cassie Devashrayee 4	Recap	Pts: Amber Melgoza 20; Rebs: Amber Melgoza 8 Asts: Jenna Moser 3	Attendance: 1,442; Referees: Karen Lasuik, Melissa Barlow, Corey Long Jr.

=== Eastern Washington ===
Broadcaster: Luke Byrnes
Series History: BYU leads 3–1
Starting Lineups:

- BYU: Brenna Chase, Shalae Salmon, Amanda Wayment, Malia Nawahine, Cassie Devashrayee
- Eastern Washington: Uriah Howard, Symone Starks, Delaney Hodgins, Violet Kapri Morrow, Mariah Cunningham

Nov 17	BYU Cougars	73–69	Eastern Washington Eagles	Reese Court Cheney, WA
7:05 p.m. PST	Scoring by quarter: 9–15, 18–16, 22–22, 24–16
Pluto TV	Pts: Cassie Devashrayee 22; Rebs: Shalae Salmon 11; Asts: Paisley Johnson 3	Recap	Pts: Violet Kapri Morrow 25; Rebs: Violet Kapri Morrow 11; Asts: Delaney Hodgins 3	Attendance: 602; Referees: Brittany Groves, Karen Lasuik, Michol Murray

=== Utah Valley ===
Broadcasters: Spencer Linton, Kristen Kozlowski, & Jason Shepherd
Series History: BYU leads 7–0
Starting Lineups:

- Utah Valley: Mariah Seals, Britta Spencer, Gabrielle Leos, Taylor Christensen, Leya Harvey
- BYU: Brenna Chase, Shalae Salmon, Amanda Wayment, Malia Nawahine, Cassie Devashrayee

Nov 21	Southern Utah T-Birds	54–75	BYU Cougars	Marriott Center Provo, UT
11:05 a.m. MST	Scoring by quarter: 14–21, 5–11, 20–23, 15–20
BYUtv	Pts: Gabrielle Leos 16; Rebs: Gabrielle Leos 5 Asts: Mariah Seals 5	Recap	Pts: Malia Nawahine 21; Rebs: Shalae Salmon 8 Asts: Cassie Devashrayee 12	Attendance: 3,448; Referees: Anita Ortega, Shelley Nakasone, Ashley Ellis

=== Georgia ===
Broadcaster: Dave McCann & Kristen Kozlowski
Series History: Georgia leads 2–0
Starting Lineups:

- Georgia:
- BYU:

Nov 25	Georgia Lady Bulldogs	vs.	BYU Cougars	Marriott Center Provo, UT
2:05 PM MST
BYUtv

== See also ==
- 2017–18 BYU Cougars men's basketball team
