= 2018 Ohio Valley Conference women's basketball tournament =

- Classification: Division I
- Season: 2017–18
- Teams: 8
- Site: Ford Center; Evansville, Indiana
- Champions: Belmont (3rd title)
- Winning coach: Bart Brooks (1st title)
- MVP: Darby Maggard (Belmont)
- Television: ESPN+/ESPN3

2017–18 Ohio Valley Conference women's basketball standings
	Conf.				Overall
Team	W		L	PCT	W		L	PCT
No. 23 Belmont †	18	–	0	1.000	31	–	4	.886
UT Martin	13	–	5	.722	19	–	15	.559
SIU Edwardsville	13	–	5	.722	17	–	15	.531
Morehead State	12	–	6	.667	21	–	11	.656
Jacksonville State	12	–	6	.667	19	–	12	.613
Austin Peay	9	–	9	.500	16	–	14	.533
Southeast Missouri State	9	–	9	.500	14	–	17	.452
Murray State	7	–	11	.389	11	–	19	.367
Eastern Kentucky	5	–	13	.278	8	–	19	.296
Tennessee Tech	4	–	14	.222	7	–	22	.241
Tennessee State	4	–	14	.222	6	–	21	.222
Eastern Illinois	2	–	16	.111	3	–	26	.103
† 2018 OVC tournament winner As of March 17, 2018; Rankings from AP poll

The 2018 Ohio Valley Conference women's basketball tournament ended the 2017–18 season of Ohio Valley Conference women's basketball. The tournament was held February 28–March 3 at Ford Center in Evansville, Indiana. Regular-season champion Belmont won the tournament and with it the OVC's automatic berth in the NCAA tournament.

== Format ==
The OVC women's tournament is a traditional single-elimination tournament featuring the top eight teams in the conference regular-season standings. This differs from the format used in the OVC men's tournament; while that tournament also involves only eight of the league's 12 members, it has a radically different format, consisting of two stepladder brackets that produce the tournament finalists. The women's tournament is seeded so that the #8 seed faces the #1 seed in the first round, #7 faces #2, and so on. There is no reseeding, so if the #8 team were to defeat the #1 seed it would continue in the tournament playing the team which would have faced the #1 seed in the subsequent round (winner of #4 vs. #5).

== Seeds ==
Seed	School	Conference	Overall	Tiebreaker
1	Belmont	18–0	28–3	
2	UT Martin	13–5	18–13	
3	SIUE	13–5	16–13	
4	Jacksonville State	12–6	18–11	
5	Morehead State	12–6	21–10	
6	Austin Peay	9–9	16–13	
7	Southeast Missouri	9–9	14–16	
8	Murray State	5–9	9–16	
–	Eastern Kentucky	5–9	8–15	
–	Tennessee Tech	3–11	6–19	
–	Tennessee State	3–11	5–18	
–	Eastern Illinois	1–13	2–23	

== Bracket ==
- All times central. Television

First round Wednesday, February 28 & Thursday, March 1 ESPN+/ESPN3; 1PM; 1PM; 3PM; 3PM
1	Belmont	88
8	Murray State	64
4	Jacksonville State	69
5	Morehead State	56
2	UT Martin	63
7	Southeast Missouri	60
3	SIUE	76
6	Austin Peay	43

Semifinals; Friday, March 2 ESPN+/ESPN3; 1PM; 3PM
1	Belmont	63
4	Jacksonville State	53
2	UT Martin	69
3	SIUE	67

Championship; Saturday, March 3 ESPN+/ESPN3; 2PM
1	Belmont	63
2	UT Martin	56
