= 2017–18 Saint Mary's Gaels women's basketball team =

Intercollegiate basketball season

2017–18 Saint Mary's Gaels women's basketball

WNIT, First Round
- Conference: West Coast Conference
- Record: 20–11 (13–5 WCC)
- Head coach: Paul Thomas (12th season)
- Assistant coaches: Tracy Sanders; Allyson Fasnacht; Lisa O'Meara
- Home arena: McKeon Pavilion

2017–18 West Coast Conference women's basketball standings
	Conf.				Overall
Team	W		L	PCT	W		L	PCT
Gonzaga †	17	–	1	.944	27	–	6	.818
Saint Mary's	13	–	5	.722	20	–	11	.645
Loyola Marymount	11	–	7	.611	19	–	11	.633
BYU	11	–	7	.611	16	–	14	.533
San Francisco	10	–	8	.556	16	–	15	.516
San Diego	8	–	10	.444	17	–	15	.531
Pacific	7	–	11	.389	15	–	17	.469
Pepperdine	5	–	13	.278	10	–	21	.323
Santa Clara	5	–	13	.278	9	–	21	.300
Portland	3	–	15	.167	7	–	23	.233
† 2018 WCC tournament winner As of 17 March 2018; Rankings from AP poll

The 2017–18 Saint Mary's Gaels women's basketball team represented Saint Mary's College of California in the 2017–18 NCAA Division I women's basketball season. The Gales, led by twelfth year head coach Paul Thomas, played their home games at the McKeon Pavilion and were members of the West Coast Conference. They finished the season 20–11, 13–5 in WCC play to finish in second place. They lost in the quarterfinals of the WCC women's tournament to Pacific. They received an automatic bid to the Women's National Invitation Tournament, where they lost to New Mexico in the first round.

== Previous season ==
They finished the season 20–13, 13–5 in WCC play to finish in a tie for second place. They advanced to the championship game of the WCC women's tournament where they lost to Gonzaga. They received an at-large bid to the WNIT where they lost to Colorado State in the first round.

== Roster ==
2017–18 Saint Mary's Gaels women's basketball team
Players
Coaches

Pos.	#	Name	Height	Year	Previous school	Hometown
G	1	Milly Yates	5 ft 10 in (1.78 m)	Fr	SCECGS Redlands	Sydney, Australia
G	3	Jasmine Forcadilla	5 ft 8 in (1.73 m)	RS So	St. Joseph's Catholic	Terrigal, Australia
F	5	Madeline Holland	5 ft 11 in (1.8 m)	Fr	Archbishop Mitty	Burlingame, CA
G	10	Carly Turner	5 ft 11 in (1.8 m)	Sr	Australian Institute of Sport	Sydney, Australia
G	11	Morgan Malloy	5 ft 3 in (1.6 m)	RS So	Justin-Siena	Napa, CA
F	12	Sydney Raggio	6 ft 1 in (1.85 m)	Jr	St. Ignatius	San Bruno, CA
F	13	Tyra Moe	6 ft 1 in (1.85 m)	So	Punhou	Honolulu, HI
G	14	Jordyn Boesel	5 ft 9 in (1.75 m)	Fr	Okanogan	Okanogan, WA
G	20	Katie Rathbun	6 ft 0 in (1.83 m)	Jr	Carondelet	Concord, CA
G	21	Stella Beck	6 ft 0 in (1.83 m)	Sr	Hutt Valley	Lower Hutt, New Zealand
G	23	Emily Codding	6 ft 0 in (1.83 m)	Fr	Santa Rosa	Santa Rosa, CA
G	24	Brianna Simonich	5 ft 10 in (1.78 m)	Fr	Carondelet	Danville, CA
F	25	Megan McKay	6 ft 3 in (1.91 m)	Jr	St. Mary's Anglican	Katanning, Australia
F	30	Joy Akaegbu-Cleveland	6 ft 2 in (1.88 m)	So	Gonzaga Prep	Spokane, WA
C	33	Claire Ferguson	6 ft 3 in (1.91 m)	RS So	St. Thomas Aquinas; TCU	Olathe, KS

Head coach

- Paul Thomas (Wayne State College)

Assistant coach(es)

- Tracy Sanders (St. Mary's)
- Allyson Fasnacht (Liberty)
- Lisa O'Meara (St. Mary's)

Legend

- (C) Team captain
- (S) Suspended
- (I) Ineligible
- (W) Walk-on
- Injured
- Current redshirt

Roster
Last update: January 13, 2018

== Schedule and results ==
Date time, TV	Rank^{#}	Opponent^{#}	Result	Record	Site (attendance) city, state
Non-conference regular season
11/10/2017*; 5:00 pm		at No. 20 California	L 80–87	0–1	Haas Pavilion (2,768); Berkeley, CA
11/12/2017*; 1:00 pm		Washington State	W 81–75	1–1	McKeon Pavilion (307); Moraga, CA
11/19/2017*; 1:00 pm, CHN		Cal Poly	W 82–64	2–1	McKeon Pavilion (356); Moraga, CA
11/24/2017*; 2:00 pm		UC Santa Barbara; Hilton Concord Classic	W 89–59	3–1	McKeon Pavilion (388); Moraga, CA
11/25/2017*; 2:00 pm		Indiana; Hilton Concord Classic	W 88–82	4–1	McKeon Pavilion (312); Moraga, CA
11/30/2017*; 6:00 pm		at Boise State	W 74–72	5–1	Taco Bell Arena (476); Boise, ID
12/02/2017*; 1:30 pm, P12N		at Utah	L 63–74	5–2	Jon M. Huntsman Center (1,086); Salt Lake City, UT
12/09/2017*; 1:00 pm		UC Davis	L 50–74	5–3	McKeon Pavilion (341); Moraga, CA
12/17/2017*; 11:30 am		vs. UT Martin; Basketball Travelers Inc. Invitational	W 69–58	6–3	Mackey Arena (6,193); West Lafayette, IN
12/18/2017*; 1:00 pm		vs. Eastern Washington; Basketball Travelers Inc. Invitational	W 76–56	7–3	Mackey Arena; West Lafayette, IN
12/19/2017*; 10:30 am		at Purdue; Basketball Travelers Inc. Invitational	L 60–70	7–4	Mackey Arena (6,510); West Lafayette, IN
WCC regular season
12/28/2017; 7:00 pm		at Loyola Marymount	L 57–69	7–5 (0–1)	Gersten Pavilion (324); Los Angeles, CA
12/30/2017; 2:00 pm		BYU	W 57–49	8–5 (1–1)	McKeon Pavilion (317); Moraga, CA
01/04/2018; 7:00 pm		at Pacific	W 70–69	9–5 (2–1)	Alex G. Spanos Center (290); Stockton, CA
01/06/2018; 2:00 pm		at San Diego	W 75–53	10–5 (3–1)	Jenny Craig Pavilion (346); San Diego, CA
01/11/2018; 6:30 pm		Santa Clara	W 59–46	11–5 (4–1)	McKeon Pavilion (321); Moraga, CA
01/13/2018; 2:00 pm		Pepperdine	W 75–62	12–5 (5–1)	McKeon Pavilion (294); Moraga, CA
01/18/2018; 6:30 pm		Gonzaga	L 65–73	12–6 (5–2)	McKeon Pavilion (476); Moraga, CA
01/20/2018; 2:00 pm		Pacific	W 96–88	13–6 (6–2)	McKeon Pavilion (428); Moraga, CA
01/25/2018; 6:00 pm, BYUtv		at BYU	L 54–63	13–7 (6–3)	Marriott Center (913); Provo, UT
01/27/2018; 2:00 pm		at Portland	L 65–68	13–8 (6–4)	Chiles Center (348); Portland, OR
02/01/2018; 7:00 pm		at San Francisco	W 73–59	14–8 (7–4)	War Memorial Gymnasium (473); San Francisco, CA
02/03/2018; 2:00 pm		San Diego	W 66–57	15–8 (8–4)	McKeon Pavilion (234); Moraga, CA
02/08/2018; 6:30 pm		Loyola Marymount	L 65–75	15–9 (8–5)	McKeon Pavilion (225); Moraga, CA
02/10/2018; 2:00 pm		at Gonzaga	W 72–56	16–9 (9–5)	McCarthey Athletic Center (6,000); Spokane, WA
02/15/2018; 6:30 pm		San Francisco	W 72–64	17–9 (10–5)	McKeon Pavilion (271); Moraga, CA
02/17/2018; 2:00 pm		Portland	W 77–49	18–9 (11–5)	McKeon Pavilion (421); Moraga, CA
02/22/2018; 7:00 pm		at Pepperdine	W 82–75	19–9 (12–5)	Firestone Fieldhouse (219); Malibu, CA
02/24/2018; 2:00 pm		at Santa Clara	W 72–51	20–9 (13–5)	Leavey Center (527); Santa Clara, CA
WCC Women's Tournament
03/02/2018; 2:00 pm, BYUtv	(2)	vs. (7) Pacific; Quarterfinals	L 73–77	20–10	Orleans Arena (6,813); Paradise, NV
WNIT
03/15/2018*; 6:00 pm		at New Mexico; First Round	L 80–82	20–11	Johnson Gymnasium (1,428); Albuquerque, NM
*Non-conference game. ^{#}Rankings from AP Poll. (#) Tournament seedings in parentheses. All times are in Pacific Time.

== See also ==
- 2017–18 Saint Mary's Gaels men's basketball team
