= 2017–18 Loyola Marymount Lions women's basketball team =

Intercollegiate basketball season

2017–18 Loyola Marymount Lions women's basketball
- Conference: West Coast Conference
- Record: 19–11 (11–7 WCC)
- Head coach: Charity Elliott (6th season)
- Associate head coach: April Phillips (2nd season)
- Assistant coaches: Chris Elliott; Nia Jackson
- Home arena: Gersten Pavilion

2017–18 West Coast Conference women's basketball standings
	Conf.				Overall
Team	W		L	PCT	W		L	PCT
Gonzaga †	17	–	1	.944	27	–	6	.818
Saint Mary's	13	–	5	.722	20	–	11	.645
Loyola Marymount	11	–	7	.611	19	–	11	.633
BYU	11	–	7	.611	16	–	14	.533
San Francisco	10	–	8	.556	16	–	15	.516
San Diego	8	–	10	.444	17	–	15	.531
Pacific	7	–	11	.389	15	–	17	.469
Pepperdine	5	–	13	.278	10	–	21	.323
Santa Clara	5	–	13	.278	9	–	21	.300
Portland	3	–	15	.167	7	–	23	.233
† 2018 WCC tournament winner As of 17 March 2018; Rankings from AP poll

The 2017–18 Loyola Marymount Lions women's basketball team represented Loyola Marymount University in the 2017–18 NCAA Division I women's basketball season. The Lions, led by sixth year head coach Charity Elliott, played their homes games at the Gersten Pavilion and were members of the West Coast Conference. They finished the season 19–11, 11–7 in WCC play to finish in a tie for third place. They lost in the quarterfinals of the WCC women's tournament to San Francisco. Despite having 19 wins, they were not invited to a postseason tournament.

== Previous season ==
They finished the season 14–16, 9–9 in WCC play to finish in a tie for fifth place. They lost in the quarterfinals of the WCC women's tournament to San Francisco.

== Roster ==
2017–18 Loyola Marymount Lions women's basketball team
Players
Coaches

Pos.	#	Name	Height	Year	Previous school	Hometown
G	1	Bianca Velasco	5 ft 8 in (1.73 m)	Jr	Mater Dei	Santa Ana, CA
G	2	Aiyana Barnes	5 ft 9 in (1.75 m)	Fr	Long Beach Polytechnic	Torrance, CA
G	3	Chelsey Gipson	5 ft 7 in (1.7 m)	Fr	Palisades	Los Angeles, CA
F	4	Cheyanne Wallace	6 ft 0 in (1.83 m)	Jr	Sierra Canyon	Woodland Hills, CA
G	11	Andee Velasco	5 ft 8 in (1.73 m)	Jr	Mater Dei	Santa Ana, CA
F	20	Jasmine Jones	5 ft 10 in (1.78 m)	Fr	Long Beach Polytechnic	Signal Hill, CA
C	22	Raychel Stanley	6 ft 2 in (1.88 m)	So	Bishop Gorman	Las Vegas, NV
F	24	Bree Alford	6 ft 0 in (1.83 m)	RS Jr	Miramonte	Walnut Creek, CA
F	30	NK Ilang	6 ft 0 in (1.83 m)	RS Jr	St. Anne's-Belfield	Ebonyi State, Nigeria
G/F	31	Brittney Reed	5 ft 10 in (1.78 m)	RS Fr	Vista Murrieta	Murrieta, GA
G	32	Makenzie Cast	5 ft 9 in (1.75 m)	Sr	Carondelet	Antioch, CA
F	33	Gabby Green	6 ft 2 in (1.88 m)	RS Jr	Saint Mary's; California	Oakland, CA
G	35	Cierra Belvin	5 ft 8 in (1.73 m)	So	Long Beach Poly	Long Beach, CA
F/C	42	Meghan Mandel (redshirt)	6 ft 4 in (1.93 m)	So	Orono; Marquette	Plymouth, MN
C	44	Josie Buckingham	6 ft 5 in (1.96 m)	RS Jr	New Richmond; Minnesota	New Richmond, OH

Head coach

- Charity Elliott (Missouri State)

Assistant coach(es)

- April Phillips (Xavier)
- Chris Elliott (Missouri State)
- Nia Jackson (Oregon)

Legend

- (C) Team captain
- (S) Suspended
- (I) Ineligible
- (W) Walk-on
- Injured
- Current redshirt

Roster
Last update: January 13, 2018

== Schedule ==
Date time, TV	Rank^{#}	Opponent^{#}	Result	Record	Site (attendance) city, state
Exhibition
11/07/2017*; 7:00 pm		Occidental	W 87–38		Gersten Pavilion; Los Angeles, CA
Non-conference regular season
11/10/2017*; 7:00 pm		at UC Riverside	W 67–59	1–0	SRC Arena (326); Riverside, CA
11/13/2017*; 2:00 pm		at Saint Louis	W 62–60	2–0	Chaifetz Arena; St. Louis, MO
11/17/2017*; 7:00 pm		at Long Beach State	W 84–69	3–0	Walter Pyramid (594); Long Beach, CA
11/21/2017*; 7:00 pm		Arizona	W 84–70	4–0	Gersten Pavilion (366); Los Angeles, CA
11/24/2017*; 3:30 pm		Miami (OH); LMU Thanksgiving Classic	W 84–71	5–0	Gersten Pavilion (351); Los Angeles, CA
11/25/2017*; 3:30 pm		Eastern Michigan; LMU Thanksgiving Classic	W 73–64	6–0	Gersten Pavilion (431); Los Angeles, CA
11/28/2017*; 5:00 pm		Cal State Dominguez Hills	W 84–52	7–0	Gersten Pavilion (161); Los Angeles, CA
12/01/2017*; 7:00 pm		USC	L 70–80	7–1	Gersten Pavilion (445); Los Angeles, CA
12/07/2017*; 7:00 pm		at UC Santa Barbara	Cancelled		The Thunderdome; Santa Barbara, CA
12/09/2017*; 2:00 pm		Cal State Northridge	L 68–75	7–2	Gersten Pavilion (286); Los Angeles, CA
12/18/2017*; 7:00 pm		UC Santa Barbara	W 67–61	8–2	Gersten Pavilion (215); Los Angeles, CA
12/20/2017*; 11:00 am		at SMU	L 60–63	8–3	Moody Coliseum (656); Dallas, TX
WCC regular season
12/28/2017; 7:00 pm		Saint Mary's	W 69–57	9–3 (1–0)	Gersten Pavilion (324); Los Angeles, CA
12/30/2017; 2:00 pm		Pacific	W 75–60	10–3 (2–0)	Gersten Pavilion (220); Los Angeles, CA
01/04/2018; 7:00 pm		at Santa Clara	W 65–51	11–3 (3–0)	Leavey Center (390); Santa Clara, CA
01/06/2018; 2:00 pm		at Gonzaga	L 67–77	11–4 (3–1)	McCarthey Athletic Center (5,638); Spokane, WA
01/11/2018; 7:00 pm		at San Francisco	L 60–78	11–5 (3–2)	War Memorial Gymnasium (281); San Francisco, CA
01/13/2018; 7:00 pm		San Diego	L 54–60	11–6 (3–3)	Gersten Pavilion (281); Los Angeles, CA
01/18/2018; 12:00 pm		BYU	L 55–67	11–7 (3–4)	Gersten Pavilion (3,760); Los Angeles, CA
01/20/2018; 2:00 pm		at Portland	W 63–60	12–7 (4–4)	Chiles Center (324); Portland, OR
01/25/2018; 7:00 pm		Pepperdine	W 75–60	13–7 (5–4)	Gersten Pavilion (388); Los Angeles, CA
01/27/2018; 2:00 pm		at San Diego	W 67–53	14–7 (6–4)	Jenny Craig Pavilion (373); San Diego, CA
02/01/2018; 6:00 pm, BYUtv		at BYU	L 52–62	14–8 (6–5)	Marriott Center (780); Provo, UT
02/03/2018; 2:00 pm		Portland	W 76–55	15–8 (7–5)	Gersten Pavilion (256); Los Angeles, CA
02/08/2018; 6:00 pm		at Saint Mary's	W 75–65	16–8 (8–5)	McKeon Pavilion (225); Moraga, CA
02/10/2018; 2:00 pm		at Pepperdine	L 74–85	16–9 (8–6)	Firestone Fieldhouse (297); Malibu, CA
02/15/2018; 7:00 pm		Gonzaga	L 69–75	16–10 (8–7)	Gersten Pavilion (259); Los Angeles, CA
02/17/2018; 2:00 pm		San Francisco	W 65–60	17–10 (9–7)	Gersten Pavilion (304); Los Angeles, CA
02/22/2018; 7:00 pm		Santa Clara	W 64–45	18–10 (10–7)	Gersten Pavilion (390); Los Angeles, CA
02/24/2018; 2:00 pm		at Pacific	W 79–77	19–10 (11–7)	Alex G. Spanos Center (609); Stockton, CA
WCC Women's Tournament
03/01/2018; 8:00 pm, BYUtv	(4)	vs. (5) San Francisco; Quarterfinals	L 76–89	19–11	Orleans Arena; Paradise, NV
*Non-conference game. ^{#}Rankings from AP Poll. (#) Tournament seedings in parentheses.

== See also ==
- 2017–18 Loyola Marymount Lions men's basketball team
