= 2018 MEAC women's basketball tournament =

- Classification: Division I
- Season: 2017–18
- Teams: 13
- Site: Norfolk Scope; Norfolk, Virginia
- Champions: North Carolina A&T (4th title)
- Winning coach: Tarrell Robinson (1st title)
- MVP: Kala Green (North Carolina A&T)
- Television: ESPN3

2017–18 MEAC women's basketball standings
	Conf.				Overall
Team	W		L	PCT	W		L	PCT
Bethune–Cookman	15	–	1	.938	24	–	7	.774
North Carolina A&T †	15	–	1	.938	23	–	9	.719
Hampton	12	–	4	.750	18	–	14	.563
Norfolk State	11	–	5	.688	18	–	11	.621
Morgan State	8	–	8	.500	16	–	15	.516
Howard	8	–	8	.500	12	–	18	.400
Maryland-Eastern Shore	7	–	9	.438	11	–	19	.367
North Carolina Central	7	–	9	.438	9	–	21	.300
South Carolina State	6	–	10	.375	12	–	18	.400
Coppin State	5	–	11	.313	6	–	23	.207
Delaware State	5	–	11	.313	6	–	24	.200
Florida A&M	4	–	12	.250	8	–	24	.250
Savannah State	1	–	15	.063	5	–	25	.167
† 2018 MEAC tournament winner As of 16 March 2018; Rankings from AP poll

The 2018 Mid-Eastern Athletic Conference women's basketball tournament took place March 5–10, 2018, at the Norfolk Scope in Norfolk, Virginia. First round games were played March 5 and March 6, with the quarterfinal games played on March 7 and 8. The semifinals were held March 9, with the championship game on March 10.

== Seeds ==
All 13 teams were eligible for the tournament.

Teams were seeded by record within the conference, with a tiebreaker system to seed teams with identical conference records.

Seed	School	Conference
1	North Carolina A&T	15–1
2	Bethune–Cookman	15–1
3	Hampton	12–4
4	Norfolk State	11–5
5	Howard	8–8
6	Morgan State	8–8
7	Maryland Eastern Shore	7–9
8	North Carolina Central	7–9
9	South Carolina State	6–10
10	Delaware State	5–11
11	Coppin State	5–11
12	Florida A&M	4–12
13	Savannah State	1–15
† – MEAC regular season champions. Overall records are as of the end of the regular season.

== Schedule ==
Session	Game	Time*	Matchup^{#}	Score	Television
First round – Monday, March 5
1	1	11:00 am	No. 13 Savannah State vs. No. 4 Norfolk State	51–48	ESPN3
1	2	1:30 pm	No. 12 Florida A&M vs. No. 5 Howard	69–64	ESPN3
1	3	4:00 pm	No. 11 Coppin State vs. No. 6 Morgan State	51–58	ESPN3
First round – Tuesday, March 6
2	4	11:00 am	No. 9 South Carolina State vs. No. 8 North Carolina Central	76–67	ESPN3
2	5	1:30 pm	No. 10 Delaware State vs. No. 7 Maryland Eastern Shore	60–77	ESPN3
Quarterfinals – Wednesday, March 7
4	6	12:00 pm	No. 9 South Carolina State vs. No. 1 North Carolina A&T	38–54	ESPN3
4	7	2:00 pm	No. 7 Maryland Eastern Shore vs. No. 2 Bethune-Cookman	65–71	ESPN3
Quarterfinals – Thursday, March 8
5	8	12:00 pm	No. 6 Morgan State vs. No. 3 Hampton	57–66	ESPN3
5	9	2:00 pm	No. 13 Savannah State vs. No. 12 Florida A&M	64–66	ESPN3
Semifinals – Friday, March 9
6	10	12:00 pm	No. 12 Florida A&M vs. No. 1 North Carolina A&T	61–65	ESPN3
6	11	2:00 pm	No. 3 Hampton vs. No. 2 Bethune-Cookman	61–60	ESPN3
Championship – Saturday, March 10
7	12	3:30 pm	No. 3 Hampton vs. No. 1 North Carolina A&T	65–72 (OT)	ESPN3
*Game times in EST. #-Rankings denote tournament seeding.

== Bracket ==
First round March 5 and 6
8	North Carolina Central	67
9	South Carolina State	76
4	Norfolk State	48
13	Savannah State	51
5	Howard	64
12	Florida A&M	69
7	Maryland East Shore	77
10	Delaware State	59
6	Morgan State	58
11	Coppin State	51

Quarterfinals; March 7 and 8
1	North Carolina A&T	54
9	South Carolina State	38
13	Savannah State	64
12	Florida A&M	66
2	Bethune–Cookman	71
7	Maryland Eastern Shore	65
3	Hampton	66
6	Morgan State	57

Semifinals; March 9
1	North Carolina A&T	65
12	Florida A&M	61
2	Bethune–Cookman	60
3	Hampton	61

Championship; March 10; ESPN3
1	North Carolina A&T	72
3	Hampton	65
