= 2017–18 UT Martin Skyhawks women's basketball team =

Intercollegiate basketball season

2017–18 UT Martin Skyhawks women's basketball

WNIT, First Round
- Conference: Ohio Valley Conference
- Division I
- Record: 19–15 (13–5 OVC)
- Head coach: Kevin McMillan (9th season)
- Assistant coaches: David Russell (8th season); David Hart (7th season); Jasmine Newsome (3rd season)
- Home arena: Skyhawk Arena

2017–18 Ohio Valley Conference women's basketball standings
	Conf.				Overall
Team	W		L	PCT	W		L	PCT
No. 23 Belmont †	18	–	0	1.000	31	–	4	.886
UT Martin	13	–	5	.722	19	–	15	.559
SIU Edwardsville	13	–	5	.722	17	–	15	.531
Morehead State	12	–	6	.667	21	–	11	.656
Jacksonville State	12	–	6	.667	19	–	12	.613
Austin Peay	9	–	9	.500	16	–	14	.533
Southeast Missouri State	9	–	9	.500	14	–	17	.452
Murray State	7	–	11	.389	11	–	19	.367
Eastern Kentucky	5	–	13	.278	8	–	19	.296
Tennessee Tech	4	–	14	.222	7	–	22	.241
Tennessee State	4	–	14	.222	6	–	21	.222
Eastern Illinois	2	–	16	.111	3	–	26	.103
† 2018 OVC tournament winner As of March 17, 2018; Rankings from AP poll

The 2017–18 UT Martin Skyhawks women's basketball team represent University of Tennessee at Martin during the 2017–18 NCAA Division I women's basketball season. The Skyhawks, led by ninth year head coach Kevin McMillan, play their home games at Skyhawk Arena as members of the Ohio Valley Conference. (OVC)

== Schedule and results ==
Date time, TV	Rank^{#}	Opponent^{#}	Result	Record	Site (attendance) city, state
Exhibition
11/06/2017*; 5:30 pm, OVCDN		Lindsey Wilson	W 102–91	0-0	Skyhawk Arena (5,754); Martin, TN
Non–conference regular season
11/10/2017*; 6:00 pm		at Southern Illinois	L 72–84	0–1	SIU Arena (625); Carbondale, IL
11/13/2017*; 7:00 pm, OVCDN		Alabama Huntsville	W 104–73	1–1	Skyhawk Arena (1,082); Martin, TN
11/18/2017*; 2:00 pm, OVCDN		Northwestern	L 63–71	1–2	Skyhawk Arena (1,082); Martin, TN
11/21/2017*; 7:00 pm		at Arkansas State	L 73–84	1–3	First National Bank Arena (784); Jonesboro, AR
11/26/2017*; 2:00 pm, OVCDN		Western Carolina	W 62–54	2–3	Skyhawk Arena (1,463); Martin, TN
11/30/2017*; 6:00 pm, OVCDN		North Carolina A&T	W 76-63	3–3	Skyhawk Arena (1,243); Martin, TN
12/02/2017*; 1:00 pm, ESPN3		at Chattanooga	L 82–87 ^{OT}	3–4	McKenzie Arena (3,676); Chattanooga, TN
12/05/2017*; 6:00 pm, ESPN3		at No. 4 Louisville	L 56–91	3–5	KFC Yum! Center (6,279); Louisville, KY
12/07/2017*; 11:00 am, OVCDN		Rhodes College	W 90–49	4–5	Skyhawk Arena (3,712); Martin, TN
12/17/2017*; 1:30 pm		vs. Saint Mary's; Basketball Travelers Inc. Invitational	L 58–69	4–6	Mackey Arena (6,193); West Lafayette, IN
12/20/2017*; 5:30 pm, BTN Plus		at Purdue; Basketball Travelers Inc. Invitational	L 58–60	4–7	Mackey Arena (5,387); West Lafayette, IN
12/22/2017*; 10:00 am		Eastern Washington; Basketball Travelers Inc. Invitational	L 58–61	4–8	Mackey Arena (6,510); West Lafayette, IN
Ohio Valley Conference regular season
12/28/2017; 3:00 pm, OVCDN		Tennessee State	W 80–68	5–8 (1–0)	Skyhawk Arena (1,518); Martin, TN
12/30/2017; 4:00 pm, OVCDN		Belmont	L 63–65	5–9 (1–1)	Skyhawk Arena (1,662); Martin, TN
01/03/2018; 7:00 pm, OVCDN		at Austin Peay	L 62–69	5–10 (1–2)	Dunn Center (312); Clarksville, TN
01/06/2018; 5:00 pm, OVCDN		at Murray State	W 97–80	6–10 (2–2)	CFSB Center (1,377); Murray, KY
01/11/2018; 5:30 pm, OVCDN		Eastern Kentucky	W 77–49	7–10 (3–2)	Skyhawk Arena (1,706); Martin, TN
01/13/2018; 4:00 pm, OVCDN		Morehead State	L 61–76 ^{OT}	7–11 (3–3)	Skyhawk Arena (1,003); Martin, TN
01/18/2018; 5:15 pm, OVCDN		at Eastern Illinois	W 72–44	8–11 (4–3)	Lantz Arena (397); Charleston, IL
01/20/2018; 6:00 pm, OVCDN		at SIU Edwardsville	W 73-70	8-12 (4-4)	Vadalabene Center (717); Edwardsville, IL
01/25/2018; 5:30 pm, OVCDN		at Jacksonville State	W 61-57 ^{OT}	9-12 (5-4)	Pete Mathews Coliseum (933); Jacksonville, AL
01/27/2018; 5:30 pm, OVCDN		at Tennessee Tech	W 67-51	10-12 (6-4)	Eblen Center (1,606); Cookeville, TN
02/01/2018; 5:30 pm, OVCDN		Austin Peay	W 100-66	11-12 (7-4)	Skyhawk Arena (2,518); Martin, TN
02/03/2018; 4:00 pm, OVCDN		Murray State	W 85-67	12-12 (8-4)	Skyhawk Arena (3,108); Martin, TN
02/08/2018; 4:30 pm, OVCDN		at Eastern Kentucky	W 72-54	13-12 (9-4)	McBrayer Arena (400); Richmond, KY
02/10/2018; 4:00 pm, OVCDN		Southeast Missouri State	W 72-65	14-12 (10-4)	Skyhawk Arena (2,018); Martin, TN
02/15/2018; 4:00 pm, ESPNU		SIU Edwardsville	W 72-64	15-12 (11-4)	Skyhawk Arena (1,001); Martin, TN
02/17/2018; 4:00 pm, OVCDN		Eastern Illinois	W 85-57	16-12 (12-4)	Skyhawk Arena (1,543); Martin, TN
02/22/2018; 4:15 pm, OVCDN		at Morehead State	L 75-88	16-13 (12-5)	Ellis Johnson Arena (1,128); Morehead, KY
02/24/2018; 2:00 pm, OVCDN		at Southeast Missouri State	W 69-68	17-13 (13-5)	Show Me Center (809); Cape Girardeau, MO
Ohio Valley Conference tournament
02/28/2018; 3:00 pm, ESPN3/OVCDN	(2)	vs. (7) Southeast Missouri State; Quarterfinals	W 63-60	18-13	Ford Center (587); Evansville, IN
03/02/2018; 3:00 pm, ESPN3/OVCDN	(2)	vs. (3) SIU Edwardsville; Semifinals	W 69-67	19-13	Ford Center (695); Evansville, IN
03/03/2018; 2:00 pm, ESPN3/OVCDN	(#2)	vs. (#1) Belmont; Championship Game	L 56-63 ^{OT}	19-14	Ford Center (823); Evansville, IN
Women's National Invitation Tournament
03/15/2018*; 6:00 pm, BTN Plus		at Indiana; First Round	L 50-74	19-15	Simon Skjodt Assembly Hall; Bloomington, Indiana
*Non-conference game. ^{#}Rankings from AP Poll. (#) Tournament seedings in parentheses. All times are in Central Time.
