= Bill Carr (basketball) =

American basketball coach

Current position
- Title: General manager
- Team: UC San Diego
- Conference: Big West

Playing career
- 1983–1985: Glendale CC (CA)
- 1985–1987: San Francisco

Coaching career (HC unless noted)

Men's basketball
- 1990–1999: San Francisco (assistant)
- 1999–2002: Spring Hill
- 2002–2004: Long Beach State (associate HC)
- 2004–2007: UC San Diego
- 2007–2011: San Diego (associate HC)
- 2011–2016: Point Loma Nazarene

Women's basketball
- 2016–2024: Santa Clara

Administrative career (AD unless noted)
- 2024–present: UC San Diego (GM)

Head coaching record
- Overall: 202–132 (.605) (men's); 115–118 (.494) (women's)
- Tournaments: 5–4 (NAIA)

Accomplishments and honors

Championships
- 2 GCAC regular season (2000, 2002)

Awards
- GSAC Coach of the Year (2012); GCAC Coach of the Year (2002)

Bill Carr (born c. 1965) is an American former basketball coach who recently was the head women's basketball coach at Santa Clara University. He currently serves as general manager for the University of California, San Diego men's and women's basketball programs. He was previously the head men's basketball coach at Point Loma Nazarene University, and also had head coaching stints at Spring Hill College and UC San Diego. Prior to Santa Clara, Carr had spent the entirety of his career coaching men's basketball.

== Head coaching record ==
=== Men's ===
Statistics overview
Season	Team	Overall	Conference	Standing	Postseason
Spring Hill Badgers (Gulf Coast Athletic Conference) (1999–2002)
1999–2000	Spring Hill	29–8	16–2	1st	NAIA Division I Elite Eight
2000–01	Spring Hill	29–8	12–4	T–3rd	NAIA Division I Elite Eight
2001–02	Spring Hill	26–7	13–3	1st	NAIA Division I First Round
Spring Hill:		84–23 (.785)	41–9 (.820)		
UC San Diego Tritons (California Collegiate Athletic Association) (2004–2007)
2004–05	UC San Diego	11–16	7–13	8th	
2005–06	UC San Diego	15–14	12–8	T–4th	
2006–07	UC San Diego	11–16	7–13	8th	
UC San Diego:		38–45 (.458)	29–33 (.468)		
Point Loma Nazarene Sea Lions (Golden State Athletic Conference) (2011–2012)
2011–12	Point Loma Nazarene	21–10	12–6	T–2nd	NAIA Division I Second Round
Point Loma Nazarene Sea Lions (Pacific West Conference) (2012–2016)
2012–13	Point Loma Nazarene	5–21	2–16	T–13th	
2013–14	Point Loma Nazarene	20–11	10–10	7th	
2014–15	Point Loma Nazarene	21–8	13–7	5th	
2015–16	Point Loma Nazarene	13–14	8–12	11th	
Point Loma Nazarene:		80–64 (.556)	45–51 (.469)		
Total:		202–132 (.605)			
National champion Postseason invitational champion Conference regular season champion Conference regular season and conference tournament champion Division regular season champion Division regular season and conference tournament champion Conference tournament champion

=== Women's ===
- Santa Clara
- WCC

Statistics overview
Season	Team	Overall	Conference	Standing	Postseason
Santa Clara Broncos (West Coast Conference) (2016–2024)
2016–17	Santa Clara	14–16	9–9	T–5th	
2017–18	Santa Clara	9–21	5–13	T–8th	
2018–19	Santa Clara	14–17	6–12	7th	
2019–20	Santa Clara	12–13	5–9	8th	
2020–21	Santa Clara	14–11	9–8	T–5th	
2021–22	Santa Clara	15–14	8–10	7th	
2022–23	Santa Clara	15–17	6–12	T–7th	
2023–24	Santa Clara	25–9	12–4	2nd	WBIT Second Round
Santa Clara:		115–118 (.494)	60–77 (.438)		
Total:		115–118 (.494)			
National champion Postseason invitational champion Conference regular season champion Conference regular season and conference tournament champion Division regular season champion Division regular season and conference tournament champion Conference tournament champion
