= 2017–18 San Diego Toreros women's basketball team =

Intercollegiate basketball season

2017–18 San Diego Toreros women's basketball
- Conference: West Coast Conference
- Record: 17–15 (8–10 WCC)
- Head coach: Cindy Fisher (13th season)
- Assistant coaches: Mary Ann Falcosky; Mery Andrade; Trevor Olson
- Home arena: Jenny Craig Pavilion

2017–18 West Coast Conference women's basketball standings
	Conf.				Overall
Team	W		L	PCT	W		L	PCT
Gonzaga †	17	–	1	.944	27	–	6	.818
Saint Mary's	13	–	5	.722	20	–	11	.645
Loyola Marymount	11	–	7	.611	19	–	11	.633
BYU	11	–	7	.611	16	–	14	.533
San Francisco	10	–	8	.556	16	–	15	.516
San Diego	8	–	10	.444	17	–	15	.531
Pacific	7	–	11	.389	15	–	17	.469
Pepperdine	5	–	13	.278	10	–	21	.323
Santa Clara	5	–	13	.278	9	–	21	.300
Portland	3	–	15	.167	7	–	23	.233
† 2018 WCC tournament winner As of 17 March 2018; Rankings from AP poll

The 2017–18 San Diego Toreros women's basketball team represented the University of San Diego in the 2017–18 NCAA Division I women's basketball season. The Toreros, as members of the West Coast Conference (WCC), were led by 13th-year head coach Cindy Fisher. The Toreros played their home games at the Jenny Craig Pavilion on the university campus in San Diego, California. They finished the season 17–15, 8–10 in WCC play, to finish in sixth place. They advanced to the championship game of the WCC women's tournament, where they lost to Gonzaga.

== Previous season ==
The Toreros finished the 2016–17 season 14–16, 7–11 in WCC play, to finish in seventh place. They advanced to the quarterfinals of the WCC women's tournament where they lost to BYU.

== Roster ==
2017–18 San Diego Toreros women's basketball team
Players
Coaches

Pos.	#	Name	Height	Year	Previous school	Hometown
G	4	Ana Ramos	5 ft 10 in (1.78 m)	So	Escola Basica e Secundaria Amelia Rey Colaco	Porto, Portugal
G	5	Aubrey Ward-El	5 ft 9 in (1.75 m)	Sr	Skyview	Vancouver, WA
G	10	Myah Pace	5 ft 11 in (1.8 m)	Fr	Bishop O'Dowd	Oakland, CA
G	11	Madison Pollock	6 ft 1 in (1.85 m)	So	Archbishop Murphy	Snohomish, WA
F	12	Alexandra Hagan	6 ft 0 in (1.83 m)	Jr	Inglemoor	Kenmore, WA
G	21	Sydney Shepard	5 ft 11 in (1.8 m)	Jr	Lake Washington	Kirkland, WA
F	22	Maya Hood	5 ft 10 in (1.78 m)	GS	La Jolla Country Day	San Diego, CA
F	24	Caroline Buhr	6 ft 1 in (1.85 m)	RS Jr	Penn	Mishawaka, IN
F	30	Kendall Bird	6 ft 2 in (1.88 m)	Fr	White River	Buckley, WA
G	32	Sydney Hunter	6 ft 0 in (1.83 m)	Fr	McNary	Keizer, OR
C	33	Kat Olczak	6 ft 7 in (2.01 m)	So	Zespol Szkol Mistrzostwa Sportowego	Zielona Góra, Poland
F	34	Patricia Brossman	6 ft 0 in (1.83 m)	So	TuS Lichterfelde	Berlin, Germany
G	40	Jamie Kissinger	5 ft 9 in (1.75 m)	Sr	Minden	Minden, NE
F	44	Sydney Williams	6 ft 1 in (1.85 m)	Sr	Coeur d'Alene	Coeur d'Alene, ID
F	55	Alexandria Young	6 ft 0 in (1.83 m)	RS Sr	Mater Dei	San Diego, CA

Head coach

- Cindy Fisher (Eastern Wyoming College)

Assistant coach(es)

- Mary Ann Falcosky (Northern Arizona)
- Mery Andrade (Old Dominion)
- Trevor Olson (San Diego)

Legend

- (C) Team captain
- (S) Suspended
- (I) Ineligible
- (W) Walk-on
- Injured
- Current redshirt

Roster

== Schedule ==
Date time, TV	Rank^{#}	Opponent^{#}	Result	Record	Site (attendance) city, state
Exhibition
November 7, 2017*; 6:00 p.m.		Biola	W 79–58		Jenny Craig Pavilion; San Diego, CA
Non-conference regular season
November 10, 2017*; 6:00 p.m.		San Diego Christian	W 82–53	1–0	Jenny Craig Pavilion (335); San Diego, CA
November 14, 2017*; 6:00 p.m.		Southern Utah	W 72–59	2–0	Jenny Craig Pavilion (202); San Diego, CA
November 17, 2017*; 6:30 p.m.		vs. Boise State; Bank of Hawaii Classic	W 72–52	3–0	Stan Sheriff Center (1,710); Honolulu, HI
November 17, 2017*; 7:00 p.m.		at Hawaii; Bank of Hawaii Classic	L 63–64 ^{OT}	3–1	Stan Sheriff Center (1,756); Honolulu, HI
November 22, 2017*; 6:00 p.m.		Long Beach State	W 74–40	4–1	Jenny Craig Pavilion (301); San Diego, CA
November 27, 2017*; 7:00 p.m.		at UC Santa Barbara	W 71–58	5–1	The Thunderdome (268); Santa Barbara, CA
November 29, 2017*; 6:30 p.m.		at San Diego State	L 76–77	5–2	Viejas Arena (790); San Diego, CA
December 2, 2017*; 2:00 p.m.		at Seattle	L 73–80	5–3	Connolly Center (422); Seattle, WA
December 7, 2017*; 7:00 p.m.		at No. 25 California	L 64–89	5–4	Haas Pavilion (1,126); Berkeley, CA
December 10, 2017*; 12:30 p.m.		Minnesota	W 72–69	6–4	Jenny Craig Pavilion (511); San Diego, CA
December 16, 2017*; 5:00 p.m.		UTSA	W 78–69	7–4	Jenny Craig Pavilion (442); San Diego, CA
WCC regular season
December 28, 2017; 7:00 p.m.		at San Francisco	W 60–54	8–4 (1–0)	War Memorial Gymnasium; San Francisco, CA
December 30, 2017; 1:00 p.m.		at Pepperdine	L 62–66	8–5 (1–1)	Firestone Fieldhouse (267); Malibu, CA
January 4, 2018; 6:00 p.m.		Portland	W 59–52	9–5 (2–1)	Jenny Craig Pavilion (304); San Diego, CA
January 6, 2018; 2:00 p.m.		Saint Mary's	L 53–75	9–6 (2–2)	Jenny Craig Pavilion (346); San Diego, CA
January 11, 2018; 6:00 p.m.		Pacific	L 68–81	9–7 (2–3)	Jenny Craig Pavilion (271); San Diego, CA
January 13, 2018; 2:00 p.m.		at Loyola Marymount	W 60–54	10–7 (3–3)	Gersten Pavilion (281); Los Angeles, CA
January 18, 2018; 7:00 p.m.		at Portland	W 75–60	11–7 (4–3)	Chiles Center (354); Portland, OR
January 20, 2018; 2:00 p.m.		BYU	W 70–69	12–7 (5–3)	Jenny Craig Pavilion (281); San Diego, CA
January 25, 2018; 7:00 p.m.		at Santa Clara	L 50–59	12–8 (5–4)	Leavey Center (256); Santa Clara, CA
January 27, 2018; 2:00 p.m.		Loyola Marymount	L 53–67	12–9 (5–5)	Jenny Craig Pavilion (373); San Diego, CA
February 1, 2018; 6:00 p.m.		Gonzaga	L 44–63	12–10 (5–6)	Jenny Craig Pavilion (675); San Diego, CA
February 3, 2018; 2:00 p.m.		at Saint Mary's	L 57–66	12–11 (5–7)	McKeon Pavilion (234); Moraga, CA
February 8, 2018; 6:00 p.m.		Pepperdine	W 79–53	13–11 (6–7)	Jenny Craig Pavilion (376); San Diego, CA
February 10, 2018; 2:00 p.m.		Santa Clara	W 51–40	14–11 (7–7)	Jenny Craig Pavilion (354); San Diego, CA
February 15, 2018; 7:00 p.m.		at Pacific	L 60–62	14–12 (7–8)	Alex G. Spanos Center (639); Stockton, CA
February 17, 2018; 1:00 p.m., BYUtv		at BYU	W 66–60	15–12 (8–8)	Marriott Center (961); Provo, UT
February 22, 2018; 6:00 p.m.		at Gonzaga	L 54–58	15–13 (8–9)	McCarthey Athletic Center (5,712); Spokane, WA
February 24, 2018; 2:00 p.m.		San Francisco	L 47–49	15–14 (8–10)	Jenny Craig Pavilion (688); San Diego, CA
WCC women's tournament
March 1, 2018; 6:00 p.m., BYUtv	(6)	vs. (3) BYU; Quarterfinals	W 61–56	16–14	Orleans Arena; Paradise, NV
March 5, 2018; 2:00 p.m., BYUtv	(6)	vs. (7) Pacific; Semifinals	W 66–56	17–14	Orleans Arena (6,832); Paradise, NV
March 6, 2018; 1:00 p.m., ESPNU	(6)	vs. (1) Gonzaga; Championship game	L 71–79	17–15	Orleans Arena (6,661); Paradise, NV
*Non-conference game. ^{#}Rankings from AP poll. (#) Tournament seedings in parentheses. All times are in Pacific.

== Rankings ==
Regular-season polls
Poll	Pre- season	Week 2	Week 3	Week 4	Week 5	Week 6	Week 7	Week 8	Week 9	Week 10	Week 11	Week 12	Week 13	Week 14	Week 15	Week 16	Week 17	Week 18	Week 19	Final
AP																				N/A
Coaches																				

Legend
	Increase in ranking
	Decrease in ranking
	No change
(RV)	Received votes
(NR)	Not ranked
