= 2017–18 Belmont Bruins women's basketball team =

Intercollegiate basketball season

2017–18 Belmont Bruins women's basketball

OVC regular-season and tournament champions

NCAA women's tournament, first round
- Conference: Ohio Valley Conference

Ranking
- AP: No. 23
- Record: 31–4 (18–0 OVC)
- Head coach: Bart Brooks (1st season)
- Assistant coaches: Jamey Givens; Amy Malo; Karmen Graham
- Home arena: Curb Event Center

2017–18 Ohio Valley Conference women's basketball standings
	Conf.				Overall
Team	W		L	PCT	W		L	PCT
No. 23 Belmont †	18	–	0	1.000	31	–	4	.886
UT Martin	13	–	5	.722	19	–	15	.559
SIU Edwardsville	13	–	5	.722	17	–	15	.531
Morehead State	12	–	6	.667	21	–	11	.656
Jacksonville State	12	–	6	.667	19	–	12	.613
Austin Peay	9	–	9	.500	16	–	14	.533
Southeast Missouri State	9	–	9	.500	14	–	17	.452
Murray State	7	–	11	.389	11	–	19	.367
Eastern Kentucky	5	–	13	.278	8	–	19	.296
Tennessee Tech	4	–	14	.222	7	–	22	.241
Tennessee State	4	–	14	.222	6	–	21	.222
Eastern Illinois	2	–	16	.111	3	–	26	.103
† 2018 OVC tournament winner As of March 17, 2018; Rankings from AP poll

The 2017–18 Belmont Bruins women's basketball team represented Belmont University during the 2017–18 NCAA Division I women's basketball season. The Bruins, led by first-year head coach Bart Brooks, played their home games at the Curb Event Center in Nashville, Tennessee as members of the Ohio Valley Conference (OVC). They finished the season 31–4, 18–0 in OVC play, to win the OVC regular season. They won the OVC women's tournament by defeating UT Martin, and earned an automatic trip to the NCAA women's tournament, where they lost to Duke in the first round. They finished with 31 wins, the most in school history.

== Roster ==
2017–18 Belmont Bruins women's basketball team
Players
Coaches

Pos.	#	Name	Height	Year	Previous school	Hometown
F	10	Allison Luly (redshirt)	6 ft 1 in (1.85 m)	Fr	Creekview	Alpharetta, GA
G	11	Caitlyn Yost	5 ft 8 in (1.73 m)	Fr	Forrest	Lewisburg, TN
G	12	Sierra Jones	5 ft 9 in (1.75 m)	Sr	Madison Academy	Huntsville, AL
F	20	Conley Chinn (redshirt)	6 ft 1 in (1.85 m)	Fr	Jackson Academy	Jackson, MS
G	21	Paris Lawson	5 ft 9 in (1.75 m)	So	Oakland	Murfreesboro, TN
G	22	Maddie Cook (redshirt)	5 ft 10 in (1.78 m)	Fr	Oakland	Murfreesboro, TN
G	23	Kylee Smith	5 ft 11 in (1.8 m)	RS Sr	Alpharetta; Vanderbilt	Alpharetta, GA
G	24	Jenny Roy	5 ft 11 in (1.8 m)	Jr	Brentwood	Brentwood, TN
G	25	Grace Smith (redshirt)	5 ft 9 in (1.75 m)	Fr	Cary Christian School	Raleigh, NC
F	30	Ellie Harmeyer	6 ft 0 in (1.83 m)	RS So	Shoreland Lutheran	Kenosha, WI
G	31	Maura Muensterman	6 ft 0 in (1.83 m)	RS So	Mater Dei; Indiana	Evansville, IN
G	33	Darby Maggard	5 ft 5 in (1.65 m)	Jr	Fort Wayne Canterbury	Larwill, IN
G	34	Hannah Harmeyer	5 ft 8 in (1.73 m)	RS Jr	Shoreland Lutheran; Wisconsin Lutheran	Kenosha, WI
C	50	Sally McCabe	6 ft 3 in (1.91 m)	Sr	Mt. Juliet	Mount Juliet, TN
F	55	Maddie Wright	6 ft 1 in (1.85 m)	So	Boyd-Buchanan	Chattanooga, TN

Head coach

- Bart Brooks (Wyoming)

Assistant coach(es)

- Jamey Givens (Florida State)
- Amy Malo (Vanderbilt)
- Karmen Graham (Northern Kentucky)

Legend

- (C) Team captain
- (S) Suspended
- (I) Ineligible
- (W) Walk-on
- Injured
- Current redshirt

Roster
Last update: July 20, 2024

== Schedule and results ==
Date time, TV	Rank^{#}	Opponent^{#}	Result	Record	Site (attendance) city, state
Non–conference regular season
November 10, 2017*; 7:00 p.m.		at No. 22 Oklahoma	L 73–96	0–1	Lloyd Noble Center (3,306); Norman, OK
November 12, 2017*; 2:00 p.m.		at Tulsa	W 90–65	1–1	Reynolds Center (274); Tulsa, OK
November 15, 2017*; 6:00 p.m.		Fort Wayne	W 74–42	2–1	Curb Event Center (496); Nashville, TN
November 21, 2017*; 6:00 p.m.		Samford	W 83–46	3–1	Curb Event Center (641); Nashville, TN
November 23, 2017*; 10:00 p.m.		vs. Gonzaga; Play4Kay Shootout quarterfinals	W 71–63	4–1	Mandalay Bay Arena (323); Paradise, NV
November 24, 2017*; 10:00 p.m.		vs. No. 14 Stanford; Play4Kay Shootout semifinals	L 53–74	4–2	Mandalay Bay Arena (1,221); Paradise, NV
November 25, 2017*; 7:30 p.m.		vs. Florida Gulf Coast; Play4Kay Shootout 3rd-place game	W 75–65	5–2	Mandalay Bay Arena; Paradise, NV
November 28, 2017*; 6:00 p.m.		Trevecca Nazarene	W 97–39	6–2	Curb Event Center (253); Nashville, TN
December 1, 2017*; 11:00 a.m.		Presbyterian	W 90–48	7–2	Curb Event Center (1,371); Nashville, TN
December 1, 2017*; 5:00 p.m., ESPN3		at Lipscomb; Battle of the Boulevard	W 91–59	8–2	Allen Arena (475); Nashville, TN
December 14, 2017*; 11:30 a.m.		at Arkansas State	W 83–52	9–2	First National Bank Arena (4,374); Jonesboro, TN
December 18, 2017*; 6:00 p.m.		Wright State	L 81–91	9–3	Curb Event Center (731); Nashville, TN
December 21, 2017*; 12:00 p.m.		at Vanderbilt	W 111–74	10–3	Memorial Gymnasium; Nashville, TN
Ohio Valley Conference regular season
December 28, 2017; 5:15 p.m.		at Southeast Missouri State	W 67–57	11–3 (1–0)	Show Me Center (675); Cape Girardeau, MO
December 30, 2017; 4:00 p.m.		at UT Martin	W 65–63	12–3 (2–0)	Skyhawk Arena (1,662); Martin, TN
January 4, 2018; 5:00 p.m.		Tennessee Tech	W 78–59	13–3 (3–0)	Curb Event Center (1,024); Nashville, TN
January 6, 2018; 3:00 p.m.		Jacksonville State	W 71–55	14–3 (4–0)	Curb Event Center (1,064); Nashville, TN
January 10, 2018; 7:00 p.m.		at SIU Edwardsville	W 72–55	15–3 (5–0)	Vadalabene Center (904); Edwardsville, IL
January 13, 2018; 1:00 p.m.		at Eastern Illinois	W 86–58	16–3 (6–0)	Lantz Arena (422); Charleston, IL
January 17, 2018; 6:00 p.m.		Murray State	W 70–65	17–3 (7–0)	Curb Event Center (632); Nashville, TN
January 20, 2018; 3:00 p.m.		Austin Peay	W 78–75	18–3 (8–0)	Curb Event Center (1,473); Nashville, TN
January 25, 2018; 5:00 p.m.		Eastern Illinois	W 59–37	19–3 (9–0)	Curb Event Center (1,021); Nashville, TN
January 27, 2018; 3:00 p.m.		SIU Edwardsville	W 86–64	20–3 (10–0)	Curb Event Center (1,412); Nashville, TN
February 1, 2018; 4:30 p.m.		at Eastern Kentucky	W 77–55	21–3 (11–0)	McBrayer Arena (600); Richmond, KY
February 3, 2018; 5:15 p.m.		at Morehead State	W 83–62	22–3 (12–0)	Ellis Johnson Arena (1,688); Morehead, KY
February 8, 2018; 5:30 p.m.		at Tennessee State	W 87–70	23–3 (13–0)	Gentry Center (1,539); Nashville, TN
February 10, 2018; 5:30 p.m.		at Tennessee Tech	W 68–60	24–3 (14–0)	Eblen Center (2,899); Cookeville, TN
February 15, 2018; 5:00 p.m.	No. 24	Eastern Kentucky	W 95–62	25–3 (15–0)	Curb Event Center (1,854); Nashville, TN
February 17, 2018; 5:15 p.m.	No. 24	Morehead State	W 80–56	26–3 (16–0)	Curb Event Center (600); Nashville, TN
February 21, 2018; 6:00 p.m.	No. 23	at Jacksonville State	W 66–35	27–3 (17–0)	Pete Mathews Coliseum (1,064); Jacksonville, AL
February 24, 2018; 3:00 p.m.	No. 23	Tennessee State	W 84–42	28–3 (18–0)	Curb Event Center (2,278); Nashville, TN
Ohio Valley Conference tournament
February 28, 2018; 1:00 p.m., OVCDN/ESPN3	(1) No. 22	vs. (8) Murray State; Quarterfinals	W 88–64	29–3	Ford Center; Evansville, IN
March 2, 2018; 1:00 p.m., OVCDN/ESPN3	(1) No. 22	vs. (4) Jacksonville State; Semifinals	W 63–53	30–3	Ford Center; Evansville, IN
March 3, 2018; 2:00 p.m., OVCDN/ESPN3	(1) No. 22	vs. (2) UT Martin; Championship game	W 63–56 ^{OT}	31–3	Ford Center (823); Evansville, IN
NCAA women's tournament
March 17, 2018*; 11:00 a.m., ESPN2	(12 A) No. 23	vs. (5 A) No. 20 Duke; First round	L 58–72	31–4	Stegeman Coliseum; Athens, GA
*Non-conference game. ^{#}Rankings from AP poll. (#) Tournament seedings in parentheses. A=Albany Region. All times are in Central.

== Rankings ==
Regular-season polls
Poll	Pre- season	Week 2	Week 3	Week 4	Week 5	Week 6	Week 7	Week 8	Week 9	Week 10	Week 11	Week 12	Week 13	Week 14	Week 15	Week 16	Week 17	Week 18	Week 19	Final
AP										RV		RV	RV	RV	24	23	22	23	23	N/A
Coaches		N/A													RV	RV	RV	25	25	RV

Legend
	Increase in ranking
	Decrease in ranking
	No change
(RV)	Received votes
(NR)	Not ranked

== See also ==
- 2017–18 Belmont Bruins men's basketball team
