= 2017–18 Pacific Tigers women's basketball team =

Intercollegiate basketball season

2017–18 Pacific Tigers women's basketball
- Conference: West Coast Conference
- Record: 15–17 (7–11 WCC)
- Head coach: Bradley Davis (3rd season)
- Assistant coaches: Amy Starr; Alexis Thomas; Amanda Brown
- Home arena: Alex G. Spanos Center

2017–18 West Coast Conference women's basketball standings
	Conf.				Overall
Team	W		L	PCT	W		L	PCT
Gonzaga †	17	–	1	.944	27	–	6	.818
Saint Mary's	13	–	5	.722	20	–	11	.645
Loyola Marymount	11	–	7	.611	19	–	11	.633
BYU	11	–	7	.611	16	–	14	.533
San Francisco	10	–	8	.556	16	–	15	.516
San Diego	8	–	10	.444	17	–	15	.531
Pacific	7	–	11	.389	15	–	17	.469
Pepperdine	5	–	13	.278	10	–	21	.323
Santa Clara	5	–	13	.278	9	–	21	.300
Portland	3	–	15	.167	7	–	23	.233
† 2018 WCC tournament winner As of 17 March 2018; Rankings from AP poll

The 2017–18 Pacific Tigers women's basketball team represented the University of the Pacific during the 2017–18 NCAA Division I women's basketball season. The Tigers were led by third year head coach Bradley Davis. They played their home games at Alex G. Spanos Center and were members of the West Coast Conference. They finished the season 15–17, 7–11 in WCC play to finish in seventh place. They advanced to the semifinals of the WCC women's tournament, where they lost to San Diego.

== Previous season ==
They finished the season 10–21, 5–13 in WCC play to finish in a tie for eighth place. They advanced to the quarterfinals of the WCC women's tournament where they lost to Gonzaga.

== Roster ==
2017–18 Pacific Tigers women's basketball team
Players
Coaches

Pos.	#	Name	Height	Year	Previous school	Hometown
G	0	Chelsea Lidy	5 ft 9 in (1.75 m)	Jr	Bishop Montgomery	Torrance, CA
F	1	Anaya Brooklyn McDavid	6 ft 1 in (1.85 m)	Fr	Bishop Alemany	Studio City, CA
G/F	2	Jenelle Grant	6 ft 0 in (1.83 m)	So	Harris Westminster	London, England
G	3	Isabel Newman	6 ft 0 in (1.83 m)	Fr	Chaminade College Prep	Simi Valley, CA
G	4	Tylah King	6 ft 0 in (1.83 m)	Jr	Brisbane State	Queensland, Australia
F	10	Savannah Sumsion	6 ft 2 in (1.88 m)	Fr	Springville	Springville, UT
C	12	Sydney Fadal	6 ft 1 in (1.85 m)	RS Fr	St. Mary's	Stockton, CA
G	14	Jessica Blakeslee	5 ft 10 in (1.78 m)	So	Mercer Island	Mercer Island, WA
G	15	GeAnna Luaulu-Summers	5 ft 9 in (1.75 m)	Sr	Sacred Heart Cathedral	San Francisco, CA
G	21	Ameela Li	5 ft 6 in (1.68 m)	Jr	Piedmont	Piedmont, CA
G/F	22	Desire Finnie	5 ft 11 in (1.8 m)	Sr	Berkeley	Berkeley, CA
G	23	Lianna Tillman	5 ft 9 in (1.75 m)	Fr	Lincoln	Stockton, CA
F	33	Issy Parker	6 ft 2 in (1.88 m)	Fr	Brisbane State	Brisbane, Australia
G		Valerie Higgins (redshirt)	6 ft 0 in (1.83 m)	So	Chaminade College Prep; USC	Granada Hills, CA

Head coach

- Bradley Davis (California)

Assistant coach(es)

- Amy Starr (Washington State)
- Alexis Thomas (UC San Diego)
- Amanda Brown (Gonzaga)

Legend

- (C) Team captain
- (S) Suspended
- (I) Ineligible
- (W) Walk-on
- Injured
- Current redshirt

Roster
Last update: January 13, 2018

== Schedule ==
Date time, TV	Rank^{#}	Opponent^{#}	Result	Record	Site (attendance) city, state
Exhibition
11/01/2017*; 8:30 pm		William Jessup	W 95–59		Alex G. Spanos Center (313); Stockton, CA
Non-conference regular season
11/13/2017*; 9:00 pm		Cal State Fullerton	W 81–65	1–0	Alex G. Spanos Center (391); Stockton, CA
11/15/2017*; 5:00 pm		UC Merced	W 123–59	2–0	Alex G. Spanos Center (2,506); Stockton, CA
11/20/2017*; 7:00 pm		UC Davis	L 58–90	2–1	Alex G. Spanos Center (500); Stockton, CA
11/24/2017*; 3:30 pm		San Jose State; Turkey Tip-Off	W 106–97	3–1	Alex G. Spanos Center (431); Stockton, CA
11/25/2017*; 5:00 pm		Brown; Turkey Tip-Off	L 57–74	3–2	Alex G. Spanos Center (440); Stockton, CA
11/30/2017*; 7:00 pm		Lamar	W 80–75	4–2	Alex G. Spanos Center (321); Stockton, CA
12/03/2017*; 1:00 pm		at Northern Colorado	L 55–80	4–3	Bank of Colorado Arena; Greeley, CO
12/07/2017*; 7:00 pm		at Fresno State	L 70–81	4–4	Save Mart Center (1,978); Fresno, CA
12/10/2017*; 2:00 pm		No. 25 California	L 85–92	4–5	Alex G. Spanos Center (479); Stockton, CA
12/17/2017*; 2:00 pm		at Seattle	W 85–73	5–5	Connolly Center (321); Seattle, WA
12/20/2017*; 5:00 pm		UCF	W 78–74 ^{OT}	6–5	Alex G. Spanos Center (238); Stockton, CA
WCC regular season
12/28/2017; 7:00 pm		Gonzaga	L 72–99	6–6 (0–1)	Alex G. Spanos Center (716); Stockton, CA
12/30/2017; 2:00 pm		at Loyola Marymount	L 60–75	6–7 (0–2)	Gersten Pavilion (220); Los Angeles, CA
01/04/2018; 7:00 pm		Saint Mary's	L 69–70	6–8 (0–3)	Alex G. Spanos Center (290); Stockton, CA
01/06/2018; 1:00 pm, BYUtv		at BYU	L 65–77	6–9 (0–4)	Marriott Center (970); Provo, UT
01/11/2018; 6:00 pm		at San Diego	W 81–68	7–9 (1–4)	Jenny Craig Pavilion (271); San Diego, CA
01/13/2018; 2:00 pm		Portland	W 91–55	8–9 (2–4)	Alex G. Spanos Center (360); Stockton, CA
01/18/2018; 7:00 pm		at Pepperdine	W 85–77	9–9 (3–4)	Firestone Fieldhouse (172); Malibu, CA
01/20/2018; 2:00 pm		at Saint Mary's	L 88–96	9–10 (3–5)	McKeon Pavilion (428); Moraga, CA
01/25/2018; 11:00 am		San Francisco	L 71–81	9–11 (3–6)	Alex G. Spanos Center (3,725); Stockton, CA
01/27/2018; 2:00 pm		BYU	W 83–76	10–11 (4–6)	Alex G. Spanos Center (497); Stockton, CA
02/01/2018; 7:00 pm		Santa Clara	W 55–37	11–11 (5–6)	Alex G. Spanos Center (335); Stockton, CA
02/03/2018; 2:00 pm		Pepperdine	W 84–73	12–11 (6–6)	Alex G. Spanos Center (606); Stockton, CA
02/08/2018; 6:00 pm		at Gonzaga	L 66–90	12–12 (6–7)	McCarthey Athletic Center (5,384); Spokane, WA
02/10/2018; 2:00 pm		at Portland	L 67–89	12–13 (6–8)	Chiles Center (342); Portland, OR
02/15/2018; 7:00 pm		San Diego	W 62–60	13–13 (7–8)	Alex G. Spanos Center (639); Stockton, CA
02/17/2018; 2:00 pm		at Santa Clara	L 55–57	13–14 (7–9)	Leavey Center (1,075); Santa Clara, CA
02/22/2018; 7:00 pm		at San Francisco	L 78–80	13–15 (7–10)	War Memorial Gymnasium (473); San Francisco, CA
02/24/2018; 2:00 pm		Loyola Marymount	L 77–79	13–16 (7–11)	Alex G. Spanos Center (609); Stockton, CA
WCC Women's Tournament
03/01/2018; 2:00 pm, BYUtv	(7)	vs. (10) Portland; First Round	W 85–60	14–16	Orleans Arena (6,685); Paradise, NV
03/02/2018; 2:00 pm, BYUtv	(7)	vs. (2) Saint Mary's; Quarterfinals	W 77–73	15–16	Orleans Arena (6,813); Paradise, NV
03/05/2018; 2:00 pm, BYUtv	(7)	vs. (6) San Diego; Semifinals	L 56–66	15–17	Orleans Arena (6,832); Paradise, NV
*Non-conference game. ^{#}Rankings from AP Poll. (#) Tournament seedings in parentheses. All times are in Pacific Time.

== Rankings ==
2017–18 NCAA Division I women's basketball rankings

+ Regular season polls	Poll	Pre- Season	Week 2	Week 3	Week 4	Week 5	Week 6	Week 7	Week 8	Week 9	Week 10	Week 11	Week 12	Week 13	Week 14	Week 15	Week 16	Week 17	Week 18	Week 19	Final
AP																				N/A	
Coaches																					

Legend
	Increase in ranking
	Decrease in ranking
	No change
(RV)	Received votes
(NR)	Not ranked

== See also ==
- 2017–18 Pacific Tigers men's basketball team
