= 2017–18 Portland Pilots women's basketball team =

Intercollegiate basketball season

2017–18 Portland Pilots women's basketball
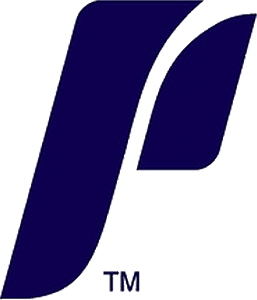
- Conference: West Coast Conference
- Record: 7–23 (3–15 WCC)
- Head coach: Cheryl Sorenson (4th season)
- Assistant coaches: Steve Lowe; Brianna Chambers; Drew Muscatell
- Home arena: Chiles Center

2017–18 West Coast Conference women's basketball standings
	Conf.				Overall
Team	W		L	PCT	W		L	PCT
Gonzaga †	17	–	1	.944	27	–	6	.818
Saint Mary's	13	–	5	.722	20	–	11	.645
Loyola Marymount	11	–	7	.611	19	–	11	.633
BYU	11	–	7	.611	16	–	14	.533
San Francisco	10	–	8	.556	16	–	15	.516
San Diego	8	–	10	.444	17	–	15	.531
Pacific	7	–	11	.389	15	–	17	.469
Pepperdine	5	–	13	.278	10	–	21	.323
Santa Clara	5	–	13	.278	9	–	21	.300
Portland	3	–	15	.167	7	–	23	.233
† 2018 WCC tournament winner As of 17 March 2018; Rankings from AP poll

The 2017–18 Portland Pilots women's basketball team represented the University of Portland in the 2017–18 NCAA Division I women's basketball season. The Pilots were led by fourth year coach Cheryl Sorensen. They played their homes games at Chiles Center and were members of the West Coast Conference. They finished the season 7–23, 3–15 in WCC play to finish in last place. They lost in the first round of the WCC women's tournament to Pacific.

== Previous season ==
They finished the season 6–24, 4–14 in WCC play to finish in last place. They lost in the first round of the WCC women's tournament to Pacific.

== Roster ==
2017–18 Portland Pilots women's basketball team
Players
Coaches

Pos.	#	Name	Height	Year	Previous school	Hometown
G	1	Kate Anderson	5 ft 9 in (1.75 m)	So	Jesuit HS	Portland, OR
G	3	Josie Matz	5 ft 10 in (1.78 m)	Fr	Wilson HS	Tacoma, WA
F	11	Lisa-Marie Kaempf	6 ft 2 in (1.88 m)	Jr	Friedrich-Dessauer-Gymnasium; Midland College	Aschaffenburg, Germany
F	14	Jayce Gorzeman	6 ft 0 in (1.83 m)	Fr	Mayfield HS	Las Cruces, NM
G	15	Maddie Muhlheim	5 ft 7 in (1.7 m)	Fr	Sunset HS	Portland, OR
F	20	Erika Kankfelt	6 ft 0 in (1.83 m)	Fr	Makelanrinne Sports	Espoo, Finland
F	22	Kristina Wooldridge	6 ft 2 in (1.88 m)	Fr	Bishop O'Dowd HS	San Leandro, CA
F	23	Julie Spencer	6 ft 2 in (1.88 m)	Jr	W.F. West HS	Chehalis, WA
G	24	Rachelle Owens	5 ft 7 in (1.7 m)	RS Sr	Carson HS; College of Southern Idaho	Carson, CA
F	30	Keala Quinlan	6 ft 0 in (1.83 m)	So	Roosevelt HS	Papakolea, HI
G	32	Darian Slaga	5 ft 8 in (1.73 m)	Jr	Boulder Creek HS	Prescott Valley, AZ
F	33	Ashley Gray	6 ft 1 in (1.85 m)	Sr	West Valley HS	Yakima, WA
C	35	Sara Zaragoza	6 ft 4 in (1.93 m)	Sr	Instituto Veritas	Madrid, Spain
C	44	Lauren Walker	6 ft 5 in (1.96 m)	Fr	Cardinal Newman HS	Windsor, CA

Head coach

- Cheryl Sorenson (Washington)

Assistant coach(es)

- Steve Lowe (Central Washington)
- Brianna Chambers (Cal State Bakersfield)
- Drew Muscatell (Oregon)

Legend

- (C) Team captain
- (S) Suspended
- (I) Ineligible
- (W) Walk-on
- Injured
- Current redshirt

Roster

== Schedule and results ==
Date time, TV	Rank^{#}	Opponent^{#}	Result	Record	Site (attendance) city, state
Exhibition
11/04/2017*; 7:30 pm		Western Oregon	W 73–72		Chiles Center (420); Portland, OR
Non-conference regular season
11/10/2017*; 7:00 pm		Hawaii	W 76–47	1–0	Chiles Center (456); Portland, OR
11/12/2017*; 7:00 pm		Willamette	W 72–52	2–0	Chiles Center (334); Portland, OR
11/14/2017*; 5:00 pm		Utah Valley	W 71–64 ^{OT}	3–0	Chiles Center (301); Portland, OR
11/17/2017*; 7:00 pm		at UC Irvine	L 52–63	3–1	Bren Events Center (386); Irvine, CA
11/25/2017*; 2:00 pm		at Cal State Fullerton	L 61–66	3–2	Titan Gym (192); Irvine, CA
11/28/2017*; 7:00 pm		Portland State	L 71–77	3–3	Chiles Center (169); Portland, OR
12/03/2017*; 1:30 pm, P12N		at Washington	L 67–93	3–4	Alaska Airlines Arena (1,410); Seattle, WA
12/08/2017*; 7:00 pm		Warner Pacific	W 95–59	4–4	Chiles Center (361); Portland, OR
12/10/2017*; 2:00 pm		Boise State	L 47–73	4–5	Chiles Center (401); Portland, OR
12/17/2017*; 2:00 pm		Weber State	L 70–91	4–6	Chiles Center (353); Portland, OR
12/20/2017*; 1:00 pm		Saint Francis (PA)	L 101–106 ^{2OT}	4–7	Chiles Center (380); Portland, OR
WCC regular season
12/28/2017; 7:00 pm		BYU	L 58–72	4–8 (0–1)	Chiles Center (495); Portland, OR
12/30/2017; 2:00 pm		at San Francisco	L 75–84	4–9 (0–2)	War Memorial Gymnasium (347); San Francisco, CA
01/04/2018; 6:00 pm		at San Diego	L 52–59	4–10 (0–3)	Jenny Craig Pavilion (304); San Diego, CA
01/06/2018; 2:00 pm		Santa Clara	L 43–50	4–11 (0–4)	Chiles Center (333); Portland, OR
01/11/2018; 7:00 pm		Gonzaga	L 56–70	4–12 (0–5)	Chiles Center (415); Portland, OR
01/13/2018; 2:00 pm		at Pacific	L 55–91	4–13 (0–6)	Alex G. Spanos Center (360); Stockton, CA
01/18/2018; 7:00 pm		San Diego	L 60–75	4–14 (0–7)	Chiles Center (354); Portland, OR
01/20/2018; 2:00 pm		Loyola Marymount	L 60–63	4–15 (0–8)	Chiles Center (324); Portland, OR
01/25/2018; 6:00 pm		at Gonzaga	L 36–75	4–16 (0–9)	McCarthey Athletic Center (5,309); Spokane, WA
01/27/2018; 2:00 pm		Saint Mary's	W 68–65	5–16 (1–9)	Chiles Center (348); Portland, OR
02/01/2018; 7:00 pm		at Pepperdine	L 79–83	5–17 (1–10)	Firestone Fieldhouse (183); Malibu, CA
02/03/2018; 2:00 pm		at Loyola Marymount	L 55–76	5–18 (1–11)	Gersten Pavilion (256); Los Angeles, CA
02/08/2018; 7:00 pm		San Francisco	L 63–76	5–19 (1–12)	Chiles Center (344); Portland, OR
02/10/2018; 2:00 pm		Pacific	W 89–67	6–19 (2–12)	Chiles Center (342); Portland, OR
02/15/2018; 7:00 pm		at Santa Clara	L 57–67	6–20 (2–13)	Leavey Center (303); Santa Clara, CA
02/17/2018; 2:00 pm		at Saint Mary's	L 49–77	6–21 (2–14)	McKeon Pavilion (421); Moraga, CA
02/22/2018; 6:00 pm, BYUtv		at BYU	L 35–73	6–22 (2–15)	Marriott Center (1,010); Provo, UT
02/24/2018; 2:00 pm		Pepperdine	W 82–58	7–22 (3–15)	Chiles Center (507); Portland, OR
WCC Women's Tournament
03/01/2018; 2:00 pm, BYUtv	(10)	vs. (7) Pacific; First Round	L 60–85	7–23	Orleans Arena (6,685); Paradise, NV
*Non-conference game. ^{#}Rankings from AP Poll. (#) Tournament seedings in parentheses. All times are in Pacific Time.

== See also ==
- 2017–18 Portland Pilots men's basketball team
