= 2017–18 Gonzaga Bulldogs women's basketball team =

Intercollegiate basketball season

2017–18 Gonzaga Bulldogs women's basketball

WCC Regular Season and Tournament Champions

NCAA Women's Tournament, first round
- Conference: West Coast Conference
- Record: 27–6 (17–1 WCC)
- Head coach: Lisa Fortier (4th season)
- Assistant coaches: Jordan Green; Stacy Clinesmith; Craig Fortier
- Home arena: McCarthey Athletic Center

2017–18 West Coast Conference women's basketball standings
	Conf.				Overall
Team	W		L	PCT	W		L	PCT
Gonzaga †	17	–	1	.944	27	–	6	.818
Saint Mary's	13	–	5	.722	20	–	11	.645
Loyola Marymount	11	–	7	.611	19	–	11	.633
BYU	11	–	7	.611	16	–	14	.533
San Francisco	10	–	8	.556	16	–	15	.516
San Diego	8	–	10	.444	17	–	15	.531
Pacific	7	–	11	.389	15	–	17	.469
Pepperdine	5	–	13	.278	10	–	21	.323
Santa Clara	5	–	13	.278	9	–	21	.300
Portland	3	–	15	.167	7	–	23	.233
† 2018 WCC tournament winner As of 17 March 2018; Rankings from AP poll

The 2017–18 Gonzaga Bulldogs women's basketball team represented Gonzaga University in the 2017–18 NCAA Division I women's basketball season. The Bulldogs (also informally referred to as the "Zags"), were members of the West Coast Conference. The Bulldogs, led by fourth year head coach Lisa Fortier, played their home games at the McCarthey Athletic Center on the university campus in Spokane, Washington. They finished the season 27–6, 17–1 in WCC play to win the WCC regular season. They defeated Pepperdine, San Francisco and San Diego to become champions of the WCC women's basketball tournament to earn an automatic trip to the NCAA women's tournament where they lost in the first round to Stanford.

== Previous season ==
They finished the season 26–7, 14–4 in WCC play to win the WCC regular season. They defeat Pacific, San Francisco and Saint Mary's to become champions of the WCC women's basketball tournament to earn an automatic trip to the NCAA women's tournament where they were defeated by Oklahoma in the first round.

== Roster ==
2017–18 Gonzaga Bulldogs women's basketball team
Players
Coaches

Pos.	#	Name	Height	Year	Previous school	Hometown
F	0	Zykera Rice	6 ft 1 in (1.85 m)	Jr	Clover Park	Tacoma, WA
F	3	Jenn Wirth	6 ft 3 in (1.91 m)	Fr	Seton Catholic	Chandler, AZ
F	4	LeeAnne Wirth	6 ft 3 in (1.91 m)	Fr	Seton Catholic	Chandler, AZ
G	5	Louise Forsyth	6 ft 0 in (1.83 m)	Fr	Brookswood Secondary	Langley, BC
F	10	Gillian Barfield	6 ft 1 in (1.85 m)	Fr	Phoenix Country Day School	Phoenix, AZ
G	11	Laura Stockton	5 ft 8 in (1.73 m)	Jr	Gonzaga Prep	Spokane, WA
C	12	Emma Wolfram	6 ft 5 in (1.96 m)	RS Sr	South Kamloops	Kamloops, BC
F	13	Jill Barta	6 ft 3 in (1.91 m)	RS Jr	Fairfield	Fairfield, MT
G	14	Emma Stach	5 ft 9 in (1.75 m)	Sr	Avides Hurricanes	Buchholz, Germany
G	15	Jessie Loera	5 ft 6 in (1.68 m)	So	Moses Lake	Moses Lake, WA
G	22	Corryn Douglas	6 ft 0 in (1.83 m)	So	Newbury Park	Newbury Park, CA
G	24	Katie Campbell	5 ft 10 in (1.78 m)	So	Ventura; Ventura College	Oxnard, CA
G	30	Chandler Smith	6 ft 0 in (1.83 m)	RS Jr	Brewster; Nebraska	Brewster, WA
G	32	Jill Townsend	5 ft 11 in (1.8 m)	Fr	Okanogan	Okanogan, WA

Head coach

- Lisa Fortier (Cal State Monterey)

Assistant coach(es)

- Jordan Green (George Fox)
- Stacy Clinesmith (UC Santa Barbara)
- Craig Fortier (Cal State Monterey)

Legend

- (C) Team captain
- (S) Suspended
- (I) Ineligible
- (W) Walk-on
- Injured
- Current redshirt

Roster

== Schedule ==
Date time, TV	Rank^{#}	Opponent^{#}	Result	Record	Site (attendance) city, state
Exhibition
11/05/2017*; 2:00 pm		Northwest Christian	W 96–35		McCarthey Athletic Center (5,435); Spokane, WA
Non-conference regular season
11/13/2017*; 5:00 pm		at Colorado State	L 49–65	0–1	Moby Arena (1,137); Fort Collins, CO
11/18/2017*; 6:00 pm		at Montana	W 70–55	1–1	Dahlberg Arena (3,520); Missoula, MT
11/23/2017*; 8:00 pm		vs. Belmont; Play4Kay Shootout Quarterfinals	L 63–71	1–2	Mandalay Bay Arena (323); Paradise, NV
11/24/2017*; 3:00 pm		vs. Kent State; Play4Kay Shootout Consolation 2nd round	W 77–57	2–2	Mandalay Bay Arena (343); Paradise, NV
11/25/2017*; 3:00 pm		vs. DePaul; Play4Kay Shootout 5th place game	L 71–88	2–3	Mandalay Bay Arena (230); Paradise, NV
11/30/2017*; 6:00 pm, SWX		Eastern Washington	W 69–45	3–3	McCarthey Athletic Center (5,394); Spokane, WA
12/02/2017*; 2:00 pm		Portland State	W 91–52	4–3	McCarthey Athletic Center (5,298); Spokane, WA
12/06/2017*; 7:00 pm, P12N		at Washington State	W 62–56	5–3	Beasley Coliseum (977); Pullman, WA
12/09/2017*; 2:00 pm, SWX		UNLV	L 50–52	5–4	McCarthey Athletic Center (5,378); Spokane, WA
12/17/2017*; 2:00 pm		Saint Francis (PA)	W 97–74	6–4	McCarthey Athletic Center (5,438); Spokane, WA
12/21/2017*; 6:00 pm		Western Illinois	W 80–65	7–4	McCarthey Athletic Center (5,548); Spokane, WA
WCC regular season
12/28/2017; 7:00 pm		at Pacific	W 99–72	8–4 (1–0)	Alex G. Spanos Center (716); Stockton, CA
12/30/2017; 2:00 pm		at Santa Clara	W 63–51	9–4 (2–0)	Leavey Center (402); Santa Clara, CA
01/04/2018; 6:00 pm		Pepperdine	W 73–51	10–4 (3–0)	McCarthey Athletic Center (5,452); Spokane, WA
01/06/2018; 2:00 pm		Loyola Marymount	W 77–67	11–4 (4–0)	McCarthey Athletic Center (5,638); Spokane, WA
01/11/2018; 7:00 pm		at Portland	W 70–56	12–4 (5–0)	Chiles Center (415); Portland, OR
01/13/2018; 2:00 pm, SWX		San Francisco	W 74–47	13–4 (6–0)	McCarthey Athletic Center (5,566); Spokane, WA
01/18/2018; 6:30 pm		at Saint Mary's	W 73–65	14–4 (7–0)	McKeon Pavilion (476); Moraga, CA
01/20/2018; 2:00 pm, SWX		Santa Clara	W 71–44	15–4 (8–0)	McCarthey Athletic Center (6,000); Spokane, WA
01/25/2018; 6:00 pm		Portland	W 75–36	16–4 (9–0)	McCarthey Athletic Center (5,309); Spokane, WA
01/27/2018; 2:00 pm		at San Francisco	W 81–57	17–4 (10–0)	War Memorial Gymnaisum (415); San Francisco, CA
02/01/2018; 6:00 pm		at San Diego	W 63–44	18–4 (11–0)	Jenny Craig Pavilion (675); San Diego, CA
02/03/2018; 1:00 pm, BYUtv		at BYU	W 84–70	19–4 (12–0)	Marriott Center (1,327); Provo, UT
02/08/2018; 6:00 pm		Pacific	W 90–66	20–4 (13–0)	McCarthey Athletic Center (5,384); Spokane, WA
02/10/2018; 2:00 pm, SWX		Saint Mary's	L 56–72	20–5 (13–1)	McCarthey Athletic Center (6,000); Spokane, WA
02/15/2018; 7:00 pm		at Loyola Marymount	W 75–69	21–5 (14–1)	Gersten Pavilion (259); Los Angeles, CA
02/17/2018; 1:00 pm		at Pepperdine	W 67–48	22–5 (15–1)	Firestone Fieldhouse (223); Malibu, CA
02/22/2018; 6:00 pm		San Diego	W 58–54	23–5 (16–1)	McCarthey Athletic Center (5,712); Spokane, WA
02/24/2018; 2:00 pm, SWX		BYU	W 62–37	24–5 (17–1)	McCarthey Athletic Center (5,733); Spokane, WA
WCC Women's Tournament
03/02/2018; 12:00 pm, BYUtv	(1)	vs. (8) Pepperdine; Quarterfinals	W 81–70	25–5	Orleans Arena; Paradise, NV
03/05/2018; 12:00 pm, BYUtv	(1)	vs. (5) San Francisco; Semifinals	W 65–53	26–5	Orleans Arena; Paradise, NV
03/06/2018; 1:00 pm, ESPNU	(1)	vs. (6) San Diego; Championship Game	W 79–71	27–5	Orleans Arena (6,661); Paradise, NV
NCAA Women's Tournament
03/17/2018*; 3:00 pm, ESPN2	(13 S)	at (4 S) No. 15 Stanford; First Round	L 68–82	27–6	Maples Pavilion (2,686); Stanford, CA
*Non-conference game. ^{#}Rankings from AP Poll. (#) Tournament seedings in parentheses. L=Lexington Region. All times are in Pacific Time.

== Rankings ==
2017–18 NCAA Division I women's basketball rankings

Regular season polls
Poll	Pre- season	Week 2	Week 3	Week 4	Week 5	Week 6	Week 7	Week 8	Week 9	Week 10	Week 11	Week 12	Week 13	Week 14	Week 15	Week 16	Week 17	Week 18	Week 19	Final
AP	RV	RV	NR	NR	NR	NR	NR	NR	NR	NR	NR	RV	RV	RV	RV	RV	RV	RV	RV	N/A
Coaches	RV	N/A	NR	NR	NR	NR	NR	NR	NR	NR	NR	NR	NR	NR	NR	NR	NR	NR	NR	

Legend
	Increase in ranking
	Decrease in ranking
	No change
(RV)	Received votes
(NR)	Not ranked

== See also ==
- 2017–18 Gonzaga Bulldogs men's basketball team
