= 2017–18 San Francisco Dons women's basketball team =

Intercollegiate basketball season

2017–18 San Francisco Dons women's basketball
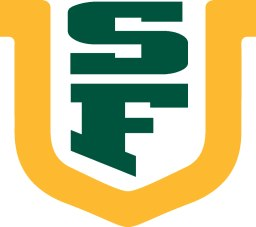
- Conference: West Coast Conference
- Record: 16–15 (10–8 WCC)
- Head coach: Molly Goodenbour (2nd season)
- Assistant coaches: Natasha Smith; Janell Jones; Arthur Moreira
- Home arena: War Memorial Gymnasium

2017–18 West Coast Conference women's basketball standings
| | Conf. | | | | Overall |
| Team | W | | L | PCT | W | | L | PCT |
|---|---|---|---|---|---|---|---|---|
| Gonzaga † | 17 | – | 1 | .944 | 27 | – | 6 | .818 |
| Saint Mary's | 13 | – | 5 | .722 | 20 | – | 11 | .645 |
| Loyola Marymount | 11 | – | 7 | .611 | 19 | – | 11 | .633 |
| BYU | 11 | – | 7 | .611 | 16 | – | 14 | .533 |
| San Francisco | 10 | – | 8 | .556 | 16 | – | 15 | .516 |
| San Diego | 8 | – | 10 | .444 | 17 | – | 15 | .531 |
| Pacific | 7 | – | 11 | .389 | 15 | – | 17 | .469 |
| Pepperdine | 5 | – | 13 | .278 | 10 | – | 21 | .323 |
| Santa Clara | 5 | – | 13 | .278 | 9 | – | 21 | .300 |
| Portland | 3 | – | 15 | .167 | 7 | – | 23 | .233 |
† 2018 WCC tournament winner As of 17 March 2018; Rankings from AP poll

The 2017–18 San Francisco Dons women's basketball team represented the University of San Francisco in the 2017–18 NCAA Division I women's basketball season. They were led by head coach Molly Goodenbour in her second season at San Francisco. The Dons, as members of the West Coast Conference, played their home games at War Memorial Gymnasium. They finished the season 16–15, 10–8 in WCC play to finish in fifth place. They advanced to the semifinals of the WCC women's tournament, where they lost to Gonzaga.

== Previous season ==
They finished the season 18–13, 11–7 in WCC play to finish in fourth place. They advanced to the semifinals of the WCC women's tournament where they lost to Gonzaga.

== Roster ==
2017–18 San Francisco Dons women's basketball team
Players
Coaches

| Pos. | # | Name | Height | Year | Previous school | Hometown |
|---|---|---|---|---|---|---|
| G | 1 | Anna Pierce | 5 ft 6 in (1.68 m) | So | Parish Episcopal | Plano, TX |
| F/C | 4 | Moa Lundqvist | 6 ft 1 in (1.85 m) | So | BG LULEÅ; Odessa College | Östersund, Sweden |
| F/C | 11 | Bec Black | 6 ft 2 in (1.88 m) | Fr | Barker College | Coffs Harbour, Australia |
| G | 13 | Nia Alexander | 5 ft 9 in (1.75 m) | So | Todd Beamer | Federal Way, WA |
| F | 14 | Michaela Rakova | 6 ft 3 in (1.91 m) | Sr | Gymnazium Hubeneho | Ivanka pri Dunaji, Slovakia |
| G | 21 | Anna Seilund | 5 ft 9 in (1.75 m) | Sr | Falkonergaarden | Copenhagen, Denmark |
| F | 23 | Alicia Roufosse | 6 ft 3 in (1.91 m) | RS Jr | W. J. Mouat | Abbotsford, BC |
| G | 24 | Veronica Preciado | 5 ft 9 in (1.75 m) | Jr | Grant Union; Eastern Arizona JC | Sacramento, CA |
| G | 33 | Shannon Powell | 5 ft 6 in (1.68 m) | Jr | Bel Air; Cochise College | El Paso, TX |
| G | 35 | Kalyn Simon | 5 ft 9 in (1.75 m) | RS Sr | Archbishop Mitty | San Jose, CA |
| G | 43 | Ninni Salmi | 6 ft 2 in (1.88 m) | RS So | Mäkelänrinne | Kauhajoki, Finland |

Head coach

- Molly Goodenbour (Stanford)

Assistant coach(es)

- Natasha Smith (Chico State)
- Janell Jones (Oklahoma Christian)
- Arthur Moreira (Sonoma State)

Legend

- (C) Team captain
- (S) Suspended
- (I) Ineligible
- (W) Walk-on
- Injured
- Current redshirt

Roster
Last update: January 13, 2018

== Schedule and results ==
| Date time, TV | Rank^{#} | Opponent^{#} | Result | Record | Site (attendance) city, state |
Non-conference regular season
| 11/10/2017*; 6:00 pm | | Cal Poly | W 83–71 | 1–0 | War Memorial Gymnasium (300); San Francisco, CA |
| 11/15/2017*; 7:00 pm | | Washington State | L 70–74 | 1–1 | War Memorial Gymnasium (358); San Francisco, CA |
| 11/19/2017*; 1:00 pm | | at Northern Colorado | L 60–73 | 1–2 | Bank of Colorado Arena (608); Greeley, CO |
| 11/25/2017*; 2:00 pm | | vs. Robert Morris; Cal Poly Holiday Classic | W 57–45 | 2–2 | Robert A. Mott Athletics Center (75); San Luis Obispo, CA |
| 11/25/2017*; 12:00 pm | | at Cal Poly; Cal Poly Holiday Classic | L 83–88 | 2–3 | Robert A. Mott Athletics Center (152); San Luis Obispo, CA |
| 11/29/2017*; 7:00 pm | | No. 16 Stanford | L 66–86 | 2–4 | War Memorial Gymnasium (775); San Francisco, CA |
| 12/01/2017*; 7:00 pm | | at San Jose State | W 87–81 | 3–4 | Event Center Arena (773); San Jose, CA |
| 12/06/2017*; 5:00 pm | | at UC Davis | L 55–72 | 3–5 | The Pavilion; Davis, CA |
| 12/15/2017*; 6:00 pm | | Sacramento State | W 90–76 | 4–5 | War Memorial Gymnasium (202); San Francisco, CA |
| 12/17/2017*; 2:00 pm | | Fresno State | W 70–62 | 5–5 | War Memorial Gymnasium (302); San Francisco, CA |
| 12/21/2017*; 2:30 pm, ESPN3 | | at Texas–Arlington | L 54–56 | 5–6 | College Park Center (1,937); Arlington, TX |
WCC regular season
| 12/28/2017; 7:00 pm | | San Diego | L 54–60 | 5–7 (0–1) | War Memorial Gymnasium; San Francisco, CA |
| 12/30/2017; 2:00 pm | | Portland | W 84–75 | 6–7 (1–1) | War Memorial Gymnasium (347); San Francisco, CA |
| 01/04/2018; 6:00 pm, BYUtv | | at BYU | L 66–70 | 6–8 (1–2) | Marriott Center (560); Provo, UT |
| 01/06/2018; 2:00 pm | | Pepperdine | W 68–67 | 7–8 (2–2) | War Memorial Gymnasium (348); San Francisco, CA |
| 01/11/2018; 7:00 pm | | Loyola Marymount | W 78–60 | 8–8 (3–2) | War Memorial Gymnasium (281); San Francisco, CA |
| 01/13/2018; 2:00 pm | | at Gonzaga | L 47–74 | 8–9 (3–3) | McCarthey Athletic Center (5,566); Spokane, WA |
| 01/18/2018; 7:00 pm | | at Santa Clara | W 58–54 | 9–9 (4–3) | Leavey Center (642); Santa Clara, CA |
| 01/20/2018; 1:00 pm | | at Pepperdine | L 92–95 ^{2OT} | 9–10 (4–4) | Firestone Fieldhouse (142); Malibu, CA |
| 01/25/2018; 11:00 am | | at Pacific | W 81–71 | 10–10 (5–4) | Alex G. Spanos Center (3,725); Stockton, CA |
| 01/27/2018; 2:00 pm | | Gonzaga | L 57–81 | 10–11 (5–5) | War Memorial Gymnasium (415); San Francisco, CA |
| 02/01/2018; 7:00 pm | | Saint Mary's | L 59–73 | 10–12 (5–6) | War Memorial Gymnasium (473); San Francisco, CA |
| 02/03/2018; 2:00 pm | | Santa Clara | W 64–47 | 11–12 (6–6) | War Memorial Gymnasium (358); San Francisco, CA |
| 02/08/2018; 7:00 pm | | at Portland | W 76–63 | 12–12 (7–6) | Chiles Center (344); Portland, OR |
| 02/10/2018; 2:00 pm | | BYU | W 76–73 | 13–12 (8–6) | War Memorial Gymnasium (337); San Francisco, CA |
| 02/15/2018; 6:30 pm | | at Saint Mary's | L 64–72 | 13–13 (8–7) | McKeon Pavilion (271); Moraga, CA |
| 02/17/2018; 2:00 pm | | at Loyola Marymount | L 60–65 | 13–14 (8–8) | Gersten Pavilion (304); Los Angeles, CA |
| 02/22/2018; 7:00 pm | | Pacific | W 80–78 | 14–14 (9–8) | War Memorial Gymnasium (473); San Francisco, CA |
| 02/24/2018; 2:00 pm | | at San Diego | W 49–47 | 15–14 (10–8) | Jenny Craig Pavilion (688); San Diego, CA |
WCC Women's Tournament
| 03/01/2018; 8:00 pm, BYUtv | (5) | vs. (4) Loyola Marymount; Quarterfinals | W 89–76 | 16–14 | Orleans Arena; Paradise, NV |
| 03/05/2018; 12:00 pm, BYUtv | (5) | vs. (1) Gonzaga; Semifinals | L 53–65 | 16–15 | Orleans Arena; Paradise, NV |
*Non-conference game. ^{#}Rankings from AP Poll. (#) Tournament seedings in parentheses. All times are in Pacific Time.

== See also ==
- 2017–18 San Francisco Dons men's basketball team
