= Richmond Christian School =

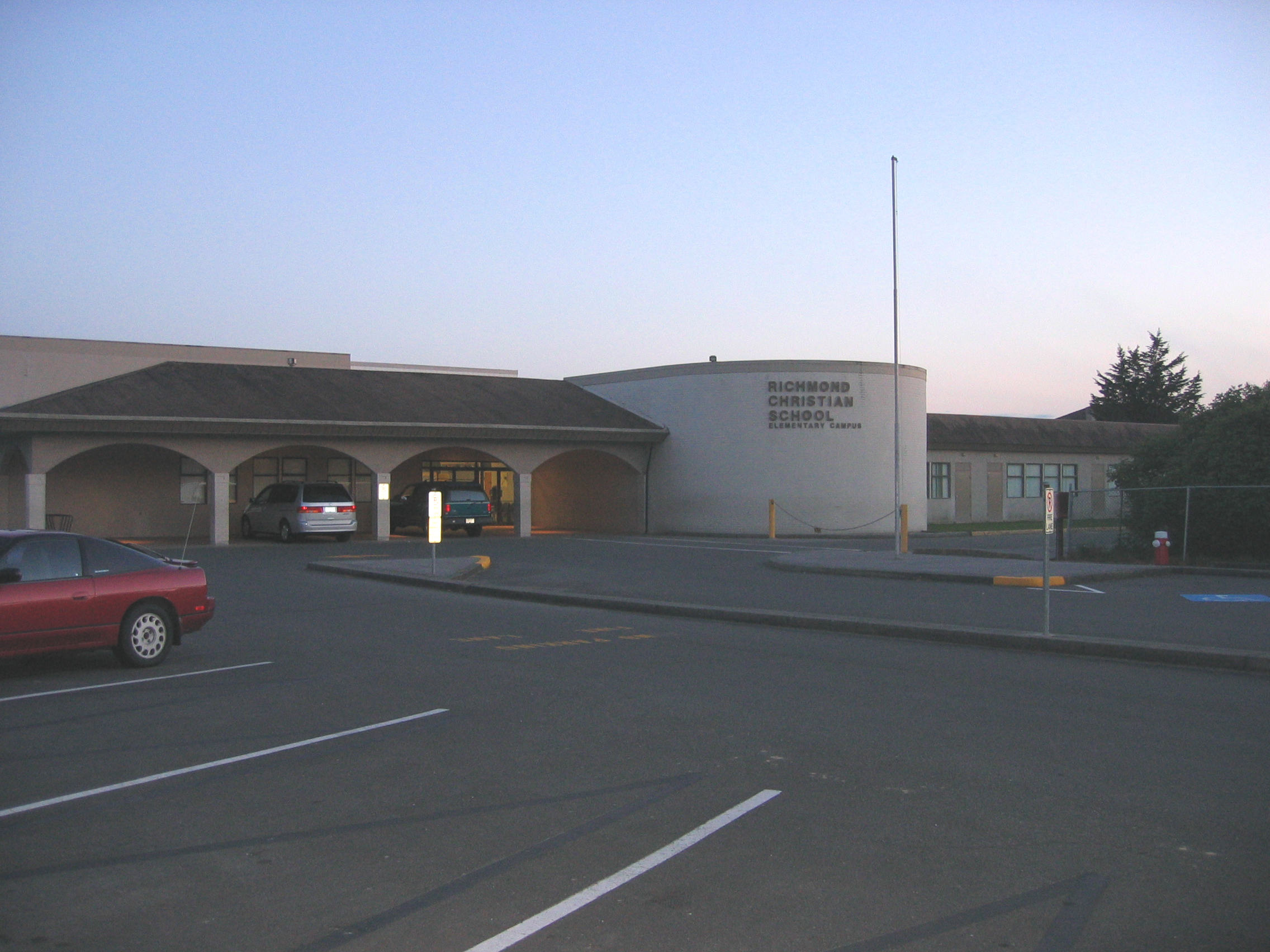
- Richmond Christian School's Elementary Campus

Location
- 5240 Woodwards Road (Elementary Campus) 10200 Number 5 Road (Middle Campus) 10260 Number 5 Road (Secondary Campus); Richmond, British Columbia; Canada

Information
- School type: Elementary school, Middle School, Secondary School
- Religious affiliation: Christian
- Denomination: Non-denominational
- Established: September 27th, 1957
- Superintendent: James Sijpheer
- Principal: Jason Paul (Elementary Campus), Angela Laing (Middle Campus), Gareth Jones (Secondary Campus)
- Grades: Preschool - 12
- Language: English
- Mascot: Eagles
- Teams: Richmond Christian School Eagles
- Website: www.myrcs.ca

Richmond Christian School is a private, independent Christian school located in Richmond, British Columbia, Canada. The school is composed of three campuses: an elementary campus, a middle campus, and a secondary campus. The Little Eagles Preschool is also located in the elementary campus, in the western part of Richmond; the remainder of the school is at the end of Richmond. Richmond Christian was ranked by the Fraser Institute in 2014 as 22nd out of 289 British Columbian secondary schools and in 2018 it was ranked the 5th out of 252.

== History ==
Richmond Christian School began on September 27, 1957 with 37 students ranging from grades 1 to 8. In 1992, Richmond Christian merged with the Seacliff Christian School after a two-year process, and unified to become the Richmond Christian School.
