= 2017–18 Arizona State Sun Devils women's basketball team =

Intercollegiate basketball season

2017–18 Arizona State Sun Devils women's basketball

ASU Classic Champions

NCAA Women's Tournament, second round
- Conference: Pac-12 Conference
- Record: 22–13 (10–8 Pac-12)
- Head coach: Charli Turner Thorne (21st season)
- Assistant coaches: Jackie Moore; Angie Nelp; Briann January
- Home arena: Wells Fargo Arena

2017–18 Pac-12 Conference women's basketball standings
	Conf.				Overall
Team	W		L	PCT	W		L	PCT
No. 6 Oregon †	16	–	2	.889	33	–	5	.868
No. 15 Stanford	14	–	3	.824	24	–	11	.686
No. 9 UCLA	14	–	4	.778	27	–	8	.771
No. 13 Oregon State	14	–	4	.778	26	–	8	.765
California	11	–	7	.611	21	–	11	.656
Arizona State	10	–	8	.556	22	–	13	.629
USC	9	–	9	.500	20	–	11	.645
Utah	8	–	10	.444	18	–	14	.563
Colorado	5	–	13	.278	15	–	16	.484
Washington State	3	–	14	.176	10	–	20	.333
Arizona	2	–	16	.111	6	–	24	.200
Washington	1	–	17	.056	7	–	23	.233
† 2018 Pac-12 Tournament winner As of 26 March 2018; Rankings from AP Poll

The 2017–18 Arizona State Sun Devils women's basketball team represented Arizona State University during the 2017–18 NCAA Division I women's basketball season. The Sun Devils, led by 21st-year head coach Charli Turner Thorne, played their games at the Wells Fargo Arena and were members of the Pac-12 Conference. They finished the season 22–13, 10–8 in Pac-12 play to finish in sixth place. They advanced to the semifinals of the Pac-12 women's tournament, where they lost to Stanford. They received an at-large bid to the NCAA women's tournament, where they defeated Nebraska in the first round before losing to Texas in the second round.

== Previous season ==
They finished the season 20–13, 9–9 in Pac-12 play to finish in fifth place. They advanced to the quarterfinals of the Pac-12 women's tournament, where they lost to UCLA. They received an at-large bid to the NCAA women's tournament, where they defeated Michigan State in the first round before losing to South Carolina in the second round.

== Roster ==
2017–18 Arizona State Sun Devils women's basketball team
Players
Coaches

Pos.	#	Name	Height	Year	Previous school	Hometown
G	1	Reili Richardson	5 ft 9 in (1.75 m)	So	Brea Olinda	Brea, CA
G	3	Sabrina Haines	5 ft 10 in (1.78 m)	Jr	Desert Vista	Phoenix, AZ
G	4	Kiara Russell	5 ft 8 in (1.73 m)	So	Osseo	Minneapolis, MN
G	11	Robbi Ryan	5 ft 8 in (1.73 m)	So	Sheridan	Sheridan, WY
F	21	Sophia Elenga	6 ft 1 in (1.85 m)	Jr	Lycee Alain Fournier	Nogent-sur-Oise, France
G	22	Courtney Ekmark	6 ft 0 in (1.83 m)	RS Jr	St. Mary's; Connecticut	Arcadia, AZ
G/F	24	Bre’yanna Sanders	6 ft 0 in (1.83 m)	Fr	Clovis West	Fresno, CA
C	33	Charnea Johnson-Chapman	6 ft 3 in (1.91 m)	Jr	Canyon Springs	Moreno Valley, CA
F	42	Kianna Ibis	6 ft 1 in (1.85 m)	Jr	Benson	Omaha, NE
C	44	Eva Rubin	6 ft 5 in (1.96 m)	Fr	Homewood Flossmoor	Flossmoor, IL
F	52	Jamie Ruden	6 ft 1 in (1.85 m)	So	John Marshall	Rochester, MN

Head coach

- Charli Turner Thorne (Stanford)

Assistant coach(es)

- Jackie Moore (Armstrong State)
- Angie Nelp (Colorado State)
- Briann January (Arizona State)

Legend

- (C) Team captain
- (S) Suspended
- (I) Ineligible
- (W) Walk-on
- Injured
- Current redshirt

Roster
Last update: February 24, 2018

== Schedule ==
Date time, TV	Rank^{#}	Opponent^{#}	Result	Record	Site (attendance) city, state
Non-conference regular season
11/12/2017*; 2:00 pm		UTSA	W 74–42	1–0	Wells Fargo Arena (4,639); Tempe, AZ
11/15/2017*; 4:00 pm		at Fresno State	W 86–49	2–0	Save Mart Center (2,209); Fresno, CA
11/18/2017*; 2:00 pm		Sacramento State	W 106–58	3–0	Wells Fargo Arena (1,788); Tucson, AZ
11/19/2017*; 3:00 pm		Colgate	W 65–54	4–0	Wells Fargo Arena (5,394); Tucson, AZ
11/23/2017*; 11:30 am	No. 24	vs. No. 7 Mississippi State; Cancún Challenge Mayan Division	L 57–65	4–1	Hard Rock Hotel Riviera Maya (982); Cancún, Mexico
11/24/2017*; 11:30 am	No. 24	vs. Green Bay; Cancún Challenge Mayan Division	L 48–61	4–2	Hard Rock Hotel Riviera Maya; Cancún, Mexico
11/25/2017*; 11:30 am	No. 24	vs. Columbia; Cancún Challenge Mayan Division	W 72–48	5–2	Hard Rock Hotel Riviera Maya (982); Cancún, Mexico
12/02/2017*; 2:30 pm, P12N		Buffalo; ASU Classic semifinals	W 76–47	6–2	Wells Fargo Arena (2,233); Tucson, AZ
12/03/2017*; 2:30 pm		UC Riverside; ASU Classic championship	W 73–48	7–2	Wells Fargo Arena (1,523); Tucson, AZ
12/10/2017*; 12:00 pm		at No. 13 Florida State	L 66–77	7–3	Donald L. Tucker Center (3,671); Tallahassee, FL
12/18/2017*; 6:00 pm		Idaho	W 77–33	8–3	Wells Fargo Arena (1,723); Tucson, AZ
12/21/2017*; 2:00 pm, P12N		Arkansas	W 89–43	9–3	Wells Fargo Arena (1,988); Tucson, AZ
Pac-12 regular season
12/29/2017; 7:00 pm, P12N		at Colorado	W 72–47	10–3 (1–0)	Coors Events Center (1,860); Boulder, CO
12/31/2017; 12:00 pm		at Utah	W 83–81	11–3 (2–0)	Jon M. Huntsman Center (1,463); Salt Lake City, UT
01/05/2018; 8:00 pm, P12N	No. 25	No. 23 California	W 80–71	12–3 (3–0)	Wells Fargo Arena (2,239); Tempe, AZ
01/07/2018; 2:00 pm, ESPN2	No. 25	No. 24 Stanford	W 73–66	13–3 (4–0)	Wells Fargo Arena (3,096); Tempe, AZ
01/12/2018; 7:00 pm, P12N	No. 18	at No. 22 Oregon State	L 54–57	13–4 (4–1)	Gill Coliseum (3,954); Corvallis, OR
01/14/2018; 6:00 pm, P12N	No. 18	at No. 8 Oregon	L 54–64	13–5 (4–2)	Matthew Knight Arena (4,416); Eugene, OR
01/19/2018; 11:00 am	No. 22	Utah	L 56–58	13–6 (4–3)	Wells Fargo Arena (5,787); Tempe, AZ
01/21/2018; 2:00 pm, P12N	No. 22	Colorado	W 73–59	14–6 (5–3)	Wells Fargo Arena (2,008); Boulder, CO
01/26/2018; 8:00 pm, P12N	No. 25	at Stanford	L 50–74	14–7 (5–4)	Maples Pavilion (2,905); Stanford, CA
01/28/2018; 4:00 pm, P12N	No. 25	at No. 23 California	W 57–42	15–7 (6–4)	Haas Pavilion (2,521); Berkeley, CA
02/02/2018; 8:00 pm, P12N		Washington	W 61–41	16–7 (7–4)	Wells Fargo Arena (2,078); Tempe, AZ
02/04/2018; 2:00 pm		Washington State	W 77–51	17–7 (8–4)	Wells Fargo Arena (1,588); Tempe, AZ
02/09/2018; 8:00 pm	No. 25	at USC	L 62–77	17–8 (8–5)	Galen Center (647); Los Angeles, CA
02/11/2018; 2:00 pm, P12N	No. 25	at No. 8 UCLA	L 63–71	17–9 (8–6)	Pauley Pavilion (3,690); Los Angeles, CA
02/16/2018; 7:00 pm, P12N		Arizona; Rivalry	W 75–50	18–9 (9–6)	Wells Fargo Arena (3,025); Tempe, AZ
02/18/2018; 4:00 pm, P12N		at Arizona; Rivalry	W 69–45	19–9 (10–6)	McKale Center (2,154); Tucson, AZ
02/23/2018; 6:00 pm, P12N		No. 8 Oregon	L 44–57	19–10 (10–7)	Wells Fargo Arena (3,446); Tempe, AZ
02/25/2018; 2:00 pm, P12N		No. 12 Oregon State	L 60–64	19–11 (10–8)	Wells Fargo Arena (3,258); Tempe, AZ
Pac-12 Women's Tournament
03/01/2018; 9:30 pm, P12N	(6)	vs. (11) Arizona; First Round	W 76–47	20–11	KeyArena (3,157); Seattle, WA
03/02/2018; 9:30 pm, P12N	(6)	vs. (3) No. 10 Oregon State; Quarterfinals	W 57–51	21–11	KeyArena (4,741); Seattle, WA
03/03/2018; 9:30 pm, P12N	(6)	vs. (2) No. 16 Stanford; Semifinals	L 46–58	21–12	KeyArena (6,889); Seattle, WA
NCAA Women's Tournament
03/17/2018; 12:30 pm, ESPN2	(7 KC)	vs. (10 KC) Nebraska; First Round	W 73–62	22–12	Frank Erwin Center (3,878); Austin, TX
03/19/2018*; 6:00 pm, ESPN2	(7 KC)	at (2 KC) No. 8 Texas; Second Round	L 65–85	22–13	Frank Erwin Center (3,286); Austin, TX
*Non-conference game. ^{#}Rankings from AP Poll. (#) Tournament seedings in parentheses. KC=Kansas City Region. All times are in Mountain Time.

== Rankings ==
Regular season polls
Poll	Pre- season	Week 2	Week 3	Week 4	Week 5	Week 6	Week 7	Week 8	Week 9	Week 10	Week 11	Week 12	Week 13	Week 14	Week 15	Week 16	Week 17	Week 18	Week 19	Final
AP	RV	RV	24	RV	RV	RV	RV	RV	25	18т	22	25	RV	25	RV	NR	RV	RV	RV	N/A
Coaches	RV	N/A	RV	RV	RV	NR	RV	RV	RV	23	25	RV	RV	RV	NR	NR	NR	NR	NR	NR

Legend
	Increase in ranking
	Decrease in ranking
	No change
(RV)	Received votes
(NR)	Not ranked

== See also ==
- 2017–18 Arizona State Sun Devils men's basketball team
