= 2018 Pac-12 Conference women's basketball tournament =

- Classification: Division I
- Season: 2017–18
- Teams: 12
- Site: KeyArena; Seattle, WA
- Champions: Oregon (1st title)
- Winning coach: Kelly Graves (1st title)
- MVP: Sabrina Ionescu (Oregon)
- Attendance: 28,558
- Top scorer: Sabrina Ionescu (Oregon) (63 points)
- Television: Pac-12 Network, ESPN2

2017–18 Pac-12 Conference women's basketball standings
	Conf.				Overall
Team	W		L	PCT	W		L	PCT
No. 6 Oregon †	16	–	2	.889	33	–	5	.868
No. 15 Stanford	14	–	3	.824	24	–	11	.686
No. 9 UCLA	14	–	4	.778	27	–	8	.771
No. 13 Oregon State	14	–	4	.778	26	–	8	.765
California	11	–	7	.611	21	–	11	.656
Arizona State	10	–	8	.556	22	–	13	.629
USC	9	–	9	.500	20	–	11	.645
Utah	8	–	10	.444	18	–	14	.563
Colorado	5	–	13	.278	15	–	16	.484
Washington State	3	–	14	.176	10	–	20	.333
Arizona	2	–	16	.111	6	–	24	.200
Washington	1	–	17	.056	7	–	23	.233
† 2018 Pac-12 Tournament winner As of 26 March 2018; Rankings from AP Poll

The 2018 Pac-12 Conference women's basketball tournament presented by New York Life was the postseason tournament that ended the 2017–18 season of the Pac-12 Conference. The tournament was held at KeyArena in Seattle, Washington from March 1–4, 2018. Regular-season champion Oregon won the tournament and with it the automatic Pac-12 berth in the NCAA tournament.

== Seeds ==
Teams were seeded by conference record, with ties broken in the following order:

- Record between the tied teams
- Record against the highest-seeded team not involved in the tie, going down through the seedings as necessary
- Higher RPI

Seed	School	Conf (Overall)	Tiebreaker
#1	Oregon	16–2 (27–4)	
#2	Stanford	14–3 (20–9)	
#3	Oregon State	14–4 (23–6)	1–1 vs. UCLA, 1–1 vs. ORE
#4	UCLA	14–4 (23–6)	1–1 vs. OSU, 0–2 vs. ORE
#5	California	11–7 (20–9)	
#6	Arizona State	10–8 (19–11)	
#7	USC	9–9 (19–10)	
#8	Utah	8–10 (17–12)	
#9	Colorado	5–13 (14–15)	
#10	Washington State	3–14 (10–19)	
#11	Arizona	2–16 (6–23)	
#12	Washington	1–15 (7–21)	

== Schedule ==
Thursday-Sunday, March 1–4, 2017

The top four seeds received a first-round bye.

Session	Game	Time*	Matchup^{#}	Television	Attendance
First Round – Thursday, March 1
1	1	11:30 AM	#8 Utah vs. #9 Colorado	P12N	3,532
1	2	2:00 PM	#5 California vs. #12 Washington	P12N	3,532
2	3	6:00 PM	#7 USC vs. #10 Washington State	P12N	3,157
2	4	8:30 PM	#6 Arizona State vs. #11 Arizona	P12N	3,157
Quarterfinals – Friday, March 2
3	5	11:30 AM	#1 Oregon vs. #9 Colorado	P12N	4,852
3	6	2:00 PM	#4 UCLA vs. #5 California	P12N	4,852
4	7	6:00 PM	#2 Stanford vs. #7 USC	P12N	4,741
4	8	8:30 PM	#3 Oregon State vs. #6 Arizona State	P12N	4,741
Semifinals – Saturday, March 3
5	9	6:00 PM	#1 Oregon vs. #4 UCLA	P12N	6,889
5	10	8:30 PM	#2 Stanford vs. #6 Arizona State	P12N	6,889
Championship Game – Sunday, March 4
6	11	6:00 PM	#1 Oregon vs. #2 Stanford	ESPN2	5,387
*Game Times in PT.

== Bracket ==
- All times are Pacific

First round Thursday, March 1 P12N; 11:30AM; 2PM; 6PM; 8:30PM
8	Utah	56
9	Colorado	66
5	California	71
12	Washington	68
7	USC	47
10	Washington State	44
6	Arizona State	76
11	Arizona	47

Quarterfinals; Friday, March 2 P12N; 11:30AM; 2PM; 6PM; 8:30PM
9	Colorado	47
1	#6 Oregon	84
5	California	74
4	#9 UCLA	77
7	USC	59
2	#16 Stanford	69
6	Arizona State	57
3	#10 Oregon State	51

Semifinals; Saturday, March 3 P12N; 6PM; 8:30PM
1	#6 Oregon	65
4	#9 UCLA	62
2	#16 Stanford	58
6	Arizona State	46

Championship Game; Sunday, March 4 ESPN2; 6PM
1	#6 Oregon	77
2	#16 Stanford	57

=== All-Tournament Team ===
Name	Pos.	Year	Team
Lexi Bando	G	Sr.	Oregon
Monique Billings	F	Sr.	UCLA
Jordin Canada	G	Sr.	UCLA
Ruthy Hebard	G	So.	Oregon
Sabrina Ionescu	G	So.	Oregon
Kiana Williams	G	Fr.	Stanford

=== Most Outstanding Player ===
Name	Pos.	Year	Team
Sabrina Ionescu	G	So.	Oregon

== See also ==
- 2018 Pac-12 Conference men's basketball tournament
