= Courtney Ekmark =

American basketball player (born 1995)

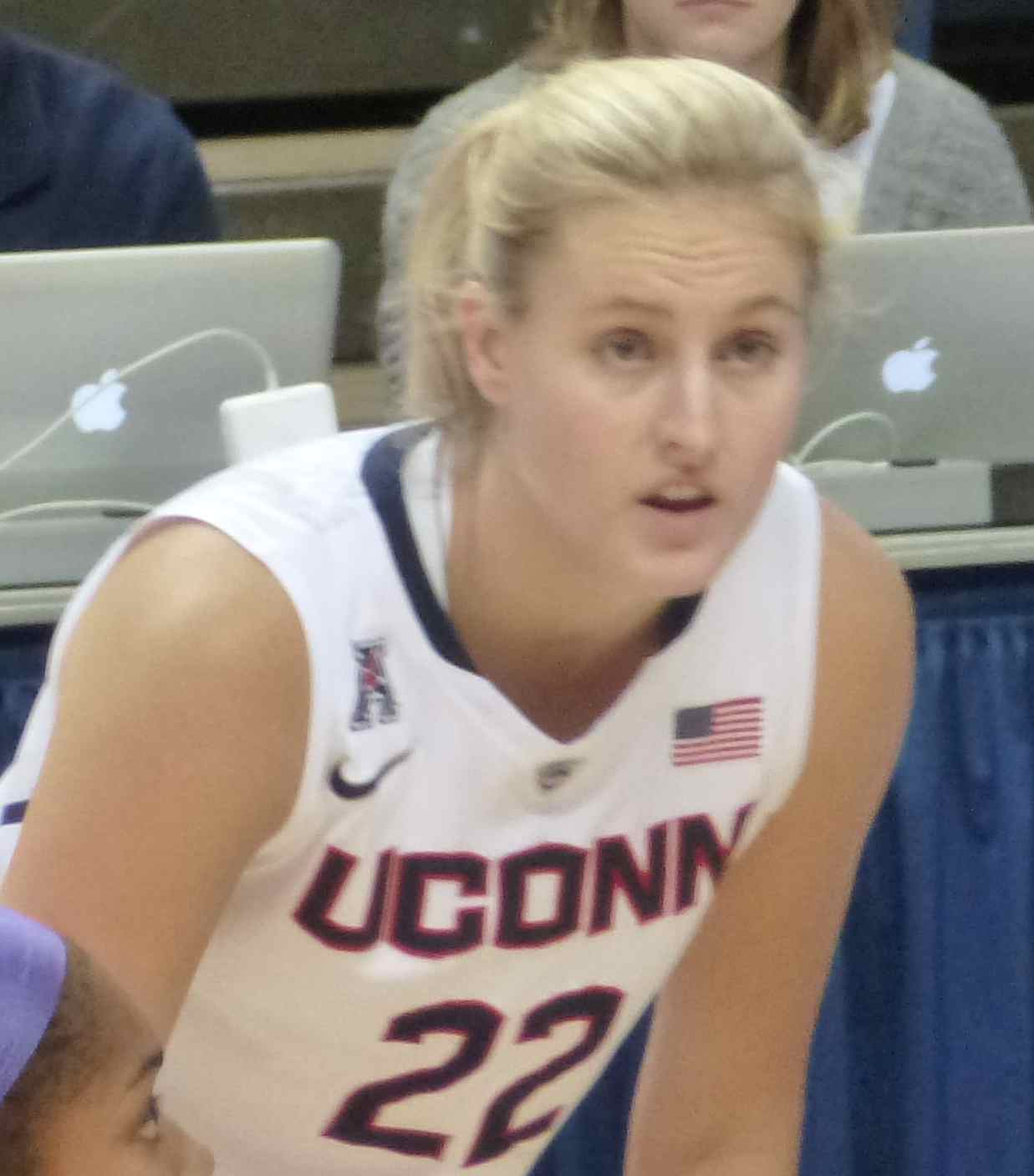

Personal information
- Born: April 8, 1995 (age 31) Phoenix, Arizona, U.S.
- Listed height: 6 ft 0 in (1.83 m)

Career information
- High school: St. Mary's (Phoenix, Arizona)
- College: UConn (2014–2016); Arizona State (2017–2019); Arizona State University College of Law (JD)
- Position: Shooting guard / small forward

Career highlights
- 2× NCAA champion (2015, 2016)

Courtney Ekmark (born April 8, 1995) is an American basketball player who played college basketball at Arizona State University. She played her first two collegiate seasons for the University of Connecticut.

By the time she became eligible to play for Arizona State in 2017, she had received a bachelor's degree from ASU and enrolled in the university's Sandra Day O'Connor College of Law, spending her entire ASU playing career as a law student. She received a J.D. degree in May 2020. At the end of her final season as a player in 2019, she received the Charles T. Stoner Law Scholarship Award from the Women's Basketball Coaches Association, presented annually to a women's college player who plans to pursue a legal career.

Prior to enrolling at UConn she played for St. Mary's High School in Phoenix. She was named Arizona's Gatorade Player of the Year. Ekmark also played tennis in high school.

== Career statistics ==
=== College ===
Legend
GP	Games played	GS	Games started	MPG	Minutes per game	RPG	Rebounds per game
APG	Assists per game	SPG	Steals per game	BPG	Blocks per game	PPG	Points per game
TO	Turnovers per game	FG%	Field-goal percentage	3P%	3-point field-goal percentage	FT%	Free-throw percentage
**Bold**	Career best	°	League leader

=== College ===
Year	Team	GP	GS	MPG	FG%	3P%	FT%	RPG	APG	SPG	BPG	TO	PPG
2014–15	UConn	28	0	9.7	32.8	27.0	16.7	1.4	0.7	0.2	0.0	**0.5**	1.9
2015–16	UConn	33	0	8.9	**44.6**	36.1	50.0	1.1	0.7	0.4	0.0	0.7	2.0
2016–17	Arizona State	Did not play due to NCAA Transfer Rules											
2017–18	Arizona State	**35**	**35**	28.3	**38.6**	**37.4**	**76.8**	**4.5**	**2.1**	**1.1**	**0.1**	1.3	9.7
2018–19	Arizona State	33	33	**28.6**	36.0	32.9	74.6	3.2	1.6	0.7	**0.1**	1.0	**10.3**
**Career**		129	68	19.4	37.5	34.3	72.2	2.6	1.3	0.6	0.1	0.9	6.2
Statistics retrieved from Sports-Reference.
