= 2017–18 UCLA Bruins women's basketball team =

American college basketball season

2017–18 UCLA Bruins women's basketball

NCAA tournament, Elite Eight
- Conference: Pac-12 Conference

Ranking
- Coaches: No. 7
- AP: No. 9
- Record: 27–8 (14–4 Pac-12)
- Head coach: Cori Close (7th season)
- Assistant coaches: Jenny Huth; Tony Newnan; Shannon Perry
- Home arena: Pauley Pavilion

2017–18 Pac-12 Conference women's basketball standings
	Conf.				Overall
Team	W		L	PCT	W		L	PCT
No. 6 Oregon †	16	–	2	.889	33	–	5	.868
No. 15 Stanford	14	–	3	.824	24	–	11	.686
No. 9 UCLA	14	–	4	.778	27	–	8	.771
No. 13 Oregon State	14	–	4	.778	26	–	8	.765
California	11	–	7	.611	21	–	11	.656
Arizona State	10	–	8	.556	22	–	13	.629
USC	9	–	9	.500	20	–	11	.645
Utah	8	–	10	.444	18	–	14	.563
Colorado	5	–	13	.278	15	–	16	.484
Washington State	3	–	14	.176	10	–	20	.333
Arizona	2	–	16	.111	6	–	24	.200
Washington	1	–	17	.056	7	–	23	.233
† 2018 Pac-12 Tournament winner As of 26 March 2018; Rankings from AP Poll

The 2017–18 UCLA Bruins women's basketball team represented the University of California, Los Angeles during the 2017–18 NCAA Division I women's basketball season. The Bruins, led by seventh-year head coach Cori Close, played their home games at the Pauley Pavilion and were members of the Pac-12 Conference. They finished the season 27–8, 14–4 in Pac-12 play, to finish in a tie for third place. They advanced to the semifinals of the Pac-12 women's tournament where they lost to Oregon. They received an at-large bid to the NCAA women's tournament in which they defeated American and Creighton in the first and second rounds, respectively. They went on to defeat Texas in the Sweet Sixteen and advance to the program's first Elite Eight since 1999. They lost to Mississippi State in the Elite Eight.

== Offseason ==
=== Departures ===
Name	Pos.	Height	Year	Hometown	Reason for departure
Nicole Kornet	G	6' 1"	RS Sr.	Lantana, TX	Graduated
Kari Korver	G	6' 1"	RS Sr.	Paramount, CA	Graduated
Dominique Williams	G	5' 8"	RS Jr.	Phoenix, AZ	Medically retired; will serve as an undergraduate assistant during the 2017–18 season
Paulina Hersler	F	6' 3"	RS Jr.	Malmö, Sweden	Graduated; transferred to Florida

=== 2017 recruiting class ===
College recruiting information
Name	Hometown	School	Height	Weight	Commit date
Michaela Onyenwere; F	Aurora, CO	Grandview	5 ft 11 in (1.80 m)	N/A	
Michaela Onyenwere; F	Recruit ratings: ESPN: (98)				
Chantel Horvat; G	Geelong, Australia	Geelong College	6 ft 1 in (1.85 m)	N/A	
Chantel Horvat; G	Recruit ratings: ESPN: (98)				
Kayla Owens; W	Houston, TX	Langham Creek	6 ft 1 in (1.85 m)	N/A	
Kayla Owens; W	Recruit ratings: ESPN: (97)				
Lauryn Miller; F	Kirkwood, MO	Kirkwood	6 ft 1 in (1.85 m)	N/A	
Lauryn Miller; F	Recruit ratings: ESPN: (90)				
Overall recruit ranking:
Note: In many cases, Scout, Rivals, 247Sports, On3, and ESPN may conflict in their listings of height and weight.; In these cases, the average was taken. ESPN grades are on a 100-point scale.; Sources:

== Roster ==
2017–18 UCLA Bruins women's basketball team
Players
Coaches

Pos.	#	Name	Height	Year	Previous school	Hometown
G	0	Chantel Horvat	6 ft 1 in (1.85 m)	Fr	Geelong College	Geelong, Australia
G	1	Kayla Owens (injured) (redshirt)	6 ft 1 in (1.85 m)	Fr	Langham Creek	Houston, TX
G	3	Jordin Canada	5 ft 6 in (1.68 m)	Sr	Windward	Los Angeles, CA
F	4	Ashley Hearn (injured) (redshirt)	6 ft 4 in (1.93 m)	Jr	Sachse	Rowlett, TX
G	5	Lindsey Corsaro (injured) (redshirt)	6 ft 1 in (1.85 m)	RS Fr	Roncalli	Indianapolis, IN
F	10	Ally Rosenblum	6 ft 4 in (1.93 m)	So	Mater Dei	Newport Coast, CA
F	11	Lajahna Drummer	6 ft 1 in (1.85 m)	RS Jr	Long Beach Poly HS	Inglewood, CA
F	21	Michaela Onyenwere	5 ft 11 in (1.8 m)	Fr	Grandview	Aurora, CO
G	22	Kennedy Burke	6 ft 1 in (1.85 m)	Jr	Sierra Canyon School	Northridge, CA
G	23	Kelli Hayes	6 ft 0 in (1.83 m)	Sr	Archbishop Mitty	San Jose, CA
G	24	Japreece Dean	5 ft 6 in (1.68 m)	Jr	Vista Ridge; Texas Tech	Austin, TX
F	25	Monique Billings	6 ft 4 in (1.93 m)	Sr	Santiago	Corona, CA
G	32	Chrissy Baird	6 ft 1 in (1.85 m)	RS Jr	Wheaton North	Wheaton, IL
F	33	Lauryn Miller	6 ft 1 in (1.85 m)	Fr	Kirkwood	Kirkwood, MO

Head coach

- Cori Close (UC Santa Barbara)

Assistant coach(es)

- Shannon Perry (Iowa)
- Jenny Huth (Colorado)
- Tony Newnan (UC Santa Barbara)

Legend

- (C) Team captain
- (S) Suspended
- (I) Ineligible
- (W) Walk-on
- Injured
- Current redshirt

Roster
Last update: November 1, 2024

== Schedule ==
Date time, TV	Rank^{#}	Opponent^{#}	Result	Record	Site (attendance) city, state
Exhibition
November 5, 2017*; 2:00 p.m.	No. 8	Vanguard	W 87–40		Pauley Pavilion (759); Los Angeles, CA
Non-conference regular season
November 10, 2017*; 7:00 p.m.	No. 8	San Jose State	W 129–69	1–0	Pauley Pavilion (1,437); Los Angeles, CA
November 12, 2017*; 2:00 p.m.	No. 8	Presbyterian	W 76–40	2–0	Pauley Pavilion (1,101); Los Angeles, CA
November 18, 2017*; 1:00 p.m., P12N	No. 8	No. 3 Baylor	W 82–68	3–0	Pauley Pavilion (3,912); Los Angeles, CA
November 21, 2017*; 7:30 p.m., ESPNU	No. 5	No. 1 Connecticut	L 60–78	3–1	Pauley Pavilion (9,263); Los Angeles, CA
November 24, 2017*; 1:15 p.m.	No. 5	vs. Kansas State; South Point Thanksgiving Shootout	W 64–55	4–1	South Point Arena (550); Las Vegas, NV
November 25, 2017*; 3:30 p.m.	No. 5	vs. Creighton; South Point Thanksgiving Shootout	W 72–63	5–1	South Point Arena (550); Las Vegas, NV
November 28, 2017*; 7:00 p.m.	No. 7	UC Riverside	W 68–48	6–1	Pauley Pavilion (1,890); Los Angeles, CA
December 3, 2017*; 1:30 p.m., P12N	No. 7	UC Santa Barbara	W 74–44	7–1	Pauley Pavilion (2,044); Los Angeles, CA
December 8, 2017*; 5:00 p.m., FSOK	No. 7	at Oklahoma State	L 72–87	7–2	Gallagher-Iba Arena (2,969); Stillwater, OK
December 17, 2017*; 10:00 a.m.	No. 11	at Seton Hall	W 77–68	8–2	Walsh Gymnasium (1,165); South Orange, NJ
December 20, 2017*; 4:00 p.m.	No. 11	at Fordham	W 67–30	9–2	Rose Hill Gymnasium (1,327); The Bronx, NY
Pac-12 regular season
December 29, 2017; 5:30 p.m., P12N	No. 11	at Stanford	L 65–76	9–3 (0–1)	Maples Pavilion (3,102); Stanford, CA
December 31, 2017; 11:00 a.m., P12N	No. 11	at No. 20 California	W 82–46	10–3 (1–1)	Haas Pavilion (2,570); Berkeley, CA
January 5, 2018; 6:00 p.m., P12N	No. 14	No. 16 Oregon State	W 84–49	11–3 (2–1)	Pauley Pavilion (1,986); Los Angeles, CA
January 7, 2018; 5:00 p.m., P12N	No. 14	No. 9 Oregon	L 61–70	11–4 (2–2)	Pauley Pavilion (7,190); Los Angeles, CA
January 12, 2018; 7:00 p.m., P12N	No. 14	at Utah	W 81–74	12–4 (3–2)	Jon M. Huntsman Center (3,281); Salt Lake City, UT
January 14, 2018; 3:00 p.m., P12N	No. 14	at Colorado	W 93–55	13–4 (4–2)	Coors Events Center (2,160); Boulder, CO
January 19, 2018; 6:00 p.m., P12N	No. 13	No. 21 California	W 60–52	14–4 (5–2)	Pauley Pavilion (2,704); Los Angeles, CA
January 21, 2018; 3:00 p.m., P12N	No. 13	Stanford	W 64–53	15–4 (6–2)	Pauley Pavilion (2,948); Los Angeles, CA
January 26, 2018; 7:00 p.m., P12N	No. 13	at Washington	W 86–69	16–4 (7–2)	Alaska Airlines Arena (1,688); Seattle, WA
January 28, 2018; 3:00 p.m., P12N	No. 13	at Washington State	W 79–71	17–4 (8–2)	Beasley Coliseum (1,093); Pullman, WA
February 2, 2018; 8:00 p.m., P12N	No. 9	USC; Rivalry	W 59–46	18–4 (9–2)	Pauley Pavilion (6,057); Los Angeles, CA
February 5, 2018; 6:00 p.m., P12N	No. 8	at USC; Rivalry	W 84–70	19–4 (10–2)	Galen Center (876); Los Angeles, CA
February 9, 2018; 8:00 p.m., P12N	No. 8	Arizona	W 69–46	20–4 (11–2)	Pauley Pavilion (1,883); Los Angeles, CA
February 11, 2018; 1:00 p.m., P12N	No. 8	No. 25 Arizona State	W 71–63	21–4 (12–2)	Pauley Pavilion (3,690); Los Angeles, CA
February 16, 2018; 8:00 p.m., P12N	No. 7	at No. 15 Oregon State	L 64–67 ^{OT}	21–5 (12–3)	Gill Coliseum (5,011); Corvallis, OR
February 19, 2018; 7:00 p.m., ESPN2	No. 10	at No. 8 Oregon	L 94–101 ^{OT}	21–6 (12–4)	Matthew Knight Arena (7,098); Eugene, OR
February 22, 2018; 8:00 p.m., P12N	No. 10	Colorado	W 73–67	22–6 (13–4)	Pauley Pavilion (902); Los Angeles, CA
February 24, 2018; 2:00 p.m.	No. 10	Utah	W 78–71 ^{OT}	23–6 (14–4)	Pauley Pavilion (3,866); Los Angeles, CA
Pac-12 women's tournament
March 2, 2018; 2:00 p.m., P12N	(4) No. 9	vs. (5) California; Quarterfinals	W 77–74	24–6	KeyArena (4,852); Seattle, WA
March 3, 2018; 6:00 p.m., P12N	(4) No. 9	vs. (1) No. 6 Oregon; Semifinals	L 62–65	24–7	KeyArena; Seattle, WA
NCAA women's tournament
March 17, 2018*; 12:30 p.m., ESPN2	(3 KC) No. 9	(14 KC) American; First round	W 71–60	25–7	Pauley Pavilion (2,304); Los Angeles, CA
March 19, 2018*; 6:00 p.m., ESPN2	(3 KC) No. 9	(11 KC) Creighton; Second round	W 86–64	26–7	Pauley Pavilion (1,860); Los Angeles, CA
March 23, 2018*; 6:00 p.m., ESPN2	(3 KC) No. 9	vs. (2 KC) No. 8 Texas; Sweet Sixteen	W 84–75	27–7	Sprint Center (4,280); Kansas City, MO
March 25, 2018*; 4:30 p.m., ESPN	(3 KC) No. 9	vs. (1 KC) No. 4 Mississippi State; Elite Eight	L 73–89	27–8	Sprint Center (4,089); Kansas City, MO
*Non-conference game. ^{#}Rankings from AP Poll. (#) Tournament seedings in parentheses. KC=Kansas City Region. All times are in Pacific.

== Rankings ==
Regular-season polls
Poll	Pre- season	Week 2	Week 3	Week 4	Week 5	Week 6	Week 7	Week 8	Week 9	Week 10	Week 11	Week 12	Week 13	Week 14	Week 15	Week 16	Week 17	Week 18	Week 19	Final
AP	8	8	5	7	7	11	11	14	14	14	13	13	9	8	7	10	9	9	9	N/A
Coaches	7	N/A	4T	7	7	12	12	12	14	14	13	12	9	7	7	10	9	9	9	7

Legend
	Increase in ranking
	Decrease in ranking
	No change
(RV)	Received votes
(NR)	Not ranked

== See also ==
- 2017–18 UCLA Bruins men's basketball team

== Awards ==
- January 29 – Jordin Canada named Pac-12 Player of the Week
- February 27 – Jordin Canada and Monique Billings named to the All-Pac-12 and All-Defensive teams. Michaela Onyenwere was named to the All-Freshman team and junior Kennedy Burke was honorable mention All-Pac-12 and honorable mention All-Defensive team.
- March 25 – Jordin Canada and Monique Billings named to the NCAA Tournament Kansas City Region All-Regional team
