= 2017–18 Colorado Buffaloes women's basketball team =

Intercollegiate basketball season

2017–18 Colorado Buffaloes women's basketball

Rocky Mountain Hoops Classic Champions
- Conference: Pac-12 Conference
- Record: 15–16 (5–13 Pac-12)
- Head coach: JR Payne (2nd season)
- Assistant coaches: Toriano Towns; Alex Earl; Shandrika Lee
- Home arena: Coors Events Center

2017–18 Pac-12 Conference women's basketball standings
	Conf.				Overall
Team	W		L	PCT	W		L	PCT
No. 6 Oregon †	16	–	2	.889	33	–	5	.868
No. 15 Stanford	14	–	3	.824	24	–	11	.686
No. 9 UCLA	14	–	4	.778	27	–	8	.771
No. 13 Oregon State	14	–	4	.778	26	–	8	.765
California	11	–	7	.611	21	–	11	.656
Arizona State	10	–	8	.556	22	–	13	.629
USC	9	–	9	.500	20	–	11	.645
Utah	8	–	10	.444	18	–	14	.563
Colorado	5	–	13	.278	15	–	16	.484
Washington State	3	–	14	.176	10	–	20	.333
Arizona	2	–	16	.111	6	–	24	.200
Washington	1	–	17	.056	7	–	23	.233
† 2018 Pac-12 Tournament winner As of 26 March 2018; Rankings from AP Poll

The 2017–18 Colorado Buffaloes women's basketball team represented the University of Colorado Boulder during the 2017–18 NCAA Division I women's basketball season. The Buffaloes, led by second year head coach JR Payne, played their home games at the Coors Events Center and were a member of the Pac-12 Conference. They finished the season 15–16, 5–13 in Pac-12 play to finish in ninth place. They defeated Utah in the first round of the Pac-12 women's tournament before losing to Oregon in the quarterfinals.

== Previous season ==
They finished the season 17–16, 5–13 in Pac-12 play to finish in a 4 way tie for ninth place. They lost in the first round of the Pac-12 women's tournament to Washington State. They were invited to the Women's National Invitation Tournament where defeat UNLV and South Dakota State in the first and second rounds before losing to Iowa in the third round.

== Roster ==
2017–18 Colorado Buffaloes women's basketball team
Players
Coaches

Pos.	#	Name	Height	Year	Previous school	Hometown
G	0	Quinessa Caylao-Do	5 ft 8 in (1.73 m)	So	Bellevue	Tacoma, WA
F	1	Janea Bunn	6 ft 3 in (1.91 m)	Jr	Spring Central; Midland College	Springfield, MA
G	2	Alexis Robinson	5 ft 10 in (1.78 m)	Jr	Paul G. Blazer	Ashland, KY
G	12	Peyton Carter	5 ft 8 in (1.73 m)	Fr	Monarch	Louisville, CO
G	13	Brecca Thomas	5 ft 5 in (1.65 m)	Sr	The Kinkaid School	Stafford, TX
G	14	Kennedy Leonard	5 ft 8 in (1.73 m)	Jr	Carroll	Southlake, TX
C	15	Zoe Correal	6 ft 4 in (1.93 m)	Sr	Salesian	San Francisco, CA
G/F	21	Mya Hollingshed	6 ft 4 in (1.93 m)	RS Fr	Bellaire	Houston, TX
G	23	Mathilde Diop	6 ft 2 in (1.88 m)	So	Lycee Gambetta; Arizona Western College	Dakar, Senegal
G	24	Aubrey Knight	6 ft 1 in (1.85 m)	Fr	Ventura	Ventura, CA
F	25	Annika Jank	6 ft 3 in (1.91 m)	Fr	Edina	Edina, MN
G	44	Sara Castro	5 ft 8 in (1.73 m)	Fr	IES Guanarteme	Las Palmas de Gran Canaria, Spain
C	50	Jamie Curtis	6 ft 7 in (2.01 m)	Jr	Rocklin; Sierra College	Rocklin, CA

Head coach

- JR Payne (Saint Mary's)

Assistant coach(es)

- Toriano Towns (Saint Mary's)
- Alex Earl (Arizona State)
- Shandrika Lee (Pepperdine)

Legend

- (C) Team captain
- (S) Suspended
- (I) Ineligible
- (W) Walk-on
- Injured
- Current redshirt

Roster
Last update: February 24, 2018

== Schedule ==
Date time, TV	Rank^{#}	Opponent^{#}	Result	Record	Site (attendance) city, state
Exhibition
11/04/2017*; 2:00 pm		Colorado Christian	W 90–55		Coors Events Center (611); Boulder, CO
Non-conference regular season
11/10/2017*; 5:00 pm		at Samford	W 71–60	1–0	Pete Hanna Center (381); Birmingham, AL
11/12/2017*; 12:00 pm		at North Carolina	L 80–87 ^{OT}	1–1	Carmichael Arena (2,181); Chapel Hill, NC
11/15/2017*; 7:00 pm		Florida Atlantic	W 76–69	2–1	Coors Events Center (1,503); Boulder, CO
11/18/2017*; 1:00 pm		Miami (FL)	W 67–61	3–1	Coors Events Center (1,450); Boulder, CO
11/24/2017*; 12:00 pm		Mississippi Valley State; Rocky Mountain Hoops Classic semifinals	W 85–48	4–1	Coors Events Center (1,314); Boulder, CO
11/25/2017*; 2:30 pm		George Mason; Rocky Mountain Hoops Classic championship	W 76–61	5–1	Coors Events Center (1,441); Boulder, CO
11/29/2017*; 7:00 pm		North Dakota State	W 108–59	6–1	Coors Events Center (1,250); Boulder, CO
12/06/2017*; 7:00 pm		at Colorado State	W 70–67	7–1	Moby Arena (1,461); Fort Collins, CO
12/11/2017*; 7:00 pm		Dartmouth	L 75–81	7–2	Coors Events Center (1,651); Boulder, CO
12/15/2017*; 7:00 pm		at Air Force	W 68–43	8–2	Clune Arena (287); Colorado Springs, CO
12/21/2017*; 7:00 pm		Westminster (MO)	W 106–47	9–2	Coors Events Center (1,383); Boulder, CO
Pac-12 regular season
12/29/2017; 7:00 pm, P12N		Arizona State	L 47–72	9–3 (0–1)	Coors Events Center (1,860); Boulder, CO
12/31/2017; 1:00 pm		Arizona	W 79–60	10–3 (1–1)	Coors Events Center (1,526); Boulder, CO
01/05/2018; 9:00 pm, P12N		at Washington State	L 75–89	10–4 (1–2)	Beasley Coliseum (679); Pullman, WA
01/07/2018; 3:00 pm		at Washington	W 66–61	11–4 (2–2)	Alaska Airlines Arena (2,141); Seattle, WA
01/12/2018; 6:00 pm, P12N		USC	L 51–86	11–5 (2–3)	Coors Events Center (1,533); Boulder, CO
01/14/2018; 4:00 pm, P12N		No. 14 UCLA	L 55–89	11–6 (2–4)	Coors Events Center (2,160); Boulder, CO
01/19/2018; 6:00 pm, P12N		at Arizona	L 63–72	11–7 (2–5)	McKale Center (1,426); Tucson, AZ
01/21/2018; 2:00 pm, P12N		at No. 22 Arizona State	L 59–73	11–8 (2–6)	Wells Fargo Arena (2,008); Tempe, AZ
01/26/2018; 8:00 pm, P12N		No. 7 Oregon	L 55–74	11–9 (2–7)	Coors Events Center (1,525); Boulder, CO
01/28/2018; 2:00 pm, P12N		No. 17 Oregon State	L 51–86	11–10 (2–8)	Coors Events Center (3,781); Boulder, CO
02/01/2018; 7:00 pm, P12N		at Utah	W 69–65	12–10 (3–8)	Jon M. Huntsman Center (1,812); Salt Lake City, UT
02/03/2018; 12:00 pm, P12N		Utah	L 74–78	12–11 (3–9)	Coors Events Center (1,591); Boulder, CO
02/09/2018; 8:00 pm, P12N		at California	L 76–78	12–12 (3–10)	Haas Pavilion (1,774); Berkeley, CA
02/11/2018; 4:00 pm, P12N		at No. 17 Stanford	L 66–78	12–13 (3–11)	Maples Pavilion (3,838); Stanford, CA
02/16/2018; 7:00 pm		Washington	W 76–56	13–13 (4–11)	Coors Events Center (1,743); Boulder, CO
02/18/2018; 12:00 pm, P12N		Washington State	W 72–69	14–13 (5–11)	Coors Events Center (3,423); Boulder, CO
02/22/2018; 9:00 pm, P12N		at No. 10 UCLA	L 55–89	14–14 (5–12)	Pauley Pavilion (902); Los Angeles, CA
02/24/2018; 3:00 pm		at USC	L 53–65	14–15 (5–13)	Galen Center (2,813); Los Angeles, CA
Pac-12 Women's Tournament
03/01/2018; 12:30 pm, P12N	(9)	vs. (8) Utah; First Round	W 66–56	15–15	KeyArena; Seattle, WA
03/02/2018; 12:30 pm, P12N	(9)	vs. (1) No. 6 Oregon; Quarterfinals	L 47–84	15–16	KeyArena; Seattle, WA
*Non-conference game. ^{#}Rankings from AP Poll. (#) Tournament seedings in parentheses. All times are in Mountain Time.

== Rankings ==
2017–18 NCAA Division I women's basketball rankings

Regular season polls
Poll	Pre- Season	Week 2	Week 3	Week 4	Week 5	Week 6	Week 7	Week 8	Week 9	Week 10	Week 11	Week 12	Week 13	Week 14	Week 15	Week 16	Week 17	Week 18	Week 19	Final
AP																				N/A
Coaches																				

Legend
	Increase in ranking
	Decrease in ranking
	No change
(RV)	Received votes
(NR)	Not ranked
