= 2017–18 California Golden Bears women's basketball team =

Intercollegiate basketball season

2017–18 California Golden Bears women's basketball

NCAA Women's Tournament, first round
- Conference: Pac-12 Conference
- Record: 21–11 (11–7 Pac-12)
- Head coach: Lindsay Gottlieb (7th season)
- Assistant coaches: Charmin Smith; Kai Felton; Wendale Farrow
- Home arena: Haas Pavilion

2017–18 Pac-12 Conference women's basketball standings
	Conf.				Overall
Team	W		L	PCT	W		L	PCT
No. 6 Oregon †	16	–	2	.889	33	–	5	.868
No. 15 Stanford	14	–	3	.824	24	–	11	.686
No. 9 UCLA	14	–	4	.778	27	–	8	.771
No. 13 Oregon State	14	–	4	.778	26	–	8	.765
California	11	–	7	.611	21	–	11	.656
Arizona State	10	–	8	.556	22	–	13	.629
USC	9	–	9	.500	20	–	11	.645
Utah	8	–	10	.444	18	–	14	.563
Colorado	5	–	13	.278	15	–	16	.484
Washington State	3	–	14	.176	10	–	20	.333
Arizona	2	–	16	.111	6	–	24	.200
Washington	1	–	17	.056	7	–	23	.233
† 2018 Pac-12 Tournament winner As of 26 March 2018; Rankings from AP Poll

The 2017–18 California Golden Bears women's basketball team represented University of California, Berkeley during the 2017–18 NCAA Division I women's basketball season. The Golden Bears, led by seventh year head coach Lindsay Gottlieb, played their home games at the Haas Pavilion and were members of the Pac-12 Conference. They finished the season 21–11, 11–7 in Pac-12 play to finish in fifth place. They advanced to the quarterfinals of the Pac-12 women's tournament where they lost to UCLA. They received at-large bid to the NCAA women's tournament, where they were upset by Virginia in the first round.

== Roster ==
2017–18 California Golden Bears women's basketball team
Players
Coaches

Pos.	#	Name	Height	Year	Previous school	Hometown
G	1	Asha Thomas	5 ft 4 in (1.63 m)	Jr	Bishop O'Dowd	Oakland, CA
F	3	Mikayla Cowling	6 ft 2 in (1.88 m)	Sr	Saint Mary's College (HS)	Benicia, CA
F	4	Alaysia Styles	6 ft 3 in (1.91 m)	Fr	La Jolla Country Day School	San Diego, CA
C	5	Chen Yue	6 ft 7 in (2.01 m)	Jr	Tsinghua University	Beijing, China
G	11	Sara Anastasieska	5 ft 11 in (1.8 m)	RS So	Monte Sant Angelo Mercy; UTSA	Sydney, Australia
F	12	Penina Davidson	6 ft 3 in (1.91 m)	Sr	Rangitoto College	Auckland, New Zealand
G	14	Kianna Smith	6 ft 0 in (1.83 m)	Fr	Troy	Moreno Valley, CA
F	20	MeAne Mosley	5 ft 11 in (1.8 m)	Jr	Saint Mary's College HS	Oakland, CA
G	21	Mi'Cole Cayton	5 ft 9 in (1.75 m)	So	Saint Mary's College HS	Stockton, CA
G	22	Archer Olson	6 ft 0 in (1.83 m)	Fr	Henry M. Gunn	Palo Alto, CA
F	30	Celeste West	6 ft 4 in (1.93 m)	So	Garces Memorial	Bakersfield, CA
F	31	Kristine Anigwe	6 ft 4 in (1.93 m)	Jr	Desert Vista	Phoenix, AZ
G	33	Jaelyn Brown	6 ft 1 in (1.85 m)	So	Vista Murrieta	Murrieta, CA

Head coach

- Lindsay Gottlieb (Brown)

Assistant coach(es)

- Charmin Smith (Stanford)
- Kai Felton (Randolph–Macon)
- Wendale Farrow (Eastern Michigan)

Legend

- (C) Team captain
- (S) Suspended
- (I) Ineligible
- (W) Walk-on
- Injured
- Current redshirt

Roster
Last update: November 17, 2017

== Schedule ==
Date time, TV	Rank^{#}	Opponent^{#}	Result	Record	Site (attendance) city, state
Exhibition
11/02/2017*; 7:00 pm	No. 20	Vanguard	W 71–57		Haas Pavilion; Berkeley, CA
Non-conference regular season
11/10/2017*; 5:00 pm	No. 20	Saint Mary's	W 87–80	1–0	Haas Pavilion (2,768); Berkeley, CA
11/17/2017*; 4:00 pm, SNY/ESPN3	No. 20	at No. 1 Connecticut	L 47–82	1–1	Harry A. Gampel Pavilion (8,103); Storrs, CT
11/19/2017*; 9:00 am	No. 20	at Brown	W 89–79	2–1	Pizzitola Sports Center (361); Providence, RI
11/24/2017*; 2:00 pm	No. 21	Manhattan; Cal Classic semifinals	W 87–66	3–1	Haas Pavilion (1,723); Berkeley, CA
11/25/2017*; 2:00 pm	No. 21	No. 23 Missouri; Cal Classic championship	L 52–55	3–2	Haas Pavilion (2,011); Berkeley, CA
11/30/2017*; 11:30 am	No. 24	Seattle	W 87–67	4–2	Haas Pavilion (4,362); Berkeley, CA
12/02/2017*; 2:00 pm	No. 24	at Santa Clara	W 79–41	5–2	Leavey Center (517); Santa Clara, CA
12/07/2017*; 7:00 pm	No. 25	San Diego	W 89–64	6–2	Haas Pavilion (1,126); Berkeley, CA
12/10/2017*; 2:00 pm	No. 25	at Pacific	W 92–85	7–2	Alex G. Spanos Center (479); Stockton, CA
12/16/2017*; 5:00 pm, P12N	No. 24	BYU	W 70–45	8–2	Haas Pavilion (1,461); Berkeley, CA
12/21/2017*; 9:00 am, SECN	No. 24	at Kentucky	W 62–52	9–2	Memorial Coliseum (4,753); Lexington, KY
Pac-12 regular season
12/29/2017; 6:00 pm	No. 20	USC	W 76–64	10–2 (1–0)	Haas Pavilion (2,217); Berkeley, CA
12/31/2017; 11:00 am, P12N	No. 20	No. 11 UCLA	L 46–82	10–3 (1–1)	Haas Pavilion (2,570); Berkeley, CA
01/05/2018; 7:00 pm, P12N	No. 23	at No. 25 Arizona State	L 71–80	10–4 (1–2)	Wells Fargo Arena (2,239); Tempe, AZ
01/07/2018; 11:00 am, P12N	No. 23	at Arizona	W 53–51	11–4 (2–2)	McKale Center (1,322); Tucson, AZ
01/12/2018; 8:00 pm, P12N	No. 24	Washington	W 69–60	12–4 (3–2)	Haas Pavilion (1,478); Berkeley, CA
01/14/2018; 1:00 pm, P12N	No. 24	Washington State	W 66–60	13–4 (4–2)	Haas Pavilion (1,758); Berkeley, CA
01/19/2018; 6:00 pm, P12N	No. 21	at No. 13 UCLA	L 52–60	13–5 (4–3)	Pauley Pavilion (2,704); Los Angeles, CA
01/21/2018; 1:00 pm, P12N	No. 21	at USC	W 62–59	14–5 (5–3)	Galen Center (1,728); Los Angeles, CA
01/26/2018; 7:00 pm	No. 23	Arizona	W 63–39	15–5 (6–3)	Haas Pavilion (2,463); Berkeley, CA
01/28/2018; 3:00 pm, P12N	No. 23	No. 25 Arizona State	L 42–57	15–6 (6–4)	Haas Pavilion (2,521); Berkeley, CA
02/02/2018; 8:00 pm, P12N	No. 25	at No. 6 Oregon	L 54–91	15–7 (6–5)	Matthew Knight Arena (3,670); Eugene, OR
02/04/2018; 1:00 pm, P12N	No. 25	at No. 16 Oregon State	L 48–68	15–8 (6–6)	Gill Coliseum (3,706); Corvallis, OR
02/09/2018; 7:00 pm, P12N		Colorado	W 78–76	16–8 (7–6)	Haas Pavilion (1,774); Berkeley, CA
02/11/2018; 2:00 pm		Utah	W 84–73	17–8 (8–6)	Haas Pavilion (2,507); Berkeley, CA
02/15/2018; 7:00 pm, P12N		at No. 14 Stanford	L 69–74	17–9 (8–7)	Maples Pavilion (3,074); Stanford, CA
02/17/2018; 2:30 pm, P12N		No. 14 Stanford	W 78–66	18–9 (9–7)	Haas Pavilion (4,211); Berkeley, CA
02/23/2018; 7:00 pm		at Washington State	W 67–54	19–9 (10–7)	Beasley Coliseum (781); Pullman, WA
02/25/2018; 3:00 pm, P12N		at Washington	W 83–67	20–9 (11–7)	Alaska Airlines Arena (2,354); Seattle, WA
Pac-12 Women's Tournament
03/01/2018; 2:00 pm, P12N	(5)	vs. (12) Washington; First Round	W 71–68	21–9	KeyArena (3,532); Seattle, WA
03/02/2018; 2:00 pm, P12N	(5)	vs. (4) No. 9 UCLA; Quarterfinals	L 74–77	21–10	KeyArena (4,852); Seattle, WA
NCAA Women's Tournament
03/16/2018*; 2:00 pm, ESPN2	(7 A)	vs. (10 A) Virginia; First Round	L 62–68	21–11	Colonial Life Arena; Columbia, SC
*Non-conference game. ^{#}Rankings from AP Poll. (#) Tournament seedings in parentheses. A=Albany Region. All times are in Pacific Time.

== Rankings ==
Regular season polls
Poll	Pre- Season	Week 2	Week 3	Week 4	Week 5	Week 6	Week 7	Week 8	Week 9	Week 10	Week 11	Week 12	Week 13	Week 14	Week 15	Week 16	Week 17	Week 18	Week 19	Final
AP	20	20	21	24	25	24	24	20	23	24	21	23	25	RV	RV	RV	RV	RV	RV	N/A
Coaches	25т	N/A	23	RV	RV	RV	RV	25	RV	RV	RV	RV	NR	NR	NR	NR	NR	NR	NR	NR

Legend
	Increase in ranking
	Decrease in ranking
	No change
(RV)	Received votes
(NR)	Not ranked

== See also ==
2017–18 California Golden Bears men's basketball team
