= 2017–18 Oregon Ducks women's basketball team =

Intercollegiate basketball season

2017–18 Oregon Ducks women's basketball

Pac-12 Tournament champions Pac-12 regular season champions

NCAA tournament, Elite Eight
- Conference: Pac-12 Conference

Ranking
- Coaches: No. 5
- AP: No. 6
- Record: 33–5 (16–2 Pac-12)
- Head coach: Kelly Graves (4th season)
- Assistant coaches: Mark Campbell; Jodie Berry; Xavi López
- Home arena: Matthew Knight Arena

2017–18 Pac-12 Conference women's basketball standings
	Conf.				Overall
Team	W		L	PCT	W		L	PCT
No. 6 Oregon †	16	–	2	.889	33	–	5	.868
No. 15 Stanford	14	–	3	.824	24	–	11	.686
No. 9 UCLA	14	–	4	.778	27	–	8	.771
No. 13 Oregon State	14	–	4	.778	26	–	8	.765
California	11	–	7	.611	21	–	11	.656
Arizona State	10	–	8	.556	22	–	13	.629
USC	9	–	9	.500	20	–	11	.645
Utah	8	–	10	.444	18	–	14	.563
Colorado	5	–	13	.278	15	–	16	.484
Washington State	3	–	14	.176	10	–	20	.333
Arizona	2	–	16	.111	6	–	24	.200
Washington	1	–	17	.056	7	–	23	.233
† 2018 Pac-12 Tournament winner As of 26 March 2018; Rankings from AP Poll

The 2017–18 Oregon Ducks women's basketball team represented the University of Oregon during the 2017–18 NCAA Division I women's basketball season. The Ducks, led by fourth-year head coach Kelly Graves, played their games at the Matthew Knight Arena as members of the Pac-12 Conference. They finished the season 33–5, 16–2 in Pac-12 play to win the Pac-12 regular season title. They also won the Pac-12 women's tournament for the first time in school history and earned an automatic bid to the NCAA women's tournament, where they defeated Seattle and Minnesota in the first and second rounds, Central Michigan in the sweet sixteen before falling to Notre Dame in the elite eight. With 33 wins, they finished with the most wins in school history.

== Offseason ==
=== Departures ===
Name	Number	Pos.	Height	Year	Hometown	Notes
Jayde Woods	11	G	6'1"	Freshman	Yorba Linda, CA	Transferred at midseason to TCU
Megan Trinder	12	G	5'7"	Junior (redshirt)	Hollywell, Qld, Australia	Graduated in August 2017; chose to enter the workforce
Mar'Shay Moore	13	G	5'8"	Senior	Vancouver, WA	Graduated
Jacinta Vandenberg	15	F	6'5"	Senior (redshirt)	Melbourne, Australia	Graduated

In addition to the departing players, assistant Nicole Powell left after the 2016–17 season to become the head coach at Grand Canyon, located in her hometown of Phoenix.

=== Incoming transfer ===
Name	Position	Height	Year	Hometown	Previous School	Years Remaining	Date Eligible
Erin Boley	F	6'2"	Sophomore	Hodgenville, KY	Notre Dame	3	Oct. 1, 2018

== Roster ==
2017–18 Oregon Ducks women's basketball team
Players
Coaches

Pos.	#	Name	Height	Year	Previous school	Hometown
F	0	Satou Sabally	6 ft 4 in (1.93 m)	Fr	Rotteck Gymnasium	Berlin, Germany
G	2	Morgan Yaeger (injured) (redshirt)	5 ft 9 in (1.75 m)	So	St. John's School	Adelaide, Australia
G	3	Justine Hall	5 ft 10 in (1.78 m)	RS Sr	Regis Jesuit HS; Purdue	Denver, CO
G	5	Maite Cazorla	5 ft 10 in (1.78 m)	Jr	Segle XXI	Las Palmas, Spain
G	10	Lexi Bando	5 ft 9 in (1.75 m)	Sr	Willamette HS	Eugene, OR
F	14	Lydia Giomi	6 ft 6 in (1.98 m)	RS Fr	West Seattle HS	Seattle, WA
G	15	Anneli Maley	6 ft 2 in (1.88 m)	Fr	Box Hill Senior College	Melbourne, Australia
G	20	Sabrina Ionescu	5 ft 11 in (1.8 m)	So	Miramonte HS	Walnut Creek, CA
F	21	Erin Boley (redshirt)	6 ft 2 in (1.88 m)	So	Elizabethtown HS; Notre Dame	Hodgenville, KY
F	24	Ruthy Hebard	6 ft 4 in (1.93 m)	So	West Valley HS	Fairbanks, AK
G	31	Aina Ayuso	5 ft 9 in (1.75 m)	Fr	Segle XXI	Sant Just Desvern, Spain
F	32	Oti Gildon	6 ft 1 in (1.85 m)	Jr	Gonzaga Prep	Spokane, WA
F	44	Mallory McGwire	6 ft 5 in (1.96 m)	So	Reno HS	Reno, NV
F	52	Sierra Campisano	6 ft 3 in (1.91 m)	So	Torrey Pines HS	San Diego, CA

Head coach

- Kelly Graves (New Mexico)

Assistant coach(es)

- Mark Campbell (Hawaiʻi)
- Jodie Berry (Western Washington)
- Xavi López (Point Loma)

Legend

- (C) Team captain
- (S) Suspended
- (I) Ineligible
- (W) Walk-on
- Injured
- Current redshirt

Roster

== Schedule ==
Date time, TV	Rank^{#}	Opponent^{#}	Result	Record	Site (attendance) city, state
Exhibition
10/28/2017*; 9:00 am	No. 11	Portland State; Charity Exhibition for Oregon Wildfire Fund	W 88–60		Matthew Knight Arena; Eugene, OR
11/05/2017*; 2:00 pm	No. 11	Westmont	W 71–32		Matthew Knight Arena (2,082); Eugene, OR
Non-conference regular season
11/10/2017*; 5:00 pm	No. 11	Cal State Northridge; Preseason WNIT First Round	W 91–43	1–0	Matthew Knight Arena (2,646); Eugene, OR
11/12/2017*; 2:00 pm	No. 11	Drake; Preseason WNIT Quarterfinals	W 110–77	2–0	Matthew Knight Arena (2,311); Eugene, OR
11/16/2017*; 5:00 pm	No. 10	at No. 19 Texas A&M; Preseason WNIT Semifinals	W 83–68	3–0	Reed Arena (3,315); College Station, TX
11/19/2017*; 12:00 pm, CBSSN	No. 10	at No. 5 Louisville; Preseason WNIT Championship	L 61–74	3–1	KFC Yum! Center (6,162); Louisville, KY
11/21/2017*; 6:00 pm	No. 10	Eastern Washington	W 81–40	4–1	Matthew Knight Arena (2,234); Eugene, OR
11/25/2017*; 2:30 pm, P12N	No. 10	Oklahoma; Nike PK 80 Phil Knight Invitational	W 92–74	5–1	Matthew Knight Arena (6,033); Eugene, OR
11/28/2017*; 6:00 pm	No. 10	Hampton	W 87–45	6–1	Matthew Knight Arena (2,142); Eugene, OR
12/02/2017*; 2:00 pm	No. 10	Weber State	W 114–87	7–1	Matthew Knight Arena (2,506); Eugene, OR
12/09/2017*; 2:00 pm	No. 9	Southern Utah	W 98–38	8–1	Matthew Knight Arena (2,565); Eugene, OR
12/13/2017*; 4:00 pm, SECN	No. 9	at No. 5 Mississippi State	L 79–90	8–2	Humphrey Coliseum (5,445); Starkville, MS
12/17/2017*; 1:00 pm, P12N	No. 9	Ole Miss	W 90–46	9–2	Matthew Knight Arena (2,683); Eugene, OR
12/21/2017*; 12:00 pm	No. 10	vs. No. 19 Texas A&M; Duel in the Desert, Desert Division	W 84–62	10–2	Cox Pavilion (652); Paradise, NV
12/22/2017*; 12:00 pm	No. 10	vs. Hawaiʻi; Duel in the Desert, Desert Division	W 85–44	11–2	Cox Pavilion; Paradise, NV
Pac-12 regular season
12/29/2017; 3:00 pm	No. 10	Washington State	W 89–56	12–2 (1–0)	Matthew Knight Arena (3,476); Eugene, OR
12/31/2017; 1:00 pm, P12N	No. 10	Washington	W 94–83	13–2 (2–0)	Matthew Knight Arena (3,322); Eugene, OR
01/05/2018; 8:00 pm, P12N	No. 9	at USC	W 70–66	14–2 (3–0)	Galen Center (670); Los Angeles, CA
01/07/2018; 5:00 pm, P12N	No. 9	at No. 14 UCLA	W 70–61	15–2 (4–0)	Pauley Pavilion (7,190); Los Angeles, CA
01/12/2018; 8:00 pm, P12N	No. 8	Arizona	W 62–44	16–2 (5–0)	Matthew Knight Arena (3,466); Eugene, OR
01/14/2018; 5:00 pm, P12N	No. 8	No. 18 Arizona State	W 74–64	17–2 (6–0)	Matthew Knight Arena (4,416); Eugene, OR
01/19/2018; 8:00 pm, P12N	No. 7	at No. 18 Oregon State; Civil War	L 79–85 ^{OT}	17–3 (6–1)	Gill Coliseum (6,704); Corvallis, OR
01/21/2018; 5:00 pm, P12N	No. 7	No. 18 Oregon State; Civil War	W 75–63	18–3 (7–1)	Matthew Knight Arena (7,249); Eugene, OR
01/26/2018; 7:00 pm, P12N	No. 7	at Colorado	W 74–55	19–3 (8–1)	Coors Events Center (1,525); Boulder, CO
01/28/2018; 11:00 am, P12N	No. 7	at Utah	W 84–68	20–3 (9–1)	Jon M. Huntsman Center (1,728); Salt Lake City, UT
02/02/2018; 8:00 pm, P12N	No. 6	No. 25 California	W 91–54	21–3 (10–1)	Matthew Knight Arena (3,670); Eugene, OR
02/04/2018; 12:00 pm, ESPN2	No. 6	No. 24 Stanford	L 65–78	21–4 (10–2)	Matthew Knight Arena (5,126); Eugene, OR
02/09/2018; 8:00 pm, P12N	No. 9	at Washington	W 76–63	22–4 (11–2)	Alaska Airlines Arena (2,177); Seattle, WA
02/11/2018; 1:00 pm, P12N	No. 9	at Washington State	W 90–79	23–4 (12–2)	Beasley Coliseum (1,122); Pullman, WA
02/16/2018; 6:00 pm, P12N	No. 9	USC	W 80–74 ^{2OT}	24–4 (13–2)	Matthew Knight Arena (5,283); Eugene, OR
02/18/2018; 7:00 pm, ESPN2	No. 8	No. 10 UCLA	W 101–94 ^{OT}	25–4 (14–2)	Matthew Knight Arena (7,098); Eugene, OR
02/23/2018; 5:00 pm, P12N	No. 8	at Arizona State	W 57–44	26–4 (15–2)	Wells Fargo Arena (3,446); Tempe, AZ
02/25/2018; 11:00 am, P12N	No. 8	at Arizona	W 74–61	27–4 (16–2)	McKale Center (1,674); Tucson, AZ
Pac-12 Women's Tournament
03/02/2018; 11:30 am, P12N	(1) No. 6	vs. (9) Colorado; Quarterfinals	W 84–47	28–4	KeyArena (4,852); Seattle, WA
03/03/2018; 6:00 pm, P12N	(1) No. 6	vs. (4) No. 9 UCLA; Semifinals	W 65–62	29–4	KeyArena (6,889); Seattle, WA
03/04/2018; 6:00 pm, ESPN2	(1) No. 6	vs. (2) No. 16 Stanford; Championship Game	W 77–57	30–4	KeyArena (5,387); Seattle, WA
NCAA Women's Tournament
03/16/2018*; 4:30 pm, ESPN2	(2 S) No. 6	(15 S) Seattle; First Round	W 88–45	31–4	Matthew Knight Arena (7,040); Eugene, OR
03/18/2018*; 7:30 pm, ESPN2	(2 S) No. 6	(10 S) Minnesota; Second Round	W 101–73	32–4	Matthew Knight Arena (7,576); Eugene, OR
03/24/2018*; 3:00 pm, ESPN	(2 S) No. 6	vs. (11 S) Central Michigan; Sweet Sixteen	W 83–69	33–4	Spokane Arena (5,084); Spokane, WA
03/26/2018*; 6:00 pm, ESPN	(2 S) No. 6	vs. (1 S) No. 5 Notre Dame; Elite Eight	L 74–84	33–5	Spokane Arena (5,226); Spokane, WA
*Non-conference game. ^{#}Rankings from AP Poll. (#) Tournament seedings in parentheses. S=Spokane Region. All times are in Pacific Time.

== Rankings ==
2017–18 NCAA Division I women's basketball rankings

Regular season polls
Poll	Pre- Season	Week 2	Week 3	Week 4	Week 5	Week 6	Week 7	Week 8	Week 9	Week 10	Week 11	Week 12	Week 13	Week 14	Week 15	Week 16	Week 17	Week 18	Week 19	Final
AP	11	10	10	10	9	9	10	10	9	8	7	7	6	9	9	8	6	6	6	N/A
Coaches	11	N/A	10	10	9	9	10	10	9	9	6	9	7	10	10	7	6	5	5	5

Legend
	Increase in ranking
	Decrease in ranking
	Not ranked previous week
(RV)	Received Votes

== See also ==
- 2017–18 Oregon Ducks men's basketball team
