= 2017–18 Arizona Wildcats women's basketball team =

Intercollegiate basketball season

2017–18 Arizona Wildcats women's basketball
- Conference: Pac-12 Conference
- Record: 6–24 (2–16 Pac-12)
- Head coach: Adia Barnes (2nd season)
- Assistant coaches: Sunny Smallwood; Salvo Coppa; Kelly Rae Finley
- Home arena: McKale Center

2017–18 Pac-12 Conference women's basketball standings
	Conf.				Overall
Team	W		L	PCT	W		L	PCT
No. 6 Oregon †	16	–	2	.889	33	–	5	.868
No. 15 Stanford	14	–	3	.824	24	–	11	.686
No. 9 UCLA	14	–	4	.778	27	–	8	.771
No. 13 Oregon State	14	–	4	.778	26	–	8	.765
California	11	–	7	.611	21	–	11	.656
Arizona State	10	–	8	.556	22	–	13	.629
USC	9	–	9	.500	20	–	11	.645
Utah	8	–	10	.444	18	–	14	.563
Colorado	5	–	13	.278	15	–	16	.484
Washington State	3	–	14	.176	10	–	20	.333
Arizona	2	–	16	.111	6	–	24	.200
Washington	1	–	17	.056	7	–	23	.233
† 2018 Pac-12 Tournament winner As of 26 March 2018; Rankings from AP Poll

The 2017–18 Arizona Wildcats women's basketball team represented University of Arizona during the 2017–18 NCAA Division I women's basketball season. The Wildcats, led by second-year head coach Adia Barnes, played their games at the McKale Center and were members of the Pac-12 Conference. They finished the season 6–24, 2–16 in Pac-12 play to finish in eleventh place. They lost in the first round of the Pac-12 women's basketball tournament to Arizona State.

== Off-season ==
=== Departures ===
Name	Pos.	Height	Year	Hometown	Reason for departure
Malena Washington	G	5'6"	Senior	Beaumont, TX	Graduated
LaBrittney Jones	F	6'1"	Senior	Cedar Hill, TX	Graduated
Dejza James	F	6'1"	Senior	Elk Grove, CA	Graduated
Lauren Evans	F	5'11"	RS Senior	Phoenix, AZ	Graduated
Farrin Bell	G	6'0"	RS Senior	Richardson, TX	Graduated

=== Incoming transfers ===
Name	Pos.	Height	Weight	Year	Hometown	Notes
Kat Wright	F	6'0"		RS Senior	Woodland Hills, CA	Graduate transfer from Florida Atlantic. She is expected to eligible to play immediately for the 2017–18 season per NCAA graduate transfer rules.
Tee Tee Starks	G	5'9"		RS Sophomore	Brooklyn Park, MN	Transfer from Iowa State. Will sit out 2017–18 under NCAA transfer rules. Will have 3 years eligibility to play.
Aari McDonald	G	5'7"		Sophomore	Fresno, CA	Transfer from Washington. Will sit out 2017–18 under NCAA transfer rules. Will have 3 years eligibility to play.
Dominique McBryde	F	6'2"		Junior	Bedford, IN	Transfer from Purdue. Will sit out 2017–18 under NCAA transfer rules. Will have 2 years eligibility to play.

=== Recruits ===
College recruiting information
Name	Hometown	School	Height	Weight	Commit date
Sam Thomas; G	Las Vegas, NV	Centennial HS	6 ft 7 in (2.01 m)	N/A	
Sam Thomas; G	Recruit ratings: Scout: Rivals: 247Sports: ESPN: (93)				
Samantha Fatkin; G	Snohomish, WA	Glacier Peak HS	5 ft 10 in (1.78 m)	N/A	
Samantha Fatkin; G	Recruit ratings: Scout: Rivals: 247Sports: ESPN: (90)				
Marlee Kyles; P	Elgin, IL	Larkin HS	5 ft 7 in (1.70 m)	N/A	
Marlee Kyles; P	Recruit ratings: Scout: Rivals: 247Sports: ESPN: (90)				
Kiana Chew; F	Palm Harbor, FL	Palm Harbor University HS	6 ft 3 in (1.91 m)	N/A	
Kiana Chew; F	Recruit ratings: Scout: Rivals: 247Sports: ESPN: (88)				
Overall recruit ranking:
Note: In many cases, Scout, Rivals, 247Sports, On3, and ESPN may conflict in their listings of height and weight.; In these cases, the average was taken. ESPN grades are on a 100-point scale.; Sources: "2017 Player Commits". ESPN. Archived from the original on June 29, 2016.

==== 2018 recruiting class ====
College recruiting information (2018)
Name	Hometown	School	Height	Weight	Commit date
Cate Reese; F	Cypress, TX	Cypress Woods HS	6 ft 2 in (1.88 m)	N/A	
Cate Reese; F	Recruit ratings: Scout: Rivals: 247Sports: ESPN: (98)				
Semaj Smith; PG	Long Beach, CA	St. Anthony HS	6 ft 5 in (1.96 m)	N/A	
Semaj Smith; PG	Recruit ratings: Scout: Rivals: 247Sports: ESPN: (96)				
Valeria Trucco; F/C	Torino, ITL		6 ft 3 in (1.91 m)	N/A	
Valeria Trucco; F/C	Recruit ratings: Scout: Rivals: 247Sports: ESPN: (90)				
Shalyse Smith; G/F	Tacoma, WA	Bellarmine Prep	6 ft 1 in (1.85 m)	N/A	
Shalyse Smith; G/F	Recruit ratings: Scout: Rivals: 247Sports: ESPN: (90)				
Bryce Nixon; PG	Phoenix, AZ	Acardia HS	5 ft 10 in (1.78 m)	N/A	
Bryce Nixon; PG	Recruit ratings: Scout: Rivals: 247Sports: ESPN: (89)				
Overall recruit ranking:
Note: In many cases, Scout, Rivals, 247Sports, On3, and ESPN may conflict in their listings of height and weight.; In these cases, the average was taken. ESPN grades are on a 100-point scale.; Sources: "2018 Player Commits". ESPN. Archived from the original on June 29, 2016.

== Roster ==
2017–18 Arizona Wildcats women's basketball team
Players
Coaches

Pos.	#	Name	Height	Year	Previous school	Hometown
G	2	Aari McDonald (redshirt)	5 ft 7 in (1.7 m)	So	Brookside Christian HS/Washington	Fresno, CA
G	4	Lucia Alonso	5 ft 7 in (1.7 m)	So	Aron Leon Cuna Del Parlamentarismo	León, Spain
F	5	Sammy Fatkin	6 ft 0 in (1.83 m)	Fr	Glacier Peak HS	Snohomish, WA
G	10	Tee Tee Starks (redshirt)	5 ft 9 in (1.75 m)	RS So	Hopkins HS/Iowa State	Brooklyn Park, MN
F	11	Kat Wright	6 ft 0 in (1.83 m)	RS Sr	Notre Dame HS/Florida Atlantic	Woodland Hills, CA
G	13	Marlee Kyles	5 ft 7 in (1.7 m)	Fr	Larkin HS	Elgin, IL
F	14	Sam Thomas	6 ft 0 in (1.83 m)	Fr	Centennial HS	Bloomfield Hills, MI
F	20	Dominique McBryde (redshirt)	6 ft 2 in (1.88 m)	Jr	Bedford North Lawrence HS/Purdue	Bedford, IN
F	21	Destiny Graham	6 ft 3 in (1.91 m)	Jr	Eastside College Prep	East Palo Alto, CA
G	22	Lindsey Malecha (W)	5 ft 9 in (1.75 m)	Jr	Hill-Murray HS	Mahtomedi, MN
G	32	Kiana Barkhoff	6 ft 3 in (1.91 m)	Fr	Palm Harbor University HS	Kitzingen, Germany
G	33	JaLea Bennett	6 ft 0 in (1.83 m)	Sr	Mansfield Timberview HS	Grand Prairie, TX
G	44	Ali Reese (W)	5 ft 9 in (1.75 m)	Fr	Cypress Woods HS	Cypress, TX

Head coach

- Adia Barnes (Arizona)

Assistant coach(es)

- Sunny Smallwood (Boise State)
- Salvo Coppa (IULM)
- Morgan Valley (Washington)

Legend

- (C) Team captain
- (S) Suspended
- (I) Ineligible
- (W) Walk-on
- Injured
- Current redshirt

Roster

== Schedule ==
Date time, TV	Rank^{#}	Opponent^{#}	Result	Record	Site (attendance) city, state
Exhibition
Oct. 30, 2017*; 7:00 pm		Eastern New Mexico	W 69–50	–	McKale Center (1,151); Tucson, AZ
Nov. 6, 2017*; 7:00 pm		Western New Mexico	W 80–36	–	McKale Center; Tucson, AZ
Non-conference regular season
Nov. 10, 2017*; 12:00 pm		Iona	W 71–58	1–0	McKale Center; Tucson, AZ
Nov. 17, 2017*; 7:00 pm		at Utah State	W 65–49	2–0	Smith Spectrum (597); Logan, UT
Nov. 21, 2017*; 8:00 pm		at Loyola Marymount	L 70–84	2–1	Gersten Pavilion (366); Los Angeles, CA
Nov. 24, 2017*; 6:00 pm		vs. TCU; CSUN Tournament	L 59–68	2–2	Matadome (200); Northridge, CA
Nov. 25, 2017*; 6:00 pm		vs. Cal State Northridge; CSUN Tournament	L 63–66	2–3	Matadome (307); Northridge, CA
Nov. 28, 2017*; 7:00 pm		Long Beach State	L 72–80	2–4	McKale Center (1,362); Tucson, AZ
Dec. 3, 2017*; 2:00 pm		San Diego State	L 67–78	2–5	McKale Center (1,555); Tucson, AZ
Dec. 7, 2017*; 6:30 pm, FSAZ+		at Northern Arizona	L 66–84	2–6	Rolle Activity Center (383); Flagstaff, AZ
Dec. 14, 2017*; 11:00 am		New Mexico State	W 83–44	3–6	McKale Center (7,558); Tucson, AZ
Dec. 17, 2017*; 2:00 pm		Hawaii	L 60–65	3–7	McKale Center (1,397); Tucson, AZ
Dec. 20, 2017*; 7:00 pm		Southern Utah	W 76–74 ^{2OT}	4–7	McKale Center (1,215); Tucson, AZ
Pac-12 regular season
Dec. 29, 2017; 6:00 pm		at Utah	L 55–89	4–8 (0–1)	Jon M. Huntsman Center (1,828); Salt Lake City, UT
Dec. 31, 2017; 1:00 pm		at Colorado	L 60–79	4–9 (0–2)	Coors Events Center (1,526); Boulder, CO
Jan. 5, 2018; 6:00 pm, P12N		No. 24 Stanford	L 46–61	4–10 (0–3)	McKale Center (1,452); Tucson, AZ
Jan. 7, 2018; 12:00 pm, P12N		No. 23 California	L 51–53	4–11 (0–4)	McKale Center (1,322); Tucson, AZ
Jan. 12, 2018; 9:00 pm, P12N		at No. 8 Oregon	L 44–62	4–12 (0–5)	Matthew Knight Arena (3,466); Eugene, OR
Jan. 14, 2018; 2:00 pm, P12N		at No. 22 Oregon State	L 44–88	4–13 (0–6)	Gill Coliseum (4,226); Corvallis, OR
Jan. 19, 2018; 6:00 pm, P12N		Colorado	W 72–63	5–13 (1–6)	McKale Center (1,426); Tucson, AZ
Jan. 21, 2018; 12:00 pm, P12N		Utah	L 56–80	5–14 (1–7)	McKale Center (1,357); Tucson, AZ
Jan. 26, 2018; 8:00 pm		at No. 23 California	L 39–63	5–15 (1–8)	Haas Pavilion (2,463); Berkeley, CA
Jan. 28, 2018; 6:00 pm, P12N		at Stanford	L 42–79	5–16 (1–9)	Maples Pavilion (3,136); Stanford, CA
Feb. 2, 2018; 6:00 pm, P12N		Washington State	L 60–78	5–17 (1–10)	McKale Center (1,612); Tucson, AZ
Feb 4, 2018; 12:00 pm		Washington	W 72–70	6–17 (2–10)	McKale Center (1,886); Tucson, AZ
Feb. 9, 2018; 9:00 pm, P12N		at No. 8 UCLA	L 46–69	6–18 (2–11)	Pauley Pavilion (1,883); Los Angeles, CA
Feb. 11, 2018; 2:00 pm		at USC	L 52–78	6–19 (2–12)	Galen Center (572); Los Angeles, CA
Feb. 16, 2018; 7:00 pm, P12N		at Arizona State; Rivalry	L 50–75	6–20 (2–13)	Wells Fargo Arena (3,025); Tempe, AZ
Feb. 18, 2018; 4:00 pm, P12N		Arizona State; Rivalry	L 45–69	6–21 (2–14)	McKale Center (2,154); Tucson, AZ
Feb. 23, 2018; 8:00 pm, P12N		No. 12 Oregon State	L 40–65	6–22 (2–15)	McKale Center (1,543); Tucson, AZ
Feb. 25, 2018; 12:00 pm, P12N		Oregon	L 61–74	6–23 (2–16)	McKale Center (1,674); Tucson, AZ
Pac-12 Women's Tournament
03/01/2018; 9:30 pm, P12N	(11)	vs. (6) Arizona State; First Round	L 47–76	6–24	KeyArena (3,517); Seattle, WA
*Non-conference game. ^{#}Rankings from AP Poll. (#) Tournament seedings in parentheses. All times are in Mountain Time.

== Rankings ==
Ranking movement Legend: ██ Increase in ranking. ██ Decrease in ranking. NR = Not ranked. RV = Received votes.
Poll	Pre	Wk 2	Wk 3	Wk 4	Wk 5	Wk 6	Wk 7	Wk 8	Wk 9	Wk 10	Wk 11	Wk 12	Wk 13	Wk 14	Wk 15	Wk 16	Wk 17	Wk 18	Wk 19	Final
AP																				N/A
Coaches																				

== See also ==
2017–18 Arizona Wildcats men's basketball team
