= 2017–18 Stanford Cardinal women's basketball team =

Intercollegiate basketball season

2017–18 Stanford Cardinal women's basketball

NCAA tournament, Sweet Sixteen
- Conference: Pac-12 Conference

Ranking
- Coaches: No. 13
- AP: No. 15
- Record: 24–11 (14–3 Pac-12)
- Head coach: Tara VanDerveer (32nd season)
- Assistant coaches: Lindy La Rocque; Tempie Brown; Kate Paye
- Home arena: Maples Pavilion

2017–18 Pac-12 Conference women's basketball standings
	Conf.				Overall
Team	W		L	PCT	W		L	PCT
No. 6 Oregon †	16	–	2	.889	33	–	5	.868
No. 15 Stanford	14	–	3	.824	24	–	11	.686
No. 9 UCLA	14	–	4	.778	27	–	8	.771
No. 13 Oregon State	14	–	4	.778	26	–	8	.765
California	11	–	7	.611	21	–	11	.656
Arizona State	10	–	8	.556	22	–	13	.629
USC	9	–	9	.500	20	–	11	.645
Utah	8	–	10	.444	18	–	14	.563
Colorado	5	–	13	.278	15	–	16	.484
Washington State	3	–	14	.176	10	–	20	.333
Arizona	2	–	16	.111	6	–	24	.200
Washington	1	–	17	.056	7	–	23	.233
† 2018 Pac-12 Tournament winner As of 26 March 2018; Rankings from AP Poll

The 2017–18 Stanford Cardinal women's basketball team represented Stanford University during the 2017–18 NCAA Division I women's basketball season. The Cardinal, led by thirty-second year head coach Tara VanDerveer, played their home games at the Maples Pavilion and were members of the Pac-12 Conference. They finished the season 24–11, 14–3 in Pac-12 play to finish in second place. They advanced to the championship game of the Pac-12 women's tournament where they lost to Oregon. They received an at-large the NCAA women's tournament where they defeated Gonzaga and Florida Gulf Coast in the first and second rounds before losing to Louisville in the sweet sixteen.

== Roster ==
2017–18 Stanford Cardinal women's basketball team
Players
Coaches

Pos.	#	Name	Height	Year	Previous school	Hometown
C	2	Shannon Coffee	6 ft 5 in (1.96 m)	Jr	Centerville	Dayton, OH
G	3	Anna Wilson	5 ft 9 in (1.75 m)	So	Bellevue	Bellevue, WA
F	4	Nadia Fingall	6 ft 3 in (1.91 m)	So	Choctawhatchee	Navarre, FL
F	5	Kaylee Johnson	6 ft 3 in (1.91 m)	Sr	Natrona County	Casper, WY
F	10	Alyssa Jerome	6 ft 2 in (1.88 m)	Fr	Harbord Collegiate	Toronto, ON
F	11	Alanna Smith	6 ft 3 in (1.91 m)	Jr	Wesley College	Melbourne, Australia
G	12	Brittany McPhee	6 ft 0 in (1.83 m)	Sr	Mount Rainier	Normandy Park, WA
G	13	Marta Sniezek	5 ft 8 in (1.73 m)	Jr	National Cathedral	McLean, VA
G	14	Mikaela Brewer	5 ft 8 in (1.73 m)	So	Innisdale Secondary School	Barrie, ON
F	15	Maya Dodson	6 ft 3 in (1.91 m)	Fr	St. Francis	Alpharetta, GA
F	20	Estella Moschkau	6 ft 1 in (1.85 m)	Fr	Edgewood	Madison, WI
G	21	DiJonai Carrington	5 ft 11 in (1.8 m)	So	Horizon Christian Academy	San Diego, CA
G	22	Alexa Romano	5 ft 10 in (1.78 m)	Jr	La Cueva	Albuquerque, NM
G	23	Kiana Williams	5 ft 8 in (1.73 m)	Fr	Karen Wagner	San Antonio, TX

Head coach

- Tara VanDerveer (Indiana)

Assistant coach(es)

- Lindy La Rocque (Stanford)
- Tempie Brown (Michigan)
- Kate Paye (Stanford)

Legend

- (C) Team captain
- (S) Suspended
- (I) Ineligible
- (W) Walk-on
- Injured
- Current redshirt

Roster
Last update: November 12, 2017

== Schedule ==
Date time, TV	Rank^{#}	Opponent^{#}	Result	Record	Site (attendance) city, state
Exhibition
11/04/2017*; 4:00 pm	No. 10	UC San Diego	W 60–46		Maples Pavilion (2,523); Stanford, CA
Non-conference regular season
11/10/2017*; 3:00 pm, BTN	No. 10	at No. 5 Ohio State	L 64–85	0–1	St. John Arena (5,854); Columbus, OH
11/12/2017*; 10:30 am, ESPN	No. 10	vs. No. 1 Connecticut; Countdown to Columbus/Rivalry	L 53–78	0–2	Nationwide Arena (9,711); Columbus, OH
11/17/2017*; 7:00 pm, P12N	No. 14	UC Riverside	W 53–43	1–2	Maples Pavilion (2,266); Stanford, CA
11/19/2017*; 2:00 pm	No. 14	Cal State Bakersfield	W 57–34	2–2	Maples Pavilion (2,238); Stanford, CA
11/23/2017*; 5:30 pm	No. 14	vs. Kent State; Play4Kay Shootout Quarterfinals	W 79–54	3–2	Mandalay Bay Events Center (1,207); Paradise, NV
11/24/2017*; 8:00 pm	No. 14	vs. Belmont; Play4Kay Shootout Semifinals	W 74–53	4–2	Mandalay Bay Events Center (1,221); Paradise, NV
11/25/2017*; 8:00 pm	No. 14	vs. No. 9 Ohio State; Play4Kay Shootout Championship	L 82–94 ^{OT}	4–3	Mandalay Bay Events Center (1,232); Paradise, NV
11/29/2017*; 7:00 pm	No. 16	at San Francisco	W 86–66	5–3	War Memorial Gymnasium (775); San Francisco, CA
12/03/2017*; 11:00 am, FS1	No. 16	at No. 9 Baylor	L 57–81	5–4	Ferrell Center (8,012); Waco, TX
12/16/2017*; 2:00 pm	No. 18	UNLV	W 74–33	6–4	Maples Pavilion (2,763); Stanford, CA
12/18/2017*; 7:00 pm	No. 18	Western Illinois	L 64–71	6–5	Maples Pavilion (2,254); Stanford, CA
12/21/2017*; 6:00 pm, P12N	No. 18	No. 7 Tennessee; Rivalry	L 71–83	6–6	Maples Pavilion (3,084); Stanford, CA
Pac-12 regular season
12/29/2017; 5:30 pm, P12N		No. 11 UCLA	W 76–65	7–6 (1–0)	Maples Pavilion (3,102); Stanford, CA
12/31/2017; 1:00 pm, P12N		USC	W 72–65	8–6 (2–0)	Maples Pavilion (2,494); Stanford, CA
01/05/2018; 5:00 pm, P12N	No. 24	at Arizona	W 61–46	9–6 (3–0)	McKale Center (1,452); Tucson, AZ
01/07/2018; 1:00 pm, ESPN2	No. 24	at No. 25 Arizona State	L 66–73	9–7 (3–1)	Wells Fargo Arena (3,096); Tempe, AZ
01/12/2018; 6:00 pm, P12N		Washington State	W 70–57	10–7 (4–1)	Maples Pavilion (3,696); Stanford, CA
01/14/2018; 3:00 pm, P12N		Washington	W 71–45	11–7 (5–1)	Maples Pavilion (3,052); Stanford, CA
01/19/2018; 8:00 pm, P12N		at USC	W 59–55	12–7 (6–1)	Galen Center (882); Los Angeles, CA
01/21/2018; 3:00 pm, P12N		at No. 13 UCLA	L 53–64	12–8 (6–2)	Pauley Pavilion (2,948); Los Angeles, CA
01/26/2018; 7:00 pm, P12N		No. 25 Arizona State	W 74–50	13–8 (7–2)	Maples Pavilion (2,905); Stanford, CA
01/28/2018; 5:00 pm, P12N		Arizona	W 79–42	14–8 (8–2)	Maples Pavilion (3,136); Stanford, CA
02/02/2018; 6:00 pm, P12N	No. 24	at No. 16 Oregon State	W 60–57	15–8 (9–2)	Gill Coliseum (5,791); Corvallis, OR
02/04/2018; 12:00 pm, ESPN2	No. 24	at No. 6 Oregon	W 78–65	16–8 (10–2)	Matthew Knight Arena (5,126); Eugene, OR
02/09/2018; 7:00 pm	No. 17	Utah	W 70–49	17–8 (11–2)	Maples Pavilion (3,200); Stanford, CA
02/11/2018; 3:00 pm, P12N	No. 17	Colorado	W 62–53	18–8 (12–2)	Maples Pavilion (3,838); Stanford, CA
02/15/2018; 7:00 pm, P12N	No. 14	California	W 74–69	19–8 (13–2)	Maples Pavilion (3,074); Stanford, CA
02/17/2018; 3:00 pm, P12N	No. 14	at California	L 66–78	19–9 (13–3)	Haas Pavilion (4,211); Berkeley, CA
02/23/2018; 8:00 pm, P12N	No. 16	at Washington	W 86–79	20–9 (14–3)	Alaska Airlines Arena (1,848); Seattle, WA
02/25/2018; 1:00 pm, P12N	No. 16	at Washington State	Cancelled		Beasley Coliseum; Pullman, WA
Pac-12 Women's Tournament
03/02/2018; 6:00 pm, P12N	(2) No. 16	vs. (7) USC; Quarterfinals	W 69–59	21–9	KeyArena; Seattle, WA
03/03/2018; 8:30 pm, P12N	(2) No. 16	vs. (6) Arizona State; Semifinals	W 58–46	22–9	KeyArena (6,889); Seattle, WA
03/04/2018; 6:00 pm, ESPN2	(2) No. 16	vs. (1) No. 6 Oregon; Championship Game	L 57–77	22–10	KeyArena (5,387); Seattle, WA
NCAA Women's Tournament
03/17/2018*; 3:00 pm, ESPN2	(4 S) No. 15	(13 L) Gonzaga; First Round	W 82–68	23–10	Maples Pavilion (2,686); Stanford, CA
03/19/2018*; 6:00 pm, ESPN2	(4 S) No. 15	(12 L) Florida Gulf Coast; Second Round	W 90–70	24–10	Maples Pavilion (2,049); Stanford, CA
03/23/2018*; 6:00 pm, ESPN	(4 S) No. 15	vs. (1 L) No. 3 Louisville; Sweet Sixteen	L 59–86	24–11	Rupp Arena (5,715); Lexington, KY
*Non-conference game. ^{#}Rankings from AP Poll. (#) Tournament seedings in parentheses. L=Lexington Region. All times are in Pacific Time.

- The February 25th game versus Washington State cougars was cancelled due to the death of the Cougars' director of strength and conditioning David Lang.

== Rankings ==
2017–18 NCAA Division I women's basketball rankings

Regular season polls
Poll	Pre- Season	Week 2	Week 3	Week 4	Week 5	Week 6	Week 7	Week 8	Week 9	Week 10	Week 11	Week 12	Week 13	Week 14	Week 15	Week 16	Week 17	Week 18	Week 19	Final
AP	10	14	14	16	18	18	18	RV	24	RV	RV	RV	24	17	14	16	16	15	15	N/A
Coaches	9	12	14	18	18	17	24	RV	RV	RV	RV	RV	RV	21	20	20	20	20	19	13

Legend
	Increase in ranking
	Decrease in ranking
	No change
(RV)	Received votes
(NR)	Not ranked

== See also ==
2017–18 Stanford Cardinal men's basketball team
