= 2017–18 Oregon State Beavers women's basketball team =

Intercollegiate basketball season

2017–18 Oregon State Beavers women's basketball

NCAA women's tournament, Elite Eight
- Conference: Pac-12 Conference

Ranking
- Coaches: No. 8
- AP: No. 13
- Record: 26–8 (14–4 Pac-12)
- Head coach: Scott Rueck (8th season)
- Associate head coach: Jonas Chatterton
- Assistant coaches: Brian Holsinger; Katie Baker
- Home arena: Gill Coliseum

2017–18 Pac-12 Conference women's basketball standings
	Conf.				Overall
Team	W		L	PCT	W		L	PCT
No. 6 Oregon †	16	–	2	.889	33	–	5	.868
No. 15 Stanford	14	–	3	.824	24	–	11	.686
No. 9 UCLA	14	–	4	.778	27	–	8	.771
No. 13 Oregon State	14	–	4	.778	26	–	8	.765
California	11	–	7	.611	21	–	11	.656
Arizona State	10	–	8	.556	22	–	13	.629
USC	9	–	9	.500	20	–	11	.645
Utah	8	–	10	.444	18	–	14	.563
Colorado	5	–	13	.278	15	–	16	.484
Washington State	3	–	14	.176	10	–	20	.333
Arizona	2	–	16	.111	6	–	24	.200
Washington	1	–	17	.056	7	–	23	.233
† 2018 Pac-12 Tournament winner As of 26 March 2018; Rankings from AP Poll

The 2017–18 Oregon State Beavers women's basketball team represented Oregon State University during the 2017–18 NCAA Division I women's basketball season. The Beavers, led by eighth-year head coach Scott Rueck, played their games at the Gill Coliseum and were members of the Pac-12 Conference. They finished the season 26–8, 14–4 in Pac-12 play, to finish in a tie for third place. They lost in the quarterfinals of the Pac-12 women's tournament to Arizona State. They received an at-large bid to the NCAA women's tournament, where they defeated Western Kentucky and upset Tennessee in the first and second rounds, and Baylor in the Sweet Sixteen, before getting blown out by Louisville in the Elite Eight.

== Previous season ==
They finished the season 31–5, 16–2 in Pac-12 play, to win the Pac-12 regular season title. They advanced to the championship game of the Pac-12 women's tournament, where they lost to Stanford. They received an at-large bid to the NCAA women's tournament, where they defeated Long Beach State and Creighton in the first and second rounds before losing to Florida State in the Sweet Sixteen.

== Roster ==
2017–18 Oregon State Beavers women's basketball team
Players
Coaches

Pos.	#	Name	Height	Year	Previous school	Hometown
G	0	Mikayla Pivec	5 ft 9 in (1.75 m)	So	Lynnwood HS	Lynnwood, WA
G	1	Aleah Goodman	5 ft 9 in (1.75 m)	Fr	La Salle HS	Milwaukie, OR
G/F	3	Madison Washington	6 ft 1 in (1.85 m)	So	Bishop Gorman HS	Las Vegas, NV
F	5	Taya Corosdale	6 ft 3 in (1.91 m)	Fr	Bothell HS	Bothell, WA
G	10	Katie McWilliams	6 ft 2 in (1.88 m)	Jr	South Salem HS	Salem, OR
C	11	Joanna Grymek	6 ft 8 in (2.03 m)	Jr	Seward CC	Kraków, Poland
F	13	Janessa Thropay	6 ft 2 in (1.88 m)	So	Chino HS	Chino, CA
C	21	Marie Gülich	6 ft 5 in (1.96 m)	Sr	Landrat-Lucas Gymnasium	Cologne, Germany
G	22	Kat Tudor	6 ft 0 in (1.83 m)	So	St. Mary's HS	Stockton, CA
G	24	Destiny Slocum (redshirt)	5 ft 7 in (1.7 m)	So	Mountain View HS; Maryland	Meridian, ID
G	25	Taylor Kalmer	5 ft 8 in (1.73 m)	Jr	Corona del Sol HS	Chandler, AZ

Head coach

- Scott Rueck (Oregon State)

Assistant coach(es)

- Jonas Chatterton (Utah)
- Brian Holsinger (Western Washington)
- Katie Baker (Montana)

Legend

- (C) Team captain
- (S) Suspended
- (I) Ineligible
- (W) Walk-on
- Injured
- Current redshirt

Roster
Last update: August 4, 2024

== Schedule ==
Date time, TV	Rank^{#}	Opponent^{#}	Result	Record	Site (attendance) city, state
Exhibition
November 5, 2017*; 2:00 p.m.	No. 19	Concordia (OR)	W 90–47		Gill Coliseum; Corvallis, OR
Non-conference regular season
November 10, 2017*; 2:00 p.m.	No. 19	North Dakota	W 65–55	1–0	Gill Coliseum (3,737); Corvallis, OR
November 15, 2017*; 6:00 p.m.	No. 18	Utah Valley	W 98–41	2–0	Gill Coliseum (2,925); Corvallis, OR
November 19, 2017*; 11:00 a.m., P12N	No. 18	No. 6 Notre Dame	L 67–72	2–1	Gill Coliseum (7,570); Corvallis, OR
November 22, 2017*; 11:00 a.m.	No. 18	at North Carolina Central	W 97–44	3–1	McDougald–McLendon Gymnasium (219); Durham, NC
November 25, 2017*; 12:00 p.m.	No. 18	at No. 16 Duke	L 65–72	3–2	Cameron Indoor Stadium (3,408); Durham, NC
December 1, 2017*; 9:00 p.m.	No. 21	vs. Nevada; Maui Classic	W 89–49	4–2	War Memorial Gym (785); Wailuku, HI
December 2, 2017*; 9:00 p.m.	No. 21	vs. Utah State; Maui Classic	W 94–55	5–2	War Memorial Gym (590); Wailuku, HI
December 10, 2017*; 2:00 p.m.	No. 19	San Jose State	W 110–62	6–2	Gill Coliseum (3,198); Corvallis, OR
December 13, 2017*; 11:00 a.m.	No. 17	Savannah State	W 84–36	7–2	Gill Coliseum (8,280); Corvallis, OR
December 16, 2017*; 5:00 p.m., P12N	No. 17	vs. UC Santa Barbara; Dam City Classic	W 74–49	8–2	Moda Center; Portland, OR
December 20, 2017*; 6:00 p.m.	No. 17	UC Davis	W 61–47	9–2	Gill Coliseum (3,474); Corvallis, OR
Pac-12 regular season
December 29, 2017; 2:00 p.m.	No. 17	Washington	W 75–63	10–2 (1–0)	Gill Coliseum (4,247); Corvallis, OR
December 31, 2017; 11:00 a.m., P12N	No. 17	Washington State	W 71–53	11–2 (2–0)	Gill Coliseum (3,884); Corvallis, OR
January 5, 2018; 6:00 p.m., P12N	No. 16	at No. 14 UCLA	L 49–84	11–3 (2–1)	Pauley Pavilion (1,986); Los Angeles, CA
January 7, 2018; 1:00 p.m., P12N	No. 16	at USC	L 61–65	11–4 (2–2)	Galen Center (592); Los Angeles, CA
January 12, 2018; 6:00 p.m., P12N	No. 22	No. 18 Arizona State	W 57–54	12–4 (3–2)	Gill Coliseum (3,954); Corvallis, OR
January 14, 2018; 1:00 p.m., P12N	No. 22	Arizona	W 88–44	13–4 (4–2)	Gill Coliseum (4,226); Corvallis, OR
January 19, 2018; 8:00 p.m., P12N	No. 18	No. 7 Oregon; Civil War	W 85–79 ^{OT}	14–4 (5–2)	Gill Coliseum (6,704); Corvallis, OR
January 21, 2018; 5:00 p.m., P12N	No. 18	at No. 7 Oregon; Civil War	L 63–75	14–5 (5–3)	Matthew Knight Arena (7,249); Eugene, OR
January 26, 2018; 5:00 p.m., P12N	No. 17	at Utah	W 69–58	15–5 (6–3)	Jon M. Huntsman Center (2,566); Salt Lake City, UT
January 28, 2018; 1:00 p.m., P12N	No. 17	at Colorado	W 86–71	16–5 (7–3)	Coors Events Center (3,781); Boulder, CO
February 2, 2018; 6:00 p.m., P12N	No. 16	No. 24 Stanford	L 57–60	16–6 (7–4)	Gill Coliseum (5,791); Corvallis, OR
February 4, 2018; 1:00 p.m., P12N	No. 16	No. 25 California	W 68–48	17–6 (8–4)	Gill Coliseum (3,706); Corvallis, OR
February 9, 2018; 6:00 p.m., P12N	No. 16	at Washington State	W 63–61 ^{OT}	18–6 (9–4)	Beasley Coliseum (906); Pullman, WA
February 11, 2017; 3:00 p.m., P12N	No. 16	at Washington	W 95–57	19–6 (10–4)	Alaska Airlines Arena (2,589); Seattle, WA
February 16, 2017; 8:00 p.m., P12N	No. 15	No. 7 UCLA	W 67–64 ^{OT}	20–6 (11–4)	Gill Coliseum (5,011); Corvallis, OR
February 18, 2018; 1:00 p.m., P12N	No. 15	USC	W 69–63	21–6 (12–4)	Gill Coliseum (4,942); Corvallis, OR
February 23, 2018; 7:00 p.m., P12N	No. 12	at Arizona	W 65–40	22–6 (13–4)	McKale Center (1,543); Tucson, AZ
February 25, 2018; 1:00 p.m., P12N	No. 12	at Arizona State	W 64–60	23–6 (14–4)	Wells Fargo Arena (3,258); Tempe, AZ
Pac-12 women's tournament
March 2, 2018; 8:30 p.m., P12N	(3) No. 10	vs. (6) Arizona State; Quarterfinals	L 51–57	23–7	KeyArena (4,741); Seattle, WA
NCAA women's tournament
March 16, 2018*; 9:00 a.m., ESPN2	(6 L) No. 13	vs. (11 L) Western Kentucky; First round	W 82–58	24–7	Thompson–Boling Arena; Knoxville, TN
March 18, 2018*; 11:00 a.m., ESPN2	(6 L) No. 13	at (3 L) No. 12 Tennessee; Second round	W 66–59	25–7	Thompson–Boling Arena (4,338); Knoxville, TN
March 23, 2018*; 4:00 p.m., ESPN2	(6 L) No. 13	vs. (2 L) No. 2 Baylor; Sweet Sixteen	W 72–67	26–7	Rupp Arena; Lexington, KY
March 25, 2018*; 9:00 a.m., ESPN	(6 L) No. 13	vs. (1 L) No. 3 Louisville; Elite Eight	L 43–76	26–8	Rupp Arena (6,268); Lexington, KY
*Non-conference game. ^{#}Rankings from AP poll. (#) Tournament seedings in parentheses. L=Lexington Region. All times are in Pacific.

== Rankings ==
Regular-season polls
Poll	Pre- season	Week 2	Week 3	Week 4	Week 5	Week 6	Week 7	Week 8	Week 9	Week 10	Week 11	Week 12	Week 13	Week 14	Week 15	Week 16	Week 17	Week 18	Week 19	Final
AP	19	18	18	21	19	18	17	17	16	22	18	17	16	16	15	12	10	13	13	N/A
Coaches	17	N/A	18	19	19	17	17	17	16	21	19	17	16	16	14	11	10	12	12	8

Legend
	Increase in ranking
	Decrease in ranking
	No change
(RV)	Received votes
(NR)	Not ranked

== See also ==
- 2017–18 Oregon State Beavers men's basketball team
