= 2017–18 Utah Utes women's basketball team =

Intercollegiate basketball season

2017–18 Utah Utes women's basketball

WNIT, Second Round
- Conference: Pac-12 Conference
- Record: 18–14 (8–10 Pac–12)
- Head coach: Lynne Roberts (3rd season)
- Assistant coaches: Gavin Petersen; Danyelle Snelgro; Joanna Reitz
- Home arena: Jon M. Huntsman Center

2017–18 Pac-12 Conference women's basketball standings
	Conf.				Overall
Team	W		L	PCT	W		L	PCT
No. 6 Oregon †	16	–	2	.889	33	–	5	.868
No. 15 Stanford	14	–	3	.824	24	–	11	.686
No. 9 UCLA	14	–	4	.778	27	–	8	.771
No. 13 Oregon State	14	–	4	.778	26	–	8	.765
California	11	–	7	.611	21	–	11	.656
Arizona State	10	–	8	.556	22	–	13	.629
USC	9	–	9	.500	20	–	11	.645
Utah	8	–	10	.444	18	–	14	.563
Colorado	5	–	13	.278	15	–	16	.484
Washington State	3	–	14	.176	10	–	20	.333
Arizona	2	–	16	.111	6	–	24	.200
Washington	1	–	17	.056	7	–	23	.233
† 2018 Pac-12 Tournament winner As of 26 March 2018; Rankings from AP Poll

The 2017–18 Utah Utes women's basketball team represented the University of Utah during the 2017–18 NCAA Division I women's basketball season. The Utes, led by third-year head coach Lynne Roberts, played their home games at the Jon M. Huntsman Center and were members of the Pac-12 Conference. They finished the season 18–14, 8–10 in Pac-12 play to finish in eighth place. They lost in the first round of the Pac-12 women's tournament to Colorado. They received an automatic bid to the Women's National Invitation Tournament, where they defeated UNLV in the first round before losing to Kansas State in the second round.

== Previous season ==
They finished the season 16–15, 5–13 in Pac-12 play to finish in a four-way tie for ninth place. They lost in the first round of the Pac-12 women's tournament to Arizona State. They were invited to the Women's National Invitation Tournament, where they lost to UC Davis in the first round.

== Roster ==
2017–18 Utah Utes women's basketball team
Players
Coaches

Pos.	#	Name	Height	Year	Previous school	Hometown
G	0	Kiana Moore	5 ft 7 in (1.7 m)	So	Vanden HS	Fairfield, CA
G/F	1	Jordan Cruz	5 ft 11 in (1.8 m)	Fr	C.K. McClatchy HS	Sacramento, CA
G	2	Tori Williams	5 ft 9 in (1.75 m)	Fr	Centennial	Boise, ID
F	5	Megan Huff	6 ft 3 in (1.91 m)	RS Jr	Todd Beamer HS; Hawaii	Federal Way, WA
G	11	Erika Bean	5 ft 8 in (1.73 m)	Jr	Bradshaw Christian HS	Sacramento, CA
F	12	Emily Potter	6 ft 6 in (1.98 m)	RS Sr	Glenlawn Collegiate	Winnipeg, MB
G/F	13	Megan Jacobs	6 ft 1 in (1.85 m)	So	Bishop Gorman HS	Las Vegas, NV
F	14	Elli Koskinen	6 ft 5 in (1.96 m)	Fr	Kerttulin lukio, Turku	Salo, Finland
G	20	Dru Gylten	5 ft 11 in (1.8 m)	Fr	St. Thomas More HS	Rapid City, SD
F	21	Wendy Anae	6 ft 3 in (1.91 m)	RS Sr	Cathedral Catholic HS	San Diego, CA
F	22	Arianna Lalonde	6 ft 4 in (1.93 m)	Fr	Chandler HS	Phoenix, AZ
G/F	23	Daneesha Provo	5 ft 11 in (1.8 m)	RS Jr	Kent School; Clemson	Dartmouth, NS
G	24	Tilar Clark	5 ft 11 in (1.8 m)	Sr	Skyline HS; Salt Lake CC	Idaho Falls, ID
F	25	Maurane Corbin	6 ft 5 in (1.96 m)	Fr	Montmorency (CEGEP)	Saint-Bruno-de-Montarville, QC
G/F	32	Tanaeya Boclair	6 ft 0 in (1.83 m)	Sr	Brennan HS	San Antonio, TX

Head coach

- Lynne Roberts (Seattle Pacific)

Assistant coach(es)

- Gavin Petersen (Hawaiʻi)
- Danyelle Snelgro (Utah State)
- Joanna Reitz (Covenant)

Legend

- (C) Team captain
- (S) Suspended
- (I) Ineligible
- (W) Walk-on
- Injured
- Current redshirt

Roster
Last update: February 24, 2018

== Schedule and results ==
Date time, TV	Rank^{#}	Opponent^{#}	Result	Record	Site (attendance) city, state
Exhibition
11/02/2017*; 11:00 am		Carroll (MT)	W 70–46		Jon M. Huntsman Center; Salt Lake City, UT
Non-conference regular season
11/10/2017*; 5:30 pm		Nevada	W 87–61	1–0	Jon M. Huntsman Center (1,659); Salt Lake City, UT
11/13/2017*; 6:00 pm		at Alabama	L 60–65	1–1	Coleman Coliseum (2,035); Tuscaloosa, AL
11/17/2017*; 7:00 pm		at Weber State; Old Oquirrh Bucket	W 85–58	2–1	Dee Events Center (686); Ogden, UT
11/20/2017*; 7:00 pm, P12N		Purdue	W 81–68	3–1	Jon M. Huntsman Center (1,887); Salt Lake City, UT
11/24/2017*; 3:30 pm		Incarnate Word	W 90–31	4–1	Jon M. Huntsman Center (1,104); Salt Lake City, UT
11/27/2017*; 6:00 pm		Texas–Arlington	W 71–41	5–1	Jon M. Huntsman Center (917); Salt Lake City, UT
12/02/2017*; 2:30 pm, P12N		Saint Mary's	W 74–63	6–1	Jon M. Huntsman Center (1,086); Salt Lake City, UT
12/05/2017*; 6:00 pm		Pepperdine	W 89–65	7–1	Jon M. Huntsman Center (1,308); Salt Lake City, UT
12/09/2017*; 2:00 pm		at BYU; First Desert Duel/Old Oquirrh Bucket	L 68–77	7–2	Marriott Center (1,189); Provo, UT
12/18/2017*; 7:00 pm		at Utah State; Old Oquirrh Bucket	W 79–44	8–2	Smith Spectrum (666); Logan, UT
12/21/2017*; 1:00 pm		Oral Roberts	W 71–50	9–2	Jon M. Huntsman Center (933); Salt Lake City, UT
Pac-12 regular season
12/29/2017; 6:00 pm		Arizona	W 89–55	10–2 (1–0)	Jon M. Huntsman Center (1,828); Salt Lake City, UT
12/31/2017; 12:00 pm		Arizona State	L 81–83	10–3 (1–1)	Jon M. Huntsman Center (1,463); Salt Lake City, UT
01/05/2018; 7:00 pm, P12N		at Washington	W 74–65	11–3 (2–1)	Alaska Airlines Arena (1,746); Seattle, WA
01/07/2018; 12:00 pm, P12N		at Washington State	W 79–77	12–3 (3–1)	Beasley Coliseum (776); Pullman, WA
01/12/2018; 8:00 pm, P12N		No. 14 UCLA	L 74–81	12–4 (3–2)	Jon M. Huntsman Center (3,281); Salt Lake City, UT
01/14/2018; 12:00 pm, P12N		USC	L 47–58	12–5 (3–3)	Jon M. Huntsman Center (1,574); Salt Lake City, UT
01/19/2018; 11:00 am		at No. 22 Arizona State	W 58–56	13–5 (4–3)	Wells Fargo Arena (5,787); Tempe, AZ
01/21/2018; 12:00 pm, P12N		at Arizona	W 80–56	14–5 (5–3)	McKale Center (1,357); Tucson, AZ
01/26/2018; 6:00 pm, P12N		No. 17 Oregon State	L 58–69	14–6 (5–4)	Jon M. Huntsman Center (2,566); Salt Lake City, UT
01/28/2018; 12:00 pm, P12N		No. 7 Oregon	L 68–84	14–7 (5–5)	Jon M. Huntsman Center (1,728); Salt Lake City, UT
02/01/2018; 7:00 pm, P12N		Colorado	L 65–69	14–8 (5–6)	Jon M. Huntsman Center (1,812); Salt Lake City, UT
02/04/2018; 12:00 pm, P12N		at Colorado	W 78–74	15–8 (6–6)	Coors Events Center (1,591); Boulder, CO
02/09/2018; 8:00 pm		at No. 17 Stanford	L 49–70	15–9 (6–7)	Maples Pavilion (3,200); Stanford, CA
02/11/2018; 3:00 pm		at California	L 73–84	15–10 (6–8)	Haas Pavilion (2,507); Berkeley, CA
02/16/2018; 7:00 pm, P12N		Washington State	W 54–50	16–10 (7–8)	Jon M. Huntsman Center (3,149); Salt Lake City, UT
02/18/2018; 2:00 pm, P12N		Washington	W 81–46	17–10 (8–8)	Jon M. Huntsman Center (1,927); Salt Lake City, UT
02/22/2018; 7:00 pm, P12N		at USC	L 52–53 ^{OT}	17–11 (8–9)	Galen Center (592); Los Angeles, CA
02/24/2018; 3:00 pm		at UCLA	L 71–78 ^{OT}	17–12 (8–10)	Pauley Pavilion (3,866); Los Angeles, CA
Pac-12 Women's Tournament
03/01/2018; 12:30 pm, P12N	(8)	vs. (9) Colorado; First Round	L 56–66	17–13	KeyArena; Seattle, WA
WNIT
03/15/2018*; 7:00 pm		UNLV; First Round	W 78–68	18–13	Jon M. Huntsman Center (497); Salt Lake City, UT
03/18/2018*; 4:00 pm		at Kansas State; Second Round	L 57–74	18–14	Bramlage Coliseum (1,328); Manhattan, KS
*Non-conference game. ^{#}Rankings from AP Poll/Coaches' Poll. (#) Tournament seedings in parentheses. All times are in Mountain Time.

== Rankings ==
Regular season polls
Poll	Pre- season	Week 2	Week 3	Week 4	Week 5	Week 6	Week 7	Week 8	Week 9	Week 10	Week 11	Week 12	Week 13	Week 14	Week 15	Week 16	Week 17	Week 18	Week 19	Final
AP	NR	NR	NR	NR	NR	NR	NR	NR	NR	RV	NR	NR	NR	NR	NR	NR	NR	NR		N/A
Coaches	NR	NR	NR	NR	NR	NR	NR	NR	NR	NR	NR	NR	NR	NR	NR	NR	NR	NR		

Legend
	Increase in ranking
	Decrease in ranking
	No change
(RV)	Received votes
(NR)	Not ranked

== See also ==
- 2017–18 Utah Utes men's basketball team
