= 2017–18 Washington State Cougars women's basketball team =

Intercollegiate basketball season

2017–18 Washington State Cougars women's basketball
- Conference: Pac-12 Conference
- Record: 10–20 (3–14 Pac-12)
- Head coach: June Daugherty (11th season)
- Assistant coaches: Mike Daugherty; Ashley Gill; Rod Jensen
- Home arena: Beasley Coliseum

2017–18 Pac-12 Conference women's basketball standings
	Conf.				Overall
Team	W		L	PCT	W		L	PCT
No. 6 Oregon †	16	–	2	.889	33	–	5	.868
No. 15 Stanford	14	–	3	.824	24	–	11	.686
No. 9 UCLA	14	–	4	.778	27	–	8	.771
No. 13 Oregon State	14	–	4	.778	26	–	8	.765
California	11	–	7	.611	21	–	11	.656
Arizona State	10	–	8	.556	22	–	13	.629
USC	9	–	9	.500	20	–	11	.645
Utah	8	–	10	.444	18	–	14	.563
Colorado	5	–	13	.278	15	–	16	.484
Washington State	3	–	14	.176	10	–	20	.333
Arizona	2	–	16	.111	6	–	24	.200
Washington	1	–	17	.056	7	–	23	.233
† 2018 Pac-12 Tournament winner As of 26 March 2018; Rankings from AP Poll

The 2017–18 Washington State Cougars women's basketball team represented Washington State University during the 2017–18 NCAA Division I women's basketball season. The Cougars, led by eleventh-year head coach June Daugherty, played their home games at the Beasley Coliseum and were members of the Pac-12 Conference. They finished the season 10–20, 3–14 in the Pac-12 to finish in tenth place. They lost in the first round of the Pac-12 women's tournament to USC.

On March 13, June Daugherty was fired. She finished at Washington State with a record of 130–218. WSU hired Northern Colorado head coach Kamie Ethridge on April 16.

== Previous season ==
The Cougars finished the season 16–20, 6–12 in the Pac-12 to finish in a tie for seventh place. They advanced to the quarterfinals of the Pac-12 women's tournament, where they lost to Stanford. They were invited to the Women's National Invitation Tournament, where they defeated BYU, Wyoming and UC Davis in the first, second and third rounds, Iowa in the quarterfinals before losing to Georgia Tech in the semifinals.

== Roster ==
2017–18 Washington State Cougars women's basketball team
Players
Coaches

Pos.	#	Name	Height	Year	Previous school	Hometown
G	1	Caila Hailey	5 ft 10 in (1.78 m)	Sr	Serra HS	Inglewood, CA
G	2	Krystle McKenzie	5 ft 8 in (1.73 m)	RS Sr	N/A	Brisbane, Australia
F	4	Louise Brown	6 ft 1 in (1.85 m)	RS Jr	N/A	Melbourne, Australia
F	5	Kayla Washington	6 ft 0 in (1.83 m)	So	Cajon HS	San Bernardino, CA
G	10	Johanna Muzet	6 ft 0 in (1.83 m)	So	Lyon Basket	Lyon, France
G	11	Chanelle Molina	5 ft 9 in (1.75 m)	So	Konawaena HS	Kailua, HI
C	20	Maria Kostourkova	6 ft 4 in (1.93 m)	Jr	E.S.P.J.A.L.	Lisbon, Portugal
F	21	Nike McClure	6 ft 3 in (1.91 m)	RS Jr	W. F. West HS	Tenino, WA
G	22	Pinelopi Pavlopoulou	5 ft 8 in (1.73 m)	Sr	ACS Athens	Athens, Greece
G	23	Alexys Swedlund	5 ft 11 in (1.8 m)	Jr	St. Thomas More HS	Rapid City, SD
G	24	Celena Molina	5 ft 9 in (1.75 m)	Fr	Konawaena HS	Kailua, HI
F	41	Jovana Subasic	6 ft 1 in (1.85 m)	RS Fr	N/A	Šabac, Serbia
F	42	Taryn Shelley	6 ft 3 in (1.91 m)	Fr	Shorewood HS	Shoreline, WA
F	45	Borislava Hristova	6 ft 0 in (1.83 m)	RS So	Georgi Benkovski	Varna, Bulgaria

Head coach

- June Daugherty (Ohio State)

Assistant coach(es)

- Mike Daugherty (Ohio State)
- Ashley Gill (Washington State)
- Rod Jensen (Redlands)

Legend

- (C) Team captain
- (S) Suspended
- (I) Ineligible
- (W) Walk-on
- Injured
- Current redshirt

Roster
Last update: February 25, 2018

== Schedule ==
Date time, TV	Rank^{#}	Opponent^{#}	Result	Record	Site (attendance) city, state
Exhibition
11/01/2017*; 7:00 pm		The Master's University	W 95–57		Beasley Coliseum; Pullman, WA
Non-conference regular season
11/10/2017*; 7:00 pm		at UC Davis	L 76–91	0–1	The Pavilion (817); Davis, CA
11/12/2017*; 1:00 pm		at Saint Mary's	L 75–81	0–2	McKeon Pavilion (307); Moraga, CA
11/15/2017*; 7:00 pm		at San Francisco	W 74–70	1–2	War Memorial Gymnasium (358); San Francisco, CA
11/19/2017*; 1:00 pm, P12N		No. 25 Kentucky	L 68–73	1–3	Beasley Coliseum (991); Pullman, WA
11/24/2017*; 2:00 pm		vs. No. 17 South Florida; Gulf Coast Showcase Quarterfinals	L 45–82	1–4	Germain Arena (1,207); Estero, FL
11/25/2017*; 10:30 am		vs. East Tennessee State; Gulf Coast Showcase Consolation 2nd round	W 80–76	2–4	Germain Arena (1,537); Estero, FL
11/26/2017*; 10:30 am		vs. Rutgers; Gulf Coast Showcase 5th place game	W 63–60	3–4	Germain Arena (1,707); Estero, FL
12/01/2017*; 7:00 pm		Idaho State	W 72–55	4–4	Beasley Coliseum (652); Pullman, WA
12/04/2017*; 7:00 pm		Saint Louis	W 85–63	5–4	Beasley Coliseum (479); Pullman, WA
12/06/2017*; 7:00 pm, P12N		Gonzaga	L 56–62	5–5	Beasley Coliseum (977); Pullman, WA
12/18/2017*; 6:00 pm		at Boise State	W 61–53	6–5	Taco Bell Arena (896); Boise, ID
12/22/2017*; 11:00 am		at Nebraska	W 73–61	7–5	Pinnacle Bank Arena (4,404); Lincoln, NE
Pac-12 regular season
12/29/2017; 3:00 pm		at No. 10 Oregon	L 56–89	7–6 (0–1)	Matthew Knight Arena (3,476); Eugene, OR
12/31/2017; 11:00 am, P12N		at No. 17 Oregon State	L 53–71	7–7 (0–2)	Gill Coliseum (3,884); Corvallis, OR
01/05/2018; 8:00 pm, P12N		Colorado	W 89–75	8–7 (1–2)	Beasley Coliseum (679); Boulder, CO
01/07/2018; 11:00 am, P12N		Utah	L 77–79	8–8 (1–3)	Beasley Coliseum (776); Boulder, CO
01/12/2018; 6:00 pm, P12N		at Stanford	L 57–70	8–9 (1–4)	Maples Pavilion (3,696); Stanford, CA
01/14/2018; 1:00 pm, P12N		at No. 24 California	L 60–66	8–10 (1–5)	Haas Pavilion (1,758); Berkeley, CA
01/17/2018; 7:00 pm, P12N		Washington; Rivalry	W 78–75 ^{OT}	9–10 (2–5)	Beasley Coliseum (1,199); Pullman, WA
01/21/2018; 1:00 pm, P12N		at Washington; Rivalry	L 49–56	9–11 (2–6)	Alaska Airlines Arena (3,603); Seattle, WA
01/26/2018; 7:00 pm		USC	L 72–73	9–12 (2–7)	Beasley Coliseum (803); Pullman, WA
01/28/2018; 3:00 pm		No. 13 UCLA	L 71–79	9–13 (2–8)	Beasley Coliseum (1,093); Pullman, WA
02/02/2018; 5:00 pm, P12N		at Arizona	W 78–60	10–13 (3–8)	McKale Center (1,612); Tucson, AZ
02/04/2018; 1:00 pm		at Arizona State	L 51–77	10–14 (3–9)	Wells Fargo Arena (1,588); Tempe, AZ
02/09/2018; 6:00 pm, P12N		No. 16 Oregon State	L 61–63 ^{OT}	10–15 (3–10)	Beasley Coliseum (906); Pullman, WA
02/11/2018; 1:00 pm, P12N		No. 9 Oregon	L 79–90	10–16 (3–11)	Beasley Coliseum (1,122); Pullman, WA
02/16/2018; 6:00 pm, P12N		at Utah	L 50–54	10–17 (3–12)	Jon M. Huntsman Center (3,149); Salt Lake City, UT
02/18/2018; 11:00 am, P12N		at Colorado	L 69–72	10–18 (3–13)	Coors Events Center (3,423); Boulder, CO
02/22/2018; 7:00 pm		California	L 54–67	10–19 (3–14)	Beasley Coliseum (781); Pullman, WA
02/24/2018; 1:00 pm, P12N		No. 16 Stanford	Cancelled		Beasley Coliseum; Pullman, WA
Pac-12 Women's Tournament
03/01/2018; 6:00 pm, P12N	(10)	vs. (7) USC; First Round	L 44–47	10–20	KeyArena; Seattle, WA
*Non-conference game. ^{#}Rankings from AP Poll. (#) Tournament seedings in parentheses. All times are in Pacific Time.

== Rankings ==
- 2017–18 NCAA Division I women's basketball rankings

Regular season polls
Poll	Pre- season	Week 2	Week 3	Week 4	Week 5	Week 6	Week 7	Week 8	Week 9	Week 10	Week 11	Week 12	Week 13	Week 14	Week 15	Week 16	Week 17	Week 18	Week 19	Final
AP																				N/A
Coaches																				

Legend
	Increase in ranking
	Decrease in ranking
	No change
(RV)	Received votes
(NR)	Not ranked

== See also ==
- 2017–18 Washington State Cougars men's basketball team
