= 2017–18 USC Trojans women's basketball team =

Intercollegiate basketball season

2017–18 USC Trojans women's basketball

Rainbow Wahine Classic Champions
- Conference: Pac-12 Conference
- Record: 20–11 (9–9 Pac-12)
- Head coach: Mark Trakh (1st of 2nd stint; 6th overall season)
- Assistant coaches: Jason Glover; Aarika Hughes; Blanche Alverson
- Home arena: Galen Center

2017–18 Pac-12 Conference women's basketball standings
	Conf.				Overall
Team	W		L	PCT	W		L	PCT
No. 6 Oregon †	16	–	2	.889	33	–	5	.868
No. 15 Stanford	14	–	3	.824	24	–	11	.686
No. 9 UCLA	14	–	4	.778	27	–	8	.771
No. 13 Oregon State	14	–	4	.778	26	–	8	.765
California	11	–	7	.611	21	–	11	.656
Arizona State	10	–	8	.556	22	–	13	.629
USC	9	–	9	.500	20	–	11	.645
Utah	8	–	10	.444	18	–	14	.563
Colorado	5	–	13	.278	15	–	16	.484
Washington State	3	–	14	.176	10	–	20	.333
Arizona	2	–	16	.111	6	–	24	.200
Washington	1	–	17	.056	7	–	23	.233
† 2018 Pac-12 Tournament winner As of 26 March 2018; Rankings from AP Poll

The 2017–18 USC Trojans women's basketball team represented the University of Southern California during the 2017–18 NCAA Division I women's basketball season. The Trojans, led by first year head coach, 6th overall Mark Trakh, played their home games at the Galen Center and were members of the Pac-12 Conference. They finished the season 20–11, 9–9 in Pac-12 play to finish in seventh place. They defeated Washington State in the first round before losing to Stanford in the quarterfinals of the Pac-12 women's basketball tournament to Stanford. They would have clinched the automatic berth to the 2018 Women's National Invitation Tournament, but declined to participate, despite being the highest-ranked non-NCAA team in the Pac-12.

== Previous season ==
They finished the season 14–16, 5–13 in Pac-12 play to finish in a 4-way tie for ninth place. They lost in the first round Pac-12 women's basketball tournament to California. After that game, Coach Cynthia Cooper-Dyke resigned.

== Roster ==
2017–18 USC Trojans women's basketball team
Players
Coaches

Pos.	#	Name	Height	Year	Previous school	Hometown
G	0	Shalexxus Aaron (injured)	6 ft 1 in (1.85 m)	Fr	Martin Luther King HS	Apple Valley, CA
G	1	Jordan Adams	6 ft 1 in (1.85 m)	GS	Mater Dei HS	Irvine, CA
G	3	Minyon Moore	5 ft 8 in (1.73 m)	So	Salesian HS	Rodeo, CA
G	4	Mariya Moore (I) (redshirt)	6 ft 0 in (1.83 m)	Sr	Louisville	Hercules, California
F	5	Ja'Tavia Tapley	6 ft 4 in (1.93 m)	So	University Christian	Jacksonville, FL
F	13	Marguerite Effa	6 ft 3 in (1.91 m)	Jr	Fairfax	Los Angeles, CA
G	14	Sadie Edwards	5 ft 10 in (1.78 m)	Sr	Blair Academy; Connecticut	Meriden, CT
G	21	Aliyah Mazyck	5 ft 9 in (1.75 m)	Jr	Myers Park HS	Charlotte, NC
G	22	Kyerstin Galloway (W)	5 ft 5 in (1.65 m)	Fr	San Pedro HS	Los Angeles, CA
F	23	Asiah Jones (injured)	6 ft 3 in (1.91 m)	So	Woodmont HS	Piedmont, SC
G	30	Candela Abejón	6 ft 1 in (1.85 m)	Jr	Univ. de Ovideo	Asturias, Spain
F	32	Dani Milisic	6 ft 3 in (1.91 m)	RS So	Blacktown Girls HS	Sydney, Australia
F	35	Kristen Simon	6 ft 1 in (1.85 m)	Sr	Windward School	Gardena, CA

Head coach

- Mark Trakh (Long Beach State)

Assistant coach(es)

- Jason Glover (Grand Canyon)
- Aarika Hughes (USC)
- Blanche Alverson (Auburn)

Legend

- (C) Team captain
- (S) Suspended
- (I) Ineligible
- (W) Walk-on
- Injured
- Current redshirt

Roster
Last update: February 25, 2018

== Schedule ==
Date time, TV	Rank^{#}	Opponent^{#}	Result	Record	Site (attendance) city, state
Non-conference regular season
11/10/2017*; 4:00 pm		Montana State	W 98–47	1–0	Galen Center (614); Los Angeles, CA
11/13/2017*; 7:00 pm		at UC Riverside	W 64–46	2–0	SRC Arena (694); Riverside, CA
11/17/2017*; 7:00 pm		at Santa Clara	W 64–43	3–0	Leavey Center (395); Santa Clara, CA
11/20/2017*; 7:00 pm		Long Beach State	W 75–60	4–0	Galen Center (790); Los Angeles, CA
11/24/2017*; 5:00 pm		vs. Purdue; Rainbow Wahine Classic	W 58–46	5–0	Stan Sheriff Center; Honolulu, HI
11/25/2017*; 5:00 pm		vs. Marist; Rainbow Wahine Classic	W 78–57	6–0	Stan Sheriff Center; Honolulu, HI
11/26/2017*; 7:00 pm		at Hawaii; Rainbow Wahine Classic	W 71–60	7–0	Stan Sheriff Center (1,700); Honolulu, HI
12/01/2017*; 7:00 pm		at Loyola Marymount	W 80–70	8–0	Gersten Pavilion (445); Los Angeles, CA
12/15/2017*; 7:00 pm, P12N		No. 19 Texas A&M	L 74–75	8–1	Galen Center (508); Los Angeles, CA
12/19/2017*; 2:30 pm		vs. Middle Tennessee; UTRGV Holiday Classic	W 72–57	9–1	UTRGV Fieldhouse (89); Edinburg, TX
12/20/2017*; 5:00 pm		at Texas–Rio Grande Valley; UTRGV Holiday Classic	W 71–64	10–1	UTRGV Fieldhouse (528); Edinburg, TX
Pac-12 regular season
12/29/2017; 6:00 pm		at No. 20 California	L 64–76	10–2 (0–1)	Haas Pavilion (2,217); Berkeley, CA
12/31/2017; 1:00 pm, P12N		at Stanford	L 65–72	10–3 (0–2)	Maples Pavilion (2,494); Stanford, CA
01/05/2018; 8:00 pm, P12N		No. 9 Oregon	L 66–70	10–4 (0–3)	Galen Center (670); Los Angeles, CA
01/07/2018; 1:00 pm, P12N		No. 16 Oregon State	W 65–61	11–4 (1–3)	Galen Center (592); Los Angeles, CA
01/12/2018; 5:00 pm, P12N		at Colorado	W 86–51	12–4 (2–3)	Coors Events Center (1,533); Boulder, CO
01/14/2018; 11:00 am, P12N		at Utah	W 58–47	13–4 (3–3)	Jon M. Huntsman Center (1,574); Salt Lake City, UT
01/19/2018; 8:00 pm, P12N		Stanford	L 55–59	13–5 (3–4)	Galen Center (882); Los Angeles, CA
01/21/2018; 1:00 pm, P12N		No. 21 California	L 59–62	13–6 (3–5)	Galen Center (1,728); Los Angeles, CA
01/26/2018; 7:00 pm		at Washington State	W 73–72	14–6 (4–5)	Beasley Coliseum (803); Pullman, WA
01/28/2018; 2:00 pm		at Washington	W 72–61	15–6 (5–5)	Alaska Airlines Arena (2,368); Seattle, WA
02/02/2018; 8:00 pm, P12N		at No. 9 UCLA; Rivalry	L 46–59	15–7 (5–6)	Pauley Pavilion (6,057); Los Angeles, CA
02/05/2018; 6:00 pm, P12N		UCLA; Rivalry	L 70–84	15–8 (5–7)	Galen Center (876); Los Angeles, CA
02/09/2018; 7:00 pm		No. 25 Arizona State	W 77–62	16–8 (6–7)	Galen Center (647); Los Angeles, CA
02/09/2018; 7:00 pm		Arizona	W 78–52	17–8 (7–7)	Galen Center (572); Los Angeles, CA
02/16/2018; 6:00 pm, P12N		at No. 9 Oregon	L 74–80 ^{2OT}	17–9 (7–8)	Matthew Knight Arena (2,494); Eugene, OR
02/18/2018; 1:00 pm, P12N		at No. 15 Oregon State	L 63–69	17–10 (7–9)	Gill Coliseum (4,942); Corvallis, OR
02/22/2018; 6:00 pm, P12N		Utah	W 53–52 ^{OT}	18–10 (8–9)	Galen Center (592); Los Angeles, CA
02/24/2018; 1:00 pm		Colorado	W 65–53	19–10 (9–9)	Galen Center (2,813); Los Angeles, CA
Pac-12 Women's Tournament
03/01/2017; 6:00 pm, P12N	(7)	vs. (10) Washington State; First Round	W 47–44	20–10	KeyArena; Seattle, WA
03/02/2017; 6:00 pm, P12N	(7)	vs. (2) No. 16 Stanford; Quarterfinals	L 59–69	20–11	KeyArena; Seattle, WA
*Non-conference game. ^{#}Rankings from AP Poll. (#) Tournament seedings in parentheses. All times are in Pacific Time.

== Rankings ==
2017–18 NCAA Division I women's basketball rankings

Regular season polls
Poll	Pre- Season	Week 2	Week 3	Week 4	Week 5	Week 6	Week 7	Week 8	Week 9	Week 10	Week 11	Week 12	Week 13	Week 14	Week 15	Week 16	Week 17	Week 18	Week 19	Final
AP	NR	NR	RV	RV	RV	RV	RV	RV	NR	NR	NR	NR	NR	NR	RV	RV	NR	NR		N/A
Coaches	NR	N/A	NR	RV	RV	RV	RV	RV	NR	NR	NR	NR	NR	NR	NR	NR	NR	NR		

Legend
	Increase in ranking
	Decrease in ranking
	No change
(RV)	Received votes
(NR)	Not ranked

== See also ==
- 2017–18 USC Trojans men's basketball team
