= 2017–18 Washington Huskies women's basketball team =

Intercollegiate basketball season

2017–18 Washington Huskies women's basketball
- Conference: Pac-12 Conference
- Record: 7–23 (1–17 Pac-12)
- Head coach: Jody Wynn (1st season)
- Associate head coach: Derek Wynn
- Assistant coaches: Michelle Augustavo; Paul Reed
- Home arena: Alaska Airlines Arena

2017–18 Pac-12 Conference women's basketball standings
	Conf.				Overall
Team	W		L	PCT	W		L	PCT
No. 6 Oregon †	16	–	2	.889	33	–	5	.868
No. 15 Stanford	14	–	3	.824	24	–	11	.686
No. 9 UCLA	14	–	4	.778	27	–	8	.771
No. 13 Oregon State	14	–	4	.778	26	–	8	.765
California	11	–	7	.611	21	–	11	.656
Arizona State	10	–	8	.556	22	–	13	.629
USC	9	–	9	.500	20	–	11	.645
Utah	8	–	10	.444	18	–	14	.563
Colorado	5	–	13	.278	15	–	16	.484
Washington State	3	–	14	.176	10	–	20	.333
Arizona	2	–	16	.111	6	–	24	.200
Washington	1	–	17	.056	7	–	23	.233
† 2018 Pac-12 Tournament winner As of 26 March 2018; Rankings from AP Poll

The 2017–18 Washington Huskies women's basketball team represented University of Washington during the 2017–18 NCAA Division I women's basketball season. The Huskies were led by first-year head coach Jody Wynn. They played their home games at Alaska Airlines Arena at Hec Edmundson Pavilion in Seattle, Washington as members of the Pac-12 Conference. They finished the season 7–23, 1–17 in Pac-12 play to finish in last place. They lost in the first round of the Pac-12 women's basketball tournament to California.

== Previous season ==
The 2016–17 Huskies finished the 2016–17 season 29–6, 15–3 in Pac-12 play.

== Roster ==
2017–18 Washington Huskies women's basketball team
Players
Coaches

Pos.	#	Name	Height	Year	Previous school	Hometown
F	1	Hannah Johnson	6 ft 1 in (1.85 m)	RS Jr	Bishop Alemany	Los Angeles, CA
F	2	Fapou Semebene	6 ft 1 in (1.85 m)	Fr	View Park	Los Angeles, CA
F	3	Mai-Loni Henson	6 ft 1 in (1.85 m)	So	La Jolla Country Day	Temecula, CA
G	4	Amber Melgoza	5 ft 10 in (1.78 m)	So	Santa Barbara	Santa Barbara, CA
G	5	Natalie Romeo	5 ft 7 in (1.7 m)	Sr	Carondelet; Nebraska	Martinez, CA
G	11	Kierra Collier	5 ft 6 in (1.68 m)	Fr	Truman	Kansas City, MO
G	15	Montana Hagstrom	5 ft 7 in (1.7 m)	So	Sammamish; Bellevue College	Bellevue, WA
F	22	Khayla Rooks	6 ft 1 in (1.85 m)	Fr	Mission Hills	San Marcos, CA
G	24	Jenna Moser	5 ft 6 in (1.68 m)	Sr	Colton	Colton, WA
F	32	Gigi Garcia	6 ft 2 in (1.88 m)	RS Fr	C. K. McClatchy	Sacramento, CA
C	34	Deja Strother	6 ft 5 in (1.96 m)	Jr	Inglemoor	Kenmore, WA
G	35	Alexis Griggsby	5 ft 9 in (1.75 m)	Fr	Sierra Canyon	Northridge, CA
G	42	Mackenzie Wieburg	5 ft 9 in (1.75 m)	Sr	Issaquah	Sammamish, WA
G	44	Missy Peterson	5 ft 11 in (1.8 m)	Fr	Edmonds-Woodway	Edmonds, WA

Head coach

- Jody Wynn (USC)

Assistant coach(es)

- Derek Wynn (AHC, Cal State Fullerton)
- Michelle Augustavo (Washington)
- Paul Reed (Langston)

Legend

- (C) Team captain
- (S) Suspended
- (I) Ineligible
- (W) Walk-on
- Injured
- Current redshirt

Roster
Last update: January 16, 2018

== Schedule ==
Date time, TV	Rank^{#}	Opponent^{#}	Result	Record	Site (attendance) city, state
Non-conference regular season
11/12/2017*; 1:00 pm		Idaho State	L 59–79	0–1	Alaska Airlines Arena (1,479); Seattle, WA
11/15/2017*; 7:00 pm		BYU	W 80–72	1–1	Alaska Airlines Arena (1,442); Seattle, WA
11/19/2017*; 8:00 am		at No. 9 Ohio State	L 76–85	1–2	Value City Arena (4,335); Columbus, OH
11/24/2017*; 11:00 am		vs. Creighton; South Point Thanksgiving Shootout	W 67–64	2–2	South Point Arena (175); Enterprise, NV
11/25/2017*; 1:15 pm		vs. No. 2 Texas; South Point Thanksgiving Shootout	L 68–92	2–3	South Point Arena (288); Enterprise, NV
12/01/2017*; 6:00 pm		at Idaho	W 81–69	3–3	Memorial Gym (667); Moscow, ID
12/03/2017*; 1:30 pm, P12N		Portland; Homecoming	W 93–67	4–3	Alaska Airlines Arena (1,410); Seattle, WA
12/07/2017*; 6:00 pm		at Boise State	L 62–85	4–4	Taco Bell Arena (806); Boise, ID
12/10/2017*; 12:00 pm		Grand Canyon	W 79–65	5–4	Alaska Airlines Arena (962); Seattle, WA
12/17/2017*; 1:00 pm		vs. North Carolina; Carolinas Challenge	L 78–90	5–5	Myrtle Beach Convention Center (500); Myrtle Beach, SC
12/20/2017*; 7:00 pm		Seattle	W 84–76 ^{OT}	6–5	Alaska Airlines Arena (1,526); Seattle, WA
Pac-12 regular season
12/29/2017; 2:00 pm		at No. 17 Oregon State	L 63–75	6–6 (0–1)	Gill Coliseum (4,247); Corvallis, OR
12/31/2017; 1:00 pm, P12N		at No. 10 Oregon	L 83–94	6–7 (0–2)	Matthew Knight Arena (3,322); Eugene, OR
01/05/2018; 6:00 pm, P12N		Utah	L 65–74	6–8 (0–3)	Alaska Airlines Arena (1,746); Seattle, WA
01/07/2018; 2:00 pm		Colorado	L 61–66	6–9 (0–4)	Alaska Airlines Arena (2,141); Seattle, WA
01/12/2018; 8:00 pm, P12N		at No. 24 California	L 60–69	6–10 (0–5)	Haas Pavilion (1,478); Berkeley, CA
01/14/2018; 3:00 pm, P12N		at Stanford	L 45–71	6–11 (0–6)	Maples Pavilion (3,052); Stanford, CA
01/17/2018; 7:00 pm, P12N		at Washington State; Rivalry	L 75–78 ^{OT}	6–12 (0–7)	Beasley Coliseum (1,199); Pullman, WA
01/21/2018; 1:00 pm, P12N		Washington State; Rivalry	W 56–49	7–12 (1–7)	Alaska Airlines Arena (3,603); Seattle, WA
01/26/2018; 7:00 pm, P12N		No. 13 UCLA	L 69–86	7–13 (1–8)	Alaska Airlines Arena (1,688); Seattle, WA
01/28/2018; 2:00 pm		USC	L 61–72	7–14 (1–9)	Alaska Airlines Arena (2,368); Seattle, WA
02/02/2018; 7:00 pm, P12N		at Arizona State	L 41–61	7–15 (1–10)	Wells Fargo Arena (2,078); Tempe, AZ
02/04/2018; 11:00 am		at Arizona	L 70–72	7–16 (1–11)	McKale Center (1,886); Tucson, AZ
02/09/2018; 8:00 pm, P12N		No. 9 Oregon	L 63–76	7–17 (1–12)	Alaska Airlines Arena (2,177); Seattle, WA
02/11/2018; 3:00 pm, P12N		No. 16 Oregon State	L 57–95	7–18 (1–13)	Alaska Airlines Arena (2,589); Seattle, WA
02/16/2018; 6:00 pm		at Colorado	L 56–76	7–19 (1–14)	Coors Events Center (1,743); Boulder, CO
02/18/2018; 1:00 pm, P12N		at Utah	L 46–81	7–20 (1–15)	Jon M. Huntsman Center (1,927); Salt Lake City, UT
02/23/2018; 8:00 pm, P12N		No. 16 Stanford	L 79–86	7–21 (1–16)	Alaska Airlines Arena (1,848); Seattle, WA
02/25/2018; 3:00 pm, P12N		California	L 67–83	7–22 (1–17)	Alaska Airlines Arena (2,354); Seattle, WA
Pac-12 Women's Tournament
03/01/2018; 2:00 pm, P12N	(12)	vs. (5) California; First Round	L 68–71	7–23	KeyArena (3,532); Seattle, WA
*Non-conference game. ^{#}Rankings from AP Poll. (#) Tournament seedings in parentheses. All times are in Pacific Time.

== Rankings ==
Regular season polls
Poll	Pre- season	Week 2	Week 3	Week 4	Week 5	Week 6	Week 7	Week 8	Week 9	Week 10	Week 11	Week 12	Week 13	Week 14	Week 15	Week 16	Week 17	Week 18	Week 19	Final
AP	RV	NR	NR	NR	NR	NR	NR	NR	NR	NR	NR	NR	NR	NR	NR	NR	NR	NR		
Coaches	25	N/A	RV	NR	NR	NR	NR	NR	NR	NR	NR	NR	NR	NR	NR	NR	NR	NR		

Legend
	Increase in ranking
	Decrease in ranking
	Not ranked previous week
(RV)	Received votes

== See also ==
- 2017–18 Washington Huskies men's basketball team
