= Willis Adams =

American football player (born 1956)

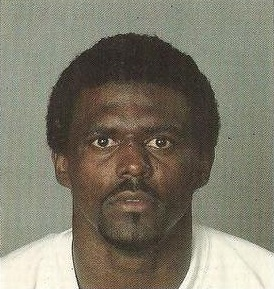

No. 80
- Position: Wide receiver

Personal information
- Born: August 22, 1956 (age 70); Weimar, Texas, U.S.
- Listed height: 6 ft 2 in (1.88 m)
- Listed weight: 194 lb (88 kg)

Career information
- High school: Schulenburg (Schulenburg, Texas)
- College: Houston
- NFL draft: 1979: 1st round, 20th overall pick

Career history
- Cleveland Browns (1979–1985)

Career NFL statistics
- Games played: 75
- Receptions: 61
- Receiving yards: 962
- Receiving TDs: 2
- Stats at Pro Football Reference

Willis Dean Adams (born August 22, 1956) is an American former professional football player who was a wide receiver for the Cleveland Browns of the National Football League (NFL). Adams attended Schulenburg High School in Schulenburg, Texas.

After graduation from high school, Adams first attended Navarro Junior College in Corsicana, Texas, before enrolling at the University of Houston.

In his NFL career, Adams recorded 61 receptions, 962 yards, and two touchdowns.

After retiring from the NFL, Adams became a physical education teacher.
