= Schulenburg High School (Texas) =

Public school in the United States

Location
- 150 College Street; Schulenburg, Texas 78956; United States; 29.685489°N 96.905206°W

Information
- School type: Public high school
- School district: Schulenburg Independent School District
- Principal: Jerrod Barton
- Teaching staff: 35.94 (FTE)
- Grades: 6-12
- Enrollment: 393 (2023–2024)
- Student to teacher ratio: 10.93
- Colors: Orange & Black
- Athletics conference: UIL Class 2A
- Mascot: Shorthorn/Ladyhorn
- Yearbook: The Round Up
- Website: Schlenburg High School

Schulenburg High School or Schulenburg Secondary School is a public high school located in Schulenburg, Texas (USA) and classified as a 2A school by the UIL. It is part of the Schulenburg Independent School District located in south central Fayette County. In 2015, the school was rated "Met Standard" by the Texas Education Agency.

== Athletics ==
The Schulenburg Shorthorns compete in these sports -

- Baseball
- Basketball
- Cross Country
- Football
- Golf
- Powerlifting
- Softball
- Track and Field
- Volleyball
- Tennis

=== State Titles ===
- Football -
  - 1972(1A), 1991(2A), 1992(2A)
- Girls Golf -
  - 1995(1A)
- Boys Track -
  - 1975(1A), 2016(3A), 2017(3A)
- Girls Track -
  - 1993(2A)
- Volleyball -
  - 2014(2A)

== Academics ==
=== State Titles ===
- One Act Play
  - 1948(B), 1950(B), 1951(B), 1960(3A), 1964(1A)
