= 2017–18 Texas–Rio Grande Valley Vaqueros women's basketball team =

Intercollegiate basketball season

2017–18 Texas–Rio Grande Valley Vaqueros women's basketball
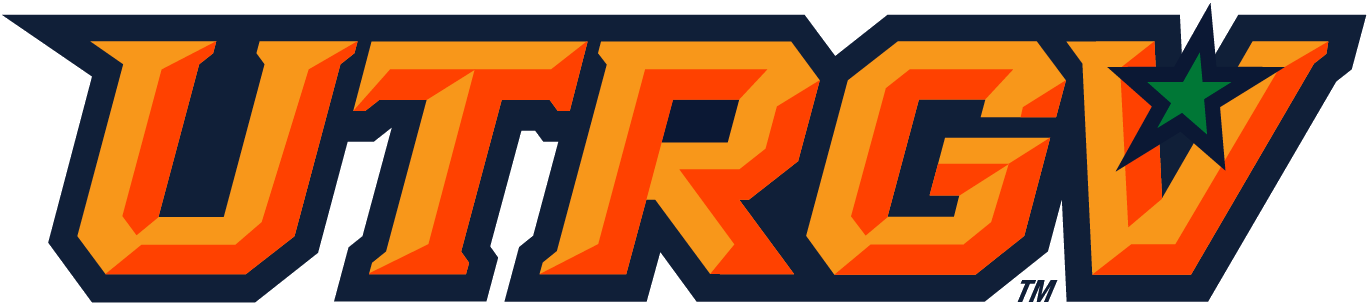
- Conference: Western Athletic Conference
- Record: 14–16 (4–10 WAC)
- Head coach: Larry Tidwell (5th season)
- Assistant coaches: Anthony Anderson; Kaylena Andersen; Yannick Denson
- Home arena: UTRGV Fieldhouse

2017–18 WAC women's basketball standings
	Conf.				Overall
Team	W		L	PCT	W		L	PCT
New Mexico State	11	–	3	.786	18	–	12	.600
Cal State Bakersfield	10	–	4	.714	18	–	13	.581
Seattle U †	9	–	5	.643	18	–	14	.563
Grand Canyon	9	–	5	.643	16	–	14	.533
UMKC	7	–	7	.500	11	–	19	.367
Utah Valley	5	–	9	.357	11	–	19	.367
UT Rio Grande Valley	4	–	10	.286	14	–	16	.467
Chicago State	1	–	13	.071	1	–	29	.033
† 2018 WAC tournament winner As of March 16, 2018; Rankings from AP poll

The 2017–18 Texas–Rio Grande Valley Vaqueros women's basketball team represented the University of Texas Rio Grande Valley during the 2017–18 NCAA Division I women's basketball season. This was head coach Larry Tidwell's fifth season along with the third under the UTRGV label. The Vaqueros played their home games at the UTRGV Fieldhouse and were members of the Western Athletic Conference. The team finished seventh in the WAC after going 4–10 while finishing 14–16 overall.

On April 21, 2018, Tidwell resigned from his position to accept the job for the Chief of Staff for the women's basketball program at Texas Tech. He finished at UTRGV with a 5-year record of 85–75

== Roster ==
2017–18 UTRGV Vaqueros women's basketball team
Players
Coaches

Pos.	#	Name	Height	Year	Previous school	Hometown
G	1	Amara Graham	5 ft 6 in (1.68 m)	RS Fr	Gwendolyn Brooks College Prep	Chicago, IL
G	2	Emily Azubell	5 ft 9 in (1.75 m)	RS Sr	Robert Vela	Edinburg, TX
G	3	Daniela Azubell	5 ft 7 in (1.7 m)	RS Jr	Robert Vela	Edinburg, TX
G	4	Idil Türk	5 ft 9 in (1.75 m)	Jr	Bodwell	Istanbul, Turkey
G	5	Jameka Dowell	5 ft 8 in (1.73 m)	Jr	Lebanon	Lebanon, TN
G	10	Valeria Tapia	5 ft 7 in (1.7 m)	Fr	Saint Joseph Academy	Matamoros, Tamaulipas, Mexico
G	11	Quynne Huggins	5 ft 11 in (1.8 m)	Jr	Millennium; Mesa CC	Goodyear, AZ
G	12	Shaiann Tramble	5 ft 7 in (1.7 m)	Jr	Shawnee; Highland CC	Shawnee, OK
G	14	Brianna Pitre	5 ft 8 in (1.73 m)	So	Sabino	Tucson, AZ
G	15	Nichele Hyman	5 ft 10 in (1.78 m)	Jr	Clovis	Clovis, NM
F	21	Krisynthia Sampson	6 ft 0 in (1.83 m)	Jr	South Mountain; Arizona Western College	Phoenix, AZ
F	23	Alicia McCray	6 ft 0 in (1.83 m)	RS Sr	Trinity Christian Academy; Florida A&M	West Palm Beach, FL
G	24	Natalia Ready	5 ft 10 in (1.78 m)	Jr	Parkview; Fort Scott CC	Little Rock, AR
F	33	Marie-Fatou Gueye	6 ft 0 in (1.83 m)	RS Sr	Université Lumière Lyon II	Paris, France
F	34	Megan Johnson	5 ft 10 in (1.78 m)	So	St. Francis Xavier College	Newcastle, Australia
F	43	Jasauen Beard	6 ft 1 in (1.85 m)	RS Jr	Midwest City	Midwest City, OK
F	44	Laura Van Tilburg	6 ft 3 in (1.91 m)	RS Sr	Weslaco	Weslaco, TX

Head coach

- Larry Tidwell (Austin College)

Assistant coach(es)

- Anthony Anderson (FIU)
- Kaylena Andersen (Arkansas–Fort Smith)
- Yannick Denson (Lamar)

Legend

- (C) Team captain
- (S) Suspended
- (I) Ineligible
- (W) Walk-on
- Injured
- Current redshirt

Roster

== Schedule ==
Date time, TV	Rank^{#}	Opponent^{#}	Result	Record	Site (attendance) city, state
Non-conference regular season
11/10/2017*; 2:00 pm		vs. Concordia (TX); Islanders Classic	W 67–49	1–0	Dugan Wellness Center (121); Corpus Christi, TX
11/11/2017*; 5:00 pm		vs. Trinity; Islanders Classic	W 62–57	2–0	Dugan Wellness Center (121); Corpus Christi, TX
11/14/2017*; 7:00 pm		Texas A&M–Corpus Christi	W 56–53	3–0	UTRGV Fieldhouse (328); Edinburg, TX
11/17/2017*; 7:00 pm		at Oklahoma State	L 38–80	3–1	Gallagher-Iba Arena (1,441); Stillwater, OK
11/21/2017*; 7:00 pm		Texas Lutheran	W 78–43	4–1	UTRGV Fieldhouse (379); Edinburg, TX
11/25/2017*; 3:00 pm		Florida A&M; Feast of the Border	W 51–38	5–1	UTRGV Fieldhouse (272); Edinburg, TX
11/26/2017*; 3:00 pm		Prairie View A&M; Feast of the Border	W 78–62	6–1	UTRGV Fieldhouse (240); Edinburg, TX
11/29/2017*; 7:00 pm		at Texas A&M–Corpus Christi	L 41–71	6–2	Dugan Wellness Center (540); Corpus Christi, TX
12/01/2017*; 7:00 pm		UMass; Battle on the Border	W 67–59	7–2	UTRGV Fieldhouse (273); Edinburg, TX
12/02/2017*; 3:00 pm		UTSA; Battle on the Border	W 70–58	8–2	UTRGV Fieldhouse (485); Edinburg, TX
12/05/2017*; 7:00 pm, MidcoSN		at North Dakota State	W 82–79	9–2	Scheels Center (609); Fargo, ND
12/06/2017; 7:00 pm		Wisconsin	L 54–82	9–3	Kohl Center (2,809); Madison, WI
12/17/2017*; 2:00 pm		at Texas Tech	L 64–80	9–4	Lubbock Municipal Coliseum (2,292); Lubbock, TX
12/19/2017*; 7:00 pm		Canisius; UTRGV Holiday Classic	W 63–46	10–4	UTRGV Fieldhouse (365); Edinburg, TX
12/20/2017*; 7:00 pm		USC; UTRGV Holiday Classic	L 64–71	10–5	UTRGV Fieldhouse (528); Edinburg, TX
WAC regular season
01/06/2018; 7:00 pm		UMKC	L 52–54	10–6 (0–1)	UTRGV Fieldhouse (501); Edinburg, TX
01/11/2018; 7:00 pm		Cal State Bakersfield	L 64–67 ^{OT}	10–7 (0–2)	UTRGV Fieldhouse (402); Edinburg, TX
01/13/2018; 7:00 pm		Grand Canyon	L 59–65	10–8 (0–3)	UTRGV Fieldhouse (409); Edinburg, TX
01/18/2018; 12:00 pm		at Utah Valley	L 60–69	10–9 (0–4)	Lockhart Arena (719); Orem, UT
01/20/2018; 6:00 pm		at Seattle	L 56–64	10–10 (0–5)	Connolly Center (860); Seattle, WA
01/27/2018; 7:00 pm		Chicago State	W 81–44	11–10 (1–5)	UTRGV Fieldhouse (750); Edinburg, TX
02/03/2018; 7:00 pm		New Mexico State	L 77–79 ^{OT}	11–11 (1–6)	UTRGV Fieldhouse (731); Edinburg, TX
02/08/2018; 8:00 pm		at Grand Canyon	L 58–59	11–12 (1–7)	GCU Arena (502); Phoenix, AZ
02/10/2018; 3:00 pm		at Cal State Bakersfield	L 30–71	11–13 (1–8)	Icardo Center (421); Bakersfield, CA
02/15/2018; 7:00 pm		Seattle	W 69–67 ^{OT}	12–13 (2–8)	UTRGV Fieldhouse (470); Edinburg, TX
02/17/2018; 8:00 pm		Utah Valley	W 71–64 ^{OT}	13–13 (3–8)	UTRGV Fieldhouse (761); Edinburg, TX
02/22/2018; 7:00 pm		at UMKC	L 59–79	13–14 (3–9)	Swinney Recreation Center (150); Kansas City, MO
02/24/2018; 2:00 pm		at Chicago State	W 69–62	14–14 (4–9)	Jones Convocation Center (163); Chicago, IL
03/03/2018; 3:00 pm		at New Mexico State	L 56–72	14–15 (4–10)	Pan American Center (1,564); Las Cruces, NM
WAC Women's Tournament
03/07/2018; 4:00 pm	(7)	vs. (2) Cal State Bakersfield; Quarterfinals	L 59–70	14–16	Orleans Arena; Paradise, NV
*Non-conference game. ^{#}Rankings from AP Poll. (#) Tournament seedings in parentheses. All times are in Central.

== See also ==
2017–18 Texas–Rio Grande Valley Vaqueros men's basketball team
