= Larry Tidwell =

American basketball coach (born 1953)

Current position
- Title: Head Basketball Coach
- Team: Bellevue High School

Biographical details
- Born: May 14, 1953 (age 73); Sanger, Texas
- Education: Austin College

Playing career
- 1971–1972: TCU

Coaching career (HC unless noted)
- 1978–1983: Frisco HS
- 1984–1992: Schulenburg High School
- 1992–1998: Baylor (asst.)
- 1998–1999: Mexia HS
- 1999–2007: TCU (assoc. HC)
- 2007–2013: Lamar
- 2013–2018: Texas–Pan American/Rio Grande Valley
- 2019–2024: Kansas (assoc. HC)
- 2024-present: Schulenburg High School

Head coaching record
- Overall: 161–97 (.624)

Accomplishments and honors

Championships
- 2009–2010 Southland Conference Regular Season and Conference Tournament champions

Awards
- Texas Girls Coaches Association Margaret McKown Distinguished Service Award (2008); Texas Association of Basketball Coaches Coach of the Year (2010); Kedric Couch – Austin College Alumni – Coach of the Year Award (2010); Texas Association of Basketball Coach Division I Women's Basketball Coach of the Year(2015)

Larry Dan Tidwell (born May 14, 1953) is the head coach for the Schulenburg High School women’s basketball team. Before moving to Kansas, he served as women's basketball head coach from 2013–2018 at the University of Texas-Rio Grande Valley, having been retained when his former institution, the University of Texas–Pan American (UTPA), merged with the University of Texas at Brownsville. Prior to this position, he was head coach of the Lamar Lady Cardinals basketball team for six seasons from 2007–2013, as well as the Lamar athletics director from June 2010 to May 2011.

== Lamar ==
In the 2009–10 season, the Lady Cardinals posted a 26–8 overall record and a 13–3 mark in the Southland Conference. Lamar won the Southland Conference regular-season and tournament titles, as the Lady Cards advanced to the NCAA Tournament for the first time since 1991. The 26 wins were the second-most in school history. Tidwell was named the Texas Basketball Coaches Association Division I Women's Basketball Coach of the Year for his efforts. One of Tidwell's 2009–10 players, Jenna Plumley, was named Southland Conference Player of the Year and Newcomer of the Year. Plumley was among the national leaders in three–pointers, assists, and steals.

The Lady Cardinals almost matched the 2009–10 record the following season finishing 25–8 overall and 13–3 in conference. The Lady Cardinals also competed in the WNIT. After his Lady Cardinals competed in the 2013 Women's Basketball Invitational tournament finishing the season with a 22–11 overall record, Larry Tidwell resigned as Lady Cardinals head basketball coach on April 4, 2013 to take a similar position at UTPA. Tidwell's teams had a 128–66 overall record in his six seasons as head coach of the Lady Cardinals. He ranks first on Lamar's all-time list for wins.

== Texas-Pan American and UTRGV ==
Tidwell came to UTPA in 2013 after serving six seasons as head coach of the Lamar Lady Cardinals basketball team. He left Lamar as that program's winningest coach in school history winning 128 victories and making three post season appearances (NCAA, WNIT, and WBI). In his first season at Texas-Pan American, his team tied program records for wins in a season and for conference wins in a season. Tidwell's 2014–15 team showed continued improvement finishing the season with a 19–15 overall record and a conference record of 9–5. Competing in the 2015 WAC women's basketball tournament, the Broncs reached the championship game where they fell to New Mexico State. Under Coach Tidwell, the Broncs received an invitation to the 2015 Women's Basketball Invitational, the first postseason invitation in the program's history. \

== Head coaching record ==
Record table
| Season | Team | Overall | Conference | Standing | Postseason |
|---|---|---|---|---|---|
Lamar Lady Cardinals (Southland Conference) (2007–2013)
| 2007–08 | Lamar | 19–13 | 10–6 | 2nd | |
| 2008–09 | Lamar | 20–11 | 10–6 | 3rd | |
| 2009–10 | Lamar | 26–8 | 13–3 | 1st | NCAA First Round |
| 2010–11 | Lamar | 25–8 | 13–3 | 2nd | WNIT First Round |
| 2011–12 | Lamar | 16–15 | 8–8 | 3rd (East) | |
| 2012–13 | Lamar | 22–11 | 12–6 | 3rd | WBI Second Round |
| Lamar: | | 128–66 (.660) | 66–32 (.673) | | |
Texas-Pan American Broncs/Texas–Rio Grande Valley Vaqueros (Western Athletic Conference) (2013–2018)
| 2013–14 | Texas-Pan American | 14–16 | 8–8 | 5th | |
| 2014–15 | Texas-Pan American | 19–15 | 9–5 | 3rd | WBI First Round |
| 2015–16 | Texas–Rio Grande Valley | 19–14 | 9–5 | 2nd | WNIT First Round |
| 2016–17 | Texas–Rio Grande Valley | 19–14 | 8–6 | 4th | WBI Second Round |
| 2017–18 | Texas–Rio Grande Valley | 14–16 | 4–10 | 6th | |
| Texas-Pan American/Rio Grande Valley: | | 85–75 (.531) | 38–34 (.528) | | |
| Total: | | 213–141 (.602) | | | |
National champion Postseason invitational champion Conference regular season champion Conference regular season and conference tournament champion Division regular season champion Division regular season and conference tournament champion Conference tournament champion

== Awards ==
In 2010, the Texas Association of Basketball Coaches (TABC) named Tidwell "Division I Coach of the Year" for women's college basketball. The honor was repeated at the conclusion of the 2014–15 season with Tidwell being honored as the TABC "Division I Coach of the Year" for women's division I basketball for a second time.

In 2002, he earned AFLAC National Assistant Coach of the Year.

He is a member of the Austin College and Sanger High School's Halls of Fame.
