= Anthony Forest =

Anthony Forest may refer to:

- Bishop Anthony Forest, namesake of Bishop Forest High School
- Anthony Forest (rugby); see CS Bourgoin-Jallieu

== See also ==
- Anthony Forrest (disambiguation)
