= Bishop Forest High School =

Location
- 100 Ranger Drive; Schulenburg, (Fayette County), Texas 78956; United States
- Coordinates: 29.67554°N 96.89899°W

Information
- Type: Private, Coeducational
- Religious affiliation: Roman Catholic
- Founded: 1956
- Status: Closed
- Closed: 1989
- Grades: 9–12
- Colors: Green and white
- Team name: Rangers
- Yearbook: Silvascope

Bishop Forest High School was a four-year Roman Catholic High School located at 100 Ranger Dr, Schulenburg, Texas.

== History ==
Bishop Forest High School was founded in 1956, and was named after Bishop Anthony Forest who, born in France, spent most of his time working in the United States, especially in Texas. He worked in the area for 32 years before he was appointed as the 3rd Bishop of San Antonio in 1895.

The school colors were kelly green and white. The team name was the Rangers.

== Notable alumni ==
- Hugo Hollas
- Joe Mikulik
