= 2017–18 Seattle Redhawks women's basketball team =

Intercollegiate basketball season

2017–18 Seattle Redhawks women's basketball

WAC Tournament Champions

NCAA Women's Tournament, first round
- Conference: Western Athletic Conference
- Record: 18–15 (9–5 WAC)
- Head coach: Suzy Barcomb (2nd season)
- Assistant coaches: Joddie Gleason; Skip Gleason; Toni Thomas
- Home arena: Connolly Center

2017–18 WAC women's basketball standings
| | Conf. | | | | Overall |
| Team | W | | L | PCT | W | | L | PCT |
|---|---|---|---|---|---|---|---|---|
| New Mexico State | 11 | – | 3 | .786 | 18 | – | 12 | .600 |
| Cal State Bakersfield | 10 | – | 4 | .714 | 18 | – | 13 | .581 |
| Seattle U † | 9 | – | 5 | .643 | 18 | – | 14 | .563 |
| Grand Canyon | 9 | – | 5 | .643 | 16 | – | 14 | .533 |
| UMKC | 7 | – | 7 | .500 | 11 | – | 19 | .367 |
| Utah Valley | 5 | – | 9 | .357 | 11 | – | 19 | .367 |
| UT Rio Grande Valley | 4 | – | 10 | .286 | 14 | – | 16 | .467 |
| Chicago State | 1 | – | 13 | .071 | 1 | – | 29 | .033 |
† 2018 WAC tournament winner As of March 16, 2018; Rankings from AP poll

The 2017–18 Seattle U Redhawks women's basketball team represented Seattle University during the 2017–18 NCAA Division I women's basketball season. The Redhawks, led by second year head coach Suzy Barcomb, played their home games at the Connolly Center and were members of the Western Athletic Conference. They finished the season 18–15, 9–5 in WAC play to finish in a tie for third place. They won the WAC women's tournament for the first time in school history by defeating Cal State Bakersfield to earn an automatic trip to their first NCAA women's tournament, where they lost to Oregon in the first round.

== Roster ==
2017–18 Seattle Redhawks women's basketball team
Players
Coaches

| Pos. | # | Name | Height | Year | Previous school | Hometown |
|---|---|---|---|---|---|---|
| G | 3 | Jacinta Beckley | 6 ft 0 in (1.83 m) | Sr | Paraparaumu College | Wellington, New Zealand |
| G | 4 | McKenzi Williams | 5 ft 5 in (1.65 m) | Fr | Auburn Riverside | Auburn, WA |
| G | 12 | Carla Bieg | 5 ft 6 in (1.68 m) | So | Escola Betania-Patmos | Barcelona, Spain |
| F | 14 | Leilani Peat | 6 ft 0 in (1.83 m) | Fr | Corona Del Sol | Tempe, AZ |
| G | 15 | Kamira Sanders | 5 ft 7 in (1.7 m) | So | Enterprise | Redding, CA |
| G/F | 22 | Ashlyn Lewey | 6 ft 0 in (1.83 m) | Sr | Mead | Spokane, WA |
| G | 23 | Madeline Dopplick | 5 ft 7 in (1.7 m) | Jr | Millikan; Mt. San Antonio College | Long Beach, CA |
| G/F | 24 | Alexis Montgomery | 5 ft 10 in (1.78 m) | RS Sr | Beaverton | Beaverton, OR |
| F | 25 | Leilia Orji | 6 ft 0 in (1.83 m) | Fr | Etiwanda | Rancho Cucamonga, CA |
| G | 31 | Genessa Bedoya | 5 ft 5 in (1.65 m) | So | Bishop Alemany | Santa Clarita, CA |
| G | 32 | Makenna Schoenhofer | 5 ft 10 in (1.78 m) | Fr | St. Bernard's Academy | Fortuna, CA |
| F | 35 | Delaney McCann | 6 ft 1 in (1.85 m) | RS Fr | Canyon; Humboldt State | Santa Clarita, CA |
| F/C | 41 | Kallin Spiller | 6 ft 3 in (1.91 m) | Fr | Lakeside | Seattle, WA |
| F/C | 43 | Joana Alves | 6 ft 3 in (1.91 m) | So | Escola Secundária Fernão Mendes Pinto | Lisbon, Portugal |

Head coach

- Suzy Barcomb (Washington)

Assistant coach(es)

- Joddie Gleason (Chico State)
- Skip Gleason (Chico State)
- Toni Thomas (Cal State Fullerton)

Legend

- (C) Team captain
- (S) Suspended
- (I) Ineligible
- (W) Walk-on
- Injured
- Current redshirt

Roster
Last update: March 13, 2018

== Schedule ==
| Date time, TV | Rank^{#} | Opponent^{#} | Result | Record | Site (attendance) city, state |
Exhibition
| 11/04/2017*; 4:00 pm | | Central Washington | W 104–57 | | Connolly Center (364); Seattle, WA |
Non-conference regular season
| 11/10/2017*; 6:00 pm | | Idaho State | L 69–74 | 0–1 | Connolly Center (350); Seattle, WA |
| 11/12/2017*; 1:00 pm | | Hawaii | L 58–73 | 0–2 | Connolly Center (570); Seattle, WA |
| 11/17/2017*; 7:00 pm | | at UC Santa Barbara | W 77–71 | 1–2 | The Thunderdome (702); Santa Barbara, CA |
| 11/19/2017*; 1:00 pm | | at Pepperdine | W 65–62 | 2–2 | Firestone Fieldhouse (267); Malibu, CA |
| 11/22/2017*; 6:00 pm | | Portland State | W 91–77 | 3–2 | Connolly Center (405); Seattle, WA |
| 11/26/2017*; 2:00 pm | | UC Davis | L 53–79 | 3–3 | Connolly Center (376); Seattle, WA |
| 11/30/2017*; 11:30 am | | at No. 24 California | L 67–87 | 3–4 | Haas Pavilion (4,362); Berkeley, CA |
| 12/02/2017*; 2:00 pm | | San Diego | W 80–73 | 4–4 | Connolly Center (422); Seattle, WA |
| 12/09/2017*; 4:00 pm | | Nevada | L 65–74 | 4–5 | Connolly Center (311); Seattle, WA |
| 12/13/2017*; 11:00 am | | at Montana | W 78–64 | 5–5 | Dahlberg Arena (7,018); Missoula, MT |
| 12/15/2017*; 5:00 pm | | at Idaho | W 68–60 | 6–5 | Cowan Spectrum (719); Moscow, ID |
| 12/17/2017*; 2:00 pm | | Pacific | L 73–85 | 6–6 | Connolly Center (321); Seattle, WA |
| 12/20/2017*; 7:00 pm | | at Washington | L 76–84 ^{OT} | 6–7 | Alaska Airlines Arena (1,526); Seattle, WA |
| 12/22/2017*; 2:00 pm | | UC Irvine | L 79–84 | 6–8 | Connolly Center (303); Seattle, WA |
| 12/30/2017*; 4:00 pm | | at Cal State Northridge | L 62–67 | 6–9 | Matadome (422); Northridge, CA |
WAC regular season
| 01/06/2018; 2:00 pm | | at Grand Canyon | L 63–74 | 6–10 (0–1) | GCU Arena (398); Phoenix, AZ |
| 01/11/2018; 5:00 pm | | at Chicago State | W 63–56 | 7–10 (1–1) | Jones Convocation Center (163); Chicago, IL |
| 01/13/2018; 12:00 pm | | at UMKC | W 62–58 | 8–10 (2–1) | Swinney Recreation Center (545); Kansas City, MO |
| 01/18/2018; 6:00 pm | | New Mexico State | W 69–59 | 9–10 (3–1) | Connolly Center (353); Seattle, WA |
| 01/20/2018; 4:00 pm | | Texas–Rio Grande Valley | W 64–56 | 10–10 (4–1) | Connolly Center (860); Seattle, WA |
| 01/27/2018; 1:00 pm | | at Cal State Bakersfield | L 68–75 | 10–11 (4–2) | Icardo Center (704); Bakersfield, CA |
| 02/03/2018; 1:00 pm | | at Utah Valley | W 77–75 | 11–11 (5–2) | Lockhart Arena (349); Orem, UT |
| 02/08/2018; 6:00 pm | | at UMKC | W 66–62 | 12–11 (6–2) | Connolly Center (325); Seattle, WA |
| 02/10/2018; 4:00 pm | | Chicago State | W 75–60 | 13–11 (7–2) | Connolly Center (318); Seattle, WA |
| 02/15/2018; 5:00 pm | | at Texas–Rio Grande Valley | L 67–69 ^{OT} | 13–12 (7–3) | UTRGV Fieldhouse (470); Edinburg, TX |
| 02/18/2018; 12:00 pm | | at New Mexico State | L 53–64 | 13–13 (7–4) | Pan American Center (882); Las Cruces, NM |
| 02/22/2018; 6:00 pm | | Grand Canyon | L 57–64 | 13–14 (7–5) | Connolly Center (348); Seattle, WA |
| 02/24/2018; 4:00 pm | | Cal State Bakersfield | W 64–56 | 14–14 (8–5) | Connolly Center (380); Seattle, WA |
| 03/03/2018; 3:00 pm | | Utah Valley | W 83–53 | 15–14 (9–5) | Connolly Center (544); Seattle, WA |
WAC Women's Tournament
| 03/07/2018; 8:30 pm, ESPN3 | (4) | vs. (5) UMKC; Quarterfinals | W 75–64 | 16–14 | Orleans Arena (809); Paradise, NV |
| 03/09/2018; 2:30 pm, ESPN3 | (4) | vs. (1) New Mexico State; Semifinals | W 84–61 | 17–14 | Orleans Arena (1,366); Paradise, NV |
| 03/10/2018; 2:00 pm, ESPN3 | (4) | vs. (2) Cal State Bakersfield; Championship Game | W 57–54 | 18–14 | Orleans Arena (733); Paradise, NV |
NCAA Women's Tournament
| 03/16/2018*; 4:30 pm, ESPN2 | (15 S) | at (2 S) No. 6 Oregon; First Round | L 45–88 | 18–15 | Matthew Knight Arena (7,040); Eugene, OR |
*Non-conference game. ^{#}Rankings from AP Poll. (#) Tournament seedings in parentheses. S=Spokane Region. All times are in Pacific Time.

== See also ==
- 2017–18 Seattle Redhawks men's basketball team
