= Anthony Forrest (disambiguation) =

Anthony Forrest was a politician.

Anthony Forrest may also refer to:

- Anthony Alexander Forrest (1884–1901), Australian rules footballer
- Anthony Forrest, actor in The Mark of Archanon

== See also ==
- Anthony Forest (disambiguation)
