= Lane Lord =

American women's college basketball coach

Current position
- Title: Head coach
- Team: UTRGV
- Conference: Southland Conference
- Record: 106–136 (.438)

Biographical details
- Born: May 19, 1970 (age 56); Waco, Texas
- Education: Tabor College (KS); Friends University

Coaching career (HC unless noted)
- 1995–2004: Wichita Heights HS
- 2004–2007: Barton CC
- 2007–2018: Pittsburg State
- 2018–present: UTRGV

Head coaching record
- Overall: 142–63 (.693) (high school); 413–257 (.616) (college)

Accomplishments and honors

Championships
- MIAA regular season championship (2017); KJCCC West regular season co-championship 2 KSHSAA 6A State championships 4 City League championships

Awards
- 5 MIAA Coach of the Year (2009, 2012, 2015, 2016, 2017); 3 NCAA Regional Coach of the Year (2009, 2012, 2017)

Lane R. Lord (born May 19, 1971) is an American college women's basketball coach currently coaching at the University of Texas Rio Grande Valley (UTRGV). He was previously the head coach at Pittsburg State University, a position he held from 2007 to 2018. While Lord was at Pittsburg State, the program won a conference regular season championships and appeared in four NCAA tournaments. Prior to his most recent post, Lord was the head coach for at Barton Community College from 2004 to 2007, where he led the school to three consecutive winning seasons, and one Kansas Jayhawk Community College Conference West Division co-regular season championship. Lord also taught and coached at Wichita Heights High School from 1995 to 2004.

== Career ==
=== High school career ===
Lord, a Waco, Texas native, began his coaching career in 1995 at Wichita Heights High School, where he spent nine seasons as the head coach leading the women's basketball team to two state tournament championships, six sub-state tournaments, four City League conference championships, and three state tournament appearances.

=== Barton Community College ===
After nine seasons at the high school level, Lord was named the Barton Community College head women's basketball coach. During his three seasons at Barton, Lord led the Cougars three consecutive 20-plus win seasons, one Kansas Jayhawk Community College Conference West Division co-regular season championship, and two trips to the National Junior College Athletic Association Region VI tournament.

=== Pittsburg State University ===
In April 2007, Pittsburg State University announced that Lord would become the new head coach for the women's basketball team. During his time at Pittsburg State, an NCAA Division II school, the Gorillas have won one conference regular season championship, have made five NCAA Division II Tournament appearances, and Lord has earned the MIAA Coach of the Year award five times – 2009, 2012, 2014, 2016, and 2017.

=== University of Texas at Rio Grande Valley ===
On May 21, 2018, Lord was named the head coach for the UTRGV women's basketball program.

== Head coach record ==
Record table
Season	Team	Overall	Conference	Standing	Postseason
Wichita Heights HS Falcons (City League) (1995–2004)
1995–96	Wichita Heights HS	10–11			
1996–97	Wichita Heights HS	9–11			
1997–98	Wichita Heights HS	10–12			KSHSAA 6A Sub-State runner-up
1998–99	Wichita Heights HS	9–12			
1999–2000	Wichita Heights HS	14–8			KSHSAA 6A Sub-State runner-up
2000–01	Wichita Heights HS	24–1			KSHSAA 6A State Tournament 3rd Place
2001–02	Wichita Heights HS	24–1			KSHSAA 6A State Tournament champions
2002–03	Wichita Heights HS	21–4			KSHSAA 6A State Tournament champions
2003–04	Wichita Heights HS	20–2			KSHSAA 6A Sub-State runner-up
Wichita Heights HS:		141–62 (.695)			
Barton Cougars (Kansas Jayhawk Community College Conference) (2004–2007)
2001–02	Barton County	22–12		4th	Region VI runner-up
2002–03	Barton County	28–5		2nd	Region VI runner-up
2003–04	Barton County	27–3		T–1st	Ineligible due to NJCAA infractions
Hastings:		77–20 (.794)			
Pittsburg State Gorillas (Mid-America Intercollegiate Athletics Association) (2007–2018)
2007–08	Pittsburg State	10–17	4–14	10th	
2008–09	Pittsburg State	20–9	14–6	3rd	
2009–10	Pittsburg State	14–14	12–8	4th	
2010–11	Pittsburg State	16–12	13–9	5th	
2011–12	Pittsburg State	27–6	17–3	2nd	NCAA Division II Elite Eight
2012–13	Pittsburg State	17–10	11–7	5th	
2013–14	Pittsburg State	23–8	16–3	T–2nd	NCAA Central Regional Tournament
2014–15	Pittsburg State	27–7	15–4	T–2nd	NCAA Central Regional Tournament
2015–16	Pittsburg State	29–6	18–4	T–2nd	NCAA Division II Elite Eight
2016–17	Pittsburg State	25–6	16–3	1st	NCAA Central Regional Tournament
2017–18	Pittsburg State	23–7	15–4	2nd	
Pittsburg State:		231–102 (.694)	151–65 (.699)		
UTRGV Vaqueros (Western Athletic Conference) (2018–2024)
2018–19	UTRGV	18–15	10–6	3rd	WBI First Round
2019–20	UTRGV	13–17	8–8	4th	
2020–21	UTRGV	6–14	2–8	7th	
2021–22	UTRGV	14–19	8–10	T-7th	
2022–23	UTRGV	12–18	6–12	11th	
2023–24	UTRGV	6–23	5–15	T-10th	
UTRGV Vaqueros (Southland Conference) (2024–present)
2024–25	UTRGV	16–16	11–9		
2025–26	UTRGV	21–14	16–6		WNIT Second Round
UTRGV:		106–136 (.438)	66–74 (.471)		
Total:		555–320 (.634)			
National champion Postseason invitational champion Conference regular season champion Conference regular season and conference tournament champion Division regular season champion Division regular season and conference tournament champion Conference tournament champion
