= 2018 WAC women's basketball tournament =

2018 Western Athletic Conference women's basketball tournament
- Classification: Division I
- Season: 2017–18
- Teams: 8
- Site: Orleans Arena; Paradise, Nevada
- Champions: Seattle (1st title)
- Winning coach: Suzy Barcomb (1st title)
- MVP: Kamira Sanders (Seattle)
- Attendance: 3,630
- Television: ESPN3

2017–18 WAC women's basketball standings
	Conf.				Overall
Team	W		L	PCT	W		L	PCT
New Mexico State	11	–	3	.786	18	–	12	.600
Cal State Bakersfield	10	–	4	.714	18	–	13	.581
Seattle U †	9	–	5	.643	18	–	14	.563
Grand Canyon	9	–	5	.643	16	–	14	.533
UMKC	7	–	7	.500	11	–	19	.367
Utah Valley	5	–	9	.357	11	–	19	.367
UT Rio Grande Valley	4	–	10	.286	14	–	16	.467
Chicago State	1	–	13	.071	1	–	29	.033
† 2018 WAC tournament winner As of March 16, 2018; Rankings from AP poll

The 2018 WAC women's basketball tournament was a tournament held March 7–10, 2018, at the Orleans Arena in Paradise, Nevada. Seattle, the winner of the WAC Tournament, earned an automatic trip to the 2018 NCAA tournament.

== Seeds ==
2018 WAC Women's Basketball Tournament seeds
Seed	School	Conference	Overall	Tiebreaker
1.	New Mexico State	11–3		
2.	Cal State Bakersfield	10–4		
3.	Grand Canyon	9–5		2–0 vs. Seattle
4.	Seattle	9–5		0–2 vs. Grand Canyon
5.	Missouri–Kansas City	7–7		
6.	Utah Valley	5–9		
7.	Texas–Rio Grande Valley	4–10		
8.	Chicago State	1–13		

== Schedule ==
Session	Game	Time*	Matchup^{#}	Television	Attendance
Quarterfinals – Wednesday, March 7
1	1	12:00 PM	#3 Grand Canyon vs. #6 Utah Valley	ESPN3	722
1	2	2:30 PM	#2 Cal State Bakersfield vs. #7 UTRGV	ESPN3	722
2	3	6:00 PM	#1 New Mexico State vs. #8 Chicago State	ESPN3	809
2	4	8:30 PM	#4 Seattle U vs. #5 UMKC	ESPN3	809
Semifinals – Friday, March 9
3	5	12:00 PM	#3 Grand Canyon vs. #2 Cal State Bakersfield	ESPN3	1,366
3	6	2:30 PM	#1 New Mexico State vs. #4 Seattle U	ESPN3	1,366
Championship Game – Saturday, March 10
4	7	2:00 PM	#2 Cal State Bakersfield vs. #4 Seattle U	ESPN3	733
*Game Times in PT. #-Rankings denote tournament seeding.

== Bracket ==
Quarterfinals; Wednesday, March 7
1	New Mexico State	84
8	Chicago State	60
4	Seattle	75
5	UMKC	64
3	Grand Canyon	72
6	Utah Valley	56
2	Cal State Bakersfield	70
7	UT Rio Grande Valley	59

Semifinals; Friday, March 9
1	New Mexico State	61
4	Seattle	84
3	Grand Canyon	55
2	Cal State Bakersfield	61

Finals; Saturday, March 10
4	Seattle	57
2	Cal State Bakersfield	54

== See also ==
- 2018 WAC men's basketball tournament
