= Joe Mikulik =

Baseball player (born 1963)

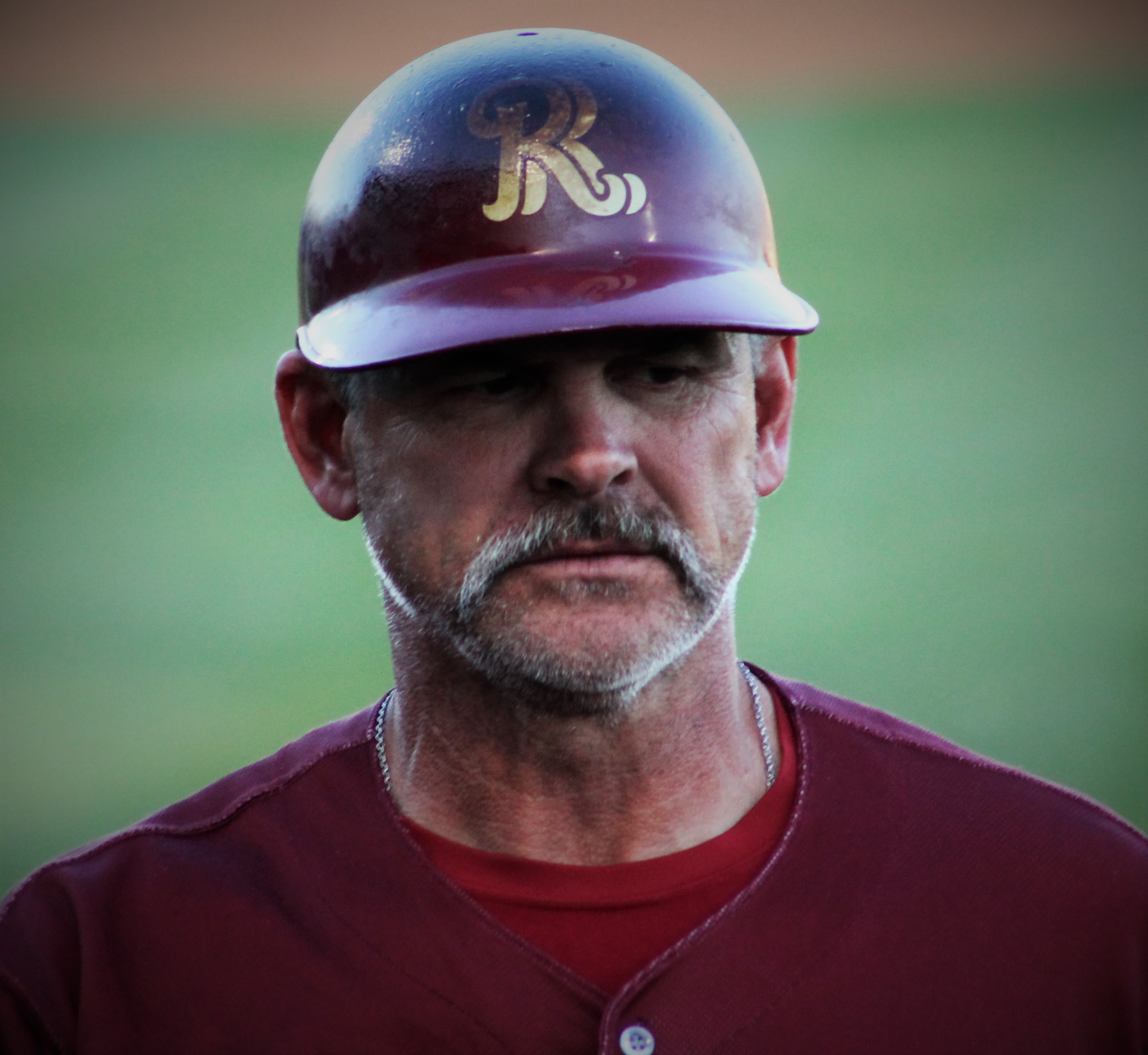
- Mikulik during a game in San Antonio in May 2016

Texas Tailgaters
- Coach / Outfielder
- Born: October 30, 1963 (age 62); Weimar, Texas, U.S.
- Bats: Right Throws: Right

Joseph Mikulik (/ˈmɪkəlɪk/ MIK-ə-lik), born October 30, 1963, in Weimar, Texas, is the manager of the Texas Tailgaters. He is a former minor league baseball player, coach, and manager. As an outfielder, he never rose above Triple-A but was a key player in the Tucson Toros' first Pacific Coast League championship in 1991. During 2007, his eighth season with the Asheville Tourists, Mikulik, who already held the team record for most games managed, became the team's all-time leader in managerial wins.

== Playing career ==
Mikulik attended Bishop Forest High School in Schulenburg, Texas, with his brothers John and Gene Mikulik, where he lettered in football, baseball, basketball and track and field. He then played two years at San Jacinto College, where he was a walk-on and received a full scholarship. After an All-American sophomore season, Texas A&M offered him a two-year scholarship, which he declined when he was selected by the Houston Astros in the ninth round of the 1984 draft.

Over the next ten years Mikulik played for the Auburn Astros, Asheville Tourists, Columbus Astros, and Jackson Generals, all in the Astros' minor league system, supplemented with a stint in the Mexican League. From 1988 to 1992 he spent parts of each season with the Triple-A Tucson Toros, finally spending the entire season there in 1993. Mikulik finished his career with a lifetime batting average of .279, 1,265 hits, 109 home runs, 670 RBIs, and 161 stolen bases. He hit his 1,000th minor league hit in 1992.

In 1995, he was a replacement player during the ongoing strike for Cleveland during spring training.

== Coaching career ==
In 1995, Mikulik coached the Canton–Akron Indians. He managed the Burlington Indians in 1997. He became manager of his previous team, the Asheville Tourists, in 2000. Mikulik won his 800th game with the Asheville Tourists on May 17, 2011, against Lexington and became the all-time leader in victories and games managed. In 2012, Mikulik lead the Tourists to the South Atlantic League Championship but after a tirade and subsequent ejection in Charleston, South Carolina, Mikulik was fired by the Tourists' major league affiliate, the Colorado Rockies.

Mikulik became the outfield coordinator in the Texas Rangers’ organization for the 2013 season and then became a manager in the Texas system, first with the Single-A Myrtle Beach Pelicans in 2014 and then with the Double-A Frisco Roughriders from 2014 through 2019.

Mikulik was hired as hitting coach by the Grand Junction Rockies in 2021, of the MLB partner league Pioneer League. He spent 2022 as manager of the Rocky Mountain Vibes, also of the Pioneer League.

In 2023, Mikulik joined the Spokane Indians as bench coach. In 2025, he resigned to become the coach of the Texas Tailgaters, a Banana Ball team, citing increased pay and the team playing closer to his Texas home.

== Meltdowns ==
Mikulik is infamous for several lengthy in-game tirades. In a game against the Lexington Legends on June 25, 2006, Mikulik instigated an argument with an umpire who had called Legends third baseman Koby Clemens safe on a close call at second base. The umpire ejected Mikulik, who responded by going on an extended rampage. He dislodged second base and threw it into the outfield, threw bats from the dugout onto the field, then poured water on home plate before leaving for the clubhouse, where he toppled water coolers and a chair in front of the umpires' locker room. Afterward, Mikulik was unapologetic, claiming he "could get two mannequins at Sears" to "umpire better than what I saw this whole series." He received a seven-day suspension and $1,000 fine. His antics were shown on The Tonight Show with Jay Leno, Pardon the Interruption, SportsCenter, and Countdown with Keith Olbermann. Mikulik's behavior was mentioned in Legendary: When Baseball Came to the Bluegrass, a 2011 documentary about the Legends.

On July 27, 2012, in the bottom of the first inning of a game against the Charleston RiverDogs, Mikulik came out of the dugout to dispute a call that a baserunner had eluded a tag. Mikulik was ejected by an umpire after he argued, kicked dirt, and reenacted the play. Mikulik went back to argue with the umpires, removing third base and handing it to a fan. Mikulik left the game tipping his hat to the crowd as he received mixed applause.

Managing Myrtle Beach on August 17, 2014, Mikulik had a widely-reported meltdown where he responded to getting ejected by removing some of his clothing on the field.

== Personal life ==
Mikulik has two children, Dawson and Susan. Susan married Ian Stewart, who was coached by Mikulik in Asheville. Mikulik met his first wife, Kathy, while playing for Asheville in 1985. Mikulik married Candy Conway on October 13, 2014.
