= 2017–18 Chicago State Cougars women's basketball team =

Intercollegiate basketball season

2017–18 Chicago State Cougars women's basketball
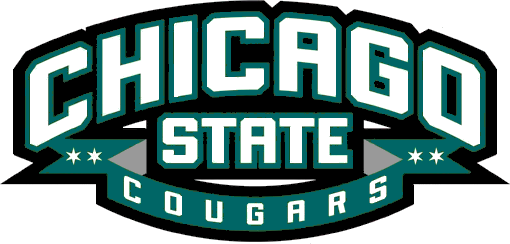
- Conference: Western Athletic Conference
- Record: 1–29 (1–13 WAC)
- Head coach: Angela Jackson (15th season)
- Assistant coaches: Renada Blackburn; Tonishea Mack
- Home arena: Jones Convocation Center (Capacity: 7,000)

2017–18 WAC women's basketball standings
	Conf.				Overall
Team	W		L	PCT	W		L	PCT
New Mexico State	11	–	3	.786	18	–	12	.600
Cal State Bakersfield	10	–	4	.714	18	–	13	.581
Seattle U †	9	–	5	.643	18	–	14	.563
Grand Canyon	9	–	5	.643	16	–	14	.533
UMKC	7	–	7	.500	11	–	19	.367
Utah Valley	5	–	9	.357	11	–	19	.367
UT Rio Grande Valley	4	–	10	.286	14	–	16	.467
Chicago State	1	–	13	.071	1	–	29	.033
† 2018 WAC tournament winner As of March 16, 2018; Rankings from AP poll

The 2017–18 Chicago State Cougars women's basketball team represented Chicago State University in the 2017-18 NCAA Division I women's basketball season. They were led by fifteenth-year head coach Angela Jackson. The Cougars played their home games at the Emil and Patricia Jones Convocation Center, located in Chicago. They finished the season 1–29, 1–13 in WAC play to finish in last place. They lost in the quarterfinals of the WAC women's tournament to New Mexico State.

Following the end of the season, head coach Jackson was fired by the Chicago State Board of Trustees, along with men's head coach Tracy Dildy. A replacement has not yet been named.

== Roster ==
2017–18 Chicago State Cougars women's basketball team
Players
Coaches

Pos.	#	Name	Height	Year	Previous school	Hometown
G	1	Phylicia Jackson	5 ft 8 in (1.73 m)	RS Sr	Pickerington Central HS; Eastern Illinois	Columbus, OH
F	4	Alexandria Cliff	6 ft 0 in (1.83 m)	So	Roncalli HS	Manitowoc, WI
G	10	Tyeshia Bowers	5 ft 7 in (1.7 m)	Fr	Flint Southwestern Acad.	Flint, MI
G	11	Konner Harris	5 ft 9 in (1.75 m)	RS Sr	Sidney HS	Sidney, OH
G	12	Tiana Thomas	5 ft 7 in (1.7 m)	Jr	Hononegah HS	Rockton, IL
F	22	Ines Mata Boix	6 ft 2 in (1.88 m)	RS So	Marquette	Madrid, Spain
G	25	Destiny Harris	5 ft 7 in (1.7 m)	Sr	Homewood-Flossmoor HS; Iowa Western CC	Crete, IL
F	34	Tamara Olverson	6 ft 0 in (1.83 m)	Fr	Winton Woods HS	Cincinnati, OH
G	35	Alexa Blake	5 ft 8 in (1.73 m)	Fr	Pickerington Central HS	Columbus, OH

Head coach

- Angela Jackson (Old Dominion)

Assistant coach(es)

- Renada Blackburn (Chicago State)
- Tonishea Mack (Grambling State)

Legend

- (C) Team captain
- (S) Suspended
- (I) Ineligible
- (W) Walk-on
- Injured
- Current redshirt

Roster
Last update: March 31, 2018

== Schedule ==
Date time, TV	Rank^{#}	Opponent^{#}	Result	Record	Site (attendance) city, state
Non-conference regular season
11/10/2017*; 7:00 pm		Northwestern	L 36–63	0–1	Jones Convocation Center (250); Chicago, IL
11/15/2017*; 7:00 pm		at Illinois	L 56–66	0–2	State Farm Center (1,056); Champaign, IL
11/18/2017*; 2:00 pm		Jackson State	L 69–87	0–3	Jones Convocation Center (350); Chicago, IL
11/20/2017*; 7:00 pm		Northern Illinois	L 59–80	0–4	Jones Convocation Center (347); Chicago, IL
11/22/2017*; 7:00 pm		Western Illinois	L 45–83	0–5	Jones Convocation Center (163); Chicago, IL
11/26/2017*; 2:00 pm		Morehead State	L 40–79	0–6	Jones Convocation Center (103); Chicago, IL
11/29/2017*; 7:00 pm, ESPN3		at Western Illinois	L 54–71	0–7	Western Hall (501); Macomb, IL
12/01/2017*; 7:00 pm		Loyola–Chicago	L 28–46	0–8	Jones Convocation Center (112); Chicago, IL
12/03/2017*; 1:00 pm		at Wright State	L 39–84	0–9	Nutter Center (507); Fairborn, OH
12/10/2017*; 3:00 pm, ESPN3		at Valparaiso	L 60–71	0–10	Athletics–Recreation Center (289); Valparaiso, IN
12/15/2017*; 7:00 pm		at Wichita State; Shocker Winter Classic	L 63–66	0–11	Charles Koch Arena (1,248); Wichita, KS
12/16/2017*; 8:30 pm		vs. Oral Roberts; Shocker Winter Classic	L 43–73	0–12	Charles Koch Arena (1,203); Wichita, KS
12/18/2017*; 7:00 pm, ESPN3		at Kansas State	L 51–99	0–13	Bramlage Coliseum (2,927); Manhattan, KS
12/21/2017*; 7:00 pm		Milwaukee	L 59–84	0–14	Jones Convocation Center (124); Chicago, IL
12/31/2017*; 1:00 pm, ACCN Extra		at Pittsburgh	L 49–87	0–15	Peterson Events Center (567); Pittsburgh, PA
WAC regular season
01/06/2018; 3:00 pm		at New Mexico State	L 59–74	0–16 (0–1)	Pan American Center (777); Las Cruces, NM
01/11/2018; 7:00 pm		Seattle	L 56–63	0–17 (0–2)	Jones Convocation Center (163); Chicago, IL
01/13/2018; 2:00 pm		Utah Valley	L 30–68	0–18 (0–3)	Jones Convocation Center (122); Chicago, IL
01/18/2018; 8:00 pm		at Grand Canyon	L 36–64	0–19 (0–4)	GCU Arena (411); Phoenix, AZ
01/20/2018; 3:00 pm		at Cal State Bakersfield	L 49–63	0–20 (0–5)	Icardo Center (434); Bakersfield, CA
01/27/2018; 7:00 pm		at Texas–Rio Grande Valley	L 44–81	0–21 (0–6)	UTRGV Fieldhouse (750); Edinburg, TX
02/01/2018; 7:00 pm		Cal State Bakersfield	L 36–63	0–22 (0–7)	Jones Convocation Center (163); Chicago, IL
02/03/2018; 2:00 pm		Grand Canyon	L 43–59	0–23 (0–8)	Jones Convocation Center (55); Chicago, IL
02/08/2018; 12:00 pm		at Utah Valley	W 84–74	1–23 (1–8)	Lockhart Arena (1,984); Orem, UT
02/10/2018; 6:00 pm		at Seattle	L 60–75	1–24 (1–9)	Connolly Center (318); Seattle, WA
02/17/2018; 1:00 pm		at UMKC	L 47–106	1–25 (1–10)	Swinney Recreation Center (440); Kansas City, MO
02/22/2018; 7:00 pm		New Mexico State	L 55–63	1–26 (1–11)	Jones Convocation Center (163); Chicago, IL
02/24/2018; 7:00 pm		Texas–Rio Grande Valley	L 62–69	1–27 (1–12)	Jones Convocation Center (163); Chicago, IL
03/03/2018; 1:00 pm		UMKC	L 47–59	1–28 (1–13)	Jones Convocation Center (150); Chicago, IL
WAC Women's Tournament
03/07/2018; 8:00 pm, ESPN3	(8)	vs. (1) New Mexico State; Quarterfinals	L 60–84	1–29	Orleans Arena (809); Paradise, NV
*Non-conference game. ^{#}Rankings from AP Poll. (#) Tournament seedings in parentheses. All times are in Central.

- Schedule source:

== See also ==
- 2017–18 Chicago State Cougars men's basketball team
