= Hugo Hollas =

American football player (1945–1995)

No. 18, 47
- Position: Safety

Personal information
- Born: November 30, 1945; Schulenburg, Texas, U.S.
- Died: September 6, 1995 (aged 49); Schulenburg, Texas, U.S.
- Listed height: 6 ft 1 in (1.85 m)
- Listed weight: 190 lb (86 kg)

Career information
- High school: Bishop Forest (Schulenburg)
- College: Rice
- NFL draft: 1968: undrafted

Career history
- Dallas Cowboys (1968)*; Richmond Roadrunners (1969); New Orleans Saints (1970–1973); San Francisco 49ers (1974); San Antonio Wings (1975)
- * Offseason or practice squad member only

Awards and highlights
- First-team All-SWC (1967)

Career NFL statistics
- Interceptions: 11
- Fumble recoveries: 4
- Sacks: 2
- Stats at Pro Football Reference

Hugo Andrew Hollas (November 30, 1945 – September 6, 1995) was an American professional football safety in the National Football League (NFL) for the New Orleans Saints and San Francisco 49ers. He also was a member of the San Antonio Wings in the World Football League (WFL). He played college football for the Rice Owls.

== Early life ==
Hollas attended Bishop Forest High School. He accepted a football scholarship from Rice University, where he was a three-year starter at defensive back.

As a senior, he received All-SWC honors, after leading the team with 5 interceptions.

== Professional career ==
=== Dallas Cowboys ===
Hollas was signed as an undrafted free agent by the Dallas Cowboys after the 1968 NFL/AFL draft. He was limited with a thumb injury he suffered in training camp. He was waived injured before the start of the season on July 31.

=== Richmond Roadrunners ===
In 1969, he signed with the Richmond Roadrunners of the Atlantic Coast Football League. He led the league in interceptions.

=== New Orleans Saints ===
In 1970, he was signed by the New Orleans Saints as a free agent, reuniting with head coach J. D. Roberts, who was also his coach with the Richmond Roadrunners. He earned the starter job at free safety and also played some snaps at cornerback, while leading the team with 5 interceptions.

In 1971, when future Pro Football Hall of Famer Archie Manning joined the Saints, he discovered that the No. 18 jersey he wore at the University of Mississippi was taken by Hollas, so he was forced to choose No. 8 instead. He tied for the team lead with 5 interceptions that season.

In 1972, he was limited with injuries, but still managed to play in all 14 games, while moving to strong safety in the latter part of the season.

In 1973, he suffered a torn knee ligaments injury, while playing a preseason game against the Dallas Cowboys. On August 21, he was placed on the injured reserve list. He was released on September 10, 1974.

Hollas registered five interceptions in each of his first two seasons and ended up appearing in 39 games with 31 starts. He finished with 11 career interceptions and 4 fumble recoveries.

=== San Francisco 49ers ===
In October 1974, Hollas called the San Francisco 49ers, after seeing on television, safety Mel Phillips suffering a broken arm injury against the Oakland Raiders, and arranged a tryout through Don Heinrich, who was an assistant coach with the Saints during Hollas' rookie year. On November 1, he signed with the 49ers as a free agent. He appeared in 7 games as a backup safety and special teams player. He wasn't re-signed after the season.

=== San Antonio Wings ===
In June 1975, he signed with the San Antonio Wings of the World Football League. He played 18 games at free safety.

== Personal life ==
Hollas died in Schulenburg, Texas on September 6, 1995, at the age of 49 from a heart attack.
