= Schulenburg Sticker =

Weekly newspaper in Texas, USA

The Schulenburg Sticker
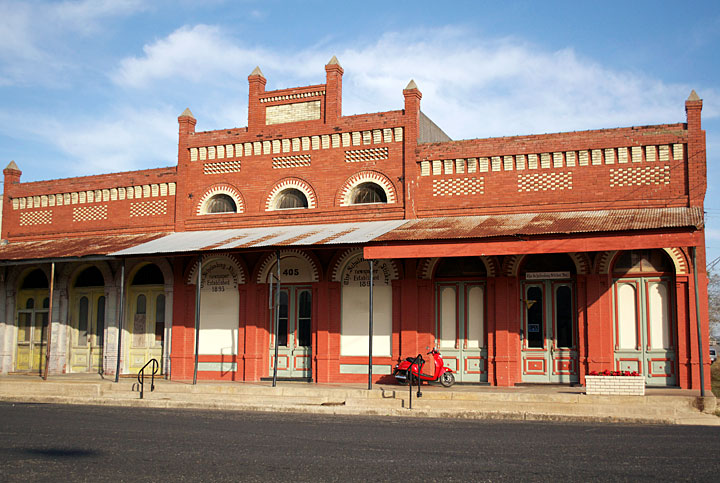
- The S. T. Schaefer Building in Schulenburg, Texas
- Type: Weekly newspaper
- Format: Broadsheet
- Owner(s): Joe and Maxine Vyvjala
- Publisher: Maxine Vyvjala
- Editor: Darrell Vyvjala and Diane Prause
- Founded: 1894
- Language: English
- Headquarters: Schulenburg, Texas
- Circulation: 1,795 (as of 2023)
- ISSN: 0895-4275
- Website: Official website

The Schulenburg Sticker is a weekly newspaper in Schulenburg, Texas.

It is published every Thursday except during the week of Christmas. It has been in continuous publication since 1894. The Schulenburg Sticker is currently owned by the Vyvjala family of Schulenburg.

== History ==
=== Earlier newspapers ===
Some of the Sticker's predecessors were the Commercial, the Messenger, the Schulenburg Enterprise, Schulenburg Siftings, the Schulenburg Globe, and the Schulenburg Argus. The Schulenburg Argus was published from 1877 to 1878 by Pocohontas Edmondson, founder of the Flatonia Argus.

=== First publication ===
Ernst Goeth, a German immigrant, began publishing the Sticker in 1894. Goeth claimed that despite earlier newspaper failures in Schulenburg, his paper would "stick" around. Although the earliest issues are now lost, calculations show the first issue of the Sticker was published August 16, 1894.

== Ownership ==
Around 1900, Goeth sold the paper to W. S. Moore, who owned it about a year, then sold it to William Reynolds King. At that time, the circulation totaled about 1,000. From 1903 to 1914, the Sticker was published by Raymond R. Winfree. During his tenure, the paper shared an upstairs office at 625 1/2 North Main with Engelbert F. Theuer's German newspaper Texas Volksfreund (published 1904–16). During the ownership of D. O. Bell & Son (1914–20), the Sticker changed from a gasoline engine to electricity to run its presses. Another short-term owner was Jack A. Price (1920–21). However, for the next 50-plus years, various members of the Bosl family maintained continuous ownership. Ernest A. Bosl was the first to have ownership of the newspaper, from 1921 to 1935.

In 1923, records showed the Sticker was at the corner of Lyons and Anderson, but in February 1934, the Sticker moved to its present location at 405 North Main in the S. T. Schaefer building. More room was needed for new equipment, including a 10,000-pound press. The Schaefer building, containing three offices on the ground floor, was completed in 1896. It originally housed Schaefer's office; his store, which sold paint, building materials, and undertakers' supplies; and the Palace Saloon. The Sticker was handset until September 1934, when a Model 8 Linotype was installed. A newspaper page set by Linotype weighed about 50 pounds.

On January 1, 1935, E.A. Bosl sold the Sticker to his brother, Charles F. Bosl, and John Guilford McMillan, who started as Sticker foreman in 1921. On August 4, 1937, Charles Bosl married Florence Barry, who became associated with the paper. In 1946, Charles and Florence Bosl bought McMillan's interest. Then in 1959, McMillan transferred ownership of his print shop to the Sticker and the two were combined. Throughout most of its history, the Sticker has maintained a print shop - it is still an integral part of the business today.

After Charles' death on October 31, 1954, Florence remained active in the Sticker. She became an international correspondent, winning many awards for her writing. Starting in 1967, she leased the paper, while continuing as owner/executive editor, to Mr. and Mrs. Joe Vyvjala, 1967–68; Mr. and Mrs. G. Frank Bridges, 1968–71; and Lester Zapalac, 1971–77.

In late 1971, the Sticker used its first computer (the old-style Compugraphic), although the Linotype was not yet completely retired. After Florence Bosl died on March 26, 1972, the Sticker was sold to Tex-Print Corporation, a subsidiary of Todd Publications, Inc., of Austin, owned by William K. and Dorothy Todd and family. Zapalac's lease contract, however, did not expire until 1977.

On November 1, 1975, Joe Vyvjala and brother-in-law Max J. Nikel Sr. bought the Sticker. On March 1, 1984, Vyvjala, who had been employed at the Sticker since 1956, became sole proprietor. In April 1987, the Sticker purchased the adjacent office space at 401 North Main (originally the Palace Saloon), and moved its offices there in 1993. That same year, Joe retired, though he remained publisher emeritus. His wife, Maxine, now runs the business, with their children Darrell Vyvjala and Diane Prause as editors. Coincidentally, in 1994, Maxine and son-in-law Paul Prause bought the Flatonia Argus newspaper, where Joe got his start in 1942.

Since 1986, the Vyvjala family has been attending the annual South Texas Press Association conventions. From 1994 to 1999, Maxine served as STPA director. The Sticker's circulation now totals about 3,000.

== Awards ==
The front office of the Sticker is lined with more than 50 awards, which the Sticker has won over the past 12 years in regional newspaper contests - on entries ranging from sports to news to features to family/social pages. Among the awards are 11 first-place plaques and a runner-up award for "best all around" in the South Texas Press Association contest in 1993.

== See also ==
- List of newspapers in Texas
