= Bellevue High School =

Bellevue High School may refer to:

- Bellevue High School (Bellevue, Iowa)
- Bellevue High School (Bellevue, Kentucky)
- Bellevue High School (Bellevue, Michigan)
- Bellevue High School (Bellevue, Ohio)
- Bellevue High School (Texas)
- Bellevue High School (Bellevue, Washington)
- Bellevue East High School (Bellevue, Nebraska)
- Bellevue West High School (Bellevue, Nebraska)
- Bellevue High School (Nashville, Tennessee 1931-1980)
