= Schulenburg Independent School District =

School district in Texas, United States

Coordinates: 29°41′13.0″N 96°54′18.2″W

Address
- 521 Shorthorn Drive Schulenburg, Texas; United States

District information
- Type: Public / Rural
- Grades: Pre-K–12
- Established: 1936
- Superintendent: Julie Motomura
- Schools: 2
- Budget: $5,956,001
- NCES District ID: 4839540

Students and staff
- Students: 663 (2023–2024)
- Teachers: 58.79 (on an FTE basis)
- Student–teacher ratio: 11.28:1
- District mascot: Shorthorns
- Colors: Orange, Black

Other information
- Website: www.schulenburgisd.net

Schulenburg Independent School District is a public school district based in Schulenburg, Texas (USA).

Schulenburg High School is a 2A school with approximately 250 students located midway between San Antonio and Houston on Interstate 10.

Schulenburg won the U.I.L. Class 2A state football title in 1991 and 1992 under Coach David Husmann.

In 2011, the school district was rated "academically acceptable" by the Texas Education Agency.

Head Football Coach: Luke Hobbs Head Volleyball Coach: Donald Zapalac Head Boys Basketball: Richard Hoogendoorn Head Girls Basketball: Larry Tidwell Head Baseball: Isaiah Barrera Head Softball: Gilbert Price Head Boys Track: Brandon Williams Head Girls Track: Donald Zapalac Head Powerlifting: Jaylen Samuels

== Schools ==
- Schulenburg Secondary School (Grades 6-12)
  - 2011 Rated "academically acceptable" by the Texas Education Agency.
- Schulenburg Elementary School (Grades PK-5)
  - 2008 National Blue Ribbon School
  - 2011 Rated "academically unacceptable" by the Texas Education Agency.
