= UT Rio Grande Valley Vaqueros women's basketball =

2025–26 UT Rio Grande Valley Vaqueros women's basketball team
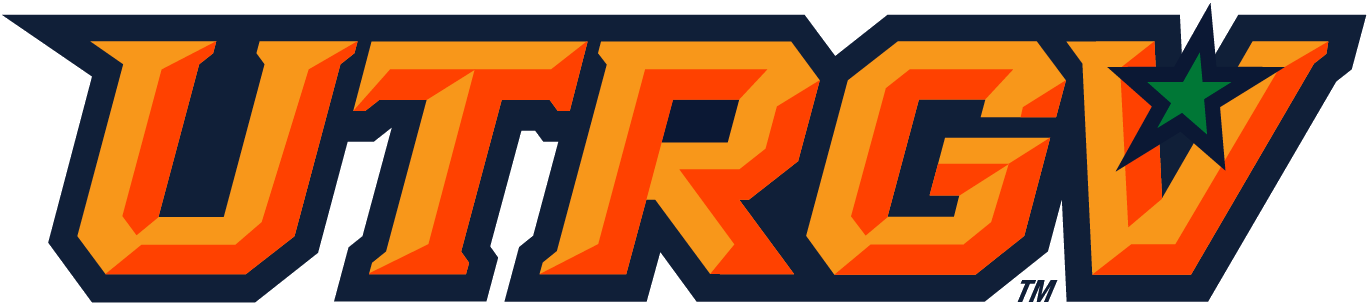
- University: University of Texas Rio Grande Valley
- Head coach: Lane Lord (8th season)
- Location: Edinburg, Texas
- Arena: UTRGV Fieldhouse (capacity: 2,500)
- Conference: Southland Conference
- Nickname: Vaqueros
- Colors: Orange and gray

Uniforms
Home	Away

The UT Rio Grande Valley Vaqueros women's basketball team is the intercollegiate women's basketball program representing the University of Texas Rio Grande Valley (UTRGV). The school competes in the Southland Conference (SLC), part of Division I of the National Collegiate Athletic Association (NCAA), since the 2024–25 season. The Vaqueros play home basketball games at the UTRGV Fieldhouse on the university campus in Edinburg, Texas.

The team was established in its current identity after the University of Texas at Brownsville and the University of Texas–Pan American (UTPA) were merged in 2015. The UTPA athletic program, nicknamed "Broncs", was directly converted to that of UTRGV, with UTPA's WAC membership and athletic history transferring to the new institution. The Vaqueros are one of 69 NCAA Division I programs to have never qualified for the NCAA Division I women's basketball tournament.

== History ==
=== John McDowell era (1982–1986) ===
The Broncs began play in women's basketball in 1982 when the school was known as Pan American University. The Broncs played their first three season as a NAIA Independent, with the first ever coach in school history being John McDowell. In their three seasons as a NAIA Independent, they finished 10–5, 7–11, and 12–12, respectively. In his fourth and final season, he coached them to a 7–19 record in their first ever season of Division I play (as an independent).

=== McDaniel and De Los Santos years (1986–1988) ===
Tony McDaniel coached the team for one season (1986–87), leading them to a 7–17 record. Becky De Los Santos took over for the 1987–88 season, the first season for the Broncs in the American South Conference. However, the team lost all 27 games, and De Los Santos did not return.

=== Tim Hicks era (1988–1992) ===
Tim Hicks also did not win any games as coach of the 1988–89 season, but the next season saw an improvement from 0 wins to 3. After that season, the school's name changed to the University of Texas–Pan American when it joined the University of Texas System. The 1990–91 season was their last in the American South Conference, but it was the season in which they picked up their first ever conference wins (2 in total). In four seasons in the American South Conference, they went 2–40 in conference play. The conference merged with the Sun Belt Conference in 1991. In the final season for Hicks as coach, the Broncs went 10–18 and 2–14 in conference play.

=== Garner and Green years (1992–1996) ===
Traci Garner took over for the 1992–93 season. In her two season as coach she went 10–44 (6–21 and 4–23, respectively) overall and 3–24 (3–11 and 1–13 respectively) in conference play. Cletus Green also coached for two seasons (1994–95 and 1995–96), going 3–24 (2–12) and 10–17 (3–11), respectively.

=== Kathy Halligan era (1996–2000) ===
Kathy Halligan coached for four seasons from 1996–2000, overseeing their departure from the Sun Belt Conference after the 1997–98 season. In the final two seasons (1996–97 and 1997–98) playing under the Sun Belt label, they went 5–22 (3–11) and 1–26 (0–14), respectively, with the cumulative total of their seven seasons of conference play being a record of 14–86. Halligan's two seasons under the Independent label did not have much improvement, as she went 8–19 in 1998–99 and 6–21 in 1999–2000. On March 1, 2000, it was announced that Halligan would be reassigned within the Athletic Department, ending her tenure as coach.

=== Karin Nicholls years (2000–2002) ===
Two months later, Karin Nicholls was hired as coach. She coached for two seasons from 2000–2002. In her two seasons, her teams went 11–17 and 7–21 for a total record of 18–38. Tracy Anderson coached for only the 2002–03 season, going 7–21.

=== DeAnn Craft era (2003–2009) ===
DeAnn Craft took over as coach, starting with the 2003–04 season. The Broncs finished with a 13–15 record, but the team had the most victories in school history. They improved to a 14–14 record the following year, which was their first ever .500 season since the 1984–85 season. They sunk to a 7–21 record in 2005. The next two seasons finished the same, with 11–18 records. The 2008–09 season proved to be the final season for Craft and the last season as an Independent for the Broncs, and they finished 14–16, tying the school record for wins. Craft resigned with one year remaining on her contract. She cited the loss of a radio contract to broadcast both men's and women's basketball games, the decision to cease providing scholarship benefits to incoming players to the program in the summer before their first year and aid to ensure graduation for fifth-year students, both factors that she thought were de-emphasizing the program. Her 70 victories remained a school record until 2017, with her 192 games coached and 102 losses remaining school records as of 2018.

=== Denny Downing era (2009–2013) ===
Denny Downing took over as coach for the 2009–10 season, their first season as member of the Great West Conference. They finished 13–17, with an 8–4 conference record, their first ever season with an above .500 record in conference. The next season was a downgrade, as they finished 12–19 (4–8 in conference). They inched up with a 13–17 record (5–5 conference record) in 2011–12, but they stepped back the next season, finishing 12–16 (4–4 conference record). Downing's contract was not renewed after the season ended.

=== Larry Tidwell era and transition to UTRGV (2013–2018) ===
Larry Tidwell was hired to coach the team for the 2013–14 season, which was the first for the Broncs in Western Athletic Conference play. They finished 14–16, with an 8–8 conference record. The following year, the Broncs, in their final year before transitioning into being known as the UTRGV Vaqueros, finished the history of Pan American with a winning season. It was their first since finishing 10–5 in the NAIA Division II level back in their first ever season. They also broke the record for most program victories (which had been 14 in 2013) with 19 victories. Other school records were set, such as conference victories, conference tournament wins (two), victories at home (12), victories on the road (4), and victories on a neutral site (3). Ultimately, they finished 19–15. In the 2015 WAC women's basketball tournament, they beat UMKC and Cal State Bakersfield to reach the Championship. Even though they subsequently lost to New Mexico State 70–52, the Broncs secured a Women's Basketball Invitational (WBI) appearance, their first postseason appearance in program history. In the 2015 Women's Basketball Invitational, they lost to Louisiana–Lafayette Ragin' Cajuns 78–56 in the first round.

The 2015–16 season was the first ever season under the UT-RGV label, which was a combination of Pan American with University of Texas at Brownsville. The Vaqueros finished 18–13 overall, with a 9–5 conference record. In the 2016 WAC women's basketball tournament, they beat Chicago State and Cal State Bakersfield to reach the championship once again. However, they were beat by New Mexico State once again, 80–53. Despite the loss, the team qualified for the 2016 Women's National Invitation Tournament.

The 2016–17 team fell to UMKC in the WAC first round, but they were invited to the 2017 WBI. In the First Round, they beat Stephen F. Austin 62–54 for their first ever postseason victory.

=== Lane Lord (2018–present) ===
On May 21, 2018, Lane Lord was hired as the new head coach. In his first season, they went 18-14 and 10–6 in WAC play for a 3rd place finish. In the WAC Tournament, they advanced all the way to the Final for the third time in five years, although they once again lost to New Mexico State, doing so in double overtime 76–73.

== All-time season results ==
Results accurate as of the end of the 2017–18 season.

Season	Record	Conference record	Coach
1982–83	10–5	n/a	John McDowell
1983–84	7–11	n/a	John McDowell
1984–85	12–12	n/a	John McDowell
1985–86	7–19	n/a	John McDowell
1986–87	7–17	n/a	Tony McDaniel
1987–88	0–27	0–10	Becky De Los Santos
1988–89	0–27	0–10	Tim Hicks
1989–90	3–24	0–10	Tim Hicks
1990–91	7–20	2–10	Tim Hicks
1991–92	10–18	2–14	Tim Hicks
1992–93	6–21	3–11	Traci Garner
1993–94	4–23	1–13	Traci Garner
1994–95	3–24	2–12	Cletus Green
1995–96	10–17	3–11	Cletus Green
1996–97	5–22	3–11	Kathy Halligan
1997–98	1–26	0–14	Kathy Halligan
1998–99	8–19	n/a	Kathy Halligan
1999–00	6–21	n/a	Kathy Halligan
2000–01	11–17	n/a	Karin Nicholls
2001–02	7–21	n/a	Karin Nicholls
2002–03	7–21	n/a	Tracy Anderson
2003–04	13–15	n/a	DeAnn Craft
2004–05	14–14	n/a	DeAnn Craft
2005–06	7–21	n/a	DeAnn Craft
2006–07	11–18	n/a	DeAnn Craft
2007–08	11–18	n/a	DeAnn Craft
2008–09	14–16	n/a	DeAnn Craft
2009–10	13–17	8–4	Denny Downing
2010–11	12–19	4–8	Denny Downing
2011–12	13–17	5–5	Denny Downing
2012–13	12–16	4–4	Denny Downing
2013–14	14–16	8–8	Larry Tidwell
2014–15	19–15	9–5	Larry Tidwell
2015–16	19–14	9–5	Larry Tidwell
2016–17	19–15	8–6	Larry Tidwell
2017–18	14–16	4–10	Larry Tidwell
2018–19	18-14	10–6	Lane Lord

== Coaching history ==
As of the end of the 2023–24 season, the Vaqueros have had 13 head coaches.

Coach	Tenure	Overall record	Conference record
John McDowell	1982–1986	36–47	N/A
Tony McDaniel	1986–1987	7–17	N/A
Becky De Los Santos	1987–1988	0–27	0–10
Tim Hicks	1988–1992	20–89	4–44
Traci Garner	1992–1994	10–44	4–24
Cletus Green	1994–1996	13–41	5–23
Kathy Halligan	1996–2000	20–88	3–25
Karin Nicholls	2000–2002	13–38	N/A
Tracy Anderson	2002–2003	7–21	N/A
DeAnn Craft	2003–2009	70–102	N/A
Denny Downing	2009–2013	50–69	21–21
Larry Tidwell	2013–2018	85–75	38–34
Lane Lord	2018–present	63–83	34–44
Totals		394–741	109–225

== Conference history ==
Conference	Years
NAIA Independent	1982–1985
Division I Independent	1985–1987, 1998–2009
American South Conference	1987–1991
Sun Belt Conference	1991–1998
Great West Conference	2009–2013
Western Athletic Conference	2013–2024
Southland Conference	2024–future

== Postseason history ==
The Vaqueros have made four postseason appearances, with three of them being in the Women's Basketball Invitational and one being in the Women's National Invitation Tournament. They have never made the NCAA Tournament.

=== WNIT appearances ===
The Vaqueros have appeared in the Women's National Invitation Tournament twice. They have a record of 1–2.

Year	Round	Opponent	Result
2016	First Round	TCU	L 73–97
2026	First Round; Second Round	Austin Peay; Illinois State	W 71–59; L 52–81

=== WBI appearances ===
The Vaqueros have appeared in the Women's Basketball Invitational (WBI) thrice. They have a record of 1–3.

Year	Round	Opponent	Result
2015	First Round	Louisiana–Lafayette	L 56–78
2017	First Round; Second Round	Stephen F. Austin; Rice	W 62–54; L 63–73
2019	First Round	North Texas	L 42–56
