= Schulenburg, Texas =

City in Texas, US

- City
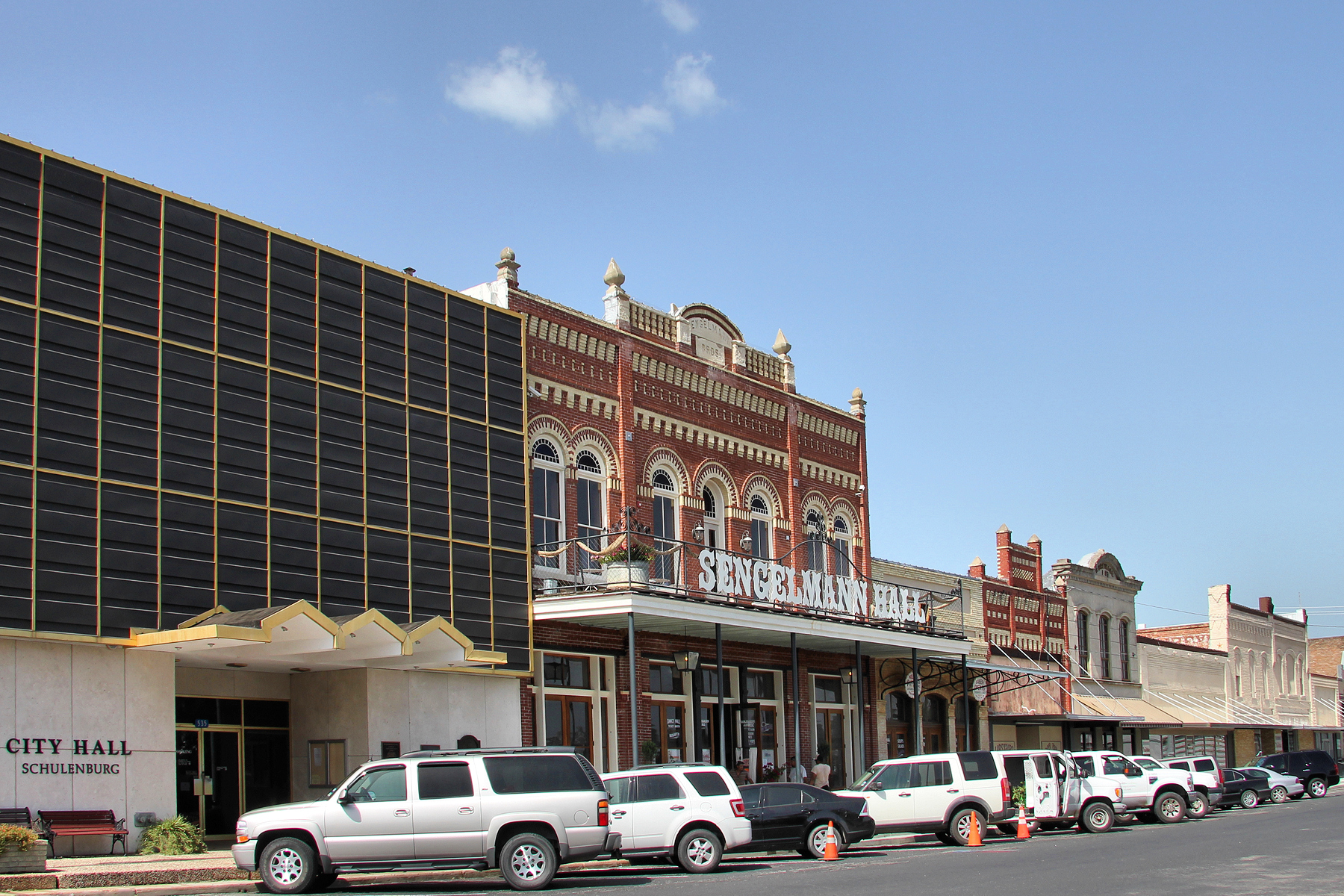
- Motto: "Halfway to Everywhere"
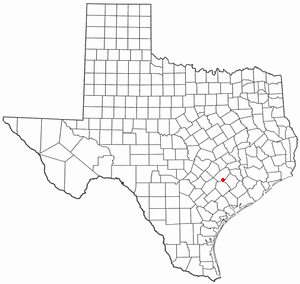
- Location of Schulenburg, Texas

- Coordinates: 29°40′55″N 96°54′27″W
- Country: United States
- State: Texas
- County: Fayette
- Incorporated: May 24, 1875

Government
  - Mayor: Connie Koopmann
  - City council: Aldermen: Chip Bubela; Wendy Fietsam; Arnold Stoever; Harvey Herzik; Larry Veselka
  - City manager: Tami Walker

Area
  - Total: 2.61 sq mi (6.77 km^{2})
  - Land: 2.61 sq mi (6.77 km^{2})
  - Water: 0 sq mi (0.00 km^{2})
- Elevation: 364 ft (111 m)

Population (2020)
  - Total: 2,633
  - Density: 1,114.4/sq mi (430.29/km^{2})
- Time zone: UTC-6 (Central (CST))
  - Summer (DST): UTC-5 (CDT)
- ZIP code: 78956
- Area code: 979
- FIPS code: 48-66188
- GNIS feature ID: 2411839
- Website: schulenburgtx.org

Schulenburg is a city in Fayette County, Texas, United States. Its population was 2,633 at the 2020 census. Known for its German culture, Schulenburg is home of the Texas Polka Music Museum. It is in a rural, agricultural area settled by German and Czech emigrants in the 1800s.

== History ==
In 1831, the Mexican government granted 4,428 acres (1,792 ha) of land to Kesiah Crier. Crier's family and the James Lyons family were the first European-American settlers in the area. The town of Schulenburg developed from two nearby communities: Lyons, founded in 1842, and High Hill, settled in 1842 and later named in 1858.

In 1873, the Galveston, Harris and San Antonio Railroad bought land in the area. They built a depot on the portion formerly owned by Louis Schulenburg, and named it after him. The first train arrived on New Year's Eve of 1873, and the town was formally incorporated on May 24, 1875.

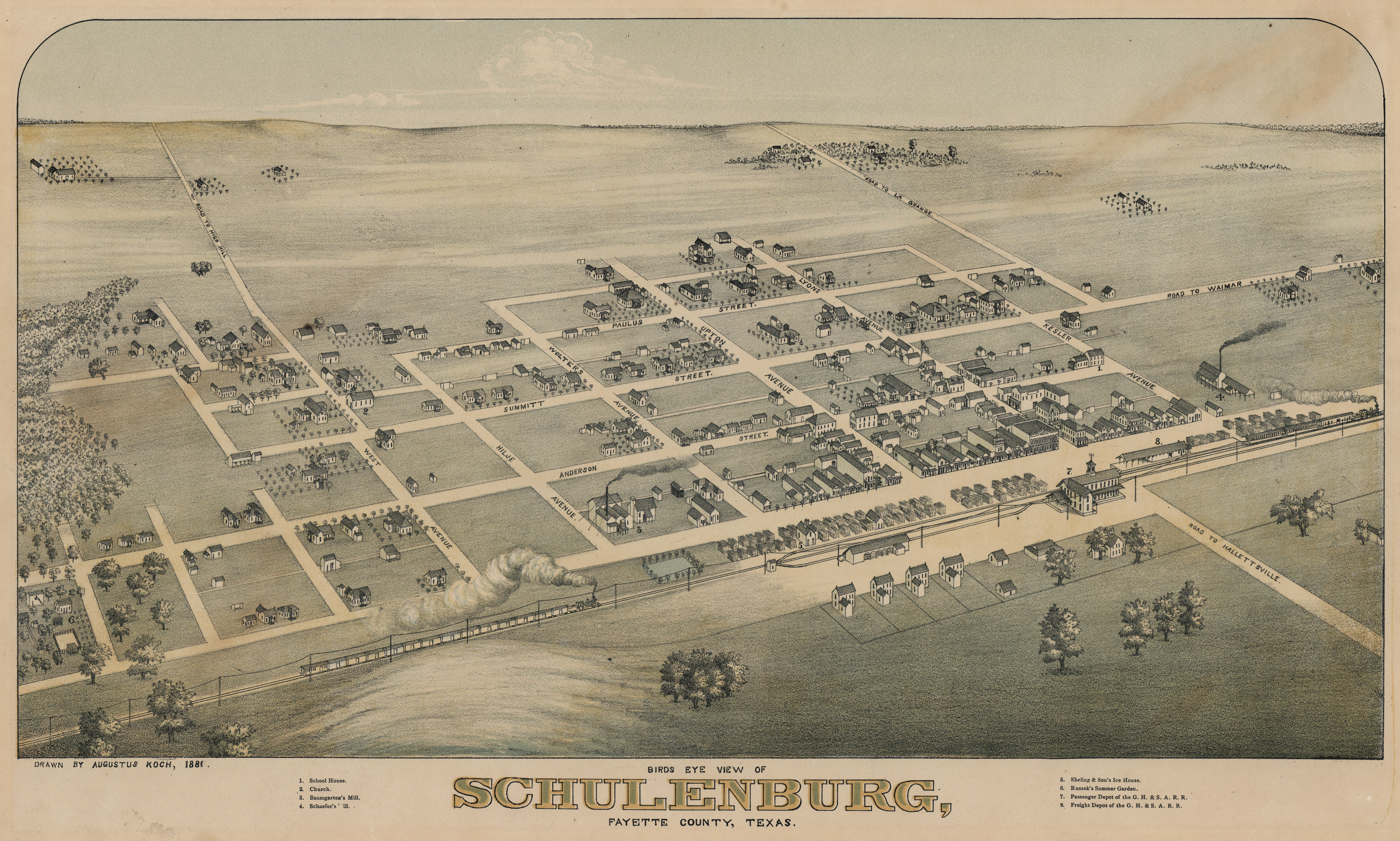
City in 1881

Many of the early settlers to Schulenburg and the surrounding area were immigrants of German, Austrian, and Czech descent, who came after the revolutions of 1848 in Europe. The area still shows evidence of their cultures. For instance, local bakeries are noted for their kolaches, a Czech pastry.

Jewish immigrants also made Schulenburg their home, and many of them became merchants. Initially from Germany in the mid-19th century, they were later joined by immigrants from Eastern Europe.

== Geography ==
Schulenburg is located in southern Fayette County on high ground 2 miles (3 km) east of the Navidad River. It is approximately 95 miles west of Houston, Texas and 100 miles east of San Antonio.

According to the United States Census Bureau, Schulenburg has a total area of 2.5 square miles (6.5 km^{2}), all land.

== Demographics ==
=== 2020 census ===
As of the 2020 census, Schulenburg had a population of 2,633 people residing in 1,092 households and 600 families. The median age was 46.7 years, with 22.7% of residents under the age of 18 and 26.0% who were 65 years of age or older; for every 100 females there were 84.4 males, and for every 100 females age 18 and over there were 80.8 males age 18 and over.

There were 1,092 households in Schulenburg, of which 28.7% had children under the age of 18 living in them. Of all households, 38.5% were married-couple households, 18.4% were households with a male householder and no spouse or partner present, and 37.5% were households with a female householder and no spouse or partner present. About 38.1% of all households were made up of individuals and 21.5% had someone living alone who was 65 years of age or older.

There were 1,297 housing units, of which 15.8% were vacant. The homeowner vacancy rate was 3.6% and the rental vacancy rate was 7.6%.

0.0% of residents lived in urban areas, while 100.0% lived in rural areas.

Racial composition as of the 2020 census
Race	Number	Percent
White	1,545	58.7%
Black or African American	399	15.2%
American Indian and Alaska Native	33	1.3%
Asian	16	0.6%
Native Hawaiian and Other Pacific Islander	0	0.0%
Some other race	284	10.8%
Two or more races	356	13.5%
Hispanic or Latino (of any race)	776	29.5%

=== 2000 census ===
As of the 2000 census, 2,699 people, 1,052 households, and 655 families lived in the city. The population density was 427.1/km^{2} (1,106/mi^{2}). The 1,226 housing units had an average density of 194.0 units/km^{2} (502 units/mi^{2}). The racial makeup of the city was 76.29% White, 15.45% African American, 0.30% Native American, 0.33% Asian, 6.08% from other races, and 1.56% from two or more races. Hispanics or Latinos of any race were 13.56% of the population.

Of the 1,052 households, 26.8% had children under 18 living with them, 46.9% were married couples living together, 11.6% had a female householder with no husband present, and 37.7% were not families. About 34.3% of all households were made up of individuals, and 20.7% had someone living alone who was 65 or older. The average household size was 2.32, and the average family size was 2.96.

In the city, the age distribution was 21.7% under 18, 6.6% from 18 to 24, 23.0% from 25 to 44, 21.1% from 45 to 64, and 27.6% who were 65 or older. The median age was 44 years. For every 100 females, there were 82.0 males. For every 100 females 18 and over, there were 76.0 males.

The median income for a household in the city was $27,619, and for a family was $36,326. Males had a median income of $26,111 versus $20,549 for females. The per capita income for the city was $15,784. About 6.9% of families and 12.5% of the population were below the poverty line, including 13.6% of those under age 18 and 13.5% of those age 65 or over.

Historical population
Census	Pop.	Note	%±
1880	719		—
1890	816		13.5%
1900	1,149		40.8%
1910	1,091		−5.0%
1920	1,246		14.2%
1930	1,604		28.7%
1940	1,970		22.8%
1950	2,005		1.8%
1960	2,207		10.1%
1970	2,294		3.9%
1980	2,469		7.6%
1990	2,455		−0.6%
2000	2,699		9.9%
2010	2,852		5.7%
2020	2,633		−7.7%
U.S. Decennial Census

== Education ==
The city is served by the Schulenburg Independent School District and is home to the Schulenburg Shorthorns. St. Rose of Lima Catholic School (prekindergarten through grade 8) operates under the guidance of the Diocese of Victoria. Other educational institutions include a campus of Blinn College, a public junior college.

== Media ==
Schulenburg is served by one local newspaper, The Schulenburg Sticker, which was founded by German immigrant Ernst Goeth and has been in continuous publication since 1894.

== Infrastructure ==
Schulenburg is located at the general convergence of three major US highways: Interstate 10, U.S. Route 77 and U.S. Route 90. The two US routes form the central intersection of the street, and I-10 flows just north of the city center.

== Notable people ==
- Willis Adams, former wide receiver for the Cleveland Browns of the National Football League
- Hugo Hollas, former NFL player for the New Orleans Saints and San Francisco 49ers
- E. J. Holub, former NFL player for the Kansas City Chiefs.
- Lora Lee Michel (born 1940), American child actor
- Joe Mikulik, minor league baseball manager and player
